= Kaho Naa... Pyaar Hai (soundtrack) =

Soundtrack album by Rajesh Roshan
- Released: 1 December 1999
- Recorded: 1999
- Genres: Feature film soundtrack; Bollywood music
- Length: 50:35
- Language: Hindi
- Label: Saregama
- Producer: Rajesh Roshan

Rajesh Roshan chronology
Daag: The Fire (1999)	Kaho Naa... Pyaar Hai (1999)	Mela (2000)

Kaho Naa... Pyaar Hai is the soundtrack album to the 2000 film of the same name directed by Rakesh Roshan, starring his son Hrithik Roshan in his acting debut, alongside Ameesha Patel. The soundtrack featured nine songs composed by his brother Rajesh Roshan with lyrics written by Ibrahim Ashk, Saawan Kumar Tak and Vijay Akela. The album was released under the Saregama label on 1 December 1999. The soundtrack was commercially successful and received numerous accolades, including Rajesh's win for Best Music Director in various ceremonies.

== Background ==
The soundtrack to Kaho Naa... Pyaar Hai consisted of fast-paced, conventional numbers which were tuned for popular appeal. Rajesh teamed with journalist-poet Ibrahim Ashk and Vijay Akela, in the maiden film stint. Lucky Ali, who assisted Rajesh in his previous compositions, sang two songs for the film, while also assisting him in the chorus and instrumentation. Roshan adapted the tune of the "Voices", composed by Greek musician Vangelis for the eponymous album, for the tune of "Chand Sitare" and "Dil Ne Dil Ko Pukara". The latter has the tune playing throughout the entire song. There is also an additional song, “Janeman Janeman” sung by Asha Bhosle in the extended version of the film.

== Reception, sales and legacy ==
Sabiha Kalolwala in her review for The Indian Express wrote "After a long time, here is an album which is a pleasure to listen to, through and through." Kanchana Suggu of Rediff.com called the music as "good" and "catchy".

The soundtrack sold around 7 to 10 million units, (Note: Anupama Chopra reported that around 7 million units being sold upon its release in 2000, while a report from The Times of India stated that close to 10 million units of the music were sold during that time.) becoming one of the decade's best-selling Bollywood soundtracks of all time. Rajesh, in an interview with Subhash K. Jha recalled that he was initially skeptical on composing Koi... Mil Gaya (2003), the subsequent film with Rakesh, and starred Hrithik, due to the success of the film, but admitted that Rakesh assisted him on scoring the tunes and made it less conventional.

== Track listing ==
No.	Title	Lyrics	Performer(s)	Length
1.	"Kaho Naa Pyaar Hai"	Ibrahim Ashk	Udit Narayan, Alka Yagnik	7:03
2.	"Na Tum Jano Na Hum"	Ibrahim Ashk	Lucky Ali	6:18
3.	"Pyaar Ki Kashti Mein"	Sawan Kumar Tak	Udit Narayan, Alka Yagnik	5:54
4.	"Janeman Janeman"	Sawan Kumar Tak	Asha Bhosle	5:11
5.	"Chand Sitaare"	Sawan Kumar Tak	Kumar Sanu, Kavita Krishnamurthy	6:33
6.	"Dil Ne Dil Ko Pukara"	Ibrahim Ashk	Babul Supriyo	7:56
7.	"Kaho Naa Pyaar Hai" (Sad Version)	Ibrahim Ashk	Udit Narayan	1:06
8.	"Ek Pal Ka Jeena"	Vijay Akela	Lucky Ali	6:36
9.	"Believe in Love" (Theme Music)	—	Instrumental	3:58
Total length:				50:35

== Accolades ==
Award (Note: Awards, festivals and organizations are in alphabetical order.)	Date of ceremony (Note: Date is linked to the article about the awards held that year, wherever possible.)	Category	Recipient(s)	Result	Ref.
Bollywood Movie Awards	28 April 2001	Best Music Director	Rajesh Roshan	Won	
Bollywood Movie Awards	28 April 2001	Best Playback Singer – Male	Lucky Ali for "Ek Pal Ka Jeena"	Won	
Bollywood Movie Awards	28 April 2001	Best Playback Singer – Female	Alka Yagnik for "Kaho Naa Pyaar Hai"	Won	
Filmfare Awards	17 February 2001	Best Music Director	Rajesh Roshan	Won	
Filmfare Awards	17 February 2001	Best Lyricist	Ibrahim Ashk for "Na Tum Jano Na Hum"	Nominated	
Filmfare Awards	17 February 2001	Best Male Playback Singer	Lucky Ali for "Ek Pal Ka Jeena"	Nominated	
Filmfare Awards	17 February 2001	Best Male Playback Singer	Lucky Ali for "Na Tum Jano Na Hum"	Won	
Filmfare Awards	17 February 2001	Best Female Playback Singer	Alka Yagnik for "Kaho Naa Pyaar Hai"	Nominated	
International Indian Film Academy Awards	16 June 2001	Best Music Director	Rajesh Roshan	Won	
International Indian Film Academy Awards	16 June 2001	Best Lyricist	Ibrahim Ashk for "Na Tum Jano Na Hum"	Nominated	
International Indian Film Academy Awards	16 June 2001	Best Male Playback Singer	Lucky Ali for "Ek Pal Ka Jeena"	Won	
International Indian Film Academy Awards	16 June 2001	Best Male Playback Singer	Udit Narayan for "Kaho Naa Pyaar Hai"	Nominated	
International Indian Film Academy Awards	16 June 2001	Best Female Playback Singer	Alka Yagnik for "Kaho Naa Pyaar Hai"	Won	
International Indian Film Academy Awards	16 June 2001	Best Song Recording	Satish Gupta	Won	
Punjabi Kala Sangam Awards	12 November 2000	Best Music Director	Rajesh Roshan	Won	
Punjabi Kala Sangam Awards	12 November 2000	Best Lyricist	Saawan Kumar Tak	Won	
Punjabi Kala Sangam Awards	12 November 2000	Best Male Playback Singer	Kumar Sanu for "Chand Sitaare"	Won	
Screen Awards	20 January 2001	Best Music Director	Rajesh Roshan	Won	
Screen Awards	20 January 2001	Best Background Music	Rajesh Roshan	Nominated	
Screen Awards	20 January 2001	Best Lyricist	Ibrahim Ashk for "Na Tum Jano Na Hum"	Nominated	
Screen Awards	20 January 2001	Best Male Playback Singer	Lucky Ali for "Ek Pal Ka Jeena"	Won	
Screen Awards	20 January 2001	Best Female Playback Singer	Alka Yagnik for "Kaho Naa Pyaar Hai"	Nominated	
Zee Cine Awards	3 March 2001	Best Music Director	Rajesh Roshan	Won	
Zee Cine Awards	3 March 2001	Best Playback Singer – Male	Lucky Ali for "Na Tum Jano Na Hum"	Won	
Zee Cine Awards	3 March 2001	Best Playback Singer – Female	Alka Yagnik for "Kaho Naa Pyaar Hai"	Won	
