= Panchi Nadiya Pawan Ke =

2000 song performed by Anu Malik

Song by Anu Malik (composers) Sonu Nigam, Alka Yagnik (singers)

from the album Refugee
- Genre: Bollywood
- Length: 9:50
- Label: Saregama
- Songwriter: Javed Akhtar
- Producer: J. P. Dutta

"Panchi Nadiya Pawan Ke" is a 2000 Hindi song from the film Refugee. The song is composed by Anu Malik with lyrics by Javed Akhtar. It was sung by Sonu Nigam and Alka Yagnik and picturised on Abhishek Bachchan and Kareena Kapoor.

== Awards and recognitions ==
Sonu Nigam and Alka Yagnik both were nominated for Filmfare Award for Best Male and Best Female Playback Singer respectively, eventually Sonu losing it to Lucky Ali for "Na Tum Jano Na Hum" (Kaho Naa... Pyaar Hai). But Alka Yagnik won the award this year for "Dil Ne Yeh Kaha Hain Dil Se" (Dhadkan). However, Anu Malik won both the National Film Award for Best Music Direction and the Filmfare Special Jury Award for the entire soundtrack album. Javed Akhtar won both the National Film Award for Best Lyrics and the Filmfare Award for Best Lyricist.

== Accolades ==
Award (Note: Awards, festivals and organizations are in alphabetical order.)	Date of ceremony (Note: Date is linked to the article about the awards held that year, wherever possible.)	Category	Recipient(s)	Result	Ref.
Bollywood Movie Awards	28 April 2001	Best Lyricist	Javed Akhtar	Won	
Bollywood Movie Awards	28 April 2001	Best Playback Singer Male	Sonu Nigam	Nominated	
Filmfare Awards	17 February 2001	Best Lyricist	Javed Akhtar	Won	
Filmfare Awards	17 February 2001	Best Male Playback Singer	Sonu Nigam	Nominated	
Filmfare Awards	17 February 2001	Best Female Playback Singer	Alka Yagnik	Nominated	
Filmfare Awards	17 February 2001	Special Award	Anu Malik	Won	
International Indian Film Academy Awards	16 June 2001	Best Lyricist	Javed Akhtar	Nominated	
International Indian Film Academy Awards	16 June 2001	Best Male Playback Singer	Sonu Nigam	Nominated	
National Film Awards	12 December 2001	Best Music Direction	Anu Malik	Won	
National Film Awards	12 December 2001	Best Lyrics	Javed Akhtar	Won	
Screen Awards	20 January 2001	Best Lyricist	Javed Akhtar	Won	
Screen Awards	20 January 2001	Best Male Playback Singer	Sonu Nigam	Nominated	
Screen Awards	20 January 2001	Best Female Playback Singer	Alka Yagnik	Won	
Zee Cine Awards	3 March 2001	Best Lyricist	Javed Akhtar	Won	
