= Sanjay Verma =

Indian film editor (died 2023)

Sanjay Verma (died 25 August 2023), also known as V. Sanjay Verma, was an Indian film editor and sound designer.

== Awards ==
- IIFA Award for Best Editing in 2nd IIFA Awards for Kaho Naa... Pyaar Hai
- Screen Award for Best Editing for Kaho Naa... Pyaar Hai
- Filmfare Award for Best Editing in 34th Filmfare Awards for Khoon Bhari Maang
- Filmfare Award for Best Editing in 41st Filmfare Awards for Karan Arjun
- Filmfare Award for Best Editing in 46th Filmfare Awards for Kaho Naa... Pyaar Hai
