= Mission Kashmir =

- Directed by: Vidhu Vinod Chopra
- Written by: Vikram Chandra; Vidhu Vinod Chopra; Suketu Mehta
- Produced by: Vidhu Vinod Chopra
- Starring: Sanjay Dutt; Hrithik Roshan; Preity Zinta; Sonali Kulkarni; Jackie Shroff
- Cinematography: Binod Pradhan
- Edited by: Rajkumar Hirani
- Music by: Shankar-Ehsaan-Loy
- Production company: Vinod Chopra Productions
- Release date: 27 October 2000
- Running time: 161 minutes
- Country: India
- Language: Hindi
- Budget: ₹200 million
- Box office: ₹433 million

Mission Kashmir is a 2000 Indian Hindi-language action thriller film directed and produced by Vidhu Vinod Chopra. The film stars Sanjay Dutt, Hrithik Roshan, Jackie Shroff, Preity Zinta, and Sonali Kulkarni. Set against the backdrop of conflict in Kashmir, the film explores themes of terrorism, revenge, and the psychological trauma of children affected by war.

The narrative follows Altaaf Khan, a young boy whose family is accidentally killed during a police operation led by Inayat Khan, the very officer who later adopts him. Upon learning the truth, Altaaf escapes and is radicalized into terrorism, returning years later with a mission that brings him into direct conflict with his past. The film examines the complex emotional consequences of violence and the blurred lines between justice and vengeance.

Mission Kashmir was released theatrically on 27 October 2000 during the Diwali festival and was screened at the Stockholm International Film Festival. It received an R rating in the United States due to strong depictions of violence. The film opened alongside Aditya Chopra’s Mohabbatein, which featured Amitabh Bachchan, Shah Rukh Khan, and Aishwarya Rai. Despite the box office clash, Mission Kashmir emerged as a commercial success, earning approximately ₹433 million (US$5.1 million) worldwide and ranking as the third highest-grossing Hindi film of the year.

At the 46th Filmfare Awards, the film received six nominations, including Best Film, Best Director (Chopra), Best Actor (Dutt), Best Supporting Actress (Kulkarni), and won Best Action (Allan Amin).

== Plot ==
Inayat Khan, the Senior Superintendent of Police in Srinagar, Kashmir, loses his young son, Irfaan, after local doctors refuse treatment due to a fatwa issued by the wanted militant Malik Ul Khan, which forbids medical assistance to an honest police officer, and their families. Seeking revenge, Inayat leads a successful operation to eliminate Malik and his associates. However, during the raid, a civilian couple is killed this enrages, in the crossfire, leaving their young son, Altaaf, as the sole survivor.

At the urging of his wife, Neelima, Inayat adopts Altaaf but conceals the circumstances of his parents’ death. Years later, Altaaf uncovers the truth, attempts to kill Inayat, and flees. He is eventually found and radicalized by Hilal Kohistani, the leader of a militant group, who raises him to become a terrorist.

A decade later, Altaaf returns to Srinagar as part of “Mission Kashmir,” a terrorist operation that ostensibly aims to assassinate the Indian Prime Minister. As part of the plan, Altaaf reconnects with his childhood friend and television personality, Sufiya Parvez. Though he falls in love with her, he uses the relationship to attempt an attack on the city’s TV tower. His actions make him a wanted criminal, and when Sufiya learns of his true identity, she breaks off their relationship.

Altaaf later plants a bomb intended for Inayat, but Neelima is killed in the explosion. Devastated by her death, both Altaaf and Inayat are pushed further into conflict. Inayat discovers that the true objective of "Mission Kashmir" is not political assassination but a plan to bomb both Hindu and Muslim religious sites, inciting communal violence and destabilizing the region. The prime minister’s assassination was merely a diversion. Hilal had kept the full extent of the plan hidden from Altaaf, fearing his rejection, and secretly ordered Altaaf’s execution should he refuse to comply.

Inayat captures Hilal and proposes a deal—allowing the mission to proceed if Hilal agrees to kill Altaaf. During the confrontation, Altaaf overpowers Inayat, who then reveals the real intent of the mission. When ordered to execute Inayat, Altaaf hesitates and ultimately refuses, moved by memories of Neelima’s kindness. He kills Hilal instead and dismantles the missile launchers, foiling the operation and killing enraged the remaining militants. Wounded in the process, Altaaf is rescued by Inayat.

The terrorist plot is later exposed by the media. Altaaf awakens from a dream and reconciles with Sufiya and Inayat, finally accepting the latter as his father once again.

== Cast ==
- Sanjay Dutt as IG Inayat Khan
- Hrithik Roshan as Altaaf Khan
- Preity Zinta as Sufiya Parvez
- Sonali Kulkarni as Neelima Khan
- Jackie Shroff as Hilal Kohistani
- Puru Raaj Kumar as Malikul Khan
- Abhay Chopra as Avinash Mattoo
- Vineet Sharma as Gurdeep Singh
- Rajendra Gupta as Chief Secretary
- Ashok Banthia as Sharafat
- Mohsin Memon as Young Altaaf
- Heenaa Biswas as Young Sufia
- Yogin Soni as Irfaan Khan
- Rohit Dua as Guru
- Sandeep Mehta as Dr. Akhtar
- Suchita Trivedi as Dr. Akhtar's wife
- Ram Awana as Zuber
- Papa Pencho as Himself
- Manoj Mishra as Koisha

== Production ==
Principal photography for Mission Kashmir began in late 1999, with several sequences filmed on location in Srinagar, Jammu and Kashmir. At the time, lead actor Hrithik Roshan had not yet made his acting debut, as his first film Kaho Naa... Pyaar Hai (2000) had not been released. During the initial days of filming, Roshan appeared on set dressed as a Kashmiri militant, in line with his character in the film. Due to his appearance and the heightened security in the region, he was reportedly mistaken for a local insurgent by security personnel and denied access to the set.

Following the release of Kaho Naa... Pyaar Hai on 14 January 2000, Roshan gained nationwide recognition, which led to fewer such incidents for the remainder of the shoot.

== Release ==
Mission Kashmir was released theatrically on 27 October 2000 during the Diwali festival, simultaneously with Aditya Chopra’s Mohabbatein.

== Reception ==
=== Box office ===
Mission Kashmir emerged as a commercial success at the box office. Domestically, it earned approximately ₹365 million, with an additional ₹68 million from overseas markets, bringing its total worldwide gross to around ₹433 million (US$5.1 million). It ranked as the third highest-grossing Hindi film of the year, following Mohabbatein and Kaho Naa... Pyaar Hai.

=== Critical reception ===
Mission Kashmir received generally positive reviews from critics, who praised its performances, technical quality, and intent to address socio-political issues, though some noted shortcomings in its depth and execution.

Saisuresh Sivaswamy of Rediff.com called it "a story from the director's heart, not his head," and commended the emotional sincerity evident "in frame after frame." N. K. Deoshi of ApunKaChoice rated the film 4 out of 5 stars, writing, "Beneath all the drama that goes on in the movie there lurks the aspiration to get across to people the message of what people of Kashmir are actually going through."

Savitha Padmanabhan of The Hindu described the film as "a cut above the rest of the commercial Hindi films that have been made on terrorism" and praised its performances and production values. A review from Screen lauded the sincerity of Chopra’s approach and the cast’s performances but noted that "there is very little of Kashmiriyat in the story, which is more of a personal conflict between the victim of a police shoot-out and a police officer."

Suman Tarafdar of Filmfare, however, criticized the film for lacking a serious examination of the political conflict at its core. Vinayak Chakravorty of Hindustan Times awarded it 3.5 stars and described it as "a good show," with particular praise for Sanjay Dutt’s performance, which he called "perfect." Jitendra Kothari of India Today described Mission Kashmir as "a gripping film on a trenchantly topical issue" and commended its emotional complexity, stating it "avoids apportioning blame by intermingling strains of loss and guilt."

== Accolades ==
Award	Date of the ceremony	Category	Recipients	Result	Ref.
Screen Awards	20 January 2001	Best Film	Mission Kashmir	Nominated	
Screen Awards	20 January 2001	Best Director	Vidhu Vinod Chopra	Nominated	
Screen Awards	20 January 2001	Best Supporting Actor	Sanjay Dutt	Won	
Screen Awards	20 January 2001	Best Supporting Actress	Sonali Kulkarni	Nominated	
Screen Awards	20 January 2001	Best Villain	Jackie Shroff	Nominated	
Screen Awards	20 January 2001	Best Female Playback Singer	Sunidhi Chauhan for "Bumbro"	Nominated	
Screen Awards	20 January 2001	Best Dialogue	Atul Tiwari	Nominated	
Screen Awards	20 January 2001	Best Background Music	Shankar–Ehsaan–Loy	Nominated	
Screen Awards	20 January 2001	Best Choreography	Saroj Khan (for "Bumbro")	Nominated	
Screen Awards	20 January 2001	Best Cinematography	Binod Pradhan	Won	
Screen Awards	20 January 2001	Best Art Direction	Nitin Chandrakant Desai	Nominated	
Screen Awards	20 January 2001	Best Action	Allan Amin	Won	
Screen Awards	20 January 2001	Best Sound Recording	Jitendra Chaudhary, Mike Dowson, Shantanu Hudlikar, and Manoj Sikka	Won	
Screen Awards	20 January 2001	Best Special Effects	Mission Kashmir	Nominated	
Filmfare Awards	17 February 2001	Best Film	Mission Kashmir	Nominated	
Filmfare Awards	17 February 2001	Best Director	Vidhu Vinod Chopra	Nominated	
Filmfare Awards	17 February 2001	Best Actor	Sanjay Dutt	Nominated	
Filmfare Awards	17 February 2001	Best Supporting Actress	Sonali Kulkarni	Nominated	
Filmfare Awards	17 February 2001	Best Performance in a Negative Role	Jackie Shroff	Nominated	
Filmfare Awards	17 February 2001	Best Cinematography	Binod Pradhan	Won	
Filmfare Awards	17 February 2001	Best Action	Allan Amin	Won	
Zee Cine Awards	3 March 2001	Best Film	Mission Kashmir	Nominated	
Zee Cine Awards	3 March 2001	Best Director	Vidhu Vinod Chopra	Nominated	
Zee Cine Awards	3 March 2001	Best Actor	Sanjay Dutt	Nominated	
Zee Cine Awards	3 March 2001	Best Supporting Actress	Sonali Kulkarni	Nominated	
Zee Cine Awards	3 March 2001	Best Villain	Jackie Shroff	Nominated	
Zee Cine Awards	3 March 2001	Premiere Choice Award – Male	Sanjay Dutt	Won	
Bollywood Movie Awards	28 April 2001	Best Film	Mission Kashmir	Nominated	
Bollywood Movie Awards	28 April 2001	Best Director	Vidhu Vinod Chopra	Nominated	
Bollywood Movie Awards	28 April 2001	Best Actor	Sanjay Dutt	Nominated	
Bollywood Movie Awards	28 April 2001	Best Actor (Critics)	Sanjay Dutt	Nominated	
Bollywood Movie Awards	28 April 2001	Best Villain	Jackie Shroff	Nominated	
Bollywood Movie Awards	28 April 2001	Best Choreography	Saroj Khan (for "Bumbro")	Nominated	
Bollywood Movie Awards	28 April 2001	Best Cinematography	Binod Pradhan	Nominated	
Bollywood Movie Awards	28 April 2001	Best Costume Design	Neeta Lulla	Won	
Sansui Viewers' Choice Movie Awards	3 June 2001	Best Actor	Hrithik Roshan	Nominated	
Sansui Viewers' Choice Movie Awards	3 June 2001	Best Supporting Actor	Sanjay Dutt	Nominated	
Sansui Viewers' Choice Movie Awards	3 June 2001	Best Performance in a Negative Role	Jackie Shroff	Nominated	
International Indian Film Academy Awards	16 June 2001	Best Film	Mission Kashmir	Nominated	
International Indian Film Academy Awards	16 June 2001	Best Director	Vidhu Vinod Chopra	Nominated	
International Indian Film Academy Awards	16 June 2001	Best Actor	Sanjay Dutt	Nominated	
International Indian Film Academy Awards	16 June 2001	Best Supporting Actress	Sonali Kulkarni	Nominated	
International Indian Film Academy Awards	16 June 2001	Best Villain	Jackie Shroff	Nominated	
International Indian Film Academy Awards	16 June 2001	Best Music Director	Shankar–Ehsaan–Loy	Nominated	
International Indian Film Academy Awards	16 June 2001	Best Cinematography	Binod Pradhan	Won	

== Soundtrack ==
Mission Kashmir

Studio album by Shankar–Ehsaan–Loy
- Released: 27 October 2000
- Genre: Feature film soundtrack
- Label: Tips
- Producer: Shankar–Ehsaan–Loy

Shankar–Ehsaan–Loy chronology
Shool (1999)	Mission Kashmir (2000)	Dil Chahta Hai (2001)

The soundtrack of Mission Kashmir features seven songs and marks an early collaboration of the composer trio Shankar–Ehsaan–Loy, who worked on the album individually rather than jointly. Ehsaan Noorani composed three tracks, while Shankar Mahadevan and Loy Mendonsa contributed two compositions each. The lyrics were penned by various lyricists, including Sameer.

The album received critical appreciation for blending traditional Kashmiri folk influences with contemporary arrangements. Notably, the track "Bumbro," based on a Kashmiri folk melody, became particularly popular and was later recreated under the same title for the film Notebook (2019).

According to Box Office India, the soundtrack sold approximately 1.5 million units, making it the third highest-selling Bollywood soundtrack of 2000.

Song	Singer(s)	Composer	Lyricist(s)
"Bumbro"	Shankar Mahadevan, Jaspinder Narula, Sunidhi Chauhan	Ehsaan Noorani	Rahat Indori
"Chupke Se Sun"	Udit Narayan, Alka Yagnik	Shankar Mahadevan	Sameer Anjaan
"Rind Posh Maal"	Shankar Mahadevan	Loy Mendonsa	Sameer Anjaan
"Socho Ke Jheelon Ka"	Udit Narayan, Alka Yagnik & Shankar Mahadevan	Ehsaan Noorani	Sameer Anjaan
"Maaf Karo"	Shankar Mahdevan, Sadhana Sargam	Ehsaan Noorani	Rahat Indori
"So Ja Chanda"	Mahalakshmi Iyer	Loy Mendonsa	Rahat Indori
"Dhuan Dhuan"	Shankar Mahadevan	Shankar Mahadevan	Rahat Indori
