= Fiza =

2000 film directed by Khalid Mohammed

- Theatrical release poster
- Directed by: Khalid Mohammed
- Written by: Khalid Mohammed; Javed Siddiqui (dialogue)
- Produced by: Pradeep Guha
- Starring: Karishma Kapoor; Hrithik Roshan; Jaya Bachchan
- Narrated by: Karisma Kapoor
- Cinematography: Santosh Sivan
- Edited by: A. Sreekar Prasad
- Music by: Songs: Anu Malik; Guest Composers: A. R. Rahman; Ranjit Barot; Score: Ranjit Barot
- Production companies: The Culture Company; UTV Motion Pictures
- Distributed by: UTV Motion Pictures
- Release date: 8 September 2000
- Running time: 171 minutes
- Country: India
- Language: Hindi
- Budget: ₹55 million
- Box office: ₹322 million

Fiza, elaborately known as Fiza: In Search Of Her Brother, is a 2000 Indian Hindi-language crime thriller film written and directed by Khalid Mohammed. It stars Karishma Kapoor as the eponymous lead, with Hrithik Roshan as her terrorist brother and Jaya Bachchan as their mother. The film was produced by Pradeep Guha on a budget of ₹55 million and had a theatrical release worldwide on 8 September 2000.

Upon release, Fiza received positive reviews, with its storyline and soundtrack, as well as cast performances earning praise. A box office success, the film earned ₹322 million (US$7.17 million) worldwide. Fiza received seven nominations at the 46th Filmfare Awards and won Best Actress for Kapoor and Best Supporting Actress for Bachchan.

== Plot ==
Fiza's innocent younger brother, Amaan, disappears during the 1993 Bombay riots while trying to save his life after witnessing his friend Firoz being brutally killed. Fiza and her mother, Nishatbi, desperately cling to the hope that he will one day return. However, by 1999—six years after his disappearance—Fiza, weary of living in uncertainty, decides to search for her brother. She uses every means at her disposal—the law, media, and even political contacts—which brings her into contact with various people and situations. She learns that Amaan had pleaded with a police officer to save him, only to be told to go to Pakistan, which deeply shocked him. He was later attacked but managed to escape. Meanwhile, his lover, Shehnaaz, who had waited for him all those years, is eventually forced to marry Salim due to family pressure. Based on a match between Amaan's eyes and those of a suspected terrorist, Fiza's friend Anirudh Roy suspects that Amaan may have joined a terrorist group near the Rajasthan border.

Fiza eventually finds Amaan at the border and is horrified to discover that he has indeed joined a terrorist group. He recounts how he survived the riots, the horrors he witnessed, and how Murad Khan recruited him after saving his life. Fiza persuades him to return home, and he finally reunites with their mother. Soon after, Amaan learns of Anirudh's romantic feelings for Fiza and his desire to marry her and support the family. Touched by Anirudh’s sincerity, Amaan gives him his blessing and asks him to always stand by Fiza and their mother. Amaan attempts to find work, determined not to be a burden on his family, but is repeatedly rejected due to his past. Frustrated and disillusioned, he begins to consider rejoining Murad’s terrorist network. When two men harass Fiza, Amaan intervenes, leading him to reveal his past involvement with the terrorist group to Fiza, their mother, and the police. Devastated by the loss of her innocent son to terrorism, Nishatbi takes her own life. With Anirudh's help, Fiza continues her efforts to save her brother.

Amaan is assigned a mission to assassinate two powerful politicians who exploit religion for their own gain—ironically, the same politicians who once tried to manipulate Fiza during her search for Amaan. After successfully killing them, Amaan is betrayed by his own group, who attempt to eliminate him. He escapes, and Fiza follows him. Cornered by the police, Amaan pleads with Fiza to kill him, believing that he can never be proud of his life but still longs for a dignified end. In a final act of mercy and love, Fiza grants his request and kills her brother.

== Cast ==
- Karisma Kapoor as Fiza Ikramullah
- Hrithik Roshan as Amaan Ikramullah
- Jaya Bachchan as Nishatvi Ikramullah
- Shabana Raza as Shehnaz Sulaiman
- Manoj Bajpayee as Murad Khan
- Sushmita Sen as Item song Mehboob Mere (special appearance)
- Asha Sachdev as Ulfat Jaan
- Isha Koppikar as Geetanjali Malhotra
- Bikram Saluja as Anirudh Roy
- Shivaji Satam as Kunal Sawant
- Anup Soni as a goon
- Johnny Lever as the Laughing Club Comic (special appearance)
- Savita Prabhune as a policewoman (special appearance)
- Jaya Bhattacharya as a job Interviewer (special appearance)
- Sanjay Narvekar as a police officer (special appearance)

== Production ==
=== Development ===
Initially, Ram Gopal Varma was to direct the film but didn't work out. Mohammed was then "pushed into directing" after encouragement by Santosh Sivan and Karishma Kapoor.

=== Casting ===
Urmila Matondkar was Mohammed’s first choice for the role of Fiza, but the part eventually went to Karisma Kapoor. Hrithik Roshan was cast as Amaan, Fiza’s younger brother. Roshan’s role was initially minor, but following the breakout success of his debut film Kaho Naa... Pyaar Hai, released earlier the same year, Mohammed significantly expanded his role.

== Soundtrack ==
Fiza

Soundtrack album by Anu Malik, A. R. Rahman & Ranjit Barot
- Released: 8 September 2000
- Genre: Feature film soundtrack
- Length: 48:35
- Label: Tips Music Films
- Producer: Anu Malik

Anu Malik chronology
Har Dil Jo Pyar Karega (2000)	Fiza (2000)	Refugee (2000)

A. R. Rahman chronology
Kandukondain Kandukondain (2000)	Fiza (2000)	Rhythm (2000)

Initially, A. R. Rahman was approached to compose the music for the film, but he declined citing date issues. However he agreed to compose one song which became "Piya Haji Ali", while rest of the songs were composed by Anu Malik. He later composed for the director's next, Tehzeeb (2003). For the background score of Fiza, Rahman suggested his associate Ranjit Barot. Barot composed the score. The album was one of the most popular soundtracks of the year. It features popular songs like "Aaja Mahiya", "Aankh Milaoongi", "Tu Fiza Hai" and "Mehboob Mere". "Mehboob Mere" was performed by Sushmita Sen as an Item number. At the 46th Filmfare Awards, Malik received a Best Music Director nomination for the soundtrack of the film. for his work on this album. According to the Indian trade website Box Office India, with around 25,00,000 units sold, this film's soundtrack album was one of the highest-selling of the year.

#	Song	Singer(s)	Composer	Lyricist
1	"Aaja Mahiya"	Udit Narayan, Alka Yagnik	Anu Malik	Gulzar
2	"Mehboob Mere"	Sunidhi Chauhan, Karsan Sargathia	Anu Malik	Tejpal Kaur
3	"Tu Fiza Hai"	Alka Yagnik, Sonu Nigam, Prashant Samadhar	Anu Malik	Gulzar
4	"Gaya Gaya Dil"	Sonu Nigam	Anu Malik	Sameer
5	"Piya Haji Ali"	A. R. Rahman, Kadar Ghulam Mushtafa, Murtaza Ghulam Mushtafa, Srinivas	A. R. Rahman	Shaukat Ali
6	"Na Leke Jao"	Jaspinder Narula	Anu Malik	Gulzar
7	"Mere Watan: Amaan's Fury"	Zubeen Garg	Ranjit Barot	Sameer
8	"Aankh Milaoongi"	Asha Bhosle	Anu Malik	Sameer

== Reception ==
=== Box office ===
Fiza was released theatrically on 8 September 2000 and earned approximately ₹322 million worldwide.

In May 2010, Fiza was one of 14 Hindi films selected by the Film Society of Lincoln Center to be screened as part of a curated section titled Muslim Cultures of Bombay Cinema, which aimed to "celebrate and explore the rich influence of Muslim cultural and social traditions on the cinema of Bombay".

The film was banned from screening in Malaysia.

=== Critical response ===
Vinayak Chakravorty of Hindustan Times rated the film 4 out of 5 stars, stating, "It is about Kapoor proving a point as an actress of some substance. It is about Hrithik Roshan establishing that he doesn't need maximum footage or glitz to impress. It is about the return after a hiatus of the ever-delightful Jaya Bachchan."

Mimmy Jain of The Indian Express described Fiza as "the kind of movie that every critic prays will never come his way," adding that it "offers little scope for criticism." She praised Kapoor's performance as "superbly flawless." Suman Tarafdar of Filmfare lauds the film's effort of dealing with their core themes while Chaya Unnikrishnan of Screen says the movie "does live upto the expectations one had from the critic-turned-director Khalid Mohamed".

Sanjeev Bariana of The Tribune called the film "only a little above average". Dinesh Raheja of India Today praised the film as "watchable for its captivatingly-captured sequences within a close-knit family" but says "the big picture it wants to capture remains underdeveloped."

== Accolades ==
The film received several accolades, including four Bengal Film Journalists' Association Awards, two Filmfare Awards, two IIFA Awards, and two Zee Cine Award.

== See also ==
- List of highest-grossing Bollywood films
