= Rocky Star =

Indian fashion designer

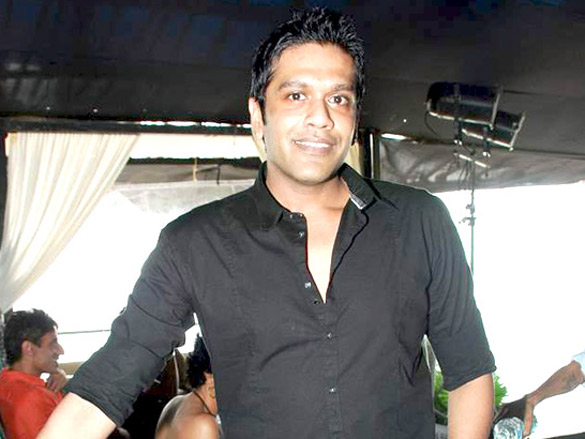
- Born: Bombay, Maharashtra, India
- Other name: Rocky S
- Education: jdinstituteoffashiontechnology.com
- Occupation: Fashion designer
- Website: rockystarworld.com

Rocky Star is an Indian fashion designer.

== Career ==
Rocky Star draws inspiration from the Baroque and Gothic time periods, with influences and traces seen across all his collections. He has also designed for Beyoncé Knowles, Paris Hilton and Pussycat Dolls.

His design sensibility blends India heritage crafts and textures with opulent embroideries, focusing on occasion wear along with bridal, pret and accessories for women and men.

Rocky showcased his Autumn Winter collection, Nomadic Love at London Fashion Week in 2016. Ever since Rocky has showcased 6 seasons at London Fashion Week with the latest showcase being in February 2019.

== Films ==
Rocky landed his first styling project with Akshay Kumar in 1992. Ever since, he has designed for over 350 films including Kaho Naa... Pyaar Hai (2000) and Kabhi Khushi Kabhie Gham (2001) and Goal! (2005). Rocky Star has also designed costumes for a Bollywood film titled Robot 2. He has designed costumes for several films in the past including Gaddar for actress Amisha Patel and Krrish for actor Hrithik Roshan.

== Awards ==
Year	Award	Film	Result	Ref.
2004	Zee Cine Award for Best Costume Design	Koi... Mil Gaya	Nominated	

== Other ==
Rocky has now opened flagship store in Khar West, ROCKY STAR STORE in September, 2022.

Rocky also owns a restaurant in Mumbai, named Rocky Star Cocktail Bar. He has a furniture brand called Rocky Star Home by Bent Chair and a high street wear brand called RS by Rocky Star in partnership with Shoppers Stop.
