= National Film Award for Best Lyrics =

Indian film award

- Awarded for: Best lyrics of a song for the feature film for a year
- Sponsored by: National Film Development Corporation of India
- Formerly called: Lyric Writer of the Best Film Song on National Integration (1968–1972)
- Rewards: Rajat Kamal (Silver Lotus); ₹2,00,000
- First award: 1968; 58 years ago
- Most recent winner: Manoj Muntashir, Maidaan (2024)

Highlights
- Most wins: Vairamuthu (7)

The National Film Award for Best Lyrics is an honour presented annually at the National Film Awards by the National Film Development Corporation of India (NFDC) to a lyricist who has composed the best song for films produced within the Indian film industry. The award was first introduced at the 16th National Film Awards in 1969. It was intermittently awarded until the 22nd National Film Awards (1975). From then on, no award was presented until the 32nd National Film Awards (1985). However, since 1985 every year the award has been presented with the exception of the 34th National Film Awards (1987).

Although the Indian film industry produces films in around 20 languages and dialects, the award honors lyricists who have worked in seven major languages: Hindi (17 awards), Tamil (11 awards), Telugu (5 awards), Kannada and Malayalam (4 awards each), Bengali (3 awards), Punjabi and Haryanvi (1 award each).

Tamil poet Kannadasan was the first recipient of the award. He won the prize for his work in the 1967 Tamil film Kuzhanthaikkaga. The lyricist who won the most Rajat Kamal awards is Vairamuthu (Tamil) with seven wins, followed by Javed Akhtar (Hindi) with five wins. Five lyricists: Gulzar (Hindi),. Swanand Kirkire (Hindi), Prasoon Joshi (Hindi) Na. Muthukumar (Tamil) and Manoj Muntashir (Hindi) have won the award on two occasions.

== List of recipients ==
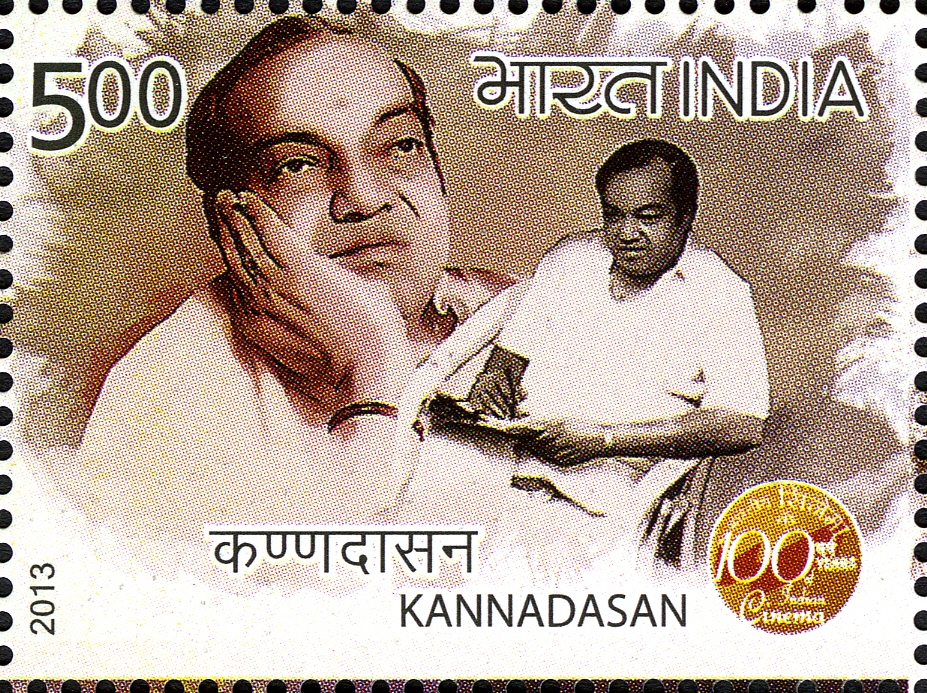
Kannadasan was the first recipient in this category.

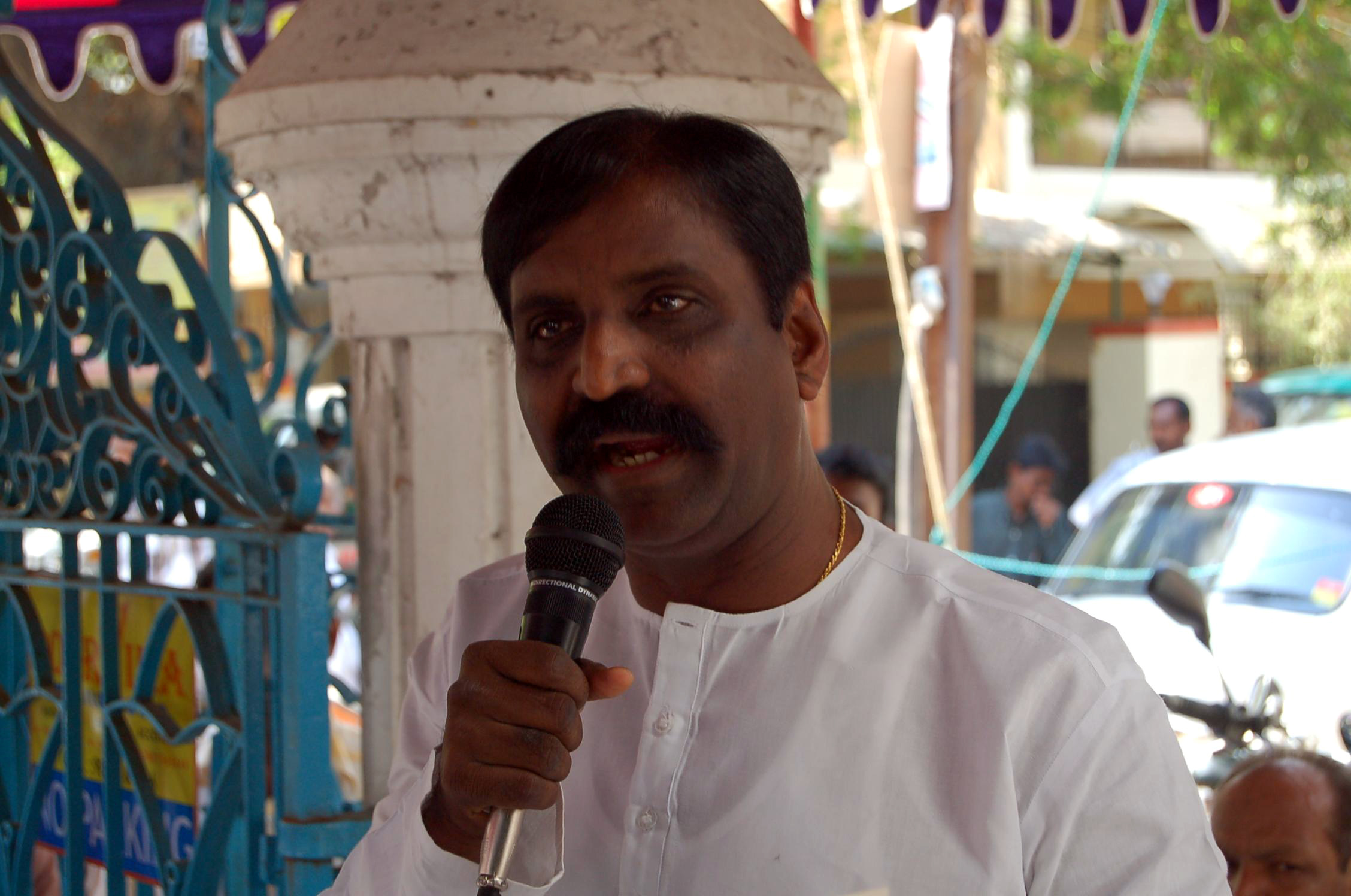
With seven wins, Vairamuthu is the most awarded lyricist in this category.

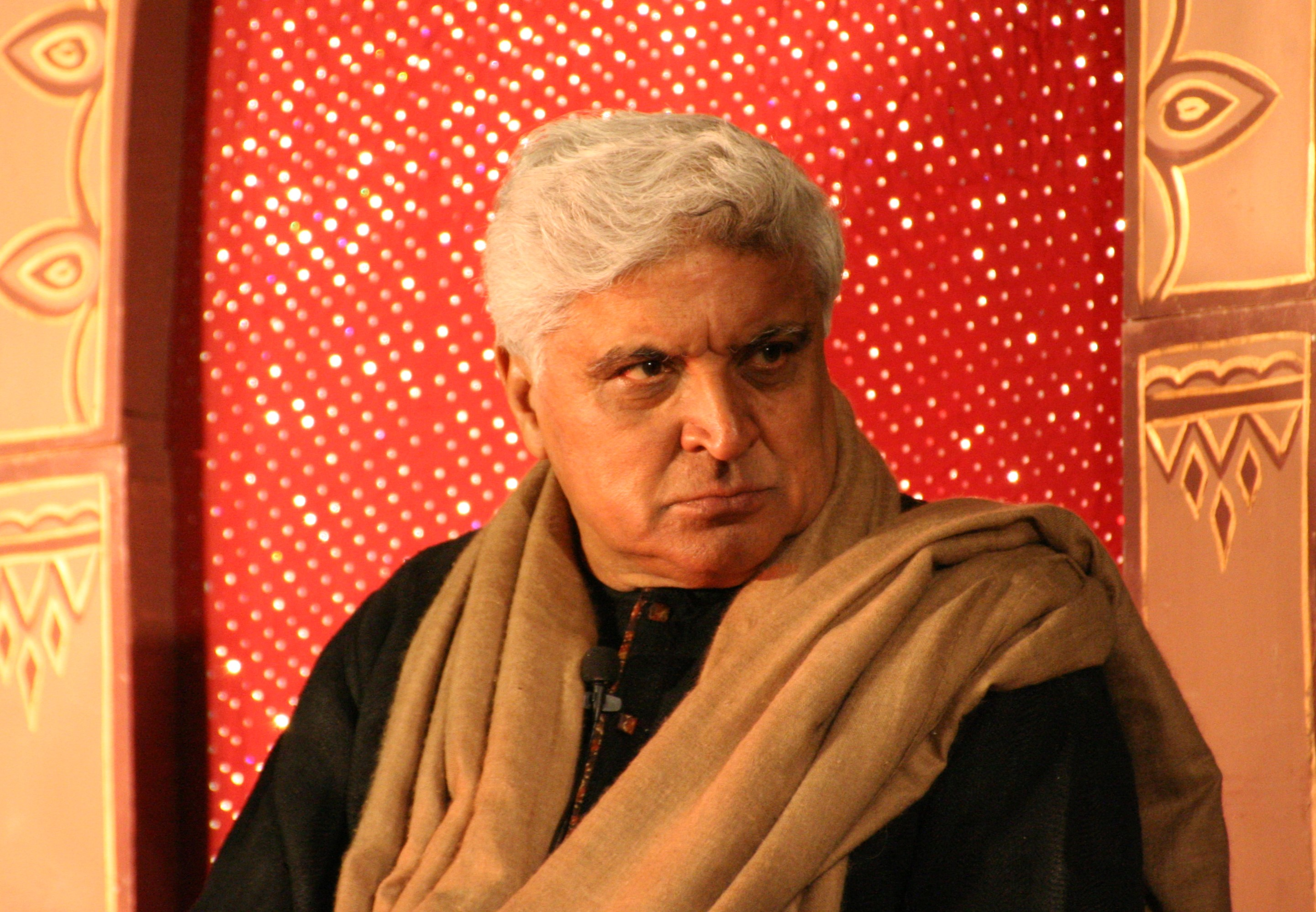
With five wins, Javed Akhtar is the second-most awarded lyricist in this category.

Indicates a joint award for that year

List of award recipients, showing the year (award ceremony), song(s), film(s) and language(s)
Year	Recipient(s)	Song(s)	Film(s)	Language(s)	Refs.
1968 (16th)	Kannadasan	–	Kuzhanthaikkaga	Tamil	
1969 (17th)	Kaifi Azmi	"Aandhi Aaye Ki Toofan"	Saat Hindustani	Hindi	
1970 (18th)	No Award				
1971 (19th)	Prem Dhawan	–	Nanak Dukhiya Sub Sansar	Punjabi	
1972 (20th)	Vayalar Ramavarma	–	Achanum Bappayum	Malayalam	
1973 (21st)	No Award				
1974 (22nd)	Sri Sri	"Telugu Veera Levara"	Alluri Seetharamaraju	Telugu	
1975 (23rd)	No Award				
1976 (24th)	No Award				
1977 (25th)	No Award				
1978 (26th)	No Award				
1979 (27th)	No Award				
1980 (28th)	No Award				
1981 (29th)	No Award				
1982 (30th)	No Award				
1983 (31st)	No Award				
1984 (32nd)	Vasant Dev	–	Saaransh	Hindi	
1985 (33rd)	Vairamuthu	–	Muthal Mariyathai	Tamil	
1986 (34th)	No Award				
1987 (35th)	Gulzar	"Mera Kuchh Saamaan"	Ijaazat	Hindi	
1988 (36th)	O. N. V. Kurup	–	Vaishali	Malayalam	
1989 (37th)	Satarupa Sanyal	–	Chhandaneer	Bengali	
1990 (38th)	Gulzar	–	Lekin...	Hindi	
1991 (39th)	K. S. Narasimhaswamy	–	Mysore Mallige	Kannada	
1992 (40th)	Vairamuthu	"Chinna Chinna Aasai"	Roja	Tamil	
1993 (41st)	Veturi	"Raali Poye Puvva"	Mathru Devo Bhava	Telugu	
1994 (42nd)	Vairamuthu	• "Poralae Ponnuthayi" • "Uyirum Neeye"	• Karuththamma • Pavithra	Tamil	
1995 (43rd)	Amit Khanna	"Kuch Is Tarah"	Bhairavi	Hindi	
1996 (44th)	Javed Akhtar	–	Saaz	Hindi	
1997 (45th)	Javed Akhtar	–	Border	Hindi	
1998 (46th)	Javed Akhtar	"Maati Re Maati Re"	Godmother	Hindi	
1999 (47th)	Vairamuthu	"Mudhal Murai Killipparthaein"	Sangamam	Tamil	
2000 (48th)	Yusufali Kechery	"Gayam Hari Nama Dhayam"	Mazha	Malayalam	
2000 (48th)	Javed Akhtar	"Panchchhi Nadiyaan"	Refugee	Hindi	
2001 (49th)	Javed Akhtar	• "Ghanan Ghanan" • "Radha Kaise Na Jale"	Lagaan	Hindi	
2002 (50th)	Vairamuthu	"Oru Deivam Thantha Poove"	Kannathil Muthamittal	Tamil	
2003 (51st)	Suddala Ashok Teja	"Nenu Saitham"	Tagore	Telugu	
2004 (52nd)	P. Vijay	"Ovvoru Pookalume"	Autograph	Tamil	
2005 (53rd)	Baraguru Ramachandrappa	"Barutheve Naav Barutheve"	Thaayi	Kannada	
2006 (54th)	Swanand Kirkire	"Bande Me Tha Dum"	Lage Raho Munna Bhai	Hindi	
2007 (55th)	Prasoon Joshi	"Maa"	Taare Zameen Par	Hindi	
2008 (56th)	Anindya Chatterjee	"Pherari Mon"	Antaheen	Bengali	
2008 (56th)	Chandril Bhattacharya	"Pherari Mon"	Antaheen	Bengali	
2009 (57th)	Swanand Kirkire	"Behti Hawa Sa Tha Woh"	3 Idiots	Hindi	
2010 (58th)	Vairamuthu	"Kallikkaattil Pirandha Thaayae"	Thenmerku Paruvakaatru	Tamil	
2011 (59th)	Amitabh Bhattacharya	"Agar Zindagi"	I Am	Hindi	
2012 (60th)	Prasoon Joshi	"Bolo Naa"	Chittagong	Hindi	
2013 (61st)	Na. Muthukumar	"Ananda Yaazhai Meettugirai"	Thanga Meenkal	Tamil	
2014 (62nd)	Na. Muthukumar	"Azhagu"	Saivam	Tamil	
2015 (63rd)	Varun Grover	"Moh Moh Ke Dhaage"	Dum Laga Ke Haisha	Hindi	
2016 (64th)	Vairamuthu	"Entha Pakkam"	Dharma Durai	Tamil	
2016 (64th)	Anupam Roy	"Tumi Jaake Bhalobasho"	Praktan	Bengali	
2017 (65th)	J. M. Prahlad	"Muthu Ratnada Pyate"	22 March	Kannada	
2018 (66th)	Manjunatha S. Reddy	"Maayavi Manave"	Nathicharami	Kannada	
2019 (67th)	Prabha Varma	"Aarodum Parayathe Vayya"	Kolaambi	Malayalam	
2020 (68th)	Manoj Muntashir	–	Saina	Hindi	
2021 (69th)	Chandrabose	"Dham Dham Dham"	Konda Polam	Telugu	
2022 (70th)	Naushad Sadar Khan	"Salaami"	Fouja	Haryanvi	
2023 (71st)	Kasarla Shyam	"Ooru Palletooru"	Balagam	Telugu	
2024 (72nd)	Manoj Muntashir	"Jaane Do"	Maidaan	Hindi	
