= 2nd IIFA Awards =

2001 Indian film award ceremony

- Date: 16 June 2001
- Site: Super Bowl Arena, Sun City, South Africa
- Hosted by: Priyanka Chopra and Kabir Bedi

Highlights
- Best Picture: Kaho Naa... Pyaar Hai
- Best Direction: Rakesh Roshan (Kaho Naa... Pyaar Hai)
- Best Actor: Hrithik Roshan (Kaho Naa... Pyaar Hai)
- Best Actress: Karisma Kapoor (Fiza)
- Most awards: Kaho Naa... Pyaar Hai (10)
- Most nominations: Mohabbatein (13)

Television coverage
- Channel: Sony Entertainment Television
- Network: Sony Pictures Networks India

The 2001 IIFA Awards, officially known as the 2nd International Indian Film Academy Awards ceremony, presented by the International Indian Film Academy honoured the best films of 2000 and took place between June 16, 2001. This year, the city of Sun City played host to the Indian Film Industry.

The official ceremony took place on June 16, 2001, at the Sun City, in Super Bowl Arena Sun City . During the ceremony, IIFA Awards were awarded in 27 competitive categories.

Reflective of its guiding philosophy, the venue for IIFA 2001 was the splendorous Sun City in South Africa. The hype gained intensity, as performers descended on Sun City. The Indian stars were welcomed by thousands of fans and traditional African dancers. Film enthusiasts swarmed the Sun City. The first ever IIFA World Premiere was held. The film – Lagaan, which went on to win a nomination at the Oscars for the Best Foreign Language Film. An exclusive session with the media at a special Press Meet post show discussed the increasing awareness about Indian Cinema on a global platform. Sun City outshone the sun itself on show day. The venue sparkled as the red carpet awaited its brightest stars. The crowd stirred as limousines rolled in. And the television cameras zoomed in. The hosts for the evening, Miss World Priyanka Chopra and the dashing Kabir Bedi, welcomed the guests. The dances from African Footprint set the rhythm of excitement for the night.

Mohabbatein led the ceremony with 13 nominations, followed by Dhadkan and Kaho Naa... Pyaar Hai with 12 nominations each, and Fiza, Mission Kashmir and Refugee with 7 nominations each.

Kaho Naa... Pyaar Hai won 10 awards, including Best Film, Best Director (for Rakesh Roshan) and Best Actor (for Hrithik Roshan), thus becoming the most-awarded film at the ceremony.

== Awards ==
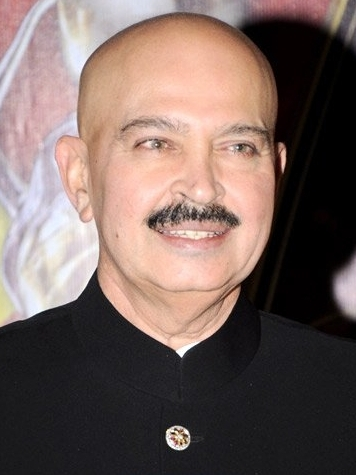
Rakesh Roshan — Best Director winner for Kaho Naa... Pyaar Hai

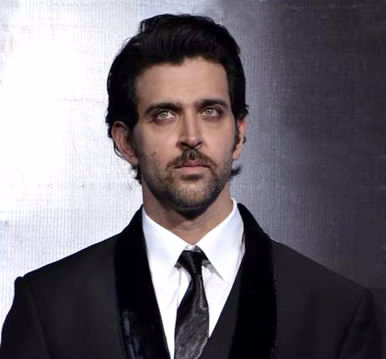
Hrithik Roshan — Best Actor winner for Kaho Naa... Pyaar Hai

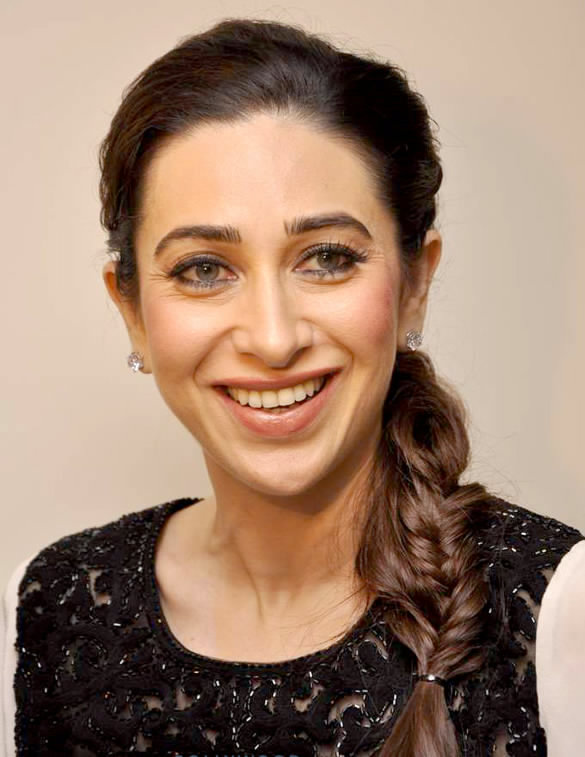
Karisma Kapoor — Best Actress winner for Fiza

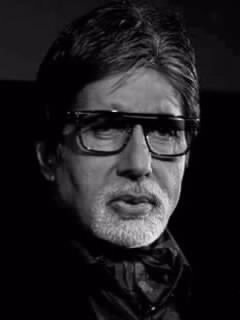
Amitabh Bachchan — Best Supporting Actor winner for Mohabbatein

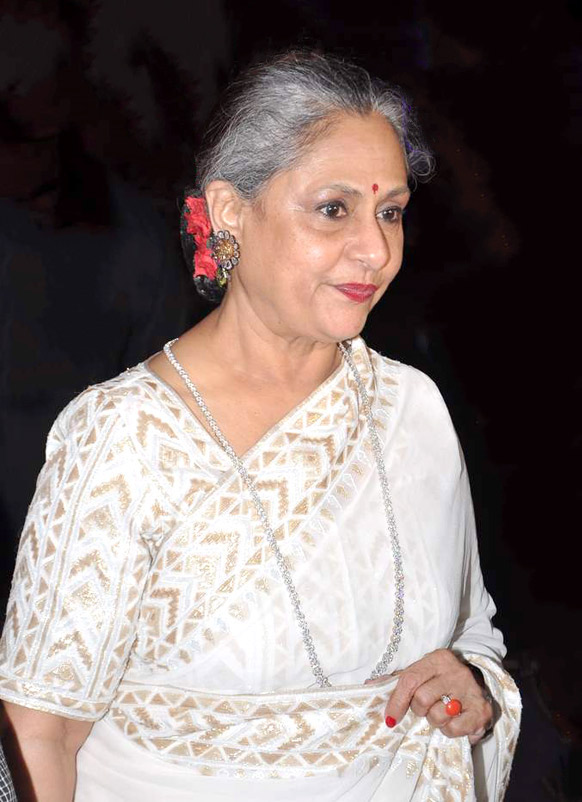
Jaya Bachchan — Best Supporting Actress winner for Fiza

The winners and nominees have been listed below. Winners are listed first, highlighted in boldface, and indicated with a double dagger (‡).

=== Popular Awards ===
Best Film	Best Director
**Kaho Naa... Pyaar Hai**‡; Dhadkan; Kya Kehna; Mission Kashmir; Mohabbatein	**Rakesh Roshan – Kaho Naa... Pyaar Hai**‡; Aditya Chopra – Mohabbatein; Dharmesh Darshan – Dhadkan; Mansoor Khan – Josh; Vidhu Vinod Chopra – Mission Kashmir
Best Actor	Best Actress
**Hrithik Roshan – Kaho Naa... Pyaar Hai**‡; Akshay Kumar – Dhadkan; Anil Kapoor – Pukar; Sanjay Dutt – Mission Kashmir; Shah Rukh Khan – Mohabbatein	**Karisma Kapoor – Fiza**‡; Madhuri Dixit – Pukar; Preity Zinta – Kya Kehna; Shilpa Shetty – Dhadkan; Tabu – Astitva
Best Supporting Actor	Best Supporting Actress
**Amitabh Bachchan – Mohabbatein**‡; Anupam Kher – Kya Kehna; Chandrachur Singh – Josh; Paresh Rawal – Har Dil Jo Pyar Karega; Suniel Shetty – Refugee	**Jaya Bachchan – Fiza**‡; Mahima Chaudhry – Dhadkan; Namrata Shirodkar – Pukar; Sonali Bendre – Hamara Dil Aapke Paas Hai; Sonali Kulkarni – Mission Kashmir
Best Performance in a Negative Role	Best Performance in a Comic Role
**Sushant Singh – Jungle**‡; Jackie Shroff – Mission Kashmir; Manoj Bajpayee – Fiza; Sharad Kapoor – Josh; Suniel Shetty – Dhadkan	**Paresh Rawal – Hera Pheri**‡; Anupam Kher – Mohabbatein; Archana Puran Singh – Mohabbatein; Johnny Lever – Phir Bhi Dil Hai Hindustani; Kader Khan – Dulhan Hum Le Jayenge
Star Debut of the Year – Male	Star Debut of the Year – Female
**Abhishek Bachchan – Refugee**‡; **Hrithik Roshan – Kaho Naa... Pyaar Hai**‡; **Rahul Dev – Champion**‡; **Uday Chopra – Mohabbatein**‡	**Kareena Kapoor – Refugee**‡; **Kim Sharma – Mohabbatein**‡; **Preeti Jhangiani – Mohabbatein**‡; **Shamita Shetty – Mohabbatein**‡
Best Music Director	Best Lyricist
**Rajesh Roshan – Kaho Naa... Pyaar Hai**‡; A. R. Rahman, Anu Malik, Ranjit Barot – Fiza; Anu Malik – Josh; Jatin–Lalit – Mohabbatein; Nadeem–Shravan – Dhadkan; Shankar–Ehsaan–Loy – Mission Kashmir	**Javed Akhtar – "Panchi Nadiya Pawan Ke" – Refugee**‡; Gulzar – "Tu Fiza Hai" – Fiza; Ibrahim Ashk – "Na Tum Jano Na Hum" – Kaho Naa... Pyaar Hai; Sameer Anjaan – "Dil Ne Yeh Kaha Hain Dil Se" – Dhadkan; Sameer Anjaan – "Tum Dil Ki Dhadkan Mein" – Dhadkan
Best Male Playback Singer	Best Female Playback Singer
**Lucky Ali – "Ek Pal Ka Jeena" – Kaho Naa... Pyaar Hai**‡; Abhijeet Bhattacharya – "Tum Dil Ki Dhadkan Mein" – Dhadkan; Sonu Nigam – "Panchi Nadiya Pawan Ke" – Refugee; Udit Narayan – "Aaja Mahiya" – Fiza; Udit Narayan – "Kaho Naa Pyaar Hai" – Kaho Naa... Pyaar Hai	**Alka Yagnik – "Kaho Naa Pyaar Hai" – Kaho Naa... Pyaar Hai**‡; Alka Yagnik – "Dil Ne Yeh Kaha Hain Dil Se" – Dhadkan; Kavita Krishnamurthy – "Aey Dil Laya Hai Bahar" – Kya Kehna; Preeti & Pinky – "Piya Piya" – Har Dil Jo Pyar Karega; Sunidhi Chauhan – "Mehboob Mere" – Fiza

=== Technical Awards ===
Best Story	Best Screenplay
**Aditya Chopra – Mohabbatein**‡; Dharmesh Darshan – Dhadkan; Honey Irani – Kya Kehna; Mansoor Khan – Josh; Rakesh Roshan – Kaho Naa... Pyaar Hai	**Honey Irani – Kya Kehna**‡
Best Dialogue	Best Cinematography
**O. P. Dutta – Refugee**‡	**Binod Pradhan – Mission Kashmir**‡
Best Editing	Best Art Direction
**Sanjay Verma – Kaho Naa... Pyaar Hai**‡	**Nitin Chandrakant Desai – Josh**‡
Best Background Score	Best Choreography
**Aadesh Shrivastava – Refugee**‡	**Farah Khan – "Ek Pal Ka Jeena" – Kaho Naa... Pyaar Hai**‡
Best Costume Design	Best Makeup
**Karan Johar, Manish Malhotra – Mohabbatein**‡	**Jayanti Shevale – Hum Saath-Saath Hain**‡
Best Sound Recording	Best Sound Re-Recording
**Sona Choudhary – Jungle**‡	**Hitendra Ghosh – Jungle**‡
Best Special Effects	Best Song Recording
**Raj Taru (Video Sonic Ltd) – Phir Bhi Dil Hai Hindustani**‡	**Satish Gupta – Kaho Naa... Pyaar Hai**‡

=== Special awards ===
Invaluable Contribution To Indian Cinema
**Shammi Kapoor**	**Waheeda Rehman**
Outstanding Achievement In International Cinema
**Ismail Merchant**
Kelvinator Personality of the Year
**Hrithik Roshan**

== Superlatives ==
Multiple nominations
Nominations	Film
13	Mohabbatein
12	Dhadkan
12	Kaho Naa... Pyaar Hai
7	Fiza
7	Mission Kashmir
7	Refugee
6	Josh
6	Kya Kehna
3	Jungle
3	Pukar
2	Har Dil Jo Pyar Karega
2	Phir Bhi Dil Hai Hindustani

Multiple wins
Awards	Film
9	Kaho Naa... Pyaar Hai
7	Mohabbatein
5	Refugee
3	Jungle
2	Fiza
