= Anu Malik =

Indian music director and singer (born 1960)

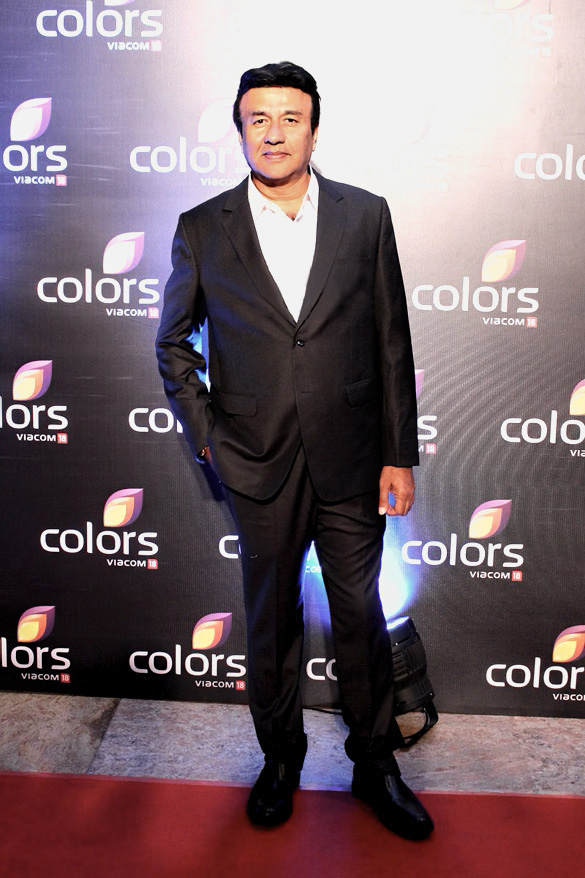
- Anu Malik in 2016
- Born: Anwar Malik; 2 November 1960 (age 66); Mumbai, Maharashtra, India
- Other name: Annu Malik (1978–1992)
- Spouse: Anjali Vasudev Bhat
- Children: Anmol Malik (daughter); Ada Malik (daughter)
- Parent(s): Sardar Malik (father); Bilqis Malik (mother)
- Relatives: Daboo Malik (brother); Amaal Mallik (nephew); Armaan Malik (nephew); Hasrat Jaipuri (maternal uncle)
- Musical career
- Genres: Disco, pop music, rock music, Bollywood
- Occupations: Singer; Composer; Music director; Music arranger
- Instruments: Tabla, dholak, electric guitar, drum kit, harmonium, piano, violin, saxophone
- Years active: 1974–present

Anwar "Anu" Malik (born 2 November 1960) is an Indian music composer, singer, music arranger and score composer. He is the recipient of a National Film Award and three Filmfare Awards, who primarily composes music for the Hindi film industry. He is the son of Sardar Malik, a film composer active from the 1950s to the 1970s, and is noted for his melodious and classical-based compositions.

As a music director, he has composed music for various genres of films, and has created several commercially successful songs for the Hindi (Bollywood) film music industry. Malik is also known for his use of the tabla in some of his songs, including "Woh Ladki Jo" and "Hum Toh Deewane" from the film Baadshah, "Tumhe Jo Maine Dekha" from the film Main Hoon Na, Taal Pe Jab" and "Mere Humsafar" from the film Refugee, "Eli Re Eli" from Yaadein and "Baazigar O Baazigar" from the film Baazigar. Malik's song "Chamma Chamma" from China Gate was featured in the Hollywood film Moulin Rouge! starring Nicole Kidman.

Malik served as a judge on Indian Idol from its first season in 2004 until 2018 when he left after a "Me Too" allegation. He returned as a judge for the show's 11th season in 2019, but left after three weeks, and was one of the judges for part of the 12th season. He was also a judge for the children's reality singing show Sa Re Ga Ma Pa Li'l Champs 2022.

== Music career ==
=== 1975–1984: Early years ===
Malik began his career as a music director in 1975 for comedian-turned-filmmaker Mohan Choti's film Hunterwali 77 (1977) with the stage name Annu Malik. Malik's father Sardar Malik composed most of the songs for the film, with Anu, who was then 16–17 years old, composing only one song "Zulm O Sitam Par Itrane Wale" for the film, sung by Asha Bhosle and written by his maternal uncle Hasrat Jaipuri. The soundtrack went unnoticed but it marked the beginning of his lengthy association with Bhosle. He would then get his first full soundtrack for Harmesh Malhotra's film Poonam (1981) on the recommendation of playback singer Shailendra Singh, whom Malik befriended after listening to the music of Bobby. The film failed at the box office but some songs were noticed, namely "Main Hoon Haseena", "Mohabbat Rang Laye Gi" and "Aa Zara Mere Humnasheen", featuring his rare collaborations with singer Mohammad Rafi, who passed away within days of recording the songs.

Malik continued his collaborations with Harmesh Malhotra with films Aapas Ki Baat (1981) and Mangal Pandey (1982). He also composed music for other films like Paagal Premee (1982) and Ek Jaan Hai Hum (1983) but the films were box office failures. A few songs of the latter film "Aasmaan Pe Likh Doon" and "Yaad Teri Aayegi" received some recognition because of Shabbir Kumar. In 1983, Malik sang his first song as a playback singer "Beete Huay Lamhe" for Nigahen (1983), with music composed by his father Sardar Malik.

Anu Malik gained his first exposure in 1984 with Aasmaan, which featured catchy tracks such as "Banke Nazar Dil Ki Zubaan" rendered by Kishore Kumar and "Time Bomb" rendered by Asha Bhosle and Kishore Kumar, which received critical acclaim. His next soundtrack for the film Sohni Mahiwal released later that year was a huge success and earned him his first nomination for the Filmfare Award for Best Music Director. Malik began getting more recognition and more work after his success in 1984 as he got more soundtracks throughout the mid-1980s but was unable to find a footing in Bollywood due to the rule of Bappi Lahiri, R.D. Burman, Kalyanji-Anandji and Laxmikant-Pyarelal at the time.

=== 1985–1992: Mard and initial breakthrough ===
During his struggle phase, Malik composed his first Indipop album Jadoo (1985) featuring the vocals of playback singer Alisha Chinai as her first private album. Later that year, Malik got his first mainstream breakthrough with Manmohan Desai's film Mard, and songs like "Maa Sheronwali", "Sun Rubiya" "Buri Nazar Wale' and "Mard Taangewala" for which got Malik noticed in Bollywood for the first time. As a result, Malik received more offers to compose songs for films. During this phase, his song "Apno Me Mai Begana" from Begaana became a hit and gained a cult following. In 1987, Malik began full-time playback singing while recording a song "Julie Julie" for Jeete Hain Shaan Se when Kishore Kumar did not show up for recording the song. Kumar's son Amit Kumar was then called for the song but he did not arrive as well and then the film's lead actor Mithun Chakraborty recommended Malik to sing the song. He recorded two more songs for the soundtrack, "Salaam Seth Salaam Seth" and "Rab Roothe Roothe". This soundtrack also marked the first time that he collaborated with Kumar Sanu to record a version of "Julie Julie" with Kavita Krishnamurthy which was not included in the film. However, it would lead to several collaborations with Sanu in the future. "Julie Julie" became a huge hit and the film emerged as a major success at the box office.

He had many soundtracks throughout the following years without much success. He earned acclaim for his music in Awaargi (1990) which featured the famous ghazal "Chamakte Chand Ko Toota Hua" sung by Ghulam Ali. Malik originally composed music in the same style as other music composers during the 1970s and 1980s.

However, in 1990, Malik began changing his music style on the recommendation of Anuradha Paudwal which would become his trademark style. Early songs in that trademark style included "Maa Hi Mandir" by Mohammad Aziz and the hit song "Aaine Ke Sau Tukde" by Kumar Sanu from Maa (1991), "Hum Nahin To Tum Nahin" and "Teri Zulfein Shaam Si Roshan" from Ramgarh Ke Sholay (1991), "Jaanam Jaanam Jaanam" from Virodhi (1992) and "Choone Se Tere" from Dil Ne Ikraar Kiya (1992). Other hit songs during that period included "Dil Diwane Ka Dola Dildaar Ke Liye" from Tahalka (1992) and "Is Pyar Se Meri Taraf Na Dekho" from Chamatkar (1992). It was during this era that he also modified his name to Anu Malik.

=== 1993–2004: Baazigar and continued success in Bollywood music ===
The year 1993 marked a turning point in Malik's career as it was the most successful year of his career at that time. His first release that year was Phool Aur Angaar which was a huge success. Malik received his first taste of success with Mahesh Bhatt's television film Phir Teri Kahani Yaad Aayee which featured superhit songs including "Badalon Mein Chup Raha Hai", "Dil Mein Sanam Ki Soorat" and "Tere Dar Par Sanam Chale Aaye". The success of the film was followed by Bhatt's directorial Sir which had hit songs such as "Sun Sun Barsaat Ki Dhun" and "Yeh Ujli Chandni". His final release of that year was Baazigar which was a huge success with the songs "Baazigar O Baazigar", "Kitabein Bahut Si", "Chhupana Bhi Nahi Aata", "Aye Mere Humsafar" and most notably "Yeh Kaali Kaali Aankhein", for which Malik rapped a few lines. It sold 10 million units and became the year's best selling soundtrack for Bollywood. It catapulted Malik into stardom and established him as one of the top music directors of Bollywood alongside Nadeem-Shravan and Jatin–Lalit. Malik won his first Filmfare Award for Best Music Director for Baazigar at the 39th Filmfare Awards in 1994.

In fact, Malik was the number one music director of Bollywood during 1994 after the release of Baazigar. His popular and successful soundtracks during the year included Khuddar, Imtihaan, Aa Gale Lag Jaa, Vijaypath and Main Khiladi Tu Anari. His success continued with subsequent films Naajayaz (1995), The Gambler (1995), Akele Hum Akele Tum (1995), Chaahat (1996), Diljale (1996), Khiladiyon Ka Khiladi (1996), Daraar (1996), Krishna (1996), Virasat (1997), Judwaa (1997), Border (1997), Ishq (1997), Ankhon Mein Tum Ho (1997), China Gate (1998), Soldier (1998), Hum Aapke Dil Mein Rehte Hain (1999), Jaanam Samjha Karo (1999), Biwi No.1 (1999), Haseena Maan Jaayegi (1999) and Baadshah (1999). He received further nominations for the Filmfare Award for Best Music Director for Main Khiladi Tu Anari, Akele Hum Akele Tum, Border, Soldier, Biwi No.1 and Haseena Maan Jaayegi during the decade. Meanwhile, his songs in Mahesh Bhatt's The Gentleman where criticized for being lifted from A. R. Rahman's compositions for the original Tamil film, to which Malik responded saying "I am an inspired music director. I would never lift the whole thing".

Aside from composing, Malik lent his voice for his compositions on various occasions such as "Maari Gayi" from Jaanam (1992), "My Adorable Darling" and the rapping portion of "Main Khiladi Tu Anari" from Main Khiladi Tu Anari (1994) and "Oonchi Hai Building" and "East or West" from Judwaa (1997). He also released several albums in the Indipop genre which he sang by himself including Tera Chehra (1995), English album Eyes (1997), Lafda Na Ho Jaye (1997) and Ho Raha Hai Sama (1999).

Malik had major success in the year 2000 with best-selling soundtracks including Hera Pheri, Badal, Har Dil Jo Pyar Karega, Aaghaaz, Fiza, Josh and Refugee. His soundtrack for Refugee was critically acclaimed as he became the only music director to win the Filmfare Special Award for his compositions in the movie at the 46th Filmfare Awards. He also received the National Film Award for Best Music Direction for Refugee at the 48th National Film Awards. In 2001, Malik had best-selling albums with Chori Chori Chupke Chupke, Yaadein, Asoka, Lajja, Ajnabee and Mujhe Kucch Kehna Hai. His soundtrack for Mujhe Kucch Kehna Hai earned him his twelfth nomination for the Filmfare Award for Best Music Director and his soundtrack for Asoka earned him a nomination for the Screen Award for Best Music Director. His soundtracks during the year 2002 went unnoticed but he had a resurgence in 2003 with best-selling albums Ishq Vishk, Main Prem Ki Diwani Hoon, Khushi, Munnabhai MBBS and Inteha and LOC: Kargil. He received critical acclaim for LOC: Kargil, which earned him his thirteenth nomination for the Filmfare Award for Best Music Director and won him his first Screen Award for Best Music Direction.

Malik found success with successful best-selling soundtracks such as Main Hoon Na, Murder and Fida in 2004. His soundtrack for Main Hoon Na earned critical acclaim and won Malik his second Filmfare Award for Best Music Director, his second Screen Award for Best Music Director and his first Zee Cine Award for Best Music Director.

=== 2005–present: Later career ===
The mid-2000s marked the rise of a new generation of music directors including A. R. Rahman, Shankar–Ehsaan–Loy, Vishal–Shekhar, Pritam Chakraborty and the amount of Malik's work began reducing after 2005 and he accepted his new role as a regular judge on the reality singing competition show Indian Idol on Sony Entertainment Television, beginning with its first season in 2004. He received a nomination for the Screen Award for Best Music Director for Jaan-E-Mann (2006). The year 2007 marked for the first time since 1983 that Malik composed soundtrack for only one film Undertrial.

Malik remained prominent as a judge for various reality television shows but lost major offers as a music director in the coming years. His recent work includes Kambakkht Ishq (2009), Yamla Pagla Deewana (2011), Shootout at Wadala (2013), Dum Laga Ke Haisha (2015), Begum Jaan (2017) and Sui Dhaaga (2018). He won his second Zee Cine Award for Best Music Director for Dum Laga Ke Haisha, which marked his reunion with Kumar Sanu since No Entry (2005) as well as his first collaboration with Yash Raj Films.

=== Collaborations ===
Malik has worked with many Indian playback singers including Mohammed Rafi, Kishore Kumar, Asha Bhonsle, Amit Kumar, and others. During the '80s, he mostly worked with singers such as Mohammad Aziz, Shabbir Kumar, Manhar Udhas, Suresh Wadkar, Nitin Mukesh and Anwar.

Malik worked with Alisha Chinai to compose the commercially successful singles "Sexy Sexy" and "Ruk Ruk Ruk" from Vijaypath, "Chot Dil Pe Lagi" from Ishq Vishk and the songs from Love Story 2050 and Kambakkht Ishq. He also worked with Indian film lyricist Javed Akhtar in films including Border, Refugee and Umrao Jaan. He also worked with Anuradha Sriram to compose the commercially successful singles "Chunnari Chunnari" from Biwi No. 1, "Dupatta Mera" from Mujhe Kucch Kehna Hai and "Chand Ko Tod Doonga" from Shaadi No. 1.

Kumar Sanu, Udit Narayan and Alka Yagnik have sung in most of the singles composed by Malik. This trio collaborated on films such as: Sir, Phool Aur Angaar, Phir Teri Kahani Yaad Aayee, Vijaypath, Baazigar, Main Khiladi Tu Anari, Imtihaan, Chamatkar, Gambler, Akele Hum Akele Tum, Duplicate, Kareeb, Soldier, Aarzoo, Ajnabee, Ishq Vishk and Fida. Sanu and Yagnik were regular singers for Anu Malik and Malik created many songs individually with Sanu such as "Meri Zindagi Mein Ajnabee" from Ajnabee (2001) and "Aaine Ke Sau Tukde" from Maa (1991) and the single "Yeh Kaali Kaali Aankhen" from Baazigar (1993).

Following the death of music director R. D. Burman, Malik has completed music for Burman's unfinished film projects 1942: A Love Story, Gang and Ghatak.

=== Singer ===
Although he is not a mainstream singer, Malik does playback singing. Written off as a singer in his early days ("Julie Julie," for instance), he continues to sing his own compositions, with songs such as "Aaila Re" from the movie Jung, "Jaanam Samjha Karo" from Jaanam Samjha Karo, "Ek Garam Chaye ki Pyali" from the movie Har Dil Jo Pyar Karega, "Gori Gori" in Main Hoon Na or "Meri Jane Jigar" in Deewane Huye Paagal. Among his works are "Oonchi Hai Building" and "East or West India is the best" from the movie Judwaa. and the rap part of "Yeh Kaali Kaali Aankhen" of Baazigar and "Main Khiladi Tu Anari" of Main Khiladi Tu Anari.

While he sings entire songs for some movies, especially those starring Sunil Shetty, Paresh Rawal, Akshay Kumar and Shahid Kapoor (in Deewane Huye Paagal he sang almost every song), and has also sung as part of a chorus in "Mehbooba Mehbooba" in the film Ajnabee, and "Tumse Milke Dilka Jo Haal" for Main Hoon Na.

== Television career ==
Malik has been one of the judges on the TV show Indian Idol since the show's inception in 2004 until the format of the show changed into Indian Idol Junior in 2013. When Indian Idol returned in 2016 for its 9th season, Malik was again one of the judges, remaining until October 2018 when he left the show following allegations of sexual harassment. Malik returned as a judge in 2019 for the 11th season, but left the show again after three weeks. In the show's 12th season in 2021, Malik appeared as a guest in one episode, and later acted as a replacement judge when the regular judges had to isolate due to the COVID-19 pandemic.

Farah Khan and Malik were the judges for Entertainment Ke Liye Kuch Bhi Karega, a variety entertainment reality show that airs on Sony Entertainment Television (India) on weekdays.

Malik was the only judge from India on Asian Idol, who represented Indian Idol winner Abhijeet Sawant, with other judges Indra Lesmana, Paul Moss, Pilita Corrales, Ken Lim and Siu Black.

== Personal life ==
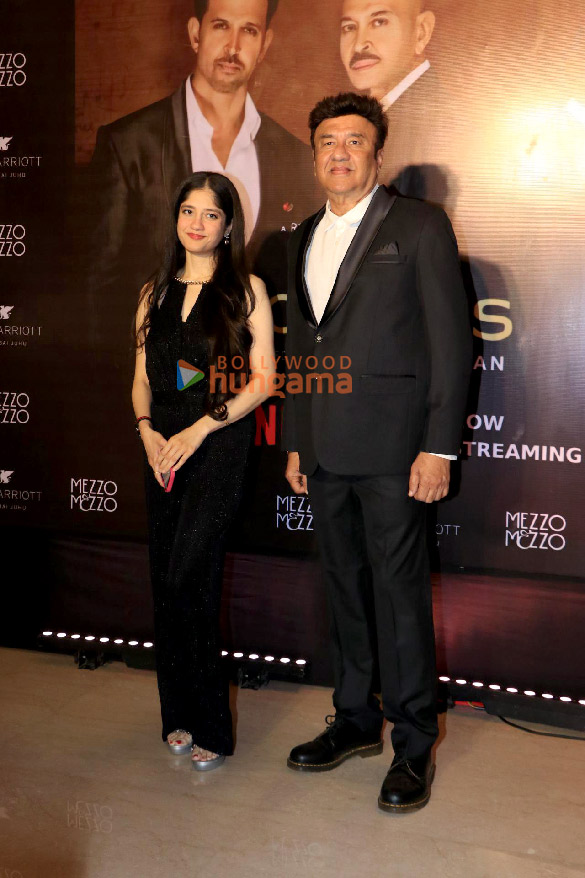
Malik with daughter Ada in 2025

Anu Malik was born to Indian Hindi film music director and score composer Sardar Malik. His brother Daboo Malik is also a music composer. Through Daboo, Anu is the uncle of musicians Amaal Mallik and Armaan Malik. His other brother Abu Malik is a music composer and singer as well, whose son Aadar Malik is an actor and stand-up comedian.

His maternal uncle was the Urdu poet and film lyricist Hasrat Jaipuri.

Malik is married to Anjali Vasudev Bhat and has two daughters Anmol Malik and Ada Malik. His wife is a Saraswat Brahmin Hindu and he is an Arya Samaji and devotee of the Hindu deities Saraswati and Krishna.

== Controversies ==
=== Plagiarism ===
Malik has faced criticism for using music written by other composers, for instance in the film The Gentleman where the music of several songs credited to Malik was composed by A. R. Rahman, and "Mera Piya Ghar Aaya" in Yaarana which was allegedly identical to a song by the same name written by Pakistani Qawwali musician Nusrat Fateh Ali Khan (1948–1997). Khan was reportedly tolerant towards Bollywood music directors plagiarising his songs, but disapproved strongly of Malik's using the music of a song which originally had a religious theme as a secular love song. According to Khan, Malik had repeatedly said to him that he loved his music and was actually showing admiration by using his tunes, and in an interview for IANS Malik dismissed all plagiarism allegations, saying that "no one in this world is original" and claiming that all similarities are due to there being "just seven notes in music".

=== Sexual harassment ===
In October 2018, in the wake of the MeToo movement in India, Malik was accused of sexual harassment by several women in separate claims. One accusation came from singer Shweta Pandit, who said he had made an unwanted sexual pass at her when she was 15 years old. Lyricist Sameer came out in Malik's support, refuting Shweta Pandit's claim, saying that he was present during the audition where the harassment of Pandit was claimed to have happened. Sona Mohapatra and Neha Bhasin also accused Malik of predatory behaviour, while female singer Hema Sardesai came out in Malik's support. Malik denied the allegations, but the public backlash resulted in him leaving as a judge for season 10 of Indian Idol. Alisha Chinai, who had sued Malik for molestation in the 1990s, supported the allegations. Sonu Nigam came out in support of Malik, claiming that he had not seen any proof that the allegations were true. In 2019, Malik was reinstated as a judge on Season 11 of Indian Idol, but later Malik stepped down, claiming that he had decided to take a break as he was unable to focus on his work on the show. On 17 January 2020, the National Commission for Women closed the sexual harassment case on Anu Malik due to lack of substantial evidence, but clarifying that it could be reopened if evidence is provided. Sona Mohapatra criticised the commission's decision.

== Awards and nominations ==
Malik was awarded a Silver Lotus for J.P. Dutta's Refugee and the Filmfare Special Jury Award. He also won the Filmfare Award for Best Music Director for Main Hoon Na and Baazigar.

He is a seven-time winner from 42 nominations for best music director, including 14 nominations for the Filmfare Award for Best Music Director.

=== Filmfare Awards ===
Year	Film	Category	Result
1985	Sohni Mahiwal	Best Music Director	Nominated
1994	Baazigar	Best Music Director	Won
1995	Main Khiladi Tu Anari	Best Music Director	Nominated
1996	Akele Hum Akele Tum	Best Music Director	Nominated
1998	Border	Best Music Director	Nominated
1999	Soldier	Best Music Director	Nominated
2000	Biwi No.1	Best Music Director	Nominated
2000	Haseena Maan Jaayegi	Best Music Director	Nominated
2001	Fiza	Best Music Director	Nominated
2001	Josh	Best Music Director	Nominated
2001	Refugee	Special Award	Won
2002	Mujhe Kucch Kehna Hai	Best Music Director	Nominated
2004	LOC: Kargil	Best Music Director	Nominated
2005	Main Hoon Na	Best Music Director	Won
2005	Murder	Best Music Director	Nominated

=== International Indian Film Academy Awards ===
Year	Film	Category	Result
2000	Haseena Maan Jaayegi	Best Music Director	Nominated
2001	Josh	Best Music Director	Nominated
2001	Fiza	Best Music Director	Nominated
2004	Munna Bhai M.B.B.S.	Best Music Director	Nominated
2004	LOC: Kargil	Best Music Director	Nominated
2005	Main Hoon Na	Best Music Director	Nominated
2005	Murder	Best Music Director	Nominated

=== National Film Award ===
Year	Film	Category	Result
2001	Refugee	Best Music Direction	Won

=== Producers Guild Film Awards ===
Year	Film	Category	Result
2006	Murder	Best Music Director	Nominated
2016	Dum Laga Ke Haisha	Best Music Director	Nominated

=== Screen Awards ===
Year	Film	Category	Result
1995	Main Khiladi Tu Anari	Best Music Director	Nominated
1996	Akele Hum Akele Tum	Best Music Director	Nominated
1998	Border	Best Music Director	Nominated
1998	Virasat	Best Music Director	Nominated
1999	Soldier	Best Music Director	Nominated
2000	Biwi No.1	Best Music Director	Nominated
2000	Hum Aapke Dil Mein Rehte Hain	Best Music Director	Nominated
2001	Fiza	Best Music Director	Nominated
2001	Josh	Best Music Director	Nominated
2002	Aśoka	Best Music Director	Nominated
2004	LOC: Kargil	Best Music Director	Won
2004	Munna Bhai M.B.B.S.	Best Music Director	Nominated
2004	–	Special Tribute Award – Artist of the Decade	Won
2005	Main Hoon Na	Best Music Director	Won
2005	Mujhse Shaadi Karogi	Best Music Director	Nominated
2007	Jaan-E-Mann	Best Music Director	Nominated

=== Zee Cine Awards ===
Year	Film	Category	Result
1998	Border	Best Music Director	Nominated
1998	Ishq	Best Music Director	Nominated
1999	Soldier	Best Music Director	Nominated
2000	Biwi No.1	Best Music Director	Nominated
2000	Hum Aapke Dil Mein Rehte Hain	Best Music Director	Nominated
2001	Fiza	Best Music Director	Nominated
2001	Refugee	Best Music Director	Nominated
2002	Aśoka	Best Music Director	Nominated
2004	LOC: Kargil	Best Music Director	Nominated
2005	Main Hoon Na	Best Music Director	Won
2016	Dum Laga Ke Haisha	Best Music Director	Won

=== Other awards ===
- 2005 – Winner, Popular Award – Best Music Director for Main Hoon Na (2004)
- 2010 – Winner, Asha Bhosle Award – Outstanding Contribution in Music
- 2010 – Winner, Indian Telly Awards – Best reality show judge
- 2014 – Winner, Giants International Awards – Lifetime Achievement in Music
- 2015 – Winner, Big Star Entertainment Awards – 92.7 BIG FM – Suhana Safar Music Award
- 2026 – Winner, Sur Jyotsna National Music Award - Special Award for outstanding contribution to Indian music.

== Sales ==
Year	Film	Sales	Annual Rank
1992	Tahalka	1,500,000	13
1993	Phool Aur Angaar	2,000,000	11
1993	Phir Teri Kahani Yaad Aayee	2,800,000	6
1993	Baazigar	3,000,000	5
1994	Imtihaan	2,800,000	9
1994	Khuddar	2,800,000	8
1994	Vijaypath	3,000,000	7
1994	Main Khiladi Tu Anari	3,000,000	5
1994	The Gentleman	3,000,000	6
1995	Hathkadi	1,800,000	14
1995	Yaraana	2,000,000	13
1995	Akele Hum Akele Tum	2,500,000	8
1995	Gambler	2,200,000	9
1996	Khiladiyon Ka Khiladi	2,000,000	11
1996	Daraar	1,800,000	12
1996	Krishna	2,200,000	7
1996	Judwaa	1,800,000	15
1996	Auzaar	2,200,000	6
1997	Border	4,500,000	4
1997	Ishq	3,000,000	6
1998	Soldier	3,500,000	3
1998	Hum Aapke Dil Mein Rehte Hain	2,200,000	7
1999	Jaanam Samjha Karo	1,800,000	12
1999	Biwi No.1	3,000,000	4
1999	Baadshah	2,500,000	7
1999	Badal	2,000,000	10
2000	Josh	1,800,000	9
2000	Refugee	3,500,000	3
2000	Har Dil Jo Pyar Karega	2,200,000	5
2000	Fiza	2,500,000	4
2000	Chori Chori Chupke Chupke	2,000,000	6
2001	Mujhe Kucch Kehna Hai	3,200,000	2
2001	Yaadein	2,200,000	7
2001	Lajja	1,300,000	15
2001	Ajnabee	2,200,000	6
2001	Asoka	1,500,000	13
2002	Kucch To Hai	900,000	14
2002	Khushi	1,200,000	10
2003	Ishq Vishk	1,200,000	10
2003	Main Prem Ki Diwani Hoon	1,600,000	7
2003	Munnabhai MBBS	1,000,000	14
2003	LOC: Kargil	1,500,000	8
2004	Murder	2,200,000	4
2004	Main Hoon Na	2,100,000	5
2004	Mujhse Shaadi Karogi	2,000,000	6
2004	Fida	1,400,000	10
2005	Zeher	1,800,000	5
2005	Kalyug	1,400,000	11
2006	Jaan-E-Mann	1,250,000	8
