= Refugee (2000 film) =

2000 Indian film by J. P. Dutta

- Poster
- Directed by: J. P. Dutta
- Written by: J. P. Dutta
- Produced by: J. P. Dutta
- Starring: Abhishek Bachchan; Kareena Kapoor; Jackie Shroff; Suniel Shetty
- Cinematography: Basheer Ali
- Edited by: Deepak Y. Wirkud
- Music by: Songs: Anu Malik; Score: Aadesh Shrivastava
- Production company: J. P. Films
- Distributed by: Yash Raj Films
- Release date: 30 June 2000
- Running time: 210 minutes
- Country: India
- Language: Hindi
- Budget: ₹15 crore
- Box office: ₹35.44 crore

Refugee is a 2000 Indian Hindi-language romantic drama film written and directed by J. P. Dutta. It marked the debut of both the leading actors, Abhishek Bachchan and Kareena Kapoor. Jackie Shroff, Suniel Shetty, and Anupam Kher appeared in supporting roles. The film was a moderate success at the box-office and was the fifth highest-grossing film of that year.

It is the story of an unnamed Indian Muslim, who helps illegal refugees from India and Pakistan (including modern-day Bangladesh) cross the border through the Great Rann of Kutch. The film is attributed to being inspired by the short story "Love Across the Salt Desert" by Keki N. Daruwalla.

== Plot ==
Bihar-based Manzur Ahmad and his family had migrated to East Pakistan after the partitioning of India in 1947. However, after the formation of the state of Bangladesh in 1971, he and several other people were forced to relocate to the western part of Pakistan. To do this by land, they will have to cross India. The route from Dhaka leads to Guwahati in India then to Delhi then to Ajmer then to Bhuj, and then on to Haji Peer in Pakistan.

They get as far as Bhuj, but afterward, they are assisted by an agent known only as "Refugee", who helps them trek their way across the Great Rann of Kutch to Pakistan. Refugee considers his clients as mere items of luggage and refuses to be emotionally involved with them and their stories. Then he meets Nazneen Ahmed, the daughter of Manzur Ahmed, and falls in love with her.

Police on both sides of the border are aware of the illegal refugee traffic and the Indian police regularly question Refugee and his elderly father Jan Muhammad. One day, Refugee helps four men enter the Indian side of the border. These men enlist the help of the Refugee's brother to get to Delhi. Shortly thereafter, explosions take place in trains, buses, and buildings in the Indian capital.

Refugee crosses the border once again to visit Nazneen. She asks him to take her with him since her father wants her to marry Mohammad Ashraf, a Pakistan Rangers Officer. While crossing the border through the Rann they are captured by Pakistani Rangers. Refugee is beaten and sent to India on a camel. The Indian BSF captures him and gets him treated in the hospital. The Indians inform him that he unknowingly helped terrorists cross into India and caused several deaths. Refugee joins the BSF and fights the terrorists who laid siege to his village.

The film ends with Nazneen giving birth to Refugee's child at the border between the two nations. Indian BSF and Pakistani Rangers personnel discuss the child's nationality in a lighter vein.

== Cast ==
- Abhishek Bachchan as Refugee
- Kareena Kapoor as Nazneen Ahmed
- Jackie Shroff as BSF Commandant Raghuvir Singh
- Suniel Shetty as Pakistan Rangers Lt. Col Mohammad Ashraf
- Reena Roy as Amina J. Mohammad
- Sudesh Berry as Gul Hamid
- Anupam Kher as Jan Mohammad
- Kulbhushan Kharbanda as Manzur Ahmad
- Shadaab Khan as Shadab J. Mohammad
- Mukesh Tiwari as Tausif, Pakistani Rangers Officer
- Ashish Vidyarthi as Makkad
- Avtar Gill as Atta Mohammad
- Vishwajeet Pradhan as BSF Officer Nagendra
- Puneet Issar as Sikh priest Paras Singh
- Vrajesh Hirjee as BSF Officer Ramesh

== Music ==
Refugee

Soundtrack album by Anu Malik
- Released: 30 June 2000
- Recorded: 1999
- Length: 1:05
- Label: Saregama

The music of the film was composed by Anu Malik with lyrics written by Javed Akhtar. The film's music received two National Film Awards: one for Best Music Direction and the other for Best Lyrics (for the song "Panchhi Nadiyaan". Additionally, Malik also won a Filmfare Special Award for his work in the film. It was one of the highest selling album of the year 2000

Song	Singer(s)	Length	Raga
"Aisa Lagta Hai"	Sonu Nigam, Alka Yagnik	7:28	
"Jise Tu Na Mila"	Sukhwinder Singh, Shankar Mahadevan	10:58	
"Mere Humsafar"	Sonu Nigam, Alka Yagnik	7:50	Kalyan
"Panchi Nadiya Pawan Ke"	Sonu Nigam, Alka Yagnik, Abhishek Bachchan, Kareena Kapoor	9:46	
"Raat Ki Hatheli Par"	Udit Narayan, Alka Yagnik, Abhishek Bachchan, Kareena Kapoor	6:58	
"Taal Pe Jab"	Sonu Nigam, Alka Yagnik	7:13	

=== Reception ===
Taran Adarsh gave the album 4.5 out of 5 stars and praised the songs by saying "The music touches the heart of every listener. Every moment you feel like a heavenly moment." According to the Indian trade website Box Office India, around 35,00,000 albums were sold.

== Production ==
=== Development ===
Refugee is attributed to have been inspired by Love Across The Salt Desert, a story by Keki N. Daruwalla based around the Great Rann of Kutch. It is included as a short-story in the 11 and 12 English textbook for schools of NCERT in India.

=== Casting ===
Bipasha Basu was convinced by Jaya Bachchan to play the role of a village belle opposite her son Abhishek Bachchan in J. P. Dutta’s Aakhri Mughal. However the film was shelved, and Dutta changed the script and made Refugee with Kareena Kapoor. Basu was offered a role in Refugee opposite Suniel Shetty, which she declined. Tabu was signed to play a doctor, however the role was eventually scrapped. Dutta initially wanted Akshaye Khanna to play Shadaab Khan's role but decided against it as he felt the role was too small.

=== Filming ===
The crew, which had travelled from Mumbai, was primarily based in Bhuj, where the majority of filming took place across the Kutch district. Locations included the Great Rann of Kutch—including sections of the “snow-white” Rann under the control of the Border Security Force (BSF)—as well as villages and BSF posts in the Banni Grasslands and surrounding Rann region. Filming also took place at Lakhpat fort and Tera Fort, in a village in southern Kutch, and at several ancient temples in the district. Additional scenes, including a song sequence, were filmed on a set at Kamalistan Studios. Principal photography took place between 1999 and 2000.

== Accolades ==
Award (Note: Awards, festivals and organizations are in alphabetical order.)	Date of ceremony (Note: Date is linked to the article about the awards held that year, wherever possible.)	Category	Recipient(s)	Result	Ref.
Bollywood Movie Awards	28 April 2001	Best Male Debut	Abhishek Bachchan	Nominated	
Bollywood Movie Awards	28 April 2001	Best Female Debut	Kareena Kapoor	Won	
Bollywood Movie Awards	28 April 2001	Best Lyricist	Javed Akhtar for "Panchi Nadiya Pawan Ke"	Won	
Bollywood Movie Awards	28 April 2001	Best Playback Singer Male	Sonu Nigam for "Panchi Nadiya Pawan Ke"	Nominated	
Bollywood Movie Awards	28 April 2001	Best Cinematography	Basheer Ali	Nominated	
Filmfare Awards	17 February 2001	Best Supporting Actor	Suniel Shetty	Nominated	
Filmfare Awards	17 February 2001	Best Male Debut	Abhishek Bachchan	Nominated	
Filmfare Awards	17 February 2001	Best Female Debut	Kareena Kapoor	Won	
Filmfare Awards	17 February 2001	Best Lyricist	Javed Akhtar for "Panchi Nadiya Pawan Ke"	Won	
Filmfare Awards	17 February 2001	Best Male Playback Singer	Sonu Nigam for "Panchi Nadiya Pawan Ke"	Nominated	
Filmfare Awards	17 February 2001	Best Female Playback Singer	Alka Yagnik for "Panchi Nadiya Pawan Ke"	Nominated	
Filmfare Awards	17 February 2001	Best Dialogue	O. P. Dutta	Won	
Filmfare Awards	17 February 2001	Best Cinematography	Basheer Ali	Won	
Filmfare Awards	17 February 2001	Special Award	Anu Malik	Won	
International Indian Film Academy Awards	16 June 2001	Best Supporting Actor	Suniel Shetty	Nominated	
International Indian Film Academy Awards	16 June 2001	Best Male Debut (Note: Tied with Hrithik Roshan for Kaho Naa... Pyaar Hai)	Abhishek Bachchan	Won	
International Indian Film Academy Awards	16 June 2001	Best Female Debut	Kareena Kapoor	Won	
International Indian Film Academy Awards	16 June 2001	Best Background Score	Aadesh Shrivastava	Won	
International Indian Film Academy Awards	16 June 2001	Best Lyricist	Javed Akhtar for "Panchi Nadiya Pawan Ke"	Nominated	
International Indian Film Academy Awards	16 June 2001	Best Male Playback Singer	Sonu Nigam for "Panchi Nadiya Pawan Ke"	Nominated	
International Indian Film Academy Awards	16 June 2001	Best Dialogue	O. P. Dutta	Won	
National Film Awards	12 December 2001	Best Music Direction	Anu Malik	Won	
National Film Awards	12 December 2001	Best Lyrics	Javed Akhtar for "Panchi Nadiya Pawan Ke"	Won	
Screen Awards	20 January 2001	Best Male Debut	Abhishek Bachchan	Nominated	
Screen Awards	20 January 2001	Best Female Debut	Kareena Kapoor	Nominated	
Screen Awards	20 January 2001	Best Lyricist	Javed Akhtar for "Panchi Nadiya Pawan Ke"	Won	
Screen Awards	20 January 2001	Best Male Playback Singer	Sonu Nigam for "Panchi Nadiya Pawan Ke"	Nominated	
Screen Awards	20 January 2001	Best Female Playback Singer	Alka Yagnik for "Panchi Nadiya Pawan Ke"	Won	
Zee Cine Awards	3 March 2001	Best Lyricist	Javed Akhtar for "Panchi Nadiya Pawan Ke"	Won	
Zee Cine Awards	3 March 2001	Lux Face of the Year	Kareena Kapoor	Won	
