= 46th Filmfare Awards =

2001 awards for Hindi cinema

- Date: 17 February 2001
- Site: Mumbai, India
- Hosted by: Malaika Arora; Javed Jaffrey; Karan Johar
- Produced by: Manikchand

Highlights
- Best Film: Kaho Naa... Pyaar Hai
- Critics Award for Best Film: Halo
- Most awards: Kaho Naa... Pyaar Hai (9)
- Most nominations: Mohabbatein (12)

Television coverage
- Network: Sony Entertainment Television (India)

The 46th Filmfare Awards were held on 17 February 2001, to honor the best films of 2000.

Mohabbatein led the ceremony with 12 nominations, followed by Kaho Naa... Pyaar Hai with 11 nominations.

Kaho Naa... Pyaar Hai won 9 awards, including Best Film, Best Director (for Rakesh Roshan), Best Actor and Best Male Debut (both for Hrithik Roshan), thus becoming the most-awarded film at the ceremony.

Hrithik Roshan received dual nominations for Best Actor for his performances in Fiza and Kaho Naa... Pyaar Hai, winning for the latter.

Real-life couple Amitabh Bachchan and Jaya Bachchan were both nominated, and eventually won Best Supporting Actor and Best Supporting Actress respectively, for their performances in Mohabbatein and Fiza.

== Awards ==
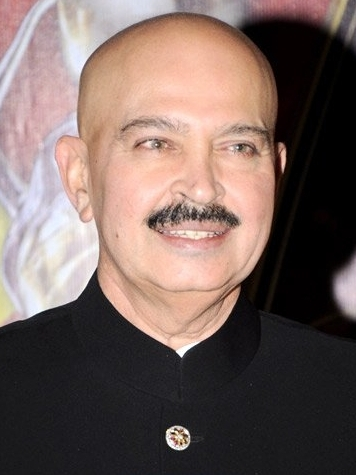
Rakesh Roshan — Best Director winner

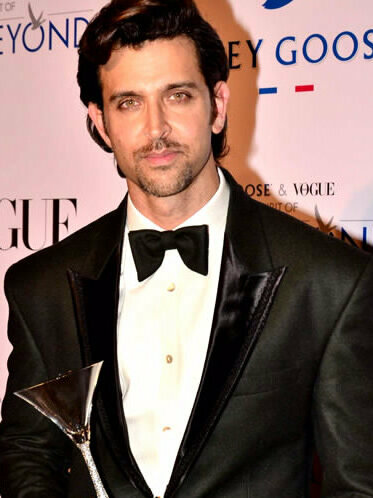
Hrithik Roshan — Best Actor winner

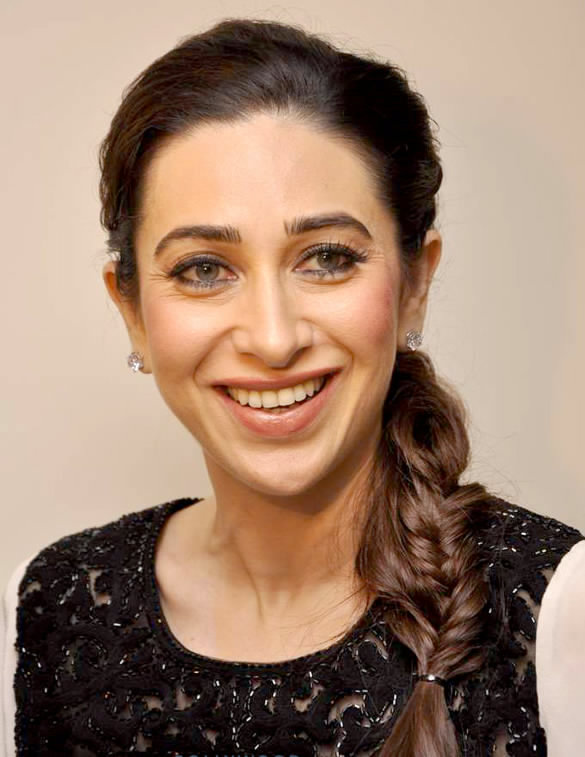
Karisma Kapoor — Best Actress winner

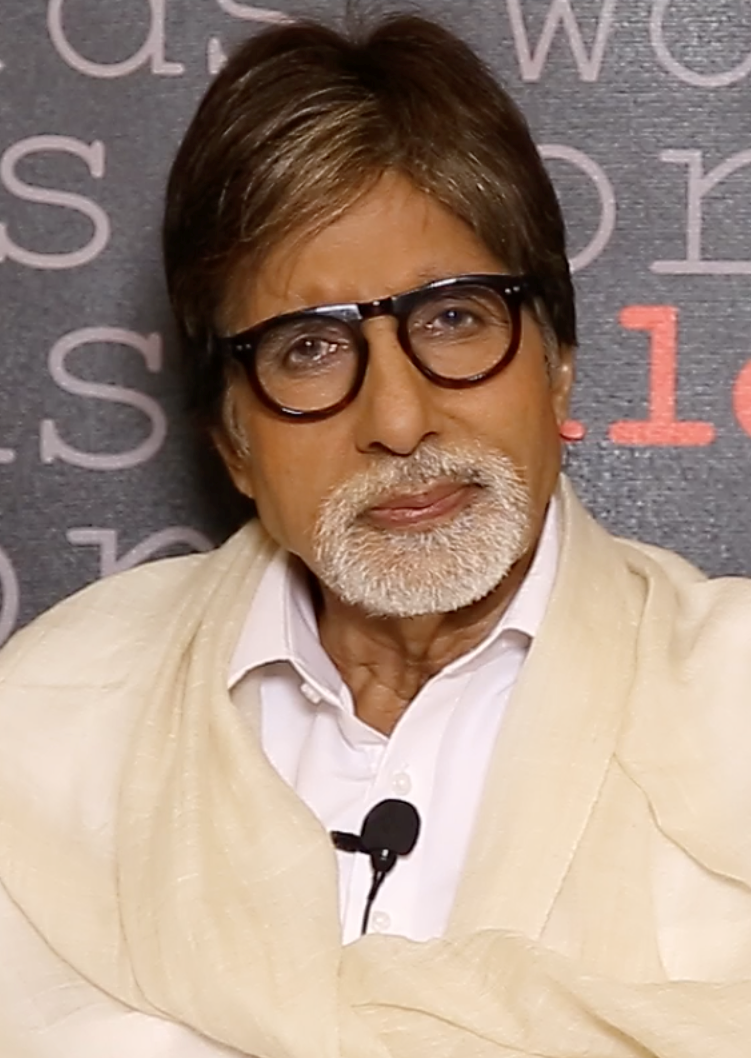
Amitabh Bachchan — Best Supporting Actor winner

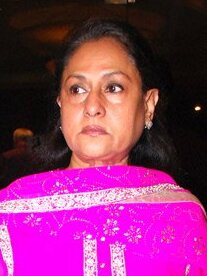
Jaya Bachchan — Best Supporting Actress winner

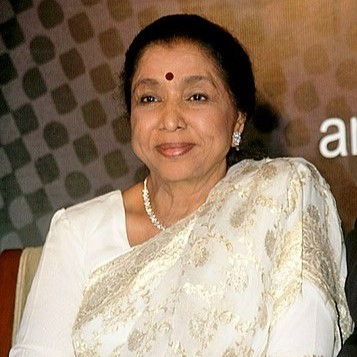
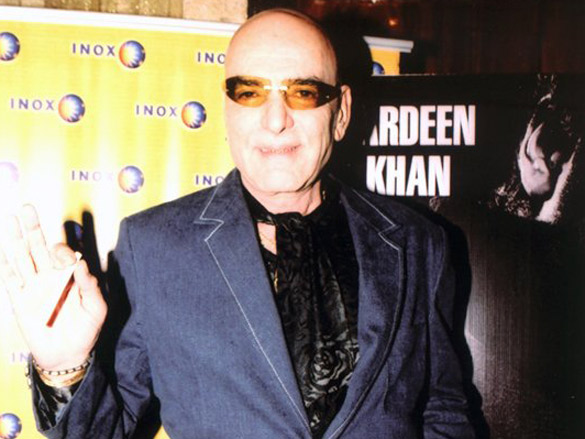
Asha Bhosle and Feroz Khan, Lifetime Achievement Awardees

The winners and nominees are listed below. The winners are listed first, highlighted in boldface, and indicated with a double dagger (‡).

=== Popular Awards ===
Best Film	Best Director
**Kaho Naa... Pyaar Hai**; Dhadkan; Josh; Mission Kashmir; Mohabbatein	**Rakesh Roshan – Kaho Naa... Pyaar Hai**; Aditya Chopra – Mohabbatein; Dharmesh Darshan – Dhadkan; Mansoor Khan – Josh; Vidhu Vinod Chopra – Mission Kashmir
Best Actor	Best Actress
**Hrithik Roshan – Kaho Naa... Pyaar Hai**; Anil Kapoor – Pukar; Hrithik Roshan – Fiza; Sanjay Dutt – Mission Kashmir; Shah Rukh Khan – Mohabbatein	**Karisma Kapoor – Fiza**; Aishwarya Rai – Hamara Dil Aapke Paas Hai; Madhuri Dixit – Pukar; Preity Zinta – Kya Kehna!; Tabu – Astitva
Best Supporting Actor	Best Supporting Actress
**Amitabh Bachchan – Mohabbatein**; Atul Kulkarni – Hey Ram; Chandrachur Singh – Kya Kehna!; Sayaji Shinde – Kurukshetra; Suniel Shetty – Refugee	**Jaya Bachchan – Fiza**; Aishwarya Rai – Mohabbatein; Mahima Chaudhry – Dhadkan; Rani Mukerji – Har Dil Jo Pyar Karega; Sonali Kulkarni – Mission Kashmir
Best Performance in a Negative Role	Best Performance in a Comic Role
**Suniel Shetty – Dhadkan**; Govinda – Shikari; Jackie Shroff – Mission Kashmir; Rahul Dev – Champion; Sharad Kapoor – Josh	**Paresh Rawal – Hera Pheri**; Anupam Kher – Dulhan Hum Le Jayenge; Govinda – Kunwara; Johnny Lever – Kunwara; Johnny Lever – Phir Bhi Dil Hai Hindustani
Best Music Director	Best Lyricist
**Kaho Naa... Pyaar Hai – Rajesh Roshan**; Dhadkan – Nadeem-Shravan; Fiza – Anu Malik; Josh – Anu Malik; Mohabbatein – Jatin–Lalit	**Refugee – Javed Akhtar for Panchi Nadiya**; Dhadkan – Sameer for Tum Dil Ki Dhadkan Main; Fiza – Gulzar for Aaja Mahiya; Kaho Naa... Pyaar Hai – Ibrahim Ashk for Na Tum Jaano Na Hum; Mohabbatein – Anand Bakshi for Humko Humise Churaalo
Best Male Playback Singer	Best Female Playback Singer
**Kaho Naa... Pyaar Hai – Lucky Ali for Na Tum Jaano Na Hum**; Dhadkan – Udit Narayan for Dil Ne Yeh Kaha Hai Dil Se; Fiza – Sonu Nigam for Tu Hawa Hai; Kaho Naa... Pyaar Hai – Lucky Ali for Ek Pal Ka Jeena; Mohabbatein – Udit Narayan for Humko Humise Churaalo; Refugee – Sonu Nigam for Panchi Nadiya	**Dhadkan – Alka Yagnik for Dil Ne Yeh Kaha Hai Dil Se**; Fiza – Sunidhi Chauhan for Mehboob Mere; Har Dil Jo Pyar Karega – Preeti & Pinky for Piya Piya; Josh – Alka Yagnik for Haye Mera Dil; Refugee – Alka Yagnik for Panchi Nadiya

=== Critics' awards ===
Best Film
**Santosh Sivan – Halo**
Best Actor	Best Actress
**Shah Rukh Khan** **– Mohabbatein**	**Tabu – Astitva**

=== Technical Awards ===
Best Story	Best Screenplay
Kya Kehna! – Honey Irani	Kaho Naa... Pyaar Hai – Ravi Kapoor and Honey Irani
Best Dialogue	Best Action
Refugee – J. P. Dutta	Mission Kashmir – Allan Amin
Best Background Score	Best Choreography
Jungle – Sandeep Chowta	Kaho Naa... Pyaar Hai – Farah Khan for Ek Pal Ka Jeena
Best Editing	Best Sound
Kaho Naa... Pyaar Hai – Sanjay Verma	Mohabbatein – Anuj Mathur
Best Cinematography
Refugee – Basheer Ali

=== Special awards ===
Lifetime Achievement Award
**Feroz Khan**	**Asha Bhosle**
Best Male Debut
**Hrithik Roshan – Kaho Naa... Pyaar Hai**
Best Female Debut
**Kareena Kapoor – Refugee**
R. D. Burman Award
**Sunidhi Chauhan**
Special Jury Award
**Anu Malik – Refugee**

== See also ==
- 47th Filmfare Awards
- 49th Filmfare Awards
