= Mohabbatein =

2000 Indian film by Aditya Chopra

- Theatrical release poster
- Directed by: Aditya Chopra
- Written by: Aditya Chopra
- Produced by: Yash Chopra
- Starring: Amitabh Bachchan; Shah Rukh Khan; Aishwarya Rai
- Cinematography: Manmohan Singh
- Edited by: V. Karnik
- Music by: Jatin–Lalit
- Production company: Yash Raj Films
- Release date: 27 October 2000
- Running time: 215 minutes
- Country: India
- Language: Hindi
- Budget: ₹13–19 crore
- Box office: ₹92 crore

Mohabbatein (transl. Romances) is a 2000 Indian Hindi-language musical romantic drama film written and directed by Aditya Chopra, and produced by Yash Chopra under the banner of Yash Raj Films. The film stars Amitabh Bachchan Shah Rukh Khan and Aishwarya Rai, alongside Uday Chopra, Shamita Shetty, Jugal Hansraj, Kim Sharma, Jimmy Sheirgill, and Preeti Jhangiani. It narrates the story of Narayan Shankar, the authoritarian principal of Gurukul, a prestigious all-boys institution, who strictly forbids romantic relationships. His former student, Raj, returns to the institute as a music teacher, and aids three young students to rebel against Narayan's intolerance of love.

Aditya Chopra had written the script of Mohabbatein before the release of his directorial debut Dilwale Dulhania Le Jayenge (1995). Principal photography took place primarily in the United Kingdom between October 1999 and July 2000. The music of the film was composed by Jatin–Lalit, with lyrics written by Anand Bakshi.

Mohabbatein was released on 27 October 2000 and received positive reviews from critics who praised the performances, music, and production design. The film was a commercial success, grossing ₹900 million (US$9.6 million) worldwide to become the highest grossing film of the year. At the 46th Filmfare Awards, it won four awards including Best Supporting Actor (Bachchan) and Critics Best Actor (Khan).

== Plot ==
Narayan Shankar has been the principal of Gurukul, a prestigious all-boys school, for 25 years. He firmly believes in tradition, honour and discipline and is particularly opposed to any kind of romance, threatening to expel any student who falls in love. Raj Aryan soon joins Gurukul as a Music teacher. Raj's belief on spreading romance angers Narayan to the point that he eventually decides to fire Raj. At this point, Raj reveals he is actually Raj Malhotra, a former student of Gurukul who was expelled many years ago for falling in love with Narayan's only daughter, Megha, who killed herself after Narayan expelled Raj. Raj promises to honour Megha's memory by spreading love throughout Gurukul to override Narayan's tradition, honour and discipline, a challenge which Narayan accepts.

At the backdrop of this battle are three students, Sameer, Vicky and Karan, all of whom are in love. Sameer is in love with his childhood sweetheart, Sanjana, who is already in a relationship with Deepak. Raj manages to get Sameer a job as a waiter in a cafe outside of Gurukul so he can be closer to Sanjana. However, when Deepak mistreats Sanjana, she realizes that Sameer is her true soulmate and the two get together. Vicky is in love with Ishika, a student from the neighbouring girls' school. Although Vicky harasses Ishika and blackmails her into a hug and then a date, when the two are paired for a dance competition, they fall in love though Vicky lies to her about his family’s class status to impress her. He eventually tells Ishika the truth and she accepts him. Karan falls in love with a widowed woman named Kiran; with Raj's help, he manages to get a job as a piano teacher for Kiran's nephew and slowly wins over Kiran's love, despite her initially being distant.

Narayan realises that Sameer, Vicky and Karan are forcing students to break the rules. In retaliation, he decides to tighten the rules. However, Raj continues to encourage the boys to fall in love. Eventually, the three boys face expulsion as Narayan views their actions as the reason for the other boys rebelling. Raj speaks out on their behalf, persuading Narayan that what they did was Raj's fault, begging Narayan to not expel them. Narayan agrees, but on the condition that Raj leaves after telling the student body he had misguided them in an attempt to persuade Raj that he has won. However, Raj reminds Narayan of how his daughter left him and how Raj himself, who considered Narayan an elder, is now also leaving him. Reflecting on Raj's words, Narayan now realises that his anti-romance policies have been misguided and also caused the death of his own daughter. The following morning, Narayan openly apologises to his students and steps down as principal, asking Raj to take over and spread his beliefs of love to all the students.

== Cast ==
- Amitabh Bachchan as Narayan Shankar
- Shah Rukh Khan as Raj Aryan Malhotra
- Aishwarya Rai as Megha Shankar
- Jimmy Sheirgill as Karan Choudhary
- Jugal Hansraj as Sameer Sharma
- Uday Chopra as Vikram "Vicky" Kapoor/Vikram Oberoi
- Shamita Shetty as Ishika “Isha” Dhanrajgir
- Kim Sharma as Sanjana “Sanju” Paul
- Preeti Jhangiani as Kiran Khanna
- Amrish Puri as Major General Khanna (special appearance)
- Shefali Shah as Nandini Khanna
- Anupam Kher as Kakke
- Archana Puran Singh as Preeto
- Helen as Miss Monica (special appearance)
- Parzaan Dastur as Ayush Khanna
- Saurabh Shukla as Tom Paul
- Ram Mohan as Khan Baba
- Meghna Patel as Aanchal
- Sindhu Tolani as Malini
- Raman Lamba as Deepak Singhania
- Rushad Rana as Rushad

== Production ==
=== Development ===
Prior to the production of Dilwale Dulhania Le Jayenge (1995), Aditya Chopra had begun writing Mohabbatein as his intended directorial debut. However, he considered the subject matter of Mohabbatein too mature for a first film and instead made Dilwale Dulhania Le Jayenge his debut, postponing Mohabbatein to be his second directorial project. Chopra briefly considered making a thriller for his sophomore film, but ultimately returned to Mohabbatein, explaining: "I realised that there is something in that story that keeps drawing me to it, so one day I just shut my thriller file and casually picked up my [...] Mohabbatein file—that one simple action decided my second film for me."

Writing resumed following the release of Dil To Pagal Hai (1997), with Chopra aiming to explore themes beyond conventional romance. According to the Encyclopaedia of Hindi Cinema, the narrative was inspired by the 1989 American coming-of-age drama Dead Poets Society. Chopra presented the story to his father, producer Yash Chopra, who was impressed and agreed to produce the film under the Yash Raj Films banner. In an interview with Screen, Yash Chopra described the project as “a modern film, a film about today,” adding that it upheld Indian values while appealing to a broad audience.

The film was officially announced in June 1999 on the Yash Raj Films website.

=== Casting ===
"It was not easy at all but I wanted faces which were not seen every Friday. I wanted fresh faces, talented faces, naturally young faces, basically youngsters who would be willing to learn, faces who could understand the truth about what this thing they called Mohabbatein was all about and more than any thing else I wanted them to understand every minute detail of the script as conceived by me."

— Aditya Chopra on the film's casting

Amitabh Bachchan was cast in Mohabbatein during a period of financial failure. Deeply in debt, he walked to Chopra's house and said, "Look, I don't have a job, nobody is giving me work anymore, my movies aren't working, and I've come to ask you to please give me a film to work in." Chopra immediately offered him a role in Mohabbatein, a role which would reboot Bachchan's career. Kajol was initially considered for the role of Megha but declined due to her recent marriage. Aishwarya Rai was then cast to replace her.

To portray the six student characters, Chopra sought out new talent. His brother Uday Chopra was cast in one of the male lead roles marking his acting debut, and a national search was conducted to find five additional newcomers. The final ensemble included Shamita Shetty, Jugal Hansraj, Kim Sharma, Jimmy Sheirgill, and Preeti Jhangiani. Aditya Chopra also wrote the screenplay and dialogues for the film.

=== Filming ===
Principal photography began on 25 October 1999 and took place primarily in the United Kingdom. The historic Longleat estate in Wiltshire was used to represent the fictional Gurukul boarding school. The cinematography was handled by Manmohan Singh. Karan Johar designed the costumes for Khan and Bachchan, while Manish Malhotra styled Rai. Farah Khan served as the film’s choreographer.

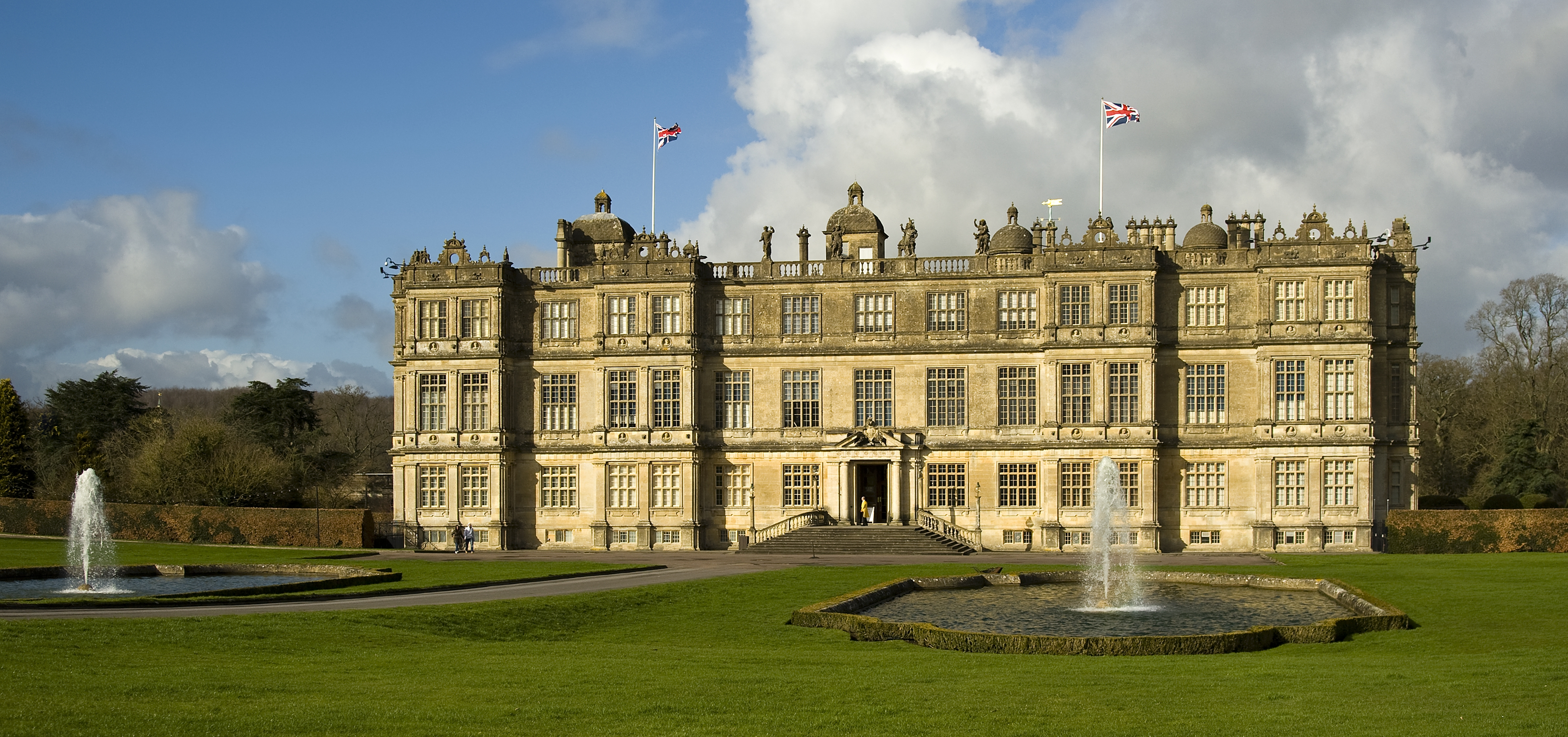
The Longleat house was shot in England as the Gurukul School

Sharmishta Roy worked as the production designer. She recalled the experience as creatively demanding, particularly in personalising each space to reflect the narrative. “The challenge is in individualising, in personalising each house to suit the script and the characters,” she told Rediff.com. Roy designed 13 to 14 distinct sets for the film, including Narayan Shankar’s stone-heavy office, for which she sourced props from Lohar Chawl in Mumbai.

Filming concluded between August and September 2000.

== Music ==
The music for Mohabbatein was composed by the duo Jatin–Lalit, with lyrics written by Anand Bakshi. Vocals for the younger cast members were performed by debut singers Ishaan (for Jimmy Sheirgill), Manohar Shetty (for Jugal Hansraj), Pritha Mazumdar (for Shamita Shetty), Shweta Pandit (for Kim Sharma), Sonali Bhatawdekar (for Preeti Jhangiani), and Udhbhav (for Uday Chopra). In an interview with Rediff.com, Lalit stated that using new voices for the newcomers was intended to give the album a fresh tonal quality, although he and Jatin faced challenges in matching the vocal textures to the actors. Established playback singers Lata Mangeshkar, Udit Narayan, and Jaspinder Narula lent their voices to Aishwarya Rai Bachchan, Shah Rukh Khan, and Archana Puran Singh’s characters, respectively.

The soundtrack album comprises seven original songs and two instrumental tracks, and was released on 21 January 2000 by Saregama, which acquired the music rights for ₹75 million (US$1.67 million). Although critical reception was mixed, the album was a major commercial success, becoming the highest-selling Bollywood soundtrack of the year with over five million units sold.

Jatin–Lalit received a nomination for Best Music Director at the 46th Filmfare Awards, and were also nominated in the same category at the Bollywood Movie Awards, the IIFA Awards and the Screen Awards.

== Release ==
Mohabbatein was among the most anticipated Hindi films of 2000, generating significant pre-release buzz and heightened audience expectations. A special preview screening was held on 8 October 2000 at Film City, Mumbai, attended by director Aditya Chopra, Amitabh Bachchan and his son Abhishek Bachchan, Shah Rukh Khan and his wife Gauri Khan, and filmmaker Karan Johar.

The film was released theatrically on 27 October 2000, coinciding with the Diwali festival weekend. It opened alongside Vidhu Vinod Chopra's thriller Mission Kashmir and K. S. Ravikumar's Tamil-language comedy-drama Thenali, resulting in a highly competitive box-office period. Due to its extended running time of over three and a half hours, theatres limited screenings to three shows per day instead of the usual four.

== Reception ==
=== Box office ===
Mohabbatein was opened on 315 screens across India and grossed ₹11.9 million (US$264,796.92) on the first day. The film collected ₹706.2 million (US$15.71 million) in India and $4.2 million overseas. Box Office India estimated the film's total gross to be ₹900.1 million (US$20.03 million), making it the highest-grossing Indian film of the year. It ran at theatres for over 175 days, becoming a silver jubilee film. (Note: A silver jubilee film is one that completes a theatrical run of 25 weeks or 175 days.)

=== Critical response ===
The film received mixed-to-positive reviews upon release. Savera R. Someshwar of Rediff.com called it "a mish-mash alright. But it is also a successful, feel-good film," noting that the confrontations between Amitabh Bachchan and Shah Rukh Khan created "an expectant hush" every time they appeared together. Taran Adarsh of Bollywood Hungama rated the film 3 out of 5 stars, praising Aditya Chopra’s handling of the drama and character dynamics: "Not once do you feel that the writer in Chopra has tilted on any one side."

Other critics were less favorable. Vinayak Chakravorty of the Hindustan Times described the film as "a veritable lesson to any budding filmmaker on how not to make a film," citing issues with scripting and directorial treatment. Vinaya Hagde of Zee Next gave a scathing review, calling the film "dumb" and criticising the underutilisation of supporting actors such as Anupam Kher and Archana Puran Singh. The Hindu’s Savitha Padmanabhan expressed dissatisfaction with the film’s length and its structure, saying the confrontational sequences were "always interrupted by the love stories of the teenyboppers."

A Filmfare reviewer, however, praised the lead performances, stating that both Bachchan and Khan "excelled in their respective roles." Nikhat Kazmi referred to the film as emblematic of the "inglorious uncertainties of cinema," while Khalid Mohamed likened it to "a rich, multi-layered, vibgyor cake"—though he noted that "only a few slices tickle the taste-buds." Suman Tarafdar, also writing for Filmfare, felt many cast members appeared "unconvinced about their roles and perform[ed] accordingly."

Screen acknowledged Chopra’s "untiring efforts," highlighting his "mastery over screenplay" in the film’s first half. Comparing the film to Dilwale Dulhania Le Jayenge (1995), Dinesh Raheja of India Today remarked that Mohabbatein had "too many diverse strands" and a "disappointingly pat and oversimplified" story.

== Home media and streaming ==
The film’s satellite rights were acquired by Sony Entertainment Television, and it was available for streaming on platforms such as Amazon Prime Video and Apple TV+ since 18 November 2016. Since 1 November 2025, it is available to stream on Netflix as part of Yash Raj Films new contract with the company.
