= Kaho Naa... Pyaar Hai =

2000 Indian film by Rakesh Roshan

Kaho Naa ... Pyaar Hai
- Theatrical Poster
- Directed by: Rakesh Roshan
- Screenplay by: Ravi Kapoor; Honey Irani
- Story by: Rakesh Roshan
- Produced by: Rakesh Roshan
- Starring: Hrithik Roshan; Ameesha Patel; Anupam Kher; Dalip Tahil; Mohnish Bahl
- Cinematography: Kabir Lal
- Edited by: Sanjay Verma
- Music by: Rajesh Roshan
- Production company: Filmkraft Productions Pvt. Ltd.
- Distributed by: Yash Raj Films; Eros International (Overseas)
- Release date: 14 January 2000
- Running time: 177 minutes
- Country: India
- Language: Hindi
- Budget: ₹8 crore
- Box office: ₹88 crore

Kaho Naa... Pyaar Hai (transl. Say It... It's Love ) also known by its initialism KNPH, is a 2000 Indian Hindi-language musical romantic action film written, directed, and produced by Rakesh Roshan. The film marked the acting debuts of Hrithik Roshan and Ameesha Patel, and features a supporting cast that includes Anupam Kher, Dalip Tahil, Mohnish Bahl, Ashish Vidyarthi, Satish Shah, Farida Jalal, Asha Patel, Rajesh Tandon, and Tannaz Irani. The interval twist and the second half of the film draws thematic inspiration from the 1986 Kannada film Ratha Sapthami. Upon its release on 14 January 2000, the film became an instant blockbuster and earned over ₹800 million (US$17.8 million) worldwide, becoming the second highest-grossing Bollywood film of 2000.

Kaho Naa... Pyaar Hai received positive reviews from critics with praise towards Hrithik Roshan's performance and music, but criticized its "clichéd" plot. Hrithik Roshan became an overnight superstar, where his debut was termed Hrithik Mania and he has been known as the Millennial Superstar. The film went on to be inducted into the Guinness World Records (2002) for being a feature film with the most awards won a total of 92 awards received in numerous ceremonies and categories.

The film would be added to the Limca Book of Records for the greatest number of awards won by a Hindi film. As director and producer, Rakesh Roshan collected his first ever Filmfare Award, while his son became the only actor ever to win both the Filmfare Award for Best Actor and the Filmfare Award for Best Debut for the same film.

Kaho Naa... Pyaar Hai was re-released on 10 January 2025 to commemorate the film's twenty-fifth anniversary and coinciding with Hrithik Roshan's 51st birthday.

== Plot ==
Rohit, a talented but struggling singer who works at a car showroom, lives with his younger brother Amit. Orphaned young, they were raised kindly by their childless neighbours, Lily and Anthony. Rohit meets Sonia, the daughter of wealthy industrialist Mr. Saxena, and despite their different backgrounds, they become close. Sonia is attracted to Rohit’s sincerity and charm.

During a cruise organised by Sonia’s friend Atul, the son of Rohit’s boss Shakti Malik, Sonia becomes jealous of the attention Rohit receives from other girls. After a drunken quarrel, they drift away in a lifeboat and become stranded on a deserted island. Their differing personalities initially cause conflict, but when Sonia jokingly pretends to drown, Rohit attempts to save her despite being unable to swim and nearly dies. Sonia rescues him, and the experience leads them to realise their feelings and fall in love.

Saxena eventually rescues them but objects to their relationship because of Rohit’s background, costing Rohit his job. Rohit insists that he has not eloped with Sonia, arguing that doing so would diminish their love, and vows to marry her only after becoming independent. Impressed by his integrity, Saxena begins to accept him. With Atul and his friends’ help, Rohit records a song to launch his career.

Unknown to them, Malik and Saxena secretly operate a drug cartel with corrupt police officers Kadam and Shinde. On the night of his debut concert, Rohit travels to Amit’s school to take him to the performance and accidentally witnesses the group murdering the police commissioner, who had discovered their drug operation. The criminals pursue Rohit, and Malik informs Saxena, who orders his death. Rohit escapes their initial attack, but his sabotaged motorcycle plunges from a highway into the water, and he drowns. His body is never found.

Sonia is devastated, while Amit becomes mute. Saxena sends Sonia to New Zealand, where she meets Raj Chopra, her cousin’s best friend. Raj is a gifted singer who looks exactly like Rohit, making Sonia wonder whether Rohit survived. She learns that Raj is a New Zealander of Indian origin who has never visited India and has no connection to Rohit. Raj falls in love with Sonia, but she keeps her distance because of her grief. After seeing photographs of Rohit, Raj is astonished by their resemblance. He follows Sonia to Mumbai to persuade her not to give up on life, then bids her farewell.

In Mumbai, Shinde mistakes Raj for Rohit and shoots him. Raj survives and realises that Rohit’s death was likely murder. He joins Sonia, Amit, Tony and Rohit’s other loved ones in investigating the case. Amit eventually speaks again and reveals that Malik acted on the orders of an unknown figure called "Sirjee". Raj revives Rohit’s cancelled concert, drawing the criminals into the open. After Saxena betrays him to Malik, Raj narrowly survives another attempt on his life.

The cartel kidnaps Sonia, but Raj rescues her and kills the corrupt policemen, avenging Rohit. Malik confesses that he murdered Rohit for witnessing the commissioner’s murder, but dies before naming the mastermind. Raj recovers Malik’s phone and discovers that Saxena is "Sirjee", the cartel’s true leader. After his arrest, Saxena confesses and apologises to Raj and Sonia.

Afterwards, Raj prepares to return to New Zealand with Amit. Having found closure, Sonia reciprocates his love, and their engagement is joyfully celebrated.

== Cast ==
- Hrithik Roshan in a dual role as:
  - Rohit Kumar: Amit's brother and Sonia's love-interest who is murdered in a bike accident after witnessing Commissioner's murder
  - Raj Chopra: Rohit's look-alike; Amit's adoptive brother and Sonia’s fiancé who avenges Rohit's culprits after facing attacks from them for him being assumed Rohit
- Ameesha Patel as Sonia Saxena: Rohit's love-interest and Raj's fiancée (voice dubbed by Mona Ghosh Shetty)
- Anupam Kher as Mr. Saxena / Sirjee: Sonia's father who ordered Shakti to kill Rohit
- Dalip Tahil as Shakti Malik: Atul's father, Mr. Saxena's friend; Rohit's former boss and one of his and Commissioner's murderer
- Mohnish Behl as Inspector Dilip Kadam: A corrupt officer in Mr. Saxena's payroll and one of Commissioner and Rohit's murderer
- Ashish Vidyarthi as Inspector Satish Shinde: A corrupt officer in Mr. Saxena's payroll and one of Commissioner and Rohit's murderer
- Satish Shah as Anthony Rodriques: Rohit and Amit's landlord; Lily's husband
- Farida Jalal as Lily Rodriques/Aunty: Rohit and Amit's landlady; Anthony's wife
- Rajesh Tandon as Atul Malik: Shakti's son and Sonia's best-friend and Rohit's friend who helps Raj re-organise to catch Rohit's murderer
- Asha Patel as Neha Chopra: Raj's mother
- Tannaz Irani as Neeta Saxena: Sonia's cousin and Raj's best-friend
- Vrajesh Hirjee as Tony Bahl: Rohit's best-friend
- Abhishek Sharma as Amit Kumar: Rohit's younger brother and murder witness and Raj's adoptive brother
- Parzan Dastur as Mischievous Boy on Plane
- Johnny Lever as Inspector Parab Sharma
- Ram Mohan as Commissioner Verma: His murder was witnessed by Rohit leading to his own murder
- Payal Malhotra as Shobha Malvade: A girl on cruise attracted towards Rohit

== Production ==
=== Development ===
Initially, when the film was announced in March 1998, Shahrukh Khan was offered the lead role for the film. However, Hrithik Roshan stated that he was tired of his father doing films with the Khans and suggested that him to give someone else a chance. Rakesh Roshan then agreed and gave the role to his son.

The film was then launched several months later, with Hrithik and Kareena Kapoor in lead roles. However, the latter walked out a few days after the launch, following a "misunderstanding" between the director Rakesh Roshan and Kareena's mother Babita. Rakesh, who had known Ameesha Patel's family for a long time, cast her in the role within three days.

The ship scenes were filmed aboard the Star Flyer. The island scenes were filmed in Krabi, Thailand, in the area near Khao Phing Kan (popularly known as James Bond Island). The iconic Na Tum Jano Na Hum song and additional scenes were filmed in New Zealand, namely Christchurch and Queenstown.

=== Filming accidents ===
In 2001, Hrithik Roshan revealed that, "He nearly drowned while shooting Rohit's death sequence in the movie as he had to spend three hours forty-five feet deep inside the sea for same", while on the occasion of film and lead actors completing twenty-five years in industry following its theatrical re-release in January 2025, Ameesha Patel too revealed the same that, "Hrithik could have drowned and lost his life while shooting Rohit's death sequence in New Zealand as he was shooting inside deep water for hours without oxygen with him" along with revealing that, "While shooting climax sequence where his second character Raj had to take a leap, Hrithik broke his back as he fell while performing same and they had to rush him to hospital at 03:00 AM and film's climax shooting got delayed by six months due to him getting complete bedrest and rehab for same".

== Soundtrack ==
The film's music was composed by Rajesh Roshan with lyrics by Ibrahim Ashk, Saawan Kumar Tak and Vijay Akela. Most of the songs were sung by Lucky Ali, Udit Narayan and Alka Yagnik meanwhile Kumar Sanu, Babul Supriyo and Asha Bhosle too having singles with Narayan and Sanu singing distinctively for character Rohit in first half of the film while Ali and Supriyo singing distinctively for character Raj in second half. The dancing sequences were choreographed by Farah Khan. The songs "Chand Sitare" and most notably, "Dil Ne Dil Ko Pukara" are inspired by the song Voices by Vangelis, with the latter song having that tune playing throughout the song. The film's soundtrack album sold about 8.5 to 10 million units becoming one of its decades best selling Bollywood soundtrack of all time.

== Reception ==
=== Box-office ===
Kaho Naa... Pyaar Hai emerged as a major commercial success and became one of the highest-grossing Bollywood film of 2000s.

=== Critical reception ===
Kaho Naa... Pyaar Hai received generally positive reviews from critics, with particular praise directed at Hrithik Roshan’s debut performance, the film's music, and its production values. However, some reviewers noted that the storyline followed conventional tropes and lacked originality.

Filmfare rated the film 3.5 out of 5 and remarked, "Rakesh Roshan has come up with a winner. A racy script, excellent product values and taut editing result in a storyline that keeps the audience hooked throughout. The music is also good, especially the title song and numbers such as 'Ek Pal Ka Jeena' and 'Chand Sitaare'. Hrithik is very good in the action and dance sequences, and proves his acting calibre in his very first film. Ameesha Patel too performs well."

Sabiha Kalolwala of The Indian Express praised the film saying, "Rakesh Roshan has been smart enough to make a film which encompasses all the facets of acting—drama, action, romance, thrill, comedy and tragedy, all of them enacted pretty well by Hrithik Roshan." On the soundtrack, she noted, "There is not even one song which is not enjoyable."

Anupama Chopra of India Today stated, "Rakesh has taken the routine love-story, added a thriller twist and narrated it with style. KNPH isn't about path-breaking craft, it's about blockbuster presentation. Rakesh's sweat and money are apparent in every frame." However, she criticized the antagonist subplot, writing, "What doesn't work is the tired villain track... The plot is as stale as the performances."

Kanchana Suggu of Rediff.com called the film a "great entertainer" and praised Hrithik Roshan’s performance in dual roles: "The ease and style with which he dances, emotes, fights, makes one forget this is his debut film. He's had to essay two different characters, and he's done justice to both." She further complimented the cinematography, music, and direction.

The plot-twist in the film was later noted as being inspired by the 1986 Kannada film Ratha Sapthami.

== Accolades ==
Award (Note: Awards, festivals and organizations are in alphabetical order.)	Date of ceremony (Note: Date is linked to the article about the awards held that year, wherever possible.)	Category	Recipient(s)	Result	Ref.
Bollywood Movie Awards	28 April 2001	Best Film	Kaho Naa... Pyaar Hai – Rakesh Roshan	Won	
Bollywood Movie Awards	28 April 2001	Best Director	Rakesh Roshan	Won	
Bollywood Movie Awards	28 April 2001	Best Actor	Hrithik Roshan	Won	
Bollywood Movie Awards	28 April 2001	Best Male Debut	Hrithik Roshan	Won	
Bollywood Movie Awards	28 April 2001	Best Female Debut	Ameesha Patel	Nominated	
Bollywood Movie Awards	28 April 2001	Best Music Director	Rajesh Roshan	Won	
Bollywood Movie Awards	28 April 2001	Best Playback Singer - Male	Lucky Ali for "Ek Pal Ka Jeena"	Won	
Bollywood Movie Awards	28 April 2001	Best Playback Singer - Female	Alka Yagnik for "Kaho Naa Pyaar Hai"	Won	
Bollywood Movie Awards	28 April 2001	Best Choreography	Farah Khan for "Ek Pal Ka Jeena"	Nominated	
Bollywood Movie Awards	28 April 2001	Best Costume Designer	Rocky S	Nominated	
Bollywood Movie Awards	28 April 2001	Best Screenplay	Honey Irani, Ravi Kapoor	Nominated	
Filmfare Awards	17 February 2001	Best Film	Kaho Naa... Pyaar Hai – Rakesh Roshan	Won	
Filmfare Awards	17 February 2001	Best Director	Rakesh Roshan	Won	
Filmfare Awards	17 February 2001	Best Actor	Hrithik Roshan	Won	
Filmfare Awards	17 February 2001	Best Male Debut	Hrithik Roshan	Won	
Filmfare Awards	17 February 2001	Best Female Debut	Ameesha Patel	Nominated	
Filmfare Awards	17 February 2001	Best Music Director	Rajesh Roshan	Won	
Filmfare Awards	17 February 2001	Best Lyricist	Ibrahim Ashk for "Na Tum Jano Na Hum"	Nominated	
Filmfare Awards	17 February 2001	Best Male Playback Singer	Lucky Ali for "Ek Pal Ka Jeena"	Nominated	
Filmfare Awards	17 February 2001	Best Male Playback Singer	Lucky Ali for "Na Tum Jano Na Hum"	Won	
Filmfare Awards	17 February 2001	Best Female Playback Singer	Alka Yagnik for "Kaho Naa Pyaar Hai"	Nominated	
Filmfare Awards	17 February 2001	Best Choreography	Farah Khan for "Ek Pal Ka Jeena"	Won	
Filmfare Awards	17 February 2001	Best Screenplay	Honey Irani, Ravi Kapoor	Won	
Filmfare Awards	17 February 2001	Best Editing	Sanjay Verma	Won	
International Indian Film Academy Awards	16 June 2001	Best Film	Kaho Naa... Pyaar Hai – Rakesh Roshan	Won	
International Indian Film Academy Awards	16 June 2001	Best Director	Rakesh Roshan	Won	
International Indian Film Academy Awards	16 June 2001	Best Story	Rakesh Roshan	Nominated	
International Indian Film Academy Awards	16 June 2001	Best Actor	Hrithik Roshan	Won	
International Indian Film Academy Awards	16 June 2001	Best Male Debut (Note: Tied with Abhishek Bachchan for Refugee)	Hrithik Roshan	Won	
International Indian Film Academy Awards	16 June 2001	Best Music Director	Rajesh Roshan	Won	
International Indian Film Academy Awards	16 June 2001	Best Lyricist	Ibrahim Ashk for "Na Tum Jano Na Hum"	Nominated	
International Indian Film Academy Awards	16 June 2001	Best Male Playback Singer	Lucky Ali for "Ek Pal Ka Jeena"	Won	
International Indian Film Academy Awards	16 June 2001	Best Male Playback Singer	Udit Narayan for "Kaho Naa Pyaar Hai"	Nominated	
International Indian Film Academy Awards	16 June 2001	Best Female Playback Singer	Alka Yagnik for "Kaho Naa Pyaar Hai"	Won	
International Indian Film Academy Awards	16 June 2001	Best Choreography	Farah Khan for "Ek Pal Ka Jeena"	Won	
International Indian Film Academy Awards	16 June 2001	Best Editing	Sanjay Verma	Won	
International Indian Film Academy Awards	16 June 2001	Best Song Recording	Satish Gupta	Won	
International Indian Film Academy Awards	18 September 2019	Best Film of 20 Years	Kaho Naa... Pyaar Hai – Rakesh Roshan	Won	
23rd Punjabi Kala Sangam Awards	12 November 2000	Best Film	Kaho Naa... Pyaar Hai – Rakesh Roshan	Won	
23rd Punjabi Kala Sangam Awards	12 November 2000	Best Director	Rakesh Roshan	Won	
23rd Punjabi Kala Sangam Awards	12 November 2000	Best Actor	Hrithik Roshan	Won	
23rd Punjabi Kala Sangam Awards	12 November 2000	Sensational Discovery	Ameesha Patel	Won	
23rd Punjabi Kala Sangam Awards	12 November 2000	Best Music Director	Rajesh Roshan	Won	
23rd Punjabi Kala Sangam Awards	12 November 2000	Best Lyricist	Saawan Kumar Tak	Won	
23rd Punjabi Kala Sangam Awards	12 November 2000	Best Male Playback Singer	Kumar Sanu for "Chand Sitaare"	Won	
Screen Awards	20 January 2001	Best Film	Kaho Naa... Pyaar Hai – Rakesh Roshan	Won	
Screen Awards	20 January 2001	Best Director	Rakesh Roshan	Won	
Screen Awards	20 January 2001	Best Actor	Hrithik Roshan	Won	
Screen Awards	20 January 2001	Most Promising Newcomer – Male	Hrithik Roshan	Won	
Screen Awards	20 January 2001	Most Promising Newcomer – Female	Ameesha Patel	Nominated	
Screen Awards	20 January 2001	Best Music Director	Rajesh Roshan	Won	
Screen Awards	20 January 2001	Best Background Music	Rajesh Roshan	Nominated	
Screen Awards	20 January 2001	Best Lyricist	Ibrahim Ashk for "Na Tum Jano Na Hum"	Nominated	
Screen Awards	20 January 2001	Best Male Playback Singer	Lucky Ali for "Ek Pal Ka Jeena"	Won	
Screen Awards	20 January 2001	Best Female Playback Singer	Alka Yagnik for "Kaho Naa Pyaar Hai"	Nominated	
Screen Awards	20 January 2001	Best Choreography	Farah Khan for "Ek Pal Ka Jeena"	Won	
Screen Awards	20 January 2001	Best Screenplay	Honey Irani, Ravi Kapoor	Won	
Screen Awards	20 January 2001	Best Dialogues	Sagar Sarhadi	Nominated	
Screen Awards	20 January 2001	Best Special Effects	Kaho Naa... Pyaar Hai	Nominated	
Screen Awards	20 January 2001	Best Editing	Sanjay Verma	Won	
Screen Awards	20 January 2001	Best Sound Recording	Jitendra Chaudhary	Nominated	
Zee Cine Awards	3 March 2001	Best Film	Kaho Naa... Pyaar Hai – Rakesh Roshan	Won	
Zee Cine Awards	3 March 2001	Netizen Award Best Film	Kaho Naa... Pyaar Hai – Rakesh Roshan	Won	
Zee Cine Awards	3 March 2001	Best Director	Rakesh Roshan	Won	
Zee Cine Awards	3 March 2001	Best Story	Rakesh Roshan	Won	
Zee Cine Awards	3 March 2001	Best Actor – Male	Hrithik Roshan	Won	
Zee Cine Awards	3 March 2001	Best Male Debut	Hrithik Roshan	Won	
Zee Cine Awards	3 March 2001	Best Female Debut	Ameesha Patel	Won	
Zee Cine Awards	3 March 2001	Best Music Director	Rajesh Roshan	Won	
Zee Cine Awards	3 March 2001	Best Playback Singer – Male	Lucky Ali for "Na Tum Jano Na Hum"	Won	
Zee Cine Awards	3 March 2001	Best Playback Singer – Female	Alka Yagnik for "Kaho Naa Pyaar Hai"	Won	

== In popular culture ==
The Hindi-language musical romantic film, Na Tum Jaano Na Hum (2002) also starring Hrithik alongside Esha Deol and Saif Ali Khan, is named after a song from this film.

The song Ek Pal Ka Jeena hook-step eventually became "the signature step of Hrithik Roshan" over years the while its title song Kaho Naa Pyaar Hai hook-step too became one of the iconic hook-steps of industry and Hrithik's dance steps in Dil Ne Dil Ko Pukara too established him as one of the exceptional dancers in industry along with its other songs too becoming evergreen cult classics.

== See also ==
- List of highest-grossing Bollywood films
