= Suniel Shetty filmography =

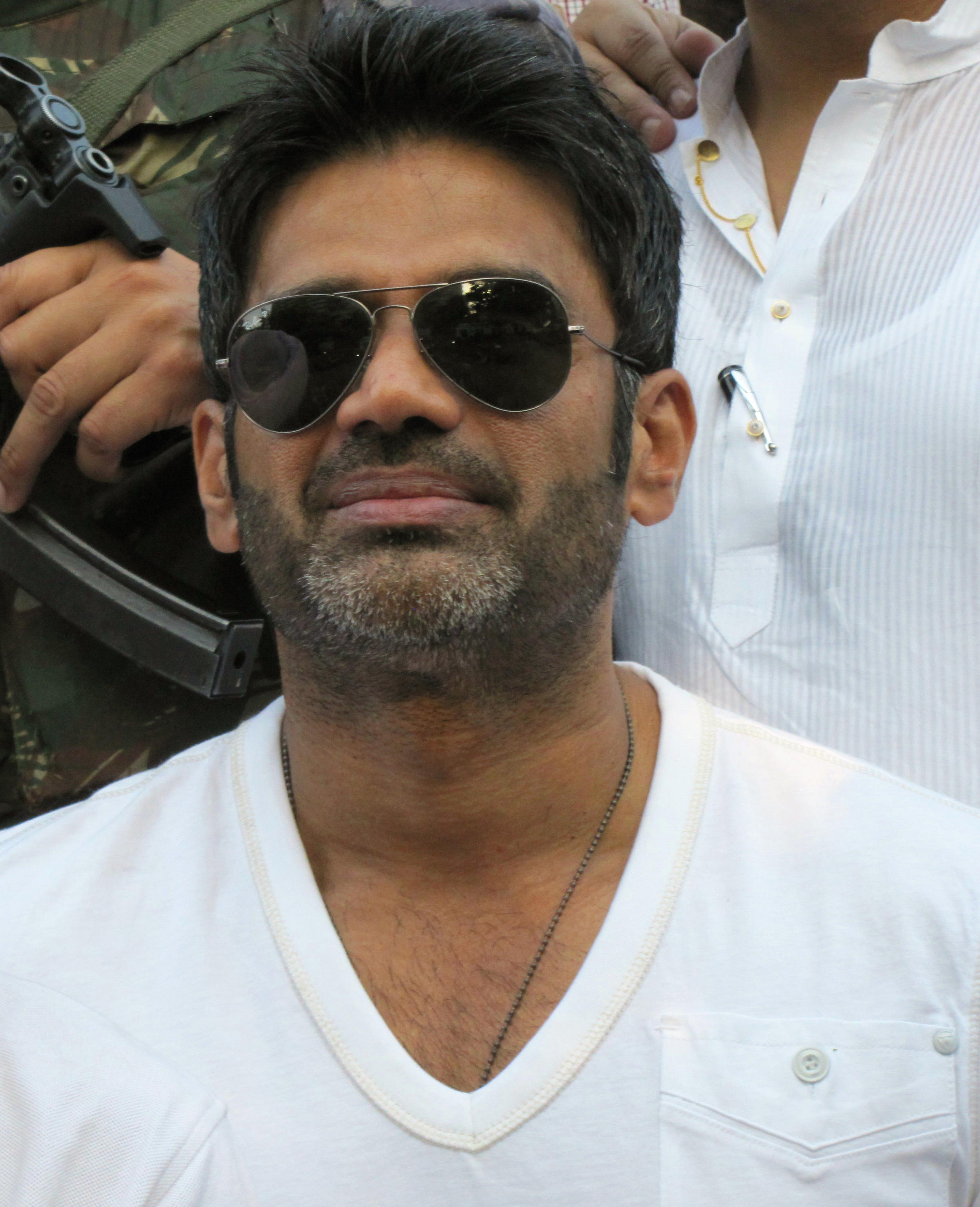
Shetty in 2011

Suniel Shetty (born 11 August 1961) is an Indian actor, film producer, television presenter and producer known for his work in Hindi cinema, in addition to appearing in Malayalam, Tamil, Telugu, Kannada, Tulu and English language films.

== Filmography ==
Key
†	Denotes films that have not yet been released

=== As actor ===
List of Suniel Shetty acting film credits
Year	Title	Role	Note	Ref.
1992	Balwaan	Arjun Singh		
1993	Waqt Hamara Hai	Sunil Choudhary		
1993	Pehchaan	Kunal Verma		
1993	Sweetheart	Himself	short film	
1994	Dilwale	Vikram Singh	Nominated—Filmfare Award for Best Supporting Actor	
1994	Anth	Vijay Saxena		
1994	Mohra	Vishal Agnihotri		
1994	Gopi Kishan	Gopinath "Gopi" / Kishan	Double role	
1994	Hum Hain Bemisaal	Michael		
1995	Surakshaa	Raja		
1995	Raghuveer	Raghuveer Verma		
1995	Gaddaar	Sunil "Sunny" Gujral		
1995	Takkar	Ravi Malhotra		
1996	Ek Tha Raja	Jay		
1996	Vishwasghaat	Avinash Saxena / Sunil Verma		
1996	Krishna	Krishna / Sunil		
1996	Shastra	Vijay		
1996	Sapoot	Raj Singhania		
1996	Rakshak	Raj Sinha		
1997	Border	Bhairav Singh Rathod	Nominated—Filmfare Award for Best Supporting Actor	
1997	Prithvi	Prithvi		
1997	Judge Mujrim	Sunil / Dhaga	Double role	
1997	Bhai	Kundan		
1997	Dhaal	Suraj		
1997	Qahar	Amar		
1998	Vinashak - Destroyer	Arjun Singh		
1998	Aakrosh	Dev Malhotra		
1998	Humse Badhkar Kaun	Bhola / Suraj		
1998	Sar Utha Ke Jiyo	Himself	Guest appearance	
1999	Hu Tu Tu	Aditya		
1999	Bade Dilwala	Ram Prasad		
1999	Kaala Samrajya	Arjun		
2000	Krodh	Karan		
2000	Hera Pheri	Shyam / Ghanshyam		
2000	Refugee	Mohammad Ashraf	Nominated—Filmfare Award for Best Supporting Actor	
2000	Jungle	Shivraj		
2000	Dhadkan	Dev	Won—Filmfare Award for Best Performance in a Negative Role	
2000	Aaghaaz	Govind Narang		
2001	Kuch Khatti Kuch Meethi	Sameer		
2001	Officer	Sagar Chauhan		
2001	Ek Rishtaa	Himself	Guest appearance	
2001	Pyaar Ishq Aur Mohabbat	Yash Sabharwal		
2001	Ittefaq	Shiv "Shiva" Kumar		
2001	Yeh Teraa Ghar Yeh Meraa Ghar	Dayashankar Manoharilal Pandey		
2001	Ehsaas: The Feeling	Ravi		
2002	Awara Paagal Deewana	Yeda Anna		
2002	Jaani Dushman: Ek Anokhi Kahani	Vijay		
2002	Annarth	Jimmy / Jai		
2002	Karz: The Burden of Truth	Raja		
2002	Maseeha	Krishna		
2002	Kaante	Marc Issak		
2002	Chalo Ishq Ladaaye	Himself	Guest appearance	
2003	Baaz: A Bird in Danger	Harshvardhan		
2003	Khanjar: The Knife	Raja		
2003	Qayamat: City Under Threat	Akram Sheikh		
2003	Khel – No Ordinary Game	Dev Mallya	Also Producer	
2003	LOC Kargil	Sanjay Kumar		
2004	Rudraksh	Bhuria		
2004	Main Hoon Na	Raghavan	Nominated—Filmfare Award for Best Performance in a Negative Role	
2004	Lakeer – Forbidden Lines	Sanju		
2004	Aan: Men at Work	Appa Kadam Naik		
2004	Kyun! Ho Gaya Na...	Ishaan		
2004	Rakht	Mohit Jaiswal	Also Producer	
2004	Ek Se Badhkar Ek	Rahul Bhagwat		
2004	Hulchul	Veer		
2005	Page 3	Himself	Guest appearance	
2005	Padmashree Laloo Prasad Yadav	Laloo / Lalchand Dilachand		
2005	Blackmail	Abhay Singh Rathod		
2005	Tango Charlie	Shezad Khan		
2005	Paheli	Sunderlal	Special appearance	
2005	Dus	Danish "Dan"		
2005	Chocolate: Deep Dark Secrets	Rocker		
2005	Kyon Ki	Karan	Special appearance	
2005	Deewane Huye Paagal	Sanju		
2005	Home Delivery	Time Man	Special appearance	
2006	Fight Club – Members Only	Anna		
2006	Shaadi Se Pehle	Anna		
2006	Darna Zaroori Hai	Vishwas Talegaonkar	Story segment: Accidents are Never Predicted	
2006	Chup Chup Ke	Mangal Singh Chauhan		
2006	Phir Hera Pheri	Ghanshyam alias Shyam		
2006	Aap Ki Khatir	Kunal		
2006	Umrao Jaan	Faiz Ali		
2006	Apna Sapna Money Money	Namdev Mane		
2007	Shootout at Lokhandwala	Kaviraj Patil		
2007	Cash	Angad		
2007	Om Shanti Om	Himself	Guest appearance	
2007	Dus Kahaniyaan	Nawab	Anthology film; segment: Rise & Fall	
2007	Welcome	Himself	Guest appearance	
2008	One Two Three	Laxmi Narayan		
2008	Mr. Black Mr. White	Gopi		
2008	Mission Istaanbul	Owais Hussain	Also Producer	
2008	Mukhbiir	Rehman		
2009	Daddy Cool	Steven		
2009	De Dana Dan	Ram Mishra		
2010	Tum Milo Toh Sahi	Amit Nagpal		
2010	Red Alert: The War Within	Narasimha		
2010	Barood (The Fire) A Love Story	Shakti		
2010	No Problem	Marcos		
2011	Thank You	Yogi		
2011	Loot	Builder	Also producer	
2011	Chirayu	Himself	Guest appearance	
2012	Mere Dost Picture Abhi Baki Hai	Amar Joshi		
2012	Delhi Safari	Sultan The Leopard	Voice only Animated film	
2013	Enemmy	Bhau / Eklavya Karmarkar		
2014	Jai Ho	Arjun Kaul	Special appearance	
2014	Koyelaanchal	Nisheeth Kumar		
2014	Desi Kattey	Suryakant Rathore		
2014	The Shaukeens	Himself	Guest appearance	
2015	2 Chehare	Ajay / Babu		
2017	A Gentleman	Vijay Saxena		
2018	Welcome to New York	Himself	Guest appearance	
2019	Khandaani Shafakhana	Himself	Guest appearance	
2021	Mumbai Saga	Sada Anna	Special appearance	
2023	Operation Fryday	Sada Nair	ZEE5 film	
2024	Ruslaan	Shinoy	Special appearance	
2025	Nadaaniyan	Rajat Jaisingh		
2025	Kesari Veer	Vedagji		
2026	Border 2	Bhairav Singh Rathod	Cameo	
2026	Welcome to the Jungle	Yeda Anna		

=== Non-Hindi language films ===
List of Suniel Shetty non-Hindi language film credits
Year	Title	Role	Language	Note
2001	Kakkakuyil	Kunjunni	Malayalam	Special appearance
2001	12B	R. Aravind	Tamil	Special appearance
2006	Kilukkam Kilukilukkam	Mangal Singh Chauhan	Malayalam	Special appearance
2007	Don't Stop Dreaming	Dave	English	
2008	Miras	Arbas	Turkish	
2011	Raada Rox	Himself	Marathi	Special appearance
2013	Kalimannu	Himself	Malayalam	Special appearance
2018	Aa Bb Kk	Bappa	Marathi	Special appearance
2019	Pailwaan	Sarkar	Kannada	
2020	Darbar	Hariharan Chopra	Tamil	
2021	Mosagallu	ACP Aajit Kumar Singh	Telugu	
2021	Marakkar: Lion of the Arabian Sea	Chandroth Panicker	Malayalam	
2022	Ghani	Vijender Sinha	Telugu	
2025	Jai	Himself	Kannada; Tulu	Cameo appearance

=== As producer ===
List of Suniel Shetty film credits as producer
Year	Title
2003	Khel – No Ordinary Game
2004	Rakht
2006	Bhagam Bhag
2008	Mission Istaanbul
2008	EMI
2011	Loot

=== Web series ===
List of Suniel Shetty web series credits
Year	Title	Role	Platform(s)	Ref.
2022	Dharavi Bank	Thalaivan	MX Player	
2023	Hunter Tootega Nahi Todega	ACP Vikram Chauhan	Amazon miniTV	

=== Television ===
List of television credits
Year	Title	Role	Notes
2024	Dance Deewane 4	Judge	
