= Bhai (1997 film) =

1997 film by Deepak Shivdasani

- Theatrical release poster
- Directed by: Deepak Shivdasani
- Written by: Kader Khan
- Based on: Anna by Muthyala Subbaiah
- Produced by: Deepak Shivdasani; Veena Advani; A.K. Abdul
- Starring: Sunil Shetty; Pooja Batra; Sonali Bendre; Kunal Khemu
- Cinematography: Sameer Reddy
- Edited by: V. N. Mayekar
- Music by: Anand–Milind; Sandeep Chowta(background score)
- Production company: Yashish Enterprises
- Distributed by: Goldmines Telefilms
- Release date: 31 October 1997
- Running time: 154 minutes
- Country: India
- Language: Hindi

Bhai (in English "Brother") is a 1997 Indian Hindi-language gangster drama action film directed by Deepak Shivdasani, and written by Kader Khan. It starred Sunil Shetty, Pooja Batra, Sonali Bendre and Ashish Vidyarthi in lead roles.

The film was released on Diwali alongside Shahrukh Khan's Dil To Pagal Hai, and Nana Patekar's Ghulam-E-Mustafa . The movie is a remake of the Telugu movie Anna.

== Plot ==
Tired of enduring assaults by corrupt police officers and criminals in the hilly villages, Kundan (Sunil Shetty) moves to Mumbai with his younger brother, Kisna (Kunal Khemu), with help from honest lawyer Satyaprakash (Om Puri) and his daughters, Pooja (Pooja Batra) and Meenu (Sonali Bendre). Kundan finds work as an auto-rickshaw driver and enrolls Kisna in school, allowing the brothers to build a new life in the city. Meanwhile, rival gangsters Don David (Ashish Vidyarthi) and Malik (Rajendra Gupta) compete for power, while corrupt minister Mantri manipulates both sides for his own benefit.

David's men murder Satyaprakash, and Kisna witnesses the killing. When David learns that Kisna intends to report the crime to the police, he orders his men to kill him. Devastated by his brother's death, Kundan vows revenge and systematically murders David's men. He receives support from honest police inspector Lalit Kapoor (Kader Khan), his friends, including one played by (Shakti Kapoor), and the local community. He rejects Malik's offer of assistance when the rival gangster approaches him.

As Kundan's influence grows, he becomes known as "Bhai," a feared yet respected underworld leader. He marries Pooja, and they have a son named Kisna in memory of his deceased brother. However, Pooja worries that Kundan's criminal activities will endanger him and their family. Meenu, by contrast, actively supports Kundan in his operations. Seeking to weaken Kundan, Mantri arranges for Inspector Lalit to be transferred. David, Malik, and Mantri then join forces to eliminate Kundan.

During one attack, Kundan's friends and Meenu take his young son Kisna to the hospital but are ambushed and killed. Ganesh (Mohan Joshi) manages to save the child and bring him back to Kundan.

Kundan is subsequently arrested on fabricated murder charges. His enemies conspire to transport him to the hills and kill him in the jungles where he began his journey. Kundan escapes from the police jeep, which his captors set on fire, and drives it through a waterfall into a river. As David, Malik, Mantri, and the corrupt police officers search for him, Inspector Lalit arrives as the officer in charge of the area. He helps Kundan by shooting off his handcuffs.

Familiar with the jungle terrain, Kundan fights his pursuers and eliminates them one by one. He also destroys a helicopter carrying Mantri, who attempts to shoot him from above. After defeating his enemies, Kundan surrenders to Lalit.

The film ends with Lalit and Kundan returning home, where a happy reunion awaits them.

== Cast ==
- Suniel Shetty as Kundan
- Sonali Bendre as Meenu Ustad
- Pooja Batra as Pooja
- Om Puri as Advocate Satyaprakash
- Kader Khan as Inspector Lalit Kapoor
- Shakti Kapoor as Bharat (the postman)
- Kunal Khemu as Kisna
- Ashish Vidyarthi as David
- Lalita Pawar as Satyaprakash's mother
- Ishrat Ali as Mantri Lambu Atta
- Rajendra Gupta as Malik
- Mohan Joshi as Ganesh
- Mushtaq Khan as a Principal
- Deepak Shirke as Inspector Khare
- Shiva Rindani as Nepali, Malik's Henchman

== Soundtracks ==
Bhai

Studio album by Anand–Milind
- Released: 1997
- Genre: Feature film soundtrack
- Length: 40 Min
- Label: Bombino Music

Anand-Milind and Sameer teamed up yet again with director Deepak Shivdasani after composing successful songs in films like Pehchaan (1993) and Gopi Kishan (1994).

=== Track Lists ===
| # | Title | Singer(s) |
|---|---|---|
| 1 | "Husn Tumhara" | Udit Narayan, Alka Yagnik |
| 2 | "Katti Batti" | Udit Narayan, Aditya Narayan |
| 3 | "Katti Batti" (Sad) | Udit Narayan |
| 4 | "Mujhe Ekraar" | Abhijeet, Poornima |
| 5 | "Sajna Sajni" | Suresh Wadkar, Sadhana Sargam |
| 6 | "Sajna Sajni" (Sad) | Suresh Wadkar, Sadhana Sargam |
| 7 | "Sare Mohalle Mein" | Vinod Rathod, Sadhana Sargam |
| 8 | "Khul Gaya Naseeb" | Abhijeet, Aditya Narayan, Chandana Dixit |
