= Welcome (film series) =

Indian comedy film series

- Directed by: Anees Bazmee (Welcome, Welcome Back); Ahmed Khan (Welcome to the Jungle)
- Screenplay by: Anees Bazmee; Rajiv Kaul; Praful Parekh; Rajan Aggarwal; Farhad Samji
- Story by: Anees Bazmee; Rajiv Kaul; Neeraj Vora
- Produced by: Firoz Nadiadwala
- Starring: Anil Kapoor; Nana Patekar; Akshay Kumar; Paresh Rawal; Suniel Shetty; John Abraham
- Cinematography: Sanjay Gupta (Welcome); Kabir Lal (Welcome Back, Welcome to the Jungle)
- Edited by: Ashfaque Makrani (Welcome); Stevan Bernard (Welcome Back); Nitin Pathak (Welcome to the Jungle)
- Music by: Anand Raaj Anand; Himesh Reshammiya; Sajid–Wajid; Meet Bros; Anu Malik; Abhishek Ray; Vikram Montrose; Talwiinder; NDS
- Production companies: Base Industries Group; Swiss Entertainment; Cape of Good Films; Seeta Films
- Distributed by: UTV Motion Pictures (Welcome); Eros International (Welcome Back); Star Studio18 (Welcome to the Jungle)
- Release dates: 21 December 2007 (1); 4 September 2015 (2); 26 June 2026 (3)
- Country: India
- Language: Hindi

Welcome is an Indian comedy film series, produced by Firoz Nadiadwala, and directed by Anees Bazmee and Ahmed Khan. The first film Welcome was released on 21 December 2007 and its sequel, Welcome Back was released on 4 September 2015. A third, standalone film, titled Welcome to the Jungle was released on 26 June 2026.

== Overview ==
=== Welcome (2007 film) ===
Uday, a criminal don, decides to find a husband for his kind-hearted sister Sanjana, but he is unsuccessful since no one wants to be associated with a crime family. Dr. Ghunghroo has also been trying to get his nephew, Rajiv, married but due to his condition—the alliance must be with a purely decent family—he is also unsuccessful.

When Rajiv jumps into a burning building to save Sanjana, he is smitten by her. Uday and Majnu, Uday's brother gangster hatch a plan for an alliance with Dr. Ghunghroo. The plan works and Dr. Ghunghroo confirms the alliance, thinking that Uday is a very decent man. But when he is later told that Uday and Majnu are mobsters, he quickly takes his family and flees to Sun City, South Africa to escape. However, Majnu and Sanjana have come to Sun City as well. Rajiv meets Sanjana again and the two fall in love.

Dr. Ghunghroo reconciles with Uday and Majnu and finally agrees to the alliance. Uday and Majnu invite a powerful don of the underworld, RDX to the engagement. At the party, a girl named Ishika arrives, claiming to be Rajiv's childhood betrothed. Ishika is actually the sister-in-law of Dr.Ghunghroo whom Dr. Ghunghroo asked to come and try to break off the engagement. Ishika manages to do so, leaving Rajiv and Sanjana heartbroken. Dr. Ghunghroo reveals that he did this for Rajiv's mother, who had married into a crime family and was harassed and tortured, thus telling Dr. Ghunghroo to raise Rajiv away from crime when he was born. Dr. Ghunghroo decides he will agree to the marriage only if Uday and Majnu give up their life of crime. Rajiv and Sanjana do this by reawakening Uday's love for acting and encouraging Majnu to pursue his love for painting. With these things keeping them busy, Uday and Majnu have no time for crime any more.

Rajiv's actions anger RDX's son, Lucky, who attempts to shoot Rajiv. Sanjana gets hold of the gun and fires a shot that hits Lucky, causing him to go unconscious. RDX is informed of his son's death and comes to attend the cremation. However Lucky, who is still alive, escapes, trying to show his father that he's actually alive. RDX sets the pile of wood on fire, believing he is cremating his son's body. However Lucky, who had been hiding under the wood, jumps out upon realising the wood is on fire, and the truth is revealed to RDX. Rajiv, Ghunghroo, his wife, Ishika, Uday, Majnu and Sanjana are captured by RDX and brought to a cabin set next to a cliff. The frightened group is forced to play Passing the Parcel (Hot Potato) with a globe—but the one who ends up with the globe must jump off the cliff. When Rajiv refuses to pass the globe to Sanjana, Lucky angrily yanks it out of his hands, just as the music stops. Now that his son has the globe, RDX figures the only way he can maintain his image is by killing everyone. Before he can, several government brokers sneak up and cut the footings of the cabin, causing the house to start falling over the cliff, with everyone trapped inside. However, the cabin is suspended by only one column. Hilarious chaos ensues as the group tries to balance the cabin together and keep it from falling off the cliff. Rajiv finds a rope and the group uses it to get back onto stable ground. But to everyone's shock, the floor breaks and Lucky is found hanging on the edge of the cabin. While Rajiv is trying to rescue him, Sanjana reveals the truth to everyone that she was the one who shot Lucky, but Rajiv blamed himself so that Sanjana wouldn't get in trouble. After Rajiv rescues Lucky, the cabin he is standing on falls off into the cliff. Sanjana keeps crying for him thinking he is dead. However, Rajiv survives the event and is reunited with Sanjana and his family. Lucky and RDX are grateful to Rajiv for saving their lives and RDX gives up his life of crime, allowing Rajiv and Sanjana to finally get married.

=== Welcome Back (2015 film) ===
Uday Shetty and Majnu Bhai end a life of crime and become honest businessmen, settling in Dubai. Two conwomen from India, Poonam and Babita (Ankita Shrivastava), present themselves as Maharani Padmavati and Rajkumari Chandini of Najafgarh to con Uday and Majnu of their money. Babita causes the two men to fall in love with her, thus getting them to finance herself and Poonam's luxurious lifestyle. Later, it is revealed that Uday has another sister Ranjana from his father's third marriage and Majnu and Uday are emotionally blackmailed by Uday's father into arranging the marriage of Ranjana and are also forced to do so as Poonam makes that one of her conditions for getting Babita married to either one of them.

The movie then shifts to Dr. Ghunguroo, who has found out that he has a step son from his wife's previous marriage, Ajju a.k.a. Ajay. Ajju is a local goon of Mumbai, where Ranjana studies. Through a chain of hilarious events, they both fall in love with each other. Meanwhile, Majnu and Uday arrange the marriage of Ranjana with the step-son of Doctor Ghunguroo, not knowing that he is a goon. However, at the engagement ceremony, Majnu reveals the truth of Ajju, to which Ajju resists with a fight, threatening to marry Ranjana without any of the brothers' consent.

In order to keep Ajju at bay, Uday and Majnu visit Wanted Bhai, who is an infamous blind don. The brothers are shocked to find that Wanted's son Honey likes Ranjana and would like to marry her. They decide to arrange the marriage of Ranjana to some other decent man, in order to sidestep Ajju as well as Wanted's son. However, due to Ajju and Dr. Ghunguroo, who are in league with Babita and Poonam, they are caught by Wanted Bhai, who summons them to his island.

There, Ajju and Dr. Ghunguroo try to convince Honey that he no longer loves Ranjana and that Babita is his true love. Meanwhile, Uday and Majnu try to kill Ajju, but are frightened at the graveyard in a ghost act planned by Dr. Ghunguroo, Ajju and Ranjana. Unbeknownst to all of them, their activities have been recorded by closed-circuit television, causing Wanted Bhai and Honey to plan to finish them off. However, in a hilarious climax scene, Honey is kidnapped by all of them and they escape towards the desert where they are chased by Wanted Bhai. In the midst of saving himself, Dr. Ghunguroo pushes Wanted Bhai, causing him to faint. Meanwhile, a group of camels heavily march there. Ajju is successful in saving Wanted Bhai from the stampede of camels, and restoring his sight. Wanted Bhai himself, as a form of gratitude, arranges the marriage of Ajju with Ranjana, calling Ajju his 'second son'.

=== Welcome to the Jungle (2026 film) ===
Welcome to the Jungle was originally scheduled for release on Christmas 2024. The announced cast consisted of Akshay Kumar, Suniel Shetty, Paresh Rawal, Johnny Lever, Rajpal Yadav, Arshad Warsi, Tusshar Kapoor, Shreyas Talpade, Aftab Shivdasani, Jackie Shroff, Daler Mehndi, Mika Singh, Raveena Tandon, Lara Dutta, Jacqueline Fernandez, Disha Patani, Urvashi Rautela, Farida Jalal, Krushna Abhishek, Mukesh Tiwari, Yashpal Sharma, Vindu Dara Singh, Kiran Kumar, Zakir Hussain, late Pankaj Dheer, Puneet Issar, Kiku Sharda, Feroze Khan (Arjun), Sudesh Berry, and Vrihi Kodvara.

The first schedule of the shoot was completed in May 2024. As more schedules were planned, and with VFX work in post-production expected, the release date was pushed to 2025. In August 2024, director Ahmed Khan said that 70% of the shoot was complete, and the international shoot schedule in UAE was planned for October.

The film released theatrically on 26 June 2026.

== Cast and characters ==
Character	Film		
Character	Welcome; (2007)	Welcome Back; (2015)	Welcome to the Jungle; (2026)
Sagar "Majnu" Pandey	Anil Kapoor	Anil Kapoor	Anil Kapoor (archive footage)
Uday Shetty	Nana Patekar	Nana Patekar	Nana Patekar (archive footage)
Rajiv Saini	Akshay Kumar	Akshay Kumar (archive footage)	
Rajiv Kohli			Akshay Kumar (Note: Kumar played a dual role.)
Vishwajit Kohli			Akshay Kumar
Dr. Dayal Ghunghroo	Paresh Rawal	Paresh Rawal	
Das			Paresh Rawal
RDX Ranvir Dhanraj Xaka	Feroz Khan	Feroz Khan (archive footage)	
Sanjana Shetty	Katrina Kaif	Katrina Kaif (archive footage)	
Mrs. Payal Ghunghroo	Supriya Karnik	Supriya Karnik	
Baljeet "Ballu" Rawat	Mushtaq Khan	Mushtaq Khan	
Uday Shetty’s lawyer	Adi Irani	Adi Irani	
Uday Shetty’s bodyguard	Harry Josh	Harry Josh	
Majnu's goon	Snehal Dabi	Snehal Dabi	
Rakesh Kapoor / Vikrant Kapoor / Amar Kapoor	Ranjeet	Ranjeet	
Suniel Shetty	Suniel Shetty (Cameo)		
Yeda Anna			Suniel Shetty
Ishika Kanojia	Mallika Sherawat		
Lucky Xaka	Shereveer Vakil		
Purushottam	Paresh Ganatra		
Municipal worker	Charlie		
Pandit Manilal Shastri	Sanjay Mishra		
Dhanesh Varman	Vijay Raaz		
Akhilendra Chandel	Asrani		
Ajay "Ajju" Barsi		John Abraham	
Ranjana Shetty		Shruti Hassan	
Shankar Shetty		Nana Patekar	
Poonam / Maharani Padmavati		Dimple Kapadia	
Babita / Rajkumari Chandini		Ankita Shrivastav	
Mansoor Sharif (Wanted Bhai)		Naseeruddin Shah	
Honey Sharif		Shiney Ahuja	
Baadshah Bhai		Neeraj Vora	
Tailor		Rajpal Yadav	
Dev			Rajpal Yadav
Romeo			Arshad Warsi
Narrator	Om Puri	Vijay Raaz	

Item dancers

Character	Film		
Character	Welcome; (2007)	Welcome Back; (2015)	Welcome to the Jungle; (2026)
Special appearance in songs	Malaika Arora (in "Honth Rasiley")	Radhika Bangia (in "20-20"); Sakshi Maggo (in "20-20"); Lauren Gottlieb (in "20-20"); Reema Debnath (in "20-20"); Shubhi Sharma (in "20-20"); Sambhavna Seth (in "20-20"); Surveen Chawla (in "Tutti Bole Wedding Di"); Snigdha Gupta Mehta (in "Tutti Bole Wedding Di")	Akshara Singh (in Ghis Ghis Ghis)

== Crew ==
Occupation	Film		
Occupation	Welcome (2007)	Welcome Back (2015)	Welcome to the Jungle (2026)
Director	Anees Bazmee	Anees Bazmee	Ahmed Khan
Producer	Firoz Nadiadwala	Firoz Nadiadwala	Firoz Nadiadwala
Screenplay	Anees Bazmee, Rajiv Kaul, Praful Parekh	Anees Bazmee, Rajiv Kaul, Rajan Aggarwal, Praful Parekh	Farhad Samji
Story	Anees Bazmee, Rajiv Kaul	Anees Bazmee, Rajiv Kaul	Neeraj Vora
Cinematography	Sanjay F. Gupta	Kabir Lal	Kabir Lal
Editor	Ashfaque Makrani	Steven Bernard	Nitin Pathak
Composer(s)	Anand Raj Anand, Himesh Reshammiya, Sajid–Wajid	Meet Bros. Anjjan, Anu Malik, Abhishek Ray	Vikram Montrose, Anand Raaj Anand, Talwiinder, NDS, Sajid-Wajid
Background score	Sajid–Wajid	Aadesh Shrivastava	Hanif Shaikh
Production House(s)	Base Industries Group	Base Industries Group, Swiss Entertainment	Base Industries Group, Cape of Good Films, Seeta Films
Distributor(s)	UTV Motion Pictures, Indian Films	Eros International	Star Studio18

== Release and reception ==
Box office

Film	Release date	Budget	Box office revenue
Welcome	21 December 2007	₹32 crore (US$7.74 million)	₹117.91 crore (US$28.52 million)
Welcome Back	4 September 2015	₹48 crore (US$7.48 million)	₹167.37 crore (US$26.09 million)
Welcome to the Jungle	26 June 2026	₹125 crore (US$13 million)	₹177.22 crore (US$18 million)
Total		₹205 crore (US$21 million)	₹462.50 crore (US$48 million)

Critical reception

Film	Rotten Tomatoes
Welcome	N/A (1 reviews)
Welcome Back	40% (4.3/10 average rating) (10 reviews)
Welcome to the Jungle	46% (5.10/10 average rating) (13 reviews)

== See also ==
- Housefull (film series)
- Dhamaal (film series)
- Golmaal (film series)
