= Hype Luxury Mobility =

Indian luxury car rental company

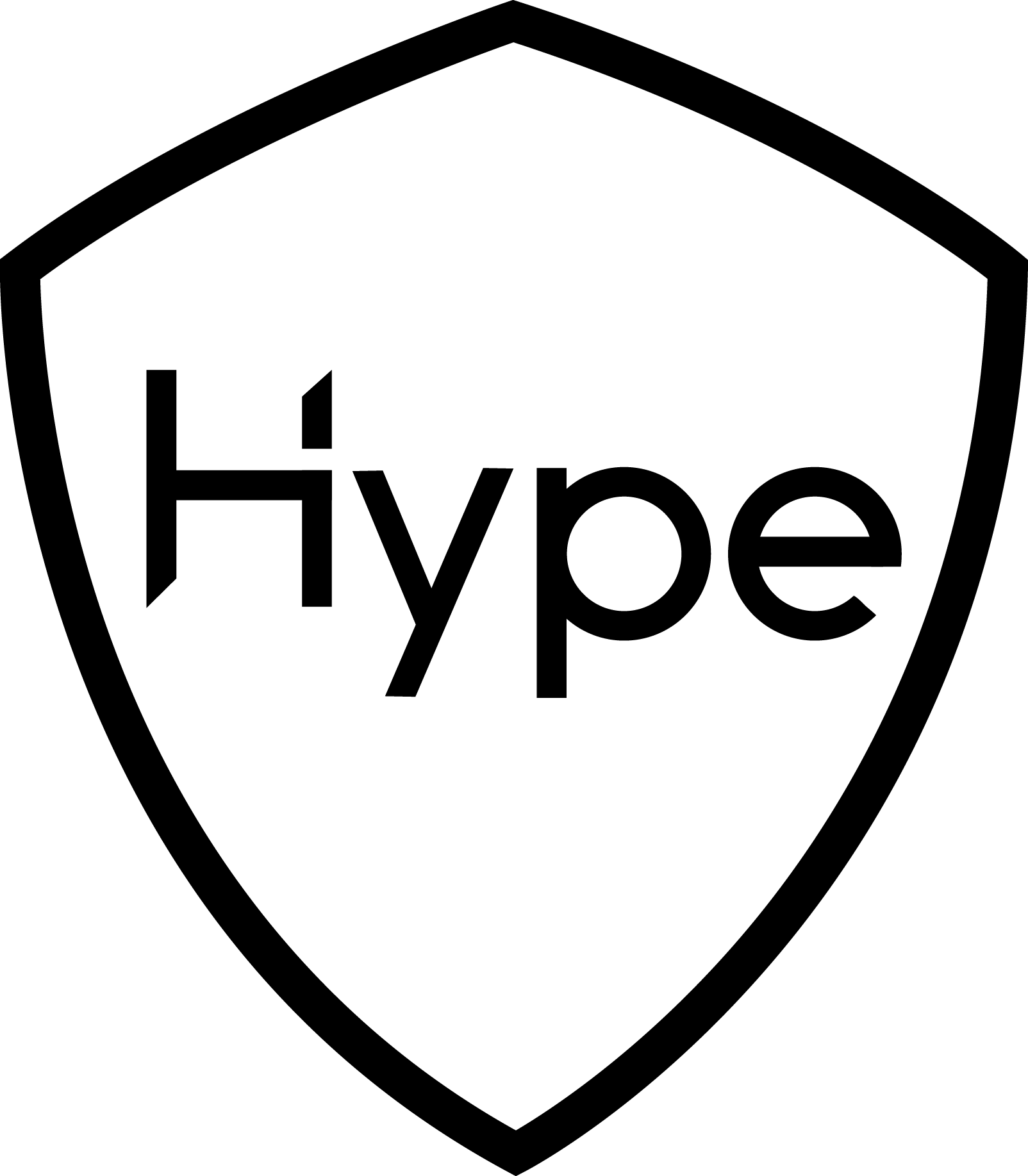
- Type: Private
- Industry: Car rental
- Founded: 2017; 9 years ago
- Founder: Raghav Belavadi
- Headquarters: Bangalore, India
- Areas served: India, UAE, UK
- Services: luxury car rental, yacht rental, private jet rental
- Website: www.hype.luxury

Hype Luxury Mobility is a luxury car rental company headquartered in Bangalore, India. Founded in 2017, it provides luxury cars, yachts, and private jets for rent in India, the UAE, and the UK. The company was founded in 2017 by siblings Raghav Belavadi and Vijaya Belavadi.

== Fleet ==
Hype has operations in 19 cities across India including Ahmedabad, Bangalore, Chandigarh, Chennai, Cochin, Coimbatore, Delhi NCR, Goa, Hyderabad, Indore, Jaipur, Jodhpur, Kolkata, Mangalore, Mumbai, Madurai and, Pondicherry. The brands in its fleet include Rolls-Royce, Mercedes, Lamborghini, Ferrari, Maserati, Jaguar, etc. Users book cars for rent directly from its website or through its mobile app.

It has a fleet of yachts including Bayliner 340, Ferretti 550, Island Spirit 401, Grand Soliel 45, Sea Ray 330, Azimut 39, Rinker 260, Free Spirit, Majesty 66 etc.

It has also partnered with aircraft operators to provide helicopters and private jet rentals.

== Funding ==
Hype Luxury said in a statement it had raised an undisclosed amount in Pre-Series A funding from Razorpay co-founders Harshil Mathur and Shashank Kumar's early stage startup fund MarsShot Ventures.

== Brand Ambassador ==
Suniel Shetty has collaborated with HYPE as the brand ambassador.
