= Welcome (2007 film) =

2007 Indian film by Anees Bazmee

- Theatrical release poster
- Directed by: Anees Bazmee
- Written by: Anees Bazmee; Rajiv Kaul; Praful Parekh
- Produced by: Firoz Nadiadwala
- Starring: Feroz Khan; Anil Kapoor; Nana Patekar; Akshay Kumar; Katrina Kaif; Paresh Rawal; Mallika Sherawat
- Narrated by: Om Puri
- Cinematography: Sanjay F. Gupta
- Edited by: Ashfaque Makrani
- Music by: Songs: Himesh Reshammiya; Anand Raj Anand; Sajid–Wajid; Background Score: Sajid–Wajid
- Production company: Base Industries Group
- Distributed by: UTV Motion Pictures; Indian Films
- Release date: 21 December 2007
- Running time: 158 minutes
- Country: India
- Language: Hindi
- Budget: ₹30 crore
- Box office: ₹117.91 crore

Welcome is a 2007 Indian Hindi-language comedy film co-written and directed by Anees Bazmee. A loose remake of the 1999 American-British comedy Mickey Blue Eyes, it stars Feroz Khan (in his final film role), Anil Kapoor, Nana Patekar, Akshay Kumar, Katrina Kaif, Paresh Rawal, and Mallika Sherawat. Khan's character and dialogues became largely popular among the masses even after his demise. Suniel Shetty made guest appearance.

Made on a budget of ₹320 million (US$3.4 million) which includes making and marketing costs, Welcome was distributed by UTV Motion Pictures. It was theatrically released worldwide on 21 December 2007, coinciding with the Christmas festival. The film received mostly mixed-to-positive reviews from critics with particular praise towards Patekar and Kapoor's performances. Nevertheless, the film emerged as a major commercial success and went on to become the second highest grossing Hindi film of the year with global revenues of ₹1.22 billion (US$13 million). It is considered as a modern cult film.

The film is the first instalment of the Welcome series and spawned a sequel, Welcome Back (2015). A third, unrelated instalment in the series, titled Welcome to the Jungle, released in 2026.

== Plot ==
Dr. Dayal Ghungroo lives with his wife and his son-like nephew Rajiv, an auctioneer who is his late sister's son, whom Ghungroo wants to get married, but Ghungroo will only allow Rajiv to marry a into family that doesn't have a criminal history. Meanwhile, a don, Uday Shetty, wants his half-sister, Sanjana, to get married, but all his attempts fail due to his criminal background, and sometimes, due to the revelation by his lawyer. Rajiv is smitten by her after a chance meeting. Uday and his best friend/foster brother, Sagar Pandey, a.k.a. Majnu Bhai, want their marriage to happen. But after learning that they are mobsters, Ghungroo flees to South Africa with his family. Majnu and Sanjana also arrive there for a holiday. She and Rajiv meet again and fall in love.

Uday and Majnu compel Ghungroo to accept the alliance by emotional blackmail and invite their boss, the powerful underworld Don, Ranvir Dhanraj Xaka, a.k.a. RDX, for their engagement. Ghungroo sends his sister-in-law, Ishika, to break the alliance, who succeeds by falsely claiming to be Rajiv's childhood betrothed at the engagement party. Ghungroo reveals that Rajiv's criminal father harassed and tortured Rajiv's mother, who then requested Ghungroo to keep Rajiv away from crime. Ghungroo says he'll agree to their alliance only if Uday and Majnu give up their lives of crime. Rajiv and Sanjana attempt to do this by reawakening Uday's love for acting and encouraging Majnu's passion for painting. They also plant Ishika to pretend to be in love with both brothers. With these things keeping them busy, Uday and Majnu do not have time for crime anymore.

Rajiv's actions anger Lucky, RDX's son, who attacks Rajiv. Sanjana gets hold of the gun and fires a shot that accidentally hits Lucky, which makes him unconscious. RDX is informed that Lucky has died, and he comes to attend the cremation. However, Lucky, who is still alive, escapes while being followed by Rajiv, Uday, Majnu, and their henchmen while trying to show his father that he's alive, but fails and hides inside the cremation area. RDX sets the pile of wood on fire, believing he is cremating his son's body. However, Lucky, who is hiding under the wood, jumps out upon realizing the wood is on fire, revealing the truth to RDX.

Rajiv, Ghunghroo, his wife, Ishika, Sanjana, Uday, Majnu, their henchmen, and Uday's lawyer are captured by RDX and brought to a cabin set next to a cliff. The frightened group is forced to play pass the parcel with a globe — but the one who ends up with the globe must jump off the cliff, with these rules to be followed strictly and mandatorily. When Rajiv refuses to pass the globe to Sanjana, Lucky angrily yanks it out of his hands, just as the music stops. Now that his son has the globe, RDX, known for always keeping his word and following the rules, figures the only way he can maintain his image is by killing everyone. Before he can, government brokers led by Purushottam sneak up and cut the footings of the illegally built cabin, causing the house to start falling over the cliff, with everyone trapped inside. However, the cabin is suspended by only 1 column.

Hilarious chaos ensues as the group tries to balance the cabin together and keep it from falling off the cliff. Amidst this, Majnu tries to free Lucky's head from a vessel with an axe, during which an angry RDX tries to shoot Majnu but misses, causing the bullet to hit a beehive. And the bees started attacking them all. As the bees sting everyone, Rajiv finds a rope, and the group uses it to get back onto stable ground. But to everyone's shock, the floor breaks, and Lucky is found hanging on the edge of the cabin. While everyone else is bickering and Rajiv is trying to rescue him, Sanjana reveals the truth to everyone: she was the one who shot Lucky, but Rajiv blamed himself so that Sanjana wouldn't get in trouble. After Rajiv rescues Lucky, the cabin he is standing in falls off the cliff, leading everyone to believe that Rajiv died. However, Rajiv survives the event and is reunited with Sanjana and his family. Lucky and RDX are grateful to Rajiv for saving their lives and tell Rajiv to ask for anything that he wishes for. Rajiv requests that they give up crime, and RDX agrees, allowing Rajiv and Sanjana to finally get married. Uday and Majnu request RDX to get them married to Ishika, only to realize that Ishika had fooled them along with Rajiv as a part of his plan to marry Sanjana. This angers Uday and Majnu, who start to chase Rajiv.

== Cast ==
- Feroz Khan as Ranvir Dhanraj Xaka a.k.a. "RDX"
- Anil Kapoor as Sagar "Majnu" Pandey
- Nana Patekar as Don Uday Shetty
- Akshay Kumar as Rajiv Saini
- Katrina Kaif as Sanjana S. Shetty (Hindi voice dubbed as Mona Ghosh Shetty)
- Paresh Rawal as Dr. Dayal Ghungroo
- Mallika Sherawat as Ishika Kanojia
- Sanjay Mishra as Pandit Manilal Shastri
- Asrani as Akhilendra Chandel
- Paresh Ganatra as Purushottam "Pappu" Bhan, municipal officer
- Vijay Raaz as Dhanesh Varman
- Ranjeet as Rakesh Kapoor
- Supriya Karnik as Niharika "Payal" Ghungroo
- Mushtaq Khan as Balwish Dey "Ballu"
- Adi Irani as Advocate Harkesh Sahni
- Snehal Dabi as Kakhil
- Shereveer Vakil as Lucky Ranvir Xaka
- Harry Josh as Uday's henchman
- Swatantra Bharat as Uday's henchman
- Charle as Nandan Singh
- Sharad Sankla as Aadesh Mehta, municipal officer.
- Om Puri as the Narrator (voice only)
- Suniel Shetty as himself (special appearance)
- Malaika Arora as herself in song "Honth Rasiley" (special appearance)

== Soundtrack ==
Welcome

Soundtrack album by Sajid–Wajid, Anand Raj Anand and Himesh Reshammiya
- Released: 1 November 2007 (Digital Release); 21 December 2007 (Film)
- Recorded: 2007
- Genre: Feature film soundtrack
- Language: Hindi
- Label: Junglee Music (Times Group)

Anand Raj Anand chronology
Dus Kahaniyaan (2007)	Welcome (2007)	Jimmy (2008)

Himesh Reshammiya chronology
Nanhe Jaisalmer (2007)	Welcome (2007)	My Name Is Anthony Gonsalves (2008)

The soundtrack was composed by Anand Raj Anand, Himesh Reshammiya and Sajid–Wajid. The lyrics were penned by Anand Raj Anand, Sameer, Shabbir Ahmed, Ibrahim Ashq and Anjaan Sagiri. According to the Indian trade website Box Office India, with around 15,00,000 units sold, this film's soundtrack album was the year's fifth highest-selling.

Welcome track listing
No.	Title	Lyrics	Music	Singer(s)	Length
1.	"Honth Rasiley"	Ibrahim Ashk	Anand Raj Anand	Shankar Mahadevan, Anand Raj Anand, Shreya Ghoshal	4:40
2.	"Insha Allah"	Sameer	Himesh Reshammiya	Krishna Beura, Shaan, Akriti Kakkar	5:38
3.	"Kiya Kiya"	Anjaan Sagiri	Anand Raj Anand	Anand Raj Anand, Shweta Pandit	5:02
4.	"Uncha Lamba Kad"	Anand Raj Anand	Anand Raj Anand	Anand Raj Anand, Kalpana Patowary	4:40
5.	"Welcome"	Shabbir Ahmed	Sajid–Wajid	Shaan, Sowmya Raoh, Wajid	4:18
6.	"Kola Laka Vellari"	Sameer	Himesh Reshammiya	Himesh Reshammiya	5:38

== Reception ==
=== Box office ===
At the box office, Welcome opened to a massive response locally, by grossing ₹35 crore (US$3.7 million) on its opening week. Despite facing competition from the popular Aamir Khan-starrer, Taare Zameen Par which was also a huge success, Welcome grossed ₹97.43 crore (US$10 million) domestically. It became the second highest-grossing film of 2007, just behind Om Shanti Om. The worldwide gross was around ₹117.91 crore (US$13 million).

=== Critical response ===
The film received mostly mixed to positive reviews from critics and praise towards Patekar and Kapoor's gangster characters. Taran Adarsh of Bollywood Hungama gave the film 4 out of 5 stars and stated "Welcome is one of those entertainers that deliver what it promises: Funny sequences, super performances and loads and loads of laughter. Without doubt, it will be welcomed with open arms by the aam junta!". The Times of India gave the film 3 out of 5 stars, and stated "Go for end-of-the-year gags and season-of-goodwill giggles." Hindustan Times stated, "Akshay Kumar has a flair for comedy but even that is beginning to bore which is quiet evident in Welcome." Sukanya Verma of Rediff.com gave the film 3 out of 5 stars and stated "it's the extraordinary camaraderie between the actors, completely consumed by the foolhardiness that surrounds them, that tickles the bone. And hard."

Tajpal Rathore of the BBC gave the film 3 out 5 stars and stated "Comedies should always be taken lightly in Bollywood and Welcome is as zany as they come. And while it emerges as an addition to Kumar's repertoire of films that have little style and even less substance, it is the formidable ensemble cast that ultimately succeed in welcoming you to the theatre hall."

Rajeev Masand gave the film 1 out of 5 stars and stated "Welcome the tortuous comedy." The Hindu's negative review entitled "No, thank you!" concludes saying "Gags to make you smile, some to make you gag".

== Awards and nominations ==
List of awards and nominations received by Welcome
Award	Date of ceremony	Category	Recipients	Result	Ref.
Filmfare Awards	16 February 2008	Best Supporting Actor	Anil Kapoor	Nominated	
Producers Guild Film Awards	8 April 2008	Best Entertainer of the Year	Akshay Kumar	Won (Note: Also won for Namastey London, Heyy Babyy and Bhool Bhulaiyaa)	
Zee Cine Awards	26 April 2008	Best Comedian	Nana Patekar	Nominated	
Zee Cine Awards	26 April 2008	Best Comedian	Anil Kapoor	Nominated	
International Indian Film Academy Awards	8 June 2008	Best Supporting Actor	Anil Kapoor	Nominated	

== Sequel ==
A sequel to the film, titled Welcome Back, has been released. It features John Abraham, Shruti Haasan, Anil Kapoor, Nana Patekar and Paresh Rawal in titular roles. Earlier reported to release on 19 December 2014, the project finally released on 4 September 2015.
