= Deepak Shivdasani =

Indian film director

- Born: Bombay, India
- Occupations: Director, Screenwriter
- Years active: 1982 –
- Website: Official website

Deepak Shivdasani is an Indian film director and producer of Bollywood. He made Ladaai with Aditya Pancholi and Mithun Chakraborty in 1989, Baaghi: A Rebel for Love with Salman Khan in 1990 and Bhai, Gopi Kishan, Krishna and Pehchaan with Sunil Shetty in 1997.

His films have not been successful and many of them were termed as box office 'disasters'. After dismal box office collections of his last film Julie 2 in November 2017, he wrote on social networking site, Facebook “I owe monies to technician & vendors… which I promise to pay in time”.

== Filmography ==
- 1982 – Bezubaan (Asst. dir)
- 1983 – Woh Saat Din (Asst. dir)
- 1985 – Bhavani Junction
- 1987 – Dadagiri
- 1989 – Ladaai
- 1990 – Baaghi: A Rebel for Love
- 1993 – Pehchaan
- 1994 – Madam X
- 1996 – Krishna
- 1997 – Bhai
- 2001 – Yeh Raaste Hain Pyaar Ke
- 2004 – Julie
- 2008 – Mr. Black Mr. White
- 2017 – Julie 2
