= Sameer Reddy =

Indian Hindi and Telugu films cinematographer

- Born: 30 August 1971 (age 55); Hyderabad, Telangana, India
- Occupation: Cinematographer
- Years active: 1990 – present
- Awards: Nandi Award for Shatamanam Bhavathi; SICA- Govindudu Andarivade Le; INDIWOOD Excellence Award for Shamantaka Mani

Sameer Reddy is an Indian film cinematographer who works in Telugu and Hindi films, and Cinema of the United States. He is the cousin and a relative of cinematographers, Rasool Ellore and S. Gopal Reddy, respectively.

== Filmography ==
- All films are in Telugu, unless otherwise noted.

| Year | Film | Language | Notes |
|---|---|---|---|
| 1996 | Krishna | Hindi | Debut |
| 1997 | Bhai | Hindi | |
| 1998 | Nidhi | Telugu | |
| 1999 | Jaanwar | Hindi | |
| 1999 | Hum Tum Pe Marte Hain | Hindi | |
| 2001 | Ek Rishtaa: The Bond of Love | Hindi | |
| 2001 | Anandam | Telugu | |
| 2002 | Kalusukovalani | Telugu | |
| 2002 | Quicksand | English | |
| 2002 | Jayam | Telugu | |
| 2002 | Holi | Telugu | |
| 2002 | Manmadhudu | Telugu | |
| 2003 | Nijam | Telugu | |
| 2003 | Satyam | Telugu | |
| 2004 | Malliswari | Telugu | |
| 2004 | Naa Autograph | Telugu | |
| 2005 | Dhairyam | Telugu | |
| 2005 | Avunanna Kaadanna | Telugu | |
| 2005 | Modati Cinema | Telugu | |
| 2006 | Chukkallo Chandrudu | Telugu | |
| 2006 | Andala Ramudu | Telugu | |
| 2007 | Yogi | Telugu | |
| 2007 | Athidhi | Telugu | |
| 2008 | Kantri | Telugu | |
| 2009 | Josh | Telugu | |
| 2010 | Don Seenu | Telugu | |
| 2011 | Sakthi | Telugu | |
| 2012 | Racha | Telugu | |
| 2013 | Mr. Pellikoduku | Telugu | |
| 2013 | Bhai | Telugu | |
| 2014 | Govindudu Andarivadele | Telugu | |
| 2015 | Pandaga Chesko | Telugu | |
| 2016 | Nenu Sailaja | Telugu | |
| 2016 | Hyper | Telugu | |
| 2017 | Sathamanam Bhavati | Telugu | |
| 2017 | Shamantakamani | Telugu | |
| 2017 | Vunnadhi Okate Zindagi | Telugu | |
| 2017 | Julie 2 | Hindi | |
| 2017 | Middle Class Abbayi | Telugu | |
| 2018 | Lover | Telugu | |
| 2018 | Srinivasa Kalyanam | Telugu | |
| 2019 | F2: Fun and Frustration | Telugu | |
| 2019 | Iddari Lokam Okate | Telugu | |
| 2021 | Red | Telugu | |
| 2022 | Hero | Telugu | |
| 2022 | Butterfly | Telugu | |
| 2023 | Ahimsa | Telugu | |
| 2025 | Sankranthiki Vasthunam | Telugu | |
| 2025 | Thammudu | Telugu | |
| 2026 | Mana Shankara Vara Prasad Garu | Telugu | |
| 2027 | January 12 Vidudala † | Telugu | |

=== Television ===
| Year | Title | Network | Notes |
|---|---|---|---|
| 2015 | Baha Kilikki | | Private Song |
| 2023 | Nijam With Smita | SonyLIV | Only title song |
| 2025 | Arabia Kadali | Amazon Prime Video | |
