= Dadagiri (film) =

Indian Hindi film

- Promotional poster
- Directed by: Deepak Shivdasani
- Produced by: Deepak Shivdasani
- Starring: Dharmendra; Padmini Kolhapure; Govinda
- Cinematography: Lawrence D'Souza
- Music by: Anu Malik
- Release date: 30 January 1987
- Country: India
- Language: Hindi

Dadagiri (transl. Hooliganism) is a 1987 Bollywood action film directed by Deepak Shivdasani, starring Dharmendra, Govinda, Amrish Puri and Padmini Kolhapure. Dadagiri was successful movie of 1987 and this is the first movie where Dharmendra and Govinda performed together.

== Plot ==
Dharma helps an innocent young woman (his daughter) to retrieve her rightful property from her greedy uncle.

== Cast ==
- Dharmendra as Dharma; Deep's husband; Barkha's father
- Govinda as Suraj
- Padmini Kolhapure as Barkha Singh
- Rati Agnihotri as Deepa Singh
- Amrish Puri as Bhanupratap Singh
- Shashikala as Shanti Singh
- Rakesh Bedi as Roshan Singh
- Sudhir Dalvi as Lawyer Saxena
- Manik Irani as Raja Kaalia
- Shiva Rindani as Vicky, Roshan Friend
- Viju Khote as Lakhanpal
- Anup Jalota as Singing Fakeer
- Pooja Ghai Rawal as Adolscent Barkha
- Asha Patel as Chandni Singh

== Music ==
Lyrics: Hasrat Jaipuri.

1. "Aasman Se Zamin Pe Utara Hame Duniya Wale Zindgi" - Anup Jalota
2. "Jo Muskurahat Mujhe De Rahi Ho Wo Muskurahat" - Munmi Borah, Anu Malik
3. "Pataya Pataya Ek Ladki Ko Maine Pataya" - Shabbir Kumar
4. "Sirf Khiladee Badal Gaya" - Anuradha Paudwal
5. "Gudiya Rani Hai Tu" - Anuradha Paudwal, Munmi Borah
6. "Maa Meri Tu Kyon Mujhse" - Munmi Borah
7. "Sirf Khilaadi Badal Gayaa Baaki Khel Puraanaa Hai" - Anuradha Paudwal
