= Ladaai =

1989 film by Deepak Shivdasani

- Promotional poster
- Directed by: Deepak Shivdasani
- Written by: Anwar Khan (dialogues)
- Screenplay by: K. B. Pathak
- Story by: Deepak Shivdasani
- Produced by: Deepak Shivdasani
- Starring: Mithun Chakraborty; Rekha; Dimple Kapadia; Mandakini; Aditya Pancholi; Gulshan Grover; Shakti Kapoor; Anupam Kher; Archana Puran Singh
- Cinematography: Thomas A. Xavier
- Edited by: Waman Bhonsle, Gurudutt Shirali
- Music by: Anu Malik
- Production company: Yashish Enterprises
- Release date: 3 November 1989 (India)
- Running time: 135 minutes
- Country: India
- Language: Hindi

Ladaai (transl. Struggle) is a 1989 Indian Hindi-language action film directed by Deepak Shivdasani, starring Mithun Chakraborty, Rekha, Aditya Pancholi, Dimple Kapadia, Mandakini, Gulshan Grover, Anupam Kher and Rohini Hattangadi in lead roles. The film was released on 3 November 1989 under the banner of Yashish Enterprises.

== Plot ==
Dindayal lives a poor lifestyle in Bombay along with his wife, Shanti, and is employed with Dinanath. One day while at a reception, Dinanath's associate, Sunderdas, gets killed. Before dying he accuses Dindayal of killing him, as a result Dindayal is arrested, prosecuted in Court by Shakuntala Devi, found guilty, and sentenced to prison for life. Shanti gives birth to two sons, but loses her mental capabilities and is institutionalized. 18 years later Dindayal gets discharged, he takes a gun, locates Shakuntala, who has recently been appointed Judge, and confronts her. He then kills himself, but before dying asks Shakuntala to avenge his death by locating the real killer(s). Shakuntala hides his death from everyone, finds out that Dindayal has a look alike son, Shera, and recruits him to track down three possible suspects, namely Radheshyam Pundit, Nissar Khan, and Peter. Shera agrees to do so for a fee, but he is attacked by the trio, decides not to have to do anything with this matter and even states that he is not Dindayal's son, and neither is his mother's name Shanti, but Durga Devi. Neither Shakuntala nor Shera know that the person who masterminded Sunderdas' death is not amongst the trio, and that this person will soon enter their lives - shattering their peace and changing their lives forever.

== Cast ==
- Mithun Chakraborty as Dindayal Sharma/ Shera D. Sharma (Dual role)
- Aditya Pancholi as Amar D. Sharma
- Rekha as Public Prosecutor Shakuntala Verma
- Dimple Kapadia as Billoo
- Mandakini as Geeta Verma
- Gulshan Grover as Peter
- Satish Shah as Radheshyam Pundit
- Anupam Kher as Dinanath/ D. D. N./ Deendayal Sharma
- Archana Puran Singh as Shashi Verma
- Rohini Hattangadi as Shanti D. Sharma
- Deep Dhillon as Robert
- Amrit Pal as Nissar Khan
- Renu Joshi as Durga Devi
- Raj Tilak as Sunder Das

== Music ==
Track#	Title	Singer(s)
1	"Mera Naam Billo Billo"	Alisha Chinai
2	"Ek Bhai Ser Ek Bhai Sava Ser"	Vijay Benedict, Mohammed Aziz
3	"Love Love Love"	Alisha Chinai
4	"Tu Mera Boyfriend"	Alka Yagnik, Anu Malik
5	"Har Mard Ki Teen Kamjori"	Alisha Chinai
