= Bhavani Junction =

1985 film

- Directed by: H. Dinesh
- Written by: Jainendra Jain
- Produced by: Deepak Shivdasani
- Starring: Shashi Kapoor; Shatrughan Sinha; Zeenat Aman; Rati Agnihotri
- Cinematography: Lawrence D'Souza
- Edited by: Govind Dalwadi
- Music by: Bappi Lahiri
- Release date: 22 November 1985
- Running time: 128 min
- Country: India
- Language: Hindi

Bhavani Junction is a 1985 Indian Bollywood crime drama film directed by H. Dinesh and produced by Deepak Shivdasani. It stars Shashi Kapoor, Shatrughan Sinha, Zeenat Aman, Rati Agnihotri in pivotal roles. The film was released on 22 November 1985.

== Plot ==
Police officer Ram is searching for the criminal who rapes and kills his wife. Ram's friend, Bhavani helps him to find out the culprits. Things turn worse when Ram realises that the offender is none other than Rakesh, Bhavani's son.

== Cast ==
- Shashi Kapoor as Raja Bhavani Pratap
- Shatrughan Sinha as SP Ram
- Zeenat Aman as Reshma
- Rati Agnihotri as Shakuntala
- Prem Chopra as Diwanchand
- Deven Verma as Joseph
- Sharat Saxena as Police Chief
- Mazhar Khan as Rakesh "Ricky"
- Mahesh Anand as Kundan

== Songs ==
Song	Singer
"Aaiye Baahon Mein"	Sharon Prabhakar
"Bhavani Junction, Bhavani Junction"	Sharon Prabhakar, Shailendra Singh
"Ghumke Dekho Na Ji"	Asha Bhosle
"Prem Aashram"	Asha Bhosle
