= Julie 2 =

2017 film by Deepak Shivdasani

- Theatrical release poster
- Directed by: Deepak Shivdasani
- Written by: Faheem Chaudhry (Dialogue)
- Screenplay by: Deepak Shivdasani
- Story by: Deepak Shivdasani
- Produced by: Vijay Nair; Deepak Shivdasani; Pahlaj Nihalani
- Starring: Raai Laxmi
- Cinematography: Sameer Reddy
- Edited by: Asif Ali Sheik
- Music by: Viju Shah; Rooh Band; Atif Ali; Javed-Mohsin
- Production company: Triumph Talkies
- Distributed by: Vishal Distributor's
- Release date: 24 November 2017
- Running time: 159 minutes
- Country: India
- Language: Hindi

Julie 2 is a 2017 Indian Hindi-language erotic thriller film written, co-produced and directed by Deepak Shivdasani and produced by Vijay Nair. It features Raai Laxmi which marks her debut in Hindi cinema. This is the sequel to Shivdasani's earlier film Julie (2004).

Viju Shah composes the film's score and soundtrack while Sameer Reddy handles the cinematography. Principal photography commenced in September 2015. Filming locations include Mumbai, Hyderabad and Dubai. The film's first look poster was released on 14 February 2016 coinciding with Valentine's Day.

The film was released on 24 November 2017. The film collected a meagre rupees 2.25 crores net and was termed as a box office 'disaster'.

== Plot ==
A wanna-be actress Julie (Raai Laxmi) struggles through sleazy innuendos before caving in and getting embroiled in the shadowy world that purportedly finances the film industry. Her first love, film director Mohit, abandons her at the first sign of trouble while her second, actor Ravi Kumar (Ravi Kishan), uses her and moves on to his next conquest. The third one is Dubai Don Lala (Dev Gill) and her fourth, Vikram (Sahil Salathia), a cricketer, who thinks she won't suit the "sati savitri" image his parents expect of his bride. So that leaves Julie in a huddle and egged on by her woman Friday, Annie (Rati Agnihotri). She chooses Jesus – only to be gunned down the day after her symbolic baptism at the jewellery shop.

The rest of the film has a ferocious looking ACP Dev Dutt (Aditya Srivastava) trying to arrive at a decent enough reason for her murder. Of course, the power broker, Ashwin Asthana, with CM aspirations and a dead wife, Sumitra Devi, who looks like Julie's doppelgänger, may have something to do with it.

== Cast ==
- Raai Laxmi as Julie / Sumitra Devi
- Nishikant Kamat as Film Director Mohit
- Dev Gill as Don Lala
- Ravi Kishan as Ravi Kumar
- Sahil Salathia as Vikram, a cricketer
- Asad Raza Khan as Ambani
- Aditya Srivastava as ACP Dev Dutt
- Pankaj Tripathy as Ashwin Asthana, would be Chief Minister
- Rati Agnihotri as Annie Aunty
- Yuri Suri as Julie's father

== Production ==
Initially Paoli Dam was approached for the titular role after her success in Hate Story but she refused as she did not want to be stereotype. In July 2015, Raai Laxmi was signed by Deepak Shivdasani for the sequel to his film Julie (2004). It was her first Hindi film, and 50th film as an actress.

== Release and Marketing ==
The first look was released on 14 February 2016. In mid October 2016 Raai Laxmi in an interview said that the film will be released in Hindi, Telugu, Tamil languages .

== Soundtrack ==
Julie 2

Soundtrack album by Viju Shah, Rooh Band, Atif Ali and Javed Mohsin
- Released: 10 November 2017
- Genre: Feature film Soundtrack
- Length: 23:08
- Language: Hindi
- Label: Triumph Talkies

Track listing
No.	Title	Lyrics	Music	Singer(s)	Length
1.	"Mala Seenha"	Shabbir Ahmed	Javed Mohsin	Mamta Sharma, Shabab Sabri, & Danish Sabri	4:45
2.	"Oh Julie"	Sameer	Atif Ali, Rooh (Band)	Anupam Nair	4:11
3.	"Kabhi Jhoota Lagta Hai"	Sameer	Atif Ali, Rooh (Band)	Mistu Bardhan	5:45
4.	"Kharama Kharama"	Sameer	Viju Shah	Pavni Pandey	4:47
5.	"Koi Hausla Toh Hoh"	Sameer	Atif Ali, Rooh (Band)	Anupam Nair	4:20
Total length:					23:08
