= Julie (2004 film) =

2004 film by Deepak Shivdasani

- Theatrical release poster
- Directed by: Deepak Shivdasani
- Written by: Nishikant Kamat (screenplay); Sanjay Pawar (dialogue)
- Produced by: Jay Agarwal; N.R. Pachisia
- Starring: Neha Dhupia; Priyanshu Chatterjee; Yash Tonk
- Cinematography: Thomas A. Xavier
- Edited by: Steven Bernard
- Music by: Score: Naresh Sharma; Songs: Himesh Reshammiya
- Release date: 23 July 2004
- Country: India
- Language: Hindi

Julie is an Indian Hindi erotic film produced by N. R. Pachisia and directed by Deepak Shivdasani. The film stars Neha Dhupia, Priyanshu Chatterjee, Yash Tonk, Sanjay Kapoor and Achint Kaur.

Its sequel, Julie 2, starring Raai Laxmi, also directed by Deepak Shivdasani was released on 24 November 2017, after legal issues.

== Plot ==
The story begins with Tara Agarwal, a renowned news anchor, interviewing a woman who claims a prominent businessman wants to marry her. Though initially sceptical, Tara listens as the woman, Julie, recounts her tragic past.

Julie was once a simple girl from Goa who worked in her father’s bakery. She was deeply in love with Neil, an ambitious man who craved wealth. While Julie was content with a modest life, Neil’s greed led him to abandon her. He leveraged a business deal to marry the daughter of a wealthy tycoon, Braganza, leaving Julie heartbroken. Seeking a fresh start, Julie moved to Mumbai with the help of her friend, Dinky.

In Mumbai, Julie found work as a personal assistant to a builder named Shah. She eventually fell for Rohan, a design consultant. However, the romance was a sham. Rohan was using Julie to secure a massive contract from a perverted businessman named Wadhwa. When Julie escaped Wadhwa’s advances and turned to Rohan for support, he coldly admitted that he had "traded" her for the contract. Devastated by the realisation that men only viewed her as a commodity, Julie met a pimp named Delnaaz and made the radical choice to enter the sex trade.

Back in the present, Julie reveals her identity to Tara, who is moved by the story and agrees to air the interview with dignity. During her time as a prostitute, Julie encounters a kind businessman named Mihir Shandilya. Unlike other men, Mihir is genuinely captivated by her spirit and pursues a sincere friendship. Julie also crosses paths with her ex, Neil, shaming him for his role in her downfall and leaving him consumed by guilt. Meanwhile, Mihir’s love for Julie grows, and he introduces her to his welcoming parents. Despite her feelings for him, Julie fears that her past will tarnish Mihir’s reputation.

To protect Mihir, Julie decides to publicly confess her profession on national television. During the live interview, she speaks of the deception she faced and the harsh realities of her life. In a climactic moment, Mihir intervenes on air. He delivers a powerful speech, blaming society, specifically men, for the creation of the sex trade. He praises Julie’s courage and proposes to her on live television. Supported by his family, Mihir offers Julie the "fresh start" she never thought possible. The film concludes with their marriage, while the men who wronged her, Neil and Rohan, are left to face their own regret and ruin.

== Cast ==
- Neha Dhupia as Julie
- Priyanshu Chatterjee as Mihir Shandilya
- Yash Tonk as Neil
- Sanjay Kapoor as Rohan
- Achint Kaur as Tara Aggarwal
- Sudhir Joshi as Julie's father
- Kiran Kumar as Wadhwa
- Manish Khanna as Naidu (CEO of C TV)
- Anil Nagrath as Vishal (Editor-in-Chief of D Network)
- Brij Gopal as Mr. Malhotra
- Donny Bharadwaj as Sonia Shandilya, Mihir's sister
- Master Vishal Gulati as Sunny Shandilya
- Ahmed Khan as Builder Shah
- Ishwar Patel as Mihir's Uncle
- Kamini Khanna as Delnaaz
- Rishikesh Sharma as Rishi Nair

== Soundtrack ==
Julie

Soundtrack album by Himesh Reshammiya
- Released: 16 June 2004 (India)
- Recorded: 2004
- Venue: Mumbai
- Genre: Feature film soundtrack
- Producer: Himesh Reshammiya

Himesh Reshammiya chronology
Run (2004)	Julie (2004)	Taarzan: The Wonder Car (2004)

All songs composed by Himesh Reshammiya and written by Sameer.

#	Title	Singer (s)
1	"Hum Tumse Dil"	Udit Narayan, Anuradha Paudwal
2	"Dhadkan Ho Gayee"	Alka Yagnik, Udit Narayan
3	"Aye Dil Bata"	Sonu Nigam, Alka Yagnik
4	"Julie"	Sonu Nigam, Jayesh Gandhi
5	"Bheegi Bheegi"	Alka Yagnik
6	"Ishq Tezaab"	Sunidhi Chauhan, Jayesh Gandhi

== Reception and legacy ==
In a contemporary review for Bollywood Hungama, Taran Adarsh gave the film two stars out of five, criticizing various inconsistencies in the plot.

Shortly before the release of Julie 2 in 2017, Devarsi Ghosh of Scroll.in stated "In retrospect, Julie was one of the better erotic Hindi films of the 2000s" and claimed that it, along with Jism and Murder, influenced several later erotic thrillers such as the Hate Story series.
