= Madam X (1994 film) =

- Poster
- Directed by: Deepak Shivdasani
- Screenplay by: Nusrat Sayyed
- Story by: K.B. Patel
- Produced by: Thakur R.S.
- Starring: Rekha; Mohsin Khan; Shakti Kapoor; Raza Murad
- Cinematography: Thomas A. Xavier
- Edited by: A. Muthu
- Music by: Anu Malik; Lyrics: Hasrat Jaipuri, Indivar, Sameer
- Production company: Nishita Productions
- Release date: 25 February 1994
- Running time: 119 min
- Country: India
- Language: Hindi

Madam X is a 1994 Indian Hindi-language Exploitation film directed by Deepak Shivdasani and featuring Rekha, Mohsin Khan, Shakti Kapoor and Raza Murad in important roles. It is Mockbuster of Don (1978)

== Plot ==
Police Officer Vijay captures a lady don, Madam X, and sends her into secret custody. He wants to gather the whereabouts of Madam X's gang. He approaches Sonu, a poor girl who looks like Madam X to enter the criminal gang so that she can provide him information about their activities. Things take a turn for the worse when Madam X escapes from custody.

== Cast ==
- Rekha as Sonu / Madam X (Double Role)
- Mohsin Khan as Inspector Vijay
- Shakti Kapoor as Champaklal
- Raza Murad as Rai Bahadur
- Avtar Gill as Inspector Rana Deshpande
- Parikshit Sahni as Police Commissioner Mathur
- Jagdeep as Jhankar
- Kiran Juneja as Neeta

== Songs ==
Music: Anu Malik, Lyrics: Hasrat Jaipuri, Indivar, Sameer.

1. "Madam X Madam X" – Alisha Chinai
2. "Main Hoon Chhuri Rampuri" – Kavita Krishnamurthy
3. "Shaadishuda Mardon Ko" – Alka Yagnik
4. "Kaise Dil Jeete Aap Ka" – Alka Yagnik
5. "Kaise Dil Jeete Aap Ka" – Anu Malik
