= Welcome to the Jungle (2026 film) =

2026 Indian film by Ahmed Khan

- Theatrical release poster
- Directed by: Ahmed Khan
- Story by: Neeraj Vora
- Dialogues by: Farhad Samji
- Produced by: Firoz Nadiadwala; Rakesh Dang; Vedant Vikaas Baali
- Starring: Akshay Kumar; Suniel Shetty; Paresh Rawal
- Cinematography: Kabir Lal
- Edited by: Nitin Pathak
- Music by: Songs: Vikram Montrose; Anand Raaj Anand; Talwiinder; NDS; Sajid-Wajid; Score: Hanif Shaikh
- Production companies: Star Studio18; Base Industries Group; Cape of Good Films; Seeta Films
- Distributed by: Star Studio18
- Release date: 26 June 2026
- Running time: 164 minutes
- Country: India
- Language: Hindi
- Budget: ₹125 crore
- Box office: ₹186.84 crore

Welcome to the Jungle is a 2026 Indian Hindi-language action adventure comedy film directed by Ahmed Khan, written by Neeraj Vora, and produced by Firoz Nadiadwala, Rakesh Dang, and Vedant Vikaas Baali under Base Industries Group, Cape of Good Films, and Seeta Films. The film stars an ensemble cast of Akshay Kumar, Suniel Shetty, Jackie Shroff, Paresh Rawal, Arshad Warsi, Raveena Tandon, Jacqueline Fernandez, Disha Patani, Johnny Lever, Rajpal Yadav, Farida Jalal, Lara Dutta, Tusshar Kapoor, Shreyas Talpade, Aftab Shivdasani, Yashpal Sharma (actor), and Akshara Singh cameo as a Bhojpuri actress. It is the third installment in the Welcome film series, succeeding Welcome (2007) and Welcome Back (2015). It is loosely based on the 2005 American film The Producers as well as the 2008 American film Tropic Thunder. Principal photography took place in Mumbai and the United Arab Emirates.

Welcome to the Jungle was released worldwide on 26 June 2026. The film received mixed reviews from critics and was a commercial success. It is the 9th highest-grossing Hindi film of 2026.

== Plot ==
Welcome to the Jungle follows Sinha, a wealthy businessman who seeks to avoid paying taxes by creating a ₹2,000 crore film that is deliberately designed to fail. His secretary, Dubey, suggests producing a high-budget movie featuring an unsuccessful actor and an inexperienced director duo.

Sinha agrees to the plan, and Dubey assembles a large cast and crew. Rajiv Kohli is selected as the lead actor, while Dev and Das are appointed as directors. Rajiv's former lover, Nadia, is also brought into the project. However, two underworld figures, Yeda Anna Shetty and Romeo, pressure the directors into giving them prominent roles in the film.

The film's story follows an Indian military mission to rescue a village. During filming, the production encounters numerous accidents, misunderstandings, and unexpected expenses. The project quickly exceeds its budget, creating difficulties for Sinha's plan.

Meanwhile, an income-tax raid leaves Sinha without the money needed to continue production. Desperate to complete the film, he orders Dubey to finish the remaining work within a single day. However, a costly set has already been destroyed without any usable footage being recorded.

The action director, Dominic, suggests moving production to a nearby village that resembles the original set. He warns the crew that the region is threatened by terrorists, but the filmmakers decide to proceed.

When the crew arrives, the villagers mistake the actors for real Indian soldiers who have come to rescue them. At the same time, the filmmakers misunderstand the villagers' fear and reactions, believing that everything is part of the film's production.

As the real danger increases, the fictional military mission turns into an actual struggle for survival. The crew becomes involved in a series of chaotic situations involving criminals, terrorists, and the villagers, forcing the unlikely heroes to confront a crisis beyond the film set.

== Cast ==
- Akshay Kumar in a dual role as
  - Rajiv Kohli
  - Gen. Vishwajit Kohli
- Suniel Shetty as Yeda Anna Shetty
- Paresh Rawal as Das
- Jackie Shroff as Zatara
- Arshad Warsi as Romeo
- Raveena Tandon as Zoya
- Disha Patani as Nadia Daruwala
- Jacqueline Fernandez as Jenny Sinha
- Lara Dutta as Ustad Tejaswini (Teja)
- Farida Jalal as Badi Bi
- Johnny Lever as Dubey
- Shreyas Talpade as Nainsukh
- Tusshar Kapoor as Benny
- Rajpal Yadav as Dev
- Krushna Abhishek as Rambo
- Kiku Sharda as Jumbo
- Daler Mehndi as himself
- Aftab Shivdasani as Abdullah
- Mukesh Tiwari as Rangwa
- Yashpal Sharma as Jagwa
- Kiran Kumar as Murad Chacha
- Zakir Hussain as Sinha, Jenny's father
- Vindu Dara Singh as Ghoni
- Hemant Pandey as Kishan
- Brijendra Kala as Ramprasad Udayvar
- Jeetu Verma as Dominic
- Rushad Rana as Zoya's husband
- Nawab Shah as Zatara's righthand lieutenant
- Vrihi Kodvara as Urvi, Zoya's daughter
- Adityaa Singgh as Hussain
- Bhagya Bhanushali as Bhagya
- Akshara Singh as item number in the song "Ghis Ghis Ghis"

=== Guest Appearance ===
- Urvashi Rautela as Dia
- Firoz Khan as Arjuna
- Pankaj Dheer as Karna
- Puneet Issar as Duryodhana
- Sudesh Berry as Vikrant Singh
- Nana Patekar as Don Uday Shetty (archival footage only)
- Anil Kapoor as Sagar "Majnu" Pandey (archival footage only)

== Production ==
Principal photography began in December 2023. The film was shot primarily in Mumbai, where a 10-acre jungle set was constructed and a replica of a Kashmiri town was constructed at Film City, Goregaon [10]. Filming also took place in the United Arab Emirates, across Abu Dhabi, Dubai, and Ras Al Khaimah, where two romantic songs were filmed. In June 2025, the film got delayed due to financial crises. Later in November 2025, the film's shoot resumes with the shooting of a song sequence. Principal photography was completed in December 2025.

== Music ==
Welcome to the Jungle

Soundtrack album by Vikram Montrose, Anand Raaj Anand, Talwiinder, NDS and Sajid-Wajid
- Released: 24 June 2026
- Genre: Feature film soundtrack
- Length: 35:10
- Language: Hindi
- Label: Times Music
External audio
- Official Audio Jukebox on YouTube

The title track "Welcome to the Jungle" was released on 18 May 2026. The second single "Ghis Ghis Ghis" was released on 25 May 2026. The third song, "Ucha Lamba Kad Forever," was a recreated version of "Uncha Lamba Kad" from the first film and was released on 1 June 2026. The fourth single "Deewane Hain" was released on 18 June 2026. The fifth single "Tera Paisa Mera Paisa" was released on 23 June 2026.

The song "Kaanta Laga," sung by Lata Mangeshkar and composed by R. D. Burman from the film Samadhi (1972) and its 2002 remix by DJ Doll, is featured in a sequence with Disha Patani, Jacqueline Fernandez, and Farida Jalal.

Track listing
No.	Title	Lyrics	Music	Singer(s)	Length
1.	"Welcome to the Jungle - Title Track"	Meggha Bali	Vikram Montrose	Shaan, Priya Patidar, Vikram Montrose	3:54
2.	"Kyun"	Talwiinder	Talwiinder, NDS	Talwiinder, NDS	3:33
3.	"Ucha Lamba Kad Forever"	Anand Raaj Anand, Meggha Bali	Anand Raj Anand, Vikram Montrose	Anand Raj Anand, Rubai	3:34
4.	"Ghis Ghis Ghis"	Abhinav Shekhar	Akash Yadav, Vikram Montrose	Vikram Montrose, Supriyaa Paathak	2:13
5.	"Deewane Hain"	Anand Raj Anand	Anand Raj Anand	Amruta Fadnavis, Anand Raaj Anand	6:31
6.	"Tera Paisa Mera Paisa"	Meggha Bali	Vikram Montrose	Akshay Kumar, Farhad Bhiwandiwala, Rubai, Vikram Montrose	3:46
7.	"O Mere Balam"	Farhad Samji	Anand Raaj Anand	KavyaKriti, Saket Bairoliya, Ankit Gupta	2:49
8.	"Tera Paisa Mera Paisa" (Marathi Version)	Meggha Bali	Vikram Montrose	Farhad Bhiwandiwala, Vikram Montrose	1:28
9.	"Tera Paisa Mera Paisa" (Punjabi Version)	Meggha Bali	Vikram Montrose	Farhad Bhiwandiwala, Vikram Montrose, Meggha Bali	1:28
10.	"Tera Paisa Mera Paisa" (Tamil Version)	Meggha Bali	Vikram Montrose	Farhad Bhiwandiwala, Vikram Montrose	1:30
11.	"Tera Paisa Mera Paisa" (Gujarati Version)	Meggha Bali	Vikram Montrose	Farhad Bhiwandiwala, Vikram Montrose	1:28
12.	"Tera Paisa Mera Paisa" (Sindhi Version)	Meggha Bali	Vikram Montrose	Farhad Bhiwandiwala, Vikram Montrose	1:28
13.	"Tera Paisa Mera Paisa" (Bengali Version)	Meggha Bali	Vikram Montrose	Farhad Bhiwandiwala, Vikram Montrose	1:28
Total length:					35:10

== Release ==
=== Theatrical ===
Welcome to the Jungle was a worldwide theatrical release on 26 June 2026. Paid preview night shows were held on 25 June 2026.

=== Certification ===
The film received a UA 16+ certificate on 22 June 2026 by the Central Board of Film Certification (CBFC) [25] in a total duration of 164 minutes.

=== Home media ===
The film began streaming on JioHotstar from 21 August 2026.

== Reception ==
=== Box office ===
On its opening day, the film earned ₹14.80 crore at the domestic box office. Paid preview screenings held a day prior to its release contributed an additional ₹3.93 crore, taking the film's opening collection to ₹18.73 crore.

Welcome to the Jungle grossed ₹196.10 crore (US$21 million) worldwide. It grossed ₹162.50 crore (US$17 million) in India and ₹33.60 crore (US$3.6 million) in the overseas market.

=== Critical response ===
On the review aggregator website Rotten Tomatoes, 47% of 15 critics' reviews are positive, with an average rating of 5.40/10.

A critic at Scroll noted, "A comedy inspired by The Producers and Tropic Thunder, which itself is ripe for parody, cheerfully acknowledges its unending appetite for nonsensical scenes." Rahul Desai of The Hollywood Reporter India juxtaposed, "Whereas Tropic Thunder sent up everything from method acting to war-movie tropes, Welcome to the Jungle spoofs its own ilk: tax-evasion projects disguised as jingoistic spectacles, opportunistic filmmakers, exes working together, spineless stars who magically grow a conscience, film industries preying on the anxieties of a nation, and the formula of box-office success. The premise is localised." Agnivo Niyogi of The Telegraph pointed out, "one cannot help but miss the manic brilliance that Nana Patekar and Anil Kapoor brought to the earlier Welcome films. Their absence leaves a noticeable void that no amount of star power quite manages to fill." Rishabh Suri of Hindustan Times gave the film 3 stars out of 5, praising the comic timing of Rawal and Yadav, the acting performances of the ensemble cast, the chemistry of Kumar with his Hera Pheri colleagues (Shetty, Paresh Rawal, and Yadav), and the dialogues by Samji; however, he was disappointed by the film's soundtrack and found the climax too stretched out. Archika Khurana of The Times of India rated the film 3/5 stars as well, appreciating the comedy in the film remaining, "largely clean and situational rather than relying on forced vulgarity or loud gimmicks."

Vineeta Kumar of India Today rated the film 2.5/5 stars, writing that the film "wants to do it all—being a spoof, an action film, a patriotic drama, a romance, a social commentary, a war movie, and also a showcase for every celebrity with a free weekend." Saibal Chatterjee of NDTV rated the film 2/5 stars, remarking that the film "bungs in whatever it can rustle up and get away with. While it is at it, it lampoons, among other things, the overdose of patriotic fervor that Hindi films about anti-terror secret agents peddle these days." Aishani Biswas of Outlook gave it 2 stars out of 5 also and remarked, "The writing is messy, the politics are unnecessary, and much of the humor belongs to another time. Even so, buried beneath all that noise is a film that occasionally reminds you why this style of Bollywood comedy became so beloved in the first place." Shubhra Gupta of The Indian Express gave the film 1.5 stars out of 5, elaborating on the discourse around Bollywood's brain rot phenomenon, and wrote "This Welcome, groaning under the presence of all the heavyweights, lumbers about". Anuj Kumar of The Hindu critiqued, "The moments are engineered as a collection of 30-second conceptual hooks designed to trend on social media."
