= Welcome Back (film) =

2015 Indian film by Anees Bazmee

- Theatrical release poster
- Directed by: Anees Bazmee
- Screenplay by: Rajiv Kaul; Praful Parekh; Rajan Agarwal; Anees Bazmee
- Dialogues by: Raaj Shaandilyaa
- Story by: Anees Bazmee
- Produced by: Firoz Nadiadwala
- Starring: John Abraham; Anil Kapoor; Nana Patekar; Paresh Rawal; Shruti Hassan; Dimple Kapadia; Shiney Ahuja; Ankita Srivastava; Naseeruddin Shah
- Narrated by: Vijay Raaz
- Cinematography: Kabir Lal
- Edited by: Steven H. Bernard
- Music by: Songs: Anu Malik; Meet Bros Anjjan; Mika Singh; Abhishek Ray; Score: Aadesh Shrivastava
- Production companies: Base Industries Group; Swiss Entertainment
- Distributed by: Eros International
- Release date: 4 September 2015 (India)
- Running time: 152 minutes
- Country: India
- Language: Hindi
- Budget: ₹48 crore
- Box office: est. ₹167.37 crore

Welcome Back is a 2015 Indian Hindi-language crime comedy film directed by Anees Bazmee and produced by Firoz Nadiadwala. A sequel to the 2007 film Welcome, it features an ensemble cast that includes John Abraham, Anil Kapoor, Nana Patekar, Paresh Rawal, Shruti Haasan, Dimple Kapadia, Naseeruddin Shah, Shiney Ahuja, and Ankita Srivastava. The film was largely shot in and around Dubai, United Arab Emirates. Welcome Back was released worldwide on 4 September 2015.

== Plot ==
Foster brothers Uday Shetty and Majnu Pandey have ended their life of crime and are now honest businessmen, settling in Dubai after being duped by their brother-in-law Rajiv, but the two still remain unmarried. Two conwomen from India, Poonam and Babita, pose as Maharani Padmavati and Rajkumari Chandni of Najafgarh in order to con Uday and Majnu out of their money. Babita gains the attention of the two men, thus getting them to finance her and Poonam's luxurious lifestyle. Later, it is revealed that Uday has another sister Ranjana from his father, Shankar Shetty's third marriage and Majnu and Uday are emotionally blackmailed by Shankar into arranging the marriage of Ranjana and are also forced to do so as Poonam makes it one of her conditions for getting Babita married to either one of them.

Meanwhile, Rajiv's uncle, Dr. Ghunguroo, finds out that he has a stepson named Ajju from his wife's previous marriage that he was unaware. Unlike Rajiv who was decent, Ajju is brash and is a local goon of Mumbai, where Ranjana studies. Through a chain of hilarious events, they both fall in love with each other. Meanwhile, Majnu and Uday arrange the marriage of Ranjana with Ajju, not knowing that he is a goon. However, Majnu gets suspicious, and reveals the truth at the engagement ceremony, causing Ajju to retaliate with a fight, threatening to marry Ranjana without any of the brothers' consent.

Expecting to keep Ajju at bay, Uday and Majnu visit Wanted Bhai, an infamous blind don. They also return to their old, violent ways in order to kill Ajju. When they meet Wanted Bhai on his private island, the brothers are shocked to find that Wanted Bhai's son Honey likes Ranjana and would like to marry her, and flee in panic. They decide to arrange the marriage of Ranjana to some other decent man, in order to sidestep Ajju and Honey. However, due to Ajju and Dr. Ghunguroo, who are in league with Babita and Poonam, tipping off Wanted Bhai about Ranjana, everyone is caught and taken them to the island. Wanted Bhai decides to marry Poonam, so she and Babita decide to con him instead. At the island, Ajju and Dr. Ghunguroo try to convince Honey that he no longer loves Ranjana and that Babita is his true love. In response, Uday and Majnu try to kill Ajju, but are frightened at the graveyard in a ghost act planned by Dr. Ghunguroo, Ajju and Ranjana.

Unbeknownst to all of them, all their activities have been recorded on CCTV cameras set up all around the island, causing Wanted Bhai and Honey to plan to finish them off. However, Honey is kidnapped by the group and they escape towards the desert where they are chased by Wanted Bhai. To kill all of them, Wanted Bhai releases explosive choppers which Honey was controlling with his tablet, Ajju throws Honey's tablet into fire caused by the explosions. The choppers then attacked Wanted Bhai, In the midst of saving himself, Dr. Ghungroo pushes Wanted Bhai, causing him to faint. Meanwhile, a group of camels marches heavily there. Ajju is successful in saving Wanted Bhai from the stampede of camels, and restoring his sight. Wanted Bhai himself, as a form of gratitude, decides to arrange the marriage of Ajju with Ranjana, calling Ajju his 'second son'. However, they notice a sandstorm conjuring up, making everyone run for their lives.

== Cast ==
- Anil Kapoor as Sagar Pandey "Majnu Bhai"
- Nana Patekar in a dual role as
  - Don Uday Shetty
  - Shankar Shetty; Uday, Sanjana and Ranjana's father; Majnu's foster father
- John Abraham as Ajju Bhai / Ajay Barsi, Dr. Ghunghroo's stepson and Payal's son
- Shruti Haasan as Ranjana Shetty, Sanjana and Uday's half-sister, Majnu's foster sister
- Paresh Rawal as Dr. Ghunghroo, Ajju's stepfather
- Ankita Srivastava as Babita / Rajkumari Chandini
- Dimple Kapadia as Poonam / Maharani Padmavati
- Naseeruddin Shah as Wanted Bhai
- Shiney Ahuja as Honey
- Supriya Karnik as Payal Ghungroo
- Ranjeet as Rakesh Kapoor
- Neeraj Vora as Badshah Khan
- Mushtaq Khan as Ballu
- Adi Irani as Advocate Harikesh Sahni

=== Special appearances ===
- Akshay Kumar as Rajiv Saini in archive footage
- Katrina Kaif as Sanjana Shetty in archive footage
- Feroz Khan as Ranvir Dhanraj Xaka (RDX) in archive footage
- Rajpal Yadav as Tailor
- Lauren Gottlieb in song "20-20"
- Reema Debnath in song "20-20"
- Radhika Bangia in song "20-20"
- Sambhavna Seth in song "20-20"
- Sakshi Maggo in song "20-20"
- Shubhi Sharma in song "20-20"
- Surveen Chawla in song "Tutti Bole Wedding Di"
- Snigdha Gupta Mehta in song "Tutti Bole Wedding Di"
- Shereveer Vakil as Lucky Xaka in archive footage

== Production ==
A large portion of Welcome Back was shot in the United Arab Emirates. It is the first Bollywood film to be shot inside the Emirates Palace in Abu Dhabi. Later, a replica of the Emirates Palace was re-created in Mumbai's Film City to shoot the song "Tutti". A comedy sequence was shot at The Meydan, the world's first five-star track-side hotel, situated at the Meydan Racecourse in Dubai. Other filming locations include the Jumeirah Zabeel Saray Hotel, the Waldorf Astoria Dubai Palm Jumeirah, the Sofitel Hotel – The Palm, the Grand Hyatt Hotel, the Burj Khalifa and Rixos The Palm Dubai. A particular scene was shot in Dubai's Margham Desert, with 1000 camels being arranged for it. It was reported that a pivotal scene was shot on the personal yacht of the royal family of Dubai, Al Maktoum. Furthermore, it was said that limited edition luxury and sports automobiles including a Ferrari Spider, a Mansory Carbonado Apertos, an Aston Martin One-77 and a Rolls-Royce Phantom were used in the film.

== Soundtrack ==
Welcome Back

Soundtrack album by Anu Malik
- Released: 6 August 2015
- Genre: Feature film soundtrack
- Length: 46:29
- Label: T-Series

Anu Malik chronology
Dum Laga Ke Haisha (2015)	Welcome Back (2015)	Blackmail (2018)

The soundtrack for Welcome Back was composed by seven artists: Meet Bros Anjjan, Anu Malik, Mika Singh (each one song in collaboration with Yo Yo Honey Singh and Milind Gaba, Abhishek Ray and Siddhant Madhav. The lyrics were written by Kumaar and Manoj Muntashir. The music rights for the film were acquired by T-Series. The full audio album was released on 6 August 2015.

No.	Title	Singer(s)	Length
1.	"Tutti Bole Wedding Di"	Meet Bros, Shipra Goyal	04:23
2.	"20-20" (Title Track)	Mamta Sharma, Anu Malik, Shadab Faridi	05:56
3.	"Welcome Back"	Mika Singh, Geeta Jhala, Music Mg.	04:38
4.	"Meet Me Daily Baby"	Siddhant Madhav, Pawni A Pandey, Hyacinth Dsouza	04:57
5.	"Time Lagaye Kaiko"	John Abraham, Anmol Malik	05:42
6.	"Nas Nas Mein" (Promotional Track)	Rani Hazarika, Shabab Sabri	04:23
7.	"Welcome Back" (Beat Mix)	Mika Singh, Geeta Jhala, Music Mg.	03:40
8.	"Meet Me Daily Baby" (Beat Mix)	Harshit Saxena, Pawni A Pandey, Hyacinth Dsouza	04:57
9.	"Welcome Back" (Theme)	Abhishek Ray	03:48
10.	"Tutti Bole Wedding Di" (MB Swag)	Meet Bros, Shipra Goyal, Ambresh, Ved, Ashish, Ruchir & Bipin	03:52
Total length:			46:29

== Reception ==
=== Critical reception ===
On the review aggregator website Rotten Tomatoes, 40% of 10 critics' reviews are positive, with an average rating of 4.3/10.

Bollywood Hungama gave the film 3.5 stars out of and wrote, "if you enjoy slapstick comedy that defies logic and have enjoyed Welcome, then Welcome Back is surely a paisa vasool entertainer for you". Dhriti Sharma, writing for Zee News, stated, Welcome Back is vibrant and the ensemble cast keeps it gripping. The screenplay is brilliant, just a little bit of loops in editing in the first song. The comic flavour of the movie has been kept intact, and the direction has been profoundly beaded into scenes". Ananya Bhattacharya from India Today gave it 3 stars out of 5 and wrote, "Welcome Back is quite the laugh riot that can de-stress you after the atrocities of the week. Leave the brains aside, and you have (at least) two hours of hardcore fun". Rohit Vats from Hindustan Times gave the film 2.5 out of 5 and wrote, "Welcome Back is funny in parts, but that Welcome fluidity is missing big time. There are moments but they are very limited in number. Welcome Back's pace is its biggest asset and that may make you enjoy this 153-minute long film". Deepanjana Pal from Firstpost wrote, "At 153 minutes, Welcome Back is just a shade too long and the ending is a sandstorm of stupidity. But you'll forgive Bazmee and gang because for at least 120 minutes, this comedy keeps you in splits. Welcome Back might be 2015's silliest film, and this is the best reason to watch it". Shilpa Jamkhandikar, writing for Reuters, stated, "Welcome Back is sporadically funny, one that ebbs and flows; but it just about passes the 'guilty pleasure' test thanks to Kapoor and Patekar". Filmfare wrote, "watch the film if you like cornball comedies. It's a pure massy, masala entertainer that's good to go on a lazy weekend". Rediff's Raja Sen, while giving the film 2 stars out of 5, wrote, "Welcome Back is dumb yet entertaining, utterly silly but made with a kind of absurd, warm energy". Shubha Shetty-Saha from Mid-day called the film "a blazing example of the 'Leave your brains at home' variety" and "a fun watch which will keep you snorting and giggling even after you exit the theatre".

Rajeev Masand for News 18 gave the film 2 stars out of 5 and wrote, "It's Nana and Anil, in fact – along with the impossibly gifted Paresh Rawal – who're the real stars of this film, bringing so much manic energy and good-natured stupidity to a familiar, shopworn premise". Shubhra Gupta writing for The Indian Express gave the film 1.5 stars out of 5 and stated, Welcome had a welcome lightness in most of its steps. And it made us laugh. Welcome Back, minus Akshay and Katrina, plus John and Shruti, and Dimple and a new girl, and Naseer and Shiney, clomps about, looking for the laughs. And failing, mostly, to find them". Saibal Chatterjee from NDTV wrote, 'nothing that this nonsensical action comedy unleashes, not even the in-form Anil Kapoor-Nana Patekar pair, can compensate for its absence of substance. Welcome Back...is as appealing as a dunk in a garbage dump'. Livemint's Uday Bhatia wrote, 'Over its cruelly prolonged 150-minute running time, Welcome Back treats human intellect with the sort of disdain that's remarkable even for Bollywood. It's not just that these are old gags; they've been repurposed so lazily that you can see the actors tiring of a scene even as they perform it'.

=== Box office ===
The film became a box office success and collected an estimated ₹133.26 crore (US$14 million) in 17 days. The final worldwide gross was ₹167.37 crore (US$17 million).

=== India ===
On its first day, the film grossed ₹14.35 crore (US$1.5 million), while collecting ₹17.05 crore (US$1.8 million) on its second day and ₹19.60 crore (US$2.0 million) on its third day. The film collected ₹73.75 crore (US$7.7 million) in its first week. Welcome Back had ₹11.75 crore (US$1.2 million) nett in its second weekend with a total 10-day collection of ₹85 crore (US$8.8 million).

=== Overseas ===
On its first day, the film grossed ₹8 crore (US$830,000).On its second day, the film grossed ₹5 crore (US$520,000).On its third day, the film grossed ₹8.38 crore (US$870,000). The film has collected $4.25 million plus in the first week. The film collected $1.5 million approx. in gulf and $1 million in US/Canada.

== Sequel ==
After the success of two films, the makers announced a third instalment of this franchise on 10 September 2023, titled Welcome to the Jungle.
