= Khel – No Ordinary Game =

2003 Indian film by Yusuf Khan

Khel
- DVD cover
- Directed by: Yusuf Khan
- Screenplay by: Dilip Shukla
- Story by: Yusuf Khan
- Produced by: Suniel Shetty; Galaxy Entertainment Corp. Ltd
- Starring: Sunny Deol; Suniel Shetty; Celina Jaitly; Ajay Jadeja; Gulshan Grover
- Cinematography: Soori; Manoj Gupta
- Edited by: Yusuf Khan
- Music by: Songs: Babbu Mann; Daboo Malik; Dudes' (Music company); Score: Sandeep; Jackie
- Production companies: Popcorn Motion Pictures Pvt. Ltd. Galaxy Entertainment Corp. Ltd.
- Release date: 3 October 2003
- Running time: 174 minutes
- Country: India
- Language: Hindi

Khel – No Ordinary Game, shortly called Khel is a 2003 Indian Hindi-language action film directed by Yusuf Khan and produced by Suniel Shetty (through his owned production house: Popcorn Motion Pictures Pvt. Ltd.). It stars Sunny Deol, Suniel Shetty and Celina Jaitly in pivotal roles, along with by Ajay Jadeja and Gulshan Grover. Former Indian cricketer Ajay Jadeja made his Bollywood debut with this film. It was released on 3 October 2003.

== Plot ==
A corrupt multimillionaire industrialist businessman, Dev Maliya, takes a personal interest in an attractive interior designer, Sanjh Batra, and wants to marry her. He starts by hiring her to redo the interior of his palatial home. He makes it a point to be pleasant to her and her mom, Mrs. Kiran Batra. One day, Dev finds out that Sanjh has some feelings for his friend, Rohan Potdar and this knowledge makes him insecure. Shortly after, Rohan is arrested for murder and sentenced to life imprisonment. This news breaks Saanjh's heart, and she eventually consents to marry Dev Mallya. All is perfect in Dev's world, until ACP Rajveer Scindia announces the re-opening of the case against Rohan Potdar, as he is convinced that Rohan is the victim of a conspiracy.

== Cast ==
- Sunny Deol as ACP Rajveer Scindia
- Suniel Shetty as Dev Maliya
- Celina Jaitly as Saanjh Batra
- Ajay Jadeja as Rohan Potdar
- Gulshan Grover as Inspector Khushwant Chadhha
- Suhasini Mulay as Daadi
- Vivek Shauq as Girish Mathur
- Supriya Karnik as Kiran Batra

== Music and soundtrack ==
Khel – No Ordinary Game

Soundtrack album by Babbu Maan Daboo Malik Dudes' Music Company
- Released: 19 August 2003
- Genre: Feature film soundtrack
- Label: Times Music

The music for the film's songs was composed by Babbu Mann, Daboo Malik and Dudes' Music Company, and the songs' lyrics were penned by Faaiz Anwar, Salim Bijnori, Baboo Mann, Praveen Bhardwaj and Rahul B. Seth. The background score of the movie was done by Sandeep and Jackie.

1. "Sharrata" - Sukhwinder Singh, Babbu Maan, Suniel Shetty, Ajay Jadeja
2. "Pyar Hone Laga Hai" - Kumar Sanu, Kavita Krishnamurthy, Suniel Shetty, Celina Jaitley
3. "Kiya Hai Jadu Iss Kadar" - Shaan, Shailendra Kumar, S. P. Sailaja, Suniel Shetty, Celina Jaitley, Ajay Jadeja
4. "Chori Chori Mere Dil Ko" - Sunidhi Chauhan, Shaan
5. "Jadu Sa Mujhpe Chal Raha" - Kumar Sanu, Kavita Krishnamurthy
6. "Moment of Love" - S. P. Sailaja
7. "Tumko Kitna Hai Mujhse Pyar" - Sonu Nigam, Sunidhi Chauhan
8. "Moment of Passion" - Kumar Sanu

== Critical response ==
Taran Adarsh of IndiaFM gave the film 2 stars out of 5, writing ″On the whole, KHEL is a fair entertainer its target audience being the masses, not critics or multiplex-going audience. At the box-office, the holiday period will help the film take a good start and eventually, it will find patronage in the interiors.″ Anjum N of Rediff.com wrote ″Editor-turned-director Yusuf Khan does a fair job, but is handicapped by a story that has no suspense, twists or unpredictable, manipulative characters. But, having written the story himself, he cannot blame anyone else if his 'ultimate game' fails to take off.″ Manish Gajjar of BBC.com wrote ″Overall Khel is good escapist cinema which will appeal to the younger generation.″
