= Rakht =

2004 Indian film directed by Mahesh Manjrekar

- Film poster
- Directed by: Mahesh Manjrekar
- Written by: Mahesh Manjrekar
- Produced by: Sunil Shetty
- Starring: Bipasha Basu; Sanjay Dutt; Dino Morea; Sunil Shetty; Amrita Arora; Neha Dhupia
- Cinematography: Vijay Kumar Arora
- Music by: Anand Raj Anand; Anand–Milind; Shamir Tandon; Naresh Sharma; Shaan; Blue
- Distributed by: Popcorn Motion Pictures; AA Films
- Release date: 3 September 2004
- Running time: 150 minutes
- Country: India
- Language: Hindi
- Budget: ₹120 million
- Box office: ₹84.4 million

Rakht (transl. Blood) is a 2004 Indian supernatural horror film, written and directed by Mahesh Manjrekar. The film stars Bipasha Basu, Sanjay Dutt, Suniel Shetty, Dino Morea, Amrita Arora and Neha Dhupia. The film is a remake of the 2000 American film The Gift. The film released on 3 September 2004, and received mixed to negative reviews from critics, who praised the performances of Basu and Shetty but criticized the story and screenplay. The film was a major box-office disappointment.

== Plot ==
The story is about a young widow named Drishti Nair. She is a psychic and has the gift of seeing into the future of anybody. After her breakup with boyfriend Manav, who truly loved her but had to move away to a different city, Drishti moves to a small, remote village, where she meets Mohit, an eccentric car mechanic who needs psychiatric treatment due to years of abuse at the hands of his father. Mohit has a crush on Drishti, which Drishti is unaware of. She performs the job of Tarot card reading to locals, one of her customers being Rhea Trehan. Rhea is a young woman who is repeatedly beaten up by her husband Sunny. Rhea pleads for help from Drishti, who agrees. However, one day, when Drishti's son comes home from school, he is harassed by Sunny, who calls Drishti a witch and tells her son to stay away from his mother.

Sunny also breaks into their house and threatens Drishti to stay out of Rhea's life. When Mohit investigates that Drishti is being troubled by Sunny, the two enter a violent confrontation. After the brawl, Sunny is seen nowhere near Drishti. Drishti is living happily, until one day, the daughter of Mayor Raja Bahadur Singh, Natasha, suddenly goes missing. Her fiancé Rahul comes to Drishti and asks her for her help to find Natasha. Since Rahul is Drishti's son's school principal, she accepts. Soon enough, Drishti sees a vision of Natasha hanging to her death opposite a river. Drishti informs Rahul, and the police finally find Natasha's dead body.

On top of this, it turns out that Sunny owns the river opposite to Natasha's death place. Sunny is then arrested, and the case of Natasha's murder is handed to ACP Ranbir Singh, who does not believe in Drishti's gift and also believes that Sunny is innocent and the actual murderer is still free. And finally, it is known that Rahul is the real murderer. He says he did it to avenge the loss of his dad in the mayoral election and is about to kill Drishti when Mohit knocks him out from behind. Mohit drives Drishti to the police station, where the inspector reveals Rahul accepted his crime but also says that Mohit committed suicide, but according to Drishti, he is waiting in the car. When she looks outside, Mohit is not there.

In the end, Drishti is finally reunited with Manav.

== Cast ==
- Sanjay Dutt as Principal Rahul Kumar
- Suniel Shetty as Mohit Jaiswal
- Dino Morea as Suniel Trehan / Sunny
- Bipasha Basu as Drishti Nair
  - Sheena Bajaj as Young Drishti Nair
- Amrita Arora as Natasha Badola
- Neha Dhupia as Rhea Trehan
- Himanshu Malik as Abhigyan Gupta
- Rajat Bedi as ACP Ranbir Singh
- Sharat Saxena as Mayor Raja Bahadur
- Payal Rohatgi as Tanya Abrol
- Shivaji Satam as Drishti's father
- Beena Banerjee as Drishti's mother
- Shashikala as Drishti's grandmother
- Sachin Khedekar as Defending Lawyer Shinde for Sunny.
- Abhishek Bachchan as Manav Rajput (guest appearance)
- Yana Gupta as dancer in item song oh what a babe. (special appearance)

== Soundtrack ==
Rakht

Soundtrack album by Anand Raaj Anand Anand–Milind Shamir Tandon Naresh Sharma Shaan, Blue
- Released: 26 June 2004
- Genre: Feature film soundtrack
- Label: T-Series

Track listing
No.	Title	Lyrics	Music	Singer(s)	Length
1.	"Ishq Bedardi Ishq Bedardi"	Deepak Sneh	Naresh Sharma	Alka Yagnik, Anuradha Paudwal	5:58
2.	"Hadd Se Zyaada Sanam"	Deepak Sneh	Naresh Sharma	Shreya Ghoshal, Sonu Nigam	6:35
3.	"Jannat Hai Ye Zameen"	Anand Raaj Anand	Anand Raaj Anand	Krishna Beura, Swarnalatha	4:38
4.	"Sach Hai Sach Hai Ye"	Anand Raaj Anand	Anand Raaj Anand	Krishna Beura	4:58
5.	"Kya Maine Socha"	Shaan	Shaan, Blue	Shaan, Blue	3:28
6.	"Hadd Se Zyaada Sanam" (sad)	Deepak Sneh	Naresh Sharma	Sonu Nigam	3:09
7.	"Quiero"	Salim Binjori	Anand–Milind	Viva	5:09
8.	"Oh what a Babe!"	Ajay Jhingran	Shamir Tandon	Sunidhi Chauhan, Shweta Shetty	5:06
9.	"Oh what a Babe!" (Club mix)	Ajay Jhingran	Shamir Tandon	Shweta Shetty	5:14
10.	"Oh what a Babe!" (Techno mix)	Ajay Jhingran	Shamir Tandon	Ritika Sahani	4:59
11.	"Rakht"	Sandip Nath	Shamir Tandon	Aaroh, KK, Mahesh Manjrekar	5:13

== Critical reception ==
Rediff.com stated that, "Suniel as Mohit has done a good job. Dino, as the abusive husband is very good especially when he threatens Bipasha at her home. Bipasha and Neha are competent. Sanjay is his usual deadpan till the climax. Amrita looks the hottest among the women. And though Abhishek Bachchan has only a tiny cameo in the film, he is charming." Taran Adarsh writing for Bollywood Hungama rated the film 2.5/5 and stated, "On the whole, RAKHT is appealing in parts and will therefore meet with mixed reactions from the paying public. At the box-office, the film should strike a chord with the multiplex-going viewers mainly [thanks to its classy look and city-centric treatment], but its prospects at mass-oriented cinema halls could prove to be a matter of concern.."
