= Krishna (1996 Hindi film) =

- Directed by: Deepak Shivdasani
- Written by: Santosh Saroj (dialogues); Tinu Anand (story-screenplay)
- Produced by: Dhirajlal Shah
- Starring: Sunil Shetty; Karishma Kapoor; Om Puri; Shakti Kapoor; Tinu Anand
- Cinematography: Teja; Sameer Reddy
- Edited by: V. N. Mayekar
- Music by: Anu Malik
- Production company: Time Magnetics
- Release date: 2 August 1996
- Running time: 164 mins
- Country: India
- Language: Hindi
- Budget: ₹6.25 crore
- Box office: ₹15.61 crore

Krishna is a 1996 Indian action film directed by Deepak Shivdasani, starring Sunil Shetty, Karishma Kapoor, Om Puri, Shakti Kapoor, Tinnu Anand and Kulbhushan Kharbanda. The film was a hit at the box office. The music of the film was also popular with hit songs such as "Jhanjariya". The film was mostly a remake of Deep Cover (1992) starring Lawrence "Larry" Fishburne and Jeff Goldblum.

== Plot ==
Krishna is a new name in the world of crime, whose exploits attract the attention of Raja, an heir to a dead underworld don. Raja is just reduced to remain at the mercy of Bhujang Rao, aka Bhau, another don. Raja loathes Bhujang and his attitude and extends a hand to Krishna, who accepts the offer. Bhau tries to convince Krishna of a brighter future if he joins Bhau's gang, but Krishna remains with Raja. Meanwhile, Rashmi, a club dancer, is lamenting the loss of Sunil, her love. Sunil, who was Krishna's lookalike, was a pilot who died during his training session. Rashmi refuses to believe so, hoping that Sunil will return.

During a gig, Rashmi runs into Krishna and is thrilled to see him. Krishna tells her firmly that he is not Sunil. Only when she sees that a tattoo bearing Rashmi's name, which was supposed to be on Sunil's arm, is missing from Krishna's arm, does she leave, broken-hearted and dejected. Some goons try to rape her and she is saved by Krishna. Krishna reveals that he is indeed Sunil and goes on to tell her the truth. He reveals that his instructor was actually acting as a link for some criminals. He forced Sunil to land at an abandoned place to meet the criminals.

One of the criminals was Cobra, an infamous name in the underworld. The deal went wrong and Sunil's instructor was killed. Sunil survived and nobody had seen his face. He was wrongfully arrested as a suspect and minister Amar Prabhakar bailed him out. Amar told him that if he wants to survive, he has to take down all the people who could pose a possible threat. So, Sunil got booked under another name – Krishna. Meanwhile, Cobra returns to India and it is revealed that both Bhau and Raja are on his payroll. Cobra decides to make Raja the de facto ruler of his operations in India. Raja tells him about Krishna.

Cobra and Krishna meet, where Cobra suspects that he has seen Krishna somewhere earlier. Sunil knows that Cobra may recognise him, but understands that now he has come too far. Later, Raja drops by a brothel, where Sunil is surprised to see his sister perform. His sister is shocked to see him too and commits suicide out of shame. Sunil learns from another dancer that most of the dancers have the same story to share – a man came in their life pretending to be a benefactor, married them, and sold them, while they were raped before ending up here. He realises that the man whom he gave his sister to is responsible for the ruin of many girls' lives.

The dancer also tells him that he keeps a record, mostly videotapes of the people he has sold the girls to, in order to blackmail them. In a fit of rage, Sunil accosts the man, but he dies. Sunil receives another blow when he learns that his mother has died. Amar keeps the truth under wraps and gives Sunil's mother a proper funeral. Sunil also learns that Amar's own daughter has been kidnapped and that Cobra has the tape which may uncover the identity of his sister's rapist. On learning of Cobra's other deal with Bhau and Raja, Sunil decides to end it all. In a bloody aftermath, the criminals are killed.

Sunil finds the tape, whereby he is shocked to discover that his sister was raped by none other than Amar. Here, it is revealed that Amar's daughter was not kidnapped; it was only a ploy to garner public sympathy for the next elections. However, the Commissioner learns of this fraud and Amar has him captured. The next day, Amar is giving a speech when an enraged Sunil turns up. He makes his way to Amar. The Commissioner, who has somehow succeeded in escaping, manages to save Sunil from being taken down. He pleads to Sunil to let the police take over. Amar tries to run away, taking advantage of the situation, but Sunil removes a Sudarshan Chakra from an idol of Lord Krishna and beheads Amar with it. With Amar dead, Sunil surrenders.

== Cast ==
- Suniel Shetty as Krishna / Sunil
- Karishma Kapoor as Rashmi
- Om Puri as Amar Prabhakar
- Shakti Kapoor as Raja
- Mohan Joshi as Bhujang Rao / aka Bhau
- Tinu Anand as Cobra
- Kulbhushan Kharbanda as DCP Khanna
- Rohini Hattangadi as Sunil's mother
- Eva Grover as Sudha, Sunil's sister
- Vinay Sapru as Karan, Sudha's Fraud husband.
- Lalit Tiwari as Sunil's Instructor
- Deep Dhillon as Ranga, Sharpshooter
- Ishrat Ali as Police Inspector Khote
- Virendra Saxena as Police Inspector Inamdar
- Mushtaq Khan as Popat / Phukat
- Shiva Rindani as Safed Ghoda / Pandu
- Amit Singh as Don Vishwa
- Vipin Sharma as Panditji

== Soundtrack ==
All songs composed by Anu Malik, with lyrics by Nida Fazli, Anwar Sagar, Anand Raaj Anand, and Madan Pal. "Jhanjariya" song was re-adapted from Anand Raaj Anand's "Babu Tips Music" album.

#	Title	Singer(s)
1.	"Jhanjharia" (Male)	Abhijeet
2.	"Koi Kaise Mohabbat"	Kumar Sanu, Sadhana Sargam
3.	"Main Kya Thi Kya Se Kya Ho Gayi"	Bela Sulakhe
4.	"Masti Masti"	Anu Malik, Poornima
5.	"Darwaze Pe Tere Baarat"	Abhijeet
6.	"Main is Kadar Mere Mehboob"	Vinod Rathod, Alka Yagnik
7.	"Jhanjharia" (Female)	Alka Yagnik
8.	"Darwaze Pe Tere" (Sad)	Abhijeet
