= Red Alert: The War Within =

- Directed by: Ananth Narayan Mahadevan
- Written by: Aruna Raje
- Produced by: Rahul Aggarwal; T. P. Aggarwal
- Starring: Vinod Khanna; Sunil Shetty; Bhagyashree; Sameera Reddy; Ayesha Dharker; Seema Biswas; Naseeruddin Shah
- Music by: Lalit Pandit
- Production company: Star Entertainment Pvt Ltd
- Release dates: 19 July 2009 (Stuttgart Bollywood and Beyond); 9 July 2010 (India)
- Running time: 120 minutes
- Country: India
- Language: Hindi

Red Alert: The War Within, shortly called Red Alert, is an Indian crime drama film directed by Ananth Narayan Mahadevan. It was released theatrically in India on 9 July 2010. The drama is based on the true story of Narsimha, who gets caught up in a clash between police and Naxalites and is then forced to work with the latter.

Red Alert premiered at the 6th Stuttgart Film Festival in 2009.

== Plot ==
Narasimha is directed to deliver food to an unknown location in the forest, only to be ambushed and caught in a cross fire between Andhra naxalites and police, which he survives but is forced to work as a naxalite with the group. Narasimha soon blends in but thereafter begins to get second thoughts about his deeds

== Cast ==
Source for first 12 cast-members: Characters per additional sources.

- Vinod Khanna as Krishnaraj
- Sunil Shetty as Narsimha
- Bhagyashree as Uma
- Sameera Reddy as Laxmi
- Ayesha Dharker as Radhika
- Seema Biswas as Sarala
- Ashish Vidyarthi as Velu
- Gulshan Grover as DIG Rathod
- Naseeruddin Shah as Naga (Cameo)
- Makrand Deshpande as Raghavan
- Ehsan Khan as Krishna
- Ashraful Haque as Naxalite
- Vikas Shrivastav as Naxalite

== Song ==
The film contains only one song, sung by KK.

- "Poochhta Hai Dil Yeh Tera" – KK

== Release ==
The Hindi-language film was dubbed into Telugu, Chhattisgarhi and English versions, with all four versions scheduled to be released the same day. Rahul Aggarwal, one of the producers, said all the actors dubbed their English lines themselves.

The film was originally scheduled to be completed and released in 2008.

== Response ==
The film was not reviewed by a sufficient number of contributing critics to be rated at the review aggregating site Rotten Tomatoes. Rachel Saltz of The New York Times said the film "seems torn between two storytelling modes: episodic with a documentary flavor and action-driven pulp. It makes a hash of both." She added, "For some reason [it] has been dubbed into heavily accented English for American release, adding an unnecessary 'What did he say?' level of difficulty." Frank Lovece of Film Journal International echoed that, saying, the film "plays like one of those stiff historical drams that educational-film companies make for schools. Or in this case, an outsourced educational-film company." Adam Keleman of Slant believed, "The unforgivable flaw of the film is its lack of subtlety, the way character detail and plot development is laid for us on a silver platter, never requiring the audience to ... fully engage with the intricacies of the lead character's internal and moral quandary."

== Accolades ==
- Winner, Director's Vision Award at the 2009 Stuttgart Film Festival
- Winner, South Asian International Film Festival Award for Best Actor - Sunil Shetty
- Winner, Stardust Search Light Award for Best Actor - Sunil Shetty
