= Akshara Singh =

Indian actress (born 1993)

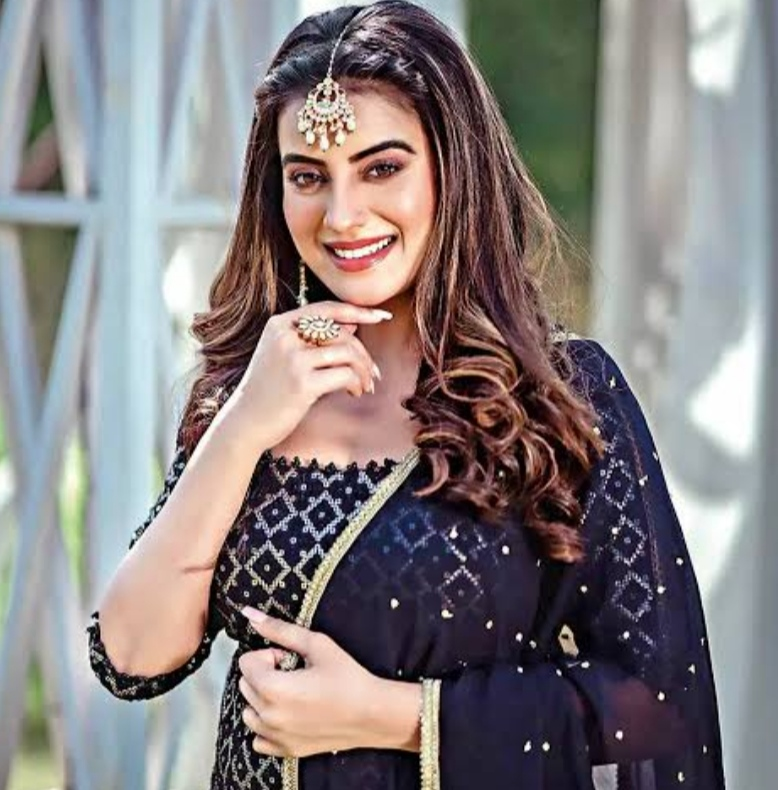
- Singh in 2023
- Occupations: Actress; dancer
- Years active: 2010–present

Akshara Singh (pronounced [əkˈʂəɾaː ˈsɪŋɡʱ]) is an Indian actress who primarily works in Bhojpuri films. Referred to in the media as the "Bhojpuri Female Superstar". She has received several accolades. Singh is known for her roles in Tabadala, Sarkar Raj and Satya. In 2021, she participated in Bigg Boss OTT 1.

== Career ==
Singh made her acting debut opposite Ravi Kishan in the 2010 action drama Satyamev Jayate. She subsequently appeared in 2011 family drama Pran Jaye Par Vachan Na Jaye.

Singh first appeared in Hindi television in 2015 on Kaala Teeka and Service Wali Bahu on Zee TV. Singh subsequently played the role of Gandhari in the Indian historical epic Suryaputra Karn and Kadika for the historical show Porus on Sony TV.

In 2026, Singh made her Hindi-film debut with an appearance in the song "Ghis Ghis Ghis" from the Hindi-language comedy film Welcome to the Jungle, alongside Akshay Kumar.

== Filmography ==
=== Films ===
Year	Title	Role	Note	Ref.
2010	Satyamev Jayate	Neha	Debut film	
2012	Saugandh Ganga Maiya Ke	Laila		
2013	Diler	Rani		
2015	Saathiya	Khushi		
2017	Satya	Sapna		
2017	Tabadala	Kiran		
2017	Dhadkan	Gulabo		
2017	Sarkar Raj	Sapna		
2018	Maa Tujhe Salaam	Geeta		
2020	Love Marriage	Sudha		
2025	Rudra - Shakti			
2026	Welcome to the Jungle	Special appearance in song "Ghis Ghis Ghis"	Hindi film	

=== Television ===
Year	Title	Role	Note(s)	Ref(s)
2015	Kaala Teeka	Madhuri Jha	Serial drama	
2015	Service Wali Bahu	Gulkand Ayodhya Prasad	Serial drama	
2017–2018	Porus	Maharani Kadika	Indian historical drama	

== Media image ==
Singh is considered among the most popular and one of the highest paid Bhojpuri actress. She is one of the most followed Bhojpuri actress on Instagram.

Singh joined Prashant Kishor's Jan Suraaj campaign hinting she may contest the upcoming Lok Sabha elections in 2024. She said:

"If it's in my destiny and I'll get love and support of people I may contest the poll but only time will tell about this [...] Being a daughter of Bihar, I would love to serve for the betterment and development of the State."

== See also ==
- Bhojpuri cinema
- List of Bhojpuri actresses
