= Pehchaan (1993 film) =

- Poster
- Directed by: Deepak Shivdasani
- Written by: Robin Bhatt; Javed Siddiqi; Sujit Sen
- Produced by: A.K.Abdul; Jeevat A.T
- Starring: Sunil Shetty; Saif Ali Khan; Shilpa Shirodkar; Madhoo
- Cinematography: Thomas A. Xavier
- Edited by: A. Muthu
- Music by: Anand Milind
- Distributed by: A J Combines
- Release date: 8 October 1993
- Running time: 138 minutes
- Country: India
- Language: Hindi

Pehchaan (transl. Recognition) is a 1993 Indian Hindi-language action drama film directed by Deepak Shivdasani and co-produced by A.K. Abdul and Jeevat A.T. The film stars Sunil Shetty, Saif Ali Khan, Shilpa Shirodkar, Madhoo in pivotal roles.

== Plot ==
Judge Jagdish Verma's family consists of his wife, Urmila, and their sons, Kunal and Karan.

Judge Verma has an accused named Shankar Yogi in his courtroom. He was once Shankar's defence lawyer, but now must pass a sentence against him. Shankar pleads his innocence, but the Judge finds him guilty and Shankar is sentenced to seven years' imprisonment. He swears to avenge this injustice and humiliation.

Shankar serves his term and is released from jail, seeking revenge against Judge Verma and his family. He abducts a pregnant Urmila, which her family doesn't know yet. He holds her captive for a few months. Urmila gives birth to Tina but Judge Verma rejects the newborn, assuming that his wife was impregnated by Shankar, who then plans to use Tina to destroy the judge and his family. The family is instructed not to contact the police, for the safety of Urmila and to keep this abduction a secret. Tina grows up in the company of Shankar and his men, without knowing her biological family. She is then used to ensnare the family into more deceit and entrapment under the direction of Shankar, leaving the Verma family no choice but to go along with Shankar's plan.

== Cast ==
- Sunil Shetty as Kunal Verma
- Saif Ali Khan as Karan Verma
- Shilpa Shirodkar as Seema Verma
- Madhoo as Tina Verma
- Raza Murad as Judge Jagdish Verma
- Kiran Kumar as Shankar Yogi
- Siddharth Ray as Robert
- Avtar Gill as Veeru
- Beena Banerjee as Urmila Verma

== Soundtrack ==
The music was composed by Anand-Milind and written by Sameer. The songs were popular during the time the film was released.

#	Title	Singer(s)
1	"Tu Mere Dil Mein Rehti Hai"	Abhijeet
2	"Ankhon Mein Kya"	Abhijeet, Kavita Krishnamurthy
3	"Sanam O Sanam"	Abhijeet, Kavita Krishnamurthy
4	"Nazuk Nazuk Nazuk"	Udit Narayan, Alka Yagnik
5	"Dheere Dheere Nazar Ladne De"	Poornima
6	"Log Aate Hai"	Poornima
