= Supriya Karnik =

Indian actress

- Born: 13 March 1975 (age 51)
- Occupation: Actress
- Years active: 1992–present

Supriya Karnik (born 13 March 1975) is an Indian actress known for her works in Hindi cinema, Telugu cinema, Marathi cinema, and Television. Supriya is a former model, flight attendant and PR officer.

== Personal life ==
Karnik started working at a young age. Karnik, who had just passed the 10th standard, took lessons from children younger than her. She worked in some shops. Karnik then went to Gulf. There she worked as a flight attendant in the airline company there. Karnik returned to India. From 1992 she turned to acting.

== Television ==
In 1996, Karnik worked with Marathi actor Ramesh Bhatkar in the Marathi TV serial Tisra Dola when it was on the Doordarshan channel.

== Filmography ==
=== As actress ===
Year	Title	Role	Language	Notes	Ref.
1998	Main Solah Baras Ki	Twinkle	Hindi		
1999	Taal	Shakuntala Mehta	Hindi		
2000	Jis Desh Mein Ganga Rehta Hai	Supriya Gokhale	Hindi		
2001	Dhai Akshar Prem Ke	Monica Preetam Grewal	Hindi		
2001	Jodi No.1	Shanno Rai Bua	Hindi		
2001	Yaadein	Nalini Malhotra	Hindi		
2001	Nuvvu Nenu	Rajendar's partner	Telugu		
2002	Haan Maine Bhi Pyaar Kiya	Neha Kashyap	Hindi		
2002	Hum Kisise Kum Nahin	Dr. D. D's Wife	Hindi		
2003	Waah! Tera Kya Kehna	Madhu Oberoi	Hindi		
2003	Tujhe Meri Kasam	Rohini	Hindi		
2003	Ek Aur Ek Gyarah	Priti's Mother	Hindi		
2003	Yeh Dil	Mrs. Chowdhary	Hindi		
2003	Supari	Papad's Sister	Hindi		
2003	Andaaz	Engagement party guest	Hindi		
2003	Miss India: the Mystery	Mrs. Gujaral	Hindi		
2003	Khel – No Ordinary Game	Kiran Batra	Hindi		
2004	Mujhse Shaadi Karogi	Rama Dugraj Singh	Hindi		
2004	Kuch Tho Gadbad Hain	Devika B. Khanna	Hindi		
2004	He Aapla Asach Chalyacha	Sushila Rane	Marathi		
2005	Padmashree Laloo Prasad Yadav	Maya Tom's wife	Hindi		
2005	Bewafaa	Manjari "Manju" Sharma	Hindi		
2005	Zameer	Kulwant Dildar's wife	Hindi		
2005	Karkaa Kasadara	Rahul's mother	Tamil		
2006	Madhubaala	Sanjana Oberoi	Hindi		
2006	Jaadu Sa Chal Gaya	Mrs. Zariwala	Hindi		
2006	Shaadi Karke Phas Gaya Yaar	Pammi Kapoor	Hindi		
2006	Aryan	Devika	Hindi		
2007	Nehlle Pe Dehlla	Tantrik	Hindi		
2007	Deha	Jayashree Jai	Hindi		
2007	Welcome	Payal Ghunghroo	Hindi		
2008	Mukhbir	Bharati Rathod	Hindi		
2009	Meri Life Mein Uski Wife	Kumud's wife	Hindi		
2009	Sanam Hum Aapke Hain	Kamini R Varma	Hindi		
2009	De Dana Dan	Kamini Kaur Lamba	Hindi		
2010	Khaleja	GK's wife	Telugu		
2011	Sheethalbhaabhi.com	Kumud's wife	Hindi		
2012	Zindagi Tere Naam	Sushma	Hindi		
2012	498A: The Wedding Gift	Madhu	Hindi		
2013	Lek Ladki		Hindi		
2013	Rabba Main Kya Karoon	Bubble	Hindi		
2014	The Xposé	Supriya	Hindi		
2015	Take It Easy		Hindi		
2015	Second Hand Husband	Pammi	Hindi		
2015	Welcome Back	Payal Ghunghroo	Hindi		
2017	Machine	Mrs. Puri	Hindi		
2017	2016 The End	Rani Sahiba	Hindi		
2017	Humein Haq Chahiye Haq Se	Leader	Hindi		
2018	Veere Di Wedding	Juhi Bhalla	Hindi		
2020	Prawaas	Vidya	Marathi		
2020	Zol Zaal		Marathi		
2021	Main Mulayam Singh Yadav	Indira Gandhi	Hindi	LIFFT India Award for Best Supporting Actress	
2022	Match of Life	Monica	Hindi		
2025	Badass Ravi Kumar	Binny	Hindi		

=== Television ===
Year	Title	Role	Language	Notes	Ref.
1994	Fifty Fifty		Hindi	Zee TV	
1994	Hatim Tai		Hindi	Zee TV	
1995	Dastaan	Roma	Hindi	Zee TV	
1997	Saturday Suspense		Hindi	Zee TV	
1998	Teesra Dola	Inspector Shalini	Hindi		
2001	Chandan Ka Palna Resham Ki Dori	Mitali Bhimani	Hindi		
2001	Chingari		Hindi		
2001	Ssshhhh...Koi Hai		Hindi		
2002-2004	Devi	Kamini Satyen Kapoor /Mami Ji	Hindi		
2005	Kasshish		Hindi		
2008	Saath Saath Banayenge Ek Aashiyaan	Rekha Ranjeet Singh	Hindi		
2005-2011	Woh Rehne Waali Mehlon Ki	Sheena Jamnadas Thapar	Hindi		
