= Majesty Yachts =

Emirati yacht brand

Majesty Yachts is a brand of superyachts and yachts manufactured by Gulf Craft, a global manufacturer of luxury yachts and fiberglass boats, in the United Arab Emirates.

== History ==
The Majesty Yachts brand was launched in 2004. It has since been a brand for Gulf Craft, sold in major yachting markets such as Europe, Asia-Pacific and the Americas.

== Current fleet ==
The brand currently offers yachts and superyachts from 48 ft to 155 ft.
