= Gopi Kishan =

- Theatrical release Poster
- Directed by: Mukesh Duggal (Note: Deepak Shivdasani directed the film. However due to differences with the producer, he left the project and Duggal is credited as the director.)
- Written by: Anees Bazmee
- Based on: Avasara Police 100 by K. Bhagyaraj
- Produced by: Mukesh Duggal
- Starring: Sunil Shetty; Shilpa Shirodkar; Karishma Kapoor
- Cinematography: Akram Khan
- Edited by: A. Muthu
- Music by: Anand–Milind
- Release date: 2 December 1994
- Running time: 162 minutes
- Country: India
- Language: Hindi
- Budget: ₹2.15 crore
- Box office: ₹8 crore

Gopi Kishan is 1994 Indian Hindi-language action comedy film directed by Mukesh Duggal starring Sunil Shetty in dual roles, supported by Shilpa Shirodkar and Karishma Kapoor. Other cast includes Suresh Oberoi, Aruna Irani, Mohan Joshi, Shammi, Satyendra Kapoor and Mushtaq Khan. The film is a remake of K. Bhagyaraj's Tamil film Avasara Police 100.

== Plot ==
Kishan is a hardened criminal who returns home after completing 14 years' imprisonment for murder. Kishan had killed a man in his childhood, when the latter tried to molest his mother. Kishan thinks his father is dead, but he soon learns that his mother has kept the truth under wraps. He learns that his father Suraj Malhotra was a jeweller who killed his partner and ran away with precious jewels. She tells Kishan that she never saw Suraj after that, and now he is a dreaded gangster in the underworld.

Kishan decides to bring his father to justice for all his wrongdoings. He singles out Sawant, a powerful man of Suraj and decides to attack him. Meanwhile, Gopi, a doppelgänger of Kishan, works as a constable in the police force. Gopi has a doting mother, a wife and a kid, but isn't taken seriously as he lacks the guts to become anything worthwhile. Kishan spots Gopi and decides to use him for his purposes. Kishan starts bumping off the goons, while Gopi starts getting the credit.

Soon, Gopi's fortune changes, while Kishan succeeds in furthering his motives. Barkha (Karisma Kapoor), the Commissioner's daughter, falls in love with Kishan. One day, Kishan manages to sneak into Malhotra's lair. He holds Malhotra at gunpoint and shows him the photo of his mother. He learns that Sawant is the kingpin and Suraj the pawn, rather than the other way around. Suraj tells Kishan that Sawant's men killed Suraj's partner for the jewels. Suraj somehow scooted off with the money and hid it in the basement of a construction site.

Sawant caught Suraj and told him that the latter has been convicted for the former's crimes. Sawant also tells him that his wife has committed suicide and his son would be killed too, if Suraj does not tell the location of the jewels. Suraj does not tell the location, but to save the infant from death, takes the blame on himself. Upon this, Kishan reveals his identity. Both realise that Sawant passed some other child as Suraj's son. Kishan learns that the money was hidden in the police headquarters.

Kishan decides to retrieve the loot and Gopi starts hunting for Kishan. Meanwhile, Kishan has infuriated Sawant too by killing some of his goons. Kishan's mother, whom Kishan had left to find his father, comes to find him. She runs into Gopi, mistaking him for Kishan. Gopi tricks her and abducts her. But Gopi is in for a surprise when Kishan's mother and Gopi's mother turn out to be acquaintances.

Gopi's mother reveals that when Kishan's mother was in labour, she delivered twins. Gopi's mother was actually childless, so she took one of the boys. Gopi is in a quandary as he cannot arrest his newfound brother, but decides that he has to do this, one way or other. Meanwhile, Kishan has revealed the truth to Barkha, who agrees to help him in retrieving the score. Sawant succeeds in nabbing Kishan. Unable to see his son tortured, Suraj spills the beans.

Now, Gopi enters the den and pretends to be Kishan, claiming that Sawant has actually kidnapped the gullible Gopi. One by one, all the villains are unmasked. Suraj is delighted to meet his wife, while both Gopi and Kishan start bringing Sawant's empire to dust. After killing Sawant's son, which provides poetic justice in this case, all the goons are rounded off. Suraj is finally united with his family in the end.

== Cast ==
- Suniel Shetty in a dual role as:
  - Head Constable Gopinath "Gopi" Chaudhary; Geeta and Rajeshwar's elder son; Kishan's twin brother; Chanda's husband
  - Inspector Kishan Chaudhary: Geeta and Rajeshwar's younger son; Gopi's twin brother; Barkha's husband
- Shilpa Shirodkar as Chanda Choudhary; Gopi's wife
- Karishma Kapoor as Barkha Choudhary; Kishan's wife
- Aruna Irani as Geeta Choudhary; Kishan and Gopi's mother
- Suresh Oberoi as Rajeshwar Choudhary; Kishan and Gopi's father
- Mohan Joshi as Sawant
- Arun Bakshi as Corrupt Minister Rautulla Himayati
- Shammi as Janki
- Satyendra Kapoor as Police Commissioner
- Mushtaq Khan as Inspector Mishra
- Kishore Bhanushali as Police Constable
- Shiva Rindani as Sharad
- Vishwajeet Pradhan as Henchmen of Sawant
- Guddi Maruti as a friend of Barkha
- Imtiaz Khan as Retired Police Commissioner

== Soundtrack ==
Music by Anand–Milind and Lyrics by Sameer.

| # | Title | Singer(s) |
|---|---|---|
| 1 | "Yeh Ishq Hai Kya" | Kumar Sanu, Alka Yagnik |
| 2 | "Haye Hukku Haye Hukku Haaye Haaye" | Kumar Sanu, Poornima |
| 3 | "Chhatri Na Khol Barsaat Mein" | Kumar Sanu, Poornima |
| 4 | "Mera Mehboob Aayega" | Arun Bakshi, Poornima |
| 5 | "I Love You" | Kumar Sanu, Alka Yagnik |
| 6 | "Batti Na Bujha" | Poornima |
