= Suniel Shetty =

Indian actor (born 1961)

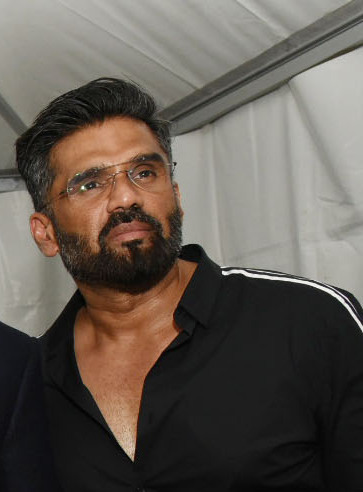
- Shetty in 2018
- Born: Sunil Shetty; 11 August 1961 (age 65); Mulki, Mysore State, India
- Other name: Anna (nickname)
- Occupations: Actor; television personality; entrepreneur; film producer
- Years active: 1992–present
- Organization: Popcorn Entertainment Pvt. Ltd.
- Works: Full list
- Spouse: Monisha Kadri (m. 1991)
- Children: Athiya Shetty (daughter); Ahan Shetty (son)
- Relatives: KL Rahul (son-in-law)

Suniel Veerappa Shetty (born Sunil Shetty; 11 August 1961) is an Indian actor, film producer, television host, and entrepreneur, primarily known for his work in Hindi cinema. Nicknamed as Anna, Shetty has appeared in over 100 films since the 1990s and is known for his various supporting and leading action and comedy roles.

Rising to prominence in the 1990s as a leading action hero with films like Balwaan (1992), Waqt Hamara Hai (1993), Mohra (1994), Dilwale (1994), and Border (1997), and known for performing his own stunts in all his action movies, Shetty later showcased his versatility in comedies such as Hera Pheri (2000), Phir Hera Pheri (2006) and antagonistic roles, notably winning a Filmfare Award for Best Villain for Dhadkan (2000). Beyond acting, he has produced films under Popcorn Motion Pictures, co-founded the online casting platform F...the Couch (FTC), and hosted reality shows.

== Early life ==
Sunil Shetty was born on 11 August 1961 in Mulki, Mysore State, into a Tulu-speaking Bunt family. His father, Veerappa Shetty, worked as a waiter in a restaurant before managing his own restaurant business in Mumbai. Shetty did his early schooling at the Lawrence School, Sanawar in Himachal Pradesh. He later earned a degree in commerce from H.R. College of Commerce and Economics in Mumbai. During his youth, Shetty developed an interest in sports, particularly cricket and martial arts, achieving a black belt in kickboxing. Before entering the film industry, he briefly assisted his father in the family's restaurant business and was involved in managing Udupi-style eateries in Mumbai.

== Film career ==
Shetty began his Hindi film career with the 1992 action film Balwaan opposite Divya Bharti, which was a moderate success. He rose to prominence in 1994 with the blockbuster Mohra and the action-comedy Gopi Kishan, where he played a dual role. During the 1990s, he was one of the highest-paid actors in Hindi cinema, appearing in leading and co-leading roles, particularly in action films such as Waqt Hamara Hai (1993), Anth (1994), Dilwale (1994), Krishna (1996), Border (1997), where he played Captain Bhairon Singh, and Vinashak (1998). His role in Dhadkan (2000) as the anti-hero obsessive lover earned him a Zee Cine Best Supporting Actor Award.

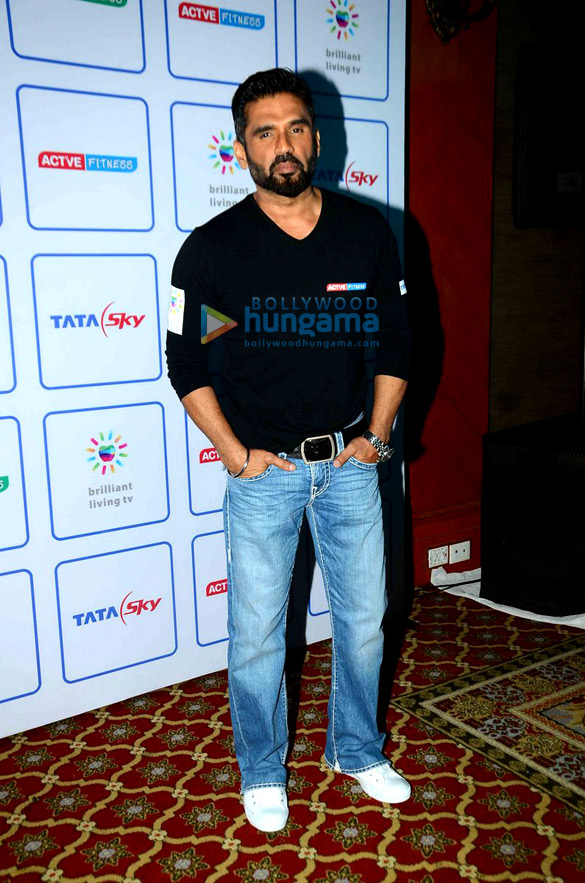
Shetty in 2015 at Tata Sky Health and Fitness

From the early 2000s, Shetty shifted to multi-starrer films across genres. He starred opposite Isha Koppikar in Arjun Rampal's debut film Pyaar Ishq Aur Mohabbat (2001) and ventured into comedy with the 2000 cult classic Hera Pheri, followed by Yeh Teraa Ghar Yeh Meraa Ghar (2001), Awara Paagal Deewana (2002), Phir Hera Pheri (2006), One Two Three (2008), and De Dana Dan (2009). He played negative roles in Dhadkan (2000), winning a Filmfare Award for Best Villain in 2001, Khel – No Ordinary Game (2003), Baaz: A Bird in Danger (2003), Main Hoon Na (2004), Rudraksh (2004), No Problem (2010), and A Gentleman (2017). He also took on patriotic roles in Border (1997) and LOC: Kargil (2003). In 2009, he won the South Asian International Film Festival's Best Actor Award for his role in the Naxalite-based film Red Alert: The War Within (2009).

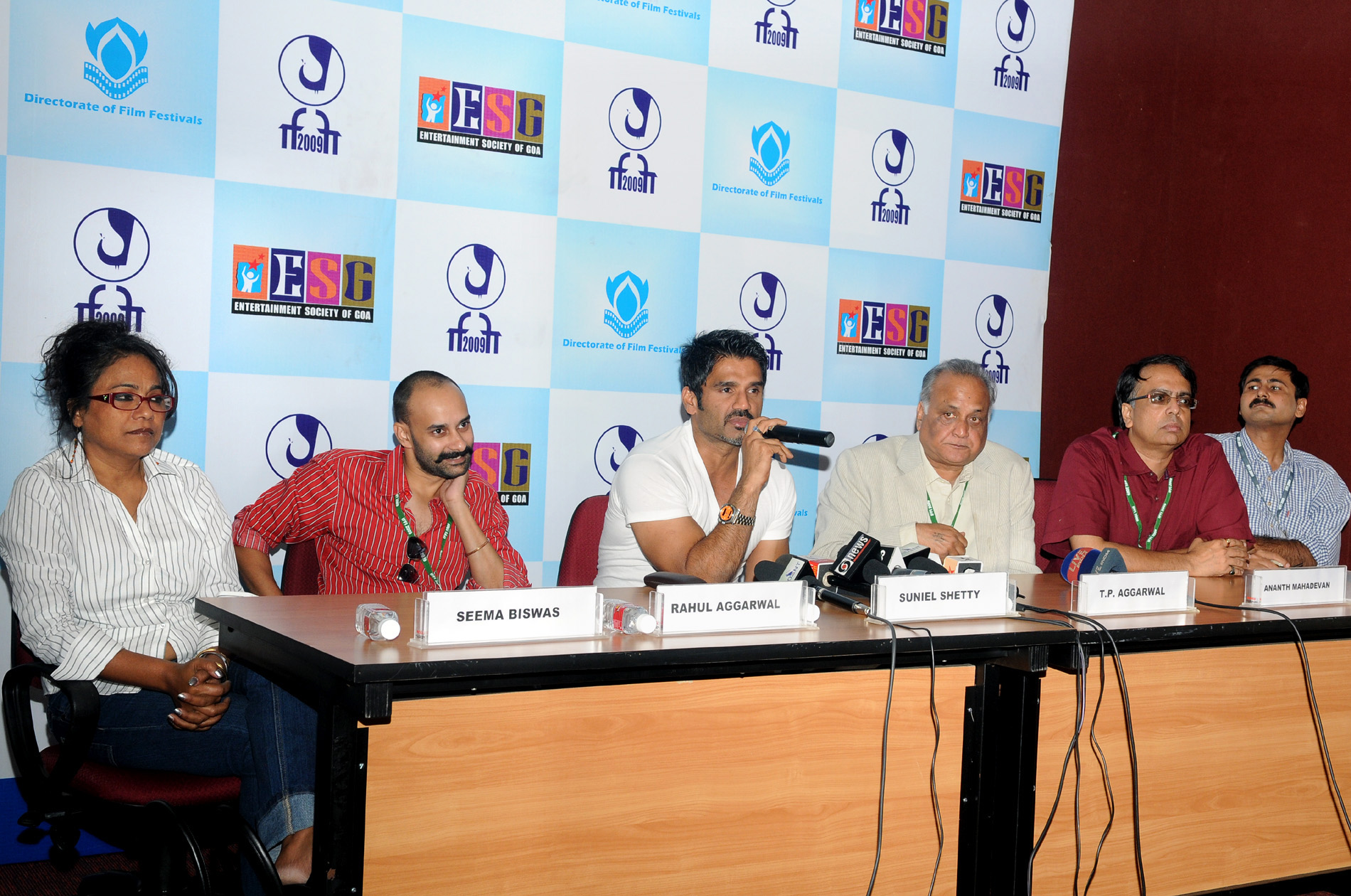
Shetty during the 40th International Film Festival in 2009

Shetty debuted in Tamil cinema with 12B (2001) and returned to Tamil films after 18 years with Darbar (2020) alongside Rajinikanth. In 2021, he appeared in Sanjay Gupta's gangster drama Mumbai Saga. In 2023, he portrayed ACP Vikram Chauhan in the action thriller web series Hunter Tootega Nahi Todega, set in Mumbai's crime world. His most recent film appearance was in Nadaaniyan (2025), Kesari Veer (2025), with upcoming projects including Welcome to the Jungle (2025).

In 2014, Shetty changed the spelling of his name from Sunil to Suniel for numerological reasons. He produced films under Popcorn Motion Pictures, including Khel – No Ordinary Game (2003), Rakht (2004), and Bhagam Bhag (2006). He co-founded F...the Couch (FTC) with Mukesh Chhabra, an online platform to discover new Bollywood talent. Shetty hosted reality shows like Biggest Loser Jeetega (2007) on Sahara One and India’s Asli Champion Hai Dam? on &TV. He participated in the Celebrity Cricket League as captain of the Mumbai Heroes and co-founded the Ferit Cricket Bash in 2018. In 2014 and 2016, he was a special guest at the Hiru Golden Film Awards in Sri Lanka. In 2005, on the eve of the former Prime Minister Rajiv Gandhi's 61st birth anniversary, the Mumbai Pradesh Youth Congress honoured Shetty with the Rajiv Gandhi National Quality Award.

== Other work ==
In 2019, Shetty invested in the Pune-based online health and fitness start up Squats.

=== Television ===
Shetty has appeared as a host for the fitness reality shows Biggest Loser Jeetega on Sahara One. and India's Asli Champion Hai dam? on &TV.

=== Restaurant ===
The actor owns Mischief Dining Bar and Club H2O, in Mumbai. Both the places are running successfully. He co-owns the water adventure park attached to cafe H2O. He closed down Mischief Bar in 2010, and instead opened a new restaurant called Little Italy. The restaurant was first owned by his father when it was an Udupi restaurant, Suniel then changed the restaurant into a bar, and then back into a restaurant with the different name with his father's blessings.

=== Celebrity Cricket League ===
Suniel Shetty is captain of the Mumbai Heroes cricket team in the Celebrity Cricket League. He is also the co-founder of Ferit Cricket Bash that was launched in December 2018.

=== Hiru Golden Film Awards ===
Suniel Shetty was participant in the Hiru Golden Film Awards 2014 and 2016 in Sri Lanka as a special guest.

=== R House ===
He started his luxury furniture and home lifestyle store in Mumbai, Worli in 2013 with his wife Mana.

=== Brand ambassador ===
Shetty is the brand ambassador of HYPE Luxury, a luxury mobility platform that offers luxury cars, yachts, and private jets for rent.

=== Philanthropy ===
Suniel Shetty is involved in a number of Philanthropic initiatives. He is an advisor for Vipla Foundation, an NGO that works towards empowering underprivileged communities through education, skill development, and social welfare initiatives to create sustainable and inclusive growth.

In 2008, he contributed in the rescue of 128 Nepalese women from sex trafficking in Mumbai, and arranged for their return to Nepal. He has credited Mumbai police officials for the successful rescue.

== Personal life ==
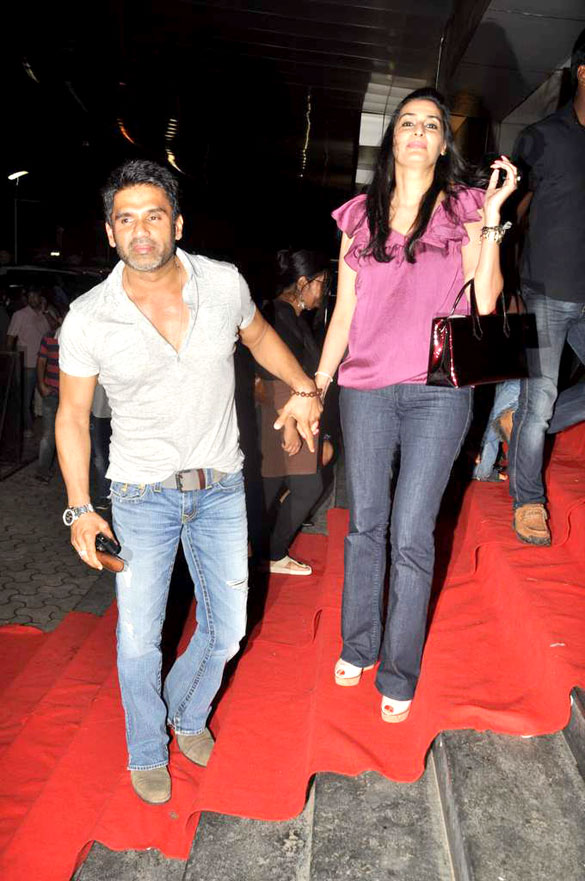
Shetty with his wife at the premiere of Bol Bachchan in 2011

Since 1991 he is married to Mana Shetty (née Monisha Kadri), a businesswoman, designer and social activist born to a Gujarati Muslim architect father and a Punjabi Hindu social activist mother. They have two children, a daughter Athiya Shetty and a son Ahan Shetty.

Both Athiya and Ahan have made their acting debuts respectively, Athiya in the film Hero (2015) and Ahan in Sajid Nadiadwala's film Tadap (2021), the Hindi remake of Telugu film RX 100. Mana runs an NGO for under-privileged kids. Athiya married Indian cricketer KL Rahul on 23 January 2023.

Shetty has a black belt in kickboxing. He owns clothing boutiques as well as restaurants specialising in Udupi cuisine.

== Accolades ==
Winner

- 2001: Filmfare Award for Best Villain for Dhadkan
- 2001: Zee Cine Award for Best Supporting Actor for Dhadkan
- 2005: GIFA Award for Best Villain for Main Hoon Na
- 2011: Stardust Award for Best Actor (Critics) for Red Alert: The War Within

Nominated

- 1995: Filmfare Award for Best Supporting Actor for Dilwale
- 1998: Filmfare Award for Best Supporting Actor for Border
- 1998: Screen Award for Best Supporting Actor for Border
- 2001: Filmfare Award for Best Supporting Actor for Refugee
- 2001: IIFA Award for Best Supporting Actor for Refugee
- 2001: IIFA Award for Best Villain for Dhadkan
- 2004: IIFA Award for Best Supporting Actor for Qayamat: City Under Threat
- 2005: Filmfare Award for Best Villain for Main Hoon Na
- 2005: IIFA Award for Best Villain for Main Hoon Na
- 2021: SIIMA Award for Best Actor in a Negative Role – Tamil for Darbar
