= List of Hindi films of 2000 =

This is a list of Hindi films that were released in 2000.

== Box office collection ==
The highest-grossing Hindi films released in 2000, by worldwide box office gross revenue, are as follows.

Rank	Title	Director	Producers	Worldwide gross
1	Kaho Naa... Pyaar Hai	Rakesh Roshan	Rakesh Roshan	₹80.01 crore
2	Mohabbatein	Aditya Chopra	Yash Chopra	₹76.91 crore
3	Mission Kashmir	Vidhu Vinod Chopra	Vidhu Vinod Chopra	₹43.30 crore
4	Dulhan Hum Le Jayenge	David Dhawan	Gordhan Tanwani	₹36.87 crore
5	Refugee	J. P. Dutta	J. P. Dutta	₹35.44 crore
6	Josh	Mansoor Khan	Ganesh Jain, Ratan Jain Champak Jain	₹35.06 crore
7	Har Dil Jo Pyar Karega	Raj Kanwar	Sajid Nadiadwala	₹32.45 crore
8	Fiza	Khalid Mohammed	Pradeep Guha	₹32.20 crore
9	Hamara Dil Aapke Paas Hai	Satish Kaushik	Surinder Kapoor, Boney Kapoor	₹30.26 crore
10	Mela	Dharmesh Darshan	Ganesh Jain	₹25 crore

== January to April ==
=== January ===
Bulandi (January 7)

Mela (January 7)

Kaho Naa… Pyaar Hai (January 14)

Phir Bhi Dil Hai Hindustani (January 21)

=== February ===
Pukar (February 4)

Astitva (February 6)

Badal (February 11)

Apradhi Koun (February 12)

Hey Ram (February 18)

Tune Mera Dil Le Liyaa (February 23)

=== March ===
Le Chal Apne Sang (March 2)

Khauff (March 3)

Krodh (March 17)

Sultaan (March 17)

Dulhan Hum Le Jayenge (March 24)

Hera Pheri (March 31)

=== April ===
Baaghi (April 12)

Gang (April 14)

Hadh Kar Di Aapne (April 14)

== May to August ==
=== May ===
Chal Mere Bhai (May 5)

Jung (May 12)

Kharidaar (May 16)

Kya Kehna (May 19)

Hum To Mohabbat Karega (May 26)

=== June ===
Josh (June 9)

Joru Ka Ghulam (June 16)

Tarkieb (June 23)

Refugee (June 30)

=== July ===
Bichhoo (July 7)

Jungle (July 14)

Kunwara (July 21)

Nidaan (July 28)

Papa the Great (July 28)

=== August ===
Har Dil Jo Pyar Karega (August 4)

Deewane (August 11)

Dhadkan (August 11)

Tera Jadoo Chal Gayaa (August 18)

Hamara Dil Aapke Paas Hai (August 25)

== September to December ==
=== September ===
Tapish (September 1)

Fiza (September 8)

Karobaar (September 15)

Meri Jung Ka Elaan (September 22)

Aaj Ka Ravan (September 29)

Dhaai Akshar Prem Ke (September 29)

Dil Pe Mat Le Yaar!! (September 29)

=== October ===
Aaghaaz (October 6)

Shikari (October 6)

Jis Desh Mein Ganga Rehta Hai (October 13)

Mission Kashmir (October 27)

Mohabbatein (October 27)

=== November ===
Beti No. 1 (November 10)

Kurukshetra (November 10)

Bawandar (November 17)

Kahin Pyaar Na Ho Jaaye (November 17)

Anjaane (November 21)

=== December ===
Gaja Gamini (December 1)

Ghaath (December 8)

Dr. Babasaheb Ambedkar (December 15)

Bhai Thakur (December 8)

Champion (December 22)

Jallad No. 1 (December 22)

Raja Ko Rani Se Pyar Ho Gaya (December 22)

Billa No. 786 (December 29)

Khiladi 420 (December 29)

Raju Chacha (December 29)

== Films with an unknown release date ==
The following films are not known to have a release date.

Anokha Moti

Bas Yaari Rakho

Dil Ki Dhadkan

Dr. Mukta

Hari-Bhari

Pandavas: The Five Warriors

The Revenge: Geeta Mera Naam

Shikaar

Snip!

Zindagi Zindabad

== List of released films (A-Z) ==
The list of Hindi films (in alphabetical order) that were released in 2000 are as follows.

Title	Director	Cast	Genre	Music director
Aaghaaz	Yogesh Ishwar	Sunil Shetty, Sushmita Sen, Namrata Shirodkar	Thriller	Anu Malik
Aaj Ka Ravan	Imran Khalid	Kasam Ali, Mithun Chakraborty	Drama	Pappu Pawan
Anjaane	Ravi Rai	Raveena Tandon, Vivek Mushran	Romance	Rajesh Roshan
Anokha Moti	Anshul Singla	Sanjay Sharma, Arjun Chakraborty, Nayab Aftab	Family	
Apradhi Kaun	Mohan Bhakri	Ishrat Ali, Shagufta Ali	Thriller	
Astitva	Mahesh Manjrekar	Tabu, Sachin Khedekar, Smita Jaykar, Mohnish Bahl	Drama, Social	Sukhwinder Singh
Baaghi	Rajesh Kumar Singh	Sanjay Dutt, Manisha Koirala, Aditya Pancholi, Mahesh Anand, Inder Kumar	Action	Sajid–Wajid
Badal	Raj Kanwar	Bobby Deol, Rani Mukerji, Johnny Lever	Action, Drama	Anu Malik
Bas Yaari Rakho	Gopi Desai	Pooja Batra, Seema Biswas	Comedy, Drama	
Bawandar	Jag Mundhra	Nandita Das, Rahul Khanna	Drama	
Beti No.1	T. Rama Rao	Govinda, Rambha	Comedy	Viju Shah
Bhai Thakur	Willy, Raja	Dharmendra, Shakti Kapoor, Upasna Singh	Action	
Bichhoo	Guddu Dhanoa	Bobby Deol, Rani Mukerji, Malaika Arora	Action	Anand Raj Anand
Billa No. 786	Imran Khalid	Mithun Chakraborty	Action	Anand-Milind
Bulandi	T. Rama Rao	Rajinikanth, Rekha, Anil Kapoor, Raveena Tandon	Drama	Viju Shah
Chal Mere Bhai	David Dhawan	Sanjay Dutt, Salman Khan, Karisma Kapoor, Twinkle Khanna, Sonali Bendre, Shakti Kapoor, Dalip Tahil	Comedy	Anand-Milind
Champion	Padam Kumar	Sunny Deol, Manisha Koirala	Action, Drama	Anu Malik
Deewane	Harry Baweja	Ajay Devgn, Urmila Matondkar, Mahima Chaudhry	Action, Romance	Sanjeev-Darshan
Dhai Akshar Prem Ke	Raj Kanwar	Abhishek Bachchan, Aishwarya Rai, Salman Khan, Amrish Puri, Sonali Bendre, Dalip Tahil	Romance, Drama	Jatin-Lalit
Dhadkan	Dharmesh Darshan	Akshay Kumar, Sunil Shetty, Shilpa Shetty	Romance, Drama	Nadeem-Shravan
Dil Ki Dhadkan		Rambha		
Dil Pe Mat Le Yaar	Hansal Mehta	Manoj Bajpai, Tabu, Gajraj Rao, Vijay Raaz, Aditya Srivastava, Kashmera Shah	Drama	Vishal Bhardwaj
Dr. Babasaheb Ambedkar	Jabbar Patel	Mammootty, Sonali Kulkarni		
Dr Mukta		Amar Babaria, Jaya Bachchan, Abhay Chandarana		
Dulhan Hum Le Jayenge	David Dhawan	Salman Khan, Karisma Kapoor, Johnny Lever, Deepak Tijori, Kader Khan	Comedy, Romance	Himesh Reshammiya
Fiza	Khalid Mohammed	Jaya Bachchan, Karisma Kapoor, Hrithik Roshan, Neha	Drama, Family, Thriller	Anu Malik
Gaja Gamini	M. F. Hussain	Madhuri Dixit, Shabana Azmi, Shilpa Shirodkar, Naseeruddin Shah, Shah Rukh Khan	Drama	
Gang	Mazhar Khan	Juhi Chawla, Nana Patekar, Jackie Shroff	Crime	Anu Malik
Ghaath	Akashdeep	Tabu, Manoj Bajpai, Arshad Warsi	Drama	Anu Malik
Hadh Kar Di Aapne	Manoj Agrawal	Govinda, Rani Mukerji	Comedy, Romance	Anand Raj Anand
Hamara Dil Aapke Paas Hai	Satish Kaushik	Anil Kapoor, Aishwarya Rai, Sonali Bendre	Drama	Sanjeev-Darshan
Har Dil Jo Pyar Karega	Raj Kanwar	Salman Khan, Preity Zinta, Rani Mukerji, Shah Rukh Khan	Comedy, Drama, Romance	Anu Malik
Hari-Bhari	Shyam Benegal	Shabana Azmi, Rajit Kapur, Rajeshwari Sachdev, Surekha Sikri, Nandita Das	Drama	
Hera Pheri	Priyadarshan	Akshay Kumar, Suniel Shetty, Tabu, Paresh Rawal	Comedy	Anu Malik
Hey Ram	Kamal Haasan	Kamal Haasan, Shah Rukh Khan, Rani Mukerji, Vasundhara Das, Hema Malini, Girish Karnad, Om Puri	Drama	Ilaiyaraaja
Hum To Mohabbat Karega	Kundan Shah	Bobby Deol, Karisma Kapoor	Action, Romance	Anu Malik
Jallad No. 1	Kanti Shah	Dharmendra	Drama	
Jis Desh Mein Ganga Rehta Hain	Mahesh Manjrekar	Govinda, Sonali Bendre, Rinke Khanna, Shakti Kapoor	Drama	Anand Raj Anand
Joru Ka Ghulam	Shakeel Noorani	Govinda, Twinkle Khanna, Kader Khan, Johnny Lever, Ali Asgar	Drama	Aadesh Shrivastav
Josh	Mansoor Khan	Shah Rukh Khan, Chandrachur Singh, Aishwarya Rai, Priya Gill, Sharad Kapoor	Action, Romance	Anu Malik
Jung	Sanjay Gupta	Sanjay Dutt, Shilpa Shetty, Raveena Tandon, Jackie Shroff	Drama	Anu Malik
Jungle	Ram Gopal Verma	Himanshu Malik, Urmila Matondkar, Fardeen Khan, Nawazuddin Siddiqui, Sunil Shetty	Romance	Sandeep Chowta
Kabrastan	Ramesh U. Lakhiani		Horror	
Kahin Pyaar Na Ho Jaaye	K. Muralimohana Rao	Salman Khan, Rani Mukerji, Jackie Shroff, Raveena Tandon, Pooja Batra	Comedy, Romance	Himesh Reshammiya
Kaho Naa... Pyaar Hai	Rakesh Roshan	Hrithik Roshan, Amisha Patel, Mohnish Bahl, Anupam Kher	Romance, Drama, Musical, Thriller	Rajesh Roshan
Kairee	Amol Palekar	Atul Kulkarni, Yogita Deshmukh, Shilpa Navalkar	Drama	
Karobaar: The Business of Love	Rakesh Roshan	Rishi Kapoor, Anil Kapoor, Juhi Chawla	Drama	Rajesh Roshan
Kharidaar	Papu Bahruz	Kishore Anand Bhanushali, Mushtaq Khan, Anil Nagrath, Amit Pachori		
Khauff	Sanjay Gupta	Sanjay Dutt, Manisha Koirala, Simran Bagga	Drama	Anu Malik
Khiladi 420	Neeraj Vora	Akshay Kumar, Mahima Chaudhry, Antara Mali	Action, Romance	Sanjeev-Darshan
Krodh	Ashok Honda	Suniel Shetty, Rambha	Action	Anand-Milind
Kunwara	David Dhawan	Govinda, Urmila Matondkar	Comedy	Aadesh Shrivastva
Kurukshetra	Mahesh Manjrekar	Sanjay Dutt, Mahima Chaudhry	Action, Romance	Himesh Reshammiya
Kya Kehna	Kundan Shah	Saif Ali Khan, Preity Zinta, Puneet Vashisht, Chandrachur Singh, Farida Jalal, Anupam Kher	Romance, Drama	Rajesh Roshan
Le Chal Apne Sang	Vijay Kondke	Nishanth, Alok Nath, Beena Banerjee	Romance	
Lekroo	Shrabani Deodhar	Sania Jhankar, Nimish Kathale, Sachin Khedekar, Mrinal Kulkarni		
Mela	Dharmesh Darshan	Aamir Khan, Twinkle Khanna, Faisal Khan, Aishwarya Rai, Johny Lever	Drama	Anu Malik
Meri Jung Ka Elaan	Kanti Shah	Dharmendra	Drama	
Mission Kashmir	Vidhu Vinod Chopra	Sanjay Dutt, Hrithik Roshan, Preity Zinta, Jackie Shroff, Puru Raaj Kumar, Sonali Kulkarni, Vineet Sharma, Ashok Banthia	Drama, War, Thriller	Shankar-Ehsaan-Loy
Mohabbatein	Aditya Chopra	Amitabh Bachchan, Shah Rukh Khan, Aishwarya Rai, Uday Chopra, Shamita Shetty, Jugal Hansraj, Kim Sharma, Jimmy Sheirgill, Preeti Jhangiani	Drama, Romance, Musical, Family	Jatin–Lalit
Nidaan	Mahesh Manjrekar	Shivaji Satam, Reema Lagoo, Nisha Bains, Sunil Barve	Drama	
Pandavas: The Five Warriors	Usha Ganesh Raja		Animation	Ilaiyaraaja
Papa the Great	K. Bhagyaraj	Krishna Kumar, Nagma	Family	Nikhil-Vinay
Phir Bhi Dil Hai Hindustani	Aziz Mirza	Shah Rukh Khan, Juhi Chawla, Paresh Rawal, Johny Lever, Dalip Tahil, Satish Shah, Sharat Saxena	Comedy, Drama, Romance, Musical	Jatin–Lalit
Pukar	Rajkumar Santoshi	Anil Kapoor, Madhuri Dixit, Namrata Shirodkar, Danny Denzongpa	Drama	A. R. Rahman
Raja Ko Rani Se Pyar Ho Gaya	T.K. Rajeev Kumar	Manisha Koirala, Arvind Swamy	Comedy, Musical	Jatin-Lalit
Raju Chacha	Anil Devgan	Ajay Devgn, Kajol, Johnny Lever, Rishi Kapoor, Sanjay Dutt, Tiku Talsania	Comedy	Jatin–Lalit
Refugee	J. P. Dutta	Abhishek Bachchan, Kareena Kapoor, Sunil Shetty, Jackie Shroff, Anupam Kher	Drama, Romance	Anu Malik
The Revenge: Geeta Mera Naam	Dilip Gulati	Birbal, Dharmendra, Jack Gaud	Action	
Saanjh	Sabrina Dhawan	Nandita Das, Sharda Desoares, Arjun Raina, Rahul Vohra		
Second Generation				
Shikaar	Bobby Raj	Abhishek Kapoor, Vikas Bhalla, Ayesha Jhulka, Anupam Kher		
Shikari	N. Chandra	Govinda, Karisma Kapoor, Tabu	Thriller, Action, Romance	Aadesh Shrivastva
Snip!	Sunil Sippy	Sohrab Ardeshir, Nikhil Chinappa, Makrand Deshpande, Vekeana Dhillon		
Sultaan		Vikas Anand	Action	
Tapish	Jay Prakash	Tara Deshpande, Ellora Patnaik, Parvin Dabas, Gajendra Chouhan		
Tarkieb	Esmayeel Shroff	Milind Soman, Nana Patekar, Tabu, Shilpa Shetty	Suspense, Thriller	Aadesh Shrivastva
Tera Jadoo Chal Gayaa	A. Muthu	Abhishek Bachchan, Kirti Reddy, Sanjay Suri, Kader Khan	Romance	Ismail Darbar
Tune Mera Dil Le Liyaa	B.B. Bhalla	Raveena Tandon, Naseeruddin Shah, Rahul Roy, Shakti Kapoor		
Zindagi Zindabad	Sumitra Bhave–Sunil Sukthankar	Mita Vasisht, Milind Gunaji, Uttara Baokar, Abhiram Bhadkamkar		

== See also ==
- List of Hindi films of 2001
- List of Hindi films of 1999
