= 7th Screen Awards =

Awards for Hindi-language films of 2000

- Date: 20 January 2001
- Site: Andheri Sports Complex, Mumbai
- Hosted by: Rahul Khanna

Highlights
- Best Picture: Kaho Naa... Pyaar Hai
- Best Direction: Rakesh Roshan (Kaho Naa... Pyaar Hai)
- Best Actor: Hrithik Roshan (Kaho Naa... Pyaar Hai)
- Best Actress: Tabu (Astitva)
- Most awards: Kaho Naa... Pyaar Hai (9)
- Most nominations: Kaho Naa... Pyaar Hai (17)

Television coverage
- Channel: DD National; Sahara TV
- Network: Doordarshan; Sahara India Pariwar

The 7th Screen Awards also The Seventh Annual Screen–Videocon Awards ceremony, presented by Indian Express Group, honored the best Indian Hindi-language films of 2000. The ceremony was held on 20 January 2001 at Andheri Sports Complex, Mumbai, and hosted by Rahul Khanna and co-hosted by Sonali Bendre, Aditi Govitrikar and Nafisa Joseph. The event was telecasted on DD National and Sahara TV on 21 January 2001.

Kaho Naa... Pyaar Hai led the ceremony with 17 nominations, followed by Mission Kashmir with 14 nominations and Mohabbatein with 11 nominations.

Kaho Naa... Pyaar Hai won 9 awards, including Best Film, Best Director (for Rakesh Roshan) and Best Actor (for Hrithik Roshan), thus becoming the most-awarded film at the ceremony.

== Awards ==
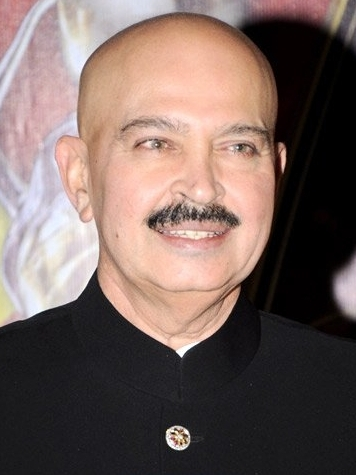
Rakesh Roshan — Best Director winner for Kaho Naa... Pyaar Hai

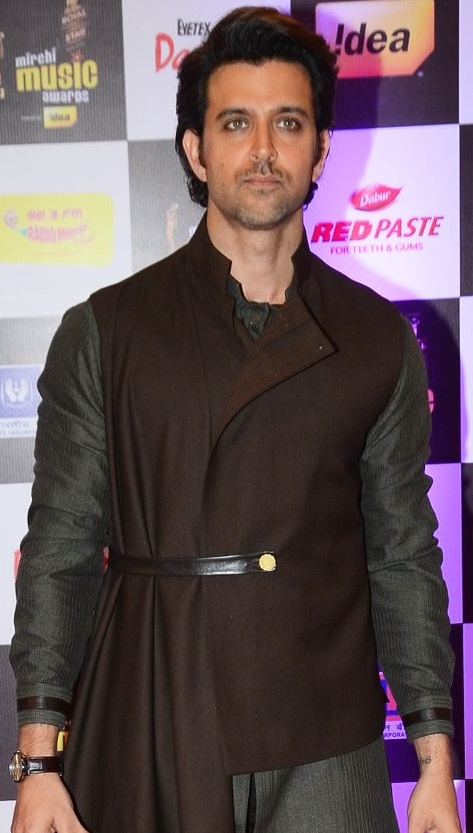
Hrithik Roshan — Best Actor winner for Kaho Naa... Pyaar Hai

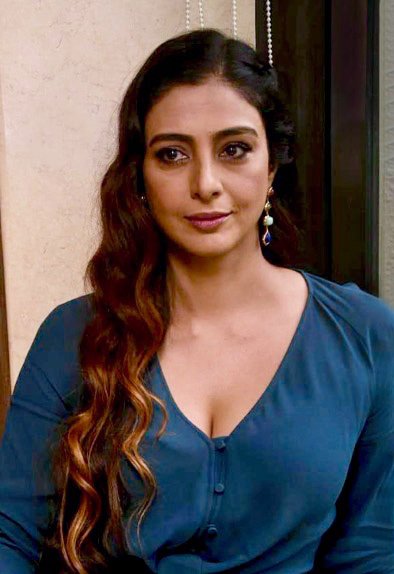
Tabu — Best Actress winner for Astitva

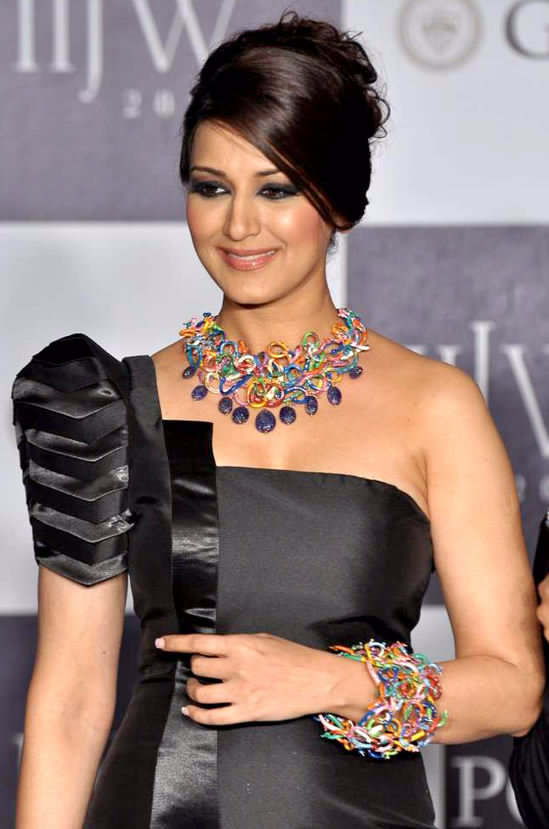
Sonali Bendre — Best Supporting Actress winner for Hamara Dil Aapke Paas Hai

The winners and nominees have been listed below. Winners are listed first, highlighted in boldface, and indicated with a double dagger (‡).

=== Jury Awards ===
Best Film	Best Director
**Kaho Naa... Pyaar Hai**‡; Astitva; Josh; Mission Kashmir; Mohabbatein	**Rakesh Roshan – Kaho Naa... Pyaar Hai**‡; Aditya Chopra – Mohabbatein; Mansoor Khan – Josh; Ram Gopal Varma – Jungle; Vidhu Vinod Chopra – Mission Kashmir
Best Actor	Best Actress
**Hrithik Roshan – Kaho Naa... Pyaar Hai**‡; Anil Kapoor – Pukar; Kamal Haasan – Hey Ram; Sanjay Dutt – Kurukshetra; Shah Rukh Khan – Mohabbatein	**Tabu – Astitva**‡; Aishwarya Rai Bachchan – Hamara Dil Aapke Paas Hai; Karisma Kapoor – Fiza; Madhuri Dixit – Pukar; Preity Zinta – Kya Kehna
Best Supporting Actor	Best Supporting Actress
**Sanjay Dutt – Mission Kashmir**‡; Amitabh Bachchan – Mohabbatein; Atul Kulkarni – Hey Ram; Sharad Kapoor – Josh; Shivaji Satam – Nidaan	**Sonali Bendre – Hamara Dil Aapke Paas Hai**‡; Mahima Chaudhry – Dhadkan; Reema Lagoo – Nidaan; Shilpa Navalkar – Kairee; Sonali Kulkarni – Mission Kashmir
Best Actor in a Negative Role – Male / Female	Best Actor in a Comic Role – Male / Female
**Rajpal Yadav** – **Jungle**‡; Govinda – Shikari; Kashmera Shah – Jungle; Puru Raaj Kumar – Hamara Dil Aapke Paas Hai; Rahul Dev – Champion	**Paresh Rawal** – **Hera Pheri**‡; Johnny Lever – Phir Bhi Dil Hai Hindustani; Om Puri – Hera Pheri; Rohini Hattangadi – Pukar; Vrajesh Hirjee – Kaho Naa... Pyaar Hai
Most Promising Newcomer – Male	Most Promising Newcomer – Female
**Hrithik Roshan – Kaho Naa... Pyaar Hai**‡; Abhishek Bachchan – Refugee; Bikram Saluja – Fiza; Rahul Dev – Champion; Uday Chopra – Mohabbatein	**Shilpa Navalkar – Kairee**‡; Ameesha Patel – Kaho Naa... Pyaar Hai; Kareena Kapoor – Refugee; Nisha Bains – Nidaan; Vasundhara Das – Hey Ram
Best Music Director	Best Lyricist
**Rajesh Roshan – Kaho Naa... Pyaar Hai**‡; Anu Malik – Fiza; Anu Malik – Josh; Jatin–Lalit – Mohabbatein; Nadeem–Shravan – Dhadkan	**Anand Bakshi – "Humko Humise Chura Lo" – Mohabbatein**‡; Gulzar – "Tu Fiza Hai" – Fiza; Javed Akhtar – "Panchi Nadiya Pawan Ke" – Refugee; Ibrahim Ashk – "Na Tum Jano Na Hum" – Kaho Naa... Pyaar Hai; Sameer Anjaan – "Dil Ne Yeh Kaha Hain Dil Se" – Dhadkan
Best Male Playback Singer	Best Female Playback Singer
**Lucky Ali – "Ek Pal Ka Jeena" – Kaho Naa... Pyaar Hai**‡; Abhijeet Bhattacharya – "Tum Dil Ki Dhadkan Mein" – Dhadkan; Sonu Nigam – "Panchi Nadiya Pawan Ke" – Refugee; Udit Narayan – "Dil Ne Yeh Kaha Hain Dil Se" – Dhadkan; Udit Narayan – "Aaja Mahiya" – Fiza	**Alka Yagnik – "Panchi Nadiya Pawan Ke" – Refugee**‡; Alka Yagnik – "Dil Ne Yeh Kaha Hain Dil Se" – Dhadkan; Alka Yagnik – "Kaho Naa Pyaar Hai" – Kaho Naa... Pyaar Hai; Kavita Krishnamurti – "Kay Sera Sera" – Pukar; Sunidhi Chauhan – "Bumbro" – Mission Kashmir

=== Technical Awards ===
Best Story	Best Screenplay
**Mahesh Manjrekar** – **Astitva**‡; Anand Vardhan – Hera Pheri; G. A. Kulkarni – Kairee; Honey Irani – Kya Kehna; Mahesh Manjrekar – Nidaan	**Honey Irani, Ravi Kapoor – Kaho Naa... Pyaar Hai**‡; Jaideep Sahni – Jungle; Mahesh Manjrekar – Astitva; Neeraj Vora – Hera Pheri; Neeraj Vora, Uttam Gada – Khiladi 420
Best Dialogue	Best Cinematography
**Neeraj Vora** – **Hera Pheri**‡; Aditya Chopra – Mohabbatein; Atul Tiwari – Mission Kashmir; Imtiyaz Husain – Astitva; Sagar Sarhadi – Kaho Naa... Pyaar Hai	**Binod Pradhan** – **Mission Kashmir**‡; K. V. Anand – Josh; Manmohan Singh – Mohabbatein; Santosh Sivan – Fiza; Tirru – Hey Ram
Best Editing	Best Background Music
**Sanjay Verma – Kaho Naa... Pyaar Hai**‡; Chandan Arora – Jungle; Mohammed Ashfaque – Khiladi 420; N. Gopalakrishnan – Hera Pheri; Zaffar Sultan – Josh	**Ilaiyaraaja** – **Hey Ram**‡; Bhaskar Chandavarkar – Kairee; Rajesh Roshan – Kaho Naa... Pyaar Hai; Sandeep Chowta – Jungle; Shankar–Ehsaan–Loy – Mission Kashmir
Best Art Direction	Best Choreography
**Nitin Chandrakant Desai** – **Josh**‡; Nitin Chandrakant Desai – Mission Kashmir; Nitin Chandrakant Desai – Raju Chacha; Sabu Cyril – Hey Ram; Sharmishta Roy – Mohabbatein	**Farah Khan – "Ek Pal Ka Jeena" – Kaho Naa... Pyaar Hai**‡; Farah Khan – "Pairon Mein Bandhan Hai" – Mohabbatein; Ganesh Hegde – "Mehboob Mere" – Fiza; Prabhu Deva – "Kay Sera Sera" – Pukar; Saroj Khan – "Bumbro" – Mission Kashmir
Best Sound Recording	Best Action Director
**Mike Dawson, Jitendra Chaudhary, Shantanu Hudlikar &** **Manoj Sikka** – **Mission Kashmir**‡; Deepan Chatterjee & Manohar Bangera – Josh; Jitendra Chaudhary – Kaho Naa... Pyaar Hai; Shridhar – Jungle; Shrivastav – Hey Ram	**Allan Amin** – **Mission Kashmir**‡; Abbas Ali – Josh; Amin Gani – Jungle; Jai Singh Nijjar – Raju Chacha; Mohammed Ashfaque – Khiladi 420
Best Special Effects	Best Publicity Design
**Raju Chacha**‡; Hey Ram; Kaho Naa... Pyaar Hai; Mission Kashmir; Phir Bhi Dil Hai Hindustani	**Rahul Nanda & Himanshu Nanda** –; • **Dhadkan**‡ • **Jungle**‡ • **Mission Kashmir**‡ • **Pukar**‡

=== Special awards ===
Lifetime Achievement	Special Jury Award
**Pran**	**Mahesh Manjrekar** (for Astitva and Nidaan)
Noor Jehan Award for Music	Screen Award for Landmark Year, 2000
**Lata Mangeshkar**	**Roshan family**
Award for 50 Years of contribution to Hindi Cinema
**B. R. Chopra**	**Dev Anand**

== Superlatives ==
Multiple nominations
Nominations	Film
17	Kaho Naa... Pyaar Hai
14	Mission Kashmir
11	Mohabbatein
9	Josh
9	Jungle
8	Hey Ram
7	Dhadkan
7	Fiza
6	Astitva
6	Hera Pheri
6	Pukar
5	Refugee
4	Kairee
4	Nidaan
3	Hamara Dil Aapke Paas Hai
3	Khiladi 420
3	Raju Chacha
2	Champion
2	Kya Kehna
2	Phir Bhi Dil Hai Hindustani

Multiple wins
Awards	Film
9	Kaho Naa... Pyaar Hai
5	Mission Kashmir
3	Astitva
2	Hera Pheri
2	Jungle
