= Mohabbatein (soundtrack) =

Soundtrack album by Jatin–Lalit
- Released: 21 January 2000
- Recorded: 1999–2000
- Genre: Feature film soundtrack
- Length: 50:52
- Language: Hindi
- Label: Saregama
- Producer: Jatin–Lalit

Jatin–Lalit chronology
Dhai Akshar Prem Ke (2000)	Mohabbatein (2000)	Phir Bhi Dil Hai Hindustani (2000)

Mohabbatein is the soundtrack album to the 2000 film of the same name directed by Aditya Chopra and produced by Yash Chopra under Yash Raj Films. The soundtrack featured seven original songs and two instrumental themes, composed by Jatin–Lalit and lyrics written by Anand Bakshi, and the vocals were a combination of debutants and seasoned singers. The soundtrack was released through Saregama label on 21 January 2000 to positive reviews and was commercially successful, receiving accolades.

== Development ==
The duo Jatin–Lalit composed Mohabbatein's soundtrack and the lyrics were written by Anand Bakshi, reuniting with Aditya after Dilwale Dulhania Le Jayenge (1995). To ensure the freshness in its music, the duo enlisted six debutant singers for the debutant actors in the background: Ishaan (for Jimmy Sheirgill), Manohar Shetty (for Jugal Hansraj), Pritha Mazumdar (for Shamita Shetty), Shweta Pandit (for Kim Sharma), Sonali Bhatawdekar (for Preeti Jhangiani), and Udhbhav (for Uday Chopra), had recorded the songs while Lata Mangeshkar, Udit Narayan, and Jaspinder Narula supplied vocals for Aishwarya Rai, Shah Rukh Khan and Archana Puran Singh, respectively.

Since the film revolved around three different love stories, Lalit insisted to have six different voices and thought it was "a good idea to have fresh voices for the newcomers so that it also helps the album sound fresh". As the music for Mohabbatein, were subjective to comparison on other films from the banner, which had successful soundtracks, they had to ensure the music should be fresh. Lalit added that using established singers, would take away the freshness the album needed, which resulted in the duo to search for new singers. After finalizing them, he signed a contract with them so that they would be in Bombay for rehearsals, and they have to work only on the film's songs for the entire duration of recording and rendering. When the songs were being fine-tuned, the singers had rehearsals every day for two months, as they had no practical knowledge on singing in front of a microphone and its vocals were raw. The duo had to conduct an in-studio voice test to ensure that their voices sound perfectly on the microphone.

Lalit stated that he and Jatin faced difficulties on training newcomers, unlike working with experienced singers, as they had to train them extensively and also sort out which singer suited the emotions of a particular character. The song "Soni Soni" had three different antaras for different characters, as "each couple has an identity, an attitude quite different from the other" and the voice being fixed at same character throughout the film. Unlike Narayan and Mangeshkar's songs, the rest of the music performed by the debutants had a group song touch to them.

== Release ==
The film's soundtrack album featured nine compositions—seven original songs and two background scores—which was released on 21 January 2000. The album was first distributed in audio CDs and cassettes by Saregama (then released under His Master's Voice) to which Chopra earned an advance of ₹75 million (US$1.67 million) from the music rights. In 2004, the album was uploaded to music platforms and digital retail stores under Chopra's newly launched label and the company's subsidiary YRF Music. The digital album was released on Dolby Atmos music.

== Reception ==
Critical response to the soundtrack of Mohabbatein was mixed. According to Screen, "Jatin–Lalit's music, though not chartbuster stuff, is melodious and situational. It grows on you as you watch the film." Ratna Malay of Bollywood Hungama called it "a typical Yash Chopra kind with a mixture" of Dil To Pagal Hai. Savera R. Someshwar of Rediff.com described the music "non-intrusive", and Savita Padmanabhan of The Hindu, opined that the music "sounds almost like a medley of Dilwale Dulhania Le Jayenge and Dil To Pagal Hai". Vinayak Chakravorty of Hindustan Times criticized it as "[absolutely] dud" while Dinesh Raheja of India Today stated that it "fails to live up to the exacting standards set by Yashraj Films' previous hits." According to the film-trade website Box Office India, the soundtrack album sold five million copies and became the highest-selling Bollywood soundtrack of the year.

== Track listing ==
No.	Title	Singer(s)	Length
1.	"Humko Humise Chura Lo"	Lata Mangeshkar, Udit Narayan, Vocalists include Ishaan, Manohar Shetty, Pritha Mazumdar, Shweta Pandit, Sonali Bhatawdekar, Udhbhav	7:53
2.	"Chalte Chalte" (Part 1)	Ishaan, Manohar Shetty, Pritha Mazumdar, Shweta Pandit, Sonali Bhatawdekar, Udhbhav	7:38
3.	"Pairon Mein Bandhan Hai (Part 1)"	Ishaan, Manohar Shetty, Pritha Mazumdar, Shweta Pandit, Sonali Bhatawdekar, Udhbhav, Udit Narayan (Vocalist), Lata Mangeshkar (Vocalist),	7:01
4.	"Aankhein Khuli"	Ishaan, Lata Mangeshkar (Vocalist), Manohar Shetty, Pritha Mazumdar, Shah Rukh Khan, Shweta Pandit, Sonali Bhatawdekar, Udhbhav, Udit Narayan	7:02
5.	"Soni Soni"	Ishaan, Jaspinder Narula, Manohar Shetty, Pritha Mazumdar, Shweta Pandit, Sonali Bhatawdekar, Udhbhav, Udit Narayan, Lata Mangeshkar (Vocalist),	9:07
6.	"Chalte Chalte" (Part 2 (Not in the film))	Manohar Shetty, Pritha Mazumdar, Shweta Pandit, Sonali Bhatawdekar, Udhbhav	2:49
7.	"Zinda Rehti Hain Mohabbatein (Part 2 of Pairon Mein Bandhan Hai)"	Udit Narayan, Lata Mangeshkar, Ishaan, Manohar Shetty, Pritha Mazumdar, Shweta Pandit, Sonali Bhatawdekar, Udhbhav (Vocalists)	2:23
8.	"Mohabbatein Love Themes" (Instrumental)		2:17
9.	"Rhythms of Mohabbatein" (Instrumental)		3:56
Total length:			50:52

== Awards and nominations ==
Award	Date of ceremony (Note: The date is linked to the article about the awards held that year, wherever possible.)	Category	Recipient(s)	Result	Ref.
Bollywood Movie Awards	28 April 2001	Best Music Director	Jatin–Lalit	Nominated	
Bollywood Movie Awards	28 April 2001	Best Lyricist	Anand Bakshi (for "Humko Humise Chura Lo")	Nominated	
Filmfare Awards	17 February 2001	Best Music Director	Jatin–Lalit	Nominated	
Filmfare Awards	17 February 2001	Best Lyricist	Anand Bakshi (for "Humko Humise Chura Lo")	Nominated	
Filmfare Awards	17 February 2001	Best Male Playback Singer	Udit Narayan (for "Humko Humise Chura Lo")	Nominated	
International Indian Film Academy Awards	16 June 2001	Best Music Director	Jatin–Lalit	Nominated	
Screen Awards	20 January 2001	Best Music Director	Jatin–Lalit	Nominated	
Screen Awards	20 January 2001	Best Lyricist	Anand Bakshi (for "Humko Humise Chura Lo")	Won	

== Sources ==
- "Mohabbatein (Original Motion Picture Soundtrack)". iTunes. Apple Music. 21 January 2000. Archived from the original on 28 March 2021.
- Tandon, Runima Borah (21 October 2000). "Mohabbatein: At sixes!". Rediff.com. Archived from the original on 4 March 2003.
- Aiyar, V. Shankar (6 November 2000). "Happy endings". India Today. Archived from the original on 28 March 2021.
- "50 Years of YRF: Yash Raj Films becomes the first music label in India to adopt Dolby Atmos". Bollywood Hungama. Hungama Digital Media Entertainment. 6 October 2020. Archived from the original on 9 February 2021.
- "Critics' Ratings: Mohabbatein". Filmfare. 2000. Archived from the original on 11 February 2001.
- "Breezy, romantic fare". Screen. 3 November 2000. Archived from the original on 20 August 2001.
- Malay, Ratna (2000). "Music Review: Mohabbatein". Bollywood Hungama. Archived from the original on 6 December 2000.
- Someshwar, Savera R. (27 October 2000). "Feel good with the hankies!". Rediff.com. Archived from the original on 27 February 2017.
- Padmanabhan, Savitha (3 November 2000). "Film Review: Mohabbatein". The Hindu. Archived from the original on 28 March 2021.
- Chakravorty, Vinayak (2000). "Bollywood: Mohabbatein". Hindustan Times. Archived from the original on 1 December 2000.
- "Music Hits 2000–2009 (Figures in Units)". Box Office India. 2009. Archived from the original on 15 February 2008.
- Raheja, Dinesh (2000). "Mohabbatein — Maple Syrup". India Today. Archived from the original on 17 April 2001.
- Bhattacharya, Roshmila (26 January 2001). "Seventh Screen Videocon Awards". Screen. Archived from the original on 5 March 2001.
- "Big night". Filmfare Awards. Archived from the original on 10 February 2001.
- Dhirad, Sandeep (2006). "Filmfare nominees and winners" (PDF). Filmfare Awards. pp. 107–109. Archived (PDF) from the original on 19 October 2015.
- "Getting to Nassau Veterans Memorial Coliseum". Bollywood Movie Awards. Archived from the original on 24 January 2001.
- "Kaho Naa Pyaar Hai all the way, bags 8 trophies". The Indian Express. 21 January 2001. Archived from the original on 24 February 2004.
- "Kelvinator IIFA Awards: Nominations". International Indian Film Academy Awards. Archived from the original on 24 October 2002.
- "List of awards won by Mohabbatein movie". Yash Raj Films. Archived from the original on 23 January 2021.
- Nahta, Komal (8 November 2000). "Mohabbatein wins, Mission Kashmir loses". Rediff.com. Archived from the original on 24 April 2003.
- "Nominations for 7th Annual Screen Awards are". Screen. Archived from the original on 19 February 2004.
- Patil, Vimla (9 June 2001). "Bollywood's mega show in Sun City". The Tribune. Archived from the original on 2 December 2008.
- "The nominees for the Bollywood Awards 2001 were". Bollywood Movie Awards. Archived from the original on 7 April 2002.
- "Winners of the Bollywood Awards 2001". Bollywood Movie Awards. Archived from the original on 7 April 2002.
