= Ganesh Jain =

Indian film producer

- Born: Ganesh Jain
- Occupation: Producer
- Relatives: See Jain family

Ganesh Jain is an Indian film producer. He, along with his brothers, Ratan Jain, Girish Jain, Champak Jain, Umed Jain, Ramesh Jain and Bhawar Jain, founded the company Venus Records & Tapes. Major films he has produced include Baazigar, Josh, Garam Masala, Aap Ki Khatir and De Dana Dan. He was elected as chairman of the Indian Music Industry (IMI).

== Career ==
Ganesh Jain and his brother Ratan Jain started the business of manufacturing video cassettes during the early 1980s under the banner of Venus Records & Tapes Manufacturing Company. In 1992 they diversified their business by starting to produce films. The first film produced was Khiladi. The company in past two decades has amassed many audio, satellite, video and cable rights.

== Filmography ==
=== Films ===
Year	Title	Notes
1992	Khiladi	
1993	Baazigar	
1994	Main Khiladi Tu Anari	
1995	Akele Hum Akele Tum	
1997	Yes Boss	
1998	Miss 420	
1998	Keemat: They are back	
1999	Baadshah	
2000	Mela	
2000	Josh	
2001	Hum Ho Gaye Aapke	
2002	Tum Se Achcha Kaun Hai	
2002	Humraaz	
2002	Hathyar: Face to Face with Reality	
2003	Hungama	
2004	Main Hoon Na	
2004	Hulchul	
2005	Elaan	
2005	Garam Masala	
2006	Aap ki khatir	
2008	Maan Gaye Mughal-e-Azam	
2009	De Dana Dan	
2015	Kis Kisko Pyaar Karoon	
2021	Hungama 2	
2022	Dear Father	Gujarati film
2025	Kis Kisko Pyaar Karoon 2	

=== Web series ===
Year	Title	Language	Platform	Notes
2020	Forbidden Love	Hindi	ZEE5	
