= Blackmail (2005 film) =

2005 Indian film by Anil Devgan

- Theatrical release poster
- Directed by: Anil Devgan
- Written by: Robin Bhatt; Javed Siddiqui
- Based on: Ransom (1996) by Ron Howard
- Produced by: Narendra Bajaj; Shyam Bajaj; Veeru Devgan
- Starring: Ajay Devgn; Sunil Shetty; Priyanka Chopra; Dia Mirza
- Cinematography: Nirmal Jani
- Edited by: Steven Bernard
- Music by: Himesh Reshammiya
- Production companies: Siddhi Vinayak Creations; Devgan Entertainment Software
- Release date: 28 January 2005
- Running time: 126 minutes
- Country: India
- Language: Hindi
- Budget: ₹9.50 crore
- Box office: ₹6.58 crore

Blackmail is a 2005 Indian Hindi-language action thriller film directed by Anil Devgan, which stars Ajay Devgn, Sunil Shetty and Priyanka Chopra in the lead roles. The film is inspired by the 1996 American film Ransom.

== Plot ==
Inspector Abhay Rathod is an honest and diligent police officer employed with the Mumbai Police. He is assigned the case of racketeer and criminal don, Shekhar Mohan. Abhay successfully entraps and arrests Shekhar and has him sentenced to jail.

Abhay is now the Assistant Commissioner of Police, with a happy family: wife Sajana and son Chirag. Having completed his jail term, Shekhar Mohan is looking to seek vengeance against Abhay. On finding out that Abhay is the only one who knows the whereabouts of his loss, Shekhar kidnaps Chirag and tricks Abhay into believing that he has killed Chirag. Grief-stricken, Abhay's wife tells Shekhar that Chirag is his lost son. On finding out Chirag loves cars, hellbent on earning Chirag's affection, Shekhar takes him to various racecourses. Thrilled at watching so many fast sports cars, Chirag warms up to Uncle Shekhar. But, with Abhay and the police closing in fast on him, will Shekhar maintain his son's love?

== Cast ==
- Ajay Devgn as Shekhar Mohan
- Sunil Shetty as ACP Abhay Rathod
- Diya Mirza as Anjali Mohan, Shekhar's wife
- Priyanka Chopra as Sanjana Rathod, Abhay's wife
- Parth Dave as Chirag Rathod, Abhay & Sanjana's son
- Mukesh Rishi as Chhota
- Monalisa as Item Girl

== Music ==
Blackmail

Soundtrack album by Himesh Reshammiya
- Released: 28 January 2005 (India)
- Recorded: 2005
- Venue: Mumbai
- Genre: Feature film soundtrack
- Producer: Himesh Reshammiya

Himesh Reshammiya chronology
Insan (2005)	Blackmail (2005)	Kuchh Meetha Ho Jaye (2005)

All songs composed by Himesh Reshammiya while all lyrics were penned by Sameer.

Track Listing

#	Song	Singer
1	"Jaana Nahin Tha"	Alka Yagnik, Sonu Nigam
2	"Tune Di Bekarari"	Shaan, Shreya Ghoshal, Jayesh Gandhi
3	"Akhiyaan Lada Jaa" (With Rhythm)	Alka Yagnik, Udit Narayan
4	"Kaun Kehata Hai"	Shreya Ghoshal, Udit Narayan
5	"Imli Imli"	Hema Sardesai, Jayesh Gandhi
6	"Tune Di Bekrari" (Part 1)	Shaan
7	"Akhiyan Lada Jaa"	Alka Yagnik, Udit Narayan
8	"Tune Di Bekarari" (Part 2)	Shaan, Zubeen Garg
9	"Jaana Nahin Tha"	Instrumental
10	"Tu Ne Di Bekarari" (Part 3)	Shaan, Zubeen Garg

== Reception ==
Shilpa Bharatan-Iyer of Rediff.com wrote, "Blackmail, in case I have still not spelt it out, is very, very predictable. Yet, the film is enjoyable, thanks to its fast-paced action. Which is what makes it better than many movies running today." Jaspreet Pandohar of BBC.com gave the film two out of five, writing, "Anil Devgan's heavy-handed direction gives away the plot too quickly and what could have been a gripping thriller ends up a damp squib leaking suspense through its seams.
