= Screen Award for Best Music Director =

Annual film award in India

The Screen Award for Best Music Director is chosen by a distinguished panel of judges from the Indian Bollywood film industry and the winners are announced in January.

== Superlatives ==
=== Multiple wins ===
Wins	Recipient
5	A. R. Rahman
4	Pritam
3	Shankar–Ehsaan–Loy
2	Nadeem-Shravan, Rajesh Roshan, Amaal Malik, Ankit Tiwari

=== Multiple nominees ===
Nominations	Recipient
5	Anu Malik, A. R. Rahman, Pritam, Shankar–Ehsaan–Loy
4	Amit Trivedi
3	Jatin–Lalit, Mithoon, Yo Yo Honey Singh
2	Rajesh Roshan, Sajid–Wajid, Ankit Tiwari

== Winners and nominees ==
- Winners are highlighted first in gold, followed by the other nominees.

† – Indicates the performance also won the Filmfare Award for Best Music Director
‡ – Indicates the performance was also nominated for the Filmfare Award for Best Music Director

=== 1990s ===
Year	Photos of winners	Music Director	Film	Ref.
1995 (1st)		R. D. Burman (posthumous) †	1942: A Love Story	
1996 (2nd)		Rajesh Roshan †	Karan Arjun	
1997 (3rd)	–	Nadeem–Shravan †	Raja Hindustani	
1998 (4th)	–	Nadeem–Shravan †	Pardes	
1999 (5th)		Jatin–Lalit †	Kuch Kuch Hota Hai	

=== 2000s ===
Year	Photos of winners	Music Director	Film	Ref.
2000 (6th)		A. R. Rahman †	Taal	
2001 (7th)		Rajesh Roshan †	Kaho Naa... Pyaar Hai	
2001 (7th)		Anu Malik ‡	Fiza	
2001 (7th)		Anu Malik ‡	Josh	
2001 (7th)		Jatin–Lalit ‡	Mohabbatein	
2001 (7th)		Nadeem–Shravan ‡	Dhadkan	
2002 (8th)		Shankar–Ehsaan–Loy ‡	Dil Chahta Hai	
2002 (8th)		A. R. Rahman †	Lagaan	
2002 (8th)		Anu Malik ‡	Mujhe Kucch Kehna Hai	
2002 (8th)		Sandeep Chowta	Pyaar Tune Kya Kiya	
2002 (8th)		Uttam Singh ‡	Gadar: Ek Prem Katha	
2003 (9th)		Ismail Darbar ‡	Devdas	
2004 (10th)		Himesh Reshammiya ‡	Tere Naam	
2004 (10th)		Jatin–Lalit, Aadesh Shrivastava ‡	Chalte Chalte	
2004 (10th)		M. M. Keeravani	Jism	
2004 (10th)		Rajesh Roshan ‡	Koi... Mil Gaya	
2004 (10th)		Shankar–Ehsaan–Loy †	Kal Ho Naa Ho	
2005 (11th)		Anu Malik †	Main Hoon Na	
2005 (11th)		Himesh Reshammiya	Dil Maange More	
2005 (11th)		Jatin–Lalit ‡	Hum Tum	
2005 (11th)		Pritam ‡	Dhoom	
2005 (11th)		Sajid–Wajid, Anu Malik	Mujhse Shaadi Karogi	
2006 (12th)		Shankar–Ehsaan–Loy †	Bunty Aur Babli	
2007 (13th)		Vishal Bhardwaj ‡	Omkara	
2008 (14th)		A. R. Rahman †	Guru	
2009 (15th)		A. R. Rahman †	Jaane Tu... Ya Jaane Na	
2009 (15th)		A. R. Rahman ‡	Jodhaa Akbar	
2009 (15th)		Pritam	Jannat	
2009 (15th)		Shankar–Ehsaan–Loy ‡	Rock On!!	
2009 (15th)		Vishal–Shekhar	Bachna Ae Haseeno	

=== 2010s ===
Year	Photos of winners	Music Director	Film	Ref.
2010 (16th)		A. R. Rahman †	Delhi–6	
2011 (17th)		Sajid–Wajid and Lalit Pandit † Shankar–Ehsaan–Loy ‡	Dabangg My Name Is Khan	
2012 (18th)		A. R. Rahman †	Rockstar	
2013 (19th)		Pritam †	Barfi!	
2013 (19th)		Amit Trivedi ‡	Ishaqzaade	
2013 (19th)		Ram Sampath	Talaash: The Answer Lies Within	
2013 (19th)		Sajid–Wajid	Dabangg 2	
2013 (19th)		Sneha Khanwalkar ‡	Gangs Of Wasseypur	
2013 (19th)		Vishal–Shekhar ‡	Student Of The Year	
2014 (20th)		Pritam ‡	Yeh Jawaani Hai Deewani	
2014 (20th)		A. R. Rahman ‡	Raanjhanaa	
2014 (20th)		Amit Trivedi	Kai Po Che!	
2014 (20th)		Ankit Tiwari, Mithoon and Jeet Ganguly †	Aashiqui 2	
2014 (20th)		Shankar–Ehsaan–Loy	Bhaag Milkha Bhaag	
2015 (21st)		Mithoon, Ankit Tiwari, Soch ‡	Ek Villain	
2015 (21st)		A. R. Rahman	Highway	
2015 (21st)		Amit Trivedi ‡	Queen	
2015 (21st)		Himesh Reshammiya, Meet Bros Anjjan, Yo Yo Honey Singh ‡	Kick	
2015 (21st)		Pritam, Anupam Amod, Arko Pravo Mukherjee, Yo Yo Honey Singh, Mithoon ‡	Yaariyan	
2015 (21st)		Vishal–Shekhar	Happy New Year	
2016 (22nd)		Amaal Mallik, Ankit Tiwari and Meet Bros Anjjan †	Roy	
2017 (23rd)		Pritam †	Ae Dil Hai Mushkil	
2018 (24th)		Pritam †	Dangal	
2019 (25th)		Amit Trivedi ‡	Manmarziyaan	
2019 (25th)		Ajay–Atul ‡	Dhadak	
2019 (25th)		Amaal Malik, Rochak Kohli, Yo Yo Honey Singh, Guru Randhawa, Zack Knight, Saurabh–Vaibhav and Rajat Nagpal ‡	Sonu Ke Titu Ki Sweety	
2019 (25th)		Shankar–Ehsaan–Loy	Raazi ‡	
2019 (25th)		Vishal–Shekhar	Tiger Zinda Hai	
2019 (25th)		Shashwat Sachdev, White Noise, Vishal Mishra, QARAN, Arijit Dutta	Veere Di Wedding	

=== 2020s ===
Year	Photos of winners	Music Director	Film	Ref.
2020 (26th)	–	Amaal Malik, Mithoon, Vishal Mishra, Sachet–Parampara, Akhil Sachdeva † Zoya Akhtar, Ankur Tewari †	Kabir Singh Gully Boy	

== See also ==
- Screen Awards
- Bollywood
- Cinema of India
