= Raju Chacha =

2000 Indian film by Anil Devgan

- Poster
- Directed by: Anil Devgan
- Screenplay by: Robin Bhatt
- Story by: Anees Bazmee
- Produced by: Ajay Devgn; Veeru Devgan
- Starring: Ajay Devgn; Kajol; Johnny Lever; Rishi Kapoor; Sanjay Dutt
- Cinematography: Nirmal Jani
- Edited by: Chandan Arora
- Music by: Jatin–Lalit
- Production company: Devgans Films
- Distributed by: B4U Films
- Release dates: 28 December 2000 (United States); 29 December 2000 (India)
- Country: India
- Language: Hindi
- Budget: ₹25 crore
- Box office: ₹20.92 crore

Raju Chacha (transl. Uncle Raju) is a 2000 Indian Hindi-language action-comedy film directed by Anil Devgan and produced by his cousin Ajay Devgn, debuting as a film producer under his banner Ajay Devgn FFilms (now Devgn Films). The film stars Ajay, Kajol and Rishi Kapoor, along with Sanjay Dutt in a special appearance. Raju Chacha was released theatrically on 29 December 2000 in India, whereas on 28 December 2000 (1 day before) in the United States. Reports suggest that Manisha Koirala was originally considered for the female lead in Raju Chacha, but she stepped away due to prior commitments. Subsequently, Ajay Devgn invited Kajol to join the project. The film tells the story of Shekhar (Devgn), a con artist who falls in love with Anna (Kajol), the governess of three children belonging to the wealthy widower Siddhant Rai (Kapoor). When Siddhant dies, his children are placed under the custody of their scheming relatives. Shekhar returns into their lives, posing as Rajit Rai, the long lost brother of Siddhant to save the three children and their fortune.

With a budget of ₹250 million the film was one of the most anticipated films of the year. Upon release, the film received mixed reviews from critics, praising Devgn and Kapoor's performance and visual effects, but criticism for its slow pacing, screenplay and runtime. At the box office, the film failed to recoup its budget, grossing only ₹209.2 million worldwide It was the most expensive Indian film made until then.

== Plot ==
Siddhant Rai is a wealthy single father looking after his three children, Rohit, Rahul and Rani. Also living with them is the family butler, BBC. Because they have no mother, the three children are so naughty that they drive away any teacher or governess hired by their father.

Due to his work commitments, Siddhant arranges for a new governess much to the dismay of his children. Meanwhile, Shekhar and his friend Jadu have just robbed a bank and are evading police when Shekhar falls instantly in love with Anna who is on her way to work as the governess for Siddhant's children. Anna is introduced to the children - despite initially trying to drive her away, the children come to accept her as an older sister. After repeated attempts, Shekhar manages to win Anna's heart and with Siddhant's permission, the two are allowed to get married. However, on the wedding day, Shekhar is arrested for stealing the wedding rings and only marrying Anna to get to Siddhant's wealth. A devastated Anna decides to return to the orphanage where she works.

Siddhant is soon killed in an accident and his children are placed under the care of their cruel relatives who only have an interest in Siddhant's fortune. Just as the magistrate is about to sign the adoption papers, a strange character enters the Rai household, claiming he is Rajit Rai, the long-lost brother of Siddhant (and therefore the true heir to his fortune) - he is none other than Shekhar. The magistrate is convinced that the man is truly Siddhant's brother so refuses to sign the adoption papers but sets a date for the hearing. The children are at first angry to have Shekhar back in their lives (due to him being a thief). However, BBC and Jadu explain that he is the only one who helps save the children's fortune - the children warm up to their new 'Raju Chacha.'

Anna soon returns to the Rai household and is angry to see Shekhar back, believing he is attempting to rob the children. Another man soon enters the household, also claiming to be Rajit Rai - the relatives are confused because this man looks and acts more like Rajit Rai than does Shekhar. Shekhar makes a deal - if the relatives prove that he is the real Rajit Rai, he shall take only 25% of the share. The relatives agree but realize too late that Shekhar conned them and that the 'real' Rajit Rai is actually a fellow conman of his named Gafoor. The relatives are driven out of the house. Realizing that Shekhar was helping the children, Anna starts to fall in love with him again.

Shekhar and Anna look after the children. However, their happiness is short lived when the relatives return and expose Shekhar as a fraud and have him sent back to prison. The children are shocked to learn that their father was murdered by his relatives for his money. Shekhar breaks out of prison and manages to kill the relatives, saving the children, BBC, Jadu, and Anna. Shekhar and Anna get married and care for Rohit, Rahul and Rani, while searching for the real Raju Chacha.

== Cast ==
- Rishi Kapoor as Siddhant Rai
- Ajay Devgan as Shekhar / Rajit Rai a.k.a. Raju Chacha
- Kajol as Anna
- Johnny Lever as Jadu
- Shahbaz Khan as Babu
- Sakshi Sem as Rani Rai
- Kinshuk Vaidya as Rahul Rai
- Harsh Lunia as Rohit Rai
- Tiku Talsania as Banky Bihari Chaturdevi (B. B. C.)
- Govind Namdev as Vikram Sinha
- Pramod Moutho as Prabhakar Sinha
- Smita Jaykar as Mother Superior
- Anil Nagrath as Magistrate
- Sanjay Dutt as Gafoor / Rajit Rai a.k.a. Raju Chacha (special appearance)
- Kaivalya Chheda as Daddu, Pramod's son.

== Release ==
Raju Chacha premiered at the Academy of Motion Picture Arts and Sciences' theatres in the United States on 28 December 2000 and was released worldwide on the next day.

== Reception ==
=== Box office ===
The film grossed ₹209.2 million worldwide against a budget of ₹250 million, and was declared as a "Disaster" by Box Office India.

=== Critical response ===
Taran Adarsh of IndiaFM gave the film three out of five, writing, "On the whole, RAJU CHACHA meets the expectations at places, but falls short of it at times too. Yet, the craze for the film has resulted in the film taking a fabulous start all over. The festive period and lack of any major opposition in the coming week will boost the business prospects of the film, keeping its investors more than happy. A movie that will entertain kids and kid-at-heart." Aparajita Saha of Rediff.com gave a negative review, writing, "It's almost as if debut director Anil Devgan conscientiously studied an imaginary book called The Elementary Guide to Bollywood Box Office Success and then faithfully threw in a love angle with a reluctant heroine, a reformed hero, poor little rich kids, the villains, the faithful dog and the funny sidekick. He knew all the rules but forgot to use his heart while implementing them."

=== Awards ===
Award	Category	Recipient(s)	Result	Ref(s)
7th Screen Awards	Best Action Director	Jaisingh Nijjar	Nominated	
7th Screen Awards	Best Art Direction	Nitin Desai	Nominated	
7th Screen Awards	Best Special Effects	Raju Chacha	Won	

== Music ==
Raju Chacha

Studio album by Jatin–Lalit
- Released: 2000 (India)
- Genre: Feature film soundtrack
- Label: Sony Music Zee Music Company
- Producer: Jatin–Lalit

Jatin–Lalit chronology
Mohabbatein (2000)	Raju Chacha (2000)	Raja Ko Rani Se Pyar Ho Gaya (2000)

The soundtrack of the film contains 7 songs. The music is composed by Jatin–Lalit, with lyrics authored by Anand Bakshi.

Song	Singer(s)
"Aaj Ka Kya Program Hai"	Abhijeet Bhattacharya, Kavita Krishnamurthy, Sudesh Bhonsle
"Dil Dil Ka Yeh Kaam Hai"	Amit Kumar, Gavin Bryars
"Ek Sher Tha Ek Sherni"	Shankar Mahadevan, Shweta Pandit, Abrar ul Haq
"Kahin Se Aayi Rani"	Amit Kumar, Kavita Krishnamurthy, Patrick Bruel
"Raju Chacha"	Shaan, Francis Menezes, Shweta Pandit, Shradha Pandit, Sneha Pant
"Tune Mujhe Pehchana Nahin"	Shaan
"Yeh Vaada Hai"	Kumar Sanu, Alka Yagnik
"Yeh Vaada Hai" (Sad)	Alka Yagnik
