= Maan Gaye Mughal-e-Azam =

Maan Gaye Mughal-E-Azam
- Theatrical release poster
- Directed by: Sanjay Chhel
- Written by: Sanjay Chhel
- Produced by: Champak Jain; Ratan Jain
- Starring: Rahul Bose; Mallika Sherawat; Paresh Rawal; Kay Kay Menon
- Cinematography: Madhu Ambat
- Edited by: Santosh Devdhar
- Music by: Anu Malik
- Distributed by: Venus Records & Tapes
- Release date: 22 August 2008
- Running time: 136 minutes
- Country: India
- Language: Hindi

Maan Gaye Mughal-E-Azam (lit. 'Believe You Mughal-e-Azam') is a 2008 Indian Hindi-language crime comedy film about a group of actors who attempt to prevent an underworld conspiracy from destabilizing the Indian government. The film is set in 1993 after the communal riots that followed the demolition of the Babri Masjid. The film stars Rahul Bose and Mallika Sherawat and was directed and written by Sanjay Chhel.

The film is loosely based on the 1983 film To Be or Not to Be, which itself is based on the 1942 film of the same name.

== Plot ==
When the Kalakar Theatre Company, a theatre group in Goa, attempts to stage a political drama, the local authorities close down the play and force them to perform a more traditional play, a stage version of Mughal-E-Azam. The company then discovers that an underworld don is engineering a bomb blast to shake confidence in the Indian government. The drama company forms a plan to save the entire city from the blast. The actors, led by their producer Uday, are assisted by RAW agent Arjun Rastogi in their efforts to foil the bombing. Arjun falls in love with Uday's wife, Shabnam who also becomes involved with an ISI agent. Performing multiple roles in disguise, the characters eventually save the entire nation from the bomb blast.

== Cast ==
- Mallika Sherawat as Shabnam Kapoor
- Rahul Bose as Arjun Rastogi
- Paresh Rawal as Uday Shankar Mazumdar
- Kay Kay Menon as Haldi Hassan
- Rajeev Khandelwal as Ahmed Bhoy
- Manoj Joshi as Police Inspector Patil
- Zakir Hussain as Show Director Dubey
- Pawan Malhotra as Qayyum Cable (Maut ka Label)
- Viju Khote (Vijoo Khote)
- Homi Wadia
- Tannaz Irani as Champa

== Soundtrack ==
The soundtrack was composed by Anu Malik with lyrics by Sanjay Chhel.

1. "Ek Toh Sharab Kam" - Pankaj Udhas
2. "Aaj Mood Hai Ishqaiyaan" - Sunidhi Chauhan
3. "Ishquiyaan (Remix)" - Sonu Nigam
4. "Marmari Baahe (Remix)" - Anu Malik, Mahalakshmi Iyer
5. "Marmari Baahein, Sandhali Saansein" - Kunal Ganjawala, Mahalakshmi Iyer
6. "Pyar Kiya Toh Darna Kya" - Shaan, Mahalakshmi Iyer, Ishq Bector, Anushka Manchanda
7. "Khuda Mere Ishq Khuda" - Mohit Chauhan, Abrar ul Haq & Sonu Nigam
8. "Maine Pyar Kyun Kiya" - Kunal Ganjawala

== Reception ==
Maan Gaye Mughal-E-Azam received mostly negative reviews from critics. Khalid Mohamed writing for Hindustan Times gave the film 1 star out of 5, stating ″Although Chhel can be a sparkling dialogue writer, here both his lines and direction are as flat as week-old beer. Evidently, inspired by Ernst Lubitsch’s 1942 comedy, To Be or Not To Be (wow, man what sources!), this Mallika-e-Azam is about her bare back, bling costumes and a plot that would need a research team to deconstruct.″ and was termed "deliriously bad" by Anupama Chopra. It also performed poorly at the box office.
