= Khiladi (1992 film) =

1992 Indian film by Abbas-Mustan

- Theatrical release poster
- Directed by: Abbas–Mustan
- Written by: Naeem–Ejaz
- Dialogues by: Aadesh K. Arjun
- Story by: S. Khan
- Produced by: Girish Jain; Champak Jain
- Starring: Akshay Kumar; Ayesha Jhulka; Deepak Tijori; Sabeeha
- Cinematography: Thomas A. Xavier
- Edited by: Hussain A. Burmawala
- Music by: Jatin–Lalit
- Production companies: Venus Records & Tapes; United Seven
- Release date: 5 June 1992
- Running time: 152 minutes
- Country: India
- Language: Hindi
- Box office: est.₹7 crore (India Gross Collection)

Khiladi (transl. Player) is a 1992 Indian Hindi-language action thriller film directed by Abbas–Mustan. The film was produced by Girish Jain and Champak Jain under the banner of Venus Records and Tapes. It marked Akshay Kumar's breakthrough role and also stars Ayesha Jhulka, Deepak Tijori and Sabeeha, with Prem Chopra, Shakti Kapoor, Anant Mahadevan and Johnny Lever in supporting roles.

== Plot ==
Raj Malhotra, Boney, Neelam Chaudhary and Sheetal are four college pranksters. Raj is the younger brother of Inspector Suresh Malhotra, Sheetal is the daughter of wealthy Kailashnath and Neelam is a rich heiress with her uncle as her only living relative. Raj and Neelam fall for each other. Sheetal and Boney too fall for each other

Raj is a habitual gambler, who has yet to lose, but when he bets that he can extort money from Kailashnath, the gang gets skeptical but agrees to help him. As per the bet, they trick Kailashnath into believing that Sheetal is kidnapped, while in reality, they have housed themselves in a cottage outside Bombay belonging to Pillai. When Raj makes the bet, he decides that Boney will pose as a kidnapper with him. Raj puts his plan into action and Kailashnath gets panicked and decides not to alert the cops. However, one of his aides becomes suspicious. On deciding that Sheetal has been kidnapped, Suresh is saddled with the case. Learning this, the group panics. Kailashnath, however, delivers the money, ignorant of the development. Raj and Boney recover the money and go to meet the still skeptical females. Neelam sees them coming and goes to receive them. She is surprised to see the money and the trio calls Sheetal.

Sheetal arrives with a strange look on her face and collapses dead, revealing a knife in her back. The gang is taken aback by this unexpected development, but quickly recovers and hides Sheetal's body before anyone gets a scent. They successfully evade the suspicions of Suresh and finally manage to hide Sheetal's body in the decklid of a car parked in a theatre parking. Sheetal's body is found, and her kidnappers become prime suspects. Meanwhile, some strange developments are taking place: a dancer named Julie blackmails Kailashnath. It is revealed that Julie is a well-known dancer, but has been blackmailing Kailash for quite some time.

She asks a hefty amount; Kailashnath refuses where Julie threatens and tells him to attend a dance show she has arranged. There, Kailashnath is supposed to give her the money as a prize. Neelam gets a surprise when her uncle shows up to see how she is doing. Coincidentally, he is going to attend the function too. Raj and Boney decide to participate. On learning about Julie's meeting with Kailashnath, Suresh thinks that there is more to the case than it appears. Boney gets on stage to dance with Julie and in the middle of the dance, recognises her as the woman, who nearly killed Neelam and Sheetal and decides to confront her.

After the show, Neelam goes to her hostel while Raj goes home. Meanwhile, Suresh becomes confident that the trio is involved in the case. He confronts Raj, who tells the truth. Here, Boney comes to meet Julie, only to see her dressing room door is locked. He hears some voices and peeps through a keyhole.

Julie is with a man whom Boney is unable to see. Boney's suspicion proves correct as he hears Julie tell the man that she tried to kill the gang on his orders. She blackmails the man, too, and he kills her. At this point, Boney sees the killer and flees. The killer is alerted of Boney's presence and sends goons to kill him. Raj and Suresh try to find Boney after they realise that he is missing. Meanwhile, Boney is stabbed and about to be killed by the goons when the brothers arrive. After Raj single-handedly takes on the goons, Boney tells him that Neelam is in danger before becoming unconscious.

Raj calls Neelam and alerts her; the phone gets suddenly disconnected. He rushes to her hostel with Suresh. Neelam is alone in the hostel and is horrified to find that the watchman is already dead. Meanwhile, Raj tells the truth to Suresh. Neelam gets attacked by the killer. She doesn't get to see his face but is able to defend herself. She succeeds in throwing him out of the window, thinking that he is dead. As she is gasping for breath, she is shocked to find that the killer is actually her uncle.

He tries to kill her. Raj and Suresh arrive in time to arrest him. While in interrogation room, he reveals that he is not Neelam's uncle. He is the manager of her estate, who was given her custody by her dying father, as Neelam had no other living relatives. He thought that he would get at least some part of the estate as her guardian, but her father's will revealed that when she turns 18, he will lose all the estate to her. According to another clause, if she died before turning 18, he would inherit the estate.

Neelam's premature death had to be natural, not foul play. Since he couldn't risk becoming a suspect, he sent Neelam to Bombay under the guise of higher education. He hired Julie to kill the gang and to write off Neelam's death as an accident. When Julie failed, he took the matter into his own hands. On learning the gang's plan, he went to the cottage and killed Sheetal, mistaking her for Neelam. After his testimony, the gang is exonerated. Boney recovers, and the gang gives Kailashnath his money back. Kailashnath forgives them, telling them not to play such a rude prank with anyone.

== Cast ==
- Akshay Kumar as Raj Malhotra
- Deepak Tijori as Bonny
- Ayesha Jhulka as Neelam Chaudhary
- Sabeeha as Sheetal
- Prem Chopra as Kailashnath
- Shakti Kapoor as Suresh Malhotra
- Tinnu Anand as College Professor P.K. Mare
- Sharat Saxena as Bahadur Singh
- Anant Mahadevan as Udaychand
- Beena as Indramukhi Malhotra
- Johnny Lever as Anna Pillai
- Amrutlal Patel as Police Constable
- Kunickaa Sadanand as Julie
- Guddi Maruti as Vada Pav
- Dinyar Contractor as College Principal
- Ghanshyam Rohera as Librarian
- Sanjeev Chitre as Sambo
- Manmauji as Canteen facility head
- Sharad Sankla as College student

== Soundtrack ==
Jatin–Lalit composed the soundtrack, which featured in the top 5 best selling albums of 1992. The music was released on Venus Records and Tapes (now called as Venus Worldwide Entertainment). The background music was conducted by Ramesh Iyer and Pradeep Lad.

Khiladi

Soundtrack album by Jatin–Lalit
- Released: 30 January 1992
- Genre: Feature film soundtrack
- Length: 54:52
- Label: Venus Records & Tapes
- Producer: Jatin–Lalit

Jatin–Lalit chronology
Jo Jeeta Wohi Sikandar (1992)	Khiladi (1992)	Raju Ban Gaya Gentleman (1992)

	Song	Singer	Lyricist
1.	"Waada Raha Sanam" (Duet)	Abhijeet, Alka Yagnik	Anwar Sagar
2.	"Khud Ko Kya Samajhti Hai"	Abhijeet, Udit Narayan, Kavita Krishnamurthy, Sapna Mukherjee	Shyam Raj
3.	"Dekha Teri Mast Nigahon Mein"	Asha Bhosle, Kumar Sanu	Mahendra Dehlvi
4.	"Kya Khabar Thi Jaana"	Asha Bhosle, Abhijeet	Dev Kohli
5.	"Waada Raha Sanam" (Male)	Abhijeet	Anwar Sagar
6.	"Hoke Man Aaj Magan"	Asha Bhosle, Abhijeet, Udit Narayan	Mahendra Dehlvi
7.	"Tu Shama Main Parwana"	Abhijeet, Alisha Chinai	Dev Kohli
8.	"Hum Yaar Hain Yaaron Ke"	Abhijeet, Udit Narayan	Mahendra Dehlvi
9.	"Hum Yaar Hain Yaaron Ke" (Sad)	Abhijeet	Mahendra Dehlvi
