= Pukar (2000 film) =

2000 Indian film by Rajkumar Santoshi

- Poster
- Directed by: Rajkumar Santoshi
- Written by: Dialogues: Rajkumar Santoshi; Anjum Rajabali; K.K. Raina
- Screenplay by: Rajkumar Santoshi; Anjum Rajabali
- Story by: Rajkumar Santoshi
- Produced by: Surinder Kapoor; Boney Kapoor
- Starring: Anil Kapoor; Madhuri Dixit; Namrata Shirodkar; Danny Denzongpa; Om Puri; Kulbhushan Kharbanda
- Cinematography: Ashok Mehta; Santosh Sivan; Baba Azmi; Chota K. Naidu
- Edited by: Rajkumar Santoshi
- Music by: A. R. Rahman
- Production company: S K Film Enterprises
- Distributed by: Eros International; Shemaroo Entertainment
- Release date: 4 February 2000
- Running time: 165 minutes
- Country: India
- Language: Hindi
- Budget: $4.9 million

Pukar (lit. 'The Call') is a 2000 Indian Hindi-language action thriller film co-written and directed by Rajkumar Santoshi with cinematography by Ashok Mehta, Santosh Sivan, Baba Azmi and Chota K. Naidu. It stars Anil Kapoor, Madhuri Dixit, Namrata Shirodkar, Danny Denzongpa, Kulbhushan Kharbanda, Shivaji Satam and Om Puri. The background score and soundtrack were composed by A. R. Rahman.

Pukar was released on 4 February 2000, received mixed reviews from critics, and was a below average grosser at the box office.

At the 48th National Film Awards, Pukar won 2 National Film Awards – the Nargis Dutt Award for Best Feature Film on National Integration and Best Actor (Kapoor). At the 46th Filmfare Awards, Pukar received 2 nominations – Best Actor (Kapoor) and Best Actress (Dixit).

== Plot ==
A group of armed terrorists led by Abhrush (Danny Denzongpa) has been cornered by the Indian Army on a mountain. In order to carry out further operations, the army has blocked all the entries and exits of the mountain. At this time, Chief Minister Mishra (Govind Namdeo) arrives at the mountain and wishes to enter to visit the temple to do a prayer. The guardians initially refuse him entry, citing the imminent danger of the terrorists. But after Mishra insists, the guardians, considering his high position in the government, let him in. Mishra is later attacked and kidnapped by Abhrush's men in the mountains, who demand a safe passage to Pakistan.

The Indian army then sends Para (Special Forces) led by an honest officer Major Jaidev Rajvansh (aka Jai, Anil Kapoor) to secretly enter the mountain rescue the chief minister Mishra and arrest the terrorists. During the operation, the army learns that the information about it has been leaked and Abhrush had known about it, but the team manages to complete the mission, with a few casualties.

Due to the fact that the army has learned they have mole working for Abhrush's organization, Colonel Iqbal Hussain (Om Puri), Jai's superior, keeps the information of Abhrush's whereabout high confidentiality: they shift him from one prison to another every week, and the destination and route information is directly sent from their army headquarters to Jai directly, without letting anyone else know. Jai also suspects that Mishra is working for Abhrush, and his kidnapping was a staged plan to make Abhrush escape. But Jai has no evidence to prove it.

Jai is given one week off and returns home to stay with his family. During the off, Jai meets Pooja Mallapa (Namrata Shirodkar), the daughter of retired General Mallapa (K.D Chandran), at an event, and they later fall in love with each other. Jai's childhood friend Anjali (Madhuri Dixit) also loves Jai. But Jai's eyes are blinded by the high social class of Pooja's family, thus showing little interest in Anjali. Anjali eventually learns about Jai and Pooja's relationship and is heartbroken. Mishra's assistant Tiwari (Anjan Srivastav) then approaches Anjail to give her an idea to win Jai back:

He claims to be a businessman asks Anjail to steal a code from Jai's files, which contains contract information of the army, He says that if she does this, the army will lose the contract, which he will get, and Jai will be suspended for a few days due to his mistake, and Pooja's family will break the relationship because they wouldn't allow their daughter to marry a suspended soldier. Anjali agrees, but she doesn't know the code that Tiwari asks her to steal is actually the coded information about Abhrush's custody and transfer route.

Anjail later successfully steals the code and gives it to Tiwari. With the code, Abhrush's henchman learn about his transfer route, and later ambush the transfer van and rescue Abhrush. Jai is suspended, and due to the evidence planted by Abhrush's men, he is later arrested for treason. Pooja and her family break their tie with him. Jai's family also faces harassment and judgement from others due to his alleged treason. Jai is eventually sentenced to 7 years in jail.

After learning that Tiwari made a mistake by leaving Anjali alive, Abhrush orders his men to kill both. Meanwhile, overwhelmed by guilt, Anjali confesses everything to Colonel Hussain. Hussain feels angry about her act and Mishra's involvement in terrorism. They go to Tiwari’s house to arrest him, but are attacked by Abhrush's henchmen, who are there to kill Tiwari. Tiwari and Hussain are both shot. Before death, Tiwari reveals that Abhrush is planning to bomb the town hall during the Independence Day celebration.

Hussain and Anjali rush to jail and tell Jai everything. Hussain tells Jai to stop Abhrush's plan before dying from the gunshot. Abhrush's men also arrive and attack the guards. During the gun fights, an enraged Jai many guards and Abrush's henchmen are killed himself. Anjali is shot while trying to protect Jai. They then both escape, and Abhrush's men keep chasing. At their hideout, Jai, seeing that injuries Anjali is dying, finally recognizes his love for her and proposes to her. Anjali is treated and later wakes up and tells Jai that she stole the code. Abhrush's men arrive and attack them. Jai manages to escape, but Anjali is captured. They then decides to keep Anjali alive to lure Jai shootout.

Jai goes to Mishra's residence and confronts him. He beats Mishra and ties a bomb around his body as a threat. He demands that Mishra take him to the town hall during the Independence Day celebration. Mishra has no choice but to agree. With Mishra's help each others, Jai enters the town hall during the celebration and then goes backstage to stop Abhrush's plan. Meanwhile, Hussain's superior, Major General (Kulbhushan Kharbanda), who is also at the scene and senses something suspicious, also goes backstage to check.

Jai finds Abhrush's henchmen and bombs. He takes down some of them and defuses some bombs. Fearing being unable to defeat Jai, Abhrush uses Anjali as a hostage to disarm Jai. Major General arrives at the scene and shoots Abhrush. Together, they kill Abhrush and manage to defuse the main bomb before it goes off. Jai forgives Anjali and confesses his love for her. Major General then appear to the public and tells the crowd what happened. He clears Jai's alleged treason and declares him a hero.

== Cast ==
- Anil Kapoor as Major Jaidev Rajvansh (Jai)
- Madhuri Dixit as Anjali
- Namrata Shirodkar as Pooja Mallapa
- Danny Denzongpa as Abhrush (Ruthless Terrorist)
- Om Puri as Colonel Iqbal Hussain (Commanding Officer of the Unit)
- Kulbhushan Kharbanda as Major General PC Acharya in the Indian Army (serving as Colonel Commandant)
- Sudhir Joshi as Anjali's Father
- Shivaji Satam as Lieutenant Colonel Suraj Dev Rana (2IC of the Unit)
- Farida Jalal as Gayetri Rajvansh
- Rohini Hattangadi as Mrs Mallapa (Pooja's Mother)
- Girish Karnad as Lieutenant General (retd.) I.D.Rajvansh
- Govind Namdeo as Mr. Mishra
- Anjan Srivastav as Tiwari (Mishra's Assistant)
- Mukesh Rishi as Bakshi (Abhrush's Assistant)
- Yashpal Sharma as Major Kartar Singh
- K.D Chandran as General Mallapa (Pooja's Father)
- Major Ravi as Major C.J. Joseph
- Viju Khote as Dayanand Awasthi
- Neeraj Vora as Mayor
- Prabhu Deva as himself in song, "Kay Sera Sera"
- Lata Mangeshkar as herself in song, "Ek Tu Hi Bharosa"

== Production ==
Sunny Deol was the first choice for the role of Major Jaidev Rajvansh opposite Madhuri Dixit. After Deol declined the role, director Rajkumar Santoshi approached producer Boney Kapoor and cast Anil Kapoor as the male lead.

== Soundtrack ==
Pukar

Soundtrack album by A. R. Rahman
- Released: 29 November 1999 (India)
- Recorded: Panchathan Record Inn
- Genre: Film soundtrack
- Label: Venus
- Producer: A. R. Rahman

A. R. Rahman chronology
Thakshak (1999)	Pukar (1999)	Alai Payuthey (2000)

The music is given by A. R. Rahman, while the lyrics were written by Majrooh Sultanpuri for all tracks, except Kay Sera Sera written by Javed Akhtar. The song Kay Sera Sera is based on "Kadhal Niagara" from En Swasa Kaatre. Rahman reused the song "Oh Bosnia" as "Ek Tu Hi Bharosa". The song was composed and performed by Rahman in his Malaysian concert in 1996, that was in aid of Bosnian victims. The piano was played by Rahman himself. "Hai Jaana" has two parts within the film version and soundtrack version. The song "Sunta Hai Mera Khuda" was shot at Arches National Park in Utah, United States. The song " Kismat Se Tum Humko Mile Ho" was shot at Mount Marcus Baker in Alaska, United States.

=== Track list ===
No	Song	Artist(s)	Lyrics	Raga	Length
1	"Kay Sera Sera"	Shankar Mahadevan, Kavita Krishnamurthy	Javed Akhtar	Yaman Kalyan	06:51
2	"Sunta Hai Mera Khuda"	Udit Narayan, Kavita Krishnamurthy, Swarnalatha	Majrooh Sultanpuri		06:36
3	"Humrahi Jab Ho Mastana"	Udit Narayan, Hema Sardesai	Majrooh Sultanpuri		04:26
4	"Hai Jaana" (Soundtrack Version)	Sujatha Mohan	Majrooh Sultanpuri		04:18
5	"Kismat Se Tum"	Sonu Nigam, Anuradha Paudwal	Majrooh Sultanpuri		06:20
6	"Ek Tu Hi Bharosa"	Lata Mangeshkar, Children	Majrooh Sultanpuri		06:29
7	"Hai Jaana"(Film Version)	Sujatha Mohan	Majrooh Sultanpuri		

== Reception ==
Sify gave the film three out of five, writing, "Its ultimately the actors who carry the film through. Not that the plot does not work, in fact its engrossing, but it simply fails to carry you through." V Gangadhar of Rediff.com praised the first half but criticed the second half, writing, "The film falls to pieces in the second half. The action scenes are highly contrived. Abrush tries to project a larger-than-life presence by constantly rolling his huge eyes and grunting with vigour. And Santoshi's handling of the military scenes is rather amateurish. Does the army strip a court-martialled officer even of his clothes?"

== Awards ==
Award	Category	Recipient(s)	Result	Ref(s)
46th Filmfare Awards	Best Actor	Anil Kapoor	Nominated	
46th Filmfare Awards	Best Actress	Madhuri Dixit	Nominated	
2nd IIFA Awards	Best Actor	Anil Kapoor	Nominated	
2nd IIFA Awards	Best Actress	Madhuri Dixit	Nominated	
2nd IIFA Awards	Best Supporting Actress	Namrata Shirodkar	Nominated	
48th National Film Awards	Nargis Dutt Award for Best Feature Film on National Integration	Rajkumar Santoshi	Won	
48th National Film Awards	Best Actor	Anil Kapoor	Won	
7th Screen Awards	Best Actor	Anil Kapoor	Nominated	
7th Screen Awards	Best Actress	Madhuri Dixit	Nominated	
7th Screen Awards	Best Comedian	Rohini Hattangadi	Nominated	
7th Screen Awards	Best Female Playback Singer	Kavita Krishnamurthy for "Kay Sera Sera"	Nominated	
7th Screen Awards	Best Choreography	Prabhu Deva for "Kay Sera Sera"	Nominated	
7th Screen Awards	Best Publicity Design	Himanshu Nanda and Rahul Nanda	Won	
