= Yes Boss (film) =

1997 Indian film by Aziz Mirza

- Poster
- Directed by: Aziz Mirza
- Screenplay by: Mangesh Kulkarni
- Story by: Aziz Mirza
- Produced by: Ratan Jain; Umed Jain; Champak Jain
- Starring: Shah Rukh Khan; Juhi Chawla; Aditya Pancholi
- Cinematography: Harmeet Singh; Thomas A. Xavier
- Edited by: Javed Sayyed
- Music by: Jatin–Lalit
- Production company: Venus Movies
- Distributed by: B4U Films
- Release date: 18 July 1997
- Running time: 165 minutes
- Country: India
- Language: Hindi
- Budget: ₹5 crore
- Box office: ₹23 crore

Yes Boss is a 1997 Indian Hindi-language romantic comedy film directed by Aziz Mirza starring Aditya Pancholi, Shah Rukh Khan and Juhi Chawla in the lead roles. Produced by Ratan Jain, it is based on the film For Love Or Money (1993) starring Michael J Fox.

Yes Boss released on 18 July 1997 and emerged as a commercial super hit at the box-office, with a worldwide gross of ₹23 crore (US$2.4 million). The film received mixed-to-positive reviews from critics upon release, with praise for its humor, soundtrack and the performances of the cast, but criticism for its script and pacing.

At the 43rd Filmfare Awards, Yes Boss received 6 nominations, including Best Actor (Khan), Best Actress (Chawla) and Best Villain (Pancholi), and won Best Male Playback Singer (Abhijeet Bhattacharya for "Main Koi Aisa Geet Gaoon").

Yes Boss partially inspired the Malayalam film Junior Senior (2005) and was remade in Tamil as Guru En Aalu (2009). The rights of the film are owned by Khan's production company Red Chillies Entertainment.

== Plot ==
Ambitious, Rahul Joshi wants to be rich, and is lucky enough to find a job at an advertising agency with extra earnings from his boss, Siddharth, a lustful person having extramarital affairs, who has deviously trapped the rich Sheela for her wealth and the office they work in. Rahul earns overtime money in keeping the affairs a secret. Later, Siddharth is lustfully attracted to the elegant and gorgeous Seema Kapoor, an aspiring model also desiring a life of luxury. Siddharth asks Rahul to help him trap Seema too. Helpless, Rahul does so, but also has a soft spot and a little bit of romantic feelings for her. Anyway due to his efforts, Seema is impressed by Siddharth's personality. Gradually, the two get closer; Seema begins liking Siddharth. However, she also grows close to Rahul while seeking his help.

Siddharth is in trouble when he is carousing with Seema in the city when he is spotted by his suspicious wife Sheela .To hide the truth from Sheela Siddharth blurts out that Seema is Rahul's wife and he is patching them up after a break up. Seema is naturally upset and refuses from seeing Siddharth and meets him after much persuasion from Rahul. Seema confronts Siddharth saying she doesnt want anything to do with him as he hid his marriage from her. Also she makes it clear she doesnt want to build her home with someone after wrecking someone elses.The devious Siddharth convinces the naive Seema that his marriage is already on the rocks and will be divorcing Sheela soon . After the divorce he will marry Seema and she reluctantly agrees. Sheela still suspicious tells Siddharth they need to visit Rahul and Seema at their home and gift them something . Seema is upset when Siddharth asks her and Rahul to act like a married couple . The visit goes smooth but the senstive Seema is shaken with the incidents .Also she is drawn to Rahul's innocence and hard working behavior.

At the advise of his lawyer Siddharth plans to make a move on Seema while the entire unit is on an outdoor shoot in Switzerland. Bhushan Gulshan Grover Seema's first cousin has been eyeing Seema'a wealth and a role in the office for so long and Siddharth has been a thorn in his side. Siddharth also hates Bhushans overbearing attitude and his efforts to breach into his space at the office . Being suspicious of Siddharth he makes sure Seema reaches Switzerland as a surprise. Siddharths attempts to woo Seema fails due to presence of Sheela and it doesnt take long for Bhushan to connect the dots . He makes an offer to Rahul to side with him and Rahul rebuffs him . In retaliation to the slight Bhushan leaks info of his marriage to Rahul's Mom , Sonali who is a heart patient .

Sonali, a heart patient is sensitive to any shocking news in life. To not shock her, Rahul and Seema act as a happy couple and slowly grow even closer and after a bit of arguments they start falling in love with each other. Siddharth learns about them and joins hands with Bhushan in exchange for the office he had planned for Rahul . He offers Rahul his dream office (just a ruse to win Seema) , with unsaid implication that it was in return for Seema. Siddharth plans to oust Rahul as soon as he gets Seema back and hand the office to Bhushan.Rahul realises his love for Seema is far greater than his love for his dream office. Seema also decides she needs to return back to Rahul and the climax has a fight between Bhushan , Siddharth and Rahul . Siddharth threatens he will reveal everything to Rahuls mother who appears and says she has been hearing the conversation and she is willing to accept Seema as her daughter in law.

After this fiasco, true love triumphs as Seema decides to spend her life with Rahul and Sonali, who wholeheartedly accepts their relationship again. Rahul decides he'd have a luxurious life for him and Seema by his own money, not by bootlicking anyone. The story/movie ends with the two on a scooter and reminiscing of how they met and it shows them driving off with "Don't Worry, Get Married" written on a plate in the back of the scooter. The end credits roll and play Main Koi Aisa Geet Gaoon until halfway of it and the actual movie finally ends.

== Cast ==
- Shahrukh Khan as Rahul Joshi
- Juhi Chawla as Seema Kapoor
- Aditya Pancholi as Siddharth Chaudhary
- Kashmera Shah as Sheela Chaudhary
- Kulbhushan Kharbanda as JD Choudhary, the father-in-law of Siddharth Chaudhary.
- Gulshan Grover as Bhushan
- Ashok Saraf as Johnny
- Johnny Lever as Madhav Advani / Mr. Mad
- Reema Lagoo as Sonali Joshi, Rahul's mother.
- Mahavir Shah as Advocate Arvind Shukla
- Rakesh Bedi as Watchman at Girls hostel / Bahadur Kaushik Chopra
- Anant Mahadevan as Mahendra Shastri
- Amrit Patel as Dharia
- Shashi Kiran as Sadanand
- Sheela Sharma as Jyoti
- Ajay Wadhavkar as Vinayak
- Joginder Shelly as Hakim Singh

== Production ==
"Main Koi Aisa Geet" song was shot in Bern, Switzerland.

== Music ==
Yes Boss

Soundtrack album by Jatin–Lalit
- Released: 9 May 1997
- Genre: Feature film soundtrack
- Length: 30:21
- Label: Venus Records & Tapes
- Producer: Jatin–Lalit

Jatin–Lalit chronology
Tum Jiyo Hazaro Saal (1997)	Yes Boss (1997)	Badadin (1998)

The film's soundtrack has 6 songs composed by Jatin–Lalit who also composed the background score, with lyrics by Javed Akhtar. Most of the songs are sung by Abhijeet Bhattacharya and won his first Filmfare Award for Best Male Playback Singer for the song "Main Koi Aisa Geet Gaoon". Other contributing artists are Kumar Sanu, Udit Narayan & Alka Yagnik. The song "Suniye To" is based on "Ahla Ma Feki" by Hisham Abbas. The song "Ek din aap" is inspired from Dilip Kumar song "Sham-e-gham ki Qasam" from the movie "Footpath" (1953).

#	Title	Singer(s)	Length
1.	"Chaand Taare"	Abhijeet	04:48
2.	"Choodi Baji Hai"	Udit Narayan, Alka Yagnik	05:05
3.	"Ek Din Aap"	Kumar Sanu, Alka Yagnik	04:30
4.	"Jaata Hai Tu Kahan"	Abhijeet	04:41
5.	"Main Koi Aisa Geet Gaoon"	Abhijeet, Alka Yagnik	05:11
6.	"Suniye To"	Abhijeet	05:12

== Reception ==
K. N. Vijiyan of New Straits Times wrote that "with bubbly Shahrukh Khan at his best, you cannot afford to give this film a miss".

== Box office ==
Yes Boss grossed ₹19.48 crore (US$2.0 million) in India and $975,000 (₹3.48 crore) in other countries, for a worldwide total of ₹22.96 crore (US$2.4 million), against its ₹5 crore (US$520,000) budget. It had a worldwide opening weekend of ₹3.07 crore (US$320,000), and grossed ₹5.65 crore (US$590,000) in its first week. It is the 12th-highest-grossing Indian film of 1997 worldwide.

=== India ===
It opened on Friday, 18 July 1997, across 180 screens, and earned ₹57 lakh (US$59,000) nett on its opening day. It grossed ₹1.79 crore (US$190,000) nett in its opening weekend, and had a first week of ₹3.29 crore (US$340,000) nett. The film earned a total of ₹11.33 crore (US$1.2 million) nett, and was declared a "Hit" by Box Office India. It is the 14th-highest-grossing film of 1997 in India.

=== Overseas ===
It earned $975,000 (₹3.48 crore) outside India. It is the 3rd-highest-grossing film of 1997 behind Dil To Pagal Hai ($3.3 million (₹12.04 crore)) and Pardes ($1.7 million (₹6.12 crore)), which were also Shah Rukh Khan starrers.

== Awards ==
43rd Filmfare Awards:

Won

- Best Male Playback Singer – Abhijeet Bhattacharya for "Main Koi Aisa Geet Gaoon"

Nominated

- Best Actor – Shahrukh Khan
- Best Actress – Juhi Chawla
- Best Villain – Aditya Pancholi
- Best Music Director – Jatin–Lalit
- Best Lyricist – Javed Akhtar for "Chaand Taare"
