= Anil Devgan =

Indian film director (1969–2020)

Anil P. Devgan
- Born: 25 May 1969; Bombay, Maharashtra, India
- Died: 5 October 2020 (aged 51); Mumbai, Maharashtra, India
- Occupations: Film director; screenwriter
- Years active: 1996–2020
- Parent: Prem Prakash Devgan (father)
- Relatives: Ajay Devgn (cousin)
- Family: See Devgan family

Anil Devgan (25 May 1969 – 5 October 2020) was an Indian filmmaker and screenwriter, the son of Prem Prakash Devgan, and the first cousin of actor Ajay Devgan. He directed films such as Raju Chacha and Blackmail. He died at the age of 51 due to cardiac arrest on the night of 5 October 2020.

== Personal life ==
His father was Prem Prakash Devgan. His paternal uncle was filmmaker, Veeru Devgan father of actor Ajay Devgn, Kavita and Neelam. He studied in Kendriya Vidyalaya in Delhi. From a young age, he had a creative mind fascinated by stories and had the passion to tell them. He was an avid music lover and was trained in tabla and martial arts. After graduating in 1989 from Shaheed Bhagat Singh College in New Delhi, he joined the film industry after being encouraged by Ajay and assisted on many movies with directors Sunil Agnihotri, Anees Bazmee and Raj Kanwar before making his debut as a director in 2000. He was married and had one son.

== Filmography ==
Year	Title	Notes
1996	Jeet	Assistant director
1996	Jaan	Assistant director
1997	Itihaas	Assistant director
1998	Pyaar To Hona Hi Tha	Assistant director
1999	Hindustan Ki Kasam	
2000	Raju Chacha	Director
2005	Blackmail	Director
2008	Haal-e-dil	Director
2012	Son of Sardaar	Creative director
