= Phir Bhi Dil Hai Hindustani =

2000 Indian film by Aziz Mirza

- Directed by: Aziz Mirza
- Written by: Manoj Lalwani; Raaj Kumar Dahima
- Dialogues by: Sanjay Chhel
- Produced by: Shah Rukh Khan; Juhi Chawla; Aziz Mirza
- Starring: Shah Rukh Khan; Juhi Chawla; Paresh Rawal
- Cinematography: Santosh Sivan
- Edited by: Javed Sayyed
- Music by: Jatin–Lalit
- Production company: Dreamz Unlimited
- Distributed by: Eros International
- Release date: 21 January 2000
- Running time: 166 minutes
- Country: India
- Language: Hindi
- Budget: ₹13 crores
- Box office: ₹25.46 crores

Phir Bhi Dil Hai Hindustani (transl. Yet, The Heart is Indian) is a 2000 Indian Hindi-language satire film directed by Aziz Mirza and produced by Dreamz Unlimited. The film stars Shah Rukh Khan and Juhi Chawla in the lead roles, with Paresh Rawal, Johnny Lever, Govind Namdev, Satish Shah, Dalip Tahil, Mahavir Shah, Shakti Kapoor, and Neena Kulkarni in supporting roles. The title of the film is derived from the song "Mera Joota Hai Japani" from the 1955 film Shree 420. The film marked the debut production venture of Khan, Chawla, and Mirza under their production company, Dreamz Unlimited.

== Plot ==
Ajay Bakshi, an ambitious and outspoken reporter for KTV, thrives on sensationalism to boost ratings. His rival, Ria Banerjee of Galaxy TV, is assigned to undermine him. Meanwhile, a small-time gangster, Pappu Junior alias Choti, struggles for recognition within his gang. Ajay recruits Choti to stage a fake on-air attack on politician Ramakant Dua’s brother-in-law, Madanlal Gupta, to generate publicity. However, the plan spirals out of control when Madanlal is genuinely murdered by Mohan Joshi, who is immediately branded a terrorist by the authorities.

As the murder case proceeds, Ajay and Ria begin to befriend each other, with Ajay in particular developing a soft spot for her despite their constant bickering and always looking out for her safety in dangerous situations.

As riots erupt across the city, they cover the unrest and gradually set aside their rivalry. When Mohan escapes custody and confronts them, he reveals that he killed Madanlal to avenge his daughter, who had been raped and murdered by him, and that he had been denied justice because of Madanlal’s political influence. Moved by his story, Ajay and Ria decide to expose the truth. They record Mohan’s confession and attempt to broadcast it. In return, Mohan helps them realise their love for each other. However, they are deceived by their media superiors and corrupt politicians, who confiscate the tape to protect their own interests.

Mohan is recaptured and sentenced to death. Realising they have been manipulated, Ajay and Ria devise a plan to retrieve the confession tape. They go to the farmhouse where the tape is being kept and successfully steal it with the help of Choti before escaping by car. The following scenes depict their car chase and eventual escape from the ministers’ men. In the meantime, the police raid both of their houses. Exhausted, Ajay and Ria return to Ajay’s house to transfer the tape, only to find the police outside, forcing them to hide behind a wall. After the police leave, Ria, still in Ajay’s arms, is visibly shaken and exhausted, prompting Ajay to comfort her and tell her not to worry. He kisses her forehead and holds her close as the night passes.

They successfully broadcast the confession shortly before the execution, appealing directly to the public. Their report sparks mass protests, forcing the authorities to halt the execution. The ensuing public outcry leads to the downfall of the corrupt politicians and media figures. Mohan is saved, and Ria proposes to Ajay, which he accepts, and they share a hug as the film ends.

== Cast ==
- Shah Rukh Khan as Ajay Bakshi, a reporter for KTV Channel
- Juhi Chawla as Ria Banerjee, a reporter of Galaxy TV Channel
- Paresh Rawal as Mohan Joshi
- Johnny Lever as Choti / Pappu Junior
- Atul Parchure as Shahid Akram
- Sanjay Mishra as Bomb Defuser
- Sharat Saxena as Pappu's boss
- Aanjjan Srivastav as Police Commissioner
- Neena Kulkarni as Laxmi Joshi, Mohan's wife
- Ruma Rajni as Kavita Joshi, Mohan and Laxmi's daughter
- Dalip Tahil as Shenoy, Head of Galaxy TV Channel and Ria's boss
- Satish Shah as Kaka, Head of KTV Channel and Ajay's boss
- Govind Namdev as Chief Minister Mushran
- Shakti Kapoor as Minister Ramakant Dua
- Mahavir Shah as Madanlal Gupta, Ramakant's brother-in-law
- Bharti Achrekar as Mrs. Neha Banerjee, Ria's mother
- Smita Jaykar as Mrs. Sudeepa Bakshi, Ajay's mother
- Vishwajeet Pradhan as Police Inspector
- Dilip Joshi as Sapney, Choti's aide
- Mona Ambegaonkar as Shalini Bahl
- Sheeba Chaddha as Anushka Roy
- Kamya Punjabi as Mary
- Hyder Ali as Mr. Bakshi, Ajay's father.
- Syed Badr-ul Hasan Khan Bahadur

== Music ==
Phir Bhi Dil Hai Hindustani

Studio album by Jatin–Lalit
- Released: 21 January 2000
- Recorded: 1999
- Genre: Feature film soundtrack
- Length: 33:26
- Label: Sony Music
- Producer: Jatin–Lalit

Jatin–Lalit chronology
Mohabbatein (2000)	Phir Bhi Dil Hai Hindustani (2000)	Raja Ko Rani Se Pyar Ho Gaya (2000)
External audio
- Audio Jukebox on YouTube

Professional ratings
Review scores
Source	Rating
Planet Bollywood	8.5/10 stars

The music was composed by Jatin–Lalit who also composed the background score assisted by their brother-in-law Aadesh Shrivastava. All of the lyrics were written by Javed Akhtar. The music of the film was highly appreciated by critics and the audience alike. Manish Dhamija of Planet Bollywood gave 8.5 stars stating, "Overall, the album is a pleasant surprise from Jatin-Lalit". The soundtrack and the song "Phir Bhi Dil Hai Hindustani" in particular, with its concept of "Love our country", was well-received and praised for its patriotism. Author M. J. Akbar highlighted the "very heavy winking" by Khan during his performance of the song, accompanying the evocative lyrics.

=== Track listing ===
No.	Title	Singer(s)	Length
1.	"Phir Bhi Dil Hai Hindustani"	Udit Narayan	04:01
2.	"I'm the Best" (Male Version)	Abhijeet Bhattacharya	04:19
3.	"I'm the Best" (Female Version)	Jaspinder Narula	04:19
4.	"Banke Tera Jogi"	Sonu Nigam, Alka Yagnik, Lalit Pandit	04:43
5.	"Vande Mataram"	Shankar Mahadevan	04:39
6.	"Kuch To Bata"	Abhijeet Bhattacharya, Alka Yagnik	04:32
7.	"Aur Kya"	Abhijeet Bhattacharya, Alka Yagnik	05:04
8.	"Aao Na Aao Na"	Jatin Pandit	01:53

== Box office ==
Phir Bhi Dil Hai Hindustani grossed ₹18.20 crore (US$1.9 million) in India and $1.67 million (₹7.26 crore) in other countries, for a worldwide total of ₹25.46 crore (US$2.7 million), against its ₹13 crore (US$1.4 million) budget. It had a worldwide opening weekend of ₹7.45 crore (US$800,000), and grossed ₹12.50 crore (US$1.3 million) in its first week. It is the 13th-highest-grossing Bollywood film of 2000 worldwide.

On Up Close & Personal with PZ, Shah Rukh Khan said that the film "was the biggest failure for Juhi [Chawla], Aziz [Mirza], and him".

=== India ===
It opened on Friday, 21 January 2000, across 240 screens, and earned ₹91 lakh (US$97,000) nett on its opening day. It grossed ₹2.74 crore (US$290,000) nett in its opening weekend, and had a first week of ₹5.08 crore (US$540,000) nett. The film earned a total of ₹10.74 crore (US$1.1 million)

=== Overseas ===
It had an opening weekend of $650,000 (₹2.82 crore) and went on to gross $900,000 (₹3.91 crore) in its first week. The film earned a total of $1.67 million (₹7.26 crore) at the end of its theatrical run.

'Phir Bhi Dil Hai Hindustani' worldwide collections breakdown
Territory	Territory wise Collections break-up
India	Nett Gross: ₹10.74 crore (US$1.1 million)
India	Distributor share: ₹5.57 crore (US$600,000)
India	Total Gross: ₹18.20 crore (US$1.9 million)
International (Outside India)	$1.67 million (₹7.26 crore)
Worldwide	₹25.46 crore (US$2.7 million)

== Awards and nominations ==
Awards	Category	Recipients and nominees	Results
International Indian Film Academy Awards	Best Special Effects	Dreamz Unlimited	Won
International Indian Film Academy Awards	Best Comedian	Johnny Lever	Nominated
Filmfare Awards	Best Comedian	Johnny Lever	Nominated
Screen Awards	Best Comedian	Johnny Lever	Nominated

== See also ==
- Mera Joota Hai Japani
