= Screen Award for Best Special Effects =

Annual film award in India

The Screen Award for Best Special Effects is chosen by a distinguished panel of judges from the Indian Bollywood film industry and the winners are announced in January.

== Winners ==
Year	Winner	Film
2017	NY VFXWALA	Shivaay
2015	NY VFXWALA (A division of Ajay Devgn FFilms)	Bajirao Mastani
2014	Red Chillies VFX	Krrish 3
2012	Red Chillies VFX, Keitan Yadav & Haresh Hingorani	Ra.One
2011	V. Srinivas Mohan	Robot
2010	Charles Darby	Aladin
2009	Biju D - Pix n Trix	Bhootnath
2008	Red Chillies VFX	Om Shanti Om
2007	-	-
2006	-	-
2005	-	-
2004	-	Koi... Mil Gaya
2003	-	-
2002	-	-
2001	Maya Entertainment Limited	Raju Chacha

== See also ==
- Screen Awards
