= Dhai Akshar Prem Ke =

2000 film by Raj Kanwar

Dhaai Akshar Prem Ke
- Poster
- Directed by: Raj Kanwar
- Written by: Raj Kanwar; Jainendra Jain; Ratna Rajaia
- Based on: Four Steps in the Clouds by Piero Tellini; Cesare Zavattini; Vittorio de Benedetti
- Produced by: Raj Kanwar; K. Pappu; Amardeep Singh
- Starring: Abhishek Bachchan; Aishwarya Rai
- Cinematography: Ishwar R. Bidri
- Edited by: Kuldeep Mehan
- Music by: Songs: Jatin–Lalit; Score: Naresh Sharma
- Release date: 29 September 2000
- Running time: 167 minutes
- Country: India
- Language: Hindi
- Budget: ₹9 crore
- Box office: ₹16.30 crore

Dhaai Akshar Prem Ke (transl. Two and half letters of Love) is a 2000 Indian Hindi-language romantic drama film written and directed by Raj Kanwar. It was the first of seven films which starred real-life couple Abhishek Bachchan and Aishwarya Rai. The film is a remake of the 1995 American film A Walk in the Clouds, which itself is a remake of the 1942 Italian film Quattro passi fra le nuvole (Four Steps in the Clouds).

== Plot ==
Sahiba is an intelligent, shy, and sensitive girl attending a college far from home. She belongs to a Rajput family in which tradition requires that a girl give her consent readily to marry the man chosen by her family. But being a girl of contemporary times, Sahiba refuses to submit to age-old traditions. To avoid an arranged marriage, she tells a lie that she is already married. This angers her father, Yogi Grewal. The fake husband is a handsome army captain, Karan Khanna. The two meet at a train station after Karan saves Sahiba from a group of men who are trying to kill her; Sahiba explains that she had witnessed a murder, and the murderer had sent his men after her. Karan, learning Sahiba's plight, decides to escort her home and help her explain matters to her family. Once home, the family mistakes Karan for Sahiba's husband. Karan and Sahiba try but fail to tell the truth.

Sahiba's family takes a great liking to Karan. Sahiba's father, however, does not. At first, Karan is anxious to get out of the situation and go meet his friend Nisha whom he had fallen in love with but had not seen for a year. However, being an orphan, Karan soon gets carried away by the love and affection Sahiba's family showers him with. Meanwhile, Sahiba has fallen in love with Karan. Following a misunderstanding in which the family celebrated Sahiba's and Karan's pregnancy (which did not occur), Karan decides that he should walk out. Before he can, though, a distressed Sahiba tells Karan that she loves him and begs him not to leave. He leaves anyway.

Upon meeting Nisha, he discovers that she has already married and has never taken him for more than a friend. Meanwhile, Yogi, who had finally taken a liking to Karan after learning of the "pregnancy," is angry that Karan left and even more enraged when Sahiba tells him that she and Karan were never married. Karan is overcome with grief and guilt for having left Sahiba for Nisha when Nisha did not love him. In the shock of discovering Nisha's marriage, he also discovers that he had fallen in love with Sahiba but had been too focused on Nisha to realize it. He decides to go back to Sahiba's house and apologize. Upon entering, Yogi berates him and after revealing that he has arranged Sahiba's engagement to another young man, he tells Karan to leave and never come back.

Meanwhile, Sahiba is distressed to find out that the man she is engaged to, had murdered a girl at Sahiba's college hostel - the very murderer whose men Karan had rescued her from. She explains this to her father, but he does not believe her; the young man in question, Vicky, happens to be the son of a family friend, Rai Singhal. Singhal reveals his true colors when Yogi overhears him telling his son that they would use Sahiba to inherit her father's money, then they would get rid of her. Karan, who had been reunited with Sahiba by her uncle Raunaq and had been told who Vicky was beaten, arrives at the scene and a brutal fight begins. It ends with Yogi and Karan captured and trapped in Singhal's warehouse, which Singhal and his henchmen have set on fire in order to ensure that Vicky and Sahiba's wedding will not be disrupted. Karan and Yogi struggle to escape the fire.

In the meantime, the wedding takes place. Sahiba is so overcome with grief and stress that she swallows poison. Before the wedding is complete, Yogi and Karan arrive and beat down Singhal, Vicky, and their henchmen. Before everyone can celebrate, though, Sahiba faints. They rush her to the hospital; Karan refuses to leave her bedside while she's unconscious and tells her that he loves her. Soon she wakes up, and the doctors declare her safe. Yogi declares that Karan and Sahiba are meant for each other.

The last scene shows the family ushering a visibly pregnant Sahiba out of the house and into a car. Karan quiets everyone down, shouts that it's going to be a girl, and lifts Sahiba up and carries her away.

== Cast ==
- Abhishek Bachchan as Captain Karan Khanna
- Aishwarya Rai as Sahiba Grewal Khanna
- Dalip Tahil as Rai Bahadur Tejeshwar Singhal
- Amrish Puri as Yogvendra "Yogi" Grewal
- Anupam Kher as Raunaq Grewal
- Shakti Kapoor as Pritam Grewal
- Supriya Karnik as Monica P. Grewal
- Sushma Seth as Yogi's mom
- Inder Sudan as Vickey Singhal (Tejeshwar's son)
- Tanvi Azmi as Simran Grewal
- Himani Shivpuri as Sweety S. Grewal
- Sonali Bendre as Nisha
- Hrishikesh Pandey as Sameer (Sam) (Nisha's husband)
- Salman Khan as Truck Driver Prem (special appearance)

== Soundtrack ==
The songs were composed by Jatin–Lalit. The lyrics were penned by Sameer. All the songs were sung by Anuradha Paudwal along with Babul Supriyo, KK & Sudesh Bhosle

| # | Title | Singer(s) | Length |
|---|---|---|---|
| 1 | "Koi Taza Hawa" | Babul Supriyo, Anuradha Paudwal | 05:00 |
| 2 | "Dhai Akshar Prem Ke" | Babul Supriyo, Anuradha Paudwal | 04:48 |
| 3 | "Yeh Sama Yeh Nazare" | Babul Supriyo, Anuradha Paudwal | 06:18 |
| 4 | "Ek Haseen Ladki" | Babul Supriyo, Sudesh Bhosle, Anuradha Paudwal | 04:26 |
| 5 | "Hai Deewana Ye Ishq Mera" | Babul Supriyo, Anuradha Paudwal | 05:00 |
| 6 | "Mere Mahi Bada Sohna" | Abhishek Bachchan, Anuradha Paudwal | 06:24 |
| 7 | "Do Lafzo Mein" | Babul Supriyo, Anuradha Paudwal | 04:58 |
| 8 | "O Mere Rabba" | KK, Anuradha Paudwal | 05:04 |

== Production ==
Some parts of the film were shot in Switzerland.

== Reception ==
Taran Adarsh of Bollywood Hungama rated the film one out of five stars and wrote that On the whole, DHAAI AKSHAR PREM KE lacks a cohesive script and hit music to compliment this love story". A critic from Rediff.com wrote that "Dhaai Akshar Prem Ke might have been interesting if Raj Kanwar hadn't quite crammed so much into it -- dream sequences, large family drama et al". K. N. Vijiyan of New Straits Times wrote that "The movie stars well enough in the great outdoors. We get a sense of adventure, although it is shortlived".
