= Champak Jain =

Indian film producer (c. 1967 – 2019)

- Born: 29 May 1967
- Died: 31 October 2019 (aged 52)
- Occupation: Film producer

Champak Jain (c. 1967 – 31 October 2019) was an Indian film producer and owner of Venus Records & Tapes Pvt Ltd. Co-founded with his brothers, the company emerged in the early 1990s as one of India's major producers of Hindi films.

== Biography ==
Jain was the owner of Venus Records & Tapes Pvt Ltd. He produced films like Khiladi (1992), Baazigar (1993), Main Khiladi Tu Anari (1994), Josh (2000), Humraaz (2002), Hulchul (2004) and more. He died on 31 October 2019 at the age of 52.

== Selected filmography ==
- Khiladi (1992)
- Baazigar (1993)
- Main Khiladi Tu Anari (1994)
- Yes Boss (1997)
- Josh (2000)
- Humraaz (2002)
- Hungama (2003)
- Hulchul (2004)
- Aap Ki Khatir (2006)
- Maan Gaye Mughal-e-Azam (2008)
- De Dana Dan (2009)
- Kis Kisko Pyaar Karoon (2015)
