= Kya Kehna =

2000 Indian film by Kundan Shah

Kya Kehna!
- Directed by: Kundan Shah
- Written by: Honey Irani
- Screenplay by: Honey Irani
- Produced by: Kumar S Taurani; Ramesh S Taurani
- Starring: Preity Zinta; Saif Ali Khan; Chandrachur Singh; Anupam Kher; Farida Jalal
- Cinematography: Rajesh Joshi
- Edited by: Javed Sayyed
- Music by: Rajesh Roshan
- Production company: Tips Industries
- Release date: 19 May 2000
- Running time: 155 minutes
- Country: India
- Language: Hindi
- Budget: ₹40 million
- Box office: ₹211.7 million

Kya Kehna (English: What to say?/ What can I say?) is a 2000 Indian Hindi-language romantic drama film directed by Kundan Shah. It was released on 19 May 2000. Kya Kehna dealt with the taboo issue of premarital pregnancy and society views on the same, and stars Preity Zinta in the central role as a single teenage mother, with Saif Ali Khan, Chandrachur Singh, Farida Jalal and Anupam Kher in supporting roles. The music was composed by Rajesh Roshan.

Upon its theatrical release, it was positively reviewed by critics. Zinta's performance and Irani's storywriting were highlighted. It was an unexpected success earning ₹21.8 crore (US$2.3 million) worldwide. At the 46th Filmfare Awards, Irani won in the Best Story category, with Zinta and Singh receiving nominations for Best Actress and Best Supporting Actor, respectively.

== Plot ==
Priya Bakshi is the bubbly, free-spirited daughter of Gulshan and Rohini Bakshi. Priya's parents, brothers, and best friend Ajay love and support her. Ajay is secretly in love with Priya and wishes to marry her in the future.

Priya enters her first year of university and quickly catches the eye of wealthy playboy Rahul, who becomes attracted to her. She succumbs to his charm but Ajay and her brother Vicky are unsure about Rahul. His reputation and womanizing ways worry them, and they warn her to stay away from him. However, Priya believes that Rahul is in love with her, and the two begin a relationship and have sex. Priya convinces her parents to meet Rahul, but when they prematurely talk about marriage and the future, he mocks them and leaves Priya. Priya is heartbroken but tries to move on with her life. She later learns that she is pregnant with Rahul's child. Her parents go back to Rahul to talk about marriage once again. He acknowledges that he is the father but still does not want to marry Priya. Rahul's mother also berates Priya's family, believing that they are looking for financial compensation. Priya is faced with a decision, and she chooses to keep the child. Her decision prompts her father to willfully banish her from the house due to the shame, much against the rest of her family's will. Alone and neglected, Priya is devastated. The rest of her family tries to bring her back but Gulshan consistently prevents them from doing so. However, Gulshan eventually feels the absence of Priya himself, realising how hard it is to live without her and agrees with the rest of the family to bring her back, supporting her during her pregnancy.

Priya goes back to university, where she is shunned due to her pregnancy and 'spoiled' character. Rahul's mother, who is part of the university's board of directors, tries to convince the other parents that Priya should be expelled due to her character. Ostracised by friends, neighbours, and society, Priya realises Ajay's love and dedication for her.

The university holds a year-end performance, where a group of students perform a play that ridicules and vilifies Priya and her pregnancy. After the play, Priya makes a passionate speech about love, honour, and respect. She tells the audience about how she isn't the only one to blame for her pregnancy, and how she decided to let her baby live and enjoy life. Her words move many in the audience, including Rahul. Her friends apologise to her, and she gains the support of the community. Later, Ajay declares his love for Priya and desires to marry her. However, Priya worries whether Ajay will accept her and her unborn child. Ajay tells her he is fully willing to accept both her and her child as his own. Unknown to Priya and Ajay, a remorseful Rahul approaches Priya's family and reveals he is ready to apologise and raise his and Priya's child together, to which they agree. Priya's water breaks before she can answer Ajay's proposal and she goes to the hospital to give birth, where she's joined by Rahul and her family.

At an event to celebrate the birth of Priya's baby, Rahul proposes to her, stating that he is ready for marriage and to raise their child. Ajay wishes them well and begins to walk away. However, Priya rejects Rahul and confesses her love for Ajay, asking him whether he's still willing to accept her and her child. Ajay agrees to this. Rahul accepts Priya's decision, wishes them well, and leaves.

== Cast ==
- Preity Zinta as Priya Bakshi; a teenage single mother and rahul’s ex-girlfriend
- Saif Ali Khan as Rahul Modi; Priya’s ex-boyfriend
- Chandrachur Singh as Ajay Sharma; Priya’s secret lover and bestfriend
- Anupam Kher as Gulshan Bakshi
- Farida Jalal as Rohini Bakshi
- Rita Bhaduri as Ajay's Mother
- Mamik Singh as Vicky (Priya's brother)
- Puneet Vashisht as Kabir (Priya's brother)
- Nivedita Bhattacharya as Neena (Priya's sister-in-law)
- Amit Mistry as Bobby (Priya's brother)
- Navneet Nishan as Tara Seth (Rahul's mother)
- Rajeev Verma as Rahul's Father
- Deven Verma as Rustom
- Suresh Chatwal as Gulati, school's Vice Principal
- Rohitash Gaud as College Student participating in Drama (Guest role)

== Music ==
Kya Kehna

Soundtrack album by Rajesh Roshan
- Released: 2000
- Recorded: 1997/98
- Genre: Film soundtrack
- Length: 45:05
- Label: Tips Music Films
- Producer: Rajesh Roshan

The soundtrack of the film contains 8 songs. The music is given by Rajesh Roshan, with lyrics by Majrooh Sultanpuri. According to the Indian trade website Box Office India, with around 20,00,000 units sold, this film's soundtrack album was the year's seventh highest-selling. The title song "Kya Kehna" is copied from Neil Sedaka's Single "Oh! Carol".

Hindi track list
No.	Title	Artist(s)	Length
1.	"Aye Dil Laya Hai Bahaar"	Kavita Krishnamurthy, Hariharan	4:11
2.	"Dekhiye Aji Jaaneman"	Alka Yagnik, Udit Narayan	5:30
3.	"Aye Sanam Meri Baahon Mein"	Alka Yagnik, Kumar Sanu	6:13
4.	"Jaaneman Jaane Jaan"	Alka Yagnik, Sonu Nigam	5:35
5.	"O Soniye Dil Jaaniye"	Alka Yagnik, Kumar Sanu, Sonu Nigam	5:35
6.	"In Kadmon Ke Neeche"	Alka Yagnik, Kumar Sanu	5:17
7.	"Dil Ka Koi Tukda"	Kavita Krishnamurthy, Hariharan	6:15
8.	"Pyaara Bhaiya Mera"	Alka Yagnik, Kumar Sanu	4:41
9.	"Aye Dil Laya Hai Bahaar" (Slow)	Kavita Krishnamurthy, Hariharan	1:52
Total length:			45:05

== Reception ==
=== Box office ===
The film was a box office success and emerged as one of the highest-grossing Bollywood films of 2000, and was called a "super hit" by Box Office India. The film's success was unexpected, and it was therefore described as a sleeper hit.

=== Critical reception ===
Vinayak Chakravorty of Hindustan Times gave the film 3 out of 5 stars, writing, "The basic premise of Kya Kehna!, then, definitely had the potential of being a gripping family entertainer. Unfortunately, somewhere down the line, you feel as if most people associated with the film somehow lost interest." He noted, however, Zinta as "the bright spot of the film". Aradhika Sekhon of The Tribune wrote, "The film itself has several flaws but the issues that it tackles are real. The director takes a straight, hard look at the problems of today and holds them up for exhibition. The Indian tendency is to sweep uncomfortable issues under the carpet but if films like Kya Kehna! continue to be made, at least, we'll be forced to confront them." Mimmy Jain of The Indian Express, in a positive review, commended Shah for making "a sensitive film, on a sensitive subject", calling Kya Kehna "a film that should have been made years ago". She further noted Zinta as being "dazzlingly good" in her part.

Filmfare, in a three-star review, wrote that the film is "worth a watch" and attributed its success to Zinta's "very convincing performance". Sharmila Taliculam from Rediff.com was critical of the film, concluding, "Apart from the climax, the film is no big deal." Namita Nivas of Screen shared similar sentiments, writing that "there is nothing unusual or different about Kya Kehna as the makers have been claiming for a long time", but she, too, praised Zinta for her "brilliant performance".

== Awards ==
46th Filmfare Awards:

Won

- Best Story – Honey Irani

Nominated

- Best Actress – Preity Zinta
- Best Supporting Actor – Chandrachur Singh

2nd IIFA Awards:

Won

- Best Screenplay – Honey Irani

Nominated

- Best Film – Ramesh S. Taurani & Kumar S. Taurani
- Best Actress – Preity Zinta
- Best Supporting Actor – Chandrachur Singh
- Best Female Playback Singer – Kavita Krishnamurthy for "Ae Dil Laya Hai Bahaar"
- Best Story – Honey Irani
