= Raja Ko Rani Se Pyar Ho Gaya =

2000 Indian Hindi film

- Directed by: T.K. Rajeev Kumar
- Written by: Ramachandra Shelke; Mankesh Kulkarni (dialogues)
- Story by: T. K. Rajeev Kumar
- Produced by: Good Knight Mohan
- Starring: Arvind Swamy; Manisha Koirala
- Cinematography: Ravi K. Chandran
- Edited by: A. Sreekar Prasad
- Music by: Songs: Jatin–Lalit; Background Score: Sharreth
- Production companies: Shogun Films; Lopa Mudra Creations
- Release date: 22 December 2000
- Country: India
- Language: Hindi
- Budget: ₹ 4,75 crore
- Box office: ₹ 64,87 lakh

Raja Ko Rani Se Pyar Ho Gaya (transl. The king has fallen in love with the queen) is a 2000 Indian Hindi film directed by T. K. Rajeev Kumar, starring Arvind Swamy and Manisha Koirala. This is the second Hindi film after Saat Rang Ke Sapne that Arvind Swamy has ever acted in. The film commenced after the success of the Hindi version of Mani Ratnam's Bombay, which featured the same lead pair. However, the release was delayed by three years, until the producers won a PETA case filed against them.

== Cast ==
- Arvind Swamy as Mohit Kumar
- Manisha Koirala as Manisha Malhotra
- Dilip Dhawan as Rohit Kumar
- Vanessa Francis as Raji
- Jennifer Winget as Tanu
- Dina Pathak as Mohit's grandmother
- Shahbaz Khan
- Nawab Shah
- Sushma Seth as Manisha's mother
- Tanvi Azmi as Meera Kumar
- Rakesh Bedi as Balu

== Production ==
Producer Mohan encouraged Rajeev to do this film in Hindi as this plot would have a wider market and Rajeev felt this won't work out in Malayalam because of the fantasy element in the script.

== Controversy ==
The film became controversial for the scene where Manisha plays with the elephant's tail.

== Music ==
Given by Jatin–Lalit, with lyrics by Javed Akhtar, audio on T-Series.

| # | Title | Singer(s) | Length |
|---|---|---|---|
| 1 | "Aao Sune Laheron Se" | Srinivas, Anuradha Paudwal | 06:03 |
| 2 | "To Rabba Ki Kariye" | Sukhwinder Singh | 03:53 |
| 3 | "Dil Chura Ke Chal Dee" | Udit Narayan | 05:24 |
| 4 | "Jiske Liye Sapno Mein Tum Ho" | Srinivas, Anuradha Paudwal | 06:07 |
| 5 | "Dost Hai Hamare" | Abhijeet | 04:41 |
| 6 | "Sun Lo Re Bandhu" | Udit Narayan, Aditya Narayan | 05:01 |
| 7 | "Dil Chura Ke Chal Dee" (Instrumental) | | 04:22 |
| 8 | "Aao Sune Lehron Se" (Instrumental) | | 06:02 |
