= Josh (2000 film) =

2000 Indian film by Mansoor Khan

- Film poster
- Directed by: Mansoor Khan
- Screenplay by: Mansoor Khan; Neeraj Vora
- Dialogues by: Neeraj Vora Aatish Kapadia Nidhi Tuli
- Story by: Mansoor Khan
- Based on: West Side Story by Jerome Robbins
- Produced by: Ganesh Jain; Ratan Jain; Champak Jain
- Starring: Shah Rukh Khan; Chandrachur Singh; Aishwarya Rai; Sharad Kapoor; Priya Gill
- Cinematography: K. V. Anand
- Edited by: Dilip Kotalgi; Zafar Sultan
- Music by: Songs: Anu Malik; Background Score: Anjan Biswas
- Production company: Venus Films
- Distributed by: B4U Films
- Release date: 9 June 2000
- Country: India
- Language: Hindi
- Budget: ₹16 crore
- Box office: ₹35.06 crore

Josh (transl. Zeal; Hindi pronunciation: [dʒoːʃ]) is a 2000 Indian Hindi-language romantic musical directed by Mansoor Khan and produced by Venus Films. The film stars Shah Rukh Khan, Aishwarya Rai, Chandrachur Singh, Sharad Kapoor, and Priya Gill. The film, primarily in Hindi with occasional Konkani, was set and filmed in Goa. With some plot points inspired by the 1961 musical West Side Story, the film is set in the year 1980, amidst the backdrop of real estate deals and communal violence in Goa.

Josh was released on 9 June 2000, and emerged as a moderate success at the box-office, grossing ₹35.06 crore (US$3.7 million) worldwide. It received mixed reviews from critics with praise for its music, cinematography, action sequences and cast performances, but criticism for its script. At the 46th Filmfare Awards, Josh received five nominations, including Best Film and Best Director.

== Plot ==
Two rival street gangs—Eagles, made up of local residents, and Bichhoos (Scorpions), consisting of immigrants—operate in the town of Vasco, Goa. The Bichhoos are led by Prakash Sharma, while the Eagles are led by Max Dias. Prakash, a delinquent, uses his gang for underhanded activities in the Vasco real estate market. Max and his twin sister Shirley are orphans and members of a local motorcycle crew alongside the Eagles. The gangs are sworn enemies and have divided the town into territories to prevent clashes, with Fr. Jacob or the town Inspector usually intervening when they fight.

Rahul, Prakash's brother, is a well-educated masterchef working in Mumbai. After two years away, he returns to Vasco intending to take his family back to Mumbai. However, while touring the town, he rediscovers his affection for it. In Eagles territory, he meets Shirley and falls in love with her, deciding to remain in Vasco and open a pastry shop. His involvement with Shirley draws him into the gangs' rivalry. Max and the Eagles disapprove of Rahul's presence and destroy his shop, leaving him heavily indebted to his landlord.

Desperate for money, Prakash plans to take control of the village ground, which historically belonged to Alberto Vasco, the landlord of the village and the man after whom the town is named. Rahul discovers that Alberto passed the ground to a woman named Mary Anne Louise. Investigating the address listed for Mr. Vasco, he learns that Mary had rented Rose villa at 13, Churchill Road, from Lady D'Costa twenty-two years earlier. Mrs. D'Costa reveals that Mary was Max and Shirley's mother, and that the twins are Alberto Vasco's illegitimate children, born in 1958.

Rahul intends to reveal their parentage to Shirley in a letter, but Prakash intercepts it. Realising that the twins' inheritance could be worth ₹20 lakhs, Prakash plots to have Rahul marry Shirley and to kill Max so that he can obtain the land. When Prakash attempts to kill Max, a fight ensues and Max accidentally shoots him while defending himself. Max is arrested, and the trial creates a rift between Shirley and Rahul, as Rahul initially believes Prakash had approached Max to ask for Shirley's hand in marriage and that Max killed him without justification.

Before Max is sentenced, Rahul discovers the truth and defends him in court. He produces documents proving that the disputed land is Max and Shirley's inheritance: Alberto Vasco, having distanced himself from his children, had placed it in their mother's name. The judge therefore rules that Max acted in self-defense and acquits him. Max apologises to Rahul and asks for his blessing to marry Shirley, ultimately reconciling the two gangs and uniting the Eagles and Bichhoos.

== Cast ==
- Shah Rukh Khan as Max Dias, Shirley's twin brother
- Chandrachur Singh as Rahul Sharma
- Sharad Kapoor as Prakash Sharma, Rahul's brother.
- Aishwarya Rai as Shirley Dias, Max's twin sister.
- Priya Gill as Rosanne, Max's love interest (special appearance)
- Sharat Saxena as Police Inspector
- Vivek Vaswani as Savio
- Aanjjan Srivastav as Mr. Mascarenhas
- Suhas Joshi as Rahul's mother
- Nadira as Mrs. Louise
- Ali Asgar as Deven
- Sushant Singh as Gotiya
- Puneet Vashisht as Ronnie
- Raymond Albuquerque as Alberto Vasco
- Shraddha Nigam as Prakash's girlfriend
- Rajesh Khera as Matwyn
- Manav Gohil as Ganpat

== Production ==
Director Mansoor Khan made a comeback to filmmaking with Josh after a hiatus of five years. He had initially approached Salman Khan for the role of Max Dias, but Khan declined the film as at the time he was dating Rai and was uncomfortable playing her brother and Shah Rukh Khan then signed on. Mansoor was keen on bringing Shah Rukh Khan and Aamir Khan together for Josh, approaching him for the role of Rahul Sharma, but the latter rejected the film as he found the role given to him too small. The role was eventually played by Chandrachur Singh.

To enhance his on-screen resemblance to Aishwarya Rai Bachchan, Shah Rukh Khan donned blue contact lens for the film. The production journey of "Josh" spanned four years, involving a meticulous creative process.

== Music ==
Josh

Soundtrack album by Anu Malik
- Released: 15 April 2000
- Recorded: 1998–1999
- Genre: Feature film soundtrack
- Label: Venus Records & Tapes
- Producer: Anu Malik

A. R. Rahman was signed as the music composer at first, but opted out due to scheduling conflicts with other films. After Rahman opted out, Mansoor Khan roped in Anu Malik to complete the music quickly and release the film on time. The song "Hai Mera Dil" is based on "Sealed with a Kiss" written by Peter Udell and Gary Geld, and "Djobi Djoba" performed by Gipsy Kings. In a notable debut, Shah Rukh Khan showcased his vocal talent by singing the song "Apun Bola". According to Box Office India, with around 18,00,000 units sold, this film's soundtrack was the year's ninth highest-selling album.

#	Title	Singer(s)	Length	Lyricist(s)
1	"Apun Bola"	Hema Sardesai and Shahrukh Khan	04:25	Nitin Raikwar
2	"Hai Mera Dil"	Udit Narayan and Alka Yagnik	04:08	Sameer Anjaan
3	"Hum To Dil Se Haare"	Udit Narayan and Alka Yagnik	05:06	Sameer Anjaan
4	"Mere Khayalon Ki Malika"	Abhijeet Bhattacharya	04:50	Sameer Anjaan
5	"Zinda Hain Hum To"	Abhijeet Bhattacharya, Jolly Mukherjee and Hema Sardesai	04:44	Nitin Raikwar
6	"Sailaru Sailare"	Mano and Suresh Peters	05:25	Sameer Anjaan
7	"Hai Mera Dil" (Instrumental)		04:08	
8	"Hum To Dil Se Haare" (Instrumental)		05:07	

== Reception ==
=== Box office ===
Josh grossed ₹30.05 crore (US$3.2 million) in India and $1.127 million (₹5.01 crore) in other countries, for a worldwide total of ₹35.06 crore (US$3.7 million), against its ₹16 crore (US$1.7 million) budget. It had a worldwide opening weekend of ₹8.82 crore (US$940,000), and grossed ₹15.81 crore (US$1.7 million) in its first week.

In India, the film opened on Friday, 9 June 2000, across 300 screens, and earned ₹1.25 crore (US$130,000) nett on its opening day. It grossed ₹3.71 crore (US$400,000) nett in its opening weekend, and had a first week of ₹7.25 crore (US$770,000) nett. The film earned a total of ₹17.83 crore (US$1.9 million) nett, and was declared "Average" by Box Office India. It is the 5th-highest-grossing film of 2000 in India.

Among overseas territories, Josh had an opening weekend of $575,000 (₹2.55 crore) and went on to gross $800,000 (₹3.56 crore) in its first week. The film earned a total of $1.127 million (₹5.01 crore) at the end of its theatrical run. Overseas, It is the 9th-highest-grossing film of 2000.

Collections Breakdown
Territory	Territory Wise Collections Break-up
India	Nett Gross: ₹17.83 crore (US$1.9 million)
India	Distributor Share: ₹9.98 crore (US$1.1 million)
India	Total Gross: ₹30.05 crore (US$3.2 million)
International (Outside India)	$1.127 million (₹5.01 crore)
Worldwide	₹35.06 crore (US$3.7 million)

=== Critical reception ===
The film received mixed reviews from critics. Taran Adarsh from Bollywood Hungama noted "On the whole, Josh is a well-made film with great performances and a hit musical score. But the Goan ambience will restrict its prospects in some states due to lack of identification. Also an average second half and a weak climax are major limitations".

== Awards ==
46th Filmfare Awards:

Nominated

- Best Film – Ratan Jain
- Best Director – Mansoor Khan
- Best Villain – Sharad Kapoor
- Best Music Director – Anu Malik
- Best Female Playback Singer – Alka Yagnik for "Hai Mera Dil"

2nd IIFA Awards:

Won

- Best Art Direction – Nitin Chandrakant Desai

Nominated

- Best Director – Mansoor Khan
- Best Supporting Actor – Chandrachur Singh
- Best Villain – Sharad Kapoor
- Best Music Director – Anu Malik
- Best Story – Mansoor Khan
