= Jatin–Lalit =

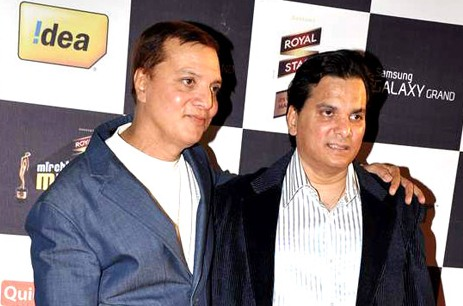
- Jatin Pandit & Lalit Pandit

Background information
- Also known as: Jatin–Lalit
- Born: Jatin Pandit; Lalit Pandit
- Origin: Mumbai, Maharashtra, India
- Occupations: Composer, music director
- Years active: 1991–2006 (they have been working independently since 2006)

Jatin–Lalit is an Indian music director duo consisting of brothers Jatin Pandit and Lalit Pandit. They are widely known for their contributions to Hindi cinema during the 1990s and early 2000s. The duo is known for their melodious compositions and has been associated with several hit films. Some of their most famous works include Dilwale Dulhania Le Jayenge, Kuch Kuch Hota Hai, Mohabbatein, Kabhi Khushi Kabhie Gham, and Pyaar To Hona Hi Tha.

Jatin–Lalit is their professional name and appears on the covers of their music albums, CDs and DVDs.

== Early life ==
Jatin and Lalit come from a musical family originating from Pili Mandori village in Hissar district of Haryana state. Classical vocalist Pandit Jasraj was their uncle. They received their musical education primarily from their father, Pandit Pratap Narayan. They were taught guitar and piano by Pyarelal Ramprasad Sharma, of the Laxmikant–Pyarelal duo.

Hindi film actresses Sulakshana Pandit and Vijayta Pandit are their sisters, and late music director Aadesh Shrivastava was their brother-in-law, being married to the younger of the sisters, Vijayta.

== Musical career ==
The creation of the pair Jatin–Lalit was by accident. In the early 80s, Jatin teamed up with Mandheer (elder brother) to team up as Jatin-Mandheer. This pair never had any big hits to their name. However, they earned the badge of working with legends - Kishore Kumar-Wafaa (1990) and Mohd Rafi - Dil Hi Dil Main (1982). Lalit, the youngest brother, was discovering his love for music. Since, the Jatin-Mandheer pair didn't really sizzle in the circuit, and Lalit was eager to make a mark as well, it was decided to revisit the music combination, and thus Jatin -Lalit - the duo, was formed. Their first foray as a pair was a private album Rhythmic Love. This album had quite a few songs, which were later recreated by the pair, in successful films like Yaara Dildaara, Yes Boss.

They began their career in 1991, composing music for the Hindi movie Yaara Dildara. Although the film was a Romantic Film, its music was the biggest hit. The evergreen famous song of the movie was "Bin Tere Sanam", which topped the charts. They were first noticed for their work on the soundtrack of the movie Khiladi and for "Pehla Nasha", a romantic song from Jo Jeeta Wohi Sikander, the film that earned them their first nomination for the Filmfare Award for Best Music Director. Their other film score of 1992, Raju Ban Gaya Gentleman was also very successful. Their compositions are strongly influenced by R. D. Burman's style of music-making. In 1994, they composed the successful soundtrack to the Shahrukh Khan-starrer Kabhi Haan Kabhi Naa. Jatin–Lalit's score for the cult classic Dilwale Dulhania Le Jayenge was a massive success, and is remembered as one of the all-time best Bollywood soundtracks, earning them their second nomination at the Filmfare Awards. It is the 5th highest selling Bollywood soundtrack of all time. Following this, their successful scores for Khamoshi: The Musical (1996) and Yes Boss (1997), which earned them their third and fourth nominations at the Filmfare Awards, thus cementing their place as Bollywood's top music directors.

Jatin–Lalit's next big success came with Karan Johar's debut directorial, Kuch Kuch Hota Hai, which sold 8.5 million copies and earned them their fifth nomination for Best Music Director at the Filmfare Awards. Pyaar To Hona Hi Tha, in the same year, and Sarfarosh, in 1999 were also appreciated, earning them their sixth and seventh nominations at the Filmfare Awards. Mohabbatein, (2000) directed by Aditya Chopra won acclaim, and the song "Humko Humise Chura Lo" became a classic. This soundtrack earned them their eighth nomination at the Filmfare Awards, as was Kabhi Khushi Kabhie Gham (2001), another famous soundtrack that included songs such as "Bole Chudiyaan", which earned them their ninth Filmfare Award nomintation. Before their split in 2006, some of their successful soundtracks include Chalte Chalte (2003), Hum Tum (2004) and Fanaa (2006), their final collaboration. The three movies won them their tenth, eleventh and twelfth nominations at the Filmfare Awards. Despite being nominated 12 times, Jatin–Lalit never won a Filmfare Award, and hold the record for the most nominations without ever winning.

They have composed a total of 473 songs in 72 films. The duo has worked with a variety of lyricists; Majrooh Sultanpuri, Gopaldas Neeraj, Anand Bakshi, Sameer, Javed Akhtar and singers including Amit Kumar, Kumar Sanu, Abhijeet Bhattacharya, Udit Narayan, Hariharan, Sonu Nigam, K.S. Chithra, Anuradha Paudwal, Alka Yagnik, Kavita Krishnamurthy, Sadhana Sargam, Shaan, Babul Supriyo and many others. Veteran singers Lata Mangeshkar, Asha Bhosle, Mohammed Aziz and Jagjit Singh have also sung in a few movies for the duo.

During the last few years of their joint career, their music albums contained several songs composed by other musicians. This practice was not liked by Jatin–Lalit; however, the producer and director insisted on it. In Karan Johar's Kabhi Khushi Kabhie Gham, two of the tracks were composed by Sandesh Shandilya. In Chalte Chalte, Aadesh Shrivastava composed several songs, while in Pyaar Kiya To Darna Kya, one song was composed by Himesh Reshammiya and Sajid–Wajid.

They were among the first composers to write songs performed by Bollywood film stars rather than playback singers. They specially composed "Aati Kya Khandala" in the film Ghulam for the lead actor Aamir Khan. Later, they also composed a song for Sanjay Dutt to sing in the film Khoobsurat.

Jatin–Lalit has composed the highest-selling Bollywood soundtrack of the year on four occasions – Dilwale Dulhania Le Jayenge in 1995, Kuch Kuch Hota Hai in 1998, Mohabbatein in 2000, and Kabhi Khushi Kabhie Gham in 2001.

The duo has been accused of plagiarism. Indian music critic Karthik Srinivasan, on his website ItwoFS, which tracks plagiarism in the Indian film music industry, lists 23 such tunes. Among those is Suno Zara from the movie Bada Din (1998) allegedly taken from Anne Murray’s You Needed Me (1978).

=== The separation and reunion ===
After working for almost 16 years together, they announced that they would be parting ways due to personal problems. Reasons for the separation still are unknown.

In February 2020, the Jatin–Lalit duo came together and organised a concert in Mumbai which was very well received and in which numerous leading Bollywood singers performed.

=== Solo careers ===
Lalit and Jatin have continued to compose separately.

Lalit scored the 2007 film, Life Mein Kabhie Kabhiee, Showbiz, Horn Ok Pleassss and Dulha Mil Gaya.

Jatin composed the score for Saurav Shukla's film, I Am 24, starring Neha Dhupia and Rajat Kapoor. It is a Planman Motion Films Presentation.

He composed for Raja Sen's film Krishnakanter Will. "I am working on the number. I am trying to make it in such a way that it goes along with the novel written by Bankimchandra Chattopadhyay. The song will be melody-based," says Jatin. He recorded an album for the president of the Indian Business and Professional Council, Abbas Ali Mirza. He is doing the Music for Kundan Shah's next. Considering the strong track record Jatin–Lalit had with Kundan Shah, this film could be the next Kabhi Haa Kabhi Naa for Jatin. Jatin is working on the maiden venture of Gazebo Entertainment's "Saturday Night".

Lalit composed the song "Munni Badnaam Hui" for Dabangg (2010). The song has become hugely popular among the masses. He won the Filmfare Award for Best Music Director with Sajid–Wajid in 2011 for the soundtrack of the film, particularly for its quirky lyrics and dancing choreography.

=== Collaboration with singers ===
Jatin–Lalit is most remembered for their collaboration with Alka Yagnik. They composed 136 songs for her and this team has become one of the most sought-after singer-composer duos in music history alongside Asha Bhosle–R. D. Burman, Asha Bhosle–O. P. Nayyar, Asha Bhosle–Bappi Lahiri, Lata Mangeshkar–Laxmikant-Pyarelal, Lata Mangeshkar–R. D. Burman, Lata Mangeshkar–Shankar–Jaikishan, Lata Mangeshkar–Madan Mohan, Lata Mangeshkar–S. D. Burman, Lata Mangeshkar–Salil Chowdhury, Lata Mangeshkar–Khayyam etc. Among males, Jatin–Lalit's most favourite were Kumar Sanu and Udit Narayan. They equally propelled their career with hit after hit, with both singers singing over 100 songs each for them.

Singer	Number of songs
Alka Yagnik	136
Kumar Sanu	109
Udit Narayan	102
Kavita Krishnamurthy	61
Abhijeet Bhattacharya	55
Sonu Nigam	30
Anuradha Paudwal	19
Shaan	15
Sunidhi Chauhan	15
Sadhana Sargam	13

== Non-music work ==
=== Acting career ===
Jatin and Lalit appeared in the 1992 hit film Jo Jeeta Wohi Sikandar during the song "Humse Hai Saara Jahaan". Jatin is singing the song along with Sadhna Sargam, while Lalit is playing the bass guitar (the first shot of the song). Jatin performed the song "Roothke Humse" in the film.

=== Television career ===
Jatin–Lalit were appointed as judges in the Zee Television musical show Sa Re Ga Ma Pa. They were judges on another musical show, Star Voice of India. Jatin has appeared as a mentor in TV show Jhoom India. He was judge and mentor in the reality show on Sony TV's Waar Parriwar.

== Awards and recognition ==
Filmfare Awards:

- Nominated – Best Music Director (1993) – Jo Jeeta Wohi Sikandar
- Nominated – Best Music Director (1996) – Dilwale Dulhania Le Jayenge
- Nominated – Best Music Director (1997) – Khamoshi: The Musical
- Nominated – Best Music Director (1998) – Yes Boss
- Nominated – Best Music Director (1999) – Pyaar To Hona Hi Tha
- Nominated – Best Music Director (1999) – Kuch Kuch Hota Hai
- Nominated – Best Music Director (2000) – Sarfarosh
- Nominated – Best Music Director (2001) – Mohabbatein
- Nominated – Best Music Director (2002) – Kabhi Khushi Kabhie Gham
- Nominated – Best Music Director (2004) – Chalte Chalte
- Nominated – Best Music Director (2005) – Hum Tum
- Nominated – Best Music Director (2007) – Fanaa

Their soundtrack of Dilwale Dulhaniya Le Jayenge was ajudged as the top Hindi soundtrack of all time by on-line voters on the BBC Asian Network. The second and third positions also went to Jatin–Lalit for their compositions from Kabhi Khushi Kabhie Gham and Kuch Kuch Hota Hai respectively.

Dilwale Dulhania Le Jayenge has also been rated the 6th best soundtrack ever by Planet Bollywood on their "100 Greatest Bollywood Soundtracks". Other soundtracks included in the list are Kabhi Khushi Kabhie Gham (64), Kuch Kuch Hota Hai (69) and Khamoshi: The Musical (97).

== Discography ==
Year	Film	Notes
1991	Yaara Dildara	
1992	Jo Jeeta Wohi Sikander	Nominated – Filmfare Award for Best Music Director
1992	Khiladi	
1992	Raju Ban Gaya Gentleman	
1993	Bhookamp	
1993	Aadmi	
1993	Boy Friend	
1993	Vishnu Vijaya	Bilingual film; shot in Hindi as Ashaant
1994	Hanste Khelte	Television film
1994	Laqshya	
1994	Kabhi Haan Kabhi Naa	
1994	Cheetah	
1994	Vaade Iraade	
1995	Nishana	
1995	Paandav	
1995	Gangster	
1995	Dilwale Dulhania Le Jayenge	Nominated – Filmfare Award for Best Music Director
1996	Biyer Phool	Bengali film
1996	Fareb	
1996	Khamoshi: The Musical	Nominated – Filmfare Award for Best Music Director
1996	Return of Jewel Thief	
1997	Gundagardi	
1997	Yes Boss	Nominated – Filmfare Award for Best Music Director
1997	Daava	
1997	Ek Phool Teen Kante	
1998	Bada Din	
1998	Saazish	
1998	Pyaar Kiya To Darna Kya	
1998	Jab Pyaar Kisise Hota Hai	
1998	Ghulam	
1998	Pyar To Hona Hi Tha	Nominated – Filmfare Award for Best Music Director
1998	Dhoondte Reh Jaaoge!	
1998	Kuch Kuch Hota Hai	Nominated – Filmfare Award for Best Music Director; Winner – Bollywood Movie Award for Best Music Director; Winner – Screen Award for Best Music Director; Winner – Zee Cine Award for Best Music Director
1999	Silsila Hai Pyar Ka	
1999	Sarfarosh	Nominated – Filmfare Award for Best Music Director
1999	Pyaar Koi Khel Nahin	
1999	Sangharsh	
1999	Dil Kya Kare	
1999	Sar Ankhon Par	
1999	Vaastav: The Reality	
1999	Dillagi	
1999	Khoobsurat	
1999	Yeh Hai Mumbai Meri Jaan	Soundtrack released under the title Mr. Aashiq
2000	Phir Bhi Dil Hai Hindustani	
2000	Dhai Akshar Prem Ke	
2000	Mohabbatein	Nominated – Filmfare Award for Best Music Director
2000	Raja Ko Rani Se Pyar Ho Gaya	
2000	Raju Chacha	
2001	Censor	
2001	Albela	
2001	Kabhi Khushi Kabhie Gham	Nominated – Filmfare Award for Best Music Director
2002	Kranti	
2002	Aankhen	
2002	Tum Jiyo Hazaron Saal	
2002	Soch	
2002	Waah! Tera Kya Kehna	
2002	Kehtaa Hai Dil Baar Baar	
2003	Haasil	
2003	Chalte Chalte	Nominated – Filmfare Award for Best Music Director
2004	Hum Tum	Nominated – Filmfare Award for Best Music Director
2004	Rok Sako To Rok Lo	
2005	Zameer	
2005	Chand Sa Roshan Chehra	
2005	Khamoshh... Khauff Ki Raat	
2005	Sab Kuch Hai Kuch Bhi Nahin	
2005	Revati	
2005	Film Star	
2005	Pyaar Mein Twist	
2006	Fanaa	Nominated – Filmfare Award for Best Music Director
2006	Mera Dil Leke Dekkho	

=== Filmography of Lalit Pandit ===
Year	Film	Notes
2007	Life Mein Kabhie Kabhiee	
2007	Showbiz	
2008	Mr. White Mr. Black	
2008	Rafoo Chakkar: Fun on the Run	
2009	Red Alert: The War Within	
2009	Horn 'Ok' Pleassss	
2009	Mere Khwabon Mein Jo Aaye	
2010	Dabangg	Composed the song: "Munni Badnaam Hui" Filmfare Award for Best Music Director along with Sajid–Wajid
2010	Dulha Mil Gaya	
2010	Na Ghar Ke Na Ghaat Ke	
2011	Force	Composed the song: "Dum Hai Toh Aaja"
2012	Chaalis Chauraasi	
2012	Rangdari	
2013	Besharam	
2014	Spark	Composed the song: "Kuch Lab Pe Hai"
2015	Ishq Ne Krazy Kiya Re	
2016	Shorgul	Composed 3 songs
2017	Taawdo The Sunlight	
2017	Patel Ki Punjabi Shaadi	
2017	Call for Fun	
2018	Hamara Tiranga	
2022	Love You Loktantra	
2025	Mannu Kya Karegga	

=== Non-film songs ===
Year	Album	Song	Composer	Singer
1986	Rhythmic Love	"Dil Kehta Hai"	Jatin-Lalit	Lalit Pandit
1986	Rhythmic Love	"Tum Ko Jo Dekha"	Jatin-Lalit	Lalit Pandit
1986	Rhythmic Love	"Leja Mera Dil"	Jatin-Lalit	Lalit Pandit
1986	Rhythmic Love	"Yehi Hai Meri Zindegi"	Jatin-Lalit	Lalit Pandit
1986	Rhythmic Love	"Baat Hai Yeh Mere Dil Ki"	Jatin-Lalit	Vijeta Pandit
1986	Rhythmic Love	"Meri Jawani Ye Umar"	Jatin-Lalit	Vijeta Pandit
1986	Rhythmic Love	"O Hasina"	Jatin-Lalit	Sulakshana Pandit, Harjit
1986	Rhythmic Love	"Ghanti Baji To Aisa Laga Ki Tum Aaye"	Jatin-Lalit	Sulakshana Pandit
2016	Tujhko Bulate Hain	"Tujhko Bulate Hain"	Lalit Pandit	Sanjeev Yadav
2016	Kaho Itna Pyar Karogi Na	"Kaho Itna Pyar Karogi Na"	Lalit Pandit	Sanjeev Yadav
2019	FLAMES-Season 2	"Kuch Toh Dil"	Lalit Pandit	Lalit Pandit
2019	FLAMES-Season 2	"Thame Dil Ko"	Lalit Pandit	Abhijeet Bhattacharya
2019	FLAMES-Season 2	"Khamoshiyan"	Lalit Pandit	Kumar Sanu, Alka Yagnik

== Sales ==
All-time music sales:

Film	Year	Units Sold	Annual rank
Dilwale Dulhania Le Jayenge	1995	20,000,000	1
Kuch Kuch Hota Hai	1998	8,300,000	1
Mohabbatein	2000	5,000,000	1
Kabhi Khushi Kabhie Gham	2001	3,500,000	1
Pyaar Kiya To Darna Kya	1997	3,500,000	5
Pyaar To Hona Hi Tha	1998	3,200,000	3
Yes Boss	1997	3,000,000	7
Ghulam	1998	2,500,000	4
Khiladi	1992	2,500,000	4
Jo Jeeta Wohi Sikander	1992	2,500,000	3
Jab Pyaar Kisise Hota Hai	1998	2,000,000	9
Raju Ban Gaya Gentleman	1992	1,800,000	11
Chalte Chalte	2003	1,800,000	6
Fanaa	2006	1,700,000	3
Hum Tum	2004	1,600,000	8
