= Dilwale (1994 film) =

1994 Indian film by Harry Baweja

- Promotional poster
- Directed by: Harry Baweja
- Written by: Karan Razdan
- Produced by: Paramjeet Baweja
- Starring: Ajay Devgn; Sunil Shetty; Raveena Tandon; Paresh Rawal
- Cinematography: Damodar Naidu
- Edited by: Kuldip K. Mehan
- Music by: Nadeem-Shravan
- Production company: S. P. Creations
- Release date: 4 February 1994
- Running time: 165 minutes
- Country: India
- Language: Hindi
- Budget: ₹20.1 million
- Box office: ₹131 million

Dilwale (transl. Big-Hearted) is a 1994 Indian Hindi-language romantic action film directed by Harry Baweja. It stars Ajay Devgn, Sunil Shetty, Raveena Tandon, and Paresh Rawal as the main antagonist. Originally Divya Bharti signed for the lead, but due to her sudden demise, Tandon was cast.

Released on 4 February 1994, the film took an excellent opening and emerged as a superhit as well as one of the top-grossing films of the year. At the 40th Filmfare Awards, Shetty received a nomination in the Best Supporting Actor category.

== Plot ==
Arun Saxena is detained in a mental hospital. He attempts to escape but is stopped by the doctors. Arun's mother, Jamuna, sits in front of a temple every day with her back turned to God, vowing to only face God when Arun returns.

Inspector Vikram Singh, a young and honest police officer, is asked to visit Arun along with his superior to assess Arun's condition. Arun becomes aggressive when Sapna is mentioned. The doctors administer a shock treatment to make Arun unconscious. Vikram is moved by Arun's behaviour and believes that Arun is not insane, but deeply in love. Arun's mother visits him and pleads for him to wake up, as he needs to seek revenge against Mama Thakur. Vikram overhears this and becomes curious. Later, Vikram meets Jamuna at the temple to learn Arun's story, and the film delves into the past.

Arun used to be a happy and carefree young poet. At a party, he falls in love with Sapna. Her uncle, Rangeen "Mama" Thakur, has been hiding his true motives, as he aims to seize her wealth. Arun openly expresses his love for Sapna and even confronts Shankar Bihari, a goon hired by Mama to marry Sapna for her wealth. Arun's actions show his deep affection for Sapna. Sapna initially rejects Arun’s advances but eventually falls for him after witnessing his willingness to sacrifice his life for her. Shankar sends Jyoti to seduce Arun, which Sapna misunderstands. Arun and Sapna reconcile, but Mama attempts to harm Arun and sends goons to kill him.

Arun and Jamuna are attacked, prompting Arun to fight back and defeat the goons. He then pursues Sapna. Mama tricks Jyoti into going to Arun's house under false pretences and murders her. Arun is framed for the murder due to his association with Jyoti. Mama brutally tortures Jamuna to force Arun to confess. Arun eventually confesses, leading Sapna to believe that he is guilty and she breaks up with him. Unable to bear this news, Arun loses his sanity and is subsequently admitted to a mental asylum after being found guilty.

Vikram makes a promise to Jamuna that he will fight for justice for Arun. Natwar reveals that he has secretly taken pictures of the murder and is blackmailing Mama. He arranges for Natwar to be killed by hitmen. Arun witnesses this while trying to escape from the mental asylum van, but he is captured by the doctors before the hitmen can reach him. Arun draws the murder on his cell wall. Vikram overhears Natwar's wife mentioning that Natwar worked for Mama Thakur. The hitmen try to kill Arun by bribing a guard at the mental asylum, but Arun survives and is captured by the doctors. The hitmen escape. Vikram arrives to see the drawing in Arun's cell. To protect Arun, Vikram offers him accommodation at his home as his life is in danger. Vikram finds a photo of Sapna in Arun's suitcase. It is revealed that Vikram also fell in love with Sapna, but he keeps this information from Arun.

Vikram tracks down Sapna and asks her to meet Arun, but under the condition that Arun doesn't see her. Sapna agrees. Vikram then tells Sapna the truth about Mama's crimes and Ram Singh tells Sapna the truth about Arun’s situation After Vikram confronts Mama Thakur and tells him his days are over. Arun almost gets killed by the men who killed Natwar at a bar.

However, he receives an electric shock that brings back his memories and restores his sanity. The police arrive to arrest Arun, but with Vikram's help, he escapes to reunite with Sapna. Arun embarks on a brutal vengeance mission, burning all of Mama Thakur's businesses. The commissioner is unable to persuade Arun to surrender, which angers him. Arun captures Mama Thakur from a police protection van, and Vikram and Sapna arrive at the scene after Vikram rescues her from Shankar Bihari. All the goons are killed, and Arun's revenge is complete with Mama Thakur dead and Sapna back with him. The film ends with Arun and Sapna together, with Vikram driving them as his face expresses sadness that he too once loved Sapna and joy that Arun is united with her.

== Cast ==
- Ajay Devgn as Arun Saxena
- Raveena Tandon as Sapna Puri, Arun's love interest.
- Suniel Shetty as Inspector Vikram Singh
- Paresh Rawal as Mama Thakur
- Reema Lagoo as Jamuna Saxena
- Saeed Jaffrey as Police Commissioner Suryadhar Jaisingh
- Gulshan Grover as Shankar Bihari
- Pramod Moutho as Yashpal Thakur
- Himani Shivpuri as Vandita Thakur
- Navneet Nishan as Jyoti Bhatia
- Tej Sapru as Inspector Rudranil Venkatraman
- Javed Khan Amrohi as Constable Ram Singh
- Avtaar Gill as Natwarlal Yadav
- Ajit Vachani as Public Prosecutor Jagmohan Sinha
- Vikas Anand as Judge Anupam Sharma
- Rami Reddy as Banshul Singh
- Achyut Potdar as Dr. Abhijeet Sonkar
- Anang Desai as Dr. Rakvansh Deshpande
- Virendra Saxena as Ward boy
- Subbiraj as Former-Army Major Vidvaan Singh
- Anil Dhawan as Vedaksh Singh
- Sarala Yeolekar as Shraddha Singh
- A. K. Hangal as Mental Hospital Patient
- Anjan Srivastav as Mental Hospital Patient
- Rajesh Puri as Mental Hospital Patient
- Dinesh Kaushik as Mental Hospital Patient
- Sameer Khakhar as Ward Boy

== Soundtrack ==
Dilwale

Soundtrack album by Nadeem-Shravan
- Released: July 1993
- Recorded: 1993
- Venue: Mumbai
- Studio: Sunny Super Sound
- Genre: Feature film soundtrack
- Length: 41:29
- Language: Hindi
- Label: Venus Records & Tapes
- Producer: Nadeem-Shravan

Nadeem-Shravan chronology
| Tadipaar (1993) | Dilwale (1993) | Salaami (1994) |

The music was composed by Nadeem-Shravan and the lyrics were penned by Sameer. Two of the songs, "Kitna Haseen Chehra" and "Jeeta Tha Jiske Liye" dominated the musical charts and were highly popular among the masses. According to Box Office India, with around 55,00,000 units sold, this film's soundtrack was the best-selling Hindi film album of 1993.

Track list

| # | Title | Singer(s) | Raga |
|---|---|---|---|
| 1 | "Kitna Haseen Chehra" | Kumar Sanu | |
| 2 | "Jeeta Tha Jiske Liye" | Kumar Sanu, Alka Yagnik | Shivaranjani |
| 3 | "Mauka Milega To Hum" | Udit Narayan, Alka Yagnik | |
| 4 | "Jeeta Hoon Jiske Liye" | Kumar Sanu, Alka Yagnik | |
| 5 | "Jo Tumhe Chahe Usko" | Kumar Sanu | |
| 6 | "Saaton Janam Main Tere" | Kumar Sanu, Alka Yagnik | |
| 7 | "Ek Aisi Ladki Thi" | Kumar Sanu | |

== Awards and nominations ==
40th Filmfare Awards

- Nominated - Best Supporting Actor - Sunil Shetty
