= Aagaah: The Warning =

- Theatrical poster
- Directed by: Karan Razdan
- Written by: Karan Razdan
- Produced by: Ram Kudale
- Starring: Atul Kulkarni; Rituparna Sengupta; Anupam Kher; Karan Razdan
- Cinematography: C. Rajendra Prasad
- Edited by: Sanjay Verma
- Music by: Sachin Gupta
- Release date: 5 August 2011
- Running time: 90 minutes
- Country: India
- Language: Hindi

Aagaah: The Warning is a 2011 Indian Hindi-language horror drama film directed by Karan Razdan and produced by Ram Kudale. The film released on 5 August 2011.

== Plot ==
The movie starts with the scenario of a terrorist training camp where the group leader Aaazan Khan preparing his team for a mission of terrorist attack in Mumbai. The group took over a boat to encroach Mumbai from the seas as like 26/11 attack. They killed Boatman Ramsharan and his fellow fishermen in this course. On reaching the shores, Azaan is shot down by police but attack continues as planned by them.

In a far away seaside village, Ramsharan's family is shocked on hearing about his death. His parents and wife Megha tries to console their only child Muskan. Muskan eagerly wait for her father because she does not understand the concept of death. Muskaan is always in search for her father. During her search she gets possessed by a spirit who tries to converse with the family. Local villagers informs the police about the ghost attack on the family and a corrupt police officer arrests Megha. While police officer tries to molest her the spirit reappears and beat him. Pir Baba come to help Muskan and the family but the spirit is still is there. On the other hand, a rich businessman Nawab saab involves with the terrorist who planned to attack the village. Spirit informs Ramsharan's family regarding the future attack. While para military forces come there and estopped them the spirit appears again and disclose that he is the ghost of deceased Aazan Khan who realised after death that jihad or revolution is not killing innocent people but to follow the path of peace as prescribed by the Quran.

== Cast ==
- Karan Razdan as Ramsharan
- Atul Kulkarni as Aazan Khan
- Rituparna Sengupta as Megha
- Anupam Kher as Pir Baba
- Ila Arun as Ramsharan's mother
- Satish Kaushik as Ramsharan's father
- Zakir Hussain as Nawab Saab

== Reception ==
Komal Nahta of Koimoi awarded the film a mere 0.5/5, calling it "a disaster." He criticized the story as "weird and silly," the screenplay as "childish," and the dialogues particularly the Gujarati as poorly written and awkward.

News18 noted that "hardly anything" works in the film, citing an incoherent plot, flawed narrative, and poor execution across writing, performances, and technical aspects.
