= Hawas =

Hawas may refer to:

- Hawas (1974 film), an Indian Hindi-language drama film
- Hawas (2004 film), an Indian Hindi erotic thriller
