= Dil Hai Tumhaara =

2002 Indian film by Kundan Shah

- Directed by: Kundan Shah
- Written by: Subrat Sinha (dialogues)
- Screenplay by: Rajkumar Santoshi; Kundan Shah
- Produced by: Kumar S. Taurani; Ramesh S. Taurani
- Starring: Rekha; Preity Zinta; Mahima Chaudhry; Arjun Rampal; Jimmy Sheirgill; Alok Nath
- Cinematography: Jehangir Choudhary
- Edited by: Aseem Sinha
- Music by: Songs: Nadeem-Shravan; Background score: Surinder Sodhi
- Production company: Tips Industries
- Release date: 6 September 2002
- Running time: 185 minutes
- Language: Hindi
- Budget: ₹7.25 crore
- Box office: ₹18.03 crore

Dil Hai Tumhaara (transl. My Heart Is Yours) is a 2002 Indian Hindi-language romantic drama film directed by Kundan Shah. The film stars Preity Zinta in the central part of Shalu, a young woman who, unbeknownst to her, was born out of wedlock and, following her parents' death, was begrudgingly adopted by her father's wife (Rekha), who has never accepted her as her own and whose love Shalu has been craving since childhood. Mahima Chaudhry, Arjun Rampal, Jimmy Sheirgill and Alok Nath play supporting roles. The film was promoted as a star vehicle for Zinta and, although a moderate success on release, Zinta's performance was praised by critics and earned her nominations for Best Actress at a number of award ceremonies. The soundtrack, composed by Nadeem-Shravan, did well on the charts. It has also been uploaded on YouTube channel Shemaroo.

== Plot ==
Shalu is a fun-loving young woman living with her mother, Sarita, and older sister, Nimmi. Unknown to Shalu and Nimmi, they are half sisters. Shalu is the daughter of Sarita's late husband Shekar and the woman with whom he had an affair. Fatally wounded in a car accident with Shalu's biological mother, Shekar begged Sarita to raise Shalu as her own.

Although Sarita adopted Shalu, she cannot give her the love she shows towards Nimmi. Shalu, on the other hand, constantly craves her mother's affection. She seeks attention and retaliates by being rebellious. Nimmi loves Shalu very much and constantly stands up for her, though she refuses to think ill of her mother or take sides.

A young man named Dev Khanna enters the sisters' lives. Dev and Shalu initially do not get along but slowly fall in love. However, circumstances make Nimmi believe that Dev is in love with her. Sarita, only aware of Nimmi's side of the story, offers a marriage proposal to Dev's father on Nimmi's behalf. Mr. Khanna initially agrees but is taken aback when he realizes that Sarita is talking about Nimmi and not Shalu. When Sarita sees Dev and Shalu being affectionate, she jumps to the conclusion that Shalu has stolen Dev from Nimmi just as Shalu's mother stole Shekar from her. In anger, she reveals her true heritage to her in front of Nimmi.

Shocked at her parentage, Shalu decides to give up Dev to make her mother and sister happy. Saddened, Dev eventually agrees to marry Nimmi to make Shalu happy. Nimmi notices that something is wrong with Shalu, but Shalu deflects the question by saying that she has fallen in love with Samir, her childhood friend who has been in love with her for years.

On the engagement day, Sarita's political rivals try to use Shalu's illegitimate heritage to threaten Nimmi's marriage to Dev, who is from a prominent family. Shalu takes matters into her own hands, rushing to Dev's house, where she publicly announces that she was born out of wedlock, arguing that it is proof of Sarita's kindness and generosity that she had adopted Shalu. Mr. Khanna is impressed with Shalu's courage and promises that nothing will stop the wedding.

Sarita secretly witnesses Shalu's confession and is deeply touched. She is ashamed of how she has treated Shalu, and they share their first hug. Sarita tells her that she will ask Nimmi to step aside if Shalu and Dev are really in love. Shalu stops her from doing so, saying that now that she has her mother's love and acceptance, she does not want anything else.

Nimmi is very happy that her mother has accepted Shalu, but she still feels that something is not quite right with her sister. She soon learns of the whole ruse from Samir and gladly steps aside for Shalu, and Shalu and Dev are united.

== Cast ==
- Rekha as Sarita
- Preity Zinta as Shalu
- Mahima Chaudhry as Nimmi
- Arjun Rampal as Dev Khanna
- Jimmy Sheirgill as Sameer
- Alok Nath as Mr. Khanna
- Sachin Khedekar as Shekhar
- Govind Namdeo as Mr. Mittal
- Aanjjan Srivastav as Roopchand
- Gajraj Rao as Khoobchand
- Vivek Shauq as Factory CEO
- Dilip Joshi as Factory CEO
- Deepak Dobriyal as Shepherd
- Achyut Potdar as Sarita's advisor
- Natasha Sinha as Renu, Shalu's biological mother

== Production ==
Dil Hai Tumhaara marked the second collaboration of Preity Zinta and Kundan Shah, the first being the sleeper hit Kya Kehna (2000). The film was promoted as a star vehicle for Zinta.

== Music ==
Dil Hai Tumhara

Studio album by Nadeem-Shravan
- Released: 28 June 2002 (India)
- Genre: Feature film soundtrack
- Length: 43:39
- Label: Tips Music Films
- Producer: Nadeem-Shravan

Nadeem-Shravan chronology
Tumse Achcha Kaun Hai (2002)	Dil Hai Tumhara (2002)	Jeena Sirf Merre Liye (2002)

Professional ratings
Review scores
Source	Rating
Planet Bollywood	8/10 stars

The soundtrack went on to be successful. It has nine songs composed by the duo Nadeem-Shravan, with lyrics authored by Sameer.

In most of the songs, vocals for Zinta, Rampal and Sheirgill are supplied by Alka Yagnik, Kumar Sanu and Udit Narayan, respectively. The album also features Kavita Krishnamurthy, Sonu Nigam, Shaan, Sarika Kapoor and Tauseef Akhtar.

According to the Indian trade website Box Office India, with around 20,00,000 units sold, this film's soundtrack album was the year's sixth highest-selling. The song "Dil Laga Liya Maine" has the same composition as of "Boohay Barian" by Hadiqa Kiani.

#	Title	Singer(s)	Length
1.	"Dil Laga Liya Maine"	Udit Narayan, Alka Yagnik	04:31
2.	"Dil Hai Tumhaara"	Kumar Sanu, Udit Narayan and Alka Yagnik	06:41
3.	"Chaaya Hai Jo Dil Pe"	Kavita Krishnamurthy, Shaan	04:36
4.	"Chaahe Zubaan"	Sonu Nigam, Alka Yagnik	04.37
5.	"Kasam Khake Kaho"	Kumar Sanu, Alka Yagnik	05:53
6.	"Mohabbat Dil Ka Sakoon"	Kumar Sanu, Udit Narayan and Alka Yagnik	05:37
7.	"O Sahiba O Sahiba"	Kavita Krishnamurthy, Sonu Nigam	04:52
8.	"Kabhi Hasna Hai Kabhi"	Tauseef Akhtar	05.16
9.	"Betabi Ka Khamoshi Ka"	Sarika Kapoor	01:57

== Reception ==
Dil Hai Tumhaara received generally mixed reviews, but Preity Zinta's performance was universally praised by critics, with those critical of the film marking her presence as its main highlight.

Derek Elley of Variety believed that Zinta's "star-quality playing" is the main reason to watch an otherwise formulaic picture. He further noted its "respectable" production values and praised Rekha for being "quietly commanding as the powerful but conflicted mom". Khalid Mohamed gave the film 2 stars and wrote, "Clearly, this enterprise is a showcase for the hi-energy and scampering spirit of Zinta. She’s fabulous but content-wise, the stuff is … empty." Ziya Us Salam of The Hindu believed that as far as director Shah is concerned, the film is "among the more lopsided, half-hearted films he has made in his long career" but he called Zinta "the life of this film". He concluded the review saying: "Take away Zinta and Dil Hai Tumhaara is a tiresome film in urgent need of heavy editing. Put Zinta in there and it becomes watchable frame-to-frame. Preity is there all through, purely due to her infectious charm." Similarly, Jitesh Pillai of The Times of India wrote, "it's Zinta, with her mixture of vulnerability and brashness, who delivers a wallop. She's the only bright spark in this dull dil drama."

Taran Adarsh from Bollywood Hungama gave the film 2.5 out of 5 stars, calling it "a film that is sure to pull your heart strings", and noted that : "in an author-backed role... Zinta steals the show with a sterling performance", which is "sure to win accolades from the junta and critics whole-heartedly". Mid-Day's S. Ramachandran believed that the film "has some touching moments, but cliched dialogues mar the script", and noted Zinta for excelling in her part. Sanjeev Singh Bariana of The Tribune was appreciative of the film, Zinta's central performance, and noted Shah for doing "a commendable job". Manish Gajjar from the BBC described the film as engaging, and liked the "emotional story" where "Shah explores the sensitive issue of a mother-daughter relationship", and took note of the performances of the cast, calling Zinta "superb" and Chaudhry "touching".

Piroj Wadia of Screen found the film unoriginal, depending on "formulaic love triangles, sibling rivalry in love, prototype character roles and the utter absence of logic". He did appreciate, however, the performances, labelling them the film's "redemption", and noted the unusually realistic portrayal of the sister bond and the camaraderie between Shalu (Zinta) and Nimmi (Chaudhry)." Subhash K. Jha of The Times of India called the film "delightfully comic", comparing it to Bimal Roy's Sujata (1959) and praising Zinta, who, "in a role tailor-made for her" ... displays a comic aptitude akin to Hollywood actress Goldie Hawn". Ronjita Kulkarni from Rediff.com accused the film of its "regressive thinking" and believed it might appeal particularly to Zinta's fans. She also positively reviewed the performances of Rekha and Choudhry, despite the latter's underdeveloped role.

== Awards ==
Nominated

Screen Award for Best Actress - Preity Zinta
