= Mahima Chaudhry =

Indian actress (born 1973)

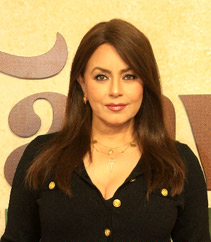
- Chaudhry in 2025
- Born: Ritu Chaudhry; 13 September 1973 (age 53); Darjeeling, West Bengal, India
- Occupation: Actress
- Years active: 1997–present
- Spouse: Bobby Mukherji (m. 2006; div. 2013)
- Children: 1

Mahima Chaudhry (born Ritu Chaudhry; 13 September 1973) is an Indian actress who primarily works in Hindi films. Mahima did a few modelling assignments and television commercials before venturing into films, with the 1997 romantic drama film Pardes, for which she received the Filmfare Award for Best Female Debut.

She played the leading lady in several films, including Daag (1999), Dhadkan (2000), and Kurukshetra (2000), and received critical recognition for her performances in Dil Kya Kare (1999), Lajja (2001), Dobara (2004) and The Film (2005) earning nominations for the Filmfare Award for Best Supporting Actress for Dil Kya Kare and Dhadkan. This was followed by a hiatus and intermittent acting roles.

== Early life ==
Mahima was born as Ritu Chaudhry to a Jat father from Baghpat District of Uttar Pradesh and a Nepalese-origin mother in Darjeeling, India. She attended Dow Hill School in Kurseong until class 10 and later moved to Loreto Convent, Darjeeling. Having grown up in the Darjeeling Hills region, she is fluent in both Hindi and Nepalese languages. She won the ‘Miss Darjeeling’ title in a local beauty contest.

Prior to her first release Pardes, she changed her name to Mahima Chaudhry upon the recommendation by her director Subhash Ghai, who believed the letter 'M' to be lucky for leading actresses in his films.

== Career ==
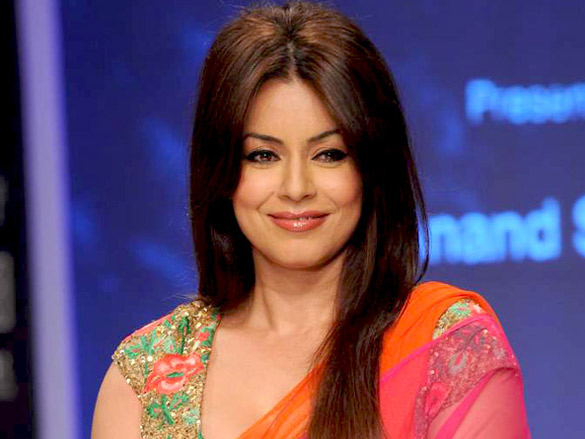
Chaudhry at an event in 2011

Chaudhry started her career as a video jockey. She made her acting debut with Pardes, in 1997. Chaudhry played a village girl opposite Shah Rukh Khan. The film was a major commercial success worldwide. For her performance, she won the Filmfare Award for Best Female Debut along with nomination for Best Actress.

Chaudhry's other roles were in Daag: The Fire (1999), where she played dual roles; in Pyaar Koi Khel Nahin (1999), she played a widow forced to marry her brother-in-law; in Dhadkan (2000) she is the loving friend of a man who is madly in love with another woman; in Deewane she plays a singer in love with a thief; in Kurukshetra she plays the stubborn wife of a police officer; in Lajja she plays a young bride forced to fight dowry; in Yeh Teraa Ghar Yeh Meraa Ghar (2001) she plays a stubborn tenant who will not give up her home at any cost; in Om Jai Jagadish she is a loving homemaker; in Dil Hai Tumhaara (2002) she plays a young woman who will do anything for her sister's happiness; in Dobara she is the frustrated housewife; in The Film she is a desperate struggling screenwriter; in Zameer: The Fire Within she is a paralytic dancer, in Film Star she is an uptight arrogant fading actress; in Home Delivery (2005) she is a South Indian superstar; and in Souten: The Other Woman (2006) she plays a desperate housewife who has an affair with her stepdaughter's boyfriend.

In 2010, Chaudhry starred in a Knightsbridge Media Production film, Pusher, directed by Assad Raja. She also worked in the thriller Mumbhaii - The Gangster, co-starring Om Puri and Sanjay Kapoor.

== Political activities ==
In the 2021 West Bengal elections, Chaudhry campaigned for some candidates from both Bharatiya Janata Party (BJP) and Trinamool Congress. In 2023, there was speculation of her joining the BJP ahead of the Madhya Pradesh elections, as she met the state Minister, Vishvas Sarang, and hailed the BJP government.

In 2024, Chaudhry came out in support of Prime Minister Modi, calling him an inspirational figure under whom India's respect has increased in the world.

== Personal life ==
In 1999, while shooting for Dil Kya Kare, Chaudhry was involved in a car crash; her car rammed into a truck in Bangalore and multiple pieces of glass had to be removed from her face as a result of the accident.

Chaudhry married architect Bobby Mukherji in 2006. Their daughter was born in 2007, and the couple separated in 2013.

Chaudhry was diagnosed and successfully treated for breast cancer in 2022. She mentioned that comedy shows such as Kapil Sharma Show helped her during her recovery from illness.

== Filmography ==
Key
†	Denotes films that have not yet been released

=== Films ===
Year	Film	Role	Notes
1997	Pardes	Kusum Ganga	Debut film
1999	Manasulo Maata	Priya	Telugu film
1999	Dil Kya Kare	Kavita Kishore	
1999	Daag: The Fire	Kajri Verma / Kajal	
1999	Pyaar Koi Khel Nahin	Nisha	
2000	Dhadkan	Sheetal Varma	
2000	Deewane	Pooja	
2000	Kurukshetra	Anjali P. Singh	
2000	Khiladi 420	Ritu Bhardwaj	
2001	Lajja	Maithili	
2001	Yeh Teraa Ghar Yeh Meraa Ghar	Saraswati	
2002	Om Jai Jagadish	Ayesha	
2002	Dil Hai Tumhaara	Nimmi	
2003	Saaya	Tanya	
2003	Tere Naam	Herself	Special appearance in song "O Jaana"
2003	Baghban	Arpita Alok Malhotra	
2003	LOC: Kargil	Reena Yadav	
2004	Dobara	Dr. Anjali Sehgal	
2005	Zameer: The Fire Within	Supriya Maheshwari	
2005	Kuchh Meetha Ho Jaye	Gulab Khan	
2005	Sehar	Anamika Kant	
2005	Film Star	Heera Pandit	
2005	The Film	Sushmita Banerjee	
2005	Home Delivery	Maya	
2005	Bhagmati	Bhagmati	Voice-over
2006	Souten: The Other Woman	Mitali 'Mita' R. Singh	
2006	Sandwich	Sweet Singh / Sweety Shekar	
2006	Kudiyon Ka Hai Zamana	Anjali	
2006	Mr 100%	Shilpa	
2006	Hope and a Little Sugar	Saloni	
2006	Sarhad Paar	Simran	
2008	Gumnaam – The Mystery	Ria	
2010	Pusher	Anita	
2014	Kaanchi	Herself	Special appearance
2015	Mumbhaii – The Gangster	Gangster's wife	
2016	Dark Chocolate	Ishani Banerjee	
2024	The Signature	Ambika "Ambu"	
2025	Emergency	Pupul Jayakar	
2025	Nadaaniyan	Neelu Jaisingh	
2025	Durlabh Prasad Ki Dusri Shadi	Babita	

=== Television ===
Year	Title	Role	Notes
1995–1996	Liberty Public Demand	Anchor	
2008–2009	Jalwa Four 2 Ka 1	Judge	
2010	Raaz Pichhle Janam Ka	Contestant	Episode 10
2012	Chhote Miyan	Judge	
2014	Ticket to Bollywood	Judge	

=== Music video ===
Year	Title	Performer(s)	Role	Album	Ref.
2002	"Tere Bina Chain Mujhe Ab Aaye Na"	Adnan Sami	Unnamed	Tera Chehra	

== Awards and nominations ==
Awards and nominations
Year	Film	Award	Category	Result	Ref.
1998	Pardes	Filmfare Awards	Best Female Debut	Won	
1998	Pardes	Filmfare Awards	Best Actress	Nominated	
1998	Pardes	Screen Awards	Most Promising Newcomer – Female	Nominated	
1998	Pardes	Zee Cine Awards	Best Female Debut	Won	
1999	Dil Kya Kare	Filmfare Awards	Best Supporting Actress	Nominated	
2000	Dhadkan	Filmfare Awards	Best Supporting Actress	Nominated	
2000	Dhadkan	International Indian Film Academy Awards	Best Supporting Actress	Nominated	
2000	Dhadkan	Screen Awards	Best Supporting Actress	Nominated	
2000	Dhadkan	Bollywood Movie Awards	Best Supporting Actress	Won	
2000	Dhadkan	Sansui Viewers' Choice Movie Awards	Best Supporting Actress	Won	
2005	Dobara	Stardust Awards	Best Supporting Actress	Nominated	
2005	Dobara	Zee Cine Awards	Best Supporting Actress	Nominated	

== See also ==
- List of Indian film actresses
