= Deewane =

2000 Indian film by Harry Baweja

- DVD Cover
- Directed by: Harry Baweja
- Written by: Anees Bazmee
- Screenplay by: Karan Razdan
- Produced by: Paramjeet Baweja
- Starring: Ajay Devgn; Urmila Matondkar; Mahima Chaudhry; Paresh Rawal; Gulshan Grover; Shivaji Satham
- Cinematography: Yogesh Jani
- Edited by: Kuldip Mehan
- Music by: Sanjeev-Darshan
- Production company: S. P. Creations
- Distributed by: Shemaroo Entertainment
- Release date: 11 August 2000
- Running time: 180 minutes
- Country: India
- Language: Hindi
- Budget: ₹85 million
- Box office: ₹122.5 million

Deewane is a 2000 Indian Hindi romantic action drama film that stars Ajay Devgn (in a double role), Urmila Matondkar and Mahima Chaudhary. After Bedardi and Kanoon, it was the third film Ajay and Urmila did together. The film was a semi hit at the box office.

== Plot ==
Vishal is a hard-working officer who takes care of his family and is in love with Sapna. Vishal's uncle Lekhraj is a top criminal. He is trying to kill Vishal because Vishal is trying to unveil the criminal without knowing it is the uncle whom he respects. Vishal's twin Arun is a robber. When Vishal is telling the Commissioner about Arun being his duplicate he is shot by Lehkraj's son. Vishal goes into a coma.

The Commissioner plots with Arun to portray him as Vishal the world's eyes. Sapna arrives when they are talking and the Commissioner tells Arun to hide behind the one-way transparent mirror. Arun ends up falling in love with Sapna. The Commissioner tells Vishal's family that Arun is Vishal.

Pooja loves Arun but Arun does not love her back. Time passes by and Vishal comes back from coma. Sapna is shocked and starts hating Arun because he did not tell her the truth. After that Arun keeps coming back based on Vishal's request to spend time with Sapna whenever he is busy chasing criminals. Sapna starts to love Arun. When Pooja finds out that Arun loves Sapna she is heartbroken. Sapna asks Arun what she should do. He tells her that he does not deserve her but Vishal does.

Vishal and Sapna decide to get married. The Commissioner finds out that the criminal terrorizing the city is Vishal's uncle. In trying to shoot Vishal, the uncle ends up shooting Arun. The uncle and his son are arrested and Arun survives. Just as he is leaving, Vishal stops him. It is revealed that when Pooja was telling Arun that Sapna loves Arun, she was actually talking to Vishal. Vishal unites Arun and Sapna. Vishal goes his own way, and so does Pooja.

== Cast ==
Cast	Role(s)
Ajay Devgan	Police Officer Vishal Singh / Arun Gupta (dual role)
Urmila Matondkar	Sapna Sharma
Mahima Chaudhry	Pooja Behl
Reema Lagoo	Vishal / Kamla, Arun's mother
Shivaji Satam	Mr. Amar Chouhan-Police Commissioner
Paresh Rawal	Lekhraj (gangster)
Johnny Lever	Ok
Pramod Moutho	Jumbo, Lekhraj's brother
Aasif Sheikh	Inder, Lekhraj's son
Gulshan Grover	Virendra, Vishal's cousin
Neha Pendse	Nimmo
Raju Mavani	Himself
Tiku Talsania	Narayan Sharma, Sapna's father
Padmini Kapila	Raksha, Sapna's mother
Dinesh Hingoo	Uncredited cameo

== Soundtrack ==
According to the Indian trade website Box Office India, with around 14,00,000 units sold, this film's soundtrack album was the year's thirteenth highest-selling. The track "Deewane" became the most popular one.

#	Title	Singer(s)	Length
1	"Deewane"	Kumar Sanu, Udit Narayan, Alka Yagnik	05:14
2	"Churao Na Dil"	Kavita Krishnamurthy, Udit Narayan	06:35
3	"Ishq Da Gunjal"	Sukhwinder Singh, Jaspinder Narula	06:17
4	"Ae Dil"	Jaspinder Narula	05:56
5	"Qayamat"	Sukhwinder Singh, Alka Yagnik	06:42
6	"Jogiya"	Sukhwinder Singh, Anuradha Paudwal	05:20
7	"Ae Dil"	Hariharan	05:49
8	"Sajna Ne Phool Marya"	Sukhwinder Singh, Jaspinder Narula	06:36

== Box office ==
The film was released on 11 August 2000 at budget of (₹9 cr)

On opening day collection was (₹0.70 cr) and first weekend collection was (₹2.09 cr). First week collection was (₹7 cr) and life time taking were (₹12 cr). India boxoffice nett gross collection was (₹6.95 cr) India boxoffice gross collection was (₹9.65 cr). Total netgross collection was (₹1,53,50,000) and film was considered as Flop at Box Office India.

=== Overseas ===
Territory	Territory wise collection
Overseas	(Opening weekend); US$0.06
Overseas	(Gross); US$0.58 cr
Overseas	(Total); US$0.13
International	(first weekend); US$26,400
International	(Total); US$45,000

Professional ratings
Review scores
Source	Rating
IMDb	7/10

It was 30th-highest-grossing film of 2000.
