= Dobara =

- DVD cover
- Directed by: Shashi Ranjan
- Starring: Jackie Shroff; Mahima Chaudhry; Raveena Tandon
- Cinematography: Arvind Kumar
- Edited by: Suresh Pai
- Music by: Anu Malik
- Release date: 24 September 2004
- Running time: 135 minutes
- Country: India
- Language: Hindi

Dobara (transl.: Again) is a 2004 Indian Hindi-language film directed by Shashi Ranjan on his debut. It stars Jackie Shroff, Mahima Chaudhry and Raveena Tandon.

== Plot ==
Ranveer and Anjali Sehgal, a happily married couple, find themselves in trouble when visited by an escapee from a mental asylum, Riya Deshmukh.

== Cast ==
- Jackie Shroff as Ranveer Sehgal
- Mahima Chaudhry as Dr. Anjali Sehgal
- Raveena Tandon as Riya Deshmukh
- Gulshan Grover as Truck Driver
- Soni Razdan as Mrs. Devika Mehta
- Vrajesh Hirjee
- Seema Biswas
- Moammar Rana

== Music ==
Dobara

Soundtrack album by Anu Malik
- Released: 26 June 2004
- Genre: Feature film soundtrack
- Label: Times Music

1. "Goonja Hua Hai" - Alka Yagnik
2. "Mujhse Kyun Roothe Ho" - Alka Yagnik
3. "Tum Abhi The" (Female) - Alka Yagnik
4. "Tum Abhi The (Male) - Hariharan
5. "Humnasheen" - Alisha Chinoy, Anu Malik
6. "Chadha Na Jaave" - Anu Malik
7. "Pyaar Mere" - Jasbir Jassi

== Reception ==
The film received a mixed reception by critics. Taran Adarsh praised the performances of the main actors and the music by Anu Malik such as 'Humnasheen' and 'Mujhse Kyon Roothe Ho?' but said "the sluggish pace of its narrative and classy treatment act as barricades. And the pre-climax portions, involving the child and the conclusion to the triangle, take the graph of the film downhill." Patcy N of Rediff.com criticised the script and remarked that "there were too many holes in it" and questioned the choice of film for a debut by the director.
