= Umar (film) =

- Poster
- Directed by: Karan Razdan
- Written by: Karan Razdan
- Screenplay by: Karan Razdan
- Produced by: P. D. Gupta
- Starring: Jimmy Shergill; Shenaz Treasurywala; Prem Chopra; Kader Khan; Satish Kaushik; Shakti Kapoor; Dalip Tahil
- Narrated by: Anupam Kher
- Cinematography: Aatish Parmar
- Edited by: Sanjay Verma
- Music by: Shamir Tandon
- Distributed by: Eros International
- Release date: 17 March 2006
- Country: India
- Language: Hindi

Umar (lit.: Age) is a 2006 Indian crime-drama film directed by Karan Razdan. The film stars Prem Chopra, Kader Khan, Satish Kaushik in the lead roles, with Jimmy Shergill, Shenaz Treasurywala, Shakti Kapoor, Dalip Tahil in supporting roles. The film follows a young man played by Jimmy who has been framed for a crime he did not even commit and is on the run from the police, aided by three elder men played by Prem Chopra, Kader Khan, Satish Kaushik. The story of the film was narrated by Anupam Kher.

== Plot ==
Chandrakant Mehta (Prem Chopra), Rajpal Singh (Satish Kaushik), and Iqbal Khan (Kader Khan) are best friends, living their last years in the United Kingdom. The lives of the men are complicated as Mehta and Singh are mistreated as servants by their children, and Khan is a victim of racial discrimination from the British community. However, they find solace and love in the form of a caring young man, Shashank Dutt (Jimmy Sheirgill). Shashank is a student who works as a part-time waiter and singer in a bar for a living and is in love with Sapna Lakha (Shenaz Treasurywala), daughter of a rich business tycoon Prem Lakha (Shakti Kapoor). Sapna introduces Shashank to her father for marriage, but the latter disagrees because of Shashank's status. However, the bar's owner, Victoria, falls for Shashank, and he rejects her advances, as he is still loyal to Sapna. But one day Victoria gets murdered, and all the evidence points towards Shashank. Shashank is arrested and jailed by the police thereafter. After learning this incident, the three men help Shashank escape, which also turns them into fugitives.

== Cast ==
- Jimmy Sheirgill as Shashank Dutt
- Shenaz Treasurywala as Sapna Lakha
- Prem Chopra as Chandrakant Mehta
- Kader Khan as Iqbal Khan
- Satish Kaushik as Rajpal Singh
- Shakti Kapoor as Prem Lakha
- Dalip Tahil as Ben Chibber / Banwari
- Rez Kempton as Girish Mehta
- Varun Juneja as Chucky Singh

== Critical reception ==
Film critic Taran Adarsh from Bollywood Hungama rated the film 1.5 out 5. Akash Gandhi rated the film 7.5 out of 10, praising the performances and direction of the film. Priyanka Jain from Rediff criticised the film with no ratings.

== Music ==
All music composed by Shamir Tandon.

- "Duniyawalon Ko Nahin Kuch Bhi Khabar", a Qawwali, is the last released song by the legendary singer Manna Dey, who was then 86, while recording.

1. "Aankhon Mein Tum" – Hariharan, Sunidhi Chauhan
2. "Akele Mein Hum To Ghabra Gaye" – Babul Supriyo
3. "Bechain Saansen" – Bhupinder Singh
4. "Duniyawalon Ko Nahin Kuch Bhi Khabar" – Manna Dey, Kavita Krishnamurthy, Sonu Nigam, Shabab Sabri
5. "Khumari Chadhke" – Jagjit Singh
6. "Piya" – Om (Band)
