= Kasoor =

2001 film directed by Vikram Bhatt

- Directed by: Vikram Bhatt
- Written by: Mahesh Bhatt; Girish Dhamija
- Produced by: Mukesh Bhatt
- Starring: Aftab Shivdasani; Lisa Ray; Irrfan Khan; Divya Dutta; Ashutosh Rana
- Cinematography: Pravin Bhatt
- Edited by: Amit Saxena
- Music by: Nadeem-Shravan
- Production company: Vishesh Films
- Distributed by: Eros International; Sony Pictures Networks India
- Release date: 2 February 2001
- Running time: 151 minutes
- Country: India
- Language: Hindi
- Budget: ₹3 crore
- Box office: ₹14.1 crore

Kasoor (transl. Fault) is a 2001 Indian Hindi-language legal thriller film directed by Vikram Bhatt and produced b Mukesh Bhatt's Vishesh Films. It stars Aftab Shivdasani and Lisa Ray in her Hindi film debut. Ray's voice was dubbed by Divya Dutta, while Shivdasani's voice was dubbed by Bhatt himself. Apoorva Agnihotri, Irrfan Khan, Divya Dutta, and Ashutosh Rana appear in supporting roles. The film was released on 2 February 2001, and was a critical and commercial success. It is notable for the soundtrack composed by Nadeem–Shravan.

The film is an unofficial remake of the 1985 American film Jagged Edge, with the climax being borrowed from the 2000 American horror film What Lies Beneath, which was also adapted unofficially by Bhatt into a full-fledged film in 2002.

== Plot ==
The film starts with the murder of Priti, wife of Shekhar, a wealthy and well-known journalist. Inspector Lokhande investigates the case and accuses Shekhar of the murder, saying he has enough evidence to arrest and convict him. However, upon getting bail from the court, Shekhar asks his lawyer to fight his case for him; however, his lawyer tells him that he will not be able to fight his case because he is a corporate lawyer and only fights civil cases. He suggests Shekhar ask Simran Bhargav, who is a skilled criminal lawyer in his firm, to fight his case.

Shekhar goes to Simran's house to convince her to take his case. Simran tells Shekhar that she'll defend him only if she is convinced that he is innocent. Simran is battling inner demons over a case in which she got a man convicted for a crime he had not committed. Her guilt increases when she learns that the innocent man had committed suicide in custody.

While representing Shekhar, whom she considers innocent, Simran falls in love with him – a part of Shekhar's plan to win her trust. They end up spending the night together. Throughout the case, a mysterious man sends clues to Simran, which helps her prove Shekhar's innocence. It is revealed that Shekhar's wife Priti was having an affair with Jimmy Pereira. After the court declares Shekhar innocent, Simran spends the night with Shekhar at his house & start Loving Him.

== Cast ==
- Aftab Shivdasani as Shekhar Saxena (voice dubbed by Vikram Bhatt)
- Lisa Ray as Advocate Simran Bhargav (voice dubbed by Divya Dutta)
- Apurva Agnihotri as Amit Bajpai, friend-Assistant Advocate of Simran Bhargav.
- Irrfan Khan as Public Prosecutor Nitin Mehta
- Divya Dutta as Payal Malhotra (voiced dubbed by Mona Ghosh Shetty)
- Ashutosh Rana as Senior Inspector Lokhande
- Chittaranjan Giri as Sub Inspector
- Anupam Shyam as Sub Inspector
- Firdaus Mevawala as Judge
- Maleeka Ghai as Priti Shekhar Saxena
- Vishwajeet Pradhan as witness Jimmy Pereira, Preeti's boyfriend.
- Prithvi Zutshi as Mr. Rajit Singh, Civil Lawyer.
- Sucheta Khanna as witness Shalini, Priti's friend.
- Kurush Deboo as witness, Rustam Sodabottleopenerwala
- Sushmita Daan as Witness, Miss Rita Desai Shekhar's former girlfriend.
- Murali Sharma as Mr. Singal, Simran's boss
- Pushkar Dwivedi as Chotu
- Ishwar Patel
- Kiran Randhawa

== Soundtrack ==
Kasoor

Studio album by Nadeem-Shravan
- Released: 25 August 2000
- Recorded: 2000
- Genre: Feature film soundtrack
- Label: Saregama
- Producer: Nadeem-Shravan

Nadeem-Shravan chronology
Dhadkan (2000)	Kasoor (2000)	Ek Rishtaa: The Bond of Love (2001)

=== Track listing ===
All lyrics are written by Sameer; all music is composed by Nadeem-Shravan.

No.	Title	Singer(s)	Length
1.	"Kitni Bechain Hoke"	Alka Yagnik, Udit Narayan	7:25
2.	"Zindagi Ban Gaye Ho Tum"	Alka Yagnik, Udit Narayan	5:35
3.	"Mohabbat Ho Na Jaye"	Kumar Sanu, Alka Yagnik	6:35
4.	"Koi To Saathi Chahiye"	Kumar Sanu	5:32
5.	"Kal Raat Ho Gayee"	Kumar Sanu, Alka Yagnik	7:32

== Reception ==
The film received mixed to positive reviews from critics. Taran Adarsh of Bollywood Hungama praised the performance of the lead cast saying, "Kasoor scores the most in that one important department — performances. Credit for this must go primarily to the two principal performers — Aftab Shivdasani and Lisa Ray — who come up with proficient performances." Aparajita Saha of Rediff.com stated, "this is a film that attempted an intriguing premise but failed when it didn't fully explore that very premise and take it to its logical and rightful conclusion."
