= C. Rajendra Prasad =

Indian cinematographer (1966–2022)

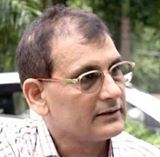
- Born: 1966; Hyderabad, India
- Died: 2022 (aged 55–56)
- Occupation: Cinematographer
- Years active: 1995–2017

C. Rajendra Prasad was an Indian cinematographer, writer, producer and director known for his works in Indian cinema. An alumnus of the Film and Television Institute of India, he made films across various Indian languages and Persian. Prasad is a Science graduate from Osmania University and graduate in Law from the University of Mumbai. In 1995 he founded his own production company, "Amateur Artists" He died due to bronchitis on 19 August 2022.

== Filmography ==
- Nirantharam (1995) – Writer, cinematographer, director, producer
- Man, Woman and the Mouse (2000) – Writer, cinematographer, director, producer
- Inscrutable Americans (2001) – Director of Photography
- Patth (2003) – Director of Photography
- Girlfriend (2004) – Director of photography
- Hawas (2004) – Director of photography
- Megham in Telugu (2004) – Director of photography
- Residue - Where the Truth Lies (2005) – Writer, cinematographer, director, producer
- Eight: The Power of Shani (2006) – Director of photography
- Saawan... The Love Season (2006) – Director of photography
- Game (2007) – Director of photography
- Mittal v/s Mittal (2010) – Director of photography
- Aagaah: The Warning (2011) - Director of photography
- Sisira in Telugu – Director of photography
- Divana-e-Ishq in Persian (2013) – Director of photography
- All Lights, No Stars (2016) – Writer, cinematographer, director, producer
- Call for Fun (2017) – Director of photography
