= Nirantharam =

1995 Indian Telugu drama film by Rajendra Prasad

Nirantharam – The Incessant
- Directed by: C. Rajendra Prasad
- Written by: Madhukar (dialogues)
- Story by: C. Rajendra Prasad
- Produced by: Chandra Siddhartha
- Starring: Raghubir Yadav; Subhalekha Sudhakar
- Cinematography: C. Rajendra Prasad
- Edited by: Govind Dubey
- Music by: Keerthi Anurag
- Production company: Film and Television Institute of India
- Distributed by: Amateur Artists
- Release date: 1995
- Running time: 99 mins
- Country: India
- Language: Telugu

Nirantharam – The Incessant (Note: Also spelled Nirantaram) is a 1995 Telugu drama film, written and directed by C. Rajendra Prasad.

== Plot ==
The story is set against the backdrop of the 1948 Telangana Rebellion.

== Cast ==
- Raghubir Yadav
- Subhalekha Sudhakar
- Suhas Palshikar
- Madhukar Toradmal
- Chinmayee Surve
- Anantha Prabhu
- M.B.K.V. Prasada Rao
- Baby Manasa

== Production ==
Produced by Chandra Siddhartha and the Film and Television Institute of India, the film was screened at the Cairo International Film Festival.
