= Zameer (2005 film) =

2005 Indian film by Kamal

- Movie poster
- Directed by: Kamal
- Written by: Sreenivasan; Sanjay Masoom (dialogue)
- Based on: Mazhayethum Munpe by Kamal
- Produced by: Nitin Raj Aryadath
- Starring: Ajay Devgn; Ameesha Patel; Mahima Chaudhry
- Cinematography: Hari Nair
- Edited by: Raj Gopal; Pappu Sharma
- Music by: Jatin–Lalit
- Distributed by: NH Studioz
- Release date: 4 March 2005
- Running time: 150 minutes
- Country: India
- Language: Hindi
- Budget: ₹4.50 crore
- Box office: ₹1.58 crore

Zameer: The Fire Within is a 2005 Indian Hindi-language romantic drama film directed by Kamal, starring Ajay Devgn, Ameesha Patel, and Mahima Chaudhry. The film was a remake of Kamal's Malayalam film Mazhayethum Munpe. It was formerly titled "Rahe Naa Rahe Hum" and began production in 1999. It was delayed for almost 5 years. The film was released on 4 March 2005 and was a box-office disaster.

== Plot ==
The film begins in Kolkata. Suraj is leading a life of anonymity. But Dildar, a friend and confidant, convinces him to return.

The flashback begins: Suraj is a chemistry professor in a women's college. One of the students, Pooja, is a spoilt and bratty girl who believes in playing pranks in the classroom, including bursting crackers to 'welcome' the new professor.

Suraj's heart beats for Supriya, who has had an attack of paralysis. She is undergoing treatment in an Ayurvedic hospital. In the meantime, Pooja continues to rag Suraj — at home, at college, and even at Dildar's wedding anniversary.

The story takes a turn when Supriya's father informs Suraj that Supriya has started walking without any kind of support. Pooja plays a cruel joke on Suraj, pretending to have a brain tumor. This infuriates Suraj. But Pooja has fallen in love with him.

Pooja now openly professes love for Suraj. To clear any kind of confusion, Suraj introduces Supriya as his 'love and life' to Pooja and her friends. Pooja takes it as an insult and considers Suraj a sadist. Pooja decides to quit college and blames Supriya for it. Pooja confronts Supriya, lying to her that Suraj merely sympathizes with her since she is unwell.

On her father's insistence, Pooja rejoins her college. There, she learns that Supriya has been hospitalized since she suffered a mental shock. At this stage, Supriya decides to break off her engagement with Suraj and requests that he marry Pooja.

Supriya's father also wants them to marry, since that's what Supriya desires. After a bit of hesitation, Suraj marries Pooja. But post-marriage, the guilt of having wronged Supriya drives Pooja into depression.

Pooja admits her selfish attitude to Supriya; at this point, Supriya's father bursts out and spits venom on Pooja. Suraj walks in at this juncture and gets to know the truth, and he walks out on Pooja.

Five years later, Suraj learns that Pooja had committed suicide. But before killing herself, Pooja had given birth to a baby girl who is now being mothered by Supriya, who has fully recovered. Suraj forgives Pooja and unites with Supriya and his daughter, who was also named Pooja by Supriya.

== Cast ==
- Ajay Devgn as Suraj Chauhan
- Ameesha Patel as Pooja D. Khanna / Pooja S. Chauhan
  - Bhavika as young Pooja S. Chauhan
- Mahima Chaudhry as Supriya Maheshwari
- Dinesh Hingoo as Taxi driver
- Shakti Kapoor as Dildar - Suraj's friend
- Supriya Karnik as Kulwant - Dildar's wife
- Kulbhushan Kharbanda as Mr. Maheshwari
- Alok Nath as Deepraj Khanna
- Sambhavna Seth as an item dancer

== Soundtrack ==
The soundtrack was composed by Jatin–Lalit.

#	Title	Singer(s)	Lyricist	Music
1.	"Tum Kitne Bechain Ho"	Sonu Nigam, Anuradha Paudwal	Sameer	Nikhil-Vinay
2.	"Dil Ke Badle Dil To"	Babul Supriyo, Shreya Ghoshal	Praveen Bhardwaj	Nikhil-Vinay
3.	"Pardesi Pardesi"	Kumar Sanu, Alka Yagnik, Sapna Awasthi	Sameer	Jatin–Lalit
4.	"Zindagi Ke Faisle Mein"	Udit Narayan	Israr Ansari	Jatin–Lalit
5.	"Tere Pyar Ne Deewana"	Babul Supriyo, Alka Yagnik	Sameer	Jatin–Lalit
6.	"Dil Ye Dua De"	Udit Narayan, Kavita Krishnamurthy	Sameer	Jatin–Lalit
7.	"Kum Nahin Kisi Se"	Kavita Krishnamurthy	Sameer	Jatin–Lalit
