= Dhadkan (2000 film) =

2000 Indian film by Dharmesh Darshan

- Theatrical release poster
- Directed by: Dharmesh Darshan
- Written by: Naseem Mukri; Dharmesh Darshan (dialogues)
- Screenplay by: Naseem Mukri; Raj Sinha
- Produced by: Ratan Jain
- Starring: Akshay Kumar; Suniel Shetty; Shilpa Shetty; Mahima Chaudhry
- Cinematography: W. B. Rao
- Edited by: Bharat Singh
- Music by: Songs: Nadeem–Shravan; Score: Surinder Sodhi
- Production company: Venus Records & Tapes
- Distributed by: B4U Films
- Release date: 11 August 2000
- Running time: 161 minutes
- Country: India
- Language: Hindi
- Budget: ₹9.50 crore
- Box office: ₹26.47 crore

Dhadkan (transl. Heartbeat) is a 2000 Indian Hindi-language musical romantic drama directed by Dharmesh Darshan and produced by Ratan Jain. It stars Akshay Kumar, Suniel Shetty, Shilpa Shetty and Mahima Chaudhry in lead roles. It also features Sharmila Tagore, Parmeet Sethi, Kiran Kumar, Sushma Seth and Manjeet Kullar in supporting roles.

A loose adaptation of Wuthering Heights by Emily Brontë, the story follows Anjali Chauhan and Dev Chopra, who are in love with each other and plan to marry, but her family gets her forcefully married to Ram Verma. Years later, Dev shows up to reunite with Anjali. The music was composed by Nadeem–Shravan.

Delayed for almost four years for various reasons, Dhadkan finally released on August 11, 2000, coinciding with the Independence Day weekend. It emerged as a commercial success at the box office, grossing ₹26 crore worldwide.

At the 46th Filmfare Awards, Dhadkan received 10 nominations, including Best Film, Best Director (Darshan), Best Actor (Kumar), Best Supporting Actress (Chaudhry) and Best Music Director (Nadeem–Shravan), and won 2 awards – Best Villain (Suniel Shetty) and Best Female Playback Singer (Alka Yagnik for "Dil Ne Yeh Kaha Hai Dil Se").

== Plot ==
Anjali Chauhan is a young woman. Her rich and influential father, Narendra Chauhan, is a renowned businessman. Anjali is dating the poor Dev Chopra, who cannot even afford to clothe himself properly. He loves Anjali, too. Dev's mother, Jhanvi Chopra, dotes on Dev and is ecstatic to meet Anjali. Dev is the illegitimate son of his unwed mother, so he has no father. Jhanvi trusts Anjali to take care of Dev and never hurt him, as society has. When Anjali puts forward the proposal of marrying Dev to Narendra (after Narendra informs Anjali that he has fixed her wedding, she begs him to meet Dev once), he decides to meet Dev. After meeting him, Narendra doesn't like his attitude (Dev is unshaven, in ordinary clothes and sandals. Dev says if Narendra doesn't give his consent to the wedding, he will take away Anjali forcefully) and rejects him. Dev wants Anjali to leave with him, but Anjali refuses and promises to meet him later.

Anjali leaves Dev so as not to upset Narendra and her mother, Veena Chauhan. Anjali wanted to leave her house, but Narendra threatens to commit suicide if she took this step. Narendra agrees to let Anjali keep her promise to meet Dev, where she tells him that she has come to leave him. Dev is shocked and promises to destroy everything he holds dear if he can't get Anjali. Heartbroken, Dev tells this to his mother, Jhanvi, who dies in shock as she liked Anjali a lot. Under pressure, Anjali marries Ram Verma, an idealistic man, in an arranged marriage.

Ram lives in Delhi with his step-mother Vibha Verma, step-brother Bobby Verma, and step sister Nikki Verma. Ram is 75% owner of the business, and the rest of the family owns 25%. Bobby and Nikki resent him for this. Vibha wants to turn Ram against Anjali, and thus needles Anjali to hand over her jewels to her. Anjali refuses. Ram advises her to listen to Vibha. Anjali prepares to leave the house when her maid shows her how Vibha and Nikki are plotting against Ram and Anjali. Ram tells Anjali that he knows everything and wants to win everyone over with unconditional love. When Ram is away at work, Bobby tries to seduce Anjali, but she refutes his advances. Ram catches them live, and the matter escalates to Vibha. Vibha blames Anjali, but Ram defends her, saying Vibha and Bobby are lying. Vibha decides to leave the house with Bobby and Nikki after Ram puts his foot down.

After seeing the magnanimity of Ram's heart in accepting her, Anjali realizes she has fallen in love with him. Ram too falls in love with her. They confess their love and consummate their marriage.

3 years later, Ram and Anjali celebrate their 3rd wedding anniversary. Dev returns and is now a wealthy businessman. Anjali is stuck at a crossroads on where she would stand - for Ram or Dev. Dev makes it clear that he wants to get back together with Anjali and pursues her through all available means. Sheetal is Dev's business partner and adores him. Anjali stands for Ram, whom she deeply loves, and refuses to return to Dev.

Dev cannot stand rejection for the second time and sets out to ruin Ram's life. Dev partners with Vibha, Nikki, and Bobby. He finds out that Ram had taken heavy loans from the market for his new project and buys all the debt from the market, leading Ram to auction his house and give up his shares. Meanwhile, Nikki and Bobby start withdrawing money from the company, without telling Vibha. Sheetal finds out and objects. Bobby and Nikki yell at Vibha when she also scolds them. Vibha now remembers Ram. Narendra finds out and confronts Dev. He tells Dev that his attitude sucked 3 years ago, and it sucks now too, and he is glad that he chose Ram for his daughter.

Anjali gets pregnant. Anjali meets Dev and begs Dev to leave her alone. Ram also meets Dev (as he found out about the affair between Dev and Anjali). Ram explains to Dev that he has not lost, and Ram has not won; they both love Anjali. He shows unconditional love to Dev. Dev decides to finally let Anjali go and marry his business partner. He departs with her to London as Anjali and Ram look on.

== Cast ==
- Akshay Kumar as Ram Verma, Anjali's husband.
- Suniel Shetty as Dev Chopra, Anjali's love interest.
- Shilpa Shetty as Anjali Ram Verma (née Chauhan), Ram's wife.
- Mahima Chaudhry as Sheetal Varma, Dev's business partner.
- Sushma Seth as Vibha Verma
- Parmeet Sethi as Bobby "Bob" Verma
- Manjeet Kullar as Nikki Verma
- Naseem Mukri as Mrs. Malhotra
- Kiran Kumar as Narendra Chauhan, Anjali's father.
- Anjana Mumtaz as Veena Chauhan, Anjali's mother.
- Neeraj Vora as Babban Miyan
- Sharmila Tagore as Janhvi Chopra, Dev's mother.
- Anupam Kher as Sheetal's father
- Kader Khan as priest in the song "Dulhe Ka Sehra"

== Music ==
Dhadkan

Soundtrack album by Nadeem–Shravan
- Released: 2 July 2000
- Recorded: 1997–1999
- Genre: Filmi
- Length: 59:14
- Language: Hindi
- Label: Venus
- Producer: Nadeem–Shravan

Nadeem–Shravan chronology
Sirf Tum (1999)	Dhadkan (2000)	Kasoor (2001)

The music of the album has been composed by the duo Nadeem–Shravan in the span of three years. "Dulhe Ka Sehra" sung by Nusrat Fateh Ali Khan was composed in 1997, while other songs were recorded in 1997-1998, with the exception of "Tum Dil Ki Dhadkan Mein", which was recorded in 2000 at London.

The album was listed in second position in the yearly music charts. According to the Indian trade website Box Office India, around 4.5 million units were sold making it the second highest-selling album of the year after Mohabbatein. The soundtrack was #73 on the list of 100 Greatest Bollywood Soundtracks of All Time, as compiled by Planet Bollywood.

All lyrics are written by Sameer Anjaan; all music is composed by Nadeem–Shravan.

Track listing
No.	Title	Singer(s)	Length
1.	"Dil Ne Yeh Kaha Hain Dil Se"	Udit Narayan, Kumar Sanu & Alka Yagnik	7:06
2.	"Tum Dil Ki Dhadkan Mein"	Abhijeet & Alka Yagnik	5:51
3.	"Dulhe Ka Sehra" (Male Version)	Ustad Nusrat Fateh Ali Khan	8:32
4.	"Dil Ne Yeh Kaha Hain Dil Se 2"	Sonu Nigam & Alka Yagnik	5:47
5.	"Tum Dil Ki Dhadkan Mein" (Sad Version)	Kumar Sanu	5:14
6.	"Na Na Karte Pyar"	Udit Narayan & Alka Yagnik	6:36
7.	"Aksar Is Duniya Mein"	Alka Yagnik	5:42
8.	"Tum Dil Ki Dhadkan Mein" (Instrumental)	Nadeem–Shravan	5:52
9.	"Dulhe Ka Sehra" (Female Version)	Jaspinder Narula	8:33
Total length:			59:14

== Reception ==
Taran Adarsh wrote of the film:

Dhadkan is an intense love story and director Dharmesh Darshan has handled it with the sensitivity it deserves ... Despite the flaws, one has to acknowledge the fact that Dharmesh Darshan succeeds in melting the heart at several places. The entire marriage song-sequence in the initial reels, prior to it the scenes involving Sharmila Tagore, Sunil's portions in the second half, clearly indicate that the director knows his job well. He relies more on close-ups to capture expressions, which is the hallmark of a seasoned technician.

Adarsh described Shilpa Shetty as the "life of the enterprise", adding that she "looks good, delivers her lines effectively and emotes with utmost conviction."He said Sunil Shetty's performance is one of his best, especially the scenes between Sunil and Shilpa are fabulous." He also remarked "Akshay Kumar shows vast improvement as an actor. He is very controlled and handles this difficult role with sincerity."

Padmaraj Nair of Screen felt the film had a "nostalgic feel to it, what with the effect of watching social drama from the good ol' 60s." He added that the film was "fairly interesting in the first half, with its slick screenplay, But the director does seem to lose his grip towards the end, as the film climaxes rather tamely. It seems as if he developed cold feet as far as justifying the grey role of Sunil Shetty is concerned, and ends up portraying him on a positive note." He felt, performance-wise, Shetty "scores over the rest", while adding, "Shilpa gets the best role of her career and doesn't disappoint. Akshay Kumar, in the role of the cool-headed husband, is impressive." On other departments of the film, he concluded writing, "Nadeem-Shravan's music is the very lifeline of the film, and all the tracks are melodious and situational. Cinematography by W. B. Rao is outstanding."

== Awards and nominations ==
46th Filmfare Awards:

Won

- Best Villain – Suniel Shetty
- Best Female Playback Singer – Alka Yagnik for "Dil Ne Yeh Kaha Hai Dil Se"

Nominated

- Best Film – Ratan Jain
- Best Actor - Akshay Kumar
- Best Director – Dharmesh Darshan
- Best Supporting Actress – Mahima Chaudhry
- Best Music Director – Nadeem–Shravan
- Best Lyricist – Sameer for "Tum Dil Ki Dhadkan Main"
- Best Male Playback Singer – Udit Narayan for "Dil Ne Yeh Kaha Hai Dil Se"

2nd IIFA Awards:

Nominated

- Best Film – Ratan Jain
- Best Director – Dharmesh Darshan
- Best Actor – Akshay Kumar
- Best Actress – Shilpa Shetty
- Best Supporting Actress – Mahima Chaudhry
- Best Villain – Suniel Shetty
- Best Music Director – Nadeem–Shravan
- Best Lyricist – Sameer for "Tum Dil Ki Dhadkan Main"
- Best Male Playback Singer – Abhijeet for "Tum Dil Ki Dhadkan Main"
- Best Female Playback Singer – Alka Yagnik for "Dil Ne Yeh Kaha Hai Dil Se"
- Best Story – Dharmesh Darshan

Screen Awards

Won

Category	Winner(s)
Best Publicity Design	Himanshu Nanda, Rahul Nanda
Best Negative Role Film Fare Award	Sunil Shetty

Nominated

Category	Nominees	For
Best Lyricist	Sameer	"Dil Ne Ye Kaha Hai"
Best Music Director	Nadeem–Shravan	Best Music Director
Best Female Playback	Alka Yagnik	"Dil Ne Ye Kaha Hai"
Best Male Playback	Abhijeet	"Tum Dil Ki Dhadkan"
Best Male Playback	Udit Narayan	"Dil Ne Ye Kaha Hai"
Best Supporting Actress	Mahima Chaudhry	Best Supporting Actress

== Box office ==
The film was released on 11 August 2000 at 250 screens. Dhadkan had a worldwide theatrical release on August 11, 2000, during the Independence Day weekend and garnered predominantly positive reviews. It emerged as a box office success grossing ₹26 crore worldwide. The film’s music, composed by Nadeem – Shravan, went on to break records.

== Remake ==
This film was remade in Dhivehi as Hiiy Edhenee in 2001, in Bangladeshi Bengali as Hridoyer Bandhon in 2001 and Telugu as Ramdev in 2010
