= Sheen (film) =

- Directed by: Ashok Pandit
- Screenplay by: Raman Kumar
- Produced by: Ashok Pandit
- Starring: Raj Babbar; Tarun Arora; Sheen
- Cinematography: Nadeem Khan
- Edited by: Kuldip Mehan
- Music by: Nadeem-Shravan
- Release date: 7 May 2004 (India)
- Country: India
- Language: Hindi

Sheen (Kashmiri/Sanskrit: Snow) is a 2004 Indian Bollywood film produced and directed by Ashok Pandit. It stars Raj Babbar, Tarun Arora and Sheen in pivotal roles.The film deals with the plight of the Kashmiri Pandits, who fled their homes as refugees in the light of the Kashmir insurgency.

== Cast ==
- Raj Babbar as Pandit Amarnath
- Tarun Arora as Mannu
- Samreen Zaidi as Sheen
- Anup Soni as Khalid
- Kiran Juneja as Shraddha
- Mukesh Rishi as Balwinder

== Soundtrack ==
The music for the film is composed by Nadeem-Shravan.

#	Title	Singer(s)
1	"Tum Dua Karo"	Kumar Sanu, Neerja Pandit
2	"Yeh To Kashmir Hai"	Udit Narayan, Alka Yagnik
3	"Sahara Chahiye"	Amin Sabri, Farid Sabri
4	"Aao Jannat Mein"	Kumar Sanu, Mohammed Aziz, Udit Narayan, Shreya Ghoshal, Neerja Pandit
5	"Main Ladki Kashmir Ki"	Kavita Krishnamurthy
6	"O Sanam Kuja Beri"	Sonu Nigam, Sapna Mukherjee
7	"Sheen Theme" (Instrumental)	

== Release and Reception ==
A special screening of the film was held at Human Rights Violation Conference in Geneva on 8 April 2004. The film was released theatrically in India on 7 May 2004.

Taran Adarsh of IndiaFM gave the film 1.5 stars out of 5, writing ″If SHEEN belongs to anyone, it's Raj Babbar who delivers a knock-out performance. The veteran seems to be in form after a long, long time and has been offered a role where he can sink his teeth into. The helplessness of a father and that of being uprooted is performed in the most convincing manner by the actor. Anoop Soni as the terrorist leaves an equally strong impression. Sheen makes a confident debut. Tarun Arora draws a blank this time around. He gets no scope at all. Kiran Juneja and Samay Pandit are adequate. On the whole, SHEEN will meet with diverse reactions - a few might empathize with the issue, while others may not really want to reopen the wounds.
