= Mittal v/s Mittal =

Mittal V/S Mittal
- Promotion poster
- Directed by: Karan Razdan
- Screenplay by: Karan Razdan
- Produced by: Rajeev Kore; Dinesh Chugh
- Starring: Rohit Roy; Rituparna Sen Gupta; Suchitra Krishnamoorthi; Gulshan Grover; Dolly Thakore; Reema Lagoo; Anjan Srivastav; Iravati Harshe
- Cinematography: C. Rajendra Prasad
- Edited by: Sanjay Verma
- Production company: Shaila Films Productions
- Distributed by: Bajoria Entertainment Worldwide Release
- Release date: 26 March 2010
- Country: India
- Language: Hindi

Mittal v/s Mittal is a 2010 Indian Hindi-language drama film written and directed by Karan Razdan and produced by Rajeev Kore and Dinesh Chugh. The film documents a case that strongly advocates for the rights of women who are subjugated to domestic violence and inhuman treatment. The film, starring Rohit Roy and Rituparna Sengupta, released on 26 March 2010 to mixed critical reviews and proved to be a box office failure.

== Plot ==
Mitali, a successful model, meets Karan, the Mittal scion, the heir to one of the richest families in the country. Even though Mitali‘s simple middle-class upbringing is a complete contrast to Karan's rich brat lifestyle, Karan is smitten by Mitali. Being accustomed to getting what he wants in life, Karan lands at Mitali's home with his parents with a marriage proposal. Delighted at their daughter's luck, Mitali's family approves the match and they get married.

It was not long before Mitali's dreams turned into her worst nightmare. Her mother-in-law started loathing her and became instrumental in creating misunderstandings between Karan and her. Karan turned out to be a puppet in his mother's hands and her father-in-law was nothing but a helpless, mute spectator. Karan has a certain pattern of dealing with women and wanted to subdue Mitali's independent frame of mind. He who was a loving husband was in fact a violent monster at night within the privacy of their bedroom. Unable to bear the humiliation and pain after she resisted his advances and being raped by him, Mitali decided to take charge of her life. She decided to fight back and walked out of her in-law's home. By hiring a lawyer and filing a case against her husband, she started her own battle against discrimination and domestic violence. Karan retaliated by hiring the best lawyer that money can buy to defend himself.

== Cast ==
- Rohit Roy as Karan Mittal
- Rituparna Sengupta as Mitali Mittal
- Gulshan Grover as Harish Salunke
- Suchitra Krishnamoorthi as Karuna Maheshwari
- Dolly Thakore as Karan's Mother
- Amar Talwar as Karan's Father
- Reema Lagoo as Mitali's Mother
- Anjan Srivastav as Mitali's Father
- Iravati Harshe as Ramola
- Hazel Crowney as Special appearance for item song

== Soundtrack ==
The music was composed by Shamir Tandon and released by T-Series.

Mittal v/s Mittal

Soundtrack album by Shamir Tandon
- Released: Apr 3, 2010
- Recorded: 2010
- Genre: Soundtrack
- Length: 32:26
- Label: T-Series
- Producer: Shamir Tandon

Shamir Tandon chronology
Jail (2009)	Mittal v/s Mittal (2010)	Click (2010)

Track list
No.	Title	Lyrics	Singer(s)	Length
1.	"Aao Seene Se Lag Ke"	Shabbir Ahmed	Kailash Kher	8:52
2.	"Khuda Haafiz"	Shabbir Ahmed	Mauli Dave	5:14
3.	"Chal Chal"	Shabbir Ahmed	Sunidhi Chauhan	4:30
4.	"Aao Seene Se Lag Ke" (Lounge Version)	Shabbir Ahmed	Kailash Kher, Sonu Kakkar	4:48
5.	"Khuda Haafiz" (Club Mix)	Shabbir Ahmed	Parichay, Roach Killa, Mauli Dave	4:06
6.	"Mittal Vs Mittal" (Theme Music)		Instrumental	4:56
Total length:				32:26
