= Girlfriend (2004 film) =

- Film poster
- Directed by: Karan Razdan
- Written by: Karan Razdan
- Produced by: Pammi Baweja
- Starring: Isha Koppikar; Amrita Arora; Aashish Chaudhary
- Cinematography: C. Rajendra Prasad
- Music by: Daboo Malik
- Production company: Baweja Movies
- Distributed by: T-Series; Shemaroo Entertainment
- Release date: 11 June 2004
- Running time: 120 min.
- Country: India
- Language: Hindi

Girlfriend is a 2004 Indian Hindi-language romantic thriller film written and directed by Karan Razdan and produced by Pammi Baweja. It focuses on Tanya's (Isha Koppikar) obsessive relationship with Sapna (Amrita Arora), especially after Sapna starts dating Rahul (Aashish Chaudhary).

Released on 11 June 2004, the film was mired in controversies and drew flak due to its portrayal of homosexuality.

== Plot ==
Tanya and Sapna are friends. Tanya never liked men from the very beginning. Tanya and Sapna share a relationship that is more than just being friends; they had a physical relationship while they were intoxicated. Though Sapna never considered Tanya a lesbian, she always trusted her as a friend. Tanya has strong feelings for Sapna and is quite possessive about her, and it is not revealed to Sapna. Then, a boy named Rahul comes into Sapna's life, and they fall in love with each other and decide to get married. Tanya becomes envious of the growing closeness of Sapna and Rahul, and her hatred towards Rahul and other men increases. One night, Rahul is injured when a mysterious masked person attacks him. Tanya, who is also a kickboxing champion, beats a male opponent in a fight. Sapna distrusts Rahul when he tries to make her understand that Tanya loves her. Sapna says that when they were drunk, they had sexual contact, but in real life, they are not lesbians, just close friends.

One day Sapna learns that Tanya is a lesbian and she starts to loves her. Sapna starts hating Tanya when she discovers the truth about her. On the same day, Tanya sneaks into Rahul's house and beats him. Tanya tells Rahul that she was the masked person who attacked him and that she loves Sapna. Sapna arrives at Rahul's house and finds Tanya covered in blood and Rahul lying on the ground unconscious; however, Rahul regains consciousness and electrocutes Tanya. Then, she regains consciousness and runs towards Rahul to throw him out of the building's window, but Rahul steps aside, and Tanya falls from the window and dies. In the end, Rahul and Sapna bring flowers to Tanya's grave.

== Cast ==
- Isha Koppikar as Tanya Singh
- Aashish Chaudhary as Rahul Chaudhary
- Amrita Arora as Sapna Verma
- Sumeet Nijhawan as Sameer (special appearance)
- Shantanu Chappana
- Dolly Malhotra

== Soundtrack ==
The music director of the film is Daboo Malik. The singers include Shreya Ghosal, Sonu Nigam, Daboo Malik, Sowmya Raoh, Shaan, Kumar Sanu, Abhijeet, Sunidhi Chauhan and Vaishali Samant.

Track list
No.	Title	Artist(s)	Length
1.	"Bheegi Bheegi"	Dabboo Malik, Sowmya Raoh, Shaan	5:01
2.	"Hamara Dil"	Abhijeet, Sunidhi Chauhan	6:16
3.	"Suno To Jaana Jaana"	Sunidhi Chauhan, Vaishali Samant	4:45
4.	"Tere Chehre Se"	Kumar Sanu, Shreya Ghoshal	5:48
5.	"Thodi Tumse Shararat"	Shreya Ghoshal, Sonu Nigam	6:24
6.	"Thodi Tumse Shararat" (sad version)	Sonu Nigam	5:28

== Reception ==
S. Viswanath of Deccan Herald wrote that "It offers neither viagra nor ecstasy to provide the soporific you need. Lose no sleep over it". Taran Adarsh of IndiaFM gave the film two and a half out of five, writing, "On the whole, GIRL FRIEND has two strong points to woo the Indian masses ? sex and shock-value."

== See also ==
- List of Hindi films of 2004
