= Pyaar Koi Khel Nahin =

- Theatrical release poster
- Directed by: Subhash Sehgal
- Written by: Subhash Sehgal
- Produced by: Sibte Hassan Rizvi
- Starring: Sunny Deol; Mahima Chaudhry; Apoorva Agnihotri; Kulbhushan Kharbanda; Reema Lagoo; Dina Pathak
- Cinematography: Harmeet Singh
- Edited by: Subhash Sehgal
- Music by: Jatin–Lalit
- Production companies: PolyGram India Ltd; TriStar International
- Distributed by: Venus Worldwide Entertainment
- Release date: 30 July 1999
- Running time: 165 minutes
- Country: India
- Language: Hindi
- Box office: ₹6.8 crore

Pyaar Koi Khel Nahin (transl. Love is not any game) is a 1999 Indian Hindi language romantic thriller film directed by Subhash Sehgal and produced by Sibte Hassan Rizvi. It stars Sunny Deol and Mahima Chaudhry, with Apoorva Agnihotri, Kulbhushan Kharbanda, Reema Lagoo and Dina Pathak in supporting roles. The film's music was composed by Jatin–Lalit with lyrics written by Majrooh Sultanpuri.

== Plot ==
Sunil and Ashok are friends of marriageable age. One day, Ashok's mother asks him to meet Shalu for matrimonial alliance. Ashok is reluctant to do so and asks Sunil to impersonate him and somehow reject Shalu so that his mom will be satisfied and not pester him anymore.

In the meantime, Shalu and Nisha have also made a similar decision and have planned to deceive Sunil. However, when the two couples meet, Sunil and Nisha fall in love, but are unable to reveal their identities to each other. When they do so, they meet each other's parents, and want to get married.

Now enters Sunil's elder brother, Anand, and complications abound. Anand is a successful businessman for whom Nisha works. He is in love with her and would like to marry her, but when he finds out that his brother loves her, he steps down. Sunil and Nisha get married and eventually have a kid. Soon Sunil is killed by Anand's business partners, who mistake him to be Anand. Nisha's parents want her to get married again, so Anand marries her as he still loves her. They were living a blissful married life when Anand later finds out that Sunil is alive. He brings Sunil back home, even though Sunil had left because he learnt Anand loved Nisha and is now married to her. Anand sacrifices his life intentionally by the bad guys while killing all of them, so that Nisha and Sunil could unite. Sunil and Nisha live happily along with their child.

== Cast ==
- Sunny Deol as Anand
- Mahima Chaudhry as Nisha Kapoor/Shalu
- Apoorva Agnihotri as Sunil / Ashok Khanna
- Kulbhushan Kharbanda as Sunil and Anand's father
- Reema Lagoo as Sunil and Anand's mother
- Mohnish Behl as Kaanti, Anand's friend and Hemant's elder brother
- Aasif Sheikh as Hemant, Kaanti's younger brother
- Dalip Tahil as Nath
- Bindu as Nath's wife
- Nawab Shah (actor) as Baba, Nath's son
- Neha Pendse as Guddi (Anand and Sunil's sister)
- Dina Pathak as Anand and Sunil's grandmother
- Alok Nath as Kapoor, Nisha's father
- Shama Deshpande as Nisha's mother
- Ali Asgar (actor) as Sunil's college friend
- Ravi Gossain as Ashok Khanna / Sunil, Sunil's college friend
- Rakesh Bedi as College Principal
- Navneet Nishan as Pratima, College Principal
- Shoma Anand as Vimla
- Veeru Krishnan as Hijra (Transgender)
- Shahnawaz Pradhan as Jeevan
- Dolly Bindra as Jeevan's wife
- Narayani Shastri as Vimala's daughter - Bride in marriage (Special appearance) in the song "Tere Galon Ki Chandni Dekhe"

== Music and soundtrack ==
The music of the film was composed by Jatin–Lalit and the lyrics of the songs were penned by Majrooh Sultanpuri.

Pyaar Koi Khel Nahin

Soundtrack album by Jatin–Lalit
- Released: 8 April 1999
- Genre: Feature film soundtrack
- Label: Music India Ltd

#	Title	Singer(s)
1	"Apni To Life Mein"	Asha Bhosle
2	"Kuch Hamare Hain"	Alka Yagnik, Udit Narayan
3	"Ladke Ne Ladki" ( Not in the Film)	Abhijeet Bhattacharya
4	"Nazar Milte Hi"	Alka Yagnik, Vinod Rathod
5	"Pyaar Koi Khel Nahin"	Kumar Sanu
6	"Pyaar Koi Khel Nahin (Sad)"	Kumar Sanu
7	"Tere Galon Ki"	Alka Yagnik, Udit Narayan
8	"Yaad Piya Ki"	Falguni Pathak
9	"Yaad Piya Ki" (Sad)	Falguni Pathak
10	"Chand Sa Lala Ma"	Pyasi, Dileep Kumar
