= Souten: The Other Woman =

- Movie poster
- Directed by: Karan Razdan
- Written by: Karan Razdan
- Starring: Mahima Chaudhry; Gulshan Grover; Shakti Kapoor; Padmini Kolhapure; Kiran Rathod; Vikram Singh
- Music by: Anand–Milind
- Release date: 24 March 2006
- Country: India
- Language: Hindi

Souten: The Other Woman is a 2006 Bollywood film written and directed by Karan Razdan, starring Gulshan Grover, Mahima Chaudhry, Vikram Singh, Kiran Rathod and Shakti Kapoor. The film was released on 24 March 2006.

== Cast ==
- Mahima Chaudhry as Mitali 'Mita' Singh
- Gulshan Grover as Ranbir Singh
- Kiran Rathod as Sapna Singh
- Vikram Singh as Rajvir Singh (Raj)
- Padmini Kohlapure as Smita Singh
- Shakti Kapoor as Sumer Singh
- Shiva Rindani as Sardar Singh

== Soundtrack ==
All songs composed by Anand–Milind with lyrics written by Praveen Bhardwaj.

- "Barsaat Hai" - Alka Yagnik, Udit Narayan
- "Kuch Dard" - Sunidhi Chauhan
- "Kuch Dard" (duet) - Sunidhi Chauhan, Abhijeet Bhattacharya
- "Mohabbat Ho Gayee" - Alka Yagnik, Sonu Nigam
- "Souten Souten" - Richa Sharma, Sunidhi Chauhan
- "Souten Souten" (version 2) - Richa Sharma, Sunidhi Chauhan
