= Rajani (TV series) =

- Written by: Mannu Bhandari
- Directed by: Basu Chatterjee
- Country of origin: India
- Original language: Hindi
- No. of seasons: 2
- No. of episodes: 26

Production
- Camera setup: Single camera
- Running time: 22 minutes

Original release
- Network: DD National
- Release: 1985

Rajani is an Indian television series which aired on Doordarshan directed by Basu Chatterjee. It had Priya Tendulkar in lead role. It became immensely popular for creating awareness among lax government offices and officials. Shah Rukh Khan and Subhash Ghai had cameo appearances in two episodes. It was written by Karan Razdan and Anil Chaudhary, with the title track being sung by Asha Bhosle.

== Premise ==
Rajani fights government laxity in every episode. It tried to reflect the mid-1980s state of services at government offices. Public utilities that were criticised in the series included electricians, postmen, telephone wiremen, and the gas cylinder agency with its delivery boys.

== Cast ==
- Priya Tendulkar as Rajani
- Karan Razdan as Rajani's husband
- Amar Upadhyay as Sahil
- Sheela Sharma as Shobhna
- Prashant Narayanan
- Rajeev Paul as Rakesh
- Vikram Gokhale as Commissioner
- Sayaji Shinde
- Shahrukh Khan and Subhash Ghai (guest appearances)
- Aruna Sangal as Sheela

== Production ==
=== Development ===
Rajani was developed by Basu Chatterjee after taking inspiration from the American TV series Here's Lucy, which featured a housewife who stumbled to overcome problems, most of which were caused by her own actions. The pilot episode was shot in 1984 with veteran movie actress Padmini Kolhapure, who later quit the series. After deciding upon Priya Tendulkar as the lead, Chatterjee modified the premise, making the title character a social activist who fought against the injustice in the system. Due to a small budget leading to unavailability of sets to shoot in, the series was shot at screenwriter Ranjan Bose's apartment. This had the added effect of lending the series a middle class and lived-in feeling. While Asha Bhosle sang the title track, Karan Razdan was chosen as the writer. The team was asked to stop production after 42 weeks and the completion of 13 episodes. Razdan and Tendulkar fell in love over the course of the production of the series.

=== Casting ===
Padmini Kolhapure was initially chosen to play the role of Rajani and even starred in the pilot episode. However, she later quit when faced with the "horror of an episode a week", because it meant "too much time and work". Moushumi Chatterjee and Amrita Singh were considered as replacements to fit into the image of the vivacious Lucy. Basu Chatterjee then ran into Priya Tendulkar at a party, and decided to modify the premise of the series to make the title character more suited to Tendulkar's strong demeanour. Karan Razdan, the writer of the show, played the role of Rajani's husband.

== Reception ==
The series very well received by the public, who could instantly connect with the issues discussed. The Indian Express published a full-page "Letters to the Editor" segment dedicated to all the praise that the series received. Priya Tendulkar was launched into popularity and won roles in series such as Anji, based on her father Vijay Tendulkar's play, and many advertisements. Basu Chatterjee, too, became popular, and managed two of the advertisements Tendulkar starred in. He was also given the opportunity to have another series, Darpan, on Doordarshan airing on the prime Sunday morning slot, back-to-back with Rajani. One TV rating chart in Bombay showed a viewership of about 94 per cent for the programme in July 1985.

However, the tackling of fictional issues in existing public departments led the Bombay-based All India LPG Distributors Federation and 500 taxi drivers to protest outside the Doordarshan office, in two separate incidents. The latter incident led to taxi drivers' business dropping by 10 per cent and was even commemorated by the Amul girl hoardings, featuring a butter-licking Rajani and a fleeing taxi with the query, "What's yellow on top and all for Rajani?".
