= Tarun Arora =

Indian model & actor

- Born: Assam, India
- Other name: Arora
- Occupations: Actor; model; producer
- Years active: 1998–2023
- Spouse: Anjala Zaveri

Tarun Arora is an Indian model, actor and producer who works in Hindi, Telugu and Tamil language films. He is known for winning Gladrags Manhunt title, and appearing in commercials like Raymond and for his roles in movies like Pyaar Mein Kabhi Kabhi and Jab We Met.

== Career ==
Tarun Arora began modelling while studying hotel management in Bangalore. He won the Gladrags Manhunt in 1998. He was later seen in advertisement campaigns for brands like Raymond, Westside, Kwality Walls, McDowell's whiskey, and LG, and walked the runway for several designers. He also appeared in the music video, Dil Chori, by Hans Raj Hans.

Arora filmed his first Bollywood role in 1999, in Pyaar Mein Kabhi Kabhi. He had his first major role in the film, Hawas (2004). Over the next three years, he performed in several low-budget films like Sheen (2004), 19 Revolutions (2004), Men Not Allowed (2006) and Ghuttan (2007). In 2007, he performed in the film, Jab We Met, in which he played the role of Kareena Kapoor's lover, who rejects her and comes back, only to get rejected himself. The film was a major hit at the box office. In 2009, he appeared in two films: 2 and Love Guru. He received praise for his role in the 2016 film, Kanithan, and he played the main antagonist in the Chiranjeevi starrer, Khaidi No. 150 (2017). Tarun made his Malayalam film debut with the period action film Mamangam in 2019 with the Diya Aur Baati Hum star Prachi Tehlan.

== Personal life ==
Arora is married to actress Anjala Zaveri.

== Filmography ==
| Year | Film | Role | Language |
|---|---|---|---|
| 1999 | Pyaar Mein Kabhi Kabhi | | Hindi |
| 2004 | Hawas | Karan | Hindi |
| 2004 | Sheen | Mannu | Hindi |
| 2004 | 19 Revolutions | Sanjay | English |
| 2006 | Men Not Allowed | Vikram | Hindi |
| 2006 | Hot Money | Rahul Kapoor | Hindi |
| 2006 | Ghuttan | Jaggi | Hindi |
| 2007 | Jab We Met | Anshuman Malhotra | Hindi |
| 2011 | Poley Poley Urey Mon | Amit Agarwal | Assamese |
| 2014 | Karar | Aaryan | Hindi |
| 2016 | Kanithan | Thura Sarkar | Tamil |
| 2016 | Kaththi Sandai | Tamizhselvan's accomplice | Tamil |
| 2017 | Khaidi No. 150 | Aggarwal | Telugu |
| 2017 | Katamarayudu | Errasani Bhanu | Telugu |
| 2017 | Jaya Janaki Nayaka | Arjun Pawar | Telugu |
| 2018 | Amar Akbar Anthony | Karan Arora | Telugu |
| 2019 | Kanchana 3 | Minister Shankar | Tamil |
| 2019 | Arjun Suravaram | Tura Sarkar | Telugu |
| 2019 | Mamangam | Zamar Koya | Malayalam |
| 2020 | Dagaalty | Vijay Samrat | Tamil |
| 2020 | Laxmii | MLA Girija | Hindi |
| 2021 | Seetimaarr | Makhan Singh | Telugu |
| 2023 | Kranti | Salatri | Kannada |
| 2023 | Agilan | Kapoor | Tamil |
| 2023 | Ramabanam | GK | Telugu |
| 2023 | Bhola Shankar | Alexander | Telugu |
