= Nadeem–Shravan =

Indian music composer duo

Nadeem Saifi Shravan Rathod

Background information
- Also known as: Nadeem–Shravan
- Genres: Soundtrack, Bollywood, filmi, filmi-ghazal, ghazal, romantic, Indian classical, Hindustani classical music
- Occupations: Music directors, composer, music producers, singers, instrumentalists
- Years active: 1977–2005, 2009, 2016–present
- Members: Shravan Rathod (until 22 April 2021); Nadeem Akhtar Saifi

Nadeem–Shravan is an Indian composer duo in the Bollywood film industry of India. They derive their name from the first names of Nadeem Akhtar Saifi (born 6 August 1954) and Shravan Kumar Rathod (13 November 1954 – 22 April 2021).

Nadeem–Shravan was one of the most successful Bollywood music directors of the 1990s until the early 2000s. They displayed a strong influence of Hindustani (classical / semi-classical) music in their compositions, and were the only composers during the 1990s and 2000s who relied heavily on three particular instruments: the bansuri, the sitar and the shehnai in almost all of their songs. By using these instruments in a modern way without disconnecting them from their original value, their contribution is unique compared to some rising music directors evolving a new music style beginning in the mid-1990s. They are considered one of the most successful and greatest music composers in Hindi cinema history.

Their breakthrough soundtrack album was Aashiqui (1990), which sold 20 million units in India, and became the best-selling Bollywood soundtrack album of all time. Nadeem–Shravan were also behind many of the other best-selling Bollywood soundtrack albums of the 1990s. Their success helped establish the music label T-Series. The duo's career temporarily came to a halt with the murder of T-Series founder Gulshan Kumar by Mumbai underworld syndicate D-Company, with Nadeem Akhtar Saifi initially accused of involvement, before later being exonerated. The duo eventually made a comeback in the 2000s.

Nadeem–Shravan composed soundtracks for many Hindi films, including Aashiqui (1990), Saajan (1991), Phool Aur Kaante (1991), Sadak (1991), Dil Hai Ke Manta Nahin (1991), Deewana (1992), Sapne Saajan Ke (1992), Hum Hain Rahi Pyar Ke (1993), Rang (1993), Damini (1993), Dilwale (1994), Aatish: Feel the Fire (1994), Salaami (1994), Raja (1995), Barsaat (1995), Agni Sakshi (1996), Jeet (1996), Raja Hindustani (1996), Saajan Chale Sasural (1996), Pardes (1997), Judaai (1997), Mohabbat (1997), Maharaja (1998), Sirf Tum (1999), Dhadkan (2000), Kasoor (2001), Ek Rishtaa (2001), Jeena Sirf Merre Liye (2002), Yeh Dil Aashiqanaa (2002), Raaz (2002), Dil Hai Tumhaara (2002), Haan Maine Bhi Pyaar Kiya (2002), Dil Ka Rishta (2003), Andaaz (2003), Qayamat (2003), Tumsa Nahi Dekha (2004) and Bewafaa (2005), Barsaat (2005), Dosti (2005) among others.

Their most commonly featured and favorite singers include "Trio" Kumar Sanu, Alka Yagnik, Udit Narayan but other Hindi playback singers like Anuradha Paudwal, Kavita Krishnamurthy, Sonu Nigam, Sadhana Sargam, Poornima, Jaspinder Narula, K. S. Chithra, S. P. Balasubrahmanyam, Hariharan, Suresh Wadkar, Pankaj Udhas, Mohammed Aziz, Sudesh Bhosle, Shailendra Singh, Shabbir Kumar, Nitin Mukesh, Roop Kumar Rathod, Vinod Rathod, Abhijeet, Shaan, Amit Kumar, KK, Gurdas Maan, Shankar Mahadevan, Babul Supriyo, Manhar Udhas, Bali Brahmbhatt, Jolly Mukherjee, Sapna Mukherjee, Alisha Chinoy, Anwar, Vijay Benedict, Sunanda, Sapna Awasthi, Sarika Kapoor and many others have sung under their baton. Veteran singer Mohammed Rafi also sang for them in their film Dangal and Kishore Kumar in the film Ilaaka. Singers Lata Mangeshkar and Asha Bhosle also sang in few albums for the duo.

== Music career ==
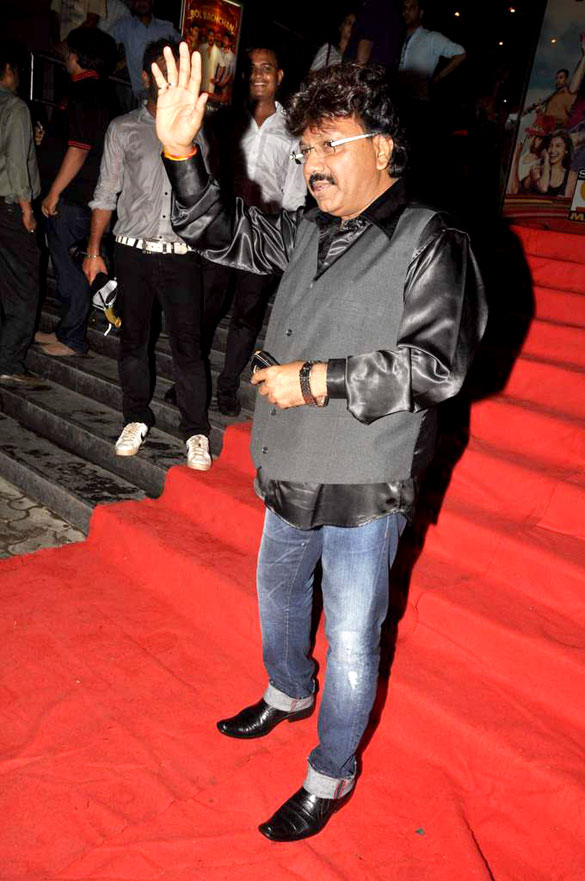
Shravan Kumar Rathod, one half of the Nadeem–Shravan duo, in 2012.

The association of Nadeem Akhtar Saifi and Shravan dates back to 1973 when they met each other at a function. Their first film assignment was Dangal, a Bhojpuri movie in 1973 (released in 1977) which featured the popular Bhojpuri song "Kashi hile, Patna hile" sung by Manna Dey. Their first Hindi movie assignment was Maine Jeena Seekh Liya in 1981 sung by Amit Kumar. In 1985, the duo composed music for a commercial project called Star Ten. Ten Hindi actors (Mithun, Jackie Shroff, Anil Kapoor, Sachin, Danny, Vijendra, Sulakshana Pandit, etc.) sang some songs with lyrics by Anwar Saagar.

=== Early success ===
Their breakthrough film, Aashiqui (1990), which brought them into the limelight, was gifted to them by none other than Gulshan Kumar. Aashiqui has been rated the 4th best soundtrack ever by PlanetBollywood.com on their "100 Greatest Bollywood Soundtracks". The soundtrack album sold 20 million units, making it the best-selling Bollywood soundtrack album of all time.

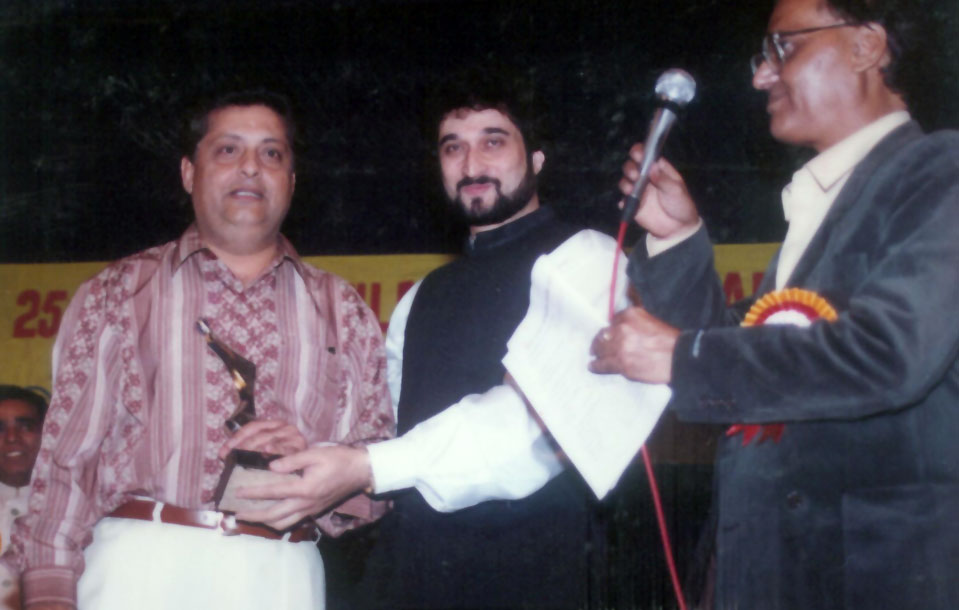
Nadeem Akhtar Saifi, other half of the Nadeem–Shravan duo, in 1996

Their success continued with Saajan, Dil Hai Ki Manta Nahin, Sadak, Sainik, Raja, Dilwale, Raja Hindustani and Phool Aur Kaante. Whether it was "Chehra Kya Dekhte Ho" (Salaami), "Adayein Bhi Hain" (Dil Hai Ke Manta Nahin), "Sochenge Tumhe Pyar" (Deewana), "Tujhe Na Dekhu Toh Chain" (Rang), "Dilbar" (Sirf Tum) and "Ek Baar To India" (Jeena Sirf Merre Liye) they all had the distinct stamp of Nadeem–Shravan.

Most of their compositions fall under the filmi-ghazal genre, as they were greatly inspired by ghazal music, and Music of Indian classical.

When Pardes soundtrack was released, the tracks had different varieties of songs; songs ("I Love My India" and "Meri Mehbooba"), love songs ("Do Dil Mil Rahe Hain") and qawwali ("Nahin Hona Tha") pop ("My first day in America"), pain ("Ye Dil Deewana"). PlanetBollywood.com started the review by saying, "The music for Pardes is Nadeem-Shravan's best ever."

They have worked with lyricists like Sameer, Anand Bakshi, Faaiz Anwar, Hasrat Jaipuri, Rani Malik and many others. When they arrived on the music scene, Laxmikant–Pyarelal and Anand–Milind were at the top. But subsequently their hard work paid off and they had various hits in a row.

=== Gulshan Kumar murder case ===
Gulshan Kumar, the owner of T-Series, was shot dead outside the Jeeteshwar Mahadev Mandir, a Hindu temple dedicated to Lord Shiva of which he attended daily in Jeet Nagar, Andheri West suburb of Mumbai, on 12 August 1997. Mumbai underworld organization D-Company was involved with the murder. The police also accused Nadeem Saifi of having paid for the murder due to a personal dispute and fled the country after the murder. According to the police, Nadeem hatched the conspiracy in Dubai in May with Anees Ibrahim Kaskar, the brother of fugitive gangster Dawood Ibrahim Kaskar and Dawood's associates Abu Salem and Kayyum. Crime branch sources said Nadeem has been out of Bombay since Gulshan Kumar died. During the interrogation of the arrested gangsters, the police reportedly learned that Nadeem had organized a "secret" music function in June for Dawood Ibrahim Kaskar in Dubai. Many well-known Bollywood personalities, the police claim, were present.

In 2001, the case was taken to the London High Court, which rejected the Indian government's request for extradition on the grounds that there was no prima facie case against Saifi. In August 2001, the prosecution's main witness, Mohammed Ali Hussain Shaikh, who had earlier claimed Saifi participated in the murder, eventually revealed that he didn't know Saifi and had never seen him. Abu Salem also denied Nadeem's involvement on Indian national television. Saifi was also exonerated by four courts, including the House of Lords in the United Kingdom and the sessions court in Mumbai. Saifi eventually acquired British citizenship, and later moved to Dubai, where he runs a successful perfumery business.

=== Later years ===
Despite long-distance collaboration from London, they continued producing hits into the early 2000s Dhadkan (2000), Kasoor (2001), Ek Rishtaa (2001), Yeh Dil Aashiqanaa (2002), Raaz (2002), Haan Maine Bhi Pyaar Kiya (2002), Hum Tumhare Hain Sanam (2002), Dil Hai Tumhaara (2002), Jeena Sirf Merre Liye (2002), Dil Ka Rishta (2003), Andaaz (2003), Qayamat (2003), Tumsa Nahin Dekha (2004), Bewafaa (2005), Barsaat (2005), and Dosti (2005). The duo split in 2005 but briefly reunited for Do Knot Disturb (2009).

Shravan was hospitalised in critical condition at the Hinduja Hospital in Mumbai after being diagnosed with COVID-19. He died on 23 April. His son and wife were admitted to another medical facility in the city.

== Discography ==
Year	Film	Notes
1977	Dangal	Bhojpuri film
1979	Mai Ka Lal	Bhojpuri film
1982	Apradhi Kaun?	
1982	Zakhmee Insaan	
1982	Maine Jeena Seekh Liya	
1982	Anmol Sitaare	
1982	Naya Safar	
1983	Sajai Da Maang Hamaar	Bhojpuri film
1983	Lohi Nu Tilak	
1985	Cheekh	
1986	Qatil Aur Ashiq	
1986	Vikram Betaal	
1987	Khooni Mahal	
1988	Zulm Ko Jala Doonga	
1989	Ilaaka	
1989	Hisaab Khoon Ka	
1989	Lashkar	
1990	Baap Numbri Beta Dus Numbri	
1990	Solah Satra	
1990	Aashiqui	Winner, Filmfare Award for Best Music Director
1990	Apmaan Ki Aag	
1991	Laal Paree	
1991	Jigarwala	
1991	Jaan Ki Kasam	
1991	Dil Hai Ke Manta Nahin	
1991	Saajan	Winner, Filmfare Award for Best Music Director
1991	Saathi	
1991	Phool Aur Kaante	Nominated, Filmfare Award for Best Music Director
1991	Pyaar Ka Saaya	
1991	Sadak	
1992	Dil Ka Kya Kasoor	
1992	Panaah	
1992	Jaan Tere Naam	
1992	Deewana	Winner, Filmfare Award for Best Music Director
1992	Paayal	
1992	Sapne Sajan Ke	
1992	Bekhudi	
1992	Kal Ki Awaz	
1992	Junoon	
1992	Dilwale Kabhi Na Hare	
1992	Anaam	
1993	Balmaa	
1993	Divya Shakti	
1993	Shreemaan Aashique	
1993	Damini	
1993	Sangraam	
1993	Krishan Avtaar	
1993	Waqt Hamara Hai	
1993	Rang	
1993	Hum Hain Rahi Pyar Ke	Nominated, Filmfare Award for Best Music Director
1993	Dhartiputra	
1993	Aadmi Khilona Hai	
1993	Sainik	
1993	Dil Tera Aashiq	
1993	Kaise Kaise Rishte	
1993	Tadipaar	
1993	Pyar Pyar	
1994	Dilwale	
1994	Salaami	
1994	Saajan Ka Ghar	
1994	Aatish: Feel the Fire	
1994	Ekka Raja Rani	
1994	Kranti Kshetra	
1994	Stuntman	
1994	Chhoti Bahoo	
1995	Andolan	
1995	Anokha Andaaz	
1995	Raja	Nominated, Filmfare Award for Best Music Director
1995	Gaddaar	
1995	Saajan Ki Baahon Mein	
1995	Zamaana Deewana	
1995	Barsaat	
1996	Majhdhaar	
1996	Agni Sakshi	
1996	Saajan Chale Sasural	
1996	Jung	
1996	Himmatvar	
1996	Jeet	
1996	Raja Hindustani	Winner, Filmfare Award for Best Music Director; Winner, Star Screen Award for Best Music Director
1997	Judaai	
1997	Jeevan Yudh	
1997	Pardes	Nominated, Filmfare Award for Best Music Director; Winner, Star Screen Award for Best Music Director
1997	Mohabbat	
1997	Naseeb	
1998	Saat Rang Ke Sapne	
1998	Maharaja	
1999	Aa Ab Laut Chalen	
1999	Sirf Tum	
2000	Dhadkan	Nominated, Filmfare Award for Best Music Director
2001	Kasoor	
2001	Ek Rishtaa: The Bond of Love	
2001	Hum Ho Gaye Aapke	
2002	Yeh Dil Aashiqanaa	
2002	Raaz	Nominated, Filmfare Award for Best Music Director; Winner, Zee Cine Award for Best Music Director
2002	Haan Maine Bhi Pyaar Kiya	
2002	Ansh: The Deadly Part	
2002	Tumse Achcha Kaun Hai	
2002	Hum Tumhare Hain Sanam	
2002	Dil Hai Tumhaara	
2002	Jeena Sirf Merre Liye	
2003	Zinda Dil	
2003	Dil Ka Rishta	
2003	Indian Babu	
2003	Yeh Dil	
2003	Andaaz	
2003	Qayamat: City Under Threat	
2003	Hungama	
2003	Footpath	
2003	Raja Bhaiya	
2004	Sheen	
2004	Tumsa Nahin Dekha: A Love Story	
2004	Hatya	
2005	Bewafaa	
2005	Barsaat	
2005	Dosti: Friends Forever	Last film before official split
2006	Mere Jeevan Saathi	
2008	Gumnaam – The Mystery	
2009	Sanam Teri Kasam	Previously released as Sambandh (1996)
2009	Do Knot Disturb	Comeback after their split in 2006
2016	Ishq Forever	Nadeem Saifi as a Solo Music Director
2017	Ek Haseena Thi Ek Deewana Tha	Nadeem Saifi as a Solo Music Director
2025	Andaaz 2	Nadeem Saifi first film after Shravan's demise

== Music albums ==
S.No	Year	Albums	Song(s)	Singer(s)	Lyricist(s)
1	1985	Star Ten	Bar Bar Telephone	Anil Kapoor, Vijayta Pandit	Anwar Sagar
1	1985	Star Ten	Kashmir Se Kaniya Kumari	Jackie Shroff	Anwar Sagar
1	1985	Star Ten	Yunh Dhoop Mein	Danny Denzongpa, Kalpana Iyer	Anwar Sagar
1	1985	Star Ten	Kal Bas Ke Intizar	Shailendra Singh	Anwar Sagar
1	1985	Star Ten	Aaj Ki Raat Na Ghar	Vijayendra Ghatge, Kaajal Kiran	Anwar Sagar
1	1985	Star Ten	Disco Ki Bimari Ayee	Sachin, Chorus	Anwar Sagar
1	1985	Star Ten	Angoori Paani Chhad Gaya	Mithun Chakraborty	Anwar Sagar
2	1991	Aap Ki Yaadein Vol 1	Aap Se Achhi Aap Ki Yaaden Hain	Kumar Sanu, Anuradha Paudwal, Debashish Das Gupta	Faaiz Anwar
2	1991	Aap Ki Yaadein Vol 1	Chahe Duniya, Chahe Toofan, Chahe Qayamat Aa Jaye	Anuradha Paudwal, Mohammed Aziz	Faaiz Anwar
2	1991	Aap Ki Yaadein Vol 1	Jo Pyar Kar Gaye	Kumar Sanu	Faaiz Anwar
2	1991	Aap Ki Yaadein Vol 1	Pal Din Mahine Kai Saal Ho Gaye	Anuradha Paudwal, Mohammed Aziz	Faaiz Anwar
3	1992	Rahbar	Waadiye Ishq Se	Alka Yagnik	Sayeed Rahi
3	1992	Rahbar	Chain Payega Kahan	Alka Yagnik	Madan Pal
3	1992	Rahbar	Yeh Koi Baat Nahin Hai	Alka Yagnik	Sayeed Rahi
3	1992	Rahbar	Apni Soorat Pe	Alka Yagnik	Hasrat Jaipuri
3	1992	Rahbar	Kiske Shaanon Pe	Alka Yagnik	Sayeed Rahi
3	1992	Rahbar	Dil Ka Bhola Hai	Alka Yagnik, Raj Kumar	Sayeed Rahi
3	1992	Rahbar	Tujhko Ghazal Kahoon	Raj Kumar	Anwar Sagar
3	1992	Rahbar	Dekhkar Jinko	Raj Kumar	Anwar Sagar
3	1992	Rahbar	Mera Khat Milte Hi	Raj Kumar	Madan Pal
3	1992	Rahbar	Aap Jitni Berukhi Se	Raj Kumar	Maya Govind
3	1992	Rahbar	Abhi Bhi Waqt Hai	Raj Kumar	Anwar Sagar
4	1994	Sayesha	Jab Koi Pyar Se Bulayega	Nadeem Saifi, Alka Yagnik	Sameer
4	1994	Sayesha	Khuda Aap Ko Nazar	Nadeem Saifi, Alka Yagnik	Nadeem Saifi/Sameer
4	1994	Sayesha	Pyar Hua Hai Abhi	Nadeem Saifi, Alka Yagnik	Sameer
4	1994	Sayesha	Dekha Tujhe To	Nadeem Saifi, Alka Yagnik	Sameer
4	1994	Sayesha	Itna Bhi Na Chaho	Nadeem Saifi	Sameer
4	1994	Sayesha	Sayesha Sayesha	Nadeem Saifi	Sameer
4	1994	Sayesha	Sunder Haath	Nadeem Saifi	
4	1994	Sayesha	Sayesha Sayesha	Nadeem Shravan	Sameer
5	1995	Teri Mohabbat Mein	Ae Sanam Tum Hi	Kumar Sanu	Nafees Alam
5	1995	Teri Mohabbat Mein	Bhula Chuka Hoon Zamana	Kumar Sanu	Nafees Alam
5	1995	Teri Mohabbat Mein	Dil De Chuke Hain	Kumar Sanu	Nafees Alam
5	1995	Teri Mohabbat Mein	Raatein Hain Iqrar Ki	Kumar Sanu	Nafees Alam
5	1995	Teri Mohabbat Mein	Teri Judaai Mein	Kumar Sanu	Nafees Alam
5	1995	Teri Mohabbat Mein	Tum Jab Bhi Khat	Kumar Sanu	Nafees Alam
5	1995	Teri Mohabbat Mein	Yeh Baharein Yeh Nazarein	Kumar Sanu	Nafees Alam
5	1995	Teri Mohabbat Mein	Padh Kar Tumhara Khat	Sadhana Sargam	Nafees Alam
6	1995	Nadeem Sings All Time Hits – Dance Remix	O Mere Dil Ke Chain	Nadeem Saifi, Priya Bhattacharya	Majrooh Sultanpuri
6	1995	Nadeem Sings All Time Hits – Dance Remix	Dum Dum Diga Diga	Nadeem Saifi, Priya Bhattacharya	Qamar Jalalabadi
6	1995	Nadeem Sings All Time Hits – Dance Remix	Honthon Pe Sachchai Rahti Hai	Nadeem Saifi, Priya Bhattacharya	Shailendra
6	1995	Nadeem Sings All Time Hits – Dance Remix	Chura Liya Hai Tumne	Nadeem Saifi, Priya Bhattacharya	Majrooh Sultanpuri
6	1995	Nadeem Sings All Time Hits – Dance Remix	Dheere Dheere Se	Nadeem Saifi, Priya Bhattacharya	Rani Malik
6	1995	Nadeem Sings All Time Hits – Dance Remix	Mera Dil Tere Liye	Nadeem Saifi, Priya Bhattacharya	Sameer
6	1995	Nadeem Sings All Time Hits – Dance Remix	Jaane Jigar Jaaneman	Nadeem Saifi, Priya Bhattacharya	Sameer
6	1995	Nadeem Sings All Time Hits – Dance Remix	Nazar Ke Saamne	Nadeem Saifi, Priya Bhattacharya	Sameer
7	1996	Sajni	Woh Jab Aaina Dekhte Honge	Suchandra	Sameer
7	1996	Sajni	Tum Jab Aaina Dekhti Hogi	Vinod Rathod	Sameer
7	1996	Sajni	Tujhko Main Tujhse Churaunga		Sameer
7	1996	Sajni	Paas Reh Kar Bhi Koi Paas Na Ho	Kavita Krishnamurthy	Sameer
7	1996	Sajni	O Jaane Jaan	Sunidhi Chauhan	Sameer
7	1996	Sajni	Dil Mein Tum Dhadkan	Kumar Sanu, Suchandra	Sameer
7	1996	Sajni	Chupke Se Wahin Milte Hain	Suchandra, Udit Narayan	Sameer
7	1996	Sajni	Baja Bajega To	Suchandra	Sameer
7	1996	Sajni	Ek Chehra Hai Jise Pyar	Suchandra	Sameer
7	1996	Sajni	Aye Dil Ye Baten	Sonu Nigam, Suchandra	Sameer
8	1997	Hi ! Ajnabi	Hi ! Ajnabi	Nadeem Saif	Sameer
8	1997	Hi ! Ajnabi	Hothon Mein Tupatte Ko Daba Lete	Nadeem Saif	Sameer
8	1997	Hi ! Ajnabi	Tumse Mila Tha College Mein	Nadeem Saif	Sameer
8	1997	Hi ! Ajnabi	Banalo Usko Tum Apna	Nadeem Saif	Sameer
8	1997	Hi ! Ajnabi	Pyar Bhi Ho Jayega	Nadeem Saif	Sameer
8	1997	Hi ! Ajnabi	Mujhse Mera Naam To Poochho	Nadeem Saif	Sameer
8	1997	Hi ! Ajnabi	Tum Se Mili Thi College Mein	Alka Yagnik	Sameer
8	1997	Hi ! Ajnabi	Nazar Milake Baat Karo	Nadeem Saifi, Sadhana Sargam	Sameer
8	1997	Hi ! Ajnabi	Meri Tamanna Hai Main Amitabh	Nadeem Saifi, Alka Yagnik	Sameer
9	2012	Rang	Ye Meri Dua Mein Asar Aaye	Abhijeet Bhattacharya	Sameer
9	2012	Rang	Aaye Ho Abhi	Abhijeet Bhattacharya, Sarika Kapoor	Sameer
9	2012	Rang	Ye To Mumkin Hi Nahin	Babul Supriyo	Sameer
9	2012	Rang	Khuda Ki Kasam	Udit Narayan, Shreya Ghoshal	Sameer
9	2012	Rang	Hum The Tum The	Sonu Nigam	Sameer
9	2012	Rang	Hawa Ne Ye Paigham	Alka Yagnik	Sameer
9	2012	Rang	Ishq Na Mange	Sonu Nigam, Jaspinder Narula	Sameer

== Single(s) ==
Year	Title	Lyricist	Singers	Actors	Label	Notes
2022	Jahan Base Dil	Sameer Anjaan	Raj Barman	Shivin Narang & Eisha Singh	Zee Music Company	Nadeem's first ever single
2023	Main Aapke Seene Mein	Sameer Anjaan	Kumar Sanu	Kumar Sanu	Venus Worldwide Entertainment	Recorded previously in 1993

== Accolades ==
Year	Award	Movie	Director	Producer
1991	Filmfare Award for Best Music Director	Aashiqui	Mahesh Bhatt	Gulshan Kumar & Vishesh Films
1992	Filmfare Award for Best Music Director	Saajan	Lawrence D'Souza	Sudhakar Bokade
1993	Filmfare Award for Best Music Director	Deewana	Raj Kanwar	Guddu Dhanoa
1997	Filmfare Award for Best Music Director & Screen Award for Best Music Director	Raja Hindustani	Dharmesh Darshan	Tips Films, Ali Morani, Karim Morani, Bunty Soorma
1998	Screen Award for Best Music Director	Pardes	Subhash Ghai	Subhash Ghai
2003	Zee Cine Award for Best Music Director	Raaz	Vikram Bhatt	Mukesh Bhatt, Kumar S. Taurani, Ramesh S. Taurani

== Impact on record sales ==
In total span of 16 years only 5 years (1994, 1998, 1999, 2002, 2005) are such which don't have Nadeem–Shravan album in top 3. The yearly analysis is as follows:

Year	Rank (in terms of sales in India)
1990	1 – Aashiqui
1991	1 – Saajan 2 – Phool Aur Kaante 3 – Sadak
1992	1 – Deewana
1993	1 – Dilwale
1995	2 – Raja
1996	1 – Raja Hindustani 3 – Agni Sakshi
1997	2 – Pardes
2000	2 – Dhadkan
2001	3 – Raaz
2003	2 – Andaaz
2004	2 – Bewafaa

== Soundtrack album sales ==
The following table lists the sales of Nadeem–Shravan's top-selling Bollywood music soundtrack albums in India.

Film soundtrack	Year	Sales	Annual rank	Source(s)
Aashiqui	1990	20,000,000	1	
Raja Hindustani	1996	11,000,000	1	
Saajan	1991	7,000,000	1	
Phool Aur Kaante	1991	6,000,000	2	
Pardes	1997	6,000,000	2	
Dilwale	1993	5,500,000	1	
Sadak	1991	5,000,000	3	
Deewana	1992	4,500,000	1	
Dhadkan	2000	4,500,000	2	
Raja	1995	3,500,000	2	
Barsaat	1995	3,000,000	4	
Raaz	2001	3,000,000	3	
Agni Sakshi	1996	2,800,000	3	
Aatish	1994	2,500,000	10	
Saajan Chale Sasural	1996	2,500,000	5	
Bewafaa	2004	2,500,000	2	
Andaaz	2003	2,500,000	2	
Jeet	1996	2,500,000	4	
Dil Hai Ke Manta Nahin	1991	2,500,000	5	
Hum Hain Rahi Pyar Ke	1993	2,500,000	5	
Salaami	1993	2,200,000	10	
Sirf Tum	1999	2,200,000	9	
Qayamat	2003	2,100,000	5	
Sapne Saajan Ke	1992	2,000,000	8	
Rang	1993	2,000,000	13	
Judaai	1996	2,000,000	10	
Mohabbat	1997	2,000,000	11	
Ek Rishtaa	2001	1,800,000	10	
Haan Maine Bhi Pyaar Kiya	2001	1,800,000	11	
Yeh Dil Aashiqanaa	2001	1,600,000	12	
Hum Tumhare Hain Sanam	2002	1,600,000	5	
Dil Hai Tumhaara	2002	1,500,000	6	
Barsaat	2005	1,500,000	9	
Dil Ka Rishta	2002	1,400,000	8	
Dosti	2005	1,400,000	11	
Known album sales	—N/a	126,400,000	—N/a	

== See also ==
- List of Indian film music directors
