= Gumnaam – The Mystery =

2008 Indian Hindi thriller film

- Poster of the film
- Directed by: Neeraj Pathak
- Written by: Neeraj Pathak
- Produced by: Shubir Mukherjee
- Starring: Mahima Chaudhry; Dino Morea; Suman Ranganathan; Irrfan Khan
- Music by: Nadeem-Shravan
- Distributed by: Sony Music
- Release date: 5 December 2008
- Running time: 137 minutes
- Country: India
- Language: Hindi
- Box office: ₹55 lakh

Gumnaam – The Mystery is a 2008 Indian Hindi-language thriller film written and directed by Neeraj Pathak starring Dino Morea and Mahima Chaudhry.

== Plot ==
Gumnaam – The Mystery starts with an unknown lady driving on a rainy night, who is eventually murdered as she drives, and her finger is cut off.

The story then pivots to one of an aspiring actress, Ria, who models and acts in music videos. She has her eyes set on making it big in films as a lead actress. During one of her shoots, she meets Dev, a stuntman who saves her life during an accident on the set. She's impressed with him; soon love blossoms between them, and they are on a romantic high. Meanwhile, Ria is offered a lead role in a film by casting director Rishi Gandhi on the condition that she leaves for Shimla the next day. Dev is very happy about her getting the role and sees her off, wishing her all the luck.

On reaching the film director's mansion in Shimla, she is introduced to the film's director, Muni Gandhi, who praises her beauty and appreciates his assistant's perfect choice of casting her as the heroine. Slowly, Ria begins to see some unusual things around her. The director asks her to give a screen test; however, when she asks for a second take, she is refused. His assistant Rishi Gandhi delivers the cassette to Remon, a rich woman in a huge mansion in Shimla; the reason why he did so is not explained. Thereafter, Ria is not allowed to leave the mansion and is also not allowed to make phone calls. She notices that she is being spied upon by the casting director Rishi in her bedroom through a mask. Ria later explores the cellars of the mansion and, to her horror, finds the dead body of the unknown lady resembling her in a coffin. Her suspicions of the entire setup start building up.

The next day, when she wakes up, she sees that her hair has been cut and her finger has been removed, exactly like the dead woman in the cellar. Upon confronting the Gandhis, she realises that she is to be used as a pawn of extortion from Remon.

The rest of this thrilling drama unfolds, with Remon's role in the thriller being explained. Dev also becomes involved when he arrives in Shimla to look for Ria. The involvement of a rich uncle and his eventual murder by Remon further complicates the plot. Eventually, Remon and the Gandhis are brought to justice.

== Cast ==
- Dino Morea as Dev
- Mahima Chaudhry as Riya / Semon Singh
- Suman Ranganathan as Remon Singh
- Rakhi Sawant as Riya's friend
- Govind Namdeo as Muni Gandhi
- Madan Jain as Rishi Gandhi

== Soundtrack ==
The soundtrack was composed by Nadeem Shravan. Lyrics were penned by Sameer. “Mohabbat Se Zyada Mohabbat Hai Tumse” stands out as a fan favorite soulful duet.

#	Title	Singer(ed
1	"Dhoke Mein"	Alka Yagnik, Abhijeet, Sarika Kapoor
2	"Ishq Ne Kitna"	Adnan Sami, Shreya Ghoshal
3	"Mohabbat Hai Tumse"	Udit Narayan, Monica Nath
4	"Mohabbat Se Zyada"	Udit Narayan, Shreya Ghoshal
5	"Naa Hone Denge"	Alka Yagnik, Kumar Sanu
6	"Zaalim Ishq"	Sunidhi Chauhan, Shaan
