= Tehkikaat =

Indian crime drama

- Genre: Crime drama
- Directed by: Vijay Anand; Shekhar Kapur; Karan Razdan
- Starring: Vijay Anand; Saurabh Shukla
- Country of origin: India
- Original language: Hindi
- No. of seasons: 1
- No. of episodes: 52

Production
- Producer: Karan Razdan
- Cinematography: Pankaj Prakash
- Running time: 52 minutes

Original release
- Network: DD National
- Release: 1994 – 1995

Tehkikaat (transl. Investigation) is a Hindi language crime drama series written, produced and co-directed by Karan Razdan, along with Shekhar Kapur, starring Vijay Anand as Sam D'Silva and Saurabh Shukla as Gopichand.

The serial was broadcast on DD National (DD1) in the year 1994.

During the title track, Vijay Anand, portraying the role of Sam D'Silva, declares, 'Ham yahan tehkikaat karne aaye hain' ('We have come here to investigate'), setting the tone and introducing the crime series.

== Main cast ==
- Vijay Anand as Sam D'Silva
- Saurabh Shukla as Gopichand
- Suresh Chatwal as Bhinde
- Ashok Banthia as Chaudhary

== List of episodes ==
Episode Nos	Story	Cast	Theme
1,2,3	Jealously Turns Blood	Amita Nangia, Kitu Gidwani, Raj Zutshi, Prithvi Zutshi, Suhas Joshi, Shreechand Makhija, Dina Pathak, Girish Malik, Vijay Ganju, Suresh Chatwal	The episode opens with a lively masked New Year's Eve party where guests dance and celebrate into the night. Amid the festivities, a young woman slips away to her room. Sometimes later, a little girl discovers her stabbed and dying. The victim whispers a few final words before taking her last breath. With every guest a potential suspect and identities concealed behind masks, appearance prove deceptive. The investigators must unravel the truth behind a murder hidden behind masks. Who is the killer?
4,5	Green Park	Divya Seth, Harsh Chhaya, Parmeet Sethi, Sudhir Pandey, Sulabha Deshpande	The son of a wealthy man drives home in his car. Wounded, he reaches his house but dies inside the vehicle. He was soon to marry a girl from a poor family. The grieving father enlists Sam D'Silva's help. As the investigation unfolds, the girl's father attributes the tragedy to her fate, claiming that she is a Manglik and that misfortune befalls those destined to marry her. Was the young man the victim of a calculated murder, or is there some truth behind the ominous beliefs surrounding the bride-to-be?
6,7	Revenge Of Forgotten Past	Natasha Sinha, Rituraj Singh, Jaya Mathur, Ahmed Khan, Navtej Hundal, R.S.Chopra	Forced to stay at a hotel due to a roadblock, the guests stage a mock courtroom drama to kill boredom. But what begins as harmless playacting unexpectedly unravels into the discovery of an old murder. What seemed like entertainment now turns into a chilling investigation.
8,9	Travel Agency Girl Serial Killer	Pallavi Joshi, Poonam Dasgupta, Prithvi	One by one, women are murdered under mysterious circumstances. As the investigation unfolds, it is discovered that all the victims were former secretaries of a prominent businessman. With motive and opportunity seemingly pointing in his direction, he quickly becomes the prime suspect. Is the businessman really the murderer?
10,11	Twins Illusion	Karan Razdan (Dual Role), Natasha Rana, Shammi, Pinky Singh	Story of twin brothers, one a gentleman, the other seemingly wicked. When the latter becomes prime suspect in multiple murders, the truth seems obvious. But an unexpected twist in the investigation redefines the very meaning of virtue and wickednes.
12,13	Terror Attack Conspiracy	Pradeep Rawat, Prem Lala	During a train journey, Sam D'Silva and Gopi strike up a conversation with a co-passenger who appears to be a philosopher, a generous soul, and a numerologist. He offers guidance and assistance to other passengers who come and go. When Sam pieces together the conversations, he stumbles upon a deadly conspiracy involving terrorism and murder.
14,15	Miscreants Youth and a Road Accident	Daya Shankar Pandey, Ravi Gossain	A speeding car tears through the night. Inside, the occupants are engrossed in loud music, laughter, conversation, and drinking. A pedestrian steps into its path and is fatally struck. The victim's elderly parents turn to the police but got little help. The grieving couple seeks Sam D'Silva's help. The hit-and-run case appears impossible to crack. Sam must piece together the truth from the smallest of clues. Can he identify the person behind the wheel and bring the culprit to justice?
16,17	The Mystery Behind the Missing Girl	Bhavna Balsavar, Pramod Moutho, Kapil Kumar	A man's wife suddenly disappears without a trace. The situation appears grim for the husband, who while intoxicated, had repeatedly threatened to kill her. Following her disappearance, her mother files a police complaint, and the husband is arrested. He faces the possibility of severe punishment. He turns to Sam D'Silva and Gopi for help. Is the husband truly an innocent man trapped by circumstances, or is he cleverly feigning innocence and deceiving Sam as a last attempt to escape justice?
18,19,20	Mystery behind Suicide of an Actress	Rakhee Vijan, Supriya Karnik, Alyy Khan, Anil Kocchar	A film shoot is in progress when a close friend of the heroine arrives on the set. As the actress walks towards her, a massive studio light suddenly crashes down from above. She narrowly escapes death, thanks to the quick actions of a crew member. The danger does not end there. During the filming of a police station scene, a revolver that is supposed to be loaded with dummy cartridge is found to contain live ammunition. A shot is fired at actress, but the bullet misses its marks, and she escapes unharmed once again. Two apparent murder attempts fail. Then, in a shocking turn of events, the actress is reported to have committed suicide by jumping from the fifth floor of a building. Were the earlier incidents merely accidents and the death a genuine suicide?
21,22,23	Mystery Behind Sleepwalking Disorder	Ashutosh Rana, Sheela David, Jatin Sial, Shrishti Karnik	A housewife in a state of sleepwalking, kills two people, one at a beach and another in her own home. Her fingerprints on the knife lead to her arrest, making it appear to be an open and shut case. Yet, is the truth really so simple, or does it demand deeper investigation?
24,25,26	Supari-A Contract Killing	K. D. Chandran, Kanti Madia, Kanika Shivpuri, Ashok Laath, Rupa Bede	A wrong number changes everything. When Sam D'Silva accidentally receives a call meant for a contract killer, he desperately tries to prevent a murder. He fails. The victim is killed exactly as foretold. Yet a perplexing question remains: if the call reached Sam instead of the hitman, then who carried out the murder? And was the call really a mistake or part of a far more sinister plan?
27,28,29	The Dowry Case	Shubha Khote, Suchitra Bandekar, Anil Verma	A woman dies in a hotel room fire while waiting for her husband during their regular weekend retreat. The police close the case as suicide. She was deeply loved by her husband and in-laws and appeared to have no reason to take her own life. Her husband and in-laws turn to Sam D'Silva for answers. Was it really suicide, or has a killer managed to hide behind the flames.
30,31	The Result of Doubt	Arun Mathur, Ashalata Wabgaonkar, Anoop Soni, Manish Garg	A man rowing his boat discovers a dead body floating in the water. The victim is identified as a cheerful and amiable bachelor who shared a close friendship with three married couples and spent much of his time in their company. As investigations delve into his personal life, they uncover another side of the victim: he was romantically involved with three different women, all of whom become prime suspects. With friendship, love, jealousy, and hidden secret clouding the case, Sam D'Silva must uncover the truth. But which of the suspects had a motive strong enough to commit murder.
32,33,34	A Lucky Draw, Murder After Lucky Draw	Ashok Kumar, Subbiraj, Sudhir, Neelam Mehra, Asha Sharma, Aruna Sangal, Tina Ghai, Dinesh Kaushik	An elderly man gathers his relatives and friends including Sam D'Silva and Gopi. Convinced that he is terminally ill, he distributes his wealth through a lucky draw. Just then his doctor arrives and informs that all the tests are normal, and he is likely to live for another four to five years. The announcement leaves the beneficiaries disappointed. Sensing danger with whisper discussions and veiled hints about hastening the old man's demise, Sam warns him to be cautious. Soon thereafter, a murder shatters the gathering. Sam and Gopi begin their investigation.
35,36	Murder in a Swimming Pool	Milind Gawali, Sudha Chandran, Abbas Hirapurwala, Suresh Chatwal	A rich man strikes up a conversation with a debt-ridden bachelor in a bar. The bachelor insists that all women are unfaithful, claiming that they love one man but marry another. The rich man disagrees. The bachelor issues a challenge that he would prove that the rich man's wife can be tempted into infidelity. The rich man accepts the wager, and the bachelor is introduced into the household. As days pass, circumstances begin to suggest that the wife may not be as faithful as her husband believed. Then tragedy strikes, the woman is found dead in the Swimming Pool. Was she the victim of betrayal, jealousy, or a carefully planned conspiracy?
37,38,39	Murder By Sales Girls	Rasik Dave, Neelam Sagar, Anita Kulkarni, Suresh Chatwal	A housewife is murdered by a woman posing as sales representative. Denied entry at first, the salesgirl gains the victim's trust by offering a free packet of detergent powder and a product demonstration. Once inside the house, she kills the unsuspecting woman and escapes with valuable possessions. The culprit is known to be salesgirl, but identifying and tracing her proves far more difficult. Then the shocking incident repeats itself, not once but repeatedly with the same modus operandi, spreading fear and panic throughout the city. Are these crimes merely a series of robberies and murders, or is the salesgirl part of a far more sinister plan?
40,41	Murder in a Party	Naresh Suri, Virendra Singh, Aruna Sangal, Suresh Chatwal	A woman receives a mysterious phone call punctuated by a strange female laugh. The call sparks a bitter argument between her and her husband. While the wife accuses him of infidelity, he blames her arrogance and ambition, claiming that she has made many enemies. As the confrontation unfolds, a family secret comes to light: the husband's father had bequeathed his entire wealth and business empire to his daughter-in-law, bypassing his own son. The marriage already strained, appears to be on the verge of collapse. Soon afterward, a party is held. In full view of the guests, the husband openly flirts with another woman, humiliating his wife. Distressed and upset, she leaves the gathering and goes upstairs. Moment later, she is found murdered. With a trouble marriage, a disputed inheritance and a husband who appears to have both motive and opportunity, suspicion naturally falls on him. Sam D'Silva must uncover whether the obvious suspect is truly guilty or the real killer is hiding among the guests.
42,43	Case of Mysterious bank Frauds	Dharmesh Tiwari, Vijayan Nair, Suresh Chatwal	The arrival of a postman brings joyful news. The groom-side has given its consent and preparations for the wedding begins in full swing. To safeguard the family's valuables, jewelry and cash are deposited in a bank locker. Soon the family's happiness turns to shock when they discover that the locker has been emptied and the money withdrawn. Suspicion immediately falls on a neighbor who often accompanied the head of the family to the bank. However, when the neighbor is compelled to open his own locker, a startling truth emerges, he too has been defrauded, and his locker has been completely emptied. With the prime suspect now a victim himself, and the wedding only two days away, can Sam D'Silva uncover the culprit and recover the stole wealth before the wedding day arrives?
44,45	Murder Heists, Kidnapping and one Mastermind	Sandeep Kulkarni, Suresh Chatwal	A woman is murdered, and suspicion falls on a local goon who had recently quarrelled with her husband. The goon is arrested. Soon afterwards, a priceless ornament Naulakha Haar is stolen from a Wealthy household, and a suspect is promptly taken into custody. Then a man is found murdered, and his own brother is arrested. Each case seems straightforward, with the culprit identified almost immediately. Amid these seemingly open and shut cases, a little girl is kidnapped for ransom. The money is paid, and the girl is eventually rescued. Once again, the matter appears resolved without much difficulty. But can so many complex crimes really be solved so easily? Are the arrested individuals truly guilty or is someone manipulating events from behind the scenes.
46,47	Sleep Talking Disorder and Murder	Seema Kelkar, Vilas Kalgutkar, Iqbal Azad, Suresh Chatwal	A woman has an unusual habit; she talks in her sleep. Her husband often listens to her and learns what is on her mind. One evening, the couple hosts a party attended by friends and acquaintances. After the guests depart and the house falls silent, the woman begins talking in her sleep. She appears to be speaking to a man by name. She pleads with him to stop pursuing her, insisting that she loves her husband and can no longer deceive him. The enraged husband reaches for his pistol and drives to confront the supposed lover. But before he can settle the matter, he is found dead. The case seems simple, but is the truth really what it appears to be?
48,49,50	The Ghost of John Perriera	Pankaj Berry, Navni Parihar, Vinod Kapoor, Vijay Aidasani, Suresh Chatwal	Following a bitter dispute between the families of two brothers, the younger brother moves into a new house that he has purchases at a remarkably low price. One day, while his wife is home alone, a woman claiming to be a neighbor visits her and reveals that the house had remained unoccupied for the past three years after a man named John Perriera was brutally murdered there. She produces an old newspaper carrying details of the crime along with a photograph of the victim. Soon afterwards the housewife begins to see the ghostly apparition of John Perriera, while a chair in the kitchen appears to move on its own. Her husband seeks Sam D'Silva's help. As the sightings become more frequent, her fear grows into obsession. With each passing day, the alleged paranormal activities intensify, pushing the woman to the brink of a mental breakdown. Is the house truly haunted, or is someone deliberately staging the supernatural occurrences for a more sinister purpose?
51,52	Murder of Sam D'Silva	Pramod Moutho, Rasik Dave, Alyy Khan, Suresh Chatwal	A powerful bomb blast rocks a prison allowing several dangerous inmates to escape. While inspecting the damaged jail, Inspector Bhinde makes a disturbing discovery: Sam D'Silva's name has been scrawled repeatedly on the prison walls. Realizing that the escaped convicts may be plotting revenge, he senses that Sam's life is in grave danger and rushes to warn him. Meanwhile Sam D'Silva and Gopichand are being honored at a public function, where they recount some of their most memorable investigations before an appreciative audience. The celebration is abruptly shattered when Sam is shot multiple times and collapses onto a bench before the horrified crowd. The detective who solved countless mysteries now become the center of one. Who tried to kill Sam? Will the attacker be identified and brought to justice?
