= Karan Razdan =

Indian actor, writer and director (born 1961)

- Born: 25 April 1961 (age 65); India
- Occupations: Director, producer, and actor
- Spouses: Priya Tendulkar (m. 1988; sep. 1995); Arti Razdan (m. 2002)

Karan Razdan (born 25 April 1961) is an Indian actor, writer and director, who works in Bollywood.

== Career ==
He began his writing career with an unforgettable television show named ‘’Rajni’’ and then wrote produced and made his debut as director with a hit television show, Tehkikaat. He is famous for writing hit films like Dilwale, Diljale, Deewane, and Qayamat (script consultant). He has written and directed some films with controversial themes like Girlfriend (2004), Hawas (2004), Souten: The Other Woman, and Mittal vs Mittal. Umar (2006) is an emotional film about retired Indian old men in England. He has written and directed Mr. Bhatti on Chutti, a comedy. Presently he has completed a film named Hindutva.

He also wrote and acted in the hit TV series of mid 80s, Rajani and he has written produced and directed the detective TV serial Tehkikaat starring Vijay Anand and Saurabh Shukla

== Personal life ==
Karan Razdan is a Kashmiri Pandit. He married actress and social activist, Priya Tendulkar in 1988, and the couple separated in 1995. He married Arti Bhatti in 2002, who is now known as Arti Razdan.

== Filmography ==
=== Director ===
- Rajani TV series 1985
- Tehkikaat TV series (1994)
- Kisse Miyan Biwi Ke TV series (1990)
- Mr. Bhatti on Chutti (2012)
- Mittal v/s Mittal (2010)
- Eight - Shani (2006)
- Souten: The Other Woman (2006)
- Umar (2006)
- Girlfriend (2004)
- Hawas (2004)
- Eena Meena Deeka TV series
- Hindutva Chapter One - Main Hindu Hoon (2022)
- Hindutva Chapter Two - Hindu Jaag Utha (TBA)

=== As actor ===
- Shakti (1982) – News Reporter
- Disco Dancer (1982) – Sam Oberoi
- Jeevan Dhaara (1982) – Bus Conductor
- Tum Laut Aao (1983)
- Zara Si Zindagi (1983) – Amit
- Kasam Paida Karne Wale Ki (1984) – Chandrabhan

=== Screenplay ===
- Laxman Rekha (1991)
- Dilwale (1994)
- Trimurti (1995)
- Dushmani: A Violent Love Story (1995)
- Diljale (1996)
- Deewane (2000)
- Love Story 2050 (2008)
