= Hawas (2004 film) =

- Directed by: Karan Razdan
- Starring: Meghna Naidu; Shawar Ali; Tarun Arora
- Cinematography: C. Rajendra Prasad
- Music by: Daboo Malik
- Release date: 26 March 2004
- Country: India
- Language: Hindi

Hawas ("Lust") is an Indian Hindi erotic thriller film released in 2004. It is an adaptation of the 2002 American film Unfaithful. Hawas is directed by Karan Razdan and stars Meghna Naidu, Shawar Ali and Tarun Arora.

== Cast ==
- Shawar Ali as Raj Mittal
- Tarun Arora as Karan Rastogi
- Meghna Naidu as Sapna Raj Mittal Chinaal
- Mukesh Tiwari as Dubai Police inspector Rashid
- Vivek Shauq as assan, Assistant of Inspector Rashid
- Madina as Arabian actress in guest role in item song "Amma Mia"
- Noora as Arabian actress in guest role in item song "Amma Mia"

== Music ==
Lyrics for all songs written by Praveen Bhardwaj.

1. "Teri Chahat Me" (Male) - Babul Supriyo
2. "Tera Libaas" (II) - Sonu Nigam, Shreya Ghoshal
3. "Teri Chahat Me" (Female) - Sunidhi Chauhan
4. "Alla Miya" -[Sunidhi Chauhan, Daboo Malik
5. "Churaya Hai Teri Nazar" - Shreya Ghoshal, Babul Supriyo
6. "Tera Libaas Ban Jaau" - Shreya Ghoshal, Babul Supriyo

== Critical reception ==
Taran Adarsh of IndiaFM gave the film 2 stars out of 5, writing, "On the whole, HAWAS is a notch above the ordinary. And with sex, sleaze and skin-show as its trump cards, besides a mass appealing title, it has chances of scoring well at the ticket window, mainly at the small centers." Rama Sharma of The Tribune (Chandigarh) wrote, " 'Hawas' is another film riding on the wave of sexual permissiveness. It is another matter that these themes are not handled with sensitivity. In the absence of good scripts, most of these like 'Hawas' end up mocking at the man-woman relationship."
