= Salaami =

- Directed by: Shahrukh Sultan
- Story by: Lovely Singh
- Produced by: Tess Mirza
- Starring: Ayub Khan; Kabir Bedi; Saeed Jaffery Raushni Jaffery
- Music by: Nadeem-Shravan
- Release date: 18 March 1994
- Running time: 2 hours 28 min
- Country: India
- Language: Hindi

Salaami is a 1994 Indian Bollywood romantic action film directed by Shahrukh Sultan and produced by Tess Mirza. It stars Ayub Khan, Raushni Jafrey and Samyukta Singh in pivotal roles.

== Plot ==
Vijay a cadet of military academy falls in love with Sami. Sami's mother Mrs. Kapoor was a victim of a broken love and she is dead against the love affairs of her daughter. in the meantime Vijay confronts a corrupt police officer Gautam, who kidnaps Vijay's mother and Sami.

== Cast ==
- Ayub Khan as Vijay
- Kabir Bedi as Captain
- Saeed Jaffery as Commandant
- Beena Banerjee as Mrs. Kapoor
- Goga Kapoor as SP Gautam
- Samyukta Singh as Sami
- Roshni Jaffery as Kavita
- Raghvinder Singh Khatri as Brigadier R S Khatri
- Shivpujan Tiwari as Commander

== Soundtrack ==
Salaami

Soundtrack album by Nadeem-Shravan
- Released: February 7 1993
- Recorded: 1993
- Genre: Feature film soundtrack
- Length: 52:39
- Label: Venus Records & Tapes

The music was composed by Nadeem-Shravan. The songs are written by Madan Pal, Sameer, Surendra Sathi and Anwar Sagar. Singers Asha Bhosle, Kumar Sanu, Alka Yagnik, Kavita Krishnamurthy, Pankaj Udhas rendered their voices in the album. This album was massive popular when released especially track "Chehra Kya Dekhte Ho" sang by Kumar Sanu & Asha Bhosle. According to the Indian trade website Box Office India, with around 22,00,000 units sold the soundtrack became the tenth highest-selling album of the year.

#	Song	Singer
1.	"Chehra Kya Dekhte Ho"	Asha Bhosle, Kumar Sanu
2.	"Tumhe Chhede Hawa Chanchal"	Kumar Sanu, Alka Yagnik
3.	"Bas Ek Tamanna Hai"	Kumar Sanu, Alka Yagnik
4.	"Mere Mehboob Ki Yehi Pehchan"	Kumar Sanu
5.	"Jab Haal-E-Dil Tumse Kehne Ko"	Alka Yagnik
6.	"Mile Tum Se Bichhad Ke Hum"	Kumar Sanu, Alka Yagnik, Kavita Krishnamurthy
7.	"Dil Jab Se Toot Gaya" (Male)	Pankaj Udhas
8.	"Jab Haal-E-Dil" (Sad)	Alka Yagnik
9.	"Dil Jab Se Toot Gaya" (Duet)	Pankaj Udhas, Alka Yagnik
