= Jeena Sirf Merre Liye =

2002 film directed by Talat Jani

- Poster
- Directed by: Talat Jani
- Written by: Bolu Khan; Aman Jaffrey; Rumi Jaffrey
- Based on: Manasantha Nuvve by V. N. Aditya
- Produced by: Vashu Bhagnani
- Starring: Kareena Kapoor; Tusshar Kapoor; Mallika Sherawat
- Cinematography: Johny Lal
- Edited by: Sanjay Verma
- Music by: Nadeem–Shravan
- Production company: Pooja Entertainment
- Release date: 1 November 2002
- Country: India
- Language: Hindi

Jeena Sirf Merre Liye (transl. Live only for me) is a 2002 Indian Hindi-language romance film directed by Talat Jani and produced by Vashu Bhagnani. The film stars Kareena Kapoor, Tusshar Kapoor and Mallika Sherawat in her debut, with Kader Khan, Vijayendra Ghatge, Himani Shivpuri, Alok Nath in supporting roles. An official remake of the 2001 Telugu film Manasantha Nuvve (2001), Jeena Sirf Merre Liye is about two estranged childhood friends.

== Plot ==
Karan (Tusshar Kapoor) and Pinky (Puja) (Kareena Kapoor). Pinky and her father come to a hill station every year during Pinky's school break. Pinky looks forward to coming here for one reason: Karan. They get separated after Puja's father (Vijayendra Ghatge), a tycoon, goes back to the city. Karan gets adopted by a man also from the city. Puja's father sends her to his brother's house out of the country. Time passes, and the two live with each other's memories. They try to find each other but are unable to.

She writes out her childhood story to find Karan and comes across Seema (Mallika Sherawat). Seema comes across Karan and believes him to be her boyfriend. She invited Karan to a party. Puja and Karan were introduced to each other. Later, Seema asks Karan to sing on stage. Karan sang the song "Jeena Sirf Merre Liye," which is when Puja realises that he is her childhood love. Meanwhile, the story that Puja wrote became so popular that Seema's boss wanted to make a film out of it. Seema reads the story and realises that Karan and Puja were searching for each other. Seema goes to tell Karan. As he's going to find Puja, he gets a call from his dad that his sister's wedding has been canceled.

The reason was Puja's father; he didn't approve of Puja and Karan. He gave Karan only two choices: to forget about his love and his sister's wedding will continue, or he unites with Puja and his sister will not be accepted and ruin his family reputation. He immediately called Puja and said he's going to meet her. Puja, not knowing all this, has been waiting for this moment to come. When they met, Puja confessed her feelings to him. Karan said that he has been in love with her ever since they met at the party. Puja was hurt and angry at the same time. She ran away crying. Seema asks Puja for the climax of the story, but Puja refuses and asks Seema to find someone else to write the climax. Seema sensed something was wrong. She goes and meets Karan's best friend and asks him to reveal any secrets they have been hiding. Seema, find out the truth and tell Puja. Puja realises the truth and marries Karan in front of her father. He shoots Karan, who survives. In the end, they live happily ever after.

== Cast ==
- Kareena Kapoor as Pooja Khanna a.k.a. Pinky
- Tusshar Kapoor as Karan Malhotra
- Mallika Sherawat as Seema
- Kader Khan as Mahendra Malhotra
- Vijayendra Ghatge as Mr. Rajiv Khanna, Pooja's father
- Himani Shivpuri as Mrs. Malhotra
- Alok Nath as Mr. Khanna

== Production ==
Sanjay Dutt was supposed to play Tushar Kapoor's elder brother, but his character was scrapped after he declined the role.

== Soundtrack ==
The film's music was composed by duo Nadeem–Shravan.

Jeena Sirf Merre Liye

Soundtrack album by Nadeem-Shravan
- Released: 1 November 2002 (Film)
- Recorded: 2002
- Genre: Feature Film soundtrack
- Length: 43:42
- Language: Hindi
- Labels: Pooja Music; Sangeet Music

#	Title	Singer(s)	Lyricist
1	"Allah Allah"	Sonu Nigam, Alka Yagnik	Nadeem–Shravan
2	"Jeena Sirf Mere Liye"	Babul Supriyo, Alka Yagnik, Kavita Krishnamurthy	Sameer
3	"Tu Hai Sola"	Abhijeet, Kavita Krishnamurthy, Nandu Bhende	Nadeem–Shravan
4	"Kaash Ke Tujhse Main Kabhi Milta"	K.K., Alka Yagnik	Sameer
5	"Pyaar Maange"	Babul Supriyo, Sunidhi Chauhan	Nadeem–Shravan
6	"Ek Baar To India"	Alka Yagnik	Nadeem–Shravan
7	''Dupatta''	Anuradha Sriram, Sapna Awasthi	Nadeem–Shravan

== Reception ==
Taran Adarsh of Bollywood Hungama rated the film 1 1/2 out of 5 stars, writing: "On the whole, Jeena Sirf Merre Liye brings the successful combination [of actors] together, but it lacks a cohesive script and more importantly, the grip to sustain the viewer's interest."
