= Gaurav Dagaonkar =

Indian singer and founder of Hoopr

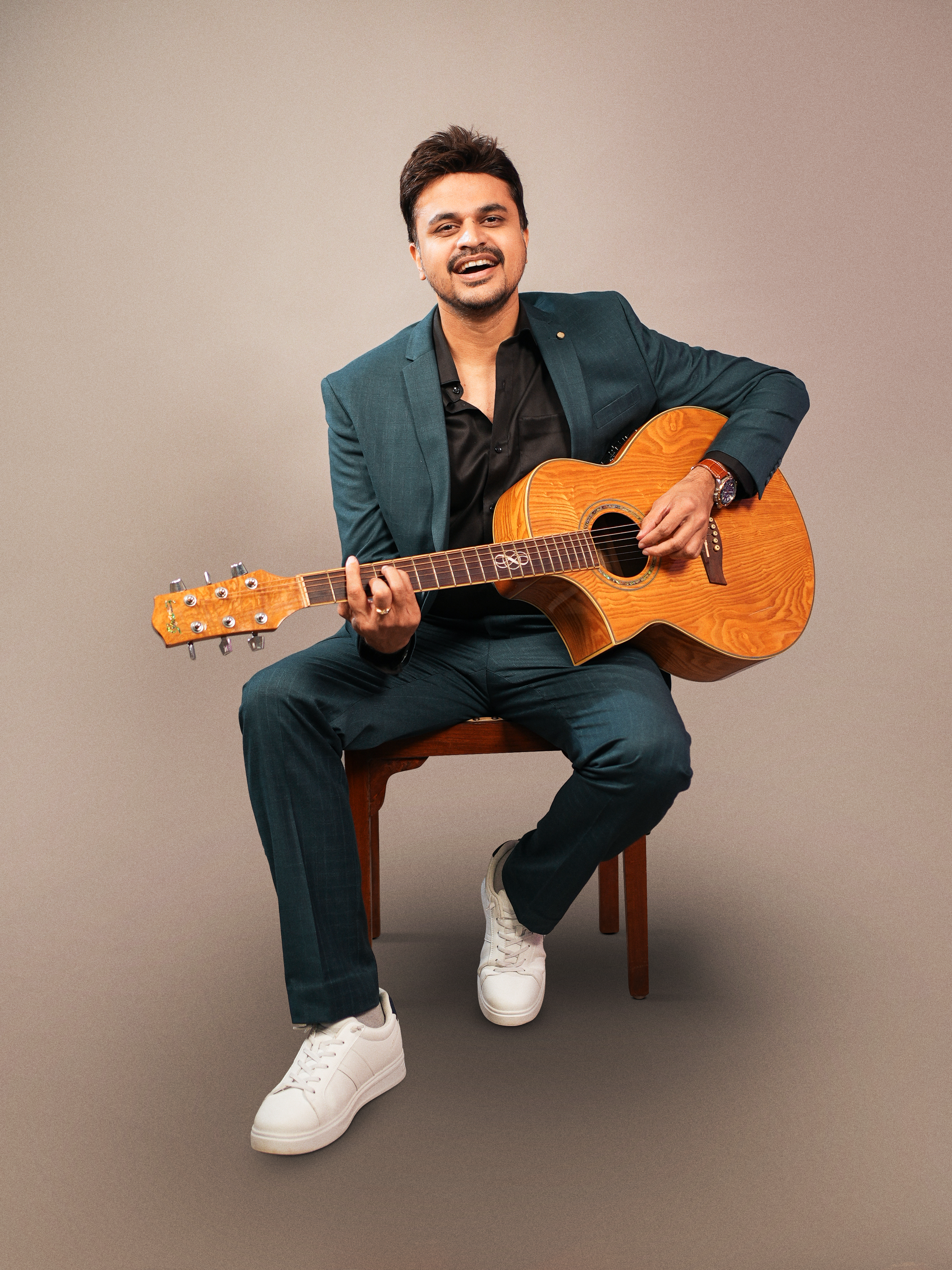
- Dagaonkar in 2025
- Born: 10 July 1982 (age 44); Mumbai, India
- Education: Thadomal Shahani Engineering College, IIM Ahmedabad
- Occupations: Co-founder & CEO of Hoopr.ai; composer, singer-songwriter, producer
- Years active: 2008–present
- Spouse: Arunima Bhattacharya
- Website: http://gauravdagaonkar.com/

Gaurav Dagaonkar is an Indian singer, music director and a music technology entrepreneur, most notably as the co-founder and CEO of music licensing platform Hoopr and Songfest. He has served as a music director for various movies, been an independent musician, and has sung songs in multiple languages for movies across India, Nepal, and Sri Lanka.

== Early life ==
Dagaonkar was born in Mumbai and obtained an engineering degree in information technology from Thadomal Shahani Engineering College. He then secured admission at IIM Ahmedabad in 2004. As part of his summer internship at IIMA, Dagaonkar interned with Times Music, a music company based in Mumbai.

Upon graduation in 2006, Dagaonkar opted out of placements, to opt for a career in music. His demo album was released by Infosys Chairman Mr. Narayana Murthy in 2006. After this, he played live gigs opening for artists such as Mohit Chauhan, Shankar–Ehsaan–Loy, and Junoon (band), at college festivals. Within two years, in February 2008, he was signed to Universal Music, India and put out a pop album titled College Days.

== Music career ==
=== Music director ===
In 2012, Dagaonkar made his debut as music director in Bollywood with the song ‘Soniye’, sung by Rahat Fateh Ali Khan for the movie ‘Will You Marry Me’. His second movie ‘Lanka’ starring Manoj Bajpai also released in the same year. Dagaonkar composed two songs for the movie, sung by KK and Shreya Ghoshal.

Gaurav composed an item number called Kaafirana in the film "Joker", directed by Shirish Kunder, starring Akshay Kumar and Sonakshi Sinha. The song was sung by Sunidhi Chauhan and picturized on Chitrangada Singh. In the same year, Dagaonkar also composed songs in the movie ‘Heartless’, starring Adhyayan Suman. Dagaonkar composed 5 songs in the movie, which were sung by Arijit Singh, KK, Mohit Chauhan, Ash King and Shekhar Suman. The song ‘Main Dhoondhne Ko Zamaane Mein’, sung by Arijit Singh, achieved notable success.

In 2016, he composed the soundtrack for the Marathi film One Way Ticket which earned him nominations for Best Music Director and Best Music Album at the Radio Mirchi Awards and Zee Gaurav Awards. The song "Mast Malanga" from the film received Best Upcoming Playback Singer award at the Radio Mirchi Awards.

Dagaonkar also composed and produced The Chamiya Song, a vibrant wedding track featuring West Indies cricketer Dwayne Bravo and Indian dancer Shakti Mohan. The track was well-received for its energetic beats and catchy melody, further showcasing Dagaonkar’s versatility as a music producer. In 2023, he composed the title track music for the film 'Saali Mohabbat,' produced by Manish Malhotra and starring Tisca Chopra.

=== Synchronicity ===
Gaurav is the lead vocalist and frontman of the group 'Synchronicity'. Synchronicity is also the name of the series started by Gaurav in which he performs mashups of popular Bollywood, Nepali and Western songs. The first mashup to be recorded and shot as a music video in this series was ‘Tujhe Bhula Diya / Hello.’ The video has had over 500,000 hits on YouTube. Subsequently, two more tracks, ‘Yara Sili Sili / Careless Whisper’ and ‘Pee Loon / You Sang To Me’ were released to a great response. The band Synchronicity was subsequently formed with Dagaonkar and Arunima Bhattacharya as the permanent singers along with many guests such as Neeti Mohan, Shalmali Kholgade, Rahul Saxena, Natalie De Luccio, Ustad Sawan Khan, Thomson Andrews, and Vidhi Sharma in live shows.

=== As a performing artist ===
As a live performer, Gaurav plays with a four-piece band and has performed at some of the biggest festivals in India such as Mood Indigo (IIT Bombay), Chaos (IIM Ahmedabad), Backwaters (IIM Kozhikode). He has shared the stage with renowned artists and bands from India and Pakistan such as Junoon, Silk Route, Mohit Chauhan, Parikrama, Rahul Sharma, etc. He is one of the official brand ambassadors of Gibson guitars in India. Gaurav has been featured amongst the "Faces of the Future" by India Today.

== Entrepreneur ==
Dagaonkar along with Meghna Mittal launched Songfest in 2017 and offered viral marketing solutions to brands and video creators in collaboration with some popular artists. They have created branded music content for brands such as Nestle, Mars-Wrigley, Hike Sticker Chat, ALT Balaji, Magicpin, etc. and have worked with artists such as Shaan, Monali Thakur, Nikhil D'souza, etc.

Their DOUBLEMINT Freshtake campaign won the ET Brand Equity Shark Award for Best Brand Integration, while ‘Aadatein’ won the Brandwagon Ace Award for Best Influencer Marketing. They also received the afaqs! Digies award for Magicpin (The Bread Ad | Asli Savings campaign) for Best Viral Video and Best Use of Viral Marketing.

He also is the CEO of Hoopr, a music licensing platform that provides copyright-safe music for creators and businesses. The firm secured $1.5 million in a seed funding round led by 9Unicorns and Venture Catalysts at the end of 2021.

Hoopr launched Hoopr Brand Solutions to enhance music-driven marketing and has played a role in introducing new music collaborations, including collaborations with Himalaya Wellness, 'Too Yumm!' and Bingo 'Tedhe Medhe' integrating music with advertising.

== Discography ==
=== As a playback singer ===
Year	Title	Writer	Producer	Singer	Language
2015	Wassane	Dilan Gamage	Shenal Maddumage	Gaurav Dagaonkar	Sinhala
2014	Kawada Ho	Dilan Gamage	Gaurav Dagaonkar (Music Director)	Gaurav Dagaonkar	Sinhala
2013	Ab Laut Aa (Reprise)	Niranjan Iyengar	Sanjoy Deb	Gaurav Dagaonkar	Hindi
2013	Liquor Fikar	Anurag Bhomia	Gaurav Dagaonkar	Gaurav Dagaonkar	Hindi
2008	College Days	Gaurav Dagaonkar	Ranjit Barot	Gaurav Dagaonkar	Hindi
2020	Intehaan	Kunwar Juneja	Gaurav Dagaonkar	Gaurav Dagaonkar	Hindi
2020	Aadetein	Anurag Bhomia	Anurag Khandait	Nikhil D'Souza	Hindi

=== As a Music Director ===
Year	Film	Director	Star Cast	Song name (Singer)	Notes
2017	Babumoshai Bandookbaaz	Kushan Nandy	Nawazuddin Siddiqui, Bidita Bag, Jatin Goswami, Shraddha Das	"Barfani (Male)" (Armaan Malik) "Ghungta" (Neha Kakkar) "Aye Saiyan" (Orunima Bhattacharya, Vivek Nair) "Chulbuli" (Papon) "Barfani (Female)" (Orunima Bhattacharya)	
2016	One Way Ticket	Kamal Nathani	Gashmeer Mahajani, Sachit Patil, Amruta Khanvilkar, Neha Mahajan, Shashank Ketkar		Marathi Film Debut
2014	Heartless	Shekhar Suman	Adhyayan Suman, Ariana Ayam, Shekhar Suman	All	
2012	Chal Pichchur Banate Hain	Pritish Chakraborty	Rahil Tandon, Bhavna Ruparel, Mukesh Bhatt	"Baawra Mann" (Sunidhi Chauhan)	
2012	Joker	Shirish Kunder	Akshay Kumar, Sonakshi Sinha, Shreyas Talpade	"Kaafirana" (Sunidhi Chauhan)	
2012	Will You Marry Me	Aditya Datt	Rajeev Khandelwal, Shreyas Talpade, Mugdha Godse	"Soniye" (Rahat Fateh Ali Khan)	
2011	Lanka	Maqbool Khan	Manoj Bajpai, Arjan Bajwa, Tia Bajpai	"Sheet Leher" (Shreya Ghoshal) "Barham Hain Hum" (KK)	

== Personal life ==
Gaurav Dagaonkar married Arunima Bhattacharya, a singer, in 2014. The couple resides in Mumbai with their daughter, Ara. Apart from his musical & entrepreneurial career, Gaurav enjoys watching movies and takes an active role in mentoring upcoming music creators.
