= Rohit Khurana =

Indian television actor

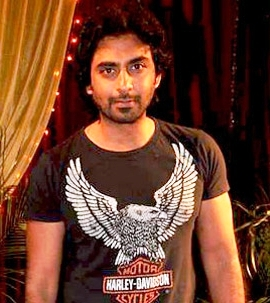
- Khurana in 2011
- Born: 20 November 1978 (age 47); Delhi India
- Occupations: Actor, Model
- Years active: 2001; 2008–2019
- Known for: Uttaran; Karmaphal Daata Shani
- Spouse: Neha Khurana
- Children: 2

Rohit Khurana is an Indian television actor known for his work as Vansh Singh Bundela/Rocky in Uttaran and Shani in Karmaphal Daata Shani.

== Personal life ==
Khurana is married to his school friend Neha. They had a son and daughter.

== Career ==
=== Modelling, acting debut and breakthrough (2001–13) ===
Khurana started his career as a model in Delhi. In TV, he had a small role in the serial Choti Maa: Ek Anokha Bandhan in 2001. In 2008, he obtained a lead role as Abhiram in the Telugu film Sangamam. However, it failed to perform well commercially because of a lack of commercial elements.

His first major breakthrough and official debut in TV occurred with the dual role of Vansh Singh Bundela / Rocky in the Indian soap opera Uttaran on Colors TV in 2009, opposite Tina Datta. The show garnered him fame.

In 2010, Khurana featured in Star One's Miley Jab Hum Tum. He was next featured in Maayke Se Bandhi Dor on Star Plus in 2011. That year he made his Bollywood debut with the Hindi movie Men Will Be Men. It failed to perform well commercially.

In 2012, Khurana was cast in the Tamil film Billa II. He forayed into Punjabi cinema with rom-com Dil Tainu Karda Ae Pyar. In 2013, his second Punjabi film, Singh vs Kaur, was released.

Returning to Hindi television, Khurana performed the lead role in Sony Entertainment Television's 2013 love story Dil Ki Nazar Se Khoobsurat, opposite Soumya Seth. He was praised for his performance as Madhav Periwal, an ugly man. He left the series after his character's death.

=== Further works and success (2013–present) ===
Towards the end of 2013, Khurana joined Colors TV's popular daily soap Sasural Simar Ka. He was cast as Shaurya Singhania, an antagonist opposite Falaq Naaz. He left the soap after three months. Afterwards, he took a short break from acting.

Khurana ended his break in 2015, and came back to TV playing Jamaal Peshawari in Zee TV's Lajwanti. That year he had an extended cameo appearance in Star Plus's Suhani Si Ek Ladki as Rohan, a lawyer. From 2015 to 2016, he portrayed the part of Viraat in Big Magic's Chatur Aur Chalak, Birbal aur Viraat. He was chosen for the character of a garbage man in the Hindi short film Girl in Red.

The role of Dr. Manav Garewal in Colors TV's reincarnation-based romance Kasam Tere Pyaar Ki marked Khurana's first television venture of 2017. He then appeared in the film Hotel Beautifool. He received immense praise for his portrayal of adult Shani in Colors TV's mythological series Karmaphal Daata Shani, a role he received in the last quarter of 2017. He played the same role as a guest in another Colors TV mythological show, Mahakali — Anth Hi Aarambh Hai.

In 2019, Khurana was cast in Colors TV's supernatural series Tantra as Daksh Mehra.

In 2020, he played as Shani Dev in Devi Adi Parashakti.

== Filmography ==
Television

Year	Show	Role	Channel	Notes
2009–2012	Uttaran	Vansh Singh / Rocky Shah	Colors TV	
2010	Miley Jab Hum Tum	Dhruv / Chintu	Star One	
2011	Maayke Se Bandhi Dor	Bhaskar	Star Plus	
2013	Dil Ki Nazar Se Khoobsurat	Madhav Periwal / Ehsaas	Sony TV	
2013	Sasural Simar Ka	Shaurya Singhania	Colors TV	
2015	Lajwanti	Jamaal Peshawari	Zee TV	
2015	Suhani Si Ek Ladki	Rohan	Star Plus	
2015–2016	Chatur aur Chalak, Birbal aur Viraat (Season 1& 2)	Viraat	Big Magic	
2017	Kasam Tere Pyaar Ki	Dr. Manav Garewal	Colors TV	
2017–2018	Karmaphal Daata Shani	Shani	Colors TV	
2017	Mahakali — Anth Hi Aarambh Hai	Shani	Colors TV	
2019	Tantra	Daksh Mehra	Colors TV	
2020	Devi Adi Parashakti	Shani	DangalTV	
2025	Ganesh Kartikey	Gajasura	Sony SAB	

Films

Year(s)	Film	Role	Language	Notes
2008	Sangamam	Abhiram	Telugu	
2009	Unnaipol Oruvan	Giri	Tamil	
2009	Eenadu	Giri	Telugu	
2011	Men Will Be Men	Sunder	Hindi	
2012	Billa II	Satish Kumar	Tamil	
2012	Dil Tainu Karda Ae Pyar	Cop	Punjabi	
2013	Singh vs Kaur	Roop	Punjabi	
2016	Girl in Red	Kachre Wala	Hindi	
2017	Hotel Beautifool		Hindi	

== Awards ==
- 2010 - New Talent Award for Best Supporting Actor — Uttaran.
