= Sukumarudu =

- Film poster
- Directed by: G. Ashok
- Produced by: K. Venugopal
- Starring: Aadi; Nisha Agarwal; Bhavna Ruparel; Sarada
- Cinematography: Sai Sriram
- Edited by: Prawin Pudi
- Music by: Anup Rubens
- Production company: Sri Soudhamini Creations
- Release date: 10 May 2013
- Running time: 172 minutes
- Country: India
- Language: Telugu

Sukumarudu is a 2013 Indian Telugu-language romantic drama film directed by G. Ashok and produced by K. Venugopal's Sri Soudhamini Creations. The film stars Aadi in the title role alongside Nisha Agarwal and Bhavna Ruparel and Sarada. Krishna appears in a guest role. Music is composed by Anup Rubens. The film was theatrically released on 10 May 2013.

== Plot ==
The story is about Sukumar (Aadi), a rich, young guy who lives abroad. His family lives in a beautiful village in India. Sukumar comes back because of his ancestral property. There is Sankari (Nisha Aggarwal), a beautiful girl waiting to fall in love. Sukumar faces difficulty from a few family members, and what follows is how he manages to win hearts (and property).

== Cast ==
- Aadi as Sukumar
- Nisha Agarwal as Sankari
- Bhavna Ruparel as Devaki
- Krishna (guest appearance)
- Sharada as Vardhanamma
- Srinivas Avasarala as ANR
- Rao Ramesh as SVR
- Chandra Mohan
- Devadas Kanakala
- Tanikella Bharani
- Gollapudi Maruti Rao
- Thagubothu Ramesh
- Jaya Prakash Reddy
- M. S. Narayana
- Chalapathi Rao
- Suthi Velu
- Dhanraj
- Satya
- Vennela Kishore
- Raghu Babu
- Tirupathi Prakash
- Raghu Karumanchi as U. Venkat Rao
- Chitram Srinu
- Venu Yeldandi
- Prudhvi Raj
- Sri Lakshmi
- Jenny as Judge
- Ramjagan
- Sanjay Swaroop
- Namala Murthy
- Jogi Naidu
- Sarika Ramachandra Rao
- Alapati Lakshmi
- Surekha Vani as Church sister
- Rocket Raghava

== Production ==
The audio launch was held in Hyderabad on 31 March 2013. The launching of the shooting of the film began at Ramanaidu studios in Hyderabad on 23 May 2012. Sreenu Vaitla gave the first clap. K S Rama Rao and Bellamkonda Suresh switched the camera on. Later the shooting was shifted to Ramoji film city where key scenes featuring Aadi and Nisha were shot. In August, it was reported that The film is being made with a big star cast of 54 artists, the film completed 60% of shot in 2 schedules. The producers stated that the Schedule would start from 24 October and would be completed or on nearly 9 November and the film would be Released in December after the completion of its patchwork in November.

== Release ==
The movie was awarded a U/A Certificate by The Central Board of Film Certification on 4 May 2013. The movie is slated for a worldwide release on 10 May 2013.

== Soundtrack ==
Sukumarudu

Soundtrack album by Anup Rubens
- Released: 31 March 2013
- Recorded: 2012–2013
- Genre: Feature film soundtrack
- Length: 28:21
- Language: Telugu
- Label: Aditya Music
- Producer: Anup Rubens

Anup Rubens chronology
Gunde Jaari Gallanthayyinde (2013)	Sukumarudu (2013)	Autonagar Surya (2013)

The music was composed by Anoop Rubens. The audio was launched on 31 March 2013 at Novatel Hotel in Hyderabad. Aditya Music won the audio rights of this film. The audio got positive response.

Track listing
No.	Title	Lyrics	Singer(s)	Length
1.	"Tongi Tongi (Club Mix)"	Balaji	Vijay Prakash	03:23
2.	"Manasuna Veyyi"	Balaji	Vijay Prakash	04:05
3.	"Sukumarudu"	Balaji	Raja Hasan, Rajesh, Dhanunjay Seepana, Manju, Ramya, Pradeepthi	04:09
4.	"Manasuna Nuvvele"	Rambhatla	Anjana Sowmya	04:44
5.	"Tongi Tongi"	Kandikonda	Suchitra & Ramki	03:31
6.	"Neelakashamlo"	Sri Mani	Shreya Ghoshal	04:25
7.	"O Baby Naa Lokam"	Sri Mani	Anoop Rubens, Chorus	04:04
Total length:				28:21

== Reception ==
Sushil Rao of The Times of India gave the film 3 out of 5. Both Business Standard and News18 India gave the film 1 out of 2 and 2.5 out of 5 quoting "The film turns cheerful after the arrival of the protagonist in the village, but the overall presentation gets melodramatic and, therefore, it fails to engage the audience throughout." NDTV praised Aadi's dance moves but criticized it emotional scenes.
