= Helicopter Eela =

2018 film directed by Pradeep Sarkar

- Theatrical release poster
- Directed by: Pradeep Sarkar
- Written by: Mitesh Shah (Dialogue)
- Screenplay by: Mitesh Shah; Anand Gandhi
- Based on: Beta Kaagdo by Anand Gandhi
- Produced by: Ajay Devgn; Jayantilal Gada; Aksshay Jayantilal Gada
- Starring: Kajol; Riddhi Sen
- Cinematography: Sirsha Ray
- Edited by: Dharmendra Sharma
- Music by: Songs: Amit Trivedi; Anu Malik; Raghav Sachar; Daniel B. George; Background Score: Daniel B. George
- Production companies: Ajay Devgn FFilms; Pen Studios
- Distributed by: Pen Studios (India); Eros International (overseas)
- Release date: 12 October 2018
- Running time: 130 minutes
- Country: India
- Language: Hindi
- Budget: ₹20 crores
- Box office: ₹8.24 crores

Helicopter Eela is a 2018 Indian Hindi-language comedy-drama film directed by Pradeep Sarkar. It features Kajol in the lead role as an aspiring singer and single mother and helicopter parent. The film is written by Mitesh Shah and Anand Gandhi and is based on the Gujarati play Beta, Kaagdo, written by Anand Gandhi.

Pre-production of the film began in January 2017, and principal photography commenced from 24 January 2018. It was released on 12 October 2018.

== Plot ==
Eela, a single mother rejoins her college to complete her education after 22 years. In the flashback, it is shown that she is an up-and-coming, semi-famous model/singer, who records songs written by her boyfriend Arun. When she is recording a career-breaking song for a Mahesh Bhatt project, the project gets cancelled indefinitely. So she and her boyfriend decide to get married. After a few months, she gives birth to a boy named Vivan. While seeing their family tree, Eela and Arun realise that many male members of Arun's family died in their late 30s, which drives Arun crazy as he is also in his late 30s. So he finally decides to leave Eela and Vivan to pursue his own dreams as it might be his final years. Afterwards, Arun leaves. Eela, now a single mom, is very over protective about Vivan. She keeps meddling in Vivan's life continuously and she finally joins the same college as Vivan to complete her studies. One day, suddenly, Arun returns and then leaves after he realizes that Eela and Vivan don't need him. Eela's meddling in Vivan's life gets to the point that Vivan decides to leave the family home to give Eela space to find her own identity. Eela joins a college theatre club, and starts singing again. During the annual singing competition she is not allowed to sing because of her age and past singing profession. But Vivan encourages her to sing on the stage. Together, they give a remarkable performance. In the credits, she is shown resuming her singing career, finding herself after many years.

== Cast ==
- Kajol as Eela Raiturkar, Vivan's mother, Arun's wife
- Riddhi Sen as Vivan Raiturkar, Arun and Eela's son
- Rashi Mal as Nikita
- Tota Roy Chowdhury as Arun Raiturkar, Eela's husband, Vivan’s father
- Neha Dhupia as Padma
- Shataf Figar as Madhavi Bhogat
- Muskan Bamne as Deepthi
- Zakir Hussain as Principal of college
- Atul Kulkarni as Prime Minister
- R J Alok as Chemistry Professor

Cameo appearances

- Imran Khan as himself
- Anu Malik as himself
- Swarnalekha Gupta as Alisha Chinai
- Ila Arun as herself
- Baba Sehgal as himself
- Mahesh Bhatt as himself
- Shaan as himself
- Amitabh Bachchan

== Marketing and promotion ==
The first trailer of the movie was released on 5 August 2018 having an initial release date as 7 September 2018. But later, the movie release date was postponed to 12 October 2018.

== Soundtrack ==
Helicopter Eela

Soundtrack album by Amit Trivedi, Anu Malik, Raghav Sachar and Daniel B. George
- Released: 3 October 2018
- Recorded: 2018
- Genre: Feature film soundtrack
- Length: 24:24
- Language: Hindi
- Labels: Saregama Music; Tips Music

Amit Trivedi chronology
| Andhadhun (2018) | Helicopter Eela (2018) | Kedarnath (2018) |

Raghav Sachar chronology
| Guest Iin London (2017) | Helicopter Eela (2018) | Bhaiaji Superhit (2018) |

The background score and two originals of the film is composed by Daniel B. George and other songs are composed by Amit Trivedi and Raghav Sachar. The lyrics are written by Swanand Kirkire, Asma Nabeel and Shyam Anuragi (noted). The first song "Mumma Ki Parchai" was released on 13 August 2018. The second song "Yaadon Ki Almari" was released on 20 August 2018. The song of the film, "Ruk Ruk Ruk Arre Baba Ruk" from the 1994 film Vijaypath originally sung by Alisha Chinai and composed by Anu Malik has been recreated for this film by Raghav Sachar in the voice of Palomi Ghosh.

Track listing
| No. | Title | Music | Singer(s) | Length |
|---|---|---|---|---|
| 1. | "Mumma Ki Parchai" | Amit Trivedi | Ronit Sarkar | 4:06 |
| 2. | "Yaadon Ki Almari" | Amit Trivedi | Palomi Ghosh | 3:49 |
| 3. | "Dooba Dooba" | Amit Trivedi | Arijit Singh, Sunidhi Chauhan | 4:03 |
| 4. | "Chand Lamhe" (Lyrics by Asma) | Daniel B. George | Shilpa Rao | 4:04 |
| 5. | "Khoya Ujaala" | Daniel B.George | Palomi Ghosh | 4:13 |
| 6. | "Ruk Ruk Ruk" (Lyrics by Shyam Anuragi) | Raghav Sachar; (Original by Anu Malik) | Palomi Ghosh | 4:09 |
| Total length: | | | | 24:24 |

== See also ==
- Helicopter parent
