= Natalie Di Luccio =

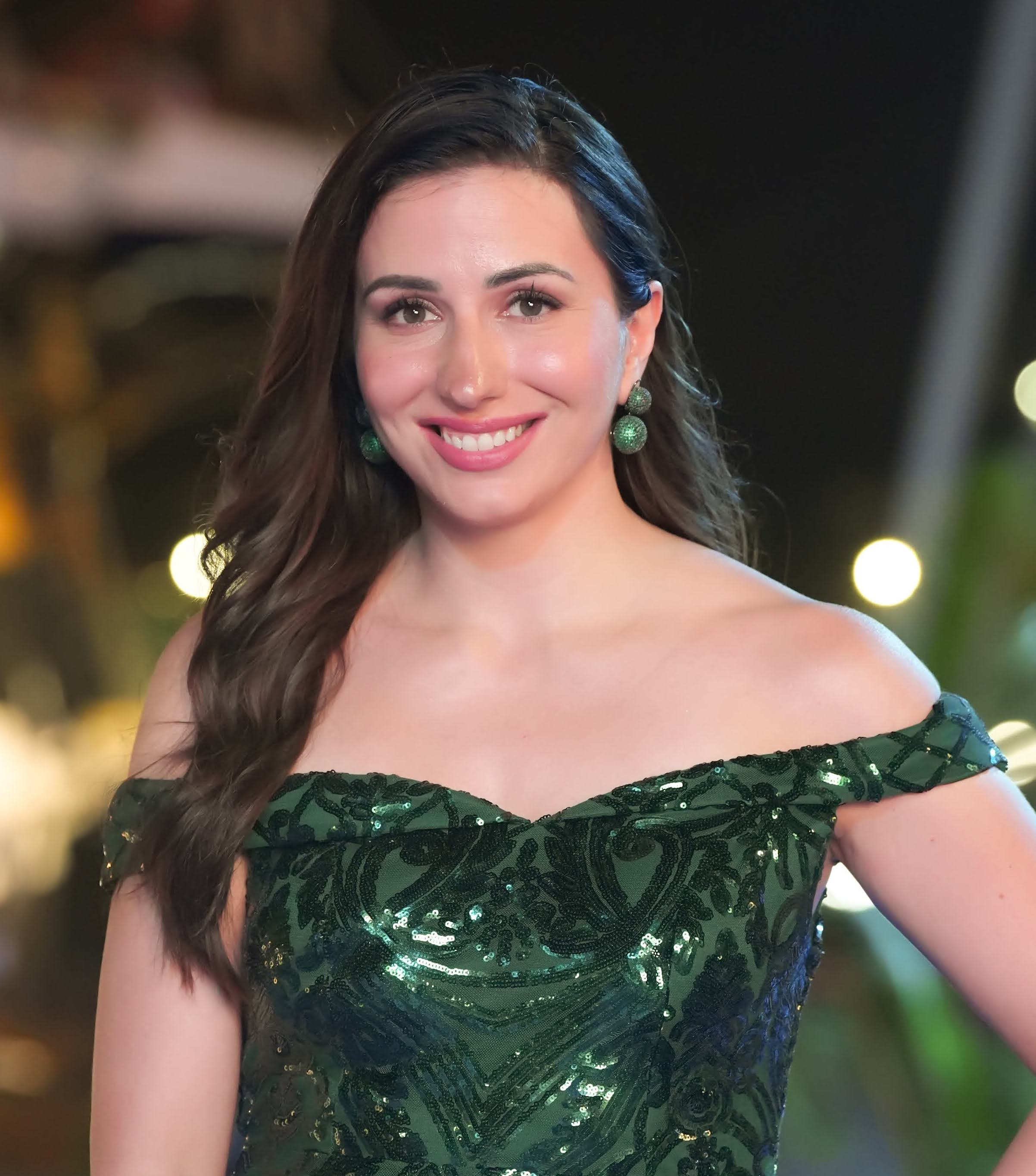
- Di Luccio in 2024

Background information
- Born: 29 June 1989 (age 37); Toronto, Ontario, Canada
- Origin: Woodbridge, Ontario, Canada
- Genres: Easy listening, operatic pop
- Occupations: Singer, playback singer
- Years active: 2009–present
- Spouse: Raghu Ram

Natalie Di Luccio is a Canadian classical-crossover singer of Italian heritage from Toronto, Ontario. Her career began in 2010 when she released music videos on YouTube of Bollywood film songs, which caught the attention of Grammy and Oscar Award winning composer A. R. Rahman. Di Luccio was later invited to perform with composer Amit Trivedi as well as on Coke Studio on MTV India. She started her professional career in Bollywood with notable playback singer Sonu Nigam and has been a singer for various feature film soundtracks (English Vinglish, Ladies vs Ricky Bahl, and Chennai Express).

== Early life ==
Di Luccio was born in Toronto, Canada, and trained to be a classical singer. Her father is from Agropoli, Campania, Italy, and her mother is from Canada.

She was a student at Cardinal Carter Academy for the Arts. She went to McGill University to study Western classical voice and pursue a career in music. She has said that some of her musical influences growing up were singers like Andrea Bocelli, Celine Dion and Josh Groban.

Di Luccio began working with multi-platinum Canadian music producer Matthew Tishler at the age of 13.

== Career ==
=== Early career and Bollywood work ===
Di Luccio's link with Bollywood started when she received a message over Myspace to record a small part in Sonu Nigam's devotional album, Maha Ganesha, in 2009. She later went on to record a Michael Jackson tribute song with Sonu Nigam.

Di Luccio shot to fame when she recorded and released on YouTube her version of a popular Bollywood song, "Tu Jaane Na". This music video reached over 1 million views overnight. After her YouTube success she was asked to be a part of many reality shows including the Indian reality TV show Bigg Boss, but rejected these offers to focus on her music.

She performed with Amit Trivedi and Shriram Iyer the song "Bari Bari" produced by Amit Trivedi, on Coke Studio, Season 2 broadcast on MTV India and DD National (National Channel of India).

In 2013, Di Luccio worked with Italian music producer Mauro Malavasi (Andrea Bocelli, Luciano Pavarotti). She spent time in Bologna connecting with her roots and recording new material with Malavasi.

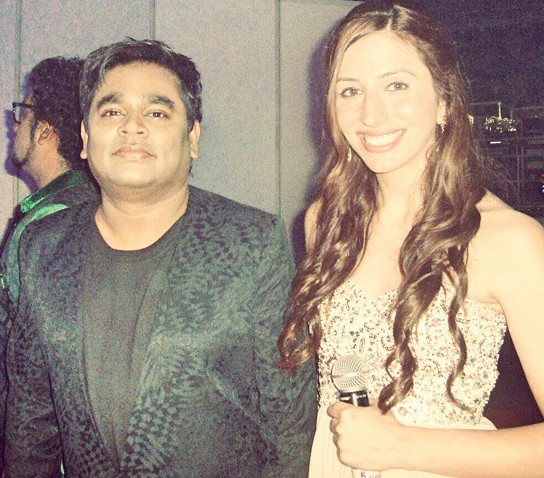
Natalie with A. R. Rahman at I audio launch in Chennai, India.

In 2013, Di Luccio sang a Gujarati song called "Prarthana". This was the first time a western classical piece had been sung in this language.

Di Luccio caught the attention of Grammy and Oscar winning composer A. R. Rahman and continues to join him on several occasions for live concerts across India. She made her Tamil music debut with "Aila Aila" composed by Rahman for the film I directed by Shankar. She performed the song live at the televised audio launch in Chennai on 15 September 2014. The launch was witnessed by honorary guests Arnold Schwarzenegger and Rajnikanth.

In May 2015 Di Luccio was a TEDxGateway speaker in Mumbai at NCPA Theatre. She spoke about the importance of getting out of one's comfort zone and about how music brought her to India.

Di Luccio has sung an Arabic piece for the soundtrack of the film "Muhammad: The Messenger of God" directed by Majid Majidi and composed by A.R.Rahman.

In 2018, Di Luccio opened for Sonu Nigam during his UK tour.

=== 2020–present ===
In 2020, Di Luccio released a version of "You Raise Me Up" in collaboration with members of the Angami tribe from Khonoma, Nagaland. The version was acknowledged by Secret Garden, the original creators of the song, who described it as a "special and rare version" on their official Facebook page. Industrialist Anand Mahindra also commented on the video on X, praising Di Luccio's voice and the Nagaland location featured in the video.

In November 2024, Di Luccio performed during the arrival of the Italian Navy training ship Amerigo Vespucci in Mumbai, India, appearing in the opening and closing ceremonies alongside the Italian Air Force military band.

In 2025, Di Luccio performed the song "Le Chal Wahan" for the JioHotstar series Hai Junoon!. The sequence featured her on screen with Neil Nitin Mukesh, with vocals by Di Luccio and Shaan.

In August 2025, she performed with Italian bandoneon and accordion player Mario Stefano Pietrodarchi in A New Dolce Vita: SOI Chamber Orchestra in Mumbai.

== Personal life ==
Di Luccio was in a relationship with Indian film and television actor Eijaz Khan from 2011 to 2015. They met on a plane during one of her initial visits to Mumbai. She said that Khan was the inspiration for her first Hindi song.

In 2018, Natalie married MTV Roadies creator Raghu Ram. On 6 January 2020, they had a baby boy named Rhythm.

== Television ==
Di Luccio joined Season 4 of Life Mein Ek Baar, an adventure travel show on Fox Life India. The series was shot in Hong Kong and premiered on 20 October 2015.

In May 2017, Di Luccio became a part of Nexa Journeys on the Asian Highway 1, a unique reality travel show which premiered on Discovery Channel India. Di Luccio, along with four known personalities, (Saransh Goila, Pallavi Sharda, Taras Taraporvala, and Girish Karkera), drove all the way from India to Thailand via Myanmar on the Asian Highway 1. Di Luccio collaborated with many local musicians along the way, most notably with Rewben Mashangva in Kohima, Nagaland.

== Discography ==
Year	Film	Song	Music director
2010	Band Baaja Baraat	"Aadha Ishq" - Additional vocal	Salim–Sulaiman
2011	Chalo Dilli	"Moments of Life"	Rohit Kulkarni
2011	Ladies vs Ricky Bahl	"Fatal Attraction"	Salim–Sulaiman
2012	Bittoo Boss	"Audi (Tenu Tak De)"	Raghav Sachar
2012	English Vinglish	"Navrai Majhi"	Amit Trivedi
2013	Kadal	"Anbin Vaasale (Italian Reprise)"	A. R. Rahman
2013	Chennai Express	"Ready Steady Po"	Vishal–Shekhar
2014	I	"Aila Aila"	A. R. Rahman
2015	Muhammad (SAL): The Messenger of God	"The Sea Miracle"	A. R. Rahman
2016	Befikra	"Befikra" (English Vocals)	Meet Bros
2016	Zero	"Eternal Love"	Nivas K. Prasanna
2024	Devara: Part 1	"All Hail The Tiger"	Anirudh Ravichander
2025	Hai Junoon!	"Le Chal Wahan"	Akshay Menon
2026	Gandhi Talks	"Dome Epais"	A. R. Rahman

== Music videos ==
- "Tu Jaane Na" – released on YouTube 29 September 2010
- "Kahin To Hogi Wo" – released on YouTube 2 November 2010
- "Pehla Nasha" – released on YouTube 28 April 2011
- "Baby, Te Amo" – released on YouTube 28 May 2012
- "Prarthana" – released on YouTube 19 September 2013
- "Khuda Jaane/Wrecking Ball" – released on YouTube 17 November 2013
- "O Holy Night" – released on YouTube on 12 December 2013
- "Galliyan" – released on YouTube 19 July 2014
- "Aila Aila"
- "Konjam Nilavu" – released on YouTube 18 March 2015
- "Hamari Adhuri Kahani" – released on YouTube 20 August 2015
- "A Dream from Rajasthan (Nella Fantasia)" – released on YouTube 17 March 2016
- "You Raise Me Up" (featuring the Angami Tribe, Nagaland) – released on YouTube 13 July 2021
- "Le Chal Wahan" from Hai Junoon! – released on YouTube 25 April 2025

== See also ==
- Akon, known for Chammak Challo Bollywood song
- Arash, known for Boro Boro Bollywood song
- Kylie Minogue, known for Chiggy Wiggy Bollywood song
- Snoop Dogg, known for Singh is Kinng Bollywood song
- Tata Young, known for Dhoom Dhoom Bollywood song
