= Bhaiaji Superhit =

- Theatrical release poster
- Directed by: Neerraj Pathak
- Written by: Neeraj Pathak
- Produced by: Chirag Mahendra Dhariwal
- Starring: Sunny Deol; Preity Zinta; Ameesha Patel; Arshad Warsi; Shreyas Talpade; Pankaj Tripathi; Sanjay Mishra; Jaideep Ahlawat
- Narrated by: Vijay Raaz
- Cinematography: Vishnu Rao; Kabir Lal
- Edited by: Sandeep Francis
- Music by: Songs: Jeet Gannguli; Raghav Sachar; Sanjeev–Darshan; Amjad Nadeem; Neerraj Pathak; Score: Vijay Verma; Anamik Chauhan; Lyton C
- Production company: Metro Movies
- Distributed by: Zee Studios
- Release date: 23 November 2018
- Country: India
- Language: Hindi

Bhaiaji Superhit (transl. Brother, superhit!; Hindi pronunciation: [bʱɛːjaːdʒiː]) is a 2018 Indian Hindi-language action comedy film directed by Neerraj Pathak and produced by Chirag Mahendra Dhariwal and Fauzia Arshi. The film stars Sunny Deol and Preity Zinta as main leads, along with Ameesha Patel, Arshad Warsi, Shreyas Talpade, Pankaj Tripathi, Sanjay Mishra and Jaideep Ahlawat.

== Plot ==
The story of a powerful but emotional don from Varanasi, Lal Bhaisahab Dubey, also known as 'Bhaiaji' or '3D'. Bhaiaji is a feared and respected crime lord in Varanasi, but his one weakness is his love for his wife, Sapna Dubey, the daughter of another crime boss. Sapna loves him a lot but is a feisty, suspicious and jealous woman. She leaves Bhaiaji in a fit of jealousy telling him that she will return only when he mends his ways. Her departure shatters him, and he becomes a crying, emotional wreck, which negatively impacts his professional life as a don.

Desperate to win his wife back, Bhaiaji comes up with a wild idea: he decides to produce and star in a movie based on their love story. He believes that if Sapna sees their life portrayed on the big screen, she will realize her mistake and return to him.

To achieve his goal, Bhaiaji kidnaps a shrewd and successful Bollywood director, Goldie Kapoor, along with a struggling writer named Tarun "Porno" Ghosh. He forces them to make the film titled Bhaiaji Superhit. A hot Bollywood superstar, Mallika Kapoor is also brought in to play the lead actress.

The making of the film becomes a chaotic affair. The movie's plot is meant to be a dramatized version of Bhaiaji's life and his love for Sapna, but it's constantly disrupted by his rival, another don named Helicopter Mishra, who is vying for control of the city.

The situation gets even more complicated when a doppelgänger of Bhaiaji, a struggling actor named Funny Singh, is brought into the film to act as the hero. This creates a series of mix-ups and identity crises, as no one can tell the real Bhaiaji from his reel-life counterpart.

Sapna, upon hearing about the film and the beautiful actress Mallika's involvement, becomes even more jealous and furious, and arrives on set, ready for a showdown. Meanwhile, Funny and Mallika fall in love, adding to the confusion.

The climax involves Bhaiaji having to prove his loyalty to Sapna and showing her that the film was only ever about their love. Ultimately, Bhaiaji is able to win back Sapna's love and loyalty, proving that despite his life of crime, he is dedicated to her above all else. On another happy note, Funny and Mallika also start working together.

== Cast ==
- Sunny Deol in a dual role as
  - Lal Bhaisahab Dubey / Bhaiaji 3D – Sapna's husband
  - Funny Singh – Bhaiaji's doppelgänger, Film hero
- Preity Zinta as Sapna Dubey – Bhaiaji’s wife
- Ameesha Patel as Mallika Kapoor – Film heroine
- Arshad Warsi as Goldie Kapoor – Film director
- Shreyas Talpade as Tarun "Porno" Ghosh – Film writer
- Pankaj Tripathi as Gupta – Builder
- Sanjay Mishra as Dr. Gyan Prakash Buddhisagar – Psychiatrist
- Jaideep Ahlawat as Helicopter Mishra
- Mukul Dev as Shakeel – Bhaiaji's gang member
- Evelyn Sharma as Stephanie
- Manoj Joshi as Police Commissioner Ghosh – Tarun's father
- Brijendra Kala as 3D's uncle
- Hemant Pandey as Charsi bhai – Bhaiaji's gang member
- Nawab Shah as Mishra's goon
- Amit Mistry as Lucky Singh Laapata – Bhaiaji's gang member
- Ranjeet as Sapna's father
- Simran Kaur Mundi
- Pankaj Jha as Gupta
- Ashmita Kaur as Pinky
- Shreya Arora as Sapna's sister
- Neha Mishra as Goldie's assistant
- Bobby Bedi as Mishra’s goon
- Vikas Shrivastav

== Production ==
The initial cast announced in 2011 which included Sunny Deol, Ameesha Patel, Arshad Warsi, Tusshar Kapoor and Prakash Raj. It was scheduled to release in 2012. In May 2012, it was reported that the director had approached Subhash Ghai after the producers refused to increase the film's budget by ₹6 crore (equivalent to ₹12 crore or US$1.3 million in 2026). Claims regarding the film being shelved were rejected by the film's cast and director. Ghai also denied that he was producing the film. In July of the same year, Kapoor left the project due to schedule conflicts with Shootout at Wadala and Kyaa Super Kool Hain Hum. Initially Zinta was removed from the cast due to unavailability of dates on her side. Shreyas Talpade replaced Kapoor.

In April 2013, Zinta confirmed her participation in the production. She plays the don's wife. A 45–days long shooting schedule, beginning in September 2013, was conducted in Udaipur, Rajasthan. Reportedly, in November 2013, there was a dispute between producer Mahendra Dhariwal and Deol. The latter wanted his remuneration before dubbing. Deol gave him the option that they could release the film under the banner of his production company Vijayta Films. Dhariwal consulted action director Tinu Verma, who advised that Deol should be paid and the project should be completed. However, shooting of a few of Zinta's scenes was delayed due to her involvement with the Indian Premier League. Kharaj Mukherjee will play the role of a police inspector. The director narrated the story to him over phone and he quickly agreed to join the project. Evelyn Sharma learnt Hindi by taking lessons for 2 hours a day. She also requested her friends to use only Hindi while conversing with her. Deol will play a double role. The project was stalled for 4 years before June 2015, when it was reported that filming would resume in July 2015. It is scheduled for release in October 2018.

== Music and soundtrack ==
Bhaiaji Superhit

Soundtrack album by Jeet Gannguli, Raghav Sachar, Amjad Nadeem, Sanjeev–Darshan and Neerraj Pathak
- Released: 25 September 2018
- Recorded: 2017–18
- Genre: Feature film soundtrack
- Length: 25:16
- Language: Hindi
- Label: Zee Music Company

Official audio
- Bhaiaji Superhit - Full Movie Audio Jukebox on YouTube

Jeet Gannguli chronology
Jalebi (2018)	Bhaiaji Superhit (2018)	Marudhar Express (2018)

Raghav Sachar chronology
Helicopter Eela (2018)	Bhaiaji Superhit (2018)	Blank (2019)

Sanjeev-Darshan chronology
Yamla Pagla Deewana: Phir Se (2018)	Bhaiaji Superhit (2018)	Amavas (2019)

The music for the film’s songs was composed by Jeet Gannguli, Raghav Sachar, Sanjeev–Darshan, Amjad Nadeem and Neeraj Pathak. The lyrics of the songs were penned by Amjad Nadeem, Kumaar, Shabbir Ahmed, Neeraj Pathak and Raftaar (rap).

The background score of the movie was done by Vijay Verma, Anamik Chauhan and Lyton C.

Track listing
No.	Title	Lyrics	Music	Singer(s)	Length
1.	"Sleepy Sleepy Akhiyan"	Kumaar	Jeet Gannguli	Asees Kaur, Yasser Desai	3:01
2.	"Do Naina"	Amjad Nadeem	Amjad Nadeem	Yasser Desai, Aakanksha Sharma	5:05
3.	"Om Namah Shivay"	Shabbir Ahmed	Raghav Sachar	Sukhwinder Singh, Raghav Sachar, Aakanksha Sharma, Raftaar	4:22
4.	"Naam Hai Bhaiaji"	Raftaar, Neerraj Pathak	Sanjeev–Darshan, Neerraj Pathak	Amit Mishra, Rap: Raftaar	3:32
5.	"Baby Jaanleva Hai"	Amjad Nadeem	Amjad Nadeem	Yasser Desai, Pawni Pandey	4:11
6.	"Do Naina" (Shafqat Version)	Amjad Nadeem	Amjad Nadeem	Shafqat Amanat Ali Khan, Aakanksha Sharma	5:05
Total length:					25:16
