= Amita Pathak =

Indian actress, model, and producer

Amita Pathak Sachar
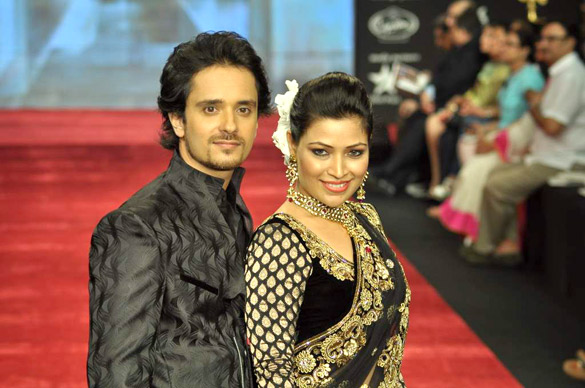
- Raghav Sachar and Amita Pathak
- Years active: 2006-2016
- Spouse: Raghav Sachar
- Parent: Kumar Mangat Pathak

Amita Pathak Sachar is an actress, model, and producer. She studied acting at the Kishore Namit Kapoor Acting Academy and the Shiamak Davar Institute of Performing Arts.

== Personal life ==
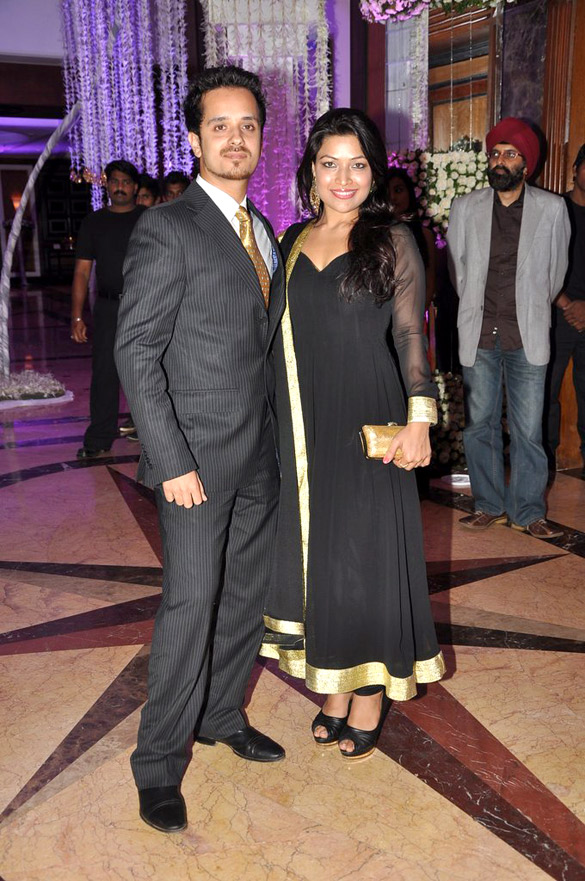
Raghav Sachar and Amita Pathak at the marriage reception of Sunidhi Chauhan

She is the daughter of producer Kumar Mangat Pathak and sister of director and producer Abhishek Pathak. Pathak married singer Raghav Sachar on 21 January 2014.

== Filmography ==
| Year | Film | Role | Notes |
|---|---|---|---|
| 2006 | Omkara | – | Executive Producer |
| 2008 | Haal-e-Dil | Sanjana Sharma | |
| 2010 | Aakrosh | Roshni | |
| 2012 | Bittoo Boss | Mrinalini Pariyar | |
| 2012 | Taur Mittran Di | Seerat | |
| 2013 | Aatma - Feel It Around You | – | Producer |
| 2016 | Ek Tha Hero | Janaki | |

== Music videos ==
| Year | Music video | Role |
|---|---|---|
| 2011 | Dil Ki Zuban | Model |
| 2017 | Kiki | Model |
| 2018 | Ishq Di Kuki | Model |
