= Men Will Be Men =

- Directed by: Gorky
- Written by: Harsh Khurana
- Screenplay by: Harsh Khurana
- Produced by: Samar Khan
- Starring: See More
- Cinematography: Sahil Kapoor
- Edited by: Devang Kakkad
- Music by: Harpreet; Advait Nemlekar
- Production company: Red Chillies Idiot Box
- Distributed by: PVR Pictures
- Release date: 29 April 2011
- Country: India
- Language: Hindi
- Box office: est. ₹19 lakh

Men Will Be Men is a 2011 Indian Hindi film starring Gaurav Chopra, Rohit Khurana, Zeenal Kamdar, Rajesh Kumar and Rahil Tandon. The film was produced by Red Chillies Entertainment and directed by Gorky.

== Cast ==
- Gaurav Chopra as Jimmy
- Zeenal Kamdar as Deepa
- Rohit Khurana as Sundar
- Rajesh Kumar as Preet
- Rahil Tandon as Bobby
- Rajesh Khattar as Boss

== Reception ==
A critic from The Times of India rated the film 1.5/5 stars and wrote, "Come on Bollywood. Grow up and give us a good sex caper".
