= Dil Ki Nazar Se Khoobsurat =

- Dil ki nazar se khoobsarat theme
- Created by: Sumeet Hukamchand Mittal; Shashi Mittal
- Starring: Rohit Khurana; Abhishek Malik; Soumya Seth; Urvashi Upadhyay
- Country of origin: India
- No. of seasons: 1
- No. of episodes: 105

Production
- Producers: Shashi Mittal; Sumeet H. Mittal

Original release
- Network: Sony Entertainment Television (India)
- Release: 25 February – 19 July 2013

Dil Ki Nazar Se Khoobsurat aired on Sony TV from 25 Feb 2013 to 19 July 2013. The story was mainly based on a triangle love story between Aradhya, Madhav and Rahul.

== Plot summary ==
Rahul and Madhav are childhood friends. As kids, Rahul enjoys success over Madhav who is average looking compared to the former. Aaradhya, a beautiful young girl thinks she is beautiful and deserves to be with a Prince Charming once she grows up.

At a school play, Rahul is selected as a prince over the more deserving Madhav but runs away on the final day. Madhav is asked to step in and an unsuspecting Aradhya calls him "Brown Boo" on stage and asks for her white prince. This experience leaves Madhav ashamed and he develops an inferiority complex.

=== 15 years later ===
Aradhya has grown up to be a beautiful woman. Rahul now owns a radio station named 93.6 Jhankar Beats and Madhav manages their radio station.

Aradhya and her friends are given the job to select a nice photo of their principal, Bharti Periwal, for a felicitation ceremony. They use Photoshop to make her look younger and more attractive but that move backfires. A scared Aradhya escapes the Principal's anger. Her sister advises her to take advice from the famous RJ Ehsaas. Aradhya instantly likes his voice and ideas. Aradhya vows to thank Ehsaas, whose real identity is a secret. It is later revealed that Madhav is RJ Ehsaas.

A series of events lead Aradhya to finally organise a meeting with Ehsaas on the pretext of giving him the recording of a rare song and a misunderstanding leads Aradhya to assume Rahul is RJ Ehsaas. Madhav furthers this misunderstanding and unknowingly Rahul goes ahead with the plan. Aradhya and Rahul's wedding is fixed but Rahul finds out the truth and confirming that Aradhya loves Ehsaas, he has Madhav marry Aradhya without disclosing this to Aradhya or their families. A shattered Madhav realising Aradhya didn't know he was Ehsaas decides to divorce her after a few months. However, Aradhya gradually falls in love with him and they decide to stay together. Meanwhile, Rahul falls in love with Madhav's sister Prerna who starts working him at the radio station. Soon, Aradhya becomes pregnant. As she goes into labour, Madhav dies in an accident. Soon after, Dr. Shekhar delivers her baby boy who also dies. At the same time Shekhar's wife delivers a boy and dies in child birth. A disheartened Shekhar decides to swap the babies to give Madhav's family and Aradhya a chance at happiness and decides to move away. Aradhya names the boy Ehsaas.

=== 5 years later ===
Aradhya has become an RJ keeping RJ Ehsaas' show alive and has been successfully managing the radio station. She is shown to have been trying to get in touch with Shekhar to thank him for delivering her baby but he has not been touch with them since Ehsaas was born. She finds hi back in town but he has become an arrogant doctor and behaves coldly towards her. Finally, he meets his son Ehsaas and they start connecting as Shekhar and Aradhya become friends. Meanwhile, Aradhya is constantly harassed by her business competitor Mr. Sandhu who wants to shut down her radio station.

As Ehsaas starts seeing Shekhar as a father figure, Bharti starts fearing he is getting too close to Aradhya and Ehsaas, Bharti develops an insecurity and is opposed to any suggestions of getting Aradhya remarried. She soon finds out that Shekhar is Ehsaas' biological father but decides to keep it from the family. When she files a false police complaint against Shekhar for trying to kidnap Ehsaas, he is forced to admit the truth before everyone. Realising Shekhar's sacrifice, a heartbroken Aradhya decides to drop Ehsaas off at his place but they are abducted on the way by Mr. Sandhu. Shekhar finds them and saves them. Eventually, Madhav's grandmother and Prerna convince Bharti that it is in the best interests of both Aradhya and Ehsaas to have Aradhya marry Shekhar and Bharti agrees. Aradhya and Shekhar marry as the family celebrates.

== Cast ==
=== Main cast ===
- Soumya Seth as Aaradhya Maansingh / Aaradhya Periwal
- Rohit Khurana as Madhav Periwal / RJ Ehsaas, an average looking radio jockey
- Abhishek Malik as Rahul Shergill, Madhav's attractive childhood friend and owner of the radio station
  - Divyam Dama as Young Rahul
- Sachin Shroff as Dr. Shekhar Periwal
- Kiran Khoje / Mitali Nag as Prerna Periwal, Madhav's sister and later Rahul's wife
- Urvashi Upadhyay as Bharti Madhusudhan Periwal, Madhav's mother

=== Recurring cast ===
- Sandeep Rajora as Lalit Maansingh, Aaradhya's father
- Roop Sidhu as Menka Lalit Maansingh, Aaradhya's mother
- Sheetal Dabholkar as Meghna Maansingh, Aaradhya's elder sister
- Nivin Ramani as Gaurav
- Shankar Sachdev as Madhusudhan Periwal
- Rishina Kandhari as Aaradhya Shekhar Periwal
- Pearl V Puri as Ajay Tiwari
- Preeti Amin as Anisha, RJ Ehsaas' fan
- Nikita More as Nimmi
- Farnaz Shetty as Tiya
