= King Uncle =

- Directed by: Rakesh Roshan
- Written by: Ravi Kapoor; Mohan Kaul; Anees Bazmee (dialogues)
- Produced by: Rakesh Roshan
- Starring: Jackie Shroff; Shah Rukh Khan; Anu Aggarwal; Nagma; Paresh Rawal; Sushmita Mukherjee; Deven Verma; Pooja Ruparel
- Cinematography: Nadeem Khan
- Edited by: Sanjay Verma
- Music by: Rajesh Roshan
- Production company: Filmkraft Productions Pvt. Ltd
- Release date: 5 February 1993
- Running time: 171 minutes
- Country: India
- Language: Hindi

King Uncle is a 1993 Indian Hindi-language action comedy film directed by Rakesh Roshan. The film stars Jackie Shroff, Shah Rukh Khan, Anu Aggarwal, Nagma, Paresh Rawal, Sushmita Mukherjee, Pooja Ruparel and Deven Verma. The film was inspired by the 1982 English film Annie that starred Aileen Quinn and Albert Finney, which in turn is based on the 1924 comic strip Little Orphan Annie by Harold Gray. The film was a moderate box office success and has since gained cult status, well-received by families and children. Both Shroff and Ruparel's performances received critical acclaim.

== Synopsis ==
Ashok Bansal (Jackie Shroff) is a wealthy industrialist, inspired by the British 'stiff upper lip' syndrome. Ashok hates poor people and works hard to become rich because his mother abandoned him and his two siblings for a rich man when they were young. In the process of acquiring wealth, Ashok has become an unbearable disciplinarian and neglects his family consisting of his younger brother Anil (Shahrukh Khan) and sister Suneeta (Nivedita Saraf). Ashok gets Suneeta married to Pradeep (Dalip Tahil) although she is in love with Kamal (Vivek Vaswani). Pradeep has an affair with another woman and abuses Suneeta frequently. Anil goes against his brother's highhanded ways, marries a poor girl Kavita (Nagma) and leaves the house.

Munna (Pooja Ruparel), a runaway orphan arrives at Ashok Bansal's house, initially creates havoc and eventually becomes the apple of his eye. When he takes her back to the orphanage she spills the beans about the warden's alcoholism. Based on Munna's suggestions he frees his sister from her abusive marriage and brings her home. He decides to adopt Munna and save her from the clutches of the warden and her criminal boyfriend (Paresh Rawal). Ashok mends fences with his younger brother, becomes a kind man, and adopts all the children from the orphange.

== Cast ==
- Jackie Shroff as Ashok Bansal a.k.a. King Uncle
- Shahrukh Khan as Anil Bansal
- Nagma as Kavita
- Anu Aggarwal as Fenni Fernando
- Pooja Ruparel as Munna, Orphaned girl
- Vivek Vaswani as Kamal
- Nivedita Joshi as Suneeta Bansal
- Paresh Rawal as Pratap
- Sushmita Mukherjee as Shanti, Orphanage Principal
- Deven Verma as Karim
- Dalip Tahil as Pradeep
- Bharat Kapoor as Mr. Mallik
- Madhu Malhotra as Mrs. Mallik
- Viju Khote marriage counselor
- Dinesh Hingoo
- Raj Kishore
- Deb Mukherjee as Ashok's father
- Kunickaa Sadanand as Ashok's mother
- Joginder
- Rajesh Puri
- Guddi Maruti

== Production ==
The title role was originally offered to Amitabh Bachchan however he declined.

== Soundtrack ==
The music is composed by Rajesh Roshan, while the songs are written by Indeevar and Javed Akhtar. The film's song "Taare Aasman Ke Dharti Pe" as well as some continued melodies through the movie are sampled from the whistling tune used by Roxette in their song "Joyride". A similar song "Tera Shukriya", from the soundtrack of Shah Rukh Khan's earlier film Chamatkar, not featured in the movie itself, also uses the melody. The original song from where the melody was borrowed was a Kenyan Song named Jambo Bwana by Kenyan band Them Mushrooms.

| # | Title | Singer(s) | Lyricist |
|---|---|---|---|
| 1 | "Akkad Bakkad Bumbe Bo" | Sudesh Bhosle, Alka Yagnik | Javed Akhtar |
| 2 | "Dil Maaane Jise Wohi Apna" | Kumar Sanu | Indeevar |
| 3 | "Fenny Ne Mujhe Bulaya" | Sudesh Bhosle, Asha Bhosle | Javed Akhtar |
| 4 | "Hum Rahe Na Rahe Yahaan Par" | Sadhana Sargam | Indeevar |
| 5 | "Is Jahaan Ki Nahi Hain" | Nitin Mukesh, Lata Mangeshkar | Indeevar |
| 6 | "Khush Rehne Ko Zaroori" | Vinod Rathod, Nitin Mukesh, Alka Yagnik, Sadhana Sargam | Indeevar |
| 7 | "Parody" | Sudesh Bhosle, Sapna Mukherjee | Javed Akhtar |
| 8 | "Taare Aasman Ke Dharti Pe" | Sadhana Sargam | Indeevar |
