= Ayush Mahesh Khedekar =

Indian actor (born 2000)

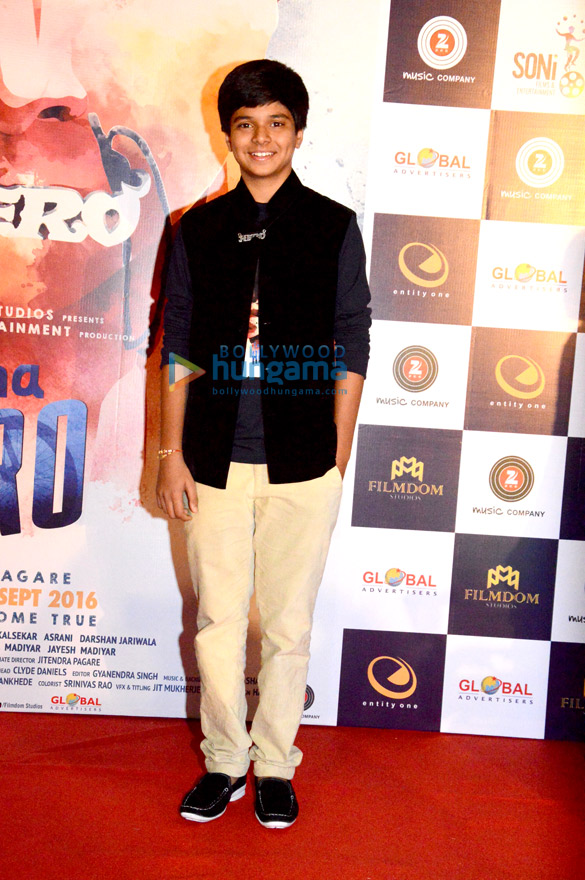
- Ayush Khedekar
- Born: 5 April 2000 (age 26); Mumbai, India
- Occupation: Actor
- Years active: 2008–present

Ayush Mahesh Khedekar (born 5 April 2000 in Mumbai) is an Indian actor, best known for playing the child version of young Jamal Malik in Slumdog Millionaire (2008), for which he won a Screen Actors Guild Award.

== Biography ==
Ayush is from Bhayandar, a distant Mumbai suburb, originally from Ratnagiri, KhedekarWadi and studies at the RBK School. His mother Sayali is a teacher in a Marathi medium school. His father Mahesh used to be a Marathi theatre actor, but he stopped acting after Ayush was born. Mahesh is currently an engineer with the Bombay Port Trust.

== Acting career ==
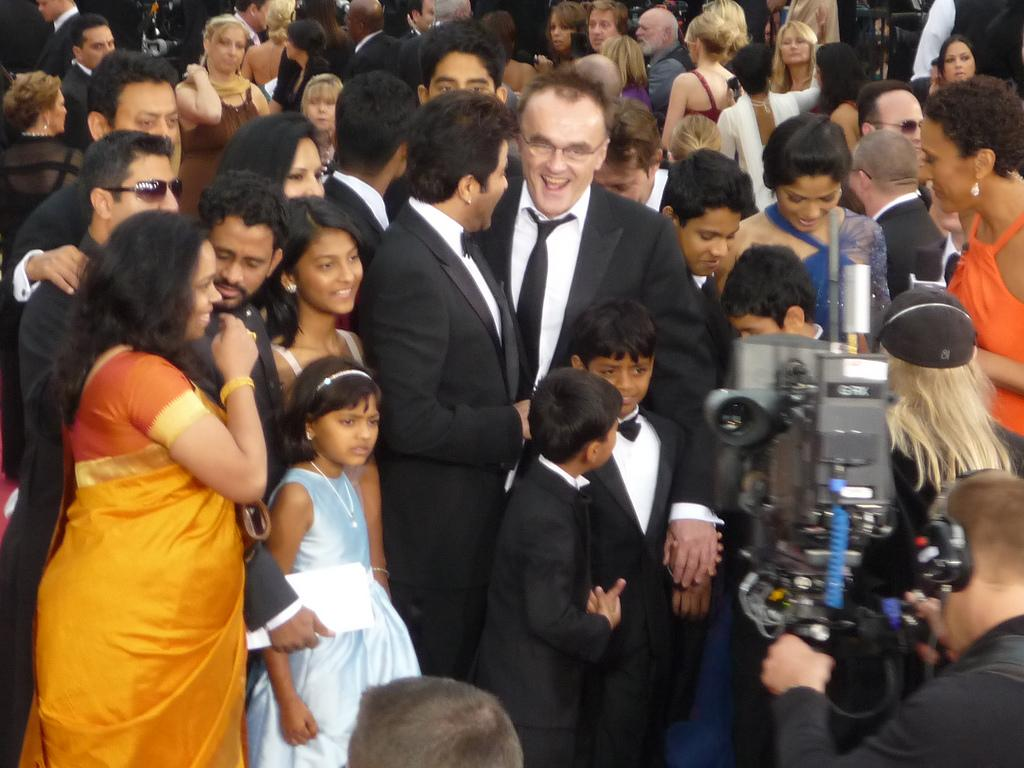
Slumdog Millionaire team at the 81st Academy Awards in the US

Ayush has been acting in India since age 4, appearing in commercials for Britannia, Colgate, Kelloggs and HDFC. He has also acted in television shows like Baa Bahoo Aur Baby, Kayaamat and Karam Apnaa Apnaa, and appeared in the Bollywood film Family.

He made his international film debut in Slumdog Millionaire (2008). His role won a lot of praise from audience and critics alike for his natural ability to act and his screen presence that makes up a significant portion of the film. His performance has earned him the 2009 Screen Actors Guild Award for Outstanding Performance by a Cast in a Motion Picture (shared with ten other cast members), and a 2008 British Independent Film Award nomination for Most Promising Newcomer. Ayush is also in Zara Nachke Dikha as a young dancer.

== Filmography ==
- Baa Bahoo Aur Baby, as Gullel.
- Slumdog Millionaire, as Jamal Malik.
- Fakt Ladh Mhana, as Pani Kam.
- Gandhi of the Month, as Varun Bapat.
- Jai Gangaajal, as Nagesh.
- Ek Tha Hero, as Jignesh.

== See also ==
- Slumdog Millionaire
- Jamal Malik (Slumdog Millionaire Character)
