= Rahil Tandon =

Indian film actor

Rahil Tandon is an Indian actor. His feature films include Like I love you, Men Will Be Men and Chal Pichchur Banate Hain written and directed by Pritish Chakraborty as the lead actor under Red Chillies Ent. and Twilight Ent. He has showcased his talent across the globe in a famous theatrical Bollywood Musical as the lead in the 'Bollywood Love Story'.
