= Navya..Naye Dhadkan Naye Sawaal =

Indian television series

- Created by: Vivek Bahl
- Directed by: Ravi Bhushan; Jeetu Arora
- Creative director: Prathyusha J
- Starring: Soumya Seth; Shaheer Sheikh
- Theme music composer: Vishal–Shekhar
- Opening theme: "Bekaboo" by Shilpa Rao
- Composer: Dony Hazarika
- Country of origin: India
- Original language: Hindi
- No. of episodes: 331

Production
- Producers: Siddhart Kumar Tewary; Gayatri Gill Tewary; Rahul Kumar Tewary
- Cinematography: Madhu Vannier, Jagtar S Mangal
- Editor: Varun Mehndiratta
- Running time: 24 minutes
- Production company: Swastik Pictures

Original release
- Network: STAR Plus
- Release: 4 April 2011 – 29 June 2012

Navya is an Indian television drama series that aired on Star Plus from 4 April 2011 and ended on 29 June 2012. It was produced by Swastik Pictures which starred Soumya Seth in the title role-Navya and Shaheer Sheikh as Anant in the lead roles. The song Dhin Tanna was sung by Supriya Joshi.

== Summary ==
The show narrates the fresh love story of college students Anant Bajpai, and Navya Mishra.

Amidst riots on Valentine's Day in Mumbai, Anant saves Navya from a goon. They further befriend each other in college and mutually begin to develop feelings. Their romance is hidden and they have to constantly keep sneaking in and out to meet and spend time together, as both of their families have traditional conservative values.

Anant is the grandson of Shankar Dayal Bajpai, a man of renowned religious fame and power, while Navya hails from a middle-class family from Kanpur. When the families find out about Anant and Navya, they disapprove of the alliance but ultimately agree to Anant and Navya's love and determination.

The Bajpais, however, continue to plot against Navya and try to prove her unsuitable for Anant. Seeing this, Anant and Navya leave the Bajpai house, and settle in a small flat, working two jobs to make ends meet and struggling with each other's busy routines.

The Mishras support the couple, and try to make Anant's parents realise his grandfather's schemes. Navya finally manages to expose the truth about Shankar Dayal Bajpai and his sister Saraswati, and even Anant's strict father stands up for Navya and Anant. Shankar Dayal apologises, and Anant and Navya finally return home.

== Cast ==
=== Main ===
- Soumya Seth as Navya Mishra Bajpai – Deepak and Meeta's younger daughter; Renuka and Harsh's sister; Anant's wife.
- Shaheer Sheikh as Anant Bajpai – Omprakash and Sugandha's younger son; Mohan's brother; Nimisha's cousin; Navya's husband.

=== Recurring ===
- Gireesh Sahdev as Deepak Mishra – Mrs. Mishra's son; Meeta's husband; Renuka, Navya and Harsh's father.
- Kshitee Jog as Meeta Mishra – Deepak's wife; Renuka, Navya and Harsh's mother.
- Unknown as Mrs. Mishra – Deepak's mother; Renuka, Navya and Harsh's grandmother.
- Shruti Sharma as Renuka Mishra – Deepak and Meeta's elder daughter; Navya and Harsh's sister; Gautam's ex-wife.
- Aayush Shah as Harsh Mishra – Deepak and Meeta's son; Renuka and Navya's brother.
- Ankit Kakkar as Gautam – Renuka's ex-husband.
- Ram Gopal Bajaj as Shankar Dayal Bajpai – Patriarch of Bajpai family; Saraswati's brother; Omprakash and Sanjay's father; Mohan, Anant and Nimisha's grandfather.
- Gargi Tripathi as Saraswati Bajpai – Shankar Dayal's sister; Omprakash and Sanjay's aunt; Mohan, Anant and Nimisha's grandaunt.
- Nagesh Salwan as Omprakash Bajpai – Shankar Dayal's elder son; Sanjay's brother; Sugandha's husband; Mohan and Anant's father.
- Hemaakshi Ujjain as Sugandha Bajpai – Savita's sister; Omprakash's wife; Mohan and Anant's mother.
- Rohit Bharadwaj as Mohan Bajpai – Omprakash and Sugandha's elder son; Anant's brother; Nimisha's cousin; Rama's husband.
- Snigdha Pandey as Rama Bajpai – Shagun's sister; Mohan's wife.
- Farooq Saeed as Sanjay Bajpai – Shankar Dayal's younger son; Omprakash's brother; Savita's husband; Nimisha's father.
- Muskkan Sayed as Savita Bajpai – Sugandha's sister; Sanjay's wife; Nimisha's mother.
- Shivani Surve as Nimisha Bajpai – Sanjay and Savita's daughter; Mohan and Anant's cousin; Ranbir's love interest.
- Vinita Joshi Thakkar as Ritika Joshi – Navya's best friend; Ranbir's former love interest.
- Farhina Parvez Jarimari as Appy – Navya's best friend.
- Rehan Sayed as Ranbir – Anant's best friend; Ritika's former love interest; Nimisha's love interest.
- Meer Ali as Harry – Anant's friend.
- Danica Moadi as Shagun – Rama's sister; Anant's ex-fiancée.
- Cheshta Bhagat as Sonia – Anant's former one-sided lover.

== Production ==
=== Development ===
The title track of the series was composed by singers Vishal Dadlani and Shekhar Ravjiani.

=== Cancellation ===
The series, due to its average ratings of 2-3 TVR, was finalized to go off air on 13 February 2012. However, when it slightly increased averaging 3 TVR while nearing the end, the channel, on audience request, cancelled its end in the last minute and shifted the series to an evening slot of 6:00pm from its prime slot of 10:00pm (IST) on 14 February 2012. However, it went off air on 29 June 2012.

== Reception ==
The Indian Express rated three stars and applauded the series as a fresh concept stating, "What works for Navya are its simple characters, especially the two protagonists. The tender moments between Navya and her father, the typical mother-daughter relationship or Anant's equation with his grandfather lends a warm touch to the show. The only hitch is its slow pace."

The series opened with a rating of 3.85 TVR in the launch week, occupying ninth position in list of the ten most watched Hindi programmes of that week.

The series in its runtime had an average rating averaged about 2 TVR and sometimes 3 TVR while airing at 10:00pm (IST). However, soon it saw a dip in viewership in the slot and when changed to the evening slot, it did not deliver expected ratings in that slot and thus was canceled by the channel on 29 June 2012.

== Awards ==
Years	Awards	Categories	Winners	Results	Ref
2011	BIG Television Awards	Taaza male	Shaheer Sheikh	Won	
2011	BIG Television Awards	Taaza female	Soumya seth	Won	
2011	Indian Television Academy Awards	GR8! Performer of the year	Shaheer Sheikh	Won	
2011	Indian Television Academy Awards	Best singer	Shilpa Rao	Won	
2012	Indian Telly Awards	Fresh new face (Female)	Soumya Seth	Nominated	
