= Zeenal Kamdar =

Indian Bollywood Film actress

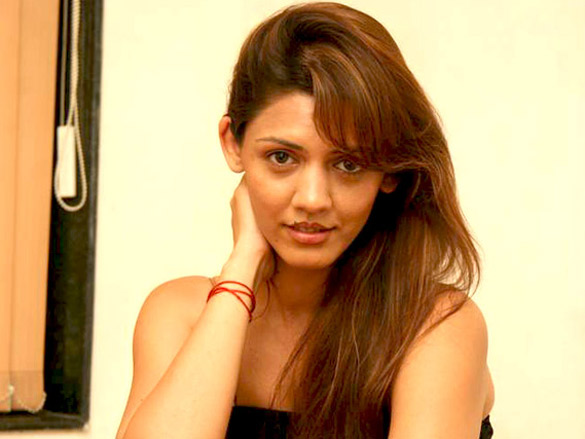
- Born: India
- Occupation: Actress
- Years active: 2010–present

Zeenal Kamdar is an Indian Bollywood film actress.

== Filmography ==
- 2016: 7 Hours To Go
- 2011: Men Will Be Men as Deepa
- 2010: Diwangi Ne Had Kar Di
