= Haal-e-Dil =

2008 Indian film by Anil Devgan

Haal–e–dil
- Directed by: Anil Devgan
- Written by: Dheeraj Rattan
- Produced by: Kumar Mangat Pathak
- Starring: Adhyayan Suman; Amita Pathak; Nakuul Mehta
- Cinematography: Rajeev Ravi
- Edited by: Dharmendra Sharma
- Music by: Anand Raj Anand; Vishal Bhardwaj; Pritam Chakraborty; Raghav Sachar
- Production company: Big Screen Entertainment
- Distributed by: Eros International; Reliance Entertainment
- Release date: 20 June 2008
- Country: India
- Language: Hindi
- Budget: ₹6 crore
- Box office: ₹72 lakh

Haal–e–Dil (transl. The State of Heart) is a 2008 Indian Hindi-language romance film directed by Anil Devgan, starring Adhyayan Suman, Amita Patak, and Nakuul Mehta. Mehta plays a painter named Shekhar, who woos Sanjana Sharma (Amita Pathak), but only to find she has a long-lost boyfriend, Rohit Bakshi (Adhyayan Suman), who she believes is no more. The film was released on 20 June 2008.

== Plot ==
While traveling by train, Shekhar Oberoi attempts to woo Sanjana Sharma but finds out she has given her heart to a former boyfriend, Rohit, who is no more. Both share some misadventures en route to Simla and upon arrival, Shekhar openly declares his love for her, knowing full well that this decision will bring nothing but heartbreak for him.

== Cast ==
- Amita Pathak as Sanjana Sharma
- Nakuul Mehta as Shekhar Oberoi
- Adhyayan Suman as Rohit Bakshi
- Tanuja as Mad Woman
- Himani Shivpuri as Stella
- Mukesh Tiwari as Speedy Singh
- Bharti Achrekar as Mrs. Ghosh
- Sanjay Mishra as Vigyapan
- Naseer Abdullah as Rohit's Father
- Kuldeep Sharma as Sanjana's father
- Vivek Shauq as Ticket checker
- Amey Pandya as Young Rohit

Additionally, Kajol and Ajay Devgn appeared as themselves in the song "Oye Hoye".

== Soundtrack ==
The soundtrack was released by T-Series on 17 May 2008. It consisted of 9 tracks composed by Anand Raj Anand, Vishal Bhardwaj, Raghav Sachar & Pritam.

=== Track listing ===
Track listing
No.	Title	Lyrics	Music	Singer(s)	Length
1.	"Haal-E-Dil – 1"	Munna Dhiman	Vishal Bhardwaj	Rahat Fateh Ali Khan, Shreya Ghoshal	7:39
2.	"Jeeta Hoon"	Sameer	Anand Raj Anand	Sonu Nigam, Pamela Jain	4:24
3.	"Agg Lage Aaj Kal De Fashion Nu"	Shabbir Ahmed	Pritam	Labh Janjua, Hard Kaur, Abrar ul Haq	3:48
4.	"Rang"	Aditya Dhar	Raghav Sachar	Sonu Nigam	4:27
5.	"Oye Hoye"	Sameer	Anand Raj Anand	Udit Narayan, Pamela Jain	3:55
6.	"Rani"	Sameer	Anand Raj Anand	Sonu Nigam	4:18
7.	"Khwahish"	Aditya Dhar	Raghav Sachar	Shaan, Sunidhi Chauhan, Raghav Sachar	4:34
8.	"Rang (Remix)"	Aditya Dhar	Raghav Sachar	Raghav Sachar	3:38
9.	"Haal-E-Dil – 2"	Munna Dhiman	Vishal Bhardwaj	Rekha Bhardwaj	7:06

== Reception ==
Taran Adarsh of Bollywood Hungama gave the film 1.5 out of 5, writing, "Really, if there was a 'RAZZIE' [it salutes the worst in movies] in Bollywood, the writer would've walked away with the statuette, stealing the march from contenders like TASHAN, JIMMY and HASTEY HASTEY."
