= Diwangi Ne Had Kar Di =

- Directed by: Jiten Purohit
- Produced by: Jiten Purohit
- Starring: Aditya Raj Kapoor, Deep, Ashhmita, Jeet Upendra, Zeenal Kamdar
- Cinematography: M.I. Shaikh
- Distributed by: Asheema Creations
- Release date: 19 November 2010
- Country: India
- Language: Hindi

Diwangi Ne Had Kar Di (transl. Madness has crossed its limit) is a 2010 Hindi romance film/thriller film directed by Jiten Purohit and produced by himself under the banner of Asheema Creations. The film was released on 19 November 2010.

== Cast ==
- Aditya Raj Kapoor
- Zeenal Kamdar
- Deep
- Ashhmita
- Jeet Upendra
- Baby Paridhi

== Soundtrack ==
Diwangi Ne Had Kar Di

Soundtrack album by Sandesh Shandilya
- Released: 2010
- Recorded: 2013
- Genre: Feature film soundtrack
- Length: 18:10

Sandesh Shandilya chronology
| Dus Tola (2010) | Diwangi Ne Had Kar Di (2010) | Yamla Pagla Deewana (2011) |

The music of Diwangi Ne Had Kar Di was composed by Sandesh Shandilya.

=== Track listing ===
| No. | Title | Singer(s) | Length |
|---|---|---|---|
| 1. | "Be My Love" | Sunidhi Chauhan | 3:52 |
| 2. | "Chhina Tune" | Sukhwinder Singh | 5:04 |
| 3. | "Diwangi Ne Had Kar Di" | Shreya Ghoshal & Kunal Ganjawala | 4:52 |
| 4. | "Nindo Me" | Shreya Ghoshal & Sukhwinder Singh | 4:22 |
| Total length: | | | 18:10 |
