= Ek Tha Hero =

- Directed by: Yogesh Pagare
- Produced by: Sachin N Dhakan; Amit Soni
- Starring: Ayush Mahesh Khedekar; Amita Pathak; Ashwini Kalsekar; Asrani; Darshan Jariwala
- Cinematography: Vishal Sangwai; Saurabh Moghe
- Edited by: Gyanendra Singh
- Music by: Monty Sharma, Sandeep Batraa
- Production companies: Soni films & Entertainment
- Distributed by: Panorama Studios
- Release date: 2023
- Country: India
- Language: Hindi

Ek Tha Hero is a 2023 Indian Hindi-language drama film featuring Ayush Mahesh Khedekar and Amita Pathak in the lead roles. Directed by Yogesh Pagare.

== Cast ==
- Ayush Mahesh Khedekar as Jignesh
- Amita Pathak as Janki
- Ashwini Kalsekar as Gomti
- Asrani as Gafoor Chacha
- Darshan Jariwala as Bade Babuji
- Rohit Sangwan

== Soundtrack ==
Ek Tha Hero

Soundtrack album
- Released: 3 March 2023
- Genre: Feature film soundtrack
- Length: 20:32
- Language: Hindi
- Label: Zee Music
- Producer: Soni Films & Entertainment and Filmdom Studios Pvt. Ltd

The film has 4 music tracks. "Cycle Meri Joike" is a fun song by Sandeep Batraa, Jui Parth Thakkar, Arpita Mukherjee. "Sapney" is a melodious track by Arpita Mukherjee. Divya Kumar & Sandeep Batra have lent their voices for "Aatish Hai Tu". A devotional track in the form of "Ganpati Bappa" by Sandeep Batraa, Monty Sharma, Neha Vaishnav add a rustic flavour to the album. Monty Sharma & Sandeep Batraa composed the music and Sunil Sirvaiya and Tanveer Ghazi are the lyricists. while Sunil Sirvaiya and Tanveer Ghazi are the lyricists.

No.	Title	Lyrics	Music	Singer(s)	Length
1.	"Cycle Mari Joike"	Sunil Sirvaiya	Monty Sharma	Sandeep Batraa, Jui Parth Thakkar and Arpita Mukherjee	05:05
2.	"Sapney"	Sunil Sirvaiya	Monty Sharma	Arpita Mukherjee	04:41
3.	"Aatish Hai tu"	Tanveer Ghazi	Sandeep Batraa	Divya Kumar, Sandeep Batraa	03:55
4.	"Ganpati Bappa"	Sunil Sirvaiya	Monty Sharma	Sandeep Batraa, Monty Sharma and Neha Vaishnav	02:56
5.	"Aatish Hai tu (EDM Version)"	Tanveer Ghaz	Sandeep Batraa	Divya Kumar and Sandeep Batraa	03:55
