= Bekhudi (2021 film) =

Indian romantic thriller film

- Directed by: Amit Kasaria
- Written by: Amit Kasaria
- Produced by: Vijay Bansal, Lalit Kumar, and Abhishek Tyagi
- Starring: Adhyayan Suman; Angel
- Cinematography: Sunita Radia
- Edited by: Protim Khaound
- Music by: Amit Kasaria, Rahul Nair, and Mishra Swaransh
- Production companies: Dreamspark Movies; Vijay Arts
- Release date: 29 October 2021
- Country: India
- Language: Hindi

Bekhudi is a 2021 Indian Hindi-language romantic thriller film directed by Amit Kasaria. The film stars Adhyayan Suman and Angel in the lead roles and supporting actors like Yuri Suri, Divya Seth, and Anurag Sharma. The story follows an affluent man who falls in love with a woman with a dark past, leading to intense emotions and unexpected revelations. The movie was released on 29 October 2021.

== Plot summary ==
Abhishek Oberoi, also known as Abby (Adhyayan Suman), comes from an affluent family and enjoys a carefree lifestyle. His life takes an unexpected turn when he meets Sania (Angel), a career-focused woman from a small town who has recently moved to Delhi to pursue her professional ambitions.

Though they are polar opposites, Abby becomes intrigued by Sania's indifference toward romance. Her aloof and mysterious nature draws him in, sparking an obsessive desire to understand her. As Abby delves deeper into Sania's life, he uncovers hidden secrets, leading to unexpected twists. As the story unfolds, Abby's growing obsession brings emotional turmoil, testing the boundaries of love and trust.

== Cast and characters ==
- Adhyayan Suman as Abhishek Oberoi (Abby)
- Angel as Sania
- Yuri Suri as Abby's father
- Divya Seth as Neeta
- Anurag Sharma as Sahil
- Dev Sharma as Rohit
- Gulki Joshi as Neha
- Hanif Memon as Vikram
- Jas Bhatia as Jas
- Zafar Khan as yogi
- Nishant Mallick as Shail
- Vijay Singh

== Reception ==
Archika Khurana of The Times of India rated the film 2 out of 5 stars, mentioning, "While Adhyayan Suman appears to be convincing as Abby, his junoon for Sania isn’t. When compared to his previous performances, Adhyayan has improved a lot."

Film Information critiqued the film, stating, "Amit Kasaria’s story and screenplay aren’t very convincing. Furthermore, they lack the entertainment quotient which the audience looks for in a film. In that sense, the drama fails to involve the viewers. Of course, there are turns and twists, but they don’t add up to make a wholesome and engrossing drama. Kasaria’s dialogues are ordinary."
