= Pooja Ruparel =

Indian actress (born 1980)

- Born: 21 November 1980 (age 45); Mumbai, India
- Occupation: Actress
- Years active: 1993–present
- Relatives: Bhavna Ruparel (sister); Sonakshi Sinha (cousin); Luv Sinha (cousin); Kush Sinha (cousin); Shatrughan Sinha (uncle); Poonam Sinha (aunt)

Pooja Ruparel is an Indian actress who appears in Bollywood movies and TV series. She is well known for her iconic role as "Chhutki" in Dilwale Dulhania Le Jayenge, one of India's most successful films. She has also acted in a number of plays, apart from being a stand-up comedian and a singer.

== Early life and education ==
Pooja Ruparel was born in Mumbai. She is Bhavna Ruparel's sister and Sonakshi Sinha's cousin. She completed her education in Mumbai and holds a master's degree in Industrial Psychology.

== Career ==
Pooja Ruparel started appearing in Bollywood movies as a child artist in 1993. She first appeared in King Uncle starring Jackie Shroff and Shah Rukh Khan, and gained nationwide popularity through her role as "Chutki" in Dilwale Dulhania Le Jayenge. Pooja has also acted in a number of movies and TV series ever since, including Amit Sahni Ki List, X: Past Is Present, 24 and Zabaan Sambhalke.

== Filmography ==
=== Films ===
| Year | Movie | Role | Language | Comments |
|---|---|---|---|---|
| 1993 | King Uncle | Munna | Hindi | Child artist |
| 1995 | Dilwale Dulhania Le Jayenge | Rajeshwari "Chutki" Singh | Hindi | Child artist |
| 1998 | Dil Se.. | Preeti Nair's sister | Hindi | |
| 2015 | X: Past Is Present | Ayesha | English; Hindi | |
| 2016 | Pela Adhi Akshar | Isha | Gujarati; English | |

=== Television ===
| Year | Title | Language | Role | Comments |
|---|---|---|---|---|
| 1993 | Zabaan Sambhalke | Hindi | Guddi | In episode 8 |
| 2005 | Baa Bahoo Aur Baby | Hindi | Falguni Ruparel | supporting role |
| 2005 | LOC - Life Out of Control | Hindi | | |

=== Discography ===
| Year | Title | Language | Composer | Comments |
|---|---|---|---|---|
| 1997 | Aakhen milanewale Remix | Hindi | Nazia Hasan | As girl in supermarket with Sameer Dattani |

== See also ==
- Cinema of India
