= Bittoo Boss =

2012 Indian film by Supavitra Babul

- Theatrical Release Poster
- Directed by: Supavitra Babul
- Written by: Gautam Mehra & Supavitra Babul
- Produced by: Kumar Mangat Pathak; Abhishek Pathak
- Starring: Pulkit Samrat; Amita Pathak
- Cinematography: Maneesh Chandra Bhatt
- Edited by: Abhishek Seth
- Music by: Raghav Sachar; Kumar, Luv Ranjan, Aseem Ahmed Abbasee (lyrics)
- Production company: Viacom 18 Motion Pictures
- Distributed by: Viacom 18 Motion Pictures
- Release date: 13 April 2012
- Running time: 116 minutes
- Country: India
- Language: Hindi
- Box office: ₹20 million (US$210,000)(net)

Bittoo Boss is a 2012 Indian Hindi-language comedy film directed by Supavitra Babul. The film features Pulkit Samrat and Amita Pathak in the lead roles. It revolves around a man who records videos at weddings.

== Synopsis ==
Bittoo Boss is a wedding videographer from Punjab who is young, charming, and ingenious. He calls himself a "sexy" video shooter. He believes in spreading happiness through the beautiful moments he captures and keeps watching them for years. He falls in love with an educated and strong-headed girl named Mrinalini (Amita Pathak), who makes him realize the importance of financial stability in order to gain respect and recognition. In love and smitten by the one he loves, the smart and righteous cameraman is lured into taking a shortcut to earn a quick buck and get his life back on track. What follows is a madcap ride.

== Cast ==
- Pulkit Samrat as Bittoo Boss
- Amita Pathak as Mrinalini Pariyar
- Fatima Sana Shaikh as Priya
- Ayush Mehra as Raj
- Rajendra Sethi
- Mohan Kapoor
- Ujjwal Chopra

== Controversy ==
The Central Board of Film Certification had rejected a promo of the film that was scheduled to release in April 2012. The producers are now left with no option but to redesign it and apply to the censor committee all over again. The promo of the film that shows everything through the lenses of a cameraman, has guests at a wedding asking the video camera guy to shoot them as well. Dialogues like 'meri bhi lo' (a shot, in this context) has irked the committee, urging them to reject the entire promo. Supavitra Babul, the debutante director of the film said, "I have been a camera person too. I have got many friends who have been shooting weddings in Delhi. I am well versed with the way people talk. It's all very cute. The film is about a videographer and the way he looks at things. I am surprised that the promo has been rejected for something like this." Kumar Mangat, the producer of the film informed, "The censor committee has completely rejected the song and the promo. It is an old folk song, which we have re-created for our film. But they said that they couldn't give us the certificate. We were ready to change it, beep it or even alter the words but it was a clear 'no' from their end. We were ready to accept cuts but nothing worked. Guess our film does not have big stars or big names to help us." The film was finally released with a "PG" certification, which became the first film in India to get the certificate. PG certificate allows children below 15 years of age to watch the movie in presence of a parent.

== Soundtrack ==
Bittoo Boss

Soundtrack album by Raghav Sachar
- Released: 12 April 2012
- Length: 37 minutes
- Language: Hindi; Punjabi
- Label: T-Series
- Producer: Raghav Sachar

Raghav Sachar chronology
Daddy Cool (2009)	Bittoo Boss (2012)

The movie album is composed by Raghav Sachar. Songs like Audi, Kick Lag Gayi and Kaun Kenda has made it very popular and they are hits. It received positive reception. The movie also has a sad number 'Mann jagey sari raat' originally composed by Gajendra Verma, treated by Raghav Sachar, sung by Shahid Malya & penned by Aseem Ahmed Abbasee. The song was well received & was appreciated for its melody & meaningful lyrics.

No.	Title	Lyrics	Music	Singer(s)	Length
1.	"Audi (Tenu Tak De)"		Raghav Sachar	Raghav Sachar, Natalie Di Luccio	04:09
2.	"Kick Lag Gayi"		Raghav Sachar	Raghav Sachar, Tulsi Kumar	04:46
3.	"Kabootar"		Raghav Sachar	Mika Singh	04:20
4.	"Kaun Kenda"		Raghav Sachar	Sonu Nigam, Shreya Ghoshal	05:00
5.	"Mann Jagey Sari Raat"	Aseem Ahmed Abbasee	Gajendra Verma, Raghav Sachar	Shahid Mallya

== Critical reception ==
The film received negative reviews. Taran Adarsh of Bollywood Hungama gave 1.5 out 5 and says "BITTOO BOSS has a fascinating premise, it appears bona fide as well, but not all concepts expand into entrancing fares. " Martin D'Souza from Glamsham gave it a 2 rating and said "A wedding videographer finally gets his pride of place in Bollywood. But this one is different. He believes in capturing moments that will spread happiness for a lifetime. Madhureeta Mukherjee of The Times of India called the film "a bit too much" and said "This one had the potential to be an entertainer, but turns out to be a 'bit-too' much" Jaidev Hemmady of Movie Talkies gave the film 3 out 5 stars and said, "Weddings, Video And Love! Bittoo Boss has certain sweet moments, viewers who were expecting a Band Baajaa Baaraat after watching the trailers are sure heading for a disappointing experience. " Kunal Guha of Yahoo! rated the film 1 out of 5 stars, saying, "'Bittoo Boss' is a bit too much of what the director believes works. It subscribes to the 'formula' with little thought to application. A bit too bore is more like it.
