= Raghav Sachar =

Indian singer, composer and film scorer (born 1981)

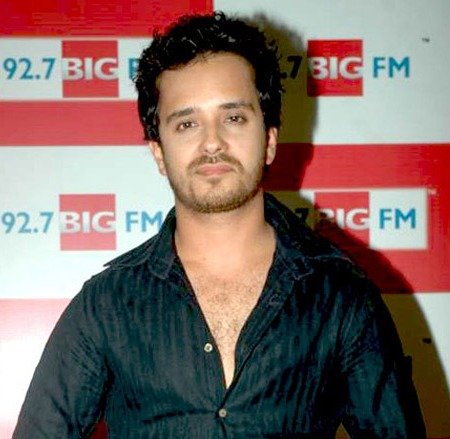
- Sachar at an event organized by BIG FM 92.7

Background information
- Born: 24 July 1981 (age 44); Kolkata, India
- Genres: Pop, playback singing
- Occupations: Singer-songwriter, music composer, instrumentalist, musician
- Years active: 2003–present
- Website: www.raghavsacharmusic.com

Raghav Sachar (born 24 July 1981, in India) is an Indian singer, composer and film scorer.

== Early life and career ==
Sachar was born to father, R. K. Sachar, and mother, Usha Sachar in Calcutta. He is the youngest of three children. He started playing his first instrument, the harmonica, at the age of four. Every year since then his parents have given him an instrument. Born into a family of music lovers, Raghav was interested in music from a very early age.

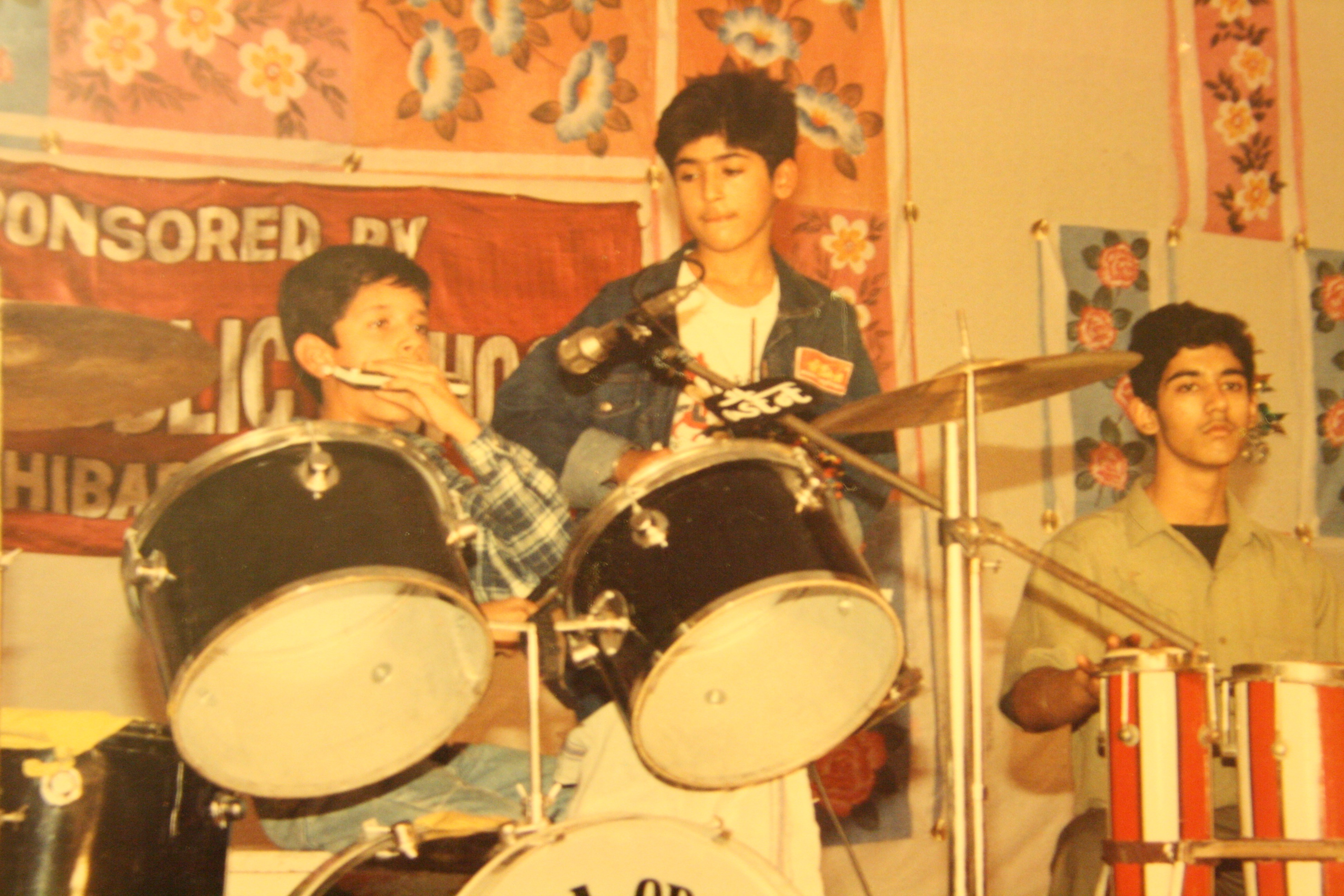

He won the Best Drummer Award at the Pepsi Cornucopia contest in Delhi in 1994 besides being adjudged the best keyboard player at the BITS Pilani Festival. At the age of 15, he was chosen by the government of India as their representative in Russia for a cultural exchange program. He also formed a band, Canzona, with some friends where they toured all over India and played at key places like the IITs, BITS Pilani etc. before proceeding to Monash Conservatory of Music, Melbourne in 2000 to study music. Raghav is an alumnus of Mount St. Mary's, Delhi Cantt.

He studied Music & Composition and Performance with the main instrument, the Saxophone and minor instrument being flute, and did his majors in Jazz at Monash. It was during this time that Raghav toured as a "One-Man Band" to countries in South East Asia including Taiwan, South Korea, Hong Kong, Singapore and Malaysia.

Raghav has also done affiliated courses from the Berklee College of Music, Boston and Trinity College of London.

He gave solo concerts while visiting India and worked with Viva and Shubha Mudgal on albums apart from recording for jingles for advertisements such as Coca-Cola, Pepsi, Sony Walkman etc. and film soundtracks. His crowning glory was being awarded the Golden Key Award and Earnest Award for academic excellence in 2000 and 2001 at Monash. He was termed as a Born Genius and featured in National Geographic’s Worldwide Television Series titled “My Brilliant Brain”. He has performed live for over 2000 public, corporate and private shows since 2003. Raghav now plays more than 33 instruments.

=== Albums ===
He released his first album "Raghav- For The First Time" in 2003 through His Master's Voice, followed by three other albums released through Universal Music in 2005 and 2007. Raghav's albums such as "24 Carat", "Play It Loud" and "Charming Lootera" enjoyed commercial success throughout India. "Vande Mataram" released in 2010 was launched by Hon'ble Ministers Kamalnath and Jaipal Reddy. 12 of his albums have been released under his own label "Raghav Sachar Music" (founded in 2009) between 2009 and 2015.

==== Raghav Sachar Productions ====
Founded in 2011, "Raghav Sachar Productions" tends to films, and live events and music videos.

=== Films ===
Raghav debuted as a music director for the film “Kabul Express”, by “Yash Raj Productions” in 2005. Since then he has composed songs for films such as "One Two three", and "Bittoo Boss" amongst many others. He also played numerous instruments in various Bollywood blockbuster films, such as, Salaam Namaste, Parineeta, Dhoom, Kaal, Hum Tum, Yehaan, Black Friday, Kal Ho Na Ho, Don to name a few. He has played in over 150 films till date.

=== Collaborations ===
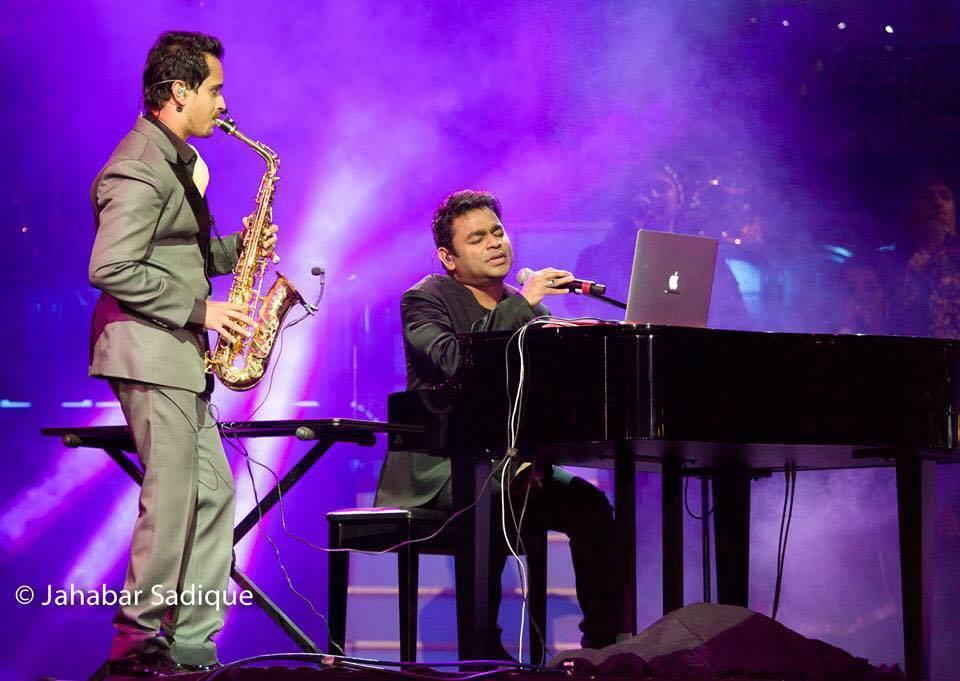
Performing with A. R Rahman

Raghav has collaborated with leading music directors such as: A.R. Rahman, Vishal–Shekhar, Shankar–Ehsaan–Loy, Salim–Sulaiman, Anu Malik and Pritam.

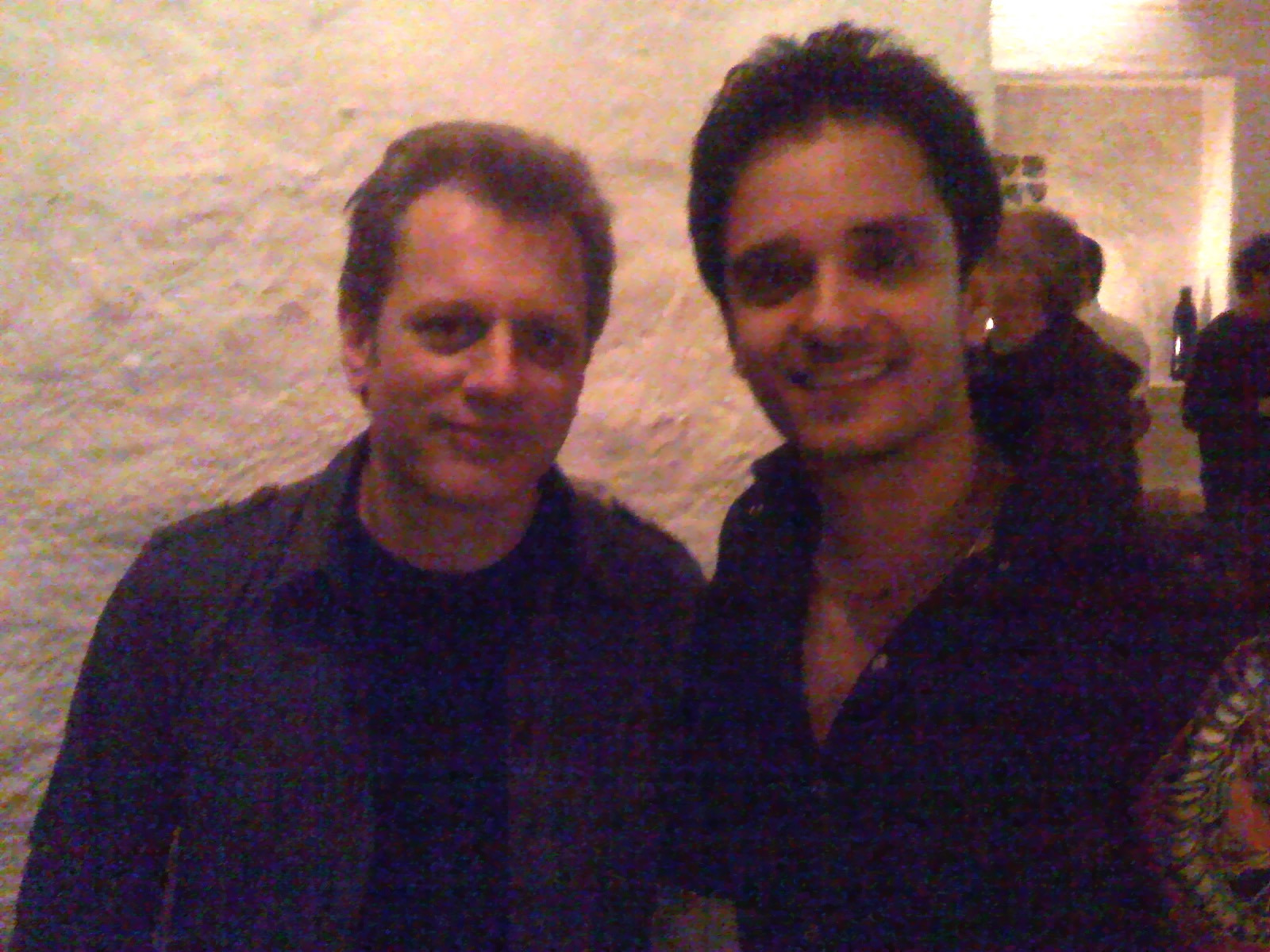
Raghav with Dave Weckl

He has also recorded and performed with leading artists such as: Dave Weckl (International Jazz Drummer), Sonu Nigam, Shreya Ghoshal, Sunidhi Chauhan, Kailash Kher, Shankar Mahadevan, Adnan Sami, Shubha Mudgal, Neeraj Shridhar, Kunal Ganjawala, Sivamani, Niladri Kumar, Taufiq Qureshi, Louis Banks, Ranjit Barot, etc.

=== Performing and other projects ===
- Performed for Satyapaul at Madam Tussauds (London) in 2004.
- Performed on behalf of Government of India as a Cultural Ambassador in Germany, Japan and UK in 2006–2007.
- Performed in a 26-city concert tour titled “Idea Rocks India” as their headline act in 2007.
- Performed at the Waldorf Astoria, New York for award ceremonies of overseas Indian community in 2007 and 2009.
- Performed live at the closing ceremony of Commonwealth Games held in Delhi, India in 2010.
- Performed live at the World Economic Forum held in Davos, Switzerland in 2011.
- Live performances at several fashion shows like Lakme India Fashion Week, Wills India Fashion Week, India International Jewelry Week (IIJW) to name a few.
- Several performances for various IPL teams like Mumbai Indians, Rajasthan Royals etc.
- Performed for a New Year's Eve event of Mr. Mukesh Ambani in Serengeti National Park (Africa) in 2010–11.
- Performed in UAE, Thailand, Malaysia, Singapore, Hong Kong, Kenya, Australia, USA among others for various Corporate, Fashion, private and public events between 2000 and 2015.
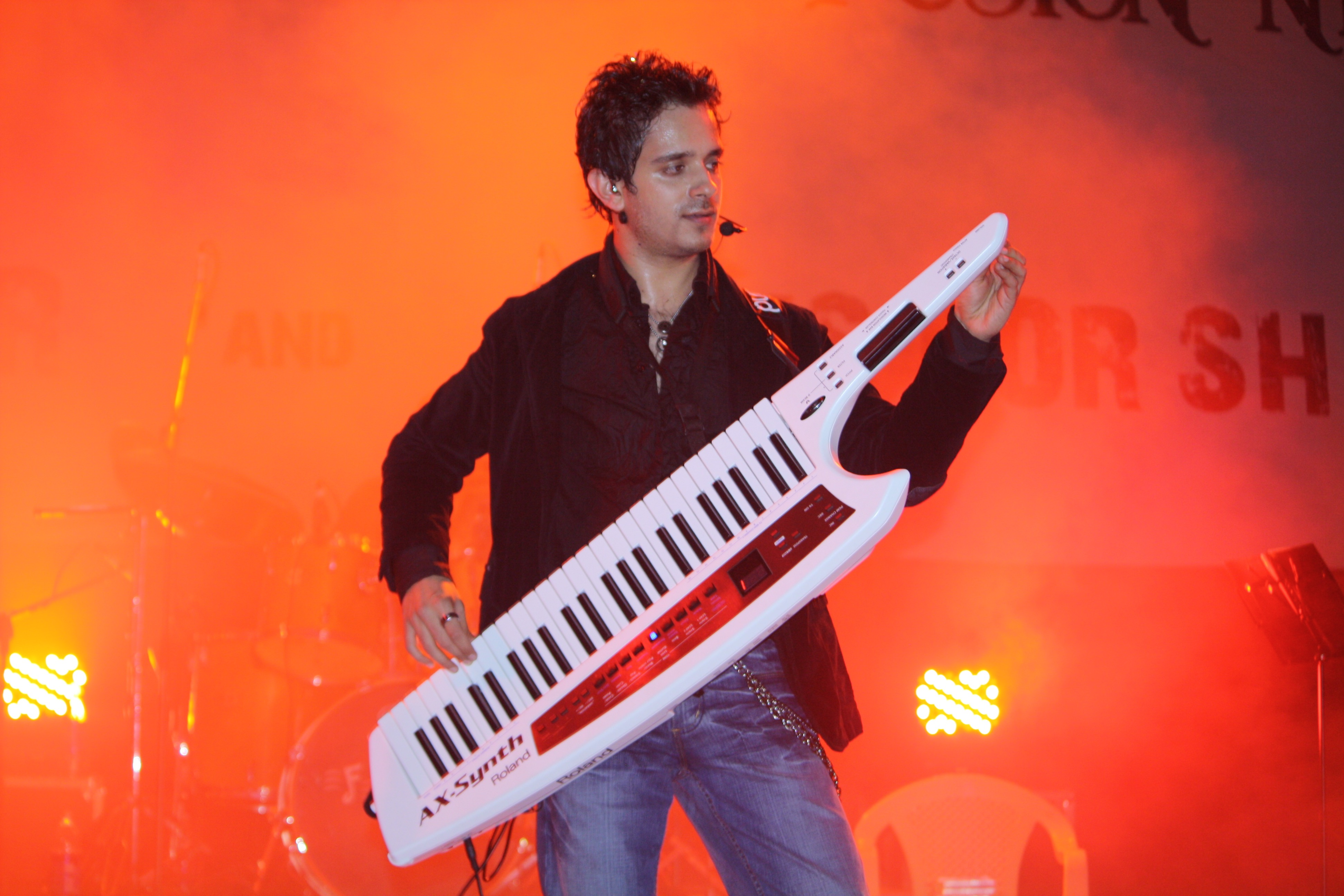
- Performed for various Product Launches of leading brands such as, Audi, Mercedes Benz, BMW, Toyota, Honda, Lakme, Wills Lifestyle, Provogue, Samsung, Blackberry, Nokia, Sony, Vodafone, Airtel, Google and Reliance to name some.
- Judged and appeared in numerous reality TV shows viz., Indian Idol, The Voice, Saregamapa, Little Champs, Fame Gurukul, Movers & Shakers and has had several TV interviews on all leading channels.

=== Endorsements ===
- Endorsed by the Leading guitar Gibson since 2010.
- Endorsed by Yamaha for Wind Instruments since 2012.
- By Samsung for Smartphones in 2012.

==== Brand ambassador ====
- Sony MP3 Walkman in 2006.
- For Kwality Walls Cornetto in 2010

== Personal life ==
On 21 January 2014 Raghav married actress Amita Pathak in Mumbai.

== Albums ==
Album title	Language	Year
Raghav, For the First Time	Hindi	2003
24 Carat	Hindi	2005
Play It Loud	Hindi	2007
Ho Jaane De	Hindi	2009
Charming Lootera	Hindi	2009
Om Jai Jagdish	Hindi	2009
Vande Mataram	Hindi	2010
Dil ki zubaan	Hindi	2011
Set The Fire	Hindi	2011
Gayatri Mantra	Hindi	2011
Ishq Ki Subha	Hindi	2012
Khoya Khoya	Hindi	2013
Gulabi Ankhen	Hindi	2013
Yeh Ladka Haaye Allah(Ft.Neeti Mohan)	Hindi	2014
"Raat Akeli Hai(Ft.Sophie Choudry)"	Hindi	2014
Bang Bang	Hindi	2015
Mana Leya Kar	Hindi	2023

=== Film soundtracks ===
Year	Film	Song	Singer(s)	Notes
2006	Kabul Express	"Kabul Fiza"	Raghav Sachar	
2006	Kabul Express	"Keh Raha Mera Dil"	Raghav Sachar	
2006	Kabul Express	"Yeh Main Aaya Kahaan Hoon"	Raghav Sachar	
2006	Kabul Express	"Kabul Fiza (Remix)"	Raghav Sachar	
2006	Kabul Express	"Kabul Fiza (Theme)"	Instrumental	
2006	Kabul Express	"Banjar"	Shubha Mudgal	
2006	Kabul Express	"Banjar (Lounge Mix)"	Sunidhi Chauhan	
2006	Kabul Express	"Banjar (Revisited)"	KK	
2008	Sunday	"Manzar"	Raghav Sachar	
2008	One Two Three	"One Two Three"	Kunal Ganjawala, Raghav Sachar, Earl Edger	
2008	One Two Three	"One Two Three (Club Mix)"	Kunal Ganjawala, Raghav Sachar, Earl Edger	
2008	One Two Three	"One Two Three (Ballad)"	Raghav Sachar	
2008	One Two Three	"One Two Three (Amalgamation)"	Kunal Ganjawala, Kailash Kher, Raghav Sachar, Kshitij Tarey, Kaptan Laadi, Aditya Dhar	
2008	One Two Three	"Rock Mahi"	Raghav Sachar, Sunidhi Chauhan	
2008	One Two Three	"Gup Chup"	Raghav Sachar, Mahalakshmi Iyer	
2008	One Two Three	"Gup Chup (Remix)"	Raghav Sachar, Mahalakshmi Iyer	
2008	One Two Three	"I Wanna Guy"	Sunidhi Chauhan	
2008	One Two Three	"Lakshmi Narayan"	Ninad Kamat	
2008	Haal-e-dil	"Khwahish"	Shaan, Raghav Sachar, Sunidhi Chauhan	
2008	Haal-e-dil	Rang	Sonu Nigam	
2008	Haal-e-dil	"Rang (Remix)"	Raghav Sachar	
2009	Daddy Cool	"Daddy Cool"	Paroma P. Das Gupta, Raghav Sachar	along with Adnan Sami
2009	Daddy Cool	"Daddy Cool (Remix)"	Paroma P. Das Gupta, Raghav Sachar	along with Adnan Sami
2010	Tum Milo Toh Sahi	TBA	Raghav Sachar	music by Sandesh Shandilya
2011	Phhir	"Love is All I Got"	Raghav Sachar	
2011	Phhir	"Loot"	Raghav Sachar	
2012	Bittoo Boss	"Audi (Tenu Tak De)"	Raghav Sachar, Natalie Di Luccio	
2012	Bittoo Boss	"Kick Lag Gayi"	Raghav Sachar, Tulsi Kumar	
2012	Bittoo Boss	"Kabotaar"	Mika Singh	
2012	Bittoo Boss	"Kaun Kenda"	Sonu Nigam, Shreya Ghoshal	
2012	Bittoo Boss	"Main Jagey Sari Raat"	Shahid Mallya	along with Gajendra Verma
2013	I, Me Aur Main	"Nasha Nasha"	Neha Bhasin	
2014	Sonali Cable	"Mausam Yeh Kyun Badal Gaya"	Kshitij Tarey	
2015	Alone	"Touch My Body"	Aditi Singh Sharma	
2016	Beiimaan Love	"Hug Me"	Kanika Kapoor	
2016	Rustom	"Rustom Vahi"	Sukriti Kakkar	
2016	Rustom	"Rustom Vahi (Male)"	Josraj Joshi	
2016	Rustom	"Rustom Vahi (Marathi)"	Josraj Joshi	
2016	Rustom	"Rustam Vahi"	Instrumental	
2017	Guest Iin London	"Frankly Tu Sona Nachdi"	Tarannum Mallik	
2017	Guest Iin London	"Dil Mera"	Ash King, Prakriti Kakar, Shahid Mallya	
2017	Guest Iin London	"Daru Vich Pyaar"	Taz, Arya Acharya	
2018	Helicopter Eela	"Ruk Ruk Ruk"	Palomi Ghosh	Remake
2018	Bhaiaji Superhit	"Om Namah Shivay"	Sukhwinder Singh, Raghav Sachar, Akanksha Sharma, Raftaar	
2018	Tina & Lolo	"Raat Ke Saaye Tale"	Akanksha Sharma	
2020	Taish	"Kol Kol"	Jyotica Tangri	
2020	Taish	"Kol Kol (Reprise)"	Mohan Kanan	
2023	Mission Majnu	"Channa Ve Assi"	Raj Barman	
2023	Mission Majnu	"Channa Ve Assi (Female)"	Jyotica Tangri	

=== Filmography ===
Title	Role	Year	Notes
Tum Milo Toh Sahi	Tharki Rockstar	2010	Special Appearance
