= Ishq Click =

- Directed by: Anil Ballani
- Written by: Rajeev Yogendra Nath; Niket Pandey
- Produced by: Ajay Jaiswal; Satish Tripathi
- Starring: Adhyayan Suman; Sara Loren; Keshav Arora
- Edited by: Hardik Singh Reen
- Music by: Ajay Jaiswal; Satish Tripathi
- Production company: Algol Films
- Release date: July 22, 2016
- Country: India
- Languages: Hindi, English

Ishq Click (transl. Love click) is a 2016 Indian Hindi-language romantic film, directed by Anil Balani and produced by Ajay Jaiswal and Satish Tripathi. It stars Adhyayan Suman and Sara Loren. The film is based on the life of a supermodel from Darjeeling who struggles very hard to become a top model and a photographer who helps her in her struggle.

== Plot ==
In Darjeeling, a girl, Sophie Dias (Sara Loren), struggles too hard to become a top supermodel, and during her struggle, she meets a photographer, Aditya Vardhan (Adhyayan Suman), who helps her throughout her efforts and also falls in love with her. The movie was released on 22 July 2016 and the promotion of the movie is done by Vedant Kumar Mishra Shamrock Communications.

== Cast ==
- Adhyayan Suman as Aditya Vardhan (Protagonist Lead)
- Sara Loren as Sophie Dias Vardhan (Protagonist Lead)
- Sanjay Gurbaxani as Indra Sengupta
- Keshav Arora as Dr. Tushar
- Sanskkriti Jain as Era Sengupta
- Raj Premi as Inspector Kadam
- Manas Srivastava as Advocate Manchandani
- Anjali Rana as Advocate Smita
- Sarita Patil as Nun
- Trilok Bhatia as Priest
- Yash Jaiswal

== Soundtrack ==
Ishq Click

Soundtrack album by Satish-Ajay
- Released: 2016
- Genre: Feature film soundtrack
- Label: Zee Music Company

The soundtrack singers included Ankit Tiwari, Mohammed Irfan, Nakash Aziz, Neeti Mohan, Amanat Ali Khan, Shalmali Kholgade, Hricha Narayan, Anamika Singh and Ajay Jaiswal.

| No. | Title | Lyrics | Music | Singer(s) | Length |
|---|---|---|---|---|---|
| 1. | "Mana Tujhi Ko Khuda" (Duet) | Satish Tripathi, Manisha Upadhyay | Satish-Ajay | Ankit Tiwari & Hricha Narayana | 4:00 |
| 2. | "Dhai Akhar" | Anoop Bajpal | Satish-Ajay | Mohammed Irfan | 6:25 |
| 3. | "Ishq Mein" | Shelly | Satish-Ajay | Neeti Mohan | 4:28 |
| 4. | "Kuhu Bole" | Shelly | Satish-Ajay | Shalmali Kholgade | 5:34 |
| 5. | "Mana Tujhi Ko Khuda" (Reprise) | Satish Tripathi, Manisha Upadhyay | Satish-Ajay | Nakash Aziz & Hricha Narayana | 5:36 |
| 6. | "Mana Tujhi Ko Khuda" (Solo) | Satish Tripathi, Manisha Upadhyay | Satish-Ajay | Ankit Tiwari | 5:36 |
| 7. | "Ka Dekhun" (Duet) | Shekhar Astitva | Satish-Ajay | Ajay Jaiswal & Anamika Singh | 3:31 |
| 8. | "Ka Dekhun" (Solo) | Shekhar Astitva | Satish-Ajay | Ajay Jaiswal | 8:21 |
| 9. | "Abhi Ajnabee" (Version 1) | Satish Tripathi | Satish-Ajay | Samira Koppikar | 3:52 |
| 10. | "Abhi Ajnabee" (Version 2) | Satish Tripathi | Satish-Ajay | Madhuri Pandey | 3:56 |
| 11. | "Ka Dekhun" (Unplugged) | Shekhar Astitva | Satish-Ajay | Amanat Ali Khan | 8:21 |
| 12. | "Ka Dekhun" (Duet 2) | Shekhar Astitva | Satish-Ajay | Avinash & Anamika Singh | 8:21 |
| 13. | "Mana Tujhi Ko Khuda" (Remix) | Satish Tripathi, Manisha Upadhyay | Satish-Ajay | Ankit Tiwari | 4:25 |
| 14. | "Dhai Akhar" (Unplugged) | Anoop Bajpal | Satish-Ajay | Amanat Ali Khan | 5:02 |
| Total length: | | | | | 1:17:25 |
