= Bhavna Ruparel =

Indian actress (born 1989)

- Born: 1988 or 1989 (age 36–37); Mumbai, India
- Occupations: Model, actress
- Years active: 2002–present
- Relatives: Pooja Ruparel (sister); Sonakshi Sinha (cousin); Luv Sinha (cousin); Kush Sinha (cousin); Shatrughan Sinha (uncle); Poonam Sinha (aunt)

Bhavna Ruparel is an Indian actress who appears in Bollywood and Telugu movies.

== Early life and education ==
She was born in Mumbai India. She is the younger sister of actress Pooja Ruparel and cousin of actress Sonakshi Sinha.

== Career ==
Bhavna Ruparel started appearing in Bollywood movies as a child artist in 2002. She appeared in Na Tum Jaano Na Hum, starring Hrithik Roshan and Saif Ali Khan. Bhavna made her acting debut as lead actress with the movie Chal Pichchur Banate Hain in the year 2012. She appeared as a "town girl" in 2013 opposite Aadi and Nisha Agarwal in Sukumarudu.

== Filmography ==
=== Films ===
Year	Movie	Role	Language	Notes
2002	Na Tum Jaano Na Hum	-	Hindi	Appeared as child artist
2003	Joggers' Park	-	Hindi	Appeared as child artist
2012	Chal Pichchur Banate Hain	Melrena	Hindi	Adult debut
2013	Sukumarudu	Devaki	Telugu	Lead role

== See also ==
- Nisha Agarwal
- Sukumarudu
