= Soumya Seth =

Former Indian television actress (born 1989)

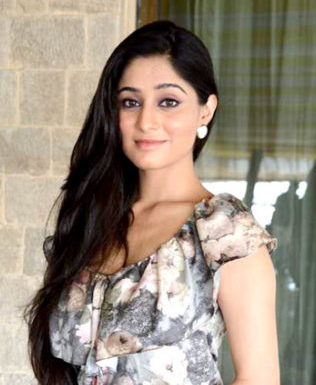
- Soumya Seth at the launch party of Yeh Hai Aashiqui
- Born: 17 October 1989 (age 36); Varanasi, Uttar Pradesh, India
- Occupations: Actress , Realtor
- Years active: 2007–2016
- Spouses: Arun Kapoor (m. 2017; div. 2019); Shubham Chuhadia (m. 2023)
- Children: 2
- Relatives: Krushna Abhishek (cousin); Arti Singh (cousin); Ragini Khanna (cousin); Govinda (maternal uncle); Arun Kumar Ahuja (maternal grandfather); Nirmala Devi (maternal grandmother)
- Family: see Govinda family

Soumya Seth (born 17 October 1989) is a former Indian television actress. She gained popularity by playing the role of Navya in the serial Navya..Naye Dhadkan Naye Sawaal. She portrayed the role of Kaurwaki in Chakravartin Ashoka Samrat. She worked in shows like V The Serial and Dil Ki Nazar Se Khoobsurat. She is the niece of Bollywood actor Govinda and the cousin of Krushna Abhishek.

== Early life and career ==
Soumya Seth was born on 17 October 1989 in Varanasi , Uttar Pradesh and later brought up in Mumbai, Maharashtra.Her father Kamal Seth is a businessman and mother is Annu Seth. Soumya has a younger sister Prakriti Seth and a younger brother Karthik Seth.

Soumya began her career with an appearance in the 2007 Bollywood film, Om Shanti Om, as one of the audience in Rishi Kapoor's dance performance.

She made her television debut in the Star Plus serial Navya...Naye Dhadkan Naye Sawal in April 2011. In 2011, she won the BIG Television Awards under the category of Taaza female for the show. She played a supporting role in the show V The Serial on Channel V. In the subsequent time, she was cast in female lead roles such as Aradhya Rahul Periwal on Sony TV's Dil Ki Nazar Se Khoobsurat. She came for an episodic role in Bindaas's Yeh Hai Ashishqui as Sara Hussain. She later played the role of queen Kaurwaki in the Colors tv show Chakravartin Ashoka Samrat.

Seth married NRI actor and filmmaker Arun Kapoor on 15 January 2017 in a traditional punjabi hindu ceremony held at the Westin Fort Lauderdale Beach Resort. After her wedding with Arun Kapoor , Seth permanently shifted to Virginia ,USA. The couple has a son named Ayden Kapoor born on 22 August 2017. Seth divorced Arun Kapoor in 2019.

Later, Seth married architect Shubham Chuhadia on 22 June 2023 in an intimate catholic wedding ceremony in Virginia.Soumya's sister-in-law is Shubhangi Chuhadia. In April 2025, Seth publicly announced on her official instagram handle that she was expecting her second child in July 2025.Later Seth gave birth to a baby girl and introduced her daughter Arya Seth in a post on her official instagram account.Currently Soumya Seth resides in Great Falls, Virginia,USA and is working as a Realtor.

== Filmography ==
=== Films ===
Year	Title	Language	Role	Notes	Ref.
2007	Om Shanti Om	Hindi	Dancer in a Group	Uncredited appearance	

=== Television ===
Year	Title	Role	Notes	Ref.
2011–2012	Navya..Naye Dhadkan Naye Sawaal	Navya Mishra Bajpai	Lead Role	
2011	Yeh Rishta Kya Kehlata Hai	Navya Mishra Bajpai	Special appearance	
2012–2013	V The Serial	Herself		
2013	Dil Ki Nazar Se Khoobsurat	Aaradhya Maansingh Periwal	Lead Role	
2013	Yeh Hai Aashiqui	Sara Hussain		
2013	MTV Webbed	Host		
2016	Chakravartin Ashoka Samrat	Kaurwaki	Lead Role	

== Awards and nominations ==
Year	Award	Category	Work	Result	Ref.
2011	BIG Television Awards	Taaza Female	Navya..Naye Dhadkan Naye Sawaal	Won	
2012	Indian Telly Awards	Fresh New Face – Female	Navya..Naye Dhadkan Naye Sawaal	Nominated	
