= Adhyayan Suman =

Indian film actor (born 1988)

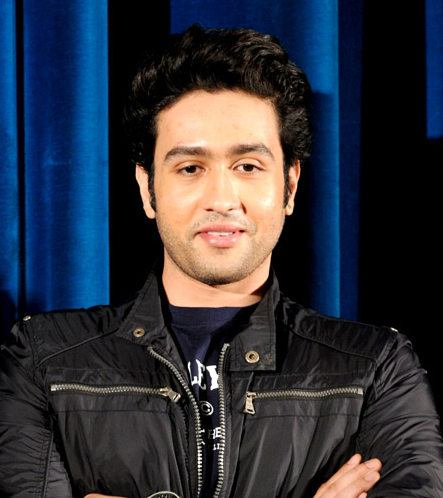
- Born: 13 January 1988 (age 38); Bombay (now Mumbai), Maharashtra, India
- Occupations: Actor; singer
- Years active: 2008–present
- Parents: Shekhar Suman (father); Alka Suman (mother)

Adhyayan Suman (born 13 January 1988) is an Indian actor and singer who appears in Hindi language films. He debuted in 2008 with Haal–e–dil. His second film, Raaz – The Mystery Continues, was a commercial success.

== Personal life ==
Suman was born in Mumbai to Bollywood actor Shekhar Suman and Alka Suman (née Kapur), a fashion designer. His elder brother, Aayush, died in 1995. His father publicly revealed that Adhyayan went through depression and had suicidal thoughts as Bollywood created numerous hurdles for him.

On 11 March 2021, Suman revealed that he broke up with Splitsvilla 11 fame Maera Mishra after being in a relationship for two years.

== Career ==
Suman debuted as an actor in Bollywood in 2008 with Haal-e-Dil which was directed by Anil Devgan and produced by Kumar Mangat. His second film was Raaz: The Mystery Continues, a semi-hit, directed by Mohit Suri and produced by Mukesh Bhatt. His third film Jashnn was also with Mukesh Bhatt and his performance in the film was critically acclaimed.

Suman's latest release was his father's failed directorial venture Heartless. It is a romantic medical thriller that explored the sensitive topic of anaesthesia and its awareness.

Pursuing a career in singing, Suman's first single was "Saareyan Nu Chaddeya". His last release was the recreated version of Arjun Kanungo's - "Aaya Na Tu", "Aaya Na Tu 2.0". Suman also announced his own music channel AS Music with the release of "Aaya Na Tu 2.0" and wants to assist talents across the globe in showcasing their talent and providing them with a platform which will guide them in producing their own music and making them reach out to the right target audience.

His recent release is Soniyo 2.0.

== Filmography ==
Year	Title	Role	Notes
2008	Haal-e-Dil	Rohit	Nominated, Filmfare Award for Best Male Debut; Stardust Award for Best Male Debut
2009	Raaz: The Mystery Continues	Yash	
2009	Jashnn	Akash	
2013	Dehraadun Diary	Akash Sharma	
2013	Himmatwala	Shakti	
2014	Heartless	Aditya Singh	
2015	Luckhnowi Ishq	Prem	
2016	Ishq Click	Aditya Vardhan	
2020	Love Birds	Ayaan	Nominated in Filmfare short film awards 2021
2021	Bekhudi	Abhishek Oberoi	
2022	Chup: Revenge of the Artist	Purabh Kapoor	
TBA	Madrasi Gang	Vikram Balaga	Post-Production

== Web series ==
Year	Series	Role	Notes
2020-2022	Damaged 2	Akash Batra	Hungama Play
2020-2022	Aashram	Tinka Singh	MX Player
2023	Inspector Avinash	Home Minister's Brother	JioCinema
2024	Heeramandi	Zorawar / Young Zulfikar	Netflix
