= Chal Pichchur Banate Hain =

- Directed by: Pritish Chakraborty
- Screenplay by: Pritish Chakraborty
- Produced by: Madanlal Jain; Twilight Entertainment Pvt Ltd
- Starring: Rahil Tandon; Bhavna Ruparel
- Cinematography: Hari Nair
- Edited by: Amardeep Singh Khichi
- Music by: Gaurav Dagaonkar
- Release date: 7 September 2012
- Running time: 115 minutes
- Country: India
- Language: Hindi

Chal Pichchur Banate Hain (transl. Come, let's make a film) is a Hindi family comedy-drama film, and is the debut film of writer and director Pritish Chakraborty. The film was released across India on 7 September 2012. The film follows Suraj, a young man attempting to break into the Bollywood film industry. The film was written and directed by Chakraborty, with music by Gaurav Dagaonkar.

== Plot ==
Suraj is a young man who wishes to break into the film industry. Despite having an MBA, a well-paid job, and the offer of work abroad, Suraj chooses to pursue his dream of working in cinema despite the lack of support from his family and friends. Beginning as a struggling assistant with no experience, Suraj hopes to work up to become a producer-director in Bollywood.

== Cast ==
- Rahil Tandon as Suraj Kumar, a young man obsessed with films who wishes to break into the industry
- Bhavna Ruparel as Melrena, the girl next door and Suraj's love interest
- Sandeep Sanchdev as Sadiq Khan, a veteran actor in the industry who wishes to make more meaningful films
- Dinesh Pandya as Sameer Kumar, Suraj's father who is unsupportive of his endeavours
- Smita Hai as Amrita Kumar, Suraj's mother who strongly believes in astrology
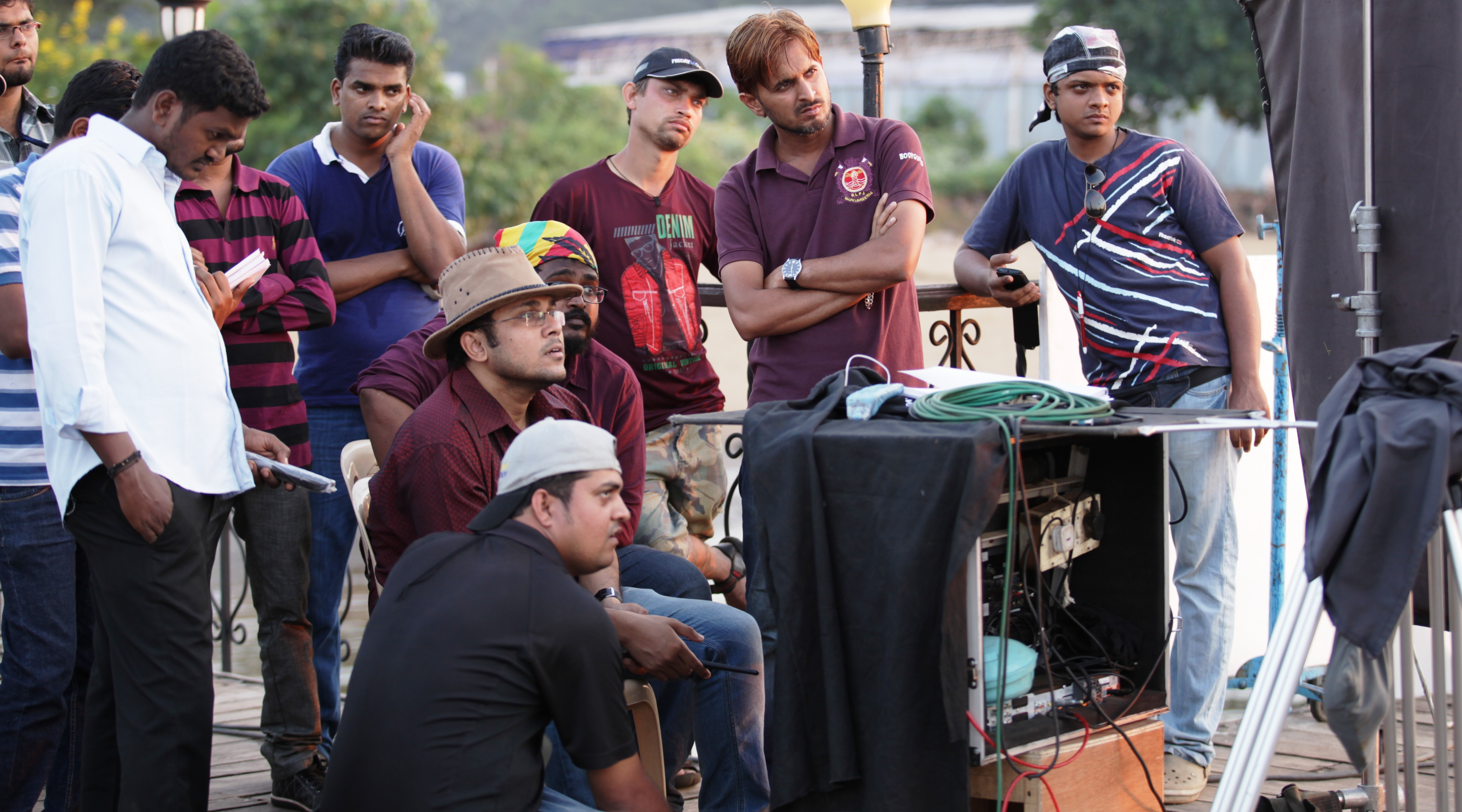
- Pritish Chakraborty filming on location in Goa
  Vipul Bhatt as Ramani, the film's antagonist and former family friend of the Kumars
- Reecha Sinha as Sadhna Kumar, Suraj's sister
- Errol Peter Marks as Nikhil, Suraj's childhood friend
- Aarif Sheikh as Shakti
- Shahnawaz Pradhan as Irani
- Muskesh Bhatt as Mansoor
- Pankaj Kalra as Khanna
- Vandita Shrivastava as News Reporter

== Music ==
1. "Baawra Mann" - Sunidhi Chauhan, Shaan
2. "Bas Tu Hi" - Javed Ali, Shreya Ghoshal
3. "Copy Paste" - Kailash Kher
4. "Its Time" - Suraj Jagan
5. "Main Gaa Loon Zara" - Gaurav Dagaonkar

== Critical reception ==
Martin D'Souza, of Yahoo gave the film a rating of 2.5/5, complimenting the idea behind the film and the way in which this was presented, but stating that he felt that a subplot was added after what he felt should have been the climax, to the film's detriment. DNA India editor, Kanika Sikka, gave the film an over-all negative review, noting that the score and the script were "not worth looking forward to" and "a let down", respectively. She did however, give some praise to the acting of both Tandon and Ruparel.
