= Pritish Chakraborty =

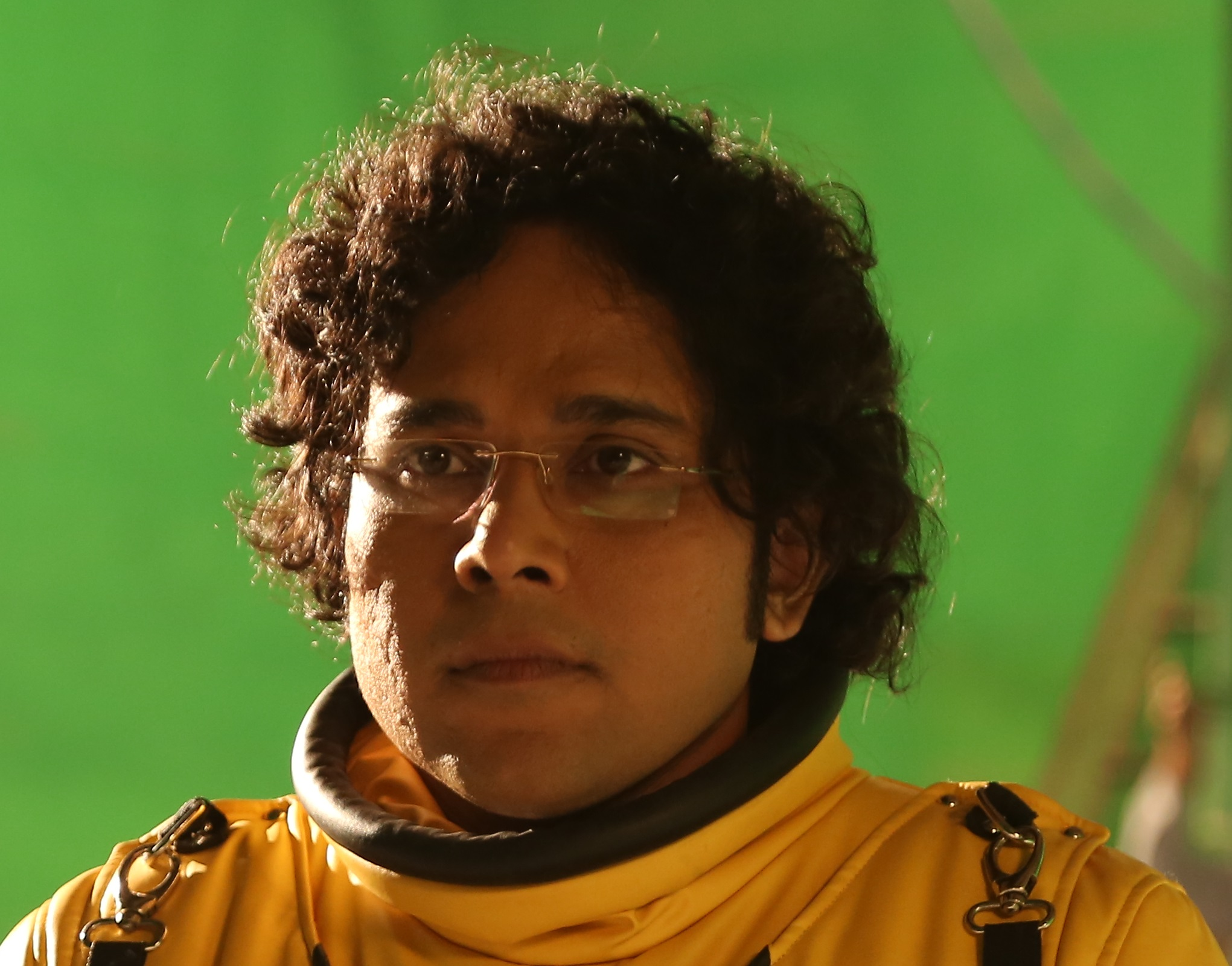
- Pritish Chakraborty at the shooting of the film Mangal Ho
- Born: 29 December 1984 (age 41); Kolkata, India
- Other names: Acharya Chakraborty Pritish, ACP, Chakraborty Pritish, Pritish, PC, Pritish S Chakraborty
- Occupations: film actor, film director, writer, producer, singer, composer, song writer
- Years active: 2006–present
- Known for: Mangal Ho, Chal Pichchur Banate Hain
- Parent: Sankar Chakraborty (father) Alo Chakraborty (mother)
- Website: http://pritishsc.wordpress.com

Pritish Chakraborty, also known as Acharya Chakraborty Pritish or ACP, is an Indian actor, director, producer, writer, singer, composer and songwriter. His Bollywood debut was as director–writer-lyricist with the Hindi film, Chal Pichchur Banate Hain (2012); his second, and first as actor-producer, is Mangal Ho, India's first Sci-Fun film set on Mars.

== Film and television career ==
In 2011, Pritish started shooting for his debut Hindi feature film Chal Pichchur Banate Hain as director-writer.

He founded his film production company in 2013 and started working on his next film script Mangal Ho. in which veteran comedians Annu Kapoor and Sanjay Mishra were amongst the first actors to be signed.

The first look Digital Motion Poster of "Mangal Ho" was released on the Indian Republic day, 26 January 2017 while the first look Teaser was released on 15 August 2017 on the Independence Day.

== Filmography ==
Year	Title	Role	Actor	Director	Producer	Writer	Singer
2023	Mangal Ho	Buddhi De	Yes	Yes	Yes	Yes	Yes
2012	Chal Pichchur Banate Hain			Yes		Yes	
