= Raaz (soundtrack) =

2002 Bollywood film soundtrack

- Cover featuring Dino Morea and Bipasha Basu

Soundtrack album by Nadeem–Shravan
- Released: 8 December 2001
- Recorded: 2001
- Studios: Tips Industries Studio, Mumbai
- Genres: Bollywood, Film soundtrack
- Length: 45:23
- Language: Hindi
- Label: Tips Industries
- Producer: Nadeem–Shravan
External audio
- Raaz (2002) Audio Jukebox on YouTube

Nadeem–Shravan chronology
Kasoor (2001)	Raaz (2001)	Dil Hai Tumhaara (2002)

Singles from Raaz
- 1. "Aapke Pyaar Mein" Released: 2001; 2. "Main Agar Saamne" Released: 2001; 3. "Itna Main Chahoon" Released: 2002; 4. "Jo Bhi Kasmein" Released: 2002; 5. "Kitna Pyaara Hai" Released: 2002

Raaz is the official soundtrack album for the 2002 Indian supernatural horror film Raaz, directed by Vikram Bhatt. The soundtrack was composed by Nadeem–Shravan with lyrics penned by Sameer. Released on 8 December 2001 under the label Tips Industries, the album became one of the most commercially successful Bollywood soundtracks of the year. It sold over 3 million units, ranking as the third best-selling soundtrack of 2002.

== Background ==
Following their major hits of the 1990s, composer duo Nadeem–Shravan collaborated with Vishesh Films on Raaz. The music was crafted to balance haunting romantic melodies with a sense of suspense, echoing the film's supernatural themes. Recording sessions were completed in late 2001, with leading playback singers such as Alka Yagnik, Udit Narayan and Abhijeet providing vocals.

== Release and Marketing ==
The soundtrack was released on 8 December 2001, a month before the film's theatrical premiere. Tips Industries heavily promoted the music on radio stations and television countdown shows such as Red FM and Superhit Muqabla. Music videos for key songs – particularly Aapke Pyaar Mein and Main Agar Saamne – received extensive airplay on music channels like MTV India and Channel V, boosting public anticipation.

Prior to its release, the film’s marketing engaged in bait-and-switch tactics, showcasing Bipasha Basu in the song “Aapke Pyaar Mein” but replacing her with Malini Sharma when the film released in February.

== Track listing ==
The Raaz (2002) soundtrack features a total of eight tracks, composed by Nadeem–Shravan with lyrics by Sameer. The album blends haunting romantic melodies with elements of suspense, reflecting the film's supernatural theme.

Most songs were performed by leading Bollywood playback singers of the early 2000s, including Alka Yagnik, Udit Narayan and Abhijeet. The songs vary from soft romantic duets like "Itna Main Chahoon" and "Main Agar Saamne" to solo tracks like "Aapke Pyaar Mein", which became an instant hit.

All lyrics are written by Sameer; all music is composed by Nadeem–Shravan.

No.	Title	Singer(s)	Length
1.	"Aapke Pyaar Mein Hum"	Alka Yagnik	5:28
2.	"Jo Bhi Kasmein"	Udit Narayan & Alka Yagnik	5:40
3.	"Kitna Pyaara Hai"	Udit Narayan & Alka Yagnik	4:21
4.	"Main Agar Saamne"	Abhijeet & Alka Yagnik	5:46
5.	"Itna Main Chaahoon (Not in the film)"	Udit Narayan & Alka Yagnik	5:21
6.	"Mujhe Tere Jaise (Not in the film)"	Udit Narayan & Sarika Kapoor	5:25
7.	"Yeh Sheher Hai"	Suzzan, Jolly Mukherjee & Bali Brahmbhatt	4:53
8.	"Pyaar Se Pyar Hum"	Abhijeet	5:30
9.	"Yeh Sheher Hai (Remix)"	Suzzan, Jolly Mukherjee & Bali Brahmbhatt	2:50
Total length:			45:23

== Reception ==
The Raaz soundtrack was a blockbuster success. According to industry trackers, it was the third highest-selling Bollywood album of 2002, with estimated sales of over 3 million units.

=== Critical response ===
Bollywood Hungama noted that the album "revived the early ’90s Nadeem–Shravan magic" and singled out "Aapke Pyaar Mein" as the standout track.

=== Chart performance ===
"Aapke Pyaar Mein" topped the Radio Mirchi Top 10 for several weeks in early 2002. "Main Agar Saamne" and "Jo Bhi Kasmein consistently" appeared on Binaca Geetmala charts.

== Awards ==
The soundtrack earned multiple nominations at leading award functions:

All music awards and nominations for Raaz soundtrack
Year	Award Ceremony	Category	Song	Nominee(s)	Result
2002	Star Screen Awards	Best Music Director	–	Nadeem–Shravan	Nominated
2002	Star Screen Awards	Best Female Playback Singer	Aapke Pyaar Mein	Alka Yagnik	Nominated
2002	Star Screen Awards	Star Screen Award for Best Lyricist	Aapke Pyaar Mein	Sameer	Nominated
2003	48th Filmfare Awards	Best Music Director	–	Nadeem–Shravan	Nominated
2003	48th Filmfare Awards	Best Lyricist	Aapke Pyaar Mein	Sameer	Nominated
2003	48th Filmfare Awards	Best Female Playback Singer	Aapke Pyaar Mein	Alka Yagnik	Nominated
2003	Zee Cine Awards	Best Music Director	–	Nadeem–Shravan	Won
2003	Zee Cine Awards	Best Playback Singer – Female	Aapke Pyaar Mein	Alka Yagnik	Nominated
2003	Zee Cine Awards	Best Lyricist	Aapke Pyaar Mein	Sameer	Nominated
2003	IIFA Awards	Best Music Director	–	Nadeem–Shravan	Nominated
2003	IIFA Awards	Best Female Playback Singer	Aapke Pyaar Mein	Alka Yagnik	Nominated
2003	Sansui Viewers' Choice	Best Music Director	–	Nadeem–Shravan	Won
2003	Stardust Awards	Best Music Director	–	Nadeem–Shravan	Won
2003	Channel V Music Awards	Best Romantic Song	Main Agar Saamne	Alka Yagnik & Udit Narayan	Won
2003	MTV India Music Awards	Best Album of the Year	–	Raaz	Nominated
2003	Bollywood Music Awards	Best Background Score	–	Nadeem–Shravan	Won
2003	Sansui Viewers' Choice Awards	Most Popular Song	Aapke Pyaar Mein	Alka Yagnik	Won

== Legacy ==
The soundtrack is regarded as one of the most iconic horror-romantic albums in Bollywood history. Its success played a vital role in popularizing the Raaz franchise, which later expanded into multiple sequels. Songs like "Aapke Pyaar Mein" and "Main Agar Saamne" remain evergreen, frequently featured in nostalgic playlists, reality shows, and concert performances. The soundtrack complements the film's emotional drama, romance, and chart-topping music, helping pave the way for horror films to gain mainstream popularity in Hindi cinema. Over two decades later, the Raaz soundtrack continues to be referenced in popular culture, inspiring cover versions, remixes, and live performances. Its songs are considered classics of early-2000s Bollywood.
