= Raaz (film series) =

Film series

Raaz series
- Directed by: Vikram Bhatt (Raaz, Raaz 3, Raaz: Reboot); Mohit Suri (Raaz: The Mystery Continues)
- Written by: Mahesh Bhatt; Girish Dhamija (Raaz); Shagufta Rafiq (Raaz: The Mystery Continues, Raaz 3); Vikram Bhatt (Raaz: Reboot)
- Produced by: Mahesh Bhatt; Mukesh Bhatt; Kumar S. Taurani, Ramesh S. Taurani (Raaz); Bhushan Kumar (Raaz: Reboot)
- Starring: See below
- Cinematography: Praveen Bhatt (Raaz, Raaz 3); Ravi K. Chandran (Raaz: The Mystery Continues); Manoj Soni (Raaz: Reboot)
- Edited by: Amit Saxena (Raaz); Deven Murudeshwar (Raaz: The Mystery Continues); Kuldip Mehan (Raaz 3, Raaz: Reboot)
- Music by: Nadeem-Shravan (Raaz); Raju Singh, Pranay M Rijia Toshi-Sharib (Raaz: The Mystery Continues); Jeet Ganguly (Raaz 3, Raaz: Reboot); Rashid Khan (Raaz 3); Sangeet Haldipur, Siddharth Haldipur (Raaz: Reboot)
- Production companies: Vishesh Films; Tips Industries (Raaz); T-Series (Raaz: Reboot)
- Distributed by: Tips Music Films (Raaz); SPE Films India (Raaz: The Mystery Continues); Fox Star Studios (Raaz 3); Pooja Entertainment (Raaz: Reboot)
- Release dates: 1 February 2002 (1); 23 January 2009 (2); 7 September 2012 (3); 16 September 2016 (4)
- Running time: 570 minutes
- Country: India
- Language: Hindi
- Budget: ₹790 million (US$8.4 million)
- Box office: ₹2.12 billion (US$22 million)

Raaz (transl. The Secret) is an Indian horror film series produced by Mahesh Bhatt and Mukesh Bhatt under the banner of Vishesh Films. The first, third and fourth films were directed by Vikram Bhatt, released in 2002, 2012 and 2016 respectively, and the second film was directed by Mohit Suri released in 2009. The first three films were financial successes but the fourth film failed to perform well at the box office.

== Overview ==
=== Raaz (2002 film) ===
The film starts with a group of college students enjoying a picnic in a beautiful forest in Ooty. One of the girls, Nisha (Mink Brar) in that group, dies after being attacked under mysterious circumstances outside a bungalow in front of the forest. She had also attacked her boyfriend, who, though injured, managed to live on. She was rushed to the hospital, where just before dying, her facial expression and voice changed completely for a short while, thus confusing all the attending doctors. Professor Agni Swaroop (Ashutosh Rana), who is supposedly an expert in phenomena involving the unexplained and the supernatural, is called by the police to look into the matter. Prof. Swaroop and the police visit the forest at the same place where Nisha was attacked and after investigating with Nisha's boyfriend, Prof. Swaroop declares that she was attacked by a spirit. He further reveals that this spirit has woken for some purpose and it will not stop until that purpose is fulfilled.

The story then turns to Sanjana Dhanraj (Bipasha Basu) and Aditya Dhanraj (Dino Morea) in Mumbai at a business party, where Aditya seems too busy to pay heed to the fact that his wife is longing to talk to him. She snatches the car keys from Aditya's pocket and leaves the party to return home. On her frantic drive home, she hears a voice in her head and loses control of the car. However, miraculously, she escapes the accident unscathed. After her recovery, Sanjana asks her husband for a divorce; Aditya, however, realises his fault and suggests a vacation to work out their problems. He offers Sanjana a trip to any corner of the world for some days and Sanjana chooses to return to Ooty (where their relationship first began) to save their failing marriage. In Ooty, they stay in the same bungalow behind which Nisha was attacked. Initially, the couple enjoys their stay at the cottage, but soon Sanjana starts experiencing mysterious things, such as hearing a woman screaming in the forest behind the cottage and the inexplicable falling of objects. She later learns that their housekeeper's husband, Robert, also used to hear strange voices from the forest, and that he ran from the house in fear once he could bear it no more.

=== Raaz: The Mystery Continues (2009 film) ===
The story starts with an American visiting the Kalindi Temple at night. There he sees the priest of the temple in a horrific state – he had slit his body with a scythe and had written 'Om' on his body. The man, horrified by what he is seeing, flees from there. The story then shifts to a model in her early 20s, Nandita Chopra (Kangana Ranaut), who is in love with Yash Dayal (Adhyayan Suman), a director and host of the reality show "Andhvishwas," a show dealing with various superstitions of two ghosts and tantric voodoo. Yash gifts Nandita an apartment where they start living and they love each other. In the meantime, Nandita gets pregnant.

One evening, Nandita encounters Prithvi Singh (Emraan Hashmi), an aspiring artist who is in search of his masterpiece. Prithvi tells Nandita that he made a sketch 4 months ago of a girl who is actually Nandita. He also shows her a painting where she is lying with her wrist slit. He warns her of any type of danger. Regardless, Nandita accidentally slits her wrist due to an unknown ghostly attack on her in the bathroom. Prithvi saves her and admits her to a hospital. Yash arrives at the hospital and learns about her pregnancy and also her miscarriage due to excessive bleeding. She complains to Yash about Prithvi, and Yash gets him arrested, though he is released later on.

=== Raaz 3: The Third Dimension (2012 film) ===
The story revolves around Shanaya Shekhar (Bipasha Basu), an ambitious actress who obsesses over her career. In addition, she also has a passionate affair with a handsome director named Aditya Arora (Emraan Hashmi). This all ends when a younger actress, Sanjana Krishna (Esha Gupta), makes her film debut. In place of Shanaya, Sanjana comes into the spotlight and begins to snatch away her awards. Suddenly, Shanaya seems forgotten and everybody only wants to work with Sanjana. Soon enough, Shanaya sees her career fading away and her envy slowly becomes craziness. She begins to turn to black magic and makes it her goal in life to destroy Sanjana's career and cause her the pain of loss.

She seeks the help of her uncle Sonu (Sunil Dhariwal), a tantrik who helps her to practice black magic and calls upon an evil entity, Tara Dutt (Manish Chowdhary). She asks him to make Sanjana's life a living hell. Tara agrees to help haunt and torture Sanjana until she becomes suicidal. He asks Shanaya to give her a black poison through a person she trusts. Shanaya seduces Aditya to do it for her and whenever he feels guilty, she makes him accept again. Aditya, whose sympathy for Sanjana has turned into love, leaves Shanaya and refuses to listen to her anymore. Now Shanaya must work on her own to defeat the power of love.

The film delivers the message of "Some people forget everything and run behind mere fame that gets destroyed by time. They do not know that the only thing that remains is the love that we have not just for ourselves, but also for our co-beings. That when we strive, not for ourselves, but for others, that Raaz (secret) is referred to as Life."

=== Raaz Reboot (2016 film) ===
On 1 January 2016. Rehaan Khanna (Gaurav Arora) and Shaina Khanna (Kriti Kharbanda) return to Romania after a few years of their marriage. Apparently, they lived there when they were unmarried. But when Rehaan got an offer as a Venture Capitalist for the Eastern European Finance Company, Shaina was insistent that he take up the job. Rehaan was reluctant; he had a secret to hide. On the very first day, while unpacking her luggage, Shaina experiences paranormal activities. Rehaan refuses to believe her. A month later, while on a business trip, Rehaan receives a frantic call from Shaina requesting help. She is found holed up in a telephone booth in a rural area. Apparently, she had gone there to visit a clairvoyant. And thence, the narrative juggles back and forth as to what plagues them and what leads her to the clairvoyant. The local priest cannot do much about it. The ghost knows the priest's past. So, a blind Indian student studying psychometry in Romania enters the game. Then, Aditya Srivastava (Emraan Hashmi, Shaina's former boyfriend), to rescue his lady love from the evil spirit. Aditya has some strange premonitions about all the events taking place in Shaina's life. He offers to help her fight the spirit and free his lady love from all the pain she is going through. Although Shaina does not believe him at first, a certain series of events makes her believe that the spirit has something to do with her husband, Rehaan. She finds out that he is keeping ‘Raaz’, which has now started to haunt their life. And in the end, it is found out that Aditya Srivastava, the real ghost whom Rehaan had killed previously to protect Shaina from his bad intentions.

== Principal cast ==
Actor	Film			
Actor	Raaz (2002)	Raaz: The Mystery Continues (2009)	Raaz 3: The Third Dimension (2012)	Raaz Reboot (2016)
Dino Morea	Aditya Dhanraj			
Bipasha Basu	Sanjana Dhanraj		Shanaya Shekhar	
Ashutosh Rana	Professor Agni Swaroop			
Malini Sharma	Malini Malik			
Emraan Hashmi		Prithvi Singh	Aditya Arora	Aditya Srivastava
Kangana Ranaut		Nandita Chopra		
Adhyayan Suman		Yash Dayal		
Jackie Shroff		Veer Pratap Singh		
Esha Gupta			Sanjana Krishna	
Kriti Kharbanda				Shaina Khanna
Gaurav Arora				Rehaan Khanna
Manish Chaudhari			Tara Dutt	

=== Raaz ===
- Dino Morea as Aditya Dhanraj
- Bipasha Basu as Sanjana Dhanraj
- Ashutosh Rana as Professor Agni Swaroop
- Malini Sharma as Malini Malik (evil spirit)

=== Raaz: The Mystery Continues ===
- Emraan Hashmi as Prithvi Singh
- Kangana Ranaut as Nandita Chopra
- Adhyayan Suman as Yash Dayal
- Jackie Shroff as Veer Pratap Singh

=== Raaz 3: The Third Dimension ===
- Emraan Hashmi as Aditya Arora
- Esha Gupta as Sanjana Krishna
- Bipasha Basu as Shanaya Shekhar
- Manish Chaudhari as Tara Dutt

=== Raaz: Reboot ===
- Emraan Hashmi as Aditya Srivastava
- Kriti Kharbanda as Shaina Khanna
- Gaurav Arora as Rehaan Khanna

== Inspirations ==
The first Raaz was an unofficial adaptation of What Lies Beneath.

== Release and revenue ==
Film	Release date	Budget	Box Office Revenue
Raaz	1 February 2002	₹50 million (US$530,000)	₹370 million (US$3.9 million)
Raaz: The Mystery Continues	23 January 2009	₹180 million (US$1.9 million)	₹380 million (US$4.0 million)
Raaz 3	7 September 2012	₹250 million (US$2.6 million)	₹1.011 billion (US$11 million)
Raaz: Reboot	16 September 2016	₹310 million (US$3.3 million)	₹360 million (US$3.8 million)
Total		₹790 million (US$8.4 million)	₹2.12 billion (US$22 million)

== See also ==
- Murder (film series)
