= Fear (2007 film) =

2007 Indian horror film by Vikram Bhatt

- DVD Cover
- Directed by: Vikram Bhatt
- Written by: Vikram Bhatt; Girish Dhamija
- Produced by: Ramesh Sippy
- Starring: Amit Gaur; Aditya Ralkar; Alisha Baig
- Cinematography: Pravin Bhatt
- Edited by: Rajeev Gupta; Sandeep Francis
- Music by: Himesh Reshammiya
- Production companies: Ramesh Sippy Entertainment; UTV Motion Pictures; Adlabs
- Release date: 10 August 2007
- Running time: 115 minutes
- Country: India
- Language: Hindi
- Budget: ₹2 crore

Fear is a 2007 Indian Hindi-language supernatural horror film written and directed by Vikram Bhatt. In the film, a man rescues an amnesiac woman and in the process of helping her regain her lost memory, they both find a ghostly spirit on their trail. Starring Amit Gaur, Aditya Ralkar and Alisha Baig, the film was released direct-to-video on 10 August 2007.

== Plot ==
Dev Malhotra is returning home when his car breaks down at night, and a mysterious woman emerges, seeking his help. He takes her to a friendly doctor's hospital who concludes she has lost her memory. While in the hospital, the woman is terrorized by a spirit. Worried and concerned, especially since no family members responded to the woman's missing poster, Dev takes her home and names her Anamika (meaning an anonymous woman), introducing her to his maid and mother figure Shantabai. However, the spirit does not stop pursuing Anamika and terrorizes her once again. This prompts Shantabai to take Anamika to a blind woman named Kesar Ma, who deals with the occult. When she tries to interact with the spirit at midnight, the spirit possesses Kesar Ma's daughter Guddi and tries to strangle Anamika, before being interrupted. Dev refuses to believe in the occult but decides to help Anamika, and along with Kesar Ma, they meet Niranjan Baba, an exorcist who baits the spirit into a mirror by instructing Anamika to recite hymns and thereby force the spirit to enter a corpse in defense. When this happens, it chases after Anamika and is lured into the mirror dimension. The exorcist covers the mirror with a cloth, smashes it to pieces and gets it submerged into water. With the spirit gone, Anamika and Dev confess their love for each other and Dev leaves to meet his parents and talk about their marriage. However, Anamika returns home and meets Rajat Saxena, who claims her to be his wife Sanjana.

Rajat takes her home and reveals that Sanjana had a miscarriage, which she blamed on him before he left for London, and since she had been staying at her friends' homes at night every time after quarrelling, he did not suspect anything wrong. On the other hand, Dev returns home and tells Shantabai that his parents have agreed for the marriage, before she reveals Sanjana has been taken away by her husband. A drunken man unwittingly frees the spirit, mistaking the pot containing the mirror pieces to be money. The spirit terrorizes Sanjana once again and tries to drown her in the swimming pool, before Rajat rescues her. However, she refuses to divulge anything about the spirit. Dev meets her at a restaurant and supports her decision to return home, but also becomes aware that the spirit is back and since it is connected to her past, she needs to find evidence at her husband's home. In the process of doing so, she is led to the trunk of a car containing Rajat's wristwatch and finds blood dripping from the ceiling with "murder" writing in blood. Rajat finds her and asks her to hand over his watch, leading Sanjana to believe him to be a murderer. Rajat admits that a murder did indeed take place in the house, but the murderer was Sanjana and the victim was his friend Rocky who manipulated Sanjana sexually. Once she found out, Sanjana ended up stabbing him to death in a scuffle before contacting Rajat and leaving away in her car. Rajat shoved the corpse in his car's trunk, during which the watch eventually dropped inside.

Besides Dev, Sanjana tells about this to Kesar Ma, who deduces that the spirit wanted Sanjana to be aware of what she had done, and now she must reach a Kali temple by passing through a maze-like tunnel and take a dip in the lake near the temple, which will free her from the spirit's clutches. Sanjana passes out, and possessed by the spirit, reaches her house where she discovers that Rajat's story was a lie; he cheated on his wife Neha with her and killed her when she confronted him regarding the same. Since Neha couldn't swim, she died by drowning, following which Rajat hid her corpse in the tank of Sanjana's house. Back to the present, Rajat, obsessively in love with Sanjana, abducts her but Neha helps free Sanjana and disguised as her, lures Rajat into an abandoned house. She wounds and sets him on fire, and having survived the death trap set by Rajat, Dev and Kesar Ma arrive to witness the spirit of Neha to smilingly depart.

== Cast ==
- Amit Gaur as Dev Malhotra
- Aditya Ralkar as Rajat Saxena
- Alisha Baig as Anamika
- Kiran Juneja as Kesar Ma
- Avtar Gill as Inspector Anand Kapoor
- Kishori Shahane as Shantabai
- Tanvi Uday as Sunil
- Vishwas as Doctor
- Gauri Karnik as Sarita
- Ajay Jadhav as Avinash
- Dibyendu Bhattacharya as Pradeep Sinha
- Mohit Adlakha as Sudesh

== Soundtrack ==
Fear

Soundtrack album by Himesh Reshammiya
- Released: 30 June 2007
- Recorded: 2007
- Venue: Mumbai
- Genre: Feature film soundtrack
- Length: 35 minutes
- Language: Hindi
- Label: Saregama
- Producer: Himesh Reshammiya

The soundtrack was released on 30 June 2007. All lyrics have been penned by Sameer Anjaan.

No.	Title	Singer(s)	Length
1.	"Tu Hai Ishq"	Sonu Nigam, Udit Narayan, Alka Yagnik	5:04
2.	"Dil Dhadkata Hai" (Male)	Kunal Ganjawala	5:53
3.	"Dil Dhadkata Hai" (Female)	Gayatri Iyer	5:51
4.	"Dil Ki Daro Deewaar Pe"	Udit Narayan, Alka Yagnik	5:13
5.	"Tanha Tanha"	Himesh Reshammiya	5:28
6.	"Fear"	Sunidhi Chauhan	4:11
7.	"Tanha Tanha" (Club Mix)	Himesh Reshammiya	3:50

Reception

Joginder Tuteja from Bollywood Hungama gave the album 1.5 stars out of 5, comparing it unfavorably to the soundtrack of Vikram Bhatt's previous horror film Raaz and claiming it would not make an impact as opposed to Bhatt's claim that the soundtrack would "haunt people for centuries."

== Release ==
The film skipped a theatrical release and went on to premiere on DVD as well as online on 10 August 2007 across the websites of Rajshri Productions, Bigflicks.com and Indya On Demand on 10 August 2007.

== See also ==
- 1920: Evil Returns, another Vikram Bhatt horror film where the protagonist brings home an amnesiac woman and helps her fight off a ghostly spirit on her trail.
