= Raaz: The Mystery Continues =

2009 Indian film by Mohit Suri

- Theatrical release poster
- Directed by: Mohit Suri
- Written by: Shagufta Rafique
- Story by: Mohit Suri
- Produced by: Mahesh Bhatt
- Starring: Emraan Hashmi; Kangana Ranaut; Adhyayan Suman; Jackie Shroff
- Cinematography: Ravi Walia
- Edited by: Devendra Murudeshwar
- Music by: Songs: Raju Singh; Shaarib–Toshi; Pranay M. Rijia; Gourov Dasgupta; Score: Raju Singh
- Production company: Vishesh Films
- Distributed by: SPE Films India
- Release date: 23 January 2009
- Running time: 151 minutes
- Country: India
- Language: Hindi
- Budget: ₹18 crore
- Box office: ₹38.09 crore

Raaz: The Mystery Continues, shortened as RTMC or Raaz 2, (English: Secret: The Mystery Continues) is a 2009 Indian Hindi-language supernatural horror film directed by Mohit Suri. The film stars Emraan Hashmi, Kangana Ranaut, Adhyayan Suman, and Jackie Shroff. It is the second installment in the Raaz series, but is considered a standalone sequel to the 2002 film Raaz. In it, an artist named Prithvi has the ability to paint the future. His paintings tell model Nandita's future and predicts her death.

The film was released on 23 January 2009. It received mixed reviews from critics, with praise towards the performances and music, but criticism for its pacing. Made on a budget of ₹18 crore (equivalent to ₹49 crore or US$5.3 million in 2026), the film earned ₹38.09 crore (equivalent to ₹105 crore or US$11 million in 2026) worldwide and emerged as a commercial success. A third installment was released in 2013 with Emraan Hashmi in the lead. It was first in a series of quasi-sequels released under the Bhatt Banner, including Murder 2, Jannat 2, Jism 2, Raaz 3D and 1920: Evil Returns, each of which are standalone sequels.

== Plot ==
An American named David Cooper visits the Kalindi Temple. He finds the priest in a horrific state – his body is slit with a scythe and 'Om' is carved into his chest.

The story shifts to model Nandita, who is dating Yash, the director and host of a reality show about the superstitions of ghosts. Yash and Nandita start living together and Nandita gets pregnant.

One evening, Nandita encounters Prithvi, an aspiring artist. Prithvi seems shocked to see her. It's revealed that he'd drawn a sketch months earlier of Nandita, but had never considered that she was a real person. He shows her a painting where she is lying with her wrist slit, and warns her of danger. Nandita accidentally slits her wrist after a ghostly attack in the bathroom and Prithvi saves her. Yash learns of her pregnancy and miscarriage. He gets Prithvi arrested, though he is later released.

Meanwhile, David, the owner of a chemical plant, hangs himself after writing in Hindi the words "You are impure, you are rotten from the inside" with his blood. Prithvi sees Nandita becoming possessed at her fashion show and attacking a spiritual guru in the audience. She recites the same lines that David wrote. Yash has Nandita publicly apologise to save their reputations.

Nandita goes to Prithvi for help. He shows her a new painting in which she is hanging herself with the same lines written behind her. At a party, Nandita becomes possessed again. Prithvi sees her rise in the air, hanging there after writing the lines with her blood. He intervenes when she tries to kill herself.

Yash agrees to help Nandita on the condition she leaves Prithvi, but she is hurt that he is more concerned for his reputation and decides to stay with Prithvi, who says they may find the truth in Kalindi. They stop at a guesthouse for the night, where Nandita is attacked by ghosts in a forest. Prithvi saves her before she falls off a cliff. They arrive at Kalindi and meet the priest's wife, who tells them that her husband was evil and his death was not surprising, considering the crimes he had committed against innocent people. They visit the house of the police officer who investigated David's suicide but find him unstable; he commits suicide after yelling that Nandita is the cause of all this.

One night while travelling, their car is attacked by wild bulls. Nandita finds a well in the trees. In a trance, she jumps in and Prithvi dives in with a rope to save her. Inside the well, she tells Prithvi that "he" has shown her the truth: it was Prithvi's father, Veer Pratap Singh, who'd been possessing her. Veer had discovered that the Kalindi chemical plant were dumping its toxins into the where thousands gathered once a year to bathe in a sacred ritual, but was warned by the policeman and the priest against taking action. Veer merely replied, "You are impure, you are rotten from inside." He tried to get the truth out but was killed by the priest and policeman before he fell into the same well. His spirit has returned for revenge; he killed David and the policeman and the priest who sided with David.

Prithvi is still confused as to why Nandita is involved. They learn that Yash had recorded Veer's murder but sold it to David in return for sponsorship of his show. Yash says he did this after Nandita told him that you have to "sell the truth to buy your dreams." Yash tries to kill Nandita and Prithvi so the truth doesn't come out; Veer's ghost kills Yash and heals Prithvi's wounds. Nandita reflects on her past words.

== Cast ==
- Emraan Hashmi as Prithvi Singh, an artist
- Kangana Ranaut as Nandita Chopra, an aspiring model haunted by strange activities
- Adhyayan Suman as Yash Dayal, Nandita's boyfriend who debunked supernatural and paranormal activities as superstitions
- Jackie Shroff as Veer Pratap Singh, Prithvi's father (special appearance)
- Varun Badola as Inspector Amin
- Anupam Shyam as Dayal Kaka, Yash's uncle

== Production ==
=== Development ===
Screenwriter Shagufta Rafiq stated in an interview that the story is based on Sant Kabir's idiom, "Bura jo dekhan main chala, Bura na milya koi; Jo dil khoja apna, Ta mujh sa bura na koi", which means that the evil is within oneself and that is the message of the film. Vikram Bhatt (who was the original Raaz director) was replaced by Mohit Suri. Suri had reportedly added more dramatic space to the film and played around with visuals and sounds which led to an extraordinary pace. Suri was inspired after reading Hindu mythology, where good and evil are represented in stark contrast.

Multiple scenes in the film are borrowed from other horror films; the bathtub horror scenes and the well in the end are similar to The Ring, the scene where a man is found inside the hidden roof floor of a house is similar to The Grudge, the future prediction, plot, the road accident with the wild bulls and various other sequences were taken from films such as Final Destination, Mirrors and the TV series Heroes. Reportedly, the main secret revealed in the climax was inspired from the 2000 American film Erin Brockovich where the female lead also investigates the water of an area getting contaminated due to a nearby Energy and Gas plant.

=== Casting ===
Kangana Ranaut replaced Bipasha Basu as the female lead, playing Nandita, a supermodel. Amrita Rao was offered the role, but declined. To prepare for the role, Ranaut had to reportedly undergo many different looks and even changed her hair colour to red. Emraan Hashmi was cast as Prithvi, a painter with no contact to the outside world, replacing Dino Morea as the male lead. According to the actor, though comparisons are evident with Raaz (2002), this film has a different plot and will give a new definition to the horror genre. Dino Morea expressed his disappointment with the decision saying "I'm not disappointed but definitely baffled. How can they make a Raaz 2 without anyone from the original cast? How can it be a sequel, then?". Adhyayan Suman plays Yash, a documentary filmmaker who is perceived as an atheist and believes in scientific rationale behind everything. His beliefs are challenged in the film. He reportedly called this film his debut, despite debuting in the Haal-e-dil (2008). Sonal Chauhan was reportedly offered Kangana's role which she declined. Jackie Shroff was reported to be playing Kangana's father, which after the release was revealed to be Emraan's father.

=== Filming ===
Filming began in June 2008 in Shimla. Some parts of filming took place in Mumbai. Kangana was paid ₹6 million for her role in the film. The film received an A certificate from the Censor Board of Film Certification. Mukesh Bhatt however denied these claims stating the film received a U/A certificate. Filming completed on 10 November 2008 in Mumbai.

Sushant Singh Rajput assisted director Mohit Suri during the making of the film.

=== Promotion ===
The teaser trailer was released by Hashmi in November 2008 alongside the film Fashion.

Sony BMG partnered with social networking site Ibibo to launch a website for the film. The RTMC application allowed Ibibo members to participate in a movie making contest where the winner got the chance to spend a day with Mohit Suri, and learn the art of filmmaking from him. Ashish Kashyap, the CEO of Ibibo, said, "The Raaz – The Mystery Continues application on Ibibo reiterates our core value proposition to recognize talent and enable users to self express and engage with latest Bollywood content. This is a perfect example of a Bollywood movie promotion leveraging the power of social media on Ibibo".

The theatrical trailer was released alongside Ghajini and Rab Ne Bana Di Jodi. Kangana Ranaut and Emraan Hashmi initially did not participate in promotions. However, the entire cast, including Hashmi and Ranaut, later appeared for the promotions in Bangalore.

== Reception ==
=== Critical response ===
The film received mixed reviews from critics.

The Times of India gave 3 out of 5 stars saying that,"Emraan Hashmi & Kangana Ranaut bring the Gangster magic again....they have done a good job whereas Adhyayan Suman shows promise." Bollywood Hungama gave a good review saying "On the whole, Raaz – The Mystery Continues is rich in the horror quotient and that is one of its major USPs, besides the highly competent performances by its principal cast and a lilting musical score. At the box-office, this one will continue the winning streak of Mahesh Bhatt and Mukesh Bhatt's Vishesh Films. The 4-day weekend [Monday, January 26 in a holiday] will only cement its status further. Go for it!". The lead actors were praised for their performance. In the review, "On the acting front, both Emraan and Kangana vie for top honours. Emraan is excellent. He conveys a lot through facial expressions and that's the sign of a proficient actor. He's just getting better and better with every film. Kangana is top notch. After Fashion, this one's another power-packed performance from the actress. Adhyayan Suman is super-confident and registers a strong impact, especially towards the climax. He shows promise. Jackie Shroff is quite okay in a brief role." NDTV gave a negative review saying "The first Raaz, which married the Hollywood film What Lies Beneath with the myth of Savitri who pursued Yamraj until her husband came back to life, had a cheesy appeal. This Raaz is a big bore. The scares are tired and Suri doesn't know how to pace them out. So, every minute, something awful is happening, from a bull attack to mutilation and murder. Was I scared? Not once. This mystery was better left discontinued." AOL reviewer Noyon Jyoti Parasara too rated the film low. He gave the film a mere 2 out of 5 and said, "Raaz – The Mystery Continues, which with all its hype was supposed scare the lights out of you, could not make me bat an eyelid out of fear. So there go all expectations!."

=== Box office ===
According to Box Office India, the film performed moderately at the box-office, grossing over ₹119 million within three days of its release. At the end of its theatrical run in India, it grossed ₹345.0 million (US$3.7 million) and was declared a Semi-Hit.

== Music ==
Raaz: The Mystery Continues

Soundtrack album by Raju Singh
- Released: 6 December 2008
- Genre: Feature film soundtrack
- Length: 37:58
- Label: Sony BMG
- Producer: Mahesh Bhatt

Raju Singh chronology
Gauri: The Unborn (2007)	Raaz: The Mystery Continues (2008)	Pankh (2009)

The music of the film was released by Sony BMG.

=== Reception ===
Professional ratings
Review scores
Source	Rating
Oneindia.in	link
NDTV Music	4.5/5 stars

The music received positive reviews with tracks like "Maahi", "Kaisa Ye Raaz Hai" and "Soniyo" being particularly praised. NDTV gave a good review writing "Overall, the music of Raaz – The Mystery Continues has its own place under the sun. It is definitely worth listening."

One India gave a positive review writing "The music of Raaz – TMC indeed impresses, the soundtrack here is yet another good addition to the enviable music catalogue of the Bhatts and Emraan would certainly have some more chartbusters to add to his name. As for the last question i.e. whether Raaz – TMC matches up to Nadeem-Shravan's Raaz, then well, let's put it this way that albums like Aashiqui, Raaz or a Saajan are made only once and there shouldn't even be a conscious effort to replicate or surpass them. In this regard, the music of Raaz – TMC has its own place under the sun and what matters in the end is whether it works for the film or not. Well, the answer for this one is a firm Yes!. The song "Maahi" became a chartbuster after its release. According to the Indian trade website Box Office India, with around 13,00,000 units sold, this film's soundtrack album was the year's twelfth highest-selling.

=== Soundtrack ===
The soundtrack was composed by Shaarib-Toshi, Raju Singh, Pranay M. Rijia, and Gourov Dasgupta. Sharib-Toshi made their debuts with this film, alongside Gourov Dasgupta and Pranav M. Rijia. The lyrics for "Soniyo" and "Soniyo" (From The Heart Mix) were written by Kumaar. All other songs were written by Sayeed Quadri.

All lyrics are written by Sayeed Quadri.

No.	Title	Music	Singer(s)	Length
1.	"Maahi"	Shaarib-Toshi	Zubeen Garg, Toshi Sabri	5:29
2.	"Soniyo" (lyrics by Kumaar)	Raju Singh	Sonu Nigam, Neeraj Shridhar, Shreya Ghoshal, Zubeen Garg (Alaap)	5:28
3.	"O Jaana"	Raju Singh	KK	4:30
4.	"Kaisa Yeh Raaz Hai"	Pranav M Rija	KK	6:17
5.	"Banda Re"	Gourov Dasgupta	Krishna Beura	5:05
6.	"Soniyo (From the Heart)" (lyrics by Kumaar)	Raju Singh	Krishna Beura	5:33
7.	"Maahi (Rock with Me)"	Raju Singh	Toshi Sabri	4:45
8.	"O Jaana (Dance with Me)"	Raju Singh	KK	3:59

== Sequel and reboot ==
With Raaz TMC getting an encouraging opening, a third instalment of the series, Raaz 3 was released on 7 September 2012. The film received an overwhelming response at the box office and emerged as the highest-grossing film of the trilogy.

A fourth film, Raaz Reboot, was released on 16 September 2016.

== Accolades ==
Award Ceremony	Category	Recipient	Result	Ref.(s)
2nd Mirchi Music Awards	Best Background Score	Raju Singh	Won	
