= Raju Singh =

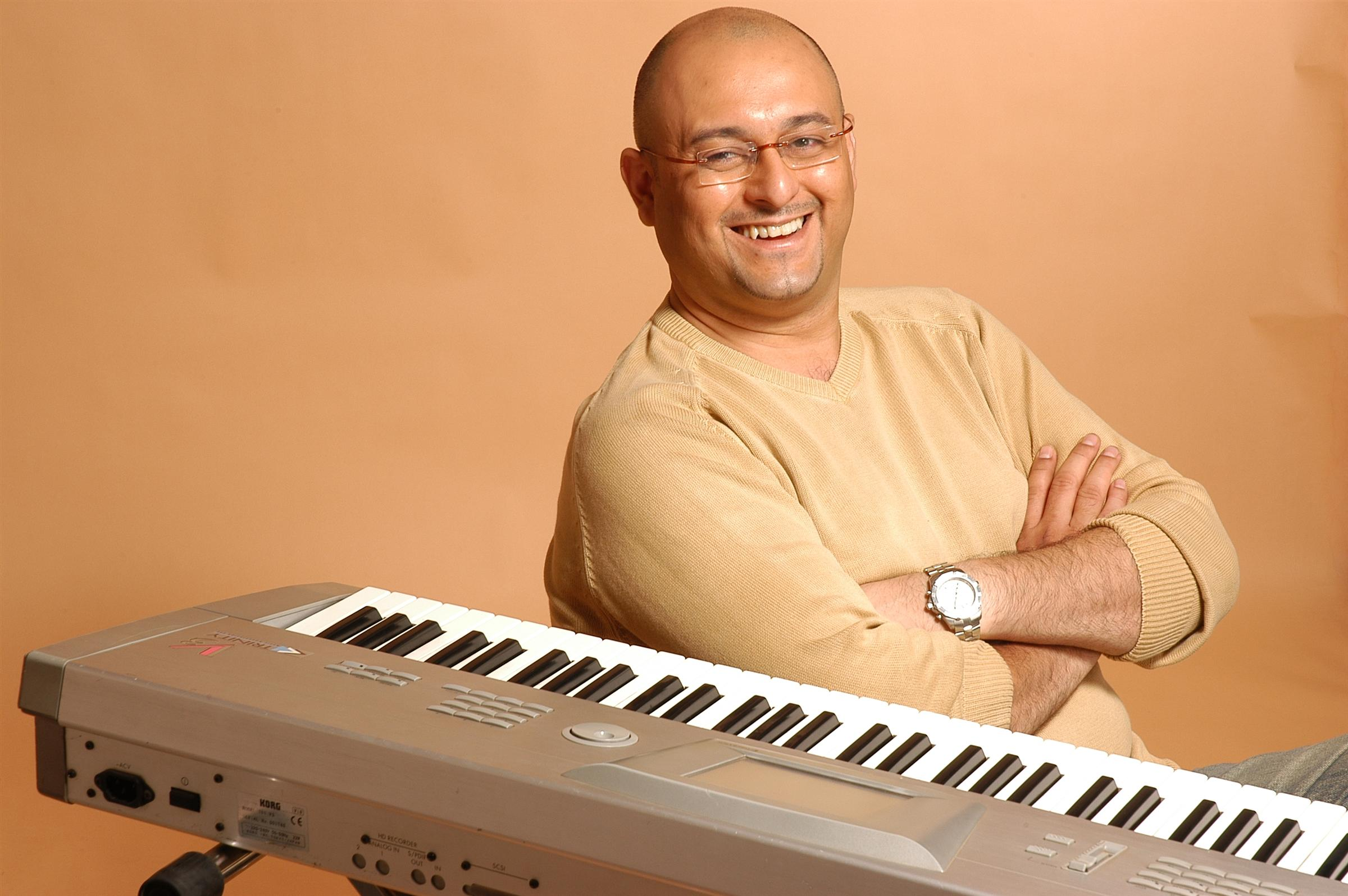

Background information
- Born: Rajinder Singh Panesar; 3 April 1969 (age 57); Mumbai, India
- Genres: Film score, TV, Jingles, Channel Anthems
- Occupations: Composer, music director, music producer, singer, arranger
- Instruments: Piano, Bass Guitar, Acoustic Guitar, Drums, Electric Guitar, Tabla
- Years active: 1983–present
- Website: rajusingh.com

Raju Singh (Full name: Rajinder Singh Panesar) is an Indian film score composer, session musician, singer and a guitarist. His first collaboration was with Malkit Singh of Hai Jamalo fame. Together with Adesh Srivastav they released an album called I Love Golden Star which was quite a rage in the underground circles in Britain. Some of his early compositions include of shows are Dekh Bhai Dekh, Filmi Chakkar, Aahat, Boogie Woogie and CID.

== Early life ==
Rajinder Singh Panesar, aka Raju Singh, was born on 3 April 1969 in Mumbai, India. Son of Gursharan Kaur Panesar and Charanjit Singh Panesar; his father hails from Amritsar and Mother from Ferozepur, Punjab.

Singh's family lived in Juhu, Mumbai. He attended St. Xavier's High school, Vile Parle and completed college from Mithibai college in 1986. Singh did his first album an Instrumental Tracks Power Of Music with his friend Aadesh Shrivastav in the year 1987 under the label of Venus.

== Career ==
As a musician, Singh started playing for Uttam Singh who introduced him as a guitarist for the song Mere Pyar Ki Umar for the movie Waaris, sung by Lata Mangeshkar and Manmohan. Initially he started off as a guitarist with R D Burman and was a part of his last movie 1942: A Love Story then slowly progressed on to become an arranger, music director, composer and scorer for Bollywood movies later composing and directing for television and advertising. One of the famous hits is Soniyo from Raaz: The Mystery Continues, Gungunati Hain from Satta.

== Discography ==
=== As a composer ===
==== Soundtracks ====
Year	Film
1995	Bewafa Sanam
1998	Angaaray
2000	Snehapoorvam Anna
2001	Chandni Bar
2001	Paagalpan
2003	Satta
2004	School
2004	Charas
2004	Chot
2007	Salaam Baache
2007	Traffic Signal
2009	Raaz - The Mystery Continues
2009	Karma Aur Holi
2009	God Lives in Himalayas
2010	Pankh
2010	Khichdi the Movie
2010	Prem Kaa Game
2010	Accident on Hill Road
2011	Yeh Dooriyan
2016	Raakh

==== Albums ====
Year	Album	Label	Artist	Lyricist	Songs
	Kashmakash				HIRNI JAISI CHAAL; ALLAH HO ALLAH RAMA O RAMA; JAHAN JAYEGA; ANJANE NAGAR; AAJ AASMAN SE; AAJ KA DIN HAI; TUM MERE HO; TUMNE APNO KA DIL
	Colgate A Reason to Smile	Sony Music Entertainment	Shyam anuragi		Choti Choti Baatein; Fifty Fifty
1988	I Love Golden Star	Oriental Star Agencies Ltd	Raju Singh		IS DAAJ NOON KARDEO BAND MUNDO; PUNJAB MERA RAHE VASDA
1988	Put Sardaran De	Oriental Star Agencies Ltd	Raju Singh	Malkit Singh	AKH LAAR GAYEE BILLO DE NAAL; MERE NAAL MERE NAAL NACH KURRIYIE
1989	Pump Up The Culture	Oriental Star Agencies Ltd	Raju Singh	Tarlochan Singh Bilga	BHABHI GHUND CHAKDEH; BHABHIYA AKH; BHANGRAY WICH; EH RISH VAT; GIDDHA AJJ PENDA; GORI GORI CHITTI CHITTI; PUMP UP THE CULTURE; VEER DA SENRA
1991	Aira Gaira Nathu Khaira	Saregama	Sunidhi Chauhan		Aira Gaira Nathu Khaira; Badra; Chudiyan; Govinda Kal Mere Ghar Aaya; Jiyo Magar Haske; Khusbu/KHUSHBOO; Socho; Swapna Paree / SWAPNA PARI
1992	Power of Music	Venus Records	Madoon		Rock on Rock; Title Music; True Blue; Venus; Walk Like an Egyptian
1993	MAIYA TAARO NAIYA	SUPER CASSETTES INDUSTRIES LTD	Raju Singh	Nirdosh Balbir	AAYO SARE CHALE MATA VAISHNO KE DWAR; BHAKTO KI VINITI; CHOODIYA CHADOO MAIN CHALO BHI; DAATI MAA BHAWANO WAALI; MAA KE BHAKT JANO; MAA SHERA WALI MAA MEHARA WALI; MAIYA TARO NAIYA; NAHI MAA JAISA KOI DUJA HAI; SANKAT HAR DE MERE MAA
1995	Roop Inka Mastana	Megnasound	suchitra		Aaj Kal Tere Mere; Aayega; Dil Asia Kisine; Musafir; Naina Barse; Phooloka Taroka; Pyar Hua; Roop Tera Mastana
1995	Haiyya	SUPER CASSETTES INDUSTRIES LTD	Raju Singh	Bhushan Dua	CHANDANI RAATEIN YE MULAKATEIN DO GHADI; DIL MEIN JISE BASAYA THA APNE BANYA THA USNE HI TODA MERA DIL; DUNIYA MEIN SABSE BADA, PAISA YE PAISA; GORI TERA NAKHRA; HAIYA HAIYA; MAHI RE; MURGA RAP; NAGMA O; NARGISI NAR; TUM JAISA
1995	Koi Baat Nahin	Plus Music	Sadhana Sargam, Sonu Nigam	Raajesh Johri	Jaage Tere Sapne; Kabhi Tum Lage Zindagi; Koi Baat Nahin; Mera Dil Chahe; Naino Mein Tere Hain Sapne; Socha Sau Dafa; Yeh Mera Dil; Yeh Naya Naya
1996	Sangam	SAREGAMA Records	Nusrat fateh ali khan	Javed Akhtar	Afreen
1996	Dance Dhamaka Vol 1	NK Production	Zubeen Garg		Roop Tera Mastana
1997	Naya Naya Pyaar	Plus Music	Sonu Nigam	Yogesh	Jaage Tere Sapne; Kabhi Tum Lage Zindagi; Koi Baat Nahin; Mera Dil Chahe; Naino Mein; Socha Sau Dafa; Ye Mera Dil/YEH MERE; Ye Naya Naya
1997	Tum Yaad Aaye	Big Music	Alka Yagnik	Javed Akhtar	Saare Sapne; Saawli Si Ek Ladki Aarzu Ke ..; Zara Zara Si Baatein; Sagar Se Bhi Gehari Aankhen; Jab Geet Hawaon Ne Gaye / JAB TUM YAAD AAYE; Tum Nahin To Jaise Mere Hothon; Gehri Neeli Shaam; Pyar Mein Humne Kya Paya Tha; GOONJ RAHA HAI; TUM YAAD AAYE
1997	Kaun Hai Wohh	Saregama	Amrita bhende	Shyam Anuragi	Kaun Hai Who
1997	Aaha	Megnasound	Suchitra	Arjun Raaj, Dirgha Sampat	Aha; Holere; Its Hot; Kya Hua; Na Tha Woh Mera; Waiting; Halla Gulla; O Meri Jaan
1997	Sapne Ki Baat	T-Series	Sonu nigam	Shyamraj	Zindagi Ka Haath Choom Loon; Sapne Ki Baat Main; Papa I Am Sorry; Kiya Kyon Dhoka; Gar Mera Bas Chale; Udlay Udlay Chahe Jahan; Wohi Neeli Jheel Sa Hai Aasman/VAHI NEELI; Main To Chala
1997	JALSA - Gujarati	SUPER CASSETTES INDUSTRIES LTD	Raju Singh	Devang Patel	GAL NA BOLAY; JALSA KAR - 1; JALSA KAR - 2; NA NA NA; VICHITRALOK
1999	Aish Kar	SUPER CASSETTES INDUSTRIES LTD	Raju Singh	Devang Patel	AISH TU KAR; GALI NA BOLNA; NA NA AISA NAHI KARTE; RADIO PROGRAMME ' VICHITRALOK '
2001	Caliche	Virgin Records	Caliche		Aa Kareeb Aa; Additappa; Additappa (Sing Along); Dekho Tum Jidhar; Dha Dhin Dhin Dha; Hosh Uda Ke; Hosh Uda Ke (The Unconscious Mix); Hua (Haan Pyar Hai Hua); Mar gayee; Pyar Nahin
2001	Tum Aaye	Sony BMG	Alka Yagnik	Javed Akhtar	Aa Saath Aa; Kya Tumhe Bhi Aisa; Kya Tumhe Pata Hai; Meri Yaadon Mein Ab Tak; Mujhe Aaj Tune; Nazaare Jaage; Tum Aaye; Tum Aaye 2; Tum Jo Mile
2002	Unique	Tips	jagjit Singh		Tere Chehra
	The Wet Mix				Hai Hai yeh Mujboori
	Wah Bhai Wah		Pradeep Roy		Goriye; Mere Daftar Main Ek Ladki Hai; Mr Shaukeen; Shikayat; Unka Aana; Wah Bhai Wah; Yaara; Yun Hi
	Ravi		Ravi Behl		Bol Sachh Bol; Dekha Jo Tujhe; Dil De De Dena; Har pal; Jaanaa; Jab Koi Nahin Tha; Kyun Hai; Ladkiyaan; Tera Kya Iraadaa
2002	Shantiago Bollywood goes Latino		Shaan, Amit Kumar		Hum ko to yaara teri yaari; Mana Janab Ne Pukara Nahin (Remix)
2002	VIVA	Times Music	VIVA		Kis Se Poochhain
2003	Shairana the Poetic	Universal	Alka Yagnik	Javed Akhtar	Aankhon Mein Leke Pyaar; Chandani Si; Hazaron Chehron Mein; Jagi Si Hai Kali Kali; Na Kisi Dost, Na Humdum; Pehle Jo Uska; Titliyaan Udd Rahi Hain; Tum Jo Nazar Ho To
2003	Jassi Jaise Koi Nahi	SONY MUSIC ENTERTAINMENT INDIA PRIVATE LIMITED	Raju Singh	Vaibhav Modi, Kumaar	Choo Liya; Jassi Jaisi Koi Nahin [Title Track]; Jassi Jaisi Koi Nahin[Bhangra Version); Tham Ja
2003	Skippy's Animal Jamboree	Kangabeat Entertainment Pvt Ltd	Raju Singh	Traditional	Animal Ride; Bear Hunt; Der Glumph; Dingle Dangle Scarecrow; Dorothy The Dinosour; Ek Billi Hamari; Ek Mota Hathi; Elephant Called James; Five Little Monkeys; Five Little Puppies; Hey Polly Wiggle; Incy Wincy Spider; Machli Jal Ki Rani Hai; Mein Toh So Rahi Thi; Mein Toh Tuk Tuk Tortoise Hoon; Moo Moo Brown Cow; Roar Says The Lion; Six Little Ducks; Skippy The Kangaroo; This Little Piggy; Three Jelly Fish; Three Little Pigs; Walking Through The Jungle
2004	Dance Blast	Saregama	Amrita Bhende	Shyam Anuragi	
2004	Skippy's Underwater Adventure	Kangabeat Entertainment Pvt Ltd	Raju Singh	Lina Ashar	A Whale Of A Time; Can You Tell Me; Five Jelly Fish; Five Little Fish; I Am; I’D Like To Be A Creature Under The Sea; Neele Neele Samundar Main; Oh Watch It Go!; Ok Let’S Do A Nonsensical Song!; Skippy The Kangaroo; The Rock And Roll Penguin; Wonders Under The Sea
2005	Teri Chahat Mein	Times Music	Manish Agarwal	Kumaar	Aankhein Meri; Jo Lab Kahein; Maine Puchha Hai; Naina; Pal Do Pal Mein; Tum Ho Saagar; Zindagi Ke
2006	Dhun	Fontana India	Prem	Anand Bakshi	Aap Aaye; Hai re Hai; Jaan jaye / JAAN JAANDIYE; Main Ek Ladki; Maine Tujhko; Mere Samne; Tanha; Usay Salam
2006	Skippy's Rhythmic Rhymes	Kangabeat Entertainment Pvt Ltd	Raju Singh	Traditional	3 Little Magic Words; Are You Sleeping?; Butterfly, Butterfly; Elly The Elephant; Fe - Fi – Fe – Fi; Fire Truck; Five Little Fishes; Fruity Song; Funny Funny Monkey; Giraffe; Horsey Horsey; How Much Is That Doggie?; I Am A Little Rocket; I Love You; I’ll Take You Riding; In My House; Little Cottage In The Woods; Moo Moo, Brown Cow; Octopus; Open Them, Shut Them; Out In The Garden; Peanut Peanut; Shadow Man; Skinnamrinky Dinky Dink; Thumbkin
2006	Mere Piya	T-Series	Sonu Nigam, Sapna Mukherjee	Sudhakar Sharma, Kumar	Aa Bhi Jaao Sanam; Aas Paas; Dhadkanon Mein; Dil Mein Bhi Tum; Madhbhari; Main Jaanoo Na; Piya
2006	Colour Magic	Kangabeat Entertainment Pvt Ltd	Raju Singh	Dirgha Sampat, Lina Ashar, Candida Vaz	As Seasons Change, Colours Do Too; Colour Clown; Colour Magic; Colours All Around; Colours Make You Glad; Flags; If There Was No Colour What Would We Do; Rainbow; Shades Of Green; Traffic Lights; What Colours Buds Hide; Yellow Butterfly
2007	Discovering De Body Machine	Kangabeat Entertainment Pvt Ltd	Raju Singh	Susan Biswas, Wendy Parr, Marianne D'Cruz	Body Machine; Breathe; Cells; Dem Bones; Digestion; Five Senses; Fuel; Heartbeat; Muscles; My Kidneys; Nerves
2007	OUR BLUE PLANET	Kangabeat Entertainment Pvt Ltd	Raju Singh	Lynn D'Lima, Rohini Singh-Bhatia, Susan Biswas, Marianne D'Cruz, Aditya Narayan	Conservation; Continents; Earthquake; Latitude And Longitude; Oceans; Our Blue Blue Planet; Pangea; Rotation And Revolution; The Solar System; V-O-L-C-A-N-O; Water Cycle
2007	OUR INDIA	Kangabeat Entertainment Pvt Ltd	Raju Singh	Reshma Jani	Festival Of India; Food Journey; Freedom Fighters; Independence Day; Indus Valley Civilization; Invaders In India; Mahatma Gandhi; Monuments Of India; Republic Day; States; Where Is India?
2007	A Gift For Me	Kangabeat Entertainment Pvt Ltd	Raju Singh	Candida Vaz, Susan Biswas, Marianne D'Cruz, Dirgha Sampat	A Gift For Me; Count To Ten; I Believe In Me; Joey Get Along; Khan Confidence; Let Me Color The Wall; Owl Organized; Persistence; Robin Resilience; The Ants Go Marching; Wake Up
2009	ALVIDA- NUSRAT FATEH ALI KHAN	SAREGAMA PLC	Raju Singh	Javed Akhtar	AFREEN AFREEN (ALBUM - SANGAM 96)
2010	Mera Dil Chahe	T-Series	Sonu Nigam, Mrudal		Hum Ne Dekha Nahi; Mera Dil Chahe; Sare Sapne; Socha Sau Dafa
	Aapka Abhijeet Sawant	Sony BMG	Abhijeet Sawant	Sameer	Ek Jahaan One World; Mohabatein Lutauunga / MOHABBATEIN IUTAAUNGA
2010	Yeh Naya Naya Mera Dil Chahe	T-Series	Sadhana Sargam, Sonu Nigam, Hema Sirdesai	Raajesh johri	Jaage Tere Sapne; Kabhi Tum Lage Zindagi; Koi Baat Nahin; Mera Dil Chahe; Naino Mein Tere Hain Sapne; Socha Sau Dafa; Yeh Mera Dil; Yeh Naya Naya

==== Film scores ====
Year	Film	Language	Notes
	Saraswati	Hindi	
1984	Purana Mandir	Hindi	
1990	Jungle Love	Hindi	
1990	Kaarnama	Hindi	
1990	Jungle love	Hindi	
1991	Saugandh	Hindi	
1991	Haque	Hindi	
1991	Dancer	Hindi	
1992	Mr. Bond	Hindi	
1993	Hum Hain Kamaal Ke	Hindi	
1993	Ashant	Hindi	
1993	Sainik	Hindi	
1994	Baali Umar Ko Salaam	Hindi	
1994	Churake Dil Mera	Hindi	
1995	Sabse Bada Khiladi	Hindi	
1995	Pandav	Hindi	
1996	Sanshodhan	Hindi	
1996	Khiladiyon Ka Khiladi	Hindi	
1996	Himmat	Hindi	
1996	Girvi	Hindi	
1998	Qila	Hindi	
1999	Lawaaris	Hindi	
2000	Snehapoorvam Anna	Malayalam	
2000	Dil Pe Mat Le Yaar!!	Hindi	
2001	Admissions Open	Hindi	
2001	2001: Do Hazaar Ek	Hindi	
2001	Paagalpan	Hindi	
2001	Chandni Bar	Hindi	
2002	Satta	Hindi	
2002	Yeh Mohabbat Hai	Hindi	
2002	Na Tum Jaano Na Hum	Hindi	
2003	Ishq Vishk	Hindi	
2003	Armaan	Hindi	
2004	School	Hindi	
2004	Chot	Hindi	
2004	Fida	Hindi	
2005	Page 3	Hindi	
2005	Zeher	Hindi	
2005	Kalyug	Hindi	
2005	Nazar	Hindi	
2005	Koi Aap Sa	Hindi	
2005	Hum Joh Keh na Paaye	Hindi	
2006	Gangster	Hindi	
2006	Woh Lamhe	Hindi	
2006	Corporate	Hindi	
2006	Aap Ki Khatir	Hindi	
2006	Jaane Hoga Kya	Hindi	
2006	Dhokha	Hindi	
2006	Salaam Bacche	Hindi	
2006	Killer	Hindi	
2007	Awarapan	Hindi	
2007	Traffic Signal	Hindi	
2007	Aggar: Passion Betrayal Terror	Hindi	
2007	Gauri: The Unborn	Hindi	
2007	Dus Kahaaniyan (Gubbare)	Hindi	
2007	Showbiz	Hindi	
2007	Life in a Metro	Hindi	
2008	Thodi Life Thoda Magic	Hindi	
2008	Kidnap	Hindi	
2008	Jannat	Hindi	
2008	Krazzy 4	Hindi	
2008	Khulay Aasman Kay Neechay	Pakistani	
2009	Raaz: The Mystery Continues	Hindi	
2009	Karma Aur Holi	Hindi	
2009	Jai Veeru	Hindi	
2009	Jashnn	Hindi	
2009	Tum Mile	Hindi	
2009	Accident On Hill Road	Hindi	
2009	Shadow	Hindi	
2009	Fast Forward	Hindi	
2009	Chintuji	Hindi	
2010	We Are Family	Hindi	
2010	Khichdi The Movie	Hindi	
2010	Fired	Hindi	
2010	Toh Baat Pakki!	Hindi	
2010	Prem Kaa Game	Hindi	
2010	Crook: It's Good To Be Bad	Hindi	
2010	Pankh	Hindi	
2010	A Flat	Hindi	
2010	Mar Jawan Gur Khake (Punjabi)	Punjabi	
2011	Shabri	Hindi	
2011	Murder 2	Hindi	
2012	Raaz 3	Hindi	
2012	Dangerous Ishhq	Hindi	
2012	Jannat 2	Hindi	
2012	Blood Money	Hindi	
2012	Ghost	Hindi	
2013	Yamla Pagla Deewana 2	Hindi	
2013	Phata Poster Nikhla Hero	Hindi	
2013	Aashiqui 2	Hindi	
2013	Murder 3	Hindi	
2013	Jayantabhai Ki Luv Story	Hindi	
2013	Oye Hoye Pyar Ho Gaya	Punjabi	
2014	Super Nani	Hindi	
2014	Yaariyan	Hindi	
2014	Sholay 3D	Hindi	
2014	Jatt James Bond	Punjabi	
2014	Punjab 1984	Punjabi	
2014	City Lights	Hindi	
2014	Ek Villain	Hindi	
2015	Mr. X	Hindi	
2015	3 A.M.	Hindi	
2015	Bezubaan Ishq	Hindi	
2015	Khamoshiyan	Hindi	
2015	Barkhaa	Hindi	
2015	Hamari Adhuri Kahani	Hindi	
2015	Ishq Ne Krazy Kiya Re	Hindi	
2015	Shareek	Punjabi	
2015	Sardaar Ji	Punjabi	
2015	Sardaar ji	Punjabi	
2016	Channo Kamli Yaar Di	Punjabi	
2016	Sanam Re	Hindi	
2016	Kya Kool Hain Hum 3	Hindi	
2016	Zorawar	Hindi	
2016	Junooniyat	Hindi	
2016	Do Lafzon Ki Kahani	Hindi	
2016	Raaz Reboot	Hindi	
2017	Half_Girlfriend	Hindi	
2017	Dushman (Punjabi Movie )	Punjabi	
2017	Irada	Hindi	
2017	Jindua	Punjabi	
2017	Santa Banta	Hindi and Punjabi	
2017	Sargi	Punjabi	
2017	Super Singh	Punjabi/Hindi	
2017	Toofan Singh (Punjab)	Punjabi	
2018	Jalebi	Hindi	
2018	Harjeeta	Punjabi	
2018	Yamla Pagla Deewana Phir Se	Hindi	
2018	Prem Gajra Chilli Chicken	Hindi	
2019	Kesari	Hindi	
2019	Pal Pal Dil Ke Paas	Hindi	
2019	LITTLE SINGHAM BANDARPUR MEIN HU HA HU	Hindi	
2019	Little Singham Chala London	Hindi	
2020	Sab Kushal Mangal	Hindi	
2020	Malang	Hindi	
2021	Dial 100 (2021 film)	Hindi	
2021	Little Singham - Rise of Kaal (Kaal Ka Mahajaal)	Hindi	
2021	LITTLE SINGHAM: KAAL KI TABAAHI	Hindi	
2021	SHAQ		
2022	Ek Villain Returns	Hindi	
2022	Little Singham Future Mein Satakli	Hindi	
2022	Little Singham Ki Black Shadow Se Takkar	Hindi	
2022	Little Singham Samundar Ka Sikandar	Hindi	
2022	LITTLE SINGHAM: MAHABALI	Hindi	
2023	Kali Jotta	Punjabi	
2026	Hai Jawani Toh Ishq Hona Hai	Hindi	

=== As a singer ===
==== Others ====
Year	Work	Song	Music director	Lyricist
2005	Sarkarr:Rishton Ki Ankahi Kahani	Sarrkkar Risshton Ki Ankahi Kahani	Raju Singh	
2006	Jab Love Hua	Jab Love Hua	Raju Singh	Preiti Mamgain
2008	Jaane Kya Baat Hui	Title – Jane Kya Baat Hui	Raju Singh	Nida Fazli
2009	Love Ne Mila Di Jodi	Love Ne Mila Di Jodi	Raju Singh	
2009	Jaane Pehchaane Se... Ye Ajnabbi	Jaane Pehchaane Se... Ye Ajnabbi	Raju Singh	
2010	Geet Hui Sabse Parayi	Mahi ve	Raju Singh	
2011	Ek Hazaaron Mein Meri Behna Hai	Tu Hi Tu	Raju Singh	
2011	Iss Pyaar ko kya naam doon	Rabba Ve	Raju Singh	
2012	Election Campaign	Vote for Sherley Singh	Raju Singh	

=== Films ===
Year	Film	Song	Music director	Lyrics
2013	Club 60	"Rooh Mein"	Pranit Gedham	Dr. Mahendra Madhukar
2014	Dedh Ishqiya	Zabaan Jale Hai	Vishal Bhardwaj	Gulzar

=== As composer for background score ===
Serial Name
STAR PLUS
Iss Pyaar Ko Kya Naam Doon?
Pari Hoon Main
Ishqbaaaz
Sanjivani
Dil Boley Oberoi
Love Ne Mila Di Jodi
Dil Mil Gaye
Jaane Pehchaane Se... Ye Ajnabbi
Kya Hadsa Kya Haqeekat
Ssshhhh...Koi Hai
Shanno Ki Shaadi
Annu Ki Ho Gayee Waah Bhai Waah
Gharwali Uparwali
Kisme Kitna Hai Dhum
Kulja Sim Sim
Meri Mrs. Chanchala
Tanha
Chalti Ka Naam Antakashri
Jadoo
Kuch Kar Dikhana Hai
Kya Masti Kya Dhoom
Hum Saath Aath Hain
Daal Me Kala
ZEE TV
Woh
Jhansi Ki Rani (TV series)
Connected Hum Tum
Jhoome Jiiya Re
The Thief of Bagdad
Khana Khazana
Jabb Love Hua
Karawas
V 3
Sanam
Samjauta
Nathkhat
Sarkaar
Tanaav
Parvarish
Dil Se Dosti
Jane Kaha Mera Jigar Gaya
Boogie Woogie
Just Mohabbat
Star Yaar Kalakar
Dhadkan
Aahat
CID
Ek Ladki Anjani Si
Devi
Amber Dhara
Sunday Ke Sunday
Jane Kaha Mera Jigar Gaya
Uncensored
5 Star Xpressit
Missing
Tujpe Dil Qurban
Khel
Sahib Biwi Aur Ghulam
Kohinoor
Raat Hone Ko Hai
Baal Baal Bache
Dekh Bhai Dekh
Kashma Kash
Baaje Paayal
Metro Club
Magic Mission
Aasman Se Aage
Maan
Colgate Top Ten
Jane Kya Baat Hui
Jab Khelo Sab Khelo
LOC
Paisa Vasool
Dhoom Machao Dhoom
Safar
Veer
Miscellaneous
Kuch Kar Dikhana Hai
Uf Ye Mohabbat
Inspector Eagle
The Real Count Down
Zaroorat Hai Zaroorat
M I 4
Hee Hee Ha Ha
Good Morning India
Ret
Detective
Mr. Hero
Bombay Talkies
Kama Sutra
Ready Steady Go
Jharoka
Priya Tendulkar Show
Cafe Dil Nawaz
Akbar Birbal
Studio 2
Jaal
Niyat
Tara Rum Pum
Husband And Wife
Kulja Sim Sim
Do Aur Do Paanch
Kiran
Dhun
Manzile Aur Bhi Hain
Aur Phir Ek Dhin
Daayra
Ladies Only
Saaj
Agni Chakra
Kangan
Chalti Ka Naam Antakashri
Gaate Raho.Com
Love Main Kabhi Kabhi
Humare Tumhare
Meri Mrs. Chanchala
Janeman Janeman
Kahin Deep Jale Kahin Dil
Aasman Se Tapka
Tumhareliye
Jab Jab Fool Mile
Phalki
Dil Ki Baatein
Dhadkan
Dil Se Dosti
Hum Hai Dilwale
Deewane To Deewane Hain
Shakalaka Boom Boom
Kya Kehti Hai Ye Dhun

Serial Name
Star Plus
Ek Hasina Thi
Ek Nanad Ki Khushiyon Ki Chaabi...Meri Bhabhi
Arjun
Honeymoon -Teri Meri Love Stories
Barsat -Teri Meri Love Stories
Ek hazaro mein meri bahana hai
Maryaada Lekin Kab Tak?
Yeh ishq haaye
Iss Pyaar Ko Kya Naam Doon
Geet
Dil Mil Gaye
Behenein
Jaane Pehchaane Se... Ye Ajnabbi
Love Ne Mila Di Jodi
Miley Jab Hum Tum
Annu Ki Ho Gayee Waah Bhai Waah
Life Nahi Hai Ladoo
Pari Hoon Main
Sanjivani
Shhhhh ......
ZEE TV
Maharakshak Devi
Fear Files
Lilchamps
Badalte Rishton Ki Dastaan
Qubool Hai
Rab Se Sohna Isshq
Phir Subah Hogi
Shobha Somnath ki
Chhoti Si Zindagi
Jhansi Ki Rani
12/24 Karol Baag
Shree
Jab Love Hua
Ranbir Rano
Jhoome Jiiya Re
Banegi Apni Baat
Dil Se Diya Vachan
Hamari Betiyoon Ka Vivah
Parvarish
The Thief of Bagdad
Maharakshak: Aryan
Niyat
Tanaav
Karawas
Sony Entertainment Television
Parvarrish – Season 2
Shree Adi Manav
Police Factory
Ab Ayega Mazaa
Humari Sister Didi
Hum Hai Na
Ek Nayi Pehchaan
Love Marriage Ya Arranged Marriage
Parvarrish – Kuchh Khattee Kuchh Meethi
Adaalat
CID
Bhaskar Bharti
Amber Dhara
Ek Ladki Anjani Si
Jassi Jaisi Koi Nahin
Surya – The Super Cop
Just Mohabbat
Devi
Aahat
Dil Se Dosti
Jane Kaha Mera Jigar Gaya
Shikwa
Sunday Ke Sunday
Ladies Special
Love Main Kabhi Kabhi
Humsafars
Missing
&TV
Agent Raghav
Laal Ishq (2018 TV series)
Dilli Wali Thakur Gurls
Adhuri Kahani Hamari
Doordarshan
Dekh Bhai Dekh
Tehkikat
Kashma Kash
Baaje Paayal
Aasman Se Aage
Detective
Laxmi LLB
Maan
Samjauta
Sanam
Colors
Ashoka
Internet Wala Love
Silsila Badalte Rishton Ka
Mission Sapne
Veer Shivaji
Jane Kya Baat Hui
24 season 2
Life OK
Piya Rangrezz
Nadaan Parindey Ghar Aaja
Kaisa Yeh Ishq Hai... Ajab Sa Risk Hai
2613
2612
Ramleela – Ajay Devgn Ke Saath
Hum Ne Li Hai...Shapath
Channel V
Crazy Stupid Ishq
SAB TV
Jugni Challi Jalandhar
Lo Ho Gayi Pooja Iss Ghar Ki
I Love My India
Disney Channel
Kabhi Aise Geet gaya karo
Kya Mast Hai Life
Dhoom Machao Dhoom
Vicky aur Vetaal
NDTV Imagine
Ghar Ki Baat Hai
Home TV
Safar
MTV
Fannah
Bindass
Zindagi Wins
Hungama
Agdam Bagdam Tigdam
Misc
Agni Chakra
Jaal
Operation Flood
RET
Polimer TV
Sakthi Pola Yarumilla
Raj TV
Nilave Malare
Zee Tamil
Kaadhalukku Salam
Star Vijay
Idhu Kadhala
Deivam Thandha En Thangai

Year	Series Name	Producer	Director	Channel Name
2013	Vir The Robot Boy	Maya Digital studios		Hungama TV
2016	Shiva (TV series)	Viacom 18	Niraj Vikram	Nickelodeon (Indian TV channel)
2016	Chacha Bhatija (TV series)	Maya Digital Studios		Hungama TV
2017	Guru Aur Bhole: Season 3			Discovery Kids & Netflix
2017	Gattu and Battu			
2017	Bapu			Hotstar
2017	Selfie With Bajrangi	Deepa Sahi	Dheeraj Berry	Hotstar & Prime Video
2018	Little Singham	Rohit Shetty	Vikram Veturi	Discovery Kids & Netflix
2018	Inspector Chingum	Cosmos Maya		Amazon Prime Video
2019	Guddu the Great			Hotstar
2020	Motu Patlu	Viacom18	Suhas D. Kadav	Prime Video & Voot
2020	Lambu-G Tingu-G			Pogo (TV channel)
2020	Smaashhing Simmba	Rohit Shetty	Rohit Shetty	Pogo (TV channel).
2020	Fukrey Boyzzz Season 2	Prateek Santosh	Avinash Walzade	Discovery Kids & Netflix
2020	Dr. Tenali Rama			Hotstar
2021	Dabangg: The Animated Series	Arbaaz Khan		Cartoon Network & Hotstar

=== Web Series/Short Film ===
Year	Name	Platform	Notes
2016	Raakh	YouTube	Short Film
2017	Bulbul	YouTube	Short Film
2018	XXX	ALTBalaji	Web Series
2018	Haq Se	ALTBalaji	Web Series
2018	PM Selfiewallie	ALTBalaji	Web Series
2018	ROGAN JOSH	YouTube	Short Film
2019	Coldd Lassi Aur Chicken Masala	ALTBalaji and ZEE5	Web Series
2019	Fixerr	ALTBalaji and ZEE5	Web Series
2019	kaafir	ZEE5	Web Series
2020	Pawan & Pooja	MX Player	Web Series
2022	Bestseller	Amazon Prime	Web Series

=== Jingles Advertisement ===
- Ashok Masala
- Honda
- Hindutwa Newspaper
- T-Series Washing Powder
- Praful Sarees
- Protection Toothpaste
- Baba Zarda
- Shakti Company
- Rani Oil
- Wheel
- Red Label Tea
- Tata Tetley Tea
- Bharat Petroleum
- Prestige Whisky
- Afro Asian Games (2003)
- IIFA Awards
- Hello Chips
- T-Series Concorde Fans
- Surya Namak
- Lizole Detergent
- Essel Premium Basmati Rice
- Ok Saboon
- Spirit Sanitary Packs
- Free Of Mind
- Add Gel
- Snuggy
- Doodh Doodh
- Coke – Hritik
- Xenon
- Cell One
- Veera (2002)
- Chaini Chaini
- Mehek Smiling Doll
- Excotica

=== Channel Anthem ===
- EL TV
- ZEE TV
- Sony TV
- Channel 9
- B4U
- SET Max
- GURJARI
- LASHKARA
- Sony Mix
- SAB

== Personal life ==
Singh is married to Sherley Singh with two children.

His father Charanjit Singh Panesar was a musician who often played as a guitarist with R D Burman and his dad S D Burman. In 1982, armed with Roland gear, Singh set out to update the entrancing drone and whirling scales of classical Indian music with his record Ten Ragas to a Disco Beat. After nearly three decades of near-complete obscurity, the album resurfaced when Bombay Connection label impresario Edo Bouman snapped it up while travelling in India. After which he has been given the title 'the father of Acid House’ for the album.

His mother Gursharan Kaur Panesar a housewife was a painter and an artist.

== Awards and nominations ==
Singh and Aadesh Shrivastava received their first award together, The Gold Disc Award in the year 1988 for his album "golden star". 2009, he was awarded Mirchi Music Award – Best background score for the movie ‘Raaz: The Mystery Continues’. He won The Indian Telly Awards for Best title music & background score for Sahib Biwi Ghulam & Amber Dhara in 2005 and 2008 respectively. Recently he has achieved the 2015 PTC Punjabi Film Awards for the best background score for the movie "Punjab 1984" and The 2016 Golden Petal Award for background score – fiction Ashoka.

Year	Award	Works	Notes
1988	Gold Disc Award	The Album Golden Star	Won
2005	The Indian Telly Awards	Best Title Music & Background Score Sahib Biwi Gulam	Won
2006	The Indian Telly Awards	Title Singer for a TV Show Jabb Love Hua	Nominated
2007	The Indian Telly Awards	Best Music Director Jabb Love Hua	Nominated
2008	Star Guild	Best Title Song Boogie Woogie	Nominated
2008	The Indian Telly Awards	Best Title Music & Background Score Amber Dhara	Won
2009	Mirchi Music Awards	Best Background – Raaz: The Mystery Continues	Won
2012	Mirchi Music Awards	Background Score of the Year – Raaz 3D	Nominated
2012	Indian Telly Awards	Best Background music for a TV Program (fiction) – Parvarrish – Kuchh Khattee Kuchh Meethi	Nominated
2012	Indian Telly Awards	Best Background music for a TV Program (fiction) – Iss Pyaar Ko Kya Naam Doon?	Nominated
2013	Indian Telly Award	Best Background music for a TV Program (fiction) Sphereorigins Multivision Pvt Ltd	Nominated
2015	PTC Punjabi Film Awards	Best Background Score –Punjab 1984	Won
2015	PTC Punjabi Film Awards	Best Background Score –Jatt James Bond	Nominated
2016	Golden Petal Awards	Best Background Score – Fiction -Chakravartin Ashoka Samrat	Nominated
2016	PTC Punjabi Film Awards	Best Background Score –Shareek	Nominated
2019	PTC Punjabi Film Awards	Best Background Score –Harjeeta	Nominated
