= Ghulam (film) =

1998 Indian film by Vikram Bhatt

- Poster
- Directed by: Vikram Bhatt
- Written by: Anjum Rajabali
- Based on: On the Waterfront by Budd Schulberg
- Produced by: Mukesh Bhatt
- Starring: Aamir Khan; Rani Mukerji; Sharat Saxena; Deepak Tijori; Rajit Kapoor; Akshay Anand
- Cinematography: Teja
- Edited by: Waman Bhonsle
- Music by: Songs: Jatin–Lalit; Background score: Amar Haldipur
- Production company: Vishesh Films
- Distributed by: Vishesh Films
- Release date: 19 June 1998
- Running time: 162 minutes
- Country: India
- Language: Hindi
- Budget: ₹7.5 Crores
- Box office: ₹24.2 Crores

Ghulam (transl. Slave) is a 1998 Indian Hindi-language action film directed by Vikram Bhatt. The film stars Aamir Khan and Rani Mukerji in the lead roles. The plot of the film is similar to Vishesh Films' first production Kabzaa (1988), starring Sanjay Dutt, in turn inspired by Elia Kazan's On the Waterfront (1954; itself inspired by "Crime on the Waterfront" by Malcolm Johnson, a series of November–December 1948 articles published in the New York Sun).

Ghulam was released on 19 June 1998, and was a commercial success at the box office.

At the 44th Filmfare Awards, Ghulam received 6 nominations, including Best Film, Best Director (Bhatt) and Best Actor (Khan), and won Best Scene of the Year. The film was remade in Tamil in 2000 as Sudhandhiram.

== Plot ==
Siddharth "Siddhu" Marathe, a boxing champion from Mumbai, lives an aimless life. Overshadowed by his older brother Jai, the right-hand man of local gangster Raunak "Ronnie" Singh. Siddhu befriends and falls in love with Alisha, unaware that her brother, Hari, a principled social worker, opposes Ronnie's reign of terror. When Siddhu unwittingly lures Hari into a fatal ambush orchestrated by Ronnie, he is overcome with guilt but initially refuses to testify against Ronnie due to his loyalty to Jai.

After losing a boxing match on Jai's orders to protect Ronnie's illegal activities, Siddhu confronts his family's history of cowardice and resolves to fight injustice. Despite personal and emotional losses, including a breakup with Alisha and Jai's eventual murder by Ronnie, Siddhu testifies in court against Ronnie.

Siddhu challenges Ronnie to a public boxing duel, defeating him and inspiring the local community to stand against Ronnie's tyranny. The collective resistance forces Ronnie and his gang to flee, signaling the community's empowerment and Siddhu's transformation into a courageous leader.

== Cast ==
- Aamir Khan as Siddharth Marathe "Siddhu"
- Rani Mukerji as Alisha Mafatlal (voice dubbed by Mona Ghosh Shetty)
- Deepak Tijori as Charlie
- Sharat Saxena as Ronak Singh "Ronnie"
- Akshay Anand as Harihar "Hari" Mafatlal, Alisha's brother.
- Rajit Kapoor as Jaidev "Jai" Marathe, Siddharth's brother.
- Mita Vashisht as Siddharth's lawyer Fatima madam
- Dalip Tahil as Vishwanath Marathe, Siddharth's father. (special appearance)
- Raju Kher as Ashok Mafatlal, Alisha's father.
- Ashutosh Rana as Shyamsundar Agrawal (special appearance)
- Kamlesh Oza as Avinash
- Daya Shankar Pandey
- Amin Hajee as Black Tiger (boxing champion)
- Prithvi Zutshi
- Sheikh Sami
- Rahul Singh

== Production ==
Ghulam was announced in 1993, five years before it was released. Initially, Mahesh Bhatt was to direct the film. He had previously directed Aamir Khan in Dil Hai Ke Manta Nahin (1991) and Hum Hain Rahi Pyar Ke (1993). However, following a disagreement with Khan, Mahesh Bhatt stepped down as director and Vikram Bhatt took over.

Filming for Ghulam began in June 1997. By mid-August, a week-long schedule at a specially erected set at Film City in Mumbai was completed.

=== Dubbing ===
Rani Mukerji's voice was dubbed by Mona Shetty, who had a much more high-pitched voice. When asked if the director's decision to not use her voice in the film affected her, she said that her voice was dubbed as it "did not suit the character".

=== Stunts ===
A sequence in the film shows Aamir running on a rail track towards an oncoming train, which misses him by a few feet as he jumps off the tracks. 1.3 seconds was the only difference between Aamir and the train. This stunt was actually performed by Aamir himself. At the 44th Filmfare Awards, it won the Best Scene of the Year award, but Aamir later criticized himself for taking such an unnecessary risk. Editor Waman Bhonsle's work in this scene is considered among the best in Hindi cinema to date.

== Soundtrack ==
Ghulam

Studio album by Jatin–Lalit
- Released: 8 March 1998
- Genres: Feature film soundtrack; Bollywood
- Length: 33:12
- Language: Hindi
- Label: Tips Music

Jatin–Lalit chronology
| Dhoondte Reh Jaaoge! (1998) | Ghulam (1998) | Jab Pyaar Kisise Hota Hai (1998) |

The music was composed by Jatin–Lalit. Lyrics were handled by Indeevar, Nitin Raikwar, Sameer and Vinod Mahendra. The film's soundtrack album sold 2.5 million units in India, making it the year's fifth best-selling Bollywood soundtrack album.

| No. | Title | Singer(s) | Length |
|---|---|---|---|
| 1. | "Aankhon Se Tune Yeh Kya Keh Diya" | Kumar Sanu, Alka Yagnik | 05:06 |
| 2. | "Jadoo Hai Tera Hi Jadoo" | Kumar Sanu, Alka Yagnik | 07:53 |
| 3. | "Ab Naam Mohabbat Ke" | Udit Narayan, Alka Yagnik | 05:18 |
| 4. | "Aati Kya Khandala" | Aamir Khan, Alka Yagnik | 04:11 |
| 5. | "Saath Jo Tera Mil Gaya" | Udit Narayan, Alka Yagnik | 05:26 |
| 6. | "Tujhko Kya" | Udit Narayan, Jojo, Surjeet | 06:09 |
| Total length: | | | 33:42 |

== Reception ==
The film was declared a "hit" by Box Office India and its total gross was 242 million.

== Awards ==
| Awards | Category | Recipient(s) | Results |
|---|---|---|---|
| 44th Filmfare Awards | Best Film | Mukesh Bhatt | Nominated |
| 44th Filmfare Awards | Best Director | Vikram Bhatt | Nominated |
| 44th Filmfare Awards | Best Actor | Aamir Khan | Nominated |
| 44th Filmfare Awards | Best Villain | Sharat Saxena | Nominated |
| 44th Filmfare Awards | Best Male Playback Singer | Aamir Khan for "Aati Kya Khandala" | Nominated |
| 44th Filmfare Awards | Best Scene of the Year | Biju Dhanapalan for The Train-race scene | Won |
| Zee Cine Awards | Best Actor | Aamir Khan | Nominated |
| Zee Cine Awards | Best Actress | Rani Mukerji | Nominated |

== Remake ==
The film was remade in Tamil in 2000 as Sudhandhiram. The remake rights were sold for ₹25 lakh (equivalent to ₹1.2 crore or US$130,000 in 2026).
