= Raakh (2016 film) =

- Directed by: Milap Zaveri
- Written by: Milap Zaveri
- Screenplay by: Milap Zaveri
- Story by: Milap Zaveri
- Produced by: Komal Kewlani; Sandeep Kewlani
- Starring: Vir Das; Richa Chadda; Shaad Randhawa
- Music by: Raju Singh
- Production companies: Waterlily Films & Write Direction Films
- Distributed by: T-Series
- Release date: 7 November 2016
- Running time: 22 minutes
- Country: India
- Language: Hindi

Raakh (English: Ashes) is a 2016 Indian short crime drama film written and directed by Milap Zaveri, starring Vir Das, Richa Chadda and Shaad Randhawa in the lead roles. The film revolves around a man who seeks revenge from the guy who raped and killed his wife. The film was released by T-Series on 7 November 2016.

== Plot ==
A man (Vir Das) arrives at a strange place with a driller and locking up the door. He has held another man (Shaad Randhawa) captive and heavily bloodied. Upon asking who's he and the reason for keeping him captive like this, the hero shows a video of his wife (Richa Chadda) through a projector. He tells him that he will seek revenge from him for killing his wife. He goes and starts eating while the villain tells him what he did with her.

After he finishes eating, he stands up and takes a gun, but tells the villain that he knows he won't plead for his life, but certainly he will, for the life of someone else, i.e., the hero because no one except the hero knew about the place and neither does any sound good our normal any external sound comes in. Realizing it, the villain begins to plead him not to commit suicide and that he (hero) shouldn't kill himself because he has not done wrong and he shouldn't die. The hero finally shoots himself to his death and falls dead, as blood splashed from his head splatters on the projector screen, still playing his wife's video.

The villain is left crying for his life and the titles appear with a song.

== Cast ==
- Vir Das
- Richa Chadda
- Shaad Randhawa

== Release ==
Raakh was released on 7 November 2016 by T-Series.

== Critical reception ==
Ruchita Mishra from Glamsham rated it 3.5/5, and wrote "Watch it if you love dark and thriller stories." Subhash K. Jha rated the film 3/5 and quoted "Nonetheless Raakh has much to recommend itself. It’s shot in a grimy squalid location that represents and nails the characters’ state of mind. These are two people who are doomed to die. What they say to each other is not important. What they’ve done to one another’s life is really the issue here.In the pursuit of perverse justice this short film goes a long way."

Rachit Gupta from Filmfare rated it 2.5/5, and stated "Like two-line horror stories go, Raakh creates its terror with planting a thought in your head." He also wrote that the film has "Fiery visuals but the story runs out of spark." Nishi Tiwari from Mumbai Mirror rated it 1.5/5, calling it a film "Microwaved to imperfection."
