= Shagufta Rafique =

Bollywood film director

- Born: 20 September 1965; Mumbai, India
- Occupations: Screenwriter, Director
- Years active: 2006 - Present
- Relatives: Sayeeda Khan (sister)

Shagufta Rafique is an Indian film screenwriter and film director.

== Biography ==
Shagufta was an adopted child. Her parents are unknown. Her foster mother was in a relationship with a Kolkata based businessman, who left his second family unsupported after his death. His sudden death brought the family into poverty and Shagufta had to start supporting family at a young age of 11 by dancing at private parties. Her mother also trained her as a classical dancer. Aged 17, Rafique married a wealthy man to get some financial stability in her life, however, the union did not work well. She finally broke up and turned to prostitution, before going on to work as a bar dancer to make a living. As a bar dancer she worked in Bombay before moving to Dubai. At the age of 25, one of her Pakistani fans who was 20 years her senior offered to marry her and Shagufta agreed, and he died before the marriage could happen. This led her to writing, and she became a storyteller.

Shagufta initially joined Mahesh Bhatt's production company, Vishesh Films, where she wrote eleven films. After working for many films as a writer and screenwriter, she made her directorial debut with the Bengali action thriller film, Mon Jaane Na which was released on Holi 2019.

== Filmography ==
=== Bengali ===
Denotes films that have not yet been released

Year	Film	Language	Director	Story	Screenplay	Dialogues
2019	Mon Jaane Na	Bengali	Yes	Yes	Yes	Yes

=== Hindi ===
Denotes films that have not yet been released

Year	Film	Language	Director	Story	Screenplay	Dialogues
2006	Woh Lamhe	Hindi			Yes	Yes
2007	Awarapan	Hindi			Yes	Yes
2007	Dhokha	Hindi			Yes	Yes
2007	Showbiz	Hindi			Yes	
2009	Raaz – The Mystery Continues	Hindi			Yes	Yes
2009	Jashnn – The Music Within	Hindi			Yes	Yes
2010	Kajraare	Hindi				Yes
2011	Murder 2	Hindi			Yes	Yes
2012	Jannat 2	Hindi		Yes	Yes	
2012	Jism 2	Hindi				Yes
2012	Raaz 3D	Hindi		Yes	Yes	Yes
2013	Aashiqui 2	Hindi		Yes		
2013	Ankur Arora Murder Case	Hindi				Yes
2015	Mr. X	Hindi		Yes		Yes
2015	Hamari Adhuri Kahani	Hindi				Yes
2015	Alone	Hindi			Yes	
n/a	Dushman	Punjabi	Yes	Yes		
2017-18	Tu Aashiqui	Hindi	TV show on Colors TV Concept and Broadstory			

=== Telugu ===
Denotes films that have not yet been released

Year	Film	Language	Director	Story	Screenplay	Dialogues
2014	Nee Jathaga Nenundali	Telugu		Yes		
