= Raaz (2002 film) =

2002 Indian film by Vikram Bhatt

- Theatrical release poster
- Directed by: Vikram Bhatt
- Written by: Mahesh Bhatt; Girish Dhamija
- Story by: Vikram Bhatt
- Produced by: Mukesh Bhatt; Kumar S. Taurani; Ramesh S. Taurani
- Starring: Dino Morea; Bipasha Basu; Malini Sharma; Ashutosh Rana
- Narrated by: Mahesh Bhatt
- Cinematography: Pravin Bhatt
- Edited by: Amit Saxena
- Music by: Nadeem-Shravan
- Production companies: Vishesh Films; Tips Industries
- Distributed by: Tips Industries
- Release date: 1 February 2002
- Running time: 152 minutes
- Country: India
- Language: Hindi
- Budget: ₹5 crore
- Box office: ₹37.59 crore

Raaz (transl. Secret) is a 2002 Indian Hindi-language supernatural horror film directed by Vikram Bhatt. The film stars Dino Morea and Bipasha Basu in lead roles, with Malini Sharma and Ashutosh Rana in supporting roles. In the Indian media, the film is widely regarded as a landmark in the history of Indian cinema and considered one of the best Hindi horror films. (Note: Multiple References:) The film is an unofficial adaptation of the American film What Lies Beneath (2000). American entertainment publication Collider has termed it better than the original.

The story follows Aditya (Dino) and Sanjana (Bipasha) retreat to Ooty to mend their broken marriage, but their new home harbors more than silence — a ghost with unfinished business. As the haunting deepens, Sanjana uncovers a chilling truth: the greatest threat may be the man she is trying to save.

It was a major commercial and critical success emerging as second-highest-grossing film of the year 2002 being the most profitable venture and the first instalment in the Raaz series. Morea and Basu won a Zee Cine Award in the category of Dynamic Duo. The film earned a nomination for Best Film at the 48th Filmfare Awards. Nadeem-Shravan's music also earned them several Filmfare Award nominations. The film was shot in places across Ooty including The Lawrence School, Lovedale. The voices for the leading cast were dubbed by professional artists; Mona Ghosh Shetty dubbed for Basu, Namrata Sawhney dubbed for Sharma, and Bhatt himself dubbed for Morea.

A spiritual sequel to the film was released on 23 January 2009, under the title Raaz: The Mystery Continues and the third installment of the series titled Raaz 3 was released in 3D on 7 September 2012. A fourth film, Raaz Reboot, was released on 16 September 2016.

== Plot ==
In the mist-covered forests near Ooty, a college picnic turns into a chilling tragedy when Nisha, a medical student, suddenly attacks her boyfriend in a violent, inexplicable outburst and dies moments later. The mysterious nature of her death baffles the police, who call on Professor Agni Swaroop, a reclusive occult expert. Swaroop's investigation reveals that Nisha was possessed by a malevolent spirit, awakened by unresolved secrets buried deep within the forest.

Meanwhile, in Mumbai, Sanjana and Aditya Dhanraj are a married couple struggling to save their deteriorating relationship. Aditya, a successful yet emotionally distant businessman, is preoccupied with work, creating a rift between them. To salvage their marriage, they plan a retreat to Ooty, choosing a secluded, abandoned colonial bungalow near the forest where Nisha's death occurred—an ominous setting that soon reveals a darker presence.

Shortly after arrival, Sanjana begins to experience terrifying supernatural phenomena: ghostly screams from the forest, eerie whispers, and vivid nightmares. The local staff reveal the disappearance of Robert, the previous caretaker, who vanished after being tormented by the same malevolent force. Sanjana asked Aditya about Robert but ignored. Sanjana confides in her friend Priya, who introduces her to Professor Swaroop.

Using an ancient occult ritual—a lemon that inexplicably turns blood red at sunset—Swaroop confirms the presence of a dark spirit tethered to the bungalow and forest. Their further investigation leads to the discovery of a buried revolver registered to Colonel Arjun Malik. The Colonel reveals that the weapon belonged to his daughter, Malini, a troubled young woman with a severe psychiatric illness who mysteriously disappeared years ago.

During a séance, Sanjana uncovers the vengeful truth: years earlier, Aditya had an extramarital affair with Malini during a rough patch in his marriage. When Aditya refused to leave Sanjana for Malini, the devastated Malini fatally shot herself in his presence, intending to frame him. Fearing scandal, Aditya conspired with Robert, the caretaker, to secretly bury Malini's body in the forest, hiding the tragic event.

Malini's restless spirit awakens, fueled by feelings of betrayal and injustice, and its vengeful haunting intensifies. The ghost impersonates Sanjana to sow mistrust and lures Aditya into the deadly forest. Under Malini's influence, Aditya is involved in a harrowing car accident, falling off a cliff and becoming critically injured.

Aditya's internal conflict and guilt over his betrayal clash with Sanjana's fear and love. Their strained relationship becomes a battleground against the supernatural force threatening to destroy them both.

Determined to break the curse, Sanjana, Priya, and Swaroop enter the forest to confront Malini's wrath. In a tragic turn, Swaroop is killed and possessed by the spirit. They also find Robert's decomposed body hanging from a tree, evidence of the spirit's deadly power.

In a dramatic, Sanjana faces the fully possessed Swaroop in a battle of wills against the supernatural. Drawing strength from her love for Aditya and her newfound courage, she recites an ancient incantation taught by Swaroop. As flames roar around Malini's grave, Sanjana douses it with petrol and sets it ablaze, igniting a blazing inferno that lights the dark forest in an otherworldly glow.

At the same time, a weakened but determined Aditya fights his way back from the brink of death to join Sanjana. Together, amidst swirling fire and howling wind, they confront the vengeful spirit. The ghost's shrieks dissolve into silence as the flames consume her remains, breaking the curse at last.

After the terrifying ordeal, Sanjana and Aditya rebuilt their bond, replacing guilt with forgiveness and love. They left the past behind and started anew, eventually welcoming a healthy baby boy. Their lives filled with joy and harmony, leaving dark memories far away as they embraced a bright future together.

== Cast ==
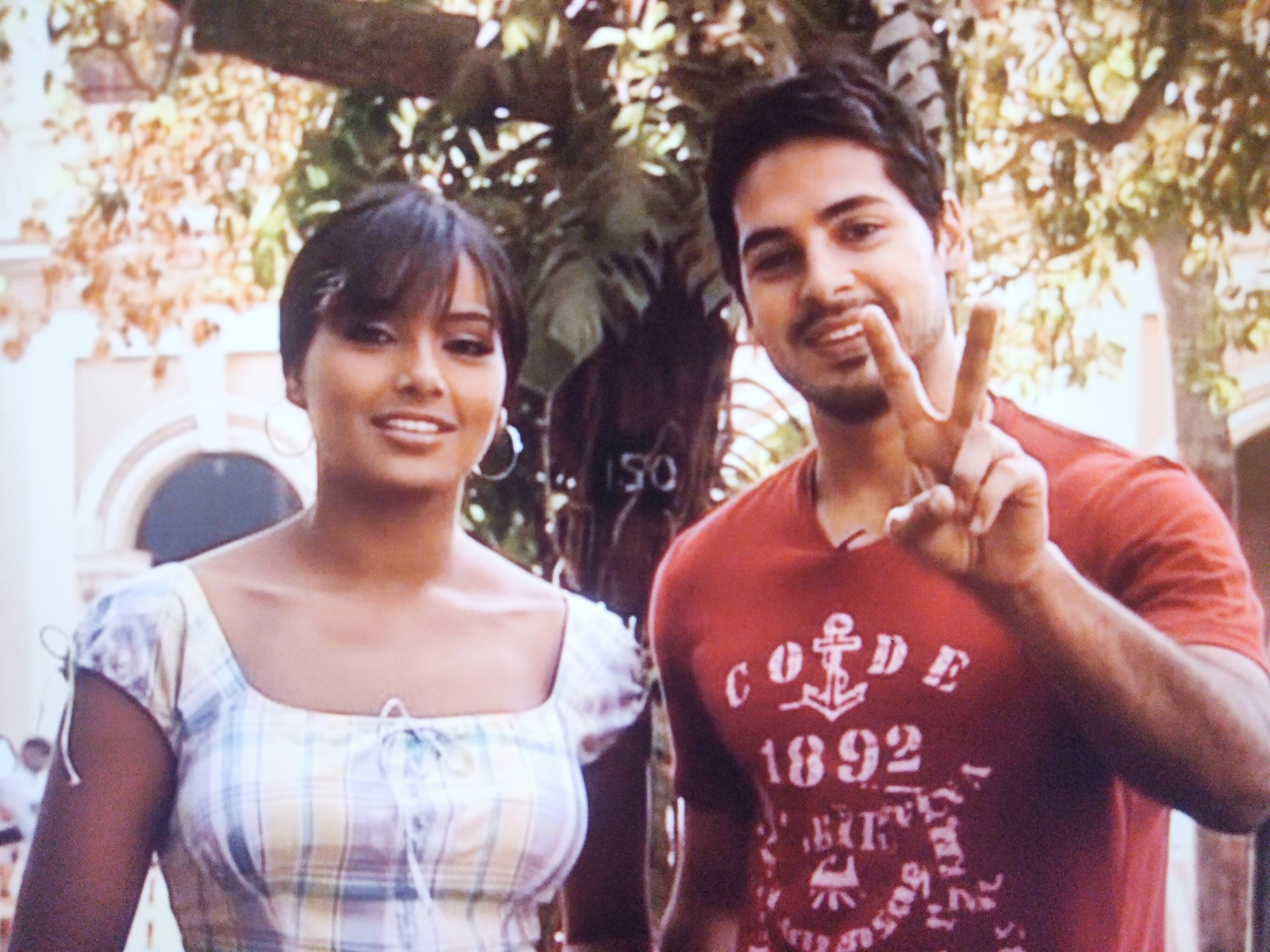
Dino Morea and Bipasha Basu essayed the roles of Aditya Dhanraj and Sanjana Dhanraj respectively
- Dino Morea as Aditya Dhanraj
- Bipasha Basu as Sanjana Dhanraj
- Malini Sharma as Malini Malik
- Ashutosh Rana as Professor Agni Swaroop
- Shruti Ulfat as Priya
- Vishwajeet Pradhan as Ajay, Priya's husband
- Mink Brar as Nisha
- Ali Asgar as Rohit, Nisha's boyfriend
- Masood Akhtar as Robert
- Pratima Kazmi as Robert's wife
- Anang Desai as Mr Dhanraj, Aditya's father
- Neha Bam as Mrs Dhanraj, Aditya's mother
- Murli Sharma as Police Inspector
- Yusuf Hussain as a doctor treating Nisha
- Ishwar Patel
- Kiran Randhawa

== Production ==
=== Casting ===
Anil Kapoor was initially approached for the male lead but declined the offer. Then it was offered to Hrithik Roshan who also declined it. Portions of the film were reportedly shot with Lisa Ray in the lead role; however, she later opted out of the project. Eventually, Bipasha Basu and Dino Morea, who were in a real-life relationship at the time, were cast in the lead roles. Dino later remarked that their off-screen bond translated into on-screen chemistry, which became essential to the film's emotional core.

The supporting cast included Malini Sharma, making her acting debut, and Ashutosh Rana as Professor Agni Swaroop, a paranormal investigator.

=== Development ===
The film was primarily shot in Ooty, with its misty forests and colonial bungalows offering a fittingly eerie setting. Key scenes were filmed at The Lawrence School, Lovedale. Additional sequences were shot in a Mumbai suburb, with romantic portions filmed in Switzerland, and select visuals in California to enhance cinematic appeal. The film embraced a gothic visual style—favoring fog, shadows, and silence over CGI—to evoke psychological tension.

==== Incidents ====
The now-closed Fern Hill Hotel besides Ooty lake was infamous for its eerie, supernatural reputation long before the movie shoot began. Basu and Morea revealed they had heard chilling tales from industry veterans like Sanjay Dutt and choreographer Saroj Khan about the lodging.

Late one night, Bipasha Basu's dance troupe was awakened by the sound of furniture moving in a room above, despite there being no actual upper floor. Staff confirmed there was indeed no floor above.

=== Inspiration ===
The inspiration for the film closely linked to Mukesh Textile Mills, a deserted mill in Colaba, Mumbai, widely regarded as one of the most haunted locations in India.

According to reports, while shooting at Mukesh Mills, director Vikram Bhatt heard and captured a mysterious female voice even though no one was present nearby. He used the voice in the film. This supernatural encounter is considered the origin of Raaz and remains one of the most cited examples of a real-life paranormal experience influencing a Bollywood horror film. Disturbed by the incident, he shared the experience with producer Mahesh Bhatt, who later used it as the basis for the film's plot.

The poster of the film draws inspiration from the gothic visual style of Sleepy Hollow (1999), reflected in its dark palette, mystery imagery, and supernatural mood.

== Box office ==
Raaz released on 1 February 2002 and grossed ₹37.59 crore.

== Artistry and legacy ==
=== Cultural impacts ===
Raaz is widely considered a milestone in the evolution of horror cinema in Bollywood. It became first mainstream Bollywood horror film to receive a Filmfare Awards nomination, establishing the genre's credibility and influencing future horror-romance cinema. It combined supernatural themes with emotional drama, romance, and a chart-topping soundtrack, paving the way for horror films to enter mainstream Hindi cinema. The film's artistic choices and box office impact have secured it a cult status marked as a significant departure from earlier horror tropes. It was the only blockbuster film in 2002.

The film received notable international attention when Paul McCartney attended a screening of the film and expressed admiration for its lead performances by Bipasha Basu and Dino Morea. He reportedly praised Basu's portrayal and described her as “India’s Sophia Loren”.

The lead performances by Bipasha Basu and Dino Morea contributed significantly to the film's popularity, earning the duo a Zee Cine Award for "Dynamic Duo" and Screen Award for "Jodi no. 1" . It established Basu as "scream queen", while positioning Dino as a "romantic hero", with their on-screen chemistry becoming a key highlight of the film. Basu and Morea's separation soon after Raaz added a poignant layer to the film's legacy, making their on-screen high-profile relationship all the more spellbinder and remarkable.

The film left a lasting legacy as India's first modern horror blockbuster. It was instrumental in reviving the horror genre in Bollywood, which had largely been dominated by low-budget productions throughout the 1980s and 1990s. With its mainstream appeal, polished production values, and a strong narrative inspired by Hollywood's What Lies Beneath, Raaz reintroduced horror as a commercially viable genre to Indian audiences. Director Vikram Bhatt acknowledged Raaz as a turning point in his career, leading him to explore horror in many subsequent films.

American legendary filmmaker and actor Elia Kazan once remarked that audiences are like hounds—they can sense a good film from a mile away. We had no idea that Raaz would go on to become such a phenomenal success. There was no grand prediction, no formula—just a strong feeling that we were creating something meaningful, something that felt right. Sometimes, that instinct is all you have, and when it connects with the audience, the became more than a film; it became a benchmark for Indian horror.

— Vikram Bhatt

=== Influences ===
==== India ====
Media outlets recognized Raaz as a breakthrough film in Bollywood horror. It appears on various lists of top Indian horror films, including those by Filmfare, which named it among the best Bollywood horror films of the past two decades, Indian Express, regarded it among best horror film in Indian cinema, Open Magazine, positioning as a pioneer of a new subgenre and named "Best cult classic horror film, India Today, listed the film among best horror film ever made, Indiatimes, cited it among Bollywood’s best horror movies, Hindustan Times, recognised it as best romantic horror film. The IIFA also ranked Raaz first among best Bollywood horror films. Times now noted the film for being scarier than The Conjuring. The Print featured Raaz as a milestone for Indian horror. The strategic fusion was highlighted by Mint, which placed it among the "Ten Bollywood horror films that redefined the genre." ScoopWhoop, emphasized the film's mastery and called "one of the best ever in Bollywood horror".

==== International ====
It garnered significant attention and acclaim beyond India, earning recognition from several prominent international media outlets and film institutions. American entertainment publication Collider has marked it better than the original. Forbes emphasized and challenged prevailing notions that horror was unviable for the Indian mainstream. It termed the film as "Bollywood’s horror revival." Pakistani daily Dawn marked it as best horror film of the decade. The Wire situates Raaz in a lineage of romantic horror films that redefined visual horror in Hindi film industry. International media platform Mashable, called it a "Revolution in Hindi Horror". The Gulf News, acknowledged as the film that legitimized Bollywood horror. In Maldives in 2003, Raaz was remade and tittled Ginihila.

The film's success spawned a franchise with sequels—Raaz: The Mystery Continues (2009), Raaz 3D (2012), and Raaz Reboot (2016)—though none matched the original's acclaim.

British Film Institute noted the film for its genre-blending approach, integrating elements of romance and melodrama into a horror narrative, thereby broadening its appeal and influencing future Indian horror films.

== Reception ==
The film received positive reviews from the critics. Shah Rukh Khan praised Morea's performance and said "Your film is really doing well". Webindia123.com said that Raaz is "something different from the current trend...Raaz is a psycho-thriller worth a look". The film was praised because of its unique story. Taran Adarsh of Bollywood Hungama rated it 2 out of 5 stars, noting that while Raaz was a well-crafted film with the right combination for a psycho-thriller, it fully met expectations. The Indian Express praised Raaz for successfully reviving the horror genre in Bollywood, highlighting its ability to blend supernatural suspense with emotional drama. India Today described the film as a trendsetter that made horror commercially viable and stylish for the Indian culture.

== Awards ==
List of awards and nominations received by Raaz
| Year | Award Ceremony | Category | Nominee(s) | Result |
|---|---|---|---|---|
| 2002 | Star Screen Awards | Best Duo | Dino Morea and Bipasha Basu | Won |
| 2002 | Star Screen Awards | Best Cinematography | Sameer Arya | Nominated |
| 2002 | Star Screen Awards | Best Music Director | Nadeem–Shravan | Nominated |
| 2003 | 48th Filmfare Awards | Best Film | Vishesh Films and Tips Industries | Nominated |
| 2003 | 48th Filmfare Awards | Best Director | Vikram Bhatt | Nominated |
| 2003 | 48th Filmfare Awards | Best Actress | Bipasha Basu | Nominated |
| 2003 | 48th Filmfare Awards | Best Music Director | Nadeem–Shravan | Nominated |
| 2003 | 48th Filmfare Awards | Best Lyricist | Sameer – "Aapke Pyaar Mein" | Nominated |
| 2003 | 48th Filmfare Awards | Best Female Playback Singer | Alka Yagnik – "Aapke Pyaar Mein" | Nominated |
| 2003 | 48th Filmfare Awards | Best Debut | Malini Sharma | Nominated |
| 2003 | Zee Cine Awards | Best Actor – Male | Dino Morea | Nominated |
| 2003 | Zee Cine Awards | Dynamic Duo | Dino Morea and Bipasha Basu | Won |
| 2003 | Zee Cine Awards | Best Actress | Bipasha Basu | Nominated |
| 2003 | Zee Cine Awards | Best Music Director | Nadeem–Shravan | Won |
| 2003 | Zee Cine Awards | Best Screenplay | Mukesh Bhatt | Won |
| 2003 | IIFA Awards | Best Screenplay | Mukesh Bhatt | Won |
| 2003 | IIFA Awards | Best Female Playback Singer | Alka Yagnik – "Aapke Pyaar Mein" | Nominated |
| 2003 | IIFA Awards | Best Music Director | Nadeem–Shravan | Nominated |
| 2003 | IIFA Awards | Best Supporting Actor | Ashutosh Rana | Won |
| 2003 | V Shantaram Annual Film Award | Best actor | Dino Morea | Won |
| 2003 | Stardust Awards | Best Director | Vikram Bhatt | Won |
| 2003 | Stardust Awards | Best Music Director (tie) | Nadeem Saifi & Shravan Rathod | Won |
| 2003 | Channel V Music Awards | Best Romantic Song | Alka Yagnik & Udit Narayan | Won |
| 2003 | MTV India Music Awards | Best Album of the Year | Raaz (soundtrack) | Nominated |
| 2003 | Bollywood Music Awards | Best Background Score | Nadeem–Shravan | Won |
| 2003 | Sansui Viewers' Choice | Best Film Series | Raaz | Nominated |

== Music ==
Raaz

Soundtrack album by Nadeem–Shravan
- Released: 8 December 2001
- Recorded: 2001
- Genre: Film soundtrack
- Length: 45:23
- Language: Hindi
- Label: Tips Official
- Producer: Nadeem-Shravan

The music of Raaz was released on December 8, 2001 and was composed by the duo Nadeem–Shravan, while the lyrics were penned by Sameer. Singers Udit Narayan, Alka Yagnik, Abhijeet, Sarika Kapoor, Jolly Mukherjee and Bali Brahmbhatt lent their voices for the songs. It was the third best selling Bollywood soundtrack album of the year and its songs gained huge popularity and became huge hits. According to the Indian trade website Box Office India, the soundtrack sold 30,00,000 units, contributing to the film's Blockbuster success.

All lyrics are written by Sameer; all music is composed by Nadeem–Shravan.

| No. | Title | Singer(s) | Length |
|---|---|---|---|
| 1. | "Aapke Pyaar Mein Hum" | Alka Yagnik | 5:28 |
| 2. | "Jo Bhi Kasmein" | Udit Narayan & Alka Yagnik | 5:40 |
| 3. | "Kitna Pyaara Hai" | Udit Narayan & Alka Yagnik | 4:21 |
| 4. | "Main Agar Saamne" | Abhijeet & Alka Yagnik | 5:46 |
| 5. | "Itna Main Chaahoon" | Udit Narayan & Alka Yagnik | 5:21 |
| 6. | "Mujhe Tere Jaise" | Udit Narayan & Sarika Kapoor | 5:25 |
| 7. | "Yeh Sheher Hai" | Suzzan, Jolly Mukherjee & Bali Brahmbhatt | 4:53 |
| 8. | "Pyaar Se Pyar Hum" | Abhijeet | 5:30 |
| 9. | "Yeh Sheher Hai (Remix)" | Suzzan, Jolly Mukherjee & Bali Brahmbhatt | 2:50 |
| Total length: | | | 45:23 |

== Release ==
The film was dubbed in Tamil as Rahasyam.

== Sequels and spin-offs ==
The commercial success of Raaz, produced on an estimated ₹5 crore budget and earning over ₹37 crore worldwide, led to the development of the long-running Raaz horror franchise. Although the subsequent instalments do not continue the original narrative, they retain key motifs such as supernatural hauntings, psychological trauma, and secrets from the past resurfacing to threaten the present.

Film commentators have frequently regarded Raaz (2002) as the strongest entry in the series; as one retrospective observed, “The original ‘Raaz’ still stands as the most atmospheric and accomplished film of the franchise, setting a standard its sequels never fully replicated.”

The first sequel, Raaz: The Mystery Continues (2009), starring Emraan Hashmi, Kangana Ranaut, and Adhyayan Suman, introduced themes of premonition, spiritual conflict, and social anxiety. Despite being unrelated to the original plot, it maintained the franchise's signature supernatural tone.

The third film, Raaz 3 (2012), starring Bipasha Basu, Emraan Hashmi, and Esha Gupta, adopted a darker occult narrative surrounding an actress who turns to black magic to destroy her rival. It was one of the highest-grossing Indian horror films.

The fourth entry, Raaz: Reboot (2016), starred Kriti Kharbanda and Emraan Hashmi, and introduced a new standalone narrative set in Romania. It explored themes of marital betrayal, possession, and unresolved guilt. While reviews were mixed, the film was noted for its gothic visual style.

The international impact of Raaz extended to the Maldivian film industry, inspiring the 2003 horror film Ginihila, considered an unofficial remake of the 2002 original.

Although a fifth film has been confirmed and has been announced by Vishesh Films. Bhatt claimed that Dino Morea and Bipasha Basu could return for a potential fifth instalment, with many viewers expressing interest in a direct continuation of the storyline from the original 2002 film.

== See also ==
- Ginihila, a 2003 Maldivian remake
- List of cult films
- List of highest-grossing Indian films
- List of Hindi horror films
