= Pravin Bhatt =

Indian film cinematographer, director and screenwriter

Pravin Bhatt (Praveen Bhatt) is an Indian film cinematographer, director and screenwriter, who has worked in Hindi cinema from 1970s to 2010s and shot most of the films directed by Mahesh Bhatt, like Arth (1982) and Aashiqui (1990) and his son Vikram Bhatt, Raaz (2002). He has also shot films like Umrao Jaan (1981), Masoom (1983) and Agneepath (1990).

== Career ==
Bhatt started his career as a cameraman in Maa Baap (1960), followed by Hariyali Aur Rasta (1962) directed by his father Vijay Bhatt, who gave him break as a cinematographer in his next feature film, Himalay Ki Godmein (1965), he went on to work in many more films of his father, establishing his career as a cinematographer. Then starting with Lahu Ke Do Rang (1979), he shot most of Mahesh Bhatt's films, this was followed by his son Vikram Bhatt's film. He was the cinematographer of India's first horror film Haunted 3D. Shaapit (2010) marked his 100th film as a cinematographer.

In 1984, Bhatt made his directorial debut with Bhavna starring Shabana Azmi and Marc Zuber as the leads, and Azmi won Filmfare Best Actress Award for the film.

== Personal life ==
He is the son of producer-director Vijay Bhatt, and also the father of director Vikram Bhatt.

== Filmography ==
Cinematographer

- Himalay Ki God Mein (1965)
- Ram Rajya (1967)
- Hira Aur Patthar (1977)
- Badalte Rishtey (1978)
- Lahu Ke Do Rang (1979)
- Umrao Jaan (1981)
- Kaalia (1981)
- Khud-Daar (1982)
- Arth (1982)
- Masoom (1983)
- Kamla (1985)
- Janam (1985)
- Aitbaar (1985)
- Yaadon Ki Kasam (1985)
- Sultanat (1986)
- Naam (1986)
- Kaash (1987)
- Gangaa Jamunaa Saraswati (1988)
- Joshilaay (1989)
- Agneepath (1990)
- Aashiqui (1990)
- Dil Hai Ke Manta Nahin (1991)
- Saathi (1991)
- Yodha (1991)
- Sadak (1991)
- Phir Teri Kahani Yaad Aayee (1993)
- Sir (1993)
- Hum Hain Rahi Pyar Ke (1993)
- Gumrah (1993)
- Naaraaz (1994)
- Haunted – 3D (2011)
- Kasoor (2001)
- Raaz (2002)
- Awara Paagal Deewana (2002)
- Aap Mujhe Achche Lagne Lage (2002)
- Footpath (2003)
- Inteha (2003)
- Aetbaar (2004)
- Elaan (2005)
- Jurm (2005)
- Deewane Huye Paagal (2005)
- Ankahee (2006)
- Red: The Dark Side (2007)
- Life Mein Kabhie Kabhiee (2007)
- Speed (2007)
- 1920 (2008)
- Three: Love, Lies, Betrayal (2009)
- Shaapit (2010)
- Haunted – 3D (2011)
- Phhir (2011)
- Dangerous Ishhq (2012)
- Raaz 3D (2012)
- Creature 3D (2014)

Director

- (film) (1984)
- Khoon Bahaa Ganga Mein (1988)
- Ek Hi Maqsad (1988)
