= Raaz 3: The Third Dimension =

2012 Indian film by Vikram Bhatt

- Theatrical release poster
- Directed by: Vikram Bhatt
- Written by: Shagufta Rafique
- Produced by: Mahesh Bhatt (Presenter); Mukesh Bhatt
- Starring: Bipasha Basu; Emraan Hashmi; Esha Gupta
- Narrated by: Emraan Hashmi
- Cinematography: Pravin Bhatt; 3D Stereographer; Michael Flax
- Edited by: Kuldip K. Mehan
- Music by: Original Songs: Jeet Gannguli; Rashid Khan; Background Score: Raju Singh
- Production company: Vishesh Films
- Distributed by: Zee Cinema
- Release date: 7 September 2012
- Running time: 139 minutes
- Country: India
- Language: Hindi
- Budget: ₹25 crore
- Box office: ₹101.1 crore

Raaz 3: The Third Dimension is a 2012 Indian Hindi-language supernatural horror film directed by Vikram Bhatt, and co-produced by Mahesh Bhatt and Mukesh Bhatt. The film stars Bipasha Basu as the lead and antagonist, alongside Emraan Hashmi and Esha Gupta. The film is the third instalment in the Raaz series. Bipasha Basu, who was a part of the first film of the Raaz series, made a comeback to the series after opting out of the second film. The film revolves around an actress (Shanaya Shekhar) played by Basu, who was once on top of everyone before becoming someone slowly fading away; therefore, to keep her spotlight, she turns to black magic to destroy the career and personal life of a rival actress (Sanjana Krishna), played by Gupta. In the process of her evil desires, she loses her lover (Aditya Arora), played by Hashmi.

== Plot ==
Shanaya Shekhar is an influential Bollywood actress secretly dating famous Bollywood film director Aditya Arora. Her career begins to decline when a debutant actress named Sanjana Krishna starts gaining popularity. Shanaya seems forgotten, and everybody wants to work with Sanjana. Shanaya's envy makes her turn to black magic to destroy Sanjana's career and take her place again.

Shanaya seeks the help of her former servant, Sonu, a tantrik who calls upon a black magician named Tara Dutt. Tara agrees to torture Sanjana and instructs to give Sanjana poison through a person she trusts. Shanaya convinces Aditya to do it for her. Aditya agrees due to his love for Shanaya and poisons Sanjana with the black magic through her glass of water. Sanjana begins to hallucinate at home and during shooting. When her maid Nandini becomes possessed and commits suicide, Aditya is horrified and realizes that what he's doing is immoral.

Aditya, whose sympathy for Sanjana has now turned into love, leaves Shanaya. Shanaya blackmails Aditya and threatens his relationship with Sanjana to force him to continue helping. It is also revealed that Sanjana and Shanaya are actually half-sisters; Shanaya was neglected by her father and all the love and affection was given to Sanjana, making Shanaya bitter.

At a movie premiere, Shanaya, who gave Sanjana chocolates laced with the black magic poison, watches as Sanjana hallucinates being swarmed by cockroaches. Panicking and on the verge of a breakdown, Sanjana tears off her dress to escape the roaches, exposing herself at the party and to the paparazzi. The public believes this to be a publicity stunt, causing her career to tank. As Sanjana is hospitalized, Aditya, guilt-ridden, tells Sanjana the truth about him and Shanaya. He angrily breaks into Shanaya's house and steals the last vial of the poisonous water.

Shanaya seeks Tara Dutt's help again, wanting to kill Sanjana once and for all. Tara Dutt tells Shanaya that life and death are in God's hands, and to fight God, he'll need her life force. Shanaya has to have sex with him to enable Tara to become powerful enough, to which she agrees. At the hospital, with the help of the doctor and a priest, Aditya goes into the spirit world to free Sanjana's trapped spirit and bring her back.

A hard fight ensues, and Aditya defeats Tara Dutt, rescuing Sanjana's soul. Back in the real world, Shanaya suffers physical damage due to Tara Dutt getting destroyed and attempts to kill Aditya and Sanjana. Failing, she vows that she will forever remain a star and commits suicide by pouring acid on her head. Later, doctors tell the media that Sanjana suffered a nervous breakdown so her incident was not a publicity stunt. Sanjana's career is restored and she and Aditya happily get together.

== Cast ==
- Bipasha Basu as Shanaya Shekhar, the main antagonist
- Emraan Hashmi as Aditya Arora, the main protagonist
- Esha Gupta as Sanjana Krishna
- Manish Chaudhari as Tara Dutt / (Evil Ghost)
- Mohan Kapoor as Doctor

== Production ==
=== Filming ===
The film began shooting on 29 January 2012, director Vikram Bhatt explained how confident he is that the film should be completed sometime in Summer 2012 and that Raaz 3 is amongst his most important films.

== Promotion ==
=== Trailer launch ===
The Raaz 3 trailer was originally scheduled to be attached with the prints of Rohit Shetty's Bol Bachchan on 6 July 2012. However, it was delayed multiple times due to censoring. The theatrical trailer was officially launched on 30 July 2012 for the media, as confirmed by actress Bipasha Basu. Despite being widely speculated that it would be released to the public also, this was proven false. Later, the theatrical trailer was unveiled for the public as it was released online a day later on 31 July 2012. The theatrical trailer will also be in theatres on 3 August 2012 with Pooja Bhatt's Jism 2, as they are both under the Vishesh Films banner.

=== Marketing ===
Raaz 3 was promoted on the Sony TV show C.I.D. Bipasha Basu and Esha Gupta promoted the film by making an appearance on a special episode of CID, which aired on 2 September 2012.

Although, the film was originally planned to be released on 31 August 2012 alongside Barfi! and Joker, it was later delayed to avoid clashing with any other big film. Raaz 3 was banned for release in UAE, although is being kept under review for the adult content included in the film.

== Soundtrack ==
Raaz 3

Soundtrack album by Jeet Ganguly & Rashid Khan
- Released: 4 August 2012
- Recorded: 2011–2012
- Genres: Feature film soundtrack, Indian conventional music, soft rock, sufi music, Gujarati folk, punjabi folk, qawwali
- Length: 27:03
- Language: Hindi
- Label: T-Series
- Producers: Jeet Ganguly, Rashid Khan

Jeet Gannguli chronology
Shirin Farhad Ki Toh Nikal Padi (2012)	Raaz 3 (2012)	Aashiqui 2 (2013)

The film's music was composed by Jeet Gannguli and Rashid Khan, while the lyrics were penned by Devendra Singh, Sanjay Masoomm and Kumaar.

No.	Title	Lyrics	Music	Singer(s)	Length
1.	"Deewana Kar Raha Hai"	Devendra Singh	Rashid Khan	Javed Ali	5:38
2.	"Zindagi Se"	Sanjay Masoomm	Jeet Gannguli	Shafqat Amanat Ali Khan	4:50
3.	"Rafta Rafta"	Sanjay Masoomm	Jeet Gannguli	KK	4:32
4.	"Oh My Love"	Sanjay Masoomm	Jeet Gannguli	Sonu Nigam, Shreya Ghoshal	4:57
5.	"Kya Raaz Hai"	Kumaar	Jeet Gannguli	Shreya Ghoshal, Zubeen Garg	3:48
6.	"Khayalon Mein"	Kumaar	Jeet Gannguli	Shreya Ghoshal	4:18
Total length:					27:03

== Release ==
Raaz 3 released in India and overseas on 7 September 2012. The film was released in stereoscopic 3D, Imax 3D and 3D worldwide. Raaz 3 is the biggest release for an Emraan Hashmi film as it released on over 2000 screens in India, including in its 3D format. The film received an Adult Certificate from the Censor Board of India without any cuts.

=== Critical reception ===
The movie received mixed reviews from critics. Critics pointed out that the only saving grace of the movie was Bipasha. Taran Adarsh gave it 3.5/5 stars, commenting "If you are an enthusiast of supernatural thrillers/horror movies, RAAZ 3 should be on your list of 'things to do and watch' this weekend. Go, get ready to be spooked!" Bollywood3 awarded it 3.25/5 stars and wrote," On the whole, Raaz 3 is one movie which has everything going its way. Gritty screenplay, awesome songs and mature performances are sure shot plus points. On the other hand it would be interesting to see how family audience, who love watching popcorn entertainment respond to this film. To those who love edge of the seat horror thrillers, Raaz 3 is one film which is highly recommended. Go buy yourself a ticket and experience the thrill in 3D." Madhureeta Mukherjee of The Times of India gave it 3/5 stars while writing, "For all those who want to move over from the Ramsay Bros... go watch 'Raaz 3' in 3D, at your own risk. But don't take it to your grave." Ananya Bhattacharya of Zee News gave it 3/5 stars and stated that"Watch 'Raaz 3' for Bipasha and its 3D factor."Independent Bollywood gave 3 out of 5 stars and quoted "Some real original scares and chills this time with memorable performances." IBNLive also gave it 3/5 stars calling it a good horror film.

Subhash K. Jha of IANS gave 2 out of 5 stars saying, "It's Bipasha who holds together the feverish proceedings. She delivers a full-bodied gutsy performance." Udita Jhunjhunwala of businessofcinema.com said, "Bhatt gets the rhythm of the suspense-building wrong, going all too rapidly from grotesque decapitation to a kiss and song scene. It does not help that the acting is also at different levels. Most of the burden to convince rests on Basu's fit shoulders – and she does. You do believe that she is menacing and wicked."

== Box office ==
=== India ===
Raaz 3 took a good opening of around 50% at multiplexes and 65–70% in single screens on average. The opening at single screens later picked up to an excellent occupancy of 70%–100% over the noon and matinees shows. Raaz 3 went on to collecting approx. ₹105.0 million (US$1.1 million) on its opening day, thus becoming the sixteenth film ever to cross the ₹100 million (US$1.1 million) mark on the opening day itself. The film then went on to collecting approx. ₹112.5 million (US$1.2 million) on its second day. The film then collected approx. ₹140 million (US$1.5 million) on its third day, taking its opening weekend total to ₹357.5 million (US$3.8 million), thus making it the sixth biggest weekend grosser of 2012 for a Bollywood release. Raaz 3 had a huge first week where it had collected ₹516.9 million (US$5.5 million). Raaz 3 collected ₹182.5 million (US$1.9 million) nett in its second weekend taking its ten-day collection to ₹600 million (US$6.4 million) nett. It had collected ₹134.8 million (US$1.4 million) in its second week and ₹20.4 million (US$220,000) in its third week to make a total of ₹672.1 million (US$7.2 million) domestically. The film ultimately grossed ₹674.1 million (US$7.2 million) domestically and ₹953 million (US$10 million) worldwide. Box Office India declared the film as a "Super Hit".

=== Overseas ===
Raaz 3 did not do as well overseas, as it approximately collected around US$1 million (₹ 55 million) plus in ten days. The film was not released in the UAE, which has been noted to have hit it hard, as it could have been the film's best International market and added another $250,000 plus in revenue. Raaz 3 was declared average by box office India.

== Awards and nominations ==
Award	Category	Recipients and nominees	Result	Ref.
Dainik Bhasker Bollywood Digital Awards	Antisocial Character of the Year	Bipasha Basu	Won	
Cosmopolitan Fun Fearless Awards	Best Performance by an Actor in a Negative Role	Bipasha Basu	Won	
Dainik Bhasker Bollywood Digital Awards	SuperStar of the Year (Female)	Bipasha Basu	Nominated	
Stardust Awards	Best Actress in a Thriller or Action	Bipasha Basu	Nominated	
Star Screen Awards	Best Villain	Bipasha Basu	Nominated	
Star Screen Awards	Best Actress (Popular Choice)	Bipasha Basu	Nominated	
Zee Cine Award	Best Villain	Bipasha Basu	Nominated	
International Indian Film Academy Awards	Best Performance in a Negative Role	Bipasha Basu	Nominated	
Star Guild Awards	Best Actor in Negative Role	Bipasha Basu	Nominated	
Big Star entertainment Award	Most Entertaining Actress in a Thriller Film	Bipasha Basu	Nominated	
Big Star entertainment Award	Most entertaining Film Actor - Female	Bipasha Basu	Nominated	
Times of India Film Award	Best Performance by an Actor in a Negative Role	Bipasha Basu	Nominated	
5th Mirchi Music Awards	Background Score of the Year	Raju Singh	Nominated	

== Sequel ==
A fourth film in the series, titled Raaz Reboot released on 16 September 2016.
