= Mukesh Bhatt =

Film producer

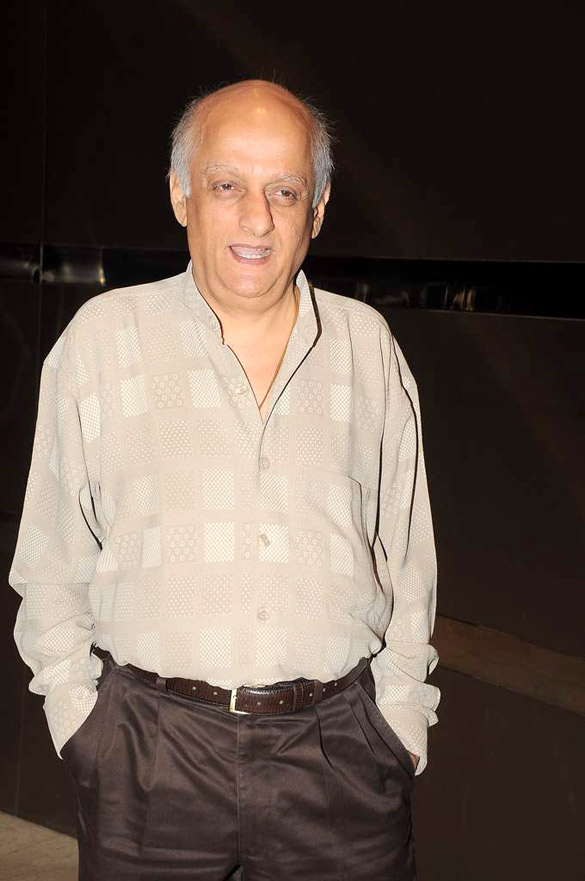
- Bhatt at the launch of T. P. Aggarwal's trade magazine "Blockbuster" in 2018
- Born: 5 June 1952 (age 74); Bombay, Bombay State, India (present-day Mumbai, Maharashtra)
- Occupations: Film producer; actor
- Organization: Vishesh Films
- Spouse: Neelima Bhatt
- Children: 3 (including Vishesh Bhatt)
- Parents: Nanabhai Bhatt (father); Shirin Mohammad Ali (mother)
- Family: See Bhatt family

Mukesh Bhatt (born 5 June 1952) is an Indian film producer and actor who has produced several Bollywood films. He is the younger brother of Mahesh Bhatt, and also the co-owner of the production company Vishesh Films, set up in 1986.

== Personal life ==
Bhatt is the son of Nanabhai Bhatt (1915–1999), a Hindi film director and producer. His father was a Gujarati Brahmin and mother a Gujarati Muslim. Nanabhai's brother, Balwant Bhatt (1909–1965) was also a Hindi film director. He is married to Nilima Bhatt. Bhatt has one daughter named Sakshi and a son Vishesh; Vishesh Films was named after him. For 30 years Mukesh along with his brother Mahesh produced movies under the banner of Vishesh Films. However owing to differences between the brothers, Mukesh Bhatt took over Vishesh Films and in May 2021, it was publicly announced that Mahesh Bhatt was no more associated with the firm.

== Career ==
Bhatt's first film as producer was the successful film Jurm (1990), starring Vinod Khanna. He later collaborated with Gulshan Kumar to produce the love story Aashiqui (1990), starring debutantes Rahul Roy and Anu Aggarwal, which was directed by his brother Mahesh. The films following Aashiqui, including Dil Hai Ki Manta Nahin (1991) and Sadak (1991) starring Pooja Bhatt, Aamir Khan and Sanjay Dutt, were all big hits; the films were released under the banner of his production company Vishesh Films.

Bhatt produced more films in the following years, such as, Sir (1993) starring Naseeruddin Shah, Naajayaz (1995), Criminal (1995), and Fareb (1996). The 1998 film Ghulam, was yet another success for the producer. In 1999, Sangharsh starring Preity Zinta and Akshay Kumar was a successful venture for the producer, while the horror films Raaz (2002), and its sequels Raaz – The Mystery Continues (2009), Raaz 3 (2012), and Raaz Reboot (2016) were received positively. In 2004, he introduced his nephew Emraan Hashmi on the big screen with the film Footpath, also starring Bipasha Basu. His recent ventures as producer include, Zeher (2005), Kalyug (2005), Gangster (2006), Woh Lamhe (2006), Jannat (2008), Tum Mile (2009), Murder (2004), and Aashiqui (1990).

He, along with his brother Mahesh, produced Mr. X (2015) and Hamari Adhuri Kahani (2015) with Emraan Hashmi and Vidya Balan in leading roles. It is based on the love story of Bhatt's parents Nanabhai Bhatt and Shirin Mohammad Ali, along with his stepmother.

== Filmography ==
- Awarapan (2007) as producer
- Murder 2 (2011) as producer
- Love Games (2016)
- Sadak 2 (2020)

== Awards ==
- 1992: Nominated, Filmfare Award for Best Movie – Dil Hai Ki Manta Nahin
- 1999: Nominated, Filmfare Award for Best Movie – Ghulam
- 2003: Nominated, Filmfare Award for Best Movie – Raaz
- 2005: Nominated, Zee Cine Awards – Popular Award for Best Producer of the Year – Murder
- 2015: Global Film Award- 8th Global Film Festival Noida-Asian Academy of Film & Television
