= Vikram Bhatt =

Indian film director

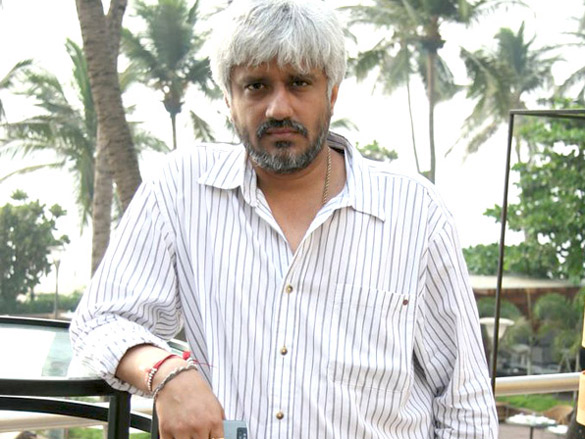
- Occupations: Director; actor; screenwriter; producer
- Years active: 1982–present
- Spouses: Aditi Bhatt (div. 1998) Shwetambhari Soni (m. 2020)
- Children: 3
- Father: Pravin Bhatt
- Relatives: Vijay Bhatt (grandfather); Arun Bhatt (uncle); Chirantan Bhatt (first cousin)
- Family: Bhatt family (of Vijay Bhatt)

Vikram Bhatt is an Indian director, producer, screenwriter and actor. He is best known for directing the Raaz film series, an Indian horror series produced by Mahesh Bhatt and Mukesh Bhatt and for directing Ghulam (1998) starring Aamir Khan and Rani Mukherji, which was also produced by Mukesh Bhatt. For both of these films, he was nominated for the Filmfare Award for Best Director.

Formerly, he was the creative head of ASA Productions and Enterprises until 2014, when he resigned from the company. Many of his films were produced under Loneranger Productions, which he co-founded.

== Early life ==
Bhatt is the grandson of Vijay Bhatt from (Gujarat, Palitana), one of the pioneers of the Indian film industry, and the son of cinematographer Pravin Bhatt.

== Career ==
At the age of 14, in 1982, Bhatt started his career with director Mukul Anand in Anand's first film, Kanoon Kya Karega.

In 2008, Bhatt came back with the horror genre and he delivered three films that were successful at the box office; these include 1920. Shaapit and Haunted – 3D. In 2010, Bhatt introduced stereoscopic 3D for the first time in India with his film Haunted – 3D; the film was released in May 2011 and it then set the record of the highest grossing Hindi horror film of all time, making Rs. 270 million at the box office.

In 2012, Bhatt's Raaz 3: The Third Dimension recorded domestic box office collection of Rs. 729 million after the 3rd weekend and the overseas collection was at 46 million. Riding high with the success, Bhatt is writing another horror-thriller for Bipasha in the central role, with a more shocking image than Raaz 3. Following the success of Raaz 3, Vikram Bhatt's written Hindi horror film 1920: Evil Returns which has been directed by debutant Bhushan Patel topped the first weekend collection chart at the box office and the approximate collection was Rs 124.3 million nett. The movie further collected approx Rs 37.5 million nett in the second Weekend, taking the total to Rs 228.6 million nett. The film has been declared a 'hit'. Soon after, Bhatt signed a deal with Bhushan Kumar's T-Series to produce 5 films of sci-fi, thriller and horror genre. Two of the films will be directed by Bhatt himself.

In early 2013, Bhatt announced his upcoming projects, Creature 3D, India's First 3D Monster Movie with Bipasha Basu in the lead role and 1920 London, third in the 1920 series.

Starting from 16 February 2014, he would be seen hosting the TV Show Ishq Kills based on Real Life Romances on Star Plus.

== Personal life ==
Bhatt was married to his childhood sweetheart, Aditi Bhatt (div. 1998), and they have a daughter, Krishna Bhatt. Bhatt shares a great bond with his daughter and she has been assisting him on his sets.

Bhatt reportedly dated Ameesha Patel for five years and had also reportedly dated Sushmita Sen sometime in the mid-1990s, after she became Miss Universe 1994. He married art connoisseur Shwetambari Soni in 2020.

== Filmography ==
=== Director ===
Year	Film	Note
1993	Jaanam	
1994	Madhosh	
1995	Gunehgar	
1996	Fareb	Based on Unlawful Entry
1996	Bambai Ka Babu	
1998	Ghulam	Based on On the Waterfront and Kabzaa; Nominated—Filmfare Award for Best Director
2001	Kasoor	Based on Jagged Edge; Dubbed for Aftab Shivdasani
2002	Raaz	Based on What Lies Beneath; Nominated—Filmfare Award for Best Director; Partially dubbed for Dino Morea
2002	Aap Mujhe Achche Lagne Lage	
2002	Awara Paagal Deewana	Based on The Whole Nine Yards; director only
2003	Inteha	Based on Fear; Dubbed for Ashmit Patel
2003	Footpath	Based on State of Grace (1990); Dubbed for Emraan Hashmi
2004	Aetbaar	Based on Fear
2005	Elaan	
2005	Jurm	Based on Double Jeopardy; Dubbed for Milind Soman
2005	Deewane Huye Paagal	Based on There's Something About Mary
2006	Ankahee	Dubbed for Aftab Shivdasani
2007	Red: The Dark Side	
2007	Fear	
2007	Speed	Based on Cellular
2007	Life Mein Kabhie Kabhiee	
2008	1920	Inspired by The Exorcist Dubbed for Indraneil Sengupta
2010	Shaapit	
2011	Haunted – 3D	Dubbed for Mahaakshay Chakraborty
2012	Dangerous Ishhq	
2012	Raaz 3D	
2014	Creature 3D	
2015	Mr. X	Remake of Mr. X in Bombay (1964) and Mr. India (1987)
2016	Love Games	
2016	Raaz Reboot	
2018	1921	
2019	Ghost	
2020	Hacked	
2022	Judaa Hoke Bhi	
2025	Tumko Meri Kasam	
2026	Haunted 3D: Echoes of the Past	Co-directed with Manish P. Chavan

=== Writer ===
- Dastak (1996)
- Aetbaar (2004)
- Bardaasht (2004)
- Yakeen (2005)
- Ankahee (2006)
- Three- Love, Lies and Betrayal (2009)
- Hate Story (2012)
- 1920: Evil Returns (2012)
- Horror Story (film) (2013)
- Ankur Arora Murder Case (2013)
- Khamoshiyan (2015)
- 1920 London (2016)
- Ghost (2019)
- Dangerous (2020)
- Tumko Meri Kasam (2025)
- Haunted 3D: Echoes of the Past (2026)

=== Producer ===
- Muthirai (2009)
- 1920 (2008)
- Three- Love, Lies and Betrayal (2009)
- Lanka (2011)
- Hate Story (2012)
- 1920: Evil Returns (2012)
- Dangerous Ishq (2012)
- Horror Story (2013)
- Hate Story 2 (2014)
- Bhaag Johnny (2014)
- Hate Story 3 (2015)
- Dangerous (2020)
- 1920 Horrors of the Heart (2023)

=== Actor ===
Year	Film	Role
2015	Bhaag Johnny	Jinn
2015	Khamoshiyan	Book Editor
2018	1921	Mr. Wadia
2019	Khamoshi	Dev's Father
2019	Ghost	Doctor Singh

== Awards and nominations ==
Year	Award	Category	Film	Result
1999	Filmfare Awards	Best Director	Ghulam	Nominated
2003	Filmfare Awards	Best Director	Raaz	Nominated
