= Malini Sharma =

Indian former model, actress, and farmstay founder

- M. Sharma in 2002
- Born: Delhi, India
- Occupations: Actress; model; art director; entrepreneur
- Years active: 1996–2008
- Known for: Raaz
- Spouse: Priyanshu Chatterjee (m. 1997; div. 2001)

Malini Sharma is an Indian former model, actress, and art director, best known for her role as Malini Malik in the 2002 supernatural horror film Raaz. After a prominent career in the late 1990s as an indie-pop music video icon and television actress, she transitioned to off-camera work before leaving the entertainment industry entirely to focus on raising her family. She subsequently transitioned into sustainable entrepreneurship and founded "The Slow Local", an organic farmstay and slow-living project located in the Sahyadri Hills near Pune.

== Career ==
=== Early work and music videos ===
Sharma began her career as a commercial model in Mumbai and made her television acting debut in 1996 in the serial Hum Dono, playing the dual roles of Piyasha Narang and Amita. In the late 1990s, she achieved widespread public recognition as a prominent face in India's booming non-film music video industry, starring in highly rotated music videos including Bombay Vikings' "Kya Soorat Hai", Mika Singh's "Sawan Mein Lag Gayi Aag", "Kitni Akeli", and "Ranjhar".

In 2000, she moved into television acting, starring as Tanya in the Sony Entertainment Television action series C.A.T.S., an Indian adaptation of Charlie's Angels. The series co-starred models Nafisa Joseph and Kuljeet Randhawa.

=== Film debut and off-camera transition ===
Sharma made her feature film debut in Vikram Bhatt's supernatural horror film Raaz (2002), playing the key antagonist spirit, Malini Malik, alongside Bipasha Basu and Dino Morea. The film was a major commercial success, becoming the second-highest-grossing Hindi film of 2002. Her appearance in the hit song "Aapke Pyaar Mein" earned her immense popularity; she received the Zee Cine Award for Best Female Debut in 2003 and earned a nomination for the Filmfare Award for Best Female Debut.

Following the success of Raaz, Sharma was reported to have signed for the thriller Encounter (later released as Gunaah) opposite Dino Morea, but withdrew from the project 48 hours before filming began, citing a lack of long-term ambition for mainstream acting. She subsequently pivoted to behind-the-camera production work, serving as an art director on two Hindi feature films: Just Married (2007) and Thoda Pyaar Thoda Magic (2008), before completely stepping away from the film industry to raise her children.

== Later life and The Slow Local ==
After exiting Bollywood, Sharma initially launched "The Slow Local" as a community-oriented artisanal collective in Mumbai's Versova neighborhood, hosting children's storytelling workshops and retailing homemade goods, including artisanal bread, granola, and handmade crafts.

Around the COVID-19 pandemic, Sharma permanently relocated to a remote farm property in the Sahyadri Hills. The venture evolved into an eco-conscious farmstay, where she practices organic agriculture—cultivating fruits, vegetables, and medicinal plants—and manages hospitality services for visitors. In August 2026, Sharma released a series of self-shot video diaries titled "The Slow Local Diaries" on her social media platforms, marking her first sustained public appearance on camera in over two decades. The video logs went viral across national entertainment media, renewing public interest in her career and lifestyle transition.

== Personal life ==
Sharma married model and actor Priyanshu Chatterjee in 1997. The couple divorced in 2001, prior to their respective breakout cinematic releases. Sharma subsequently remarried in 2006 outside the entertainment industry to a Pathan family and has children.

== Filmography ==
=== Film ===
Year	Title	Role / Credit	Notes
2002	Raaz	Malini Malik	Winner—Zee Cine Award for Best Female Debut; Nominated—Filmfare Award for Best Female Debut
2007	Just Married	Art director	Production role
2008	Thoda Pyaar Thoda Magic	Art director	Production role

=== Television ===
- Hum Dono (1996) as Piyasha Narang / Amita (Dual role)
- C.A.T.S. (2000–2001) as Tanya
