= Sukriti Kakar =

Indian singer (born 1995)

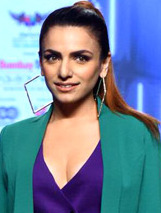
- Kakar in 2022

Background information
- Born: 8 May 1995 (age 31); Delhi, India
- Genres: Bollywood, pop, rock, Hindustani classical
- Occupation: Singer
- Years active: 2011–present
- Labels: Zee Music * T-Series * Saregama Music

Sukriti Kakar (born 8 May 1995) is an Indian singer born in New Delhi. Kakar rose to prominence after recording title song from the film Boss composed by Meet Bros which featured Yo Yo Honey Singh. Since then she has sung many songs most notably, "Kar Gayi Chull" from Kapoor & Sons which became a huge hit.

== Life and career ==
=== 1995–2011: Early life ===
Kakar studied arts at Mithibai College and was a B.M.M student at R.D. National College. Since the very beginning, Kakar has grown up in a musical environment. Her mom has trained in Hindustani classical music for a very long time and was a music teacher at Balbharti Public School in Delhi for a long time. Her elder sister Akriti Kakar is also a playback singer and her twin sister Prakriti Kakar, who is also a playback singer, realised her love for music at the age of 8 and started her career with "Katra Katra" in Alone (2015).

=== 2012 – 2020: Bollywood releases ===
Kakar began her career with the title song of Boss (2013), which was composed by Meet Bros Anjjan. Her next song was from the movie Hum Hai Raahi Car Ke (2013) title track. She next appeared in the track "Goti Song" from the movie Nasha (2013) with Akshay Deodhar and her twin sister Prakriti Kakar. Kakar's performance in Mujhse Hogi Shurvaat was released by "I Paid a Bribe" and The Shankar Mahadevan Academy as an initiative to tackle corruption. Apart from Kakar, the song is rendered by Mahadevan, Prakriti Kakar and Chetan Naik. The song was nominated in the best activist anthem category of Honesty Oscars 2014.

In June 2015, she bagged her first hit, "Pheli Baar" from the movie Dil Dhadakne Do, which was a massive hit which crossed over 4 million views on YouTube. It was then she was offered to sing for the song "Jungli Peeke Tight Hai" from Kis Kisko Pyaar Karoon (2015) starred Kapil Sharma. A year later in 2016, she lent her voice for Kapoor & Sons for the song "Kar Gayi Chull" along with Badshah & Neha Kakkar.In 2017, she sang "Maine Tujhko Dekha" from Golmaal Again composed by Amaal Malik which itself was a remake from the 1997 film Ishq, composed by Anu Malik.

=== 2021 – Present: Pop music ===
Beside filmy songs, Kakar has sung some non-filmy songs. She along with her sister, Prakriti Kakar has sung "Mafiyan", "Kehndi Haan Kehndi Naa", "Majnu" and many more.

In September 2021, the duo sisters along with Amaal Mallik collaborated with Dua Lipa for Indian remix version of Levitating (song), which became a global hit.

== Media ==
In March 2021, Sukriti along with her sister Prakriti Kakar featured at No. 2 position on the global Billboard charts for their song "Naari". Later that year in October, Kakar along with Prakriti Kakar featured at the Times Square in New York City.

== Discography ==
=== Film songs ===
Year	Film	Song	Composer(s)	Writer(s)	Co-singer(s)	Ref.
2013	Boss	"Boss (Title Track)"	Meet Bros Anjjan	Kumaar	Rap: Yo Yo Honey Singh	1
2013	Hum Hai Raahi Car Ke	"Hum Hai Raahi Car Ke (Title Track)"	Sangeet-Siddharth	Sangeet-Siddharth	Chorus	2
2013	Nasha	"Goti Song"	Sangeet-Siddharth	Radhika Anand	Prakriti Kakar, Akshay Deodhar	3
2015	Dil Dhadakne Do	"Pehli Baar"	Shankar–Ehsaan–Loy	Javed Akhtar	Siddharth Mahadevan	4
2015	Kis Kisko Pyaar Karoon	"Jugni Peeke Tight Hai (v2.0)"	Amjad-Nadeem	Shabbir Ahmed	Divya Kumar	5
2016	Kapoor & Sons	"Kar Gayi Chull"	Badshah, Amaal Mallik	Badshah, Kumaar	Badshah, Fazilpuria, Neha Kakkar	6
2016	A Scandal	"Labon Se"	Amjad-Nadeem	Sameer Anjaan	Jubin Nautiyal	
2016	Rustom	"Rustom Wahi"	Raghav Sachar	Kumaar	-	
2017	Golmaal Again	"Maine Tujhko Dekha"	Amaal Mallik	Kumaar	Neeraj Shridhar	15
2017	Noor	"Jise Kehte Pyar Hai"	Amaal Mallik	Kumaar	-	15
2018	Sonu Ke Titu Ki Sweety	"Lakk Mera Hit"	Rochak Kohli	Kumaar	Mannat Noor, Rochak Kohli	
2018	Hate Story 4	"Badnamiyaan (Female Version)"	Luvdeep Singh saini	Rashmi Virag	-	
2018	Nawabzaade	"Amma Dekh"	Gurinder Seagal	Gurinder Seagal, Boman	Gurinder Seagal, Ikka	
2019	Amavas	"Finito"	Abhijit Vaghani	Kunaal Verma, Ikka	Jubin Nautiyal, Ikka	
2019	Drive	"Karma"	Amartya Bobo Rahut	Siddhant Kaushal	-	
2021	Squad	"Main Toh Tere Nashe Mein"	Amjad Nadeem Aamir	Amjad Nadeem	-	
2023	Pathaan	"Jhoome Jo Pathaan"	Vishal–Shekhar	Kumaar	Arijit Singh, Vishal–Shekhar	

=== Non-film songs ===
Year	Title	Co-singer(s)	Ref.
2018	Sudhar Ja	Prakriti Kakar	
2019	Mafiyaan	Prakriti Kakar	
2020	Kehndi Haan Kehndi Naa	Prakriti Kakar	
2020	Out Of Control	Sahil Arya	
2020	Mashallah	Prakriti Kakar, THEMXXNLIGHT	
2020	Hum Tum	Prakriti Kakar	
2021	Sona Lagda	Prakriti Kakar, Sukhe	
2021	Levitating (Indian Remix)	Dua Lipa, Prakriti Kakar	
2021	Majnu	Prakriti Kakar, Mellow D	
2021	Is It Love	Ash King	
2022	Single Saiyaan	Prakriti Kakar	
2022	Dobara	Prakriti Kakar	
2022	Kya Say?	Prakriti Kakar, Badshah	
2023	Over You	Prakriti Kakar	

== Awards and achievements ==
- Nomination for 'Upcoming Female Vocalist' for her song,"Pehli Baar" (Dil Dhadakne Do) at Mirchi Music Awards in 2015.
- Sukriti has been featured on a devotional Album Ganaraj Adhiraj in 2014 and sang two tracks on it. The album bagged a GiMA in 2012.
- Featured on the MTV Unplugged with Mika Singh.
- Featured on the T-Series MixTape with Shaan.
