= Mohammed Aslam Shaikh =

Indian film producer

Mohammed Aslam Shaikh is a Bollywood producer and proprietor of Umbrella Film Corporation, producing the upcoming film Hotel Beautifool. The film stars Rejith Menon, Johny Lever, Brijendra Kala, Jia Sharma, Shaanti, Sagarika Chhetri, Vishavpreet Kaur, Alisha Farrer, Imam Siddique, and Sandeep Ghosh.

== Development of Hotel Beautifool ==
Hotel Beautifool is based on the popular Hindi play Baat Baat mein Bigdey haalaat, written and directed by Sameer Iqbal Patel. Patel was planning to make it into a film for some time when Mohammed Aslam Shaikh and Madhire Ravinder Reddy saw the play and decided to join with Patel in making it into a Hindi feature film.

The first schedule of the film started at Mumbai's future studio on 20 July 2014 and was completed on 29 July. The second schedule began on 27 September 2014 in Morjim, Goa.
