= Dishayen =

- Dishayen
- Genre: Soap opera
- Created by: Ila Bedi Dutta; Minakshi Gupta
- Developed by: Hasmukh Shah; Narendra Kessar
- Opening theme: "Dishayen" by Priya Bhattacharya
- Composers: Anand Raj Anand; Dev Kohli
- Country of origin: India
- Original language: Hindi
- No. of seasons: 2
- No. of episodes: 261

Production
- Executive producers: Hasmukh Shah; Narendra Kessar
- Running time: 30 minutes

Original release
- Network: DD National
- Release: 8 October 2001 – 18 January 2005

Dishayen is an Indian television series produced by Time Magnetics and broadcast on DD National. The series premiered on 8 October 2001 and ended on 18 January 2005.

== Episodes ==
Season	Episodes	First aired	Last aired
1	1-100	8 October 2001	17 September 2002
2	101-261	7 July 2003	18 January 2005

== Cast ==
- Purbi Joshi / Pooja Ghai as identical twins Neha & Nikita
- Karan Oberoi (singer) as Rajeev Gupta
- Sudhanshu Pandey as Sameer Gupta/Baba/Jagmohan Sharma
- Reena Kapoor as Sonia
- Shagufta Ali as Vidya, Sonia's mother
- Narendra Jha as Veer Pratap Singh
- Rajeev Verma as Rajat Sharma
- Smita Hai as Savitri Rajat Sharma
- Vineeta Malik as Gayatri
- Jaya Mathur as Shalini
- Dharmesh Vyas as Deepak
- Lata Sabharwal as Reema

== Plot ==
Neha and Nikita are twins. Nikita dreams about Bollywood stardom while Neha is the simpler one. Their father wants Nikita to marry Rajeev. In desperation, Nikita tells her twin that she will commit suicide unless Neha pretends to be her and marry Rajeev. After all, Nikita reasons, it is Neha who always wanted the quiet family life. On their wedding night, Neha admits to Rajeev that she is not Nikita. Rajeev knew about the substitution; he agreed because he wanted a wife like Neha. The sisters’ aunt learns about the switch and tells the bridegroom's mother Mrs. Gayatri. The angry mother-in-law makes Neha leave her house, but Neha slowly wins over her in-laws, except for her brother-in-law Sameer, the black sheep of the family.

A film producer gets Nikita drunk and takes semi-nude photos of her so that he can blackmail her. Nikita tells Neha about this, and they decide to do something, but instead suffer an accident. Nikita survives, but Neha goes missing. Neha's in-laws think Nikita has died, and Nikita realises that a way out of her problems is to impersonate Neha. Her plan works and she becomes well-adjusted to Neha's new family, except Sameer and the twins' cousin cause trouble for her, believing that she is Neha. Nikita slowly transforms into the dutiful wife Neha was and develops feelings for Rajeev. It is revealed that Neha survived the accident. As her memories return, she heads back to her marital home. She is kept unaware of the truth by Rajeev and Nikita.

Ex-convict Vishal is the love child of the twins' father, Sharma, and another woman. Vishal shows up one day to make his father pay for his sins. The twins' mother spurns Sharma, but the twins become accepting of their half-brother. Neha is distraught when she learns that Nikita is carrying Rajeev's baby, because Neha too is pregnant with Rajeev's child. Neha confronts Rajeev and asks him to divorce Nikita.

Meanwhile, Vishal becomes enemies with Sameer. The hostility escalates, until Sameer learns about the twins' pregnancies. He is upset, as he realises that he has a soft spot for Nikita. In a freak accident, Nikita loses her child. She sees that divorce from Rajeev is imminent, which makes her doubly sad. Strangely, her abortion brings her parents together and they accept Vishal as their son. Sameer, whose ego is bruised beyond repair, mends fences with Vishal and turns himself in to the police for his crimes. Neha, meanwhile, learns that Rajeev never served divorce papers to Nikita. She thinks that Rajeev's fidelity is wavering. Rajeev becomes upset because he is equally answerable to both the sisters. When Rajeev fails to serve Nikita the divorce papers, Neha gets angry and threatens to divorce him. Sameer sides with Neha and they both leave the house, but both suffer a brutal accident. The families go to see them. Sameer dies after apologising for his misdeeds. When Nikita and Rajeev go to see Neha, she has delivered twins. She hands the twins to Rajeev and Nikita, then dies.
