= Alisha Farrer =

Australian actress and model

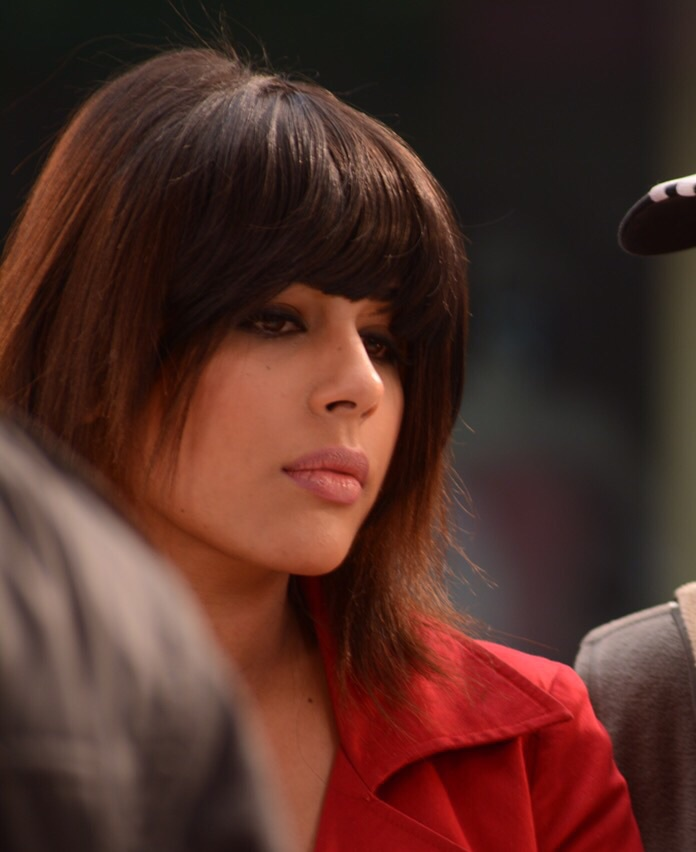
- Alisha Farrer on shoot location of Zindagi
- Born: 19 October 1993 (age 32); Perth, Western Australia, Australia
- Occupations: Actress, model
- Years active: 2014–present

Alisha Farrer (born 19 October 1993) is an Australian actress and model who works primarily in Indian cinema and television. While in college, Farrer did a few modelling jobs. Following appearances in several television commercials, she entered the Miss India Australia pageant. She is a state finalist for Miss World Western Australia 2013. She has mainly appeared in Hindi films. Her first role in film came with the 2016 box office disaster romantic drama Love Games. She subsequently received praise for her appearance in the reality show Splitsvilla where she placed Semi-finalist. Farrer garnered critical appreciation for portraying the character Lubna in the Bollywood comedy film Hotel Beautifool (2017) Directed by Sameer Iqbal Patel.

== Early life ==
Alisha Farrer was born on 19 October 1993 in Perth, Western Australia to parents of Indian heritage. From the age of 4 she had shown interest in acting and dancing and was a fan of Bollywood films. Farrer was brought up in Beechboro, Western Australia and completed her higher education at Hampton Senior High School. After graduating in 2010, Farrer's parents encouraged her to take up modelling.

She worked briefly as a makeup artist alongside her modelling and launched her business Farrer Beauty, in Perth.

After she signed with Perth's Top Agency, Scene Model Management, her modelling career started to pick up as she was offered to model for clothing brands and television commercials for well known brands and runway shows. She walked the ramp for many events and designers such as Rocky Bay, Model of the Future, Fashion HEIR, Manish Malhotra. She was selected to represent Perth in Indian Australian Dancing Star, a finalist for Miss India Australia representing Perth, as well as a state finalist for Miss World Australia. Farrer garnered critical appreciation for portraying the character Lubna in the Bollywood Comedy Film Hotel Beautifool (2017), Directed by Sameer Iqbal Patel.

== Career ==
=== Modelling ===
March 2012, Farrer represented Australia in the Beauty Pageant Indian Princess International. She placed top 5, she also won Miss Best Smile. The pageant grooming and training was broadcast internationally on Channel V, including the grand finale. She was judged by Bollywood stars Hema Malini and Zeenat Aman.

After visiting Mumbai, she had been offered to pursue a career in acting however she felt that she was too young and inexperienced to be exposed to the industry and declined and continued to model in Australia.

In January 2013, Farrer briefly appeared in the short film "In the Hands of Todd". Shortly after in April, Farrer had a small role in the Australian film, Son of a gun, starring Ewan McGregor shot in Perth.

After that, Farrer had decided to take a years break from modelling to focus on her studies as she wanted to give more priority to her education and completing her teaching degree at Curtin University. With the support of her parents after a year Farrer then decided to take a step closer to her dream and moved to Mumbai in August 2014. By 2015, Farrer had completed advertisements in India for brands such as Renault with Bollywood celebrity Ranbir Kapoor, Lipton detox tea with Shraddha Kapoor, Adlabs Imagica and Sunsilk. She is signed with an agency in the UAE and regularly completes modelling projects in Dubai. Her commercial for 'This and That' chocolate regularly airs in the UAE and Pakistan.

=== Acting ===
Farrer's debut film, Love Games was a turning point in her career. She prizes her role as Sonia and often states the film as one of her best works. She has also appeared in many TV commercials for high end brands such as Sunsilk and Renault with brand ambassador Ranbir Kapoor

Farrer moved to Mumbai to establish her career August 2014 making her Bollywood debut with Sameer Iqbal Patel's comedy film, Hotel Beautifool. She had signed Hotel Beautifool within a week of moving to Mumbai and was the kick start of her career in Bollywood.

Immediately after completing the first schedule of Hotel Beautifool she was offered the role of Ritu in the Bollywood romantic comedy film Jhol under the Shasan Arts banner. After completion of Jhol, she then began shooting for her upcoming college based film Zindagi under the Rajshri Productions banner in Delhi. The film has completed its first two schedules and its currently in post production before the completion of the third.

Farrer regularly posts online beauty videos on the popular platform YouTube called "Beauty Mantra" in which she teaches makeup tips and tricks.

Shortly after she appeared in SuperCops vs Supervillains on the channel Life OK and also appeared in one of the hit shows on the channel Star Plus, Ye Hai Mohabbatein.

In August 2015, Farrer was signed with Vishesh Films as the character Sonia Kamat for the film Love Games, an erotic thriller directed by Vikram Bhatt, produced by Mukesh Bhatt & Mahesh Bhatt under the Vishesh Films banner. The film was shot completely in Cape Town South Africa. In 2016 Farrer then appeared in the Telugu film - కుమారి

In 2017, Farrer also appeared on MTV Splitsvilla X, the 10th Season.

In 2018, Farrer appeared in the film MOH, directed by Rajesh Rathi.

=== YouTube ===
Farrer also appears in regular YouTube videos for the beauty channel Beauty Mantra in which she teaches makeup artistry which led to her appearance on a popular beauty show telecasted on DD National.

== Filmography ==
| Year | Film | Role | Language | Notes |
|---|---|---|---|---|
| 2015 | Hotel Beautifool | Lubna | Hindi | |
| 2015 | Jhol | Ritu | Hindi | Post-production |
| 2015 | Zindagi | Nayla Bannerjee | Hindi | Post-production |
| 2016 | Love Games | Sonia Kamat | Hindi | |
| 2017 | కుమారి | Priya | Telugu | Cameo appearance |
| 2018 | Moh | Maya | Bollywood | Filming |
| 2018 | Jhol Jhal | Rosy | Marathi | TBA |

== Television ==
| Year | Title | Role | Notes |
|---|---|---|---|
| 2015 | SuperCops vs Supervillains | Mia | Television series |
| 2015 | Ye Hai Mohabbatein | Cameo Appearance | Episode 495 |
| 2015 | Ishqbaaaz | Hetal | Pilot Episode 112 |
| 2015 | Gumrah: End of Innocence | Abagail | Season 5, Episode 22 |
| 2016 | DD National | Herself | Daily Beauty Show |
| 2017 | MTV Splitsvilla X | Herself | Splitsvilla Season 10 |
