= Prakriti Kakar =

Indian singer (born 1995)

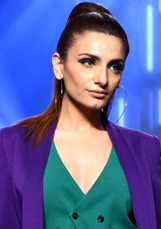
- Kakar in 2022

Background information
- Born: 8 May 1995 (age 31); New Delhi, India
- Genre: Film score
- Occupation: Singer
- Years active: 2012–present
- Spouse: Vinay Anand (m. 2026)

Prakriti Kakar (born 8 May 1995) is an Indian singer. Born in New Delhi, her career began upon singing the title song of 2012 Bollywood film Tutiya Dil. Subsequently, she provided backing vocals for films released in 2013. She then released songs in collaboration with Ankit Tiwari: "Katra Katra" from Alone and "Bheegh Loon" from Khamoshiyan. She, along with her twin sister Sukriti Kakar, released independent music videos including "Sudhar Ja", "Mafiyaan", "Kehndi Haa Kehndi Naa", "Hum Tum," "Sona Lagda", and "Majnu".

== Early life ==
Prakriti Kakar was born in New Delhi, India on May 8, 1995. Except for her father, everyone in the family sings, including her sister Akriti and twin sister Sukriti and she began learning music from her mother, who is a music teacher. Her inclination towards music led her mother to decide on training her professionally. Kakar trained in classical music for seven years and started playing keyboard and western music during the time. Since her elder sister, Akriti Kakar wanted to sing in Bollywood, she moved to Mumbai with her dad while Prakriti and the rest of her family accompanied them later. Talking about her childhood, Kakar stated; "When I came here, I was told that we are going to Mumbai for a holiday. I was in school back then. Imagine my surprise when I was enrolled in school here and realised we were here for good. This city was a culture shock for me."

== Career ==
=== 2012–2020: Bollywood releases ===
Kakar began her career with the titular song Tutiya Dil (2012), composed by Ram Sampath. She next appeared in the track "Goti Song" from Nasha (2013) together with Akshay Deodhar and her twin sister Sukriti Kakar. Kakar's following release was the title track of Boss, composed by Meet Bros. A version of "Mujhse Hogi Shurvaat" was released by "I Paid a Bribe" and the Shankar Mahadevan Academy as an initiative to tackle corruption. Apart from Kakar, the song is also performed by Mahadevan, Sukriti Kakar and Chetan Naik. The song was nominated in the best activist anthem category of Honesty Oscars 2014.

In June 2014, Ankit Tiwari heard Kakar singing in a fashion show and requested her to be a part of his shows as female vocalist. It was then she was offered to sing "Katra Katra" from Alone (2015). The recording took two hours. According to Tiwari, her voice had the "required element" for a song of the genre. Elaborating further Kakar stated; "I had to sound very innocent, like I am in love but at the same time, it was a song where I am seducing a guy so it had to be sensuous". Kakar next performed the female version of the song "Bheegh Loon" from the film Khamoshiyan, also composed by Tiwari. Kasmin Fernandes from The Times of India mentioned that she, "doesn't try to sound sensual yet manages to convey the mood required for a song in an erotic thriller."

=== 2021–present: Pop music ===
Kakar has also published music outside of the film score genre. She along with her sister, Sukriti Kakar has sung "Mafiyan," "Kehndi Haan Kehndi Naa," "Majnu" and many more.

In September 2021, the sister duo and Amaal Mallik collaborated with Dua Lipa for an Indian remix version of "Levitating," which became a global hit.

== Personal life ==
On 25 January, 2026, Kakar married entrepreneur Vinay Anand. They held the wedding ceremony at Fort Barwara, Jaipur.

== Media ==
In March 2021, Prakriti and her sister Sukriti Kakar rose to Number 2 in the global Billboard charts for their song "Naari." Later that year in October, they performed in Times Square in New York City.

== Influences ==
Kakar named both Western and Indian artists as her influences, including Whitney Houston, Beyoncé, Mariah Carey and Christina Aguilera, and Sunidhi Chauhan respectively. She also named Meet Bros and A. R. Rahman as her favorite composers.

== Discography ==
Key
†	Indicates single release

=== Film songs ===
Year	Film	Song	Composer(s)	Writer(s)	Co-singer(s)	Ref.
2012	Tutiya Dil	"Tutiya Dil"	Gulraj Singh	Manoj Yadav	Ram Sampath	
2013	Nasha	"Goti Song"	Sangeet Haldipur–Siddharth Haldipur	Radhika Anand	Akshay Deodhar, Sukriti Kakar	
2013	Boss	"Boss"	Meet Bros Anjjan	Kumaar	Meet Bros Anjjan, Yo Yo Honey Singh, Sukriti Kakar, Khushboo Grewal	
2015	Alone	"Katra Katra"	Ankit Tiwari	Abhendra Kumar Upadhyay	Ankit Tiwari	
2015	Khamoshiyan	"Bheegh Loon" (Female Version)	Ankit Tiwari	Abhendra Kumar Upadhyay	Ankit Tiwari	
2015	Khamoshiyan	"Bheegh Loon" (Female Version Remix)	Ankit Tiwari	Abhendra Kumar Upadhyay	Ankit Tiwari	
2015	Barkhaa	"Tu Itni Khoobsurat Hai" (Reloaded)	Amjad–Nadeem	Shadab Akhtar	Jubin Nautiyal	
2016	Azhar	"Tu Hi Na Jaane"	Amaal Mallik	Kumaar	Sonu Nigam	
2017	Paas Aao	"Paas Aao Na" Single	Amaal Mallik	Rashmi Virag	Armaan Malik	
2017	Noor	"Hai Zaroori"	Amaal Mallik	Kumaar		
2017	Guest iin London	"Dil Mera"	Raghav Sachar	Kumaar	Ash King, Shahid Mallya	
2017	Sweetiee Weds NRI	"O Saathi Rey"	Arko Pravo Mukherjee		Armaan Malik	
2017	Mubarakan	"Hawaa Hawaa"	Gourov–Roshin	Kumaar	Mika Singh	
2018	Dil Juunglee	"Gazab Ka Hai Din" Remake	Tanishk Bagchi	Tanishk Bagchi	Jubin Nautiyal	
2018	Dil Juunglee	"Beat Juunglee"	Tanishk Bagchi	Tanishk Bagchi, Vayu	Armaan Malik	
2018	Sonu Ke Titu Ki Sweety	"Subah Subah"	Amaal Mallik	Kumaar	Arijit Singh	
2018	Batti Gul Meter Chalu	"Hard Hard"	Sachet–Parampara	Siddharth–Garima	Mika Singh	
2018	Stree	"Dil Ka Darji"	Sachin–Jigar	Vayu		
2019	Yaana (Kannada film)	"Beelale Naa Beelale"		Shashank		
2020	Khaali Peeli	"Tehas Nehas"	Vishal–Shekhar	Kumaar	Shekhar Ravjiani	
2022	Maja Ma	"Ae Pagli"	Gourov Dasgupta	Kumaar	Ash King	
2023	Ganapath	"Hum Aaye Hain"	White Noise Studios	Priya Saraiya	Siddharth Basrur	
2023	Ganapath	"Sara Zamana"	White Noise Studios	Priya Saraiya	Benny Dayal	
2024	Murder Mubarak	"Murder Mubarak"	Sachin-Jigar	Priya Saraiya	Yashraj, Sachin-Jigar	

=== Non-film songs ===
Year	Title	Co-singer(s)	Ref.
2018	Sudhar Ja	Sukriti Kakar	
2019	Mafiyaan	Sukriti Kakar	
2019	Aa Jaana	Darshan Raval	
2020	Kehndi Haan Kehndi Na	Sukriti Kakar	
2020	Tum Na Ho	Arjun Kanungo	
2020	Mashallah	Sukriti Kakar, THEMXXNLIGHT	
2020	Hum Tum	Sukriti Kakar	
2021	Sona Lagda	Sukriti Kakar, Sukhe	
2021	Levitating (Indian Remix)	Dua Lipa, Sukriti Kakar	
2021	Majnu	Sukriti Kakar, Mellow D	
2021	Satrangi Piya	Samarth Swarup	
2022	Single Saiyaan	Sukriti Kakar	
2022	Dobara	Sukriti Kakar	
2022	Kya Say?	Sukriti Kakar, Badshah	
2023	Over You	Sukriti Kakar	
