= Fruit and Nut =

Fruit and Nut may refer to:

- Fruit and Nut (film), 2009
- Fruit and Nut, a variant of the Cadbury Dairy Milk chocolate bar
