= Aasma =

Indian pop-rock group

- Origin: India
- Genre: Pop
- Years active: 2003–2013
- Label: Times Music
- Past members: Neeti Mohan; Jimmy Felix; Sangeet Haldipur; Vasudha Sharma

Aasma was an Indian pop group that formed in 2003, and was composed of the winners of the second season of Indian version of the international television talent show Popstars, named Coke [V] Popstars, after its principal sponsors, Coca-Cola and music channel Channel V India. It was India's first boy and girl band.

== Background ==
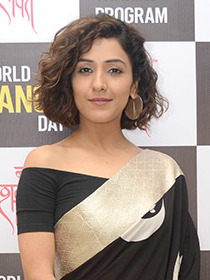
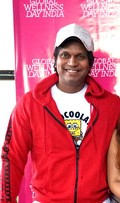
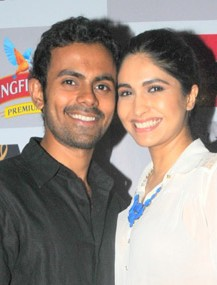
From left: Three of the four members of Aasma – Neeti Mohan, Jimmy Felix and Sangeet Haldipur.

The four original members were Neeti Mohan, Jimmy Felix, Sangeet Haldipur (brother of A Band of Boys member), and Vasudha Sharma. (Note: Two other members are mentioned—Peyush Dixit and Aamir Ali—in an article on Mid-day, but there is no further information on them.) The band released two albums, self-titled debut album Aasma (2004) and a sophomore album, The Infinite (2005). Following the second album, they did not release any subsequent records.

There has been no official report about the group's split and they have continued their musical careers as individual artists. Felix mentioned in an interview with New Indian Express that "All four of us are still part of the band Aasma and we are like family. We have not worked together in a long time now, but we have evolved individually as musicians." Haldipur explained in an October 2021 interview with Hindustan Times that, "Two years down the line after Aasma was formed, we saw a fall in indie pop as a genre but we didn't stop working together. In fact, we worked till 2013 when we did a gig together. But by that time, a lot of people felt that we had disbanded."

== Discography ==
- Aasma (2004)
- The Infinite (2005)
- Remix (2005)
- Kya Mast Hai Life

== See also ==
- Viva (band)
- A Band of Boys
