= Siddharth Haldipur =

Indian singer and music director

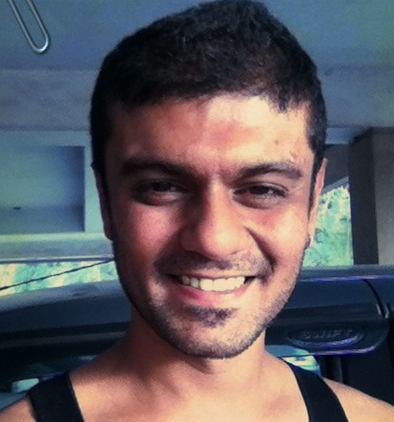

Background information
- Genres: Indian film music, Bollywood Music
- Occupations: Music director, singer, actor, pop artist, composer
- Years active: 2002–present

Siddharth Haldipur is an Indian singer and music director. He is a part of the Sangeet-Siddharth music director duo. The duo has given music for prominent Hindi as well as Marathi movies. In their few years of music direction, the duo has composed hit songs for Murder 2, Blood Money, Aatma, Fruit & Nut, Bird Idol and Hum Hai Raahi Car Ke. Siddharth Haldipur made his foray into music with A Band of Boys and is also a trained violinist, pianist, and dancer. He and Sangeet Haldipur are the sons of the famous composer Amar Haldipur, who has also been India's number one violinist in the past.

== Career ==
Haldipur started his singing with his first album Yeh Bhi Woh Bhi in 2002 in collaboration with his newly boy band member A Band of Boys. Then, in 2005, his second album Gaane Bhi Do Yaaro was released which marked ABOB's final album before their disbanded in 2006. In 2009, apart from singing, he also begin to composed with his brother Sangeet Haldipur for their first film Fruit and Nut. Then, they rose to prominence with their top-of-the-line composition "Aa Zara Kareeb Se", from the movie Murder 2, for which they won the Big Star Young Entertainer Award for Best Music Composer in 2012. This marked their entry into the mainstream Bollywood music scene.

== Discography ==
=== Music director (Sangeet Siddharth) ===
- Fruit and Nut (2009)
- Bird Idol (2010)
- Murder 2 (2011) - 3 songs
- Blood Money (2012)
- Once Upon the Tracks of Mumbai (2012 novel)
- Nasha (2013)
- Aatma - Feel It Around You (2013)
- Hum Hai Raahi Car Ke (2013)
- Mad About Dance (2014)
- Untitled (2015)
- Love Games (2016)
- Raaz Reboot

Marathi Movies

- Runh (2015, Marathi)

TV serials

Ek Boond Ishq – Title track – Life OK (2013)

=== Singer/writer/performer (A Band of Boys) ===
Album – Yeh Bhi Woh Bhi (2002)

- Meri Neend
- Gori
- Tera Chehra
- Ishq
- Thirchi Nazar
- She Drives Me Crazy
- Elements (Aayi Ho Jabse)

Album – Gaane Bhi Do Yaaro (2006)

- Nain Kataari
- Funkh With You
- Aa Bhi Jaa Ae Mere Humdum
- Sunlo Zaraa
- Jhoomengi Bahaaren
- Aaye Aaye
- Mast Kalandar
- Main Chal Diya

=== Filmography ===
Kiss Kis Ko – Himself (2004)
