= Karan Oberoi (singer) =

Indian singer and television actor

Karan B Oberoi
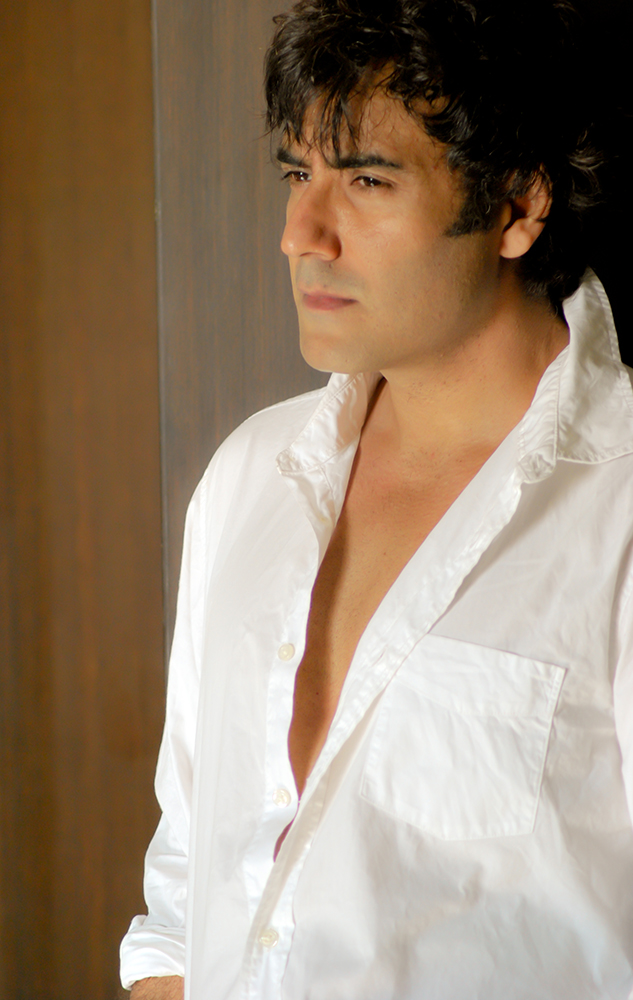
- Karan B Oberoi in 2011
- Born: Amritsar, India
- Other name: Karan B Oberoi
- Occupations: Singer, actor, producer, published author
- Years active: 1995-present
- Known for: A Band of Boys, "Meri neend"
- Website: www.karanoberoi.in

Karan B Oberoi is an Indian television actor and singer. and Published Author. He is mainly known as a singer with an Indi-pop boy band, A Band of Boys. He has done supporting character roles in television serials such as Jassi Jaisi Koi Nahin, Swabhimaan, Dishayen and had a bit part in Inside Edge (TV series).

== Career ==
Karan B Oberoi worked in the Merchant Navy before pursuing a career in acting. He started his career in the entertainment industry through acting in television serials followed by singing for Band Of Boys. He got his first role in the TV serial, Swabhimaan an afternoon soap opera aired in 1995, directed by Mahesh Bhatt, followed by Saaya in 1998. He also played the role of Rajive in Dishayen.

He is a member of A Band of Boys, which was formed in 2001, after auditions which had 1200 entries, judged by Hariharan, Lesle Lewis, Vinod Nair and Manu Kumaaran. The band made their debut with album Yeh Bhi Woh Bhi featuring the number Meri neend. The band did a movie titled Kiss Kisko in 2004.

Oberoi played the role of Raghav in Jassi Jaissi Koi Nahin. He was also in serials such as Zindagi Badal Sakta Hai Hadsaa in which he played the role of Inspector Abhimanyu Singh/Abhi. He was also the anchor and host of Antakhshari in zee tv.

In 2024, he released his first extended play A Band of Boys: Reignite in collaboration with his boy band member A Band of Boys, Meghdeep Bose and Pinky Ponnawala.

== Author And Books ==
Karan B Oberoi is Published Author. He has Published 3 books, his first book "Battlefield Brothers" co author by Kiran Nirvan Published in year 2022, His Second one Rockstar in Reverse Published in 2024 and third One Love At First Sex published in 2025.

=== Books ===
Battlefield Brother 2022, Co author by Kiran Nirvan.
Rockstar in Reverse 2024
Love At First Sex 2025

== Personal life ==
Karan is a son of retired Army officer, and his father was a war hero. He was in a brief relationship with TV actress Mona Singh, after they met in 2006.

== Controversies ==
He was arrested on May 5, 2019, following a sexual harassment complaint filed by his former girlfriend. The matter remains sub judice, with proceedings still ongoing in court.

== Filmography ==
=== Film(s) ===
Year	Film(s)	Role	Notes
2004	Kiss Kiss Ko	Karan	Band Of Boys

=== Television ===
Year	TV Shows/Serial	Role	Notes
1995	Swabhimaan	Bobby	His debut television serial
1996–1997	Aahat	Inspector	
1998	Saaya	Karan	
2000	Milan		
2001–2003	Dishayen	Rajiv	
2003	Kuch Kehti Hai Yeh Dhun	Himself	Guest performer as a part of A Band of Boys; Indian musical game reality show
2004	The Great Indian Comedy Show	Host	
2005	Titan Antakshari	Host	
2005-06	Jassi Jaissi Koi Nahin	Raghav Oberoi	
2008	Zindagi Badal Sakta Hai Hadsaa	Inspector Abhimanyu Singh	

=== Web Shows ===
Year	Series	Role	Notes
2017–2021	Inside Edge	Imtiaz Khan	
2022	Mukhbir - The Story of a Spy	Kamal Kapoor	
2026	Anakhee	Randeep Kapoor	YouTube Series

== Discography ==
=== Albums ===
Year	Album	Notes
2002	Yeh Bhi Woh Bhi	Debut album
2005	Gaane Bhi Do Yaaro	
2024	A Band of Boys: Reignate	
2026	Qaifiyat	
