= Blood Money (2012 film) =

2012 Indian crime thriller film directed by Vishal Mahadkar

- Theatrical release poster
- Directed by: Vishal Mahadkar
- Written by: Upendra Sidhaye
- Produced by: Mukesh Bhatt
- Starring: Kunal Khemu; Amrita Puri; Manish Chaudhari
- Narrated by: Kunal Kemmu
- Cinematography: Nigam Bomzan
- Music by: Songs: Jeet Gannguli; Pranay Rijia; Sangeet Haldipur-Siddharth Haldipur; Background Score: Raju Singh
- Production company: Vishesh Films
- Distributed by: Viacom 18 Motion Pictures
- Release date: 30 March 2012 (India)
- Running time: 109 minutes
- Country: India
- Language: Hindi
- Budget: ₹90 million
- Box office: ₹120 million

Blood Money is a 2012 Indian Hindi-language action thriller film directed by Vishal Mahadkar and produced by Mahesh Bhatt. The film stars Kunal Khemu opposite Amrita Puri in lead roles. It released on 30 March 2012, and received mostly positive response from critics. Blood Money managed to perform moderately well at the box office. Many critics compared the film to the Blood Diamond (2006) The film stars Kunal Khemu, Amrita Puri and Manish Chaudhari in lead roles with Teeshay Shah and Puja Gupta in other important roles.

== Plot ==
Kunal Kadam is a man who believes he can do anything if he tries his hardest. He receives a job offer through his best friend, Sean Mathews, and his wife Nandini in Cape Town and moves there with his wife Aarzoo Kadam. They live a happy life together until Kunal becomes an extreme workaholic. Kunal's nature irritates Aarzoo, which leads to frequent fights. Kunal becomes the most trusted employee of his boss, Dharmesh Zaveri (Rajan Zakaria). This angers Dinesh Zaveri, Dharmesh's younger brother. Kunal advances in his job. Soon Dharmesh is revealed to be an underworld gangster. The company Kunal works for deals with exporting diamonds; Kunal has no idea that it happens illegally. Dharmesh sends his hot colleague Rosa to charm Kunal and takes him away from his wife. Following the day when Kunal gets drunk at a party, Rosa takes advantage and manages to have sex with him. Kunal reaches his house and finds Aarzoo sleeping and accidentally wakes her up, after which they both have a fight. Soon enough, Kunal realizes the crime he is part of and decides to leave Cape Town. However, Dharmesh knows that Kunal is aware of the illegal business, and the only way to keep him silent is to kill him.

Kunal one day tells Aarzoo that Rosa took advantage of him when he was drunk. This leaves Aarzoo shattered, and she returns the diamond pendant given to her by him, writing that she can't live with him anymore and has gone to stay at Sean's house. Sean tries to console Kunal, and in the process, it's revealed that even Sean knows about Dharmesh's evil plans but can't do anything in front of him. He advises Kunal not to oppose him; otherwise, he might end up losing his life. Kunal then gets a call from his boss, who sends him to a place where he unknowingly gives a gun and other weapons in exchange for the diamonds to a terrorist who kills an innocent man in front of him. Kunal feels bad and returns to find that Sean has been killed.

Then, he reveals what wrong had been happening with him and how he wanted to leave this to Aarzoo, who later understands and joins him. Kunal tries to get help from police officer Bobby Kapadia. He asks Kunal to get into Dharmesh's cabin and get his computer's hard disk and a black diary in which he keeps all his records. Kunal manages to get them, but as he is about to go, he is chased by some guards. He gets stabbed by Dinesh but beats him and survives. He fights against all the guards and reaches the plane area, where he gets to know that Bobby was actually working with Dharmesh, whose real name is "Rajan Zakaria," and his plan was to make Kunal reach the plane area where he would kill him. Then Kunal reveals to Dharmesh that it was his plan to make him come to the plane area and that he knew about his identity and thus was playing a game with him. As Dharmesh gets up to hit Kunal, he throws the gun and beats him, till Interpol arrives. Dharmesh is then arrested, and Kunal is taken to safety. Later, it is shown at the end that Kunal and Aarzoo move back to Madh Island, and Kunal is shown reading the Hansel and Gretel story to some little kids, and the film ends with a song.

== Cast ==
- Kunal Khemu as Kunal Kadam
- Amrita Puri as Aarzoo Kadam (Kunal's wife)
- Karan Veer Mehra as Inspector Bobby Kapadia (A police officer in Cape Town)
- Manish Chaudhari as Dharmesh Zaveri (Kunal's boss) / Rajan Zakaria (An underworld don)
- Mia Evonne Uyeda as Rosa Cost (Kunal's colleague)
- Sandeep Sikand as Dinesh Zaveri (Dharmesh's younger brother)
- Shekhar Shukla as Paresh Shah (A customer at Trinity Diamonds)
- Teeshay Shah as Sean Mathews (Kunal's colleague and best friend in Cape Town)
- Puja Gupta as Nandini Mathews (Sean's wife and Aarzoo's best friend in Cape Town)

== Development ==
The film was earlier titled Kalyug 2 and was to be a sequel to 2005's Kalyug. Director Vishal Mahadkar did not appreciate the title and changed it to Jannat 2, making it a sequel to the 2008 hit Jannat. When the public's feedback to this title turned out to be even more negative, it was finally renamed to Blood Money.

== Reception ==
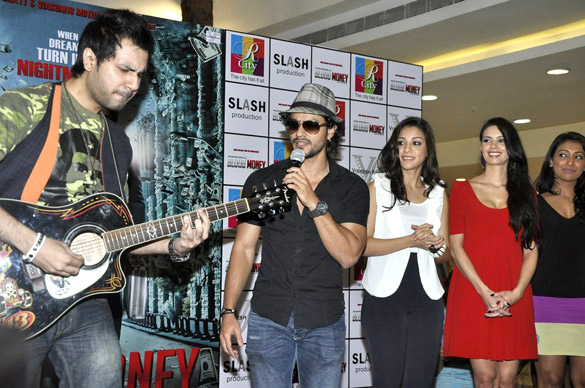
Promotions of Blood Money at R City Mall, Ghatkopar, Mumbai

=== Critical ===
Blood Money received mixed to positive reviews, but Kunal Khemu received a positive response from critics. Jeeturaaj of Radio Mirchi gave it 3.5/5 stars saying "interesting insight into diamond trade and brilliant songs". Madhureeta Mukherjee of Times of India rated the film 3/5 and said "Debutant director, (Vishal S Mahadkar), tells the story well".

Sukanya Verma of Rediff.com gave it 1/5 stars and wrote "Blood Money is exceptionally hollow in its aspirations". Writing for FilmiTadka, Janhavi Patel gave the film 2.5 out of 5 stars and said, "Blood Money starts off decently but goes downhill in the second half with a laughable climax. Spend your money elsewhere". Blessy Chettiar of DNA awarded 2 out of 5 stars and said, "Wait for Blood Money's television premier. Or else, watch the trailer. Why waste 2.5 hours on something you can watch in 2.05 minutes?"

=== Box office ===
Blood Money collected more than 90 million in its full theatrical run in India.

== Soundtrack ==
Blood Money

Studio album by Jeet Ganguly, Pranay M Rijia & Sangeet-Siddharth
- Released: 19 February 2012
- Genre: Feature film soundtrack
- Label: Sony Music India

Blood Money's soundtrack was released on 19 February 2012. It was composed by Jeet Gannguli, Pranay, Sangeet Haldipur, Siddharth Haldipur (Sangeet-Siddharth); lyrics were penned by Sayeed Quadri, Kumaar.

=== Track list ===
No.	Title	Music	Singer(s)	Length
1.	"Chaahat"	Jeet Gannguli	Rahat Fateh Ali Khan	4:24
2.	"Gunaah"	Jeet Gannguli	Mustafa Zahid	4:49
3.	"Teri Yaadon Se"	Pranay	Mustafa Zahid	4:36
4.	"Jo Tere Sang"	Jeet Gannguli	Mustafa Zahid	5:06
5.	"Aarzoo"	Sangeet-Siddharth	Clinton Cerejo	4:17
6.	"Gunaah" (Unplugged)	Jeet Gannguli	Rana Muzumdar	5:38
7.	"Teri Yaadon Se" (Remix)	Pranay; remixed by Kiran Kamath	Mustafa Zahid	5:14
8.	"Jo Tere Sang" (Remix)	Jeet Gannguli; remixed by DJ Savyo	Mustafa Zahid	6:18

=== Reception ===
The album received positive reviews from critics. Joginder Tuteja from Bollywood Hungama gave the album 3.5/5 stars picking "Jo Tere Sang", "Gunaah (unplugged)" and "Chaahat" as his favourites. Musicaloud gave the album 3/5 stars picking "Chaahat" and "Gunaah" as their favourites. Times of India states that "Blood Money, like all previous Bhatt films, has some great music that will help take the movie to a different level altogether".

- Bollywood Hungama
