= Inside Edge (TV series) =

- Promotional poster
- Created by: Karan Anshuman
- Written by: Karan Anshuman; Ananya Mody; Neeraj Udhwani; Nidhie Sharma; Sailesh Ramaswamy
- Starring: Vivek Oberoi; Richa Chadha; Luke Kenny; Sidhant Gupta; Angad Bedi; Aamir Bashir; Sayani Gupta
- Country of origin: India
- Original languages: Hindi; English
- No. of seasons: 3
- No. of episodes: 30

Production
- Executive producers: Ritesh Sidhwani; Farhan Akhtar; Kassim Jagmagia
- Cinematography: Vivek Shah; Sanjay Kapoor
- Camera setup: Single-camera
- Running time: 40–47 minutes
- Production company: Excel Entertainment

Original release
- Network: Amazon Prime Video
- Release: 10 July 2017 – 3 December 2021

Inside Edge is an Indian sports-drama television series created by Karan Anshuman and released on Amazon Prime Video. It premiered on 10 July 2017, and is the first Hindi-language series distributed by Amazon Originals. The series centers on the Mumbai Mavericks, a fictional T20 cricket team, whose owners operate a league-wide spot-fixing syndicate. Inside Edge stars an ensemble cast, featuring Vivek Oberoi, Richa Chada, Siddhant Chaturvedi, Tanuj Virwani, Angad Bedi, Sayani Gupta, Aamir Bashir, and Sapna Pabbi, as well as Manu Rishi, Amit Sial, Karan Oberoi, and Asha Saini.

Inside Edge has received positive critical reception and was nominated for Best Drama series at 46th International Emmy Awards. The second season premiered on 6 December 2019. The show was also renewed for a third season that premiered on 3 December 2021.

== Premise ==
=== Season 1 ===
Inside Edge is the story of the Mumbai Mavericks, a T20 cricket franchise playing in the Powerplay League. Set in a landscape of conflicting interests, where selfishness is almost a virtue, where money and power go hand in hand, the series traces the ups and downs in the Powerplay league as the Mumbai Mavericks face ownership problems along with accusations of match fixing.

=== Season 2 ===
In the next edition of the PPL, Vayu Raghavan leads the Mumbai Mavericks to face the Arvind Vashisht-led Haryana Hurricanes. They must also counter scandals that change the game of cricket.

=== Season 3 ===
In the third season, the series moves on towards international cricket, with Vayu competing against Indian captain Rohit. Meanwhile, Dhawan swears revenge on Bhaisaab, and uses his alliance with Zarina to accomplish it.

== Cast ==
=== Main ===
- Vivek Oberoi as Vikrant Dhawan, the owner of one of the world's leading sports management companies. (season 1–3)
- Richa Chadda as Zarina Malik, a fading actress and co-owner of the Mumbai Mavericks. (season 1–3)
- Tanuj Virwani as Vayu Raghavan, the moody, hothead star player and later captain of the Mavericks, and Mantra's boyfriend. (season 1–3)
- Siddhant Chaturvedi as Prashant Kanaujia, a rookie fast bowler who joins the Mavericks, and befriends Vayu. (season 1–2)
- Angad Bedi as Arvind Vashishth, an ex-international player and the captain of the Mavericks, who later becomes captain of the Haryana Hurricanes. (season 1–2)
- Sayani Gupta as Rohini Raghavan, Vayu's sister and the chief analyst of the Mavericks, and later, the Hurricanes and Indian Team. (season 1–3)
- Aamir Bashir as Yashvardhan Patil/Bhaisahab, the President of Indian Cricket Board and the founder of the PowerPlay League. (season 2–3)
- Sapna Pabbi as Mantra Patil, co-owner of Mumbai Mavericks, Yashvardhan's daughter, and Vayu's girlfriend. (season 2–3)
- Akshay Oberoi as Rohit Shanbagh, captain of Indian Cricket Team. (season 3)
- Sidhant Gupta as Imaad Akbar (season 3)

=== Recurring ===
- Amit Sial as Devender Mishra, an off-spinner who dislikes Prashant, and follows the same career path as Arvind. (season 1–3)
- Manu Rishi as Manoharlal Handa, a rich, eccentric businessman and owner of the Haryana Hurricanes. (season 1–3)
- Karan Oberoi as Imtiaz Khan, an actor and Zarina's ex-boyfriend. (season 1–3)
- Flora Saini as Ayesha Dewan, Handa's partner and a power broker. She later becomes owner of the Bangalore Blitzers. (season 1–3)
- Akashdeep Arora as Tanay, a team analyst for the Mavericks. (season 1–2)
- Gaurav Sharma as Moses Alexander, Ex India Wicketkeeper and the head coach of the Mavericks after Niranjan Suri. (season 1–2)
- Vidya Malvade as Tisha Chopra, an ex-India International and bowling coach of the Haryana Hurricanes. (season 2)
- Sarah-Jane Dias as Meera Nagpal, a journalist and Vayu's ex-girlfriend. (season 1)
- Natasha Suri as Mysterious Lady, associate to Vikrant Dhawan and Yashvardhan Patil/Bhaisahab. (season 1)
- Luke Kenny as Wolfgang Hummels, an anti-doping official. (season 2–3)
- Himanshi Choudhry as Sudha Dhawan, Vikrant's wife. (season 1–3)
- Elli Avram as Sandy, Cheerleader of Mumbai Mavericks and Prashant's girlfriend. (season 2)
- Alexx O'Nell as Craig Litner, vice-captain of the Mavericks. (season 1)
- Ogunro Gbolabo Lucas as Dwight Johnson, a fast bowler for the Mavericks. (season 1–2)
- Aahana Kumra as Shahana Vashishth, Arvind's estranged wife. (season 1)
- Sanjay Suri as Niranjan Suri, the head coach of the Mavericks. (season 1)
- Abhishek Banerjee as Drug Dealer. (season 1)
- Manuj Sharma as K. R. Raghunath, Wicketkeeper and Opening Batsman of Mavericks. (season 1)
- Jitin Gulati as Pritish, Vikrant's right hand man later revealed to be Bhaisahab's man. (season 1–3)
- Chirag Sethi as Anees Iqbal, key batsman cricketer of Mumbai Mavericks, later revealed as a fixer batsman playing under Dhawan. (season 1)
- Sunny Hinduja as Sultan Ali Khan, Pakistan Cricket Team captain. (season 3)
- Renuka Shahane as Prime Minister of India (season 3)
- Ankur Vikal as Azeem Khan, Coach (season 3)
- Ankur Rathee as Allen Manezes, gay rights lawyer and love of Rohit Shanbagh (season 3)
- Dalip Tahil as Judge Roy (season 3)
- Prasanna Ketkar as Yashwardhan and Vikrant's father (Season 3)
- Ankith Madhav as Doshi (season 2)

== Series overview ==
Series	Episodes	Originally released
1	10	10 July 2017
2	10	6 December 2019
3	10	3 December 2021

=== Season 1 (2017) ===
No.	Title	Directed by	Written by	Original release date
1	"PowerPlay"	Karan Anshuman	Karan Anshuman	10 July 2017
Zarina Malik, co- owner of the Mumbai Mavericks, races against time to find a new financial partner, or risk losing the team. Series of conspiracies and high profile calls lead to sabotage of co-owner selection, all in favor of Vikrant Dhawan. Meanwhile the team has a young recruit from a drastically different social and economic backdrop to fill in for reserve players, who gets his first taste of the big, bad world of the PPL.
2	"Bunny"	Karan Anshuman	Ameya Sarda	10 July 2017
With memory of Dhawan cornering Zarina last night into physical confrontation, she realizes she's made a deal with the devil. She approaches team's former co-owner to rescind the deal which fails owing to legal obligations. Prashant continues to struggle to adapt to his new surroundings. Episode introduces recurring character Huda as owner for another team. Vayu is shown relapsing into drugs and voyeurism to escape from last breakup, putting his career at risk.
3	"Inner Circle"	Karan Anshuman	Puneet Krishna	10 July 2017
The team is in Chennai to take on their arch rivals. Hosts and their accommodation and training ground arrangements for Mumbai run extremely hostile on account of Vayu having ditched playing for Chennai in past. Rohini helps crack arm movements on rival spin bowler. Dhawan continues to pull a cross on Zarina interfering with her endorsement and film career outside team ownership. Meanwhile, the story progresses with a mysterious figure taking stock of the team, revealing strings of blackmails and threats on vulnerable players.
4	"Wrong Foot"	Karan Anshuman	Puneet Krishna	10 July 2017
The team is at an endorsement shoot. Dhawan's masterplan is close to becoming reality. Vayu makes headway with Meera; Arvind confronts problems closer to home.
5	"Away Game"	Karan Anshuman	Sumit Purohit	10 July 2017
A forgotten past comes back to haunt Coach Suri. Vayu can't deal with the pressure from the media. Meanwhile, Prashant has been practicing hard; will his efforts pay off?
6	"Opening Bid"	Karan Anshuman; Gurmmeet Singh	Saurav Dey	10 July 2017
It's matchday! Mavericks vs Hurricanes. Dhawan's grand plan is finally coming together. However, the smallest cog in the wheel can upset the best laid plans.
7	"FoW"	Karan Anshuman	Ameya Sarda	10 July 2017
Things are coming to a head. Zarina, Arvind, Prashant, Vayu all face crises of their own. The pressure is too much, and something has to give…
8	"Corridor of Uncertainty"	Karan Anshuman	Sumit Purohit	10 July 2017
Dhawan goes into damage control mode as secrets start to spill out, but there is a silver lining for him.
9	"Hammer Price"	Karan Anshuman	Saurav Dey	10 July 2017
Arvind's vulnerability triggers a chain reaction. An old friend shows up to advise Zarina. And can Vayu pull himself together at this crucial time?
10	"Maximum"	Karan Anshuman	Karan Anshuman	10 July 2017
The finals of the PowerPlay League is here. But the question is of the larger game. Who will win?

=== Season 2 (2019) ===
No.	Title	Directed by	Written by	Original release date
1	"Run down"	Aakash Bhatia	Karan Anshuman; Ameya Sarda	6 December 2019
Cliffhangers from last season end are revealed to audience. Bhai sahab is revealed to be the president of Indian Cricket Board. Dhawan survives the attack and plots his comeback. The rivalry of Arvind now with Huda’s hurricanes and Vayu captaining mavericks is shown to form this season’s central stage. New faces and characters are introduced.
2	"Paddle Sweep"	Aakash Bhatia	Saurav Dey; Niren Bhatt	6 December 2019
Bidding for players in new PPL series starts. Mavericks force hurricanes to over spend on their first two bids including captain Arvind. Hurricanes return power move by chasing the bids on Prashant. Rohini passes on her list of rare underdogs find to Arvind after she’s unable to convince Vayu to let Mavericks bid for them. Zarina sees her film career zooming ahead thanks to her collusion with Bhai Sahab.
3	"Hawk-Eye"	Aakash Bhatia	Karan Anshuman; Ameya Sarda	6 December 2019
Bhai sahab moves PPL to South Africa in response to Indian politician Wadhwa blocking its run in India. Minister faces backslash on revenue loss. Mavericks face battle against Hurricanes with both captains striving to establish the power status early in the series. Huda attempts a secret maneuver unknown to his captain. Wadhwa's union halts production of Zarina’s film. Bhaisahab rescues the situation, earning Zarina’s loyalty and recruiting her as key ally to their team.
4	"Doctored"	Karan Anshuman; Gurmmeet Singh	Saurav Dey; Niren Bhatt	6 December 2019
Prashant hallucinates Devendra Mishra and struggles psychologically. Vayu's performs under pressure and loses to Haryana Hurricanes. Vayu confronts Rohini on passing on list of underdogs to Arvind after being alerted to it during post-analysis. Huda fears presence of anti doping official in stadium. Dhawan continues to collude from shadows drawing his chess pieces.
5	"Block Hole"	Aakash Bhatia	Karan Anshuman; Ameya Sarda	6 December 2019
Dhawan creates ruckus by ousting Bhai Sahab after connecting the dots on him funding Pakistan Board of Cricket. Mavericks score their first win in PPL but Vayu is miffed at his form. Huda’s medical doping brings out ugly side-affects on some players. Vayu faces pressure to drop Prashant from game who finds solace in his troubled times in moments shared with Sandy.
6	"Turn"	Aakash Bhatia	Karan Anshuman; Ameya Sarda	6 December 2019
Bhai sahab faces heat at ICB Board meet and CBI Enquiry. His team jumps into control mode to discredit evidences and silence whistleblowers. Vayu gets caught on CCTV stealing from liquor shop. At onset of facing rustication, Vayu pulls an outstanding win against Hurricanes. Rohini is dismissed from team by angry Vayu after she’s back from their father’s death, flashback reveals their childhood trauma and abusive side of father.
7	"Yo Yo"	Karan Anshuman; Gurmmeet Singh	Saurav Dey; Niren Bhatt	6 December 2019
Enraged at Hurricane’s loss, Arvind manhandles one of the player to confession. Huda’s medical tampering is out in open. Arvind removes them from next playing set. Rohini moves to Hurricanes and suggests new batting order to reach expected winning targets but still sees Hurricane losing to Chennai. Meanwhile Zarina and team needs more money than ever to buy votes for ICB Election and she tries to recruit one more maverick player for spot fixing. In turn of table, anti-fixes cause Bhai sahab to lose their bet, but also reveals them to Dhawan’s presence back in game.
8	"Crossing The Line"	Aakash Bhatia	Saurav Dey; Niren Bhatt	6 December 2019
It's a must-win situation for Arvind's floundering bits-and-pieces team. Zarina takes matters into her own hands on learning her darkest nightmares are true. And Bhaisaab unleashes his most ruthless avatar yet.
9	"Four Slips And A Gully"	Aakash Bhatia	Karan Anshuman; Ameya Sarda	6 December 2019
A dark night in the gallows brings light to some. Zarina demands her pound of flesh. And Bhaisaab's carefully laid out plans begin to unravel.
10	"Switch Hit"	Karan Anshuman; Gurmmeet Singh	Saurav Dey; Niren Bhatt	6 December 2019
While the cricketers battle it out on the field in a PPL final in which it's hard to pick favorites, Bhaisaab belts out his sharpest blows in an all-or-nothing crusade to retain his dominion.

=== Season 3 (2021) ===
No.	Title	Directed by	Written by	Original release date
1	"Domestic Games"	Kanishk Varma	Neeraj Udhwani; Karan Anshuman	3 December 2021
The Roy Commission is set up to investigate corruption in cricket. In an all out war between Dhawan and Bhaisaab, Zarina Malik is pressured to pick a side.
2	"Devil's Number"	Kanishk Varma	Nidhie Sharma; Neeraj Udhwani	3 December 2021
An insidious operation is underway to secure the TV broadcast rights in the auctions for the upcoming international series. A revelation from the past threatens to destroy the life that Vayu and Rohini have built.
3	"Captain's Knock"	Kanishk Varma	Neeraj Udhwani	3 December 2021
It's the finals of the Wadia Cup and the selectors must choose between Vayu and Rohit as captain of India. Mantra finds her raison d'etre, Rohini sinks deep into her quest of challenging the past.
4	"Take the light"	Kanishk Varma	Nidhie Sharma; Karan Anshuman	3 December 2021
The Roy Commission comes to a surprising conclusion based on facts from an unexpected source. Vayu and Rohit battle it off the field in the arena of sponsorships.
5	"Swing and a miss"	Kanishk Varma	Nidhie Sharma	3 December 2021
Mantra goes public with her campaign. Zarina is on the verge of true power, only to be challenged by an unexpected contender at the last minute. The Indian team resents its new rookie.
6	"Not Quite Cricket"	Kanishk Varma	Neeraj Udhwani; Karan Anshuman	3 December 2021
It's the first test between India and Pakistan, and the best laid plans...
7	"Sticky Wicket"	Kanishk Varma	Sailesh Ramaswami	3 December 2021
Mantra is pushed into the corner as she negotiates impossible odds. Match fixing rears its ugly head, but the stakes are a lot more than mere money this time. Imaad's stellar performance in the previous match results in his biggest nightmare coming to life.
8	"Test"	Kanishk Varma	Sailesh Ramaswamy; Karan Anshuman	3 December 2021
The second game against Pakistan is a test in the truest sense, a crucible of interference from the outside as the powers that be activate a game behind the game. The players must battle the opposition on the field and outside of it.
9	"Castled"	Kanishk Varma	Karan Anshuman; Ananya Mody	3 December 2021
It's time for scores to be settled. Victory at all costs: using compassion or subterfuge, using words or... bullets.
10	"Cricket is the winner"	Kanishk Varma	Karan Anshuman; Ananya Mody	3 December 2021
As India take on Pakistan in the final test, the gentleman's game is incinerated, giving rise to a new cricketing order from its ashes.

== Reception ==
The series has received critical acclaim for performance and storyline. The acting performance of Siddhant Chaturvedi, Vivek Oberoi, Tanuj Virvani, Richa Chadha, Sayani Gupta and Angad Bedi has been especially praised. India Today called the series "perfectly cast and technically first rate". The Indian Express praised the performance of all actors saying that "web-series packs interesting punch shouldered by some honest performances" and also stated that the shows quality hasn't been compromised just because web series is a far smaller medium than films. Firstpost positively reviewed the series saying "the characters are so seamlessly integrated into the narrative that it does not feel like a make believe world".

== Accolades ==
Year	Award	Category	Nomination	Result
2018	46th International Emmy Awards	Best Drama Series	Inside Edge	Nominated

== See also ==
- Cricket in film and television
