= Swabhimaan =

Television series

- Genre: Drama
- Created by: Amit Khanna
- Written by: Shobha De; Vinod Ranganathan; Surabhi Pandey (Dialogue writer)
- Starring: see below
- Opening theme: "Ek Pal" by Sunita Rao, "Kaise Unhein Bhool Jaye" by Shaan
- Country of origin: India
- Original language: Hindi
- No. of seasons: 1
- No. of episodes: 800

Production
- Camera setup: Multi-camera
- Running time: 25 minutes

Original release
- Network: DD National
- Release: 6 April 1995 – 1 May 1998

Swaabhimaan (Hindi pronunciation: [sʋɑːbʱɪ.mɑːn]; transl. self-respect) is an Indian soap opera directed by Mahesh Bhatt and Debaloy Dey and was scripted by Shobha De and Vinod Ranganath.

== Plot ==
Swaabhimaan divulges the story of an attractive woman - Svetlana - who finds herself in a battle where there are no real winners. Insecurity, suspicion and fear threaten to erode her vivacious spirit as she struggles to come to terms with her position - that of a pampered mistress whose tycoon patron Keshav Malhotra dies leaving her to cope with the ugly aftermath of the tragedy: inheritance wars, succession rights, property entanglements, petty quarrels and above all, emotional turmoil that threatens to destroy her.

== Cast ==
Character	Actor
Svetlana	Kitu Gidwani
Ronnie Banerjee	Abhimanyu Singh
Ranjana Devi	Anju Mahendru
Mahendra Malhotra	Deepak Parashar
Nishi Malhotra	Kunickaa Sadanand
Rishabh Malhotra	Rohit Roy
Medha Hegde	Channa Ruparel
Abhijeet	Vinod Pandey
Sheela	Prabha Sinha
Ritu Malhotra	Sheetal Thakkar
Tyagi	Ashutosh Rana
Sunil	Manoj Bajpayee
Grover	Sharad Kapoor
Neetu	Rinku Dhawan
Bobby	Karan Oberoi (singer)
Soha	Achint Kaur
Babli	Tanaaz Currim
Yuvraj	Anupam Bhattacharya
Shivani	Sandhya Mridul
Kunwar Singh	Arun Bali
Karan	Harsh Chhaya
Gayatri	Simone Singh
Devika	Mita Vashisht
Rakshanda	Sagarika Soni
Rakshanda's Husband Ranjeet	Rajesh Khera
Dinesh Shah	Pankaj Berry
Rashmi	Poonam Dasgupta
Eknath	Kumud Mishra
Rajat	Mukesh Khanna
KD	Shishir Sharma
Walter	Rajeev Paul
Maitri	Kiran Juneja
Bansal	Vineet Kumar
Daughter	Shana Sood
Keshav Malhotra	Nasir Abdullah
Tauji	R. S. Chopra
Khabri	Pratima Kazmi
