= Gaurav Arora =

Indian actor model (born 1985 or 1986)

- Born: Mungaoli, Madhya Pradesh, India
- Education: Daly College
- Occupations: Actor; model
- Years active: 2006–present
- Known for: Raaz: Reboot; Love Games
- Modeling information
- Height: 1.85 m (6 ft 1 in)
- Hair color: Black
- Eye color: Brown

Gaurav Arora is an Indian actor and model. He was the second runner-up in the Gladrags Manhunt and Megamodel Contest in 2006. He has appeared in numerous print-shoots and television commercials for various brands. He has been a part of the major fashion shows, and modeled for a number of Indian designers.

Arora made his film debut with Vishesh Films and Vikram Bhatt's Hindi film Love Games (2016) alongside Tara Alisha Berry and Patralekha. He played the male lead named Sameer Saxena. This was followed by another pivot role of Rehaan Khanna in Vishesh Films Raaz: Reboot (2016).

Arora made his web series debut with Broken But Beautiful season 2 (2019), also starring Vikrant Massey and Harleen Sethi, created by Ekta Kapoor for ALT Balaji. He played Ahan Chatterji.

== Personal life ==
Gaurav Arora was born in Mungaoli, Ashoknagar district of Madhya Pradesh. His parents are Ravi and Radha Arora. He has an elder sister, Anshu, and a younger sister, Mahek. He attended Daly College, Indore and later earned a Bachelor of Business Administration degree from Prestige Institute of Management and Research. He was a national-level swimmer, and a district-level hockey player.

== Career ==
After completing his education, Arora moved to Mumbai to pursue a career in modelling and acting.

=== Debut and breakthrough ===
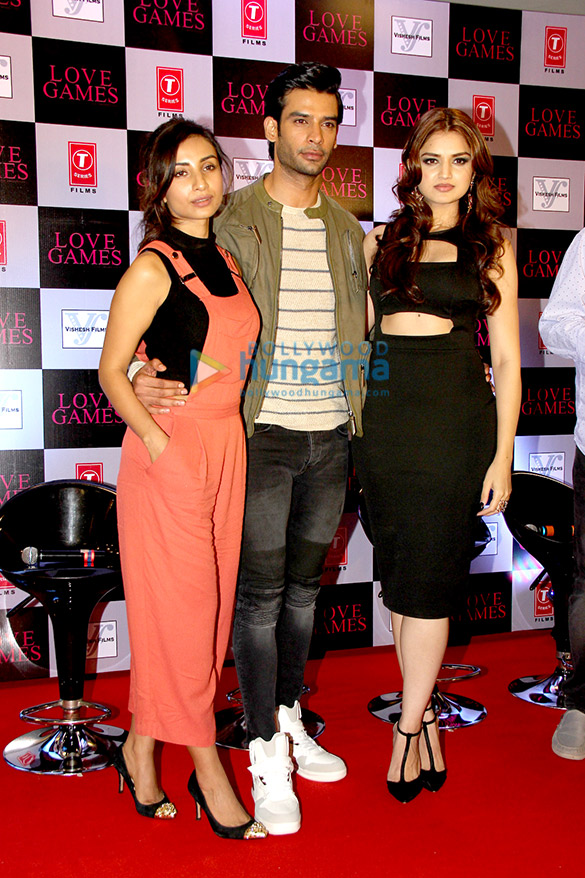
Arora with Patralekha and Tara Alisha Berry at a press event for Love Games

Gaurav Arora made his acting debut with Vishesh Films' Love Games in 2016. He portrayed the lead role of Sameer Saxena, a depressed rich drug addict guy, who does self-harm, parties hard and plays love games around with Ramona Raichand (Patralekha). The story of the film shows how his life changes when he meets Alisha (Tara Alisha Berry) and falls in love with her, and what all he does to win her against all odds. This film was shot in Cape Town, South Africa. It is an urban thriller directed by Vikram Bhatt.

Arora received his breakthrough in the thriller and horror genre film Raaz: Reboot (2016), where he played the lead role of Rehaan Khanna, an introvert and intense guy. This film met with mixed to positive reviews. However Arora's performance earned critical acclaim and was better received. As per Mumbai Mirror "Gaurav Arora perseveres to lend dignity to his character and has done a fine job." Deccan Chronicle said " Just one - film old Gaurav Arora quite literally steals the show. It is commendable how he sweeps away all the attention despite having an established actor Emraan in the film."

=== Web series ===
Arora has been cast for Voot's psychological thriller web series Asura which as of December 2018 was being shot.

=== Theatre ===
Arora has done theatre too. While he groomed himself as a model, he simultaneously became a part of theatre group. He has been on stage for several plays across the country. Some of them are "The night of January 16th", "The Mousetrap " and "And Then There Were None".

=== Modelling ===
Arora participated in Gladrags Manhunt and Megamodel Contest in 2006, and won the second runner-up title. He subsequently opted to work as a model, and act in theatre. He was soon a successful runway model. He was amongst the winners of Elle (India) fresh face of the year 2010 title. He was counted as one of the fittest male Supermodels by Men's health magazine in 2011. In 2013, he was listed amongst the most desirable Indian men (objects of desire) by Vogue India.

Arora has worked with the top leading designers in India including Manish Malhotra, Rohit Bal, Tarun Tahiliani, Raghavendra Rathore and others. He has walked the ramp for the major fashion weeks in the country, like Lakme Fashion Week, India Fashion Week, Indian couture week, Amazon India fashion week, and many more. As a model, he has represented India overseas too, in countries like the United States, Canada, Dubai and Thailand. Arora is considered amongst the top Supermodels of India. He has endorsed several leading brands in the country. Some of his television commercials include Gillette (brand), 7Up, Honda, Maruti Suzuki, Nyle body lotion (CavinKare), WB Channel, Keya food products and JW Marriott Hotels. He has appeared in commercials of QMobile, for Pakistan also. He has done print-shoots to endorse various brands like Provogue, Raymond Group, Mufti, Reliance, John Miller, Bajaj Group, Spykar, Gesture and many more. He has shot for few fashion magazines like Vogue (magazine) and GQ, and appeared for Bronze Age editorial with Lisa Haydon for Vogue India. He was recognised as one of the top Indian male Supermodels by Mandate magazine in 2013. Gaurav has done a short film for GQ (Indian edition) named Glow Key, which was shot in Bali, Indonesia, and which brought him much acclaim as a model.

== Filmography ==
Year	Title	Role	Notes
2016	Love Games	Sameer Saxena	
2016	Raaz: Reboot	Rehaan Khanna	
2019	Broken But Beautiful	Ahan Chatterji	Season 2
2020	Asur	Kesar Bharadwaj	
2021	Kaali Peeli Tales	Vijay Saxena	Episode: Fish Fry Aur Coffee
2022	Aadha Ishq	Saahir Singh	
2023	Asur 2	Kesar Bharadwaj	

== Awards and nominations ==
Year	Award	Category	Film	Result
2016	Stardust Awards	Best Debut Male	Love Games	Nominated
