= Sachin Nayak =

Indian actor (born 1977)

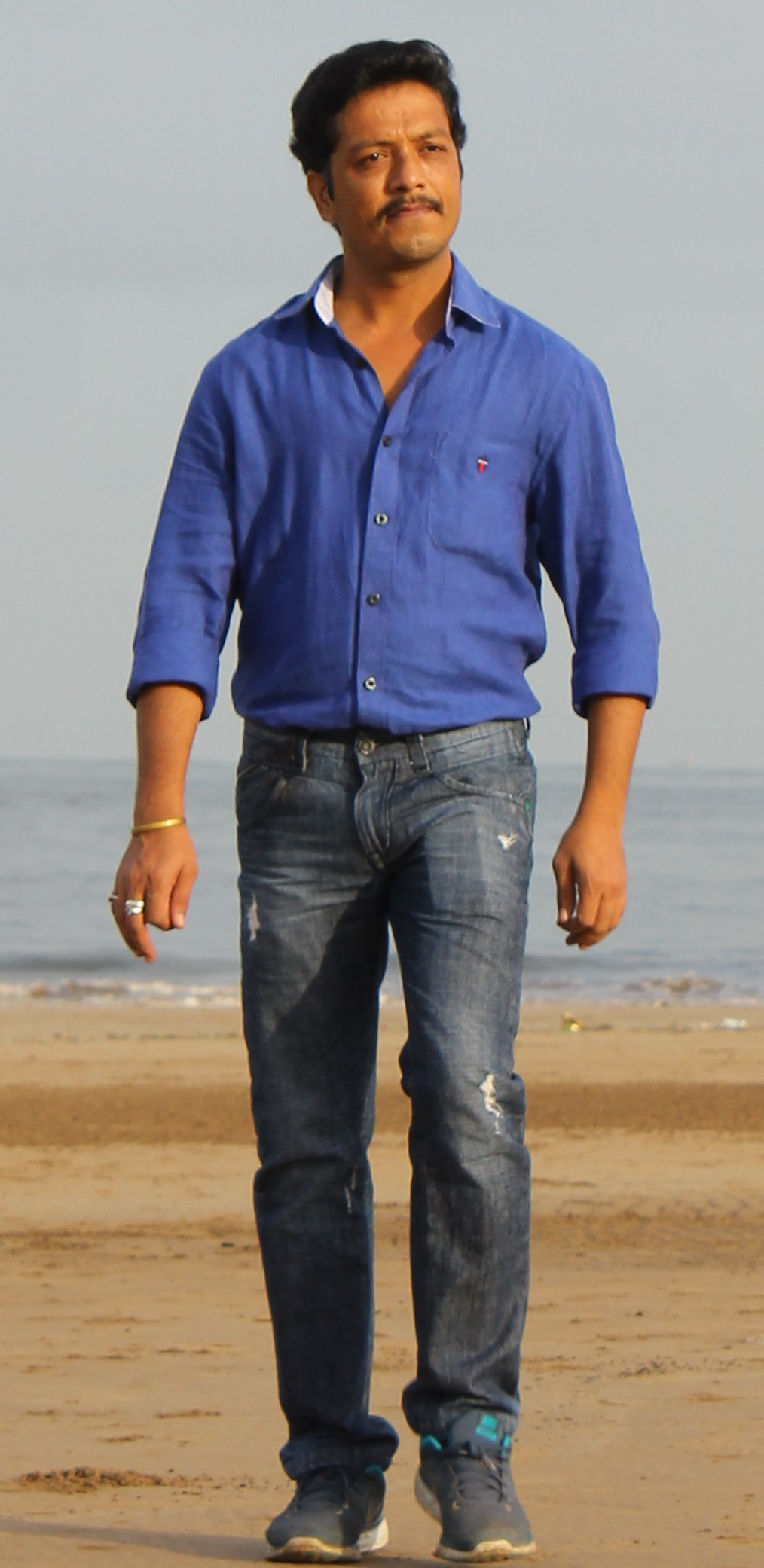
- Sachin Nayak in 2013
- Born: Sachin Nayak; 21 August 1977 (age 48); Sagar, Madhya Pradesh, India
- Occupation: Actor
- Years active: 2005-present

Sachin Nayak is an Indian actor and model, known primarily for his roles in Bollywood films. He was born in the village of Tada, in the Sagar, Madhya Pradesh district. He studied in Dr. Hari Singh Gour University with a post graduate degree in the Sociology. Nayak began acting at the age of 8. He appeared in Rajat Kapoor's 2009 film Siddharth: The Prisoner. He has appeared in over 150 Hindi films and TV commercials.

== Filmography ==
=== Films ===
Year	Film	Role	Notes
2007	Migration		
2008	My name is Anthony	Casting Director(In Film)	
2009	Siddharth: The Prisoner	Mohan	
2009	Fruit and Nut	Anna	
2013	Special 26	Bela Boy	
2013	Nirrankush		Filming
2014	Singham Returns	Bhola	
2015	Round Figure		In Production
2015	Baat Ban Gayi		Filming
2015	Dare You		Filming

=== Television ===
Year	Serial	Role	Channel
2007	Hero - Bhakti Hi Shakti Hai	Umbrella Man	Hungama TV
2008	Raja Ki Aayegi Baraat	Viru/Virendra(Thief)	STAR Plus
2010	Mrs. and Mr. Sharma Allahabadwale	Raja Chor	SAB TV
2008	Miley Jab Hum Tum	Chinu	STAR One
2011	Ek Din Achanak	Manohar	Doordarshan
2014	Crime Patrol	Various Roles	Sony

== TV commercials ==
Sachin has acted in more than 150 ad films. He is famous by the Happydent White advertisement in 2006 which got Cannes award for Best Ad. and Best Music in 2006. He has featured in advertisement for Master Chef India and for Biggest Loser Jeetega. He acted in advertisement of Orpat fan, Jinjola talcum powder, Tata AIG, Pepsi, Birla White Cement, Coca-Cola, Tide, Intel, Subhiksha Mobile, list goes longer...
