= Sangeet-Siddharth =

- Genres: Indian film music, Bollywood Music
- Occupations: Music Director, Composer
- Years active: 2008–present

Sangeet-Siddharth is a music composer duo of brothers Siddharth Haldipur and Sangeet Haldipur. The duo rose to prominence with their top-of-the-line composition ‘Aa Zara Kareeb Se’ from the movie Murder 2, for which they won the Big Star Young Entertainer Award for Best Music Composer in 2012. This marked their entry into the mainstream Bollywood music scene.

== Early life ==
Siddharth and Sangeet Haldipur are the sons of the famous composer Amar Haldipur, who was India's number one violinist and is still regarded as Bollywood's best background music composer.

== Career ==
Siddharth made his foray into music with A Band of Boys and is also a trained violinist, pianist, and dancer. He left the band around 2006. Sangeet was a member of the Indian pop group Aasma, composed of the winners of the second season of Coke [V] Popstars. Although there has been no official report about the group's split, all four members have continued their musical careers as individual artists. (Note: Two other members are mentioned—Peyush Dixit and Aamir Ali—in an article on Mid-day, but there is no further information on them.)

The brothers have composed music for prominent Hindi as well as Marathi movies. In their few years of music direction, the duo has composed hit songs for Murder 2, Blood Money, Aatma, Fruit & Nut, Bird Idol and Hum Hai Raahi Car Ke. They have also composed music for the promo and trailer of Rishi Vohra's novel, Once Upon the Tracks of Mumbai.

== Discography ==
Bollywood Movies

- Fruit and Nut (2009)
- Bird Idol (2010)
- Murder 2 (2011) - 3 songs
- Blood Money (2012)
- Once Upon the Tracks of Mumbai (2012 novel)
- Nasha (2013)
- Aatma (2013)
- Hum Hai Raahi Car Ke (2013)
- Mad About Dance (2014)
- Untitled (2015)
- Love Games (2016)
- Raaz Reboot (2016)

Marathi Movies

- Runh (2015)

TV serials

- Ek Boond Ishq - Title track - Life OK (2013)

== Discography - Songs (partial list) ==
- Aa Zaraa Kareeb Se - Murder 2
- Tera Nasha - Nasha
- Arzoo - Blood Money
- Aaja Nindiya - Aatma - Feel It Around You
- Tonight The Party's Going Mad - Mad About Dance
- Ek Boond Ishq - TV series title track
- Tujhko Bhulana - Murder 2
- Jee Le Zyaada - Aatma - Feel It Around You
- Andhera Hai - Fruit and Nut
- Laila - Nasha
- Woh - Hum Hai Raahi Car Ke
- Ding Dong Ding - Hum Hai Raahi Car Ke
- Dil Jaana - Bird Idol
- Oomph Soniye - Bird Idol
- Khabardar (Boman Irani) - Fruit and Nut
- O Meri Jaan - Raaz Reboot
