= Kaalakaandi =

2018 Indian film by Akshat Verma

- Official poster
- Directed by: Akshat Verma
- Written by: Akshat Verma
- Story by: Akshat Verma
- Produced by: Rohit Khattar; Ashi Dua Sara
- Starring: Saif Ali Khan; Akshay Oberoi; Kunaal Roy Kapur; Deepak Dobriyal; Vijay Raaz; Sobhita Dhulipala; Isha Talwar; Shivam Patil; Amanda Rosario
- Cinematography: Himman Dhamija
- Edited by: Shan Mohammed
- Music by: Sameer Uddin; Shashwat Sachdev
- Production companies: Cinestaan Film Company; Flying Unicorn Entertainment; Immoral Police
- Distributed by: AA Films
- Release date: 12 January 2018
- Running time: 112 minutes
- Country: India
- Languages: Hindi; English

Kaalakaandi (translation: Haywire) is a 2018 Indian Hindi-language black comedy film written and directed by Akshat Verma. The film stars Saif Ali Khan, Akshay Oberoi, Deepak Dobriyal, Isha Talwar and Sobhita Dhulipala. It was released on 12 January 2018.

== Plot ==
Rileen (Saif Ali Khan) receives news of his progressing stomach cancer, which is in the last stage. He is left heartbroken but remains quiet in front of everyone. He decides to live life to the fullest, by smoking and taking LSD from a friend but remains unhappy.

His engaged brother Angad (Akshay Oberoi) is getting ready when he receives a call from his ex-girlfriend, Selina (Amanda Rosario) from a hotel. Angad sets out to meet her along with Rileen under the excuse of a haircut.

In the next story, we see Tara (Sobhita Dhulipala) packing her bags to pursue higher studies in the US, while her boyfriend Zubin (Kunaal Roy Kapur) is trying to convince her to change her plans. Hours before her flight, both of them attend a birthday party, but soon the police raid the place. Tara is nervous as her flight leaves in two hours, but she can't leave as the police have locked the place down. She manages to escape with her friends and Zubin in a car. In the car, Zubin and Tara have a heated argument over Tara kissing a guy. Tara loses control and hits a motorcycle, killing two people. Tara feels guilty but leaves when Zubin and her friends advise her not to go to the police.

Meanwhile, Rileen is hallucinating due to the LSD. He meets a transgender woman Sheila (Nary Singh) and coolly tells her that he wants to see her "Southern Hemisphere", with no touching or feeling, and succeeds in doing so. Rileen becomes happy and decides to fulfill other things on his bucket list.

The next story is of two goons who want to make it big, Mafia (Deepak Dobriyal) and Rahmat (Vijay Raaz). They hatch a plan to extract money from their own boss Raza (Asif Basra) and cook up a story. Meanwhile, during a party, Ustad (Neil Bhoopalam), who has helped Raza, is killed on the road by two motorcycle-borne assailants. Mafia and Rahmat witness the crime.

Angad learns that Selina is just using him and feels guilty about cheating on Neha (Amyra Dastur), his fiancée. Angad meets Neha and talks to her. He learns that Neha is a very nice girl and both of them hug each other and get ready for the wedding.

Mafia's greed pushes him to kill Rahmat, and he takes the entire money. He then shoots himself in the abdomen and tells Raza that someone has robbed their money and killed Rahmat and, in that fight, Mafia too got injured. Raza doesn't believe Mafia and is on the verge of killing Mafia but leaves him. Mafia walks onto the road.

Rileen meets the wedding photographer Rakhi (Isha Talwar) and tells his son too had a birthmark like her on his elbow. Rakhi asks him his name, but he states that "People just meet, tell each other their names and then go away, which is of no use". He also tells her about his growing cancer. Rakhi comforts Rileen and they kiss each other. On being asked "What does he mean to her?", she replies "I don't know!" He happily laughs and tells her his name is Rileen.

Tara checks into the airport while Zubin asks her not to think of the horrific night. Tara feels very guilty and decides to approach the police and file an FIR, but the police dissuade her from doing so as the two guys who were killed in the accident were underworld assassins who killed Ustad. Tara meets Zubin, who had been waiting for her. Learning that he truly loves her, Tara proposes to Zubin and then kisses him.

Rileen marches into the marriage where everyone is dancing mindlessly along with Angad and Neha. Rileen dances along, takes out his gun and fires two shots in the air. One of the bullets strikes Mafia in the head, killing him, while the other hits Rileen's foot, prompting him to scream in pain.

== Cast ==
- Saif Ali Khan as Rileen
- Akshay Oberoi as Angad
- Isha Talwar as Rakhi
- Sobhita Dhulipala as Tara
- Kunaal Roy Kapur as Zubin
- Deepak Dobriyal as Mafia
- Vijay Raaz as Rehmat
- Shivam Patil as Jehangir
- Amanda Rosario as Selina
- Shenaz Treasurywala as Ayesha
- Asif Basra as Raza
- Nary Singh as Sheila
- Amyra Dastur as Neha
- Neil Bhoopalam as Omelette/Ustad
- Bugs Bhargava Krishna as Dr Rajendra

== Soundtrack ==
Kaalakaandi

Soundtrack album by Sameer Uddin and Shashwat Sachdev
- Released: 26 December 2017
- Recorded: 2017
- Studios: Pluginn Studio, Vishal Shekhar Studio, Virasat Studios, 5AM Audio
- Genre: Feature film soundtrack
- Length: 15:37
- Language: Hindi
- Label: Zee Music Company
- Producers: Shashwat Sachdev, Rashi Bagai
External audio
- Kaalakaandi – Full Movie Audio Jukebox on YouTube

Sameer Uddin chronology
Dilwale (2015)	Kaalakaandi (2017)

Shashwat Sachdev chronology
Phillauri (2017)	Kaalakaandi (2017)	Veere Di Wedding (2018)

Singles from Kaalakaandi
- 1. "Swagpur Ka Chaudhary" Released: 23 December 2017

The music of Kaalakaandi is composed by Sameer Uddin and Shashwat Sachdev while lyrics have been penned by Anvita Dutt and Akshay Verma. The first track of the film titled as "Swagpur Ka Chaudhary" which is sung by Akshay Verma was released on 23 December 2017. The music album was released by Zee Music Company on 27 December 2017.

Track listing
No.	Title	Lyrics	Music	Singer(s)	Length
1.	"Swagpur Ka Chaudhary"	Akshay Verma	Sameer Uddin	Akshay Verma	2:34
2.	"Kaala Doreya"	Folk	Sameer Uddin	Neha Bhasin	2:28
3.	"Jive With Me"	Anvita Dutt	Sameer Uddin	Abhishek Nailwal	4:11
4.	"Kaalakaandi"	Anvita Dutt	Shashwat Sachdev	Shashwat Sachdev, Vivek Hariharan, Romy, Arun Kamath	2:27
5.	"Aa Bhi Jaa"	Anvita Dutt	Sameer Uddin	Vishal Dadlani & Abhishek Nailwal	3:57
Total length:					15:37

== Critical reception ==
'Kaalakaandi' received mixed response from critics upon its theatrical release.

Saibal Chatterjee from NDTV gave the movie 3 out of 5 stars stating, "'Kaalakaandi' may not be for all palates, but the film has enough spice for those in the mood for an off-the-beaten-track Bollywood experience".

India TV gave the movie 3 out of 5 stars, stating that the word "Kaalakaandi" is Marathi slang for "when everything goes disastrously wrong" and described the lead character as "outrageously humorous yet utterly sensitive"."

Rediff.com gave the movie 3 out of 5 stars stating, "Saif is a hoot in Kaalakaandi".

Meena Iyer from Daily News and Analysis gave the movie 2.5 out of 5 stars stating, "Saif Ali Khan's 'Kaalakaandi' is worth a try, if you like your cinema experimental and edgy".

Renuka Vyavahare from The Times of India gave the movie 2.5 out of 5 stars stating, "What begins as a promising and edgy thriller soon runs out of gags, gas and gravitas".

Sweta Kaushal from Hindustan Times gave the movie 2 out of 5 stars, praising Saif Ali Khan for his performance, despite the script being half-baked.

According To Firstpost, Saif Ali Khan is funny as hell in 'Kaalakaandi' but the film lacks fizz.
