= Love Games (film) =

- Theatrical release poster
- Directed by: Vikram Bhatt
- Written by: Vikram Bhatt
- Screenplay by: Vikram Bhatt
- Story by: Vikram Bhatt
- Produced by: Mahesh Bhatt; Mukesh Bhatt; Bhushan Kumar
- Starring: Patralekha; Tara Alisha Berry; Gaurav Arora
- Cinematography: Manoj Soni
- Music by: Sangeet Haldipur; Siddharth Haldipur-(Sangeet-Siddharth)
- Production companies: Vishesh Films; T-Series
- Distributed by: AA Films
- Release date: 8 April 2016
- Running time: 114 minutes
- Country: India
- Language: Hindi
- Budget: ₹100 million
- Box office: ₹40.4 million

Love Games (also known as Love Games: Love Dangerously) is a 2016 Indian erotic thriller film directed by Vikram Bhatt and produced by Mukesh Bhatt, Mahesh Bhatt and Bhushan Kumar. The film stars Patralekha, Gaurav Arora and Tara Alisha Berry in the main cast. It was released on 8 April 2016.

== Plot ==
The movie starts with an old man falling off from the balcony of the top floor of a penthouse. He is revealed to be Om Raichand, married to a young lady Ramona. Ramona Raichand (Patralekha) is an edgy and adventurous woman. Thrill and lust are all she wants in life, and Sam (Gaurav Arora) is her boy-toy. Sam is perpetually depressed and resorts to self-harm for temporary relief. He tells his psychiatrist (Rukhsar Rehman) that something was missing in his life, but this void makes him feel no pain emotionally. He also says that he believes love is nothing but an excuse for lust. It is also revealed that his mother had fled with another man despite loving his father and marrying him out of her own choice. Thus, he believes all love stories have a tragic ending.

His friend, Ramona, tells him that he does not believe in love because he has not seen adventures in the way of finding love.

So, the closet couple decides to take their escapades a notch higher by playing Love Games. As per the rules of the game, Ramona and Sam need to find the happiest couple in a page 3 party and then seduce one of them to bed.

First they target a regular couple at a party and Sam wins the challenge by seducing the wife first after sabotaging Ramona's chance to lure the husband to the bed. When Ramona finds this out, she is enraged and almost kills Sam with a gun until he kisses her to relax her. She reveals that she hates it when she loses.

Next they meet a successful criminal lawyer, Gaurav Asthana (Hiten Tejwani), and his surgeon wife, Alisha (Tara Alisha Berry). Alisha notices Sam's suicidal cuts and asks him not to harm himself. She accepts his offer to drop her off at her home but mid-way, she is called by her hospital to report immediately for an emergency. She asks Sam to view the live operation from the viewing gallery to learn what pain looks like. Sam realises his missing piece in life is love and falls for Alisha. He follows her to Goa.The wife's vulnerability against her abusive husband only helps Ramona's plan as she sleeps with Gaurav.

In Goa, Alisha shows Sam the wounds inflicted by Gaurav on her body and tells him not to try to be with her. But eventually she falls for him too. They begin an extra-marital affair. Ramona gets angered to see Sam being with another woman. She offered him to remain in love with Alisha, but he must be present as her boy-toy whenever she desires. Sam rejects this idea. That night, Gaurav pours a drink on Alisha's head in front of an audience in a party. Alisha runs and Sam takes her to their company's guesthouse.

Ramona texts Sam to peep out of the window to know what angered Gaurav, while Alisha is sleeping. She tells him that sent a fake letter to Gaurav that looks like it was written from Alisha to Sam. To save Alisha from the abuse, he tries to be with Ramona whenever she wants to.

One night, when Gaurav is out of the house, Ramona brings Sam to Alisha's house while she is sleeping and proposes another Love games prompt. She asks Sam to sleep with her right on the carpet lying in front of Alisha's bed where she is sleeping. If she gets up, she will feel betrayed by Sam. Sam furiously denies it but agrees when Ramona threatens Alisha's safety. Ramona rapes Sam on the carpet that night.

Next day, Sam tells Alisha everything in her hospital warehouse. She, as revealed by a devasted and intoxicated Sam to Ramona at a concert, asked him to never show his face to her ever again. That night, Alisha looks at a sleeping Gaurav and decides something.

The next day, she arrives at Ramona's house and asks her to play a DVD she brought. It shows that Ramona snuck in the penthouse in a different disguise on the night of Om Raichand's murder, indicating she pushed him of the balcony. Ramona asks her about her intentions. Alisha tells her that she is tired of people using her helplessness all the time. She wanted to kill both Gaurav and Sam. She proposes this as a Love Game to Ramona, where Alisha will have to kill Sam and Ramona must kill Gaurav. Whoever gets caught first will lose, and if both win, then they will pop open a bottle of champagne together. Ramona agrees only when Alisha hands her a recording of the Love Game conversation prior recorded, as an insurance. The two women begin their plan.

Ramona seduced Gaurav to bed and stabs him with an adrenaline injection for a natural death. Meanwhile, Alisha calls Sam to her house. Later that night, a man breaks into Ramona's house and attacks her. It is revealed to be Sam, who had come to know of this Murder plan. He tells Ramona that Alisha did not reveal the plan to her, rather they got into a fight when Alisha attacked him. Amidst the fight, Sam killed Alisha in defence. Devastated, he tries to turn himself in to police and even asks Ramona to kill him. A hysterically amused Ramona calms him down.

As a final Love Game against the police, they decide to pin the blame on a dead Gaurav. When they reach Alisha's house, they find that the police has already been called by the housemaid and the body is being sent to the morgue. Sam wears Gaurav's clothes and steals her body from morgue and buries it in a graveyard along with Ramona. Next, they put Gaurav's corpse into his car and push it into the sea. Gaurav is convicted for Alisha's murder.

Sam and Ramona peacefully resume their Love Games. While Ramona goes to her car to grab a bottle of wine for her new target while assuming that Sam is wooing his wife, she notices a card inside the car. It stated Sam as the CEO of the London branch of his father's company. Realising that Sam is trying to leave her, she runs inside to call him. But as soon as she picks up her phone to dial, Alisha emerges from the shadows and hands her a phone with a video recording, with Sam saying that two lovers can definitely kill their hindrances to be together. Alisha shoots Ramona by saying that she is advantageous right now as she cannot be convicted for her murder as Alisha is dead according to the law.

It is then revealed that Alisha did not care about Sam's Love Games and just wanted to be together with him. They both realised that Ramona and Gaurav would kill both of them one day or other, so they decide to hatch a plot to win.

Alisha took a special drug which paralysed her body for a few hours and she would appear dead to everyone else. After she got buried, her father dug up the grave again to get her out. She gets new passport and identity to go to London. She changes her appearance using wig and contact lenses and sits beside Sam in the flight to London.

The movie ends with Sam and Alisha, now Riya, heading to London to live happily after emerging victorious in the Love Games.

== Cast ==
- Patralekha as Ramona Raichand
- Gaurav Arora as Sameer Saxena (Sam)
- Tara Alisha Berry as Alisha Asthana
- Hiten Tejwani as Gaurav Asthana
- Alisha Farrer as Sonia Kamat
- Rukhsar Rehman as Sameer's psychiatrist

== Marketing ==
The trailer and first poster of the film was released on 2 March 2016. The trailer had over a million views on YouTube in few days.

== Soundtrack ==
Love Games

Film score by Sangeet-Siddharth
- Released: 8 March 2016
- Recorded: 2015
- Genre: Pop
- Length: 26:25
- Label: T-Series
- Producer: Sangeet-Siddharth

The first song titled "Awargi" was released on 5 March 2016 where as the complete soundtrack consisting of seven tracks was released on 8 March 2016 under T-Series. It also had English songs. It was composed by Sangeet-Siddharth and the lyrics were given by Kausar Munir and Vikram Bhatt.

Track listing
No.	Title	Lyrics	Singer(s)	Length
1.	"Awargi"	Kausar Munir	Sangeet Haldipur; Rasika Shekar	04:34
2.	"Love Games"	Kausar Munir	Aanchal Shrivastava	04:22
3.	"Mohabbat"	Kausar Munir	Siddharth Haldipur	03:50
4.	"Nirvana"	Kausar Munir	Mohan Kannan	04:14
5.	"Aye Dil"	Kausar Munir	Sunidhi Chauhan	04:19
6.	"Lock Him Up"	Vikram Bhatt	Sonia Saigal; Ravindra Chary	02:57
7.	"Poison"	Vikram Bhatt	Shon Pinto	02:14
Total length:				26:25

== Release ==
The film was released on 8 April 2016 under the production banner of Vishesh Films and was distributed by T-Series and Yash Raj Films in cinemas across India.

== Reception ==
Professional ratings
Review scores
Source	Rating
DNA India	1/2 stars
Times of India	2.5/5 stars
Zee News	2.5/5 stars
NDTV Movies	1.5/5 stars
The Indian Express	0.5/5 stars

The film mostly gained negative reviews from critics. Mohar Basu of Times of India gave the film 2.5 out of 5. He said: "Vikram Bhatt's Love Games tries to be a tempestuous tale about temptations. But his bright concept is far from being well-fleshed out. There were a bunch of interesting ideas which never intertwine with the narrative." Sarita A Tanwar of DNA India said that "If you love games, stay away. After watching this one, you would not come close to even board games." She rated the film 1 out of 2. Zee News rated the film with 2.5 stars out of 5. Saibal Chatterjee from NDTV Movies said "Love Games is a Vishesh Films offering. So it does not lack surface gloss. But it simply isn't enough to hide its lack of depth. Best avoided" He rated the film with one and a half star out of five. Shubhra Gupta of The Indian Express gave a half star to the film.
