= Siddharth: The Prisoner =

- Theatrical release poster
- Directed by: Pryas Gupta
- Written by: Pryas Gupta; Anadi; Hitesh Kewalya
- Starring: Rajat Kapoor; Sachin Nayak; Pradip Sagar
- Cinematography: Mrinal Desai
- Edited by: Pryas Gupta
- Music by: Sagar Desai
- Production companies: Alliance Media & Entertainment; Moviscorp; PVR Pictures Ltd. Vistaar Religare Film Fund; Walkwater Media Ltd
- Release dates: July 2008 (Cinefan Festival); 27 February 2009
- Running time: 110 minutes
- Country: India
- Languages: Hindi; English

Siddharth: The Prisoner (Hindi: सिद्धार्थ: द प्रिज़्नर) is a 2008 Indian thriller film written and directed by Pryas Gupta starring Rajat Kapoor, Sachin Nayak, Pradip Sagar in lead roles.

== Synopsis ==
Just released from prison, Siddharth Roy (Rajat Kapoor), a once famous writer, completes a new manuscript. He re-engages with the outside world, hoping that the new book will restore his reputation and also reconcile him with his estranged wife, Maya. Fate has other plans for Roy, when his briefcase gets exchanged at a cyber café with a similar briefcase containing a large sum of money. Roy loses the only copy of his new manuscript, while Mohan (Sachin Nayak), the cyber café manager, comes under pressure from mob bosses to recover the lost money. In the midst of growing despair about the lost manuscript, Roy is reconciled with his three-year-old son through a scheming housemaid. Unable to find happiness in the money he has found Roy begins to desire the custody of his son. Meanwhile the pressure mounts on Mohan as he loses his job and is forced to go into hiding from the mob. He must find Roy and money at any cost. Based on the ancient text of the Rig Veda, the film explores the theme of renunciation (of desire) as the true path to enlightenment and freedom.

== Cast ==
- Rajat Kapoor as Siddharth Roy
- Sachin Nayak as Mohan
- Pradip Sagar as Amin Bhai (as Praddip Sagar)
- Pradeep Kabra as Aseem
- Gulab Chand Soni as Krishna
- Radhika as Geeta
- Deepak Dadhwal as Lawyer
- Ramesh Rai as Atul Bhai
- Geeta Panchal as Sarita - The Maid
- Krish Bhatia as Siddharth's Son
- Ava Mukherjee as Maya's Mother / Siddharth's Mother-in-law
- Fareed as Sonu
- Sanjeev Jain as Police Inspector

== Release ==
The film was released on 27 February 2009 worldwide.

=== Reception ===
Upon release film gathered mixed reviews from critics. Nikhat Kazmi of Times of India gave the film a three star rating saying, "A metaphorical film about freedom and desire, the film keeps you engrossed. Firstly, by its explorations on the leitmotif of greed. And secondly, due to Rajat Kapoor's nuanced, almost minimalist act of a man in torment."

Anupama Chopra of NDTV gave a negative review saying, "Gupta doesn’t explain key points in the film: like why Siddharth, an author who almost won the Booker prize, ends up in jail; why his wife wants to divorce him and why he seems so bereft of money, family or even one friend. Siddharth the Prisoner sags under its own subtext."

== Awards and nominations ==
Year	Award	Category	Recipient	Result
2008	Asia Pacific Screen Awards	Jury Grand Prize	Pryas Gupta	Won
2008	Asia Pacific Screen Awards	Best Performance by an Actor	Rajat Kapoor	Nominated
2008	Cinefan - Festival of Asian and Arab Cinema	Indian Competition Award	Best Actor/Rajat Kapoor	Won
