= Raaz: Reboot =

2016 film by Vikram Bhatt

- Theatrical release poster
- Directed by: Vikram Bhatt
- Written by: Vikram Bhatt, Girish Dhamija (dialogues)
- Produced by: Mukesh Bhatt; Mahesh Bhatt; Vishesh Bhatt; Bhushan Kumar; Krishan Kumar
- Starring: Emraan Hashmi; Gaurav Arora; Kriti Kharbanda
- Cinematography: Manoj Soni
- Edited by: Kuldip Mehan
- Music by: Jeet Gannguli; Sangeet Haldipur Siddharth Haldipur-(Sangeet-Siddharth)
- Production companies: Vishesh Films; T-Series Films
- Distributed by: Annapurna Studios (India); Eros Now through Grand Showbiz Media & Entertainment (Overseas)
- Release date: 16 September 2016
- Running time: 128 minutes
- Country: India
- Language: Hindi
- Budget: ₹310 million
- Box office: est. ₹420.7 million

Raaz: Reboot (transl. Secret: Reboot) is a 2016 Indian horror thriller film written and directed by Vikram Bhatt. It features Emraan Hashmi, Gaurav Arora and Kriti Kharbanda in the lead roles. The film is the final instalment in the horror film series, Raaz.

Raaz: Reboot was released worldwide on 16 September 2016. Principal photography commenced in January 2016 in Romania.

== Plot ==
Told in nonlinear format, the story concerns a young married couple. Rehaan and Shaina Khanna move to Romania a few years after their marriage. They had lived and met in Romania, falling in love there before moving away and marrying. When Rehaan got an offer for a new job there, Shaina insisted that he take up the job. Rehaan is reluctant to return to Romania, as he is hiding a secret. In their new house in Romania, Shaina begins experiencing hauntings. Rehaan refuses to believe her and distances himself, upset that she made them move countries, and Shaina becomes lonely.

A month after the hauntings begin, Shaina becomes fully possessed. Rehaan's friend takes him to a blind Indian student, Trilok, who is studying psychometry. Through Trilok, Rehaan and the couple's friends learn that while Shaina was dealing with Rehaan's distance and the hauntings, her ex-boyfriend, Aditya Srivastava, had re-entered her life. He had sought her out after having strange dreams about her being haunted by a demon. He offered to help her since Rehaan wouldn't. Shaina was reluctant at first, since she broke up with Aditya because he used to be abusive and possessive, eventually needing a restraining order against him. As the hauntings get worse though, Shaina seeks Aditya's help and believes that the demon's arrival has something to do with Rehaan's secret. Aditya tells her that Rehaan murdered someone before coming to Romania, shocking Shaina. Feeling increasingly isolated in her marriage, Shaina takes off her mangalasutra and sleeps with Aditya.

In the present with Shaina possessed, Rehaan confesses to his friends and Trilok that he did indeed murder someone: Aditya, who is actually dead. Shaina had never really been seeing Aditya at all, only his ghost. He is the spirit possessing her; he had gained her trust, then was able to fully possess her once she took off her mangalsutra, which had been protecting her.

It's revealed that four years ago, just before the couple's marriage, Aditya had blackmailed Rehaan for insider trading. He was willing to drop the charges if Rehaan broke off his engagement to Shaina so that Aditya could rekindle his relationship with her. Enraged, Rehaan had shoved Aditya, causing him to fall and hit his head. As Aditya died, he vowed vengeance. To save Shaina, Trilok and Rehaan recite the Gajendra moksh stotra. Rehaan uncovers Shaina's missing mangalsutra and is able to use it to banish Aditya's spirit from her body.

The movie ends with Rehaan and Shaina sitting by the lakeside talking about how there was a lot of ice around their house when they had first arrived but now all of the ice has melted, symbolizing the renewed closeness between them.

== Cast ==
- Emraan Hashmi as Aditya Srivastava
- Gaurav Arora as Rehaan (Shaina's Husband)
- Kriti Kharbanda as Shaina Khanna (Nee Iyer) : Rehaan's Wife
- Suzanna Mukherjee as Shreya (Aman's Girlfriend)
- Tara Sharma as a Gipsy Malini
- Hema Malini as Rehaan's mother
- Tom Alter as Mihai (Shaina's Molester)
- Ashwath Bhatt as Trilok
- Vijay Raaz as Aman
- Mink Singh as Nisha Comeo
- Amit Behl as Rehaan's Father

== Production ==
The film was shot in Romania in freezing temperatures. Apart from Sinaia and other locations the shooting also took place in haunted forest Hoia-Baciu (also known as Hoia Forest), which is known for various mysterious stories and UFO sightings.

== Soundtrack ==
Raaz: Reboot

Soundtrack album by Jeet Gannguli, Sangeet-Siddharth
- Released: 19 August 2016
- Recorded: 2016
- Genre: Feature film soundtrack
- Length: 27:33
- Label: T-Series
- Producers: Mukesh Bhatt; Mahesh Bhatt; Vishesh Bhatt; Bhushan Kumar; Krishan Kumar

Jeet Gannguli chronology
Junooniyat (2016)	Raaz: Reboot (2016)	Ishq Junoon (2016)

The film's music is composed by Jeet Gannguli along with the duo Sangeet-Siddharth. The first single from the film, "Sound Of Raaz" was rel016 by T-Series on YouTube. The song, sung by Jubin Nautiyal is a tribute to the tradition of haunting melodies in old horror films. The whole album was released on 19 August 2016.

Track listing
No.	Title	Lyrics	Music	Singer(s)	Length
1.	"Lo Maan Liya"	Kausar Munir	Jeet Gannguli	Arijit Singh	5:00
2.	"Raaz Aankhein Teri"	Rashmi Virag	Jeet Gannguli	Arijit Singh	4:51
3.	"O Meri Jaan"	Kausar Munir	Sangeet-Siddharth	K.K.	4:37
4.	"Yaad Hai Na"	Kausar Munir	Jeet Gannguli	Arijit Singh	4:07
5.	"Hummein Tummein Jo Tha"	Rashmi Virag	Jeet Gannguli	Palak Muchhal & Papon	2:58
6.	"Yaad Hai Na" (Sufi Version)	Kausar Munir	Jeet Gannguli	Jubin Nautiyal	3:43
7.	"The Sound of Raaz"	Rashmi Virag	Jeet Gannguli	Jubin Nautiyal	1:37
Total length:					27:33

== Reception ==
The Times of India gave the film two and a half stars. Asian Age rated the film one star out of five, levying criticism at the complexity of the plot and supernatural themes.

== See also ==
- List of Hindi horror films
