= Shivam Patil =

Indian actor, dancer, activist

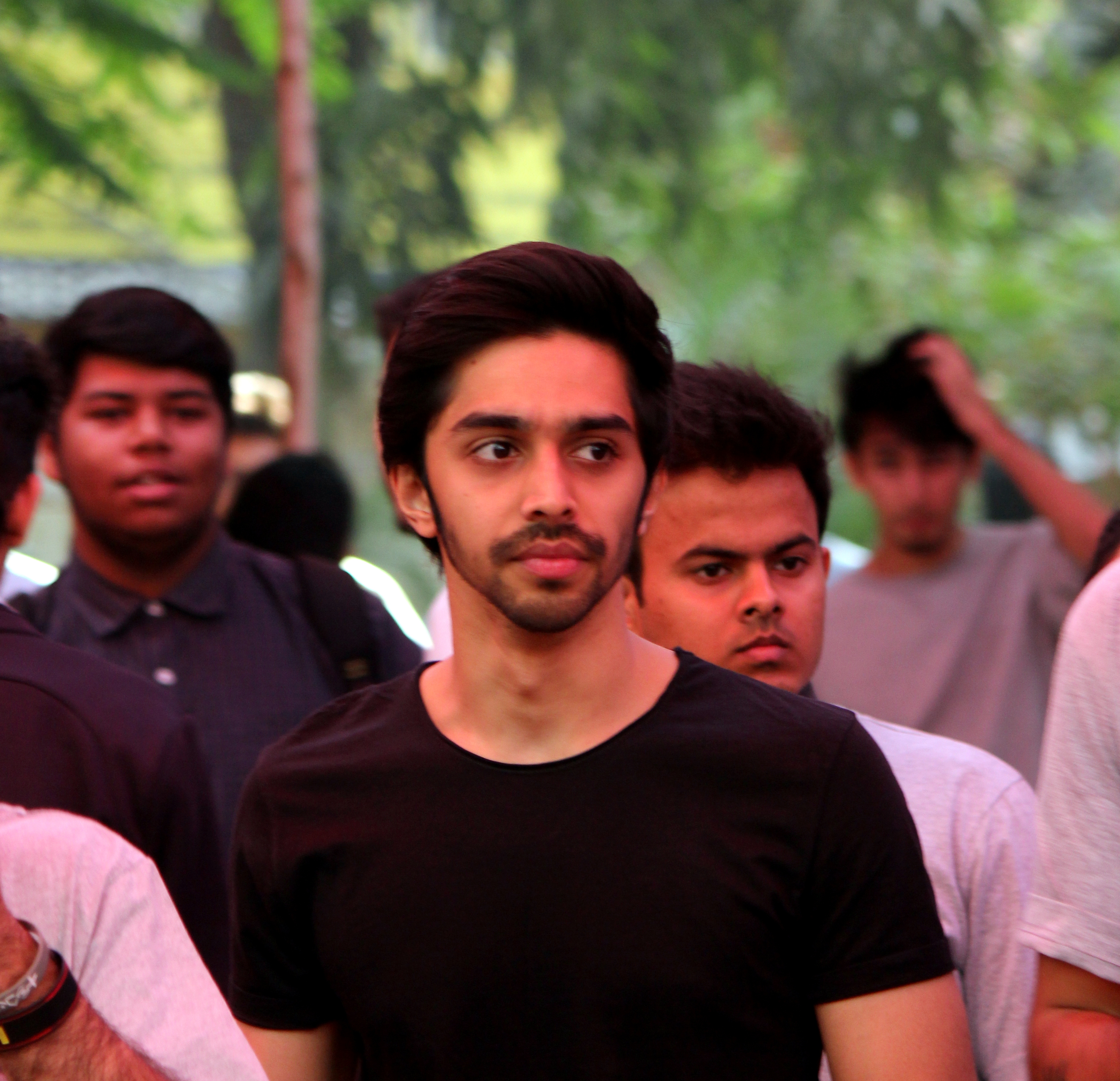
- Born: New Delhi, India
- Occupations: Actor; dancer; activist
- Years active: 2012–present

Shivam Patil is an Indian actor, dancer, and human rights activist. Last seen in SonyLIV's 2024 thriller "36 Days", he made his Bollywood debut in 2013, playing the male lead in Nasha. He subsequently played the lead role of 'Rohan' in Sunny Deol's Ghayal: Once Again in 2016. Patil's next films were Akshat Verma's Kaalakaandi, and the Bollywood remake of the super-hit Telugu film Chatrapathi.

Patil is a domestic violence survivor, and he publicly champions for mental health, the climate crisis, and gender empowerment. He has been an active part of major civilian-led human rights movements in India and Canada, such as the 2020–2021 Indian farmers' protest, where he was present in the 2021 Farmers' Republic Day protest parade in Delhi, and documented videos and pictures from the protests on his social media platform. He also actively amplified stories from the Citizenship Amendment Act protests, where he was present at multiple protest sites including Jamia Millia Islamia, the Shaheen Bagh protest, and he also shot and documented footage during the 2020 Delhi riots, using his social media platform to amplify live stories from the ground during these incidents. In 2020, Shivam played the lead role of Manav in MTV Nishedh, a fictional series created by MTV Staying Alive. He has also appeared in over 50 TV commercials for brands such as Nescafe, Coke, Nokia, Head & Shoulders, Lay's, Parachute, Close-Up, and McDonald's. He has appeared on episodic TV shows such as MTV Webbed, Yeh Hai Aashiqui and MTV Rush.

== Career ==
=== Television ===
Patil was cast in MTV Rush, a thirteen episode fiction show on MTV India based on a fictional college festival called Rush, which was directed by filmmaker Bejoy Nambiar and slated to be aired in 2012.

In 2013, he played the protagonist in the 6th episode of MTV Webbed called "Even Family is Fair Play", where he portrayed the character of a sexually confused teenager.

In 2014, he also played lead roles in two episodes (42nd and 68th) of Yeh Hai Aashiqui.

In 2020, Shivam played the lead role of Manav in MTV Nishedh, a fictional series created by MTV Staying Alive, that deals with stigma around subjects like women's sexual health and illness.

In 2024, he played the character "Bobo" in the audience acclaimed SonyLIV thriller series "36 Days".

He has also appeared in over 50 TV commercials for brands such as Nescafe, Coke, Nokia, Head & Shoulders, Lay's, Parachute, Close-Up, and McDonald's.

=== Bollywood ===
In 2012, Patil was cast as the male lead in Nasha, where he played the role of Saahil, a teenage student who falls in love with his drama teacher Anita played by Poonam Pandey. He was called the "surprise packet of the film" by Taran Adarsh, who noted his ease in front of the camera. Khalid Mohamed, reviewing for the Deccan Chronicle, called his performance in the film "particularly impressive, confident and nuanced, without ever going over the top". Mohamed also stated, "surely, he deserved a better first film". The Mumbai Mirror stated that "Shivam plays it stiff and not terribly expressive. This ultimately works for his character Sahil, and is completely intentional."

Patil had also acted in Sunny Deol's Ghayal Once Again, the sequel to Deol's 1990 film Ghayal. In Ghayal, Patil plays Rohan, a lawyer's son who stands up against injustice. Upon release, Patil's performance in the film was appreciated by critics. Ritika Handoo, reviewing for Zee News, called his performance "a job worthy of mention". Anna MM for the Firstpost said that "Aanchal Munjal and Shivam Patil – Anushka and Rohan here – are worth watching out for" Screenwriter and director Khalid Mohamed called his performance "impressive".

Patil's recent film is Kaalakaandi, which is directed by Akshat Verma, who last wrote Delhi Belly. He plays the character of 'Jehangir Jehangir' as part of the ensemble cast. The movie's release date was 12 January 2018.

He was most recently seen acting in the Bollywood remake of the superhit Telugu film 'Chatrapathi'.

=== Dance ===
Patil was also part of a dance crew called Street Soul Dance Crew, under the nicknames "Evolution" and "Bboy Evolution". He took an acting course under Barry John.

== Activism ==
Patil has been an active and vocal part of major civilian movements in India, as well as international community upliftment efforts in Canada, such as the 2020–2021 Indian farmers' protest, where he was present in the 2021 Farmers' Republic Day protest parade in Delhi, and documented videos and pictures from the protests on his social media platform. He also actively amplified stories from the Citizenship Amendment Act protests, where he was present at multiple protest sites including Jamia Millia Islamia, the Shaheen Bagh protest, and also shot, documented and amplified footage during the 2020 Delhi riots, using his social media platform to amplify live stories from the ground during these incidents. Patil says he began his socio-political activism after the Revocation of the special status of Jammu and Kashmir, the Aarey Forest environmental protests, and the 2019 Jamia Millia Islamia attack which sparked the Citizenship Amendment Act protests. Patil has also been a vocal critic of the Narendra Modi led government for its mishandling of the COVID-19 pandemic in India, claiming that social media influencers did a better job of helping Indian civilians than the Central government did, during the COVID-19 spike in 2021. Patil also criticized the Central government's deflection of responsibility for the COVID-19 crisis, and highlighted the silencing of dissent during the pandemic. He says that he has been stalked, abused, and threatened for being critical of Narendra Modi's governance and policies.

In 2024, Patil was interviewed by Canadian Broadcasting Corporation radio hosts about his experiences providing mental health support on the frontlines to individuals dealing with homelessness and disability in Victoria, British Columbia, Canada.

== Filmography ==
=== Television ===
List of Shivam Patil television credits
Year	Title	Role	No. of Episodes
2012	MTV Rush	Shiva	4
2013	MTV Webbed	Sarthak	1
2014	Yeh Hai Aashiqui	Rahul	1
2014	Yeh Hai Aashiqui	Jeet	1
2020	MTV Nishedh	Manav	13

=== Film ===
List of Shivam Patil film credits
Year	Film	Role	Notes
2013	Nasha	Sahil	
2016	Ghayal Once Again	Rohan Kriplani	
2017	Mumbai Special 6	Mr.Rohan	
2018	Kaalakaandi	Jehangir Jehangir	
2023	Chatrapathi	Ajay	

Key
†	Denotes films that have not yet been released

=== Web series ===
List of Shivam Patil web series credits
Year	Title	Role	Platform	Notes
2019	Bombers	Toto	ZEE5	
2020	MTV Nishedh	Manav	Voot	
2024	36 Days	Baban (Bobo)	SonyLIV	
