= Hum Hai Raahi Car Ke =

- Movie poster
- Directed by: Jyotin Goel
- Produced by: Jyotin Goel
- Starring: Dev Goel; Adah Sharma; Sanjay Dutt; Chunky Pandey; Anupam Kher; Juhi Chawla; Rati Agnihotri; Ganesh Venkatraman; Vivek Vaswani; Ashish Ranglani
- Cinematography: Nitin Sagar
- Music by: Sangeet Haldipur; Siddharth Haldipur-(Sangeet-Siddharth)
- Release date: 24 May 2013
- Running time: 125 min.
- Country: India
- Language: Hindi

Hum Hai Raahi Car Ke (transl. We are the car's travellers) is a romantic comedy adventure film directed by Jyotin Goel that was released in India on 24 May 2013. It marks the debut of Dev Goel as a lead hero son of director Jyotin Goel. It is a remake of 2004 Hollywood comedy film Harold & Kumar Go to White Castle.

== Plot ==
The flim follows two friends who decide to travel from Mumbai to Pune on New Year's night. Their simple road trip quickly spirals into a series of bizarre and comedic misadventures.

== Cast ==
- Dev Goel as Shammi Suri
- Adah Sharma as Sanjana Mehra
- Sanjay Dutt as Police Inspector Karate
- Anupam Kher
- Rati Agnihotri as Shammi's Mother
- Chunky Pandey as Khukhri Thapa/Paaji
- Juhi Chawla as Doctor
- Samrat Mukerji as John

== Soundtrack ==
No.	Title	Singer(s)	Length
1.	"Ding Dang Ding Dang"	Mika Singh
2.	"Nachlay Nachlay"	Shaan, Monali Thakur
3.	"Pri Aur Me"	Clinton Cerejo
4.	"Who"	Sangeet Haldipur
5.	"Hum Hai Raahi Car Ke"	Sangeet Haldipur

== Critical reception ==
Reviews of Hum Hai Raahi Car Ke were poor. in.com gave the film only 1.5 stars out of 5 saying, "giving the name of an old hit a new twist isn't enough to guarantee success."
