= Hotel Beautifool =

Upcoming Indian film

- First official poster
- Directed by: Sameer Iqbal Patel
- Written by: Sameer Iqbal Patel
- Produced by: Mohammed Aslam Shaikh; Madhire Ravinder Reddy
- Starring: Johnny Lever; Brijendra Kala; Rejith Menon; Rohit Khurana; Imam Siddique
- Cinematography: Udaysingh Mohite
- Edited by: Sandeep Singh Bajeli
- Music by: Sanjeev Tiwari; Sameer Iqbal Patel
- Country: India
- Language: Hindi

Hotel Beautifool is an upcoming Bollywood film starring Rejith Menon, Johnny Lever, Brijendra Kala, Imam Siddique. Its director is Sameer Iqbal Patel.

== Development ==
Hotel Beautifool is based on the Hindi play Baat Baat mein Bigdey haalaat, written and directed by Sameer Iqbal Patel. Sameer was planning to make it into a film for some time when Mohammed Aslam Shaikh and Madhire Ravinder Reddy saw the play and decided to join with Patel in making it into a Hindi feature film.

== Filming ==
The first schedule of the film started at Mumbai's future studio on 20 July 2014 and completed on 29 July. The second schedule started on 27 September 2014 in Morjim, Goa, and completed on 15 October. The film is due for release in 2017.

In an interview with the press Johnny Lever revealed about his character in the film, who is a sardar and has a problem with red colour which brings about madness and humor in the film.

== Music ==
The theme song of the film was recorded in Kolkatta in Usha Uthup's voice at her recording studio. The title song of Hotel Beautifool was recorded in Shaan's voice. A party song, "mann samunder gehra gehre", was recorded for the film with Bhoomi Trivedi. The remix of "mann samundar" and "mann ka kauwa" was done by DJ Sachin and DJ Harshit Shah

== Cast ==
- Rejith Menon as Akhileshwar Muthulingum
- Brijendra Kala as Pedro Kumar Alias P.K
- Johnny Lever as Harry Singh
- Imam Siddique as Inspector
- Jia Sharma as Mili
- Sagarika Chhetri as Jaanu Lee
- Sandeep Gosh as Toughy
- Subha Rajput as Kamini
- Anuja Walhe as Tanvi
- Manoj Santoshi as D K
- Istiyak Khan as Sharpshooter Romeo
- Rohit Khurana as Nawab
- pinkoo chaube as Nawab2
