= H. R. Shah =

Indian-American entrepreneur and media personality

- Born: Bahadarpur, Gujarat, India
- Occupations: Entrepreneur, media personality
- Known for: Chairman and CEO of TV Asia
- Awards: Padma Shri (2017)

H. R. Shah, also known as Hasmukh Shah, is an Indian American entrepreneur and media personality. He is the Chairman and CEO of TV Asia and the Chairman of Bharatiya Vidya Bhavan (USA). He was awarded the Padma Shri, India's fourth highest civilian honour, in 2017 in the field of literature and education.

Shah was born in Bahadarpur village of Gujarat state of India and later immigrated to the United States in 1971 where he's been residing since.

Shah received the Padma Shri in 2017, recognizing his efforts in media and education that have fostered closer ties between India and the United States and promoted Indian culture and heritage abroad. He is also a recipient of the 2005 Ellis Island Medal of Honor, an award for immigrants who have made significant contributions to the United States.
