= Aatma (2013 film) =

- Theatrical release poster
- Directed by: Suparn Verma
- Written by: Suparn Verma
- Produced by: Kumar Mangat Pathak; Abhishek Pathak
- Starring: Bipasha Basu; Nawazuddin Siddiqui
- Cinematography: Sophie Winqvist
- Edited by: Hemal Kothari
- Music by: Sangeet-Siddharth
- Production company: Wide Frame Pictures
- Distributed by: Wide Frame Pictures
- Release date: 22 March 2013
- Running time: 94 minutes
- Country: India
- Language: Hindi
- Budget: ₹80 million (US$830,000)
- Box office: ₹87.8 million (US$910,000)

Aatma is a 2013 Indian Hindi-language psychological horror film directed by Suparn Verma and starring Bipasha Basu and Nawazuddin Siddiqui in lead roles and Shernaz Patel and Doyel Dhawan in supporting roles. Aatma released on 22 March 2013 and centers on a mother who must fight to keep her daughter safe from the ghost of her husband.

== Plot ==
Nia Mehra (Doyel Dhawan) is the daughter of Maya Verma (Bipasha Basu) and Abhay Mehra (Nawazuddin Siddiqui), who are divorced. Maya and Nia live with Maya's parents (Shiv Subramaniam) and (Shernaz Patel). Nia is unaware of the fact that her father is dead. Maya deliberately hides the truth from her as Nia is a sensitive child and adores her father. Things start getting bizarre when Paras, Nia's classmate who bullies her in the classroom, ends up dead. Soon after, Nia's teacher, Mrs. Sinha, who complains about Nia, is also found dead. Moreover, Nia often starts talking to her dead father.

Concerned about the absurd change in Nia's behavior, Maya takes her for counselling. It is revealed that Maya was forced into an arranged marriage with Abhay who was a hot-tempered man. He lost his job and friends because of his frequent violent bouts of anger and also suspected Maya of having an affair with her colleague, Pankaj. However, Abhay loved his daughter more than anything else. After Abhay continuously starts beating up Maya daily, she files for divorce and gets the sole custody of Nia. Abhay cannot bear this and threatens Maya that he will take Nia away from her. Shortly after the hearing and the pronouncement of the family court, Abhay dies in a car accident. After the session, the counsellor (Mohan Kapoor) advises Maya to take Nia out for the weekend. The mother-daughter duo do so, but Abhay possesses Nia and again beats up Maya and threatens her that he will take their daughter away with him.

Maya consults a priest (Darshan Jariwala), who tells Maya that as long as she and her daughter share a strong bond of love, Abhay won't be able to kill either of them. After the counsellor tries to convince Nia that her father is dead, the counsellor himself is found dead. Later, Abhay kills Maya's friend Aakanskha for which Maya is framed and arrested. She is admitted in a mental health facility centre in confinement for treatment. Maya's mother calls the priest home to get the home blessed from the evil spirit. Abhay kills the priest and Maya's mother too. Maya, in a desperate bid to save her daughter, kills herself in the health centre confinement, as she remembers the priest's words that no mortal can fight a spirit. Maya becomes a spirit and saves Nia just as Abhay is about to kill her by pushing her before a fast-moving local train. Abhay beats her again and tries to take Nia, but Maya destroys Abhay's spirit, thus ensuring Nia's safety for the rest of her life.

In an epilogue, Nia is shown celebrating her 18th birthday while Maya's spirit fondly watches her.

== Cast ==
- Bipasha Basu as Maya Verma Mehra, Abhay's widow
- Nawazuddin Siddiqui as Abhay Mehra, Maya's husband
- Doyel Dhawan as Nia Mehra, Maya and Abhay's daughter
- Shernaz Patel as Ila Verma, Maya's mother
- Jaideep Ahlawat as Inspector Raza
- Tillotama Shome as Vaishali Sinha
- Darshan Jariwala as Sharmaji, a priest
- Shivkumar Subramaniam as Pratap Verma, Maya's father
- Mohan Kapoor as Dr. Deepak Bhandare, Counsellor
- Geetika Tyagi as Aakanksha
- Padam Bhola as Pankaj
- Lila Adib as old lady
- Rajeev Kumar as Sub-Inspector Naik
- Charu Shankar as Gita
- Sumeet as Satish
- Sharad as Rohit
- Subhash Khadke as Maya's lawyer
- Arvind Wahi as Judge
- Faizan as Paras
- Rakesh Vidua as Principal
- Maanta Dewan as 18 year old Nia
- Chirag as 18 year old Rahul, Nia's friend

== Production ==
Verma first announced plans to direct Aatma in 2012, with a July 2012 announcement confirming that Bipasha Basu would be performing in the film. Shortly after, it was also confirmed that Nawazuddin Siddiqui would be joining her in the film, marking the first time the two actors worked together. Basu has stated that she would "be a fool" to not star in the movie, with Siddiqui remarking that their pairing in the film was "an unusual pairing perhaps because Bipasha is taller, but we shared a beautiful chemistry. Siddiqui further commented that the film is a psychological thriller rather than a horror film, with Basu remarking that the film was "a strong human drama about a mother's maternal instinct and a father's attachment to his child".The film received a "A" certificate from the Censor Board of India.

Marketing material for Aatma was released in February 2013, with the official trailer releasing on 11 February 2013. The promo of the film was also aired during the 6th Filmsaaz award ceremony held on 3 March 2013.

== Critical reception ==
Critical reception for Aatma has been mixed, with a reviewer for Rediff.com criticizing the film for lacking a "sense of mystery, the element of surprise that's essential for films in this genre". NDTV praised the film's acting, particularly that of Doyel Dhawan and especially of Bipasha's deep role, but also commented that they felt the film wasn't particularly frightening. In contrast, India TV stated that the movie's "thrilling parts" "succeeded in frightening [them]", although they found the ending anticlimactic. Yahoo Movies Review stated, "The film’s linear narrative follows a very predictable plot trajectory that hardly delivers on the thrill quotient" and gave the movie a 2 star rating. Filmfare stated This is one of Bipasha's better performances. She emotes well even in the really tough scenes where she is being abused.

== Awards ==
Award	Category	Recipients	Result
South African Horror Fest	Scariest Performer of the Year	Bipasha Basu	Won
