= Fruit and Nut (film) =

- Directed by: Kunal Vijaykar
- Written by: Kunal Vijaykar; Sharat Katariya
- Produced by: Ajit Andhare
- Starring: Boman Irani; Cyrus Broacha; Dia Mirza; Mahesh Manjrekar; Sachin Nayak
- Cinematography: Attar Singh Saini
- Edited by: Harshal Thakur
- Music by: Sangeet Haldipur; Siddharth Haldipur-(Sangeet-Siddharth)
- Distributed by: Viacom18 Studios
- Release date: 23 October 2009
- Country: India
- Language: Hindi
- Budget: ₹5 crore
- Box office: ₹15 lakh

Fruit and Nut is a 2009 Indian comedy film directed by comedian Kunal Vijaykar starring Boman Irani, Cyrus Broacha, Dia Mirza and Mahesh Manjrekar. The film was produced and distributed by Viacom 18 Motion Pictures, and was released on 23 October 2009.

== Synopsis ==
Monica Gokhale (Dia Mirza) works for the Bombay Heritage Society under Khandar Zala (Mahesh Manjrekar). Her plans of revamping the city's old buildings go against Maharaja Harry Holkar (Boman Irani). To stop Gokhale, Holkar has her kidnapped. However, she is rescued by Jolly Maker (Cyrus Broacha), an innocent and not-so-smart person. This not only brings fame to Maker but also makes Holkar join hands with Zala to bomb the Secretariat building and recruit scientist Vishwas Atmavishwas Pinakin (Rajit Kapoor) for the same. Realizing their plan, Gokhale reveals her true identity and joins hands with Maker to stop the crooks from destroying the city.

== Cast ==
- Boman Irani as Harry Holkar
- Cyrus Broacha as Jolly Maker
- Dia Mirza as Monica 'Monu' M. Gokhale
- Mahesh Manjrekar as Khandar Zala
- Atmaram Bhende as Peter
- Rajit Kapoor as Vishwas Atmavishwas Pinakin (credited as Rajit Kapur)
- Vijay Patkar as Clint
- Surendra Rajan as Dhotilal (Holkar's associate)
- Kishore Nadlaskar as Motilal (Holkar's associate)
- Suhas Khandke as Mayor (credited as Suhas Khadke)
- Anisha Hinduja as Suman (a terrorist hired from Dubai)
- Sachin Nayak as Anna (a beggar and undercover RAW agent)
- Bachan Pachera as Sulaiman (a terrorist hired from Dubai)
- Anil Mahtrey as Inspector Chaugle (credited as Anil Mhatre)
- Bhuvnesh Shetty as office peon (credited as Bhuvanesh Shetty)

== Release ==
=== Critical reception ===
The film received very negative reviews from critics. Most dismissed the film as "slapstick". Taran Adarsh of IndiaFM rated the film as 1.5 stars out of 5, and said, "Director Kunal Vijaykar tries hard to keep you entertained, but the writing is just not captivating. Sure, you do laugh at a few jokes/situations, but there are times when the jokes aren’t too funny and also tend to get repetitive." Anupama Chopra of NDTV gave the film 1.5 stars out of 5, and stated, "Vijaykar and his actors are straining too hard to make you laugh at jokes that are simply too flimsy for film. It’s exhausting more than entertaining. See it if you must." Nikhat Kazmi of The Times of India gave the film 1.5 stars out of 5, and said, "Neither fruity nor nutty, this film ends up as a total squish. After an unfruitful watch, you feel completely let down." Kaveri Bamzai of India Today Group gave the film 1 star out of 5, and said, "Unfortunately, the writers seem to have exhausted themselves thinking of the funny names and the interesting premise. There is nothing beyond it, except for two senseless item songs, one each for Irani and Mirza to stretch their legs." Rajeev Masand of CNN-IBN gave the film 1.5 stars out of 5, and stated, "Despite juvenile jokes like peeing on open electric wires, Fruit & Nut is mercifully not the sort of vulgar comedy we’ve got used to seeing at the cinemas these days."
