= A Band of Boys =

Indian pop band

- Origin: India
- Genres: Pop
- Years active: 2001–2006; 2018–present
- Labels: Musicurry; Times Music; Universal Music India; White Hill Beats
- Members: Karan Oberoi; Sherrin Varghese; Chintuu Bhosle; Sudhanshu Pandey; Danny Fernandes
- Past members: Siddharth Haldipur

A Band of Boys (also known as ABOB) is an Indian Hindi boy band. The band was formed in 2001, and the original line up consisted of Karan Oberoi, Siddharth Haldipur, Sherrin Varghese, Chintoo Bhosle and Sudhanshu Pandey; Pandey and Haldipur eventually left the group.

In 2018, a new member, Danny Fernandes, was added to the band. In 2024, Pandey rejoined the group.

== History ==
A Band of Boys was formed in 2001, after auditions which had 1200 entries, judged by Hariharan, Lesle Lewis, Vinod Nair and Manu Kumaaran. The band made their debut with album Yeh Bhi Woh Bhi featuring the number Meri neend. The band did a movie titled Kiss Kisko in 2004.

Inspired by The Backstreet Boys, Boyzone and NSYNC, the band achieved notable success with hits like "Gori," "Meri Neend," and "Ishq," and collaborated with Asha Bhosle for "Dil Sarphira," before working on the film "Kiss Kisko" in 2004.

== Members ==
- Karan Oberoi (2001–present)
- Sherrin Varghese (2001–present)
- Chintuu Bhosle (2001–present)
- Sudhanshu Pandey (2001– 2005, 2024–present)
- Siddharth Haldipur (2001–2006)
- Danny Fernandes (2018–present)

== Discography ==
Album – Yeh Bhi Woh Bhi (2002):

- Meri Neend
- Gori
- Tera Chehra
- Ishq
- Thirchi Nazar
- She Drives Me Crazy
- Elements (Aayi Ho Jabse)

Single - Ghanta! The bell (2002)

Album – Kis Kis Ko (2004):

- A Saman Gayi Meri Dhadkan mein
- Dhun tunak dhun
- Ho Jaye
- Hum aur tum
- Jo dil Chahe
- Kaisa hain yeh Jaadu
- Mast Kalandar
- Teri Neend

Album – Gaane Bhi Do Yaaro (2006)

- Nain Kataari
- Funkh With You
- Aa Bhi Jaa Ae Mere Humdum
- Sunlo Zaraa
- Jhoomengi Bahaaren
- Aaye Aaye
- Mast Kalandar
- Main Chal Diya

Song – Nain Ladanein (2020)

Album – Band Of Boys Reignite (2024):

- Gori Again
- Nazro se dhoka
- Sochna Kya
- Manwa re
- Le Chaloon

== Filmography ==
- Kiss Kis Ko (2004)
