= Nasha (film) =

2013 Indian film

- Theatrical release poster
- Directed by: Amit Saxena
- Story by: Ajit Rajpal
- Produced by: Surendra Suneja; Aditya Bhatia
- Starring: Shivam Patil; Poonam Pandey; Sheetal Singh; Ranbir Chakma; Nation Chakma; Pranesh Chakma
- Cinematography: James Fowlds
- Music by: Siddharth Haldipur-(Sangeet-Siddharth)
- Distributed by: Eagle Home Entertainment; Online Cinema
- Release date: 26 July 2013
- Country: India
- Language: Hindi
- Box office: ₹80 million (US$830,000)

Nasha (transl. Intoxication) is a 2013 Indian teen erotic film directed by Amit Saxena. The film is the Bollywood debut of Shivam Patil and Poonam Pandey. Upon release, Nasha gained a negative critical response. It cost approximately ₹40 million (US$420,000) to make and grossed a little over ₹80 million (US$830,000) at the box office. The movie was controversial because of alleged inappropriate content, sexuality, and nudity.

== Plot ==
The film is set in Panchgani, a hill station in India, and follows a boy named Saahil (Shivam Patil) and his friends who pull pranks on the students at their school by taking off their pants and exposing nudes to make girls surprised in front of them. The students are punished later that day. Saahil has a girlfriend called Tia. During the summer break, he and his friends are introduced to Anita (Poonam Pandey), who is the new drama teacher. She decides to make them perform a play. All the boys in the group fall for her beauty and persona. But it's Saahil who gets the most intrigued by her. Slowly, he realises he cannot think of anything but her. As rehearsals of the play go on, he innocently starts to fantasise about having fun with her.

One day while rehearsing for the play, Anita's boyfriend Samuel turns up at home and surprises her. Anita and Sam are a happy couple, which makes Saahil envious and unhappy. Later one night, while returning from a movie, seeing Sam and Anita cuddle in the car makes him uncomfortable, and he tells Sam to stop the car and walks back home. Sam seeing Saahil's emotions tells Anita that Saahil loves her, which Anita laughs over. Over the next few days, Sam, to prove his point, starts teasing Saahil, which makes Saahil angry, and one day, while having a race, Sam purposefully pushes Saahil, who gets hurt. Anita scolds Sam for behaving like a child. Saahil's friends, now realising that Saahil has feelings for Anita, start teasing him by passing comments about Anita and Sam. Saahil gets offended when he hears them say that Sam and Anita are having sex every night and gets into a brawl with his friend. Angry and suspicious, he goes to Anita's home in the night and enters the house through the window. He's shocked to see Anita and Sam having sex. Heartbroken, he is about to leave when he accidentally pushes a table, which makes a noise. Anita comes out to check and is shocked seeing Saahil. The next morning, Saahil comes to Anita's house for the rehearsal. But Anita, extremely furious with him for what he did last night, scolds him and tells him to get out of the play. Because of this incident, Tia also has a very emotional breakup with Saahil.

A few days later, Anita gets a phone call from the police station. There she learns that Sam had taken one of her students (who is also Saahil's friend) to a rave party. Police had conducted a raid where she was caught, and Sam somehow escaped. On arriving back home, Anita confronts Sam, in which they end up having a fight, and Sam, being drunk, slaps Anita and leaves her. Saahil learns about the fight and goes to meet her the next morning. Both reconcile. In the evening, he takes some home-made biryani to Anita's place to make her feel better, only to find Sam there, talking to Anita. He is again hurt and leaves. Anita sees him going. The next day, Anita goes to Saahil's place and meets his uncle and father. Upon seeing Saahil as he comes out to check who has come, she apologises to him and takes him out for a cup of coffee. Here, she tells him that things are finally over between her and Samuel, which turns Saahil's mood around.

A few days later, Anita and Saahil's friends come to his house to celebrate Saahil's birthday. After the party, he goes to her house with a wine bottle. They celebrate together, drink, and happen to kiss. But Anita realising her mistake, stops him and asks him to leave. Anita now knows that she has begun to love Saahil, who is heartbroken upon being literally thrown out of the house. Later, Saahil's uncle and father meet Anita to ask her what the matter with Saahil is, and Anita simply assures them that things will be back to normal in a few days. Anita then resigns from her job at school and informs Saahil. Saahil reaches her house in a desperate attempt to stop her, where a highly emotional showdown takes place between them, and they finally make love. She also confesses her love for him.

Later, after Anita leaves Panchgani, Saahil reads her letter to him stating that they have to part ways as what happened between them is not right. And in the future, if they're meant to meet again, they would meet in another time and place, as different individuals. She tells him to forget her. Saahil breaks down with a sense of finality as he finishes reading the letter. Later, he goes to meet his friends, where he reconciles with all of them, including Tia, as he looks back at this entire experience of his with a new, mature perspective.

== Cast ==
- Poonam Pandey as Anita
- Shivam Patil as Saahil
- Vishal Bhonsle as Samuel "Sam"
- Mohit Chauhan as Saahil's uncle
- Ranbir Chakma as Tenzin
- Nation Chakma as Entertainer
- Pranesh Chakma as Kabir
- Sheetal Singh as Tia
- Rohan Khurana as Sunny
- Chirag Lobo as Saahil's friend

== Soundtrack ==
Nasha

Studio album by Sangeet-Siddharth
- Genre: Feature film soundtrack
- Length: 25:03
- Label: Saregama

No.	Song	Artist	Length
1	"Tera Nasha"	Anirudh	06:11
2	"Laila"	Monali Thakur	04:11
3	"Besharam"	Shaan, Anusha Mani	04:14
4	"Goti Song"	Akshay Deodhar, Prakriti Kakkar, Sukriti Kakkar	02:55
5	"Laila" (Unplugged)	Sangeet Haldipur, Siddharth Haldipur	03:40
6	"Nasha" (The Addictive Mix)	Sangeet Haldipur	03:50

== Promotion ==
The posters from the film angered few people of Mahim area in Mumbai. A group of protesters tore the posters and set them on fire on 20 July 2013. The general secretary of Shiv Sena Chitrapat has objected to Pandey's skin showing in the advertisements, saying, "We find the poster highly vulgar and derogatory and won't allow such hoardings."

== Reception ==
=== Critical response ===
Nasha received largely negative critical response, with Dnaindia gave 2 out of 5 rating. BollywoodLife also rated it 2 out of 5 star. MumbaiMirror gave 2 out of 5 stars and stated that "Nasha unselfishly makes an attempt to stay away from unnecessary sex and tell a story, but ultimately, like school in summer, it's not got class." However, Rediff.com stated as "Nasha gives you a nice hangover" giving 3 out of 5 stars.

=== Box office ===
Film had opened with around 3.5–40 million net in the opening weekend. After the weekend, the film made around 75 million by the sixth day.
