= Sameer Iqbal Patel =

Indian film director

Sammir I Patel
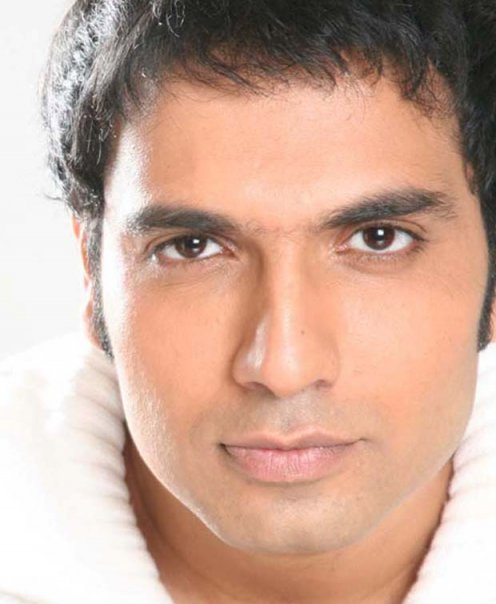
- Born: 19 October 1979 (age 46); Jambusar, Gujarat, India
- Occupations: Actor, writer, director

Sameer Iqbal Patel, also referred to as Sammir I Patel and Sameer Patel, is a film director, producer, writer, actor and former model from India. Patel started his career as a model. He has appeared on TV shows and has written and directed a dozen commercial plays.

Patel's hit play, Hindi comedy Baat Baat Mein Bigdey Haalat featured Rakesh Bedi and Chetanya Adib. His directorial debut was for the 2017 film Hotel Beautifool, adapted from that play.

As an actor, he featured in national television shows including Ehsaas, Mr. Aur Mrs. Verma Ki Rasoi and the Noor Jehan television show. He is the writer of the television show Yeh Chanda Kanoon Hai, which airs on SAB TV. Sammir has written and developed many tv shows.

== Early life ==
Patel was born on 19 October in Jambusar, Gujarat to Sharifa Patel and Iqbal Patel. He attended St. Peter's School, Panchgani and Indian Embassy high school, Jeddah.

== Career ==
Patel with Johny lever at the completion shoot of Hotel Beautifool press conference

Patel started his career modelling for brands and products including ICICI, HDFC, Panama, Vicks Super Balm, and Aristocrat Luggage. He went on to do TV shows and theater. Later he formed his own theater group. He has written and directed a dozen commercial plays including Jo khaya so pachchtaye, hawa hawai, 3 flights down, and baat baat mein bigdey haalaat. Subsequently, he got into TV and film writing.Sammir has written and developed many hot tv shows, Bhabhiji ghar pe hai was developed by Patel and Manoj Santoshi for & tv. He directed the Hindi comedy film Hotel Beautifool. Patel has started working on his next project, the Hindi feature film Tata Goodbye, a black comedy.

SIP Digital is a digital channel started by Patel. Its first video on breast cancer was released on YouTube on 2 December 2016. “This is our first video on our channel and I wanted it to be impactful. So, ‘All The Breast’ seemed like the right way to start. Our channel will be showing variety of content whether it is on social awareness or entertainment", Patel said in a statement. He added: “SIP digital is also a platform which will be open for aspiring filmmakers to showcase their content". SIP Digital's show Jhappi Jet, a comic web series set in the cockpit of an airplane, was launched in January 2017, and the first episode was released on 1 February 2017. Pfa: Love mom & dad, a short film in Hindi was written, directed and produced by Patel. The film got recognition worldwide by winning many awards in several international film festivals. Yours truly Roohani, a 42-minutes romantic comedy web film written, directed and produced by Patel was released on 7 March 2018, starring Veebha Anand and Rishi Saxena. The film was shot in one day with a five-camera set up. At present Patel has a feature film named Pink Vodka under production and an Indo Canadian web series named Canada Diaries.

== Filmography ==
Film
Year	Title	Director	Writer	Notes	Ref.
2017	Pfa love mom & Dad	Yes	Yes	Short	
2017	Hotel Beautifool	Yes	Yes	Feature Film	
2018	Yours Truly Roohani (web film)	Yes	Yes	Web film	
2021	Canada Diaries (web series)	Yes	Yes	Web series	
2023	Milenge Jannat mein (festival film)	Yes	Yes	Web film	
