= List of accolades received by Hum Tum (film) =

Hum Tum awards and nominations
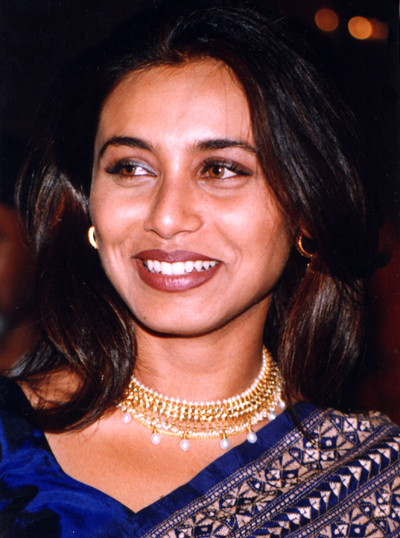
- Rani Mukerji garnered several accolades for her performance in Hum Tum.
Awards and nominations
Award	Wins	Nominations
Bollywood Movie Awards	1	6
Filmfare Awards	5	8
Global Indian Film Awards	2	13
International Indian Film Academy Awards	1	5
National Film Awards	1	1
Screen Awards	4	12
Stardust Awards	2	5
Zee Cine Awards	2	12

Totals (Note: Certain award groups do not simply award one winner. They acknowledge several different recipients, have runners-up, and have third place. Since this is a specific recognition and is different from losing an award, runner-up mentions are considered wins in this award tally. For simplification and to avoid errors, each award in this list has been presumed to have had a prior nomination.)
- Wins: 18
- Nominations: 62

Hum Tum (transl. Me and You) is a 2004 Indian Hindi-language romantic comedy film written and directed by Kunal Kohli. Produced by Aditya Chopra under his banner Yash Raj Films, the film stars Saif Ali Khan and Rani Mukerji, with Rishi Kapoor, Kirron Kher, Jimmy Shergill and Abhishek Bachchan. Hum Tum follows the encounters of Karan and Rhea, who run into each other on several occasions under various circumstances. The film marked Mukerji's third film with Yash Raj Films.

The film has several short animation sequences, which were created by Kathaa Animations headed by Prakash Nambiar, with special effects done by Tata Elxsi. The cinematography is done by Sunil Patel. Jatin–Lalit composed the music, while lyrics were written by Prasoon Joshi. The film was a success at the box office, with a gross of ₹432.2 million (US$4.5 million). It became the sixth highest-grossing film of the year.

The film received several accolades. At the 52nd National Film Awards in 2005, Khan was awarded the National Film Award for Best Actor. At the 50th Filmfare Awards, Hum Tum received 8 nominations and won 5 awards, including Best Director (Kohli), Best Actress (Mukherji), Best Comedian (Khan), Best Female Playback Singer (Alka Yagnik for "Hum Tum"), and Best Scene of the Year. At the 6th IIFA Awards, Hum Tum received 5 nominations and won Best Actress (Mukherji). Hum Tum also earned two Global Indian Film Awards, four Screen Awards, two Stardust Awards, and two Zee Cine Awards.

== Awards and nominations ==
List of accolades received by Hum Tum
Award	Date of ceremony (Note: Date is linked to the article about the awards held that year, wherever possible.)	Category	Recipient(s)	Result	Ref(s)
Anandalok Puraskar Awards	2005	Best Actress (Hindi)	Rani Mukerji	Won	
Bollywood Movie Awards	30 April 2005	Best Film	Hum Tum	Nominated	
Bollywood Movie Awards	30 April 2005	Best Director	Kunal Kohli	Nominated	
Bollywood Movie Awards	30 April 2005	Best Actress	Rani Mukerji	Won	
Bollywood Movie Awards	30 April 2005	Best Supporting Actress	Kirron Kher	Nominated	
Bollywood Movie Awards	30 April 2005	Best Comedian	Kirron Kher	Nominated	
Bollywood Movie Awards	30 April 2005	Best Comedian	Saif Ali Khan	Nominated	
Bollywood Movie Awards	30 April 2005	Best Screenplay	Kunal Kohli, Siddharth Anand	Won	
Filmfare Awards	26 May 2005	Best Film	Hum Tum	Nominated	
Filmfare Awards	26 May 2005	Best Director	Kunal Kohli	Won	
Filmfare Awards	26 May 2005	Best Actor	Saif Ali Khan	Nominated	
Filmfare Awards	26 May 2005	Best Actress	Rani Mukerji	Won	
Filmfare Awards	26 May 2005	Best Performance in a Comic Role	Saif Ali Khan	Won	
Filmfare Awards	26 May 2005	Best Music Director	Jatin–Lalit	Nominated	
Filmfare Awards	26 May 2005	Best Female Playback Singer	Alka Yagnik for "Hum Tum"	Won	
Filmfare Awards	26 May 2005	Best Scene of the Year	Late night snack scene	Won	
Global Indian Film Awards	25 January 2005	Best Film	Hum Tum	Nominated	
Global Indian Film Awards	25 January 2005	Best Producer	Aditya Chopra	Nominated	
Global Indian Film Awards	25 January 2005	Best Director	Kunal Kohli	Nominated	
Global Indian Film Awards	25 January 2005	Best Story	Kunal Kohli	Nominated	
Global Indian Film Awards	25 January 2005	Best Actor	Saif Ali Khan	Nominated	
Global Indian Film Awards	25 January 2005	Best Actress	Rani Mukerji	Won	
Global Indian Film Awards	25 January 2005	Best Actor in a Comedy Role	Kirron Kher	Nominated	
Global Indian Film Awards	25 January 2005	Best Music	Jatin-Lalit	Nominated	
Global Indian Film Awards	25 January 2005	Best Editing	Ritesh Soni	Nominated	
Global Indian Film Awards	25 January 2005	Best Cinematography	Sunil Patel	Nominated	
Global Indian Film Awards	25 January 2005	Best Screenplay	Kunal Kohli, Siddharth Anand	Nominated	
Global Indian Film Awards	25 January 2005	Best Art Direction	Sharmista Roy	Nominated	
Global Indian Film Awards	25 January 2005	Best Dialogue	Kunal Kohli	Won	
International Indian Film Academy Awards	11 June 2005	Best Film	Hum Tum	Nominated	
International Indian Film Academy Awards	11 June 2005	Best Director	Kunal Kohli	Nominated	
International Indian Film Academy Awards	11 June 2005	Best Actor	Saif Ali Khan	Nominated	
International Indian Film Academy Awards	11 June 2005	Best Actress	Rani Mukerji	Won	
International Indian Film Academy Awards	11 June 2005	Best Female Playback Singer	Alka Yagnik for "Hum Tum"	Nominated	
National Film Awards	21 October 2005	Best Actor	Saif Ali Khan	Won	
Producers Guild Film Awards	21 January 2006	Best Director	Kunal Kohli	Nominated	
Producers Guild Film Awards	21 January 2006	Best Actress in a Leading Role	Rani Mukerji	Nominated	
Producers Guild Film Awards	21 January 2006	Best Actress in a Supporting Role	Kirron Kher	Nominated	
Producers Guild Film Awards	21 January 2006	Best Screenplay	Kunal Kohli, Siddharth Anand	Nominated	
Producers Guild Film Awards	21 January 2006	Best Female Playback Singer	Alka Yagnik for "Hum Tum"	Nominated	
Screen Awards	18 January 2005	Best Film	Hum Tum	Nominated	
Screen Awards	18 January 2005	Best Director	Kunal Kohli	Won	
Screen Awards	18 January 2005	Best Actor	Saif Ali Khan	Nominated	
Screen Awards	18 January 2005	Best Actress	Rani Mukerji	Won	
Screen Awards	18 January 2005	Best Supporting Actress	Kirron Kher	Nominated	
Screen Awards	18 January 2005	Best Music Director	Jatin-Lalit	Nominated	
Screen Awards	18 January 2005	Best Male Playback	Babul Supriyo for "Hum Tum"	Nominated	
Screen Awards	18 January 2005	Best Female Playback	Alka Yagnik for "Hum Tum"	Nominated	
Screen Awards	18 January 2005	Best Lyricist	Prasoon Joshi for "Hum Tum"	Won	
Screen Awards	18 January 2005	Best Screenplay	Kunal Kohli, Siddharth Anand	Nominated	
Screen Awards	18 January 2005	Best Dialogue	Kunal Kohli	Nominated	
Screen Awards	18 January 2005	Best Special Effects	Tata Elxsi, Pankaj Khandpur and Kathaa Animation	Won	
Stardust Awards	20 February 2005	Star of the Year – Male	Saif Ali Khan	Nominated	
Stardust Awards	20 February 2005	Star of the Year – Female	Rani Mukerji	Nominated	
Stardust Awards	20 February 2005	Best Supporting Actress	Kirron Kher	Won	
Stardust Awards	20 February 2005	Hottest New Director	Kunal Kohli	Won	
Stardust Awards	20 February 2005	Standout Performance by a Lyricist	Prasoon Joshi for "Hum Tum"	Nominated	
Zee Cine Awards	26 March 2005	Best Film	Hum Tum	Nominated	
Zee Cine Awards	26 March 2005	Best Director	Kunal Kohli	Nominated	
Zee Cine Awards	26 March 2005	Best Actor – Female	Rani Mukerji	Won	
Zee Cine Awards	26 March 2005	Best Actor in a Supporting Role – Male	Rishi Kapoor	Nominated	
Zee Cine Awards	26 March 2005	Best Actor in a Comic Role	Kirron Kher	Nominated	
Zee Cine Awards	26 March 2005	Best Actor in a Comic Role	Saif Ali Khan	Nominated	
Zee Cine Awards	26 March 2005	Best Music Director	Jatin-Lalit	Nominated	
Zee Cine Awards	26 March 2005	Best Lyricist	Prasoon Joshi for "Hum Tum"	Nominated	
Zee Cine Awards	26 March 2005	Best Editing	Ritesh Soni	Nominated	
Zee Cine Awards	26 March 2005	Best Screenplay	Kunal Kohli, Siddharth Anand	Nominated	
Zee Cine Awards	26 March 2005	Best Song Recording	Vijay Dayal	Won	
Zee Cine Awards	26 March 2005	Best Publicity Design		Nominated	
