= Mirchi Music Award for Upcoming Female Vocalist of the Year =

Indian music award

The Mirchi Music Award for Upcoming Female Vocalist of The Year is given yearly by Radio Mirchi as a part of its annual Mirchi Music Awards for Hindi films, to recognise a female vocalist who has delivered an outstanding performance in a film song.

== List of winners ==
- 2008 Dominique Cerejo - "Ye Tumhari" from Rock On!!
  - Suzanne D'Mello - "Aaye Bachchu" from Ghajini
  - Anusha Mani - "Lazy Lamhe" from Thoda Pyaar Thoda Magic
  - Shruti Pathak - "Mar Jawaan" from Fashion
  - Anmol Malik - "Talli Ho Gayi" from Ugly Aur Pagli
- 2009 Aditi Singh Sharma - "Yahi Meri Zindagi" from Dev.D
  - K Bhavatharini - "Gumm Summ Gumm" from Paa
  - Marianne D'Cruz Aiman - "Dua" from Kurbaan
  - Pamela Jain - "Diwani Diwani" from Royal Utsav
  - Mauli Dave - "Love Ka Tadka" from Love Ka Tadka
- 2010 Mamta Sharma - "Munni Badnaam" from Dabangg
  - Ritu Pathak & Alyssa Mendonsa - "Papa Jaag Jaayega" from Housefull
  - Sukanya Purayastha - "Kaisi Hai Yeh Udaasi" from Karthik Calling Karthik
  - Antara Mitra - "Bheegi Si Bhaagi Si" from Rajneeti
  - Vibhavari Apte Joshi - "Saiba" from Guzaarish
- 2011 Tia Bajpai - "Sheet Leher" from Lanka
  - Alma Ferovic - "Aur Ho" from Rockstar
  - Mitika Kanwar -"Habibi" from Azaan
  - Shazneen Arethna - "I Hate You (Like I Love You)" from Delhi Belly
  - Ujjaini Mukherjee - "Manu Bhaiya" from Tanu Weds Manu
- 2012 Neeti Mohan - "Jiya Re" from Jab Tak Hai Jaan
  - Shalmali Kholgade & Monali Thakur - "Aga Bai" from Aiyyaa
  - Shalmali Kholgade - "Pareshaan" from Ishaqzaade
  - Suman Sridhar - "Muskaanein Jhoothi Hai" Taalash
  - Priya Panchal - "Piya O Re Piya (Sad)" from Tere Naal Love Ho Gaya
- 2013 Bhoomi Trivedi - "Ram Chahe Leela" from Ram-Leela
  - Palak Muchhal - "Chahun Main Yaa Na" from Aashiqui 2
  - Palak Muchhal - "Meri Aashiqui" from Aashiqui 2
  - Mili Nair - "Meethi Boliyaan" from Kai Po Che!
- 2014 Nooran Sisters - "Patakha Guddi" from Highway
  - Kanika Kapoor - "Baby Doll" from Ragini MMS 2
  - Jasmine Sandlas - "Yaar Naa Miley" from Kick
  - Shraddha Kapoor - "Do Jahaan" from Haider
  - Shraddha Kapoor - "Galliyan (Unplugged)" from Ek Villain
- 2015 Payal Dev - "Ab Tohe Jane Na Doongi" from Bajirao Mastani
  - Swati Sharma - "Banno" from Tanu Weds Manu Returns
  - Sukriti Kakar - "Pehli Baar" from Dil Dhadakne Do
  - Vaishali Made - "Pinga" from Bajirao Mastani
  - Shraddha Kapoor - "Bezubaan Phir Se (Unplugged)" from ABCD 2
- 2016 Asees Kaur - "Bolna" from Kapoor & Sons
  - Aakanksha Sharma - "Tu Alvida" from Traffic
  - Aakanksha Sharma - "Dhal Jaun Main" from Rustom
  - Asees Kaur - "Rang Reza" from Beiimaan Love
  - Qurat-ul-Ain Balouch - "Kaari Kaari" from Pink
- 2017 Meghna Mishra - "Main Kaun Hoon" from Secret Superstar
  - Rajnigandha Shekhawat - "Kankad" from Shubh Mangal Saavdhan
  - Mehak Ali - "Baab-E-Rehmat" from Sheitaan
  - Meghna Mishra - "Meri Pyaari Ammi" from Secret Superstar
  - Meghna Mishra - "Nachdi Phira" from Secret Superstar
  - Parineeti Chopra - "Maana Ke Hum Yaar Nahin" from Meri Pyaari Bindu
  - Anushka Shahaney - "Stay a Little Longer" from Half Girlfriend
- 2018 Mahua Chokroborty - "Ab Maan Jao Sawaryia" from Angrezi Mein Kehte Hain
  - Harjot Kaur - "Sajan Bade Senti" from Badhaai Ho
  - Dhvani Bhanushali - "Dilbar" from Satyameva Jayate
  - Deveshi Sahgal - "Daryaa (Unplugged)" from Manmarziyaan
  - Jasmin Walia - "Bom Diggy" from Sonu Ke Titu Ki Sweety
- 2019 Aakanksha Sharma - "Tum Chale Gaye" from Marudhar Express
  - Swati Mehul - "Naah Goriye" from Bala
  - Hriti Tikadar - "Jiya" from Falsafa: The Other Side
  - Deepanshi Nagar - "Mann Mein Shiva" from Panipat
  - Sarodee Borah - "Sapne Jo Bhi" from Zindagi Tumse
- 2021 Sharvi Yadav – "Maari Chhalangein" – Skater Girl
  - Amrita Singh – "Shine On Me (Remix)" – Skater Girl
  - Khatija Rahman – "Rock A Bye Baby" – Mimi
  - Rakshita Suresh – "Yaane Yaane" – Mimi
  - Saindhavi Prakash – "Nain Bandhe Naino Se" – Thalaivii
- 2023 Sireesha Bhagavatula - "Ghodey Pe Sawar" - Qala
  - Sireesha Bhagavatula - "Phero Na Najariya" - Qala
  - Yohani - "Manike" - Thank God
  - Lothika - "Gehraiyaan (Title Track)" - Gehraiyaan
  - Lothika - "Doobey" - Gehraiyaan
- 2024 Deepthi Suresh - "Aararaari Raaro" - Jawan

== See also ==
- Mirchi Music Awards
- Bollywood
- Cinema of India
