= Next Enti? =

2018 film by Kunal Kohli

- Theatrical release poster
- Directed by: Kunal Kohli
- Screenplay by: Kunal Kohli
- Based on: Hum Tum
- Produced by: Sachiin Joshi; Raina Joshi; Akshai Puri
- Starring: Tamannaah Bhatia; Sundeep Kishan; Navdeep
- Cinematography: Maneesh Chandra Bhatt
- Edited by: Anil Kumar Bonthu
- Music by: Leon James
- Release date: 7 December 2018
- Running time: 117 minutes
- Country: India
- Language: Telugu

Next Enti? (transl. What next?) is a 2018 Indian Telugu-language romantic comedy film directed by Kunal Kohli, making his Telugu debut. The film stars Tamannaah Bhatia, Sundeep Kishan, and Navdeep. It is loosely based on Kohli's own Hindi film Hum Tum, which itself is based on When Harry Met Sally.... The music was composed by Leon James with cinematography by Manish Chandra Bhatt, and editing by Anil Kumar Bonthu. The film released on 7 December 2018. The film's title is based on a song from Nenu Local (2017).

== Plot ==
Tammy is a modern girl who breaks up with her boyfriend as he does not believe in true love. This is the time when she meets a marketing executive named Sanju and connects with him instantly. They start living together, but Tammy is against a physical relationship with Sanju. This upsets Sanju, and he breaks up with Tammy. During this time, Tammy starts liking Krish, a businessman with a past, while Sanju also moves on. Tammy and Krish begin a relationship, and this time, she believes that Krish is the one for her. The rest of the story is what happens between Tammy, Sanju, and Krish.

== Cast ==
- Tamannaah Bhatia as Tammy
- Sundeep Kishan as Sanju
- Navdeep as Krish
- Poonam Kaur as Prachiti
- Sarath Babu as Prakash, Tammy's father
- Harsha Vardhan as Sanju's friend
- Larissa Bonesi as Roshini
- Venkat Mikkilineni as Mahesh
- Milla as Baby Tammy
- Prajnaa Kumar and Laila Naim as Young Tammy

== Production ==
The film is Bollywood director Kunal Kohli's first Telugu film. Principal photography began in London in late-May 2017. The title Next Enti was revealed on 8 November 2018.

== Music ==
Next Enti?

Soundtrack album by Leon James
- Released: 10 November 2018
- Recorded: 2017–2018
- Genre: Feature Film Soundtrack
- Length: 21:16
- Label: T-Series
- Producer: Leon James

Leon James chronology
| Veera (2018) | Next Enti? (2018) | Silukkuvarupatti Singam (2018) |

Leon James makes his Telugu debut with this film.

All lyrics are written by Ramajogayya Sastry.

Track List
| No. | Title | Singer(s) | Length |
|---|---|---|---|
| 1. | "Oh No Never!" | Ash King, M. M. Manasi | 04:12 |
| 2. | "Na Nuve Na" | Shashaa Tirupati, Kapil Nair | 04:35 |
| 3. | "Love'Otsavam" | Benny Dayal, Jonita Gandhi | 04:20 |
| 4. | "Nee Bosi Navve" | Vijay Prakash | 03:44 |
| 5. | "Ontarigaane" | Sathyaprakash Dharmar | 04:30 |
| Total length: | | | 21:16 |

== Release ==
Next Enti was released on 7 December 2018.

== Reception ==
Hemanth Kumar writing for Firstpost rated the film 1 out of five, and criticised film's poor writing. "Kunal Kohli’s writing has the same annoying after effect of a tuning fork that’s thrusted into your ears. The problem isn’t with how ‘talkative’ everyone is, but it's more about what the film wants to say and how much it wants to say within two hours of its runtime," Kumar added. India Today critic Janani K, rated 1.5/5 and stated, "Bollywood director Kunal Kohli's debut Telugu film Next Enti tries to be a contemporary new age rom-com, but falls flat on its face." Neeshitha Nyayapati of The Times of India also rated 1.5 of 5, writing, "The conversations seem forced, so do most of the scenes. The character developments are so inconsistent that when they finally flesh out in the second half, it almost makes one wish they go back to being the flat cardboards they were in the first half."
