= Thoda Pyaar Thoda Magic =

- Film poster
- Directed by: Kunal Kohli
- Written by: Kunal Kohli; Rohena Gera
- Produced by: Aditya Chopra; Kunal Kohli
- Starring: Saif Ali Khan; Rani Mukerji; Rishi Kapoor; Ameesha Patel
- Cinematography: Sudeep Chatterjee
- Edited by: Amitabh Shukla
- Music by: Songs: Shankar–Ehsaan–Loy; Score: Sandeep Chowta
- Production companies: Yash Raj Films; Kunal Kohli Productions
- Distributed by: Yash Raj Films
- Release date: 27 June 2008
- Running time: 145 minutes
- Country: India
- Language: Hindi
- Budget: ₹230 million (US$2.4 million)
- Box office: ₹372.53 million (US$3.9 million)

Thoda Pyaar Thoda Magic (transl. A Little Love, A Little Magic) is a 2008 Indian Hindi-language fantasy comedy-drama film directed by Kunal Kohli and produced by Aditya Chopra under the Yash Raj Films banner. The film stars Saif Ali Khan and Rani Mukerji in lead roles, with supporting performances from Rishi Kapoor and Ameesha Patel. It also features child artists Akshat Chopra, Shriya Sharma, Rachit Sidana, and Ayushi Burman in prominent roles. The narrative follows the story of a troubled industrialist who is ordered by the court to care for four orphaned children until the arrival of a magical nanny transforms their lives.

The film marked Kohli's third directorial venture with Yash Raj Films, following Mujhse Dosti Karoge! (2002) and Hum Tum (2004). Principal photography took place in Mumbai and various locations across India, with cinematography by Sudeep Chatterjee. Visual effects were incorporated for the film's fantastical elements, with character animation supervised by Tata Elxsi. The music was composed by Shankar–Ehsaan–Loy, with lyrics by Prasoon Joshi.

Released theatrically on 27 June 2008, Thoda Pyaar Thoda Magic received mixed reviews from critics. While the performances, especially Mukerji's, and the light-hearted tone were praised, criticism was directed at its screenplay and inconsistent storytelling. The film grossed ₹37.25 crore against a budget of ₹23 crore and was declared a commercial failure by Box Office India.

== Plot ==
Ranbir Talwar, a wealthy and emotionally distant industrialist, is haunted by the loss of his loved ones, including his childhood friend and his mother. Distracted while driving, he accidentally causes a car accident that kills a couple, leaving behind their four orphaned children: Vashisht, Aditi, Iqbal, and Avantika, aged 9, 5, 7, and 6, respectively. As punishment, a judge sentences Ranbir to care for the children until the youngest child turns 18, forbidding him from placing them in boarding school or under anyone else's care, and he even gives a warning that failure to comply will result in a 20-year prison sentence without parole.

The children harbor resentment toward Ranbir and seek revenge, while he is ill-equipped for parenthood, leading to a strained and chaotic household. Desperate, the children pray to God for help. God decides to send Geeta, a playful and free-spirited angel, to guide them. Despite being warned not to use her magical powers on Earth, Geeta often does so for comic effect. Disguised as a governess, she quickly gains the children's trust and affection through her warmth and charm.

Geeta's presence gradually softens Ranbir, who becomes confused by her growing influence. Despite interference from his superficial girlfriend Malaika, Ranbir finds himself drawn to Geeta. After a disastrous birthday party orchestrated by Geeta and the children, Ranbir ends his relationship with Malaika and begins to invest emotionally in the children's lives. He accompanies them on a business trip to Los Angeles, where he defends them when they are mocked by his boss's children—marking a turning point in their relationship.

With her mission fulfilled, Geeta is summoned back to heaven. Distraught, Ranbir and the children pray for her return. Moved by their bond, God grants Geeta her wish to become human so she can return to them. She marries Ranbir, and they have a daughter who inherits Geeta's magical abilities. Although Geeta no longer possesses her own powers, the family lives happily together.

== Cast ==
- Saif Ali Khan as Ranbir Talwar
- Rani Mukerji as Geeta, an angel-turned human, Ranbir's wife
- Rishi Kapoor as God
- Ameesha Patel as Malaika
- Razak Khan as Pappu
- Akshat Chopra as Vashisht Walia
- Shriya Sharma as Aditi Walia
- Rachit Sidana as Iqbal Walia
- Ayushi Burman as Avantika Walia
- Sharat Saxena as Judge Jaswant Rai
- Mahesh Thakur as Lawyer
- Tarana Raja as Kapoor
- Danish Aslam as Mr. Gupta, child Ranbir's teacher
- Biren Patel as Yada
- Cameron Pearson as Steve
- Tigerlily Perry as Michelle
- Steven Schneider as American Boy

== Production ==
=== Development ===
Thoda Pyaar Thoda Magic was directed by Kunal Kohli and produced by Aditya Chopra under Yash Raj Films, marking Kohli's third collaboration with the studio after Mujhse Dosti Karoge! (2002) and Hum Tum (2004). Principal photography began in September 2007, with filming taking place in Delhi, Alibaug, Bangkok, and Los Angeles. Shooting was completed on 3 February 2008.

=== Casting ===
Saif Ali Khan and Rani Mukerji were cast in the lead roles, marking their second collaboration with Kohli after Hum Tum. Rishi Kapoor played the role of God, with Ameesha Patel in a supporting role. The child actors included Akshat Chopra, Shriya Sharma, Rachit Sidana, and Ayushi Burman.

=== Filming ===
Filming was conducted across multiple domestic and international locations, including Delhi, Alibaug, Bangkok, and Los Angeles. Additional sequences were shot at Universal Studios Hollywood and the San Diego Zoo, with some indoor scenes filmed at Yash Raj Studios in Mumbai.

== Soundtrack ==
Thoda Pyaar Thoda Magic

Soundtrack album by Shankar–Ehsaan–Loy
- Released: 21 May 2008
- Genre: Film soundtrack
- Length: 29:16
- Label: YRF Music
- Producer: Shankar–Ehsaan–Loy

Shankar–Ehsaan–Loy chronology
| Taare Zameen Par (2007) | Thoda Pyaar Thoda Magic (2008) | Rock On!! (2008) |

The music was composed by Shankar–Ehsaan–Loy, with lyrics by Prasoon Joshi.

| No. | Title | Singer(s) | Length |
|---|---|---|---|
| 1. | "Pyaar Ke Liye" | Shankar Mahadevan | 5:07 |
| 2. | "Nihaal Ho Gayi" | Shankar Mahadevan | 4:11 |
| 3. | "Bulbula" | Shankar Mahadevan, Sunidhi Chauhan | 3:21 |
| 4. | "Lazy Lamhe" | Anusha Mani | 5:12 |
| 5. | "Beetey Kal Se" | Shreya Ghoshal, Sneha Suresh | 4:56 |
| 6. | "Nihaal Ho Gayi" (DJ Aqeel Remix) | Shankar Mahadevan | 3:51 |
| 7. | "Lazy Lamhe"" (DJ Aqeel Remix) | Anusha Mani | 5:58 |

== Reception ==
=== Box office ===
Upon its release on 27 June 2008, Thoda Pyaar Thoda Magic opened across approximately 750 screens in India. The film garnered ₹3.34 crore on its opening day and accumulated ₹11.52 crore over its first weekend. By the end of its first week, it had collected ₹16.85 crore net in India. The film's total domestic net earnings stood at ₹21.67 crore, with a gross of ₹29.9 crore. Overseas, it earned approximately $1.71 million (₹6.83 crore), bringing its worldwide gross to ₹37.25 crore. Despite these figures, the film was declared a "flop" by Box Office India, as it failed to recover its production budget of ₹23 crore.

=== Critical reception ===
Thoda Pyaar Thoda Magic received mixed reviews from critics. On Rotten Tomatoes, the film holds an approval rating of 86% based on seven reviews, with an average rating of 6.7/10.

Nikhat Kazmi of The Times of India gave the film 3.5 out of 5 stars, praising the performances of the child actors and the light-hearted tone, calling it “a feel-good fantasy for the family.” Anil Sinanan of Time Out described it as “a skillful Bolly-blend of Mary Poppins (1964) meets The Sound of Music (1965),” awarding it 4 out of 5 stars. Common Sense Media noted the film's appeal to younger audiences, stating that "its themes of kindness and healing are suitable for family viewing."

In contrast, several reviewers found the narrative simplistic. Namrata Joshi of Outlook rated it 2 out of 5, calling it “a reasonably nice kiddie flick” that “fails to reach out to adults.” Raja Sen of Rediff.com remarked that the film “lacks emotional depth” and relies too heavily on formulaic storytelling. Khalid Mohamed of Hindustan Times criticized its tone and direction, writing, “This purported mad-in-India fantasy has as much subtlety and grace as a carpenter’s hathoda.”

== Accolades ==
| Award | Date of the ceremony | Category | Recipients | Result | Ref. |
|---|---|---|---|---|---|
| Stardust Awards | 15 February 2009 | Best Supporting Actress | Ameesha Patel | Nominated | |
| Stardust Awards | 15 February 2009 | New Musical Sensation (Female) | Anusha Mani (for "Lazy Lamhe") | Nominated | |
| Producers Guild Film Awards | 8 January 2010 | Best Special Effects | Neil Cunningham and M.S. Senthil Nathan | Nominated | |
