= Phir Se... =

2018 film directed by Kunal Kohli and Ajay Bhuyan

Phir Se
- Directed by: Kunal Kohli; Ajay Bhuyan
- Written by: Jyoti Kapoor
- Produced by: Shiv Kumar
- Starring: Kunal Kohli; Jennifer Winget
- Cinematography: Maneesh Chandra Bhatt
- Edited by: Dhawal Ashok Darji
- Music by: Songs: Jeet Gannguli; Background Score: Sandeep Shirodkar
- Production company: Bombay Film Company Ltd.
- Distributed by: The Bombay Film Company Ltd. (UK)
- Release date: 15 January 2018
- Country: India
- Language: Hindi

Phir Se (transl. Once again) is a 2018 Indian Hindi-language romance film directed by Kunal Kohli and Ajay Bhuyan. Initially slated for 2015 release, the film stars Kunal Kohli, Jennifer Winget and Sumona Chakravarti. Rajit Kapoor, Dalip Tahil, Kanwaljeet Singh and Sushmita Mukherjee are in supporting roles.

== Plot ==
The film presents a separated couple living in London, trying to come to terms with the consequences of their split.

== Cast ==
- Kunal Kohli as Jai Khanna
- Jennifer Winget as Kajal Kapoor
- Rajit Kapoor as Krish
- Sumona Chakravarti as Pia
- Dalip Tahil as Mikey
- Kanwaljeet Singh as Mr. Chadda
- Sushmita Mukherjee as Mummy Ji
- Atul Sharma as London Airport Commuter
- George Morris as The Wedding Planner
- Manmeet Singh as Judge
- Monisha Hassen as Lady in the Women's room
- Akash Pillay as Raj

== Production ==
=== Filming ===
The film was shot in Amritsar and London.

== Soundtrack ==
Phir Se...

Soundtrack album by Jeet Gannguli
- Released: 23 January 2018
- Genre: Feature film soundtrack
- Length: 21:23
- Label: T-Series
External audio
- Audio Jukebox on YouTube

Singles from Phir Se...
- 1. "Maine Socha K Chura Loon" Released: 23 January 2018; 2. "Phir Se (Title Track)" Released: 23 January 2018

The soundtrack was composed by Jeet Gannguli and lyrics were by Rashmi Virag. Singers include Shreya Ghoshal, Tulsi Kumar, Mohit Chauhan, Arijit Singh, Monali Thakur and Nikhil D'Souza. Shreya Ghoshal gave voice to 5 tracks of the album. The first song of the film is "Maine Socha Ki Chura Loon" released on 23 January 2018. The song "Rozana" was gifted to Kunal Kohli by T-Series manager Bhushan Kumar.

No.	Title	Artist (s)	Length
1.	"Phir Se" (Title Track)	Nikhil D'Souza, Shreya Ghoshal	04:14
2.	"Rozana"	Mohit Chauhan, Tulsi Kumar	03:53
3.	"Maine Socha Ke Chura Loon"	Arijit Singh, Shreya Ghoshal	04:26
4.	"Ye Dil Jo Hai Badmaash Hai"	Mohit Chauhan, Shreya Ghoshal, Monali Thakur	03:23
5.	"Phir Se" (Sad Version)	Nikhil D'Souza, Shreya Ghoshal	01:31
6.	"Phir Se" (Remix)	Nikhil D'Souza, Shreya Ghoshal, Jeet Gannguli	03:55

== Marketing ==
Kunal Kohli tweeted the theatrical poster of his film on 13 October 2014. It was first time any information about the film was revealed. The first look of the film was also revealed then.

The trailer was released through the movie's official Facebook and Twitter accounts and the T-Series YouTube channel on 7 April 2015. Celebrities including Karan Johar, Rishi Kapoor, Gautam Singhania, Farhan Akhtar, Priyanka Chopra, and Uday Chopra among many others tweeted about the movie and its trailer release.
