= The Romantics (TV series) =

Indian reality documentary series

- Genre: Documentary
- Created by: Smriti Mundhra
- Written by: Smriti Mundhra; Michael T Vollmann
- Directed by: Smriti Mundhra
- Country of origin: India
- Original languages: English and Hindi
- No. of episodes: 4

Production
- Executive producers: Aditya Chopra; Uday Chopra; Smriti Mundhara; Jonathan Reiman
- Cinematography: Lars Skree
- Editors: Michael Bourne; Michael T. Vollmann
- Production company: YRF Entertainment

Original release
- Release: 14 February 2023

The Romantics is a 2023 documentary series, created by Smriti Mundhra and Michael T Vollmann. The four-part series explores the impact of Yash Chopra, his son Aditya Chopra, and their company Yash Raj Films on Hindi Cinema.

== List of films featured ==
=== Episode 1: The Boy from Jalandhar ===
Year	Film	Cast	Notes
1957	Naya Daur	Dilip Kumar	
1957	Naya Daur	Vyjayanthimala	
1959	Dhool Ka Phool	Ashok Kumar	Directorial debut of Yash Chopra
1959	Dhool Ka Phool	Rajendra Kumar	Directorial debut of Yash Chopra
1959	Dhool Ka Phool	Mala Sinha	Directorial debut of Yash Chopra
1959	Dhool Ka Phool	Nanda	Directorial debut of Yash Chopra
1961	Dharmputra	Shashi Kapoor	
1961	Dharmputra	Mala Sinha	
1965	Waqt	Raaj Kumar	
1965	Waqt	Sunil Dutt	
1965	Waqt	Shashi Kapoor	
1965	Waqt	Sadhana	
1965	Waqt	Sharmila Tagore	
1973	Daag	Rajesh Khanna	
1973	Daag	Sharmila Tagore	
1973	Daag	Raakhee	
1975	Deewaar	Amitabh Bachchan	Considered a "landmark" in Hindi Cinema; See also: Angry Young Men (miniseries)
1975	Deewaar	Shashi Kapoor	Considered a "landmark" in Hindi Cinema; See also: Angry Young Men (miniseries)
1975	Deewaar	Neetu Singh	Considered a "landmark" in Hindi Cinema; See also: Angry Young Men (miniseries)
1975	Deewaar	Parveen Babi	Considered a "landmark" in Hindi Cinema; See also: Angry Young Men (miniseries)
1976	Kabhi Kabhie	Amitabh Bachchan	
1976	Kabhi Kabhie	Shashi Kapoor	
1976	Kabhi Kabhie	Raakhee Gulzar	
1976	Kabhi Kabhie	Waheeda Rehman	
1976	Kabhi Kabhie	Rishi Kapoor	
1976	Kabhi Kabhie	Neetu Singh	
1981	Silsila	Shashi Kapoor	
1981	Silsila	Amitabh Bachchan	
1981	Silsila	Jaya Bachchan	
1981	Silsila	Rekha	
1984	Mashaal	Dilip Kumar	
1984	Mashaal	Anil Kapoor	
1984	Mashaal	Saeed Jaffrey	
1985	Faasle	Sunil Dutt	
1985	Faasle	Rekha	
1988	Vijay	Rajesh Khanna	
1988	Vijay	Hema Malini	
1988	Vijay	Rishi Kapoor	
1988	Vijay	Anil Kapoor	
1988	Vijay	Saeed Jaffrey	
1988	Vijay	Anupam Kher	
1989	Chandni	Sridevi	
1989	Chandni	Rishi Kapoor	
1989	Chandni	Vinod Khanna	

=== Episode 2: Prodigal Son ===
Year	Film	Cast	Notes
1991	Lamhe	Sridevi	
1991	Lamhe	Anil Kapoor	
1991	Lamhe	Waheeda Rehman	
1991	Lamhe	Anupam Kher	
1993	Darr	Sunny Deol	
1993	Darr	Juhi Chawla	
1993	Darr	Shah Rukh Khan	
1995	Dilwale Dulhania Le Jayenge	Shah Rukh Khan	Directorial debut of Aditya Chopra
1995	Dilwale Dulhania Le Jayenge	Kajol	Directorial debut of Aditya Chopra

=== Episode 3: The New Guard ===
Year	Film	Cast	Notes
2000	Mohabbatein	Shah Rukh Khan	Rebooted Amitabh Bachchan's career; directed by Aditya Chopra
2000	Mohabbatein	Amitabh Bachchan	Rebooted Amitabh Bachchan's career; directed by Aditya Chopra
2000	Mohabbatein	Aishwarya Rai	Rebooted Amitabh Bachchan's career; directed by Aditya Chopra
2000	Mohabbatein	Uday Chopra	Rebooted Amitabh Bachchan's career; directed by Aditya Chopra
2000	Mohabbatein	Jugal Hansraj	Rebooted Amitabh Bachchan's career; directed by Aditya Chopra
2000	Mohabbatein	Jimmy Sheirgill	Rebooted Amitabh Bachchan's career; directed by Aditya Chopra
2002	Mujhse Dosti Karoge!	Hrithik Roshan	
2002	Mujhse Dosti Karoge!	Rani Mukerji	
2002	Mujhse Dosti Karoge!	Kareena Kapoor Khan	
2002	Mujhse Dosti Karoge!	Uday Chopra	
2004	Hum Tum	Saif Ali Khan	
2004	Hum Tum	Rani Mukerji	
2004	Hum Tum	Rishi Kapoor	
2004	Hum Tum	Jimmy Sheirgill	
2004	Dhoom	Abhishek Bachchan	
2004	Dhoom	John Abraham	
2004	Dhoom	Uday Chopra	
2004	Veer-Zaara	Shah Rukh Khan	
2004	Veer-Zaara	Rani Mukerji	
2004	Veer-Zaara	Preity Zinta	
2004	Veer-Zaara	Amitabh Bachchan	
2004	Veer-Zaara	Hema Malini	
2005	Bunty Aur Babli	Amitabh Bachchan	
2005	Bunty Aur Babli	Abhishek Bachchan	
2005	Bunty Aur Babli	Rani Mukerji	
2007	Chak De! India	Shah Rukh Khan	The film's theme song is frequently played, or sung by fans, at sports events in India.
2007	Chak De! India	Vidya Malvade	The film's theme song is frequently played, or sung by fans, at sports events in India.
2007	Chak De! India	Shilpa Shukla	The film's theme song is frequently played, or sung by fans, at sports events in India.
2007	Chak De! India	Sagarika Ghatge	The film's theme song is frequently played, or sung by fans, at sports events in India.
2007	Chak De! India	Anaitha Nair	The film's theme song is frequently played, or sung by fans, at sports events in India.
2007	Chak De! India	Seema Azmi	The film's theme song is frequently played, or sung by fans, at sports events in India.

=== Episode 4: Legacy ===
Year	Film	Stars	Notes
2008	Rab Ne Bana Di Jodi	Shah Rukh Khan	Directed by Aditya Chopra Special appearances in the song "Phir Milenge Chalte Chalte": Preity Zinta as Sharmila Tagore; Kajol as Nargis; Rani Mukerji as Neetu Singh; Bipasha Basu as Sadhana Shivdasani; Lara Dutta as Helen
2008	Rab Ne Bana Di Jodi	Anushka Sharma	Directed by Aditya Chopra Special appearances in the song "Phir Milenge Chalte Chalte": Preity Zinta as Sharmila Tagore; Kajol as Nargis; Rani Mukerji as Neetu Singh; Bipasha Basu as Sadhana Shivdasani; Lara Dutta as Helen
2012	Jab Tak Hai Jaan	Shah Rukh Khan	Final film of Yash Chopra
2012	Jab Tak Hai Jaan	Anushka Sharma	Final film of Yash Chopra
2012	Jab Tak Hai Jaan	Katrina Kaif	Final film of Yash Chopra
2012	Jab Tak Hai Jaan	Anupam Kher	Final film of Yash Chopra
2012	Jab Tak Hai Jaan	Neetu Singh	Final film of Yash Chopra
2012	Jab Tak Hai Jaan	Rishi Kapoor	Final film of Yash Chopra

== Featured interviews ==
=== Chopra family ===
- Yash Chopra (archival footage)
- Aditya Chopra
- Pamela Chopra
- Uday Chopra
- Rani Mukerji
- Karan Johar

=== Other Actors ===
- Dharmendra Deol
- Amitabh Bachchan
- Vinod Khanna
- Mithun Chakraborty
- Rishi Kapoor
- Sunny Deol
- Anil Kapoor
- Juhi Chawla
- Jackie Shroff
- Mohnish Bahl
- Madhuri Dixit
- Arjun Rampal
- Ajay Devgn
- Saif Ali Khan
- Salman Khan
- Aamir Khan
- Shah Rukh Khan
- Hrithik Roshan
- Karishma Kapoor
- Abhishek Bachchan
- Sanjay Dutt
- Govinda Ahuja
- Manisha Koirala
- Sunil Shetty
- Arshad Warsi
- Sushmita Sen
- Bobby Deol
- Akshaye Khanna
- Dino Morea
- Aftab Shivdasani
- Namrata Shirodkar
- Vivek Oberoi
- Tusshar Kapoor
- Kajol Devgn
- Aishwarya Rai Bachchan
- John Abraham
- Emraan Hashmi
- Zayed Khan
- Shahid Kapoor
- Ameesha Patel
- Kareena Kapoor Khan
- Imran Khan
- Neil Nitin Mukesh
- Jugal Hansraj
- Jimmy Shergill
- Bipasha Basu
- Lara Dutta
- Dia Mirza
- Isha Koppikar
- Neha Dhupia
- Ranbir Kapoor
- Ranveer Singh
- Katrina Kaif
- Deepika Padukone
- Arjun Kapoor
- Anushka Sharma
- Ayushmann Khurrana
- Bhumi Pednekar
- Neetu Singh
- Sooraj Barjatya
- Ashutosh Rana
- Anupam Kher
- Akshay Kumar
- Preity Zinta

=== Filmmakers, choreographers, and writers ===
- Vijay Krishna Acharya
- Sooraj Barjatya
- Anupama Chopra
- Salim Khan
- Manish Malhotra
- Vaibhavi Merchant
- Namrata Rao
- Maneesh Sharma
- Lilly Singh

== Reception ==
On the review aggregator website Rotten Tomatoes, 83% of 6 critics' reviews are positive.

Suchin Mehrotra of Hindustan Times in his review stated "The Romantics works best when it uses the YRF filmography merely as a stepping-off point to discuss Hindi cinema as a whole. The show comes to us at a time when it feels like filmmakers are looking back and celebrating what was." A reviewer for Indian Express stated "It’s all rah-rah, hardly any nose-digs, but then you don’t really expect any in a series like this, about the biggest, most storied production house in Hindi cinema." Renuka Vyavahare of The Times of India rated the first season 4 stars out of 5 and remarked "The Romantics is a treat to watch if you love Hindi cinema and Yash Chopra, which are pretty much synonymous." Shubham Kulkarni from Koimoi rated 4/5 and wrote "The Romantics is an ode to the man who defined Hindi cinema for decades and even died with his director’s hat on."

== See also ==
- Angry Young Men (2024)
- The Roshans (2025)
