= The Perfect Girl (2015 film) =

- Directed by: Prakash Nambiar
- Written by: Prakash Nambiar
- Produced by: Udit Shivraj Pathak
- Starring: Tara Alisha Berry; Teeshay Shah; Shishir Sharma; Raju Kher; Sonali Sachdev; Smita Hai
- Cinematography: Girish Kant
- Edited by: Shiva Bayappa
- Music by: Soumil Shringarpure; Siddharth Mahadevan
- Release date: 11 September 2015
- Running time: 100 minutes
- Country: India
- Language: Hindi
- Budget: approx ₹ 95 Lakhs

The Perfect Girl is a 2015 Hindi-language Indian feature film written and directed by Prakash Nambiar.

The first look of the film was launched 24 August 2015, the film's release on 11 September 2015. The Perfect Girl is a film written and directed by Prakash Nambiar, in his directorial debut produced by Udit Shivraj Pathak under the banner Creative Ocean Entertainment Pvt. Ltd. in association with Kathaa Animations. Neha Pandey did the casting for the movie

== Plot ==
In the tourist town of Goa, Vedika, a young girl is waiting for a bus which has been delayed by an hour. Jay, a young boy catches fancy of her and tries to spark of a conversation. Initially cold to each other, both of them go for a little walk before the delayed bus arrives. What happens when two strangers meet for just over an hour and realise they are perfect for each other? What if life has other plans? Would you wait for your destined perfect other, or would you move on?

== Cast ==
- Teeshay Shah as Jay
- Tara Alisha Berry as Vedika
- Shishir Sharma as Praveen
- Sonali Sachdev as Meera
- Raju Kher as Producer
- Smita Hai as Art Curator
- Asha Sharma
- Vikram Singh Chauhan as Kartik
- Vijay Shetty as Waiter

== Audience Reception ==
As of April 20, 2021 the film has over 6.5 million views on YouTube. It's unique among all love stories, said Priya Raj one of the viewer. "if you are thinking about you should watch it or not, just listen to your heart and give it a shot you will love it" read another review. "Indispensable. How can just those long scenes make u fall in love" followed in their review.

== Critical reception ==
The Perfect Girl received mix reviews from the critics. Subhash K. Jha gave the film 3 out of 5 stars, saying "The plot of debutant director Prakash Nambiar’s delicate rom-com dodges complications and unnecessary characters to focus on the here-and-now of the relationship that grows out of the chance encounter. The film is shot in real time. The hour that the couple spends together is handed down to us verbatim. This gives the proceedings a real raciness, a motivational push beyond what other boy-meets-girl films have to offer."

Renuka Vyavhare of Times of India gave it 2.5 out of 5 Stars. She says "However, what begins as an interesting tale on serendipity and conversation romance on the lines of Before Sunrise (1995) and Before Sunset (2004), gets too philosophical to digest after a while. You wonder why two youngsters in their mid 20s harp on things like reincarnation and childhood trauma. This is where the drama loses grip and ends up becoming a conventional love story."

Critic Shaiju Mathew gave a rating of 3 out of 5 stars. He lauded the performances of the lead actors. "Coming to performances, Teeshay and Tara both are apt for their parts and they bring life to their characters – Jay & Vedhika with their brilliant performances. Tara is cute, bubbly and loveable. She gets into her character effortlessly and makes the character of Vedhika her own. The chemistry between the lead pair is quite electrifying and you want to see more of them together onscreen. The story and screenplay are quite simple however the dialogues in parts showcases the quirky sense of humor of the director / writer."
