= Lazy Lamhe =

Single by Shankar–Ehsaan–Loy (composers) & Anusha Mani (singer)

from the album Thoda Pyaar Thoda Magic
- Released: 21 May 2008
- Genre: Filmi, pop-folk, dance-pop
- Length: 5:11 (soundtrack album); 4:56 (music video)
- Label: YRF Music
- Composer: Shankar–Ehsaan–Loy
- Lyricist: Prasoon Joshi
- Producer: Shankar–Ehsaan–Loy

"Lazy Lamhe" (transl. Lazy Moments) is a seduction song written by Prasoon Joshi and composed by Shankar–Ehsaan–Loy for the film Thoda Pyaar Thoda Magic. Picturised on Saif Ali Khan, Ameesha Patel and Rani Mukerji, the song features vocals by Anusha Mani.

The scene in which the song was featured was when Saif, Rani and her children arrive at a pool party hosted by Ameesha Patel, who starts singing and dancing with Saif while Rani and the children ruin her birthday party attempting to terminate the affair between Saif and Ameesha. The lobsters, seagulls and the bugs were all animated by CGI. The music video was shot in 8 days.

== Reception ==
Jaspreet Pandohar of BBC.com wrote, "[Prasoon] Joshi does an equally good job with Lazy Lamhe which stands out for its 'Hinglish' wordplay, Anusha Mani's sensual vocals and mix of Arabic and Balearic inspired beats. Picturised on a poolside bikini clad Amisha Patel, this item number is bound to boost both the actress and film’s popularity." Megha Menon of IANS wrote, "The song Lazy lamhe comes as a surprise and singer Anusha Mani's rendition brings with it a whiff of freshness. A sensuous and seductive number, the track is a slow one with a few contemporary sounds thrown in. Prasoon Joshi's experiment with the lyrics is interesting."

Anusha Mani was nominated for a New Musical Sensation (Female) award at Stardust Awards.
