= Prakash Nambiar =

Indian film producer

- Born: Prakash Nambiar; Pariyaram, Kerala India
- Education: Rachna Sansad's Academy of Architecture, Mumbai
- Occupations: Film director; writer; producer; author
- Years active: 2001–present
- Known for: Hum Tum
- Awards: Star Screen Award

Prakash Nambiar is a film director, producer, film writer, animator, entrepreneur and an author based in Mumbai. He's best known for the creation of two animated characters "Hum & Tum" for Yash Raj Films under his company Kathaa Animations. The characters were used in the critically acclaimed award-winning film of the same name Hum Tum (2004). Both characters are one of the most successful animated characters to be used in mainstream Bollywood film.

Nambiar marked his feature film directorial debut with The Perfect Girl (2015). Nambiar's book "The Blunder Years: Memoirs of an Introverted Teenager" released on Amazon.com in 2020. He is the co-founder of FFTG Awards Film Fest, an annual international digital event, based in New York.

== Early life and career ==
Prakash Nambiar was born into an engineering family in Pariyaram in Kerala and spent a few years there before moving to Bombay, now Mumbai due to his father's machine designing work. He is an architect from the Rachna Sansad's Academy of Architecture. A chance meeting with a friend who was working at UTV Animations, introduced him to the world of animation. He soon quit his architecture career and started developing coding skills for multimedia games and founded Kathaa Animations in 2001. The company went on to create two animated characters titled Hum Tum for the Hindi language romantic comedy film of the same name. Kathaa Animations won the Star Screen Award for Best Visual effects for its animation work in the year 2004. Nambiar's body of work went on to produce and direct digital films for international brands including Cadbury, Tanishq Jewelers, several short films for Idea Cellular and Hyundai featuring Indian actor Shah Rukh Khan.

He marked his feature film directorial debut with The Perfect Girl (2015) starring Tara Alisha Berry, Teeshay Shah. As of April 20, 2021 the has film over 6.5 million views on YouTube garnering positive reviews. It's very unique among all love story ever, said Priya Raj one of the viewer. "if you are thinking about you should watch it or not, just listen to your heart and give it a shot you will love it" read another review. "Indispensable. How can just those long scenes make u fall in love" followed another review among several others.

Nambiar's upcoming directorial is a biopic on Hawa Singh known as the father of Indian boxing featuring Sooraj Pancholi. The film is produced by Kamlesh Singh Kushwah, Sam Fernandes and written by Junaid Wasi. On 4 February 2020 the first look poster for Hawa Singh was released through Twitter by Indian actor Salman Khan with the caption "Hawa se baatein karega singh (This Singh will fly)" garnering numerous views and appreciation from audience and peers.

== Filmography ==
†	Denotes films that have not yet been released

Year	Film	Director	Producer	Writer	Animator	Notes
2004	Hum Tum				Yes	animator
2011	I dream of hope	Yes	Yes	Yes		short directorial debut
2015	The Perfect Girl	Yes	Yes	Yes		feature directorial debut
2021	Hawa Singh†	Yes				
2022	Rocketry: The Nambi Effect		Yes			creative producer

== Awards ==
- 2004 Star Screen Award Best Special Effects - Hum Tum (You and Me)
- 2023 69th National Film Awards - Best Feature Film - Rocketry: The Nambi Effect
