= Lahore Confidential =

- Promotional poster
- Directed by: Kunal Kohli
- Written by: S. Hussain Zaidi; Vibha Singh
- Produced by: Ajay Rai
- Starring: Richa Chadda; Karishma Tanna; Arunoday Singh
- Cinematography: Karthik Ganesh
- Edited by: Nikhil Parihar
- Production company: JAR Pictures
- Distributed by: ZEE5
- Release date: 4 February 2021
- Running time: 68 minutes
- Country: India
- Languages: Hindi; Urdu

Lahore Confidential is a 2021 Indian Hindi-language spy thriller film which premiered on ZEE5 on 4 February 2021. The film is directed by Kunal Kohli. It is created by S. Hussain Zaidi and stars Richa Chadda and Arunoday Singh. The film is about R&AW agents in Lahore investigating a Pakistani terrorist group's activities. It is a sequel to the 2020 film London Confidential, which premiered on ZEE5.

== Plot ==
The Story revolves around a humble Indian woman named Ananya Srivastav (Richa Chadda), who works with RAW. In order to get away from her mundane life, she wants an overseas assignment from the government. However, she finds herself on a secret intelligence mission in Pakistan.

== Cast ==
- Richa Chadda as Ananya Srivastav
- Karishma Tanna as Yukti
- Arunoday Singh as Rauf Ahmed Kazmi / Wasim Ahmed Khan
- Alka Amin as Mrs. Srivastav, Ananya's mother
- Khalid Siddiqui as RD
- Kanan Arunachalam as Subramaniam
- Abdullah Osman as Pathan
- Fareed Khan as Qadir Bhai

== Release ==
Lahore Confidential premiered on ZEE5 on 4 February 2021.

== Reception ==
Lahore Confidential did not receive a great response. It was regarded as an abject movie with zero thrills. It was also said that director Kunal Kohli had nothing new to offer in this film. On the review aggregator website Rotten Tomatoes, 20% of 5 critics' reviews are positive, with an average rating of 3.5/10.
