= Mehak Ali =

Pakistani singer

- مہک علی
- Born: Nankana Sahib, Pakistan; 24 February 1992 (29 years)

Mehak Ali (Urdu: مہک علی, born: 24 February 1992 in Nankana Sahib, Pakistan) is a Pakistani singer. She debuted in Bollywood with a song Baab E Rehmat in the 2017 film Sheitaan for which she was nominated for Mirchi Music Award for Upcoming Female Vocalist of The Year at the 10th Mirchi Music Awards, becoming the first Pakistani singer to be nominated for this award.

== Early life ==
She was born on 24 February 1992 in Nankana Sahib and studied B.A. In 2013, she moved to Lahore along with her family. She started her music career with a local music competition at the age of 8. In 2012, she won the Pakistani music competition Music Talent Hunt.

Her debut song was "Baandi". She was featured in the 4th season of Nescafé Basement, a Pakistani music television series, with her song "Kameez Teri Kaali" which was a major hit in Pakistan.

== Awards and nominations ==
Year	Awards	Nominated work	Result	Ref.
2017	Mirchi Music Award for Upcoming Female Vocalist of The Year	"Baab E Rehmat"	Nominated	
2017	Pakistan Music Media Award for Female Singer		Nominated	
2017	BBC Asian Music Award	"Baandi"	Nominated	
2019	Galaxy Lollywood Awards	"Lahore Tere Te"	Nominated	

== Discography ==
=== Films ===
Year	Film	Song	Ref.
2015	Dekh Magar Pyaar Say	"Kaala Dooriya"	
2018	Jawani Phir Nahi Ani 2	"Lahore Terey Tay"	

=== Singles ===
Year	Track Name	Ref.
2016	"Kameez Teri Kaali"	
2016	"Baandi"	
2017	"Ishq"	
2017	"Rafta Rafta"	
2017	"Beparwah"	
2017	"Jogi"	
2017	"Sajni"	
2018	"Bewafa"	
