= Tara Alisha Berry =

Indian actress

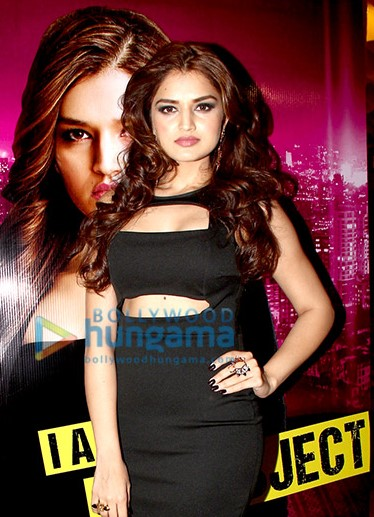
- Berry in 2016
- Born: India
- Occupation: Actress
- Years active: 2010–present
- Relatives: Sikandar Kher (half-brother)

Tara Alisha Berry is an Indian actress, known for her works in Hindi, Tamil and Telugu films. She started out with a music video with Shaan, called Khudgarzi, produced by Eros in 2011. Her debut Hindi film was Mastram.

Her next release was Chokher Bali, directed by Anurag Basu, which aired on Epic TV in 2015 as part of a series called Stories by Rabindranath Tagore. On 11 September 2015, her film The Perfect Girl, directed by Prakash Nambiar, was released. In 2017, she starred in the first album of Gaurav Sharma Tu Pyar Hai Mera.

Berry was then signed on by Vishesh Films for a three-film deal. Her first Vishesh Films release is Love Games, directed by Vikram Bhatt produced by Vishesh Films and T-Series. In 2020, Berry again featured in the web series Mastram.

== Early life ==
Berry was born on 19 May 1988. Berry is daughter of Gautam Berry (first husband of Kirron Kher) and actress Nandini Sen.

== Filmography ==
=== Film ===
Year	Film	Role	Language	Notes
2011	100% Love	Swapna	Telugu	Debut Film
2011	Money Money, More Money	Meghana	Telugu	
2014	Mastram	Renu	Hindi	Hindi Debut
2015	The Perfect Girl	Vedika	Hindi	
2016	Moreechika	Oni	Bengali	Short film
2016	Love Games	Alisha Asthana	Hindi	
2017	Agam	Sarla	Hindi	
2018	You and I	Girl	Hindi	Short film
2018	Marudhar Express	Chitra	Hindi	
2018	Teen Paheliyan	Kusum	Hindi	TV movie; Mirchi Malini segment
2019	Gun Pe Done	Razia	Hindi	
2019	A1	Divya	Tamil	Tamil Debut
2020	Biskoth	Anitha	Tamil	
2024	Murder Mubarak	Ganga	Hindi	Feature film
2025	Bhagwat: Chapter One – Raakshas	Summi	Hindi	

=== TV and web series ===
Year	Title	Role	Language	Platform	Note
2015	Stories by Rabindranath Tagore	Ashalata	Hindi	Epic TV channel	Episodes1, 2 and 3 (Chokher Bali)
2018- 2019	Love Lust and Confusion	Poroma Sarkar	Hindi	Viu	Season 1 and 2
2020	Mastram	Madhu	Hindi	MX Player	
2020	State Of Siege: 26/11	Parvati Patil	Hindi	ZEE5	
2020	Disconnected	Tara	English	YouTube	
2021	Firsts	Pakhi	Hindi	YouTube	Season 6
2026	Vimal Khanna	Jyoti	Hindi	Amazon MX Player	
