= Teeshay Shah =

Indian model

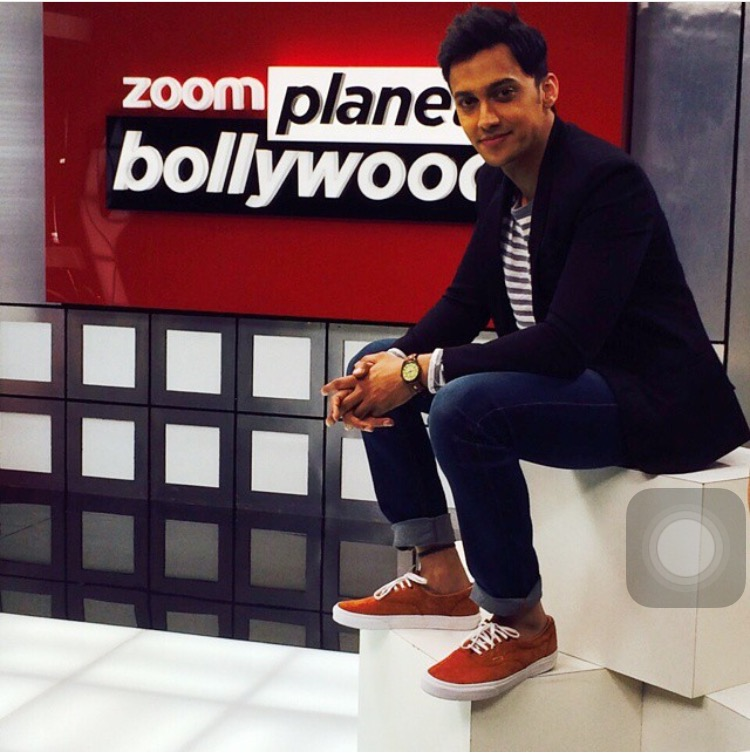
- Teeshay on Planet Bollywood in 2015
- Born: Mumbai, Maharashtra, India
- Occupations: Actor; Model; Director; Host
- Years active: 2009–present
- Height: 178 cm (5 ft 10 in)

Teeshay Shah (also known as Teeshay) is an Indian actor, model, and host working in Bollywood and regional cinema. He's known for his work as a host on the Zoom TV Channel show Planet Bollywood. He has written and directed short plays for Balancing Act Productions. He has explored his anchoring space as a sports presenter on Star Sports and hosted the show Match Point.

== Career ==
Teeshay Shah has acted in the Bollywood movies Blood Money, Fast Forward, Yahaan Sabki Lagi Hai, The Perfect Girl, and the regional movie I Wish. Also, he has acted in the TV shows Yeh Hai Aashiqui, Love by Chance, Everest, Gumrah: End of Innocence, Yeh Hai Aashiqui Siyappa Ishq Ka, and Gulmohar Grand.

Ashutosh Gowariker, with whom Teeshay worked in Everest, praised his talent and referred him for the TV show Gulmohar Grand.

He moved to Los Angeles in 2017. His film Hiraeth released on Amazon Prime in December 2019. He was last seen on the hit CBS Show Seal Team. Teeshay has also acted in numerous commercials in Hollywood.

== Filmography ==
=== Film ===
Year	Title	Role	Language	Notes
2009	Fast Forward		Hindi	
2012	Blood Money	Sean	Hindi	
2015	Yahaan Sabki Lagi Hai	Shanti	Hindi, English	
2015	The Perfect Girl	Jay	Hindi	
2017	Mixed Medium	Dev	English	
2018	The Bird	Roy	English	
2018	Hiraeth	Writer and Director	English	
2020	Last Call	Jake	English	
2021	A Furry Little Christmas	David	English	
2023	I Wish	Vismay Joshi	Gujarati	

=== Television ===
Year	Title	Role	Language	Notes
2014	Yeh Hai Aashiqui	Purab/Vickey	Hindi	Episode 41/Episode 82
2014	Love by Chance	Rishabh	Hindi	Episode 20
2015	Planet Bollywood	Teeshay	Hindi	Host
2014	Everest	Biju	Hindi	
2015	Gumrah: End of Innocence		Hindi	2 Episodes
2015	Yeh Hai Aashiqui Siyappa Ishq Ka	Avi	Hindi	Episode 6
2015	Gulmohar Grand	Teeshay	Hindi	
2016	Match Point	Teeshay	English	Host
2016	SuperCops vs Supervillains	Rahul	Hindi	1 Episode
2019	Seal Team		English	Season 3 Episode 10
