= 50th Filmfare Awards =

2005 awards for Hindi cinema

- Date: 26 February 2005
- Site: MMRDA Grounds, Bandra Kurla Complex, Mumbai
- Hosted by: Saif Ali Khan
- Official website: www.filmfare.com

Highlights
- Best Film: Veer-Zaara
- Critics Award for Best Film: Dev and Yuva
- Most awards: Yuva (6)
- Most nominations: Veer-Zaara (15)

Television coverage
- Network: Sony Entertainment Television (India)

The 50th Filmfare Awards, honoring Cinema of India, took place on 26 February 2005 in Mumbai. This was the awards' golden jubilee year and to commemorate the occasion, the Filmfare award trophy (the Black Lady statue) was made in gold. Moreover, a special award, Best Film in 50 Years, was also presented to Ramesh Sippy's Sholay (1975).

Veer-Zaara led the ceremony with 15 nominations, followed by Main Hoon Na with 12 nominations, Hum Tum and Swades with 8 nominations, and Yuva with 7 nominations each.

Yuva earned 6 awards, including Best Supporting Actor (for Abhishek Bachchan) and Best Supporting Actress (for Rani Mukherji), thus becoming the most-awarded film at the ceremony.

Shah Rukh Khan received triple nominations for Best Actor for his performances in Main Hoon Na, Swades and Veer-Zaara, winning for Swades.

Akshay Kumar received dual nominations for Best Supporting Actor for his performances in Khakee and Mujhse Shaadi Karogi, but lost to Abhishek Bachchan who won the award for Yuva.

Rani Mukherji set an unmatched record, becoming the only actress to win both popular female acting awards in the same year, winning Best Actress for Hum Tum and Best Supporting Actress for Yuva. She also received an additional Best Supporting Actress nomination for her performance in Veer-Zaara.

== Main awards ==
- The winners are listed first and indicated in **boldface**.

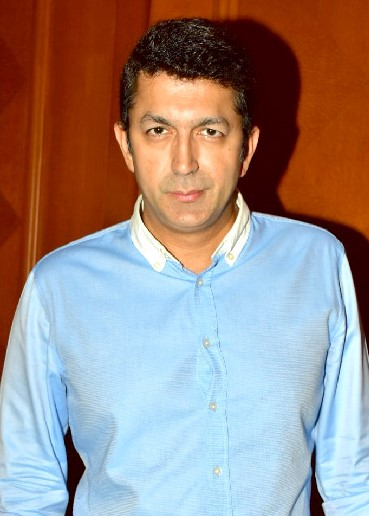
Kunal Kohli, Best Director winner

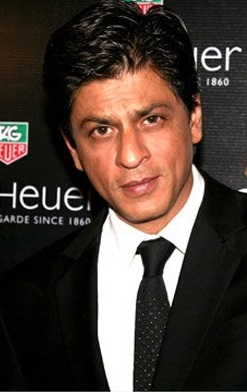
Shah Rukh Khan, Best Actor winner

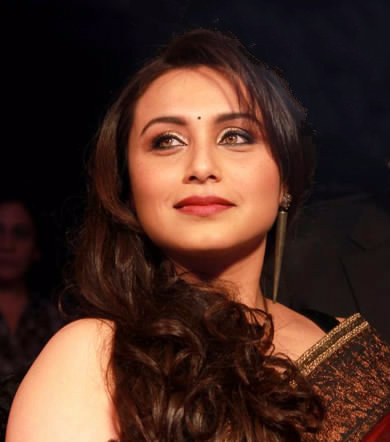
Rani Mukerji, Best Actress and Best Supporting Actress winner

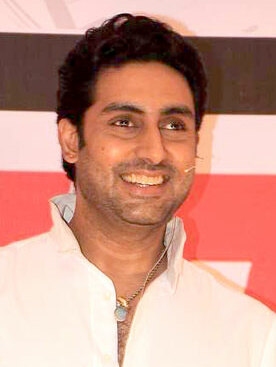
Abhishek Bachchan, Best Supporting Actor winner

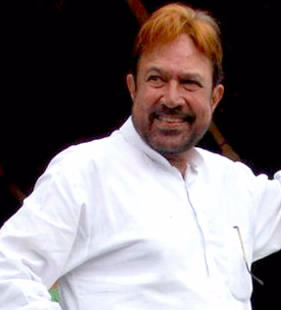
Rajesh Khanna, Lifetime Achievement Awardee

=== Main Awards ===
Best Film	Best Director
**Veer-Zaara**; Dhoom; Hum Tum; Main Hoon Na; Swades	**Kunal Kohli – Hum Tum**; Ashutosh Gowariker – Swades; Farah Khan – Main Hoon Na; Farhan Akhtar – Lakshya; Rajkumar Santoshi – Khakee; Yash Chopra – Veer-Zaara
Best Actor	Best Actress
**Shah Rukh Khan – Swades** as Mohan Bhargav; Amitabh Bachchan – Khakee as D.C.P. Anand K. Srivastava; Irrfan Khan – Maqbool as Miyan Maqbool; Hrithik Roshan – Lakshya as Karan Shergill; Saif Ali Khan – Hum Tum as Karan Kapoor; Shah Rukh Khan – Main Hoon Na as Major Ram Prasad Sharma; Shah Rukh Khan – Veer-Zaara as Squadron Leader Veer Pratap Singh	**Rani Mukerji – Hum Tum** as Rhea Prakash; Aishwarya Rai – Raincoat as Neerja; Preity Zinta – Veer-Zaara as Zaara Hayaat Khan; Shilpa Shetty – Phir Milenge as Tamanna Sahni; Kareena Kapoor – Aitraaz as Priya Saxena; Urmila Matondkar – Ek Hasina Thi as Sarika Vartak
Best Supporting Actor	Best Supporting Actress
**Abhishek Bachchan – Yuva** as Lallan Singh; Akshay Kumar – Khakee as S.I. Shekhar Verma; Akshay Kumar – Mujhse Shaadi Karogi as Sunny; Amitabh Bachchan – Veer-Zaara as Choudhary Sumer Singh; Zayed Khan – Main Hoon Na as Lakshman Prasad "Lucky" Sharma	**Rani Mukerji – Yuva** as Shashi Lal Biswas; Amrita Rao – Main Hoon Na as Sanjana Bakshi; Divya Dutta – Veer-Zaara as Shabana 'Shabbo' Ibrahim; Priyanka Chopra – Aitraaz as Sonia Roy; Rani Mukerji – Veer-Zaara as Saamiya Siddiqui
Best Performance in a Comic Role	Best Performance in a Negative Role
**Saif Ali Khan – Hum Tum** as Karan Kapoor; Akshay Kumar – Mujhse Shaadi Karogi as Sunny; Arshad Warsi – Hulchul as Lucky Bhalla; Boman Irani – Main Hoon Na as Principal; Paresh Rawal – Hulchul as Kishan A. Chand / Murari	**Priyanka Chopra – Aitraaz** as Sonia Roy; Abhishek Bachchan – Yuva as Lallan Singh; Ajay Devgan – Khakee as Yashwant Angre; John Abraham – Dhoom as Kabir; Sunil Shetty – Main Hoon Na as Raghavan Dutta
Best Male Debut	Best Female Debut
Not Awarded	**Ayesha Takia – Taarzan: The Wonder Car**
Best Story	Best Screenplay
**Veer-Zaara – Aditya Chopra**	**Yuva – Mani Ratnam**
Best Dialogue	Best Background Score
**Veer-Zaara – Aditya Chopra**	**Swades – A. R. Rahman**
Best Music Director	Best Lyricist
**Main Hoon Na – Anu Malik**; Dhoom – Pritam; Hum Tum – Jatin–Lalit; Murder – Anu Malik; Swades – A. R. Rahman; Veer-Zaara – Madan Mohan	**Veer-Zaara – Javed Akhtar for "Tere Liye"**; Main Hoon Na – Javed Akhtar for "Main Hoon Na"; Swades – Javed Akhtar for "Yeh Taara Woh Taara"; Veer-Zaara – Javed Akhtar for "Aisa Des Hai Mera"; Veer-Zaara – Javed Akhtar for "Main Yahaan Hoon"
Best Male Playback Singer	Best Female Playback Singer
**Murder – Kunal Ganjawala for "Bheege Hont Tere"**; Main Hoon Na – Sonu Nigam for "Main Hoon Na"; Main Hoon Na – Sonu Nigam for "Tumse Milke"; Swades – Udit Narayan and Master Vignesh for "Yeh Taara Woh Taara"; Veer-Zaara – Sonu Nigam for "Do Pal"; Veer-Zaara – Udit Narayan for "Main Yahaan Hoon"	**Hum Tum – Alka Yagnik for "Hum Tum"**; Dhoom – Sunidhi Chauhan for "Dhoom Machale Dhoom"; Kyun! Ho Gaya Na... – Sadhana Sargam for "Aao Na"; Mujhse Shaadi Karogi – Alka Yagnik for "Lal Dupatta"; Swades – Alka Yagnik for "Saawariya"
Best Action	Best Art Direction
**Yuva – Vikram Dharma**	**Yuva – Sabu Cyril**
Best Cinematography	Best Editing
**Lakshya – Christopher Popp**	**Dhoom – Rameshwar S. Bhagat**
Best Choreography	Best Sound Design
**Lakshya – Prabhu Deva for "Main Aisa Kyun Hoon..."**	**Dhoom – Dwarak Warrier**
Power Award	Best Scene of the Year
**Shah Rukh Khan**	**Hum Tum**

=== Critics' awards ===
Best Film (Best Director)
**Dev – Govind Nihalani**; **Yuva – Mani Ratnam**
Best Actor	Best Actress
**Pankaj Kapur – Maqbool as Jahangir Khan (Abbaji)**	**Kareena Kapoor – Dev as Aaliya**

=== Special awards ===
Lifetime Achievement Award
- **Rajesh Khanna**
R. D. Burman Award
- **Kunal Ganjawala**
Power Award
- **Shah Rukh Khan**
Special Awards
- **Dilip Kumar**
- **Naushad**
- **Lata Mangeshkar**
- **Ramesh Sippy** for Sholay

== Major winners and nominees ==
- Yuva – 6/7
- Hum Tum – 5/8
- Veer-Zaara – 4/15
- Dev – 2/2
- Lakshya – 2/4
- Dhoom – 2/6
- Swades – 2/8
- Aitraaz – 1/3
- Murder – 1/2
- Taarzan: The Wonder Car – 1/1
- Main Hoon Na – 1/12
- Khakee – 0/4
- Mujhse Shaadi Karogi – 0/3

== See also ==
- Filmfare Awards
- 51st Filmfare Awards
- List of highest-grossing Bollywood films
