= Akshat Chopra =

Indian film actor, model, and dancer

- Occupations: Film actor, Model and Dancer

Akshat Chopra is an Indian film actor, model, and dancer, who was one of 36 children awarded the National Child Award in 2007 for exceptional achievement in their fields. Presently, he is an elected member of the executive committee of the Public Relations Society of India, Delhi.

== Career ==
Akshat Chopra, made his acting debut as a child artist in the 2005 BBC documentary film One Night in Bhopal. He then played a role of Vashisht Walia in 2008 film Thoda Pyaar Thoda Magic, and also dubbed the voice of Saleem in Slumdog Millionaire.

== Filmography ==
=== Films ===
Year	Movie	Role	Language	Notes
2009	Slumdog Millionaire	Salim (Dubbing)	Hindi	
2008	Thoda Pyaar Thoda Magic	Vashisht	Hindi	
2005	One Night in Bhopal (BBC)	As Akshit	English	

=== Short films ===
- Journey to Hope
- Bharosa
- Badte Kadam
- Jivancharya mein Sudhar layein

=== Television ===
- Galli Galli Sim Sim
- Jasoos Vijay (Doordarshan)
- Atmajaa
- Jang Lagi Talwar
- Dishayein
- Khel Khel mein Badlo Duniya
- Abhivyakti
- Yein Hawayein
- Kaka Nikki Time
- Rin Mera Star (Dance reality show)

== Awards and honours ==
Chopra was awarded the Kala Ratan and Bal Pratibha Samaan. He has also been honoured as a guest at the function held at Tihar Jail, and as chief guest at Zee TV's Suncity World School. Chopra also appeared in a show, Little Prince and Princess, organised by Diyadeep NGO and made a special guest appearance at Beti Bhi Apni hai walkathon on World Population Day, organised by Smile Foundation. He is an ambassador of non-governmental organization Swashrit Society, and has also been a part of Sahara India Pariwar's Ek Vote Kare Chot campaign.

Year	Award	Category	By	Notes
2002	Original Mind award	Performing arts		
2007	National Child Award	Performing Arts	Government of India	
2009	Meri Dilli Award			
