= Chak De! India (soundtrack) =

Soundtrack album by Salim–Sulaiman
- Released: 11 July 2007
- Recorded: 2007
- Studios: YRF, Mumbai
- Genre: Feature film soundtrack
- Length: 30:12
- Language: Hindi
- Label: YRF Music
- Producer: Aditya Chopra

Salim–Sulaiman chronology
Dor (2006)	Chak De! India (2007)	Aaja Nachle (2007)

Chak De! India is the soundtrack album to the 2007 film Chak De! India directed by Shimit Amin for Yash Raj Films and stars Shah Rukh Khan. The film's soundtrack featured seven songs composed by the duo Salim–Sulaiman and lyrics written by the screenwriter Jaideep Sahni. The soundtrack was released through YRF Music on 11 July 2007.

The title track song "Chak De! India," now doubles as a sports anthem in India.

== Development ==
The film's musical score and soundtrack were composed by the duo Salim–Sulaiman in their first collaboration with actor Shah Rukh Khan. The duo described composing music for the film was a difficult process, as Salim added, despite being a sports film it consisted numerous subtexts like patriotism, religious conflicts, women empowerment amongst others. Hence, it was challenging to curate the right tune for the title track. Initially, he had composed a patriotic and emotional song which Aditya Chopra had rejected, and an energetic number was composed for the film, Sulaiman rejected the tune as it lacked an emotional connect. At one point, the duo faced a roadblock which almost thought them to quit the project. Later, Sahni wrote the lines "Kuch Kariye" afterwards which he composed the tune in a blank slate and felt that the song came out very well. The duo then enlisted Sukhwinder Singh to provide vocals for the song as his vocals felt apt for it.

The song "Maula Mere" was initially composed for Dor (2006) whose tune was rejected as Nagesh Kukunoor wanted a more positive number. When Aditya and Amin watched the final edit before the theatrical release, Yash Chopra wanted a song in the climax sequence over the background score. The same evening, the duo composed and re-recorded the tune which was finished that midnight, and Sahni modified the lyrics of the song making it a positive one. The song is played in the last 20 minutes of the film in two sequences: one when Shah Rukh looks at the Indian flag after winning the match and the second when he returns to his old home.

== Reception ==
=== Critical ===
The album received positive reviews from critics. Samir Dave of PlanetBollywood.com rated the album 8/10 stars, and summarized "The album is a relief from the usual Himeshsonic-Pritammatic soundtracks that are flooding the Bollywood music scene today." Bhasker Gupta of AllMusic rated three out of five and summarized "The soundtrack may not be a sweeping success, yet it's still a feather in the cap of the duo when viewed from the perspective of their past material and the film's considerable popularity". Sumit Bhattacharya of Rediff.com described the soundtrack "as spiffy, peppy and young as a film trying to inspire a young India should be" and rated three out of five.

=== Audience ===
Upon its release 11,00,000 units of the album were sold, making it the eleventh highest selling soundtrack album of the year, according to the Indian trade website Box Office India. According to a poll by NDTV, the title track "Chak De! India" was described as the "Song of the Year 2007".

== Legacy ==
The title track "Chak De! India" has doubled as a sports anthem and is played in numerous sports events. In 2025 when the Indian women's national cricket team won the 2025 Women's Cricket World Cup, the win was juxtaposed to both Shah Rukh Khan’s portrayal of the coach, as well as to the film Chak De India itself in media outlets and social media. According to Salim Merchant, the song "almost became the sports anthem of the country, especially after India won the Cricket World Cup 2011." After India's World Cup victory, Indian team player Virat Kohli "sang 'Chak de India' to the crowd". When India defeated South Africa at the 2015 Cricket World Cup, Nitin Srivastava of the BBC noted: "MCG has erupted with "Vande Mataram" (the national song of India) and "Chak De India" (Go India!) slogans in the air."

== Track listing ==
Chak De! India (Original Motion Picture Soundtrack) track listing
No.	Title	Singers	Length
1.	"Chak De! India"	Sukhwinder Singh, Salim–Sulaiman, Marianne D'Cruz	4:43
2.	"Badal Pe Paaon Hai"	Hema Sardesai	4:05
3.	"Ek Hockey Doongi Rakh Ke"	KK, Shahrukh Khan	5:14
4.	"Bad Bad Girls"	Anushka Manchanda	3:39
5.	"Maula Mere Le Le Meri Jaan"	Salim Merchant, Krishna Beura	4:47
6.	"Hockey" (Remix)	Midival Punditz	5:17
7.	"Sattar Minute"	Shahrukh Khan	2:05
Total length:			30:12

== Accolades ==
Accolades for Chak De! India (Original Motion Picture Soundtrack)
Award	Date of ceremony (Note: Date is linked to the article about the awards held that year, wherever possible.)	Category	Recipient(s)	Result	Ref.
Filmfare Awards	16 February 2008	Best Male Playback Singer	Sukhwinder Singh ("Chak De! India")	Nominated	
International Indian Film Academy Awards	6 – 8 June 2008	Best Music Director	Salim–Sulaiman	Nominated	
International Indian Film Academy Awards	6 – 8 June 2008	Best Lyricist	Jaideep Sahni ("Chak De! India")	Nominated	
International Indian Film Academy Awards	6 – 8 June 2008	Best Male Playback Singer	Sukhwinder Singh ("Chak De! India")	Nominated	
Producers Guild Film Awards (Note: Previously known as Apsara Film & Television Producers Guild Awards.)	30 March 2008	Best Male Playback Singer	Sukhwinder Singh ("Chak De! India")	Nominated	
Screen Awards	10 January 2008	Best Background Music	Salim–Sulaiman	Nominated	
Stardust Awards	25 January 2008	New Musical Sensation (Male)	Krishna and Salim Merchant ("Maula Mere Le Le Meri Jaan")	Won	
