= Filmfare Award for Best Scene of the Year =

Annual award for Hindi films

The Filmfare Best Scene of the Year Award is decided by Sony Executives who nominate five scenes of the most popular movies of the year and telecast them on their channel two weeks prior to the event.

The winner is revealed at the annual Filmfare Awards.

Here is the list of the award winners.

| Year | Movie | Scene |
|---|---|---|
| 2012 | The Dirty Picture | Films run on only three reasons: Entertainment, entertainment and entertainment |
| 2011 | Golmaal 3 | Conflict between the brothers when parents watching TV |
| 2009 | Rab Ne Bana Di Jodi | First breakfast flower scene |
| 2005 | Hum Tum | Late night snack scene |
| 2004 | Kal Ho Naa Ho | Diary scene |
| 2003 | Devdas | Confrontation scene between Parvati and Chandramukhi |
| 2002 | Kabhi Khushi Kabhie Gham | Family reunion at the Blue Water Mall |
| 2001 | Mohabbatein | Raj and Narayan confrontation regarding Vicky, Sameer and Karan |
| 2000 | Vaastav: The Reality | Climax scene where Raghu's mother kills him |
| 1999 | Ghulam | Race against train Scene |

== See also ==
- Filmfare Award
- Bollywood
- Cinema of India
