= Mujhse Dosti Karoge! =

2002 Indian film by Kunal Kohli

- Theatrical release poster
- Directed by: Kunal Kohli
- Written by: Kunal Kohli
- Produced by: Yash Chopra
- Starring: Hrithik Roshan; Rani Mukerji; Kareena Kapoor; Uday Chopra
- Cinematography: Gopal Shah
- Edited by: Ritesh Soni; V. Karnik
- Music by: Songs: Rahul Sharma; Score: Babloo Chakravorty
- Production company: Yash Raj Films
- Distributed by: Yash Raj Films
- Release date: 9 August 2002
- Running time: 148 minutes
- Country: India
- Language: Hindi
- Box office: ₹30.53 crore

Mujhse Dosti Karoge! (transl. Will You Be My Friend!) is a 2002 Indian Hindi-language romantic comedy drama film written and directed by Kunal Kohli in his directorial debut, and produced by Yash Chopra under the Yash Raj Films banner. The film stars Hrithik Roshan, Rani Mukerji, Kareena Kapoor, and Uday Chopra. Set across London and India, the narrative centers on a love triangle between three childhood friends. It marked Kohli's first collaboration with Yash Raj Films as a director, and the only on-screen pairing of Roshan and Mukerji, despite both (along with Kapoor) appearing in Kabhi Khushi Kabhie Gham... (2001).

Principal photography took place in the United Kingdom and India. The music was composed by Rahul Sharma, with lyrics written by Anand Bakshi. The soundtrack incorporated both original compositions and Bollywood classics from the 1970s and 1980s.

Mujhse Dosti Karoge! was released on 9 August 2002 and received mixed reviews from critics, with praise for its music and performances, but criticism for its narrative structure. The film was a commercial failure, though it ranked as the sixth highest-grossing Hindi film of the year, with a worldwide gross of ₹336.1 million (US$4 million).

== Plot ==
Raj Khanna (Hrithik Roshan), Tina Kapoor (Kareena Kapoor), and Pooja Sahani (Rani Mukerji) are childhood friends. Raj harbors a crush on Tina, while Pooja secretly loves Raj. When Raj's family moves to London, he asks Tina to stay in touch with him through email. Unwilling to take on the responsibility, Tina asks Pooja to write the emails on her behalf. Pooja agrees and begins corresponding with Raj while pretending to be Tina. Over time, Raj develops a deep emotional bond with the girl he believes to be Tina.

Fifteen years later, Raj returns to India hoping to reunite with the girl he fell in love with through their messages. Having never exchanged photographs, he assumes he will recognize her immediately. Upon meeting Tina, he mistakenly believes she is the one who wrote to him, and his affection shifts toward her. Tina, aware of the misunderstanding, accepts his feelings, and their families arrange their engagement. Pooja, knowing the truth but unwilling to hurt either of them, suppresses her own feelings.

Later in London, Raj takes Pooja to a church where she unknowingly hums a melody he had once composed for his pen pal. Realizing that Pooja is the person with whom he had been corresponding all those years, Raj confronts her and confesses that he loves her. Although Pooja reciprocates his feelings, she chooses to sacrifice her happiness after learning that Tina's father has died and that Tina relies on Raj for emotional support. Raj reluctantly agrees to proceed with the marriage to Tina, on the condition that Pooja promises to marry someone else on the same day.

During the wedding celebrations in London, Raj's friend Rohan expresses interest in Pooja, and she agrees to marry him. On the wedding day, however, Tina notices the lingering affection between Raj and Pooja and realizes the truth about their relationship. Acknowledging that Raj and Pooja truly love each other, Tina calls off the wedding and encourages them to be together. Raj and Pooja are finally united.

== Cast ==
The cast is as follows:

- Hrithik Roshan as Raj Khanna
  - Athit Naik as Young Raj Khanna
- Rani Mukerji as Pooja Sahani Khanna
  - Nandini Seth as Young Pooja Sahani
- Kareena Kapoor as Tina Kapoor
  - Barkha Singh as young Tina Kapoor
- Uday Chopra as Rohan Verma
- Satish Shah as Mr. Sahani: Pooja's father
- Himani Shivpuri as Mrs. Sahani: Pooja's mother
- Kiran Kumar as Mr. Khanna: Raj's father
- Smita Jaykar as Mrs. Khanna: Raj's mother
- Sachin Khedekar as Mr. Kapoor: Tina's father
- Parikshat Sahni as Mr. Verma: Rohan's father
- Maya Alagh as Mrs. Verma: Rohan's mother
- Raja Vaid as Ronnie Mendonca: Raj's friend

== Production ==
=== Development ===
Mujhse Dosti Karoge! marked the directorial debut of Kunal Kohli, who previously worked in advertising and television. While the film was likened to the 1996 American romantic comedy The Truth About Cats & Dogs, Kohli clarified that the inspiration was limited to the mistaken identity angle and that "not one scene from it is the same." Neil Nitin Mukesh worked as an assistant director for the film.

=== Casting ===
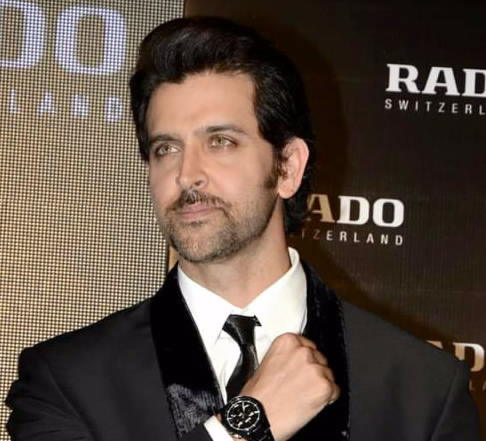
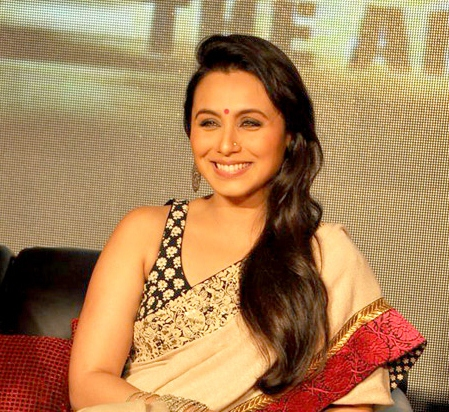
Mujhse Dosti Karoge! is the only collaboration between Hrithik Roshan and Rani Mukerji to date.

The film featured Hrithik Roshan, Rani Mukerji, and Kareena Kapoor in the lead roles. It marked Roshan and Kapoor's third collaboration following Yaadein (2001) and Kabhi Khushi Kabhie Gham... (2001). Uday Chopra made a special appearance as Rohan Verma, while Barkha Singh portrayed the younger version of Tina Kapoor.

Rani Mukerji described the film as a “privilege” and recalled that working on it was an enjoyable experience due to her rapport with Roshan. Roshan likened the role to his earlier work in Kaho Naa... Pyaar Hai (2000).

Kareena Kapoor took on the role of Tina Kapoor, a vibrant and glamorous character. Though initially hesitant to accept a secondary role, she was persuaded by Kohli and producer Aditya Chopra. Kapoor saw the role as unconventional, stating, “I play a loser, yet emerge the winner,” and considered it a performance her fans would enjoy.

=== Filming ===
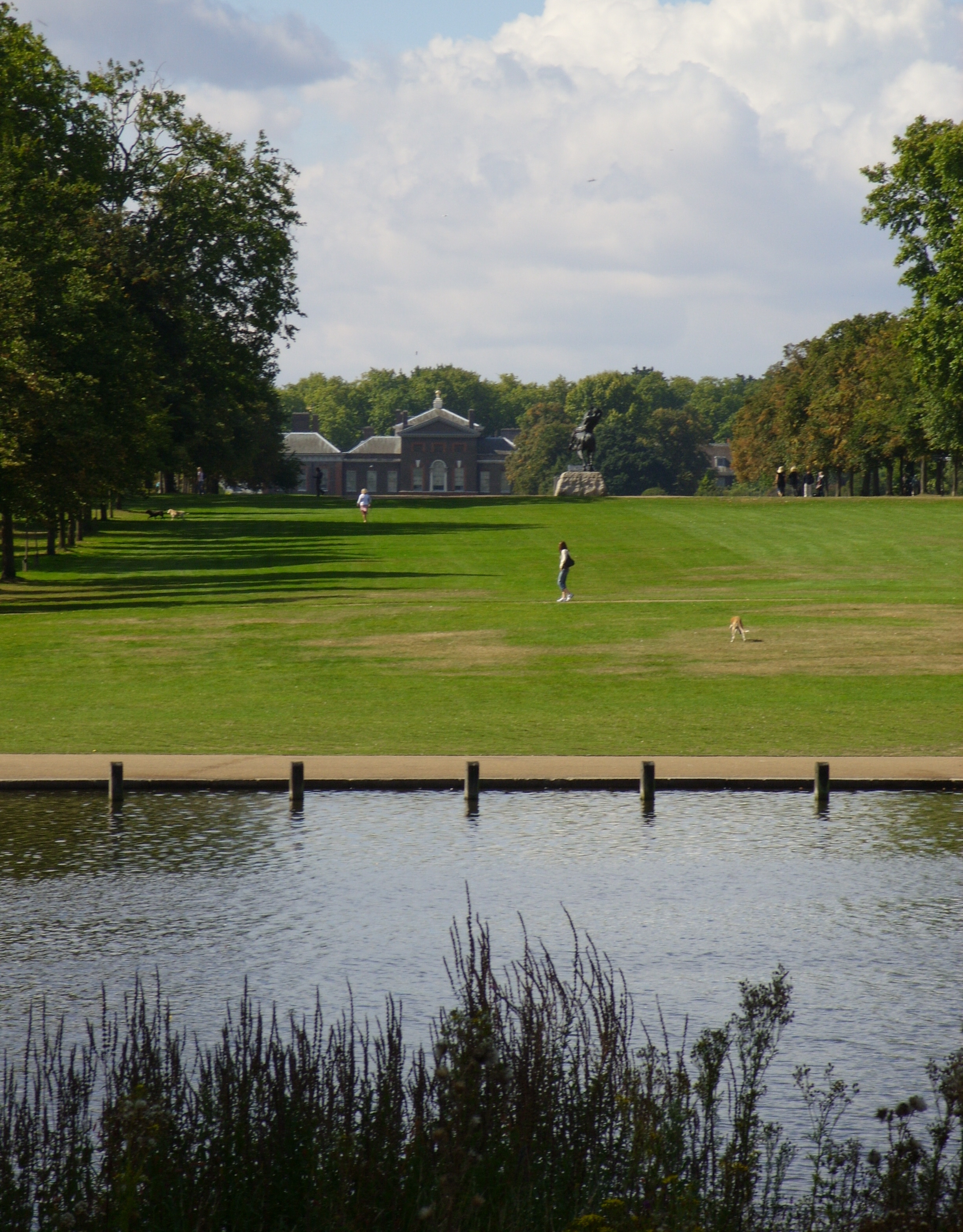
A portion of the film was shot at the Kensington Gardens

Principal photography was conducted across several domestic and international locations, including Shimla, Manali, Mumbai, London, and]. Choreography for the film's musical sequences was handled by Ahmed Khan, while costumes were designed by Manish Malhotra and Rocky Star. Sharmishta Roy served as the film's production designer.

== Soundtrack ==
Mujhse Dosti Karoge!

Soundtrack album by Rahul Sharma
- Released: 12 June 2002
- Genre: Feature film soundtrack
- Length: 31:20
- Labels: YRF Music (digital); Saregama (physical)
- Producer: Yash Chopra

Singles from Mujhse Dosti Karoge!
- 1. "Andekhi Anjaani" Released: 12 June 2002; 2. "Saanwali Si Ek Ladki" Released: 12 June 2002

The soundtrack for Mujhse Dosti Karoge! was composed by Rahul Sharma, marking his debut as a film composer. Sharma accepted the offer in April 2001 while on a concert tour with his father, santoor maestro Shivkumar Sharma. He described the music as "young and fresh,". The score incorporated traditional instruments such as the santoor and flute, along with an orchestral arrangement featuring sixty violinists for the background score.

The lyrics were written by Anand Bakshi, with vocals provided by Alisha Chinai, Alka Yagnik, Asha Bhosle, Lata Mangeshkar, Udit Narayan, and Sonu Nigam. Reflecting on the project in later interviews, Sharma described it as both a "great" and "learning" experience. The soundtrack was released on 12 June 2002 under the Saregama label.

Mujhse Dosti Karoge (Original Motion Picture Soundtrack)
No.	Title	Singer(s)	Length
1.	"Andekhi Anjaani"	Lata Mangeshkar, Udit Narayan	6:17
2.	"Jaane Dil Mein" (Part 1)	Lata Mangeshkar, Sonu Nigam	5:45
3.	"Saanwali Si Ek Ladki"	Udit Narayan	4:05
4.	"Oh My Darling"	Alisha Chinai, Sonu Nigam	6:07
5.	"Mujhse Dosti Karoge!"	Alka Yagnik, Asha Bhosle, Udit Narayan	5:01
6.	"Jaane Dil Mein" (Part 2)	Lata Mangeshkar, Sonu Nigam	2:48
7.	"Terrific Tina" (Instrumental)		1:17
8.	"The Medley"	Lata Mangeshkar, Udit Narayan, Sonu Nigam, Pamela Chopra	12:05
Total length:			43:25

=== Reception ===
The soundtrack for Mujhse Dosti Karoge! received mixed-to-positive reviews from music critics. Narendra Kusnur of Mid-Day described the music as "hummable" and praised composer Rahul Sharma's orchestration and "innovative use of guitars". However, he also noted that some tracks followed a predictable pattern commonly associated with the Yash Raj Films banner.

Joginder Tuteja of Bollywood Hungama commended Sharma's debut effort, stating that he "does a superb job in churning out a number of melodies in one single package." The Hindu noted the soundtrack's fusion of Indian and Western musical elements.

=== Charts and sales ===
According to Box Office India, the soundtrack sold approximately 1.2 million units and ranked as the eleventh highest-selling Hindi film album of 2002.

== Release ==
Mujhse Dosti Karoge! was released theatrically on 9 August 2002. It premiered on 7 November 2002 on Zee Cinema. The DVD version was released on 11 November 2003 as a single-disc edition.

== Reception ==
=== Box office ===
On its opening day in India, Mujhse Dosti Karoge! earned ₹11.6 million (US$140,000). It went on to collect ₹211 million (US$2.5 million) domestically and an additional US$2.6 million from overseas markets. The film's total worldwide gross was estimated at ₹336.1 million (US$4.0 million), with Box Office India classifying its commercial performance as a "flop". Despite this, it ranked as the sixth highest-grossing Hindi film of the year, and remained among the top Indian earners of the decade in both domestic and international territories.

=== Critical response ===
Mujhse Dosti Karoge! received mixed reviews from critics. While the performances of the lead actors were generally praised, the narrative was criticized for being predictable and the soundtrack was regarded as underwhelming.

Taran Adarsh of Bollywood Hungama gave the film 1 out of 5 stars, stating that it "clearly belongs to Rani Mukerji, who has the meatiest role comparatively", and described her performance as "superb." Subhash K. Jha, in a 2.5-star review, observed that Kunal Kohli made a visible effort to create his own take on the traditional Yash Chopra style. Derek Elley of Variety felt that Kapoor "largely reprises her pampered bimbo" role from Kabhi Khushi Kabhie Gham (2001), but praised Hrithik Roshan's dancing abilities. Manish Gajjar of the BBC commented that Kareena Kapoor showed a strong sense for comedy and visually reminded audiences of her earlier character "Poo".

In Outlook, Namrata Joshi rated the film 1 star, calling it "avoidable" and criticized Roshan's performance as "a poor parody of himself". Sukanya Verma of Rediff.com was more positive, describing Kohli as an "impressive" first-time director who maintained a tight grip on the screenplay and pacing. Madhureeta Mukherjee of The Times of India remarked that Mukerji "scores almost full marks for her heart-rending performance". Omar Ahmed of Empire credited Mukerji with "saving" the film. Khalid Mohammed noted that while Kapoor was "reliably spry and saucy", she risked typecasting by repeating similar roles. S. Ramachandran of Mid-Day wrote that the film's strength lay in its performances, particularly Roshan's and Mukerji's, despite its flaws. Stardust acknowledged Kohli's sensitive handling of certain scenes but felt the film overall lacked originality.

== Accolades ==
List of accolades received by Saathiya
Award	Date of ceremony (Note: Date is linked to the article about the awards held that year, wherever possible.)	Category	Recipient(s)	Result	Ref.
Bollywood Movie Awards	3 May 2003	Best Costume Designer	Manish Malhotra	Nominated	
International Indian Film Academy Awards	15–17 May 2003	Best Supporting Actress	Kareena Kapoor	Nominated	

== Legacy ==
In 2023, Mujhse Dosti Karoge! was featured in the Netflix docu-series The Romantics, as part of the segment titled "The New Guard", which explored the evolution of Yash Raj Films and its newer generation of filmmakers. Earlier, the song "Andekhi Anjaani" from the film was reused in a sequence of Kohli's 2004 romantic comedy Hum Tum, which also starred Mukerji. The film was also included at the 93rd position in Time Out's list of "The 100 Best Bollywood Movies".

== See also ==
- List of highest-grossing Bollywood films
- List of Hindi films of 2002
