= Yahaan Sabki Lagi Hai =

Indian film

- Theatrical release poster
- Directed by: Satavisha Bose; Cyrus R. Khambhata
- Written by: Satavisha Bose; Cyrus R. Khambhata
- Produced by: Executive Producer; Udayyan Raathore; Associate Producer; Abhay Raj Kanwar
- Starring: Varun Thakur; Eden Shyodhi; Heerok Das
- Cinematography: Suresh Rajan
- Edited by: Cyrus Khambata
- Music by: Pankaj Awasthi
- Production company: Vibrant Works
- Distributed by: Karan Raj Kanwar (Inderjit Films)
- Release date: 27 March 2015
- Running time: 102 minutes
- Country: India
- Language: Hindi

Yahaan Sabki Lagi Hai, also known as Everybody Gets Screwed Here in English, is a 2015 Indian Hindi-language film written and directed by Satavisha Bose and Cyrus R. Khambhata, featuring Varun Thakur, Eden Shyodhi, Heerok Das, and Teeshay Shah. The film was released in India on March 27, 2015. It focuses on the experiences of urban, English-speaking youth in India, presented through an allegorical narrative.

== Plot ==
The film explores class systems and socio-economic disparities among India's urban youth, examining how their beliefs and choices affect their social and emotional well-being.

== Cast ==
- Varun Thakur as Bharat
- Eden Shyodhi as Kesang
- Heerok Das as Chandu
- Teeshay Shah as Shanti

== Soundtrack ==
Yahaan Sabki Lagi Hai

Soundtrack album by Pankaj Awasthi
- Released: 7 March 2015
- Genre: Feature film soundtrack
- Length: 30:46
- Language: Hindi
- Labels: Inderjit Media & Entertainment

The soundtrack of Yahaan Sabki Lagi Hai consists of nine tracks composed by Pankaj Awasthi.

Tracklist
No.	Title	Lyrics	Singer(s)	Length
1.	"Dard"	M.K. Mishra	Pankaj Awasthi	04:30
2.	"Bekaid"	Neeraj Rajawat	Pankaj Awasthi, Neeraj Rajawat, Hamsika Iyer & Suraj Jagan	02:32
3.	"Patli Gali"	Neeraj Rajawat	Pankaj Awasthi, KR$NA	04:12
4.	"Halla"	Neeraj Rajawat	Suraj Jagan	01:04
5.	"Kahin Na Kahin"	Neeraj Rajawat	Hamsika Iyer	02:45
6.	"Dard" (Remix)	Neeraj Rajawat	Pankaj Awasthi & Apeksha Dandekar	03:09
7.	"Yahaan Sabki Lagi Hai" (Instrumental)			05:12
8.	"Chandu's Plan" (Instrumental)			02:46
9.	"Night To Morning" (Instrumental)			04:36
Total length:				30:46

== Critical reception ==
Deborah Young of The Hollywood Reporter praised the film's acting and dialogue, calling it "an energetic, off-beat young road movie poised between drama and farce." Saibal Chatterjee of NDTV gave the film 3 out of 5 stars, writing that Yahaan Sabki Lagi Hai explores how people are "screwed up as much by the system as by their own follies," but noting that the film's ultimate impact is less bleak than the title suggests. Renuka Vyavahare of The Times of India praised the acting but criticized the film overall, giving it a rating of 1.5 out of 5 stars. Kusumita Das of Deccan Chronicle gave the film 1.5 out of 5 stars, stating that the filmmakers "had an idea, but perhaps didn’t know how best to go about executing it," and that the "story has pace but faltered when it comes to substance."
