= Kunal Kohli =

Indian film director

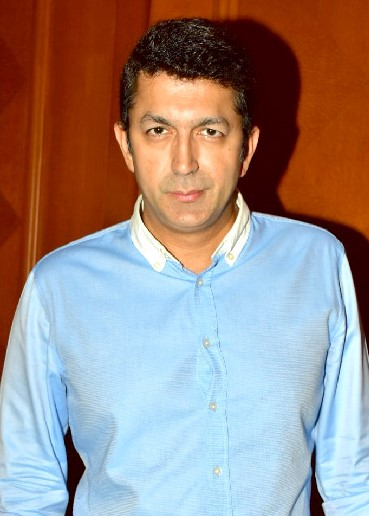
- Kohli at India International Film Tourism Conclave 2018
- Born: 28 October 1969 (age 56)
- Occupations: Director, screenwriter, producer, actor
- Spouse: Ravina Kohli
- Children: 1 (daughter)
- Relatives: David Dhawan (maternal uncle); Varun Dhawan (cousin); Rohit Dhawan (cousin)

Kunal Kohli is an Indian film director, producer, writer and actor in Bollywood. He is best known for directing the romantic comedy Hum Tum (2004), which won him the Filmfare Award for Best Director, and the romantic thriller Fanaa (2006).

He also owns the production house Kunal Kohli Productions, which produced the fantasy comedy-drama Thoda Pyaar Thoda Magic (2008), the romantic comedy-drama Break Ke Baad (2010), the romantic comedy Teri Meri Kahaani (2012) and the romance Phir Se... (2018).

== Career ==
=== Initial work (1990s) ===
Kohli started out as a film critic in the late 1990s and hosted the show Chalo Cinema on EL TV. He also directed some music videos: Bally Sagoo's "Mera Laung Gawacha", Kamaal Khan's "Jaana", Bali Brahmbhatt's "Tere Bin Jeena Nahin", Shiamak Davar's "Jaane Kisne", Hema Sardesai's "Bole Humse Kuch Na Gori" and Rajshri Music's "Yeh Hai Prem", a song for Alisha Chinoy with Milind Soman. He directed about 24 music videos before moving to TV and films. He made his TV directorial debut with the television series Trikon.

=== Directorial debut and breakthrough with Yash Raj Films (2002-2008) ===
Kohli made his mainstream directorial debut with the Yash Raj Films-produced coming-of-age romantic comedy Mujhse Dosti Karoge! (2002), starring Rani Mukherji, Hrithik Roshan and Kareena Kapoor in lead roles. Despite much hype due to its A-list star-cast, the film failed to attract an audience, grossing ₹336.1 million (US$4.2 million), emerging as a commercial failure at the box-office; however, it ranked as the sixth highest-grossing Hindi film of the year. It opened to mixed-to-negative reviews from critics upon release, receiving sharp criticism for its story and screenplay.

His second directorial venture was the romantic comedy Hum Tum (2004), starring Mukherji alongside Saif Ali Khan. The film received positive reviews from critics upon release, and emerged as a major commercial success at the box-office, ranking as the sixth highest-grossing Hindi film of the year, thus proving to be a breakthrough for him. It earned Kohli the Filmfare Award for Best Director, which he won against his mentor Yash Chopra, who was nominated for the epic love saga Veer-Zaara (2004).

He next directed the romantic thriller Fanaa (2006), starring Aamir Khan and Kajol in lead roles. The film marked the comeback of Kajol after a 5-year break from the industry after Kabhi Khushi Kabhie Gham (2001), and also the end of Kohli's 3-film deal with Yash Raj Films. It also proved to be controversial and was banned in the state of Gujarat due to protests against Khan for his comments criticizing the Gujarat government. Despite controversy, Fanaa opened to positive reviews from critics upon release, and emerged as a major commercial success at the box-office, grossing over ₹1.03 billion, and ranked as the sixth highest-grossing Hindi film of the year.

Kohli then started his own production company, Kunal Kohli Productions, whose first production venture was Kohli's fantasy comedy-drama Thoda Pyaar Thoda Magic (2008), co-produced by Yash Raj Films. The film starred Mukherji and Saif Ali Khan in lead roles, marking his third collaboration with Mukherji, and second with Saif. Unlike Kohli's two previous ventures, it opened to mixed reviews, with criticism directed towards its story and screenplay, and emerged as a commercial failure at the box-office.

=== Career fluctuations (2010-2018) ===
Kohli next produced the romantic comedy-drama Break Ke Baad (2010), which was directed by Danish Aslam and starred Deepika Padukone and Imran Khan in lead roles. A mobile video game platformer based on the film was released by Jump Games. The film opened to mixed-to-positive reviews from critics upon release; however, it emerged as an underwhelming commercial success at the box-office. Over the years, the film has achieved cult status due to its novel concept, themes and storyline.

His next directorial venture was the romantic comedy Teri Meri Kahaani (2012), starring Shahid Kapoor and Priyanka Chopra in triple roles, portraying three couples from three different eras – in 1910 Sargodha, in 1960 Mumbai, and 2012 London. Kohli conceived the film based on the idea of soulmates, showing the strength of love beyond generations by having the same two actors portray all three couples without using a reincarnation theme. Teri Meri Kahaani opened to mixed-to-positive reviews upon release, with particular praise for its storyline and themes; however, like his previous venture Break Ke Baad, it emerged as an underwhelming commercial success at the box-office.

Kohli made his acting debut in his next directorial venture, the romance Phir Se... (2018), alongside debutante Jennifer Winget. The web film told the story of a separated couple living in London, trying to come to terms with the consequences of their split. Initially slated to release in 2015, it was shelved indefinitely due to alleged plagiarism controversies. However, Netflix later bought the worldwide rights to the film and released it on their digital platform in 2018. Phir Se... received mixed-to-positive reviews from critics upon release, with praise for its bold storyline, and the performance and chemistry of the lead pair.

=== Later career (2018-present) ===
Kohli next directed the romantic comedy Next Enti? (2018), starring Tamannaah, Sundeep Kishan and Navdeep in lead roles, which marked his Telugu directorial debut. The film opened to mixed-to-negative reviews from critics upon release, and emerged as a commercial failure at the box-office.

His next directorial venture was the spy thriller Lahore Confidential (2021) starring Richa Chadha, Arunoday Singh and Karishma Tanna in lead roles, which released on ZEE5. A sequel to London Confidential (2020) directed by Kanwal Sethi, the film opened to negative reviews from critics upon release.

Kohli has a three film contract with Reliance Big Pictures involving financing, distribution and marketing. This contract is estimated to be worth Rs 1.50 billion.

== Television ==
Kohli judged the popular reality dance TV show Nach Baliye's second season for Star Plus in 2005. He also judged the children's reality show on Sony TV, Chota Packet Bada Dhamaka in 2005. In April 2014, it was reported that he would be the judge on NDTV's talent hunt show Ticket to Bollywood.

== Personal life ==
Kohli is married to Ravina Kohli, who was the director of Koffee with Karan, and headed Yash Raj TV. They have a daughter, Radha who they adopted. His maternal uncle is director David Dhawan, and his cousins are actor Varun Dhawan, and director, Rohit Dhawan, both of whom are David's sons. His maternal aunt died of the COVID-19 in May 2020.

== Filmography ==
=== Films ===
Year	Film	Director	Producer	Writer	Actor	Notes
2002	Mujhse Dosti Karoge!	Yes	No	Yes	No	Directorial debut
2004	Hum Tum	Yes	No	Yes	No	Won – Filmfare Award for Best Director
2006	Fanaa	Yes	No	Yes	No	
2008	Thoda Pyaar Thoda Magic	Yes	Yes	Yes	No	
2010	Break Ke Baad	No	Yes	No	No	
2012	Teri Meri Kahaani	Yes	Yes	Yes	No	
2018	Phir Se...	Yes	No	No	Yes	Acting debut
2018	Next Enti?	Yes	No	Yes	No	Telugu directorial debut
2021	Lahore Confidential	Yes	No	No	No	
2025	Bobby Aur Rishi Ki Love Story	Yes	No	Yes	No	

=== Television ===
- Nach Baliye 2 (judge)
- Chota Packet Bada Dhamaka (judge)
- Stardust Awards (host)
- Chalo Cinema (host)
- Ticket to Bollywood (judge)
- Ramyug (director)

=== Music videos ===
Year	Album	Music Video
1998	Yeh Hai Prem	"Yeh Hai Prem Trilogy"
