= London Confidential =

- Promotional poster
- Directed by: Kanwal Sethi
- Written by: S. Hussain Zaidi; Akshay Singh; Prateek Payodhi
- Produced by: Mohit Chhabra; Ajay Rai
- Starring: Mouni Roy; Purab Kohli; Kulraj Randhawa; Sagar Arya
- Cinematography: Ewan Mulligan
- Edited by: Parikshhit Jha
- Music by: Sanket Naik
- Production company: JAR Pictures
- Distributed by: ZEE5
- Release date: 18 September 2020
- Running time: 77 minutes
- Country: India
- Language: Hindi

London Confidential is an Indian Hindi-language spy thriller film which premiered on ZEE5 on 18 September 2020. The film is directed by Kanwal Sethi and produced by Mohit Chhabra and Ajay Rai. It is created by S. Hussain Zaidi and stars Mouni Roy and Purab Kohli. The film is about R&AW agents in London investigating China's role in the pandemic with a ruthless mole in their midst. A Sequel titled Lahore Confidential was released on ZEE5 in 2021.

== Plot ==
R&AW officials stationed in London have gathered strong evidence through their sources which indicate the involvement of Chinese Communist party in the spread of the virus and are very close to getting the final evidence. However, Chinese authorities get wind of this through a mole in the Indian embassy. In order to have a low-key presence the R&AW uses a grocery store as their outpost to execute and coordinate operations.

== Cast ==
- Mouni Roy as Uma Kulkarni
- Purab Kohli as Arjun Manish Kumar
- Kulraj Randhawa as Nirupama Das
- Sagar Arya as Sharad
- Parvessh Rana as Azaad
- Jas Binag as Jeevan
- Diljohn Singh as Biren Ghosh
- Kiren jogi as Mrs Anju Mehta
- Roxane Cabassut as Angelie
- Laura fontamara as Dancer girl
- Dandan Liu as Yuki
- Mohan Kapoor as RK Goyal, Jt. Secretary
- Sharad Kelkar as Tanmay Kulkarni (Cameo)

== Release ==
London Confidential was premiered on ZEE5 on 18 September 2020.

== Reception ==
Samrudhi Ghosh from Hindustan Times stated, “London Confidential is a crisp espionage thriller, at one hour and 14 minutes, but the trite and predictable climax does not live up to the interesting premise. India Today stated, “The screenplay is gripping and Kanwal Sethi’s direction does justice to it. The cinematography captures the London cityscape in an interesting hue. The editing is crisp and has ensured there are no dull moments in the film. All-in-all, ‘London Confidential’ is worth the full 1 hour and 17 minutes of your time”. Scroll.in mentioned, “The film is based on a concept by tireless conspiracy thriller churner S Hussain Zaidi. Written by Akshay Singh and Prateek Payodhi and directed by Kanwal Sethi, London Confidential doesn't indulge in much Chinese-bashing. The focus is on sending Uma and Arjun on a wild-goose chase before they stumble upon the truth that is staring them in the face.
