= Uday Chopra =

Indian actor (born 1973)

- Chopra in 2012
- Born: 5 January 1973 (age 53); Mumbai, Maharashtra, India
- Occupations: Actor; producer
- Years active: 1993–present
- Parent(s): Yash Chopra; Pamela Chopra
- Relatives: Chopra family

Uday Raj Chopra (born 5 January 1973) is an Indian producer and former actor. He is the son of filmmaker Yash Chopra. He made his acting debut in the 2000 film Mohabbatein and featured in several other films including Mere Yaar Ki Shaadi Hai (2002), Dhoom (2004), Dhoom 2 (2006) and Dhoom 3 (2013).

== Early life ==
He is the son of director Yash Chopra and Pamela Chopra. His brother is filmmaker Aditya Chopra and his sister-in-law is the actress Rani Mukerji. He is the first cousin of filmmakers Ravi Chopra and Karan Johar. Chopra worked as an assistant director on a number of his father's and brother's films under the Yash Raj Films banner.

In July 2012, Chopra founded his own company, "Yomics", which creates comics based on Yash Raj Films.

== Career ==
In 1994, Chopra produced Yeh Dillagi starring Akshay Kumar, Kajol and Saif Ali Khan. He made his acting debut in Mohabbatein (2000). Chopra had mostly acted in films under his father's production house.

He starred in the action thriller Dhoom and in its sequels Dhoom 2 and Dhoom 3, released in 2006 and 2013 respectively. Although praised for his performance as Ali Akbar Fateh Khan in the first installment, a role he reprised in both the sequels, the sequels were met with mixed reviews.

In 2011, he went to Los Angeles to join a production work shop in UCLA.

In 2014, Chopra produced two films. Grace of Monaco was the biography film about Grace Kelly starring Nicole Kidman in the leading role. He produced the Hollywood film The Longest Week, a comedy drama starring Olivia Wilde and Jason Bateman. It is the first project of Yash Raj Film's subsidiary Hollywood production house YRF Entertainment.

== Personal life ==
Chopra began dating actress Tanishaa Mukerji during the filming of Neal 'n' Nikki (2005). They broke up after two years.

Chopra began dating Nargis Fakhri in 2013. The relationship attracted substantial media coverage in India and they speculated on an impending marriage. However, the couple broke up towards the end of 2017.

Chopra openly said he is an atheist.

== Filmography ==
=== Film ===
As an actor

Year	Title	Role	Notes
1995	Dilwale Dulhaniya Le Jayenge	Biker in front of Simran	Uncredited cameo
2000	Mohabbatein	Vikram Kapoor	
2002	Mere Yaar Ki Shaadi Hai	Sanjay Malhotra	
2002	Mujhse Dosti Karoge!	Rohan Verma	
2003	Supari	Aryan Pandit	
2003	Kal Ho Naa Ho	Day 6 Announcer	Cameo appearance
2004	Charas: A Joint Operation	Ashraf	
2004	Dhoom	Ali Akbar Fateh Khan	
2005	Neal 'n' Nikki	Gurneal 'Neal' Ahluwalia	
2006	Dhoom 2	Ali Akbar Fateh Khan	
2010	Pyaar Impossible	Abhay Sharma	
2013	Dhoom 3	Ali Akbar Fateh Khan	Final film

As producer and writer

Year	Title	Role	Notes
1994	Yeh Dillagi	Producer	
2010	Pyaar Impossible	Producer and screenwriter	
2014	Grace of Monaco	Producer	
2014	The Longest Week	Producer	
2026	Alpha	Story writer	

Other crew positions

Year	Title	Role	Notes
1991	Lamhe	Assistant director	
1993	Parampara	Assistant director	
1993	Darr	Assistant director	
1995	Dilwale Dulhaniya Le Jayenge	Assistant director	
1997	Dil To Pagal Hai	Assistant director	
2000	Mohabbatein	Associate producer	
2002	Mere Yaar Ki Shaadi Hai	Associate producer	
2002	Mujhse Dosti Karoge!	Associate producer	
2004	Veer-Zaara	Associate producer	

=== Television ===
Year	Title	Role	Notes
2023	The Romantics	Himself	Documentary; also executive producer
2023	The Railway Men	—N/a	Executive producer
2025	Mandala Murders	—N/a	Executive producer

== Awards and nominations ==
- Nominated - Primetime Emmy Award for Outstanding Television Movie for the Grace of Monaco
