= Anusha Mani =

Indian female playback singer (born 1985)

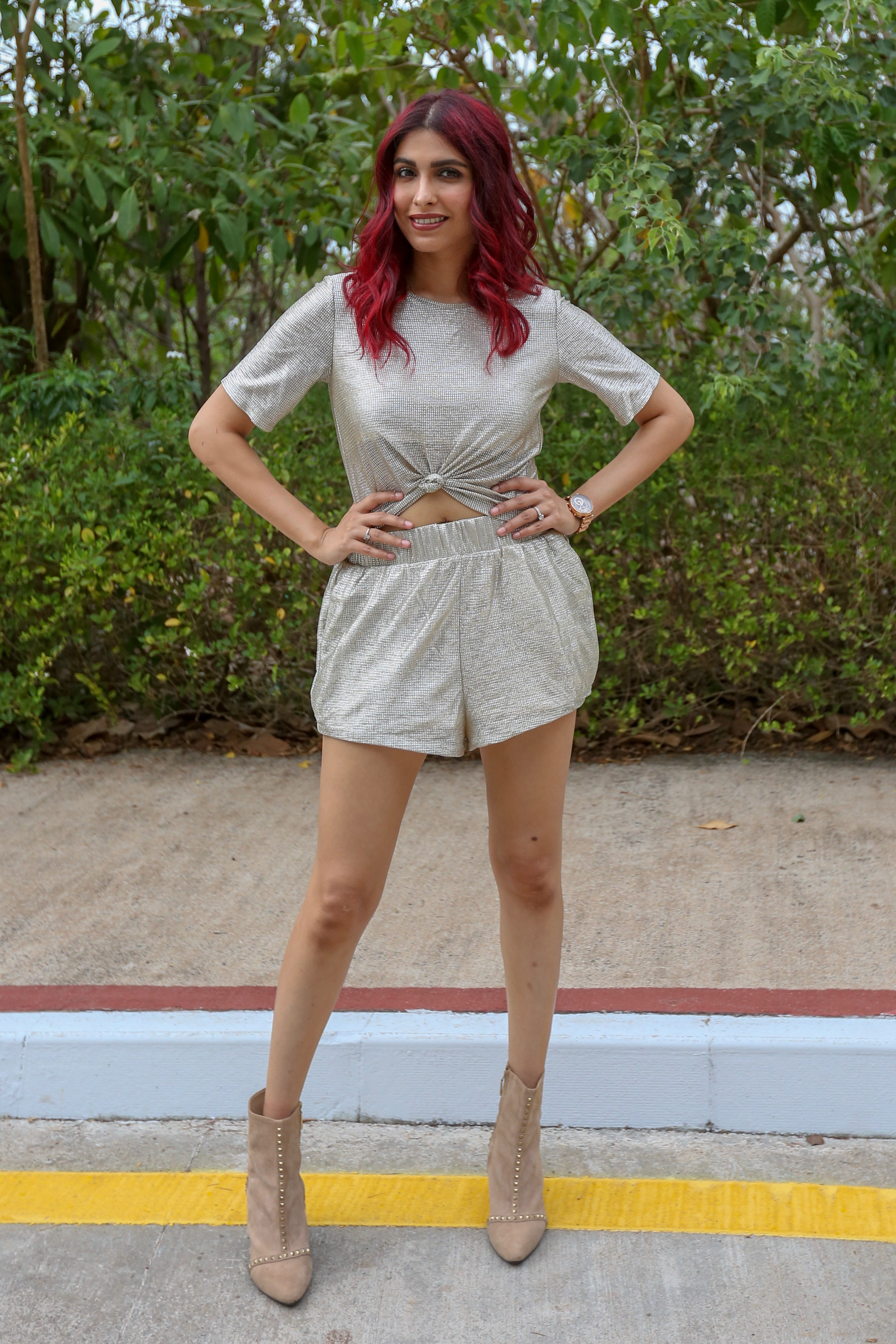

Background information
- Born: 29 March 1985 (age 40); Mumbai, Maharashtra, India
- Genres: Playback Singer
- Occupation: Singer
- Instrument: Vocalist
- Years active: 2007–present

Anusha Mani (born 29 March 1985) is an Indian playback singer known for her works in Indian films.

== Early and personal life ==
Born to a musically inclined family, she learnt Carnatic music at a young age. Having originally sung in Gujarati plays, she met Amit Trivedi with whom she made a music album, which was never released.

She is married to singer-composer Sangeet Haldipur, the son of Amar Haldipur and brother of Siddharth Haldipur.

== Career ==
In 2007, music composers Shankar–Ehsaan–Loy offered her the chance to sing the track Dhoka from Johnny Gaddaar after listening to an album she had appeared on. She has worked in about six albums with the trio since then. She had also sung and written the track Dil Mein Jaagi from the Dev.D, which won the National Film Award for Best Music Direction. She appeared on the TV show MTV Angles of Rock where she starred alongside singers Shalmali Kholgade, Jasmine Sandlas and Akasa Singh. In 2021, Mani featured in a unique film focused on the plight of stray animals.

== Filmography ==
- Aishwarya (2006)
- Johnny Gaddaar (2007)
- Thoda Pyaar Thoda Magic (2008)
- Dev.D (2009)
- Sikandar (2009)
- Hum Tum Aur Ghost (2010)
- Tere Bin Laden (2010)
- Aisha (2010)
- Game (2011)
- Don 2: The King is Back (2011)
- Chennai Express (2013)
- Shaandaar (2015)
- Ruler (2019)
- War (2019)
- Desi Magic (2021)
- Bhediya (2022) – Telugu (D)
- Bhediya (2022) – Tamil (D)
- Tiger 3 (2023)
