= Kathaa Animations =

Indian animation studio

Kathaa Animations was an Indian animation studio founded by Prakash Nambiar in 2001. It was acquired by American company Animations Dimensions for developing Intellectual Property in December, 2006. It was best known for the creation of the animated characters Hum Tum for the film Hum Tum. Hum Tum was one of the most successful animated characters to be used in mainstream Bollywood film.

== History ==
=== Early history ===
Kathaa Animations was founded in 2001 by Prakash Nambiar. Targeted at creating original content in the nascent Indian animation industry, the company began its operations in a shared space in an industrial workshop. Initially, the company developed multimedia presentations and corporate films. It developed many promotional materials for Yash Raj Films, the biggest and most successful Indian film production house. During this association with YRF, Kathaa was invited to pitch for their upcoming film with animated characters Hum Tum. The movie became one of the most successful Bollywood films and got critical acclaim for its animation and cartoon strips.

=== Intellectual properties ===
- The Sea Prince (animated film)
- The legend of Kalari Kutty, (animated series)
- Pammi and I (animated series)
- Magic Letters (animated series)
- Once Upon a Time (animated series)
- Potbelly Narayan (animated short)
- Shakti (animated series)
