= Hum Tum (film) =

2004 Indian film by Kunal Kohli

- Promotional poster
- Directed by: Kunal Kohli
- Screenplay by: Siddharth Anand; Kunal Kohli
- Dialogues by: Kunal Kohli
- Produced by: Aditya Chopra
- Starring: Saif Ali Khan; Rani Mukerji; Rishi Kapoor; Kirron Kher; Abhishek Bachan
- Cinematography: Sunil Patel
- Edited by: Ritesh Soni
- Music by: Songs: Jatin–Lalit; Background Score: Salim–Sulaiman
- Production company: Yash Raj Films
- Distributed by: Yash Raj Films
- Release date: 28 May 2004
- Running time: 143 minutes
- Country: India
- Language: Hindi
- Budget: ₹8 crore
- Box office: ₹42.6 crore

Hum Tum (transl. Me and You) is a 2004 Indian Hindi-language romantic comedy film written and directed by Kunal Kohli, and produced by Aditya Chopra under the Yash Raj Films banner. The film stars Saif Ali Khan and Rani Mukerji, with a supporting cast of Rishi Kapoor, Kirron Kher, Rati Agnihotri, and Jimmy Sheirgill. Loosely inspired by the American film When Harry Met Sally... (1989), the narrative follows Karan and Rhea, two individuals who repeatedly cross paths over several years and form a complex relationship that evolves from friendship into romance.

The film marked Mukerji's third collaboration with Yash Raj Films and featured several animated interludes designed by Prakash Nambiar of Kathaa Animations, with visual effects by Tata Elxsi. Principal photography took place in India, the Netherlands, and the United States, with cinematography by Sunil Patel. The music was composed by Jatin–Lalit, with lyrics written by Prasoon Joshi.

Released theatrically on 28 May 2004, Hum Tum received mixed-to-positive reviews. Critics praised its performances, direction, animation sequences, and soundtrack, although some criticism was directed at the screenplay. The film emerged as a commercial success, grossing ₹43.22 million (US$510,000), and ranked as the sixth highest-grossing Hindi film of the year.

At the 52nd National Film Awards, Saif Ali Khan won Best Actor in a Leading Role, marking his first National Award. The film received eight nominations at the 50th Filmfare Awards, winning five—including Best Director (Kohli), Best Actress (Mukherji), Best Comedian (Khan), Best Female Playback Singer (Alka Yagnik for "Hum Tum"), and Best Scene of the Year. Over time, Hum Tum has been credited for popularising animated elements in Hindi cinema, for establishing Khan's credentials as a solo romantic lead, and for consolidating Mukerji's standing as one of the leading actresses of her generation.

== Plot ==
Karan Kapoor, a cartoonist known for his comic strip "Hum Tum," which humorously explores gender dynamics, meets Rhea Prakash, a strong-willed and practical woman, on a flight from Delhi to New York City. During a layover in Amsterdam, they briefly tour the city together, but their clashing personalities lead to friction. The encounter ends when Karan, misreading her boundaries, kisses Rhea without consent, prompting her to slap him. Before parting, Karan insists they will meet again.

Six months later in New York, Karan encounters Rhea once more—this time through his girlfriend Shalini, who is revealed to be Rhea's childhood friend. The awkward situation leads to Karan and Shalini breaking up. Three years later, Karan runs into Rhea in Delhi while assisting his mother with wedding preparations, only to discover Rhea is the bride. She is marrying Sameer, and although their meeting begins with friction, they part amicably.

Another three years pass before they meet unexpectedly in Paris, where Karan learns from Rhea's mother, Parminder "Bobby" Prakash, that Sameer died in a car accident shortly after their first anniversary. Karan, moved by Rhea's grief, resolves to help her heal.

Back in Mumbai, Karan attempts to set Rhea up with his introverted friend Mihir Vora, believing she needs someone stable. However, Mihir falls in love with another woman, Diana Fernandez, and they become engaged. On the engagement night, Rhea discovers Karan's matchmaking scheme and confronts him. Mihir later helps Rhea realise that she has fallen in love with Karan. That night, she and Karan sleep together.

The next morning, Karan, overwhelmed by guilt, proposes marriage to Rhea to “make things right,” but Rhea is hurt by his framing of their intimacy as a mistake. She leaves him, refusing to marry for the wrong reasons. Karan later realises his error and attempts to reconcile, but is unable to find her.

One year later, Karan's comic strip has become widely successful, and he publishes a book about "Hum" and "Tum," mirroring his relationship with Rhea. At the book's launch, Rhea reads the story and realises Karan's love for her. They reconcile and eventually marry. The film concludes with them as parents to a baby girl, as Karan jokingly laments about a baby boy in the next crib, predicting another future "Hum Tum" romance.

== Cast ==
- Saif Ali Khan as Karan Kapoor
- Rani Mukerji as Rhea Prakash
- Rishi Kapoor as Arjun Kapoor, Karan's father
- Kirron Kher as Parminder "Bobby" Prakash, Rhea's mother
- Rati Agnihotri as Anjali "Anju" Kapoor, Karan's mother
- Jimmy Sheirgill as Mihir Vora, Karan's friend
- Isha Koppikar as Diana Fernandez, Mihir's love interest (special appearance)
- Abhishek Bachchan as Sameer Khanna, Rhea's first husband (special appearance)
- Shenaz Treasurywala as Shalini (special appearance)
- Parinita Seth as Pooja
- Parzaan Dastur as Hum (voice only)
- Gayatri S. Iyer as Tum (voice only)

== Production ==
=== Development ===
Hum Tum was produced by Aditya Chopra under the banner of Yash Raj Films and marked Kunal Kohli's second directorial venture following Mujhse Dosti Karoge! (2002). The film was loosely inspired by the 1989 American romantic comedy When Harry Met Sally.... Kohli later revealed that he had initially intended to remake the original, stating, “We approached the studio, which had the rights of the Hollywood film. When we sent our script to them, they said that it has to be at least 70 percent similar to be an official remake. According to them, we were not, so they rejected the remake concept.”

=== Casting ===
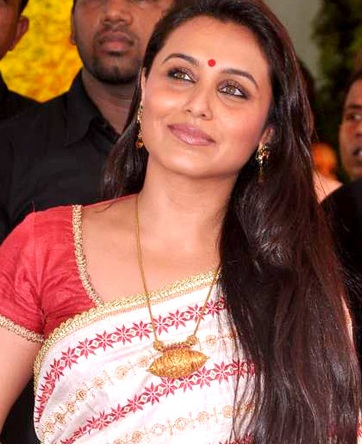
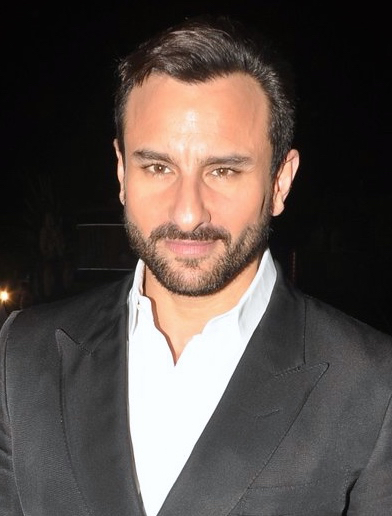
The film marked the first of several collaborations between Rani Mukerji and Saif Ali Khan.

Kunal Kohli and Aditya Chopra initially approached Aamir Khan for the role of Karan Kapoor, but he declined the offer. The role was subsequently offered to Hrithik Roshan and Vivek Oberoi, both of whom turned it down. Kohli ultimately cast Saif Ali Khan, explaining, “I realised that the role needed a younger man—someone who could present a more youthful picture. Saif has this unique quality; he can play a 21-year-old as well as a 29-year-old.” Khan later described the role as one of his “favourite onscreen characters.”

Rani Mukerji was cast as Rhea Prakash. The film marked her third collaboration with Yash Raj Films and second with Kohli, after Mujhse Dosti Karoge!. Kohli noted, “I always wanted to work with Rani and we shared a great equation,” while Mukerji called it a “special film” and said she “loved the script.”

Supporting roles included Kirron Kher as Rhea's mother Parminder, Rishi Kapoor and Rati Agnihotri as Karan's parents, and Jimmy Sheirgill as Mihir Vora. Abhishek Bachchan made a cameo appearance, while two animated characters, Hum (voiced by Parzaan Dastur) and Tum (voiced by Gayatri Iyer), were integrated into the narrative alongside the leads.

=== Filming ===
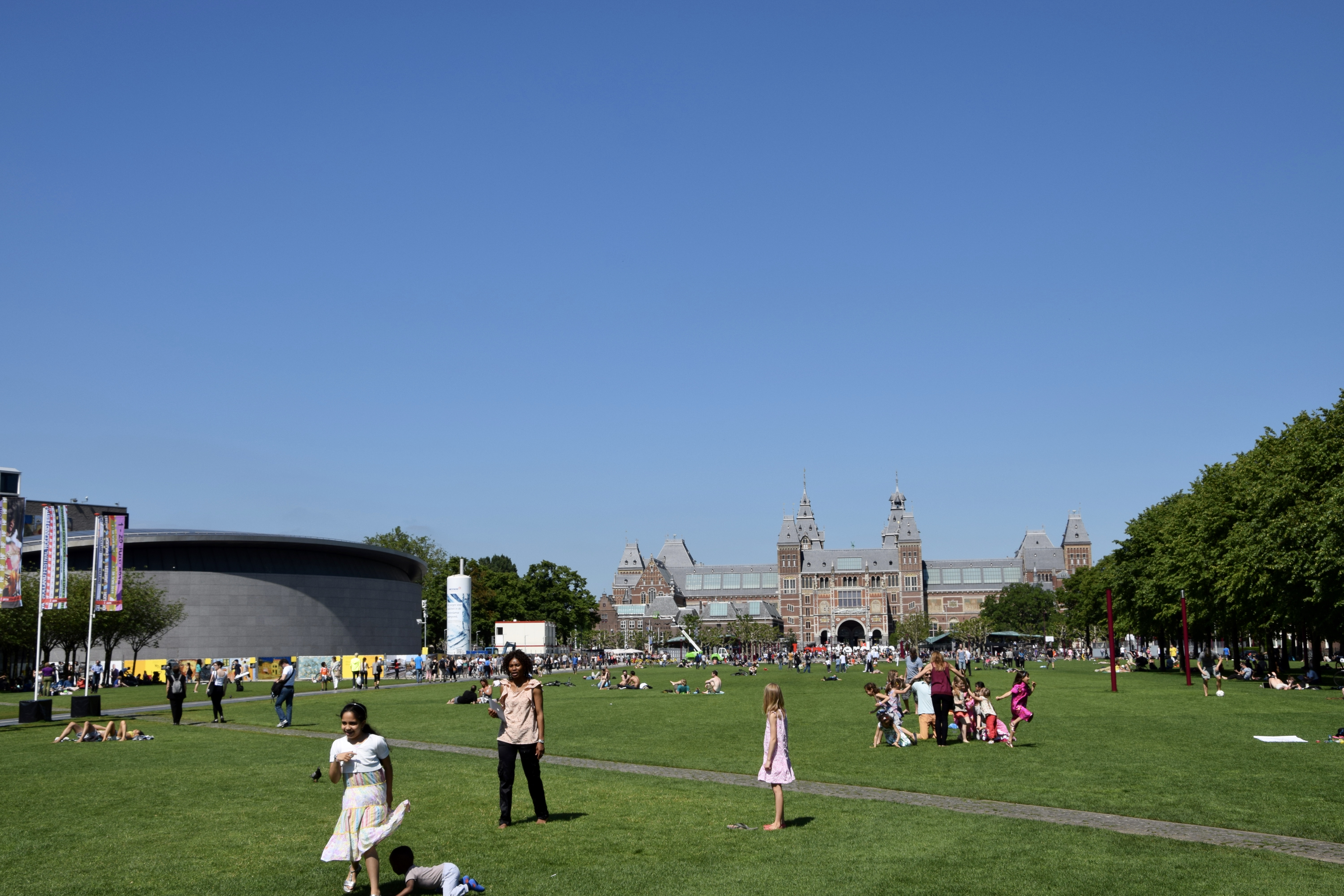
A portion of the film was shot at the Museumplein, Amsterdam.

Principal photography began in 2003. A significant portion of the film was shot in Amsterdam, Netherlands, at locations including Museumplein, the National Maritime Museum, Rijksmuseum, and Dam Square. Additional sequences were filmed in Paris and in the United States, primarily New York City, as well as at Film City in Mumbai.

== Marketing and promotion ==
Prior to its release, Hum Tum generated anticipation through its soundtrack, stylized promotional material, and narrative format that blended live action with animation. Saif Ali Khan's character Karan was introduced to audiences via an appearance on the television series Jassi Jaissi Koi Nahin. Cartoon strips based on the film's animated characters were featured in the Bombay Times. Around the time of its release, India Today published a feature titled “Bollywood's Blockbuster Summer,” highlighting Hum Tum among the season's key releases.

== Soundtrack ==
Hum Tum

Soundtrack album by Jatin–Lalit
- Released: 9 April 2004
- Genre: Feature film soundtrack
- Length: 35:14
- Languages: Hindi; English
- Label: YRF Music
- Producer: Aditya Chopra

Jatin–Lalit chronology
| Haasil (2003) | Hum Tum (2004) | Rok Sako To Rok Lo (2004) |

Singles from Hum Tum
- 1. "Ladki Kyon" Released: 9 April 2004; 2. "Hum Tum" Released: 9 April 2004

The soundtrack for Hum Tum was composed primarily by the duo Jatin–Lalit, with the exception of the track “U’n’I (Mere Dil Vich Hum Tum),” which was composed by British-Indian producer Rishi Rich. All lyrics were written by Prasoon Joshi. The album features vocals by Shaan, Alka Yagnik, Sonu Nigam, Sadhana Sargam, Babul Supriyo, Udit Narayan, Juggy D, and Veronica Mehta. The lead actors, Saif Ali Khan and Rani Mukerji, contributed spoken interludes to the song "Ladki Kyon." Mukerji's singing parts were voiced by Alka Yagnik in all tracks except "Chak De."

The soundtrack album was released on 9 April 2004 by YRF Music. The CD and audio cassette editions also featured an instrumental version of the title track "Hum Tum" and a deleted song titled "Yaara Yaara." The melody of "Yaara Yaara" was later reused in Kohli's 2006 film Fanaa, particularly in the songs "Chand Sifarish" and "Chanda Chamke." The composition is reportedly inspired by "Samra We Betha" by the Iraqi band Miami. Similarly, "Chak De" draws inspiration from Ragheb Alama’s Arabic song "Yalla Ya Shabab."

The film additionally includes a cover version of "Main Shayar To Nahin" from the 1973 film Bobby, sung by Shailendra Singh and Shaan for the characters portrayed by Rishi Kapoor and Saif Ali Khan, respectively. This track was not included on the official soundtrack album.

Hum Tum (Original Motion Picture Soundtrack)
| No. | Title | Singer(s) | Length |
|---|---|---|---|
| 1. | "Ladki Kyon" | Shaan, Saif Ali Khan, Alka Yagnik, Rani Mukerji | 06:18 |
| 2. | "Chak De" | Sonu Nigam, Sadhana Sargam | 05:46 |
| 3. | "Hum Tum" | Alka Yagnik, Babul Supriyo | 05:29 |
| 4. | "Gore Gore" | Alka Yagnik | 04:57 |
| 5. | "Yaara Yaara" | Alka Yagnik, Udit Narayan | 04:44 |
| 6. | "Hum Tum" (Sad Version) | Alka Yagnik | 02:17 |
| 7. | ""U'n'I" (Mere Dil Vich Hum Tum)" | Juggy D, Veronica Mehta | 03:38 |
| 8. | "Hum Tum" (Instrumental) | | 03:25 |
| Total length: | | | 35:14 |

=== Critical response ===
The soundtrack of Hum Tum received generally positive reviews from critics. Taran Adarsh of Bollywood Hungama wrote, "Jatin–Lalit's music is amongst the high points of the enterprise... the narrative in Hum Tum does get a definite push thanks to a lovely score from this talented music director duo." He specifically praised the placement of songs such as "Hum Tum", "Ladki Kyon", "Chak De", and "Gore Gore" within the narrative. Jay Mamtora of BBC commented that the music had a "been there heard that" quality but acknowledged that "a couple of the tracks are undeniably catchy."

=== Commercial performance ===
The soundtrack achieved commercial success in India. According to Box Office India, it sold approximately 1.6 million units, ranking as the eighth highest-selling Bollywood album of 2004. Several tracks, including the title song and "Ladki Kyon", performed well on national music charts during the film's theatrical run.

=== Awards ===
At the 50th Filmfare Awards, Jatin–Lalit were nominated for Best Music Director, while Alka Yagnik won Best Female Playback Singer for the song "Hum Tum." Lyricist Prasoon Joshi received the Screen Award for Best Lyricist for the same track.

== Release ==
Hum Tum was released theatrically in India on 28 May 2004. In 2006, Yash Raj Films released the film on DVD, with premieres in international markets including France and Germany. A Blu-ray edition was subsequently released in August 2011. The film was later made available for digital streaming on Netflix.

== Reception ==
=== Box office ===
Hum Tum opened to strong box office performance. It collected ₹12.3 million on its opening day and ₹74.9 million during its first week. The film went on to become a major commercial success, grossing ₹432.2 million domestically, making it the sixth highest-grossing Hindi film of the year.

Internationally, Hum Tum earned ₹152.5 million, with notable success in the United Kingdom, where it ranked seventh in the top ten box office chart during its opening week. The film was among the top earners of the decade both in India and overseas markets.

=== Critical reception ===
Hum Tum received generally positive reviews from critics, with particular praise for the performances, dialogues, and the film's modern take on romance. Taran Adarsh of Bollywood Hungama called the casting "one of the film's strengths" and praised Saif Ali Khan's "arresting performance" and Rani Mukerji’s "flawless" portrayal, adding that she had taken “a giant leap as an actor.” He concluded, "On the whole, Hum Tum is a decent fare, topped with captivating performances and mesmerising music. But a slow and not-too-exciting second half dilutes the impact to an extent."

Tanmay Kumar Nanda of Rediff.com observed that "Hum Tum tugs at your heartstrings, makes you laugh and rejoice in the vagaries of loving and losing without losing itself in that abyss that has claimed many a Hindi film: mushy sentimentalism." Jay Mamtora of BBC described it as “a decent heart-warming popcorn flick” and noted that while the plot was familiar, director Kunal Kohli's treatment and effective casting made the film “eminently watchable and enjoyable.”

Kaveree Bamzai of India Today appreciated the screenplay and tonal balance, writing, “The witty exchanges don't ring false, the emotional pitch in the melodramatic parts is just right and the cameos are succulent." Archana Vora of NDTV found the film derivative of “the Yash Chopra school of romance” and When Harry Met Sally... (1989), but credited Khan with a “savvy and sassy” performance that overshadowed Mukerji. Derek Elley of Variety described the film as “a couple of notches below the Chopra par,” citing a lack of strong chemistry between the leads and "so-so dialogue."

Chitra Mahesh of The Hindu praised the film's tone and direction, writing, "Hum Tum is one of those films where you would walk out with a broad smile on your face... The film with direction, dialogue and story by Kohli, is extremely suave and incredibly charming. Khan and Mukerji excel in their parts." Namrata Joshi of Outlook India commended the film's conversational structure and performances but noted, “Khan's easy domination of every possible frame” often left Mukerji reacting rather than leading. Udita Jhunjhunwala of Mid-Day found it an improvement over Kohli's previous film Mujhse Dosti Karoge! (2002) but criticized the styling, editing, and soundtrack. She praised Khan's "comic timing and spontaneous performance," calling him the primary reason to watch the film.

== Accolades ==
Hum Tum received several accolades, including one National Film Award, five Filmfare Awards and one International Indian Film Academy Award. Hum Tum also earned two Global Indian Film Awards, one People's Choice Awards India, four Screen Awards, two Stardust Awards, and two Zee Cine Awards.

== Legacy ==
Hum Tum has been widely regarded as one of the most influential romantic comedies in Hindi cinema. It was named among Bollywood's ten most romantic films by The Times of India and Vogue India. Filmfare observed that the film "hasn't ceased to be relatable" over time, while Zee News credited it with setting "a benchmark and [creating] a new genre of romantic comedy for Bollywood," highlighting its departure from the traditional "love at first sight" narrative. The film also attracted attention for its exploration of themes such as premarital sex, which were considered unconventional for mainstream Hindi cinema at the time. It was featured in Shubhra Gupta’s book 50 Films That Changed Bollywood, in which she highlighted its impact on the genre and its lasting relevance.

The film marked Kunal Kohli’s first directorial success and is often cited as a milestone in the careers of Kohli, Saif Ali Khan, and Rani Mukerji. For Khan, it was his first major success as a solo lead, while for Mukerji, it marked the first time she won Best Actress at major award ceremonies. Both actors' performances are regarded among their most notable works, with the film credited for consolidating their stature in the industry. Bollywood Hungama listed Khan and Mukerji among the top ten romantic onscreen couples of the decade, and The Indian Express referred to them as the "Shah Rukh Khan and Kajol of the 2000s."

In 2023, Hum Tum was featured in the Netflix docu-series The Romantics, in the episode titled “The New Guard,” which explored the emergence of a younger generation of romantic leads under the Yash Raj Films banner.

Mukerji's portrayal of Rhea Prakash received attention for its departure from conventional female characters in Hindi cinema. Reflecting on the role, Mukerji stated, “Hum Tum was a very special and a modern subject. It was definitely ahead of its time... Rhea’s character stood for the modern Indian woman at that time.” Harshita Singh of ScoopWhoop praised the character's independence, feminism, compassion, and practical outlook, calling her a well-rounded and progressive female lead.

== Spin-offs and adaptations ==
Two graphic novels based on Hum Tum and its animated characters were published by Yomics World in 2012. The first, titled Hum Tum: The War Begins!, was a standalone publication centered around the characters Hum and Tum. The second, Ek Tha Tiger: Caught in the Web, was a crossover graphic novel featuring characters from both Hum Tum and the action thriller Ek Tha Tiger (2012).

As of 2004, in addition to the graphic novels, a dedicated cartoon series featuring the characters Hum and Tum was reportedly in development.

== See also ==
- List of highest-grossing Bollywood films
- List of Hindi films of 2004
