= Vishesh Films =

Indian film company

- Industry: Motion pictures
- Founded: 1987
- Founder: Mahesh Bhatt; Mukesh Bhatt
- Headquarters: Mumbai, India
- Key people: Vishesh Bhatt (CEO)
- Products: Motion pictures
- Owner: Mukesh Bhatt
- Website: www.visheshfilms.com
- Footnotes; Mahesh Bhatt served as the studio's primary presenter and creative head until stepping down in 2021.

Vishesh Films is an Indian film production and distribution company based in Mumbai, founded in 1987 by brothers Mahesh Bhatt and Mukesh Bhatt, and named after Mukesh's son, filmmaker Vishesh Bhatt.

For over three decades, the company operated as a major commercial banner in Hindi cinema, recognized for producing high-concept, low-to-medium-budget thrillers, romantic dramas, and horror films characterized by widely popular soundtrack albums. The banner was responsible for several commercial successes and franchise starters, including Aashiqui (1990), Jurm (1990), Dil Hai Ke Manta Nahin (1991), Sadak (1991), Junoon (1992), Sir (1993), Naajayaz (1995), Dushman (1998), Ghulam (1998), Sangharsh (1999), Kasoor (2001), Raaz (2002), Murder (2004), Gangster (2006), Awarapan (2007), Jannat (2008), Murder 2 (2011), Jannat 2 (2012), Aashiqui 2 (2013), and Awarapan 2 (2026). Following a professional parting between the brothers in 2021, the company came under the sole ownership of Mukesh Bhatt, with Vishesh Bhatt serving as its creative and production head.

== History ==
In 1987 Mukesh Bhatt turned producer when he set up his own banner, "Vishesh Films", naming it after his son Vishesh Bhatt. He went on to become one of the most recognised banners of the Indian film industry in the coming decade, giving both serious productions (along with his brother Mahesh who directed these films) – like Daddy (1989), launching his niece Pooja Bhatt as a movie actress, — as well as commercial romantic hits like Kabzaa (1988), Aashiqui (1990) and Dil Hai Ki Manta Nahin (1991), in which he cast Pooja with actor Aamir Khan. He next produced Sadak (1991), which remains his highest grossing work, also directed by his brother Mahesh Bhatt. He won critical acclaim for Sir (1993), which saw Pooja Bhatt act with Naseeruddin Shah along with the hit Criminal (1995).

He also produced the film Tadipaar (1993). Following this, he produced dramas like Dastak (1996), the debut film of Miss Universe 1994-turned-actress Sushmita Sen, and Tamanna (1997). In 1998 his brother Mahesh Bhatt directed his last directorial venture Zakhm (1998) returned to the censor board because of right-wing pressure critical of its references to the Mumbai riots of 1993 and joined as full-time creative head of Vishesh Films. Thereafter, the Bhatt brothers joined hands and churned out stories and screenplays for over twenty films, many of which were box-office successes, like Dushman (1998), Sangharsh (1999), Raaz (2002), Murder (2004), Gangster (2006), Woh Lamhe (2006), Murder 2 (2011), Jism 2 (2012) and Murder 3 (2013).

Vishesh Films is known for producing small-budgeted commercially successful films with great music. They produced thrillers like Criminal (1994), Ghulam (1998), Raaz (2002), Murder (2004), Zeher (2005), and Gangster (2006), all of which were major commercial successes.

They further produced Zeher (2005), Awarapan (2007), and Jannat (2008), all starring Emraan Hashmi. While the first two were moderate successes, the latter emerged as a super hit. They then began producing quasi-sequels and have given the maximum number of franchises to Indian cinema. However, a common criticism of the films produced under the banner has been that the films are unofficial adaptations and rip-offs of many Hollywood and South Korean films.

For 30 years, Mukesh along with his brother, Mahesh, produced films under the production house. However owing to differences between the brothers, Mukesh officially took over Vishesh Films and in May 2021, it was publicly announced that Mahesh Bhatt was no more associated with the production house.

== Filmography ==
Key
†	Denotes films that have not yet been released

The following is a list of films produced under the banner Vishesh Films.

=== 1986–2000 ===
Release date			Title	CBFC rating	Director	Writer	Composer	Lyricist	Cast
1988	May	20	Kabzaa	U	Mahesh Bhatt	Salim Khan	Rajesh Roshan	Anand Bakshi	Sanjay Dutt Raj Babbar Amrita Singh Paresh Rawal
1989	February	08	Daddy	U	Mahesh Bhatt	Suraj Sanim	Rajesh Roshan	Suraj Sanim	Anupam Kher Pooja Bhatt Manohar Singh Raj Zutshi
1990	July	13	Jurm	A	Mahesh Bhatt	Salim Khan	Rajesh Roshan	Indeevar Payam Sayeedi	Meenakshi Sheshadri Sangeeta Bijlani Vinod Khanna
1990	August	17	Aashiqui	U	Mahesh Bhatt	Akash Khurana Robin Bhatt	Nadeem-Shravan	Sameer, Rani Malik & Madan Pal	Rahul Roy Anu Aggarwal Deepak Tijori
1991	July	3	Dil Hai Ke Manta Nahin	U	Mahesh Bhatt	Robin Bhatt Sharad Joshi	Nadeem-Shravan	Faiz Anwar	Aamir Khan Anupam Kher Pooja Bhatt Tiku Talsania
1991	December	3	Sadak	A	Mahesh Bhatt	Robin Bhatt	Nadeem-Shravan	Sameer, Surinder Saathi, Rani Malik	Pooja Bhatt Sanjay Dutt
1992	September	18	Junoon	A	Mahesh Bhatt	Robin Bhatt	Nadeem-Shravan	Sameer, Surinder Saathi, Rani Malik and Santosh Anand	Avinash Wadhawan Pooja Bhatt Rahul Roy
1993			Jaanam	U	Vikram Bhatt		Anu Malik	Faaiz Anwar Indeevar Qateel Shifai Rahat Indori	Paresh Rawal Pooja Bhatt Rahul Roy
1993	July	9	Sir	U/A	Mahesh Bhatt	Jay Dixit	Anu Malik	Qateel Shifai Rahat Indori	Atul Agnihotri Naseeruddin Shah Pooja Bhatt
1993	December	17	Tadipaar	U	Mahesh Bhatt		Nadeem–Shravan	Sameer	Anupam Kher Gulshan Grover Juhi Chawla Mithun Chakraborty Pooja Bhatt
1994	August	19	Naaraaz	A	Mahesh Bhatt	Jay Dixit	Anu Malik	Dev Kohli Maya Govind Qateel Shifai Rahat Indori Zameer Qazmi	Atul Agnihotri Gulshan Grover Mithun Chakraborty Pooja Bhatt Sonali Bendre
1995	March	17	Naajayaz	U/A	Mahesh Bhatt	Jay Dixit	Anu Malik	Sudarshan Faakir Indeewar Rahat Indori Maya Govind Pushpa Verma	Ajay Devgn Juhi Chawla Naseeruddin Shah
1995	July	21	Criminal	A	Mahesh Bhatt		M. M. Keeravani	Vennelakanti Sirivennela Sitaramasastri	Manisha Koirala Nagarjuna Akkineni Ramya Krishnan
1996	June	28	Fareb	A	Vikram Bhatt	Iqbal Durrani	Jatin–Lalit	Neeraj Indeevar	Kundan singh Milind Gunaji Suman Ranganathan
1996	November	29	Dastak	A	Mahesh Bhatt	Vikram Bhatt	Rajesh Roshan	Javed Akhtar	Bhavna Datta Manoj Bajpai Mukul Dev Sharad Kapoor Sushmita Sen Tiku Talsania Vishwajeet Pradhan
1997	May	8	Dil Kitna Nadan Hai	U/A	Ravi Rai	Vikram Bhatt	Anu Malik	Faiz Anwar, Hasrat Jaipuri, Rahat Indori	Raja Bherwani, Raageshwari, Kiran Kumar
1998	May	29	Dushman	A	Tanuja Chandra	Sachin Bhowmick; Girish Dhamija; Mahesh Bhatt	Aadesh Shrivastava Uttam Singh	Anand Bakshi	Kajol Sanjay Dutt Ashutosh Rana
1998	June	19	Ghulam	A	Vikram Bhatt	Anjum Rajabali	Jatin–Lalit	Indeevar, Nitin Raikwar, Sameer, Vinod Mahendra	Aamir Khan, Rani Mukerji, Deepak Tijori, Sharat Saxena; Pooja Bhatt
1998	December	25	Zakhm	A	Mahesh Bhatt	Mahesh Bhatt Tanuja Chandra Girish Dhamija	M. M. Keeravani	Anand Bakshi	Ajay Devgn, Pooja Bhatt, Nagarjuna, Sonali Bendre
1999	September	3	Sangharsh	A	Tanuja Chandra	Girish Dhamija Mahesh Bhatt	Jatin–Lalit		Akshay Kumar Ashutosh Rana Preity Zinta
1999	December	10	Yeh Hai Mumbai Meri Jaan	U	Mahesh Bhatt	Soni Razdan Ravinder Prashar Girish Dhamija	Jatin–Lalit	Indeevar, Nitin Raikwar, Sameer, Faaiz Anwar	Saif Ali Khan, Twinkle Khanna, Chunky Pandey, Akshay Anand

=== 2001–present ===
Release date			Title	CBFC rating	Director	Writer	Composer	Lyricist	Cast
2001	February	2	Kasoor	A	Vikram Bhatt	Girish Dhamija Mahesh Bhatt	Nadeem-Shravan	Sameer	Aftab Shivdasani Apurva Agnihotri Ashutosh Rana Divya Dutta Irrfan Khan Lisa Ray
2001	November	16	Yeh Zindagi Ka Safar	U/A	Tanuja Chandra	Girish Dhamija Gajra Kottary Mahesh Bhatt	Daboo Malik; Sajid–Wajid	Salim Bijnori Anwar Sagar Nasir Faraaz; Faaiz Anwar	Ameesha Patel Gulshan Grover Jimmy Shergill Nafisa Ali
2002	February	1	Raaz	A	Vikram Bhatt	Girish Dhamija Mahesh Bhatt	Nadeem-Shravan	Sameer	Ashutosh Rana Bipasha Basu Dino Morea Malini Sharma
2002	September	20	Gunaah	A	Amol Shetge	Mahesh Bhatt Pranay Narayan	Anand Raj Anand Sajid–Wajid	Praveen Bhardwaj, Anand Bakshi	Bipasha Basu Dino Morea Irrfan Khan
2003	July	4	Saaya	U/A	Anurag Basu	Amol Shetge	Anu Malik M. M. Keeravani	Sayeed Quadri	John Abraham Mahima Chaudhry Tara Sharma
2003	August	15	Footpath	A	Vikram Bhatt	Girish Dhamija Mahesh Bhatt	Himesh Reshammiya Nadeem-Shravan	Sameer	Aftab Shivdasani Bipasha Basu Emraan Hashmi Rahul Dev
2003	October	24	Inteha	A	Vikram Bhatt	Girish Dhamija Mahesh Bhatt	Anu Malik	Rahat Indori, Praveen Bhardwaj and Dev Kohli	Ashmit Patel Nauheed Cyrusi Vidya Malvade
2004	April	2	Murder	A	Anurag Basu	Anurag Basu Subodh Chopra	Anu Malik	Rahat Indori Sayeed Quadri	Ashmit Patel Emraan Hashmi Mallika Sherawat
2004	September	24	Tumsa Nahin Dekha: A Love Story	U/A	Anurag Basu	Subodh Chopra	Nadeem–Shravan	Sameer	Emraan Hashmi Dia Mirza Anupam Kher
2005			Film Star	U	Tanuja Chandra	Girish Dhamija	Jatin–Lalit Daboo Malik		Mahima Chaudhry Priyanshu Chatterjee Vasundhara Das
2005	March	25	Zeher	A	Mohit Suri	Mohit Suri Jay Dixit	Anu Malik Roop Kumar Rathod Mithoon	Sayeed Quadri	Emraan Hashmi Sameer Kochhar Shamita Shetty Udita Goswami
2005	May	20	Nazar	A	Soni Razdan	Mahesh Bhatt Anand Sivakumaran	Anu Malik		Aly Khan Ashmit Patel Meera Rupak Mann
2005	December	9	Kalyug	A	Mohit Suri	Mohit Suri Jay Dixit Anand Sivakumaran	Anu Malik, Mithoon, Gauhar Mumtaz, Rohit Hyatt-Faisal Rafi	Sayeed Quadri	Amrita Singh Emraan Hashmi Kunal Khemu
2006	April	28	Gangster	A	Anurag Basu	Mahesh Bhatt	Pritam	Mayur Puri Neelesh Misra Sayeed Quadri	Emraan Hashmi Kangana Ranaut Shiney Ahuja
2006	July	21	The Killer	A	Hasnain Hydrabadwala, Raksha Mistry	Mahendra Lakhan	Sajid–Wajid	Sayeed Quadri	Emraan Hashmi Irfan Khan Nisha Kothari
2006	September	29	Woh Lamhe	A	Mohit Suri	Mahesh Bhatt	Pritam	Sayeed Quadri	Kangana Ranaut Shiney Ahuja
2007	June	29	Awarapan	U/A	Mohit Suri	Shagufta Rafique	Pritam, Mustafa Zahid	Asif Ali Baig Annie Khalid Sayeed Quadri	Emraan Hashmi Mrinalini Sharma Shriya Saran
2007	August	31	Dhokha	U/A	Pooja Bhatt	Shagufta Rafique	M. M. Keeravani	Shagufta Rafique	Ashutosh Rana Aushima Sawhney Muzammil Ibrahim Tulip Joshi
2007	December	28	Showbiz	U	Raju Khan	Shagufta Rafique	Lalit Pandit		Tushar Jalota Gulshan Grover Mrinalini Sharma Sushant Singh
2008	May	16	Jannat	U/A	Kunal Deshmukh	Vishesh Bhatt	Pritam	Kamran Ahmed Neelesh Misra Sayeed Quadri	Emraan Hashmi Javed Sheikh Sonal Chauhan Sameer Kochhar Vishal Malhotra
2009	January	23	Raaz – The Mystery Continues	A	Mohit Suri	Shagufta Rafique	Gourov Dasgupta Pranay M Rijia Raju Singh Sharib Sabri Toshi Sabri	Kumaar Sayeed Quadri	Adhyayan Suman Emraan Hashmi Kangana Ranaut
2009	July	17	Jashnn	U/A	Hasnain Hyderabadwala Raksha Mistry		Nouman Javaid Sandesh Shandilya Sharib Sabri Toshi Sabri	Kumaar Neelesh Misra Nouman Javaid	Adhyayan Suman Anjana Sukhani Humayun Saeed Shahana Goswami
2009	November	13	Tum Mile	U/A	Kunal Deshmukh		Pritam	Kumaar Sayeed Quadri	Emraan Hashmi Soha Ali Khan
2010	October	8	Crook	A	Mohit Suri	Ankur Tewari	Pritam	Kumaar	Emraan Hashmi Emraan Hashmi Arjan Bajwa
2011	July	8	Murder 2	A	Mohit Suri	Mahesh Bhatt Shagufta Rafique	Harshit Saxena Mithoon Sangeet Haldipur Siddharth Haldipur	Kumaar Mithoon Sayeed Quadri	Emraan Hashmi Jacqueline Fernandez Prashant Narayanan Sudhanshu Pandey
2012	March	30	Blood Money	A	Vishal Mahadkar	Upendra Sidhye	Jeet Gannguli Pranay M Rijia Sangeet Haldipur Siddharth Haldipur	Kumaar Sayeed Quadri	Amrita Puri Kunal Khemu
2012	May	4	Jannat 2	A	Kunal Deshmukh	Shagufta Rafique	Pritam	Sayeed Quadri	Emraan Hashmi Esha Gupta Randeep Hooda
2012	September	7	Raaz 3	A	Vikram Bhatt	Shagufta Rafique	Jeet Gannguli Rashid		Bipasha Basu Emraan Hashmi Esha Gupta
2013	February	15	Murder 3	U/A	Vishesh Bhatt	Mahesh Bhatt	Pritam Roxen (band)	Sayeed Quadri	Randeep Hooda Aditi Rao Hydari Sara Loren
2013	April	26	Aashiqui 2	U	Mohit Suri	Shagufta Rafique	Jeet Gannguli Mithoon Ankit Tiwari		Aditya Roy Kapoor Shraddha Kapoor
2014	May	30	CityLights	A	Hansal Mehta		Jeet Gannguli		Patraleka; Rajkummar Rao
2015	January	30	Khamoshiyan	A	Karan Darra		Jeet Gannguli Bobby-Imran Ankit Tiwari Naved Zafar		Sapna Pabbi; Ali Fazal; Gurmeet Choudhary
2015	April	17	Mr. X	U/A	Vikram Bhatt		Jeet Gannguli Mithoon Ami Mishra		Emraan Hashmi; Amyra Dastur
2015	June	12	Hamari Adhuri Kahani	U	Mohit Suri		Jeet Gannguli Ankit Tiwari		Emraan Hashmi; Vidya Balan; Rajkummar Rao
2016	April	8	Love Games	A	Vikram Bhatt	Vikram Bhatt	Sangeet Haldipur Sidharth Haldipur	Kausar Munir, Vikram Bhatt	Patraleka; Tara Alisha Berry; Gaurav Arora
2016	September	16	Raaz: Reboot	A	Vikram Bhatt Girish Dhamija		Jeet Gannguli Sangeet Haldipur Sidharth Haldipur		Emraan Hashmi; Kriti Kharbanda; Gaurav Arora
2017	April	14	Begum Jaan	A	Srijit Mukherji	Sumair Malik	Anu Malik	Kausar Munir	Vidya Balan; Ila Arun; Naseeruddin Shah; Rajit Kapoor; Ashish Vidyarthi; Gauahar Khan; Chunky Pandey; Pallavi Sharda; Mishti
2018	October	12	Jalebi	U/A	Pushpadeep Bharadwaj	Kausar Munir, Pushpdeep Bhardwaj	Jeet Gannguli, Tanishk Bagchi, Javed-Mohsin, Abhishekh Mishra, Samuel-Akanksha	Rashmi Virag, Prashant Ingole, Manoj Kumarnath, Arafat Mehmood and Kunaal Vermaa	Rhea Chakraborty; Varun Mitra; Digangana Suryavanshi
2020	August	28	Sadak 2	V/UA	Mahesh Bhatt	Mahesh Bhatt, Sumitra Sengupta	Jeet Gannguli, Ankit Tiwari, Samidh Mukherjee, Urvi, Suniljeet	Jeet Gannguli, Rashmi Virag, Vijay Vijawatt, Shabbir Ahmed, Suniljeet and Shalu Vaish	Sanjay Dutt; Pooja Bhatt; Aditya Roy Kapoor; Alia Bhatt
2024	May	31	Savi	UA	Abhinay Deo	Parveez Shaikh, Aseem Arora	Vishal Mishra, Javed-Mohsin, Piyush Shanker, Arkadeep Karmakar	Raj Shekhar, Rashmi Virag, Ritajaya Banerjee	Anil Kapoor; Divya Khosla Kumar; Harshvardhan Rane
2026	August	14	Awarapan 2	U/A	Nitin Kakkar	Bilal Siddiqi, Vishesh Bhatt, Nitin Kakkar	Mithoon, Amaal Mallik, Jeet Gannguli, Akhil Sachdeva, Wasif Ahmad	Rashmi Virag, Sayeed Quadri, Akhil Sachdeva, Sachin Urmtosh	Emraan Hashmi; Disha Patani; Shabana Azmi

== Top-grossing films ==
Rank	Name	Year	Worldwide Gross	Starring	Ref.
1	Awarapan 2	2026	₹207.3 crore (US$22 million)	Emraan Hashmi, Disha Patani, Shabana Azmi	
2	Aashiqui 2	2013	₹109 crore (US$12 million)	Aditya Roy Kapoor, Shraddha Kapoor	
3	Raaz 3	2012	₹101.1 crore (US$11 million)	Emraan Hashmi, Bipasha Basu, Esha Gupta	
4	Murder 2	2011	₹67.84 crore (US$7.2 million)	Emraan Hashmi, Jacqueline Fernandez	
5	Jannat 2	2012	₹63.09 crore (US$6.7 million)	Emraan Hashmi, Esha Gupta, Randeep Hooda	
6	Jism 2	2012	₹49 crore (US$5.2 million)	Sunny Leone, Randeep Hooda, Arunoday Singh	
