= Sadak 2 =

2020 Indian film by Mahesh Bhatt

- Official release poster
- Directed by: Mahesh Bhatt
- Written by: Mahesh Bhatt; Suhrita Sengupta
- Produced by: Mukesh Bhatt
- Starring: Sanjay Dutt; Alia Bhatt; Aditya Roy Kapur; Jisshu Sengupta
- Cinematography: Jay I. Patel
- Edited by: Sandeep Kurup
- Music by: Songs: Jeet Gannguli; Ankit Tiwari; Samidh Mukerjee; Urvi; Suniljeet; Background Score: Sandeep Chowta
- Production companies: Fox Star Studios; Vishesh Films
- Distributed by: Disney+ Hotstar
- Release date: 28 August 2020
- Running time: 133 minutes
- Country: India
- Language: Hindi

Sadak 2 (Hindi pronunciation: [sə.ɽək 2]; transl. Road 2) is a 2020 Indian Hindi-language action thriller road film directed by Mahesh Bhatt and produced by Fox Star Studios and Mukesh Bhatt under their banner Vishesh Films. A sequel to the 1991 film Sadak, it stars Sanjay Dutt (reprising his role from the original), Alia Bhatt and Aditya Roy Kapur in the lead roles with an ensemble supporting cast, while Pooja Bhatt makes a special appearance. The film's story takes place twenty-nine years after the events of its predecessor.

The film marked Mahesh Bhatt's return as a director after 20 years as well as his final directorial work till date. Its trailer was released on 12 August 2020 on YouTube, and within a week, it became the second most-disliked video and the most-disliked film teaser/trailer on the platform due to internet users protesting nepotism in Bollywood in the aftermath of the death of Sushant Singh Rajput.

Sadak 2 was released on 28 August 2020 on the streaming platform Disney+ Hotstar in India and in U.S. theaters by Gravitas Ventures. The film was panned by critics who criticized its screenplay, performances, especially Bhatt's, use of clichés, cinematography and music. It is deemed inferior to the original by Indian critics and audiences in addition to being considered one of the worst films ever made.

== Plot ==
Aarya Desai vandalises a placard of Guru Gyaan Prakash. She is stopped by her step-mother Nandini and father Yogesh and Gyaan Prakash's ashram people. Ravi Kishore Verma, now an elderly man has recently lost his love and wife, Pooja. He attempts suicide and gets hospitalised. Ravi refuses when the doctor asks him to admit himself in a mental rehab. Aarya runs away, and enters Ravi's home, stating she'd booked Kailash 3 months before.

Aarya convinces Ravi to visit Kailash for Pooja's sake and gives a letter with her handwriting. Ravi agrees. Nandini and Yogesh go to Gyaan Prakash with Commissioner Rajesh Puri. Gyaan Prakash says Aarya will die by her own blood. Aarya tells Ravi about her mission to stop Guru Gyaan Prakash and all other fake gurus. In past Nandini killed Aarya's mother Shakuntala, married Yogesh and begun using their wealth to run Gyaan Prakash's ashram.

Aarya recounts meeting Vishal and initially fighting with him but reconciling and falling in love over a seminar exposing fake gurus. After her home is vandalised, they go into hiding. They're asked to visit someone who has proof against the gurus. However, it turns out as an ambush, and Vishal kills the hitman in self-defense. Ravi picks him up from jail. Yogesh and Nandini find Vishal and Aarya's reunion in security footage. Aarya and Vishal are cornered by gangster Dilip Hathkaaka.

Ravi arrives and saves them. Vishal confesses his real name is Munna Chavan, saying he came to Mumbai to win a reality show but ended up becoming a drug addict. Guru Gyaan Prakash's men helped and sent him to pretend to be in love with and kill Aarya. However, upon attending her seminars, he started questioning his own belief and fell in love with Aarya. Ravi takes them to his friend, John's house. It is revealed that Yogesh had planned Shakuntala's death, and now he kills Nandini.

In the end, Ravi kills Yogesh and Gyaan Prakash, dies and imagines Pooja calling out to him. Aarya performs his last rites, and has also won her battle against fake gurus.

== Cast ==
- Sanjay Dutt as Ravi Kishore Verma
- Alia Bhatt as Aarya Desai / Misha Verma
- Aditya Roy Kapur as Vishal Agnihotri / Munna Chavan
- Jisshu Sengupta as Yogesh Desai
- Gulshan Grover as Dilip Hathkaatha
- Makarand Deshpande as Guru Gyaanprakash
- Priyanka Bose as Nandini Desai
- Mohan Kapoor as Commissioner Rajesh Puri
- Akshay Anand as John
- Javed Khan Amrohi as Pakya
- Akash Khurana as Psychiatrist
- Himanshu Bhatt as Gaurav
- Digvijay Purohit as Sunil
- Anil George as Om
- Jahangir Karkaria as Dr. Rajshekhar Dastur
- Babrak Akbari as Killer
- Soni Arora as Shakuntala Desai
- Abdul Quadir Amin
- Sangeetha V
- Vaibhav Choudhary as Divyansh

Special appearance

- Pooja Bhatt as Pooja Verma

== Production ==
=== Development ===
In April 2017, media reports surfaced about the sequel of the 1991 film Sadak, after its lead cast Sanjay Dutt and Pooja Bhatt visited Mukesh Bhatt through the office of Vishesh Films. The source further claimed that it will feature a different plot, despite being the continuation of the original and the script will be a remake of the Tamil film Mahanadhi (1994), which will be directed by Srijit Mukherji. However, no developments about the film took place, despite its initial announcement.

On 20 September 2018, coinciding with Mahesh Bhatt's 70th birthday, Alia Bhatt announced the film officially with the title Sadak 2, with the original film's cast members, along with Alia and Aditya Roy Kapur was announced being a part of the cast. The film marked Mahesh Bhatt's return to direction after 20 years since his last film Zakhm as a director, also marked the maiden collaboration with Alia and Mahesh working together and his final directorial venture till date.

=== Filming ===
On 8 April 2019, it was confirmed that principal photography would commence in the middle of May 2019, which eventually began on 18 May 2019. The following day, Makarand Deshpande was confirmed to play the main antagonist in the film. Alia Bhatt joined the film on 21 May 2019. The first schedule of the film was completed in the third week of May in Mumbai and the second schedule began in Ooty in mid-July 2019. With a few sequences being shot in Mysore and Ooty, the film's principal photography wrapped up on 31 October 2019, except for a few patchwork scenes which were filmed in July 2020, despite the COVID-19 pandemic.

== Soundtrack ==
Sadak 2

Soundtrack album by Jeet Gannguli, Ankit Tiwari, Samidh Mukerjee, Urvi and Suniljeet
- Released: 22 August 2020
- Genre: Feature film soundtrack
- Length: 43:47
- Language: Hindi
- Label: Sony Music India

The music for the film was composed by Jeet Gannguli, Ankit Tiwari, Samidh Mukerjee, Urvi and Suniljeet with lyrics written by Rashmi Virag, Vijay Vijawatt, Shabbir Ahmed, Suniljeet and Shalu Vaish. The film score is composed by Sandeep Chowta.

Track listing
No.	Title	Lyrics	Music	Singer(s)	Length
1.	"Tum Se Hi"	Shabbir Ahmed	Ankit Tiwari	Ankit Tiwari, Leena Bose	4:43
2.	"Shukriya"	Rashmi Virag	Jeet Gannguli	Jubin Nautiyal, KK	4:05
3.	"Ishq Kamaal"	Suniljeet, Shalu Vaish	Suniljeet	Javed Ali	4:19
4.	"Dil Ki Purani Sadak"	Vijay Vijawatt	Samidh Mukerjee, Urvi	KK	4:49
5.	"Chal Tera Shukriya"	Rashmi Virag	Jeet Gannguli	Shreya Ghoshal	4:45
6.	"Purani Sadak" (Reprise)	Vijay Vijawatt	Samidh Mukherjee, Urvi	KK	3:24
7.	"Shukriya" (Reprise)	Rashmi Virag	Jeet Gannguli	Jubin Nautiyal, KK	4:44
8.	"Dil Ki Purani" (Unplugged)	Vijay Vijawatt	Samidh Mukherjee, Urvi	Samidh Mukherjee	4:48
9.	"Shukriya" (Rendition)	Rashmi Virag	Jeet Gannguli	Jubin Nautiyal, KK, Arijit Singh	4:54

== Controversies ==
=== Nepotism debate ===
Sadak 2's trailer was released on August 12, 2020, and faced vote brigading owing to the nepotism debate sparked after the death of Indian actor Sushant Singh Rajput. Speculating that Rajput had been upset over being shut out of the film industry, due to hiring practices that favored children of established film personalities, Rajput's fans blamed notable people in Bollywood, including Sadak 2 director Mahesh Bhatt and his daughter Alia. Within two days of its release, the trailer had received 5.3 million dislikes on YouTube and became the second most disliked video within a week's time.

=== Hurting Hindu sentiments ===
In July 2020, a resident of Bihar filed a complaint against the makers of the film, stating that the film's poster featured an image of Kailash Mansarovar, which "hurt Hindu sentiments". The Vishva Hindu Parishad also criticised the film's trailer for similar reasons.

== Release ==
In October 2019, Gravitas Ventures bought the United States distribution rights for the feature. The film was initially scheduled for release on 25 March 2020 in India and in United States on 24 April 2020, but was pushed to 10 July 2020 in India and 31 July 2020 in the United States due to the outbreak of COVID-19. It was again pulled from the release schedule as the shooting was delayed because of the COVID-19 pandemic lockdown in India.

On 29 June 2020, the streaming service Disney+ Hotstar conducted a virtual press conference, where Bhatt announced that the film would be released exclusively on Disney+ Hotstar. The film premiered on 28 August 2020 in India and in theaters in United States.

== Critical reception ==
Sadak 2 was panned by critics. Anna M. M. Vetticad of Firstpost gave the film 0.25 out of 5, calling it the director's interpretation of a "sleeping pill", and wrote "It is not possible to be angry with Sadak 2 for its half-baked ideas and quarter-baked script though, because it is too boring to be worthy of even anger." Calling it "One of 2020's worst films", Jyoti Sharma Bawa of Hindustan Times wrote that Sadak 2 is a "jaded and ponderous film that is stuck in the 90's, [which] is best avoided." Shubhra Gupta of The Indian Express gave the film 1 out of 5, calling it "terrible" and wondered "why would anyone want to make something so dated, so jaded, in this day and age?" Rahul Desai of Film Companion called the film "dreadful" and "atrocious", and bemoaned that the performances of the actors "sticks out like a sore thumb." Anupama Chopra of Film Companion wrote, "The storytelling, performances dialogue, cinematography, songs, background music – all seem to belong to the 90's".

== See also ==
- List of 21st-century films considered the worst
