= Naaraaz =

1994 film directed by Mahesh Bhatt

Naaraaz नाराज
- Film poster
- Directed by: Mahesh Bhatt
- Written by: Jay Dixit; Rahat Indori
- Produced by: Mukesh Bhatt
- Starring: Mithun Chakraborty; Pooja Bhatt; Atul Agnihotri; Sonali Bendre; Gulshan Grover
- Cinematography: Pravin Bhatt
- Edited by: Bharat Singh
- Music by: Anu Malik
- Production company: Vishesh Films
- Release date: 19 August 1994
- Running time: 125 minutes
- Country: India
- Language: Hindi

Naaraaz is a 1994 Indian Hindi-language action drama film directed by Mahesh Bhatt, starring Mithun Chakraborty, Pooja Bhatt, Atul Agnihotri, Sonali Bendre and Gulshan Grover.

== Plot ==
The film focuses on the strong bond between a poor man, Deva (Mithun Chakraborty), and his wealthy, educated friend, Ajay (Atul Agnihotri). Deva constantly fights for the welfare of his village, clashing with the oppressive and greedy Jagdambar (Bharat Kapoor). When Jagdambar poisons the village water supply to force the locals off their land, an enraged Deva takes the law into his own hands by killing Jagdambar and the local minister. Hunted by the police, Deva is forced to flee India and inadvertently boards a ship to Malaysia.

In Malaysia, Deva saves the life of Taoke (Gulshan Grover), a powerful underworld boss, and begins working for him to send money back to his village. However, Deva eventually disagrees with Taoke's illicit and violent criminal activities. He rebels against Taoke and escapes with Sonia (Pooja Bhatt) and his friend Zakir, protecting them from the mobster's wrath. Deva and Sonia fall in love, get married, and start a new chapter together.

While Deva is trying to make a living and protect his new family, his childhood friend Ajay is still searching for him. Ajay, now a successful author accompanied by his journalist girlfriend Sonali (Sonali Bendre), heads out to bring justice to their home village. Eventually, their paths reconnect. The friends must survive a deadly final showdown against Taoke’s men and the Malaysian police to ensure Deva and Sonia's safety and bring clean water to their village.

== Snippets ==
This is Mithun's second film after Tadipaar with Mahesh Bhatt. The film's musical score is by Anu Malik and audio is available on Tips Music Films. All three of the main leads in the film, Mithun Chakraborty, Atul Agnihotri and Pooja Bhatt later appeared in another film, Gunehgar (1995).

== Cast ==
- Mithun Chakraborty as Deva
- Pooja Bhatt as Sonia
- Atul Agnihotri as Ajay
- Sonali Bendre as Sonali Child/Item Aisa Tadpaya
- Gulshan Grover as Raghu (Reborn) Taoke Died
- Soni Razdan as Sabrina (Reborn)/Samina
- Avtar Gill as Preetam Singh
- Kunal Khemu as Young Ajay
- Silk Smitha as item number

== Soundtrack ==
This album is composed by Anu Malik. Album has 7 songs sung by Kumar Sanu, Udit Narayan, Mukul Agarwal, Alka Yagnik, Ila Arun & Alisha Chinai. Most popular & iconic song in album "Sambhala Hai Maine" sung by Kumar Sanu.

#	Title	Singer(s)	Lyrics
1.	"Sambhala Hai Maine"	Kumar Sanu	Qateel Shifai
2.	"Tere Bin Main Kuch"	Kumar Sanu, Udit Narayan	Rahat Indori
3.	"Agar Aasman Tak Mera"	Alka Yagnik, Mukul Agarwal	Zameer Kazmi
4.	"Tumhein Hum Kya Samajhte"	Kumar Sanu	Faaiz Anwar
5.	"Kitni Haseen Hai Raat"	Kumar Sanu	Hasrat Jaipuri
6.	"Aisa Tadpaya Mujhe Dil Beqarar Ne"	Ila Arun	Maya Govind
7.	"Roza Roza Sayang Sayang Re"	Alisha Chinai	Dev Kohli
