= Daava =

1997 film by Sunil Agnihotri

- Directed by: Sunil Agnihotri
- Story by: S. Khan
- Produced by: Nitin Raj Arayadath
- Starring: Naseeruddin Shah; Akshay Kumar; Raveena Tandon; Akshay Anand
- Cinematography: Pramod Bhandari
- Edited by: Pappu Sharma
- Music by: Jatin–Lalit
- Production company: Eklavya Visions
- Release date: 18 July 1997
- Country: India
- Language: Hindi
- Budget: ₹3.75 crore
- Box office: ₹5.98 crore

Daava is a 1997 Indian Hindi action drama movie directed by Sunil Agnihotri and starring Naseeruddin Shah, Akshay Kumar, Raveena Tandon and Akshay Anand in lead roles.

== Plot ==
Inspector Arjun is an honest and diligent police officer. He has an older stepbrother named Bhishma, and a younger brother named Suraj. While Bhishma, the former army officer lives with their mother in the village, Arjun and Suraj live in the city. In the city, he meets Seema, a pickpocket, and falls in love with her. Suraj gets employed at a poultry farm, but finds out that this is just a front for drugs like cocaine. His attempts to get this information to the police and his brother are in vain, as he is captured by the owners of the poultry farm, who owe their allegiance to notorious gangster Dhaman Chamunda. When Dhaman learns about Suraj, he decides to teach Arjun and Bhishma a lesson – first by splitting them up over the property they own in the village, then by framing Bhishma for the death of Suraj. With anger and hostilities reigning high amongst the two remaining brothers, the Chamunda Brothers decide to take full advantage of this situation, and watch in glee as the two brothers go against each other, in a fight to the death. Bhishma and Arjun clear their misunderstandings, but when their stepmother is killed by the Chamunda Brothers, they unite and kill them one by one until eventually destroying their empire.

== Cast ==
- Naseeruddin Shah as Bhishma
- Akshay Kumar as Inspector Arjun
- Raveena Tandon as Seema
- Akshay Anand as Suraj
- Divya Dutta as Deepa
- Mohan Joshi as Dhaman Chamunda
- Tinnu Anand as Madan Chamunda
- Rajendra Gupta as Chaggan Chamunda and Duplicate Lawyer
- Goga Kapoor as Bihari Baadshah
- Deepak Shirke as Anna
- Asha Lata as Bhishma's step-mother of Arjun and Suraj.
- Gufi Paintal as Mangal Singh (One Piece Kathyawaari Ghodo)
- Anupam Shyam as Police Inspector Shinde (cameo)
- Gavin Packard as Dhaman's henchman
- Brahmachari as Havaldar Barood Singh

== Soundtrack ==
#	Title	Singer(s)	Length	Lyricist(s)
1	Theme music	Naseeruddin Shah	02:32	Madan Pal
2	"Dil Mein Hai Tu"	Kumar Sanu, Poornima	06:08	Vinod Mahendra
3	"Ru Tu Tu Tu"	Kumar Sanu, Kavita Krishnamurthy	05:51	Vinod Mahendra
4	"Humse Hai Yaaro" (not in the film)	Kumar Sanu, Abhijeet	05:24	Vinod Mahendra
5	"Deewane Hain Deewano Se"	Kumar Sanu, Vijayeta Pandit, Kavita Krishnamurthy	04:34	Vinod Mahendra
6	"Kyun Aanchal Hamara"	Asha Bhosle	05:53	Israr Ansari
7	"One For All"	Kumar Sanu	04:58	Rani Malik
