= Tadipaar =

- Promotional poster
- Directed by: Mahesh Bhatt
- Written by: Robin Bhatt; Javed Siddiqui
- Produced by: Mukesh Bhatt
- Starring: Mithun Chakraborty; Pooja Bhatt; Juhi Chawla; Anupam Kher; Gulshan Grover; Sadashiv Amrapurkar; Tiku Talsania
- Cinematography: Pravin Bhatt
- Edited by: Sanjay Sankla
- Music by: Nadeem-Shravan
- Production company: Vishesh Films
- Release date: 17 December 1993
- Country: India
- Language: Hindi

Tadipaar (transl. Fugitive) is a 1993 Indian Hindi-language romantic action comedy film starring Mithun Chakraborty and Pooja Bhatt. It was directed by Mahesh Bhatt, produced by Mukesh Bhatt, and featured a hit soundtrack composed by Nadeem-Shravan.

The movie was released in India on the same day (17 December 1993) as another of Chakraborty's feature films, Shatranj with both films becoming a successful venture at the box office.

== Plot ==
The film portrays Shankar banished to the outskirts of the city due to past violence. One day he rescues a woman in distress, Namkeem, from hoodlums. She resembles the missing multi-millionaire Mohinidevi. Shankar gets Namkeen to impersonate her Mohinidevi, with consequences.

== Cast ==
- Mithun Chakraborty as Shankar
- Pooja Bhatt as Mohinidevi/Namkeen (twin sisters)
- Juhi Chawla as Rajkumari
- Anupam Kher as Kader
- Avtar Gill as Kadak
- Gulshan Grover as Johny
- Tiku Talsania as Inspector Mathur
- Kunickaa Sadanand as Mohinidevi's Secretary
- Makrand Deshpande as Vijay
- Vikram Gokhale as Mamaji
- Veeru Krishnan as The Dancer
- Javed Khan Amrohi as Ram
- Gavin Packard as Sidehero
- Sadashiv Amrapurkar as Maharani (cameo)

== Soundtrack ==
Tadipaar

Soundtrack album by Nadeem-Shravan
- Released: 1993
- Recorded: Sopan Khadse
- Venue: Mumbai
- Studio: Sunny Super Sound
- Genre: Feature film soundtrack
- Length: 47:36
- Language: Hindi
- Labels: Tips Cassettes & Records
- Producer: Nadeem-Shravan

Nadeem-Shravan chronology
Dil Tera Aashiq (1993)	Tadipaar (1993)	Kranti Kshetra (1993)

The music of the film was composed by Nadeem-Shravan with lyrics by Sameer. The 8-song soundtrack was released on audio cassette and compact disc by Tips Music. The full album was recorded by S. P. Balasubrahmanyam, Kumar Sanu, Alka Yagnik, Sadhna Sargam, and Vinod Rathod.

#	Title	Singer(s)
1.	"Aaj Pehli Baar Dil Ki Baat"	Kumar Sanu and Alka Yagnik
2.	"Aap Ki Dosti Kabool"	Alka Yagnik
3.	"Aap Ki Dushmani Kabool"	Kumar Sanu
4.	"Agar Mere Paas Paisa"	Vinod Rathod
5.	"Bikhri Zulfon Ko Sajaane Ki"	Kumar Sanu and Alka Yagnik
6.	"O Saiyan Saiyan"	Vinod Rathod and Alka Yagnik
7.	"Pyaar Ka Pahla Saal Hai"	Kumar Sanu and Sadhana Sargam
8.	"Yeh Zindagi Kabhi Kabhi"	S. P. Balasubramaniam and Alka Yagnik
