= Sanam Teri Kasam =

Sanam Teri Kasam (lit. 'Promise My Love') may refer to:

- Sanam Teri Kasam (1982 film), an Indian Hindi-language feature film by Narendra Bedi
- Sanam Teri Kasam (2009 film), an Indian Hindi-language romantic drama film by Lawrence D'Souza
- Sanam Teri Kasam (2016 film), an Indian Hindi-language film by Vinay Sapru and Radhika Rao
