= Vishesh =

Vishesh is an Indian given name. Notable people with the name include:

- Vishesh Bansal Indian actor
- Vishesh Bhriguvanshi, Indian basketball player
- Vishesh Bhatt, Indian filmmaker
- Vishesh Ravi, Indian politician

== See also ==
- Vishesh Films Indian film company
