= Chor Aur Chaand =

- Directed by: Pavan Kaul
- Produced by: Aditya Pancholi
- Starring: Aditya Pancholi; Pooja Bhatt
- Cinematography: Promod Pradhan
- Edited by: Afaque Husain
- Music by: Nikhil-Vinay; Yogesh (lyrics)
- Release date: 11 August 1993
- Country: India
- Language: Hindi

Chor Aur Chaand is a 1993 Indian Bollywood film directed by Pavan Kaul and produced by Aditya Pancholi. It stars Aditya Pancholi and Pooja Bhatt in pivotal roles.

It is a love story with the backdrop of drugs and its effect on the youth of the nation.

== Plot ==
Reema lives a wealthy lifestyle with her widowed businessman father, Dinkar, and her grandmother. Her father wants her to marry Vicky, but she dislikes him. On the day of the marriage, while fully dressed as a Hindu bride, Reema plans to run away. It is at this time that she sees a stranger in her house. Thinking it is her father's employee, she tries to run from him, but he catches up with her. He tells her that his name is Suraj, alias Surya, an ex-convict, who has just been released from prison. As he had no money, he was unable to eat anything, and hence had broken into their house to steal money and jewelry. While on the run, they are also joined by Hero, who had attempted to rob a bank so that he could go to Bombay and become a movie star. His attempt at robbing the bank had failed and he is now fleeing from the police. When Dinkar is told that Reema has run away, he contacts a local gangster named Lala and asks him to locate her. Lala, in turn, asks Ranga, one of his hoodlums, to find Reema. Ranga finds out where Reema, Hero and Suraj are holed up. At the same time, Inspector Naik also finds out their whereabouts. But Naik has a different reason for locating them - he has a score to settle with Suraj, and wants Reema for himself. There is no doubt at all that Reema, Suraj and Hero are headed for nothing but trouble, as the gangster and his men on one hand, and Inspector Naik on the other, close in on them, making their escape virtually impossible.

== Cast ==
- Aditya Pancholi as Suraj "Surya"
- Pooja Bhatt as Reema
- Aruna Irani as Suraj's Mother
- Aloknath as Dinkar Seth
- Kiran Kumar as Inspector Vivek
- Avtar Gill as Inspector Naik
- Raghuveer Yadav as Hero
- Shiva Rindani as Ranga

== Soundtrack ==
Nikhil-Vinay composed ten tracks penned by Yogesh. The soundtrack became popular during its time, especially the tracks "Sapno Mein Aana Dil Mein Samana" and "Baat Kya Hai Kaise Kehde Tumse Raaz Ki".

Song	Singer
"Sapnon Mein Aana"	S. P. Balasubrahmanyam, Anuradha Paudwal
"Lagne Laga Hai Mujhe"	S. P. Balasubrahmanyam, Anuradha Paudwal
"Baat Kya Hai Kaise Kehde"	S. P. Balasubrahmanyam, Anuradha Paudwal
"Sharmake Badalon Mein"	S. P. Balasubrahmanyam, Anuradha Paudwal
"Sanson Ka Kya Pata"	S. P. Balasubrahmanyam, Anuradha Paudwal
"Tere Bin Kahin"	Anuradha Paudwal, Kumar Sanu
"Janam Janam"	Anuradha Paudwal, Udit Narayan
"Tere Bina Main"	Anuradha Paudwal, Kumar Kancha
"Mohabbat Mein"	Anuradha Paudwal, Mano
"Sau Baar Humne"	Anuradha Paudwal, Mano
