= Angrakshak =

1995 film by Ravi Raja Pinisetty

- DVD cover photo
- Directed by: Ravi Raja
- Screenplay by: Ravi Raja
- Dialogues by: Anees Bazmee
- Story by: Padam Kumar
- Produced by: Vivek Kumar
- Starring: Sunny Deol; Pooja Bhatt; Saeed Jaffrey; Kulbhushan Kharbanda; Nassar; Rami Reddy; Anees Bazmee
- Cinematography: P. S. Prakash
- Edited by: M. Vellaisamy
- Music by: Anand–Milind
- Production company: Vicky Films
- Distributed by: Smita Films International
- Release date: 17 November 1995
- Country: India
- Language: Hindi
- Box office: ₹11.25 crore (equivalent to ₹110 crore or US$11 million in 2023)

Angrakshak (transl. Bodyguard is a 1995 Indian action thriller film directed by Ravi Raja. It stars Sunny Deol and Pooja Bhatt in the lead roles, along with Saeed Jaffrey, Kulbhushan Kharbanda and Nassar. Originally Divya Bharti was cast as the female lead but was replaced by Bhatt after her sudden and untimely death in 1993.

== Plot ==
The story centres on the life of Priyanka "Priya" Choudhary, a wealthy teenager whose father, Satyendra Pal Choudhary, is a rising politician associated with the Bharatiya Ekta Party. As Satyendra's popularity grows, he becomes increasingly concerned for his own safety and, more importantly, for his daughter's, prompting him to hire an Angrakshak (Bodyguard) named Ajay to act as Priya's personal bodyguard.

Ajay is fiercely protective of Priya, but as they spend time together, their professional relationship deepens into a romantic one, and the two fall in love. However, the political landscape is dangerous, and with elections approaching, Satyendra's growing influence threatens other powerful parties. This escalating tension leads to a devastating incident: Priya is kidnapped, and Ajay, in his valiant attempt to protect her, is severely wounded and hospitalized.

When the news of the kidnapping is made public, a massive wave of public sympathy shifts in Satyendra’s favor, virtually guaranteeing his election victory. The abductors demand a ransom of two crore rupees. Before Satyendra can respond, the police shockingly discover the body of a young woman, which is tragically presumed to be Priya’s. A grief-stricken Satyendra appears on national television, garnering an immense outpouring of support, and wins the election by a landslide.

However, the film takes a turn as Ajay recovers and refuses to accept Priya’s death, believing she is still alive. The remainder of the story focuses on Ajay's relentless pursuit to uncover the truth behind Priya’s disappearance and rescue her from her kidnappers. His investigation leads him through a tangled web of political deceit and criminal conspiracy, forcing him to confront dangerous adversaries. Ajay must rely on his training, courage, and love for Priya to solve the mystery of what truly happened and bring her home safely, ultimately seeking revenge against those who orchestrated the sinister plot.

== Cast ==
- Sunny Deol as Ajay – Priya’s bodyguard, later boyfriend.
- Pooja Bhatt as Priyanka "Priya" Choudhary – Ajay’s girlfriend.
- Saeed Jaffrey as Sanghvi, Priya’s uncle.
- Kulbhushan Kharbanda as Satyendra Pal Choudhary, Priya’s father.
- Nassar as Deva
- Rami Reddy as Velu Bhai
- Anees Bazmee as Velu’s subordinate
- Mohan Agashe as Khare
- Mohnish Behl as Vijay (special appearance)
- Amita Nangia as Asha
- Rana Jung Bahadur as ACP Jagan Pal

== Music and soundtrack ==
Anand–Milind composed the music of this film. Sameer penned the lyrics of the songs.

The song "Dil Mera Churane Laga" was quite popular when the album released, especially for Sunny Deol's dance moves. The tune of "Haule Haule Dil Dole" was inspired from the Telugu song "Malli Malli Idi Rani Roju" from the film Rakshasudu (1986), which was composed by Maestro Ilaiyaraaja. The tune of "Dil Mera Udaas Hai" was inspired from the Tamil song "Aasaiya Kathula" from the film Johnny (1980), which also was composed by Ilaiyaraaja.

#	Title	Singer(s)
1	"Haule Haule Dil Dole"	Udit Narayan, Alka Yagnik
2	"Dil Mera Churane Laga"	Kumar Sanu, Alka Yagnik
3	"Dil Mera Udaas Hai" (Male)	Kumar Sanu
4	"Padhna Likhna Chhodo"	Poornima
5	"Aa Ab Aa Sun Le Sada Dil Ki"	Alka Yagnik
6	"Suno Suno Pyar Hua" Not in the film	Abhijeet, Poornima
7	"Dil Mera Udaas Hai" (Female)	Poornima
