= Gavin Packard =

Indian actor (1964-2012)

- Born: 8 June 1964; Kalyan, Maharashtra, India
- Died: 18 May 2012 (aged 47); Vasai, Maharashtra, India
- Occupations: Actor; bodybuilder; personal trainer
- Years active: 1984 – 2004
- Children: Erika Packard Kamille Kyla Packard

Gavin Packard (8 June 1964 – 18 May 2012) was an Indian actor of Irish American descent, noted for the villainous roles he portrayed in many Bollywood films of the 1990s like Sadak, Mohra, Tadipaar and Chamatkar.

He had also acted in several Malayalam films like Aayushkalam, Season, Aanaval Mothiram and Aryan. He also appeared in the 1989 Doordarshan Sci-fi Series Indradhanush. He left the industry in the early 2000s.

== Personal life ==
He was the eldest of the five children of Earl and Barbara Packard. His father was a computer expert and his mother was a Konkani Maharashtrian. His grandfather John Packard was an Irish American who had come to Bangalore as a member of the US Army and chose to settle there. Packard was known for his physique and was a national and state award-winning bodybuilder. He was a personal trainer to Sanjay Dutt, Sunil Shetty and Shera, Salman Khan's bodyguard.

Packard and his wife mutually separated. Their two daughters are Erika Packard Kamille and Kyla Packard. Sanjay Dutt is the godfather of Kamille. His final years were spent with Daryl Packard, his younger brother, in Kalyan.

== Death ==
Packard died of respiratory disorder on 18 May 2012 and was buried at the St. Andrews Burial Grounds in Bandra the next day. Despite his long and notable cinematic career, the funeral was conspicuous by the absence of any one from the film industry. As per reports, Gavin had met with an accident while riding his bike at Kalyan Flower Market. He was severely injured in that accident.

== TV and music videos ==
- Shaktimaan (1998) (TV series)
- Nagraj (2001) as Professor Naagmani (Unaired TV Series)
- Cinderella (2004) (song from music album of the same name)

== Film career ==
He made his debut onscreen through the Malayalam movie Aryan in 1988 in which he played the role of Martin, a local goon in Mumbai. His debut in Bollywood came in 1989 through Ilaaka. That year he also played the full length character of Fabien in P Padmarajan's Season, arguably his best cinematic performance. His last film was Yeh Hai Jalwa released in 2002 and directed by David Dhawan. He acted in nearly 60 films in Hindi and Malayalam in a career that spanned nearly 15 years.

== Filmography ==
=== Hindi films ===
- Jaani Dushman (2002) as Referee
- Yeh Hai Jalwa (2002) as Man Hired To Beat Up Raju
- Kranti (2002) as Shiva, Students College president
- Kunwara (2000)
- Hadh Kar Di Aapne (2000) as Tourist Guide of Europe
- Baaghi (2000) as Zandu Pathan
- Kaala Samrajya (1999)
- Nyaydaata (1999)
- Maa Kasam (1999)
- Shera (1999) as Brownie
- Lo Main Aagaya (1999)
- Pardesi Babu (1998) as Wrestler
- Kudrat (1998) as Ravi's (Ravi Kishan) goon
- Bade Miyan Chhote Miyan (1998) as (As Gavin)
- Hitler (1998) as Tiger
- Gharwali Baharwali (1998) as White Guy Beaten By Arjun Singh (As Gavin)
- Sher-E-Hindustan (1998) as son of Choudhry
- Qahar (1997) as (As Gavin)
- Mrityudaata (1997) as Raja's Gang
- Yeshwant (1997) as Salim's goon
- Bhishma (1996) as Man Got Beaten By Bhola (As Gavin)
- Shastra (1996) as Gavin (College Punk)
- Khiladiyon Ka Khiladi (1996)
- Ek Tha Raja (1996) as Gavin
- Jurmana (1996) as Rona
- Muqadar (1996) as Gavin
- Vishwasghaat (1996) as Foreign Tiger
- Gaddaar (1995) as Fighter (White Guy) (As Gavin)
- Hulchul (1995) as Hitman
- Janam Kundli (1995) as Goreybhai
- Naajayaz (1995)
- Karan Arjun (1995) as Boxer (As Gavin)
- Aashique Mastane (1995) as Gavin
- Hum Hain Bemisaal (1994)
- Mohra (1994) as Mr Douglas
- Naaraaz (1994)
- Cheetah (1994) as Peter
- Tadipaar (1993)...Maharaani henchman Dream sequence (Special Appearance)
- Shatranj (1993) as Kevin
- Waqt Hamara Hai (1993) as Sambo
- Krishan Avtaar (1993) as Peter
- Platform (1993) as Cheetah
- Aankhen (1993) as Tejeshwar'S Henchman
- Jaagruti (1993) as Shiva
- Pehchaan (1993) as Yogi's henchman
- Anaam (1992) as Pasha'S Henchman (Uncredited)
- Deedar (1992) as (As Gavin)
- Tirangaa (1992) as (Uncredited)
- Qaid Mein Hai Bulbul (1992)
- Chamatkar (1992) as Goonga
- Jawaani (1984) as Drugs Peddler (Special Appearances)
- Nafrat Ki Aandhi as He-Man (1988)
- Na Insaafi (1989) as Tarzan
- Kahan Hai Kanoon (1989) Raghu
- Ilaaka (1989)
- Tridev (1989) as Mr Dunhill
- Thanedaar (1990) as Saudagar
- Fateh (1991)
- Patthar Ke Phool (1991) as Hitman (Uncredited)
- Saathi (1991) as Chikna
- Sadak (1991) as Maharani's Henchman

=== Malayalam ===
- Aryan (1988) as Martin
- Season (1989) as Fabian Ramirez
- Aanaval Mothiram (1991) as Alberto Fellini
- Aayushkalam (1992) as Benjamin Bruno
- Jackpot (1993) as Jerry Shroff
- Boxer (1995) as Mukerji Dayal

=== Bengali ===
- Jallaad (1995)

=== Telugu ===
- Bhadrachalam (2001) as Fighter
