= Chaahat (1996 film) =

1996 Indian film by Mahesh Bhatt

- Poster
- Directed by: Mahesh Bhatt
- Written by: Robin Bhatt; Akash Khurana; Javed Siddiqui
- Produced by: Robin Bhatt; Viral Lakhia
- Starring: Shah Rukh Khan; Pooja Bhatt; Naseeruddin Shah; Anupam Kher; Ramya Krishnan
- Cinematography: Ashok Behl
- Edited by: Bharat Singh
- Music by: Songs: Anu Malik; Score: Amar Haldipur
- Distributed by: Bhatt Productions
- Release date: 21 June 1996
- Running time: 146 minutes
- Country: India
- Language: Hindi

Chaahat (transl. Desire) is a 1996 Indian Hindi-language romantic action thriller film directed by Mahesh Bhatt. The film stars Shah Rukh Khan, Pooja Bhatt, Naseeruddin Shah, Ramya Krishnan, and Anupam Kher. Shah Rukh Khan acquired the rights of this film from Mahesh Bhatt in October 2013 under the banner, Red Chillies Entertainment. The film was remade in Odia as Prem Rogi in 2009.

== Plot ==
Roop Singh Rathore is a singer in Rajasthan just like his father, Shambunath Singh Rathod. Shambunath falls sick and needs immediate medical care in Bombay. Roop and his father immediately transfer to Bombay, where Roop finds work in a hotel owned by Ajay Narang. One day, while he is singing at Ajay Narang's hotel, Ajay's sister Reshma falls in love with Roop. Reshma is a spoiled girl and Ajay sees through all of her wishes. Unfortunately, Roop is in love with a nurse who works at the hospital his father is being treated at named Pooja. Meanwhile, Reshma becomes obsessed with Roop, and asks her brother to call him again to sing in their hotel. But when she sees that all the girls are flattered over Roop, she gets very jealous and asks him to sing only for her now from then onwards. However, Roop prefers to work for Ajay's rival, Patel, rather than take Reshma's offer. Ajay's obsession with keeping his sister happy at all costs comes into play and Patel is brutally beaten by him until he agrees to throw Roop out of his hotel. Desperately in need of money for his father's operation, Roop has no option but to work for Reshma and Ajay. Reshma slowly becomes creepily obsessed towards Roop, treating anyone that stands in the way of her love towards him. To protect her and his family, Roop decides it is best to break up with Pooja, despite her efforts to console him.

Shambunath's undergoes an operation, which goes well, but seeing Roop extremely unhappy with his new life saddens him, and he decides to leave Bombay. Roop later tries to leave Bombay himself, along with his father and Pooja, but his plans are interrupted when Reshma tries to commit suicide, causing Ajay to have an outburst of anger. Nevertheless, Pooja and Roop get married. Frustrated with such a turn of events, Reshma and her brother devise a plan to make their lives miserable. After tracking Roop, Shambunath, and Pooja down, Ajay puts Roop's father on gallows and a rope tied around his neck with Roop on his feet, leaves with Pooja, and asks Roop to save Pooja or his father. Although Roop refuses to leave his father in such a horrible situation, Roop's father kicks him, sacrificing himself so that he could save Pooja and his son could be happy. Roop sets out to save Pooja, which brings him to a party Ajay is throwing at his hotel. Roop crashes Ajay's party where Pooja is being held hostage. Ajay and Roop begin to fight and brawl, during which Reshma threatens to kill Pooja if Roop doesn't stop fighting with her brother. Ajay then tries to shoot Roop, but Pooja, who just sees him, pushes Roop out of the way and Reshma gets shot, getting killed. Ajay is left in a shocked and catatonic state, while Roop and Pooja escape.

The film ends with Roop and Pooja crying on a sidewalk, embracing each other bloodily and distressed.

== Cast ==
- Shah Rukh Khan as Roop Singh Rathod
- Pooja Bhatt as Nurse Pooja Singh Rathod, Roop's love interest and wife
- Naseeruddin Shah as Ajay Narang
- Anupam Kher as Shambunath Singh Rathod, Roop's father
- Ramya Krishnan as Reshma Narang, Ajay's sister
- Avtar Gill as Mama, Pooja's maternal uncle
- Mushtaq Khan as Anna
- Tiku Talsania as Traffic Cop
- Anant Jog as Minister K.K Singh
- Shrivallabh Vyas as Patel
- Omkar Kapoor as Vicky
- Amrit Patel as Chacha, Pooja's paternal uncle
- Naushaad Abbas as Fighter
- Pankaj Berry as Raja (cameo appearance)
- Razak Khan as Pooja's Brother (cameo appearance)
- Sharad Sankla as Charlie, Pooja's brother (cameo appearance)
- Laxmikant Berde as Bhaaji Rao (cameo appearance)

== Soundtrack ==
Chaahat

Soundtrack album by Anu Malik
- Released: 1996
- Genre: Feature film soundtrack
- Length: 48:41
- Label: Tips Music

The music of the album was composed by Anu Malik.

No.	Title	Lyrics	Singer(s)	Length
1.	"Chaahat Na Hoti"	Nida Fazli	Vinod Rathod and Alka Yagnik	08:04
2.	"Dil Ki Tanhai Ko"	Nida Fazli	Kumar Sanu	07:27
3.	"Kabhi Dil Se Kam"	Nida Fazli	Kumar Sanu and Sadhana Sargam	05:23
4.	"Nahin Jeena Yaar Bina"	Dev Kohli	Udit Narayan and Kavita Krishnamurthy	05:54
5.	"Nahin Lagta"	Nida Fazli	Udit Narayan and Alka Yagnik	06:57
6.	"Tumne Dikhaye Aise Sapne"	Neeraj Pathak	Vinod Rathod	06:40
7.	"Daddy Cool"	Maya Govind	Sudesh Bhosale and Devang Patel	08:22
Total length:				48:41

== Box office ==
Chaahat grossed ₹11.61 crore (US$1.2 million) in India and $250,000 (₹87.50 lakh) in other countries, for a worldwide total of ₹12.48 crore (US$1.3 million), against its ₹5.25 crore (US$560,000) budget. It had a worldwide opening weekend of ₹2.99 crore (US$320,000), and grossed ₹5.16 crore (US$550,000) in its first week. It is the 14th-highest-grossing film of 1996 worldwide.

=== India ===
It opened on Thursday, 6 June 1996, across 190 screens, and earned ₹61 lakh (US$65,000) nett on its opening day. It grossed ₹1.77 crore (US$190,000) nett in its opening weekend, and had a first week of ₹3.05 crore (US$330,000) nett. The film earned a total of ₹6.87 crore (US$730,000) nett, and was declared "Below Average" by Box Office India. It is the 15th-highest-grossing film of 1996 in India.

=== Overseas ===
It grossed $250,000 (₹87.50 lakh) outside India. Overseas, It is the 4th-highest-grossing film of 1996.
