= Mahesh Bhatt =

Indian director, producer, and screenwriter (born 1948)

- Bhatt in 2026
- Born: 20 September 1948 (age 78); Bombay, Bombay State, India
- Occupations: Filmmaker; screenwriter
- Spouses: Lorraine Bright (m. 1970); Soni Razdan (m. 1986)
- Children: 4 (see list below)
- Parents: Nanabhai Bhatt (father); Shirin Mohammad Ali (mother)
- Family: Bhatt family
- Awards: Full list

Signature
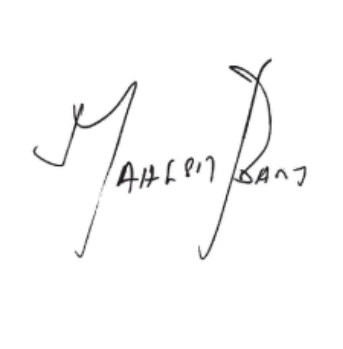

Mahesh Bhatt (pronounced [məˈɦeːʃ ˈbʱəʈ]; born 20 September 1948) is a retired Indian film director, producer and screenwriter who worked in Hindi cinema. Known for his unconventional narratives and exploration of bold themes, he was one of the most prominent filmmakers in 80s and 90s Hindi cinema. He has received a number of accolades, including five National Film Award and four Filmfare Awards.

The son of director Nanabhai Bhatt and actress Shirin Mohammad Ali. A notable film from his earlier period is Saaransh (1984), screened at the 14th Moscow International Film Festival. It became India's official entry for the Academy Award for Best Foreign Language Film for that year. The 1986 film Naam was his first piece of commercial cinema. In 1987, he turned producer with the film Kabzaa under the banner, Vishesh Films, with his younger brother Mukesh Bhatt. Later he went on to become one of the most recognized directors of the Indian film industry in the next decade, giving both art-house works such as Daddy (1989) and Swayam (1991), as well as commercial romantic hits, such as Aashiqui (1990) and Dil Hai Ki Manta Nahin (1991), in which he cast Pooja Bhatt with actor Aamir Khan. He next directed Sadak (1991) which was a hit and it remains his highest grossing either directed or produced by Vishesh Films.

During the 1990s Mahesh won critical acclaim for Sir (1993), along with other hits such as Gumraah (1993) and Criminal (1994). In 1994 he won the National Film Award – Special Jury Award for directing Hum Hain Rahi Pyar Ke (1993). In 1996, he directed Tamanna, which won the National Film Award for Best Film on Other Social Issues. In 1999, he directed the autobiographical Zakhm, which has garnered the Nargis Dutt Award for Best Feature Film on National Integration. Thereafter, Bhatt and his brother joined hands to establish Vishesh Films and then provided stories and screenplays for over twenty films, many of which were box-office successes. Bhatt has produced multiple contemporary films such as Raaz (2002), Jism (2003), Murder (2004), Gangster (2006), Awarapan (2007), Jannat (2008), Murder 2 (2011), and Aashiqui 2 (2013). Owing to differences between the brothers, Mukesh took over Vishesh Films and, in May 2021, it was publicly announced that Mahesh was no longer associated with the firm. In 2013, he was inducted into the Bollywood Walk of Fame, at Bandra Bandstand, where his hand print was preserved.

== Early life ==
Bhatt was born to Nanabhai Bhatt and Shirin Mohammad Ali. Bhatt's father was a Gujarati Hindu Nagar Brahmin and his mother was a Gujarati Muslim.

Among his siblings is the Indian film producer Mukesh Bhatt. Bhatt did his schooling from Don Bosco High School, Matunga. While still in school, Bhatt started summer jobs to earn money, while also making product advertisements. He was introduced to film director Raj Khosla through acquaintances. Bhatt thus started as an assistant director to Khosla.

== Film career ==
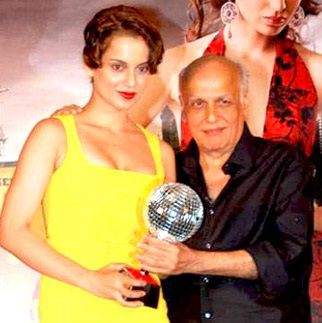
Bhatt with Kangana Ranaut at the success party for Once Upon A Time In Mumbaai in 2010

At the age of 26, Bhatt made his debut as a director with the film Manzilein Aur Bhi Hain starring Kabir Bedi and Prema Narayan in 1974. His 1979 Lahu Ke Do Rang, starring Shabana Azmi and Vinod Khanna in lead roles, won two Filmfare Awards in 1980: Helen received her first Filmfare as Best Supporting Actress and Madhukar Shinde won it for Best Art Direction. The film was also a box office hit. He was noticed and received great critical acclaim with art film Arth (1982), when he turned to his personal life for inspiration but doubt persists as to whether it is an original film.

Later, he made many more films taking insights from his personal life wherein he highlighted personal narratives ranging from out-of-wedlock birth to extramarital affair, and created critically acclaimed works such as Janam (1985) and Saaransh (1984), an exploration of an old couple's anxieties in a universe governed by arbitrary violence. Chander Uday Singh of India Today wrote, "Although Bhatt has used artistes with little cinematic experience (barring Hattangady and Phule) he draws superb performances from them. Kher stops short of being brilliant only because he occasionally lapses into a vigour out of keeping with the ageing and broken Pradhan. Hattangady, fresh from the success of Gandhi, remains convincing in the difficult role of Parvati." In a retrospective review on films 30th anniversary in 2014, Sukanya Verma of Rediff.com wrote, "Bhatt's finest film, which celebrates its 30th anniversary on May 25, isn't comfort cinema. Devoid of cheer and falsehoods, Saaransh is armed with a leading man like Anupam Kher who single-handedly enriches its story into an experience so personal, poignant and profound, only the callous can stay unmoved."

Bhatt had one of his biggest releases with musical romance film Aashiqui (1990), in collaboration with T-Series. The film launched Rahul Roy, Anu Aggarwal, and Deepak Tijori in the lead roles and became a major commercial success due to the hugely popular soundtrack by Nadeem–Shravan, which catapulted the music director duo into stardom. He launched his daughter Pooja Bhatt as a lead actress opposite Aamir Khan in Dil Hai Ki Manta Nahin (1991). The film was a commercial success and hugely acclaimed for its soundtrack. Bhatt's directorial Saathi (1991) was the only major success for Aditya Pancholi as a lead actor, thus giving a boost to his career. Bhatt's biggest release during that time was Sir (1993). The film launched Atul Agnihotri opposite Pooja Bhatt and Naseeruddin Shah was featured in the title role of an aspiring and dedicated teacher. The film was a commercial success and gained critical acclaim for Bhatt's direction and the acting of Shah, Pooja, Agnihotri, and Paresh Rawal. The film had an acclaimed and popular soundtrack by Anu Malik, which gave a boost to the music director's stellar career and he joined the league of top music directors of Bollywood. His next directed film was Gunaah (1993), which starred Sunny Deol and Dimple Kapadia.

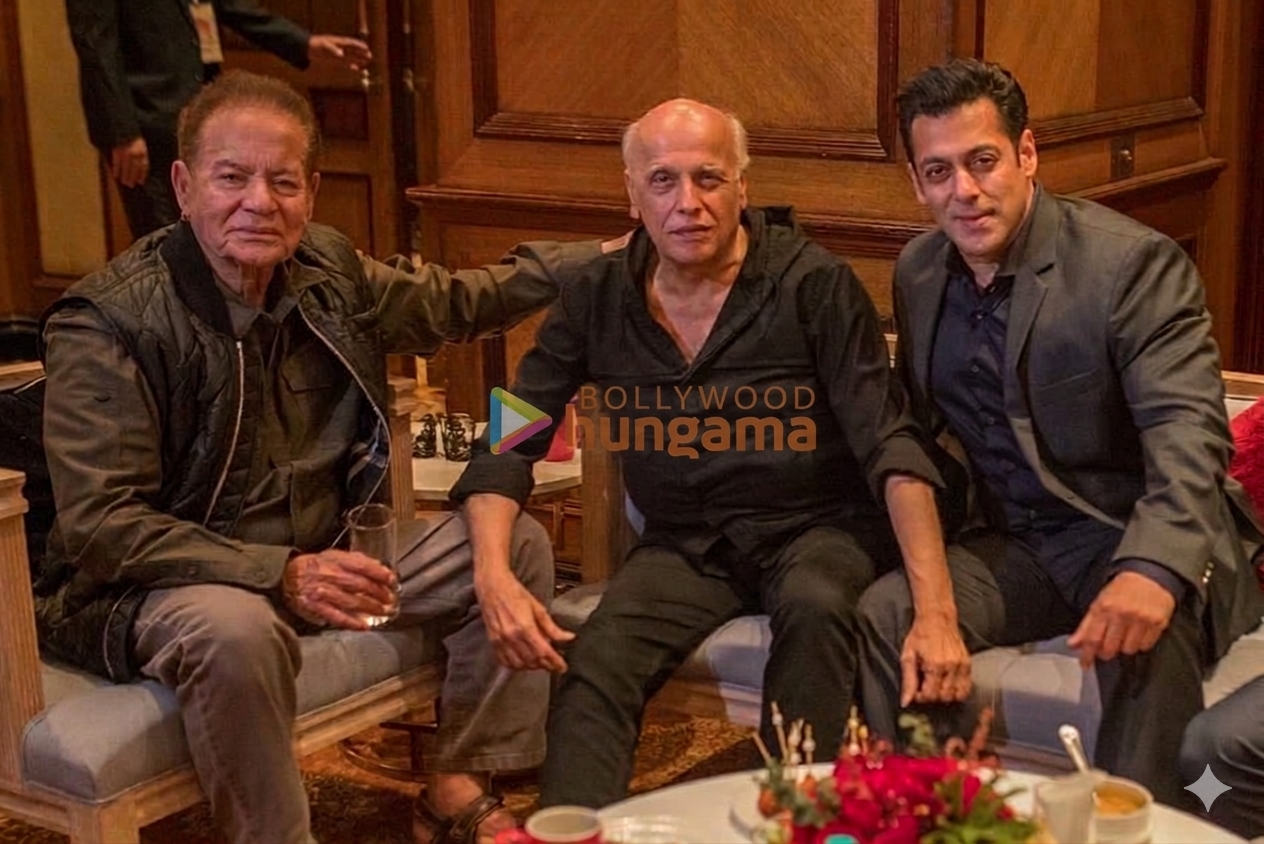
Bhatt with Salim Khan and Salman Khan at an event

In 1995 he moved to television, then a newly opening medium in India. He made two television series in 1995: the English language A Mouthful of Sky written by Ashok Banker and the popular Hindi language serial Swabhimaan scripted by the writer Shobha De. He directed another television series, Kabhie Kabhie, in 1997 which was written by Anurag Kashyap, Vinta Nanda and Kamlesh Kunti Singh. Following this, he directed dramas like Dastak (1996), the debut film of Miss Universe 1994-turned-actress Sushmita Sen, and Tamanna (1997), and tried his hand at comedy with Duplicate in 1998. Zakhm (1998) based on the Mumbai riots of 1993. Mukhtar Anjoom of Deccan Herald wrote that "Mahesh Bhatt foolishly swerves and rams the brakes while cruising along a solid theme. By making it personalized, he fails to tackle the wider ramifications of divisive politics and fritters away the opportunity to make a masterpiece of his swansong". His last film as director was Kartoos (1999) which did average business at the box office.

Thereafter, Bhatt retired as a director and took to screenwriting, churning out stories and screenplays for over twenty films, many of which were box-office successes, like Dushman, Raaz, Murder (2004), Gangster (2006), Woh Lamhe (2006), based on the life of actress Parveen Babi, along with many more. His banner vishesh films still continues operating today as one of Indian Cinemas leading production banners. Bhatt entered into the world of theatre with his protege Imran Zahid as of now he has produced three plays. The Last Salute, based on Muntadhar al-Zaidi's book of the same title, a journalist investigating atrocities Trial of Errors, that opened on 29 March 2013 in Delhi. stage adaptation of Bhatt of his movie, Arth (film). Bhatt also produced The Last Salute, a play directed by Arvind Gaur, based on Muntadhar al-Zaidi's book, starring Imran Zahid.

Bhatt made his directorial comeback with Sadak 2 (2020), a sequel to his crime film Sadak (1991). Due to the COVID-19 pandemic in India, the film did not release theatrically and was instead premiered on Disney+ Hotstar. The death of Sushant Singh Rajput in June 2020 sparked a nationwide debate on nepotism in the Hindi film industry. Following this, the film's trailer became the target of vote brigading on YouTube, becoming the second most-disliked video on the platform at the time. Some fans speculated that Rajput's death was linked to feelings of professional isolation allegedly caused by favoritism within the industry, leading to widespread criticism of industry figures, including Bhatt and his daughter Alia.

== Other professional work ==
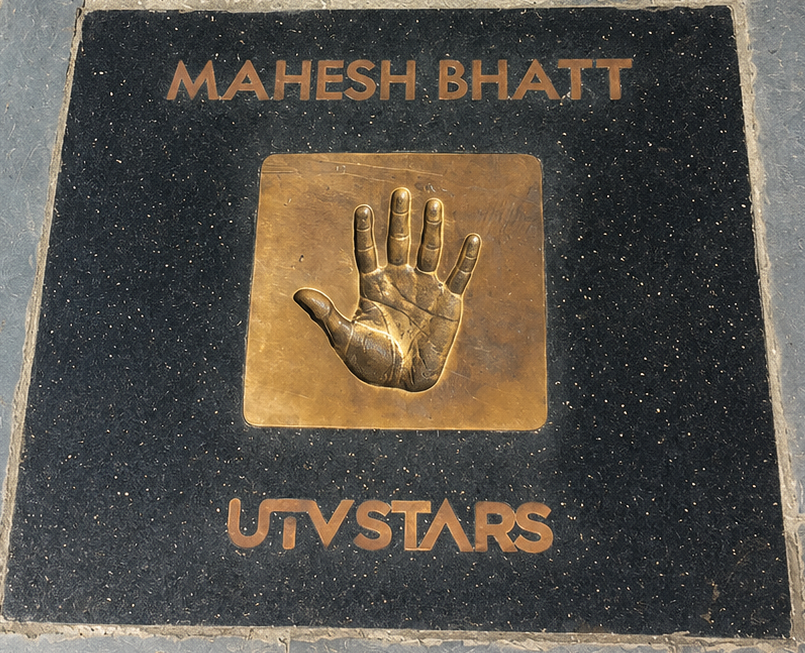
Bhatt's hand-print at the Bollywood Walk of Fame

Bhatt is co-owner of the film production house, Vishesh Films, with his brother, Mukesh Bhatt. However owing to differences between the brothers, Mukesh Bhatt took over Vishesh films and in May 2021, it was publicly announced that Mahesh Bhatt was no more associated with the firm. He is a member of the advisory board of U.S. nonprofit TeachAids.

He has hosted some episodes of two science magazine programmes - Turning Point and Imaging Science on Doordarshan in 1990s.

As of December 2018 Bhatt was a member of the Board of Patrons of the Mother Teresa Awards.

== Political views ==
Bhatt believes the Congress party is committed to secularism. In the 2014 Lok Sabha elections, he campaigned in a Karvan-e-Bedari (caravan of awareness) asking people to vote for Congress and defeat BJP's Prime Ministerial candidate Narendra Modi, as he believes that Modi is communal. Bhatt also criticizes the communal record of Congress Party, for its role in 1984 Sikh riots. He is planning to make a film, which will address the riots that took place in Delhi. Mahesh Bhatt supported the Islamic preacher Zakir Naik when the latter was denied entry into the United Kingdom for his controversial comments on terrorism.

== Personal life ==
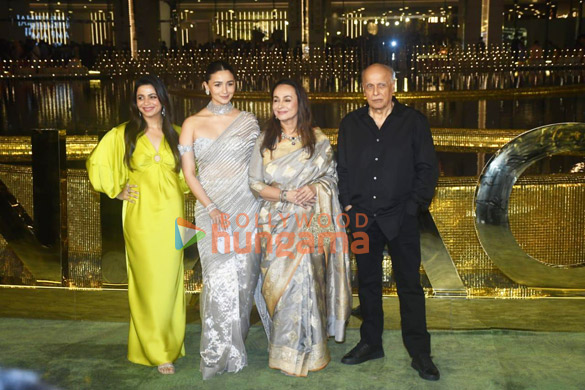
Mahesh Bhatt and his family attend the opening of the Nita Mukesh Ambani Cultural Centre

In 1970, Bhatt married Lorraine Bright (later name changed to Kiran Bhatt). His romance with her was the inspiration for his film Aashiqui. The couple's daughter Pooja Bhatt is a filmmaker and actress, and son Rahul Bhatt is an aspiring actor. Bhatt began an affair with 1970s actress, Parveen Babi. The affair did not last long, and Bhatt married Soni Razdan in 1986; to avoid Bhatt having to divorce his first wife, he converted to Islam prior to their wedding. They have two daughters, author Shaheen Bhatt and film actress Alia Bhatt. Hindi film actor Emraan Hashmi is his cousin Anwar's son, and filmmaker Milan Luthria is his mother Shirin's grand-nephew. He is the maternal uncle of film director Mohit Suri and former actress Smiley Suri.

In the 1970s, he became a follower of Osho, and later found spiritual companionship and guidance with philosopher, U. G. Krishnamurti. Bhatt calls Krishnamurti his lifeline and says "Take him away, and I am empty". Bhatt in 1992 wrote Krishnamurti's biography titled U.G. Krishnamurti, A Life. Apart from this he has edited several books based on conversations with U. G. Krishnamurti. Bhatt's latest book A Taste of Life: The Last Days of U.G. Krishnamurti was published in June 2009.

== Legacy ==
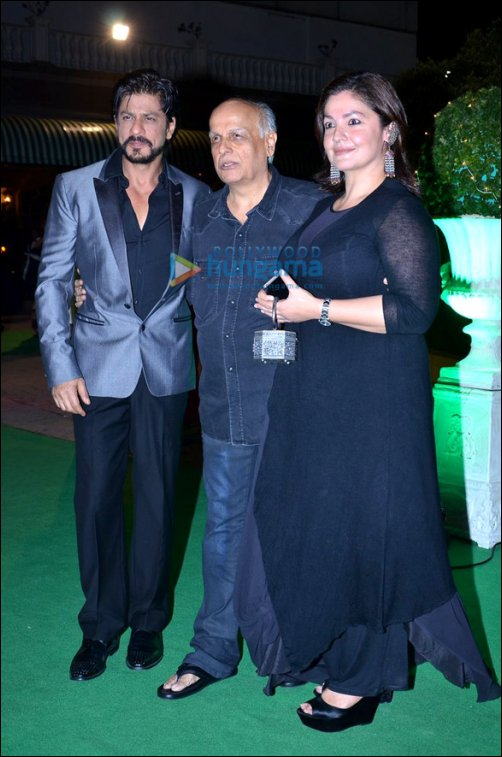
Bhatt with Shahrukh Khan and daughter Pooja Bhatt at the reception of nephew Vishesh Bhatt

As a director and producer, Mahesh Bhatt has a legacy of mentoring many actors and actresses and launching their careers, giving big names to Bollywood. He is notable for launching the careers of Anupam Kher in Saaransh (1984), Rahul Roy, Anu Aggarwal and Deepak Tijori in Aashiqui (1990), daughter Pooja Bhatt in Dil Hai Ki Manta Nahin and Sadak (1991), Atul Agnihotri in Sir (1993), Sonali Bendre in Naaraaz (1994), Samir Soni in A Mouthful of Sky (1995), Sushmita Sen, Manoj Bajpayee, Sharad Kapoor and Mukul Dev in Dastak (1996), Ashutosh Rana in Tamanna (1997), Dushman (1998) and Sangharsh (1999), Aftab Shivdasani in Kasoor (2001), Dino Morea and Bipasha Basu in Raaz (2002), Aparna Tilak in Footpath (2003), Emraan Hashmi in Footpath and Murder (2004), Mallika Sherawat in Murder (2004), Kunal Khemu in Kalyug (2005), Shiney Ahuja and Kangana Ranaut in Gangster and Woh Lamhe (both 2006) and Sunny Leone in Jism 2 (2012).

Bhatt has also given breakthrough to many stars, bringing turning point in their careers. These names include Sanjay Dutt and Kumar Gaurav in Naam (1986), Aditya Pancholi in Saathi (1991), Paresh Rawal in Sir (1993), and Shraddha Kapoor and Aditya Roy Kapoor in Aashiqui 2 (2013). Bhatt is also known for his choice of music. Nadeem–Shravan had their first hit album in Bollywood with Bhatt's directorial Aashiqui. They would collaborate with Bhatt in more films including Dil Hai Ki Manta Nahin, Sadak and Saathi (1991), Junoon (1992), Tadipaar and Hum Hain Rahi Pyar Ke (1993). Nadeem-Shravan went on to compose music for several productions of Vishesh Films.

== Filmography ==
=== Film ===
| Year | Films | Director | Producer | Writer |
|---|---|---|---|---|
| 1974 | Manzilein Aur Bhi Hain | Yes | | |
| 1978 | Vishwasghaat | Yes | | |
| 1978 | Naya Daur | Yes | | |
| 1979 | Lahu Ke Do Rang | Yes | | |
| 1980 | Abhimanyu | Yes | | |
| 1982 | Arth | Yes | | Yes |
| 1984 | Saaransh | Yes | | Yes |
| 1985 | Janam | Yes | | Yes |
| 1985 | Aashiana | Yes | | |
| 1986 | Naam | Yes | | |
| 1987 | Aaj | Yes | | |
| 1987 | Kaash | Yes | | Yes |
| 1987 | Thikaana | Yes | | |
| 1987 | Siyaasat | Yes | | |
| 1988 | Kabzaa | Yes | | |
| 1989 | Daddy | Yes | | |
| 1990 | Awaargi | Yes | | |
| 1990 | Jurm | Yes | | |
| 1990 | Aashiqui | Yes | | |
| 1991 | Haque | | Yes | Yes |
| 1991 | Swayam | Yes | | |
| 1991 | Saathi | Yes | | |
| 1991 | Dil Hai Ke Manta Nahin | Yes | | |
| 1991 | Sadak | Yes | | |
| 1991 | Saatwan Aasmaan | Yes | | |
| 1992 | Junoon | Yes | | |
| 1992 | Maarg | Yes | | |
| 1993 | Phir Teri Kahani Yaad Aayee | Yes | | |
| 1993 | Gunaah | Yes | | |
| 1993 | Sir | Yes | | |
| 1993 | Hum Hain Rahi Pyar Ke | Yes | | |
| 1993 | Gumrah | Yes | | |
| 1993 | Tadipaar | Yes | | |
| 1994 | The Gentleman | Yes | | Yes |
| 1994 | Naaraaz | Yes | | |
| 1994 | Criminal | Yes | | |
| 1995 | Milan | Yes | | |
| 1995 | Naajayaz | Yes | | |
| 1996 | Papa Kehte Hai | Yes | Yes | |
| 1996 | Chaahat | Yes | | |
| 1996 | Dastak | Yes | | |
| 1997 | Tamanna | Yes | | Yes |
| 1998 | Duplicate | Yes | | |
| 1998 | Dushman | | | Yes |
| 1998 | Angaaray | Yes | | |
| 1998 | Zakhm | Yes | | Yes |
| 1999 | Yeh Hai Mumbai Meri Jaan | Yes | | |
| 1999 | Kartoos | Yes | | |
| 1999 | Sangharsh | | | Yes |
| 2001 | Kasoor | | | Yes |
| 2002 | Raaz | | Yes | Yes |
| 2002 | Gunaah | | | Yes |
| 2003 | Jism | | | Yes |
| 2003 | Footpath | | Yes | Yes |
| 2003 | Inteha | | | Yes |
| 2005 | Rog | | | Yes |
| 2005 | Zeher | | | Yes |
| 2005 | Nazar | | | Yes |
| 2006 | Gangster: A Love Story | | Yes | Yes |
| 2006 | Woh Lamhe | | | Yes |
| 2009 | Jashnn | | Yes | |
| 2009 | Kajraare | | | Yes |
| 2009 | Tum Mile | | Yes | |
| 2011 | Murder 2 | | Yes | Yes |
| 2012 | Blood Money | | Yes | |
| 2012 | Jannat 2 | | Yes | |
| 2012 | Jism 2 | | | Yes |
| 2012 | Raaz 3: The Third Dimension | | Yes | |
| 2013 | Murder 3 | | Yes | Yes |
| 2013 | Aashiqui 2 | | Yes | |
| 2015 | Hamari Adhuri Kahani | | | Yes |
| 2016 | Love Games | | Yes | |
| 2018 | Jalebi | | Yes | |
| 2020 | Sadak 2 | Yes | | Yes |
| 2022 | Judaa Hoke Bhi | | | Yes |
| 2023 | 1920: Horrors of the Heart | | Yes | Yes |
| 2024 | Bloody Ishq | | Yes | Yes |
| 2025 | Tu Meri Poori Kahani | | Yes | Yes |

=== Television ===
| Year | Show | Director | Producer | Notes |
|---|---|---|---|---|
| 1995–1997 | Swabhimaan | Yes | | |
| 1995 | A Mouthful of Sky | Yes | | |
| 1997 | Kabhie Kabhie | Yes | | |
| 2014 | CEO's Got Talent | | | Judge |
| 2014–2019 | Udaan | | Yes | |
| 2015 | Khwaabon Ka Safar with Mahesh Bhatt | | Yes | Host |
| 2016–2018 | Naamkaran | Yes | Yes | |
| 2017–2018 | Tu Aashiqui | | Yes | |
| 2020 | Dil Jaise Dhadke... Dhadakne Do | | | Creator |
| 2022 | Pehchaan | | Yes | Also host |

== Awards ==
Bhatt won five National Film Award for Hum Hain Rahi Pyar Ke, Sardari Begum, Gudia, Tamanna, and Zakhm.
