= Pooja Bhatt =

Indian actress (born 1972)

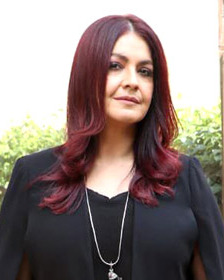
- Bhatt in 2019
- Born: 24 February 1972 (age 54); Bombay, Maharashtra, India
- Occupations: Actress; producer; director
- Years active: 1989–present
- Spouse: Manish Makhija (m. 2003; div. 2014)
- Father: Mahesh Bhatt
- Relatives: See Bhatt family

Pooja Bhatt (born 24 February 1972) is an Indian actress, director, and filmmaker who works in Hindi films. She established herself as one of the leading actresses of the 1990s and is the recipient of several accolades, including two National Film Awards and one Filmfare Award.

Born into the Bhatt family, she is the daughter of Indian filmmaker Mahesh Bhatt. Bhatt played her first leading role in Mahesh Bhatt's television film Daddy in 1989. For the film, she won the Filmfare Award for Best Female Debut. Her breakthrough came with the romance comedy Dil Hai Ke Manta Nahin (1991), which also emerged as her highest grossing release. In the following decade, she earned critical acclaim for her performances in the films Sadak (1991), Junoon (1992), Sir (1993), Naaraaz (1994), Angrakshak (1995), Chaahat (1996), Tamanna (1997), Border (1997), Kabhi Na Kabhi (1998), Angaaray (1998) and Zakhm (1998). This was followed by a hiatus and intermittent work.

== Early life ==
Pooja Bhatt was born on 24 February 1972 to Mahesh Bhatt and Kiran Bhatt (born Loraine Bright). On her father's side, Bhatt is of Gujarati descent and on her mother's side, she is of English, Scottish, Armenian, and Burmese ancestry. She is the step-daughter of Soni Razdan. She has a brother, Rahul Bhatt and younger half-sisters Shaheen Bhatt and Alia Bhatt. Her cousins include film director Mohit Suri, former actress Smiley Suri and actor Emraan Hashmi.

== Career ==
=== Debut and establishment (1989-1995) ===
Bhatt made her acting debut at age 17, in 1989 with Daddy, a TV film directed by her father Mahesh Bhatt. In the film, she portrayed a soul-searching teenage girl in an estranged relationship with her alcoholic father, played by actor Anupam Kher. Her performance in the film earned her the Filmfare Award for Best Female Debut. Her biggest solo hit and her big screen debut came with the romantic comedy Dil Hai Ke Manta Nahin (1991) opposite Aamir Khan, which is a remake of the Oscar-winning Hollywood classic It Happened One Night (1934). The film proved to be a breakthrough for Bhatt.

Her most well-known films in the 1990s include Sadak opposite Sanjay Dutt, one of the highest-grossing movies of the year 1991. The film was inspired by the 1976 American film Taxi Driver. Then in 1992 she was seen in Prem Deewane, directed by Sachin Pilgaonkar and produced by Ashok Ghai. The film was released in India on 12 June, and stars an ensemble cast including Jackie Shroff, Madhuri Dixit, Vivek Mushran, Manohar Singh, Ashalata Wabgaonkar, Prem Chopra and Kamal Chopra. In the same year, she starred in Junoon, reportedly inspired by the 1981 film An American Werewolf in London. The film was successful at the box office and received favourable reviews.

In 1993, she appeared in many films including Jaanam which is about a boy and girl from opposing families who meet and fall in love, determined not to let the hate between their parents stand in the way of their happiness and Phir Teri Kahani Yaad Aayee which was an Indian '90s melodious musical Hindi-language romance film. Both the films was widely appreciated by Critics. She then starred in Sir opposite debutant Atul Agnihotri. This film is about a peace-loving college professor Amar, who loses his son in a war break-out between the two gang leaders. The film was remade in Telugu as Gangmaster, with Rajasekhar. After that she appeared in Chor Aur Chaand opposite Aditya Pancholi. It is a love story with the backdrop of drugs and its effect on the youth of the nation. Although the film underperformed at the box office, it developed a significant cult following over the years since its release. Her next release was Ashutosh Gowariker's thriller Pehla Nasha, co-starring Deepak Tijori, Raveena Tandon, and Paresh Rawal. The movie is a remake of Brian de Palma's 1984 thriller Body Double. The film also has cameo appearances by Aamir Khan, Sudesh Berry, Rahul Roy, Shah Rukh Khan, Juhi Chawla and Saif Ali Khan as themselves. It remains the only film to have Aamir, Shah Rukh and Saif in a scene together along with Roy and Berry. Upon release, the film received negative reviews and failed at the box office. Bhatt's final release of 1993 was Mahesh Bhatt's romantic action film Tadipaar, with Mithun Chakraborty. The movie was released on the same day as Mithun's Shatranj and both went on to become hits based on Mithun's stupendous popularity at the time.

=== Further success and critical acclaim (1995-2001) ===
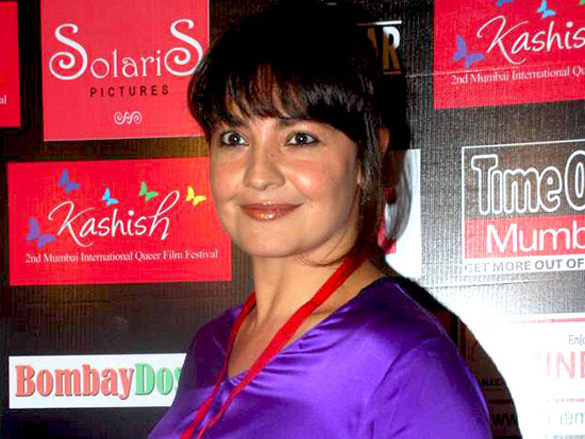
Pooja Bhatt at Queer Film Festival

After starring in many hit movies, she did many films including, Guneghar (1995) opposite Atul Agnihotri, and Naaraaz (1994) opposite Mithun Chakraborty, Hum Dono opposite Rishi Kapoor, Angrakshak opposite Sunny Deol (1995). Then in 1996 Bhatt, stars in Chaahat opposite Shah Rukh Khan, the film earned a total of ₹6.87 crore (US$710,000) nett, and was declared "Below Average" by Box Office India. It was the 15th-highest-grossing film of the year in India.

She next starred as an abandoned girl in the thriller film Tamanna, which marked her first production venture under her Pooja Bhatt Productions. It also won the National Film Award for Best Film on Other Social Issues. Bhatt began 1997 with a role in Jyoti Prakash Dutta’s ensemble drama Border, the film was released worldwide on 13 June 1997 with positive reviews from critics and garnered critical acclaim for its story, execution, scale, showing off the battle, direction, screenplay, performances and soundtrack. It opened to strong box office results, had a final domestic net total of ₹394 million (US$4.1 million) and was declared an all-time blockbuster by Box Office India. It also became the highest-grossing Hindi film of 1997 in India, but if according to worldwide, it was the second highest-grossing film of the year behind Dil To Pagal Hai. Border grossed a worldwide total of ₹655.7 million and it was the fourth biggest blockbuster film of the 90s decade.

Bhatt gained further success in 1998 with the film Zakhm, opposite Ajay Devgan, which won the Nargis Dutt Award for Best Feature Film on National Integration. Zakhm was based on the life of Mahesh Bhatt's mother Shirin Mohammad Ali, while she essayed her character in this film. The performance of Bhatt was well received, for which she received a Filmfare Award for Best Actress (Critics) nomination. Bhatt was also part of a film Angaaray, opposite Akshay Kumar and Nagarjuna. The movie was inspired by the American film State of Grace. The movie turned out to be a commercially successful. All these achievements established Bhatt as one of the most successful actresses of the year, according to Box Office India. In 2001 Bhatt starred in an English-language drama film Everybody Says I'm Fine!, which was written and directed by Rahul Bose. The film premiered on 12 September at the Toronto International Film Festival.

=== Career fluctuations and intermittent work (2003-present) ===
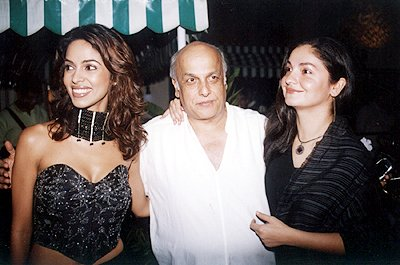
Bhatt (right) with her father Mahesh Bhatt and actress Mallika Sherawat in 2004.

From 2003 to 2012, she focused on producing and directing. She made her directorial debut with Paap in 2004, starring John Abraham and Udita Goswami. Since then, she has made four more directorial ventures: Holiday (2006), Dhokha (2007), Kajraare (2010) and Jism 2 (2012). Her last film appearance was in the romantic film Sanam Teri Kasam in 2009, opposite Saif Ali Khan and Atul Agnihotri.

In 2020, Bhatt returned to acting with Sadak 2, a sequel to the hit 1991 film. Her father returned to directing with this film after 20 years, while her half-sister Alia Bhatt also co-starred alongside her. It was released on 28 August 2020 on the streaming platform Disney+ Hotstar.

In 2021, Bhatt made her web series debut in the Netflix series Bombay Begums. It also features Amruta Subhash, Shahana Goswami, Plabita Borthakur, Aadhya Anand and Rahul Bose. It explores the lives of five ambitious women from various walks of life navigating through their dreams, desires and disappointments, from boardrooms to society's margins, in modern-day Mumbai. The series opened to mixed to positive responses from critics. Sayan Ghosh of The Hindu stated "Director Alankrita Shrivastava’s ability to navigate through various layers of suppressed anger and the emotional volatility of her characters make for a most engaging watch". Shubhra Gupta of The Indian Express stated "The most powerful element in Alankrita Srivastava's films is the recognition of women's desire, and how its absence can create permanent hollowness." Saibal Chatterjee of NDTV gave three-and-a-half out of five to the series and reviewed "Bombay Begums, created by Alankrita Shrivastava (Lipstick Under My Burkha), who shares screenwriting and directorial responsibilities with Bornila Chatterjee (The Hungry), strikes an instant chord because it strings together relatable, rooted stories." Saraswati Datar of The News Minute gave a review "Bombay Begums is an entertaining watch, but don't expect to feel moved or empowered after watching it." Rohan Naahar of Hindustan Times stated "Terrific performances by Pooja Bhatt, Amruta Subhash, Plabita Borthakur, Shahana Goswami and Manish Chaudhary smooth out the creases.

== Personal life ==
Bhatt married restaurateur Manish Makhija in 2003. The couple got divorced in 2014.

== Media image ==
Bhatt in 2018

In the '90s, Bhatt was often regarded as one of the most stylish and bold actresses in Bollywood. She appeared boldly in many magazine covers including Stardust, Cine Blitz, and Filmfare. In Rediff.com's "The Best Actresses" list of 2021, she ranked 10th. In the same year, PETA India named her as the Hero for Animals for her support for never using animals in films. In 2022, Bhatt joined Congress leader Rahul Gandhi's Bharat Jodo Yatra, which resumed in Hyderabad.

== Filmography ==
=== Filmmaker ===
Year	Film	Producer	Director	Production Designer
1997	Tamanna	Yes	No	No
1998	Dushman	Yes	No	No
1998	Zakhm	Yes	No	No
2002	Sur: The Melody of Life	Yes	No	No
2003	Jism	Yes	No	Yes
2003	Paap	Yes	Yes	Yes
2005	Rog	Yes	No	No
2006	Holiday	Yes	Yes	No
2007	Dhokha	No	Yes	No
2010	Kajraare	No	Yes	No
2012	Jism 2	Yes	Yes	No
2019	Cabaret	Yes	No	No

=== Acting roles ===
Year	Film	Role	Note
1989	Daddy	Pooja	Debut film; Won Best Female Debut
1991	Dil Hai Ki Manta Nahin	Pooja	
1991	Sadak	Pooja	
1992	Prem Deewane	Radha	
1992	Jaanam	Anjali	
1992	Saatwan Aasman	Pooja	
1992	Junoon	Nita	
1993	Phir Teri Kahani Yaad Aayee	Pooja	
1993	Sir	Pooja	
1993	Chor Aur Chaand	Reema	
1993	Pehla Nasha	Monica	
1993	Tadipaar	Mohini/Namkeen	
1994	Kranti Kshetra	Pooja	
1994	Naaraaz	Sonia	
1994	Boyfriend		Telugu film
1995	Gunehgar	Pooja Thakur	
1995	Hum Dono	Priyanka	
1995	Angrakshak	Priya	
1996	Kalloori Vaasal	Pooja	Tamil film
1996	Chaahat	Pooja	
1997	Tamanna	Tamanna	
1997	Border	Kammo	
1998	Yeh Aashiqui Meri	Anju	
1998	Kabhi Na Kabhi	Tina	
1998	Angaaray	Pooja	
1998	Zakhm	Mrs. Desai	
2001	Everybody Says I'm Fine!	Tanya	
2009	Sanam Teri Kasam	Seema Khanna	Delayed release
2020	Sadak 2	Pooja Verma	
2022	Chup: Revenge of The Artist	Zenobia Shroff	

=== Television ===
Year	Title	Role	Notes
2021	Bombay Begums	Rani Irani	
2023	Bigg Boss OTT 2	Contestant	4th runner-up
2024	Big Girls Don't Cry	Anita Verma	

== Awards and recognitions ==
Year	Award(s)	Category	Film(s)	Result
1990	36th Filmfare Awards	Best Female Debut	Daddy	Won
1992	Smita Patil Memorial Award	Best Actress	—N/a	Won
1992	Stardust Awards	Performer of the Year	—N/a	Won
1999	Bollywood Movie Awards	Best Actress (Critics)	Zakhm	Won
1999	Bollywood Movie Awards	Most Sensational Actress	—N/a	Nominated
1999	Sansui Viewers' Choice Movie Awards	Best Actress Critics	Zakhm	Nominated
1999	Zee Cine Awards	Best Actress (Jury)	Zakhm	Nominated
1999	Filmfare Awards	Best Actress Critics	Zakhm	Nominated
1999	Screen Awards	Best Actress	Zakhm	Nominated
1999	Screen Awards	Face of the Year	Zakhm	Won
1999	44th National Film Awards	Best Film on Other Social Issues	Tamanna	Won
1999	46th National Film Awards	Nargis Dutt Award for Best Feature Film on National Integration	Zakhm	Won
1999	Bengal Film Journalists' Association Awards	Best Actress (Hindi)	Zakhm	Won
2004	Zee Cine Awards	Best Debut Director	Paap	Nominated
2004	Star Guild Awards	Best Debut Director	Paap	Nominated
