= Jaanam =

- Poster for Jaanam
- Directed by: Vikram Bhatt
- Written by: Jay Dixit
- Produced by: Mukesh Bhatt
- Starring: Rahul Roy; Pooja Bhatt; Paresh Rawal
- Cinematography: Jagdish Nivergi
- Edited by: Sanjay Sankla
- Music by: Anu Malik
- Production company: Vishesh Films
- Release date: 26 November 1993 (India)
- Country: India
- Language: Hindi

Jaanam is a 1993 Indian Hindi-language film directed by debutante Vikram Bhatt. It stars Rahul Roy and Pooja Bhatt and Paresh Rawal. It has a soundtrack by Anu Malik.

== Plot summary ==
Paradise Builders is owned by Dhanraj, who lives a very wealthy lifestyle with his wife, Radha; son, Rajan; and daughter, Anjali. His aim is to take possession of the nearby village, which is now occupied by fishermen, headed by Shankar Rao, who lives there with his wife and two sons, Amar and Arun. Dhanraj's attempts to take possession prove to be in vain. Then the inevitable happens when Amar and Anjali meet and fall in love with each other, much to the chagrin of both Shankar and Dhanraj. While Shankar wants Amar to continue to follow his profession, Dhanraj wants Anjali to wed U.S.-based Shekhar Gupta, the son of the owner of Gupta Investments. Push leads to shove, and Dhanraj asks Rajan to set fire to the village. As a result, Rajan and Arun get killed. A grief-stricken Dhanraj swears on his son's ashes that he will avenge this death by killing Amar - at any and all costs. Watch what impact this has on the Rao family, as well as on Amar and Anjali.

== Cast ==
- Rahul Roy as Amar S. Rao
- Pooja Bhatt as Anjali Bhatt
- Paresh Rawal as Shankar Rao
- Ashutosh Gowariker as Arun S. Rao
- Sulabha Arya as Kamla
- Avtar Gill as Police Inspector
- Vikram Gokhale as Dhanraj
- Pavan Malhotra as Rajan
- Reema Lagoo as Shankar's wife
- Nandita Thakur as Radha
- Satyajit Jha as Kadam
- Anant Jog

== Soundtrack ==
The Songs of the movie were composed by Anu Malik. Soundtrack provided by T-Series.

#	Title	Singer(s)	Lyricist(s)
1	"Pagalpan Chha Gaya Dil Tumpe Aa Gaya"	Vipin Sachdeva, Anuradha Paudwal	Faaiz Anwar
2	"Teri Chahat Ke Siva Jaanam Meri"	Amit Kumar, Anuradha Paudwal	Faaiz Anwar
3	"Mere Dil Ka Pata Tumhein Kisne Diya"	Vipin Sachdeva, Anuradha Paudwal	Faaiz Anwar
4	"Dil Jigar Ke Jaan Achchha Hai"	Amit Kumar, Anuradha Paudwal	Rahat Indori
5	"Dil Kyon Dhadakta Hai Kyon Pyar Hota Hai"	Vipin Sachdeva, Anuradha Paudwal	Faaiz Anwar
6	"Maari Gayi"	Anu Malik, Anuradha Paudwal	Qateel Shifai
7	"Ek Zindagi Guzar Gayi" (Female)	Anuradha Paudwal	Faaiz Anwar
8	"Ek Zindagi Guzar Gayi" (Male)	Vipin Sachdeva	Faaiz Anwar
9	"Patte Patte Par Dil"	Vipin Sachdeva, Anuradha Paudwal	Indeevar
