= Nida Fazli =

Indian poet, lyricist and dialogue writer (1938–2016)

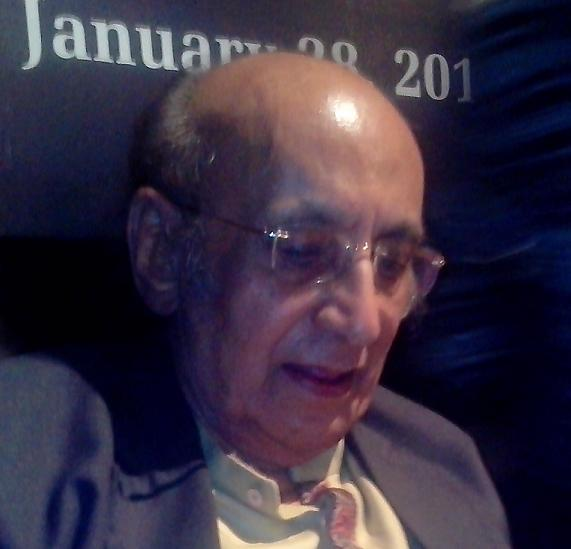
- Fazli in Chandigarh, 28 January 2014
- Born: Muqtida Hasan Nida Fazli; 12 October 1938; Delhi, British India
- Died: 8 February 2016 (aged 77); Mumbai, Maharashtra, India
- Occupations: Poet; novelist; lyricist
- Children: Tehreer
- Relatives: Tasleem Fazli, Saba Fazli
- Writing career
- Language: Urdu, Hindi
- Notable awards: Padma Shri Award, Sahitya Akademi Award, Bollywood Movie Award, Indian Telly Award

Muqtida Hasan Nida Fazli, known as Nida Fazli (12 October 1938 – 8 February 2016), was a prominent Indian Urdu and Hindi poet, lyricist and dialogue writer. He was awarded the Padma Shri in 2013 by the government of India for his contribution to literature.

== Early life and background ==
Born in New Delhi, into a muslim family, Nida Fazli grew up in Gwalior, where he attended school and subsequently studied English literature. His father was also a very well known Urdu poet. Two of his other brothers mainly; Tasleem Fazli and Saba Fazli too were prominent names, their contribution to literature through films, poetry and songs are still cherished today by their admirers both from India and Pakistan.

In 1965, eighteen years after the partition of India, his parents and other family members migrated to Pakistan. He however decided to stay back in India. This happened one year after Fazli had moved from Gwalior to Mumbai (in 1964) to earn a living. This departure of his parents was an epochal event in his life, the pain and repercussions of which would remain with him all his life.

Fazli was married twice. His second wife was Malti Joshi. They became the parents of a daughter, Tehreer.

== Career ==
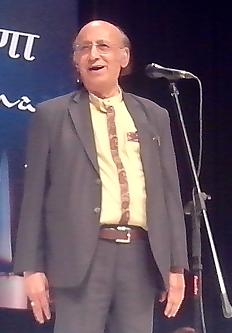
Fazli reciting at Jashn-e-Haryana in Chandigarh, 28 January 2014

While still young, Fazli was passing by a Hindu temple where a bhajan singer was singing a composition of Surdas about Radha sharing her sorrow with her maids at being separated from her beloved Krishna. The poetic beauty of the Pad, relating to the close rapport and bonding between human beings, inspired Nida to begin writing poems.

During that period, he felt that there were limitations in Urdu poetry. He absorbed the essence of Mir and Ghalib to express what he intended. He was fascinated by the lyrical mood of Meera and Kabir and widened his knowledge of poetry by studying T. S. Eliot, Gogol and Anton Chekhov.

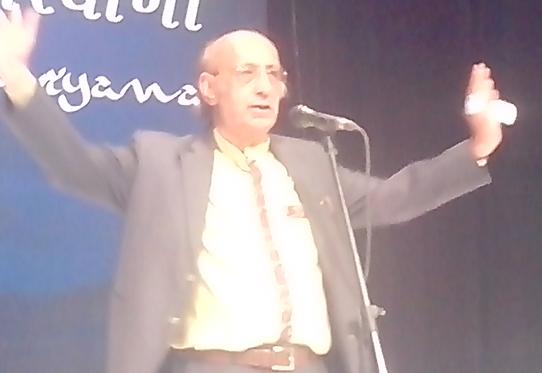
Nida Fazli

He moved to Mumbai in search of a job in 1964. In the early days of his career, he wrote in Dharmayug and Blitz . His poetic style attracted the notice of filmmakers and writers of Hindi and Urdu literature. He was often invited to Mushairas, the prestigious recitation sessions of one's own poetry. He became known among readers and ghazal singers for his elegant presentation and exclusive use of colloquial language for ghazals, dohaas and nazms, while avoiding ornate Persian imagery and compound words to simplify his poetry. He wrote the famous couplet: 'Duniya jise kehte hain jaadu kaa Khilona hai Mil jaaye to mitti hai kho jaaye to sona hai'. Some of his famous film songs include Aa bhi jaa (Sur), Tu is tarah se meri zindagi mein (Aap To Aise Na The) and Hosh waalon ko khabar Kya (Sarfarosh). He wrote essays critical of contemporary poets of the sixties in his book Mulaqatein which outraged poets including Sahir Ludhianvi, Ali Sardar Jafri and Kaifi Azmi. As a result, he was boycotted in some poetic sessions. His career improved when Kamal Amrohi, a filmmaker, approached him. The original songwriter Jan Nisar Akhtar working on the film Razia Sultan (1983) had died before completing the project. Nida wrote the final two songs and attracted other Hindi filmmakers.

His celebrated lyrics were also used in Aap to aise na the, Is Raat Ki Subah Nahin (1996) and Gudiya. He wrote the title song of TV serials like Sailaab, Neem ka Ped, Jaane Kya Baat Hui and Jyoti. The composition "Koi Akelaa Kahaan" is another popular composition sung by Kavita Krishnamurthy. His ghazals and other compositions are sung by notable artists of the day. He teamed up with Jagjit Singh in 1994 to bring an album named Insight, which got appreciation for its soulful poetry and music. Shortly before his death he wrote columns for BBC Hindi website on various contemporary issues and literature. Mirza Ghalib's works were often mentioned by him.

== Style ==
Nida Fazli is a poet of various moods and to him the creative sentiment and inner urge are the sources of poetry. He thinks that the feeling of a poet is similar to an artist: like a painter or a musician. In contrast he found lyric writing a mechanical job as he had to fulfil the demands of the script and the director. Later he accepted the practical necessity of money which comes from lyric writing and helps one to ponder on creative work.

He published his first collection of Urdu poetry in 1969. Childhood imagery persistently reflects in his poetry as elements of nostalgia. Primary themes which run through his poetry are contradictions in life, the search for purpose, nuances of human relationships, differences between practice and preaching, and the groping for that which is lost.

== Contribution towards communal harmony ==
Nida Fazli disagreed with the partition of India and has spoken out against the communal riots, politicians and fundamentalism. During the riots of December 1992 he had to take shelter in his friend's house due to security concerns.

He was honoured with the National Harmony Award for writing on communal harmony. He wrote 24 books in Urdu, Hindi and Gujarati — some of which are assigned as school textbooks in Maharashtra. Some of his works are also present in National Council of Educational Research and Training Hindi textbooks which millions of students study. He received the Mir Taqi Mir award for his autobiographical novel Deewaron Ke Bich from the Government of Madhya Pradesh.

== Death ==
Fazli died of a heart attack on 8 February 2016. He was aged 77 when he died. His death occurred on the 75th birth anniversary of the Ghazal singer Jagjit Singh, with whom he worked for many songs.

== List of works ==
=== Poetry collections ===
- Lafzun Ka Pul
- Mor Naach
- Aankh Aur Khawaab Ke Darmayan
- Khoya Huwa Sa Kuch
- Shehar Mere Sath Chal
- Zindagi Ki Tadap
- Sab Ka Hai Maahtaab
- Duniya Jise Kehte Hain
- Shehar Mein Gavaun (Kuliyaat)

=== Prose collections ===
- Mulaqatein
- Deewaron Ke Beech (autobiography part 1)
- Deewaron Ke Par (autobiography part 2)
- Chehre
- Dunya Mere Aage

== Awards ==
- 1998: Sahitya Akademi Award in Urdu for Khoya Hua Sa Kuchh (Poetry Collection)
- 2003: Star Screen Award for Best Lyricist for Sur
- 2003: Bollywood Movie Award - Best Lyricist for Aa Bhi Ja from Sur
- 2013: Padma Shri; the Government of India.

== Filmography ==
=== As lyricist ===
- Aap To Aise Na The (1980)
- Red Rose (1980)
- Nakhuda (1981)
- Harjaee (1981)
- Anokha Bandhan (1982)
- Razia Sultan (1983)
- Vijay (1988)
- Sajda (1991)
- Chaahat (1996)
- Is Raat Ki Subah Nahin (1996)
- Tamanna (1997) - "Ghar Se Masjid"
- Sarfarosh (1999) - "Hoshwalon Ko Khabar Kya"
- Sur – The Melody of Life (2002) - "Aa Bhi Ja Aa Bhi Ja"
- Dev (2004)
- Yatra (2006)

=== As dialogue writer ===
- Dev (2004) (co-writer)
- Yatra (2006)
