= Akshay Anand =

Indian actor (born 1969)

- Born: John Gardner; Delhi, India
- Occupation: Actor
- Years active: 1985–present
- Spouse: Roma Gardner

John Gardner, known professionally as Akshay Anand is an Indian actor who appears mainly in Hindi films and television.

== Early life and career ==
Anand was born as John Gardner, a relative of British colonial officer William Linnæus Gardner, and he assumed the name Akshay inspired by his character in his television debut Indradhanush. The name Anand had been given to him by his mentor, actor and director Dev Anand, during his association with Dev Anand while filming Hum Naujawan. He studied economics at St. Xavier's College, Mumbai before getting into acting.

His television debut was made in 1989 with the 13-episode TV series Indradhanush which was based on time travel.

He also mentors at his acting academy, Akshay Anand Acting Academy. He is also active as producer and director for various web series under the banner Akshay Anand Academy Production.

== Filmography ==
=== Films ===
Year	Show	Role	Notes
1985	Hum Naujawan	Johnny Gardner	Uncredited
1991	Do Pal		
1992	Umar 55 Ki Dil Bachpan Ka		
1993	Pyaar Ka Tarana		
1996	Hahakaar	Rakesh	
1996	America! America!!	Shashank	Kannada film
1996	Aur Ek Prem Kahani	Govindram Dinanath Vijaykumar Shastri	
1996	Spotboy		
1996	Indraprastham	Kiran Verma	Malayalam film
1997	Tamanna	Jugal Chopra	
1997	Daava	Suraj	
1997	Abhaas		
1998	Zakhm	Anand	
1998	Yeh Hai Mumbai Meri Jaan	David Rathod / Jo Jo Vaswani	
1998	Ghulam	Harihar Mafatlal	
2000	Aaghaaz	Harish Patel	
2002	23rd March 1931: Shaheed	Ram Prasad Bismil	
2004	Agnipankh	Flight Engineer	
2004	Uuf Kya Jaadoo Mohabbat Hai	Raj Chaudhry	
2011	Ladies vs Ricky Bahl	Raina's colleague	
2012	Student Of The Year	Dharmraj Singh	
2018	Jaane Kyun De Yaaron	Ajay Suryavanshi	
2019	Cabaret	Victor (Roza's manager)	
2020	Sadak 2	John	
2024	A Wedding Story		
2025	Azaad	Biru	

== Television ==
Year	Serial	Role
1989	Indradhanush	Balachandran "Bala" Krishnamurthy
1995-2001	Aahat	
1997–1998	Chattaan	Ajay Raj
1998	Teacher	Jatin
1997–1998	Saturday Suspense	Arvind Khanna (Episode 1)
1997–1998	Saturday Suspense	Inspector Avinash (Episode 9)
1997–1998	Saturday Suspense	Inspector Avinash (Episode 36)
1997–1998	Saturday Suspense	Inspector Avinash (Episode 58)
1997–1999	Thoda Hai Thode Ki Zaroorat Hai	
1999	Gubbare	
1999	Zee Horror Show	
1999	Rishtey	Anand (Episode 52)
1999	Rishtey	Sameer (Episode 55)
1999	Rishtey	Avinash (Episode 79)
1999	Suspense Hour	Abhishek (Abhi) Upadhyay (Episode 1)
1999	Suspense Hour	Rahul Verma (Episode 12)
2000–2001	Saamne Wali Khidki	Amit
2000–2001	Choodiyan	Meghna's Lover
2001	Hamare Tumhare	Ketan
2001–2002	Choti Maa - Ek Anokha Bandhan	Raghu
2002–2003	Achanak 37 Saal Baad	Rahul's Father
2002–2006	Astitva...Ek Prem Kahani	Anil Shourey
2004	Krishna Arjun	Raj Malhotra / Aseem Bose (Episode 98 & Episode 99)
2004	Raat Hone Ko Hai	Anil (Episode 13 – Episode 16)
2004–2005	Chi and Me	Rahul Saxena
2004–2005	Baal Baal Bacche	Akshay
2005	Kehta Hai Dil	S.P. Adityapratap Singh
2005–2006	Kkavyanjali	Aman Kapoor
2005–2009	Saat Phere: Saloni Ka Safar	Brijesh Singh
2006-2007	Dil Se Door Dil Ke Paas	Pranav
2007	Viraasat	Rohan Lamba
2007–2009	Babul Ki Bitiya Chali Doli Saja Ke	Vikram Kapoor
2008	Neelanjana	Rohit
2009	Basera	Aatish
2010–2011	Kaali- Ek Agnipariksha	Amar
2011	Behenein	Jay Mehta
2011–2012	Beend Banoongaa Ghodi Chadhunga	Mr. Poddar
2012–2013	Suvreen Guggal - Topper Of The Year	Baldev Guggal
2014–2015	Balika Vadhu	Anup Shekhar
2015–2016	Ek Tha Raja Ek Thi Rani	Kunwar Chandravardhan Singh Deo
2017	Kya Qusoor Hai Amala Ka?	Advocate Viren Asthana
2017	Saam Daam Dand Bhed	Prabhat Namdhari
2020–2021	Ek Duje Ke Vaaste 2	Devraj Malhotra
2022	Ali Baba: Dastaan-E-Kabul	Sultan Shah Zuhaid
2023	Vanshaj	Premraj "Prem" Mahajan
2024	Jubilee Talkies	
2024–2025	Megha Barsenge	Surinder Khurana
2025	Chakravarti Samrat Prithviraj Chauhan	Jagaddeva
