= Sadak =

1991 Indian film by Mahesh Bhatt

- Theatrical release poster
- Directed by: Mahesh Bhatt
- Written by: Robin Bhatt
- Produced by: Mukesh Bhatt
- Starring: Sanjay Dutt; Pooja Bhatt; Deepak Tijori; Sadashiv Amrapurkar; Avtar Gill; Neelima Azeem; Soni Razdan
- Cinematography: Pravin Bhatt
- Edited by: A Muthu
- Music by: Nadeem-Shravan
- Production company: Vishesh Films
- Release date: 20 December 1991
- Running time: 127 minutes
- Country: India
- Language: Hindi
- Budget: ₹2.70 crore
- Box office: ₹10.8 crore

Sadak (Hindi pronunciation: [sə.ɽək]; transl. Road) is a 1991 Indian Hindi-language romantic action thriller film directed by Mahesh Bhatt. It stars Sanjay Dutt and Pooja Bhatt. The film is one of the highest-grossing movies of the year 1991. It is an unofficial remake of 1976 American film Taxi Driver. This film was remade in Tamil as Appu (2000). A sequel, Sadak 2, was released on 28 August 2020 on Disney+ Hotstar, to extremely negative reviews.

== Plot ==
Maharani, a transgender brothel owner, runs a sex trafficking operation in Bombay. She employs several women including Pooja and Chanda. Ravi Kishore Verma, a taxi driver, meets Pooja before she is taken in by Maharani, and his friend Gotya is in love with Chanda. Ravi previously witnessed his sister Roopa plunge to death after being diagnosed with STD. She had eloped with her lover who sold her off at a brothel and forced her to become a prostitute. The incident leaves Ravi emotionally disturbed and plagued by insomnia and violent episodes.

One day, Ravi meets Inspector Irani, a police officer he recognizes from a newspaper article. He gives Irani a ride and refuses payment. The officer tells him to reach out if he ever needs help.

Ravi meets Pooja again as she tries to flee the brothel of Maharani and tries to help her in vain. He procures his life's savings, a meager sum of thirty thousand rupees from Salim Bhai, his taxi's owner and takes out Pooja for one night, posing as her customer. He does so with the help of his friend, Gotya, and a pimp, Gullu. Gotya, however, is held as collateral under Maharani's orders in case Pooja is not safely returned. They roam around Bombay and spend some romantic time with each other, during which Ravi tells Pooja that he loves her and will keep on coming back to the brothel for her every night (presumably—so that she is not sold to other customers).

The next night, Ravi mortgages the taxi and goes back to the brothel. He is, however, chided by Maharani who suspects he's either mad or in love with Pooja for offering high sums of money for her on consecutive nights. She also tells Ravi that since she has been running this business for the past thirty years, she knew when Pooja came back in the morning that Ravi did not sleep with her. After much argument and requests from Ravi and Gotya, Maharani agrees to let him spend the night with Pooja under the condition that he has sex with Pooja in front of her. Ravi agrees, but stabs Maharani, escaping with Pooja in the ensuing chaos. Gotya also grabs his girlfriend Chanda and escapes. They run away to a distant location where Gotya and Chanda get married in a temple with the blessings of Ravi and Pooja. All four come back and take refuge with Salim Bhai.

In the meantime, Maharani's henchmen find the pimp and break his legs. Salim Bhai advises Ravi and Gotya to enlist police protection and Ravi decides to approach Inspector Irani. He assures them of his help and asks them to meet him in the parking lot of an apartment complex at a scheduled time. However, when the four reach there, Maharani and her henchmen are already waiting and attack them with firearms. As the four try to escape, Gotya and Chanda are both shot and Ravi manages to escape with Pooja in Irani's police jeep. Once they reach safety, he calls up Irani and warns him that he will have to pay heavily for his betrayal.

Pooja is, however, captured again by Maharani, after Ravi is tortured and left for dead. Ravi, remembering that the fate of his sister and Pooja are the same, regains his lost strength. He fights his way back to Maharani by killing Inspector Irani and setting ablaze Maharani's brothel, finally killing Maharani and rescuing Pooja. Ravi is jailed for taking law into his hands. After his release from jail, Pooja and Ravi are united again.

== Cast ==
- Sanjay Dutt as Ravi Kishore Verma
- Pooja Bhatt as Pooja
- Deepak Tijori as Gotya
- Sadashiv Amrapurkar as Maharani, the 'eunuch' brothel madam
- Neelima Azeem as Chanda
- Avtar Gill as Salim Bhai
- Pankaj Dheer as Police Inspector Irani
- Gavin Packard as Maharani's Henchman, Peter Salar
- Mushtaq Khan as Gullu, a Dalal in red light area
- Manohar Singh as Nanaji
- G.P. Singh
- Arun Govil
- Javed Khan Amrohi as Pakya
- Soni Razdan as Roopa, sister of Ravi
- Jahangir Khan as Chikna, Maharani's man at her brothel

== Soundtrack ==
Sadak

Soundtrack album by Nadeem Shravan
- Released: 1991
- Recorded: 1991
- Genres: Bollywood feature film soundtrack; Filmi-ghazal
- Length: 60:09
- Label: T-Series
- Producer: Nadeem Shravan

Nadeem Shravan chronology
Pyaar Ka Saaya (1991)	Sadak (1991)	Dil Ka Kya Kasoor (1992)

The soundtrack of the movie is composed by the music duo Nadeem Shravan. All songs were sung by Anuradha Paudwal along with Kumar Sanu, Abhijeet Bhattacharya, Manhar Udhas, Debashish Dasgupta, Junaid Akhtar & Babla Mehta.

The film's soundtrack album sold 5 million units, becoming one of the top three best-selling Bollywood soundtracks of the year. The song "Tumhein Apna Banaane Ki" is a popular number till date. However, it was a remake of the famous song Chale To Kat Hi Jayega Safar by Pakistani singer Musarrat Nazir. In turn, a remade version of the song was used for the 2015 film Hate Story 3. The soundtrack was #51 on the list of "100 Greatest Bollywood Soundtracks of All Time", as compiled by Planet Bollywood.

#	Title	Singer(s)
1.	"Tumhein Apna Banane Ki"	Anuradha Paudwal, Kumar Sanu
2.	"Hum Tere Bin Kahin"	Anuradha Paudwal, Manhar Udhas
3.	"Jab Jab Pyar Pe Pehra"	Anuradha Paudwal, Kumar Sanu
4.	"Zamane Ke Dekhein Hain Rang Hazaar" (Female)	Anuradha Paudwal
5.	"Mohabbat Ki Hai Tumhare Liye"	Anuradha Paudwal, Kumar Sanu
6.	"Tumhein Apna Banane Ki" (Female)	Anuradha Paudwal
7.	"Tak Dhin Dhin Tak"	Anuradha Paudwal, Babla Mehta, Kumar Sanu
8.	"Zamane Ke Dekhein Hain Rang Hazaar"	Anuradha Paudwal, Abhijeet
9.	"Jab Jab Pyar Pe Pehra Hua Hai" (Female)	Anuradha Paudwal
10.	"Rehne Ko Ghar Nahin"	Kumar Sanu, Debashish Dasgupta, Junaid Akhtar
11.	"Kya Sochta Hai Ae Dil"	Anuradha Paudwal
12.	"Tumhein Apna Banane Ki" (Male)	Kumar Sanu

== Awards ==
- Sadashiv Amrapurkar won the Filmfare Award for Best Performance in a Negative Role.

== Sequel ==
A sequel, Sadak 2, was planned in September 2018. The principal photography of the film began on 18 May 2019, & was released on 28 August 2020 on Disney+ Hotstar. The sequel starring Alia Bhatt and Aditya Roy Kapur alongside Sanjay Dutt and Pooja Bhatt reprising their original roles is directed by Mahesh Bhatt. The film is produced by Mukesh Bhatt and is presented by Mahesh Bhatt and Vishesh Films. The script was penned by Shagufta Rafique and Robin Bhatt.
