= Sanam Teri Kasam (2009 film) =

2000 film by Lawrence D'Souza

Sanam Teri Kasam (2009)
- Directed by: Lawrence D'Souza
- Written by: Talat Rekhi
- Produced by: Sudhakar Bokade
- Starring: Saif Ali Khan; Pooja Bhatt; Atul Agnihotri; Sheeba Akashdeep
- Music by: Nadeem-Shravan
- Distributed by: Ultra Music
- Release date: 5 June 2009
- Running time: 170 minutes
- Country: India
- Language: Hindi

Sanam Teri Kasam (transl. Promise on your beloved) is a 2009 Indian romantic drama film directed by Lawrence D'Souza and starring Saif Ali Khan, Pooja Bhatt, Atul Agnihotri and Sheeba Akashdeep. The film was released in 2009, although it was produced in 1994. A long legal battle delayed its release for the fifteen years, from 1994 to 2009. The film was previously titled Sambandh (Relationship) and Yeh Pyar Hi To Hai (Well, that's love). The audio cassettes were released as Sambandh.

== Plot ==
After cheating many women, Vijay, a playboy, finally falls in love with Seema. However, the situation gets bizarre when Seema is tricked into marrying none other than Vijay's best friend, Gopal.

== Cast ==
- Saif Ali Khan as Vijay Verma
- Atul Agnihotri as Gopal
- Pooja Bhatt as Seema Khanna
- Sheeba Akashdeep as Dr. Renu Mahinder Nath
- Vikas Anand as Ramdin Kaka
- Saeed Jaffrey as Vikram Verma
- Alok Nath as Khanna

== Soundtrack ==
The music of the film was composed by Nadeem-Shravan and the lyrics were written by Sameer.

#	Title	Singer(s)
1	"Itna Bhi Na Chaho Mujhe"	Kumar Sanu, Alka Yagnik
2	"Sanam Yeh Pyaar Hi To Hai"	Kumar Sanu, Sunanda
3	"Main Dil Ki Dil Mein"	Kumar Sanu, Pankaj Udhas
4	"Ek Baar Ek Baar Pyaar Se"	Kumar Sanu, Poornima
5	"Tum Gwahi Do"	Kumar Sanu
6	"Yeh Dil Darr Raha Hai"	Sapna Mukherjee
7	"Main Pyar Tumse"	Kumar Sanu, Alka Yagnik
