= Avtar Gill =

Indian film actor (born 1950)

Avtar Singh Gill
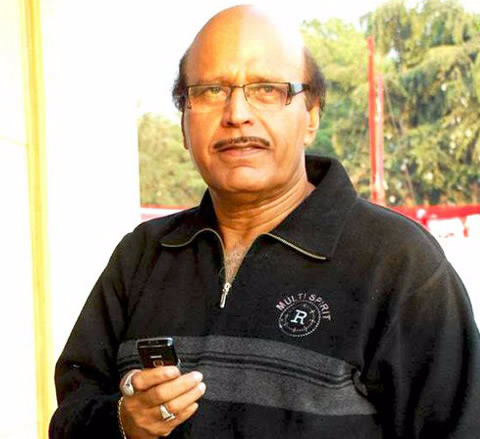
- Gill in 2010
- Born: 14 May 1950 (age 76); Ludhiana, Punjab, India
- Occupation: Actor
- Years active: 1978–present

Avtar Singh Gill (born 14 May 1950) is an Indian actor who appears predominantly in Hindi and Punjabi language 13 films and television serials. He has done many plays with Indian People's Theatre Association Mumbai.

== Selected filmography ==
=== Films ===
Year	Title	Role	Notes
1979	Noorie	Basheer's friend	
1980	Albert Pinto Ko Gussa Kyoon Aata Hai		
1980	Dhan Daulat	Matchbox Factory Worker	
1982	Saath Saath	Avtar	
1982	Ashanti	Raghu	
1982	Sawaal	Lal Singh	
1983	Ek Jaan Hain Hum	John D'Cruz	
1984	Mashaal	Mohan	
1985	Zamana	Police Inspector	
1985	Ghulami	Shaamu	
1986	Khamosh	Dilawar Khan	
1986	Avinash	CID Inspector	
1987	Thikana	Rane, MP	
1988	Khoon Bahaa Ganga Mein		
1988	Shahenshah	Police Commissioner	
1988	Waaris	Daara Singh	
1988	Zakhmi Aurat	Pinky's Rapist	
1988	Kabzaa	Police Inspector	
1989	Daddy	Mr. Seth	
1989	Ilaaka	Becharam, M.L.A.	
1989	Main Azaad Hoon	IG Nagu	
1990	Awaargi	Ranubhai	
1990	Agneepath	Usman	
1990	Aashiqui	Police Inspector Deshpande	
1990	Baaghi		
1991	Nachnewale Gaanewale		
1991	Fateh		
1991	Jaan Ki Kasam		
1991	Karz Chukana Hai		
1991	Dil Hai Ke Manta Nahin		
1991	Saathi		
1991	Pyaar Ka Saaya		
1991	Sadak		
1991	Lakshmanrekha		
1992	Saatwan Aasman		
1992	Adharm		
1992	Nishchaiy		
1992	Jeena Marna Tere Sang		
1992	Balwaan		
1992	Dil Hi To Hai		
1992	Jaanam		
1993	Insaniyat Ke Devta		
1993	Aaj Kie Aurat		
1993	Sangram		
1993	Phir Teri Kahani Yaad Aayee		
1993	Sir		
1993	Chor Aur Chaand		
1993	Pehla Nasha		
1993	Jeevan Ki Shatranj		
1993	Gumrah		
1993	Pehchaan		
1993	Tadipaar		
1994	Dulaara		
1994	Dilwale	Natwar	
1994	Imtihaan		
1994	Jai Kishen		
1994	Mohra		
1994	Madam X	Rana Deshpanday	Cameo Appearance
1994	Aag		
1994	Kranti Kshetra		
1994	Hum Hain Bemisaal		
1995	Baazi		
1995	God and Gun		
1995	Anokha Andaaz	Narayan Patel	
1995	Sauda	Khanna, the builder	
1995	Sabse Bada Khiladi		
1995	Milan		
1995	Rangeela		
1995	Veergati (1995)		
1996	Bal Brahmachari		
1996	Ek Tha Raja		
1996	Vishwasghaat		
1996	Nirbhay	Advocate Dubey	
1996	Chaahat		
1996	Bhishma		
1996	Mr. Bechara		
1996	Sapoot	School Master Vidyasagar	
1996	Chhote Sarkar		
1996	Ram Aur Shyam		
1997	Lahu Ke Do Rang	Lawyer Hasu Bhai	
1997	Mrityudand		
1997	Gudia		
1997	Aur Pyaar Ho Gaya		
1997	Deewana Mastana		
1998	Phool Bane Patthar		
1998	Chandaal		
1998	Ustadon Ke Ustad		
1998	Keemat – They Are Back		
1998	Major Saab		
1998	Bade Miyan Chote Miyan		
1998	Pardesi Babu		
1998	Zakhm		
1999	International Khiladi		
1999	Safari	Police Inspector Avatar Singh	
1999	Baadshah	Seth Jhunjhunwala	
1999	Dil Kya Kare		
1999	Yeh Hai Mumbai Meri Jaan		
2000	Hadh Kar Di Aapne	Mr Bakiyani	
2000	Beti No.1		
2000	Jungle		
2001	Jodi No.1		
2001	Ek Rishtaa: The Bond of Love		
2001	Indian		
2001	Deewaanapan		
2002	Maa Tujhhe Salaam		
2002	Hum Kisise Kum Nahin	Inspector Shinde	
2002	Encounter: The Killing		
2002	Gunaah		
2003	Hawa		
2003	Tada		
2003	Baghban	Mr. Rawat; ICICI Bank Manager	
2003	Inteha		
2003	LOC Kargil		
2004	Yeh Lamhe Judaai Ke	Kamlesh Dhingra	
2004	Lakeer – Forbidden Lines		
2004	Bhola in Bollywood		
2005	Elaan	Farid Chacha	
2005	Ssukh		
2006	Tom, Dick, and Harry	Celina's Uncle	
2006	Alag		
2006	The Killer		
2006	Sarhad Paar		
2007	Nehlle Pe Dehlla		
2007	Fear		
2007	Big Brother	Lawyer Nathani	
2009	Dhoondte Reh Jaaoge		
2010	Asa Mi Tasa Mi	Satish Sarpotdar	Marathi film
2010	Tees Maar Khan		
2012	Mere Dost Picture Abhi Baki Hai		
2012	Pinky Moge Wali		
2013	Singh vs Kaur		
2013	Luv U Soniyo		
2016	Wazir		
2016	Airlift		
2017	Toofan Singh		
2017	Dhingana	Mohan Shetty	Marathi film
2019	Dulla Vaily	Thanedaar Choudhary	
2019	Solar Eclipse: Depth of Darkness	Sardar Patel	
2019	Rabb Da Radio 2	Maama Preetam Singh	
2020	Kaamyaab		
2023	1920: Horrors of the Heart		
TBA	Gabru Gang	Mahendra Pratap Singh	
TBA	Yaar Jugaari		
2024	The U P Files		

=== Television ===
Year	Show	Role	Notes
1984	Yeh Jo Hai Zindagi	Various Roles	
1986–1987	Nukkad	Kader Bhai	
1992–1993	Ye Duniya Gazab Ki		
1993–1995	Tara		
1993–1994	Naya Nukkad	Kadar Bhai	
1995	Rahat	Chopda	
1996	Papa		
2000	Gharwali Uparwali	Pooja's Uncle	
2003–2004	Detective Karan		
–	Saat Vachan Saat Phere		
2010	Adaalat	Judge Brijnath Goyal	
2012–2013	Hum Ne Li Hai- Shapath		
2016	Ek Duje Ke Vaaste		
2019	Yeh Hai Aashiqui		Episodic role
2020	Ayodhya Ki Ramleela	Janaka	Live Show of Ramleela
2019	Choti Sarrdaarni	Avtaar Singh Kohli	Supporting role
2021	Kyun Utthe Dil Chhod Aaye	Lala Ratan Kishore Sahani	Protagonist (Amrit's) father
