= Tamanna (1997 film) =

- Poster
- Directed by: Mahesh Bhatt
- Written by: Mahesh Bhatt; Tanuja Chandra
- Produced by: Pooja Bhatt
- Starring: Paresh Rawal; Pooja Bhatt; Sharad Kapoor; Manoj Bajpayee
- Cinematography: Bhushan Patel
- Edited by: Sanjay Sankla
- Music by: Anu Malik
- Production company: Pooja Bhatt Productions
- Distributed by: Spark Films
- Release date: 7 March 1997
- Running time: 127 minutes
- Country: India
- Language: Hindi

Tamanna (transl. Desire) is a 1997 Indian Hindi-language drama film directed by Mahesh Bhatt. It stars Paresh Rawal, Pooja Bhatt, Sharad Kapoor and Manoj Bajpayee. The screenplay was written by Tanuja Chandra. The story was written by Tanuja Chandra and Mahesh Bhatt. It was produced by Pooja Bhatt.

== Plot ==
The year is 1975, the place is Mahim, Bombay. This is the story of Tikku, a Hijra and the only child of yesteryear Bollywood actress Nazneen Begum. Begum has fallen upon hard times, is virtually destitute, and is dependent on Tikku, who does make-up/hair-dressing of Bollywood actresses. When she passes away, Tikku is beside herself with grief. After the funeral, she witnesses a woman leaving a child in a garbage bin. Tikku picks up the girl, longing for human company, decides to keep her, names her Tamanna, and brings her up on her own with the help of a close friend, Saleem.

When she is old enough, Tikku arranges for her education in St. Mary's High School's hostel. When she completes school, she returns home to find Tikku in the guise of a hijra and shuns her, but subsequently relents. Then Tikku finds out that Tamanna is the daughter of Ranvir Chopra, an up-and-coming politician. She tells her, and she goes to their palatial house. What follows is the impact this visit has on the Chopra family and the excuse they have for abandoning Tamanna. Ranvir considered a daughter as a burden and favoured sons over them. When Tamanna records his confession, he tries to kill her but Tikku saves Tamanna. Ranvir is arrested for his crimes. When Tamanna's mother and brother request her to return to them, she declines and prefers to stay with Tikku.

== Cast ==
- Paresh Rawal as Tikku Ali Sayyed
- Pooja Bhatt as Tamanna Ali Sayyed
  - Alia Bhatt as a young Tamanna
- Sharad Kapoor as Sajid Khan
  - Kunal Khemu as young Sajid
- Manoj Bajpayee as Saleem Khan
- Kamal Chopra as Ranvir Chopra, Tamanna's biological father
- Abha Ranjan as Geeta Chopra, Tamanna's biological mother
- Ashutosh Rana as a contract killer
- Akshay Anand as Jugal Chopra, Tamanna's brother
- Nadira as Nazneen Begum, Tikku's mother
- Zohra Sehgal as Ranveer Chopra's mother
- Sulabha Deshpande as Kaushalya, servant of the Chopra family
- Anupam Shyam as Anjum, Tikku's step-brother
- Rita Bhaduri as Mother Superior (cameo)
- Kunickaa Sadanand as a movie actress, Tikku's client (cameo)
- Shaheen Bhatt as Ashutosh Rana's character's daughter

== Accolades ==
The film won the National Film Award for Best Film on Other Social Issues in 1998.

== Soundtrack ==
The music is composed by Anu Malik with lyrics by Rahat Indori, Nida Fazli, Indeevar and Kaifi Azmi. Kumar Sanu, Sonu Nigam and Alka Yagnik were selected to sing the tracks. "Yeh Kya Hua" & "Ye Aaine Jo Tumhe" became a very popular songs in 1997.

#	Song	Singer(s)	Lyrics
1.	"Yeh Kya Hua"	Kumar Sanu, Alka Yagnik	Rahat Indori
2.	"Shabke Jage Huye"	Kumar Sanu	Nida Fazli
3.	"Uth Meri Jaan"	Sonu Nigam	Kaifi Azmi
4.	"Ye Aaine Jo Tumhe"	Kumar Sanu	Indeevar
5.	"Shabke Jage Huye"	Alka Yagnik	Makhdoom Mohiuddin
6.	"Ghar Se Masjid"	Sonu Nigam	Nida Fazli
7.	"Aaj Kal Meri"	Alka Yagnik	Rahat Indori
