= Daddy (1989 film) =

- Written by: Suraj Sanim
- Directed by: Mahesh Bhatt
- Starring: Anupam Kher; Pooja Bhatt; Manohar Singh; Raj Zutshi
- Music by: Rajesh Roshan
- Country of origin: India
- Original language: Hindi

Production
- Producer: Mukesh Bhatt

Original release
- Release: 8 February 1989

Daddy is a 1989 television film made for Doordarshan. Directed by Mahesh Bhatt, this film marked the acting debut of his eldest daughter Pooja Bhatt. The film boasts spectacular performances by its lead actors Anupam Kher and Manohar Singh. It features a famous ghazal Aaina Mujhse Meri Pehli Si Surat Maange sung by Talat Aziz.

== Cast ==
- Anupam Kher as Anand Sarin
- Manohar Singh as Kantaprasad
- Pooja Bhatt as Pooja Sarin
- Soni Razdan as Priya Sarin, Anand's 2nd wife
- Sulbha Arya as Tarabai
- Neena Gupta as Vimla Sarin, Anand's 1st wife
- Avtar Gill as Mr. Seth
- Suhas Joshi as Mrs. Kantaprasad
- Raj Zutshi as Nikhil Sen
- Pramod Moutho as Oscar
- Satish Kaushik as Pushkar Nath
- Akash Khurana as Siddharth Shukla

== Music ==
The music was composed by Rajesh Roshan and the lyrics were by Suraj Sanim.

Song	Singer	Raga
Ghar ke ujiyare so jaa re	Talat Aziz	Tilak Kamod
Aayina Mujhse Meree Pahelee See Surat Mange	Talat Aziz	
Mai Adhura Sa Ek Geet Hu	Talat Aziz	
Dabdabai Aankhein	Arun Ingle	
Wafa Jo Tumse Kabhee Maine Nibhaee Hotee	Talat Aziz	

== Production ==
Mahesh Bhatt changed the climax of the film just a day before it was shot. Bhatt himself was struggling with alcoholism while shooting this well-received film.

A theatrical adaptation of Daddy, directed by Dinesh Gautam, was first staged in 2015 with Imran Zahid in the lead role. It was a rare Indian production staged at an international theatre festival in Pakistan in 2015, although the staging was delayed because of visa hassles.

== Awards ==
- 1990 – Filmfare Critics Award for Best Performance: Anupam Kher
- 1990 – Filmfare Best Dialogue Award: Surah Sanim
- 1990 – Filmfare Award for Lux New Face of the Year: Pooja Bhatt
- 1989 – National Film Award – Special Jury Award: Anupam Kher.
