= Zakhm =

1998 Indian film by Mahesh Bhatt

- Movie poster for Zakhm
- Directed by: Mahesh Bhatt
- Screenplay by: Tanuja Chandra; Mahesh Bhatt
- Dialogues by: Girish Dhamija
- Story by: Mahesh Bhatt
- Produced by: Mukesh Bhatt; Pooja Bhatt
- Starring: Ajay Devgn; Nagarjuna; Pooja Bhatt; Sonali Bendre; Kunal Khemu; Ashutosh Rana; Akshay Anand
- Cinematography: Nirmal Jani
- Edited by: Sanjay Sankla
- Music by: M. M. Kreem
- Production company: Pooja Bhatt Productions
- Release date: 25 December 1998
- Running time: 124 minutes
- Country: India
- Language: Hindi

Zakhm (transl. Wound) is a 1998 Indian Hindi-language drama film written and directed by Mahesh Bhatt and produced by Mahesh and Pooja Bhatt. The film stars Ajay Devgn, Kunal Khemu, Pooja Bhatt, Sonali Bendre and Nagarjuna. Zakhm was based on the life of Mahesh Bhatt's mother Shirin Mohammad Ali, while his daughter Pooja essayed her character in this film.

Zakhm was awarded with the Nargis Dutt Award for Best Feature Film on National Integration. Devgn's performance won him his first National Film Award for Best Actor.

== Plot ==
Music director Ajay argues with his wife, Sonia. Sonia wants to give birth to their child in England whereas Ajay wants his child to be born in India and does not want to go to England (because of the insecurity caused by the Mumbai riots).

Ajay soon learns that his mother has been burned by a group of Muslim rioters while leaving a temple and is in a critical condition. In a flashback, the struggles that his mother had to undergo to raise her children are shown. She was in love with a Hindu film producer turned director Raman Desai but was not allowed to marry him on account of her Muslim faith. He marries her but does not document or acknowledge their marriage as it was done without any traditional rituals. As she had children with a Hindu man, she lives her married life as a Hindu, even in front of her son.

After his father's sudden death caused by an accident on the day Ajay's younger brother is born, Ajay realises his mother is a Muslim. She makes him promise to bury her according to her faith when she dies, for it is only through a proper burial that she will be able to find herself reunited with her beloved in heaven. She also takes a promise from Ajay that he will never tell his brother about her real identity. Ajay's mother succumbs to the burns. Sonia learns about her mother-in-law's past and decides not to leave Ajay. She stands by him and supports his decision to bury his mother. However, Ajay's task is impeded by a fundamentalist leader Subodh bhai, who wanted to make this a political issue and encouraged the Hindu youth to kill Muslims.

Anand happens to be a youth leader and Ajay's younger brother. When Anand learns of Subodhbhai's intentions, he stands by his brother's decision to bury their mother according to Islamic customs. Her body is buried as she had desired, and she reunites with Raman in heaven. At last, Ajay is seen releasing his mother's Mangalsutra in the sea, indicating the end of her life of struggle and signalling union with her husband.

== Cast ==
- Ajay Devgn as Ajay Desai
  - Kunal Khemu as young Ajay
- Nagarjuna as Raman Desai, Ajay and Anand's father
- Sonali Bendre as Sonia Maheshwari Desai, Ajay's wife
- Pooja Bhatt as Noor Hussain Khan, Ajay and Anand's mother
- Ashutosh Rana as Subodh Malgaonkar
- Sharat Saxena as Inspector Pawar
- Akshay Anand as Anand Kumar Desai, Ajay's brother
- Avtar Gill as Isa
- Zafar Karachiwala
- Saurabh Shukla as Gurdayal Singh
- Madan Jain as Journalist Anwar Hashmi
- Vishwajeet Pradhan as Senior Inspector Vishwajeet Yadav

== Soundtrack ==
Zakhm

Soundtrack album by M. M. Keeravani
- Released: September 1998
- Genre: Soundtrack
- Length: 34:40
- Label: His Master's Voice

M. M. Keeravani chronology
Pandaga (1998)	Zakhm (1998)	Pelli Kanuka (1998)

The music was composed by M. M. Keeravani with lyrics by Anand Bakshi. The soundtrack was released by the His Master's Voice label. The composer selected Chitra for " Gali Main Aaj Chand Nikala " but for unknown reasons the song was later sung by Alka Yagnik.

No.	Title	Singer(s)	Length
1.	"Gali Mein Aaj Chaand Nikla"	Alka Yagnik	5:07
2.	"Hum Yahan Tum Yahan (Male)"	Kumar Sanu	4:52
3.	"Maa Ne Kaha (Male)"	M. M. Keeravani	2:48
4.	"Padh Likh Ke"	Alka Yagnik	4:35
5.	"Hum Yahan Tum Yahan (Female)"	Alka Yagnik	4:52
6.	"Maa Ne Kaha (Female)"	Chitra	2:47
7.	"Raat Sari Bekaraari Mein"	Alka Yagnik	5:04
8.	"Maa Ne Kaha (Sad)"	M. M. Kreem	1:29
9.	"Gali Mein Aaj Chaand Nikla (Sad)"	Alka Yagnik	3:06
Total length:			34:40

== Reception ==
Mukhtar Anjoom of Deccan Herald wrote that "Mahesh Bhatt foolishly swerves and rams the brakes while cruising along a solid theme. By making it personalized, he fails to tackle the wider ramifications of divisive politics and fritters away the opportunity to make a masterpiece of his swansong".

== Awards ==
National Film Awards

- Won: 1998 National Film Award for Best Actor – Ajay Devgn

Screen Awards

- Won: 1999 Screen Award for Best Actor – Ajay Devgn

Filmfare Awards

- Won: 1999 Outstanding Film of the Year – Mahesh Bhatt

== TV series ==
The story has been adapted into a TV series, named Naamkarann, which aired on STAR Plus from September 2016 to June 2018.
