= Shatranj (1993 film) =

- शतरंज
- Directed by: Aziz Sejawal
- Written by: Kader Khan (Dialogues)
- Screenplay by: Sanjeev Duggal; Yunus Sejawal
- Story by: Sanjeev Duggal
- Produced by: Arun S Thakur
- Starring: Mithun Chakraborty; Jackie Shroff; Juhi Chawla; Divya Bharti; Kader Khan
- Cinematography: S. Pappu
- Edited by: Gurudutt Shirali; Waman Bhonsle
- Music by: Anand–Milind; Sameer Anjaan (lyrics)
- Production company: Abhishek films
- Release date: 17 December 1993
- Running time: 140 minutes
- Country: India
- Language: Hindi

Shatranj (transl. Chess) is a 1993 Indian Hindi-language drama film directed by Aziz Sejawal, starring Mithun Chakraborty, Jackie Shroff, Juhi Chawla and Divya Bharti. The movie marks Divya Bharti's last film appearance.

== Plot ==
Shatranj is the story of three brothers Dharamraj (Kader Khan), Dinky (Mithun Chakraborty) and Dino (Jackie Shroff). Dharamraj runs a garage with his two younger brothers and has remained a bachelor all his life as he hates women. He also forbids his brothers from falling in love and getting married. Tension between the brothers arises when Dinky and Dino meet and fall in love with Radha (Juhi Chawla) and Renu (Divya Bharti). After Dharamraj stops them from marrying Renu and Radha, the brothers leave home. They soon discover the real reason Dharamraj hates women. They are actually the real heirs of a wealthy business empire that was run by their father (Vikas Anand) before his death. Their father had remarried after their mother's death and their stepmother (Usha Nadkarni) ill-treated them. They also have a stepbrother Robin (Shakti Kapoor). This was the reason why Dharamraj left home and took his two brothers with him. He vowed to never marry as he feared his wife would also ill-treat his brothers. Dino and Dinky return home to their brother and he slowly starts to approve of Renu and Radha. Meanwhile, their stepmother has left her business in the hands of the corrupt Prajpati (Kiran Kumar), who is also the actual killer of their father. The brothers soon unite with Robin to save their stepmother when Prajpanti plans to steal their wealth and frame them for his crimes.

== Cast ==
- Mithun Chakraborty as Dinky Verma
- Jackie Shroff as Dino Verma
- Juhi Chawla as Radha
- Divya Bharti as Renu
- Shakti Kapoor as Robin
- Kader Khan as Dharamraj Verma
- Usha Nadkarni as Mrs. Verma
- Guddi Maruti as Ganga
- Kiran Kumar as Prajpati
- Raju Shrestha as Dinky's Friend
- Jamuna as Rosy as Dharamraj's love interest
- Vikas Anand as Mr. Verma
- Sarfaraz Khan as Younger Dharamraj
- Dinesh Hingoo as Ojha Mama
- Gavin Packard as Kevin
- Arun Bakshi as Arun
- Lilliput as Garage Mechanic
- Ekta Sohini as Robin's Date
- Sahila Chadha

== Soundtrack ==
The lyrics of all songs were written by Sameer Anjaan and the music was composed by Anand-Milind.

Song	Singer
"Ek Se Bane Do, Do Se Bane Teen"	S. P. Balasubrahmanyam, Abhijeet, Udit Narayan
"Maine Na Jana Yeh Tune Na Jana"	S. P. Balasubrahmanyam, Jayshree Shivram
"Ae Sanam Itna Bata, Hai Kasam"	S. P. Balasubrahmanyam, Sadhana Sargam
"Dil Pe Tere Pyar"	Kumar Sanu, Sadhana Sargam
"Koi Nahin"	Kumar Sanu, Jolly Mukherjee
"Parody"	Sudesh Bhosle, Poornima

== Divya Bharti's death ==
This was the last film of Divya Bharti, who fell from her fifth-floor apartment and died in April 1993, eight months before the film's release in December. Although she had completed filming her scenes before her death, a dubbing artist was used to dub her voice.
