= Tum Mile =

2009 Indian film by Kunal Deshmukh

- Theatrical release poster
- Directed by: Kunal Deshmukh
- Written by: Ankur Tewari
- Produced by: Mukesh Bhatt
- Starring: Emraan Hashmi; Soha Ali Khan
- Cinematography: Prakash Kutty
- Edited by: Ajay Sharma
- Music by: Songs: Pritam; Background Score: Raju Singh
- Production company: Vishesh Films
- Distributed by: PVR Pictures
- Release date: 13 November 2009
- Running time: 140 minutes
- Country: India
- Language: Hindi
- Budget: ₹220 million
- Box office: ₹134 million

Tum Mile (transl. I Got You) is a 2009 Indian Hindi-language romantic drama film directed by Kunal Deshmukh, with a story by Vishesh Bhatt. The film stars Emraan Hashmi and Soha Ali Khan. It is a love story set against the backdrop of the July 2005 Mumbai floods. The film was released on 13 November 2009.

== Plot ==
Akshay Malvade, an artist and character designer, boards a flight departing from Kottayam, Kerala. On board, he notices Sanjana Singhania seated across from him beside a businessman. Seeing each other prompts both of them to reminisce about their past relationship.

Several years earlier, Akshay is a struggling artist living in Cape Town. He first meets Sanjana while painting outdoors during the launch of one of her promotional campaigns, which is interrupted by heavy rain. Later, Sanjana accidentally damages Akshay's motorcycle while parking her car and leaves him a note. Akshay and his friend Vicky visit her residence, where Akshay helps repair a birthday cake she is preparing for her father. In return, Sanjana arranges for Akshay's motorcycle to be repaired and drives the two friends home. During the journey, they develop a friendship.

Encouraged by Vicky, Akshay contacts Sanjana, who invites him to an art exhibition to help him network with potential clients. The two spend more time together, eventually falling in love and sharing their first kiss. However, when Akshay accompanies Sanjana home, he discovers that she is engaged. Embarrassed, he leaves.

The following day, Sanjana's fiancé asks whether she is happy with their arranged engagement. She admits that she has fallen in love with Akshay. Her fiancé accepts her decision, and Sanjana ends the engagement before confessing her feelings to Akshay. The couple begin a relationship and eventually move in together.

Although talented, Akshay struggles to establish himself professionally and frequently faces financial difficulties, leading to tensions in the relationship. Sanjana continues working while supporting him. When Akshay receives a job opportunity in Sydney, Australia, he wants to accept it, but Sanjana is unable to leave her career behind. Their disagreement escalates into an argument, and they separate.

Back in the present, their flight coincides with the catastrophic flooding in Mumbai during the 2005 Maharashtra floods. Stranded amid the disaster, Akshay and Sanjana struggle to survive alongside Vicky. During their escape, Vicky is electrocuted after falling into floodwater carrying a live electrical cable. Spending time together during the crisis leads Akshay and Sanjana to reflect on their past, and they realize that their separation was temporary rather than permanent. They reconcile, believing they are destined to be together.

During the closing credits, Akshay and Sanjana are shown happily reunited. Sanjana is pregnant, and the couple are later seen raising their young son together.

== Cast ==
- Emraan Hashmi as Akshay "Akki" Malvade
- Soha Ali Khan as Sanjana Singhania
- Sachin Khedekar as Mr. Arun Singhania
- Rituraj Singh as Mr. Vishal Khanna
- Gavin Packard as businessman Joe (voice dubbed by Aziz Naser)
- J. Brandon Hill as Anthony
- Atul Gogavale as an electrician in Cape Town

== Soundtrack ==
Tum Mile

Soundtrack album by Pritam
- Released: 7 September 2009
- Genre: Feature film soundtrack
- Length: 45:52
- Label: Sony Music India
- Producer: Vishesh Films

Pritam chronology
| Ajab Prem Ki Ghazab Kahani (2009) | Tum Mile (2009) | De Dana Dan (2009) |

The soundtrack was released on 7 September. The songs were composed by Pritam with lyrics by Sayeed Quadri and Kumaar.

The film score was composed by Raju Singh.

=== Track list ===
| Track # | Song | Artist(s) | Lyricist(s) | Duration |
|---|---|---|---|---|
| 1 | "Tum Mile" | Neeraj Shridhar | Kumaar | 05:43 |
| 2 | "Dil Ibadat" | KK | Kumaar, Sayeed Quadri | 05:29 |
| 3 | "Tu Hi Haqeeqat" | Javed Ali | Kumaar, Sayeed Quadri | 05:02 |
| 4 | "Iss Jahan Main" | Mohit Chauhan | Kumaar, Sayeed Quadri | 04:44 |
| 5 | "Tum Mile (Reprise)" | Javed Ali,:Kunal Ganjawala, Ash King & Suraj Jagan (Chorus) | Kumaar | 05:03 |
| 6 | "O Meri Jaan" | KK | Sayeed Quadri | 04:57 |
| 7 | "Dil Ibadat (Qawwali)" | Krishnakumar Kunnath, Sabri Brothers | Sayeed Quadri | 05:26 |
| 8 | "Tum Mile (Hindustani Classical)" | Shafqat Amanat Ali, Pandit Jasraj (Alaap) | Kumaar | 05:40 |
| 9 | "Soul of Tum Mile" | Instrumental | | 03:45 |

== Reception ==
Professional ratings
Review scores
| Source | Rating |
|---|---|
| Bollywood Hungama | 4/5 stars |
| Glamsham | 4/5 stars |
| Glamsham | 3/5 stars |

Tum Mile opened to mixed to positive reviews, with most major critics agreeing it to be a passable movie. Taran Adarsh of Bollywood Hungama gave it a rating of 3/5 and said, "Tum Mile caters to the youth mainly. At the box-office, the Vishesh Films - Emraan Hashmi combo has cultivated a strong fan-base over the years and coupled with good music, which is also very popular, the film should find itself in the comfortable zone". A critic from The Times of India wrote that "Go, get a taste of substantial Bollywood with Tum Mile: a story well told". A critic from Hindustan Times wrote that "You realise, while the romance and its conflicts are short-lived, this is not a disaster film at all. I mean this as much for its genre as hopefully its fate among the public". A critic from Rediff.com wrote that "Ultimately, though, Tum Mile's true strength lies in the combined appeal and compelling performances of Emraan and Soha. Awe-inspiring it is not but engaging? By all means". A critic from Mid-Day wrote that "More miserable than doomsday, TM fails to capture the pathos of the ordinary Mumbaikar or even weave an original love story that could rise above clichés". A critic from Bangalore Mirror wrote that "The problem in Tum Mile is that the screenplay is too well plotted, almost like a set-up, while the lead pair lack any magic. The dialogues are very wordy and the entire tone of the film is a bit plodding. A critic from The Economic Times wrote that "Tum Mile might be dilute on the deluge but concentrates on having its heart in the right place. Watch it as a disaster flick and you will find it disastrous. Watch it as a love story and you will love it".

== Box office ==
According to Box Office India, Tum Mile was a flop, grossing only ₹13.46 crores on a budget of ₹22 crore, just short of its budget.
