= Guru Dakshina =

Guru Dakshina may refer to:

- Gurudakshina, an offering or honorarium to a guru or teacher in Hinduism
- Guru Dakshina (1983 film), a 1983 Indian Malayalam-language film
- Guru Dakshina (1987 film), a 1987 Indian Bengali-language film
- Ek Adbhut Dakshina Guru Dakshina, a 2015 Indian Hindi-language film
