= Murder (film series) =

Indian film series

Murder Franchise
- Created by: Mahesh Bhatt and Mukesh Bhatt
- Original work: Murder
- Owner: Vishesh Films

Films and television
- Film(s): Murder (2004); Murder 2 (2011); Murder 3 (2013); Murder 4 (2026)

Murder is a series of Indian thriller films produced by Mahesh Bhatt and Mukesh Bhatt under the banner of Vishesh Films. The first instalment directed by Anurag Basu was released on 2 April 2004; the second instalment by Mohit Suri was released on 8 July 2011; and the third instalment by Vishesh Bhatt was released on 15 February 2013. The fourth instalment, set to be released on 17 July 2026, is currently under production.

== Films ==
Film	Release date	Director	Writer(s)	Based on	Producer(s)
Murder	2 April 2004	Anurag Basu	Anurag Basu	The Unfaithful Wife (1969) by Claude Chabrol	Mukesh Bhatt, Mahesh Bhatt
Murder 2	8 July 2011	Mohit Suri	Shagufta Rafiq	The Chaser (2008) by Na Hong-jin	Mukesh Bhatt, Mahesh Bhatt
Murder 3	15 February 2013	Vishesh Bhatt	Mahesh Bhatt, Amit V Masurkar	The Hidden Face (2011) by Andrés Baiz	Mukesh Bhatt, Mahesh Bhatt
Murder 4	TBA	Vikram Bhatt and Mohit Suri	Shagufta Rafiq	Hum Hain Bemisaal (1994)	Mahesh Bhatt, and Mukesh Bhatt

=== Murder (2004 film) ===
The first instalment of the series is based on the 1969 French film The Unfaithful Wife by Claude Chabrol. Murder was released on 2 April 2004 and, despite receiving mixed reviews from critics, managed to become a highly successful venture at the box office, earning a "super hit" status from Box Office India. The film was a huge breakthrough for its lead actors, particularly Hashmi and Sherawat. It received an A certificate from the Indian Censor Board for its erotic subject and scenes. The film became one of the highest grossing Bollywood films of the year.

=== Murder 2 (2011 film) ===
A sequel, Murder 2, was commissioned after the success of the previous film and is directed by Mohit Suri, with Emraan Hashmi and Jacqueline Fernandez. The film is alleged to be based on the 2008 South Korean film The Chaser, though Bhatt denied this and said that it was inspired from the 2006 Nithari killings in Noida. The film is remembered for its erotic scenes. It was released on 8 July 2011 (worldwide), and received mixed to positive reviews from various critics of India. Proving to be similarly successful to the first entry in the series, the film became another profitable addition to the franchise, having earned ₹115 crore worldwide, from a budget of ₹50 crore.

=== Murder 3 (2013 film) ===
After the success of the previous films, Bhatt hinted that there would be another sequel. The film was titled as M3, but then changed to Murder 3. Film is directed by Vishesh Bhatt and also the third installment in this series. The film stars Randeep Hooda, Aditi Rao Hydari and Sara Loren in lead roles. The film is an official remake of the Colombian thriller The Hidden Face. It was released on 15 February 2013. Murder 3 became an average grosser at the box office and received mixed reviews from critics.

== Future films ==
Film	Release date	Director	Screenwriter	Story by	Producer(s)	Status
Murder 4	TBA	Mohit Suri and Vikram Bhatt	Mukesh Bhatt and Mahesh Bhatt	Ravi Walia	Mahesh Bhatt and Mukesh Bhatt	In- Development

== Recurring cast and characters ==
This table lists the main characters who appear in the Murder franchise.

Characters	Films					
Characters	Murder (2004)	Murder 2 (2011)	Murder 3 (2013)	Murder 4 (2026)		
Emraan Hashmi	Sunny Devaa	Arjun Bhagawat		TBA		
Mallika Sherawat	Simran Sehgal					
Jacqueline Fernandez		Priya				
Randeep Hooda			Vikram			
Aditi Rao Hydari			Roshni			
Sara Loren			Nisha Sengupta			
Ashmit Patel	Sudhir Sehgal					
Esha Gupta					TBA	
Raj Zutshi	Inspector Rajvir Singh					TBA
Sulagna Panigrahi		Reshma		TBA		
Prashant Narayanan		Dheeraj Pandey		TBA		
Aditya Pancholi	Suraj					

== Additional crew and production details ==
Occupation	Film		
Occupation	Murder (2004)	Murder 2 (2011)	Murder 3 (2013)
Director(s)	Anurag Basu	Mohit Suri	Vishesh Bhatt
Producer	Mahesh Bhatt, Mukesh Bhatt	Mahesh Bhatt, Mukesh Bhatt	Mahesh Bhatt, Mukesh Bhatt
Distributing companies	Shemaroo Entertainment, Star India	Wave Cinemas	Fox Star Studios
Music director(s)	Anu Malik	Mithoon	Pritam
Cinematography	Fuwad Khan	Ravi Walia	Sunil Patel
Editor(s)	Akiv Ali	Devendra Murdeshwar	Devendra Murdeshwar
Production companies	Vishesh Films	Vishesh Films	Vishesh Films
Runtime	130 minutes		135 minutes

== Inspirations ==
The first Murder was an uncredited remake of 1969 French film The Unfaithful Wife by Claude Chabrol. Murder 2 was an uncredited remake of South Korean film The Chaser. Murder 3 was an official remake of the Colombian thriller The Hidden Face.

== Release and revenue ==
Film	Release date	Budget	Box office revenue	Ref.
Murder	2 April 2004	₹5 crore	₹22.49 crore	
Murder 2	8 July 2011	₹13 crore	₹67.84 crore	
Murder 3	15 February 2013	₹15 crore	₹27.75 crore	
Total		₹33 crore	₹118.08 crore	

== See also ==
- Raaz (film series)
