= Anurag Basu =

Indian filmmaker (born 1970)

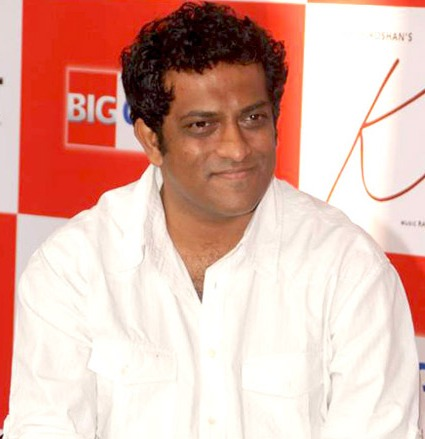
- Basu in 2012
- Born: 8 May 1974 (age 52); Bhilai, Chhattisgarh, India
- Occupations: Director; producer; screenwriter; cinematographer; actor; television presenter
- Years active: 1995–present

Anurag Basu (born 8 May 1970) is an Indian director, screenwriter, cinematographer, producer, and actor in Hindi cinema. After initial setbacks, his breakthrough came with the erotic thriller Murder (2004), and gained prominence with the musical romantic thriller Gangster: A Love Story (2006) and the ensemble urban drama Life in a... Metro (2007), the latter of which earned him the Filmfare Award for Best Screenplay and nomination for the Filmfare Award for Best Director.

His highest grosser came with acclaimed romantic comedy-drama Barfi! (2012), which earned him his second nomination for the Filmfare Award for Best Director. He next directed adventure comedy-drama Jagga Jasoos (2017), which earned mixed reviews and was a box-office bomb, and the Netflix black comedy crime film Ludo (2020), in which he also made his debut as a cinematographer. The latter film also earned him his third nomination for the Filmfare Award for Best Director.

== Early and personal life ==
Basu was born into an upper-middle-class Bengali Hindu family in Bhilai, Madhya Pradesh (now in Chhattisgarh). His parents, Subrato Bose and Deepshikha Bose, were award-winning theatrical artists and Basu grew up watching them performing in his father's theatre company (Abhiyaan). He attended BSP Senior Secondary School, in Bhilai, Chhattisgarh (then Madhya Pradesh). He received a BSc degree in Physics honours from the University of Mumbai, intending to study cinematography at FTII, Pune; however, during his college years in Mumbai he had an opportunity to assist on a number of levels in TV and film projects. After trying to remain involved with filmmaking, Basu became an assistant director to Raman Kumar on Tara.

Basu is married to Tani Basu and has two daughters, Ishana (b. 2004) and Ahana (b. 2007).

== Career ==
=== Television ===
Basu began his television career as an assistant director on Tara in mid 1994. After six months, he was given full responsibility for directing about 712 episodes. He directed television serials, trying genres ranging from daily soaps to thrillers such as Saturday Suspense and Ajeeb Dastaan, and horror (X-Zone). Basu's most successful work during this period was the Balaji Telefilms soap Koshish ...Ek Aashaa in 2000 and he made pilot episodes of Indian television shows including Kyun ki saans bhi kabhi bahu thi, Kahani ghar ghar ki and Kasouti zindagi ki in 2001 and 2002. He began his own company and initially he produced TV serials for Zee TV and Sony channel. The popular shows of his company were Manzilien Apni Apni, Miit, Thriller at Ten, and Horror Shows on Zee. He himself directed the TV series Miit (based on the novel Noukadubi by Rabindranath Tagore), Manzilien Apni Apni and all his other series. Basu has directed many television shows. In 2000 he received a RAPA Award for Best Director Award from the Radio and TV Advertisers Practitioners Association, followed by an Aashirwad Award for Best Director two years later. Basu returned to television in 2007 to produce and direct the college drama Love Story and hosted the Bengali reality show Ke Hobe Biggest Fan (Who Will Be the Biggest Fan) for Zee Bangla in 2010. Basu started his own film production house, Ishana Movies, in 2007 and the first film of his production company was the 2007 musical drama film Life in a... Metro with co-producer UTV. Currently his series Stories by Rabindranath Tagore is airing on Netflix and EPIC Channel. Basu will be judging the upcoming TV show 'Super Dancer Chapter 4', along with Shilpa Shetty and Geeta Kapoor.

=== Films ===
==== Initial work, directorial debut and breakthrough (2003–2004) ====
Basu made his film debut as an extra in the action drama Dalaal (1993). He made his directorial debut with the Balaji Motion Pictures-produced horror slasher film Kucch To Hai (2003), followed by the Vishesh Films-produced supernatural fantasy romantic thriller Saaya (2003). Both films received highly negative reviews from critics upon release, and emerged as commercial disasters at the box-office.

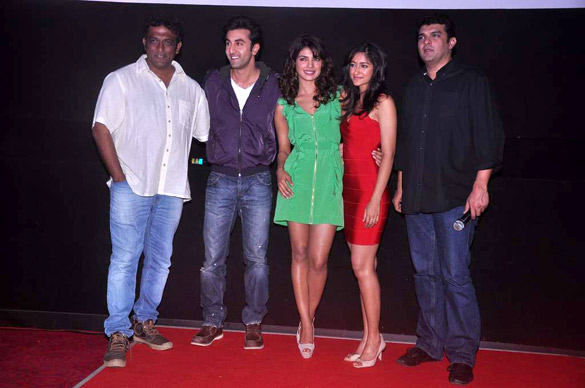
Anurag Basu, Ranbir Kapoor, Priyanka Chopra, Ileana Dcruz and Siddharth Roy Kapur at Barfi! promotion

Basu achieved his breakthrough with the erotic thriller Murder (2004) starring Emraan Hashmi and Mallika Sherawat in lead roles. Based on the American film Unfaithful (2002), It is the first instalment of the Murder film series. The film told the story of an unhappily married woman's extramarital affair with her former flame. Due to its erotic subject and sex scenes, which was unusual for Indian cinema at the time, it received an A certificate from the Central Board of Film Certification. It received mixed reviews from critics upon release, but emerged as a commercial success at the box-office, ranking as the eighth highest-grossing Hindi film of the year.

The same year, he helmed the musical romance Tumsa Nahin Dekha: A Love Story, again starring Hashmi alongside Dia Mirza. Halfway through the film, Basu was diagnosed with acute leukemia. He was immediately hospitalised, directing parts of the film from his hospital bed. He gave instructions by dictaphone for camera angles and script changes, with Mahesh Bhatt and Mohit Suri completing the film while the director underwent chemotherapy. The film received mixed-to-negative reviews from critics upon release, and emerged as a commercial disaster at the box-office.

==== Success (2006–2012) ====
Basu's next directorial venture was the musical romantic thriller Gangster: A Love Story (2006), which starred debutante Kangana Ranaut alongside Hashmi and Shiney Ahuja in lead roles. The film revolves around the complex love triangle between a bar singer, her mysterious lover, and a gangster, exploring themes of love, betrayal, and the criminal underworld. It received positive reviews from critics upon release, with praise for its screenplay, soundtrack, cinematography and performances of the cast. The film emerged as a commercial success at the box-office.

He next screenwrote and directed the ensemble urban drama Life in a... Metro (2007). The film narrates the stories of nine people living in Mumbai and tackles themes such as extramarital affairs, sanctity of marriage, commitment phobia and love. It received widespread critical acclaim upon release, with high praise for its novel concept, story, screenplay, dialogues, soundtrack and performances of the ensemble cast. The film emerged as a surprise commercial success at the box-office. Life in a... Metro won Basu the Filmfare Award for Best Screenplay, in addition to his first nomination for the Filmfare Award for Best Director.

His next film was the romantic action thriller Kites (2010) starring Hrithik Roshan, deutante Bárbara Mori and Kangana Ranaut in lead roles. Filmed in Hindi, English and Spanish, the film follows the tumultuous love story between a dance teacher stuck in a green card marriage, and a woman on the run. It received mixed-to-negative reviews from critics upon release, with sharp criticism for its multilingual narrative that featured the majority of dialogue in English and Spanish. Despite pre-release hype due to its starcast, the film emerged as a below-average grosser at the box-office.

Basu's next directorial and screenwriting venture was the romantic comedy-drama Barfi! (2012) starring Ranbir Kapoor, Priyanka Chopra and Ileana D'Cruz in lead roles. Set in 1970s, the film revolves around the love triangle between a deaf-mute young man, an autistic girl, and a wistful young woman. It opened to widespread critical acclaim, with high praise for its direction, screenplay, cinematography, soundtrack, performances of the cast, and the portrayal of physically disabled people. The film emerged as a major commercial success at the box-office, grossing ₹1.75 billion worldwide, ranking as the sixth highest-grossing Hindi film of the year. Barfi! earned Basu his second nomination for the Filmfare Award for Best Director.

Barfi! was screened at several film festivals such as Busan, Marrakech and Taipei, and won the prestigious Grand Jury Award at the Okinawa International Movie Festival in Japan. The film made the shortlist for India's official entry for the Academy Award for Best International Feature Film at the 85th Academy Awards, but failed to receive a nomination. However, its choice as the country's entry was criticized after Basu was accused of plagiarizing several Hollywood films. Since its release, Barfi! has achieved a cult status for its refreshing story, soundtrack, performances of the cast, and feel-good factor.

==== Later career (2017–present) ====
After a 5-year directorial hiatus, he made his comeback with the musical adventure comedy-drama Jagga Jasoos (2017) starring Kapoor alongside Katrina Kaif. Originally planned for a release in 2014, schedule conflicts set back release. The film was produced by Basu and Kapoor's new production company, Picture Shuru Entertainment, in association with Disney Studios. It tells the story of a teenage detective and an accident-prone journalist who join forces to search for his missing father. The film received mixed reviews upon release, with praise for its innovative storytelling style, cinematography, soundtrack and cast performances, but criticism for its plot, runtime and pacing. Despite hype prior to release, it emerged as a commercial disaster at the box-office.

He next venture was the Netflix black comedy crime film Ludo (2020), in which he also made his debut as a cinematographer. Starring an ensemble cast, the plot of the film interweaves the lives of four characters—a determined young woman, a cunning conman, a troubled teenager, and a righteous police officer—through a series of interconnected stories. It received positive reviews from critics upon release, with praise for its direction, screenplay, cinematography, soundtrack and performances of the cast. The film earned Basu his first nomination for the Filmfare Award for Best Film, and his third nomination for the Filmfare Award for Best Director.

In 2025, his directorial Metro... In Dino, the sequel to Life in a... Metro, starring a new ensemble cast was released to a mixed-to-positive reception with praise for its soundtrack, performances and direction while some criticized its pacing in the second half and some unresolved subplots.

He is next set to direct a musical love story starring Kartik Aaryan opposite Sreeleela. It was conceived as the third installment in the Aashiqui franchise but due to issues in acquiring the title rights and speculated similarities in storylines with Saiyaara (which also has its protagonist as a rockstar), its production is believed to be stuck in limbo.

== Filmography ==
=== Films ===
Year	Title	Director	Writer	Screenplay	Producer
2003	Saaya	Yes	No	No	No
2004	Murder	Yes	Yes	Yes	No
2004	Tumsa Nahin Dekha: A Love Story	Yes	No	No	No
2006	Gangster: A Love Story	Yes	Yes	Yes	No
2007	Life in a... Metro	Yes	Yes	Yes	No
2010	Kites	Yes	No	Yes	No
2012	Barfi!	Yes	Yes	Yes	Yes
2017	Jagga Jasoos	Yes	Yes	Yes	Yes
2020	Ludo	Yes	Yes	Yes	Yes
2025	Metro... In Dino	Yes	Yes	Yes	Yes

==== Frequent collaborations ====
Artists	Saaya (2003)	Murder (2004)	Tumsa Nahi Dekha (2004)	Gangster: A Love Story (2006)	Life in a... Metro (2007)	Kites (2010)	Barfi! (2012)	Jagga Jasoos (2017)	Ludo (2020)	Metro... In Dino (2025)
Aditya Roy Kapur									Yes	Yes
Emraan Hashmi		Yes	Yes	Yes						
Fatima Sana Shaikh									Yes	Yes
Kangana Ranaut				Yes	Yes	Yes				
Kay Kay Menon	Yes			Yes	Yes	Yes				
Konkona Sen Sharma					Yes					Yes
Pankaj Tripathi									Yes	Yes
Pritam				Yes	Yes		Yes	Yes	Yes	Yes
Ranbir Kapoor							Yes	Yes		
Sayeed Quadri	Yes	Yes		Yes	Yes		Yes		Yes	
Shiney Ahuja				Yes	Yes					

=== Television ===
- Tara (1996)
- Saturday Suspense (1998)
- Star Best Sellers (1999)
- X-Zone (1999)
- Ajeeb Dastaan (1998)
- Koshish ...Ek Aashaa (2000)
- Kyunki Saas Bhi Kabhi Bahu Thi (2000)
- Kahaani Ghar Ghar Kii (2000)
- Manzilien Apni Apni (TV series) (2001) – Home production
- Miit (2002) – Home production
- Thriller at 10 (2005–2006) – Home Production
- Ke Hobe Biggest Fan (2010)
- Rooh – Home Production
- Love Story (2007) – Home Production
- Stories by Rabindranath Tagore (2015) – Home Production
- Super Dancer As a Judge (Season 1–4) – (2016–2021)

== Awards and nominations ==
Year	Award	Film	Category	Result
2008	Filmfare Awards	Life in a... Metro	Best Director	Nominated
2008	Filmfare Awards	Life in a... Metro	Best Screenplay	Won
2013	Filmfare Awards	Barfi!	Best Director	Nominated
2021	Filmfare Awards	Ludo	Best Film	Nominated
2021	Filmfare Awards	Ludo	Best Director	Nominated
2021	Filmfare Awards	Ludo	Best Screenplay	Nominated
2021	Filmfare Awards	Ludo	Best Production Design	Nominated
2005	IIFA Awards	Murder	Best Story	Nominated
2007	IIFA Awards	Gangster: A Love Story	Best Screenplay	Nominated
2008	IIFA Awards	Life in a... Metro	Best Director	Nominated
2008	IIFA Awards	Life in a... Metro	Best Story	Nominated
2008	IIFA Awards	Life in a... Metro	Best Screenplay	Won
2013	IIFA Awards	Barfi!	Best Director	Won
2013	IIFA Awards	Barfi!	Best Story	Won
2018	IIFA Awards	Jagga Jasoos	Best Director	Nominated
2008	Producers Guild Film Awards	Life in a... Metro	Best Director	Nominated
2013	Producers Guild Film Awards	Barfi!	Best Story	Nominated
2013	Producers Guild Film Awards	Barfi!	Best Screenplay	Nominated
2008	Screen Awards	Life in a... Metro	Best Director	Nominated
2013	Screen Awards	Barfi!	Best Director	Won
2013	Zee Cine Awards	Barfi!	Best Director	Won
2013	Zee Cine Awards	Barfi!	Best Screenplay	Won
2013	Zee Cine Awards	Barfi!	Power Club – Box Office Award	Won
2013	Times of India Film Awards	Barfi!	Best Director	Won
2013	Bollywood Hungama Surfers' Choice Movie Awards	Barfi!	Best Director	Won
2013	Okinawa International Movie Festival	Barfi!	Grand Jury Award	Won
