= Do Saheliyaan... Kismat Ki Kathputaliyaan =

Indian television series

- Genre: Drama
- Directed by: Jatin Ravasia
- Opening theme: "Do Saheliyaan" by Alka Yagnik
- Country of origin: India
- Original language: Hindi
- No. of seasons: 1
- No. of episodes: 76

Production
- Producer: Ratnaa Sinha
- Production locations: Rajasthan, India
- Camera setup: Multi-camera
- Running time: Approx. 24 minutes
- Production company: Chota Ganpati Telecreations

Original release
- Network: Zee TV
- Release: 1 March – 9 July 2010

Do Saheliyaan... Kismat Ki Kathputaliyaan (English: two friends... puppets of fate) is an Indian television series that aired on Zee TV channel. The series premiered on 1 March 2010 and the final episode aired on 9 July 2010.

== Plot ==
Set in Rajasthan, Do Saheliyaan focuses on the forbidden friendship between the daughter of a wealthy Rajput, Maithili, and a poor Rabari village girl, Bhavri. Although they are best friends, they cannot mingle because of the differences in their castes and economic backgrounds. The story begins with Bhavri and Maithili as young children. Bhavri's uncle Badri elopes with Maithili's paternal aunt Roop. This creates an uproar between the two castes. Maithili runs to rescue her friend, caught in the turmoil. Bhavri's mother Toral sees that Maithili's life is in danger, and runs into the massacre. As Maithili's brother is about to accidentally hit his sister, Toral takes the blow, killing her and separates Badri from Roop. Maithili's grandmother (the head of her household) proclaims that Roop is a disgrace, and tells the latter that Badri is dead; in reality his life is in danger so he flees his village. During Toral's funeral, her younger sister Kalindi appears. She is traumatised by her sister's death and vows revenge on the Rajputs. Kalindi marries Bhavri's father and becomes her niece's stepmother.

The friends grow up and eventually unite Roop and Badri. Because of this, Maithili's grandmother and Bhavri's father wish to get the girls married to suitable men to keep them out of further trouble. Kalindi takes this opportunity to humiliate Maithili and her family. Maithili's wedding has been arranged with an elite Rajput, Shaurya Singh Shekhawat, a military officer. Kalindi goes to Shaurya's border camp, switching Maithili's photograph with Bhavri's in the hope that Shaurya would believe that his future in-laws were trying to deceive him. Shaurya sees Bhavri's picture and falls in love with her. Bhavri's wedding is more difficult to arrange since Maithili's grandmother has spread rumors about her throughout the village. It is the talented and educated Rabari boy, Anadi, who stands up for Bhavri (after watching her from afar) and agrees to marry her. The girls have not seen the men whom they will wed. Maithili and Bhavri's weddings are on the same day. Maithili gifts her friend an identical wedding outfit to her own. They are happy that both will be going to the same honeymoon destination, on the same train, finally free to be friends.

However, fate has something else in store. Their train crashes. Shaurya frantically searches for his wife in the rubble and finds Bhavri (the girl from the photograph) unconscious. He picks her up and takes her away. Maithili runs into Anadi, and they search for their respective spouses in the wreckage. Unsuccessful, Anadi takes Maithili home, since she has nowhere else to go. Bhavri wakes up with the romantic Shaurya and assumes he is her husband Anadi. She does not take her husband's name (since it is considered disrespectful), and Shaurya gives her a nickname; this continues the misunderstanding. Bhavri falls in love with the smitten Shaurya, and they consummate their relationship. When Anadi brings Maithili to his house, his family assumes that she is their daughter-in-law. Anadi's father is injured in an accident. For his sake, Maithili and Anadi continue the charade. Anadi's broken family grows attached to Maithili (especially his mother, Maya, who says that Maithili is the source of good luck for the house). However, Anadi knows he cannot force Maithili to stay in his house, and she again searches for her husband.

Meanwhile, Shaurya has asked Bhavri to go to his estranged family's house; at the train station, she meets Anadi. When Anadi explains that he is her husband, Bhavri puts the pieces together and remembers inconsistencies in her interaction with Shaurya. She realises she has consummated her marriage with the wrong man and feels she has sinned. Heartbroken, she tries to commit suicide; Anadi rescues her. They decide to remedy the situation together. Bhavri goes to Shaurya's house and reconciles him with his parents. She meets resistance when her ignorance of Rajput customs shows, but his family gradually accepts and loves her. Meanwhile, Anadi brings Maithili to Shaurya's home. She is introduced as Bhavri's friend and tries to win her in-laws' support. However, she finds resistance from Bhavri (who confesses that she loves Shaurya and has slept with him). Maithili is heartbroken.

Maithili's parents have discovered the mix-up and the fact that Bhavri is masquerading as their daughter. They confront Shaurya, who invites them to his house to find out what is going on. However, on their way they have an accident; Maithili's parents and Shaurya die. Bhavri and Maithili are grief-stricken: Bhavri by the loss of Shaurya and Maithili by the loss of her parents. Bhavri then discovers she is pregnant; Shaurya's family is comforted that he has left part of himself behind. Maithili now feels unwelcome in Shaurya's home, and wants to return to her parents' house; however, her grandmother makes it clear that she is not welcome there either. Maithili's grandmother blames her (and her friendship with a Rabari) for her parents' death. Left with nowhere to go, Maithili stays with Anadi at his home. Slowly, Anadi and Maithili's friendship turns into love and they get married.

As Anadi and Maithili's relationship blossoms, Bhavri and Kalindi come to their house. Bhavri poses as Maithili's younger sister. Kalindi accuses Maithili of trying to steal Bhavri's husband to avenge herself on the latter; however, Maithili assures her that she is truly in love with Anadi. Maithili and Anadi discover that Shaurya's family members found out Bhavri's true identity and threw her out of their home. Wanting to avoid having her child called a bastard, Bhavri decides to make the world believe that Anadi is the child's father. She drugs and tries to seduce him but without success. She shows doctored photographs of them to Maithili, who stands by her husband, informing Bhavri that she too is pregnant. The friends eventually reconcile. Maithili's baby boy is born prematurely, and it is feared that she may die. However, mother and child survive. Bhavri gives birth to a daughter, saying that she will die soon since the delivery was risky. Maya promises that Maithili's son will marry Bhavri's daughter when the two children grow up. After Bhavri dies, Anadi tells Maithili not to cry; the love of the two friends will continue in their children.

== Cast ==
- Sulagna Panigrahi as Maithili Singh Garewal, the first protagonist of the story, heir of a reputed Rajput family, Pukhraj and Nirjara's only daughter, Vasundhara's granddaughter, Roop's niece, Bhavri's best friend, Shaurya's fiancee and wife, Anadi's second wife
- Raunak Ahuja as Anadi, unorthodox educated Rabari boy, Bhavri's unseen first husband, Maithili's lover turned second husband
- Ankita Srivastava as Bhavri Lodha, the second protagonist and a girl of Rabari clan, Omkar and Toral's biological daughter, Kalindi's stepdaughter, Badri's niece, Maithili's best friend, Anadi's first wife, Shaurya's love interest and the mother of his child
- Gaurav Chaudhary as Lieutenant General Kuwar Shaurya Singh Shekhawat, an elite Rajput serving in Indian army, Maithili's fiancé and first husband, Bhavri's lover and the father of her child (dies in an accident)
- Suhasini Mulay as Vasundhara Devi, the Head Of The Rajputs And Maithli's Grandmother
- Akshay Anand as Pukhraj Singh Garewal, Maithili's father, Vasundhara's son, Roop's elder brother (dies in an accident)
- Payal Nair as Nirjara Singh Garewal, Maithili's mother, Pukhraj's wife, Vasundhara's daughter-in-law (dies in an accident)
- Ravi Gossain as Omkar Lodha, Bhavri's father, Toral and Kalindi's husband
- Sakshi Tanwar as Toral, Bhavri's mother, Omkar's first wife, Kalindi's elder sister (dies in Ep. 3)
- Pubali Sanyal as Kalindi, the antagonist of the story, the vengeful sister of Toral, Omkar's second wife, Bhavri's aunt and stepmother
- Mouni Roy as Roop, Maithili's aunt, Vasundhara's daughter, Pukhraj's sister, Badri's love-interest
- Jatin Shah as Badri, Bhavri's uncle, Omkar's younger brother, Roop's lover
- Krutika Desai Khan as Maya, Anadi's mother
- Navneet Nishan as Shaurya's grandmother
