= Sulagna Panigrahi =

Indian television and film actress

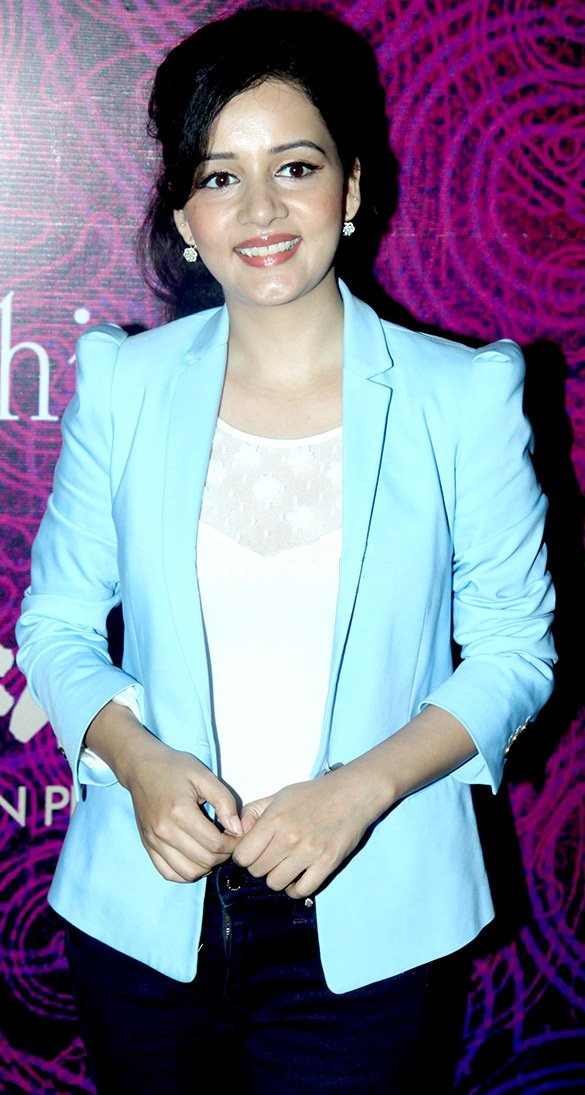
- Panigrahi at the audio release & First look of Ek Adhbut Dakshina... Guru Dakshina in 2016
- Born: Brahmapur, Odisha, India
- Other name: Savithri
- Occupations: Actress, producer
- Spouse: Biswa Kalyan Rath (m. 2020)

Sulagna Panigrahi is an Indian television and film actress. In her debut role, she played the lead role in the television serial Amber Dhara as Dhara, and went on to play the principal character in Do Saheliyaan. She further did a grey role as Sakshi Rajvansh in Bidaai, until getting her big break in the Bhatt banner film Murder 2 as Reshma. She married stand-up comedian Biswa Kalyan Rath on 9 December 2020. She played the lead role in StarPlus historical drama, titled Vidrohi .

== Career ==
Panigrahi made her television debut with the show Amber Dhara, where she played the character of Dhara, based on a story of conjoined twins. The series aired on Sony Entertainment Television from September 2007 to March 2008. Her second show was Do Saheliyaan, where she played the role of Maithali, based on the story of best friends set in rural Rajasthan. Do Saheliyaan aired on Zee TV from March 2010 to July 2010. After this, she went on to do a negative role in the serial Bidaai, playing the role of Sakshi.

She made her Bollywood debut in the 2011 thriller Murder 2, a sequel to the 2004 hit Murder, under the banner of Vishesh Films. She played the role of Reshma, a poor college student, who in need of money for her family to survive, chooses to become a part-time prostitute and falls victim to a psychopathic serial killer. Her role was well-received with positive reviews from critics around the media. After Murder 2, she has done independent and content driven Hindi films with strong performances like Rave, starring Rajkumar Rao and Divyendu Sharma and Gurudakshina, with Girish Karnad and Rupa Ganguly. Recently, she was seen in the movie Raid, starring Ajay Devgn, in which she played the role of a girl Tara, who was the main informer of the income tax officer played by Ajay Devgn. She starred in Marathi with the romantic film Ishq Wala Love, where she was paired opposite Adinath Kothare. Apart from starring in the film, she also did the full costume styling for her character herself. Her performance was appreciated by the critics and audience alike, specially complimenting the chemistry between the two actors. One of her most awaited projects is the Tamil film Isai, directed, produced and performed by S. J. Suryah. This will be her debut film in Tamil and will also mark the comeback of S. J. Suryah as a director in Tamil film industry after almost 9 years, at present she is working in a video series Married Woman Diaries Part 2.

Sulagna was featured as top six finalists in the category of "Indian Affairs Most Promising & Emerging Actress of the Year 2018" at 2018 India Leadership Conclave Awards Founded by Satya Brahma.

== Filmography ==
Year	Film	Role	Language	Notes
2011	Murder 2	Reshma	Hindi	Hindi debut
2014	Ishq Wala Love	Ovi	Marathi	Marathi debut
2015	Isai	Jenny	Tamil	Tamil debut
2015	Guru Dakshina	Sanjukta	Hindi	
2018	Raid	Tara Singh	Hindi	
2022	Sharmaji Namkeen	Aarti Bhatia	Hindi	
2023	Pinky Beauty Parlor	Pinky	Hindi	
2024	Vijay 69	Deeksha	Hindi	

=== Television ===
Year	Show	Role	Channel	Notes
2007–2008	Amber Dhara	Dhara	Sony	
2010	Do Saheliyaan	Maithili	Zee TV	
2010	Bidaai	Sakshi Alekh Rajvansh	StarPlus	
2021–2022	Vidrohi	Radhamani Jagabandhu Raya Mahapatra	StarPlus	

=== Web series ===
Year	Show	Role	Studio
2020	Afsos	Ayesha Mirani	Amazon Prime Video

== Awards and nominations ==
Year	Film	Award	Category	Result
2012	Murder 2	Apsara Film & Television Producers Guild Awards	Best Actress in a Supporting Role	Nominated
