= Pinky Beauty Parlour =

Hindi drama-comedy film

- Directed by: Akshay Singh
- Written by: Akshay Singh
- Produced by: Akshay Singh; Bahnishikha Das
- Starring: Sulagna Panigrahi; Khushboo Gupta, Akshay Singh
- Cinematography: Gagandeep Singh
- Release date: 14 April 2023
- Country: India
- Language: Hindi

Pinky Beauty Parlour is a 2023 Hindi drama-comedy film directed by Akshay Singh, who also wrote the screenplay. The film stars Sulagna Panigrahi, Khushboo Gupta, and Akshay Singh in the lead roles. It was released in theatres on 14 April 2023. The story is set in a beauty parlour in Varanasi and addresses color discrimination through satire and humor.

== Plot summary ==
Pinky Beauty Parlour follows two sisters, Pinky (Sulagna Panigrahi) and Bulbul (Khushboo Gupta), who run a beauty parlour in Varanasi. Their routine is disrupted when a body is discovered in their parlour, leading to a police investigation that uncovers various secrets and societal issues.

The film explores the impact of fairness products and the societal pressures surrounding beauty ideals, particularly the preference for fair skin. It uses a blend of humor and drama to discuss these issues, highlighting the consequences of these beauty standards.

== Cast and characters ==
- Sulagna Panigrahi as Pinky
- Khusboo Gupta as Bulbul
- Akshay Singh as Shankar
- Arpita Banerjee as Rupa
- Vishwanath Chatterjee as Jata
- Abhay Joshi as Khanna
- Sami Akhtar as Jogi Malang
- Anupama Negi as Sulagna

== Critical reception ==
Pinky Beauty Parlour was featured in several international film festivals, including the MAMI International Film Festival, the International Film Festival of India (IFFI Goa), and the Melbourne Film Festival. The film was selected as the opening Hindi film at the Indian Panorama Film Festival in Delhi and received a special mention at the IFFI Goa 2016 closing ceremony.

Critics offered mixed reviews. Archika Khurana of the Times of India awarded the film 3.5 out of 5 stars, praising its message about society's obsession with fairness and highlighting the importance of inner goodness.

Film Information criticized the story and screenplay, stating "Akshay Singh’s direction is no better than his story and screenplay. Music (Arbind-Lyton and Chintu Saarthak Kalla) is okay. Lyrics (Arbind Kaushal and Prem) are fair. Akshay Singh’s choreography is below the mark. Rakshit Thantry’s background music is weak. Gagandeep Singh’s camerawork is below-average. Mayur Tripathi’s production designing hardly deserves mention. Sandeep Singh Bajeli’s editing is loose".

IANS recommended the film for its social message, particularly for younger audiences.
