= Vishesh Bhatt =

Indian film director

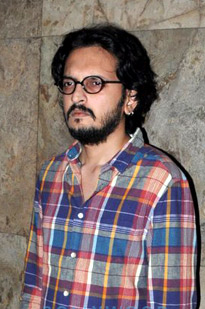
- Born: Mumbai, Maharashtra, India
- Occupation: Filmmaker
- Years active: 2008–present
- Relatives: See Bhatt family

Vishesh Bhatt is an Indian filmmaker who works in Hindi cinema. He is the namesake of the film production company Vishesh Films, run by his father Mukesh Bhatt and uncle Mahesh Bhatt, noted Bollywood film director.

== Career ==
He studied filmmaking at the Tisch School of Arts, NYU. Currently, he heads strategy, content development, creatives, marketing, and is responsible for all digital initiatives (including one of the first and largest online partnerships with Amazon) at Vishesh Films.

In his capacity as a writer and filmmaker, at the age of 21, he co-wrote the screenplay for Jannat (2008), along with Kunal Deshmukh, the director of the film. It was the first film to be made on the dark side of cricket. It went on to become a huge blockbuster. He also directed an entry in the Murder franchise, Murder 3 (2013). He took over the reins of his family's production company as a writer and producer with Awarapan 2 (2026).
