= Murder 2 =

2011 Indian film by Mohit Suri

- Theatrical release poster
- Directed by: Mohit Suri
- Written by: Shagufta Rafiq
- Produced by: Mukesh Bhatt
- Starring: Emraan Hashmi; Jacqueline Fernandez
- Cinematography: Ravi Walia
- Edited by: Devendra Murdeshwar
- Music by: Songs: Mithoon; Harshit Saxena; Sangeet-Siddharth; Background Score: Raju Singh
- Production company: Vishesh Films
- Distributed by: Wave Cinemas (India); Eros International (overseas)
- Release date: 8 July 2011
- Running time: 130 minutes
- Country: India
- Language: Hindi
- Budget: ₹13 crore (equivalent to ₹29 crore or US$3.1 million in 2026)
- Box office: ₹67.84 crore (equivalent to ₹153 crore or US$16 million in 2026)

Murder 2 is a 2011 Indian Hindi-language neo-noir psychological thriller film directed by Mohit Suri and produced by Mukesh Bhatt. It is the second installment in the Murder film series. A quasi-sequel to the 2004 film, Murder, it stars Emraan Hashmi, Jacqueline Fernandez and Prashant Narayanan, and debutant Sulagna Panigrahi. The film was released on 8 July 2011 to mixed-to-positive reviews from critics, and became one of the highest grossing Bollywood films of 2011.

The film is reportedly an unofficial adaptation of the 2008 South Korean film The Chaser, though Bhatt denied this and claimed that it was inspired from the 2006 Nithari killings in Noida. It is remembered for its erotic scenes.

== Plot ==
A call girl dances for a man dressed in a woman's outfit, who then brutally murders her.

Arjun Bhagwat is a disillusioned money-hungry ex-cop who now does jobs for drug lords and other criminals, though he draws the line at women and sex trafficking. An atheist, he struggles with his faith after his tragic family past but regularly visits church to donate money to the orphans. He has been in a casual relationship with Priya, a model, for three years; though she loves him, Arjun repeatedly tells her he cannot give her what she wants and to find someone else if she desires marriage and love.

A pimp, Sameer, pays Arjun to help solve the mystery of the disappearance of his call girls, who keep going missing. Arjun tells Sameer they need to use someone as bait. Sameer decides to send Reshma, a college-aged newcomer in the business, who has chosen this work to help support her single mother and two younger sisters. Reshma is sent to the house of Dheeraj Pandey, the cross-dresser, who in reality, is a psychopathic murderer responsible for torturing and killing the call girls. He tortures Reshma, then throws her in the well behind his house, where he dumps all the bodies.

Arjun discovers that Dheeraj is the murderer and informs the police. While Dheeraj is in jail, the commissioner calls psychiatrist Dr. Sania to extract his confession. They also cannot verify his address, since Dheeraj refuses to tell them and lives in a deserted home under someone else's name. Dheeraj tells Dr. Sania that he kills women because he loathes them for tempting and taking advantage of men. He'd also visited eunuchs to have himself castrated so that he would not feel sexual desire anymore.

While Dheeraj is in jail, Arjun, who has now become emotionally invested in the case and determined to save Reshma, investigates to find evidence against him. He learns from Dheeraj's family that they disowned him after Dheeraj beat and tormented his wife, who is now mentally unwell. He also tracks down private dancer Sonia, who was tortured by Dheeraj but had managed to escape, not going to the police since they wouldn't take the case of a call girl seriously. His clues lead him to an idol-maker who used to work with Dheeraj. The maker tells him that Dheeraj used to make idols of devils instead of deities and had killed the factory owner when he told him to stop.

Meanwhile, with no evidence, Dheeraj is released after his acquaintance, the influential eunuch Nirmala Pandit, bails him out. At the same time, Reshma escapes from the well and takes shelter at the nearby temple, where the priest hides her and calls the police. As Inspector Sadaa's men tail them, Nirmala and Dheeraj visit the temple where Reshma is hiding, as it's near Dheeraj's home. When Dheeraj learns Reshma is there, he kills Nirmala and the priest, who had both been unaware of his true nature. He then murders Reshma and escapes. Arjun arrives to find the cops already there and breaks down upon seeing Reshma's body, feeling responsible for her death.

Dheeraj targets Priya next, whom he lures by calling for a photo shoot. Finding himself back at the temple where Reshma died, Arjun sees the unusual idol there and remembers he'd seen that same idol outside the deserted house he'd driven by. Realizing Dheeraj must've made those idols and lives there, he arrives, fighting Dheeraj and saving Priya as police officers arrive. Sadaa tells him not to kill Dheeraj but Dheeraj plays the tape he recorded when he was torturing Reshma. Hearing Reshma's pleading cries, Arjun, in tears, furiously stabs him. Sadaa ultimately shoots Dheeraj, taking responsibility for his death and ending his reign of terror. As the film ends, Arjun returns to the church, his faith renewed, and stops Priya from leaving, implying that he has realized his love for her.

== Cast ==
- Emraan Hashmi as Arjun Bhagawat, an ex-police officer turned criminal, who is an atheist and is in a casual relationship with a model, Priya. He tries his best to search for and protect the missing hookers, including Reshma.
- Jacqueline Fernandez as Priya, a pretty but lonely model, who is in a passionate but confused relationship with Arjun.
- Prashant Narayanan as Dheeraj Pandey, a misogynistic and psychopathic serial killer who pretends to be a customer, calls the hookers and murders them.
- Sulagna Panigrahi as Reshma, a poor college girl, who enters prostitution to feed her family. She is later killed by Dheeraj Pandey.
- Sudhanshu Pandey as Inspector Sadaa, an inspector and a friend of Arjun, who helps him to save the missing hookers.
- Sanjay Batra as Nirmala Pandit, a man who used to be Dheeraj's mentor and is killed by him.
- Bikramjeet Kanwarpal as Commissioner Ahmed Khan, a police commissioner who tries to solve the murder case.
- Shweta Kawatra as Psychiatrist Dr. Sania, in a special appearance.
- Amardeep Jha as Reshma's mother
- Abhijit Lahiri as Dheeraj Pandey's father
- Jhuma Biswas as the Hostel Warden
- Premchand Singh as Goa Home Minister
- Santosh Sahu as a male prostitute
- Yana Gupta as Jyoti, the girl who is murdered by Dheeraj (special appearance in the song "Aa Zara")

== Production ==
=== Casting ===
Bipasha Basu was offered the leading role, but she refused. Asin rejected the part as she deemed the role of the female lead 'not powerful enough' and also declined the role. The role was then offered to Jacqueline Fernandez, though actress Sonal Chauhan was also considered. After declining the lead role, Basu was offered the item number "Aa Zara". When she declined again, the role was offered to Yana Gupta, who accepted.

=== Filming ===
Filming took place in Mumbai and Goa. The scene featuring the song "Haal-E-Dil" had to be partly re-shot in order to make it more suitable for use in television promos. Yana Gupta's item number "Aa Zara" was not shown during television promos as it was deemed too violent for audiences under 18. Instead, an alternative music video for the song was shot with Jacqueline Fernandez and Emraan Hashmi, which was aired on television and was used to promote the song. The original scene with Yana was still used in the film.

== Reception ==
=== Critical response ===
Murder 2 received mixed-to-positive reviews from various critics of India. Taran Adarsh of Bollywood Hungama gave it 4/5 stars and wrote: "Murder 2 is one of the finest crime stories to come out of the Hindi film industry. Also, as a film, it lives up to the expectations that you may associate from a sequel of a smash hit". Nikhat Kazmi of The Times of India gave it 3.5/5 stars commenting, "Murder 2 has enough to give the masses a mast time". IANS gave it 3/5 stars. Komal Nahta of Koimoi rated Murder 2 with 3/5 stars and said that "it doesn't have too much to offer in terms of entertainment as it is a dark film but its plus points are the abundant sex scenes and the good music. Its reasonable budget on the one hand, and wonderful recovery from sale of its satellite, music and worldwide theatrical rights on the other have ensured that the producers have made a handsome profit before release". Pankaj Sabnani of Glamsham gave it 3/5 stars, while writing that "an intriguing plot supported by superb performances, make MURDER 2 a 'killer' film". Daily Bhaskar also gave it 3/5 stars, stating that "if Emraan plus Jacqueline under the name Murder 2 don't arise your interest enough, then the story will surely do the trick".

Saibal Chatterjee of NDTV gave the movie 2.5/5 stars. Raja Sen of Rediff gave it 1.5/5 stars and wrote in his review: "Murder 2 is flat, boring and not worth talking about. Even Emraan, sporting less stubble than usual, seems baby-faced as he goes through the motions. It might be inspired by some obscure film, but I don't even care enough to look for its name. By now, I've come to accept that the Bhatts have a bigger DVD collection than me. I do wish they'd stop flaunting it, though". Sudhish Kamath of The Hindu said: "At best, Murder 2 is a show reel for the talented Prashant Narayanan, a men's room glossy featuring the saucy Jacqueline Fernandez and just another day on the job for serial kisser Emraan Hashmi".

=== Box office ===
The film opened to full houses across India with occupancy ranging from 70 to 100%, earning ₹70 million (US$750,000). The film grossed ₹228 million (US$2.4 million) in its opening weekend. After the weekend, the film grossed ₹47.5 million (US$510,000) on Monday, ₹37.5 million (US$400,000) on Tuesday and ₹32.5 million (US$350,000) on Wednesday. The film went on to gross ₹36.5 crore (US$3.9 million) in its first week, although collections were affected on 13–14 July due to the bomb blasts in Mumbai on 11 July 2011.

As of February 2012, Box Office India claimed that it was the 28th biggest opening week of all time. The movie dominated the single screens despite new releases and grossed ₹20.50 crore (US$2.2 million) in the second week despite limited multiplex release. Murder 2 grossed approximately ₹850 million (US$9.1 million) at the Indian box office. The all India distributor share stood at ₹250 million (US$2.7 million).

== Soundtrack ==
Murder 2

Studio album by Harshit Saxena, Mithoon, Sangeet Haldipur, Siddharth Haldipur
- Released: 30 May 2011
- Genre: Feature film soundtrack
- Length: 40:29
- Label: T-Series

=== Track listing ===
The film's music was to be composed by the original film composer of the previous installments Anu Malik. He even recorded the first song but was replaced by new composers. The film's score was composed by Raju Singh, while the soundtrack was eventually composed by Mithoon, Harshit Saxena and Sangeet-Siddharth. The lyrics were written by Mithoon, Kumaar, and Sayeed Quadri.

No.	Title	Music	Singer(s)	Length
1.	"Haal-E-Dil"	Harshit Saxena	Harshit Saxena	5:46
2.	"Aa Zara"	Sangeet Haldipur, Siddharth Haldipur	Sunidhi Chauhan	4:57
3.	"Aye Khuda"	Mithoon	Mithoon, Kshitij Tarey and Saim Bhat	6:50
4.	"Phir Mohabbat"	Mithoon	Mohammed Irfan, Arijit Singh, Saim Bhat	5:29
5.	"Tujhko Bhulana"	Sangeet Haldipur, Siddharth Haldipur	Sangeet Haldipur, Roshni Baptist	3:40
6.	"Aa Zara" (Reloaded)	Sangeet Haldipur, Siddharth Haldipur	Sunidhi Chauhan	5:12
7.	"Haal-E-Dil" (Acoustic)	Harshit Saxena	Harshit Saxena	5:00
8.	"Aye Khuda" (Remix)	Mithoon	Mithoon, Kshitij Tarey and Saim Bhat	3:35
Total length:				40:29

=== Reception ===
The album received positive reviews from critics. Joginder Tuteja from Bollywood Hungama gave the album a 3/5 stars saying that "Murder 2 turns out to be a good deal overall". Musicaloud gave the album 3.5/5 stars.

== Awards and nominations ==
Award ceremony	Category	Result	Recipient	Source
Screen Awards	Best Actor in Negative Role	Won	Prashant Narayanan	
Stardust Awards	Best Actor (Thriller/Action)	Won	Emraan Hashmi	
Stardust Awards	Best Actress (Thriller/Action)	Nominated	Jacqueline Fernandez	
Stardust Awards	Stardust Award for Breakthrough Supporting Performance – Male	Nominated	Prashant Narayanan	
Stardust Awards	Stardust Award for Standout Performance by a Music Director	Nominated	Sangeet & Siddharth Haldipur – Tujhko Bhulaana And Aa Zaraa Murder 2	
Apsara Film & Television Producers Guild Awards	Best Actor	Won	Emraan Hashmi	
Apsara Film & Television Producers Guild Awards	Best Performance in Negative Role	Nominated	Prashant Narayanan	
Apsara Film & Television Producers Guild Awards	Best Actress in Supporting Role	Nominated	Sulagna Panigrahi	
Apsara Film & Television Producers Guild Awards	Best Playback Singer – Male	Nominated	Mohammed Irfan	
Apsara Film & Television Producers Guild Awards	Best Playback Singer- Female	Nominated	Sunidhi Chauhan	
4th Mirchi Music Awards	Upcoming Male Vocalist of The Year	Nominated	Harshit Saxena – "Haal-E-Dil"	
4th Mirchi Music Awards	Upcoming Music Composer of The Year	Won	Harshit Saxena – "Haal-E-Dil"	

== Sequel ==
After the success of the first two installments, the producers released a third film Murder 3, on 15 February 2013. The film, which was an official remake of The Hidden Face, starred Randeep Hooda, Aditi Rao Hydari and Sara Loren in lead roles. However, unlike the earlier parts, it was an average grosser at the box office.
