= Vidrohi (TV series) =

Indian pre-independence period drama

- Genre: Historical drama
- Created by: Subrat Sinha Dr Bodhisattva
- Starring: Sharad Malhotra; Hemal Dev; Sulagna Panigrahi
- Country of origin: India
- Original language: Hindi
- No. of seasons: 1
- No. of episodes: 126

Production
- Producer: Subrat Sinha Dr Bodhisattva
- Camera setup: Multi-camera
- Running time: 21–24 minutes
- Production company: Gatha Productions

Original release
- Network: Star Plus
- Release: 11 October 2021 – 5 March 2022

Vidrohi (transl. Rebel) is an Indian Hindi-language historical drama television series which premiered on 11 October 2021 on Star Plus. It is also digitally available on Hotstar. Produced by Gatha Productions, it stars Sharad Malhotra, Hemal Dev and Sulagna Panigrahi. The series is based on the times of the pre-independence British Era and explores the life-journey of Odia freedom fighter Bakshi Jagabandhu. After a run of 5 months the series concluded on 5 March 2022 due to low ratings.

== Premise ==
Set in Odisha 1817, in the backdrop of Paika Rebellion, Bakshi Jagabandhu, a rebel fights for the rights of his citizens against the British Era. Apart from the rebellion, the story focuses on his personal life. He is married to Radhamani. However, due to a political alliance formed against the British East India Company, Bakshi is forced to marry Warrior-Princess Kalyani daughter of Maharaja Mukund.

== Cast ==
=== Main ===
- Sharad Malhotra as Bakshi Jagabandhu (Jagabandhu Vidyadhar Mahapatra): Radhamani and Kalyani's husband. (2021–2022)
- Hemal Dev as Warrior Princess Kalyani: Mohan's elder sister; Princess of Badamba; Jagabandhu's second wife. (2021–2022)
- Sulagna Panigrahi as Radhamani Jagbandhu Mahapatra: Jagabandhu's first wife. (2021–2022)

=== Recurring ===
- Firoz Ali as Bheem Chacha: Uncle of Baxi Jagbandhu -(2021-2022)
- Sunidee Chauhan/Radhika Chhabra As Tilottama. Wife of Gadadhar, sister in law of Baxi Jagabandhu
- Danny Sura as Jeffrey Fletcher: The then District magistrate of Jagannath Puri district. (2021–2022)
- Anang Desai as King Mukund of Badamba: Kalyani & Mohan's father. (2021–2022)
- Avtar Vaishnani as Prince Mohan: Mukund's son, Kalyani's younger brother; prince of Badamba. (2021-2022)
- Chaitrali Gupte as Swarna: Jagabandhu's foster mother. (2021–2022)
- Zayn Ibad Khan as Gadadhar Vidyadhar Mahapatra: Jagabandhu's foster younger brother. (2021–2022)
- Sangam Rai as Pindki Bahubalendra. (2021–2022)
- Nikhil Damle as Khurda's King. (2021–2022)
- Krishna Choudhary. (2021–2022)
- Rahul Verma Rajput. (2021- 2022)
- Smriti Kashyap as Queen Chitralekha. (2021–2022)
- Saurabh Gokhale. (2021–2022)
- Jitin Gulati. (2021–2022)
- Priya Tandon as Amba. (2021–2022)
- Rajeshwari Datta as Panthara: Radhamani's mother. (2021-2022)
- Iqbal Azad as Charan Patnaik (2021–2022)

== Production ==
=== Development ===
Sulagna Panigrahi was finalized by the makers in April 2021. Along with Panigrahi, Sharad Malhotra was also signed by the makers in May.

=== Release ===
The first promo was released on 7 September 2021 starring Hemal Dev as the Warrior Princess Kalyani.
