= Jannat (2008 film) =

2008 Indian film by Kunal Deshmukh

- Theatrical release poster
- Directed by: Kunal Deshmukh
- Screenplay by: Kunal Deshmukh; Vishesh Bhatt
- Dialogues by: Sanjay Masoomm
- Story by: Kunal Deshmukh
- Produced by: Mukesh Bhatt
- Starring: Emraan Hashmi; Sonal Chauhan
- Cinematography: Manoj Soni
- Edited by: Devendra Murudeshwar
- Music by: Songs: Pritam; Score: Raju Singh
- Production company: Vishesh Films
- Distributed by: Percept Picture Company
- Release dates: 15 May 2008 (Lahore); 16 May 2008 (India)
- Country: India
- Language: Hindi
- Budget: ₹10 crore
- Box office: ₹41.5 crore

Jannat (transl. Heaven) is a 2008 Indian Hindi-language romantic crime drama sports film directed by Kunal Deshmukh and produced by Mukesh Bhatt. The film stars Emraan Hashmi and Sonal Chauhan in lead roles.

It was released on 16 May 2008 and received positive responses from critics, emerging as a commercial success. Its sequel Jannat 2, starring Emraan Hashmi, Randeep Hooda and Esha Gupta, was released in 2012.

== Plot ==
Arjun Dixit is a rigid, street-smart youngster with an obsession with making a quick buck. He meets a girl named Zoya who is looking at an expensive ring. He breaks the glass and retrieves the ring for which he is arrested. ACP Shekhar is amused but leaves him with a warning as he knows Arjun's father. Wanting to get rich for Zoya, Arjun steps up from playing small-time card games to becoming a bookie and strikes gold.

After impressing Zoya with his wealth, he calls his father for lunch in his new house. His father, a simple man who has lived an honest life, is happy to see Arjun's success but skeptical of his business methods. He tells Zoya that Arjun is a habitual and smooth liar. When Zoya questions Arjun, he is offended and blames his father's failure in life for his resentment toward him. Arjun is whisked off to South Africa, where he meets Don Abu Ibrahim and becomes his key match-fixer.

Rolling in money and enjoying a fast life with Zoya, everything is interrupted when the South African police take notice. Now an ACP with the CBI, Shekhar is summoned to assist in the investigation and contacts Zoya to help trap Arjun. She speaks to Arjun's father, who tells her to leave Arjun if he doesn't change his dishonest ways. With Zoya's help, the cops arrest Arjun, who is sentenced to 5 years imprisonment in the scene of IntervaL.

However, Don Abu Ibrahim uses his influence to get Arjun out of prison to use his skills for the upcoming World Cup. Arjun is released in 6 months and in the after scene of IntervaL, and Shekhar warns him to mend his ways. Arjun relents and starts working as a bartender, where he happily lives with Zoya, who is now pregnant with their child. Don Abu Ibrahim asks Arjun to participate in one last operation so that he has enough money for the future. Arjun reluctantly agrees, but Zoya overhears his conversation with a bookie and leaves to inform the cops.

Arjun is chased by Shekhar and the cops and shot in the shoulder. He calls Zoya and pleads to meet her one last time before surrendering. Cornered with Zoya, he surrenders. When he notices the ring for Zoya fell from his pocket, he bends to retrieve it. (Assuming that he is going for his gun), the cops shoot him.

A few years later, Zoya and her son are seen shopping in a supermarket. Zoya is unable to pay the full amount as she is short on cash. Her son notices this and discards his toy so she can pay the bill. Zoya realizes that he is not greedy like Arjun and smiles at him.

== Cast ==
- Emraan Hashmi as Arjun Dixit
- Sonal Chauhan as Zoya Mathur Dixit
- Javed Sheikh as Abu Ibrahim
- Samir Kochhar as ACP Shekhar Malhotra
- Vishal Malhotra as Vishal Grover, Arjun's friend
- Vipin Sharma as Kedernath Dixit, Arjun's father
- Abhimanyu Singh as Shakeel Ahmed, Abu Ibrahim's sidekick
- Shekhar Shukla as Patel
- Shakeel Khan as Shadaab
- Vineet Kumar Singh as Indian Cricket Team Captain

== Soundtrack ==
Jannat

Soundtrack album by Pritam
- Released: 1 February 2008
- Recorded: January 2008
- Genre: Film soundtrack
- Length: 39:58
- Label: Sony Music India
- Producer: Pritam

Pritam chronology
Race (2008)	Jannat (2008)	Kismat Konnection (2008)

The soundtrack of the film is composed by Pritam with lyrics penned by Sayeed Quadri, Kamran Ahmed, R. Mehndi and Neelesh Misra. The album consists of 6 original songs, one remix and one Power Ballad. Kamran Ahmed from Pakistan wrote and sung the smash hit Judaai. The music by Pritam received generally huge positive reviews and the songs Judaai, Zara Sa, Haan Tu Hai and Jannat Jahan became chartbusters. K.K. was nominated for the Filmfare Award for Best Male Playback Singer for his song Zara Sa while Kamran Ahmed won the MTV Breakthrough Artist Award for Judaai. Songs are as follows

Track #	Song	Singer	Music	Length
1	Zara Sa	K.K.	Pritam	5:03
2	Judaai	Kamran Ahmed	Pritam	5:02
3	Haan Tu Hain	K.K.	Pritam	5:25
4	Door Na Jaa (Not In Movie)	Rana Mazumdar	Pritam	5:51
5	Jannat Jahan	Rupam Islam	Pritam	3:43
6	Lambi Judaai	Richa Sharma	Pritam	4:48
7	Zara Sa (Power Ballad)	K.K.	Pritam	5:28
8	Judaai (Kilogram Mix)	Kamran Ahmed	Pritam	4:38
9	Zara Sa Reprise	Silk Route	Pritam	4:48

=== Reception ===
Professional ratings
Review scores
Source	Rating
Bollywood Hungama	3./5 stars

According to the Indian trade website Box Office India, with around 1.6 million units sold, this film's soundtrack album was the year's seventh highest-selling.

== Release ==
Jannat premiered at Gulistan Cinema, Lahore, Pakistan, on 15 May 2008. The film was released on 825 screens in India on 16 May 2008.

== Reception ==
A critic from The Times of India wrote that "Truly, this one's a case of a great opportunity going kaput". Raja Sen of Rediff.com wrote that "Jannat all comes down to the romance. The girl is a call center executive who doubles up as a stripper? The guy is a hardcore pro but bawls like a baby to make another bet? It is the unpredictability these two promise that makes Jannat interesting, even if ultimately a bit of a con job". A critic from The Economic Times wrote that "Alas in search of this heaven we only find hell".

== Sequel ==
The sequel to Jannat was released on 4 May 2012, under the title of Jannat 2. The main direction/production crew remained the same. It was directed by Kunal Deshmukh, and produced by Mukesh Bhatt and Mahesh Bhatt once again. Emraan Hashmi also appeared as the male lead actor again, opposite Esha Gupta, with Randeep Hooda in a supporting role. The music for the sequel was composed by Pritam. It was also commercially successful and grossed ₹650 million (US$6.7 million).
