= Stardust Award for Best Film – Thriller or Action =

Film award in India

The Stardust Best Thriller/Action Film is chosen by the readers of the annual Stardust magazine. The award honours individuals that have made an impact with their acting in thriller and/or action films.

The following is a list of award winners and the films for which they won.

Year	Film	Producer/Production
2010	Wanted	Boney Kapoor
2011	Once Upon a Time in Mumbaai	Balaji Telefilms
2012	Singham	Reliance Entertainment
2013	Jannat 2	Vishesh Films

== See also ==
- Stardust Awards
- Bollywood
- Cinema of India
