= Roopak Saluja =

Indian businessman (born 1975)

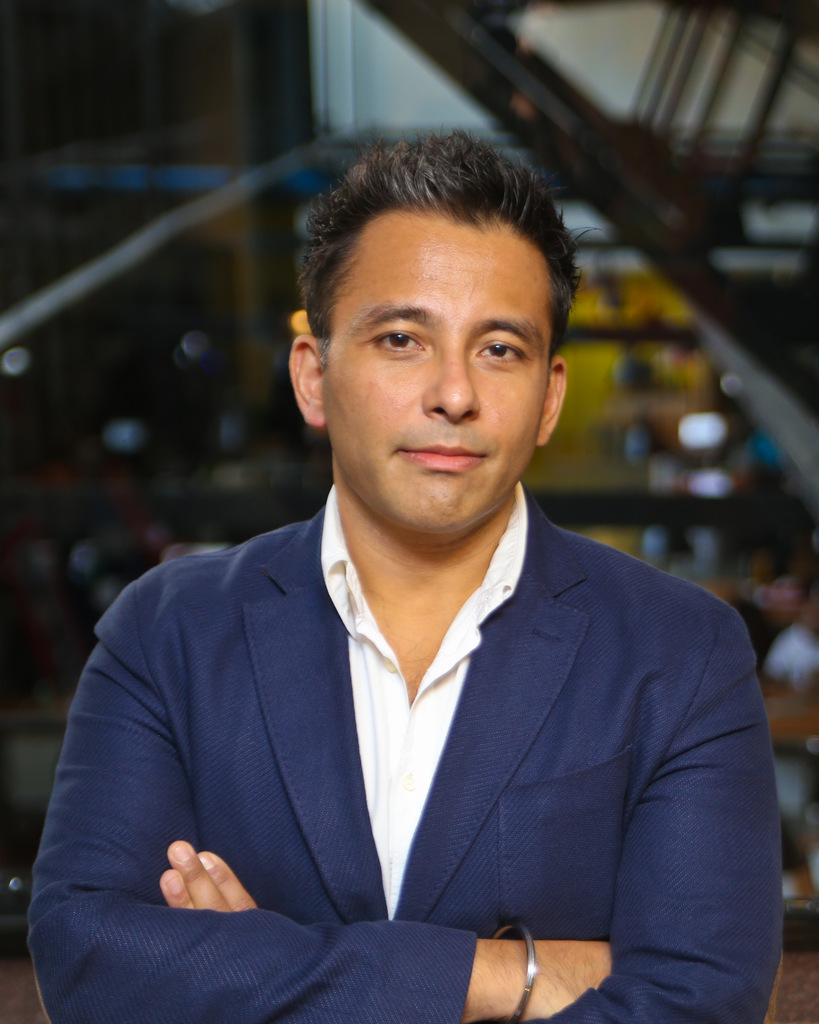
- Born: 25 July 1975 (age 50); New Delhi, India
- Education: Doon School & INSEAD
- Occupation(s): Founder & CEO of BANG BANG, Founder & Chairman of The 120 Media Collective, Media entrepreneur, Film producer, Podcast host, Angel investor, Businessman
- Spouse: Tara Sharma (m. 2007)

Roopak Saluja (born 25 July 1975) is an Indian media entrepreneur and angel investor. He is the Founder & CEO of BANG BANG, a Mumbai-Los Angeles production company, and the Founder & Chairman of The 120 Media Collective, a communications & content group comprising subsidiaries, Jack in the Box Worldwide and Sooperfly.

He has been featured in every edition of Campaign India's A-List of the Most Influential People in India's Advertising, Media & Marketing Industry since 2010, Campaign Asia-Pacific's "40 Under 40" in 2014 and IMPACT Magazine's Digital Power 100 since 2014.

Roopak is a Fellow of the Aspen Global Leadership Network at The Aspen Institute, serves on various company and advisory boards and is an angel investor in early-stage businesses. In 2011, CNNGo listed him among 20 people to watch out for in Mumbai.

== Early life ==
Saluja was born on 25 July 1975, to a Punjabi Sikh father, Ambassador Satnam Jit Singh, an Indian diplomat to several countries. His mother, Rinku Singh is of Nepalese origin, is a social worker and a top bridge player. He completed his schooling at the Doon School in Dehradun, India and went on to earn his MBA from the prestigious INSEAD in Singapore and France.

== Career ==
He started his advertising career at 23, in account management at Young & Rubicam Budapest. After that he moved to Ogilvy & Mather Paris to work for Motorola Europe, Middle East and Africa. He quit Ogilvy in 2003 to go to business school at INSEAD.

As his father was a diplomat and an ambassador to many countries, Roopak considers himself a "diplobrat", having lived in 13 cities, 10 countries, across 6 continents.

=== BANG BANG ===
In mid-2006, after graduating with an MBA from INSEAD, he set up a company called BANG BANG - India's International Storytelling Company. The AllWorld Network, ranked it at #2 on Top 25 fastest growing companies in India in 2010, across all sectors.

BANG BANG has been South Asia's leading producer of commercials and branded content since its inception. Having been in the business for almost decades, their clients and projects include the likes of Coldplay, Netflix, Ridley Scott Associates, Traktor, Partizan, Radical Media, AOI-PRO, Somesuch, Chelsea, Blink, Emirates, Ikea and many more.

One of BANG BANG's notable collaborations include a joint venture created with director Jim Sonzero, primarily focused on beauty, lifestyle and storytelling in July 2013. Its first project was a L'Oréal Fall Repair campaign with Bollywood actor Sonam Kapoor, and the company shot another spot for L'Oreal starring Aishwarya Rai.

In 2014, BANG BANG was ranked #3 among the Top 5 Production Houses in India by advertising agency professionals. The company ranked #4 amongst the Top 10 in the same list in 2019.

The company is also a part of PSN (Production Service Network), an association of the world's top production service companies in each territory.

=== Jack in the Box Worldwide ===
Jack in the Box Worldwide was set up in 2009 as the content-for-brands arm of Bang Bang Films. It combines content strategy, film, video production and digital media to create customized content for brands across multiple platforms and geographies. It has offices in Mumbai and Delhi.

Roopak is a member of the Indian Angel Network, a group of entrepreneurs who invest in start-up businesses across a variety of sectors and markets. In 2011, CNNGo listed him among 20 people to watch out for in Mumbai.

In 2014, Roopak was featured on Campaign Asia-Pacific's "40 Under 40" list among the region's strategic thinkers, suits, creators and planners.

== Personal life ==
He is a trance DJ, and has performed in Europe, South Africa and Thailand, and co-founding and running his own trance label, Procyon Records (Budapest and Paris). He has also acted in Marigold.

He married actress Tara Sharma in November 2007. They have two children together, sons Zen and Kai, born in 2009 and 2011.
