= Saaya (2003 film) =

2003 Indian supernatural romantic thriller film

- Theatrical release poster
- Directed by: Anurag Basu
- Screenplay by: Amol Shetge
- Produced by: Mukesh Bhatt
- Starring: John Abraham; Tara Sharma; Mahima Chaudhry
- Cinematography: Fuwad Khan
- Edited by: Akiv Ali
- Music by: Anu Malik; M. M. Kreem
- Production company: Vishesh Films
- Release date: 4 July 2003
- Running time: 122 minutes
- Country: India
- Language: Hindi

Saaya (translation: Shadow) is a 2003 Indian Hindi-language supernatural romantic thriller film directed by Anurag Basu and produced by Mukesh Bhatt. The film stars John Abraham, Tara Sharma and Mahima Chaudhry. It is an unofficial remake of the 2002 American film Dragonfly.

== Plot ==
Akash "Akki" and his wife Maya are doctors. When malaria strikes India on the Burmese border, pregnant Maya rushes over to help, despite Akki's disapproval. Akash soon receives the news of her death caused by a bus crash. The bus crashed into water during heavy rains.

Akash believes that on looking at the face of the corpse, one would be able to trace out the mentality of that person at the time of death; and so he desperately searches for the corpse of Maya. However, he could not succeed. Akash cannot accept Maya's death and believes strongly that she did not die. Akash himself has paranormal experiences where he feels that Maya's soul is trying to communicate with him. He tries to communicate with her through the hospital patients who have faced a near-death experience. Every patient draws a strange symbol, and one corpse starts talking to Akash when he is alone. Tanya, a close friend of Maya, tries to console Akash, because when her lover died in an accident it was Akash who treated her. Now, she believes it is her turn, and she believes he is hallucinating.

With the help of a nun called Sister Martha and clues, Akash decides to go back to where it all began – the border. There, with the help of a guide, he tries to find out about Maya but is not very successful, following which Akash jumps off a waterfall near the crash site and finds the sunken bus. He sees Maya's spirit beckoning him, and she shows him her accident and the incidents that followed. He goes to the nearby village tribe and asks if they saved Maya. They say she died, but they saved her soul. They take Akash inside and show him a surprise – though Maya died, she gave birth to their daughter. Akash thus realises that Maya was teaching him to trust, because their baby survived among the tribe without any medical attention despite being premature. He also realises that Maya's spirit was trying to reach him so that he could meet their daughter. He takes their child home and lives happily ever after.

== Cast ==
- John Abraham as Dr. Akash "Akki" Bhatnagar
- Tara Sharma as Dr. Maya Bhatnagar, Akash's wife
- Mahima Chaudhry as Tanya Ghosh
- Zohra Sehgal as Sister Martha
- Rajendranath Zutshi as Moses
- Shreya Ghoshal - special appearance in song "Har Taraf"
- Akshita Mutreja - special appearance in the end as Akash's daughter
- Vishwajeet Pradhan as Dr. A. Mehta
- Harsh Chhaya as Dr. Goenka

== Soundtrack ==
Saaya

Soundtrack album by M.M. Kreem and Anu Malik
- Released: 23 May 2003
- Genre: Feature film soundtrack
- Length: 61:40
- Language: Hindi
- Label: T-Series

M.M. Kreem chronology
Gangotri (2003)	Saaya (2003)	Simhadri (2003)

Anu Malik chronology
Mumbai Se Aaya Mera Dost (2003)	Saaya (2003)	LOC Kargil (2003)

The soundtrack was composed by Anu Malik and M. M. Kreem. The lyrics were written by Sayeed Quadri and Praveen Bhardwaj. The song "Har Taraf Har Jagah" is tuned in raag Darbari Kanada

Tracklisting
No.	Title	Lyrics	Music	Artist(s)	Length
1.	"O Sathiya"	Anand Bakshi	M.M. Kreem	Alka Yagnik, Udit Narayan	04:59
2.	"Aai Jo Teri Yaad"	Praveen Bhardwaj	M.M. Kreem	Sonu Nigam	05:32
3.	"Aye Meri Zindagi"	Sayeed Quadri	Anu Malik	Udit Narayan	06:28
4.	"Seena Pada"	Sayeed Quadri	Anu Malik	Shreya Ghoshal	07:08
5.	"Har Taraf Har Jagah"	Sayeed Quadri	Anu Malik	Shreya Ghoshal, Kunal Ganjawala	06:18
6.	"Kabhi Khushboo"	Sayeed Quadri	Anu Malik	K. K.	08:40
7.	"Aye Meri Zindagi"	Sayeed Quadri	Anu Malik	Shreya Ghoshal	06:29
8.	"Seena Pada"	Sayeed Quadri	Anu Malik	Udit Narayan	07:08
9.	"Aai Jo Teri Yaad" (Female version)	Praveen Bhardwaj	M.M. Kreem	Shreya Ghoshal	05:31
10.	"Aye Meri Zindagi" (Sad version)	Sayeed Quadri	Anu Malik	Udit Narayan	02:23
Total length:					61:40

== Critical response ==
Taran Adarsh of Bollywood Hungama gave the film 1.5 out of 5 stars, writing, "On the whole, Saaya falls short of expectations. The film has some engaging moments that keep you hooked on to the goings-on, but a handful of well-executed sequences can never really undo the harm done by a weak script and more specifically, a hard-to-digest climax. At the box-office, the film has some chances in select cinemas of metros, but at most places, the 'saaya' of success will elude it!." Anupama Chopra writing for India Today stated, "Debutant director Anurag Basu creates some striking sequences of suspense but his first half is excruciatingly slow. Moreover, only an actor with gargantuan talent and star power can carry a film in which he occupies almost every frame. Unfortunately, John Abraham who relies mostly on one tortured expression can't do it. What works better is Mahima Chaudhary's performance and Fuwad Khan's inventive cinematography.

Sukanya Verma of Rediff.com called it a "decent version of the original (Dragonfly)" but criticized it for being emotionless, stating "One point though: Saaya does not evoke a sigh, moisten your eyes, or create sympathy for its characters. And therein lies its drawback."
