= Murder 3 =

2013 Indian Hindi language film by Vishesh Bhatt

- Directed by: Vishesh Bhatt
- Written by: Mahesh Bhatt; Amit V Masurkar (additional screenplay)
- Produced by: Mahesh Bhatt (Presenter); Mukesh Bhatt
- Starring: Randeep Hooda; Aditi Rao Hydari; Sara Loren
- Cinematography: Sunil Patel
- Edited by: Devendra Murdeshwar
- Music by: Pritam; Anupam Amod; Roxen
- Production company: Vishesh Films
- Distributed by: Fox Star Studios
- Release date: 15 February 2013
- Running time: 123 minutes
- Country: India
- Language: Hindi
- Budget: ₹15 crore
- Box office: est. ₹27.75 crore

Murder 3 is a 2013 Indian Hindi-language psychological thriller-drama film directed by Vishesh Bhatt and produced by Mukesh Bhatt from Vishesh Films. It is the third instalment in the Murder film series and a standalone sequel to the 2011 film Murder 2. An official remake of the 2011 film The Hidden Face, Murder 3 was released on 15 February 2013 and became an average grosser at the box office.

== Plot ==
Vikram, a hot-shot fashion and wildlife photographer, looks at a video of his girlfriend, Roshni, who announces that she is leaving him, causing Vikram to become distraught. While drinking at a bar, he meets Nisha Sengupta and they fall in love. Nisha moves in to the flat that Vikram was sharing with Roshni. Vikram becomes a suspect in the disappearance of Roshni, however, the investigators find no evidence of Vikram's involvement in Roshni's disappearance.

It is revealed that the house is owned by a British lady who shows Roshni a secret room built to hide her husband just in case someone came to look for him because he was in the Indian Army in 1947. The room is self-contained.

In a flashback, it is also shown that Roshni, jealous of Vikram's relationship with one of his colleagues, decided to pretend she was leaving him. She creates the video saying she is leaving as she hides in the secret room. The room has some one way mirrors where she can observe Vikram's reaction. When she decides he has had enough she looks for the key and realises she lost it and is now trapped in the room with no way to contact him.

Nisha finds the key to the secret room, but she does not know what it is used for. Nisha eventually figures out that Roshni is trapped in the house because Roshni is able to communicate through tapping on the pipes in the secret room. As Nisha is ready to open the door, she pauses and decides not to rescue Roshni because she might lose Vikram after that. Nisha struggles with her decision, but decides to open the door and check on Roshni when the investigators give Nisha a package containing some images. As Nisha is checking on Roshni laying in a bed in the secret room, Roshni surprises Nisha and knocks her out with a glass bottle and leaves Nisha locked in the room. After Roshni comes out of the secret room, she sees the images and the package, which are pictures of Vikram and his colleague in compromising situations, shattering her. She decides to leave the house. She leaves that picture of Vikram with his colleague on the mirror and also sticks her necklace to show Vikram that she is out and then she sends the keys to the room to the investigator who actually loves Nisha. The investigator comes and arrests Vikram while Nisha is stranded in the room as both Vikram and the investigator have no knowledge about the room or the key. The final scene shows Roshni tearing her and Vikram's photograph and going on a highway road in a car alone, happy to leave the devastated and arrested Vikram.

== Cast ==
- Randeep Hooda as Vikram
- Aditi Rao Hydari as Roshni
- Sara Loren as Nisha Sengupta
- Rajesh Shringarpure as Kabir, Goa Police officer
- Karla Singh as Mrs. Fields
- Bugs Bhargava as DK Bose, Vikram's boss
- Allan Rajen Singh as gardener

== Casting ==
Emraan Hashmi, who played the lead role in the prequels Murder and Murder 2, was replaced by Randeep Hooda. Asin Thottumkal was offered the lead female role, but turned it down as she was not happy with the script. The role went to Esha Gupta, who eventually opted out and was replaced by Aditi Rao Hydari. Pakistani actress Sara Loren was cast as the second female lead.

== Production and development ==
The film was shot in Cape Town, South Africa and Goa, India.

Mahesh Bhatt said "Murder 3 is the 2013 equivalent of his 1983 controversial film, Arth. Then it was the institution of marriage that was deconstructed and 30 years later Murder 3 deconstructs love and questions its very existence in today's world of relationship crimes. Now that we have the official rights of the film (The Hidden Face), we look to doing it justice and taking the Murder franchise forward."

== Critical reception ==
Murder 3 received mixed reviews from critics.

Taran Adarsh of Bollywood Hungama gave it 4 out of 5 and stated that Murder 3 "is one of the finest thrillers to come out of Vishesh Films. An outstanding story narrated with ferocious enthusiasm. Vishesh Bhatt hits a boundary in his very first attempt!" Madhureeta Mukherjee of The Times Of India gave it 3 out of 5, while commenting "This one's no bloody Valentine, but watch it if you like it twisted." Komal Nahta wrote, "On the whole, Murder 3 is a fair entertainer." Nabanita of OneIndia also gave it 3 out of 5 while commenting that it has thrills but it fails to captivate.

Roshni Devi of Koimoi gave it 2.5 out of 5, saying that it is worth a watch. Saibal Chatterjee of NDTV gave it 2.5/5 stars and stated 'Murder 3, a thriller that vacillates between the taut to the toxic, packs enough punch and panache to keep the audience glued, if not sweep them off their feet. It tweaks the formula just a tad – it goes somewhat easy on the erotic component of the Murder franchise, opts for a markedly stronger emotional spine, and gives the female characters more than usual space.' Anupama Chopra gave it 2/5 while writing that 'With a little more imagination, Murder 3 could have been deliciously dark'. Sukanya Verma for Rediff.com has given 2/5 stars and says Murder 3 has some badly-acted thrills.

== Soundtrack ==
Murder 3

Soundtrack album by Pritam, Anupam Amod & Roxen
- Released: 2 February 2013
- Genre: Film soundtrack
- Length: 32:01
- Label: Sony Music India
- Producer: Vishesh Films

Pritam chronology
Race 2 (2012)	Murder 3 (2013)	I Love New Year (2013)

Anupam Amod chronology
Rush (2012)	Murder 3 (2013)	Once Upon ay Time in Mumbai Dobaara! (2013)

Roxen chronology
Blood Money (2012)	Murder 3 (2013)	Shootout at Wadala (2013)

The soundtrack of the film is composed by Pritam, Anupam Amod & Roxen (band). The lyrics are penned by Sayeed Quadri. The soundtrack was released on 2 February 2013. The songs were immensely popular specially the songs "Teri Jhuki Nazar" and "Hum Jee Lenge" was immensely popular among the masses while the other tracks like "Mat Azma Re" and "Jaata Hai Tujh Tak" were also very popular gaining good critical review and mass appeal. The music focused on the Rock Genre and was unique in the Murder brand.

The soundtrack received a positive critical response.

=== Track list ===
The soundtrack consists of 8 tracks which are composed by Pritam, Anupam Amod & Roxen Band.

Track No	Song	Singer(s)	Composer
1	Teri Jhuki Nazar	Shafqat Amanat Ali	Pritam
2	Mat Azma Re	K.K.	Pritam
3	Jaata Hai Tujh Tak	Nikhil D'Souza	Anupam Amod & Pritam
4	Hum Jee Lenge	Mustafa Zahid	Roxen (Band)
5	Teri Jhuki Nazar (Film Version)	Shafqat Amanat Ali	Pritam
6	Jaata Hai Tujh Tak (Film Version)	Nikhil D'Souza	Pritam, Anupam Amod
7	Hum Jee Lenge (Rock Version)	Mustafa Zahid	Roxen (Band)
