= Tara Sharma =

English actress, model and television presenter (born 1977)

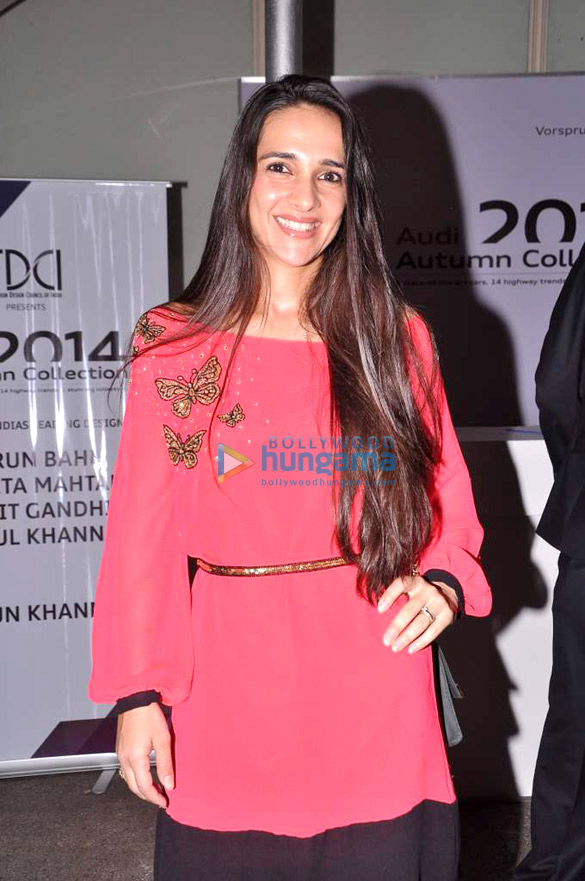
- Born: 11 January 1977 (age 49); London, England
- Education: United World College of the Adriatic; London School of Economics; Bombay International School
- Occupations: Actress; Model; Television presenter
- Years active: 2002–present
- Spouse: Roopak Saluja (m. 2007)
- Children: 2
- Parent(s): Partap Sharma (father); Susan Sharma (mother)

Tara Sharma (born 11 January 1977) is an English actress, model, entrepreneur, creator, co-producer and host of The Tara Sharma Show. She is the daughter of authors Partap Sharma and Susan Sharma. She made her Bollywood debut in Anupam Kher directorial debut Om Jai Jagadish in 2002. Then she went onto star in various commercially and critically hit films like Saaya (2003),Masti (2004), Page 3 (2005), Khosla Ka Ghosla (2006), Maharathi (2008), Mumbai Cutting (2009), Dulha Mil Gaya (2010) and Kadakh (2019). Apart from Hindi films, she has appeared in English television shows and English films like Raven: The Secret Temple (2007) and The Other End of the Line (2008).

== Early life and education ==
Tara was born to an Indian author and playwright Partap Sharma and British artist and author Susan Sharma. She studied at the Bombay International School and the United World College of the Adriatic, Italy. Thereafter, she completed her B.Sc in Management at the London School of Economics.

== Career ==
After graduating from LSE, Sharma was a financial consultant at Citibank and Accenture. She appeared in advertisements for Lakme, Garnier, Liril, and Pepsi, the third included a commercial with Shah Rukh Khan which proved to be a stepping stone into movies.

She debuted in Anupam Kher's Om Jai Jagadish, followed by Khosla Ka Ghosla, Page 3, Saaya, and Masti.

Sharma creates, co-produces and hosts The Tara Sharma Show, a multi-platform show to discuss topical family, parenting, women's and children's issues, with a view to bringing about positive change. The show has completed five seasons having aired on Pogo, NDTV Imagine, Colors, Nickelodeon and Star World.

== Personal life ==
She dated actor Akshaye Khanna for about two years, where Khanna described their bond as genuine, not necessarily romantic, on Karan Johar's show. They remanied friends even after breakup . She married media entrepreneur Roopak Saluja in November 2007. They have two children, Zen and Kai.

== Filmography ==
=== Film ===
| Year | Film | Character | Notes |
|---|---|---|---|
| 2002 | Om Jai Jagadish | Puja | |
| 2003 | Saaya | Dr. Maya Bhatnagar | |
| 2004 | Masti | Geeta | |
| 2004 | Bardaasht | Ramona | |
| 2005 | Sitam | Chanda | |
| 2005 | Mr. Prime Minister | Roshanara | |
| 2005 | Amavas | Tara | |
| 2005 | Page 3 | Gayatri Sachdeva | |
| 2006 | Aksar | Nisha | |
| 2006 | Khosla Ka Ghosla | Meghna | |
| 2007 | Heyy Babyy | – | Special Appearance |
| 2007 | Overnight | Tara | |
| 2008 | The Other End of the Line | Zia | English film |
| 2008 | Maharathi | Swati | |
| 2009 | Suno Na.. Ek Nanhi Aawaz | Anupama Nayyar | |
| 2009 | The Whisperers | Kavita | |
| 2009 | Mumbai Cutting | - | |
| 2010 | Dulha Mil Gaya | Tanvi | |
| 2010 | Prem Kaa Game | Sheetal Sahni | |
| 2010 | 10ml Love | Shweta | |
| 2019 | Shame | Sumer's Wife | Short film |
| 2019 | Kadakh | Sheetal | |
| 2023 | The Archies | Mary Andrews | |

=== Television ===
| Year | Title | Role | Language | Broadcasting Channel |
|---|---|---|---|---|
| 2007 | Raven: The Secret Temple | Satyarani | English | BBC One |
| 2011–2012 | The Tara Sharma Show (Season 1) | Self | Hindi | Viacom18 Colors |
| 2013–2014 | The Tara Sharma Show (Season 2) | Self | English | NDTV Good Times |
| 2015–Present | The Tara Sharma Show (Season 3,4, 5 & upcoming Season 6) | Self | English | Star World India YouTube |
