= Partap Sharma =

Indian playwright and novelist

- Born: 12 December 1939; Lahore, Punjab, Undivided India (now in Pakistan)
- Died: 30 November 2011 (aged 71); Mumbai, India
- Occupations: Playwright, novelist, commentator, actor, author of children's books, and documentary filmmaker
- Writing career
- Genres: plays, novels, children's literature
- Website: partapsharma.com

Partap Sharma (12 December 1939 – 30 November 2011) was an Indian playwright, novelist, author of books for children, commentator, actor and documentary film-maker.

== Background ==
Sharma was born in Lahore, Punjab, India (now in Pakistan) and was the oldest son of Dr. Baijnath Sharma and Dayawati Pandit. Sharma's father was a civil engineer who served as Technical Advisor to governments in Ceylon (now Sri Lanka), Tanganyika and Libya and later retired to their ancestral property in Punjab as a farmer. This colourful Punjabi village forms much of the backdrop of Sharma's novel, Days of the Turban.

Sharma's early education was in Trinity College, Kandy, Ceylon, and Bishop Cotton School, Shimla. Sharma received a triple promotion and completed school at 14 before going to study at St. Xavier's College, Bombay; all other universities in India required a minimum age of 16. He was married to Susan Amanda Pick and they have two daughters: Namrita and Tara Sharma.

Sharma's association with the Indian National Theatre, Mumbai, began in 1961 with the production by it of his first full-length play "Bars Invisible" and continued until the production of the banned "A Touch of Brightness." While working on his writing, Sharma freelanced as a narrator for short films and newsreels and directed a few documentaries for the Government of India. Sharma has voiced many national and international award-winning documentaries and short films. He is the voice on most of the Son et lumière shows produced in India, including the one still running forty years later, at the Delhi Fort, in Delhi.

== Writings ==
=== Books ===
==== The Surangini Tales ====
The Surangini Tales (1973) is a children's book, about Surangini, daughter of the village zamindar. She is the most beautiful maiden anyone has ever seen. Kalu, the poor weaver, loves her, but only the wealthiest of eligible young men can ask for her hand in marriage.

==== Dog Detective Ranjha ====
Dog Detective Ranjha (1978) is a story book about Sharma's Alsatian dog Ranjha. Sharma dedicates the book to animal lovers the world over, and particularly in India where some of the world's earliest animal stories were written, opening with,

"Even today the streets in India are open not only to traffic and human beings but also the friendly cows and bulls who wander freely as they please, sometimes absentmindedly standing in a bus queue or staring in with curiosity from the doorstep of a shop. There are even festivals for the less loved creatures, like snakes. Birds, of course, are often fed little morsels even by those who can hardly afford a daily meal for themselves. In the great epic, Mahabharata, it is said that when the legendary hero, Yuddhister went to heaven he insisted that his dog should be allowed to accompany him."

'Sharma has written a good, old-fashioned adventure story book, its rather solid virtues enlivened by the amusing device of having events narrated by the dog.' – Rosemary Stones, Children's Book Bulletin (UK)

==== The Little Master of the Elephant ====
The Little Master of the Elephant (1984) tells the story of a parched land, where people are dying or leaving. Chintu and his elephant Vivek go in search of water to save a dying uncle. They come back with a retinue of people and animals and a river of water instead of first a bucketful. This is just the beginning of their adventures together and their search for the meaning of life. Chintu finds love and is promised to be king and find the meaning of what he is looking for.

==== Top Dog ====
Top Dog (1985) has more stories about Ranjha, the dog detective. They live in Mumbai and Ranjha has been so skilfully trained in the art of tracking that he has become famous for the crimes he has solved. All the stories in this book are based on real cases and Ranjha tells us, in his own words, about some of the most puzzling he has helped to solve. He tracked down a local thief, he got involved in a particularly unpleasant case of what seemed to be ritual murder, he got to the bottom of a series of thefts from a warehouse that had reduced the owner of the goods to despair. He helped to find and return to her family a little girl, who had been kidnapped.

==== Days of the Turban ====
Sharma's novel Days of the Turban (1986) presents a picture of Indian Society from the inside. It shows a country in transition, where old values are under attack from new ideas but where, in the end, the traditions and ways of life still have their place.

It tells the story of Balbir, the youngest member of a wealthy Punjabi family, the descendant of a great Brahmin warrior dynasty. In the Punjab the family counts for everything. Over-educated and bored with life in a Punjabi village, Balbir wants only to escape, to get away from the demands of ever-present family. Most of all he would like to follow his glamorous elder brother Raskaan, who has escaped to Europe and become westernised and rich, a businessman in Berlin.

Searching for adventure and trying to raise the money to finance his escape, Balbir becomes entangled with local gunrunners. Venturing into the golden Temple at Amritsar with a message for the Sikh extremists who have fortified it, he is held hostage to ensure that his cousin Satyavan will provide the arms the movement needs.

==== A Touch of Brightness ====
A Touch of Brightness (1964) centres around Rukmini, a girl sold to a brothel in Mumbai and her relationship with Pidku, a street urchin, who tries desperately to rescue her from her life as a prostitute. Rukmini mesmerises Pidku with her visionary stories of the gods and her dreams of a married life as the wife of the blue god Krishna.. Even in a brothel, her extravagant optimism never ceases but only deepens.

In 1965, the play was selected for the first Commonwealth Arts Festival from among 150 works of Commonwealth writers. It was also invited to tour four theatres in Britain for a commercial run. In September 1965 the production troupe, sponsored by the Indian National Theatre, was prohibited from proceeding to England. To prevent the troupe of actors from going abroad to present the work, fifteen passports were impounded overnight. The authorities gave no explanation for this, but the reason was obvious. To quote directly from an editorial "Do these people honestly believe that the prestige of India will be enhanced by letting drama-lovers in London know the heartening fact of the existence of brothels in this country?"

The play was banned in Mumbai in 1966 on the grounds that it was set in the infamous red light area of the city and therefore 'dealt with subjects which should not be depicted on stage'. Seven years later, in 1972, the Mumbai High Court decreed that the censoring authority had 'exceeded its jurisdiction' and the ban was revoked. The play was produced by the Indian National Theatre in Mumbai in 1973.

Forty years on, in 2006 it was selected by Sahitya Akademi (India's National Academy of Letters) to launch a series of contemporary plays by Indian writers in English.

Meanwhile, the play had become a subject of academic study in universities in India and abroad. The play has also been produced and published in at least five countries in various languages. It was broadcast for the first time over radio by the BBC Third Programme on 3 November 1967 with a cast that included Judi Dench (as Prema/Rukmini), and music specially composed for it by the famous sitar player, Pandit Ravi Shankar. Well known literary critic Walter Allen wrote of this play when it was first broadcast "the most imaginatively satisfying" experience in his recent listening.

It was rebroadcast on BBC 7 in 2007.

In 1999, Geeta Citygirl staged the American premiere of A TOUCH OF BRIGHTNESS at Aaron Davis Hall in Harlem, NY. Partap Sharma was present for the opening night performance.

==== Zen Katha ====
The Zen Katha of Bodhidharma is a historical play about the founder of zen who was also a master of martial arts. Revered in China, Okinawa and Japan, the Indian monk Bodhidharma was, till the writing, performance and publication of this play, almost forgotten in his homeland India.

It tells the story of how Bodhidharma, born a prince in South India in the fifth century, had to discover ways to excel at unarmed combat because the royal Pallavas prided themselves on their wrestling skills. The Prince became a monk and fled from the demands of a throne to China, but could not so easily escape the woman who loved him.

==== Sammy! ====
The play Sammy! portrays Gandhi's journey from a tongue-tied lawyer to a shrewd politician and finally the Mahatma (Great Soul). It is set against the dramatic background of India's struggle for freedom.

Sammy, English

The play brings alive Gandhi's philosophy, pragmatism, and sense of humour. It unwinds Gandhi's concepts and his techniques for non-violent struggle, and emphasizes Gandhi's struggle has no enemy, no arms, no hate nor revenge, but only the inner strength of millions of ordinary men, women and children.

The play has won the 2006 META awards in India for Best Original Script, Best Director, Best Actor and Best Costumes. It performed to great acclaim in India, and Southeast Asia. After the European Premiere in Brussels in October 2006, it travelled to the US, UK in 2007. It then travelled to New Zealand and Australia where it received standing ovations.

Sharma's Sammy has also travelled to the Scotland. The story in itself will be a form of reviving the values of Mahatma in foreign lands through theatre and this play has been woven as the director (Pranay Ahluwalia) has tried to show history through modern eyes which would lead the audience into the era which shaped the future of India for generations to come.

90 Minutes for Gandhi, was staged at the prestigious Edinburgh Fringe Festival 2009 as a horizontal adaption of the original play under the banner of The Holycow Performing Arts Group, an Edinburgh-based amateur theatre group. The play has been very well received.

==== Begum Sumroo ====
Set in the late eighteenth century The Rebel Courtesan, Begum Sumroo (she is also known as Begum Samru), traces the picaresque adventures of a legendary historical figure from British India, Begum (Queen) Sumroo.

Farzana is a peerless courtesan who morphs into a powerful ruler, known for her political accomplishments as well as her amorous liaisons. After seducing Walter Reinhardt Sombre, a Swiss German mercenary, she acquires the kingdom of Sardhana from Emperor Shah Alam, and commands a fierce brigade of 3000 European and Indian soldiers. It is said that tourists who visited British India were advised to see the Taj Mahal, and to pay their respects to the Begum.

=== Staged plays ===
- Brothers Under The Skin, (1956)
- Bars Invisible (1961)
- A Touch of Brightness (1965)
- The Word (1966)
- The Professor Has A Warcry (1970)
- Queen Bee (1976)
- Power Play (1991)
- Begum Sumroo (1997)
- Zen Katha (2004)
- SAMMY! (2005)

== Documentaries and films ==
Sharma has directed documentaries, as independent producer and for the Government of India's Films Division, and Channel Four Television, UK. His film credits include:

- The Framework Of Famine, 1967, an investigation of how nature's devastation is compounded by human corruption and inefficiency; banned for its “ruthless candour” then released after other documentary-makers protested.
- The Flickering Flame, 1974, a study of the mismanagement of the energy crisis and its effect on the suburban housewife; banned and never released.
- Kamli, 1976, a short film depicting the status of women in rural Indian society.
- The Empty Hand, 1982, (co-directed) a prize-winning audiovisual about the art of karate.
- Viewpoint Amritsar, 1984, co-directed a film about the Golden Temple and environs in the aftermath of Operation Blue Star.
- The British Raj Through Indian Eyes, 1992, a documentary series telecast in 1992 by Channel Four Television UK. Part I: The Uprising of 1857. Part II: The Massacre at Jallianwallah Bagh 1919.

The British Empire and Commonwealth Museum in Bristol, UK, now has a permanent section entitled 'The Sharma Archive' consisting of 30 video and 67 audio tapes made by Partap Sharma. Interviews and footage of Indian nationalists, freedom fighters and writers. Indian perspectives on the Raj. Some transcripts available (CDs, Videos and Cassettes).

- Sailing Around The World And Discover America Yachting Rally, two video programmes directed by Sandhya Divecha and produced by Sharma's Indofocus Films Pvt. Ltd.
- British Raj Hindustani Nazron Se, 1995–98, A Hindi TV Serial.

=== Children's film ===
The Case of the Hidden Ear-Ring, 1983

=== Feature films ===
As an actor Sharma played a role in the Merchant-Ivory film "Shakespeare Wallah". Other films include the lead role in the following Hindi films:

- Phir Bhi (1971)
- Andolan (1975)
- Tyaag Patra (1980)
- Pehla Kadam (1980)
- Nehru – The Jewel of India (1989)
- The Bandung Sonata (2002) Filmed in China, Sharma played Nehru in this international film which was subsequently re-titled for release in China as Chou-en-Lai in Bandung.

=== Audio CDs ===
- Julius Caesar (2007)

"Commonly acknowledged as one of the most recorded (for advertising shorts) voices of India, actor-playwright and thespian Pratap Sharma's latest venture – a solo recording of Shakespeare's Julius Caesar is a literary tour de force. It makes for spell-binding listening as he holds the stage all alone, lending each character a completely distinctive tone and nuance. This recording ... is particularly remarkable, since Sharma was on oxygen at all times to combat emphysema, a lung ailment from which he has been suffering for the past few years." – Gaver Chatterjee, Education World. "Quite a solo feat. He lent each role a certain shading, using nuance, inflection…" -Indian Express.

- The Merchant of Venice (2007)

"The recording has an amazing range of voice – without break for changing from one character to another. Partap Sharma, the Golden Voice of India…" – Hindustan Times.

"Shakespeare comes alive loud and clear. Partap's is among the most marvellous voices in not just India but the world. This recording of one man speaking in so many accents will be a staple for young students." – The Times of India.

- Macbeth (2008)

"It comes as no surprise that the man with the golden voice needs no advertising or publicity for his work. Sharma, the man they call simply 'the voice' has voiced all the characters in the play, from the three witches to Macbeth himself – an aural treat. The series is also testimony to the writer-documentary filmmaker-actor's fighting spirit as he battles with chronic obstructive pulmonary disease and emphysema." – CNN/IBN

== Awards and honours ==
Sharma won numerous first prizes in school & university in debating, elocution & acting including first prize at the All India Inter-University Youth Festival, Delhi, in 1958.

1971 National Award for the lead role in the feature film "Phir Bhi" which also won the National Award for the best Hindi film of the year.

Cleo Award USA for best voice.

1976 RAPA First Prize for best voice in radio spots.

1992 the "Hamid Sayani" Trophy for a lifetime of all-round excellence in radio and television.

2000 Ad Club of Mumbai Award for Lifetime Contribution to Advertising.

2006 "Meta Award" for Best Original Script for SAMMY!

2007 "Yuva Thespo 9 Lifetime Achievement Award "

== Trivia ==
Hindi film actress Tara Sharma is Sharma's daughter.

== See also ==
- List of Indian writers
