= Geeta Citygirl =

American actress

- Born: Geeta Chopra; October 6, 1971 (age 54); New York City, New York
- Occupations: Stage, television actress, director, producer

Geeta Citygirl (born October 6, 1971) is an actress, dancer, director, producer and the founder and artistic director of SALAAM, the first South Asian American theatre, arts and film company in the USA. Based in New York City, the theatre company was started in the year 2000. SALAAM Theatre and Geeta Citygirl received the SAMA Award for Excellence in Theater in June 2005.

== Theater ==
In 2012, she was nominated for "Outstanding Featured Performance in a Play Female" by the San Diego Theatre Critics Circle for her performances in The Old Globe's production of Ayub Khan-Din's RAFTA, RAFTA.

Graduate of the American Academy of Dramatic Arts and the City College of New York.

She was part of the cast of The Signature Theatre Company's world-premiere production of Charles Mee's Queens Boulevard (the musical) to rave reviews. Other works include: Serendib at the Ensemble Studio Theater. The Wound at LaMama. Democracy in Islam at Theater for the New City.

In 1999, Geeta Citygirl directed the American premiere of the controversial play, A Touch of Brightness by Partap Sharma at Harlem's Aaron Davis Hall. She also directed Rabindranath Tagore's Karna and Kunti as well as Badal Sircar's And Indrajit. A graduate of the American Academy of Dramatic Arts NY and the City College of New York (CCNY), she was born and raised in New York. NY Stage credits include La MaMa Experimental Theatre Club, Theater for the New City, and Ensemble Studio Theatre.
