= Kadakh =

2019 Hindi-language film

- Film poster
- Directed by: Rajat Kapoor
- Produced by: Nikhil Chaudhary, Dinesh Kasana
- Starring: Ranvir Shorey; Kalki Koechlin; Cyrus Sahukar; Tara Sharma
- Cinematography: Rafey Mehmood
- Edited by: Suresh Pai
- Music by: Sagar Desai
- Production company: Mithya Talkies
- Distributed by: Sony Liv
- Release dates: 23 November 2019 (SAIFF); 18 June 2020 (India)
- Country: India
- Language: Hindi

Kadakh (transl.: Tough) is a 2019 Indian Hindi-language black comedy drama film featuring Ranvir Shorey, Kalki Koechlin, Rajat Kapoor and Cyrus in the prominent roles. The film, directed by Kapoor, is set on a night of Diwali celebration when a Mumbai based couple organise a party at their home only to face bizarre circumstances during the whole night.

== Plot ==
Sunil is preparing for a Diwali party at his house. Some hours before the party he is visited by a stranger named Raghav, who introduces himself as husband of Sunil's colleague Chaya. Sunil is having an extramarital affair with Chaya and Raghav knows about that. Sunil and Raghav have an argument, during which Raghav accidentally shoots and kills himself with a gun. Before Sunil could do much to hide the body, his wife Malti returns from the office. Sunil tells her about the incident and while they're discussing what they should do, guests of the party start arriving. Having no way out, they hide the body and welcome the friends. Among the set of friends, there is Francoise Marie, a self-described mentalist a single mom named Paro and Joshi, who cooks for everyone in the party. There are unannounced guests as well, who are Malti's uncle and her aunt, Sunil's friend Rahul, Rahul's wife Sheetal, Yogesh and his wife Alka and Sunil's office colleagues and Chaya too; very soon the whole house is filled with people. What unfolds next is the hidden rivalry between friends, drunken brawls, game of cards and several twists and turns finally resulting in soiled friendships and ruined relationships.

== Cast ==
- Ranvir Shorey as Sunil
- Mansi Multani as Maalti
- Palomi Ghosh as Chhaya
- Chandrchoor Rai as Raaghav
- Rajat Kapoor as Rahul
- Kalki Koechlin as Francoise Marie
- Shruti Seth as Alka
- Nupur Asthana as Paaro
- Sagar Deshmukh as Sagar Joshi
- Tara Sharma as Sheetal (credited as Tara Sharma Saluja)
- Cyrus Sahukar as Yogesh
- Sheena Khalid as Sheena
- Kaizaad Kotwal as Kaizaad
- Krishna Raaz as Radha
- Minty Tejpal as Minty
- Manoj Pahwa as Maalti's Chacha
- Yamini Das as Maalti's chachi
- Brijesh Karanwal as Watchman

== Production ==
The film was shot on a single location. Since the film is mostly set on the events of a single night, the shooting was done for 30 continuous nights in a studio of Andheri East, Mumbai. All the unit members actually slept in the day and worked at night to complete the film.

The film has been compared to Alfred Hitchcock's Rope (1948 film) which was an adaptation of Patrick Hamilton's play Rope (1929), itself based on the real-life murderers Leopold and Loeb.

== Release ==
Kadakh premiered at the 2019 South Asian International Film Festival. It released on 18 June 2020 in India distributed by SonyLiv.

== See also ==
- Remakes of films by Alfred Hitchcock
