= Jannat 2 =

2012 Indian film by Kunal Deshmukh

- Theatrical release poster
- Directed by: Kunal Deshmukh
- Written by: Kapil Chopra
- Dialogues by: Sanjay Masoomm
- Produced by: Mukesh Bhatt; Mahesh Bhatt
- Starring: Emraan Hashmi; Randeep Hooda; Esha Gupta
- Cinematography: Bobby Singh
- Edited by: Devendra Murdeshwar
- Music by: Songs: Pritam; Score: Raju Singh
- Production company: Vishesh Films
- Distributed by: Fox Star Studios
- Release date: 4 May 2012
- Running time: 150 minutes
- Country: India
- Language: Hindi
- Box office: ₹63.09 crore

Jannat 2 (transl. Heaven 2) is a 2012 Indian Hindi-language crime thriller film directed by Kunal Deshmukh. The film stars Emraan Hashmi, Randeep Hooda, and Esha Gupta. It is the spiritual sequel to his 2008 film Jannat.

Jannat 2 was released on 4 May 2012 and emerged as a commercial success. Gupta, who made her acting debut with the film, received a Filmfare Best Female Debut nomination for her performance. It is the second installment of the Jannat film series.

== Plot ==
The story follows Sonu Dilli, a street-smart, small-time arms dealer in Delhi who has the gift of gab. When he is interrogated by a tough cop, Assistant Commissioner of Police Pratap Raghuvanshi, he turns informer for the latter. Although helping Pratap puts Sonu in jail for a little time, he continues to purvey the ACP with information about illegal arms rackets as he has no other choice. But when Sonu falls in love with Dr. Jhanvi Singh Tomar and manages to woo her, he wants to leave the life of crime and settle down. However, Pratap, who is hell bent upon finding who the leader of the arms racket is, persuades Sonu to continue being his informer by promising him protection and a good life afterward.

Sonu's world is shaken to the core when he realises, after his marriage to Jhanvi, that Jhanvi's estranged father, Mangal Singh Tomar (Manish Choudhary), is actually the leader of the guns/arms business in Delhi. Soon enough, Sonu becomes a police informant for ACP Pratap, who has been looking for Mangal. Becoming a police informant, Sonu manages to convince Mangal that he is a corrupt and shrewd person who will be of use to his gang. Mangal embraces Sonu as his next in command. Sonu, caught between the devil and the deep sea, starts playing a double game. He neither gives information to the ACP nor tells Mangal the truth about him being a police informer. Secretly, he plans to run away with Jhanvi so that he can live a peaceful life with her. However, things get risky once a mysterious informer in the police force tells Mangal about Sonu's truth.

During a shootout, Mangal finds out the truth about Sonu and takes his whole gang after him. Sonu, on the run, rings ACP Pratap for help. Pratap then brings his whole police force to the scene. There, Sonu is surrounded by Mangal's gang, which is then gunned down by the police chief commissioner. With only Sonu, Mangal, and the chief left, it turns out that the chief is actually Mangal's informer, and they both follow Sonu to a deserted area. There, Sonu meets Pratap and tells him he is done and leaves to go to his wife. However, he is shot by the chief. Pratap, seeing Sonu get killed, shoots the chief commissioner and Mangal multiple times, leading to their deaths.

In the hospital, during Sonu's last words, he tells Pratap that his wife Jhanvi should not know about his death, and Pratap should tell her that he was a criminal who committed smuggling and ran away. After his death, Pratap goes to his house and informs Jhanvi that Sonu left the country to evade arrest due to Pratap's small error. Jhanvi, heartbroken, thinks straight and forgets Sonu, and moves away to carry on life as normal.

== Cast ==
- Emraan Hashmi as Sonu Dilli "KKC" (Kutti Kameeni Cheeze)
- Randeep Hooda as ACP Pratap Raghuvanshi
- Esha Gupta as Dr. Janhvi Singh Tomar
- Manish Chaudhary as Mangal Singh Tomar
- Mohammed Zeeshan Ayyub as Balli
- Sumeet Nijhawan as Sarfaraz
- Brijendra Kala as Dadda (ACP's Assistant)
- Arif Zakaria as Police Chief
- Rohit Pathak as Inspector Rajender
- Raftaar (Special appearance) as background dancer in the song Tera Deedar Hua

== Production ==
Jannat 2 began filming in October 2011, at the lines of Airport Express (Orange Line) of Delhi Metro. The shooting finally completed on 17 January 2012. The title of the film was earlier known as Informer and then Blood Money, however these titles did not receive positive feedback, therefore director Kunal Deshmukh decided to make the film a sequel to Jannat. Many actresses such as Prachi Desai, Esha Gupta, Kangana Ranaut, Jacqueline Fernandez, Paoli Dam and others were reported to be assigned as the female lead of the film, however, Gupta was chosen amongst the others.

=== Controversy ===
Mumbai based writer Kapil Chopra filed a case in 2012 against Bhatts for stealing his script for Jannat 2. The Bombay High Court asked the Bhatts to deposit Rs 1 million for the alleged plagiarism.

== Soundtrack ==
Jannat 2

Soundtrack album by Pritam
- Released: 30 March 2012
- Recorded: 2011
- Genre: Film soundtrack
- Length: 43:39
- Label: Sony Music India
- Producer: Pritam

Pritam chronology
Agent Vinod (2012)	Jannat 2 (2012)	Ferrari Ki Sawaari (2012)
External audio
- Audio Jukebox on YouTube

The music of Jannat 2 is composed by Pritam, with lyrics penned by Sayeed Qadri and Sanjay Masoomm while the title song of the film was written by Mayur Puri.

=== Track listing ===
No.	Title	Lyrics	Singer(s)	Length
1.	"Tu Hi Mera"	Sayeed Quadri	Shafqat Amanat Ali	4:33
2.	"Tera Deedar Hua"	Sanjay Masoomm	Rahat Fateh Ali Khan	5:47
3.	"Tujhe Sochta Hoon"	Sayeed Quadri	KK	5:14
4.	"Rab Ka Shukraana"	Sanjay Masoomm	Mohit Chauhan	4:59
5.	"Jannatein Kahan"	Mayur Puri	KK	3:48
6.	"Sang Hoon Tere"	Sayeed Quadri	Nikhil D'Souza	4:24
7.	"Jannatein Kahan" (Power Ballad)	Mayur Puri	Nikhil D'Souza	4:31
8.	"Tera Deedar Hua" (From The Heart)	Sanjay Masoomm	Javed Ali	5:46
9.	"Rab Ka Shukraana" (Reprise)	Sanjay Masoomm	Anupam Amod	4:37
Total length:				43:39

=== Critical reception ===
The soundtrack of Jannat 2 received positive reviews.

Jitendra Tiwari of Bollywood Hungama gave the album 4/5 stars, saying that "Jannat 2 is a terrific album which has practically each and every song working for it. A genre album which has love forming an integral part of the affairs, it ensures that each of the songs complement each other in a seamless manner." The Times of India gave the album 4/5 stars, concluding that "The music of Jannat 2 lives up to your expectations and is an absolute delight for music lovers. Thumbs-up to Jannat 2 music."

== Release ==
Jannat 2 released on 4 May 2012, in 1975 screens at 1575 theatres across India.

== Reception ==
=== Critical reception ===
Jannat 2 received mixed response from critics. Taran Adarsh of Bollywood Hungama gave the film 4/5 stars, saying that "On the whole, Jannat 2 is an engaging film with tremendous appeal for the masses. An absorbing story, a swift and coherent narrative, exemplary direction, fantastic action, soothing music and stellar performances summarize the highlights of this triumphant franchise." Gaurav Malani of Economic Times gave the film 4/5 stars, stating that "Overlook a few of its sinful indulgences and Jannat 2 can turn out to be a hell of a ride!" Madhureeta Mukherjee of The Times of India gave the film 3/5 stars, stating that "Jannat 2 is a decent crime caper, but doesn't shoot you between the eyes."

Rajeev Masand of IBNLive gave the film 2.5/5 stars, concluding that "I'm going with two-and-a-half out of five for director Kunal Deshmukh's Jannat 2. It could've been better, but it's not a terrible way to spend an evening out." Kanika Sikka of DNA gave the film 2/5 stars, saying that "The sequel of the 2008 film Jannat, the film is a predictable, yet partly gripping tale of a small-time brat who faces the results of his own deeds. Jannat 2 is worth a one-time watch, since there aren't many options for the movie-goers this weekend." Zee News gave the film 2/5 stars, stating that "Watch Jannat 2 for its catchy numbers (better still, buy a CD!). And since there aren't many options this weekend, you can count that as a reason to go watch the movie!"

Dainik Bhaskar gave the film 1.5/5 stars, stating that "For all those Emraan's fans, who can endure anything to see him on-screen- this one's for you. But still we would say, beware. This Jannat is far away from fairytales!" Meetu of Wogma gave the film 1.5/5 stars, concluding that "Overall, Jannat 2 is another one of those standard crime romances to come out of the Bhatt stable – only less engaging than the average Vishesh Films' product." Sonia Chopra of Sify gave the film 1.5/5 stars, saying that "A tired story with cliched characters propped-up by an OD on machismo, some dialogue-baazi, and a gorgeous heroine does not a film make. At least not one worth watching." Kunal Guha of Yahoo! gave the film 1/5 stars, stating that "If there is a Jannat anywhere, it is outside the screen playing this film." Raja Sen of Rediff gave the film 1/5 stars, concluding that "A lot would have been forgiven – as it often is with these producers – if the film had either a meatier plot or a more gripping narrative, but this one's just tiresome as the obvious story drags on. A couple of chase sequences, particularly one through the arteries of a Dargah, are slickly shot, but even these lose their charm as they get needlessly long-winded."

== Box office ==
=== India ===
Jannat 2 opened strongly at the box office, collecting ₹85.0 million (US$880,000) nett on its first day. The film collected ₹69.0 million (US$720,000) on its second day and ₹87.5 million (US$910,000) in its third day. It collected ₹235 million (US$2.4 million) in its first weekend, and collected ₹355 million (US$3.7 million) in its first week. It was declared as a "Hit", collecting 700 million (US$6.7 million) in its entire theatrical run.

=== Overseas ===
Jannat 2 was poor at the overseas market, collecting $500,000 in its first weekend.

== Awards and nominations ==
Award	Category	Recipients and nominees	Result	Ref.
5th Mirchi Music Awards	Upcoming Music Composer of The Year	Anupam Amod – "Tera Deedar Hua"	Nominated	
5th Mirchi Music Awards	Upcoming Music Composer of The Year	Anupam Amod – "Tera Deedar Hua (From The Heart)"	Nominated	
5th Mirchi Music Awards	Upcoming Lyricist of The Year	Sanjay Masoomm – "Rab Ka Shukrana"	Nominated	
5th Mirchi Music Awards	Upcoming Lyricist of The Year	Sanjay Masoomm – "Tera Deedar Hua (From The Heart)"	Nominated	
Stardust Awards	Best Film – Thriller	Mukesh Bhatt, Mahesh Bhatt	Won	
