= Murder (2004 film) =

2004 Indian film by Anurag Basu

- Theatrical release poster
- Directed by: Anurag Basu
- Screenplay by: Anurag Basu
- Dialogues by: Subodh Chopra
- Based on: The Unfaithful Wife by Claude Chabrol
- Produced by: Mukesh Bhatt; Mahesh Bhatt
- Starring: Emraan Hashmi; Ashmit Patel; Mallika Sherawat
- Cinematography: Fuwad Khan
- Edited by: Akiv Ali
- Music by: Songs: Anu Malik; Amir Jamal; Score: Raju Rao
- Production company: Vishesh Films
- Distributed by: Shemaroo Entertainment
- Release date: 2 April 2004
- Running time: 130 minutes
- Country: India
- Language: Hindi
- Budget: ₹5 crore
- Box office: ₹25 crore

Murder is a 2004 Indian Hindi-language erotic thriller film directed by Anurag Basu and produced by Mukesh Bhatt. It is the first installment in the Murder film series. Based on the 2002 American film Unfaithful, which was itself inspired by the 1969 French film The Unfaithful Wife, it stars Emraan Hashmi, Ashmit Patel and Mallika Sherawat. The film is set in Bangkok, Thailand.

Murder was released on 2 April 2004 and, despite receiving mixed reviews from critics, managed to become a highly successful venture at the box office, earning a "super hit" status from Box Office India. The film was a huge breakthrough for its lead actors, particularly Hashmi and Sherawat. It received an A certificate from the Indian Censor Board for its erotic subject and scenes. The film was remade in Kannada as Ganda Hendathi (2006).

It is considered as being a cult classic and began a film series, which continued with Murder 2 (2011) and Murder 3 (2013).

== Plot ==
Simran Sehgal (Mallika Sherawat) is a young woman married to Sudhir Sehgal (Ashmit Patel), a workaholic who was previously married to Simran's late elder sister, Sonia. Simran only married Sudhir in order to give motherly love to Sudhir and Sonia's son. She leads an unhappy, lonely and passionless married life. After accidentally meeting her former flame, Sunny Deva (Emraan Hashmi), she decides to engage in an affair with him. The affair starts to consume her life and Simran finds herself constantly lying to her husband and neglecting her motherly duties. After some time, she decides to end the relationship, but to her surprise, she finds that Sunny has also been simultaneously seeing another woman named Radhika. She regrets her act and tries to cut all ties with Sunny.

Meanwhile, Sudhir has started to have doubts about Simran, and hires a detective to trace Simran's whereabouts. The detective is able to provide Sudhir with pictures of Sunny and Simran having a romance, sex and sleeping together. He tells Sudhir that Sunny is a serial womanizer with many former girlfriends.

The next day, Sunny suddenly goes missing. The police come to Sudhir and Simran's house and inquire about him, on a report registered by his girlfriend Radhika (Surabhi Vanzara). Simran comes across the photographs of her and Sunny amongst Sudhir's things, and realizes that he may have something to do with Sunny's disappearance. Sudhir reveals that he went to Sunny's apartment to confront him about the affair, and the two men began to argue. The situation escalated, and Sudhir fatally beat Sunny and buried him in a panic. Realizing her fault and role in the situation, Simran supports Sudhir and takes the blame for killing Sunny. This develops and strengthens their love and faith in each other. Simran is arrested by the police and pleads guilty, while at the same time, Sudhir claims that it is he who killed Sunny, which confuses the police. Moreover, the body is missing from the burial spot.

In a sudden change of events, Sunny is shown to be alive. It is revealed that the entire situation, from initiating the affair to goading Sudhir into a fight was planned in advance by Sunny, with the help of Radhika. Sunny hoped to have Sudhir imprisoned so that he could continue his affair with Simran. Sunny isolates Simran and chases her into a jungle, where Sudhir arrives and the two begin to fight. Sudhir manages to beat him, and Sunny leaves as he sees the couple together, seemingly realizing their love for each other. However, Sunny then runs up behind Sudhir with a rake but is then shot in the back by a police officer, who arrives just in time. Finally safe, Sudhir and Simran reunite and take care of their son together.

== Cast ==
- Mallika Sherawat as Simran Sehgal
- Emraan Hashmi as Sunny Deva
- Ashmit Patel as Sudhir Sehgal
- Raj Zutshi as Inspector Rajvir Singh
- Saurabhi Vanzara as Radhika
- Sheeba Chaddha as Nargis Mehmood, Simran's friend
- Kashmera Shah as a lounge singer (special appearance in item song "Dil Ko Hazaar")
- Krish Chawla as Kabir Sehgal
- Prantik Shah as Pratik
- Indra Roy as Raj

== Reception ==
Murder received mixed reviews from film critics . Taran Adarsh of Bollywood Hungama rated it 3 out of 5 and called it an "engrossing entertainer". Anupama Chopra in her review for India Today called Sherawat "the hero of the film" but criticized the screenplay. At the box office, it opened well and grossed over ₹ 247.5 million. The film was elevated to "super hit" verdict by Box Office India after its second weekend. It was also the ninth highest-grossing film of the year 2004.

== Soundtrack ==
Murder

Soundtrack album by Anu Malik
- Released: January 31, 2004
- Languages: Hindi, Punjabi, Urdu
- Label: Sony Music India. Under Exclusive License from Vishesh Films

Anu Malik chronology
Murder 2 (2011)	Murder (2004)	Murder 3 (2013)

The music was composed by Anu Malik. The lyrics were penned by Sayeed Quadri and Rahat Indori. According to the Indian trade website Box Office India, with around 22,00,000 units sold, this film's soundtrack album was the year's fourth highest-selling. The song "Jana Tere Pyaar" was copied from Bangladeshi Singer Shafin Ahmed's song "Firiye Dao". The song is not portrayed in the film. The song "Kaho Na Kaho", sung by Amir Jamal from Pakistan, is taken from the 2000-released Arabic language classic "Tamally Maak" by the Egyptian pop star Amr Diab, whose lyrics are also featured in the song.

=== Track listing In soundtrack ===
No.	Title	Lyrics	Singer(s)	Length
1.	"Kaho Na Kaho"	Amir Jamal, Sayeed Quadri, Amr Diab	Amir Jamal	5:11
2.	"Bheege Hont Tere" (Inspired by "Mainu Tere Naal" by Najam Sheraz)	Sayeed Quadri	Kunal Ganjawala	4:31
3.	"Zindagi Iss Tarah"	Sayeed Quadri	Anuradha Paudwal	5:39
4.	"Dil Ko Hazar Bar"	Rahat Indori	Alisha Chinai	5:34
5.	"Zindagi Iss Tarah"	Sayeed Quadri	Sonu Nigam	5:39
6.	"Kaho Na Kaho"		Instrumental	5:11
7.	"Bheege Hont Tere"		Instrumental	4:32
8.	"Murder Theme"		Instrumental	0:36

=== Track listing In Killer Mix ===
No.	Title	Remixed By	Length
1.	"Kaho Na Kaho (Steamy Mix)"	Shibu Pintu	5:24 (With Dialogue 6:00)
2.	"Bheege Hont Tere (Hot Lips Mix)"	Shibu Pintu	5:06 (With Dialogue 7:04)
3.	"Dil Ko Hazar Bar (Heart On Fire Mix)"	Shibu Pintu	4:14 (With Dialogue 6:09)

=== Removed Track ===
No.	Title	Lyrics	Singer(s)	Length
1.	"Jaana Jaane Jaana Tere Pyar" (Removed due to copyright)	Sayeed Quadri	Amir Jamal	4:22

=== Bonus Track ===
No.	Title	Lyrics	Music	Performed By	Length
1.	"Mainu Tere Naal [Punjabi Soul Mix]" (Its a remixed track from the Najam's own album Mainu Tere Naal. The remixed track is used as bonus track to bring Bheegey Hont magic)	Najam Sheraz	Najam Sheraz	Najam Sheraz	5:45 (With Dialogue 6:50)

== Awards and nominations ==
=== 50th Filmfare Awards ===
Won

- Best Male Playback Singer – Kunal Ganjawala for "Bheege Hont Tere"

Nominated

- Best Music Director – Anu Malik

== Controversies ==
The song "Jaana Tere Pyaar" is a reported copy of the Bengali song "Firiye Dao" by Miles, a pop band from Bangladesh. Miles later sued the filmmakers, which resulted in the song being removed from the film's original soundtrack. The Bangladeshi band also sought compensation for 'hurting its business interests'. However, due to challenges in terms of uncertainty about the outcome, lack of information and lack of initiative from the relevant authorities on either side, compensation has not (as of 2005) been yet awarded.

Although the filmmakers denied all the accusations and said that they have bought the copyrights of the songs "Kaho Na Kaho" and "Jana Tere Pyaar" from Pakistani singer Amir Jamal whose album titled Kaho Na Kaho - A Fusion of Arabic and Urdu was released in 2002, Amir Jamal took permission from Egyptian singer Amr Diab, to use a section of his Arabic song "Tamally Maak"'s lyrics to be reused in the "Kaho Na Kaho" song.

== Remake and sequels ==
The film was remade into Kannada as Ganda Hendathi in 2006.

A sequel titled Murder 2 was released on 8 July 2011 with Emraan Hashmi and Jacqueline Fernandez in the lead roles, which was loosely based on the 2008 Korean film The Chaser as well as the Nithari serial killings of 2006. Commercially, the sequel surpassed the collections of Murder, becoming a blockbuster. After the success of the first two installments, the producers released a third installment, Murder 3, on 15 February 2013. The film, which was an official remake of the Spanish film The Hidden Face, starred Randeep Hooda, Aditi Rao Hydari and Sara Loren in the lead roles. However, unlike the earlier parts, it was an average performer at the box office. A fourth film is in development with Hashmi returning, after not appearing in the third film.
