= Sayeed Quadri =

Indian lyricist and poet (born 1960)

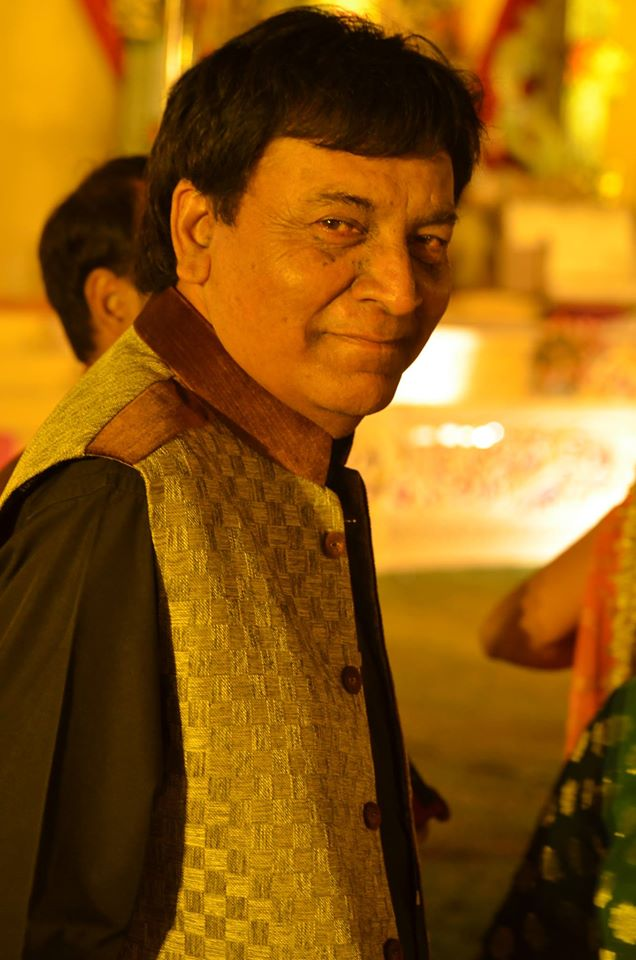
- Sayeed Quadri at Stardus Awards
- Occupations: Lyricist, poet
- Years active: 2003–present
- Website: www.sayeedquadri.com

Sayeed Quadri is an Indian lyricist and poet known for his work in Hindi cinema. He gained recognition with his debut in the film Jism (2003) and is best known for his lyrics in films such as Murder (2004) Gangster (2006) and Awarapan (2007). Quadri has been honored with several awards, including the Best Lyricist at the 6th IIFA Awards for the film Murder.

== Career ==
Sayeed Quadri began his career as a lyricist with the Hindi film Jism (2003), directed by Pooja Bhatt. Songs from the film, including "Awarapan Banjarapan", brought him early recognition in the Hindi film music industry. His writing style, noted for its emotional and poetic expression, helped establish him as a lyricist during the early 2000s.

Following his debut, Quadri wrote lyrics for several commercially successful Hindi films throughout the 2000s and early 2010s. Many of his songs featured in films starring Emraan Hashmi and achieved popularity among audiences. This period saw Quadri frequently collaborating with playback singer KK and actor Emraan Hashmi, contributing to multiple successful soundtracks.

After the success of Jism, Quadri became a regular collaborator with Vishesh Films. He provided lyrics for a number of films produced under the banner, strengthening his presence in Hindi cinema. His work during this phase included songs across various genres, ranging from romantic ballads to dramatic compositions.

Following the success of Jism, Quadri became a frequent collaborator with Vishesh Films. He contributed lyrics to several films including:

- Saaya (2003)
- Paap (2003)
- Murder (2004)
- Gangster (2006)
- Awarapan (2007)
- The Train (2007)
- Jannat (2008)
- Raaz: The Mystery Continues (2009)
- Murder 2 (2011)

== Awards and nominations ==
Quadri has received several nominations and awards for his work, including nominations for the Filmfare Award for Best Lyricist.

Year	Award	Category	Result	Work	Notes
2004	IIFA Award	IIFA Award for Best Lyrics	Won	"Bheege Honth Tere" from Murder	
2005	Stardust Award	Stardust Award for Best Lyrics	Won		
2005	MTV Immies	MTV Immies Award for Best Dialogue	Won		
2012	Mirchi Music Awards	Album of The Year	Nominated	Barfi!	

== Filmography ==
Year	Title	Songs	Composer
2003	Jism	3 songs	M.M Keeravani
2003	Saaya	All songs	Anu Malik
2004	Paap	1 song	Anu Malik
2004	Murder	4 songs	Anu Malik
2005	Rog	1 song	M.M Keeravani
2005	Zeher	3 songs	Mithoon; Anu Malik
2005	Nazar	All songs	Anu Malik
2005	Bachke Rehna Re Baba	1 song	Anu Malik
2005	Fareb	All songs	Anu Malik
2005	Kalyug	4 songs	Mithoon; Anu Malik
2006	Aisa Kyon Hota Hai?	All songs	Tausikh Akhtar
2006	Gangster	3 songs	Pritam
2006	Bas Ek Pal	1 song	Mithoon
2006	Woh Lamhe	3 songs	Pritam
2006	Zindaggi Rocks	3 songs	Anu Malik
2007	Anwar	1 song	Mithoon
2007	Life in a... Metro	1 song	Pritam
2007	The Train	All Songs	Mithoon
2007	Awarapan	5 songs	Pritam
2007	Dhokha	1 song	M.M Keeravani
2007	Aggar	1 song	Mithoon
2007	Bhool Bhulaiyaa	1 song	Pritam
2007	Showbiz	All songs	Lalit Pandit
2008	Jannat	2 songs	Pritam
2008	Kismat Konnection	2 songs	Pritam
2009	Raaz – The Mystery Continues	2 songs	Sharib-Toshi
2009	Billu	2 songs	Pritam
2009	Tum Mile	5 songs (3 songs along with Kumaar)	Pritam
2009	De Dana Dan	2 songs	Pritam
2010	Toh Baat Pakki!	4 songs	Pritam
2010	Lamhaa	4 songs	Mithoon
2011	Dil Toh Baccha Hai Ji	1 song	Pritam
2011	Murder 2	3 songs	Harshit Saxena; Mithoon; Sangeet-Siddharth
2012	Blood Money	4 songs	Jeet Gannguli; Pranay
2012	Jannat 2	3 songs	Pritam
2012	Barfi!	3 songs	Pritam
2012	Rush	1 song	Pritam
2013	Murder 3	All Songs	Pritam; Mustafa Zahid
2015	I Love New Year	1 song	Pritam
2015	Khamoshiyan	4 songs	Jeet Gannguli; Bobby-Imran
2015	Hamari Adhuri Kahani	1 song	Mithoon
2016	Ki and Ka	1 song	Mithoon
2016	Traffic	1 song	Mithoon
2016	Loveshhuda	2 songs	Mithoon
2017	Aksar 2	All songs	Mithoon
2018	Mercury	1 song	Mithoon
2018	Baaghi 2	1 song	Mithoon
2020	Malang	1 song	Mithoon
2020	Khuda Haafiz	2 songs	Mithoon
2020	Ludo	3 songs	Pritam
2022	HIT: The First Case	1 song	Mithoon
2023	Gadar 2	6 songs	Mithoon
2024	Vanvaas	4 songs	Mithoon
2026	Ikka	2 songs (1 song along with Raja Kumari)	Mithoon
2026	Awarapan 2	4 songs	Mithoon
