= Kunal Deshmukh =

Indian film director and restaurateur

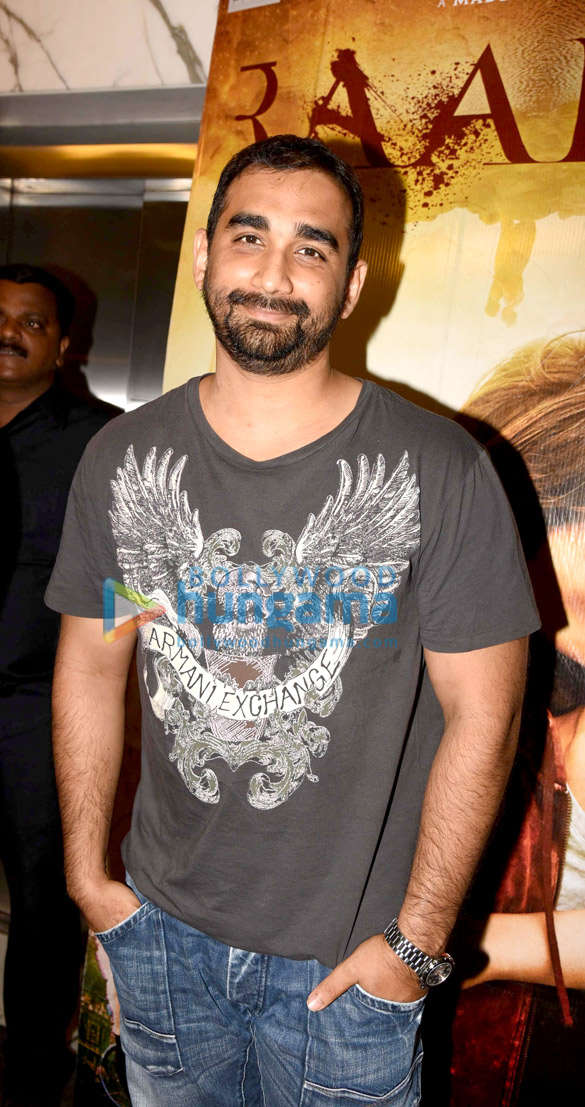
- Deshmukh during the screening of film Raabta at Yash Raj Studios in Mumbai in 2017
- Born: Mumbai, Maharashtra, India
- Occupation: Film Director
- Years active: 2008—present

Kunal Deshmukh is an Indian film director and restaurateur. He grew up in Mumbai, India.

== Early life and education ==
After finishing his schooling at Arya Vidya Mandir, Bandra, Mumbai and junior college at Jai Hind, Churchgate, he took up an advertising course at H.R. College. Later, he went to the US for a short diploma course on filmmaking. During that trip he also explored the NY dining scene with his friend Rikhey, which resulted in him eventually entering the hospitality industry. He then met Mohit Suri through a common friend Sahil in Goa, who suggested that he join him in his next film, Zeher.

== Career ==
He started his career as an assistant director in Tumsa Nahin Dekha (2004), Zeher (2005), Kalyug (2005), and Woh Lamhe (2006), under director Mohit Suri and Vishesh Films. In October 2006, he quit his job to work on a script. He made his directional debut with Jannat in 2008, starring Emraan Hashmi, produced by Vishesh Films, and was a major success.

He made a film in 2009 Tum Mile, based on the 26 July 2005 Mumbai floods, starring Emraan Hashmi and Soha Ali Khan.

In 2009, he opened a fine dining restaurant named Trikaya at Bavdhan, Pune.

== Filmography ==
List of Kunal Deshmukh film credits
Year	Film	Director	Writer	Notes
2008	Jannat	Yes	Yes	
2009	Tum Mile	Yes	No	
2012	Jannat 2	Yes	Screenplay	
2014	Raja Natwarlal	Yes	Story	
2021	Shiddat	Yes	No	

As assistant director

List of Kunal Deshmukh film credits as assistant director
Year	Film	Notes
2004	Tumsa Nahin Dekha	Assistant director
2005	Zeher	Assistant director
2005	Kalyug	Chief assistant director
2006	Woh Lamhe	Chief assistant director
