= Ek Adbhut Dakshina Guru Dakshina =

- Official poster
- Directed by: Kiran Phadnis
- Written by: Kiran Phadnis
- Screenplay by: Kiran Phadnis
- Story by: Kiran Phadnis
- Produced by: Aayush Phadnis; Eshaan Phadnis
- Starring: Girish Karnad; Roopa Ganguly; Rajeev Pillai; Sulagna Panigrahi; Rajesh Shringarpure
- Cinematography: Jeremy Reagan
- Edited by: Rahul Singh
- Music by: Som; Siddharth Chopra; Ismail Darbar
- Production company: Moonwalk Production
- Release date: 17 April 2015
- Running time: 2 hours
- Country: India
- Language: Hindi

Ek Adbhut Dakshina Guru Dakshina is a 2015 Indian film directed by Kiran Phadnis, and produced by Aayush Phadnis and Eshaan Phadnis.

== Plot ==
Set in Bengal, Guru Dakshina begins as an ode to classical dance forms, with the guru-shisya (teacher-student) relationship at the heart of it. An orphaned boy Dev (Rajeev Govinda Pillai) is adopted by Guruji (Girish Karnad) and brought to his dance academy in Kolkata, owing to his dancing skills. Impressed by his talent, guruji takes him under his wings. However, Dev's one-sided love for Guruji's daughter Sanjukta (Sulagna Panigrahi) changes their lives forever. Sanjukta finds herself seduced by Chhau dancer Gambhira (Rajesh Shringarpure) instead, who seems like a man of dubious intent. Turns out he is a Naxalite, on a secret mission. Dev suspects Gambhira's motives and warns Sanjukta but she doesn't pay heed. Dev is heartbroken and guruji devastated, when Sanjukta secretly marries Gambhira. Post marriage, Gambhira shows his true colours, thus ruining the life of his wife and Guruji. Meanwhile, an accident takes Dev to Himachal.

== Cast ==
- Girish Karnad as Guruji
- Roopa Ganguly
- Rupsha Guha
- Rajeev Govinda Pillai as Dev
- Sulagna Panigrahi as Sanjukta, daughter of Guruji
- Rajesh Shringarpure as Gambhira
- Samarjit Saha as Orphan boy

== Soundtrack ==
The soundtrack for the album is composed by Som, Siddharth Chopra, Ismail Darbar and lyrics are penned by Nida Fazli, Chi Chi Paswan.

No.	Title	Singer(s)	Length
1.	"Baat Ek Hai (Bonus)"	Vivek Hariharan	2:46
2.	"Baat Ek Hai (Reprise)"	Sawani Mudgal	3:13
3.	"Baat Ek Hai"	Vivek Hariharan	4:17
4.	"Jhoot Kapat"	Sukhwinder Singh	7:58
5.	"Jo Hota Hai (Female Version)"	Anwesha Dutt Gupta	5:07
6.	"Jo Hota Hai (Male Version)"	Rajeev Chamba	5:53
7.	"Zara Zara"	Shaan	3:52
Total length:			33:06
