= Anu Malik discography =

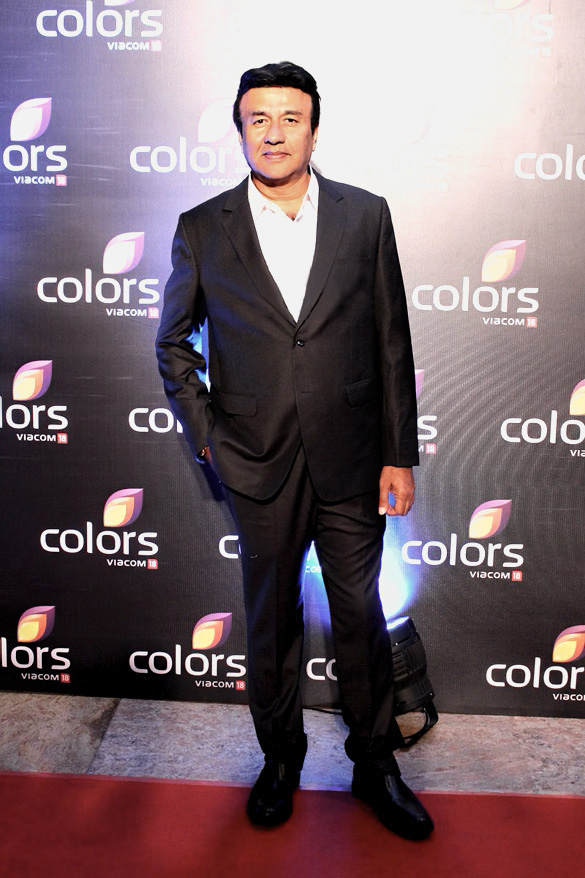
Malik in 2016.

Anwar Sardar "Anu" Malik (born 2 November 1960) is an Indian music composer, singer, music arranger and score composer. He is an Indian National Award and Filmfare Award winning musician, who primarily composes music for the Hindi film industry.

Malik started composing in Bollywood with the song "Zulm O Sitam Par Itrane Wale" for the film Hunterwali 77 (1977), before composing his full soundtrack for Poonam (1981). He was noticed for his critically acclaimed music for Sohni Mahiwal (1984) and got his initial breakthrough with Mard (1985). After a few years of success, Malik began to fade due to new style of compositions and new music directors in the 1990s. Malik reinvented his style of composition with fresh music in Phir Teri Kahani Yaad Aayee (1993) and Sir (1993), before getting a major breakthrough with Baazigar (1993). He followed up with several successful soundtracks during the 1990s and early 2000s as one of the top music directors for Bollywood.

Malik has composed soundtrack for more than 300 films and various private albums from 1977 till date and has worked with many lyricists including Anand Bakshi, Javed Akhtar, Sameer, Qateel Shifai, Majrooh Sultanpuri, Varun Grover, Gulzar, Faaiz Anwar, Anjaan, Poovachal Khader and Hasrat Jaipuri.

== Film soundtracks ==
=== As composer ===
==== 1970s ====
Year	Film	Notes
1977	Hunterwali 77	Only one song "Zulm O Sitam Par Itrane Wale"

==== 1980s ====
Year	Film	Notes
1981	Poonam	
1981	Aapas Ki Baat	
1982	Hum Paagal Premee	
1983	Ek Jaan Hain Hum	
1983	Mangal Pandey	
1984	Sohni Mahiwal	Nominated–Filmfare Award for Best Music Director
1984	Aasmaan	
1984	Love Marriage	
1984	Ram Tera Desh	
1985	Mard	
1985	Phaansi Ke Baad	
1985	Apna Jahan	Television film
1985	Jaan Ki Baazi	
1986	Manav Hatya	Television film
1986	Jaal	
1986	Begaana	
1986	Karamdaata	
1986	Pyaar Ke Do Pal	
1986	Allah Rakha	
1986	Angaaray	
1986	Mera Haque	
1986	Car Thief	
1986	Ek Chadar Maili Si	
1987	Insaniyat Ke Dushman	
1987	Dadagiri	
1987	Mera Lahoo	
1987	Hawalaat	
1987	Naam O Nishan	
1988	Shukriya	
1988	Som Mangal Shani	
1988	Maalamaal	
1988	Gangaa Jamunaa Saraswati	
1988	Ek Aadmi	
1988	Aakhri Adaalat	
1988	Jeete Hain Shaan Se	
1989	Ustaad	
1989	Vardi	
1989	Aakhri Baazi	
1989	Abhimanyu	
1989	Mujrim	Bengali film
1989	Toofan	
1989	Ladaai	
1989	Taaqatwar	
1989	Chahungi Tujbe Bar Bar	
1989	Daana Paani	
1989	Jaaydaad	
1989	Dav Pech	
1989	Kalpana House	Malayalam film
1989	Meri Zabaan	

==== 1990s ====
Year	Film	Notes
1990	Banglow No. 666	
1990	Khatarnaak	
1990	Awaargi	
1990	Gunahon Ka Devta	
1990	Paap Ki Kamaee	
1990	Doodh Ka Karz	
1990	Zimmedaaar	
1990	Tejaa	
1991	Shikari: The Hunter	
1991	Izzat	
1991	Ramgarh Ke Sholay	
1991	Bhabhi	
1991	Naag Mani	
1991	Maa	
1991	Naamcheen	
1992	Virodhi	
1992	Police Officer	
1992	Laat Saab	
1992	Radha Ka Sangam	
1992	Chamatkar	
1992	Tahalka	
1992	Dil Ne Ikraar Kiya	
1992	Maarg	
1993	Phool Aur Angaar	
1993	Sir	
1993	Phir Teri Kahani Yaad Aayee	Television film
1993	Baazigar	Filmfare Award for Best Music Director
1993	Jaanam	
1993	Tahqiqaat	
1993	Shabnam	
1994	Gopalaa	
1994	Madam X	
1994	Imtihaan	
1994	Khuddar	
1994	Aa Gale Lag Jaa	
1994	Vijaypath	
1994	Naaraaz	
1994	Main Khiladi Tu Anari	Nominated–Filmfare Award for Best Music Director
1994	Yaar Gaddar	
1994	The Gentleman	
1994	Zaalim	
1994	Hum Hain Bemisaal	
1995	Jawab	
1995	Surakshaa	
1995	Naajayaz	
1995	Hathkadi	
1995	Baazi	
1995	Takkar	
1995	Hulchul	
1995	Ahankaar	
1995	Gundaraj	
1995	Yaraana	
1995	Ram Shastra	
1995	Akele Hum Akele Tum	Nominated–Filmfare Award for Best Music Director
1995	Ram Jaane	
1995	Gambler	
1996	Beqabu	
1996	Suhagraat Se Pehle	
1996	Khiladiyon Ka Khiladi	
1996	Chaahat	
1996	Daraar	
1996	Krishna	
1996	Dushman Duniya Ka	
1996	Diljale	
1996	Zordaar	
1996	Ghatak	Only one song "Koi Jaaye To Le Aaye"
1996	Sapoot	
1996	Ram Aur Shyam	
1996	Namak	
1997	Judwaa	
1997	Auzaar	
1997	Tamanna	
1997	Himalay Putra	
1997	Dil Kitna Nadan Hai	
1997	Virasat	
1997	Border	Nominated–Filmfare Award for Best Music Director
1997	Hamesha	
1997	Mr. and Mrs. Khiladi	
1997	Ishq	
1997	Dhaal	
1997	Ankhon Mein Tum Ho	
1998	Miss 420	
1998	Duplicate	
1998	Gharwali Baharwali	
1998	Kareeb	
1998	Iski Topi Uske Sarr	
1998	Angaaray	
1998	Hero Hindustani	
1998	Prem Aggan	
1998	Soldier	Nominated–Filmfare Award for Best Music Director
1998	China Gate	
1998	Wajood	
1999	Hum Aapke Dil Mein Rehte Hain	
1999	Aarzoo	
1999	Jaanam Samjha Karo	
1999	Kartoos	
1999	Sooryavansham	
1999	Biwi No.1	Nominated–Filmfare Award for Best Music Director
1999	Haseena Maan Jaayegi	Nominated–Filmfare Award for Best Music Director
1999	Baadshah	
1999	Chehraa	Television film

==== 2000s ====
Year	Film	Notes
2000	Mela	
2000	Badal	
2000	Khauff	
2000	Hera Pheri	
2000	Gang	
2000	Jung	
2000	Hum To Mohabbat Karega	
2000	Josh	Nominated–Filmfare Award for Best Music Director
2000	Refugee	National Film Award for Best Music Direction; Filmfare Special Award; Nominated–Filmfare Award for Best Music Director
2000	Har Dil Jo Pyar Karega	
2000	Fiza	Nominated–Filmfare Award for Best Music Director
2000	Aaghaaz	
2000	Ghaath	
2000	Champion	
2001	Kuch Khatti Kuch Meethi	
2001	Chori Chori Chupke Chupke	
2001	Rahul	
2001	Mujhe Kucch Kehna Hai	Nominated–Filmfare Award for Best Music Director
2001	Aks	
2001	Yaadein	
2001	Lajja	
2001	Ajnabee	
2001	Asoka	
2002	Filhaal...	
2002	Ab Ke Baras	
2002	Hum Kisi Se Kum Nahin	
2002	Badhaai Ho Badhaai	
2002	Awara Paagal Deewana	
2002	Kuch Tum Kaho Kuch Hum Kahein	
2002	Om Jai Jagadish	
2002	Sabse Badhkar Hum	
2002	Chor Machaaye Shor	
2002	Shakti: The Power	Only one song "Ishq Kamina"
2003	Kucch To Hai	
2003	Khushi	
2003	Ishq Vishk	
2003	Main Prem Ki Diwani Hoon	
2003	Saaya	
2003	Mumbai Se Aaya Mera Dost	
2003	Inteha	
2003	Sssshhh...	
2003	Munnabhai MBBS	
2003	LOC: Kargil	Nominated–Filmfare Award for Best Music Director
2004	Paap	Only 2 songs "Intezar", "Sun E Mera Dil"
2004	Love in Nepal	Only one song "Mushkil Hai"
2004	Murder	Nominated–Filmfare Award for Best Music Director
2004	Krishna Cottage	
2004	Main Hoon Na	Filmfare Award for Best Music Director
2004	Aan: Men at Work	
2004	Garv	
2004	Love	Kannada film
2004	Mujhse Shaadi Karogi	One song "Jeene Ke Hain Chaar Din"
2004	Shart: The Challenge	
2004	Fida	
2004	Dobara	
2004	Bride & Prejudice	Hindi, Punjabi, English
2004	Ab Tumhare Hawale Watan Saathiyo	
2005	Elaan	
2005	Jurm	
2005	Chehraa	
2005	Tango Charlie	
2005	Zeher	
2005	Waqt	
2005	Kyaa Kool Hai Hum	
2005	Nazar	
2005	Bachke Rehna Re Baba	
2005	Fareb	
2005	No Entry	
2005	Shaadi No. 1	
2005	Deewane Huye Paagal	
2005	Kalyug	
2006	Pyare Mohan	
2006	Humko Deewana Kar Gaye	
2006	Aatma	
2006	Jai Santoshi Maa	
2006	Zindaggi Rocks	
2006	Jaan-E-Mann	
2006	Umrao Jaan	
2007	Undertrial	
2007	My Bollywood Bride	
2008	Anamika	
2008	Don Muthu Swami	
2008	Hastey Hastey - Follow Your Heart	
2008	Woodstock Villa	
2008	Love Story 2050	
2008	Mission Istaanbul	
2008	Ugly Aur Pagli	
2008	Good Luck!	
2008	Maan Gaye Mughal-e-Azam	
2009	Bad Luck Govind	
2009	Victory	
2009	Chal Chala Chal	
2009	Kambakkht Ishq	
2009	Teree Sang	Two song composed
2009	7 Days in Slow Motion	

==== 2010s ====
Year	Film	Notes
2010	Hisss	
2010	Toonpur Ka Superhero	
2011	Yamala Pagla Deewana	
2012	Gali Gali Chor Hai	
2012	Yeh Jo Mohabbat Hai	
2013	Shootout at Wadala	Three songs
2015	Dum Laga Ke Haisha	
2015	Welcome Back	Two songs
2017	Begum Jaan	
2017	Indu Sarkar	
2017	Judwaa 2	Two songs "Chalti Hai Kya" and "Unchi Hai Building" along with Sandeep Shirodkar
2017	Qarib Qarib Singlle	One song "Daana Pani"
2018	Paltan	
2018	Batti Gul Meter Chalu	One song- "Gold Tamba"
2018	Sui Dhaaga	

==== 2020s ====
Year	Film	Notes
2021	Sandeep Aur Pinky Faraar	One song – "Faraar"
2021	Hungama 2	
2024	The Sabarmati Report	
2024	Swatantrya Veer Savarkar	
2025	Zindagi Namkeen	
2025	Tu Meri Poori Kahani	
2026	Hai Jawani Toh Ishq Hona Hai †	"Hai Jawani Toh Ishq Hona Hai (Title Track)", "Chunnari Chunnari - Let's Go!"

=== As playback singer ===
Year	Film	Song	Composer(s)	Lyricist(s)	Co-singer(s)	Notes
1983	Nigahain	"Beete Huay Kuch Pal"	Sardar Malik	Sardar Malik		
1985	Mard	"Will You Marry Me"	Anu Malik	Prayag Raj	Asha Bhosle	
1985	Mard	"Sun Rubia Tumse Pyar Ho Gaya"	Anu Malik	Indeevar	Shabbir Kumar, S. Janaki, Sharon Prabhakar, Amitabh Bachchan	
1985	Apna Jahaan	"Tere Mere Sapne Sare Khoye Hain Kahan"	Anu Malik	Amit Khanna	Anuradha Paudwal	
1985	Apna Jahaan	"Yeh Duniya Yeh Duniya Dekho Durbin Hai"	Anu Malik	Amit Khanna		
1987	Dadagiri	"Jo Muskurahat Mujhe De Rahi Ho"	Anu Malik	Hasrat Jaipuri	Munmi Borah	
1988	Jeete Hain Shaan Se	"Julie Julie"	Anu Malik	Indeevar	Kavita Krishnamurthy	
1988	Jeete Hain Shaan Se	"Rab Roothe Roothe"	Anu Malik	Indeevar	Anuradha Paudwal, Shabbir Kumar	
1988	Jeete Hain Shaan Se	"Salaam Seth Salaam Seth"	Anu Malik	Shaily Shailendra		
1988	Aakhri Adaalat	"Aaj Nahin To Kal"	Anu Malik	Anjaan	Alisha Chinai	
1988	Aakhri Adaalat	"Jaisa Tu Karega"	Anu Malik	Anjaan	Mohammad Aziz	
1988	Maalamaal	"Maal Hai To Taal Hai" V1	Anu Malik	Indeevar	Kishore Kumar, Amit Kumar, Sudesh Bhosle	
1988	Maalamaal	"Maal Hai To Taal Hai" V2	Anu Malik	Indeevar	Kishore Kumar, Amit Kumar, Sudesh Bhosle	
1988	Maalamaal	"Meri Raaton Mein"	Anu Malik	Indeevar	Alisha Chinai	
1988	Maalamaal	"Pehla Pehla Pyar"	Anu Malik	Indeevar	Alisha Chinai	
1989	Meri Zabaan	"Dam Maara"	Anu Malik	Anjaan	Asha Bhosle	
1989	Meri Zabaan	"Yeh Bhi Mujhe Chahe"	Anu Malik	Anjaan	Alisha Chinai	
1989	Daana Paani	"Dhokha Dhokha"	Anu Malik	Hasrat Jaipuri	Padmini Kolhapure	
1989	Daana Paani	"Jiski Bitiya Badi Ho Gayi"	Anu Malik	Hasrat Jaipuri		
1990	Gunahon Ka Devta	"Aap Hi Se Dosti, Aap Hi Se Pyar"	Anu Malik	Indeevar	Sadhana Sargam	
1991	Shikari	"Koki Koki Koki"	Anu Malik	Anand Bakshi	Anuradha Paudwal	
1991	Maa	"Anjan Ki Seeti Mein"	Anu Malik	Ikram Rajasthani	Alka Yagnik	
1991	Naamcheen	"Lift Band Thi"	Anu Malik	Shaily Shailendra	Kavita Krishnamurthy	
1992	Tahalka	"Meri Chathri Ke Neeche Aaja"	Anu Malik	Hasrat Jaipuri	Mohammad Aziz, Sudesh Bhonsle	
1992	Tahalka	"Eya Eya O"	Anu Malik	Santosh Anand	Anuradha Paudwal	
1992	Tahalka	"Main Hoon Garam Dharam"	Anu Malik	Hasrat Jaipuri	Abhijeet	
1992	Dil Ne Ikraar Kiya	"Choone Se Tere"	Anu Malik	Anand Bakshi	Asha Bhosle	
1993	Phir Teri Kahani Yaad Aayee	"Aane Wala Kal Ek Sapna Hai"	Anu Malik	Qateel Shifai		
1993	Jaanam	"Maari Gayi"	Anu Malik	Qateel Shifai	Anuradha Paudwal	
1993	Baazigar	"Yeh Kaali Kaali Aankhen"	Anu Malik	Dev Kohli	Kumar Sanu	Malik sang the rap portion
1994	Madam X	"Kaise Dil Jeeten Aapka"	Anu Malik	Indeevar		
1994	Main Khiladi Tu Anari	"Main Khiladi Tu Anari"	Anu Malik	Maya Govind	Udit Narayan, Abhijeet	Malik sang the rap portion
1996	Ram Aur Shyam	"Bindu Re Bindu"	Anu Malik	Faaiz Anwar	Parveen Saba	
1997	Judwaa	"Oonchi Hai Building"	Anu Malik	Dev Kohli	Poornima	
1997	Judwaa	"East Or West India Is The Best"	Anu Malik	Anu Malik, Nitin Raikwar		
1997	Auzaar	"Dil Le Le Lena"	Anu Malik	Anu Malik	Abhijeet, Jo Jo, Anamika	
1997	Auzaar	"Hum Aur Tum Aur Yeh Sama"	Anu Malik	Rahat Indori	Alka Yagnik, Remo Fernandes	
1997	Mr. and Mrs. Khiladi	"Hum Total Fida Tum Peh"	Anu Malik	Dev Kohli	Anuradha Paudwal	
1997	Ishq	"Humko Tumse Pyaar Hai"	Anu Malik	Anu Malik	Abhijeet	
1998	Miss 420	"Aaja Meri Gaadi Mein Beth Ja"	Anu Malik	Anu Malik	Baba Sehgal	
1998	Miss 420	"Memsaab O Memsaab"	Anu Malik	Shaily Shailendra	Sheeba	
1998	Iski Topi Uske Sarr	"Punjabi Punjabi"	Anu Malik	Dev Kohli	Jaswinder	
1998	Iski Topi Uske Sarr	"Sabhi Ko Daulat Ka"	Anu Malik	Shyam Anuragi	Vinod Rathod	
1999	Jaanam Samjha Karo	"I Was Made For Loving You"	Anu Malik	Majrooh Sultanpuri	Kamal Khan, Ila Arun	
1999	Jaanam Samjha Karo	"Jaanam Samjha Karo"	Anu Malik	Majrooh Sultanpuri	Hema Sardesai	
2000	Badal	"Lal Garara"	Anu Malik	Sameer	Jaspinder Narula, Sapna Awasthi	
2000	Hum To Mohabbat Karega	"Churalo Dil"	Anu Malik	Majrooh Sultanpuri	Shraddha Pandit	
2000	Hum To Mohabbat Karega	"Dada Maanja Baba Maanja"	Anu Malik	Majrooh Sultanpuri	Alka Yagnik	
2000	Hum To Mohabbat Karega	"Hum To Mohabbat Karega"	Anu Malik	Majrooh Sultanpuri	Sunidhi Chauhan	
2000	Har Dil Jo Pyar Karega	"Ek Garam Chai Ki Pyali Ho"	Anu Malik	Sameer		
2000	Jung	"Aaila Re"	Anu Malik	Sameer	Alka Yagnik	
2000	Jung	"Kadi Te Aana"	Anu Malik	Sameer	Jaspinder Narula	
2000	Jung	"She Gives Me Fever"	Anu Malik	Dev Kohli		
2002	Awara Paagal Deewana	"More Sawariya"	Anu Malik	Sameer	Shaan, Sunidhi Chauhan	
2004	Main Hoon Na	"Gori Gori"	Anu Malik	Javed Akhtar	K.K., Sunidhi Chauhan, Shreya Ghoshal	
2005	Elaan	"Anderlu Menderlu"	Anu Malik	Sameer	Sonu Nigam, Sunidhi Chauhan, Shreya Ghoshal	
2005	Elaan	"Anderlu Menderlu" (Remix)	Anu Malik	Sameer	Sonu Nigam, Sunidhi Chauhan, Shreya Ghoshal	
2005	Waqt: The Race Against Time	"Do Me A Favour Let's Play Holi"	Anu Malik	Sameer	Sunidhi Chauhan	
2005	Kyaa Kool Hai Hum	"Kya Kool Hain Hum"	Anu Malik	Sameer	K.K., Kunal Ganjawala	
2005	Deewane Huye Pagal	"Maar Sutiye"	Anu Malik	Sameer		
2005	Deewane Huye Pagal	"Meri Jaane Jigar"	Anu Malik	Sameer		
2005	Deewane Huye Pagal	"Sutradhar - I"	Anu Malik	Sameer		
2005	Deewane Huye Pagal	"Chakle Chakle"	Anu Malik	Sameer		
2005	Deewane Huye Pagal	"Chakle Chakle" (Remix)	Anu Malik	Sameer		
2005	Deewane Huye Pagal	"Sutradhar - II"	Anu Malik	Sameer		
2006	Humko Deewana Kar Gaye	"Rockstar"	Anu Malik	Sameer	Abhijeet, Sunidhi Chauhan	
2008	Ugly Aur Pagli	"Shut Up, Aa Nachle"	Anu Malik	Amitabh Verma	Vasundhara Das, Dibyendu Mukherji	
2008	Don Muthu Swami	"Jhoom Le Jhoom Le"	Anu Malik	Amitabh Verma		
2009	Chal Chala Chal	"Naacho Don't Se Bas, Gaao Don't Se Bas"	Anu Malik	Vaibhav Modi	Shaan, Joi Barua	
2015	Hey Bro	"Line Laga"	Nitz 'N' Sony	Pranav Vatsa	Mika Singh	
2015	Welcome Back	"20-20"	Anu Malik	Manoj Muntashir, Shabbir Ahmed	Mamta Sharma, Shadaab	
2017	Coffee with D	"Coffee with D"	Superbia	Sameer Anjaan		
2021	Sandeep Aur Pinky Faraar	"Faraar"	Anu Malik	Anu Malik, Dibakar Banerjee		

== Non-film work ==
=== Albums ===
Year	Album	Song	Singers	Notes
1985	Jadoo	"Jadoo Part 1"	Alisha Chinai	Alisha Chinai's debut Indipop album
1985	Jadoo	"Khuda"	Alisha Chinai	Alisha Chinai's debut Indipop album
1985	Jadoo	"Mon Cheri"	Alisha Chinai, Anu Malik	Alisha Chinai's debut Indipop album
1985	Jadoo	"My Angel Blue"	Alisha Chinai	Alisha Chinai's debut Indipop album
1985	Jadoo	"Rootho Naa Humse"	Alisha Chinai	Alisha Chinai's debut Indipop album
1985	Jadoo	"Kabhi Na Raat Jaye"	Alisha Chinai, Anu Malik	Alisha Chinai's debut Indipop album
1985	Jadoo	"Tum Meri Zindagi Ho"	Alisha Chinai	Alisha Chinai's debut Indipop album
1985	Jadoo	"Jadoo Part 2"	Alisha Chinai	Alisha Chinai's debut Indipop album
1986	Ham Sabko Salaam Karte Hain	"Ham Aur Tum"	Krish Malik	Composed tracks with his brothers Abu Malik and Daboo Malik
1986	Ham Sabko Salaam Karte Hain	"Ham Sabko Salaam Karte Hain"	Anu Malik, Abu Malik, Krish Malik	Composed tracks with his brothers Abu Malik and Daboo Malik
1986	Ham Sabko Salaam Karte Hain	"Jane Jana"	Krish Malik	Composed tracks with his brothers Abu Malik and Daboo Malik
1986	Ham Sabko Salaam Karte Hain	"Kya Ada Hai"	Abu Malik	Composed tracks with his brothers Abu Malik and Daboo Malik
1986	Ham Sabko Salaam Karte Hain	"Mujhe Aaj Gale Se Lagale"	Anu Malik	Composed tracks with his brothers Abu Malik and Daboo Malik
1986	Ham Sabko Salaam Karte Hain	"Teri Yaad Sataye"	Abu Malik	Composed tracks with his brothers Abu Malik and Daboo Malik
1986	Ham Sabko Salaam Karte Hain	"Tu Bane Mera Dil"	Abu Malik	Composed tracks with his brothers Abu Malik and Daboo Malik
1986	Ham Sabko Salaam Karte Hain	"Tu Meri Jaan Hai"	Krish Malik	Composed tracks with his brothers Abu Malik and Daboo Malik
1994	Dilli Ki Billi	"Fire Circle"	Instrumental composed by Anu Malik	Lyrics by Amit Khanna
1994	Dilli Ki Billi	"Dilli Ki Billi"	Anu Malik, Ravi Khote	Lyrics by Amit Khanna
1994	Dilli Ki Billi	"Saat Suron Ki"	Abhijeet, Vivek Varma	Lyrics by Amit Khanna
1994	Dilli Ki Billi	"Sab That Dhaara Slow"	Vivek Varma	Lyrics by Amit Khanna
1994	Dilli Ki Billi	"Africano"	Ravi Khote	Lyrics by Amit Khanna
1994	Dilli Ki Billi	"Shor Ki Dhoop"	Abhijeet, Vivek Varma	Lyrics by Amit Khanna
1994	Dilli Ki Billi	"Sab That Dhaara Fast"	Abhijeet, Sadhana Sargam, Vivek Varma	Lyrics by Amit Khanna
1994	Dilli Ki Billi	"Dheere Dheere"	Abhijeet, Sadhana Sargam, Vivek Varma	Lyrics by Amit Khanna
1995	Tera Chehra	"Bashinda"	Anu Malik	First album where Anu Malik sung all songs; lyrics by Javed Akhtar
1995	Tera Chehra	"Honge Nahin Majboor"	Anu Malik	First album where Anu Malik sung all songs; lyrics by Javed Akhtar
1995	Tera Chehra	"Jaane Ke Liye Mat Aana"	Anu Malik	First album where Anu Malik sung all songs; lyrics by Javed Akhtar
1995	Tera Chehra	"Kyun Mehki Fiza"	Anu Malik	First album where Anu Malik sung all songs; lyrics by Javed Akhtar
1995	Tera Chehra	"Saanwli Si Ek Ladki"	Anu Malik	First album where Anu Malik sung all songs; lyrics by Javed Akhtar
1995	Tera Chehra	"Tera Chehra"	Anu Malik	First album where Anu Malik sung all songs; lyrics by Javed Akhtar
1995	Tera Chehra	"Tum Aao"	Anu Malik	First album where Anu Malik sung all songs; lyrics by Javed Akhtar
1996	Eyes	"My Heart Goes Boom"	Anu Malik	Only album with all songs in English
1996	Eyes	"I Have No Dollars"	Anu Malik	Only album with all songs in English
1996	Eyes	"Watch"	Anu Malik	Only album with all songs in English
1996	Eyes	"You Look To Me A Virgin"	Anu Malik	Only album with all songs in English
1996	Eyes	"Momma"	Anu Malik, Deepa Singh	Only album with all songs in English
1996	Eyes	"Eyes"	Anu Malik	Only album with all songs in English
1996	Eyes	"Last Dance (One More Dance)"	Anu Malik, Andrea Smith	Only album with all songs in English
1996	Eyes	"Passing By Your Street"	Anu Malik	Only album with all songs in English
1996	Eyes	"Forever"	Anu Malik	Only album with all songs in English
1996	Eyes	"I Have No Dollars" (Special Mix)	Anu Malik	Only album with all songs in English
1996	Eyes	"Watch" (Special Mix)	Anu Malik	Only album with all songs in English
1997	Lafda Na Ho Jaye	"I Yai Yo"	Anu Malik	Described as Anu Malik's "first pop album"
1997	Lafda Na Ho Jaye	"Jaana Nahin"	Anu Malik	Described as Anu Malik's "first pop album"
1997	Lafda Na Ho Jaye	"Baarish"	Anu Malik	Described as Anu Malik's "first pop album"
1997	Lafda Na Ho Jaye	"Tu Mile Na Mile"	Anu Malik	Described as Anu Malik's "first pop album"
1997	Lafda Na Ho Jaye	"Dil Churake"	Anu Malik	Described as Anu Malik's "first pop album"
1997	Lafda Na Ho Jaye	"Shililili"	Anu Malik	Described as Anu Malik's "first pop album"
1997	Lafda Na Ho Jaye	"Tu Jo Kahe"	Anu Malik	Described as Anu Malik's "first pop album"
1997	Lafda Na Ho Jaye	"Lafda Na Ho Jaye"	Anu Malik	Described as Anu Malik's "first pop album"
1997	Lafda Na Ho Jaye	"Tu Mile Na Mile" (Remix)	Anu Malik	Described as Anu Malik's "first pop album"
1999	Ho Raha Hai Sama	"Dhuan Dhuan"	Anu Malik	Lyrics mostly written by Majrooh Sultanpuri with few by Anu Malik
1999	Ho Raha Hai Sama	"Pagal Pagal"	Anu Malik	Lyrics mostly written by Majrooh Sultanpuri with few by Anu Malik
1999	Ho Raha Hai Sama	"Le Kasam"	Anu Malik	Lyrics mostly written by Majrooh Sultanpuri with few by Anu Malik
1999	Ho Raha Hai Sama	"Sun Sign"	Anu Malik	Lyrics mostly written by Majrooh Sultanpuri with few by Anu Malik
1999	Ho Raha Hai Sama	"Tum Jo Aate Nahin"	Anu Malik	Lyrics mostly written by Majrooh Sultanpuri with few by Anu Malik
1999	Ho Raha Hai Sama	"Bindiya"	Anu Malik	Lyrics mostly written by Majrooh Sultanpuri with few by Anu Malik
1999	Ho Raha Hai Sama	"O My God" (Ho Raha Hai Sama	Anu Malik	Lyrics mostly written by Majrooh Sultanpuri with few by Anu Malik
1999	Ho Raha Hai Sama	"Dil Mein Aake Jaana Na"	Anu Malik	Lyrics mostly written by Majrooh Sultanpuri with few by Anu Malik

=== Singles ===
Year	Film	Notes
1997	Kasam Li Hai	From the collaborative album A Reason To Smile featuring various songs by different singers and music directors
2015	Lamhein	Sung by Anmol Malik
2018	Tum Hi Toh Ho	Sung by Anmol Malik
2019	Monday	
2020	Happy Happy Rehne Ka Please Don’t Worry	
