= Arun Bakshi =

Indian film and television actor

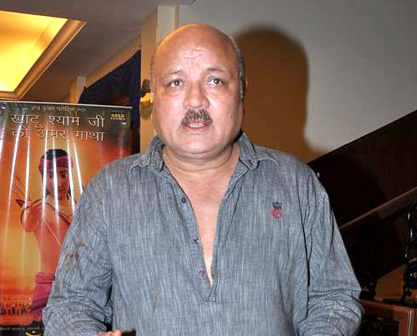
- Born: Ludhiana, Punjab, India
- Occupation: Actor
- Years active: 1981–present
- Spouse: Babli Bakshi
- Children: Paras Bakshi (son); Ambika Bakshi (daughter)
- Parents: I.N. Bakshi (father); Ved Bakshi (mother)

Arun Bakshi is an Indian film and television actor and also a singer. He has acted as a character actor in over 100 Hindi films, and as a playback singer has also sung 298 songs. He has also worked in Punjabi and Bhojpuri cinema. He also played the role of Mahant Dashrath Tripathi in Colors TV's Ishq Ka Rang Safed.

Bakshi is well known for his performances in B. R. Chopra's Mahabharat as Dhristadyumna, Guru, Kuch To Gadbad Hai and Masoom.

== Early life ==
He was born and brought up in Ludhiana, Punjab, where he graduated from Arya College, Ludhiana. He worked with the Punjab Agricultural University for a while, before moving to Mumbai, to start his acting career in 1981, first in television and later films.

== Filmography ==
Year	Film	Role	Other notes
1981	Chakra	Police Inspector	
1981	Sazaye Maut		
1982	Nikaah	Wedding Guest (uncredited)	
1983	Qayamat	Police Inspector	
1983	Mazdoor	Mill worker	
1983	Zara Si Zindagi	Arun	
1984	Saaransh	Gajanan Chitre's Goon	
1984	Aaj Ki Awaz	Inspector Veerkar	
1984	Gangvaa	Groom at Marriage	
1984	Kanoon Kya Karega	Defence Lawyer	
1985	Surkhiyaan	Night Queen Guest House's Manager	
1985	Nasoor	Dr. Babubhai	
1985	Tawaif	Zafar	
1986	Begaana	Vijaya Bank Branch Manager	
1986	Duty		
1987	Awam (film)	Air Chief Marshal Vasudevan	
1988	Tamacha	Advocate Mulchandani (uncredited)	
1989	Daata	Jailor Sharma	
1989	Guru	Inspector Arun	
1989	Ilaaka	Baban	
1989	Elaan-E-Jung	Indian Soldier	
1989	Main Azaad Hoon	Protester	
1989	Ghar Ka Chiraag	Murli Kaka	
1990	Baaghi: A Rebel for Love	Mahesh	
1990	Swarg	Director	
1991	Fateh	Tau	
1991	Vishnu-Devaa	Ram Prasad	
1991	Patthar Ke Phool	Police Commissioner	
1991	Numbri Aadmi	Police Inspector Anand Srivastav	
1991	Henna	Pakistan Police Constable Nawabbudin	
1991	Trinetra		
1991	Ranbhoomi	Hotel Owner	
1992	Anaam	Dr. Harry Thomas	
1992	Apradhi	Police Inspector	
1992	Balwaan	Police Inspector Tanya Palok	
1992	Chamatkar	Cricket Umpire	
1992	Bol Radha Bol	Banarasi Chacha	
1992	Paayal	Paayal's Father	
1992	Dil Ka Kya Kasoor	Verma, Editor (as Arun Bhakshi)	
1993	Shatranj	Arun	
1993	Parwane	Ex-Police Inspector (as Aroon Bakshi)	
1993	15th August	Corrupt Police Inspector Kaansingh Devdaa	
1993	Police Wala	Drunk in train	
1993	Rang	Lecturer	
1993	Waqt Hamara Hai	Munim (Sunil's Uncle)	
1993	Platform	Batli – Beggar with Harmonium	
1993	Roop Ki Rani Choron Ka Raja	Mr. Katik Lal	
1993	Game	Vikram's dad	
1993	Antim Nyay	Arjun Baksh	
1993	Ek Hi Raasta	Major Rathore	
1993	Phir Teri Kahani Yaad Aayee	Singer in song "Dil Ro Ro Ke"	
1993	Aankhen	Fisherman (Uncredited)	
1994	Zaalim	Dr. Vikram	
1994	Jai Kishen	Police Inspector	
1994	Laadla	Mehtu, Mill Worker	
1994	Raja Babu	Chandra Mohan (uncredited)	
1994	Gopi Kishan	Corrupt Minister Rautullah Himayati	
1994	Dhuan Hi Dhuan		
1994	Khudai	Jagjit	
1994	Eena Meena Deeka	Batli – Beggar with Harmonium	
1994	Hum Hain Bemisaal	Bakshi	
1995	Gande Log		
1995	God and Gun		
1995	Surakshaa	Laxman Singh	
1995	Imtihaan		
1996	Diljale	Laaley	
1996	Mafia	John T. Dalla	
1996	Saajan Chale Sasural	Madhav	
1996	Vijeta	Trade Union Leader (uncredited)	
1996	Hind Ki Beti		
1996	Masoom		
1996	Himmatvar	(as Arun Baxi)	
1996	Rakshak	Advocate	
1996	Bhishma	Inspector Jagawar	
1996	Army	Police Inspector Bakshi (as Aroon Bakshi)	
1997	Krishna Arjun	Inspector Chatursen Chaubey	
1997	Ghoonghat	Boghi	
1997	Auzaar	Arun Bhai	
1997	Yeshwant	Psychiatrist	
1997	Itihaas	(as Aroon Bakshi)	
1997	Sanam	Constable (questing Khan about his vehicle)	
1998	Pardesi Babu	Thief	
1998	Iski Topi Uske Sarr	Mohamed	
1998	Miss 420	Vakar – Khan's assistant	
1998	Devta		
1998	Hitler	Inspector Bakshi	
1998	Hafta Vasuli	(as Aroon Bakshi)	
1999	Heera Lal Panna Lal	Pandit (in song "Aaya Sherawali")	
1999	Zulmi	Polish Inspector Vikram	
1999	Sarfarosh-E-Hind	Crippled soldier	
1999	Dulhan Banoo Main Teri	Rastogi	
1999	Kaala Samrajya	as Aroon Bakshi	
1999	Shaheed-e-Mohabbat Boota Singh		Punjabi cinema film
1999	Dil Kya Kare		
2000	Baaghi		
2000	Justice Chowdhary		
2001	Ittefaq	ACP Anand Verma	
2001	Dial 100	Police Commissioner Dharmesh Deo	
2002	Yeh Dil Aashiqanaa	Mr. Patkar	
2002	Mulaqaat	Mr. Patkar	
2002	Sindoor Ki Saugandh	Gulal	
2002	Kranti	Pachpute, Labour Minister	
2002	Vadh		
2002	Rishtey	(as Aroon Bakshi)	
2002	Karz: The Burden of Truth	Cheema	
2003	Where's the Party Yaar?	Dr. Bakshi	
2003	Aanch	Shambhu	
2004	Kuch To Gadbad Hai	Inspector R.K. Marwah	
2004	Aaj Jaana Hai Ke Pyaar Kya Ha		
2004	Mission Mumbai		
2004	Ab... Bas!	Baba	
2005	Jo Bole So Nihaal	Rajinder Singh	
2005	Kyon Ki...		
2006	Come December	Mr. Sharma	
2006	Ek Jind Ek Jaan	Dhanwant 'Dhanya' Dhanoo' Singh/Dhanwant Kang	Punjabi cinema film
2007	Salaam-E-Ishq	Satpal	
2007	Khanna & Iyer	Minister Bhanupratap	
2007	Sirf Romance: Love by Chance	Jarnail Singh	
2007	My Friend Ganesha		
2008	Black & White	Naeem Shaikh	
2008	Don Muthu Swami	Inspector Bakshi	
2008	EMI: Liya Hai To Chukana Padega	Manager – All India Bank	
2008	Desh Drohi	Sanjay's P.A.	
2008	Wattanaan Ton Door	Pilot Daler Singh	
2009	Victory	Chander	
2009	Dekh Bhai Dekh: Laughter Behind Darkness	Police Inspector	
2010	Ashok Chakra: Tribute to Real Heroes	Maulana Asad Masood (as Aroon Bakshi)	
2011	The Life Zindagi	Kamal Kumar	
2012	It's Rocking: Dard-E-Disco	Mr. Bakshi	
2013	Awwal Gulookaar	Judge	Reality Singing Show
2017	9 O'Clock	Nasim	
2018	Dulhan Chahi Pakistan Se 2		Bhojpuri Movie
2018	Mausam Ikrar Ke Do Pal Pyar Ke		
2019	Chan Tara	Kanjoos Baap	Punjabi Movie
2022	Anth The End		Hindi Movie
2022	48 Kos	Sham Lal	Hindi Movie
2023	Fire of Love: Red		Hindi Movie

== Music ==
2011 Tum Hi To Ho... (playback singer)

2010 Ashok Chakra: Tribute to Real Heroes (playback singer – as Aroon Bakshi)

2002 Aankhen (playback singer)

2000 [Dalaal No.1] (playback singer)

1998 Chhota Chetan (playback singer – as Aroon Bakshi)

1998 Hafta Vasuli (playback singer – as Aroon Bakshi)

1995 Janam Kundli (playback singer)

1995 God and Gun (playback singer)

1994 Amaanat (playback singer)

1994 Prem Yog (playback singer)

1994 Gopi Kishan (playback singer)

1994 Jai Kishen (playback singer)

1993 Parwane (playback singer – as Aroon Bakshi)

1993 Platform (playback singer)

1993 Aankhen (playback singer)

1992 Adharm (playback singer)

1992 pyar dewana hota hai (playback singer)

1992 Balwaan (playback singer)

== Composer ==
2010 Ashok Chakra: Tribute to Real Heroes (music / as Aroon Bakshi)
