= Raj Bharath =

Raj Bharath may refer to:

- Raj Bharath (racing driver)
- Raj Bharath (actor)

== See also ==
- Raj Bharat, Indian film director
