= Palay Khan =

Mujahideen leader (1888–1951)

Palay Khan پالې خان
- Born: 1888; Zhob, British Balochistan, British India
- Died: 1951 (aged 62–63); Zhob Balochistan (Chief Commissioner's Province) Pakistan
- Known for: Leader of prominent freedom fighters (Mujahideen) during British rule

Palay Khan (Pashto: پالې خان, 1888-1951), also referred to as Palay Shah, was an ethnic Pashtun from the Khosti tribe in zhob, a freedom fighter, and commander of the group that fought against the British Raj in 1930 in Baluchistan (a Commissionerate Province). Khosti was living in Zhob when he died on January 1, 1951. Palay Khan never accepted an agreement between his group and the British Raj, against some compensation in favor of the earlier. The British promised him that they would agree to the Tribal Laws as the Constitution and Laws for his land.

== Depictions ==
=== Film and television ===
The 1986 Bollywood film Palay Khan, directed by Ashim Samanta and produced by Shakti Samanta, provides a romanticized depiction of Palay Khan's campaign against the British. Palay was played by Jackie Shroff.

The 1990 PTV drama series Palay Shah was produced as a tribute to his involvement in the freedom movement. The series had 13 episodes, and 75% of the drama was shot on-location in Balochistan.. Palay was played by Jamal Shah (whom also wrote the script for the series).

=== Novels ===
A novel has been written on the life of Palay Khan (1978) in Hindi by Gulshan Nanda.
