= Red Salute =

Red Salute is the title of the following films:

- Red Salute (1935 film), an American film directed by Sidney Lanfield
- Red Salute (2006 film), an Indian Malayalam-language film

== See also ==
- Lal Salam (disambiguation), translated from several languages as "Red Salute"
