= Main Awara Hoon =

- Promotional poster
- Directed by: Ashim S. Samanta
- Produced by: Shakti Samanta
- Starring: Raj Babbar; Sanjay Dutt; Jaya Prada; Rati Agnihotri
- Music by: R. D. Burman
- Release date: 9 December 1983
- Country: India
- Language: Hindi

Main Awara Hoon (transl. I am Wayward) is a 1983 Indian drama film directed by Ashim S. Samanta. The movie, based on a story by late Gulshan Nanda, with the music by R.D. Burman for the film. It stars Raj Babbar, Sanjay Dutt, Jaya Prada and Rati Agnihotri.

== Cast ==
- Raj Babbar as Rajeev Kumar
- Sanjay Dutt as Sanjeev Kumar "Sanju"
- Jaya Prada as Bela
- Rati Agnihotri as Archana Prasad
- Shakti Kapoor as Kundan
- Madan Puri as Chandulal
- Satyen Kappu as Dinanath Kumar
- Iftekhar as Dr. Raashid
- Shoma Anand as Shabana Rashid
- Rajendra Nath as Sardar Trilochan
- Shubha Khote as Kalawanti
- Dinesh Hingoo as Tahir Khan / Sahir Khan
- Manorama (Hindi actress) as Ruby
- Asit Sen as Sen

== Soundtrack ==
Lyrics: Anand Bakshi

Song	Singer
"Main Awara Hoon"	Kishore Kumar
"Kisi Ki Bewafai Ka Sabab"	Kishore Kumar
"Bolo Ji, Kaisi Kahi, Wah Ji Wah, Achchhi Kahi"	Kishore Kumar, Alka Yagnik
"Pyar Kise Kehte Hai, Pyar Ise Kehte Hai"	Kishore Kumar, Asha Bhosle
"Yahi To Mohabbat Hai"	Asha Bhosle
