= Hadh: Life on the Edge of Death =

2001 film by Thampi Kannanthanam

- Poster
- Directed by: Thampi Kannanthanam
- Written by: Shyam Soni
- Produced by: Sandeep D. Shinde
- Starring: Jackie Shroff; Sharad Kapoor; Ayesha Jhulka; Suman Ranganathan
- Cinematography: Dilip Dutta
- Edited by: Arun-Shekhar
- Music by: Viju Shah (songs), Sanjeev Kohli (BGM)
- Production company: Megha Arts
- Release date: 2 March 2001 (India)
- Country: India
- Language: Hindi

Hadh: Life on the Edge of Death (transl. : Limit or Boundary) is a 2001 Indian Hindi-language action film directed by Thampi Kannanthanam (in his only Bollywood debut) and produced by Sandeep D. Shinde. It stars Jackie Shroff, Sharad Kapoor, Ayesha Jhulka and Suman Ranganathan in pivotal roles.

== Plot ==
Vishwa was abandoned by his mother when he was a baby and was cruelly nicknamed "Harami." A kind man named Hajibaba takes him in, raises him, and gives him a new name, Vishwa. Hajibaba also cares for other orphaned children, including Dalal, Dalal's younger brother Chotey, and Shiva.

As they grow up, the children become close friends. However, Dalal and Chotey become jealous because Hajibaba clearly treats Vishwa as his favorite. Driven by jealousy, Dalal murders Hajibaba and falsely blames Vishwa for the crime. Vishwa is arrested, convicted, and sent to prison for five years.

After serving his sentence, Vishwa returns filled with anger and a desire for revenge. Determined to punish those responsible for ruining his life, he becomes willing to do whatever it takes to get revenge, even if it means hurting the people closest to him, including his wife Shiva and their child.

== Cast ==
- Jackie Shroff as Vishwa
- Sharad Kapoor as Shiva
- Ayesha Jhulka
- Suman Ranganathan
- Tej Sapru as Chotey
- Vikram Gokhale as Commissioner Shastri
- Kiran Kumar as Dalal

== Soundtrack ==
| # | Title | Singer(s) |
|---|---|---|
| 1 | "Hing La La" | Udit Narayan, Poonam Bhatia |
| 2 | "Aangoori Badan" | Suresh Raheja, Sapna Awasthi |
| 3 | "Kya Hoti Hai" | Kumar Sanu, Alka Yagnik |
| 4 | "Tere Dil Ne" | Manhar Udhas, Alka Yagnik |
| 5 | "Dekhi Dekhi Hai Kamaal Ki" | Sukhwinder Singh, Jackie Shroff, Sharad Kapoor |
