= Sharad Kapoor =

Indian actor (born 1976)

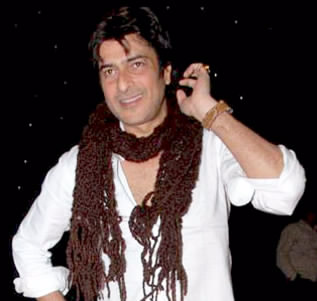
- Kapoor in 2010
- Born: 13 February 1976 (age 50); Kolkata, West Bengal, India
- Occupations: Actor, assistant director
- Years active: 1994–present
- Website: www.sharadskapoor.com

Sharad Kapoor (born 13 February 1976) is an Indian actor, who works in Hindi and Bengali movies and television. Having debuted in Mera Pyara Bharat in 1994, Kapoor has acted in many films throughout his career, including Jai Ho, Tamanna, Lakshya, and Josh. He also worked as an assistant director on the movie Lakshmanrekha.

== Early life and education ==
He was born and brought up in Kolkata, West Bengal into a Punjabi family with roots in Peshawar (modern-day Khyber Pakhtunkhwa, Pakistan), to a father who was an architect. While in school and college days, he took part in theatre and competed in sports such as cricket, snooker and swimming, being educated at the St. Xavier's College.

== Controversies ==
=== Allegations of sexual harassment ===
On 30 November 2024, it was reported that Kapoor faced accusations of misbehaving and sexual harassment and a case was registered by Mumbai Police and he was summoned for questioning.

In an interview, Kapoor dismissed the allegations, stating, "I am unaware of any case filed against me. I just returned from New York, and while the police have contacted me, I am in Kolkata. The incident did not happen, and I cannot implicate anyone falsely."

== Filmography ==
=== Television series ===
Year	Title	Role	Language
1995	Swabhimaan	Grover	Hindi
1995	Aankhen		Hindi
1996	Chahat aur Nafrat	Vishal Saxena	Hindi

=== Films ===
Year	Title	Role	Language	Notes
1994	Mera Pyara Bharat		Hindi	
1995	Hum Bhi		Hindi	
1996	Dastak	Sharad Sule	Hindi	
1997	Vishwavidhaata	Jai Verma/Ravi Khanna	Hindi	
1997	Tamanna	Sajid Khan	Hindi	
1997	Ankhon Mein Tum Ho	Pratap/Ranjit	Hindi	
1997	Achena Atithi	Pratap/Ranjit	Bengali	
1998	Iski Topi Uske Sarr	Jai Malhotra	Hindi	
1999	Sar Ankhon Par	Sharad Kapoor	Hindi	
1999	Trishakti	Mahesh (Munna)	Hindi	
1999	Kahani Kismat Ki	Advocate Prabhu Asish Kapoor	Hindi	
1999	Bhagya Bidhata	Advocate Prabhu Asish Kapoor	Bengali	
2000	Aaghaaz	Laxman (Pushpa's brother)	Hindi	
2000	Josh	Prakash Sharma	Hindi	
2000	Khauff	Inspector Arjun (Ritu's fiancé)	Hindi	
2000	Radheshyam Seetaram		Hindi	
2001	Kyo Kii... Main Jhuth Nahin Bolta	Adarsh	Hindi	
2001	Censor		Hindi	
2001	Hadh	Shiva	Hindi	
2002	Hathyar	Pakya	Hindi	
2002	Yeh Kaisi Mohabbat	Rahul Thakral	Hindi	
2002	Jaani Dushman: Ek Anokhi Kahani	Victor	Hindi	
2002	Yeh Hai Jalwa	Vikram	Hindi	
2002	Kuch Tum Kaho Kuch Hum Kahein	Rudra Pratap Singh	Hindi	
2002	Lal Salaam	Dr. Khanna	Hindi	
2003	LOC Kargil	Major Vijay Bhaskar	Hindi	
2003	Patth	Avinash	Hindi	
2003	Tada	Uday Rana	Hindi	
2003	Kash Aap Hamare Hote	Randeep Raj Mankotia	Hindi	
2003	Zinda Dil	Arjun	Hindi	
2004	Lakshya	Major Binod Sengupta	Hindi	
2004	Chot - aaj isko kal tereko	Inspector Laal	Hindi	
2004	Plan		Hindi	
2004	Kalo Chita	Pradip Gurung	Bengali	
2005	Ek Khiladi Ek Haseena	CBI Inspector Sardeshai/Inspector Vijay Kapoor	Hindi	
2005	Sauda – The Deal		Hindi	
2005	Chaahat – Ek Nasha	Jaidev	Hindi	
2005	Parinam	Raghu/ Raghabendra	Bengali	
2005	Swami Chintai	Raja	Bengali	
2006	Panchhi		Hindi	
2007	Dahek	Vikram Luthra	Hindi	
2010	Wanted	CBI Inspector Salim Khan	Bengali	
2010	Kolkata the metro life		Bengali	
2014	Hook Ya Crook		Hindi	
2014	Jai Ho	Inspector Siddiqui	Hindi	
2019	Jabariya Jodi	Daddan Yadav	Hindi	
2019	Cabaret	Vikram Batwal (Ex-IB Officer)	Hindi	Released on ZEE5
2022	No Means No	Shekar Oberoi	Hindi	
2022	The Good Maharaja			

== Awards and nominations ==
- 2001:Nominated: Filmfare Best Villain Award for Josh
