= Begaana (1986 film) =

1986 film directed by Ambrish Sangal

- Directed by: Ambrish Sangal
- Produced by: S. S. Shivdasani
- Starring: Kumar Gaurav; Rati Agnihotri; Deepti Naval; Raj Kiran; Dharmendra (special appearance)
- Music by: Anu Malik
- Release date: 18 July 1986 (India)
- Country: India
- Language: Hindi

Begaana is a 1986 Bollywood drama movie directed by Ambrish Sangal and produced by S. S. Shivdasani.

== Plot ==
Anand Mathur lives a middle-class lifestyle along with his sister, Asha, and retired Magistrate and widower father in Bombay's suburbs and studies in Mithibai College of Arts. He wins the college's annual singing competition, angering his nearest rival, Rama Kumar. He subsequently learns that Asha is in love with Rama's brother, Vinod, and arranges their marriage. After the marriage, he discovers that Vinod, Rama and their aunt, Leela, had expected a huge dowry, and on receiving none are now pressuring Asha to get some money and a fridge. Anand arranges for money and gets them a fridge. Vinod and his family then start to create misunderstandings between Asha and Anand albeit in vain. Vinod becomes more and more greedy and possessive about Asha and refuses to permit her to see her father and brother. When Anand's father passes away, Vinod manages to get a motorcycle from Anand but continues to create a barrier between brother and sister, so much so that Asha is convinced that Anand is up to no good. Then one day they learn that Anand has embezzled money from his employer, Vijaya Bank, Santa Cruz Branch. Subsequently, they learn that while absconding, Anand died in an accident. Quite unknown to them Anand is still alive and with the help of wealthy smuggler, Kailashnath Rana, whose life he saved, is now masquerading as Rana himself, has befriended and seduced Rama, married her and is all set to avenge his humiliation at Vinod's hands. Before he could complete his vendetta, he is abducted by Kailashnath's arch-enemy, A.P. Lall, and held until Kailashnath himself comes to negotiate his release.

== Cast ==
- Kumar Gaurav as Anand Mathur / Kailashnath Rana
- Rati Agnihotri as Rama Kumar / Rama K. Rana
- Raj Kiran as Vinod Kumar
- Deepti Naval as Asha Mathur / Asha V. Kumar
- Dharmendra as Kailashnath Rana (special appearance)
- Amrish Puri as A.P. Lall
- Manmohan Krishna as Mr. Mathur
- Arun Bakshi as Vijaya Bank Branch Manager
- Mohan Choti as Ramanna
- Aruna Irani as Leela
- Mac Mohan as Lall's assistant
- Om Shivpuri as Police Commissioner
- Sudhir as Danny
- Kalpana Iyer as Dancer in club
- Leena Das as Dancer in club
- Arjun Thapar as Dancer boy in club

== Soundtrack ==
All lyrics were by Anjaan.

#	Title	Singer(s)
1	"Apno Me Mai Begana"	Kishore Kumar
2	"Apno Me Mai Begana" 2	Kishore Kumar
3	"Jigar Thaam Lo Ki Mai Aa Gaya Hu"	Kishore Kumar
4	"Dear Sir Aap Ko Mai Bhut Chahti Hu"	Kishore Kumar, Asha Bhosle
5	"O Dil Jaani Rab Di Mehrbani"	Asha Bhosle
6	"Waqt Ke Saath"	Mohammed Aziz, Asha Bhosle
