= Aziz Sejawal =

Indian film director

- Born: India
- Occupation: Film director
- Years active: 1989 – present

Aziz Sejawal (also spelt Sajawal or Sajaawal) is an Indian film director of Bollywood films. He has worked with major Bollywood actors such as Dharmendra, Mithun Chakraborty, Madhuri Dixit, Amrish Puri, Om Puri, Aditya Pancholi, Jackie Shroff, Juhi Chawla, Sanjay Dutt, Govinda and Rani Mukerji. Most of his films have comedic elements, though they often address themes of injustice and corruption.

== Filmography ==
- Ilaaka (1989)
- Baap Numbri Beta Dus Numbri (1990)
- Adharm (1992)
- Shatranj (1993)
- Andolan (1995)
- Mafia (1996)
- Sanam (1997)
- Hero Hindustani (1998)
- Chhupa Rustam: A Musical Thriller (2001)
- Chalo Ishq Ladaaye (2002)
