= Anwar Sagar =

Indian Hindustani poet and lyricist (1949–2020)

- Born: Anwar Sagar; 30 August 1949; British India
- Died: 3 June 2020 (aged 70); Bombay, Maharashtra, India
- Occupations: Poet, Lyricist
- Years active: 1982–2002

Anwar Sagar (30 August 1949 – 3 June 2020) was an Indian Hindustani poet and lyricist. He penned hundreds of songs in Bollywood films and churned put numerous hit songs such as "Waada Raha Sanam", "Yeh Dua Hai Mere Rab Se", "Dil Ka Kya Kasoor", "Mera Piya Ghar Aaya", "Rahon Mein Unse" etc. He has written 225 songs in 86 Hindi films. His is most remembered for songs in Khiladi (1992), Baazigar (1993), Main Khiladi Tu Anari (1994), Yaarana (1995) etc.

== Career ==
Anwar got his first break in the film Zakhmi Rooh (1982). Initially, he had to struggle for more than a decade to finally set an identity with the success of the song "Waada Raha Sanam", sung by Alka Yagnik and Abhijeet Bhattacharya in the film Khiladi (1992). After this success, he penned several hit tracks in the films Dil Ka Kya Kasoor (1992), Sapne Sajan Ke (1992), Vijaypath (1994), Yaarana (1995), Kitne Door Kitne Paas (2002), the latter was his last work in Bollywood.

== Death ==
He died at Kokilaben Dhirubhai Ambani Hospital, Mumbai at the age of 70.

== Awards and nominations ==
Year	Category	Song/nomination	Result
Filmfare Awards
			Nominated

== Filmography ==
- Maine Jeena Seekh Liya (1982)
- Naya Safar (1982)
- Qatil Aur Ashiq (1986)
- Khooni Mahal (1987)
- Mera Lahoo (1987)
- Zulm Ko Jala Doonga (1988)
- Hisaab Khoon Ka (1989)
- Ilaaka (1989)
- Lashkar (1989)
- Apmaan Ki Aag (1990)
- Hukum (1990)
- Kishen Kanhaiya (1990)
- Love and War (1990)
- Pyaar Ka Toofan (1990)
- Jeevan Daata (1991)
- Khatra (1991)
- Laal Paree (1991)
- Shiv Ram (1991)
- Yeh Hai Ghar Ghar Ki Mahabharat (1991)
- Balwaan (1992)
- Bekhudi (1992)
- Dil Ka Kya Kasoor (1992)
- Dushman Zamana (1992)
- Khiladi (1992)
- Lambu Dada (1992)
- Meri Janeman (1992)
- Sapne Sajan Ke (1992)
- Zulm Ki Hukumat (1992)
- Aadmi (1993)
- Deewana Dil (1993)
- Phool Aur Angaar (1993)
- Pyar Pyar (1993)
- Zakhmo Ka Hisaab (1993)
- Aa Gale Lag Jaa (1994)
- Aag Aur Chingari (1994)
- Aashiq (1994)
- Amaanat (1994)
- Cheetah (1994)
- Janta Ki Adalat (1994)
- Juaari (1994)
- Laqshya (1994)
- Main Khiladi Tu Anari (1994)
- Salaami (1994)
- Vijaypath (1994)
- Aatank Hi Aatank (1995)
- Baazi (1995)
- Barsaat (1995)
- Gambler (1995)
- Gunda Mawali (1995)
- Nazar Ke Samne (1995)
- Paandav (1995)
- Saajan Ke Liye (1995)
- Sanjay (1995)
- Sauda (1995)
- The Don (1995)
- Yaarana (1995)
- Zakhmi Sipahi (1995)
- Agnee Prem (1996)
- Apne Dam Par (1996)
- Durjan (1996)
- Himmatvar (1996)
- Krishna (1996)
- Gundagardi (1997)
- Judge Mujrim (1997)
- Nirnayak (1997)
- Deewana Hoon Pagal Nahi (1998)
- Devta (1998)
- Love Story 98 (1998)
- Benaam (1999)
- Ganga Ki Kasam (1999)
- Sar Ankhon Par (1999)
- Aaj Ka Nanha Farishta (2000)
- Jwalamukhi (2000)
- Ehsaas (2001)
- Yeh Zindagi Ka Safar (2001)
- Kitne Door Kitne Paas (2002)
- Qaidi (2002)
- Basti (2003)
- Choron Ka Chor (2003)
- Girlfriend (2005)
- Gehri Chaal (2005)
- Mastani (2005)
- Qatl-E-Aam (2005)
- Meri Taaqat (2007)
- Kisse Pyaar Karoon (2009)
- Ek Hi Rasta — The Power (2010)
