= Chalo Ishq Ladaaye =

- DVD cover
- Directed by: Aziz Sejawal
- Written by: Ikram Akhtar; Imtiaz Patel; Yunus Sajawal
- Produced by: Vijay Mehta
- Starring: Govinda; Rani Mukerji
- Music by: Himesh Reshammiya
- Production company: Prathima Films
- Distributed by: Goldmines Telefilms
- Release date: 27 December 2002
- Running time: 141 minutes
- Language: Hindi
- Budget: ₹40 million
- Box office: ₹17 million

Chalo Ishq Ladaaye (transl. Come, Let's Fall In Love) is a 2002 Indian comedy film directed by Aziz Sejawal, starring Govinda, Rani Mukerji, Zohra Sehgal and Kader Khan. The film's title is inspired from the titular song in Govinda's earlier film Bade Miyan Chote Miyan (1998) and also marks the 2nd collaboration of Rani Mukherjee and the former after Hadh Kar Di Aapne.

== Plot ==
Popular but lonely Bollywood actress Sapna lives a fairly isolated life, though publicly she is thronged by fans, and has taken to drinking to ease her loneliness. Intoxicated, she runs her vehicle into a young man named Pappu, who suffers minor injuries. He recognizes her and tells her that he is her number-one fan and will do anything for her. She wants him to kill her double-timing boyfriend, Rahul (Sanjay Suri). He agrees to do so, provided she kills his overbearing grandmother, to which she agrees.

After Pappu completes his gruesome task, he meets with Sapna, only to be told that she does not recognize him, but when presented with proof, she relents and agrees to fulfill her part of this trade. She, along with Kokibhai, arrives at the palatial home of Pappu's grandmother and sets out to kill her.

ACP Kamat already has evidence linking Pappu to Rahul's sudden death and has been keeping a close eye on his whereabouts. Pappu finds out about his grandmother's will, stating that after her death Pappu would get all her property. Pappu asks for forgiveness.

Meanwhile, Sapna finds out that Pappu has not killed Rahul. Sapna finds out Pappu is with the police. A blackmailer tells Sapna to bring 5 crores. ACP Kamat tells his brothers about the money. Kamat told his brothers that Rahul was not killed and was still alive. Kamat's assistant knows that there was something wrong, so he brings Pappu with him. His grandma comes and kills all the bad guys. Pappu beats up the ACP. When Paapu tells his feelings to Suniel Shetty, he takes her inside the theater. Sapna tells Pappu her feelings. The movie ends when she runs up to him and hugs him.

== Cast ==
- Zohra Sehgal as Dadi (Pappu's grand mother)
- Govinda as Pappu
- Rani Mukerji as Sapna
- Kader Khan as Kokibhai
- Sanjay Suri as Rahul
- Johnny Lever as Police Officer
- Mink Singh as Bobby
- Gulshan Grover as ACP Kamat
- Suniel Shetty as himself (special appearance)
- Asrani
- Mushtaq Khan
- Mukesh Khanna
- Ishrat Ali as the make-up man
- Razak Khan

== Soundtrack ==
Chalo Ishq Ladaaye

Soundtrack album by Himesh Reshammiya
- Released: 27 December 2002 (India)
- Recorded: 2002
- Venue: Mumbai
- Genre: Feature film soundtrack
- Producer: Himesh Reshammiya

Himesh Reshammiya chronology
Yeh Hai Jalwa (2002)	Chalo Ishq Ladaaye (2002)	Chura Liyaa Hai Tumne (2002)

Music by Himesh Reshammiya. Lyrics by Sameer.

Song	Singer
"Chalo Ishq Ladaaye"	Sonu Nigam, Alka Yagnik
"Masti Masti"	Sonu Nigam, Alka Yagnik
"Pyaar Ka Funda"	Sonu Nigam, Kavita Krishnamurthy
"Tujhko Hi Dulhan"	Sonu Nigam, Alka Yagnik
"Aa Pyaar Kare Bindaas"	Sonu Nigam, Jaani Babu Qawwal (Humming)
"Pote Ko Dulha Banaongi"	Sonu Nigam, Shobha Joshi
