= Raju Mavani =

Indian film actor, director and producer (1957-2019)

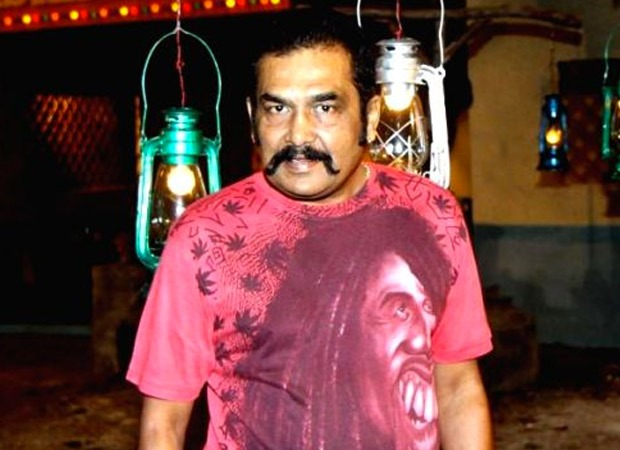
- Born: 1957; India
- Died: 31 October 2019 (aged 61–62)
- Occupations: Director, producer, actor, screenplay writer
- Spouse: Daksha Mavani

Raju Mavani (1957 – 31 October 2019) was an Indian film director, producer, actor and screenplay writer. He had worked on many films and was known for his acting skills while playing a negative character.

== Biography ==
Mavani was born in 1957. He was the producer of Balwaan which was released in 1992. This film was the debut film of Sunil Shetty. He also produced Imtihaan. He directed many films too. Apart from producing and directing he also acted in films like Sarkar, Wanted, Shootout at Wadala and Policegiri.

== Death ==
Raju Mavani died of cancer on 31 October 2019 in Mumbai at the age of 62.

== Filmography ==
=== Producer, director and writer ===
| Year | Film | Producer | Director | Writer | Source |
|---|---|---|---|---|---|
| 1989 | Ilaaka | Yes | | | |
| 1992 | Balwaan | Yes | | | |
| 1994 | Imtihan | Yes | | | |
| 1995 | Surakshaa | | Yes | | |
| 1996 | Ram Aur Shyam | Yes | Yes | | |
| 1998 | Iski Topi Uske Sarr | | Yes | | |
| 2003 | Mudda – The Issue | Yes | | | |
| 2004 | Ab...Bas! | Yes | | | |
| 2014 | Anuradha | | Yes | Yes | |

=== Actor ===
| Year | Film | Role | Source |
|---|---|---|---|
| 1992 | Balwaan | | |
| 1998 | Satya | Guru Narayan | |
| 1999 | Mast | Inspector | |
| 2000 | Deewane | | |
| 2000 | Ghaath | Salim | |
| 2001 | Mitti | Phala Keshto | |
| 2002 | Vadh | | |
| 2002 | Jaani Dushman: Ek Anokhi Kahani | | |
| 2002 | Marshal | | |
| 2005 | D | Mangli | |
| 2005 | Sarkar | Vishram Bhagat | |
| 2006 | Darwaaza Bandh Rakho | Mushtaq Bhai | |
| 2006 | Shiva | Inspector Tavde | |
| 2008 | Money Hai Toh Honey Hai | Mr. Wadhwa | |
| 2009 | Wanted | Datta Pawle | |
| 2011 | Kya Yahi Sach Hai | Ramanand | |
| 2012 | Rangdari | Sadhu Singh | |
| 2013 | Zila Ghaziabad | Manveer Singh | |
| 2013 | Shootout at Wadala | Yakub Lala | |
| 2013 | Policegiri | MLA | |
| 2014 | Jai Ho | Home Minister P. A. | |
| 2014 | Anuradha | | |
| 2014 | Lateef: The King of Crime | | |
| 2015 | Uvaa | Divan | |
| 2016 | Robin Hood Ke Potte | | |
