= Mukesh Duggal =

Indian film producer

- Born: Mumbai, Maharashtra, India
- Died: 7 March 1997; Mumbai, Maharashtra, India
- Occupations: Film producer Film director
- Known for: Dil Ka Kya Kasoor; Gopi Kishan

Mukesh Duggal was an Indian film producer who has produced many notable films of 90's. Duggal's lone directorial Gopi Kishan and Saathi were commercially successful films.

== Career ==
Mukesh Duggal started his career as a producer with the 1991 Sanjay Dutt starrer Fateh, followed by the successful Saathi, directed by Mahesh Bhatt starring Aditya Pancholi and Pakistan cricketer Mohsin Khan in lead roles. Duggal made his debut as a director with Gopi Kishan, the 1994 Sunil Shetty (double role) starrer. Dil Ka Kya Kasoor with late Divya Bharti, Platform starring Ajay Devgn and Khilona starring Monica Bedi were his other notable films.

== Death ==
On 7 March 1997, Duggal was killed at Seven Bungalows, Andheri, by unidentified people for using actress Monica Bedi forcibly to act as a mediator between the financiers and the underworld, as per a Crime Branch official.

== Filmography ==
Year	Title	Role	Ref.
1996	Khilona	Producer	
1994	Gopi Kishan	Producer/Director	
1994	Milan	Producer	
1993	Platform	Producer	
1992	Dil Ka Kya Kasoor	Producer	
1991	Saathi	Producer	
1991	Fateh	Producer	
