= Ilaaka =

- Poster
- Directed by: Aziz Sejawal
- Written by: Javed Siddiqui
- Produced by: Jyoti Guha; Raju Mavani
- Starring: Mithun Chakraborty; Sanjay Dutt; Amrita Singh; Madhuri Dixit; Raakhee Gulzar; Om Puri; Amrish Puri; Dharmendra
- Cinematography: Arvind Laad
- Edited by: Waman B. Bhosle; Gurudutt Shirali
- Music by: Nadeem-Shravan
- Release date: 12 May 1989
- Running time: 155 minutes
- Country: India
- Language: Hindi
- Budget: ₹25.8 million
- Box office: ₹65.7 million

Ilaaka (transl. Turf, Area, District, Locality) is a 1989 Indian Hindi-language action drama film directed by Aziz Sejawal. It features an ensemble cast of Mithun Chakraborty, Sanjay Dutt, Amrita Singh, Madhuri Dixit, Raakhee Gulzar, Om Puri, Amrish Puri along with Dharmendra making a special appearance. Ilaaka was released worldwide on 12 May 1989 and received mixed reviews from critics. Nonetheless, it was a commercial success at the box office.

== Plot ==
Ilaaka is the story of Raja, who always stands up against injustice and corruption. Raja is in love with Vidya, the school master's daughter. He is supported by Inspector Suraj Verma. Their fight is against the 'Father of Evil', Naagar, as he controls the entire Ilaaka (area). Sub-Inspector Neha is the love of Suraj. Inspector Dharam Verma has a score to settle with Naagar. Naagar unleashes his reign of terror.

== Cast ==
- Mithun Chakraborty as Raja
- Sanjay Dutt as Inspector Suraj Verma
- Madhuri Dixit as Vidya
- Amrita Singh as Sub-Inspector Neha Singh
- Dharmendra as Inspector Dharam Verma (Cameo)
- Raakhee as Mrs. Dharam Verma
- Om Puri as Bheema
- Dalip Tahil as Niranjan
- Amrish Puri as Naagar
- Goga Kapoor as Swami
- Mahesh Anand as Swami's Son
- Arun Bakshi as Babban
- Avtar Gill as MLA Becharam
- Praveen Kumar as Naagar's Henchman
- Johnny Lever as Chhote Swami
- Mac Mohan as Mohan
- Yunus Parvez as Member of Parliament
- Bharat Bhushan as Man With Suitcase
- Asha Sharma as Mrs. Singh
- Jagdeep as Constable Thanedar Tehsildar Singh
- A. K. Hangal as School Master
- Bharat Kapoor as Birju
- Manik Irani as Ustad
- Gurbachan Singh as Smuggler who kidnapped children
- Gavin Packard as Smuggler who kidnapped children
- Huma Khan as Dancer

== Soundtrack ==
Songs were written by Anjaan (lyricist), Sameer Anjaan and Anwar Sagar and set to music by Nadeem-Shravan.

Song	Singer	Lyrics
"Khali Botal"	Asha Bhosle, Kishore Kumar	Anwar Sagar
"Deva O Deva"	Asha Bhosle, Kishore Kumar	Anjaan
"Aayi Hai Aaj To"	Asha Bhosle, Amit Kumar	Anjaan
"Pyar Se Bhi Zyada"	Asha Bhosle, Mohammed Aziz	Sameer Anjaan
"Aaj Mujhe Peene De"	Mithun Chakraborty	Anjaan
