= Palay Khan (film) =

- DVD cover
- Directed by: Ashim Samanta
- Produced by: Shakti Samanta
- Starring: Jackie Shroff; Poonam Dhillon; Farah
- Music by: R. D. Burman
- Release date: 12 December 1986
- Country: India
- Language: Hindi

Palay Khan is a 1986 Indian Hindi-language film directed by Ashim Samanta and produced by Shakti Samanta under his own production Shakti Films. The film stars Jackie Shroff as Palay Khan, with Poonam Dhillon, Farah in other pivotal roles. The music was composed by R. D. Burman. Palay Khan was a favourite script lying with Shakti Samanta from mid 70s and he announced the movie with Rajesh Khanna but he could make the movie in the mid 80s only.

== Plot ==
The British government have taken over their rule in a deserted region in India, but some of the people there strive for freedom. One of these brave freedom fighters is Palay Khan, who owes his intelligence to the entire region. When British soldiers attack, he is always present to defend, and now he and his gang are wanted by the British, no stone is left unturned to catch him, but all ways prove futile until one day, a British officer by the name of Gulbaaz Khan manages to abduct one of Palay Khan loyal associates, Amar Singh and held him captive until Palay Khan surrenders. But in retaliation, Palay and his gang kidnap Helen, the daughter of British General Bonz, but eventually, Palay and Helen fall in love. This love might as well bring about the change in hatred for love between the British government and the freedom fighters.

== Cast ==
- Jackie Shroff as Palay Khan
- Poonam Dhillon as Zulekha Khan
- Farah as Helen Bonz
- Suresh Oberoi as Dr. Ramkrishna Sinha
- Puneet Issar as Amar Singh
- Shakti Kapoor as British Officer Mohammed Gulbaaz Khan
- Anupam Kher as British General Bonz
- Raza Murad as Khan Ali Hassan Khan
- Sushma Seth as Fatima Khanam
- Dinesh Thakur as Qazi Alimuddin Shah
- Satyen Kappu as Gangadin
- Kamal Kapoor as Military Court Judge
- Tom Alter as Military Court Official
- Bob Christo as British Officer Smith
- Manik Irani as British Officer Tegh Ali Khan
- Mac Mohan as Kareemuddin Khan
- Roopesh Kumar as Mohammed Jamaal Khan

== Soundtrack ==
The music was given by R. D. Burman while Anand Bakshi wrote the lyrics for the film. The soundtrack was released by Saregama.

Song	Singer
"Salma Ko Mil Gaya"	Lata Mangeshkar
"Mere Sanam" (Sad)	Lata Mangeshkar
"Mere Sanam Tera Khat Mila" (Happy)	Lata Mangeshkar, Suresh Wadkar
"Allah Ka Naam Le, Himmat Se Kaam Le"	Kishore Kumar, Suresh Wadkar
"O Sanam Mere Sanam"	Asha Bhosle
"Kabul Se Aaya Hai"	Asha Bhosle

== See also ==
- List of Asian historical drama films
