= Balwaan =

- Poster
- Directed by: Deepak Anand
- Story by: Jay Raj Productions Story Department
- Produced by: Raju Mavani
- Starring: Suniel Shetty; Divya Bharti
- Cinematography: Manish Bhatt
- Edited by: A. Muthu
- Music by: Mahesh-Kishore
- Production company: Jayraj Productions
- Release date: 11 September 1992
- Running time: 142 min
- Country: India
- Language: Hindi

Balwaan (transl. Mighty) is a 1992 Indian Hindi-language action film directed by Deepak Anand and produced by Raju Mavani. The film stars Suniel Shetty in his debut, with Divya Bharti, Tinu Anand and Danny Denzongpa in pivotal roles.

== Plot ==
Arjun Singh comes from a poor family. He lives in a small and shabby tenement with his mother and sister. Studying at college, he falls in love with the beautiful Deepa. One day, he attacks a corrupt police officer and is sent to prison for that. Deepa bails him from jail with the help of her father Police Commissioner, Raj Sahni. Deepa's father wants Arjun to join the police force as he feels that the department needs some honest officers. He joins the police force, and gets posted to another city where his predecessor was killed by the goons. He goes to the city along with his mother and sister. This puts him into conflict with a notorious gangster, Bhaiji. In order to teach Arjun a lesson, Bhaiji orders people in this community to stop interacting with Arjun and his family, as a result the three are alienated. His sister and his mother pass away. Then, Bhaiji has Arjun captured and chained, but Arjun manages to escape, only to find that he has been framed for murder and is arrested by the police.

== Cast ==
- Suniel Shetty as Inspector Arjun Singh
- Divya Bharti as Deepa Sahni
- Tinu Anand as Police Commissioner Raj Sahni
- Danny Denzongpa as Bhaiji
- Ishrat Ali as Minister Lambu Atta
- Arun Bakshi as Inspector Tanya Palok
- Anjana Mumtaz as Arjun's mother
- Avtar Gill as ACP
- Vikram Gokhale as Police Inspector
- Neena Gupta as Ratna
- Pankaj Berry as Pankaj
- Guddi Maruti as Radha
- Raju Shrestha as Mukesh
- Kim as Dancer / Singer

== Soundtrack ==
Balwaan

Soundtrack album by Mahesh–Kishore
- Released: 19 July 1992
- Genre: Feature film soundtrack
- Label: Venus Records & Tapes

Lyrics penned by Dev Kohli, Anwar Sagar and Gauhar Kanpuri.

Song	Singer
"Jalta Hai Badan Yeh"	Alisha Chinoy
"Raat Kal Tumhari"	Vinod Rathod
"Dip Dip Dip Dip"	Kavita Krishnamurthy
"Kya Cheez Hai Mohabbat Yeh"	Kavita Krishnamurthy, Kumar Sanu
"Dhin Tak, Dhin Tak"	Abhijeet, Sapna Mukherjee
"Assa Dil Tere Kadman"	Asha Bhosle, Arun Bakshi
