= Puli (1985 film) =

- Theatrical release poster
- Directed by: Raj Bharat
- Written by: Satyanand (dialogues)
- Screenplay by: Raj Bharat
- Story by: Raj Bharat
- Produced by: Anam Gopala Krishna Reddy
- Starring: Chiranjeevi; Radha
- Cinematography: Lok Singh
- Edited by: M. Vellai Swamy
- Music by: Chakravarthy
- Production company: Sri Venkata Krishna Films
- Release date: 26 June 1985
- Running time: 121 mins
- Country: India
- Language: Telugu

Puli (transl. Tiger) is a 1985 Telugu-language action film directed by Raj Bharat. Produced by Anam Gopala Krishna Reddy, the film stars Chiranjeevi and Radha, with music composed by Chakravarthy. The film was a Hit at the box office.

== Cast ==
- Chiranjeevi as Kranthi
- Radha as Radha
- Rao Gopal Rao as J.K.
- Satyanarayana as Pratap Rao
- Allu Ramalingaiah as Narasimham
- Rajendra Prasad as Inspector Prasad
- Nutan Prasad as Inspector Shyam
- Subhalekha Sudhakar as Gopi
- Sudarshan as Naagu
- Chitti Babu
- Annapurna as Savitri
- Samyuktha as Lakshmi
- Silk Smitha as item number
- Jagga Rao as J.K.'s bodyguard
- Pemmasani Ramakrishna as James

== Music ==
Puli

Film score by Chakravarthy
- Released: 1985
- Genre: Soundtrack
- Length: 20:39
- Label: AVM Audio
- Producer: Chakravarthy

Chakravarthy chronology
Chiranjeevi (1985)	Puli (1985)	Rakta Sindhuram (1985)

Music was composed by Chakravarthy. Lyrics were written by Veturi. Music was released on AVM Audio Company.

S. No.	Song title	Singers	length
1	"Nunna Nunnani Ollu"	S. P. Balasubrahmanyam, P. Susheela	4:22
2	"Kanda Chusi Gunde Chusi"	S. P. Balasubrahmanyam, S. Janaki	3:45
3	"Edukintha Kopalu"	S. P. Balasubrahmanyam, P. Susheela	4:24
4	"Maa Kanti Papaku"	S. P. Balasubrahmanyam, P. Susheela	3:40
5	"O Maavayyo"	S. Janaki	4:28

== Other ==
- VCDs and DVDs on - SHALIMAR Video Company, Hyderabad
