= Saathi: The Companion =

Saathi
- Directed by: Faaiz Anwar
- Written by: V. K. Shankar
- Screenplay by: V. K. Shankar
- Story by: V. K. Shankar
- Cinematography: Akram Khan
- Edited by: Ashfaque Makrani
- Music by: Nikhil–Vinay
- Production company: Dreamcraft Productions
- Release date: 7 October 2005
- Country: India
- Language: Hindi

Saathi: The Companion is a 2005 film. The film was a box office failure.

== Cast ==
- Rupa Dutta as Varsha
- Divvij Kak as Vijay
- Anchal Anand as Anjali
- Sameer Ali Khan as Akash
- Alok Nath
- Beena Banerjee
- Tiku Talsania
- Gajendra Chauhan
- Razak Khan
- Narendra Bedi

== Music ==
1. Tumse Dil Kya Laga Liya Humne (2) – Sanjeev, Shreya Ghoshal, Roop Kumar Rathod
2. Tumko Ham Iss Kadar Pyaar Karne Lage – Kumar Sanu, Shreya Ghoshal
3. Kehata Hai Dil Sun Ae Sanam – Shaan
4. Kitna Akela Tha Dil – Priya Bhattacharya, Udit Narayan
5. Tumse Dil Kya Laga Liya Hamne – Roop Kumar Rathod
6. Yeh Chehara, Yeh Rangat – Kumar Sanu
