= Dil Ka Kya Kasoor =

1992 film by Lawrence D'Souza

- Poster
- Directed by: Lawrence D'Souza
- Written by: Talat Rekhi (dialogue, screenplay and story)
- Produced by: Mukesh Duggal
- Starring: Divya Bharti; Prithvi; Suresh Oberoi; Laxmikant Berde
- Cinematography: Lawrence D'Souza
- Edited by: A.R. Rajendran
- Music by: Nadeem-Shravan
- Release date: 31 January 1992
- Country: India
- Language: Hindi

Dil Ka Kya Kasoor (transl. How is the heart at fault?) is a 1992 Indian Hindi-language musical melodrama film directed by Lawrence D'Souza. It stars Divya Bharti and debutant Prithvi with Sanam, Suresh Oberoi and Laxmikant Berde in supporting roles. The music of the film, from the duo Nadeem-Shravan, was an instant hit due to its catchy melodies.

== Plot ==
Shalini (Divya Bharti) is the only sister of a rich businessman, Rajesh Saxena (Suresh Oberoi). Shalini falls in love with her classmate, Arun Kumar (Prithvi) after he performs a song that was authored by her under a pseudonym. However, she doesn't tell Arun about this because he doesn't like her; he thinks Shalini is a spoiled rich girl; she had behaved thusly a few times with him and some others. Without disclosing his own identity or purpose, Shalini's brother Rajesh goes to meet Arun, only to find out that he is an orphan, is from an underprivileged background, and is living in a hostel room, since he doesn't have a house of his own. Arun also rejects any help from Rajesh, as he would prefer to face the world on his own.

Rajesh tells Shalini that he will only arrange her marriage to Arun if Arun reaches a status in society comparable to theirs. Shalini knows that Arun is a good singer because he often sings at college functions and decides to confess her love when Arun becomes what he deserves as she neither wants to make her love a bondage for Arun nor wants to go against her brother. She tells her friend, Madhu, to use her money to start up a music/stage production company and indirectly encourages Arun to become a singer. She starts writing songs for Arun Kumar (without publishing those elsewhere) but still prefers to remain anonymous. Arun gets these songs from an editor, Mr. Verma, who tells him that these songs are written by a girl called Seema (Shalini/Divya Bharti - who wishes to stay anonymous). Through her songs, Arun becomes popular and wealthy in a short while and wants to express his gratitude by meeting her. However, Mr. Verma maintains Seema's anonymity, allowing Arun to correspond via letters.

Finally, Shalini's brother is ready to get her married to (a very successful) Arun Kumar (Prithvi), and also announces his intention to Shalini. But they soon find out that Arun has married the principal's daughter, Meena. The marriage was not the culmination of any romance, but rather the apt thing to do when the principal, who was a mentor to Arun, suddenly died, leaving his lone daughter behind without any support.

Shalini then decides to remain unmarried for the rest of her life. However, due to her love remaining unrequited and the heartbreak caused by it, her health gradually deteriorates and she is hospitalized due to patches detected in her lungs. Mr. Verma tells Arun that Seema (shalini?DIvya) is in the hospital and about to die. He goes to the hospital, only to find out that Seema is none other than Shalini. He tells his wife about Shalini and they go to the hospital together, where Arun symbolically accepts Shalini as his wife Meena (on being encouraged by Meena), but Shalini soon passes away. A daughter is born to the pregnant Meena, who is named Seema to honor the memory of Shalini.

== Cast ==
- Divya Bharti as Shalini Saxena / Seema
- Prithvi as Arun Kumar
- Sanam Patel as Meena
- Suresh Oberoi as Rajesh Saxena
- Laxmikant Berde as Murli
- Satyendra Kappu as Kaka
- Shehnaz Kudia as Shalini's Friend
- Kishore Anand Bhanushali as Kishore Anand
- Shymakanta as pronoy

== Reception ==
The film was a musical bonanza, but failed to create an impact at the box office becoming a box office bomb. Despite its failure, the performance of Divya Bharti as the main protagonist received appreciation and is considered one of her best performances.

== Soundtrack ==
The music for all the songs was composed by Nadeem-Shravan. The title track and "Mera Sanam Sabse Pyara Hai" were popular numbers. Most of the songs are sung by Kumar Sanu. Other singers include Asha Bhosle, Sadhana Sargam, Alka Yagnik, Udit Narayan.

Dil Ka Kya Kasoor

Soundtrack album by Nadeem Shravan
- Released: 1992
- Recorded: 1991
- Genre: Feature film soundtrack
- Length: 47:07
- Label: Tips
- Producer: Nadeem-Shravan

Nadeem Shravan chronology
Sadak (1991)	Dil Ka Kya Kasoor (1992)	Sapne Sajan Ke (1992)

#	Song	Singer	Lyricist
1	"Dil Jigar Nazar Kya Hai"	Kumar Sanu	Nawab Arzoo
2	"Mera Sanam Sabse Pyara Hai"	Kumar Sanu, Asha Bhosle	Sameer
3	"Aashiqui Mein Har Aashiq"	Sadhana Sargam	Sameer
4	"Gaa Raha Hoon Is Mehfil Mein"	Kumar Sanu	Anwar Sagar
5	"Milne Ki Tum Koshish Karna"	Kumar Sanu, Asha Bhosle	Madan Pal
6	"Khata To Jab Ho"	Kumar Sanu, Alka Yagnik	Anwar Sagar
7	"Do Baje Aankh Ladi"	Udit Narayan, Vicky Mehta	Anwar Sagar
8	"Dil Ka Kya Kasoor"	Kumar Sanu	Sameer

== See also ==
- Saiyaara
