= Himmatvar =

- Promotional Poster
- Directed by: Talat Jani
- Produced by: Shakeel Chisthi
- Starring: Dharmendra; Hitesh; Rubaina Khan
- Music by: Nadeem-Shravan
- Release date: 14 June 1996
- Country: India
- Language: Hindi

Himmatvar is a 1996 Bollywood action drama film directed by Talat Jani, starring Dharmendra, Mukesh Khanna and Gajendra Chouhan.

== Plot ==
This is the life of Sultan, who is a kind-hearted and innocent person forced to become a gangster.

== Cast ==
- Dharmendra as Sultan
- Rubaina Khan as Anjali
- Hitesh as Jai
- Mukesh Khanna as Inspector Rajeshwar
- Gajendra Chouhan as Inspector Patil
- Bharat Kapoor as Inspector Shrikant
- Mohan Joshi as Damodar / DK
- Neelam Mehra as Mrs. Rajeshwar

== Soundtrack ==
The songs were written by Sameer, Anwar Sagar and Nadeem, and were composed by Nadeem-Shravan.

#	Title	Singer(s)	Lyricist
1	"Kitni Chaahat"	Babul Supriyo, Sadhana Sargam	Sameer
2	"Aag Chahaat Ki Lag Jayegi"	Babul Supriyo, Alka Yagnik	Sameer
3	"Saqi Surhai Sharab"	Kumar Sanu, Alka Yagnik	Anwar Sagar
4	"Kya Mila Hai Sila"	Alka Yagnik	Nadeem
5	"Humein Aapse Milke"	Sonu Nigam, Sapna Mukherjee	Sameer
6	"Pyar Ka Mitha Mitha"	Udit Narayan, Alka Yagnik	Sameer
