= Lal Salam (disambiguation) =

Lal Salam is a phrase used by communists in South Asia.

Lal Salam or Lal Salaam may also refer to:

- Lal Salam (1990 film), an Indian Malayalam-language film
- Lal Salaam (2002 film), an Indian Bollywood musical action drama film
- Lal Salaam (2024 film), an Indian Tamil-language film
- Lal Salam (TV series), an Indian talk show
