= 9 O'Clock =

- Official Poster
- Directed by: Amrit Raj Thakur
- Story by: Dev Vrat Singh
- Produced by: Gaurav Shankar
- Starring: Dev Vart Singh; Kashiff Khan; Arun Bakshi; Raju Thakkar.
- Cinematography: Avijeet Nandi
- Edited by: Akhilesh Mitra
- Music by: Bipulendra Haloi; Background score: Narendra Sinha
- Production company: Tejas Films Pvt. Ltd. Shubham Soni Foundation
- Distributed by: Pioneer
- Release date: 24 February 2017
- Running time: 124 min
- Country: India
- Language: Hindi

9 O' Clock is a Hindi film starring Dev Vart Singh, Arun Bakshi, Kashiff Khan and Raju Thakkar. It is directed by Amrit Raj Thakur. The movie was telecast on the channel Enter10 on 10 June 2018.

== Synopsis ==
A team of researchers visits an isolated jungle to find bio-diesel sources and don't return.

== Cast ==
- Arun Bakshi as Nasim
- Kashiff khan as Javed
- Raju Thakkar as Afzal
- Santosh Shrivastav
- Partho Pratim Banerjee
- Muskaan Sinha as Ishita
