= Parinam (2004 film) =

- Directed by: Tanmoy Mukhopadhyay
- Produced by: Jakir Hosen
- Starring: Sharad Kapoor; Nagma; Victor Banerjee
- Music by: Babul Bose
- Release date: 1 January 2004
- Country: India
- Language: Bengali

Parinam is a 2004 Indian Bengali-language film directed by Tanmoy Mukhopadhyay and starring Sharad Kapoor, Nagma and Victor Banerjee in the lead roles. This movie was remade in Bangladesh as Eri Naam Bhalobasha starring Ferdous, Racy, Razzak and Humayun Faridi in the lead roles.

== Cast ==
- Sharad Kapoor
- Nagma
- Victor Banerjee
- Biplab Chatterjee
- Kharaj Mukherjee
- Sanjib Dasgupta
- Shakuntala Barua
- Rathin Bose

== Production ==
The film was shot in September 2004.

== Soundtrack ==
The film music was composed by Babul Bose.

Track	Song	Singer(s)
1	"Aajke Sobar Ghumer Chhuti"	Kumar Sanu, Shreya Ghoshal
2	"Je Deshe Ramdhanu Eke"	Udit Narayan, Alka Yagnik
3	"Rajprasade Rajar Kumar Chhilo"	Kumar Sanu, Shreya Ghoshal
4	"Sundori Kholo Na"	Shaan
5	"Laal Neel Sobuje"	Udit Narayan, Alka Yagnik
6	"Poth Bhola Aami Ek Pothik Elam"	Hariharan, Kumar Sanu, Shreya Ghoshal
7	"Dui Diner Ei Jibontate"	Khoraj Mukherjee
