= Yamakinkarudu =

- Theatrical release poster
- Directed by: Raj Bharat
- Produced by: Allu Aravind
- Starring: Chiranjeevi; Radhika
- Music by: K. Chakravarthy
- Production company: Geetha Arts
- Release date: 22 October 1982
- Running time: 129 min
- Country: India
- Language: Telugu

Yamakinkarudu (transl. Agent of death) is a 1982 Indian Telugu-language action film directed by Raj Bharat and produced by Allu Aravind. This film stars Chiranjeevi, Radhika, and Sarath Babu. The screenplay was mainly adapted from the films Dirty Harry and Mad Max. It was a success at the box-office.

== Plot ==
Vijay (Chiranjeevi) and Kishore (Sarath Babu) are childhood friends and both work in police department. They put a goon called Jackal behind bars and he vows revenge on them before going to jail. Kishore's sister (Radhika) is in love with vijay. They get married and have a kid. Jackal escapes from jail and kills Kishore. Now its Vijay's turn to bring Jackal and his gang to justice and put an end to their atrocities.

== Cast ==
- Chiranjeevi .... Vijay
- Radhika .... Radha
- Kaikala Satyanarayana
- Sarath Babu .... Kishore
- Jaggayya
- Sudarshan .... Jackal
- Jayamalini
- Silk Smitha
- Telephone Satyanarayana
- Dham
- Prakashi Rao
- Babu Rao
- Jagga Rao
- Babu

== Music ==
- Music: K. Chakravarthy
- Playback singers: S.P. Balasubramaniam P. Susheela S. Janaki
- Lyrics: Arudra Veturi Sundararama Murthy
