= Milan (1994 film) =

1994 film

- Poster
- Directed by: Mahesh Bhatt
- Written by: Robin Bhatt; Akash Khurana; Sujit Sen
- Produced by: Mukesh Duggal
- Starring: Jackie Shroff; Manisha Koirala
- Cinematography: Pravin Bhatt
- Edited by: Sanjay Sankla
- Music by: Anand–Milind
- Production companies: Prince & Prince Movies
- Release date: 4 February 1994
- Country: India
- Language: Hindi
- Budget: ₹1,70 crore
- Box office: ₹2,44 crore

Milan is a 1994 Indian Hindi action romance film directed by Mahesh Bhatt. The film stars Jackie Shroff, Manisha Koirala in lead roles.

== Plot ==
Raja is a small-time smuggler. His sweetheart, Priya, does not approve of this, and convinces him to give up his smuggling activities, and turn the information over to the police. He does so, only to find that he has been framed for a murder he did not commit. When he decides to entrust himself to the justice of the courts, he is convicted of murder and sentenced to jail. In jail, he encounters more problems, and needs all his wits to stay alive. Back to Priya; Raja's former smuggling colleagues, including corrupt police officers, are openly harassing her, and no one seems to be able to look after her. Raja must get out of jail to find out who has framed him, and who is the king-pin behind the smuggling ring.

== Cast ==
- Jackie Shroff as Raja
- Manisha Koirala as Priya
- Paresh Rawal as Inspector Kotak
- Gulshan Grover as Kevin Khekra
- Akash Khurana as Raja's Brother
- Mushtaq Khan as Shantaram
- Tom Alter as Father D'Mello
- Mahesh Anand as Latif (Cameo Appearance)
- Sudha Chandran as Jaya
- Avtar Gill as ACP

== Music ==
Music was by Anand–Milind. Lyrics were by Sameer.

- "Kahin Toh Milegi": Abhijeet
- "Aanewali Hai Milan Ki Ghadi": Abhijeet
- "Aa Jaana Haseen Sama Hai Pyar Ka": Abhijeet, Kavita Krishnamurthy
- "Ladki Jab Aaye Bazaar Mein": Kumar Sanu, Kavita Krishnamurthy
- "Ek Baat Bataoon, Batao": Kumar Sanu, Sadhana Sargam
- "Aansoo Judaai Ke": Pankaj Udhas, Sadhana Sargam
