= The Good Maharaja =

- First look poster
- Directed by: Vikash Verma
- Written by: Hitesh Desai
- Produced by: G7 Films Poland
- Starring: Sanjay Dutt; Dhruv Verma; Deepraj Rana; Gulshan Grover; Sharad Kapoor
- Music by: Hariharan
- Production company: G7 Films Poland
- Release date: 18 December 2026
- Countries: India; Poland
- Languages: Hindi; English; Polish
- Budget: ₹400 crore (US$42 million)

The Good Maharaja (transl. The Good King) is an upcoming Indo-Polish war epic film directed by Vikash Verma, and produced by G7 Films Poland. The film stars Sanjay Dutt in the title role of Digvijaysinhji Ranjitsinhji Jadeja, the Maharaja Jam Sahib of Nawanagar (now Jamnagar, Gujarat, India). The film also features Dhruv Verma in lead role, while Deepraj Rana, Gulshan Grover and Sharad Kapoor in supporting roles. The film is scheduled for a worldwide release on December 18, 2026, through a collaboration between Steamroller Productions and G7 Films.

Principal photography began on 21 February 2020, with the scenes of the film being shot in 3 languages: Hindi, English and Polish. The film was produced on a budget of ₹400 crore (US$42 million).

== Cast ==
- Sanjay Dutt as Maharaja Digvijaysinhji Ranjitsinhji Jadeja
- Dhruv Verma as a soldier and sniper
- Deepraj Rana as Kishan
- Gulshan Grover as Ajay Jadeja
- Sharad Kapoor as Yuvaraja Vijay Karmar

== Production ==
Principal photography began on 21 February 2020, with the scenes of the film being shot in 3 languages: Hindi, English and Polish. The shooting of the film was interrupted due to COVID-19 pandemic. The film is set during the time of World War II. The film was expected to be shot in London, Russia, Poland and India.

Shiamak Davar has served as the choreographer, while film's music and background score has been composed by Hariharan.

== Controversy ==
The Good Maharaja is based on Digvijaysinhji Ranjitsinhji Jadeja, the Maharaja Jam Sahib of Nawanagar, Gujarat, who, in the pre-Independence era, provided refuge and education to around 1,000 Polish children evacuated from the Union of soviet socialist republics (USSR) to escape German bombings during World War II.

The film was originally supposed to be made by Omung Kumar of Legend Studios. After the release of the first look, the daughters of Maharaja Digvijaysinhji Ranjitsinhji sent a cease and desist notice to the makers, Omung Kumar and Sandeep Singh; co-owners of Legend Studios. The legal representative of the daughters claimed, "The Maharaja was a public figure and if the facts are distorted, it will tarnish his image. Hence our clients have objection to the film, as no permission is sought from them." Sandeep Singh argued that no permission needed from the heirs of the Maharaja, and went on that "this legal action against the film is only an attempt to seek publicity by the Maharaja's family". Singh said that the story of the Maharaja is in the public domain. After that, Vikash Verma took over the film as the director.
