= Platform (1993 film) =

1993 Indian film by Deepak Pawar

- Poster
- Directed by: Deepak Pawar
- Written by: Javed Siddiqui, Robin Bhatt, Sujit Sen, Sanjeev Duggal, Mukesh Duggal
- Produced by: Mukesh Duggal
- Starring: Ajay Devgan; Tisca Chopra; Prithvi; Kiran Kumar; Mohnish Bahl; Paresh Rawal
- Cinematography: Rajan Kinagi
- Edited by: Suresh Chaturvedi
- Music by: Anand–Milind
- Production companies: Mata Sherwali, Prince & Prince International
- Release date: 23 April 1993
- Running time: 150 minutes
- Country: India
- Language: Hindi

Platform is a 1993 Indian Hindi-language action film directed by Deepak Pawar and starring Ajay Devgan in the lead, with Tisca Chopra (Credited as Priya Arora in her debut screen name), Prithvi, and Paresh Rawal.

== Plot ==
Platform follows the story of two brothers, Raju and Vikram, who at a young age lose their mother, after which Vikram raises Raju, working at kind hearted Bhaiya Saab's hotel. Hariya, a dope gangster antagonistic to Bhaiya Saab, one night guns him. Police inspector Joshi tries to arrest Vikram for the murder. Vikram escapes and tries to flee the city with Raju, but at the platform leaves Raju for a moment, only to be caught by Joshi. Hariya convinces Raju that Vikram has abandoned him and will never return, taking him under his criminal wing.

Vikram is sentenced for murder, and Raju grows as an efficient henchman of Hariya, eliminating all of Hariya's rivals except Shetty. Having nearly completed his sentence, Vikram breaks out of jail to meet his brother, hoping to expose Hariya's criminality, but Raju rejects him and stands by Hariya. Shetty plans to kill both Hariya and Raju, despite warnings from his astrologer twin brother Shani Avatar to avoid trouble. Soon Raju steals some of Shetty's money. Vikram offers to kill Hariya for Shetty but to spare Raju's life in return. Shetty agrees on his conditions. Hariya learns of this and tells Raju to eliminate Shetty and Vikram. Vikram convinces Joshi about the truth, but is then kidnapped by Shetty. Shetty now threatens Raju with the deaths of Vikram and their girlfriends if he does not return the money. Raju decides to return the money to save Vikram, but Hariya hears of it and now allies with Shetty to kill both brothers.

The climax reaches the railway platform with Vikram hanging by his arms above the tracks. Raju douses Shetty's money in alcohol threatening to burn it, ordering Hariya to confess to his role in the killings and separation of both brothers. Shetty, worried about his money, coerces Hariya to do so at gunpoint. Inspector Joshi appears, having heard Hariya's confession, prompting a firefight. Raju guns down the gangsters and frees his brother just in time as a speeding train arrives. Vikram falls prone on the tracks, the train passing over him harmlessly.

Joshi arrests Shetty, but Hariya escapes. Raju catches up with Hariya, overturning his speeding car. An old rival turns up and both assault Raju, who, strengthened by his mother's chain, fights off the two just as the fuel explodes, killing Hariya. Raju staggers out of the debris, falling into Vikram's arms as the brothers reunite.

== Cast ==
- Ajay Devgan as Raju
- Tisca Chopra as Tina
- Prithvi as Vikram
- Nandini Singh as Seema
- Kiran Kumar as Inspector Joshi
- Mohnish Behl as Hariya
- Paresh Rawal as Shetty Mudaliar / Shani Avatar
- Surendra Pal as Hariya's Brother
- Anjana Mumtaz as Raju and Vikram's Mother
- Mushtaq Khan as Arjun
- Gavin Packard as Cheetah

== Reception ==
The film has been long noted for being the big screen debut of actress Tisca Chopra, and for its representing some of Ajay Devgn's best stunt work when in his early career he was typecast as an action hero. It was an average grosser.

== Soundtrack ==
Lyrics: Sameer

Song	Singer
"Khamoshi Thi Mach Gaya Shor"	Alka Yagnik
"Main Shama Tu Parwana"	Udit Narayan, Alka Yagnik
"Na Pyar Kiye Na Ikraar Kiye"	Udit Narayan, Sadhana Sargam
"Is Baat Ka Bahana"	Kavita Krishnamurthy
"Ek Din Jhagda Ek Din Pyar Achha Lagta Hai"	Kumar Sanu, Sadhana Sargam
"Duniya Di Tha Tha Tha"	Arun Bakshi
