= Adharm (1992 film) =

Adharm अधर्म
- Film poster
- Directed by: Aziz Sejawal
- Written by: Javed Siddiqui
- Story by: Talukdars
- Produced by: Nitin Manmohan
- Starring: Shatrughan Sinha; Shabana Azmi; Sanjay Dutt; Anita Raj
- Cinematography: Arvind Laad
- Edited by: A Muthu
- Music by: Anand–Milind
- Production company: Neha Arts
- Release date: 21 February 1992
- Country: India
- Language: Hindi

Adharm (transl. : Unrighteousness) is a 1992 Bollywood action drama film directed by Aziz Sejawal and produced by Nitin Manmohan. The film stars an ensemble cast. The story was written by Javed Siddiqui. The Film was hit at box-office.The song "Tuna Tuna" was huge hit and contributed to the success of the film

== Cast ==
- Shatrughan Sinha as Avinash Verma
- Shabana Azmi as Mamta Verma
- Sanjay Dutt as Vicky Verma
- Anita Raj as Sara D'Souza
- Shakti Kapoor as Makhan Singh
- Gulshan Grover as Rocky Verma
- Paresh Rawal as Raghunath Verma
- Kiran Kumar as Jagannath 'Jagan' Verma
- Asrani as Khairatilal
- Avtar Gill as Inspector D'Souza
- Vikram Gokhale as Mr. Verma
- Mac Mohan as Rafiq
- Rakesh Pandey as Bharat Verma
- Tej Sapru as Pratap Verma

== Music ==
The music of the film is composed by Anand–Milind and lyrics are penned by Sameer.

#	Title	Singer(s)
1	"Barsa Barsa"	Alka Yagnik, Mohammed Aziz
2	"Geet Banke Labon Pe"	Anuradha Paudwal, Pankaj Udhas
3	"Geet Banke Labon Pe" (Sad)	Anuradha Paudwal
4	"Jalti Huyee Chingari"	Anuradha Paudwal
5	"Tere Mere Sapnon Ka Ghar"	Anuradha Paudwal
6	"Tuna Tuna Tuk Tuk Tuna"	Amit Kumar, Arun Bakshi
7	"Ek Baar To Kah De Tu"	Mohammad Aziz, Anuradha Paudwal
