= Anuradha (2014 film) =

- Movie Poster
- Directed by: Raju Mavani
- Screenplay by: Raju Mavani
- Starring: Disha Chaudhary; Sachin Khedekar; Manoj Joshi; Hrishitaa Bhatt; Smita Jaykar; Kishori Shahane
- Release date: 28 February 2014
- Country: India
- Language: Hindi

Anuradha is a 2014 Bollywood drama film directed by Raju Mavani starring Disha Chaudhary, Sachin Khedekar, Manoj Joshi, Hrishitaa Bhatt, Smita Jaykar, and Kishori Shahane in lead roles. The film was released in India on 28 February 2014.

== Plot ==
The difficulties faced by Anuradha (Disha) in marrying Avinash, the son of her father's friend, and personal tragedy in the form of her mother's death. Labeled as a loose woman by society, Anuradha is forced to face society; how she overcomes her trouble and proves her mettle forms the story.

== Cast ==
- Disha Choudhary as Anuradha
- Rahul Jain as Avinash
- Manoj Joshi as Rudra
- Sachin Khedekar as Masterjee
- Kishori Shahane as Masterjee's Second wife
- Raju Mavani
- Hrishitaa Bhatt
- Smita Jaykar

== Soundtrack ==
The music was composed by Farzan Faaiz and released by Shiv Shakti Entertainment Production. All lyrics were written by Faaiz Anwar.

Anuradha

Soundtrack album by Farzan Faaiz
- Released: Jan 28, 2014
- Recorded: 2014
- Genre: Soundtrack
- Length: 31:57
- Label: Shiv Shakti Entertainment Production
- Producer: Farzan Faaiz

Farzan Faaiz chronology
Anuradha (2014)	Munde Kamaal De (20155)

Track list
No.	Title	Singer(s)	Length
1.	"Ishq Tera Ishq Tera"	Altamash Faridi, Palak Muchhal	5:33
2.	"Bahot Yaad Aata Hai"	Altamash Faridi	7:05
3.	"Bas Yeh Dua Ha"	Altamash Faridi, Ruprekha Banerjee	4:59
4.	"Muskurane Ke Bahane"	Kavita Krishnamurthy	7:04
5.	"Bahot Yaad Aata Hai" (Unplugged Version)	Altamash Faridi	7:16
Total length:			31:57

== Critical reception ==
Anuradha received poor reviews from Indian film critics. Writing for the Times of India, Renuka Vyavahare gave the film 1.5 stars out of a possible 5. Vyavahare wrote, "You don’t identify or sympathise with the lead character or her dilemmas and there lies the film’s failure."

== Box office ==
The film opened to 5% response in theatres and collected 1 lakh (100,000) rupees on its first day. Box Office India declared the film as Disaster.
