= Vadh (2002 film) =

2002 film

- Directed by: Raj Bharat
- Written by: Dilip Dhanwani; Hriday Lani
- Produced by: Dilip Dhanwani
- Starring: Nana Patekar; Puru Raaj Kumar
- Cinematography: Peter Pereira
- Edited by: K. Ravi Kumar
- Music by: Vishal–Shekhar; Sanjoy Chowdhury
- Production company: Megastar Films
- Release date: 29 March 2002
- Country: India
- Language: Hindi

Vadh is a 2002 Indian Hindi-language psychological thriller film directed by Raj Bharat starring Nana Patekar. The film was released on 29 March 2002, under the banner of Megastar Films.

== Synopsis ==
Doctor Arjun Singh is a famous psychiatrist lives with his wife Jyoti and brother Vijay. Vijay is Police Officer loves Deepa. One rainy night a serial killer escapes from Arjun's hospital and the whole city is under threat. But no one is able to capture the killer. After the series of murder of young ladies, Vijay suspects one womanizer Aryan. Aryan is the best friend of Dr. Arjun.

== Cast ==
- Nana Patekar as Dr. Arjun Singh
- Anupama Verma as Jyoti
- Puru Raaj Kumar as Aryan
- Nakul Vaid as Inspector Vijay Singh
- Meghna Kothari as Deepa, Vijay's girlfriend
- Raju Mavani
- Shweta Menon
- Arun Bakshi as Deepa's father
- Sambhavna Sheth

== Soundtrack ==
The music was composed by Vishal–Shekhar.

No	Title	Singers
1	"Hath Phirade"	Sunidhi Chauhan
2	"Vadh"	Sunidhi Chauhan
3	"Aankh Ladale"	Sunidhi Chauhan
4	"Aayega Koi Aayega"	Shankar Mahadevan Sunidhi Chauhan, Sapna Awasthi
5	"Tere Bina"	Sunidhi Chauhan
6	"Bahut Khoobsurat"	Jagjit Singh

== Reception ==
Taran Adarsh of IndiaFM gave the film two stars out of five, writing, ″On the whole, VADH is an engrossing murder mystery that should be appreciated by those who love films of this genre. However, the film needs to be promoted aggressively in order to carve a niche for itself in the face of heavy competition from other big releases.″

The film was unsuccessful at the box office.
