= Iski Topi Uske Sarr =

- Directed by: Raju Mavani
- Produced by: Nitin Mavani
- Starring: Sharad Kapoor; Mukul Dev; Divya Dutta
- Edited by: A. Muthu
- Music by: Anu Malik
- Distributed by: Deepak Arts
- Release date: 17 July 1998
- Country: India
- Language: Hindi

Iski Topi Uske Sarr (transl. My Hat, Your Head) is a 1998 Indian Hindi-language action comedy film directed by Raju Mavani and produced by Nitin Mavani. The film stars Sharad Kapoor, Mukul Dev and Divya Dutta.

== Cast ==
- Sharad Kapoor as Jai Malhotra
- Mukul Dev as Raj
- Divya Dutta as Milli
- Aruna Irani as Gayetri
- Johnny Lever as Gabbar Singh / Mogamba / John Lobo
- Sudhir as Joseph
- Sunny Deol as Bhangra dancer (cameo appearance)
- Razak Khan as Akubhai Pakuli
- Prem Chopra as Udham Singh
- Arun Bakshi as Mohamed
- Tina as Radha
- Rubina as Barkha

== Soundtrack ==
Iski Topi Uske Sarr

Soundtrack album by Anu Malik
- Released: 1997
- Genre: Feature film soundtrack
- Label: Pen Audio

The soundtrack was composed by Anu Malik.

#	Title	Singer(s)	Lyricist(s)
1	"Pagal Tujhe Main Kardon"	Kumar Sanu	Faaiz Anwar
2	"O Dupatte Se Tere"	Udit Narayan, Anuradha Paudwal	Rani Malik
3	"Punjabi Punjabi"	Anu Malik, Jaswinder	Dev Kohli
4	"Sabhi Ko Dualat Ka"	Vinod Rathod, Anu Malik	Shyam Anuragi
5	"Oye Oye Oye"	Suchitra Krishnamurthy	Pandit Visheshwar Sharma
6	"Pehli Baar Mil Ke"	Abhijeet, Alka Yagnik	Faaiz Anwar
