= Ashim Samanta =

Indian director

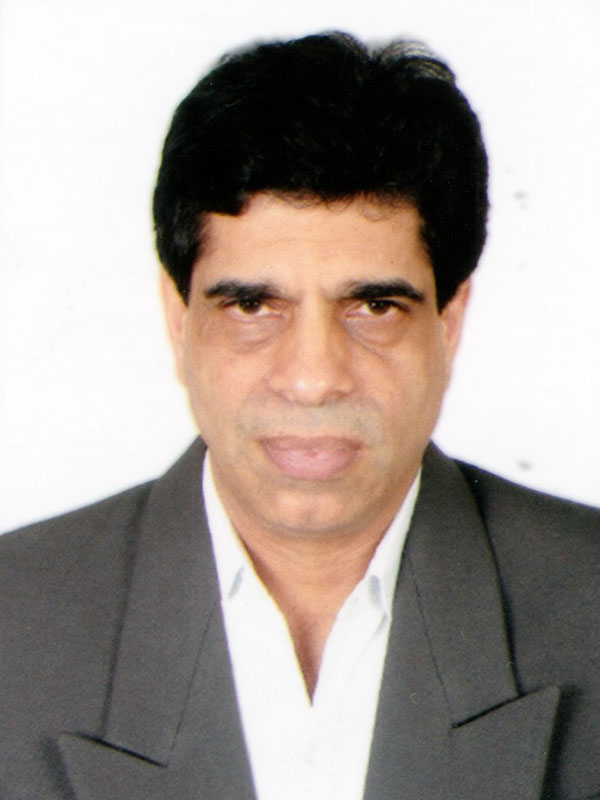
- Ashim Samanta
- Born: Mumbai, India
- Occupation: Indian Film Director

Ashim Samanta is an Indian film and television director and producer, and the son of film director and Shakti Films founder Shakti Samanta.

Shortly after receiving his bachelor's degree in commerce from Bombay University in 1976, Samanta started his career in India's film industry as assistant director to Brij Sadanah on Bombay 405 Miles. In 1982, he directed his first film, Aamne Samne. He has directed several films since then. He also directed the 52-episode sitcom Dil Vil Pyar Vyar for Sony TV in 1999.

In 2005, he started working on Antariksh – Ek Amar Katha, a science fiction series for Star Plus.

== Filmography ==
- Amne Samne (1982)
- Main Awara Hoon (1983)
- Palay Khan (1986)
- Aakhri Baazi (1989)
- Mastan (Bengali) (1989)
- Ahankaar (1995)
- Ankhon Mein Tum Ho (1997)
- Achena Atithi (Bengali) (1997)
- Dil Vil Pyar Vyar (TV Series) (1999)
- Durga (TV Series) (2002)
- Kalchakra (TV Series) (2004)
- Antariksh – Ek Amar Katha (TV Series) (2006)
- Don Muthu Swami (2008)
- Yeh Jo Mohabbat Hai (2012)
