= Saiyaara =

Saiyaara (lit. 'planet' or 'wanderer') may refer to:

- Saiyaara (film), a 2025 Indian Hindi language film by Mohit Suri
  - Saiyaara (soundtrack), its soundtrack album
    - "Saiyaara" (song), the title track of the film by Tanishk Bagchi, Faheem Abdullah and Arslan Nizami
- "Saiyaara", a Hindi-language song by Sohail Sen, Mohit Chauhan and Tarannum Malik from the 2012 Indian film Ek Tha Tiger
