= Lal Salaam (2002 film) =

2002 Hindi film

- DVD Cover
- Directed by: Gaganvihari Borate
- Written by: Arshad Jamal; Suresh Dwadeshiwar
- Produced by: Sanjeev Karambelkar
- Starring: Nandita Das; Sharad Kapoor; Rajpal Yadav; Makarand Deshpande; Vijay Raaz; Sayaji Shinde
- Cinematography: Debu Deodhar
- Edited by: Bibhuti Bhushan
- Music by: Hridaynath Mangeshkar; Uday Mazumdar
- Distributed by: Universal
- Release date: 3 May 2002
- Running time: 90 Mins
- Language: Hindi

Lal Salaam (trans: Red Salute) is a 2002 Indian Hindi-language action drama film directed by Gaganvihari Borate starring Nandita Das, Sharad Kapoor and Sayaji Shinde. The film was released on 3 May 2002.

== Cast ==
- Nandita Das as Rupi
- Sharad Kapoor as Kanna
- Makarand Deshpande as Rajayya
- Vijay Raaz as Ghisu
- Rajpal Yadav as Dhattu
- Akhilendra Mishra as Rathod
- Sayaji Shinde as Inspector G.C. Deshpande
- Vishwajeet Pradhan as Police Inspector
- Anant Jog
- Hemangini as Mainee
- Susheel Johari
- Prithvi Singh

== Soundtrack ==
The music of the film was composed by Hridaynath Mangeshkar. All songs are written by Gulzar.

Lal Salaam

Soundtrack album by Hridaynath Mangeshkar, Uday Mazumdar
- Released: 2002
- Genre: Feature film soundtrack
- Language: Hindi
- Label: Universal

Track listing
No.	Title	Singer(s)	Length
1.	"Beeta Mausam"	Lata Mangeshkar	04:42
2.	"Chand Gufa Mein"	Lata Mangeshkar	03:09
3.	"Hunkar Jaga"		04:45
4.	"Mitwa Lai Jaiyyo"		04:37
5.	"Tum Aasha Vishwas Hamare"	Lata Mangeshkar	05:41
6.	"Zara Sa Aao Na"	Ravindra Sathe, Roop Kumar Rathod	03:09
