= Raj Bharat =

Indian film director

Raj Bharat is an Indian film director who primarily worked in Telugu and Tamil Movies. His notable films include Yamakinkarudu and Puli, both starring Chiranjeevi.

== Filmography ==
- Yamakinkarudu (1982)
- Puli (1985)
- Vadh (2002) (Hindi film)

1981 RUDRA THANDAVAM ( TELUGU MOVIE)
