= Shivdasani =

Shivdasani is a Sindhi surname. It means followers of Hindu god Shiva. It refers to:

- Aftab Shivdasani (born 1978), Indian actor
- Babita Shivdasani (born 1947), Indian actress
- Deepak Shivdasani (fl. 1982–2017), Indian film director and producer of Bollywood
- Hari Shivdasani (1909–1994), Indian character actor
- Jaggy Shivdasani (born 1958), Indian bridge player
- Menka Shivdasani
- Nina Shivdasani
- Sadhana Shivdasani (1941–2015), Indian actress
