= Faaiz Anwar =

Indian poet and lyricist

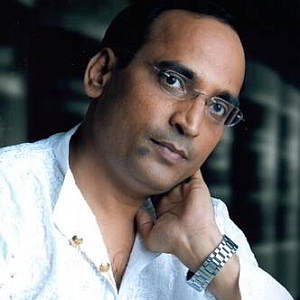
- Born: 9 March 1965 (age 61); Kanpur
- Occupations: Lyricist, poet
- Writing career
- Years active: 1989–present
- Genre: Bollywood
- Subjects: Love, philosophy

Faaiz Anwar (born 9 March 1965) is an Indian poet and lyricist who has written songs for popular movies including Dil Hai Ke Manta Nahin, Saajan, Tum Bin, Jab We Met, Dabangg, and Rowdy Rathore.

== Career ==
Anwar entered the Hindi music industry by chance. In 1989, on a sightseeing visit to Bombay, he happened to meet Roop Kumar Rathod. Impressed by his Shayri, Roop Kumar Rathore introduced him to Mahesh Bhatt. And, Mahesh Bhatt was so impressed by his Shayari that he asked to join the Film Industry and even promised to give the break. And Mahesh Bhatt kept his promise. Mahesh Bhatt was working on a subject and had the music ready for a song but wanted Shayri with a touch of sensibility and human feel. He tried many established lyricists but they could not satiate Mahesh Bhatt's demanding soul. He asked Faaiz Anwaar to write lyrics. In 40 min. what Faaiz Anwaar wrote, went to become musical milestone of Music Industry. This was the title song "Dil Hai Ke Manta Nahin" which stayed on the top of the most popular Radio Programme Cibaca Geetmala for almost two years. Soon, followed musical hit film of the year "Imtihaan" and Saajan” which consolidated his place in the Film Industry. He was nominated for Best Lyricist for his debut song "Dil Hai Ke Maanta Nahi" (Film: Dil Hai Ke Maanta Nahin), "Is Tarah Aashiqui Ka Asar... (Film: Imtehan), and "Tere Mast Mast Do Nain" (Film: Dabangg) in Filmfare awards, Zee awards.

== Filmography ==
- Dil Hai Ke Manta Nahin (1991)
- Saajan
- Jaanam
- Aaja Meri Jaan (1993)
- Kasam Teri Kasam (1993)
- Tum Karo Vaada (1993)
- Do Dilon Ka Sangam (1993)
- Shabnam
- Tehquiqat
- Karan (1994)
- Kanoon (1994)
- Vijaypath
- Naaraaz (1994)
- Imtihaan
- Hum Hain Bemisaal
- The Gambler (1995)
- The Don (1995)
- Haqeeqat (1995)
- Surakshaa (1995)
- Hulchul (1995)
- Ram Aur Shyam (1996) (1996)
- Dil Kitna Nadan Hai (1997)
- Iski Topi Uske Sarr
- Aakrosh (1998)
- Humse Badhkar Kaun
- Bade Dilwala (1999)
- Hello Brother (1999)
- Papa The Great (2000)
- Baaghi (2000)
- Tum Bin (2001)
- Yeh Zindagi Ka Safar (2001)
- Pyaasa (2002)
- Gunaah (2002)
- Maine Dil Tujhko Diya
- Khel – No Ordinary Game
- Khwahish
- Koi Mere Dil Mein
- Chand Bujh Gaya
- Saathi
- Zindagi Tere Naam
- Jab We Met (2007)
- Dabangg (2010)
- Rowdy Rathore (2012)
- Yeh Jo Mohabbat Hai
- Anuradha
- Munde Kamaal De
- Love Ke Funday
- Tum Bin II (2016)
- Ek Haseena Thi Ek Deewana Tha (2017)
- Veerey Ki Wedding (2018)

== Albums ==
| Album | Singer | Music Director |
| I Love You | Udit Narayan | Sandesh Shandilya |
| Deewana (album) | Sonu Nigam | Sajid–Wajid |
| Jaan (album) | Sonu Nigam | Nikhil Vinay |
| Yaad | Sonu Nigam | Nikhil Vinay |
| Oh My Love | Sadhana Sargam | Sandesh Shandilya |
| Jaanam | Udit Narayan | Nikhil Vinay |
| Aashiqui | Abhijeet Bhattacharya | Nikhil Vinay |
| Ishq Hua | Anuradha Paudwal | Nikhil Vinay |
| Love Is Life | Udit Narayan | Anand–Milind |
| Sochta Hun | Babul Supriyo | |
| Tujhse Pyar Hai | P.Balram and Sadhna Sargam | Sayeed Ali |
| Teri Kuch Yaadein | Shael | Milind Sagar |
| Maah-E-Ru | Jojo | Prakash-Ashish |
| Sitara | Vibhav Krishna | Prakash-Ashish |

== Accolades ==
| Year | Award Ceremony | Category | Film | Song | Result | Reference(s) |
|---|---|---|---|---|---|---|
| 2010 | Mirchi Music Awards | Album of The Year | Dabangg | - | Won | |
| 2010 | Mirchi Music Awards | Lyricist of The Year | Dabangg | "Tere Mast Mast Do Nain" | Nominated | |
