= Surakshaa (1995 film) =

- Release poster
- Directed by: Raju Mavani
- Written by: Taluk Daars
- Produced by: Raju Mavani
- Starring: Aditya Pancholi; Sunil Shetty; Saif Ali Khan; Monica Bedi; Divya Dutta; Sheeba Agarwal
- Cinematography: Sanjay Malvankar
- Edited by: A. Muthu
- Music by: Anu Malik
- Release date: 3 March 1995
- Running time: 148 mins
- Country: India
- Language: Hindi

Surakshaa (transl.: Protection) is a 1995 Indian Hindi-language action comedy film directed and produced by Raju Mavani. The film stars Aditya Pancholi, Sunil Shetty, Saif Ali Khan, Divya Dutta, Sheeba Agarwal and debutant Monica Bedi.

== Plot ==
Suraj is a small-time goon who also does good for people and lives with his girlfriend Diana, trying to make a living by working against criminals, thus making him an enemy of underworld don Dhanraj. Raja is another small-time, good-hearted goon who does what he wants without any regard for cops or criminals, thus falling into Dhanraj's bad books too. And Dhanraj's arch-rival is Jagtap. News one day reaches them that a millionaire Laxman Singh's niece, Kiran is coming from the U.S. and has a ring worth 2.5 million. It is also known that Prince Vijay, nephew of Laxman Singh's closest friend Vikram Singh, is coming from London to marry Kiran.

The criminals soon plot to kidnap Kiran and get the ring as well as money from her. Jagtap approaches Raja, who is otherwise uninterested in this, and offers him 5 million to kidnap Kiran for him, promising him that he won't harm her.

The film now moves to Kiran's hotel, where Amar is seen joining as a waiter, much to the irritation of the comical hotel manager. Raja manages to impress Kiran on her way to the hotel and get a room, and Kiran sees Amar at the hotel and gets highly impressed with his looks. Suraj, in the meantime, captures prince Vijay and goes as an impostor to Kiran's hotel himself. Everyone but Amar and Raja thinks that Amar and Suraj is an Real Prince Vijay.

As time passes, Laxman Singh and Vikram Singh arrive at the hotel, and Suraj is exposed. He then confesses that he had only come to the hotel to steal Kiran's ring, and promises to release the real prince Vijay. Amar helps Suraj escape, and then reveals to Amar and Suraj that he is the real Prince Vijay.

== Cast ==
- Aditya Pancholi as Suraj / Prince Vijay
- Sunil Shetty as Raja
- Saif Ali Khan as Amar / Prince Vijay
- Monica Bedi as Kiran
- Divya Dutta as Bindiya
- Sheeba Agarwal as Diana
- Kader Khan as Hotel Manager
- Tinu Anand as Dhanraj
- Mukesh Rishi as Jagtap
- Arun Bakshi as Laxman Singh
- Achyut Potdar as Vikram Singh

== Soundtrack ==
Anu Malik composed the music while lyrics are penned by Faaiz Anwar.

#	Song	Singer
1.	"O Mere Sanam"	Udit Narayan, Abhijeet, Alisha Chinai
2.	"Masoom Sanam"	Kumar Sanu, Alka Yagnik
3.	"Bam Bam Bam"	Alisha Chinai
4.	"Kaali Aankhon Wali"	Kumar Sanu
5.	"Dil Mein Ho Pyar"	Kumar Sanu, Bela
6.	"Bam Bam Bam"	Udit Narayan
