= Hum Hain Bemisaal =

1994 film by Deepak Bahry

Hum Hain Bemisal
- Release poster
- Directed by: Deepak Bahry
- Written by: Saroj Khan
- Screenplay by: S. Khan
- Produced by: Mrs. Geeta Gupta
- Starring: Akshay Kumar; Suniel Shetty; Shilpa Shirodkar; Madhoo; Pran
- Cinematography: Damodar Naidu
- Music by: Anu Malik
- Production company: Spectrum Pictures Combine
- Release date: 16 December 1994
- Running time: 159 minutes
- Country: India
- Language: Hindi
- Budget: ₹2.50 crore
- Box office: ₹4.15 crore

Hum Hain Bemisal (transl. We Are Unique) is a 1994 Indian action thriller film directed by Deepak Bahry. It stars Akshay Kumar, Suniel Shetty, Shilpa Shirodkar, Madhoo, and actor in lead roles. Film critic Sukanya Verma described it as a "shoddy rip-off" of John Woo's The Killer (1989).

== Plot ==
When ruthless crime lord Tuti Shah kills his associate Kishan to protect his criminal empire, he frames Kishan’s close friend D’Souza for the murder. Wrongfully convicted, D’Souza is sentenced to life in prison, leaving behind his seven-year-old son, Michael. The boy runs away after being shunned by his best friend, Vijay Sinha—Kishan’s son—who now believes Michael’s father is a killer.

Years later, D’Souza is released from prison and learns from a local priest that Michael has never been found. However, in keeping with a promise to his old friend, the priest has used money sent by D’Souza from jail to help raise Vijay, who is now a police inspector. Determined to clear his name and expose Tuti Shah, D’Souza sets out to see Tuti brought to justice.

Meanwhile, Michael (now grown into a streetwise young man) has become a pawn in Tuti Shah’s underworld games. Exploiting Michael’s loyalty to the poor, Tuti manipulates him into killing a rival, Bakshi Jang Bahadur. During the attack, a stray gunshot blinds a hotel dancer named Maria. Wracked with guilt, Michael secretly tends to her and the two fall in love, with Michael vowing to restore her sight.

Tuti once again coerces Michael—offering money for Maria’s eye surgery in exchange for assassinating Inspector Dharam Das. But the deal is a trap, and Michael finds himself hunted by Inspector Vijay, who is pursuing him for both murders while also aiming to bring down Tuti Shah.

Vijay’s own life takes a turn when he falls for a spirited pickpocket named Meena. His pursuit of Tuti, however, is frustrated by legal loopholes, prompting him to resign from the police and take matters into his own hands.

In the explosive final showdown, D’Souza, Michael, and Vijay join forces against Tuti Shah and his private army. The trio defeats the crime lord, but a bomb threatens Maria’s life. Michael rushes to save her and succeeds, but is fatally injured in the blast. In his dying moments, he asks that his eyes be donated to Maria so she can see the world again.

The film closes with Maria’s surgery a success. Now able to see, she envisions Michael before her—his sacrifice forever etched in her heart.

== Cast ==
- Akshay Kumar as Vijay Sinha, son of Kishen Sinha.
- Suniel Shetty as Michael D'Souza, son of D'Souza.
- Shilpa Shirodkar as Didi
- Madhoo as Maria
- Pran as Mr D'Souza, father of Michael D'Souza.
- Iqbal khan as Kishen Sinha, father of Vijay Sinha.
- Rami Reddy as Tuti Shah
- Avtar Gill as Kaliya
- Kunickaa Sadanand as Tuti Shah's girl
- Jagdeep as Police constable
- Arun Bakshi as Bakshi
- Vikas Anand as Church Priest / Church Father
- Gavin Packard as Teju
- Ram Sethi as Hotel Owner

== Soundtrack ==
#	Title	Singer(s)	Lyricist
1	"Tujhse Kya Chori Hai"	Kumar Sanu, Sadhana Sargam, Suniel Shetty, Madhoo	Qateel Shifai
2	"Chahe Choodi Toot Jaaye"	Alka Yagnik	Shyam Anuragi, Kulwant Jani
3	"Mera Lehenga Gher Ghumer"	Sapna Awasthi	Sanam Gazipuri
4	"Chori Chori Chori"	Anu Malik, Alisha Chinai	Faiz Anwar
5	"Qatil Aankhon Wale"	Alisha Chinai	Qateel Shifai
6	"Duma Dum Mast Kalandar"	Baba Sehgal, Alka Yagnik	Baba Sehgal, Qateel Shifai
