= Ankhon Mein Tum Ho =

- Theatrical poster
- Directed by: Ashim Samanta
- Written by: Shabd Kumar
- Screenplay by: Shaktipada Rajguru
- Produced by: Shakti Samanta
- Starring: Sharad Kapoor; Suman Ranganathan; Rohit Roy
- Cinematography: Gautam Biswas (W.I.G.A)
- Music by: Anu Malik
- Production company: Anuradha Films
- Release date: 26 December 1997
- Running time: 151 minutes
- Country: India
- Languages: Hindi; Bengali

Ankhon Mein Tum Ho (transl. You reside in my eyes) is a 1997 Indian romantic thriller film directed by Ashim Samanta and produced by Shakti Samanta. It was simultaneously shot in Hindi and Bengali, with the latter version titled Achena Atithi (transl. Stranger). The film stars Sharad Kapoor, Suman Ranganathan and Rohit Roy in lead roles. The film revolves around the frustrated love story of Prem Kapoor (Rohit Roy) and Pooja (Suman Ranganathan), because she is destined to kill her beau according to the stars.

The film is today best remembered as Ashok Kumar's last film.

== Plot ==
This story is about Prem, Pooja, Pratap, and Ranjit. Prem loves Pooja very much and wants to marry her. But Prem's family astrologer says that if Pooja marries Prem, then Prem will meet with an untimely death. Prem's grandfather does not support the marriage. He tells Pooja everything and orders her to leave Prem forever. Pooja leaves Prem and marries Pratap. Pratap is a famous businessman, and he loves Pooja very much. Ranima, Pratap's mother, has cardiac problems and dotes on Pooja. During their honeymoon in Switzerland, Pratap dies in an accident. Pooja doesn't reveal the news to Ranima. One day during Durga Pooja, Pooja suddenly sees Pratap, who in reality is an imposter - Ranjit. Ranjit kills Ranima, and when Pooja sees the incident, she shoots at Ranjit, but unfortunately, the bullet goes into Mamababu's chest, and he succumbs. Ranjit calls the police and tells them that Pooja has killed Ranima and Mamababu. The police arrest Pooja. Prem fights the case for Pooja, and in court, Prem proves that Ranjit is the murderer. Then the police arrest Ranjit while Prem and Pooja ring the wedding bells.

== Cast ==
- Ashok Kumar as Kapoor
- Raakhee as Ranimaa
- Rohit Roy as Prem
- Sharad Kapoor as Pratap Burman/ Ranjeet
- Suman Ranganathan as Pooja
- Satyen Kappu as Public Prosecutor Gupta
- Ram Mohan as Doctor
- Pramod Muthu as Mohan

== Soundtrack ==
Music composed by Anu Malik and lyrics by Anand Bakshi.

#	Title	Singer(s)	Duration
1.	"Har Ek Muskurahat"	Alka Yagnik	5:42
2.	"Aankhon Mein Tum Ho"	Kumar Sanu, Alka Yagnik	4:55
3.	"Hum Kahe Na Kahe"	Kumar Sanu, Anuradha Paudwal	6:57
4.	"Maine Sawan Se Kaha"	Kumar Sanu	5:50
5.	"Meri Aankhon Mein"	Anuradha Paudwal	5:29
6.	"Sab Kahte Hai"	Anuradha Paudwal	5:13

Bengali tracklist

#	Title	Singer(s)	Duration
1	"Balo Ki Je Holo"	Kumar Sanu	5:50
2	"Khusir Onek Range"	Alka Yagnik	5:42
3	"Ami Boli Na Boli"	Kumar Sanu, Anuradha Paudwal	6:57
4	"Sune hashi or chhute giye"	Anuradha Paudwal	5:29
5	"Sabar Mukhe Shuni"	Anuradha Paudwal	5:13
6	"Premeri Sur Kare Goon Goon"	Kumar Sanu, Alka Yagnik	4:55
