= Hitesh =

Hitesh (Hindi: हितेश) is a common Hindu masculine given name. The name literally means "one who thinks well of everyone." or "Lord of goodness." Hitesh हितेश in Hindi means Subh Chintak सुभ चिन्तक or well wisher. The name itself suggests the meaning in Hindi, i.e., "Hit" हित means to do and thinks good for others and "esh" ईश means ishwar or God.

People named Hitesh include:

- Hitesh Basumatary, politician
- Hitesh Bharadwaj (born 1991) – Indian television actor, model, anchor, RJ and poet
- Hitesh Ceon (born 1974) – Icelandic songwriter, producer and composer
- Hitesh Hira (born 1965), Zimbabwean cricketer
- Hitesh Kadam (born 1988) – Indian cricketer
- Hitesh Kumar Bagartti – Indian politician
- Hitesh Kumari – female Indian politician
- Hitesh Modak – Indian music composer, arranger and producer
- Hitesh Modi (born 1971) – Kenyan cricketer
- Hitesh Sharma (born 1997) – Indian footballer
- Hitesh Sharma (born 1968) – retired Indian cricketer
- Hitesh Solanki (born 1991) – Indian cricketer
