= Don Muthu Swami =

- Directed by: Ashim Samanta
- Written by: Salim Agha
- Based on: Oscar by Claude Magnier
- Produced by: Ashim Samanta; Shakti Samanta
- Starring: Mithun Chakraborty; Hrishita Bhatt; Shakti Kapoor; Rohit Roy; Dolly Minhas; Rakesh Bedi
- Cinematography: Harish Joshi
- Edited by: Shree Narayan Singh
- Music by: Anu Malik
- Distributed by: Venus Films
- Release date: 23 May 2008
- Running time: 114 minutes
- Country: India
- Language: Hindi

Don Muthu Swami is a 2008 Indian Hindi-language comedy-drama film directed by Ashim Samanta starring Mithun Chakraborty as the Don. The film is a remake of the 1991 American film Oscar, which itself was a remake of the 1967 French film Oscar.

== Songs ==
1. "Pyaar Do Pyaar Lo" - Kishore Kumar, Anand Kumar C.
2. "I Am A Disco Dancer (New)" - Vijay Benedict
3. "I Love You I Love You" - Deepali Kishore, Emon Chatterjee
4. "Jeena Bhi Kya" - Salma Agha, Bappi Lahiri
5. "Jhoom Le Jhoom Le" - Anu Malik
6. "Jimmy Aaja" - Parvati Khan
7. "Saath Saath Tum Chalo" - Asha Bhosle, Bhupinder Singh
8. "Tum Kaun Ho" - Shaan, Mahalaxmi Iyer

== Cast ==
- Mithun Chakraborty as Don Muthu Swami
- Hrishitaa Bhatt as Sanjana
- Shakti Kapoor as Noora
- Rohit Roy as Preetam
- Mohit Raina As Jaikishan
- Dolly Minhas as Lata
- Dilip Joshi as Fikarchand
- Rakesh Bedi as Shikharchand
- Meghna Malik as Savitri
- Ali Asgar as Rehman
- Viju Khote as Usmaan
- Ashwin Kaushal as Salim
- Achyut Potdar as Ishwar
- Birbal as Pundit
- Upasna Singh as Barkha
- Ali Razak as Commissioner
- Yusuf Hussain as Chit Fund1
- Vishal Kotian as Veeru
- Sonia Kapoor as Guleri
- Aroon Bakshi as Phatkay
- Mithalesh as Chit Fund 2
- Anusmriti Sarkar as Ranjana

== Reception ==
The Times of India wrote that "Don Muthuswamy wants to mend his ways and find a suitable boy for his daughter who is ready to run away with a driver. He zeros down on a crook (Rohit Roy), because the other crook he had chosen walks away with his maid instead. But while he's stealing back his jewels, which the crook had stolen from him, his daughter steals away with the Urdu teacher instead. Too complicated, too stretched out, terribly unhinged...The only thing that could lure you is nostalgia: Mithunda ka ishtyle"
