= Imtihaan =

Imtihan
- Theatrical release poster
- Directed by: Harry Baweja
- Screenplay by: Dev Jyoti Roy
- Dialogues by: Shashi Raj
- Story by: C. J. Pavri
- Based on: Hamraaz (1967) by B. R. Chopra
- Produced by: Raju Mavani
- Starring: Sunny Deol; Saif Ali Khan; Raveena Tandon
- Cinematography: Rajan Kinagi
- Edited by: A. Muthu
- Music by: Anu Malik
- Production company: Jay Raj Production
- Distributed by: Tips Industries
- Release date: 11 March 1994
- Country: India
- Language: Hindi

Imtihan (translation: Trial) is a 1994 Indian Hindi-language action romance film directed by Harry Baweja, starring Sunny Deol, Saif Ali Khan and Raveena Tandon. The film was remade in Telugu as Prema Prayanam (1996).

== Plot ==
Vicky (Saif Ali Khan) is a popular singer, who meets and falls in love with Preeti (Raveena Tandon). He asks permission to marry her from her father, who instantly approves of him. Preeti is reluctant to get married but her father falls ill and agrees for her father's sake. Soon, her father falls He makes her promise that she will not tell Vicky about her past life.

A few years earlier, Preeti had fallen in love with and married Raja (Sunny Deol) against her father's wishes. Though the two were very happy together, they were cruelly separated when Raja is presumed dead after being captured by a gang in revenge for beating up Gulshan, but falls into a river below.

Preeti’s father falls ill again. He tells the reason he is ill is because he has been hiding a secret: Preeti gave birth to a daughter; however, her father lied to her and said the baby died. Instead he sent the baby to an orphanage and tells her where. He then passes away. A mysterious figure overhears this conversation.

After marrying Vicky, Preeti is quite happy with him. She meets her daughter, Pinky, in the orphanage, and decides to legally adopt her. Vicky, who does not know about Preeti's connection to Pinky, opposes the adoption because he looks forward to having his own children some day. Preeti continues to meet Pinky. However, a mysterious stranger also contacts Preeti. She starts to receive phone calls from someone, and repeatedly lies to Vicky regarding her whereabouts. Convinced that Preeti is having an extramarital affair, Vicky follows her. It turns out she is being called by Raja, her first husband. Raja tells Vicky about their past and that Gulshan has kidnapped Pinky because she has witnessed him commit another murder and is with Gulshan's father. Raja has managed to capture Gulshan and agreed to exchange him with Pinky. Vicky agrees to help Raja. Raja and Vicky fight Gulshan and his henchmen. Finally Raja kills Gulshan but gets fatally injured. He hands over Pinky's responsibility to Vicky and Preeti and then dies peacefully.

== Cast ==
- Sunny Deol as Raja – Preeti's boyfriend, Pinky's father.
- Saif Ali Khan as Vicky – Preeti's eventual husband.
- Raveena Tandon as Preeti – Raja’s girlfriend, Pinky's mother, eventually Vicky’s wife
- Shakti Kapoor as Shekhar
- Dalip Tahil as Dindayal Khanna, Preeti’s father.
- Gulshan Grover as Gulshan
- Mohan Joshi as K.K
- Baby Ghazala as Pinky, Raja and Preeti’s daughter.
- Asrani as Nandu
- Avtar Gill as Dr. Ankit Pandey
- Shammi as Kanta, Orphanage's manager
- Anil Nagrath as Ishwarchand
- Brij Gopal as Police Inspector Manish

== Music and soundtrack ==
The film’s music was composed by Anu Malik and the lyrics of the songs were penned by Faaiz Anwar.

The soundtrack was very popular, most popular songs in album "Is Tarah Aashiqui Ka", "Do Baatein Ho Sakti Hai", "Chaaha Toh Bahut etc. According to the Indian trade website Box Office India, with around 2,800,000 units sold the soundtrack became the ninth highest-selling album of the year.

Vocals for Sunny Deol were performed by Amit Kumar, for Saif Ali Khan by Kumar Sanu and Vinod Rathod, and for Raveena Tandon by Alka Yagnik and Bela Sulakhe.

No.	Title	Singer(s)	Length
1.	"Is Tarah Aashiqui Ka" (1)	Kumar Sanu	7:22
2.	"Chaaha Toh Bahut"	Kumar Sanu & Bela Sulakhe	7:01
3.	"Do Baatein Ho Sakti Hai"	Kumar Sanu	7:51
4.	"Choodake Daman"	Kumar Sanu & Alka Yagnik	9:06
5.	"Is Tarah Aashiqui Ka" (2)	Amit Kumar	7:25
6.	"Dheere Dheere Chori Chori"	Amit Kumar & Alka Yagnik	6:59
7.	"Ek Yaad Ke Sahare"	Vinod Rathod	8:16
8.	"Pyar Hoga Pyar Hoga"	Vinod Rathod	7:02
Total length:			01:02:48
