= Ilene Hamann =

South African actress and model

- Born: 9 June 1984 (age 41); Jeffreys Bay
- Occupation: Actress . Model
- Notable work: Rog

Ilene Hamann (born 9 June 1984) is a South African actress and model.

== Early life ==
Ilene Hamann was born in Jeffreys Bay, where she lived until she moved to Cape Town, South Africa. Her mother is of Portuguese descent and her father of Dutch descent. Hamann started her career with photography, which earned her several modeling offers, which she pursued.

Hamann attended Nico Malan High School, and Matriculated with a B aggregate. After her matriculation, she went to Stellenbosch Academy of Design and Photography, where she completed her first year in photography but had to give up her studies due to the amount of modeling work she was receiving.

== Career ==
=== Film ===
In 2004, she was discovered on the cover of a magazine by the Indian film producer Pooja Bhatt and cast for her new Bollywood movie Rog, where Hamann eventually played the female lead role of supermodel Maya Solomon alongside Irrfan Khan. She was the first South African to be cast in such a leading role. As she did not speak any Hindi, she took language lessons.

The movie was a financial failure and was also criticised for its weak content. The Indian news portal Rediff.com criticised Hamann for appearing in the film as 'an exotic beauty (...) willing to drop her clothes'.

The for Indian society relatively revealing portrayals were the subject of controversy. In 2013, the Indian film portal Filmibeat listed one of the film posters, in which Hamann posed in a net bikini on her knees, as one of the most controversial film posters in Bollywood history.

Rediff.com included Hamann in a list of actresses who became overnight sex symbols and pin-up girls in India through the films of Mahesh and Pooja Bhatt. In addition to Hamann, the list includes actresses such as Bipasha Basu, Jacqueline Fernandez, Udita Goswami, Esha Gupta, Sunny Leone, Lisa Ray, Mallika Sherawat and Preity Zinta.

In contrast to these, Ilene Hamann did not start a film acting career, Rog remained her only film.

== Filmography ==
Year	Title	Role	Notes
2005	Rog	Maya Solomon	Bollywood film debut
