= Himanshu Malik =

Indian actor and model

- Born: Sonipat, Haryana, India
- Occupation: Actor
- Years active: 1996–present

Himanshu Malik is an Indian actor, screenwriter and producer known for his works in Bollywood. He started his acting career with the film, Kama Sutra: A Tale of Love (1996) and gained recognition with his portrayal of Abhigyan, a wealthy Canadian industrialist in the 2001 romance Tum Bin. His other notable work includes Jungle (2000), Khwahish (2003) and Rog (2005). His first film as a writer, director and producer, Chitrakut was released on 20 May 2022.

== Career ==
Himanshu began his career in music videos; most notable among them was Nusrat Fateh Ali Khan's Afreen Afreen with Lisa Ray. He later appeared in Sonu Nigam's Deewane Hoke Hum with Sandali Sinha.

He made his film debut with a role in Mira Nair's Kama Sutra: A Tale of Love (1996) and also appeared in Ram Gopal Varma's Jungle in 2000. However, his big break came as a supporting actor in Tum Bin (2001), leading to work in several small films. His next feature was Khwahish (2003), playing the lead opposite Mallika Sherawat, notable for its sensuality and kissing scenes.

In 2012, he wrote and directed short film Q.E.D.. He made his feature film directorial debut with Chitrakut in 2022.

== Personal life ==
Malik is married to Komal and the couple has a daughter, Athena.

In 2022, he revealed in an interview with Navbharat Times that, during his early days in the film industry, he was propositioned to stay in the news, and that the incident left him shocked.

== Filmography ==
| Year | Film name | Role | Other notes |
|---|---|---|---|
| 1996 | Kama Sutra: A Tale of Love | Young Merchant | |
| 2000 | Jungle | Pawan | |
| 2001 | Tum Bin | Abhigyan | |
| 2003 | Khwahish | Amar Ranawat | |
| 2003 | LOC Kargil | Major Vivek Gupta | |
| 2004 | Rakht | Abhigyan Gupta | |
| 2005 | Rog | Ali | |
| 2005 | Rain | Prakash | |
| 2005 | Koi Aap Sa | Vicky | |
| 2007 | Sajni | Singer Kailash | Kannada film |
| 2010 | Mallika | Vikram | |
| 2011 | Yamala Pagla Deewana | Tejinder | |
| 2012 | Q.E.D. | —N/a | short, writer and director |
| 2016 | 7 Hours to Go | | |
| 2018 | 3 Storeys | Policeman Ganpatrao | |
| 2022 | Chitrakut | Head chef | Also writer, director and producer |
| 2024 | Ulajh | Yaseen Mirza | |
| 2024 | Hisaab Barabar | MP | |
| 2026 | Baby Do Die Do | Mukesh Murjhani | |
