= Nupur =

Nupur is a feminine given name and a surname of Indian origin. People with that name include:

== Given name ==
- Nupur Asthana (active from 1998), Indian film director and writer
- Nupur Mehta (born 1980), Indian actress
- Nupur Sharma, Indian politician

== Surname ==
- Alka Nupur (active from 1979 to 1989), Indian actress

== Other uses ==
- Nupur (album), a 2001 album by Zubeen Garg

== See also ==
- Jol Nupur, a Bengali TV series which aired 2013-2015
