= Shilpi Sharma =

Shilpi Sharma may refer to:

- Shilpi Sharma (actress), Indian actress, model and fashion designer
- Shilpi Sharma (DJ), Indian DJ, actress and model
