= Bin Bulaye Baraati =

- Theatrical release poster
- Directed by: Chandrakant Singh
- Screenplay by: Praful Parekh; M.Salim
- Produced by: Dhanraj Jethani, Dhanraj Films
- Starring: Aftab Shivdasani; Priyanka Kothari; Rajpal Yadav; Sanjay Mishra; Om Puri; Vijay Raaz
- Cinematography: Johny Lal
- Edited by: Pranav Dhiwar, pankaj sharma
- Music by: songs: Anand Raj Anand score: Sanjoy Chowdhury
- Distributed by: Dhanraj Films
- Release date: 17 June 2011
- Country: India
- Language: Hindi

Bin Bulaye Baraati is a 2011 Indian action comedy film written by Praful Parekh and M. Salim and directed by Chandrakant Singh. The stars are Aftab Shivdasani, Priyanka Kothari, Rajpal Yadav, Om Puri, Sanjay Mishra, Shakti Kapoor, and Vijay Raaz in lead roles, with Shweta Tiwari featured in a cameo appearance and Mallika Sherawat and Shweta Bhardwaj appearing in song numbers. The film was released in India on 17 June 2011.

== Plot ==
Criminals Hazari (Sanjay Mishra) and Murari (Rajpal Yadav) rob the Police Commissioner's home, and Chetta Singh (Vijay Raaz) steals the car belonging to the Commissioner's wife, Kusum (Rati Agnihotri). Meanwhile, AD (Aftab Shivdasani) elopes with Shreya (Priyanka Kothari), the niece of Police Sub-Inspector Pralay Pratap Singh (Om Puri). With each group on the run for different reasons, they all end up in a vehicle stolen from crime boss Durjan Singh/Black Cobra (Gulshan Grover). In the vehicle is a suitcase filled with Durjan's loot.

On the run from both gangsters and police, they group disguise themselves using fake police uniforms and arrive in Madhavgarh village just in time to stop Loha Singh (Manoj Joshi) from committing a crime. Believing them to be real law officials, the town's residents host a congratulatory feast in their honour. The group settles in comfortably among their new-found friends, but the Black Cobra tracks them down and plots their capture and death.

== Cast ==
- Aftab Shivdasani as AD
- Priyanka Kothari as Shreya
- Shweta Tiwari as Rajjo/Rosie
- Rajpal Yadav as Murari
- Om Puri as Sub Inspector Pralay Pratap Singh
- Ashish Vidyarthi as Jeetu, the dealer.
- Rati Agnihotri as Kusum / Kuki
- Shakti Kapoor as Ajay Prakash
- Gulshan Grover as Durjan Singh / Black Cobra
- Vijay Raaz as Chetta Singh
- Sanjay Mishra as Hazari
- Manoj Joshi as Loha Singh
- Mukesh Tiwari as Gajraj
- Hemant Pandey as Ranjeet
- Johnny Lever as Sajjan Singh / Badi Bi
- Dinesh Lamba as Havaldar
- Rocky Verma as Teeka Singh
- Neeraj Vora as Police Commissioner
- Shweta Keswani as ginni
- Razak Khan as Sajjan's Dance Teacher
- Mallika Sherawat as Shalu in a Special Appearance in Item song "Shalu Ke Thumke"

== Production ==
It was announced February 2011 that Anand Raj Anand would be composing songs for the film. By March 2011 principle filming had commenced. In April 2011, it was released that actress Shweta Tiwari would have a lead role in the film, that she would replace Mallika Sherawat in singing some songs for the film, and that Sherawat would until be in the film, but as a dancer and not a singer. One of Tiwari's song pieces was shot a scene solo with the other actors not present, but the others were added to the scene in post-production.

== Soundtrack ==
Bin Bulaye Baraati

Soundtrack album by Anand Raj Anand
- Released: 2011
- Genre: Film soundtrack
- Label: T-Series

Anand Raj Anand chronology
Chalo Dilli (2011)	Bin Bulaye Baraati (2011)	Double Dhamaal (2011)

No.	Title	Singer(s)	Length
1.	"Shalu Ke Thumke"	Anupama Raag	3:36
2.	"Dil Ka Achar"	Mamta Sharma	3:19
3.	"Kismat"	Ritu Pathak	3:29
4.	"Bin Bulaye Baraati"	Anand Raj Anand	3:06
5.	"Sawan Ka Tha Mahina"	Shaan & Gorisha	3:42

== Reception ==
=== Critical response ===
Mid-Day noted that "with a line-up of seasoned character actors known for their comic timings", the film could have been a "laugh ride", writing that the filmmaker's "felt their mere presence was enough to prop the film" allowing them to work with a "meandering script" that jumped "from one character to another" in a manner "bound to test the audience's patience". They also chided the inane dialogues and referred to the film as "balderdash", and a "no-brainer... ...made purely for the 'aam janata' of the hinterland".
