= Aabra Ka Daabra =

- Directed by: Dheeraj Kumar
- Written by: Raghuveer Shekhawat (dialogues)
- Story by: J. K. Nirmal; Iqbal Katchi
- Produced by: Zuby Kochhar
- Starring: Athit Naik; Satish Kaushik; Hansika Motwani; Nupur Mehta
- Cinematography: Ajay Tandon
- Edited by: Ballu Saluja
- Music by: Himesh Reshammiya
- Production companies: Creative Eye Studios; Namah Shivay Enterprises
- Release date: 31 December 2004
- Country: India
- Language: Hindi
- Budget: ₹8 crore
- Box office: ₹1.06 crore

Aabra Ka Daabra is a 2004 Indian Hindi-language fantasy film. It is an unofficial adaptation of the Harry Potter film series.

== Plot ==
Shanu, a 12-year-old boy, lives with his mother Shivani Singh and father Rahul Singh. Rahul is a magician and escape artist, and one fateful day he locks himself in a closed box and drops it in the ocean, failing to emerge and supposedly dying. This sudden tragedy drives Shanu and his mother to live in worse conditions, and people tease Shanu for this loss, calling him the 'son of a loser'. However, Shanu wins a sponsored competition, which grants him admission to any school he wishes. He decides on admission to Aabra Ka Daabra, a school of magic.

Upon arrival, he meets new friends, as well as school caretaker Limbu. He also meets the strict principal, Rang Birangi, also referred to as RB. He studies many magic tricks in school and learns to fly on a carpet, rising the ranks to become one of the school's top students. While in school, he comes to learn that Birangi has a tendency to sneak off somewhere at night in the nearby forest. Curious, Shanu and his friends decide to secretly track Birangi by taking an invisibility pill given by Limbu, where they find Shanu's father Rahul being imprisoned by Birangi, who wants him to make "amarsanjivani," an immortality potion that he once made as a teacher at Aabra Ka Daabra.

Birangi sees Shanu and injects him with poison. To save his son, Rahul continues to make the potion and eventually cures his son. Shanu and his allies stand against Birangi, and a magical duel happens, in which Birangi promises to come back for revenge and vanishes. Shanu takes her magical wand and gives it to Dilbaug Singh, his guardian. Everyone celebrates their liberation from Birangi's rule in Aabra Ka Daabra, but Birangi's magic wand disappears magically. The movie ends with Zulu, Birangi's demon-winged servant, wondering about RB's and the mysterious disappearance of her wand.

== Cast ==
- Athit Naik as Shanu R. Singh
- Hansika Motwani as Pinky
- Satish Kaushik as Dilbaug Singh / Jadugar Pyaara Singh
- Anupam Kher as Limbu
- Krrishna as Rahul Singh
- Johnny Lever as Maneklal
- Archana Puran Singh as Suzanne
- Nupur Mehta as Jadugarni Bijli / Headmistress Rang Birangi 'RB'
- Shweta Tiwari as Shivani R. Singh
- Naveen Bawa as Mind over matter instructor
- Prabhu Deva as Dancer / Singer in the song "Shiv Om"

== Soundtrack ==
Aabra Ka Daabra

Soundtrack album by Himesh Reshammiya
- Released: 31 December 2004 (India)
- Recorded: 2004
- Venue: Mumbai
- Genre: Feature film soundtrack
- Producer: Himesh Reshammiya

Himesh Reshammiya chronology
Aitraaz (2004)	Aabra Ka Daabra (2004)	Dil Maange More (2004)

Music composed by Himesh Reshammiya. The album has 8 tracks.

Song title	Singers
"Shiv Om"	Shaan, Dheeraj Kumar Kochhar, Prabhudeva
"Chutkan Gang"	Udit Narayan, Children
"Love Hoya"	KK, Hema Sardesai, Jayesh Gandhi
"Aabra Ka Daabra"	Instrumental
"Tara Ram Pam"	Kunal Ganjawala, Children
"Aabra Ka Daabra" (Theme Music)	Instrumental
"Didave"	Anuradha Sriram
"Zindagi Zindagi"	Kumar Sanu, Alka Yagnik

== Reception ==
Taran Adarsh of IndiaFM gave the film two out of five, writing, "AABRA KA DAABRA revolves around the kids and all of them come up with decent performances. Master Athit is adorable, followed by Vishal. Hansika and Esha are effective. Tiara enacts her part well. Anupam Kher goes over the top. Satish Kaushik, Archana Puransingh, Navin Bawa and Johny Lever are adequate. Shweta Tiwari and Krrishna Sonie are fair. On the whole, AABRA KA DAABRA caters to the kids mainly and releasing it during the vacations is a step in the right direction."
