= Hello! Hum Lallan Bol Rahe Hain =

- Directed by: Dileep Shukla
- Written by: Dileep Shukla
- Produced by: Nazim Rizvi
- Starring: Rajpal Yadav; Preeti Mehra
- Cinematography: Tapan Tushar Basu
- Music by: Songs: Lalit Bhushan; Score: Surinder Sodhi
- Distributed by: Emaar Film International Unit; Whispering Shadows Entertainment
- Release date: 15 January 2010
- Running time: 130 minutes
- Country: India
- Language: Hindi

Hello! Hum Lallan Bol Rahe Hain (transl. Hello, this is Lallan speaking) is a Bollywood film starring Rajpal Yadav and Preeti Mehra in the lead roles. Produced by Nazim Rizvi and directed by Dileep Shukla, it was released under the banner of Emaar Film International Unit and Whispering Shadows Entertainment.

== Plot ==
Lallan is a security guard working in Mumbai. Lallan is honest, hard working and goes above and beyond for helping others. His uncle, Tiwari, is also his boss at work. Lallan loves Saroja, a girl who lives in his village. He regularly calls Saroja from a local phone booth. Saroja is not aware of Lallan's feelings for her and considers him a good friend. Lallan is on track for a promotion at work. After his promotion, Lallan plans to get an apartment and propose to Saroja. Ganesh, an auto-driver is Lallan's best friend, who often advises Lallan to propose Saroja soon and get married soon.

The local phone booth from where Lallan calls Saroja is owned by Hansa. Hansa notices the politeness and admires that he is a teetotaler. Not aware of Lallan's love for Saroja, Hansa asks Lallan to marry her daughter. However, Lallan politely refuses. One day Lallan has bad dream about Saroja leaving him. Getting a bad feeling, Lallan calls Saroja and learns that Saroja is going to get married. He is even more shocked to learn that she is to marry a man much older than her. Her father agrees on this marriage to get money from the groom (₹200000 (approx USD 2600)). This money is to be used as bribe for getting his son (Saroja's brother) a job. Things take a turn for worse when Saroja tells Lallan that she loves Kishan, the son of a local jeweller Laxmichand. This causes Lallan to spiral into depression. He starts missing work and loses focus.

He calls Kisan and asks him to marry Saroja by paying the money promised by the other groom, since he can easily afford it. Kisan refuses stating his father, Laxmichand, is a control freak and greedy man. Lallan decides to take matters in his own hand and decides to help Saroja. He plans to raise the money himself and get Saroja married to Kishan. He sells most of his belongings but its no where close to the required sum. Lallan prays to Lord Shiva, beseeching Lord Shiva to help him. During this time Lallan along with another security guard saves a jewelry store from getting robbed and catches the culprits. As a token for appreciation for their bravery, Lallan and his coworkers are awarded ₹100000 (approx USD 1300). However, knowing about Lallan's attempts to help Saroja, his coworkers give Lallan all the reward money. Hansa, moved by Lallan's unselfish love for Saroja, helps Lallan by giving him ₹30000 (approx USD 400). Lallan is now very hopeful that he might be able to get the required sum before Saroja's marriage. He is short only ₹50000( approx USD 650). This deficit is completed by his best friend Ganesh, who manages to raise this sum by selling his autorickshaw.

Lallan now having the required sum, he leaves for his hometown. He plans to give the money to Saroja's father, so Saroja can marry Kisan. However on the train, a couple of goons rough him up trying to steal the money. Lallan manages to escape somehow from the goons but is caught by the police. The police question Lallan regarding carrying such large sum of money thinking it is blood money. Taking help from a journalist, Lallan convinces the police and catches a train back home with the money.

He is shocked to learn that Laxmichand has already decided to marry his son Kisan to another girl, who comes from a rich family. Lallan pleads with Laxmichand who does not budge from his decision. Touched by Lallan's unselfish actions and the trouble he went to raise the money, Saroja realizes Lallan's love for her and decides to marry Lallan. The movie ends with Lallan and Saroj returning to Mumbai as a married couple.

== Cast ==
- Rajpal Yadav as Lallan
- Preeti Mehra as Saroja
- Manoj Joshi as Laxmidas
- Ketaki Dave as Hansa
- Ravi Jhankal as Tiwari
- Makarand Anaspure as Ganesh

== Music ==
Music was composed by Lalit Bhushan and Surender Sodhi.

=== Response ===
The film did well in small cities especially in the states of Bihar, Jharkhand, and Uttar Pradesh.
