= Main, Meri Patni Aur Woh =

- DVD cover
- Directed by: Chandan Arora
- Written by: Pankaj Saraswat; Ashok Khanna
- Story by: Rajpal Yadav; Gunjan Joshi
- Produced by: Ronnie Screwvala
- Starring: Rajpal Yadav; Rituparna Sengupta; Varun Badola; Kay Kay Menon
- Narrated by: Naseeruddin Shah
- Cinematography: Jehangir Choudhary
- Edited by: Dharmendra Sharma
- Music by: Rocky Khanna; Mohit Chauhan; Nayab Raja
- Production companies: UTV Motion Pictures; Makefilms
- Release date: 7 October 2005
- Running time: 129 mins
- Language: Hindi
- Budget: ₹2.5 crore
- Box office: ₹3.37 crore

Main, Meri Patni Aur Woh (English: Me, My Wife and Him) (Note: The name of the film is a play of words on the 1978 film Pati Patni Aur Woh. The Hindi pronoun Woh in both films refers to a 3rd person, of whom the hero is suspicious.) is a 2005 Indian romantic comedy film, directed by Chandan Arora, starring Rajpal Yadav, Rituparna Sengupta and Kay Kay Menon as the leading actors. The film was released on 7 October 2005. It is inspired from Malayalam film Vadakkunokkiyantram.

== Plot ==
The film is about a qualified but short, 34-year-old man named Mithilesh and his insecurities about his height and personality when he marries Veena. He had never imagined such a pretty and well-grounded woman would marry him. As his married life progresses with his devoted wife, his insecurities continue to grow. He becomes jealous of his friend Saleem, Veena's childhood friend Akash, and others who he claims are infatuated. Slowly, he suspects a change in Veena's behavior and starts believing she wants a divorce. Being a loving husband, he confesses his fear to Veena. But the hidden truth, disclosed at the very end, ultimately brings the couple closer.

== Cast ==
- Rajpal Yadav as Mithilesh 'Chhotey Babu' Shukla
- Rituparna Sengupta as Veena M. Shukla (née Tiwari)
- Vinod Nagpal as Advocate Kishorilal Mishra
- Varun Badola as Saleem
- Kay Kay Menon as Akash
- Naseeruddin Shah as The Narrator
- Abdul Basir as Abdul Basir
- Anil Rastogi

== Production ==
The film was shot in Lucknow.

== Soundtrack ==
Track	Title	Artist(s)	Composer	Lyricist	Length
1	"Doob Jaana Re"	Shreya Ghoshal, Sonu Nigam	Rocky Khanna	Rocky Khanna	06:24
2	"Paintra"	Mohit Chauhan	Mohit Chauhan	Rocky Khanna	05:40
3	"Guncha - Unplugged"	Mohit Chauhan & Chorus	Mohit Chauhan	Mohit Chauhan	05:44
4	"Ye Aankh Sharabi Jaadu"	Kunal Ganjawala	Nayab Raja	Zahir Anwar	03:02
5	"Guncha"	Mohit Chauhan	Mohit Chauhan	Mohit Chauhan	05:34
6	"Chand Varga"	Naeem Shamim Ajmeri, Rajendra Shiv	Rocky Khanna	Rocky Khanna	05:07
7	"Yeh Kya Ho Raha Hai"	Kavita Krishnamurthy	Nayab Raja	Vivek Kumar	04:08
8	"Theme - Instrumental"	Instrumental	Mohit Chauhan		05:52

== Critical reception ==
Indrani Roy Mitra of Rediff.com wrote "A taut, yet down-to-earth, script keeps the film's interest alive till the last minute. Like Madhuri Dixit, here, too, Chandan's deft use of popular Hindi film songs to accentuate the mood of certain sequences deserves special mention." Conversely Kaveree Bamzai of India Today called the script "stodgy" and criticised the casting of Yadav by writing, "Rajpal Yadav is a fine comic but it doesn't necessarily make him a versatile actor. So instead of the usual gags, the ones which have audiences in splits, he tries to do a Dilip Kumar. Which means he says his lines extremely slowly as if he is addressing a confederacy of dunces, and tortures himself-and the audience-with all manner of imaginary woes." Taran Adarsh of IndiaFM gave the film 1 out of 5, writing, "On the whole, MAIN MERI PATNI AUR WOH is a decent entertainer that could've been an engaging fare had it not been for a mediocre second half. It might appeal to a handful of critics [in awe of such cinema], but definitely not the common man who decides the fate of a film."
