= Jo Bole So Nihaal (film) =

- Theatrical release poster
- Directed by: Rahul Rawail
- Screenplay by: Raju Saigal
- Dialogues by: Sanjay Chhel; Aman Jaffery; Bolu Khan
- Story by: Raju Saigal
- Produced by: N.R. Pachisia
- Starring: Sunny Deol; Shillpi Sharma; Kamaal Khan
- Cinematography: Surendra Rao; Jalesh Oberoi; Aseem Bajaj
- Edited by: Rahul Rawail
- Music by: Songs: Anand Raaj Anand; Score: Ranjit Barot
- Production companies: Sahara Movie Studios; T-Series
- Distributed by: VR Entertainers Ltd. MDR Productions
- Release date: 13 May 2005
- Running time: 127 minutes
- Country: India
- Language: Hindi

Jo Bole So Nihaal (also transliterated as Jo Bole So Nihal; literally meaning "Whoever utters shall be fulfilled") is a 2005 Indian action comedy film, directed by Rahul Rawail. It stars Sunny Deol, Shillpi Sharma and Kamaal Khan, while Nupur Mehta and Surekha Sikri appear in supporting roles; the director also plays a role in the film. This was the singer Kamaal Khan's debut film as an actor.

The film's release was met by protests from a few Sikh groups, who took offense at its use of a Sikh religious phrase as its title. Two bomb attacks on 22 May 2005 on theatres in New Delhi showing the film killed one person and injured 49, prompting cinema owners to pull the film, in some cases voluntarily and in some states as a result of a government order.

== Plot ==
Nihaal Singh is an honest and beloved constable from Punjab.

A chance encounter with the criminal Romeo changes his life forever. Romeo is an unstoppable mercenary who moves from country to country in a wave of terror. When Nihaal Singh unwittingly aids the terrorist in his escape, Nihaal is labeled a traitor. He finds himself suspended from his job, ridiculed, and hated by his village.

Meanwhile, Romeo has taken his merciless campaign to New York. Intelligence reports reveal that Romeo has entered the US in a plot to kill the President. Now, the FBI is desperate to find Romeo, but the villain is a man without a face and therefore invisible. The only person who knows what the menace looks like is Nihaal Singh.

The FBI recruits Nihaal Singh to come to New York and aid them in capturing Romeo. Guided by bilingual FBI agents Suzanne Kaur and Manoj Bhatnagar, among others. Later, Nihaal and Suzanne fall in love. Nihaal hunts Romeo for the safety of America. He asks for one thing in return for Romeo's capture: to bring the villain to his hometown in Punjab, thereby clearing his name and restoring his former glory.

== Cast ==
- Sunny Deol as Constable Nihaal Singh
- Shillpi Sharma as FBI Agent Satinder "Suzanne" Kaur
- Kamaal Khan as Romeo / Sikander
- Nupur Mehta as Liza
- Thomas Tevana as FBI Agent Manoj Bhatnagar
- Surekha Sikri as Mrs. Balwanth Singh; Nihal's grandmother
- Surendra Pal as Balwanth Singh; Nihal's father
- Arun Bakshi as Rajinder Singh
- Valbona Coba as FBI Agent Tevana
- Gary Castro Churchwell FBI Agent Patrick Sykes
- Dolly Bindra as Nihal's friend/sister
- Kunal Vijaykar as Tayyab Ali (Nihal's brother-in-law)
- Rahul Rawail as Al Fatah, a terrorist

== Music and soundtrack ==
The music for the film’s songs was composed by Anand Raaj Anand and the lyrics of the songs were penned by Dev Kohli. The background score of the movie was provided by Ranjit Barot.

Jo Bole So Nihaal

Soundtrack album by Anand Raaj Anand
- Genre: Feature film soundtrack
- Label: T-Series

| # | Title | Singer(s) |
|---|---|---|
| 1 | "Jo Bole So Nihaal" | Sukhwinder Singh |
| 2 | "Main Yaar Punjabi Jatt" | Udit Narayan, Sunidhi Chauhan |
| 3 | "Raat Kuchh Aur Thi" | Sunidhi Chauhan |
| 4 | "Rab Jaane" | Kamaal Khan, Alka Yagnik |
| 5 | "Rab Jaane (Version 2)" | Kamaal Khan, Alka Yagnik |

== Release ==
Before the release, SGPC and other Sikh organizations, offended by the film's use of a Sikh religious phrase as its title, urged the Central Board of Film Certification to ban the film.

Following protests from several Sikh organisations upon its release, the film was withdrawn from all theatres in Punjab. On 22 May 2005, One person was reported dead and more than 49 others injured after bombs exploded in two cinema halls showing the film in New Delhi. Due to these explosions, several of the film's shows were cancelled in numerous theatres throughout the nation.

== Reception ==
Jaspreet Pandohar of BBC.com called it "a one-man show from start to end." He further wrote that the film "will please die-hard Sunny Deol fans as well as anyone who likes to see the Yanks get upstaged." Taran Adarsh of IndiaFM gave the film 2.5 out of 5, writing, "On the whole, JO BOLE SO NIHAAL has three aces -- Sunny Deol, excellent comedy and vibrant action. But the post-interval portions are plain ordinary."

As per reports, in Punjab, Haryana, and Chandigarh, where the film was withdrawn from theatres due to protests, pirated CDs of the film were being sold in large numbers.
