= Khwahish =

- DVD cover
- Directed by: Govind Menon
- Written by: Govind Menon
- Produced by: Vivek Nayak
- Starring: Himanshu Malik; Mallika Sherawat
- Cinematography: Uday Devare
- Edited by: Anand Subbaya
- Music by: Songs: Milind Sagar; Score: D. Imman
- Distributed by: Mojdeh & Mojtaba Movies
- Release date: 6 June 2003
- Running time: 152 minutes
- Country: India
- Language: Hindi

Khwahish (transl. 'Desire') is a 2003 Indian Hindi romance film presented by Akbar Arabiyan (Mojdeh and Mojtaba Movies) and directed by Govind Menon. The film stars Himanshu Malik and Mallika Sherawat.

== Plot ==
Amar is a rich and stubborn man. He meets Lekha in a shop. While Lekha is poor (the daughter of a poultry farmer), she is a happy, frank, and straightforward girl. When Amar and Lekha study in college, they spend time together and finally fall in love. After the exams, Amar cannot take the separation and proposes to her. Her father Ulhas befriends Amar and accepts the marriage. However, Amar's wealthy politician father does not, as he cannot reconcile to the difference in status. Also, he wants his son to complete his studies first before getting married. Amar breaks contact with his father and marries Lekha. The married couple move into their new little home, but after days of happiness and good times, medical reports indicate Lekha has leukemia.

== Cast ==
- Himanshu Malik as Amar Ranawat
- Mallika Sherawat as Lekha Khorzuvekar
- Mahmud Babai as Ulhas Khorzuvekar (Lekha's Father)
- Shivaji Satam as Amar's Father

== Music ==
Music was composed by Milind Sagar. Lyrics were written by Faiz Anwar. All tracks were sung by Asha Bhosle.

Song	Singer
"Baila Baila"	Asha Bhosle
"Rang Raliyan"	Asha Bhosle
"Sapnon Mein"	Asha Bhosle
"Jaan-E-Man"	Asha Bhosle, KK
"Gungunati Hai"	Asha Bhosle, Udit Narayan
"Hum Dono Hain Khoye"	Asha Bhosle, Udit Narayan

== Reception ==
=== Box office ===
According to Box Office India, the film earned ₹51.9 million (equivalent to ₹190 million or US$2.0 million in 2023) against a budget of ₹25 million (equivalent to ₹92 million or US$960,000 in 2023). Rediff.com called the collection of the film "commission earner" in Mumbai and "average" in other cities.

=== Critical response ===
Taran Adarsh of IndiaFM gave the film 1 star out of 5, writing "On the whole, KHWAHISH leaves many 'khwahishes' unfulfilled. The gentry would find it hard to relate to a love story with minimal emotions, while the front benchers - expecting a lot of skin show - will be grossly disappointed as well. At the box-office, the film will face an uphill task." Adhitya Suvarna of Rediff.com gave a negative review, writing "Khwahish is a waste of time. Forget the script; there is none. What's worse, the chemistry between the lead couple, Mallika Sherawat and Himanshu Malik, is non-existent. The much-hyped 17 kisses come and go before you even realise it."
