= Dirty Politics (film) =

- Directed by: K. C. Bokadia
- Written by: K. C. Bokadia
- Story by: K. C. Bokadia
- Starring: Mallika Sherawat; Jackie Shroff; Anupam Kher; Om Puri; Ashutosh Rana; Rajpal Yadav; Naseeruddin Shah
- Cinematography: Paneer Selvam
- Edited by: Prakash Jha
- Music by: Songs: Aadesh Shrivastav; Robby Badal; Sanjeev Darshan; Lyrics: Sameer
- Production companies: B.M.B Music & Magnetics Ltd.
- Distributed by: Zee Music
- Release date: 6 March 2015
- Running time: 130 minutes
- Country: India
- Language: Hindi

Dirty Politics is a 2015 Indian Hindi-language political thriller written and directed by K. C. Bokadia with an ensemble cast. The film was released on 6 March 2015 with an adult rating due to its strong sexual content. It was a box office disaster.

== Plot ==
The film is based on the infamous Bhanwari Devi case of an auxiliary nurse from Rajasthan who disappeared on 1 September 2011.

== Cast ==
- Naseeruddin Shah as Manoj Singh
- Mallika Sherawat as Anokhi Devi
- Jackie Shroff as Mukhtiar Singh
- Anupam Kher as CBI officer Satya Prakash Mishra
- Om Puri as Dina Nath Singh, Jan Seva Party President
- Atul Kulkarni as Nirbhay Singh, Police Inspector
- Rahul Solanki
- Ashutosh Rana as Dayal Singh
- Rajpal Yadav as Banaram, Anokhi Devi's bodyguard
- Sushant Singh as Nischay Singh, Police Inspector
- Govind Namdev as Karan Singh, Police Superintendent
- Charu Sharma
- Awadhesh Mishra as Jabbar Singh
- Sunil Pal as Nathu Lal
- Komal Nahta as Newsreader

== Soundtrack ==
The soundtrack was composed by Sanjeev Darshan and Aadesh Shrivastava, and Sameer wrote the lyrics. It was Aadesh Shrivastav's last film as a music composer.

No.	Title	Singer(s)	Length
1.	"Ghaghara"	Mamta Sharma	4:25
2.	"Chal Dum"	Neha Bhasin	4:06
Total length:			8:31

== Critical reception ==
This film received highly negative reviews from critics, criticising everything The initial posters of the film courted controversy for depicting Sherawat draped in the Indian tricolour, due to which a case was lodged against the director under the Prevention of Insults to National Honour Act.
