= Chandrakant Singh =

Indian director and producer (born 1979)

- Born: 17 July 1979 (age 47); Indore, India
- Occupations: Director, Producer
- Years active: 1991–present

Chandrakant Singh (born 17 July 1979) is an Indian director and producer who has directed Hindi films such as Rama Rama Kya Hai Dramaaa. and Bin Bulaye Baraati. Be Careful, Six X , Main Zaroor Aaunga and the most recent film he has directed is Kya Masti Kya Dhoom which was released on waves ott in December2024. He is regularly attending film festival all over the world and been making short films as producer and director been showcasing the in cannes film festival,.

== Background ==
Born and brought up in Indore, Chandrakant Singh family hails from Jodhpur, Rajasthan. His father was in the transportation business and his mother is a homemaker. His brother Abhay Singh was a film distributor. Chandrakant has a Graduation degree in Science - Biology from Devi Ahiliya University indore . He also did a one year course in scripting and direction from New York Film Academy in Los Angeles.

== Filmography ==
Year	Title	Role
1996	Mr. Bechara	Assistant Director
1996–1997	Mr. Uday Shankar Pani documentaries	Assistant Director
1999	Aaj Ki Ramayan	Director
1999–2002	TV Commercials	Director
2004	Documentary for Cancer in Women	Director
2008	Rama Rama Kya Hai Dramaaa	Director
2011	Bin Bulaye Baraati	Director
2011	Be Careful	Director
2016	Scapegoat	Producer
2018	Six X	Producer & director
2019	Main Zaroor Aaunga	Director
2024	Kya Masti Kya Dhoom	Director
2026	Fashion Street (web series)	Producer and director
2023	Pyar Conditions Apply	Producer and director
2023	Lost in Goa	Director

Womaniya Producer and director Web series 2025 Being Alive Short film 2024 Parchiyaan Short film 2023 Life Short film 2024 Dustbin Short film 2025 HungerGame Short film 2026
