= Rajpal Yadav =

Indian actor and comedian (born 1971)

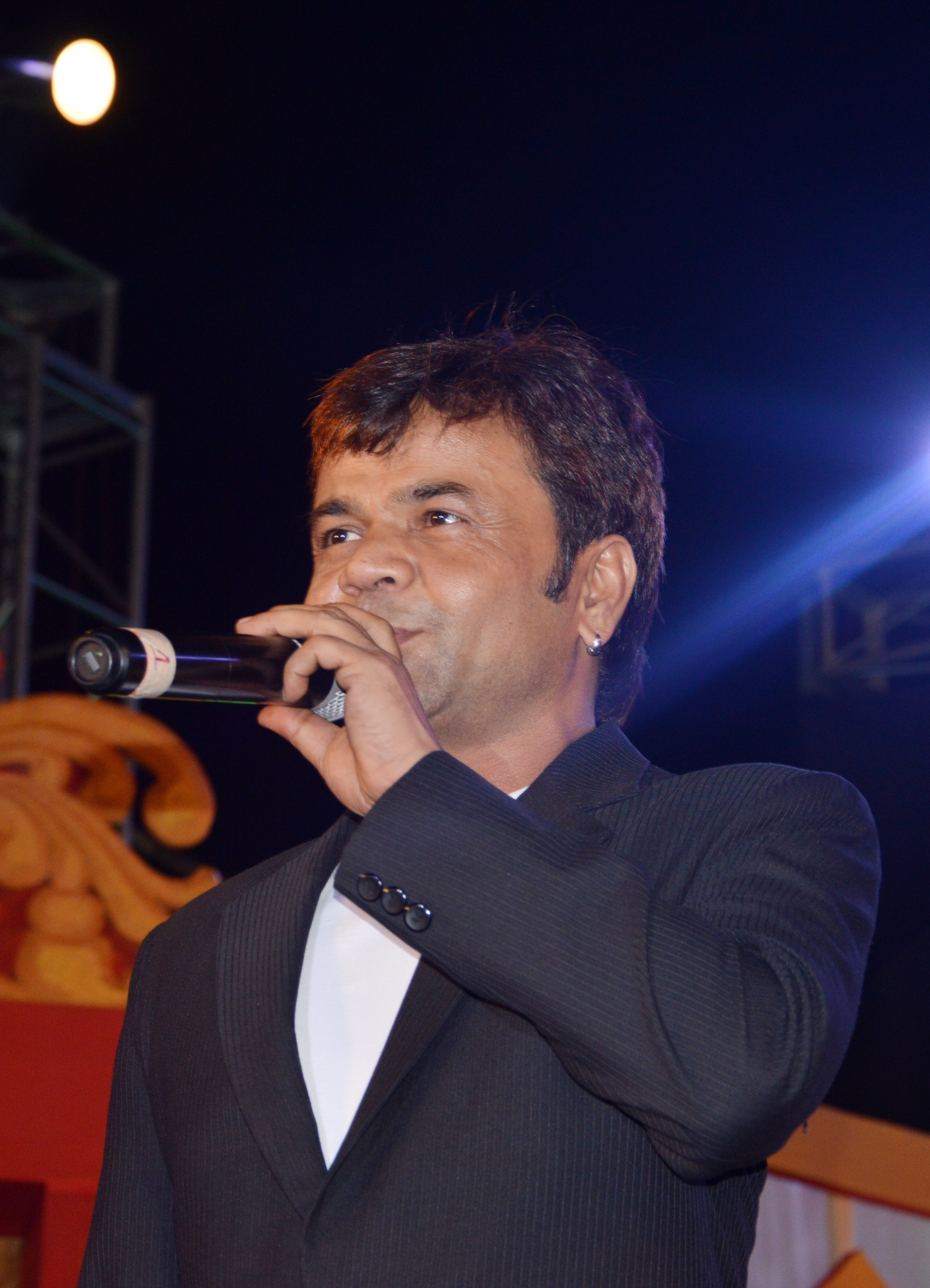
- Yadav in 2016
- Born: Rajpal Naurang Yadav; 16 March 1971 (age 55); Kundra, Uttar Pradesh, India
- Education: National School of Drama
- Occupation: Actor/Comedian
- Years active: 1999–present
- Spouses: Karuna (m. 1992, died); Radha Yadav (m. 2003)
- Children: 3

Rajpal Naurang Yadav (born 16 March 1971) is an Indian actor and comedian who primarily works in Hindi cinema. His breakthrough came in Ram Gopal Varma's Jungle (2000) with a negative role. Although Yadav gained widespread recognition from his slapstick comic performances over the years and has been nominated for several awards such as Filmfare and Screen Awards.

Some of his most notable works include Ek Aur Ek Gyarah (2003), Mujhse Shaadi Karogi (2004), Waqt: The Race Against Time (2005), Phir Hera Pheri (2006), Partner (2007), Bhool Bhulaiyaa (2007), Bhoothnath, Krazzy 4 (both 2008), Krrish 3 (2013), Bhool Bhulaiyaa 2 (2022) and the Priyadarshan films such as Hungama (2003), Garam Masala, Malamaal Weekly (both 2005), Chup Chup Ke, Bhagam Bhag (both 2006).

He has starred in leading roles and serious characters including Main Madhuri Dixit Banna Chahti Hoon (2003), Main, Meri Patni Aur Woh (2005), Rama Rama Kya Hai Drama (2008), Kushti (2010) and Ardh (2022).

== Career ==
Yadav acted in the DD National's television serial Mungeri Ke Bhai Naurangilal. This was the sequel to Mungerilal Ke Haseen Sapne. His first film was Shool (1999), in which he played the role of a coolie.

Although Yadav found success in negative roles, he preferred comic roles, as in Pyaar Tune Kya Kiya, and he went on to become a prolific comic enthusiast in Hindi films. His films include Hungama, Waqt: The Race Against Time, Chup Chup Ke, Garam Masala, Phir Hera Pheri and Dhol.

Yadav has also been the leading character in more serious films including Main Madhuri Dixit Banna Chahti Hoon, Ladies Tailor, Rama Rama Kya Hai Drama, Hello! Hum Lallan Bol Rahe Hain, Kushti, Mirch, Benny and Babloo and Main, Meri Patni Aur Woh.

For the film Jungle, he won the Sansui Screen Best actor award in a Negative Role along with a nomination for the Screen Best Actor award. He received the Yash Bharati Award for the film Main Madhuri Dixit Banna Chahti Hoon. Yadav was also given the Janpad Ratna Award.

He made his Telugu language debut in 2015 with Kick 2, and also played a role in multilingual film Amma.

He had also worked as lead against Anjali Sharma in psychological drama titled 'Son' directed and produced by Paul Rupesh.

== Personal life ==
Yadav took acting training from National School of Drama. Yadav married his first wife in 1992. After the birth of their first child, she died due to certain complications. He went on to marry Radha Yadav in 2003 after establishing himself in the industry. He has three daughters.

== Legal disputes ==
Yadav was given a 10-day imprisonment in 2013 for filing a false affidavit in court. He spent four days in jail from 3 December 2013 until 6 December 2013 after which a division bench of the High Court suspended the sentence on his appeal. He was sentenced to 3 months in civil prison for non repayment of loan which he took in 2010 for his directorial debut by the Delhi High Court on 30 November 2018. He was immediately taken into custody by the Delhi Police. Subsequently, in November 2018, Delhi High Court issued a three-month prison sentence which affected his career.

In February 2026, Yadav was sent to Tihar Jail after the Delhi High Court rejected his plea seeking additional time to repay outstanding dues in a long-running cheque bounce case. The case originated from a loan taken in 2010 for the production of his directorial debut film, Ata Pata Laapata, and the unpaid amount reportedly increased to nearly ₹9 crore over time due to interest and penalties. The court ordered his surrender after noting repeated failures to comply with earlier undertakings related to repayment. He surrendered on 5 February 2026 to serve a six-month sentence under provisions related to dishonour of cheques under the Negotiable Instruments Act.

Before surrendering, Yadav spoke publicly about his financial difficulties. Speaking to Bollywood Hungama, he stated:

"Sir, kya karoon? Mere paas paise nahin hain (sir, what to do? I don’t have the money to pay back). Aur koi upaay nahin dikhta (can’t see another way out)."

When asked if he had considered seeking help from colleagues or industry friends such as Priyadarshan, who has frequently collaborated with him, Yadav added:

"Sir, yahan hum sab akele hain (sir, we are all on our own over here). There are no friends. I have to deal with this crisis on my own."

His statements drew widespread attention and sympathy within the film industry and on social media. Actor Sonu Sood expressed support for Yadav, announcing that he would cast him in an upcoming film and offer a signing amount adjustable against future work. Sood described the gesture as professional support rather than charity and urged members of the film industry to stand together during difficult times faced by fellow artists.

In 2026, Rajpal Yadav secured interim bail in a ₹9 crore cheque bounce case tied to a 2010 film loan. After briefly surrendering, he paid part of the dues as ordered and declined to name Bollywood figures who reportedly assisted him, saying he did not want sympathy.

== Filmography ==
Key
| † | Denotes films that have not yet been released |

=== Films ===
==== Hindi films ====
| Year | Film | Role | Notes |
|---|---|---|---|
| 1999 | Dil Kya Kare | School's Watchman | |
| 1999 | Mast | Peon | |
| 1999 | Shool | Coolie | |
| 2000 | Jungle | Sippa | |
| 2001 | Pyaar Tune Kya Kiya | Rampal Yadav / Chhota Vakeel | |
| 2001 | Chandni Bar | Iqbal Chamdi | |
| 2001 | Yeh Zindagi Ka Safar | Dada | |
| 2002 | Koi Mere Dil Se Poochhe | Raj Naidu | |
| 2002 | Tumko Na Bhool Paayenge | Lallan | |
| 2002 | Company | Joseph | |
| 2002 | Lal Salaam | Dhattu | |
| 2002 | Hum Kisise Kum Nahin | Thief At The Parking Lot | |
| 2002 | Maine Dil Tujhko Diya | Munna | |
| 2002 | Chor Machaaye Shor | Johnny | |
| 2002 | Road | Bhanwar Singh | |
| 2002 | Maseeha | | |
| 2003 | Ek Aur Ek Gyarah | Chhotu | |
| 2003 | The Hero: Love Story of a Spy | Dorji | |
| 2003 | Haasil | Chhutku | |
| 2003 | Darna Mana Hai | Apple Vendor | Story segment: Apples |
| 2003 | Hungama | Raja | |
| 2003 | Main Madhuri Dixit Banna Chahti Hoon | Rajeshwar Singh (Raja) | |
| 2003 | Kal Ho Naa Ho | Guru | |
| 2004 | Dil Bechara Pyaar Ka Maara | Tunda Bhai | |
| 2004 | Love in Nepal | Bunty Guide | |
| 2004 | Insaaf: The Justice | Kailu | |
| 2004 | Aan: Men at Work | Apte | |
| 2004 | Garv: Pride and Honour | Informer 555 | Cameo appearance |
| 2004 | Mujhse Shaadi Karogi | Raj Purohit / Paul | |
| 2004 | Taarzan: The Wonder Car | Havaldar Sitaram | |
| 2004 | Shart: The Challenge | Bhootnath | |
| 2004 | Vaastu Shastra | Raajpal | |
| 2004 | Netaji Subhas Chandra Bose: The Forgotten Hero | Bhagat Ram Talwar | |
| 2005 | Waqt: The Race Against Time | Laxman | |
| 2005 | Kyaa Kool Hai Hum | Uma Shankar Tripathi | |
| 2005 | D | Dance Artist | |
| 2005 | Paheli | Bhoja | |
| 2005 | Maine Pyaar Kyun Kiya? | Thapa | |
| 2005 | Bye Bye Miss Goodnight | Rajesh | |
| 2005 | James | Tony | |
| 2005 | Main, Meri Patni Aur Woh | Mithilesh Shukla | |
| 2005 | Garam Masala | Babban | |
| 2005 | Shaadi No. 1 | Mr.Y | |
| 2006 | Apna Sapna Money Money | Matha Prasad | |
| 2006 | Love in Japan | Chakra D. Dhari | |
| 2006 | Malamaal Weekly | Bajbahadur a.k.a. Bajey | |
| 2006 | Shaadi Se Pehle | 'Shayar' Kanpuri | |
| 2006 | Darna Zaroori Hai | Insurance Agent Prabhakar Pandit | Story segment: Accidents are Never Predicted |
| 2006 | Phir Hera Pheri | Pappu (Anjali's brother) | |
| 2006 | Chup Chup Ke | Bandya | |
| 2006 | Ladies Tailor | Chander | |
| 2006 | Baabul | Balraj's Chauffeur | |
| 2006 | Bhagam Bhag | Gulab Singh 'Gullu' Lakhan Singh Haryanewale | |
| 2007 | Anwar | Gopinath | |
| 2007 | Undertrial | Sagar Hussain | |
| 2007 | Partner | Chhota Don | |
| 2007 | Ram Gopal Varma Ki Aag | Rambha Bhai | |
| 2007 | Dhol | Marthand 'Maru' Dhamdere | |
| 2007 | Go | Jagtap Tiwari | |
| 2007 | Bhool Bhulaiyaa | Chhote Pandit / Lal Hanuman | |
| 2008 | Kahaani Gudiya Ki True Story of a Woman | Feroz | |
| 2008 | Bhoothnath | Anthony | |
| 2008 | Rama Rama Kya Hai Drama | Santosh | |
| 2008 | Krazzy 4 | Gangadhar | |
| 2008 | Hastey Hastey | Sunny Malhotra, Raj and Jai | |
| 2008 | Mere Baap Pehle Aap | Manu | |
| 2008 | Yeh Mera India | Bhola Paswan | |
| 2008 | God Tussi Great Ho | Rangeela – Lottery Stall Owner | |
| 2008 | C Kkompany | Lambodhar Jha | |
| 2008 | Chamku | Hussain | |
| 2008 | Jumbo | Dildaar | Animated film Voice only |
| 2009 | Daddy Cool | Andrew | |
| 2009 | Chal Chala Chal | Sunder | |
| 2009 | Billu | Jhallan Kumar | |
| 2009 | Ek Se Bure Do | Tony | |
| 2009 | Kal Kissne Dekha | Jailor | |
| 2009 | Do Knot Disturb | Mangu | |
| 2009 | De Dana Dan | Dagdu Yadav | |
| 2009 | Bolo Raam | Aatmaa Raam | |
| 2010 | Hello! Hum Lallan Bol Rahe Hain | Lallan | |
| 2010 | Rann | Anand Prakash Trivedi | |
| 2010 | Kushti | Chander Singh | |
| 2010 | Khatta Meetha | Rangila | |
| 2010 | Mirch | Kashi | |
| 2010 | Benny and Babloo | Babloo Charan Lathi | |
| 2010 | Action Replayy | Bhikhu | |
| 2010 | Toofan | Raju | |
| 2010 | Tumse Milkar | Kutty | |
| 2011 | Masti Express | Raju | |
| 2011 | Satrangee Parachute | Parimal Babu | |
| 2011 | Bin Bulaye Baraati | Murari | |
| 2011 | Be Careful | Sachidanand Brijmohan Pandit | |
| 2012 | Ata Pata Lapata | Manav Chaturvedi | |
| 2012 | Kamaal Dhamaal Malamaal | Narrator | Voice role |
| 2013 | Zindagi 50-50 | Lele | |
| 2013 | Janta V/S Janardan – Bechara Aam Aadmi | | |
| 2013 | Policegiri | Tutu | |
| 2013 | Rangrezz | | |
| 2013 | D-Day | Himself | In song "Duma Dum" |
| 2013 | Krrish 3 | Sharma | |
| 2014 | Main Tera Hero | Peter | |
| 2014 | Bhopal: A Prayer for Rain | Dilip | |
| 2014 | Thoda Lutf Thoda Ishq | Ghungroo | |
| 2015 | Baankey Ki Crazy Baraat | Baankey | |
| 2015 | Amma | Radhe Krishna Yadav | Unreleased |
| 2015 | Hai Golmaal in White House | Don | |
| 2015 | Dirty Politics | Banna Ram | |
| 2015 | Bumper Draw | Farooq | |
| 2015 | Welcome Back | The Tailor | Cameo appearance |
| 2016 | Fire Fighter | | |
| 2016 | Pirate | Director: Priyadarshan | |
| 2017 | Judwaa 2 | Nandu | |
| 2017 | Babuji Ek Ticket Bambai | Farhan Rehman Khan / Akki | |
| 2018 | Shraap 3D | | |
| 2018 | Tishnagi | | |
| 2018 | Love Training | Bhikhari | |
| 2018 | Shaadi Teri Bajayenge Hum Band | Selfie Don | |
| 2020 | Coolie No. 1 | Mama | Released on Amazon Prime Video |
| 2021 | Hello Charlie | Forest Ranger | Released on Amazon Prime Video |
| 2021 | Hungama 2 | Popat Jamal / Raja Dhatingarh Dhingra | Released on Disney+ Hotstar |
| 2021 | Time to Dance | Sada | |
| 2021 | Bhoot Police | Goggal Baba | Released on Disney+ Hotstar |
| 2022 | Cinemaa Zindabad | Shyam Kapoor | MX Player film |
| 2022 | Bhool Bhulaiyaa 2 | Chhote Pandit | Sequel of Bhool Bhulaiyaa |
| 2022 | Ladki: Dragon Girl | Swami | |
| 2022 | Ardh | Shiva | ZEE5 Film |
| 2022 | Match of Life | | |
| 2022 | Khalli Balli | | |
| 2022 | Thai Massage | Jugnu Bhaiya | |
| 2022 | Dangerous | | |
| 2023 | Gunchakkar | Baba Fanse | Short film on Amazon miniTV |
| 2023 | Hume Toh Loot Liya | Ram | MX Player film |
| 2023 | Shehzada | Inspector Satish Yadav | |
| 2023 | Bad Boy | | |
| 2023 | Kathal | Patrakar Anuj | Netflix film |
| 2023 | Satyaprem Ki Katha | Doodhiya | |
| 2023 | Non Stop Dhamaal | Raju Bhangarwala | |
| 2023 | Dream Girl 2 | Shoukiya | |
| 2023 | Hum Tumhe Chahte Hai | | |
| 2023 | Apurva | Jugnu | Released on Disney+ Hotstar |
| 2024 | Welcome Wedding | | |
| 2024 | Kaam Chalu Hai | Manoj Patil | ZEE5 Film |
| 2024 | Luv Ki Arrange Marriage | Pyare | |
| 2024 | Chandu Champion | Topaz | |
| 2024 | Pad Gaye Pange | Captain Jahaaz Singh | |
| 2024 | Bhool Bhulaiyaa 3 | Chhote Pandit | |
| 2024 | Naam | Kunj Bihari | Released after 20 years |
| 2024 | Vanvaas | Pappu | |
| 2024 | Baby John | Ram Sevak / Jackie | |
| 2025 | Interrogation | Bansilal | ZEE5 film |
| 2025 | Agent Ching Attacks | | short film |
| 2026 | Bhooth Bangla | Sunder "Balli" Bajwa | |
| 2026 | Hai Jawani Toh Ishq Hona Hai | PT Master Mishra | |
| 2026 | Welcome to the Jungle | Das | |
| 2026 | Ghamasaan | | |
| 2026 | Haiwaan | Chandu | |
| 2027 | SVC 63 † | Filming | |

==== Other language films ====
| Year | Film | Role | Language | Notes |
|---|---|---|---|---|
| 2007 | Chasme Bahadur | Owner of Beer Shop | Marathi | |
| 2007 | Lage Raho Yadav Bhaiya | | Bhojpuri | |
| 2011 | Rada Rox | | Marathi | |
| 2013 | Ronde Saare Vyah Picho | Chunnu Singh Dhillon | Punjabi | |
| 2015 | Kick 2 | Dunna | Telugu | |
| 2015 | Dagdabaichi Chal | Yogesh Paul | Marathi | |
| 2016 | Bhagya Na Jaane Koi | Madhav | Awadhi | |
| 2017 | Shrestha Bangali | Kesto Master | Bengali | |
| 2019 | Chandigarh Amritsar Chandigarh | Rickshaw Driver | Punjabi | |

=== Television ===
| Year | Title | Role | Notes |
|---|---|---|---|
| 1999 | Mungeri Ke Bhai Naurangilal | | |
| 1992 | Svapnavāsavadattam | Vidūṣaka (comedian) | Sanskrit serial on Doordarshan |
| 2023 | Pop Kaun? | Sultan Qureshi | |
| 2026 | Naagin 7 | | Special appearance; episode 30 |

=== Dubbing roles ===
| Film title | Actor | Character | Dub Language | Original Language | Original Year Release | Dub Year Release | Notes |
|---|---|---|---|---|---|---|---|
| Sivaji: The Boss | Vivek † | Arivu | Hindi | Tamil | 2007 | 2010 | |

== Awards and nominations ==
| Year | Award | Category | Role | Film | Result | Ref. |
|---|---|---|---|---|---|---|
| 2006 | Filmfare Awards | Best Performance in a Comic Role | Laxman, Servant | Waqt: The Race Against Time (2005) | Nominated | |
| 2004 | IIFA Awards | Best Performance in a Comic Role | Raja (Tulsidas Khan) | Hungama (2003) | Nominated | |
| 2004 | IIFA Awards | Best Performance in a Comic Role | Guru | Kal Ho Naa Ho (2003) | Nominated | |
| 2008 | IIFA Awards | Best Performance in a Comic Role | Lal Hanuman Natwar a.k.a. Chhote Pandit | Bhool Bhulaiyaa (2007) | Nominated | |
| 2009 | IIFA Awards | Best Performance in a Comic Role | Anthony | Bhoothnath (2008) | Nominated | |
| 2001 | Screen Awards | Best Actor in a Negative Role | Sippa | Jungle (2000) | Won | |
| 2005 | Screen Awards | Best Comedian | Raj Purohit Jyotshi | Mujhse Shaadi Karogi (2004) | Nominated | |
| 2006 | Screen Awards | Best Comedian | Mithilesh 'Chhotey Babu' Shukla | Main, Meri Patni Aur Woh (2005) | Nominated | |
| 2008 | Screen Awards | Best Comedian | Gangadhar | Krazzy 4 | Nominated | |
| 2016 | Screen Awards | Best Ensemble Cast | Tailor | Welcome Back (2015) | Nominated | |
| 2004 | Zee Cine Awards | Best Actor in a Supporting Role | Raja | Main Madhuri Dixit Banna Chahti Hoon (2003) | Nominated | |
| 2006 | Zee Cine Awards | Best Actor in a Comic Role | Mithilesh 'Chhotey Babu' Shukla | Main, Meri Patni Aur Woh (2005) | Nominated | |
| 2009 | Apsara Awards | Best Actor in a Comic Role | Anthony | Bhoothnath (2008) | Nominated | |
| 2006 | Bollywood Movie Awards | Best Comic Actor | Mithilesh 'Chhotey Babu' Shukla | Main, Meri Patni Aur Woh (2005) | Nominated | |
