= Narsingh Rajput =

Indian film director and producer

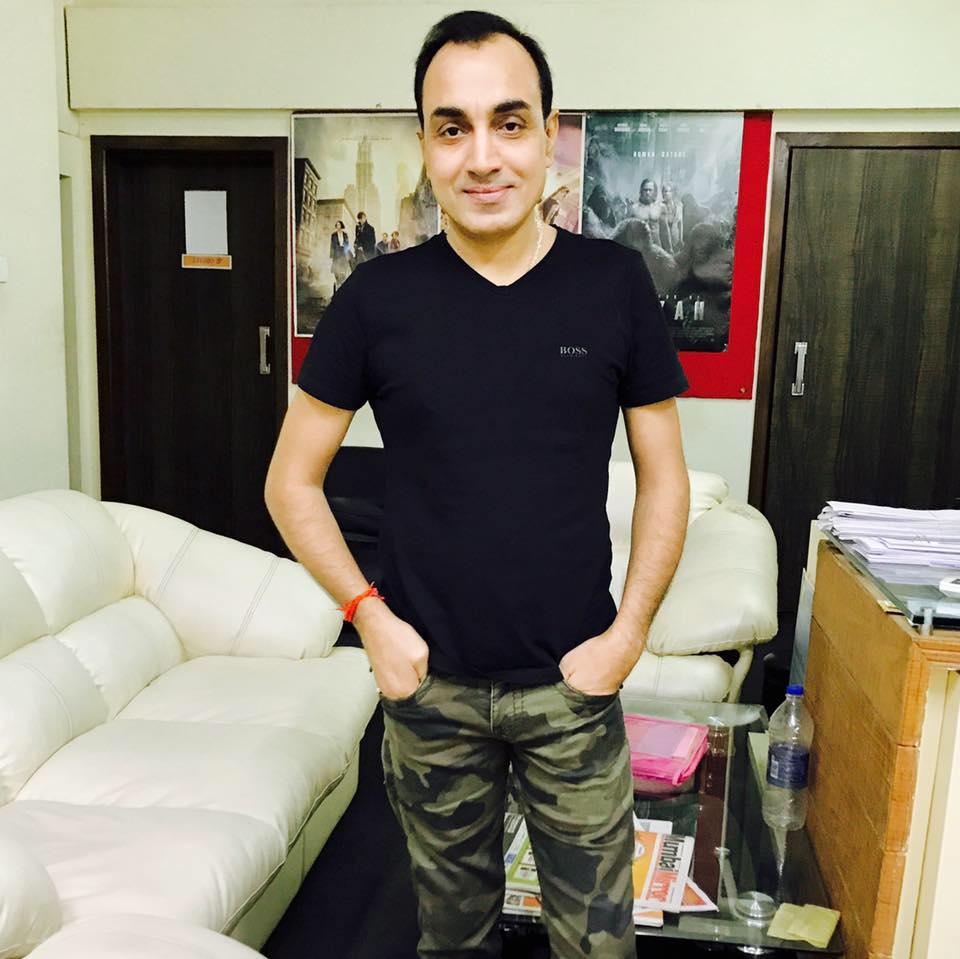
- Education: B.A. (Hons.) in History, Delhi University (1989-1992); Master's of Personnel Management, University of Pune (1992-1994); Diploma in Film Direction, ZICA Hyderabad (1997-1998)
- Occupations: Film Director, producer
- Years active: 1998 - Present
- Notable work: "Tom Dick and Harry," "Tom, Dick and Harry 2," "Push Scooter"

Narsingh Rajput (born 22 January 1970) is an Indian film director and producer known for his works in Hindi cinema's like Tom Dick and Harry.

== Early life and education ==
He spent his formative years in Varanasi & New Delhi. His educational journey began with a Bachelor of Arts (Hons.) in History from Delhi University, where he studied from 1989 to 1992. During his time at Delhi University, Narsingh Rajput furthered his education by pursuing a Master's of Personnel Management, which he earned from the University of Pune between 1992 and 1994.

== Filmography ==
- Na Tum Jaano Na Hum (2002) - Hindi,- as Production Controller
- Jodi Kya Banayi Wah Wah Ram Ji (2003) - Hindi,- as Production Controller
- Dulha Milal Dildaar (2005) - Bhojpuri, - as Executive Producer
- Fun – Can Be Dangerous Sometimes (2005) -Hindi,- as Executive Producer
- Vishwas (2006) - Marathi, - as Executive Producer
- Tom Dick and Harry (2006) - Hindi,- as Executive Producer
- Rama Rama Kya Hai Dramaaa (2008) - Hindi,- as Executive Producer
- Push Scooter (2018) - Hindi,- as Director
- Tom, Dick and Harry 2 (2021) - Hindi,- as Producer

== Television ==
- Amanat (TV Series) Zee TV
  - Assistant Director
- Challenge (TV Series) Sony TV
  - Assistant Director
- Kahani Saath Phero Ki (Daily Soap) DD1
  - Production Controller
