= Shyamoli Varma =

Indian model

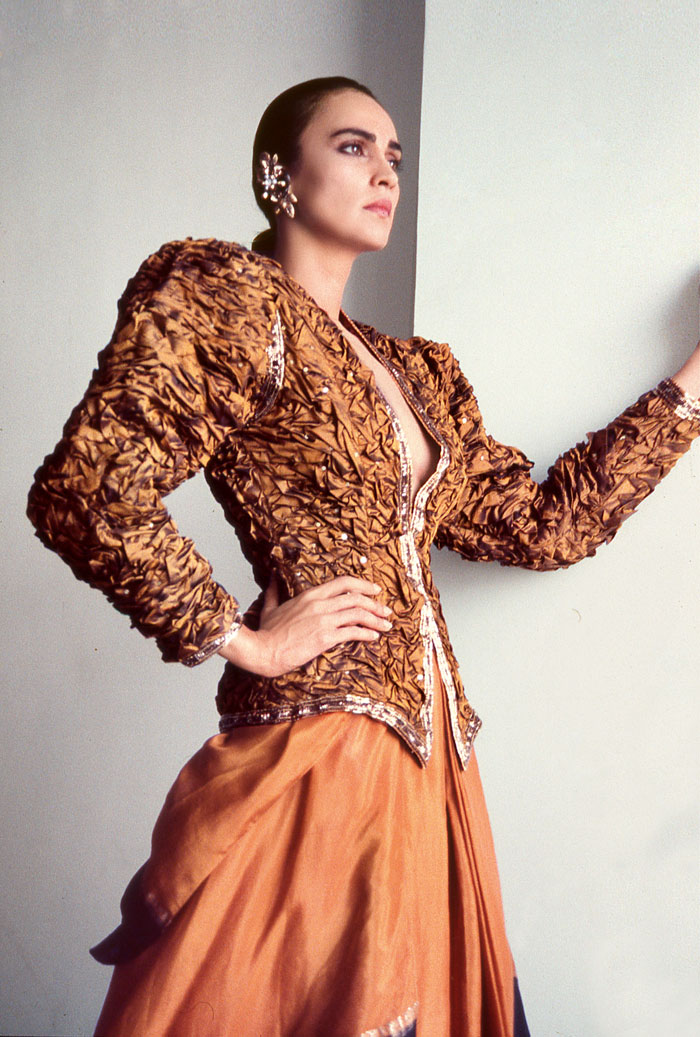
- Shyamoli Varma as featured in 2003 publication of Vogue India.
- Born: Shyamoli Varma; 11 December 1957 (age 68); Pune, Maharashtra, India
- Education: Sophia College for Women
- Occupations: Model; Actress
- Years active: 1982–2005
- Spouse: Abhijit Chaterjee
- Children: 1

Shyamoli Varma (born 11 December 1957), is a former Indian actress and model. She is known as India's first supermodel and the first Lakmé girl. Varma is also known for her role in the Indian thriller Rog and for her work with Lakmé Cosmetics. Following her work with Lakmé Cosmetics, Varma went on to live in Paris and model with fashion companies such as Pierre Cardin, Yves Saint Laurent, and Chanel.

== Early life ==
Varma was born into an Indian family on 11 December 11th 1953 in Pune, India. Her father was a lieutenant colonel in the Indian army and her mother was a housewife. She is of Bengali, Punjabi, and English descent. Varma has one brother who worked as a financial advisor in Melbourne. She studied educational psychology in college.

== Personal life ==
Varma married Abhijit Chaterji. She has a daughter, Akiksha, who got her Masters at the University of Washington in Seattle. Varma is fluent in English, Hindi, and French.

== Career ==
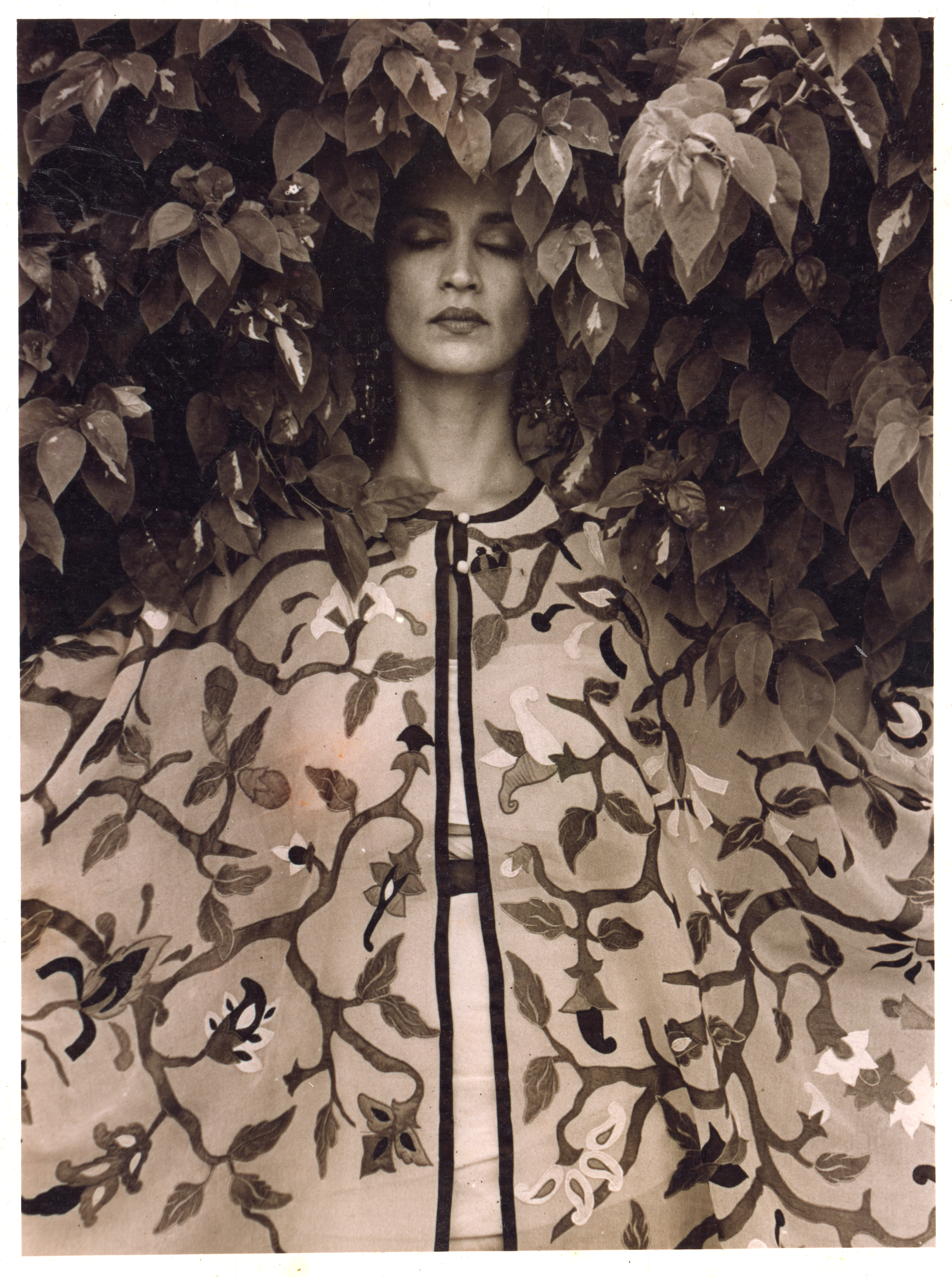
Image taken from 1998 publication of Vanguard. Photographed by Rohit Khosla

After graduating Sophia College for Women, she worked as a telephone operator in Pune before she was spotted by an assistant to fashion choreographer Jeannie Naoroji. She then signed on to a three-year modelling contract with Lakmé Cosmetics. Varma is known in India for this partnership and has been coined as the "Lakmé girl". She was used to advertise make-up products to an India that was relatively new to the world of cosmetics. Lakmé had to overcome a negative social taboo about cosmetics in India and market their products to a country of diverse complexions and skin tones. After a year in the modeling industry, Varma appeared in ads for Nescafé and on Doordarshan, a broadcasting network owned by the Indian government.

Following her work with Lakmé Cosmetics, she acquired a contract with Pierre Cardin and moved to Paris, France in 1980 to further her work in the fashion industry. Varma worked with Yves Saint Laurent, Chanel, Vogue, Maxim, Karl Lagerfeld, Max Mara, Comme des Garçons, and other top fashion companies. During her time in Paris, she was close with fellow Indian model Anjali Mendes and photographers Rohit Khosla and Azzedine Alaïa. She then moved back to Pune in 1989, where she began a career as a fashion choreographer. Since then, she has traveled around India, France, and Germany and has held 6 exhibitions. In the next two years, she choreographed shows for fashion institutes, designers and trade fairs. She continued on for 5 years until the birth of her daughter.

== Movies ==
Year	Title	Role	Language
1996	Kama Sutra: A Tale of Love	Rasa Devi's Courtesan	English
2001	Everybody Says I'm Fine!	Mrs. Mittal	English
2005	Rog	Shyamoli	Hindi
