= Thank You (2011 film) =

2011 Indian film by Anees Bazmee

- Theatrical release poster
- Directed by: Anees Bazmee
- Written by: Anees Bazmee; Rajan Aggarwal; Nisar Akhtar; Rajiv Kaul; Ikram Akhtar
- Produced by: Ronnie Screwvala; Twinkle Khanna
- Starring: Akshay Kumar; Bobby Deol; Suniel Shetty; Irrfan Khan; Sonam Kapoor Ahuja; Rimi Sen; Celina Jaitly
- Cinematography: Ravi Yadav
- Edited by: Steven H. Bernard
- Music by: Songs: Pritam; Score: Sandeep Shirodkar
- Production companies: UTV Motion Pictures; Hari Om Entertainment
- Distributed by: UTV Motion Pictures
- Release date: 8 April 2011
- Running time: 137 minutes
- Country: India
- Language: Hindi
- Budget: ₹60 crore
- Box office: ₹104 crore

Thank You is a 2011 Indian Hindi-language romantic comedy film written and directed by Anees Bazmee and produced jointly by Ronnie Screwvala and Twinkle Khanna under UTV Motion Pictures. The film stars Akshay Kumar, Bobby Deol, Suniel Shetty, Irrfan Khan, Sonam Kapoor, Rimi Sen and Celina Jaitly. Ranjeet, Mukesh Tiwari, Rakhee Tandon, Smita Jaykar, and Chahat Khanna are featured in supporting roles with Mallika Sherawat and Vidya Balan in special appearances.

Released on 8 April 2011, and conceptually similar to Bazmee's No Entry (2005), Thank You revolves around three married men and best friends at work who engage in philandering behaviour and run a yacht business, trying to have some fun outside their marriage. However, when suspicion plays its cards right on their wives, enlisted for help arrives private investigator Kishan Khurana, a detective who specializes in extramarital relationships. However, the course of events that follows Kishan's attempts to expose and reform the men takes twists and turns that are hard for him to deal with, and what follows suit forms the rest of the story. Most of the scenes in this film were shot in Vancouver, British Columbia, and Toronto, Ontario in Canada.

UTV Indiagames also released a mobile video game based on the film.

== Plot ==
Raj Malhotra, Vikram Chopra and Yogi Mathur are best friends who, as partners, own the Virgin Yacht Company in Toronto, and are all philanderers by nature. Their respective wives Sanjana Arora Malhotra, Shivani Chopra and Maya Mathur are also similarly best friends. While Raj and Vikram successfully get away with their flirtatious behaviour and remain loyal in the books of their seemingly unsuspecting wives, Yogi is known to have begun failing recently because of Maya's secret best friend who exposed him to her.

One day, as Sanjana bumps into Maya, she soon discovers that Raj might be lying to her; as they catch up with Shivani, she deduces that Raj is having an affair, while also suspecting that Vikram could follow in these footsteps, little aware that he is the unofficial "mastermind" of the trio. Maya then suggests to Sanjana that she meet Kishan, whom Shivani also seems to know. Kishan is revealed to be a private detective specializing in extramarital affairs, whose initial brushoff with Sanjana leads her to question his sensibilities until Maya points out he must have dug up dirt on Raj. Sanjana leaves unconvinced by Kishan's explanation, but he is determined to prove his point. At the New Year's Eve party, he summons all of Raj's girlfriends and nearly has him exposed to Sanjana, but Vikram steps in to save the day for Raj by convincing Yogi to play along.

Realizing someone is onto Raj, Vikram reaches out to his intelligence officer friend K.D., who declines to help but suggests hiring a private investigator. As fate would have it, they end up at Kishan's office, and recognize him from the party, completely unaware of his identity as Sanjana's informer. He offers to help them find the buster who assisted Sanjana, in reality intending to play a double game. He secretly records Yogi's confession to Sanjana about his affairs and doctors the audio with help from a voiceover artist, later showing the altered video to Raj and Vikram, who sabotage Yogi's hotel date with a woman named Sweety, who is to married soon, by tipping Maya; in the expose that follows, Yogi is flustered to find Raj and Vikram betrayed him. Later that evening, Kishan finally has Raj exposed through media stories of him meeting with another woman who was in fact set up by Kishan, along with her husband, to trap Raj in the fiasco; an on-the-run Raj later calls Vikram to a waterside spot the next morning, when Vikram finally comes up with an idea to project him as an undercover officer on a mission to destroy the dreaded criminal King, whose brother was recently killed — a feat attributed to Raj as part of the ploy. Sanjana ends up buying the story and forgives him, later snubbing Kishan over the exposé. Determined to prove his point, Kishan swears to find out the truth and later learns from drunk Yogi about the ploy; he later has Raj and Vikram completely drowned in alcohol and terrorizes them into a visit to a stadium masquerading as King. At the stadium, the duo are brought in blindfolded; Kishan, still posing as King, with Sanjana and Shivani in attendance, forces the duo to confess their affairs, causing Shivani to lose consciousness and Sanjana to burst into tears.

Sanjana attempts to commit suicide by jumping off a cliff, but Kishan vows to help her win back the Raj who she knew loved her. He brings Sanjana to her mother Trishna's home, where her younger sister Kanisha "Kuku" Arora also lives with them. Kuku and Kishan don't get along well, but she slowly begins to understand his motivations. After convincing Sanjana for a few actions which cast doubt on Vikram's assessment of Raj's new status in his marital relationship, Kishan strategically destroys Vikram by scheming with Shivani to have his property rights transferred to her; by additionally posing as Sanjana's boyfriend, he inadvertently brings Yogi closer to the duo since their fallout after both of them admit to their failures.

Greatly incensed over this troubling development, the three men reach out to Kishan again. He throws a cunningly coded hint about their respective enemies being a single person instead of different individuals, but they are still not aware of his role and merely leave trusting him to find the culprit. After a wild goose chase where the men chase Kishan, believing him to be King as misleadingly indicated by Kishan himself, ends in a disaster once they approach King's suspicious wife Maddy only to find out he is not Sanjana's boyfriend although Maddy later shoots him left, right and centre for flirting with another woman, they shockingly discover in a twist while waiting for him at his office that Kishan is the "three—in—one" miscreant in their lives. Meanwhile, Kishan arrives just in time to find himself exposed, but when the trio is about to beat him up, Sanjana intervenes and openly defends Kishan. Flustered, Raj announces that he now intends to divorce Sanjana, shocking everyone including Kishan. A few days later, the three men are completely drunk when they are visited by Shivani, Maya and Kishan announcing Sanjana's remarriage; under the mistaken impression that the groom is Kishan, they create a brief ruckus which ultimately ends in Vikram smashing a police officer's head, leading to the trio getting arrested.

While in prison, Raj rues about how he wronged Sanjana, just when they are bailed out by King, who offers Raj a pistol to shoot Kishan dead. Vikram and Yogi try their best to stop him, but it is too late, as Raj later shoots Kishan, causing Sanjana to burst out in anger. Raj quickly realizes that the groom wasn't Kishan but himself, when Kishan reveals he is alive; the gun King gave Raj was real, but the bullets were fake, it being part of Kishan's plan to bring Raj to the altar. Shivani, Maya and Trishna ask Kishan what pushed him to such dangerous limits to help women like Sanjana; he initially hesitates, but gives in to Raj's prodding and narrates his past, wherein he was also once a womanizer but was forced to mend his ways after his wife Divya committed suicide. Since then, he has had embarked on a mission to help multiple destitute women who were facing a similar situation with their philandering husbands, though it was Sanjana who reminded him of Divya the most. As Raj and Sanjana remarry, while Yogi and Maya also reconcile, Kishan advises Vikram to apologize to Shivani, who ultimately forgives him.

Halfway through the ceremony, Kuku asks Trishna where Kishan is; she replies and implies he has moved on to help "another Sanjana". The story ends with him walking away playing the flute as he wanders the streets.

== Cast ==
- Akshay Kumar as Kishan Khurana
- Suniel Shetty as Yogi Mathur
- Bobby Deol as Raj Malhotra
- Irrfan Khan as Vikram Chopra
- Sonam Kapoor as Sanjana A. Malhotra, Raj's wife
- Celina Jaitly as Maya Mathur, Yogi's wife
- Rimi Sen as Shivani Chopra, Vikram's wife
- Mukesh Tiwari as King
- Rakhee Tandon as Maddy, King's wife
- Ranjeet as T.T.
- Chahat Khanna as Kanisha "Kuku" Arora, Sanjana's sister
- Smita Jaykar as Trishna Arora, Sanjana's mother
- Shillpi Sharma as Sweety
- Mallika Sherawat in a friendly song appearance as Razia
- Vidya Balan in a special appearance as Divya Khurana, Kishan's late wife
- Lilly Singh as a Bhangra dancer (in an uncredited cameo in the climax scene)

== Production ==
Sonam Kapoor replaced Katrina Kaif as the lead actress, since Bazmee wanted to have a change with Kumar's love interest. The film was shot at different locations in Vancouver, Toronto and Bangkok. It was made on a budget of ₹ 500 million, while an additional amount of ₹ 80 million was spent on promotions.

Thank You marked the final film for Vikas Bahl as creative producer for UTV; he quit production duties at UTV to debut as a writer and director with the UTV Spotboy film Chillar Party later in 2011.

== Soundtrack ==
Thank You

Soundtrack album by Pritam
- Released: 3 March 2011
- Genre: Film soundtrack
- Label: T-Series
- Producer: Pritam

Pritam chronology
United Six (2011)	Thank You (2011)	Dum Maaro Dum (2011)

The film's soundtrack was composed by Pritam. The lyrics were penned by Kumaar, Ashish Pandit and Amitabh Bhattacharya. The song "Pyaar Do Pyaar Lo" is originally taken from the film Janbaaz, and is the first remake of the song, the second being "Ek Toh Kum Zindagani" by Tanishk Bagchi for Marjaavaan. An additional song "Viah Di Raat (Khushiyan Da Mela)" was used in the film but has not been included in the soundtrack album.

The film score is composed by Sandeep Shirodkar.

=== Track listing ===
No.	Title	Lyrics	Singer(s)	Length
1.	"Pyaar Do Pyaar Lo"	Amitabh Bhattacharya	Mika Singh	5:15
2.	"Razia"	Ashish Pandit	Master Saleem, Ritu Pathak	4:54
3.	"Full Volume"	Kumaar	Neeraj Shridhar, Richa Sharma, Suzanne D'Mello	4:07
4.	"My Heart Is Beating"	Kumaar	Sonu Nigam	3:54
5.	"Pyaar Mein"	Amitabh Bhattacharya	Neeraj Shridhar, Javed Ali	4:37
6.	"Haan Har Ghadi"	Ashish Pandit	Javed Ali, Priyani Vani
7.	"Khushiyan Da Mela"	Ashish Pandit	Shahid Mallya
8.	"Pyaar Do Pyaar Lo" (Remix by Abhijit Vaghani)	Amitabh Bhattacharya	Mika Singh	4:39
9.	"Razia" (Remix by Abhijit Vaghani)	Ashish Pandit	Master Saleem, Ritu Pathak	4:26
10.	"Full Volume" (Remix by Harry Anand)	Kumaar	Neeraj Shridhar, Richa Sharma	4:25
11.	"My Heart Is Beating" (Remix by Harry Anand)	Kumaar	Sonu Nigam	4:44

== Reception ==
=== Critical ===
Though earning more than INR 1 billion and emerging as a commercial success, Thank You opened to negative reviews from critics. Taran Adarsh of Bollywood Hungama rated the film with 2/5 Stars saying, "What could've been an honest take on dishonesty fails to leave a mark eventually". Rajeev Masand of CNN-IBN gave the film one star and stated, "Badly scripted, shoddily photographed and embarrassingly performed, Thank You is one of those rare films that gets absolutely nothing right." Anupama Chopra of NDTV gave one and a half stars and commented, "My brains were battered to pulp and my eardrums are still recovering from Pritam's cacophonous sound-track." Nikhat Kazmi of the Times of India awarded two and a half stars saying, "You have a film that can be an average weekend getaway. Nothing more, not even Mallika Sherawat's item number."

=== Box office ===
Thank You had a below average opening of ₹ 50 million according to Box Office India. It showed a 20% increase on Saturday, bringing the two-day total to ₹ 110 million nett. The film grossed approximately ₹ 320 million by the end of the weekend and ₹ 520 million nett by the end of its first week. It raked in ₹ 112.5 million in its second week taking the total to ₹ 400 million net. The film netted a total of ₹ 600 million in India taking its worldwide total ₹ 1.08 billion. The film was declared average by BoxofficeIndia.com. The film however managed to recover 90% of its cost through the sale of satellite, music and territorial rights. The satellite and music rights were sold to Colors and T-Series respectively for a sum of ₹ 300 million.
