= Main Zaroor Aaunga =

2019 Indian film

- Theatrical release poster
- Directed by: Chandrakant Singh
- Written by: M. Salim
- Produced by: Mahendra Singh Namdev
- Starring: Arbaaz Khan; Aindrita Ray; Vikas Verma
- Cinematography: Johny Lall
- Edited by: Aashish Gaikar
- Music by: Songs: Rajendra Shiv; Sandeep Batraa; Score: AMS
- Production company: AShirwad CineVision Pvt Ltd
- Release date: 27 September 2019
- Country: India
- Language: Hindi

Main Zaroor Aaunga (transl. I will definitely come) is a 2019 Indian Hindi-language horror drama film directed by Chandrakant Singh. Starring Arbaaz Khan, Aindrita Ray and Vikas Verma. It was released theatrically on 27 September 2019.

== Synopsis ==
Yash Malhotra (Arbaaz Khan), a wealthy businessman residing in Switzerland, owns vast properties and lives a life of luxury. He falls in love with Lisa (Aindrita Ray), a glamorous model. While Yash dreams of starting a family, Lisa is too focused on her career to consider motherhood, creating tension between them. Confiding in her boyfriend Peter (Vikas Verma), Lisa drifts further away from Yash.

One day, Yash discovers Lisa and Peter together. A violent confrontation follows, ending with Yash’s death. Panicked, Lisa and Peter enlist grave digger Lobo to bury the body, then approach a locksmith to duplicate Yash’s safe deposit key and real estate broker Rajesh to liquidate his properties. Their plan: sell everything, gather Yash’s valuables, and flee to India.

But Inspector Shiv (Govind Namdev) thwarts their scheme. He reveals that Lobo, the locksmith, and Rajesh have all died mysteriously, and confiscates the passports of Lisa, Peter, and the house help Tiwari (Hemant Pandey), trapping them in Switzerland.

As paranoia sets in, Lisa and Peter begin to believe Yash is still alive, haunting them. Tensions escalate until Peter, desperate to escape, clashes with Lisa. Their fight ends in Peter’s accidental death. Terrified, Lisa attempts to dispose of his body just as she did with Yash’s.

The mystery deepens: Can Lisa cover up Peter’s death? Will she escape justice? And is Yash truly gone—or has he returned?

== Cast ==
- Arbaaz Khan as Yash Malhotra
- Aindrita Ray as Lisa
- Vikas Verma as Peter
- Govind Namdev as Police Inspector
- Hemant Pandey as Tiwari
- Vineet Verma
- Ali Shah
- Jeba Baig

== Production ==
Main Zaroor Aaunga was entirely shot in Switzerland from start to finish unlike many Indian films which only shoot a few scenes there. Govind Namdev plays a detective in the film.

== Soundtrack ==
Track listing
No.	Title	Lyrics	Music	Singer(s)	Length
1.	"Main Zaroor Aaunga"	Abhendra Kumar Upadhyay	Rajendra Shiv	Mohammed Irfan	2:59
2.	"Saanson Mein Simat Jao"	Azeem Shirazi	Sandeep Batraa	Sandeep Batraa, Tripty Sinha	4:53

== Reception ==
=== Critical response ===
Pooja Raisinghani from The Times of India wrote "Although the film aims to mix the genre of horror with thriller, Main Zaroor Aaunga fails to both, thrill and scare the audience, and you may not end up admiring anything but the snowclad mountains in the background". Kunal Guha from Mumbai Mirror wrote "But this one seems to be put together possibly to corroborate a devious tax fraud-of-sorts. But if you're prepared to brave severed heads being tossed like volleyballs, milk tea magically turning into blood and other hilarious gaffes, this one's a must-watch". A reviewer of Mayapuri said, "There is nothing in the film to motivate the audience to watch the film". Kunal Guha of Bangalore Mirror gave the movie 1/5 stars and wrote "Arbaaz Khan's thriller offers more grins than thrills". Omair Iqbal of The Live Mirror gave the movie 1/5 stars and wrote "Arbaaz Khan film fails to thrill and scare". Prokerala.com gave the movie 2/5 stars. Filminformation.com wrote "On the whole, Main Zaroor Aaunga may have a definitiveness in its title but what’s even more definite is that it will be rejected by the paying public because it’s a poor show all the way".
