= Be Careful (film) =

- Film poster
- Directed by: Chandrakant Singh
- Written by: Mohammed Salim
- Produced by: Bhushan Kumar; Krishan Kumar; Mohanlal Mundhra
- Starring: Rajneesh Duggal; Tanishaa; Nancy Rai; Zaid Hameed; Rajpal Yadav; Johnny Lever; Shakti Kapoor; Sanjai Mishra; Tiku Talsania; Hemant Pandey
- Edited by: Irfan Shaikh
- Music by: Siddharrth & Suhas
- Production companies: T-Series Films; United Color Entertainment
- Distributed by: Mirchi Movies
- Release date: 21 October 2011
- Country: India
- Language: Hindi

Be Careful is a Bollywood film that was released in the end of October 2011. The movie was directed by Chandrakant Singh and starred Rajneesh Duggal, Tanishaa, Kiran Rathod, Zaid Hameed, Shillpi Sharma, while the other members from the cast included Rajpal Yadav, Asrani, Shakti Kapoor, Sanjay Mishra, Tiku Talsania.

== Plot ==
Sameer (Sam) and Anand (Andy) are childhood friends. From their school days and even in college, they studied together. Both were ahead in studies as well as in sports. They were also the champions when it came to girl-chasing. In fact they used to bet amongst themselves as to who will but it never lead to any fighting between them. For them the meaning of love was sex!

Then came two girls in their life, Anjali and Kiran. Sam & Andy both tried to flirt with them but the girls were smart. They told the guys that both are virgins and will offer their virginity to their husbands as a gift. Sam and Andy had to marry the girls under pressure.

Post to their marriage the girls revealed that they knew about the guys' college activities, and now Sam and Andy should lead their lives as dutiful husbands.

The wives have become a problem for both of them.

The wives plan their whole Bangkok trip for one month, right from the hotel booking to the menu for their breakfast, dinner, and lunch. The credit/debit cards are kept with the wives and husbands are given only the pocket money.

After facing all such troubles, they finally reach Bangkok and feel some freedom. On reaching the hotel they come to know the management is handled by Mr. Pandit who has made strict rules and regulations for the hotel staff and visitors. In other words, no matter what else happens in Bangkok, hotel will not allow anything illegal or immoral.

Sam & Andy felt this is no better than back home with wives around and feel helpless.

There they meet a beautiful sexy girl named Kavita, who calls herself Poem. Both of them get attracted to her and bet again as to who will get her in bed first.

Both of them somehow succeed in befriending Poem but tell lies about Poem to each other. But somehow their wives also land up in Bangkok and what transpires next makes the film a sequence of comic events. What will Sam and Andy do now? Will their wives catch them red-handed and will they be thrown out of their father's businesses?

== Cast ==
- Rajneesh Duggal as Sameer Malhotra
- Tanishaa as Anjali
- Kiran Rathod as Kiran
- Shillpi Sharma as Kavita
- Johnny Lever as Lobo
- Rajpal Yadav as Pandit
- Asrani as Mr. Malhotra
- Tiku Talsania as Mr. Kapoor
- Sanjay Mishra as Tiwari
- Hemant Pandey as Peon
- Dinesh Hingoo

== Soundtrack ==
Songs are composed by Siddharth & Suhas and lyrics are by Kumar

1. Love Technology - Shahid Mallya, Shashaa Tirupati

2. Fursat - Hamza Faruqui

3. Be My Maahiya - Shashaa Tirupati

4. Be-Careful - Suhas Shetty

5. Love Technology (Partymap Mix) - Shahid Mallya, Sasha Tirupati
