= Camille and Kennerly Kitt =

American twin actresses and harpists

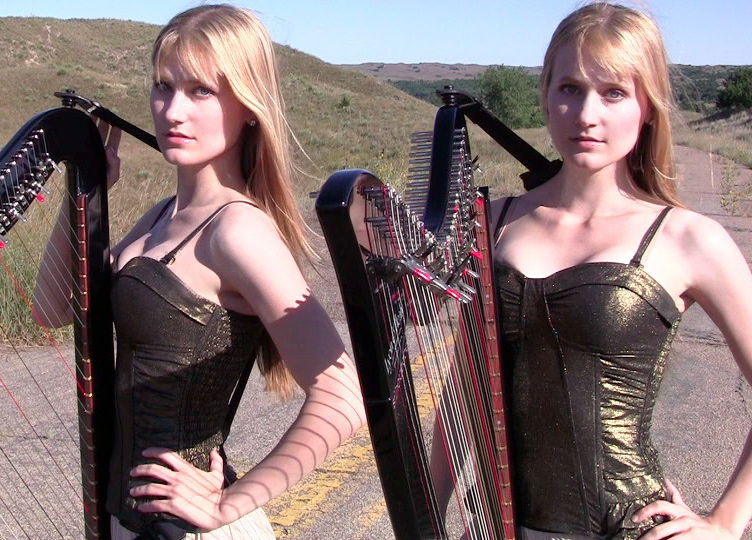
- Promo picture for an electric harp duet video
- Other names: Camille and Kennerly; Harp Twins; Kitt Twins
- Education: Wheaton College (B.M.)
- Occupations: Harpists; actresses; arrangers
- Years active: 2009–present

Instagram information
- Page: camillekennerly
- Followers: 84.3 thousand

X information
- Handle: @HarpTwins
- Followers: 15.3 thousand

YouTube information
- Channel: Camille and Kennerly
- Genre: Music
- Subscribers: 830 thousand
- Views: 176 million
- Last updated: April 14, 2026
- Website: Official Website

Camille Karie and Kennerly Caye Kitt are American harpists, who compose, arrange, and perform as The Harp Twins. The Kitt sisters have released over 100 singles online, as well as nine physical albums of both covers and original songs. They have appeared in several films.

== Biography ==
Camille and Kennerly Kitt are of Norwegian, Swedish and Finnish descent. The identical twins began playing piano as children, followed by the harp in junior high school. They earned money for their first harp by taking on jobs such as babysitting and dog-walking in order to show their mom they were serious about playing the harp. Their first harp was a used lever harp.

Both Camille and Kennerly hold Bachelor of Music degrees in Harp Performance and graduated with highest honors from Wheaton College Conservatory of Music. Although they are classically trained, their true musical passion is arranging and performing contemporary music for harp duet. They are also third-degree black belts in Taekwondo, and are former Taekwondo instructors. While sparring, Kennerly broke two of her fingers, while Camille required stitches in her face as the result of a puncture wound sustained while holding a board that Kennerly was breaking. These incidents made them decide to stop practicing martial arts, focusing on the harp instead.

== Musical career ==
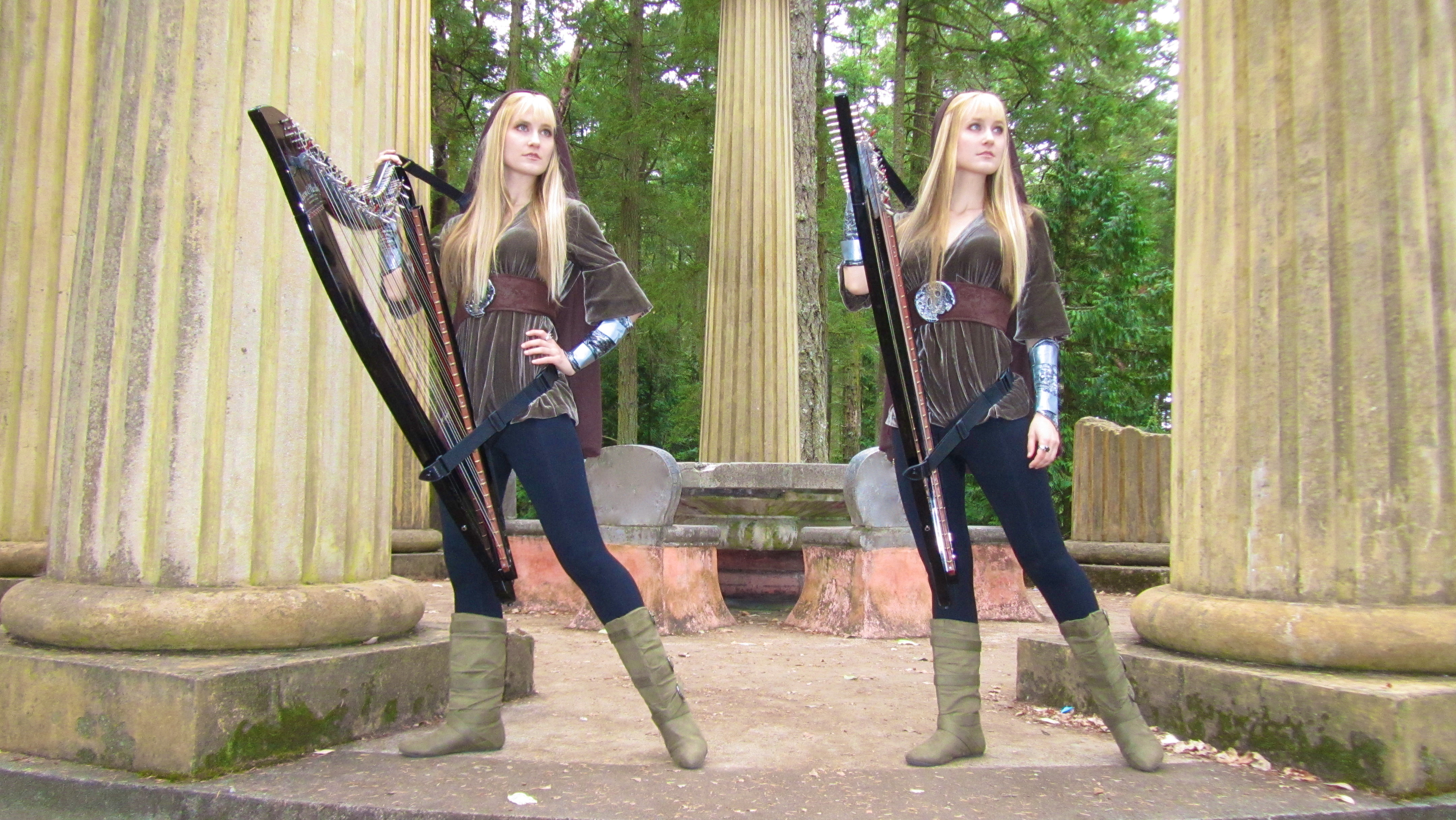
Camille and Kennerly dressed as elves while filming a video for their Lord of the Rings soundtrack medley

Camille and Kennerly perform as the rock and Celtic harp duo the Harp Twins; they are best known for their duet arrangements of contemporary songs from artists including Iron Maiden, Kansas, The Rolling Stones, Metallica, Lady Gaga, Pink Floyd, Aerosmith, Rihanna, Guns N' Roses, Coldplay, Enya and Journey, as well as musical scores for video games, films, and television.

Bailey Johnson, writing at the CBS News "Feed Blog", described their arrangement of The Cranberries' "Zombie" as "elegant, wistful and an excellent tribute". Huffington Post arts reporter Mallika Rao said of their Game of Thrones theme arrangement: "Yes, there have been other attempts to cover Ramin Djawadi's haunting tune before, but this one is now the only one." Megan Bledsoe, in her Doctorate of Musical Arts in Harp Performance dissertation remarks that while groups like Harptallica and the Harp Twins provide a new perspective on previous instrumentation choices within these genres, "the resulting sound of these ensembles, which very closely resembles any harp duet throughout history ... ultimately perpetuates the angelic, calm, feminine stereotypes of the instrument." United Kingdom-based heavy metal music magazine Metal Hammer has an alternative assessment of the Harp Twins. In a "Hot New Band" feature on the Harp Twins entitled "Harp Attack", Metal Hammer remarks: "Rather than turn their attention to obvious, classically grounded territory, The Harp Twins have made a name for themselves covering the likes of Iron Maiden, offering classics like Fear of the Dark a fascinating new lease on life." Ahead of a concert tour in the summer of 2022, they started work with a set of death metal performers, the Volfgang Twins, moving increasingly into a binary light-dark alignment.

In October 2014, Camille and Kennerly represented the United States and performed at the 8th annual World Harp Festival, in Asunción, Paraguay, which brought together more than 30 national and international artists.

Camille and Kennerly perform on Venus "Classic" Concert Grand pedal harps and Lyon & Healy "Silhouette" Electric lever harps.

== Acting ==
Camille and Kennerly portrayed "The Merry Christians" in the film Politics of Love, directed by William Dear, and "The Marcelli Twins" in the dark teen comedy blacktino, produced by Elizabeth Avellan. Camille and Kennerly can be seen in the trailer for blacktino. Additionally, the Harp Twins had minor roles in Delivery Man, starring Vince Vaughn and appeared in the season six finale of The Walking Dead.

== Discography ==
=== Albums ===
- Harp Attack (December 2013). Harp covers of rock and metal songs.

Track	Length
1. Fear of the Dark	6:22
2. Send Me an Angel	4:20
3. Nothing Else Matters	5:33
4. Paint It Black	3:35
5. Don't Fear the Reaper	4:19
6. It's My Life	2:32
7. Smoke on the Water	3:33
8. Wish You Were Here	3:22
9. Zombie	2:11
10. With or Without You	3:04
11. Sweet Child O' Mine	2:36
12. Highway to Hell	2:21
13. Stairway to Heaven	4:05
14. Dream On	3:47

- Harp Fantasy (December 2013). Harp covers of video game, anime, film and television soundtracks.

Track	Length
1. Game of Thrones Main Title	1:48
2. Star Trek Main Title	2:00
3. Misty Mountains (From The Hobbit)	1:43
4. Mario: Rainbow Road / Dire Dire Docks	2:48
5. Doctor Who Theme	2:02
6. The Rains of Castamere (From Game of Thrones)	2:45
7. Saint Seiya: Mime's Requiem / Abel's Harp	2:45
8. The Walking Dead Theme	1:38
9. Final Fantasy: Prelude / To Zanarkand	3:40
10. Silent Hill: Promise (Reprise) / Not Tomorrow	4:56
11. The Legend of Zelda: Ballad of the Goddess	1:44
12. Hedwig's Theme (From Harry Potter)	2:36
13. Skyrim Main Theme (Dragonborn)	3:04
14. Lord of the Rings Medley	5:14

- Harp Attack 2 (February 2015). Harp covers of rock and metal songs.

Track	Length
1. Dance of Death	7:12
2. Hotel California	4:57
3. Eye of the Tiger	2:40
4. The Unforgiven	4:58
5. Every Breath You Take	3:32
6. House of the Rising Sun	3:04
7. A Tout Le Monde	4:03
8. My Immortal	4:03
9. Sweet Dreams (Are Made of This)	3:39
10. Rhiannon	3:12
11. Crazy Train	4:39
12. The Bard's Song (In the Forest)	3:38
13. Carry On Wayward Son	3:16
14. Don't Stop Believin'	2:23
15. Hotel California (feat. Sonido Urbano & Kevin Bartlett)	5:08

- Harp Fantasy 2 (May 2016). Harp covers of video game, anime, film and television soundtracks.

Track	Length
1. Pirates of the Caribbean	3:34
2. The Imperial March (From Star Wars)	1:59
3. Now We Are Free (From Gladiator)	2:57
4. Lost Woods (From The Legend of Zelda)	2:20
5. Big Bang Theory Theme	1:41
6. Elwynn Forest (From World of Warcraft)	2:24
7. If I Had a Heart (From Vikings)	3:10
8. Sailor Moon Theme: Moonlight Densetsu	3:15
9. My Heart Will Go On (From Titanic)	4:29
10. The Hanging Tree (From The Hunger Games)	3:24
11. My Little Pony Theme: Friendship Is Magic	1:58
12. Downton Abbey Theme	3:25
13. Into the West (From The Lord of the Rings)	4:25
14. Star Wars	3:31

- Winter Lights (2017)
- Harp Attack 3 (2018)
- Iceborn (2020)
- Harp Reflections (2020)
- Harp Attack 4 (2021)
- Twin Destinies (2022)
- Twin Fantasy 3 (2023)
- Celtic Charms (2024)
- Ice Storm (2025)
- Nordic Nights (2025)
- Forever (2026)

=== Single releases ===
The Harp Twins have released many of their harp duet performances in online stores and as online videos.

Here is a partial list.

Release date	Track
June 28, 2012	Sweet Child O' Mine
July 9, 2012	Highway to Hell
July 9, 2012	Zombie
July 9, 2012	Game of Thrones
July 9, 2012	Stairway to Heaven
November 7, 2012	Skyrim Main Theme (Dragonborn)
November 7, 2012	The Legend of Zelda: Skyward Sword (Ballad of the Goddess)
November 7, 2012	Greensleeves
November 7, 2012	Silent Night
November 7, 2012	O Holy Night
November 7, 2012	Nothing Else Matters
November 7, 2012	Final Fantasy: Prelude / To Zanarkand
December 4, 2012	The First Noel
December 4, 2012	Carol of the Bells
January 8, 2013	Paint It Black
January 26, 2013	Misty Mountains Cold (from "The Hobbit")
February 5, 2013	The Walking Dead Theme
February 27, 2013	Fear of the Dark
March 20, 2013	Doctor Who Theme
April 6, 2013	The Rains of Castamere - Game of Thrones
May 15, 2013	Star Trek: The Next Generation (Main Title)
May 25, 2013	With or Without You
May 25, 2013	Wish You Were Here
May 25, 2013	It's My Life
May 25, 2013	Dream On
May 25, 2013	Don't Fear the Reaper
June 20, 2013	Scarborough Fair
July 6, 2013	Pachelbel's Canon in D
July 9, 2013	Send Me an Angel
July 30, 2013	Saint Seiya: Mime's Requiem / Abel's Harp
August 19, 2013	Smoke On the Water
September 11, 2013	Rainbow Road / Dire Dire Docks (from "Mario Kart" and "Super Mario 64")
October 9, 2013	Amazing Grace
October 21, 2013	Sweet Dreams (Are Made of This)
November 12, 2013	The Lord of the Rings
December 23, 2013	Downton Abbey Theme
January 13, 2014	Eye of the Tiger
February 9, 2014	Every Breath You Take
February 27, 2014	Hedwig's Theme (From "Harry Potter")
March 25, 2014	The House of the Rising Sun
April 21, 2014	Promise (Reprise) / Not Tomorrow (from Silent Hill)
May 13, 2014	Dance of Death
July 26, 2014	Crazy Train
August 20, 2014	Star Wars
September 22, 2014	Hotel California
November 11, 2014	Don't Stop Believing
November 22, 2014	The Bard's Song
January 20, 2015	The Hanging Tree
February 13, 2015	A Tout le Monde
April 6, 2015	Girls Just Wanna Have Fun

== Filmography ==
Camille and Kennerly have appeared in several full-length and short films.

- Delivery Man (2013)
- Politics of Love (2011)
- blacktino (2011)
- T is for Twine (2011)
- Super Force 5 (2010)
- Elephant Medicine (2010)
- Inside America (2009)
- The End of Lost Beginnings (2009)
- Lost Along the Way (2008)
