= Politics of Love =

2011 American romantic comedy film

- Directed by: William Dear
- Written by: Gary Goldstein
- Produced by: Govind Menon; William Sees Keenan
- Starring: Mallika Sherawat; Brian J. White; Loretta Devine; Gerry Bednob; Ruby Dee
- Music by: Dylan Berry
- Release date: August 26, 2011
- Running time: 93 minutes
- Country: United States
- Language: English

Politics of Love (also known as Love Barack) is a 2011 romantic comedy film directed by William Dear. Bollywood actress Mallika Sherawat and American actor Brian J. White play leading roles.

== Plot ==
The film involves the unexpected romance that develops between an Indian-American, Democratic campaign worker Aritha (formerly Rithika) Gupta (Mallika Sherawat) who falls for an African-American Republican Kyle Franklin (Brian White) in the month leading up to the 2008 U.S. Presidential Election.

== Cast ==
- Brian J. White as Kyle Franklin
- Mallika Sherawat as Aretha Gupta
- Loretta Devine as Shirlee Gupta
- Ruby Dee as Grandma 'Estelle' Roseanne Gupta
- Gerry Bednob as Vijay Gupta
- Gabrielle Dennis as Chelsea
- Will Keenan as Terrence Miller
- Sueann Han as Bianca
- Ian Reed Kesler as Brent Murphy
- Tracey Walter as Glen
- Camille Kitt as Merry Christian
- Kennerly Kitt as Merry Christian
- Carlene Moore as Kathleen

== Release and box office ==
Politics of Love was released in US theaters on August 26, followed by its digital distribution on demand from September 3, 2011.

== Review ==
Politics of Love is amusing entertainment according to the Los Angeles Times. Politics of Love is a light and amusing fun movie. Mallika Sherawat was panned for her performance in this film, quoted as "trying too hard".
