= Manish Makhija =

Indian video jockey

- Born: 7 October 1968 (age 57); Delhi, India
- Other name: Munish Makhija
- Occupation: Video jockey
- Years active: 1997–present
- Known for: Udham Singh (Channel V)
- Spouse: Pooja Bhatt (m. 2003; div. 2014)
- Relatives: Masumeh Makhija (niece)

Manish Makhija (7 October 1968), sometimes spelled Munish Makhija, is an Indian video jockey who is most known for his characters Udham Singh on Channel V's The Udham Singh Show (1997), and Munna on UTV Bindass's Cash Cab – Meter Chalu Hai.

== Early life and education ==
Makhija was born and brought up in Delhi where his father and mother worked for the Indian Postal Department.

He received his B.A. political science degree from Delhi's Kirori Mal College. He subsequently studied for an L.L.B. at Delhi University, but dropped out.

== Career ==
Makhija first gained popularity with Channel V show, 'The Udham Singh Show', where he anchored the show as Udham Singh in Hariyanvi style. The show started as an offshoot of an ad campaign launched by the channel during the general elections in the late 1990sz asking youngsters to cast their vote. Later a campaign to persuade watchers to vote for the Viewers' Choice Award, featured a caricature of a Haryanvi Jat election officer from Meham in Haryana.

In 2003, he started working alongside Pooja Bhatt in her directorial debut Paap (2004), for which he sourced two soundtracks from the Pakistani band, Junoon. Then he appeared in small roles in films like Rog and Dhoka (2007), and he assisted her in Rog (2005).

Later in 2008, he also hosted a reality quiz show for UTV Bindass called Cash Cab – Meter Chalu Hai.

He was also featured in the film Luv Shuv Tey Chicken Khurana in the role of a local mafia figure in the UK.

== Personal life ==
In August 2003 Makhija married Pooja Bhatt, whom he had met a few months earlier while working with her in her film Paap (2003), in which he also had a small role. In December 2014 the couple separated.

== Awards and nominations ==
| Year | Category | Song and Film | Result | Ref. |
|---|---|---|---|---|
Screen Awards
| 1998 | Special Award | | Won | |
Mirchi Music Awards
| 2012 | Upcoming Lyricist of The Year | "Abhi Abhi" from Jism 2 | Nominated | |
