= Rog =

- Directed by: Himanshu Brahmbhatt
- Written by: Mahesh Bhatt
- Story by: Mahesh Bhatt
- Produced by: Pooja Bhatt
- Starring: Irrfan Khan; Ilene Hamann; Himanshu Malik
- Cinematography: Anshuman Mahaley
- Edited by: Akiv Ali
- Music by: M. M. Kreem
- Distributed by: Shreya Creations
- Release date: 7 January 2005
- Running time: 115 minutes
- Country: India
- Language: Hindi

Rog (transl. Malady) is a 2005 Indian Hindi-language romantic thriller film directed by Himanshu Brahmbhatt, written by Mahesh Bhatt and produced by Pooja Bhatt. Based on the Hollywood thriller Laura (1944), the film stars Irrfan Khan, Himanshu Malik and Ilene Hamann.

== Plot ==
Uday Singh Rathod is a law-abiding but troubled police officer, famous for his extraordinary investigations. He is experiencing insomnia. When Maya Solomon, a famous model, is murdered, Rathod is given custody of the case, and he is asked to solve it within a week by the Dy Commissioner Kumar. Three people are shortlisted as prime suspects: Harsh, a famous journalist; Ali, a millionaire; and Shyamoli, Ali's partner.

When the investigation begins, Harsh offers Rathod help in hunting down the murderer while drawing his attention to the fact that Maya was about to marry Ali, but because Ali was a womanizer and couldn't keep up with one woman. So Ali, along with Shyamoli, killed Maya. Rathod theorizes on these lines and goes to Ali's house with Harsh.

He questions Ali and reaches Maya's house to gather further evidence on the case. While leading the investigations and running through Maya's past, Rathod starts to fall in love with the image of the dead woman. One night, to his shock, as he is gathering evidence in her house, Maya appears suddenly. This leaves Rathod confused about the dead body found in the house and forces him to reconsider the suspects.

All this while, Maya's simplicity and subtle beauty keep drawing Rathod towards her. He interrogates Maya, whereupon she reveals that before the night of the murder, she left for a two-day holiday. Ali, meanwhile, used duplicate keys to bring another girl Neena to spend the night at Maya's house. Neena was killed, but Ali wasn't involved in the killing. Rathod tells Maya that due to lack of evidence, all suspicions fall on her and that she could be prosecuted for the crime. Rathod thinks for a few moments and tells Maya that regardless of everyone's opinion, he thinks she is innocent. He advises her to flee, offering to make all arrangements. She refuses to leave.

Maya, seeing Rathod's helpful nature and his faith in her, starts falling in love with him. They both get out of the interrogation room and spend the night together. In the morning, Rathod visits Maya's house one last time to recover the murder weapon, hoping that it would help clarify things. He is able to retrieve the weapon and happens to realize the identity of the actual murderer. He goes back to the house, only to find Harsh already there, trying to kill Maya. After some resistance, Rathod gets hold of Harsh and holds him down, immersed in the bathtub. However, Harsh, in a final attempt, leaps out of the bathtub and flashes a knife at Rathod. Maya appears behind Harsh and shoots him to death.

It is later revealed that Maya was conscious of her beauty because wherever she went instead of getting to know her, people hit on her. What she was looking for were trust and faith. When she met Harsh, he offered her his riches but couldn't offer faith. She got disappointed and started having an affair with Ali, who turned out unfaithful and broke her trust. Things continued the way they were, and she almost considered marrying Ali, until Harsh attempted to kill Maya but ended up killing the other girl, Neena, who accompanied Ali that night to Maya's place. In the end, Rathod is congratulated by fellow policemen as he gazes into Maya's eyes.

== Cast ==
- Irrfan Khan as Inspector Uday Singh Rathod
- Ilene Hamann as Maya Solomon
- Himanshu Malik as Ali Ahmed Khan
- Suhel Seth as Harsh Bhatt
- Shyamoli Varma as Shyamoli
- Manish Makhija as Munna
- Denzil Smith as Deputy Commissioner Kumar

== Soundtrack ==
Rog

Soundtrack album by M. M. Keeravani
- Released: March 15, 2004
- Genre: Feature film soundtrack
- Length: 42:00
- Label: Saregama
- Producer: M. M. Keeravani

M. M. Keeravani chronology
Letha Manasulu (2004)	Rog (2004)	Jagapati (2005)

=== Track list ===
The film's soundtrack was composed by M. M. Keeravani, with lyrics penned by Neelesh Mishra and Sayeed Quadri. M. M. Kreem reused the tune of "Vellipothe Ila" from his Telugu movie Okariki Okaru for "Guzar Naa Jaaye". Songs "Maine Dil Se Kaha" and "Khoobsoorat" became extremely popular.

Hindi
No.	Title	Lyrics	Singer(s)	Length
1.	"Khoobsurat, Pt. 1"	Neelesh Misra	Udit Narayan	5:25
2.	"Rog (Theme)"	Instrumental	J. D., Kurt & Samrat	4:31
3.	"Guzar Na Jaaye (Duet)"	Neelesh Misra	K.K. & Shreya Ghoshal	5:33
4.	"Maine Dil Se Kaha"	Neelesh Misra	K.K.	5:12
5.	"Tere Is Jahan Mein"	Sayeed Quadri	K.K.	5:21
6.	"Sufani"		Gaudi	5:35
7.	"Khoobsurat, Pt. 2"	Neelesh Misra	M. M. Keeravani	5:26
8.	"Guzar Na Jaye (Female Vocals)"	Neelesh Misra	Shreya Ghoshal	4:45
Total length:				42:00

== Critical reception ==
Harish Kotian of Rediff.com wrote, ″I would recommend the film. And you are bound to be impressed by Irrfan Khan.″
