= Shilpi Sharma (DJ) =

Indian actress, model and DJ

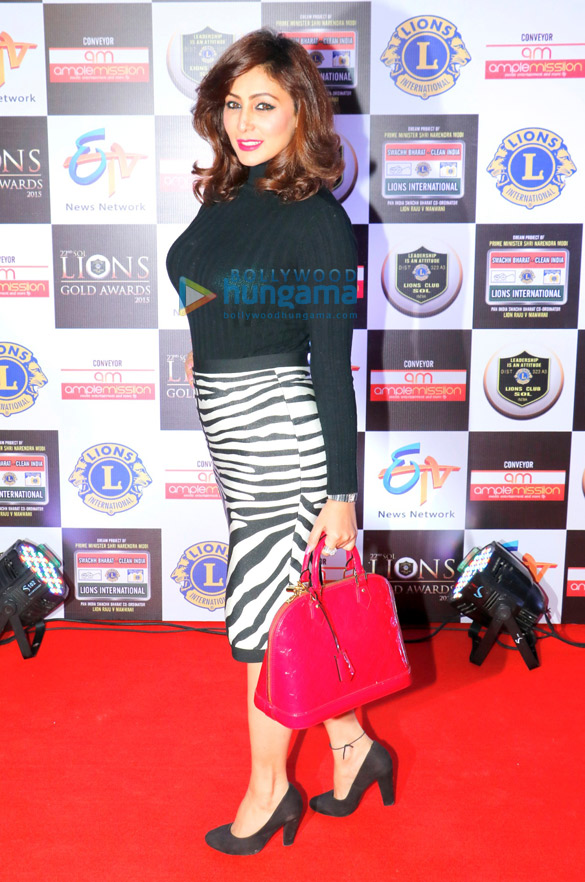
- Born: Dholpur, Rajasthan, India
- Occupations: Actress, Model, DJ
- Years active: 2001–present

Shilpi Sharma, occasionally credited as Shilpi Mudgal, is an Indian actress, model and a DJ.

== Early life and education ==
Sharma originates from a city called Dholpur in the state of Rajasthan, near the city of Agra. She hails from The Jagan Family, one of the most well-known and powerful political and entrepreneurial families in the Indian state of Rajasthan. Her late father, Murari Lal Sharma, served as Nagar Palika, Chairman of Dholpur as Pradhan; her mother and brothers are similarly involved in business and governmental departments. Her uncle Banwari Lal Sharma is a Congress candidate and served as an MLA & Minister for over two decades. Her Brother Ritesh Sharma was a Mayor of Dholpur.

She studied in Nainital & Mumbai and has a degree in acting and interior designing from New York, United States.

== As a DJ ==
In 2014, as a DJ, Sharma became famous for remixing the song "Baby Doll" from the movie Ragini MMS 2. She touched new heights when her song "Chittiyaan Kalaiyaan" from the movie Roy was released. She has been remixing most of Shah Rukh Khan's film songs. Shilpi Sharma is on a roll with her three super hit remixes for the film Dilwale. Produced all-time chartbuster remixes of Shahrukh Khan’s films Dilwale, Jab Harry Met Sejal, Happy New Year, Dear Zindagi, and Raees. Her official Dilwale Soundtrack Remix Album was launched by Shah Rukh Khan himself. She is the only female DJ in India to have her own show on 9XM channel – 9XM House of Dance (two seasons 2020 & 2021): the biggest party mashup show in the country.

Sharma is voted as the top-ranking DJs in India consecutively for the last two years by DJanemag.

== TV advertisement ==
Sharma started her career by acting in television advertisements. She was the face of Pears Soap for five years. She did ads for other brands such as HSBC, Larsen & Tubro, Icici, Khaitan Fans, Babool Toothpaste, Nippo Gold Batteries with Rahul Dravid, McDonald's, Park Avenue, and Colgate

== Film career ==
After doing a number of ads, she made her movie debut as a lead actress with director N. Chandra's comedy thriller Style. She was next cast as a lead actress opposite Sunny Deol in Rahul Rawail's Jo Bole So Nihaal. She made a brief appearance in Subhash Ghai's film, Right Yaa Wrong.

In 2012, she has acted in Madhur Bhandarkar's film Heroine, this drama film was written, directed, and co-produced by Madhur Bhandarkar. In the film, Shilpi Sharma's character name was Isha Sharma. Shilpi described her chance in Bhandarkar as "a family friend" who was approached by the director to play a glamorous role. Shilpi is also currently signed for many Bollywood films. Shilpi also did a special appearance in the film Thank You.

== Awards and recognition ==
- DJ Shilpi Sharma received Young Women Achievers Award.
- Felicitated by ex-President Pratibha Patil for her work towards social causes.

== Filmography ==
Year	Film	Role
2001	Style	Rani
2005	Jo Bole So Nihaal	Satinder "Suzanne" Kaur
2010	Right Yaa Wrong	Special Appearance
2011	Thank You	Kammo
2011	Be Careful	Kavita
2012	Heroine	Isha Sharma

== Discography ==
Year	Film/Album	Song	Co-artist(s)	Ref.
2014	Ragini MMS 2	"Baby Doll" (Remix)	Kanika Kapoor, Meet Bros	
2014	Happy New Year	"Lovely" (Remix)	Kanika Kapoor, Miraya Varma, Ravindra Upadhyay, Fateh	
2015	Roy	"Chittiyaan Kalaiyaan"	Kanika Kapoor	
2015	Dilwale	"Gerua" (Remix)	Pritam	
2015	Dilwale	"Manma Emotion Jage" (Remix)	Antara Mitra, Anushka Manchanda, Pritam	
2015	Dilwale	"Tukur Tukur" (Remix)	Pritam	
2016	The Legend of Michael Mishra	"Luv Letter" (Remix)	Meet Bros	
2016	Rustom	"Tere Sang Yaara"	Atif Aslam	
2016	Dear Zindagi	"Ae Zindagi Gale Lagale"	Arijit Singh, Amit Trivedi, Ilaiyaraaja	
2017	Raees	"Zaalima"	Harshdeep Kaur, Arijit Singh	
2017	Jab Harry Met Sejal	"Ghar" (Remix)	Mohit Chauhan, Nikhita Gandhi	
2017	Jab Harry Met Sejal	"Hawayein" (Remix)	Arijit Singh, Pritam	
2017	Jab Harry Met Sejal	"Butterfly" (Remix)	Sunidhi Chauhan, Pritam, Dev Negi, Aaman Trikha, Nooran Sisters	
2017	Salaam-E-Ishq	"Salaam-E-Ishq" (Reprise)	Arko Pravo Mukherjee	
2020	9XM House Of Dance- New Year Special	"Volume 1"	Various	
2020	9XM House Of Dance- New Year Special	"Volume 2"	Various	
2020	9XM House Of Dance- New Year Special	"Volume 3"	Various	
2020	9XM House Of Dance- New Year Special	"Volume 4"	Various	
2020	9XM House Of Dance- New Year Special	"Volume 5"	Various	
2020	9XM House Of Dance- New Year Special	"Volume 6"	Various	
2021	9XM House Of Dance- New Year Special	"Set 1"	Various	
2021	9XM House Of Dance- New Year Special	"Set 2"	Various	
2021	9XM House Of Dance- New Year Special	"Set 3"	Various	
2021	9XM House Of Dance- New Year Special	"Set 4"	Various	
2021	9XM House Of Dance- New Year Special	"Set 5"	Various	
2021	9XM House Of Dance- New Year Special	"Set 6"	Various	
2021	9XM House Of Dance- New Year Special	"Set 7"	Various	
2021	Satrangi Piya	"Satrangi Piya"	Prakriti Kakar, Samarth Swarup	

== See also ==
- List of Indian film actresses
