= Nupur Mehta =

Indian actress (born 1980)

- Born: New Delhi, India
- Occupation: Actress
- Years active: 2004 – present

Nupur Mehta is an Indian actress who appeared on the cover of Sportswear International and acted in the 2005 Hindi movie Jo Bole So Nihaal.

== Career ==
Mehta won the Miss Delhi title at age 17 and modelled in Milan, Italy with Riccardo Gay model management. Mehta has also starred in TV advertisements for Fanta and Pirelli, and been part of a Fiat calendar. She was on the cover of Sportswear International's June 2001 issue. She featured on the cover of one of India's first Mills & Boon books written by Astha Atray, His Monsoon Bride, after being chosen in a model hunt contest. She was a part of the credited cast in the 2005 Hindi movie Jo Bole So Nihaal.

== Filmography ==
Year	Film	Role	Notes
2004	Aabra Ka Daabra	Jadugarni Bijli / Headmistress Rang Birangi 'RB'	
2005	Jo Bole So Nihaal	Liza	

== Allegations of match fixing ==
The Sunday Times carried out a sting operation on a Delhi based bookie based on allegations that the ICC World Cup 2011 semi-final between India and Pakistan was fixed. The Times said that a Hindi film actress was used to lure cricketers to underperform but did not name her. The report included a blurred image resembling Mehta, who denied any role in the sting. She is considering to sue the British Paper.
