= Mallika Sherawat =

Indian actress (born 1976)

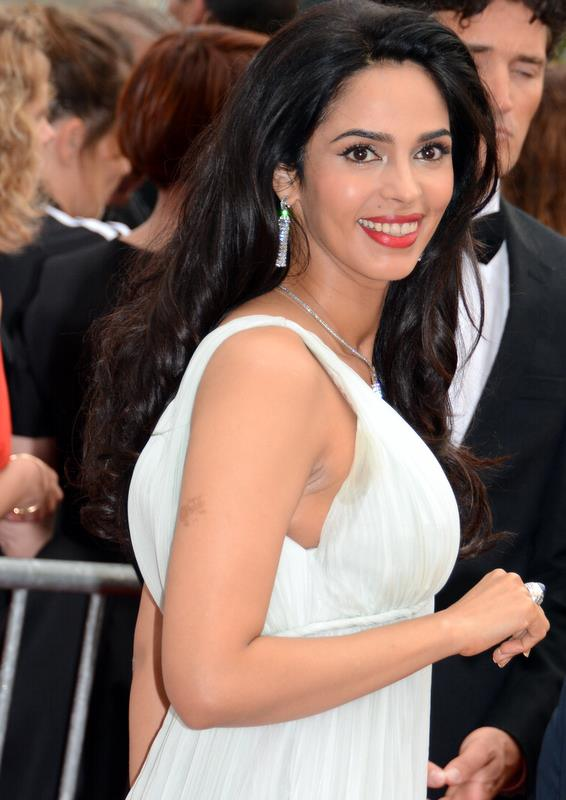
- Sherawat at the 2014 Cannes Film Festival
- Born: Reema Lamba; 24 October 1976 (age 50); Moth, Hisar, Haryana, India
- Occupation: Actress
- Years active: 2002–present
- Spouse: Karan Singh Gill (m. 1997, divorced)

Reema Lamba (born 24 October 1976), better known by the stage name Mallika Sherawat, is an Indian actress who predominantly works in Hindi language films. Known for her bold onscreen portrayal in films like Khwahish (2003) and Murder (2004), Sherawat had established herself as a sex symbol in Bollywood. She is also known for appearing in several popular dance numbers.

Sherawat's role in the romantic comedy Pyaar Ke Side Effects (2006) was well received. She subsequently starred in Aap Ka Suroor, Welcome (both 2007), Dasavathaaram (2008) — her biggest commercial success so far — and Double Dhamaal (2011). Apart from Indian films, she has appeared in the Chinese films The Myth (2005) and Time Raiders (2016). She was one of the few Bollywood stars trying to cross over to Hollywood, with films like Hisss (2010) and Politics of Love (2011).

== Early life ==
Mallika was born as Reema Lamba in Moth, a small village in Hisar district of Haryana to a Jat family. Mallika's father is Mukesh Kumar Lamba and she was born in the family of Seth Chhaju Ram, a leading Jat philanthropist. She adopted the screen name of "Mallika", meaning "empress", to avoid confusion with other actresses named Reema. "Sherawat" is her mother's maiden name. She has stated that she uses her mother's maiden name because of the support that her mother has provided her. Although relations with her family were strained when she entered the film industry, Sherawat's family has now accepted her career choice and they have reconciled.

Sherawat went to Delhi Public School, Mathura Road. She has a degree in philosophy from Miranda House, Delhi University. During the initial days of her career, she claimed to be from a very conservative small-town family and that she faced many hurdles from them in pursuing her career. However, Sherawat's family has rebutted this as a story created by her to give her an aura of a rustic girl who made it big in Bollywood.

== Career ==
Before entering films, Sherawat appeared in television commercials with Amitabh Bachchan for BPL and Shah Rukh Khan for Hyundai Santro. She also appeared in Nirmal Pandey's "Maar Dala" and Surjit Bindrakhia's "Lak Tunoo" music video. She debuted in films with a small rôle in Jeena Sirf Merre Liye where she was credited as Reema Lamba.

Sherawat attracted notice with her appearance in the 2003 film, Khwahish. In 2004, she starred in Murder, a film inspired by Hollywood's Unfaithful. She was noticed for her bold role with critic Narbir Gosal writing, "she has the chops to pull off a role like this one. She´s confident and sexy as Simran and handles her emotional scenes with dignity." She received a nomination for 'Best Actress' at the Zee Cine Awards for her performance in Murder. The film went on to become one of the biggest hits of the year.

Since then, Sherawat has been known for expressing her opinions in public, as well for the reaction to some of her statements.

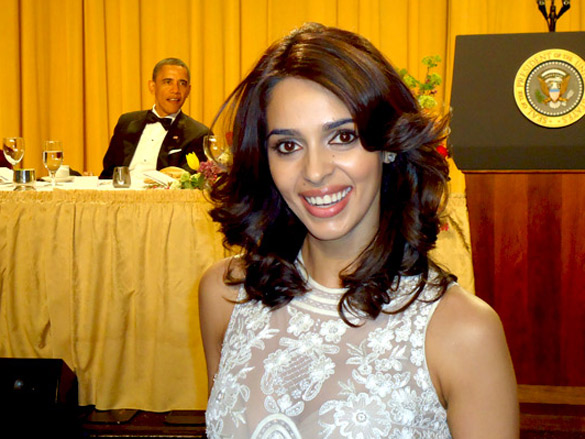
Sherawat at White House Correspondents Dinner

In 2005, Sherawat acted in The Myth, a Chinese film, co-starring with Jackie Chan. She played an Indian girl who saves Chan's character from a river. The Myth was her first international film. Her appearance at the Cannes Film Festival to promote the film secured a lot of attention, with Time magazine's Richard Corliss calling her "the next big thing."

Her performance in the 2006 film Pyaar Ke Side Effects, co-starring Rahul Bose, won her praise from around the industry, with critic Raja Sen commenting, "Mallika steals the show with her disarming candour." and the film did moderately well at the box office.

Her first release in 2007 was Mani Ratnam's Guru, in which she performed the song "Mayya Mayya." She played a guest role in Himesh Reshammiya's Aap Ka Suroor - The Real Love Story and reportedly charged Rs. 15 million for a 10-minute appearance. Her last release of 2007 was Welcome, which did exceptionally well at the box office. Her performance received very favourable reviews with noted film critic Taran Adarsh writing, "Mallika Sherawat is electrifying."

Her 2008 releases were Ugly Aur Pagli and Maan Gaye Mughal-e-Azam. Both were unsuccessful at the box office. Sherawat's next Bollywood release was Double Dhamaal, which went on to becoming a moderate success at the box office, receiving 'above average' status at the box office, by Box Office India. She also appeared in item numbers in films such as Thank You (Razia Gundon Mein Phas Gayi), Bin Bulaye Baraati (Shalu Ke Thumkey) and in Osthe (Kalasala), which is a Tamil film. In 2012, she was featured in an item number in Tezz (Laila). Sherawat has also performed in Kismat Love Paisa Dilli, in which she will be playing a Haryanvi.

On 23 October 2013, Mallika starred in a reality dating show called Bachelorette India - Mere Khayalon ki Mallika. It was adapted from The Bachelorette to find the perfect bachelor for her.

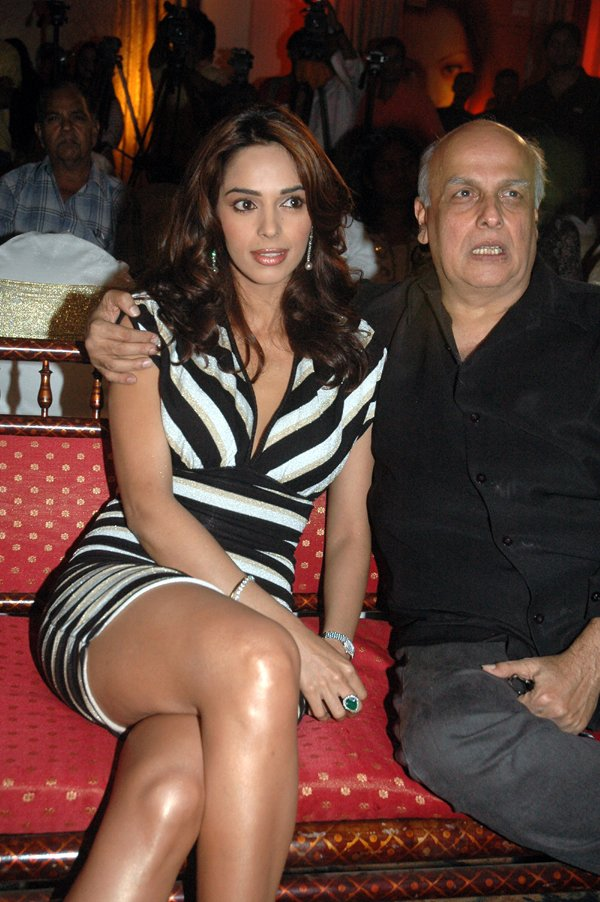
Mallika Sherawat with Mahesh Bhatt, 2007

In 2009, Sherawat starred in a Hollywood film named Hisss, co-starring Irrfan Khan and directed by Jennifer Lynch. The story, based on the legend of Nāga, is an independent co-production between the United States and India. Endeavour Independent bought the distribution rights of Hisss. Sherawat promoted it with live snakes at the Cannes Film Festival 2010. Hisss was released in all major Indian languages on 22 October 2010.

Sherawat starred in another Hollywood film, Politics of Love, directed by William Dear. She played Aretha Gupta, a devoted local Obama volunteer coordinator. The film is a romantic comedy set during Barack Obama's campaign for the US presidency. A first look of Politics of Love was unveiled by Sherawat at Cannes 2010. It was released in 2011.

Sherawat won the 2008 Renaissance Artist Award at the 16th Annual Diversity Awards held in California. On 14 August 2009, Sherawat received honorary citizenship of Los Angeles in recognition of her career achievements and charitable work.

In 2012, Sherawat featured with American pop star Bruno Mars in his parody video of Salt-n-Pepa's "Whatta Man" for the comedy website Funny or Die.

In 2014, she appeared as an Afghan woman on the American series Hawaii Five-0.

She participated in the second season of the reality show, The Traitors India in 2026.

== Personal life ==
During her brief stint as an air hostess, Sherawat married Delhi-based pilot Karan Singh Gill in 1997. She later divorced him. She kept her marriage a secret as the stigma of divorce would have prevented her rise in Bollywood. She dated French real estate agent Cyrille Auxenfans in 2017.

Sherawat is a vegan.

== Activism ==
Sherawat has been involved with women's rights activism, discussing women's issues at the 65th United Nations DPI/NGO Conference in 2014. During the 2018 Cannes Film Festival, Sherawat had herself locked in a cage for twelve hours to support the Free A Girl India NGO.

== Filmography ==
=== Film ===
Year	Film	Role	Notes	Ref.
2002	Jeena Sirf Merre Liye	Seema	Special appearance; credited as Reema Lamba	
2003	Khwahish	Lekha Khorzuvekar		
2004	Kis Kis Ki Kismat	Meena Madhok		
2004	Murder	Simran Saigal		
2005	Bachke Rehna Re Baba	Padmini a.k.a. Paddu/Alka/Meera		
2005	The Myth	Samantha	Chinese film	
2006	Shaadi Se Pehle	Sania		
2006	Darna Zaroori Hai	Riya		
2006	Pyaar Ke Side Effects	Trisha Mallik		
2007	Guru	Champa	Special appearance in Mayya Mayya song	
2007	Aap Ka Suroor - The Real Love Story	Ruby James		
2007	Ee Preethi Yeke Bhoomi Melide		Special appearance; Kannada film	
2007	Welcome	Ishika		
2008	Dasavathaaram	Jasmine	Tamil film	
2008	Ugly Aur Pagli	Kuhumini		
2008	Maan Gaye Mughal-e-Azam	Shabnam		
2010	Hisss	Naagin	English, Hindi crossover film	
2011	Thank You	Razia	Special appearance in item number	
2011	Bin Bulaye Baraati	Shalu	Special appearance in item number	
2011	Double Dhamaal	Kamini Nayak		
2011	Politics of Love	Aretha Gupta	English film	
2011	Osthe	Mallika	Special appearance; Tamil film	
2012	Tezz	Laila	Special appearance	
2012	Kismat Love Paisa Dilli	Lovina		
2015	Dirty Politics	Anokhi Devi		
2016	Time Raiders	Snake Empress	Chinese film	
2017	Zeenat	Ananta		
2022	RK/RKay	Gulabo/Neha		
2024	Pambattam	Mangamma Devi	Tamil film	
2024	Vicky Vidya Ka Woh Wala Video	Chanda Rani		

=== Television ===
Year	Television	Role	Notes
2005	Sarabhai vs Sarabhai	Sunehri	Guest; episode: "Sarabhais and Sunehri"
2013	The Bachelorette India	Herself	
2014	Hawaii Five-0	Farah Khan	Episode: "Makani ʻolu a holo malie" ("Fair Winds and Following Seas")
2018	The Story	Herself	
2019	Booo Sabki Phategi	Hassena	Web series
2021	Nakaab	Zohra Mehra	Series
2026	The Traitors India	Contestant	Reality show on Amazon Prime Video

=== Music videos ===
List of music video credits
Year	Title	Singer(s)	Role	Ref.
2012	"Bruno Mars' Whatta Man"	Salt-N-Pepa	Girl with gun (heroine)	

== Awards and nominations ==
List of Acting Awards And Nominations
Year	Film	Award	Category	Result
2004	Murder	Zee Cine Award	Best Actor – Female	Nominated
2005	Murder	Stardust Award	Superstar of Tomorrow – Female	Nominated
2007	Pyaar Ke Side Effects	Stardust Award	Star of the Year – Female	Nominated
2009	Maan Gaye Mughal-e-Azam	Screen Award	Screen Award for Best Comedian	Nominated
2011	Hisss	Gotham Screen Film Festival & Screenplay Contest	Best Actress	Won
2015	Dirty Politics	Indian Film Festival of Melbourne	Best Actress	Nominated
2016	Dirty Politics	Screen Award	Best Actress (Popular Choice)	Nominated

== See also ==
- List of Hindi film actresses
