= List of songs recorded by Shaan =

Shaan performing at an IBM event IMPRINT 2008

This is a discography of Indian vocalist Shaan. He sings in many Indian languages including Hindi, Bengali, Marathi, Urdu, Tamil, Telugu, Kannada, Bhojpuri and many others. The list includes the popular songs sung by him in various films, especially in Hindi films.

== Hindi film songs ==
=== 1999 ===
Film	Song(s)	Composer(s)	Writer(s)	Co-singer(s)	Ref.
Pyaar Mein Kabhi Kabhi	"Musu Musu Haasi Deu"	Vishal–Shekhar	Raj Kaushal; Vishal Dadlani	Solo	
Pyaar Mein Kabhi Kabhi	"Woh Pehli Baar"	Vishal–Shekhar	Raj Kaushal; Vishal Dadlani	Solo	
Dillagi	"Dillagi Dillagi"	Shankar–Ehsaan–Loy	Javed Akhtar	Kavita Krishnamurthy, Alka Yagnik, Abhijeet, Udit Narayan, Sonu Nigam, Sukhwinder Singh, Shankar Mahadevan, Jaspinder Narula & Mahalaxmi Iyer	

=== 2000 ===
Film	Song(s)	Composer(s)	Writer(s)	Co-singer(s)	Ref.
Raju Chacha	"Raju Chacha"	Jatin–Lalit	Anand Bakshi	Francis Menezes, Shweta Pandit, Shradha Pandit, Sneha Pant	
Raju Chacha	"Tune Mujhe Pehchaana Nahin"	Jatin–Lalit	Anand Bakshi		
Ghaath	"Jo Dar Gaya Woh Mar Gaya"	Anu Malik	Sameer	KK; Anu Malik	
Tarkieb	"Dil Mere Tarse"	Aadesh Shrivastava	Nida Fazli	Sagarika	

=== 2001 ===
Film	Song(s)	Composer(s)	Writer(s)	Co-singer(s)	Ref.
Aamdani Atthanni Kharcha Rupaiya	"Aamdani Atthanni"	Himesh Reshammiya	Sudhakar Sharma	Udit Narayan, Johnny Lever	
Aamdani Atthanni Kharcha Rupaiya	"Ayee Hai Diwali"	Himesh Reshammiya	Sudhakar Sharma	Udit Narayan, Alka Yagnik, Kumar Sanu, Ketki Dave, Sneha Pant	
Aamdani Atthanni Kharcha Rupaiya	"Ta Thaiya Ta Thaiya"	Himesh Reshammiya	Sudhakar Sharma	Sunidhi Chauhan, Preeti Pinky	
Asoka	"O Re Kanchi"	Anu Malik	Gulzar	Suneeta Rao, Alka Yagnik	
Bas Itna Sa Khwaab Hai	"Dil Nasheen"	Aadesh Shrivastav		Sukhwinder Singh, Hema Sardesai	
Bas Itna Sa Khwaab Hai	"Kuch Aisa Jahin"	Aadesh Shrivastav		Alka Yagnik	
Bas Itna Sa Khwaab Hai	"Yeh Hawein"	Aadesh Shrivastav		Alka Yagnik	
Bas Itna Sa Khwaab Hai	"Kya Hua"	Aadesh Shrivastav		Alka Yagnik	
Daman	"Bahar Hi Bahar"	Bhupen Hazarika	Maya Govind	Dominique Cerejo	
Deewaanapan	"Doston Naam Karna Hai"	Aadesh Shrivastava	Sameer	KK, Hema Sardesai, Shraddha Pandit	
Deewaanapan	"Haan Mera Deewanapan"	Aadesh Shrivastava	Sameer	Sunidhi Chauhan	
Deewaanapan	"Hum Deewane"	Aadesh Shrivastava	Sameer	KK, Hema Sardesai	
Deewaanapan	"Main Ik Deewana Ladka"	Aadesh Shrivastava	Sameer	Solo	
Dil Chahta Hai	"Koi Kahe Kehta Rahe"	Shankar–Ehsaan–Loy	Javed Akhtar	Shankar Mahadevan, KK	
Dil Chahta Hai	"Woh Ladki Hai Kahan"	Shankar–Ehsaan–Loy	Javed Akhtar	Kavita Krishnamurthy	
Indian	"Deewane"	Anand Raj Anand	Anand Bakshi	Alka Yagnik	
Lagaan	"Ghanan Ghanan"	A. R. Rahman	Javed Akhtar	Udit Narayan, Alka Yagnik, Sukhwinder Singh, Shankar Mahadevan	
Moksha	"Seep Mein Moti"	Rajesh Roshan	Javed Akhtar		
Officer	"Don't Break My Heart"	Deepak Chowdhary		Jaspinder Narula	
One 2 Ka 4	"Allay Allay"	A. R. Rahman	Majrooh Sultanpuri	Sukhwinder Singh, Srinivas	
Pyaar Ishq Aur Mohabbat	"Apni Yaadon Ko"	Viju Shah	Anand Bakshi	Solo	
Pyaar Zindagi Hai	"Abhi Abhi"			Solo	
Rehnaa Hai Terre Dil Mein	"Bolo Bolo"	Harris Jayaraj	Sameer	Solo	
Rehnaa Hai Terre Dil Mein	"Tujhe Dekha Jabse Jaana Deewana"	Anand Raj Anand	Sameer	Sunidhi Chauhan	
Yeh Raaste Hain Pyaar Ke	"Yeh Raaste Hain Pyaar Ke"	Sanjeev Darshan	Anand Bakshi	Jaspinder Narula	
Yeh Teraa Ghar Yeh Meraa Ghar	"Mil Jaye Khazana"	Anand–Milind	Ibrahim Ashq	KK	

=== 2002 ===
Film	Song(s)	Composer(s)	Writer(s)	Co-singer(s)
16 December	"I Am A Cool Cat"	Karthik Raja		Subhiksha
16 December	"Main Cheez Badi"	Karthik Raja		
Ab Ke Baras	"Main Pyaar Mein Hoon"	Anu Malik	Sameer	Anuradha Paudwal
Ansh: The Deadly Part	"Mumbai Mein"	Nadeem–Shravan	Sameer	KK
Awara Paagal Deewana	"Awara Paagal Deewana"	Anu Malik	Sameer	Sunidhi Chauhan
Awara Paagal Deewana	"Jise Hasna Rona"	Anu Malik	Sameer	Udit Narayan, Sonu Nigam, Alka Yagnik, Sunidhi Chauhan, Sarika Kapoor
Awara Paagal Deewana	"More Sawariya"	Anu Malik	Sameer	Sunidhi Chauhan, Anu Malik
Awara Paagal Deewana	"Ya Habibi"	Anu Malik	Sameer	Adnan Sami, Shabbir Kumar
Badhaai Ho Badhaai	"Raag Banke Pyaar Chhaye"			
Chhal	"Chup Chap"			
Choron Ka Chor (Dubbed)	"Heron Ka Hero"	Mani Sharma		
Choron Ka Chor (Dubbed)	"Hey Mama Mama"	Mani Sharma		Jaspinder Narula
Dil Hai Tumhaara	"Chayya Hai Jo Dil"	Nadeem–Shravan	Sameer Anjaan	Kavita Krishnamurthy
Dil Vil Pyar Vyar	"Mere Samnewali Khidki Mein"	Babloo Chakravorthy		
Humraaz	"Pyaar Kar"	Himesh Reshammiya		
Kaante	"Rama Re"	Anand Raj Anand	Dev Kohli	Zubeen Garg, Sanjay Dutt
Kaante	"Socha Nahin Tha"	Anand Raj Anand		
Kehta Hai Dil Baar Baar	"Aasman Se Chand Laoon"			
Koi Mere Dil Se Pooche	"Tu Mat Ho Udhas"	Rajesh Roshan		Pamela Jain
Kranti	"Mera Dil Tu Wapas Mod De"	Jatin–Lalit	Anand Bakshi	
Kuch Tum Kaho Kuch Hum Kahein	"Choori Choori"	Anu Malik	Sameer	
Kuch Tum Kaho Kuch Hum Kahein	"Tuhi Hai"	Anu Malik	Sameer	
Kyaa Dil Ne Kahaa	"Nikamma Kiya Is Dil Ne (Version 1)"	Himesh Reshammiya	Sanjay Chhel	Kavita Krishnamurthy
Kyaa Dil Ne Kahaa	"Nikamma Kiya Is Dil Ne (Version 2)"	Himesh Reshammiya	Sanjay Chhel	Sanjivani Bhelande, Jaspinder Narula
Kyaa Dil Ne Kahaa	"Taaza Taaza"	Himesh Reshammiya	Sanjay Chhel	Alka Yagnik
Kyaa Dil Ne Kahaa	"Zindagi, Yeh Dillagi"	Himesh Reshammiya	Sanjay Chhel	
Mitr, My Friend	"Pyaar Chahiye"	Bhavatharini Ilayaraja		
Mohabbat Ho Gayi Hai Tumse	"O Saathiya"	Sanjeev-Darshan		
Om Jai Jagadish	"Love Story"	Anu Malik	Sameer	Abhijeet Bhattacharya, Kavita Krishnamurthy
Om Jai Jagadish	"Shaadi"	Anu Malik	Sameer	Hema Sardesai
Pratha	"Yeh Zameen"			
Rishtey	"Har Taraf Tu Hi"	Sanjeev–Darshan	Abbas Katka	Mahalakshmi Iyer
Saathiya	"O Humdum Suniyo Re"	A. R. Rahman	Gulzar	K.K, Kunal Ganjawala
Yeh Dil Aashiqanaa	"Yeh Dil Aashqana"	Nadeem–Shravan	Sameer Anjaan	Jividha Sharma
Yeh Hai Jalwa	"Carbon Copy"			
Yeh Kaisi Mohabbat	"Pyar Hai Tumse"			K. S. Chitra
Yeh Kya Ho Raha Hai?	"Yaar Apne Ghar Jao"	Shankar–Ehsaan–Loy	Javed Akhtar	Kunal Ganjawala, Shankar Mahadevan
Yeh Kya Ho Raha Hai?	"Yeh Sama"	Shankar–Ehsaan–Loy	Javed Akhtar	Sowmya Raoh
Yeh Mohabbat Hai	"Chill Pill"	Anand Raj Anand	Dev Kohli	Harry Anand, Sunidhi Chauhan

=== 2003 ===
Song(s)	No	Composer(s)	Writer(s)	Co-singer(s)
30 Days	Ishq Bada Besharam Hai	Krishnendu Das	Sahil Sultanpuri	
Aapko Pehle Bhi Kahin Dekha Hai	"Aapki Yaad Aaye To (Sad)"	Nikhil–Vinay		Anuradha Paudwal
Andaaz	"Shala La Baby"	Nadeem–Shravan		
Armaan	"Main Gaoon Tum Gao"	Shankar–Ehsaan–Loy		
Baaz: A Bird in Danger	"Chehre Pe"	Ismail Darbar		
Bas Yun Hi	"Kaise Kahoon"	Rajeev-Merlin		
Boys (Dubbed)	"Ale Ale"	A. R. Rahman	Abbas Tyrewala	Madhushree
Calcutta Mail	"Bheegi Bheegi Hawa Hai"	Anand Raj Anand		
Chura Liyaa Hai Tumne	"Boys Are Best"	Himesh Reshammiya	Sameer	
Chura Liyaa Hai Tumne	"Chura Liyaa Hai Tumne"	Himesh Reshammiya	Sameer	
Chura Liyaa Hai Tumne	"Don't You Love Me"	Himesh Reshammiya	Sameer	
Chura Liyaa Hai Tumne	"Mohabbat Hai Mirchi"	Himesh Reshammiya	Sameer	
Chura Liyaa Hai Tumne	"Mohabbat Hai Mirchi (Spicy Mix)"	Himesh Reshammiya	Sameer	
Dhund	"Aas Paas"	Viju Shah		
Fun2shh... Dudes in the 10th Century	"Hold"	Pritam		KK, Sunidhi Chauhan
Haasil	"Aankhon Mein Tumhari"	Jatin-Lalit		
Haasil	"Kisi Ne Mera"	Jatin-Lalit		
Hungama	"Chain Aap Ko"	Nadeem-Shravan	Sameer	
Hungama	"Hungama"	Nadeem-Shravan	Sameer	
Inteha	"Yun Hi Dil Ko Agar"	Anu Malik		
Jhankaar Beats	"Suno Na"	Vishal–Shekhar	Vishal Dadlani	
Jhankaar Beats	"Tera Muskurana"	Vishal–Shekhar	Vishal Dadlani	
Jism	"Jaadu Hai Nasha Hai" (Duet version)	M. M. Keeravani	Neelesh Mishra	Shreya Ghoshal
Jodi Kya Banayi Wah Wah Ramji	"Wah Wah Ramji"	Anand Raj Anand		
Kaise Kahoon Ke... Pyaar Hai	"Le Gayi"	Viju Shah		
Kal Ho Naa Ho	"It's The Time To Disco"	Shankar-Ehsan-Loy	Javed Akhtar	
Kal Ho Naa Ho	"Kuch To Hua Hai"	Shankar-Ehsan-Loy	Javed Akhtar	
Khel – No Ordinary Game	"Chori Chori"			
Khel – No Ordinary Game	"Kiya Hai Jadoo"			
Khushi	"Tere Bina Tere Bina"	Anu Malik	Sameer	Alka Yagnik
Koi... Mil Gaya	"En Panchhiyon"	Rajesh Roshan	Dev Kohli	Kavita Krishnamurthy, Baby Sneha
Kucch To Hai	"Yeh Mera Dil"	Anu Malik	Sameer	Sunidhi Chauhan
Kuch Naa Kaho	"Kuch Naa Kaho"	Shankar-Ehsaan-Loy	Javed Akhtar	
Main Prem Ki Diwani Hoon	"Aur Mohabbat Hai"	Anu Malik	Dev Kohli	
Main Prem Ki Diwani Hoon	"Kasam Ki Kasam"	Anu Malik	Dev Kohli	K. S. Chithra
Main Prem Ki Diwani Hoon	"Prem Prem Prem"	Anu Malik	Dev Kohli	K. S. Chithra, K. K
Miss India - The Mystery	"Neendein"	Anand–Milind		Sunidhi Chauhan
Mumbai Matinee	"You"	Anand Raj Anand		
Munna Bhai M.B.B.S.	"Subha Ho Gayi Mamu"	Anu Malik		
Nayee Padosan	"Dil Mein Dhadkan"	Shankar–Ehsaan–Loy	Sameer	Balram, Shankar Mahadevan
Nayee Padosan	"Rang De Rang De"	Shankar–Ehsaan–Loy	Sameer	Babul Supriyo, Mahalakshmi Iyer
Nayee Padosan	"Sari Sari Raina"	Shankar–Ehsaan–Loy	Sameer	Shweta Pandit
Om - The Ultimate Power	"Deewani Si Ek Ladki"			
Oops!	"Yahein"			
Out of Control	"USA Wich LA"	Anand Raj Anand	Dev Kohli	Sunidhi Chauhan
Qayamat: City Under Threat	"Mera Dil Dil Tu Lele"			Mahalakshmi Iyer
Satta	"Jab Dil Mile"			
Sssshhh...	"Mohabbat Mein Ye"	Anu Malik		
Stumped	"Aise Hi Bada Hua Gavaskar"	Pritam		
Talaash	"Tune Kaha Jab Se Haan"	Sanjeev-Darshan	Sameer	Alka Yagnik
Tehzeeb	"Khoyee Khoyee Aankhen"	A. R. Rahman		
Tere Naam	"O Jaana"	Himesh Reshammiya	Sameer	Alka Yagnik, Udit Narayan, KK
Tujhe Meri Kasam	"Azaadi Hai Pyari"	Viju Shah	Mehboob	Shreya Ghoshal
Valentine Days	"Lukin' for Love"	Jayanta Pathak		Mehnaaz
Valentine Days	"We'll Make it"	Jayanta Pathak		Mehnaaz
Valentine Days	"Valentine Days"	Jayanta Pathak		
Xcuse Me	"Ishq Hua"	Sanjeev-Darshan		Shreya Ghoshal
Xcuse Me	"Ladki Ladki"	Sanjeev-Darshan		Abhijeet
Zameen	"Mere Naal"	Himesh Reshammiya		
Zameen	"Sarzameen Se (Title Song)"	Himesh Reshammiya		

=== 2004 ===
Film	Song(s)	Composer(s)	Writer(s)	Co-singer(s)
Aabra Ka Daabra	"Shiv Om"			
Ab... Bas!	"Mohabbat Karake"	Daboo Malik	Sameer	
Alibaba Aur 40 Chor	"Aiy Aiy Ya"	Anand–Milind		Sunidhi Chauhan
Alibaba Aur 40 Chor	"Kal Ki Baat Hai"	Anand–Milind		Sunidhi Chauhan
Bardaasht	"Aap Ki Khata"	Himesh Reshammiya	Sameer	Alka Yagnik
Bardaasht	"Janaabe Ali"	Himesh Reshammiya	Sameer	Kunal Ganjawala, Himesh Reshammiya
Bow Barracks Forever	"Jab Maine Dekha Use Standing There"	Neel Dutt		
Charas	"Hum Hain Deewane"			
Dhoom	"Shikdum"	Pritam	Sameer	Shreya Ghoshal
Dil Maange More	"Kubaku Mujhe Tu"	Himesh Reshammiya	Sameer	Jayesh Gandhi
Girlfriend	"Bheegi Bheegi"			
Hulchul	"Hum Dil De"	Vidyasagar	Sameer	Sadhana Sargam
Hulchul	"Ishq Mein Pyar Mein"	Vidyasagar	Sameer	Alka Yagnik
Hum Tum	"Ladki Kyun"	Jatin–Lalit	Prasoon Joshi	Alka Yagnik
Ishq Hai Tumse	"Chaahat Ki Khushboo"	Himesh Reshammiya		
Ishq Hai Tumse	"Humko Chahiye"	Himesh Reshammiya		Sagarika
King of Bollywood	"Gaon Ki Gori"			
Kismat	"Chitti Dudh Kudi"	Anand Raj Anand	Dev Kohli	Gayatri Iyer
Krishna Cottage	"Bindaas"	Anu Malik		
Krishna Cottage	"Uff Yun Maa"	Anu Malik		
Kyun! Ho Gaya Na...	"Main Hoon"	Shankar–Ehsaan–Loy	Javed Akhtar	Sunidhi Chauhan
Lakeer – Forbidden Lines	"Paighaam"	A. R. Rehman		Kavita Krishnamurthy
Lakshya	"Main Aisa Kyun Hoon"			
Masti	"Chori Chori"	Anand Raj Anand		Sneha Pant
Masti	"Chain Khuli Ki Main"	Anand Raj Anand		Udit Narayan, Anand Raj Anand
Mission Mumbai	"Pehla Pehla Pyaar"	Anand–Milind		Mahalakshmi Iyer
Musafir	"Rama Re (The Boys Are Back Mix)"			
Muskaan	"Nami Danam"			
Paisa Vasool	"Yaadon Mein"			
Plan	"Aim Kaim"			
Poochho Mere Dil Se	"Poochho Mere Dil Se"	Tabun		Sunidhi Chauhan
Popcorn Khao! Mast Ho Jao	"Kal Se Koi"	Vishal–Shekhar		
Rakht	"Kya Maine Socha (One Love)"	Shaan	Shaan, Blue	Blue
Rok Sako To Rok Lo	"Jaane Kise"	Jatin–Lalit	Sameer	
Rok Sako To Rok Lo	"Nazron Ka Yaarana"	Jatin–Lalit	Sameer	
Rok Sako To Rok Lo	"Rok Sako To Rok Lo"	Jatin–Lalit	Sameer	
Rudraksh	"Ishq Hai Nasha Nasha"	Vishal–Shekhar		Sunidhi Chauhan
Shaadi Ka Laddoo	"Kuch Toh Ho Raha Hai"	Vishal–Shekhar	Vishal Dadlani	Mahalaxmi Iyer
Shaadi Ka Laddoo	"Biwi Ka Belan"	Vishal–Shekhar	Vishal Dadlani	KK
Silence Please... The Dressing Room	"Khelon Mein Pasha Hai"			
Smile Please	"ABCD"			
Smile Please	"Fir Na Kehna"			
Stop!	"Abhi Nahi Aur Kabhi"	Vishal–Shekhar		
Stop!	"Nachle"	Vishal–Shekhar		
Taarzan: The Wonder Car	"Chura Lo Part-II"			
Tum?: A Dangerous Obsession	"Mera Dil Laile"			
Tumsa Nahin Dekha: A Love Story	"Mujhe Tumse Mohabbat Hai"			
Tumsa Nahin Dekha: A Love Story	"Mujhe Tumse Mohabbat Hai (Remix)"			
Yeh Lamhe Judaai Ke	"Ram Kasam Dilli Sarkae"	Nikhil-Vinay		Alka Yagnik

=== 2005 ===
Film	Song(s)	Composer(s)	Writer(s)	Co-singer(s)
99.9 FM	"Gumsum Haun Kyun"	Shaan	Shaan	Solo
99.9 FM	"Tanha Dil"	Ram Sampath	Shaan	Solo
Aashiq Banaya Aapne	"Dillagi Mein Jo Beet Jaaye"	Himesh Reshammiya	Sameer	Sonu Nigam, Himesh Reshammiya, Jayesh Gandhi, Vasundhara Das
Bad Boys	"Tum Jo Gayee"	Syed Ahmed		
Bad Boys	"Bad Boys"	Syed Ahmed		Sonu Nigam, Sunidhi Chauhan
Bewafaa	"Kehta Hai Kabutar"	Nadeem-Shravan	Sameer	Asha Bhosle
Bewafaa	"Pyaar Ki Rahein"	Nadeem-Shravan	Sameer	
Bhola in Bollywood	"Time Pass"	Altamash		Jolly Mukherjee
Blackmail	"Tune Di Bekarari"	Himesh Reshammiya	Sameer	
Blackmail	"Tune Di Bekrari Part-I"	Himesh Reshammiya	Sameer	
Blackmail	"Tune Di Bekrari Part-II"	Himesh Reshammiya	Sameer	
Blackmail	"Tune Di Bekrari Part-III"	Himesh Reshammiya	Sameer	
Brides Wanted	"Yeh Kya Ho Gaya"	Ranjit Barot	Sameer	
Deewane Huye Paagal	"Aisi Umar Mein"	Anu Malik	Sameer	Kunal Ganjawala, Krishna Beura
Deewane Huye Paagal	"Tu Hai Tu Hai"	Anu Malik	Sameer	Sunidhi Chauhan
Dhamkee: The Extortion	"Koi To Baat Hai Chandni Raat"			
Dil Jo Bhi Kahey...	"Dil Jo Bhi Kahe"	Shankar–Ehsaan–Loy		Dominique Cerejo
Dreams	"Sapne Sach Honge			
Dus	"Chham Se"	Vishal–Shekhar	Panchhi Jalonvi	Sonu Nigam, Babul Supriyo, Sunidhi Chauhan, Sapna Mukherjee
Dus	"Dus Bahaane"	Vishal–Shekhar	Panchhi Jalonvi	KK
Ek Khiladi Ek Haseena	"Yaaron Part-I"	Pritam	Mayur Puri	Sonu Nigam
Ek Khiladi Ek Haseena	"Yaaron Part-II"	Pritam	Mayur Puri	Sonu Nigam
Hanuman	"Mahabali Maharudra"			
Home Delivery	"Kaash"	Vishal–Shekhar		
Hum Dum	"Lahaul Vila"			
Hum Dum	"Sitaron Pe"			
Insan	"Rain Rain"	Himesh Reshammiya	Sameer	Sunidhi Chauhan
Jackpot - A Money Game	"Rome Rome"	Dj Phukan		Shashwati
Jalwa - Fun In Love	"Masti Mein Doobi"			
Koi Aap Sa	"Aadat Ho Chutki"	Himesh Reshammiya	Sameer	Sunidhi Chauhan
Koi Aap Sa	"Aadat Ho Chutki (Remix)"	Himesh Reshammiya	Sameer	Sunidhi Chauhan
Koi Mere Dil Mein Hai	"Shararati Shararati"	Nikhil–Vinay		
Kyaa Kool Hai Hum	"We Are So Differetnt"	Anu Malik	Sameer	Kunal Ganjawala, Sunidhi Chauhan
Kyon Ki	"Jhatka Maare"	Himesh Reshammiya	Sameer	Udit Narayan, Kailash Kher
Main Aisa Hi Hoon	"Just Walk Into My Life"	Himesh Reshammiya	Sameer	
Maine Pyaar Kyun Kiya	"Dil Di Nazar"	Himesh Reshammiya	Sameer	
Maine Pyaar Kyun Kiya	"Dil Di Nazar (Remix)"	Himesh Reshammiya	Sameer	
Maine Pyaar Kyun Kiya	"Teri Meri Love Story"	Himesh Reshammiya	Sameer	
Mashooka	"Pyar Karna"	Sajid–Wajid	Sameer	Sunidhi Chauhan
Meri Jung (D)	"La La La Hi Re"	Devi Sri Prasad		Sunidhi Chauhan
Meri Jung (D)	"Man Mein Tu Tan Mein Tu"	Devi Sri Prasad		Sunidhi Chauhan
Mumbai Xpress	"Aila Re"	Ilaiyaraja		
Mumbai Xpress	"Bander Ki Dug Dugi"	Ilaiyaraja		
Mumbai Xpress	"Pyaar Chahiye"	Ilaiyaraja		
Mumbai Xpress	"Pyaar Chahiye" (2)	Ilaiyaraja		
My Brother…Nikhil	"Le Chale Part-1"			
Nishaan	"Nishaan"	Anup Jalota, Jeet Ganguly		
Padmashree Laloo Prasad Yadav	"Kabhi To Rooth Ja"	Nitin Raikar		
Page 3	"Yahaan Zindagi"	Shamir Tandon		Various
Saathi: The Companion	"Kehta Hai Dil"			
Sab Kuch Hai Kuch Bhi Nahin	"Sab Kuch Hai Kuch Bhi Nahin"	Jatin–Lalit		
Salaam Namaste	"My Dil Goes Mmmm"	Vishal–Shekhar		Gayatri Ganjawala
Salaam Namaste	"My Dil Goes Mmmm" (English Club Mix)	Vishal–Shekhar		Gayatri Ganjawala
Shaadi No. 1	"Aiyashi Aiyashi"	Anu Malik		DJ Aqeel, Sanjeev Rathod
Shaadi No. 1	"Dil Nahi Tora Karte"	Anu Malik		Sunidhi Chauhan, Abrar-ul-Haq
Tango Charlie	"Ek Ladki Deewani"			
Time Pass	"Jenny Sad"			
Time Pass	"Woh Kam Nahin Koi"			
Vaada	"Teri Kurti Sexy"	Himesh Reshammiya	Sameer	Anuradha Sriram
Yahaan	"Naam Adaa Likhna"	Shantanu Moitra	Gulzar	Shreya Ghoshal
Yahaan	"Naam Adaa Likhna" (remix)	Shantanu Moitra	Gulzar	Shreya Ghoshal
Yakeen	"Bhoolna Nahin Part-I	Himesh Reshammiya	Sameer	
Yakeen	"Bhoolna Nahin Part-III"	Himesh Reshammiya	Sameer	

=== 2006 ===
Film	Song(s)	Composer(s)	Writer(s)	Co-singer(s)	Ref.
36 China Town	"24x7 I Think Of You"	Himesh Reshammiya	Sameer	Sunidhi Chauhan	
36 China Town	"24x7 I Think Of You (Remix)"	Himesh Reshammiya	Sameer	Sunidhi Chauhan	
Aap Ki Khatir	"Keh Do Na"	Himesh Reshammiya	Sameer	Sunidhi Chauhan	
Alag	"Apun Ki Toli"	Aadesh Shrivastava			
Alag	"Hai Junoon"	Aadesh Shrivastava			
Alag	"Hai Junoon (DJ Suketu Mix)"	Aadesh Shrivastava			
Alag	"Sabse Alag"	Aadesh Shrivastava			
Ankahee	"Ankahee - 1"	Pritam			
Chor Mandli	"Jackpot"				
Chor Mandli	"Meri Zindagi Mein Tum"				
Come December	"Aaj Raat Akele Hai"	Shibani Kashyap, Bappi Lahiri			
Don - The Chase Begins Again	"Main Hoon Don"	Shankar–Ehsaan–Loy	Javed Akhtar		
Don - The Chase Begins Again	"Main Hoon Don (Club Remix)"	Shankar–Ehsaan–Loy	Javed Akhtar		
Eight - The Power of Shani	"Shani 8"				
Fanaa	"Chaand Sifarish"	Jatin–Lalit			
Fanaa	"Chand Sifarish (Club Mix)"	Jatin–Lalit			
Fight Club: Members Only	"Bolo Na Tum Zaraa"	Pritam			
Fight Club: Members Only	"Bolo Na Tum Zaraa (Remix)"	Pritam			
Game	"Chhua Mere Dil Ko"				
Game	"Chuua Mere Dil Ko"				
Golmaal	"Golmaal o o"	Vishal–Shekhar	Kumaar		
Holiday	"Raqs Kar Le"	Ranjit Barot			
Hota Hai Dil Pyaar Mein Paagal	"Laakhon Tere Chahne Wale Hain"	Ali-Vasudev		Javed Ali	
Hota Hai Dil Pyaar Mein Paagal	"Deewanae"	Ali-Vasudev		Javed Ali	
Humko Deewana Kar Gaye	"Mere Saath Chalte Chalte"	Anu Malik	Sameer		
Humko Deewana Kar Gaye	"Mere Saath Chalte Chalte Remix"	Anu Malik	Sameer		
Husn: Love And Betrayal	"Manzil Manzil"				
Jaana - Let's Fall In Love	"Ek Kahani Suni"				
Jaana - Let's Fall In Love	"Let's Fall In Love"				
Jaana - Let's Fall In Love	"Let's Fall In Love (Remix)"				
Jaana - Let's Fall In Love	"Ola Ola"				
Jaana - Let's Fall In Love	"Yes I Love You"				
Jaane Hoga Kya	"Dil Dhak Dhak Karne Laga"				
Kabhi Alvida Naa Kehna	"Where's The Party Tonight"	Shankar–Ehsaan–Loy	Javed Akhtar		
Kabhi Alvida Naa Kehna	"Rock And Roll Soniye"	Shankar–Ehsaan–Loy	Javed Akhtar		
Kudiyon Ka Hai Zamana	"Jaanam"				
Lage Raho Munna Bhai	"Lage Raho Munnabhai (Remix)"	Shantanu Moitra			
Love Ke Chakkar Mein	"Hum The Aasma Pe"	Daboo Malik	Praveen Bhardwaj		
Love Ke Chakkar Mein	"Suno Na Dil Kya Kehta Hai"	Daboo Malik	Praveen Bhardwaj	Alka Yagnik	
Love Ke Chakkar Mein	"Itna Bata Do Hame Kya"	Anand Raj Anand	Praveen Bhardwaj	Sadhana Sargam	
Men Not Allowed	"Madhoshiyon Mein Hain Doobi"				
Mere Jeevan Saathi	"Mashooqa"	Nadeem-Shravan		Alisha Chinai	
Phir Hera Pheri	"Phir Hera Pheri"	Himesh Reshammiya	Sameer	Sonu Nigam, Kunal Ganjawala	
Phir Hera Pheri	"Phir Hera Pheri (Remix)"	Himesh Reshammiya	Sameer	Sonu Nigam, Kunal Ganjawala	
Pyare Mohan	"Har Mohan Ki Koi Radha"	Anu Malik		Udit Narayan, Krishna Beura, Anu Malik, Ranjit Barot, Earl Edgar	
Rehguzar - The Road To Destiny	"Meri Bechainiyaan"				
Saawan... The Love Season	"Mere Dil Ko"	Aadesh Shrivastava			
Saawan... The Love Season	"Punjabi Ankhonwali"	Aadesh Shrivastava			
Saawan... The Love Season	"Saawan"	Aadesh Shrivastava			
Taxi No. 9211	"Bekhudi"	Vishal–Shekhar			
With Luv ... Tumhaara	"Zindagi"				
Yun Hota Toh Kya Hota	"Yadon Mein"	Viju Shah	Sameer	Shreya Ghoshal	

=== 2007 ===
Film	Song(s)	Composer(s)	Writer(s)	Co-singer(s)	Ref.
Apna Asmaan	"Shehzaada"				
Apne	"Ankh Vich Chehra Pyaar Da"	Himesh Reshammiya		Kunal Ganjawala, Amrita Kak, Zubeen Garg	
Apne	"Ankh Vich Chehra Pyaar Da (Remix)"	Himesh Reshammiya		Kunal Ganjawala, Amrita Kak, Zubeen Garg	
Apne	"Bulls Eye"	Himesh Reshammiya		Earl D'souza	
Bheja Fry	"Bacha Hai Na Koi"				
Bhool Bhulaiya	"Let's Rock Soniye"	Pritam Chakraborty	Sameer	Tulsi Kumar	
Bhool Bhulaiya	"Let's Rock Soniye" (remix)	Pritam Chakraborty	Sameer	Tulsi Kumar	
Buddha Mar Gaya	"Buddha Mar Gaya - Title Track"	Bappi Lahiri	Manoj Muntashir	Kunal Ganjawala, Sunidhi Chauhan	
Chhodon Naa Yaar	"Zindagi"	Anand Raj Anand	Anand Raj Anand		
Dahek	"Andheri Raaton Mein (son)"				
Darling	"Aa Khushi Se Khudkushi"	Pritam	Sameer	Sunidhi Chauhan	
Darling	"Aa Khushi Se Khudkushi (Remix)"	Pritam	Sameer	Sunidhi Chauhan	
Darling	"Hasaye Bhi Rulaye Bhi"	Pritam	Sameer	Tulsi Kumar	
Darling	"Hasaye Bhi Rulaye Bhi(Remix)"	Pritam	Sameer	Tulsi Kumar	
Dhamaal	"Chal Nache Shor Machaaye"	Adnan Sami	Sameer	Adnan Sami	
Dhamaal	"Dekho Dekho Dil Ye Bole"	Adnan Sami	Sameer	Adnan Sami	
Dhol	"Bheega Aasman"	Pritam Chakraborty	Irshad Kamil	Vijay Yesudas	
Dhol	"Namakool"	Pritam Chakraborty	Irshad Kamil	Kunal Ganjawala	
Game	"Chhua Mrre Dil Ko" (solo)	Bapi-Tutul	Sandeep Nath		
Game	"Chhua Mere Dil Ko" (duet)	Bapi-Tutul	Sandeep Nath	Shreya Ghoshal	
Heyy Babyy	"Meri Duniya Tu Hi Re"	Shankar–Ehsaan–Loy	Sameer	Sonu Nigam, Shankar Mahadevan	
Honeymoon Travels Pvt. Ltd.	"Jaane Hai Woh Kahan"	Vishal–Shekhar		Shreya Ghoshal	
Icy N Spicy	"Tujhko Chaha"	Dilip Sen			
Jab We Met	"Aao Milo Chale"	Pritam	Irshad Kamil		
Just Married	"Baat Pakki"	Pritam	Gulzar	Neeraj Shridhar	
Just Married	"Baat Pakki (Remix)"	Pritam	Gulzar	Sunidhi Chauhan, Mahalaxmi Iyer, Sukhwinder Singh	
Just Married	"Ram Milaye Jodi"	Pritam	Gulzar	Sukhwinder Singh, Sunidhi Chauhan	
Kaisay Kahein	"Kaisay Kahein"	Pritam	Irshad Kamil		
Kya Love Story Hai	"Miss You Everyday"	Pritam	Sameer		
Kya Love Story Hai	"Miss You Everyday (Remix)"	Pritam	Sameer		
Life Mein Kabhie Kabhiee	"Valha Valha"	Lalit Pandit	Sameer	Sunidhi Chauhan, Mahalaxmi Iyer, Shamit	
Love Guru	"Dekho Na Dekho Na"			Sowmya Raoh	
Love Guru	"Pyaar Ki Hai Taknik"			Vaishali Samant	
Luv and Kush	"Ek Kahani Main Sunaoon"	Kutty			
Manthan - Ek Kashmakash	"Yeh Zameen Roshni Se"				
Marigold	"Listen To the Music"	Shankar–Ehsaan–Loy	Javed Akhtar	Ali Larter, Truth Hurts	
Marigold	"Seven Stages Of Love"	Shankar–Ehsaan–Loy	Javed Akhtar	Truth Hurts	
Marigold	"Yeh Pyaar Hai (That's Love)"	Shankar–Ehsaan–Loy	Javed Akhtar		
Marigold	"Yeh Pyaar Kya Hai (Seven Stages Of Love)"	Shankar–Ehsaan–Loy	Javed Akhtar		
MP3: Mera Pehla Pehla Pyaar	"Dosti"	Ashutosh Phatak, Dhruv Ghanekar		Suhail Kaul	
Mr Hot Mr Kool	"Dekha Tumhe"				
Mr Khujli	"Khujli Hai"				
Mumbai Salsa	"Akeli Zindagi"	Adnan Sami	Sameer		
Mumbai Salsa	"Pyar Se"	Adnan Sami	Sameer	Shreya Ghoshal	
My Friend Ganesha	"Dekho Re Dekho"				
My Friend Ganesha	"Shael Sutha Ke Ankhon"				
Nehlle Pe Dehlla	"Nehlle Pe Dehlla"	Nitin Shankar			
Nehlle Pe Dehlla	"Nehlle Pe Dehlla (Version 2)	Nitin Shankar			
Nehlle Pe Dehlla	"Husn Husn"	Nitin Shankar			
Om Shanti Om	"Deewangi Deewangi"	Vishal–Shekhar	Javed Akhtar		
Om Shanti Om	"Daastaan-E-Om Shanti Om"	Vishal–Shekhar	Javed Akhtar		
Om Shanti Om	"Deewangi Deewangi (Rainbow Mix)"	Vishal–Shekhar	Javed Akhtar		
Om Shanti Om	"Daastaan (The Dark Side Mix)"	Vishal–Shekhar	Javed Akhtar		
Panga Naa Lo	"Dil Ki Kuch Baatein"				
Panga Naa Lo	"Us Paar Hai Meri Jaan"				
Partner	"Do U Wanna Partner"	Sajid–Wajid	Irshad Kamil	Udit Narayan, Wajid, Suzanne D'Mello, Clinton Cerejo	
Partner	"Do U Wanna Partner (Remix)"	Sajid–Wajid	Irshad Kamil	Udit Narayan, Wajid, Suzanne D'Mello, Clinton Cerejo	
Partner	"You're My Love"	Sajid–Wajid	Irshad Kamil	Shweta Pandit, Suzanne D'Mello, Earl D’Souza	
Partner	"You're My Love (Remix)"	Sajid–Wajid	Irshad Kamil	Shweta Pandit, Suzanne D'Mello, Earl D’Souza	
Saawariya	"Jab Se Tere Naina"	Monty Sharma	Sameer		
Sakura	"Jhoom Jhoom"				
Salaam-e-Ishq: A Tribute to Love	"Mera Dil"	Shankar–Ehsaan–Loy	Sameer	Nihira Joshi	
Shakalaka Boom Boom	"Issi Umeed Pe"	Himesh Reshammiya	Sameer		
Shakalaka Boom Boom	"Thaare Vaaste"	Himesh Reshammiya	Sameer		
Shakalaka Boom Boom	"Thaare Vaaste Remix"	Himesh Reshammiya	Sameer		
Shakalaka Boom Boom	"Rukhsat"	Himesh Reshammiya	Sameer		
Shakalaka Boom Boom	"Aaj Nahi To Kal"	Himesh Reshammiya	Sameer		
Showbiz	"Kaash Ek Din Aisa Bhi Aaye"	Lalit Pandit	Sayeed Quadri	Shreya Ghoshal	
Siyasat	"Le Chal Hawa Uski Gali"	Santosh Sharma			
Speed	"Hello"	Pritam	Mayur Puri	Sunidhi Chauhan	
Speed	"Wanna Wanna"	Pritam	Mayur Puri	Sunidhi Chauhan	
Ta Ra Rum Pum	"Ta Ra Rum Pum"	Vishal–Shekhar	Javed Akhtar	Mahalakshmi Iyer, Sneha & Shravan	
Ta Ra Rum Pum	"Hey Shona"	Vishal–Shekhar	Javed Akhtar	Sunidhi Chauhan	
Taare Zameen Par	"Bum Bum Bole"	Shankar–Ehsaan–Loy			
Narnia (Hindi Version)	"Shuruaat"				
The Train	"The Train (An Inspiration)"	Mithoon	Sayeed Quadri		
Victoria No 203	"Deedani"				
Welcome	"Insha Allah"	Himesh Reshammiya	Sameer	Krishna Beura, Akriti Kakkar	
Welcome	"Welcome"	Sajid–Wajid	Shabbir Ahmed	Sowmya Raoh, Wajid	
Yeh Ishq Nahin	"Yeh Baatein Suhani"			Sadhana Sargam, Suresh Wadkar	
Yeh Ishq Nahin	"Nayi Zindagi Hai"				

=== 2008 ===
Film	Song(s)	Composer(s)	Writer(s)	Co-singer(s)
A Wednesday!	"Jalwa"	Sanjay Chowdhury	Irshad Kamil	
A Wednesday!	"Nazar Lage Na"	Sanjay Chowdhury	Irshad Kamil	Mahalakshmi Iyer
A Wednesday!	"Parwazen"	Sanjay Chowdhury	Irshad Kamil	
Anamika	"Aashiqi"	Anu Malik	Sameer	
Anamika	"Shagufta Dil"	Anu Malik	Sameer	
Anamika	"Shadufta Dil (Remix)"	Anu Malik	Sameer	
Bhram	"Jaane Kaisa Hai Tu"	Pritam		
Black Cinderella	"Ijazat Bina"			
Camp Rock	"Hasta La Vista"	Sangeet-Siddharth		Jimmy Felix, Vasudha Sharma
Cheenti Cheenti Bang Bang	"Chham Chham"	Jeet Ganguly	Nida Fazli	
Cheenti Cheenti Bang Bang	"Rim Jhim"	Jeet Ganguly	Nida Fazli	Shreya Ghoshal
Contract	"Badalon Pe"			
Dashavatar	"Raat Suhani Mast Chandani"	Anand Kurhekar		Shreya Ghoshal
Dashavatar (dubbed)	"Oh Sanam Ho Sanam"	Himesh Reshammiya	Sameer	Mahalaxmi Iyer
Dashavatar (dubbed)	"Oh Sanam Ho Sanam (Remix)"	Himesh Reshammiya	Sameer	Mahalaxmi Iyer
De Taali	"De Taali"	Vishal–Shekhar		
De Taali	"De Taali (The Clap Trap Mix)"	Vishal–Shekhar		
De Taali	"Everybody Put Your"	Vishal–Shekhar		
De Taali	"Tooti Phooti"	Vishal–Shekhar		
Deshdrohi	"Tujhe Dekhu Toh"	Nikhil-Vinay	Kamaal Rashid Khan	
Deshdrohi	"Ye Ishq Gunah Hone De"	Nikhil-Vinay	Kamaal Rashid Khan	
Dhara	"Mera Dil Deewana"			
Don Muthu Swami	"Tum Kaun Ho"	Daboo Malik		
Dostana	"Kuch Kum"	Vishal–Shekhar	Vishal Dadlani	
Drona	"Khushi"	Dhruv Ghanekar		Suzanne D'Mello, Francois Castellino, Dean Devlin, Sunaina Gupta
Ek Vivaah Aisa Bhi	"Dono Nibhayein Apna Dharam"	Ravindra Jain	Ravindra Jain	Shryea Ghoshal, Suresh Wadkar
Ek Vivaah Aisa Bhi	"Jhirmir Jhirmir Meha Barse"	Ravindra Jain	Ravindra Jain	Shreya Ghoshal
Ek Vivaah Aisa Bhi	"Jhirmir Jhirmir Meha Barse (Part 2)"	Ravindra Jain	Ravindra Jain	Shreya Ghoshal
Ek Vivaah Aisa Bhi	"Kya Soch Ke Aaye The"	Ravindra Jain	Ravindra Jain	
Ek Vivaah Aisa Bhi	"Lo Ji Hum Aa Gaye"	Ravindra Jain	Ravindra Jain	Pamela Jain, Farid Sabri, Satish Dehra
Ek Vivaah Aisa Bhi	"Mujhme Zinda Hai Woh"	Ravindra Jain	Ravindra Jain	Shreya Ghoshal
Ek Vivaah Aisa Bhi	"Mujhme Zinda Hai Woh (Part 2)"	Ravindra Jain	Ravindra Jain	Shreya Ghoshal
Ek Vivaah Aisa Bhi	"Neend Mein Hai"	Ravindra Jain	Ravindra Jain	
Ek Vivaah Aisa Bhi	"Sang Sang Rahenge Janam Janam"	Ravindra Jain	Ravindra Jain	Shreya Ghoshal, Suresh Wadkar
EMI	"Aaja Aa Bhi Jaa"	Chirantan Bhatt		
Ghatothkach	"Main Yahan Tu Wahan"			
God Tussi Great Ho	"Let's Party"			
God Tussi Great Ho	"Let's Party" (remix)			
Gumnaam – The Mystery	Zaalim Ishq"	Nadeem Shravan	Sameer	Sunidhi Chauhan
Haal-e-Dil	"Khwahish"	Raghav Sachar		Sunidhi Chauhan, Raghav Sachar
Hari Puttar: A Comedy of Terrors	"Hari Puttar"	Aadesh Shrivastava		Aadesh Shrivastava, Neha Bhasin
Hastey Hastey	"Rock The World"	Anu Malik	Sameer	Sunidhi Chauhan
Hastey Hastey	"Rock The World" (Male version)	Anu Malik	Sameer	
Hello	"Mitwa Re"	Sajid–Wajid		Sadhana Sargam, Wajid
Hijack	"Aksar (Sad Version)"			
Hijack	"Aksar (unplugged)"			
Humsey Hai Jahaan	"Baaton Mein"			
Humsey Hai Jahaan	"Tu Andhere Mein"			
Jeena To Hai	"Jeena To Hai Har Haal Mein"			
Jimmy	"Do Minute Mein"			
Jimmy	"Why Not Jimmy"			
Khushboo	"Dil Yeh Kahe"			
Khushboo	"Dil Yeh Kahe (Club Mix)"			
Kismat Konnection	"Move Your Body Now"	Pritam Chakraborty	Irshad Kamil	Akriti Kakar
Kismat Konnection	"Move Your Body Now (Remix) Dj Suketu & Aks"	Pritam Chakraborty	Irshad Kamil	Akriti Kakar
Kool Nahin Hot Hain Hum	"Kool Nahin Hot Hai Hum"			
Love Story 2050	"Jane Kaisi Hai (Happy Version)"	Anu Malik	Javed Akhtar	
Love Story 2050	"Jane Kaisi Hai (Sad Version)"	Anu Malik	Javed Akhtar	
Love Story 2050	"Mausam Achanak Ye Badala Kyu"	Anu Malik	Javed Akhtar	Alka Yagnik
Love Story 2050	"Milo Na Milo"	Anu Malik	Javed Akhtar	
Maan Gaye Mughal-e-Azam	"Pyaar Kiya Toh Darna Kya"			
Meerabai Not Out	"O Dil Sambhal"	Sandesh Shandilya		Sunidhi Chauhan
Meerabai Not Out	"O Dil Sambhal (Remix)"	Sandesh Shandilya		Sunidhi Chauhan
Meeting Se Meeting Tak	"Jab pyar Ho"	Mithoon		Shreya Ghoshal
Mere Baap Pehle Aap	"Jaana Hai Tujhko"	Vidyasagar	Sameer	Alka Yagnik
Mission Istaanbul	"Jo Gumshuda"	Anu Malik	Sameer	Mahalakshmi Iyer, Ege
Money Hai Toh Honey Hai	"Dance Master"	Nitz'n'Sony	Sameer	Shivamani
Mr. Black Mr. White	"Ek Dil Ki"	Jatin–Lalit	Sameer	Udit Narayan, Alka Yagnik
My Name Is Anthony Gonsalves	"Ya Baba"	Pritam	Sameer	Sunidhi Chauhan
My Name Is Anthony Gonsalves	"Ya Baba" (Remix)	Pritam	Sameer	Sunidhi Chauhan
Pehli Nazar Ka Pyaar	"O Soniya"			Pamela Jain, Javed Ali
Pehli Nazar Ka Pyaar	"Bheegi Bheegi Raaton Mein"			Shreya Ghoshal
Pehli Nazar Ka Pyaar	"Mahiya Maine Dil"			Kalpana Patowary
Race	"Dekho Nashe Mein"	Pritam	Sameer	Sunidhi Chauhan, KK
Rafoo Chakkar	"Kal Kisne Dekha"	Lalit Pandit	Salim Bijnori	Vinod Rathod, Mahalaxmi Iyer
Rafoo Chakkar	"Khuda Hafez"	Siddharth-Suhaas	Salim Bijnori	KK
Shrameya - The Laborious	"Yeh Khuli Vadiya"			Alka Yagnik
Sirf	"Ghar Tera Ghar Mera"	Ranjit Barot		
Superstar	"Rafa Dafa"	Shamir Tandon		Kunal Ganjawala, Amrita Kak, Sanjeevani
Thodi Life Thoda Magic	"Maana Ye Aaj Humne"			
Ugly Aur Pagli	"Yeh Nazar Aur Ye"			
Via Darjeeling	"Kahin Nahin (Part 2)"			
Woodstock Villa	"Yeh Pyaar Hai"			Anchal Bhatia

=== 2009 ===
Films	Song	Composer(s)	Writer(s)	Co-singer(s)
3 Idiots	"Aal Izz Well"	Shantanu Moitra		Sonu Nigam, Swanand Kirkire
3 Idiots	"Behti Hawa Sa Tha Woh"	Shantanu Moitra		Shantanu Moitra
3 Nights 4 Days	"Dosti..Forever"			Sunidhi Chauhan
42 Kms.	"Tumse Milke Hua"			Sunidhi Chauhan
99	"Kal Ki Tarah"			Sunidhi Chauhan
Aa Dekhen Zara	"Gazab"	Pritam	Irshad Kamil	Sunidhi Chauhan
Aasma: The Sky Is the Limit	"Aasma"			
Aladin	"Tak Dhina Dhin"	Vishal–Shekhar	Vishal Dadlani	Shankar Mahadevan
Aladin	"Ore Saawariya"	Vishal–Shekhar	Vishal Dadlani	Amitabh Bachchan, Sudesh Bhosle, Shreya Ghoshal
Aladin	"Bachke O Bachke"	Vishal–Shekhar	Anvita Dutt Guptan	Shankar Mahadevan, Sunidhi Chauhan, Vishal Dadlani
Chal Chala Chal	Chanchal Hai Aankhein Tumhaari"			Sadhana Sargam
Chal Chala Chal	"Nacho"	Anu Malik		Anu Malik
Chal Chalein	"Batladein Koi"	Ilaiyaraja	Piyush Mishra	
Chal Chalein	"Shehar Hai Khoob Kya Hai"	Ilaiyaraja	Piyush Mishra	
Chal Chalein	"Uff Are Tu Mirch Hai"	Ilaiyaraja	Piyush Mishra	
Dekh Re Dekh	"Phoolon Se Tu"			
Detective Naani	"Dhadakta Dil"	Jolly Mukherjee	Romilla Mukherjee	Shreya Ghoshal
Do Knot Disturb	"Don't Ever Leave Me"	Nadeem–Shravan		
Ek Second	"Kyon Maang Yeh Khali Hai"			
Ek Aadat	"Kyun Ho Gaya Ye Deewaana"			
Ek Se Bure Do	"Jaana Jaana"			
Fast Forward	"Aankhon Ki Baat"			
Fast Forward	"Tum Jo Mile"			
Jashnn	"Tere Bin"	Sandesh Shandilya	Nilesh Mishra	Shreya Ghoshal
Kal Kissne Dekha	"Kal Kissne Dekha"	Sajid–Wajid	Sameer	Shreya Ghoshal, Bob
Kal Kissne Dekha	Kal Kissne Dekha (Club Mix)	Sajid–Wajid	Sameer	Shreya Ghoshal, Bob
Kal Kissne Dekha	"Aasman Jhuk Gaya"	Sajid–Wajid	Sameer	Shreya Ghoshal
Kambakkht Ishq	"Kyun"	Anu Malik		Shreya Ghoshal
Kisaan	"Humko Rehna Hai"			
Kisse Pyaar Karoon	"Kisse Pyaar Karoon"	Daboo Malik		Daboo Malik
Kisse Pyaar Karoon	"Sanam Sanam"	Daboo Malik		Shreya Ghoshal
Kisse Pyaar Karoon	"Jahan Tak Ye Meri Nazar"	Daboo Malik		Shreya Ghoshal
Life Partner	"Kuke Kuke"	Pritam		Antara Mitra
Life Partner	"Kuke Kuke" (remix)	Pritam		Antara Mitra, Debojeet Dutta
Love Ka Tadka	"Aankhon Ne Chhede Taraane"	Aadesh Shrivastava		Mahalakshmi Iyer
Love Ka Tadka	"Aankhon Ne Chhede Taraane" (sad)	Aadesh Shrivastava		Mahalakshmi Iyer
Love Khichdi	"Yo Baby"	Pritam		
Main Aur Mrs Khanna	Mrs. Khanna"	Sajid–Wajid		Sunidhi Chauhan, Bappi Lahiri, Suzanne D'Mello, Neuman Pinto
Mere Khwabon Mein Jo Aaye	"Sehmi Sehmi"			
Mere Khwabon Mein Jo Aaye	"Patthron Ke Bane In Shahron"			
Meri Padosan	"Sona Sona Roop Hai Mera"	Ravi Meet		
Mohandas	"Nadi Mein Ye Chanda"			
Mohandas	"Janabe Ali" (Remix)			
Morning Walk	"Meethi Meethii Baatein"			
Morning Walk	"Aasman Chhoona Nahin"			
Morning Walk	"Nachle"			
Paa	"Gali Mudhi Ittefaq Se"	Ilaiyaraaja	Swanand Kirkire	
Pazhassi Raja (dubbed)	"Yaar Hai Badle"	Ilaiyaraaja	Manoj Muntashir, Manisha Korde	Kunal Ganjawala
Pazhassi Raja (dubbed)	"Yeh Dharti Bhi"	Ilaiyaraaja	Manoj Muntashir, Manisha Korde	Kunal Ganjawala
Paying Guests	"Jack & Jill"	Sajid-Wajid		
Paying Guests	"Jack & Jill" (Remix)	Sajid-Wajid		
Phir Kabhi	"Phir Kabhi"	Shantanu Moitra	Ajay Jhingaran	
Rockin Meera	"Laila"			
Rockin Meera	"Kabaddi Rap"			
Runway	"Roshan Dil Ka Jahan"			
Suno Na	"Deewana Ab Dil Na Maane"	Sanjay Chowdhury		
Teree Sang	"Lal Quile Ke Peechey"	Anu Malik	Sameer	Anmol Malik
Vaada Raha	"Aaj Aasmaan"			
Victory	"Tu Ne Re"	Anu Malik		
Wanted	"Dil Leke"	Saiid-Wajid	Arun Bhairav	Shreya Ghoshal, Suzanne D'Mello
What's Your Raashee?	"Aaja Lehraate"	Sohail Sen		Bhavya Pandit
World Cupp 2011	"Forever"	Aadesh Shrivastava	Sameer	Vijayta Pandit
World Cupp 2011	"Let's Rock India"	Aadesh Shrivastava	Sameer	
Zor Lagaa Ke... Haiya!	"Ehsaas Bejaan Hai"	Bapi–Tutul	Sandeep Nath, Amitabh Verma	

=== 2010 ===
Film	Song(s)	Composer(s)	Writer(s)	Co-singer(s)
Aakhari Decision	"Zaraa Maara Maara Sa"	Tutul, Bapi & Hanif Sheikh		
Aashayein	"Dilkash Dildaar Duniya"	Pritam	Mir Ali	Tulsi Kumar
Aashayein	"Dilkash Dildaar Duniya (Remix)"	Pritam	Mir Ali	Tulsi Kumar
Apartment	"O Jaane Jaan"	Bappi Lahiri		Sunidhi Chauhan
Apartment	"O Jaane Jaan-1"	Bappi Lahiri		
Bird Idol	"Hey You (Muskurumber)"	Sangeet Haldipur		Neeti Mohan
Bird Idol	"Happy Bird Day"	Sangeet Haldipur		Wrisha Dutta
Bird Idol	"Happy Bird Day" (remix)	Sangeet Haldipur		Wrisha Dutta
Bird Idol	"Oomph Soniye"	Sangeet Haldipur		Wrisha Dutta
Bird Idol	"Oomph Soniye" (remix)	Sangeet Haldipur		Wrisha Dutta
Bumm Bumm Bole	Bumm Bumm Bole	Azaan Sami	Irfan Siddiqui	
Chance Pe Dance	"Rishta Hai Mera"	Adnan Sami	Irfaan Siddiqui	Tulsi Kumar
Chase	"Shaam Ki"			
Click	"Mehroom"	Samir Tandon	Shabbir Ahmed	Shreya Ghoshal
Dunno Y... Na Jaane Kyon	"Dabi Dabi Khwahishein"	Nikhil		Shreya Ghoshal
Dunno Y... Na Jaane Kyon	"Dabi Dabi Khwahishein" (version 2)	Nikhil		Shreya Ghoshal, Farhad Bhiwandiwala
Dunno Y... Na Jaane Kyon	"Dunno Y... Na Jaane Kyon" (male)	Nikhil		
Ek Hi Raasta (D)	"Sameera Ek Baar I Love U"	Mani Sharma	Anwar Sagar	
Golmaal 3	"Apna Har Din"	Pritam	Kumaar	Anushka Manchanda
Hum Tum Aur Ghost	"Banware Se Pooche Banwariya"	Shankar–Ehsaan–Loy	Javed Akthar	Sunidhi Chauhan, Maria Goretti, Loy Mendonsa, Raman Mahadevan, Anusha Mani, Rahul Saxena
Idiot Box	"You Are My Wife"	Anand–Milind	Sameer	
Jaane Kahan Se Aayi Hai	"Jaane Kahan Se Aayi Hai"	Sajid–Wajid	Sameer	
Khichdi: The Movie	"Chal Chal Bhosle Market"	Raju Singh		Mahalaxmi Iyer
Muskurake Dekh Zara	"Muskurake Dekh Zara"			
Pyaar Kaa Fundaa	"Is It Love"			
Sadiyaan	"Jadu Nasha Ehsaas Kya"	Adnan Sami		Shreya Ghoshal
Sadiyaan	"Dekha Tujhay Jo Pehli Baar"	Adnan Sami		
Swaha	"Baby Ba Ba"	Praveen Bhardwaj	Praveen Bhardwaj	
Toonpur Ka Superrhero	"Baliye"	Anu Malik	Mumzy	Hard Kaur
Trump Card	"Life Is Fun"	Lalit Sen		Sunidhi Chauhan
Trump Card	"Raat Ka Jaadu"	Lalit Sen		Sunidhi Chauhan
Tum Milo Toh Sahi	"Tum Milo Toh Sahi"	Sandesh Shandilya		
Yeh Sunday Kyun Aata Hai	"Main To Hoon King"	Kumar Sanu		Sahil Sultanpuri

=== 2011 ===
Film	Song(s)	Composer(s)	Writer(s)	Co-singer(s)
Aashiqui.in	"Tere Bina"	Prem Hariya, Nitin Kumar Gupta	Nitin Kumar Gupta	
Aashiqui.in	"Tere Bina (remix)	Prem Hariya, Nitin Kumar Gupta	Nitin Kumar Gupta	
Aishwarya	"Phool Dekha Phoolon Ka Rang Dekha"	Vishnu Narayan	Atique Allahabadi	solo
Always Kabhi Kabhi	"Undi The Condi"	Pritam Chakraborty	Irfan Siddiqui	Aditi Singh Sharma
Bin Bulaye Baraati	"Saawan Ka Tha Mahina"	Anand Raj Anand		Gorisha
Bodyguard	"I love You (Unplugged)"	Pritam Chakraborty		Clinton Cerejo
Chargesheet	"Chargesheet (Male Version)"	Anant Joshi	Sanjay Jaydeep	
Chitkabrey	"Aaj Chalein Hum"			Pamela Jain
College Campus	"Tanhai"			Manjeera Ganguly
Desi Boyz	"Let It be"	Pritam	Amitabh Bhattacharya	
Game	"Maine Yeh Kab Socha Tha"	Shankar–Ehsaan–Loy	Javed Akhtar	Anusha Mani, Loy Mendonsa
Gandhi To Hitler	"Yeh Jazba Hai"		Pallavi Sharma	
Hair Is Falling	"Buddhe"			
Hair Is Falling	"Buddhe" (electro mix)			
Khap	"Deewangi"	Anujj Kappoo	Yogesh	Shreya Ghoshal
Khap	"Yeh Wohi To Hai"	Anujj Kappoo	Yogesh	Shreya Ghoshal
Khap	"Yeh Pyaar Kaise Kab Ho Jaaye"	Anujj Kappoo	Yogesh	Shreya Ghoshal
Khap	"Yeh Pyaar Kaise Kab Ho Jaaye" (extended)	Anujj Kappoo	Yogesh	Shreya Ghoshal
Khap	"Is Pyaar Ko Jadugari"	Anujj Kappoo	Yogesh	
Khap	"Aaina Dekha"	Anujj Kappoo	Yogesh	
Loot	"Ajab Hulchal Si"	Shamir Tandon		Kunal Ganjawala, KK, Vasundhara Das, Pinky Chinoy
Me Mamu & 7	"Pyaar Kiya Hai"			
Miley Naa Miley Hum	"Haan Yahi Pyaar Hai"	Sajid–Wajid		Shreya Ghoshal
Mummy Punjabi	"Awaaz Do"	Aadesh Shrivastava	Sameer	Richa Sharma, Akriti Kakkar
Naughty @ 40	"Bichhade Huye"	Monty Sharma		
Satrangee Parachute	"Chal Pade Hum"			
Shivam	"Zindagi Aye Zindagi"	Ramen Barua		Mahalakshmi Iyer
Stand By	"Lad Bappu"			
Stand By	"Khel Khel Mein"			
Stanley Ka Dabba	"Life Bahot Hi Simple Hai"	Hitesh Sonik		
Tum Hi To Ho	"Mere Shamein Mere Savere"	Anand–Milind		Gayatri Ganjawala
U R My Jaan	"Kya Kare Dil Bechara"	Sanjeev-Darshan	Sameer	
Utt Pataang	"Jaanu Na Jaanu Na"	Shamir Tandon		Ahah Shah
Ye Stupid Pyar	"Mehroom Hoon Main"	Vipin Patwa	Yusuf Ali Khan	
Yeh Dooriyan	"I Wanna Be Your Lover"			Gunjan
Yeh Dooriyan	"I Wanna Be Your Lover" (remix)			Gunjan
With Love, Delhi!	"Yummy Yummy"	Sanjoy Chowdhury		
Zokkomon	"Tum Bin Mera Dil Ghabraye"	Shankar–Ehsaan–Loy	Javed Akhtar	

=== 2012 ===
Film	Song(s)	Composer(s)	Writer(s)	Co-singer(s)	Ref.
3 Bachelors	"Dag Mag Dag Mag"	Daboo Malik	Praveen Bhardwaj	Sunidhi Chauhan	
Chaar Din Ki Chandni	"Chaar Din Ki Chandni" (club mix)	Sandesh Shandilya		Sunidhi Chauhan	
Chakradhaar	"Har Mod Pe"	Anand Raj Anand	Sameer		
Chakravyuh	"Paro"	Aadesh Shrivastava		Sunidhi Chauhan, Aadesh Shrivastava	
Chal Pichchur Banate Hain	"Baanwara Mann"	Gaurav Dagaonkar		Sunidhi Chauhan	
Challo Driver	"Umangon Ka Karwan"			Raktima	
Chhodo Kal Ki Baatein	"Chhodo Kal Ki Baatein"				
Chhota Bheem and the Curse of Damyaan	"Jam Jam Jambura"				
Chhota Bheem and the Curse of Damyaan	"Na Haara Hai"				
Ferrari Ki Sawaari	"Ferrari Ki Sawaari"	Pritam	Swanand Kirkire	Boman Irani, Aayush Phukan	
Future To Bright Hai Ji	"Tum Mere Saath Ho"			Sunidhi Chauhan	
Ghost	"Salaame"	Sharib-Toshi		Sharib Sabri	
Housefull 2	"Do You Know"	Sajid–Wajid	Sameer	Shreya Ghoshal	
Housefull 2	"Do You Know (remix)"	Sajid–Wajid	Sameer	Shreya Ghoshal	
I M 24	"Ye Kya Hua"	Jatin Pandit, Jaspal Moni	Rani Malik		
Love Possible	"Kya Karun Main"				
Love Recipe	"Tishnagi"				
Love Recipe	"Kare Kya Hum"				
Mere Dost Picture Abhi Baki Hai	"Sanam Sanam"			Shraddha Pandit	
Milte Hai Chance by Chance	"Morning Walk"				
Phans	"Kis Kis Bahane"				
Prem Mayee	"Kanak Kiran"	Abhishek Ray			
Prem Mayee	"Veenavadini Symphony"	Abhishek Ray			
Qasam Se Qasam Se	"Har Varak"	Shailendra Kumar	Panchhi Jalonvi		
Rakhtbeej	"Bolbala"				
Riwayat	"Tum Jo Mile Ho"			Shreya Ghoshal	
Rush	"Chup Chup Ke"	Pritam		Muazzam, Rizwan Ali Khan	
Say Yes to Love	"Jabse Dekha Hai Tujhe"	Jatin Pandit	Jalees Sherwani	Khushi	
Say Yes to Love	"Koi Kaam Aisa Kar Du"	Jatin Pandit	Jalees Sherwani		
Teri Meri Kahaani	"That's What I Really Wanna Do"	Sajid–Wajid	Prasoon Joshi	Shreya Ghoshal	
Tezz	"Tezz (Male)"	Sajid–Wajid	Jalees Sherwani		
Tezz	"Tezz (Male Remix)"	Sajid–Wajid	Jalees Sherwani		
Umang	"Bekhudi"				
Umang	"Bekhudi" (duet)			Sanjeevani	
Yeh Jo Mohabbat Hai	"Kyon Kyon"	Anu Malik	Faiz Anwar	Shreya Ghoshal	
Zindagi Tere Naam	"Milne Ko Nahi Aaye"	Sajid–Wajid	Jalees Sherwani, Faiz Anwar Quereshi	Sunidhi Chauhan	
Zindagi Tere Naam	Milney Ko Nahi Aaye (male)	Sajid–Wajid	Jalees Sherwani, Faiz Anwar Quereshi		

=== 2013 ===
Film	Song(s)	Composer(s)	Writer(s)	Co-singer(s)	Ref.
Ankhon Dekhi	"Hakka Bakka"				
Ankur Arora Murder Case	"Roshni"	Gourav Dasgupta	Sagar Lahauri		
Bombay Talkies	"Apna Bombay Talkies"				
Chehra - The Unknown Mask	"Hum Tum"				
Chhota Bheem and the Throne of Bali	"Bali Bali Bali"				
Chhota Bheem and the Throne of Bali	"Bali Bali Bali" (version 2)				
Dekha Jo Pehli Baar	"Love All"				
Himmatwala	"Bum Pe Laat"	Sajid–Wajid	Sameer	Soham Chakraborty, Shubh Mukherjee	
Hum Hai Raahi Car Ke	"Nachlay Nachlay"	Sangeet-Siddharth		Monali Thakur	
I Don't Luv U	"Mera Chhuta Guitar"	Amit Kasaria	Amit Kasaria		
I, Me Aur Main	"Meri Jaaniye"	Gourov Dasgupta	Manthan	Monali Thakur	
It's Rocking Dard-e-Disco	"Cut to Disco"	Bappi Lahiri			
It's Rocking Dard-e-Disco	"Cut to Disco" (remix)	Bappi Lahiri			
Koi Hai Apna	"Sanson Ko Aa Ke Chhu Le"			Sanjeevani	
Kyun Hua Achanak	"Jannat Ke Pallu Se"			Nihira Joshi	
Life Mein Hungama Hai	"School Bolta Hai"	Jeet Ganguly			
Luv U Soniyo	"Palko Pe Phool"	Vipin Patwa	Dr. Sagar	Shreya Ghoshal	
Luv U Soniyo	"Chalo Chalte Hai Mexico"	Sunil Bhatia	Sunil Bhatia		
Nasha	"Besharan"			Anusha Mani	
Paapi: Ek Satya Katha	"Mohabbat Bin To Ye Jeevan"	Subhayu	Sameer		
Paapi: Ek Satya Katha	"Ye Hai Raavan Ka Raj"	Subhayu	Sameer		
Rajdhani Express	"Armaan Jagaati Hai"				
Rajjo	"Mere Dil Ki Train"	Uttam Singh			
Raqt	"Tu Hi Tu"	Daboo Malik	Panchhi Jalonvi	Akriti Kakkar	
Shootout at Wadala	"Aye Manya"	Meet Bros Anjjan		Adnan Sami, Meet Bros Anjjan	
Vidhwaa - Kahani Ek Aurat Ki	"Saathiya"				

=== 2014 ===
Film	Song(s)	Composer(s)	Writer(s)	Co-singer(s)
18.11: A Code of Secrecy	"Eagle Sa Ego Hai"			
Badlapur Boys	"Do Akhiyyan"	Sachin Gupta	Sameer	Mahalakshmi Iyer
Balwinder Singh Famous Ho Gaya	"Kenny Ji"	Lalit Pandit		
Balwinder Singh Famous Ho Gaya	"Bhopu"	Lalit Pandit		Mika Singh
Dee Saturday Night	"Saturday Night"	Ankut Tiwari	Sandeep Nath	
Gollu Aur Pappu	"Hum Dono"			
Izhaar Maine Kiya Nahi	"Tu Hai Kahan"			Neeraj Shrivastava
Jai Ho	"Tere Naina Maar Hi Daalenge"	Sajid–Wajid	Sameer	Shreya Ghoshal
Kaash Tum Hote	"Kaash Tum Hote" (Duet version II)	Ram Shankar	Sudhakar Sharma	Alka Yagnik
Kahin Hai Mera Pyar	"Kahin Hai Mera Pyar"	Ravindra Jain	Ravindra Jain	
Kahin Hai Mera Pyar	"Tu Hase Toh"	Ravindra Jain	Ravindra Jain	Shreya Ghoshal
Life Mein Twist Hai	Nasamajh Tum"	Aryan Jaiin		
Lucky Kabootar	"Main Nahi Rehna Tere Naal"	Santokh Singh		Sunidhi Chauhan, Uvie
M3 – Midsummer Midnight Mumbai	"Jabse Juda Teri Ada"	Sujeet Chaubey		
M3 – Midsummer Midnight Mumbai	"Tu Mera Pyaar"	Sujeet Chaubey		
Machhli Jal Ki Rani Hai	"Sau Dil Bhi Hote"	Amit Mishra		Mahalakshmi Iyer
Money Back Guarantee	"Money Back Guarantee"			
PK	"Chaar Kadam"	Shantanu Moitra	Swanand Kirkire	Shreya Ghoshal

=== 2015 ===
Film	Song(s)	Composer(s)	Writer(s)	Co-singer(s)	Ref.
Blue Mountains	"Get Set Go"	Aadesh Shrivastava			
Bachpan Ek Dhokha	"Shararaton Ka Bachpan"	Gaurav Dasgupta			
Ek Adbhut Dakshina Guru Dakshina	"Zara Zara				
Chehere: A Modern Day Classic	"Jo Ab Jaa Chuke"	Jaideep Choudhary	Sayeed Quadri	Shilpa Rao, Mahalaxmi Iyer	
Hum Baja Bajaa Denge	"Har Ghadi"	Nikhil Kamath		Asha Bhosle	
Hum Tum Dushman Dushman	"Tu Mera Yaar Nahi"				
I Love NY	"Halki Halki"	Pritam	Mayur Puri	Tulsi Kumar	
Kaagaz Ke Fools	"Sharari Rampaa"				
Mumbai Can Dance Saala	"Mahiya"	Bappi Lahiri		Alka Yagnik	
Prem Ratan Dhan Payo	"Aaj Unse Milna Hai"	Himesh Reshammiya	Irshad Kamil		
Prem Ratan Dhan Payo	"Murli Ki Taanon Si"	Himesh Reshammiya	Irshad Kamil		
Prem Ratan Dhan Payo	"Aaj Unse Kehna Hai"	Himesh Reshammiya	Irshad Kamil	Aishwarya Majumdar, Palak Muchhal	
Singh Is Bliing	"Cinema Dekhe Mamma"	Sajid–Wajid		Wajid Ali, Ritu Pathak	

=== 2016 ===
Film	Song(s)	Composer(s)	Writer(s)	Co-singer(s)	Ref.
1920 London	"Tujhko Mein"	Sharib Sabri, Toshi Sabri	Azim Shirazi		
30 Minutes	"Take It Easy"	Parminder Pal Singh	Naresh Vikal		
Awesome Mausam	"Tere Naina Mere Naino Se"	Komal Aran Atariya		Palak Muchhal	
Deewaren	"Deewaren: The Unity Song"	Vinay Jaiswal		Suraj Jagan, Sukhwinder Singh, Ash King, Javed Ali, Kunal Ganjawala, Jonita Gandhi	
Extraordinaari	"Duwaon Mein Tujhe"	Hriju Roy		Mahalakshmi Iyer	
Fredrick	"Tera Zikra"	Sujoy Bose	Diksha Jyoti	Rimi Dhar	
Great Grand Masti	"Lipstick Laga Ke"	Superbia	Sameer	Payal Dev	
Love Day - Pyaar Ka Din	"Oh Saheba"	Sumesh Himanshu	Himanshu Joshi	Shreya Shaleen	
Luv U Alia	"Kamakshi"	Jassie Gift			
Sanam Re	"Chhote Chhote Tamashe"	Jeet Ganguly	Manoj Muntashir		
Waarrior Savitri	"Night and Day"	Param Gill	Param Gill	Supriya	
Zamaanat	"Ore Baba Ola"	Viju Shah	Sameer	Shreya Ghoshal	

=== 2017 ===
Film	Song(s)	Composer(s)	Writer(s)	Co-singer(s)	Ref.
Angrezi Mein Kehte Hain	"Meri Aankhein"	Pravin Kunwar	Yogesh	Vaishali Mhade, Pravin Kunwar	
Babuji Ek Ticket Bambai	Dhokha Hai Dhokha Ishq Main	Bhupinder Kaur, Haider Najmi	Umesh Tarkaswar	Shabab Sabri	
Call for Fun	"Paisa Paisa"	Lalit Pandit			
Coffee with D	Nation Wants To Know"	Superbia	Sameer		
Coffee with D	"Tumhari Mohabbat"	Superbia	Sameer	Aakanksha Sharma	
Gol Time - Gang of Littles	"Mummy Papa"				
Mr. Kabaadi	"Naina Lage"			Madhushree	
Patel Ki Punjabi Shaadi	"Meri Mehendi"	Uttank Vora	Sanjay Chhel	Neha Kakkar, Parthiv Gohil	
Patel Ki Punjabi Shaadi	"What's Up O Mata Rani"	Uttank Vora	Sanjay Chhel	Roop Kumar Rathod	
The Final Exit	"Ye Lamha"				

=== 2018 ===
Denotes films that have not yet been released

Film	Song(s)	Composer(s)	Writer(s)	Co-singer(s)	Ref.
22 Days	"Khali Sa Hu"	Parivesh Singh			
Baa Baaa Black Sheep	"Baa Baaa Black Sheep"	Superbia	Sunil Sirvaiya	Manisha Chakravarty	
Chal Jaa Bapu	"Chal Jaa Bapu - Title Song"	Shivang Upadhyay, Nishant Kamal Vyas	Ansh Vyas		
Hope Aur Hum	Aye Zindagi	Rupert Fernandes	Saurabh Dikshit		
Hotel Milan	"Alauddin"	Harshit Saxena			
Mausam Ikrar Ke Do Pal Pyar Ke	"Do Pal Pyar Ke"	Bappi Lahiri	Deepak Sneh	Palak Muchhal	
Saheb, Biwi Aur Gangster 3	"Aye Huzoor"	Rana Mazumder		Sunidhi Chauhan	

=== 2019 ===
Denotes films that have not yet been released

Film Name(s)	Song	Composer(s)	Writer(s)	Co-singer(s)	Ref.
72 Hours: Martyr Who Never Died	"Sau Jahan"	Sunjoy Bose	Vikas Chauhan		
72 Hours: Martyr Who Never Died	"Door"	Sunjoy Bose	Seema Saini		
72 Hours: Martyr Who Never Died	"Ab toh Chal Padhe"	Sunjoy Bose	Nishant Mishra	Sunjoy Bose	
Jhol	"Ho Raha Hai"	Bapi-Tutul		Shweta Pandit	
Khamiyaza	"Khamiyaza - Title Track"	Sujoy Bose	Diksha Jyoti		
Kirket	"Vandemataram"				
Love In College	"Tose Jo Naina Lage"			Sushmita Yadav	
Love In College	"Kuch Alag Sa Nasha"			Sushmita Yadav	
Milan Talkies	"Din Dahade"	Rana Mazumder	Amitabh Bhattacharya	Neeraj Shridhar, Rana Mazumder	
Sye Raa Narasimha Reddy	"Jaago re Narasimha Jaagore"	Amit Trivedi	Swanand Kirkire	Udit Narayan, Shankar Mahadevan	
Total Dhamaal	"Mungada"	Gourov-Roshin		Jyotica Tangri, Subhro Ganguly	

=== 2020 ===
Denotes films that have not yet been released

Film name	Song(s)	Composer(s)	Writer(s)	Co-singer(s)	Ref.
Baaghi 3	"Dus Bahane 2.0"	Vishal–Shekhar	Panchhi Jalonvi	Vishal Dadlani, Shekhar Ravjiani, KK, Tulsi Kumar	
Baaghi 3	"Tujhe Rab Mana"	Rochak Kohli	Gautam G Sharma, Gurpreet Saini		
English Ki Taay Taay Fiss	"English Ki Taay Taay Fiss"				
Namumkin Tere Bin Jeena	"Hum Tum Jo Mile"	Monty Sharma	Sunil Sirvaiya		
Yaara	"Har Dafaa"	Superbia	Prashant Ingole, Sunil Sirvaiya	Shruti Rane	
It's My Life	"Na Samajh Dil"	Shankar–Ehsaan–Loy	Nilesh Mishra		
The Forgotten Army - Azaadi Ke Liye	"Chanda"	Pritam	Kausar Munir		

=== 2021 ===
Film name	Song(s)	Composer(s)	Writer(s)	Co-singer(s)	Ref.
Tez Raftaar	"Dhoop Mein Chalke"	Rajiv-Mona	Ravi Basnet		

=== 2022 ===
Film name	Song(s)	Composer(s)	Writer(s)	Co-singer(s)	Ref.
Valimai (Hindi)	"Mother Song"	Yuvan Shankar Raja	Sameer		
RK/RKay	"Meri Jaan"	Sagar Desai	Hussain Haidry		
Love You Loktantra	"Na Jaane Kyun Dhadka Dil"	Lalit Pandit	Sanjay Chhel	Amruta Fadnavis	
Ponniyin Selvan: I	"Rakshas Mama Re"	A. R. Rahman	Mehboob Kotwal	Shreya Ghoshal, Mahesh Vinayakram	
Life Is Good	"Sapna Pala"	Abhishek Ray	Nivedita Joshi		
Salaam Venky	"Badi Zindagi"	Mithoon	Kausar Munir		

=== 2023 ===
Film name	Song(s)	Composer(s)	Writer(s)	Co-singer(s)	Ref.
Happi	"Phata Yeh Sole Hai"	Ilaiyaraaja	Jaideep Sahani		
Chhipkali	"Zinda Hoon Main"	Meemo	Soham Majumdar		
Bad Boy	"Saajnaa" (Reprise)	Himesh Reshammiya	Shabbir Ahmed		
Music School	"Christmas Ki Raath"	Ilaiyaraaja	Dr.Sagar, Raman Raghuvanshi		
Nimmo Lucknow Wali	"Rukna Tu Chalte Jana"	Yug Bhusal	Junaid Ali		
Adipurush	"Jai Shri Ram"	Ajay-Atul	Manoj Muntashir		
Fire of Love Red	"Tumhe Yaad Ho Ki Na Ho"	Hriju Roy	Ravi Basnet	Reema Nathaniel	
Fire of Love Red	"Zaalima"	Hriju Roy	Ravi Basnet		
Ishq-e-Nadaan	"Ishq-E-Nadaan-Title Track"	Raja Narayan Deb	Gunjan Nanda		
Love Nation	"Khoda Pahaad Nikla Chuha"	Manoj Nayan	Dr.Moazzam Azm	Brijesh Shandilya, Saurabh Mukherjee	
Hum Tumhe Chahte Hain	"Oh My Love"	Bappi Lahiri	Rajann Lyallppuri	Alka Yagnik	
Mujib: The Making of a Nation	"Abujh Majhi"	Shantanu Moitra	Atul Tiwari		
12th Fail	"Bolo Na"	Shantanu Moitra	Swanand Kirkire	Shreya Ghoshal	
12th Fail	"Restart"	Shantanu Moitra	Swanand Kirkire	Swanand Kirkire, Shantanu Moitra, Vidhu Vinod Chopra	
12th Fail	"Restart - Rap 'N' Folk"	Shantanu Moitra	Swanand Kirkire	Raftaar, Swanand Kirkire, Shantanu Moitra, Vidhu Vinod Chopra	
SCAR	"Ab Jab Ho Hi Gaya Hai Tumse Pyaar"	Prini Siddhant Madhav	Atique Allahabadi	Palak Muchhal	
Pind Daan	"Aakhri Jung"	Samarth Saxena	Sameer		
Dunki	"Durr Kahi Durr"	Pritam	Swanand Kirkire	Shreya Ghoshal	Unreleased
Flames	"Dil Ka Syllabus"	Arabinda Neog	JUNO	Prathikyaa Sarmaa	

=== 2024 ===
Film name	Song(s)	Composer(s)	Writer(s)	Co-singer(s)	Ref.
Operation Valentine	"Rab Hain Gawah"	Mickey J. Meyer	Kumaar		
Zehan	"Rang Rasiya"	Anjana Ankur Singh	Shakir Raza Warsi		
IRaH	"Manchale"	Karthik Ramalingam	Rahul Kumar Shukla	Sunidhi Chauhan	
Gauraiya Live	"Maati Oh Maati"	Sunjoy Bose	Seema Saini		
Gauraiya Live	"Dhyan Dijo"	Seema Saini	Seema Saini	Sadhna Sargam	
Zindagi Kashmakash	"Zindagi Kashmakash"	Manish Sahariya	Nirnimesh Dube	Aditi Singh Sharma, Parul Mishra	
Chhota Bheem and the Curse of Damyaan	"Zara Muskura"	Raghav Sachar	Kunwar Juneja	Kiaan Sachar, Riaan Rosemeyer, Simar Singh	
Chandu Champion	"Jeet Ka Geet"	Pritam	Kausar Munir		
Maharaj	"Holi Ke Rang Ma"	Sohail Sen	Kausar Munir	Shreya Ghoshal, Osman Mir	
Amaran (D)	"Mann Re Mann Re"	G. V. Prakash Kumar	Sajeev Sarathie	Swetha Ashok	
Love Garage	"Nabz Mein Tu Hai"	Monty Sharma	Sunil Sirvaiya	Hargun Kaur	
Zero Se Restart	"Chal Zero Pe Chalte Hai"	Shantanu Moitra	Swanand Kirkire	Shankar Mahadevan, Sonu Nigam, Vidhu Vinod Chopra	
Vanvaas	"Chhabili Ke Naina"	Monty Sharma	Sunil Sirvaiya	Nana Patekar, Sanchari Sengupta, Monty Sharma, Gaurav Chati	
Mufasa: The Lion King	"Tell Me It's You"	Lin-Manuel Miranda	Lin-Manuel Miranda	Kamakshi Ray	
Mufasa: The Lion King	"We Go Together"	Lebo M	Lin-Manuel Miranda	Meiyang Chang, Thomson Andrews, Gaurav Bangia, Kamakshi Ray	
Mufasa: The Lion King	"I Always Wanted A Brother"	Nicholas Britell	Lin-Manuel Miranda	Meiyang Chang, Johna Hodywalla, Trilok Sunderasan	
Barroz 3D	"Isabella"	Lydian Nadhaswaram	Runa Rizvi Sivamani		

=== 2025 ===
Film name	Song(s)	Composer(s)	Writer(s)	Co-singer(s)	Ref.
Dil Awara	"Dil Awara-Title Track"	Nabz	Youngveer		
Mission Grey House	"Yaariyan Yaariyan"	Hriju Roy	Amitabh Ranjan		
Mission Grey House	"Yaariyan Yaariyan-Sad"	Hriju Roy	Amitabh Ranjan		
Mission Grey House	"Yaariyan Yaariyan-Duet"	Hriju Roy	Amitabh Ranjan	Reema	
Hisaab Barabar	"Mann Mann Rangeyo"	Aman Pant	Akhil Tiwari	Barbie Rajput	
Humsaaz: The Musical	"Hum Pyaar Ki Raah Par"	Anweshaa	Joydeb Majumdar	Anweshaa	
Bobby Aur Rishi Ki Love Story	"Koi Koi"	Shaan	Kunal Kohli	Akriti Kakar	
Kuch Sapney Apne	"Udaa Udaa Udaa"	Priyabrata Panigrahi	Saagar Gupta		
Pintu Ki Pappi	"Mushy Girl"	DR.NITZ a.k.a. NITIN 'NITZ' ARORA feat. Sonny KC	DR.NITZ a.k.a. NITIN 'NITZ' ARORA feat. Sonny KC		
Sikandar	"Bam Bam Bhole"	Pritam	Sameer	Dev Negi, Antara Mitra	
Kannappa	"Love Song"	Stephen Devassy	Girish Nakod	Sahithi Chaganti	
Kannappa	"Tu Mere Asmaan"	Mani Sharma	Girish Nakod	Sahithi Chaganti	
Kill Dill	"Meri Zindagi"	Shaan	Kunwar Juneja	Arpita Chakravarty	
Kill Dill	"Adhoorey"	Shaan	Kunwar Juneja	Arpita Chakravarty	
Costao	"Pedro"	Ajay Jayanthi	Ginny Diwan		
Hai Junoon!	"Le Chal Wahan- Shaan's Version"	Akshay Menon	Anweshaa, Taranginee Gupta		
Hai Junoon!	"Le Chal Wahan- Duet Version"	Akshay Menon	Anweshaa, Taranginee Gupta	Natalie Di Luccio	
Hai Junoon!	"Jeena Yahan"	Shankar-Jaikishan, Rajdeep Ghosh	Shaily Shailendra, Ankit K Sharma	Anusha Mani	
Kesari Veer	"Pighal Ke Panahon Mein"	Monty Sharma	Sanchari Sengupta	Neeti Mohan	
Janki	"Tu Hasti Rahe"	Toshant Kumar, Monika Verma	Monika Verma	Monika Verma	
Fauji 2	"Tiranga"	Shashi Suman	Prashant Ingole		
Murderbaad	"Mast Mast"	Rickie	Kuku Prabhas	Amit Mutreja	
Murderbaad	"Mast Mast-Reprise"	Rickie	Kuku Prabhas	Amit Mutreja	
Murderbaad	"Yahaan Koi Nahi Tera"	Rickie	Kuku Prabhas		
Well Done CA Sahab!	"Khwabdariyaan"	Mukt	Raaj Kothari		
Tanvi The Great	"Tanvi Ki Jai"	M.M. Keeravani	Kausar Munir	Shagun Sodhi, Gomathi Iyer	
Della Bella	"Jo Hota Hai"	Raaj Aashoo	Neelesh Kumar Jain	Seepi Jha	
Andaaz 2	"Shammak"	Nadeem Saifi	Sameer		
Mannu Kya Karegga	"Halki Halki Barish"	Lalit Pandit	Javed Akhtar	Akriti Kakar	
Mannu Kya Karegga	"Mannu Tera Kya Hoga"	Lalit Pandit	Kumaar	Manasi Ghosh, Akanksha Sinha, Mellow D	

=== 2026 ===
Film name	Song(s)	Composer(s)	Writer(s)	Co-singer(s)	Ref.
Shatak	"Yug Yug Jiye"	Sunny Inder	Kumaar	Madhushree	
Obsess	"I Was A Spark"	Sunjoy Bose	Ozil Dalal		
Ab Hoga Hisaab	"Saaiyaan Ve"	Kshitij Tarey	Pulaestya		
Ikka	"Papa Ki Jaan"	Mithoon	Sayeed Qadri		
The India Story	"Gubbara Chaand Ka"	Mangesh Dhadke	Shakeel Azmi	Shreya Ghoshal, Adwita Pawar	
Batwara 1947	"Kahaan Chale Gaye Ho Ram"	A.R. Rahman	Javed Akhtar	Anuradha Paudwal	
Haiwaan	"Mere Hero Hai Woh"	Pritam	Javed Akhtar	Vanika Nayak	
Haiwaan	"Rangiyara"	Pritam	Yatindra Mishra	Sukhwinder Singh, Romy	

=== Unreleased Hindi film songs ===
† : denotes officially unreleased songs
TBA : to be announced

Film	No	Song	Composer(s)	Lyricist(s)	Co-artist(s)
Pareshaanpur	1	TBA	Raaj Aashoo		

== Hindi non-film songs ==
=== Albums ===
Year	Album	Song	Composer	Writer	Co-singer(s)	Notes	Ref.
1995	The New Album	"Jhoothe"	Salim-Sulaiman		Shweta Shetty	First album released as a featured artist.	
1995	The New Album	"Silsile"	Salim-Sulaiman		Shweta Shetty	First album released as a featured artist.	
1995	Oorja	"Q-Funk"	Phill and Jerry		Shweta Shetty, Style Bhai, Sagarika, Babul Supriyo, Jerry	First Remix Album released	
1995	Roop Inka Mastana	"Roop Tera Mastana"	(Remixed by Raju Singh)		Style Bhai	Remix Album	
1995	Roop Inka Mastana	"Dil Aisa Kisi Ne"	(Remixed by Raju Singh)		Solo	Remix Album	
1995	Roop Inka Mastana	"Musafir Hoon Yaro"	(Remixed by Raju Singh)		Solo	Remix Album	
1995	Roop Inka Mastana	"Pyaar Hua Ikrar Hua"	(Remixed by Raju Singh)		Sagarika	Remix Album	
1996	Naujawan	"Naujawan" (Title Song)	Biddu	Sagarika, Shaan	Solo	India's first sibling duo album released The track "Aisa Hota Hai" and "Disco Deewane" were reused in Tamil Song as "Paarthal Kaangal" and "Paara Ushar".	
1996	Naujawan	Aisa Hota Hai	Biddu	Sagarika, Shaan	Solo	India's first sibling duo album released The track "Aisa Hota Hai" and "Disco Deewane" were reused in Tamil Song as "Paarthal Kaangal" and "Paara Ushar".	
1996	Naujawan	Disco Deewane	Biddu	Anwar Khalid	Sagarika	India's first sibling duo album released The track "Aisa Hota Hai" and "Disco Deewane" were reused in Tamil Song as "Paarthal Kaangal" and "Paara Ushar".	
1996	Naujawan	Meri Wafa	Biddu	Sagarika	Sagarika	India's first sibling duo album released The track "Aisa Hota Hai" and "Disco Deewane" were reused in Tamil Song as "Paarthal Kaangal" and "Paara Ushar".	
1996	Naujawan	"Aap Jaisa Koi"	Biddu	Indeevar	Solo	India's first sibling duo album released The track "Aisa Hota Hai" and "Disco Deewane" were reused in Tamil Song as "Paarthal Kaangal" and "Paara Ushar".	
1996	Naujawan	"Armaan Dil Ke"	Biddu	Raajesh Johri	Solo	India's first sibling duo album released The track "Aisa Hota Hai" and "Disco Deewane" were reused in Tamil Song as "Paarthal Kaangal" and "Paara Ushar".	
1996	Naujawan	"Dekh"	Biddu	Raajesh Johri	Solo	India's first sibling duo album released The track "Aisa Hota Hai" and "Disco Deewane" were reused in Tamil Song as "Paarthal Kaangal" and "Paara Ushar".	
1996	Jhumka Gira Re	"Gata Rahe Mera Dil"			Sagarika	Remix Album; Last album to be release under the "Shantanu" artist name.	
1996	Jhumka Gira Re	"Mang Ke Sath Tumhara"			Sagarika	Remix Album; Last album to be release under the "Shantanu" artist name.	
1996	Jhumka Gira Re	"Ghungroo Tut Gaye"			Solo	Remix Album; Last album to be release under the "Shantanu" artist name.	
1996	Bollywood Sensation 2 (Note: All the tracks are cover versions of classic Bollywood hits, which have been recomposed and rearranged by Shaan. The credits mentioned here refer to the composers and writers of the original songs, as listed in the Audio CD.)	"Humdum Mere"	Shaan	Majrooh Sultanpuri	Solo	His last classical remix album before transitioning to independent album.	
1996	Bollywood Sensation 2	"Ehasan Tera Hoga"	Shaan	Hasrat Jaipuri	Solo	His last classical remix album before transitioning to independent album.	
1996	Bollywood Sensation 2	"Yaad Na Jaye"	Shaan	Shailendra	Solo	His last classical remix album before transitioning to independent album.	
1996	Bollywood Sensation 2	"Teri Rab Ne Banadee Jori"	Shaan	Anand Bakshi	Solo	His last classical remix album before transitioning to independent album.	
1996	Bollywood Sensation 2	"Tumhi Mere Mandir"	Shaan	Rajendra Krishan	Solo	His last classical remix album before transitioning to independent album.	
1996	Bollywood Sensation 2	"Janewalo Zara"	Shaan	Majrooh Sultanpuri	Solo	His last classical remix album before transitioning to independent album.	
1997	Love-Ology	"Love-Ology"	Ram Sampath	Manohar Iyer, Shaan	Caliche	Fourth Solo Album released. The track "Love-Ology" and "Just baby with Just Good Friend" also appears in his Sister's first solo album Maa as Bonus Tracks.	
1997	Love-Ology	"Just baby with Just Good Friend"	Ram Sampath	Manohar Iyer	Sagarika, Hema Sardesai	Fourth Solo Album released. The track "Love-Ology" and "Just baby with Just Good Friend" also appears in his Sister's first solo album Maa as Bonus Tracks.	
1997	Love-Ology	Nai Koi Hoga	Ram Sampath	Nida Fazil		Fourth Solo Album released. The track "Love-Ology" and "Just baby with Just Good Friend" also appears in his Sister's first solo album Maa as Bonus Tracks.	
1997	Love-Ology	Mushkil Mein Dil	Ram Sampath	Shaan		Fourth Solo Album released. The track "Love-Ology" and "Just baby with Just Good Friend" also appears in his Sister's first solo album Maa as Bonus Tracks.	
1997	Love-Ology	Soona Re Soona	Ram Sampath	Shaan		Fourth Solo Album released. The track "Love-Ology" and "Just baby with Just Good Friend" also appears in his Sister's first solo album Maa as Bonus Tracks.	
1997	Love-Ology	Dil Ki Baatein	Ram Sampath	Shaan		Fourth Solo Album released. The track "Love-Ology" and "Just baby with Just Good Friend" also appears in his Sister's first solo album Maa as Bonus Tracks.	
1997	Love-Ology	Sada Ke Liye	Ram Sampath	Shaan		Fourth Solo Album released. The track "Love-Ology" and "Just baby with Just Good Friend" also appears in his Sister's first solo album Maa as Bonus Tracks.	
1997	Love-Ology	Pehchan Lo	Ram Sampath	Shaan		Fourth Solo Album released. The track "Love-Ology" and "Just baby with Just Good Friend" also appears in his Sister's first solo album Maa as Bonus Tracks.	
1997	A Reason To Smile	"Fifty Fifty"	Raju Singh	Arjun Raaj	Sagarika		
1997	A Reason To Smile	"Wajha Muskurane Ki"	Salim-Sulaiman	Dev Kohli	Mehnaz Hoosein, Daler mehndi, Anu Malik, Sagarika, Suneeta Rao, Style Bhai, Hema Sardesai, Sonu Nigam		
1998	Maa	Culture Mix	Salim–Sulaiman	Shaan	Various		
1999	Tanha Dil	"Aankhon Mein Sapne Liye"	Ram Sampath	Shaan	Solo	Also appears many compilation and other albums like The Complete Bhupen Hazarika as a hidden track, Mere Liye as a bonus track etc.	
1999	Tanha Dil	"Gumsum Haun Kyun"	Shaan	Shaan	Solo		
1999	Tanha Dil	"Tu ja Na Koi"	Shaan	Shaan	Solo		
1999	Tanha Dil	"Is Pyar Mein"	Shaan	Shaan	Solo		
1999	Tanha Dil	"Bhool Ja"	Shaan	Shaan	Solo		
1999	Tanha Dil	"Faasale"	Shaan	Shaan	Solo		
1999	Tanha Dil	"Tu Hai Kahan"	Shaan	Shaan	Solo		
1999	Tanha Dil	"Shaan Se"	Shaan	Shaan	Solo		
2000	The Complete Bhupen Hazarika	"Ganga"	Bhupen Hazarika	Bhupen Hazarika	Sagarika, Kavita Krishnamurthy, Ishaan, Hema Sardesai		
2000	The Complete Bhupen Hazarika	"Door Paharon Ke"	Bhupen Hazarika	Amitabh Verma	Mahalakshmi Iyer		
2000	The Complete Bhupen Hazarika	"Tanha Dil Tanha Safar" (Instrumental)	Ram Sampath	Shaan	Solo	Instrumental Version; Hidden Track only, not mentioned on the tracklist.	
2001	Mere Liye	"Hum Ke Liye"	Sagarika		Solo		
2001	Mere Liye	"Musafir Hoon Yaaron"	Farhad Wadia	Gulzar	Solo	Desi Mix Version; Originally performed by Kishore Kumar.	
2001	Mere Liye	"Tanha Dil Tanha Safar"	Ram Sampath	Shaan	Solo	CD Bonus Track Only; Taken from his album Tanha Dil	
2002	Channel [V] Jammin	"Deewana"	Shaan	Shaan	Solo		
2011	Teri Aankhein	"Kehta Hai Dil"	Raaj Ashoo				
2024	Aarti Sangrah	"Aarti Kunj Bihari Ki"	Traditional	Traditional	Solo		
2024	Aarti Sangrah	"Jay Ganesh Deva"	Traditional	Traditional	Solo		
2024	Aarti Sangrah	"Jay Shani Dev"	Traditional	Traditional	Solo		
2024	Aarti Sangrah	"Om Jai Ambe Gauri"	Traditional	Traditional	Solo		
2024	Aarti Sangrah	"Om Jai Jagadeesh Hare"	Traditional	Traditional	Solo		
2024	Aarti Sangrah	"Om Jai Lakshmi Mata"	Traditional	Traditional	Solo		
2024	Aarti Sangrah	"Om Jai Saraswati Maata"	Traditional	Traditional	Solo		
2024	Aarti Sangrah	"Om Jai Shiv Onkara"	Traditional	Traditional	Solo		

=== EPs ===
Year	EP(s)	Song	Composer	Writer	Co-singer(s)	Notes	Ref.
2025	Ghazal Ho Gayi	"Jab Bhi Woh Muskurane Lagte Hai"	Shaan	Haider Amaan Haider	Solo	First Ghazal EP album	
2025	Ghazal Ho Gayi	"Use Dekhe Zamana Ho Gaya"	Shaan	Haider Amaan Haider	Solo	First Ghazal EP album	
2025	Ghazal Ho Gayi	"Bande Dhadkan"	Shaan	Haider Amaan Haider	Solo	First Ghazal EP album	
2025	Ghazal Ho Gayi	"Ghazal Ho Gayi"	Shaan	Haider Amaan Haider	Solo	First Ghazal EP album	
2025	Ghazal Ho Gayi	"Yun Jo Pardes Mein"	Shaan	Haider Amaan Haider	Solo	First Ghazal EP album	
2025	Ghazal Ho Gayi	"Phir Hui Shaam"	Shaan	Haider Amaan Haider	Solo	First Ghazal EP album	

=== Singles ===
Year	Song	Composer	Writer	Co-singer(s)	Notes	Ref.
2002	Kyun Hota Hai Pyarrr	Jeet-Pritam	Abbas Tyrewala	Sunidhi Chauhan		
2003	Jassi Jaisi Koi Nahin					
2016	Ho Halla	Rishikesh Pandey				
2016	Tum Ho Toh Lagta Hai	Amaal Malik				
2017	Hai Halla	Rishikesh Pandey		Payal Dev		
2017	Gazab Ka Hai Din/Bawara Mann	Abhijit Vaghani	Anand Srivastav, Milind Srivastav, Junaid Wasi			
2017	Sun Zara/Tujhe Bhula Diya	Abhijit Vaghani	Sameer, Kumaar, Vishal Dadlani			
2017	Surilee	Shaan	Kunwar Juneja			
2018	DuckTales					
2018	Adhoorey	Shaan (singer)	Kunwar Juneja	Ritu Agarwal		
2018	Hukus Bukus	Shaan	Rajesh Manthan	Shubh Mukherjee		
2019	Naseeba	Shaan	Kunwar Juneja			
2019	Tu Mera Rab Hai	Shaan (singer)	Rajesh Manthan			
2019	Issi Ko Pyaar Kehte Hai	Ghansham Vasvani	Nida Fazli			
2019	It's Natural	Shaan				
2020	Jaane Kyon Log Mohabbat			Palak Muchhal		
2020	Rang Barse	Bad-Ash		Mamta Sharma		
2020	Main Tujhko Yaad Karta Hoon	Shaan	Rashmi Virag			
2020	Sniper	Shaan	Kunwar Juneja			
2021	Yakeen	Shaan	Kunwar Juneja			
2021	Tu Jo Ha Kahe Toh Haan	Shaan & Ganesh Surve	Shaan & Kunwar Juneja			
2021	Ye Faasla	Shaan	Kunwar Juneja			
2021	Tanha Hai Dil	Praveen Bharadwaj				
2021	Tera Hissa Hoon	Shaan	Shaan			
2021	Majboor Ho Gaye	Shaan	Rajesh Manthan			
2021	Thomkiya Thomkiya	Suvam Moitra & Traditional	Manoj Yadav & Traditional	Akriti Kakar		
2021	Tanha Dil Tanha Safar 2.0	Shaan		Solo		
2021	O Mere Channa Vey	Himesh Reshammiya				
2022	Kabhi Kabhie Ittefaq Sey	Nishant Raja		Neeti Mohan		
2022	Rang Le	Shaan	Rajesh Manthan & Traditional			
2022	Bom Billi			Solace Nerwal		
2022	Karpur Gauram	Shaan				
2022	Jee Lenge Hum	Shaan	Mahimma Bhardwaj			
2022	Kaaba Kashi	Manas Mukherjee	Kapil Kumar			
2022	Nahi Mila Mujhe Pyaar Toh Kya			Sonu Nigam		
2022	Sun Le (1 Min Music)	Shaan				
2022	Dil Udeyaa	Shaan	Rajesh Manthan & MD Abdhul Ghani	Unoosha		
2022	Dil Ko Thug Liya	Shabab Sabri	Raman Raghuvanshi	Muskaan		
2022	Phireya	Anish John	Saaveri Verma			
2022	All We Need Is Love	Sagar Dhote	Aditya Kalway & Nikhil Chinchankar	Lopamudra		
2022	Pyaar Mein Tere	Nazakat Shujat	Anjaan Sagri			
2022	Aa Bhi Jaa	Shaan & Gourov Dasgupta	Rajesh Manthan	Jyotica Tangri		
2022	Sajaunga Lutkar Bhi	Dharan Kumar	Kunaal Vermaa	Neeti Mohan		
2022	Aati Hai Toh Welcome	Shaan				
2022	Ek Tu Hi Kaafi Hai	Gourov Dasgupta & Shaan	Prashant Ingole			
2022	The Happy Diwali Song	Shaan	Rajiv Rana			
2022	Thaam Lena	Shantanu Dutta	Seema Saini	Srushti Barlewar		
2022	Chumbaki Aankhen	Shaan	Shaan & Rajib Chakraborty	June Banerjee		
2022	Yeh Sama	Remy Lachman	Jogi			
2022	Baby I Love You	Annabelle		Shannon K		
2023	One India My India 2.0	Mithoon	Sayeed Quadri	Osman Mir, Jubin Nautiyal, Mithoon		
2023	Bairagi Mann	Shaan	Shaan & Rajesh Manthan			
2023	Pal Bhar To Thehro	Prashant Ingole				
2023	Kismat	Shaan	Manju Sanghi			
2023	Nazar Mila	Rajib-Mona	Ravi Basnet	Alka Yagnik		
2023	Tasveer	Shaan	Manju Sanghi			
2023	Khele Holi	Gourov Dasgupta	Shayra Apoorva	Biswaa		
2023	Bura Na Maano Holi Hai	Shaan	Rajiv Rana	Bhoomi Trivedi		
2023	Meri Zindagi	Pavan R Maligi	Pavan R Maligi	Hirushi		
2023	Hum Tum Tum Hum	Shaan	Manju Sanghi	Sagarika	Their first indian sibling duo single.	
2023	Jai Shree Mahakal	Kailash Kher	Kailash Kher	Sonu Nigam, Shankar Mahadevan, Kailash Kher, Arijit Singh		
2023	Shri Ram Chalisa	Shaan				
2023	Pyaar To Bas Pyaar Hai	Shaan	Manju Sanghi			
2023	Shree Hanuman Chalisa	Shaan	Tulsidas			
2023	Teri Aankhon Ki Masti	Bickram Ghosh	Srijato	Mahalaxmi Iyer		
2023	Beete Hue Pal	Panu Ray	Surojit Ray			
2023	Guru Ko Naman	Shaan	Ravi Yadav			
2023	Pal Pal	Shaan	Manju Sanghi			
2023	Yeh Desh	Bickram Ghosh	Sutapa Basu	Hariharan, Bickram Ghosh, Mahalaxmi Iyer, Kavita Seth, Richa Sharma, Bidipta Chakraborty, Rishi Singh, Deboshmita Roy, Chirag Kotwal, Senjuti Das, Mohammad Faiz		
2023	Bharat Maa	Shaan	Aalok Shrivastav			
2023	Nazdeekiyaan	Shaan	Amaan Noor	Anamta Khan		
2023	BHEL Anthem	Lalit Pandit	Javed Akhtar	Sonu Nigam		
2023	Deewano Ne	DJ Sheizwood	Kamaal R. Khan			
2023	Bappa Moraya	Shaan	Rajiv Rana			
2023	Masroof Hum Bahut Hain	Shaan	Aalok Shrivastav			
2023	Tair Jaa	Mann	Mann			
2023	Dil Tera Deewana	Aziz Brothers	Khurshid Hallauri	Alka Yagnik		
2024	Awadh Mein Ram Aaye Hain	Shriyansh Pratap Singh	Harshit Vishwakarma	Devi Chitralekha		
2024	Ayodhya Laute Hai Shri Ram	Kshitij Tarey	Aalok Shrivastav			
2024	Ram Anthem	Shankar Mahadevan	Sameer Anjaan	Shankar Mahadevan, Kailash Kher, Akriti Kakar		
2024	Beh Ja	Shaan				
2024	Tanhaiyyan	Bickram Ghosh	Srijato			
2024	Baatein	Prashant Ingole				
2024	Aao Na	Mann Taneja	Gaurav Pandey			
2024	Jay Jay Kedara	Kailash Kher	Kailash Kher	Kailash Kher, Amitabh Bachchan, Anup Jalota, Shreya Ghoshal, Sonu Nigam, Suresh Wadkar, Prasoon Joshi, Arijit Singh, Shankar Mahadevan, Babul Supriyo		
2024	Namo Namah	Prashant Ingole	Prashant Ingole, Amardeep			
2024	Choti Choti Mulakatein	Gourav Dasgupta	Devshi Khanduri			
2024	Mohabbat Ki Barsaat	Shaan	Rajesh Manthan			
2024	Shiv Ne Poocha Paravti Se	Arghya Banerjee	Ravi Chopra	Payal Dev		
2024	Jane Wala Pal	Rajib-Mona	Sudhakar Sharma			
2024	Behki Behki	Bickram Ghosh	Sutapa Basu			
2024	Jai Ganesha	Aditya Dev	Ravi Chopra	Payal Dev		
2024	Meethi Meethi Barsataein	Gourav Dasgupta	Farhan Memon	Sonia Keshwani		
2024	Dua	Mann Taneja	Gaurav Pandey			
2024	Likhe Jo Khat Tujhe	Shankar–Jaikishan, Abhijit Vaghani	Neeraj, Bhrigu Parashar	PABLO		
2024	Siddhivinayak Deva	Gunwant Sen	Suresh Tiwari Yassh			
2024	Mata Ka Jaikara	Chintu Saarthak Kalla	Prem Baniya			
2024	Patane Ka Tarika	Lalit Sen	Sarvajit Singh			
2024	Rakh Le	Shaan	Rajesh Manthan			
2024	Nai Jaana	Sanjeev Chaturvedi		Hritu Zee		
2024	Mohabbat Mein	Sajid–Wajid	Altamash Abbas	Muskaan		
2024	Chand Wali Boliyaan	Shaan	Mahimma Bhardwaj	Bela Shende		
2024	Apollena				Apollena – Sapno Ki Unchi Udann's Original Soundtrack	
2024	Hamein Dar Lagta Hai	Sajid–Wajid	Subhash Pathak	Niti D Jain		
2024	The Reunion Song	Ashwin Pandya	Manish Trivedi	Pamela Jain		
2025	Ishq Qubool Kar	Shaan	Mahimma Bhardwaj			
2025	BPCL Golden Jubilee Anthem	Shantanu Moitra	Gulzar			
2025	The Spirit of Kala Ghoda Anthem	Shantanu Moitra	Aalok Shrivastav	Ajoy Chakraborty, Usha Uthup, Kaushiki Chakraborty, Papon, Anup Jalota, Shalmali Kholgade, Javed Ali, Rahul Deshpande		
2025	Tera Ho Raha	Shaan	Rajesh Manthan			
2025	Adinath Shambhu	Meenal Nigam	Daleep Chopra	Sonu Nigam, Kailash Kher, Agam Kumar Nigam, Meenal Nigam		
2025	Teri Aankhon Mein	Sanjayraj Gaurinandan	Kausar Naaz			
2026	Apna Hai Mana	Anupam Saikia		Mahalakshmi Iyer		

== Assamese film songs ==
Year	Film	Song	Composer	Writer	Co-singer(s)	Ref.
2000	Jun Jwole Kopalot	"Kuwasun Kuwana"	Jayanta Das	Rubul Bora	Zubeen Garg, Babul Supriyo, Anupam Saikia, Krishnamoni Nath, Jayanta Das	
2000	Jun Jwole Kopalot	"Duru Duru Kope"	Jayanta Das	Unknown	Sagarika	
2001	Aei Morom Tumar Babe	"Jonake Uposa"	Bhupen Uzir	Hemanta Dutta	Sagarika	
2001	Aei Morom Tumar Babe	"Nijanote Guputote"	Bhupen Uzir	Hemanta Dutta	Solo	
2001	I Love You	"Hatore Aanguli"	Anupam Saikia	Anupam Saikia, Zubeen Garg	Sadhana Sargam	
2001	Nayak	"Mon Gahanot"	Zubeen Garg	Zubeen Garg	Zubeen Garg, Pamela Jain	
2002	Eman Morom Kiyo Lage	"Ture Sobi"	Manoj Sharma	Zubeen Garg	Zubeen Garg, Sagarika	
2011	Poley Poley Urey Mon	"Kio baru udakh"			Solo	

== Assamese non-film songs ==
Year	Albums	Song	Composer	Writer	Co-singer(s)	Ref.
2000	Mon	"Hatore Anguli"	Anupam Saikia	Anupam Saikia	Solo	
2001	Akou Mon	"Dehati Fagune Nosuai"	Anupam Saikia	Robin Borah	Solo	
2001	Akou Mon	"Moushumi Ne Monalisa"	Anupam Saikia	Robin Borah	Solo	
2001	Borosha Bohu Asha	"Toktoki Tokarmat"	Jatin Sharma	Shaan	Solo	
2002	Kuwoli	"Kinu Botah Khai Gabhoru Holi"	Abhijeet Barman	Abhijeet Barman	Solo	

== Bengali film songs ==
Year	Film	Song	Composer(s)	Co-singer(s)	Ref.	
2001	Jamaibabu Jindabad	"Tapur Tupur Brishtite"	Babul Bose	Sadhana Sargam		
2002	Kurukshetra	"April Phool"	Ashok Bhadra	Deepmala		
2002	Deva	"Prem Ki Jala Re"	Bappi Lahiri			
2002	Deva	"Tumi Je Monalisa"	Bappi Lahiri	Sunidhi Chauhan		
2002	Protohingsa	"Shopno Amar"	Tabun Sutradhar	Kavita Krishnamurthy		
2002	Protohingsa	"Moneri Akashe" (duet)	Tabun Sutradhar	Sadhana Sargam		
2002	Protohingsa	"Moneri Akashe" (male)	Tabun Sutradhar	solo		
2002	Tak Jhal Mishti	"Aaj Mone Hoy"(Male)	Tabun			
2002	Tak Jhal Mishti	"Aaj Mone Hoy"(Duet)	Tabun	Sadhana Sargam		
2002	Tak Jhal Mishti	"Tomar Preme"	Tabun			
2003	Adorini	"Nesha Nesha Ei Raate"		Sagarika Mukherjee		
2003	Moner Majhe Tumi	"Akash Chhoa"	Devendranath Chatterje	Sadhana Sargam		
2003	Raktha Bandhan	"Ei Cholari Pothe"	Anu Malik	Sadhana Sargam		
2003	Guru	"Olite Golite Jane Galo Naam (Ami Radha Tumi Shyam)"	Babul Bose	Shreya Ghoshal		
2003	Mayer Anchal	"Jite Gechi Re"	Ashok Bhadra	solo		
2003	Mayer Anchal	"Ami Ek Gayer Chele"	Ashok Bhadra	N/A		
2003	Tere Naam (Dubbed)	"Bolo Na"	Himesh Reshammiya	N/A		
2004	Aakrosh	"E Kalo Kalo Chokhe"		Kavita Krishnamurthy		
2004	Akritoggo	"Mone Ache Etodin"		Shreya Ghoshal		
2004	Coolie	"Prem Korar Manush"		Shreya Ghoshal		
2004	Shudhu Tumi	"Shure Shure Gaan Holo"	Zubeen Garg	Shashwati Phukan		
2004	Shudhu Tumi	"E Chokher Kachhete"	Zubeen Garg	Sagarika, Hilsa, Pritha Mazumdar		
2004	Surya	"Phoske Gele Emon Chhele"	S P Venkatesh	solo		
2004	Bandhan	"Shei Chilo Bori Anmona"	Jeet Gannguli			
2004	Gyarakal	Bojhona Tomay Ami"	Babul Bose	Shreya Ghoshal		
2004	Premi	"Eaki Sathe Eaki Pathe"	Jeet Ganguly	Zubeen Garg		
2004	Premi	"Pratham Preemer Pratham Choa"	Jeet Ganguly	Shreya Ghoshal		
2005	Baji	"Victoria Gachher Tolay"	Ashok Bhadra	N/A		
2005	Parinam	"Sundori Kholona"	Babul Bose	solo		
2005	Swapno	"O Akash Sona Sona"	Hemanta Mukherjee, Madhu Mukherjee	Babul Supriyo, Rima Mukherjee		
2005	Swapno	"Aaj Aamar Praner"	Madhu Mukherjee	Babul Supriyo, Sadhna Sargam		
2005	Dadar Adesh	"PremJiboner Asha"	Ashok Bhadra	Shreya Ghoshal		
2005	Raju Uncle	"Mon Mane Na"	Ashok Raj	Shreya Ghoshal		
2005	Tobu Bhalobashi	"Shudhu Bhalobasha Ekakar" (duet)	Snehashish Chakraborty	Shreya Ghoshal		
2005	Sathi Amar	"Ki Je Mushkil"	Ashok Raj			
2006	Eri Naam Prem	"Ei Prem"	Jeet Gannguli			
2006	Hero	"Mon Jake Khoje"	Jeet Gannguli			
2006	Hero	"Jibone Prothom Eto Kachhe"	Jeet Gannguli	Shreya Ghoshal		
2006	Priyotoma	"Ei Pathe Saath Chalo Na"	Jeet Gannguli	Sagarika, Shreya Ghoshal		
2006	Ghatak	"Mon Dole Dole Dole"	Jeet Gannguli	Mahalaxmi Iyer		
2006	Ghatak	"Ei Neel Sagarer Pare"	Jeet Gannguli	June Banerjee		
2006	Mayer Morjada	"Mone Mone Etodin Jaar Kotha"	Emon Saha	Shreya Ghoshal		
2006	Sathihara	"Kachhe Eso Aaro"	Babul Bose	Sneha Pant		
2006	The Bong Connection	"Majhi Re"	Neel Dutt			
2007	I Love You	"I Love You My Love"	Jeet Ganguly	Shreya Ghoshal		
2007	I Love You	"Bhalobasha Haat Baralo"	Jeet Ganguly	Shreya Ghoshal		
2007	Bidhatar Lekha	"Aaj Saradin Mosti Te"	Lalit Pandit	solo		
2007	Greptar	"Vandemataram"	Anupam Dutta	solo		
2007	Nabab Nandini	"Aaj Mon Harate"	Babul Bose	Alka Yagnik		
2007	Nabab Nandini	"Chupi Chupi Churi Kore"	Babul Bose	Alka Yagnik		
2007	Nabab Nandini	"Anupama Avilasha (O Roop Aamar Avilasha)"	Babul Bose	June Banerjee, Chorus		
2007	Nabab Nandini	"O Priyotoma (Kemon Aacho Bolo)"	Babul Bose	Alka Yagnik		
2007	Prem	"E Moner Chawa"	Ashok Bhadra	Kumar Sanu, Rimi Mukherjee		
2008	Amar Sangi	"Ei Buke Jolchhe Agun"	Babul Bose	June Banerjee		
2008	Bhalobasa Bhalobasa	"Boloto Loke Basle Bhalo"	S P Venkatesh, Devi Sri Prasad	solo		
2008	Bhalobasa Bhalobasa	"Halka Halka Melamesha"	S P Venkatesh, Devi Sri Prasad	solo		
2008	Bhalobasa Bhalobasa	"Ektu Lojja Chokhe"	S P Venkatesh, Devi Sri Prasad	Alka Yagnik		
2008	Biyer Lagna	"Ei Premeri Golpe"	Debendranath Chatterjee	Sadhana Sargam		
2008	Biyer Lagna	"Hoy Bhalobashte Dao"	Debendranath Chatterjee	solo		
2008	Mahakaal	"Jiboner Ei Poth"	Debjit Bera	Mahalaxmi Iyer		
2008	Mon Mane Na	"Chupi Chupi Bhalobasa"	Jeet Ganguly	Shreya Ghoshal		
2008	Mon Mane Na	"Chokhe Chokhe Ato"	Jeet Ganguly			
2008	Premer Kahini	"O My Love"	Jeet Ganguly			
2008	Premer Kahini	"Tumi chara"	Jeet Ganguly	Shreya Ghoshal		
2008	Premer Kahini	"Rimjhim Ei Dharate"	Jeet Ganguly			
2008	Premer Kahini	"Premer kahini"	Jeet Ganguly			
2008	Tomar Janya	"Dite Chai Tomay" (male)		solo		
2009	Aparadhi	"Premier Ghari"	Bappi Lahiri	Kavita Krishnamurthy		
2009	Aparadhi	Tomare Kajol Kore Chokhe Rakhbo"	Bappi Lahiri	Alka Yagnik		
2009	Brake Fail	"Jodi Proshno Koro"	Neel Dutt	Shreya Ghoshal		
2009	Brake Fail	"Shorey Shorey Jay"	Neel Dutt	Shreya Ghoshal		
2009	Challenge	"Dekhechi Tomake Srabone"	Jeet Ganguly	June Banerjee	Kano kichu kotha bolo nal	"Kano kichu kotha bolo na" title song " Jodi jhiri jhiri brishtike daki"
2009	Jackpot	"Jibone Ki Pabo Na"	Jeet Ganguly			
2009	Krodh	"Ringtine Dingtone"		Mahalaxmi Iyer		
2009	Maa Amar Maa	"Mon Jaane Na"	Ashok Raj	Alka Yagnik		
2009	Neel Akasher Chandni	"Saiyaan Saiyaan"	Jeet Ganguly			
2009	Neel Akasher Chandni	"Saiyaan Saiyaan" (Remix)	Jeet Ganguly			
2009	Neel Akasher Chandni	"Bhalobasha Swapno"	Jeet Ganguly	Mahalakshmi Iyer		
2009	Neel Akasher Chandni	"Ki Bhalo Lage Piya"	Jeet Ganguly	Ambarish, Mahalakshmi Iyer		
2009	Neel Akasher Chandni	"Boro Aasha Kore"	Jeet Ganguly	Mahalakshmi Iyer		
2009	Neel Akasher Chandni	"Chandni Chandni"	Jeet Ganguly			
2009	Neel Akasher Chandni	"Raat Jaye Raat Jaye"	Jeet Ganguly			
2009	Paran Jai Jaliya Re	"Mon Jaane"	Jeet Ganguly	June Banerjee		
2009	Rajdrohi	"Ek Jhotkay Babama Raji"	Babul Bose	Mahalaxmi Iyer		
2009	Saat Paake Bandha	"Ami Bonoful Go"				
2010	Dui Prithibi	"Bol Naa Aar"	Jeet Gannguli	Monali Thakur		
2010	Ekti Tarar Khonje	"Chole Jete Bohudure"	Chandhan Raychawdory	solo		
2010	Ekti Tarar Khonje	"Hariye Jay"	Chandhan Raychawdory	solo		
2010	Ekti Tarar Khonje	"Pagol Mon"(Male)	Chandhan Raychawdory	solo		
2010	Pratidwandi	"Le Pagli Le"	Ashok Bhadra	solo		
2010	Besh Korechi Prem Korechi	"Jibon Mane Sonar Horin"	Kumar Sanu	solo		
2010	Le Chakka	"You and Me"	Indradeep Dasgupta	June Banerjee		
2010	Le Chakka	"Ali Maula"	Indradeep Dasgupta	Shreya Ghoshal, Shahdab Hussain		
2010	Hangover	"Hangover" (Title Track)	Bappa Lahiri	Bappi Lahiri		
2010	Mon Amar Shudhu Tomar	"Je Hawa Chhuyeche Ama"		solo		
2010	Mon Amar Shudhu Tomar	"Mukhe Bolona"		solo		
2010	Mon Niye	"Tomari Chokhe"		Pritha		
2010	Rahmat Ali	"Sundori Sundori"	Bappi Lahiri	solo		
2010	Rahmat Ali	"Tumi Amar Ami Tomar"	Bappi Lahiri	Alka Yagnik, Bappi Lahiri		
2010	Wanted	"Neka Neka"	Rajesh Roy	Manjeera Ganguly		
2010	Josh	"Keu Mone Mone"	Jeet Gannguli	Monali Thakur, Pamela Jain		
2010	Target	"Sa Ni Pa Ni Ni"	Jeet Gannguli	Shreya Ghoshal		
2011	Mone Mone Bhalobasha	"Dada Paaye Pori"	Babul Bose	solo		
2011	Mone Mone Bhalobasha	"Mone Mone Bhalobasha"	Babul Bose	solo		
2011	Romeo	"Eta ki Bhul"	Jeet Ganguly	Monali Thakur		
2011	Faande Poriya Boga Kaande Re	"Sono Mishti Meye"	Jeet Ganguly	Akriti Kakkar		
2011	Faande Poriya Boga Kaande Re	"Akasher Nile" (Male version)	Jeet Ganguly			
2011	Faande Poriya Boga Kaande Re	"Akasher Nile" (Duet version)	Jeet Ganguly	Monali Thakur		
2011	Get 2 Gether	"Shono Cholti Pother Gaan"		Mahalaxmi Iyer		
2011	Bhorer Alo	"Give Me Freedom"		Monali Thakur		
2011	Chaplin	"Pata Jhora Brishti"		Kaushiki Chakraborty		
2011	Fighter	"Ke Se"	Indradeep Dasgupta	Monali Thakur		
2011	Piya Tumi	"Jodi Aajke"		June Banerjee		
2011	Punorutthan	"Digonto Nil"		June Banerjee		
2011	Punorutthan	"Ki Jani Ki Je Holo" (version 1)		Madhushree		
2011	Punorutthan	"Ki Jani Ki Je Holo" (version 2)		Shreya Ghoshal		
2011	Poriborton	"E Somoy Akashjure"	Sanjeev-Darshan	Sadhana Sargam, Sourin, Rimi		
2011	Poriborton	"Theme Jaak Somoy"	Sanjeev-Darshan	Sadhana Sargam		
2011	Poriborton	"Hariye Jawa Shopnogulo"	Sanjeev-Darshan	Alka Yagnik		
2011	Poriborton	"Tomari Cholar Pothe"	Sanjeev-Darshan	Alka Yagnik		
2011	Paapi	"Bhai K Shala Banao"	B. Shubhau			
2011	Tomay Bhalobashi	"Happy Birthday"		Monali Thakur		
2011	Tomay Bhalobashi	"Ore Road Romeo"		June Banerjee		
2012	8.08 Er Bongaon Local	"Roj Shokale"		solo		
2012	Bapi Bari Jaa	"Chaap Nis Na"	Jeet Gannguli	Monali Thakur		
2012	Bawali Unlimited	"Mon Ure Chole"	Dev Sen	Kunal Ganjawala, June Banerjee		
2012	Bawali Unlimited	"Strawberry"	Savvy Gupta	Rana Mazumdar		
2012	Bikram Singha: The Lion Is Back	"Guti Guti Paye"	Shree Pritam	Mahalakshmi Iyer		
2012	Bikram Singha: The Lion Is Back	Dhuan Dhuan"	Shree Pritam	Mahalakshmi Iyer		
2012	Doshomi	"Shopno Bheja Alo"		Rekha Bhardwaj		
2012	Ei Raat Tomar Amar	"Canvas Monalisa"		solo		
2012	Ei Raat Tomar Amar	"Sneorita Theme"		solo		
2012	Haatchhani	"Kivbhabe Sajabo Ogo Bolo"		solo		
2012	Idiot	"Sajna Paas Aa Tu Zara"		Mahalaxmi Iyer		
2012	Chaya Chobi	"Ditio Bhalobasha"	Arfin Rumey			
2012	Paanch Adhyay	"Agontuk"	Shantanu Moitra	Shreya Ghoshal		
2012	Phire Esho Tumi	"Amar Naam Bapi"		Sujoy Bhowmik		
2012	Premleela	"Keno Udaasi Batashe"		Rima Mukherjee		
2012	Passport (2012 film)	"Ghum Ghum Ratre"	Subhayu Bedajna		Pamela Jain	
2013	Amar Bodyguard	"Duru Duru Kaape"		June Banerjee		
2013	Amar Bodyguard	"Amar Boyfriend"		Manjira		
2013	Dekha Na Dekhay	"Dekha Na Dekhay"	Rabindranath Tagore	solo		
2013	Dekha Na Dekhay	"Ghorete Bhromor Elo"	Rabindranath Tagore	solo		
2013	Dekha Na Dekhay	"Ami Tomar Preme Hobo"	Rabindranath Tagore	solo		
2013	Dekha Na Dekhay	"Keteche Ekela"	Rabindranath Tagore	solo		
2013	Deewana	"Deewana"	Dev Sen	June Banerjee		
2013	Holud Pakhir Dana	"Aami Aami" (duet)		June Banerjee		
2013	Holud Pakhir Dana	"Holud Pakhir Danay"		solo		
2013	Khiladi	"O Humsafar"	Shree Pritam	Palak Muchhal		
2013	Khoka 420	"O Bondhu Amar"		Mahalaxmi Iyer		
2013	Loafer	"Cholo Prem Kori"		June Banerjee		
2013	Bhalobasha Zindabad	"Ekti Kobita Tomay Niye"	Shawkat Ali Emon			
2013	Rocky	"Tui Borsha Bikeler Dheu"	Jeet Gannguli	Palak Muchhal		
2013	Megh Roddur	"Ki Boli Na Booi"	Rishi Chanda	Somchanda Bhattacharya		
2013	Nishwashrtha Bhalobasa	"What Is Love"	Akash Sen	solo		
2013	Swabhoomi	"E Bachar Ladai"	Bappi Lahiri	solo		
2013	Swabhoomi	"Eschenno Jakhon Jetei Hobe"	Bappi Lahiri	Bappi Lahiri		
2013	Swabhoomi	"Shanti Shanti Shanti Gram"	Bappi Lahiri	Bappi Lahiri, June Banerjee		
2014	Shesh Bole Kichhu Nei	"Ekhanei"	Neel Dutt			
2014	Shesh Bole Kichhu Nei	"Swadhin"	Neel Dutt	Madhubanti Bagchi		
2014	Shesh Bole Kichhu Nei	"Tumi Chole Gele"	Neel Dutt			
2014	Shesh Bole Kichhu Nei	"Shesh Bole Kichhu Nei"	Neel Dutt			
2014	Kkoli: A Journey of Love	Jodi Chaao"	Meet Bros Anjjan	Shreya Ghoshal		
2014	Agnee	Bhalobashi Toke Je Tai"				
2014	Agnee	Shudhu Tui Shunbi"				
2014	Bangali Babu English Mem	Hawa Ra Chupi Chupi	Dabbu			
2014	Teen Patti	"Prem Hoy Ke Jeno"		solo		
2015	Besh Korechi Prem Korechi	"Besh Korechi Prem Korechi (Title Track)"	Jeet Gannguli	Akriti Kakkar		
2015	Black	"Halka Halka"	Dabbu	Anweshaa		
2015	Jamai Baran	"Jean Porbo"		June Banerjee		
2015	Love In Rajasthan	"Dhinka Tina"		solo		
2015	Pakaram	"Tor Chokhe Keno Jol"		solo		
2015	Premer Itikotha	"Tumi Tumi Nesha"		Jaya		
2016	Abhimaan	"Mon Bechara"	Suddho Roy	Shweta Pandit		
2016	Amar Prem	"Char Diner"		solo		
2016	Amar Prem	"Mon Deewana"		Ishani Nag		
2016	Don No. 1	"Don Don"		solo		
2016	Mental	Mon Najehal"		Sabrina Porshi		
2016	Niyoti	"Mon Haralo"	Savvy Gupta			
2016	Shikari	"Harabo Toke"	Indradeep Dasgupta			
2016	Aynabaji	Alu Piyaj er Kabbo"	Indradeep Dasgupta			
2016	Zulfiqar	"Katakuti Khela"	Anupam Roy	Shreya Ghoshal		
2017	Amar Aponjon	"Esho Amar Nodir Tire"	Dabbu	Antara Mitra		
2017	Comrade	"Mayabi Ei Hawa"		solo		
2017	Jawker Dhan	"Abhijaan"		solo		
2017	Love Via Friendship	"Aaj Ekla Mon"		Anwesha Dutta Guptan		
2017	Shrestha Bangali	"Jibon Ei Circus A"	Monty Sharma			
2017	The Bongs Again	"Hridmajharey Rakhbo"	Neel Dutt	Shreya Ghoshal, Anjan Dutt		
2018	Bhaijaan Elo Re	"Hati Hati Paye Paye"		Madhura Bhattacharya		
2018	Moner Majhe Tumi	"Phire Aar Asbe Ki"	Bappi Lahiri	Alka Yagnik		
2018	Moner Majhe Tumi	"Chal Nei Dhal Nei"	Bappi Lahiri	solo		
2018	Raja Rani Raji	"Jaa Hohe Dekha Jabe"	Lincoln	Mahalaxmi Iyer		
2018	Reunion	"Paharia Sur"		Iman Chakraborty		
2018	"Bengali Puja Song 2018"	"Joy Joy Durga Maa - The Pujo Song"	Jeet Gannguli	Abhijeet Bhattacharya, Jeet Gannguli		
2018	Tui Sudhu Amar	"Moner Kotha Bol"	Dolaan Mainnakk	Madhuraa Bhattacharya		
2018	Naqaab	"Hoye Aaye"	Dev Sen			
2018	Raja Rani Raji	"Ja Hobe Dekha"	Lincon	Mahalakshmi Iyer		
2018	Ami Neta Hobo	"Im in Love"	Ahamed Humaun	Monali Thakur		
2018	Jole Jongole	"Ei Mon"	Jeet Gannguli	Monali Thakur		
2018	Dotara	"Danay Jomeche Dhulo"	Shanku Mitra			
2019	Beporowa	"Khati Sona"	Dabbu	Kona		
2019	Nabajiban Bima Company	"Urte Diyechi 2"	Kumar Sanu	Alka Yagnik		
2019	Network	"Deewane Bole Daake"		Joyeeta Roy		
2019	Sanjhbati	"Bishorjon"	Anupam Roy			
2021	Magic	"E Naamey Se Naamey"	Dabbu	Anweshaa		
2022	Kakababur Protyaborton	"Nei Bhoy"	Indraadip Dasgupta			
2022	Kacher Manush	"Are Are Bondhu"	Nilayan Chatterjee	Amit Kumar		
2022	Mission Everest	"Tui Bharsha Diley"	Vijay Verma	Keka Ghoshal		
2022	Paka Dekha	"Tumi daak naam diley"	Jeet Ganguly	Monali Thakur		
2023	Dilkhush	"Tobu Onyo Kothao"	Nilayan Chatterjee	Antara Mitra		
2023	LSD: Laal Suitcase Ta Dekhechen?	"Taake Bolte Chaii"	Savvy			
2026	Vijaynagar'er Hirey	"Jeetey Jaabe Je Raja"	Indraadip Dasgupta			

== English songs ==
Year	Album	Song	Composer	Writer	Co-singer
1994	Stylebhai	"Heads over Heels"	Salim-Sulaiman	Edel Pereira	Stylebhai

== Telugu film songs ==
Year	Film	Song	Composer(s)	Writer(s)	Co-singer(s)
2001	6 Teens	"Bulli Bulli Yerrani"	Ghantadi Krishna		
2002	Manmadhudu	"Cheliya Cheliya"	Devi Sri Prasad	Sirivennela Sitarama Sastry	
2002	Sontham	"Eenati Varaku"	Devi Sri Prasad	Sirivennela Sitarama Sastry	Sumangali
2002	Yuva Rathna	"Needi 98480"	M. M. Keeravani		
2003	Ottu Ee Ammayi Evaro Teleedu	"Muddu Muddu Gumma"	Ghantadi Krishna		
2004	Aarya	"You Rock My World"	Devi Sri Prasad		
2004	Prema Nagar	"Bramha Manadesi"	Anu Malik		
2005	Monalisa (D)	"Monalisa"	Valisha-Sandeep		
2005	Orey Pandu	"Chinnaguntanu"	Anand Raj Anand		
2006	Chukkallo Chandrudu	"Everybody"	Chakri	Surendra Krishna	Simha, Siddharth
2006	Bhagyalakshmi Bumper Draw	"Bigi Kougililo"	Chakri	Bhaskarabhatla	Kousalya
2006	Pournami	"Koyo Koyo"	Devi Sri Prasad	Sirivennela Sitaramasastri	
2006	Raam	"Evmaindo Emito (Shock)"	Yuvan Shankar Raja	Chinni Charan	Suchitra
2006	Kokila	"Varsham Fame Trisha"	Madhukar		KK, Tippu
2007	Student	"Tolivalapu Virise Hrudayana"	Krishna		Shreya Ghoshal
2007	Ta Ra Rum Pum	"Hey Sona"	Vishal–Shekhar		Mahalakshmi Iyer
2007	Ta Ra Rum Pum	"Ta Ra Rum Pum"	Vishal–Shekhar		Mahalakshmi Iyer
2008	Bhale Dongalu	"Neethone Kalisi"	K. M. Radha Krishnan		
2008	Dasavathaaram (D)	"Oh Ho Sanam"	Himesh Reshammiya		
2008	Dasavathaaram (D)	"Oh Ho Sanam"(Remix)	Himesh Reshammiya		
2008	Velugu - The Light (Private Album)	"Dhrakshavallivi"	Dennis Doddigarla		
2008	Ennatiki (Private Album)	"Kadhaku Nidurinchu"	Vijay Karun		
2009	Raju Maharaju	"Kalalone Kalagantunna"(Version ll)	Chakri		
2009	Bank	"Naa Choopu"	Chinni Charan		
2010	Prema Pilusthondi	"Konchem Dammundaali"	Ghantadi Krishna		
2010	Yamudu	"Stole My Heart"	Devi Sri Prasad		
2010	Yamudu	"Stole My Heart"(Unplugged)	Devi Sri Prasad		
2010	Prema Khaidhi	"Mynaa Mynaa"	D. Imman		
2012	Naa Ishtam	"Nee Kannullo"	Chakri		
2012	Yeto Vellipoyindhi Manasu	"Yedhi Yedhi"	Ilaiyaraaja	Anantha Sreeram	Ramya NSK
2013	Doosukeltha	"Thandavamade Shivide"	Mani Sharma		
2014	Its My Life	"It's My Life"	S R Shankar		
2017	Lover Boy	"Love Boy Antuntaaru"	Ashirvad		
2021	Gamanam	"Chithrala Jagamidhi"	Ilaiyaraaja		
2022	Stand Up Rahul	"Shallow"	Sweekar Agasthi		
2023	Music School	"Anandam Panchuko"	Ilaiyaraaja	Rahman	

== Kannada film songs ==
Year	Film(s)	No.	Song	Composer(s)	Writer(s)	Co-singer(s)
2003	Hello	1	"Friendshippa"	Srishaila	Srichandru	
2003	Don	2	"Mehbooba Mehbooba"	Sadhu Kokila	K. Kalyan	Sowmya Raoh
2004	Maurya	3	"Amma Amma I Love You"	Gurukiran	S. Narayan	
2004	Rowdy Aliya	4	"Yamma Yamma"	Srishaila	Kaviraj	Anuradha Sriram
2004	Love	5	"Yeh Jambada"	Anu Malik	Hamsalekha	
2007	Hudugaata	6	"Yeno Onthara"	Jassie Gift		Shreya Ghoshal
2007	Amrutha Vaani	7	"Gelatana Gelatana"	M. P. Naidu		
2007	Chanda	8	"Savi Savi"	S. Narayan		
2008	Honganasu	9	"Honganasu"	Hamsalekha		
2008	Bindaas	10	Thara Thara Onthara	Gurukiran	Kaviraj	
2008	Gaja	11	"Lambuji"	V. Harikrishna	V. Nagendra Prasad	K. S. Chitra
2008	Payana	12	"Chandira Muduva"	V. Harikrishna		
2008	Baa Bega Chandamama	13	"O Preethiya"	Murali		
2009	Ninagaagi Kaadiruve	14	"Bahumaanavade"	Robin Gurung		
2009	Maleyali Jotheyali	15	"Shuruvagide Sundara"	V. Harikrishna		Shreya Ghoshal
2009	Kalakaar	16	"Olave Nenillade"	Giridhar Diwan		
2009	Parichaya	17	"Kudinotave Manamohaka"	Jassie Gift		Shreya Ghoshal
2009	Chellidaru Sampigeya	18	"Warrenta"	S. Narayan		
2009	Baaji	19	"Gaaliyali Kavanava"	G. R. Shankar		
2009	Maccha	20	"Neeli Neeli"	Arjun Janya		
2010	Bisile	21	"Naa Hadoke"	Gagan-Hari		Godlove
2010	Meshtru	22	"Hudugi Hudugi"	K. M. Indra		
2010	Preethi Nee Shashvathana	23	"Huttoku Munchene"	K. Kalyan		Harini
2010	Thamassu	24	"Nannane Naa"	Sandeep Chowta		Sowmya Raoh
2010	Sihigaali	25	"Ninna Nenedare"	B. R. Shankar		
2010	Jothegara	26	"Jotheyalli Nee Baro"	Sujeeth Shetty		
2011	Karthik	27	"Nee Thandiruve"	John V	Hrudaya Shiva	Shreya Ghoshal
2011	Dhan Dhana Dhan	28	"Dhan Dhana Dhan"	Sai Karthik		Anuradha Bhat
2011	Kool...Sakkath Hot Maga	29	"Neenu Ninthare"	V. Harikrishna		
2011	Prema Chandrama	30	"Elindalo Ondu"	V. Harikrishna		
2011	Dandam Dashagunam	31	"Kalli Neenu"	V. Harikrishna		
2011	Prince	32	"Khushiyalli"	V. Harikrishna	Jayanth Kaikini	
2011	Shyloo	33	"O Jeevave (Duet Version)"	Jassie Gift	Kaviraj	Shreya Ghoshal
2012	Munjane	34	"Anthu Inthu"	S. Narayan		Shweta Pandit, Sakthisree Gopalan
2012	Parie	35	"Mirugutide Yedeyolage"	Veer Samarth	Sudhir Attavar	Gayatri Iyer
2013	Ale	36	"Ale Ale"	Mano Murthy		
2013	Jinke Mari	37	"Eenagide"	Sai Karthik		
2013	Shravani Subramanya	38	"Kannalle Kannittu"	V. Harikrishna	V. Nagendra Prasad	
2014	Maanikya	39	"Jeena Jeena Ya"	Arjun Janya	V. Nagendra Prasad	
2014	Rangan Style	40	"Punaha Punaha"	Gurukiran		Shreya Ghoshal
2015	The Plan	41	"Hogide Jaari"	Richard	Ranjith B. L.	
2015	Abhinetri	42	"Tamnam Tamnam"	Mano Murthy	Chi. Udaya Shankar	Shreya Ghoshal
2016	Crazy Boy	43	"Vinanthi Maadalilla"	Jassie Gift	V. Nagendra Prasad	Shreya Ghoshal
2017	Hebbuli	44	"Usire Usire"	Arjun Janya	Kaviraj	Shreya Ghoshal
2017	Naa Panta Kano	45	"Tunturu"	S. Narayan		Shreya Ghoshal
2025	Gajarama	46	"Ella Helabekide"	Mano Murthy	Jayant Kaikini	Shreya Ghoshal

== Marathi film songs ==
Year(s)	Film(s)	No.	Song(s)	Composer(s)	Writer(s)	Co-singer(s)	Ref.
2004	Juilee	1	"Mi Toch Toch"	Kishor Parashar, Milind Ingle	Prasad Kulkarni	Sanjeevani	
2008	Baap Re Baap Dokyala Taap	2	"Your Place Or Mine"	Nitin Nivarkar	Arvind Jagtap	Solo	
2008	Mi Amruta Boltey	3	"Aaja Jane Jana"	Dinkar Shirke		Solo	
2009	Sumbaran	4	"Dongarachya Potamadhe"	Rahul Ranade	Gajendra Ahire	Janhvi Prabhu Arora	
2009	Sumbaran	5	"Rutu Yetil Jatil"	Rahul Ranade	Gajendra Ahire	Janhvi Prabhu Arora	
2012	Satrangi Re	6	"Satrangi Re"	Ajay Naik		Mahesh Kale, Jasraj Joshi	
2012	Satrangi Re	7	"Yaari Tujhi"	Ajay Naik		Sumitra Iyer, Jasraj Joshi	
2012	Satrangi Re	8	"Rock The Dance Floor"	Ajay Naik		Mahesh Kale, Jasraj Joshi	
2013	Lagna Pahave Karun	9	"Jaanta Ajanta"	Ajay Naik	Ajay Naik	Solo	
2014	Madhyamvarg: The Middle Class	10	"Nashibacha Khel"	Gunvant Sen	Babasaheb Saudagar	Priya Bhattacharya	
2014	Avatarachi Goshta	11	"Namo Namah"	Gandhaar	Sunil Sukthankar		
2016	Ek Hoti Rani	12	"Yeh Zindagi"	Salil Amrute	Ashwini Shende		
2016	Reti	13	"Ninutva"	Superbia	Sanjay Krishnaji Patil	Nihira Joshi	
2016	Reti	14	"Reti Theme Song"	Superbia	Sanjay Krishnaji Patil		
2017	Shentimental	15	"Tujhyamule"			Nihira Joshi	
2018	Bucket List	16	"Houn Jau Dya"	Rohan - Rohan		Shreya Ghoshal, Sadhana Sargam	
2018	Hostel Days	17	"Duniya Rang Rangili"	Ajay Naik			
2023	I Prem U	18	"Halu Halu"	Sanju-Sangram			
2025	Banjara	19	"Houya Recharge"	Avadhoot Gupte	Guru Thakur	Avadhoot Gupte	
2025	Banjara	20	"Jarase thambun mage pahave"	Avadhoot Gupte	Guru Thakur	Avadhoot Gupte	
2026	Cup Bashi	21	"Reshim Reshim"	Uttam Singh	Guru Thakur	Bela Shende	

== Tamil film songs ==
Year(s)	Film(s)	Song(s)	Composer(s)	Writer(s)	Co-singer(s)	Ref.
2001	Vaanchinathan	"Amul Baby"	Karthik Raja	Snehan	Sujatha	
2001	Samrat Asoka	"Adiye Aathi"	Anu Malik	Thamarai	Kavita Krishnamurthy	
2005	Mumbai Xpress	"Yele Nee Etti"	Ilaiyaraaja	Vaali	Kamal Haasan, Sunidhi Chauhan, Sonu Nigam, Shreya Ghoshal	
2005	Sandakozhi	"Ennamo Nadakurathe"	Yuvan Shankar Raja	Na. Muthukumar		
2007	Aalwar	"Anbulla Kadhali"	Srikanth Deva	Kabilan	Khushbu	
2008	Sandai	"October Maadhathil"	Dhina		Rita Thyagarajan	
2009	Modhi Vilayadu	Ottrai Vaarthayil"	Colonial Cousins			
2009	Maasilamani	Oh Divya	D. Imman	P. Vijay		
2010	Mynaa	"Mynaa Mynaa"	D. Imman	Yugabharathi	M. L. R. Karthikeyan	
2010	Singam	"She Stole My Heart"	Devi Sri Prasad	Viveka	Megha	
2010	Kacheri Arambam	"Vithai Vithai"	D. Imman	Na. Muthukumar		
2022	Clap	"Konjam Chellama"	Ilaiyaraja			
2023	Music School	"Aanatham Peruguthe"	Ilaiyaraaja	PA Vijay		

== Malayalam film songs ==
Year(s)	Film(s)	No.	Song(s)	Composer(s)	Writer(s)	Co-singer(s)	Ref.
2014	London Bridge	1	"Ennum Ninne Orkkanai Ullil"	Sreevalsan Menon			
2015	Samrajyam II: Son of Alexander	2	"Iruttinte Pootanai"	R. A. Shafeer			

== Other language film songs ==
=== Bhojpuri songs ===
Year(s)	Film(s)	Song(s)	Composer(s)	Writer(s)	Co-singer(s)
2011	Dushmani	"Chunri Odhele Piya"	Pyarelal Yadav	Durga Natraj	Pamela Jain

=== Maithili songs ===
Year(s)	Film(s)	Song(s)	Composer(s)	Writer(s)	Co-singer(s)
2014	Half Murder	"Kahiya Tak Ahina"	Sunil Pawan		solo

=== Punjabi songs ===
Year(s)	Film(s)	Song(s)	Composer(s)	Writer(s)	Co-singer(s)
2012	Rahe Chardi Kala Punjab Di	"Gidhe Vich Gedha Laja"	Surinder Bachan		Jaspinder Narula

=== Odia film songs ===
Year(s)	Film(s)	Song(s)	Composer(s)	Writer(s)	Co-singer(s)	Ref.
2010	Tora Mora Jodi Sundara	"Tu Chunie Delu"			Sunidhi Chauhan	
2010	Tora Mora Jodi Sundara	"Sakala Suraja Aji Deichi"			Ira Mohanty	
2012	Kebe Tume Nahan Kebe Mu Nahin	"Baki Achhi Aau Kichhi"	Bikash Das	Mohit Chakraborty		
2013	Deewana Deewani	"Rakhichi Nei Tote Chatire"	Prasant Padhi			
2016	Sweet Heart	"Malli Naa Tu Chameli"			solo	

=== Sindhi songs ===
Year(s)	Film(s)	Song(s)	Composer(s)	Writer(s)	Co-singer(s)	Ref.
2007	Pyar Kare Dis: Feel the Power of Love	"Khushiya Dekho"	Ghansham Vaswani			

=== Gujarati songs ===
Year(s)	Film(s)	Song(s)	Composer(s)	Writer(s)	Co-singer(s)
2005	Love Is Blind	Manma Mara Manma			Shreya Ghoshal
2005	Love Is Blind	Bandh Ankho Ma			Shreya Ghoshal
2017	Aav Taru Kari Nakhu	Aav Taru Kari Nakhu	Kedar Bhagat		
2017	Aav Taru Kari Nakhu	Silky Silky Ankho Ma	Piyush Kanojia		June Banerjee
2017	Aav Taru Kari Nakhu	Bhini Bhini Raat Maa	Kedar Bhagat & Piyush Kanojia		Manjeera Ganguly
2017	Pappa Tamne Nahi Samjaay	Sattak	Piyush Kanojia	Niren Bhatt	
2017	Pappa Tamne Nahi Samjaay	Chuski	Piyush Kanojia	Niren Bhatt	
2017	Pappa Tamne Nahi Samjaay	Sorry Pappa	Piyush Kanojia	Niren Bhatt	
2018	Tari Maate Once More	Bin Tere"	Hiren Bhojak		
2018	Tari Maate Once More	"Mango Tango"	Hiren Bhojak		
2018	Tension Thai Gayu	Haiyathi Haiyu Male	Bandish Vaz		Pragya Patra
2018	Family Circus	Prem Rang	Hemang Dholakia	Krupesh Thacker	
2023	Hu-Atra Tatra Sarvatra	Tane Samjhu Chhu	Teenu Arora	Irshad Dalal	Ramya Iyer
2023	Congratulations	Bekhabar	Kedar-Barghav	Barghav Purohit	Manasi Parekh

=== Urdu songs ===
Year(s)	Film(s)	Song(s)	Composer(s)	Writer(s)	Co-singer(s)	Ref.
2011	Love Mein Ghum	"Jaadu Bhari"	M. Arshad, Ravi Bal, Najat Ali, Waqar Ali, Huntar, Arshad Mehmood		M. Arshad	
2013	Dil Mera Dharkan Teri	"Kiya Hai Jo Pyar"	Master Inayat Hussain			
2013	Armaan	"Ko Ko Korina"	Sohail Rana		Farrukh Abid & Shoaib Farrukh	
2013	Armaan	Jab Piyar Main Do Dil	Sohail Rana		Farrukh Abid & Shoaib Farrukh	
2013	Aina	"Kabhi Mein Sochta Hoon"	Robin Ghosh			
2013	Aina	"Ruthey Ho Tum"	Robin Ghosh		Sunidhi Chauhan	
2016	Sawal 700 Crore Dollar Ka	"Aaja Sajan Aaja"	Faizi Ali		Alka Yagnik	
2016	Sawal 700 Crore Dollar Ka	"Dhun Dhuna Dhun"	Faizi Ali		Afshan Fawad	

== Other language non-film songs ==
Year	Album	Song(s)	Composer	Writer	Co-singer(s)	Notes	Ref(s)
1977		"A Te Apple Kheye"	Manas Mukherjee		Solo	His very first song recorded when he was 5 years old.	
1990	Wham Bam	"Mele Wich Ayee"	Bally Sagoo	Shaan	—N/a	Punjabi Remix Song	
1991	Star Crazy	"Nakhro De Nakhre"	Bally Sagoo	Shaan	—N/a		
1992	Alive and Kicking	"Dhol Vajda"	Shaan		Solo	Third album released. His first album released in Comapct Disc Digital Audio Format.	
1992	Alive and Kicking	"Mele Wich"	Shaan		Solo	Third album released. His first album released in Comapct Disc Digital Audio Format.	
1992	Alive and Kicking	"Puttar Nishani"	Shaan		Solo	Third album released. His first album released in Comapct Disc Digital Audio Format.	
1992	Alive and Kicking	"The Kicking Mix"	Shaan		Solo	Third album released. His first album released in Comapct Disc Digital Audio Format.	
1992	Alive and Kicking	"Bhangra Punjabian Da"	Shaan		Solo	Third album released. His first album released in Comapct Disc Digital Audio Format.	
1992	Alive and Kicking	"Maar Chharapa"	Shaan		Solo	Third album released. His first album released in Comapct Disc Digital Audio Format.	
1992	Alive and Kicking	"Hi Hi Preeto" (Remix)	Shaan		Solo	Third album released. His first album released in Comapct Disc Digital Audio Format.	
1992	Alive and Kicking	"Khari Hoke Gal Sun Na"	Shaan		Solo	Third album released. His first album released in Comapct Disc Digital Audio Format.	
1993	Keep on Moving	"Nee Main Kamliee Aan"	Shaan		Solo		
1993	Keep on Moving	"Jadu"	Shaan		Solo		
1993	Keep on Moving	"Club Mix"	Shaan		Solo		
1993	Keep on Moving	"Boliyaan"	Shaan		Solo		
1993	Keep on Moving	"Kehre Picho Wicho Ayee"	Shaan		Solo		
1993	Keep on Moving	"Live Your Life"	Shaan		Solo		
2018	Notes from a Peculiar Time in Space	"I woke up with this noise in my head telling me that it's time"	Shaan		Solo	Ambient album	
2018	Notes from a Peculiar Time in Space	"Then There Was Water and I Started Remembering How to Sing Through the Waves"	Shaan		Solo	Ambient album	
2018	Notes from a Peculiar Time in Space	"And Then Came the Ground and Air Where You Are Able to Jump and Fly"	Shaan		Solo	Ambient album	
2018	Notes from a Peculiar Time in Space	"And Dance"	Shaan		Solo	Ambient album	
2018	Notes from a Peculiar Time in Space	"I'm Geeting Used to the Atmosphere While Cruising Around My Path"	Shaan		Solo	Ambient album	
2018	Notes from a Peculiar Time in Space	"This Earthy Dance Can Become Intense"	Shaan		Solo	Ambient album	
2018	Notes from a Peculiar Time in Space	"And It Will Trigger Some Unknown Sense"	Shaan		Solo	Ambient album	
2018	Notes from a Peculiar Time in Space	"But It Can Lead You Towards the Portal"	Shaan		Solo	Ambient album	
2018	Notes from a Peculiar Time in Space	"Through Which The Silent Part Takes Place"	Shaan		Solo	Ambient album	

== Replaced Film Songs ==
Year	Film	Song	Composer	Writer	Replaced by	Ref.
2010	Dabangg	Munni Badnaam Hui	Lalit Pandit	Lalit Pandit	Aishwarya Nigam	
2011	Bodyguard	I Love You	Pritam Chakraborty	Neelesh Misra	Ash King	
2014	Kick	Jumme Ki Raat	Himesh Reshammiya	Kumaar, Shabbir Ahmed	Mika Singh	
2019	Dabangg 3	Yu Karke	Sajid–Wajid	Danish Sabri	Salman Khan	
2025	Sitaare Zameen Par	"Shubh Mangalam"	Shankar-Ehsaan-Loy	Amitabh Bhattacharya	Shankar Mahadevan	

== See also ==
- Shaan discography
