= Shaadi Karke Phas Gaya Yaar =

2006 film by K.S. Adhiyaman

- Poster
- Directed by: K. S. Adhiyaman
- Written by: Rumi Jaffery (screenplay, dialogues)
- Story by: K. S. Adhiyaman
- Produced by: Bubby Kent
- Starring: Salman Khan; Shilpa Shetty
- Cinematography: W.B. Rao
- Edited by: D. B. Mallik
- Music by: Songs: Sajid–Wajid; Daboo Malik; Sameer Phaterpekar; Background Score: Sameer Phaterpekar
- Production company: Karishma International
- Distributed by: Eros International
- Release date: 4 August 2006
- Running time: 152 minutes
- Country: India
- Language: Hindi
- Budget: ₹11 crore
- Box office: ₹5.02 crore

Shaadi Karke Phas Gaya Yaar (transl. I'm screwed by getting married) is a 2006 Indian Hindi-language romantic comedy film directed by K. S. Adhiyaman. Salman Khan and Shilpa Shetty star in the roles of husband and wife. Reema Lagoo, Mohnish Behl, Aasif Sheikh, and Shakti Kapoor also star. It was remade in Tamil as Priyasakhi starring Madhavan and Sadha. The delay of the film meant that Priyasakhi ended up releasing first.

Shooting took place in London, United Kingdom and in India. The film was produced by Bubby Kent and was earlier titled Dil Chura Ke Chal Diye. The film was released in 2006 after being delayed in production for several years. The film proved to be unsuccessful and flopped at the box office.

== Synopsis ==
Ayaan, an eligible bachelor, lives a very wealthy lifestyle with his married brother, Karan, and his wife, Anju, his younger sister, Avni, and brother, Rahul, his mom, and his grandma. He runs a garage with his best friend Bunty, who helps him find love. One day, he meets the beautiful model, Ahana Kapoor, and falls head over heels in love with her. She forgets her personal diary in his garage. Bunty gives him an idea to read Ahana's diary and impress her. Through this, Ayaan woos her, wins her heart, and they get married.

Ahana soon finds out that despite Ayaan's wealth, his family is very conservative and tradition-bound. This causes some bitterness between the newlyweds, which gets worse when she becomes pregnant and wants to abort the child. While visiting her mom on their dog's birthday, Ahana has an accident, which results in a miscarriage. Ayaan blames her for losing the child, but his mother convinces him, and he apologizes.

Two months later, on Ahana's birthday, she finds out that Ayaan had tricked her through her diary. Ahana decides to get drunk on her birthday and expose Ayaan publicly. Ayaan slaps Ahana very hard for her behavior, after which she leaves the house. Ahana is once again pregnant, and Ayaan goes to court to make sure that Ahana doesn't abort the baby. With the court's permission, Ayaan lives with Ahana at her parents' house to ensure a safe pregnancy.

Ahana gives birth, and Ayaan proceeds to take their newborn baby home, leaving Ahana in the hospital. The doctor urges that the baby stay with the mother for a few months in order for Ahana to feed the baby. During this time, Ahana becomes attached to her baby and doesn't want to leave her marital family anymore. However, Ayaan wants nothing to do with Ahana and kicks her out of the house. Finally, Ayaan realizes his love and Ahana's mistake, and the movie ends with them planning for another baby.

== Cast ==
- Salman Khan as Ayaan Puri
- Shilpa Shetty as Ahana Puri/Kapoor
- Reema Lagoo as Isha Puri, Ayaan's mother
- Amneek Sandhu as Avni Puri, Ayaan's sister
- Mohnish Behl as Karan Puri / Police Constable Harvinder Singh Harvi
- Shakti Kapoor as Mr. Kapoor
- Supriya Karnik as Pammi, Ahana's mother
- Aasif Sheikh as Bunty / Inspector Sukhwinder Singh Sukhi: Ayan's best friend
- Neena Kulkarni as Lata, Ayaan's grandmother
- Kunika Lal as Rammi
- Shoma Anand as a Judge Asha
- Sudha Chandran as Doctor Sunita
- Jeetu Verma as College Student Sajid

== Production ==
After previously directed the film Hum Tumhare Haine Sanam, Adhiyaman began making a project titled Mujhse Shaadi Karogi in 2002, a romantic drama featuring Salman Khan and Shilpa Shetty in the lead roles. The project's title was changed to Dil Chura Ke Chal Diye and then to the eventual title Shaadi Karke Phas Gaya Yaar. The film was completed within a year, though the producers delayed the film's release indefinitely. Delays meant that Adhiyaman chose to remake the film and release it swiftly in Tamil as Priyasakhi with a new cast, while he was still waiting for the Hindi film to have a theatrical release.

== Soundtrack ==
Shaadi Karke Phas Gaya Yaar

Soundtrack album by Sajid–Wajid
- Released: 23 September 2006
- Genre: Feature film soundtrack
- Label: Tips
- Producer: Sajid–Wajid

Sajid–Wajid chronology
The Killer (2006)	Shaadi Karke Phas Gaya Yaar (2006)	Jaane Hoga Kya (2006)

#	Title	Singer(s)	Length	Music director(s)	Lyricist(s)
1	Dil Yeh Bahalta Nahin	Sonu Nigam, Sunidhi Chauhan	04:47	Daboo Malik	Salim Bijnori
2	Deewane Dil Ko Jaane Na	Alka Yagnik, Sonu Nigam, Sunidhi Chauhan	04:16	Sajid–Wajid	Shabbir Ahmed
3	Taaron Ko Mohabbat Amber Se	Alka Yagnik, Udit Narayan	04:42	Daboo Malik	Jalees Sherwani, Rashid Lucknowi
4	Shadi Kar Ke	Abhijeet Bhattacharya	02:00	P. Sameer	Manohar Iyer
5	Tujh Se	Sunidhi Chauhan	05:06	Daboo Malik	Salim Bijnori
6	Shaadi Kar Ke Phas Gaya Yaar	Sonu Nigam, Sunidhi Chauhan	05:11	Sajid–Wajid	Jalees Sherwani
7	Kuch Bhi Nahi Tha	Hariharan, Alka Yagnik	05:11	Sajid–Wajid	Jalees Sherwani

== Critical response ==
Taran Adarsh of IndiaFM gave the film 1 out of 5, writing "Salman looks as if he has just walked out of the Rajshri set. His depiction of Mr. Goody Goody reminds you of his part in H.A.H.K. and HUM SAATH-SAATH HAIN. Shilpa's role has negative shades and she plays the wicked wife well. The film has a number of actors in supporting roles, but the ones who stand out are Supriya Karnik [first-rate] and Shakti Kapoor [effective]. Reema Lagoo is too repetitive. Mohnish Bahl gets no scope. Kunika and Aasif Sheikh are passable.On the whole, SHAADI KARKE PHAS GAYA YAAR is a stale and outdated fare which reminds the viewer of the cinema of 1980s." Priyanka Jain of Rediff.com gave the film 1 out of 5, writing "The dialogues and screenplay by Rumi Jaffrey are amateurish. Music directors Sajid-Wajid also left the director to his own resources. There is not one foot-tapping number. The costumes are hopelessly out of fashion and look quite ugly. Overall, the look and feel of the film is not very pleasant. Garish colour combinations dominate, hurting the eye. You wait from beginning to end, hoping for at least one good scene. You get nothing."
