= Dabangg 2 (soundtrack) =

Soundtrack album by Sajid–Wajid
- Released: 9 November 2012
- Genre: Feature film soundtrack
- Language: Hindi
- Label: T-Series

Sajid–Wajid chronology
Son of Sardaar (2012)	Dabangg 2 (2012)	Rangrezz (2013)

Dabangg 2 (transl. Fearless 2) is the soundtrack to the 2012 film of the same name. Directed by Arbaaz Khan, the film is produced by himself and Malaika Arora under Arbaaz Khan Productions and Stellar Films. Khan's elder brother Salman Khan starred in the lead role.

The soundtrack album featured eight songs. The songs are composed by Sajid–Wajid while the lyrics were written by Jalees Sherwani, Irfan Kamal, and Sameer Anjaan. The full soundtrack album was released on 9 November 2012.

== Production ==
"This soundtrack is more current and has a lot more aggression. Some of the songs feature hilarious lyrics and we're sure people will like them."

- In an interview with Hindustan Times, composer Sajid Khan on the album.

The duo Sajid–Wajid composed the songs while the lyrics were written by Jalees Sherwani, Irfan Kamal, and Sameer Anjaan. Sajid Khan said that they started planning the sequel's music while they working on Dabangg. So they recruited most of the singers from the predecessor.

"Pandeyji Seeti" appears to be inspired by the song "Chalat Musafir" from the film Teesri Kasam (1966), which in turn was inspired by a Bihari folk song, and added little sample of previous song "Munni Badnaam Hui", which this song "Pandeyji Seeti", became sequel of this song In turn, "Pandeyji Seeti" itself appears to have inspired the song "Badri Ki Dulhania" in the film Badrinath Ki Dulhania (2017). The song "Fevicol Se" was sung by same singer Mamta Sharma.

== Track listing ==
No.	Title	Lyrics	Singer(s)	Length
1.	"Dagabaaz Re"	Sameer Anjaan	Rahat Fateh Ali Khan, Shreya Ghoshal, Shadaab Faridi	4:47
2.	"PandeyJee Seeti"	Sajid-Wajid, Ashraf Ali	Mamta Sharma, Wajid, Shreya Ghoshal	3:38
3.	"Fevicol Se"	Sajid–Wajid, Ashraf Ali	Wajid, Mamta Sharma	4:49
4.	"Saanson Ne"	Irfan Kamal	Sonu Nigam, Tulsi Kumar	4:49
5.	"Dabangg Reloaded"	Jalees Sherwani	Sukhwinder Singh	4.05
6.	"PandeyJee Seeti" (Remix)	Jalees Sherwani	Mamta Sharma, Wajid, Shreya Ghoshal	4:29
7.	"Fevicol Se" (Remix)	Sajid-Wajid, Ashraf Ali	Mamta Sharma, Wajid	4:17
8.	"Dabangg Reloaded" (Remix)	Irfan Kamal	Sukhwinder Singh	4:04

== Reception ==
Joginder Tuteja of Bollywood Hungama rated the music with 4/5 stars. Jaspreet Pandohar of BBC wrote "As bold and brash as its original, Dabangg 2's mammoth sound secures both Khan and Sajid-Wajid's place as premier hit makers in modern Bollywood history." A critic of Filmfare wrote "In a bid to assure that the film becomes a hit, the composers have done injustice to their music. If only they were more Dabangg."

Anand Vaishnav of India Times wrote "Dabangg 2’s music has been composed, keeping in mind the setting and theme of the film. And there are more than obvious references to the prequel’s blockbuster soundtrack. But that unfortunately is also its biggest undoing. Even from a mass-appeal point of view, the score offers no surprises and despite some genuinely-catchy tunes like Fevicol Re and Saanson Ne, the overall result is a tad underwhelming. Sajid-Wajid may have stuck to the brief and followed a successful template, but in the bargain, they end up getting trapped in a loop of predictability. Salman Khan's star-power will ensure decent success for most of the tracks - But for an album from the Dabangg franchise, the score is far from fearless, and plays it a little too safe."

== Accolades ==
Distributor	Date aired	Category	Recipient	Result	Ref.
Screen Awards	12 January 2013	Best Music	Sajid-Wajid	Nominated	
Screen Awards	12 January 2013	Best Playback Singer (Female)	Mamta Sharma ("Fevicol", Dabangg 2)	Nominated	
Screen Awards	12 January 2013	Best Lyrics	Sameer Anjaan ("Dagabaaz re", Dabangg 2)	Nominated	
Screen Awards	12 January 2013	Best Choreography	Chinni Prakash ("Pandeyji seeti bajaaye", Dabangg 2); Farah Khan ("Fevicol", Dabangg 2)	Nominated	
Mirchi Music Awards	3 March 2013	Song of The Year	"Dagabaaz Re"	Nominated	
Mirchi Music Awards	3 March 2013	Lyricist of The Year	Sameer Anjaan ("Dagabaaz Re")	Nominated	
Mirchi Music Awards	3 March 2013	Raag-Inspired Song of the Year	"Dagabaaz Re"	Nominated	
