= Sajid–Wajid =

Indian film music composers, 1998–2020

- Origin: Saharanpur, Uttar Pradesh, India
- Genres: Sufi, Bollywood
- Occupation: Music director
- Years active: 1998–May 2020 (as duo); June 2020-present Sajid Khan (as solo artist)

Sajid–Wajid was an Indian Bollywood Hindi film music director duo consisting of brothers Sajid Khan and Wajid Khan, the sons of Sharafat Ali Khan, a tabla player. Wajid Khan, the younger of the two brothers, died on June 1, 2020.

== Members ==
Sajid Ali Khan is the elder son of tabla player Ustad Sharafat Ali Khan and his wife, Razina Khan. He is married to Lubna Khan.

Sajid studied at the Academy of Asiatic Cinema and Television. His maternal grandfather was Ustad Faiyyaz Ahmed Khan, a Padma Shri awardee.

Wajid Ali Khan was the younger son of artist and tabla player Sharafat Ali Khan and Razina Khan. He joined his elder brother Sajid Khan to form the artistic duo Sajid–Wajid.

Wajid studied at Mithibai College where he met his college sweetheart Kamalrukh. The two dated for almost 10 years while Wajid was heavily involved in tours and in the musical formation. Family restrictions also postponed the marriage as Kamalrukh Khan, of Zoroastrian (Parsi) faith, refused to convert to Wajid's Sunni Muslim faith. Eventually, they married each other under the Special Marriages Act that allowed her to keep her religion and marry without conversion despite the opposition of Wajid's family. The couple had two children, Arshi, a daughter (born c. 2004) and Hrehaan, a son (born c. 2011).

In 2014, Wajid filed separation papers because of continuing religious and parental pressure but the couple never divorced. Kamalrukh did not receive alimony since the case was pending in court when Wajid died. Their children, however, received maintenance amounts from their father while he was alive pendente lite as per the Court's Order, according to Kamalrukh's interview with Sri Iyer of PGuris, where she also discusses how his family has usurped his property, not leaving anything for their children. Kamalrukh continues working as a clinical hypnotherapist and wellness coach. She also writes a regular fortnightly column for the Hindustan Times titled "Weekend Fix for the Soul".

== Career ==
Sajid–Wajid first scored music for Salman Khan's Pyar Kiya To Darna Kya in 1998. In 1999, they scored music for Sonu Nigam's album Deewaana. They composed music for several films further. The music duo has also composed music for several films starring Salman Khan. They were mentors on the reality shows Sa Re Ga Ma Pa Singing Superstar, Sa Re Ga Ma Pa Hindi 2012 and they composed the title track for the television reality shows Bigg Boss 4 and Bigg Boss 6. Sajid–Wajid also composed the IPL 4 theme song "Dhoom Dhoom Dhoom Dhadaka", with Wajid singing the title track.

== Sajid–Wajid as music directors ==
Denotes films that have not yet been released

Year(s)	Film(s)	Song(s)	Notes(s)
1998	Pyar Kiya To Darna Kya	One song- Teri Jawani	Along With Jatin–Lalit, Himesh Reshammiya
1999	Hello Brother	Four song- Area Ka Hero, Hata Sawan Ki Ghata, Chupke Se Koi, Hello Brother	Along With Himesh Reshammiya
2000	Papa The Great	Two songs	Along With Nikhil–Vinay, M. M. Keeravani and Naresh Sharma
2000	Baaghi		Along With Dilip Sen-Sameer Sen
2000	Khauff	One song- Raja Ki Qaid Mein	Along With Anu Malik
2001	Yeh Zindagi Ka Safar		Along With Daboo Malik
2001	Mitti		Along With Ali-Gani, Monty
2002	Gunaah	Three Songs	Along With Anand Raj Anand
2002	Shararat	All Songs	
2002	Hum Tumhare Hain Sanam	One song- Dil Tod Aaya	Along With Nadeem-Shravan, Nikhil-Vinay, Daboo Malik, Bappi Lahiri, Bali Brahmabhatt
2002	Kya Yehi Pyaar Hai	All Songs	
2002	Tumko Na Bhool Paayenge	Five songs- Yeh Bekhudi Deewangi, Mubarak Eid Mubarak, Kyon Khanke Teri Choodi, Main To Ladki Kunwari, Kyon Khanke Teri Choodi (Club Mix)	Along With Daboo Malik
2002	Maa Tujhhe Salaam	All Songs	
2003	Tere Naam	Two songs- Tune Saath Jo Mera Chhoda, Tune Saath Jo Mera Chhoda (Sad)	Along With Himesh Reshammiya
2003	Chori Chori	All Songs	
2004	Mujhse Shaadi Karogi	Seven songs- Rab Kare, Mujhse Shaadi Karogi, Aaja Soniye, Lahoo Banke Aansoon, Kar Doon Kamaal, Laal Dupatta, Aaja Soniye (Remix)	Along With Anu Malik
2004	Garv	Five songs - Hum Tumko Nigahon Mein, Dum Mast Mast, Soniye Toh Sonee, Fariyaad Kya Kare Ham, Tere Hai Deewana Dil	Along With Anu Malik
2005	Mashooka		
2005	Dreams		
2006	Jaane Hoga Kya	Two Songs	Along With Nikhil-Vinay
2006	Shaadi Karke Phas Gaya Yaar	Three songs- Deewane Dil Ko Jaane Na, Shaadi Kar Ke Phas Gaya Yaar, Kuch Bhi Nahi Tha	Along With Daboo Malik, P. Sameer
2006	The Killer	All Songs	
2006	Jawani Diwani	All Songs	
2006	Saawan... The Love Season	Two songs- Tu Mila De, Mere Dil Ko Dil Ki Dhadkan Ko	Along With Aadesh Shrivastav
2007	Welcome	One song - title track Background Score	Along With Anand Raj Anand, & Himesh Reshammiya
2007	Partner	All songs	
2008	God Tussi Great Ho	All songs	
2008	Hello	All songs	
2008	Zindagi Tere Naam	All songs	
2008	Khallballi!	All songs	
2008	Heroes		Along With Monty Sharma
2008	Kismat Konnection	One song	Along with Pritam
2009	Main Aurr Mrs Khanna	All songs	
2009	Wanted	All songs	
2009	Paying Guests	All songs	
2009	Kal Kissne Dekha	All songs	
2009	Dhoondte Reh Jaaoge	All songs	
2010	No Problem	One song - title track	Along With Pritam, Anand Raj Anand
2010	Dabangg	Five Songs	Along With Lalit Pandit
2010	Jaane Kahan Se Aayi Hai	All songs	
2010	Veer	All songs	
2011	Miley Naa Miley Hum	All songs	
2011	Yeh Dooriyan		Along With Amjad Nadeen, Meet Bros Anjjan, and Raju Singh.
2011	Chatur Singh Two Star	All songs	
2012	Dabangg 2	All Songs	
2012	Son of Sardaar	One song	Along With Himesh Reshammiya
2012	Ajab Gazabb Love	All songs Except for the Title Track	Along With Sachin–Jigar
2012	Kamaal Dhamaal Malamaal	All songs	
2012	Ek Tha Tiger	One song	Along With Sohail Sen
2012	Teri Meri Kahaani	All songs	
2012	Rowdy Rathore	All songs	
2012	Housefull 2	All songs	
2012	Tezz	All songs	
2013	Bullet Raja	Five songs	Along With RDB
2013	Ishkq in Paris	All songs	
2013	Chashme Buddoor	All songs	
2013	Himmatwala	Four songs	Along With Sachin–Jigar
2013	Rangrezz	Two songs	
2014	Daawat-e-Ishq	All songs	
2014	Heropanti	Three songs	Along With Manj Musik, Mustafa Zahid
2014	Main Tera Hero	All songs	
2014	Jai Ho	Four songs	Along with Amaal Mallik, Devi Sri Prasad
2015	Singh Is Bling	One song	Along with Manj Musik, Meet Bros, Sneha Khanwalkar
2015	Tevar	Five songs	Along With Imran Khan
2015	Dolly Ki Doli	All songs	
2016	Freaky Ali	All songs	
2016	Abhinetri	Two songs	Telugu film
2016	Devi	Two songs	Tamil film
2016	Tutak Tutak Tutiya	Two songs	
2016	Kyaa Kool Hain Hum 3	All songs	
2017	Judwaa 2	One song	Along With Anu Malik, Sandeep Shirodhkar, Meet Bros
2017	Daddy	All songs	
2018	Satyameva Jayate	One song	Along With Tanishk Bagchi, Rochak Kohli, Arko Pravo Mukherjee
2018	Nanu Ki Jaanu	One song	Along With Gunwant Sen, Babli Huque-Meera, Sachin Gupta, Jeet Gannguli
2018	Welcome To New York	Two songs	Along with Meet Bros, Shamir Tandon
2019	Family Of Thakurganj	All Songs	
2019	Dabangg 3	All Songs	
2019	Pagalpanti	One song - title track Background Score	Along with Tanishk Bagchi, Yo Yo Honey Singh, Nayeem-Shabir
2021	Radhe	Two Songs	Along with Himesh Reshammiya, Devi Sri Prasad; Last film with Wajid
2021	Murder at Teesri Manzil 302	All Songs	
2023	Kisi Ka Bhai Kisi Ki Jaan	One Song	Along with Himesh Reshammiya, Devi Sri Prasad, Ravi Basrur, Amaal Mallik, Payal Dev, Sukhbir, DJ Harshit Shah
2024	Naam	One Song	Along with Himesh Reshammiya
2025	Housefull 5	One Song - "Housefull 5 Mixtape"	Along with Shankar–Ehsaan–Loy, Julius Packiam
TBA	3 Dev	All songs	Unreleased

== Non-film albums ==
Sajid–Wajid have scored music for some albums as music directors.

Year	Album	Singer	Lyricist
1999	Deewana	Sonu Nigam	Faiz Anwar
2001	Khoya Khoya Chand	Alka Yagnik and Babul Supriyo	Sameer
2005	Tera Intezar	Rahul Vaidya	Jalees Sherwani and Sajid–Wajid

== Sajid–Wajid as lyricists ==
Year	Song	Film	Lyricist	Music director
2007	Take Lite	Nishabd	Sajid with Farhad Wadia	Amar Mohile
2007	Ruk Ja	Aag	Sajid with Farhad Wadia	Amar Mohile
2007	Jee Le	Aag	Sajid with Farhad Wadia	Prasanna Shekhar
2009	Le Le Mazaa Le	Wanted (2009 film)	Wajid with Shabbir Ahmed	Sajid–Wajid
2009	Life Life	Daddy Cool	Sajid with Farhad Wadia	
2012	Fevicol Se	Dabangg 2	Sajid–Wajid with Ashraf Ali	Sajid–Wajid
2012	Desi Mem	Kamaal Dhamaal Malamaal	Wajid Khan	Sajid–Wajid
2012	Zor Nache	Kamaal Dhamaal Malamaal	Wajid Khan	Sajid–Wajid
2012	Kamaal Dhamaal Malamaal (Theme)	Kamaal Dhamaal Malamaal	Wajid Khan	Sajid–Wajid
2014	Baaki Sab First Class Hai	Jai Ho	Sajid with Irfaan Kamal & Danish Sabri	Sajid–Wajid
2023	Tere Bina	Kisi Ka Bhai Kisi Ki Jaan	Sajid Khan	

== Sajid–Wajid as background score composers ==
Films

Year	Movie
2007	Welcome
2013	Bullett Raja
2013	Ishkq in Paris
2016	Freaky Ali
2017	Daddy
2019	Pagalpanti

Television

- Ramyug (2021)

== Wajid songs ==
Year	Song	Film	Notes
2008	Tujhe Aksa Beach Ghuma Doon	God Tussi Great Ho	
2008	Bang Bang Bang	Hello	
2008	Hello	Hello	
2008	Mitwa Re	Hello	
2008	Do You Wanna Partner	Partner	
2008	Soni De Nakhre	Partner	Nominated for IIFA Best Male Playback Award - Male with Labh Janjua
2009	Happening I Am Happening	Main Aurr Mrs Khanna	
2009	Tumne Socha	Main Aurr Mrs Khanna	
2009	Jalwa	Wanted	
2009	Love Me	Wanted	
2009	Tose Pyaar Karte Hai	Wanted	
2009	Tere Bina Lagta Nahin Mera Jiya	Kal Kissne Dekha	
2009	I Am Falling In Love	Dhoondte Reh Jaaoge	
2009	Nako-Re-Nako	Dhoondte Reh Jaaoge	
2009	Apne Ko Paisa Chahiye	Dhoondte Reh Jaaoge	
2009	Paying Guests	Paying Guests	
2010	Humka Peeni Hai	Dabangg	
2010	Hud Hud Dabangg	Dabangg	
2010	Chandni Chowk Se	Chatur Singh Two Star	
2010	Singh Singh Singh	Chatur Singh Two Star	
2010	Taali	Veer	
2010	Get Set Go	Chase	Composed by Vijay Verma & Udbhav Ojha
2010	No Problem	No Problem	
2011	Nazar Se Nazar Mille	Miley Naa Miley Hum	
2011	Mahi Mahi	Miley Naa Miley Hum	
2011	Wake Up Now	Miley Naa Miley Hum	
2012	PandeyJee Seeti	Dabangg 2	
2012	Fevicol Se	Dabangg 2	
2012	Jaane Bhi De	Ishkq in Paris	
2012	Teri Choodiyan Da Crazy Crazy Sound	Ishkq in Paris	
2012	Mashallah	Ek Tha Tiger	
2012	Mukhtasar	Teri Meri Kahaani	
2012	Humse Pyar Kar Le Tu	Teri Meri Kahaani	
2012	Chinta Ta Ta Chita Chita	Rowdy Rathore	Nominated for Renault Star Guild Awards - Best Male Singer jointly with Mika Singh
2012	Dhadang Dhang Dhang	Rowdy Rathore	
2012	Right Now	Housefull 2	
2012	Govinda Ala Re	Mumbai Mirror	Composed by Amjad Nadeem
2013	Saamne Hai Savera	Bullett Raja	
2013	Bullett Raja	Bullett Raja	
2013	Satake Thoko	Bullett Raja	
2013	Ishq Mohallah	Chashme Baddoor	
2013	Andha Ghoda Race Mein Dauda	Chashme Baddoor	
2013	Dhichkyaaon Doom Doom (Version 2)	Chashme Baddoor	
2013	Govinda Aala Re	Rangrezz	

== Sajid songs ==
Year	Song	Film	Notes
2021	Radhe Title Track	Radhe	last song along with Wajid
2021	Bhai Ka Birthday	Antim: The Final Truth	composed by Hitesh Modak
2023	Tere Bina	Kisi Ka Bhai Kisi Ki Jaan	

== Awards ==
Year	Award	Award category	Award details
2010	Mirchi Music Awards	Album of The Year	Dabangg
2010	Mirchi Music Awards	Music Composer of The Year	"Tere Mast Mast Do Nain" from Dabangg
2011	Filmfare Award	Best Music Direction	Dabangg
2011	Zee Cine Awards	Best Music Direction	Film: Dabangg
2011	Guild Award	Best Music Direction	Film: Dabangg
2011	GiMA Award	Best Film Award	Film: Dabangg
2011	Star Screen Award	Best Music Direction	Film: Dabangg
2011	GiMA Award	Best Music Direction	Film: Dabangg
2011	Zee Cine Awards	Best Track Of The Year	Film: Munni Badnaam
2012	Big Star	Most Entertaining Music	Film: Ek Tha Tiger
2013	Guild Awards	Radio Song of the Year	Song: Fevicol Se
2014	Life ok now awards	Best Album	Film: Main Tera Hero
2016	Pride Of India	Music	Music
2018	Jio Filmfare Awards	Background Score	Daddy
