= Shadaab Faridi =

Shadab Faridi
- Born: Shadab Faridi; Saharanpur, India
- Genres: Pop, Sufi, Dance
- Occupation: Playback singer
- Instrument: Vocals
- Years active: 2010–present
- Label: T-Series

Shadab Faridi is an Indian playback singer from Saharanpur, India. Shadab appeared on the Indian reality show Music Ka Maha Muqqabla A classically trained singer, Shadab's first commercial success came with "Sultan (Title Track)" in the 2016 film Sultan, starring Salman Khan.

== Awards and honors ==
Award	Year	Song/Film	Won/Nominated
Zee Cine Awards	2015	440 Volt	(Nominated)
Mirchi Music Awards	2015	Jashn-e-Ishqa	(Nominated)
Mirchi Music Awards	2015	Man Kunto Maula	(Nominated)
Global Indian Music Academy Awards	2016		Non Film (Nominated)

== Discography ==
Year	Song	Film	Music director	Co-singer(s)	Notes	References
2006	Tere Ishq Mein	Jawani Diwani: A Youthful Joyride	Sajid-Wajid			
2012	Bipasha	Jodi Breakers	Salim–Sulaiman	Shraddha Pandit		
2012	Dariya Ho	Kamaal Dhamaal Malamaal	Sajid-Wajid	Monali Thakur		
2012	Dil Mera Muft Ka	Agent Vinod	Pritam	Nandini Srikar, Shabab Sabri, Muazzem Beg, Altamash Faridi		
2012	Dagabaaz Naina	Dabangg 2	Sajid-Wajid	Rahat Fateh Ali Khan, Shreya Ghoshal		
2012	Tambai Sa Rang	Chakravyuh	Salim-Sulaiman	Salim Merchant		
2013	Sajna Ve Sajna Ve	Mickey Virus	Hanif Shaikh			
2013	Dilli	Mishawr Rawhoshyo	Indraadip Dasgupta	Arijit Singh	Bengali film	
2013	Laahu Muh Laag Gaya	Goliyon Ki Rasleela Ram-Leela	Sanjay Leela Bhansali	Shail Hada, Osman Mir, Altamash Faridi		
2013	Maula	Raqt	Daboo Malik			
2014	Enthaaraa Enthaaraa	Thirumanam Enum Nikkah	M. Ghibran	Chinmayi	Tamil film	
2014	Jashn-e-Ishqa	Gunday	Sohail Sen	Javed Ali		
2015	Ishq Ke Parindey	Ishq Ke Parindey	Sajjad Ali			
2015	"Mohabbath"	Anarkali	Vidyasagar (composer)			
2015	"Ishq Karenge"	Bangistan	Ram Sampath	Sona Mohapatra, Abhishek Naiwal		
2015	"Aayat"	Bajirao Mastani	Sanjay Leela Bhansali	Arijit Singh, Altamash Faridi, Mujtaba Aziz Naza, Shadab Faridi, Farhan Sabri		
2015	"Behki"	Yaara Silly Silly	Ankit Tiwari	Mehak Suri		
2016	"Sultan" (Title Track)	Sultan	Vishal–Shekhar	Sukhwinder Singh		
2016	"Gehra Ishq"	Neerja	Vishal Khurana	Shekhar Ravjiani, Farhan Sabri		
2017	"Lambiyaan Si Judaiyaan"	Raabta	JAM8	Arijit Singh, Altamash Faridi		
2018	"Oh Bhai Re"	Andhadhun	Amit Trivedi	Altamash Faridi		
2018	"Tu Meri Main Tera"	Namaste England	Mannan Shaah	Rahat Fateh Ali Khan, Altamash Faridi		
2018	"Swag Saha Nahi"	Happy Phirr Bhag Jayegi	Sohail Sen	Neha Bhasin		
2019	"Ladies Paan"	Fraud Saiyaan	Sohail Sen	Mamta Sharma, Shahid Mallya		
2019	"Fraud Saiyaan Title Track"	Fraud Saiyaan	Sohail Sen			
2019	"Chammo"	Housefull 4	Sohail Sen	Sukhwinder Singh, Shreya Ghoshal		
2022	"Tur Kalleyan"	Laal Singh Chaddha	Pritam	Arijit Singh, Altamash Faridi		
2022	"Ji Huzoor"	Shamshera	Mithoon	Aditya Narayan		
2022	"Kaale Naina"	Shamshera	Mithoon	Neeti Mohan, Sudesh Bhosale		
2022	"Aethukkoa" - Tamil (D)	Shamshera	Mithoon		Tamil Dub	
2022	"Ji Huzoor" - Telugu (D)	Shamshera	Mithoon		Telegu Dub	
2023	"Tere Vaaste"	Zara Hatke Zara Bachke	Sachin-Jigar	Varun Jain, Altamash Faridi		
2023	"Ve Kamleya"	Rocky Aur Rani Kii Prem Kahaani	Pritam	Arijit Singh, Shreya Ghoshal, Altamash Faridi		
2023	"Ve Kamleya (Sufi Version)"	Rocky Aur Rani Kii Prem Kahaani	Pritam	Asees Kaur, Altamash Faridi		
2023	"Ve Kamleya (Redux)"	Rocky Aur Rani Kii Prem Kahaani	Pritam	Tushar Joshi, Shreya Ghoshal, Altamash Faridi		
2023	"Tere Ishq Mein"	Gadar 2	Mithoon	Neeti Mohan, Vishal Mishra, Altamash Faridi, Sahil Akhtar, Shehnaz Akhtar		
2023	"Main Tera Rasta Dekhunga"	Dunki	Pritam	Vishal Mishra, Shreya Ghoshal, Altamash Faridi		
	"Main Tera Rasta Dekhunga" (Film Version)	Dunki	Pritam	Altamash Faridi		
2025	Rabba Ishq Na Hove 2.0	Andaaz 2	Nadeem Saifi	Palak Muchhal, Asees Kaur		
