= Tezz =

2012 Indian film by Priyadarshan

- Theatrical release poster
- Directed by: Priyadarshan
- Written by: Screenplay: Robin Bhatt; Dialogues: Aditya Dhar
- Based on: The Bullet Train by Junya Satō
- Produced by: Ratan Jain
- Starring: Anil Kapoor; Ajay Devgn; Kangana Ranaut; Sameera Reddy; Boman Irani
- Cinematography: Tirru
- Edited by: T. S. Suresh; Steven H. Bernard
- Music by: Songs: Sajid–Wajid; Lyrics: Shabbir Ahmed; Jalees Sherwani; Score: Sandeep Chowta
- Production company: Venus Records & Tapes
- Distributed by: Venus Worldwide Entertainment
- Release date: 27 April 2012 (India)
- Running time: 122 minutes
- Country: India
- Language: Hindi
- Budget: ₹52 crore
- Box office: ₹26 crore

Tezz (transl. Fast) is a 2012 Indian Hindi-language action thriller film directed by Priyadarshan. It stars Anil Kapoor, Ajay Devgn, Kangana Ranaut, Zayed Khan, Sameera Reddy, Boman Irani with Mohanlal in an extended cameo appearance. The film revolves a team of Asians place a bomb on a high-speed train operating between London and Glasgow. The train will explode if it slows below a certain speed; unless a ransom is paid.

An unofficial adaptation of the 1975 Japanese film The Bullet Train, the film was released on 27 April 2012 and received mixed reviews, with praise for the premise and action sequences, and criticism for the writing. It emerged as a box-office bomb.

== Plot ==
Aakash Rana is an illegal immigrant married to British-Indian citizen Nikita, who lives as a successful engineer. He is eventually caught and deported from the UK, thus crushing his dreams of an ideal life.

Four years later, Aakash returns with a vengeance on his mind and teams up with his former employees Aadil Khan and Megha to wreak some havoc. What follows is a bomb threat on a train and a tense railway control officer, Sanjay Raina, and anti-terrorism officer, Arjun Khanna, trying every trick in the book to avert the disaster and to apprehend the culprits. Sanjay Raina tries his best to save his daughter Piya, and the passengers in the train who are thrown in the mix are police officer Shivan Menon and his team of police force, who are escorting a prisoner on the same ill-fated train. Aakash demands 10 million euros to tell them how to disarm the bomb. The ministry does not want to give the money, but Khanna convinces them that the money will be given back and is a way to lure the terrorists.

After following Aakash's instructions and dropping the money in a river, he walks away. Megha gets the money and tries to get away. She evades the cops after a vicious chase, but unfortunately, she is killed by a van in an intersection. Khanna finds out that Khan is one of the bombers and chases him. Khan is shot in the leg, but he gets away after jumping from the bridge and landing on a jet ski driven by Aakash. Aakash once again demands money and asks it to be left in a dustbin. The dustbin falls inward, and Aakash runs away with the money even though the police attempt to pursue him.

Khanna and his team find out where Aadil is and go to arrest him. Aadil commits suicide with a bomb, almost killing Khanna. Aakash calls Raina and tells him that a note has been left at a restaurant called Delhi Darbar that tells how to defuse the bomb. However, the restaurant catches on fire, and the letter is burnt. Aakash visits Nikita and his son, and they arrange to fly out of the UK that night. Khanna visits Nikita and tells her who her husband is. After changing the plan (that they should leave the UK via train because the police have found out about his plan of leaving via plane), he goes to the train station. There he sees a video of Raina asking the bomber to call again as the letter was burnt.

Aakash calls Raina and tells him that the bomb was not connected to the wheels and the train will not explode if stopped. Raina stops the train and everyone disembarks safely. Nikita, who is helping Khanna now, goes to the train station and sees Aakash and the news that the bomb threat was a hoax. Khanna pursues her and demands she tell him where Aakash is so that he can catch him. Nikita convinces Khanna that it was not Aakash that she saw. Khanna refuses to believe her lies and convinces her that Aakash is a bomber and this is the only time she can save the passengers. She tells him that he is lying to her again because the bomb in the train was a rumor and everyone is safe. Khanna tells her that she is actually helping a criminal, but she doesn't believe him because so many people's lives have been ruined by that law. She lets Aakash go, but Khanna finds out as Aakash's son calls him Daddy. Nikita tries to convince Khanna that it's not Aakash, but Khanna, knowing that she is lying, refuses to listen to her and chases him, and they fight. Aakash tells Khanna to let him go and explains why he took such drastic actions. Realizing that Aakash was a victim of deportation and wants to just be with his family again at peace, Khanna stays silent (hinting he will let him leave scot-free). However, the police arrive; after seeing that Aakash had a gun, they shoot him.

In the end, Nikita receives a letter Aakash had written. It stated that the money (which Aakash asked for to defuse the bomb) was in Aakash's bank locker. He also states that she should give half the money to Megha's brother and Adil's mother. He asks her to tell his son that what he did was to get justice. Finally, Aakash tells Nikita that if they ever meet in the next life, the end of their love story will be much better and bids her goodbye.

== Cast ==
- Anil Kapoor as Anti-Terrorism Officer Arjun Khanna, a cop who tries to stop Rana and his friends.
- Ajay Devgn as Aakash Rana, an engineer, small-time criminal, and has an alliance with his fellow employees.
- Zayed Khan as Aadil Khan, Aakash's employee who is a bomber and assists Aakash in his plans for revenge.
- Kangana Ranaut as Nikita Malhotra / Nikita Aakash Rana, Aakash's wife who has no memory of him since he became a criminal.
- Sameera Reddy as Megha Singh, Aakash's 2nd employee who was hit by a speeding van.
- Boman Irani as Sanjay Raina, Arjun's comrade whose daughter boards a train with a bomb
- Danny Sapani as David, the train driver
- Manpreet Bambra as Arjun's daughter
- Philip Martin Brown as Police Chief Inspector Alan Fisher
- Dominic Power as Joseph
- Avika Gor as Piya Raina, Sanjay and Renu's daughter, who boards a train with a hidden bomb.
- Puja Bratt as Doctor Renu Raina
- Bhavna Pani as Radhika
- Cory Goldberg
- Naveed Choudhry as Worker/Mechanic
- Neeraj Vora as Neerav Shah
- Lee Nicholas Harris as Armed Police Officer SO19
- Jing Lusi as Reporter
- Jamie Maclachlan as Reporter
- Mohanlal as Shivan Menon (Extended cameo appearance)
- Mallika Sherawat as Desi Club Dancer Laila (Item number in song Laila)

== Production ==
Describing the film as an emotional action thriller, Ajay Devgn clarified that contrary to speculations, he was not playing a terrorist but a vengeful emotional man who was against the system but did not intend to harm anyone. The filming began in 2010 but was interrupted for six months due to the cold. The shoot resumed in June 2011 and completed by July 2011. Initially, the work permits were denied for 14 of the crew members by the British authorities due to the film's terror theme. Priyadarshan resolved the issue by clarifying that the film was not about terrorism, and the man who held the speeding train to ransom did not represent any ideology or religion.

Most of the film was shot in Birmingham and some portions were shot in London. Zayed Khan, who trained in parkour for his role, revealed that the film was inspired from a Japanese film instead of the American film Speed or his own film of the same name. Anil Kapoor, who plays a character born and brought up in London, had to re-dub his lines after he watched the film and felt he was losing out on his voice and accent, which happened to be his USP. He also claimed to have done the film only for Priyadarshan since he had confidence in him as a filmmaker, and would not have done it for anyone else. Additionally, three different climaxes were shot for the film, with the final cut for all three versions readied so that there was no last-minute rush to technically process the film once it was time for release. At the same time, Priyadarshan was against the inclusion of an item song featuring Mallika Sherawat (Sameera Reddy was his choice) and tried getting it removed from the film, only to learn the song had been retained in all prints.

Upon the film's failure, Priyadarshan claimed that he had no authority over the final edit because the producers took over the film after the shoot and edited it themselves. As a result, the editing made it difficult for many people, including critics, to follow the film's narration. He claimed it was his mistake because he used to do all the post-production work, including editing, in Chennai, but this time, because the film was shot in Mumbai and abroad, he decided to do the post-production in Mumbai, which was when the producer took over the film from him.

== Music ==
The film score and soundtrack was composed by the duo Sajid–Wajid, with the lyrics written by Shabbir Ahmed and Jalees Sherwani. It was released by Eros Music and Venus Records & Tapes. The music launch was held in Delhi on 30 March.

=== Soundtrack ===
==== Track listing ====
No.	Title	Lyrics	Singer(s)	Length
1.	"Tere Bina"	Jalees Sherwani	Rahat Fateh Ali Khan	5:13
2.	"Tezz" (Female Version)	Jalees Sherwani	Sunidhi Chauhan	5:24
3.	"Main Hoon Shab"	Shabbir Ahmed	Mohit Chauhan	4:58
4.	"Laila"	Shabbir Ahmed	Sunidhi Chauhan	4:46
5.	"Tere Bina" (Female Version)	Jalees Sherwani	Shreya Ghoshal	5:25
6.	"Tezz" (Male Version)	Jalees Sherwani	Shaan	5:16
7.	"Laila" (Remix)	Shabbir Ahmed	Sunidhi Chauhan	3:57
8.	"Tere Bina" (Remix)	Jalees Sherwani	Rahat Fateh Ali Khan	5:16
9.	"Tezz" (Female Remix)	Jalees Sherwani	Sunidhi Chauhan	5:14
10.	"Tere Bina" (Sad Version)	Jalees Sherwani	Rahat Fateh Ali Khan	4:00
11.	"Tezz" (Male Remix)	Jalees Sherwani	Shaan	5:17
12.	"Tere Bina" (Indian)	Jalees Sherwani	Rahat Fateh Ali Khan	5:15
Total length:				59:25

=== Reception ===
Joginder Tuteja from Bollywood Hungama gave the soundtrack 3 stars out of 5, remarking that it delivered slightly more than what one had expected from it, given the fact that the film was an action thriller. CNN-News18 similarly gave it 3 stars out of 5, feeling the album fell short of expectations, but there were a few tracks that managed to "bring about a smile on your face." On the other hand, Jaspreet Pandohar from BBC found it "plain and forgettable." Bangalore Mirror gave it 1 star out of 5, remarking that it was sure to leave a "bad tezz in your mouth."

== Release ==
The trailer was released on 4 January 2012. The film was released on 27 April 2012 in 1950 screens.

Tezz: The Official Movie Game, a mobile video game was released by Indiagames to accompany its release.

=== Home media ===
Tezz was released on DVD and VCD by Eros International.

== Reception ==
=== Critical response ===
The film received mixed reviews. Taran Adarsh of Bollywood Hungama gave it 3.5 stars out of 5, writing "TEZZ is a taut, entertaining action spectacle. Those with an appetite for well-made thrillers should lap it up!" Subhash K. Jha of IANS gave 3 out of 5 stars saying "Not quite edge-of-the-seat, the thrills in Tezz are engaging enough to keep us watching". Srijana Mitra Das of The Times of India gave it three stars out of five.

Conversely, Kunal Guha of Yahoo Movies gave 2.5 out of 5 stars calling it "an epic fail of bomb diffusion by Priyadarshan". Blessy Chettiar of DNA rated Tezz with 1.5 out of five stars and wrote in her review "May be Priyadarshan should stick to mindless comedies, so we can be sure we’re in safe territory. You won't be missing much if you skipped Tezz". Anupama Chopra of Hindustan Times gave the film 2 out 5 stars, writing ″The best thing about Tezz is its length — mercifully short — and the action, choreographed by Gareth Milne (Bourne Identity, Bourne Ultimatum) and coordinated by Peter Pedrero.″ Rajeev Masand of CNN IBN gives 1.5 out of 5 stars and says Tezz is "awfully boring for a film that promises speed and thrills".
