= Kamaal Dhamaal Malamaal =

- Directed by: Priyadarshan
- Screenplay by: Neeraj Vora
- Story by: Benny P. Nayarambalam
- Based on: Marykkundoru Kunjaadu by Shafi
- Produced by: Percept Picture Company
- Starring: Nana Patekar; Paresh Rawal; Om Puri; Asrani; Shreyas Talpade; Shakti Kapoor; Nyra Banerjee; Vivek Gopan
- Narrated by: Rajpal Yadav
- Cinematography: Ganesh Rajavelu
- Edited by: T. S. Suresh
- Music by: Songs: Sajid–Wajid; Score: Ouseppachan
- Production company: Percept Pictures
- Release date: 28 September 2012
- Country: India
- Language: Hindi

Kamaal Dhamaal Malamaal is a 2012 Hindi-language comedy drama film directed by Priyadarshan. It stars Nana Patekar, Paresh Rawal, Om Puri, Asrani, Shreyas Talpade, Shakti Kapoor and Nyra Banerjee. The film has been produced by Percept Picture Company. The story is adapted from Malayalam film Marykkundoru Kunjaadu written by Benny P. Nayarambalam. It was released on 28 September 2012. This film is the reboot of the 2006 comedy film Malamaal Weekly.

== Plot ==
The insinuating cry of every man, woman, and child in this village when they see Johnny Belinda is all about it. Johnny is afraid of everything and everyone. Born into the household of David, a local farmer, and being the only son, Johnny does what he's best at to help his ailing father. Nothing, other than buying lottery tickets every week. The only thing going on in his life is his love for Maria, the daughter of the village's biggest gangster and sworn enemy of David. Peter, armed with three herculean sons, goes to all ends to make sure Maria and Johnny never marry, until one day, hope comes in the form of a silent, strong, but always-hungry man, Kallu, a.k.a. Sam.

One sudden day, Johnny and his family find Kallu in their well. They get him out and feed him dinner. The next day, Kallu and Johnny go to the market, where Peter's sons were beating Johnny. Kallu saves Johnny and beats the goons in return. A friend of Johnny's asks him if Kallu is his lost brother, Sam. With the question, Johnny gets an idea to have Kallu act as his brother and bodyguard. Johnny convinces Kallu to be his brother Sam and tells him the story of his family history. Johnny introduces Kallu to his family. The family, in long wait for their lost son, accepts Kallu as their lost son, Sam.

Kallu assumes the identity of Sam. With the help of his brother Sam, Johnny starts influencing the entire village. Sam also works hard on the farm and helps the family earn a good livelihood. He is well accepted in the family. With the arrival of Sam, good days come to the family. One day, a person tells Johnny's friend that he has seen Kallu in a Kolkata jail, convicted of rape and murder of a woman. Johnny tries to convince his family that Kallu is not Sam but a rapist and murderer. David, however, says that Sam has already told him the story of his going to jail. Johnny asks Sam to tell one thing which he has not told Sam as part of his family history. Sam asks for a mango tree, which was there. This convinces the family that Kallu is actually Sam. They in turn throw away Johnny out of home.

Johnny takes a job at the local church and starts living as the neighbor of his father's house. He keeps looking for an opportunity to kill Sam, but all in vain. On the eve of Christmas, Sam sets the house on fire. Everyone thinks Johnny has done the same and blames him. Johnny, disappointed with himself, writes a suicide note sitting in his hut. At that time, he sees Sam and another man enter the burnt hut. He follows them and finds that Sam and the man have dug into the house. They take out the stolen golden cross of the village church. Johnny is seen by Sam and the other man. Sam tells Johnny that he had stolen it long ago, hidden it under the mango tree, and run away. Later in the meantime, as he came out of jail, the tree was cut and the house was built. So to get this, he had set the house on fire. In the meantime, the other man runs away with the cross. Johnny and Sam catch him in the field. The other man confesses that he was the one who had raped and murdered the lady and told the police that Sam had done it. Sam beats the man to death. Sam injures Johnny, who was trying to take the cross back to the church, but falls again into the well. Johnny, feeling grateful for Sam's earlier help, rescues him. Sam is walking with the cross when Johnny reminds him of the love Sam received from his family. Hearing this, Sam leaves the cross there only. Johnny brings the cross to church, but people accuse him of theft. Johnny is unable to prove his innocence. Suddenly, Sam appears and displays the thief's body. The village accepts this. As decided, if Johnny gets the Golden Cross for church, he marries Maria. Johnny tells Sam he is now a permanent member of the family.

== Cast ==
- Nana Patekar as Kallu / Sam de Mello / Jayant Tirpude, a thief who stole golden cross from St.Rodriguez church, David and Mary thinks that he is their eldest son Kalucharan aka Kallu
- Paresh Rawal as Peter Pyarelal Gonsalves, Mary's lover and father of Gogo, Jojo and Maria
- Om Puri as David de Mello, Mary's husband, father of Johny, Lily, Sara
- Asrani as Father Jonathan Trott, Father at St. Rodriguez Church, Khanpoli
- Shreyas Talpade as Johny de Mello / Bakri, son of David and Mary
- Shakti Kapoor as Pascal Coma, senior assistant at St. Rodriguez Church
- Razzak Khan as Paedro Collins, waiter at Chotu hotel
- Anjana Sukhani as item number "Desi Mem"
- Sona Nair as Mary de Mello, David's wife, love interest of Peter
- Pratima Kannan as Bulbul Auntie aka Bulbulmati Pyarelal Gonsalves, sister of Peter
- Tarina Patel as Lily de Mello, daughter of David and Mary
- Nyra Banerjee as Maria Peter Gonsalves, daughter of Peter
- Neeraj Vora as Pintoo D'Costa, coffin seller and friend of Johny
- Rajeev Pillai as Gogo P. Gonsalves, son of Peter
- Vivek Gopan as Jojo P. Gonsalves, son of Peter
- Abu Salim as Abu Kasai
- Kanchan Pagare as Truck driver
- Rajpal Yadav as Narrator

== Production ==
The film was produced by Percept Picture Company.

== Controversy ==
Catholic organisations in India have protested the film as blasphemous and offensive. The Goan Catholic Welfare Union threatened to disallow the screening in their state. Shailendra Singh of Percept Picture Company has said the film is in fact clean and that he respects the sentiments of Catholics.

== Soundtrack ==
Kamaal Dhamaal Malamaal

Soundtrack album by Sajid Wajid
- Released: 13 September 2012
- Recorded: 2012
- Genre: Film soundtrack
- Length: 25:32
- Language: Hindi
- Label: T-Series
- Producer: Sajid Wajid

Sajid Wajid chronology
Ek Tha Tiger (2012)	Kamaal Dhamaal Malamaal (2012)	Dabangg 2 (2012)

The soundtrack was composed by Sajid Wajid, with lyrics penned by Jalees Sherwani. The album consists of six songs. The audio rights of the film were acquired by T-Series. The album was launched on 13 September 2012 at Mumbai.

Track list
No.	Title	Lyrics	Singer(s)	Length
1.	"Kamaal Dhamaal Malamaal (Theme)"	Jalees Sherwani	Uvie, Wajid	2:21
2.	"Dariya Ho"	Jalees Sherwani	Shadaab Faridi, Monali Thakur	3:49
3.	"Ishq Ki Dafli Baje"	Jalees Sherwani	Babul Supriyo, Sugandha Mishra, Bela Shende	4:20
4.	"Ringa Ringa"	Jalees Sherwani	Ujjaini, Sarosh Sami	4:11
5.	"Desi Mem"	Jalees Sherwani	Mamta Sharma, Sarosh Sami	4:25
6.	"Zor Naache"	Jalees Sherwani	Keerthi Sagathia, Sugandha Mishra	4:20
Total length:				25:32

== Reception ==
Ankur Pathak of Rediff.com gave the film 0.5 out of 5, writing, "Kamaal Dhamaal Malamaal is so terribly scripted and is so tediously long in its running time, you can go home and come back the next day to find the film still reaching its climax.." Shubhra Gupta of The Indian Express gave the film 1 out of 5, writing, "A film that should have been wrapped up quickly and deftly takes over three excruciating hours."
