= Naam (2024 film) =

2024 Indian film by Anees Bazmee

Naam - The Missing Identity
- Directed by: Anees Bazmee
- Written by: Dialogues: Humayun Mirza; Anees Bazmee
- Screenplay by: Humayun Mirza; Anees Bazmee
- Story by: Humayun Mirza
- Produced by: Anil Roongta; Snigdha Dinesh Patel
- Starring: Ajay Devgn; Sameera Reddy; Bhumika Chawla; Rahul Dev; Shriya Sharma; Yashpal Sharma; Vijay Raaz; Rajpal Yadav; Mukesh Tiwari; Sharat Saxena
- Narrated by: Rajkummar Rao
- Cinematography: Johny Lal; Aseem Bajaj
- Edited by: Prashant Singh Rathore
- Music by: Himesh Reshammiya; Sajid–Wajid
- Production companies: Roongta Entertainment; Sonu Films International
- Distributed by: Pen Marudhar Entertainment
- Release date: 22 November 2024
- Running time: 136 minutes
- Country: India
- Language: Hindi

Naam - The Missing Identity is a 2024 Indian Hindi-language action thriller film co-written and directed by Anees Bazmee and produced by Anil Roongta. It stars Ajay Devgn, Sameera Reddy, Bhumika Chawla, Rahul Dev, Shriya Sharma, Yashpal Sharma, Vijay Raaz, Rajpal Yadav, Mukesh Tiwari and Sharat Saxena. It was shot on 20 November 2004 and initially scheduled for a release on 25 February 2005. However, due to various reasons, its release was delayed for nearly 22 years, making it one of the film with the longest production time. The film was released on 22 November 2024 to mixed reviews.

== Plot ==
The story of 'Naam' revolves around a man, played by Ajay Devgn, who embarks on a journey to rediscover his identity after losing his memory.

== Cast ==
- Ajay Devgn in a dual role as
  - CBI officer Amar Chaudhary/Amar Kumar/Shekhar
  - Michael D'Souza, a professional killer
- Sameera Reddy as Lovely
- Bhumika Chawla as Dr. Pooja
- Rahul Dev as Vikram
- Shriya Sharma as Muskaan, Pooja's daughter
- Yashpal Sharma as CBI Officer Yadav
- Mukesh Tiwari as Mukesh
- Sharat Saxena as CBI Chief Sarfaraz Khan
- Rajpal Yadav as Kunj Bihari
- Vijay Raaz as Shyamlal
- Vidya Malvade as Vidya
- Mahie Gill as Mahi
- Shehzad Khan as Mansoor Khan
- Rajkummar Rao as a narrator of the film

== Production ==
This action-drama entertainer began shooting in 2004 and was planned for release in 2005, 2006, 2008, and 2014 but its release got delayed multiple times due to various issues. It was shot in Switzerland and Mumbai. According to a press release issued by the makers, it was delayed due to the death of one of the producers. After that, the film was shelved, unable to find distributors. The film was falsely promoted as only being ten years old by the media.

== Music ==
The music for the movie are composed by Sajid–Wajid and Himesh Reshammiya. Lyrics are written by Sameer Anjaan and Jalees Sherwani.

No.	Title	Lyrics	Music	Singer(S)	Length
1.	"Dum Dum Maaro"	Jalees Sherwani	Sajid–Wajid	Sunidhi Chauhan, Wajid Khan	4:22
2.	"Laila"	Sameer Anjaan	Himesh Reshammiya	Sunidhi Chauhan, Kunal Ganjawala	5:14
3.	"Yuhi Nahi"	Sameer Anjaan	Himesh Reshammiya	Udit Narayan, Alka Yagnik	5:56
4.	"Yuhi Nahi" (Sad Version)	Sameer Anjaan	Himesh Reshammiya	Udit Narayan	2:10
5.	"Ishq Da"	Sameer Anjaan	Himesh Reshammiya	Sunidhi Chauhan	4:35
6.	"Yuhi Nahi" (Duet Version)	Sameer Anjaan	Himesh Reshammiya	Udit Narayan, Alka Yagnik	6:32

== Release ==
=== Theatrical ===
In 2024, having found the backing of financiers and distributors, the film was released.

== Reception ==
=== Critical reception ===
Ganesh Aaglave of Firstpost rated the film 3/5 stars and wrote "Naam is a treat to cinegoers, who still enjoy typical 90s & 00s Bollywood entertainers. Specially, Ajay Devgn is in his signature intense avatar, and his avatar is a treat to his fans." Abhisek Srivastava of Times of India rated the film 2 stars out of 5 and opined "‘Naam’ delivers a lackluster experience with its clichéd, flimsy plot, average performances, uninspired editing, and forgettable songs—making it an outright assault on the senses. It feels like a dated film, with its shots and background clearly reflecting its age and its release highlights how star power continues to overshadow the importance of a strong plot in the industry."

Bhawna Arya of Times Now rates the film 2.5/5 stars and notes "Naam doesn't strike a chord with the audience due to its placement. The screenplay isn't smooth and fails to weave action, suspense and drama. All over, Naam is a layered tale of identity and redemption, with Ajay Devgn delivering a memorable performance." Amit Bhatia of ABP Live rates the film 1/5 stars and writes "The film’s logic is nonexistent, and the suspense, which is supposed to be the film's backbone, is utterly laughable. Ajay Devgn manages to keep his dignity intact, delivering a decent performance despite the weak material. Overall, the movie turns into a meme goldmine but a cinematic disaster."

Risabh Suri of Hindustan Times writes "Stuck in a limbo for a decade, it fails to impress with its bad execution and forgettable performances. Naam is a reminder of the mediocrity which was, and still is, served to us occasionally in the name of entertainment. It reaffirms the belief that some things are just not meant to be." Shubham Kulkarni of OTTplay rated the film 1 out of 5 stars and says "Naam doesn’t feel relevant or nostalgic enough to warrant a release decades after its production. Perhaps the filmmakers should’ve left it in the past and let it remain an unfinished story. This is not the time to release a movie that now feels bizarre, as it’s a relic of a bygone era. It certainly isn’t a story that holds relevance, even in this age of re-releases and nostalgia."
