= Yeh Zindagi Ka Safar =

2001 film by Tanuja Chandra

- Theatrical release poster
- Directed by: Tanuja Chandra
- Written by: Mahesh Bhatt
- Produced by: Mukesh Bhatt
- Starring: Ameesha Patel; Jimmy Sheirgill; Gulshan Grover; Nafisa Ali; Simran Rajiv Ghai
- Cinematography: Manoj Gupta
- Music by: Daboo Malik; Sajid–Wajid
- Production company: Vishesh Films
- Release date: 16 November 2001
- Running time: 146 minutes
- Country: India
- Language: Hindi

Yeh Zindagi Ka Safar (transl. This Journey of Life) is a 2001 Indian Hindi-language romantic drama film directed by Tanuja Chandra and produced by Mukesh Bhatt. The film stars Jimmy Sheirgill and Ameesha Patel. It was released on 16 November 2001.

== Plot ==
20-year-old Sarena's world is picture-perfect — she has an adorable relationship with her industrialist father, Vivek Devan, and is on the verge of major stardom as a pop singer. Jai Bhardwaj's world is poles apart. As the struggling editor of a near-bankrupt Hindi tabloid, "AadarshTimes," he dreams of one day having an office in pricey Nariman Point. He searches for a sensational story that'll get him there.

Through municipal clerk Ganpat, Jai stumbles upon the secret that pop star Sarena is not the real daughter of industrialist Vivek Devan, who had taken great pains to ensure that no one knew she was adopted. Jai realizes that this could be the story he was looking for and goes ahead and publishes it, thus incurring the wrath of Vivek Devan. Even the tabloid owner, Dada, is upset with Jai and disapproves of his idea of unraveling the truth. An enraged Vivek Devan takes legal action against the tabloid by sending a defamation notice for Rupees five crores, and he also tries to suppress any further information being leaked. Sarena, however, notices her father's anxiety and confronts him, only to discover that Jai, despite his crude ways of going about it, had written the truth. Ignoring her father's protests, Sarena goes in search of her real mother. At every stage, her companion in her mission is Jai, who follows her through the journey from Mumbai to Ooty to get the legal notice withdrawn.

With no headway in her search, Sarena seeks Jai's help, inspired by his go-getting ways. As Sarena discovers layer upon devastating layer of truth behind her identity, Jai, too, learns many things about life. On the trip, they fall in love. When Sarena meets her mother, Sister Namrata, she is glad, but her mother doesn't seem pleased. She rejects Sarena by stating that she doesn't have a daughter. It turns out that Sarena's mother was raped by a police officer, and Sarena was the product of that. Horrified by the truth, Sarena teams up with Jai to avenge the injustice done to her mother.

All ends well, as Sarena's mother comes to Mumbai to testify against her rapist. She is able to get justice, and the police officer, who is none other than the Police Commissioner Prashant Marwah, gets arrested. He creates a ruckus in the court during the hearing and walks out, challenging the judge, who orders his police remand for 10 days. Outside the courtroom, Prashant shoots himself, unable to bear the humiliation. Sarena's mother returns to Ooty while Sarena and Jai get married eventually, and Jai manages to fulfill his dream of having his office in Nariman Point.

== Cast ==
- Jimmy Sheirgill as Jai Bharadwaj
- Ameesha Patel as Sarena Devan / Sarena Marwah
- Nafisa Ali as Sister Namrata
- Gulshan Grover as Vivek Devan
- Ehsaan Khan as Police Commissioner Prashant Marwah
- Rajpal Yadav as Dada
- Surendra Rajan as Father
- Simran Rajiv Ghai as Little Girl

== Soundtrack ==
The soundtrack album for the film was composed by Daboo Malik and lyrics were provided by Salim Bijnori (except below).

| # | Title | Singer(s) |
|---|---|---|
| 1 | "Halat Na Poochho Dil Ki" | Kumar Sanu |
| 2 | "Ahista Ahista" | Sonu Nigam, Shradha Pandit |
| 3 | "Nikal Padi" | Udit Narayan & chorus |
| 4 | "Zamane Mein Sabhie Ko" | Hariharan |
| 5 | "Aye Chand Khoobsurat" | Sonu Nigam |
| 6 | "Dil To Kehta Hai" | Kumar Sanu |
| 7 | "Main Kaun Hoon" | Jaspinder Narula |
| 8 | "Dil To Kehta Hai" | Alka Yagnik |

"Ahista Ahista" song is composed by Sajid–Wajid and written by Faiz Anwar.
