= Thalaimurai =

- Poster
- Directed by: Saravana Pandian
- Written by: Saravana Pandian
- Produced by: M. K. Hari Shankar; K. Sethu Rajeswaran; Ashok Shukla
- Starring: K. S. Adhiyaman; Rajkiran; Kanaka; Bhanupriya; Revathi; Raj Kapoor
- Cinematography: T. Anandkumar
- Edited by: Gokulachezhiyan
- Music by: Ilayaraja
- Production company: Muthu Movies
- Release date: 4 December 1998
- Country: India
- Language: Tamil

Thalaimurai (transl. Generation) is a 1998 Indian Tamil-language drama film directed by Saravana Pandian and produced by M. K. Hari Shankar. The film stars director K. S. Adhiyaman in leading role along with Rajkiran, Kanaka, Bhanupriya, Revathi and Rajkapoor playing supporting roles. Revathi received Tamil Nadu State Film Award Special Prize for Best Actress. Adhiyaman, the lead actor of this film later directed Telugu remake of this film Bobbili Vamsam.

== Plot ==
Pandithurai (Raj Kiran) and Naachchiyaar (Revathi) are a respectable couple in the village. Naachchiyaa manages to conceive after 7 seven long years of marriage. She has a still born baby – Pandithurai replaces the dead baby with an illegitimate baby born to Panchavarnam (Bhanupriya) in the same hospital the same day, out of love for his wife, since he thinks that she would die if she hears that her baby was born dead. Raj Kapoor is the villain who is the father of this baby; Panchavarnam and Pandithurai promise each other that they wouldn't reveal this secret to anybody; but their conversation is overheard by Radha Ravi (Naachchiyaa's loving elder brother) and starts hating Muthu since he thinks he is an illegitimate child born to Panchavarnam and Pandithurai, but manages to keep it to himself out of fear of breaking up his sister's family. Panchavarnam joins the thurai household as domestic help. The son Muthu grows up to be an irresponsible but a very tender man (Adhiyaman), he is greatly hated by his uncle and the entire village. Radha Ravi's daughter (played by newcomer Lakshmi) and Muthu are in love and are supported by the entire family except Radha Ravi, who knows the secret of Muthu's parentage. He blurts the truth out to his sister in anger when she asks the reason for his opposition to their children's marital union. How the various characters involved (Pandithurai, Naachchiyaa, Muthu and Panchavarnam) come to terms with this new revelation, forms the rest of the story.

== Cast ==
- K. S. Adhiyaman as Muthuppandithurai "Muthu"
- Rajkiran as Pandithurai
- Revathi as Nachiyar
- Bhanupriya as Panchavarnam
- Kanaka in cameo appearance
- Vadivelu as Thavudu
- Manobala
- Vadivukkarasi
- Radha Ravi
- Sindhu as Rasathi's mother
- Raj Kapoor
- Lakshmi as Rasathi

== Production ==
Actress Lakshmi (not to be confused with the actress of the same name) made her debut in the film under her original name. For her next ventures, including K. Rajan's Aval Paavam (2000), she changed her name to Ritika. Director Raj Kapoor made his acting debut with this film.

== Soundtrack ==
The music was composed by Ilaiyaraaja.

| Song | Singers | Lyrics | Length |
|---|---|---|---|
| "Enna Petha Raasa" | Ilaiyaraaja | Arivumathi | 04:48 |
| "Enna Petha Raasa" | Sunandha | Arivumathi | 04:33 |
| "Vellimani Thottil Katta" | Arunmozhi, Ilaiyaraaja, Sujatha | Nandalala | 05:13 |
| "Thathi Thathi" | Sujatha | Vaasan | 05:09 |
| "Dapangkuthu" | Swarnalatha, Arunmozhi | Then Mozhiyaan | 05:16 |
| "Enga Maharaani" | Ilaiyaraaja, Srinivas | Vaasan | 05:18 |
| "Enna Petha Raasa" (Sad) | Ilaiyaraaja | Arivumathi | 02:58 |

== Reception ==
D. S. Ramanujam of The Hindu wrote, "Though the story belongs to director K. S. Gopalakrishnan's period, director Saravana Pandiyan gives a new glossy mould to the story through his dialogue and screenplay in Muthu Movies' Thalaimurai. It touches a raw nerve or two when the director stokes the flames of ruffled relations between the husband and wife when she learns the truth about the son, the husband standing firm in keeping his promise to the real mother".
