= Priyasakhi =

2005 Indian film by K. S. Adhiyaman

- DVD cover
- Directed by: K. S. Adhiyaman
- Written by: K. S. Adhiyaman
- Produced by: P. L. Thenappan
- Starring: Madhavan; Sadha
- Cinematography: Sethu Sriram
- Edited by: Udhaya Shankar
- Music by: Bharadwaj
- Production company: Sri Rajalakshmi Films
- Release date: 22 July 2005
- Running time: 158 minutes
- Country: India
- Language: Tamil

Priyasakhi is a 2005 Indian Tamil-language romance film directed by K. S. Adhiyaman and produced by P. L. Thenappan. The film stars Madhavan and Sadha in the titular roles, while Aishwarya, Ramesh Khanna, Manobala and Kovai Sarala feature in supporting roles. The film is a contemporary Indian take on life and pregnancy topics. The film is a remake of the long-delayed Bollywood film Shaadi Karke Phas Gaya Yaar (also directed by Adhiyaman), starring Salman Khan and Shilpa Shetty, which was released on 4 August 2006, one year after Priyasakhi. Production began in December 2004 and the film was released on 22 July 2005.

== Plot ==
Sandhana Krishnan, also known as Sakhi, is an automobile company employee who lives in a joint family. He comes across a model named Priya and becomes attracted to her. Sakhi uses Priya's friend to gain her attention. He later comes across her diary and uses it to make Priya fall for him by posing as her ideal guy. Sakhi tricks Priya and his family tells them lies about how Priya is the ideal bride and fits well into their family and they get married. Unlike Sakhi's conservative family, Priya's wealthy family is 'cosmopolitan' and outgoing. Her mother is a party going socialite, while her father restricts himself to his house and is generally ignored by his wife. Priya is accustomed to being independent. Brought up with modern values, Priya finds it hard to adjust with the family of Sakhi, since they believe in different values. Sakhi goes about life as usual, as in before he got married and puts his family before Priya. He tells Priya that they will be going to the movies but Priya discovers too late that the 'date' includes his entire family.

When Priya points out that as newly weds, any wife would want/expect their first outgoing would be just them not a battalion, an angered Sakhi tells her how he wants his family with him. Sakhi hands out the necklace Priya purchases for herself to his sister in front of his entire family because she liked it, without asking Priya first. Priya is upset, but refrains from making a scene, instead choosing to berate Sakhi in private. Sakhi tells Priya that if she likes that necklace she could use it whenever she wants as it stays in the family anyhow. Priya mentions that Sakhi had no right to offer her stuff to someone else and she's only mentioning that he has a bad attitude so he will correct it. They frequently fight because he and Priya are from two different worlds. Eventually, Priya becomes pregnant. Sakhi is overjoyed but Priya has doubts, as she isn't mentally prepared and also because she thinks, their constant fights will have a negative influence on the child. Priya also argues that it has only been four months into their marriage and she's still too young, but they can have kids later. However, Sakhi wants the child.

Priya is miserable but still decides to carry the baby to term for Sakhi and mentions to her mother about her situation. Priya's mother makes an appointment for her to have an abortion. Sakhi finds out in time and rushes to the hospital where a reluctant Priya is being pulled towards the operation theatre by her mother. Priya is injured at the hospital in an accident and Sakhi takes her back to his home to recover. They fight again, and Sakhi forgets Priya's birthday and belatedly wishes her. On her birthday before the party, Priya finds her old diary in Sakhi's suitcase, and the two have an epic argument in which she accuses him of tricking her into loving and marrying him. Sakhi hits her in front of guests and she leaves to her parents' house. She expresses her desire to get divorced, and also to abort the child. Sakhi challenges her decision and takes her to court. The judge rules that Priya will have to continue her pregnancy after which the baby's custody goes to Sakhi. Sakhi moves into Priya's parents' house with her to take care of his unborn child, claiming he doesn't trust them, as they might try to abort his baby. After delivery, Priya moves back in with Sakhi's family for a period of two months, to feed and care for the child. As time passes, Priya becomes extremely attached to the child and is unwilling to leave. She eventually agrees to give full custody to Sakhi since she sees how much he loves the baby.

Heartbroken, Priya leaves with her parents. In the car, her mother happily speaks of another possible husband for Priya while Priya is devastated to leave Sakhi and their child. Finally, Priya's father stands up to his wife and encourages Priya to reconcile with her husband. Priya gets out of the car and stands on the road, unsure of what to do and where to go. Sakhi meets her on the street. The two ask each other for forgiveness and reconcile.

== Cast ==
- Madhavan as Sandhana Krishnan (Sakhi)
- Sadha as Priya
- Rajyalakshmi as Sakhi's mother
- Prathap Pothan as Priya's father
- Aishwarya as Priya's mother
- Ramesh Khanna as Sakhi's elder brother
- Sriranjani as Sakhi's sister-in-law
- Kovai Sarala as Head Constable Kausalya Raman
- Manobala as Babloo
- Sachu as Sakhi's grandmother
- Neelima Rani as Sakhi's sister
- Lakshmi as Priya's aunt
- Seetha as doctor
- Rekha as Judge
- Vaiyapuri as an actor during the film shoot
- Cool Suresh

== Production ==
Adhiyaman began making a project titled Mujhse Shaadi Karogi in 2002, a romance starring Salman Khan and Shilpa Shetty. The project's title was changed to Dil Chura Ke Chal Diye and then to the eventual title Shaadi Karke Phas Gaya Yaar and the film was completed within a year, though the producers delayed the film's release indefinitely. Delays meant that Adhiyaman chose to make the film in Tamil as Priyasakhi with a new cast, while he was still waiting for the Hindi film to have a theatrical release. The film was launched in December 2004 with R. Madhavan and Sadha revealed to be portraying the film's lead roles. Madhavan had a chance meeting with Adhiyaman in Mumbai, when the director revealed his intentions of making the film in Tamil. The film's title was named after the characters of the film's main leads with Madhavan's character name Santhanakrishnan shortened as Sakhi. Sadha revealed that Madhavan had convinced her to play the role and had stated that only she could do full justice to the particular role of a young mother, prompting her to sign on for the project. Prior to Sadha's selection, the team had considered Nayanthara, Meera Jasmine and Sonia Agarwal for Priya's role.

== Soundtrack ==
The soundtrack was composed by Bharadwaj.

Song	Singers	Lyrics
"Kangalinal"	Harish Raghavendra, Janani Bharadwaj	Viveka
"Oh Priyasakhi"	Srinivas, Anuradha Sriram	Thenmozhiyan
"Mudhal Murai" (Male)	Uma Maheswaran	Pa. Vijay
"Mudhal Mudhal" (Female)	K. S. Chithra	Pa. Vijay
"Chinna Magaraniye"	Hariharan	Pa. Vijay
"Anbu Alaipayuthe"	Karthik, P. Unnikrishnan	Snehan

== Release and reception ==
Priyasakhi was released on 22 July 2005. Sify stated that the film was "worth a look", adding that "what works in favour of Priyasakhi is the palpable and terrific on-screen chemistry between the lead pair". Malathi Rangarajan of The Hindu wrote, "To many of the youth of today to whom divorce is no more taboo and marriage in no way sacrosanct the film could appear obsolete. But married folks should relate well to Priyasakhi". Lajjavathi of Kalki felt music was ordinary and panned the poor placement of songs and concluded by questioning why Adhiyaman had to make such a regressive and patriarchal film. Malini Mannath of Chennai Online wrote "The story centeres on Priya and Sakhi, short for Santhana Krishnan, and depicts the duo's love, marriage, separation and reconciliation. But the director has not made attempts to make it any different, resulting in a fare that is littered with stereotyped characters and cliches, predictable scenes and situations, and a narrative style that is decades-old". G.Ulaganathan of Deccan Herald wrote "It is a common story and one feels Adhyaman deliberately takes an anti-woman stance. Even in the end, Sadha is shown compromising and coming back into Madhavan’s life for the sake of her child. One wonders what the director is trying to convey. Does he say that the woman has no right to decide her course of life once she is married?" and noted "Nothing much to say about music and the songs are quite ordinary" and also felt "One saving grace is that there is neither a separate comedy track, not any action scenes — only predictable scenes and a stale climax".

In November 2005, the film was dubbed and released in the Zulu language in South Africa, becoming the first ever Indian film to do so.
