= Muskaan =

- Directed by: Rohit-Manish
- Written by: Atul Sharma
- Produced by: Bhushan Kumar; Krishnan Kumar; N.P. Pachisia
- Starring: Aftab Shivdasani; Gracy Singh
- Cinematography: K. Dattu
- Edited by: Steven H. Bernard
- Music by: Nikhil-Vinay
- Production company: T-Series
- Release date: 26 March 2004
- Running time: 122 minutes
- Country: India
- Language: Hindi

Muskaan (transl. Smile) is a 2004 Indian Hindi-language romantic thriller film directed by Rohit-Manish. It stars Aftab Shivdasani and Gracy Singh in the roles.

== Plot ==
Dashing and debonair fashion designer Sameer Oberoi (Aftab Shivdasani) has everything going for him: a successful career; a secure future; a comfortable and wealthy lifestyle; a beautiful girl Jahnvi (Neha) who hopes to marry him, what more could anyone want? But Sameer has an image of his dream girl in his mind, and he hopes to find her soon. His search for her meets with obstacles of searching for a better model; a series of wrong telephonic connections, all connecting him to a young lady. His group decides to travel to another location, and the young "wrong number" lady, named Muskaan, also travels in the same bus, leading to some more misunderstandings. Sameer takes a liking to Muskaan and decides to appoint her as his new model, to which she agrees. Then their world is turned upside down when Jahnvi, a member of their group, is brutally stabbed in her belly and murdered, and the only clue the police have is that her killer's name begins with an "S," and Sameer becomes a prime suspect in her murder and in the eyes of Inspector Vikram Rajput, who is determined to get the killer at any cost. During the search for the killer, Muskaan (Gracy Singh) and Sameer fall in love. Just as they are about to go to the police station, Muskaan arrives with the cassette in which Jahnvi had left a message for her dad. After hearing this, the killer is actually Satin (one of Sameer's best friends). In the end, Satin is arrested, and Muskaan and Sameer reunite.

== Cast ==
- Aftab Shivdasani as Sameer Oberoi
- Gracy Singh as Muskaan
- Gulshan Grover as Inspector Vikram Rajput
- Shabana Raza as Jahnvi
- Anjala Zaveri as Shikha
- Parvin Dabas as Sharad
- Vrajesh Hirjee as Satin
- Razak Khan as Hotel Manager Godbole
- Poonam Simar as Shweta
- Sharat Saxena as Karan Veer
- Rajeev Verma as Jahnvi's father

== Soundtrack ==
Muskaan

Soundtrack album by Nikhil-Vinay
- Released: 20 December 2003
- Genre: Bollywood film soundtrack
- Length: 1:14:10
- Language: Hindi
- Label: T-Series

The music of the film was composed by the duo Nikhil-Vinay with the lyrics written by Sameer. The soundtrack was released 20 December 2003 by T-Series, which consists of 11 songs. The full album features vocals by Anuradha Paudwal, Udit Narayan, Shreya Ghoshal, Sonu Nigam, Alka Yagnik, Shaan and Adnan Sami.

#	Title	Singer(s)
1	"Woh Ho Tum"	Sonu Nigam, Anuradha Paudwal
2	"Jis Din Teri Meri Baatein"	Udit Narayan, Anuradha Paudwal
3	"Yaad Aayee"	Adnan Sami
4	"Kabhie Jaage Soye"	Udit Narayan, Anuradha Paudwal
5	"Nami Danam"	Shaan, Alka Yagnik
6	"Woh Ho Tum" (Sad)	Sonu Nigam
7	"Nach Punjaban Nachle" (Deleted Song)	Sonu Nigam, Anuradha Paudwal
8	"Jaaneman Chupke Chupke"-2	Anuradha Paudwal
9	"Woh Ho Tum"	Sonu Nigam, Shreya Ghoshal
10	"Ishq Hasata Hai"	Sonu Nigam, Anuradha Paudwal
11	"Jaaneman Chupke Chupke"	Udit Narayan, Alka Yagnik
