= The Killer (2006 film) =

- Theatrical release poster
- Directed by: Hasnain Hyderabadwala; Raksha Mistry
- Screenplay by: Mahendra Lakhan
- Dialogues by: Sanjay Masoom
- Produced by: Mukesh Bhatt
- Starring: Irrfan Khan; Emraan Hashmi; Priyanka Kothari
- Cinematography: Sanjay Malkar
- Edited by: Akiv Ali
- Music by: Sajid–Wajid
- Production company: Vishesh Films
- Release date: 21 July 2006
- Running time: 117 minutes
- Country: India
- Language: Hindi
- Box office: ₹6.51 crore

The Killer is a 2006 Indian Hindi-language action thriller film directed by Hasnain Hyderabadwala and Raksha Mistry. The film stars Irrfan Khan, Emraan Hashmi, and Priyanka Kothari. It is an unofficial remake of the 2004 American film Collateral. The film was released on 21 July 2006.

Khan received a nomination from the 52nd Filmfare Awards for Best Villain for his performance.

== Plot ==
In Dubai, taxi driver Nikhil Joshi unknowingly picks up hitman Vikram, who forces him to drive around the city while he murders witnesses set to testify against gangster Jabbar. As the police mistake Nikhil for the killer, he struggles to stop Vikram and save the remaining targets. When he discovers that his girlfriend Rhea is Vikram's final target, Nikhil races to protect her. After a confrontation at a casino, the police shoot Vikram dead, and Nikhil is reunited with Rhea.

== Cast ==
- Irrfan Khan as Vikram / Roopchand Swaroopchand Solanki
- Emraan Hashmi as Nikhil Joshi
- Priyanka Kothari as Rhea
- Bharti Achrekar as Mrs. Joshi
- Zakir Hussain as Jabbar
- Avtar Gill as Nikhil's boss
- Sanjay Mishra as Police Officer
- Anupam Bhattacharya as Mussa
- Bikramjeet Kanwarpal as Ranbir Oberoi, a CBI officer from India
- Prithvi Zutshi as Kamaal Khan, the singer
- Maya Gurjer as Mallika Khan
- Amit Bhalla
- Menaka
- Manoj Bhaskar

== Soundtrack ==
The Killer

Soundtrack album by Sajid–Wajid
- Released: 15 June 2006
- Recorded: 2005–06
- Genre: Feature film soundtrack
- Label: T-Series

The soundtrack of The Killer features tracks such as "Teri Yaadon Mein" and "O Sanam", performed by playback singers KK and Shreya Ghoshal. The music was composed by the duo Sajid–Wajid, with lyrics penned by Jalees Sherwani. The album was released by T-Series on 15 June 2006.

Track No	Song	Singer	Lyrics
1	"Teri Yaadon Mein"	K.K. and Shreya Ghoshal	Jalees Sherwani
2	"O Sanam" (Duet)	K.K. and Shreya Ghoshal	Jalees Sherwani
3	"Hibbaki"	Suzanne D'Mello, Hamza Faruqui and Earl D'Souza	Jalees Sherwani
4	"Abhi Toh Main Jawan Hoon"	Alisha Chinoy	Jalees Sherwani
5	"Yaar Piya"	Sunidhi Chauhan	Jalees Sherwani
6	"Hibbaki" (Remix)	Suzanne D'Mello, Hamza Faruqui and Earl D'Souza	Jalees Sherwani
7	"Teri Yaadon Mein" (Remix)	KK and Shreya Ghoshal	Jalees Sherwani
8	"O Sanam"	KK, Shreya Ghoshal	Jalees Sherwani

== Reception ==
A critic from Rediff.com wrote that "To borrow an Emraan line from the movie, 'correct bolun toh' the Emraan-Irrfan duo get 100 out of 100, and the film gets just 50". Film critic Taran Adarsh of Bollywood Hungama wrote that "On the whole, THE KILLER is an absorbing fare that should appeal to lovers of thrillers".

== See also ==
- List of Bollywood thriller films
