= Thotta Chinungi =

- Title card
- Directed by: K. S. Adhiyaman
- Written by: K. S. Adhiyaman
- Starring: Karthik; Raghuvaran; Revathi; Nagendra Prasad; Devayani
- Cinematography: Nagendran
- Edited by: Gokula Chezhan
- Music by: Philip–Jerry
- Production company: Span Vision
- Release date: 15 December 1995
- Country: India
- Language: Tamil

Thotta Chinungi (transl. Touch-me-not) is a 1995 Indian Tamil-language romantic drama film directed by K. S. Adhiyaman, starring Karthik, Raghuvaran, Revathi, Nagendra Prasad and Devayani (in her Tamil debut). It was released on 15 December 1995. The film was remade in Hindi as Hum Tumhare Hain Sanam (2002) by the same director.

== Plot ==
Gopal has been in love with Bhuvana since their childhood. As they grow older, they eventually get married.

Soon, problems start to arise. Gopal disapproves of Bhuvana's unemployed younger brother, Prasad, who lives with them, and throws him out. He also grows suspicious of Mano, Bhuvana's childhood friend, a famous singer whom Bhuvana is very fond of.

Eventually, Gopal suspects them of having an affair and throws Bhuvana out of their house.

Bhuvana, who loves Gopal equally, doesn't understand the reason behind his jealousy. She is devastated upon learning that Gopal wants a divorce. Prasad and Mano try talking sense into Gopal, but Bhuvana forbids them. Mano arranges a meeting with Gopal, but it does not end well.

Mano is shocked upon learning that his relationship with Bhuvana has caused problems with Gopal. Mano talks to Bhuvana, who believes that she is at fault. She realizes that Gopal had disapproved of her relationship with Mano and had tried restricting her from seeing him.

Mano promises to never see her again. He explains to his girlfriend Amlu about the incident, and Amlu confronts Gopal. Gopal learns that Bhuvana is pregnant and is in labour. He realises that his wrongdoings and the love Bhuvana has for him, and they reconcile.

== Cast ==
- Karthik as Mano
- Raghuvaran as Gopal
- Revathi as Bhuvana
- Rohini as Amlu (Guest Appearance)
- Nagendra Prasad as Prasad
- Devayani as Ramya
- M. N. Nambiar as Chandrashekar (Guest Appearance)
- Senthil as Pinky
- Padmapriya as Lakshmi (Guest Appearance)
- Vichithra as Monica
- Praveen Gajendran as Young Gopal
- Monica as young Bhuvana
- Kumarimuthu as Krishna
- Pasi Sathya as Sathya
- Rajinikanth as Himself (Reused footage from various films)

== Production ==
Thotta Chinungi is the first Tamil film for Devayani. It is also the debut for Priyan (then known as Nagendran) as the lead cinematographer.

== Soundtrack ==
Soundtrack was composed by the duo Philip–Jerry with lyrics by Vaali. It is Philip–Jerry's debut Indian film.

Track listing
No.	Title	Lyrics	Singer(s)	Length
1.	"Maname Thotta Chinungi" (male)	Vaali	Hariharan
2.	"Maname Thotta Chinungi" (female)	Vaali	K. S. Chithra
3.	"Ramya Ramya"	K. S. Adhiyaman	S. P. Balasubramaniam, Anupama, Anuradha, Jerry
4.	"Rajni Vara Bhavani"	Piraisoodan	Shahul Hameed, Sujatha, S. P. Sailaja
5.	"Coke Pepsi"		Suresh Peters
6.	"Illanthendral Veesum"	Vaali	K. J. Yesudas
7.	"Ilanthendral Veesum 2"	Vaali	Mano
8.	"Ilanthendral Veesum 3"	Vaali	T. L. Maharajan
9.	"Nammoda Thalaivar Ennalum"	Vaali	S. P. Balasubrahmanyam

== Critical reception ==
K. Vijiyan of New Straits Times said the film "proved easy to watch despite running two hours and 45 minutes". Kalki wrote the film flows like a river without the rush of a commercial film and like an art film without the speed of a turtle. D. S. Ramanujam of The Hindu wrote, "The mental conflict of a husband suspecting the platonic relationship of his wife with a male friend, known to her for long, attains glorious proportions, thanks to the wonderful performances of Raghuvaran (husband), Karthik (friend) and Revathi". He also appreciated the writing and direction of Adhiyaman.

== Remake ==
Adhiyaman chose to direct his first Hindi film and began remaking Thotta Chinungi in Hindi as Aap Mere Hai Sanam in early 1998. The film languished in production hell and was eventually released in 2002 as Hum Tumhare Hain Sanam.
