= K. S. Adhiyaman =

Indian film director and producer

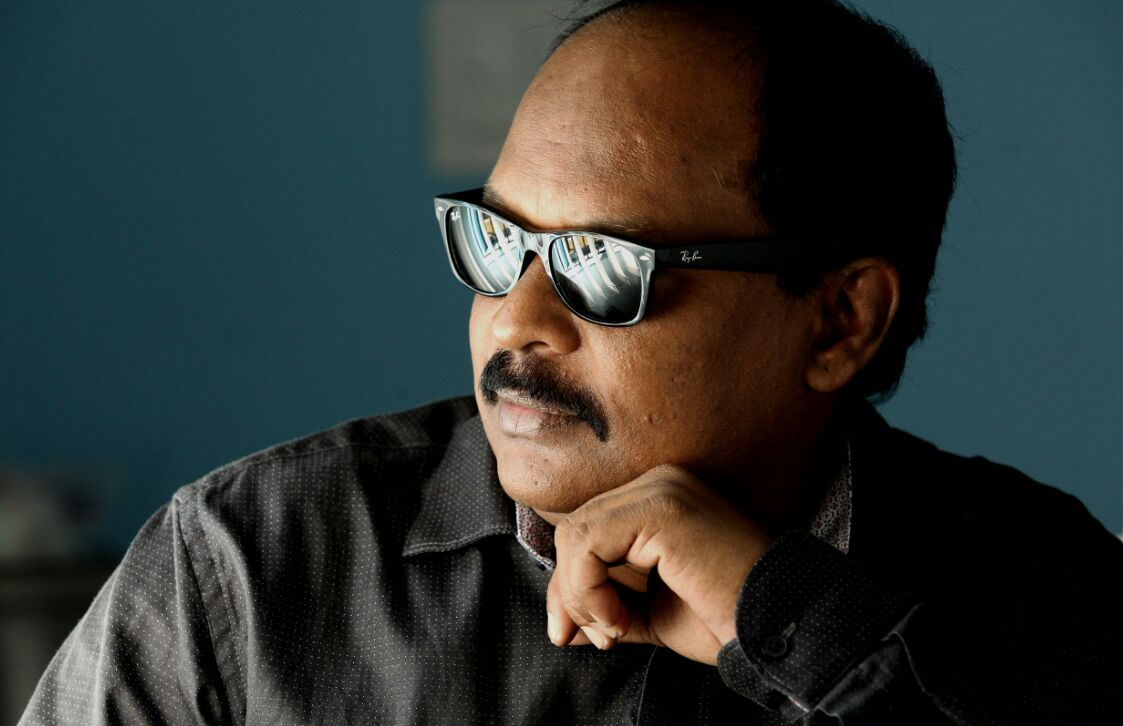
- Born: 3 October 1965 (age 61); Paramakudi, Madras State, India
- Occupations: Director, screenwriter, lyricist
- Years active: 1992–present

K. S. Adhiyaman is an Indian film director, screenwriter and lyricist who works in Tamil, Hindi and Telugu films.

== Career ==
Adhiyaman apprenticed under director K. Vijayan for eight films in the late 1980s, before deciding to become a film maker. After beginning his directorial career with a relatively unnoticed film in Thoorathu Sondham (1992), Adhiyaman wrote the dialogues for Suresh Menon's well received films Pudhiya Mugam (1993) and Paasamalargal (1994) and subsequently bagged the opportunity to make another film. Thotta Chinungi, a relationship drama featuring an ensemble cast of Raghuvaran, Karthik, Revathi, Devayani, Rohini and Nagendra Prasad, won critical acclaim and performed well at the box office. He then featured as an actor in Thalaimurai (1998) directed by Saravana Pandian and won acclaim for his performance, while making another family drama titled Swarnamukhi which had Parthiban and Prakash Raj in leading roles.

Adhiyaman then chose to direct his first Hindi film and began remaking Thotta Chinungi in Hindi as Aap Mere Hai Sanam in early 1998. Notably, the film featured an ensemble cast of several leading actors including Salman Khan, Shah Rukh Khan and Madhuri Dixit while several music composers also worked on the film. The film languished in development hell and was eventually released in 2002 as Hum Tumhare Hain Sanam earning mixed reviews and below average collections, with a critic noting Adhiyaman's "overly simplistic direction lacks both pace and creativity." He then began making a project titled Mujhse Shaadi Karogi in 2002, a romantic drama starring Salman Khan and Shilpa Shetty. The project's title was changed to Dil Chura Ke Chal Diye and then to the eventual title Shaadi Karke Phas Gaya Yaar and the film was completed within a year, though the producers delayed the film's release indefinitely. Delays meant that Adhiyaman chose to remake the film and release it swiftly in Tamil as Priyasakhi (2005) with R. Madhavan and Sadha playing lead roles. Shaadi Karke Phas Gaya Yaar was finally released in August 2006, with the films earning mixed reviews in both languages. In between the ventures, he also started a film titled Hot featuring Neha Dhupia and Parvin Dabbas, but despite completing shoot has not released.

Adhiyaman made another family drama film titled Thoondil starring Shaam, Sandhya and Divya Spandana. Extensively shot in London, Thoondil began shoot in mid 2006 and progressed slowly before releasing to average reviews in February 2008, with reviewers calling it "melodramatic" and noting that it "starts promisingly and turns unsatisfying". Adhiyaman initially planned to remake Thoondil in Hindi with Vivek Oberoi and Bipasha Basu, as well revealing he was set to remake the 2004 Tamil film Ghilli in Hindi with Harman Baweja and Deepika Padukone. He then announced that he was set to remake the Malayalam film Chinthamani Kolacase with Sunny Deol in Hindi as Judgement and would incorporate real life events of the death of journalist Shivani Bhatnagar into the script. Neither of the three films eventually materialised. In early 2010, he began a comedy film titled Amali Thumali featuring Nakkhul, Shanthanu Bhagyaraj, Santhanam, Swathi Reddy and Nikesha Patel in lead roles. The film was initially titled Nanba and had a tagline of 2 Idiots, and thus the media mistook this film for Shankar's Nanban, the remake of the 2009 Hindi film 3 Idiots. The film was later renamed Amali Thumali. Despite filming scenes in locations including Fiji in 2012, the film is yet to be complete and have a theatrical release. In 2014, it was reported that the director was considering directing a Tamil project featuring Nivin Pauly, Amala Paul and Nazriya Nazim in lead roles.

In August 2018, Adhiyaman began production on a horror film titled Angel starring Udhayanidhi Stalin, Payal Rajput and Anandhi. After eighty percent of the shoot was finished, production was halted due to the COVID-19 pandemic. Udhayanidhi subsequently announced his retirement from films to focus on politics full-time, citing that Maamannan (2023) would be his final release and refused to cooperate with the producers to complete Angel.

== Filmography ==
=== As a film director ===
Year	Film	Language	Notes			
Year	Film	Language	Notes	1992	Thoorathu Sondham	Tamil
1995	Thotta Chinungi	Tamil Nadu State Film Award for Best Dialogue Writer				Tamil
1998	Swarnamukhi					Tamil
1998	Bobbili Vamsam	Telugu	Remake of Thalaimurai			
2002	Hum Tumhare Hain Sanam	Hindi				
2005	Priyasakhi	Tamil				
2006	Shaadi Karke Phas Gaya Yaar	Hindi				
2008	Thoondil	Tamil				
2010	Tumse Milkar	Hindi				
2020	Angle	Tamil	Ongoing Project			
2025	Life	Tamil	Under Post Production			

=== Other crew positions ===
Year	Film	Credited as
1993	Pudhiya Mugam	Dialogue writer
1994	Paasamalargal	Dialogue writer
1998	Thalaimurai	Actor
