= Swarnamukhi (film) =

- Poster
- Directed by: K. S. Adhiyaman
- Written by: K. S. Adhiyaman
- Produced by: K. Sethu Rajeswaran
- Starring: R. Parthiban; Prakash Raj; Devayani
- Cinematography: T. Anandakumar
- Edited by: Gokula Chezhian
- Music by: Swararaj
- Production company: Muthu Movies
- Release date: 20 February 1998
- Running time: 160 minutes
- Country: India
- Language: Tamil

Swarnamukhi is a 1998 Indian Tamil-language romantic drama film written and directed by K. S. Adhiyaman. The film stars R. Parthiban, Prakash Raj and Devayani, while Jai Ganesh, Fathima Babu and Manivannan play supporting roles. It was released on 20 February 1998. The film was remade in Telugu with the same name.

== Plot ==
Vanaja is full of gratitude when Varadarajan, a scheming politician, generously helps her daughter Swarnamukhi perform her arangetram in a local temple, but she does not know the man whom she is being grateful to and is forced to become his mistress to safeguard her daughter's future. Akash, a Voltas representative, falls in love with Swarnamukhi and proposes marriage. She tries to keep him at arm's length by revealing her love affair with Pandian, who had left her at the altar. When Akash is still willing, they decide to get married, but then Pandian turns up. In the end, however, Swarnamukhi is triumphant.

== Cast ==
- R. Parthiban as Pandian
- Prakash Raj as Akash
- Devayani as Swarnamukhi
- Jai Ganesh as Pandian's father
- Fathima Babu as Vanaja
- Manivannan as Varadarajan
- Supriya as Commissioner's daughter (guest appearance)

== Production ==
When the film was still under production, Adhiyaman published the story as a serial in the magazine Ananda Vikatan.

== Soundtrack ==
The music was composed by Swararaj, with lyrics written by Agathiyan, Arivumathi, Thenmozhiyan and Adhiyaman.

Song	Singer(s)	Lyrics	Duration
"Kammakkarai"	Arunmozhi, Swarnalatha	K. S. Athiyaman	5:40
"Neeyaga Pirinthayae"	R. Janani	Agathiyan	2:51
"Olivalar"	R. Janani		2:40
"Paavaadaiyaa"	Swarnalatha, Subha	Agathiyan	6:00
"Pollatha"	Gajendran, K. S. Chithra	Arivumathi	5:09
"Poovum Malarnthida"	S. P. Balasubrahmanyam, Swarnalatha	K. S. Athiyaman	4:54
"Unnaithane Vizhiengu"	R. Janani	Agathiyan	2:52

== Release and reception ==
Swarnamukhi was released on 20 February 1998. Parthiban took the film's distribution rights in lieu of his fees. D. S. Ramanujam of The Hindu wrote that the director "draws the best of the three lead artistes, Parthipan, Prakashraj and Devyanai, each trying to outscore the other, the honours being even in the end". He also appreciated the cinematography. K. N. Vijiyan of New Straits Times lauded Adhiyaman's dialogue, the performances of Prakash Raj and Parthiban, but criticised Fathima Babu's performance and felt the cinematography by Anandakumar was "brilliant and at times shoddy and exasperating". Ji of Kalki wrote Devayani struggled while dancing Bharatanatyam but her acting becomes better in second half, he also praised Parthiban's presence as relief in first half, but felt his character's domination in second half reduces the scope of Prakash Raj's character and also found Parthiban's character uttering dialogues demeaning women and the reason for his behaviour were unnecessary and absurd. Ji concluded that since the film had too many dialogues having "naai" (dog), it gave a feeling of sitting in a corporation dog vehicle for two hours. Two years after release, the producers were given a ₹5 lakh (equivalent to ₹21 lakh or US$24,000 in 2023) subsidy by the Tamil Nadu government along with several other films.
