= Partner (2007 film) =

2007 Indian film by David Dhawan

- Poster for Partner
- Directed by: David Dhawan
- Screenplay by: David Dhawan; Yunus Sajwal; Sanjay Chhel
- Dialogues by: Sanajy Chhel
- Based on: Hitch by Kevin Bisch
- Produced by: Sohail Khan; Parag Sanghvi
- Starring: Salman Khan; Govinda; Lara Dutta; Katrina Kaif
- Narrated by: Salman Khan
- Cinematography: Johny Lal
- Edited by: Nitin Rokade
- Music by: Songs: Sajid–Wajid; Background Score: Salim–Sulaiman
- Production companies: K Sera Sera; Sohail Khan Productions
- Distributed by: Eros International
- Release date: 20 July 2007
- Running time: 143 minutes
- Country: India
- Language: Hindi
- Budget: ₹28 crore
- Box office: ₹100.91 crore

Partner is a 2007 Indian Hindi-language romantic comedy film directed by David Dhawan and produced by Sohail Khan and Parag Sanghvi. The story of the film was inspired by the 2005 American film Hitch. The film stars Salman Khan, Govinda, Lara Dutta and Katrina Kaif.

The film revolves around a love guru, Prem, who gives wooing advice and ideas to his client, Bhaskar for the latter's ladylove Priya, and also himself falls in love with a widowed mother, Naina. The film's music is composed by Sajid–Wajid, with background score by Salim–Sulaiman.

Partner was released on 20 July 2007. It received a highly positive response, with particular praise for its comedy scenes and Govinda's performance. A critical and commercial blockbuster, Partner collected ₹100.91 crore (equivalent to ₹110 crore or US$11 million in 2026) worldwide and was the fourth highest-grossing Hindi film of 2007. Dhawan has expressed interest in creating a sequel to the film, but as of 2022 no script had been finalized and news outlets have reported that the film has been shelved entirely.

== Plot ==
Prem is a Love Guru who solves the love issues of his clients. Bhaskar Diwakar Chaudhary comes to Prem for help. Bhaskar loves his boss, Priya Jaisingh, but is unable to express it as she is the daughter of a wealthy businessman. Prem initially refuses to help Bhaskar and goes to Phuket, Thailand. Bhaskar follows him and convinces him to help.

After returning from Thailand, Prem meets Naina Sahni, a photojournalist fleeing from Chhota Don, who mimics Shah Rukh Khan in Don (2006) and is a cricket fan. Prem saves her and falls in love with her. Meanwhile, he starts teaching Bhaskar how to impress Priya. But rather than Prem's tactics, Bhaskar's simplicity and nonsense endear him to Priya, who falls in love with him. Prem learns that Naina has a son named Rohan from her previous marriage, and to impress her, he takes care of him.

Bhaskar reveals to Prem that Priya will marry someone according to her father's will. The two attend Priya's wedding ceremony with Rohan, who convinces his mother to marry Prem, while Priya's father is convinced by Bhaskar. Priya prepares to marry Bhaskar.

Meanwhile, Prem is asked by a spoilt brat named Neil to help convince a girl named Nikki to have a one-night stand with the latter. Prem angrily tells him that he does not help people with bad intentions. Enraged, Neil manages to get his one-night stand anyway and ditches Nikki, telling her the love guru gave him the advice to do so. The girl turns out to be Naina's friend, Nikki. Naina finds out the Love Guru is Prem. She starts hating Prem and publishes a front-page article exposing him and using Priya-Bhaskar's relationship as an example. Bhaskar is fired from his job as a result.

Prem tells Priya what really happened. Priya realizes that all the things she liked about Bhaskar are what Prem wanted Bhaskar to hide from her, and is ready to take Bhaskar back. Prem makes up with Naina by making her hear the truth about him not helping Neil. The two happily marry their partners.

== Cast ==
- Salman Khan as Prem / Love Guru
- Govinda as Bhaskar Diwakar Chaudhary
- Lara Dutta as Naina Sahani
- Katrina Kaif as Priya R. Jaisingh
- Rajpal Yadav as Chhota Don
- Ali Haji as Rohan Sahani, Naina's son
- Dalip Tahil as Raj Jaisingh, Priya's father
- Aarti Chabria as Nikki, Naina's colleague
- Deepshikha as Pramita "Pammi" Purohit, Prem's sister
- Suresh Menon as Kiran
- Punita Trikha as Jewellery Designer
- Puneet Issar as Inspector Rana
- Amey Pandya as Rohan
- Atul Parchure as assistant cop
- Tiku Talsania as Naina's boss
- Ali Asgar as Ali, Naina's colleague
- Rajat Bedi as Neil
- Deepak Dadwal as Bagha
- Vindu Dara Singh as Mr. Chadha
- Shashi Kiran as Newspaper Vender Sadanand
- Razak Khan as John Uncle
- Jason Shah as Priya's fiancé
- Dheirya Sorecha as Nakul Purohit, Pammi's son
- Chinky Jaiswal as Chinki Purohit, Pammi's daughter
- Sohail Khan in a photographic appearance as Dr. Sameer Purohit, Pammi's husband

== Soundtrack ==
Partner

Soundtrack album by Sajid–Wajid
- Released: 12 June 2007
- Genre: Feature film soundtrack
- Label: T-Series
- Producer: Sajid–Wajid

Sajid–Wajid chronology
| Jaane Hoga Kya (2006) | Partner (2007) | Kismat Konnection (2008) |

Professional ratings
Review scores
| Source | Rating |
|---|---|
| Planet Bollywood | 6/10 stars |
| Bollywood Hungama | 3.5/5 stars |

The music was composed by Sajid–Wajid. The soundtrack entered the top five on 23 July 2007. According to the Indian trade website Box Office India, with around 18,00,000 units sold, this film's soundtrack album was the year's third highest-selling.

=== Track list ===
| # | Song | Singer(s) | Picturised on | Length |
|---|---|---|---|---|
| 1 | "Do You Wanna Partner" | Udit Narayan, Devi Sri Prasad, Wajid, Suzanne D'Mello, Clinton Cerejo | Salman Khan & Govinda | 04:30 |
| 2 | "You’re My Love" | Shaan, Shweta Pandit, Suzanne D'Mello, Earl D’Souza | Govinda, Katrina Kaif, Salman Khan & Lara Dutta | 04:35 |
| 3 | "Dupatta Tera Nau Rang Da" | Sonu Nigam, Shreya Ghoshal, Kunal Ganjawala Sukhwinder Singh, Suzanne D'Mello | Govinda, Katrina Kaif, Lara Dutta & Salman Khan | 05:00 |
| 4 | "Soni De Nakhre" | Labh Janjua, Sneha Pant, Wajid | Govinda, Katrina Kaif & Salman Khan | 04:17 |
| 5 | "Maria Maria" | Wajid, Sonu Nigam, Shakib, Sunidhi Chauhan, Naresh Iyer | Salman Khan & Lara Dutta | 04:36 |
| 6 | "You’re My Love" (Remix by DJ A-Myth) | Shaan, Shweta Pandit, Suzanne D'Mello, Earl D’Souza | Excluded in film | 04:27 |
| 7 | "Do You Wanna Partner" (Remix by DJ A-Myth) | Udit Narayan, Shaan, Wajid, Suzanne D'Mello, Clinton Cerejo | Excluded in film | 03:58 |

== Reception ==
=== Box office ===
Box Office India declared the film a "Blockbuster" and was the second biggest domestic opener at that time. It grossed Rs. 1.03 billion in India and $4.19 million overseas.

- Review-Taran Adarsh
- Review- Rediff
- Review - Rajeev Masand

=== Accolades ===
Won:

- Zee Cine Award for Best Actor in a Supporting Role - Male - Govinda
- IIFA Awards for Best Comedian Actor - Govinda
- Producers Guild Awards for Best Jodi of the Year with (Salman Khan)
- Star Gold Excellent Comic Actor Award - Govinda
- MTV Lycra Style Most Stylish Comeback Award - Govinda
- NDTV Imagine Best Jodi of the Year with (Salman Khan)

Nominated:

- IIFA Awards for Best Film - Sohail Khan
- IIFA Awards for Best Director - David Dhawan
- IIFA Awards for Best Actor - Salman Khan
- IIFA Best Actor in a Supporting Role - Govinda
- Star Screen Award for Best Comic Actor - Govinda
- Producers Guild Awards for Best Actor in a Comic Role - Govinda
- Stardust Awards for Best Supporting Actor - Govinda

== Legal issues ==
=== Copyright Infringement Lawsuit ===
Sony Pictures, owners of the film Hitch, contemplated a $30-million suit against both the Indian producers for copyright infringements. It would have been the second time after the 1957 film Begunah, an international film company took legal action against an Indian entertainment company for plagiarism. Partner was eventually released, with Sony acquiring the world's exclusive satellite broadcasting rights.
