= Tumko Na Bhool Paayenge =

2002 film by Pankaj Parashar

- Poster
- Directed by: Pankaj Parashar
- Written by: Rumi Jaffery
- Produced by: Gordhan Tanwani
- Starring: Salman Khan; Sushmita Sen; Dia Mirza
- Cinematography: Thomas A. Xavier
- Edited by: Srinivas Patro
- Music by: Sajid–Wajid; Daboo Malik
- Release date: 22 February 2002
- Running time: 168 minutes
- Country: India
- Language: Hindi
- Budget: ₹11 crore
- Box office: ₹19.89 crore

Tumko Na Bhool Paayenge (transl. I won’t be able to forget you) is a 2002 Indian Hindi-language romantic action thriller film directed by Pankaj Parashar. The film stars Salman Khan, Sushmita Sen, and Dia Mirza. The film was released on 22 February 2002.

== Plot ==
Veer Thakur is an eligible bachelor living in a small community with his parents: Thakur Punya Pratap Singh and Thakurain Geeta. He is in love with Muskaan, his friend and daughter of another Thakur. Their parents give their blessing to their union, but Veer suddenly starts getting visions of events that he can't remember ever happening to him and finds that he is an expert in fighting techniques even though he is not a wrestler, including his father, has ever seen before. Nobody has any explanation for these facts. Veer is a good fast bowler too and has the ability to swing the ball in both directions.

One day, as the Chief Minister, is giving a speech at a certain function in his village, Veer suddenly spots a sniper trying to aim at the CM. Veer lunges to save the CM, only to find that the sniper and the building are both missing. Veer grows restless, but nobody notices that the CM has grown restless on seeing Veer. Some days later, at Veer's wedding, some goons attack the party and try to kill Veer, but Veer kills them singlehandedly. Convinced that everyone is hiding something important from him, he demands answers. The Thakur relents and tells him that he is neither Veer nor their son.

The real Veer was an officer in the Indian Army who was killed in action in Kargil War. After immersing in his ashes, he found the bullet-ridden body of an unknown man. When he realized that this man had no memories of his past, he told him that he is Veer and concoct a past for him, because they feel the need to have a son. Veer decides to go on a quest to find his real identity. He goes to Mumbai to find that both the police and goons are baying for his blood. He meets a teenager named Ahsan, aka Munna, who calls him Ali Bhaijaan (brother), but Munna dies while trying to save Ali from an assassin. The hero does not see the face of the assassin but assumes that his name is Ali. He gets visions of a girl whom he has never seen.

The mystery starts unwinding when he meets a guy named Inder. As Ali starts getting his memories, it is confirmed that his name is indeed Ali. Ali and Munna were orphaned brothers, while Inder was Ali's friend. An old man named Rahim Chacha was their guardian. The mysterious girl Ali saw was Mehak, his love. Ali and Inder had won medals for shooting during many contests, although Ali was always better. The marksmanship skills are noticed by the Joint Commissioner of Mumbai Crime Branch, M.K. Sharma, who proposes them: masquerade as goons of a gang, kill goons of their rival gang and trick both gangs to destroy each other in gang wars. Ali refuses flatly, but after some goons kill Rahim Chacha, Ali and Inder decide to take the offer.

Mehak gives both the guys portable video recorders so that they can prove their innocence if anything goes wrong. Soon, the Inspector takes them to the Chief Minister and his aide. They plan to enact an attack on the CM, making the opposition look dirty in the eyes of the people and garnering sympathy votes for the CM. However, when Ali is trying to fake the shooting, somebody kills the CM. The police start chasing Ali, thinking that he is the killer and Ali flees.

After recovering his memory, Ali realizes that the CM's aide took advantage of the plan to become CM himself. Meanwhile, Ali learns that Inder made Mehak his wife to save her from harassment. Ali tries to tell the truth to the Inspector but realizes that nobody believes him. In an attack, when Ali goes aboard a local train, the remaining memories come to him. He remembers boarding the train the same way on the day of the assassination, where Inder met him and confessed to killing the CM. Thereafter, Inder shot Ali to hide the truth and threw his body in a river. Suddenly, the Inspector confronts him, and Ali convinces the Inspector by telling the truth.

Ali goes to Mehak and tells her everything. He realizes that there must be some incriminating evidence in Inder's tapes. As he plays a tape, Mehak witnesses in horror Inder striking the deal with the CM's aide. Ali notifies Inder that he remembers everything now. Inder, along with his cronies, come to kill Ali, and Mehak dies in the process. This angers Ali, and he kills the goons. Inder and Ali have a hand-to-hand fight. Ali demands Inder an explanation for his actions.

Inder reveals that he was always second best with Ali around and that even Mehak, whom he secretly loved, chose Ali over him. Also, Ali always got money and fame more easily than Inder. Inder reveals that he had sent the goons to kill Rahim Chacha, thus manipulating Ali to take the offer. Also, when Ali came back to Mumbai, Inder saw him. Inder was the sniper whom Ali's brother, Munna, saw.

Ali kills Inder in combat and afterward broadcasts Inder's tape over the cable TV network, thus freeing himself from his charges and putting the present CM in the dock. He returns to the village and marries Muskaan, just as planned.

== Cast ==
- Salman Khan as Ali / Veer Singh Thakur
- Sushmita Sen as Mehak, Inder's later wife
- Dia Mirza as Muskan Singh, Veer's fiance
- Inder Kumar as Inder Saxena, Mehak's later husband (voice dubbed by Akshay Anand)
- Nishigandha Wad as Geeta Singh Thakur, Veer's mother
- Sharat Saxena as Kunal Singh Thakur, Veer's father
- Mukesh Rishi as JSP M. K Sharma
- Rajpal Yadav as Lallan
- Sadashiv Amrapurkar as Chief Minister
- Anjan Srivastav as Home Minister Sadanand Pandey
- Pankaj Dheer as Shivpratap Singh, Muskan's father
- Alok Nath as Rahim Chacha
- Razak Khan as Dilbar Khan
- Johnny Lever as Pakhandee Baba
- Sumeet Pathak as Azaan / Munna
- Arbaaz Khan as Veer Singh Thakur (special appearance)

== Soundtrack ==
Tumko Na Bhool Paayenge

Soundtrack album by Sajid–Wajid Daboo Malik
- Released: 21 December 2001
- Genre: Feature film soundtrack
- Label: T-Series
- Producer: Sajid–Wajid

#	Title	Singer(s)	Music	Length
1	"Bindiya Chamke Choodi Khanke"	Sonu Nigam, Alka Yagnik	Daboo Malik	05:12
2	"Kya Hua Tujhe"	Sonu Nigam, Alka Yagnik	Daboo Malik	05:05
3	"Yeh Bekhudi Deewangi"	Sonu Nigam	Sajid–Wajid	06:20
4	"Mubarak Eid Mubarak"	Sonu Nigam, Arvinder Singh, Sneha Pant	Sajid–Wajid	06:22
5	"Kyon Khanke Teri Choodi"	Kamaal Khan, Alka Yagnik	Sajid–Wajid	05:11
6	"Mehendi Hai Rachi Mere Haanthon Mein"	Sonu Nigam, Jaspinder Narula	Daboo Malik	05:40
7	"Ye Bekhudi Deewangi"	Sonu Nigam	Sajid–Wajid	06:20
8	"Main To Ladki Kunwari"	Sonu Nigam, Sneha Pant	Sajid–Wajid	06:11
9	"Kyon Khanke Teri Choodi" (Club Mix)	Kamaal Khan, Alka Yagnik	Sajid–Wajid	04:29

== Reception ==
Sukanya Verma of Rediff wrote, "Tumko Na Bhool Payenge is not a performance-oriented film, so there's not much to go by. Salman Khan's transition from a timid, happy-go-lucky fellow to a tough-as-nails, man-on-a-mission is far from convincing".

== See also ==
- Jor Kore Bhalobasha Hoy Na, 2013 Bangladeshi remake
