= Bewafa Sanam =

- Poster
- Directed by: Gulshan Kumar
- Written by: Dialogues: Madan Joshi
- Screenplay by: Sachin Bhowmick
- Story by: Gulshan Kumar
- Produced by: Gulshan Kumar
- Starring: Krishan Kumar; Aruna Irani; Beena Banerjee; Shilpa Shirodkar; Shakti Kapoor; Kiran Kumar
- Cinematography: Thomas Xavier
- Edited by: Omkar Bhakri
- Music by: Nikhil-Vinay; Amar Utpal; Milind Sagar; Raju Singh
- Distributed by: T-Series
- Release date: 12 May 1995
- Running time: 145 minutes
- Country: India
- Language: Hindi
- Budget: ₹ 1.25 crore
- Box office: ₹ 8.49 crore

Bewafa Sanam (transl. Disloyal Lover) is a 1995 Hindi-language musical thriller film directed and produced by Gulshan Kumar. It stars his younger brother Krishan Kumar, Shilpa Shirodkar, Aruna Irani, Beena Banerjee, Shakti Kapoor and Kiran Kumar. The screenplay was written by Sachin Bhowmick, dialogues by Madan Joshi, and story by Gulshan Kumar.

== Plot ==
Sundar and Sheetal love each other and hope to get married soon. His mother approves of this alliance. Sundar makes his living by playing cricket and has become a very popular cricketer which has brought about many enemies in his life. Among them are Gautam, who conspires with Sheetal to bring about the downfall of Sundar, to which Sheetal agrees because Gautam has Sheetal's mother captive and threatens to kill her if Sheetal does not agree to all his schemes. Gautam sends goons after Sundar who thrashes them and is arrested.

In prison, Sundar finds out about Sheetal and Gautam's wedding. He manages to escape and gatecrashes the wedding and shoots Sheetal. He is charged for this crime and is given the death sentence. Later on, a journalist tries to help him and finds out everything that happened. It is revealed that the actual murderer was Gautam. Once Sundar realises that Sheetal was forced to do everything and she actually loved him, he requests the authorities to let him visit her grave one last time before he is hanged for his crime and they fulfill his request. Sundar kisses the grave and the police come with a letter saying that Sundar is free. Everyone is happy and rushes to tell Sundar, but he had died by the grave of his lover.

== Cast ==
- Krishan Kumar as Sundar
- Shilpa Shirodkar as Sheetal/Mamta
- Shakti Kapoor as Jailor Zalim Singh
- Kiran Kumar as Jailor Ramprasad Shukla, Mamta's father
- Asrani as Omkar, the college canteen owner
- Paintal as Ramu Kaka
- Aruna Irani as Sheetal's mother
- Beena Banerjee as Mamta's mother
- Reema Lagoo as Sunder's mother
- Rakesh Bedi as inmate No. 204
- Sagar as Gautam
- Sadashiv Amrapurkar as John

== Soundtrack ==
The music was composed by Nikhil-Vinay Amar Utpal, Milind Sagar and Raju Singh. Sonu Nigam was main male voice while Anuradha Paudwal and Sushma Shrestha were female voices. Udit Narayan & Nitin Mukesh also rendered their voice for one song each. The album became very popular. The songs "Achha Sila Diya", by Sonu Nigam & "O Dil Tod Ke Hasti Ho Mera" by Udit Narayan are popular. According to the Indian trade website Box Office India, with around 30,00,000 units sold the soundtrack became the fifth highest-selling album of the year. Several songs of the album such as "Wafa Na Raas Aayee Tujhe O Harjaee", "Achha Sila Diya Toone Mere Pyar Ka", "O Dil Tod Ke Hansti Ho Mera", "Yeh Dhoke Pyar Ke Dhoke" were originally created by Attaullah Khan.

=== Track listing ===
#	Title(s)	Singer(s)	Lyricist(s)	Music
1.	"Ooyee Ooyee Meri Amma"	Poornima	Yogesh	Nikhil-Vinay
2.	"Wafa Na Raas Aayee Tujhe O Harjaee"	Nitin Mukesh	Yogesh	Nikhil-Vinay
3.	"Achha Sila Diya Toone Mere Pyar Ka"	Sonu Nigam	Yogesh	Nikhil-Vinay
4.	"O Dil Tod Ke Hansti Ho Mera"	Udit Narayan	Yogesh	Nikhil-Vinay
5.	"Yeh Dhoke Pyar Ke Dhoke"	Sonu Nigam	S M Sadiq	Nikhil-Vinay
6.	"Zindadi Bas Sajna Da Pyar"	Anuradha Paudwal	Rani Malik	Amar Utpal
7.	"Zindagi Mein To Sabhi Pyar Kiya Karte Hain"	Sonu Nigam	Rani Malik	Milind Sagar
8.	"Teri Gali Vichchon Utthega Janaza Mera"	Sonu Nigam	Akram Rahi	Nikhil-Vinay
9.	"Nargisi Nargisi Aankhein Teri Nargisi"	Jolly Mukherjee	Tabish Romani	Raju Singh
