= Hum Tumhare Hain Sanam =

2002 Indian film by K. S. Adhiyaman

- Theatrical release poster
- Directed by: K. S. Adhiyaman
- Written by: K. S. Adhiyaman, Reema Rakesh Nath (dialogues)
- Based on: Thotta Chinungi by K. S. Adhiyaman
- Produced by: K. C. Bokadia
- Starring: Shah Rukh Khan; Salman Khan; Madhuri Dixit
- Cinematography: T. Anandha Kumar
- Edited by: D. N. Malik
- Music by: Songs: Nadeem-Shravan; Daboo Malik; Bappi Lahiri; Nikhil-Vinay; Bali Brahmbhatt; Sajid-Wajid; Background Score: Uttam Singh
- Production company: BMB Productions
- Distributed by: Eros International
- Release date: 24 May 2002
- Running time: 175 minutes
- Country: India
- Language: Hindi
- Budget: ₹12 crore
- Box office: ₹34.76 crore

Hum Tumhare Hain Sanam (transl. I am yours, darling) is a 2002 Indian Hindi-language romantic drama film directed by K. S. Adhiyaman. The film stars Shah Rukh Khan, Salman Khan and Madhuri Dixit, with Aishwarya Rai in a guest appearance.

Hum Tumhare Hain Sanam was delayed for six years as a result of production issues. The film is a remake of 1995 Tamil film Thotta Chinungi directed by Adhiyaman himself. The film was produced by K. C. Bokadia. The rights of the film is owned by Shah Rukh Khan's Red Chillies Entertainment.

== Plot ==
Dev Narayan lives with his daughter Laxmi and her children, Radha and Prashant. He also looks after two orphans, Gopal and Nita. When he refuses to pay for surgery on Ramnath, Laxmi's husband, she leaves with her children. Ramnath eventually dies. One day, when Laxmi was feeding dinner to her kids, she spots and adopts an orphaned boy named Suraj, whom Radha forms a sisterly bond with.

=== 20 years later ===
Suraj, now a famous singer, is grateful to Radha for contributing to his success through her support. Gopal, one of the two orphans Dev took in, is a rich businessman. After Laxmi dies in an accident, Radha and Prashant shift to Dev's house. Gopal falls in love with Radha, resulting in Dev getting them married. After some time, Gopal frequently spots Radha spending an immense amount of time with Suraj and prioritizing Suraj over him and suspects them to be having an affair.

As time passes, misunderstandings continue to increase, including incidents during their honeymoon and another incident resulting in Prashant getting thrown out, eventually causing an enraged Gopal to throw Radha out of his house. He grows angry and bitter at the world, and refuses to hear out Radha and Suraj. However, later, he realizes he misunderstood their sibling like relationship for an affair. Gopal thus reunites with Radha and apologizes to Suraj, who also has a girlfriend Suman. All live happily ever after.

== Cast ==
- Shah Rukh Khan as Gopal Sharma
- Madhuri Dixit as Radha Sharma, Gopal's wife
- Salman Khan as Suraj Chauhan
- Aishwarya Rai as Suman, Suraj's girlfriend (special appearance)
- Alok Nath as Dev Narayan
- Aruna Irani as Laxmi Chauhan, Radha and Prashant's mother
- Atul Agnihotri as Prashant Chauhan, Radha's brother
- Suman Ranganathan as Nita Sharma, Gopal's sister
- Laxmikant Berde as Hasmukh
- Vikas Anand as Ramu
- Asha Sharma as Mohana
- Dinesh Hingoo as Lawyer
- Payal Malhotra as Gopal's secretary

== Soundtrack ==
Hum Tumhare Hain Sanam

Soundtrack album by Nadeem-Shravan Nikhil–Vinay Daboo Malik Bappi Lahiri Bali Brahmabhatt Sajid–Wajid
- Released: 19 January 2002
- Recorded: 1996–2002
- Genre: Feature film soundtrack
- Label: T-Series

Professional ratings
Review scores
| Source | Rating |
|---|---|
| Planet Bollywood | 7.5/10 stars |

The music was composed by Nadeem-Shravan, Nikhil–Vinay, Daboo Malik, Bappi Lahiri, Bali Brahmabhatt, and Sajid–Wajid. The lyrics were penned by Sameer, Praveen Bhardwaj, Maya Govind, Kartik Avasthi, and Jalees Sherwani. The background score was composed by Uttam Singh. According to the Indian trade website Box Office India, with around 20,00,000 units sold, this film's soundtrack album was the year's fifth highest-selling. The tune of the title song 'Hum Tumhare Hain Sanam' is similar to Pakistani singer Hadiqa Kiani's 1998 song "Boohe Baariyaan".

=== Track listing ===
| No. | Title | Lyrics | Music | Singer(s) | Length |
|---|---|---|---|---|---|
| 1. | "Hum Tumhare Hain Sanam" | Sameer | Nikhil-Vinay | Anuradha Paudwal, Udit Narayan | 05:58 |
| 2. | "Khoye Khoye Din Hain" | Praveen Bhardwaj | Daboo Malik | Anuradha Paudwal, Sonu Nigam | 04:59 |
| 3. | "Gale Mein Laal Taai" | Maya Govind | Bappi Lahiri | Kumar Sanu, Bela Sulakhe | 06:00 |
| 4. | "Sab Kuchh Bhula Diya" | Kartik Avasthi | Bali Brahmabhatt | Sonu Nigam | 07:56 |
| 5. | "Taaron Ka Chamakta" | Sameer | Nadeem-Shravan | Udit Narayan, Bali Brahmabhatt | 06:29 |
| 6. | "Hum Tumhare Hain Sanam (Sad)" | Sameer | Nikhil-Vinay | Sonu Nigam | 02:22 |
| 7. | "Na Na Nana" | Praveen Bhardwaj | Daboo Malik | Sonu Nigam | 05:18 |
| 8. | "Dil Chhod Aaya" | Jalees Sherwani | Sajid–Wajid | Sonu Nigam (non-movie version), Vinod Rathod (movie version) | 05:12 |
| 9. | "Aa Gaya Aa Gaya" | Sameer | Nadeem-Shravan | Udit Narayan | 06:59 |
| 10. | "Sab Kuchh Bhula Diya" | Kartik Avasthi | Bali Brahmabhatt | Sapna Awasthi, Sonu Nigam | 07:55 |
| 11. | "Theme Music" | | | Instrumental |

== Critical reception ==
Derek Elley of Variety wrote that "Despite a cast that "reunites" some of Hindi cinema's biggest names, the long-awaited Hum Tumhare Hain Sanam which finally premiered in late May, reps a major disappointment. Omar Ahmed of Empire Online noted that "Love triangles are a common device in Bollywood flicks, and sadly, Hum Tumhare Hain Sanam has nothing new to offer." A critic from Radio Times stated that "Nuance isn't a Bollywood specialty, and there's little in the way of subtle shading here but, with its impressive all-star cast and songs from some of India's leading composers, this enjoyable melodrama can't be beaten for big, bold emotion". The Times of India wrote that "The film is a ready reckoner for everything that should be avoided in a good film".

Anita Bora of Rediff.com writes, "A medium-sized dose of love with a big dash of suspicion. Add to it several scoops of friendship. Towards the end, add a few drops of humor". She even says that "The premise of the film is simple. Jealousy. If you discount the fact the 'falling in love' was instant (but when is it not?), the topic is quite interesting. Haven't we all at some point read too much into situations, overreacted, undergone pangs of jealousy that seem downright silly later?"

== Box office ==
Hum Tumhare Hain Sanam grossed ₹22.26 crore (US$2.3 million) in India and $2.55 million (₹12.49 crore) in other countries, for a worldwide total of ₹34.76 crore (US$3.6 million), against its ₹12 crore (US$1.2 million) budget. It had a worldwide weekend opening of ₹11.11 crore (US$1.2 million), and grossed ₹17.23 crore (US$1.8 million) in its first week.
