= Bali Brahmbhatt =

- Born: Nairobi, Kenya
- Genres: Playback; hip hop; Bollywood; reggae
- Occupations: Music Director, Singer, Rapper
- Years active: 1993 - 2012

Bali Brahmbhatt is a Gujarati music director and playback singer who mainly performs Bollywood songs.

== Discography ==
He is currently an RJ in the UK in Lyca Gold Radio based in Canary Wharf, South Quay London E14. His Radio show is quite famous which is Gold Afternoon.

=== As a Music Director ===
Year	Film
2002	Hum Tumhare Hain Sanam

=== As a Lyricist ===
Year	Song	Film
2002	Sab Kuchh Bhula Diya	Hum Tumhare Hain Sanam

=== As a Playback Singer ===
Year	Song	Film
1993	Lena Hai Lena Hai	Bomb Blast
1993	Tu Roop Ki Rani Tu Choron Ka Raja	Roop Ki Rani Choron Ka Raja
1994	Amma Dekh Tera Munda Bigda Jaye	Stuntman
1994	Jai Radhe Radhe - Male (Version 2)	Paramatma
1994	Dekha Tujhe To Dil Gane Laga	Teesra Kaun
1994	Mere Savre Savariya	Ekka Raja Rani
1995	Pump Up The Bhangra	Ram Jaane
1995	Gunda Rap	Aatank Hi Aatank
1995	Bad Boys	Gundaraj
1995	Maza Karle Meri Jaan	Andolan
1996	Habibi Twist Karenge Twist	Himmat
1996	Jug Magati Hai	Return of Jewel Thief
1996	Mera Baba Shahi Fakir	Khiladiyon Ka Khiladi
1996	Romance Road Per	Mafia
1996	Main Aaya Hoon	Chhote Sarkar
1997	Shaadi Karke Phas Gaya	Judaai
1997	Munde Aur Kudiyan Disko Bhangra Karne Aaye	Shapath
1998	Bhangra Paun Aaya	Jaane Jigar
1999	Aaj Peene De	Kaala Samrajya
1999	Yaar Ka Paigham	Dulhan Banoo Main Teri
1999	Sasujee Tera Laadla	Aashique Mastane
1999	Otashi Anata	Aa Ab Laut Chalen
2000	Kadi Te Aana Bali Di Gali	Jung
2000	Kem Chhe	Jis Desh Mein Ganga Rehta Hai
2001	Sau Rab Di - Sad	Pyar Zindagi Hai
2002	Taaron Ka Chamakta	Hum Tumhare Hain Sanam
2002	Yahan Pe Shanti Hai	Raaz
2003	My Name Is Gurdeep	Waisa Bhi Hota Hai Part II
2007	Krishna's Eternal Love : Mitwa humare	Krishna's Animated Series

=== Albums ===
Year	Album	Artist	Music Director	Label
2007	Banjara	Bali Brahmbhatt		

Year	Album	Artist	Music Director	Label
1995	Gabbar mix	Bali Brahmbhatt		
