= Dhoondte Reh Jaaoge =

2009 Indian film by Umesh Shukla

Dhoondte Reh Jaoge
- The movie poster
- Directed by: Umesh Shukla
- Written by: Umesh Shukla
- Produced by: Ronnie Screwvala
- Starring: Kunal Khemu; Soha Ali Khan; Sonu Sood; Paresh Rawal; Dilip Joshi; Johnny Lever
- Cinematography: Manoj Gupta
- Edited by: Ashfaque Makrani
- Music by: Sajid–Wajid
- Distributed by: UTV Motion Pictures
- Release date: 6 March 2009
- Running time: 131 minutes
- Country: India
- Language: Hindi

Dhoondte Reh Jaoge (English: You Will Keep on Searching) is a 2009 Indian spoof comedy film written and directed by debutante Umesh Shukla and produced by Ronnie Screwvala under UTV Motion Pictures and Bindass. The film stars Kunal Khemu, Paresh Rawal, Sonu Sood, Soha Ali Khan, Dilip Joshi and Johnny Lever. It was released on 6 March 2009 in India, and 20 March 2009, in the United States. The music was composed by duo Sajid–Wajid.

== Plot ==
Raj Chopra is a good-for-nothing Bollywood film producer in Mumbai whose recent films have all failed at the box office. He gets threatened by his landlord and creditors that if he does not pay them on time, he will be homeless. At the same time, chartered accountant Anand Pawar tries to cheer up his aspiring actress girlfriend Neha on her birthday. They go to a 5-star restaurant for her birthday. Raj meets Ratan at the restaurant. Ratan is the manager of famous Bollywood actor Aryan Kapoor, and Raj has come to see Ratan to sign a film deal with Aryan.

Raj and Ratan buy as much food as they can and put the bill on Anand, who cannot pay and is sent to jail. When he comes out, Anand is eager for revenge and sees Raj shoplifting. Raj goes over to Aryan and Ratan, and right when he gets the movie contract papers out, an inspector shows up and arrests Raj for shoplifting, which was recorded by Anand. Raj escapes from jail only to get attacked, and he is saved by Anand. Anand and Raj come up with a plan together to put money into a film and ensure it is a flop. They collect a lot of money and pretend to be rich and wealthy men to show off in front of Aryan, who signs the papers, and is onboarded for the film. Anand and Raj try to make the film as bad as they can to get their share of the money, but they don't know that each of them has a different plan.

They borrow money from a well-known gangster to finance the film. They use Neha for the actress role because Anand knows that with Neha in the film, it will definitely be a flop. While the movie is filming, they contact Asharraff to be the writer, who mixes up Sholay, Dilwale Dulhania Le Jayenge, Gadar, and Lagaan (in that order). At the premiere, the film is declared a "hit," and the assassins get ready to kill them both. When Raj is about to escape with the money, he finds that Anand has already looted all the money. Both, on the run, meet each other while looking for a hiding place, and both decide there is no better place to hide than jail itself. The two run in jail for making a fraud film and looting money. Once they come out of jail, the two embrace in friendship; Anand reunites with Neha in Aryan's presence, and everyone decides to make another film.

== Cast ==
- Kunal Khemu as Anand Pawar
- Paresh Rawal as Raj Chopra (Raj Ji)
- Sonu Sood as Aryan Kapoor / Veeru / Shivaswamy Muthuswamy Chinnaswamy Muralitharan / Aryan's duplicate 1 / Vijay Bol Bachchan / Ganesh Gonzales (4 times role)
- Soha Ali Khan as Neha Chattopadhyay / Chulbuli Basanti
- Dilip Joshi as Mama Nautanki
- Amit Bhatt as Mama's assistant
- Johnny Lever as Parvez / Ashraf Ali / Daku Rabbar Singh aka Gabbar Singh aka Daku Baba
- Asrani as Ratan Ji
- Hrishitaa Bhatt as Riya
- Amit Thakur as Rishikesh Bajaj
- Deepal Shaw as Lolo
- Razak Khan as Usman
- Madhav Moghe as Thakur Baldev Singh
- Madhav Rathod as sambha/Himesh Reshammiya

== Soundtrack ==
1. "Dhoondte Reh Jaaoge" – Sonu Nigam
2. "Pal Yeh Aane Wala Pal" – Neeraj Shridhar
3. "Salma-O-Salma" – Palash Sen
4. "I Am Falling in Love" – Wajid
5. "Nako-Re-Nako" – Wajid, Javed Ali
6. "Apne Ko Paisa Chahiye" – Wajid, Sowmya Raoh
7. "Instrumental" – Sajid

== Reception ==
Taran Adarsh of Bollywood Hungama gave the film 2 out of 5, writing, "On the whole, DHOONDTE REH JAOGE is silly, but quite funny. A film that offers laughter in the garb of mindless entertainment. It might just work with people who are looking for some time pass fun, without taxing the brains."

Shashi Baliga of Hindustan Times wrote, "The movie gets so progressively atrocious that after a point you're not sure what's spoof and what's not. And the climax is a complete howler, except that by then, you can't even laugh at the banality of it all." Patcy N of Rediff.com wrote, "While a good spoof may have been enjoyable, Dhoondhte is dull, slow and boring.
