= Nikhil–Vinay =

Indian music composer duo

- Born: Nikhil Kamath; Vinay Tiwari
- Genre: Film score
- Occupation: Composer
- Years active: 1991—2006
- Label: T-Series

Nikhil–Vinay are an Indian music director duo consisting of Nikhil Kamath and Vinay Tiwari. The duo were active in the Hindi film industry from 1991 until their split in 2006.

Nikhil and Vinay are both trained in classical music. Singer Anuradha Paudwal discovered the duo and recommended them to Gulshan Kumar, owner of T-Series music company, and director Chandra Barot, who signed them for the 1991 romantic film Pyar Bhara Dil. The song "Banke Kitab Teri" from the film became popular. The duo then went on to compose music for over 20 films. Their initial successes included Bewafa Sanam (1995), a film which was breakthrough for playback singer Sonu Nigam, English Babu Desi Mem (1996), Uff Yeh Mohabbat (1997) and Papa The Great (2000). The duo composed music for two of Sonu Nigam's successful music albums, Jaan (1999) and Yaad (2001). They went on to score music for Anubhav Sinha's box office success Tum Bin which included hit songs such as "Koi Fariyaad", "Chhoti Choti Raatein" and "Tumhare Siva". Some of their other successful ventures include Hum Tumhare Hain Sanam, Aapko Pehle Bhi Kahin Dekha Hai, Muskaan, Koi Mere Dil Mein Hai and Kuch Dil Ne Kaha. The duo have also been accused of plagiarism by Pakistani singer Faisal Latif.

The composer-duo have mostly worked for the music label T-Series. The duo have also composed for television serials such as Thoda Hai Thodeb Ki Zaroorat Hai and Ajeeb Daastan. The duo split in 2006 after being 15 years together.

== Selected discography ==
=== Music composer for albums ===
- Bewafa Sanam (1993)
- Jaanam (2000)
- Ishq Hua (2000)
- Yaad (2001)
- Uski Yaadon Mein Bewafa Sanam Vol-8 (2002)
- Bewafaai (2004)
- Phir Bewafaai (2007) (This Album is composed by Nikhil Kamath as a solo composer without his partner Vinay Tiwari and album is released by T-series)
- Woh Bewafa (2008) (This Album is composed by Nikhil Kamath as a solo composer without his partner Vinay Tiwari and album is released by T-series)
- Bewafaai ka Aalam (2010) (This Album is composed by Nikhil Kamath as a solo composer without his partner Vinay Tiwari and album is released by T-series)

=== Music directors for films ===
They worked as music directors for the following films:

- Pyar Bhara Dil (1991)
- Ganga Ka Vachan (1992)
- Yuhi Kabhi (1992)
- Chor Aur Chaand (1993)
- Dulaara (1994)
- Bewafa Sanam (1995) – 10 million sales
- English Babu Desi Mem (1996)
- Shohrat (1996)
- Uff! Yeh Mohabbat (1997)
- Agniputra (2000)
- Papa — The Great (2000)
- Tum Bin (2001) – 2 million sales
- Hum Tumhare Hain Sanam (2002) – 1.6 million sales
- Aapko Pehle Bhi Kahin Dekha Hai (2003)
- Insaaf: The Justice (2004)
- Love in Nepal (2004)
- Muskaan (2004)
- Yeh Lamhe Judaai Ke (2004)
- Kaun Hai Jo Sapno Mein Aaya (2004)
- Phir Milenge (2004)
- Bazaar (2004)
- Dil Bechara Pyaar Ka Maara (2004)
- Bad Friend (2005)
- Chehraa (2005)
- Zameer: The Fire Within (2005)
- Laila — A Mystery (2005)
- Koi Mere Dil Mein Hai (2005)
- Saathi — The Companion (2005)
- Topless (2005)
- Sitam (2005)
- Jaadu Sa Chal Gaya (2006)
- Love Ke Chakkar Mein (2006)
- Jaane Hoga Kya (2006)
- Deshdrohi (2008)
