= Jaane Hoga Kya =

2006 Indian science fiction film

- Official Movie Poster
- Directed by: Glen Barretto; Ankush Mohla
- Written by: Glen Barretto; Ankush Mohla; Kumar Dave; Girish Dhamija
- Produced by: Alok Shrivastava
- Starring: Aftab Shivdasani; Bipasha Basu; Rahul Dev
- Cinematography: Suhas Gujarati
- Edited by: Steven H. Bernard
- Music by: Nikhil-Vinay; Sajid–Wajid
- Production company: PK Arts Creations Films
- Distributed by: Eagle Entertainment
- Release date: 1 September 2006
- Running time: 138 minutes
- Country: India
- Language: Hindi
- Budget: ₹5.5 crore
- Box office: ₹2.85 crore

Jaane Hoga Kya (transl. Wonder What'll Happen) is a 2006 Indian Hindi-language science fiction film directed by Glen Barretto and Ankush Mohla. It stars Aftab Shivdasani, Bipasha Basu, Rahul Dev, Paresh Rawal, Tinnu Anand and Preeti Jhangiani. The film began production in 2003 and was released in India on 1 September 2006. It was a commercial failure.

== Plot ==
Siddharth (Aftab Shivdasani) is a scientist working on human cloning at a research facility. Two years earlier, his friend and colleague Sanjay died during a failed experiment. Despite the tragedy, Siddharth continues to believe in the project’s potential. However, at a presentation, his boss, Dr Krishnan (Paresh Rawal) and police officer Rathore (Rahul Dev) discourage him, concerned about the risks. Siddharth’s girlfriend, Aditi Chopra (Bipasha Basu), offers support, and her father (Tinu Anand) agrees to fund the project. This happens shortly after Siddharth receives an anonymous call from the police officer, who hints at assisting him without revealing his identity. However, Siddharth refuses.

With funding secured from Mr Chopra, Siddharth takes leave from work to set up a secret lab in an abandoned factory. Meanwhile, his home is searched, and he is chased by bikers, resulting in him hiding at the lab. The police start monitoring Aditi to find Siddharth. As he begins cloning experiments on rats, he experiences several failures, causing emotional distress.

Eventually, Siddharth successfully clones a rat, though it shows aggressive tendencies. When he tries to share the breakthrough with Aditi near a lake, the police pursue him, and he leaps off a cliff to escape. His body isn’t recovered.

The film reveals that Siddharth survived and is working on cloning himself. His clone — darker-skinned and more violent — emerges, but he thinks he has failed. The clone assaults a woman at a nightclub and frames Siddharth for the crime. Arrested and unable to prove the existence of the clone, Siddharth's claims are dismissed by the police.

The clone seduces his boss's daughter, Suchitra (Preeti), and gains access to the cloning research. Posing as Siddharth, he kills Dr Krishnan to steal the documents. Preeti later reveals she is pregnant with the clone’s child. Meanwhile, the clone confronts Siddharth in prison, declaring he intends to take over his life.

Siddharth tries to prove his innocence by leading the police to his lab, but the equipment is gone. It is revealed that Aditi is secretly working with the clone and monitoring the lab via CCTV. She persuades Siddharth to plead insanity for Dr Krishnan’s murder, and he is institutionalised. Officer Rathore, growing suspicious, discovers the truth about the clone and begins working with Siddharth.

A final confrontation unfolds in a forest, where Aditi reveals she blamed Siddharth for her brother Sanjay’s death and sought revenge by faking the relationship. Siddharth insists Sanjay entered the machine after he pleaded with him not to, and they ultimately decided who would participate in the experiment after a coin toss. Realising the clone has gone too far and that Siddharth may be innocent, Aditi protects Siddharth and is fatally shot.

The clone takes Siddharth to a warehouse filled with other clones, saying he wants to unleash them into the world. Officer Rathore arrives, and together they destroy the facility and kill the clone. In the epilogue, Siddharth and Suchitra prepare for the birth of their child, uncertain about its future.

== Cast ==
- Aftab Shivdasani in a dual role as
  - Siddharth Sardesai
  - Mannu Dada, the evil clone of Siddharth
- Bipasha Basu as Aditi Chopra
- Rahul Dev as Officer Rathore
- Paresh Rawal as Dr. Krishnan
- Preeti Jhangiani as Suchitra Krishnan
- Tinu Anand as Mr. Chopra
- Zarina Wahab as Mrs. Krishnan

== Soundtrack ==
#	Title	Singer(s)	Music director(s)	Lyricist(s)
1	"Bechaniyan Badhne Lagi"	Sukhwinder Singh, Sunidhi Chauhan	Sajid–Wajid	Jalees Rashid
2	"Kuchh To Hua Hai"	Abhijeet, Shreya Ghoshal	Nikhil-Vinay	Sameer Anjaan
3	"Teri Mast Mast Jawani"	Sukhwinder Singh, Mahalakshmi Iyer	Sajid–Wajid	Jalees Rashid
4	"Palkein Uthake Dekhiye"	Udit Narayan, Anuradha Paudwal	Nikhil-Vinay	Sameer Anjaan
5	"Dheere Dheere Dil Ko"	Udit Narayan, Anuradha Paudwal	Nikhil-Vinay	Sameer Anjaan
6	"Dil Dhak Dhak Karne Laga"	Shaan, Shaswati	Nikhil-Vinay	Sameer Anjaan

== Reception ==
Taran Adarsh of IndiaFM gave the film 1 star out of 5, writing "Directors Glen-Ankush are technically proficient and it shows in several well-filmed sequences. But the directors ought to know that it's the content that does the talking eventually, not striking frames and visuals. Musically, nothing to hum about. Frankly, it's the filming of the songs that stays with you more than the tunes. Cinematography is first-rate."
