= Daboo Malik =

Indian singer & composer

- Born: Israr Sardar Malik; 21 January 1963 (age 63); Mumbai, Maharashtra, India
- Other name: Daboo Sardar Malik
- Occupations: Music director, music composer, actor
- Known for: Tumko Na Bhool Paayenge; I Proud to Be an Indian
- Spouse: Jyothi Malik
- Children: Amaal Mallik, Armaan Malik
- Relatives: Sardar Malik (father); Anu Malik(brother); Abu Malik (brother); Hasrat Jaipuri (maternal uncle)

Israr Sardar "Daboo" Malik is an Indian music director, composer, singer, actor, and scriptwriter in the Indian Music Industry. Malik was born in Mumbai, Maharashtra, to the veteran music director Sardar Malik.

== Early life ==
Malik was born on 21 January 1963 in Bombay, the third son of music director Sardar Malik and Bilqis Begum, sister of lyricist Hasrat Jaipuri. He has two brothers, Bollywood music director Anu Malik and Abu Malik. Uncle Hasrat Jaipuri (Malik's mother's brother) was a famous lyricist whose work spans from the 1950s to the 1980s.

After Malik completed his Bachelor of Commerce at Narsee Monjee College, In Mumbai, he followed his family's tradition. Malik pursued various artistic roles, such as singing, acting, and assisting Anu in directing music.

== Career ==
=== Actor (1980s-1990s) ===
Daboo Malik was initially not interested in singing or composing music, preferring acting. In 1988, he pursued a small role of Devavratha in the TV series Mahabharat by B.R. Chopra, on DD National and furthered his career by acting in other movies such as, Beta Ho To Aisa, Tirangaa, Server Sundaram Gari Abbayi (Telugu) and Baazigar.

=== Musician (2000s-present) ===
In 2013, however, Malik switched to music—in an interview, he stated: "I was acting and unconsciously working on my inner talent of composing music. I realized I wasted a lot of time. I only wanted to pursue acting for stardom."

His first album as a solo music director, Yeh Zindagi ka Safar, was released in 2001. The following year, he composed his first song "Thoda Sa Pyaar Hua Hai" for Maine Dil Tujhko Diya, followed by more movie music such as Tumko Na Bhool Paayenge and Hum Tumhare Hain Sanam in 2002, I Proud to Be an Indian in 2004 and Kisaan in 2009.

Malik attributes the discovery of his talent as a music director, to Salim Khan. In a 2013 interview, Malik explained: "My meeting with Salim Khan is [sic] unforgettable. He found me similar to my dad's personality, and I sang for the first time in front of him. Salim told me right away that I'm born to become a composer. I get goosebumps even when I think about it now, as my conversation with Salim Khan changed everything, and my musical journey began."

In 2014, Malik further became both the composer and scriptwriter for a forthcoming musical thriller W., directed by Tarun Madan.

== Personal life ==
Daboo Malik is married to Jyothi Malik, They have two sons, Armaan Malik and Amaal Mallik. Both sons actively participate in the Bollywood industry. Armaan is a singer while Amaal is a music composer..

== Filmography ==
Malik has composed music for Bollywood films such as

- Yeh Zindagi Ka Safar (2001)
- Tumko Na Bhool Paayenge (2002)
- Maine Dil Tujhko Diya (2002)
- Hum Tumhare Hain Sanam (2002)
- Tumse Milke Wrong Number (2003)
- I Proud to Be an Indian (2004)
- Girlfriend (2004)
- Ab... Bas! (2004)
- Nehlle Pe Dehlla (2007)
- Kissan (2009)
- 3 Bachelors (2012)
- W (2014)
- Ekta (2019)

Malik has also acted in the following films:

- Tirangaa (1993) as Alok Verma
- Baazigar (1993) as Ravi Shukla, Seema's (Shilpa Shetty) college mate
- Beta Ho To Aisa (1994) as Ravi
- Server Sundaram Gari Abbayi (1995) (Telugu)
- Zordaar (1996) as Sudhir

== Discography ==
• By Daboo's MWM Entertainment LLP •

Year	Song	Composer(s)	Lyricist(s)	Artists
2020	Tu Hai Jahaan	Himself	Himself	Daboo Malik, Various artist
2020	Humko Unse	Himself	Not mentioned	Daboo Malik
2020	Na Bola Kotha	Himself	Lipi	Sriijiit
2020	Kuch Khwaab	Himself	Panchhi Jalonvi	Sunidhi Chauhan
2020	Kahi Swapna	Himself	Trineet Bros	Harshvardhan Wavre & Kasturi Wavre
2020	Main Jo Chala	Himself	Rashmi Virag	Daboo Malik
2021	Phir Shaam Aayi	Himself	Himself	Pawni Pandey
2021	Tum Yun Hi Kabhi	Amaal Mallik	Panchhi Jalonvi	Palak Muchhal

== See also ==
- List of Indian music families
- List of Indian film families
