= Jalees Sherwani =

Indian screenwriter and lyricist

Jalees Sherwani was an Indian screenwriter and lyricist. His first writing credit (for dialogue) was the 1988 film Kanwarlal, which starred Jeetendra. He died in 2018.

== Filmography ==
- Pratighat (1987) (dialogue)
- Kanwarlal (1988) (dialogue)
- Hatyare (1989) (dialogue)
- Sangram (1993) (dialogue)
- Game (1993) (dialogue)
- Ishq Mein Jeena Ishq Mein Marna (1994) (dialogue)
- Anokha Andaaz (1995) (dialogue / story and screenplay)
- Ek Tha Raja (1996) (dialogue)
- Mafia (1996) (dialogue)
- Loafer (1996) (dialogue)
- Bhoot Bhungla (1997)
- Mrityudaata (1997) (dialogue)
- Hafta Vasuli (1998) (dialogue)
- Aakrosh: Cyclone of Anger (1998) (dialogues)
- Baaghi (2000) (dialogue)
- The Truth... Yathharth
- Tez-New Movie (2002) (dialogue / story and screenplay)
- Inteqam: The Perfect Game (2004) (dialogue + lyrics)
- Chand Sa Roshan Chehra (2005)
- Partner (2007) (lyrics)
- Hello (2008) (lyrics)
- Dhoondte Reh Jaoge (2009) (lyrics)
- Paying Guests (2009) (lyrics)
- "Mitti" (2001) (lyrics)
- "Kya Yehi Pyar Hai" (2001) (lyrics)
- "Tumko Na Bhool Payenge" (lyrics)
- "Main Ne Dil Tujhko Diya" (lyrics)
- "Mashooka" (lyrics)
- "Hum Tumhare Hain Sanam" (lyrics)
- "Garv" (lyrics)
- The Killer (lyrics)
- Say Yes to love (lyrics)
- " Kuch Kaha Aapne" (lyrics)
- "Shadi Karke Phans Gaya" (lyrics)
- "Mujhse Shaadi Karogi" (lyrics)
- "Tere Naam" (lyrics)
- "Zindagi Tere Naam (lyrics)
- "Heroes" (lyrics)
- "Hello Brother" (lyrics)
- Wanted (2009) (lyrics)
- Main Aurr Mrs Khanna (2009) (lyrics)
- Dabangg (2010) (lyrics)
- Dabangg 2 (2012) (lyrics)
- Chashme Badoor (2013) (lyrics)
- Dabangg 3 (2019) (lyrics)

== Other Credits ==
- 2014 - 2016 - President of Film Writers' Association
- 2008-12 - President of Film Writers' Association
- 1990-93 - General Secretary of Film Writers' Association

== Social Activist ==
Jalees Sherwani was also a social activist, he was president of Film Writers' Association and a member of Progressive Foundation, FWA, Press Club of India. He was jury member of many shows.

== Accolades ==
Year	Award Ceremony	Category	Film	Song	Result	Reference(s)
2010	Mirchi Music Awards	Album of The Year	Dabangg	-	Won	
