= Dia Mirza =

Indian actress and producer (born 1981)

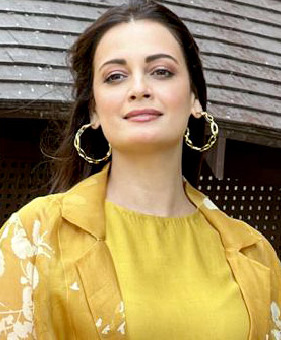
- Mirza in 2023
- Born: Dia Handrich; 9 December 1981 (age 44); Hyderabad, Andhra Pradesh (now in Telangana, India)
- Occupations: Actress; producer
- Years active: 1999–present
- Title: Miss Asia Pacific International 2000; Femina Miss India Asia Pacific 2000
- Spouses: Sahil Sangha (m. 2014; div. 2019) Vaibhav Rekhi (m. 2021)
- Children: 2

Dia Mirza Rekhi (born Dia Handrich; 9 December 1981) is an Indian actress who primarily works in Hindi films. She won the title of Miss Asia Pacific International in 2000 after being crowned Femina Miss India Asia Pacific 2000. Mirza made her acting debut with the Hindi film Rehnaa Hai Terre Dil Mein (2001).

Mirza went onto featured in films including Dus (2005), Lage Raho Munna Bhai (2006), Honeymoon Travels Pvt. Ltd. (2007), Shootout at Lokhandwala (2007), Kurbaan (2009), Sanju (2018) and Thappad (2020), with Sanju being her highest grossing release. She co-owned a production house, Born Free Entertainment, with her ex-husband Sahil Sangha. After their divorce, she launched her own production house, One India Stories, in 2019. She has since starred in the streaming series Kaafir (2019) and IC 814: The Kandahar Hijack (2024).

== Early life and work ==
Mirza was born on 9 December 1981, in Hyderabad. Her father, Frank Handrich, is a German graphics and industrial fair designer, architect, artist and interior designer based in Munich. Her mother, Deepa, is a Bengali interior designer and landscaper who also volunteers to help alcoholics and drug addicts. When she was four-and-a-half years old, her parents divorced. After her mother married Ahmed Mirza, a Muslim man from Hyderabad, she adopted her step-father's surname. He died in 2003.

After initially attending Vidyaranya High School, a co-ed school, Mirza was enrolled into Nasr School, a girl's day school in Khairtabad. She then attended Stanley Junior College before graduating with a Bachelor of Arts from Ambedkar Open University, Hyderabad.

Mirza worked while in college as a marketing executive for a media firm, Neeraj's Multi-media Studio. At the same time, she modelled for print and TV commercials for brands such as Lipton, Wall's ice cream, Emami and many more.

== Pageantry ==
Mirza was the second runner-up at Femina Miss India 2000 and was subsequently sent to Miss Asia Pacific 2000, where she won. She also won Miss Beautiful Smile, Miss Avon and Miss Close-Up Smile in Miss India. When she won the Miss Asia Pacific title on 3 December 2000 in Manila, the Philippines, she became the first Indian since Tara Anne Fonseca to win this title in 27 years. She completed the hat-trick of India winning international pageants in the year 2000; Lara Dutta won the Miss Universe title and Priyanka Chopra won the Miss World title in the same year.

== Acting career ==
Following an uncredited appearance in the Tamil film En Swasa Kaatre (1999), Mirza made her acting debut in 2001 with Gautham Vasudev Menon's Rehnaa Hai Terre Dil Mein, a remake of Menon's Tamil film Minnale. She played Reena Malhotra opposite R. Madhavan and Saif Ali Khan. The film was a box office failure but later gained cult status and was a success upon its re-release. Her performance earned her nomination for Filmfare Award for Best Female Debut, but Taran Adarsh noted, "Dia looks like a doll and goes through the mandatory dance movements gracefully, but needs to polish her acting skills."

In 2001, she also appeared opposite Arjun Rampal in Deewaanapan,a box office failure. All her subsequent releases were commercially unsuccessful, including: Tumko Na Bhool Paayenge opposite Salman Khan (2002), Dum opposite Vivek Oberoi (2003), Praan Jaye Par Shaan Na Jaye (2003), Tehzeeb (2003), Kyun! Ho Gaya Na... (2004), Tumsa Nahin Dekha: A Love Story opposite Emraan Hashmi (2004), Stop! (2004), Blackmail (2005), Naam Gum Jaayega (2005) and Koi Mere Dil Mein Hai (2005).

Mirza found commercial success with her last two releases of 2005 Parineeta and Dus. In Dus, she played one of the leads opposite Zayed Khan. It emerged as one of the highest grossing film of the year. In 2006, she appeared in Fight Club – Members Only and Alag. That year, she played a businessman's daughter opposite Abhishek Bachchan in Lage Raho Munna Bhai. The film emerged as the third highest grossing film of the year. Mirza had four releases in 2007. She first played a Gujarati woman who eloped with her lover in Honeymoon Travels Pvt. Ltd. opposite Arjun Rampal and Ranvir Shorey. Despite positive reviews, it was a box office average. Sudhish Kamath of The Hindu was appreciative of her look and performance. She then played a journalist in Shootout at Lokhandwala, another box office success. She then appeared in Cash and Dus Kahaniyaan opposite Manoj Bajpayee.

This success was followed by a career downturn when all her films were critical and commercial failure. It includes: Krazzy 4 (2008), Jai Veeru (2009), Kisaan (2009), Acid Factory (2009), Fruit and Nut (2009), Kurbaan (2009), Hum Tum Aur Ghost (2010) and Love Breakups Zindagi (2011). In Kurbaan, she played a television journalist opposite Vivek Oberoi. Taran Adarsh felt that she lends "credibility" to her brief role. In 2012, she appeared in the Bengali film Paanch Adhyay, which was a commercial success and her performance was better received. After a four year hiatus, Mirza appeared in the Iranian-Indian film Salaam Mumbai opposite Mohammad Reza Golzar. It was a success at the box office.

Mirza played Sanjay Dutt's wife Manyata Dutt in the 2018 biopic Sanju opposite Ranbir Kapoor. A critical and commercial success, it emerged as one of the highest grossing Indian films. Devesh Sharma of Filmfare stated, "Dia doesn't have a lengthy role but make sure she adds to the film." In 2020, she appeared in Thappad, which went on to win the Filmfare Award for Best Film. She appeared in the ZEE5 web series Kaafir in 2019. Set in Kashmir, she starred opposite Mohit Raina in the series. She is now set to star in the web-series Dr. Hassan, a remake of the television series House.

=== Producer ===
In 2011, she started Born Free Entertainment, a production house with her ex-husband Sahil Sangha. She has also produced Love Breakups Zindagi, Bobby Jasoos and a sitcom web series titled Mind the Malhotras (2019), streaming on Amazon Prime Video. The series stars Cyrus Sahukar and Mini Mathur in the lead. In December 2019 she announced she was forming a new production house "One India Stories" to create original content.

In 2025, Mirza co-produced the Marathi short film Panha through One India Stories, alongside Ananya Rane. The film follows a family of mango farmers facing displacement from their ancestral land due to a development project. It won the Best Indian Short Film award at the 2025 All Living Things Environmental Film Festival.

== Community services, activism and controversy ==
Mirza has been involved with the Cancer Patients Aid Association and Spastics Society of India, and has worked extensively with the government of Andhra Pradesh to spread HIV awareness, prevention of female foeticide, PETA, CRY and most recently the NDTV Greenathon – an effort to find tangible solutions against pollution and the book, "Deke Dheko" by Radio Mirchi (a campaign initiated to collect books for underprivileged children). She is on the board of the Coca-Cola Foundation which works towards development in rural India. She is associated with campaigns such as Sanctuary Asia's Leave Me Alone and Female Foeticide.

In 2010 she adopted two cheetah cubs at the Prince of Wales zoological park in Lucknow. Mirza, along with Aamir Khan, publicly expressed support for the Narmada Bachao Andolan, a group protesting the building of a dam. This aroused the ire of political activists from the Bharatiya Janata Party, who led a protest march against the actress. She won the Green Award at IIFA 2012 for spreading awareness about environment-related issues. Along with these, Mirza has endorsed The Body Shop for their stand on a ban on animal testing and propagation of recycled packaging and natural products.

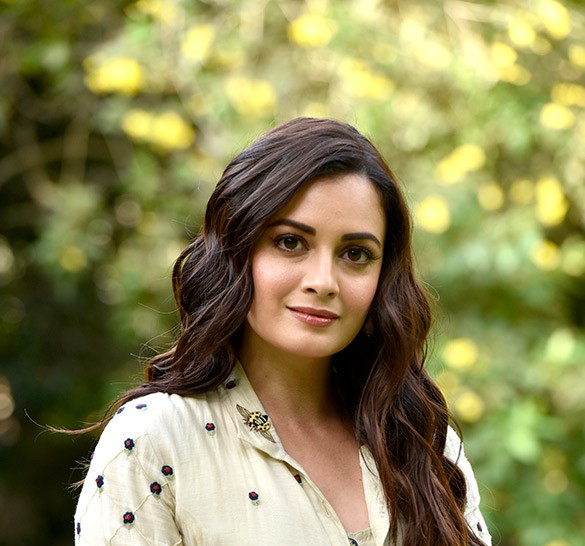
Mirza at an event for World Environment Day in 2018

Mirza has been felicitated at award functions for her active involvement in social and environmental issues. She has been named the ambassador for the Swachh Bharat Mission's youth-based 'Swachh Saathi' programme. As an ambassador, the actress would interact with school and college students from across the country through awareness sessions, community cleaning activities and motivational videos. She joined Save The Children India as their first-ever artist ambassador.

On World Environment Day 2017, she was appointed brand ambassador for the Wildlife Trust of India. She has lent her support to WTI's wildlife conservation endeavours for several years and is a founder-member of the organisation's Club Nature initiative, also supporting a campaign to raise awareness about the shrinking space for wild elephants in the country.

She was also appointed as the UN Environment's Goodwill Ambassador for India in 2017 and on 7 May 2020, her term was further extended till 2022. She was appointed by the Secretary-General of the United Nations as an advocate of Sustainable Development Goals. She also turned into a blogger to save the environment and create awareness. She hosted United Nations Champions Gala 2019 with Hollywood actor Alec Baldwin. She attended the 14th UN Conference of the Parties and hosted the finale reception.

Mirza initiated a cleanliness drive at Juhu beach on Independence Day 2019 and another at Mahim beach on 26 January, to make the beach free from single-use plastic. Mirza supports Ramky's BIG Green Ganesha and felicitated the winners with Tree Ganeshas in 2019. She has also been featured by the British Broadcasting Corporation (BBC) in its 11th edition of BBC 100 Women List 2023, listing her as one of the four Indian women featured. Mirza lent her voice to a snow leopard called Layla for an environmental podcast of Run Wild, which is a collaboration between Runtastic, the UN Environmental Programme and the Internet of Elephants.

In November 2026, the Brihanmumbai Municipal Corporation (BMC) removed an anti-firecracker Diwali awareness video featuring Mirza from its social media accounts following objections from a political party. The video formed part of a municipal campaign against air and noise pollution following directions from the Bombay High Court. Similar campaign videos featuring other public figures remained online. Mirza defended her participation, stating that the appeal was intended to promote public health and encourage environmentally responsible celebrations.The Bombay High Court directed the BMC to reupload the video on learning of its deletion.

== Personal life ==
In April 2014, Mirza became engaged to her longtime business partner Sahil Sangha, and they were married on 18 October 2014 at his farmhouse in Chhatarpur, South Delhi. In August 2019, Mirza announced their separation.

On 15 February 2021, Mirza married businessman Vaibhav Rekhi in Bandra, Mumbai.

On 14 July 2021, Mirza announced that she had a premature birth of a baby boy, Avyaan Azaad Rekhi on 14 May and he was in NICU for 2 months. She also has a step-daughter, Samaira Rekhi from Vaibhav Rekhi's previous marriage.

== Media image ==
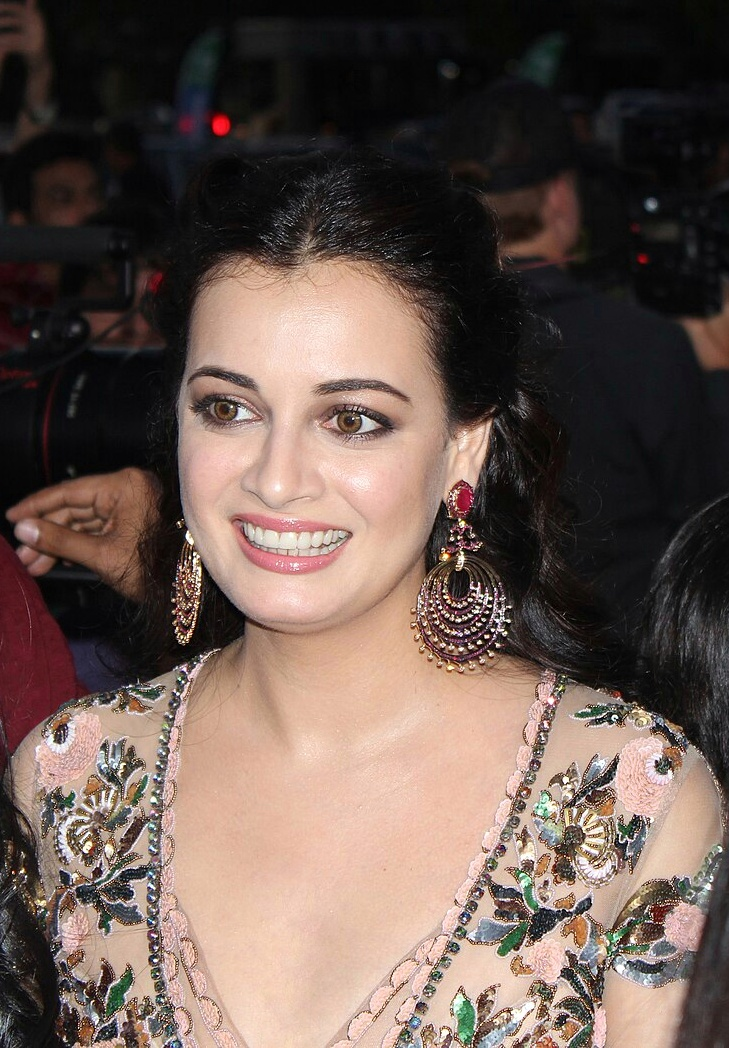
Mirza in 2017

In the Times Most Desirable Women list, Mirza was placed 14th in 2009, 24th in 2010 25th in 2011 and 35th in 2012. Mirza was also placed in Femina's "50 Most Beautiful Women" list. Times of India placed her at 15th position in its "50 Beautiful Faces" list. Mirza has written articles for Hindustan Times and other publications.

== Filmography ==
Key
†	Denotes films that have not yet been released

=== Films ===
Year	Title	Role	Notes
1999	En Swasa Kaatre	Dancer	Tamil film; Extra in the song "Jumbalakka"
2001	Rehnaa Hai Terre Dil Mein	Reena Malhotra	
2001	Deewaanapan	Kiran Choudhary	
2002	Tumko Na Bhool Paayenge	Muskaan	
2003	Dum	Kaveri	
2003	Praan Jaye Par Shaan Na Jaye	Saundarya	
2003	Tehzeeb	Nazneen Jamal	
2004	Kyun! Ho Gaya Na...	Preeti Jaiswal	Special appearance
2004	Tumsa Nahin Dekha: A Love Story	Jiya	
2004	Stop!	Shama	
2005	Blackmail	Anjali Mohan	
2005	My Brother...Nikhil	Herself	Special appearance
2005	Naam Gum Jaayega	Natasha / Gitanjali	
2005	Koi Mere Dil Mein Hai	Simran	
2005	Parineeta	Gayatri	
2005	Dus	Anu Dheer	
2006	Fight Club: Members Only	Anu Chopra	
2006	Prateeksha	Reena Brown	Television film
2006	Phir Hera Pheri	Item Dancer	Special appearance
2006	Alag	Purva Rana	
2006	Lage Raho Munna Bhai	Simran	
2007	Honeymoon Travels Pvt. Ltd.	Shilpa	
2007	Shootout at Lokhandwala	Meeta Mattoo	
2007	Cash	Aditi Jhamwal	
2007	Heyy Babyy	Herself	Cameo
2007	Om Shanti Om	Herself	Cameo
2007	Dus Kahaniyaan	Sia	Anthology film; segment: Zahir
2008	Krazzy 4	Shikha	
2009	Luck by Chance	Herself	Special appearance
2009	Jai Veeru	Anna	
2009	Kisaan	Priya	
2009	Acid Factory	Max	
2009	Fruit and Nut	Monica Gokhale	
2009	Kurbaan	Rehana	Special appearance
2010	Hum Tum Aur Ghost	Gehna Sinha	
2011	Love Breakups Zindagi	Naina	
2012	Paanch Adhyay	Ishita	Bengali film
2014	Bobby Jasoos	–	Producer
2014	Familywala	Anjali	
2016	Salaam Mumbai	Karishma	Iranian-Indian film
2018	Sanju	Manyata Dutt	
2020	Thappad	Shivani	
2021	Wild Dog	Priya Verma	Telugu film
2023	Bheed	Geetanjali	
2023	Dhak Dhak	Uzma	
2025	Nadaaniyan	Nandini Mehta	
2026	Alpha	Janaki	Special appearance
2026	Ikka	Avantika Mehra	Netflix film

=== Television ===
Year	Title	Role	Notes	Ref.
2016	Ganga – The Soul Of India	Herself		
2019	Kaafir	Kainaaz Akhtar		
2019	Mind the Malhotras	Herself	Producer	
2021	Call My Agent: Bollywood	Herself	Episode 1	
2023	Made in Heaven	Shehnaz	Season 2	
2024	IC 814: The Kandahar Hijack	Shalini "Sha" Chandra		
2026	Operation Safed Sagar	Kamalpreet Dhanoa	Wife of Tony Dhanoa	

=== Music video appearances ===
Year	Title	Performer(s)	Role	Album	Ref.
2004	"Pal Do Pal Pyar Ka"	Adnan Sami	Unnamed	Teri Kasam	

=== Narrator ===
Year	Title	Film By
2022	No Water No Viilage	Munmun Dalaria
2025	The Dooars World	Shaon Pretam

== Awards and nominations ==
=== Film awards ===
Won

- 2003: Bollywood Movie Award for Best Female Debut for Rehnaa Hai Terre Dil Mein.
- 2003: Zee Cine Award for Best Female Debut for Rehnaa Hai Terre Dil Mein.
- 2019: Gold Award for Best Actress Critics – OTT for Kaafir.

Nominated

- 2003: Filmfare Award for Best Female Debut for Rehnaa Hai Terre Dil Mein.
- 2003: Screen Award for Best Female Debut for Rehnaa Hai Terre Dil Mein and Deewaanapan.
- 2011: BIG Star Most Entertaining Award for Actress in a Romantic Role for Love Breakups Zindagi.

=== Other recognitions ===
- 2012: IIFA outstanding contribution to Environment.
- 2022: Mirza was honoured with Mother Teresa Memorial Award by the Governor of Maharashtra.
- 2023: Mirza was named by BBC in its 100 Women list (One of the world's inspiring and influential women).
- 2024: Iconic Gold Award for Environmentalist of the Year.
- 2024: Wildlife Advocate of the Year award at the 24th Animal Action Awards, organised by the International Fund for Animal Welfare (IFAW) in London, in recognition of her contributions to wildlife conservation in India.

Awards and achievements
Preceded by (Colombia) Juliana Andrea Arango	Miss Asia Pacific International; 1999	Succeeded by (Peru) Luciana Luisa Farfán

Awards and achievements
Preceded by Juliana Andrea Arango Londoño	Miss Asia Pacific 2000; 2000	Succeeded by Luciana Luisa Farfán Vargas
Preceded by Shivangi Parikkh	Femina Miss India; 2000	Succeeded by Maheshwari
