= Richa Pallod =

Indian model and actress

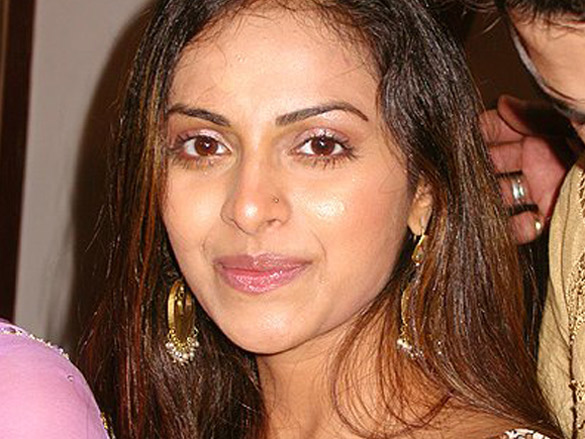
- Richa Pallod in 2016
- Born: Bangalore, Karnataka, India
- Occupations: Actress; model; voice artist
- Years active: 2000–2020
- Spouse: Himanshu Bajaj (m. 2011)
- Children: 1 son

Richa Pallod is an Indian model and actress who appears in films of 5 languages, predominantly in Hindi, Telugu, and Tamil films. She has also been featured in Kannada and Malayalam language films. After appearing as a child artiste in Lamhe (1991), she appeared in Nuvve Kavali (2000), her first film in Telugu.

Her most notable Hindi film is Yash Raj Films' Neal 'n' Nikki (2005). Her roles in Tamil films Shahjahan (2001) and Unakkum Enakkum (2006) are noted whilst she has also featured in Kannada and Malayalam language films.

== Personal life ==
She married Himanshu Bajaj, sometime around 2011 and their son was born around 2013.

== Career ==
Richa Pallod made her entry into films with a minute role as a child artiste in the film Lamhe (1991) and Pardes (1997). She started modelling at the age of 16, has featured in over five hundred commercials and appeared in Falguni Pathak's music videos "Yaad Piya Ki Aane Lagi" and "Piya Se Mil Ke Aaye Nain". Richa made her film debut in the Telugu film, Nuvve Kavali (2000), opposite Tarun, whom she had previously appeared with in a commercial shot by Rajiv Menon. The film, which portrayed love between two childhood friends in college, became a huge commercial success and won favourable reviews with claims that Richa "did not seem like a debutant" in her role. Her performance in the film won her the Filmfare Award for Best Actress – Telugu.

She made her debut in Tamil cinema, playing the lead role opposite Vijay in Shajahan. The film was appreciated by critics and Richa's performance was noted to have "done little good". Her second Tamil film was Alli Arjuna, directed by noted film maker Saran featuring Manoj Bharathiraja. Richa played the role of an independent girl being romantically pursued by Manoj, but once again received unfavourable reviews with reviewers citing that "you do not feel for Richa".

Her first Hindi film as a lead artiste was opposite Fardeen Khan in Kuch Tum Kaho Kuch Hum Kahein, a critical and commercial failure. Richa claimed that the lack of promotion of the project might have been the reason for the dull response towards the film. Her subsequent Hindi films within the next two years, including two films opposite actor Rakesh Bapat, were low-budget projects and did not fare well at the box office. Similarly, her projects in Kannada, Cheppale and Jootata, opposite Sameer Dattani also failed commercially, with reviews criticising Richa's performance in the latter. Richa went on to appear in Yash Raj Films' Neal 'n' Nikki, featuring Uday Chopra and Tanishaa Mukerji, playing the role of Sweety. After several of her previous ventures failed to succeed, Richa appeared in a supporting role in Unakkum Enakkum (2006).

Richa went on to claim that poor public relations and lack of promotion led to her disappearance from films before returning in 2009, with her first appearance in a Malayalam film in the Mammootty-starrer, Daddy Cool. Playing the role of Annie Simon, mother of an eight-year-old, her role won critical acclaim and the film was a commercial success. In 2010, she appeared in the Telugu language film, Inkosaari alongside Raja and Manjari Phadnis. However, the film failed to succeed commercially as it was released alongside the hit film, Ye Maaya Chesaave, which went on to attract more viewers. Towards the end of her career as a lead actress, Richa featured in the making of two low-budget unreleased Tamil films, Nalvaravu and Kadhal Kalvan. In 2011, she was chosen to be one of the Hindi-dubbing artistes for the Hindi dubbed version of the Hollywood film, X-Men: First Class, when it was released in theatres, shortly after its North American release, dubbing for Rose Byrne's role as Moira MacTaggert.

Richa took a sabbatical from acting for a few years after her wedding, before appearing in Yagavarayinum Naa Kaakka / Malupu (2015) in a supporting role.

== Filmography ==
=== Films ===
| Year | Film | Role | language | Notes |
|---|---|---|---|---|
| 1991 | Lamhe | Pooja | Hindi | Child artist |
| 1997 | Pardes | | Hindi | Child artist |
| 2000 | Nuvve Kavali | Madhu | Telugu | Won - Filmfare Award for Best Actress – Telugu |
| 2001 | Chirujallu | Radhika | Telugu | |
| 2001 | Prematho Raa | Swapna | Telugu | Cameo appearance |
| 2001 | Shahjahan | Uma Mageshwari "Magi" | Tamil | |
| 2002 | Alli Arjuna | Savithri | Tamil | |
| 2002 | Kuch Tum Kaho Kuch Hum Kahein | Mangala Solanki | Hindi | |
| 2002 | Holi | Sandhya | Telugu | |
| 2002 | Naa Manasistha Raa | Seershika | Telugu | |
| 2003 | Tumse Milke Wrong Number | Mahi Mathur | Hindi | |
| 2003 | Kadhal Kirukkan | Maha | Tamil | |
| 2004 | Agnipankh | Surbhi | Hindi | |
| 2004 | Kaun Hai Jo Sapno Mein Aaya | Mahek | Hindi | |
| 2004 | Chappale | Janaki | Kannada | |
| 2005 | Pellam Pichodu | Priya | Telugu | |
| 2005 | Neal 'n' Nikki | Sweety | Hindi | |
| 2005 | Jootata | Nandini | Kannada | |
| 2006 | Something Something ... Unakkum Enakkum | Lalitha | Tamil | |
| 2008 | Rab Ne Bana Di Jodi | Dance Instructor | Hindi | |
| 2009 | Daddy Cool | Annie Simon | Malayalam | |
| 2010 | Inkosaari | Deepa | Telugu | |
| 2011 | Tell Me O Kkhuda | Simi | Hindi | |
| 2015 | Yagavarayinum Naa Kaakka | Priya | Tamil | Bilingual film |
| 2016 | Malupu | Priya | Telugu | Bilingual film |

=== Television ===
| Year | Series | Role | language |
|---|---|---|---|
| 2012 | Ramleela – Ajay Devgn Ke Saath | Sita | Hindi |
| 2018 | Khan No.1 | Tarini Bhatt | Hindi |
| 2020 | Laal Ishq | Pisachini Kaya | Hindi |

=== Web series ===
| Year | Series | Role | language | Network | Notes |
|---|---|---|---|---|---|
| 2020 | Your Honor | Indu Samthar | Hindi | SonyLIV | |

== Dubbing roles ==
=== Live action films ===
| Film Title | Actress | Character | Dub Language | Original Language | Original Year Release | Dub Year Release | Notes |
|---|---|---|---|---|---|---|---|
| X-Men: First Class | Rose Byrne | Moira MacTaggert | Hindi | English | 2011 | 2011 | |
| Fantastic Four (2015 film) | Kate Mara | Susan Storm | Hindi | English | 2015 | 2015 | |
