= Payam Salehi =

Iranian singer & guitarist (born 1975)

Payam Salehi پیام صالحی
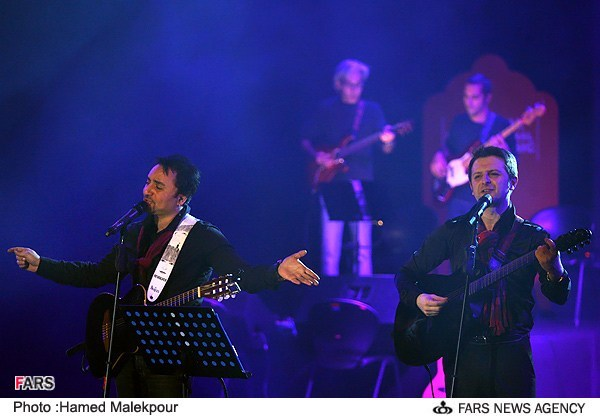
- Payam Salehi and Ali Pahlavan are the main members of Arian's group performing the concert

Background information
- Born: March 12, 1975 (age 51); Tehran, Iran
- Occupations: Singer, guitarist
- Member of: Arian

Payam Salehi (Persian: پیام صالحی; born March 12, 1975) is an Iranian singer and guitarist, and is a founder and main member of the band Arian.

== Biography ==
Encouraged by his parents, he turned to music and learned to play the santur with Azita Hajian as a child. After learning the santur, he turned to guitar and piano. Together with Ali Pahlavan, he formed Arian, which was originally a traditional music group.

Mohammad Reza Golzar was once the guitarist of Arian, but later left the group. A few years after the end of Arian's activity, he performed the parvaz piece in a concert in the United States with Payam Salehi, which caused dissatisfaction between Ali Pahlavan and Arian's agents, because the single was performed without the permission of the band members at the concert.

== Discography ==
Albums

Released September 2010

Hess, Tasvir Donyaye Honar
Name	Songwriter	Composer	Arrangement	Notes
"Hess 1 (Bia)"	Sohrab Pakzad	Sohrab Pakzad	Nima Varasteh	Mix & Mastring, Keyboard, Piano and violin : Nima Varasteh Classical Guitar : Payam Salehi & Amir Tabari Electric guitar : Masoud Homayouni Music engineer : Ali Hosseinzadeh Recorded at Rusk Sound Studios and Avalin Khaneye Honar Studios
"Vase To"	Shahin Tick	Shahin Tick	Nima Varasteh	Mix & Mastring, Keyboard, Piano and violin : Nima Varasteh Classical Guitar : Payam Salehi & Amir Tabari Electric guitar : Masoud Homayouni Music engineer : Ali Hosseinzadeh Recorded at Rusk Sound Studios and Avalin Khaneye Honar Studios
"Hess"	Shahin Tick	Shahin Tick	Nima Varasteh	Mix & Mastring, Keyboard, Piano and violin : Nima Varasteh Classical Guitar : Payam Salehi & Amir Tabari Electric guitar : Masoud Homayouni Music engineer : Ali Hosseinzadeh Recorded at Rusk Sound Studios and Avalin Khaneye Honar Studios
"To Rast Migofti"	Ali Hosseinzadeh	Ali Hosseinzadeh	Nima Varasteh	Mix & Mastring, Keyboard, Piano and violin : Nima Varasteh Classical Guitar : Payam Salehi & Amir Tabari Electric guitar : Masoud Homayouni Music engineer : Ali Hosseinzadeh Recorded at Rusk Sound Studios and Avalin Khaneye Honar Studios
"Ghalbam Mige"	Ali Hosseinzadeh	Ali Hosseinzadeh	Nima Varasteh	Mix & Mastring, Keyboard, Piano and violin : Nima Varasteh Classical Guitar : Payam Salehi & Amir Tabari Electric guitar : Masoud Homayouni Music engineer : Ali Hosseinzadeh Recorded at Rusk Sound Studios and Avalin Khaneye Honar Studios
"Saheb Khane"	Ali Hosseinzadeh	Ali Hosseinzadeh	Nima Varasteh	Mix & Mastring, Keyboard, Piano and violin : Nima Varasteh Classical Guitar : Payam Salehi & Amir Tabari Electric guitar : Masoud Homayouni Music engineer : Ali Hosseinzadeh Recorded at Rusk Sound Studios and Avalin Khaneye Honar Studios
"Dasthaye Khali"	Hamid Askari	Hamid Askari	Nima Varasteh	Mix & Mastring, Keyboard, Piano and violin : Nima Varasteh Classical Guitar : Payam Salehi & Amir Tabari Electric guitar : Masoud Homayouni Music engineer : Ali Hosseinzadeh Recorded at Rusk Sound Studios and Avalin Khaneye Honar Studios
"Saze Shekaste"	Hamid Askari	Hamid Askari	Nima Varasteh	Mix & Mastring, Keyboard, Piano and violin : Nima Varasteh Classical Guitar : Payam Salehi & Amir Tabari Electric guitar : Masoud Homayouni Music engineer : Ali Hosseinzadeh Recorded at Rusk Sound Studios and Avalin Khaneye Honar Studios

Released September 2015

Barmigardam, Honar Aval
Name	Songwriter	Composer	Arrangement	Notes
"Ba Man Bia"	Yaha Kashani	Sina Shabankhani	Hamed Baradaran	Accordion: Firouz Veysanlou Bouzouki: Behnam Hakim Classical guitar: Hamed Baradaran, Kian Darat, Payam Salehi, Firouz Veysanlou Electric guitar: Masoud Homayouni Percussion: Mehran Farshbaf Saxophone: Hooman Namdari Violone: Ashkan Mousavi and Payam Toni Background vocals: Sahra Birang and Sharareh Farnejad
"Chera Nadaramet"	Yaha Kashani	Payam Salehi	Hamed Baradaran	Accordion: Firouz Veysanlou Bouzouki: Behnam Hakim Classical guitar: Hamed Baradaran, Kian Darat, Payam Salehi, Firouz Veysanlou Electric guitar: Masoud Homayouni Percussion: Mehran Farshbaf Saxophone: Hooman Namdari Violone: Ashkan Mousavi and Payam Toni Background vocals: Sahra Birang and Sharareh Farnejad
"Hava Laj Kardeh"	Mehrzad Amirkhani	Milad Torabi	Milad Torabi	Accordion: Firouz Veysanlou Bouzouki: Behnam Hakim Classical guitar: Hamed Baradaran, Kian Darat, Payam Salehi, Firouz Veysanlou Electric guitar: Masoud Homayouni Percussion: Mehran Farshbaf Saxophone: Hooman Namdari Violone: Ashkan Mousavi and Payam Toni Background vocals: Sahra Birang and Sharareh Farnejad
"Yekam Fekr Kon"	Yaha Kashani	Payam Salehi	Anooshirvan Taghavi	Accordion: Firouz Veysanlou Bouzouki: Behnam Hakim Classical guitar: Hamed Baradaran, Kian Darat, Payam Salehi, Firouz Veysanlou Electric guitar: Masoud Homayouni Percussion: Mehran Farshbaf Saxophone: Hooman Namdari Violone: Ashkan Mousavi and Payam Toni Background vocals: Sahra Birang and Sharareh Farnejad
"Aroom Begir"	Yaha Kashani	Payam Houshmand	Payam Houshmand	Accordion: Firouz Veysanlou Bouzouki: Behnam Hakim Classical guitar: Hamed Baradaran, Kian Darat, Payam Salehi, Firouz Veysanlou Electric guitar: Masoud Homayouni Percussion: Mehran Farshbaf Saxophone: Hooman Namdari Violone: Ashkan Mousavi and Payam Toni Background vocals: Sahra Birang and Sharareh Farnejad
"Divoonegi"	Yaha Kashani	Payam Salehi	Anooshirvan Taghavi	Accordion: Firouz Veysanlou Bouzouki: Behnam Hakim Classical guitar: Hamed Baradaran, Kian Darat, Payam Salehi, Firouz Veysanlou Electric guitar: Masoud Homayouni Percussion: Mehran Farshbaf Saxophone: Hooman Namdari Violone: Ashkan Mousavi and Payam Toni Background vocals: Sahra Birang and Sharareh Farnejad
"Sayeh"	Yaha Kashani	Mahan Bahramkhan	Anooshirvan Taghavi	Accordion: Firouz Veysanlou Bouzouki: Behnam Hakim Classical guitar: Hamed Baradaran, Kian Darat, Payam Salehi, Firouz Veysanlou Electric guitar: Masoud Homayouni Percussion: Mehran Farshbaf Saxophone: Hooman Namdari Violone: Ashkan Mousavi and Payam Toni Background vocals: Sahra Birang and Sharareh Farnejad
"Hanooz Yeki Hast"	Yaha Kashani	Yaha Kashani	Kooshan Haddad	Accordion: Firouz Veysanlou Bouzouki: Behnam Hakim Classical guitar: Hamed Baradaran, Kian Darat, Payam Salehi, Firouz Veysanlou Electric guitar: Masoud Homayouni Percussion: Mehran Farshbaf Saxophone: Hooman Namdari Violone: Ashkan Mousavi and Payam Toni Background vocals: Sahra Birang and Sharareh Farnejad
"Halam Khoobe"	Yaha Kashani	Payam Salehi	Hamed Baradaran	Accordion: Firouz Veysanlou Bouzouki: Behnam Hakim Classical guitar: Hamed Baradaran, Kian Darat, Payam Salehi, Firouz Veysanlou Electric guitar: Masoud Homayouni Percussion: Mehran Farshbaf Saxophone: Hooman Namdari Violone: Ashkan Mousavi and Payam Toni Background vocals: Sahra Birang and Sharareh Farnejad
"Cheshmamo Mibandam"	Yaha Kashani	Mazyar Fallahi	Shahab Akbari	Accordion: Firouz Veysanlou Bouzouki: Behnam Hakim Classical guitar: Hamed Baradaran, Kian Darat, Payam Salehi, Firouz Veysanlou Electric guitar: Masoud Homayouni Percussion: Mehran Farshbaf Saxophone: Hooman Namdari Violone: Ashkan Mousavi and Payam Toni Background vocals: Sahra Birang and Sharareh Farnejad
"Mage Mishe"	Sharareh Farnejad	Sharareh Farnejad	Hamed Baradaran	Accordion: Firouz Veysanlou Bouzouki: Behnam Hakim Classical guitar: Hamed Baradaran, Kian Darat, Payam Salehi, Firouz Veysanlou Electric guitar: Masoud Homayouni Percussion: Mehran Farshbaf Saxophone: Hooman Namdari Violone: Ashkan Mousavi and Payam Toni Background vocals: Sahra Birang and Sharareh Farnejad
"To Khoobi"	Yaha Kashani	Babak Jahanbakhsh	Shahab Akbari	Accordion: Firouz Veysanlou Bouzouki: Behnam Hakim Classical guitar: Hamed Baradaran, Kian Darat, Payam Salehi, Firouz Veysanlou Electric guitar: Masoud Homayouni Percussion: Mehran Farshbaf Saxophone: Hooman Namdari Violone: Ashkan Mousavi and Payam Toni Background vocals: Sahra Birang and Sharareh Farnejad
"Hanooz Yeki Hast 2"	Yaha Kashani	Yaha Kashani	Anooshirvan Taghavi	Accordion: Firouz Veysanlou Bouzouki: Behnam Hakim Classical guitar: Hamed Baradaran, Kian Darat, Payam Salehi, Firouz Veysanlou Electric guitar: Masoud Homayouni Percussion: Mehran Farshbaf Saxophone: Hooman Namdari Violone: Ashkan Mousavi and Payam Toni Background vocals: Sahra Birang and Sharareh Farnejad
"Aramesh"	Yaha Kashani	Anooshirvan Taghavi	Anooshirvan Taghavi	Accordion: Firouz Veysanlou Bouzouki: Behnam Hakim Classical guitar: Hamed Baradaran, Kian Darat, Payam Salehi, Firouz Veysanlou Electric guitar: Masoud Homayouni Percussion: Mehran Farshbaf Saxophone: Hooman Namdari Violone: Ashkan Mousavi and Payam Toni Background vocals: Sahra Birang and Sharareh Farnejad

Compilation albums

- Khas ٰproduced by Farzad Farzin (2011)

Singles

- Harchi Khoda Bekhad (2011)
- Asheghete (Ali Hosseinzadeh Remix) (2012)
- Ye Rooze Khoob (2012)
- Bitabi (2012)
- Mohem Nist (2013)
- Hanooz Yeki Hast ft Yaha Kashani (2013)
- To Khoubi (2014)
- Aramesh (2014)
- Cheshmamo Mibandam (2014)
