= Salaam Mumbai =

2016 Iranian-Indian film directed by Ghorban Mohammadpour

- Directed by: Ghorban Mohammadpour
- Written by: Ghorban Mohammadpour
- Produced by: Pahlaj Nihalani; Javad Noroozbeigi
- Starring: Mohammad Reza Golzar; Dia Mirza
- Cinematography: Hassan Pooya
- Edited by: Sohrab Khosravi; Ali Nahavandi
- Music by: Dilshaad Shabbir Shaikh
- Distributed by: Pen N Camera International
- Release dates: 9 August 2016 (Iran); 23 March 2018 (India)
- Running time: 110 minutes (in Iran); 120 minutes (in India)
- Countries: Iran; India
- Languages: Persian; English
- Budget: $2 million
- Box office: $3.9 million (Iran)

Salaam Mumbai (known as Hello Mumbai; Persian: سلام بمبئی) is a 2016 Iranian-Indian drama film directed by Ghorban Mohammadpour. The film stars Iranian actor Mohammad Reza Golzar and Indian actress Dia Mirza in the leading roles. The film features dialogues predominately in Persian and English with Hindi songs. The film was also dubbed in Hindi with the same name.

== Cast ==
- Mohammad Reza Golzar as Ali Mohammadi
- Dia Mirza as Karishma
- Gulshan Grover as Suraj
- Dalip Tahil as Mr. Komar
- Poonam Dhillon as Karishma's mother
- Benyamin Bahadori as Ahmad
- Behrooz Chaihel as Rja
- Shayli Mahmoudi
- Dr Ali Irani
- Nasrullah Quraishi
- Isha Tiwari
- Simran Mishrikoti as Tanjena

== Reception ==
Frahnaz Yousefi from the Islamic Azad University Zahedan, wrote, "it should be mentioned that in spite of having many defects three reasonsfor the movie's success are: the combination of famous actors and actress both from Iran and India, the dance and singing scenes and the third one is being the first conjoint movie after the Islamic Republic of Iran".

== Box office ==
In Iran, the film surpassed the opening record of Asghar Farhadi's Academy Award winning film, The Salesman (2016). Salaam Mumbai grossed 10 billion rials ($260,000) in two days, surpassing the previous record of The Salesman, which grossed the same amount in three days. Salaam Mumbai's final gross in Iran was 146 billion rials ($3.9 million).
