= Naa Manasistha Raa =

2001 Telugu film

- Promotional poster
- Directed by: R. R. Shinde
- Written by: Jandhyala (dialogues)
- Based on: Parthen Rasithen (2000) by Saran
- Produced by: M. Sudhakar
- Starring: Srikanth; Soundarya; Richa
- Cinematography: C. Ramprasad
- Edited by: Marthand K. Venkatesh
- Music by: S. A. Rajkumar
- Production company: Sri Mahaganapathi Films
- Release date: 18 July 2001
- Country: India
- Language: Telugu

Naa Manasistha Raa (transl. Come, I will give you my heart) is a 2001 Indian Telugu-language romantic thriller film directed by R. R. Shinde. It stars Srikanth, Soundarya, and Richa. The film is a remake of the Tamil film Parthen Rasithen (2000).

The film released on 18 July 2001 and was a semi-hit at the box office.

== Plot ==
Shankar, an aeronautical engineer, is a soft spoken man. He befriends Nandini, a student of medicine and the both share a platonic relationship. Despite this, Shankar spends a lot of time as a loner blowing his mouth organ. Seershika, who works as an employee at a private firm, meets Shankar and starts liking him as a person as well as his taste in music.

Shankar reciprocates her feelings, and they both fall in love with each other. As they decide to get marry, Shankar's parents who live in Dubai come to India as start the wedding arrangements. Meanwhile, Nandini takes an opportunity and confesses her love to Shankar. Shankar however never had any romantic feelings towards Nandini. Seershika poisons herself and gets hospitalised, and survives. However both Shankar and Seershika get reunited in the end.

== Cast ==
- Srikanth as Shankar
- Soundarya as Nandini
- Richa as Seershika
- Kota Srinivasa Rao as Shankar's father
- Sangeeta as Shankar's mother
- Prithivi
- Brahmanandam
- Sivaji Raja
- Sudhakar as Parasuram
- Tanikella Bharani
- Sunil as Cab driver
- Hema
- Telangana Shakuntala
- Sudha
- Kallu Chidambaram

== Production ==
After the success of films ending with Raa, Ninne Premistha (2000) director R. R. Shinde titled this film Manasistha Raa before Naa was appended to the beginning. The film is produced by Sudhakar, who produced Taraka Ramudu (1997). Shooting was scheduled to start on 18 January 2001 but was postponed to the second week of February of the same year. Srikanth and Soundarya shot for this film and Kalisi Naduddam (2001) at the same time.

== Soundtrack ==
Songs are composed by S. A. Rajkumar, who reused all tunes from the original Tamil film originally composed by Bharadwaj. Kiran of Telugu cinema called it a good album and a definite plus to the film.

- "Twinkle Twinkle" – Rajesh, Sunitha
- "Punnami Jabili" – S. P. Balasubrahmanyam, Sunitha
- "Kadantava" – Rajesh, Sunitha
- "Sakkubai" – Udit Narayan
- "Champodhe" – Shankar Mahadevan, Anuradha Sriram
- "Ooh Prema" – Devan

== Reception ==
Griddaluru Gopalrao of Zamin Ryot gave a positive review for the film. He appreciated the storyline, performances of the leads and camerawork of the film. Ajay Bashyam of Full Hyderabad wrote, "Right from the name (ouch!), everything about Naa Manasista... Raa! is filmy. It's an old problem – the story starts off pretty okay and has enough steam to carry it till the interval, then there is the twist [...] and then the writer keeps coming up with new problems just to pull along the film for the second half". CV of Telugu Cinema found Srikanth and Soundarya to be miscast but praised Richa's underplayed acting and concluded Shinde joining the list of directors whose creativity dried up with their second films.

== Box office ==
A writer from News18 attributed the film's failure with the audience's rejection of Soundarya in a negative role.
