= Benyamin Bahadori =

Iranian pop singer (born 1982)

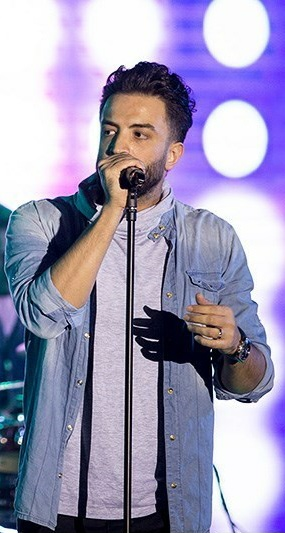
- Bahadori in the concert
- Born: Vahid Bahadori; 9 September 1982 (age 43); Tehran, Iran
- Occupations: Singer; Songwriter; Composer; Actor
- Height: 1.87 m (6 ft 2 in)
- Musical career
- Genres: Pop
- Instruments: Vocals; Guitar
- Years active: 2005–present
- Labels: Salim Ahmadi Avaye Nekisa, Taraneye Sharghi

Benyamin Bahadori (Persian: بنیامین بهادری) is an Iranian pop singer, composer, songwriter and actor. from Tehran, Iran. His first album,"85" released in 2006, was a massive commercial success within Iran and with the Iranian diaspora abroad. Also known as his stage name Benyamin, he is one of the most popular pop singers in Iran. Benyamin has released four studio albums and numerous singles so far. He also sang soundtracks for the Movies "Gorgo Mish" and "A Few Cubic Meters of Love" ("Chand Metr Moka'ab Eshgh"). In 2007, a BBC documentary called "Rageh Inside Iran" described him as a "Big Star of Iran" who had sold twenty million copies of his album at the beginning of his career. Although a pop singer, Benyamin often includes elements of hip hop (Biya Ashegham kon) and rap (Kojaye Donyai) into his music and some of the songs in his latest album "94" have English lyrics. Benyamin is also known as "Aghae Eshgh" or "Mr. Love" among his fans because his songs mostly center on romantic themes.

== Early life ==
Benyamin (born as Vahid Bahadori) was born into a traditional Muslim family of Jewish descent and grew up in a small neighborhood in the south of Tehran. He became interested in music ever since he was a child. To honor his Jewish lineage, he chose the stage name Benyamin, derived from Hebrew, referring to the Biblical figure of the same name.

== Albums ==
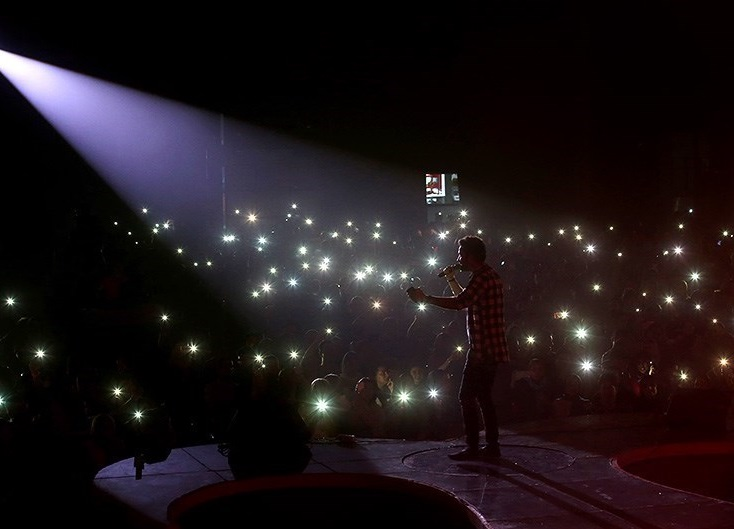
Benyamin's concert in Kish Island, 25 March 2016

Benyamin's first album was an instant hit; It turned him into a star in a short time. Songs from the first album,"85" include "Khatereha" (Memories), also known as "Donya Dige Mesle To Nadare", "Loknat" (Stutter), "Adam Ahani" (Robot) also known as "Halam Badeh" and "Man Emshab Mimiram" (I Will Die Tonight). In September 2006, Benyamin Bahadori traveled to Sweden to have concerts in Stockholm, which marked the start of his international concerts. Still, he did not perform concerts in Iran until four years later. His second album,"88" was released in April 2009 and sold 500,000 units within a week of its release. It contains a total of 17 songs (most in any of his four albums) and includes popular songs like "Shenasnameh", " Kojaye Donyai" (Where in the world), " Ahay to"(Hey you), "Sedaye Ghalbe to"(Sound of your heart) and "Leili dar Paeiz"(Layla in the Autumn). The third and most anticipated album "93" was released in March 2014 after a long gap of five years with songs like "Ghahve"(Coffee), "Madar"(Orbit), "Hafte Eshgh"(Week of Love) and "Faghat sabine khodeti" (You're just like yourself). His last album,"94" was released in July 2015, just over a year after the release of his third album. This is the shortest period between two albums and it was a pleasant surprise for his fans because the last album took too long to come out. This album has songs like "Eshkal", "Havasam Be Toe", "Track 4" and " Barana" which he sang for his daughter Barana Bahadori. Benyamin has experimented with the addition of English lyrics in his latest album and has received mixed reviews from fans.

His albums are named after the year in which they were released according to the Persian calendar.

Benyamin Bahadori is also noted for his religious-themed compositions like "Agham Agham", "Karbala", "Ye Pahlevon", "Lalaii".

== Concerts ==
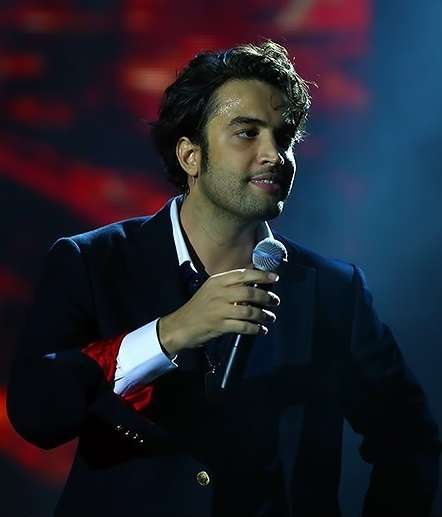
Benyamin during a concert in Milad Tower in 2014

He made his official concert debut in Iran in March 2010 during the "Fajr International Music Festival" held at Milad Tower in Tehran and has been performing there every year since. He has also performed in many cities across Iran and many countries worldwide, like England, Germany, Austria, Norway, Australia, Malaysia, Tajikistan, America, Canada, U.A.E.

== Benyamin Music Group ==
Benyamin has this particular group of musicians who travel with him in and outside the country to perform in concerts. These are Ali Mansouri (The leader of the Orchestra, keyboard and occasional background vocals) Alireza Miragha (Trumpet and Percussion) Arash Saeedi (Bass) Allen Barsekhian (Electric Guitar), Steve Avanessian (Drums, English vocals in "94") Mohammad Mojerloo (Background vocals, Music arrangements for "94") and the late Nima Varasteh (Violinist) who made music arrangements for the first three albums of Benyamin.

== Personal life ==
Benyamin Bahadori married Nasim Heshmati in 2010; they have one daughter named Barana Bahadori. Benyamin did not announce the news of his marriage, and most people were unaware of his wife and kid until the death of his wife in an accident in Tehran on 20 December 2013. Benyamin was driving home, along with Nasim and (at the time) their two-year-old Barana, when the car ran off the road; Benyamin and Barana did not get hurt, but Nasim died hours later in the hospital due to severe injuries. Benyamin released a song called "Ye khoone" (A house), which he sang in memory of his late wife and, according to a post he made on Facebook, took eleven years to complete. The song was released on her birthday, a month after she died. In 2015, Benyamin Bahadori married Shaily Mahmoudi, an Indian-Pathan resident of America. Together, they acted in an Iranian-Indian drama film where Benyamin falls in love with an Indian girl, played by Shaily. Together they have two boys, Benson Bahadori and Shaimin Bahadori.

== Discography ==
=== Songs for Movies ===
- Hamsafar (Gorgo Mish)
- Fereshteh (Gorgo Mish)
- Tanhayi (Gorgo Mish)
- Chand Metr Moka'ab Eshgh (A Few Cubic Meters of Love )
- Parizad (Salam Bombay)
- Doori (Salam Bombay)
- Ye Bar Dige Eshtebah Kon (Salam Bombay)

=== Single Tracks ===
- Mano Bebakhsh (2007 Cover of Naser Abdolahi song)
- Booye Eydi (19 March 2010 Cover of Farhad Mehrad song with altered lyrics)
- Khate Sevom (18 March 2011)
- Ta Hala Ashegh Shodi (July 2012)
- Ashoob (10 July 2012)
- Gerye Dar Mah (21 July 2012)
- Moje Moharam feat. Sohrab Pakzad (18 November 2012)
- Ghalbe Moharam (21 November 2012)
- Hafteh Eshgh (11 February 2013)
- Ye Khoone (26 January 2014)
- Eshgh Ehsaseh (22 April 2013)
- Aslan Sedash Kardi (23 July 2014)
- Mahdoodiat (9 September 2014)
- Eshgh feat. Arvin Saheb (6 October 2014)
- parizad (2 January 2017)
- Kabir (8 June 2017)
- Rahat (7 November 2019)
- To khoshgeli ( 18 December 2019)
- Lalaeihamoon ( 6 March 2020 )
- Rafigh ( 6 may 2020)

=== Albums ===
==== Released 5 March 2006 ====
85
No.	Title	Year	Length
1.	"Loknat"	2006	03:12
2.	"Ashegh Shodam"	2006	03:13
3.	"Khatereha"	2006	02:48
4.	"Inam Bemoone"	2006	03:44
5.	"Yadam Miad"	2006	03:45
6.	"Bi Etena"	2006	03:48
7.	"Man Emshab Mimiram"	2006	04:31
8.	"Taraneh Vajeh"	2006	03:34
9.	"Adam Ahani"	2006	04:39
Total length:			33:18

==== Released 28 April 2009 ====
88
No.	Title	Year	Length
1.	"Shenasnameh (Intro)"	2009	01:17
2.	"Kojaye Donya"	2009	03:12
3.	"Mano Tanha"	2009	02:59
4.	"Asheghi Ba To"	2009	03:11
5.	"Ahay To"	2009	03:10
6.	"Eshghe Adam Kosh"	2009	03:12
7.	"Bia Ashegham Kon"	2009	02:41
8.	"Ey Vay Delam"	2009	02:50
9.	"Sedaye Ghalbeh To"	2009	02:57
10.	"Khab"	2009	03:52
11.	"Man-e Lanati (Ft Payam Shams)"	2009	00:53
12.	"Reifigha Migan"	2009	02:59
13.	"Parseh"	2009	00:49
14.	"Leili Dar Paieez"	2009	02:46
15.	"Hafteh Be Hafteh"	2009	00:24
16.	"Shomineh"	2009	03:06
17.	"Tamoom Shod (Payan)"	2009	01:09
Total length:			41:33

==== Released 5 March 2014 ====
93
No.	Title	Year	Length
1.	"Ghahve"	2014	04:21
2.	"Jadogare Gisoo"	2014	02:30
3.	"Madaar"	2014	03:32
4.	"Dobareh Cheshmat"	2014	03:00
5.	"Hafteh Eshgh"	2013	04:05
6.	"Dast Negah Dar"	2014	05:06
7.	"Eshghe Daaghe Man"	2014	03:57
8.	"Ye Khoone"	2014	03:49
9.	"Faghat Shabihe Khodeti"	2014	03:13
10.	"Gole Yas 2"	2014	04:30
11.	"Ashoob"	2012	03:31
12.	"Eshgh Dar Roze Ghiyamat"	2014	04:02
Total length:			45:40

Released 14 July 2015

94
No.	Title	Year	Length
1.	"Eshkal"	2015	03:39
2.	"Tazahor"	2015	02:50
3.	"Havasam Be Toe"	2015	03:46
4.	"Dorehaye Asheghi"	2015	04:05
5.	"Barana"	2015	03:55
6.	"Meh Alood"	2015	04:49
7.	"Track 4"	2015	03:40
8.	"Ashegh Mesle Mah"	2015	03:35
9.	"Be Man Etemad Kon"	2015	04:21
Total length:			34:34

== Filmography ==
- 2016 Salaam Mumbai
