= Nima Varasteh =

Iranian musician (1979–2014)

Background information
- Born: Nima Varasteh; February 5, 1979
- Origin: Tehran, Iran
- Died: May 19, 2014 (aged 35)
- Genre: Pop music
- Occupations: Musician, record producer
- Instruments: Violin, piano, organ, synthesizer
- Years active: 2000–2014

Nima Varasteh Persian: نیما وارسته (5 February 1979 – 19 May 2014) was an Iranian composer, arranger, and musician. Varasteh was one of the first individuals to set up a digital studio in Iran.

== Life and education ==
Nima Varasteh was born on 5 February 1979 in Tehran. He held a master's degree in mechanical engineering. At the insistence of his grandmother, he started learning the violin at the age of eight. He later learned to play instruments such as the piano, organ, and synthesizer.

== Career ==
Varasteh established Avalin Khaneye Honar Studio, which, at the time, was considered one of the best studios in the country for quality and sound output. He was among the first to open a digital studio in Iran. He was a close friend of Benyamin Bahadri, Farid Ahmadi and Hamid Askari. He arranged Benyamin's 85 album in his own studio. Following his death, a video of him playing in a Benyamin Bahadri's concert achieved a record of one million downloads on the "musicema" website.

== Years of activity and works ==
His notable works include the recording of the album "until infinity..." by the Aryan group, the recording mixing, and mastering of Benyamin's 85 album, and serving as the violinist and synthesizer player on several albums.

His first recorded activity was arranging a single from the album "Hamshahri Khobam" in 2000, which featured the voice of Samin Vatandoust. In 2002, he participated in a concert of Saat group as a violinist.

== Collaborations ==
Throughout his artistic career, Nima Varasteh collaborated with a large number of pop music artists. His work included playing the violin with the Aryan Group, arranging albums for singers such as Hamid Askari, Khashayar E'temadi, Payam Salehi, Vahid Hamed, Mohsen Hemmati, Sohrab Pakzad, Amir Tabari, Ali Hosseinzadeh, Farhad Javaher Kalam, and Sami Yusuf. Additionally, he conducted the concert orchestras for Hamid Askari and Benyamin Bahadori, among others.

His last activity was attending Benyamin Bahadri's concert, held at Milad International Exhibition Hall.

== Death and legacy ==
According to Dariush Salehpour, one of Varasteh's neighbors contacted him late one night to inform him that Varastehhad an accident in the swimming pool due to a lack of air, which apparently resulted in heart failure.

Arjamand, the director general of the music office, was the first speaker at the funeral ceremony. The memorial ceremony on the third day of his death was held in Noor Mosque in Fatemi Square, attended by figures such as Benyamin Bahadori and Hamid Askari.

== Dedicated to the memory ==
- Hamid Askari held a concert in Rasht in memory of Nima Varasteh.
- Musicema dedicated a statue in Varasteh's name during the second annual celebration.
- Benyamin Bahadori held a concert in memory of Nima Varasteh.
- The album "Galaxies" was unveiled at Varasteh's gravesite (he was in charge of arranging two tracks on the album).
