= Arian (band) =

Iranian music band

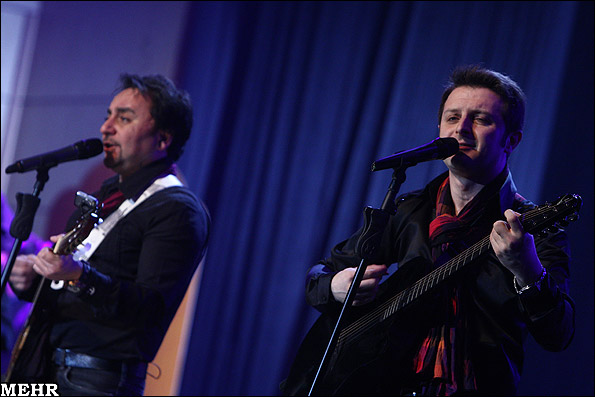

Background information
- Origin: Tehran, Iran
- Genres: Pop; Alternative Music
- Years active: 1998–2015
- Label: Helianth Productions
- Members: Ali Pahlavan; Payam Salehi; Ninef Amirkhas; Siamak Khahani; Alireza Tabatabaee; Sharareh Farnejad; Sahar Kashmari; Sanaz Kashmari
- Past members: Mohammad Reza Golzar; Amir Hossein Mostaed; Borzou Badihi

Aryan or Arian (Persian: آریان) is the first Persian pop band consisting of both male and female singers and players in Iran after the 1979 Islamic Revolution. Pahlavan and Salehi are the band's lead vocalists, and the songwriters are Pahlavan, Salehi, Amirkhas, Khahani and Farnejad. Their second, third and fourth albums were the bestselling albums of their release years. They are the first Iranian band to feature in the "International Who's Who in Music". They have released four albums, and played concerts around the globe. They donate part of their profits to the "United Nations World Food Programme".

The reason the band stopped making music was mentioned in an interview with one of the lead vocalists, Ali Pahlavan. First, Ninef Amirkhas, the arranger of all songs and an important member directing the band, left the country. With Ninef Amirkhas leaving, all of the responsibilities were now left on Pahlavan's shoulder. "But then came the disputes with our producer and problems with the officials. As the problems grew larger, members gradually lost their enthusiasm due to the lack of suitable conditions to work, and finally called it a day”, Pahlavan said in an interview back in 2015.

== Albums ==
Their debut album, Gole Aftabgardoon (The Sunflower) was released in 2000.

Their second album, however, had more complex lyrics. It was named Va Amma, Eshgh (And Now, Love) and released in 2001. It took three years to release the third album, Till Eternity..., released in 2004.

In a recent interview with BBC they said, "Now we have a responsibility, we should be better and introduce ourselves all over the world. "If you go to Iranian movies all you see is misery - nothing else. People think Iran is like this - everything is a desert, all the people are crying.... We wanted to show the real Iran".

In 2008, they released their fourth album, Bi to Ba to, and they worked together with Chris de Burgh and produced an English-Persian version of de Burgh's song "The Words I Love You" (A light for eternity). In 2009, Arian released a single called "Here Comes Nowruz, Here Comes Spring" for the Iranian new year.

== Current members ==
- Ali Pahlavan (Vocals & Guitar)
- Payam Salehi (Vocals & Guitar)
- Ninef Amirkhas (Keyboard) (studying in the United States)

== Guest players ==
- Farzad Fakhreddini (Electric Guitar)
- Dara Daraei (Bass Guitar)
- Shahab Hosseini (Keyboard)
- Alireza Miraqa (Percussion)
- Amid Bonakdar (Bass Guitar)

Former guest players

- Tirdad Keshavarzi (Electric Guitar) - Tehran Milad Hall (Tehran International Fair)
- Saman Emami (Electric Guitar)- Tehran S'ad Abad Palace.
- Milad Zendeh Naam (Electric Guitar) - Dubai
- Babak Akhoundi (Electric Guitar)- Uk, Germany Tour

Guest players in albums

- Abbas Sadeqi (Electric Guitar)
- Babak Akhoundi (Electric Guitar)
- Fleming Khoshqadami (Harmonica)
- Farzad Fakhreddini (Electric Guitar)
- Jaber Eta'ati (Accordion)

== Discography ==
=== Albums ===
- Gole Aftabgardoon (گل آفتابگردون) (2000)
- Va Amma Eshgh (2001) (و اما عشق)
- Ta Binahayat (2004) (تا بی نهایت)
- Bi To Ba To (2008) (بی تو با تو)
- Khoda Hafez (2015) (خداحافظ)

Gole Aftabgardoon, Taraneh Sharghi Records				Notes
Ali Pahlavan / Payam Salehi				Notes
Name	Songwriter	Composer	Arrangement	Notes
"Setareh"	Ali Pahlavan	Ninef Amirkhas	Ninef Amirkhas	
"Gole Aftabgardoon"	Ali Pahlavan	Ali Pahlavan	Ninef Amirkhas	
"Age Dastamo Begiri"	Ali Pahlavan	Ali Pahlavan	Ninef Amirkhas	
"Gharibeh"	Payam Salehi	Payam Salehi	Ninef Amirkhas	
"Madar"	Payam Salehi	Payam Salehi	Ninef Amirkhas	
"Mola Ali Jan"	Darab Pahlavan	Ali Pahlavan & Payam Salehi	Ninef Amirkhas	
"Yase Kabood"	Ali Pahlavan	Ali Pahlavan	Ninef Amirkhas	
"Mosafer"	Ali Pahlavan	Ali Pahlavan	Ninef Amirkhas	
"Baroon"	Ali Pahlavan	Ali Pahlavan	Ninef Amirkhas	
"Farda Male Mast"	Ali Pahlavan	Ali Pahlavan	Ninef Amirkhas	

Va Amma Eshgh, Taraneh Sharghi Records				Notes
Ali Pahlavan / Payam Salehi				Notes
Name	Songwriter	Composer	Arrangement	Notes
"Parvaz"	Ali Pahlavan & Ninef Amirkhas	Siamak Khahani	Ninef Amirkhas	
"Panjereh"	Ali Pahlavan	Ali Pahlavan	Ninef Amirkhas	
"Gol e Man"	Ali Pahlavan	Ali Pahlavan	Ninef Amirkhas	
"Na Mehraboon"	Sharareh Farnejad	Sharareh Farnejad	Ninef Amirkhas	
"Gol e Hamisheh Bahar"	Ninef Amirkhas	Ninef Amirkhas	Ninef Amirkhas	
"Bahooneh"	Sharareh Farnejad, Ali Pahlavan, Ninef Amirkhas	Payam Salehi	Ninef Amirkhas	
"Iran"	Fahimeh Radmand	Payam Salehi, Ali Pahlavan, Ninef Amirkhas	Ninef Amirkhas	
"Taraneye Eshgh"	Ninef Amirkhas	Siamak Khahani	Ninef Amirkhas	
"Hamdame Ghoroob"	Ninef Amirkhas	Ninef Amirkhas	Ninef Amirkhas	
"Roya Ye Sepid"	Sharareh Farnejad	Sharareh Farnejad	Ninef Amirkhas	
"Hamraz"	Ninef Amirkhas	Ninef Amirkhas	Ninef Amirkhas	
"Bemmon Ta Bemoonam"	Ali Pahlavan	Ali Pahlavan	Ninef Amirkhas	

Ta Binahayat, Taraneh Sharghi Records
Ali Pahlavan / Payam Salehi
Name	Songwriter	Composer	Arrangement	Notes
"Afsoongar"	Ninef Amirkhas, Ali Pahlavan	Ali Pahlavan, Ninef Amirkhas, Siamak Khahani	Ninef Amirkhas	Electric guitar : Babak Akhoundi Harmonica : Feleming Khoshghadami Music engineer : Nima Varasteh & Mohamad Nosrati
"Bezar Beram"	Sharareh Farnejad	Sharareh Farnejad	Ninef Amirkhas	Electric guitar : Babak Akhoundi Harmonica : Feleming Khoshghadami Music engineer : Nima Varasteh & Mohamad Nosrati
"Kaashki"	Sharareh Farnejad	Sharareh Farnejad	Ninef Amirkhas	Electric guitar : Babak Akhoundi Harmonica : Feleming Khoshghadami Music engineer : Nima Varasteh & Mohamad Nosrati
"Sokoot"	Ninef Amirkhas	Ninef Amirkhas	Ninef Amirkhas	Electric guitar : Babak Akhoundi Harmonica : Feleming Khoshghadami Music engineer : Nima Varasteh & Mohamad Nosrati
"Telesm"	Ali Pahlavan	Ali Pahlavan	Ninef Amirkhas	Electric guitar : Babak Akhoundi Harmonica : Feleming Khoshghadami Music engineer : Nima Varasteh & Mohamad Nosrati
"Qasr-E-Sheni"	Payam Salehi	Payam Salehi	Ninef Amirkhas	Electric guitar : Babak Akhoundi Harmonica : Feleming Khoshghadami Music engineer : Nima Varasteh & Mohamad Nosrati
"Shaparak"	Ninef Amirkhas, Ali Pahlavan	Ali Pahlavan	Ninef Amirkhas	Electric guitar : Babak Akhoundi Harmonica : Feleming Khoshghadami Music engineer : Nima Varasteh & Mohamad Nosrati
"Gomshodeye Man"	Mahsan Abedi	Ali Pahlavan	Ninef Amirkhas	Electric guitar : Babak Akhoundi Harmonica : Feleming Khoshghadami Music engineer : Nima Varasteh & Mohamad Nosrati
"Kabootarhaye Sepid"	Simón Amirkhas, Ninef Amirkhas, Ali Pahlavan	Ali Pahlavan, Ninef Amirkhas	Ninef Amirkhas	Electric guitar : Babak Akhoundi Harmonica : Feleming Khoshghadami Music engineer : Nima Varasteh & Mohamad Nosrati
"Khorshid E Eshgh"	Ninef Amirkhas, Ali Pahlavan, Sharareh Farnejad	Ali Pahlavan	Ninef Amirkhas	Electric guitar : Babak Akhoundi Harmonica : Feleming Khoshghadami Music engineer : Nima Varasteh & Mohamad Nosrati
"Mageh Misheh"	Ninef Amirkhas	Ninef Amirkhas	Ninef Amirkhas	Electric guitar : Babak Akhoundi Harmonica : Feleming Khoshghadami Music engineer : Nima Varasteh & Mohamad Nosrati
"Aroom Arooom"	Ninef Amirkhas, Ali Pahlavan	Siamak Khahani	Ninef Amirkhas	Electric guitar : Babak Akhoundi Harmonica : Feleming Khoshghadami Music engineer : Nima Varasteh & Mohamad Nosrati

Bi To Ba To, Taraneh Sharghi Records
Ali Pahlavan / Payam Salehi
Name	Songwriter	Composer	Arrangement	Notes
"Qasedak"	Ali Pahlavan	Ali Pahlavan	Ninef Amirkhas	Music engineer : Ninef Amirkhas Mix & Mastring : Sirvan Khosravi
"Tab"	Ninef Amirkhas	Siamak Khahani	Ninef Amirkhas	Music engineer : Ninef Amirkhas Mix & Mastring : Sirvan Khosravi
"The Words I Love You" feat. Chris de Burgh	Chris de Burgh & Ninef Amirkhas	Chris de Burgh	Ninef Amirkhas	Music engineer : Ninef Amirkhas Mix & Mastring : Sirvan Khosravi
"Lahzeh Ha"	Ali Pahlavan	Ali Pahlavan	Ninef Amirkhas	Music engineer : Ninef Amirkhas Mix & Mastring : Sirvan Khosravi
"Ki Bejoz Man"	Ninef Amirkhas	Ninef Amirkhas	Ninef Amirkhas	Music engineer : Ninef Amirkhas Mix & Mastring : Sirvan Khosravi
"Hanooz Baram Hamooni"	Sharareh Farnejad	Sharareh Farnejad	Ninef Amirkhas	Music engineer : Ninef Amirkhas Mix & Mastring : Sirvan Khosravi
"Bi To Ba To"	Ali Pahlavan	Ali Pahlavan	Ninef Amirkhas	Music engineer : Ninef Amirkhas Mix & Mastring : Sirvan Khosravi
"Man Age Jaye To Boodam"	Ninef Amirkhas, Sharareh Farnejad	Ninef Amirkhas, Sharareh Farnejad	Ninef Amirkhas	Music engineer : Ninef Amirkhas Mix & Mastring : Sirvan Khosravi
"Nagoo"	Payam Salehi	Payam Salehi	Ninef Amirkhas	Music engineer : Ninef Amirkhas Mix & Mastring : Sirvan Khosravi
"Sahel"	Ali Pahlavan	Ali Pahlavan	Ninef Amirkhas	Music engineer : Ninef Amirkhas Mix & Mastring : Sirvan Khosravi
"Khabeh Naz"	Ninef Amirkhas	Ninef Amirkhas	Ninef Amirkhas	Music engineer : Ninef Amirkhas Mix & Mastring : Sirvan Khosravi
"Ey Javidan Iran"	Ninef Amirkhas	Ali Pahlavan	Ninef Amirkhas	Music engineer : Ninef Amirkhas Mix & Mastring : Sirvan Khosravi
"Oon Rooza"	Ninef Amirkhas	Ali Pahlavan, Ninef Amirkhas	Ninef Amirkhas	Music engineer : Ninef Amirkhas Mix & Mastring : Sirvan Khosravi
"Nagoo (Remix)"	Payam Salehi	Payam Salehi	Ninef Amirkhas	Music engineer : Ninef Amirkhas Mix & Mastring : Sirvan Khosravi

Goodbye, Taraneh Sharghi Records, Honar Aval
Ali Pahlavan / Payam Salehi
Name	Songwriter	Composer	Arrangement	Notes
"Bargard"	Ali Pahlavan	Ali Pahlavan	Farshad Farsian	Electric guitar : Farzad Fakhreddini Harmonica : Babak Safarnejad Mix and Mastring : Amir Tafreshi
"Bishtar"	Ali Pahlavan	Ali Pahlavan	Shahab Hosseini	Electric guitar : Farzad Fakhreddini Harmonica : Babak Safarnejad Mix and Mastring : Amir Tafreshi
"Deltangi-Haa"	Ali Pahlavan	Ali Pahlavan	Saeed Modarres	Electric guitar : Farzad Fakhreddini Harmonica : Babak Safarnejad Mix and Mastring : Amir Tafreshi
"Faseleh"	Ali Pahlavan	Ali Pahlavan	Shahab Hosseini	Electric guitar : Farzad Fakhreddini Harmonica : Babak Safarnejad Mix and Mastring : Amir Tafreshi
"Delam Barat Tang Shodeh"	Sharareh Farnejad	Sharareh Farnejad	Saeed Modarres	Electric guitar : Farzad Fakhreddini Harmonica : Babak Safarnejad Mix and Mastring : Amir Tafreshi
"To Moondi o Man"	Ali Pahlavan	Ali Pahlavan	Shahab Hosseini	Electric guitar : Farzad Fakhreddini Harmonica : Babak Safarnejad Mix and Mastring : Amir Tafreshi
"Nemidoonam"	Ali Pahlavan	Ali Pahlavan	Farshad Farsian	Electric guitar : Farzad Fakhreddini Harmonica : Babak Safarnejad Mix and Mastring : Amir Tafreshi
"To Ke Ba Man Bashi"	Ali Pahlavan	Siamak Khahani	Saeed Modarres	Electric guitar : Farzad Fakhreddini Harmonica : Babak Safarnejad Mix and Mastring : Amir Tafreshi
"Ba'de To"	Sharareh Farnejad	Sharareh Farnejad	Shahab Hosseini	Electric guitar : Farzad Fakhreddini Harmonica : Babak Safarnejad Mix and Mastring : Amir Tafreshi
"Too Cheshaye Man Negah Kon"	Ali Pahlavan	Ali Pahlavan	Shahab Hosseini	Electric guitar : Farzad Fakhreddini Harmonica : Babak Safarnejad Mix and Mastring : Amir Tafreshi
"Taa Abad"	Ali Pahlavan	Ali Pahlavan	Farshad Farsian	Electric guitar : Farzad Fakhreddini Harmonica : Babak Safarnejad Mix and Mastring : Amir Tafreshi

=== Singles ===
- "Here Comes Nowruz, Here Comes Spring" (2009) (عيد اومد بهار اومد)
- "The Footsteps of Hope" (2010) (صدای پای اميد)
- "Seven" (2010) (هفت)
- "Since You Have Gone" (2010) (از روزی که رفتی)
- "Miss You Lots" (2010) (تو رو کم دارم)
- "Flight - Club Mix" (2010) (پرواز - کلاب میکس)

== Videography ==
- Arian Band - Parvaz
- The Words I Love You - (HD Quality DVD)
