= Ali Pahlavan =

Iranian musician (born 1975)

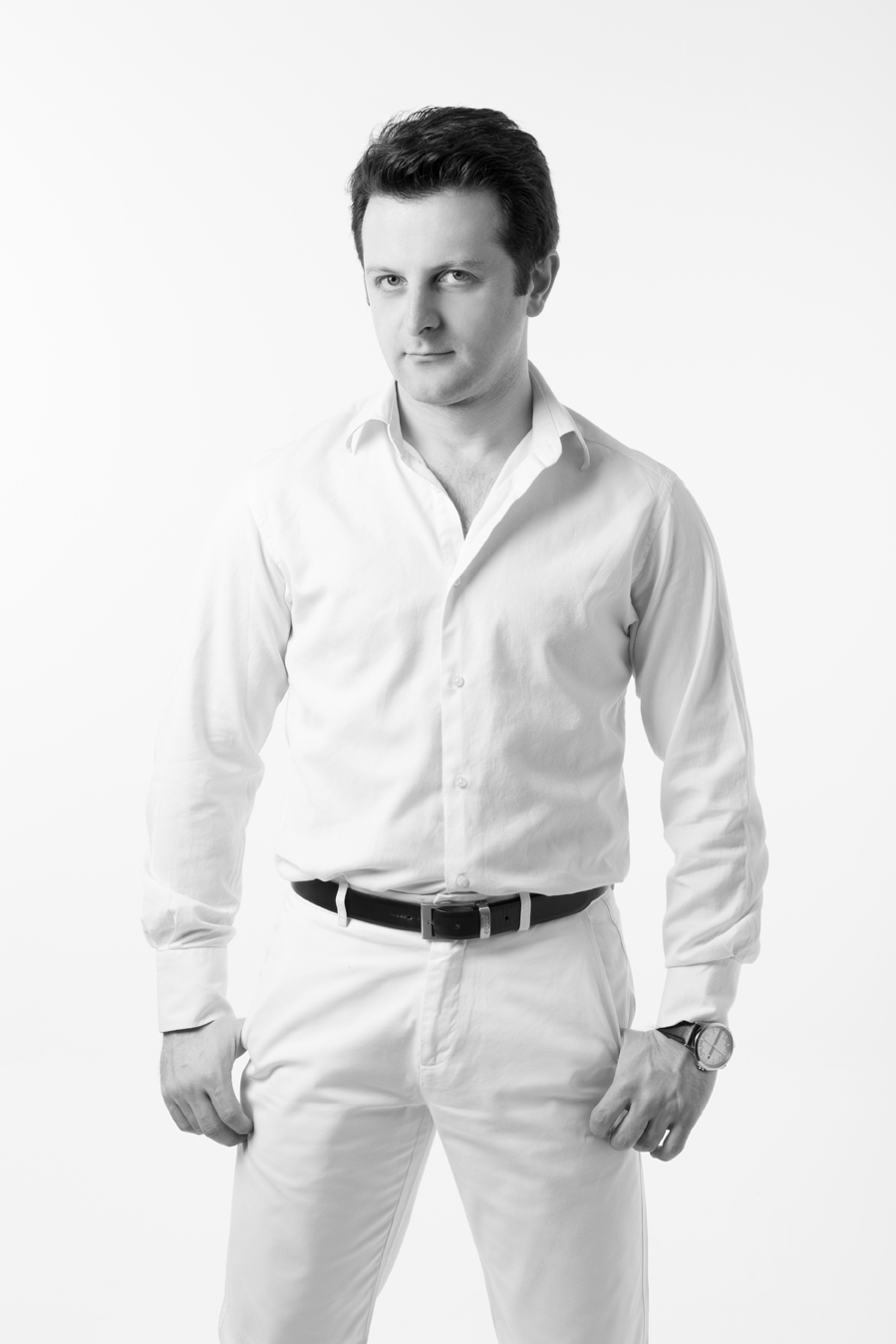

Background information
- Born: 1 May 1975 (age 51); Tehran, Iran
- Genre: Pop
- Occupations: Musician, songwriter, music producer
- Instruments: Guitar, vocals
- Years active: 1999–present
- Formerly of: Arian
- Website: www.alipahlavan.com

Ali Pahlavan (Persian: علی پهلوان) is an Iranian-Australian singer, songwriter, composer and music producer. He co-founded the pop group Arian in 1999 and was one of its lead singers and guitarists. Arian was among the first officially approved Iranian pop groups after the 1979 revolution to feature both male and female members.

After Arian ended its regular activity, Pahlavan continued as a solo musician in Australia. His song “Naab” received the People's Voice prize at the 2018 International Songwriting Competition, while “Rahaa Dar Baad” received an honorable mention in the competition's World Music category in 2023. In 2025, he appeared with Chris de Burgh at the Sydney Opera House, where they performed their earlier collaboration live together for the first time.

== Personal life ==
Ali Pahlavan was born on 1 May 1975, in Tehran, Iran. Although Pahlavan's primary instrument was the Daf (Persian: دف), a traditional musical instrument from Iran, he decided to continue his musical life with the Guitar. He started learning guitar from Vafa Faraji when he was 17. He studied Industrial Engineering at university and in addition to his music career, works as a project management consultant. Ali immigrated to Australia and became an Australian citizen.

== With the Arian band (1998–2015) ==
Ali and Payam Salehi, the other vocalist of Arian decided to create the first Iranian mixed-gender pop band and have a concert together. This decision resulted in a concert in Qeshm island one year later in 1998. This concert was the biggest leap for the group, where they met a producer who asked them to create an album, and things went bigger than they expected. Pahlavan and other members of Arian published 6 albums:

- Gol-e-Aftabgardoon (Sunflower) – 2000 – Sold more than 1.7 million official copies in Iran
- Va Amma Eshgh (And but Love... ) – 2001 – Sold more than 2.5 million official copies in Iran
- Taa Binahayat (Till Eternity) – 2003 – Nominated for BBC3 World Music Award
- Bi To Ba To (Without You With You) – 2008 – Featuring Chris de Burgh
- Tak Ahangha – Single Tracks – 2011
- Khodahafez (Goodbye) – 2015

Being on top of the charts in Iran, Arian decided to go beyond the borders and hold concerts worldwide. They traveled to Canada, Europe, USA and some Asian countries. They performed a lot of successful concerts world wide. At one point, the band sold more than 54,000 tickets for one of their concerts in less than six hours. Touring Europe, they met Chris De Burgh and produced a Persian-English version of his song "The Words I Love You".

Ali also published a book containing the chords and vocal notes of the Arian Band's songs. The book is called: The Arian Band Easy Guitar Songs.

== Solo career ==
Pahlavan moved to Australia in 2012 and continued recording as an independent artist. In September 2014, ISNA reported the release of his first independent single, “Khaterehaye Soot-o-Koor”, while Arian was preparing its farewell album.

Pahlavan's “Naab” received the People's Voice prize in the 2018 International Songwriting Competition. His 2023 song “Rahaa Dar Baad” was named a finalist in the World Music category of the John Lennon Songwriting Contest and received an honorable mention in the same category of the International Songwriting Competition.

In 2025, Pahlavan joined Chris de Burgh during a concert at the Sydney Opera House. They performed “The Words 'I Love You'”, which had previously appeared on Arian's fourth album.

== Songwriting recognition ==
| Year | Work | Recognition |
|---|---|---|
| 2018 | “Naab” | People's Voice prize, International Songwriting Competition |
| 2023 | “Rahaa Dar Baad” | Finalist, John Lennon Songwriting Contest, World Music category |
| 2023 | “Rahaa Dar Baad” | Honorable mention, International Songwriting Competition, World Music category |

== Achievements ==
- Winner – People's Voice Prize – International Songwriting Competition 2018 – Ali Pahlavan – Song: Naab
- Honorable Mention – World Music Category – International Songwriting Competition 2018 – Ali Pahlavan – Song: Naab
- Semi-finalist -Music City SongStar Songwriting competition Fall 2018 – Ali Pahlavan – Song: Naab
- Semi-finalist -Unsigned Only Songwriting competition 2019 – Ali Pahlavan – Song: Naab
- Semi-finalist -BBC3 Audience Awards – The Arian Band – Album: Till Eternity
- Certificate of Appreciation – World Food Programme – Ali Pahlavan and the Arian Band – Song: Footsteps of Hope.
