= Kaun Hai Jo Sapno Mein Aaya =

- Directed by: Rajesh Bhatt
- Screenplay by: Mehmood Ali
- Story by: Mehmood Ali
- Produced by: Vibha Ragani
- Starring: Rakesh Bapat; Richa Pallod
- Edited by: Sanjay Sankla
- Music by: Nikhil-Vinay
- Production company: Inspired Movies
- Release date: 13 August 2004
- Country: India
- Language: Hindi

Kaun Hai Jo Sapno Mein Aaya (transl. Who Is The One Who Comes in My Dreams) is a 2004 Indian Hindi-language romantic movie directed by Rajesh Bhatt and produced by Vibha Ragani. It stars Rakesh Bapat and Richa Pallod.

== Plot ==
Kuldeep Khanna, who lives in London, agrees to look after Mahek, the niece of his friend Dr. Verma, while she comes to London for a month-long stay. She begins to teach the household members about Indian traditions and helps reform the household. Meanwhile, Khanna's son, Sunny, falls in love with her and proposes that they get married. She turns his request down, saying that she is seeing someone else. Soon Mahek becomes unpopular with the Khannas. Finally, Sunny discovers the truth behind her rejection: she suffers from an incurable disease and does not want to create trouble for Sunny and his family.

== Cast ==
- Rakesh Bapat as Sunny K. Khanna
- Richa Pallod as Mahek
- Anupam Kher as Dr. Verma
- Kader Khan as Kuldeep Khanna
- Sheela Sharma as Bantho Patel
- Navneet Nishan as Mrs. Kuldeep Khanna
- Vineeta Malik as Mrs. Khanna
- Usha Bachani as Pramila Khanna
- Reshmee Doolub as Sweety Khanna
- Rana Jung Bahadur as Kartar Singh
- Saeed Jaffrey
- Zohra Segal

== Production ==
Part of the film was shot in Switzerland and Cardiff.

== Music ==
The music were composed by Nikhil-Vinay. Sameer wrote the lyrics.

#	Title	Singer(s)
1	"Kaun Hai Jo Sapno Mein Aaya"	Udit Narayan, Anuradha Paudwal
2	"Mera Sona Sajan"	Udit Narayan, Sneha Pant
3	"Tere Chehre Pe Marta Hoon"	Kumar Sanu, Anuradha Paudwal
4	"Agar Dil Kahe"	Sonu Nigam, Shreya Ghoshal
5	"Sabke Chehron Mein"	Udit Narayan
6	"Bheegti Aankhon Se"	Sonu Nigam, Anuradha Paudwal
7	"Hare Hare Rama"	Javed Ali, Nisha
8	"Dupatta Sarak Raha Hai"	Udit Narayan, Alka Yagnik

== Reception ==
Taran Adarsh of IndiaFM gave the film one out of five, writing, ″Rakesh Bapat plays the lover-boy part with ease. He seems to be improving with every film. Richa Pallod is a revelation and carries the film on her shoulders. Even she seems to have improved considerably vis-?is her previous works. Amongst character actors, Kader Khan is alright. Anupam Kher is outstanding. Usha Bachani gets no scope. Ditto for Navneet Nishan. Vinita Malik hams throughout. The remaining cast [family members] are non-actors. On the whole, KAUN HAI JO SAPNO MEIN AAYA is a DULL AFFAIR.
