= Pellam Pichodu =

- DVD cover
- Directed by: Jonnavithhula Ramalingeswara Rao
- Written by: Jonnavithhula Ramalingeswara Rao
- Produced by: Rampalli Ramabhadra Sastry; Boggaram Venkata Srinivas
- Starring: Rajendra Prasad; Richa; Srujana
- Cinematography: T. Surendra Reddy
- Edited by: Ramesh
- Music by: Rajendra Prasad
- Production company: Sri Gayatri Cinema
- Release date: 14 October 2005
- Running time: 131 mins
- Country: India
- Language: Telugu

Pellam Pichodu (transl. Crazy of Wife) is a 2005 Telugu-language comedy film, produced by Rampalli Ramabhadra Sastry, Venkata Srinivas Boggaram on banner and directed by Jonnavithhula Ramalingeswara Rao. Starring Rajendra Prasad, Richa, Srujana and music also composed by Rajendra Prasad.

== Cast ==
- Rajendra Prasad as Srinivas / Srinu
- Richa as Priya
- Srujana as Madhavi
- Dharmavarapu Subramanyam as Murali Krishna
- Giri Babu as House Owner
- Raghu Babu as Raghu
- Rami Reddy as Seth Kishanlal
- Surya as Srinu's boss
- Satyam Rajesh as Kitta Govindam
- Siva Reddy as Srinu's friend
- Ramana Murthy as Srinivas' father
- Vizag Prasad as Madhavi's father
- Ananth
- KK Sarma as Priest
- Shankar Melkote as Priya's boss
- Gundu Sudarshan
- Junior Relangi
- Annapurna as Srinu's mother
- Telangana Sakunthala as Ranganayaki
- Hema as Lakshmi
- Rajitha as Parvati
- Surekha Vani as Anchor
- Jyothi as Saraswati
- Anitha Chowdary as Manjula
- Padma Jayanthi

== Soundtrack ==
Pellam Pichodu

Film score by Rajendra Prasad
- Released: 10 May 2005
- Recorded: 2005
- Genre: Soundtrack
- Length: 19:02
- Producer: Rajendra Prasad

Music composed by Rajendra Prasad. Lyrics were written by Jonnavithhula Ramalingeswara Rao. Music released on Music Company.

No.	Title	Singer(s)	Length
1.	"Abba Entabbayi"	S. P. Balasubrahmanyam, Sunitha	3:54
2.	"Entho Missaipoyedanni"	S. P. Balasubrahmanyam, Usha	4:06
3.	"Naa Prema Hindustanu"	S. P. Balasubrahmanyam, Chaitra	4:31
4.	"Rupaayive"	S. P. Balasubrahmanyam	4:33
5.	"Pellam Pichodu"	Pranavi	2:02
Total length:			19:02

== Awards ==
Nandi Awards - 2005

- Best Popular Feature Film - Gold - Rampalli Ramabhadra Sastry
- Best Male Playback Singer - S. P. Balasubrahmanyam
