= Koi Mere Dil Mein Hai =

- Directed by: Deepak Ramsay
- Screenplay by: Humayun Mirza
- Produced by: Arjan Das; Mahesh Kumar
- Starring: Priyanshu Chatterjee; Dia Mirza
- Music by: Nikhil-Vinay
- Release date: 3 June 2005 (India)
- Country: India
- Language: Hindi
- Budget: ₹3.50 crore
- Box office: ₹47 lakh

Koi Mere Dil Mein Hai is a 2005 Indian film directed by Deepak Ramsay. It stars Priyanshu Chatterjee, Raqesh Bapat, Neha Bajpai and Dia Mirza in pivotal roles.

== Plot ==
The wealthy Malhotra family consists of Vikram, his wife, and his son, Raj. They would like Raj to marry their friend, Ishwarchand Mangatram Gore's only U.S.-based daughter, Simran. But Raj is intent on finding his very own soulmate, which he does with his sister's tutor, Asha, who comes from a poor family and is refusing to accept any advances from him. On the other hand, Simran too refuses to marry Raj, as she is in love with Sameer, an up-and-coming singer. When Simran is summoned to India and introduced to Raj, both plan to get their marriage cancelled. While both attempt to win their sweethearts, they find that Sameer is Asha's betrothed. Both Simran and Raj must now come up with a plan, so separate the two - and they eventually succeed. Raj's marriage is fixed with Asha. On the marriage eve, a guilty Raj confessed to Sameer about how he and Simran had managed to separate him from Asha. Sameer forgives Raj and asks him to go ahead with this marriage, and he also requests that he doesn't reveal the truth to Asha as it may break her completely. Simran, who is also ashamed and guilty, confesses to Sameer that she has realized her true love for Raj, though it is too late. After the marriage, Raj confesses to Asha that he has realized his true feelings for Simran, only to be surprised that the bride behind the veil is Simran and he has married Simran, not Asha. When Simran confessed her feelings for Raj in front of Sameer, Raj's father had overheard their conversation, and it was his plan to swap the bride. The film ends with Sameer and Asha's union, and they eventually forgive Raj and Simran.

== Cast ==
- Priyanshu Chatterjee as Raj Malhotra
- Dia Mirza as Simran Gore
- Kader Khan as Vikram Malhotra
- Rakesh Bapat as Sameer Khan
- Neha Bajpai as Asha Thakur
- Reema Lagoo as Mrs. Vikram Malhotra
- Sadashiv Amrapurkar as Ishwarchand Mangatram Gore (I.M. Gore)
- Dinesh Hingoo as Ramu
- Himani Shivpuri as Mrs. Ishwarchand Mangatram Gore
- Rita Bhaduri as Asha's mother
- Amrita Prakash as Soni Malhotra- Raj's sister

== Soundtrack ==
This album is composed by Nikhil-Vinay. Most popular songs in "Na Dil Ko Lagate Na Hairan Hote" & "Koi Mere Dil Mein Hai" etc.

#	Title	Singer(s)	Lyrics
1.	"Na Dil Ko Lagate Na Hairan Hote"	Udit Narayan, Anuradha Paudwal	Faaiz Anwar
2.	"Koi Mere Dil Mein Hai"	Kumar Sanu, Anuradha Paudwal	Faaiz Anwar
3.	"Baahon Mein Nahin Rehna"	Adnan Sami, Asha Bhosle	Faaiz Anwar
4.	"Koi Mere Dil Mein Hai"	Instrumental	
5.	"Mujhse Dosti Karoge"	Udit Narayan, Anuardha Paudwal	Faaiz Anwar
6.	"Koi To Tere Chand Se"	Udit Narayan	Sameer
7.	"Shararati Shararati"	Shaan	Faaiz Anwar
8.	"Car Wash Music"	Hema Sardesai	Faaiz Anwar
