= Faezeh Jalali =

Indian–Iranian actress, director, writer, producer, activist (b. 1980)

- فائزه جلالی
- Born: 1980 (age 45–46); Mumbai, Maharashtra, India
- Education: Beloit College (B.A., 2001); University of Tennessee (M.F.A., 2004)
- Occupations: Actress; director; writer; producer; activist
- Years active: 2005–present

Faezeh Jalali (Persian: فائزه جلالی, romanized: Fā'iza Jalālīborn 1980) is an Indian–Iranian actress, director, writer, producer and activist. She is known for Slumdog Millionaire (2008), Shaitan (2011) and the play Jaal (2012).

== Personal life and education ==
She is a fourth generation Iranian born in 1980 to an Iranian Muslim family residing in India and grew up in Mumbai, Maharashtra. After schooling at J.B. Petit High School for Girls, she attended Beloit College in Beloit, Wisconsin, United States, where she studied theatre arts and also took pre-medical background classes for dental school. Jalali joined the theatre and went on to obtain a Master of Fine Arts at the University of Tennessee and Clarence Brown Theatre at Knoxville, Tennessee.

== Career ==
Jalali's theatre acting performances include, Mira Nair's stage musical Monsoon Wedding, I Don’t Like It, As You Like It and other productions such as Jatinga, The Djinns of Eidgah, Thook, A Midsummer Night’s Dream, Arms and the Man, The Trestle at Popelick Creek. She also directed her own plays such as 07/07/07 and Shikhandi - The Story of the In-betweens, which won the Best Ensemble Cast at the Mahindra Excellence in Theatre Awards (META) 2016 and 2018 for which Jalali was also nominated for the Best Director.

She also played roles in movies such as Slumdog Millionaire and Kurbaan and was part of the Indian action-thriller television series 24.

== Sports ==
Jalali is a trained acrobatic aerialist. She represented Iran at the 1st Mallakhamb World Championships which was held at Mumbai in 2019. She participated in the rope category.

== Filmography ==
=== Films ===
Her work as an actress includes films such as:

List of film credits
Year	Title	Role	Language
2005	Mr Ya Miss	Suzy	Hindi
2008	Slumdog Millionaire	Newsreader	English
2009	Kurbaan	Anjum	Hindi
2009	The President Is Coming	Nun	English
2013	Qissa	Baali	Punjabi
2016	Phobia	Psychiatrist	Hindi

=== Television ===
List of television credits
Year	Title	Role	Language
2010	Mahi Way	Sona	Hindi
2011	Best of Luck Nikki	Tina	Hindi
2013	24	Jia	Hindi
2017	Karrle Tu Bhi Mohabbat	Romila Chhetri	Hindi
2019	Kaafir	Mastani	Hindi
2019–20	Hostages	Sarah George	Hindi
2020	A Suitable Boy	Mrs. Sahgal	English
2022	Eternally Confused and Eager for Love	Pushpa	English

=== Theatre ===
Director

- Jaal (2012)
- Shikhandi (2016)
- 07/07/07 (2016)
