= Naam Gum Jaayega =

- Directed by: Amol Shetge
- Written by: Amol Shetge
- Produced by: Shaila Suresh Pai
- Starring: Raqesh Vashisth; Dia Mirza; Divya Dutta; Mandira Bedi; Aryan Vaid
- Cinematography: Shirish Desai
- Edited by: Sanjay Sankla
- Music by: Anand Milind
- Release date: 27 August 2004
- Running time: 145 minutes
- Country: India
- Language: Hindi
- Budget: ₹1.50 crore
- Box office: ₹3.50 lakh

Naam Gum Jaayega is a 2004 Indian Hindi romantic drama film, written and directed by Amol Shetge. It stars Raqesh Vashisth and Dia Mirza. The film performed very poorly at the box office and was termed "Disaster" by Boxofficeindia.com.

== Plot ==
Natasha and Vishal Saxena meet during a college hike in the mountains.They fall in love, but Vishal asks for six months apart before marriage. They agree not to contact each other and reunite at the same hill after six months. Natasha returns after six months, but Vishal doesn’t show up she visited his house only to learn Natasha encounters Professor Chandramohan Xeno, who lusts after her. She flees, only to meet occult investigators Aryan Srivastav and Divya.

They try to help her, but Vishal shockingly claims Natasha died in a car accident six months earlier. Police discover Professor Xeno's body, and suspicion falls on Natasha. Aryan and Divya investigate her past, trying to uncover whether she is truly Natasha or someone concealing her identity.

== Cast ==
- Raqesh Vashisth as Vishal Saxena
- Dia Mirza as Natasha / Geetanjali
- Aryan Vaid as Aryan Srivastav
- Mandira Bedi as Nalini Sen
- Divya Dutta as Divya
- Sandeep Mehta as Professor Chandramohan Xeno
- Anil Nagrath as Father Ribeiro

== Soundtrack ==
All lyrics are written by Praveen Bharadwaj; all music is composed by Anand Milind.

Songs
No.	Title	Playback	Length
1.	"Us Ladki Pe Dil Aaya Hai"	Kumar Sanu, Anuradha Paudwal	5:43
2.	"Hame Tumse Hai Pyaar Kitna"	Anuradha Paudwal	6:47
3.	"Hai Sama Pyar Ka"	Udit Narayan, Shreya Ghoshal	7:05
4.	"Kabhi Ye Na Poochhna"	Udit Narayan, Anuradha Paudwal	6:45
5.	"Tumse Milke Mujhe Aisa Lagata Hai Kyon"	Sadhana Sargam, Suresh Wadkar	5:28
6.	"Teri Palkein Jo Uthi"	Babul Supriyo	6:11
7.	"Hame Tumse Hai Pyaar Kitna"	(Instrumental)	4:02
