= Tumse Milke Wrong Number =

2003 Hindi thriller film

- Directed by: Jignesh M. Vaishnav
- Written by: Rakesh Prasad
- Produced by: Monoj Chaturbedi; Sanjay Chaturbedi
- Starring: Tinnu Anand; Parvin Dabas; Richa Pallod; Rinku Ghosh; Tej Sapru; Rakesh Bapat
- Cinematography: Indrajit Bansal
- Release date: 12 December 2003
- Running time: 121 minutes
- Country: India
- Language: Hindi

Tumse Milke Wrong Number is a 2003 Indian Hindi suspense thriller film of Bollywood, directed by Jignesh M. Vaishnav. This movie was released on 12 December 2003 under the banner of ABC Pictures Private Limited.

== Plot ==
Mahi Mathur is a beautiful college student who likes to enjoy life with her friends. She has a group of jovial students like Karan, Arti, and Monti who always make people fools by telephone calls. One day a boy, Raj, entrapped by their wrong number call, came to meet with them. But Raj is more intelligent than they thought. Mahi falls in love with Raj. Karan also loves Mahi but could not express his feelings to Mahi. Mahi's father, Dr. Mathur, is a professor of psychology at the college and has another stepson, Aditya, a police officer. Although Aditya thinks that Dr. Mathur is responsible for his social agony, Mahi likes him as her elder brother. One day while Mathur was taking an online class with his student Arti, someone killed him. Arti saw the killer's face in the webcam. Before disclosing the name, the killer murdered Arti. Aditya investigates the case and suspects Karan since Dr. Mathur rejected his scholarship in spite of having good results. Arti's gambler uncle recovers the webcam record and finds out the killer. He tries to blackmail him and subsequently gets murdered. At the time of the murder, Monti took an accidental snap of the killer and discovered that Raj was the killer. Now Raj tries to finish Monti also. Aditya saves Monti and sends him to the hospital. The killer Raj finally attacks Mahi. He reveals that he was a psychological patient and has a dark past.

== Cast ==
- Richa Pallod as Mahi Mathur
- Parvin Dabas as Karan
- Rakesh Bapat as Raj
- Tinnu Anand as Arti's uncle
- Rinku Ghosh as Arti
- Vrajesh Hirjee as Monti
- Yash Tonk as Inspector Aditya
- Benjamin Gilani as Dr. Mathur

== Music ==
Tumse Milke-Wrong Number is a Hindi album released on 27 Sep 2003. This album is composed by Daboo Malik. Album has 8 songs sung by Anuradha Paudwal, Kumar Sanu, Sunidhi Chauhan, Babul Supriyo, Abhijeet Bhattacharya & Daboo Malik. Most popular songs in album "Jab Tak Tum Saamne Rahoge" & "Kal Hum Jis Se" etc.

#	Song title	Singer(s)	Length
1.	"Jab Tak Tum Saamne Rahoge"	Anuradha Paudwal & Kumar Sanu	06:49
2.	"Dil Sunta Hai" (Female)	Anuradha Paudwal	05:26
3.	"Kal Hum Jis Se"	Anuradha Paudwal & Kumar Sanu	05:58
4.	"Jab Tak Tum Saamne Rahoge"	Instrumental	06:50
5.	"Kabhi Koi Chehra"	Anuradha Paudwal & Babul Supriyo	04:52
6.	"Dil Sunta Hai" (Male)	Abhijeet Bhattacharya	09:07
7.	"Rafta Rafta"	Daboo Malik & Sunidhi Chauhan	05:31
8.	"Wrong Number" (Title Song)	Daboo Malik & Sunidhi Chauhan	03:47

== Reception ==
Taran Adarsh of IndiaFM gave the film 1 out of 5, writing ″Rakesh Bapat hams to the hilt. Also, he looks tired at some places and fresh in some. There's inconsistency in his looks. Parvin Dabas gets no scope. Richa Pallod is quite nice. Rinku Ghosh looks alluring and makes her presence felt. Vrajesh Hirjee plays to the gallery. Yash Tonk is alright. Tinnu Anand and Benjamin Gilani have nothing worthwhile to do. On the whole, WRONG NUMBER just does not connect with the viewer. A dull fare, it faces an uphill task due to weak merits and a poor opening.″ Sukanya Verma of Rediff.com wrote ″Wrong Number fails to work as a murder mystery for want of thrills and tense moments. It is bland mood right from the beginning to the end. That is by large the only consistent aspect of Wrong Number.″
