= Kaafir (Indian TV series) =

- Web series poster
- Genre: Drama; Thriller
- Written by: Bhavani Iyer
- Directed by: Sonam N.air
- Starring: Dia Mirza; Mohit Raina; Dara Sandhu
- Theme music composer: Ravi Singhal
- Composers: Background Score: Raju Singh
- Country of origin: India
- Original languages: Hindi; Urdu
- No. of seasons: 1
- No. of episodes: 8 (list of episodes)

Production
- Producer: Siddharth P. Malhotra
- Production location: India
- Cinematography: Pratik Shah
- Editor: Yashashwini Y.P.
- Running time: 40 mins approx.
- Production companies: Alchemy Films; Miracle Pictures

Original release
- Network: ZEE5
- Release: 15 June 2019

Kaafir (transl. Infidel) is a 2019 Indian streaming television series directed by Sonam Nair. Written by Bhavani Iyer, the series follows Kainaaz Akhtar, a woman from Pakistan-administered Kashmir who accidentally crosses the Line-of-Control (LOC), and ends up in Kashmir, India where is held prisoner under the suspicion of being a militant. After giving birth to a child while spending seven years imprisoned, Kainaaz and her daughter are helped by an Indian journalist, who seeks to bring them justice. It is inspired by the true story of Shehnaz Parveen. Starring Dia Mirza and Mohit Raina, all 8 episodes premiered on 15 June 2019 on the streaming platform ZEE5.

== Cast ==
- Dia Mirza as Kainaaz Akhtar
- Mohit Raina as Vedant Rathod
- Umar Sharif as Mohd. Siddiqi
- Dara Sandhu as Rafique
- Abhiroy Singh as Dhruv Rathod
- Suhail Sidhwani as Veer Rathod
- Dishita Jain as Seher
- Meenal Kapoor as public prosecutor
- Faezeh Jalali as Mastani

== Episodes ==
No. overall	No. in season	Title	Directed by	Written by	Original release date
1	1	"The First Meeting"	Sonam Nair	Bhavani Iyer	15 June 2019
2	2	"A Tale of Retrospection"	Sonam Nair	Bhavani Iyer	15 June 2019
3	3	"Truth and Lies"	Sonam Nair	Bhavani Iyer	15 June 2019
4	4	"Judgement Day"	Sonam Nair	Bhavani Iyer	15 June 2019
5	5	"Redemption and Retribution"	Sonam Nair	Bhavani Iyer	15 June 2019
6	6	"Where Do We Belong?"	Sonam Nair	Bhavani Iyer	15 June 2019
7	7	"A Final Try"	Sonam Nair	Bhavani Iyer	15 June 2019
8	8	"The Last Goodbye"	Sonam Nair	Bhavani Iyer	15 June 2019

== Production ==
Kaafir is set in Jammu and Kashmir, and was shot almost entirely in Himachal Pradesh.

== Reception ==
The series received mixed to positive reviews.
