= Inkosaari =

- Poster
- Directed by: Suman Pathuri
- Written by: Raj & DK; Sita Menon
- Produced by: Kalyan Palla; Ravi Pendekanti
- Dialogue by: Nagaraju Gandham
- Starring: Raja; Manjari Phadnis; Richa Pallod
- Cinematography: Ranganath Babu G.
- Edited by: K.V. Krishna Reddy
- Music by: Mahesh Shankar
- Production company: Bay Movies
- Release date: 26 February 2010
- Running time: 130 minutes
- Country: India
- Language: Telugu

Inkosaari (transl. Once again) is a 2010 Indian Telugu film, directed by Suman Pathuri. Produced by Kalyan Palla, it stars Raja, Manjari Phadnis and Richa Pallod. Pathuri won the Nandi Award for Best First Film of a Director and Vennela Kishore won Nandi Award for Best Male Comedian. The film was a box office failure.

== Plot ==
Ajay, Shruti, Bala, Deepa, Sudhakar, and Vicky are like any other gang in college. When they are at the brink of graduating, Vicky proposes an idea, and they all decide to meet at least once every year for the rest of their lives. However, with time, all of them get entangled in their own world until Ajay lands in India from the US one fine day. He convinces all his friends for a seven-day reunion vacation to relive their college days. What transpires during this time forms the rest of the story.

== Cast ==
- Raja as Ajay
- Manjari Phadnis as Shruthi
- Richa Pallod as Deepa
- Vennela Kishore as Bala Bokkala
- Ravi Varma as Sudhakar Reddy
- Saandip as Vicky
- Harish Koyalagundla as Pawan
- Bharath Raju as Krishnadevarayalu
- Rao Ramesh as Revanth
- Gollapudi Maruthi Rao as Sudhakar's father
- Saira Bhanu as Anjamma
- Bindu Madhavi as Sailaja (guest appearance)
- Sayali Bhagat (guest appearance)
- Karuna Bhushan as Sarasa
- Sandhya Janak as Shruti's mother

== Production ==
The film is directed by NRI Suman Pathuri and produced by his friends Kalyan Palla and Ravi Pendekanti. Raj & DK, with whom the director worked with as an assistant director in Flavors (2003), co-wrote the story and script.

== Music ==
The film has music composed by Mahesh Shankar.

Track listing
No.	Title	Lyrics	Singer(s)	Length
1.	"Ninnalanni"	Vanamali	Rahul Nambiar	5:23
2.	"Hey Hey Everybody"	Viswa	Rita Thyagarajan	4:50
3.	"Vaadey Na Vaadu"	Vanamali	Shweta Pandit	5:13
4.	"Inkosaari"	Vanamali	Hariharan	4:42
5.	"Life Ae Oka Saturday"	Anantha Sriram	Kalyani, Prasanna	4:44
6.	"Theme Of Inkosaari"	—	Mrinalini	2:23
Total length:				27:15
