= Munmun Dhalaria =

Indian documentary filmmaker

Munmun Dhalari
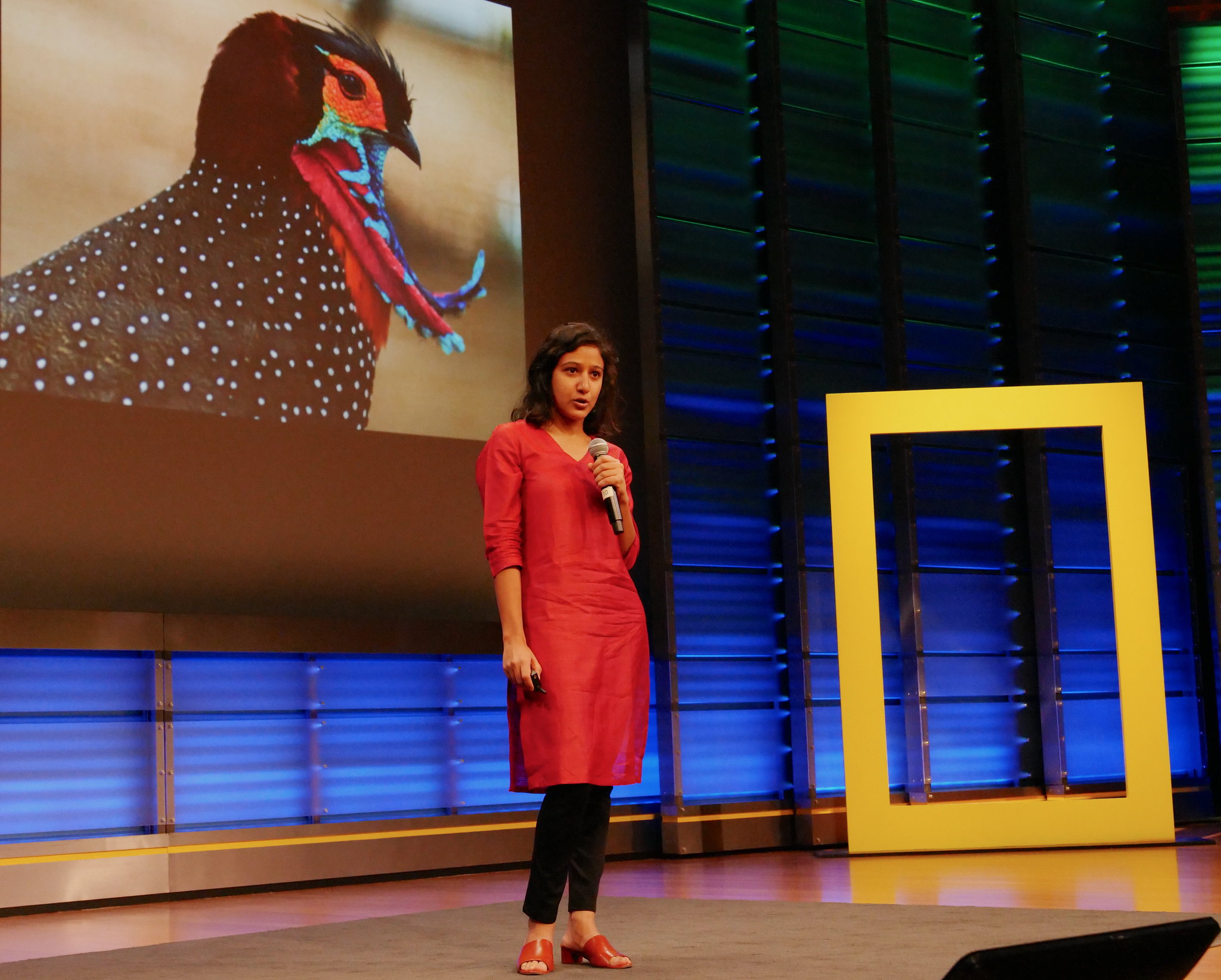
- Munmun Dhalaria presenting her work at National Geographic Headquarters at Washington DC, USA in 2019
- Born: 24 July 1991 (age 35); Dhinjon, Assam
- Citizenship: Indian
- Education: Delhi University, Tata Institute of Social Sciences, Kendriya Vidyalaya (Bangalore)
- Known for: Documentary Filmmaker
- Parent: Father:Gp. Capt. Jagdish Chand Dhalaria Mother:Manjula Dhalaria
- Website: https://www.munmundhalaria.com/

Munmun Dhalaria is a documentary filmmaker from Dharamshala, currently based in Bangalore India. She is known for making documentaries on wildlife conservation, gender and human rights. Her films have been broadcast on networks like National Geographic, Hotstar and Vice World News. Since 2017, Dhalaria has been associated with the National Geographic Society as a National Geographic Explorer. Her photographs have been published internationally in various scientific journals and magazines like National Geographic Magazine. She has also worked as an assistant producer in Bristol, UK with Wildstar films, working for Emmy awarded shows like ‘Queens’, ‘Animals up close with Bertie Gregory’, and Disney’s ‘Tigers on the Rise’. She is also a Hatha Yoga teacher.

== Early life and education ==
Munmun is the daughter of (retd.) Gp. Capt. Jagdish Chand Dhalaria, officer with the Indian Air Force. She belongs to a small hamlet called Gahra in Mandi district of Himachal Pradesh in Western Himalaya. Her mother Manjula Dhalaria belongs to Hamirpur district and primarily grew up in Shimla, the capital of Himachal Pradesh. She grew up with one sibling- her elder brother Rishabh Dhalaria, who is a manager at Bank of Baroda.

She studied in several Air Force schools and Kendriya Vidyalayas at different places in India owing to her fathers’ job. During her high school at Kendriya Vidyalaya, Yelahanka, Bangalore she was selected for AFS foreign exchange program in Massachusetts, US, which involved in radio telemetry research on coy apart from her other high school activities. Dhalaria has done her bachelor's degree in mass media and mass communication from Delhi University and MA in media and cultural studies from Tata Institute of Social Sciences, She has also done her Basic Mountaineering Course with the Indian Army.

== Filmography ==
Year	Title	Role	Genre	Notes	Ref
2026	In The Heart Of The Tide	Director	Documentary for Aga Khan Development Network		
2025	Guardians: Snow Leopard Of The Himalayas	Director	Documentary		
2024	Hungry For Love ~ Simranpreet’s Story	Director	Documentary		
2024	Seeing Red ~ Saving Red Pandas	Director	Documentary for Aga Khan Development Network Broadcast on Al Jazeera		
2022	Heroin In The Himalayas	Director	Documentary for Vice Media		
2022	Written Out Of History	Director	Documentary		
2021	No Water No Village (Chhu Med Na Yul)	Director	Documentary	International Film Festival of India, 2022 Alt Eff Film Festival	
2021	Tenzin Tsundue	Director	News Documentary for Vice		
2021	Inside The Opioid Crisis Gripping This Himalayan State | Trouble in Paradise	Director, editor	Documentary		
2021	Written out of History- Forgotten Indian Scientists	Director, DOP	Documentary Series		
2021	Ladakh Pashmina	Director	Documentary for Nature Conservation Foundation		
2020	Jujurana's Kingdom	Director	Documentary for National Geographic	IMF Mountain Film Festival BANFF Mountain Film and Book Festival, 2020.	
2020	On the Brink, season 2	Assistant director, Camera	TV series for Hotstar		
2020	Covid Response ~ A Himalayan Story	Director	Documentary for National Geographic	Liberation Docfest Bangladesh 2021 Centre of South Asian Studies, University of Michigan, 2021	
2017	Tayiya Kanasu	Director, Camera	Documentary	Best Documentary at the 6th Aarogya Film Festival Health Systems research global symposium 2018, Liverpool, UK Honorable mention, Public Health Film Festival, Oxford India Heritage walks Film festival	
2017	An Uncertain Winter	Director	Documentary for SPS Community Media / PSBT	Winner of ICIMOD Mountain film Award at KIMFF, Kathmandu, Nepal IMF mountain film festival, New Delhi Pakistan International Mountain Film Festival CMS Vatavaran Film festival, New Delhi Kathmandu International Film Festival	
2016	Raag Aur Bhraag (Music And Leopards)				
2014	Padmini My love (Padmini meri jaan)				
2013	Mahatma Phule Vyayam Shala				
