= Raqesh Bapat =

Indian film and television actor (born 1978)

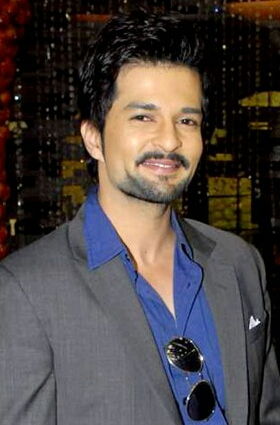
- Bapat in 2012
- Born: Rakesh Bapat; 1 September 1978 (age 48); Amravati, Maharashtra, India
- Other name: Rakesh Vashisht
- Occupations: Actor; Model
- Years active: 2001–present
- Spouse: Riddhi Dogra (m. 2011; div. 2019)

Raqesh Bapat is an Indian actor and model. He is known for his work in films like Tum Bin, Koi Mere Dil Mein Hai, Vrundavan and Savita Damodar Paranjape and television shows like Saat Phere – Saloni Ka Safar, Maryada: Lekin Kab Tak? and Qubool Hai. He was ranked 16th in The Times of India's Top 20 Most Desirable Men of Maharashtra in 2017. He also participated in Bigg Boss OTT 1, Bigg Boss 15 and Bigg Boss Marathi 6.

== Early and personal life ==
Raqesh Bapat was born on September 1, 1978, in Amravati, Maharashtra, India. He won the National Award at the junior level for his painting.

He was married to Riddhi Dogra in 2011 but they divorced in 2019. He started dating Shamita Shetty in September 2021, who was his connection in Bigg Boss OTT. The couple broke up in July 2022.

== Career ==
=== Bollywood, 2001–2005 ===
He was given his first role, Amar Shah in the movie Tum Bin (2001), after the director's wife noticed him in a toothpaste ad and recommended him to her husband. He next played Gaurav in Dil Vil Pyar Vyar (2002). He then appeared in the suspense thriller Tumse Milke Wrong Number (2003) directed by Jignesh M. Vaishnav, in Kaun Hai Jo Sapno Mein Aaya (2004), directed by Rajesh Bhatt; in Naam Gum Jaayega, a romantic drama written and directed by Amol Shetge; and in the critically panned Koi Mere Dil Mein Hai (2005), directed by Deepak Ramsay.

=== Television, 2005–2012 ===
Bapat began his television career in 2005 with the Sphere Origins Hindi television drama Saat Phere – Saloni Ka Safar from 2005 to 2008. He was nominated for the Indian Telly Award for Best Actor in a Negative Role.

Bapat appeared in two films in 2006: Jai Santoshi Maa, directed by Ahmed Siddiqui which also starred Nushrat Bharucha in the lead role, and Jaadu Sa Chal Gaya, directed by Dev Basu.

In 2008, Bapat played the role of Anuj, in a show presented by Hats Off Productions, aired on Imagine TV's Ek Packet Umeed. The show depicted the tale of all genres of women living under one roof and Raqesh playing the sole man in the serial. The show was named Best Weekly Programme at The Indian Telly Awards.

In 2010, Bapat appeared in the show Seven- The Ashvamedha Prophecy, an Indian supernatural television series that aired on Sony Entertainment Television. The series was produced by Yash Chopra. Bapat played the role of Shlok, the male guardian of Seven. Seven was the story of the search for the seven descendants and their journey of discovering their real capabilities. The show won three Telly Awards and an ITA award.

From 2010 to 2012, Bapat played the male protagonist Aditya Singh Jakhar in Maryada: Lekin Kab Tak?, an Indian television drama on Star Plus. The show revolves around the lives of four women of the Jhakar family and the darker realities of their relationships.

=== 2012–present ===
Bapat made a comeback in films after six years in 2012, with a releases: a Hindi and a Marathi film. He starred in Heroine, a drama directed, written, and co-produced by Madhur Bhandarkar.

He then made his Marathi film debut with Aayna ka Bayna, a dance film directed by Samit Kakkad. The film also starred Sachin Khedekar and Amruta Khanvilkar.

Bapat also appeared in Hongey Judaa Na Hum, a television drama series which premiered on Sony Entertainment Television India. He played a lead of Rohan Mishra opposite Aamna Sharif.

In 2013, he took part in Nach Baliye 6, a dance, reality-television series that airs on Star Plus with his then wife Riddhi Dogra. On the show, ten television celebrity couples compete against each other.

In the same year he appeared in two films. In Gippi, a Hindi teen film, directed by Sonam Nair and produced by Karan Johar, he played the role of a chemistry teacher. He also appeared in A New Love Ishtory, a comedy drama film directed by John Matthew Matthan.

He replaced Karan Singh Grover in the lead role of Asad Ahmed Khan on Qubool Hai, which was produced by 4 Lion Films and broadcast on Zee TV in January 2014. He did not continue with the series when it took a time leap in early 2014.

He appeared in Citizen (2015), a Marathi film, along with Rajshree Landge, Yatin Karyekar, Pushkar Shrotri, and Uday Tikekar.

In 2016, he played the lead roles in two Marathi films. Vrundavan also starred many senior and celebrated actors from the Marathi film industry, including Mahesh Manjrekar, Ashok Saraf, Mohan Joshi, Sharad Ponkshe, and Uday Tikekar. Sarv Mangal Savdhan was a romantic comedy directed by Rahil Khan, in which Bapat appeared along with actress Manjari Fadnis.

In the same year he replaced Karan Grover in the lead role of scientist Shantanu Kant in Bahu Hamari Rajni Kant (2016–2017), a popular fantasy drama family show on Life OK. The show also airs on MBC 2.

Bapat starred in Savita Damodar Paranjpe in 2018. The film is a Marathi psychological thriller based on the famous 1985 Shekhar Tamhane directorial drama of the same name. It was very well received at the 11th edition of the Goa Marathi Film Festival. The audience gave a standing ovation during the screening. It also went on to screen on Netflix.

He also appeared in Tu Aashiqui (2018) which aired on Colors TV. This was a musical drama romance television show based on two lovers' efforts to unite. He played the role of Reyansh Diwan who made an entry in Pankti's life as an influential and charming businessman.

Bapat played the lead role in two Marathi films in 2019, including WhatsApp Love along with actress Anuja Sathe, and directed by Hemant Kumar Mahale. Bapat played Raja in Mumbai Apli Ahe (2019), a film directed by Bharat Sunanda, set in the Mumbai of the 90s and revolving around Raja, who starts as small criminal and grows up to become a notorious don in the city.

He also starred in Forever (2019), a romantic thriller film directed by Vinay Tiwari along with Nisha Aliya.

In 2021, Bapat appeared in the reality show Bigg Boss OTT and emerged as the third runner-up. Next, he entered Bigg Boss 15 as a wildcard contestant on Day 35 but walked out of the house on Day 40 citing medical reasons.

== Pageantry ==
- Grasim Mr. India - 1999 - First runner-up
- Mister Intercontinental - First runner-up in Germany

== Filmography ==
=== Films ===
Year	Title	Role	Language	Ref.
2001	Tum Bin	Amar Shah	Hindi	
2002	Dil Vil Pyar Vyar	Gaurav Shahapukar, Gauri's brother	Hindi	
2003	Tumse Milke Wrong Number	Raj	Hindi	
2004	Kaun Hai Jo Sapno Mein Aaya	Sunny Khanna	Hindi	
2005	Koi Mere Dil Mein Hai	Sameer	Hindi	
2005	Naam Gum Jaayega	Vishal Saxena	Hindi	
2006	Jai Maa Santoshi	Anuraag	Hindi	
2006	Jaadu Sa Chal Gaya	Rahul	Hindi	
2012	Heroine	Sameer Khan	Hindi	
2012	Aayna Ka Bayna	Saagar	Marathi	
2013	Gippi	Chemistry teacher	Hindi	
2013	A New Love Ishtory	Prince Vikram	Hindi	
2015	Citizen		Marathi	
2016	Vrundavan	Krish	Marathi	
2016	Sarv Mangal Savdhan		Marathi	
2018	Savita Damodar Paranjpe	Ashok	Marathi	
2019	WhatsApp Love	Aditya	Marathi	
2019	Mumbai Apli Ahe	Raja	Marathi	
2019	Forever		Marathi	
2022	Sarsenapati Hambirrao	Sarjah Khan	Marathi	
2024	Khurchi		Marathi	

=== Television ===
Year	Serial	Role	Notes
2005–2008	Saat Phere – Saloni Ka Safar	Neel / Neerav	
2008	Ek Packet Umeed	Anuj	
2010	Seven	Shlok	
2010–2012	Maryada: Lekin Kab Tak?	Aditya Jakhar	
2012–2013	Hongey Judaa Na Hum	Rohan Mishra	
2013	Nach Baliye 6	Contestant	6th place
2014	Qubool Hai	Asad Ahmed Khan	
2014	Simply Baatien with Raveena	Himself	Guest
2016	Yeh Hai Aashiqui	Himself	
2016–2017	Bahu Hamari Rajni Kant	Shantanu Kant	
2018	Tu Aashiqui	Reyansh Diwan	
2018	Ishq Mein Marjawan	Reyansh Diwan	Guest
2021	Bigg Boss OTT 1	Contestant	4th place
2021	Bigg Boss season 15	Contestant	Quit
2024–2025	Navri Mile Hitlerla	Abhiram Jahagirdar	Marathi Serial
2026	Bigg Boss Marathi season 6	Contestant	2nd place
2026	Tujhyakade Tula Magne		Marathi Serial

=== Web series ===
Year	Title	Role	Notes	Ref.
2021	Assi Nabbe Poore Sau	Junaid Alam		

=== Music video appearances ===
Year	Title	Singer(s)	Ref.
2022	"Tere Vich Rab Disda"	Sachet–Parampara	
