= Mohammad Reza Golzar =

Iranian actor

- محمدرضا گلزار
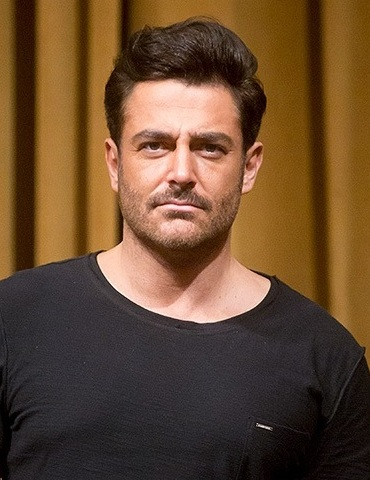
- Golzar in July 2017
- Born: 31 March 1977 (age 49); Tehran, Iran
- Education: Islamic Azad University
- Occupations: Actor, singer
- Spouse: Aysan Aghakhani (m. 2023)

Mohammad Reza Golzar (Persian: محمدرضا گلزار, born March 31, 1977) is an Iranian actor, television host, and singer.

Golzar began his career in 1998 as a guitarist with the Arian music band. He later ventured into acting, making his debut in the film Sam and Narges (2000), directed by Iraj Ghaderi. Golzar has appeared in several commercially successful Iranian films, including Hello Mumbai (2015), Side Mirror (2017), Rahman 1400 (2018), and We Are All Together (2019). In addition to his cinematic work, he has acted in several television projects, such as Romantic (2016–2017), Made in Iran 2 (2018), and Gisoo (2020–2021).

== Early life ==
Mohammadreza Golzar was born on 22 March 1977 in Tehran. He is of Azerbaijani and Persian descent. As a volleyball player, he played as a libero for teams including Tehran Province, Pars Khodro, Shisheh va Gaz, and Diheim. In the 2008 Iranian Volleyball Super League, he served as a fitness coach for the Sanat vibrations team. He had no artistic activities until the end of high school. His father opposed his playing the guitar, though he occasionally played keyboard. Golzar studied mathematics until his third year of high school and was accepted into the mechanical engineering program at the Islamic Azad University, South Tehran Branch, through the entrance exam, which he reserved. In his final year, he switched to the experimental sciences track, aiming to pursue dentistry but was not accepted and instead continued with mechanical engineering. He is a graduate of mechanical engineering from the Islamic Azad University.

Golzar began his music career in 1998 as a guitarist with the Arian band, where he also played the organ and percussion. He later co-founded the Darkoob music group with Homayoun Nasiri and others and established the Rezzar band (short for Reza Golzar), which remains active. Despite being invited to act in films by directors Mosoud Kimiai, Bahram Beyzai, and Dariush Mehrjui, Golzar was unable to participate for various reasons.

In June 2023, Golzar married Aisan Aghakhani, a model.

== Career ==
Before starting his acting career with Sam and Narges, he gained fame as the guitarist of the Iranian music band, Arian Band. He is now a singer of the Rezzar Band led by Hamed Baradaran.

In 2000, he was invited to act in Sam and Narges by Iranian director, Iraj Ghaderi. He started to gain popularity after acting in more films such as Shaam-e Akhar, Zahr-e Asal, and Boutique.

He is a graduate of Mechanical Engineering from Islamic Azad University. Golzar started his music career in 1998 as a guitarist with one of his close friends Arian Sajadi. He has played guitar, organ and percussion with Arash Rahimi.

== Filmography ==
=== Cinema ===
Year	Title	Director	Role	Notes
2019	We Are All Together	Kamal Tabrizi	Mohammadreza Golzar	
2018	Rahman 1400	Manouchehr Hadi	Ashkan Jalousi	Release halted after three weeks due to distribution of an unedited version.
2017	Side Mirror	Manouchehr Hadi	Shahrokh	
2016	Hello Bombay	Ghorban Mohammadpour	Ali	First joint production of Iranian cinema and Bollywood
2015	Drought and Lie	Pedram Alizadeh	Arash	
2014	Atomic Heart Mother	Ali Ahmadzadeh	Toofan	
2014	I Want To	Bahman Farmanara	Nima Farzaneh	Produced in 2013, received a permit after five years. Full title: I Want to Dance.
2011	Lady from the Moon	Elham Gharekhani, Amirmehrtash Mahdavi	Dr. Hamid Derakhshan	Live-action animation
2011	You and Me	Mohammad Banki	Ali	Second collaboration between Banki brothers and Mohammadreza Golzar
2010	Along the City	Ali Atshani	Mohammadreza Golzar	Third time Mohammadreza Golzar played himself; renamed from Six People Under the Rain
2010	Six and Five	Bahman Goudarzi	Sami	Renamed from Cold Sandwich
2010	Democracy in Broad Daylight	Ali Atshani	Angel of Death	
2008	Two Sisters	Mohammad Banki	Amir and Afshin	Adapted from the foreign film Two Is Too Many starring Antonio Banderas
2008	Like That Night	Shahram Mirab Aghdam	Siavash	
2007	Mad for Leyli	Ghasem Jafari	Farhad	
2007	Forced Success	Mohammad Hossein Latifi	Mohammadreza Golzar	
2007	Crow Feather	Shahram Shah Hosseini	Reza	
2005	Trap	Siroos Alvand	Farshad	
2005	Ceasefire	Tahmineh Milani	Yousef	
2005	Wedding Dinner	Ebrahim Vahidzadeh	Mohammadreza Golzar	Cameo appearance
2004	Ice Flower	Kiumars Pourahmad	Abbas	Remake of the old Iranian film Sultan of Hearts
2003	Boutique	Hamid Nematollah	Jahangir	
2002	Thirteen Cats on the Roof	Ali Abdolalizadeh	Ramo	
2002	Coma	Arash Moayerian	Amir	
2002	Black Eyes	Iraj Ghaderi	Sorena	
2002	Honey Poison	Ebrahim Sheibani	Sina	
2001	Uptown, Downtown	Akbar Khamin	Davood	
2001	Time	Hamidreza Salahmand	Saeed	
2001	Last Supper	Fereydoun Jirani	Mani	
2000	Sam and Narges	Iraj Ghaderi	Sam	

==== Web ====
Year	Title	Role	Director	Episode Count	First Broadcast	Last Broadcast	Character Name
2020	Gisoo	Actor	Manouchehr Hadi	22 episodes	March 3, 2020	July 28, 2020	Soheil Baghaei
2018	Made in Iran 2	Actor, Singer	Borzoo Niknejad	22 episodes	April 25, 2018	October 24, 2018	Jamshid (Jimi)
2016	Passionate	Actor	Manouchehr Hadi	17 episodes	February 14, 2016	2016	Soheil Baghaei
2014	Love Is Not on Holiday	Actor	Bijan Birang	26 episodes	February 26, 2014	April 29, 2014	Raha
2011	Made in Iran	Actor	Mohammad Hossein Latifi	18 episodes	March 7, 2011	August 26, 2011	Jamshid (Jimi Hendrix)

==== Hosting ====
Year	Title	Type	Producer	Network	Notes
2023–present	Pantoleague	Competition	Javad Farhani	Network 3	Golzar's second television hosting role
2021	Seven Challenges	Competition	Mehdi Maniri	Namava Website	This competition was funded by Namava.
2018	Be a Winner	Competition	Hamid Rahimi Nadi, Hashem Rezaei	Network 3	Mohammadreza Golzar's first appearance as a host on Iranian television; renamed from Millionaire Show

== Discography ==
Year	Song title	Composer	Lyricist	Arranger	Mixing and mastering	Release date	Notes
2025	You Changed	Asef Aria	Asef Aria	Moein Habibi	Mohammad Fallahi	May 13	
2024	Like Everyone Else	Mahdad Homayounpour	Mahdad Homayounpour	Mahdad Homayounpour	Milad Akbari	February 12	
2024	It Didn't Work Out in the End	Mahdad Homayounpour	Mahdad Homayounpour	Soheil Shams		December 8	
2024	Poor Me	Mahdad Homayounpour	Mahdad Homayounpour	Siemens	Siemens	November 6	
2024	You Messed It Up	Mehrad Jam	Mehrad Jam	Mehrad Jam		October 5	
2021	My Life	Milad Babaei	Ali Ilia	Mohammadreza Rahmana	Milad Farhoodi	July 1	
2020	Can You Come Back	Arsha Radin	Sepideh Soori	Ehsan Abdollahi	Ehsan Abdollahi	March 9	
2020	Save Me	Ravi	Ravi	Amirmilad Nikzad		February 2020	Theme song for the series Gisoo
2019	Beach	Kiarash	Kiarash	Puzzle Band	Puzzle Band	March 2019	
2019	You Played Me	Arn	Arn	Branush		2019	
2018	Old Love	Mohammad Abedini	Mohsen Hagh Nazari	Saeed Zamani		2018	
2018	Rain	Mohammad Abedini	Mohsen Hagh Nazari	Hossein Ghamgin		October 7	
2018	Where Should I Go	Hamed Baradaran	Hamed Baradaran, Saeed Mirzaei	Hamed Baradaran		2018	Performed with Sina Sarlak for the end credits of the series Made in Iran 2
2018	Pity	Ali Yasini	Ali Yasini	Farbod Faroughi			
2017	Don't Say Anything	Mohammad Abedini	Mohsen Hagh Nazari	Hamed Baradaran			
2017	You Hurt Me Badly	Ali Yasini	Ali Yasini	Nader Kouhestani	Hamed Baradaran		
2017	Everyone's Gone	Ardaln Hooshmand	Ardaln Hooshmand	Masoud Jahani	Masoud Jahani		
2017	You Didn't Even See Me	Ali Yasini	Ali Yasini	Hamed Baradaran	Hamed Baradaran	July 6, 2017	
2017	You're Not Here	Hamed Baradaran	Kasra Bakhtiarian	Hamed Baradaran	Hamed Baradaran		
2017	You Weren't in Love	Saha	Farjam Kheyrallahi	Farbod Faroughi	Farbod Faroughi		
2016	What's There to Hide	Milad Baran	Amin Bamshad	Hamed Baradaran	Hamed Baradaran		
2016	What's Wrong, Crazy	Arash AP	Arash AP	Masoud Jahani	Masoud Jahani		
2016	What Happened	Hamed Baradaran	Atefeh Habibi	Hamed Baradaran	Hamed Baradaran		
2016	Damn	Hamed Baradaran	Atefeh Habibi	Hamed Baradaran	Hamed Baradaran		
2016	Say Yes	Hamed Baradaran	Atefeh Habibi	Hamed Baradaran	Hamed Baradaran		
2016	Don't Say No	Hamed Baradaran	Atefeh Habibi	Hamed Baradaran	Hamed Baradaran	August 1, 2016	
2016	I Got Used to You	Hamed Baradaran	Atefeh Habibi	Hamed Baradaran	Hamed Baradaran	July 7, 2016	Performed with Hamed Baradaran
2016	My Heart Broke	Ardaln Hooshmand	Ardaln Hooshmand	Hamed Baradaran	Hamed Baradaran	June 18, 2016	
2015	Your Place Is Empty	Naser Zeynali	Pouria Motabean	Farbod Faroughi	Farbod Faroughi	November 2, 2015	
2015	How Nice Is Our World	Naser Zeynali	Ali Aria	Amir Arshia	Mohammad Fallahi	September 17, 2015	
2014	I Miss You	Naser Zeynali	Pouria Motabean	Hossein Salari Moghadam		November 20, 2014	Dedicated to Morteza Pashaei
2013	Snowy Day	Morteza Pashaei	Mehrzad Amirkhani	Saeed Zamani		March 15, 2013	Performed with Morteza Pashaei
2013	Believe You're My World	Naser Zeynali	Ali Aria	Farbod Faroughi	Ahmad Saneqeh	February 13, 2013	
2013	You Brought It to This	Naser Zeynali	Pouria Motabean	Farbod Faroughi		January 25, 2013	
