= List of Indian film directors =

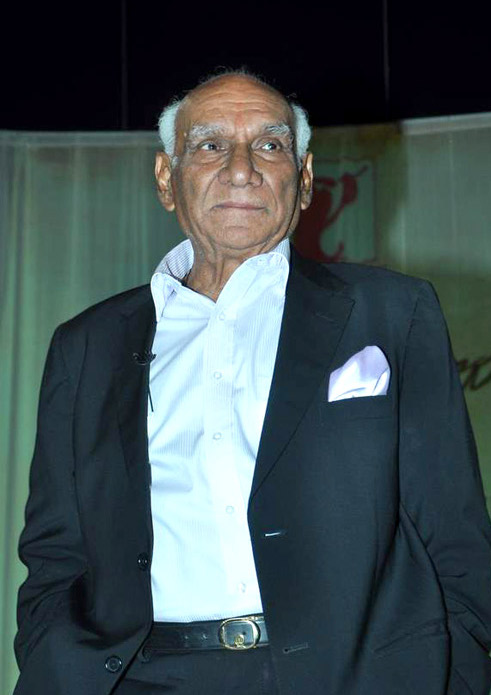
Yash Chopra (Hindi)

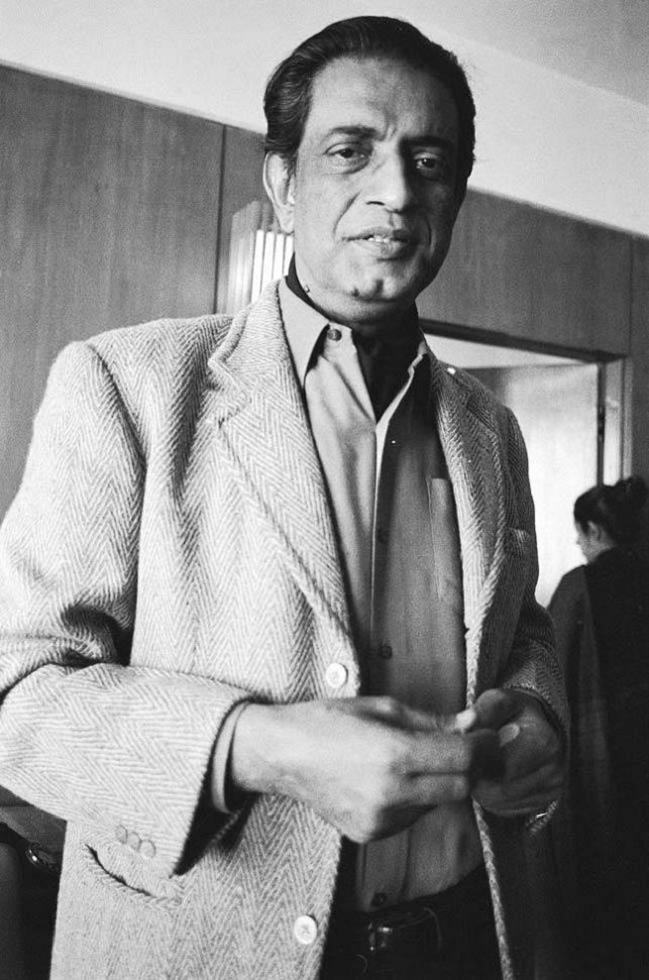
Satyajit Ray (Bengali)

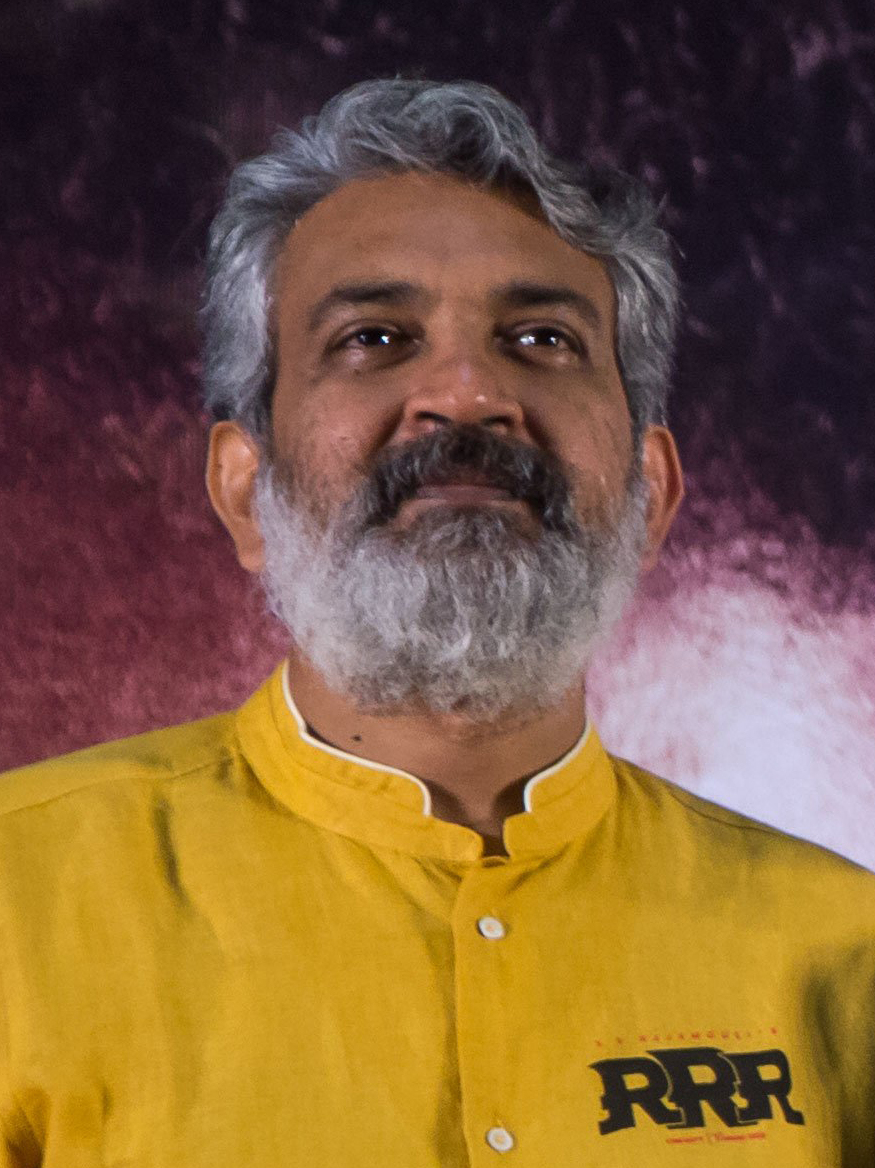
S. S. Rajamouli (Telugu)

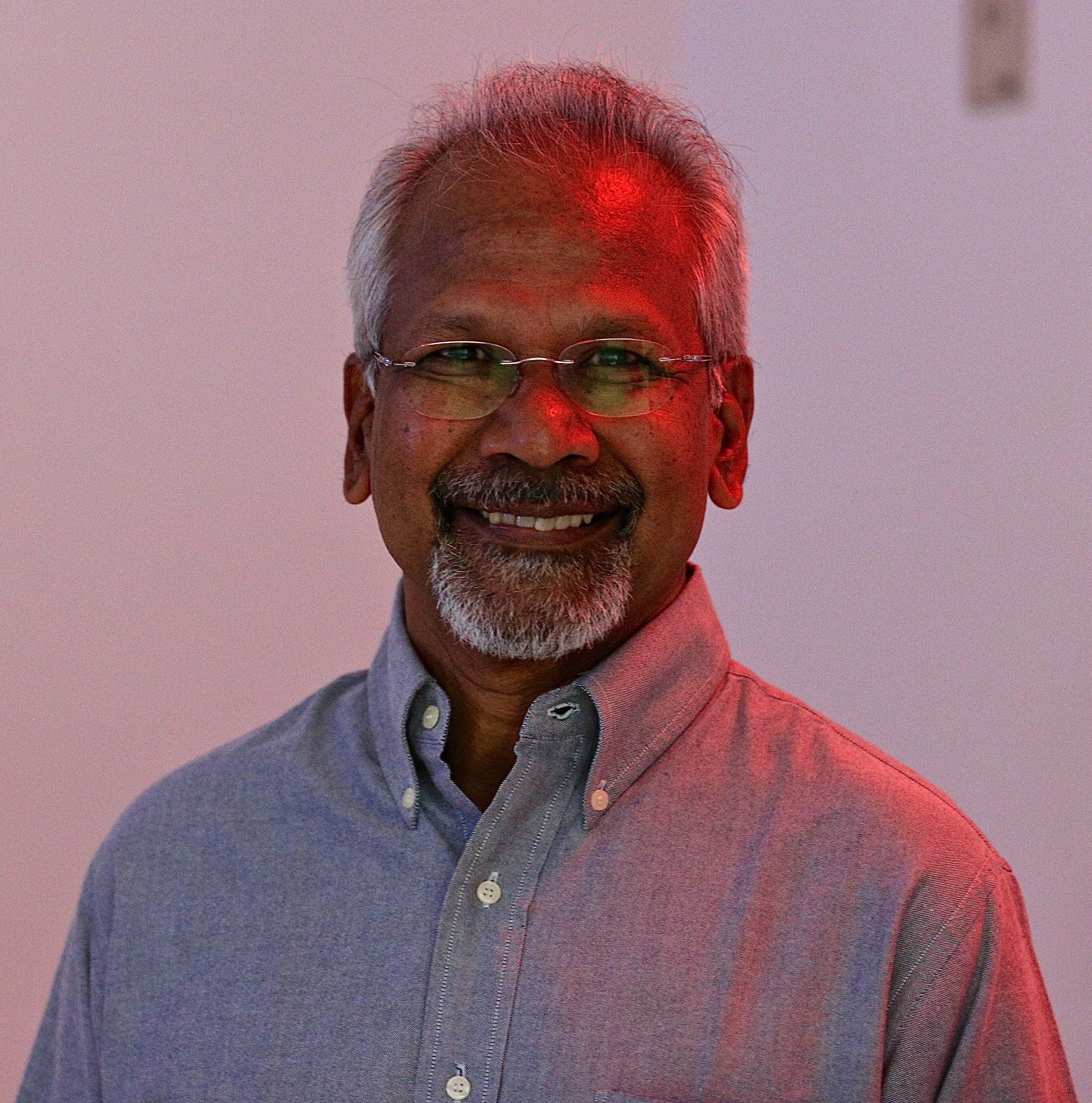
Mani Ratnam (Tamil)

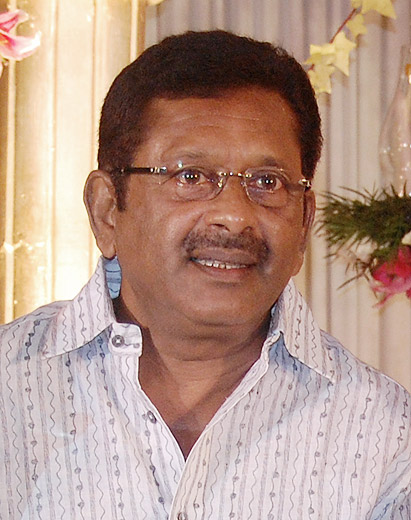
Fazil (Malayalam)

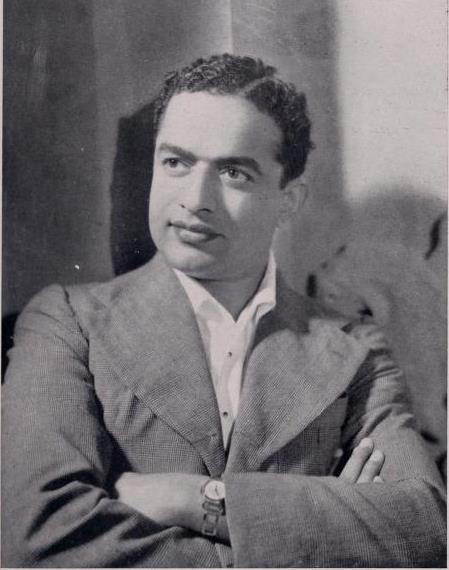
V. Shantaram (Marathi)

India has many regional film centres, such as Bollywood (Hindi) in Mumbai, Telugu cinema (Tollywood) in Hyderabad, Marathi cinema in Pune, Tamil cinema in Chennai, Malayalam cinema in Kerala, Kannada cinema in Bangalore, Odia Cinema in Bhubaneswar and Cuttack, Assamese cinema in Guwahati, Punjabi cinema in Mohali, Gujarati cinema (Dhollywood) in Gujarat and Bengali cinema (Tollywood) in Kolkata. Most film directors are known for their work with one regional industry, while many others are active directors of films from multiple industries.

== Directors of parallel or independent cinema ==
Parallel Cinema is otherwise known as "Art films" cinema, and is known for its serious and realistic films with real-life situations. In the 1960s and 1970s, the Indian government financed a number of such films, on Indian themes. Many of the directors were graduates of the Film and Television Institute of India, Pune. Ritwik Ghatak was a professor at the institute and a well-known director in his own right. The best-known Indian "neo-realist" is Satyajit Ray.

- Ashvin Kumar
- AR Murugadoss
- Adoor Gopalakrishnan
- Ajita Suchitra Veera
- Amit Dutta
- Anurag Kashyap
- Aparna Sen
- G Aravindan
- Bala
- K. Balachander
- Biju Viswanath
- Bimal Roy
- Budhdhadeb Dasgupta
- T. V. Chandran
- Dadasaheb Phalke
- Dasari Narayana Rao
- Dedipya Joshii
- Dibakar Banerjee
- Ganesh Acharya
- Girish Kasaravalli
- Goutam Bora
- Govind Nihalani
- Harpreet Sandhu
- Jabbar Patel
- Jahnu Barua
- Joe Rajan
- John Abraham (director)
- Kalpana Lajmi
- Kundan Shah
- Mahesh Narayanan
- Mira Nair
- Mrinal Sen
- Onir
- Partho Sen-Gupta
- Piyush Jha
- Prakash Jha
- Piyush Sarkar Mungi
- Praveen Morchhale
- Prince Joy
- Sumitra Bhave–Sunil Sukthankar
- Puttanna Kanagal
- L. V. Prasad
- Puneet Sira
- T. K. Rajeev Kumar
- K. Raghavendra Rao
- Raju Kafley
- B. N. Reddy
- Rahul Dholakia
- Rituparno Ghosh
- Ritwik Ghatak
- S. Shankar
- Saeed Akhtar Mirza
- Sai Paranjpye
- Sathish Kalathil
- Satyajit Ray
- Satyaprakash Upadhyay
- Shaji N. Karun
- V. Shantaram
- Shyam Benegal
- Sonali Gulati
- Sridhar Rangayan
- Sudhir Mishra
- Suresh Joachim
- Tapan Sinha
- Tarun Majumdar
- Tigmanshu Dhulia
- Tinu Suresh Desai
- Upendra
- Vijayakrishnan
- Venishman venkatesan
- Vijay Singh
- K. Viswanath
- Sai Prakash

== Active in multiple languages ==
The following is a list of film directors who have directed films from more than one regional film industry in India. This does not include directors who work in a single industry whose films have been dubbed into other languages.

DIRECTOR	Assamese	Bengali	Bhojpuri	English	Gujarati	Hindi	Kannada	Malayalam	Marathi	Maithili	Odia	Punjabi	Tamil	Telugu
Ram Gopal Varma						Yes	Yes	Yes					Yes	Yes
K. Raghavendra Rao						Yes	Yes						Yes	Yes
Dasari Narayana Rao						Yes							Yes	Yes
S. S. Rajamouli													Yes	Yes
Mrinal Sen		Yes				Yes					Yes			Yes
Puri Jagannadh						Yes	Yes					Yes	Yes	Yes
S. Shankar						Yes							Yes	Yes
Bharathan								Yes						
Basu Bhattacharya						Yes							Yes	
Gautham Vasudev Menon						Yes						Yes	Yes	
Girish Karnad						Yes	Yes							
Girish Kasaravalli						Yes	Yes							
Mani Ratnam						Yes	Yes						Yes	Yes
Rituparno Ghosh		Yes		Yes		Yes								
Sumitra Bhave–Sunil Sukthankar						Yes			Yes					
AR Murugadoss						Yes							Yes	Yes
Puttanna Kanagal						Yes	Yes							
Satish Rajwade						Yes			Yes					
Sachin Kundalkar						Yes			Yes					
Shonali Bose				Yes		Yes								
Prasanta Nanda					Yes				Yes	Yes				
Hara Patnaik					Yes				Yes	Yes				
Siddique					Yes		Yes				Yes			
Sunil Kumar Desai						Yes	Yes							
Mahesh Manjrekar						Yes			Yes					
Upendra						Yes	Yes						Yes	Yes
Nagraj Manjule						Yes			Yes					
Om Raut						Yes			Yes					
Anup Bhandari						Yes	Yes	Yes					Yes	Yes
Laxman Utekar						Yes			Yes					
Srijit Mukherji		Yes				Yes								
Shaji N Karun						Yes		Yes						

== Sanskrit film directors ==
- G. V. Iyyer
- Suresh Gayathri
- Janardhana Maharshi

== Bengali film directors ==
- Hiralal Sen
- Dhirendranath Gangopadhyay (D. G.)
- Sisir Bhaduri
- J. J. Madan
- Madhu Bose
- Niranjan Pal
- Premankur Atorthy
- Prafulla Ghosh
- Bimal Roy
- Pramathesh Barua
- Satyajit Ray
- Ritwik Ghatak
- Satyen Bose
- Mrinal Sen
- Hiren Nag
- Nitin Bose
- Tulsi Lahiri
- Hemen Gupta
- Agradoot
- Naresh Mitra
- Yatrik
- Chitta Bose
- Niren Lahiri
- Ajoy Kar
- Satyen Bose
- Subodh Mitra
- Amar Choudhury
- Haridas Bhattacharya
- Tapan Sinha
- Prafulla Chakraborty
- Asit Sen
- Manju Dey
- Salil Dutta
- Alamgir Kabir
- Buddhadev Dasgupta
- Tarun Majumdar
- Utpal Dutta
- Dilip Ray
- Goutam Ghose
- Basu Chatterjee
- Rituparno Ghosh
- Aparna Sen
- Chidananda Dasgupta
- Prabhat Roy
- Anjan Choudhury
- Shakti Samanta
- Saroj Dey
- Ashoke Viswanathan
- Raja Sen
- Sandip Ray
- Sukhen Das
- Bratya Basu
- Kaushik Ganguly
- Bappaditya Bandopadhyay
- Arjun Chakraborty
- Suman Mukhopadhyay
- Kushal Chakraborty
- Srijit Mukherji
- Basu Bhattacharya
- Sekhar Das
- Atanu Ghosh
- Anjan Dutt
- Goutam Halder
- Aniruddha Roy Chowdhury
- Abhijit Guha
- Sudeshna Roy
- Kamaleshwar Mukherjee
- Gaurav Pandey
- Aditya Vikram Sengupta
- Haranath Chakraborty
- Indrani Pal-Chaudhuri
- Sujit Mondal
- Raj Chakraborty
- Swapan Saha
- Nandita Roy
- Shiboprosad Mukherjee
- Sujit Guha
- Qaushiq Mukherjee
- Aniket Chattopadhaya
- Tathagata Mukherjee
- Ravi Kinagi
- Mainak Bhaumik
- Mujibar Rahaman

== Punjabi film directors ==
- Smeep Kang
- Rana Ranbir
- Jagdeep Sidhu
- Amberdeep Singh
- Gippy Grewal
- Parmish Verma
- Anurag Singh
- Simerjit Singh
- Sarjit Bains
- Ksshitij Chaudhary
- Rohit Jugraj
- Vikram Dhillon
- Mukesh Gautam
- Sukh Sanghera

== Gujrati film directors ==
- Abhishek Jain
- Chandulal Shah
- Dhwani Gautam
- Govindbhai Patel
- Mulraj Rajda
- Nanubhai Vakil
- Shantilal Soni
- Sooni Taraporevala
- Zanane Rajsingh
- Viral Shah
- Deepak Antani
- Krishnadev Yagnik
- Jashwant Gangani

== Kannada film directors ==
- Puttanna Kanagal
- V. Ravichandran
- Upendra
- Yograj Bhat
- Duniya Soori
- Anup Bhandari
- Pawan Kumar
- Rakshit Shetty
- Dinesh Baboo
- Nagathihalli Chandrasekhar
- B Ramamurthy
- Dorai–Bhagavan
- G. V. Iyer
- B. S. Ranga
- V. Somashekhar
- Kashinath
- Girish Kasaravalli
- Girish Karnad
- S. V. Rajendra Singh Babu
- D. Rajendra Babu
- Sunil Kumar Desai
- Om Prakash Rao
- Baraguru Ramachandrappa
- Shankar Nag
- Prem
- Preetham Gubbi
- R. Chandru
- A. M. R. Ramesh
- S. Narayan
- Dayal Padmanabhan
- Abhaya Simha
- P. Vasu
- Rishab Shetty
- Mohan Shankar
- Shashank
- Agni Shridhar
- Jayatheertha
- Vinay Bharadwaj
- Prashanth Neel
- T. S. Nagabharana
- H. R. Bhargava

== Malayalam film directors ==
- Ranjith
- John Abraham
- Aashiq Abu
- G. Aravindan
- Sathish Kalathil
- Sathyan Anthikkad
- Dinesh Baboo
- Priyadarshan
- P. A. Backer
- Bharathan
- T. V. Chandran
- Lal Jose
- T. K. Rajeev Kumar
- Fazil
- Adoor Gopalakrishnan
- K. G. George
- Hariharan
- Kamal
- Shaji Karun
- K. P. Kumaran
- Lal
- Lohithadas
- Joy Mathew
- Anjali Menon
- Balachandra Menon
- Gautham Vasudev Menon
- P.N. Menon
- Mohan
- K. R. Mohanan
- Mahesh Narayanan
- M. T. Vasudevan Nair
- Amal Neerad
- P. Padmarajan
- Rajesh Pillai
- Dileesh Pothan
- Priyadarsan
- Alphonse Putharen
- Lenin Rajendran
- Anwar Rasheed
- Rajeev Ravi
- I. V. Sasi
- K. S. Sethumadhavan
- Shyamaprasad
- Siddique
- Sreenivasan
- Sameer Thahir
- Vijayakrishnan
- A. Vincent
- Rajasenan
- Shaji Kailas
- K. Madhu
- Joshiy
- Vineeth Sreenivasan
- RK DreamWest

== Marathi film directors ==
- Satish Motling
- Baburao Painter
- Jabbar Patel
- V. Shantaram
- Dadasaheb Phalke
- Dada Kondke
- Amol Palekar
- Nishikant Kamat
- Mahesh Kothare
- Sachin Pilgaonkar
- Mahesh Manjrekar
- Gajendra Ahire
- Pralhad Keshav Atre
- Ravi Jadhav
- P. L. Deshpande
- Chandrakant Kulkarni
- Sachin Kundalkar
- Paresh Mokashi
- Bhalji Pendharkar
- Raja Paranjape
- Ram Gabale
- Ramesh Deo
- Satish Rajwade
- Sayaji Shinde
- Sanjay Surkar
- Suryakant Mandhare
- Smita Talwalkar
- Kedar Shinde
- Mrinal Kulkarni
- Dadasaheb Torne
- Vijay Gokhale
- Vishnupant Damle
- Sujay Dahake
- Umesh Vinayak Kulkarni
- Avdhoot Gupte
- Nitin Chandrakant Desai
- Ashutosh Gowarikar
- Amol Palekar
- Madhur Bhandarkar
- Amol Gupte
- Sandeep Sawant
- Anand Patwardhan
- Bhagwan Dada
- Master Vinayak
- Kunal Deshmukh
- Vishram Sawant
- Abhinay Deo
- Gauri Shinde
- Nagraj Manjule
- Dinkar D. Patil
- Prasad Oak

== Odia film directors ==
- Nirad N. Mohapatra
- Nitai Palit
- Prashant Nanda
- Apurba Kishore Bir
- Sabyasachi Mohapatra
- Mehmood Hussain
- Chittaranjan Tripathy
- Nila Madhab Panda
- Pranab Kumar Aich
- Susant Mani
- Tapas Sargharia
- Sarat Pujari
- Sisir Kumar Sahoo
- Anupam Pattnaik
- Debiprasad Lenka

== Tamil film directors ==
- Thangar Bachan
- C. V. Sridhar
- A. P. Nagarajan
- A. C. Tirulokchandar
- K. Balachander
- Balu Mahendra
- Mahendran
- Bharathiraja
- Bharathan
- A. Bhimsingh
- S. P. Muthuraman
- S. A. Chandrasekhar
- Bhagyaraj
- T. Rajendar
- P. Vasu
- Suresh Krissna
- K. S. Ravikumar
- Mani Ratnam
- S. Shankar
- Kartiki Gonsalves
- Vetrimaaran
- Atlee
- Lokesh Kanagaraj
- AR Murugadoss
- V. Z. Durai
- Seenu Ramasamy
- Selvaraghavan
- Thiagarajan Kumararaja
- Bala
- Karthik Subbaraj
- Nalan Kumarasamy
- Gautham Vasudev Menon
- M. Raja
- Vasanthabalan
- Ram
- S. J. Surya
- R. Ajay Gnanamuthu
- Karthick Naren
- Kamal Haasan
- Balaji Sakthivel
- K. V. Anand
- P. C. Sreeram
- Jeeva
- Rajiv Menon
- Santosh Sivan
- Vijay Milton
- Dharani
- Hari
- Ameer Sultan
- Agathian
- S. P. Jananathan
- Mysskin
- Prabu Solomon
- Pandiraj
- Siruthai Siva
- Pa. Ranjith
- Samuthirakani
- Sasikumar
- Sasi
- R. K. Selvamani
- Ezhil
- Saran
- Prabhu Deva
- Dhanush
- Silambarasan
- Suseenthiran
- Venkat Prabhu
- Vishnuvardhan
- Vikraman

Mari Selvaraj

== Telugu film directors ==
- Surender Reddy
- Krishna Vamsi
- Ram Gopal Varma
- Teja
- Adurthi Subba Rao
- Priyadarshan
- R. Narayana Murthy
- Nandamuri Taraka Ramarao
- Bapu
- K. Vijaya Bhaskar
- Bhaskar
- YVS Chowdary
- Prabhu Deva
- Gunasekhar
- Jandhyala
- Puri Jagannadh
- Muppalaneni Shiva
- A. Karunakaran
- Sekhar Kammula
- S. V. Krishna Reddy
- Raghava Lawrence
- Neelakanta
- L. V. Prasad
- C. Pullaiah
- Vedantam Raghavayya
- S. S. Rajamouli
- B. S. Ranga
- Dasari Narayana Rao
- Krishna Chaitanya (lyricist)
- K. Raghavendra Rao
- Katta Subba Rao
- S.Shivgopal Krishna
- A. Kodandarami Reddy
- Trivikram Srinivas
- Sukumar
- G. C. Sekhar
- Dr. K. Vishwanath
- Chandra Sekhar Yeleti
- Harish Shankar
- Koratala Siva
- Boyapati Srinu
- Anil Ravipudi
- Srikanth Addala
- B. V. Nandini Reddy
- Ajay Bhupathi
- Prasanth Varma
- Radha Krishna Kumar

== Jammu and Kashmir film directors ==
- Mir Sarwar
