= Vikram Dhillon =

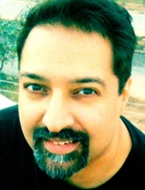
- Born: Vikram Dyal Dhillon
- Occupations: Director, producer, actor, television presenter, co-founder of The Foundry
- Years active: 1991–present
- Parent(s): Dyal Singh Dhillon; Harcharan Kaur Dhillon
- Relatives: Virikshat Dhillon (brother); Vekeana Dhillon (sister); Puneet Sira (brother-in-law)

Vikram Dhillon is an Indo-Canadian feature film producer, director, actor and former VJ for Channel V (Star TV India).

== Biography ==
=== Career ===
Vikram Dhillon is a co-founder of the newly formed digital content studio The Foundry with his partner Puneet Sira. He is producing a slate of original IP projects with studios, OTT platforms and channels.

Dhillon directed a Punjabi feature film titled Pinky Moge Wali starring Neeru Bajwa, Geeta Zaildar and Gavie Chahal, for which Dhillon was nominated for Best Director.

He also produced the web series The Great Punjabi Luv Shuv Story for Ekta Kapoor's digital channel AltBalaji under his Eyeline Entertainment banner, including the feature film Ji Karda, directed and produced by Dhillon.

Dhillon began his career as a VJ for Rupert Murdoch’s Channel V (Star TV) where he hosted the shows [V] Challenge, Cool Maal and Late Night V. Dhillon went on to produce and direct series for the channel such as The Chair, Chat Room and Cool Maal.

The feature film documentary Bollywood Bound (2003) (Canadian National Film Board) followed the lives of Vikram Dhillon, Vekeana Dhillon, Neeru Bajwa and Ruby Bhatia as Indo-Canadians in Bollywood. The film premiered at the Palm Springs International Film Festival in 2003.

Dhillon continued his work as a producer with Jataka Tales for Japanese television; Sanatta, a horror series; and I Like an interview-based series for B4U Music. He produced a talk show called Take One for Geo TV in Dubai.

Dhillon has directed a series of commercials for Society Magazine, which he also produced. Dhillon produced and directed music videos for bands such as Mantra and Signia. Independently, he has produced and directed corporate videos and AVs for Idea Cellular, Magna Publishing Co. and the Consulate General of Canada (Mumbai).

Dhillon produced and directed a short documentary film, Mogaveera, for the Vyavasthaphaka Mandali (Mumbai).

== Personal life ==
Dhillon's sister Vekeana Dhillon is a content creator, screenwriter and actress. She wrote Vikram's Pinky Moge Wali and Ji Karda; and Puneet Sira's I - Proud To Be An Indian, Jai Veeru, and Kisaan.

Dhillon is the son of the retired environmental health officer Dyal Singh Dhillon and Harcharan Kaur Dhillon, who wrote the lyrics to the song "Khyalan Wich", which was featured in I - Proud To Be An Indian (2004).

== Filmography ==
Title	Year	Designation	Genre	Company	Notes
Pride and Prejudice	2023	Producer	Audio series	The Foundry / Audible	The Foundry's original adaption into Hindi. Winner of "Best Audiobook Narration" Golden Mikes Radio & Audio Awards (2023).
Sherlock Holmes Ki Romanchak Kahaniyan	2022	Producer	Audio series	The Foundry / Audible	The Foundry's original adaption into Hindi. Winner of "Best Audiobook Narration" Golden Mikes Radio & Audio Awards (2023). Winner of "The Best Story Narration based on a Book" e4m Play Streaming Media Awards (2023).
Kama Sutra	2022	Producer	Audiobook	The Foundry / Audible	The Foundry's original adaption into Hindi. Winner of "Audio Book of the Year" India Audio Summit & Awards (2022).
Munshi Premchand's Karmabhoomi	2022	Producer	Audiobook	The Foundry / Audible	
Raat Hone Ko Hai	2022	Producer	Animation series	The Foundry / Ishara TV	Limited series
"Photo Jatt Di"	December 2018	Director / producer	Music video	T-Series / The Music Foundry	Singer: Monty Waris
"November 2"	November 2018	Director / producer	Music video	T-Series / The Music Foundry	Singer: Akaal
"Marr Ke Khuda"	October 2018	Director / producer	Music video	T-Series / The Music Foundry	Singer: Simar Gill (featuring Simran Dhindsa)
The Great Punjabi Luv Shuv Story	Under production	Producer	Web series	ALTBalaji / Eyeline Entertainment	Director: Puneet Sira
Ji Karda	Under production	Director / producer	Feature film	Eyeline Entertainment	
Pinky Moge Wali	2012	Director / story	Feature film	Kapil Batra Productions	Nominated for Best Director PTC Punjabi Film Awards
Chai Time	2007–2008	Guest host (Bollywood expert)	Television series	Omni Television (Canada)	Host: Tarannum Thind
Valentines Bash	2007	Producer	Event	Eyeline Entertainment	
"Karlo Aishaan" - Signia	2006	Director / producer	Music video	Eyeline Entertainment	
Crossover Bollywood	2006	Director / producer	Fashion event	Eyeline Entertainment	Winter Wonderland Fashion Extravaganza for Actor Sunil Shetty.
I Like	2005	Producer	Television series	B4U Music	
Mogaveera	2005	Director / producer	Documentary	Visual-Eyes Entertainment	
Take One	2005	Producer	Television series	Visual-Eyes Entertainment	Network: Geo TV (Dubai)
"Jawani" - Mantra	2005	Director / producer	Music video	Aura Entertainment	
"Boliyan" - Signia	2005	Director / producer	Music video	Aura Entertainment	
"Rog Judaiyan" - Sukjeet Khera	2005	Producer	Music video	Aura Entertainment	Director: Tinu Suresh Desai & Vishal Sethi
Idea Cellular	2005	Director / producer	Audio visual	Visual-Eyes Entertainment	
Bollywood Bound	2003	Self (lead)	Feature film documentary	National Film Board of Canada	Director: Nisha Pahuja
Jataka Tales	2003	Producer	Television	Miracle Films / Kavya Production	Director: Puneet Sira
Sanatta	2002	Producer	Television	Miracle Films	Director: Puneet Sira
Society Achiever's Awards	2002	Director / producer	Television	Miracle Films	
Society Magazine (series)	2002	Director / producer	Commercial	Miracle Films	
[V] Chat Room	2000	Director / producer	Television series	Channel [V] (Star India)	
The Chair	2000	Director / producer	Television series	Channel [V] (Star India)	
Late Night [V]	2000	Host (VJ)	Television daily show	Channel [V] (Star India)	
[V] Cool Maal	1999	Director / producer / h (VJ)	Television series	Channel [V] (Star India)	
[V] Challenge	1999	Host (VJ)	Television series	Channel [V] (Star India)	
Ponds Cream	1998	Lead actor	Commercial	BharatBala Productions	Director: Bharat Bala
Nescafe Coffee	1998	Lead actor	Commercial	BharatBala Productions	Director: Bharat Bala
Holy River	1998	Lead actor	Theatre play	Work In Progress Theatre Co.	Director: Etienne Coutinho
Jenson & Nicholson Paints	1997	Lead actor	Commercial	BharatBala Productions	Director: Bharat Bala
West Side Story	1991	"Doc" actor	Theatre	Queen Elizabeth Players	
The Prettiest Girl in Lafayette County	1991	Director	Theatre	Queen Elizabeth Players	Writer: Samuel French. Award: Best Director. Award: Best Actor. Award: Best Actress.
