= Comex =

Comex may refer to:

- COMEX (NYMEX), a division of the New York Mercantile Exchange (NYMEX)
- COMEX (Compagnie maritime d'expertises), a French company in undersea engineering
- Comex Group, a Mexican paint manufacturer and distributor
- Commonwealth Expedition, a series of expeditions from Britain to India
- Los Comex, a comic book imprint
