= Beyond Blue (disambiguation) =

Beyond Blue is an Australian mental health and wellbeing support organisation.

Beyond Blue may also refer to:

- Beyond Blue (video game), a 2020 diving exploration game
- Beyond Blue, a film directed by Zanane Rajsingh
