= Puneet Sira =

British and Bollywood film director and producer

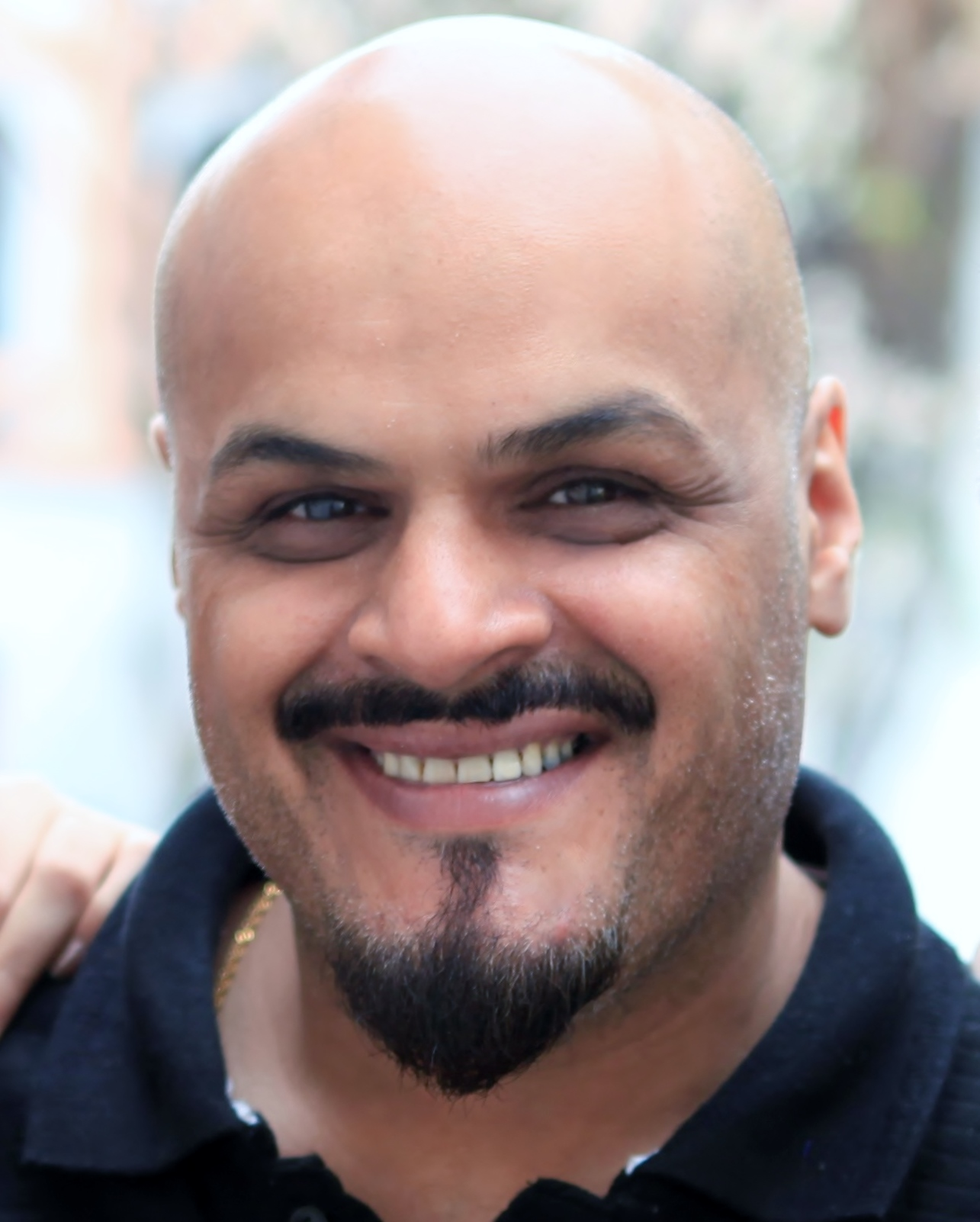
- Occupations: Film Director, Producer
- Spouse: Vekeana Dhillon (m. 2010)
- Children: Shaan Sira, Simran Sira
- Relatives: Vikram Dhillon (brother-in-law)
- Awards: 2009 SAFF Director Award: Kisaan

Puneet Sira is a British and Bollywood feature film director and producer who formed The Foundry which is actively developing original IPs in house and producing feature films, television series, animation projects and its multi award-winning podcasts.

His tenure at BBC Films gave him the foundation to build a career as director, writer and producer. Since then, he's been the executive producer of Channel [V] for the Star TV Network. He's produced and directed several dramas for television and feature films including I - Proud To Be An Indian (2004), Jai Veeru (2009) and Kisaan', (2009) for which he received a Best Director honor. Virat Kohli's Super V (2019), a Superhero animation series, directed by Puneet for Disney+, Marvel HQ, Star TV Network, Hotstar and Baweja Movies is the highest rated show in the animation bracket in India with almost 200 million views.

== Biography ==
=== Early career ===
Sira started his career as an actor in the UK at the age of nine as a beggar boy in Annie Besant, The Warrior's Return(1977) as part of The Velvet Glove series for the BBC, directed by Philip Saville. Puneet went on to play in the feature film Arabian Adventure(1979). He played the lead role of Majeed, directed by Kevin Connor. In the same year Puneet played Kasava Minor in the BBC series To Serve Them All My Days (1979).

In 1980 Sira was the youngest member to participate in Comex 10, a commonwealth expedition sponsored by Prince Philip, Duke of Edinburgh. Founded by Lieutenant Colonel Lionel Gregory, OBE, Comex 10 was an expedition where 40 artistes from all commonwealth countries toured India performing variety acts in every city visited.

More acting work followed from How We Used to Live (Yorkshire Television), Why Couples Break Up (Yorkshire Television), London's Burning (London Weekend Television), The Moneymen (London Weekend Television), The Park (Regent Productions), The Betrothed (LIFS) and the highly acclaimed Walkers Poppadoms Commercial, The Rocking Sikh directed by Paul Weiland.

=== Film-making career ===
Sira became an assistant director at BBC Films Department on films such as Hallelujah Anyhow(1991) (Screen Two) starring Keith David, Sweet Nothing(1990) (Screen One) and Can You Hear Me Thinking?(1991) starring Judi Dench. He freelanced on Flying Colors (1993), Memsahib Rita (1994), Blue Baby (1994) before venturing into directing his own films like Strings (1996) which he also wrote and produced.

Sira was the director of the London Academy of Acting (a school founded by his father, Gurdial Sira in 1970), where he would teach acting for film. He set up an actors' agency, Talent Introduction Centre (T.I.C.), where he provided work for Asian actors in the UK.

Casting director was another title to Sira's credit: films such as Jinnah (1998) starring Christoper Lee, Flight(1992) (BBC Screen One), directed by Alex Pillai, Immaculate Conception (1992) directed by Jamil Dehlavi, Memsahib Rita (1994) and Frantz Fanon – Black Skin, White Mask (1996) directed by Isaac Julien. On the American feature film Passion in the Desert (1997) Sira worked on production.

Sira lectured on basic film making at Middlesex University and Italia Conti Acting Academy as a visiting lecturer.

In 1998, Sira became the executive producer for Rupert Murdoch's Channel V, (STAR TV), producing more than 22 television shows for the channel in Mumbai. He went on to produce and direct drama for television The Steal (2000) STAR TV, followed by Sanatta (2001) and Jataka Tales (2002) for Japanese television which Sira directed and produced with his partner Vikram Dhillon. Sira went on to direct the feature films I - Proud To Be An Indian (2004), Jai Veeru (2009) and Kisaan (2009).

As a screenwriter Sira wrote I - Proud To Be An Indian with Vekeana Dhillon. Together they have written the screenplay for the feature film Kurbani for Feroz Khan (FK International) and Spiceboy for Miracle Films. Sira had written The Steal and Sanatta.

Sira and Vikram Dhillon are partners in The Foundry, a production company which has developed several feature films as well as several IP for the major OTT platforms, and award-winning scripted podcasts for Audible such as the adaptations of Pride & Prejudice, Sherlock Holmes and Kama Sutra which ranked No. 1 in Audible's Wellness & Self Help Podcasts of 2023 and ranked No. 2 of the Audible's most listened to Originals and Exclusives of 2023. It also won Audiobook of the year at India Audio Summit & Awards (2022)

== Filmography ==
Title	Year	Designation	Genre	Company	Note
Woman in Bed #3	2024	Producer / Director	Podcast Series	The Foundry / Audible	The Foundry's original fully immersive audio drama of 15 episodes
Pride and Prejudice	2023	Producer	Podcast Series	The Foundry / Audible	The Foundry's original adaption into Hindi Winner of "Best Audiobook Narration" Golden Mikes Radio & Audio Awards (2023).
Sherlock Holmes Ki Romanchak Kahaniyan	2022	Producer	Podcast Series	The Foundry / Audible	The Foundry's original adaption into Hindi. Winner of "Best Audiobook Narration" Golden Mikes Radio & Audio Awards (2023). Winner of "The Best Story Narration based on a Book" e4m Play Streaming Media Awards (2023)
Kama Sutra	2022	Producer	Audiobook	The Foundry / Audible	The Foundry's original adaption into Hindi. Winner of "Audiobook of the Year" India Audio Summit & Awards (2022)
Karmabhoomi	2022	Producer	Audiobook	The Foundry / Audible	
Raat Hone Ko Hai	2022	Producer / Series Director	Animation Series	The Foundry / Ishara TV	Limited Series
Super V	2019-2020	Series Director	Superhero Animation Series	Disney+, Marvel HQ, Star TV Network, Hotstar, Baweja Movies	
The Great Punjabi Luv Shuv Story	Under Production	Director / Producer	Web Series	Altbalaji / Eyeline Entertainment	
Ji Karda	Under Production	Producer / Story	Feature Film	Eyeline Entertainment	Dir: Vikram Dhillon
Photo Jatt Di	2018	Producer	Music Video	The Foundry	Dir: Vikram Dhillon
November 2	2018	Producer	Music Video	The Foundry	Dir: Vikram Dhillon
Marr Ke Khuda	2018	Producer	Music Video	The Foundry	Dir: Vikram Dhillon
Pinky Moge Wali	2012	Special Thanks	Feature Film	Kapil Batra Productions	Dir: Vikram Dhillon
Kisaan	2009	Director	Feature Film	Sohail Khan Productions	SAFF L.A. Award: Director
Jai Veeru	2009	Director	Feature Film	Venus / Siddhi Vinayak Movies	
Kurbani	2008	Writer	Feature Film	F.K. International	Dir: Feroz Khan
Flipped Campaign: MTV Arabia	2006	Director	9 Commercials	MTV Arabia / Raj Taru (Dubai)	Series of 9 commercials for the "Flipped" campaign.
Jawani	2004	Producer	Music Video	Aura Entertainment	Dir: Vikram Dhillon
Rog Judaayian	2004	Producer	Music Video	Aura Entertainment	Dir: Dharmendra Suresh Desai & Vishal Sethi
I-Proud To Be An Indian	2004	Director / Writer	Feature Film	Sohail Khan Productions	
Jataka Tales	2003	Director / Producer	Television	Kavya Films / Miracle Films	
Spiceboy	2003	Writer	Feature Film	Miracle Films	
Sanatta	2002	Director / Producer / Writer	Television	Miracle Films	
Society Achiever's Awards	2002	Producer	Television	Visual-Eyes Entertainment	
Society Magazine: A Class Act	2001	Director / Producer / Writer	3 Commercials	Visual-Eyes Entertainment / Magna Publishing	Series of commercials for the "A Class Act" campaign.
The Steal	2000	Director / Producer / Writer	Television	Star TV India	
[V] Dares You	1999	Executive producer	Television	Channel V (Star TV)	
Challenge	1999	Executive producer	Television	Channel V (Star TV)	
The Juice	1999	Executive producer	Television	Channel V (Star TV)	
Cool Maal	1999	Executive producer	Television	Channel V (Star TV)	
Sophiya's Choice	1999	Executive producer	Television	Channel V (Star TV)	
Patli Galli	1999	Executive producer	Television	Channel V (Star TV)	
Style Police	1999	Executive producer	Television	Channel V (Star TV)	
Late Night [V]	1999	Executive producer	Television	Channel V (Star TV)	
[V] People	1999	Executive producer	Television	Channel V (Star TV)	
The Chair	1999	Executive producer	Television	Channel V (Star TV)	
[V] On Campus	1999	Executive producer	Television	Channel V (Star TV)	
[V] Saba	1999	Executive producer	Television	Channel V (Star TV)	
Tea with [V}	1999	Executive producer	Television	Channel V (Star TV)	
Li[V]e Video Requests	1999	Executive producer	Television	Channel V (Star TV)	
Flashback	1998	Executive producer	Television	Channel V (Star TV)	
First Day First Show	1998	Executive producer	Television	Channel V (Star TV)	
Maang Ta Hai	1998	Executive producer	Television	Channel V (Star TV)	
By Demand	1998	Executive producer	Television	Channel V (Star TV)	
Flashback	1998	Executive producer	Television	Channel V (Star TV)	
OYE	1998	Executive producer	Television	Channel V (Star TV)	
House Arrest	1998	Executive producer	Television	Channel V (Star TV)	
Rewind	1998	Executive producer	Television	Channel V (Star TV)	
Speak Easy	1998	Executive producer	Television	Channel V (Star TV)	
The Ticket	1998	Executive producer	Television	Channel V (Star TV)	
Soul Curry	1998	Executive producer	Television	Channel V (Star TV)	
House of Noise	1998	Executive producer	Television	Channel V (Star TV)	
Jinnah	1998	Casting Director	Feature Film	Petra Films (UK)	Dir: Jamil Dehlavi
Strings	1997	Director / Producer / Writer	Film	Global Pictures (UK)	
Passion In The Desert	1997	Production Secretary	Feature Film	Roland Films (UK)	Dir: Lavinia Currier
World Beach Volleyball Championship	1996	Director	Sports Television	ESPN / Procam Sports	
Last Cloud on Margalla Hills	1996	Director	Theatre	Oval House Theatre (UK)	
Franz Fannon – Black Skin White Mask	1996	Casting Director	Television	BBC / Normal Films	Dir: Issac Julien
Flight	1996	Casting Director	Feature Film	BBC Films / Hindi Pictures	Dir: Alex Pillai
Memsahib Rita	1994	Assistant director	Film	BBC Films / Leda Serene Films	Dir: Pratibha Parmar
Flying Colours	1993	Casting Director / Assistant Director	Film	N.F.T.S.	Dir: Alex Pillai
Blue Baby	1993	Assistant director	Film	N.F.T.S.	
Immaculate Conception	1992	Casting Director	Feature Film	Dehlavi Films (UK)	Dir: Jamil Dehlavi
Day Twelve	1991	Director / Writer / Producer	Short Film	CBFW	Clapham & Battersea Film Festival
Hallelujah Anyhow	1991	Assistant director	Feature Film	BBC Films	Dir: Matthew Jacobs
Can You Hear Me Thinking?	1990	Assistant director	Feature Film	BBC Films	Dir: Christopher Morahan
Sweet Nothing	1990	Assistant director	Feature Film	BBC Films	Dir: Tony Smith
Dec 14	1990	Director / Writer / Producer	Short Film	CBFW	Clapham & Battersea Film Festival
The Betrothed	1990	"Arjun" Actor	Film	L.I.F.S.	
The Paradise Club	1989	"Elvis" Actor	Television	Zenith Entertainment	Dir: Murray Smith
Why Couples Break Up	1989	"Lover" Actor	Television	Yorkshire Television	
Entertainment Tonight	1988	Self	Television	US Television	
Night Network	1988	Self	Television	London Weekend Television	
The Rocking Sikh	1988	"Rocking Sikh" Actor	Commercial	The Weiland Company	Dir: Paul Weiland
London's Burning	1988	"Indian Waiter" Actor	Television	London Weekend Television	Dir: John Reardon
The Money Men	1987	"Dealer" Actor	TV movie	London Weekend Television	Dir: John Bruce
How We Used To Live	1987	"Sanjay" Actor	Television	Yorkshire Television	
Comex 10	1980	Variety Act	Theatre	Commonwealth Expedition	Dir: Colonel Lionel Gregory Sponsored by: The Duke of Edinburgh - Prince Philip
To Serve Them All My Days	1980	"Kasava Minor" Actor	Television	BBC Series	Dir: Ronald Wilson
Arabian Adventure	1979	"Majeed" Actor	Feature Film	EMI / Badger Films	Dir: Kevin Connor
The Four Feathers	1978	"Arab Boy" Voice (uncredited)	Feature Film	Trident Films	Dir: Don Sharp
The Velvet Glove – Warriors Return	1977	"Indian Boy" Actor	Television	BBC Series	Dir: Philip Saville

== Awards ==
- 2023: Golden Mikes Radio and Audio Awards - Producer (Sherlock Holmes Ki Romanchak Kahaniyan)
- 2023: Golden Mikes Radio and Audio Awards - Producer (Pride & Prejudice)
- 2023: e4m Play Streaming Media Awards - Producer (Sherlock Holmes Ki Romanchak Kahaniyan)
- 2022: India Audio Summit & Awards - Producer (Kama Sutra)
- 2010: SAFF L.A. Award - Director (Kisaan)
