= Fun – Can Be Dangerous Sometimes =

Fun-Can Be Dangerous Sometimes
- Directed by: Sunjay Zaveri
- Screenplay by: Mir Muneer
- Story by: Amit Khan
- Produced by: Avinash Kashid; Sudhir Kumar; Surendra Bhatia
- Starring: Siddharth Koirala; Aryan Vaid; Payal Rohatgi; Hina Tasleem
- Cinematography: Mahendra Rayan
- Music by: Sanjeev Darshan
- Production company: Oracle Entertainment Pvt Ltd
- Release date: 25 February 2005
- Country: India
- Language: Hindi

Fun-Can Be Dangerous Sometimes is a 2005 Hindi Thriller film directed by Sunjay Zaveri and produced by Goldie Tucker. The film features Aryan Vaid, Siddharth Koirala, Payal Rohatgi and Hina Tasleem as main characters. The plot of the film revolves around husband swapping.

== Story ==
A story about a group of couples on a vacation suddenly decided on a game of husband swapping. The story follows how this "fun" became dangerous later.

== Cast ==
- Siddharth Koirala as Aryan
- Aryan Vaid as Raj
- Hina Tasleem as Megha
- Payal Rohatgi as Natasha
- Rajat Bedi as Insp Rajesh
- Mahesh Manjrekar as Don
- Mushtaq Khan as Advocate Parvez
- Hemant Pandey as Chaturvedi
- Mallika Nayyar as Asha
- Gaurav Dixit as Anil
- Basheer Ahemad as Hussain

== Music ==
The music of the film is composed by Sanjeev Darshan and lyricists are Nasir Faraaz, Rakhi Pundit and Sunil Jogi.

| # | Title | Singer(s) |
|---|---|---|
| 1 | "Aish Karen" | Pinki, Preeti, Kunal Ganjawala |
| 2 | "Deewangi" | Alka Yagnik, Udit Narayan |
| 3 | "Fun" | Sunidhi Chauhan |
| 4 | "Jal Raha Hai Badan" | Shreya Ghoshal, Kunal Ganjawala |
| 5 | "Tum Paas Ho - Female" | Shreya Ghoshal |
| 6 | "Tum Paas Ho - Male" | Sonu Nigam |
| 7 | "Teriyaan Mohabbataan" | Anand Raj Anand |

== Reception ==
Patcy N of Rediff.com wrote, "The movie starts with a song, and the first half is just about skin show. There is not even one gripping scene before the interval. In the second half, there is a murder and it is solved. In effect, just the last half an hour of the movie is the 'story.' The rest is a haphazard collage of scenes."
