= John Gerson =

British political consultant

John Gerson was deputy head of MI6. He studied Art History at the University of Freiburg and then went to King's College, Cambridge. He went to India on the Commonwealth Expedition (COMEX) in 1965.

He was HM Consul in Beijing from 1974 to 1977 and interpreted for and advised Margaret Thatcher on China. Later he worked as a consultant in Brazil, Tanzania, and North Korea and was an Associate Member of University College London's Centre for the Study of Socialist Legal Systems. In 1992, he was visiting fellow in East Asian studies at Princeton University.

In 2001, he left MI6 and joined BP as a senior political adviser; he became their Head of Government and Public Affairs from 2007 to 2012. He joined the company in 2000. Gerson also chaired BP China Ltd and BP South East Asia Ltd.

On 24 April 2012, he has been appointed in the Board of Directors of the Handeni Gold Inc., a mineral exploration company which is mainly active in Tanzania.

He became CMG im 1999. He is a bird-watcher.
