= Hina Tasleem =

Indian actress

- Other name: Heena Rehmaan
- Occupation: Actress

Hina Tasleem (also credited as Heena Rehmaan) is an Indian actress who acted in several Hindi films.

== Biography ==
Tasleem made her debut in Bollywood with I Proud to Be an Indian which was released in 2004. In 2005 her film Fun – Can Be Dangerous Sometimes was released. Her film Ladies Tailor was released in 2006. She also worked in Ghutan which was released in 2007.

Tasleem's film Meri Padosan was released in 2009. Her film Meri Life Mein Uski Wife was released in 2009 too. In 2010 her film Ajab Devra Ka Gazab Bhauji was released which was a Bhojpuri film. Her film Sheetalbhabi.com was released in 2011.

== Filmography ==
Year	Film	Role	Notes
2004	I Proud to Be an Indian	Noor Firoz	Debut film
2005	Fun – Can Be Dangerous Sometimes	Megha	
2006	Ladies Tailor	Jassi	
2007	Ghutan	Catherine	
2009	First Time - Pehli Baar		
2009	Meri Padosan		
2009	Meri Life Mein Uski Wife	Sheetal	
2010	Ajab Devra Ka Gazab Bhauji		Bhojpuri film
2011	Sheetalbhabi.com	Sheetal	
2025	Run Bhola Run	Item girl	
