= Bank (film) =

- Directed by: Arun Kumar
- Written by: Shivgopal Krishna
- Produced by: Arun Kumar
- Starring: Jackie Shroff; Raghuvaran; Rahul Dev; Abbas; Veda
- Cinematography: K. Jagadish
- Edited by: Ramgopal Reddy
- Music by: Chinni Charan
- Production company: Arun Entertainments
- Release date: 30 January 2009
- Country: India
- Language: Telugu

Bank is a 2009 Indian Telugu-language heist film directed by Arun Kumar. The film stars Jackie Shroff, Raghuvaran, Rahul Dev, Abbas and Veda. It was released on 30 January 2009, dubbed in Hindi as Bank and as Vangi in Tamil.

== Cast ==
- Jackie Shroff
- Raghuvaran
- Rahul Dev
- Abbas
- Veda
- Pooja Bharathi
- Sreedhar Rao
- Baby Bhavana

== Production ==
Arun Kumar revealed that he initially wanted to produce the film but felt that only he could envision the tale correctly, and subsequently chose to direct the venture himself. While producing the film through the newly launched Arun Entertainments, he also set up his own music company, Arun Music. He introduced newcomer, Chinni Charan, to be the composer and lyricist. The director recruited an ensemble cast of Jackie Shroff, Raghuvaran, Rahul Dev, Abbas and Veda to star. Shroff noted that Arun Kumar could not speak English when he met him for the script narration, but was convinced to sign the film owing to the director's enthusiasm.

Production began during January 2007 and the film was mostly shot in Hyderabad and Mehaboob Studios in Mumbai. An audio soundtrack release event was held in Hyderabad during November 2007. The event was presided over by the Telugu Film Producers' Council President Tammareddy Bharadwaja.

== Soundtrack ==
No.	Title	Lyrics	Singer(s)	Length
1.	"Naa Choopu"	Chinni Charan	Shaan
2.	"Apparao"		Suneetha Rao, Geetha Madhuri
3.	"Chandamama"	Chinni Charan	Deepu
4.	"Hey Come On"		Rita
5.	"Prathi Kshanam"		Shreya Ghoshal
6.	"Bank Bank"		Shankar Mahadevan, Ranjith

== Release and reception ==
The film had a theatrical release on 30 January 2009. A critic from The Times of India gave the film one star out of five, and noted, "it remains a big question, how talented actors like Jackie Shroff and Raghuvaran could agree to do this lackluster film". The reviewer added, "on the face of it, a plot on bank robbery promises to be a nail-biting thriller, but the shoddy screenplay makes it a bad show".

The Tamil-dubbed version of the film was released straight to DVD in 2012.
