= Super V =

2019 Indian animated web series

- Genre: Action; Comedy; Superhero
- Created by: Harman Baweja
- Written by: Harman Baweja; Vekeana Dhillon; Dialogues; Amit Babbar; Mayur Puri
- Directed by: Puneet Sira; Gautmik; Ravinder Singh Bakshi
- Creative director: Puneet Sira
- Starring: Vaibhav Thakkar
- Country of origin: India
- Original language: Hindi
- No. of seasons: 1
- No. of episodes: 12

Production
- Executive producers: Shruti Sinha; Swati Patnaik
- Producers: Harman Baweja; Harry Baweja; Bunty Sajdeh; Jogesh Lulla
- Animator: IRealities Technology
- Production companies: Star India; Cornerstone Animation; Baweja Movies

Original release
- Network: Disney Channel; Marvel HQ; Star Sports; StarPlus; Disney+ Hotstar
- Release: 5 November 2019 – 26 January 2020

Super V is an Indian animated television series loosely based on Virat Kohli and was created by Harman Baweja for Star India. It was launched on multiple Star Network and Disney India's channels from 5 November 2019.

== Plot ==
Impulsive 14-year-old teenager Virat, on the cusp of childhood and adulthood, is trying to find his identity between his aspirations, his father's expectations, and other pressures.

Virat lives with his parents and sister in New Delhi. His lawyer father, Ashok, is known for strict honesty, and his mother, Gogi is a homemaker, a supermom who always manages to ground the situation no matter how volatile the relationship between Virat and Ashok gets. Ashok wants Virat to be responsible, mature, and disciplined; Virat wants to be left alone to be himself, a teenager for a few more years.

Virat wants to become the best batsman in the world. His coach, his teacher, and even his father know that Virat is a cricket prodigy, and is held back by his anger. Another problem is Virat's nemesis, the school bully, Sooraj, the captain of the under-19 Indian team. Sooraj is from a rich, influential background and is a very good bowler. He does his best to create problems for Virat's cricket.

Virat doesn't talk to everyone, but with his best friends Jo, Bunny, and Amara, he talks non-stop. Virat is tongue-tied whenever his crush, Shazia, is around.

On Virat's 15th birthday his grandfather comes to him in a dream and reveals that his family are superheroes. He realizes that he can use the powers of the heirloom, a kada (bracelet) for good, but the rule of the universe is that if there is good then there must also be evil. As the Superhero rises, so does the Supervillain, Navar, who has a plan to take over the world.

Virat must balance his home life with his friends, his love interest, saving the world, and must still find it within himself to win the world cup for India!

== Cast ==
- Vaibhav Thakkar as Virat Kohli / Super V
- Samay Raj Thakkar as Nawaal
- Anil Dutt as Virat's Grandfather
- Rishabh Arora as Bunny
- Mallika Singh as Amara / Shazia
- Nathan Dcosta as Jo (English)
- Ketan Kava as Jo (Hindi)
- Akash Chopra as the commentator (Cameo)

== Episodes ==
| No. | Title | Directed by | Original release date |
|---|---|---|---|
| 1 | "Can Dreams Become Reality?" | Puneet Sira | 5 November 2019 |
On Virat's sixteenth birthday, his grandfather appears in his dream, sitting in the crowd where he is playing cricket, with a red door and an antique lock on it as a background. Virat's parents want to keep his grandfather's life a secret. Meanwhile, an evil doctor has started mind-controlling a person, resulting in Virat's father's client happening to have an accident. Virat performs an heroic attempt to save Shazia, who was in danger during rehearsals of her show. After learning about this, his father gets angry with him, resulting in both of them being sad in their respective rooms.
| 2 | "The ABC's of Becoming a Superhero" | Puneet Sira | 10 November 2019 |
Virat learns the ABCs (Alert, Brave, Caring) of becoming a superhero from his grandfather in a dream while he and his friends try to find the secret door. Virat finds the secret locker in which his parents locked the ring, which provides superpowers.
| 3 | "Discovering the Powers" | Puneet Sira | 17 November 2019 |
Virat has discovered his superpowers, speed and strength. Elsewhere, his father gets to suspect of the truth behind all the events happening around the city. We get to see De. Ramanujan, who is the only one who can stop Navaar's plan. Navaar uses Sukhdev to take out Ramanujan, where the clash between Sukhdev and Ramanujan takes place.
| 4 | "With Power Comes Responsibility" | Ravinder Singh Bakshi | 24 November 2019 |
Virat learns that having superpowers is not fun and games, and that he needs to be careful. He wastes his power over showing it off to his friends rather than using it for helping others, and thus can't use it when he needs it the most (i.e., while meeting his favourite cricket Sachit Wadekar). In the end, his grandfather tells him the real spirit of having superpowers. Meanwhile, Navaar the villain makes his next move and plans to destroy the city by taking control over two more people.
| 5 | "The Rise of Super V" | Ravinder Singh Bakshi | 1 December 2019 |
Virat uses his powers to help people out with problems, preventing a catastrophic train collision, and people notice Super V for the first time. Virat saves the city from various threats and hence comes into the limelight. His father gets worried over him getting popular but notices Dr Ramanujan. Navaar connects Super V to Virat's school and decides to go there. An imminent terrorist attack on the school is seen in the precap.
| 6 | "Navaar Meets Super V" | Ravinder Singh Bakshi | 8 December 2019 |
Navaar comes to Virat's school for an assembly. Meanwhile, Navaar's fake pretend a terrorist attack on the school, in hopes Super V will appear. Super V appears and battles the commandos to free the school. The commandos are almost defeated when one of them throws a child of the building. Super V tries to reach the child, but is held back by a commando. The episode ends with the kid falling and Super V jumping off the building as well.
| 7 | "Downfall" | Gautmik | 22 December 2019 |
The scene continues from "Navaar Meets Super V"; the student is saved and bought to the ground. The commandos escape after being defeated. Later, Navaar is frustrated that his plans were ruined. He watches the news, on which a reporter comments "What if Super V was a supervillain?". This gives Navaar an idea. Later in the episode, Suhkdev is seen in a Super V costume, destroying bridges and buildings, and causing havoc. Later Super V is resented and hated.
| 8 | "Ramanujan Is the Key" | Gautmik | 29 December 2019 |
Virat and his friends search for Ramanujan to get to the bottom of the crisis. Amara connects Ramanujan's son, Venky, through his social media account to identify his friend. Virat as Super V goes to Benny's friend's house and gets information on where Benny is. Meanwhile, in a forest bunker, Ramanujan disrupts a control wave of Navaar's lab to make them lose control of the Sukhdev. Dr.Tech tries to locate the origin of the disruptor wave but is unsuccessful. However they regain control over Sukhdev. Virat and friends arrive at the bunker and are let inside by Ramanujan. Virat convinces Ramanujan to disrupt another wave to locate Dr.Tech, but instead, Navaar discovers the bunker location and sends 3 superhuman commandos to deal with Ramanujan. The episode ends with Super V fighting the commandos.
| 9 | "Navaar vs Super V" | Puneet Sira | 5 January 2020 |
Super V is engaged in a battle with 3 commandos, as the backup squad is on the way. At Navaar's lair, Dr.Tech reveals he has laser drones on standby, Navaar orders him to release all laser drones available. Back at the fight scene, the commandos appear to be defeated. Inside the bunker, Ramanujan and Virat's friends work to make an escape plan. Meanwhile, Virat's father spots the backup commandos and follows the copter by car. The drones arrive and fire lasers at Super V. The commando backup squad arrives followed by Virat's dad. The drones begin to overwhelm Super V, and Ramanujan hands video game remotes to Bunny and Amara to fire the bunker's lasers at the drones. The plan works and drones fall to the ground. The 3 commandos recover and attack Super V hurting him. Jo and Ramanujan send out a disruptor wave stronger than before and release Dr.Tech's control on the 3 commandos. Super V jumps up and uses one of Navaar's drones's lasers to destroy the other drones. Angered that his plan failed, Navaar declares he will deal with Super V himself and changes into an unseen form. The backup squad finds and entrance to the bunker and enter, successfully hitting Ramanujan with a bullet near the stomach. Ashok(Virat's dad) enters the bunker and finds Ramanujan and the kids. Ramanujan gives the wave disruptor technology to Ashok and tells him to take the children and Benny to somewhere safe. Ashok and the kids escape, while Ramanujan self-destructs the bunker, killing himself. Outside the bunker, an armored Navaar arrives, looking like some supervillain in a red and black metal armor. Super V battles Navaar and is winning, until Navaar releases some grenades. Super V dodges them and hits Navaar. However, Navaar freezes Super V's knee. Ashok, in an attempt to save Virat, runs out of the forest to get Navaar's attention. Navaar throws him to the floor and crushes the wave disruptor drive. Super V tries to attack Navaar but has a knee frozen again. As Super V yells in pain, Navaar steps on Ashok killing him, thinking he is Ramanujan.
| 10 | "To Be or Not to Be" | Puneet Sira | 12 January 2020 |
| 11 | "The Legacy" | Gautmik | 19 January 2020 |
| 12 | "The Hero Rises Again" | Puneet Sira | 26 January 2020 |

== Release ==
The series premiered simultaneously on 5 November 2019 across five Star India-owned networks - Disney Channel India, Marvel HQ, Star Sports and Star Plus as well as streaming service Hotstar. In North America, it was streamed exclusively on Hotstar USA, and in the United Kingdom, the series was aired on Star Plus UK. The series was dubbed into Bengali and broadcast on Star Jalsha.
