= David Haslam (physician) =

British physician

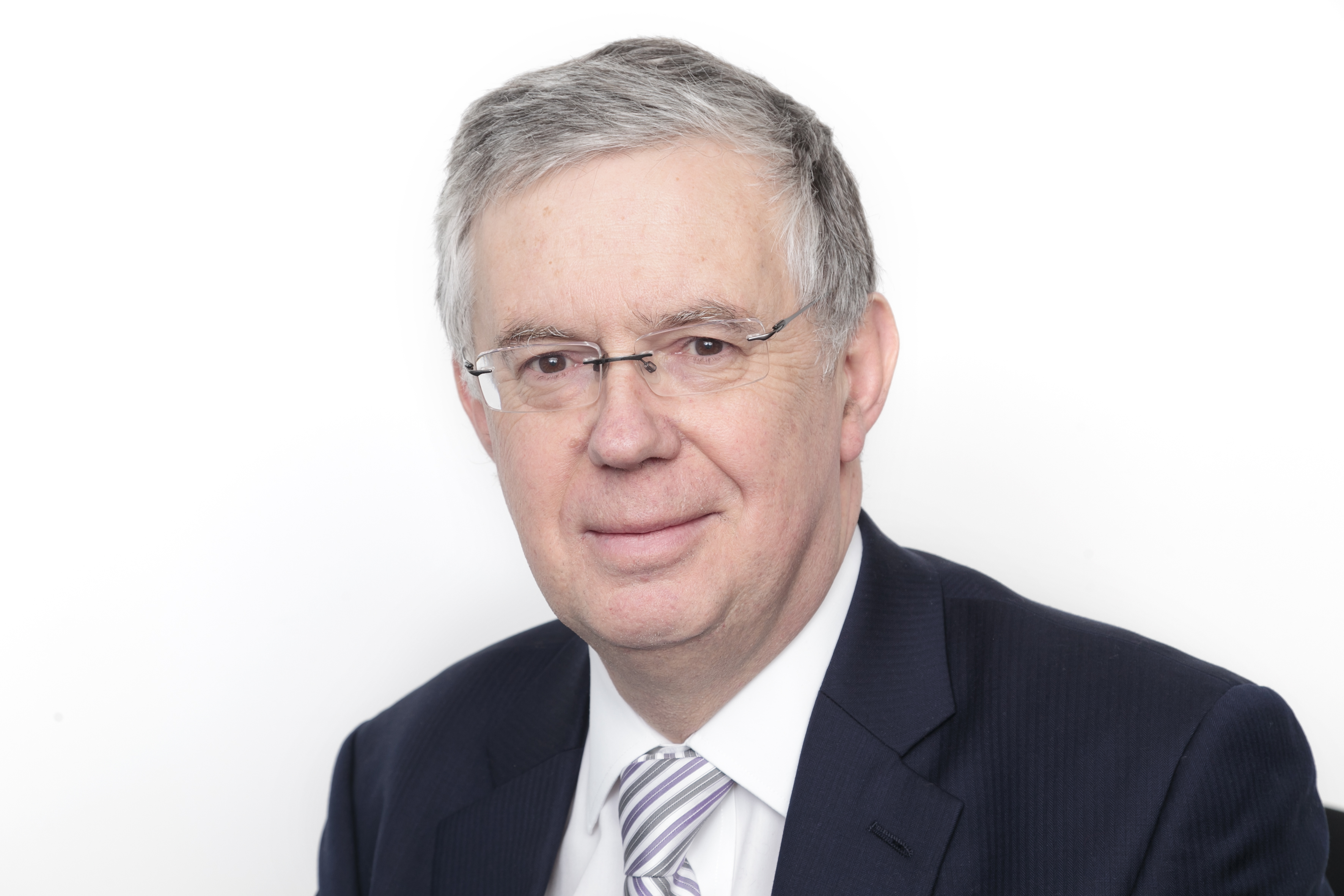

Sir David Anthony Haslam (born 4 July 1949) is a British medical doctor, writer and administrator.

== Education ==
Haslam was educated at Monkton Combe School and at the University of Birmingham (MB ChB, DObstRCOG, DFFP). In 1969, he led the Birmingham University contingent of the Commonwealth Expedition (Comex 3) overland from the UK to India.

== Medical career ==
Haslam worked for 36 years as a general practitioner in Ramsey, Cambridgeshire.

He was president of the British Medical Association (2011–12), President (2006-9) and chair (2001-4) of the Royal College of General Practitioners, and vice chair of the Academy of Medical Royal Colleges.

Haslam was chair of the National Institute for Health and Care Excellence from 2013 to 2019. He was an expert member of the NHS National Quality Board between 2009–14, a member of the NHS Modernisation Board between 2001 and 2004 and co-chair of the NHS Future Forum Information Group in 2011. Previously, he had been a member of the Postgraduate Medical Education and Training Board (PMETB) between 2003 and 2010, National Clinical Adviser to the Healthcare Commission between 2005 and 2009, and held the same role with the Care Quality Commission between 2009 and 2013.

In the Royal College of General Practitioners, he was appointed as a member of the panel of examiners between 1985 and 2000, chaired the Examination Board between 1993 and 2000, and was a nationally elected member of the RCGP Council between 1987 and 2009.

In 2020, he became Chair of the Trustee Board of the Charity CLIC Sargent, subsequently known as Young Lives vs Cancer..

He was said by the Health Service Journal to be the 30th most powerful person in the British National Health Service in December 2013. He was ranked (informally, as he was one of the judges) in the Health Service Journal's list of Clinical Leaders in 2015, and later reckoned to be the 15th most influential person in the English NHS in 2015. In 2014 he was listed in the Sunday Times and Debrett's list of the 500 most influential and inspirational people in the UK.

In 2014, he was appointed Professor of General Practice at the University of Nicosia, and from 2018- 2022 he was a Director of the State Health Services Organisation in Cyprus. In 2025 he was appointed Professor Emeritus at the University of Nicosia.

From 2020 to 2024, he was a Non-Executive Director of Dorset HealthCare University NHS Foundation Trust.

In 2024, he was appointed Non-Executive Chair of Itecho Health and also in 2024 he was appointed to the Council of St George's House, Windsor Castle.

His first articles appeared in the medical journal "World Medicine", and he subsequently published over 2000 articles in the medical and lay press. He has written 14 books, primarily on health and parenting related matters and aimed at the general public, published in 13 languages internationally. His most recent book, "Side Effects. How our healthcare lost its way, and how we fix it" was published in 2022, and was chosen as book of the week in The Observer.

== Honours ==
In 1989, he was awarded Fellowship of the Royal College of General Practitioners, in 2003 he was awarded Fellowship of the Faculty of Public Health, and in 2004 he was awarded Fellowship of the Royal College of Physicians. In 2010 he was conferred as an honorary Fellow of the Academy of Medical Educators.

In 2014, he received an honorary doctorate from University of Birmingham In 2016, he received a Doctorate of Science (Hon Causa) from the University of East Anglia.

He was awarded CBE in 2004 for "Services to Health Care", and he was Knighted in June 2018 for "Services to NHS Leadership".
