= Tim Lawrence (actor) =

British actor

- Occupation: Actor
- Height: 194 cm (6 ft 4 in)

Tim Lawrence is a British actor who acted in Bollywood films.

== Biography ==
Lawrence acted in I Proud to Be an Indian which was released in 2004. This film was his debut film in Bollywood. Later, he acted in Veer which was released in 2010.

== Filmography ==
Year	Film	Role	Notes
2004	I Proud to Be an Indian	Cain	Debut film
2010	Veer	Fraser	
