= Vekeana Dhillon =

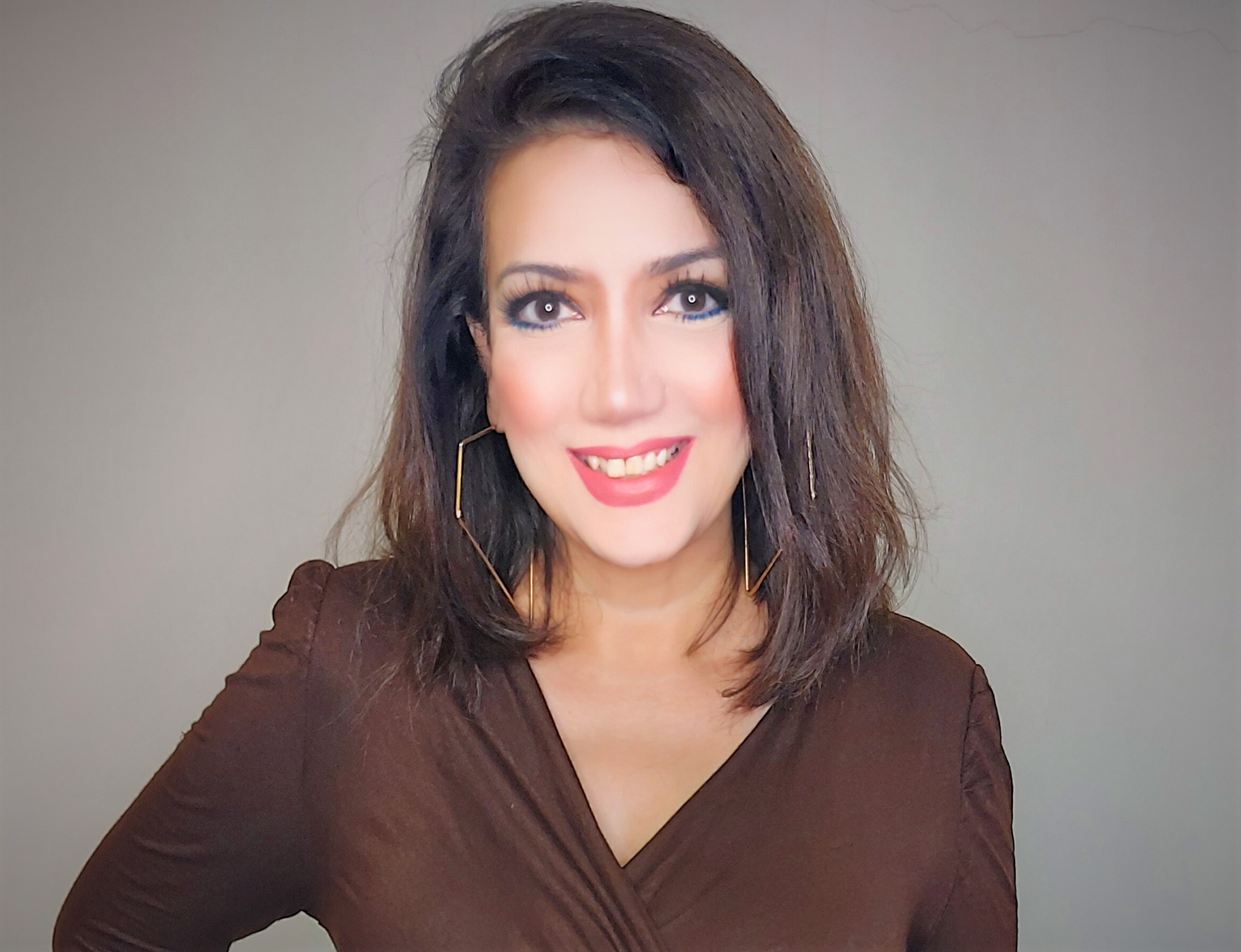
- Born: Delhi, India
- Occupations: Screenwriter, series creator, playwright, actor, television and radio presenter
- Spouse: Puneet Sira (m. 2010)
- Relatives: Vikram Dhillon (brother)

Vekeana Dhillon is a screenwriter, series creator, playwright, television presenter, radio presenter and actress.

== Early life and education ==
She was born in New Delhi, India and later her family migrated to Toronto, Canada. Raised in Alberta, Canada and went on to graduate with a Bachelor of Science from Simon Fraser University in British Columbia.

== Career ==
Uncovidable is the latest series Vekeana Dhillon has created and written based on her humorous and semi biographical account of her experiences during the COVID-19 lock-down. Season One of 21 episodes in English voiced by Mahira Kakkar released on 23 June 2020 on Amazon's Audible platform worldwide. Upon its success, the Hindi version of the series voiced by Rasika Dugal, was released on 24 September 2020 on Audible.in and Audible Suno.

Vekeana Dhillon has written the Virat Kohli animation superhero series Super V (2019-2020) for Disney+ Hotstar, Marvel HQ, Star TV Network, and Baweja Movies. It was directed by Puneet Sira and Season 1 premiered in over 70 countries on 5 November 2019 and went on to become the highest rated show in the animation bracket in India.

As a Series Creator she is writing several premium content shows that have secured placements on several major OTT platforms.

Vekeana is the creator and writer of The Great Punjabi Luv Shuv Story (2017) a series for Ekta Kapoor's digital channel Alt Balaji produced by Eyeline Entertainment.

Vekeana Dhillon has written the high end musical play Balle Balle (2017-2018) for Wizcraft International Entertainment, Directed by Viraf Sarkari.

She has had five feature films produced and released internationally among them being I - Proud To Be An Indian (2004) Produced by Sohail Khan and Directed by Puneet Sira, Jai Veeru (2009) Produced by Siddi Vinayak Movies, and Kisaan (2009) again Produced by Sohail Khan and Directed by Puneet Sira, and Pinky Moge Wali (2012) Directed by Vikram Dhillon.

Additional feature film scripts include Ji Karda (Eyeline Entertainment) Director Vikram Dhillon. The remake of Kurbani (FK International) and Hoshiyar Havaldar (Mirchi Movies). Her screenplay Foot It, a family/dance feature film, with Corus Entertainment / Rugged Media and a horror feature film for Telefilm Canada.

Dhillon's association with the entertainment industry was initially as an actor. Snip (2000) was her first feature film in which she played the tenacious gossip driven Delnaz Readymoney, followed by shorts for MTV in leading roles in Love Ke Liye and One Tight Slap which led to Bollywood Bound, a National Film Board of Canada documentary-feature following the lives of Vekeana Dhillon, Vikram Dhillon, Neeru Bajwa and Ruby Bhatia as transplanted Canadians in the world of Bollywood. Vekeana was hired by Rupert Murdoch's Channel [V] where she became the face and personality of several shows that she hosted including the channel's prime-time slotted [V] Dares U with co-host Yudi Urs and [V] Challenge with brother Vikram Dhillon.

Vekeana parlayed her Bollywood experiences as a contributor and reporter for the BBC Asian Network (U.K.) where she did a two-year stint with her own weekly half-hour slot on the Nikki Bedi Show, in addition to reporting for regional BBC stations in the UK. Vekeana shared her voice and news with the BBC World Service and BBC General News Service.

== Personal life ==
She is the daughter of Lyricist Harcharan Dhillon and retired Environmental Health Officer Dyal Singh Dhillon. She's worked extensively with her producer/director brother, Vikram Dhillon, and currently lives in India with her husband, noted director/producer Puneet Sira whom she married in 2010.

== Filmography ==
Year	Title	Language	Genre	Designation	Producer
2023	Pride and Prejudice	Hindi	Audio Series	Executive Producer	The Foundry / Audible Winner of "Best Audiobook Narration" Golden Mikes Radio & Audio Awards (2023).
2022	Sherlock Holmes Ki Romanchak Kahaniyan	Hindi	Audio Series	Executive Producer	The Foundry / Audible Winner of "Best Audiobook Narration" Golden Mikes Radio & Audio Awards (2023). Winner of "The Best Narration based on a Book" e4m Play Streaming Media Awards (2023)
2022	Kama Sutra	Hindi	Audiobook	Executive Producer	The Foundry / Audible Winner of "Audio Book of the Year" India Audio Summit & Awards (2022)
2022	Munshi Premchand's Karmabhoomi	Hindi	Audiobook	Executive Producer	The Foundry / Audible
2022	Raat Hone Ko Hai	Hindi	Limited Animation Series	Created and Written by	The Foundry / Ishara TV
2020	Uncovidable - Hindi	Hindi	Original Audio Series (21 episodes) (Literature Fiction)	Created and Written by	Audible Suno
2020	Uncovidable	English	Original Audio Series (21 episodes) (Literature Fiction)	Created and Written by	Audible
2019-2020	Super V	Hindi/English	TV series (12 episodes) (Superhero Animation)	Screenplay and Dialogues	Disney+Hotstar, Marvel HQ, Star TV, Baweja Movies.
2017-2018	Balle Balle	English	Musical Play (Comedy)	Playwright	Wizcraft International Entertainment
2018	The Tape	Hindi	Feature Film (Horror)	Written by	Pentacles Cinevision Pvt. Ltd.
2017	The Great Punjabi Luv Shuv Story	Punjabi	Series (Comedy) (13 episodes)	Created and Written by	AltBalaji / Eyeline Entertainment
2013	Ji Karda	Punjabi	Feature Film (Drama)	Written by	Eyeline Entertainment (Commission Script)
2012	Pinky Moge Wali	Punjabi	Feature Film (Comedy)	Screenplay	Batra Showbiz Productions
2011	Foot It	English	Feature Film (Family/Dance)	Written by	Jericho Beach Entertainment (Commissioned Script)
2009	Kisaan	Hindi	Feature Film (Drama)	Screenplay and Dialogues	Sohail Khan Productions
2009	Jai Veeru	Hindi	Feature Film (Action)	Screenplay	Siddhi Vinayak Movies
2007	Go! Miss India	Hindi	Feature Film (Rom-com)	Written by	Mirchi Movies Ltd (Times Group) (Commissioned Script)
2006-2008	Nikki Bedi Show	English	Radio (Weekly Bollywood Segment)	Host / Writer	BBC Asian Network (UK)
2006	Hoshiyar	Hindi	Feature Film (Comedy)	Written by	Mirchi Movies Ltd. (Times Group) (Commissioned Script)
2006-2008	BBC World Service	English	Radio (News Contributor)	Reporter	BBC Radio (UK)
2006	Kurbani	Hindi	Feature Film (Action)	Screenplay	F.K. International Pvt. Ltd. (Commissioned Script)
2006	Mogaveera	English	Documentary Film	Narrator	Visual-Eyes Entertainment
2005	Hit	Hindi	Feature Film (Action Comedy)	Written by	UTV Motion Pictures / Prakash Jha Productions (Commissioned Script)
2004	Maidaan	Hindi	Feature Film (Drama)	Written by	Neha Arts (Commissioned Script)
2004	Havaldar Hans	Hindi	Feature Film (Action Comedy)	Written by	Miracle Movies (Commissioned Script)
2004	I - Proud To Be An Indian	Hindi	Feature Film (Drama)	Screenplay and Dialogues	Sohail Khan Productions
2003	Spiceboy	English	Feature Film (Comedy)	Screenplay	Miracle Movies (Commissioned Script)
2003	Great India	Hindi	Feature Film (Action)	Written by	M.D. Productions (Commissioned Script)
2002	Bollywood Bound	English	Feature Film (Documentary)	Herself	National Film Board of Canada Director: Nisha Pahuja
2002	One Tight Slap	English	Short Film	Diva	MTV India - Director: Cyrus Oshidhar
2002	Love Ke Liya	English	Short Film	Queen	MTV India - Director: Cyrus Oshidhar
2000	Snip!	English	Feature Film	Delnaz Readymoney	Mercury Films - Director: Sunil Sippy
1999-2000	[V] Dares U	English	TV series	Host / Writer	Channel [V] Star TV Network
1999-2000	[V] Challenge	English	TV series	Host / Writer	Channel [V] Star TV Network
1999-2001	Live [V] Requests	English	TV series	Host	Channel [V] Star TV Network
1999-2000	Style Police	English	TV series	Guest Host	Channel [V] Star TV Network
1999-2000	Tea With [V]	English	TV series	Guest Host	Channel [V] Star TV Network
1998	BPL Oye!	English	TV series	Guest Host	Channel [V] Star TV Network
1998	Red Alert	English	TV series	Guest Host	Channel [V] Star TV Network (Hong Kong)
1998	By Demand	English	TV series	Guest Host	MTV India
1998	Tata Coffee	English	TV Commercial	Lead (Actor)	Far Productions - Director: Kailash Sundernath
1998	Pepsi Cola	English	TV Commercial	Lead (Actor)	Genesis Film Production - Director: Prahlad Kakkar
1997	Holy River	English	Theatre	Maya (Actor)	Work In Progress Productions. Director: Etienne Coutinho
1997	Vasvadata	English	Theatre	Vasvadata (Actor)	The Creators - Director: Janak Thoprani

== See also ==
- Women's Cinema
