= Pinky Moge Wali =

- Directed by: Vikram Dhillon
- Screenplay by: Vekeana Dhillon; Vikram Dhillon
- Story by: Vikram Dhillon
- Produced by: Rajan Batra; Swaran Singh
- Starring: Gavie Chahal; Neeru Bajwa; Geeta Zaildar; K S Makhan; Harpal Singh; Dhriti Saharan; B.N. Sharma; Rana Jung Bahadhur
- Cinematography: Dev Varma
- Edited by: Omkarnath Bakhari
- Music by: Jatinder Shah; Gurmeet Singh & Rohit Composer; Guri Bal
- Distributed by: Kapil Batra Production House Pvt. Ltd.
- Release date: 28 September 2012
- Country: India
- Languages: Punjabi, Hindi
- Budget: ₹ 4 Crores
- Box office: ₹ 9 Crores

Pinky Moge Wali is a 2012 Indian Punjabi-language, Hindi-language, film starring Neeru Bajwa, Gavie Chahal, Geeta Zaildar, K S Makhan, Harpal Singh, and B.N. Sharma as the prominent characters. Music for the film was given by Jatinder Shah, Gurmeet Singh, Rohit Composer and Guri Bal. The film started shooting in March 2012. The film was released on 28 September 2012.

The film's title, Pinky Moge Wali, comes from the popular character of Pinky introduced in the popular Punjabi movie Jihne Mera Dil Luteya. The title for the movie was bought for an undisclosed amount in big figures.

== Cast ==
- Gavie Chahal as Raj
- Neeru Bajwa as Pinky
- K S Makhan as Akaal
- Geeta Zaildar as Billu
- B.N. Sharma as Aatma Singh
- Rana Jung Bahadur as Parmattma Singh
- Harpal Singh as Sherdil Singh
- Avtar Gill as SSP Gill
- Shavinder Mahal as Pratap Singh Bajwa
- Dhriti Saharan in the song Thumka

== Soundtrack ==
Pinky Moge Wali

Soundtrack album by Mohit Chauhan, Shweta Pandit, Sonu Kakkar, Kamal Khan, Geeta Zaildar, K S Makhan, Gurlez Akhtar, Yuvraj Hans
- Released: 11 September 2012
- Genre: Feature film soundtrack
- Label: T-Series

No.	Title	Lyrics	Music	Singer(s)	Length
1.	"Je Main"		Gurmeet Singh, Rohit Composer	Shweta Pandit, Arun Daga	3:39
2.	"Darmiyaan"	Kumaar	Jatinder Shah	Mohit Chauhan	4:11
3.	"Tere Naina"	Guri Bal	Guri Bal	Yuvraj Hans	7:40
4.	"Tadka"		Gurmeet Singh, Rohit Composer	Sonu Kakkar	3:28
5.	"Jutti"	K. S. Makhan, Guri Bal	Guri Bal	K. S. Makhan	3:12
6.	"Hune Hune"	Kumaar	Jatinder Shah	Kamal Khan	3:31
7.	"Thumka"	Geeta Zaildar	Jatinder Shah	Geeta Zaildar, Yashita	3:47
8.	"Berry"	Kumaar	Jatinder Shah	Gurlez Akhtar	2:51
9.	"Sache Saheba"		Guri Bal	Gurmeet Singh Shaant	3:59
