= I – Proud to Be an Indian =

Indian action drama film

- Directed by: Puneet Sira
- Written by: Puneet Sira; Vekeana Dhillon; Sohail Khan; Jay Verma
- Screenplay by: Puneet Sira; Vekeana Dhillon; Sohail Khan
- Story by: Sohail Khan
- Produced by: Sohail Khan
- Starring: Sohail Khan; Kulbhushan Kharbanda; Aashif Sheikh; Hina Tasleem; Tim Lawrence
- Cinematography: Dev Verma
- Edited by: Rakesh Kumar Singh; Chirag Jain
- Music by: Daboo Malik
- Production company: Sohail Khan Productions
- Release date: 13 February 2004
- Running time: 145 minutes
- Country: India
- Languages: Hindi; Punjabi; English

I – Proud to Be an Indian is a 2004 Indian Hindi-language action drama film written and directed by Puneet Sira and produced by Sohail Khan.

The film, about racism against Asians in London, was shot in a span of thirty days in the UK.

== Plot ==
A Sikh couple alights from a bus at night on an isolated street; the woman is pregnant. They are followed by National Front white power skinheads and are brutally assaulted.

"I," along with his father, reach London. They go to the house of their son, who is living along with his wife, son, and teenage daughter. Later, they see the news and learn that the deceased bodies of a Sikh couple were found. Although it was declared a mugging, the local community suspected a racist attack. "I" and his family attend the last rites of the deceased couple at the local gurdwara.

Later on, the same skinheads attack an Indian store owner and believe that England belongs to the indigenous population. The family has to taste racism when the store is vandalized and the shopkeep is beaten. "I" learn of this and assault three of the gang members. His brother doesn't lodge a police complaint out of concern for his family's well-being and to avoid charges. He tells "me" to keep quiet for the safety of the family, which "I" reluctantly agree to.

"I" is attacked by a group of Pakistani expats. Their leader, Aslam, an owner of a local boxing club, suspects him of stealing his sister's necklace. He lets him go after his sister confirms "I" had saved her from a white racist group who tried to attack and assault her. In the ensuing chaos of the brawl, her necklace was left behind, which "I" recovered.

"I" finds out after an outing with the sister that one of the attackers in the Pakistani gang was the Aslam. Later on, "I" goes to the boxing club and challenge Aslam to a boxing match, which results in a respectful draw between the two. "I" reminds Aslam they are from the same culture, and traditions and part of the world, and even if they are from different countries, their people should always stick together and fight against racism and inequality and not side with the racists out of fear and just to lead a peaceful life.

The fight and this advice from "I" lead to the two having respect for each other and eventually lead to them becoming close friends. Aslam, after the powerful advice from "I," confronts the gang in his boxing gym; despite defeating a handful of members, he is brutally beaten. The gang goes on a rampage, committing arson in homes and storefronts. "I" confronts the group and faces off with Nicky (the gang leader of the racist group). After a grueling fight, "I" wins and is cheered on by the assembled crowd.

== Cast ==
- Sohail Khan as I Gill
- Kulbhushan Kharbanda as Kulwant Gill ; I's father
- Aashif Sheikh as Mr Gill ,I's brother
- Mona Ambegaonkar as Kamal Gill, I's sister in law.
- Hina Tasleem as Noor Firoz
- Tim Lawrence as Nicky Cain
- Imran Ali Khan as Aslam Firoz
- Kewal Shah as Aman Gill; Kamal and I's brother's son
- Kashmira Sunni as Kiran Gill; Kamal And I's brother's daughter
