= Jai Veeru =

2009 Indian action film

- DVD cover
- Directed by: Puneet Sira
- Screenplay by: Vekeana Dhillon
- Produced by: Narendra Bajaj; Shyam Bajaj
- Starring: Fardeen Khan; Kunal Khemu; Dia Mirza; Anjana Sukhani; Arbaaz Khan; Rajesh Khattar
- Cinematography: K Raj Kumar
- Edited by: Kuldeep Mehan
- Music by: Score: Raju Singh; Songs: Bappa Lahiri
- Distributed by: Siddhi Vinayak Movies
- Release date: 11 March 2009
- Running time: 160 minutes
- Country: India
- Language: Hindi
- Budget: ₹15 crore
- Box office: ₹39 crore

Jai Veeru is a 2009 Indian Hindi-language action comedy film directed by Puneet Sira, starring Fardeen Khan, Kunal Khemu, Anjana Sukhani, Dia Mirza and Arbaaz Khan. It is based on the 1996 American film Bulletproof. The film was released on 11 March 2009. It was a moderate success at the box office.

== Plot ==
Veer "Veeru" Sharma is a small-time crook working for a large drug importer, Tejpal. He is unaware that his best friend Jai Mehra is an undercover cop, seeking evidence against Tejpal. During a raid on Tejpal's warehouse, Veeru accidentally shoots Jai Mehra in the head but he miraculously survives and makes a full recovery.

Veeru then flees to Bangkok and is subsequently arrested. Jai Mehra is assigned the task of bringing back Veeru to testify against Tejpal. They confront each other, and seem to find their friendship still exists. They both decide to be friends again, when Veeru claims he has Tejpal's diary, which includes all his secrets and dealings. In a twist of events, Jai and Veeru attack Tejpal at his hideout. Tejpal shoots Veeru, while Jai attacks Tejpal and kills his GF Anna who's actually tejpal's mole and then jai ills tejpal. Jai lets Veeru flee before the cops arrive. Since then, the friendship of "Jai Veeru" lives on.

== Cast ==
Actor / Actress	Role
Fardeen Khan	Jai Mehra
Kunal Khemu	Veer "Veeru" Sharma
Dia Mirza	Anna
Arbaaz Khan	Tejpal
Anjana Sukhani	Divya
Rajesh Khattar	CBI Officer Chandok
Govind Namdev	Chief Insp. Ranbir Singh
Mahek Chahal	Item number "Agre Ka Ghagra"

== Soundtrack ==
Jai Veeru

Soundtrack album by Bappa Lahiri
- Released: February 2009
- Genre: Feature film soundtrack
- Length: 30:43
- Label: T-Series

The soundtrack of the film was composed by Bappa Lahiri, while the lyrics were penned by Sameer.

=== Track list ===
Track	Song	Artist(s)
1	"Sufi"	Tulsi Kumar, Saim Bhatt
2	"Tennu Le"	Omer Inayat
3	"Dhun Lagi"	Mika Singh, Raja Hasan
4	"Aisa Lashkara"	Hard Kaur, Rema Lahiri
5	"Agre Ka Ghagra"	Mouli Dave, Javed Ali & Raja Hasan
6	'"Dhun Lagi" (Progressive Dance Mix)	Mika Singh & Raja Hasan
7	"Sufi" (Rock)	Tulsi Kumar & Saim Bhatt
8	"Dhun Lagi" (Electro Mix)	Mika Singh & Raja Hasan
9	"Sufi"	Saim Bhatt
10	"Tennu Le"	Omer Inayat
11	"Tennu Le" (Remix)	DJ Akhil Talreja

== Critical response ==
Shubhra Gupta gave a negative review, writing ″Then they all get together and go looking for a plot. At one point, Veeru shoots Jai right in the middle of the forehead. The camera zooms in, and you see the hole, and the blood pouring out. Post-interval, Jai opens his eyes. Not even a bullet in the head can kill him. It's that kind of film.″ Taran Adarsh of Bollywood Hungama gave the film 1.5 stars out of 5, writing ″Fardeen Khan is below average. Kunal Khemu is better; the masses will like him. Dia Mirza and Anjana Sukhani don't have much to do, although Dia's character has an interesting twist in the climax. Arbaaz Khan is passable. Govind Namdeo is average. Rajesh Khattar and Rakesh Bedi are okay. On the whole, JAI VEERU has something for the hardcore masses, but nothing for the elite/classes. Its business, therefore, will be restricted to the single screens, but multiplexes will be terrible.″

== Accolades ==
Award Ceremony	Category	Recipient	Result	Ref.(s)
2nd Mirchi Music Awards	Upcoming Male Vocalist of The Year	Raja Hasan - "Dhun Lagi"	Won	
