= Kisaan =

- Theatrical release poster
- Directed by: Puneet Sira
- Screenplay by: Vekeana Dhillon; Sohail Khan
- Story by: Sohail Khan
- Produced by: Ronnie Screwvala; Sohail Khan
- Starring: Jackie Shroff; Arbaaz Khan; Sohail Khan; Dia Mirza; Nauheed Cyrusi
- Cinematography: Neelabh Kaul
- Edited by: Chirag Jain
- Music by: Songs: Daboo Malik; Background Score: Sanjoy Chowdhury
- Production companies: UTV Spotboy; Sohail Khan Productions
- Release date: 20 March 2009
- Running time: 100 minutes
- Country: India
- Language: Hindi
- Budget: ₹15 crore
- Box office: ₹5.76 crore

Kisaan (transl. Farmer) is a 2009 Indian Hindi-language action thriller film directed by Puneet Sira, starring Sohail Khan, Arbaaz Khan, Jackie Shroff, Dia Mirza and Nauheed Cyrusi. Released on 20 March 2009 to praise for Sohail Khan's performance but criticism for the story and music, the film was a commercial failure.

== Plot ==
Widower farmer Dayal Singh, based in Palheri in the District of Chandigarh, witnesses the exploitation of farmers at the hands of Zamindars. He decides to send his elder son, Aman, to the city to study and become a lawyer, while his second son, Jiggar, would live with him and assist him in farming. Years later, the district gets a visit from Sohan Seth, who wants to buy the farm and turn the area into a commercial zone. Aman returns home and is able to join hands with his father and brother in advising the locales against Sohan. Things get out of hand when Jiggar is arrested for assault, and even though Aman defends him, he is sentenced to five years in prison. After his discharge, Jiggar returns home to find his father bed-ridden, half of his body paralyzed, and a number of farmers have committed suicide, while Aman, who has married his sweetheart-fellow lawyer, Priya, lives in the city, works for Sohan, and has been putting pressure on Dayal as well as other farmers to sell their respective farmlands. Meanwhile, Priya is collecting proofs against Sohan Seth; she is attacked and killed by his men. Aman finds out, and he helps his brother in taking down his men. Aman reconciles with his father. Jigar marries Titli. They are shown working together on the family fields along with a recovering Dayal.

== Cast ==
- Sohail Khan as Jigar Singh
- Arbaaz Khan as Aman Singh
- Dia Mirza as Priya Kaur
- Jackie Shroff as Dayal Singh
- Dalip Tahil as Sohan Seth
- Peter Nunn as Mooney
- Nauheed Cyrusi as Titli Kaur
- Dwij Yadav as Young Aman Singh
- Naseer Abdullah as Advocate Kapoor
- Sharat Saxena as Sajjan Singh

== Soundtrack ==
Kisaan

Soundtrack album by Daboo Malik
- Released: 2009
- Genre: Feature film soundtrack
- Label: T-Series

| No. | Title | Artist(s) | Length |
|---|---|---|---|
| 1. | "Punjabi Munde" | Labh Janjua, Sunidhi Chauhan, Parthiv Gohil, Daboo Malik |
| 2. | "Humko Kehna Hai" | Shaan, Shreya Ghoshal |
| 3. | "Jhoomo Re Jhoomo" | Tarannum Malik, Pavni Pandey, Daboo Malik, Sujata Majumdar |
| 4. | "Neeche Saari Duniya" | Roop Kumar Rathod, Harshdeep Kaur |
| 5. | "Waqt Ki Dhoop" | Toshi Sabri |
| 6. | "Punjabi Munde (Remix)" | Daboo Malik, Shakti Singh, Amaal Malik |
| 7. | "Jind Da Ladla" | Shahid Mallya |

The soundtrack was composed by Daboo Malik and released by T-Series on 9 June 2009.

== Release ==
The film was theatrically released on 28 August 2009.

=== Home media ===
The film was released on DVD by Moser Baer.

== Reception ==
Shubhra Gupta from The Indian Express gave the film 2 stars out of 5, praising the first half while criticizing the second, especially the violence. Nithya Ramani of Rediff.com gave the film a half star out of 5, praising Sohail Khan's performance while criticizing the casting, other performances especially that of Arbaaz Khan and music.

In September 2009, a Sikh religious and cultural organisation filed a complaint against producer Sohail Khan, claiming that Khan has hurt the sentiments of the community by showing a Sikh character in the film lighting a cigarette, which is prohibited in their religion.
