= Shivgopal Krishna =

Indian film writer and director (born 1984)

S. Shivgopal Krishna
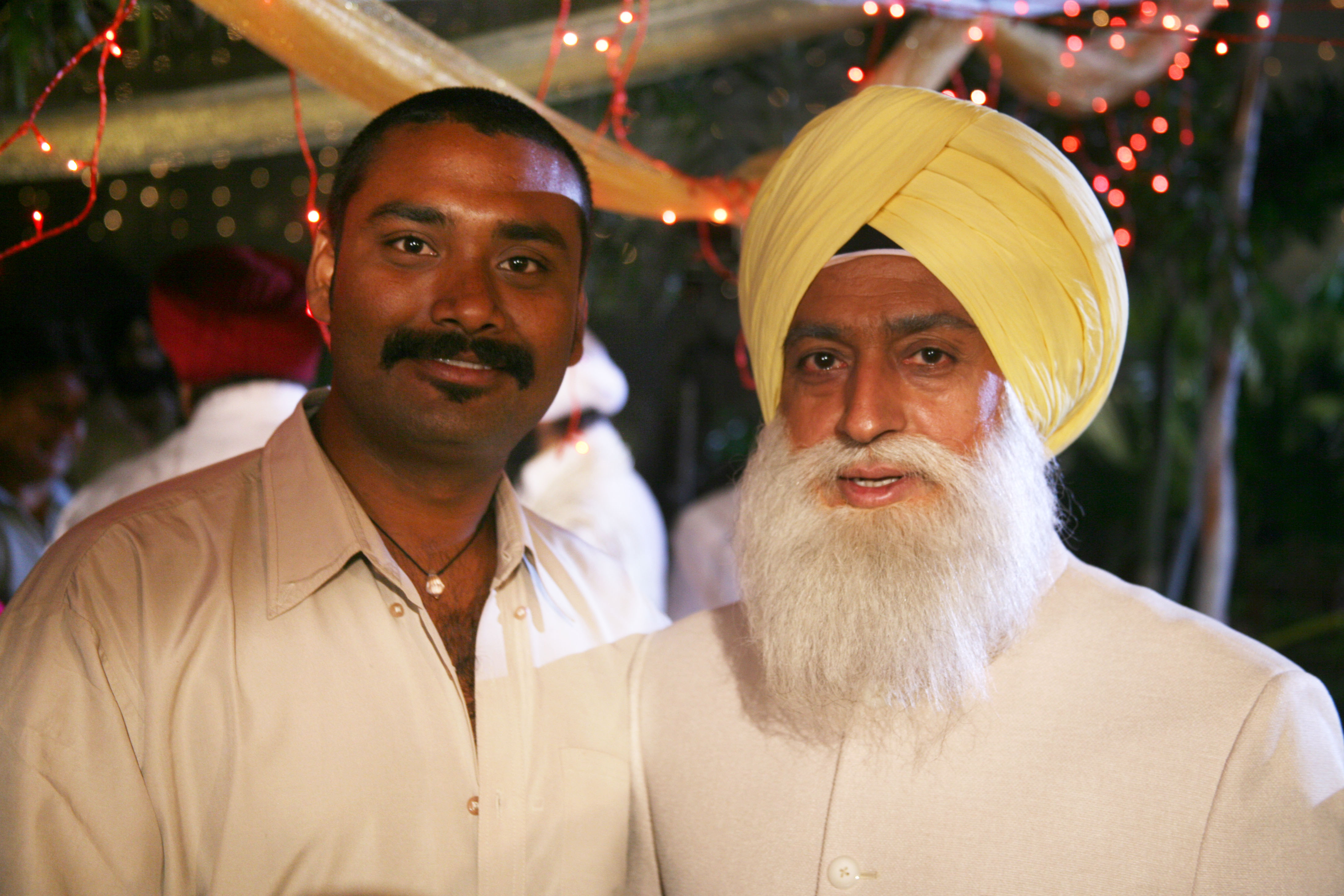
- Shivgopal Krishna with Gulshan Grover at Chhevan Dariya Punjabi film shoot
- Born: S. Shivgopal Krishna; 8 April 1990 (age 36); Agra, Uttar Pradesh, India
- Other names: Shivgopal, Shivaa
- Occupations: Writer, director, screenwriter
- Years active: 2004–present
- Website: shivvgopal.com

Shivgopal Krishna is an Indian film writer and director. He is best known in the Telugu film industry for his debutant written film Bank (2008). Recently he is working on a Hindi film script and planning to direct himself.

== Early life ==
Shivgopal was born in Agra, India, to a Telugu family. His father is a Government employee in BSNL. He had a Tamil-Telugu speaking upbringing in Agra.

== Education and early career ==
Shivgopal Krishna studied bachelor computer applications BCA in Agra and also has a bachelor's degree in Arts. He worked as an assistant director for Hindi, Tamil, Telugu, Punjabi movies and many TV series. He also worked as a writer for Bank. He worked as casting director for Sagar Pictures and Colosceum Media Pvt. Ltd.

== Filmography ==
=== Films ===
Year	Film	Credits	Language	Notes
2008	Ek Sach	Writer / Director	Hindi	Short
2009	Bank	Writer / Assistant Director	Telugu	
2010	Chhevan Dariya (The Sixth River)	Casting Director / Second Unit Director	Punjabi	
2012	Dasa Thirigindi	Casting Director / Second Unit Director	Telugu	
2013	Singam II	Dialogue Writer	Tamil	
2014	Race Gurram (Lucky:The Racer)	Dialogue Writer	Hindi	
2016	Sardaar Gabbar Singh	Dialogue Writer	Hindi	
2017	Nene Raju Nene Mantri (Main Hi Raja Main Hi Mantri)	Dialogue Writer	Hindi	
2018	K.G.F: Chapter 1	Dialogue Writer	Hindi	
2019	Pailwan	Dialogue Writer	Hindi	
2019	Untitled Hindi Thriller	Director	Hindi	Pre-production
2021	Master (Vijay the Master)	Dialogue Writer	Hindi	

=== Television ===
Year	Serial	Credits	Channel
2004–2005	Bechara Big 'B'	Assistant Director	Zee Smile
2007	Mata Ki Chowki	Assistant Director	Sahara One
2008–2009	Jai Shri Krishna	Casting Director	Colors
2015	Aahat (Season 6)	Second Unit Director	Sony
