= Zanane Rajsingh =

Indian film director (born 1988)

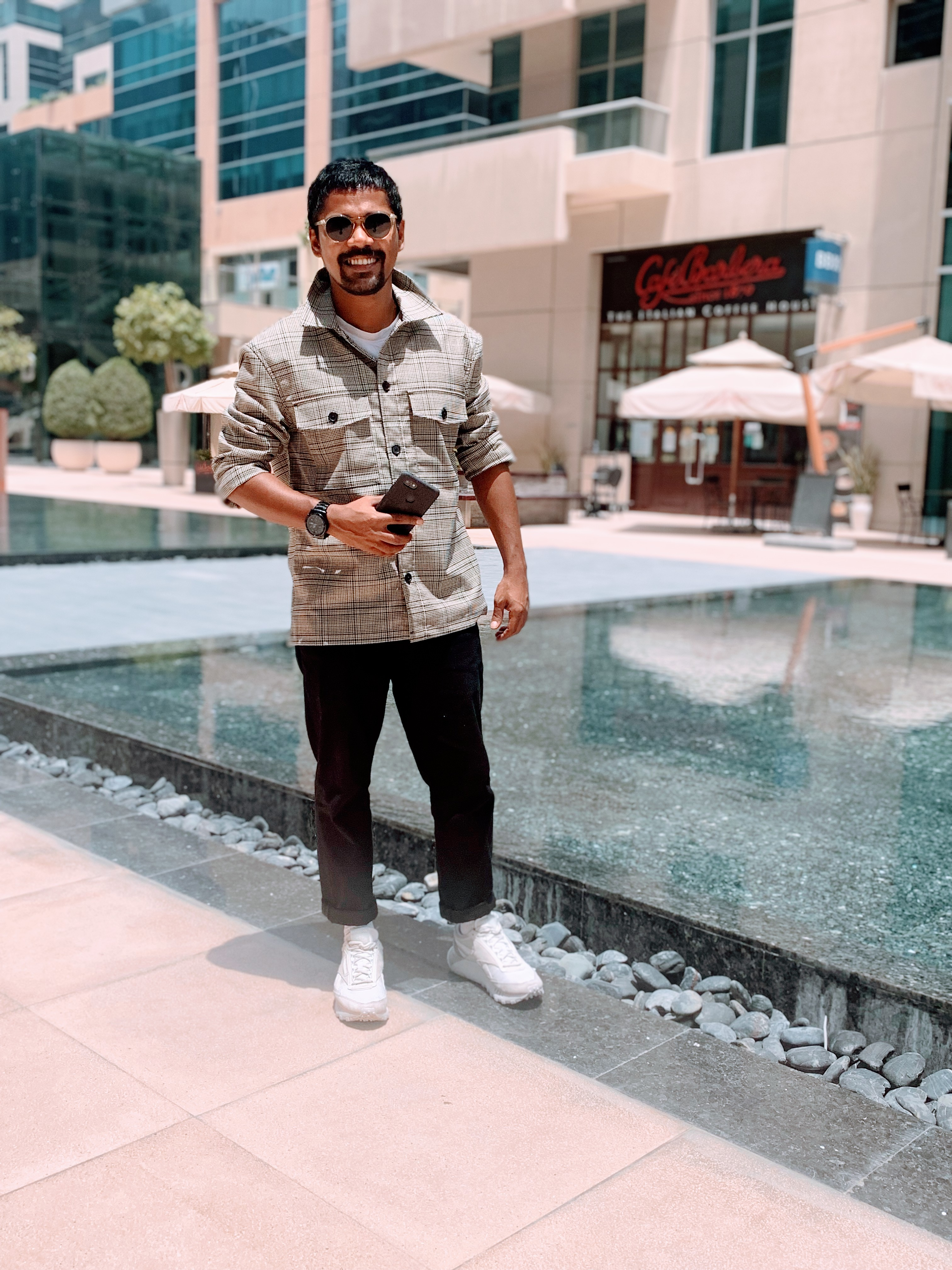
- Zanane Rajsingh in Dubai
- Born: 15 March 1988 (age 38); Kolhapur
- Occupations: Film director, film producer, screenwriter
- Years active: 2011-present

Zanane Rajsingh (born 15 March 1988 ) is an Indian film director. His debut film Beyond Blue - An Unnerving Tale of a Demented Mind, World Premiered on 16 May 2015 at 68th Festival de Cannes Marche du Film and the film was digitally released on Amazon Prime on December 2, 2019 He was recently awarded at 8th Gauravvanta Gujarati Awards for his contribution to Gujarat State for making films and taking Gujarati community worldwide. His next is a Gujarati film entitled 'Colorbaaj' which is based on underground parties in Ahmedabad He is currently making a film on the topic of the climate change and its adverse effects titled It's Tomorrow - The Film. The film is written by Dr. Rajeshkumar Acharya and is being produced in the United States and India. He worked as a Creative Producer for Visioneers Dubai, a studio run under the PMO office of UAE. In 2023, he attended the Bahrain International Film Festival where he announced his under development film Morpankh and two web shows called No Love, Please and BlueBird.

== Early life and education ==
Zanane Rajsingh was born in Kolhapur, Maharashtra in 1988. He studied at National Public School, Indore and St. Paul's Higher Secondary School, Indore where his family resides in Harsiddhi Colony. His father works as a logistic manager in a private firm in Ahmedabad and his mother is a retired school teacher. He currently resides in Ahmedabad, Gujarat.

== Career ==
In 2009, Zanane Rajsingh moved to Pune to work for a Multinational corporation where he continued working till 2011. While working there, he made a 16-minute short film A Candle Light Event based on the German bakery blast in Pune in 2010, which garnered appreciation from the film festivals.

In 2013, he directed psychological thriller short film Hastkala. He then developed this short film into a feature film called as Beyond Blue - An Unnerving Tale of a Demented Mind which went on the floor by end of 2014. It had its world premiere at Cannes 2015. He is currently busy his directorial venture – It's Tomorrow, a climate fiction feature film on climate change which produced by an Indo-US based film production company Nanoland Group. He was awarded at 8th Gauravvanta Gujarati Award, 2015 for making films in Gujarat and representing Gujarat internationally.

== Filmography ==
Year	Film	Format	Director	Writer	Producer
2024	Unsaid: The Silent Battles	Music Video	Yes	Yes	Yes
2024	Parinda: Code and Canvas	Music Video	Yes	Yes	Yes
2024	Morpankh (under-development)	Feature Film	Yes	Yes	Yes
2023	No Love, Please!	Mini-TV Show	No	No	Producer
2023	Blue Bird	Mini-TV Show	No	No	Producer
2023	Pechino Express	Reality TV Show	No	No	India Line producer
2022	Veli (English title:Field)	Feature Film	No	No	India Line producer
2021	Mabrouk Ateya Talk Show	TV Talk Show	No	No	Executive producer
2021	Al Sununu	TV series	No	No	Creative Producer
2018	Sa'at Bansaha	Music Video	Yes	Yes	No
2018	Zero KMs	TV series	Chief Assistant Director	No	No
currently in production	It's Tomorrow	Documentary Film	Yes	No	Executive producer
2017	Colorbaaj	Feature Film	Yes	Yes	Yes
2015	Beyond Blue - An Unnerving Tale of a Demented Mind	Feature Film	Yes	Yes	Executive producer
2013	Khone De - A story of every Nirbhaya	Music Video	Yes	Yes	Yes
2012	Hastkala - An art of hand	Short Film	Yes	Yes	Yes
2011	Aaj ki Taaza Khabar	Short Film	Yes	Yes	Yes
2011	Anurupata	Short Film	Yes	Yes	Yes
2011	Ashru - Tears in Heaven	Short Film	Yes	Yes	Yes
2011	A Candle Light Event	Short Film	Yes	Yes	Yes
