= Commonwealth Expedition =

Multiculturalism journey to India

The Commonwealth Expedition or Comex started in 1965 as an expedition from Britain to India in support of the multicultural ideals of what was then called the British Commonwealth. The idea was conceived by Lt Colonel Lionel Gregory, OBE, late of Queen's Gurkha Signals, who attributes some of the ideas to conversations he had with Indian prime minister Jawaharlal Nehru. Nehru invited young people "to organise a new consciousness in the Commonwealth through cultural and intellectual activities as well as common adventure." Nehru's death in 1964 led to the cancellation of the project, but at the invitation of the Government of India, an expedition of 204 young people set out from London on 30 July 1965. This was Comex 1.

In India, the five contingents from Cardiff, London, Oxford, Cambridge and Edinburgh visited different regions - then known as Calcutta, Madras, Bombay, Rajasthan, and Lucknow. They all met up again in Simla – staying at the Viceregal Lodge and performing at the Gaiety Theatre.

Comex came under the patronage of Prince Philip, Duke of Edinburgh. The young participants, mostly students, had been trained by the Royal Air Force to be drivers, navigators, and radio operators.

The history of Comex is outlined in several books by its founder and leader, Lionel Gregory OBE. They include Crying Drums, With a Song and not a Sword, Together, Unafraid, and Journey of a Lifetime.

The model has been followed subsequently at regular intervals, for a total of 14 expeditions, overland across the Asian Highway, within India itself, and into Africa, with Zambia serving as a base.

Comex 11 flew from London to Delhi and toured India from Simla in the North to Ootacamund in the South. Led again by Lnt Colonel Lionel Gregory and George Brew. The contingent was ostensibly from Manchester, including police officers and cadets. The parties age ranged from 20 to 72 and transport through India was mainly train including Bombay, Chandigarh and Amritsar.

== Comex 1 (1965) ==
The first expedition set off from London on 30 July 1965, with 204 participants travelling overland in five buses via Europe and the Middle East. They conducted a programme of cultural exchange in the capital of each country they visited, arriving in India on 30 August 1965.

The journey was not easy. There were barely roads through the searingly hot desert approaching Pakistan. They were received by the not-yet Prime Minister, Indira Gandhi, and by the president of India Dr Radhakrishnan. Shortly after entering India, war broke out between India and Pakistan. Buses driving at night had to observe a strict black-out.

The border war made the planned overland return journey impossible. The participants flew home.

The coaches were sold to the Indian Government Tourist Organisation, and did many years' service.

A reunion on 17 and 18 October 2015 – 50 years after the first Comex – took place at the High Commission of India's Nehru Centre. As many of those who joined the first expedition and who could be contacted were invited. Eighty people out of the original participants came to the event and shared their memories, photographs keepsakes found in innumerable lofts. A souvenir brochure was produced with the help of Massey Ferguson who had sponsored the 1965 expedition and were honoured guests at the reunion.

=== Participants ===
These included

- Robin Denselow
- John Gerson
- Malcolm Rifkind
- John Bibby, son of Cyril Bibby
- Joe Millward

== Comex 2 (1967) ==
Comex 2 set off from London on 19 July 1967, with around 330 students travelling in 11 coaches, each from a different part of the UK. The participants performed concerts along the route and raised money for famine and drought relief. They spent three weeks in India and Pakistan and met the Prime Minister, Indira Gandhi.

On the return journey one of the coaches, carrying students mostly from Newcastle and Durham universities, collided with a crane near Zagreb, killing 14 students. The student driver was arrested and sentenced to six years in prison in Yugoslavia but was pardoned and released 12 days into his sentence.

== Comex 3 (1969) ==
Training and planning were improved for the third expedition, which went ahead with the blessing of the parents of those killed in the Comex 2 crash.

The expedition had 20 contingents each of 25 members, based on the UK Universities of Birmingham, Bristol, Cambridge, Cardiff, Durham, Edinburgh, Exeter, Glasgow, Keele, Kent, London, Leicester, Lancaster, Liverpool, Manchester, Newcastle, Oxford, Sussex, St. Andrews, and Bradford (as a combined Yorkshire contingent). But the participants included many representatives of other sectors such as the police, the armed forces and the health service.

All 500 participants took part in a training camp at Wollaton Park in Nottingham in July, with the expedition's 20 coaches setting off from London on 15 July and returning on 8 October.

=== Participants ===
These included

- Jon Snow
- David Haslam

== Comex 4 (1970) ==
A fourth expedition was planned for July 1970 for 525 participants to travel to Sri Lanka, Malaysia and Singapore as well as India and Pakistan. However, due to financial constraints this was scaled back and smaller trips of 21 participants went to each location to develop an itinerary for Comex 5.

== Comex 5 (1972) ==
600 participants

== Comex 6 (1974) ==
The size of the contingents was 20 per coach. There were 200 participants: 120 from Canada and USA, and 80 from UK. The route to India was via Greece, Turkey, Iraq, Iran, and Pakistan.

== Later expeditions ==
- Comex 7 (1975), 134 participants
- Comex 8 (1977), 300 participants
- Comex 9 (1979)
- Comex 10 (1980), 200 participants in a train journey as a tribute to Lord Mountbatten

Later expeditions travelled to other parts of the world, including one to Zambia in 1985.

Colonel Gregory died in Edinburgh on February 17, 2014.
