= Border (soundtrack) =

Border (Original Motion Picture Soundtrack)
- Soundtrack album cover

Soundtrack album by Anu Malik
- Released: 13 June 1997
- Recorded: 1997
- Genres: Motion Picture Soundtrack; Hindi Film Music
- Length: 41:36
- Languages: Hindi; Hindustani
- Label: Venus Records & Tapes
- Producer: Anu Malik

Anu Malik chronology
Virasat (1997)	Border (Original Motion Picture Soundtrack) (1997)	Hameshaa (1997)
External audio
- Border (Full Album) on YouTube

Singles from Border
- 1. "Sandese Aate Hai" Released: 1 April 1997; 2. "To Chalun" Released: 1 April 1997; 3. "Hindustan Hindustan" Released: 1 April 1997; 4. "Mere Dushman Mere Bhai" Released: 1 April 1997; 5. "Hamen Jab Se Mohabbat" Released: 1 April 1997

Border (Original Motion Picture Soundtrack) is the soundtrack album to the 1997 Hindi-language epic war film of the same name written and directed by J. P. Dutta, featuring an ensemble cast of Sunny Deol, Jackie Shroff, Suniel Shetty, Akshaye Khanna, Puneet Issar, Sudesh Berry and Kulbhushan Kharbanda. The album featured five songs composed by Anu Malik and written by Javed Akhtar. All the songs from the film, became popular after its release, with the album being the fourth-highest selling Indian soundtrack of the year. "Sandese Aate Hai" emerged as one of the popular film songs of all-time, with Akhtar winning the National Film Award for Best Lyrics and Hariharan won the National Film Award for Best Male Playback Singer for "Mere Dushman".

== Background and production ==
The background score for the film was composed by Aadesh Shrivastava, while the songs’ music was composed by Anu Malik with the lyrics penned by Javed Akhtar. Sonu Nigam, Roop Kumar Rathod, Hariharan, Alka Yagnik, Shankar Mahadevan and Sunali Rathod were the playback singers. All the songs in the film had a duration of more than seven minutes, compiling the total album's length to more than 40 minutes long. Akhtar was initially hesitant on composing music for Border owing how the India–Pakistan war of 1971 can be translated into an epic war film, but when he heard the script, he immediately wrote lyrics for the songs.

Malik recalled that Dutta had shown him pictures of the soldiers manning the borders. Malik, who had been in the mood to make light-hearted songs, suddenly felt him emotional, and in the process, he recorded a love song. While Dutta was impressed by it, he needed another song that wanted him to capture the intended emotions. After looking at the picture again, Malik felt emotional, to which Dutta said, "These tears will now help you create music" and brought him on board for the film.

Dutta and Akhtar then visited Malik at his residence for the music composing session. When they recited the lyrics of "Sandese Aate Hai", he felt the song did not have a mukhda and antara and as the script went on for 11–15 pages, Malik questioned them when the song would end to which Akhtar insisted Dutta to provide the script to Malik for one month, and after that, he would compose the song. Initially, the tune for "Sandese Aate Hai" was conceived for another unmaterialized project. When Akhtar narrated the situation, he played the particular tune which he liked but it felt that it was a free verse, and the song had particular lines to be inserted.

While composing the tune for "Sandese Aate Hai", he also sang the lyrics as well, which astonished Akhtar. An extra verse was also added in the tune, though it did not feel in sync with the tune, but then Malik composed the song in one go, ensuring that the recording would not be delayed and then the whole song was composed within seven-and-a-half minute duration. (Note: The song still had duration of 10 minute long, in the digital album.) Roopkumar Rathod was brought in for the song, as Malik seen him at his residence, and also chose Nigam, who was a budding singer at that time, and earlier promised him to rope him for one song.

== Reception and legacy ==
The soundtrack became immensely popular after the film's release. Vipin Nair of Film Companion ranked it at the 82nd position on the Top 100 Bollywood Albums, adding "Border focussed on the hardships faced by soldiers at war, and hence gave Malik and lyricist Javed Akhtar the opportunity to produce some soulful tracks that explored love and longing and loss, rather than just patriotic feelings." He also cited "Mere Dushman" as one of the best songs from the album. "Sandese Aate Hai" has been considered the best patriotic song, according to Filmfare. According to the Indian trade website Box Office India, with around 45,00,000 units sold the soundtrack became the fourth highest-selling album of the year.

Dutta admitted that Akhtar's lyrics were "so beautiful, that they automatically kept flowing into visuals" aiding him the filming process. Anu Malik also added that the success of Border, while established him more popularity, also helped him get rid of the unfair allegations of plagiarism levied against him. He would also reunite with Dutta for the two of his Refugee (2000) and LOC: Kargil (2003). Nigam, who sang the song "Sandese Aate Hai" recalled, that, the song became way more popular than he expected. But he also displeasure on the co-singer Rathod not being shared credits for the award.

At a screening of LOC: Kargil, Dutta told Malik that an Indian soldier joined the army after hearing "Sandese Aate Hai" and died in the Kargil War, and the soldier's mother thanked him for making the film, as it led her son "live again". The album's popularity was not only restricted to India, but also in Pakistan as well. Jupinderjit Singh of The Tribune added, "The Pakistan farmers on the tractors, however, have a special liking for songs from the film Border."

== Track listing ==
No.	Title	Singer(s)	Length
1.	"Sandese Aate Hai"	Sonu Nigam, Roop Kumar Rathod	10:22
2.	"Mere Dushman Mere Bhai"	Hariharan	09:36
3.	"Hamen Jab Se Mohabbat"	Sonu Nigam, Alka Yagnik	07:32
4.	"To Chalun"	Roop Kumar Rathod	07:20
5.	"Hindustan Hindustan"	Shankar Mahadevan, Sonali Rathod	09:27
Total length:			41:36

== Awards and nominations ==
Award (Note: Awards, festivals and organisations are in alphabetical order.)	Date of ceremony (Note: Date is linked to the article about the awards held that year, wherever possible.)	Category	Recipient(s)	Result	Ref.
Filmfare Awards	31 January 1998	Best Music Director	Anu Malik	Nominated	
Filmfare Awards	31 January 1998	Best Lyricist	Javed Akhtar for "Sandese Aate Hai"	Won	
Filmfare Awards	31 January 1998	Best Male Playback Singer	Sonu Nigam, Roopkumar Rathod for "Sandese Aate Hai"	Nominated	
Filmfare Awards	31 January 1998	Best Sound Recording	Vinod Potdar	Won	
National Film Awards	10 July 1998	Best Lyricist	Javed Akhtar for "Sandese Aate Hai"	Won	
National Film Awards	10 July 1998	Best Male Playback Singer	Hariharan for "Mere Dushman Mere Bhai"	Won	
Screen Awards	17 January 1998	Best Music Director	Anu Malik	Nominated	
Screen Awards	17 January 1998	Best Background Music	Aadesh Shrivastava	Won	
Screen Awards	17 January 1998	Best Lyricist	Javed Akhtar for "Sandese Aate Hai"	Won	
Screen Awards	17 January 1998	Best Male Playback Singer	Sonu Nigam, Roopkumar Rathod for "Sandese Aate Hai"	Nominated	
Screen Awards	17 January 1998	Best Re-recording	Suresh Kathena	Won	
Zee Cine Awards	14 March 1998	Best Music Director	Anu Malik	Nominated	
Zee Cine Awards	14 March 1998	Best Background Score	Aadesh Shrivastava	Nominated	
Zee Cine Awards	14 March 1998	Best Lyricist	Javed Akhtar for "Sandese Aate Hai"	Won	
Zee Cine Awards	14 March 1998	Best Playback Singer – Male	Sonu Nigam for "Sandese Aate Hai"	Won	
Zee Cine Awards	14 March 1998	Best Song Recording	Satish Gupta	Won	

== Use in sequel ==
The songs "Sandese Aate Hai", "To Chalun", "Hindustan Hindustan", and "Hamen Jab Se Mohabbat" were recreated by Mithoon for the sequel Border 2. Malik noted that the producer Bhushan Kumar had credited him as the composer of reused songs and Javed Akhtar as the original writer of those songs, and considered it a unique collaboration he was genuinely proud of. This squashed misinformation regarding on how Malik demanded credits for the song.
