= 4th Screen Awards =

Awards for Hindi-language films of 1997

- Date: 17 January 1998
- Site: Andheri Sports Complex, Mumbai
- Hosted by: Jaaved Jaaferi

Highlights
- Best Picture: Border
- Best Direction: J. P. Dutta (Border)
- Best Actor: Anil Kapoor (Virasat)
- Best Actress: Madhuri Dixit (Mrityudand)
- Most awards: Border (7)
- Most nominations: Virasat (15)

The 4th Screen Awards also The fourth Annual Screen–Videocon Awards ceremony, presented by Indian Express Group, honoured the best Indian Hindi-language films of 1997. The ceremony was held on 17 January 1998 at Andheri Sports Complex, Mumbai, hosted by Jaaved Jaaferi and co-hosted by Achala Sachdev.

Virasat led the ceremony with 15 nominations, followed by Border with 11 nominations, Pardes with 9 nominations and Dil To Pagal Hai with 8 nominations.

Border won 7 awards, including Best Film and Best Director (for J. P. Dutta), thus becoming the most-awarded film at the ceremony.

== Awards ==
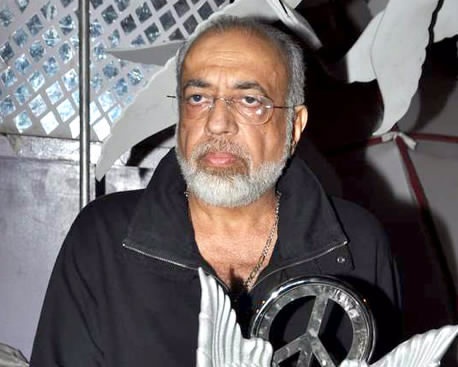
J. P. Dutta — Best Director for Border

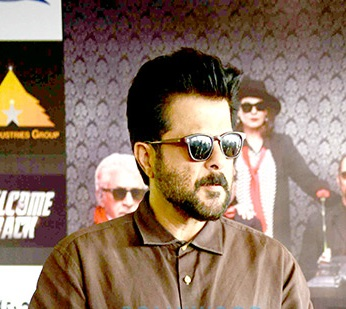
Anil Kapoor — Best Actor for Virasat

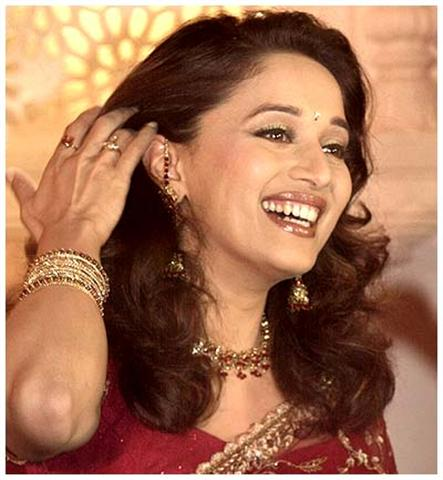
Madhuri Dixit — Best Actress for Mrityudand

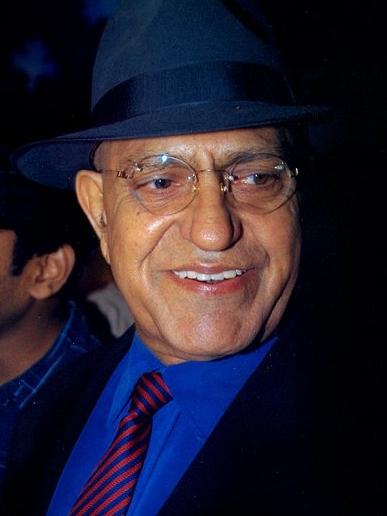
Amrish Puri — Best Supporting Actor for Virasat

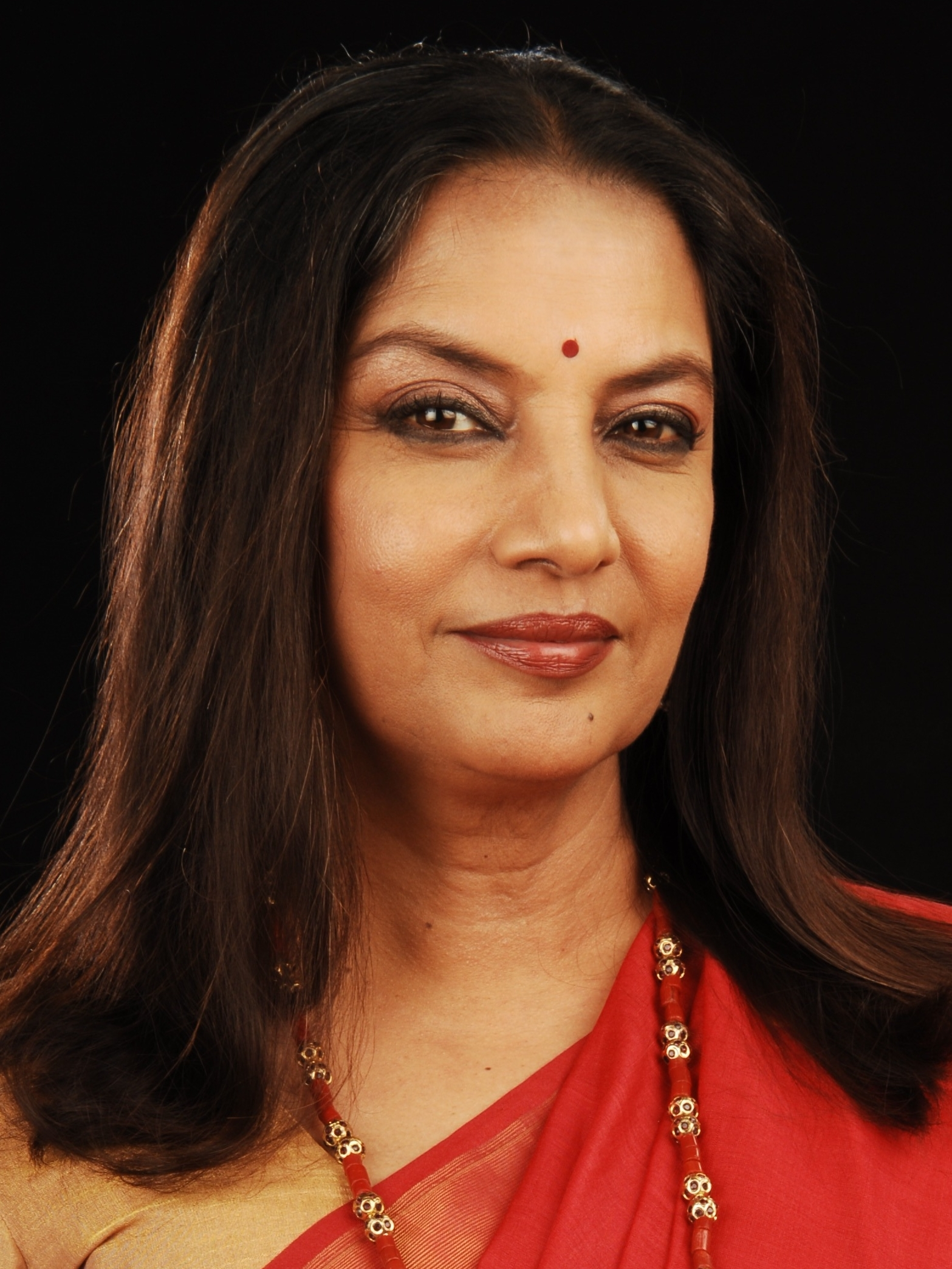
Shabana Azmi — Best Supporting Actress for Mrityudand

The winners and nominees have been listed below. Winners are listed first, highlighted in boldface, and indicated with a double dagger (‡).

=== Jury Awards ===
Best Film	Best Director
**Border**‡; Chachi 420; Mrityudand; Pardes; Virasat	**J. P. Dutta – Border**‡; Kamal Haasan – Chachi 420; Prakash Jha – Mrityudand; Priyadarshan – Virasat; Subhash Ghai – Pardes
Best Actor	Best Actress
**Anil Kapoor – Virasat**‡; Aamir Khan – Ishq; Govinda – Deewana Mastana; Kamal Haasan – Chachi 420; Shah Rukh Khan – Dil To Pagal Hai	**Madhuri Dixit – Mrityudand**‡; Juhi Chawla – Yes Boss; Rekha – Aastha: In the Prison of Spring; Sridevi – Judaai; Tabu – Virasat
Best Supporting Actor	Best Supporting Actress
**Amrish Puri – Virasat**‡; Om Puri – Gupt: The Hidden Truth; Paresh Rawal – Chachi 420; Sayaji Shinde – Darmiyaan: In Between; Shivaji Satam – Ghulam-E-Mustafa	**Shabana Azmi – Mrityudand**‡; Aruna Irani – Ghulam-E-Mustafa; Karisma Kapoor – Dil To Pagal Hai; Pooja Batra – Virasat; Smriti Mishra – Sardari Begum
Most Promising Newcomer – Male	Most Promising Newcomer – Female
**Akshaye Khanna – Himalay Putra**‡; Apurva Agnihotri – Pardes; Arif Zakaria – Darmiyaan: In Between	**Aishwarya Rai – Aur Pyaar Ho Gaya**‡; Mahima Chaudhry – Pardes; Pooja Batra – Virasat
Best Actor in a Negative Role	Best Background Music
**Mohan Joshi** – **Mrityudand**‡; Deepa Sahi – Aar Ya Paar; Jackie Shroff – Aar Ya Paar; Milind Gunaji – Virasat; Mohan Joshi – Yeshwant	**Aadesh Shrivastava** – **Border**‡
Best Music Director	Best Lyricist
**Nadeem–Shravan – Pardes**‡; Anu Malik – Border; Anu Malik – Virasat; Jatin–Lalit – Yes Boss; Uttam Singh – Dil To Pagal Hai	**Javed Akhtar – "Sandese Aate Hai" – Border**‡; Anand Bakshi – "Do Dil Mil Rahe Hain" – Pardes; Anand Bakshi – "I Love My India" – Pardes; Gulzar – "Labon Se Chumlo" – Aastha: In the Prison of Spring; Javed Akhtar – "Main Koi Aisa Geet Gaoon" – Yes Boss
Best Male Playback Singer	Best Female Playback Singer
**Abhijeet Bhattacharya – "Main Koi Aisa Geet Gaoon" – Yes Boss**‡; Hariharan – "Hum Tumse Na Kuchh" – Ziddi; Kumar Sanu – "Do Dil Mil Rahe Hain" – Pardes; Roopkumar Rathod, Sonu Nigam – "Sandese Aate Hai" – Border; Udit Narayan – "Dil To Pagal Hai" – Dil To Pagal Hai	**K. S. Chithra – "Payalay Chunmun" – Virasat**‡; Alka Yagnik – "Tanhai Tanhai" – Koyla; Asha Bhosle – "Le Gayi" – Dil To Pagal Hai; Kavita Krishnamurti – "Mr. Lova Lova" (Ankhiyaan Tu Mila Le) – Ishq; Shweta Shetty – "Kaale Kaale Baal" – Ziddi

=== Technical Awards ===
Best Story	Best Screenplay
**Kamal Haasan** – **Virasat**‡; J. P. Dutta – Border; Sahiwal – Mrityudand	**J. P. Dutta – Border**‡; Anil Ajitabh, Prakash Jha, Rajan Kothari – Mrityudand; Kamal Haasan – Virasat
Best Dialogue	Best Cinematography
**Hriday Lani** – **Yeshwant**‡; O. P. Dutta – Border; Sanjay Chhel – Yes Boss	**Kabir Lal** – **Pardes**‡; Manmohan Singh – Dil To Pagal Hai; Ravi K. Chandran – Virasat
Best Editing	Best Production Design
**M. Gopala Krishana** – **Virasat**‡	**Sharmishta Roy** – **Dil To Pagal Hai**‡
Best Choreography	Best Action
**Shiamak Davar** – **Dil To Pagal Hai**‡	**Biku Verma, Tinu Verma** – **Border**‡
Best Audiographer	Best Re-recording
**Deepan Chatterji** – **Virasat**‡	**Suresh Kathena** – **Border**‡

=== Special awards ===
Lifetime Achievement Award
- **Suraiya**
Special Jury Award
- **Govinda**
Ramnath Goenka Award
- **Dilip Kumar**

== Superlatives ==
Multiple nominations
Nominations	Film
15	Virasat
11	Border
9	Pardes
8	Dil To Pagal Hai
7	Mrityudand
5	Yes Boss
4	Chachi 420
2	Aar Ya Paar
2	Aastha: In the Prison of Spring
2	Darmiyaan: In Between
2	Ghulam-E-Mustafa
2	Ishq
2	Yeshwant
2	Ziddi

Multiple wins
Awards	Film
7	Border
6	Virasat
3	Mrityudand
2	Dil To Pagal Hai
2	Pardes
