= 1998 Zee Cine Awards =

1st Zee Cine Awards
- Date: 14 March 1998
- Site: Mumbai
- Hosted by: Kitu Gidwani; Shekhar Suman; Shahrukh Khan; Aishwarya Rai; Salman Khan; Karisma Kapoor; Mahima Chaudhry; Sonali Bendre
- Official website: www.zeecineawards.com

Highlights
- Best Film: Dil To Pagal Hai
- Best Director: J. P. Dutta (Border)
- Best Actor: Shah Rukh Khan (Dil To Pagal Hai)
- Best Actress: Madhuri Dixit (Dil To Pagal Hai)
- Most awards: Dil To Pagal Hai (10)
- Most nominations: Dil To Pagal Hai (27)

The 1st Zee Cine Awards ceremony honouring the winners and nominees of the best of Bollywood cinema films released in 1997. The ceremony was held on 14 March 1998 in Mumbai.

Dil To Pagal Hai led the ceremony with 27 nominations, followed by Border and Pardes with 19 nominations and Ishq with 10 nominations.

Dil To Pagal Hai won 10 awards, including Best Film, Best Actor (for Shah Rukh Khan), Best Actress (for Madhuri Dixit) and Best Supporting Actress (for Karisma Kapoor), thus becoming the most-awarded film at the ceremony.

== Main Awards ==
The winners and nominees have been listed below:

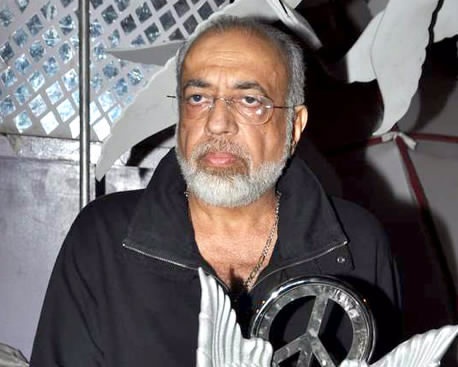
J.P. Dutta — Best Director winner for Border

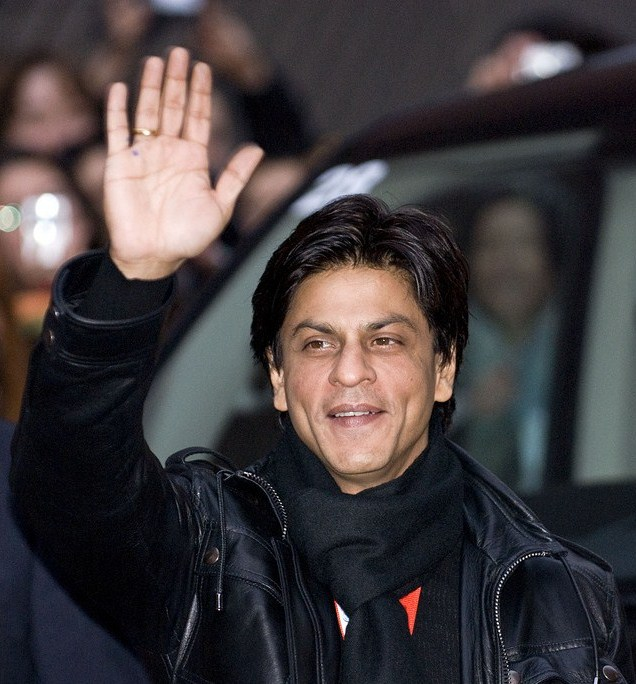
Shahrukh Khan — Best Actor winner for Dil To Pagal Hai

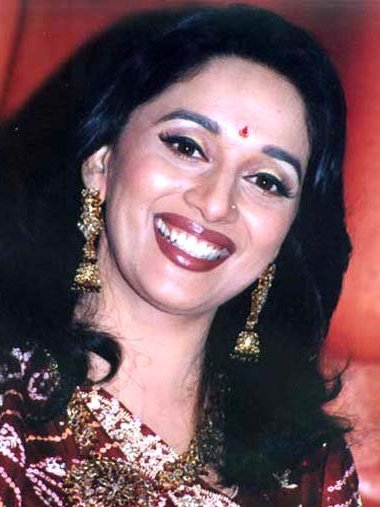
Madhuri Dixit — Best Actress winner for Dil To Pagal Hai

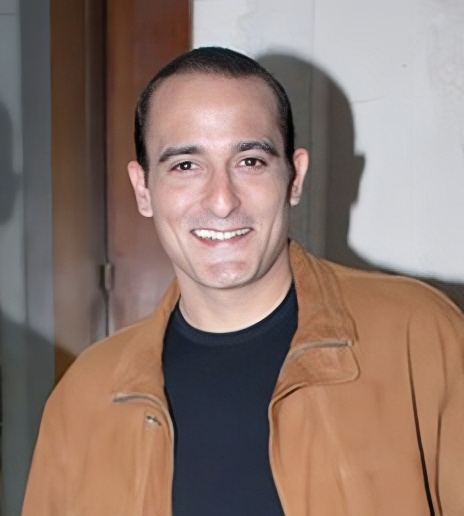
Akshaye Khanna — Best Supporting Actor winner for Border

Best Film	Best Director
Dil To Pagal Hai; Border; Gupt; Ishq; Pardes	J. P. Dutta – Border; David Dhawan – Hero No. 1; Rajiv Rai – Gupt; Subhash Ghai – Pardes; Yash Chopra – Dil To Pagal Hai
Best Actor	Best Actress
Shahrukh Khan – Dil To Pagal Hai; Aamir Khan – Ishq; Kamal Haasan – Chachi 420; Shahrukh Khan – Pardes; Sunny Deol – Border	Madhuri Dixit – Dil To Pagal Hai; Juhi Chawla – Ishq; Kajol – Gupt; Mahima Chaudhry – Pardes; Karisma Kapoor – Hero No. 1
Best Supporting Actor	Best Supporting Actress
Akshaye Khanna – Border; Ajay Devgan – Ishq; Apurva Agnihotri – Pardes; Kader Khan – Hero No. 1; Sunil Shetty – Border	Karisma Kapoor – Dil To Pagal Hai; Farida Jalal – Dil To Pagal Hai; Kajol – Ishq; Pooja Batra – Virasat; Urmila Matondkar – Judaai
Best Performance in a Villainous Role	Best Performance in a Comic Role
Kajol – Gupt; Aditya Pancholi – Yes Boss; Amrish Puri – Koyla; Ashish Vidyarthi – Ziddi; Sadashiv Amrapurkar – Ishq	Kamal Haasan – Chachi 420; Govinda – Deewana Mastana; Johnny Lever – Deewana Mastana; Johnny Lever – Ishq; Kader Khan – Hero No. 1
Best Debut – Male	Best Debut – Female
Akshaye Khanna – Himalay Putra; Apurva Agnihotri – Pardes; Arbaaz Ali Khan – Mrityudaata; Rajeev Goswami – Border; Swapnil Joshi – Ghulam-E-Mustafa	Mahima Chaudhary – Pardes; Aishwarya Rai – Aur Pyaar Ho Gaya; Pooja Batra – Virasat; Sapna Bedi – Border; Sharbani Mukherjee – Border
Best Music Director	Best Lyrics
Uttam Singh – Dil To Pagal Hai; Anu Malik – Border; Anu Malik – Ishq; Nadeem-Shravan – Pardes; Viju Shah – Gupt	Javed Akhtar – "Sandese Aate Hai" – Border; Anand Bakshi – "Bholi Si Surat" – Dil To Pagal Hai; Anand Bakshi – "Dil To Pagal Hai" – Dil To Pagal Hai; Anand Bakshi – "I Love My India" – Pardes; Sameer – "Sona Kitna Sona Hai" – Hero No. 1
Best Male Playback Singer	Best Female Playback Singer
Sonu Nigam – "Sandese Aate Hai" – Border; Kumar Sanu – "Do Dil Mil Rahe Hain" – Pardes; Udit Narayan – "Are Re Are Ye Kya Hua" – Dil To Pagal Hai; Udit Narayan – "Bholi Si Surat" – Dil To Pagal Hai; Udit Narayan – "Dil To Pagal Hai" – Dil To Pagal Hai	Lata Mangeshkar – "Dil To Pagal Hai" – Dil To Pagal Hai; Asha Bhosle – "Le Gayi" – Dil To Pagal Hai; Kavita Krishnamurthy – "I Love My India" – Pardes; Lata Mangeshkar – "Are Re Are Ye Kya Hua" – Dil To Pagal Hai; Poornima – "Sona Kitna Sona Hai" – Hero No. 1
Best Story	Best Screenplay
J. P. Dutta – Border; Kamal Haasan – Chachi 420; Pamela Chopra – Dil To Pagal Hai; Subhash Ghai – Pardes; Rajiv Rai – Gupt	Vinay Shukla – Virasat; J. P. Dutta – Border; Prakash Jha, Rajan Kothari, Anil Ajitabh – Mrityudand; Rumi Jaffrey – Hero No. 1; Yash Chopra, Tanuja Chandra, Pamela Chopra – Dil To Pagal Hai
Best Dialogue	Best Cinematography
Prakash Jha – Mrityudand; Aditya Chopra – Dil To Pagal Hai; Gulzar – Chachi 420; O. P. Dutta – Border; Shama Zaidi – Sardari Begum	Manmohan Singh – Dil To Pagal Hai; Ishwar B. Bidri – Border; Rajan Kothari – Mrityudand; S. M. Kabirlal – Pardes; Sanjay Dharankar – Sardari Begum
Best Choreography	Best Action
Shiamak Davar – Dil To Pagal Hai; Farah Khan – Virasat; Nimesh Bhatt – Hameshaa; Rekha Prakash – Gupt; Roshan Kumari – Sardari Begum	Tinu Verma – Ziddi; Bhiku Verma – Koyla; Kala Singh – Mohabbat; Sham Kaushal – Yeshwant; Veeru Devgan – Ishq
Best Editing	Best Art Direction
Deepak Wirkud, Vilas Ranade – Border; Dilip Kotalji, Zafar Sultan – Hameshaa; Renu Saluja – Pardes; V. N. Mayekar – Bhai; V. V. Karnik – Dil To Pagal Hai	Sharmishta Roy – Dil To Pagal Hai; Bijon Dasgupta – Gupt; Leeladhar S. Sawant – Ziddi; Nitin Chandrakant Desai – Ishq; Samir Chanda – Sardari Begum
Best Background Score	Best Sound Recording
Vanraj Bhatia – Pardes; Aadesh Shrivastava – Border; Amar P. Haldipur – Hero No. 1; Salim–Sulaiman – Hameshaa; Uttam Singh – Dil To Pagal Hai	Rakesh Ranjan – Pardes; Navin Zaveri – Koyla; Anuj Mathur – Dil To Pagal Hai; Jitendra Chaudhary – Hameshaa; V. M. Gandhi – Lahu Ke Do Rang
Best Make Up Artist	Best Re-Recording
Pradeep Premgirikar – Prithvi; Kiran R. Naik – Pardes; Mustaq Mansur – Deewana Mastana; Sadanand Shedge – Tamanna; Subodh H. Shelke – Border	B.K. Chaturvedi – Mrityudand; Anand Recording – Gudgudee; Anup Dev – Pardes; Hitendra Ghosh – Sardari Begum
Best Costume Design	Best Song Recording
Pia Benegal – Sardari Begum; Kashmera Shah– Gudgudee; Manish Malhotra – Dil To Pagal Hai	Satish Gupta – Border; Hassan Sheikh – Pardes
Best Special Effects (Visual)
Sai Prasad – Dil To Pagal Hai; Ramesh Meer – Pardes

== Special awards ==
Lifetime Achievement Award: Dilip Kumar	Lux Face of the Year: Mahima Chaudhry

== Superlatives ==
Multiple nominations
Nominations	Film
27	Dil To Pagal Hai
19	Border
19	Pardes
10	Ishq
8	Hero No. 1
6	Chachi 420
6	Gupt
6	Sardari Begum
4	Hameshaa
4	Mrityudand
4	Virasat
3	Deewana Mastana
3	Koyla
3	Ziddi
2	Gudgudee

Multiple wins
Awards	Film
10	Dil To Pagal Hai
7	Border
3	Pardes
2	Mrityudand

== Presenters ==
Name	Role
Sarika; Nirupa Roy	Presenters of the award for Best Story
Shabana Azmi; Jagjit Singh	Presenters of the award for Best Female Playback Singer Yash Chopra accepted it on behalf of Lata Mangeshkar
Indra Kumar; Sadhana Sargam	Presenters of the award for Best Male Playback Singer Anu Malik accepted it on behalf of Sonu Nigam
Shahrukh Khan; Aishwarya Rai	Presenters of the award for Best Lyrics
Reena Roy	Presenter of the award for Best Supporting Actress Yash Chopra accepted it on behalf of Karisma Kapoor, although she collected her award after her part of hosting the show with Salman Khan
Asha Parekh	Presenter of the award for Best Supporting Actor Akshay Sethi accepted it on behalf of Akshaye Khanna
Karisma Kapoor; Salman Khan	Presenters of the award for Best Performance in a Villainous Role
Bindu; Shashikala	Presenters of the award for Best Performance in a Comic Role
Sunil Dutt	Presenter of the award for Best Film
Zeenat Aman	Presenter of the award for Lux Face of the Year
Javed Akhtar	Presenter of the award for Lifetime Achievement Award
Mohammed Zahur Khayyam; Sajjad Gul	Presenters of the award for Best Music Director
Jackie Shroff	Presenter of the award for Best Debut - Female
Juhi Chawla; Raveena Tandon	Presenters of the award for Best Debut - Male Akshay Sethi accepted it on behalf of Akshaye Khanna
Shatrughan Sinha; Sultan Ahmed	Presenters of the award for Best Director
Hema Malini; Smita Thackeray	Presenters of the award for Best Actress Yash Chopra accepted it on behalf of Madhuri Dixit
Kajol; Gordhan Tanwani	Presenters of the award for Best Actor Shahrukh Khan resigned his award and gave it to Salman Khan, although it wasn’t because Salman Khan because of him being nominated for this award but because of the entertainment Salman Khan gave on stage which turned out to be the best highlight.

== Sources ==
- Zee Cine awards
- YouTube
- Awards and Shows
