= Virasat (1997 film) =

1997 Indian film by Priyadarshan

- Poster
- Directed by: Priyadarshan
- Screenplay by: Vinay Shukla
- Story by: Kamal Haasan
- Based on: Thevar Magan by Bharathan
- Produced by: Mushir-Riaz
- Starring: Anil Kapoor; Amrish Puri; Tabu; Pooja Batra; Milind Gunaji; Govind Namdeo
- Cinematography: Ravi K. Chandran
- Edited by: N. Gopalakrishnan
- Music by: Songs: Anu Malik; Score: S. P. Venkatesh
- Distributed by: M. R. Productions Pvt Ltd
- Release date: 30 May 1997; (India)
- Running time: 168 minutes
- Country: India
- Language: Hindi
- Box office: est. ₹20.73 crore

Virasat (transl. Inheritance) is a 1997 Indian Hindi-language action-drama film, directed by Priyadarshan. The story was adapted from the Tamil film Thevar Magan. The story was written by Kamal Haasan and remade after the success of the Tamil film Thevar Magan. Mushir-Riaz duo produced the film. It stars Anil Kapoor, Tabu, Amrish Puri, Pooja Batra, Milind Gunaji and Govind Namdeo. The music was composed by Anu Malik and S. P. Venkatesh, with the former composing the songs and the latter composing the score. The film marked the comeback for Priyadarshan in Hindi cinema. Music director Annu Malik reused some of the original tunes of Ilaiyaraaja from Thevar Magan. Tabu has done beatboxing in this movie for the song "Payale Chunmun".

Virasat received sixteen nominations at the 43rd Filmfare Awards, including Best Film, Best Director for Priyadarshan, Best Actor for Kapoor, Best Actress for Tabu, and Best Supporting Actress & Best Female Debut for Batra, and won in seven categories, including Best Film (Critics), Best Actor (Critics) for Kapoor, Best Actress (Critics) for Tabu, Best Supporting Actor for Puri, and Best Story for Haasan.

== Plot ==
After completing his studies in London, Shakti Thakur (Anil Kapoor) returns to his ancestral village in India. Accompanying him is his girlfriend, Anita (Pooja Batra), whom he is in love with and wants to marry, much to the disapproval of his family. After a few days, Shakti starts to feel that nothing much has changed in his hometown and longs to leave. He tells his father that he wants to sell his share of the family's property and open a chain of restaurants. His father, the zamindar Raja Thakur (Amrish Puri), urges Shakti to stay in the village and help it progress by virtue of the latter's education, saying "A man gets an education not to become a selfish being but to uplift his uneducated brothers and society". Shakti disagrees with his father and decides to leave. He is unable to bear the animosity amongst the townspeople, particularly between his dad, Raja Thakur, and rival his younger brother Zamindar Birju (Govind Namdeo) (Shakti's disabled uncle) and his son Bali Thakur.

The entire village suffers from this longstanding family feud as most of the village and its surrounding areas is divided between the brothers. Since Bali Thakur holds a grudge and always tries to one-up Raja Thakur, it puts them at loggerheads with each other.

Shakti spends time in the village with his girlfriend by re-visiting his childhood memories including a game of sticks with Bali Thakur men, which he wins. They come across an old temple which has been closed off on Bali Thakur's instructions. He insists on entering and his friend and servant Surkhiya breaks open the lock for them to look around. Bali Thakur hears of this, and a brutal riot is started among the two village factions. Raja Thakur, in order to quell the situation, contemplates apologising to his opponents. Shakti feels it should be him or Surkhiya who should apologise. When Shakti asks for Surkhiya, he learns that Bali Thakur's men have cut off Surkhiya's hand as punishment for opening the temple and Raja Thakur's men burn down the homes of Bali Thakur villagers in retaliation. To prevent a further escalation of the situation Shakti, with permission from his father, enlists the help of his friend in the government and opens the temple for all legally. Slighted by this, Bali Thakur hires goons to break a dam protecting a part of the village faction that supports Raja Thakur. Although a female villager spots one of the goons near the dam, she does not think much of it.

The dam is damaged by explosives used by the goons which results in flooding of half the village. This results in numerous deaths including infants which deeply saddens Shakti. He spots the goon who placed the explosives again in the village and gives chase. After capturing, he hands the goon over to the police, but the goon does not speak of Bali Thakur's involvement due to fear for his own family's safety.

Later Bali Thakur intimidates a villager Narayandas living in Raja Thakur's area to close a portion of his land, preventing the public from reaching the main road easily. Shakti and his father invite them for talks at village Panchayat to resolve the standoff due to the riots and flooding. In the village panchayat, accusations fly from both sides. With no evidence backing up the truth, Bali Thakur accuses Raja Thakur for orchestrating various attacks on his brother's family and insults him relentlessly. Disrespected and heartbroken, Raja Thakur returns to his home and dies following a heart attack later that night. Shakti takes over his father's duties as the head of the village.

As time passes, this incident dies down. The villagers express concern to Shakti about going around the piece of land that has been closed off and causes a much longer travelling time. Shakti reasons with the owner of the land Narayandas (Satyen Kappu) to open it up for all villagers to pass so that their long commute is shortened. Although understanding and willing, the landowner, is afraid of Bali Thakur's backlash especially since he has a young daughter Gehna (Tabu). Shakti assuages his fear by arranging marriage between a well-to-do person from his village to the landowner's daughter. Everybody involved happily agrees and the landowner opens up the land for everyone.

On the day of the wedding, the groom runs away, fearing Bali Thakur. The landowner and his daughter are distraught over this claiming that it is a huge disrespect to his family. He opines that even if someone marries his daughter, they have to live in constant fear. Shakti then gets permission from the landowner and weds his daughter. Although Shakti still has feelings for his girlfriend and his new bride is very shy, they overcome their awkwardness and move on. Soon, his girlfriend returns and learns the truth. Although saddened by the turn of events, she understands the situation and leaves. Shakti, too, closes the chapter about his girlfriend and starts his new life with his wife.

Bali Thakur, enraged by the opening of the land, plants a bomb during the village festival despite the pleas of his mother and own father to stop the violence. This results in deaths on both sides of the village. Both factions of the village, wanting revenge, go after Bali Thakur and his family. Shakti protects the innocent family and helps them get away from the villagers. Appreciative of Shakti's efforts to protect them, Birju Thakur finally ends his enmity towards him.

Shakti eventually finds Bali Thakur and asks him to surrender to the police before the villagers kill him. Bali Thakur's rabid hatred for Shakti makes him reject his offer of help. Bali Thakur, blaming Shakti for all his problems, tries to kill him. In the struggle that follows, Shakti accidentally decapitates Bali Thakur. Although other villagers are willing to take the blame for Bali Thakur's murder, Shakti gives himself up to the police to end the cycle of violence once and for all.

The film depicts the true meaning of education as "a tool to uplift uneducated people".

== Cast ==
- Anil Kapoor as Shakti Thakur
- Tabu as Gehna Thakur, Shakti Thakur's wife.
- Pooja Batra as Anita, Shakti's girlfriend.
- Amrish Puri as Raja Thakur
- Milind Gunaji as Bali Thakur
- Govind Namdeo as Birju Thakur
- Satyen Kappu as Narayandas
- Dilip Dhawan as Shakti's brother
- Neeraj Vora as Surkhiya
- Sulabha Deshpande as Bali's mother
- Tiku Talsania as Bali's Lawyer
- Rita Bhaduri as Mausi
- Reena as Raja's wife
- Kollam Ajith as Inspector
- Ajay Rathnam as Inspector

== Production ==
Kamal Haasan initially planned to remake Thevar Magan film in Hindi with himself in the lead role, and approached Dilip Kumar to play the role portrayed by Sivaji Ganesan in the original. Kumar's refusal prompted Haasan to become disillusioned with the project, and led him to offering the script to Anil Kapoor.

== Soundtrack ==
Virasat

Soundtrack album by Anu Malik
- Released: April 1997
- Recorded: 1997
- Genre: Hindi Film Music
- Languages: Hindi; Hindustani
- Label: Saregama
- Producer: Anu Malik

Anu Malik chronology
Dil Kitna Nadan Hai (1997)	Virasat (1997)	Border (1997)

The songs featured in the film were composed by Anu Malik, while the lyrics have been penned by Javed Akhtar. Virasat album has 7 songs sung by Jaspinder Narula, Kumar Sanu, Udit Narayan, Hariharan, K. S. Chithra, Abhijeet, Anuradha Sriram, Vinod Rathod, and Kavita Krishnamurthy. Most popular songs in album "Tare Hain Barati", "Payalay Chunmun Chunmun", "Dhol Bajne Laga", etc.

#	Title	Singer(s)
1.	"Payalay Chunmun Chunmun"	Kumar Sanu, K. S. Chithra
2.	"Tare Hain Barati"	Kumar Sanu, Jaspinder Narula
3.	"Jayengi Pi Ke Nagar"	Abhijeet, Anuradha Sriram
4.	"Ek Tha Raja"	Hariharan
5.	"Sun Mausa Sun Mausi"	Vinod Rathod
6.	"Dhol Bajne Laga"	Udit Narayan, Kavita Krishnamurthy
7.	"Payalay Chunmun Chunmun" (Female)	K. S. Chithra

== Accolades ==
Award (Note: Awards, festivals and organizations are in alphabetical order.)	Date of ceremony (Note: Date is linked to the article about the awards held that year, wherever possible.)	Category	Recipient(s)	Result	Ref.
Filmfare Awards	31 January 1998	Best Film	Virasat	Nominated	
Filmfare Awards	31 January 1998	Best Film (Critics)	Virasat	Won	
Filmfare Awards	31 January 1998	Best Director	Priyadarshan	Nominated	
Filmfare Awards	31 January 1998	Best Actor	Anil Kapoor	Nominated	
Filmfare Awards	31 January 1998	Best Actor (Critics)	Anil Kapoor	Won	
Filmfare Awards	31 January 1998	Best Actress	Tabu	Nominated	
Filmfare Awards	31 January 1998	Best Actress (Critics)	Tabu	Won	
Filmfare Awards	31 January 1998	Best Supporting Actor	Amrish Puri	Won	
Filmfare Awards	31 January 1998	Best Supporting Actress	Pooja Batra	Nominated	
Filmfare Awards	31 January 1998	Best Female Debut	Pooja Batra	Nominated	
Filmfare Awards	31 January 1998	Best Villain	Milind Gunaji	Nominated	
Filmfare Awards	31 January 1998	Best Story	Kamal Haasan	Won	
Filmfare Awards	31 January 1998	Best Female Playback Singer	Kavita Krishnamurti for "Dhol Bajne Laga"	Nominated	
Filmfare Awards	31 January 1998	Best Female Playback Singer	K. S. Chithra for "Payalay Chunmun"	Nominated	
Filmfare Awards	31 January 1998	Best Choreography	Farah Khan for "Dhol Bajne Laga"	Won	
National Film Awards	10 July 1998	Best Female Playback Singer	K. S. Chithra for "Payalay Chunmun"	Won	
Screen Awards	17 January 1998	Best Film	Virasat	Nominated	
Screen Awards	17 January 1998	Best Director	Priyadarshan	Nominated	
Screen Awards	17 January 1998	Best Actor	Anil Kapoor	Won	
Screen Awards	17 January 1998	Best Actress	Tabu	Nominated	
Screen Awards	17 January 1998	Best Supporting Actor	Amrish Puri	Won	
Screen Awards	17 January 1998	Best Supporting Actress	Pooja Batra	Nominated	
Screen Awards	17 January 1998	Most Promising Newcomer – Female	Pooja Batra	Nominated	
Screen Awards	17 January 1998	Best Actor in a Negative Role	Milind Gunaji	Nominated	
Screen Awards	17 January 1998	Best Music Director	Anu Malik	Nominated	
Screen Awards	17 January 1998	Best Female Playback Singer	K. S. Chithra for "Payalay Chunmun"	Won	
Screen Awards	17 January 1998	Best Story	Kamal Haasan	Won	
Screen Awards	17 January 1998	Best Screenplay	Kamal Haasan	Nominated	
Screen Awards	17 January 1998	Best Cinematography	Ravi K. Chandran	Nominated	
Screen Awards	17 January 1998	Best Editing	N. Gopala Krishnan	Won	
Screen Awards	17 January 1998	Best Audiographer	Deepan Chatterjee	Won	
Zee Cine Awards	14 March 1998	Best Screenplay	Vinay Shukla	Won	
Zee Cine Awards	14 March 1998	Best Female Debut	Pooja Batra	Nominated	
Zee Cine Awards	14 March 1998	Best Actor in a Supporting Role – Female	Pooja Batra	Nominated	
Zee Cine Awards	14 March 1998	Best Choreography	Farah Khan for "Dhol Bajne Laga"	Nominated	
