= Border 2 (soundtrack) =

2026 soundtrack album by various artists

Border 2 (Original Motion Picture Soundtrack)
- Soundtrack album cover

Soundtrack album by Anu Malik, Mithoon, Sachet–Parampara, Vishal Mishra, and Gurmoh
- Released: 14 January 2026
- Recorded: 2024–2026
- Genres: Motion Picture Soundtrack; Hindi Film Music
- Length: 50:53
- Languages: Hindi; Hindustani
- Label: T-Series
- Producers: Mithoon; Sachet–Parampara; Vishal Mishra; Gurmoh

Mithoon chronology
Saiyaara (2025)	Border 2 (Original Motion Picture Soundtrack) (2026)	Ikka (2026)
External audio
- Border 2 (Full Album) on YouTube

Singles from Border 2
- 1. "Ghar Kab Aaoge" Released: 2 January 2026; 2. "Ishq Da Chehra" Released: 9 January 2026; 3. "Jaate Hue Lamhon" Released: 12 January 2026; 4. "Border" Released: 14 January 2026; 5. "Hindustan Meri Jaan" Released: 14 January 2026; 6. "Tara Rum Pum Pum" Released: 14 January 2026; 7. "Mitti Ke Bete" Released: 14 January 2026

Border 2 (Original Motion Picture Soundtrack) is the soundtrack album to the 2026 Hindi-language epic action war film Border 2, directed by Anurag Singh. A standalone sequel to J. P. Dutta’s Border (1997), the film features Sunny Deol in the leading role, alongside an ensemble cast including Varun Dhawan, Diljit Dosanjh, and Ahan Shetty.

The nine-song soundtrack features contributions from composers Anu Malik, Mithoon, Sachet–Parampara, Vishal Mishra, and Gurmoh, alongside lyricists Javed Akhtar, Manoj Muntashir, Kausar Munir, Kumaar and Anurag Singh himself. Mithoon recreated four songs from the first film for the sequel. Led by three singles, the soundtrack was released via T-Series on 14 January 2026.

== Background ==
In early 2013, Anu Malik in an interview to Devesh Sharma of Filmfare noted that he would also return to Border 2, after Dutta initiated talks for the sequel. But it did not happen. The soundtrack to the film featured songs composed by Anu Malik, Mithoon, Sachet–Parampara, Vishal Mishra and Gurmoh, with lyrics written by Javed Akhtar, Manoj Muntashir, Kausar Munir, Kumaar and Singh himself. John Stewart Eduri composed the film's background score.

The songs "Sandese Aate Hai", "To Chalun", "Hindustan Hindustan", and "Hamen Jab Se Mohabbat" were remixed by Mithoon as "Ghar Kab Aaoge", "Jaate Hue Lamhon", "Hindustan Meri Jaan", and "Mohabbat Ho Gayi Hai" with additional lyrics contributed by Muntashir.

== Release ==
"Ghar Kab Aaoge" was the lead single from the album. It was launched on 2 January 2026, at Tanot near the Longewala border in Jaisalmer, with the cast and crew releasing the song along with the presence of BSF soldiers and their families. "Ishq Da Chehra" was released as the second single on 9 January. The third single "Jaate Hue Lamhon" was launched at the United Services Club in Navy Nagar, Mumbai, with the cast and crew alongside the naval officers in India. The film's music album was launched on 14 January 2026 aboard the INS Kadamba navy base located near Karwar, Karnataka. The cast and crew launched the film's music and trailer along with the naval officers.

== Reception ==
Alakshendra Singh of The Indian Express called the album "entertaining but hardly original" pointing out the lack of freshness and riding on the nostalgia as it works from the business point of view, he added "the best this album can achieve is make you want to listen to the original one". Critic based at Bollywood Hungama called the album as "highlight" with "Ghar Kab Aaoge" as the best song from the album. Vineeta Kumar of India Today considered the music to be one of the biggest shortcomings, as "the new soundtrack fails to leave a lasting impression" and the entire emotional recall comes from the 1997 album.

Archika Khurana of The Times of India noted that the album "strikes the right emotional notes" and the song "Ghar Kab Aaoge" "feels poised to become a lasting patriotic anthem, evoking nostalgia every time it plays". Anuj Kumar of The Hindu wrote "It's the music that makes you ignore the imperfections and lack of originality". Grace Cyril of News18 admitted that the music did much of the emotional heavylifting, with the recreated songs "Ghar Kab Aaoge" and "Jaate Hue Lamhon".

Shortly after the announcement of "Sandese Aate Hai" being recreated as "Ghar Kab Aaoge" for the film, there were speculations that Anu Malik had demanded credits for the original compositions. However, two days later, Malik in his Instagram story had mentioned that Bhushan Kumar had provided him due credits and he stood by this collaboration, which he considered unique and genuinely proud of, squashing the earlier misinformations.

Javed Akhtar, who wrote the lyrics for the predecessor had denied working on the sequel, owing to his critique against remixes and recreated works as an "intellectual and creative bankruptcy". Sonu Nigam also defended Akhtar's stance against recreated works but had denoted the significance of "Sandese Aate Hain" tying the emotional core for both the films. Unlike Akhtar, Nigam had contributed one song for the sequel, "Mitti Ke Bete".

== Track listing ==
No.	Title	Lyrics	Music	Singer(s)	Length
1.	"Ghar Kab Aaoge"	Javed Akhtar, Manoj Muntashir (additional)	Anu Malik, Mithoon (recreation)	Sonu Nigam, Roop Kumar Rathod, Arijit Singh, Diljit Dosanjh, Vishal Mishra	10:34
2.	"Ishq Da Chehra"	Kausar Munir	Sachet–Parampara	Diljit Dosanjh, Parampara Tandon, Sachet Tandon	4:18
3.	"Jaate Hue Lamhon"	Javed Akhtar	Anu Malik, Mithoon (recreation)	Roop Kumar Rathod, Vishal Mishra	5:44
4.	"Pyaari Lage"	Manoj Muntashir	Vishal Mishra	Vishal Mishra, Tulsi Kumar	4:53
5.	"Mohabbat Ho Gayi Hai"	Javed Akhtar, Manoj Muntashir (additional)	Anu Malik, Mithoon (recreation)	Sonu Nigam, Palak Muchhal	6:00
6.	"Tara Rum Pum Pum"	Kumaar	Mithoon	Sukhwinder Singh	4:34
7.	"Hindustan Meri Jaan"	Javed Akhtar, Manoj Muntashir (additional)	Anu Malik, Mithoon (recreation)	B Praak, Mohit Chauhan	3:54
8.	"Border"	Anurag Singh	Gurmoh	B Praak	3:28
9.	"Mitti Ke Bete"	Manoj Muntashir	Mithoon	Sonu Nigam	7:28
Total length:					50:53

== Music credits ==
Credits adapted from T-Series:

- Songs’ composers: Mithoon, Sachet–Parampara, Vishal Mishra, Gurmoh
- Original songs’ composer: Anu Malik
- Lyricists: Javed Akhtar, Manoj Muntashir, Kausar Munir, Kumaar, Anurag Singh
- Original lyricist: Javed Akhtar
- Singers: Sonu Nigam, Roop Kumar Rathod, Arijit Singh, Diljit Dosanjh, Sukhwinder Singh, Vishal Mishra, B Praak, Parampara Tandon, Sachet Tandon, Mohit Chauhan, Palak Muchhal, Tulsi Kumar
- Background score composer: John Stewart Eduri
- Creative head: Anugrah
- Music production: Godswill Mergulhäo, Swapnil Tare, Prasanna Suresh, Nikhil Tare, Vishal Mishra, Gaurav Vaswani
- Music assistance: Anugrah, Godswill Mergulhäo, Eli Rodrigues, Kaushal Gohil
- Guitars: Kalyan Baruah, Bibhash Paban Buragohain, Shomu Seal, Kandarpa Kalita
- Slide guitar: Nikhil Tare
- Bass guitar: Keith Peters
- Bass: Deepu Saikia
- Banjo: Kishor Mohite
- Flute: Rakesh Chaurasia, Flutepreet
- Violin: Jeetu Thakur
- Clarinet: Tapas Roy, Chintoo Singh Wasir
- Sitar : Arshad Khan
- Cello: Bhagirath Bhatt, Gaurav Nagor, Aparna Deodhar, Parth Patel
- Shehnai: Durgesh Bhosle
- Dholak: Swaranjay Dhumal, Ishteyaq Khan, Mushtaq Khan, Omkar Ingavle
- Oud: Sandeep Singh
- Tabla: Prashant Sonagra, Rahul Kathak
- Percussion: Pratap Rath
- Indian rhythm ensemble: Raju Kulkarni, Satyajit Jamsandekar, Naeem Sayyed, Rahul Rupwate, Surinder Belbansi, Tejas Satardekar, Runal Sawant, Varad Kulkarni, Anugrah, Godswill Mergulhäo, Eli Rodrigues, Kaushal Gohil
- Rhythm design, production and programming: Bobby Srivastava
- Rhythm arrangements and conducting: Prashant Sonagra, Swaranjay Dhumal
- Brass ensemble: Robin Fargose, Walter Dias, Blasco Monsorate, Zameeruddin Shaikh, I. D. Rao.
- Choir co-ordinator: Shripad Lele
- Choir: Shripad Lele, Umesh Joshi, Vivek Naik, Vijay Dhuri, Anil Bhilare, Janardan Dhatrak, Dattatray Mestry, Siddhant Karawde, Mangesh Shirke, Latesh Pujari, Sagar Kudalkar, Mohan Morajkar, Karan Kagale, Vaibhav Sutar, Vishal Jagtap, Pratap Kalke, Mohan Shravan, Gaurav Dandekar, Prasad Manjrekar, Vishal Tambe, Unmesh Chandavarkar, Shashank Mohite, Siddharth Joshi, Keshab Baruah, Vidit Patankar, Smit Vaidya, Chaitanya Shinde, Ekagra Upadhyay, Tanuj Manchanda, Dipanshu Tiwari, Abhishek Sharma, Nitin Karandikar, Nishad Joshi, Munawwar Ali, Rinku, Sahil Inaam, Deepak Malhotra, Mohammed Azharuddin, Santosh Bote, Kishor Mohite, Kaustubh Patil, Puran Shiva, Yashad Ghanekar, Devendra Chitni, Rishikesh Patil, Shardul Kavthekar, Pranav Haridas, Kartik Lele, Mayuresh Madgavkar, Abhijit Ketkar, Amit Dandekar, Sangam Upadhyay, Aryaman Chitnis, Chinmay Mohite, Rohan Patil, Mandar Sabnis, Mangesh Ghanekar, Parth Mahajan, Vivek Chavan, Adyot Saigaonkar, Ram More, Shardul Naik, Vinayak Vatve, Pranav Dehrekar, Prasenjeet Waghmare, Rakesh Singh, Santosh Salve
- Classical choir: Divyesh Jaipurwale, Ashish Kathak, Sandeep Jaiswal, Fazal Abbas Jafri, Rahul Verma, Sachin More
- Backing vocals: Kumar Gaurav Singh, Amrita Talukder, Kanchhan Srivas, June Das
- Additional vocals: Abhishek Nailwal, Mohd Danish
- Recording studios: YRF Studios, Mumbai; Living Water Studios, Mumbai; Studio 504, Mumbai; Headroom Studios, Mumbai; The Mix Mill, Mumbai; VM Studio, Mumbai
- Recording engineers: Vijay Dayal, Abhishek Khandelwal, A Manivannan, Rahul M Sharma, Aftab Khan, Rupjit Das, Trihangku Lahkar
- Recording assistance: Sagar Sathe, Dileep Nair
- Mixing and mastering studios: Future Sound of Bombay, Mumbai; Headroom Studios, Mumbai; New Edge Studios, Mumbai; YRF Studios, Mumbai
- Mixing and mastering engineers: Eric Pillai, Aftab Khan, Shadab Rayeen, Vijay Dayal
- Mixing and mastering assistance: Michael Edwin Pillai,
- Musical assistance: Priyank Tayal, Kumar Gaurav Singh, Trihangku Lahkar, Bitupon Boruah
- Mithoon's manager: Vijay Iyer
- Mithoon's staff: Ganesh Raut, Sanjeev Utekar, Sagar Akhade
