= 43rd Filmfare Awards =

1998 awards for Hindi cinema

- Date: 31 January 1998
- Site: Mumbai, India

Highlights
- Best Film: Dil To Pagal Hai
- Critics Award for Best Film: Virasat
- Most awards: Dil To Pagal Hai (8)
- Most nominations: Virasat (16)

The 43rd Filmfare Awards were held on 31 January 1998, in Mumbai, India.

Virasat led the ceremony with 16 nominations, followed by Pardes and Border with 12 nominations each and Dil To Pagal Hai with 11 nominations.

Yash Chopra's Dil To Pagal Hai won 8 awards, including Best Film, Best Actor (for Shah Rukh Khan), Best Actress (for Madhuri Dixit) and Best Supporting Actress (for Karisma Kapoor), thus becoming the most–awarded film at the ceremony.

Shah Rukh Khan received dual nominations for Best Actor for his performances in Dil To Pagal Hai and Yes Boss, winning for the former.

Kajol became the first actress to win Best Villain, winning the award for Rajiv Rai's Gupt.

== Awards ==
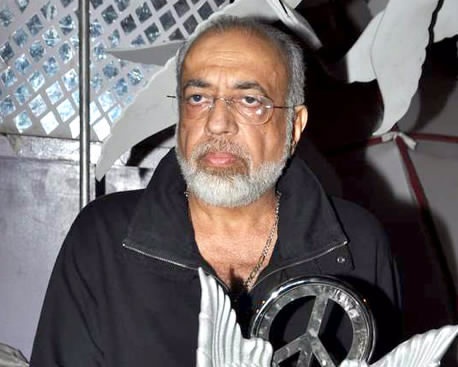
J. P. Dutta — Best Director winner for Border

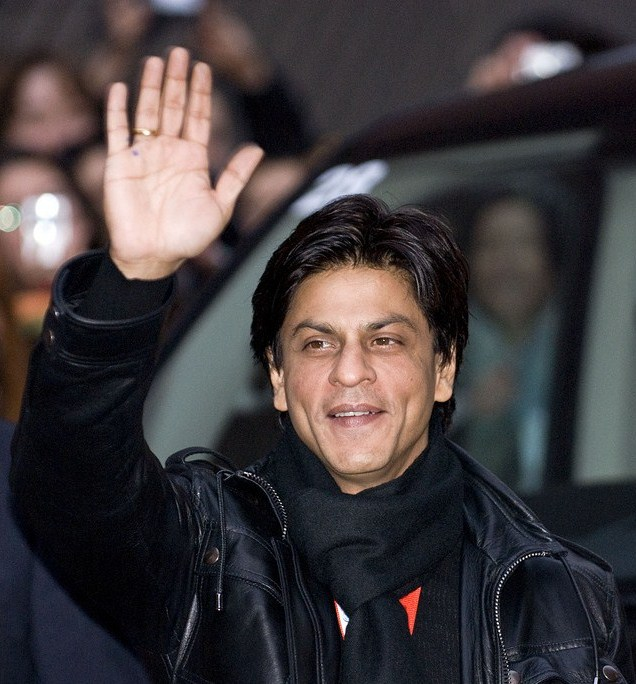
Shah Rukh Khan — Best Actor winner for Dil To Pagal Hai

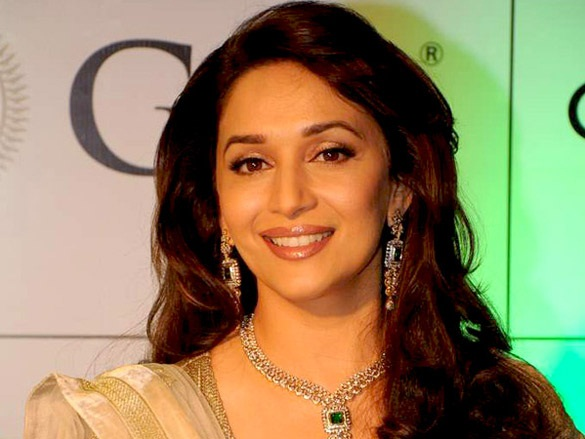
Madhuri Dixit — Best Actress winner for Dil To Pagal Hai

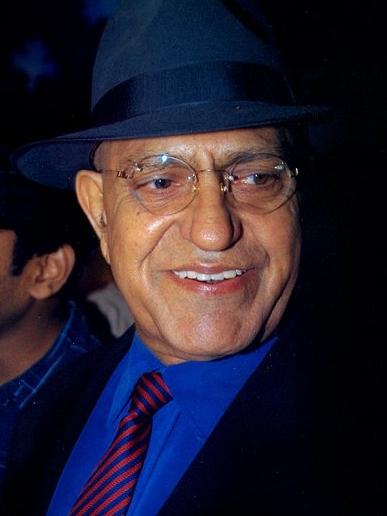
Amrish Puri — Best Supporting Actor winner for Virasat

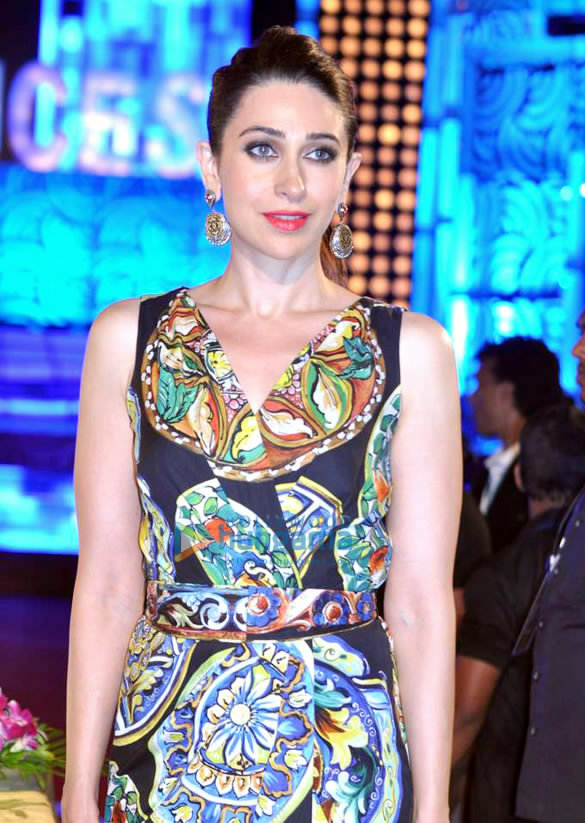
Karisma Kapoor — Best Supporting Actress winner for Dil To Pagal Hai

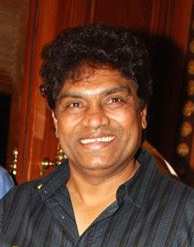
Johnny Lever — Best Performance in a Comic Role winner for Deewana Mastana

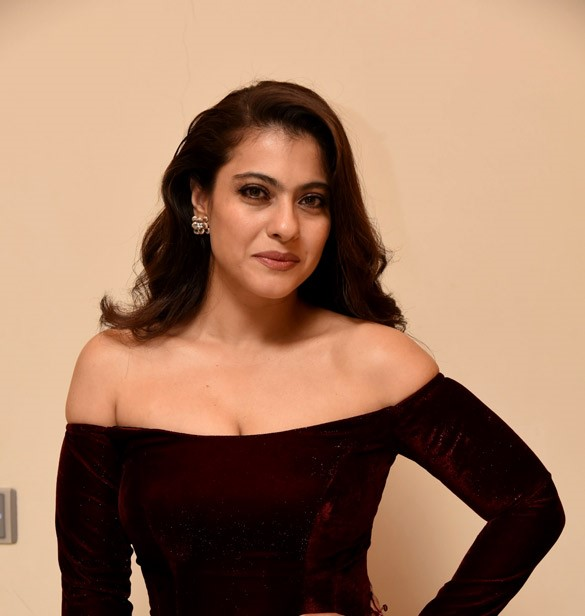
Kajol — Best Performance in a Negative Role winner for Gupt: The Hidden Truth

The winners and nominees for all categories are listed below. The winners are listed first, highlighted in boldface, and indicated with a double dagger (‡).

=== Popular Awards ===
Best Film	Best Director
**Dil To Pagal Hai**; Border; Gupt; Pardes; Virasat	**J. P. Dutta – Border**; Priyadarshan – Virasat; Rajiv Rai – Gupt; Subhash Ghai – Pardes; Yash Chopra – Dil To Pagal Hai
Best Actor	Best Actress
**Shah Rukh Khan – Dil To Pagal Hai**; Anil Kapoor – Virasat; Govinda – Deewana Mastana; Sunny Deol - Border; Kamal Haasan – Chachi 420; Shah Rukh Khan – Yes Boss	**Madhuri Dixit – Dil To Pagal Hai**; Juhi Chawla – Yes Boss; Mahima Chaudhry – Pardes; Sridevi – Judaai; Tabu – Virasat
Best Supporting Actor	Best Supporting Actress
**Amrish Puri – Virasat**; Akshay Kumar – Dil To Pagal Hai; Akshaye Khanna – Border; Om Puri – Gupt; Sunil Shetty – Border	**Karishma Kapoor – Dil To Pagal Hai**; Aruna Irani – Ghulam–E–Mustafa; Pooja Batra – Virasat; Raakhee – Border; Urmila Matondkar – Judaai
Best Performance in a Negative Role	Best Performance in a Comic Role
**Kajol – Gupt**; Aditya Pancholi – Yes Boss; Amrish Puri – Koyla; Milind Gunaji – Virasat; Sadashiv Amrapurkar – Ishq	**Johnny Lever – Deewana Mastana**; Johnny Lever – Judaai; Om Puri – Chachi 420; Paresh Rawal – Chachi 420; Shakti Kapoor – Judwaa
Best Male Debut	Best Female Debut
**Akshaye Khanna – Border**; Arif Zakaria – Darmiyaan	**Mahima Chaudhry – Pardes**; Aishwarya Rai – Aur Pyaar Ho Gaya; Pooja Batra – Virasat
Best Music Director	Best Lyricist
**Dil To Pagal Hai – Uttam Singh**; Border – Anu Malik; Gupt – Viju Shah; Pardes – Nadeem–Shravan; Yes Boss – Jatin–Lalit	**Border – Javed Akhtar for Sandese Aate Hai**; Dil To Pagal Hai – Anand Bakshi for Bholi Si Surat; Pardes – Anand Bakshi for I Love My India; Pardes – Anand Bakshi for Meri Mehbooba; Yes Boss – Javed Akhtar for Chaand Taare
Best Male Playback Singer	Best Female Playback Singer
**Yes Boss – Abhijeet for Main Koi Aisa Geet Gaaun**; Border – Sonu Nigam and Roop Kumar Rathod for Sandese Aate Hai; Dil To Pagal Hai – Udit Narayan for Dil To Pagal Hai; Pardes – Kumar Sanu for Do Dil Mil Rahe Hain; Pardes – Hariharan for I Love My India	**Pardes – Alka Yagnik for Meri Mehbooba**; Gupt – Alka Yagnik for Mere Khwabon Mein Tu; Pardes – Kavita Krishnamurthy for I Love My India; Virasat – Kavita Krishnamurthy for Dhol Bajne Laga; Virasat – K.S. Chithra for Payalein Chun Mun

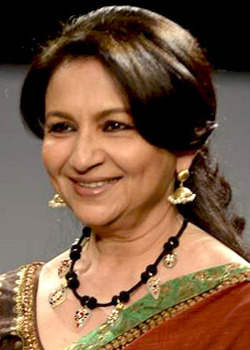
Sharmila Tagore — Lifetime Achievement Awardee

=== Special awards ===
Lifetime Achievement Award
Sharmila Tagore
Special Award
Jaya Bachchan
R. D. Burman Award
Karthik Raja

=== Critics' awards ===
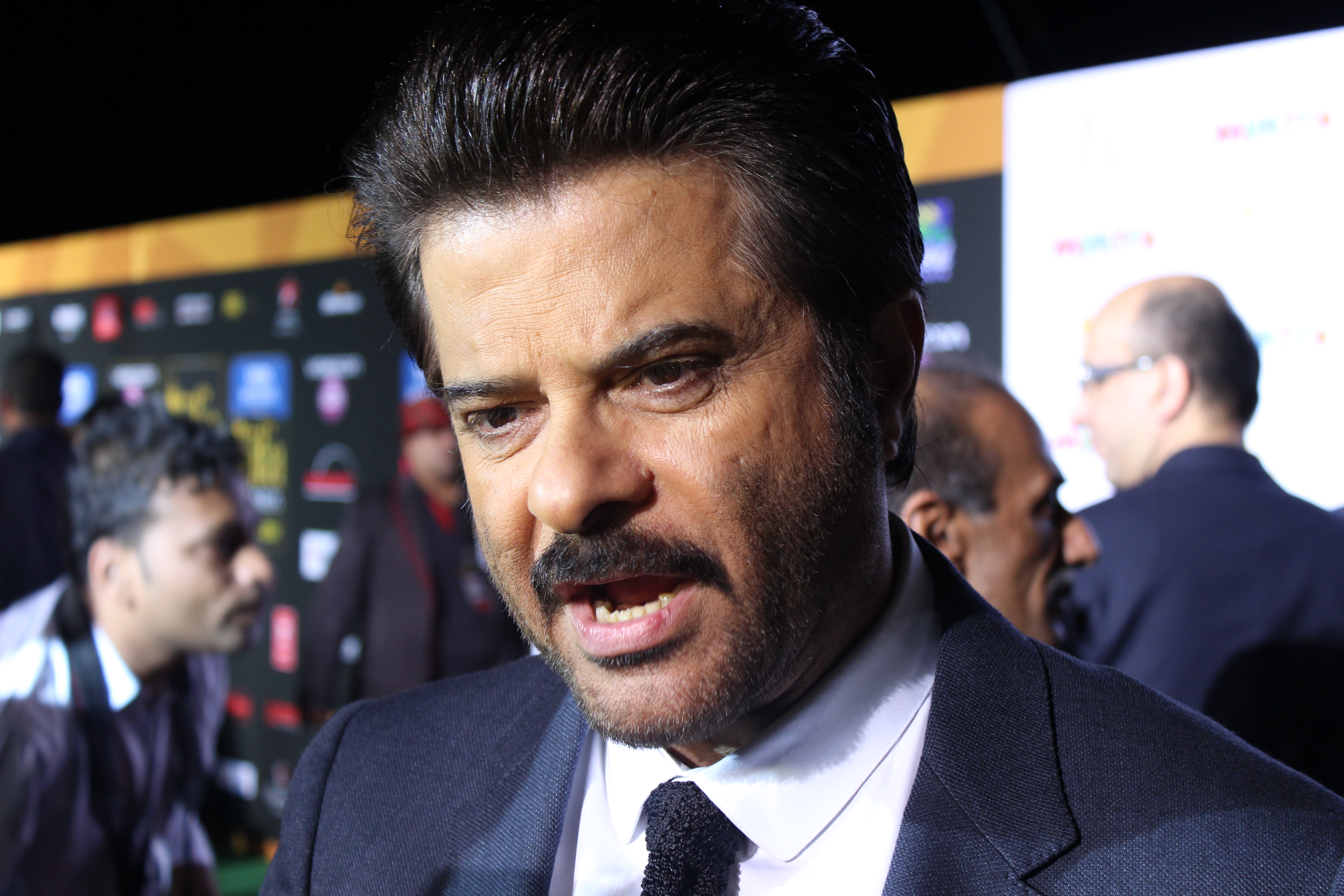
Anil Kapoor — Best Actor Critics winner for Virasat

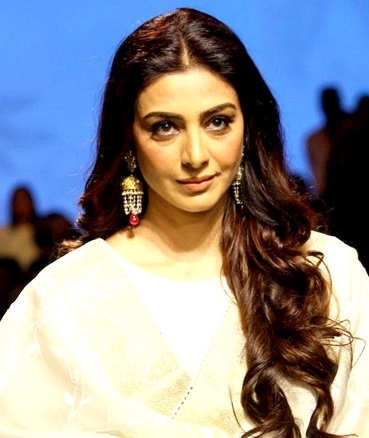
Tabu — Best Actress Critics winner for Virasat

Best Film (Best Director)
**Virasat**
Best Actor	Best Actress
**Anil Kapoor – Virasat**	**Tabu – Virasat**

== Biggest winners ==
- Dil To Pagal Hai – 8/11
- Virasat – 7/16
- Border – 5/12
- Gupt – 3/8
- Pardes – 3/12

== See also ==
- 42nd Filmfare Awards
- Filmfare Awards
