= Zee Cine Award for Best Playback Singer – Male =

Film award in India

Zee Cine Awards for Best Male Playback Singer
- Awarded for: Best Performance by a Male Playback Singer
- Country: India
- Presented by: Zee
- First award: Sonu Nigam, "Sandese Aate Hai"; Border (1998)
- Currently held by: Faheem Abdullah, "Saiyaara"; Saiyaara (2026)

The Zee Cine Award Best Playback Singer - Male is chosen by the jury of Zee Entertainment Enterprises as part of its annual award ceremony for Hindi films, to recognise a male playback singer. Following its inception in 1998, no ceremony was held in 2009 and 2010, but the ceremony resumed in 2011.

== Superlatives ==
Superlative	Singer	Record
Most awards	Arijit Singh	7
Most nominations	Arijit Singh	16
Most nominations without ever winning	Shafqat Amanat Ali	4
Most nominations in a single year	Arijit Singh	3 (2016, 2018)
Most consecutive awards	Arijit Singh	3 (2014, 2016, 2017) & 4 (2019, 2023, 2024, 2025)
Most consecutive nominations	Arijit Singh	16 (2014-2025)
Oldest winner	Udit Narayan	45 (2000)
Youngest winner	Sonu Nigam	25 (1998)

=== Most Wins ===
Winner	Number of Wins	Years
Arijit Singh	7	2014, 2016, 2017, 2020, 2023, 2024, 2025
Sonu Nigam	4	1998, 2002, 2003, 2013
Shaan; Mohit Chauhan	3	2004, 2007, 2008; 2011, 2012, 2016

== List of Nominees and Winners ==
=== 1990s ===
Year	Singer	Song	Movie
1998
1998	Sonu Nigam	Sandese Aate Hai	Border
1998	Kumar Sanu	Do Dil Mil Rahe Hain	Pardes
1998	Udit Narayan	Dil To Pagal Hai	Dil To Pagal Hai
1999
1999	Sukhwinder Singh	Chaiyya Chaiyya	Dil Se..
1999	Udit Narayan	Kuch Kuch Hota Hai	Kuch Kuch Hota Hai
1999	Udit Narayan	Ae Ajnabi	Dil Se..
1999	Aamir Khan	Aati Kya Khandala	Ghulam
1999	Kamaal Khan	O O Jaane Jaana	Pyaar Kiya To Darna Kya

=== 2000s ===
Year	Singer	Song	Movie
2000
2000	Udit Narayan	Chand Chupa Badal Mein	Hum Dil De Chuke Sanam
2000	Udit Narayan	Taal Se Taal	Taal
2000	Sonu Nigam, A.R. Rahman	Ishq Bina	Taal
2000	Abhijeet	Biwi No.1	Biwi No.1
2000	Roop Kumar Rathod, Sonu Nigam	Zindagi Maut Na Ban Jaye	Sarfarosh
2001
2001	Lucky Ali	Na Tum Jaano	Kaho Naa... Pyaar Hai
2001	Abhijeet Bhattacharya	Tum Dil Ki Dhadkan Mein	Dhadkan
2001	Sonu Nigam	Panchi Nadiya Pawan Ke	Refugee
2001	Udit Narayan	Humko Humise Chura Lo	Mohabbatein
2001	Udit Narayan, Kumar Sanu	Dil Ne Yeh Kaha Hain Dil Se	Dhadkan
2002
2002	Sonu Nigam	Suraj Hua Maddham	Kabhi Khushi Kabhie Gham
2002	Abhijeet Bhattacharya	Roshni Se	Aśoka
2002	Shankar Mahadevan	Dil Chahta Hai	Dil Chahta Hai
2002	Sonu Nigam	Tanhayee	Dil Chahta Hai
2002	Udit Narayan	Mitwa	Lagaan
2003
2003	Sonu Nigam	Saathiya	Saathiya
2003	Shaan	Nikamma Kiya Is Dil Ne	Kyaa Dil Ne Kahaa
2003	Sonu Nigam, Manmohan Waris	Mere Rang De Basanti	The Legend Of Bhagat Singh
2003	Sukhwinder Singh, A. R. Rahman	Des Mere Des	The Legend Of Bhagat Singh
2003	Abhijeet Bhattacharya	Aap Mujhe Achche Lagne Lage	Aap Mujhe Achche Lagne Lage
2004
2004	Shaan	Suno Na	Jhankaar Beats
2004	Abhijeet Bhattacharya	Tauba Tumhare Yeh Ishaare	Chalte Chalte
2004	Sonu Nigam	Kal Ho Naa Ho	Kal Ho Naa Ho
2004	Sudesh Bhosale	Meri Makhna	Baghban
2004	Udit Narayan	Tere Naam	Tere Naam
2005
2005	Kunal Ganjawala	Bheege Hont Tere	Murder
2005	A. R. Rahman	Yeh Jo Des Hai Tera	Swades
2005	Udit Narayan	Main Yahaan H	Veer-Zaara
2005	Arnab Chakravorty	Wada Raha (I)	Khakee
2005	Sonu Nigam	Main Hoon Na	Main Hoon Na
2006
2006	Himesh Reshammiya	Aashiq Banaya Aapne	Aashiq Banaya Aapne
2006	Sonu Nigam	Dheere Jalna	Paheli
2006	Sonu Nigam	Piyu Bole	Parineeta
2006	KK, Shaan	Dus Bahane	Dus
2006	Atif Aslam	Woh Lamhe	Zeher
2006	Rahat Fateh Ali Khan	Jiya Dhadak Dhadak Jaye	Kalyug
2007
2007	Shaan	Chand Sifarish	Fanaa
2007	KK	Tu Hi Meri Shab Hai	Gangster
2007	Shafqat Amanat Ali	Mitwa	Kabhi Alvida Naa Kehna
2007	Sonu Nigam	Kabhi Alvida Naa Kehna	Kabhi Alvida Naa Kehna
2007	Zubeen Garg	Ya Ali	Gangster
2008
2008	Shaan	Jab Se Tere Naina	Saawariya
2008	Sonu Nigam	Main Agar Kahoon	Om Shanti Om
2008	KK	Ajab Si	Om Shanti Om
2008	Soham Chakrabarty	In Dino	Life in a... Metro
2008	Sukhwinder Singh, Salim–Sulaiman, Marianne D'Cruz	Chak De! India	Chak De! India
2009	NO CEREMONY		

=== 2010s ===
Year	Singer	Song	Movie
2010	NO CEREMONY		
2011
2011	Mohit Chauhan	Pee Loon	Once Upon a Time in Mumbaai
2011	Daler Mehndi	Zor Ka Jhatka	Action Replayy
2011	Rahat Fateh Ali Khan	Tere Mast	Dabangg
2011	Shafqat Amanat Ali	Bin Tere	I Hate Luv Storys
2011	Shafqat Amanat Ali	Tere Naina	My Name Is Khan
2011	Sonu Nigam	Tees Maar Khan	Tees Maar Khan
2012
2012	Mohit Chauhan	Jo Bhi Main	Rockstar
2012	Akon	Chammak Challo	Ra.One
2012	Bappi Lahiri	Oh La La	The Dirty Picture
2012	Mika Singh	Dhinka Chika	Ready
2012	Mohit Chauhan	Sadda Haq	Rockstar
2012	Shafqat Amanat Ali	Dildaara	Ra.One
2013
2013	Sonu Nigam	Abhi Mujh Mein Kahin	Agneepath
2013	Javed Ali	Ishaqzaade	Ishaqzaade
2013	Mika Singh & Wajid Khan	Chinta Ta Ta Chita Chita	Rowdy Rathore
2013	Mohit Chauhan	Ala Barfi	Barfi!
2013	Rabbi Shergill	Challa	Jab Tak Hai Jaan
2013	Shafqat Amanat Ali	Tu Hi Mera	Jannat 2
2014
2014	Arijit Singh	Tum Hi Ho	Aashiqui 2
2014	Amitabh Bhattacharya	Tera Rastaa Chhodoon Na	Chennai Express
2014	Atif Aslam	Jeene Laga Hoon	Ramaiya Vastavaiya
2014	Siddharth Mahadevan	Zinda	Bhaag Milkha Bhaag
2014	Benny Dayal	Badtameez Dil	Yeh Jawaani Hai Deewani
2014	Yo Yo Honey Singh	Lungi Dance	Chennai Express
2015
2015	Arijit Singh	Muskurane	CityLights
2015	Yo Yo Honey Singh	Sunny Sunny	Yaariyan
2015	Ankit Tiwari	Gaaliyan	Ek Villain
2015	KK	India Waale	Happy New Year
2015	Manj Musik	Whistle Baja	Heropanti
2016
2016	Arijit Singh	Sooraj Dooba Hain	Roy
2016	Mohit Chauhan	Matargashti	Tamasha
2016	Arijit Singh	Gerua	Dilwale
2016	Papon	Moh Moh Ke Dhaage	Dum Laga Ke Haisha
2016	Vishal Dadlani	Malhari	Bajirao Mastani
2017
2017	Arijit Singh	Ae Dil Hai Mushkil	Ae Dil Hai Mushkil
2017	Arijit Singh	Alizeh	Ae Dil Hai Mushkil
2017	Arijit Singh	Channa Mereya	Ae Dil Hai Mushkil
2017	Amit Mishra	Bulleya	Ae Dil Hai Mushkil
2017	Rahat Fateh Ali Khan	Jag Ghoomeya	Sultan
2017	Sukhwinder Singh	Sultan	Sultan
2018
2018	Akhil Sachdeva	Humsafar	Badrinath Ki Dulhania
2018	Arijit Singh	Hawayein	Jab Harry Met Sejal
2018	Arijit Singh	Phir Bhi Tumko Chaahunga	Half Girlfriend
2018	Arijit Singh	Zaalima	Raees
2018	Ash King	Baarish	Half Girlfriend
2018	Arko Pravo Mukherjee	Nazm Nazm	Bareilly Ki Barfi
2019
2019	Yaseer Desai	Naino Ne Baandhi	Gold
2019	Arijit Singh	Ae Watan	Raazi
2019	Abhay Jodhpurkar	Mere Naam Tu	Zero
2019	Ajay Gogavale	Dhadak	Dhadak
2019	Darshan Raval	Chogada	Loveyatri
2019	Sukhwinder Singh	Kar Har Maidaan Fateh	Sanju

=== 2020s ===
Year	Singer	Song	Movie
2020
2020	Arijit Singh	Kalank	Kalank
2020	Arijit Singh	Ve Maahi	Kesari
2020	B Praak	Teri Mitti	Kesari
2020	Nakash Aziz	Slow Motion	Bharat
2020	Sachet Tandon	Bekhayali	Kabir Singh
2020	Vishal Mishra	Kaise Hua	Kabir Singh
2021	NO CEREMONY		
2022	NO CEREMONY		
2023
2023	Arijit Singh	Kesariya	Brahmāstra: Part One – Shiva
2023	Sachet Tandon	"Maiyya Mainu"	Jersey
2023	Sonu Nigam	"Main Ki Karaan"	Laal Singh Chaddha
2023	Mohan Kannan	"Kahani"	Laal Singh Chaddha
2023	Arijit Singh	"Apna Bana Le"	Bhediya
2023	Nihal Tauro	"Tere Saath Hoon Main"	Raksha Bandhan
2024
2024	Arijit Singh	Jhoome Jo Pathaan	Pathaan
2025	Arijit Singh	Sajni	Laapataa Ladies
2026	Faheem Abdhullah	Saiyaara (Title Track)	Saiyaara

== See also ==
- Zee Cine Awards
- Bollywood
- Cinema of India
