= Zee Cine Award for Best Actor – Male =

Indian film award

Zee Cine Award for Best Actor (Popular)
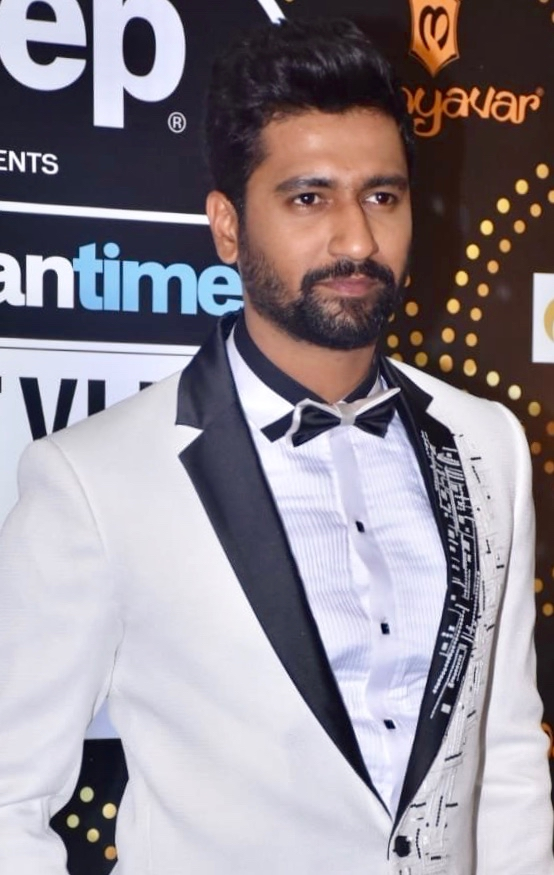
- The 2026 recipient: Vicky Kaushal
- Type: Viewers' Choice
- Awarded for: Best Performance by an Actor in a Leading Role
- Date: 1 March 2026
- Venue: Sardar Vallabhbhai Patel Indoor Stadium
- Country: India
- Presented by: Zee Entertainment Enterprises
- First award: Shah Rukh Khan, Dil To Pagal Hai (1998)
- Currently held by: Vicky Kaushal; Chhaava (2026)
- Website: zeecineawards.com

The Zee Cine Award for Best Actor – Male is chosen by the viewers of Zee Entertainment Enterprises as part of its annual award ceremony for Hindi films, to recognise a male actor who has delivered an outstanding performance in a leading role. Following its inception in 1998, a ceremony was not held in 2009 and 2010, but resumed back in 2011. Shah Rukh Khan, with eight awards holds the record of the maximum wins in this category.

† - indicates the performance also won the Filmfare Award
‡ - indicates the performance was also nominated for the Filmfare Award

== Superlatives ==
| Superlative | Actor | Record |
|---|---|---|
| Actor with most consecutive year nominations | Shah Rukh Khan (1998-2014) | 15 |
| Actor with most awards | Shah Rukh Khan | 8 |
| Actor with most nominations | Shah Rukh Khan | 22 |
| Actor with most nominations without ever winning | Ajay Devgn | 9 |
| Actor with most nominations in a single year | Shah Rukh Khan (2005) | 3 |
| Eldest Winner | Anupam Kher (2023) | 68 |
| Youngest Winner | Hrithik Roshan (2001) | 26 |
| Eldest Nominee | Amitabh Bachchan (2017) | 74 |
| Youngest Nominee | Hrithik Roshan (2001); Vivek Oberoi (2003) | 26 |

== Multiple wins ==
- 7 wins : Shah Rukh Khan
- 3 wins : Hrithik Roshan, Salman Khan
- 2 wins : Aamir Khan

== List of winners and nominees ==
=== 1990s ===
| Year | Actor | Film | Character |
|---|---|---|---|
1998
| 1998 | Shah Rukh Khan † | Dil To Pagal Hai | Rahul |
| 1998 | Aamir Khan | Ishq | Raja |
| 1998 | Kamal Haasan ‡ | Chachi 420 | Jaiprakash Paswan / Lakshmi Godbole |
| 1998 | Shah Rukh Khan | Pardes | Arjun Sagar |
| 1998 | Sunny Deol ‡ | Border | Major Kuldip Singh Chandpuri |
1999
| 1999 | Shah Rukh Khan † | Kuch Kuch Hota Hai | Rahul Khanna |
| 1999 | Aamir Khan ‡ | Ghulam | Siddharth "Siddhu" Marathe |
| 1999 | Salman Khan | Jab Pyaar Kisise Hota Hai | Suraj Dhanrajgir |
| 1999 | Salman Khan ‡ | Pyaar Kiya To Darna Kya | Suraj Khanna |
| 1999 | Shah Rukh Khan | Duplicate | Bablu Chaudhary / Manu Dada |

=== 2000s ===
| Year | Actor | Film | Character |
|---|---|---|---|
2000
| 2000 | Aamir Khan ‡ | Sarfarosh | A.C.P. Ajay Singh Rathod |
| 2000 | Ajay Devgan ‡ | Hum Dil De Chuke Sanam | Vanraj |
| 2000 | Salman Khan | Biwi No.1 | Prem |
| 2000 | Salman Khan | Hum Saath Saath Hain | Prem |
| 2000 | Shah Rukh Khan | Baadshah | Baadshah |
2001
| 2001 | Hrithik Roshan † | Kaho Naa... Pyaar Hai | Rohit / Raj Chopra |
| 2001 | Anil Kapoor ‡ | Pukar | Major Jaidev Rajvansh |
| 2001 | Hrithik Roshan ‡ | Fiza | Amaan Ikramullah |
| 2001 | Sanjay Dutt ‡ | Mission Kashmir | SSP Inayat Khan |
| 2001 | Shah Rukh Khan ‡ | Mohabbatein | Raj Aryan Malhotra |
2002
| 2002 | Aamir Khan † | Lagaan | Bhuvan |
| 2002 | Aamir Khan ‡ | Dil Chahta Hai | Akash Malhotra |
| 2002 | Amitabh Bachchan ‡ | Aks | Manu Verma |
| 2002 | Shah Rukh Khan ‡ | Kabhi Khushi Kabhie Gham | Rahul Y. Raichand |
| 2002 | Sunny Deol ‡ | Gadar: Ek Prem Katha | Tara Singh |
2003
| 2003 | Shah Rukh Khan † | Devdas | Devdas Mukherjee |
| 2003 | Ajay Devgan ‡ | Company | Mallik |
| 2003 | Ajay Devgan | The Legend of Bhagat Singh | Bhagat Singh |
| 2003 | Amitabh Bachchan | Aankhen | Vijay Singh Rajput |
| 2003 | Vivek Oberoi ‡ | Saathiya | Aditya Sehgal |
2004
| 2004 | Hrithik Roshan † | Koi... Mil Gaya | Rohit Mehra |
| 2004 | Ajay Devgan ‡ | Gangaajal | Amit Kumar |
| 2004 | Amitabh Bachchan ‡ | Baghban | Raj Malhotra |
| 2004 | Salman Khan ‡ | Tere Naam | Radhe Mohan |
| 2004 | Shah Rukh Khan ‡ | Kal Ho Naa Ho | Aman Mathur |
2005
| 2005 | Shah Rukh Khan ‡ | Veer-Zaara | Veer Pratap Singh |
| 2005 | Amitabh Bachchan ‡ | Khakee | Anant Kumar Shrivastav |
| 2005 | Hrithik Roshan ‡ | Lakshya | Karan Shergill |
| 2005 | Salman Khan | Mujhse Shaadi Karogi | Sameer Malhotra |
| 2005 | Shah Rukh Khan ‡ | Main Hoon Na | Major Ram Prasad Sharma |
| 2005 | Shah Rukh Khan † | Swades | Mohan Bhargav |
2006
| 2006 | Amitabh Bachchan † | Black | Debraj Sahai |
| 2006 | Ajay Devgan | Apaharan | Ajay Shastri |
| 2006 | Akshay Kumar | Waqt: The Race Against Time | Aditya "Adi" Ishwarchand Thakur |
| 2006 | Amitabh Bachchan ‡ | Sarkar | Subhash Nagre (Sarkar) |
| 2006 | Saif Ali Khan ‡ | Parineeta | Shekhar Roy |
| 2006 | Shah Rukh Khan | Paheli | Kishanlal / The Ghost |
2007
| 2007 | Hrithik Roshan ‡ | Krrish | Krishna "Krrish" Mehra |
| 2007 | Aamir Khan ‡ | Rang De Basanti | Daljit "DJ" Singh / Chandra Shekhar Azad |
| 2007 | Ajay Devgan | Omkara | Omkara "Omi" Shukla |
| 2007 | Sanjay Dutt ‡ | Lage Raho Munna Bhai | Murli Prasad Sharma |
| 2007 | Shah Rukh Khan ‡ | Kabhi Alvida Naa Kehna | Dev Saran |
2008
| 2008 | Shah Rukh Khan † | Chak De! India | Coach Kabir Khan |
| 2008 | Abhishek Bachchan ‡ | Guru | Gurukant Desai |
| 2008 | Akshay Kumar ‡ | Namastey London | Arjun Singh |
| 2008 | Amitabh Bachchan | Cheeni Kum | Buddhadev Gupta |
| 2008 | Shahid Kapoor ‡ | Jab We Met | Aditya Kashyap |
| 2008 | Shah Rukh Khan ‡ | Om Shanti Om | Om Prakash Makhija / Om Kapoor |
| 2009 | No award | -- | -- |

=== 2010s ===
| Year | Actor | Film | Character |
|---|---|---|---|
| 2010 | No award | -- | -- |
2011
| 2011 | Shah Rukh Khan † | My Name Is Khan | Rizwan Khan |
| 2011 | Ajay Devgn ‡ | Once Upon a Time in Mumbaai | Sultan Mirza |
| 2011 | Akshay Kumar | Housefull | Aarush Awasti |
| 2011 | Hrithik Roshan ‡ | Guzaarish | Ethan Mascarenhas |
| 2011 | Ranbir Kapoor ‡ | Raajneeti | Samar Pratap |
| 2011 | Salman Khan ‡ | Dabangg | Inspector Chulbul Pandey |
2012
| 2012 | Ranbir Kapoor † | Rockstar | Janardan Jhakhar / Jordan |
| 2012 | Ajay Devgn ‡ | Singham | Bajirao Singham |
| 2012 | Hrithik Roshan ‡ | Zindagi Na Milegi Dobara | Arjun Saluja |
| 2012 | Salman Khan ‡ | Bodyguard | Lovely Singh |
| 2012 | Shah Rukh Khan ‡ | Don 2 | Don |
| 2012 | Shah Rukh Khan | Ra.One | Shekhar Subramanium / G.One |
2013
| 2013 | Salman Khan ‡ | Dabangg 2 | Inspector Chulbul Pandey |
| 2013 | Hrithik Roshan ‡ | Agneepath | Vijay Deenanath Chauhan |
| 2013 | Irrfan Khan ‡ | Paan Singh Tomar | Paan Singh Tomar |
| 2013 | Ranbir Kapoor † | Barfi! | Murphy "Barfi" Johnson |
| 2013 | Shah Rukh Khan ‡ | Jab Tak Hai Jaan | Major Samar Anand |
2014
| 2014 | Shah Rukh Khan ‡ | Chennai Express | Rahul Mithaiwala |
| 2014 | Aamir Khan | Dhoom 3 | Sahir Khan / Samar Khan |
| 2014 | Aditya Roy Kapur | Aashiqui 2 | Rahul Jaykar |
| 2014 | Farhan Akhtar † | Bhaag Milkha Bhaag | Milkha Singh |
| 2014 | Aditya Roy Kapoor ‡ | Yeh Jawaani Hai Deewani | Avinash |
| 2014 | Ranveer Singh ‡ | Goliyon Ki Raasleela Ram-Leela | Ram Rajadi |
| 2015 | No award | -- | -- |
2016
| 2016 | Salman Khan ‡ | Bajrangi Bhaijaan | Pavan Kumar Chaturvedi / Bajrangi Bhaijaan |
| 2016 | Ajay Devgn | Drishyam | Vijay Salgaonkar |
| 2016 | Akshay Kumar | Baby | Ajay Singh Rajput |
| 2016 | Ranbir Kapoor ‡ | Tamasha | Ved Vardhan Sahni |
| 2016 | Ranveer Singh † | Bajirao Mastani | Peshwa Bajirao |
| 2016 | Varun Dhawan ‡ | Badlapur | Raghav "Raghu" Purohit |
2017
| 2017 | Salman Khan ‡ | Sultan | Sultan Ali Khan |
| 2017 | Aamir Khan † | Dangal | Mahavir Singh Phogat |
| 2017 | Akshay Kumar | Airlift | Ranjit Katyal |
| 2017 | Amitabh Bachchan ‡ | Pink | Deepak Sehgal |
| 2017 | Ranbir Kapoor ‡ | Ae Dil Hai Mushkil | Ayan Sanger |
| 2017 | Sushant Singh Rajput ‡ | M.S. Dhoni: The Untold Story | Mahendra Singh Dhoni |
2018
| 2018 | Akshay Kumar | Jolly LLB 2 | Advocate Jagdishwar Mishra |
| 2018 | Akshay Kumar ‡ | Toilet: Ek Prem Katha | Keshav Sharma |
| 2018 | Ayushmann Khurrana ‡ | Shubh Mangal Saavdhan | Mudit Sharma |
| 2018 | Hrithik Roshan ‡ | Kaabil | Rohan Bhatnagar |
| 2018 | Shah Rukh Khan ‡ | Raees | Raees |
| 2018 | Varun Dhawan | Judwaa 2 | Prem/Raja |
2019
| 2019 | Ranveer Singh ‡ | Padmaavat | Alauddin Khilji |
| 2019 | Ayushmann Khurrana ‡ | Andhadhun | Akash |
| 2019 | Kartik Aaryan | Sonu Ke Titu Ki Sweety | Sonu Sharma |
| 2019 | Ranbir Kapoor † | Sanju | Sanjay Dutt |
| 2019 | Ranveer Singh | Simmba | Sangram "Simmba" Bhalerao |
| 2019 | Varun Dhawan | Sui Dhaaga | Mauji Sharma |

=== 2020s ===
| Year | Actor | Film | Character |
|---|---|---|---|
2020
| 2020 | Ranveer Singh † | Gully Boy | Murad Ahmed aka Gully Boy |
| 2020 | Akshay Kumar | Good Newwz | Varun Batra |
| 2020 | Ayushmann Khurrana ‡ | Dream Girl | Karam |
| 2020 | Hrithik Roshan | War | Maj. Kabir Dhaliwal |
| 2020 | Kartik Aaryan | Luka Chuppi | Guddu |
| 2020 | Shahid Kapoor | Kabir Singh | Kabir Rajdheer Singh |
| 2021 | No award Due to COVID-19 | -- | -- |
| 2022 | No award Due to COVID-19 | -- | -- |
2023
| 2023 | Anupam Kher † | The Kashmir Files | Pushkar Nath Pandit |
| 2023 | Ajay Devgn | Drishyam 2 | Vijay Salgaonkar |
| 2023 | Hrithik Roshan | Vikram Vedha | Vedha Betal |
| 2023 | Kartik Aaryan | Bhool Bhulaiyaa 2 | Ruhaan Randhawa a.k.a. Rooh Baba |
| 2023 | Ranbir Kapoor | Brahmāstra: Part One – Shiva | Shiva |
| 2023 | Varun Dhawan ‡ | Bhediya | Bhaskar Sharma |
2024
| 2024 | Sunny Deol ‡ | Gadar 2 | Tara Singh |
| 2024 | Ranbir Kapoor † | Animal | Ranvijay Singh/Aziz Haque |
| 2024 | Ranveer Singh ‡ | Rocky Aur Rani Kii Prem Kahaani | Rocky Randhawa |
| 2024 | Shah Rukh Khan ‡ | Jawan | Captain Vikram Rathore/Azad |
| 2024 | Shah Rukh Khan | Pathaan | Pathaan |
| 2024 | Vikrant Massey | 12th Fail | Manoj Kumar Sharma |
2025
| 2025 | Kartik Aaryan | Bhool Bhulaiyaa 3 | Ruhaan / Rooh Baba and Rajkumar Debendranath |
| 2025 | Hrithik Roshan | Fighter | Shamsher "Patty" Pathania |
| 2025 | Raj Kumar Rao | Stree 2 | Vicky |
| 2025 | Ajay Devgn | Shaitaan | Kabir Rishi |
| 2025 | Vicky Kaushal | Bad Newz | Akhil Chadha |
| 2025 | Shahid Kapoor | Teri Baaton Mein Aisa Uljha Jiya | Aryan Agnihotri |
2026
| 2026 | Vicky Kaushal | Chhaava | Chhatrapati Sambhaji Maharaj |
| 2026 | Ranveer Singh | Dhurandhar | Hamza Ali |
| 2026 | Akshay Kumar | Kesari Chapter 2 | Justice Chettoor Sankaran Nair |
| 2026 | Akshay Kumar | Jolly LLB 3 | Jagdishwar Mishra |
| 2026 | Sunny Deol | Jaat | Baldev Pratap Singh |
| 2026 | Dhanush | Tere Ishk Mein | Shankar Gurukkal |

== See also ==
- Zee Cine Awards
- Bollywood
- Cinema of India
