= Screen Award for Best Lyricist =

Film award

The Screen Award for Best Lyricist is a Screen Award chosen by a panel of judges from the Bollywood film industry and the winners are announced in January.

== Multiple wins ==
Wins	Recipient
5	Javed Akhtar
4	Gulzar
3	Anand Bakshi, Prasoon Joshi,
2	Amitabh Bhattacharya

== Winners ==
Year	Film – Song	Winner
1995	1942: A Love Story – Ek Ladki Ko Dekha To	Javed Akhtar
1996	Kartavya – Dhadkta Pehla Dil Mera	Rani Malik
1997	Khamoshi: The Musical – Aaj Mein Upar	Majrooh Sultanpuri
1998	Border – Sandese Aate Hai	Javed Akhtar
1999	Zakhm – Gali Mein Chand Nikla	Anand Bakshi
2000	Taal – Taal Se Taal	Anand Bakshi
2001	Mohabbatein – Humko Humise Churaalo	Anand Bakshi
2002	Dil Chahta Hai – Jaane Kyun	Javed Akhtar
2003	Sur – Aa Bhi Ja	Nida Fazli
2004	L.O.C. Kargil – Ek Saathi Aur Bhi Tha	Javed Akhtar
2005	Hum Tum – Hum Tum	Prasoon Joshi
2006	Yahaan – Naam Ada Likhna	Gulzar
2007	Omkara – Beedi Jalaile	Gulzar
2008	Taare Zameen Par – Maa	Prasoon Joshi
2009	Bachna Ae Haseeno – Khuda Jaane	Anvita Dutt Guptan
2010	Love Aaj Kal – Chor Bazaari	Irshad Kamil
2011	Ishqiya – Dil Toh Bachcha Hai Ji	Gulzar
2012	Aarakshan – Achcha Lagta Hai	Prasoon Joshi
2013	Talaash – Muskaanein Jhooti Hai	Javed Akhtar
2014	Kai Po Che – Manja	Swanand Kirkire
2015	Youngistaan – Suno Na Sangemarmar	Kausar Munir
2016	Dum Laga Ke Haisha – Moh Moh Ke Dhaage	Varun Grover
2017	Ae Dil Hai Mushkil – Ae Dil Hai Mushkil	Amitabh Bhattacharya
2018	Dangal – Haanikaarak Bapu	Amitabh Bhattacharya
2019	Raazi – Ae Watan	Gulzar
2020	Gully Boy – Apna Time Aayega	Divine & Ankur Tewari
2026	Gustaakh Ishq-Ul Julool Ishq	Gulzar

== See also ==
- Screen Awards
- Bollywood
- Cinema of India
