= Border (1997 film) =

1997 Indian film by J. P. Dutta

- Theatrical release poster
- Directed by: J. P. Dutta
- Screenplay by: J. P. Dutta
- Dialogues by: O. P. Dutta
- Story by: J. P. Dutta
- Produced by: J. P. Dutta
- Starring: Sunny Deol; Jackie Shroff; Suniel Shetty; Akshaye Khanna; Puneet Issar; Sudesh Berry; Kulbhushan Kharbanda
- Cinematography: Ishwar Bidri; Nirmal Jani
- Edited by: Deepak Wirkud; Vilas Ranade
- Music by: Score: Aadesh Shrivastava; Songs: Anu Malik
- Production company: J. P. Films
- Distributed by: Bharat Shah
- Release date: 13 June 1997
- Running time: 181 minutes
- Country: India
- Language: Hindi
- Budget: est. ₹12 crore
- Box office: est. ₹66.70 crore

Border is a 1997 Indian Hindi-language epic war film written, produced and directed by J. P. Dutta. The film stars Sunny Deol in the leading role, alongside an ensemble cast including Jackie Shroff, Suniel Shetty, and Akshaye Khanna. The movie also features Puneet Issar, Sudesh Berry, Kulbhushan Kharbanda, Tabu, Pooja Bhatt, Rakhee Gulzar, Sharbani Mukherjee, Sapna Bedi, and Rajiv Goswami in pivotal roles.

Set during the India–Pakistan war of 1971, the film is based on the events of the Battle of Longewala, a major engagement fought in the western sector of the conflict. Sunny Deol portrays Major Kuldip Singh Chandpuri, the Indian Army officer who led a company of Indian soldiers, tasked with defending Longewala against a large-scale Pakistani offensive.

Border was Dutta's dream project. He had begun working on the film's script in September 1995 and completed it by April 1996. The film was mostly shot in Bikaner, Rajasthan. Some parts were also filmed in Jodhpur. The background score of the movie was composed by Aadesh Shrivastava. Javed Akhtar penned the lyrics of the songs while Anu Malik composed the music for the songs. One of the film's songs, "Sandese Aate Hai", sung by Sonu Nigam and Roop Kumar Rathod, became one of the most popular Hindi songs of all time. The popularity of the song led several directors to offer Nigam for singing in their film's songs. The song "Mere Dushman Mere Bhai" was sung by Hariharan.

The film was released worldwide on 13 June 1997 with overwhelming positive reviews from critics and garnered critical acclaim for its story, execution, scale, showing off the battle, direction, screenplay, performances and soundtrack. It was declared an All Time Blockbuster by Box Office India. It also became the highest-grossing Hindi film of 1997 in India. Border was the fourth biggest blockbuster Indian film of the 90s decade in respective to footfalls.

On 15 August 2017, commemorating with the 70th Indian Independence Day, the Indian Directorate of Film Festivals and Ministry of Defence jointly presented the Independence Day Film Festival, where the film was screened retrospectively for its continued classic popularity and completion of 20 years.

Border won several awards at different award functions. It won three National Film Awards including Best Film on National Integration. It received 11 nominations at the 43rd Filmfare Awards, including Best Film, Best Director for J. P. Dutta, and Best Actor for Sunny Deol. Other nominations included Best Supporting Actor for Suniel Shetty and Akshaye Khanna, and Best Supporting Actress for Raakhee. It won four Filmfare awards including Best Director for J. P. Dutta and Best Male Debut for Akshaye Khanna, Best Lyricist for Javed Akhtar, and Best Playback Singer (Male) for Hariharan.

A standalone sequel named Border 2, again starring Sunny Deol and directed by Anurag Singh, was released on 23 January 2026.

== Plot ==
Regimental Insignia of the Punjab Regiment

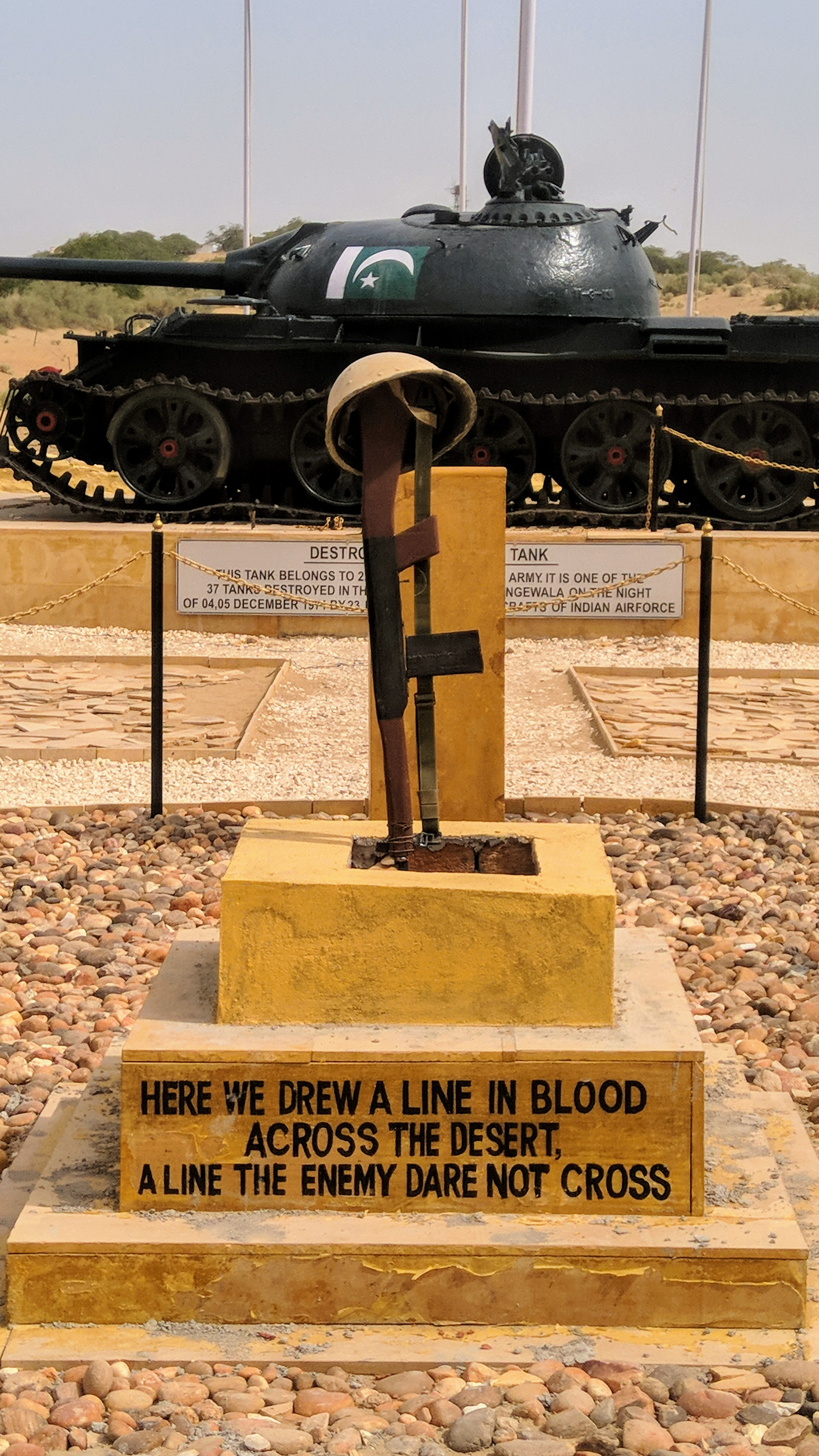
Longewala War Memorial

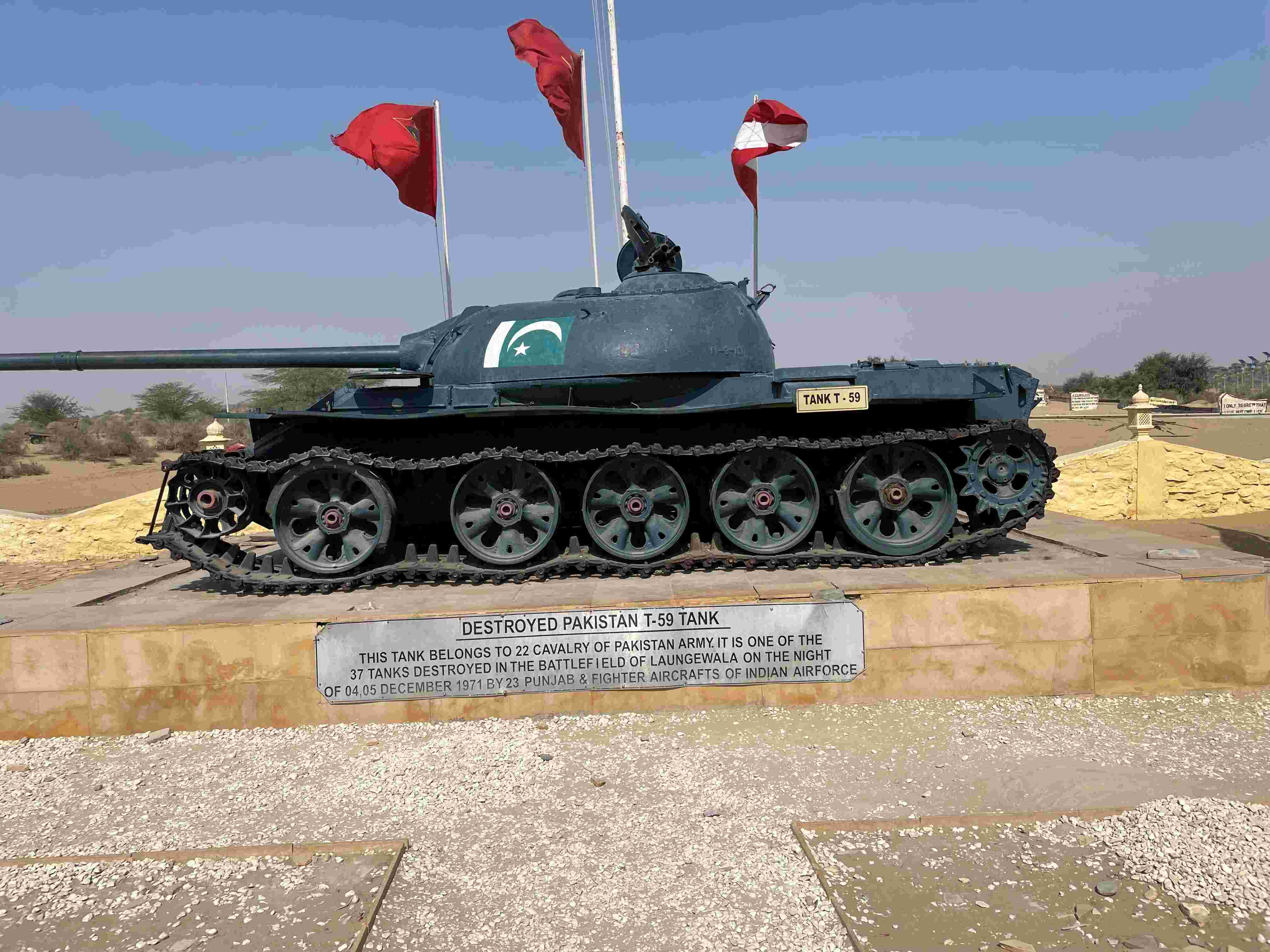
A destroyed Pakistani T-59 Tank in the Battlefield of Longewala

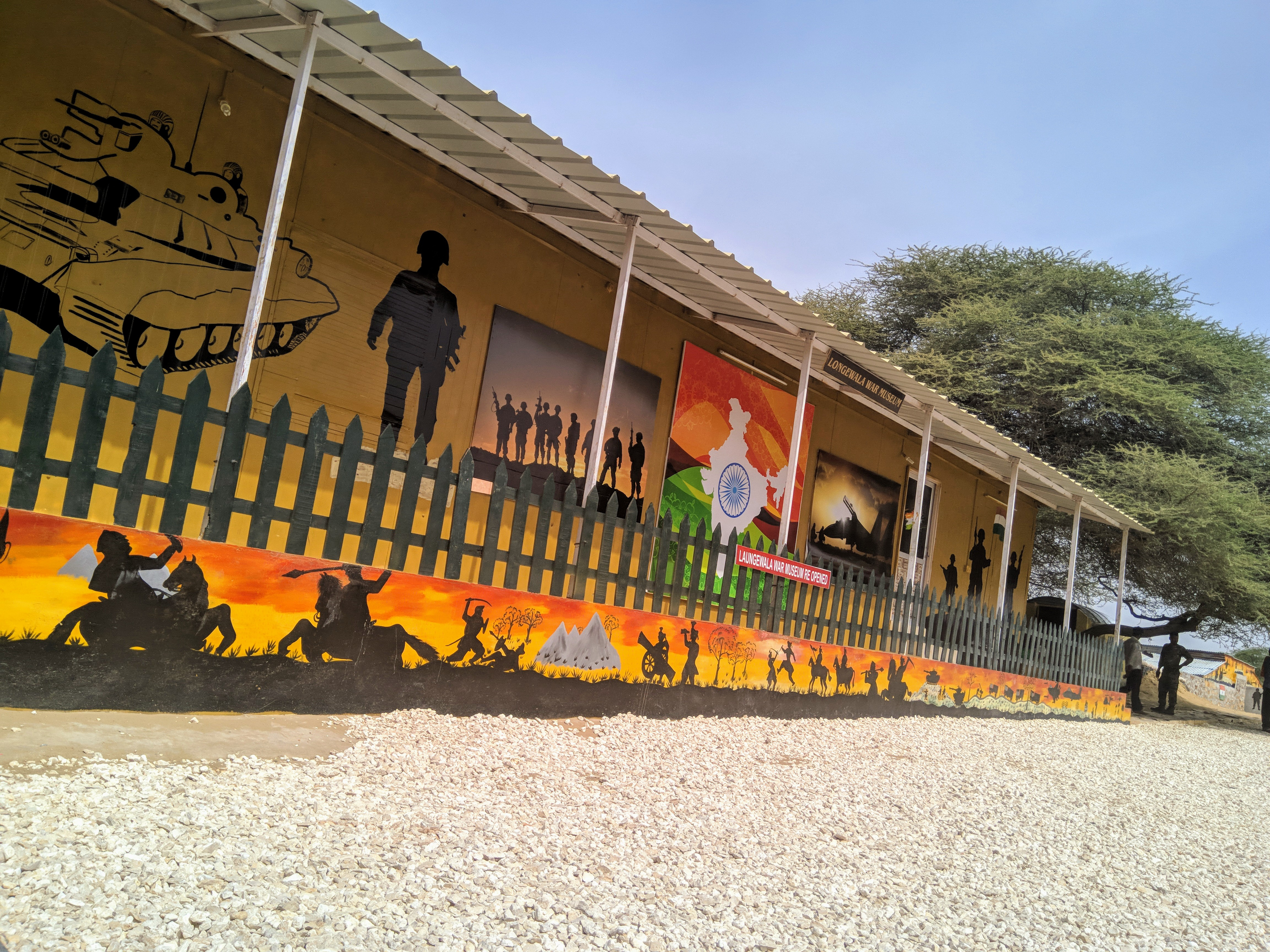
War Museum Longewala

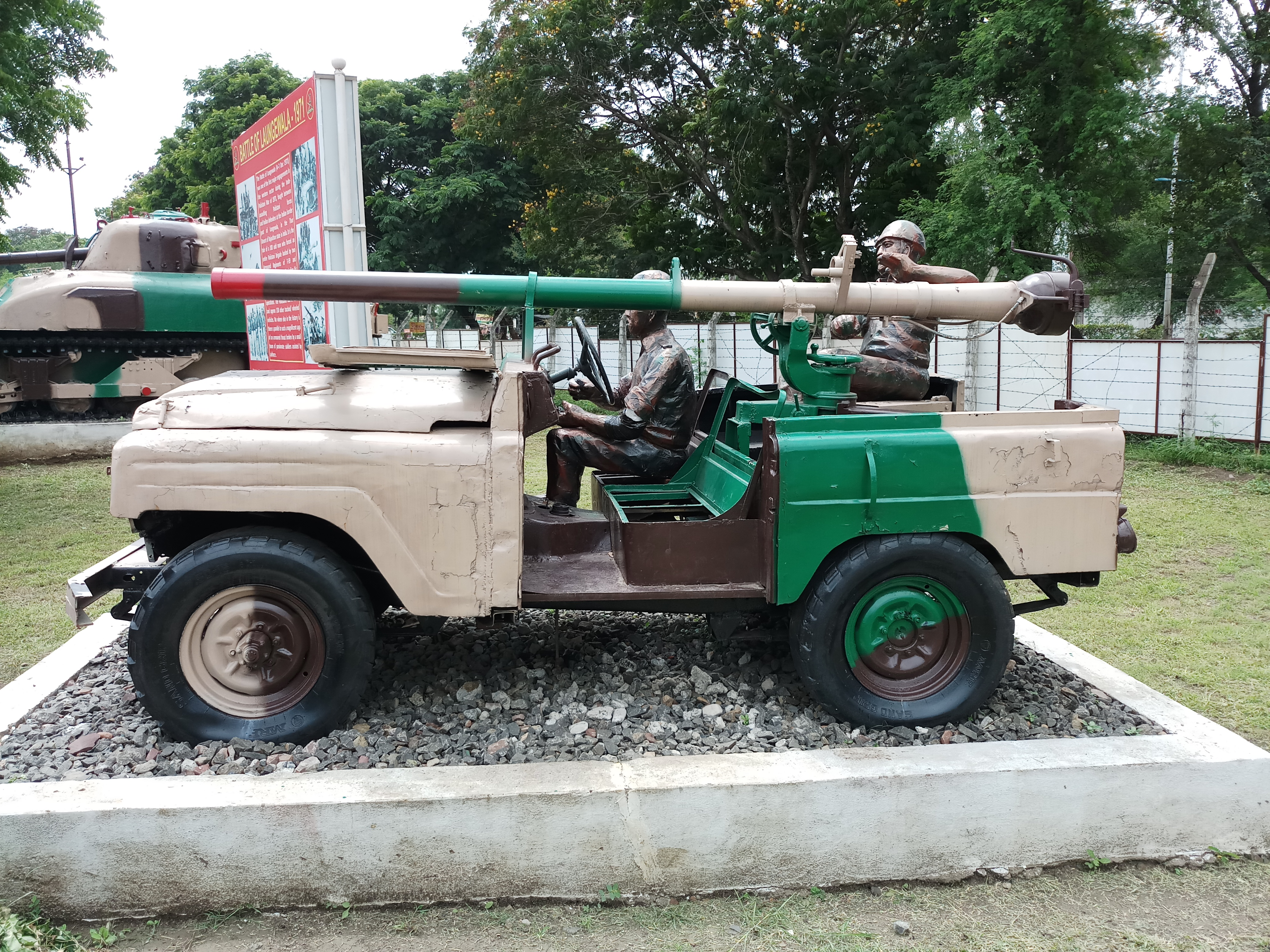
Jonga, mounted with 105 mm RCL gun, which destroyed several tanks

Just before the declaration of the India–Pakistan war of 1971, Indian Air Force Wing Commander Andy Bajwa and his wingmen take off from an operational training unit (OTU) airbase for an undisclosed airbase in Rajasthan. Upon arrival, Bajwa is briefed by his superior that he and his No. 122 (ad-hoc) Squadron have been assigned to an advance airfield in the Jaisalmer sector to fly Hawker Hunter ground attack missions in support of the Army.

He is soon joined by his brother-in-arms, Indian Army Major Kuldip Singh Chandpuri, who has recently bid a short farewell to his wife, Preeti, with a promise to return alive from war. They meet during a military courier flight and discuss the possibility of Pakistan opening a Western front in light of the East Pakistan conflict.

After reaching the FOB, Kuldip assumes command of Alpha Company (composed of 120 soldiers), of the 23rd Battalion, Punjab Regiment. He expresses concern to his CO over the light defence being assigned to the Longewala military post. He meets his 2i/c, 2nd Lieutenant Dharamvir Singh Bhakhri – the son of a 1965 India–Pakistan war veteran, late Maj. Virbhan Singh Bhakhri, who was KIA – and the company's JCO, Naib Subedar Mathura Das. Das is desperate for leave during the emergency period as his wife is suffering from cancer and there is no one to care for her and their children.

The company moves to Longewala, a remote outpost, in the Rajasthan desert and takes over a rudimentary BSF post, conducting surveillance up to the international border with Pakistan. They meet Assistant Commandant Bhairon Singh Rathore, captain of a company belonging to the 14th BSF battalion – a deeply patriotic man who expresses his love for the desert. They are later joined by the charismatic JCO, Subedar Ratan Singh, who brings two 105 mm Jonga-mounted RCL guns to serve as the anti-armour unit. Kuldip, Bhairon, Dharamvir and Ratan visit and inspect the border outpost the next day.

During a night patrol, Kuldip, Bhairon and Dharamvir encounter a group of suspicious locals who turn out to be insurgents working with the Pakistani military. Kuldip and Bhairon eliminate all but one, but Dharamvir hesitates to shoot the last man, as he has never killed anyone before. Kuldip reprimands him and shoots the insurgent himself, causing Dharamvir to vomit. Mathura Das later mocks him for his hesitation. Bhairon offers comfort, and the two bond over stories of their personal lives. Dharamvir shares how he met his fiancée, Kamla, a lively girl from his village, and how, on the day of their engagement, he received his recall-from-leave orders. Bhairon reminisces about his wedding night with his bride Phool Kanwar, and how he was recalled to duty shortly after. One day, the company's wireless operator intercepts a spy's transmission from a nearby area. Dharamvir volunteers to investigate, successfully ambushes and kills the spy, and brings back the body – demonstrating that he has overcome his fear of combat.

The unit waits for the Pakistani military's move, following radio updates. The Indian military begins mobilizing forces into nearby areas in preparation for an expected Pakistani offensive. This gives hope to the soldiers, who are weary from the long wait in the harsh desert. Letters from home lift their spirits, and Das is granted leave to tend to his ailing wife and children. However, before he leaves, Kuldip harshly rebukes him for his blatant and brash boasting about his departure and abandoning his comrades during wartime.

On the evening of 3 December 1971, the unit receives word that the Pakistan Air Force has bombed multiple Indian airbases and that war has been officially declared by Prime Minister Indira Gandhi. Kuldip sends Dharamvir and five soldiers to patrol the border section and assigns Bhairon to evacuate the nearby village to protect the villagers from being harmed.

On 4 December 1971, Pakistan Army's artillery begins shelling the post and the nearby village. As the shelling intensifies, Kuldip joins the evacuation efforts to prevent civilian casualties and reduce the collateral damage caused by enemy artillery. Meanwhile, after dusk, Dharamvir and his patrol spot a Pakistani Mobile infantry brigade – consisting of 2,000 - 3,000 soldiers from 51 Infantry Brigade and 40 tanks (Type 59 and Sherman) from 22 Armoured Regiment – crossing into India under the command of Lt Col Ghulam Dastagir. Dharamvir reports back to Kuldip. Realizing the shelling was a diversion to cover the invasion, Kuldip orders Dharamvir to stealthily follow the tanks without engaging. Meanwhile, Das returns and apologizes for leaving. He promises to stay with his unit until the war ends. Kuldip accepts the apology, welcomes him, and assigns him to one of the anti-tank jongas.

Kuldip radios for air support and speaks to Bajwa, who informs him that the base has only Hawker Hunter aircraft, which cannot conduct night missions. Bajwa expresses regret and urges Kuldip to hold the post as long as possible, promising air support at first light. Next, Kuldip radios his commanding officer, explaining the dire situation. The CO advises him to retreat but grants Kuldip full authority to decide whether to hold or abandon the post. Kuldip chooses to make a last stand but gives his men the option to leave. They all decide to stay and face the Pakistani assault together.

As Dastagir's forces close in on Longewala, one of the Pakistani tanks hits an anti-tank mine buried earlier by Kuldip's men. Dastagir orders an all-out tank assault. Kuldip responds by ordering Das to destroy enemy tanks with his Jonga-mounted RCL guns. Initially, the tide turns in India's favour, but Das's jonga is hit by a shell, wounding him. Bhairon extracts him from the burning vehicle. Das is fatally wounded while retrieving a recoil spring for Bhairon's MMG and dies in his arms. With casualties mounting, the company’s cook, Havildar Bhagiram, also enters the fray.

When an exploding shell lands perilously close to his unit, Ratan immediately leaves his LMG, lunges for the shell and throws it away, sacrificing his own life in the resulting explosion but saving the lives of several comrades. Another tank targets Bhairon's machine gun nest and destroys it, wounding him. With his remaining strength, Bhairon charges the tank and destroys it using an anti-tank mine, killing both the enemy brigade's second-in-command and himself. Dharamvir breaks through the enemy cordon and returns to the post, but his entire patrol is lost. Dastagir orders a bayonet charge, but the Indians repel it in brutal hand-to-hand stabbing combat. Dharamvir is gunned down during the melee, but not before killing many enemy soldiers with his SLR.

Kuldip captures a dying Pakistani soldier who reveals Dastagir's plan to seize Jaisalmer by morning, Jodhpur by afternoon, and reach Delhi by night — aiming to bring India under Pakistani control.

As dawn of 5 December 1971 approaches, Dastagir orders a final, desperate assault on Longewala with tanks and infantry, ignoring the threat of mines. Despite his depleted state, Kuldip arms himself with an Anti-Tank Rocket Launcher, grenades and a pistol, and rallies his remaining men for a decisive counterattack. He kills Dastagir and, with his remaining men, successfully eliminates a large number of enemy soldiers and destroys several tanks (12 tanks were destroyed in the ground battle). As the sun rises, Bajwa and his squadron launch air strikes, destroying more tanks and forcing the remaining Pakistani troops to retreat across the border. India emerges victorious.

Though the battle is won, Kuldip and his men are heartbroken by the aftermath of heavy losses on both sides. Reinforcements arrive, and the Indian Army prepares for other battles and counter-offensives. The story concludes with a grief-stricken Kuldip inspecting the war-torn battlefield, surrounded by the wreckage of war, as news of the fallen soldiers reaches their families — bringing both pride and sorrow.

== Cast ==
Actor	Role	Description	Links
Sunny Deol	Major Kuldip Singh Chandpuri, MVC, VSM	Commander of Alpha Company, 23rd Battalion, Punjab Regiment	
Jackie Shroff	Wing Commander Andy Bajwa	Leader of No. 122 (ad-hoc) Squadron	
Suniel Shetty	Asst Commandant Bhairon Singh Rathore, SM	BSF officer attached to Alpha Company	
Akshaye Khanna	2nd Lieutenant Dharamvir Singh Bhakhri	2i/c in Alpha Company, son of late Maj. Virbhan Singh Bhakhri	
Puneet Issar	Subedar Ratan Singh, VrC	Platoon leader in Alpha Company	
Sudesh Berry	Naib Subedar Mathura Das, SM	Section leader in Alpha Company	
Kulbhushan Kharbanda	Havildar Bhagiram	Head cook in Alpha Company	
Tabu	Surinder "Preeti" Kaur Chandpuri	Kuldip's wife	
Pooja Bhatt	Kamla Sodhi	Dharamvir's fiancée	
Rakhee Gulzar	Sujata Bhakhri	Dharamvir's mother, widow of late Maj. Virbhan Bhakhri	
Sharbani Mukherjee	Phool Kanwar Rathore	Bhairon's wife	
Sapna Bedi	Roopali	Bajwa's fiancée	
Rajiv Goswami	Lt Col Ghulam Dastagir	Commander of invading Pakistani army brigade	
Mahabir Bhullar	Lt Col Khursheed Hussain	Kuldip's CO	
Amrit Pal	Kamalnath Sodhi	Kamla's father	
Sanjeev Dabholkar	One of the Pakistani soldiers	Enemy soldier critically wounded during bayonet fight	
Hemant Choudhary	Sqn Ldr P. D. Somesh Uttam	Bajwa’s junior officer	

== Production ==
=== Casting ===
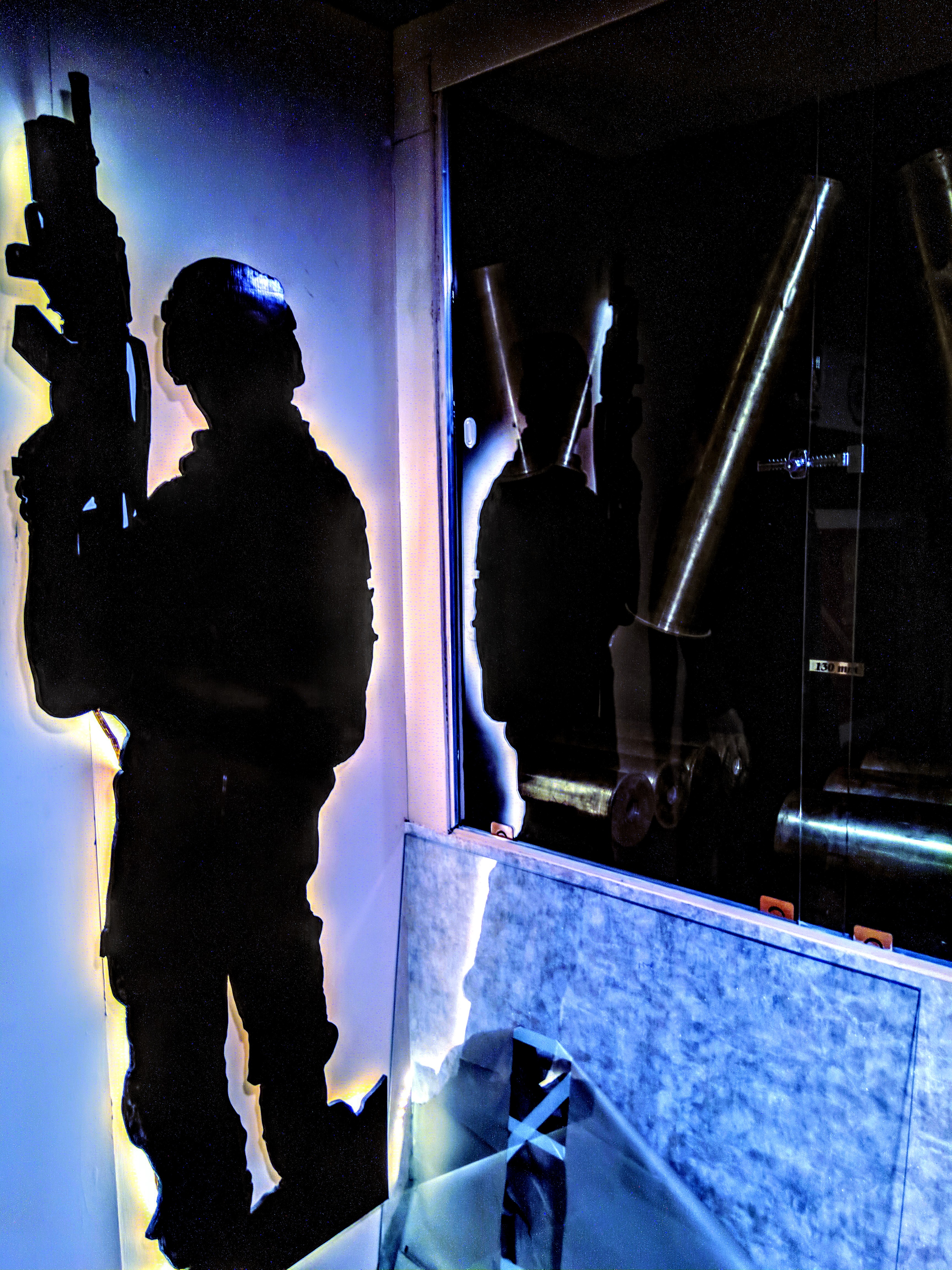
Indian Soldier's Figure at Longewala Post Museum

Sunny Deol was the first choice for the role of Major Kuldip Singh Chandpuri. Sanjay Dutt was signed to play the role of Wing Commander Andy Bajwa (character based on Wing Commander M. S. Bawa), but was replaced by Jackie Shroff, due to the former's jail sentence. Suniel Shetty had initially declined the role of Assistant Commandment Bhairon Singh Rathore (character based on BSF Lance Naik Bhairon Singh Rathore). Sanjay Kapoor and Armaan Kohli were considered for the role, before Shetty changed his mind. Ajay Devgn, Salman Khan, Aamir Khan, Akshay Kumar, and Saif Ali Khan were all offered the role of 2nd Lieutenant Dharamvir Singh Bhakhri (character based on Captain Dharamvir Singh Bhakhri). Salman declined as he felt he wasn't ready for the film; Aamir was filming for Ishq; Devgn declined as he didn't want to be featured in a multi-starrer; while Kumar and Saif declined for unknown reasons.

Puneet Issar was selected for the role of Subedar Ratan Singh, due to his resemblance to the real life Vir Chakra awardee war hero. Aditya Pancholi was considered for the role of Naib Subedar Mathura Das (character based on Sepoy Mathura Das) before Sudesh Berry was signed. Kulbhushan Kharbanda was chosen to play the role of Havildar Bhagiram (character based on Sepoy Bhagiram), who was also the company’s cook. Juhi Chawla was offered the role of Kudlip's wife, but declined as she didn't want to play a minor role. Manisha Koirala was also offered the role, but declined for the same reason. Dutta had originally wanted Sonali Bendre for the role of Bajwa's fiancee.

=== Filming ===
During production and filming, both the Indian Army and Air Force provided vehicles, grenades, rifles, machine guns and a man-portable anti-tank system, as well as uniforms and tactics used by the Pakistani Army during the Battle of Longewala. T-55 tanks resembling Chinese origin Pakistani Type-59s, weapons of the 70's era like MMGs, LMGs, RCLs, SLRs and Browning Hi-Power Pistols as well as Air Force Planes like Hawker Hunters and MiG-21s were shown. The Anti-Tank Rocket Launcher used by Sunny Deol during the iconic end scenes of the movie was the Carl-Gustaf M2. All the actors, especially Sunny Deol, Sunil Shetty, Akshaye Khanna, and Jackie Shroff, were extremely nostalgic and felt elated and honoured to be a part of such an epic war movie. After the filming, director Dutta said, "Border has a gigantic canvas on which I have tried to bring some real-life characters alive. It was shot in actual locations in the deserts of Rajasthan. For me, Border was like fighting a war."

The background portions of Dharamvir's character, portrayed by Akshaye Khanna, were filmed in Ranikhet, Uttarakhand.

== Music ==
The background score of the film was done by Aadesh Shrivastava. The lyrics of the songs were penned by Javed Akhtar and the music for the film's songs was composed by Anu Malik.

Songs like "Sandese Aate Hai", "To Chalun", "Hindustan Hindustan" and "Mere Dushman Mere Bhai" became memorable. To this day, the songs of the film are not only popular in India, but also in Pakistan.

Javed Akhtar won Filmfare Award for Best Lyricist, while Anu Malik was nominated for the Filmfare award for his work in composing the music of this movie. According to the Indian trade website Box Office India, with around 45,00,000 units sold the soundtrack became the fourth highest-selling album of the year.

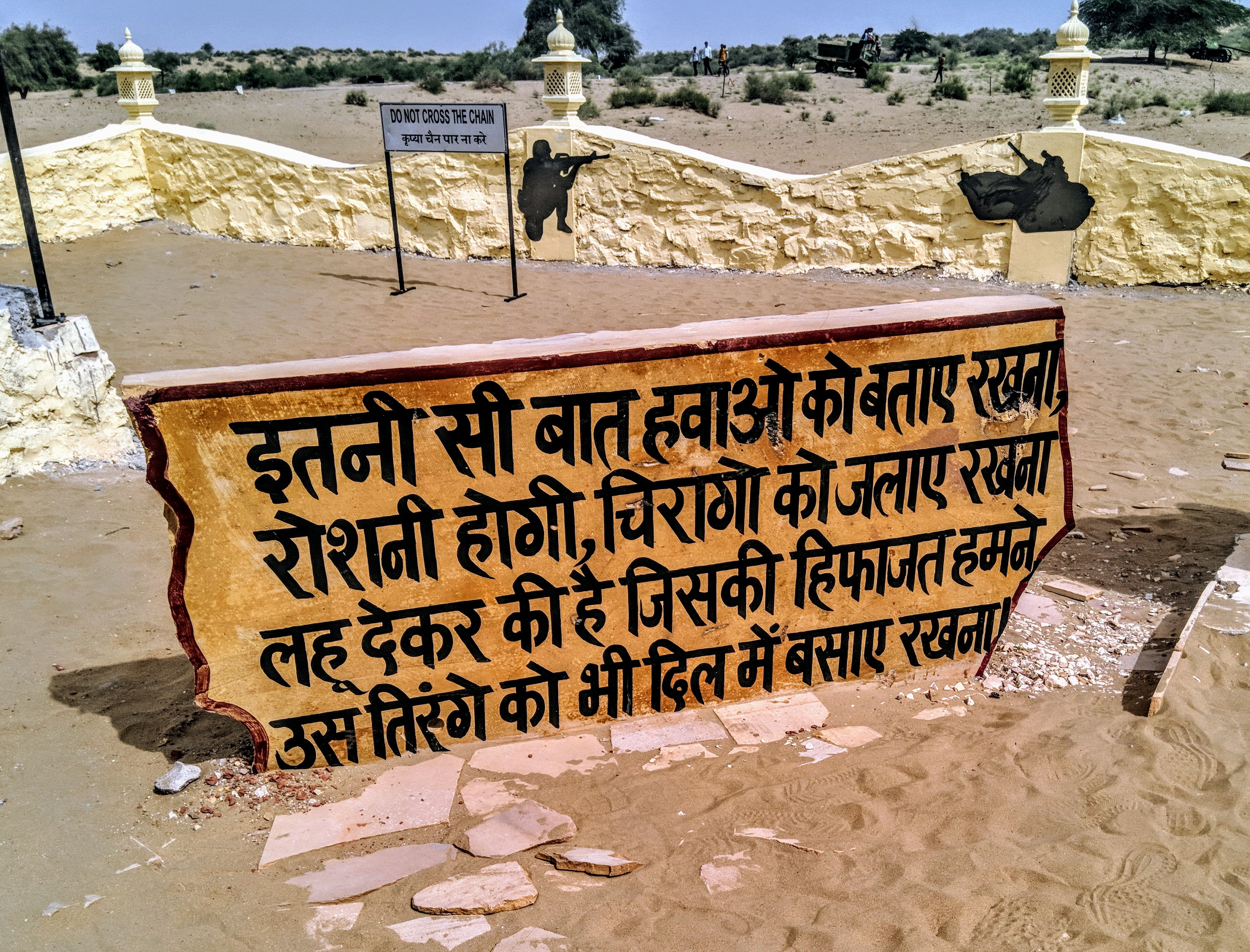
Battle of Longewala: Quote by Indian Army

== Reception ==
Border exploded onto the scene when it was released worldwide on 13 June 1997. Critics were effusive, praising its story, massive scale, direction, screenplay, performances, and especially its powerful battle execution and soundtrack. The film was an instant commercial juggernaut, opening to strong box office numbers. With a final domestic collection of ₹667 million, Box Office India declared it an All Time Blockbuster. It stood as the highest-grossing Hindi film of 1997 and was the fourth biggest Indian blockbuster of the entire '90s decade by footfalls.

== Accolades ==
Award (Note: Awards, festivals and organisations are in alphabetical order.)	Date of ceremony (Note: Date is linked to the article about the awards held that year, wherever possible.)	Category	Recipient(s)	Result	Ref.
Filmfare Awards	31 January 1998	Best Film	Border – J. P. Dutta	Nominated	
Filmfare Awards	31 January 1998	Best Director	J. P. Dutta	Won	
Filmfare Awards	31 January 1998	Best Actor	Sunny Deol	Nominated	
Filmfare Awards	31 January 1998	Best Supporting Actor	Suniel Shetty	Nominated	
Filmfare Awards	31 January 1998	Best Supporting Actor	Akshaye Khanna	Nominated	
Filmfare Awards	31 January 1998	Best Male Debut	Akshaye Khanna	Won	
Filmfare Awards	31 January 1998	Best Supporting Actress	Rakhee Gulzar	Nominated	
Filmfare Awards	31 January 1998	Best Music Director	Anu Malik	Nominated	
Filmfare Awards	31 January 1998	Best Lyricist	Javed Akhtar for "Sandese Aate Hai"	Won	
Filmfare Awards	31 January 1998	Best Male Playback Singer	Sonu Nigam, Roopkumar Rathod for "Sandese Aate Hai"	Nominated	
Filmfare Awards	31 January 1998	Best Action	Bhiku Verma, Tinnu Verma	Won	
Filmfare Awards	31 January 1998	Best Sound Recording	Vinod Potdar	Won	
National Film Awards	10 July 1998	Best Feature Film on National Integration	Producer: J. P. Dutta; Director: J. P. Dutta	Won	
National Film Awards	10 July 1998	Best Lyricist	Javed Akhtar for "Sandese Aate Hai"	Won	
National Film Awards	10 July 1998	Best Male Playback Singer	Hariharan for "Mere Dushman Mere Bhai"	Won	
Screen Awards	17 January 1998	Best Film	Border – J. P. Dutta	Won	
Screen Awards	17 January 1998	Best Director	J. P. Dutta	Won	
Screen Awards	17 January 1998	Best Screenplay	J. P. Dutta	Won	
Screen Awards	17 January 1998	Best Story	J. P. Dutta	Nominated	
Screen Awards	17 January 1998	Best Dialogue	O. P. Dutta	Nominated	
Screen Awards	17 January 1998	Best Male Debut	Akshaye Khanna	Won	
Screen Awards	17 January 1998	Best Music Director	Anu Malik	Nominated	
Screen Awards	17 January 1998	Best Background Music	Aadesh Shrivastava	Won	
Screen Awards	17 January 1998	Best Lyricist	Javed Akhtar for "Sandese Aate Hai"	Won	
Screen Awards	17 January 1998	Best Male Playback Singer	Sonu Nigam, Roopkumar Rathod for "Sandese Aate Hai"	Nominated	
Screen Awards	17 January 1998	Best Action	Bhiku Verma, Tinnu Verma	Won	
Screen Awards	17 January 1998	Best Re-recording	Suresh Kathena	Won	
Zee Cine Awards	14 March 1998	Best Film	Border – J. P. Dutta	Nominated	
Zee Cine Awards	14 March 1998	Best Director	J. P. Dutta	Won	
Zee Cine Awards	14 March 1998	Best Screenplay	J. P. Dutta	Nominated	
Zee Cine Awards	14 March 1998	Best Story	J. P. Dutta	Won	
Zee Cine Awards	14 March 1998	Best Actor – Male	Sunny Deol	Nominated	
Zee Cine Awards	14 March 1998	Best Actor in a Supporting Role – Male	Suniel Shetty	Nominated	
Zee Cine Awards	14 March 1998	Best Actor in a Supporting Role – Male	Akshaye Khanna	Won	
Zee Cine Awards	14 March 1998	Best Male Debut	Rajiv Goswami	Nominated	
Zee Cine Awards	14 March 1998	Best Female Debut	Sharbani Mukherjee	Nominated	
Zee Cine Awards	14 March 1998	Best Female Debut	Sapna Bedi	Nominated	
Zee Cine Awards	14 March 1998	Best Dialogue	O. P. Dutta	Nominated	
Zee Cine Awards	14 March 1998	Best Music Director	Anu Malik	Nominated	
Zee Cine Awards	14 March 1998	Best Background Score	Aadesh Shrivastava	Nominated	
Zee Cine Awards	14 March 1998	Best Lyricist	Javed Akhtar for "Sandese Aate Hai"	Won	
Zee Cine Awards	14 March 1998	Best Playback Singer – Male	Sonu Nigam for "Sandese Aate Hai"	Won	
Zee Cine Awards	14 March 1998	Best Cinematography	Ishwar Bidri	Nominated	
Zee Cine Awards	14 March 1998	Best Editing	Deepak Wirkud, Vilas Ranade	Won	
Zee Cine Awards	14 March 1998	Best Song Recording	Satish Gupta	Won	
Zee Cine Awards	14 March 1998	Best Make-up Artist	Subodh H. Shelke	Nominated	

== Standalone sequel ==
On 13 June 2024, it was announced that Sunny Deol will star as the main lead in the standalone sequel titled Border 2. It was directed by Anurag Singh, of Kesari (2019) fame, and was released on 23 January 2026, coinciding with Republic Day weekend. Varun Dhawan, Diljit Dosanjh and Ahan Shetty were also part of the ensembled cast.

== See also ==
- List of Asian historical drama films
- List of highest-grossing Indian films
- Uphaar Cinema fire, theatre fire in Delhi in 1997 during a screening of Border
