= Sandese Aate Hai =

Song by Sonu Nigam and Roop Kumar Rathod

from the album Border
- Language: Hindi; Hindustani
- English title: Messages come
- Length: 10:19
- Composer: Anu Malik
- Lyricist: Javed Akhtar

Music video
- "Sandese Aate Hai" (Border) on YouTube

Sandese Aate Hai (transl. Messages have arrived) is a patriotic song from the 1997 film Border, directed by J. P. Dutta. The song was penned by Javed Akhtar. The music was composed by Anu Malik and sung by Sonu Nigam and Roop Kumar Rathod. The song describes the pain of Indian soldiers and was one of the reasons for the success of the film.

For a "heart-touching" song which "became the nation's anthem", Akhtar won the Filmfare Award and the Screen Award in 1997 and 1998 respectively. He also won the National Film Award for the film. Nigam won the Zee Cine Award for the song along with the Aashirwad Award and Sansui Viewers' Choice Award. Nigam was however disappointed with the fact that Rathod was not nominated for the awards, saying that Rathod also played an equal part in the song's success. Talking about the song's popularity, Nigam said,"I knew the song was popular, but I had no idea how big it was, and how big it was going to be in a few months." In an interview, Malik said that the song "rocked the world", and felt that he deserved the National Award for it. He said that he made the song for the soldiers "to sing in their bunkers", and it took seven and a half minutes for him to compose the song.

During the screening of LOC Kargil, Dutta told Malik that an Indian soldier joined the army after hearing the song, and died in the war. The soldier's mother said to Dutta that she does not know whether she should love him or hate him, but thanked him for making LOC Kargil, adding that he made his son "live again".

This song has been recreated as "Ghar Kab Aaoge" in Border film's sequel – Border 2.
