= Hunkkaar =

2026 Indian miniseries

- Also known as: Hunkkaar: The Roar
- Genre: Social thriller; Legal drama
- Created by: Nitya Mehra; Karan D. Kapadia
- Developed by: Heeraz Marfatia
- Written by: Heeraz Marfatia; Nikhil Nair; Ravinder Randhawa; Karan D. Kapadia; Sourabh Ratnu
- Directed by: Karan D. Kapadia; Heeraz Marfatia; Nitya Mehra
- Starring: Aneet Padda; Fatima Sana Shaikh; Mohammed Zeeshan Ayyub; Arjun Mathur; Vipin Sharma
- Country of origin: India
- Original language: Hindi
- No. of seasons: 1
- No. of episodes: 6

Production
- Executive producer: Priyanka Chopra Jonas
- Producers: Ashi Dua; Karan D. Kapadia; Deepak Segal
- Cinematography: Kabir Tejpal; Kavin Jagtiani
- Editors: Dipika Kalra; Zainab Shakil
- Running time: 52–66 minutes
- Production companies: Applause Entertainment; Birla Studios; Purple Pebble Pictures; Mangata Films

Original release
- Network: JioHotstar
- Release: 25 September 2026

Hunkkaar: The Roar (Note: 'Hunkkaar' translates to 'Roar' which is already stated by the subtitle.) is a 2026 Hindi-language socio-thriller courtroom drama (Note: Quoting The Sunday Guardian, "Hunkkaar – The Roar is positioned as a socio-thriller and courtroom drama rooted in the Indian heartland."; News18 reported the genre as courtroom drama.; Cinema Express reported the genre as socio-thriller drama.) miniseries jointly directed by Karan D. Kapadia, Heeraz Marfatia and Nitya Mehra, starring Aneet Padda, Fatima Sana Shaikh, Raghubir Yadav, Mohammed Zeeshan Ayyub, Arjun Mathur and Vipin Sharma.

Created by Mehra and Kapadia, the limited series is jointly produced by Kapadia, Ashi Dua and Deepak Segal, with Priyanka Chopra Jonas serving as the executive producer.

Previously titled Nyaya, the series is about a 17-year-old sexual assault survivor seeking justice against a godman.

The series was released on 25 September 2026 on JioHotstar. It received mixed reviews from critics, with praise for premise and lead performances, but critique for pacing and execution.

== Premise ==
Meenu Rawat, a 17-year-old student at Mahasherni School at Baapji's Saburi Fort, files a complaint at the police station, accompanied by her parents, of having been sexually assaulted by Baapji, a cult leader and a godman.

In her journey to seek the justice, she is supported by ACP Jasleen Singh Soin, advocate Bhalerao and the television journalist, Amitabh Sinha.

However she also faces adversaries like media trial, slut-shaming and having to raise her voice against a powerful figure.

== Cast ==
Sources:

- Aneet Padda as Meenu Rawat (credited as Aneet Kaur Padda)
- Fatima Sana Shaikh as ACP Jasleen Singh Soin
- Raghubir Yadav as Sunil Chakosi "Baapji"
- Mohammed Zeeshan Ayyub as Babanrao Chinmay Bhalerao, public prosecutor
- Arjun Mathur as Amitabh Sinha, journalist
- Zoya Hussain as Shivani, Baapji's disciple
- Ram Kapoor as Govind Ved Prakash, Baapji's defense lawyer
- Veen Harsh as Kashyap, Baapji's son
- Rajesh Sharma as Dharampal Rawat, Meenu's father
- Charu Shankar as Vaishali Rawat, Meenu's mother
- Mohan Kapur as MD Sada, TV channel's editor-in-chief/business head
- Seema Biswas as the Judge
- Vipin Sharma as Anand's father
- Masood Akhtar as Ashwin Shri Kumar
- Niketan Sharma as Inspector Malviya
- Ravish Desai as Inspector Santosh
- Ashutosh Shukla as Jaideep Modak, Meenu’s English Professor
- Kailash Gowthaman as Bhaskar, Meenu’s classmate and love-interest
- Vidushi as Amrita, Meenu’s bestfriend

== Episodes ==
No.	Title	Directed by	Written by
1	"Aarambh"	Nitya Mehra	Ravinder Randhawa, Heeraz Marfatia
2	"Aastha"	Karan D. Kapadia	Nikhil Nair, Heeraz Marfatia
3	"Shakti"	Karan D. Kapadia	Nikhil Nair, Heeraz Marfatia
4	"Arth"	Heeraz Marfatia, Karan D. Kapadia	Nikhil Nair, Heeraz Marfatia
5	"Yudh"	Nitya Mehra, Karan D. Kapadia	Ravinder Randhawa, Heeraz Marfatia
6	"Nyaya"	Karan D. Kapadia	Karan D. Kapadia, Sourabh Ratnu

== Production ==
=== Development ===
Hunkkaar was developed by Mehra and Kapadia after the COVID-19 pandemic, in parallel to the production of the 2024 coming-of-age series, Big Girls Don't Cry, also created by the former. The story was conceived after Mehra and Kapadia had read an article on the subject matter. In an interview with The Hollywood Reporter India, Kapadia explained the writing process:

"It took me close to a year to get it to where I wanted. First I wrote the story out, and broke that into a beat sheet with the writers in the room. Then each writer took their episodes and worked on their drafts. It came back to me, I overwrote on that, and we repeated that process until we got to where I wanted in terms of tone and mentality."

=== Casting ===
Mukesh Chhabra served as the casting director of the series.

Padda auditioned and was chosen for the role when she was 19 years old. Regarding the role, at the trailer launch event, she had said:

"I was quite young when I auditioned. Moreover, the show tackles a very powerful and sensitive topic for somebody so young to fully understand. But that was perfect for the character because she was 17. Something terrible happened to her. She possibly couldn't even articulate it to herself, let alone the world. Yet, she had to do it. It kind of felt seamless because I was 19. I shot it when I was 20. The more I was reading the script, the more I kept on feeling like 'Am I lying?'. This is because all the other perspectives are so strong that it's almost making me question myself."

As part of the preparation for the role, Padda trained under acting coach, Rachit Singh.

As part of the physical transformation for the role, Yadav shaved his head.

=== Filming ===
Principal photography of Hunkkaar, then an untitled project, began in November 2023. The filming wrapped up in January 2024.

Kabir Tejpal and Kavin Jagtiani were responsible for the cinematography of the series.

=== Post-production ===
Dipika Kalra and Zainab Shakil edited the series.

The series, then titled, Nyaya was announced in August 2024 by Applause Entertainment, in their then-upcoming slate of projects to release.

== Release ==
A delayed release, despite completion, the series was stuck in a limbo, finally getting a digital release on to JioHotstar, catalysed from series' protagonist, Padda, catapulted to stardom with the 2025 romantic drama, Saiyaara. The teaser of the series was released on 1 September 2026. The trailer of the series was released on 10 September 2026.

The series was released on 25 September 2026, as part of the Hotstar Specials.

== Reception ==
Rahul Desai of The Hollywood Reporter India, highly appreciative of acting performances of the ensemble cast, writing, filmmaking and depiction of dystopian media circus and social-media trolling of an assault survivor and in his words, 'dismantling the perfect-victim syndrome,' noted, "In essence, Hunkkaar is that rare beast: a well-performed and intuitive Hindi series that mines the uncomfortable fence between procedural reality and public perception, between deep-rooted prejudice and disruptive truth."

Titas Chowdhury of News18 gave the series 4 stars out of 5, observing, "Showrunner-director Nitya Mehra and co-director Karan D Kapadia make sure that Hunkkaar isn't just about police and judicial proceedings. Yes, there's lots of it, but what forms the core of this narrative is Meenu and her family – their grief, their helplessness. What Hunkkaar gets particularly right is its dissection of the shame that society so casually places on a rape survivor."

Abhimanyu Mathur of Hindustan Times also gave the series 4 stars out of 5, particularly having praise for the acting performances of Yadav and Padda, who, in his words, are, 'opposite ends of the stardom and experience spectrum.' He noted, "Hunkkaar's biggest strength is its subtlety and finesse, most evident in its performances. Raghubir Yadav is the beating heart of this show." He further noted, regarding Padda, "With subtle voice modulation and pitch-perfect delivery, the actor showcases depth and maturity far beyond her years in Hunkkaar."

Noorulain Sayed of The Free Press Journal gave the series 4 stars out of 5 as well, writing, "Hunkkaar: The Roar is a gripping six-episode series that tackles sexual violence, victim-shaming and blind faith in a powerful, nuanced manner. Aneet Kaur Padda delivers a standout performance, ably supported by Mohammed Zeeshan Ayyub and Arjun Mathur. Despite a familiar plot and miscast villain, strong direction, aesthetics and performances make it a riveting watch."

Shreyas Pande of The Hindu, in his review for the series, concluded, "It is the earnest performances by the cast that ultimately works in the favour of Hunkkaar even as it falters. Despite its shortfalls, the show appeals with the heartfelt rigor in its writing and aesthetics. Creators Nitya Mehra and Karan Kapadia bring a sensitive gaze, adding a sense of respect in their filmmaking choices, allowing the show to have a dignified life of its own without being watered down by algorithmic tensions. Even though not completely achieving what it sets out to, Hunkkaar's reclaimation of justice outweighs some of its tonal inconsistencies, representing, ultimately, a victory of conscience."

Archika Khurana of The Times of India gave the series 3.5 stars out of 5, noting, "Thematically, Hunkkaar is most effective when it examines how society responds to women who refuse to conform. The series understands that the battle for justice does not necessarily end when a complaint is filed. For someone like Meenu, the real struggle begins afterwards, when her personal life, behaviour and credibility are dissected by everyone around her." Juxtaposing against Aashram, she further noted, "Comparisons with Ashram are inevitable because of the subject matter, but Hunkkaar attempts to distinguish itself by focusing more closely on the victim, the investigation and the institutional machinery surrounding the case. Unfortunately, its inconsistent writing prevents that identity from becoming fully defined."

A critic at Bollywood Hungama also gave the series 3.5 stars out of 5, concluding, "On the whole, HUNKKAAR - THE ROAR is a hard-hitting and impactful courtroom drama that works due to its exemplary direction, powerful performances and several memorable sequences. The excessive length, multiple sub-plots and a few unconvincing developments dilute the impact to an extent. Nevertheless, its strong subject, gripping courtroom portions and the curiosity to see what Aneet Padda has to offer after SAIYAARA should help the show attract healthy viewership."

Devesh Sharma of Filmfare gave the series 3.5 stars out of 5 as well, noting, "What Hunkkaar gets right is the frightening machinery of blind faith. The systematic brainwashing of victims, the unquestioning loyalty of devotees and the hatred directed at anyone who dares to challenge their spiritual leader are depicted with disturbing realism." He further noted, "The series also captures the emotional cost of pursuing justice. Meenu isn't simply fighting a legal battle. She is fighting public humiliation, intimidation and a society that seems more concerned about protecting a powerful man's reputation than listening to her."

Shweta Keshri of India Today gave the series 3 stars out of 5, with praise for the acting performances of the ensemble cast, particularly that of Shaikh, Padda and Yadav, however being critical of the writing. She wrote, "That is also where Hunkkaar's strongest aspect — its premise — begins to expose the limitations of its writing. We see a sinister Baapji who commands a huge following, but the show does not really explore what makes his devotees follow him so blindly. His power is repeatedly established through crowds, fear and loyalty, but the machinery behind that influence remains largely unexplored. How did he build this following? Why do people continue to defend him when serious allegations are made? What makes it so difficult for those around him to question him? The series raises these questions without digging deeply enough into them."

Radhika Sharma of NDTV also gave the series 3 stars out of 5 and summed up in her review, "This is the Aneet Padda before the glam-sham of Bollywood. Raw, baring her soul."

Aakruti Bagla of Mid-Day concluded in her review, "Hunkkaar raises an important conversation around victim-shaming, patriarchy and faith, backed by strong performances and a compelling premise. However, its uneven pacing, repetitive writing and predictable conclusion keep it from delivering the hard-hitting impact it promises."

Kaveree Bamzai of Open Magazine observed, "Both sinister and benign, the series manages to say a lot about the state of the media, professional trolls and the reality of those who are slaves to their faith."

Bhumi Vashisht of The Sunday Guardian summed up in her review for the series, "Hunkkaar: The Roar blends crime, courtroom drama and social thriller elements around a teenager's accusation against a powerful godman. Fatima Sana Shaikh, Aneet Padda and Raghubir Yadav deliver strong performances, even as uneven pacing and underdeveloped writing limit the series."

Shubhra Gupta of The Indian Express gave the series 2.5 stars out of 5, summing up in her review, "Aneet Padda, Fatima Sana Shaikh remain largely convincing, and own the best moments of the six-episode show."

Sukanya Verma of Rediff.com also gave the series 2.5 stars out of 5 and wrote, "Sadly, Hunkkaar never becomes more than a sum of its parts. It's a fairly familiar fight for justice that builds far too many flimsy narratives around its core conflict, runs out of ammunition and speaks out of turn in a needlessly cussing tone." Appreciative of the portrayals by the actors, while also being critical of the writing, she noted in her review, "All capable actors but often it's them left raising the bar when the subpar writing lets them down."

Kartik Bhardwaj of Cinema Express gave the series 2.5 stars out of 5 as well, writing in the epigraph of his review, "Hunkkaar ticks off the same tropes these predator-godmen-resilient-victim narratives are inundated with. It just goes a few inches deeper."

Nandini Ramnath of the Scroll.in concluded in her review, "Given the fair amount of films and shows about perverted godmen, Hunkkaar could have benefitted from a clinically methodical approach rather than righteous rage. In trying to be hard-hitting, Hunkkaar often comes off as heavy-handed."

Tatsam Mukherjee of The Wire wrote, "Hunkkaar: The Roar flirts with being a competent procedural, and offering potent socio-political commentary on our country. However, as busy and stacked it might be, I found it too self-serious and burdened with its own ideology."
