= Screen Award for Best Male Playback =

Annual film award in India

Screen Award for Best Male Playback singer
- Awarded for: Award for Best Male Playback singer
- Country: India
- Presented by: Screen India
- First award: Kumar Sanu, 1942: A Love Story (1995)
- Currently held by: Faheem Abdullah, Saiyaara (2026)

The Screen Award for Best Male Playback singer is chosen by a distinguished panel of judges from the Indian Bollywood film industry and the winners are announced in January.

== Winners ==
=== Most wins ===
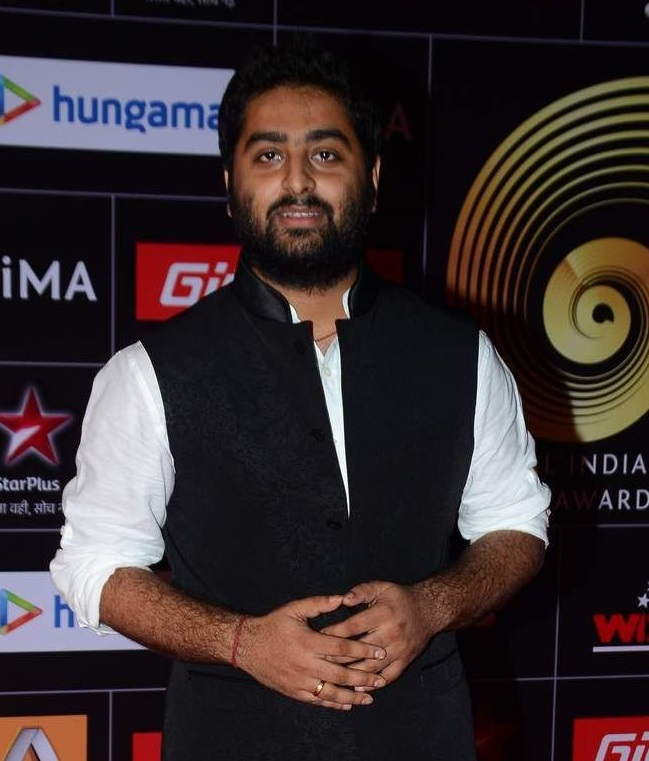
Arijit Singh holds the record of maximum awards in the category, with four wins

Winner	Number of wins	Years
Arijit Singh	4	2014, 2015, 2018, 2019
Sonu Nigam	3	2002, 2005, 2006
Sukhwinder Singh	2	1999, 2000
Rahat Fateh Ali Khan	2	2010, 2011
Udit Narayan	2	1997, 2003

=== List of winners ===
Year	Winner	Song	Film
1995	Kumar Sanu	"Ek Ladki Ko Dekha"	1942: A Love Story
1996	Hariharan	"Dil Ne Dil Se"	Haqeeqat
1997	Udit Narayan	"Aaye Ho Mere Zindagi Main"	Raja Hindustani
1998	Abhijeet Bhattacharya	"Main Koi Aisa Geet"	Yes Boss
1999	Sukhwinder Singh	"Chaiyya Chaiyya"	Dil Se..
2000	Sukhwinder Singh	"Ramta Jogi"	Taal
2001	Lucky Ali	"Na Tum Jaano Na Hum"	Kaho Na Pyar Hai
2002	Sonu Nigam	"Tanhayi"	Dil Chahta Hai
2003	Udit Narayan	"Woh Chand Jaisi Ladki"	Devdas
2004	Kailash Kher	"Alla Ke Bande"	Waisa Bhi Hota Hai Part II
2005	Sonu Nigam	"Main Hoon Na"	Main Hoon Na
2006	Sonu Nigam	"Dheere Jalna"	Paheli
2007	Shaan	"Chand Sifarish"	Fanaa
2008	Soham Chakraborty	"In Dino"	Life In A... Metro
2009	KK	"Khuda Jaane"	Bachna Ae Haseeno
2010	Rahat Fateh Ali Khan	"Aaj Din Chadheya"	Love Aaj Kal
2011	Rahat Fateh Ali Khan	"Dil Toh Baccha Hai Ji"	Ishqiya
2012	Mohit Chauhan	"Saadda Haq" "Phir Se Ud Chala"	Rockstar
2013	Javed Ali	"Ishaqzaade"	Ishaqzaade
2014	Arijit Singh	"Tum Hi Ho"	Aashiqui 2
2015	Arijit Singh	"Muskurane"	CityLights
2016	Papon	"Moh Moh Ke Dhaage"	Dum Laga Ke Haisha
2017	Amit Mishra	"Bulleya"	Ae Dil Hai Mushkil
2018	Arijit Singh	"Zaalima" "Galti Se Mistake"	Raees; Jagga Jasoos
2019	Arijit Singh	"Ae Watan"	Raazi
2020	Sachet Tandon	"Bekhayali"	Kabir Singh
2026	Faheem Abdullah	"Saiyaara"	Saiyaara

== See also ==
- Screen Awards
- Bollywood
- Cinema of India
