= Saiyaara (soundtrack) =

2025 soundtrack album by various artists

Saiyaara (Original Motion Picture Soundtrack)

Soundtrack album by Sachet–Parampara, Tanishk Bagchi, The Rish, Vishal Mishra, Faheem Abdullah and Arslan Nizami
- Released: 4 July 2025 (Standard); 10 September 2025 (Extended)
- Studios: Aural Dimension Recording Studio, Mumbai; Trinity Sounds Studio, Mumbai; VMS Studios, Mumbai; SP Studios, Mumbai; Living Water Music Studios, Mumbai; The Sanctuary, Mumbai; YRF Studios, Mumbai
- Genre: Feature film soundtrack
- Length: 31:03 (Standard); 1:08:06 (Extended)
- Language: Hindi
- Label: YRF Music
- Producers: Tanishk Bagchi; Ganesh Waghela; Krishna Kishor; DJ Phukan; Vaibhav Pani; Sachet–Parampara; Swapnil Tare; Raghav Sharma; Godswill Mergulhão; Rishabh Kant
External audio
- Saiyaara – Full Song Audio Jukebox on YouTube
- Saiyaara – Extended Album on YouTube

Singles from Saiyaara
- 1. "Saiyaara" Released: 3 June 2025; 2. "Barbaad" Released: 10 June 2025; 3. "Tum Ho Toh" Released: 17 June 2025; 4. "Humsafar" Released: 24 June 2025; 5. "Dhun" Released: 1 July 2025

Saiyaara (Original Motion Picture Soundtrack) is the soundtrack album to the 2025 film of the same name directed by Mohit Suri and produced by Akshaye Widwani under Yash Raj Films, starring debutants Ahaan Panday and Aneet Padda. The soundtrack consists of seven songs composed by Mithoon, Sachet–Parampara, Tanishk Bagchi, The Rish, Vishal Mishra, Faheem Abdullah and Arslan Nizami with lyrics written by Mithoon, Kant, Raj Shekhar, and Irshad Kamil. The soundtrack was released through YRF Music on 4 July 2025. The extended album, that contained eighteen additional songs (used as background music), released on 10 September 2025.

To mark the film's first anniversary in July 2026, Yash Raj Films released a two-disc limited collector's edition vinyl LP unveiled by lead actors at Wembley Stadium.

== Background ==
"Saiyaara album is my tribute to the best romantic albums that I have loved to watch, and it is my tribute to the first Aashiqui, whose music left me spellbound. I didn't know what hit me and it made me fall in love with music... that love story is still continuing with every film that I direct [...] It is very rare to have the best talent of the country to be a part of a film music album and I'm delighted that Saiyaara has the best musical geniuses of India pouring their hearts out to create a romantic album that hopefully will stand the test of time.

— Mohit Suri on the soundtrack to Saiyaara.

The album for Saiyaara consisted of multiple composers working on each song, bypassing YRF's strategy of working on only single composers for an album; the previous YRF soundtrack to have multiple artists was for Detective Byomkesh Bakshy! (2015). Mithoon, a recurrent composer of Suri's works since Aashiqui 2 (2013) also associated with one of the songs, while also introducing new voices: Kashmiri musicians Faheem Abdullah, Arslan Nizami and Rishabh Kant, who was credited as The Rish. Other prominent artists include Tanishk Bagchi, Vishal Mishra and Sachet–Parampara, who also worked in several multi-composer albums. Suri considered the album as a tribute to the successful soundtrack of Aashiqui (1990).

== Release ==
The seven-track album was preceded by five singles, with each of them being released on Tuesdays. The first song, "Saiyaara" was released on 3 June 2025, followed by the second song "Barbaad" on 10 June. The third song "Tum Ho Toh" was released on 17 June, and the fourth and fifth songs "Humsafar" and "Dhun" released on 24 June and 1 July, respectively. The reprised version of "Saiyaara" and "Barbaad" released along with the album on 4 July.

The extended edition of the album featuring eighteen additional songs were released on 10 September 2025.

== Critical reception ==
The music was instrumental in creating anticipation among moviegoers. Industry insiders noted that the film's "chartbuster soundtrack" worked in its favor, transforming it from "a mid-sized film to a tentpole romantic event" especially the titular track which topped several music, video and other short-form platforms.

Radhika Sharma of NDTV wrote "Its soundtrack, consisting of songs such as Saiyaara, Barbaad, and Tum Ho Toh, is both hummable as well as head-bangy. If it takes almost the whole of the music industry (there are seven composers and four lyricists in credits) to build a complete and contemporary music album, it should be made a norm". Dhaval Roy of The Times of India wrote "The film's emotional core finds a match in its evocative music by Faheem Abdullah, Tanishk Bagchi, Rishabh Kant, Vishal Mishra, Arslan Nizami, Mithoon, and Sachet-Parampara. John Stewart Eduri's background score enhances the overall experience".

Rishabh Suri of Hindustan Times wrote "Music has always been a strength in Mohit's films, and this time too, he doesn't disappoint. Tanishk Bagchi, Arslan Abdullah, and Faheem Nizami compose genuinely moving tracks. Personal picks: the title song and the beautifully shot Tum Ho Toh, sung by Vishal Mishra." Anuj Kumar of The Hindu stated, "the tripping soundtrack, put together by five composers, grows on your senses". Nandini Ramnath of Scroll.in noted "The songs take the story forward rather than coming in the way. [it's] lingering flavour isn't restricted to the music, particularly the title track written by Irshad Kamil, composed by Tanishk Bagchi, Faheem Abdullah, Arslan Nizami and sung by Abdullah". Rahul Desai of The Hollywood Reporter India described the song "Saiyaara" as "earwormy in the most Vishesh Films-coded way".

== Track listing ==
Saiyaara (Original Motion Picture Soundtrack)
No.	Title	Lyrics	Music	Singer(s)	Length
1.	"Saiyaara"	Irshad Kamil	Tanishk Bagchi, Faheem Abdullah, Arslan Nizami	Faheem Abdullah	6:09
2.	"Barbaad"	The Rish	The Rish	Jubin Nautiyal	5:57
3.	"Tum Ho Toh"	Raj Shekhar	Vishal Mishra	Vishal Mishra, Hansika Pareek	5:18
4.	"Humsafar"	Irshad Kamil, Prashant Pandey	Sachet-Parampara	Sachet Tandon, Parampara Thakur	5:22
5.	"Dhun"	Mithoon	Mithoon	Arijit Singh	4:36
6.	"Saiyaara Reprise – Female"	Irshad Kamil	Tanishk Bagchi, Faheem Abdullah, Arslan Nizami	Shreya Ghoshal	3:03
7.	"Barbaad Reprise – Female"	The Rish	The Rish	Shilpa Rao	2:10
Total length:					32:36

Saiyaara (Extended Album)
No.	Title	Lyrics	Music	Singer(s)	Length
8.	"Barbaad – Rock Version"	The Rish	The Rish	The Rish	2:37
9.	"Saath Tu Chal Humsafar" (credited as "Humsafar – Hip Hop Version" in the credits)	Mellow D, Irshad Kamil	Sachet-Parampara	Sachet Tandon, Mellow D (rap)	2:27
10.	"Vaani Batra"	Irshad Kamil	Tanishk Bagchi, Faheem Abdullah, Arslan Nizami, John Stewart Eduri	Shreya Ghoshal	1:56
11.	"Krish Kapoor"	Mithoon	Mithoon, John Stewart Eduri	Arijit Singh	0:56
12.	"Tu Paas Hai"	Irshad Kamil	Tanishk Bagchi, Faheem Abdullah, Arslan Nizami, John Stewart Eduri	Faheem Abdullah, Arslan Nizami	1:02
13.	"Raahon Pe Teri"	Instrumental	Sachet-Parampara, John Stewart Eduri	Instrumental	1:18
14.	"Dimaag Bhool Jaayega, Par Dil Nahin"	Irshad Kamil	Tanishk Bagchi, Faheem Abdullah, Arslan Nizami, John Stewart Eduri	Faheem Abdullah, Arslan Nizami	1:24
15.	"Khushi Ko Barbaad Hone Mein"	The Rish	The Rish, John Stewart Eduri	The Rish	1:48
16.	"Go Follow Your Dream"	The Rish	The Rish, John Stewart Eduri	Jubin Nautiyal	3:02
17.	"Forever and Ever and Ever"	Irshad Kamil	Tanishk Bagchi, Faheem Abdullah, Arslan Nizami, John Stewart Eduri	Faheem Abdullah, Arslan Nizami	2:21
18.	"Pata Chal Gaya Na!"	Irshad Kamil	Tanishk Bagchi, Faheem Abdullah, Arslan Nizami, John Stewart Eduri	Faheem Abdullah, Arslan Nizami	2:17
19.	"I'm Not Letting You Go!"	Instrumental	Tanishk Bagchi, Faheem Abdullah, Arslan Nizami, John Stewart Eduri	Instrumental	1:30
20.	"Taaron Mein Ek Tanha Taara"	Irshad Kamil	Tanishk Bagchi, Faheem Abdullah, Arslan Nizami, John Stewart Eduri	Faheem Abdullah, Arslan Nizami, Suzanne D'Mello	2:09
21.	"Jaa Yahaan Se!"	Irshad Kamil	Tanishk Bagchi, Faheem Abdullah, Arslan Nizami, John Stewart Eduri	Faheem Abdullah, Arslan Nizami, Suzanne D'Mello	2:03
22.	"Apne Pyaar Ke Liye, Khud Ko Khatam Mat Karna"	Instrumental	John Stewart Eduri	Instrumental	1:54
23.	"Uske Liye Yeh Gaana Banaao"	Irshad Kamil	Tanishk Bagchi, Faheem Abdullah, Arslan Nizami, John Stewart Eduri	Faheem Abdullah, Arslan Nizami	2:07
24.	"Woh Aayegi, Bhaagte Hue, I Promise"	Instrumental	Tanishk Bagchi, Faheem Abdullah, Arslan Nizami, John Stewart Eduri	Instrumental	1:53
25.	"I Love You Krish Kapoor!"	Irshad Kamil	Tanishk Bagchi, Faheem Abdullah, Arslan Nizami, John Stewart Eduri	Faheem Abdullah, Arslan Nizami, Suzanne D'Mello	3:22
Total length:					1:08:06

== Personnel ==
Credits adapted from YRF Music:

- Music composers: Tanishk Bagchi, Faheem Abdullah, Arslan Nizami (tracks: 1, 6), Rishabh Kant (tracks: 2, 7), Vishal Mishra (track: 3), Sachet–Parampara (track: 4), Mithoon (track: 5)
- Lyricists: Irshad Kamil (tracks: 1, 4, 6), Rishabh Kant (tracks: 2, 7), Raj Shekhar (track: 3), Mithoon (track: 5)
- Singers: Faheem Abdullah (track: 1), Jubin Nautiyal (track: 2), Vishal Mishra (track: 3), Hansika Pareek (track: 3), Sachet Tandon (track: 4), Parampara Thakur (track: 4), Arijit Singh (track: 5), Shreya Ghoshal (track: 6), Shilpa Rao (track: 7)
- Music production: Tanishk Bagchi (tracks: 1, 6), Ganesh Waghela (tracks: 1, 6), Krishna Kishor (tracks: 1, 6), DJ Phukan (track: 2), Vaibhav Pani (tracks: 3, 4), Sachet–Parampara (track: 4), Swapnil Tare (track: 4), Raghav Sharma (track: 4), Godswill Mergulhão (track: 5), Rishabh Kant (track: 7)
- Music supervisor: Yash Anand
- Recording engineers: Calvin Fernandes (Aural Dimension Recording Studio, Mumbai) [track: 1], DJ Phukan (Trinity Sounds Studio, Mumbai) [track: 2], Trihangku Lahkar (VMS Studios, Mumbai) [track: 3], Sachet–Parampara (SP Studios, Mumbai) [track: 4], Swapnil Tare (track: 4), A Manivannan (Living Water Music Studios, Mumbai) [track: 5], Eli Rodrigues (track: 5), Vedant Uttarkar (The Sanctuary, Mumbai) [track: 6], Abhishek Khandelwal (YRF Studios, Mumbai) [track: 7]
- Mixing and mastering engineers: Eric Pillai (Future Sound Of Bombay, Mumbai) [tracks: 1, 2, 5, 6], Trihangku Lahkar (VMS Studios, Mumbai) [track: 3], Shadab Rayeen (New Edge Sound Studios, Mumbai) [track: 4], Michael Edwin Pillai (track: 5), Hanish Taneja (Studio Alika, Mumbai) [track: 7]
- Musical assistance: Kumar Gaurav Singh, Trihangku Lahkar, Bitupon Boruah, Anugrah, Godswill Mergulhao, Eli Rodrigues, Kaushal Gohil
- Mithoon's manager: Vijay Iyer (track: 5)
- Mithoon's staff: Navnath Bacche, Ganesh Raut, Sanjeev Utekar (track: 5)
- Creative head: Anugrah (track: 5)

Musicians

- Guitars: Kalyan Baruah (track: 1, 5), Vaibhav Pani (track: 3), Sagar Sathe (track: 4), Bibhash Buragohain (track: 7)
- piano: Tanishk Bagchi (track: 1)
- Rubab: Krishna Kishor (track: 1)
- Bass: Napier Peter Naveen (track: 1)
- Violins: Rajesh, Melvin (track: 1)
- Female choir: Kamalaja (track: 1), Alisha (track: 1), Fathima (track: 1), Aarthi (track: 1)
- Male choir: Rahul (track: 1), Suganth (track: 1), Abijith (track: 1), Sanjay (track: 1)
- Live sarangi: Dilshad Khan (track: 2)
- Electric Violin: Arbaz Khan (track: 2)
- Electric guitars: Ishan Das (track: 2), Daanish Sharma (track: 2), Arbaz Khan (track: 2), Rishabh Kant (track: 2, 7), Kandarpa Kalita (track: 3), Kalyan Baruah (track: 4), Bibhash Buragohain (track: 4), Bhushan Chitnis (track: 7)
- Acoustic guitars: Ishan Das (track: 2), Arbaz Khan (track: 2), Kandarpa Kalita (track: 3), Kalyan Baruah (track: 4), Bhushan Chitnis (track: 7)
- Live synthesizers: Rishabh Kant (track: 2), Asad Shabbir (track: 2)
- Beatboxers: Ishita Jagta (track: 4), Shivali Shripad Joshi (track: 4), Sadhana Bhikaji Tawde (track: 4)
- Backing vocals: Harjot Kaur (track: 2), Akanksha Bhandari (track: 7)

== Charts ==
Chart performance for Saiyaara (Original Motion Picture Soundtrack)
Chart (2025)	Peak position
UK Soundtrack Albums (Official Charts)	24

Weekly chart performance for "Saiyaara"
Chart (2025)	Peak position
Global 200 (Billboard)	8
India (Billboard)	1
Middle East and North Africa (IFPI)	5
New Zealand Hot Singles (RMNZ)	25
Saudi Arabia (IFPI)	8
United Arab Emirates (IFPI)	1
UK Singles (Official Charts)	65
UK Asian Music (OCC)	1
UK Indie (Official Charts)	14

Chart performance for "Humsafar"
Chart (2025)	Peak position
India (Billboard)	10

Chart performance for "Tum Ho Toh"
Chart (2025)	Peak position
Global Excl. US (Billboard)	137
India (Billboard)	6
United Arab Emirates (IFPI)	16

Weekly chart performance for "Saiyaara Reprise – Female"
Chart (2025)	Peak position
Global Excl. US (Billboard)	112
India (Billboard)	4
United Arab Emirates (IFPI)	12
UK Asian Music (OCC)	2
UK Indie (Official Charts)	43
UK Video Streaming (OCC)	21

== Recreation ==
In August 2025, an AI-generated video of the title song using singer Kishore Kumar’s voice circulated widely on social media. The video reimagines the song by overlaying its melody onto the sing "Rimjhim Gire Sawan" from the 1979 film Manzil, depicting Amitabh Bachchan and Moushumi Chatterjee walking and romancing in the rain on the streets of Mumbai. Pakistani singer-actor Ali Zafar released a cover of the title song on 24 August 2025.
