= Ahaan Panday =

Indian actor (born 1997)

- Panday in 2025
- Born: 23 December 1997 (age 28); Mumbai, Maharashtra, India
- Education: University of Mumbai (BFA)
- Occupation: Actor
- Years active: 2025–present
- Relatives: Panday family

Ahaan Panday (born 23 December 1997) is an Indian actor who works in Hindi films. Panday made his acting debut with the musical romance Saiyaara (2025), a major critical and commercial success. The film earned him several awards including IIFA Award for Star Debut of the Year – Male.

== Early life and background ==
Panday was born in Mumbai to Aloke "Chikki" Panday, a businessman, and Deanne Panday, a former model and wellness coach. Through his mother, he has Scottish, Portuguese (Luso-Indian) and Nepali ancestry. He attended Oberoi International School and later pursued a bachelor of fine arts in cinematic arts and production from University of Mumbai. He is the grandson of heart surgeon Sharad Panday, nephew of actor Chunky Panday and cousin to actress Ananya Panday.

== Career ==
Panday began his career as an assistant director, making his debut in Sohail Khan's Freaky Ali (2016), followed by Rock On 2 (2016) and Mardaani 2 (2019). In 2023, he served as an assistant director on the Netflix miniseries The Railway Men: The Untold Story of Bhopal 1984.

Panday made his acting debut in 2025 with Saiyaara, where he played a musician opposite Aneet Padda. Rishabh Suri of Hindustan Times noted, "Ahaan makes a confident debut as Krish. He pulls off an intense role in his very first outing, and that deserves praise. He emotes well and carries the spark of a romantic hero." A major commercial success, the film grossed over ₹579 crore (US$62 million) worldwide, emerging as the third highest-grossing Hindi film of the year and one of the highest-grossing Indian films of all time.

Panday will next feature in the action romance film, Beparwah, opposite Sharvari and will reunite with Padda and director Mohit Suri in a yet-untitled musical romance film.

== Filmography ==
Key
| † | Denotes films that have not yet been released |

| Year | Title | Role | Notes | Ref. |
|---|---|---|---|---|
| 2025 | Saiyaara | Krish Kapoor | | |
| 2027 | Beparwah | TBA | Post-production | |
| TBA | Untitled Mohit Suri musical romance † | TBA | Filming | |

== Awards and nominations ==
| Year | Award | Category | Work | Result | Ref. |
|---|---|---|---|---|---|
| 2025 | Bollywood Hungama India Entertainment Awards | Most Iconic Debut of the Year – Male | Saiyaara | Won | |
| 2025 | Bollywood Hungama India Entertainment Awards | Best On-Screen Jodi of the Year (with Aneet Padda) | Saiyaara | Won | |
| 2026 | Zee Cine Awards | Best Male Debut | Saiyaara | Won | |
| 2026 | Screen Awards | Best Male Debut | Saiyaara | Won | |
| 2026 | Indian Film Festival of Melbourne | Best Performance – Male | Saiyaara | Nominated | |
| 2026 | International Indian Film Academy Awards | Star Debut of the Year – Male | Saiyaara | Won | |
| 2026 | News18 Reel Awards | Best Actor – Male | Saiyaara | Nominated | |
| 2026 | News18 Reel Awards | Star of the Year – Male | Saiyaara | Won | |

== See also ==
- List of Indian film actors
