= Zee Cine Award for Best Actor – Female =

Hindi film award

Zee Cine Award for Best Actress
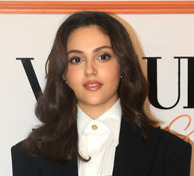
- The 2026 recipient: Aneet Padda
- Awarded for: Best Performance by an Actress in a Leading Role
- Country: India
- Presented by: Zee Entertainment Enterprises
- First award: Madhuri Dixit, Dil To Pagal Hai (1998)
- Currently held by: Aneet Padda, Saiyaara (2026)
- Website: zeecineawards.com

The Zee Cine Award for Best Actor – Female is chosen by the viewers of Zee Entertainment Enterprises as part of its annual award ceremony for Hindi films, to recognise a female actor who has delivered an outstanding performance in a leading role. Following its inception in 1998, the ceremony was not held in 2009 and 2010, but resumed in 2011. The ceremony was again cancelled in 2021 and 2022 due to the COVID-19 pandemic, but it resumed in 2023.

== Superlatives ==
Superlative	Actress	Record
Actress with most awards	Alia Bhatt	4
Actress with most consecutive wins	Alia Bhatt (Note: There was no award ceremony in 2021 and 2022. Bhatt won the award for three consecutive years, from 2018–2020, and again in 2023.) (2018–2020; 2023)	4
Actress with most consecutive nominations	Alia Bhatt (Note: There was no award ceremony in 2021 and 2022. Bhatt received nominations for four consecutive years, from 2017–2020, and again from 2023–2024, resulting in eight nominations, including dual nominations in 2017 and 2023.) (2017–2020; 2023–2024)	8
Actress with most nominations	Deepika Padukone	11
Actress with most nominations without ever winning	Karisma Kapoor	6
Actress with most nominations in a single year	Kajol (1999); Deepika Padukone (2014)	3
Eldest Winner	Shraddha Kapoor (2025)	38 years
Youngest Winner	Aneet Padda (2026)	23 years
Eldest Nominee	Hema Malini (2004)	55 years
Youngest Nominee	Zaira Wasim (2018)	17 years

- Alia Bhatt is the most awarded actress in this category with four wins, followed by Tabu, Aishwarya Rai Bachchan, Rani Mukerji, Vidya Balan and Deepika Padukone, who each have two wins.
- Alia Bhatt is the actress with the most consecutive wins with four, followed by Tabu, Kajol, Rani Mukerji, Vidya Balan, and Deepika Padukone who each have two consecutive wins.
- Deepika Padukone is the actress with the most nominations in this category, with eleven, followed by Kajol with nine, and Kareena Kapoor Khan, Rani Mukerji, and Alia Bhatt with eight nominations each.
- The actress with the most consecutive nominations is Alia Bhatt, who received nominations for six consecutive years.
- Kajol and Deepika Padukone are the actresses who received the most nominations in a single year, with both being nominated for three films in a single year.
- Karisma Kapoor received the most nominations in this category without ever winning, with six, followed by Kriti Sanon with five and Preity Zinta and Katrina Kaif with four nominations each.
- Shraddha Kapoor, who won the award at the age of 38, is the eldest winner, while Hema Malini became the eldest nominee at the age of 55. Aneet Padda is the youngest winner, having received her first award at the age of 23, while Zaira Wasim became the youngest nominee at the age of 17.
- Vidya Balan was the first actress to win the Zee Cine Award for Best Female Debut before winning the award for Best Actress, followed by Deepika Padukone and Aneet Padda. Padda won both awards in the same year for the same film.
- Madhuri Dixit, Tabu, Rani Mukerji, and Anushka Sharma are the four actresses who have won both the Best Actress and Best Supporting Actress awards.
- Aishwarya Rai Bachchan, Vidya Balan, Deepika Padukone, Alia Bhatt and Rani Mukerji are the five actresses who have won both the Best Actress and Best Actress (Critics) awards. Balan, Padukone, and Bhatt won both awards in the same year, with Balan winning for the same film and Padukone and Bhatt winning for two different films.
- Kajol and Tabu are the two actresses who have won both the Best Actress and Best Villain awards.

== Multiple wins ==
The following individuals have received two or more Best Actress awards:

Wins	Actress
4	Alia Bhatt
3	Kajol
2	Tabu, Aishwarya Rai Bachchan, Rani Mukerji, Vidya Balan, Deepika Padukone

== Multiple nominations ==
The following individuals have received two or more Best Actress nominations, including multiple nominations in a single year.

Nominations	Actress
11	Deepika Padukone
9	Kajol, Kareena Kapoor Khan
8	Rani Mukerji, Alia Bhatt
7	Aishwarya Rai Bachchan
6	Karisma Kapoor, Vidya Balan
5	Kriti Sanon
4	Preity Zinta, Tabu, Priyanka Chopra, Anushka Sharma, Katrina Kaif, Shraddha Kapoor
3	Madhuri Dixit, Urmila Matondkar, Kangana Ranaut, Sonam Kapoor, Kiara Advani
2	Juhi Chawla, Sridevi, Taapsee Pannu, Bhumi Pednekar, Yami Gautam, Triptii Dimri

== Winners and nominees ==
Table key
‡	Indicates the winner

=== 1990s ===
Year (Note: Refers to the year in which the ceremony was held.)	Winner	Actor	Role(s)	Film	Ref.
1998 (1st)		Madhuri Dixit ‡	Pooja	Dil To Pagal Hai	
1998 (1st)		Juhi Chawla	Madhu Saxena	Ishq	
1998 (1st)		Kajol	Isha Diwan	Gupt	
1998 (1st)		Karisma Kapoor	Nisha	Dil To Pagal Hai	
1998 (1st)		Karisma Kapoor	Meena Nath Malhotra	Hero No. 1	
1999 (2nd)		Kajol ‡	Anjali Sharma	Kuch Kuch Hota Hai	
1999 (2nd)		Juhi Chawla	Sonia Kapoor	Duplicate	
1999 (2nd)		Kajol	Naina Sehgal & Sonia Sehgal (Twins)	Dushman	
1999 (2nd)		Kajol	Muskaan Thakur	Pyaar Kiya To Darna Kya	
1999 (2nd)		Rani Mukerji	Alisha Mafatlal	Ghulam	

=== 2000s ===
Year	Winner	Actor	Role(s)	Film	Ref.
2000 (3rd)		Aishwarya Rai ‡	Nandini Darbar	Hum Dil De Chuke Sanam	
2000 (3rd)		Aishwarya Rai	Mansi Shankar	Taal	
2000 (3rd)		Kajol	Nandita Rai	Dil Kya Kare	
2000 (3rd)		Kajol	Megha	Hum Aapke Dil Mein Rehte Hain	
2000 (3rd)		Karisma Kapoor	Pooja Mehra (née Makhija)	Biwi No.1	
2001 (4th)		Tabu ‡	Aditi Pandit	Astitva	
2001 (4th)		Aishwarya Rai	Preeti Vyas	Hamara Dil Aapke Paas Hai	
2001 (4th)		Karisma Kapoor	Fiza Ikramullah	Fiza	
2001 (4th)		Madhuri Dixit	Anjali	Pukar	
2001 (4th)		Preity Zinta	Priya Bakshi	Kya Kehna	
2002 (5th)		Tabu ‡	Mumtaz Ali Ansari	Chandni Bar	
2002 (5th)		Ameesha Patel	Sakeena "Sakku" Tara Singh (née Ali)	Gadar: Ek Prem Katha	
2002 (5th)		Kajol	Anjali Sharma Raichand	Kabhi Khushi Kabhie Gham	
2002 (5th)		Karisma Kapoor	Zubeidaa Suleiman Seth / Zubeidaa Mehboob Alam / Rani Meenakshi Devi	Zubeidaa	
2002 (5th)		Nandita Das	Saanvri	Bawandar	
2003 (6th)		Aishwarya Rai ‡	Parvati "Paro"	Devdas	
2003 (6th)		Karisma Kapoor	Nandini	Shakti: The Power	
2003 (6th)		Madhuri Dixit	Chandramukhi	Devdas	
2003 (6th)		Rani Mukerji	Dr. Suhani Sehgal (née Sharma)	Saathiya	
2003 (6th)		Tabu	Rewa Singh	Filhaal...	
2004 (7th)		Urmila Matondkar ‡	Swati	Bhoot	
2004 (7th)		Antara Mali	Chutki	Main Madhuri Dixit Banna Chahti Hoon	
2004 (7th)		Hema Malini	Pooja Malhotra	Baghban	
2004 (7th)		Preity Zinta	Naina Catherine Kapur	Kal Ho Naa Ho	
2004 (7th)		Rani Mukerji	Priya Chopra Mathur	Chalte Chalte	
2005 (8th)		Rani Mukerji ‡	Rhea Prakash	Hum Tum	
2005 (8th)		Kareena Kapoor	Aaliya	Dev	
2005 (8th)		Mallika Sherawat	Simran Sehgal	Murder	
2005 (8th)		Preity Zinta	Zaara Hayaat Khan	Veer-Zaara	
2005 (8th)		Shilpa Shetty	Tamanna Sahni	Phir Milenge	
2005 (8th)		Urmila Matondkar	Sarika Vartak	Ek Hasina Thi	
2006 (9th)		Rani Mukerji ‡	Michelle McNally	Black	
2006 (9th)		Konkona Sen Sharma	Madhavi Sharma	Page 3	
2006 (9th)		Preity Zinta	Ambar "Amby" Malhotra	Salaam Namaste	
2006 (9th)		Rani Mukerji	Vimmi "Babli" Saluja	Bunty Aur Babli	
2006 (9th)		Urmila Matondkar	Trisha Chaudhary	Maine Gandhi Ko Nahin Mara	
2006 (9th)		Vidya Balan	Lalita Roy	Parineeta	
2007 (10th)		Kajol ‡	Zooni Qadri (née Ali Beg)	Fanaa	
2007 (10th)		Aishwarya Rai	Amiran (Umrao Jaan)	Umrao Jaan	
2007 (10th)		Ayesha Takia	Meera	Dor	
2007 (10th)		Bipasha Basu	Nishigandha Dasgupta	Corporate	
2007 (10th)		Kareena Kapoor	Dolly Mishra	Omkara	
2007 (10th)		Rani Mukerji	Maya Talwar	Kabhi Alvida Naa Kehna	
2008 (11th)		Kareena Kapoor ‡	Geet Kaur Dhillon	Jab We Met	
2008 (11th)		Aishwarya Rai	Sujata "Suju" Desai	Guru	
2008 (11th)		Deepika Padukone	Shantipriya aka Shanti & Sandhya "Sandy" Bansal	Om Shanti Om	
2008 (11th)		Katrina Kaif	Jasmeet "Jazz" Malhotra Singh	Namastey London	
2008 (11th)		Tabu	Nina Verma	Cheeni Kum	
2008 (11th)		Vidya Balan	Avni Chaturvedi / Manjulika	Bhool Bhulaiyaa	
2009	Not held				

=== 2010s ===
Year	Winner	Actor	Role(s)	Film	Ref.
2010	Not held				
2011 (12th)		Vidya Balan ‡	Krishna Verma	Ishqiya	
2011 (12th)		Aishwarya Rai Bachchan	Sofia D'Souza	Guzaarish	
2011 (12th)		Anushka Sharma	Shruti Kakkar	Band Baaja Baaraat	
2011 (12th)		Deepika Padukone	Aaliya Khan	Break Ke Baad	
2011 (12th)		Kajol	Mandira Khan (née Rathore)	My Name Is Khan	
2011 (12th)		Kareena Kapoor	Daboo	Golmaal 3	
2011 (12th)		Katrina Kaif	Indu Pratap (née Seksaria)	Raajneeti	
2012 (13th)		Vidya Balan ‡	Reshma / Silk	The Dirty Picture	
2012 (13th)		Kangana Ranaut	Tanuja Trivedi a.k.a. "Tanu"	Tanu Weds Manu	
2012 (13th)		Kareena Kapoor	Divya Rana / Chhaya	Bodyguard	
2012 (13th)		Katrina Kaif	Laila	Zindagi Na Milegi Dobara	
2012 (13th)		Priyanka Chopra	Susanna Anna-Marie Johannes (also known as Saheb, Suzi, Sultana, Anna and Sunaina)	7 Khoon Maaf	
2013 (14th)		Priyanka Chopra ‡	Jhilmil Chatterjee	Barfi	
2013 (14th)		Deepika Padukone	Veronica Malaney	Cocktail	
2013 (14th)		Kareena Kapoor	Rosie / Simran	Talaash: The Answer Lies Within	
2013 (14th)		Sridevi	Shashi Godbole	English Vinglish	
2013 (14th)		Vidya Balan	Vidya Bagchi	Kahaani	
2014 (15th)		Deepika Padukone ‡	Meenalochni "Meenamma" Azhagusundaram	Chennai Express	
2014 (15th)		Deepika Padukone	Leela Sanera	Goliyon Ki Raasleela Ram-Leela	
2014 (15th)		Deepika Padukone	Naina Talwar	Yeh Jawaani Hai Deewani	
2014 (15th)		Parineeti Chopra	Gayatri	Shuddh Desi Romance	
2014 (15th)		Shraddha Kapoor	Aarohi Shirke	Aashiqui 2	
2014 (15th)		Sonam Kapoor	Zoya Haider	Raanjhanaa	
2016 (16th)		Deepika Padukone ‡	Mastani	Bajirao Mastani	
2016 (16th)		Anushka Sharma	Meera	NH10	
2016 (16th)		Deepika Padukone	Piku Banerjee	Piku	
2016 (16th)		Kangana Ranaut	Tanuja "Tanu" Sharma / Kusum "Datto" Sangwan	Tanu Weds Manu: Returns	
2016 (16th)		Priyanka Chopra	Kashibai	Bajirao Mastani	
2016 (16th)		Priyanka Chopra	Ayesha Mehra	Dil Dhadakne Do	
2017 (Note: Held on 11 March 2017.) (17th)		Anushka Sharma ‡	Aarfa Ali Khan (née Hussain)	Sultan	
2017 (17th)		Alia Bhatt	Kaira	Dear Zindagi	
2017 (17th)		Alia Bhatt	Bauria a.k.a. Mary Jane	Udta Punjab	
2017 (17th)		Fatima Sana Shaikh	Geeta Phogat	Dangal	
2017 (17th)		Sonam Kapoor	Neerja Bhanot	Neerja	
2017 (17th)		Taapsee Pannu	Minal Arora	Pink	
2018 (Note: Held on 19 December 2017.) (18th)		Alia Bhatt ‡	Vaidehi Trivedi	Badrinath Ki Dulhania	
2018 (18th)		Bhumi Pednekar	Jaya Sharma (née Joshi)	Toilet: Ek Prem Katha	
2018 (18th)		Kriti Sanon	Bitti Mishra	Bareilly Ki Barfi	
2018 (18th)		Sridevi	Devki Sabarwal	Mom	
2018 (18th)		Vidya Balan	Sulochana "Sulu" Dubey	Tumhari Sulu	
2018 (18th)		Zaira Wasim	Insia Malik	Secret Superstar	
2019 (19th)		Alia Bhatt ‡	Sehmat Syed (née Khan)	Raazi	
2019 (19th)		Anushka Sharma	Mamta Sharma	Sui Dhaaga	
2019 (19th)		Deepika Padukone	Padmavati	Padmaavat	
2019 (19th)		Kareena Kapoor	Kalindi Puri	Veere Di Wedding	
2019 (19th)		Sonam Kapoor	Avni Sharma	Veere Di Wedding	
2019 (19th)		Taapsee Pannu	Advocate Aarti Malhotra	Mulk	

=== 2020s ===
Year	Winner	Actor	Role(s)	Film	Ref.
2020 (20th)		Alia Bhatt ‡	Safeena Firdausi	Gully Boy	
2020 (20th)		Kareena Kapoor	Deepti Batra	Good Newwz	
2020 (20th)		Kiara Advani	Dr. Preeti Sikka	Kabir Singh	
2020 (20th)		Kriti Sanon	Rashmi Trivedi	Luka Chuppi	
2020 (20th)		Rakul Preet Singh	Ayesha Khurana	De De Pyaar De	
2020 (20th)		Shraddha Kapoor	Maya Sharma	Chhichhore	
2021	Not held				
2022	Not held				
2023 (21st)		Alia Bhatt ‡	Badrunissa Sheikh	Darlings	
2023 (21st)		Alia Bhatt	Gangubai Kathiawadi	Gangubai Kathiawadi	
2023 (21st)		Bhumi Pednekar	Sumi Singh	Badhaai Do	
2023 (21st)		Deepika Padukone	Alisha Khanna	Gehraiyaan	
2023 (21st)		Kiara Advani	Reet Thakur	Bhool Bhulaiyaa 2	
2023 (21st)		Kriti Sanon	Dr. Anika	Bhediya	
2024 (22nd)		Kiara Advani ‡	Katha Kapadia	Satyaprem Ki Katha	
2024 (22nd)		Alia Bhatt	Rani Chatterjee	Rocky Aur Rani Kii Prem Kahaani	
2024 (22nd)		Deepika Padukone	Rubina "Rubai" Mohsin	Pathaan	
2024 (22nd)		Shraddha Kapoor	Nisha "Tinni" Malhotra	Tu Jhoothi Main Makkaar	
2024 (22nd)		Rani Mukerji	Debika Chatterjee	Mrs. Chatterjee vs Norway	
2024 (22nd)		Nayanthara	Narmada Rai	Jawan	
2025 (23rd)		Shraddha Kapoor ‡	Unnamed	Stree 2	
2025 (23rd)		Kriti Sanon	Sifra	Teri Baaton Mein Aisa Uljha Jiya	
2025 (23rd)		Triptii Dimri	Saloni Bagga	Bad Newz	
2025 (23rd)		Kareena Kapoor	Jasmine Kohli	Crew	
2025 (23rd)		Yami Gautam	Zooni Haksar	Article 370	
2025 (23rd)		Katrina Kaif	Maria	Merry Christmas	
2026 (24th)		Aneet Padda ‡	Vaani Batra	Saiyaara	
2026 (24th)		Yami Gautam	Shazia Bano	Haq	
2026 (24th)		Kangana Ranaut	Indira Gandhi	Emergency	
2026 (24th)		Triptii Dimri	Vidhi Bharadwaj	Dhadak 2	
2026 (24th)		Kriti Sanon	Mukti Beniwal	Tere Ishk Mein	
2026 (24th)		Sonam Bajwa	Adaa Randhawa	Ek Deewane Ki Deewaniyat	

== See also ==
- Zee Cine Awards
- Bollywood
- Cinema of India
