= Baar Baar Dekho =

2016 Indian film by Nitya Mehra

- Theatrical release poster
- Directed by: Nitya Mehra
- Screenplay by: Nitya Mehra; Sri Rao; Anuvab Pal
- Dialogues by: Anvita Dutt Guptan
- Story by: Sri Rao
- Produced by: Hiroo Yash Johar (Note: While promotional material lists Sidhwani, Karan and Akhtar as producers, Hiroo is credited directly in the film); Karan Johar; Ritesh Sidhwani; Farhan Akhtar
- Starring: Katrina Kaif; Sidharth Malhotra
- Cinematography: Ravi K. Chandran
- Edited by: Amitabh Shukla
- Music by: Score: Sameer Uddin; Songs: Amaal Mallik; Arko Pravo Mukherjee; Badshah; Bilal Saeed; Jasleen Royal; Prem-Hardeep
- Production companies: Dharma Productions; Excel Entertainment
- Distributed by: Eros International
- Release date: 9 September 2016
- Running time: 141 minutes
- Country: India
- Language: Hindi
- Box office: ₹62.670 crore

Baar Baar Dekho (transl. Look again and again) is a 2016 Indian Hindi-language science-fiction romantic drama film directed by Nitya Mehra in her Hindi film debut. It is produced by Karan Johar and Farhan Akhtar under Dharma Productions and Excel Entertainment respectively. The film stars Katrina Kaif and Sidharth Malhotra with Ram Kapoor and Sarika playing supporting roles.

The film was released in India on 9 September 2016 worldwide and grossed ₹626.7 million against a production budget of ₹530 million becoming an average success at box office.

== Plot ==
Diya Kapoor and Jai Varma are childhood sweethearts. Jai is a mathematics professor and Diya an artist. While Jai hopes to get a fellowship at Cambridge University, Diya wishes for them to get married. Jai reluctantly agrees to marry her but changes his mind because of the thought of the seven vows and the many rituals, as well as the fear of divorce. Jai protests that these rituals are meaningless and talks negatively about his wedding. He tells Diya that he has other plans for his bright future and she may not be a part of it. She walks away heartbroken. Jai gets drunk and passes out only to wake up in Thailand on his honeymoon. He discovers that it's been ten days since he married Diya, but he has no memory of it.

In 2018, Jai wakes up in Cambridge, finding Diya about to deliver their child. He discovers that it has been two years since his marriage, and realizes that he has been time traveling and has no control over it.

The next morning, Jai wakes up in 2034, and is a professor at Cambridge University. It has been eighteen years since his marriage, but his horror, Jai realizes that it is the day when he and Diya are divorced. Heartbroken, he returns home and pleads to return to the past to set things right.

Jai wakes up the next day, in 2023, realizing he is in the past, seven years after his marriage. He juggles between taking care of his family and career. However, Jai gives more priority to work and instead of going to Diya's first art exhibition, and he goes to his friend Chitra's place to help her with her breakup, where Chitra tries to seduce Jai. Believing it to be the cause of his divorce, Jai hastily returns home, but his family is unhappy with him.

Jai remains convinced that he has set things right. The next day, he wakes up in 2047 to find himself 60 years old. He finds out that his mother has died and everyone has gathered for her funeral. After the funeral, Jai is shocked that he and Diya are still divorced and that Diya has married art gallery owner Nikhil Khanna, her show opener, who enjoys the love of Jai's mother and children.

Reeling from this blow, Jai comes across the priest who had conducted his marriage, who warns him of the importance of time. Jai is given another opportunity to set things right as he goes back to 2023 on time to the same day, seven years after his marriage. This time, he sets things right. He spends time with his children, does his work well and makes Diya feel special, and attends her art exhibition. At the end of the day, Jai is a happy man.

Jai wakes up back into the present, the day after he argued with Diya about his life and his career, got drunk, and began the long mental voyage into his future while. Jai rushes back to Diya, cherishing every moment along the way, also glad to see his mother again. Jai reconciles with Diya and promises to be true to her. The film ends with them marrying and everyone dancing.

== Cast ==
- Katrina Kaif as Diya Kapoor
  - Tunisha Sharma as Young Diya Kapoor
- Sidharth Malhotra as Jai Varma
  - Jason Dsouza as Young Jai
- Sayani Gupta as Chitra
- Kirti Adarkar as Suman
- Taaha Shah as Tarun Varma
- Rohan Joshi as Raj
- Rajit Kapur as Panditji (special appearance)
- Ram Kapoor as Vinod Kapoor, Diya's father
- Sarika as Varsha Varma, Jai's mother
- Sagar Arya as Nikhil Khanna, Diya's second husband in the flash-forward

== Production ==
=== Development ===
In October 2013, it was announced that Nitya Mehra, assistant director to films Life of Pi and The Reluctant Fundamentalist, would be making her directorial debut with Excel Entertainment on their new project. Aamir Khan and Deepika Padukone were initially attached, but both eventually left the project. Anushka Sharma was also offered the female lead but she turned it down as well. In September 2014, it was officially announced that the film will be co-produced by Karan Johar of Dharma Productions and with Sidharth Malhotra as the male lead. Later in April 2015, Katrina Kaif was confirmed to feature in the film, opposite Malhotra. The film was initially titled Kal Jisne Dekha.

=== Filming ===
Principal photography began on 28 August 2015, in Glasgow, Scotland, and went for over a month. Filming then continued in Delhi and Mumbai from November 2015 onwards. On 22 February 2016, the team filmed "Sau Aasmaan" in Krabi, Thailand, for a week.

=== Budget ===
According to Box Office India, the film had a total budget of ₹530 million (equivalent to ₹830 million or US$8.6 million in 2026). However, The Indian Express stated that budget was around ₹350 million (equivalent to ₹550 million or US$5.7 million in 2026) excluding the cost of printing & marketing which are generally not considered part of the budget.

== Soundtrack ==
Baar Baar Dekho

Soundtrack album by Amaal Mallik, Arko, Badshah, Jasleen Royal, Bilal Saeed and Prem Hardeep
- Released: 2 August 2016
- Genre: Feature film soundtrack
- Length: 21:12
- Language: Hindi
- Label: Zee Music Company

Distributed and released by Zee Music Company in its first of a string of collaborations with Excel Entertainment, the soundtrack of Baar Baar Dekho is composed by Amaal Mallik, Arko, Badshah, Jasleen Royal, Bilal Saeed, and Prem-Hardeep, making it the first Excel Entertainment production to feature a multi-composer soundtrack. The sixth song "Kala Chashma", a recreation of an earlier Punjabi song, was released on 27 July 2016, marking the beginning of the film's promotional run.

Track listing
No.	Title	Lyrics	Music	Singer(s)	Length
1.	"Kho Gaye Hum Kahan"	Prateek Kuhad	Jasleen Royal	Jasleen Royal, Prateek Kuhad	3:33
2.	"Sau Aasmaan"	Kumaar	Amaal Mallik	Armaan Malik, Neeti Mohan	3:54
3.	"Dariya"	Arko	Arko	Arko	3:38
4.	"Nachde Ne Saare"	Aditya Sharma	Jasleen Royal	Jasleen Royal, Harshdeep Kaur, Siddharth Mahadevan	3:14
5.	"Teri Khair Mangdi"	Kumaar, Bilal Saeed	Bilal Saeed	Bilal Saeed	3:45
6.	"Kala Chashma"	Amrik Singh, Kumaar	Prem Hardeep, Badshah	Amar Arshi, Badshah, Neha Kakkar	3:07
Total length:					21:12

== Release ==
=== Certification issue ===
In August 2016, the film was granted a U/A certificate by the Central Board of Film Certification (CBFC). However, the examining committee of the board asked the producers to remove two visuals from the film which involved sequences depicting an actor wearing a brassiere and another referencing Savita Bhabhi, a popular Indian pornographic cartoon character.

=== Promotion ===
Zee Music Company, in its first collaboration with Eros International and Excel Entertainment, and second with Dharma Productions after Shaandaar, released countdown teasers to the song "Kala Chashma", a recreation of the hit Punjabi dance number "Kala Chachma", which was released on 27 July 2016, with the music video announcing the impending release of the trailer. Excel Entertainment later uploaded a motion poster revealing the trailer release date and a round table discussion involving Ritesh Sidhwani, Johar, Akhtar, Mehra, Malhotra and Kaif to formally initiate the promotional run, a first-of-its-kind instance in Hindi cinema.

== Reception ==
=== Box office ===
Baar Baar Dekho released alongside Sohail Khan's sports romantic comedy Freaky Ali and collected ₹68.1 million (equivalent to ₹110 million or US$1.1 million in 2026) on its opening day in India beating Freaky Ali's ₹25.5 million (equivalent to ₹40 million or US$420,000 in 2026). On the second day, the film showed growth in its occupancy and collected ₹76.5 million (equivalent to ₹120 million or US$1.2 million in 2026) before its breakdown on the third day where it collected ₹67 million (equivalent to ₹110 million or US$1.1 million in 2026) and reached the first weekend collection of ₹211.6 million (equivalent to ₹330 million or US$3.4 million in 2026). The film then started its break down as it collected ₹83.4 million (equivalent to ₹130 million or US$1.4 million in 2026) in the next four days and with that the film made its first collection of ₹295 million (equivalent to ₹460 million or US$4.8 million in 2026). In the second week it collected ₹17.5 million (equivalent to ₹27 million or US$290,000 in 2026) and then ₹600,000 (equivalent to ₹940,000 or US$9,800 in 2026) and ₹200,000 (equivalent to ₹310,000 or US$3,300 in 2026) in the third and fourth week, respectively. The film's net collection was ₹312.4 million (equivalent to ₹490 million or US$5.1 million in 2026) while its grossing in India was ₹433.9 million (equivalent to ₹680 million or US$7.1 million in 2026).

The film showed impressive grossing internationally collecting ₹65.4 million (equivalent to ₹100 million or US$1.1 million in 2026), ₹29.9 million (equivalent to ₹47 million or US$490,000 in 2026), and ₹26.7 million (equivalent to ₹42 million or US$430,000 in 2026) from North America (USA & Canada), UK, and UAE, respectively. The film also collected ₹5 million (equivalent to ₹7.8 million or US$81,000 in 2026) from Pakistan, ₹9.1 million (equivalent to ₹14 million or US$150,000 in 2026) from Australia, and ₹2.8 million (equivalent to ₹4.4 million or US$46,000 in 2026) from New Zealand.

=== Critical response ===
Rediff.com gave the film 1 out 5, calling it "catastrophically stupid," and commenting that "a feeble script is built on constant, relentless revelations with artlessly expository dialogues." Subhash K. Jha from NDTV gave the movie 4/5, and mentioned that there "is plenty to celebrate in Baar Baar Dekho, not the least of its virtues being the ability to deliver marital home truths without sermons or soliloquies." Writing for The Hindu, Namrata Joshi commented that the movie features "passionless performances and cardboard characters" that lack depth. "There are no standout performances, no scenes that can pack in an emotional wallop and the conversational dialogue turns banal beyond a point." The Indian Express gave the movie 1.5 out of 5, noting that "Katrina Kaif's limited emoting abilities, Sidharth Malhotra's one-note performance, and a banal script" make watching the film once "way more than enough." India Today criticized the performance of the lead actors in the film: "Katrina Kaif and Sidharth Malhotra both seem to think they are in the film to make it look good. There's hardly any acting on the part of either. While Katrina's moments of frustration and sorrow invoke the stray laugh from the theatre, Sidharth's neither-here-nor-there Jai hardly makes an impact."

=== Accolades ===
Year	Award	Category	Recipients	Result
2017	Filmfare Awards	Best Female Playback Singer	Neeti Mohan for "Sau Aasmaan"	Nominated
2017	Stardust Awards	Best Female Playback Singer	Neeti Mohan for "Sau Aasmaan"	Nominated
2017	Zee Cine Awards	Best Choreography	Bosco-Caesar for "Kala Chashma"	Won
2017	Mirchi Music Awards	Upcoming Male Vocalist of The Year	Arko Pravo Mukherjee for "Dariya"	Nominated

== Legacy ==
Despite its failure upon release, Baar Baar Dekho has, over later years, developed a strong fan following primarily due to the chemistry between Malhotra and Kaif, the message and the soundtrack, and served as an inspiration for other works. The Australian romantic comedy Long Story Short (2021) is loosely based on the film and was itself remade in Italian as Still Time (2022).

The song "Kho Gaye Hum Kahan" later served as the title for a 2023 coming-of-age drama film also produced by Sidhwani and Akhtar under Excel Entertainment and written by Tiger Baby Films founders and producers Reema Kagti and Zoya Akhtar alongside debutant director Arjun Varain Singh.
