= Aneet Padda =

Indian actress (born 2002)

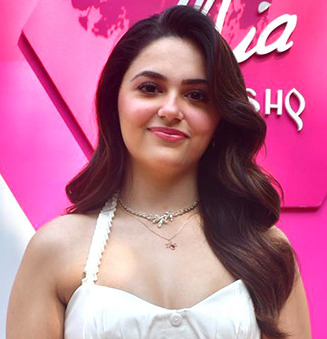
- Padda in 2026
- Born: 13 October 2002 (age 24); Amritsar, Punjab, India
- Education: Jesus and Mary College
- Occupations: Actress; model
- Years active: 2022–present

Aneet Kaur Padda (born 13 October 2002) is an Indian actress who works in Hindi films and series. She began her career with a brief role in the drama Salaam Venky (2022) and had her first lead role in the Amazon Prime Video series Big Girls Don't Cry (2024). Her breakthrough came with her role as a songwriter diagnosed with early-onset Alzheimer's in Mohit Suri's romantic drama Saiyaara (2025), which earned her wider recognition and several accolades for Best Actress. She has since earned praise for her performance as a survivor of sexual assault in the drama Hunkkaar: The Roar (2026).

== Early life and education ==
Padda was born on 13 October 2002 in Amritsar, Punjab, India. She completed her schooling from the Spring Dale Senior School in Amritsar. Padda has a bachelor's degree, majoring in political science with a minor in English from the Jesus and Mary College of the University of Delhi.

As a child, Padda featured in a play that kindled her interest in acting, having not previously been particularly interested in cinema. She has recalled a lack of support from her father, who had once aspired to be an actor himself. During the COVID-19 pandemic, Padda said she had sent over 50 cold emails to production companies in an effort to secure work, but soon realised that this was typically handled by casting agencies. She was subsequently hired for a coffee advertisement.

While studying for her undergraduate degree in Delhi, Padda began modelling in advertisements, dividing her time between Mumbai and Chandigarh for professional commitments and Delhi for her studies, with one of her earliest assignments being a textile ad shot in Chandigarh.

== Career ==
Padda began her acting career with a brief role in Salaam Venky (2022), a drama about euthanasia in which she played the love interest of Vishal Jethwa's character. The Hindu's Shilpa Nair was appreciative of her appearance in the film. In 2024, Padda had her first lead role in Nitya Mehra's Amazon Prime Video series Big Girls Don't Cry, a coming-of-age drama centred around a friend group who attend a boarding school. She played Roohi, a member of the group struggling to cope with the strained relationship between her parents. Padda wrote, composed and sang an original track for the series, titled "Masoom". Despite disliking the series, a critic for The New Indian Express found Padda and her co-star Afrah Sayed to be the highlights among the ensemble. Padda has since credited Mehra for her support when she moved from Delhi to Mumbai to pursue a career in acting.

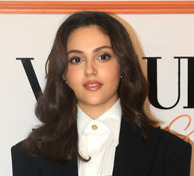
Padda in 2026

In 2025, she first appeared alongside Dalai Mulchandani in Mehra's segment of the anthology series Yuva Sapno Ka Safar, which was digitally released on to Waves. Following this, Padda had her breakthrough with Mohit Suri's romantic drama Saiyaara, in which she starred opposite debutant Ahaan Panday. Suri was initially impressed by Padda's self-tape audition, but found her first formal audition lacking in authenticity. However, he was persuaded by Panday to give her a second opportunity after which she was ultimately cast as Vaani, an aspiring lyricist diagnosed with early-onset Alzheimer's, who forms a relationship with an emerging singer (played by Panday). In a positive review of the film, The Hollywood Reporter India's Rahul Desai commended Padda for bringing "a kind of literary sheen to a woman that might have easily been reduced to a coming-of-age device in someone else's journey" and praised the chemistry between her and Panday. Saiyaara set several box-office records upon its release, grossing over ₹5.79 billion (US$62 million) to emerge as the year's fourth highest-grossing Indian film.

The following year, Padda reunited with Nitya Mehta for her socio-thriller drama Hunkkaar: The Roar (2026), which centres on a young girl who accuses a powerful godman (played by Raghubir Yadav) of sexual assault. Completed in 2023, the project remained without a distributor until JioHotstar acquired it after the newfound fame Padda attained from Saiyaara. Her performance received critical acclaim. Shweta Keshri of India Today considered Padda's restrained and mature handling of a "difficult role" to be the series' prime asset. She will next star in the titular role in Shakti Shalini, part of the Maddock Horror Comedy Universe, and reunite with Suri and Panday in an as-yet-untitled musical romance.

== Media image ==
Following the success of Saiyaara (2025), Padda was announced as a celebrity ambassador for several brands, including Lakmé Cosmetics, Mia by Tanishq, Reliance Trends and Pepsi. In 2026, Padda was featured by Forbes India in their 30 Under 30 list.

== Filmography ==
Key
| † | Denotes films that have not yet been released |

=== Films ===
| Year | Title | Role | Notes | Ref. |
|---|---|---|---|---|
| 2022 | Salaam Venky | Nandini | Debut film | |
| 2025 | Saiyaara | Vaani Batra | | |
| 2027 | Shakti Shalini † | TBA | Post-production | |
| TBA | Untitled Mohit Suri musical romance film † | TBA | Filming | |

=== Television ===
| Year | Title | Role | Notes | Ref. |
|---|---|---|---|---|
| 2024 | Big Girls Don't Cry | Roohi Ahuja | Prime Video series | |
| 2025 | Yuva Sapno Ka Safar | Harleen | Credited as Aneet Kaur; Segment: "Khatti Meethi Yaadein" | |
| 2026 | Hunkkaar: The Roar | Meenu Rawat | Credited as Aneet Kaur Padda | |

== Discography ==
| Year | Album | Song | Ref. |
|---|---|---|---|
| 2024 | Big Girls Don't Cry | "Masoom" | |

== Awards and nominations ==
| Year | Award | Category | Work | Result | Notes | Ref. |
|---|---|---|---|---|---|---|
| 2024 | Filmfare OTT Awards | Best Original Soundtrack in a Series | Big Girls Don't Cry | Nominated | Shared with Amit Trivedi, Rahul Pais, Nariman Khambata, Kanishk Seth, Shashwat Sachdev, Tarana Marwah and Gaurav Raina. | |
| 2025 | CNN-News18 Indian of the Year Awards | GenZ Icon Award | —N/a | Won | Along with Ahaan Panday | |
| 2025 | Bollywood Hungama India Entertainment Awards | Most Iconic Debut of the Year – Female | Saiyaara | Won | | |
| 2025 | Bollywood Hungama India Entertainment Awards | Best On-Screen Jodi of the Year | Saiyaara | Won | Along with Ahaan Panday | |
| 2026 | Zee Cine Awards | Best Actor – Female (Jury) | Saiyaara | Nominated | | |
| 2026 | Zee Cine Awards | Viewers’ Choice – Best Actor – Female | Saiyaara | Won | | |
| 2026 | Zee Cine Awards | Best Debut (Female) | Saiyaara | Won | | |
| 2026 | CNN-News18 Showsha Reel Awards 2026 | Star of the Year (Female) | Saiyaara | Won | | |
| 2026 | Pinkvilla Screen and Style Icons Awards | Best Debut (Female) | Saiyaara | Won | | |
| 2026 | Screen Awards | Breakthrough New Actor (Female) | Saiyaara | Won | | |
| 2026 | Indian Film Festival of Melbourne | Best Performance (Female) | Saiyaara | Nominated | | |
| 2026 | International Indian Film Academy Awards | Best Actress (Leading Role) | Saiyaara | Won | | |

== See also ==
- List of Indian film actresses
