= Zee Cine Award for Best Male Debut =

Film award in India

Zee Cine Awards for Best Male Debut
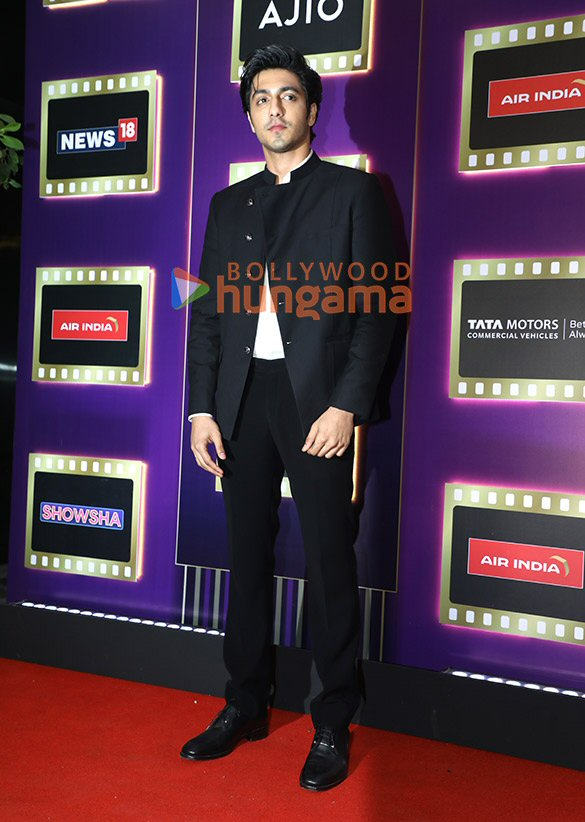
- The 2026 recipient: Ahaan Panday
- Awarded for: Best Performance by an Actor in a Debut Role
- Country: India
- Presented by: Zee Entertainment
- First award: Akshay Khanna; Border (1998)
- Currently held by: Ahaan Panday; Saiyaara (2026)
- Website: Zee Cine Awards

The Zee Cine Award for Best Male Debut is chosen by the jury members in the annual Zee Cine Awards. They give awards to the new discoveries of Bollywood where they see some potential. This Category was first awarded in the year 1998. The first recipient was Akshay Khanna for his performance in Border. The most recent receipt is Ahaan Panday for Saiyaara.

== Winners ==
Year	Winner	Film
1998	Akshaye Khanna	Border
1999	Mukesh Tiwari	China Gate
2000	Aftab Shivdasani	Mast
2001	Hrithik Roshan	Kaho Naa... Pyaar Hai
2002	Tusshar Kapoor	Mujhe Kuch Kehna Hai
2003	Vivek Oberoi	Company
2004	Shahid Kapoor	Ishq Vishk
2005	Not Awarded	
2006	Shiney Ahuja	Hazaaron Khwaishein Aisi
2007	Upen Patel	36 China Town
2008	Ranbir Kapoor	Saawariya
2009	Not Held	
2010	Not Held	
2011	Ranveer Singh	Band Baaja Baaraat
2012	Rana Daggubati	Dum Maaro Dum
2013	Arjun Kapoor; Ayushmann Khurana	Ishaqzaade; Vicky Donor
2014	Dhanush	Raanjhanaa
2015	Tiger Shroff	Heropanti
2016	Vicky Kaushal	Masaan
2017	Jim Sarbh	Neerja
2018	Matin Rey Tangu	Tubelight
2019	Ishaan Khattar	Beyond the Clouds & Dhadak
2020	Siddhant Chaturvedi; Vishal Jethwa	Gully Boy; Mardaani 2
2021	Not Held	
2022	Not Held	
2023	Babil Khan	Qala
2024	Rajveer Deol	Dono
2025	Abhay Verma; Lakshya	Munjya; Kill
2026	Ahaan Panday	Saiyaara

== See also ==
- Zee Cine Awards
- Bollywood
- Cinema of India
