= Amar Arshi =

Punjabi singer

- Born: 15 January 1967 (age 59); Phagwara, Punjab, India
- Occupation: Punjabi singer
- Years active: 1991 – present

Amar Arshi is an Indian singer. He was born in Phagwara, Punjab as Amarjit Singh. Currently, he is based out of London. His first album was released in 1991. His songs include "Aaja Ni Aaja", " Kaala Chasma" and "Rangli Kothi". "Kala Chashma" was remixed for a Bollywood movie Baar Baar Dekho (2016).

== Discography ==
Famous for his energetic and catchy Punjabi songs such as "Pehli Mulakat," "Mulakataan," "Chhedi Na," "Mitte Ber Wargi Mainu," "Vairne," "Din Bichhahan de," "Haye O Rabba," "Gerhe Te Gerha," "Maiya de Navrate," "Gabru," "Naa Chalda," and many more, recognition has been garnered by Amar Arshi for his contributions to the Punjabi music genre. His powerful vocals, vibrant music, and the ability to infuse bhangra music with modern beats, along with his collaborations with top Punjabi artists, are well-known attributes.

=== Albums ===
Year	Album	Co-singer(s)	Notes
1991	Kala Chashma		
2002	Aaja Ni Aaja		
2006	Rangli Kothi		
2009	Naa Chalda		
