= Zee Cine Award for Best Director =

Cinema award in India

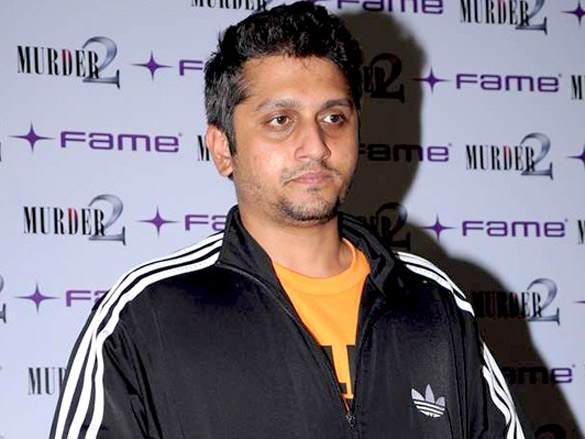
- The 2026 recipient: Mohit Suri for Saiyaara
- Awarded for: Best Director
- Country: India
- Presented by: Zee Entertainment Enterprises
- First award: J. P. Dutta, Border (1998)
- Currently held by: Mohit Suri, Saiyaara (2026)

The Zee Cine Award for Best Director is an annual award presented by Zee Entertainment Enterprises to recognize outstanding directorial achievement in Hindi cinema. Part of the broader Zee Cine Awards ceremony that honors excellence in Bollywood films, this category celebrates directors who have demonstrated exceptional skill in filmmaking during the eligible year. The award is determined through public voting by audiences across India, with winners typically announced in March during the annual awards ceremony.

== Multiple wins ==
Wins	Recipient
5	Sanjay Leela Bhansali
2	Rakesh Roshan, Karan Johar, Ayan Mukerji

== Awards ==
The winners are listed below:

Year	Director	Film
1998	J.P. Dutta	Border
1999	Karan Johar	Kuch Kuch Hota Hai
2000	Sanjay Leela Bhansali	Hum Dil De Chuke Sanam
2001	Rakesh Roshan	Kaho Naa... Pyaar Hai
2002	Ashutosh Gowariker	Lagaan
2003	Sanjay Leela Bhansali	Devdas
2004	Rakesh Roshan	Koi... Mil Gaya
2005	Yash Chopra	Veer-Zaara
2006	Sanjay Leela Bhansali	Black
2007	Rakeysh Omprakash Mehra	Rang De Basanti
2008	Aamir Khan	Taare Zameen Par (Like Stars on Earth)
2011	Karan Johar	My Name is Khan
2012	Imtiaz Ali	Rockstar
2013	Anurag Basu	Barfi!
2014	Ayan Mukerji	Yeh Jawaani Hai Deewani
2016	Sanjay Leela Bhansali	Bajirao Mastani
2017	Ram Madhvani	Neerja
2018	Ashwiny Iyer Tiwari	Bareilly Ki Barfi
2019	Sanjay Leela Bhansali	Padmaavat
2020	Zoya Akhtar	Gully Boy
2023	Ayan Mukerji	Brahmāstra: Part One – Shiva
2024	Atlee	Jawan
2025	Amar Kaushik	Stree 2
2025	Kiran Rao	Laapataa Ladies
2026	Mohit Suri	Saiyaara

== See also ==
- Zee Cine Awards
- Bollywood
- Cinema of India
