= Tere Ishk Mein (soundtrack) =

Soundtrack album by A. R. Rahman
- Released: 11 November 2025
- Recorded: 2024–2025
- Studios: Panchathan Record Inn and AM Studios, Chennai; Panchathan Record Inn, Mumbai; Krimson Avenue Studios, Chennai; UNO Records, Chennai
- Genre: Feature film soundtrack
- Length: 39:53
- Language: Hindi
- Label: T-Series
- Producer: A. R. Rahman

A. R. Rahman chronology
Ufff Yeh Siyapaa (2025)	Tere Ishk Mein (2025)	Baab (2026)
External audio
- Tere Ishq Mein – Official Audio Jukebox on YouTube

Singles from Tere Ishk Mein
- 1. "Tere Ishk Mein" Released: 18 October 2025; 2. "Usey Kehna" Released: 3 November 2025

Tere Ishk Mein is the soundtrack album composed by A. R. Rahman to the 2025 Hindi-language musical romantic drama film of the same name directed by Aanand L. Rai and produced by Colour Yellow Productions and T-Series Films, starring Dhanush and Kriti Sanon. The album featured nine songs with lyrics written by Irshad Kamil and Dhanush. It was preceded by two singles—"Tere Ishk Mein" and "Usey Kehna"—before the album's release on 12 November 2025 under the T-Series label. The track "Aawaara Angara" (Hindi)/"Uyiraare Uyiraare" (Tamil)/"Naa Praanam" (Telugu) is loosely based on Raga Shivaranjani

== Background ==
The film's soundtrack was composed by A. R. Rahman, in his third collaboration with Rai after Raanjhanaa (2013) and Atrangi Re (2021), and fifth collaboration with Dhanush after Raanjhanaa, Maryan (2013), Atrangi Re and Raayan (2024). Irshad Kamil wrote lyrics for the songs. During the making of the film, Rai praised Rahman on his ability to understand the narrative through music.

The album featured contributions from Arijit Singh, Shilpa Rao, Darshan Raval, Sukhwinder Singh and Shankar Mahadevan. Rahman introduced Nitish Aher as a singer through "Usey Kehna", a piano ballad duet with Jonita Gandhi. Rahman recalled that the song was inspired by his travel to Himachal Pradesh, witnessing the reflection of the mountains in Ganges. Discussing with Rai and screenwriter Himanshu Sharma, he crafted a ballad occupied by piano and strings. The song "Aawaara Angaara" is performed by Faheem Abdullah, who was known for his title track for Saiyaara.

== Release ==
The first song from the album, the title track "Tere Ishk Mein", was released as a single on 18 October 2025. The second song "Usey Kehna" was released on 2 November 2025. The film's music launch event was held at Film City, Mumbai on 12 November. It saw the presence of the cast and crew in attendance, with Rahman conducting a musical performance of the film's songs with Dhanush. The album was released on the same date.

== Track listing ==
All tracks are written by Irshad Kamil except where noted.

Hindi
No.	Title	Singer(s)	Length
1.	"Tere Ishk Mein"	Arijit Singh	5:50
2.	"Usey Kehna"	Nitesh Aher, Jonita Gandhi	4:58
3.	"Aawaara Angaara"	Faheem Abdullah	5:11
4.	"Deewaana Deewaana"	A. R. Rahman	5:37
5.	"Tere Zikr Mein"	Shilpa Rao	3:31
6.	"Jigar Thanda" (Male)	Darshan Raval	3:33
7.	"Ladki Jaisi"	Sukhwinder Singh	3:39
8.	"Chinnaware" (Lyrics:Dhanush)	Shankar Mahadevan	3:03
9.	"Jigar Thanda" (Female)	Shilpa Rao, Amina Rafiq, Adithya RK	4:31
Total length:			39:53

Tamil
No.	Title	Lyrics	Singer(s)	Length
1.	"O Kadhale"	Mashook Rahman	Adithya RK	5:50
2.	"Avalidam Sol"	Mashook Rahman	A. R. Ameen, Jonita Gandhi	4:58
3.	"Uyiraare Uyiraare"	Snehan	Soubhagya Mohapatra	5:11
4.	"Kannae Kanmaniye"	Mashook Rahman	A. R. Rahman	5:37
5.	"Yaavum Neeye"	Mashook Rahman	Khatija Rahman	3:31
6.	"Jigar Thandhaale"	Pa. Vijay	Haricharan	3:33
7.	"Maayakkaari"	Vivek	Palakkad Sreeram	3:39
8.	"Chinnaware"	Dhanush	Shankar Mahadevan	3:03
9.	"Jigar Thanda" (Female)	Pa. Vijay	Khatija Rahman, Amina Rafiq, Adithya RK	4:31
Total length:				39:53

Telugu
No.	Title	Lyrics	Singer(s)	Length
1.	"Prema Maayalo"	Kalprada	Nitesh Aher	5:50
2.	"Vinagalava"	Samrat	Nitesh Aher, Sanjana Kalmanje	4:58
3.	"Naa Pranam"	Samrat	Suryansh	5:11
4.	"Preme Ninu"	Samrat	Sarthak Kalyani	5:37
5.	"Chere Premaga"	Samrat	Khatija Rahman	3:31
6.	"Jigar Thanda" (Male)	Samrat	Anurag Kulkarni	3:33
7.	"Deen Thassadiya"	Samrat	Sarath Santhosh	3:39
8.	"Chinnaware"	Dhanush	Shankar Mahadevan	3:03
9.	"Jigar Thanda" (Female)	Samrat	Guru Priya, Amina Rafiq, Adithya RK	4:31
Total length:				39:53

== Reception ==
Aadrika Sominder of Hindustan Times wrote "Whether or not the film works for you, one thing is crystal clear: Rahman’s soundtrack stands tall on its own."

Alakshendra Singh of The Indian Express wrote "The album is versatile, entertaining and impressive, with a few loose strings hanging here and there."

Anuj Kumar of The Hindu wrote "Talking of score, Rahman’s music, as always, takes time to grow on you, but somewhere in between, it envelops you, with the signature “hmmmmm” motif making hearts go quiver in tense sequences."

Dhaval Roy of The Times of India wrote "A.R. Rahman’s music works in parts — the theme song “Tere Ishk Mein” and the Sufi track “Deewana Deewana” are striking, while the jazz-laced “Jigar Thanda Re” is atmospheric but not entirely impactful."

Sana Farzeen of India Today stated "Even the music, apart from the title track and the Tamil song, fails to land, which is heartbreaking because it's AR Rahman."

Saibal Chatterjee of NDTV wrote "While the score works, little else in the film is music."

== Personnel ==
Credits adapted from T-Series:

- Music composer, arranger and producer: A. R. Rahman
- Music supervisor: Prashanth Venkat
- Project manager: Karthik Sekaran
- Additional programming: Shubham Bhat, Raghav Chaitanya, Prashanth Venkat, Mari Sakthi, Sarthak Kalyani
- Additional arrangement: Prashanth Venkat, Kumaran Sivamani, Jim Satya
- Rhythm arrangement and production: Suryansh, Kalyan Chakravarthy
- Choir: The Indian Choral Ensemble
- Choir members: Arjun Chandy, Sarath Santosh, Sreekanth Hariharan, Aparna Harikumar, Aparna Narayanan, Amina Rafiq, Soubhagya Mohapatra, Suryansh, Pooja Tiwari, Nikitha Venkatesh, Shifa Ruby, Harshil Pathak, Nitesh Aher, Omkar Bhat, Padmaja Sreenivasan, Deepthi Suresh, Sushmita Narasimhan, Ishan Rojindar, Yadu Krishnan, Shridhar Ramesh
- Choral conductor: Karthik Manickavasakam
- Choral arrangement: Arjun Chandy
- Vocal supervision: Suryansh, Sarath Santhosh
- Electric and acoustic guitars: Keba Jeremiah
- Bass: Keba Jeremiah, Keith Peters, Prashanth Venkat, Mohammed Shoaib
- Classical guitar: Renin Raphael
- Drums: Gino Banks, Bishwanth Y R
- Piano: Mari Sakthi
- Duduk and flute: Kamalakhar
- Duff: Hariprasad TS
- Tabla: Rahul Prakash
- Strings: Sunshine Orchestra
- String conductor: Jerry Silvester Vincent
- Additional orchestration: Shubham Bhat
- Orchestra coordination: Samarth Srinivasan, Nipun Bhatnagar
- Ethnic strings: SM Subhani
- Clarinet: Sax Raja
- Solo violin: Rangapriya
- Shehnai: Pandit Dr. S. Ballesh
- Brass ensemble: The Dallas Horns, Dallas, Texas
- Recording studios: Panchathan Record Inn and AM Studios (Chennai), Panchathan Studios (Mumbai), Krimson Avenue Studios (Chennai), UNO Records (Chennai)
- Senior sound engineer (Panchathan Record Inn): Suresh Permal, Karthik Sekaran
- Assisting engineers (Panchathan Record Inn): Satish V Saravanan, Bharath Arjunan, Prashanth Venkat, Aravind Crescendo
- Recording engineers: Pradeep Menon, Krishnan Subramanian, Aravind MS, S Padmasharan (AM Studios); Nitish R Kumar, Harshil Pathak, Naval Chikhliya, Dilshaad Shabbir Shaikh (Panchathan Studios); Prithvi Chandrashekhar, Rajat Kumpawat (Krimson Avenue Studios); Biju James, Abin Ponnachan (UNO Records)
- Mixing and mastering: Nitish R. Kumar, Pradeep Menon, Suresh Permal, Vinay Sridhar
- Dolby Atmos mixing: Riyasdeen Riyan, Suresh Permal, Akash Shravan
- Additional mixing and mastering: Akash Shravan, Abin Paul
- Technical lead: Riyasdeen Riyan
- Musicians' coordinator: R. Samiduran, Abdul Haiyum
