= Screen Award for Best Male Debut =

Annual film award in India

Screen Award for Most Promising Newcomer – Male
- The 2026 recipient: Ahaan Panday
- Awarded for: Most Promising Newcomer – Male
- Country: India
- Presented by: Screen India
- First award: Bobby Deol, Barsaat (1996)
- Currently held by: Ahaan Panday, Saiyaara (2026)

The Star Screen Award for Most Promising Newcomer – Male is chosen by a distinguished panel of judges from the Indian Bollywood film industry and the winners are announced in December.

== Winners ==
Year	Winner	Film
1996	Bobby Deol	Barsaat
1997	Chandrachur Singh	Maachis
1998	Akshaye Khanna	Himalay Putra
1999	–	–
2000	Aftab Shivdasani	Mast
2001	R. Madhavan	Rehnaa Hai Terre Dil Mein
2002	Arjun Rampal	Deewaanapan; Moksha: SalvationPyaar Ishq Aur Mohabbat
2003	Vivek Oberoi	Company
2004	Shahid Kapoor	Ishq Vishk
2005	–	–
2006	Shiney Ahuja	Hazaaron Khwaishein Aisi
2007	Siddharth	Rang De Basanti
2008	Ranbir Kapoor	Saawariya
2009	Farhan Akhtar	Rock On!!
2010	Omi Vaidya	3 Idiots
2011	Ranveer Singh	Band Baaja Baaraat
2012	Divyendu Sharma	Pyaar Ka Punchnama
2013	Ayushmann Khurrana	Vicky Donor
2014	Sushant Singh Rajput	Kai Po Che!
2015	Tiger Shroff	Heropanti
2016	Vicky Kaushal	Masaan
2017	Harshvardhan Kapoor	Mirzya
2017	Jim Sarbh	Neerja
2018	Aparshakti Khurana	Dangal
2019	Ishaan Khatter	Beyond the CloudsDhadak
2020	Siddhant Chaturvedi	Gully Boy
2026	Ahaan Panday	Saiyaara

== See also ==
- Screen Awards
- Cinema of India
