= IIFA Award for Best Actress =

International Indian Film Academy Award

- The 2026 Recipient: Aneet Padda
- Awarded for: Best Performance by an Actress in a Leading Role
- Country: India
- Presented by: International Indian Film Academy
- First award: Aishwarya Rai, Hum Dil De Chuke Sanam (2000)
- Currently held by: Aneet Padda, Saiyaara (2026)
- Website: IIFA Awards

The IIFA Award for Best Actress is given by the International Indian Film Academy as part of its annual award ceremony for Hindi films, to recognise a female actor who has delivered an outstanding performance in a leading role. The recipient is chosen by viewers, and the winner is announced at the ceremony. The most recent recipient is Aneet Padda, for her performance in Saiyaara.

== Superlatives ==
=== Multiple wins ===
Individuals with two or more wins:

Wins	Actress
4	Alia Bhatt; Rani Mukerji
3	Vidya Balan
2	Aishwarya Rai; Kareena Kapoor; Deepika Padukone

=== Multiple nominees ===
- 11 Nominations: Deepika Padukone
- 10 Nominations: Vidya Balan, Alia Bhatt
- 9 Nominations: Rani Mukerji
- 8 Nominations: Kareena Kapoor, Priyanka Chopra
- 7 Nominations: Aishwarya Rai
- 5 Nominations: Preity Zinta, Tabu
- 4 Nominations: Kangana Ranaut, Taapsee Pannu, Katrina Kaif
- 3 Nominations: Karisma Kapoor, Kajol, Anushka Sharma, Shraddha Kapoor
- 2 Nominations: Ameesha Patel, Madhuri Dixit, Shilpa Shetty, Urmila Matondkar, Mahie Gill, Sridevi, Kiara Advani, Yami Gautam

Superlative	Actor	Record
Actresses with most awards	Alia Bhatt; Rani Mukerji	4
Actress with most nominations	Deepika Padukone	11
Actress with most consecutive nominations	Rani Mukerji	5 (2003-2007)
Actress with most consecutive wins	Rani Mukerji	3 (2005-2007)
Actresses with most nominations without ever winning	Taapsee Pannu; Katrina Kaif	4
Actress with most nominations in a single year	Deepika Padukone	3 (2014)
Oldest Winner	Sridevi (Mom)	54 (Note: Sridevi won the award posthumously, having passed away at the age of 54)
Oldest Nominee	Neena Gupta (Badhaai Ho)	60
Youngest Winner	Nitanshi Goel (Laapataa Ladies)	17
Youngest Nominee	Zaira Wasim (Secret Superstar); Nitanshi Goel (Laapataa Ladies)	17

- Karisma Kapoor and Kareena Kapoor are the only siblings who won the award.
- Sridevi is the only actress who won the award posthumously.
- Rani Mukerji, Kangana Ranaut, Anushka Sharma, Tabu and Priyanka Chopra are the only recipients who also won the IIFA Award for Best Supporting Actress. Mukerji is the only actress who won both the awards in the same year (2005).
- Kareena Kapoor, Vidya Balan, Kangana Ranaut, Deepika Padukone and Kriti Sanon are the recipients who also won the IIFA Award for Best Debut.
- Kangana Ranaut is the only actress who won in all 3 big categories: Best Actress, Best Supporting Actress and Best Female Debut.
- Rani Mukerji holds the record for the longest gap between Best Actress wins, spanning 17 years between 2007 (Kabhi Alvida Naa Kehna) and 2024 (Mrs. Chatterjee vs Norway).

== Winners and nominees ==
- Winners are listed first in **bold**, followed by the other nominees.

† – Indicates the performance also won the Filmfare Award for Best Actress
‡ – Indicates the performance was also nominated for the Filmfare Award for Best Actress

=== 2000s ===
- **2000 Aishwarya Rai – Hum Dil De Chuke Sanam** as **Nandini** †
  - Aishwarya Rai – Taal as Mansi Shankar ‡
  - Kajol – Hum Aapke Dil Mein Rehte Hain as Megha ‡
  - Karisma Kapoor – Biwi No.1 as Pooja Mehra ‡
  - Sonali Bendre – Sarfarosh as Seema
- **2001 Karisma Kapoor – Fiza** as **Fiza Ikramullah** †
  - Madhuri Dixit – Pukar as Anjali ‡
  - Preity Zinta – Kya Kehna as Priya Baxi ‡
  - Shilpa Shetty – Dhadkan as Anjali
  - Tabu – Astitva as Aditi Pandit ‡
- **2002 Tabu – Chandni Bar** as **Mumtaz Ali Ansari** ‡
  - Ameesha Patel – Gadar: Ek Prem Katha as Sakina ‡
  - Gracy Singh – Lagaan as Gauri
  - Kajol – Kabhi Khushi Kabhie Gham as Anjali Sharma Raichand †
  - Preity Zinta – Dil Chahta Hai as Shalini
- **2003 Aishwarya Rai – Devdas** as **Parvati "Paro" Chakraborty** †
  - Ameesha Patel – Humraaz as Priya Singhania ‡
  - Karisma Kapoor – Shakti: The Power as Nandini ‡
  - Madhuri Dixit – Devdas as Chandramukhi
  - Rani Mukerji – Saathiya as Suhani Sharma ‡
- **2004 Preity Zinta – Kal Ho Naa Ho** as **Naina Catherine Kapur** †
  - Hema Malini – Baghban as Pooja Malhotra ‡
  - Preity Zinta – Koi... Mil Gaya as Nisha ‡
  - Rani Mukerji – Chalte Chalte as Priya Chopra ‡
  - Urmila Matondkar – Bhoot as Swati ‡
- **2005 Rani Mukerji – Hum Tum** as **Rhea Prakash** †
  - Kareena Kapoor – Aitraaz as Priya Saxena
  - Priyanka Chopra – Mujhse Shaadi Karogi as Rani Singh
  - Shilpa Shetty – Phir Milenge as Tamanna Sahni ‡
  - Urmila Matondkar – Ek Hasina Thi as Sarika Vartak ‡
- **2006 Rani Mukerji – Black** as **Michelle McNally** †
  - Konkona Sen Sharma – Page 3 as Madhvi Sharma
  - Preity Zinta – Salaam Namaste as Ambar "Ambi" Malhotra ‡
  - Rani Mukerji – Bunty Aur Babli as Vimmi "Babli" Saluja ‡
  - Vidya Balan – Parineeta as Lalita ‡
- **2007 Rani Mukerji – Kabhi Alvida Naa Kehna** as **Maya Talwar** ‡
  - Aishwarya Rai – Dhoom 2 as Sunehri ‡
  - Kajol – Fanaa as Zooni Ali Baig †
  - Kangana Ranaut – Gangster as Simran
  - Kareena Kapoor – Omkara as Dolly Mishra ‡
  - Vidya Balan – Lage Raho Munna Bhai as Jhanvi
- **2008 Kareena Kapoor – Jab We Met** as **Geet Dhillon** †
  - Aishwarya Rai – Guru as Sujata Desai ‡
  - Deepika Padukone – Om Shanti Om as Shantipriya / Sandhya (Sandy) ‡
  - Katrina Kaif – Namastey London as Jasmeet 'Jazz' Malhotra
  - Tabu – Cheeni Kum as Nina Verma
  - Vidya Balan – Bhool Bhulaiyaa as Avni S. Chaturvedi ‡
- **2009 Priyanka Chopra – Fashion** as **Meghna Mathur** †
  - Aishwarya Rai – Jodhaa Akbar as Jodhaa Bai ‡
  - Asin – Ghajini as Kalpana Shetty ‡
  - Bipasha Basu – Race as Sonia Singh
  - Katrina Kaif – Singh Is Kinng as Sonia Singh

=== 2010s ===
- **2010 Kareena Kapoor – 3 Idiots** as **Pia Sahastrabudhhe** ‡ (tied with) **Vidya Balan – Paa** as **Vidya** †
  - Deepika Padukone – Love Aaj Kal as Meera Pandit ‡
  - Mahie Gill – Dev D as Parminder 'Paro'
  - Priyanka Chopra – Kaminey as Sweety Shekhar Bhope ‡
- **2011 Anushka Sharma – Band Baaja Baaraat** as **Shruti Kakkar** ‡
  - Aishwarya Rai – Guzaarish as Sofia D'Souza ‡
  - Kareena Kapoor – Golmaal 3 as Daboo ‡
  - Katrina Kaif – Raajneeti as Indu Patp Singh
  - Vidya Balan – Ishqiya as Krishna Verma ‡
- **2012 Vidya Balan – The Dirty Picture** as **Reshma / Silk** †
  - Kangana Ranaut – Tanu Weds Manu as Tanuja 'Tanu' Trivedi
  - Kareena Kapoor – Bodyguard as Divya
  - Mahie Gill – Saheb, Biwi Aur Gangster as Madhavi Devi ‡
  - Priyanka Chopra – 7 Khoon Maaf as Susanna Anna-Marie Johannes ‡
- **2013 Vidya Balan – Kahaani** as **Vidya Venkatesan Bagchi** †
  - Deepika Padukone – Cocktail as Veronica Malaney ‡
  - Huma Qureshi – Gangs of Wasseypur – Part 2 as Mohsina
  - Kareena Kapoor – Heroine as Mahi Arora ‡
  - Priyanka Chopra – Barfi! as Jhilmil Chatterjee ‡
  - Sridevi – English Vinglish as Shashi Godbole ‡
- **2014 Deepika Padukone – Chennai Express** as **Meenalochni 'Meena' Azhagusundaram** ‡
  - Deepika Padukone – Goliyon Ki Raasleela Ram-Leela as Leela Sanera †
  - Deepika Padukone – Yeh Jawaani Hai Deewani as Dr. Naina Talwar ‡
  - Nimrat Kaur – The Lunchbox as Ila
  - Shraddha Kapoor – Aashiqui 2 as Aarohi Keshav Shirke ‡
  - Sonakshi Sinha – Lootera as Pakhi Roy Chaudhary ‡
- **2015 Kangana Ranaut – Queen** as **Rani Mehra** †
  - Alia Bhatt – 2 States as Ananya Swaminathan
  - Anushka Sharma – PK as Jagat "Jaggu" Janani Sahni
  - Deepika Padukone – Happy New Year as Mohini Joshi
  - Priyanka Chopra – Mary Kom as Mary Kom ‡
  - Rani Mukerji – Mardaani as Shivani Shivaji Roy ‡
- **2016 Deepika Padukone – Piku** as **Piku Banerjee** †
  - Deepika Padukone – Bajirao Mastani as Mastani ‡
  - Kangana Ranaut – Tanu Weds Manu Returns as Tanuja "Tanu" Trivedi / Kumari "Kusum" Sangwan (Datto) ‡
  - Priyanka Chopra – Dil Dhadakne Do as Ayesha Mehra / Sangha
  - Shraddha Kapoor – ABCD 2 as Vinnie
- **2017 Alia Bhatt – Udta Punjab** as **Kumari Pinky** †
  - Alia Bhatt – Dear Zindagi as Kaira (Koko) ‡
  - Anushka Sharma – Ae Dil Hai Mushkil as Alizeh ‡
  - Sonam Kapoor – Neerja as Neerja Bhanot ‡
  - Taapsee Pannu – Pink as Minal Arora
- **2018 Sridevi – Mom** as **Devki Sabarwal** ‡
  - Alia Bhatt – Badrinath Ki Dulhania as Vaidehi Trivedi ‡
  - Bhumi Pednekar – Shubh Mangal Saavdhan as Sugandha Joshi ‡
  - Vidya Balan – Tumhari Sulu as Sulochana "Sulu" Dubey †
  - Zaira Wasim – Secret Superstar as Insia Malik ‡
- **2019** **Alia Bhatt** – **Raazi** as **Sehmat Khan** †
  - Deepika Padukone – Padmaavat as Rani Padmavati ‡
  - Neena Gupta – Badhaai Ho as Priyamvada 'Babli' Kaushik ‡
  - Rani Mukerji – Hichki as Naina Mathur ‡
  - Tabu – Andhadhun as Simi ‡

=== 2020s ===
- **2020** **Alia Bhatt** – **Gully Boy** as **Safeena Firdausi** †
  - Kareena Kapoor Khan – Good Newwz as Deepti Batra ‡
  - Priyanka Chopra – The Sky Is Pink as Aditi Chaudhary ‡
  - Taapsee Pannu – Badla as Naina Sethi
  - Vidya Balan – Mission Mangal as Tara Shinde ‡
- **2021–22 Kriti Sanon – Mimi** as **Mimi Rathore** †
  - Kiara Advani – Shershaah as Dimple Cheema ‡
  - Taapsee Pannu – Thappad as Amrita Sabharwal †
  - Sanya Malhotra – Pagglait as Sandhya Giri
  - Vidya Balan – Sherni as Vidya Vincent ‡
- **2023 Alia Bhatt – Gangubai Kathiawadi** as **Gangubai** †
  - Alia Bhatt – Darlings as Badrunissa
  - Shefali Shah – Darlings as Shamshunissa
  - Tabu – Bhool Bhulaiyaa 2 as Anjulika Chatterjee / Manjulika Chatterjee ‡
  - Yami Gautam – A Thursday aa Naina Jaiswal
- **2024 Rani Mukerji – Mrs. Chatterjee vs Norway** as **Debika Chatterjee** ‡
  - Alia Bhatt – Rocky Aur Rani Kii Prem Kahaani as Rani Chatterjee †
  - Deepika Padukone – Pathaan as Rubina Mohsin ‡
  - Kiara Advani – Satyaprem Ki Katha as Katha Kapadia ‡
  - Taapsee Pannu – Dunki as Manu Randhawa ‡
- **2025 Nitanshi Goel – Laapataa Ladies** as **Phool Kumari**
  - Alia Bhatt – Jigra as Satyabhama "Satya" Anand †
  - Katrina Kaif – Merry Christmas as Maria
  - Shraddha Kapoor – Stree 2 (Note: Kapoor's character in the film is unnamed.) ‡
  - Yami Gautam – Article 370 as Zooni Haksar ‡
- **2026 Aneet Padda – Saiyaara** as **Vaani Batra**

== See also ==
- IIFA Awards
- Bollywood
- Cinema of India
