= Mohit Suri =

Indian filmmaker (born 1981)

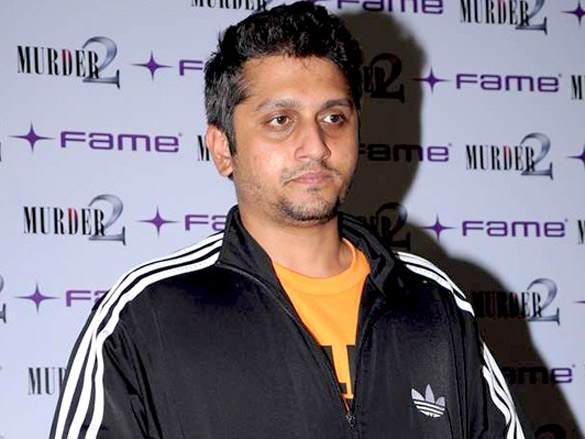
- Suri in 2011
- Born: 11 April 1981 (age 45); Mumbai, Maharashtra, India
- Occupations: Film director; film producer
- Years active: 2005–present
- Spouse: Udita Goswami (m. 2013)
- Children: 2
- Relatives: Bhatt family

Mohit Suri (born 11 April 1981) is an Indian film director. He directed the films Murder 2 (2011), the romantic action-thrillers Awarapan (2007), Ek Villain (2014) and Malang (2020). He also directed the musical romance films Aashiqui 2 (2013) and Saiyaara (2025), the latter becoming the highest grossing film of his career. He has been married to Udita Goswami since 2013 and has two children.

== Early life ==
Mohit Suri was born and brought up in Mumbai. His father Daksh Suri worked for Dunlop in Chennai and his mother, Heena, was an air hostess. He has one sister, former actress Smilie Suri.

Director Mahesh Bhatt, producer Mukesh Bhatt and screenwriter Robin Bhatt are his maternal uncles whereas Nanabhai Bhatt was his maternal grandfather. Actress-director Pooja Bhatt, fitness trainer Rahul Bhatt, director Vishesh Bhatt and actress Alia Bhatt are his first cousins while actor Emraan Hashmi is his second cousin.

== Career ==
After working as an office assistant for T-Series as well as assistant director in Vikram Bhatt's films Kasoor (2001), Awara Paagal Deewana (2002) and Footpath (2003), Suri made his directorial debut with the moderately successful Zeher (2005) and then directed movies like Kalyug (2005), Woh Lamhe (2006), Awarapan (2007), Raaz: The Mystery Continues (2009) and Crook (2010).

Suri's breakthrough period begun with the unexpected earning of his psychological thriller Murder 2 (2011), one of the highest-grossing Hindi films of 2011. This was followed by the highly successful musical love stories Aashiqui 2 (2013) and Ek Villain (2014), with the latter being a revenge drama too and entering 100 Crore Club in India.

Post the release of his majorly anticipated dramas Hamari Adhuri Kahani (2015) and Half Girlfriend (2017), he garnered critical and commercial success via the romantic suspense thriller Malang (2020). In 2022, he released Ek Villain Returns starring John Abraham, Arjun Kapoor, Disha Patani, and Tara Sutaria. Unlike the prequel, it opened to mixed reviews and underperformed at the box-office.

In 2025, he directed the romantic drama Saiyaara, starring debutants Ahaan Panday and Aneet Padda, produced by Yash Raj Films. It achieved significant critical and commercial success at the box-office, owing to the chartbuster music and performances.

== Other works ==
Apart from his occupation as a director, Suri was the judge of Star Plus's dance reality series Nach Baliye 8 and formed EMI Records India, one of the best musical platforms in India, which produced singers like Yash Narvekar, Anushka Shahaney etc.

== Personal life ==
In 2013, Suri married former Indian actress Udita Goswami in a private, traditional Punjabi wedding. The couple have a daughter (b. 2015) and son (b. 2018).

== Filmography ==
=== As director ===
Year	Title	Director	Writer	Notes
2005	Zeher	Yes	No	
2005	Kalyug	Yes	Story	
2006	Woh Lamhe	Yes	No	
2007	Awarapan	Yes	No	
2009	Raaz: The Mystery Continues	Yes	Story	
2010	Crook	Yes	Story	
2011	Murder 2	Yes	No	
2013	Aashiqui 2	Yes	No	
2014	Ek Villain	Yes	No	
2015	Hamari Adhuri Kahani	Yes	No	
2017	Half Girlfriend	Yes	No	Also co-producer
2020	Malang	Yes	Yes	
2022	Ek Villain Returns	Yes	Yes	
2025	Saiyaara	Yes	No	

=== As assistant director ===
Year	Title
2001	Kasoor
2002	Awara Paagal Deewana
2003	Footpath

== Awards and nominations ==
Year	Award	Category	Work	Result	Notes	Ref.
2014	Zee Cine Awards	Zee Cine Award for Best Director	Aashiqui 2	Nominated		
2026	Zee Cine Awards	Zee Cine Award for Best Director	Saiyaara	Won		
2026	News18 Showsha Reel Awards	Best Director	Saiyaara	Won		
2026	Pinkvilla Screen and Style Icons Awards	Best Director (Jury)	Saiyaara	Won		
2026	Screen Awards	Screen Award for Best Director	Saiyaara	Nominated		
2026	Indian Film Festival of Melbourne	Best Director	Saiyaara	Nominated		
