= IIFA Award for Star Debut of the Year – Male =

International Indian Film Academy Award

- The 2026 Recipient: Ahaan Panday
- Awarded for: Best Debut Performance by an Actor
- Country: India
- Presented by: International Indian Film Academy
- First award: Hrithik Roshan – Kaho Naa Pyaar Hai; Abhishek Bachchan – Refugee; Rahul Dev – Champion; Uday Chopra – Mohabbatein (2001)
- Currently held by: Ahaan Panday, Saiyaara (2026)
- Website: IIFA Awards

The IIFA Award for Star Debut of the Year – Male is given by the International Indian Film Academy as part of its annual award ceremony to recognise a male actor who has delivered an outstanding performance in his debut film. Originally known as the "IIFA Award for Fresh Face of the Year (Male)", it was officially given its new title in 2006. During its inaugural year in 2001, four separate actors were presented with an award.

== Winners ==
=== 1990s ===
- 1999
  Not awarded

=== 2000s ===
- 2001
  Abhishek Bachchan – Refugee as Refugee (tied with) Hrithik Roshan – Kaho Naa... Pyaar Hai as Rohit/Raj Chopra, Rahul Dev – Champion as Naseer Ahmed and Uday Chopra – Mohabbatein as Vikram Kapoor/Oberoi
- 2002
  Arjun Rampal – Pyaar Ishq Aur Mohabbat as Gaurav Saxena
- 2003
  John Abraham – Jism as Kabir Lal
- 2004
  Shahid Kapoor – Ishq Vishk as Rajiv Mathur
- 2005
  Not awarded
- 2006
  Shiney Ahuja – Hazaaron Khwaishein Aisi as Vikram Malhotra
- 2007
  Upen Patel – 36 China Town as Rocky
- 2008
  Ranbir Kapoor – Saawariya as Ranbir Raj
- 2009
  Farhan Akhtar – Rock On!! as Aditya Shroff

=== 2010s ===
- 2010
  Jackky Bhagnani – Kal Kissne Dekha as Nihaal Singh (tied with) Omi Vaidya – 3 Idiots as Chatur Ramalingam (Silencer)
- 2011
  Ranveer Singh – Band Baaja Baaraat as Bittoo Sharma
- 2012
  Vidyut Jamwal – Force as Vishnu
- 2013
  Ayushmann Khurrana – Vicky Donor as Vicky Arora
- 2014
  Dhanush – Raanjhanaa as Kundan Shankar
- 2015
  Tiger Shroff – Heropanti as Bablu
- 2016
  Vicky Kaushal – Masaan as Deepak Chaudhary
- 2017
  Diljit Dosanjh – Udta Punjab as Sartaaj Singh
- 2018
  Not awarded
- 2019
  Ishaan Khatter – Dhadak as Madhukar "Madhu" Bhagla

=== 2020s ===
- 2020
  Abhimanyu Dassani – Mard Ko Dard Nahi Hota as Suryaanshu "Surya" Sampat
- 2022
  Ahan Shetty – Tadap as Ishaan
- 2023
  Shantanu Maheshwari – Gangubai Kathiawadi as Afsaan Badr-ur-Razzaq (tied with) Babil Khan – Qala as Jagan Batwal
- 2024
  Not awarded
- 2025
  Lakshya Lalwani – Kill as Amrit Rathod
- 2026
  Ahaan Panday – Saiyaara as Krish Kapoor

== See also ==
- International Indian Film Academy Awards
- IIFA Award for Star Debut of the Year – Female
