= Saiyaara (film) =

2025 Indian film by Mohit Suri

- Theatrical release poster
- Directed by: Mohit Suri
- Written by: Sankalp Sadanah
- Dialogues by: Rohan Shankar
- Produced by: Akshaye Widhani
- Starring: Ahaan Panday; Aneet Padda
- Cinematography: Vikas Sivaraman
- Edited by: Rohit Makwana; Devendra Murdeshwar
- Music by: Songs: Mithoon; Sachet–Parampara; Rishabh Kant; Vishal Mishra; Tanishk Bagchi; Faheem Abdullah; Arslan Nizami; Score: John Stewart Eduri
- Production company: Yash Raj Films
- Distributed by: Yash Raj Films
- Release date: 18 July 2025
- Running time: 156 minutes
- Country: India
- Language: Hindi
- Budget: ₹45 crore
- Box office: ₹579.23 crore

Saiyaara (transl. Planet) is a 2025 Indian Hindi-language musical romantic drama film directed by Mohit Suri. Produced by Yash Raj Films, it is loosely based on the 2004 South Korean film A Moment to Remember. Saiyaara stars debutants Ahaan Panday and Aneet Padda in the lead roles of a singer-songwriter duo who fall in love. Originally planned as a spiritual sequel to Suri's Aashiqui 2, creative differences led to the project being reworked into a standalone film under Yash Raj Films.

Saiyaara was released theatrically on 18 July 2025 to positive reviews from critics, with particular praise for Panday and Padda's performances, story, and its soundtrack. A major commercial success, the film grossed over ₹579 crore (US$60 million) worldwide, emerging as the third highest-grossing Hindi film of 2025 and the fourth highest-grossing Indian film of the year.

== Plot ==
Vaani is waiting to marry her college boyfriend Mahesh at the courthouse, but he calls to inform her that he is leaving her to marry a rich businessman's daughter to climb the social ladder. She faints after the news and wastes away into depression, giving up her writing

Six months later, she joins Buzzlist as an intern and meets Krish Kapoor, an aspiring musician stuck in his past and abusive childhood and battling with anger. Krish faces multiple setbacks in his musical career, including disputes with journalists, and a row with his band, but KV, his best friend, helps fund the band, although Krish's education is at stake. Krish returns a notebook of poetry accidentally left behind by Vaani at the publishing house and assaults a journalist, and becomes infatuated with her writings.

Although initially wary of Krish's moody nature, Vaani agrees to collaborate on a song for hip-hop singer Prince. Krish helps her to overcome a block and finds torn pages of her notebook at the cricket playground where he spends his time alone, and she begins to write again. Krish and Vaani slowly become close, and Vaani's world settles into a routine.

However, after Krish confronts his alcoholic father, Vaani comforts him and convinces him to enter rehabilitation, but Krish is forced to give up the credit for their project to pay for his father's rehabilitation, and he pushes Vaani away, believing she deserves better. They meet again at Prince's concert, where Krish confesses his love for her, and they begin dating, and Krish finally reconciles with his band.

Vaani's parents worry that Krish will harm Vaani like Mahesh did and confront Krish at the hospital after Vaani faints, but they reluctantly agree to let him continue seeing Vaani after Krish promises to do so. However, they learn that Vaani has early-onset Alzheimer's disease, and Krish has to quit his job to care for her, and on the advice of doctors, they move to a guesthouse in Alibag to make new memories.

At a later concert, Mahesh tries to assault Vaani, but Krish tries to save her, and she, in confusion, stabs his right arm and has a severe breakdown. At the guesthouse, Krish's father reconciles with him, and in one quiet moment, Krish plays a piano tune for Vaani, but she mistakes him for Mahesh and offers to write the words for his melody; Krish leaves to inform his crew that he is quitting the band to care for Vaani, but when he returns, Vaani has vanished. Krish discovers her diary with the words to the song she named "Saiyaara" and records it in her memory before releasing it to the world, where it goes viral, catapulting him to fame and making him reconcile with his band. He continues to tour the country with Vaani's writings.

A year later, KV finds a fan video of Vaani singing along with one of Krish's songs that went viral, and Krish tracks her down to an ashram in Manali. A letter she has written him reveals that she has fled to Manali to avoid hindering his musical career after recalling the incident at the concert but has continued to follow him, although she doesn't recognize Krish, but he gently reminds her of their time together at the cricket playground. Vaani's memories of their time together slowly return, and she says that she loves him. The film ends with Krish performing at Wembley Stadium with Vaani by his side as they marry, and Vaani continues to write her thoughts about the wedding.

== Cast ==
- Ahaan Panday as Krish Kapoor
- Aneet Padda as Vaani Batra
- Alam Khan as KV: Krish's best friend
- Rajesh Kumar as Mr. Rajesh Batra: Vaani's father
- Geeta Agarwal Sharma as Mrs. Geeta Batra: Vaani's mother
- Anngad Raaj as Rudransh "Ruddy" Batra: Vaani's brother
- Varun Badola as Ashok Kapoor: Krish's father
- Shaad Randhawa as Prince
- Shaan R. Grover as Mahesh Iyer: Vaani's ex-fiancé
- Sid Makkar as Vinit Rawal
- Neil Dutta as Cleo Matthews
- Ritika Murthy as Neha
- Meher Acharia-Dar as Dr. Khyati
- Mohit Wadhwa as Ritvik Roy

== Production ==
The film was officially announced by Yash Raj Films with Mohit Suri signed on as the director, and is a loose adaptation of the 2004 South Korean film A Moment to Remember. Sankalp Sadanah wrote the screenplay for the film, with the dialogues penned by Rohan Shankar. The technical crew consisted of cinematographer Vikas Sivaraman and editors Rohit Makwana and Devendra Murdeshwar. Ahaan Panday and Aneet Padda were cast in the lead roles, while for the female lead Suri expressed his desire to cast an actress who has not undergone any cosmetic treatments. The principal photography commenced in September 2024 and concluded in March 2025, with the film being shot in Mumbai, Goa, Manali, and Alibag.According to Forbes India, the film was made on a budget of ₹45 crore.

In an interview, Suri revealed that the project was initially conceived as a potential third entry in the Aashiqui series, but it did not happen with their producers. Inspired by the Netflix documentary series The Romantics, he started working on the idea, titled Saiyaara, on his own. Later, Akshaye Widhani, the CEO of Yash Raj Films, signed on to produce and support the film under the YRF banner. Further, in an update on social media, Bollywood Hungama revealed that the end credits scene of Saiyaara was actually shot on a single day, and was a last minute addition that was incorporated less than a month ahead of the film's release.

== Soundtrack ==
The music album consists of 7 songs, composed by Mithoon, Sachet–Parampara, Rishabh Kant (The Rish), Vishal Mishra, Tanishk Bagchi, Faheem Abdullah, and Arslan Nizami, with lyrics written by Irshad Kamil, Mithoon, Rishabh Kant and Raj Shekhar. The film score was composed by John Stewart Eduri, replacing Suri's regular collaborator Raju Singh. The vocals were provided by Arijit Singh, Jubin Nautiyal, Shreya Ghoshal, Shilpa Rao, Vishal Mishra, Sachet–Parampara, Faheem Abdullah and Hansika Pareek. The soundtrack album was released on 4 July 2025.

== Release ==
=== Theatrical ===
The film received a U/A 16+ certificate from the CBFC after 10 seconds of intimate visuals were deleted, objectionable words were replaced in four instances, and a static helmet safety disclaimer was added for two-wheeler scenes.The film has a runtime of 156 minutes. Saiyaara was released in the theatres on 18 July 2025.

=== Home media ===
Netflix acquired the film's digital streaming rights, and it began streaming there from 12 September 2025; the deal marked a significant shift away from YRF's usual streaming partner Amazon Prime Video, with pre-2020 YRF productions later being renewed by the platform as well. Sony Max acquired the satellite rights, having been the home of YRF's filmography since 2000. However, the Star Gold Network later acquired the rights to War and subsequent YRF releases; it then renewed all but a select handful of prior YRF productions for its own catalogue.

== Reception ==
=== Box office ===
Saiyaara closed its theatrical run with ₹579.23 crore (US$60 million) worldwide, with ₹337.78 crore (US$35 million) nett in India and $19.73 million overseas. Deadline described the film's box office performance as "unprecedented", and The Indian Express noted that it stood out "at a time when films are struggling to break even, especially the ones starring new faces or debutantes".

The film had a record-breaking opening day, collecting ₹21.25 crore (US$2.6 million) worldwide, marking the highest opening for a Hindi film featuring a debutant male lead. Its opening weekend was strong across India, especially in urban multiplexes, with ₹83 crore (US$10 million) net earned domestically and over ₹119 crore (US$14 million) globally. By the end of its first week, Saiyaara had collected ₹208.5 crore (US$20–21 million) net in India and approximately ₹251.5 crore (US$30 million) worldwide, surpassing Ek Villain to become the highest-grossing film of Mohit Suri's career. On its eighth day, the film maintained momentum, earning ₹17.5 crore (US$2.1 million) net. On 26 July 2025 (its ninth day), it crossed the ₹200 crore (US$24 million) milestone domestically with an additional ₹15.3 crore (US$1.8 million), becoming the second fastest Hindi film of 2025 to enter the ₹200 crore club. The film crossed the ₹300 crore mark on its ninth day.Its total stood at ₹220.75 crore (US$23 million) nett in India and ₹327.74 crore (US$34 million) gross worldwide by the end of day ten. By this point, Saiyaara had already outperformed the lifetime totals of Raid 2, Sitaare Zameen Par and Housefull 5 becoming the third highest-grossing Hindi film of 2025 as well as the fourth highest-grossing Indian film of the year. This made it the second-biggest opening week for a Hindi release in 2025, behind Chhaava. By its twelfth day of release, the film had earned an estimated ₹270.75 crore (US$32 million) net in India, with a domestic gross of ₹319.5 crore (US$38 million). Its overseas earnings stood at ₹86 crore (US$10.8 million), bringing its total worldwide gross to ₹404 crore (US$48 million), surpassing Kabir Singh as the highest-grossing Indian romantic film of all time. Within thirteen days, it had climbed to become the 22nd highest-grossing Hindi film of all time, surpassing RRR and Dhoom 3.

=== Critical response ===
On the review aggregator website Rotten Tomatoes, 63% of 19 critics' reviews are positive, with an average rating of 5.1/10.

The film received generally positive reviews from critics, with the lead performances and soundtrack garnering the most praise. Bollywood Hungama gave 4 out of 5 stars and described it as "a stirring musical saga" that was elevated by Mohit Suri's deft direction, heartfelt romance, chart-topping music, and the stellar performances of its debutant leads. Rishabh Suri of the Hindustan Times gave 3.5/5 stars and opined that while the story did not break new ground, it struck the right emotional chords, understood its audience, and delivered with sincerity, adding that "sometimes, that is more than enough". Vineeta Kumar of India Today gave 3.5/5 stars and found the film entertaining, emotional, and musical: a cinematic piece where the flaws were visible but the heart shone through.

Other critics were more reserved, pointing out the familiar storyline and uneven pacing. Radhika Sharma of NDTV gave 3/5 stars, summarising the plot as "as old as time": a bad boy meets a good girl, sparks fly, heartbreak and sacrifice follow, and then a reunion, but acknowledged Mohit Suri's strong command over heartbreak. Vinamra Mathur of Firstpost gave 3/5 stars and noted that while the love story was messy and imperfect, the lead actors sailed through it with conviction. Kusumika Das of Times Now gave 2.5/5 stars and felt the film aimed for the stars but only touched the clouds; the soul of the film lay in the performances, with occasional flashes of classic Mohit Suri magic in lines like "Mera na hona, tumhare bade hone ka wajah banega". Aishwarya Vasudevan of OTTplay gave 3/5 stars and wrote that the film "doesn’t reinvent the wheel of romance, but it sure makes it spin with heart", and praised the harmony between the two lead actors. Jaya Dwivedie of India TV gave 3/5 stars and described the film as a slow-paced love story that tried to reach the audience's hearts despite its unfamiliarity and incompleteness.

== Accolades ==
Award	Date of ceremony	Category	Recipient(s)	Result	Ref.
Bollywood Hungama India Entertainment Awards	3–4 December 2025	Most Iconic Debut of the Year – Male	Ahaan Panday	Won	
Bollywood Hungama India Entertainment Awards	3–4 December 2025	Most Iconic Debut of the Year – Female	Aneet Padda	Won	
Bollywood Hungama India Entertainment Awards	3–4 December 2025	Best On-Screen Jodi of the Year	Ahaan Panday and Aneet Padda	Won	
Zee Cine Awards	28 February–1 March 2026	Zee Cine Award for Best Film	Yash Raj Films	Nominated	
Zee Cine Awards	28 February–1 March 2026	Zee Cine Viewers' Choice Best Actor – Female	Aneet Padda	Won	
Zee Cine Awards	28 February–1 March 2026	Zee Cine Award for Best Track of the Year	"Saiyaara"	Won	
Zee Cine Awards	28 February–1 March 2026	Zee Cine Award for Best Director	Mohit Suri	Won	
Zee Cine Awards	28 February–1 March 2026	Zee Cine Critics Award for Best Film	Yash Raj Films	Won	
Zee Cine Awards	28 February–1 March 2026	Zee Cine Award for Best Male Debut	Ahaan Panday	Won	
Zee Cine Awards	28 February–1 March 2026	Zee Cine Award for Best Female Debut	Aneet Padda	Won	
Zee Cine Awards	28 February–1 March 2026	Zee Cine Award for Best Playback Singer – Male	Faheem Abdullah for "Saiyaara"	Won	
Zee Cine Awards	28 February–1 March 2026	Zee Cine Award for Best Playback Singer – Female	Shreya Ghoshal for "Saiyaara Reprise – Female"	Won	
Zee Cine Awards	28 February–1 March 2026	Zee Cine Award for Best Music Director	Mithoon, Sachet–Parampara, Tanishk Bagchi, The Rish, Vishal Mishra, Faheem Abdullah and Arslan Nizami	Won	
Zee Cine Awards	28 February–1 March 2026	Zee Cine Award for Best Lyricist	Irshad Kamil for "Saiyaara"	Won	
Zee Cine Awards	28 February–1 March 2026	Zee Cine Critics Award for Best Actor – Male	Ahaan Panday	Nominated	
Zee Cine Awards	28 February–1 March 2026	Zee Cine Critics Award for Best Actor – Female	Aneet Padda	Nominated	
News18 Reel Awards	7 March 2026	Best Film	Yash Raj Films	Nominated	
News18 Reel Awards	7 March 2026	Best Director (Popular Choice)	Mohit Suri	Won	
News18 Reel Awards	7 March 2026	Best Actor (Male)	Ahaan Panday	Nominated	
News18 Reel Awards	7 March 2026	Best Actor (Female)	Aneet Padda	Nominated	
News18 Reel Awards	7 March 2026	Best Music	Mithoon, Sachet–Parampara, Tanishk Bagchi, The Rish, Vishal Mishra, Faheem Abdullah and Arslan Nizami	Won	
News18 Reel Awards	7 March 2026	Best Playback Singer (Male)	Faheem Abdullah for "Saiyaara" and "Aawaara Angaara" (shared)	Won	
News18 Reel Awards	7 March 2026	Best Playback Singer (Male)	Sachet Tandon for "Humsafar" (shared)	Won	
News18 Reel Awards	7 March 2026	Best Playback Singer (Male)	Vishal Mishra for "Tum Ho Toh", "Mann Ye Mera" and "Deewaniyat"	Nominated	
News18 Reel Awards	7 March 2026	Best Playback Singer (Female)	Parampara Thakur for "Humsafar"	Nominated	
News18 Reel Awards	7 March 2026	Star of the Year (Male)	Ahaan Panday	Won	
News18 Reel Awards	7 March 2026	Star of the Year (Female)	Aneet Padda	Won	
Screen Awards	5 April 2026	Screen Award for Best Film	Yash Raj Films	Nominated	
Screen Awards	5 April 2026	Screen Award for Best Director	Mohit Suri	Nominated	
Screen Awards	5 April 2026	Breakthrough New Actor	Ahaan Panday	Won	
Screen Awards	5 April 2026	Breakthrough New Actress	Aneet Padda	Won	
Screen Awards	5 April 2026	Screen Award for Best Male Playback	Faheem Abdullah for "Saiyaara"	Won	
Screen Awards	5 April 2026	Screen Award for Best Male Playback	Jubin Nautiyal for "Barbaad"	Nominated	
Screen Awards	5 April 2026	Screen Award for Best Male Playback	Arijit Singh for "Dhun"	Nominated	
Screen Awards	5 April 2026	Screen Award for Best Female Playback	Shreya Ghoshal for "Saiyaara Reprise – Female"	Won	
Screen Awards	5 April 2026	Screen Award for Best Female Playback	Shilpa Rao for "Barbaad Reprise – Female"	Nominated	
Screen Awards	5 April 2026	Screen Award for Best Female Playback	Parampara Thakur for "Humsafar"	Nominated	
Screen Awards	5 April 2026	Screen Award for Best Lyricist	Irshad Kamil for "Saiyaara"	Nominated	
Screen Awards	5 April 2026	Best Song	Tanishk Bagchi, Faheem Abdullah and Arslan Nizami for "Saiyaara"	Won	
Screen Awards	5 April 2026	Best Song	The Rish for "Barbaad"	Nominated	
Screen Awards	5 April 2026	Best Song	Sachet–Parampara for "Humsafar"	Nominated	
Screen Awards	5 April 2026	Screen Award for Best Editing	Devendra Murdeshwar and Rohit Makwana	Nominated	
Screen Awards	5 April 2026	Screen Award for Best Background Music	John Stewart Eduri	Nominated	
Screen Awards	5 April 2026	Best Sound Design	Ganesh Gangadharan	Nominated	
Indian Film Festival of Melbourne	13–23 August 2026	Best Film	Yash Raj Films	Nominated	
Indian Film Festival of Melbourne	13–23 August 2026	People's Choice Award	Yash Raj Films	Won	
Indian Film Festival of Melbourne	13–23 August 2026	Best Director	Mohit Suri	Nominated	
Indian Film Festival of Melbourne	13–23 August 2026	Best Actor	Ahaan Panday	Nominated	
Indian Film Festival of Melbourne	13–23 August 2026	Best Actress	Aneet Padda	Nominated	
International Indian Film Academy Awards	Ceremony not held	Best Actress (Leading Role)	Aneet Padda	Won	
International Indian Film Academy Awards	Ceremony not held	Best Lyrics	Irshad Kamil for "Saiyaara"	Won	
International Indian Film Academy Awards	Ceremony not held	Best Playback Singer (Male)	Faheem Abdullah for "Saiyaara"	Won	
International Indian Film Academy Awards	Ceremony not held	Best Playback Singer (Female)	Shreya Ghoshal for "Saiyaara Reprise – Female"	Won	
International Indian Film Academy Awards	Ceremony not held	Best Male Debut	Ahaan Panday	Won	
