= Nitya Mehra =

Indian filmmaker (born 1980)

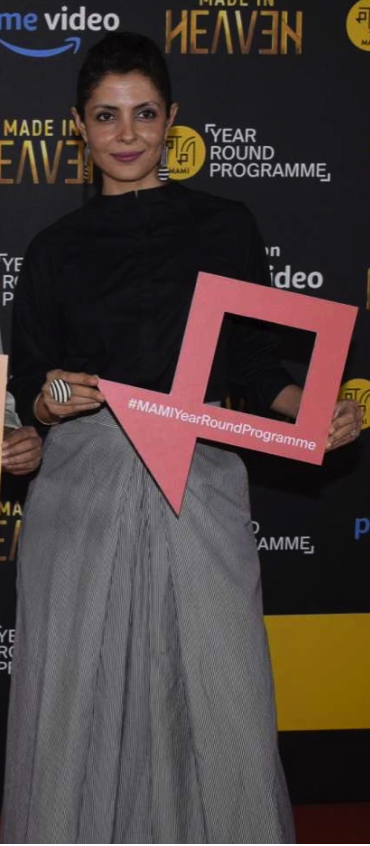
- Nitya Mehra at a Made in Heaven screening, Mumbai in 2019
- Born: 31 January 1980 (age 46); Amritsar, Punjab, India
- Education: Welham Girls' School
- Occupation: Film Director / Executive Producer / Writer
- Known for: Made in Heaven; Baar Baar Dekho; Big Girls Don't Cry
- Spouse: Karan Kapadiya (m. 2015)

Nitya Mehra is an Indian film director and screenwriter based in Mumbai. She is best known for her work on the romantic drama film Baar Baar Dekho (2016), and the Prime Video series Made in Heaven (2019–present) and Big Girls Don't Cry (2024).

== Early life and education ==
Mehra was born in Amritsar into a Punjabi Hindu family. Her mother was a fashion designer. She studied at Welham Girls' School, a boarding school in Dehradun. After completing her schooling she went on to study literature at Delhi University, after which she pursued a film production and direction program at New York University.

== Career ==
Mehra started her film making journey in 2001 as a Production Assistant in New York, on a Spike Lee production called 3 am. Eager to return to India, she began assisting film makers in India and learning the ropes. As an assistant director she worked on various Indian and international projects such as Lakshya, The Namesake, Don, Little Zizou, The Reluctant Fundamentalist, and Life of Pi.

Mehra directed the Star One teen comedy sitcom Happy Go Lucky in 2005.

Mehra's directorial breakthrough came in 2013 with the first season of Indian remake of the hit TV show 24, which aired on Colors TV.

In 2016, Mehra directed her first feature film Baar Baar Dekho starring Sidharth Malhotra and Katrina Kaif, co-produced by Excel Entertainment and Dharma Productions.

In 2019, Mehra worked on the critically acclaimed drama series Made in Heaven for Amazon Prime Video, where she served as the Director, Showrunner, and Executive Producer for Season 1. The show and its ensemble cast starring Arjun Mathur, Sobhita Dhulipala, Jim Sarbh, and Kalki Koechlin received universal positive reviews, and features in IMDb's '50 Most Popular Indian Web-Shows of All Time' list.

She wrote and directed the segment Chand Mubarak as part of Unpaused (2020), an Indian Hindi-language anthology film, released on Amazon Prime Video. The story, focusing on the unusual friendship between an auto-rickshaw driver, played by Abhishek Bannerjee and a reclusive older woman, played Ratna Pathak, received favourable reviews and was praised for its poignant writing and direction.

In 2023, Mehra returned as a Director for the second season of Made in Heaven.

She created and directed the coming-of-age drama Big Girls Don't Cry (2024) for Amazon Prime Video. The young-adult show following the lives of students at an all-girls boarding school, dealt with the themes of identity, class, and growing up. In 2025, she directed one of the segments in the anthology series, Yuva Sapno Ka Safar, starring Aneet Padda and Dalai Mulchandani, digitally released on Waves. Her next directorial is going to be, Nyaya, a courtroom drama series, starring Fatima Sana Shaikh, Arjun Mathur and Aneet Padda.

== Filmography ==
Key
†	Denotes films that have not yet been released

=== Films ===
Year	Movie	Notes
2006	The Namesake	Assistant Director
2006	Don	Assistant Director
2008	The Other End of the Line	Assistant Director
2008	Little Zizou	Assistant Director
2012	Life of Pi	Assistant Director
2012	The Reluctant Fundamentalist	Assistant Director
2016	Baar Baar Dekho	Director
2020	Unpaused	Director (Chaand Mubarak)

=== Television ===
Year	Television Show	Notes
2013	24	Season 1, Director (4 episodes)
2019	Made in Heaven	Season 1, Director (2 episodes), Showrunner, Executive Producer
2023	Made in Heaven	Season 2, Director (2 episodes)
2024	Big Girls Don't Cry	Creator, Director, Executive Producer
2025	Yuva Sapno Ka Safar	Segment: "Khatti Meethi Yaadein"
2026	Hunkkaar	Co-director
TBA	The Royals	Season 2, Director

== Awards and nominations ==
- Winner of the Best Director for Made in Heaven, at the Indian Television Academy Awards 2019

== Personal life ==
Nitya Mehra is married to Karan D. Kapadia and they have a son.
