= Zee Cine Award for Best Female Debut =

Indian Film Award

Zee Cine Awards for Best Female Debut
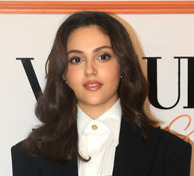
- The 2026 recipient: Aneet Padda
- Awarded for: Best Female Debut
- Country: India
- Presented by: Zee Entertainment
- First award: Mahima Chaudhry; Pardes (1998)
- Currently held by: Aneet Padda; Saiyaara (2026)

The Zee Cine Award for Best Female Debut is chosen by the jury members and a part of the annual Zee Cine Awards. They give awards to the new discoveries of Bollywood where they see some potential. The 1st Zee Cine Award was held on 14 March 1998 in Mumbai, India. Since then, the Award Ceremony is being held in different countries and continents.

The Zee Cine Award for Best Female Debut was given in the 1st ZCA (1998). Mahima Chaudhary became the first recipient of the Zee Cine Award for Best Female Debut (Jury/Critics). She received the award for Pardes (1998). The most recent recipient is Aneet Padda for Saiyaara (2026).

== Winners ==
The winners are listed below:-

Year	Portrait	Name	Film	Ref.
1998		Mahima Chaudhry	Pardes	
1999		Preity Zinta	Soldier	
2000		Rinke Khanna	Pyaar Mein Kabhi Kabhi	
2001		Ameesha Patel	Kaho Naa... Pyaar Hai	
2002		Gracy Singh	Lagaan: Once Upon a Time in India	
2003		Malini Sharma	Raaz	
2004		Bhoomika Chawla	Tere Naam	
2005		Gayatri Joshi	Swades	
2006		Konkona Sen Sharma & Vidya Balan	Page 3 & Parineeta	
2007		Kangana Ranaut	Gangster/ Woh Lamhe	
2008		Deepika Padukone	Om Shanti Om	
2009	Not Held			
2010	Not Held			
2011		Sonakshi Sinha	Dabangg	
2012		Parineeti Chopra	Ladies VS Ricky Bahl	
2013		Ileana D'Cruz & Yami Gautam	Barfi! Vicky Donor	
2014		Vaani Kapoor	Shuddh Desi Romance	
2015		Kriti Sanon	Heropanti	
2016		Harshaali Malhotra & Bhumi Pednekar	Bajrangi Bhaijaan; Dum Laga Ke Haisha	
2017		Ritika Singh	Saala Khadoos	
2018		Nidhhi Agerwal	Munna Michael	
2019		Janhvi Kapoor	Dhadak	
2020		Ananya Panday; Tara Sutaria	Student of The Year 2	
2021	Not Held			
2022	Not Held			
2023		Rashmika Mandana	Goodbye	
2024		Medha Shankr; Alizeh Agnihotri	12th Fail; Farrey	
2025		Nitanshi Goel Pratibha Ranta	Laapataa Ladies	
2026		Aneet Padda	Saiyaara	

== See also ==
- Zee Cine Awards
- Bollywood
- Cinema of India
