= Complex victim =

A complex victim is someone who was victimized, but does not fit the requirement of being an "ideal victim" because they are morally compromised in some respect or partially responsible for their own victimization. Their victimhood nature is usually influenced by social, political, and historical factors, that often involves the complexities of power, responsibility, and identity. People who are complex victims are usually responsible for making others victim, while also been unlawfully victimized.
