= Big Girls Don't Cry (TV series) =

- Official release poster
- Genre: Drama; Coming of age
- Created by: Nitya Mehra
- Written by: Sudhanshu Saria; Adwitiya Kereng Das; Sunayana Kumari; Radhika Malhotra
- Directed by: Sudhanshu Saria; Kopal Naithani; Karan Kapadia
- Starring: Pooja Bhatt; Mukul Chadda; Raima Sen; Zoya Hussain; Avantika Vandanapu; Tenzin Lhakyila; Aneet Padda; Dalai Vidushi; Afrah Sayed
- Country of origin: India
- Original language: English
- No. of series: 1
- No. of episodes: 7

Production
- Executive producers: Sudhanshu Saria; Rahul Gandhi; Nitya Mehra
- Producers: Karan Kapadia; Ashi Dua
- Cinematography: Cherin Paul; Kabir Tejpal
- Editors: Paramita Ghosh; Dipika Kalra

Original release
- Network: Amazon Prime Video
- Release: 14 March 2024

Big Girls Don't Cry is an Indian English-language coming of age drama television series created by Nitya Mehra and executive produced by Sudhanshu Saria. It stars Pooja Bhatt, Mukul Chadda, Raima Sen, Zoya Hussain, Avantika, Tenzin Lhakyila, Aneet Padda, Dalai, Vidushi, Afrah Sayed. The series was released on Amazon Prime Video on 14 March 2024. It received mixed-to-positive reviews from critics.

== Cast ==
- Pooja Bhatt as Anita Verma
- Mukul Chadda as Vipin Ahuja
- Raima Sen as Uma Ahuja
- Zoya Hussain as Aliya Lamba
- Avantika Vandanapu as Ludo Leah Joseph
- Aneet Padda as Roohi Ahuja
- Dalai as Pluggy
- Tenzin Lhakyila as Jayshree Chhetri
- Afrah Sayed as Noor Hassan
- Bodhisattva Sharma as Asad Sharif
- Vidushi as Kavya Yadav
- Suchitra Pillai as Khanna Ma'am
- Akshita Sood as Dia Malik
- Tanya Abrol as Pt Amrit
- Pavleen Gujral as Kavya's Mother
- Khalid Siddiqui as Noor's Father
- Shradha Kaul as Noor's Mother
- Gauri Malla as Jayshree's Grandmother
- Reecha Sharma as Jayshree's Mother
- Shataf Figar as Bob Verma
- Hafsa Ashraf as Naz Hassan
- Kajal Chonkar as Tsering Thapa
- Adytya Rraj as Veer Kapadia
- Loveleen Mishra as Miss Jeanette
- Udit Pandey as Jojo

== Reception ==
Vinamra Mathur of the Firstpost said in his review that "Every feeling may be related to by someone. 'Big Girls Don't Cry' also experiments with a lot. It begins with the fundamentals: arrogance, a pervasive sense of haughtiness in the classroom, and an assumed sense of entitlement and seniority." Shubhra Gupta of The Indian Express rated it 2.5/5 stars and stated in her review that "The show succeeds in capturing the distinct ambiance of an all-girls boarding school, where the adolescent students are exuberant, flamboyant, full of ideas, full of rebellion, and high on hormones." Udita Jhunjhunwala writes in Scroll.in that "The atmosphere of the boarding school piques your curiosity and sustains it, however briefly. The screenplay hardly skims the surface. It's similar to killing time by skimming through Instagram, stopping at a post for a fleeting glance, and then continuing." Archika Khurana of The Times of India rated this series 3/5 stars and wrote in her review that, "It isn't quite a riveting series, but it is a sentimental walk down memory lane. It's charming performances and relevant themes could make it worthwhile to see once, but ultimately, it doesn't make an impact." Titas Chowdhury of the News 18 gave 3 stars out of 5 and said "The show is neither a nostalgic trip down the memory lane nor a hard-hitting representation of teenage pangs. Some may even find it hard to relate." Zinia Bandyopadhyay of India Today stated "The series feels like a classic case of too many cooks spoiling the broth."
