= Zee Cine Awards =

Awards for the Hindi film industry

Zee Cine Award
- Awarded for: Excellence in the Hindi film industry
- Country: India
- Presented by: Zee Entertainment Enterprises
- First award: 1997; 26 years ago
- Website: zeecineawards.com

Television/radio coverage
- Network: Zee TV (1998–present)
- Related: Zee Cine Awards Telugu

The Zee Cine Award (ZCA) is an annual Indian awards ceremony for the Hindi film industry. They were instituted in November 1997 to award "Excellence in cinema – the democratic way".

They were first held in Mumbai until 2004, when the ZCA went international and had their ceremony in Dubai, and in following years in London, Mauritius, Malaysia, and London again in 2008 then Abu Dhabi in 2009. It was not held in 2010; due to TV release of Dance India Dance, but resumed in 2011, being held in Singapore in 2012 it was held at the CotaiArena in Macao.

The 2018 edition was held at MMRDA Grounds, Mumbai. It was also not held in 2021 and 2022 due to COVID-19 pandemic.

== Award Categories ==
Popular awards

- Best Film
- Best Actor
- Best Actress
- Song of the Year

Critics awards

- Best Film
- Best Director
- Best Actor
- Best Actress
- Best Actor in a Supporting Role
- Best Actress in a Supporting Role
- Best Villain
- Best Comedian
- Most Promising Director
- Best Male Debut
- Best Female Debut
- Best Male Playback Singer
- Best Female Playback Singer
- Best Music Director
- Best Lyricist
- Lifetime Achievement
- Best Performer of the Year Female
- Best Performer of the Year Male
- Face of the Year

Technical Awards

- Best Background Music
- Best Dialogue
- Best Story
- Best Screenplay
- Best Cinematography
- Best Editing
- Best Action
- Best Art Direction
- Best Audiography
- Best Choreography
- Best Costumes
- Best Processing
- Best Publicity
- Best Song Recording
- Best Visual Effects

Discontinued Awards

- Zee Cine Award for Outstanding Performance – Male (discontinued after 2002 and later revived in 2005 as the Jury’s Choice Award for Best Actor – Male)
- Zee Cine Award for Outstanding Performance – Female (discontinued after 2002 and later revived in 2005 as the Jury’s Choice Award for Best Actor – Female)

== See also ==
- Hindi cinema
- Cinema of India
