= List of awards and nominations received by Tabu =

Tabu awards and nominations
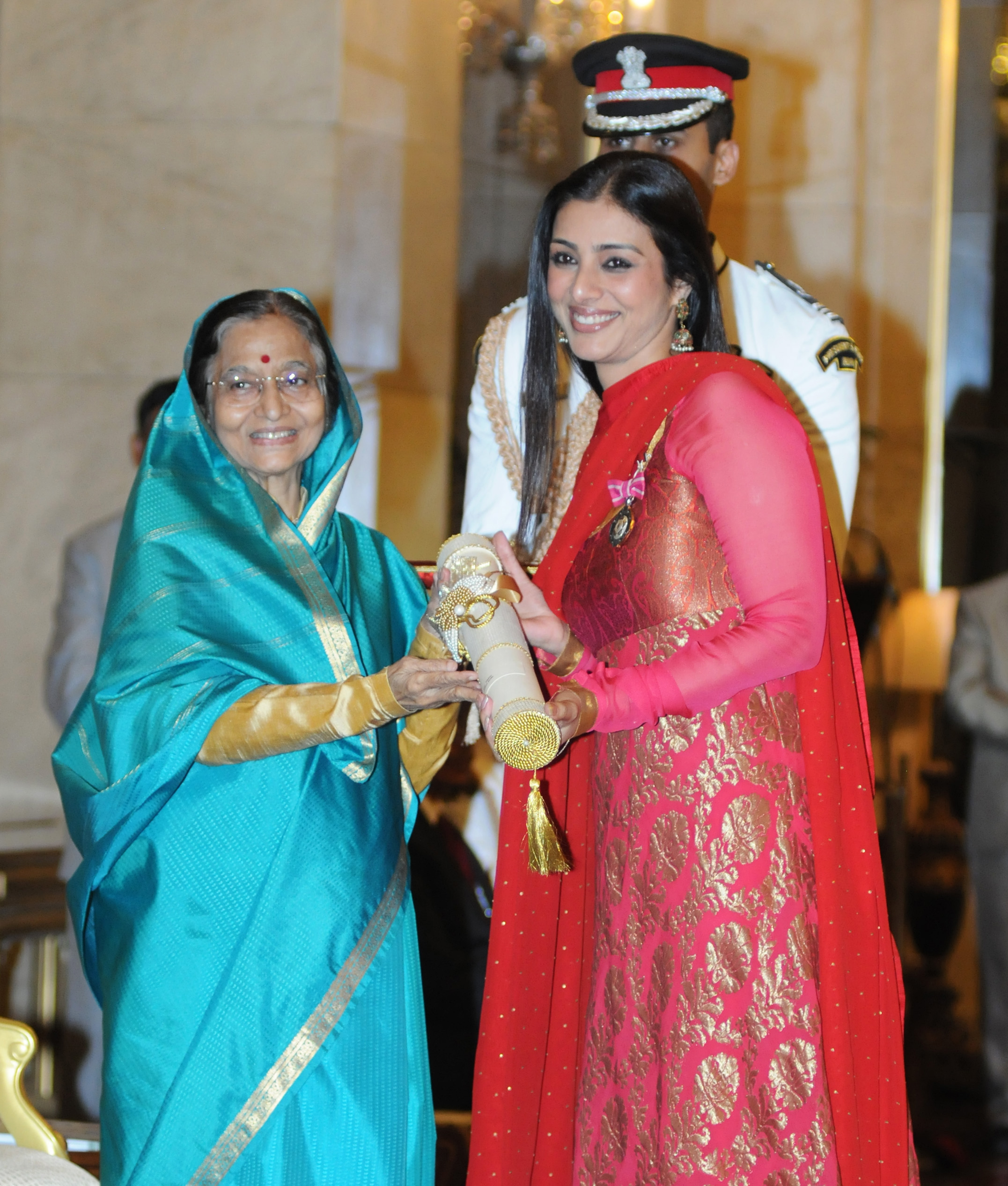
- Tabu being presented Padma Shri by former President of India Smt. Pratibha Patil in 2011.
Accolades
Award	Won	Nominated
Alliance of Women Film Journalists	1	1
Asian Film Awards	0	1
Asiavision Awards	1	1
Bengal Film Journalists' Association Awards	3	2
BIG Star Entertainment Awards	1	2
Bollywood Movie Awards	2	5
Filmfare Awards	7	17
Filmfare Awards South	2	3
Indian Film Festival of Melbourne	1	1
International Indian Film Academy Awards	2	9
Jagran Film Festival	1	1
National Film Awards	2	2
Padma Shri	1	1
Producers Guild Film Awards	2	3
Screen Awards	4	9
Stardust Awards	1	4
Times of India Film Awards	0	1
Zee Cine Awards	4	7
Other Awards, Honors and Recognition's	4	5
- Total number of awards and nominations (Note: Awards in certain categories do not have prior nominations and only winners are announced by the jury. For simplification and to avoid errors, each award in this list has been presumed to have had a prior nomination.)
Totals	35	69
- References

Tabu is an Indian actress. She has mainly acted in Hindi films, though she has also starred in numerous Telugu, Tamil, Malayalam, Marathi and Bengali language films, as well as Hollywood films. She has won the National Film Award for Best Actress twice, and holds the record for the most wins for the Filmfare Award for Best Actress (Critics) with five. Additionally, she has also received Filmfare Awards in Best Female Debut, Best Actress, Best Supporting Actress, Best Actress (Tamil) and Best Actress (Telugu) categories.

Despite a few exceptions, Tabu is best known for acting in artistic, low-budget films that go on to garner more critical appreciation than substantial box-office figures. Her appearances in commercially successful films include films such as Border (1997), Saajan Chale Sasural (1996), Biwi No.1 and Hum Saath-Saath Hain: We Stand United (1999). Her most notable performances include Maachis (1996), Virasat (1997), Hu Tu Tu (1999), Astitva (2000), Chandni Bar (2001), Maqbool (2003) and Cheeni Kum (2007). Her leading role in Mira Nair's American film The Namesake also drew major praise. She also co-starred in Ang Lee's film Life of Pi (2012), which was widely acclaimed.

Regarded as one of the most talented Indian female actors of her generation, Tabu is known to be selective about her film roles and has once said, "I do films which move me and most of all, the unit and the director should appeal to me." She was awarded the Padma Shri, India's fourth highest civilian award, in 2011 by the Government of India for her contributions towards the arts. At the 17th Indian Film Festival of Los Angeles she was honored with "Opening Night Tribute", in 2019.

== Alliance of Women Film Journalists ==
The Alliance of Women Film Journalists (AWFJ) is a non-profit organization founded in 2006. It is based in New York City and is dedicated to supporting work by and about women in the film industry.

Year (Note: Refers to the year in which the ceremony was held.)	Film	Category	Result	Ref.
2007	The Namesake	Best Seduction Award (with Irrfan Khan)	Won	

== Asian Film Awards ==
The Asian Film Awards are presented annually by the Hong Kong International Film Festival Society to members of Asian cinema.

Year	Film	Category	Result	Ref.
2015	Haider	Best Supporting Actress	Nominated	

== Asiavision Awards ==
The Asiavision Awards have been held annually since 2006 to honor the artistes and technicians of Indian cinema and television.

Year	Film	Category	Result	Ref.
2015	Drishyam	Outstanding Performance – Hindi	Won	

== Bengal Film Journalists' Association Awards ==
The Bengal Film Journalists' Association Awards were founded by the oldest Association of Film critics in 1937. It is one of the most prestigious awards held in India.

Year	Film	Category	Result	Ref.
1997	Maachis	Best Actress (Hindi)	Won	
2002	Chandni Bar	Best Actress (Hindi)	Won	
2004	Abar Aranye	Best Supporting Actress	Won	

== BIG Star Entertainment Awards ==
The BIG Star Entertainment Awards is an annual event organised by the Reliance Broadcast Network.

Year	Film	Category	Result	Ref.
2014	Haider	Most Entertaining Actor in a Thriller Film – Female	Won	
2015	Drishyam	Most Entertaining Actor in a Thriller Film – Female	Nominated	

== Bollywood Movie Awards ==
The Bollywood Movie Awards were presented annually by The Bollywood Group beginning in 1999. They were discontinued after 2007.

Year	Film	Category	Result	Ref.
2000 (Note: as Zee Gold Bollywood Awards.)	Biwi No.1	Best Supporting Actress	Won	
2001	Astitva	Best Actress	Nominated	
2001	Astitva	Best Actress (Critics)	Won	
2001	Astitva	Most Sensational Actress	Won	
2002	Chandni Bar	Best Actress	Nominated	

== Filmfare Awards ==
Established in 1954, the Filmfare Awards are presented annually by The Times Group to members of the Hindi film industry.

Year	Film	Result	Ref.
Best Female Debut
1995	Vijaypath	Won	
Best Actress
1996	Maachis	Nominated	
1998	Virasat	Nominated	
2000	Hu Tu Tu	Nominated	
2001	Astitva	Nominated	
2002	Chandni Bar	Nominated	
2019	Andhadhun	Nominated	
2023	Bhool Bhulaiyaa 2	Nominated	
2025	Crew	Nominated	
Best Actress (Critics)
1998	Virasat	Won	
2000	Hu Tu Tu	Won	
2001	Astitva	Won	
2008	Cheeni Kum	Won	
2019	Andhadhun	Nominated	
2023	Bhool Bhulaiyaa 2	Won	
Best Supporting Actress
1997	Jeet	Nominated	
2015	Haider	Won	
2016	Drishyam	Nominated	

== Filmfare Awards South ==
The Filmfare Awards South is the South Indian segment of the annual Filmfare Awards, presented by The Times Group to honour both artistic and technical excellence of professionals in the South Indian film industry. The awards are separately given for Kannada, Tamil, Telugu and Malayalam films.

Year	Film	Category	Result	Ref.
1997	Ninne Pelladutha	Best Actress – Telugu	Won	
2009	Pandurangadu	Best Supporting Actress – Telugu	Nominated	
2022	Ala Vaikunthapurramuloo	Best Supporting Actress – Telugu	Won	

== Indian Film Festival of Melbourne ==
The Indian Film Festival of Melbourne (IFFM) is an annual Indian film festival based in Melbourne, Australia. It is presented by Film Victoria and the State Government of Victoria, and produced by Mind Blowing Films, a Melbourne-based distributor of Indian cinema across Australia and New Zealand.

Year	Film	Category	Result	Ref.
2019	Andhadhun	Best Actress	Won	

== International Indian Film Academy Awards ==
The International Indian Film Academy Awards (shortened as IIFA) is an annual international event organised by the Wizcraft International Entertainment Pvt. Ltd. to honour excellence in the Hindi cinema.

Year	Film	Category	Result	Ref.
2000	Biwi No.1	Best Supporting Actress	Nominated	
2001	Astitva	Best Actress	Nominated	
2002	Chandni Bar	Best Actress	Won	
2008	Cheeni Kum	Best Actress	Nominated	
2015	Haider	Best Supporting Actress	Won	
2018	Golmaal Again	Best Supporting Actress	Nominated	
2019	Andhadhun	Best Actress	Nominated	
2023	Bhool Bhulaiyaa 2	Best Actress	Nominated	
2023	Drishyam 2	Best Supporting Actress	Nominated	

== Maharashtra State Film Awards ==
The Maharashtra State Film Awards are awarded by the Government of Maharashtra's Ministry of Cultural Affairs division for achievements in the Marathi cinema. Tabu has received one award.

Year	Film	Category	Result	Ref.
2000	Astitva	Best Actress	Won	

== National Film Awards ==
The National Film Awards are awarded by the Government of India's Directorate of Film Festivals division for achievements in the Indian film industry. Tabu has received two awards.

Year	Film	Category	Result	Ref.
1997	Maachis	Best Actress	Won	
2003	Chandni Bar (Note: Shared with Shobana for Mitr, My Friend)	Best Actress	Won	

== Producers Guild Film Awards ==
The Producers Guild Film Awards (previously knows as Apsara Film & Television Producers Guild Awards) is an annual event originated by the Film Producers Guild of India to recognize excellence in Indian film and television.

Year	Film	Category	Result	Ref.
2008	Cheeni Kum	Best Actress in a Leading Role	Nominated	
2015	Haider	Best Actress in a Supporting Role	Won	
2016	Drishyam	Best Actress in a Supporting Role	Won	

== Screen Awards ==
The Screen Awards are presented annually by Indian Express Limited to honour excellence in Hindi and Marathi cinema.

Year	Film	Category	Result	Ref.
1998	Virasat	Best Actress	Nominated	
2000	Hu Tu Tu	Best Actress	Nominated	
2001	Astitva	Best Actress	Won	
2008	Cheeni Kum	Best Actress	Nominated	
2008	Cheeni Kum	Best Actress (Critics)	Won	
2015	Haider	Best Supporting Actress	Won	
2015	Haider	Jodi No. 1 (with Shahid Kapoor)	Won	
2016	Fitoor	Best Supporting Actress	Nominated	
2018	Andhadhun	Best Actress	Nominated	

== Stardust Awards ==
The Stardust Awards are an annual event organised by Magna Publishing Company Limited.

Year	Film	Category	Result	Ref.
2008	Cheeni Kum & The Namesake	Actor of the Year – Female	Nominated	
2015	Haider	Best Supporting Actress	Won	
2016	Drishyam	Performer Of The Year – Female	Nominated	
2017	Fitoor	Best Supporting Actress	Nominated	

== Zee Cine Awards ==
The Zee Cine Awards is an annual award ceremony organised by the Zee Entertainment Enterprises.

Year	Film	Category	Result	Ref.
2001	Astitva	Best Actor – Female	Won	
2002	Chandni Bar	Best Actor – Female	Won	
2003	Filhaal...	Best Actor – Female	Nominated	
2008	Cheeni Kum	Best Actor – Female	Nominated	
2015	Haider	Best Actor in a Supporting Role – Female	Won	
2017	Fitoor	Best Actor in a Supporting Role – Female	Nominated	
2019	Andhadhun	Best Performance in a Negative Role	Won	

== Other awards, honors and recognitions ==
Year	Work	Academy / Award / organization	Category	Result	Ref.
1998	—N/a	Priyadarshni Academy Awards	Smita Patil Memorial Award for Best Actress	Won	
2011	Contribution towards Arts of Cinema	Republic of India	Civilian Award – Padma Shri	Won	
2015	Haider	Jagran Film Festival	Best Supporting Actress	Won	
2015	Haider	Bollywood Hungama Surfers Choice Movie Awards	Best Supporting Actress	Won	
2016	Drishyam	Times of India Film Awards	Best Supporting Actress	Nominated	
2019	—N/a	Femina Beauty Awards	Creative Icon of the Decade	Won	
2019	Andhadhun	Critics Choice Film Awards	Best Actor – Female	Nominated	
2021	Ala Vaikunthapurramuloo	South Indian International Movie Awards	Best Supporting Actress – Telugu	Won	

== See also ==
- Tabu filmography
- List of Indian film actresses
