= List of accolades received by Dil Chahta Hai =

Dil Chahta Hai awards and nominations
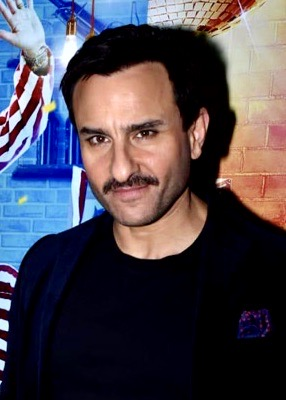
- Saif Ali Khan received several accolades for his performance in Dil Chahta Hai.
Awards and nominations
Award	Wins	Nominations
Bollywood Movie Awards	3	7
Filmfare Awards	7	13
International Indian Film Academy Awards	4	14
National Film Awards	2	2
Screen Awards	8	15
Zee Cine Awards	2	2

Totals (Note: Certain award groups do not simply award one winner. They acknowledge several different recipients, have runners-up, and have third place. Since this is a specific recognition and is different from losing an award, runner-up mentions are considered wins in this award tally. For simplification and to avoid errors, each award in this list has been presumed to have had a prior nomination.)
- Wins: 26
- Nominations: 53

Dil Chahta Hai (transl. The Heart Desires) is a 2001 Indian Hindi-language coming-of-age comedy-drama written and directed by Farhan Akhtar, and produced by Ritesh Sidhwani under Excel Entertainment. Depicting the routine life of Indian affluent youth, it focuses on a transition period in the romantic lives of three college-graduate friends (Aamir Khan, Saif Ali Khan, and Akshaye Khanna). The film also stars Preity Zinta, Sonali Kulkarni, and Dimple Kapadia. The soundtrack was composed by the trio Shankar–Ehsaan–Loy, with lyrics from Javed Akhtar. Farah Khan was the choreographer, and A. Sreekar Prasad was the editor.

The film premiered on 10 August 2001 and received widespread critical acclaim, Made on a production cost of ₹80 million (US$830,000), it performed moderately at the box office grossing ₹397.2 million (US$4.1 million). Although the film succeeded commercially in metropolitan areas, it did not do so among rural audiences due to the city-oriented lifestyle depicted in the film.

Dil Chahta Hai won 26 awards out of 53 nominations; the direction, the performances of the cast, the story, and the screenplay garnered the most attention from various award groups. At the 49th National Film Awards, the film received two trophies including Best Feature Film in Hindi. It was nominated in thirteen categories at the 47th Filmfare Awards, including Best Film, Best Director (Farhan Akhtar), Best Actor (Aamir Khan), and won seven, including Best Film (Critics), Best Supporting Actor (Khanna), and Best Comedian (Saif Ali Khan). Dil Chahta Hai garnered four awards in the third iteration of the International Indian Film Academy Awards, including Best Supporting Actor (Saif Ali Khan). Among other wins, it also won three Bollywood Movie Awards, eight Screen Awards, and two Zee Cine Awards.

== Awards and nominations ==
List of accolades received by Dil Chahta Hai
Award	Date of ceremony (Note: Date is linked to the article about the awards held that year, wherever possible.)	Category	Recipient(s)	Result	Ref.
Bollywood Movie Awards	29 June 2002	Best Actor (Critics)	Aamir Khan	Won	
Bollywood Movie Awards	29 June 2002	Best Supporting Actor	Saif Ali Khan	Nominated	
Bollywood Movie Awards	29 June 2002	Best Comedian	Saif Ali Khan	Won	
Bollywood Movie Awards	29 June 2002	Most Sensational Actor	Saif Ali Khan	Nominated	
Bollywood Movie Awards	29 June 2002	Best Music Director	Shankar–Ehsaan–Loy	Nominated	
Bollywood Movie Awards	29 June 2002	Best Lyricist	Javed Akhtar	Nominated	
Bollywood Movie Awards	29 June 2002	Best Playback Singer – Male	Shankar Mahadevan (for "Koi Kahe Kehta Rahe")	Won	
Filmfare Awards	16 February 2002	Best Film	Dil Chahta Hai	Nominated	
Filmfare Awards	16 February 2002	Best Film (Critics)	Dil Chahta Hai	Won	
Filmfare Awards	16 February 2002	Best Director	Farhan Akhtar	Nominated	
Filmfare Awards	16 February 2002	Best Actor	Aamir Khan	Nominated	
Filmfare Awards	16 February 2002	Best Supporting Actor	Akshaye Khanna	Won	
Filmfare Awards	16 February 2002	Best Comedian	Saif Ali Khan	Won	
Filmfare Awards	16 February 2002	Best Music Director	Shankar–Ehsaan–Loy	Nominated	
Filmfare Awards	16 February 2002	R. D. Burman Award	Shankar–Ehsaan–Loy	Won	
Filmfare Awards	16 February 2002	Best Playback Singer – Male	Shaan (for "Koi Kahe Kehta Rahe")	Nominated	
Filmfare Awards	16 February 2002	Best Playback Singer – Female	Alka Yagnik (for "Jaane Kyon")	Nominated	
Filmfare Awards	16 February 2002	Best Screenplay	Farhan Akhtar	Won	
Filmfare Awards	16 February 2002	Best Choreography	Farah Khan (for "Woh Ladki Hai Kahan")	Won	
Filmfare Awards	16 February 2002	Best Editing	A. Sreekar Prasad	Won	
International Indian Film Academy Awards	6 April 2002	Best Film	Dil Chahta Hai	Nominated	
International Indian Film Academy Awards	6 April 2002	Best Director	Farhan Akhtar	Nominated	
International Indian Film Academy Awards	6 April 2002	Best Actor	Aamir Khan	Nominated	
International Indian Film Academy Awards	6 April 2002	Best Actress	Preity Zinta	Nominated	
International Indian Film Academy Awards	6 April 2002	Best Supporting Actor	Akshaye Khanna	Nominated	
International Indian Film Academy Awards	6 April 2002	Best Supporting Actor	Saif Ali Khan	Won	
International Indian Film Academy Awards	6 April 2002	Best Music Director	Shankar–Ehsaan–Loy	Nominated	
International Indian Film Academy Awards	6 April 2002	Best Lyricist	Javed Akhtar (for "Jaane Kyon")	Nominated	
International Indian Film Academy Awards	6 April 2002	Best Playback Singer – Male	Srinivas (for "Kaisi Ha Ye Rut")	Nominated	
International Indian Film Academy Awards	6 April 2002	Best Playback Singer – Female	Alka Yagnik (for "Jaane Kyon")	Nominated	
International Indian Film Academy Awards	6 April 2002	Best Story	Farhan Akhtar	Nominated	
International Indian Film Academy Awards	6 April 2002	Best Screenplay	Farhan Akhtar	Won	
International Indian Film Academy Awards	6 April 2002	Best Choreography	Farah Khan (for "Woh Ladki Hai Kahan")	Won	
International Indian Film Academy Awards	6 April 2002	Best Song Recording	Vijay Benegal	Won	
National Film Awards	29 June 2002	Best Feature Film in Hindi	Dil Chahta Hai	Won	
National Film Awards	29 June 2002	Best Male Playback Singer	Udit Narayan (for "Jaane Kyon")	Won	
Screen Awards	18 January 2002	Best Film	Dil Chahta Hai	Nominated	
Screen Awards	18 January 2002	Best Director	Farhan Akhtar	Nominated	
Screen Awards	18 January 2002	Best Actor	Aamir Khan	Nominated	
Screen Awards	18 January 2002	Best Supporting Actor	Akshaye Khanna	Nominated	
Screen Awards	18 January 2002	Best Supporting Actor	Saif Ali Khan	Won	
Screen Awards	18 January 2002	Best Music Director	Shankar–Ehsaan–Loy	Won	
Screen Awards	18 January 2002	Best Background Music	Shankar–Ehsaan–Loy	Nominated	
Screen Awards	18 January 2002	Best Lyricist	Javed Akhtar (for "Jaane Kyon")	Won	
Screen Awards	18 January 2002	Best Playback Singer – Male	Sonu Nigam (for "Tanhayee")	Won	
Screen Awards	18 January 2002	Best Playback Singer – Male	Srinivas (for "Kaisi Ha Ye Rut")	Nominated	
Screen Awards	18 January 2002	Special Jury Award	Farhan Akhtar, Akshaye Khanna	Won	
Screen Awards	18 January 2002	Best Dialogue	Farhan Akhtar	Won	
Screen Awards	18 January 2002	Best Choreography	Farah Khan (for "Woh Ladki Hai Kahan")	Won	
Screen Awards	18 January 2002	Best Special Effects	A. Sreekar Prasad	Won	
Screen Awards	18 January 2002	Jodi No. 1	Aamir Khan & Preity Zinta	Nominated	
Zee Cine Awards	11 January 2002	Best Actor in a Supporting Role – Male	Saif Ali Khan	Won	
Zee Cine Awards	11 January 2002	Most Promising Director	Farhan Akhtar	Won	
