= Tabu filmography =

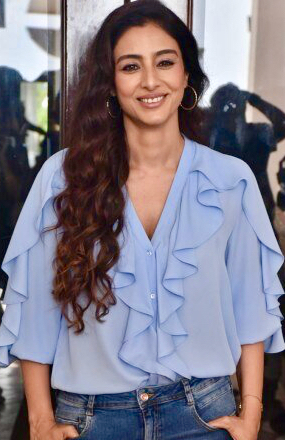
Tabu at an event for De De Pyaar De in 2019

Tabu is an Indian actress that appears primarily in Hindi and Telugu films. Her first credited role came as a teenager in Dev Anand's Hum Naujawan (1985), and her first major role was in the Telugu film Coolie No. 1 (1991). In 1994, Tabu received the Filmfare Award for Best Female Debut for the Hindi action drama Vijaypath, which marked her first of many collaborations with co-star Ajay Devgn. The year 1996 was key for Tabu. Her performance as a young woman affected by the Punjab insurgency in Gulzar's Maachis proved to be a breakthrough, winning her the National Film Award for Best Actress. Also that year, Tabu won the Filmfare Award for Best Actress – Telugu for the romance Ninne Pelladata, and featured alongside Govinda in the comedy film Saajan Chale Sasural.

Tabu had a brief role in the war film Border, the highest-grossing Hindi film of 1997, and portrayed a village girl opposite Anil Kapoor in the Priyadarshan-directed drama Virasat. Among her 1999 releases were two of the top-grossing Bollywood films of the year—the comedy Biwi No.1, and the family drama Hum Saath-Saath Hain. She also starred as the rebellious daughter of a corrupt politician in Gulzar's critically praised drama Hu Tu Tu (1999). The following year, she starred in Kandukondain Kandukondain, a Tamil adaptation of Sense and Sensibility, and played a submissive homemaker in the bilingual drama Astitva. Tabu garnered a second National Film Award for Best Actress for portraying a bar dancer in Madhur Bhandarkar's crime drama Chandni Bar (2001). In 2003, she starred in the Bengali film Abar Aranye, and portrayed a character based on Lady Macbeth, in Maqbool—an adaptation of Macbeth from Vishal Bhardwaj. Following a few commercial failures, Tabu played multiple roles in M. F. Husain's musical drama Meenaxi: Tale of Three Cities. Tabu's first international project came with Mira Nair's adaptation of Jhumpa Lahiri's novel The Namesake. In R. Balki's Cheeni Kum (2007), Tabu starred alongside Amitabh Bachchan as a woman romantically involved with a much older man; the role earned her a record fourth Filmfare Critics Award for Best Actress. (Note: Tabu had previously won the award for Virasat, Hu Tu Tu and Astitva.)

Following a brief role in Ang Lee's adventure film Life of Pi (2012), Tabu starred alongside Salman Khan in Jai Ho, and garnered critical acclaim for playing the Gertrude character in Bhardwaj's Haider. She won the Filmfare Award for Best Supporting Actress for the latter. Tabu's career continued to expand with starring roles opposite Devgn in the thriller Drishyam (2015), the horror comedy Golmaal Again (2017), and the romantic comedy De De Pyaar De (2019). She gained acclaim for playing a murderess in Andhadhun (2018), which ranks as one of the highest-grossing Indian films. In 2020, she featured in the top-grossing Telugu film Ala Vaikunthapurramuloo, winning the Filmfare Award for Best Supporting Actress – Telugu, and starred in the British miniseries A Suitable Boy. Further commercial successes came in 2022 with the sequels Drishyam 2 and Bhool Bhulaiyaa 2 and the heist comedy Crew (2024). Bhool Bhulaiyaa 2 won her another Filmfare Critics Award for Best Actress.

== Films ==
Key
†	Denotes films that have not yet been released

List of Tabu film credits
Year	Title	Role(s)	Language(s)	Notes	Notes
1982	Bazaar	Unnamed	Hindi	Uncredited appearance in the song "Chale Aao Saiyan"	
1985	Hum Naujawan	Priya	Hindi		
1991	Coolie No. 1	Ranjani	Telugu		
1994	Pehla Pehla Pyar	Sapna	Hindi		
1994	Vijaypath	Mohini / Vrushali	Hindi		
1995	Prem	Laachi / Sonia (Note: Tabu played dual roles in the film.)	Hindi		
1995	Saajan Ki Baahon Mein	Kavita Verma	Hindi		
1995	Sisindri	Herself	Telugu	Cameo appearance	
1995	Haqeeqat	Sudha Singh	Hindi		
1996	Himmat	Anjali Pathak	Hindi		
1996	Kadhal Desam	Divya	Tamil		
1996	Tu Chor Main Sipahi	Kajal	Hindi		
1996	Jeet	Tulsibai	Hindi		
1996	Kaalapani	Parvathi	Malayalam		
1996	Maachis	Veerandar	Hindi		
1996	Saajan Chale Sasural	Divya Khurana	Hindi		
1996	Ninne Pelladata	Mahalakshmi	Telugu		
1997	Darmiyaan: In Between	Chitra	Hindi		
1997	Virasat	Gehna Rane	Hindi		
1997	Border	Yamora Kaur	Hindi		
1997	Iruvar	Senthamarai	Tamil		
1997	Chachi 420	Janki Paswan	Hindi		
1998	Aavida Maa Aavide	Archana	Telugu		
1998	2001: Do Hazaar Ek	Billu	Hindi		
1998	Thayin Manikodi	Anjali	Tamil		
1998	Hanuman	Anja	English	French-Indian film	
1999	Hu Tu Tu	Parveen "Panna"	Hindi		
1999	Biwi No.1	Lovely Khurana	Hindi		
1999	Kohram	ACP Kiran Patkar	Hindi		
1999	Hum Saath-Saath Hain	Sadhna Sharma Chaturvedi	Hindi		
1999	Thakshak	Suman Dev	Hindi		
2000	Hera Pheri	Anuradha Panikar	Hindi		
2000	Kandukondain Kandukondain	Sowmya	Tamil		
2000	Tarkieb	Roshni Choubey	Hindi		
2000	Dil Pe Mat Le Yaar	Kamya Lal	Hindi		
2000	Shikari	Suman	Hindi		
2000	Astitva	Aditi Pandit	Hindi		
2000	Astitva	Aditi Pandit	Marathi (Note: Bilingual film)		
2000	Ghaath	Kavita Choudhary	Hindi		
2000	Snegithiye	ACP Gayatri Varma	Tamil	Released in Malayalam in 2007 as Raakilipattu	
2000	Cover Story	Jasmine Khan	Malayalam		
2001	Dil Ne Phir Yaad Kiya	Roshni Batra	Hindi		
2001	Chandni Bar	Mumtaz	Hindi		
2001	Aamdani Atthani Kharcha Rupaiyaa	Meena	Hindi		
2002	Maa Tujhhe Salaam	Captain Sonia Khanna	Hindi		
2002	Filhaal...	Rewa Singh	Hindi		
2002	Chennakesava Reddy	Devi	Telugu		
2002	Zindagi Khoobsoorat Hai	Shalu	Hindi		
2002	Saathiya	Savitri Rao	Hindi	Cameo appearance	
2003	Abar Aranye	Amrita	Bengali		
2003	Khanjar	Shilpa	Hindi		
2003	Hawa	Sanjana	Hindi		
2003	Jaal	Neha Pandit	Hindi		
2003	Maqbool	Nimmi	Hindi		
2004	Main Hoon Na	Aparna	Hindi	Cameo appearance	
2004	Meenaxi: Tale of Three Cities	Meenaxi / Maria Zarkova / Tanu (Note: Tabu played multiple roles in the film.)	Hindi		
2005	Bhagmati – The Queen of Fortunes	Shivranjani / Bhagmati	Hindi		
2005	Andarivaadu	Shanthi	Telugu		
2005	Silsiilay	Rehana	Hindi		
2006	Shock	Gita	Telugu		
2006	Fanaa	Malini Tyagi	Hindi		
2007	The Namesake	Ashima	English		
2007	Sarhad Paar	Pammi	Hindi		
2007	Cheeni Kum	Nina Verma	Hindi		
2007	Om Shanti Om	Herself	Hindi	Special appearance in the song "Deewangi Deewangi"	
2008	Idi Sangathi	Swarajyalakshmi	Telugu		
2008	Pandurangadu	Amrutha	Telugu		
2010	Toh Baat Pakki!	Rajeshwari Saxena	Hindi		
2010	Khuda Kasam	Neetu Singh	Hindi	Delayed release	
2011	Urumi	Herself	Malayalam	Special appearance in the song "Aaranne Aaranne"	
2012	Life of Pi	Gita Patel	English		
2013	David	Frenny	Hindi	Simultaneously shot and released in Tamil under the same title (Note: Her scenes were dubbed from the Hindi version.)	
2014	Jai Ho	Geeta Agnihotri Khanna	Hindi		
2014	Haider	Ghazala Meer	Hindi	Also playback singer for the song "Roshe Valle"	
2015	Drishyam	IG Meera Deshmukh	Hindi		
2015	Talvar	Reema Kumar	Hindi	Cameo appearance	
2016	Fitoor	Begum Hazrat Jaan	Hindi		
2017	Golmaal Again	Anna Matthew	Hindi		
2018	Missing	Aparna Dubey	Hindi	Also playback singer for the song "Soja Re"	
2018	Sanju	Herself	Hindi	Cameo appearance	
2018	Andhadhun	Simi Sinha	Hindi		
2019	De De Pyaar De	Manjana "Manju" Rao Mehra	Hindi		
2019	Bharat	Meher / Gudiya Kumar (Note: Tabu played a single character with two or more names.)	Hindi	Cameo appearance	
2020	Ala Vaikunthapurramuloo	Yasoda "Yasu"	Telugu		
2020	Jawaani Jaaneman	Ananya	Hindi		
2022	Bhool Bhulaiyaa 2	Manjulika / Anjulika (Note: Tabu played dual roles in the film.)	Hindi		
2022	Drishyam 2	Meera Deshmukh	Hindi		
2023	Kuttey	Poonam "Pammi" Sandhu	Hindi		
2023	Bholaa	Diana Joseph	Hindi		
2023	Khufiya	Krishna Mehra	Hindi		
2024	Crew	Geeta Sethi	Hindi		
2024	Auron Mein Kahan Dum Tha	Vasudha Chaudhary	Hindi		
2026	Bhooth Bangla	Yashoda	Hindi		
2026	Drishyam: The Conclusion	Meera Deshmukh	Hindi		
TBA	Slumdog: 33 Temple Road †	Gauri Hegde	Telugu	Filming	
TBA	King 100 †	Mahanthi Jhansi Rani	Telugu	Announced	

== Television ==
List of Tabu television credits
Year	Title	Role	Language	Notes	Ref.
2019	Thriller Factory	Divya (voice)	Hindi	Audio series	
2020	A Suitable Boy	Saaeda Bai	English	Miniseries	
2024	Dune: Prophecy	Sister Francesca	English	TV series	

== See also ==
- List of awards and nominations received by Tabu
