= 3rd IIFA Awards =

Indian film award ceremony in 2002

- Date: 6 April 2002
- Site: Arena of Stars, Genting Highlands, Malaysia
- Hosted by: Lara Dutta

Highlights
- Best Picture: Lagaan
- Best Direction: Ashutosh Gowariker (Lagaan)
- Best Actor: Aamir Khan (Lagaan)
- Best Actress: Tabu (Chandni Bar)
- Most awards: Lagaan (10)
- Most nominations: Kabhi Khushi Kabhie Gham (18)

The 2002 IIFA Awards, officially known as the 3rd International Indian Film Academy Awards ceremony, presented by the International Indian Film Academy honored the best films of 2001 and took place on 6 April 2002.

The official ceremony took place on 6 April 2002, at the Genting Highlands, in Arena of Stars. During the ceremony, IIFA Awards were awarded in 29 competitive categories.

The IIFA Weekend started with a Press Meet. Attended by the stars, the event received extensive coverage from world media. The same evening saw the music launch of Kaante. The IIFA Karaoke Party gave film stars and high-profile guests a chance to let their hair down.

IIFA hosted the World Premiere of the film Aankhen at the Genting International Showroom. Malaysia witnessed the first ever IIFA Forum. The focus was on the emerging perspectives of Indian Cinema, the exchange of technology and talent. The speakers included Ashutosh Gowarikar, Karan Johar, Farhan Akhtar and Madhur Bhandarkar.

Kabhi Khushi Kabhie Gham led the ceremony with 18 nominations, followed by Lagaan with 12 nominations, Dil Chahta Hai with 11 nominations, and Gadar: Ek Prem Katha with 10 nominations.

Lagaan won 10 awards, including Best Film, Best Director (for Ashutosh Gowariker), and Best Actor (for Aamir Khan), thus becoming the most-awarded film at the ceremony.

Aamir Khan received dual nominations for Best Actor for his performances in Dil Chahta Hai and Lagaan, winning for the latter.

== Winners and nominees ==
Winners are listed first and highlighted in boldface.

=== Popular awards ===
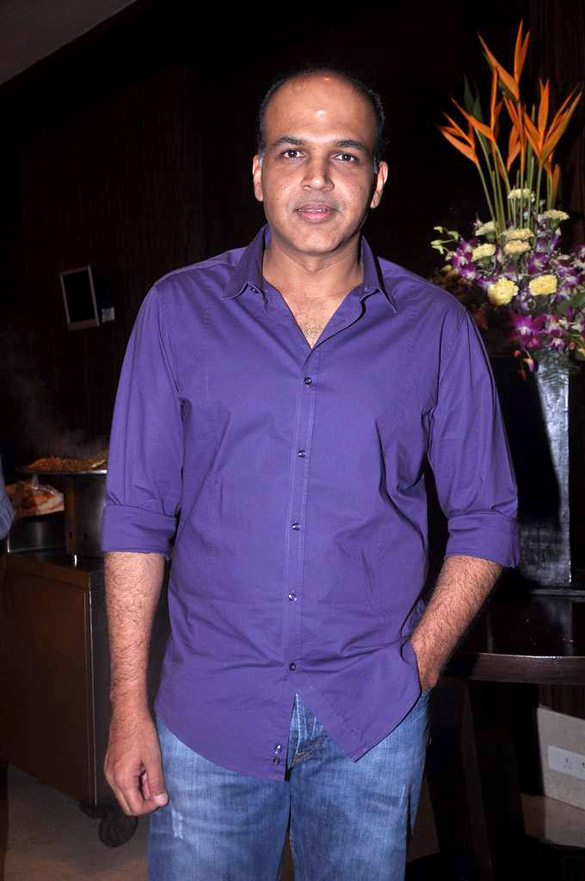
Ashutosh Gowariker (Best Director)

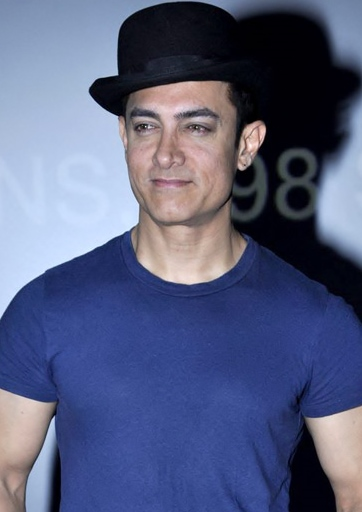
Aamir Khan (Best Actor)

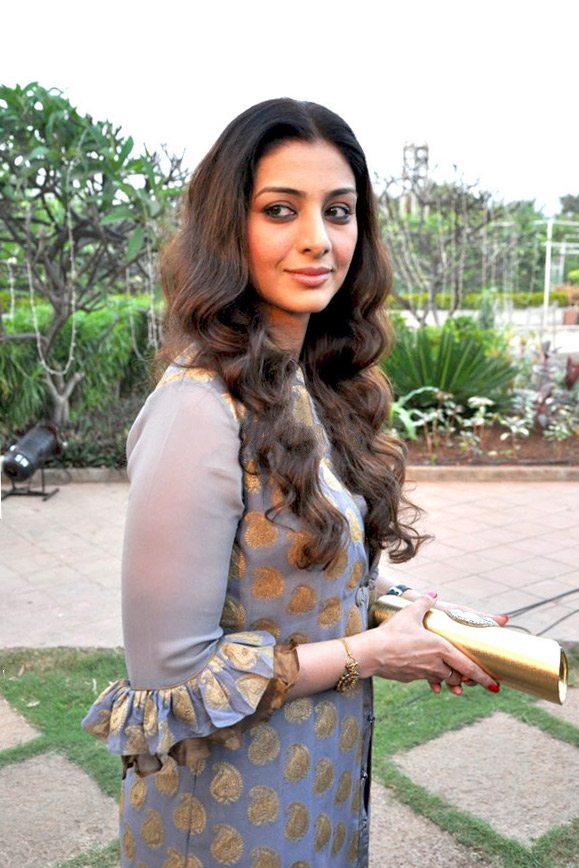
Tabu(Best Actress)

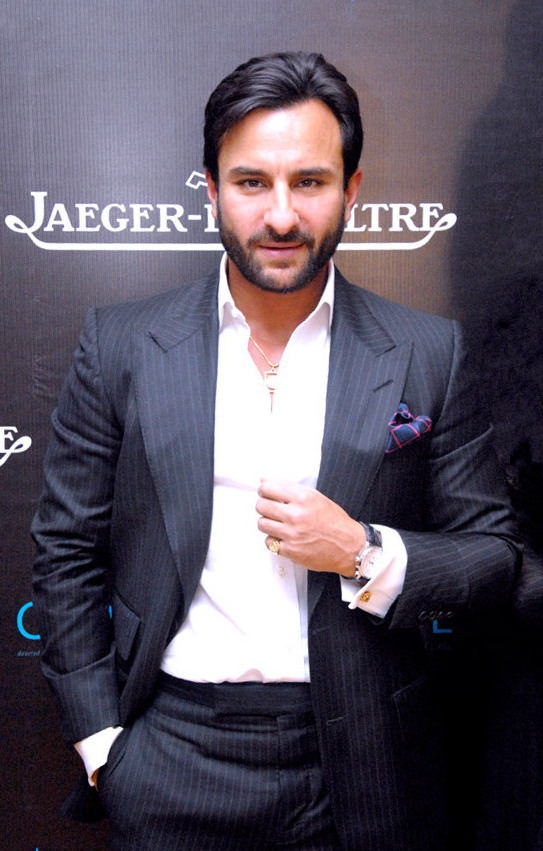
Saif Ali Khan(Best Supporting Actor)

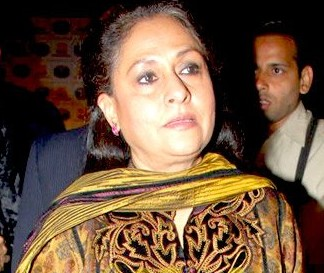
Jaya Bachchan (Best Supporting Actress)

| Best Film | Best Director |
|---|---|
| **Lagaan**; Chandni Bar; Dil Chahta Hai; Gadar: Ek Prem Katha; Kabhi Khushi Kabhie Gham | **Ashutosh Gowariker – Lagaan**; Anil Sharma – Gadar: Ek Prem Katha; Farhan Akhtar – Dil Chahta Hai; Karan Johar – Kabhi Khushi Kabhie Gham; Madhur Bhandarkar – Chandni Bar |
| Best Performance In A Leading Role Male | Best Performance In A Leading Role Female |
| **Aamir Khan – Lagaan as Bhuvan**; Aamir Khan – Dil Chahta Hai as Akash Malhotra; Amitabh Bachchan – Aks as Inspector Manu Verma; Shah Rukh Khan – Kabhi Khushi Kabhie Gham as Rahul Raichand; Sunny Deol – Gadar: Ek Prem Katha as Tara Singh | **Tabu – Chandni Bar as Mumtaz Ali Ansari**; Ameesha Patel – Gadar: Ek Prem Katha as Sakina; Gracy Singh – Lagaan as Gauri; Kajol – Kabhi Khushi Kabhie Gham as Anjali Sharma; Preity Zinta – Dil Chahta Hai as Shalini |
| Best Performance In A Supporting Role Male | Best Performance In A Supporting Role Female |
| **Saif Ali Khan – Dil Chahta Hai as Sameer**; Amitabh Bachchan – Kabhi Khushi Kabhie Gham as Yashvardhan Raichand; Akshaye Khanna – Dil Chahta Hai as Siddharth Sinha; Hrithik Roshan – Kabhi Khushi Kabhie Gham as Rohan Raichand; Kulbhushan Kharbanda – Lagaan as Raja Puran Singh | **Jaya Bachchan – Kabhi Khushi Kabhie Gham as Nandini Raichand**; Bipasha Basu – Ajnabee as Neeta (Fake Sonia); Kareena Kapoor – Kabhi Khushi Kabhie Gham as Pooja Sharma a.k.a. Poo; Madhuri Dixit – Lajja as Janki; Rekha – Lajja as Ramdulaari |
| Best Performance In A Comic Role | Best Performance In A Negative Role |
| **Govinda – Jodi No. 1**; Johnny Lever – Ajnabee; Johnny Lever – Kabhi Khushi Kabhie Gham; Rajesh Vivek – Lagaan; Vivek Shaq – Gadar: Ek Prem Katha | **Akshay Kumar – Ajnabee**; Amrish Puri – Gadar: Ek Prem Katha; Manoj Bajpayee – Aks; Paul Blackthorne – Lagaan; Suhas Palshikar – Chandni Bar |
| Male Debutant Star | Female Debutant Star |
| **Arjun Rampal – Pyaar Ishq Aur Mohabbat** | **Bipasha Basu – Ajnabee**; **Gracy Singh – Lagaan** |

=== Musical awards ===
| Best Music Director | Best Lyrics |
|---|---|
| **A. R. Rahman – Lagaan**; A. R. Rahman – Zubeidaa; Aadesh Shrivastava, Jatin–Lalit, Sandesh Shandilya – Kabhi Khushi Kabhie Gham; Shankar–Ehsaan–Loy – Dil Chahta Hai; Uttam Singh – Gadar: Ek Prem Katha | **"Radha Kaise Na Jale" from Lagaan – Javed Akhtar**; "Kabhi Khushi Kabhie Gham" from Kabhi Khushi Kabhie Gham – Sameer; "Suraj Hua Madham" from Kabhi Khushi Kabhie Gham – Anil Pandey; "So Gaya Hai" from Zubeidaa – Javed Akhtar; "Jaane Kyun" from Dil Chahta Hai – Javed Akhtar; "Ud Jaa Kale Kawa" from Gadar: Ek Prem Katha – Anand Bakshi |
| Best Male Playback Singer | Best Female Playback Singer |
| **Sonu Nigam for "Suraj Hua Maddham" – Kabhi Khushi Kabhie Gham**; Sonu Nigam for "You Are My Soniya" – Kabhi Khushi Kabhie Gham; Srinivas for "Kaisi Hai Yeh Rut" – Dil Chahta Hai; Udit Narayan for "Bole Chudiyan" – Kabhi Khushi Kabhie Gham; Udit Narayan for "Mitwa" - Lagaan; Udit Narayan for "Udja Kale Kawan – Folk" - Gadar: Ek Prem Katha | **Asha Bhosle for "Radha Kaisa Na Jale" – Lagaan**; Alka Yagnik for "Jaane Kyun" – Dil Chahta Hai; Alka Yagnik for "Bole Chudiyan" – Kabhi Khushi Kabhie Gham; Alka Yagnik for "Suraj Hua Maddham" – Kabhi Khushi Kabhie Gham; Lata Mangeshkar for "So Gaye Hain" – Zubeidaa |
| Best Song Recording | Best Background score |
| **Dil Chahta Hai – Vijay Benegal** | **Kabhi Khushi Kabhie Gham – Babloo Chakravarthy** |

=== Backstage awards ===
| Best Dialogue | Best Screenplay |
|---|---|
| **Shaktimaan Talwar for Gadar: Ek Prem Katha and Karan Johar for Kabhi Khushi Kabhie Gham** | **Farhan Akhtar for Dil Chahta Hai** |
Best Story
**Ashutosh Gowariker – Lagaan**; Farhan Akhtar – Dil Chahta Hai; Karan Johar – Kabhi Khushi Kabhie Gham; Madhur Bhandarkar – Chandni Bar; Shaktimaan Talwar – Gadar: Ek Prem Katha

=== Technical awards ===
| Best Cinematographer | Best Choreography |
|---|---|
| **Santosh Sivan – Asoka** | **Farah Khan – Dil Chahta Hai** |
| Best Costume Design | Best Editing |
| **Kabhi Khushi Kabhie Gham** – Manish Malhotra | **Lagaan – Ballu Saluja** |
| Best Makeup | Best Sound Recording |
| **Kabhi Khushi Kabhie Gham – Mickey Contractor** | **Kabhi Khushi Kabhie Gham – Anuj Mathur & Nakul Kamte** |
| Best Sound Re-Recording | Best Special Effects |
| **Lagaan – H. Sridhar** | **Aks – Paul Sims** |
| Best Art Direction | Best Action |
| **Kabhi Khushi Kabhie Gham – Sharmista Roy** | **Gadar: Ek Prem Katha – Tinu Verma** |

=== Special awards ===
==== Outstanding Contribution to Indian Cinema ====
- Sadhana

==== Outstanding Contribution In Indian Cinema ====
- Yash Chopra

==== Outstanding Achievement in International Cinema ====
- Mira Nair

==== Electrolux Kelvinator Personality of The Year ====
- Amitabh Bachchan

==== Sony Faces Of The Year ====
- Arjun Rampal
- Bipasha Basu
- Gracy Singh

== Superlatives ==
Films with multiple nominations
| Nominations | Film |
|---|---|
| 18 | Kabhi Khushi Kabhie Gham |
| 12 | Lagaan |
| 11 | Dil Chahta Hai |
| 10 | Gadar: Ek Prem Katha |
| 5 | Chandni Bar |
| 3 | Ajnabee |
| 3 | Zubeidaa |
| 2 | Aks |
| 2 | Lajja |

Films with multiple awards
| Awards | Film |
|---|---|
| 10 | Lagaan |
| 8 | Kabhi Khushi Kabhie Gham |
| 4 | Dil Chahta Hai |
| 2 | Ajnabee |
