= 47th Filmfare Awards =

2002 awards for Hindi cinema

- Date: 16 February 2002
- Hosted by: Jaaved Jaaferi; Archana Puran Singh
- Official website: www.filmfare.com

Highlights
- Best Film: Lagaan
- Best Critic: Dil Chahta Hai
- Most awards: Lagaan (8)
- Most nominations: Kabhi Khushi Kabhie Gham (16)

Television coverage
- Network: Sony Entertainment Television (India)

The 47th Filmfare Awards for Hindi cinema were held on 16 February 2002 in Mumbai, India.

Kabhi Khushi Kabhie Gham led the ceremony with 16 nominations, followed by Dil Chahta Hai with 13 nominations, Gadar: Ek Prem Katha with 9 nominations and Lagaan with 8 nominations.

Lagaan won all 8 awards, including Best Film, Best Director (for Ashutosh Gowariker) and Best Actor (for Aamir Khan), thus becoming the most-awarded film at the ceremony.

Aamir Khan received dual nominations for Best Actor for his performances in Dil Chahta Hai and Lagaan, winning for the latter.

Sisters Kareena Kapoor and Karisma Kapoor were nominated for Best Actress for their performances in Aśoka and Zubeidaa respectively, but both lost to Kajol who won the award for Kabhi Khushi Kabhie Gham.

== Awards ==
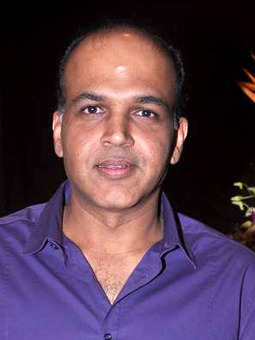
Ashutosh Gowariker — Best Director winner

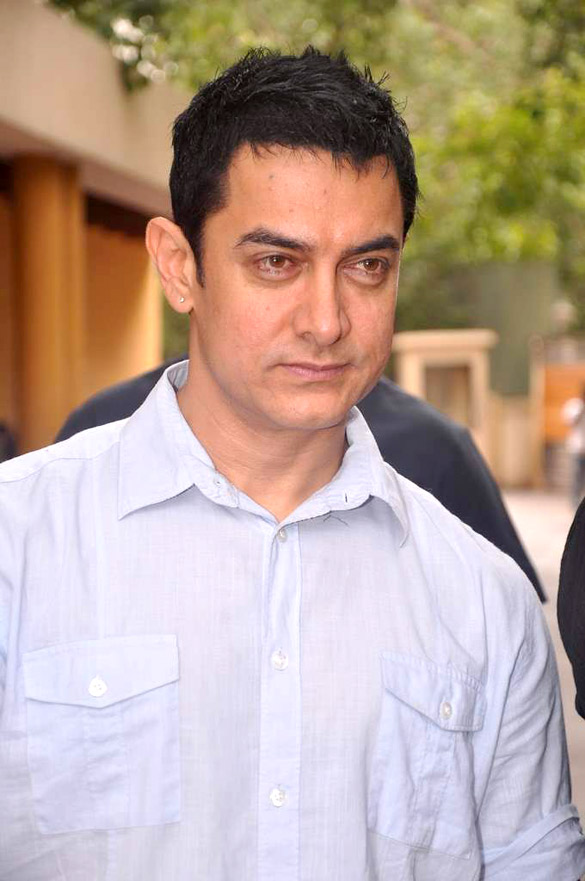
Aamir Khan — Best Actor winner

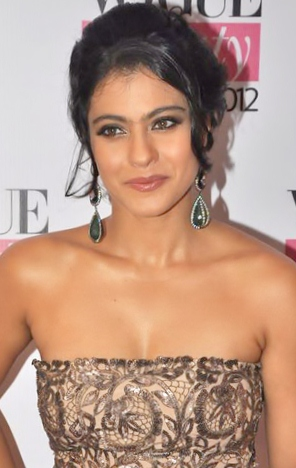
Kajol — Best Actress winner

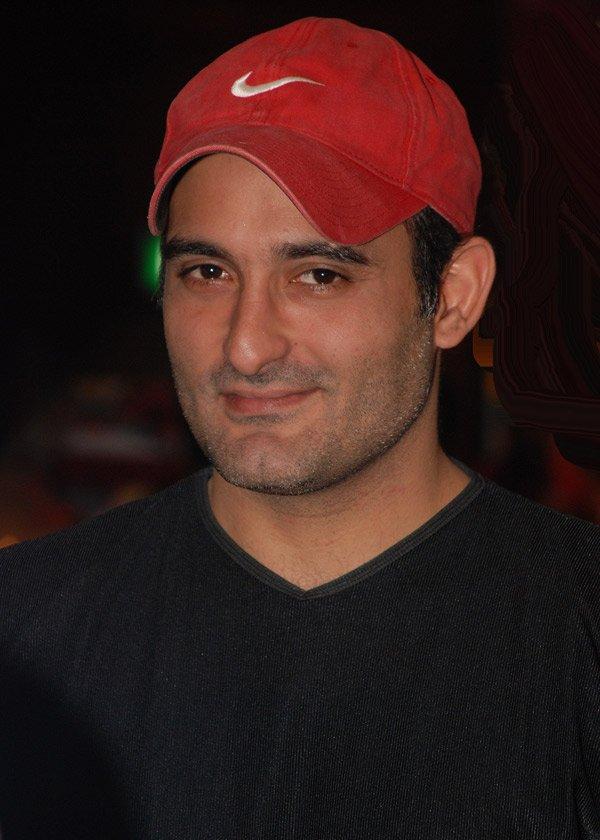
Akshaye Khanna — Best Supporting Actor winner

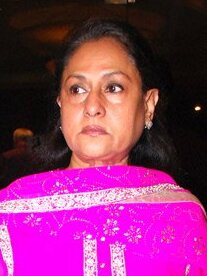
Jaya Bachchan — Best Supporting Actress winner

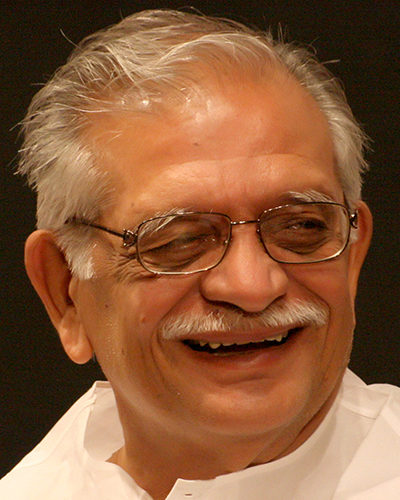
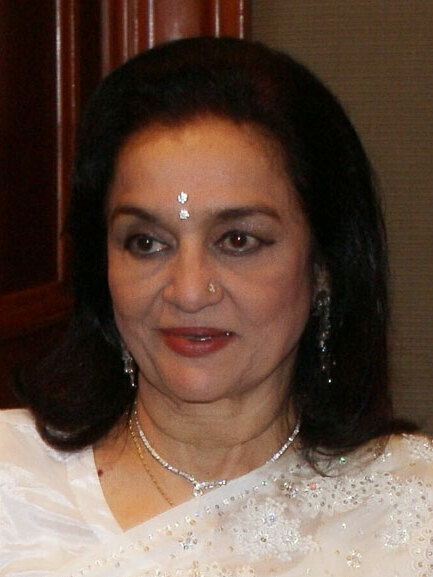
Gulzar and Asha Parekh, Lifetime Achievement Awardees

The winners and nominees are listed below. The winners are listed first, highlighted in boldface.

=== Main awards ===
Best Film	Best Director
**Lagaan**; Asoka; Dil Chahta Hai; Gadar: Ek Prem Katha; Kabhi Khushi Kabhie Gham	**Ashutosh Gowariker – Lagaan**; Anil Sharma – Gadar: Ek Prem Katha; Farhan Akhtar – Dil Chahta Hai; Karan Johar – Kabhi Khushi Kabhie Gham; Santosh Sivan – Asoka
Best Actor	Best Actress
**Aamir Khan – Lagaan**; Aamir Khan – Dil Chahta Hai; Amitabh Bachchan – Aks; Shah Rukh Khan – Kabhi Khushi Kabhie Gham; Sunny Deol – Gadar: Ek Prem Katha	**Kajol – Kabhi Khushi Kabhie Gham**; Amisha Patel – Gadar: Ek Prem Katha; Kareena Kapoor – Asoka; Karisma Kapoor – Zubeidaa; Tabu – Chandni Bar
Best Supporting Actor	Best Supporting Actress
**Akshaye Khanna – Dil Chahta Hai**; Ajay Devgan – Lajja; Amitabh Bachchan – Kabhi Khushi Kabhie Gham; Hrithik Roshan – Kabhi Khushi Kabhie Gham; Jackie Shroff – Yaadein	**Jaya Bachchan – Kabhi Khushi Kabhie Gham**; Kareena Kapoor – Kabhi Khushi Kabhie Gham; Madhuri Dixit – Lajja; Preity Zinta – Chori Chori Chupke Chupke; Rekha – Lajja
Best Male Debut	Best Female Debut
**Tusshar Kapoor – Mujhe Kucch Kehna Hai**	**Bipasha Basu – Ajnabee**
Best Comic Role	Best Negative Role
**Saif Ali Khan – Dil Chahta Hai**; Govinda – Jodi No.1; Govinda – Kyo Kii... Main Jhuth Nahin Bolta; Johnny Lever – Ajnabee; Paresh Rawal – Yeh Teraa Ghar Yeh Meraa Ghar	**Akshay Kumar – Ajnabee**; Aftab Shivdasani – Kasoor; Amrish Puri – Gadar: Ek Prem Katha; Manoj Bajpai – Aks; Urmila Matondkar – Pyaar Tune Kya Kiya
Best Music Director	Best Lyricist
**Lagaan – A. R. Rahman**; Dil Chahta Hai – Shankar–Ehsaan–Loy; Gadar: Ek Prem Katha – Uttam Singh; Kabhi Khushi Kabhie Gham – Jatin-Lalit; Mujhe Kucch Kehna Hai – Anu Malik	**Lagaan – Javed Akhtar for Radha Kaise Na Jale**; Gadar: Ek Prem Katha – Anand Bakshi for Udja Kaale Kawaan; Kabhi Khushi Kabhie Gham – Anil Pandey for Suraj Hua Maddham; Kabhi Khushi Kabhie Gham – Sameer for Kabhi Khushi Kabhie Gham; Lagaan – Javed Akhtar for Mitwa
Best Playback Singer – Male	Best Playback Singer – Female
**Lagaan – Udit Narayan for Mitwa**; Ajnabee – Adnan Sami for Mehbooba; Dil Chahta Hai – Shaan for Koi Kahe Kehta Rahe; Gadar: Ek Prem Katha – Udit Narayan for Udja Kaale Kawaan; Kabhi Khushi Kabhie Gham – Sonu Nigam for Suraj Hua Maddham	**Lagaan – Alka Yagnik for O Re Chhori**; Aks – Vasundhara Das for Rabba Rabba; Asoka – Alka Yagnik for San Sanana; Dil Chahta Hai – Alka Yagnik for Jaane Kyun; Kabhi Khushi Kabhie Gham – Alka Yagnik for Suraj Hua Maddham; Zubeidaa – Kavita Krishnamurthy for Dheeme Dheeme

=== Technical Awards ===
Best Story	Best Screenplay
Lagaan – Ashutosh Gowariker	**Dil Chahta Hai – Farhan Akhtar**
Best Dialogue	Scene of the Year
Kabhi Khushi Kabhie Gham – Karan Johar	**Kabhi Khushi Kabhie Gham**
Best Action	Best Choreography
Gadar: Ek Prem Katha – Tinnu Verma	**Dil Chahta Hai – Farah Khan for Woh Ladki Hai Kahaan**
Best Cinematography	Best Art Direction
Asoka – Santosh Sivan	**Kabhi Khushi Kabhie Gham – Sharmishta Roy**
Best Background Score	Best Editing
Aks – Ranjit Barot	**Dil Chahta Hai – A. Sreekar Prasad**
Best Sound
Aks – Rakesh Ranjan

==== Special awards ====
Filmfare Special Award
- **Raveena Tandon for Aks**
- **Amisha Patel for Gadar: Ek Prem Katha**
Lifetime Achievement Award
- **Gulzar**
- **Asha Parekh**
RD Burman Award
- **Shankar–Ehsaan–Loy – Dil Chahta Hai**

=== Best Film ===
Dil Chahta Hai

=== Best Actor ===
Amitabh Bachchan – Aks

=== Best Actress ===
Karisma Kapoor – Zubeidaa

== Big winners and nominees ==
The following film received multiple nominations.

- 16 nominations: Kabhi Khushi Kabhie Gham
- 13 nominations: Dil Chahta Hai
- 9 nominations: Gadar: Ek Prem Katha
- 8 nominations: Lagaan
- 6 nominations: Aks
- 5 nominations: Asoka
- 4 nominations: Ajnabee
- 2 nominations: Zubeidaa

The following film received multiple awards.

- 8 wins: Lagaan
- 7 wins: Dil Chahta Hai
- 5 wins: Kabhi Khushi Kabhie Gham
- 4 wins: Aks
- 2 wins: Ajnabee & Gadar: Ek Prem Katha

== See also ==
- Filmfare Awards
