= Why Do Fools Fall in Love =

Why Do Fools Fall in Love may refer to:

- "Why Do Fools Fall in Love" (song), a 1956 song by doo-wop group Frankie Lymon & the Teenagers
- Why Do Fools Fall in Love (album), a 1981 album by American singer Diana Ross
- Why Do Fools Fall in Love (film), a 1998 film starring Halle Berry, Vivica A. Fox, Lela Rochon and Larenz Tate
- "Jaane Kyon" (transl. Why Do People Love), a song from the 2001 Indian film Dil Chahta Hai
