= Ananya Khare =

Indian television actress

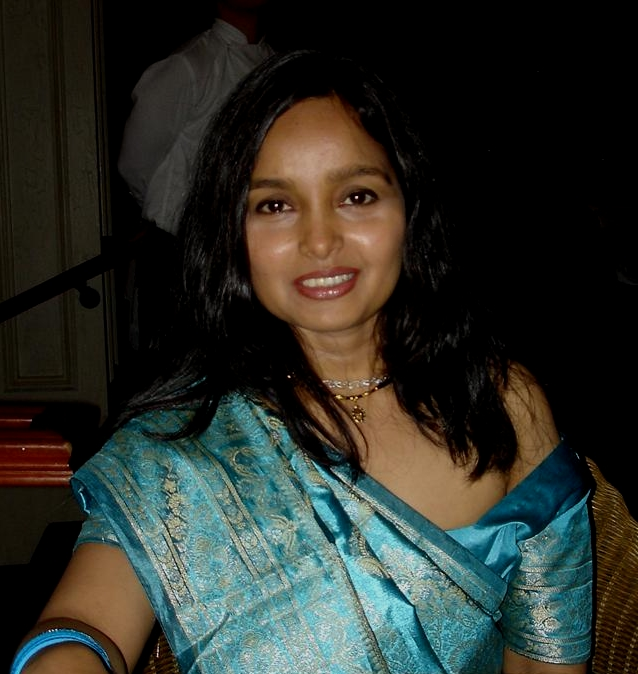
- Born: Ratlam, Madhya Pradesh, India
- Occupation: Actress
- Years active: 1994–present

Ananya Khare is an Indian actress known for her roles in Bollywood films like Devdas and Chandni Bar. She won the National Film Award for Best Supporting Actress for her performance in the movie Chandni Bar.

== Personal life ==
Khare took a break and shifted to the US in 2005 after she met her husband, David. She worked as an English teacher in a school before the couple decided to shift base back to Mumbai after 10 years.

== Career ==
She first made her mark on television in serials including 1987's Nirmala for almost two decades before her big-screen success. She was awarded an Indian National Award for best-supporting actress for her role in Chandni Bar and subsequently nominated for her role in Devdas. She has been awarded for her roles on stage, television, and on the big screen.

More recently, Khare has gained popularity by being back on television and mostly being cast in negative roles on popular soap operas. In 2020, Ananya played the character Benazir Abdullah in the ALTBalaji series Bebaakee.

== Filmography ==
=== Films ===
Year	Serial	Role
1994	Zaalim	Kaamna
1999	Shool	Bachoo Yadav's wife
2001	Chandni Bar	Deepa Pandey, Bar Dancer
2002	Devdas	Kumud Mukherjee, Devdas's Sister-in-law
2005	The Film	Nandhini
2010	Foreign	Geeta
2019	Sab Kushal Mangal	Bua
2021	Pagglait	Rashmi Giri

=== Television ===
Year	Serial	Role	Channel
1984	Hum Log		
1987	Nirmala		
1991	Phatichar	Mala	
1993	Dekh Bhai Dekh	Zubeida (Cameo)	DD National
1993	Kirdaar	Malti	DD National
1995–1997	Yeh Shaadi Nahi Ho Sakti	Baby	Sony Entertainment Television
1995–1997	O Maria	Baby	Sony Entertainment Television
1995	Aahat	Juhi	Sony Entertainment Television
1997–1998	Mahayagya		Sony Entertainment Television
1998	Movers & Shakers	Herself	Sony Entertainment Television
2002	CID	Episodic Role	Sony Entertainment Television
2000	Kasamm		DD National
2012	Meri Maa		Life OK
2012–2013	Punar Vivah	Maya	Zee TV
2013	Amrit Manthan	Indu Chhabria	Life OK
2013	Yeh Hai Aashiqui	Episodic Role	Bindass
2013–2014	Rangrasiya	Mohini	Colors TV
2015–2017	Mere Angne Mein	Sarla Ashok Agarwal	Star Plus
2017	Yeh Moh Moh Ke Dhaagey	Rami Raj Katara	Sony Entertainment Television
2017–2018	Laado 2	Malhari	Colors TV
2018	Woh Apna Sa	Sudha	Zee TV
2018	Krishna Chali London	Parvati	Star Plus
2018–2019	Beechwale – Bapu Dekh Raha Hai	Chanchal Bhatia	Sony SAB
2020–2021	Lockdown Ki Love Story	Sheetal Jaiswal	Star Plus
2021	Lakshmi Ghar Aayi	Jwala Mangilal Kumar	Star Bharat
2022	Gud Se Meetha Ishq	Nutan Rajat Khurana	Star Bharat
2023	Maitree	Sona Madan Tiwari	Zee TV
2023–2024	Pandya Store	Amba Arvind Makwana	Star Plus
2026	Tees Ke Paar Jab Mila Pyaar	Surekha "Akkasaheb" Sarpotdhar	Dangal TV

=== Web series ===
Year	Title	Role	Network
2020	Bebaakee	Benazir Abdullah	ALTBalaji
