= Dil Chahta Hai (soundtrack) =

Soundtrack album by Shankar–Ehsaan–Loy
- Released: 22 June 2001
- Genre: Film soundtrack
- Length: 38:57
- Label: T-Series

Shankar–Ehsaan–Loy chronology
Mission Kashmir (2000)	Dil Chahta Hai (2001)	Aalavandhan (2001)

Singles from Dil Chahta Hai
- 1. "Woh Ladki Hai Kahan" Released: 13 July 2001

Dil Chahta Hai is the soundtrack album to the 2001 Hindi film Dil Chahta Hai, directed by Farhan Akhtar, starring Aamir Khan, Saif Ali Khan and Akshaye Khanna. Since its release, the music has received widespread critical acclaim and is considered a milestone in the history of Bollywood film music. It was featured in the BBC Asian Network's Top 40 Soundtracks of All Time list and PlanetBollywood.com's 100 Greatest Bollywood Soundtracks list.

== Background ==
Initially, director Farhan Akhtar had approached A. R. Rahman for composing the music. But since Rahman was busy with other engagements, he did not accept the offer. Later Rahman commented that he was glad that the project went to Shankar–Ehsaan–Loy and he personally loved their work in the film.

== Development ==
The album has a universal sound, unlike other Bollywood soundtracks of the time. The trio had various influences, including Irish and ethno. Shankar–Ehsaan–Loy along with Farhan Akhtar, Javed Akhtar and Ritesh Sidhwani went to Khandala to finalize the songs, which took a mere three and a half days. When they came back, they booked a studio and completed the recording in three weeks. They also used the Australian instrument Didgeridoo, a wind instrument developed by Indigenous Australians of northern Australia at least 1,500 years ago for the song "Jaane Kyon". They've also used various other traditional instruments like Dholak, Kanjira, Tabla and Flute.

== Track list ==
All the 3 lead actors and actresses, Aamir Khan, Saif Ali Khan, and Akshaye Khanna had different playback singing voices of their own. Udit Narayan, Sonu Nigam, and Shankar Mahadevan playbacked for Aamir Khan, Shaan playbacked for Saif Ali Khan, KK and Srinivas playbacked for Akshaye Khanna, Alka Yagnik sang for Preity Zinta, and Kavita Krishnamurthy sang for Sonali Kulkarni.

All lyrics are written by Javed Akhtar; all music is composed by Shankar–Ehsaan–Loy.

No.	Title	Artist(s)	Length
1.	"Dil Chahta Hai"	Shankar Mahadevan	5:11
2.	"Jane Kyun Log Pyar Karte Hain"	Udit Narayan, Alka Yagnik, Caralisa Monteiro	4:49
3.	"Woh Ladki Hai Kahan"	Shaan, Kavita Krishnamurthy	5:06
4.	"Kaisi Hai Ye Rut"	Srinivas	5:29
5.	"Koi Kahe Kehta Rahe"	Shankar Mahadevan, Shaan, KK	5:46
6.	"Akash's Love Theme"	Mike Harvey	2:10
7.	"Tanhayee"	Sonu Nigam	6:10
8.	"Dil Chahta Hai (Reprise)"	Shankar Mahadevan, Clinton Cerejo	4:18
9.	"Rocking Goa"	Chorus	2:06

== Awards ==
Year	Nominated work	Category	Award	Result	Notes	Ref.
2001	Udit Narayan for "Jaane Kyon"	Best Male Playback Singer	National Film Awards	Won		
2002	Shankar–Ehsaan–Loy	RD Burman Award for New Music Talent	Filmfare Awards	Won		
2002	Shankar–Ehsaan–Loy	Best Music Director	Filmfare Awards	Nominated		
2002	Shaan for "Koi Kahe Kehta Rahe"	Best Male Playback Singer	Filmfare Awards	Nominated		
2002	Alka Yagnik for "Jaane Kyon"	Best Female Playback Singer	Filmfare Awards	Nominated		
2002	Shankar–Ehsaan–Loy	Screen Award for Best Music Director	Screen Awards	Won		
2002	Javed Akhtar	Screen Award for Best Lyricist	Screen Awards	Won		
2002	Shankar Mahadevan for "Dil Chahta Hai"	Best Playback Singer Male	Bollywood Movie Awards	Won		
2002	Javed Akhtar	Best Lyricist	Zee Cine Awards	Nominated		
2002	Shankar–Ehsaan–Loy	Best Music Director	Zee Cine Awards	Nominated		
2002	Shankar Mahadevan for "Dil Chahta Hai"	Best Playback Singer – Male	Zee Cine Awards	Nominated		
2002	Sonu Nigam for "Tanhayee"	Best Playback Singer – Male	Zee Cine Awards	Nominated		

== Reception and legacy ==
Dil Chahta Hai is considered to be groundbreaking and one of the best soundtracks to have emerged in contemporary Indian music. The soundtrack stayed away from traditional Bollywood sounds and instead set a new standard for edgy, rock-influenced sounds. The way Shankar-Ehsaan-Loy used thickly layered orchestration and conveyed meaning through Timbre, Pitch and Melody rather than text, was then, probably new to Bollywood. PlanetBollywood.com's 100 Greatest Bollywood Soundtracks Ever read, "What made Dil Chahta Hai album special at that time was that it was an experimental album and it worked a huge way." According to the Indian trade website Box Office India, with around 20,00,000 units sold, this film's soundtrack album was the year's eighth highest-selling.
