= Woh Ladki Hai Kahan =

"Woh Ladki Hai Kahaan"

Song by Shankar–Ehsaan–Loy featuring Shaan & Kavita Krishnamurthy

from the album Dil Chahta Hai
- Language: Hindi
- Released: 13 July 2001
- Recorded: 2001
- Genre: Celtic fusion Filmi
- Length: 5:06
- Label: T-Series
- Composer: Shankar–Ehsaan–Loy
- Lyricist: Javed Akhtar
- Producers: Farhan Akhtar; Ritesh Sidhwani

"Woh Ladki Hai Kahaan" (transl. Where is That Girl?) is a 2001 song from the film Dil Chahta Hai, composed by Shankar–Ehsaan–Loy, performed by Shaan and Kavita Krishnamurthy and written by Javed Akhtar. The song stars Saif Ali Khan and Sonali Kulkarni. The song is about Sameer (played by Saif Ali Khan), who is captivated by a girl and finds himself constantly thinking about her. The lyrics of the song express his admiration and the thrill of wanting to get to know her better. It conveys his curiosity and excitement as he tries to figure out who she is and where she might be.

== Music ==
The track is frenzied Celtic music with bluegrass fiddling accustomed by Ehsaan's acoustic guitar riffs and flute. The song essentially launched singer Shaan's career, as it was the first hit of his career.

== Music video ==
The music video is known for its comical picturization, where choreographer Farah Khan pays tribute to Bollywood. The song spoofs the 60s, 70s and 80s of Hindi Cinema. The video features Sameer played by Saif Ali Khan and Sonali Kulkarni who plays Pooja, going into a theater playing a musical, who see themselves on screen instead. The song pays homage to the 60s, 70s and 80s as it progresses.

== Awards ==
Year	Nominated work	Category	Award	Result	Notes	Ref.
2002	Farah Khan	Best Choreography	Filmfare Awards	Won		
2002	Farah Khan	Best Choreography	IIFA Awards	Won		

== See also ==
- Dil Chahta Hai (soundtrack)
- Shankar–Ehsaan–Loy
