= Maachis =

1996 film directed by Gulzar

- Poster
- Directed by: Gulzar
- Written by: Gulzar
- Produced by: R. V. Pandit
- Starring: Chandrachur Singh; Tabu; Om Puri; Jimmy Sheirgill
- Cinematography: Manmohan Singh
- Edited by: M. Ravi & Sadanand Shetty
- Music by: Vishal Bhardwaj
- Distributed by: Eros Entertainment
- Release date: 25 October 1996
- Running time: 168 minutes
- Country: India
- Language: Hindi
- Budget: ₹20 million
- Box office: est. ₹63.6 million

Maachis (transl. Matchsticks) is a 1996 Indian Hindi-language period political thriller film written and directed by Gulzar. The film stars Chandrachur Singh, Om Puri, Tabu, and Jimmy Sheirgill. The film is set against the backdrop of the Sikh insurgency in Punjab during the 1980s. The plot delves into the personal and political turmoil faced by individuals caught in violence and explores themes of state repression, vengeance, and the radicalization of youth.

The film was released on 25 October 1996. Maachis received critical acclaim for its direction, story, screenplay, dialogue, and music. The film emerged as a commercial success at the box-office, grossing ₹6.19 crore against a production budget of ₹2 crore.

At the 44th National Film Awards, Maachis won 2 awards – Best Popular Film Providing Wholesome Entertainment and Best Actress (Tabu). At the 42nd Filmfare Awards, the film received 10 nominations, including Best Film, Best Director (Gulzar), Best Actress (Tabu), and Best Supporting Actor (Puri), and won 4 awards, including Best Male Debut (Chandrachur) and R. D. Burman Award (Bhardwaj).

== Plot ==
The story is set during the mid-to-late 1980s in Punjab, India, a period marked by violent insurgency triggered by Operation Blue Star, the assassination of Prime Minister Indira Gandhi, and the subsequent 1984 Sikh Massacre. The narrative unfolds through a series of intense flashbacks.

Jaswant Singh Randhawa and his sister, Veerendar "Veeran," live peacefully with their elderly mother, Biji, in a rural village. Kripal Singh, Jaswant’s childhood friend and Veeran’s fiancé, lives nearby with his grandfather. Their tranquil existence is shattered when Assistant Commissioner of Police Khurana and Inspector Vohra arrive in search of Jimmy, who is accused of attempting to murder a member of the Indian Parliament, Kedar Nath.

When interrogated, Jaswant plays a prank by leading the police to his puppy, Jimmy. Infuriated by his defiance, Khurana and Vohra take Jaswant into custody. Kripal desperately searches for Jaswant, visiting several police stations but finding no trace of him. After 15 days, Jaswant returns home, severely beaten and scarred from brutal police torture, all for a harmless prank.

Kripal, outraged by the police brutality, seeks help through legal channels but finds no justice. Frustrated, he decides to track down his cousin Jeetay, who is connected to militant groups. Kripal’s search leads him to a highway restaurant (dhabha), where he encounters Sanatan, a militant who had planted a bomb on a bus. Kripal asks for Sanatan's help, and Sanatan reluctantly agrees, allowing Kripal to travel with him, a "Commander," and other militants in a truck loaded with bombs.

Once they arrive at the militant hideout, Kripal explains his situation. The Commander reveals that he killed Jeetay for being a police informant. Despite Kripal’s plea for assistance, the Commander rebukes him, stating that they are not professional killers and that if Kripal wants justice, he must take matters into his own hands by killing Khurana by himself.

Kripal gradually earns the trust and respect of the militant group. Sanatan explains that Kripal's fight is not about nationalism or religion, but about defending fundamental civil rights and resisting a corrupt system that victimizes the innocent and devalues ordinary citizens. It is revealed that Sanatan himself is a survivor of the communal violence during the Partition of India in 1947 and lost most of his family in the 1984 anti-Sikh riots. He asserts that the ruling class manipulates society by dividing it along religious lines for political gain.

Kripal trains with the group and plans the assassination of Khurana. After a year of preparation, he successfully kills Khurana in a crowded marketplace. Horrified by his actions, Kripal visits Jaswant and Veeran one last time before going into hiding, but both are appalled at what he has done. When Kripal returns to the hideout, he finds it deserted. After staying undercover for a while, he is contacted by a group member who signals that he should prepare for a move. The Commander escorts him to a new hiding place in Himachal Pradesh and informs him that the police have connected him to Khurana’s murder, tracing it back to the incident involving Jaswant.

As Kripal settles into life on the run, he realizes there is no returning to normalcy. He finds solace in the militant group, which is preparing for a new mission and awaiting the arrival of a missile specialist. Kripal briefly considers applying for a local job, but Sanatan warns him that he is now branded a high-profile terrorist by the media, a convenient target for police looking for promotions. One of the group members, Kuldip, narrowly escapes a police encounter while transporting explosives and is left shaken. Desperate to escape, he begs Sanatan for permission to return home, promising to emigrate to Canada. Reluctantly, Sanatan agrees. However, unbeknownst to the group, Kuldip is killed by a bomb hidden in his backpack as he heads home.

Kripal also learns that one of his comrades, Jaimal Singh, is the same Jimmy the police had been hunting all along. Soon after, the group's awaited missile specialist arrives, and to Kripal's shock, it is none other than his fiancée, Veerendar "Veeran" Kaur. The two finally speak privately, and Kripal is devastated to learn that after Khurana's assassination, Jaswant was taken in for questioning, brutally beaten, and ultimately driven to commit suicide while in jail. Their mother died shortly after hearing the news, leaving Veeran alone. Subjected to daily harassment by Inspector Vohra, Veeran decided to follow Kripal’s path and reunite with him in the militant cause. As they spend more time together, Kripal and Veeran begin to rekindle their relationship.

Veeran quickly becomes an integral part of the group, bringing a sense of normalcy and the simple pleasures of daily life to the otherwise hardened outlaws. She forms close friendships with the group members, particularly Sanatan and Wazir. The group's next mission is to assassinate MP Kedar Nath, who survived Jimmy's previous assassination attempt, during his visit to a local Sikh shrine. In the midst of their stay together, Kripal and Veeran decide to marry in secret. Unbeknownst to Kripal, Veeran quietly takes his cyanide pill, a last-resort measure carried by each member in case of capture.

While scouting the Sikh shrine for surveillance, Kripal unexpectedly spots Inspector Vohra, overseeing security for Kedar Nath's visit. Kripal tracks Vohra to his residence but is caught in the act of attempting to kill him and arrested. One of the group's members witnesses Kripal entering Vohra's residence. Based on the fact that Kripal did not take his cyanide pill, Sanatan becomes convinced that Kripal has betrayed them to the police. He accuses Veeran of helping Kripal and orders her to be placed under house arrest. On the day of the mission, Sanatan orders the group to proceed and instructs Wazir to kill Veeran. However, Veeran manages to escape and slain Wazir.

Meanwhile, Jaimal and Sanatan begin the mission. Jaimal is killed as he stops Kedar Nath's motorcade on a bridge, but Sanatan succeeds in firing the missile and blowing up Kedar Nath's car. Now, on the run, Sanathan is hunted not by the police but by Veeran herself. In a final confrontation deep in the woods, Veeran kills Sanatan.

Veeran, still unrecognized as part of the militant group, visits Kripal in prison. During a seemingly innocent embrace, she discreetly passes him the cyanide pill. The film concludes with Kripal lying peacefully dead in his prison cell, having taken the cyanide. At the same time, Veeran is shown sitting upright in the back of a moving pickup tractor, blood streaming from her nose, indicating that she has taken the cyanide pill, too.

== Cast ==
- Tabu as Virender Kaur a.k.a. Veeran
- Chandrachur Singh as Kripal Singh a.k.a. Pali
- Om Puri as Sanatan
- Kulbhushan Kharbanda as Commander
- Kanwaljit Singh as Inspector Vohra
- S M Zaheer as Khurana
- Raj Zutshi as Jaswant Singh Randhawa a.k.a. Jassi
- Banwari Taneja as Kripal Singh's Grandfather
- Jimmy Sheirgill as Jaimal Singh a.k.a. Jimmy
- Ravi Gossain as Kuldeep
- Suneel Sinha as Wazir Singh a.k.a. Wazira
- Amrik Gill as Nanoo
- Naseeruddin Shah as Cameo in open credits

== Release ==
Maachis was originally scheduled to be released on 18 October 1996, but its release was delayed by a week to 25 October 1996.

== Controversy ==
Maachis was banned in Malaysia by the censor board on grounds that "it may hurt religious sentiments."

== Accolades ==
| Award (Note: Awards, festivals and organizations are in alphabetical order.) | Date of ceremony (Note: Date is linked to the article about the awards held that year, wherever possible.) | Category | Recipient(s) | Result | Ref. |
|---|---|---|---|---|---|
| Filmfare Awards | 23 February 1997 | Best Film | Maachis | Nominated | |
| Filmfare Awards | 23 February 1997 | Best Director | Gulzar | Nominated | |
| Filmfare Awards | 23 February 1997 | Best Story | Gulzar | Won | |
| Filmfare Awards | 23 February 1997 | Best Dialogue | Gulzar | Won | |
| Filmfare Awards | 23 February 1997 | Best Actress | Tabu | Nominated | |
| Filmfare Awards | 23 February 1997 | Best Supporting Actor | Om Puri | Nominated | |
| Filmfare Awards | 23 February 1997 | Best Male Debut | Chandrachur Singh | Won | |
| Filmfare Awards | 23 February 1997 | Best Music Director | Vishal Bhardwaj | Nominated | |
| Filmfare Awards | 23 February 1997 | R. D. Burman Award | Vishal Bhardwaj | Won | |
| Filmfare Awards | 23 February 1997 | Best Lyricist | Gulzar (for "Chappa Chappa") | Nominated | |
| Filmfare Awards | 23 February 1997 | Best Male Playback Singer | Hariharan and Suresh Wadkar (for "Chappa Chappa") | Nominated | |
| National Film Awards | 15 July 1997 | Best Popular Film Providing Wholesome Entertainment | Producer: R. V. Pandit; Director: Gulzar | Won | |
| National Film Awards | 15 July 1997 | Best Actress | Tabu | Won | |
| Screen Awards | 1997 | Best Story | Gulzar | Won | |
| Screen Awards | 1997 | Best Dialogue | Gulzar | Won | |
| Screen Awards | 1997 | Best Male Debut | Chandrachur Singh | Won | |
| Screen Awards | 1997 | Best Sound Recording | Narinder Singh | Won | |

== Soundtrack ==
Maachis

Soundtrack album by Vishal Bhardwaj
- Released: 8 June 1996
- Genre: Feature film soundtrack
- Length: 43:55
- Label: PAN Music

Vishal Bhardwaj chronology
| Sanshodhan (1996) | Maachis (1996) | Tunnu Ki Tina (1997) |

The score and soundtrack for Maachis were composed by Vishal Bhardwaj, with lyrics written by Gulzar. The soundtrack album includes several background score pieces from the film, complementing its intense narrative and themes.

The song "Chhod Aaye Hum" marked the debut of singer KK as a playback singer in Hindi cinema.

All lyrics are written by Gulzar; all music is composed by Vishal Bhardwaj.

| No. | Title | Singer(s) | Length |
|---|---|---|---|
| 1. | "Chhod Aaye Hum" | Hariharan, Suresh Wadkar, Vinod Sehgal & KK | 05:15 |
| 2. | "Tum Gaye" | Lata Mangeshkar, Sanjeev Abhyankar | 04:54 |
| 3. | "Yaad Na Aaye" | Lata Mangeshkar | 06:29 |
| 4. | "Aey Hawaa" | Lata Mangeshkar | 06:29 |
| 5. | "Pani Pani Re" | Lata Mangeshkar | 05:09 |
| 6. | "Tum Gaye (Film Version)" | Hariharan | 04:55 |
| 7. | "Bhej Kahaar" | Lata Mangeshkar | 03:25 |
| 8. | "Chappa Chappa" | Hariharan, Suresh Wadkar | 04:27 |
| 9. | "Maachis Theme Opening" | Vishal Bhardwaj | 01:49 |
| 10. | "Maachis Theme Closing" | Vishal Bhardwaj | 02:57 |
| Total length: | | | 43:55 |
