= Tabu (actress) =

Indian actress (born 1971)

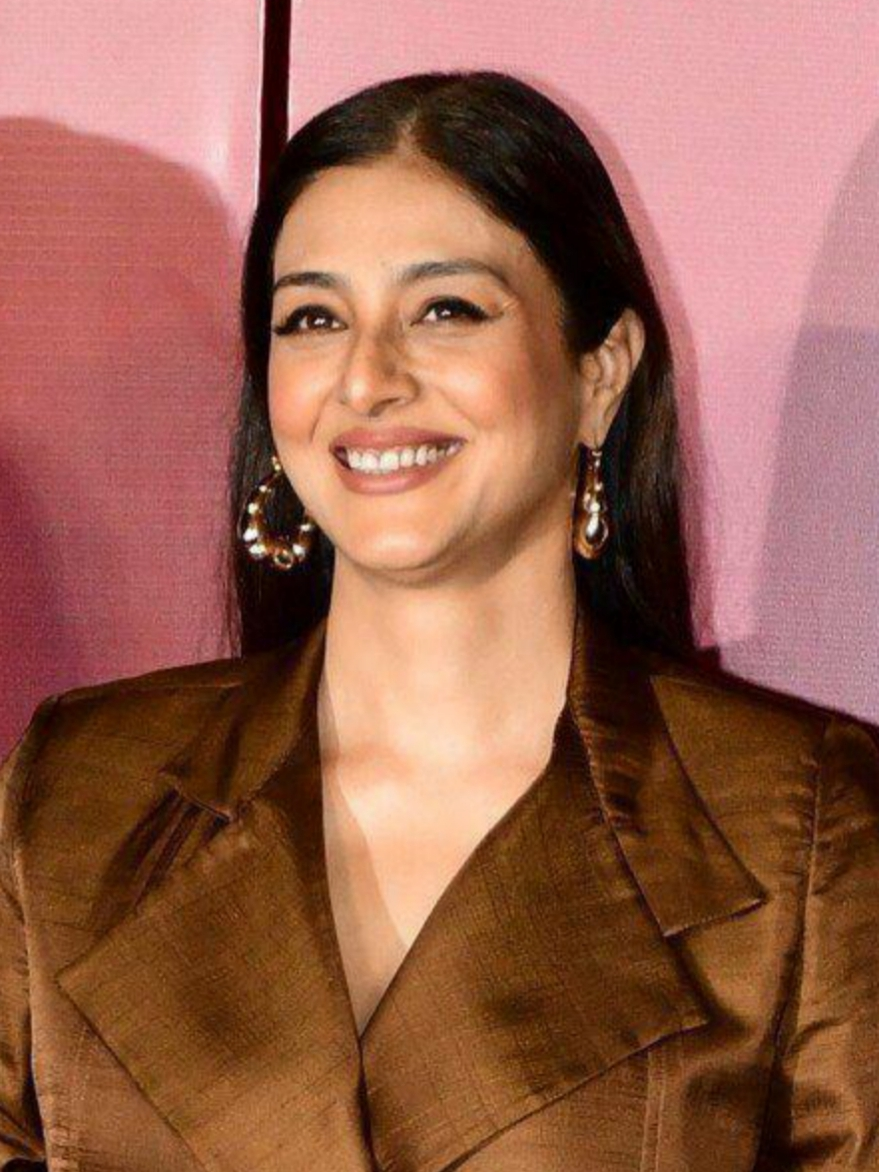
- Tabu in 2024
- Born: Tabassum Fatima Hashmi; 4 November 1971 (age 55); Hyderabad, Andhra Pradesh, India
- Occupation: Actress
- Years active: 1985–present
- Works: Full list
- Relatives: Akhtar–Azmi family
- Awards: Full list
- Honours: Padma Shri (2011)

Tabassum Fatima Hashmi (born 4 November 1971), professionally known as Tabu, is an Indian actress who primarily works in Hindi films. Widely regarded as one of Hindi cinema's most accomplished actresses, she is known for portraying complex, often troubled women, in both mainstream and independent films. She has received numerous accolades, including two National Film Awards, seven Filmfare Awards (including a record five Critics Awards for Best Actress), and two Filmfare Awards South. In 2011, she was honoured with the Padma Shri, India's fourth-highest civilian award.

Tabu made her first credited appearance as a teenager in Dev Anand's Hum Naujawan (1985) and had her first leading role in the Telugu film Coolie No. 1 (1991). In 1994, she won the Filmfare Award for Best Female Debut for her performance in the Hindi action drama Vijaypath. She received the National Film Award for Best Actress for portraying a young woman affected by the Punjab insurgency in the political thriller Maachis (1996). That same year, she enjoyed commercial success with Ninne Pelladata, Kadhal Desam, Saajan Chale Sasural, and Jeet. Further box-office hits included the dramas Iruvar and Border (both 1997), Biwi No.1 and Hum Saath-Saath Hain (both 1999), as well as Kandukondain Kandukondain and Hera Pheri (both 2000).

Tabu earned critical acclaim for her portrayals of complex women in the Malayalam film Kaalapani (1996), Virasat (1997), Hu Tu Tu (1999), and Astitva (2000), all of which won her Filmfare Critics' Awards; and as a bar dancer in Chandni Bar (2001), which earned her a second National Film Award. This acclaim continued with her performance of a woman in a relationship with an older man in the romantic comedy Cheeni Kum (2007), which garnered her a record fourth Filmfare Critics Award for Best Actress, and in the Vishal Bhardwaj-directed Shakespearean adaptations—Maqbool (2004) and Haider (2014), the latter earning her the Filmfare Award for Best Supporting Actress. Tabu expanded into American cinema with acclaimed dramas The Namesake (2006) and Life of Pi (2012), which were both box-office successes.

Her biggest commercial successes in India came later in her career, including the comedies Golmaal Again (2017), Bhool Bhulaiyaa 2 (2022), Crew (2024) and Bhooth Bangla (2026); the action drama Ala Vaikunthapurramuloo (2020); and the crime thrillers Andhadhun (2018), Drishyam 2 (2022) and its sequel Drishyam: The Conclusion (2026), the highest-grossing film of her career. For Bhool Bhulaiyaa 2, she won another Filmfare Award for Best Actress (Critics).

== Early and personal life ==
Tabassum Fatima Hashmi was born on 4 November 1971 to Jamal Ali Hashmi and Rizwana in a Hyderabadi Muslim family. Her father was an actor in Pakistan, with some well-received roles in the 1970s, who moved back to India in order to live with her mother. He left the family when she was three. She has an older sister, Farah, who is also an actress. Her mother was a school-teacher and her maternal grandparents were retired professors who ran a school. Her grandfather, Mohammed Ahsan, was a professor of mathematics, and her grandmother was a professor of English literature.

Tabu did her schooling at St. Ann's High School, Vijayanagar Colony, Hyderabad. She moved to Mumbai in 1983 and studied at St. Xavier's College for 2 years. She is the niece of Shabana Azmi, Tanvi Azmi and Baba Azmi. She has been reluctant to discuss her family life in the media. As a child, Tabu had an uncredited appearance at the age of 11 in Bazaar (1982), and at the age of 14, she appeared in Hum Naujawan (1985), in which she played Dev Anand's daughter. Tabu's personal life has been subject to substantial media speculation due to her decision to remain unmarried unlike most of her contemporaries and has remained reticent when asked about her choice. When asked about her decision, Tabu stated that she "was working and wanted to see the world on [her] own. If I'd given it all up, it'd have been a disservice to me and my abilities. An ideal relationship is when both individuals grow by being in each other's lives. Relationships are meant to liberate, not stifle".

== Career ==
=== Debut and breakthrough (1991–1999) ===
In 1987, producer Boney Kapoor launched two major films: Roop Ki Rani Choron Ka Raja and Prem, in which Tabu was signed opposite Sanjay Kapoor, Boney's younger brother. Tabu made her debut in Telugu cinema with Coolie No.1 (1991) co-starring Venkatesh. The film was a major box-office success.

Tabu's first release in Hindi as a leading lady was in the romantic drama Pehla Pehla Pyar (1994), which generally went unnoticed. However, a turning point in her career came with action film Vijaypath (1994) opposite Ajay Devgn, for which she received the Filmfare Award for Best Female Debut. The film marked the first of numerous collaborations with Devgn. In the following year, significant appearances for Tabu included her role in the box-office success Haqeeqat and the romantic drama film Saajan Ki Baahon Mein alongside Rishi Kapoor and Raveena Tandon.

In 1996, Tabu had eight releases, two of which—Saajan Chale Sasural and Jeet—emerged as commercial successes and ranked among the top five highest-grossing films of that year. For the latter, she received her first nomination for the Filmfare Award for Best Supporting Actress. She was also seen in Gulzar's critically acclaimed political thriller Maachis opposite Chandrachur Singh. Her role as a Punjabi woman caught in the rise of Sikh insurgency earned unanimous critical claim; she earned her first National Film Award for Best Actress for her performance, in addition to her first nomination for the Filmfare Award for Best Actress. Tabu considered the film a turning point in her career, as it helped her recognise her potential as an actress despite her initial hesitation in accepting the role due to its serious subject matter. She followed this with a role opposite Nagarjuna in Ninne Pelladutha (1996), the highest-grossing Telugu film at the time of its release. For her performance, she earned her first Filmfare award for Best Actress – Telugu. Anupama Chopra described her as "breathtakingly sensuous". This acclaim continued with the Malayalam period epic Kaalapani, directed by Priyadarshan. She also made her debut in Tamil cinema with the successful romantic-drama Kadhal Desam, directed by Kathir.

Tabu's first release of 1997 was the J. P. Dutta-helmed Border, an ensemble war drama that retells the real-life events surrounding the Battle of Longewala during the Indo-Pak War of 1971; she played the role of Surinder "Preeti" Kaur Chandpuri. Though her role in the film was brief, it went on to be the second highest-grossing Indian film of 1997. That year, she also starred in the critically acclaimed action-drama Virasat for which she earned her first nomination at Filmfare for Best Actress (Critics). She followed this with a role in Mani Ratnam's Tamil political drama Iruvar, which had an ensemble cast consisting of Mohanlal, Aishwarya Rai, Prakash Raj and Gautami. She also appeared in Chachi 420 (1998), a remake of Tamil film Avvai Shanmughi co-starring Kamal Haasan. In her final release of the year, she starred in Aavida Maa Aavide.

In 1999, Tabu was seen among two successful ensemble films—the comedy Biwi No.1 and the family drama Hum Saath-Saath Hain, which went on to become the second highest-grossing, and the highest-grossing films of the year respectively. She also received near-unanimous critical acclaim for her performance in the drama Hu Tu Tu, with Namrata Joshi of India Today describing her as "mesmerising and eloquent". She won her second Filmfare Best Actress (Critics) Award.

=== Career expansion (2000–2007) ===
In 2000, Tabu had five releases across several languages. She first starred in the comedy Hera Pheri and the drama Astitva in Hindi. The former was a box-office success, while the latter earned critical acclaim. Hindustan Times's Arnab Banerjee praised her performance in Astitva, writing that she "is brilliant and once again proves her mettle as an actress". She won her third Filmfare Award for Best Actress (Critics) for Astitva, along with her fourth nomination for Best Actress. In the South, Tabu had two Tamil releases and one Malayalam film. Her Tamil films included the romantic musical Kandukondain Kandukondain, an adaptation of Jane Austen's Sense and Sensibility, and the mystery thriller Snegithiye. In Kandukondain Kandukondain, she starred alongside Mammootty, Ajith Kumar, and Aishwarya Rai as Sowmya, based on the character of Elinor Dashwood—Rai's character's sagacious older sister. In Snegithiye, directed by Priyadarshan, Tabu portrayed a headstrong police officer investigating the murder of twin sisters. Both films were critically acclaimed and commercially successful. Tabu's Malayalam release, the action thriller Cover Story, featured her alongside Suresh Gopi and received positive reviews from critics.

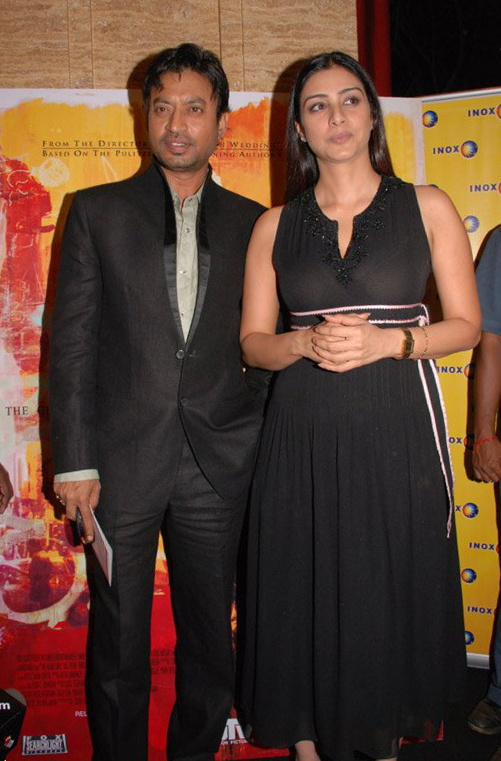
Tabu with co-actor Irrfan Khan at the premiere of The Namesake in 2006

In 2001, Tabu starred in Madhur Bhandarkar's Chandni Bar as a bar dancer. Despite her initial hesitation due to the failure of Bhandarkar's previous film Trishakti (1999), she accepted the role after hearing the film's narration. The film, along with Tabu's performance, received unanimous critical acclaim, and she received her second National Film Award for Best Actress and a fifth nomination for the Filmfare Award for Best Actress. Critic Taran Adarsh wrote, "Chandni Bar is Tabu's film all the way and there are no two opinions on that. Her performance deserves the highest marks and of course, all the awards. Her work is flawless and the impact her character makes on the minds of the viewer is also due to a tailor-made role". In a similar fashion, Salil Kumar of Rediff.com reviewed, "if there is one actress who can carry a film on her shoulders, it is Tabu. As usual, she sparkles!" Several publications have since regarded the performance as one of the finest of her career.

In 2003, Tabu starred in an adaptation of William Shakespeare's Macbeth, titled Maqbool, that saw Irrfan Khan in the eponymous role. Based on the character of Lady Macbeth, she played Nimmi, Khan's domineering lover. Helmed by Vishal Bhardwaj, the film was the first of his Shakespearean Trilogy and premiered at the 2003 Toronto International Film Festival. Maqbool was a box-office failure but was met with acclaim; Tabu's performance also received unanimous acclaim with critic Ron Ahluwalia writing: "Tabu shines in a dark role. The most versatile actress in Bollywood takes to villainy like second nature."

She played the supporting role of a RAW officer in Fanaa (2006), alongside Aamir Khan and Kajol. The film went on to become the sixth highest-grossing film of the year. The same year, she starred in her first Hollywood film The Namesake, directed by Mira Nair. The film was a success overseas, and she received positive reviews for her performance. In R Balki's romance Cheeni Kum (2007), Tabu played a 34-year-old tourist in London who falls in love with a chef in his sixties (played by Amitabh Bachchan). Due to budget constraints, Balki borrowed equipment from Nikkhil Advani's Salaam-e-Ishq for filming. Cheeni Kum received positive reviews from critics; Taran Adarsh praised Tabu for holding her own in the presence of Bachchan. Though the film was moderately successful in the domestic market, it performed particularly well in the UK and US. She acquired a record-setting fourth Filmfare Award for Best Actress (Critics) for her performance in the film.

=== Career fluctuations (2010–2017) ===
Following a three-year hiatus, which she attributed to being meticulous in her film selection, Tabu starred in Toh Baat Pakki! (2010), a romantic comedy about a woman searching for a husband for her sister (played by Yuvika Chaudhary). The film was widely panned by critics, including Raja Sen of Rediff.com who termed it a "bland, preposterously dated 'comedy'" that limited Tabu's performance. She next starred opposite Sunny Deol as a CBI officer investigating the murder of the Chief Minister of Maharashtra in the action drama Khuda Kasam. Both Toh Baat Pakki! and Khuda Kasam had minuscule box-office returns. She returned to Malayalam cinema in 2011 with a song appearance in the ensemble drama Urumi, directed by Santosh Sivan. Tabu had also completed filming for B. R. Chopra's Banda Yeh Bindaas Hai; however, the film was indefinitely shelved due to plagiarism disputes.

In 2012, she had a brief role in her second Hollywood film Life of Pi, playing the mother of Suraj Sharma's character. A.O. Scott of The New York Times described her limited screen time as "excellent". Tabu's sole release of 2013 was in Bejoy Nambiar's Hindi-Tamil bilingual crime thriller David co-starring Vikram and Neil Nitin Mukesh; the film failed at the box-office. Keen to take on a light-hearted role, Tabu returned to commercial cinema with the Salman Khan-starrer Jai Ho (2014), a remake of the Telugu film Stalin (2006). Despite being six years younger than Khan, she played the role of his elder sister. Variety's David Chute wrote that, "Stately-tall and with the profile of an Egyptian princess, Tabu is operating here several kilometers beneath her gifts". With earnings of over ₹1.9 billion (US$20 million), it emerged as the sixth-highest grossing Hindi film of the year.

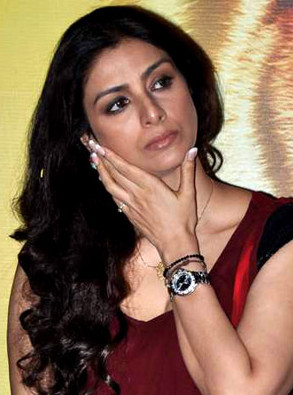
Tabu at a press conference for Life of Pi in 2012

She next reunited with Bhardwaj for Haider, his film adaptation of Shakespeare's Hamlet. The film completed Bhardwaj's Shakespearean Trilogy that previously featured Tabu in Maqbool. She initially passed on the role as she was hesitant about playing a mother to Shahid Kapoor, but relented when Bhardwaj stressed the character's importance to the plot. She essayed the role of Ghazala Meer, the Gertrude character, to Kapoor's Haider (Hamlet). Haider received critical acclaim, with Tabu's performance being particularly praised. Rachel Saltz of The New York Times and Lisa Tsering of The Hollywood Reporter both believed the actress had delivered the film's standout performance. She earned her first Filmfare Award for Best Supporting Actress.

Tabu continued to receive critical acclaim with her next venture, Drishyam (2015), in which she portrayed Meera, a police officer investigating the murder of her son. Directed by Nishikant Kamat, the film was a remake of the Malayalam film of the same name. Scroll.in's Nandini Ramnath wrote that Tabu's "raspy voice and impassive face convey the systemic obduracy that Meera Deshmukh represents". She earned her third nomination for the Filmfare Award for Best Supporting Actress. Both Haider and Drishyam emerged as commercial successes.

Fitoor—the Hindi adaptation of Charles Dickens' Great Expectations—was Tabu's sole release of 2016 alongside Katrina Kaif and Aditya Roy Kapur. Based on the character of Miss Havisham, she essayed the role of Begum Hazrat, Kaif's manipulative mother. Her performance divided critics; While Rachel Saltz remarked that her performance was inferior to her other roles in adapted English tragedies, she praised her ability to convey loss with "her great tragedienne's face", while Subhash K. Jha of Firstpost believed that she had been completely miscast in the role of Kaif's mother, but both criticised the inadequacy of the script. It emerged as a box-office bomb. The following year, Tabu joined Rohit Shetty's Golmaal film series in the sequel Golmaal Again. She cited her admiration for Shetty's work as the reason for her return to comedy. Her portrayal of a ghostbuster drew praise from The Indian Express' Shubhra Gupta who wrote that "her inclusion to the film is an unexpected pleasure". Golmaal Again became one of the highest-grossing Indian films of the year.

=== Resurgence (2018–2022) ===
Tabu's first release of 2018 was Mukul Abhyankar's Missing, a thriller film opposite Manoj Bajpayee. She lent her vocals for the film's only song, a lullaby titled "So Ja Re". Despite earning praise for her portrayal of a mother in search of her missing daughter, the film underperformed at the box office. She followed this with a special appearance in Rajkumar Hirani's biopic Sanju, starring Ranbir Kapoor. Tabu described her scene in the film as her "Truman Show moment", as she recreated the moment she presented Sanjay Dutt the award for Best Actor in a Comic Role at the 49th Filmfare Awards.

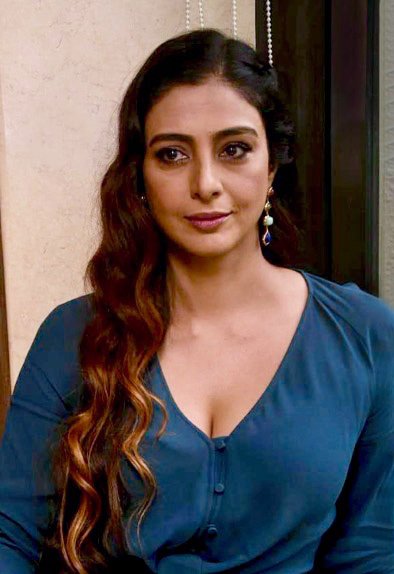
Tabu promoting Andhadhun in 2018

A turning point in her career came with Sriram Raghavan's crime thriller Andhadhun, which saw her as the parallel lead to Ayushmann Khurrana. The film, along with her performance, received unanimous critical acclaim. Critic Rajeev Masand lauded Tabu as "the film's towering performance" and reviewers for Reuters and Hindustan Times commended her capabilities as the femme fatale. With earnings of over ₹4.5 billion (equivalent to ₹4.8 billion or US$51 million in 2026), the film emerged as a top-grossing Indian film, and earned her a sixth nomination for the Filmfare Award for Best Actress, and fifth nomination for the Filmfare Award for Best Actress (Critics). In Akiv Ali's romantic comedy De De Pyaar De (2019), she starred as the ex-wife of Devgn's character who disapproves of his relationship with a younger woman (played by Rakul Preet Singh). She was drawn to exploring how a middle-aged divorcee navigates love. Rediff.com's Sukanya Verma praised the actress for enhancing an otherwise mediocre picture. She ended the year with a brief role as the missing younger sister of Salman Khan's character in Ali Abbas Zafar's partition drama Bharat.

The following year, Tabu returned to Telugu cinema after a decade in Trivikram Srinivas' Ala Vaikunthapurramuloo (2020), as the mother of Allu Arjun's character. It went on to become the second highest-grossing Indian film of the year and Tabu's performance received praised critically, earning her the Filmfare Award for Best Supporting Actress (Telugu). She followed this with both her television and streaming foray as Saeeda Begum, a ghazal singer who engages in a relationship with a younger man (played by Ishaan Khatter) in Nair's post-partition drama A Suitable Boy. Based on Vikram Seth's 1993 novel of the same name, the series marked the first BBC period-drama series to have a non-white cast. Critics were divided on the series, but Tabu's performance earned widespread praise. In a positive review for RogerEbert.com, Roxana Hadadi wrote that the actress "gives nuance to Saeeda's sense of otherness in a community that seems to both treasure and abhor her". She ended the year with a brief role (billed as a special appearance) in the unremarkable family comedy Jawaani Jaaneman.

In the spiritual sequel Bhool Bhulaiyaa 2 (2022), Tabu received critical praise for her dual role as twin sisters seeking vengeance against each other. She found the experience of playing the dual role particularly challenging as she had to showcase the characters in multiple time periods. Reception to the film was generally mixed, but Tabu's performance was considered a highlight; Monika Rawal Kukreja of the Hindustan Times observed that although Tabu delivered the film's standout performance, her depiction of Manjulika was less effective than Vidya Balan's in the predecessor. She earned a seventh nomination for the Filmfare Award for Best Actress, and a record-setting fifth Filmfare Award for Best Actress (Critics). Later that year, she reprised her role as Meera opposite Devgn in the thriller sequel Drishyam 2, directed by Abhishek Pathak. Archika Khurana of The Times of India regarded Tabu's performance as "simply outstanding", while Shomini Sen of WION remarked that she complemented Devgn with subtlety. Both Bhool Bhulaiyaa 2 and Drishyam 2 rank among the highest-grossing Hindi films of 2022, with the latter earning over ₹3.4 billion (US$36 million) worldwide.

=== Continued success (2023—present) ===
The following year witnessed Tabu portray a government official thrice in the thrillers Kuttey, Bholaa and Khufiya. In Kuttey, she essayed the role of a corrupt police officer—a role originally conceived for a man. Sukanya Verma commended Tabu for elevating a poorly-written script. Once again as a police officer, Tabu starred opposite Devgn in the action thriller Bholaa, which he also directed. In a mixed review of the film, Monika Rawal Kukreja felt that Tabu had not been given adequate scope to perform as she is "made to disappear as Devgn takes spotlight while fighting the bad guys". Both Kuttey and Bholaa underperformed at the box-office. In Khufiya, she reunited with Bhardwaj for their fifth collaboration as an operative of an intelligence agency. Released directly onto Netflix, the film had a generally ambivalent reception from critics. Anuj Kumar of The Hindu was appreciative of Tabu's consistent performances in Bhardwaj's projects, but felt that she had been overshadowed by co-actor Wamiqa Gabbi on this occasion.

Tabu returned to commercial cinema in 2024 alongside Kareena Kapoor Khan and Kriti Sanon in the female-led heist comedy Crew, in which the trio played flight attendants. In preparation, they received training from former cabin crew members. Outlook's Garima Das credited Tabu with the film's standout performance. Ranking among the top-grossing Hindi films of 2024, it emerged as a commercial success. She next reunited with Devgn for their tenth collaboration in Neeraj Pandey's Auron Mein Kahan Dum Tha, a romantic thriller about a married woman who rekindles a relationship with her incarcerated former lover. The film had meagre box-office returns against its estimated ₹1 billion (US$11 million) production budget. Lachmi Deb Roy of Firstpost panned the film's antiquated storyline and the underutilisation of both Devgn and Tabu.

In her final release of the year, she had a brief role as Francesca in the Dune franchise prequel series Dune: Prophecy, a character she described as "deep and intense". In a scathing review for The Hindustan Times, Abhimanyu Mathur wrote that making "an actor as natural and effortless as [Tabu] seem [artificial] is an indictment of how barren the show's writing is".

In 2026, she featured in a brief role in Priyadarshan's horror comedy Bhooth Bangla starring Akshay Kumar. It had a mixed reception from critics who felt that the actress had been underutilised in her role. Bhooth Bangla and Tabu's next release, Drishyam: The Conclusion, the final film in the Drishyam trilogy, are both among the top-grossing Hindi films of the year. In Drishyam: The Conclusion, she reunited with Abhishek Pathak and Devgn to reprise her role as Meera, although Rahul Desai of The Hollywood Reporter India noted that her character's significance remained largely confined to the first film. With worldwide box-office receipts of over ₹5.7 billion (US$61 million), it is the highest-earning film of Tabu's career. She will next feature in Puri Jagannadh's Telugu action film Slumdog: 33 Temple Road starring Vijay Sethupathi.

== Media image and artistry ==
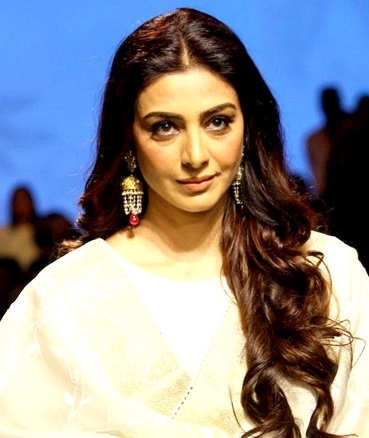
Tabu in 2017

Tabu is among the most accomplished actresses in Hindi cinema, known for her work in both mainstream and independent cinema. India Today observes that Tabu's "uncontrived freshness" and "mobile face" have made her a favourite in Bollywood, with her performances showcasing "a considerable range". Filmfare adds that her presence in a film's credits automatically raises audience expectations. According to Forbes, Tabu portrayed strong, women-oriented characters long before such roles were labelled "game-changers," while Vogue highlights her ability to deliver "non-stop stellar and heart-swooning performances." Eastern Eye describes her as a "versatile performer" often called upon to bring depth to commercial blockbusters. Film Companion has commented on the "aura of mystery" surrounding her as a celebrity, adding that her onscreen presence carries an "ineffable, intuitive quality." Despite having no formal acting background, Tabu considers herself a risk-taker, relying on instinct and her director's guidance rather than extensive preparation.

Members of the Indian film industry have often commented on Tabu's beauty and talent. Lyricist Gulzar hailed Tabu as "the beginning of a new era" and "a thinking actress in the mould of Nargis, Nutan and Meena Kumari". For filmmaker Karan Johar, Tabu is "truly the country's greatest actor", as well as "versatile", "adaptive" and "timeless". She describes her aunt, Shabana Azmi, as her "biggest critic". In 2023, journalist Rajeev Masand named her one of Hindi cinema's best actresses of all time. Known to be selective about her film roles, Tabu once said, "I do films which move me and most of all, the unit and the director should appeal to me". In 2019, at the 17th Indian Film Festival of Los Angeles she was honoured with "Opening Night Tribute". In 2019, Film Companion ranked Tabu's performance in Haider and Andhadhun among the 100 Greatest Performances of the Decade. India Today named her in their "Top Bollywood Actresses" list. She was placed in Filmfare's "Top Ten Actresses" of 2003. In Rediff.com's "Top Ten Actresses" list, she ranked 9th in 2007. She topped the list in 2014 and 2018. In 1998, Tabu received the Smita Patil Memorial Award for Best Actress, for her contribution to Indian cinema. Forbes India included Tabu in its "50 Showstoppers" list of 2022.

== 1998 Blackbuck poaching case ==
In 1998, Tabu was charged with poaching two blackbucks on the outskirts of Kankani village in Jodhpur district of Rajasthan during the filming of Hum Saath Saath Hain along with co-stars Salman Khan, Saif Ali Khan, Sonali Bendre and Neelam Kothari. A lower court charged her with the others under the Wildlife Protection Act, 1972 and the Indian Penal Code. She had filed a revision petition before a sessions court which discharged her of Section 51 (causing harm to wildlife) of Wildlife Act and Section 147 (punishment for rioting) and Section 149 (unlawful assembly of persons) of the Indian Penal Code. The Rajasthan State Government then filed a revision petition before the Rajasthan High Court at Jodhpur which again added Section 149 against her, which had been dropped earlier. In December 2012; the Jodhpur court summoned her along with all the accused for commencement of the trial with the revised charges on 4 February 2013. Although Tabu was acquitted in the blackbuck poaching case on 5 April 2018, the Rajasthan High Court issued her a notice, challenging her acquittal on 11 March 2019.

== Awards and nominations ==
Tabu received the National Film Award for Best Actress for Maachis and Chandni Bar. She received the Filmfare Award for Best Actress (Critics) for Virasat, Hu Tu Tu, Astitva, Cheeni Kum and Bhool Bhulaiyya 2, along with Filmfare Award for Best Supporting Actress for Haider, and the Filmfare Award for Best Female Debut for Vijaypath. She was awarded the Padma Shri, India's fourth highest civilian award, by the Government of India for her contributions towards the arts in 2011.
