= Vijaypath =

1994 Indian film by Farogh Siddique

- Directed by: Farouq Siddique
- Written by: Talat Rekhi (story)
- Produced by: Dhirajlal Shah
- Starring: Ajay Devgn; Tabu; Danny Denzongpa; Gulshan Grover; Reema Lagoo; Suresh Oberoi
- Cinematography: Alok Dasgupta
- Edited by: Suresh Chaturvedi
- Music by: Anu Malik
- Production company: Time Magnetic Pvt. Ltd.
- Release date: 5 August 1994
- Country: India
- Language: Hindi

Vijaypath (transl. Path of Victory) is a 1994 Indian Hindi-language action drama film starring Ajay Devgn, Tabu and Danny Denzongpa.

== Plot ==
Bhawani Singh (younger brother of Dilawar Singh), a career criminal and murderer, is arrested by Rajesh and sentenced to death by Justice Saxena. Dilawar Singh vows to kill Saxena.

Saxena, his wife and two children leave the city. Dilawar Singh finds them on a train, kills the judge's wife and throws Babloo out of the running train. Before dying, Babloo donates his eyes to Karan. Karan vows that he will not remove his goggles until he confronts Dilawar Singh.

A woman named Mohini, the daughter of a police commissioner, falls in love with Karan, who at first does not reciprocate her love but then he falls for her too.

== Cast ==
- Ajay Devgn as Karan/Karna in Mahabharata
- Tabu as Mohini/ Vrushali
- Danny Denzongpa as Dhritarashtra/ Dilawar Singh
- Suresh Oberoi as Inspector Krishna/ Rajesh Saxena
- Reema Lagoo as Kunti/ Mrs. Saxena
- Gulshan Grover as Shakuni/ Duryodhana/Shakti B. Singh
- Vikas Anand as Judge Mohanlal Saxena
- Ram Mohan as Police Commissioner Baburao
- Aparajita Bhushan as Mohini's mom
- Anant Jog as Bhawani Singh (younger brother of Dilawar Singh)
- Brijesh Tripathi as Driver Shankar (Karan's Father)
- Gurbachan Singh as Babban, Dilawar Henchmen
- Cheetah Yagnesh Shetty as Dilwar Henchmen
- Silk Smitha as item number "Kal Saiyan Ne Aisi Bowling Kari" (deleted)

== Production ==
The role of Mohini/Vrushali was originally offered to Divya Bharti. However, her sudden death led to her being replaced by Tabu.

== Soundtrack ==
Vijaypath

Studio album by Anu Malik
- Released: 29 July 1994
- Genre: Feature film soundtrack
- Length: 58:33
- Label: Tips Music

The soundtrack was very popular, especially the track "Raah Mein Unse Mulaqat" sung by Kumar Sanu and Alka Yagnik. According to the Indian trade website Box Office India, with around 3,000,000 units sold, the soundtrack became the seventh highest-grossing album of the year.

=== Track list ===
| # | Title | Singer(s) | Lyricist |
|---|---|---|---|
| 1 | "Raah Mein Unse Mulaqat" | Kumar Sanu & Alka Yagnik | Zameer Kazmi |
| 2 | "Ruk Ruk Ruk" | Alisha Chinai | Shyam Anuragi |
| 3 | "Sagar Sang Kinare Hai" | Kumar Sanu & Alka Yagnik | Shaily Shailendra |
| 4 | "Kal Saiyyan Ne Aisi Bowling" | Alisha Chinai | Anwar Sagar |
| 5 | "Aayiye Aapke Intezaar Tha" (Male) | Kumar Sanu | Faaiz Anwar |
| 6 | "Seene Mein Dil Hai" | Kumar Sanu & Sadhana Sargam | Zameer Kazmi |
| 7 | "Ladke Aaj Ke Ladke" | Anu Malik & Poornima | Indeewar |
| 8 | "Aayiye Aapke Intezaar Tha" (Female) | Sadhana Sargam | Faaiz Anwar |

== Awards ==
40th Filmfare Awards:

Won

- Best Female Debut – Tabu

Nominated

- Best Villain – Danny Denzongpa
- Best Female Playback Singer – Alisha Chinai for "Ruk Ruk Ruk"
- Best Female Playback Singer – Alka Yagnik for "Raah Mein"
