= Dil Chahta Hai =

2001 Indian film by Farhan Akhtar

- Theatrical release poster
- Directed by: Farhan Akhtar
- Written by: Farhan Akhtar
- Produced by: Ritesh Sidhwani
- Starring: Aamir Khan; Saif Ali Khan; Akshaye Khanna; Preity Zinta; Sonali Kulkarni; Dimple Kapadia
- Cinematography: Ravi K. Chandran
- Edited by: A. Sreekar Prasad
- Music by: Shankar–Ehsaan–Loy
- Production company: Excel Entertainment
- Distributed by: Yash Raj Films
- Release date: 10 August 2001
- Running time: 185 minutes
- Country: India
- Language: Hindi
- Budget: ₹80 million
- Box office: ₹397.2 million

Dil Chahta Hai (transl. The Heart Desires) is a 2001 Indian Hindi-language coming of age comedy drama film written and directed by Farhan Akhtar in his directorial debut, and produced by Ritesh Sidhwani under the newly formed Excel Entertainment banner. The film stars Aamir Khan, Saif Ali Khan, and Akshaye Khanna as three inseparable college friends navigating adulthood, relationships, and diverging life paths. It also features Preity Zinta, Sonali Kulkarni, and Dimple Kapadia in pivotal supporting roles. Set in contemporary urban India, the film explores themes of friendship, love, and self-discovery among upper-class youth.

Akhtar wrote the film based on personal diaries detailing his experiences travelling to different cities, with inputs on the story from creative associate Kassim Jagmagia. Shot on location in India and Australia, Dil Chahta Hai was one of the first Hindi films to use sync sound. Cinematography was handled by Ravi K. Chandran, with sound design by Nakul Kamte and H. Sridhar. The music was composed by the trio Shankar–Ehsaan–Loy, with lyrics by Javed Akhtar.

Released theatrically on 10 August 2001, Dil Chahta Hai received widespread critical acclaim for its modern sensibilities, direction, script, music, and performances, particularly those of Saif Ali Khan and Akshaye Khanna. Although it underperformed in rural regions, the film emerged as a commercial success in urban centres and grossed ₹397.2 million (US$4.7 million) worldwide, ranking as the fifth highest-grossing Hindi film of the year. It has since achieved cult status and is regarded as a landmark in Hindi cinema for redefining youth narratives and contemporary storytelling.

At the 49th National Film Awards, Dil Chahta Hai won two awards, including Best Feature Film in Hindi. It received thirteen nominations at the 47th Filmfare Awards, winning seven, including Best Film (Critics), Best Supporting Actor (Khanna) and Best Comedian (Saif Ali Khan). Over time, the film has been credited with launching a new wave of urban Indian cinema and establishing Akhtar as one of the leading filmmakers of his generation.

== Plot ==
Sameer is a hopeless romantic struggling with his domineering girlfriend, Priya. His friend Akash engineers their breakup and takes Sameer and another friend, Sid, on a road trip to Goa. There, they encounter Akash's 'two-week' ex-lover, Deepa, who initially refuses to let go. After Akash keeps her at bay, Deepa decides to move on following an encouraging conversation with Sid on the beach. Sameer stays behind in Goa, hoping to become intimate with his new Swiss-origin girlfriend, Christine. After Akash and Sid leave, Christine and a local accomplice rob him in his hotel room. Sameer returns to Mumbai in a truck and vows to avoid women, but his parents want him to meet Pooja, the daughter of a family friend, for a potential arranged marriage.

Sid helps his new neighbour, Tara, move into the house next door and becomes attracted to her despite their age difference. When he confides in Akash and Sameer, they tease him, with Akash suggesting that Sid is interested in Tara because of her sexual 'experience'. Sid slaps him, and the friends part ways. Akash soon leaves for Sydney at his parents' insistence to learn about the family's offshore business. Sid later leaves Mumbai after an argument with Tara ends badly.

Meanwhile, Sameer befriends Pooja, who is dating Subodh, a strict and inflexible disciplinarian. Sameer becomes increasingly irritated by Subodh and is pleased when Pooja ends their relationship. He and Pooja subsequently begin dating.

In Sydney, Akash develops feelings for Shalini, the fiancée of his college friend, Rohit. After sightseeing with Akash, Shalini returns to Rohit, leaving Akash despondent. Hoping to speak to Sameer, Akash mistakenly calls Sid's house. Feeling lost, he eventually returns home and proposes to Shalini. She abandons her wedding to Rohit, choosing to be with Akash.

Meanwhile, Tara develops liver cirrhosis as a result of alcohol dependence, forcing Sid to take her to hospital. He waits there and asks Sameer to keep him company. Akash arrives the following morning, reuniting the three friends. Tara soon dies in hospital, with only Sid at her side. Months later, Sid is in Goa, where he meets a woman at a picnic spot and approaches her with a smile. He is later seen having dinner with her, Akash, Sameer, and their respective partners.

== Cast ==
- Aamir Khan as Akash Malhotra
- Saif Ali Khan as Sameer Mulchandani
- Akshaye Khanna as Siddharth "Sid" Sinha
- Preity Zinta as Shalini
- Sonali Kulkarni as Pooja
- Dimple Kapadia as Tara Jaiswal
- Samantha Tremayne as Deepa
- Ayub Khan as Rohit
- Rajat Kapoor as Mahesh, Shalini's maternal uncle.
- Suchitra Pillai as Priya
- Suhasini Mulay as Nandini Sinha, Sid's mother.
- Bomi Doctor as A. R. Mulchandani, Sameer's father.
- Anjula Bedi as Mrs. Mulchandani, Sameer's mother.
- Yusuf Hussain as Naresh: Pooja's father.
- Ahmed Khan as A. K. Malhotra: Akash's father.
- Rajendranath Zutshi voices Ajay, Tara's ex-husband
- Asad Dadarkar as Subodh, Pooja's boyfriend
- Mandala Tayde as a girl who smiles at Sid in the climax
- Rakesh Pandey as Balwant, Rohit's father.

== Production ==
=== Development ===
Dil Chahta Hai originated from Farhan Akhtar's personal experiences and observations during his travels to Goa and a six-week stay in New York City in 1996. Initially conceptualized as a romantic narrative focusing on the characters Akash and Shalini, Akhtar found the story lacking in excitement and depth. Encouraged by his parents, Javed Akhtar and Honey Irani, who appreciated the concept but suggested enhancements, he expanded the narrative to include the dynamics among three friends, thereby shifting the focus to themes of friendship and personal growth.

While co-directing music videos for Shankar Mahadevan's album Breathless alongside his sister Zoya Akhtar in 1998, Farhan began scripting the film under the working title Hum Teen. The script, reflecting his own friendships and concerns, was initially penned in English and later translated into Hindi over two months. The project marked the cinematic debut of both Farhan Akhtar and producer Ritesh Sidhwani under their newly formed banner, Excel Entertainment. Kassim Jagmagia, a friend of Akhtar's, contributed to the story and joined the team as a creative associate.

=== Casting ===
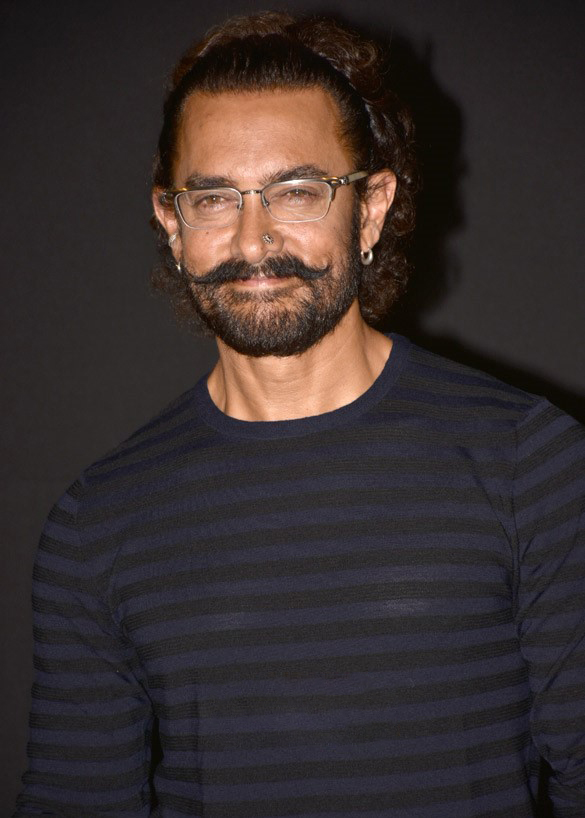
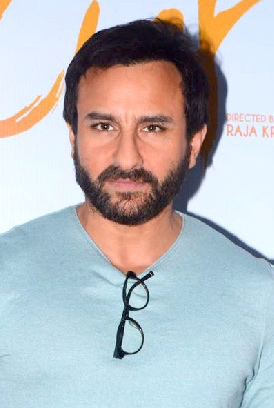
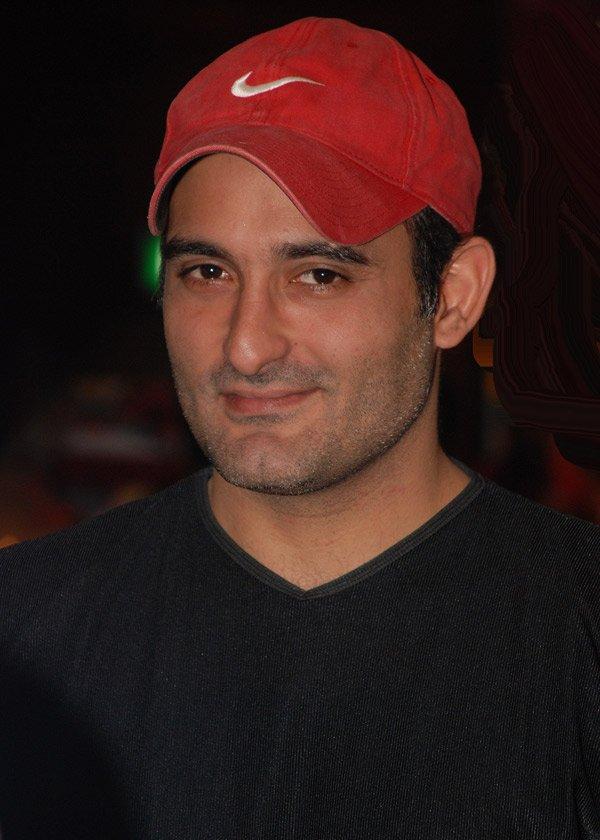
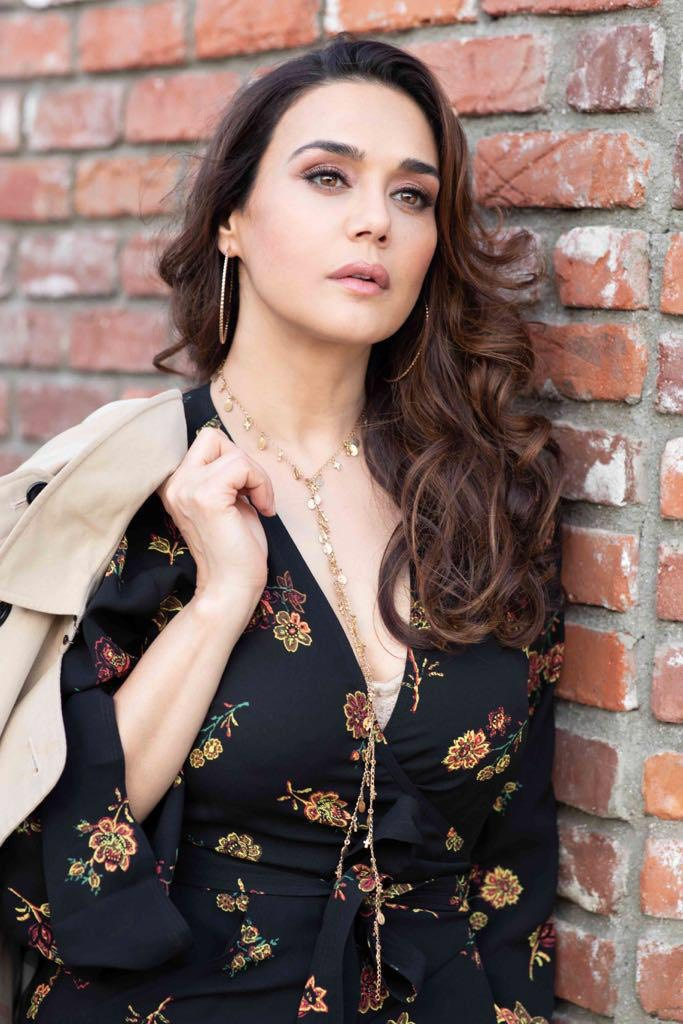
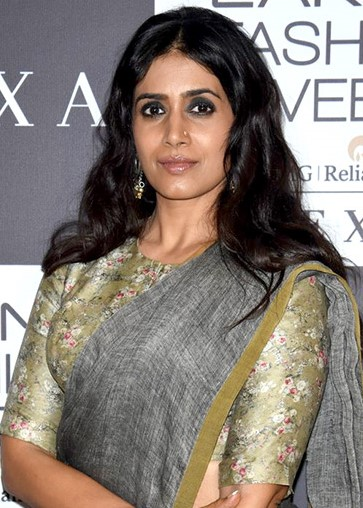
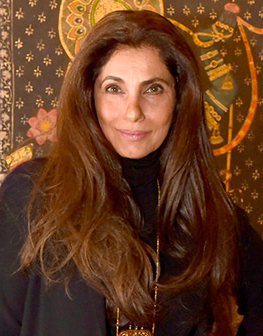
Clockwise from upper left: Aamir Khan, Saif Ali Khan, Akshaye Khanna, Dimple Kapadia, Sonali Kulkarni, and Preity Zinta were cast in the lead roles

The casting process underwent several iterations. Farhan Akhtar initially approached Akshaye Khanna for the role of Akash Malhotra. However, upon Aamir Khan's interest in portraying Akash instead of the more reserved Siddharth "Sid" Sinha, Khanna agreed to switch roles, taking on the character of Sid.

Saif Ali Khan was cast as Sameer Mulchandani, a role he found closely aligned with his own personality. Preity Zinta joined the cast as Shalini, Akash's love interest, after a screen test and preparation period of three and a half months. Sonali Kulkarni was selected to play Pooja, Sameer's eventual fiancée. Dimple Kapadia was cast as Tara Jaiswal, a middle-aged, alcoholic interior designer and divorcée, marking her first on-screen pairing with a significantly younger actor. Kapadia reportedly insisted that Farhan Akhtar address her by name rather than as "aunty" during the shoot.

Zoya Akhtar oversaw the casting process, ensuring a cohesive ensemble that could authentically portray the film's themes of friendship and personal evolution.

=== Filming ===
Principal photography for Dil Chahta Hai commenced in 2000 and spanned 108 days. The film was shot across various locations, including Mumbai, Goa, and Sydney, Australia. Notably, the scene featuring the trio at Chapora Fort in Goa became iconic, contributing to the fort's popularity as a tourist destination.

The film was produced on a budget of ₹80 million (approximately US$950,000). Ravi K. Chandran handled cinematography, capturing the film's contemporary aesthetic. The production utilized sync sound recording, a relatively novel technique in Indian cinema at the time, with Nakul Kamte and H. Sridhar overseeing the sound design. A. Sreekar Prasad served as the editor, and Suzanne Caplan Merwanji was the production designer. Arjun Bhasin managed costume design, while Farah Khan choreographed the film's musical sequences.

Hairstylist Adhuna Bhabani made her Bollywood debut with this film, and along with Avan Contractor, introduced distinctive hairstyles for the lead characters that became trendsetting among the youth.

== Soundtrack ==
The soundtrack and background score of Dil Chahta Hai were composed by Shankar–Ehsaan–Loy, after A. R. Rahman declined the offer due to date issues. The lyrics were penned by Javed Akhtar. The vocals were performed by Udit Narayan, Alka Yagnik, Caralisa Monteiro, Srinivas, Shaan, Kavita Krishnamurthy, Mahadevan, Clinton Cerejo, KK, Harvey, and Sonu Nigam. Noorani stated that the trio went to Khandala along with Farhan Akhtar, Javed Akhtar, and Sidhwani to compose six songs from a total of nine for the film in three-and-a-half days. Mendonsa described the experience as 35% of work and 65% fun and added that they had a "fantastic time". After staying in Khandala, Shankar–Ehsaan–Loy subsequently booked a studio to finish the recording in three weeks.

The soundtrack and background score for Dil Chahta Hai were composed by the musical trio Shankar–Ehsaan–Loy, marking their first collaboration with Farhan Akhtar. A. R. Rahman was initially approached for the project but declined due to scheduling conflicts. The lyrics were written by Javed Akhtar. Vocal performances on the album feature Udit Narayan, Alka Yagnik, Caralisa Monteiro, Srinivas, Shaan, Kavita Krishnamurthy, Shankar Mahadevan, Clinton Cerejo, KK, Harvey, and Sonu Nigam.

In preparation for the album, the composers, along with Farhan Akhtar, Javed Akhtar, and producer Ritesh Sidhwani, traveled to Lonavala, where six of the nine songs were composed over three and a half days. Ehsaan Noorani described the retreat as a balance of "35% work and 65% fun", while Loy Mendonsa noted that they later booked a recording studio to complete the album within three weeks.

== Release ==
Dil Chahta Hai was one of the most anticipated Hindi films of 2001, owing to its contemporary narrative centered on urban youth—an area seldom explored in Indian cinema. A one-minute theatrical trailer was launched alongside Aamir Khan’s Lagaan in cinemas and on television across India to generate early publicity and media interest. Ahead of its theatrical debut, a special screening was held for then-Indian Home Minister L. K. Advani at his residence in New Delhi.

The film was released theatrically on 10 August 2001, clashing with Yeh Raaste Hain Pyaar Ke, a romantic drama, which also starred Preity Zinta, alongside Ajay Devgn and Madhuri Dixit. Following its domestic release, Dil Chahta Hai was screened at multiple international film festivals, including the 33rd International Film Festival of India, the 14th Palm Springs International Film Festival, and the 11th Austin Film Festival.

The film premiered on Indian television via StarPlus on 17 August 2002. It was released on home media as a single-disc NTSC widescreen DVD on 14 December 2007, alongside a two-disc version distributed by Spark Entertainment. Since 18 November 2016, Dil Chahta Hai has been available for streaming on platforms including Amazon Prime Video and Netflix.

== Reception and legacy ==
=== Box office ===
Dil Chahta Hai had a moderate commercial performance upon release. While it performed well in metropolitan areas, it underperformed in rural regions—a shortfall attributed by trade analysts to its urban-centric storyline and characters. Nevertheless, the film enjoyed sustained success in urban centers, completing a golden jubilee run of over 50 weeks in some theatres. (Note: A golden jubilee film is one that completes a theatrical run of 50 weeks or 300 days.)

Released on approximately 210 screens across India, the film earned ₹9 million (US$110,000) on its opening day. It collected ₹27.7 million (US$330,000) over its opening weekend, and ₹57.3 million (US$680,000) by the end of its first week. The film ultimately grossed ₹332.8 million (US$3.9 million) domestically, ranking as the fifth highest-grossing Hindi film of the year.

Overseas, the film opened to strong box office numbers, collecting US$210,000 in North America and US$100,000 from Atlantic countries during its opening weekend. It went on to earn ₹16.5 million (US$200,000) in its initial overseas run, and grossed ₹64.4 million (US$760,000) by the end of its international theatrical engagement—making it the seventh-highest-grossing Hindi film overseas that year. According to Box Office India, the film earned an estimated ₹397.2 million (US$4.7 million) worldwide.

=== Critical reception ===
Dil Chahta Hai received widespread critical acclaim upon its release, with particular praise for its fresh narrative, direction, performances, and realistic portrayal of contemporary Indian youth. The film holds a 100% approval rating on Rotten Tomatoes, based on five reviews, with an average rating of 7.3/10.

Taran Adarsh of Bollywood Hungama described the film as a landmark in Aamir Khan's career and highlighted the performances of Saif Ali Khan and Akshaye Khanna. Sita Menon, writing for Rediff.com, commended Farhan Akhtar's directorial debut, noting his effective character development and Khanna's nuanced performance.

In Screen magazine, Piroj Wadia lauded Akhtar's script and direction, as well as Ravi K. Chandran's cinematography. Dinesh Raheja, also from Screen, appreciated the film's humor and Saif Ali Khan's comedic timing. Ziya Us Salam of The Hindu described the film as a rare depiction of male camaraderie and bachelor bonding, praising its situational comedy and natural character reactions.

Arati Koppar of Filmfare hailed the film as a "fabulous attempt" for a directorial debut, highlighting Aamir Khan's performance. Komal Nahta praised Preity Zinta's portrayal and noted Dimple Kapadia's suitability for her role, while critiquing Sonali Kulkarni's limited screen time.

Jasdeep Singh Pannu of NDTV labeled Dil Chahta Hai a "wonderfully-crafted film," though he noted a "melodramatic act, an element better kept to the conventional Bollywood movie." Zee Next named it one of the greatest Hindi films of the year. Saibal Chatterjee of The Hindustan Times wrote, "Farhan demonstrates a style that is as sophisticated as it is impressive. Virtually every character in the intricate tapestry that the young filmmaker creates is utterly tangible, the emotions are completely believable, and the situations fraught with subtle drama."

Internationally, K. N. Vijiyan of the New Straits Times observed that the film differed from typical Bollywood fare and might not appeal to all audiences, but acknowledged Chandran's cinematography. Beth Watkins, in a retrospective review for The Wall Street Journal, praised the film's blend of humor, emotion, and sincerity.

== See also ==
- List of accolades received by Dil Chahta Hai
