= Chandni Bar =

2001 film by Madhur Bhandarkar

- Theatrical release poster
- Directed by: Madhur Bhandarkar
- Screenplay by: Mohan Azaad
- Dialogues by: Mohan Azaad; Masud Mirza
- Story by: Madhur Bhandarkar
- Produced by: Lata Mohan
- Starring: Tabu; Atul Kulkarni; Ananya Khare; Rajpal Yadav; Upendra Limaye
- Cinematography: Rajeev Ravi
- Edited by: Hemal Kothari
- Music by: Raju Singh
- Production company: Shlok Films
- Release date: 28 September 2001
- Running time: 150 minutes
- Country: India
- Language: Hindi
- Budget: ₹15 million
- Box office: ₹66 million

Chandni Bar is a 2001 Indian Hindi-language crime drama film directed by Madhur Bhandarkar. It depicts the gritty life of the Mumbai underworld, including prostitution, dance bars and gun crime. The film stars Tabu and Atul Kulkarni in lead roles. Ananya Khare, Rajpal Yadav, Minakshi Sahani and Vishal Thakkar appear in supporting roles. The film received critical acclaim from critics, and was declared a box office hit. At the 49th National Film Awards, it won four awards: the National Film Award for Best Film on Other Social Issues, Best Actress (Tabu), Best Supporting Actor (Kulkarni) and Best Supporting Actress (Khare).

== Plot ==
Mumtaz is a naive young rural woman whose family is killed in communal riots. After her village is burnt to the ground, she moves to Mumbai with her uncle, the only family member she has left. They are desperately poor and her uncle persuades her to become a bar girl (dancer) at Chandni Bar and emotionally blackmails her when she refuses. He promises her that this is merely temporary, until he is able to get a job. Mumtaz is shy and loathes the work, but she forces herself to dance and flirt. However, her uncle doesn't keep his word; he lives on her earnings, drinking them away, and never gets a job. One night, after spending time drinking and watching the girls dance at the bar, Mumtaz's uncle rapes her. Mumtaz is distraught and emotionally confides in the other dancers. Even though they console her, Mumtaz is given a reality check when she realises that many other women at the bar have equally disturbing and painful stories. She manages to pull herself together and immerses herself in her work at the bar.

Eventually, Mumtaz catches the eye of a gangster called Pottya Sawant. He attempts to seduce her and finally resorts to paying her for sex. Mumtaz, however, cannot go through with the deed and tells Pottya about her rape. Enraged, Pottya kills her uncle and marries Mumtaz. Mumtaz leaves the bar, and Pottya rises up the criminal ranks quickly, despite his volatile temper. The couple live a happy life with their son, Abhay, and daughter, Payal. Mumtaz wishes for Abhay and Payal to be educated, and stay far away from her world of dancing girls and Pottya's world of gangsters.

Pottya's attitude and temper cause him to prematurely kill a police informant, which results in him losing friends and connections in the criminal world. He becomes a target for the police. He is captured and killed in an operation to 'eliminate' various Mumbai gangsters. A grieving Mumtaz slowly runs out of money and soon realises that Pottya has left behind a large amount of debt. With no source of income, she is forced to return to work at Chandni Bar.

Years pass, and Mumtaz still works at Chandni Bar, now as a waitress. She manages to provide a stable environment for Abhay and Payal, who are teenagers. Mumtaz encourages her children to do well in school, so that they can move away from their surroundings of crime and gangs. Abhay is very studious and performs well in classes, but soon befriends a group of troublemakers and delinquents. Despite being warned by Mumtaz, he continues to see his friends. One day, Abhay and his group are arrested by police for extortion and held in a juvenile prison. Even though he was not part of the crime, his reputation as Pottya's son causes the police to ignore his pleas of innocence. At the prison, Abhay is raped by a pair of older inmates.

Mumtaz attempts to talk to the police, to no avail. She meets with some influential people, who have police connections and can get Abhay released. They agree to help her but demand a high price, which she must bring to them in less than two days. Mumtaz has no choice and sells her body to obtain the money. She is still short. Seeing her mother's plight, Payal takes up dancing at Chandni Bar and brings the money to her troubled mother.

Having secured the money, Mumtaz is able to get Abhay released. However, she notices that he is not the same happy boy he was a few days earlier. Instead, he is cold, ruthless, and is looking for revenge. Abhay makes connections in the crime world and gets a gun, which he uses to kill the boys who raped him. Mumtaz arrives on the scene and is devastated to find that her son has become a killer.

It is implied that Payal is following in her mother's footsteps, and Abhay is set to be another Pottya.

== Cast ==
- Atul Kulkarni as Pottya Sawant
- Tabu as Mumtaz Sawant (née Ali Ansari)
- Ananya Khare as Deepa Pandey, bar girl.
- Rajpal Yadav as Iqbal Chamdi
- Shrivallabh Vyas as Habib Bhai
- Vinay Apte as Inspector Gaikwad
- Upendra Limaye as Gokul, Deepa's husband
- Manoj Joshi as Chandrakant Bhau
- Rajanna as Uma Shankar Pande
- Minakshi Sahani as Payal Sawant, Pottya & Mumtaz's daughter.
- Vishal Thakkar as Abhay Sawant, Pottya & Mumtaz's son.
- Abhay Bhargava as Hegde Anna
- Suhas Palshikar as Irfan Mamu, Mumtaz's uncle.
- Shabbir Mir as Uncle Pinto

== Awards and nominations ==
Chandni Bar won four National Film Awards. Tabu received Best Actress nominations at the Filmfare Awards and Bollywood Awards. Atul Kulkarni received a Best Supporting Actor nomination at the Star Screen Awards. Madhur Bhandarkar was nominated for Best Director in several venues but did not win.

Award	Category	Recipient(s)	Result	Ref
Bollywood Movie Awards	Best Actress	Tabu	Nominated	
Bengal Film Journalists’ Association Awards	Best Actress (Hindi)	Tabu	Won	
Filmfare Awards	Best Actress	Tabu	Nominated	
International Indian Film Academy Awards	Best Film	Chandni Bar	Nominated	
International Indian Film Academy Awards	Best Director	Madhur Bhandarkar	Nominated	
International Indian Film Academy Awards	Best Performance In A Leading Role Female	Tabu	Won	
International Indian Film Academy Awards	Best Performance In A Negative Role	Suhas Palshikar	Nominated	
International Indian Film Academy Awards	Best Story	Madhur Bhandarkar	Nominated	
National Film Award	National Film Award for Best Film on Other Social Issues	Producer: Lata Mohan Iyer Director: Madhur Bhandarkar	Won	
National Film Award	Best Actress	Tabu	Won	
National Film Award	Best Supporting Actor	Atul Kulkarni	Won	
National Film Award	Best Supporting Actress	Ananya Khare	Won	
Screen Awards	Best Director	Madhur Bhandarkar	Nominated	
Screen Awards	Best Actress	Tabu	Nominated	
Screen Awards	Best Supporting Actor	Atul Kulkarni	Nominated	
Screen Awards	Best Supporting Actress	Ananya Khare	Nominated	
Screen Awards	Best Screenplay	Mohan Azaad	Nominated	
Screen Awards	Best Story	Madhur Bhandarkar	Won	
Zee Cine Awards	Best Film	Chandni Bar	Nominated	
Zee Cine Awards	Best Director	Madhur Bhandarkar	Nominated	
Zee Cine Awards	Best Actress	Tabu	Won	
Zee Cine Awards	Best Supporting Actress	Ananya Khare	Nominated	
Zee Cine Awards	Best Story	Madhur Bhandarkar	Nominated	
