= Frontal assault =

All-out full-force military attack

A frontal assault is a military tactic which involves a direct, full-force attack on the front line of an enemy force, rather than to the flanks or rear of the enemy. It allows for a quick and decisive victory, but at the cost of subjecting the attackers to the maximum defensive power of the enemy; this can make frontal assaults costly even if successful, and often disastrously costly if unsuccessful. It may be used as a last resort when time, terrain, limited command control, or low troop quality do not allow for any battlefield flexibility. The risks of a frontal assault can be mitigated by the use of heavy supporting fire, diversionary attacks, the use of cover (such as smokescreens or the darkness of night), or infiltration tactics.

== History ==
Frontal assaults were common in ancient warfare, where heavy infantry made up the core of armies such as the Greek phalanx and the Roman legion. These dense formations, many ranks deep, would utilize their weight in numbers to press forward and break enemy lines. In medieval warfare, heavy cavalry such as mounted knights relied on frontal assaults for easy victories against infantry levies.

These tactics waned as the defensive quality of infantry increased, especially with the introduction of firearms. Both heavy infantry and heavy cavalry were replaced with lighter, more maneuverable troops.

Yet even in Napoleonic warfare, a frontal assault by cavalry against a thin line could be effective when conditions were right, or even by infantry if the enemy was shaken or weakened by preceding attacks. But as firepower increased, as with the introduction of the rifle, successful frontal assaults against a prepared enemy became rare. They continued to be attempted, however, as alternative tactics that could achieve a decisive victory for the attacker were not developed.

During the American Civil War, it took some time for generals on both sides to understand that a frontal assault against an enemy who was well entrenched or otherwise held a strong defensive position was unlikely to succeed and was wasteful of manpower.

During World War I, advances in machine guns and artillery greatly increased defensive firepower, while trench warfare removed almost all options for battlefield maneuver. This resulted in repeated frontal assaults with horrific casualties. Only at the end of the war, with the introduction of tanks, infiltration tactics, and combined arms, were the beginnings of modern maneuver warfare found as a way to avoid the necessity of frontal assaults.

== Notable battles ==
- Battle of Bunker Hill – British Army soldiers were mowed down by American troops as they proceeded up the hill, and failed to force the colonists out. The Americans later retreated on their own initiative.
- Battle of Missionary Ridge – Union army storms Missionary Ridge after flank attacks are stalled.
- Battle of Pea Ridge – Union army routs Confederate forces in a frontal assault on the second day.
- Battle of Spotsylvania Court House – Union army captures the "Mule Shoe" salient.
- Brusilov Offensive – Russian army breaks Austro-Hungarian lines during the First World War, though infiltration tactics were used.
- Battle of Vimy Ridge – Operationally, a frontal assault, though new platoon-based tactics enabled tactical maneuver at the lowest levels.

=== Particularly unsuccessful frontal assaults ===
- Battle of Carillon – A classic example of tactical military incompetence.
- Battle of Gettysburg – Pickett's Charge aims at the Union center and is repulsed.
- Battle of Fredericksburg – Union army fails to take Marye's Heights.
- Battle of Franklin – Repeated Confederate charges are repulsed.
- Battle of Balaklava – The Charge of the Light Brigade.
- Battle of Cold Harbor – Union assaults repulsed by Confederate forces with heavy casualties.
- Battle of Longewala – Failure of Pakistan Army's 206 and 51 Brigades with 2000-3000 men and 40 tanks attack on 120 Indian soldiers of the A company Punjab Regiment defending the Longewala border post.

== See also ==
- List of established military terms
- List of military tactics
- Military science
- Rush (computer and video games)
