= Kuldip Singh Chandpuri =

Indian Army officer

Brigadier Kuldip Singh Chandpuri MVC, VSM
- Chandpuri as a Major
- Born: Kuldip Singh Chandpuri; 22 November 1940; Montgomery, Punjab Province, British India (now in Pakistan)
- Died: 17 November 2018 (aged 77); Mohali, Punjab, India
- Other name: K. S. Chandpuri
- Education: Indian Military Academy; Government College, Hoshiarpur
- Spouse: Surinder Kaur Chandpuri
- Military career
- Allegiance: India
- Branch: Indian Army
- Service years: 1963–1996
- Rank: Brigadier
- Service number: IC-18067
- Unit: 14 Punjab
- Commands: 23rd Battalion, Punjab Regiment; Punjab Regimental Centre (PRC)
- Conflicts: India–Pakistan war of 1965; India–Pakistan war of 1971; Battle of Longewala
- Awards: Maha Vir Chakra; Vishisht Seva Medal
- Other work: Councillor in Chandigarh (2006-2011)

Brigadier Kuldip Singh Chandpuri, MVC, VSM (22 November 1940 – 17 November 2018) was a decorated General Officer in the Indian Army. He is known for his bravery and leadership in the Battle of Longewala during the India–Pakistan war of 1971, for which he was awarded the Maha Vir Chakra, the second highest Indian military decoration, by the Indian government. The 1997 Hindi film Border was based on the battle, with his role played by Sunny Deol. He was a councillor in the Chandigarh Municipal Corporation from 2006 to 2011.

== Early life ==
Kuldip Singh Chandpuri was born on 22 November 1940 in a Sikh Gurjar family in Montgomery, Punjab, British India (now in Punjab, Pakistan). His family then moved to their native village, Chandpur Rurki, in Balachaur. He was an active member of the NCC and cleared the NCC examination when he graduated from the Government College, Hoshiarpur in 1962. Chandpuri was the third generation in his family who have served in the Indian Army as officers. Both his younger uncles were flying officers in the Indian Air Force. Chandpuri was the only child of his parents.

== Career ==
In 1963, Chandpuri was commissioned from the Officers Training Academy, Chennai into the 3rd battalion, Punjab Regiment (3rd Punjab), which is one of the oldest and one of the most highly decorated regiments of the Indian Army. He took part in the India–Pakistan war of 1965 in the western sector. After the war, he served in the United Nations Emergency Force (UNEF) in Gaza (Egypt) for a year. He also served twice as an instructor at the prestigious Infantry School in Mhow, Madhya Pradesh.

=== Battle of Longewala ===
Kuldip Singh Chandpuri was a Major in 23 Punjab when the Pakistan Army attacked the Longewala post in Rajasthan, India, early in the India–Pakistan war of 1971. Chandpuri with his company of 120 soldiers and a small contingent of BSF defended the post, in spite of considerable odds, against the 2000-3000 strong assault force of the Pakistani 51st Infantry Brigade, backed by the 22nd Armored Regiment. Chandpuri and his company held the Pakistanis at bay for a full night until the Indian Air Force arrived to provide air support in the morning.

Chandpuri inspired his men, moving from bunker to bunker, encouraging them to beat back the enemy until reinforcements arrived. Chandpuri and his men inflicted heavy casualties on the enemy and forced them to retreat, leaving behind twelve tanks. For his conspicuous gallantry and leadership, Chandpuri was awarded the Maha Vir Chakra (MVC) by the government of India.

Chandpuri retired from the army as a brigadier.

== Maha Vir Chakra Citation ==
The citation for Chandpuri's Maha Vir Chakra award reads as follows:

Gazette Notification: 18 Pres/72,12-2-72
Operation: 1971 Cactus Lily
Date of Award: 05 Dec 1971

Citation: Major Kuldip Singh Chandpuri was commanding a company of the Punjab Regiment occupying a defended locality in the Rajasthan Sector. On 5th December 1971, in the early hours of the morning the enemy launched a massive attack on this locality with infantry and tanks. Major Chandpuri exhibited dynamic leadership in holding his command intact and steadfast.

Showing exceptional courage and determination, he inspired his men moving from bunker to bunker, encouraging them in beating back the enemy till reinforcements arrived. In this heroic defence, he inflicted heavy casualties on the enemy and forced them to retreat leaving behind twelve tanks.

In this action, Major Kuldip Singh Chandpuri displayed conspicuous gallantry, inspiring leadership and exceptional devotion to duty in keeping with the highest traditions of the Indian Army.

== In popular culture ==
- Border, the 1997 Hindi film directed by J. P. Dutta, was an adaptation of the real-life battle, with Major Chandpuri being portrayed by Hindi film actor Sunny Deol.

== Death ==
On 17 November 2018, Chandpuri died at the Fortis Hospital, Mohali due to cancer, at the age of 77, five days before his 78th birthday. He was survived by three sons.

== Military awards and decorations ==

Maha Vir Chakra	Vishisht Seva Medal		Wound Medal
Samanya Seva Medal	Samar Seva Star	Paschimi Star	Raksha Medal
Sangram Medal	Sainya Seva Medal	High Altitude Service Medal	Videsh Seva Medal
25th Anniversary Independence Medal	20 Years Long Service Medal	9 Years Long Service Medal	UN Emergency Force Medal

== Dates of rank ==
Insignia	Rank	Component	Date of rank
	Second Lieutenant	Indian Army	30 June 1963 (emergency); 16 January 1968 (substantive, with seniority from 15 January 1964 but for pay from 30 June 1963)
	Lieutenant	Indian Army	30 June 1965 (emergency); 16 January 1968 (substantive, with seniority from 15 July 1966)
	Captain	Indian Army	15 July 1970
	Major	Indian Army	15 July 1971
	Lieutenant-Colonel	Indian Army	10 February 1984 (substantive)
	Colonel	Indian Army	23 February 1987
	Brigadier	Indian Army	1 December 1991
