= Land Borders Law of the People's Republic of China =

Standing Committee of the National People's Congress
- Citation: Land Borders Law of the PRC. (in Chinese)
- Enacted by: Standing Committee of the National People's Congress
- Enacted: 23 October 2021
- Commenced: 1 January 2022
- Status: In force

Land Borders Law of the People's Republic of China (Chinese: 中华人民共和国陆地国界法) is a law to provide for the strengthening of its borders. It was adopted on 23 October 2021 and officially in effect as of 1 January 2022. The law covers border infrastructure, development, civilian employment and military-civilian relations.

== See also ==
- India–China border infrastructure
