= Tanot Mata Temple =

Hindu temple in Jaisalmer, India

Tanot Mata Temple shree Aavad Mata Charan goddess
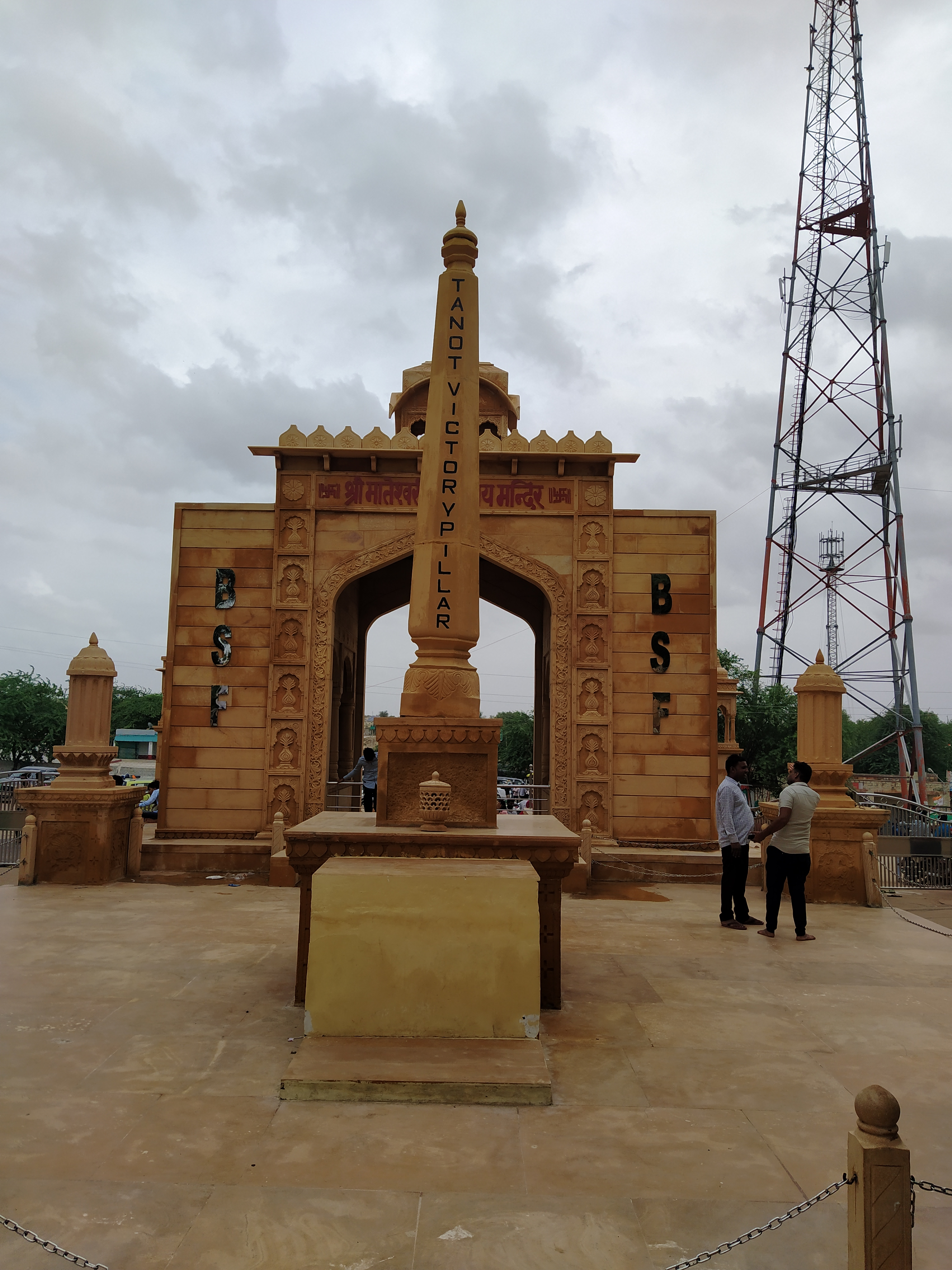
- Tanot Mata Temple (Front)

Religion
- Affiliation: Hinduism
- District: Jaisalmer district
- Deity: Tanot Mata

Location
- Location: Jaisalmer, India
- State: Rajasthan
- Country: India
- Interactive map of Tanot Mata Temple shree Aavad Mata Charan goddess
- Coordinates: 27.798388°N 70.354458°E

Architecture
- Founder: King Tanu Rao Bhati
- Established: 828 AD

Tanot Mata is a Hindu temple in Jaisalmer district, Rajasthan, India. The temple is located close to the border with Pakistan near where the Longewala battle took place during the Indo-Pakistani War of 1971. Contemporary folklore credits the temple for the victorious outcome of the battle.

Goddess Aavad, the daughter of Mamadji Charan (Gadhvi), is worshiped as Tanot Mata and was predecessor of Karni Mata. As many other Goddesses of the region such as Temde Rai, Karni Mata, Deg Rai and Khodiyar etc. she was also born in Charan caste and lived her life as warrior sage. As per the oldest Charan literature, Tanot Mata is an incarnation of divine Goddess Hinglaj Mata and thus is a Goddess of War.

== History ==
As per the traditional history scribes Charan records, the Hinglaj Mata reincarnated as the Tanot Mata and who later reincarnated as the Karni Mata.

A long time ago there was a man named Mamadji Charan, who had no 'son-daughter' i.e. no child. He traveled completely on foot to Hinglaj Mata about seven times to attain a child. One night, when the Hinglaj Mata asked Mamadiya Charan (Gadhvi) in her dream, whether you want a son or a daughter, Charan said that you should take birth at my house. By the grace of Hinglaj Mata, seven daughters and one son were born at that house. One of these was Aavad Mata, who is known as Tanot Mata.

The temple was constructed and the idol of the reigning deity was installed by the Bhati Rajput King Tanu Rao in 828 AD. Since then, the temple has been revered and worshipped by the Bhati Rajputs and the people of Jaisalmer for generations.

Tanot was attacked by the Pakistan Army during the Indo-Pakistani War of 1965 during which 3,000 bombs were fired towards the temple. However, the bombs either missed their target or did not explode. After the 1965 war, India's Border Security Force (BSF) took charge of the temple and the responsibility of managing and maintenance.

Tanot was attacked again during the Indo-Pakistani War of 1971, but this time the attacking tanks got bogged down in the sand, allowing the Indian Air Force to destroy them. After the 1971 war, the Indian Army built a Vijay Stambha (Victory tower) inside the temple compound to commemorate the victory in the Battle of Longewala. A company of 120 infantry only soldiers of Indian Army defeated a Division of 2000 Pakistani soldiers which also had the Pakistani tank squadron.

== Battlefield memorial ==
After India's victory in 1971 War against Pakistan, India's Border Security Force (BSF) expanded the temple, constructed victory tower and a war museum housing the unexploded Pakistani bombs and tanks. Every year 16 December is celebrated at the temple as the victory day.

Tanot temple and war memorial museum are now part of Bharat Ranbhoomi Darshan initiative of the Indian Military which will boost border tourism, patriotism, local infrastructure and economy while reversing civilian outward migration from these remote locations, it entails 77 battleground war memorials in border area including the Longewala War Memorial, Sadhewala War Memorial, Siachen base camp, Kargil, Galwan, Pangong Tso, Rezang La, Doklam, Bum La, Cho La, Kibithu, etc.

== Location ==
The temple is some 122 kilometres (76 miles) from the City of Jaisalmer, and it takes about two hours to reach by road. The area has a high average windspeed and as a result there are now a large number of wind-based renewable energy projects in the area. The road to Tanot is surrounded with miles and miles of sand üdunes and sand mountains. This is one of the hottest places in India and the temperatures in the area can rise up to 49 °C in the hottest days of the year. A temperature of up to 52.4 °C was recorded on 2 May 2016 in this area and if verified would be the highest temperature recorded in India. The official highest temperature recorded in India which is 51 °C was recorded in Phalodi also located in Rajasthan.

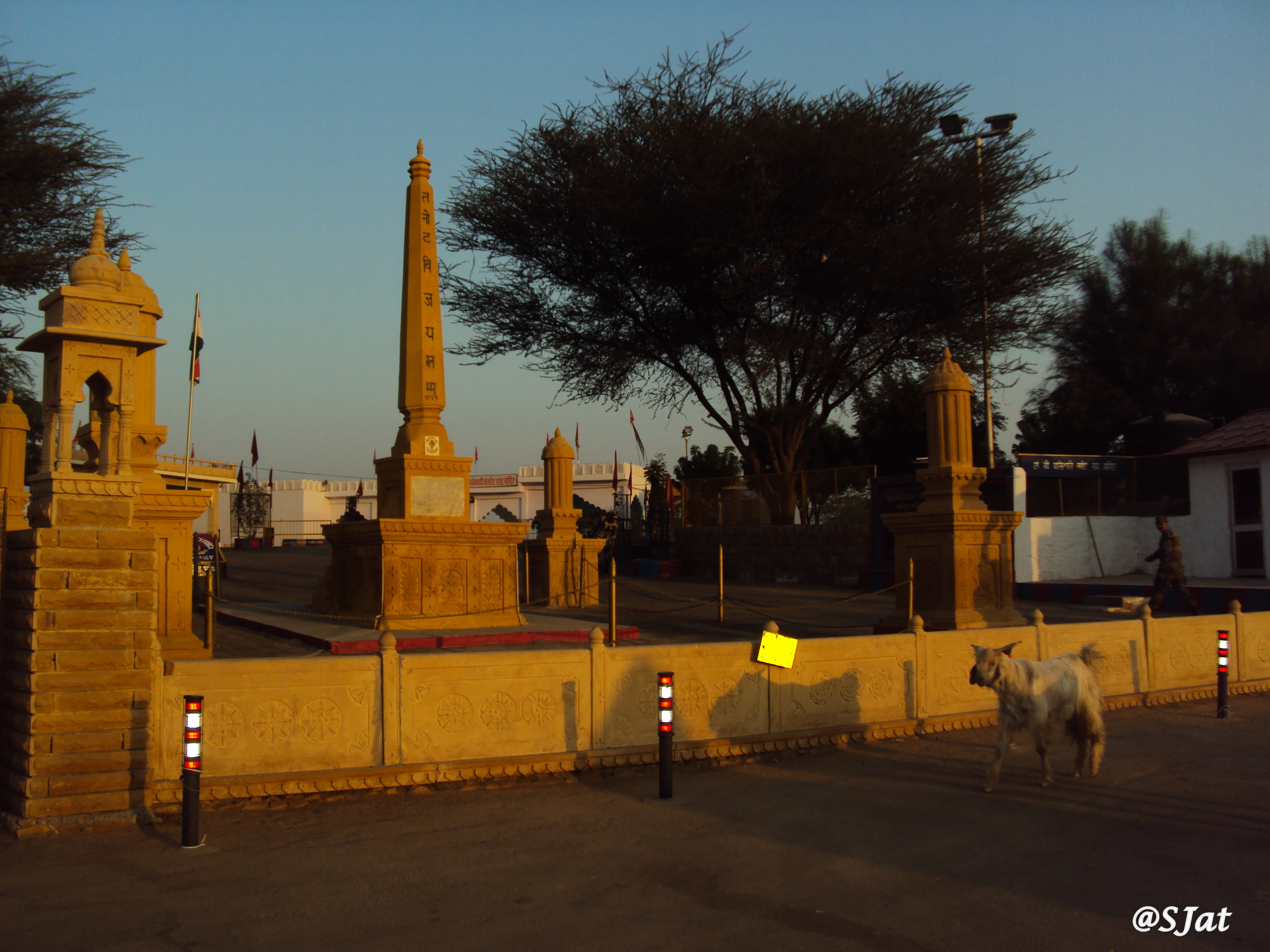
Tanot Mata temple

== In popular culture ==
- The shelling on Tanot Mata during 1971 Indo-Pak War was depicted in 1997 Bollywood war film Border.
- Hindi news channels like Zee News and Aaj Tak depicted Tanot Mata in their documentaries on the 1965 and 1971 Indo-Pak wars.

== See also ==
- India-Pakistan Border Ceremonies
- Hindumalkote
- Longewala
