= Battle of Longewala =

Major battle of the 1971 Indo-Pakistani War

- Part of India–Pakistan war of 1971
- Tank tracks at Longewala. Photographic reconnaissance image taken at the time showing the last-minute manoeuvres against Pakistani tanks in the Longewala sector. Circles show destroyed Pakistani tanks.
Date	4–7 December 1971 (3 days)
Location	Longewala, Rajasthan, India 27.524942°N 70.156693°E
Result	Indian victory

Belligerents
India	Pakistan

Commanders and leaders
(India) Major K. S. Chandpuri: (India) Wing Cdr. D. M. Conquest; (India) Major Atma Singh	(Pakistan) Maj Gen. B. M. Mustafa; (Pakistan) Brig. Tariq Mir; (Pakistan) Brig. Jahanzeb Abab; (Pakistan) Lt. Col. Akram Hussain; (Pakistan) Lt. Col. Zahir Alam Khan

Units involved
Indian Army: (India) 12th Infantry Division; (India) Alpha Company, 23rd Battalion, Punjab Regiment; 14th BSF Battalion (attached to 23rd Punjab) Indian Air Force; (India) 122 Squadron	Pakistan Army: (Pakistan) 18th Infantry Division; (Pakistan) 206 Brigade; (Pakistan) 51 Brigade; (Pakistan) 22 Cavalry (T-59); (Pakistan) 38 Cavalry (Sherman); (Pakistan) Field Rgt. (25 pdr); (Pakistan) 120 mm mortar battery; (Pakistan) 130 mm med. battery

Strength
1 Company (120 personnel) accompanied by half a platoon (6-7 border guards); 2 Medium machine guns 2 L16 81mm mortars 4 PIAT anti-tank rocket launchers 2 Jonga-borne 106mm M40 RCL gun 4 Hawker Hunters; 3 HAL Maruts; 10 Camels	2 Mobile infantry brigade (2,000–3,000 personnel); 40 tanks 1 field regiment 2 artillery batteries

Casualties and losses
2 KIA; 1 Jonga and M40 recoilless rifle destroyed; 5 camels killed	200–300 personnel killed; 36 tanks destroyed or abandoned; 100+ armored vehicles destroyed or abandoned
- Location within Rajasthan

The Battle of Longewala (4–7 December 1971) was one of the first major engagements in the western sector during the India–Pakistan war of 1971, fought between assaulting Pakistani forces and Indian defenders at the Indian border post of Longewala, in the Thar Desert of Rajasthan. The battle was fought between 120 Indian soldiers accompanied by four Hawker Hunter and three HAL Marut fighter-bombers and 2,000–3,000 Pakistani soldiers accompanied by 40 tanks. It is considered one of the greatest battles in the history of the Indian Army and a military victory against the odds.

A company of the Indian Army's 23rd Battalion, Punjab Regiment, commanded by Major Kuldip Singh Chandpuri, was left with the choice of either attempting to hold out until reinforced, or fleeing on foot from a Pakistani mechanized infantry force. Choosing the former, Chandpuri ensured that all his assets were correctly deployed and made the best use of his strong defensive position, as well as weaknesses created by errors in enemy tactics. He was also fortunate that an Indian Air Force forward air controller was able to secure and direct aircraft in support of the post's defence until reinforcements arrived six hours later.

The Pakistani commanders made several questionable decisions, including a failure of their strategic intelligence to foresee the availability of Indian fighter-bombers in the Longewala area, exercising operational mobility with little or no route reconnaissance, and conducting a tactical frontal assault with no engineer reconnaissance. This left the Pakistani brigade group extremely vulnerable. Their armored vehicles, attempting to deploy from a single track, bogged down in unsuitable terrain and were exposed to air attack. Their use of external fuel storage in tactical combat made them even more susceptible to enemy fire. Furthermore, the night attack over unfamiliar ground quickly fell apart. The infantry was surprised by unexpected obstacles, causing confusion which stalled the assault. This negated the concealment that otherwise would have protected them from Indian small arms and infantry support weapon fire.

== Background ==
The main thrust of the Indian Army during the 1971 war was directed towards the eastern theatre, with the western sector envisioned as a holding operation to prevent the Pakistan Army from achieving any success that would allow the President of Pakistan, Yahya Khan, any bargaining tool to trade against the captured territories in the east. By the last week of November 1971, the Indian Army had launched offensive manoeuvres at Atgram against Pakistani border posts and communications centres along the eastern border. The Mukti Bahini also launched an offensive against Jessore at this time. It was clear to Islamabad by this time that open conflict was inevitable, and that East Pakistan was indefensible in the long run. Yahya Khan chose at this point to try to protect Pakistan's integrity and to hold India by Ayub Khan's strategy—"The defence of East Pakistan lies in the West".

== Prelude ==
=== The Western sector ===
Khan's policy made the assumption that an open conflict with India would not last long due to international pressure, and that since East Pakistan was undefendable, the war effort should be concentrated on occupying as much Indian territory as possible as a bargaining tool at the negotiating table. The initial plans for the offensive called for at least temporary air dominance by the Pakistan Air Force (PAF) under which Khan's troops could conduct a lightning campaign deep into Western India before digging in and consolidating their positions. The PAF launched pre-emptive strikes on the evening of 3 December that led to the formal commencement of hostilities in the western theatre. The city of Rahim Yar Khan, close to the international border, formed a critical communication centre for Khan's forces and, situated on the Sindh–Punjab railway, remained a vulnerable link in Khan's logistics. The fall of Rahim Yar Khan to Indian forces would cut off the railway as well as road link between Sindh and West Punjab, starving Khan's forces of fuel and ammunition delivered to Karachi.

Indian battle plans called for a strike by the 12th Indian Division across the border towards Islamgarh through Sarkari Tala, subsequently advancing through Baghla to secure Rahim Yar Khan. This would destabilise the Pakistani defences in the Punjab and Jammu & Kashmir sector, allowing the planned Indian offensive in the Shakargarh sector to sweep the Pakistani forces trapped there.

Pakistan, which envisaged the Punjab as an operational centre, had a strong intelligence network in the area and planned to counter its own comparatively weak strength on the ground with a pre-emptive strike through Kishangarh towards the divisional headquarters south of Ramgarh. Longewala, which was originally a Border Security Force (BSF) post but was later taken over by a company of the Punjab Regiment prior to the war, formed a strategic point en route to capturing vast tracts of land and also a pivotal theatre of war in engaging India on the western front.

=== Tactical plan ===
Pakistan's tactical plan was based on the assumption that an attack in the area would help their 1st Armoured Division's task in the Sri Ganganagar area. Pakistan high command also felt that it was important to protect the north–south road link which they felt was vulnerable, as it was close to the border. A combined arms plan was decided upon. This involved two infantry brigades and two armoured regiments. A separate division, the 18th Division, was formed for this purpose. The 18th Division's operation orders required one infantry brigade (206th) with an armoured regiment (38th Cavalry) to capture and establish a firm base at Longewala, a junction on the Indian road system, and the 51st Infantry Brigade and the 22nd Cavalry (Pakistan Army Armoured Corps) to operate beyond Longewala to capture Jaisalmer.

The Pakistani plan was to reach Longewala, Ramgarh and Jaisalmer. The plan was far-fetched from the start, if only because it called for a night attack to be conducted over terrain that was not preceded by route or engineer reconnaissance, and the armoured troops were therefore unaware the ground could not support rapid movement towards the objective. As the day unfolded, Longewala would stand out as one of the biggest losses for Pakistan, despite overwhelming superiority before commencement of the battle, largely due to the vehicles becoming bogged down in soft sand.

=== Indian defensive planning ===
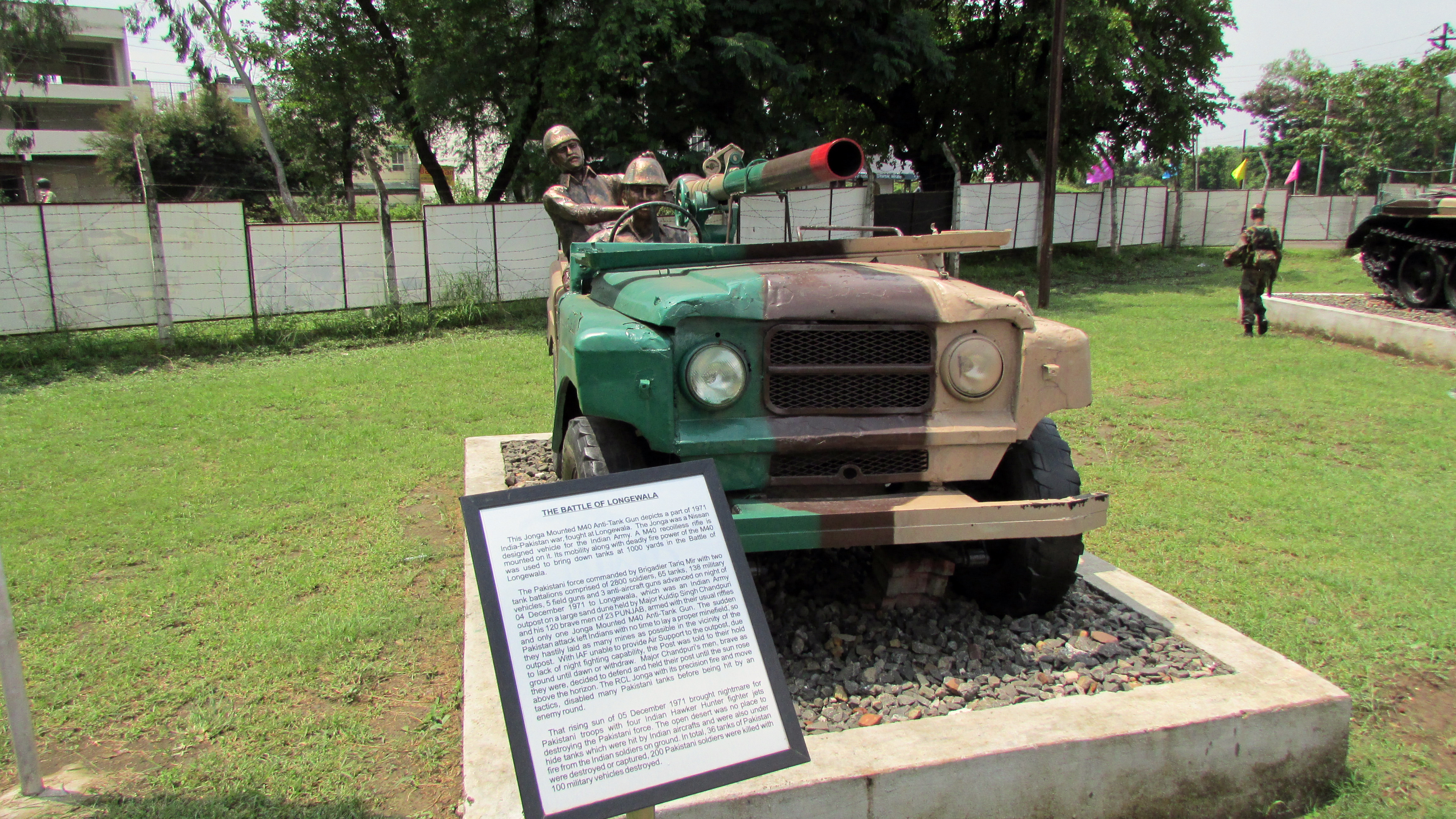
Jonga that destroyed several tanks during battle

On the Indian side, the post was held by A Company, 23rd Battalion, Punjab Regiment, led by Major Kuldip Singh Chandpuri, the defences occupying a high sand dune which dominated the area that was largely intractable to vehicles. The post was surrounded by a barbed wire fence of three strands. The rest of the battalion was located at Sadhewala, 17 kilometres (11 mi) to the north-east. Chandpuri commanded an infantry company reinforced by a section each of medium machine guns (MMGs) and L16 81mm mortars, and one Jonga-mounted M40 recoilless rifle (RCL). His two other recoilless rifle teams of the anti-tank section were under training at battalion headquarters. Chandpuri also had under his command a four-man team of the camel Border Security Force division.

The Longewala post had no armoured vehicles, but artillery support was available from a battery of the 170 Field Regiment, tasked with direct support of the battalion, and the 168 Field Regiment, which had been deployed to the area in secrecy just a day earlier. The direct support battery was attached to the 168 Field Regiment and served as its "Sierra" Battery. Immediately after PAF strikes on Indian airfields on 3 December, Chandpuri dispatched a 20-man-strong patrol under Second Lieutenant Dharam Veer to Boundary Pillar (BP) 638, on the border. This patrol was to play an important part in detecting the advances of Pakistani forces.

== Battle ==
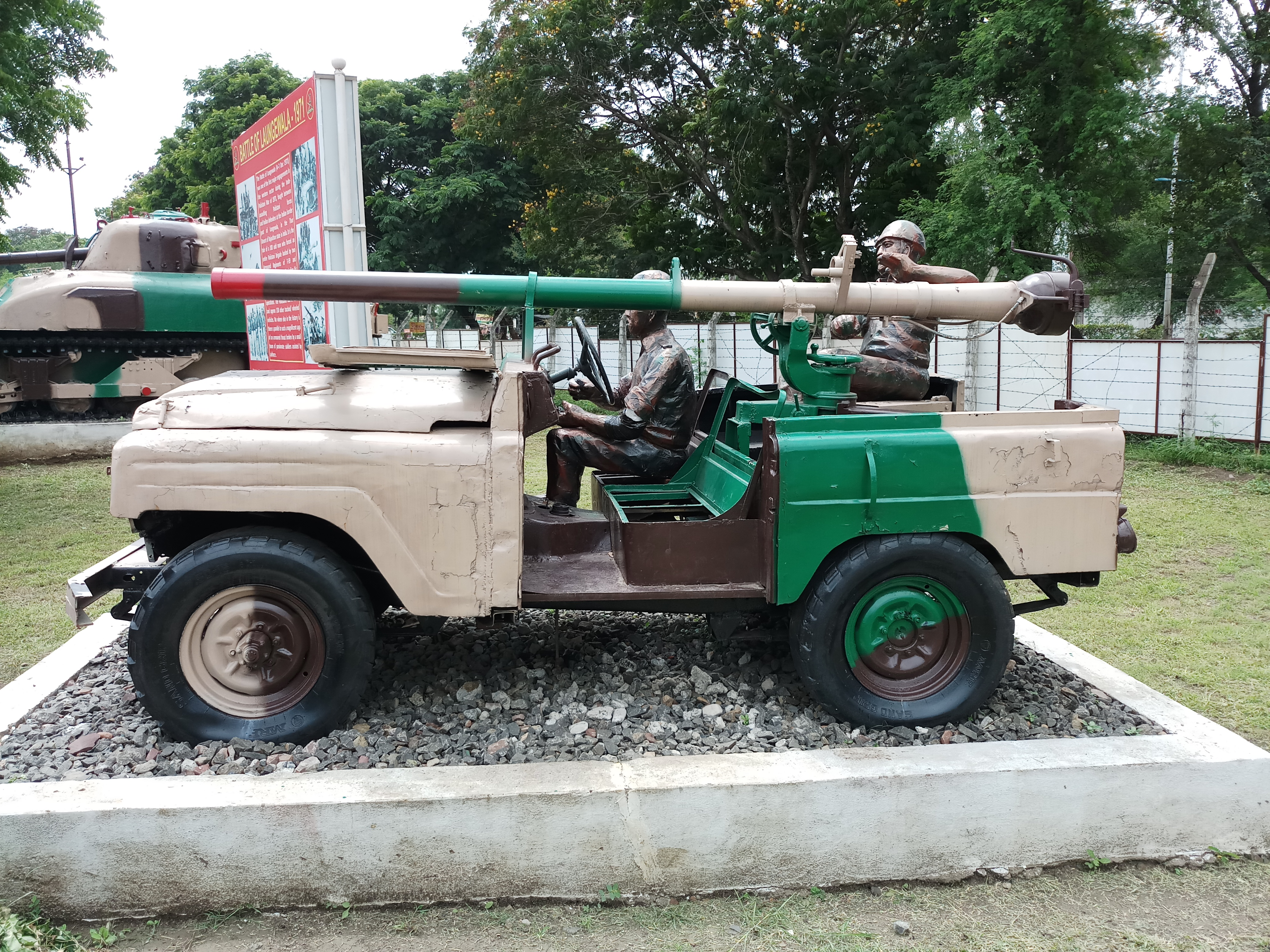
Jonga, mounted with 105 mm RCL gun, which destroyed several tanks

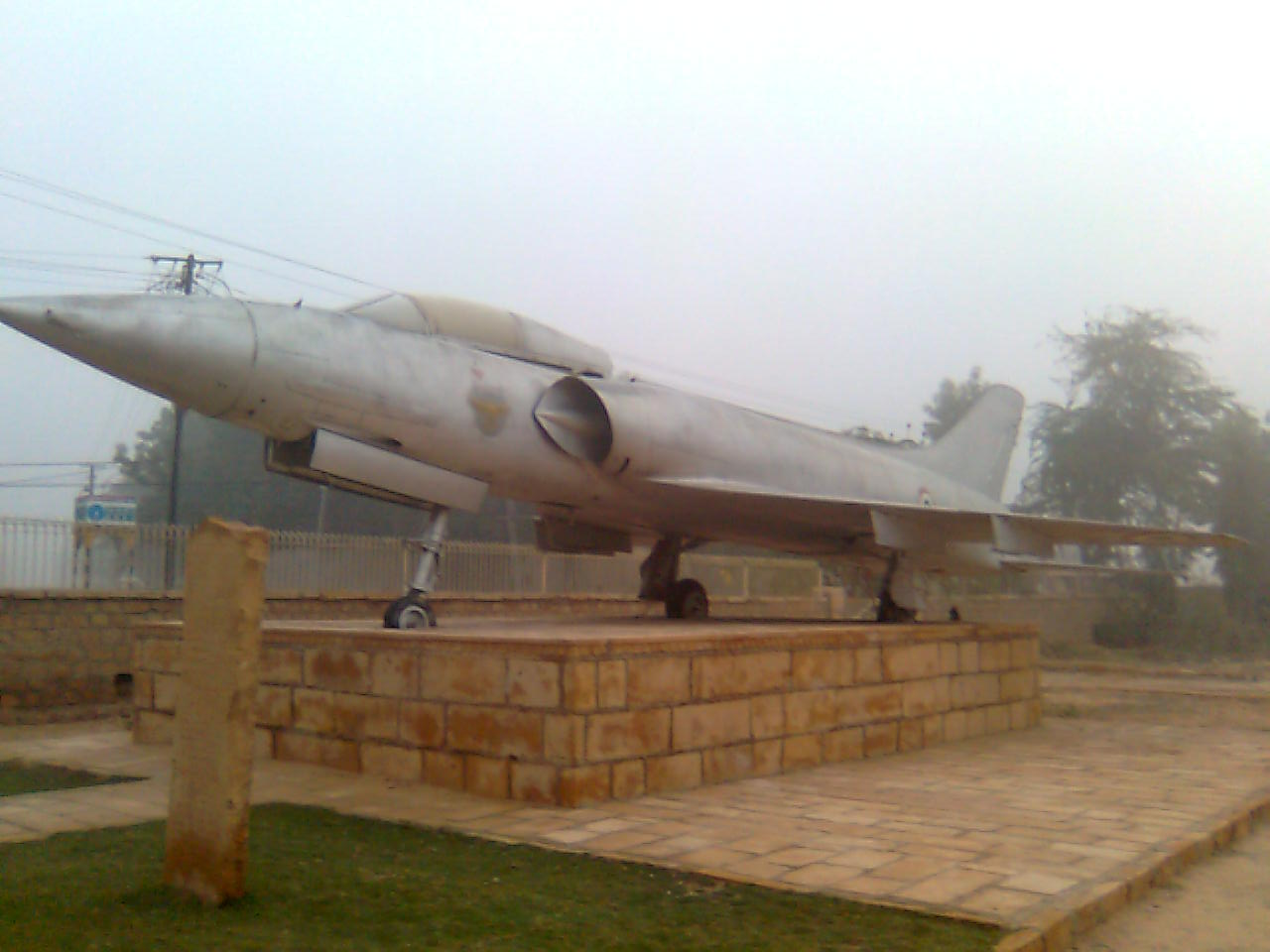
One of the three HAL Marut used by the IAF against Pakistani armour at Longewala

During the night of the 4th, Dharamvir's platoon, while on a patrol, detected noises across the border that suggested a large number of armoured vehicles approaching. These were soon confirmed by reports—from the Army's air observation post aircraft flown by Major Atma Singh—in the area of a 20-kilometre-long (12 mi) armoured column on the track leading to the post advancing in the general direction of the Longewala post. Directing Dharamvir Bhakhri's patrol to trail the advancing armoured column, Chandpuri contacted battalion headquarters, requesting urgent reinforcements and armour and artillery support. Battalion headquarters gave him the choice of staying put and containing the attack as much as possible, or carrying out a tactical retreat to Ramgarh, as reinforcements would not be available that night. Despite his command having all the transportation to retreat back on time, he chose to stay and fight back the advancing enemy.

The Pakistani forces began their attack at 12:30 am. As the offensive approached the lone outpost, Pakistani artillery opened up across the border with medium artillery, killing five of the ten camels from the BSF detachment. As the column of 45 tanks neared the post, Indian defences, lacking the time to lay a prepared minefield, laid a hasty anti-tank minefield as the enemy advanced, one infantryman being killed in the process. The Indian infantry held their fire until the leading Pakistani tanks had approached to within 15–30 metres (49–98 ft) before firing their PIATs. They accounted for the first two tanks on the track with their Jonga-mounted 106 mm M40 recoilless rifle, with one of its crew being killed during the engagement. This weapon proved quite effective because it was able to engage the thinner top armour of the Pakistani tanks from its elevated position, firing at often stationary, bogged-down vehicles.

In all, the post defenders claimed 12 tanks destroyed or damaged. The initial Pakistani attack stalled almost immediately when the infantry discovered the barbed wire which had not been spotted in the night, and interpreted it as signifying a minefield. Firing for the Indian RCL crews was made easier by the flames of fires when the spare fuel tanks on the Pakistani tanks, intended to supplement their internal capacity for the advance to Jaisalmer, exploded, providing ample light for Indians located on higher ground, and creating a dense, acrid smoke screen at ground level for the Pakistani infantry, adding to the confusion. Two hours were lost as Pakistani sappers were brought up, only to discover there was no minefield. However, at this time, Pakistani infantry were required to make another attack, from a different direction, but in the dawn light. The Pakistani advance then attempted to surround the post two hours later by vehicles getting off the road, but many vehicles, particularly armoured personnel carriers and tanks, in trying to soften up the Indian defenders before attacking, became bogged down in the soft sand of the area surrounding the post. Throughout the engagement, Chandpuri continued to direct the supporting artillery fire.

Although massively outnumbering the Indian defenders and having surrounded them, the Pakistani troops were unable to advance over open terrain on a full-moon night, under small arms and mortar fire from the outpost. This encouraged the Indians not to give up their strong defensive position, frustrating the Pakistani commanders. As dawn arrived, the Pakistan forces had still not taken the post, and were now faced with doing so in full daylight.

In the morning, the Indian Air Force was finally able to direct the newly assembled 122 Squadron under the command of WC Donald Melvyn Conquest comprising HAL HF-24 Maruts and Hawker Hunter aircraft to assist the post; they were not outfitted with night-vision equipment, and so had to wait until dawn. With daylight, however, the IAF was able to operate effectively, with the strike aircraft being guided to targets by the airborne Forward Air Controller (FAC), Singh, in a HAL Krishak observation aircraft. The Indian aircraft attacked the Pakistani ground troops with 16 Matra T-10 rockets and 30 mm ADEN cannons on each aircraft. Without support from the Pakistan Air Force, which was busy elsewhere, the tanks and other armoured vehicles were easy targets for the IAF's Hunters. The range of the 12.7 mm anti-aircraft heavy machine guns mounted on the tanks was limited and therefore ineffective against the Indian jets. Indian air attacks were made easier by the barren terrain. Many IAF officers later described the attack as a "turkey shoot", signifying the lopsidedness.

By noon the next day, the assault had ended completely, having cost Pakistan 36 tanks, 22 of which were destroyed by aircraft fire, 12 by ground anti-tank fire, and 2 captured after being abandoned, with a total of around 100 vehicles destroyed or damaged in the desert around the post. This battle was a major event against the Pakistani war effort since their army had an approximate ~200 tanks, 36 of which were destroyed in one battle. The Pakistani forces were forced to withdraw when Indian tanks from the division's cavalry regiment, the 20th Lancers, commanded by Colonel Bawa Guruvachan Singh, along with the 17th Battalion, Rajputana Rifles, launched their counter-offensive to end the six-hour engagement. Longewala had proved to be one of the defining moments in the war.

== Aftermath ==
Since the Indians were on the defensive, they managed to inflict heavy losses on the Pakistanis: 200 soldiers killed, 20+ tanks destroyed or abandoned, and 100 additional vehicles lost. The Pakistani judicial commission set up at the end of war recommended the commander of 18th Division, Major General Mustafa, be tried for negligence.

Notwithstanding the Indian victory, there were intelligence and strategic failures on both sides. India's intelligence service failed to provide warning of such a large armoured force in the western sector. Moreover, the defending post was not heavily armed. Finally, they did not push home their advantage and destroy the fleeing Pakistani tanks while the IAF had them on the run. They did, however, destroy or capture some 20+ tanks, one of the most disproportionate tank losses for one side in a single battle after World War II.

The Pakistani troops, meanwhile, had underestimated the post's defensive capability due to the difficulty of approach over sand, conducting the attack at night and in full-moon light, against stiff resistance from a well-prepared defensive position located on a dominant height. Attacking with virtually no air cover, they took too long to close for an assault on the position, and failed to anticipate the availability of Indian close air support. Given that Pakistan's Sherman tanks and T-59/Type 59 Chinese tanks were slow on the sandy Thar Desert, some military analysts have opined that the attack may have been poorly planned and executed, given the terrain. Some Pakistani tanks suffered engine failure due to overheating in trying to extricate themselves, and were abandoned. The open desert battleground provided little to no cover for the tanks and infantry from air attacks. The plan to capture Longewala may have been good in conception, but failed due to lack of air cover. As a result, two tank regiments failed to take Longewala.

Maj. Kuldip Singh Chandpuri, MVC, VSM

For his bravery and leadership, the Indian company commander, Chandpuri, was decorated with the Maha Vir Chakra, India's second-highest gallantry award. Several other members of the defending company also received honours for their bravery, including Sub. Ratan Singh, who was awarded the Vir Chakra, along with the battalion's commander. On the other hand, the Pakistani divisional commander was dismissed from service.

British media reported on the defence of Longewala; James Hatter compared the Battle of Longewala to Battle of Thermopylae in his article Taking on the enemy at Longewala, describing it as the deciding moment of the 1971 war. Similarly, Field Marshal R. M. Carver, the Chief of the General Staff (United Kingdom) at the time, visited Longewala a few weeks after the war to learn the details of the battle from Chandpuri.

In 2008, the battle was the subject of some disagreement, some officers of the time ascribing all the combat success to the IAF. This led to Chandpuri suing for the token amount of one rupee.

== In popular culture ==
The Battle of Longewala was famously depicted in the 1997 Hindi film Border, directed by J. P. Dutta. The film stars Sunny Deol as Major Kuldip Singh Chandpuri, alongside Jackie Shroff as Wing Commander Andy Bajwa (a character based on Wing Commander M. S. Bawa), Suniel Shetty as BSF officer Bhairon Singh Rathore, Akshaye Khanna as Dharamvir Bhakhri, Puneet Issar as Subedar Ratan Singh, Sudesh Berry as Mathura Das, and Kulbhushan Kharbanda as Bhagiram. Some criticism of the film focused on its portrayal of the Indian forces as being in a dire position before any support from the Indian Air Force (IAF) arrived.

India has built the Longewala War Memorial at Longewala, and the Sadhewala War Memorial 15 km north-east of Longewala, which are part of Bharat Ranbhoomi Darshan initiative of the Indian Military which entails 77 battleground war memorials in border area including Siachen base camp, Kargil, Galwan, Pangong Tso, Rezang La, Doklam, Bum La, Cho La, Kibithu, etc. This will boost border tourism, patriotism, local infrastructure and economy while reversing civilian outward migration from these remote locations.

== See also ==
- India–Pakistan war of 1971
- Timeline of the Bangladesh Liberation War
- Military plans of the Bangladesh Liberation War
- Mitro Bahini order of battle
- Pakistan Army order of battle, December 1971
- Battle of Chamb
- Evolution of Pakistan Eastern Command plan
- 1971 Bangladesh genocide
- Operation Searchlight
- Indo-Pakistani wars and conflicts
- Military history of India
- List of military disasters
- List of wars involving India
- Border (1997 film)
- Border 2 (2026 film)
