= Chandpur Rurki =

- Village
- Location in Punjab, India Chandpur Rurki (India)
- Coordinates: 31.2140761°N 76.2371859°E
- Country: India
- State: Punjab
- District: Shaheed Bhagat Singh Nagar

Government
  - Type: Panchayat raj
  - Body: Gram panchayat
- Elevation: 251 m (823 ft)

Population (2011)
  - Total: 2,361

Languages
  - Official: Punjabi
- Time zone: UTC+5:30 (IST)
- PIN: 144524
- Telephone code: 01884
- ISO 3166 code: IN-PB
- Sex ratio: 913 ♂/♀
- Post office: Saroa
- Website: nawanshahr.nic.in

Chandpur Rurki is a village in Shaheed Bhagat Singh Nagar district of Punjab State, India. It is located 5.1 kilometres (3.2 mi) away postal head office Saroa, 27.4 kilometres (17.0 mi) from Banga, 31 kilometres (19 mi) from district headquarter Shaheed Bhagat Singh Nagar and 95.6 kilometres (59.4 mi) from state capital Chandigarh. The village is administrated by Sarpanch an elected representative of the village.

== Demography ==
As of 2011, Chandpur Rurki has a total number of 493 houses and population of 2361 of which 1234 include are males while 1127 are females according to the report published by Census India in 2011. The literacy rate of Chandpur Rurki is 71.49%, lower than the state average of 75.84%. The population of children under the age of 6 years is 274 which is 11.61% of total population of Chandpur Rurki, and child sex ratio is approximately 1000 as compared to Punjab state average of 846.

Most of the people are from Schedule Caste which constitutes 16.22% of total population in Chandpur Rurki. The town does not have any Schedule Tribe population so far.

As per the report published by Census India in 2011, 772 people were engaged in work activities out of the total population of Chandpur Rurki which includes 573 males and 199 females. According to census survey report 2011, 97.2% workers describe their work as main work and 2.98% workers are involved in Marginal activity providing livelihood for less than 6 months.

== Education ==
The village has a Punjabi medium, co-ed upper primary with secondary school founded in 1970. The schools provide mid-day meal as per Indian Midday Meal Scheme. As per Right of Children to Free and Compulsory Education Act the school provide free education to children between the ages of 6 and 14. Amardeep Singh Shergill Memorial college Mukandpur and Sikh National College Banga are the nearest colleges.

== Landmarks ==
The village has a historical Sikh temple situated on the entrance of the village Gurudwara Baba Gurditta which dedicated to Baba Gurditta the eldest son of sixth Sikh Guru, Guru Hargobind. Baba Gurditta visited this place along with his two associates and stayed here for a night. A chain has been preserved in the Gurdwara which used by Baba Gurditta to tied his horse. A fair held at the Gurudwara on the Prakash Utsav of Baba Gurdita every year which attracts a large number of devotees.

== Transport ==
Garhshankar train station is the nearest train station however, Nawanshahr railway station is 23 kilometres (14 mi) away from the village. Sahnewal Airport is the nearest domestic airport which located 77 kilometres (48 mi) away in Ludhiana and the nearest international airport is located in Chandigarh also Sri Guru Ram Dass Jee International Airport is the second nearest airport which is 167 kilometres (104 mi) away in Amritsar.

== See also ==
- Kuldip Singh Chandpuri
- List of villages in India
