= Punjab Regiment (India) =

Regiment of the Indian Army

- Regimental Insignia of the Punjab Regiment
- Active: 1761 – Present
- Country: India
- Branch: Indian Army
- Type: Line Infantry
- Size: 21 Battalions
- Regimental Centre: Ramgarh Cantonment, Jharkhand
- Mottos: Khushki wa Tari/Sthal Wa Jal (By Land and Sea)
- War Cry: Jo Bole So Nihal, Sat Sri Akal (Shout Aloud in Ecstasy, True is the Immortal Lord!) (Sikh); Bol Jawala Ma ki jai (say victory to Mother Jawala) (Hindu)
- Decorations: • Victoria Cross - 11 • Military Cross - 187 • Padma Bhushan- 02 • Padma Shri- 01 • MVC- 18 • KC- 18 • PVSM- 08 • UYSM- 02 • AVSM- 10 • VrC- 69 • SC- 56 • YSM- 05 • VSM- 33 • SM- 287 • MiD- 156
- Battle honours: Post Independence Zojila, Icchogil, Dograi, Burki, Kalidhar, Bedori, Nangi Tekri, Brachil Pass, Longewala and Garibpur

Commanders
- Colonel of the Regiment: Lt Gen Vijay B Nair

Insignia
- Regimental Insignia: A Galley with a bank of oars and sail
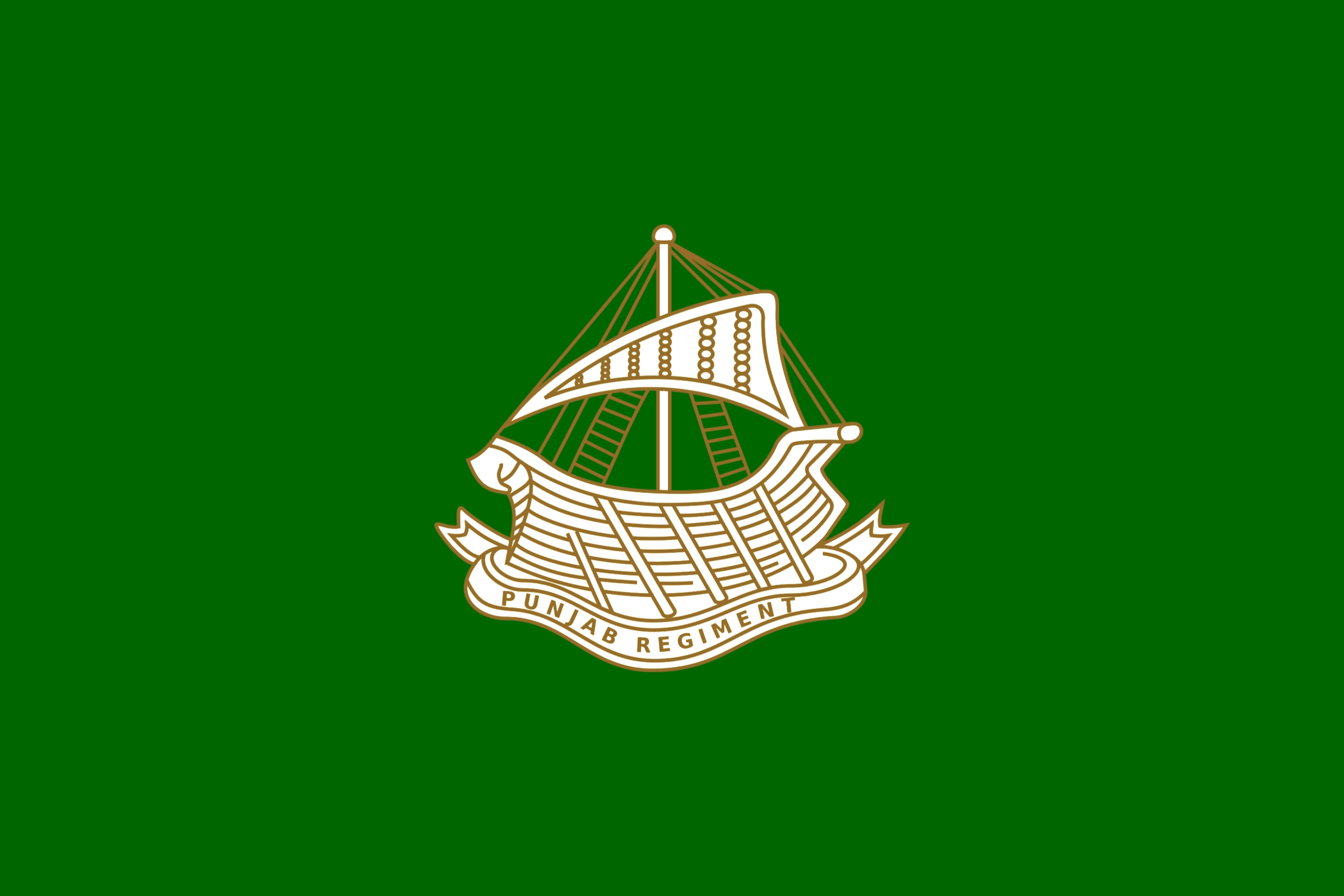
- Flag of The Regiment

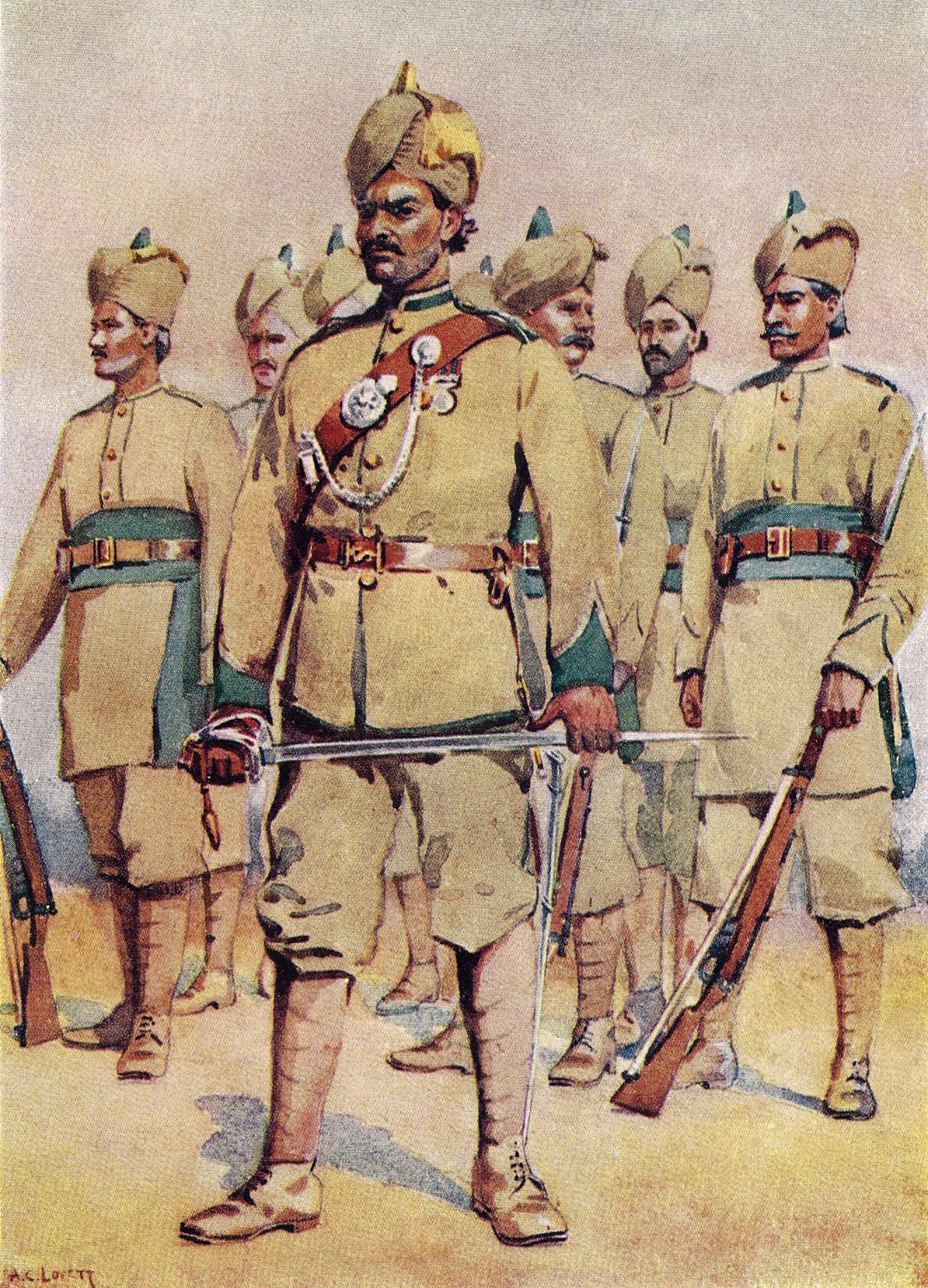
The 33rd Punjabi Regiment (now with the Pakistan Army) (A Picture of an Officer: A Punjabi Subadar).

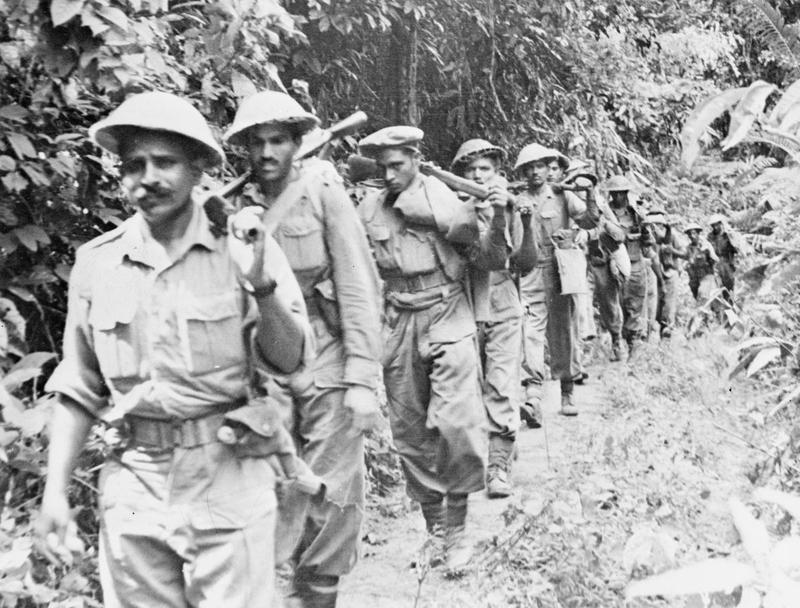
Men of a Punjab Regiment march out of the jungle near Pyagle, Burma, 1945.

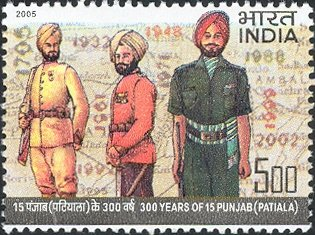
2005 postal stamp on 300 years of 15 Punjab (former 1st Patiala)

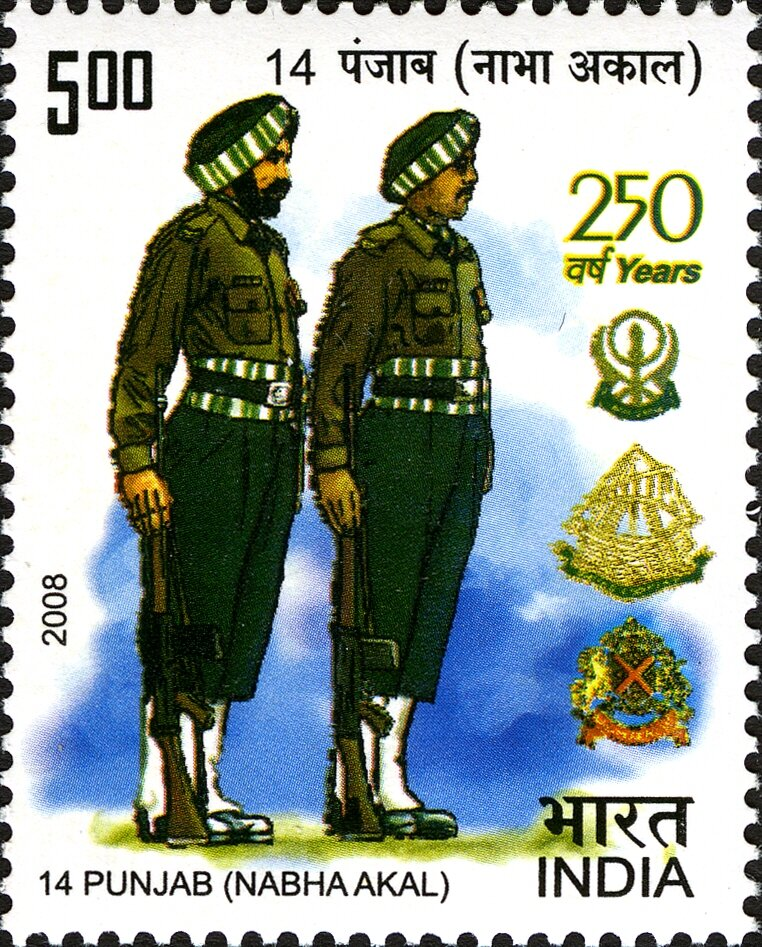
2008 postal stamp on 250 years of the 14th Battalion - (former Nabha Akal Infantry)

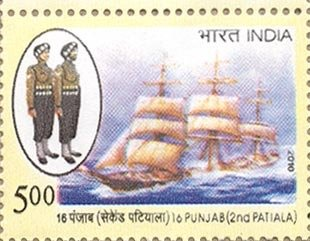
2010 postal stamp on 16th Battalion - (former 2nd Patiala)

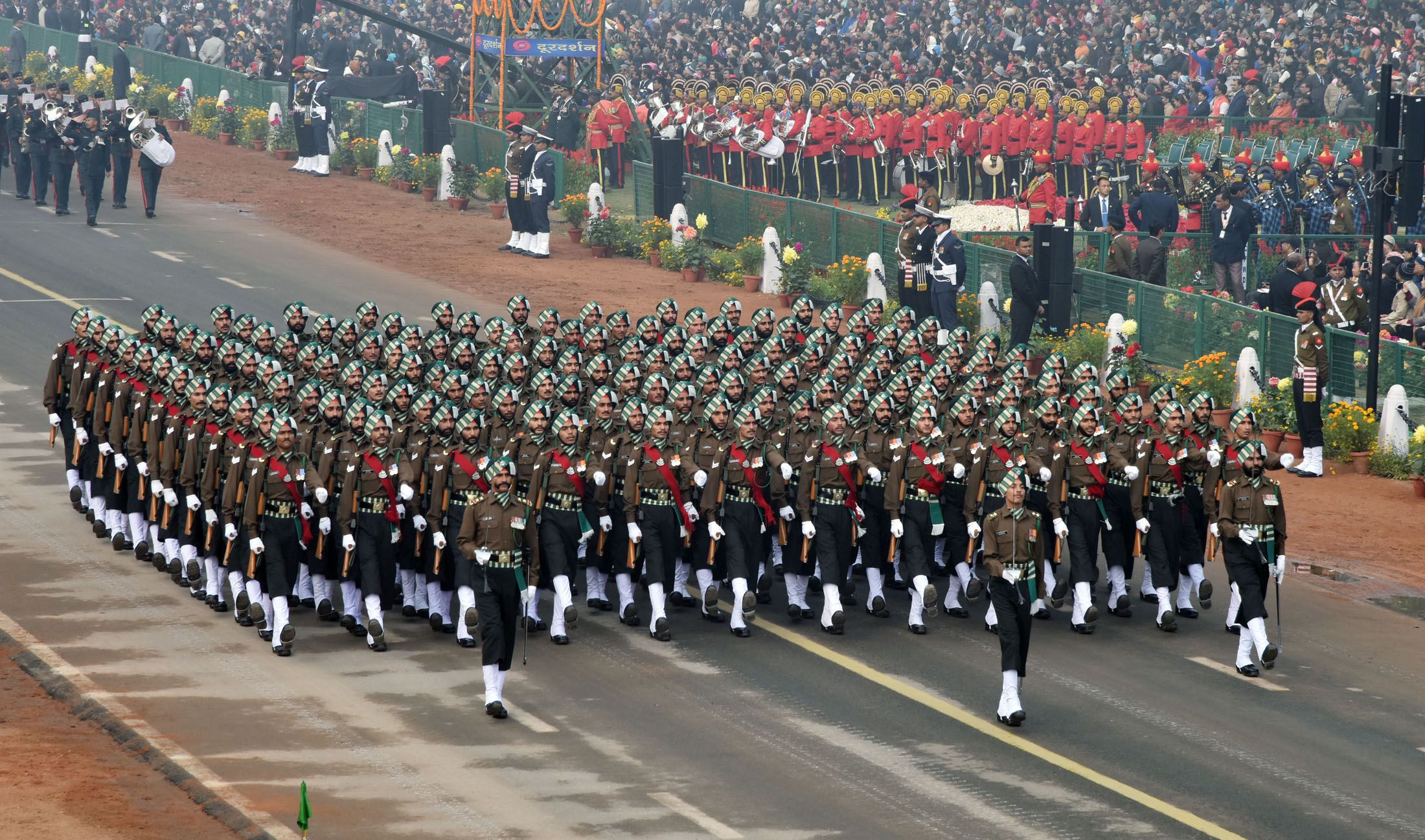
The Punjab Regiment Marching Contingent passes through the Rajpath, on the occasion of the 69th Republic Day Parade, 2018

The Punjab Regiment is the second oldest regiment still in service in the Indian Army, and is the most senior regional infantry regiment. It was formed from the 2nd Punjab Regiment of the British Indian Army in 1947 and has taken part in various battles and wars since, winning numerous honours for the same.

Prior to independence and partition there were a number of "Punjab Regiments" in the British Indian Army. These were amalgamated to form six regiments: the 1st Punjab Regiment, the 2nd Punjab Regiment, the 8th Punjab Regiment, the 14th Punjab Regiment, the 15th Punjab Regiment and the 16th Punjab Regiment. At the onset of independence in 1947, the 1st, 8th, 14th, 15th and 16th Punjab Regiments went over to the newly raised Pakistan Army, while the 2nd Punjab Regiment was retained in the Indian Army. Troops were transferred between regiments based on whether the soldiers would be a part of Pakistan or India.

== History ==
=== 1705: Origin ===
The Punjab Regiment is one of the oldest in the Indian Army. The first battalion which today constitutes this regiment was raised in 1705, by the then Maharaja of Patiala. The first four British-raised battalions of what later became the 2nd Punjab Regiment and finally the Punjab Regiment, were raised during the hostilities in the Carnatic in South India between 1761 and 1776. The first and second battalions were moved to other regiments and the fourth battalion was disbanded. The third battalion still continues as part of the regiment. The numbers and titles of the battalions changed during the successive reorganisations of the Madras Presidency Army, the British Indian Army and the Indian Army during the 18th, 19th and 20th centuries. The names changed from Coast Sepoys to Carnatic Infantry, Madras Native Infantry, Punjabis and finally to the Punjab Regiment. After the Indian Rebellion of 1857, the British applied the martial races theory and north Indian troops replaced the south Indians, the regiment eventually being renamed as the Punjab Regiment.

=== 1857: Indian Independence War ===
The Punjab Movable Column was established as a rapid-response force during the Indian Rebellion of 1857, primarily to secure the Punjab and provide reinforcements for the Siege of Delhi. Following the fall of Delhi in September 1857, the column, previously commanded by John Nicholson, was reorganized into smaller pursuit units, most notably Greathed's Movable Column, which conducted operations across the Doab and participated in the Siege of Lucknow. The native infantry and cavalry units that formed the backbone of the column—including the 1st, 2nd, and 4th Punjab Infantry—were eventually integrated into the Punjab Irregular Force (PIF), popularly known as the "Piffers". In 1865, this body was renamed the Punjab Frontier Force, gaining distinction for its role in mountain warfare along the North-West Frontier.

=== Post-World wars reorganisation ===
The 1st battalion of the 2nd Punjab Regiment initially formed part of the 44th Airborne Division in an airborne role on the disbandment of the Parachute Regiment in 1946 and was called 1st battalion, 2nd Punjab Regiment (Para). The unit retained most of the Punjab Regiment's uniform, but adopted the maroon beret in 1946, qualification wings and allied insignias of airborne forces.

=== Post-partition of India reorganisation ===
Following the Partition of India in 1947, the "Piffer" units were divided; while the majority of the infantry regiments formed the core of the Frontier Force Regiment in the Pakistan Army, several components were absorbed into the Indian Army, specifically influencing the lineage of the Punjab Regiment and the Brigade of the Guards. The European units of the original column, such as the HM 52nd Light Infantry, returned to regular British service and were later integrated into the reorganized British Indian Army under the Government of India Act 1858.

In 1951, four experienced battalions of the former princely states of Punjab joined the Punjab Regiment. These were a battalion each from the Jind and Nabha State Forces and the first and second Battalions of Patiala Infantry. They were designated as the 13th, 14th, 15th and 16th battalions of the Punjab Regiment. Additional battalions have been raised since 1963.

In 1952, when the Parachute Regiment was re-raised and a Regimental Centre formed, the 1st battalion, 2nd Punjab Regiment (Para) became the first battalion of the Parachute Regiment and was renamed as the 1st battalion, Parachute Regiment (Punjab). The uniform changed to the Parachute Regiment's, but the battalion retained the Punjab Regiment's hackle on its headgear. The maroon beret is currently exclusive to the Parachute Regiment, Para (Special Forces), and other parachute-qualified personnel in airborne formations. The Punjab Regiment (the parent infantry regiment) wears the standard Rifle Green (Dark Green) beret. Even when a soldier from the Punjab Regiment is parachute-qualified, they only don the maroon beret while actively posted to an airborne formation; upon returning to a standard infantry battalion, they revert to the regimental Rifle Green headgear, though they may continue to wear their parachute wings on their right sleeve.

=== Existing 15 Punjab ===
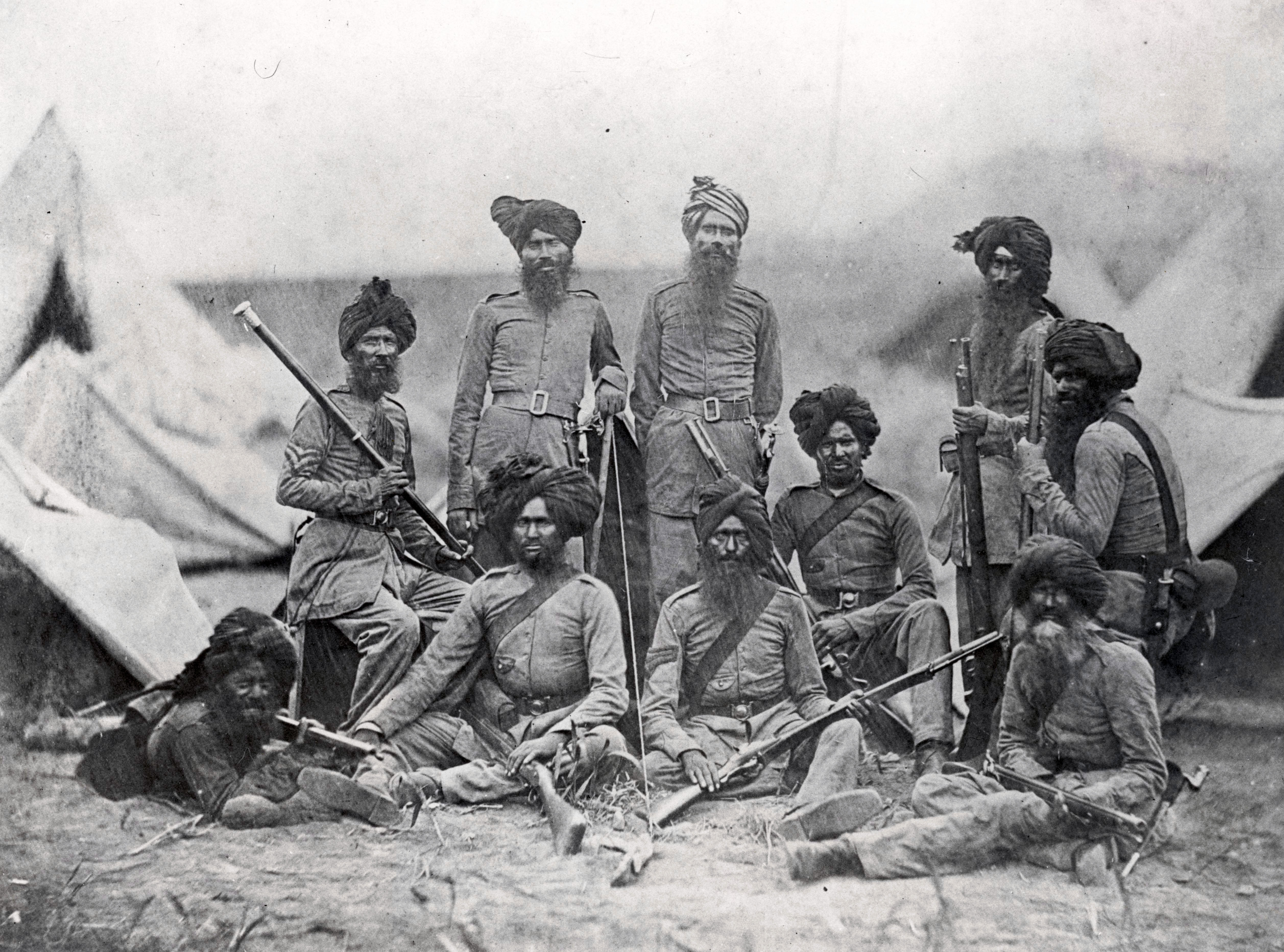
Sikh officers of the British 15th Punjab Infantry regiment, 1858 by Felice Beato.

15 Punjab (formerly First Patiala) completed 300 years of service on 13 April 2005. The battalion was raised on the auspicious Baisakhi Shri Guru Gobind Singh Ji day in 1705 by Baba Alla Singh, the founder of Patiala State. It was the first battalion of the state forces of the Maharaja of Patiala. Apart from being the oldest infantry battalion in the Indian Army, 15 Punjab also has the proud distinction of being the second highest decorated battalion of the Army, with 22 Battle Honours, one Theatre Honour (Punjab) and numerous gallantry awards. The battalion took part in numerous campaigns in India and abroad, carving a mark for itself in every operation. In May 1900, the battalion was re-designated as First Patiala Imperial Service Infantry (Rajindra Sikh). During World War I, it took part in operations in the Middle East under the British Expeditionary Force. In 1932, the battalion was re-designated as First Patiala Rajindra Sikh Infantry. During World War II, the battalion participated in the Burma Campaign. It successfully cut off the Japanese lines of communication, thus halting their advance towards India. Thereafter, the battalion sailed to Port Dickson for action in Malaya and Batavia (now Java).

=== Existing 2 Punjab ===
2 Punjab (now 1st battalion, Brigade of the Guards) was raised in 1762 as the tenth battalion of the Coastal Sepoys and has been redesignated eighteen times since then. The troop composition of the unit was changed to a North Zone Battalion in 1902 and the unit was redesignated as 69 Punjab. In 1922, the unit was redesignated as 2nd battalion, 2 Punjab Regiment. The battalion, by virtue of its seniority and efficiency, was handpicked by the then Chief of the Army Staff, Gen. (later Field Marshal) K. M. Cariappa to be redesignated as 1st battalion, Brigade of the Guards, in April 1951. Lt. Col. (later Brigadier) Shivinder Singh was the first commanding officer of the battalion. Since then, 22 commanding officers have commanded the battalion. Of them, Lt. Col. M.C.S Menon, Lt. Col. Sehdev Sahgal and Lt. Col. P.P Singh retired as Generals.

== UN Peacekeeping Operations ==
In recent years, the Punjab Regiment has contributed towards UN peacekeeping missions by sending six of its battalions overseas: 3 Punjab to Gaza, 14 Punjab to Angola, 15 and 26 Punjab to Lebanon, and 16 and 24 Punjab to Democratic Republic of the Congo.

== Regimental Centre ==
The Regimental Centre was first raised at Loralai and was shifted to Multan in 1922, Meerut in 1929 and its present location in Ramgarh Cantonment, Jharkhand, in 1976.

== Units ==
- 3rd Battalion
- 9th Battalion
- 13th Battalion - (former Jind Infantry) - Princely State Forces unit of Imperial Service Troops
- 14th Battalion - (former Nabha Akal Infantry) - Princely State Forces unit of Imperial Service Troops
- 15th Battalion - (former 1st Patiala Rajinder Sikh Infantry) - Princely State Forces unit of Imperial Service Troops
- 16th Battalion - (former 2nd Patiala Yadvinder Infantry) - Princely State Forces unit of Imperial Service Troops
- 17th Battalion
- 18th Battalion
- 19th Battalion
- 20th Battalion
- 21st Battalion
- 22nd Battalion
- 23rd Battalion (Longewala)
- 24th Battalion
- 25th Battalion
- 26th Battalion
- 27th Battalion
- 28th Battalion
- 29th Battalion
- 30th Battalion
- 31st Battalion

Territorial Army (TA)

- 102nd Infantry Battalion Territorial Army (Punjab) : Kalka, Haryana
- 150th Infantry Battalion Territorial Army (Punjab) : New Delhi
- 156th Infantry Battalion Territorial Army (Punjab) (Home and Hearth) Punjab: Rajouri, Jammu & Kashmir

Rashtriya Rifles (RR)

- 7th Battalion Rashtriya Rifles
- 22nd Battalion Rashtriya Rifles
- 37th Battalion Rashtriya Rifles
- 53rd Battalion Rashtriya Rifles

Others:

- 1st Battalion is now 1st Battalion, Parachute Regiment (Special Forces)
- 2nd Battalion is now 1st Battalion, Brigade of the Guards (Mechanized)
- 4th Battalion was disbanded in 1938
- 7th Battalion is now 8th Battalion, Mechanised Infantry Regiment
- 8th Battalion was disbanded after World War II
- 10th Battalion is the Punjab Regimental Centre

The regiment has an affiliation with INS Ranjit, a heavy destroyer of the Indian Navy.

== Class Composition ==
The original battalions of the regiment that were transferred to India after 1947 were composed primarily of Sikh and Dogra soldiers who belonged to the districts of Punjab that were given to Pakistan. However the second and third generations for the regiment were recruited both among this refugee community but recruitment was opened up to all castes and communities of Punjab, Haryana, Jammu and Himachal Pradesh in the late 1960s. The regiment currently consists of Dogras and Sikhs primarily drawn from north Indian regions of Jammu, Himachal Pradesh and Punjab. However, as an exception, two regular battalions (19 and 27 Punjab) have troops from other Indian castes as well.

== Key Battles ==
=== Battle of Longewala ===
During the Indo-Pakistan War of 1971, A Company (reinforced) of the 23rd battalion, Punjab Regiment, consisting of about 120 soldiers under the command of Major (later Brigadier) Kuldip Singh Chandpuri, fought off an assault by a brigade of the Pakistan Army. The battle was fought at the desert border post of Longewala, Rajasthan. The unit fought during the last five hours of the night of 5 December 1971 unsupported as the Indian Air Force aircraft at the time did not have night attack capabilities. For his leadership during the battle, Maj. Chandpuri was decorated with the Maha Vir Chakra, the second highest gallantry award in India.

== Regimental Insignia ==
The regiment is perhaps the only infantry regiment with naval galley as an insignia, anywhere. It was awarded to 69th Punjabis (later 2nd Punjab) in recognition of the readiness to serve overseas, after the battalion had fought in eight overseas campaigns by 1824.

== Battle honours ==
=== Pre-Independence ===
Sholinghur, Carnatic, Mysore, Mehidpore, Ava, China, Pegu, Lucknow, Burma, Afghanistan, Laos, Flanders, Hellis, Krithia, Gallipoli, Suez, Egypt, Sharon, Nablus, Palestine, Aden, Kut-al-Amara, Baghdad, Mesopotamia, North Western Frontier, Mersa Metruh, Buthidaung, Ngakyedauk Pass, Imphal, Kangla Tongbi, Tonzang, Kennedy Peak, Meiktila, Pyinmana, Malaya, Ipoh, Singapore, Kern and Casa Bettini.

=== Post-Independence ===
Zoji La, Ichhogil, Dograi, Barki, Kalidhar, Bedori, Nangi Tekri, Brachil Pass, Laungewala, Garibpur, Chak Amaru and Jessore.

== In fiction ==
Films

- Border, a 1997 war film directed by J. P. Dutta, depicts the Battle of Longewala during the India-Pakistan war of 1971. Sunny Deol portrayed Major Kuldip Singh Chandpuri, who led a small company of the 23rd Battalion, Punjab Regiment, in a successful defensive action against heavily armoured Pakistani forces.
- Lakshya, a 2004 Bollywood film depicting the Kargil War, places the protagonist (played by Hrithik Roshan) as an acting captain in 3 Punjab.

== See also ==
- List of regiments of the Indian Army
- Punjab Regiment (Pakistan)
