= Jonga =

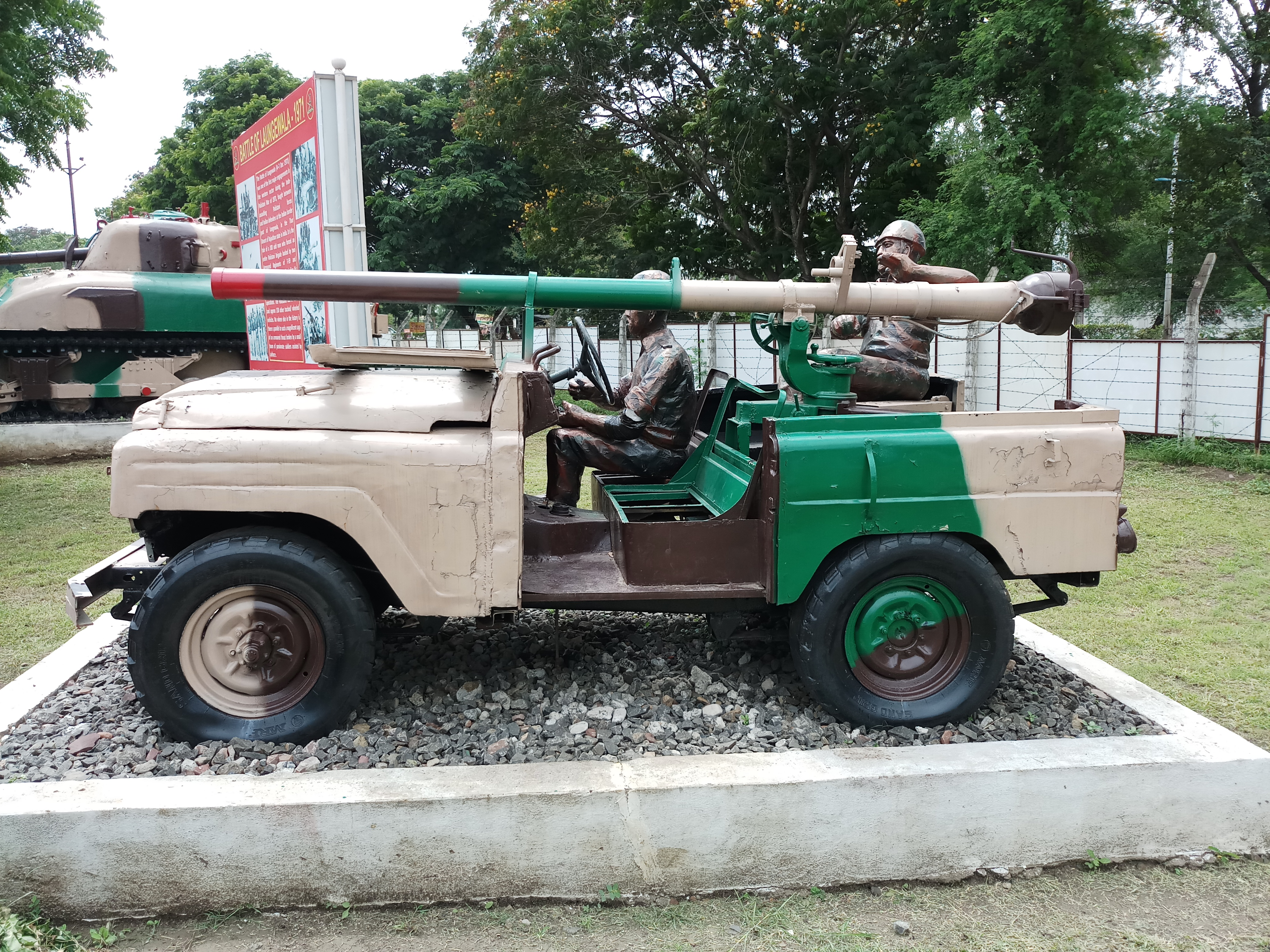
- Jonga, mounted with 105 mm RCL gun which destroyed most of the tanks during the 1965 and 1971 Indo-Pakistani wars
- Type: Mid-size off road vehicle
- Place of origin: India

Service history
- In service: 1969–1999

Production history
- Manufacturer: Vehicle Factory Jabalpur
- Produced: 1969–1999
- Variants: See Variants

Specifications
- Engine: Six-cylinder 3956 cc in-line petrol engine Perkins 3956 cc diesel (IDI engine); 110 hp (82 kW; 112 PS)
- Payload capacity: 250 kilograms (550 lb)
- Transmission: 3-speed manual gearbox

The Jonga is an Indian built second generation Nissan Patrol formerly used by the Indian Army. Jonga is an acronym for Jabalpur Ordnance aNd Guncarriage Assembly, manufactured by the Vehicle Factory Jabalpur. They were produced for the Indian Army under an exclusive license granted by Nissan in 1965.

The vehicle entered service in 1969 and production ceased in 1999. It served as one of the Indian Army's jeeps until it was phased out and replaced mostly by the Mahindra MM540 jeep.

== History ==
The Indian Army showed an interest at the Nissan Patrol P60 and the Nissan 4W73 (also called the Nissan Carrier) in the 1960s. A decision was made to prioritize the eventual production of the jeeps in the aftermath of the Sino-Indian War. The factory manufacturing the Jonga was commissioned for a cost of Rs. 12.06 crores by November 1965. The costs were revised again twice; firstly, in December 1970 for Rs. 21.53 crores and again in January 1973 for Rs. 26.84 crores.

The first Jongas made by VFJ were produced in 1969 for military use. A civilian variant of the Jonga was later made in 1996.

In 1999, the production of the Jonga stopped with 100 of them sold to civilians.

In 2013, it was reported that 20,000 Jongas were still in service with the Indian military. It also has reported sales of 2,000 Jongas to the state governments of Kerala, and Jammu and Kashmir.

== Design ==
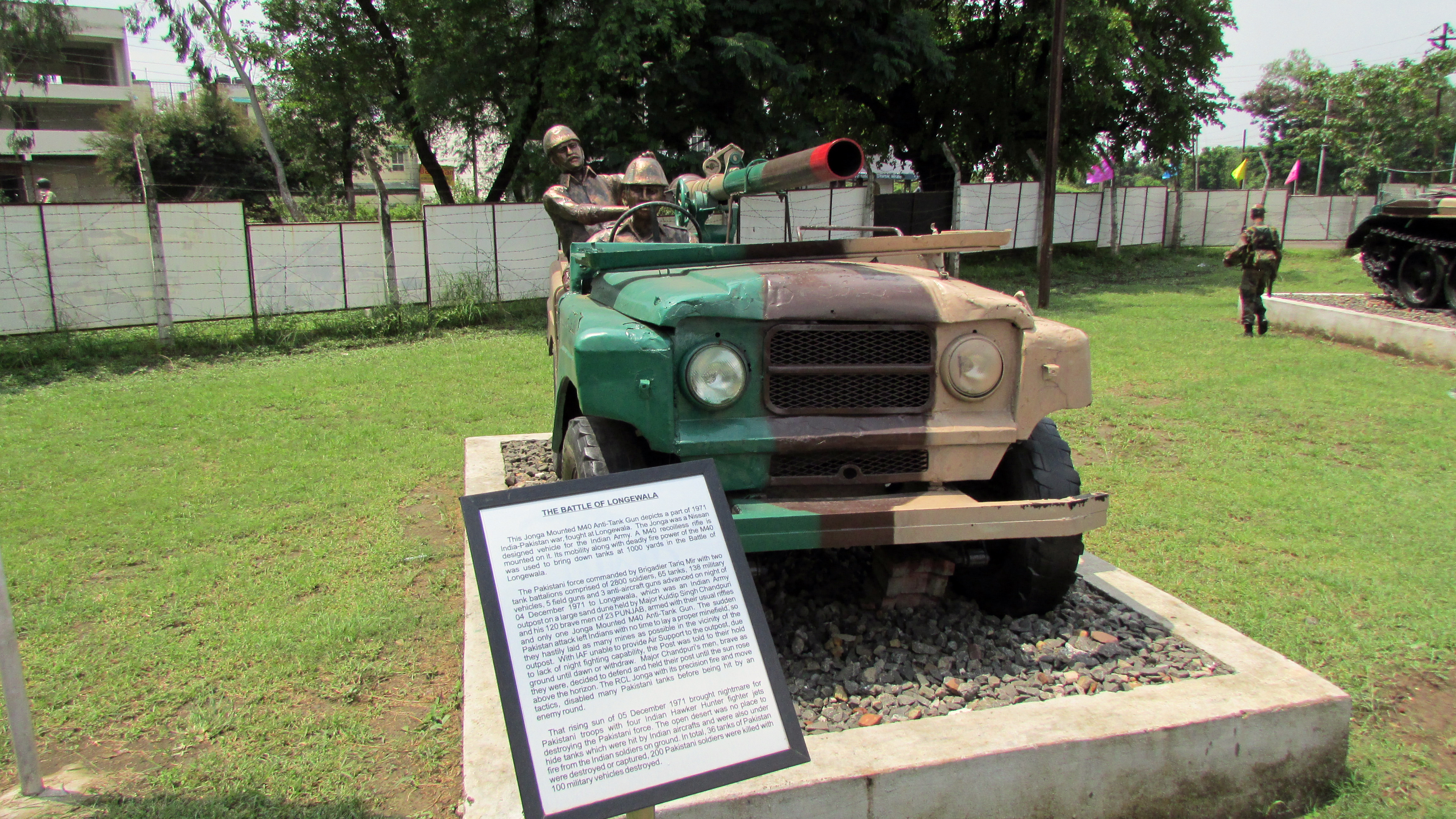
Jonga that destroyed several tanks during battles

While the first 3500 vehicles were directly imported from Japan during the Sino-Indian War (these were the earlier 62-64 Nissan P60, identified by a 3-slot air vent on the windscreen, as well as 2-piece doors. The engine used a Hitachi Carburetor, which had a higher power rating, producing 145Hp and 31.7Kgm of Torque, and the distributor was water sealed too, which allowed a high fording depth of 2.5 feet, compared the Jonga manufactured by VFJ, which inturn was based on the later 64-66 Nissan Patrol P60, identified by a 2-piece air vent on the windscreen, which the single piece doors of the 64-66 patrol were replaced with a 2-piece door, with the lower section similar to the earlier 62-64 Nissan Patrol, but instead of the pressed steel top half of the earlier doors, it used a simple round bar metal frame, and it lacked the glass too, instead replaced with a canvas cover.

The earlier Jonga still used a Hitachi carburetor and a water-sealed distributor, and therefore had a similar power rating to the Nissan Patrol. However, as the indigenous content was increased, the distributor was replaced with a locally sourced unit which lacked the water-sealing of the earlier distributor, therefore fording depth dropped down to 17 inches, while the carburetor was replaced with a locally manufactured Solex unit, abruptly bringing down power rating from 145Hp to 110Hp, and Torque to 27.5kgm.

The French sourced, but locally license manufactured Solex Carburetor - which was quite similar to the unit that replaced the Carter unit on Mahindra license manufactured Willys Jeep, and therefore suffered from similar design flaws as the Jeep unit. This carburetor had a smaller venturi bore compared to the Hitachi carburetor of the original Patrols, the biggest side effect of which was the power rating fell abruptly from 145Hp to 110Hp, and torque suffered too, falling down to just 27.5kgm, while fuel consumption still remained unchanged).

Unlike Full-Floating axles where the wheels are mounted, via bearings, directly onto a stub shaft that is bolted, or sometime welded, into the axle housing, therefore the weight of the vehicle is loaded directly onto the stub shaft and the axle housing, allowing the axle shaft to be used only for connecting engine power to the wheels. A semi-floating axle assembly however, lacks this stub shaft, therefore in this case the axle shaft is used to double up as the weight bearing member of the axle assembly too, which in turn doubles up the stress on the axle shaft too - reason why semi-floating axles have a much larger diameter, especially close to the flange, compared to full-floating axles of similar gross weight rating. While this arrangement allows a semi-floating axle assembly an advantage, a simpler construction and fewer parts, and hence also cheaper than comparative full-floating axle assembly.

The major disadvantage of this design is that in the event an axle shaft is overloaded or fatigued and it snaps, then the axle shaft, along with the bearing as well as the wheel bolted to axle shaft flange, comes right off, which can sometimes turn into quite a dangerous scenario, particularly when the vehicle is traveling at a high speed).

=== Development ===
As the Jonga's design was based on the Nissan P60 and 4W73, it made maintenance easy due to access to COTS parts. In 1996, the VFJ introduced the new 3.0L Hino diesel engine for civilian versions, which was sourced with assistance from Ashok Leyland. It was known for its high ground clearance at 222 mm, its power at 3,800 rpm and peak torque at 1,800 rpm.

The Jonga was originally made for 6 people before changes were made to allow seating capacity for up to 8 people.

In 2014, it was reported that the Advanced Material and Process Research Centre (AMPRI) was working on an aluminum-based composite material, which was used to develop a brake drum from a combination of metal, ceramic and aluminum, and for other automobile components; this was produced in partnership with the Vehicle Research and Development Establishment (VRDE). According to AMPRI, the item was tested by VFJ on a Jonga, which reported an increase in braking efficiency.

== Variants ==
The Jonga was known to be used as a general purpose vehicle, ambulance, gun carrier for recoilless rifles, recon and patrol vehicle.
