= India–China border infrastructure =

Border infrastructure along the Sino-Indian border, which has several border areas disputed by both India and China, encompasses irrigation, roads, railways, airports, natural gas and oil pipelines, electricity grids, telecommunications, and broadcasting. In the context of the border tensions between India and China, many of these infrastructure projects in the borderlands are considered strategic in nature. Commentators have noted the infrastructure gap that existed, and still exists, between the infrastructure on the borderlands of India and China. For many decades, the approach taken to the construction of border infrastructure by China and India was significantly different, however, in terms of utilizing the natural resources of the borderlands for the needs of the country, both countries are said to have a similar approach.

== Context ==
Western Theater Command of China, area under integrated command.

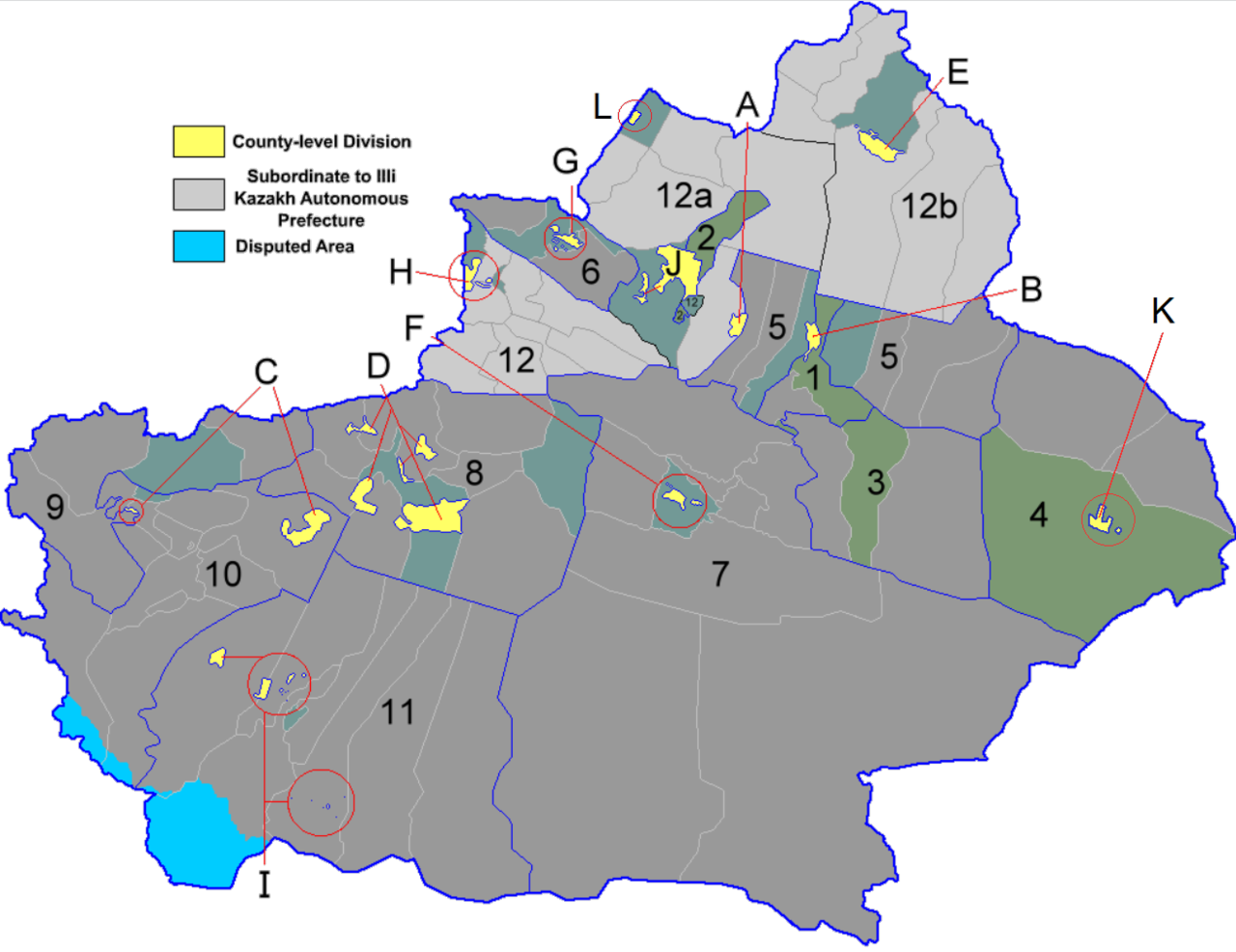
Map of Xinjiang Uyghur Autonomous Region with disputed areas claimed by China shown in blue.

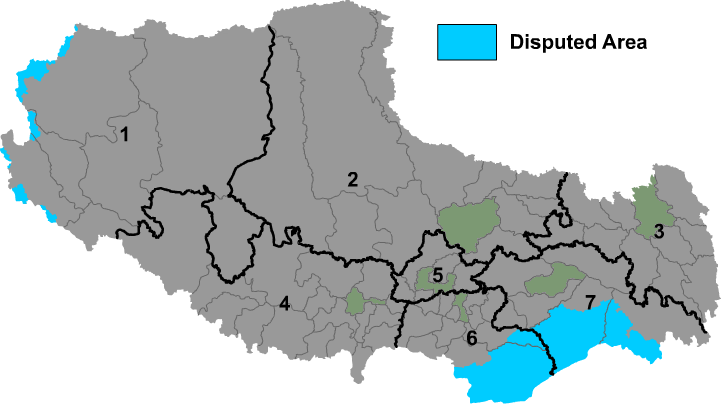
Map of Tibet Autonomous Region with disputed areas claimed by China shown in blue.

The Line of Actual Control (LAC) is the disputed border between India and China, which has led to the ongoing Sino-Indian border dispute. There are designated Border Personnel Meeting Points (BPM Points or BPMP) on LAC, mutually agreed by India and China, for conducting meeting to resolve the dispute.

Chinese Military has an integrated Western Theater Command (WTC) across the whole LAC with India. Western Theater Command also covers provinces of Sichuan, Gansu, Ningxia, Qinghai and Chongqing.

Indian Military has divided the LAC into 3 sectors – the northern sector (some times also called western sector) across Ladakh and the Chinese-held Aksai Chin, the central sector across Himachal Pradesh and Uttrakhand states, and the eastern sector across Sikkim and Arunachal Pradesh states.

== China ==
=== Air infrastructure ===
See China's air infrastructure in Western Theater.

=== Roads ===
China has built several roads along Indian border:

- China National Highway 219 (G219):
  It runs from Kargilik County in Xinjiang to Kargilik County in Tibet. It runs along the China-held and India-claimed Trans-Karakoram Tract (Shakshlgam Valley) to northeast of Sikkim.
- China National Highway 318 (G318):
  It runs from Chengdu in Sichuan to Lhasa north of Sikkim and then to Nyalam near border with Nepal and connects to Kathmandu.
- China National Highway 349 (G349):
  It runs from Lahsa near the India-Bhutan-Tibet border to areas along the Arunachal Pradesh.

=== Railway ===
- Qinghai–Tibet railway (Qingzang railway), existing:
  1,956 km (1,215 mi) long high-elevation railway that connects Xining in Qinghai Province to Lhasa.
- Sichuan–Tibet railway (Sichuan–Xizang railway or Chuanzang railway), planned:
  Will connect Chengdu, the provincial capital of Sichuan, and Lhasa, the provincial capital of Tibet. The line will be 1,629 km (1,012 mi) long, will significantly cut travel time from Chengdu to Lhasa from 48 to 13 hours.

=== China-Pakistan infrastructure ===
China is constructing the China-Pakistan Economic Corridor (CPEC) in Azad Kashmir which is an area claimed by India. India also claims the nearby Trans-Karakoram Tract (Shaksgam Valley) ceded to China by Pakistan. Pakistan and China have also built the strategic Karakoram Highway, which connects Pakistan-held India-claimed Gilgit to Xinjiang.

=== Xiaokang – border defense villages ===
China has developed a number of "xiaokang" or "model well-off border defence villages". The number of villages reportedly– range from 624, and 680, to 965. Some of the new Chinese border villages (with claimed location) are as follows:

- Arunachal Pradesh:
  - Luowa in 2021,
  - Kyungling (Arunachal Pradesh)
- Bhutan:
  - Pangda in 2020.
- Uttarakhand:
  - Tunjum La near Barahoti, shipping container architecture.

== India ==
=== Air infrastructure ===
See the Indian air bases and advanced landing grounds (ALG) along China border.

=== PP – Patrol Points ===
India has identified the specific Patrol Points with the specified route and the maximum depth up to which Indian troops usually patrol into the disputed territory on LAC. Patrolling points provide a truer sense of the extent of India's limits of actual control.

=== Railway ===
Some of that Indian railway projects serving the border with China are:

- Bhanupli–Leh line, planned & approved.

=== Roads & ICBR ===
India has embarked on constructing India-China Border Roads.

=== Telephony and Internet ===
Under the 4G Saturation project, the BSNL will set up 20,000 4G towers in 30,000 border villages at the cost of ₹26,000 crore rupees from the Universal Service Obligation Fund. As of May 2023 the project was already underway and it will be completed in 15 months by 31 July 2024. Today, India has about 640,000 villages, of which 575,000 have been covered by mobile telephony and data connectivity, leaving a gap of 65,000 villages without connectivity, of these 40,000 villages are being covered under the border village plan. Under the 4G saturation plan, the government wants to connect 100% villages with 4G services by 2024.

=== Village infrastructure development ===
India has two non-overlapping distinct schemes, the Vibrant Village Program (VVP) specifically for the Indian villages on border with China and the Border Area Development Programme (BADP) for Indian villages on border with all the neighboring countries including China, Pakistan, Bangladesh, Myanmar, Nepal, Bhutan, etc.

==== VVP – Vibrant Village Program ====
Vibrant Village Program (VVP) has matured into a strategic centerpiece of India's frontier policy, designed to reverse outward migration by transforming remote outposts into self-sustaining hubs through comprehensive infrastructure, 24/7 renewable energy, and "Digital Village" initiatives including 4G/5G-ready telecom masts and SMART classes for distance education. The scheme prioritizes livelihood generation and job creation by integrating youth and women into eco-tourism circuits, agri-cooperatives, and high-value medicinal plant extraction hubs, while leveraging CSR-PPP collaborations for localized logistics and "Skill India" vocational centers. The district administrator prepares the district and village level plans with the help of grampanchayats (elected Village council) in a "hub & spokes" based growth centers model by identifying natural & human resources to develop tourism & eco-agriculture, comprehensive infrastructure including electricity, communications, healthcare, roads, startups, social enterprises, youth and woman entered empowerment, etc. to stop the outward migration. NGOs, self help groups (SHG) and cooperatives will also be included.

VVP Phase I (2022–2026) is complete, which was a Centrally-Sponsored Scheme (with Centre vs State share of 60%:40% non-hill and 90%:10% hill- states) with an outlay of ₹4,500 crore (US$470 million) (including ₹2,500 crore (US$260 million) for roads) covering 662 priority villages across the India-China border. To boost the astrotourism in India, the government had setting up observatories at Jadhang and some other places under this program.

VVP Phase II (2025–2029), is a 100% Union-funded Central Sector Scheme with a ₹6,839 crore (US$710 million) budget, covering additional 1,954 villages across 17 States and UTs abutting all international land borders, including those with Pakistan and Bangladesh.

==== BADP – Border Area Development Programme ====
The Border Area Development Programme (BADP) was initiated in the 1980s along the western border with Pakistan. By June 2020, the scheme covered nearly 400 blocks in 111 border districts in 18 states and union territories. This scheme extends to development projects within 10 km of the border. (Note: Development work in the area beyond 10 km is to start under BADP only after completion of the first 10 km.) Projects can include roads, bridges, health facilities, primary schools, irrigation, and sports facilities. In 2019–20, the scheme was allotted ₹825 crore (equivalent to ₹971 crore or US$100 million in 2023), while in 2020–21 it was allotted ₹784 crore (equivalent to ₹923 crore or US$96 million in 2023).

In 1997, BADP started in Arunachal Pradesh. It first applied to the Indo-Myanmar Border and in 1998 was extended to the Indo-China and Indo-Bhutan borders. Even after ten years, BADP was unable to provide development to the over 1500 villages in the border blocks of Arunachal Pradesh; "the border blocks are yet to be opened up and are in utter backwardness due to their isolation and inaccessibility". A NITI Aayog evaluation study for the period 2007–2011 and published in 2015 found that while the heads of Gram Panchayats (GPs) gave positive feedback related to BADP, and while people have benefitted in some ways, the requirement of border villages in Arunachal Pradesh were so great that they couldn't be met by BADP in one go:

...of the 21 GPs surveyed, only six were connected by all-weather roads; electricity was available in only seven of them; tap water was available only in five; none of the GPs surveyed had fixed line telephones. Only two of the 21 GPs had PDS shops; some villages were almost 25 km away from these shops. Several villages did not even have primary schools and anganwadi centres.

==== Arunachal border villages ====
Arunachal Pradesh has 455 villages under vibrant village scheme. Of these, 135 villages are designated as priority villages, because they are not yet connected by the roads. In January 2024, the central Ministry of Rural Development approved Rs 2,205 crores project to connect these 125 unconnected villages in Arunachal with 105 roads of total distance of 1,022 km. Detailed Project Reports (DPR) are being prepared for these 105 road. Remaining 10 villages are not being considered presently because of issues related to the land acquisition.

Indo-China border in Arunachal Pradesh, status in 2009 (border blocks, villages in the block and population)
District	Block	No of Villages	Pop (2001 census)
Tawang	Tawang	37	12949
Tawang	Kitpi	47	4853
West Kameng	Nafra	29	13644
East Kameng	Bameng	69	9244
East Kameng	Chayngtajo	68	10881
Kurung Kumey	Huri-Damin	32	2957
Kurung Kumey	Pipsorang	32	2206
Kurung Kumey	Sarli	36	1951
Kurung Kumey	Koloriang	52	4798
Kurung Kumey	Parsi-Parlo	43	3226
Upper Subansiri	Nacho	65	5249
Upper Subansiri	Siyum	48	4080
West Siang	Mechuka	45	6244
West Siang	Monigong	34	3025
West Siang	Kaying-Payum	25	5543
Upper Siang	Tuting	16	5874
Upper Siang	Singa-Gelling	18	1692
Lower Dibang Valley	Hunli	41	3114
Dibang Valley	Anini-Mipi	38	4344
Dibang Valley	Etalin-Maliney	28	1575
Dibang Valley	Aneli-Arzoo	34	1353
Anjaw	Chaglagam	42	2412
Anjaw	Hayuliang	92	10262
Total		962	121476

=== Battlefield tourism ===
The Bharat Ranbhoomi Darshan is an initiative of the Indian Military which will boost border tourism, patriotism, local infrastructure and economy while reversing civilian outward migration from these remote locations, it entails 77 battleground war memorials in border area including the Longewala War Memorial, Sadhewala War Memorial, Tanot Mata, Siachen base camp, Kargil, Galwan, Pangong Tso, Rezang La, Doklam, Bum La, Cho La, Kibithu, etc.

== See also ==
- India-China Border Roads
