= List of military disasters =

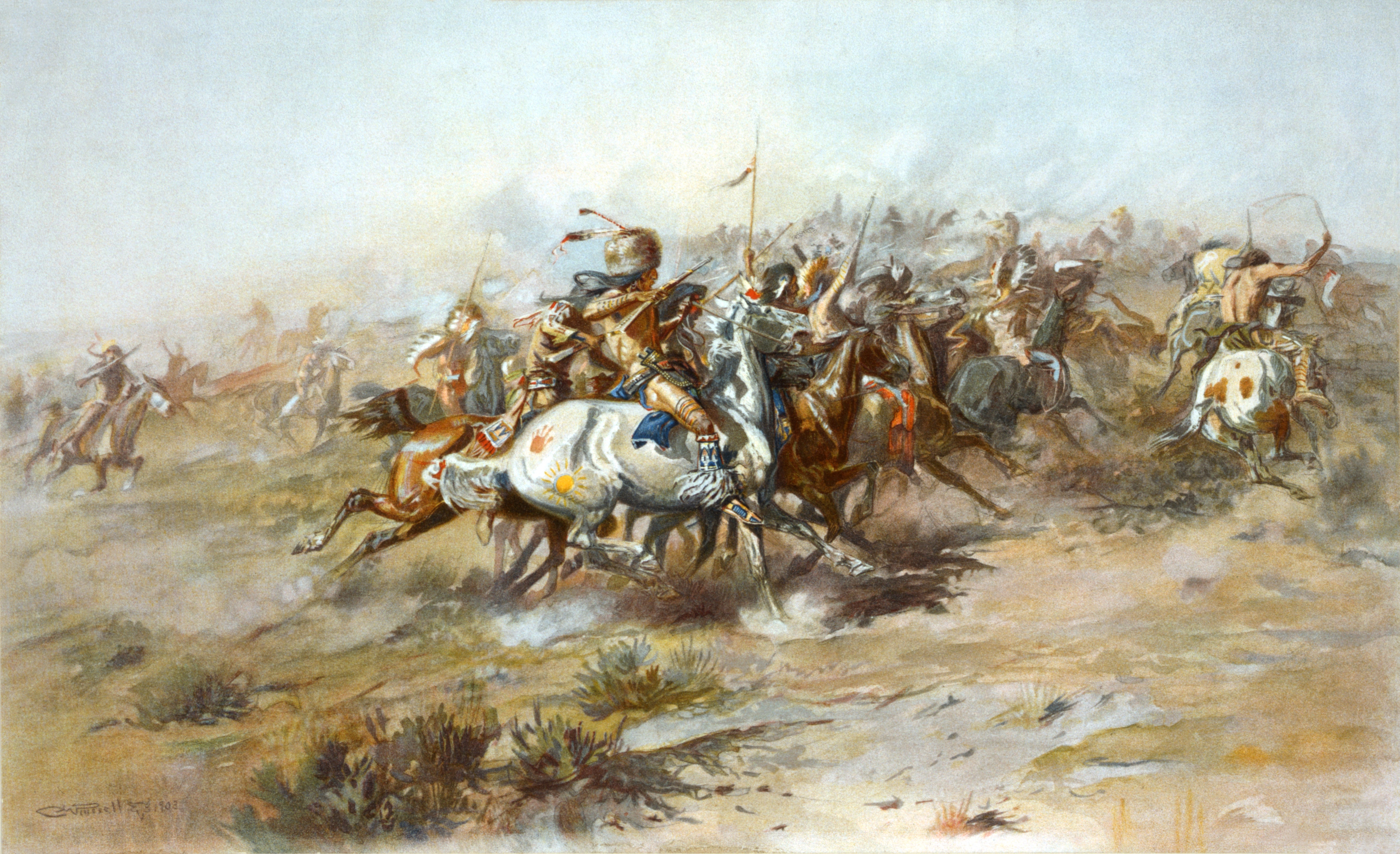
Battle of the Little Bighorn known as Custer's Last Stand.

A military disaster is the defeat of one side in a battle or war which results in the complete failure of the losing side to achieve their objectives, often with a high and disproportionate loss of life. The causes are varied and include human error, inferior technology, logistical problems, underestimating the enemy, being outnumbered, and bad luck.

Entries on this list are those where multiple sources dealing with the subject of military disasters have deemed the event in question to be a military disaster (or an equivalent term).

== Ancient era ==
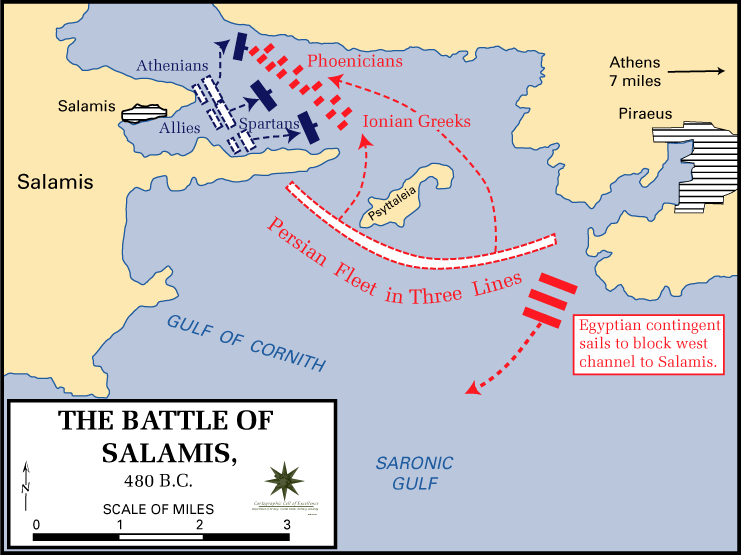

- Battle of Marathon (490 BC). A large Persian force was destroyed and routed by a smaller Athenian force.
- Battle of Salamis (480 BC). A huge Persian fleet was defeated by a united Greek force.
- Syracuse Expedition (415–413 BC). A large force from Athens failed to conquer the city of Syracuse, weakening the Athenian military position and depriving the city of much-needed manpower.
- Battle of Gaugamela (331 BC). Alexander the Great annihilated a much larger Persian army, thus ultimately conquering the Middle East.
- Battle of Cannae (216 BC). Hannibal destroyed the 16 Roman and Allied legions led by Lucius Aemilius Paullus and Gaius Terentius Varro. In all, perhaps more than 80 percent of the entire Roman army was dead or captured (including Paullus himself).
- Battle of Zama (202 BC). A Roman army of 34,000 under Scipio Africanus annihilated the Carthaginian army of 50,000 under Hannibal, thus bringing an end to the Second Punic War.
- Battle of Carrhae (53 BC). Crassus with 40,000 soldiers marched into Parthia, expecting to be victorious, chose to march a direct route through the desert instead of the mountains of the north. He and his army were entirely annihilated by 9,000 Parthian soldiers.
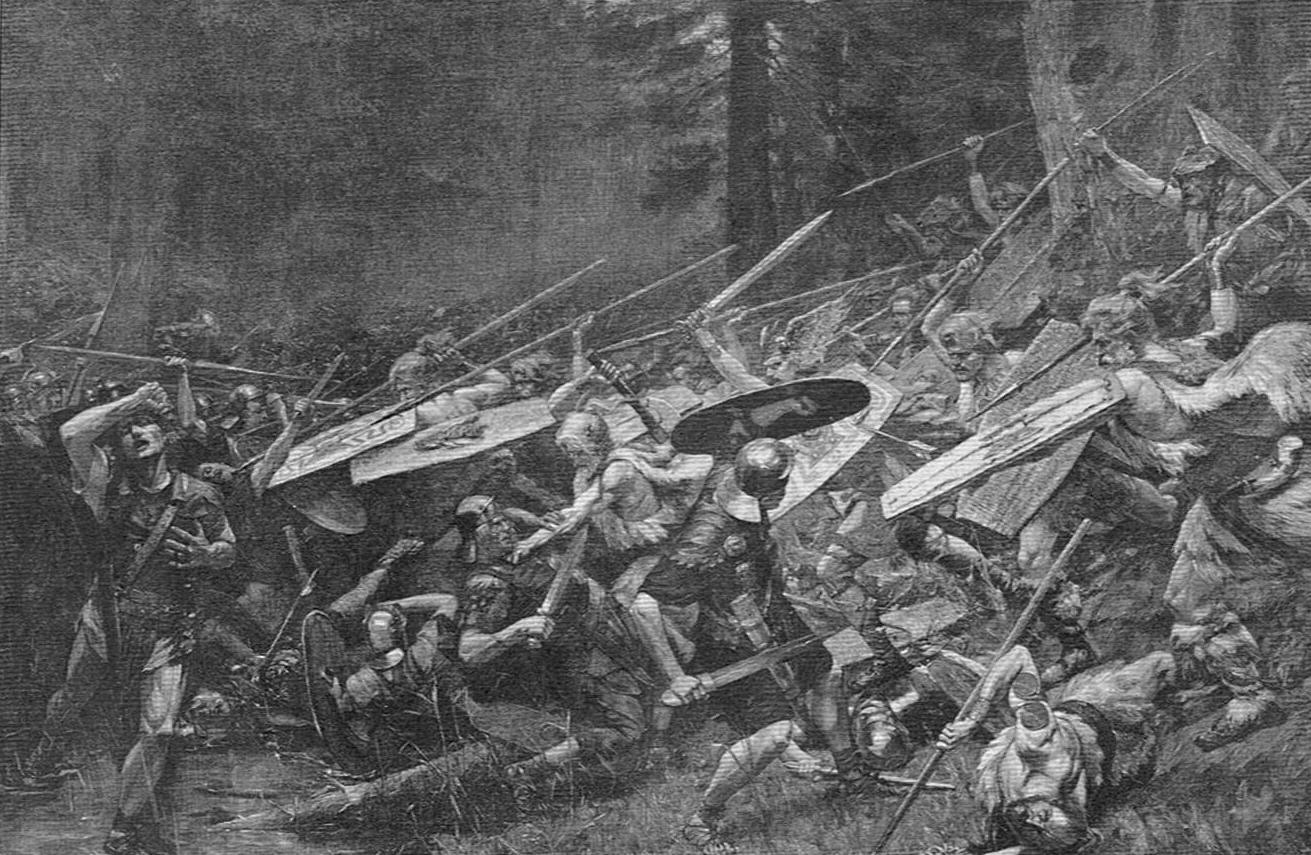
  Battle of the Teutoburg Forest
- Battle of the Teutoburg Forest (9 AD). Germanic warriors ambushed and destroyed three Roman legions.
- Battle of Adrianople (378 AD). The Emperor Valens was killed while Gothic heavy cavalry ambushed and decimated his Roman heavy infantry.

== Medieval era ==
- Battle of Tours (732). The Muslim Moors marched into southern France meeting no foes, until encountering the Christian Frankish forces led by Charles Martel at Tours. Despite the Moorish advantage over the Franks militarily, they were defeated decisively by the Franks.
- Battle of Hattin (1187). Overconfident Crusader forces from Jerusalem became trapped in a waterless desert area, and thus became easy prey for the Muslim forces of Salah-ud-din (Saladin)
- Battle of Agincourt (1415). A large French army with a large contingent of knights was defeated by Henry V's much smaller army.

== 16th century ==
- Battle of Flodden Field (1513). A Scottish invasion of England was defeated, resulting in the death of the popular King James IV of Scotland, as well as most of Scotland's nobles.

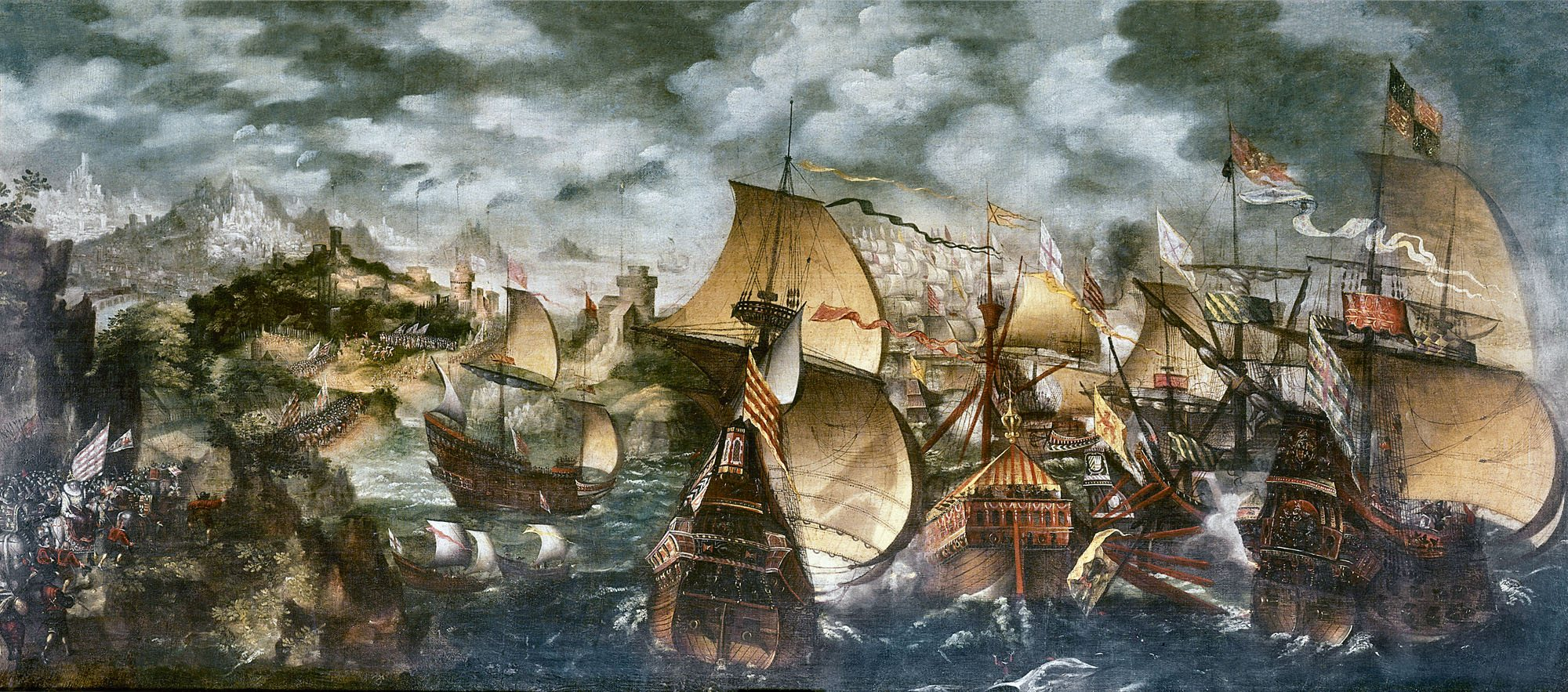
The fall of Spanish Armada in 1588

- Spanish Armada (1588). An English fleet sent fire ships into the Spanish invasion fleet, destroying some and scattering the rest, effectively ending the invasion threat. The Armada would later run into storms, and almost half the ships never returned to Spain, as well as more than half of the troops.

== 18th century ==
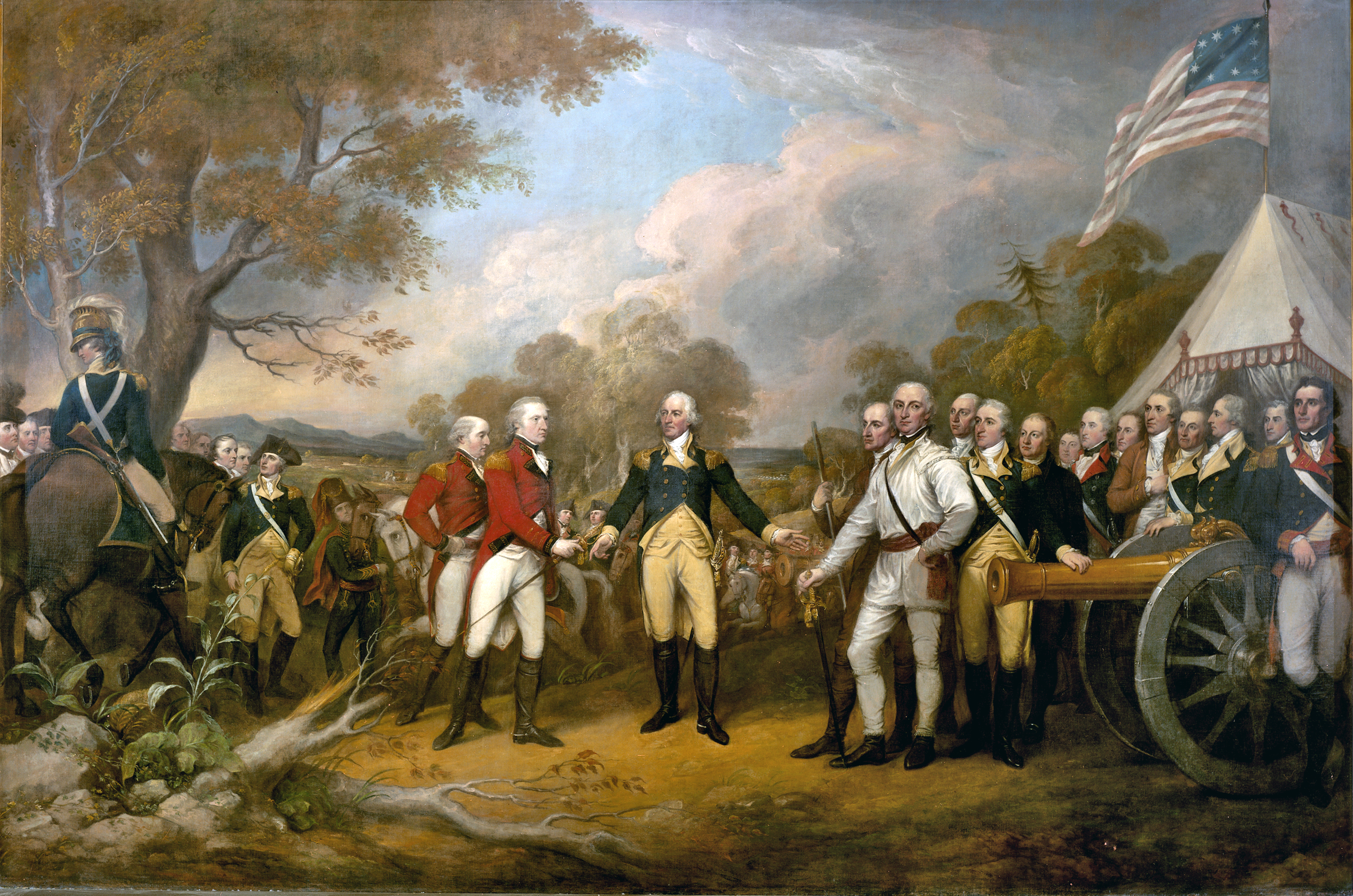
Surrender of General Burgoyne; this painting hangs in the United States Capitol Rotunda

- Battles of Saratoga (September–October 1777). John Burgoyne's British Army was captured after the battle by the Continental Army under Horatio Gates.

== 19th century ==
- Charge of the Light Brigade (1854). A British cavalry unit charged an active enemy artillery position due to miscommunication and suffered heavy casualties for no real advantage.
- Battle of Fredericksburg (1862). One-sided battle in which the Union Army advanced on entrenched Confederate Army units resulted in very high casualties during the American Civil War.
- Battle of the Little Bighorn (June 1876). Montana Territory. Lieutenant Colonel George Custer attacked a superior force of armed Lakota Sioux warriors. He was killed and five of the twelve companies of 7th Cavalry Regiment were annihilated. 268 U.S. troopers were killed and 55 were wounded.
- Battle of Isandlwana (January 22, 1879). In the first major battle of the Anglo-Zulu War, a Zulu impi overwhelmed and defeated two battalions armed with modern rifles and artillery. The battle was a major victory for the Zulus during the opening stages of the war.

== 20th century ==
- Battle of Tsushima (1905) During the Russo-Japanese War, the bulk of the Russian Baltic Fleet, under Admiral Zinovy Rozhestvensky, sailed over halfway around the world (18,000 nautical miles (33,000 km)) in order to relieve the blockade by Japan of the Russian Far East Fleet at Port Arthur, but was mostly sunk, scuttled, or surrendered in action against an Imperial Japanese Navy fleet under Admiral Tōgō Heihachirō, which took minimal losses.

=== First World War ===
- Gallipoli campaign (April 1915 to January 1916). A combined British, Commonwealth and French attempt to capture Istanbul became a stalemate on the Gallipoli Peninsula and was abandoned with 300,000 casualties.

=== Second World War ===
- Fall of Singapore (February 1942). It was the largest surrender of Commonwealth troops in history and destroyed the linchpin of the American-British-Dutch-Australian Command. Although the Japanese invasion force was half of the size of the defending force, Japanese air attacks on the city and lack of water proved decisive. Prime Minister Winston Churchill considered it to be the worst defeat in British military history, and it has been credited for undermining British prestige in Southeast Asia.
- Battle of Midway (June 1942). One of the turning points of World War II (Pacific Theatre). Admiral Isoroku Yamamoto of the Imperial Japanese Navy planned to invade the American navy base at Midway Island. U.S. Navy intelligence had broken Japan's main naval code and anticipated the attack. Japan lost four fleet carriers in three days, due to ill timing of fuelling and arming of aircraft, American fortitude and good fortune, cryptographic intelligence intercepts of Japanese signals, and, ultimately, poor planning by Yamamoto.
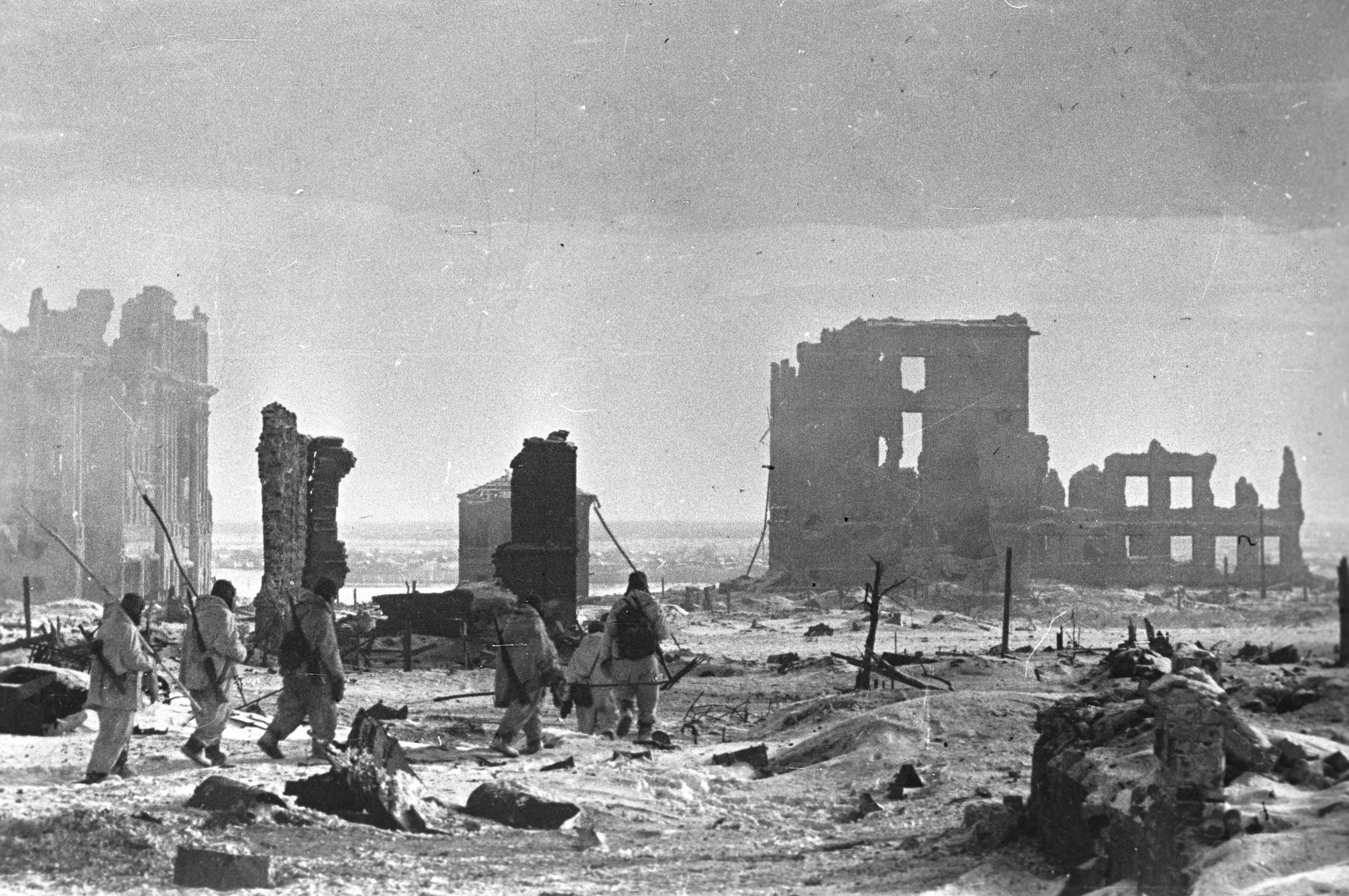
  Center of Stalingrad after liberation in 1943
- Battle of Stalingrad (winter of 1942–43). One of the turning points of World War II (European Theater). German field marshal Friedrich Paulus failed to keep a mobile strategic reserve and the Sixth Army was surrounded by a rapid Soviet flanking attack. Rubble caused by German bombing and artillery fire left their tanks unable to enter the city. The 250,000+ German troops in Stalingrad surrendered despite Adolf Hitler’s promise that they would never leave the city.

=== Cold War era ===
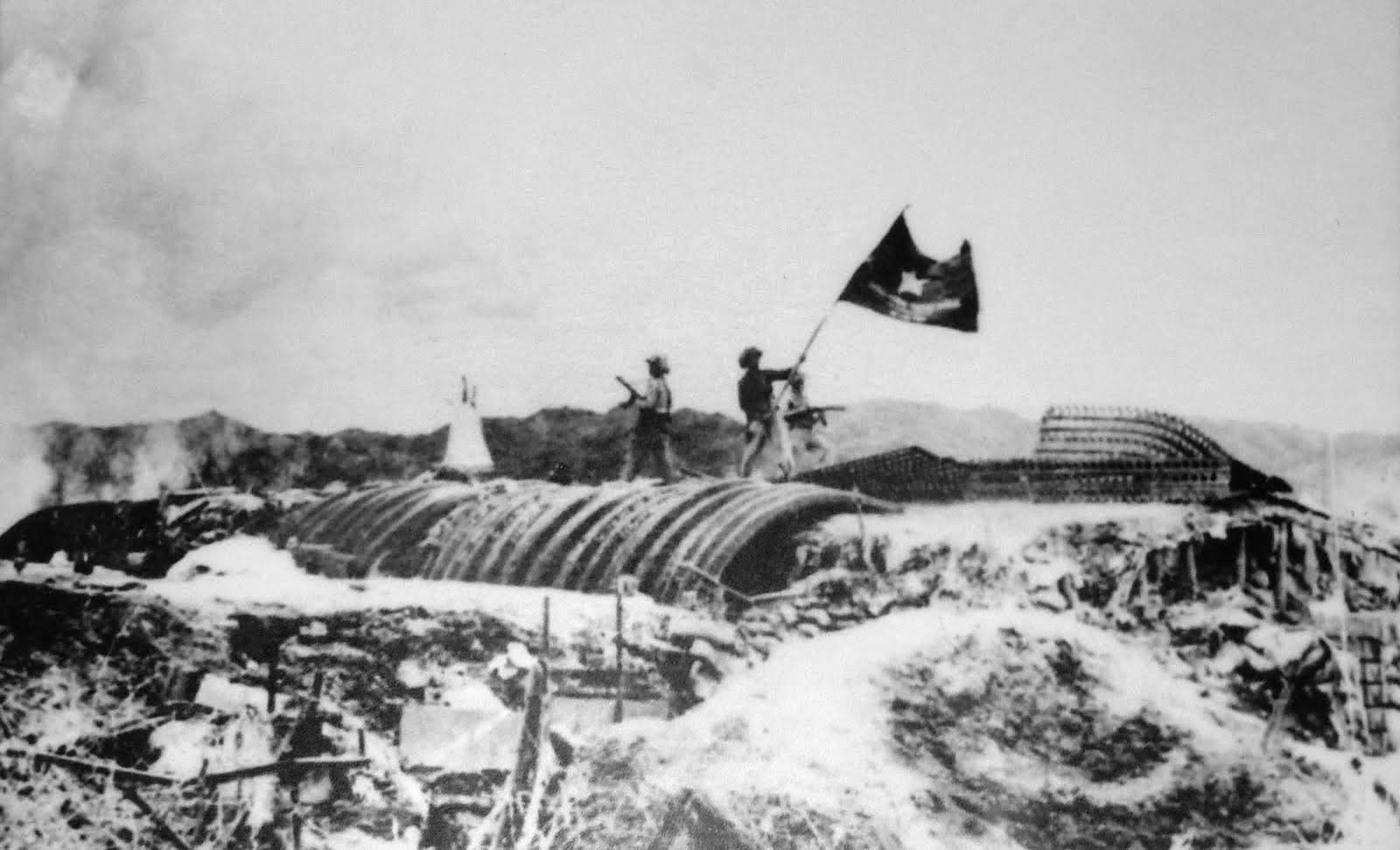
Viet Minh troops plant their flag over the captured French headquarters at Dien Bien Phu

- Battle of Dien Bien Phu (1954). The French Far East Expeditionary Corps advanced deep into northwestern Vietnam near Điện Biên Phủ to cut off the Viet Minh's supply lines from Laos and force it into a confrontation. The Viet Minh besieged the French and smuggled heavy artillery through mountain terrain, preventing resupply by air with anti-aircraft guns. The defeat forced the French Armed Forces to withdraw from North Vietnam in 1954.

== See also ==
- Pyrrhic victory
- Friendly fire
- Last stand
