= Longewala =

- border town
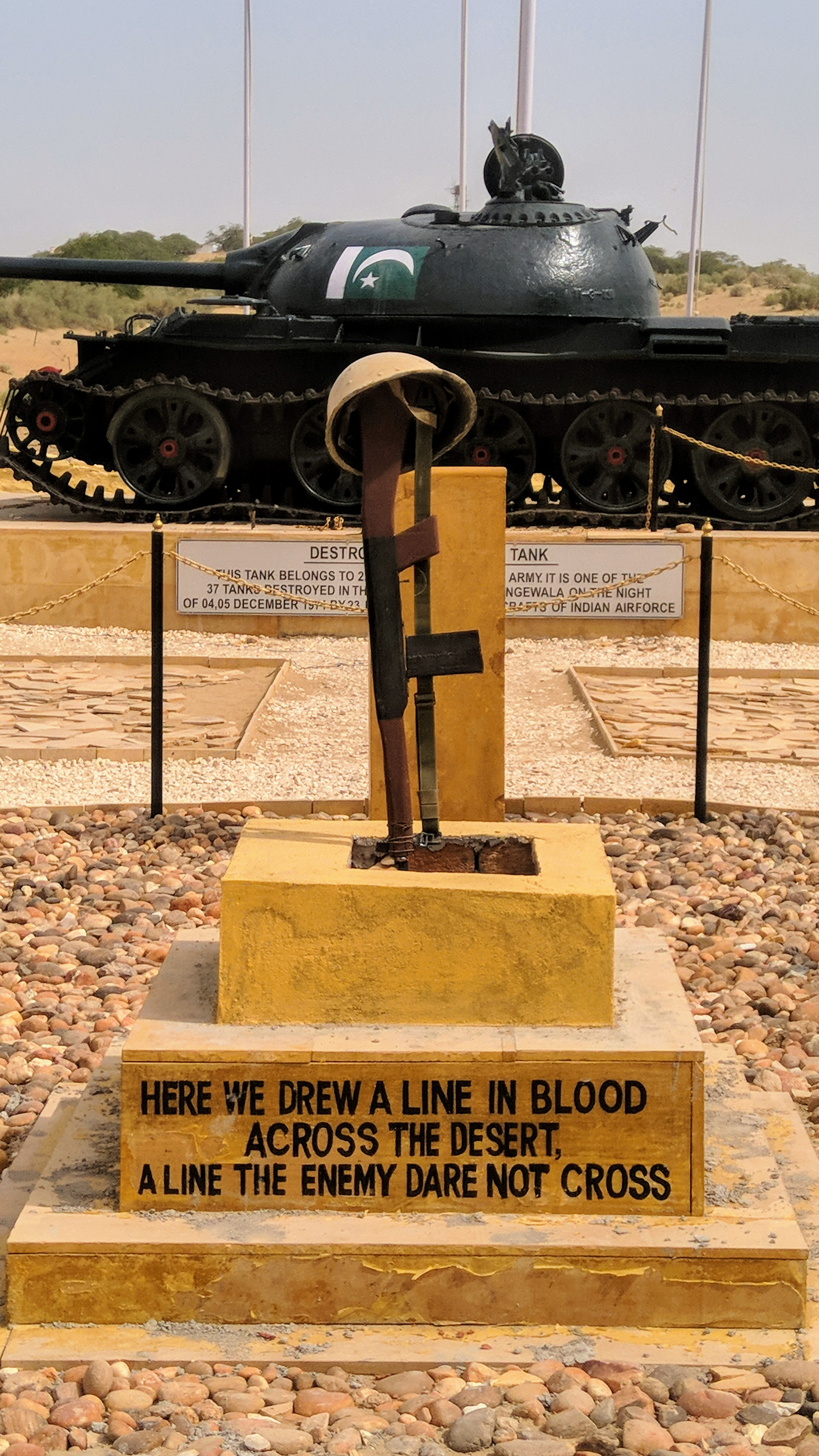
- Longewala War Museum in Jaisalmer district, Rajasthan, India

- Location in Rajasthan, India Longewala (India)
- Coordinates: 27°31′23″N 70°9′16″E
- Country: India
- State: Rajasthan
- District: Jaisalmer

Languages
  - Official: Hindi, Rajasthani
- Time zone: UTC+5:30 (IST)

Longewala is a border town in the Indian state of Rajasthan. It is located in the Thar Desert in the western part of Jaisalmer district, about 111 km from the city of Jaisalmer. Main languages widely spoken in the town are Rajasthani and Hindi. Longewala has a total population of 188 people according to the 2011 census.

== See also ==
- List of military disasters
- Battle of Longewala
- India-Pakistan Border Ceremonies
- Hindumalkote
- Tanot
