= Sunny Deol filmography =

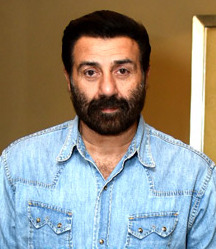
Deol in 2019

Indian actor Sunny Deol debuted in his father's production Betaab (1983) directed by Rahul Rawail, which was a commercial success. It was followed by numerous roles in some other films of that decade including Sohni Mahiwal (1984), Arjun (1985) and Paap Ki Duniya (1988). In 1989, his role as a police officer in Tridev was highlighted and he also appeared in ChaalBaaz; both were among the top 5 highest earning films of the year.

Sunny Deol appeared in the lead role of a boxer in another of his father's productions Ghayal, directed by debutante Rajkumar Santoshi, which became the year's second top-grossing film. It established and won him the Filmfare Award for Best Actor and National Film Special Jury Award. In 1993, Deol reunited with Santoshi to play an alcoholic lawyer in the highly successful social drama Damini and was awarded the Filmfare Award and National Film Award for Best Supporting Actor. That year, his character of a lieutenant army officer in Yash Chopra's psychological thriller Darr earned him a Filmfare Award for Best Actor nomination. In 1996 he appeared as a criminal in Raj Kanwar's action film Jeet. He also worked with Santoshi a third time in Ghatak. In 1997, he starred in an all-time-blockbuster epic war film Border, where he played the role of a war hero. Two years later, he produced and directed his brother's starrer Dillagi (1999), in which he had a lead role too, but the film failed to gain success.

In 2001, Deol featured as a Sikh truck driver who loves a Muslim woman in Anil Sharma's patriotic action drama portraying the India-Pakistan partition of 1947, Gadar: Ek Prem Katha, opposite Amisha Patel. The film became the highest-grossing Hindi film up until then in mainstream cinema earning over ₹1.3 billion (US$14 million) worldwide and he was nominated for Filmfare Award for Best Actor once again. In the same year, he worked in another highly successful action thriller film Indian (2001). He went on to appear in several films co-starring his father and brother, such as Apne (2007) and the Yamla Pagla Deewana film series (2011–18). In 2016, Deol directed and starred in a sequel to Ghayal. He launched and directed his elder son as an actor in the romantic thriller Pal Pal Dil Ke Paas (2019).

Sunny Deol has experienced a massive career resurgence in recent years, headlining two of the highest-grossing blockbuster films in Indian cinema history. Following the record-breaking success of Gadar 2 in 2023, he returned to the war genre with the 2026 blockbuster Border 2, further cementing his legacy as a dominant force at the box office.

== Films ==
Year	Title	Role	Notes	Ref.
1983	Betaab	Sunny Kapoor		
1984	Sohni Mahiwal	Mahiwal / Mirza Izzat Beg		
1984	Sunny	Sunny Inderjit		
1984	Manzil Manzil	Vijay (Sonu)		
1985	Arjun	Arjun Malvankar		
1985	Zabardast	Sunder Kumar / Shyam		
1986	Sultanat	Sultan		
1986	Saveray Wali Gaadi	Ravi Das		
1986	Samundar	Ajit		
1987	Dacait	Arjun Yadav		
1988	Paap Ki Duniya	Suraj / Ashok		
1988	Ram-Avtar	Ram		
1988	Yateem	Krishna		
1988	Inteqam	Birju / Vijay (Note: Deol played a character with two different names)		
1989	Vardi	Ajay Singh		
1989	Joshilaay	Dara		
1989	Tridev	Inspector Karan Saxena		
1989	ChaalBaaz	Suraj		
1989	Nigahen: Nagina Part II	Anand		
1989	Aag Ka Gola	Vikram Singh / Shankar (Shaka)		
1989	Main Tera Dushman	Gopal	Cameo appearance	
1990	Majboor	Sunil		
1990	Kroadh	Ajay Shukla (Ajju)		
1990	Ghayal	Ajay Mehra		
1990	Badnam	Darshan	Bengali film; Cameo appearance	
1991	Vishnu-Devaa	Vishnu Prasad / Vishnu Subramaniam / Jack D'Souza		
1991	Yodha	Karan Srivastav		
1991	Shankara	Shankara		
1991	Narsimha	Narsimha		
1992	Vishwatma	Prabhat Singh		
1993	Lootere	Karan Chopra		
1993	Kshatriya	Vinay Pratap Singh		
1993	Damini	Advocate Govind Srivastava		
1993	Izzat Ki Roti	Jeet		
1993	Veerta	Mangal Singh		
1993	Gunaah	Ravi Soni		
1993	Darr	Sunil Malhotra		
1994	Insaniyat	Karim Lala		
1994	Imtihaan	Raja		
1995	Dushmani: A Violent Love Story	Suraj Singh		
1995	Angrakshak	Ajay		
1996	Himmat	Ajay Saxena		
1996	Jeet	Karan		
1996	Ghatak	Kashi Nath		
1996	Ajay	Ajay		
1997	Ziddi	Deva Pradhan		
1997	Border	Major Kuldip Singh Chandpuri, MVC, VSM		
1997	Aur Pyaar Ho Gaya	Himself	Cameo appearance	
1997	Qahar	Raja		
1998	Zor	Arjun Singh		
1998	Salaakhen	Vishal Agnihotri		
1998	Iski Topi Uske Sarr	Bhangra Dancer	Cameo appearance	
1999	Pyaar Koi Khel Nahin	Anand		
1999	Arjun Pandit	Prof. Arjun Dixit (Arjun Pandit)		
1999	Dillagi	Ranvir Singh	Also director; Directorial debut	
2000	Champion	Rajveer Singh		
2001	Farz	DCP Karan Singh		
2001	Gadar: Ek Prem Katha	Tara Singh		
2001	Yeh Raaste Hain Pyaar Ke	Sagar	Cameo appearance	
2001	Indian	DCP Rajshekhar Azad		
2001	Kasam	Shankar		
2002	Maa Tujhhe Salaam	Major Pratap Singh		
2002	23rd March 1931: Shaheed	Chandra Shekhar Azad		
2002	Jaani Dushman: Ek Anokhi Kahani	Karan Saxena		
2002	Karz: The Burden of Truth	Suraj Singh		
2003	The Hero: Love Story of a Spy	Major Arun Khanna / Ajay Chakravarty (alias name) / Major Ravi Batra (alias name) / Wahid Khan (alias name) (Note: Deol plays an undercover spy using different names.)		
2003	Kaise Kahoon Ke... Pyaar Hai	Arjun Singh	Cameo appearance	
2003	Jaal: The Trap	Ajay Kaul		
2003	Khel – No Ordinary Game	ACP Rajveer Scindia		
2004	Lakeer – Forbidden Lines	Arjun Rana		
2004	Rok Sako To Rok Lo	Kabir (Phantom) Mukherjee		
2005	Jo Bole So Nihaal	Nihaal Singh		
2006	Naksha	Veer K. Malhotra		
2006	Teesri Aankh: The Hidden Camera	ACP Arjun Singh		
2007	Big Brother	Devdhar Gandhi (Deva) / Devdhar Sharma		
2007	Fool & Final	Munna		
2007	Apne	Angad Singh Choudhary		
2007	Kaafila	Colonel Sameer Ahmed Khan		
2008	Tolly Lights	Himself	Cameo appearance	
2008	Heroes	Squadron Leader Vikram Shergill		
2009	Fox	Yashwant Deshmukh / "Fox"		
2010	Right Yaaa Wrong	Ajay Shridhar		
2010	Khuda Kasam	Hussain		
2010	Hello Darling	Nikhil Bajaj	Cameo appearance	
2011	Yamla Pagla Deewana	Paramveer Singh Dhillon		
2013	Yamla Pagla Deewana 2	Paramveer Singh Dhillon		
2013	Singh Saab the Great	Saranjit Singh Talwar / Singh Saab		
2013	Mahabharat	Bhima	Voiceover	
2014	Dishkiyaoon	Lakwa		
2015	I Love NY	Randhir Singh		
2016	Ghayal Once Again	Ajay Mehra	Also director	
2017	Poster Boys	Jagaavar Chaudhry		
2018	Yamla Pagla Deewana: Phir Se	Puran Singh		
2018	Mohalla Assi	Dharamnath Pandey		
2018	Bhaiaji Superhit	Lal Bhaisahab Dubey		
2019	Blank	SS Dewan		
2019	Pal Pal Dil Ke Paas	—N/a	Director	
2022	Chup: Revenge of the Artist	IGP Arvind Mathur		
2023	Gadar 2	Tara Singh		
2025	Jaat	Brig. Baldev Pratap Singh / Jaat		
2026	Border 2	Lt Col Fateh Singh Kaler		
2026	Ikka	Arjun Mehra / Ikka	Netflix film	
2026	Batwara 1947	Sikander Mirza		
2026	Ramayana: Part 1	Hanuman	Cameo appearance	
2026	Gabru †	TBA	Post-production	
2026	Suryaa: Ant Se Aarambh Tak †	TBA	Filming	
2028	Ramayana: Part 2 †	Hanuman	Filming	

== Television ==
Year	Title	Role	Notes	Ref.
2023	The Romantics	Himself	Documentary	

== See also ==
- List of awards and nominations received by Sunny Deol
