= List of awards and nominations received by Sunny Deol =

Sunny Deol awards and nominations
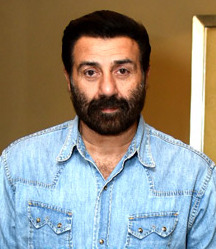
- Deol in 2019
Awards and nominations
Award	Wins	Nominations
National Film Awards	2	0
Filmfare Awards	2	8
IIFA Awards	0	1
Lions Gold Awards	2	0
Star Screen Awards	1	1
Zee Cine Awards	2	4
Other awards	3	10

Totals (Note: Certain award groups do not simply award one winner. They acknowledge several different recipients, have runners-up, and have third place. Since this is a specific recognition and is different from losing an award, runner-up mentions are considered wins in this award tally. For simplification and to avoid errors, each award in this list has been presumed to have had a prior nomination.)
- Wins: 13
- Nominations: 22

Ajay Singh Deol (born 19 October 1957), professionally known as Sunny Deol, is an Indian film actor, director and producer known for his work in Hindi cinema. In a film career spanning over thirty five years and over hundred films, Deol has won many awards, including two National Film Awards, two Filmfare Awards, two Zee Cine Awards and one Screen Award.

Deol made his debut opposite fellow debutante Amrita Singh in Betaab (1983). He received a Filmfare Award for Best Actor nomination for his performance. Subsequently, he went on to star in numerous successful films in the 1980s and 1990s. He made his debut as a director and producer with Dillagi, in which he starred alongside his brother Bobby. His critically recognized work includes Manzil Manzil (1984), Arjun (1985), Saveray Wali Gaadi and Sultanat (1986), Dacait (1987), Yateem and Paap Ki Duniya (1988),Tridev and ChaalBaaz (1989), Narsimha (1991),Vishwatma (1992),Veerta and Darr (1993), Imtihaan (1994), Jeet and Ghatak (1996), Ziddi and Border (1997), Salaakhen (1998), Arjun Pandit (1999) and Farz and Indian (2001).

With his portrayal of an amateur boxer wrongly accused of his brother's murder in Rajkumar Santoshi's critically and commercially successful Ghayal in 1990, Deol gained wide recognition and praise. The film went on to win seven Filmfare Awards and his performance won him the National Film Award – Special Jury Award / Special Mention (Feature Film) and the Filmfare Award for Best Actor. His portrayal of a lawyer in the film Damini – Lightning (1993) fetched him several accolades including the National Film Award for Best Supporting Actor and the Filmfare Award for Best Supporting Actor. Anil Sharma's Gadar: Ek Prem Katha (2001), in which Deol portrayed a lorry driver who falls in love with a Muslim girl, was the highest-grossing Bollywood film ever at the time of its release, and garnered him another Filmfare Award for Best Actor nomination. Deol's successful films include The Hero: Love Story of a Spy (2003), Apne (2007), Yamla Pagla Deewana (2011) and Ghayal Once Again (2016). These accomplishments have established him as a leading actor of the Hindi film industry.

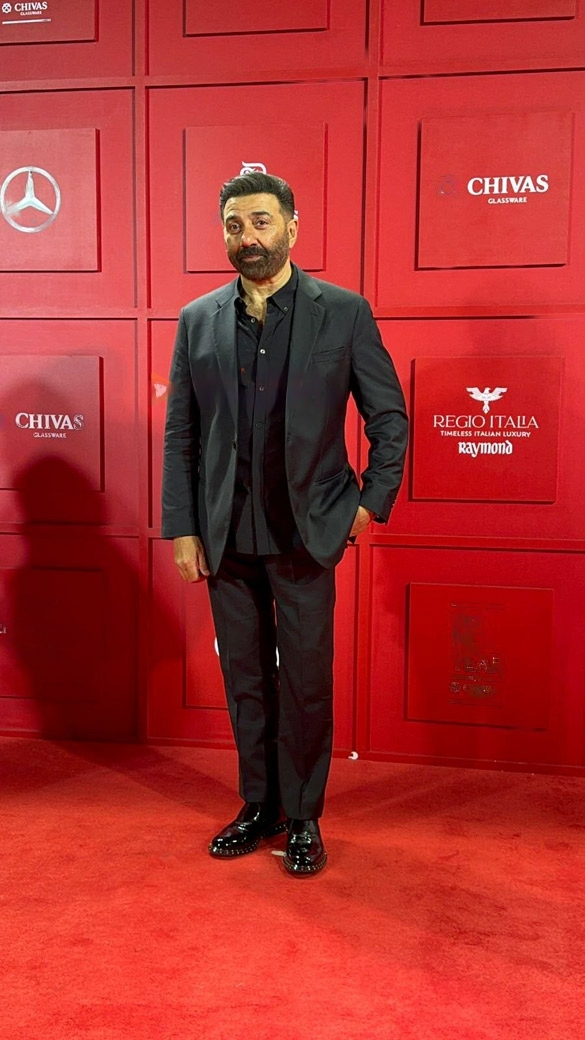
Deol at GQ Men of the Year Awards in 2023.

== National Film Awards ==
Year	Category	Film	Result	Ref(s).
1991	Special Jury Award	Ghayal	Won	
1994	Best Supporting Actor	Damini	Won	

== Filmfare Awards ==
Year	Category	Film	Result	Ref(s).
1984	Best Actor	Betaab	Nominated	
1991	Best Actor	Ghayal	Won	
1994	Best Supporting Actor	Damini	Won	
1997	Best Actor	Ghatak	Nominated	
1998	Best Actor	Border	Nominated	
2002	Best Actor	Gadar: Ek Prem Katha	Nominated	
2024	Best Actor	Gadar 2	Nominated	

== IIFA Awards ==
Year	Category	Film	Result	Ref(s).
2002	Best Actor	Gadar: Ek Prem Katha	Nominated	
2024	Best Actor	Gadar 2	Nominated	

== Sansui Viewers' Choice Movie Awards ==
Year	Category	Film	Result	Ref(s).
2002	Best Actor	Gadar: Ek Prem Katha	Won	

== Screen Awards ==
Year	Category	Film	Result	Ref(s).
1996	Best Actor	Jeet	Nominated	
2002	Best Actor	Gadar: Ek Prem Katha	Won	
2002	Jodi No.1 (shared with Ameesha Patel)	Gadar: Ek Prem Katha	Nominated	

== Zee Cine Awards ==
Year	Category	Film	Result	Ref(s).
1998	Best Actor – Male	Border	Nominated	
2002	Best Actor – Male	Gadar: Ek Prem Katha	Nominated	
2002	Outstanding Performance – Male	Gadar: Ek Prem Katha	Won	
2024	Best Actor (Viewer's Choice)	Gadar 2	Won	
2024	Best Actor (Jury's Choice)	Gadar 2	Nominated	

== Bollywood Movie Awards ==
Year	Category	Film	Result	Ref(s).
2002	Best Actor	Gadar: Ek Prem Katha	Nominated	

== Stardust Awards ==
Year	Category	Film	Result	Ref(s).
2012	Best Actor in a Comedy or Romance	Yamla Pagla Deewana	Nominated	

== CNN-IBN Indian of the Year ==
Year	Category	Result	Ref(s).
2023	Indian of the Year (Entertainment)	Nominated	

== Pinkvilla Style Icons Awards ==
Year	Category	Film	Result	Ref(s).
2024	Best Actor – Male	Gadar 2	Nominated	

== NDTV Indian of the Year ==
Year	Category	Film	Result	Ref(s).
2024	Entertainer of the Year	Gadar 2	Won	

== Lions Gold Awards ==
Year	Category	Film	Result	Ref(s).
2022	Male Action Star of the Year	Chup	Won	

== GQ Men of the Year Awards ==
Year	Category	Result	Ref(s).
2023	GQ India Man of the Year	Won	
