= 42nd Filmfare Awards =

1997 awards for Hindi cinema

- Date: 23 February 1997
- Site: Mumbai, India

Highlights
- Best Film: Raja Hindustani
- Critics Award for Best Film: Khamoshi: The Musical
- Most awards: Khamoshi: The Musical and Raja Hindustani (5)
- Most nominations: Khamoshi: The Musical (13)

The 42nd Filmfare Awards for Hindi cinema films were held on 23 February 1997, in Mumbai, India.

Khamoshi: The Musical led the ceremony with 13 nominations, followed by Maachis and Raja Hindustani with 11 nominations each.

Khamoshi: The Musical and Raja Hindustani won 5 awards each, thus becoming the most-awarded films at the ceremony, with the former winning Best Film (Critics) (for Sanjay Leela Bhansali) and Best Actress (Critics) (for Manisha Koirala), and the latter winning Best Film, Best Actor (for Aamir Khan) and Best Actress (for Karisma Kapoor).

Nana Patekar received dual nominations for Best Actor for his performances in Agni Sakshi and Khamoshi: The Musical, but lost to Aamir Khan who won the award for Raja Hindustani.

Shekhar Kapur achieved special feat in the awards. His 1994 film Bandit Queen earlier was awarded the Filmfare Critics Award for Best Film in 1995. Surprisingly Kapur was awarded the Filmfare Award for Best Director in this ceremony for the latter. Thus, Kapur became the only person who was awarded two different awards for the same film in different ceremonies.

== Main awards ==
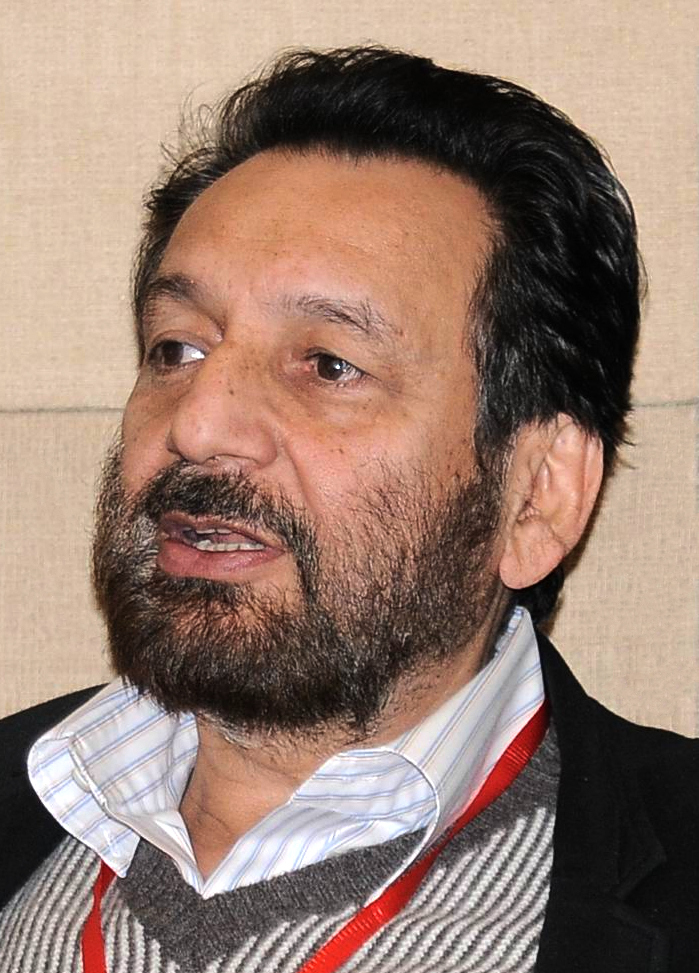
Shekhar Kapur — Best Director winner for Bandit Queen

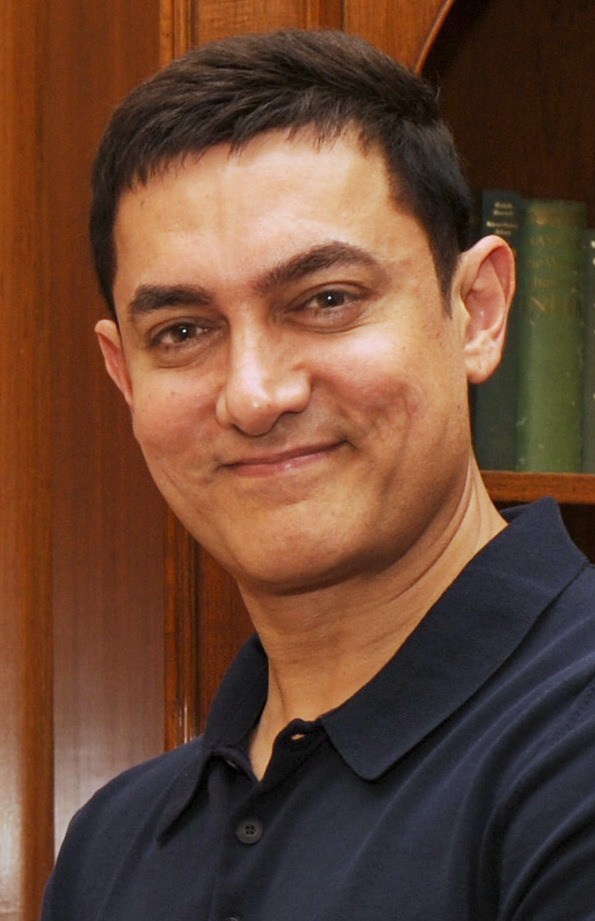
Aamir Khan — Best Actor winner for Raja Hindustani

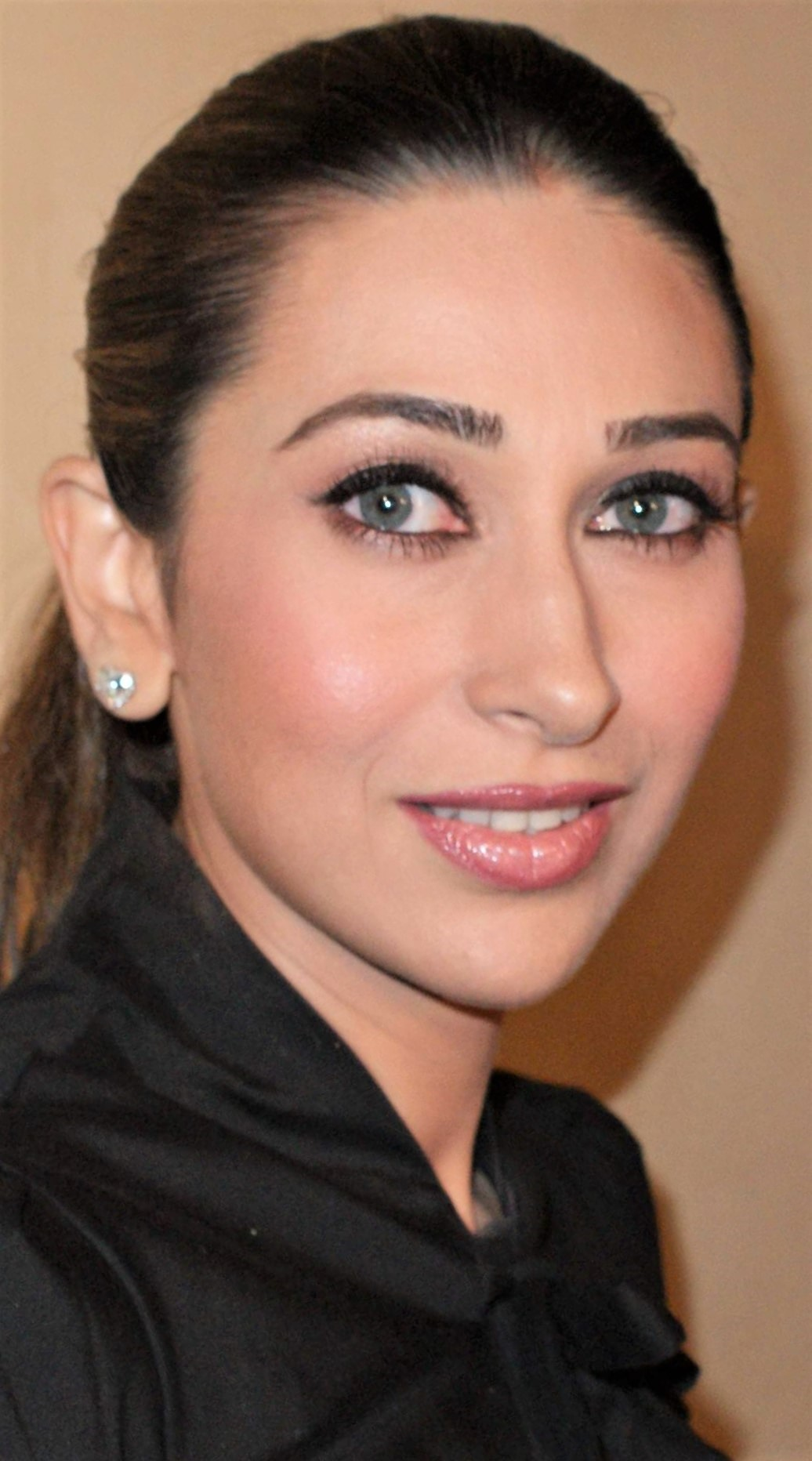
Karisma Kapoor — Best Actress winner for Raja Hindustani

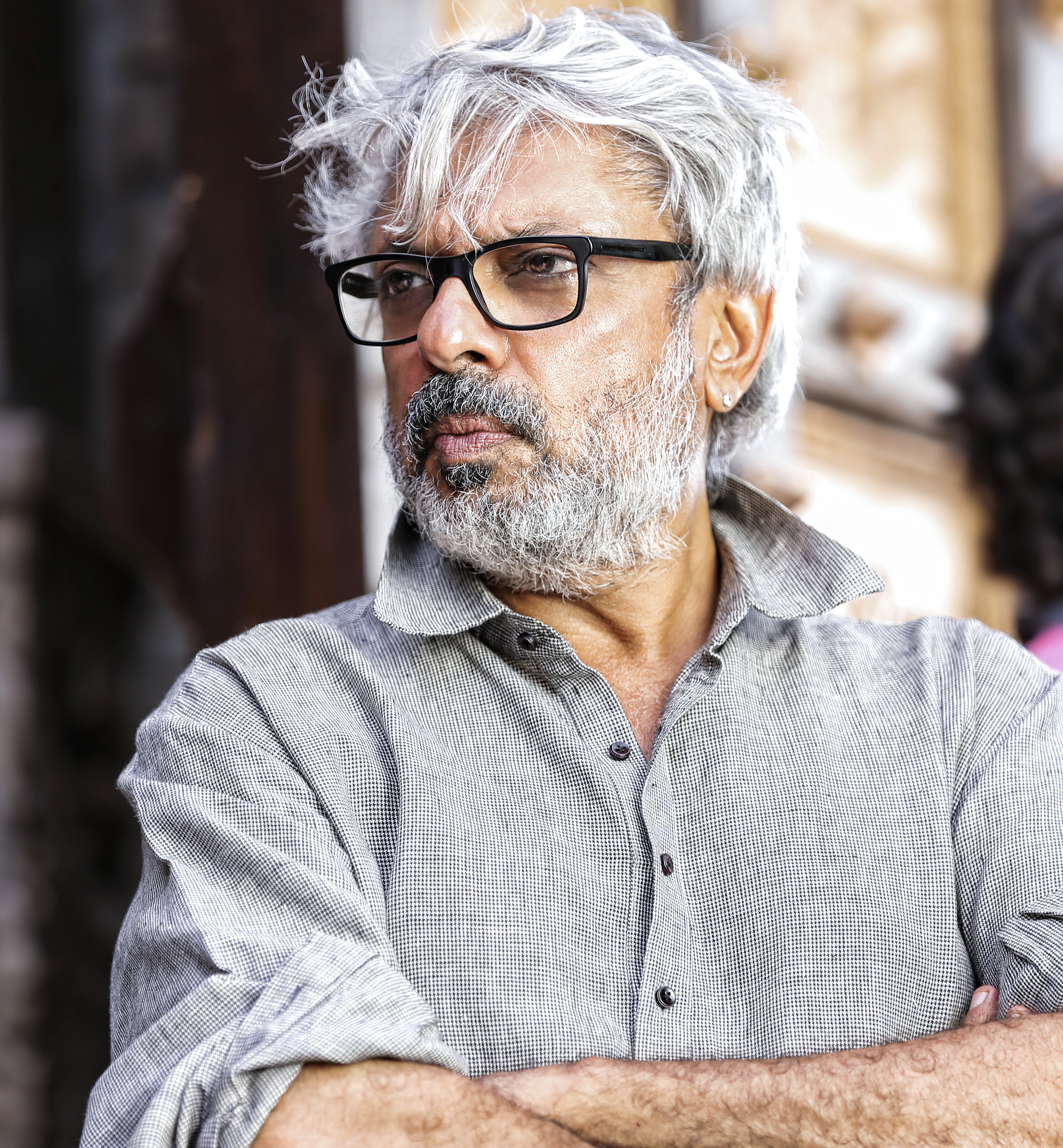
Sanjay Leela Bhansali — Best Director Critics winner for Khamoshi: The Musical

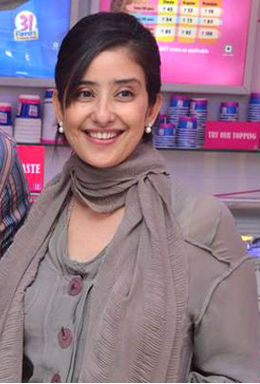
Manisha Koirala — Best Actress Critics winner for Khamoshi: The Musical

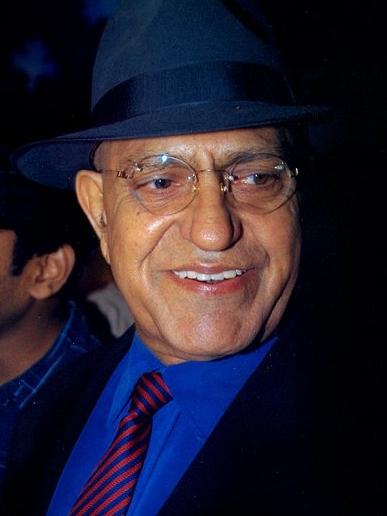
Amrish Puri — Best Supporting Actor winner for Ghatak: Lethal

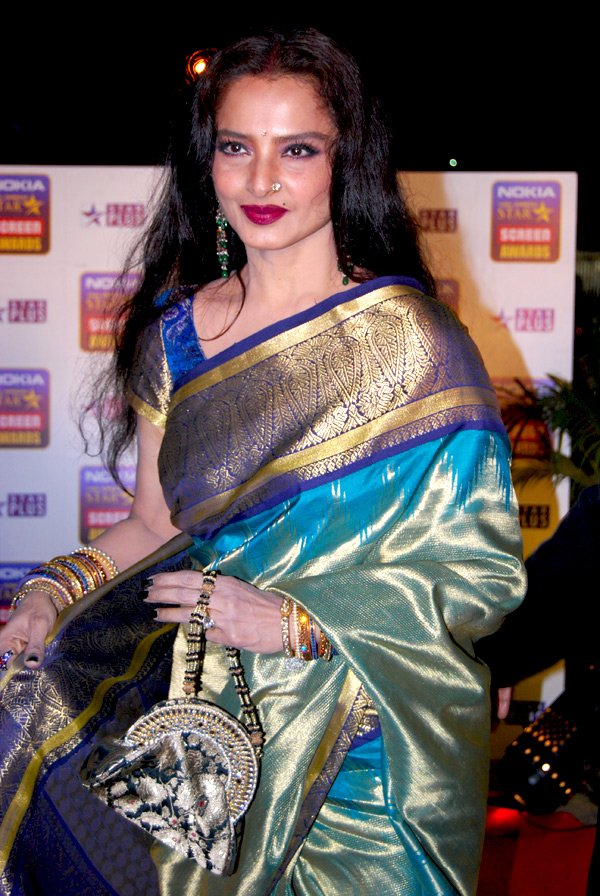
Rekha — Best Supporting Actress winner for Khiladiyon Ka Khiladi

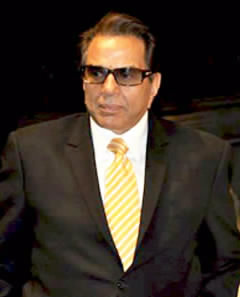
Dharmendra — Lifetime Achievement Awardee

The winners and nominees have been listed below. Winners are listed first, highlighted in boldface, and indicated with a double dagger (‡).

Best Film	Best Director
**Raja Hindustani**: Agni Sakshi; Bandit Queen; Khamoshi: The Musical; Maachis	**Shekhar Kapoor – Bandit Queen**: Dharmesh Darshan – Raja Hindustani; Gulzar – Maachis; Partho Ghosh – Agni Sakshi; Rajkumar Santoshi – Ghatak: Lethal
Best Actor	Best Actress
**Aamir Khan – Raja Hindustani**; Govinda – Saajan Chale Sasural; Nana Patekar – Agni Sakshi; Nana Patekar – Khamoshi: The Musical; Sunny Deol – Ghatak: Lethal	**Karisma Kapoor – Raja Hindustani**; Juhi Chawla – Daraar; Manisha Koirala – Khamoshi: The Musical; Seema Biswas – Bandit Queen; Tabu – Maachis
Best Supporting Actor	Best Supporting Actress
**Amrish Puri – Ghatak: Lethal**; Anupam Kher – Chaahat; Jackie Shroff – Agni Sakshi; Om Puri – Maachis; Salman Khan – Jeet	**Rekha – Khiladiyon Ka Khiladi**; Archana Puran Singh – Raja Hindustani; Helen – Khamoshi: The Musical; Seema Biswas – Khamoshi: The Musical; Tabu – Jeet
Best Performance in a Negative Role	Best Performance in a Comic Role
**Arbaaz Khan – Daraar**: Ashish Vidyarthi – Is Raat Ki Subah Nahin; Danny Denzongpa – Ghatak: Lethal; Milind Gunaji – Fareb; Naseeruddin Shah – Chaahat	**Satish Kaushik – Saajan Chale Sasural**: Johnny Lever – Raja Hindustani; Kader Khan – Saajan Chale Sasural; Navneet Nishan – Raja Hindustani; Shakti Kapoor – Loafer
Best Music Director	Best Lyricist
**Raja Hindustani – Nadeem-Shravan**: Khamoshi: The Musical – Jatin–Lalit; Maachis – Vishal Bhardwaj; Papa Kehte Hai – Rajesh Roshan; Tere Mere Sapne – Viju Shah	**Papa Kehte Hai – Javed Akhtar for Ghar Se Nikalte Hi**: Is Raat Ki Subah Nahin – Nida Fazli for Jeevan Kya Hai; Khamoshi: The Musical – Majrooh Sultanpuri for Aaj Main Upar; Maachis – Gulzar for Chappa Chappa; Raja Hindustani – Sameer for Pardesi Pardesi
Best Male Playback Singer	Best Female Playback Singer
**Raja Hindustani – Udit Narayan for Pardesi Pardesi**: Diljale – Udit Narayan for Ho Nahin Sakta; Fareb – Abhijeet for Yeh Teri Aankhen Jhuki Jhuki; Maachis – Hariharan and Suresh Wadkar for Chappa Chappa; Papa Kehte Hai – Udit Narayan for Ghar Se Nikalte Hi	**Khamoshi: The Musical – Kavita Krishnamurthy for Aaj Main Upar**: Agni Sakshi – Kavita Krishnamurthy for O Yaara Dil Lagana; Khamoshi: The Musical – Alka Yagnik for Baahon Ke Darmiyaan; Raja Hindustani – Alka Yagnik for Pardesi Pardesi

=== Technical Awards ===
Best Story	Best Screenplay
**Maachis – Gulzar**: Agni Sakshi – Ranbir Pushp	**Ghatak: Lethal – Rajkumar Santoshi**: Agni Sakshi – Ranbir Pushp
Best Dialogue	Best Action
**Maachis – Gulzar**	**Khiladiyon Ka Khiladi**
Best Background Score	Best Choreography
**Bandit Queen**	**Rakshak – Chinni Prakash for Sheher Ki Ladki**
Best Editing	Best Sound
**Ghatak: Lethal**	**Khamoshi: The Musical**
Best Art Direction
**Khamoshi: The Musical**

=== Special awards ===
Best Male Debut
- **Chandrachur Singh – Maachis**
Best Female Debut
- **Seema Biswas – Bandit Queen**

== Special awards ==
=== Lifetime Achievement Award ===
Dharmendra and Mumtaz

=== Special Award ===
Govinda, Nasir Hussain, Pran and Shobhna Samarth

=== R. D. Burman Award ===
Vishal Bhardwaj – Maachis

== Critics' awards ==
=== Best Film ===
Khamoshi: The Musical

=== Best Actress ===
Manisha Koirala – Khamoshi: The Musical

=== Best Documentary ===
Beyond the Himalayas

== Biggest winners ==
- Khamoshi: The Musical – 5/13
- Raja Hindustani – 5/11
- Maachis – 4/11
- Ghatak: Lethal – 3/6
- Bandit Queen – 3/5

== See also ==
- Filmfare Awards
- 43rd Filmfare Awards
