= Sunny Deol =

Indian actor and filmmaker (born 1957)

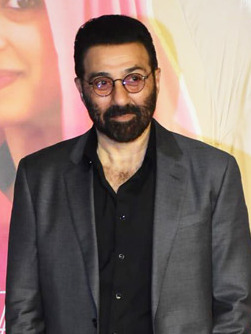
- Deol in 2024
- Born: Ajay Singh Deol; 19 October 1957 (age 69); Sahnewal, Punjab, India
- Education: R. A. Podar College, Mumbai
- Occupations: Actor; director; producer; politician
- Years active: 1983–present
- Organisation: Vijayta Films
- Works: Filmography
- Spouse: Lynda Deol (m. 1984)
- Children: 2
- Father: Dharmendra
- Relatives: Bobby Deol (brother); Esha Deol (half-sister); Abhay Deol (cousin)
- Family: Deol family
- Awards: Full list

Member of Parliament, Lok Sabha
- In office 23 May 2019 – 4 June 2024
- Preceded by: Sunil Kumar Jakhar
- Succeeded by: Sukhjinder Singh Randhawa
- Constituency: Gurdaspur, Punjab
- Party: Bharatiya Janata Party (2019–2024)

Ajay Singh Deol (born 19 October 1957), professionally known as Sunny Deol, is an Indian actor, filmmaker and former politician who works in Hindi films. One of the most commercially successful actors in the history of Indian cinema, he has worked in more than 100 films in a career spanning over four decades. He is particularly known for his angry action hero persona and various iconic dialogues, which have made Deol an enduring cultural icon of masculinity. Deol has won several awards including two National Film Awards, two Filmfare Awards, two Zee Cine Awards and one Screen Award. He was a Member of Parliament in the Lok Sabha, representing Gurdaspur in Punjab as a member of the Bharatiya Janata Party from 2019 to 2024. Forbes India named him to their Showstoppers 2026 list, recognizing the country's top 100 celebrities.

The elder son of actor Dharmendra, Deol made his acting debut opposite newcomer Amrita Singh in the romantic drama Betaab (1983), a major commercial success, and had further box-office hits in action films such as Arjun (1985), Paap Ki Duniya (1988) and Tridev (1989). He gained wider recognition and cemented star status for his portrayal of a boxer accused of murder in Rajkumar Santoshi's Ghayal (1990), winning the Filmfare Award for Best Actor and the National Film Award – Special Jury Award (Feature Film). His portrayal of a volatile lawyer in Santoshi's crime drama Damini (1993) won him the National Film Award for Best Supporting Actor and the Filmfare Award for Best Supporting Actor. He enjoyed further acclaim with films such as Darr (1993), Jeet (1996), Ghatak (1996), Ziddi (1997), Arjun Pandit (1999) and Indian (2001).

Deol had his biggest commercial successes in the period action films Border (1997) and Gadar: Ek Prem Katha (2001); for both he was nominated for Filmfare Award for Best Actor. The latter was the highest-grossing Hindi film to that point. He subsequently starred with his father and younger brother, Bobby Deol, in the drama Apne (2007) and the comedy Yamla Pagla Deewana (2011). After more than a decade of setbacks, he made a career comeback by reprising his role in Gadar 2 (2023), which became the highest-grossing film of his career and the fourth highest-grossing Hindi film at the time. He solidified this comeback with Jaat (2025), Border 2 (2026), and Ikka (2026), while also portraying Hanuman in Namit Malhotra's Ramayana.

== Early life and education ==
Ajay Singh Deol was born on 19 October 1957, in Sahnewal, Punjab, India, to Bollywood actor Dharmendra and his first wife Prakash Kaur, in a Punjabi Jat family affiliated with the Arya Samaj, a Hindu monotheist and reformist movement. He has a younger brother Bobby Deol and two sisters Vijeta and Ajeeta who are settled in California, United States. Hema Malini is his step-mother. Actress Esha Deol and Ahana Deol are his paternal younger half-sisters. His cousin Abhay Deol is also an actor.

Deol completed his schooling at Sacred Heart Boys High School in Mumbai, and pursued higher education at Ramniranjan Anandilal Podar College of Commerce and Economics in Mumbai. Deol has publicly admitted to having dyslexia, which caused difficulties with reading and writing in school. But he excelled in sports and co-curricular activities. In college, Deol was a quarrelsome student as he used to get into lots of fights and beat people. He used to carry metal rods and hockey sticks in his car for protection. He also engaged in street races and made modifications to his car. He wanted to pursue car racing as a career but was denied by his family.

After completing college, he went on to study theatre. He attended the renowned Old Rep Theatre in Birmingham. There he performed stage shows and returned to India to make his film debut. He was admitted based on a personal recommendation from Shashi Kapoor.

== Acting career ==
=== 1983–1984: Breakthrough with romantic roles ===
Deol made his debut with the 1983 romantic film Betaab which earned him his first nomination for the Filmfare Award for Best Actor. Produced by father Dharmendra and directed by Rahul Rawail, the film follows the story of two young lovers, played by Deol and Amrita Singh, navigating obstacles to their love amidst family conflicts and class divide. The plot of the film was loosely based on William Shakespeare’s The Taming Of The Shrew. The film emerged as a commercial success and went on to be one of the biggest hits of the year, emerging as the second highest-grossing Indian film of 1983. Betaab turned Deol and co-star Singh into overnight sensations. As noted by Time magazine's Richard Corliss, the film broke taboos in 1983 by featuring a rare on-screen kiss between its two leads. The music by R. D. Burman, also played a significant role as the song ‘Jab Hum Jawan Honge' was a chartbuster. Hajan Valley located in Kashmir, a major location in the film came to be known as Betaab Valley, which has since become a popular tourist destination in the region.

The following year, Deol starred in Sunny, Manzil Manzil, and Sohni Mahiwal, with only the latter becoming successful at the box office. Sohni Mahiwal (1984), an Indian-Russian film portrays the classic Punjabi folklore tragic love story of Sohni, portrayed by Poonam Dhillon, a potter's daughter, and Mahiwal (Deol), a wealthy merchant, amidst societal constraints. The film remains celebrated for its soundtrack and has attained cult classic status in Russia.

=== 1985–1989: Early success in action-drama ===
Deol broadened his range by appearing in Rahul Rawail's action film Arjun (1985), in which he played the titular role of an unemployed radical youth who, along with his friends, fights against the corrupt and exploitative system. The critically acclaimed film became a major hit, and established Deol's status as an action hero. Arjun is considered one of Deol's best works to date.

In 1986, he appeared alongside his father for the first time in the epic adventure Sultanat. The film, however, did not perform well at the box office, despite high production values. Deol starred in a series of commercially successful action films in the late 1980s. In Dacait (1987), he portrayed a man driven to rebellion after his family is killed due to feudal oppression. His intense and emotionally resonant performance was praised, despite the film's grim tone. In Paap Ki Duniya (1988), Deol portrayed a criminal raised by a crime lord. His character, caught between his upbringing and his conscience, added complexity to the action driven narrative. That same year, he starred in the western Yateem (1988), directed by J. P. Dutta, playing an orphan facing ostracism for his stepson status.

In Vardi (1989), he played a cop trying to dismantle a crime syndicate. He also headlined Rajiv Rai's action thriller Tridev (1989), playing the author backed role of a suspended police officer framed for a crime he didn't commit. The film, a major success and the third-highest-grossing of 1989, received several awards and revitalised the multi-starrer genre in the industry. His performance, alongside Naseeruddin Shah, Jackie Shroff and Madhuri Dixit, was well-received by audiences and critics alike. Deol took on a lighter role in ChaalBaaz (1989), a slapstick comedy film starring Sridevi in a dual role alongside Rajinikanth. The film was a commercial success and became the fifth highest-grossing film of the year. This period firmly established Deol as a prominent action star in Hindi cinema, leading to a series of high-profile roles in the following decade.

=== 1990–2003: Established actor ===
Deol starred as a boxer avenging his brother's death in Ghayal (1990), directed by debutant Rajkumar Santoshi; for which he received widespread critical acclaim. The film became the year's second highest-grossing film worldwide and the highest-grossing film domestically. The film grossed ₹20 crore and was declared a blockbuster by Box Office India. The film won him the Filmfare Award for Best Actor and the National Film Award – Special Jury Award (Feature Film). The success of the film established Deol as a bonafide box office draw and the film recorded a large repeat audience. Ghayal was rereleased many times throughout the 90s and grossed several times more than its original run, with many theatres showing it to packed houses. It is the second most successful Indian film in repeat runs, behind only Sholay.

Due to the overwhelming success of Ghayal, Deol enjoyed a very successful period throughout the 90s. From 1991 to 2001, he delivered back-to-back successes. Starting with Yodha in 1991 in which he co-starred alongside Sanjay Dutt. It received mostly average reviews and earned ₹12.95 crore against a budget of ₹2.85 crore. The same year, Narsimha, where he played a strongman who rebels against a politician, was another success and emerged as the 8th highest grossing Indian film of 1991.

In 1992, he appeared in his only release Vishwatma. The film received critical acclaim upon release from contemporary as well as modern critics, with praise drawn towards its screenplay and action sequences. It earned over ₹9.5 crore in its total theatrical run worldwide and was the sixth highest-grossing Indian film of 1992. It proved to be a major launchpad for Chunky Pandey as well as for debutanté Divya Bharti. The film is best remembered today for its decade-defining song "Saat Samundar Paar", which featured Deol and Bharti.

1993 was a noteworthy year for Deol as he starred in four major films of the year: Lootere, Kshatriya, Damini and Darr. Lootere was an action film where Deol played a cop investing the murder of his colleague with the help of a bar dancer. It ranked among the biggest hits of that year. In Kshatriya, he appeared as a royal warrior caught in the rivalry between two Rajput clans. The film featured a star cast of Sanjay Dutt, Sunil Dutt, Dharmendra, Vinod Khanna, Rakhee Gulzar, Meenakshi Seshadri, Raveena Tandon and Divya Bharti. Released worldwide on 26 March 1993, it recorded a record-breaking opening at the box office. Although it was well received by both critics and audiences, the film was withdrawn from theatres shortly after release due to Sanjay Dutt's involvement in 1993 Bombay bombings case.

Also in 1993, Deol reunited with Rajkumar Santoshi to play an alcoholic lawyer in the highly successful crime drama Damini and was awarded the Filmfare Award for Best Supporting Actor and the National Film Award for Best Supporting Actor. The pathbreaking film was praised for breaking social taboos and handling the subject of rape with sensitivity; a rarity in Bollywood at the time. It further strengthened Deol's He-Man image. His dialogues in the film "Tarikh Pe Tarikh" (date after date) and "Dhai Kilo Ka Haath" (Two-and-a-half kilogram hand) became iconic and a pop-culture reference. The film was a milestone in the careers of Deol as well as Amrish Puri who went onto star in various films together in the future. Besides being critically acclaimed, the film also became the sixth highest-grossing film of the year and was declared a "hit" by Box Office India. That same year, Deol portrayed the character of a lieutenant army officer in Yash Chopra's musical psychological thriller Darr. The film earned Deol his third nomination for the Filmfare Award for Best Actor. It was declared a blockbuster and was the third-highest-grossing film of the year in India, and the highest-grossing Indian film of the year in the overseas markets. It received widespread acclaim from critics upon release. It was also noted for being Shah Rukh Khan's breakthrough film.

In 1994's Insaniyat, he appeared alongside Amitabh Bachchan. The production had finished in 1988 but it was delayed for several years and finally released on 11 March 1994. By the time it released, Bachchan had gone into semi-retirement post the release of Khuda Gawah (1992) and it was citied as Bachchan's last film. Due to Deol and Bachchan's pairing, the film got an excellent opening but was panned critically due to poor editing and unfinished storyline. It still turned out to be the 10th highest-grossing film of the year. He also starred in the successful Imtihaan (1994), alongside newcomer Saif Ali Khan, playing the returning former husband of Raveena Tandon's character who was presumed dead.

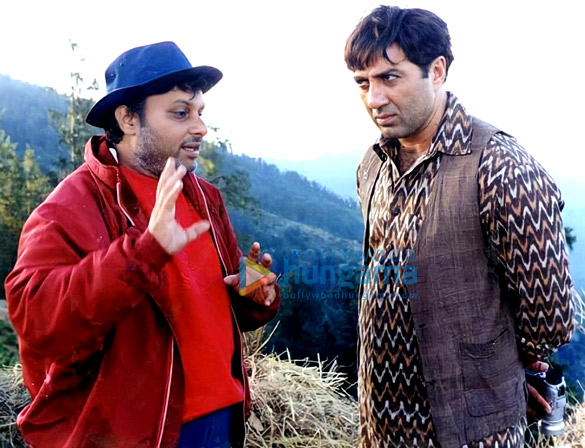
Deol and Anil Sharma on the sets of Gadar: Ek Prem Katha in 2000.

At the time, 1996 marked Deol's most successful year in terms of commercial success. The audiences saw four releases that year including Himmat, Jeet, Ghatak, and Ajay. Starring Alongside Salman Khan and Karisma Kapoor, Jeet earned a worldwide collection of ₹30.5 crore. It became the 3rd highest grossing Bollywood film of 1996. In Jeet, Deol played a hitman who falls in love with a woman, prompting a dramatic struggle between his criminal past and a yearning for a better future. His performance was appreciated, with praise drawn towards his ability to blend action with romance. In a notable scene, Deol portrays his character’s frustration following a betrayal by delivering several iconic lines. These include: "Tum Sirf Meri Ho, Aur Kisi Ki Nahi Ho Sakti" (You belong only to me and can belong to no one else), "Inn Haathon Ne Sirf Hathyar Chhode Hain, Chalana Nahi Bhulle" (These hands have only laid down their weapons, they have not forgotten how to use them), "Agar Is Chaukhat Par Baraat Aayi, Toh Doli Ki Jagah Unki Arthiyan Uthengi" (If a wedding procession reaches this doorstep, funeral pyres will depart instead of a palanquin), and "Lashe Bichha Dunga Lashe" (I will lay down a carpet of corpses). Deol also starred alongside Karisma Kapoor in Ajay, which was also successful and found its place in the list of highest grossers of the year. Ghatak, released the same year, received critical and commercial acclaim, and was declared a blockbuster by Box Office India. It marked Santoshi's third collaboration with Deol, Seshadri, and Puri after Ghayal (1990) and Damini (1993). In this film, Deol played one of his most iconic characters Kashi Nath, who fights against a ruthless gangster to free his neighbourhood from tyranny and restore peace. The film earned Deol his fourth nomination for the Filmfare Award for Best Actor. Deol's dialogues in Ghatak such as "Ye Mazdoor Ka Haath Hai Katya" (This is a labourer's hand, Katya), "Utha Utha Ke Patkunga" (I will lift you and slam you repeatedly), and "Cheer Dunga Faad Dunga Saale" (I will tear you apart, you bastard) became popular among the audiences and influenced the pop culture of the time period.

Deol kicked off 1997 with Ziddi which had a lifetime collection of Rs. 324.3 million and was one of the highest grossing hits of 1997. He played a larger than life role of Deva, a hot headed man who takes revenge on the corrupt politicians responsible for his family's suffering. The film flourished particularly in the domestic market. He followed it up with Border, an epic war film based on the real life events that happened during the Battle of Longewala in 1971, in which Deol played the leading role of decorated Indian Army officer Brigadier Kuldip Singh Chandpuri. The film featured an ensemble cast of Deol, Jackie Shroff, Sunil Shetty, Akshaye Khanna, Tabu, Raakhee, Pooja Bhatt, including others. It opened to strong box office results and was declared an all-time blockbuster by Box Office India. It also became the highest-grossing Hindi film of 1997 domestically, and the second highest-grossing Indian film of the year worldwide. Border grossed a domestic nett of ₹66.70 crore and it was the fourth biggest blockbuster film of the 90s decade. It is often listed among the best Indian war films ever. The film was awarded several accolades, and earned Deol his fifth nomination for the Filmfare Award for Best Actor.

In 1998, Deol collaborated with Guddu Dhanoa once again after Ziddi (1997), to star in the action film Salaakhen. Featuring an identical cast to Ziddi, Raveena Tandon, Anupam Kher and Farida Jalal played supporting roles. The film was noted for its action sequences, cast performances and a notable monologue delivered by Deol during a courtroom hearing scene. Released on 24 April 1998, it recorded an excellent opening and was another hit for the actor.

His 1999 film Arjun Pandit marked his first collaboration with director Rahul Rawail after Yodha. Due to the critical and commercial success of their previous collaborations Betaab (1983), Arjun (1985), Dacait (1987), and Yodha (1991), the film was one of the most awaited films of the year. Although it was not well reviewed upon release, the film became a hit. UP gangster Vikas Dubey was reported to be an ardent fan of this movie and rumoured to have watched it over 100 times. Inspired by his love for this movie, he had earned the monicker Pandit. In 1999 he made his directorial debut with Dillagi starring himself, his brother and Urmila Matondkar, but the film failed to gain success.

His first blockbuster hit in the millennium was 2001 film Gadar: Ek Prem Katha, directed by Anil Sharma, in which Deol played the role of a patriotic Indian truck driver, Tara Singh who falls in love with a Muslim girl, Sakeena, in the backdrop of 1947 partition violence, and makes a dramatic trip to Pakistan to get back his beloved. Gadar became the highest-grossing Hindi film up until then in mainstream cinema earning over ₹1.3 billion (US$14 million) worldwide. It ranks among the top 3 Indian films in all-time highest footfalls since 1990s. Gadar is also the third highest-grossing film in India since the 1990s when adjusted for inflation. The famous "Handpump scene" became a major cultural symbol and influenced the contemporary parody culture in India in the following years. Deol received high praise for his performance.

"To state that Gadar belongs to Deol would be an understatement. It's difficult to imagine any other actor essaying this role with precision. The actor takes to the character like a fish takes to water and emerges triumphant."

— Taran Adarsh of IndiaFM.

Deol was paid ₹6 crore (US$640,000) for his role in Gadar, the highest for any Indian actor at that time. The film earned him his sixth nomination for the Filmfare Award for Best Actor. In the same year, Deol also worked in another successful action thriller film Indian (2001). It received a record breaking opening, grossing a domestic nett of ₹18.0 million on its opening day. It was the fourth highest-grossing Hindi film of the year in India with collection of ₹42.60 crore. Critics felt that Deol's role of DCP Rajshekhar Azad was "tailor-made" for him.

In 2002, Deol starred in the war film Maa Tujhhe Salaam which opened strongly and despite being among the highest-grossing films of the year, only emerged as a box office disappointment due to poor reviews. He played the role of Indian revolutionary Chandra Shekhar Azad in 23rd March 1931: Shaheed, starring his brother Bobby Deol in the role of Bhagat Singh. The film's release coincided with another film based on Bhagat Singh, directed by Rajkumar Santoshi and titled The Legend of Bhagat Singh. Both films failed at the box office.

Then, in 2003, Deol teamed up with director Anil Sharma yet again to play an R&AW agent inThe Hero: Love Story of a Spy, which also starred Preity Zinta and the debutant Priyanka Chopra. Released on 11 April, The Hero was billed as Bollywood's most expensive film at that time with an estimated budget of ₹600 million (US$6.4 million). The film became the third highest-grossing Bollywood film of that year. Derek Elley from Variety wrote about the film and called it "a wildly over-the-top, stridently nationalistic but undeniably entertaining slice of hokum."

=== 2004–2021: Sporadic success and career setbacks ===
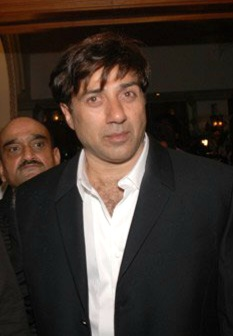
Deol attending the release of Dev Anand's autobiography Romancing with Life in 2007.

At this juncture in his career, Deol avoided traditional action films due to back injuries and experimented with various genres, achieving lackluster success. He later commented that his style of cinema went out of trend due to changing industry standards and there were no suitable roles available for him. While his contemporaries like Sanjay Dutt and Anil Kapoor navigated the same challenges by switching to supporting roles, Deol held his ground as a leading man.

In 2004, Deol starred in Lakeer, which featured an ensemble cast including Sunil Shetty, and newcomers Sohail Khan and John Abraham. The film was a flop. In the same year, he starred in the low budget sports comedy film Rok Sako To Rok Lo.

Jo Bole So Nihaal, Deol's 2005 solo release, sparked a trend of comedic films featuring carefree and jovial Sikh protagonists, exemplified by later releases like Singh is Kinng (2008), Son of Sardaar (2012), Singh is Bliing (2015), and Deol's own Yamla Pagla Deewana franchise. However, the film also generated controversy, with its title, a Sikh spiritual phrase, and certain scenes angering Sikh groups. Bombings at two theatres led to its withdrawal from cinemas and its eventual box office failure.

In early 2006, Deol starred in the techno-thriller Teesri Aankh. It marked the second time he co-starred alongside Ameesha Patel, after the all-time blockbuster Gadar. The film was inspired by the 1994 movie Mute Witness. It was panned by critics and turned out to be a disaster. In September 2006, Deol took on a role in the action-adventure film Naksha, an endeavour by Bollywood to capture the essence of films seen in the Indiana Jones and The Mummy series. Despite being hailed as ahead of its time by certain critics, the movie unfortunately met with box office failure.

Deol kicked off 2007 with Big Brother, a vigilante film. This was supposed to be Priyanka Chopra's first release in 2002 but was delayed by almost 5 years. Continuing his year, he appeared in the heist comedy Fool N Final, sharing the spotlight with emerging talents Shahid Kapoor and Ayesha Takia. This film was also a box office disappointment. Deol regained momentum with the 2007 family sports drama Apne, directed by Anil Sharma. The film, which was a commercial success, marked the first onscreen collaboration between Deol, his father Dharmendra, and his brother Bobby Deol. He portrayed the son of a former boxer who returns to the sport to avenge his brother’s defeat. While critic Sukanya Verma argued the role would have better suited Deol earlier in his career, she praised his earnest performance and his portrayal of vulnerability during scenes of conflict with his father's character.

In 2008, he appeared with his brother again in the ensemble film Heroes. Deol's performance, although brief, was praised. 2009 saw Deol star in the thriller Fox (2009) opposite Arjun Rampal. It marked the only film in which Deol appeared as an anti-hero. The film was inspired from Hollywood film A Murder of Crows (1999). It was another commercial failure for the actor.

Deol's first release of 2010 was Neeraj Pathak's crime thriller Right Yaaa Wrong which had him playing a police inspector. Yamla Pagla Deewana which also featured him alongside his father and brother was Deol's only release in 2011. The surreal comedy was declared a hit.

For the first time in his career, Deol lent his voice in the Animated film Mahabharata for the role of Bheem. It earned ₹16.9 million. Yamla Pagla Deewana 2, a sequel to his 2011 hit was released in 2013 but the film was a critical and box office failure. In the end of 2013 Deol teamed up with Anil Sharma yet again for Singh Saab The Great which was received positively. It was Deol's comeback to traditional action genre and the film turned out be a moderate success. His dialogue in the film, "Bali Hamesha Bakre Ki Di Jaati Hai, Sher Ki Nahi" (Sacrifice is always made of a goat, not a lion) became popular.

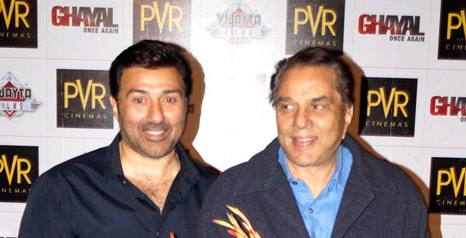
Sunny Deol and father Dharmendra in 2016.

In 2015, he worked in Radhika Rao and Vinay Sapru's I Love NY opposite Kangana Ranaut. Due to an unknown reason, the film was delayed from its original release date of 2011 and released several years later. It did not fare well at the box office.

In 2016, Ghayal Once Again was released which was a sequel to his 1990 film Ghayal. It marked Deol's second film directorial since Dillagi (1999). It was one of the most anticipated movies of the year. The action sequences were praised but the story and pacing were criticised. The film earned well upon release, but was ultimately declared a failure by the end of its theatrical run.

In 2017, he and his brother appeared in Shreyas Talpade's comedy film Poster Boys, which deals with the topic of vasectomy but flopped at the box office. This was Bobby Deol's comeback film after a hiatus of three years but could not re-establish him.

In 2018, Deol appeared in Yamla Pagla Deewana: Phir Se, the third film in the franchise. Also that year, two of his long delayed films Bhaiyyaji Superhitt (where he plays a double role for the first time), and Mohalla Assi were released. All of them were box office failures. Mohalla Assi faced opposition before release by the court for hurting religious sentiments and was leaked online in 2015 by piracy. In the film, Deol played an idealistic Hindu pandit attempting to expose fraudulent spiritual leaders preying on foreign tourists in Varanasi. His use of blunt language and slurs, while controversial, was praised for demonstrating his range, despite the film's largely negative reception.

Deol took a break from acting between 2019 and 2021, during which he declined the lead role in the 2019 blockbuster film Kesari. Instead, in 2019, he returned to the director’s chair for the third time with Pal Pal Dil Ke Paas, a film that marked the acting debut of his son Karan Deol, who starred alongside another newcomer, Sahher Bambba, in the lead roles.

=== 2022–present: Resurgence ===
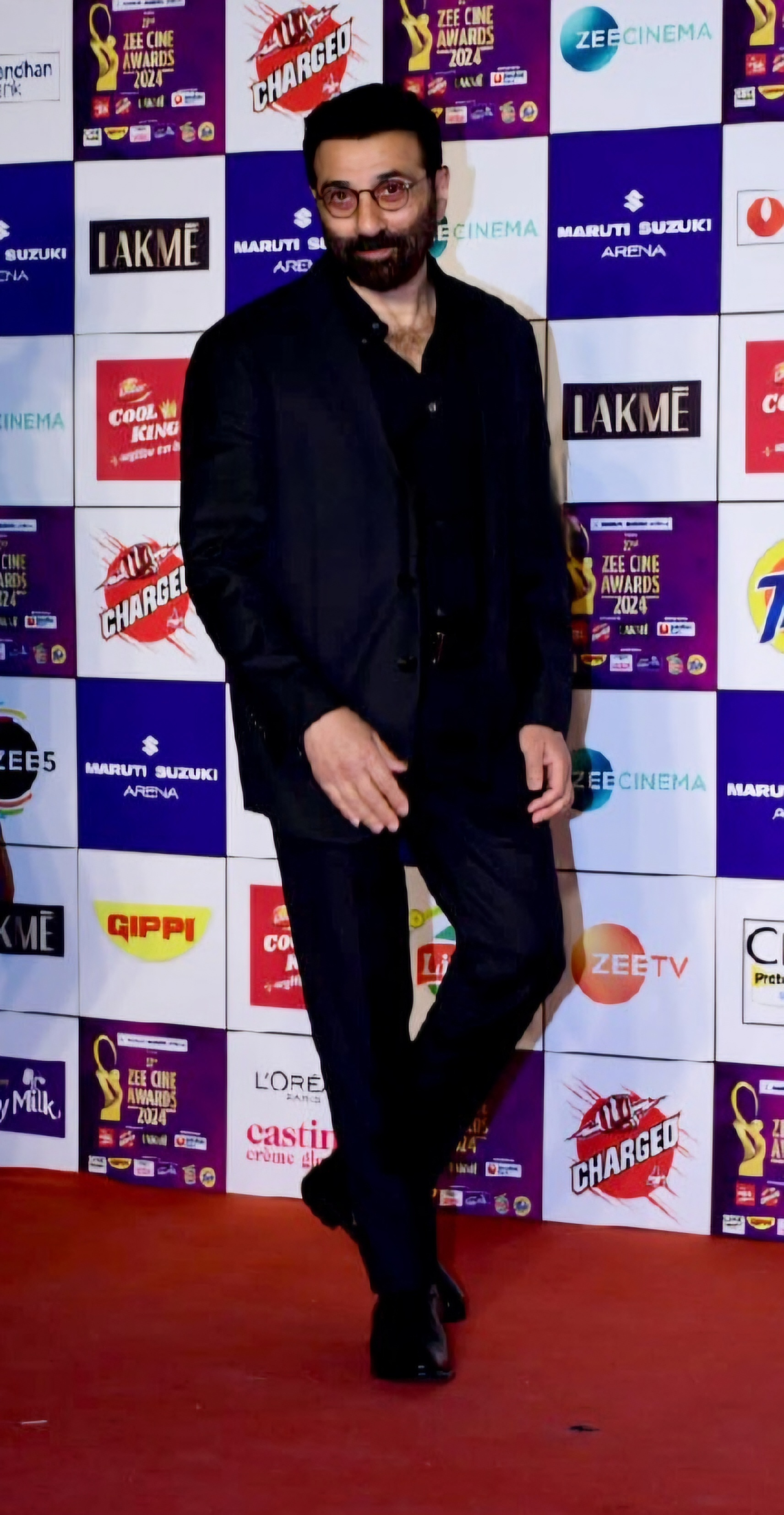
Deol on the red carpet at Zee Cine Awards 2024.

In 2022, after a break of two years, Deol starred in the crime thriller Chup: Revenge of the Artist directed by R. Balki. Alongside Dulquer Salmaan, Shreya Dhanwanthary and Pooja Bhatt. The plot of the film centred around a serial killer who targets dishonest film critics. Released on 23 September 2022, where the film as well as Deol's received positive reviews from critics. Roktim Rajpal of India Today praised Deol as a scene stealer with natural intensity, writing that "The veteran actor delivers a beautifully restrained performance." Deol won the Lions Gold Awards for Male Action Star Of The Year 2022.

The sequel of the 2001 film Gadar, Gadar 2, was released on 11 August 2023. The film's story was centred around the era of the Indo-Pakistani War of 1971, in which Deol as Tara Singh returns to Pakistan to bring back his son. It was directed and produced by Anil Sharma, and the film starred Deol along with Ameesha Patel, and Utkarsh Sharma in lead roles. Gadar 2 emerged as the highest-grossing film in Deol's career. The film earned ₹691 crore worldwide, and became the year's 4th highest-grosser, as well as one of the highest-grossing Indian films of all time. Deol's performance in Gadar 2 earned him several award nominations, including his seventh nomination for a Filmfare Award in the Best Actor category. Deol won the Zee Cine Award for Best Actor (Viewer's Choice) for Gadar 2, while he was also named the GQ India Leading Man of the Year 2023. It reestablished Deol as a bankable actor and marked his return to mainstream cinema.

He announced an action film titled SDGM to be directed by Gopichand Malineni in July 2024, which was later renamed Jaat and released on 10 April 2025. In a favourable review, Bollywood Hungama noted the film's action sequences, mass appeal, and acting performances, singling out Deol's screen presence and deeming him outstanding. The film registered a decent opening and subsequently gained momentum, to emerge as a success after grossing over ₹100 crore, his third film to do so after Gadar and its sequel. Jaat launched successfully on Netflix, accumulating 10.3 million hours watched in its first week. It topped the platform's top 10 films chart in India for four weeks and also appeared on the global top 10 films list.

Deol starred as Lt. Col. Fateh Singh Kaler in Border 2, the spiritual sequel to the 1997 film Border. Greenlit in June 2024, the highly anticipated project is directed by Anurag Singh and features an ensemble cast including Varun Dhawan, Diljit Dosanjh, and Ahan Shetty. The film released on 23 January 2026, to coincide with the Republic Day weekend. Critics noted his return to form, drawing comparisons to the peak of his earlier career. Taran Adarsh labelled his performance "commanding," while Bollywood Hungama lauded his versatility in both emotional and combat sequences. Devesh Sharma of Filmfare further characterised his role as "a composite figure, part mentor and part myth, embodying the steely command and moral authority of senior Army leadership." He was paid ₹50 crore for his role. The film was a blockbuster at box-office and became the 2nd highest grossing Indian film of the year.

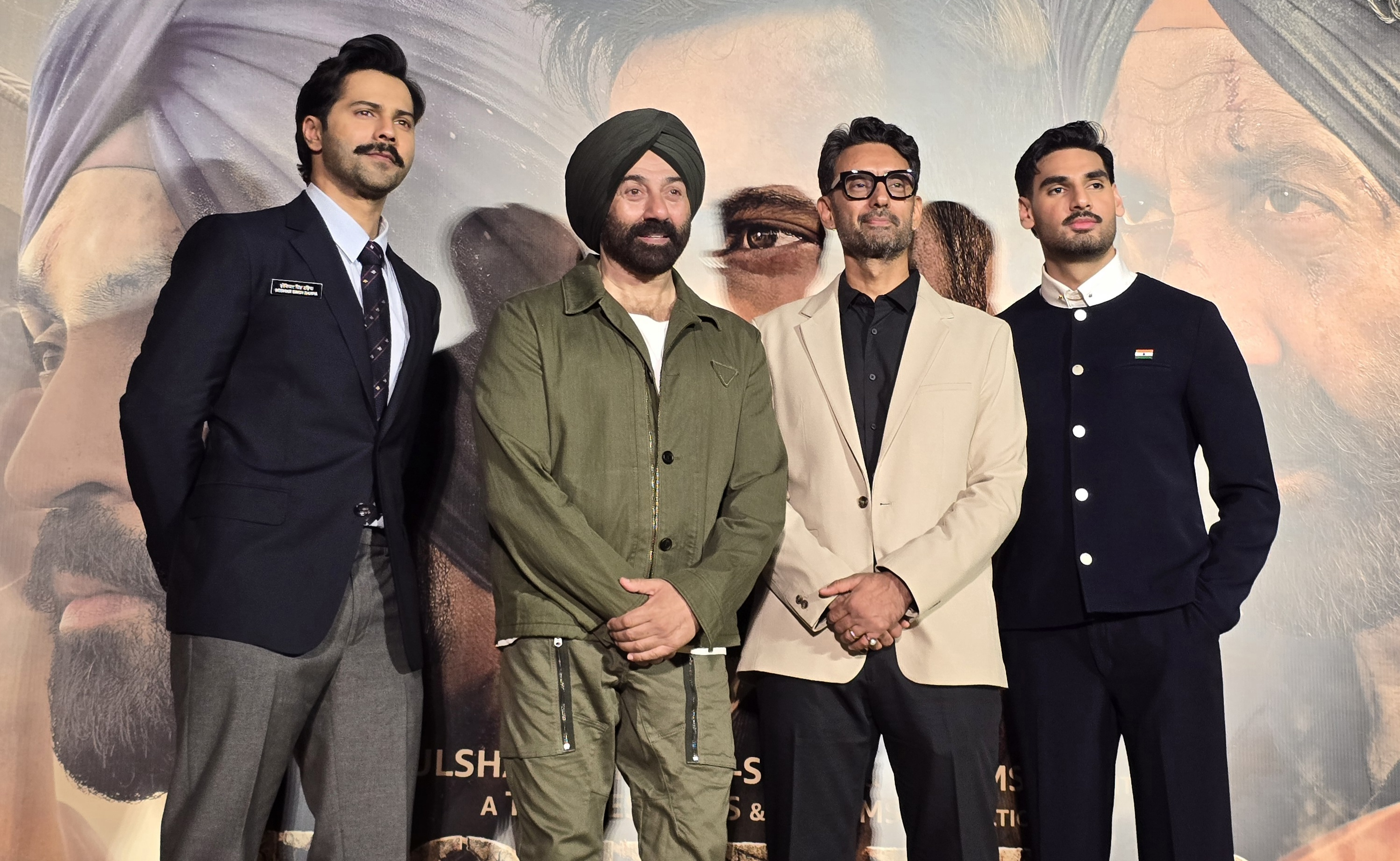
Deol with Varun Dhawan, Anurag Singh, and Ahan Shetty at the launch of Border 2 in 2026.

After the continuous success of these films, Deol's career became the subject of a comeback story. Critics like Yasser Usman of NDTV noted that the actor did not reinvent himself, instead, audience tastes circled back to his style over time. Jigar Shah of The Times of India attributed the comeback to nostalgia. He stated that the mass audience had not forgotten him, but the industry had simply stopped producing his type of films.

Released on 10 July 2026, the Netflix original production Ikka starred the actor in the titular role alongside Akshaye Khanna, marking Deol's direct-to-streaming debut. The film, which received mixed-to-positive reviews from critics, featured Deol as a renowned, incorruptible lawyer known in the legal community as "Ikka", who is forced to choose between defending a degenerate despite his conscience and saving his daughter's life. Noted entertainment journalist Puja Talwar, applauded his performance, stating, "Deol’s expressive eyes allow him to convey Arjun’s simmering internal conflict with remarkable restraint. He underplays the role far more than audiences might expect, replacing chest-thumping heroics with guilt, helplessness and quiet anguish". Tanisha Bhattacharya of NDTV praised his vulnerable performance as a tenacious character losing his identity and battling guilt when forced into compliance. The film set multiple streaming records, achieving the third-largest 2026 Netflix India opening with 10.1 million view hours and ranking second globally among non-English films. A week later, it remained number one in 16 countries and entered the top five worldwide.

Deol at the launch of Ramayana: Part 1.

Deol reunited with Rajkumar Santohi to headline Batwara 1947, produced by Aamir Khan. Based on the play Jis Lahore Nai Vekhya, O Jamya E Nai by Asghar Wajahat, it is set against the backdrop of 1947 partition of India and released on 14 August 2026, during the Independence Day week. The film also featured his son Karan Deol, Preity Zinta, and Shabana Azmi. This marked his first collaboration with Santoshi since Ghatak (1996), reuniting an actor-director duo widely considered one of the most iconic of the 1990s. The film received mixed reviews, though Deol's poignant scenes with Azmi earned praise. Following an underwhelming opening, it ultimately emerged as a commercial failure. Post Batwara 1947, his films crossed a cumulative ₹1,000 crore net collection in the post-COVID era, making him the oldest actor to achieve this mark.

He portrayed Hanuman in Namit Malhotra's production of Ramayana: Part 1 (2026), directed by Nitesh Tiwari and based on the ancient Indian epic. Although his name was heavily featured in the film's promotional campaign and posters, his character was kept secret throughout the lead up to release. Ultimately, Deol's likeness and voice were revealed exclusively during a brief post-credit scene. The reveal was well received and became a major source of anticipation for the sequel.

Deol has various upcoming projects lined up. He will portray Hanuman again in Ramayana: Part 2 (2028). Deol will star in Suryaa, set for release on November 20, 2026, which scrutinizes the healthcare system. He will be portraying a middle aged man in the family drama Safar. Initially planned as a direct-to-streaming release, the film will now have a theatrical release. He will collaborate with Farhan Akhtar's Excel Entertainment and director Balaji, in his Hindi directorial debut, on a high-budget action thriller. He is scheduled to reunite with Anil Sharma to star in Coal King, a film based on coal mafia. He personally announced his upcoming film, Gabru, which will be written and directed by Shashank Udapurkar. He will next act in the upcoming film Jaat 2, to be directed by Rajkumar Santoshi. Its shooting will begin in late 2026 and it will be released in 2027. He is scheduled to star in filmmaker Nikhil Nagesh Bhat's upcoming large-scale action film Parshuram.

== Political career ==
Deol joined the Bharatiya Janata Party (BJP) on 23 April 2019. Ahead of the elections, he made several promises, including pledging to open the border for trade with Pakistan and Central Asian nations. While his intentions were praised, his approach was criticised to be impractical and politically naive. He won the 2019 Lok Sabha Elections from Gurdaspur constituency in Punjab against Sunil Jakhar of the INC, by a margin of 82,459 votes.

Deol's political career was deemed unsuccessful. Tribune India remarked, "History will not be kind to... Sunny Deol, when it judges him as an MP in the times to come." By 11 December 2023, he had an attendance of 18% in the Parliament. The national average for the same is 79%. Deol missed six parliamentary sessions and posed only four questions, with just one concerning Gurdaspur. He inquired about illegal sand mining in his constituency but did not engage in any debates. Deol stopped visiting Gurdaspur after September 2020 and failed to return even during the floods in August 2023. Deol utilised only ₹7 crore from his MP Local Area Development Fund over five years, despite being entitled to ₹5 crore annually. In the last two years of his term, he made no requests for funds and spent nothing in his constituency from the available resources. When questioned for his minimal participation in the lower house, he addressed, “When I go [to Lok Sabha], I see people who run the country are sitting there, from every party. But how do they behave? And then we tell others not to behave that way."

In an Aap Ki Adaalat interview, Deol addressed concerns about his low attendance in Parliament, stating that his focus was on serving his constituency and that his presence in Parliament did not impact his work. He also cited COVID-19 as a factor contributing to his absence. Deol emphasised that, while he has a record of his accomplishments, he is not one to publicly promote them. He became secluded towards the end and did not invite a single person from his constituency to his son's wedding in June 2023.

Deol announced his decision not to seek re-election in 2024, stating that he is not suited for politics and wishes to focus on creating quality cinema.

== Personal life ==
Sunny Deol is married to Lynda Deol (a.k.a. Pooja Deol), who comes from an Anglo-Indian family. Her father, Krishan Dev Mahal, is an Indian while her mother, June Sarah Mahal, is British. The couple has two sons, Karan (b. 1990) and Rajveer (b. 1994).

Lynda has also written the story of one of Sunny’s hit films - Yamla Pagla Deewana 2, while their son, Karan, was an assistant director on the same film and has rapped in a song sung by Diljit Dosanjh in the film. He made his Bollywood debut in 2019 with the Hindi-language feature film Pal Pal Dil Ke Paas, directed by Sunny. He then starred in the 2021 crime comedy film Velle, a remake of the Telugu-language film Brochevarevarura. He is set to play a role in Sunny Deol's upcoming film Lahore 1947.

In June 2023, Karan Deol married Drisha Acharya in the presence of the entire Deol family, including Dharmendra, Sunny Deol and Bobby Deol. The same year, Rajveer made his Bollywood debut with the Hindi-language feature film Dono, in which he starred alongside Paloma Dhillon, daughter of actress Poonam Dhillon.

The Deol family, though influential and frequently discussed in the media, maintains a low profile by rarely attending social events and keeping their activities private.

== Legacy ==
Deol is frequently recognised as a superstar of Indian cinema. He established himself as an action hero, with his roles in Arjun (1985), Ghayal (1990), Ghatak (1996), Border (1997), and Gadar: Ek Prem Katha (2001). Deol's portrayals personified masculinity and anti-authoritarianism in India. At the peak of his career, Deol was known for his muscular physique. He has been noted as one of the pioneers who kickstarted the trend of bodybuilding in Bollywood. Deol was one of the prominent actors of Hindi cinema in the 1980s, 1990s, and early 2000s, appearing in Box Office India's list of top actors nine times from 1989 to 2002. Deol topped the list twice, in 1997 and 2001. Deol was one of the highest paid actors of Hindi cinema during the 1990s. Since 1990, Deol has the third most bumper openings at the box office with a total of 10, behind only Shah Rukh Khan (18) and Salman Khan (14). He has also given three record openers since 1990 including Kshatriya (1993), Border (1997), and Indian (2001). Deol is the first and only Indian actor to deliver an all-time blockbuster as a lead hero after turning 60, he was 66 when he accomplished this landmark with his 2023 release Gadar 2. He has been compared to Sylvester Stallone, earning him the moniker of "Indian Rambo".

In 2016, Geeta Phogat, the Indian wrestler and Olympic gold medalist, expressed her admiration for Deol, citing him as her favourite actor and how she drew inspiration from his "angry man" portrayals. Also in 2016, actors Varun Dhawan and John Abraham referred to Deol as "the greatest action hero of Bollywood". Deol's dialogues, including "Balwant Rai Ke Kutto", "Dhai Kilo ka Haath", "Tarikh Pe Tarikh", "Cheer Dunga Faad Dunga Saale", "Yeh Mazdoor Ka Haath Hai Katya" and "Tum Sirf Meri Ho, Kisi Aur Ki Nahi Ho Sakti" are considered iconic. In 2019, Prime Minister Narendra Modi lauded Sunny Deol and celebrated India's spirit by tweeting one of Deol's dialogues: "Hindustan Zindabad Tha, Zindabad Hai, Aur Zindabad Rahega". The dialogue "Tarikh Pe Tarikh" has become a widely used phrase to criticise delays in the Indian judicial system. Former Chief Justice of India D.Y. Chandrachud invoked the line to publicly condemn the culture. Amit Shah referenced the phrase in the Lok Sabha on 20 December 2023, while discussing the overhaul of the criminal justice system.

In 2022, he was placed in Outlook India's "75 Best Bollywood Actors" list. News18 named him "The Blockbuster King Of The '90s". In 2023, Deol was referenced in the lyrics of Haryanvi singer Raju Punjabi's viral song "Choudhar Jaat Ki". The specific lines from the song were, "Hawa banai thadi re meri Sunny Deol si body re (I make you look good with my Sunny Deol-like body)". Deol is renowned for his powerful voice, serving as an inspiration for many imitators and voice actors. Kiku Sharda repeatedly parodied Deol on The Kapil Sharma Show and continues to do so on The Great Indian Kapil Show. In the popular Hindi-dubbed version of the cartoon series Oggy and the Cockroaches, aired for Nickelodeon, the character of Jack is voiced by Saurav Chakrabarti, who emulates Deol's distinctive vocal style, as well as in the 2013 Indian animated series, Pakdam Pakdai, Saurav similarly voiced the character of Colonel. In the 2025 film Son of Sardaar 2, Ajay Devgn reenacts a famous scene from Border. He delivers the dialogue originally spoken by Deol: "Tumme Se Kisi Ek Ne Bhi Bhaagne Ki Koshish Ki Toh Main Goli Maar Doonga." That same year, the blockbuster film Dhurandhar featured a dialogue referencing two of Deol's previous films. Ranveer Singh delivered the line, "Ghayal Hoon, Isiliye Ghatak Hoon" (transl. "I am Wounded, which is why I am Lethal").

Deol's signature on-screen persona has made him a frequent cultural reference point for moral righteousness and explosive rage, cementing his association with these traits across cinema. For instance, in the film Udta Teer when the character Bilal Ahmad is called out for his behavior, he is explicitly told that he is acting like Sunny Deol.

== Artistry ==
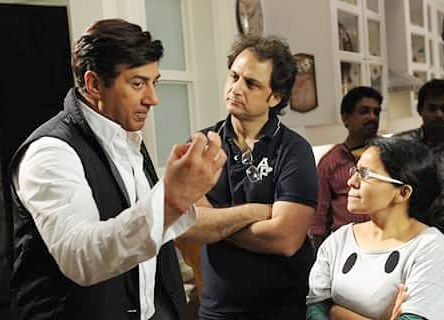
Deol with Vinay Sapru and Radhika Rao.

Many of Deol's films share unique elements which have become characteristic of his body of work. Primarily, his films often centre around protagonists hailing from modest backgrounds, who find themselves entangled in conflicts with crime syndicates and systemic corruption. Despite seeking help from legal channels, the characters invariably encounter hurdles within the justice system, compelling them to take matters into their own hands and resort to vigilantism as a means of seeking retribution against the antagonists. This narrative framework serves as a vehicle for exploring broader societal issues, including the shortcomings of law enforcement, discrimination, exploitation of the marginalised, and pervasive corruption, which are portrayed through the protagonists' struggles and impassioned dialogues delivered by Deol.

In contrast to the stereotype of the silent action hero, Deol's characters are men of action and articulate numerous words. Initially conflict-avoidant, they pivot to unfiltered anger when met with opposition, progressing to threats of violence charged with indignation, and ultimately resorting to physical force. Notably, Deol's characters seldom instigate violence independently and only respond when provoked.

Deol's filmography is also marked by instances of graphic violence, such as the arm-tearing scene in Ziddi (1997). Moreover, he frequently assumes roles of leadership, either of military units, as in Border (1997) and Maa Tujhhe Salaam (2002), or radical vigilante groups evident in films like Arjun (1985), Ghayal (1990), Ziddi (1997) and Big Brother (2007).

In his portrayal of everyday interactions, Deol's characters embody the ideal citizen advocating for truth, honesty, integrity, and patriotism, while exhibiting profound respect for familial and individual values. Physically, Deol embodies a rugged and muscular physique, distinguished by its lack of hyper-vascular aesthetics and the presence of natural body hair. Even in romantic relationships, Deol is depicted as a caring and respectful partner characterised by consideration for his partner's feelings and autonomy. They avoid overly dramatic displays of love and do not chase their love interest upon rejection, a departure from conventional Bollywood portrayals of romance.

Deol has consistently faced criticism for his dancing skills throughout his career. In defence, the actor argues that his characters portray relatable individuals who are not expected to be expert dancers. However, this explanation has not shielded him from public scrutiny, as his choreography has often been the subject of parody and memes. Early in his career, Deol largely refrained from dancing, but as his career progressed, his dance routines became a distinctive part of his screen persona. Songs like Yaara O Yaara gained popularity not only for their music but also for Deol's unconventional dance moves. Deol has acknowledged the criticism openly and maintains a lighthearted attitude towards it.

The 1990s in India were marked by significant socio-economic changes, the emergence of social justice politics, and the implementation of various reforms. Deol's characters embodied the frustrations and aspirations of the common man during this transformative period. His films became cultural touchstones of the time, resonating with the audience and making him an aspirational role model and heroic figure of the era.

== Public image ==
Deol is commonly addressed as "Sunny Paaji", signifying the term 'elder brother'. Deol is known for being a humble, shy, and gentle person, who values his privacy and does not socialize much. He is also seen as a passionate, loyal, and dedicated actor, who works hard and does not compromise on his beliefs. His father characterised him as "painfully introverted" and lamented that he remains very distant despite his capacity for love. Deol is often absent from industry parties and events. In an interview with NDTV, he explained that, early in his career, he was labelled as "snooty and snobbish". However, as people got to know him, they realised that his aloofness was simply due to shyness. Over time, invitations dwindled because people understood that he was unlikely to attend. He is also particularly known for his extreme shyness around his female co-stars.

Deol is regarded for his punctuality and discipline on set. He has worked with several debutant directors throughout his career, including Rahul Rawail in Betaab (1983), Rajkumar Santoshi in Ghayal (1990), and N. Maharajan in Indian (2001). In 2005, he played a pivotal role in launching Imtiaz Ali's directorial career with Socha Na Tha. Following a meeting with Deol, who agreed to review Ali's script and produce the film, the project was greenlit. Reflecting on this significant moment, Ali stated, "He didn't ask me where I was from or about my experience. He holds a significant place in my life because he gave me my first film."

Indian actor Gaurav Chopra praised Deol, "He is everything that you've known him to be over so many years. He is not very talkative on the set, but it takes you 5 minutes to understand that he likes to keep it simple. He likes to keep his life and his presence grounded. Not just him, his entire staff, his entire aura, his entire presence on the set is grounded." Actress Priyanka Chopra made her Bollywood debut alongside Deol and recalled being incredibly nervous and "shaking" when she first met him. Despite rumours about her acting skills and talks of replacing her, Deol saw her potential and insisted on giving her a chance.

In recent years, he has been vocal about the bias and negativity he faced from the industry after the success of his film Gadar. He said that he was not offered any good scripts and that many of his contemporaries were jealous of his success.

=== Controversies ===
Deol starred in the Yash Chopra-directed Darr (1993), where he played the protagonist opposite Shah Rukh Khan. Darr was one of the most anticipated films of 1993 due to it being the first collaboration between Deol and Chopra, and recorded a bumper opening at the box office largely credited to Deol's role. Despite the film's commercial success, Deol felt betrayed and cheated by the director, who he accused of glorifying the villain and sidelining the hero. He claimed that the final version differed significantly from what was initially conveyed to him, with edited scenes that he was not informed about. He had a heated argument with Chopra over the climax of the film, during which he ripped his pants in anger. Although over the years, this act has been praised as a feat of strength, since Deol had his hands stuffed in his pockets and ripped his jeans all the way down in a fit of anger. The argument centred on a scene where Khan's character stabs Deol's character from the front. Deol argued that this was illogical for the thriller narrative, as his character is a trained marine commando and would only be vulnerable to such an attack if he were distracted or not looking at Khan. Khan, however, refused to stab Deol from the back, stating he is not a typical villain like Shakti Kapoor or Prem Chopra, who would resort to cowardly backstabbing. The film's action director, Tinu Verma, later revealed that a substitute scene was eventually filmed, and he spent the night editing the footage to fit Chopra's vision without Deol's knowledge. After the release of the film, he vowed to never work with Chopra again. Subsequently, he did not speak to Khan for 16 years, but he admitted that it was not deliberate. Since then, Deol and Khan have reconciled.

Deol faced a boycott by the farmers of Punjab, who were protesting against the farm laws passed by the central government in 2020. Deol, as a BJP MP from Gurdaspur constituency of Punjab, was seen as a supporter of the government and a betrayer of the farmers. He was also accused of being silent and inactive on the issue, and of not raising the voice of his constituents in the parliament. He later backed the new farm laws which led to the farmers also burning his effigies and posters, and refusing to watch his films.

== Bibliography ==
- Kumool, Abbi (13 October 2020). Sunny Deol’s star persona: Constructions of caste, class, religious, and regional identities among Jat-Sikhs and ---. Taylor & Francis.
- Mazumdar, Ranjani (2007). Bombay Cinema: An Archive of the City. University of Minnesota Press. ISBN 978-0-816-64942-6.
- Gupta, Rajesh Kumar (18 December 2021). Milan. Booksclinic Publishing. ISBN 978-9-355-35176-0.
- Gulazāra; Nihalani, Govind; Chatterjee, Saibal (2003). Encyclopaedia of Hindi Cinema. Popular Prakashan. ISBN 978-8-179-91066-5.
- Vijayakar, Rajiv (2018). Dharmendra: Not Just a He-Man. Rupa Publications. ISBN 978-9-353-33298-3.
- Pyarelal, Vijay Kumar (2024). A Dream Come True – Dharmendra. BlueRose Publishers. ISBN 978-9-356-11410-4.
- Gupta, Rajesh Kumar (14 January 2022). Aastha. Booksclinic Publishing. ISBN 978-9-355-35284-2.
