= Rahul Rawail =

Film director

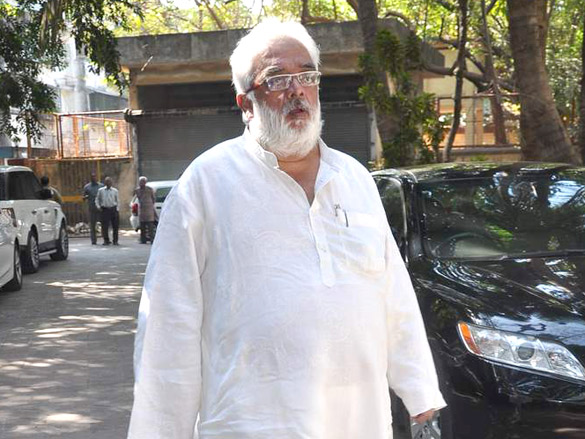
- Born: 7 April 1952 (age 74)
- Occupation: Film director
- Years active: 1968–2007
- Notable work: Love Story; Betaab; Arjun; Dacait; Aur Pyaar Ho Gaya; Arjun Pandit
- Children: Bharat Rawail; Shiv Rawail
- Father: H. S. Rawail
- Relatives: Rajat Rawail (nephew)

Rahul Rawail is an Indian former film director and editor in Hindi cinema known for his films like Love Story (1981), Betaab (1983), Arjun (1985), Dacait (1987), Yodha (1991), Anjaam (1994), Aur Pyaar Ho Gaya (1997), Arjun Pandit (1999) and Jo Bole So Nihaal (2005). He received nominations for the Filmfare Award for Best Director for Betaab and Arjun. He is the son of renowned film director H. S. Rawail. Rawail has launched a few of the Bollywood actors through his films like Kumar Gaurav and Vijayeta Pandit in Love Story, Sunny Deol and Amrita Singh in Betaab, Kajol in Bekhudi (1992), and Aishwarya Rai in Aur Pyaar Ho Gaya (1997).

In his book "Raj Kapoor The Master at Work", he goes down memory lane to document his revered 'front row seat' as an assistant director to him, the immortal master of Indian cinema. The book is as told to Pranika Sharma. In English the book is published by Bloomsbury and in Hindi by Prabhat Prakashan.

== Career and personal life ==
Rahul Rawail is the son of film director Harnam Singh Rawail (often credited as H. S. Rawail) who is known for his films Mere Mehboob (1963), Sunghursh (1968), Mehboob Ki Mehndi (1971) and Laila Majnu (1976). Rawail paid tribute to his father's 1968 film Sunghursh by titling one of his films as Jeevan Ek Sanghursh (1990). Both his sons, Bharat and Shiv, are assistant directors; Bharat, who also works as a celebrity photographer, had assisted Yash Chopra for the film Jab Tak Hai Jaan (2012)., while Shiv made his directorial debut with the Netflix miniseries The Railway Men (2023).

Rawail began his career as assistant to Raj Kapoor and debuted as director with 1980 Bollywood film Gunehgaar starring Parveen Babi, Rishi Kapoor, Rajendra Kumar, and Asha Parekh. His first two films were not successful but his third film Love Story (1981) starring débutante Kumar Gaurav and Vijeta Pandit was a turning point for his career. The film was a musical love story and was a commercial success. Since then, Rawail has directed seventeen films and two television series. He has often collaborated with actor Sunny Deol who worked with Rawail on six of his films, including his debut film Betaab (1983) with Amrita Singh. The film was appreciated for Rawail's "breezy treatment" of the débutantes. Rawail launched two successful actresses of Bollywood, Kajol and Aishwarya Rai Bachchan, through his films Bekhudi (1992) and Aur Pyaar Ho Gaya (1997) respectively. Both the films did not do well commercially. He received nominations for the Filmfare Award for Best Director for his films Betaab (1983) and Arjun (1985).

In 2010, Rawail started an acting school in collaboration with the Stella Adler Studio of Acting, New York City. In spite of famous Bollywood personalities like Sunny Deol enrolling their children to the academy, it was shut down after 2 years in 2012. Rawail released his book "Master at Work" a biographical work written on his mentor Raj Kapoor at the 52nd International Film Festival of India in Goa in 2021. He has been appointed as Jury at the Moscow International Film Festival 2023.

== Filmography ==
Films
Year	Title
1980	Gunahgaar
1981	Biwi-O-Biwi
1981	Love Story
1983	Betaab
1985	Arjun
1986	Samundar
1987	Dacait
1990	Jeevan Ek Sanghursh
1991	Mast Kalandar
1991	Yodha
1992	Bekhudi
1994	Anjaam
1997	Aur Pyaar Ho Gaya
1999	Arjun Pandit
2001	Kuch Khatti Kuch Meethi
2005	Jo Bole So Nihaal
2007	Buddha Mar Gaya

TV series
Year	Title
1988	Dharam Yuddh
1988	Honee Ahonee

== Awards and nominations ==
Year	Award	Category	Film	Result
1984	Filmfare Awards	Best Director	Betaab	Nominated
1986	Filmfare Awards	Best Director	Arjun	Nominated
