= Ghatak (1996 film) =

1996 Indian film by Rajkumar Santoshi

- Theatrical release poster
- Directed by: Rajkumar Santoshi
- Screenplay by: Rajkumar Santoshi
- Dialogues by: Rajkumar Santoshi; Shyam Gupta
- Story by: Rajkumar Santoshi
- Produced by: Rajkumar Santoshi
- Starring: Sunny Deol; Meenakshi Seshadri; Danny Denzongpa; Amrish Puri; Mukesh Rishi; K. K. Raina
- Cinematography: Ishwar Bidri
- Edited by: V. N. Mayekar
- Music by: Score: Vanraj Bhatia; Songs: R. D. Burman; Anu Malik
- Production company: Santoshi Productions
- Distributed by: Bharat Shah
- Release date: 15 November 1996
- Running time: 158 minutes
- Country: India
- Language: Hindi
- Budget: ₹6.25 crore
- Box office: est. ₹32.7 crore

Ghatak (transl. Lethal or Fatal) is a 1996 Indian Hindi-language vigilante action film written and directed by Rajkumar Santoshi. The film stars Sunny Deol, Meenakshi Seshadri, Danny Denzongpa, and Amrish Puri.

The film was released on 15 November 1996, and was a blockbuster, grossing ₹32.7 crore at the box-office to become the highest-grossing Hindi film of the year. It won three awards at the 42nd Filmfare Awards: Best Supporting Actor (Puri), Best Screenplay (Santoshi), and Best Editing (Mayekar). It also received three nominations: Best Director (Santoshi), Best Actor (Deol), and Best Villain (Denzongpa). The film was remade in Telugu as Aapthudu (2004), starring Rajasekhar and Anjala Zaveri.

== Plot ==
Kashi Nath is a kind-hearted wrestler and the dutiful adopted son of Shambhu Nath, living in Banaras. Shambhu Nath, who was a freedom fighter awarded with the Tambra Patra, is an honourable and respectable man in town. Kashi, along with Shambhu, comes to Mumbai for medical treatment for Shambhu and stays with his elder brother, Shiv Nath. Kashi meets Gauri in Mumbai and starts liking her. He learns that the locality is being terrorized by the tyrannical gangster, Katya, along with his six brothers. Before Kashi's arrival, a resident named Sachdev tried to initiate a revolt against Katya, but got ruthlessly killed by him, thereby making Malti, Sachdev's widow, go mad. Katya and his brothers become enemies with Kashi when he beats up their goons when they were roughing up Malti.

Shambhu is later diagnosed with terminal throat cancer and only has a few days to live. When Kashi refuses to join Katya's gang, Katya becomes furious and humiliates Shambhu before the entire locality, by making him bark like a dog. After a series of dramatic events, Shiv is run over to death by Jeena, one of Katya's brothers. In retaliation, Kashi then kills Antya, another one of Katya's brothers, and gets arrested. Meanwhile, Shambhu passes away. When Kashi tries to disperse his father's ashes at the Ghat with the police, the police van gets attacked by Katya's brothers and goons. Kashi kills all of them, including Katya's three brothers, and reaches Katya's home. There he kills Jeena, thereby causing only two brothers to survive, including Katya; however, Kashi is captured in the process.

As Katya had Shambhu bark like a dog, he tries to make Kashi behave like an ox in front of the locality, to re-establish his supremacy. Gauri however stands up, arousing the audience to attack as well. Kashi frees himself from the shackles and beats Katya to death. Katya's entire gang is attacked by the residents of the locality. Katya's sixth and the last remaining brother, Bhiku, is killed by the mob. For retribution, Kashi makes Katya bark like a dog just like Shambhu. He then kills him in front of the residents, but loses control over himself as he keeps beating Katya's corpse. His nephew then brings him Shambhu's ashes from crematory rites which brings him back to senses. The ending is a bittersweet one, where Kashi loses every one he loved, but the locality has its freedom at last.

== Cast ==
- Sunny Deol as Kashi Nath
- Meenakshi Seshadri as Gauri, Kashi's girlfriend
- Danny Denzongpa as Katya
- Amrish Puri as Shambu Nath, Kashi's adoptive father
- Mukesh Rishi as Jeena, Katya's brother
- K. K. Raina as Shiv Nath, Kashi's adoptive elder brother
- Om Puri as Sachdev
- Aanjjan Srivastav as Dhamu Kaka
- Tinnu Anand as Police Inspector
- Viju Khote as Pinto
- Harish Patel as Katya's brother-in-law
- Suresh Bhagwat as Gopal
- Rohini Hattangadi as Savitri
- Ila Arun as Malti Sachdev
- Sheela Sharma as Sheela Shiv Nath
- Navni Parihar as Gauri's sister
- Tinu Verma as Bhiku, Katya's brother
- Deep Dhillon as Antya, Katya's brother
- Brij Gopal as Katya's brother
- Mukhtar Khan as Katya's brother
- Ranjeev Verma as Katya's brother
- Makarand Deshpande as Katya's goon
- Ponnambalam as Ring Fighter
- Shiva Rindani as Chandru
- Mamta Kulkarni as dancer in the song "Koi Aaye Toh Le Jaye" (special appearance)
- Ganesh Acharya as the dancer in the song "Koi Aaye Toh Le Jaye" (special appearance)
- Amitabh Bachchan as Himself (cameo appearance)

== Production ==
Kamal Haasan was originally signed to play the lead role and an advertisement was commissioned to appear in a Screen magazine noting "Welcome back to the Hindi screen", pointing at the actor's return to Hindi films after 1985's Dekha Pyaar Tumhara. However, due to no producer willing to back the actor in the film, Rajkumar Santoshi changed the star cast.

Raveena Tandon was originally cast in the female lead role, but she withdrew from the film shortly after beginning filming.

== Soundtrack ==
The background score of the film was composed by Vanraj Bhatia. The music for all but one song was composed by R. D. Burman. Only one song "Koi Jaye To Le Aaye" was composed by Anu Malik. The lyrics were penned by Majrooh Sultanpuri and Rahat Indori. The song "Koi Jaye To Le Aaye" was remade as "Dil Dil Dil" in the 2025 Hindi feature film Ek Deewane Ki Deewaniyat.

Ghatak

Soundtrack album by R. D. Burman, Anu Malik and Vanraj Bhatia
- Released: 20 October 1996
- Genre: Feature film soundtrack
- Label: Venus Records & Tapes

Title	Singer(s)	Music	Lyricist	Length
"Nigahon Ne Chheda"	Suresh Wadkar, Sadhana Sargam	R.D. Burman	Majrooh Sultanpuri	06:24
"Badan Mein Chandni"	Kavita Krishnamurthy	R.D. Burman	Majrooh Sultanpuri	05:55
"Aaki Naaki"	Asha Bhosle	R.D. Burman	Majrooh Sultanpuri	08:57
"Ek Dil Ki Diwani"	Suresh Wadkar, Sadhana Sargam	R.D. Burman	Majrooh Sultanpuri	07:29
"Koi Jaye To Le Aaye"	Alka Yagnik, Shankar Mahadevan	Anu Malik	Rahat Indori	05:18
"Theme of Ghatak"	(Instrumental)	Vanraj Bhatia	–	02:28

== Awards and nominations ==
=== 42nd Filmfare Awards ===
==== Won ====
- Best Supporting Actor – Amrish Puri
- Best Screenplay – Rajkumar Santoshi
- Best Editing – V. N. Mayekar

==== Nominated ====
- Best Director – Rajkumar Santoshi
- Best Actor – Sunny Deol
- Best Villain – Danny Denzongpa

=== Screen Awards ===
==== Won ====
- Best Supporting Actor – Amrish Puri

== Re-release ==
This film was re-released on 21 March 2025, after 28 years at the Red Lorry Film Festival.
