= Jeet (1996 film) =

1996 Indian film by Raj Kanwar

- Theatrical release poster
- Directed by: Raj Kanwar
- Screenplay by: Raj Kanwar
- Dialogues by: Amrik Gill
- Story by: Raj Kanwar
- Produced by: Sajid Nadiadwala
- Starring: Sunny Deol; Salman Khan; Karisma Kapoor; Tabu; Amrish Puri
- Cinematography: A. Muthu
- Edited by: Harmeet Singh
- Music by: Score: Koti; Songs: Nadeem–Shravan
- Production company: Nadiadwala Grandson Entertainment
- Distributed by: Sony Pictures; Tips Industries
- Release date: 23 August 1996
- Running time: 164 minutes
- Country: India
- Language: Hindi
- Budget: ₹5.60 crore
- Box office: ₹30.5 crore

Jeet (transl. Victory) is a 1996 Indian Hindi-language romantic action film written and directed by Raj Kanwar and produced by Sajid Nadiadwala under Nadiadwala Grandson Entertainment. The film stars Sunny Deol, Salman Khan, Karisma Kapoor, Tabu, and Amrish Puri.

Released on 23 August 1996, Jeet was blockbuster at the box office. With a production budget of ₹5.6 crore, it earned ₹30.5 crore worldwide, becoming one of the highest-grossing Hindi films of 1996. The film was remade in Dhallywood as Laal Badshah (1999).

== Plot ==
Kajal Sharma is the daughter of Professor Sidhant Sharma. On the other end of the spectrum, Karan is a criminal working for Gajraj Chaudhry. The film starts with Gajraj ordering Karan to kill a journalist for writing negative things about him, which Karan dutifully does - by chasing him outside and catches him inside a marketplace full of people (including Kajal and her father). Kajal's father reports the crime. Karan finds out and breaks into Kajal and Sidhant's home - presumably to kill Sidhant - and starts beating him up. In a desperate attempt to get him to stop, Kajal slaps Karan. They make eye contact, visibly entrancing him, and he leaves their home.

Karan goes to Tulsi, a courtesan who is in love with Karan. There, it is shown that he is unable to forget Kajal, or more specifically, her eyes. Karan starts stalking Kajal, and she starts getting creeped out. One day, as Kajal is leaving the temple, he corners her. Kajal feels disgraced and lashes out at him, criticizing his behavior, and saying that he feels simply lust for her. Karan feels disgusted by this and leaves.

Karan is shown to have a soft side when he saves a child - named Timepass - from being mistreated by customers at a bar. Being reminded of himself (in a flashback it is revealed Karan was an orphan and was forced into becoming a criminal), Karan decides to take the kid in, introducing himself to Timepass' friends and one of said friends give him food to eat.

The next time we see Kajal, she and some other women are travelling by a Bus (including Karan and Timepass). They get harassed, and Karan gets off from the seat to save them in the nick of time. Kajal, after seeing his courage and helpful nature, starts to fall for Karan. She befriends Timepass, from whom she gets to know more about Karan. She approaches him with the help of Timepass, and starts to meet him regularly. She realizes that he's had a tough life and had gone down the criminal path. With encouragement from Kajal, Karan leaves his criminal lifestyle behind to be with Kajal. When he tells Tulsi about him and Kajal, she is heartbroken but decides to remain his friend.

Raju is then introduced as the son of Sidhant's childhood friend Ramakant Sahay. He is portrayed as a happy-go-lucky person with a flirtatious nature. It's revealed that Ramakant and Sidhant had had a pact, wherein Kajal and Raju would get married when they come of age. Kajal finds out about this through her father. She promptly confesses her love for Karan and refuses to marry Raju. Sidhant suffers a major heart attack when he learns this. Kajal is compelled to marry Raju because of her father's health. Karan finds out about this and goes to Kajal's house to beg for her love, but Kajal rejects him and asks him to forget her.

Kajal marries Raju and lived happily with him (But Karan only knows that she is married to someone that he does not know all about.) Karan fails to prevent the marriage and continues his criminal lifestyle, crying in sadness.

Some time later, Kajal falls in love with Raju. They return to India after the honeymoon in the France, where Kajal finds out that she is pregnant after fainting when she overhears Raju and his father's argument about the illegal affairs of their business. She is unhappy that their child will grow up in a criminal environment. Raju admits that he did not know about his father's deeds, and he and Kajal decide to leave Ramakant's house to provide their child a safe environment to grow up in.

Gajraj then worries that Raju might become a danger to his business, and orders Karan to kill Raju. Karan travels to Raju's house to kill him. There he comes across Kajal and learns the truth, he decides to protect Raju at all costs for Kajal's sake.

One fateful day, Raju is attacked by some hitmen and is rescued by Karan, who takes Raju home. Raju wakes up from his unconscious state in the nick of time to overhear Kajal apologizing to Karan for how she treated him. Raju is understanding of their situation and respects Kajal's past love for Karan. He promises Karan that if their child turns out to be a boy, they'll name him after Karan.

Raju, Kajal and Karan are attacked by Gajraj's goons and Kajal goes into labour. Karan, noticing this, takes Raju and Kajal to Tulsi's place, asking for Tulsi's help in delivering the baby safely. The goons, with Gajraj in tow, chase them, forcing Karan and Raju to engage them in a fight with them. Towards the end of the fight, Gajraj is just about to shoot Raju when Karan steps in and takes the bullets himself. Timepass then gives Karan a gun, and he shoots Gajraj, killing him. Karan dies at the exact moment that Kajal gives birth to a boy. The film ends with Raju holding their son, whom Kajal calls out with the name 'Karan'.

== Cast ==
- Sunny Deol as Karan
- Sarman kushwaha as Time pass
- Salman Khan as Rajnath "Raju" Sahay
- Karishma Kapoor as Kajal Sharma – Karan’s girlfriend, eventually Rajnath’s wife
- Tabu as Tulsibai
- Amrish Puri as Gajraj – Rajnath’s maternal uncle
- Dalip Tahil as Ramakant "Rama" Sahay – Rajnath’s father
- Alok Nath as Prof. Sidhant Sharma – Kajal's father
- Ashish Vidyarthi as Inspector Pratap Vidyarthi
- Master Mohsin as Timepass
- Johnny Lever as Piajee
- Mohan Joshi as Pitambar
- Arun Bakshi as Prateek Sharma – Kajal's brother
- Deepak Shirke as Govardhan
- Rajeev Verma as Karan's friend
- Viju Khote as Advocate Hemant Sahay
- Shashi Kiran as Balraj Sahay
- Kuldeep Pawar as Krishnakant Sahay

== Music and soundtrack ==
The background score of the film was composed by Koti, while the music for the songs featured in the film were composed by Nadeem–Shravan. The lyrics of the songs were penned by Sameer.

Singers Kumar Sanu, Alka Yagnik, Udit Narayan, Kavita Krishnamurthy, Vinod Rathod, Sonu Nigam and Sadhana Sargam lent their voices. According to Box Office India, with around 2,500,000 units sold the soundtrack became the fourth highest-grossing album of the year. The song "Dil Ka Kya Karen Sahib" is based on Dil Pe Zakham Khate Hain, composed and sung by Nusrat Fateh Ali Khan, while the original song later reused by Shashwat Sachdev in the 2026 Bollywood-film Dhurandhar: The Revenge, titled "Jaan Se Guzarte Hain".

Jeet

Studio album by Nadeem-Shravan
- Released: 1996
- Genre: Feature film soundtrack
- Length: 54:35
- Label: Tips Music Films
- Producer: Nadeem-Shravan

Nadeem-Shravan chronology
Saajan Chale Sasural (1996)	Jeet (1996)	Raja Hindustani (1996)

#	Song	Singer(s)	Length
1	"Tu Dharti Pe Chaahe"	Kumar Sanu & Alka Yagnik	09:09
2	"Yaara O Yaara"	Vinod Rathod & Alka Yagnik	07:07
3	"Saanson Ka Chalna"	Udit Narayan & Alka Yagnik	07:22
4	"Abhi Saans Lene Ki Fursat Nahin Hai"	Sonu Nigam & Alka Yagnik	08:10
5	"Dil Ka Kya Karen Saheb"	Kavita Krishnamurthy	07:13
6	"Vadon Se Nahin"	Kumar Sanu & Sadhana Sargam	06:00
7	"Saajan Ghar Aana"	Udit Narayan & Alka Yagnik	08:15
8	"Yaara O Yaara" (Sad)	Vinod Rathod	01:23

== Box office ==
Made on a budget of ₹5.90 crore, Jeet earned a net collection of ₹16.13 crore. The worldwide gross of the film was ₹30.5 crore, making it a blockbuster. It became the 3rd highest grossing Bollywood film of 1996.

== Accolades ==
Star Screen Awards

- Best Actor - Sunny Deol (Nominated)

42nd Filmfare Awards

- Best Supporting Actor - Salman Khan (Nominated)
- Best Supporting Actress - Tabu (Nominated)
