= Arjun Pandit (1999 film) =

1999 Indian film by Rahul Rawail

- Theatrical release poster
- Directed by: Rahul Rawail
- Screenplay by: Sudhir Mishra; Shiv Subramaniam; Sandeep Varma
- Dialogues by: K. K. Singh
- Story by: Upendra Rao
- Based on: Om (Kannada film)
- Produced by: N. R. Pachisia
- Starring: Sunny Deol; Juhi Chawla; Mukesh Rishi; Ashish Vidyarthi; Saurabh Shukla; Veerendra Saxena; Annu Kapoor
- Cinematography: Nirmal Jani
- Music by: Songs: Dilip Sen–Sameer Sen; Score: Aadesh Shrivastava
- Production company: Ratan International
- Distributed by: T-Series
- Release date: 20 August 1999 (India)
- Running time: 148 minutes
- Country: India
- Language: Hindi
- Budget: ₹9.5 crore
- Box office: ₹20 crore

Arjun Pandit is a 1999 Indian Hindi-language epic gangster film directed by Rahul Rawail and produced by N. R. Pachisia. It stars Sunny Deol and Juhi Chawla.

The film is a remake of the 1995 Kannada-language film Om. The film is also remembered for its song Kudiyan Shehar Diyan, sung by Daler Mehndi and performed by Chawla. Upon release, the film was a box office success, grossing ₹20 crore against a production budget of ₹9.5 crore.

== Plot ==
Arjun Pandit, a Mumbai-based gangster, is obsessed with a model named Nisha. He has his men kidnap her to celebrate her birthday, but she declares she hates him. When she attempts to marry someone else, Pandit and his henchmen disrupt the wedding and kidnap her, only to let her go after a car chase. Meanwhile, Pandit's friend Shiva is captured during the chase and arrested, but is shot in police custody. He reveals that Pandit is not who he seems to be and begins to tell his backstory.

A flashback shows Pandit as Professor Arjun Dixit, a peaceful, God-fearing Sanskrit academician in a university in Haridwar. He fell in love with Nisha when she arrived in his town to research the Sanskrit language in the university. However, she despises his meekness when he refuses to stand up to Sanjay, the rogue son of a woman MLA, who bullies them both. Nisha challenges Arjun to prove his manliness by confronting Sanjay, which leads Arjun to publicly beat Sanjay black and blue. A vengeful Sanjay and his henchmen later attack Arjun while he is with Nisha. The ensuing fight nearly ends in Arjun's death before Nisha throws him a sword and tells him to use it. Arjun kills Sanjay, but when the police arrive, Nisha lies, claiming Arjun killed Sanjay as the latter was trying to apologize to her. Once Arjun is arrested, Nisha testifies against him and reveals she is the sister of Sangita Chopra, Arjun's former student who was raped by Sanjay and committed suicide because Arjun couldn't testify against Sanjay, who had threatened to kill Arjun's own sister. Arjun regrets his inaction and tries to apologize in vain. However, Sanjay's mother, who denounced her son's acts, secures Arjun’s release from prison for doing what was ultimately right. He then goes to Mumbai to meet Nisha. Along with Shiva, he goes to a concert to find Nisha, where he sees a man talking about her vulgarly and nearly beats him to death.

The man he beats turns out to be the brother of a powerful don named Raman Kaalia, the rival of another criminal named Haldiraam. Haldiraam gets the brother killed, and tells Arjun that Kaalia has burnt Nisha's home down, thus pitting Arjun and Kaalia against each other. Arjun attempts to kill Kaalia in a shootout; the attempt fails, but transforms Arjun into the ruthless gangster known as "Pandit."

Back in the present, as Shiva finishes narrating the backstory, he dies in police custody. The police arrest Haldiraam based on Shiva's statement but are forced to free him soon after. They decide to enlist Nisha's help to convince Arjun to become an approver, but she declines. Both the police and her photographer friend, Imran, blame her for transforming Arjun into Pandit.

Arjun tells Nisha that their marriage is fixed and she asks him to meet her in person. When Arjun meets her, she stabs him. But he survives. This enrages him and prompts him to kidnap her along with her younger brother. He threatens to kill the brother if she refuses to marry him, and Nisha finally gives in. Pandit then explains that just as he couldn't testify against Sanjay because the latter threatened his sister, Nisha had to marry him because he threatened her brother. Nisha realizes her wrongdoing and attempts suicide. Seeing this, Pandit also realizes his actions were wrong and decides to end their marriage.

Pandit takes Nisha and her father to Siddharth, the man she was initially going to marry, and convinces them to proceed with the wedding. Since he's also decided to renounce his life of crime, feeling purposeless without Nisha, he is attacked by Haldiraam's henchmen and Kaalia, who have now joined forces. This results in a violent shootout that moves to a railway yard, where Pandit eliminates the henchmen one-by-one and then Kaalia. Pandit learns he has been double-crossed by Haldiraam, while Nisha realizes her love for Pandit, who nearly kills Haldiraam. She convinces him not to, as she doesn't want to be widowed and intends to use Haldiraam as a witness to prove Pandit's innocence. Nisha apologizes and is forgiven by Arjun. They unite forever.

== Cast ==
- Sunny Deol as Professor Arjun Dixit / "Pandit" – Nisha's obsessive lover, later husband.
- Juhi Chawla as Nisha Chopra – Arjun's nemesis, later wife.
- Mukesh Rishi as Raman Kalia
- Ashish Vidyarthi as Haldiram
- Saurabh Shukla as Johnny, Pandit’s man
- Virendra Saxena as Hafiz, Pandit’s man
- Annu Kapoor as Dr. Imran, Nisha’s friend
- Shahbaz Khan as Sanjay Sharma
- Yashpal Sharma as Shiva, Arjun’s friend.
- Shashi Sharma as Minister
- Deepak Qazir as Mr. Chopra, Nisha's father.
- Vaibhavi Raut as Sangita Chopra, Nisha's elder sister. (special appearance)
- Sachin Khedekar as Dr. Siddharth
- Pallavi Kulkarni as Shilpa Dixit, Arjun's cousin.
- Aruna Sangal as Shilpa's mother, Arjun's aunt.
- Daler Mehndi as Singer and dancer – In the song ("Oye Hoye Ke Kudiyan Shaher Diyan")
- Ganesh Yadav as Police Inspector

== Music and soundtrack ==
The lyrics of the film’s songs were penned by Javed Akhtar and the music for the songs was composed by Dilip Sen–Sameer Sen. The background score of the movie was composed by Aadesh Shrivastava.

The song Kudiyan Sheher Diyan from the film was quite popular and was recreated again in the 2017 film Poster Boys.

#	Title	Singer(s)
1	"Oye Hoye Ke Kudiyan Shaher Diyan"	Daler Mehndi, Alka Yagnik
2	"O Priya"	Hariharan, Alka Yagnik
3	"O Priya"	Kumar Sanu, Alka Yagnik
4	"Gher Daar Ghagro"	Jaspinder Narula
5	"Pagal Pagal"	Lalit Sen
6	"Kahan Jaye Koi"	Preeti Uttam Singh, Shankar Mahadevan
7	"Pyar Ke Geet"	Abhijeet, Alka Yagnik
8	"Har Kadamm Par Koyi Kaatil"	Hariharan, Preeti Uttam Singh, Shankar Mahadevan

== Reception ==
Suparn Verma of Rediff.com wrote, ″Rawail, who displayed excellent cinematic sense in Arjun, does not highlight either his technical finesse or style in this film. The story outdated and the attempted twist in the tale does not work as it is in total variance Nisha's character and convictions.″

UP gangster Vikas Dubey was reported to be an ardent fan of this film. He was rumoured to have watched it over 100 times. Inspired by his love for this movie, he had earned the monicker Pandit.
