= Dillagi (1999 film) =

1999 Indian film by Sunny Deol

- Theatrical release poster
- Directed by: Sunny Deol
- Screenplay by: Sutanu Gupta
- Dialogues by: Sanjay Masoomm
- Story by: Sutanu Gupta
- Produced by: Sunny Deol
- Starring: Sunny Deol; Bobby Deol; Urmila Matondkar; Dara Singh; Zohra Sehgal; Preity Zinta (special appearance)
- Cinematography: Manmohan Singh; Jeeva; Sameer Arya
- Edited by: Keshav Naidu
- Music by: Score: Viju Shah; Songs: Jatin–Lalit; Shankar–Ehsaan–Loy; Sukhwinder Singh; Anand–Milind
- Production company: Vijayta Films
- Distributed by: Venus Worldwide Entertainment Ltd
- Release date: 19 November 1999
- Running time: 184 minutes
- Country: India
- Language: Hindi
- Budget: ₹14 crore
- Box office: ₹21.21 crore

Dillagi is a 1999 Indian Hindi-language romantic drama film directed by Sunny Deol in his directorial debut. The cast includes Sunny Deol, his real-life brother Bobby Deol and Urmila Matondkar, along with Dara Singh, and Zohra Sehgal with Preity Zinta in a special appearance. The film was released on 19 November 1999.

It is the first film in which Sunny Deol acted alongside his brother Bobby Deol.

== Plot ==
Ranveer and Rajveer are devoted brothers. They along with their family, leave their village in Punjab to move to Mumbai. Ranveer takes on the responsibility of looking after his younger brother. After some hardships Ranveer, along with his father, manages to turn everything around and their family becomes really wealthy. Rajveer, on the other hand, lives recklessly. The first scene of the movie shows Ranveer inaugurating a hotel and they have a party where Rajveer arrives later with his foreign girlfriend. They have a grandmother who takes care of them along with their father.

Shalini joins the same college as Rajveer. He starts to woo her as a joke but she falls in love with him. One night, Shalini confesses her love for Rajveer telling him she intends to marry him assuming the same on Rajveer's part, but he takes the proposal as a joke. This doesn't annoy Shalini at first as she had fallen for him truly.

She keeps talking about marriage but one day Rajveer goes berserk and tells her that he does not love her. He even shows up at Shalini's house (enraged because his friends told him they think he has fallen in love with Shalini) disrespecting her parents as well in the process. This crushes Shalini as she realises she had loved a wrong person. A college rival of Rajveer, jealous of Rajveer since he had a crush on Shalini, tries to beat up Rajveer with his hired goons. Ranveer learns of it and rushes over to Rajveer's aid. The college student and his goons attack Rajveer on the head with a weapon, but Ranveer arrives and saves Rajveer, they thrash the goons and Rajveer's college rival.

Prior to all this, Ranveer had caught a glimpse of Shalini at a traffic signal and fell in love with her. After seeing Shalini at a wedding, he discovers her identity. He sent a marriage proposal but she refused it claiming she loves someone else (Rajveer). Ranveer, heartbroken, accepts.

After the aforesaid event, Shalini meets Ranveer again and they both eventually fall in love, which Shalini accepts Ranveer's marriage proposal. Rajveer later realises his love for Shalini and confesses it in front of Ranveer (who is unaware that Rajveer's love interest is Shalini), who encourages him to propose to Shalini. By this time, Rajveer and Ranveer had no idea that they are talking about the same woman.

When he shows up and confesses his love, Shalini very politely refuses. He feels broken and vows to kill that person (unaware it is Ranveer). Later, he sees Ranveer with Shalini in a restaurant and in anger behaves very rudely with Ranveer. Ranveer slaps Rajveer and Rajveer pushes him away, leaving both Ranveer and Shalini shocked. Rajveer then runs and attempts suicide by jumping off a bridge. Ranveer rushes behind him, to save him, but is hit by a car and goes into a coma. Shalini lashes out at Rajveer because, due to him, so many people were troubled.

Later, in an emotional scene, Rajveer apologises to Ranveer and he wakes up from his coma forgiving Rajveer. Shalini and Ranveer get married.

The film ends with Rajveer going back to his village, meeting Rani and falling for her.

== Cast ==
- Sunny Deol as Ranveer Singh
- Bobby Deol as Rajveer Singh / Rocky
- Urmila Matondkar as Shalini
- Preity Zinta as Rani (special appearance)
- Dara Singh as Veer Singh – Ranveer and Rajveer's father
- Zohra Sehgal as Mrs. Singh – Ranveer and Rajveer's grandmother
- Kulbhushan Kharbanda as Shalini's father
- Reema Lagoo as Shalini's mother
- Sushmita Mukherjee
- Parvin Dabas as Sameer
- Raj Zutshi as Nikhil
- Jasbir Thandi as Vikram
- Raj Kumar Kapoor
- Narinder Kaur
- Deepshikha Nagpal
- Tora Khasgir
- Dimple Inamdar
- Pervinder Gujral
- Goldy Choudhary
- Shefali Ganguly
- Kanika Shivpuri
- Rajshree Solanki
- Alistair Woodham
- Raspal Virdee
- Colonel Raj Kapoor

== Music ==
The music for the songs was composed by Jatin–Lalit, Shankar–Ehsaan–Loy, Sukhwinder Singh and Anand–Milind. The lyrics of the songs were penned by Javed Akhtar, Tejpal Kaur and Sukhwinder Singh.

The background score of the film was done by Viju Shah.

The music had a compilation of singers including Mahendra Kapoor, Abhijeet, Kumar Sanu, Amit Kumar, Udit Narayan, Sonu Nigam, Roop Kumar Rathod, Sukhwinder Singh, Shankar Mahadevan, Shaan, Kavita Krishnamurthy, Alka Yagnik, Jaspinder Narula, Mahalaxmi Iyer, Mohini Brahmbhatt and Nusrat Fateh Ali Khan.

Sukanya Verma of Rediff.com wrote, "In a nutshell, Dillagi's music is far from extraordinary. The title track shows promise, but the rest don't live up to it".

Dillagi

Soundtrack album by Sukhwinder Singh Jatin Lalit Anand Milind Shankar–Ehsaan–Loy
- Released: 27 September 1999
- Genre: Feature film soundtrack
- Label: Venus Records & Tapes

dillagi soundtrack

| Title | Music | Singer(s) | Lyricist(s) |
|---|---|---|---|
| "Dillagi Dillagi" | Shankar–Ehsaan–Loy | Kavita Krishnamurthy, Alka Yagnik, Abhijeet, Udit Narayan, Sonu Nigam, Sukhwinder Singh, Shankar Mahadevan, Shaan, Jaspinder Narula, Mahalaxmi Iyer | Javed Akhtar |
| "Dhoom Dhoom Luck Luck" | Sukhwinder Singh | Mahendra Kapoor, Sukhwinder Singh, Shankar Mahadevan, Mohini Brahmbhatt | Tejpal Kaur |
| "Kya Yeh Sach Hai" | Shankar–Ehsaan–Loy | Mahalaxmi Iyer, Shankar Mahadevan | Javed Akhtar |
| "Koi Nahin Aisa Ki Jo Mujhko" | Jatin–Lalit | Amit Kumar, Alka Yagnik | Javed Akhtar |
| "Main Kya Karoon" | Jatin–Lalit | Kumar Sanu | Javed Akhtar |
| "Yeh Zameen Hai" | Jatin–Lalit | Roop Kumar Rathod | Javed Akhtar |
| "Rahon Mein Chhayee" | Shankar–Ehsaan–Loy | Udit Narayan, Shankar Mahadevan, Alka Yagnik | Javed Akhtar |
| "Haan Haan Yeh Pyar Hai" | Jatin–Lalit | Abhijeet | Javed Akhtar |
| "Tanhai" | Anand–Milind | Nusrat Fateh Ali Khan | Javed Akhtar |
| "Sangeet" | Sukhwinder Singh | Jaspinder Narula, Dilraj Kaur | Tejpal Kaur |

== Reception ==
Suparn Verma of Rediff.com wrote, "He [Sunny Deol] does a competent job, making the film simple and pleasant. However, what lets him down is a contrived and cliched storyline".
