= Dacait =

1987 Hindi film by Rahul Rawail

- Theatrical release poster
- Directed by: Rahul Rawail
- Written by: Javed Akhtar
- Produced by: Rahul Rawail
- Starring: Sunny Deol; Meenakshi Sheshadri; Urmila Matondkar; Rakhee Gulzar; Shafi Inamdar; Suresh Oberoi; Paresh Rawal; Raza Murad; Anita Kanwar; Raj Nanvag; Satyajeet Puri; Dan Dhanoa
- Cinematography: Rajan Kothari
- Edited by: Rahul Rawail
- Music by: R. D. Burman
- Production company: Rahul Theatres International
- Distributed by: Ultra Distributors
- Release date: 10 April 1987
- Country: India

Dacait (transl. Dacoit) is a 1987 Indian epic dacoit western film, produced and directed by Rahul Rawail. The film stars Sunny Deol, Meenakshi Sheshadri, Urmila Matondkar, Rakhee Gulzar, Shafi Inamdar, Suresh Oberoi, Paresh Rawal and Raza Murad.

The story of the film was written by Javed Akhtar and the music was composed by R.D. Burman.

== Plot ==
The story is a powerful exploration of how a simple, educated man is driven to a life of banditry by the oppressive and corrupt forces.

Arjun Yadav, is a young man who returns to his village after completing his education in the city. He is in love with a young girl, Chavli, who works as a fisherwoman on the Chambal river. He is a pacifist who believes in justice, peace and social equality. However, he finds his village under the tyrannical control of the ruthless landlord Thakur Bhanwar Singh and a corrupt police officer, Inspector Vishnu Pandey. Thakur and his men oppress the local farmers, grabbing their lands and terrorizing their families with the help of the police.

Arjun tries to peacefully resolve the conflicts between the villagers and Thakur, but his efforts are met with hostility and deceit. Thakur pretends to agree to a peaceful solution but then launches a brutal attack on the village during a festival. The attack is a turning point for Arjun. He witnesses the murder of his elder brother, Amrit Lal, and the brutal assault and death of his younger sister, Shanta, right in front of him. He is beaten and left for dead, and his mother, Devi Chaudhrain, goes into a state of shock, losing her sanity.

Left with nothing and having lost his faith in the justice system, Arjun is rescued by some villagers who have also been wronged by Thakur. They take him to the Chambal ravines, where he meets his childhood friend, Maakhan Mallaah, who had become a dacoit due to similar circumstances. Realizing that the only way to seek justice and avenge his family is to fight fire with fire, Arjun transforms from a peaceful man into a Dacait (Dacoit).

The rest of the film follows Arjun's journey as a dacoit, now known as "The Dreaded Dacait," as he relentlessly pursues his revenge against Thakur Bhanwar Singh and Inspector Vishnu Pandey. The film is a gritty and realistic portrayal of the violence and desperation that drives ordinary people to become outlaws. It highlights the systemic corruption and oppression that existed in the rural areas of India, showing how a person's fate can be sealed by the injustice of the powerful. The story is a revenge saga, but with a social message, emphasizing that dacoits are not born, but are a product of their circumstances.

== Cast ==
- Sunny Deol as Arjun Yadav
- Meenakshi Sheshadri as Chavli – Arjun’s girlfriend, later wife
- Urmila Matondkar as Shanta Yadav – Arjun’s younger sister
- Raakhee Gulzar as Devi Chaudhrain – Arjun’s mother
- Suresh Oberoi as Amrit Lal Yadav – Arjun’s elder brother
- Paresh Rawal as Inspector Vishnu Pandey
- Raza Murad as Thakur Bhanwar Singh
- Shafi Inamdar as SP Shrivastav
- Satyajeet Puri as Ahmad – Arjun’s friend
- Raj Nanvag as Maakhan Mallaah – Arjun’s friend
- Dan Dhanoa as Thakur Badri Singh – Bhanwar's younger brother
- Anita Kanwar as Dr. Geeta
- Dilshad as Amrit's wife
- Harish Patel as Tolaram
- A. K. Hangal as Bighu chacha
- Swapna

== Music and soundtrack ==
The music of the film was composed by R. D. Burman and the lyrics of the songs were penned by Anand Bakshi.

#	Song	Singer
1	"Gaon Mein Mach Gaya Shor, O Saathi, Gali Mein Baj Gaya Dhol"	Kishore Kumar, Asha Bhosle, Suresh Wadkar
2	"Maine Kaha, Tumne Suna, Yeh Hawa Kehti Hai Kya"	Asha Bhosle, Suresh Wadkar
3	"Kis Kaaran Naiya Doli, Kis Kaaran Naiya Doli"	Asha Bhosle, Suresh Wadkar
4	"Woh Teri Duniya Nahin"	Lata Mangeshkar
5	"Mere Yaar Ko Mere Allah"	Shabbir Kumar
6	"Tandav Dance Music"	R. D. Burman
