= The Hero: Love Story of a Spy =

2003 film by Anil Sharma

- Theatrical release poster
- Directed by: Anil Sharma
- Written by: Shaktimaan Talwar
- Produced by: Dhirajlal Shah; Hasmukh Shah; Pravin Shah
- Starring: Sunny Deol; Preity Zinta; Priyanka Chopra; Amrish Puri; Kabir Bedi; Shahbaz Khan; Rajpal Yadav
- Narrated by: Sunny Deol
- Cinematography: Kabir Lal
- Edited by: Suresh Urs
- Music by: Songs: Uttam Singh; Score: Gurmeet Singh
- Production company: Time Magnetics Pvt. Ltd.
- Distributed by: Time Magnetics Pvt. Ltd.
- Release date: 11 April 2003
- Running time: 183 minutes
- Country: India
- Language: Hindi
- Budget: ₹35 crore
- Box office: ₹45.13 crore

The Hero: Love Story of a Spy is a 2003 Indian Hindi-language spy thriller film directed by Anil Sharma and produced by Time Magnetics. It stars Sunny Deol, Preity Zinta, and Priyanka Chopra in her Hindi film debut. The film tells the story of an undercover Research and Analysis Wing (RAW) agent who must gather intelligence about cross-border terrorism, stop the terrorist responsible for it, and face separation from his fiancé.

Sharma had long contemplated making a spy film but felt this was not economically viable for the Indian market, as Indian films did not have sufficient budgets. He first planned a film about India's spy network set in the early 2000s but made the 2001 film Gadar: Ek Prem Katha, which became one of the highest-grossing Indian films of all time. Following the record-breaking success of that film, Sharma decided to make The Hero: Love Story of a Spy. The Shah brothers were engaged to produce the film, which was touted to have a large budget and scale, unlike previous Bollywood films. Aiming for high production values, a sizeable amount of money was spent on the film. Several large sets were created to give the film a feeling of grandeur, and international stunt experts were hired to coordinate action sequences new to Indian cinema. Principal photography was done at Indian locations, including Kullu and Manali, and in locations in Canada and Switzerland. Uttam Singh composed the soundtrack with lyrics written by Anand Bakshi and Javed Akhtar.

The film's production cost was high, with trades suggesting that it was the most expensive Indian film ever made at that point; this was the most talked-about aspect of the film. The Hero: Love Story of a Spy was released on 11 April 2003 to mixed to positive reviews from critics. It grossed over ₹451 million at the box office against a production and marketing budget of ₹350 million, becoming the third-highest-grossing film of the year. Chopra won the Stardust Award for Best Supporting Actress for her performance.

== Plot ==
Major Arun Khanna is an army intelligence officer working for the Indian Secret Service agency Research and Analysis Wing (RAW) who has been sent to the Indo-Pakistan border in Kashmir. Under the identity of Major Ravi Batra, he sets up a spy network to obtain information about Pakistani terrorist activities across the border. In a nearby village, he meets Reshma, an orphan. Reshma joins the network to help Batra, and they fall in love. He reluctantly sends her into Pakistan to work as an undercover maid in Colonel Hidayatulla's house. Hidayatulla is associated with ISI head Isaq Khan and terrorist Maulana Azhar.

Reshma begins passing information to Batra. Khan, Azhar, and a group of nuclear scientists meet Hidayatulla's house, where they reveal plans to make a nuclear bomb for a terrorist attack in Kashmir. Reshma is exposed; she escapes and is chased but is saved by Batra and returns to India. Batra proposes marriage. Their engagement ceremony is cut short when terrorists attack. Reshma goes missing after falling into the river, and Batra is presumed dead.

Batra realizes Khan and Azhar are responsible for the attack. He fakes his own death and plans to infiltrate their terrorist network. In disguise, he follows Khan and Azhar to Canada and discovers they are planning to create a nuclear bomb. Reshma is found alive on the Ravi River shore in Lahore, Pakistan, where she is rescued by Salman. She loses the ability to walk after learning about the deaths of Batra and her parents. Salman takes her to Canada for treatment under the care of doctor Shaheen Zakaria, the daughter of Muslim fundamentalist Mr. Zakaria, an associate of Khan. In a shopping mall, Reshma finds a muffler she had knitted for Batra, and realizes he is alive and in Canada.

Batra changes his identity to that of a nuclear scientist named Wahid. To infiltrate Zakaria's group, he wins Zakaria's trust and marries Shaheen. Reshma sees Batra as Wahid at his wedding with Shaheen and recognizes him. Batra tells Reshma they cannot be together because he is now married to Shaheen. Reshma is heartbroken and returns to India. Overhearing their conversation, Shaheen learns the truth and is heartbroken. Batra tells Shaheen the truth about her father, but she does not believe the news about her father's terrorist links.

Batra tricks the group into revealing the location of the bomb's parts, which have been kept at a high-altitude facility owned by Zakaria. The group reveals the codes to him, and he transmits a signal to the Canadian and Indian governments. Shaheen learns about the group's plan, exposing them. Khan learns about "Wahid's" true identity and attempts to kill him, but Batra survives. Soldiers arrive, forcing the terrorists toward a train station. They hijack a train and take the passengers hostage. Shaheen, on board, tries to disarm Khan, but he kills her. Before dying, she forgives Batra. Batra kills the other terrorists and Khan. He returns to Kashmir and reunites with Reshma.

== Cast ==
Credits adapted from Bollywood Hungama.

- Sunny Deol as
  - Major Arun Khanna (actual name)
  - Ajay Chakravarty (alias)
  - Major Ravi Batra (alias)
  - Wahid Khan (alias)
- Preity Zinta as Reshma
- Priyanka Chopra as Dr. Shaheen Zakaria Khan
- Kabir Bedi as Mr. Zakaria
- Amrish Puri as Isaq Khan
- Shahbaz Khan as Capt. Idris Wajahat Malik (Brigade of the Guards)
- Rajpal Yadav as Lt Sorab Dorjee (Ladakh Scouts)
- Parvin Dabas as Dr. Salman
- Deep Dhillon as Col Ashfaq Hidayatullah, Pakistani Army
- Pradeep Rawat as RAW Chief Vinay Kapoor
- Ashwini Kalsekar as RAW officer Nilima
- Shri Vallabh Vyas as Reshma's adoptive father
- Rajat Bedi as Wasim
- Arif Zakaria as Karimuddin
- Gene Snitsky as a Russian terrorist
- Big Guido as Lab's security guard

== Production ==
Director Anil Sharma had planned to make The Hero: Love Story of a Spy before the release of his blockbuster film Gadar: Ek Prem Katha (2001). Sharma said he wanted to make a spy film and had contemplated making a James Bond-esque film for a long time but realised Indian films did not have the budget needed to make a film on such a scale. Sharma then thought of making a film based on India's spy network and, unlike his last historical film, set it in the early 2000s. His idea was to make a family film with no sex and violence. After the success of Gadar: Ek Prem Katha, Sharma decided to make The Hero: Love Story of a Spy, which Shaktimaan had written. As part of his research for the film, Sharma interacted with Army personnel to understand the working methods of its intelligence section.

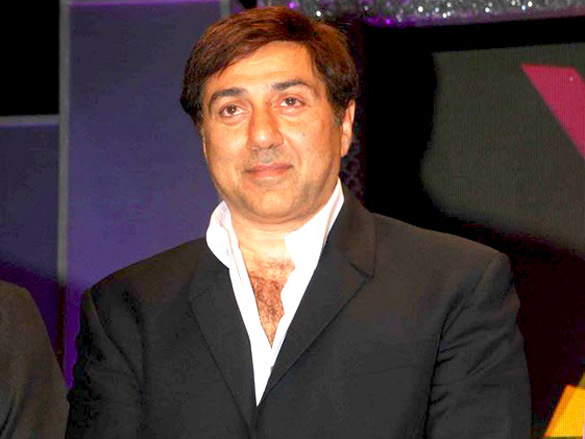
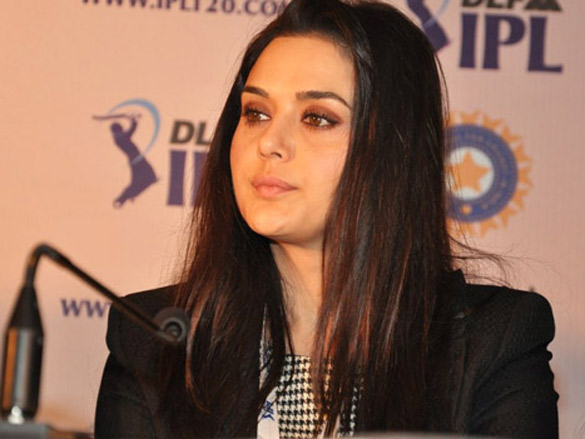
Sunny Deol (top) and Preity Zinta (bottom) were cast in the lead roles

The Shah brothers of Time Magnetics—Dhirajlal Shah, Hasmukh Shah, and Pravin Shah—were engaged to produce the film. Aiming for high production values, Sharma mounted the film on a sizable budget and the scale he said was needed for a story of this proportion. He said the film was a risk, especially when the Indian film industry was going through a slump. Sharma defended the budget, saying, "But everything is risky; even walking on the street is risky. I knew before I started how much it would cost. I think the two years I gave to the film are more important than the budget. The money may come back, the time won't. Films these days don't work because filmmakers don't give enough time to them."

Sharma cast Sunny Deol, who also starred in Gadar: Ek Prem Katha, in the role of an Indian spy. The director felt that the film differed greatly from their previous collaboration because Deol played a "subtle spy" who did not "scream and shout" (Deol's trademark in his films). Deol streaked his hair blond and wore several disguises in the film, which made him uncomfortable. Preity Zinta was cast in the female lead as a naive Kashmiri village girl, while Miss World 2000 Priyanka Chopra was cast in the supporting role of a Pakistani-born Canadian doctor. Zinta thought that the film had "a terrific script" and she identified with her character thanks to Zinta's Himachal Pradesh roots. Chopra thought the film had "a very emotional subject" and being a part of a big film like this seemed like a good option for her. Kabir Bedi and Amrish Puri completed the cast. Simple Kapadia, Abu Jani, Sandeep Khosla, Neeta Lulla and Sheetal India designed the cast's costumes. Sanjay Dhabade was the film's production designer. Several huge sets were constructed, including a massive glass house on water. Kabir Lal handled the cinematography.

Principal photography took place in Kullu and Manali in India with filming in Lonavala and Film City where half the film was shot. The rest half was filmed at locations in Canada and Switzerland. Filming in freezing weather in Canada and Switzerland proved to be difficult for the cast who had to be transported to rooms with heaters every five minutes. Sometimes, the temperatures fell to −20 °C (−4 °F). Allan Amin designed the action set pieces, and international action experts coordinated the stunts. In one of the "heavy duty" action scenes, eight helicopters were used in the filming. The film's producers cast professional wrestler Big Guido as Bedi's bodyguard for an action sequence. For one scene, Deol had to jump off an 11,000-foot (3,400 m) tall peak, which he felt was difficult. The climax of the film was shot at Jungfrau in temperatures of −16 °C (3 °F). To shoot the scene, Lal propped himself on top of an open helicopter to capture the Jaungfrau Heights from 15,000-foot (4,600 m) in −30 °C (−22 °F). The shot took two hours to film. After landing, he collapsed and was rushed to a hospital immediately. Ganesh Acharya choreographed the songs, and Suresh Urs edited the film.

=== Budget and trade analysis ===
After the record-breaking success of Deol's and Sharma's previous collaboration Gadar: Ek Prem Katha, which had become the highest-grossing Indian film of all time at that point, their next collaboration was highly anticipated and a lot was expected from it. According to Taran Adarsh, there were "gargantuan" expectations for the new film. The Hero: Love Story of a Spy was much talked about for its budget and scale. Adarsh said the producers had spared no expense in making it a film of "epic proportions" and "grand production values", writing, "The money spent is visible in every frame, the grand look of the film just cannot be overlooked." The film was also talked about for including stunts that were new to Bollywood cinema.

Industry experts and trade analysts declared The Hero: Love Story of a Spy the most expensive Indian film ever made at that point, with some estimating its budget as being between ₹500 and ₹600 million. According to Box Office India, the film had a budget of ₹350 million, including production and marketing costs. Sharma refused to confirm the exact budget but agreed it was an expensive film, telling Subhash K. Jha: "The producers have gone on record about the budget. I cannot tell you the exact cost. But yes, it is an expensive film." The director, however, was extremely unhappy with the hype around the film's budget because he did not want to raise audience expectations. Rajesh Thadani said the film should have been made on a lower budget because the economics of film-making had changed and that restraining a film's budget was "the need of the hour". A distributor told Rediff.com "making such a costly film in the 2000s was not a viable proposition and that audiences had become extremely unpredictable". He added: "Devdas, with all its hype, barely managed to recover its cost. For The Hero to succeed, it will have to do better than Devdas."

When The Hero: Love Story of a Spy was in production, the Hindi film industry's revenues were declining, and many were hopeful the film would help to revive the industry. The film's trailers and promos created "enormous" to "positive" buzz in the public and the media, but some trade analysts were skeptical about its high budget and its potential box-office earnings. An editor of Box Office India said the recovery of the cost of a film like this, filmed on "an extra-large canvas", was impossible from the Indian market alone. He said big-budget films like this mostly rely on overseas markets, which was uncertain for this film because it offered nothing new to overseas audiences as a "James Bond type of movie" that had been done several times before. Trade analyst Amod Mehra was more optimistic about the film, saying he hoped it would help revive the Bollywood film industry, which had "virtually gone dead", and that "the public is anticipating something as thrilling and fast-paced as Gadar. If he has kept the pulse of the public in mind, I see no reason why [the film] won't run well."

== Music and soundtrack ==
The Hero: Love Story of a Spy

Soundtrack album by Uttam Singh
- Released: 4 January 2003
- Genre: Feature film soundtrack
- Length: 33:47
- Language: Hindi
- Label: Times Music

Uttam Singh composed the music for the songs of The Hero: Love Story of a Spy and the lyrics were penned by Anand Bakshi and Javed Akhtar. Initially, Bakshi was signed as the sole lyricist for all the songs, but during production he fell ill. He wrote the lyrics for six of the total eight songs, but unfortunately died before finishing all. Akhtar pitched in to write the lyrics for the remaining two songs. The background score of the film was provided by Gurmeet Singh.

The film contains eight original tracks with vocals provided by Vital Signs, Udit Narayan, Alka Yagnik, Jaspinder Narula, Sunidhi Chauhan, Sardool Sikander and Hariharan. Times Music released the soundtrack on 4 January 2003.

Bollywood Hungama said the soundtrack did not have "anything great or extraordinary to offer" except for the song “Dil Main Hai Pyaar” and that the music is below expectations considering the lavish budget and scale of the film.

Track listing
No.	Title	Lyrics	Singer(s)	Length
1.	"Dil Main Hai Pyaar"	Anand Bakshi	Alka Yagnik, Jaspinder Narula, Udit Narayan	04:37
2.	"Tere Shehar Ka Kya Hai Naam"	Anand Bakshi	Udit Narayan, Alka Yagnik	04:25
3.	"In Mast Nigahon Se"	Javed Akhtar	Udit Narayan, Sunidhi Chauhan	05:02
4.	"Mari Koyal Ne Aisi Cook"	Anand Bakshi	Jaspinder Narula, Sardool Sikander	06:35
5.	"Tum Bhi Na Mano"	Javed Akhtar	Hariharan, Alka Yagnik	06:11
6.	"Dil Main Hai Pyaar 2"	Anand Bakshi	Alka Yagnik, Jaspinder Narula	06:57
7.	"Tu Hai"	Anand Bakshi	Vital Signs	05:21
8.	"Tu Hai 2"	Anand Bakshi	Vital Signs, Alka Yagnik & Sunidhi Chauhan	05:21

== Release ==
As The Hero: Love Story of a Spy neared its release, the 2003 Bollywood Producers' strike prevented the release of new Hindi films in theaters after 1 April 2003. Deol was unhappy about the strike because he felt postponing a big film like this was not an affordable option, saying: "When a producer has spent so much money promoting and publicising a film like The Hero, how is he expected to scrap his campaign, postpone his film and start from scratch?" The Hero: Love Story of a Spy was released on 11 April 2003 on 500 screens despite the ongoing ban on the release of Hindi films.

The film had a successful opening at the box office, collecting ₹22.2 million on its opening day and ₹63.1 million in its opening weekend in India with worldwide opening-weekend revenue of over ₹111.5 million. In its first week, the film collected over ₹107 million at the domestic box office and over ₹188.2 worldwide. In a report published in Rediff.com, Jha said the strike proved to be beneficial for The Hero: Love Story of a Spy because it had sustained a steady second-week run. During its box office run, the film grossed ₹414.5 million in India and over ₹36.8 million in the overseas market, making a worldwide gross of over ₹451.3 million. It was the third-highest-grossing Indian film of the year, but the film's box-office gross was considered to be below expectations due to high production costs.

Time released The Hero: Love Story of a Spy as a single-disc, NTSC-format DVD on 8 July 2003 across all regions. A DVD version released by Venus Records contains some bonus features, including a "making-of" documentary and a collection of Deol's songs. A Video CD version was released at the same time. Tip Top Video released the film internationally on an all-regions, PAL-Widescreen format DVD. A VHS version was released on 1 September 2003. Moser Baer later released another version of the DVD across all regions on an NTSC-format single disc.

== Reception ==
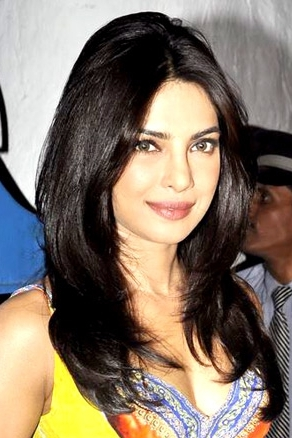
Miss World 2000 Priyanka Chopra made her Bollywood debut with the film, winning the Stardust Award for Best Supporting Actress for her performance

The Hero: Love Story of a Spy garnered mixed to positive reviews from critics. Deepa Gumaste of Rediff.com praised the film, calling it a "comic-book spy movie", comparing it to Die Another Day (2002) and Mission: Impossible (2000), and wrote, "At last an original desi spy who combines the guile and charm of James Bond and the raw appeal of Rambo!" She said the cinematography is a "treat for the eyes with exquisite footage of the picturesque landscapes" and wrote, "For once in a Hindi film, foreign locations have actually been put to good use." Lawrence Van Gelder of New York Times was appreciative of the film, noting its "multiple pleasures" and writing, "stretching from the snow-capped peaks of Kashmir to the ski slopes of Canada, mingling gunplay, spectacular explosions and chases with songs, dances and romance, this colorful Indian spy adventure constitutes the cinematic equivalent of the delightful and inconsequential escapism of a 700-page summer beach novel."

Sify gave The Hero: Love Story of a Spy film three out of five, writing, "The central theme gets more spice with a love story giving much role to play for Zinta and Chopra. The action sequences are well shot and Deol essays his role with his usual skill." Kevin Thomas of the Los Angeles Times called the film "straightforward escapist fare" with the sensibility of an "old-fashioned comic-book", and said it "may be corny" and "unintentionally amusing at times" but it is also "a lot of fun" and has "all the classic elements of a Bollywood blockbuster taken to a spectacular level". The BBC's Manish Gajjar called the film "great escapist" cinema and praised the performances, writing that, "the role of Ravi Khanna was tailor-made for Deol. He got a chance to exhibit the various looks of a secret agent ... Zinta is radiantly refreshing throughout the film, whilst ex-Miss World Chopra appears natural considering that this is her debut film."

Derek Elley of Variety said The Hero: Love Story of a Spy is "wildly over-the-top" but "undeniably entertaining". Praising the performances, Elley wrote, "Deol makes a solid, rather than exciting hero, better in military duds than his increasingly outre disguises, and Puri overacts wildly as the villain. The female leads are much more engaging, with Zinta typically sparky and likable, and mega-looker Chopra making a solid screen debut as a modern urban miss." Anupama Chopra of India Today said the narrative has flair, noting the love story, including the courtship and consequent separation that has "emotional vigour" works to some extent but the spying part is a problem. She wrote: "The leads try hard—Deol appears suavely sincere and Zinta, vulnerable—but Shaktimaan's script doesn't hold. The incendiary dialogue got whistles but the comic-book discussions on nuclear bombs were a sleeping pill." Taran Adarsh of Bollywood Hungama criticized the "superficial" writing but praised the technical aspects of the film, such as the "terrific" visuals and "awe-inspiring" action sequences, and said it "lacks the soul to make you cry and make your heart go out for the on-screen characters ... [the film] has gloss and hype as its trumpcards, but ... lacks in emotions, music and a taut screenplay".

== Accolades ==
Award	Date (Note: Linked to the article about the awards held that year, wherever possible.)	Category	Recipient(s) and nominee(s)	Result	Ref.
IIFA Awards	22 May 2004	Best Performance in a Negative Role	Amrish Puri	Nominated	
Screen Awards	16 January 2004	Best Action	Allan Amin	Nominated	
Stardust Awards	2004	Best Supporting Actress	Priyanka Chopra	Won	
Zee Cine Awards	26 February 2004	Best Performance in a Negative Role	Amrish Puri	Nominated	
Zee Cine Awards	26 February 2004	Best Female Debut	Priyanka Chopra	Nominated	
Zee Cine Awards	26 February 2004	Best Action	Allan Amin	Nominated	
Zee Cine Awards	26 February 2004	Best Visual Effects	The Hero: Love Story of a Spy	Nominated	
