= Gadar 2 (soundtrack) =

Gadar 2 (Original Motion Picture Soundtrack)
- Soundtrack album cover

Soundtrack album by Uttam Singh, Mithoon and Monty Sharma
- Released: 4 August 2023 (original); 8 September 2023 (extended)
- Recorded: 2022
- Genre: Motion Picture soundtrack, Filmi
- Length: 31:50 (initial); 1:04:25 (extended)
- Language: Hindi
- Label: Zee Music Company
- Producer: Mithoon; Monty Sharma
External audio
- Gadar 2 – Full Album on YouTube
- Gadar 2 – Extended Full Album on YouTube

Uttam Singh chronology
Nanak Shah Fakir (2015)	Gadar 2 (2023)

Mithoon chronology
Bawaal (2023)	Gadar 2 (2023)	Crakk (2024)

Monty Sharma chronology
Genius (2018)	Gadar 2 (2023)

Singles from Gadar 2
- 1. "Udd Jaa Kaale Kaava" Released: 29 June 2023; 2. "Khairiyat" Released: 9 July 2023; 3. "Main Nikla Gaddi Leke" Released: 20 July 2023

Gadar 2 is the soundtrack to the 2023 film of the same name directed and produced by Anil Sharma. A sequel to Sharma's Gadar: Ek Prem Katha (2001), the film stars Sunny Deol, Ameesha Patel and Utkarsh Sharma reprise their roles from the previous films. The starcast also introduces Simrat Kaur as one of the leads.

The soundtrack to the film features music composed and recreated by Mithoon and Monty Sharma, over the original music previously composed for a couple of songs by Uttam Singh (uncredited). The lyrics of the songs were penned by Sayeed Quadri and Sunil Sirvaiya, and a couple of old songs were used whose lyrics were previously penned by Anand Bakshi (uncredited).

The first album, which consisted seven songs was released by Zee Music Company on 4 August 2023. The extended soundtrack that featured alternates of other compositions and Monty Sharma's contributions to the film released on 8 September 2023.

== Development ==
Mithoon composed the six-song soundtrack to Gadar 2 while the background score is composed by Monty Sharma. According to Mithoon, the first film's historic success was attributed since "the emotions of the whole country are associated with it" and had huge responsibility to emulate the feel from the first film as recreations were not accepted among the current generation.

Vocals for Sunny Deol and Ameesha Patel are once again supplied by Udit Narayan and Alka Yagnik, respectively.

Mithoon recreated the songs "Udd Jaa Kaale Kaava" and "Main Nikla Gaddi Leke" from the first film, despite admitting to being against remakes. For the film, which covers Tara Singh (Deol) and Sakina's (Patel) life after 18 years he wanted to bring the nostalgic feel through the song, making the film as a proper sequel. The track "Main Nikla Gaddi Leke" was sung by the original singer Narayan along with his son Aditya Narayan. Mithoon initially added few pieces of his cues retaining the antara and intended to add more layers and voices but decided against doing so as "the innocence of it [the song] will go away".

Sayeed Quadri was brought in as the lyricist writing three songs "Khairyat", "Dil Jhoom" and "Chal Tere Ishq Mein"; Quadri's inclusion, according to Mithoon, was to basically use poetry of the early 1970s and felt Quadri would be the fit. The words "shokhi", "shararat", "nafasat" and "nazakat" were included in the lyrics, as they were popular during that time. The song "Sura Soi", sung by Sukhwinder Singh, was adapted from the poem written by Guru Granth Sahib.

== Track listing ==
Track listing
No.	Title	Lyrics	Music	Singer(s)	Length
1.	"Udd Jaa Kaale Kaava"	Anand Bakshi	Uttam Singh, Mithoon (recreation)	Udit Narayan, Alka Yagnik	4:48
2.	"Khairiyat"	Sayeed Quadri	Mithoon	Arijit Singh	3:50
3.	"Main Nikla Gaddi Leke"	Anand Bakshi	Uttam Singh, Mithoon (recreation)	Udit Narayan, Aditya Narayan	3:51
4.	"Dil Jhoom"	Sayeed Quadri	Mithoon	Arijit Singh	5:04
5.	"Sura Soi"	Guru Granth Sahib	Mithoon	Sukhwinder Singh	3:05
6.	"Chal Tere Ishq Mein"	Sayeed Quadri	Mithoon	Neeti Mohan, Vishal Mishra, Shehnaz Akhtar, Sahil Akhtar, Shadab Faridi, Altamash Faridi, Mithoon	6:11
7.	"Udd Jaa Kaale Kaava" (Climax Version)	Anand Bakshi	Uttam Singh, Mithoon (recreation)	Udit Narayan, Jubin Nautiyal	4:59
8.	"Udd Jaa Kaale Kaava" (Palak Mucchal)	Anand Bakshi	Uttam Singh, Mithoon (recreation)	Palak Muchhal	3:03
9.	"Chal Tere Ishq Mein" (Vishal Mishra)	Sayeed Quadri	Mithoon	Vishal Mishra	5:06
10.	"Khairiyat" (Sakshi Holkar)	Sayeed Quadri	Mithoon	Sakshi Holkar	2:47
11.	"Dil Jhoom" (Vishal Mishra)	Sayeed Quadri	Mithoon	Vishal Mishra	5:02
12.	"Tuk Tuk Tenu"	Sunil Sirvaiya	Monty Sharma	Asees Kaur	2:11
13.	"Bata De Sakhi"	Sunil Sirvaiya	Monty Sharma	Rekha Bhardwaj	3:13
14.	"Rabb Jeya Sohnaa"	Sunil Sirvaiya	Monty Sharma	Gaurav Chati	2:20
15.	"Babul"	Sunil Sirvaiya	Monty Sharma	Asees Kaur	3:02
16.	"Wasl Ki"	Sunil Sirvaiya	Monty Sharma	Suvarna Tiwari	2:50
17.	"Come Closer"	Kairvina Sharma	Monty Sharma	Kairvina Sharma	3:24
Total length:					1:04:25

== Release ==
Gadar 2's soundtrack preceded with three singles: "Udd Jaa Kaale Kaava" was the first to be released from the album on 29 June 2023. The song was sung by Udit Narayan and Alka Yagnik, who also crooned the original version. The second song "Khairiyat" performed by Arijit Singh was released on 9 July 2023. The third song "Main Nikla Gaddi Leke" was released on 20 July 2023. The soundtrack album featuring seven songs was released on 4 August 2023. An extended album that featured songs composed by Monty Sharma, along with alternates of the original tracks by various singers, released on 8 September 2023.

== Reception ==
Anish Mohanty of Planet Bollywood criticized the music, saying "the album fails to meet the expectations" and may work for fans of the original film. Anuj Kumar of The Hindu felt that he was "not disappointed" with the sequel's music but said it could not match with that of its predecessor. Joginder Tuteja of Bollywood Hungama wrote "Mithoon's music fails to work and is nowhere close to the outstanding music score of the first part." In contrast, The Times of India critic Renuka Vyahare called the music as one of the "redeeming factor". Kavya of Radio Mirchi praised the music as it "brings back the golden era".

== Controversy ==
Uttam Singh, who composed music for the predecessor claimed that two of his songs "Udd Jaa Kaale Kaava" and "Main Nikla Gaddi Leke" were recreated without his consent and criticized Anil Sharma regarding the same. Sharma replied to his claims saying that he showcased all the songs before working on the film, and he was not informed on his inclusion. Since Zee Entertainment Enterprises had the rights to the film (theatrical, satellite, digital and rights) as well as the predecessor, the permission to recreate those original songs was not necessary. But Sharma told the makers to consult Singh and ensure that he was given his credit.

However, Singh in a September 2023 interview refuted Sharma's claims, as he said that he was only informed about re-releasing the original film and was asked to rework the music which Uttam denied. However, a second meeting was held for finalizing the expenses to rework the music for the original film to fit the modern equipment, which failed after Zee Music Company were unsatisfied with the expenses. After the meeting, Sharma took Singh to the editing room and asked him to listen the untuned version of the song "Khairiyat" and left altering the tune, without further discussion on the sequel's music. He further claimed that Sharma was unethical over this issue. Sharma further reiterated this in an interview to The Indian Express adding that composers use reprised versions in several films, despite not getting permission from the original composers and he did the same for this film. He added that, he formally met Singh to end the controversy admitting that he was misquoted.
