= Gadar: Ek Prem Katha (soundtrack) =

Gadar: Ek Prem Katha (Original Motion Picture Soundtrack)
- Soundtrack album cover

Soundtrack album by Uttam Singh
- Released: 9 April 2001
- Recorded: 2000–2001
- Genre: Motion Picture soundtrack, Filmi
- Length: 38:19
- Label: Zee Records (Note: The rights to the film's music were later acquired by T-Series in 2009 after Zee Records being defunct, and later reverted back to Zee Entertainment Enterprises through its newly formed record label Zee Music Company which currently has its rights)
- Producer: Uttam Singh

Uttam Singh chronology
Farz (2001)	Gadar: Ek Prem Katha (Original Motion Picture Soundtrack) (2001)	Pyaar Diwana Hota Hai (2002)

Gadar: Ek Prem Katha is the soundtrack to the 2001 film of the same name directed and produced by Anil Sharma and stars Sunny Deol and Ameesha Patel. Released through Zee Records on 9 April 2001, the nine-song soundtrack features compositions from Uttam Singh with lyrics written by Anand Bakshi and features vocals by Udit Narayan, Alka Yagnik, Preeti Uttam Singh, Pandit Ajoy Chakrabarty, Parveen Sultana. The soundtrack was the fifth-highest selling soundtrack of India during the time of its release.

== Development ==
Gadar: Ek Prem Katha features five songs: "Udja Kale Kawan", "Musafir Jaane Wale", "Main Nikla Gaddi Leke", "Aan Milo Sajna" and "Hum Juda Ho Gaye", In addition, a traditional marriage song played in the background was also conceived for the soundtrack.

As the film was set before 1947, composing music for the film was "challenging" for Singh, as it has to cater the modern audience while being authentic to the storyline. "Udja Kale Kawan", according to Singh was the "hardest" song he had composed. He could not fix a particular tune in mind, and after a month he thought of a tune that lasts around 16–17 seconds. He then met Bakshi for developing a song within this tune and gave him a week's time, but eventually wrote the entire lyrics for the song in 3 days. The song has four different versions that appears in each situation. When the full song was composed, Yash Chopra's wife Pammi Chopra contacted Singh to check that if the song was adapted from a folklore or not, to which Singh replied that it was originally curated.

Udit Narayan and Alka Yagnik perform the vocals for Sunny Deol and Ameesha Patel, respectively. Lata Mangeshkar was the initial choice for the female vocals of "Udja Kale Kawan", according to Singh as she previously worked on Dil To Pagal Hai (1997), but due to Mangeshkar's unavailability as she was on a concert tour, Singh later brought Yagnik for the song. The thumri song "Aan Milo Sajna" was composed within fifteen minutes.

== Track listing ==
No.	Title	Singer(s)	Length
1.	"Udja Kale Kawan" (Folk)	Udit Narayan	03:11
2.	"Musafir Jaane Wale"	Udit Narayan, Preeti Uttam Singh	05:47
3.	"Main Nikla Gaddi Leke"	Udit Narayan	05:26
4.	"Udja Kale Kawan" (Marriage)	Udit Narayan, Alka Yagnik	05:01
5.	"Hum Juda Ho Gaye"	Udit Narayan, Preeti Uttam Singh	06:04
6.	"Udja Kale Kawan" (Search)	Udit Narayan, Alka Yagnik	04:34
7.	"Aan Milo Sajna"	Pandit Ajoy Chakrabarty, Parveen Sultana	05:22
8.	"Udja Kale Kawan" (Victory)	Chorus	01:20
9.	"Traditional Shaadi Geet"	Preeti Uttam Singh	01:30
Total length:			38:19

== Reception ==
Sukanya Verma of Rediff.com described the music as "unconventional" and not the "regular commercial fare" concluding "if you're of the hip crowd, you might not hop for Gadar". Writing for Bollywood Hungama, Taran Adarsh was more critical of the music describing as the "sore point" of the film, and "there is not one song that you recollect after the show has ended" excluding "Udja Kale Kawan" and "Hum Juda Ho Gaye" was "totally out of sync with the mood of the film". In the re-review for The Quint, Pankhuri Shukla stated "even after two decades, the Gadar soundtrack still slaps."

The soundtrack was the fifth-highest selling music album of India for the year with approximately 2.5 million copies being sold.

== Accolades ==
List of accolades received by Dil Chahta Hai
Award	Date of ceremony (Note: Date is linked to the article about the awards held that year, wherever possible.)	Category	Recipient(s)	Result	Ref.
Filmfare Awards	16 February 2002	Best Music Director	Uttam Singh	Nominated	
Filmfare Awards	16 February 2002	Best Lyricist	Anand Bakshi (for "Udja Kale Kawan")	Nominated	
Filmfare Awards	16 February 2002	Best Playback Singer – Male	Udit Narayan (for "Koi Kahe Kehta Rahe")	Nominated	
International Indian Film Academy Awards	6 April 2002	Best Music Director	Uttam Singh	Nominated	
International Indian Film Academy Awards	6 April 2002	Best Lyricist	Anand Bakshi (for "Udja Kale Kawan")	Nominated	
International Indian Film Academy Awards	6 April 2002	Best Playback Singer – Male	Udit Narayan (for "Udja Kale Kawan")	Nominated	
Screen Awards	18 January 2002	Best Music Director	Uttam Singh	Nominated	
Screen Awards	18 January 2002	Best Lyricist	Anand Bakshi (for "Udja Kale Kawan")	Nominated	
Screen Awards	18 January 2002	Best Playback Singer – Male	Udit Narayan (for "Udja Kale Kawan")	Nominated	
Zee Cine Awards	11 January 2002	Best Lyricist	Udit Narayan (for "Udja Kale Kawan")	Nominated	

== Use in sequel ==
The sequel to the film, titled Gadar 2 (2023) featured music composed by Mithoon who recreated two songs from the original—"Udja Kale Kawan" and "Main Nikla Gaddi Leke"; the former as "Udd Jaa Kaale Kaava". Singh criticised Sharma for reusing those songs without consent, though Sharma replied that the label Zee Music Company had owned the record rights to the franchise and therefore obtaining permission from the original artists were not necessary. But Sharma wanted Singh to be credited for the recreations as well. After formally contacting Singh, Sharma ended the controversy, saying the former was misquoted.
