= Vanvaas =

2024 Indian film by Anil Sharma

- Theatrical release poster
- Directed by: Anil Sharma
- Written by: Anil Sharma; Amjad Ali; Sunil Sirvaiya
- Produced by: Anil Sharma; Suman Sharma
- Starring: Nana Patekar; Utkarsh Sharma; Simrat Kaur; Khushbu Sundar
- Cinematography: Kabir Lal
- Edited by: Sanjay Sankla
- Music by: Mithoon; Monty Sharma
- Production companies: Zee Studios; Anil Sharma Productions
- Distributed by: Zee Studios
- Release date: 20 December 2024
- Running time: 159 minutes
- Country: India
- Language: Hindi
- Box office: est. ₹6.37 crore

Vanvaas (lit. Exile) is a 2024 Indian Hindi-language family drama film directed by Anil Sharma. The film stars Nana Patekar, Utkarsh Sharma Simrat Kaur, Rajpal Yadav, Khushbu Sundar, and Ashwini Kalsekar. It is written by Anil Sharma, Amjad Ali and Sunil Sirvaiya, and produced by Zee Studios and Anil Sharma Productions.

Vanvaas was theatrically released on 20 December 2024.

== Premise ==
After being abandoned by his sons, an elderly father grappling with dementia embarks on a life-changing journey. He is aided by a cunning thief who is determined to reunite him with his family

== Cast ==
- Nana Patekar as Deepak Tyagi "Babuji", Veeru's uncle
- Utkarsh Sharma as Veerendra alias Veeru Bhaiya, an cunning thief from Varanasi
- Simrat Kaur as Meena, Veerendra’s love interest and a dancer
- Rajpal Yadav as Pappu, Veerendra’s brother
- Khushbu Sunder as Vimla Tyagi, Deepak’s late wife
- Manish Wadhwa as Madhav
- Rajesh Sharma as Gautam Gupta
- Veerendra Saxena
- Ashwini Kalsekar as Rampatiya Mausi, Meena's aunt
- Mushtaq Khan as Inspector Lal Singh
- Hemant Kher as Somu Tyagi
- Bhakti Rathod as Manjari Tyagi, Somu's wife
- Kettan Singh as Bablu Tyagi
- Snehiil Dixit Mehraa as Anchal Tyagi, Bablu's wife
- Paritosh Tripathi as Chutka Tyagi
- Shruti Marathe as Pooja Tyagi, Chutka's wife
- Rajiv Gupta as Param Negi
- Prashant Bajaj as Pushkar Kapoor

== Production ==
The film was announced on 12 October 2024 coinciding with Dussehra. It is produced by Zee Studios, Anil Sharma, and Suman Sharma, marking another collaboration between Anil Sharma and Zee Studios.

== Soundtrack ==
Vanvaas

Soundtrack album by Mithoon and Monty Sharma
- Released: 17 December 2024
- Recorded: 2023–24
- Genre: Feature film soundtrack
- Length: 35:38
- Language: Hindi
- Label: Zee Music Company

Official audio
- Vanvaas – Full Album on YouTube

The music of the film is composed by Mithoon and Monty Sharma. The first single titled "Yaadon Ke Jharokhon Se", featuring the voices of Sonu Nigam and Shreya Ghoshal was released on 11 November 2024. The second single titled "Bandhan" was released on 28 November 2024. The third single titled "Geeli Maachis" was released on 9 December 2024.

No.	Title	Lyrics	Music	Singer(S)	Length
1.	"Yaadon Ke Jharokhon Se"	Sayeed Quadri	Mithoon	Sonu Nigam, Shreya Ghoshal, Mithoon	6:50
2.	"Bandhan"	Sayeed Quadri	Mithoon	Vishal Mishra, Palak Muchhal, Mithoon	5:58
3.	"Geeli Maachis"	Sayeed Quadri	Mithoon	Madhubanti Bagchi, Shadab Faridi, Mithoon	5:37
4.	"Chabilli Ke Naina"	Sunil Sirvaiya	Monty Sharma	Nana Patekar, Shaan, Monty Sharma, Gaurav Chati, Sanchari Sengupta	4:35
5.	"Ram Dhun"	Sayeed Quadri	Mithoon	Sonu Nigam, Sukhwinder Singh, Vijay Prakash, Mahalakshmi Iyer, Mohd. Danish, Mithoon	12:48
Total length:					35:38

== Marketing ==
Shubham Singh, visited KIIT to promote the film. At the press conference, which followed a visit to Lord Jagannath's temple in Puri.

The official teaser of the film was released on 29 October 2024. While its trailer was released on 2 December 2024.

To promote the film, Nana Patekar, Shubham Singh and Simrat Kaur performed Ganga Aarti in Varanasi.

== Release ==
=== Theatrical ===
Vanvaas was theatrically released on 20 December 2024.

=== Home media ===
The digital streaming rights for the film were acquired by ZEE5. The film began streaming on the platform on 14 March 2025, coinciding with the Holi festival.

== Reception ==
The performances of the cast (especially Patekar's) were praised by critics.

Anuj Kumar of The Hindu stated, "The seasoned performer embraces the quirks and quivers of Deepak Tyagi to generate an emotional bond with the audience." Abhishek Srivastava of The Times of India rated 2.5 out of 5 stars and wrote, "Sharma revisits familiar territory with ‘Vanvaas,’ a film with a socially relevant theme and genuine intent." and also said, "Patekar delivers a deeply impactful act, bringing authenticity and emotional depth to the trauma of being abandoned by his own sons."

Tanya Garg of English Jagran mentioned, "Nana Patekar's heartfelt drama is a must watch with family" and also added, "The movie skillfully combines drama and emotion to tell a compelling story that appeals to audiences of all ages." IndiaTV called Vanvaas, "Kalyug's Ramayana, you won't be able to stop crying after watching it."

Punjab Kesari wrote, "Vanvaas is a complete family entertainer with a very serious subject but also sprinkled with romance and humor." Navoday Times stated, "Nana Patekar has given a wonderful performance in the film and his dialogue delivery is also amazing."

Amit Bhatia of ABPLive mentioned, "You can watch this movie for your family, it will bring you closer to your family." Pratik Shekhar of News18 rated the film 3.5 out of 5 stars and wrote, "Nana Patekar's 'Vanvaas' is full of emotions." Shalini Langer of The Indian Express gave 1.5 stars out of 5 and said, "The Nana Patekar-starrer is a plodding affair."

Bollywood Hungama News Network gave 3 stars out of 5 and said, "VANVAAS delivers a heartfelt and sincere narrative that resonates deeply. With its poignant subject matter and an emotionally charged climax, it holds the promise of becoming the BAGHBAN for this generation. At the box office, its potential may be hindered by limited pre-release buzz, lack of widespread awareness, and stiff competition from PUSHPA 2 and other new releases.."

=== Box office ===
Within the first 14 days of its release, Bollywood Hungama reported that Vanvaas earned worldwide gross collection of ₹6.37 crore.
