= Ishita Chauhan =

Indian film actress and model

- Born: Ishita Chauhan; 14 September 1999 (age 27); Pune, India
- Occupations: Actress; model
- Years active: 2007–present
- Works: Aap Kaa Surroor, Hijack, Genius

Ishita Chauhan is an Indian actress and model. She debuted as a child in the Hindi film Aap Kaa Surroor in 2007. She also acted in Hijack (2008). She made her Bollywood debut in Anil Sharma's Genius as Nandini Chauhan opposite to Utkarsh Sharma which released on 24 August 2018.

== Career ==
Ishita started her career in Aap Kaa Surroor and Hijack. As a child artist, she also acted in many TV commercials - Fortune Cooking Oil, Vaseline, Chandrika Soap, Dettol Liquid Handwash, Aacron Colours, Kinetic Nova, Colgate, Medimix Soap, Medicare Shampoo, Rejoice Shampoo, Nestle are a few advertisements to name. She was a brand ambassador for girl's clothing brand named Peppermint. After her studies she returned to acting in the hit Asha Black. Ishita made her Bollywood Debut in Anil Sharma's Genius, opposite Utkarsh Sharma, released on 24 August 2018. Her performance was applauded, but the film received generally poor reviews due to the confusing narrative. However, the movie did wonders on ZEE5. The “Brain Olympics” scene from the movie often goes viral on Social Media. She will be next seen in Hero Heeroine alongside a big star cast including Divya Khosla, Paresh Rawal, Soni Razdan.

Television commercials and advertisements

In addition to her work in films and music videos, Ishita has appeared in advertising campaigns and television commercials for brands including PNG, Flipkart, Campus Shoes featuring actor Vicky Kaushal, Ahaglow, Nestasia, etc. She has also appeared in advertisements for several other brands.

Entrepreneurship

In October 2026, Ishita founder and launched Ishtaraa Jewels, a jewellery brand on the occasion of Dussehra. The brand focusses on fashion jewellery, including pieces intended for wedding celebrations and other special occasion, the venture marked her entry into entrepreneurship alongside her work in the entertainment industry.

== Filmography ==
Year	Film	Role	Language	Notes
2007	Aap Kaa Surroor	Thrishnu	Hindi	Debut film
2008	Hijack	Priya Madaan	Hindi	
2014	Asha Black	Asha Srinivas	Malayalam; Tamil	
2018	Genius	Nandini Chauhan	Hindi	

=== Music videos ===
Year	Song	Album	Singer(s)	Notes
2021	Tere Bagairr	Moods with Melodies	Pawandeep Rajan & Arunita Kanjilal	Songs composed by Himesh Reshammiya
2021	Pyarr Tumse	Moods with Melodies	Salman Ali	Songs composed by Himesh Reshammiya
