= Shravan Chhabria =

Indian Bollywood television actor

- Born: Mumbai, Maharashtra, India
- Occupation: Actor
- Years active: 2006–present

Shravan Chhabria (Hindi: श्रवण) is an Indian Bollywood television actor.

== Career ==
Shravan Chhabria started a career in modeling with Elite Agency in Mumbai at the age of 19. He then played a role in Prashant Chhadha's film Kuch Meetha Ho Jaaye opposite newcomer Mahima Chaudhry. After two years, he was given another break by Chhadha in Aap Kaa Surroor as the sidekick of Himesh Reshammiya. Shravan has since starred in a few TV serials and become a poker player.

== Filmography ==
Year	Film	Role	Other notes
2001	Kuch Khatti Kuch Meethi		
2005	Kuchh Meetha Ho Jaye	Rahul	Nominated, Filmfare Award for Best Male Debut
2007	Aap Kaa Surroor	Shravan Kumar	
2008	Mr. Black Mr. White		
