= Utkarsh Sharma =

Indian actor (born 1994)

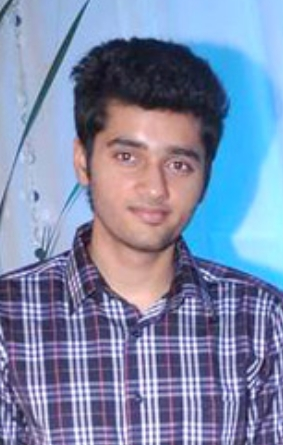
- Sharma in July 2012
- Born: 22 May 1994 (age 32); Mumbai, Maharashtra, India
- Occupation: Actor
- Years active: 2001–present
- Parents: Anil Sharma (father); Suman Sharma (mother)

Utkarsh Sharma is an Indian actor. The son of director Anil Sharma, he made his first screen appearance as a child in the 2001 film Gadar: Ek Prem Katha, which starred Sunny Deol and Ameesha Patel. As an adult, he made his debut with a leading role in the action thriller Genius (2018) and later worked in Gadar 2 (2023) and Vanvaas (2024).

== Life and career ==
Utkarsh Sharma is the son of Bollywood director Anil Sharma, who is well known for his movie Gadar: Ek Prem Katha. He earned a Bachelor's of Fine Arts in Production and Direction from Chapman University, and studied method acting from Lee Strasberg Theatre and Film Institute. After working as Charanjeet in Gadar: Ek Prem Katha, he played the lead role in Genius, an action thriller released 24 August 2018, directed by Anil Sharma, also starring Ishitha Chauhan, Nawazuddin Siddiqui, and Mithun Chakraborty. He also played the role of adult Jeetey in Gadar 2, released August 2023.

== Filmography ==
Year	Film	Role	Notes
2001	Gadar: Ek Prem Katha	Charan Jeet "Jeete" Singh	Child artist
2004	Ab Tumhare Hawale Watan Saathiyo	Kunal Jeet Singh	Child artist
2007	Apne	Angad Singh Choudhary	Child artist
2015	Purpose	—N/a	Director and Producer
2016	Still Life	—N/a	Writer
2018	Genius	Vashudev Shastri "Vasu"	
2023	Gadar 2	Charan Jeet "Jeete" Singh	
2024	Vanvaas	Veerendra "Veer" Singhania	
