= Veer (2010 film) =

2010 Indian film by Anil Sharma

- Theatrical release poster
- Directed by: Anil Sharma
- Screenplay by: Shailash Verma; Shaktimaan Talwar
- Story by: Salman Khan
- Based on: Taras Bulba by Nikolai Gogol
- Produced by: Vijay Galani
- Starring: Salman Khan; Mithun Chakraborty; Jackie Shroff; Zareen Khan; Sohail Khan
- Cinematography: Gopal Shah
- Edited by: Ashfaque Makrani
- Music by: Score: Monty Sharma; Songs: Sajid–Wajid
- Production company: Vijay Galani Movies
- Distributed by: Eros International
- Release date: January 22, 2010
- Running time: 164 minutes
- Country: India
- Language: Hindi

Veer (transl. Brave) is a 2010 Indian Hindi-language epic action film directed by Anil Sharma and produced by Vijay Gulan. It stars Salman Khan, Mithun Chakraborty, Jackie Shroff, Zareen Khan, and Sohail Khan.

Veer was released on 22 January 2010 and received mixed-to-negative reviews from critics.

== Plot ==
In 1875, Veer Pratap Singh (Salman Khan) is a Pindari warrior and the son of the great Pindari warrior Prithvi Singh (Mithun Chakraborty), who was known for his great battles for his people. The Pindaris have a longstanding feud with Gyanendra Singh (Jackie Shroff), the king of the Rajasthani Kingdom of Madhavgarh. The king had allied with the British and massacred several thousand Pindaris, leading to years of war and unrest. Along the way, Veer encounters Princess Yashodhara (Zareen Khan), the daughter of Gyanendra Singh, and is mesmerised by her beauty.

As the Pindaris are illiterate with little knowledge of the world outside their country, Veer and his younger brother, Punya Singh (Sohail Khan), are sent to complete their education at a college in London. Although the college has several classes and racial distinctions, Veer and his brother use their time to learn the ways of the British. He also manages to get close to Yashodhara, who is also a student at the college with her older brother, Crown Prince Gajendra (Puru Raaj Kumar). A few months before the completion of their education, Yashodhara's brother, who has been planning to quell the Pindari revolution, discovers Veer and Punya's true identity. As Veer runs in to save his brother enraged and kill Gajendra's men, Gajendra is killed by Veer. A heartbroken Yashodhara asks Veer never to see her again and not to set foot in Madhavgarh.

On their return to India, Yashodhara is crowned the Crown Princess of Madhavgarh, but is unable to forget Veer despite them being on opposing sides of the war. Gyanendra, who is still reeling from Gajendra's death, vows to avenge his son. Veer, on the other hand, receives his parents' permission to marry Yashodhara. However, he faces opposition from Gyanendra, who sees Veer as a threat to Madhavgarh and his rule and orders Veer to be killed. Veer and Punya, along with their supporters, devise a plan to infiltrate Madhavgarh, while Gyanendra allies with the British Governor of Rajasthan, James Fraser (Tim James Lawrence), saying that Madhavgarh will support the British in crushing the Pindari movement and eliminating Veer.

After Veer promises his father that he will destroy Gyanendra, he gatecrashes Yashodhara's Swayamvara. As he takes the princess away from the fort, Gyanendra sees a vast army of Pindaris surrounding his fort. He asks the British to help him, but they refuse and are trapped as well. They make the Pindaris their ally in a bid to escape from Madhavgarh. Before the British leave, a battle follows in which Fraser and Gyanendra are killed. Wounded from a gunshot, Veer dies in his father's arms. Years later, Veer's son "Veera" (Salman Khan) and Prithvi have a friendly brawl as credits roll.

== Cast ==
- Salman Khan as Veer Pratap Singh/Veera Pratap Singh (Dual role)
- Zareen Khan as Yuvrani Yashodhara Singh
- Mithun Chakraborty as Prithvi Singh, Veer's father
- Jackie Shroff as Raja Gyanendra Kumar Singh
- Sohail Khan as Punya Singh, Veer's brother
- Neena Gupta as Mangla Singh, Veer's mother
- Aryan Vaid as Sujan Singh
- Shahbaz Khan as Naunihaal
- Rajesh Vivek as Poojary
- Ashok Samarth as Magan
- Karmveer Choudhary as Mantri of Raja Gyanendra Singh
- Tim Lawrence as James Fraser, Governor General of Rajasthan
- Lisa Lazarus as Lady Angela Fraser, Governor James's wife
- Puru Raaj Kumar as Gajendra Singh
- Rishabh Jain as Dashrath, Veer's friend
- Yuri Suri as Haider Ali

== Production ==
Salman Khan conceived the film in 1990 while shooting for Baaghi, describing it as his dream project. Khan had initially planned to direct the film himself and had considered Sanjay Dutt for the lead role. Eventually, Anil Sharma agreed to direct the film. Veer is also partly based on the Russian novel Taras Bulba by Nikolai Gogol. To prepare for his role, Salman Khan went on a special diet and worked out with a personal trainer. For her role as a 19th-century princess, Zarine Khan gained eight kilograms.

Principal photography for Veer began on 1 December 2008. Portions of the film were originally scheduled to be shot at the College of Engineering and the Agricultural College in Pune, but due to the swine flu outbreak, the locations were shifted to Mumbai. Filming also took place in Jaipur and Bikaner. Location shooting at Amber Fort in Jaipur was also interrupted when several onlookers were injured and the Rajasthan High Court ordered a halt to filming. A case was filed against Anil Sharma accusing the film crew of damaging the fort, violating several conservation laws and causing the structure's 500-year-old roof to collapse. The crew finished their shoot after paying Rs. 2 million in damages.

Rochester Castle appears as a backdrop for a musical sequence named 'Everytime I look into your eyes I see my paradise' featuring a horse and carriage. The Chatham Dockyard provided the setting for many of the montage shots used in the UK dance sequences as well as the location where Veer first meets Yuvraji Yashodhara.

On 23 January 2010, author Pavan Chaudhary filed a Rs. 2 million suit against Khan, Anil Sharma and producer Vijay Galani, alleging that the film borrowed elements from his novel, Trilogy of Wisdom. The suit called for a halt of the film's screenings.

== Release ==
The trailer of Veer was released on 27 November 2009 at the screening of Priyadarshan's De Dana Dan.

ASTPL, an Indian software developer, also released a mobile video game based on the film.

== Reception ==
=== Critical reception ===
Veer received mixed-to-negative reviews from critics. On the review aggregator website Rotten Tomatoes, 40% of 5 critics' reviews are positive, with an average rating of 4/10.

Taran Adarsh criticized the writing and direction of the movie, describing it as a colossal disappointment. Rajeev Masand of CNN-IBN termed it as "an impossible film to appreciate", criticizing the performance of the support cast, while praising the performance of Salman Khan. Gaurav Malani praised the performance of Salman Khan, while terming the story as average. Noyon Jyoti Parasara of AOL.in also praised Salman Khan but added "Overall, 'Veer' has its pluses but it is sadly restricted to a very average film. It has nothing new and that only makes it seem slower."

Among U.S. critics, Frank Lovece of Film Journal International enjoyed it as "hokum of the highest order, punctuated with the most rousing musical sequences of the last several Indian imports," and after dissecting the film's numerous historical and chronological fallacies said, "Stateside Bollywood fans more accustomed to modern-day musical romances or stylish crime thrillers will be pleasantly surprised to find a period piece that's more Xena: Warrior Princess than A Passage to India.

=== Box office ===
According to Eros, Veer grossed Rs 410 million nett in its first week in India. Veer netted a lifetime of Rs 375.2 million (Rs 497.5 million gross) in India and was the 9th highest-grossing film domestically of 2010.

Veer has a worldwide lifetime gross of Rs 585.8 million ($12,600,000).

=== Criticism by Rajput community ===
The Rajput youth organisation Karni Sena was heavily critical of Veer, alleging that portions of the dialogue are "derogatory and demeaning for the Rajput community". Members of the group attacked several multiplexes in Jaipur, vandalising posters and smashing windows. Anil Sharma responded that it was a misunderstanding and no insult had been intended towards the Rajput community.

== Awards and nominations ==
2011 Zee Cine Awards

- Nominated – Best Female Debut – Zarine Khan

3rd Mirchi Music Awards

- Nominated – Lyricist of The Year – Gulzar for "Surili Akhiyon Wale"

== Soundtrack ==
Veer

Soundtrack album by Sajid–Wajid
- Released: 14 December 2009
- Genre: Feature film soundtrack
- Label: Eros Music

The film's music was released on 14 December 2009. The film's songs are composed by Sajid–Wajid, the film scores are composed by Monty Sharma and the lyrics are written by lyricist Gulzar.

Music critic Joginder Tuteja of Bollywood Hungama gave it an overall rating of 3.5 out of 5. The songs, Surili Akhiyon Wale, Salaam Aaya and Taali received special praise.

No.	Title	Artist(s)	Length
1.	"Meherbaniyan"	Sonu Nigam	4:29
2.	"Taali"	Sonu Nigam, Sukhwinder Singh, Wajid, Neuman Pinto	6:10
3.	"Surili Akhiyon Wale"	Rahat Fateh Ali Khan, Suzanne D'Mello	5:31
4.	"Kanha (Thumari)"	Rekha Bhardwaj, Sharib Sabri, Toshi Sabri, Shabab Sabri	4:36
5.	"Taali" (Version 2)	Sukhwinder Singh	6:01
6.	"Surili Akhiyon Wale" (Version 2)	Rahat Fateh Ali Khan, Sunidhi Chauhan, Suzanne D'Mello	5:23
7.	"Salaam Aaya"	Roop Kumar Rathod, Shreya Ghoshal, Suzanne D'Mello	4:45
8.	"Spirit of Veer" (Instrumental)		0:58

== See also ==
- List of historical drama films of Asia
