= Maharaja (1998 film) =

- DVD cover
- Directed by: Anil Sharma
- Written by: Shyam Goel
- Produced by: Naraindas Mukhija
- Starring: Govinda; Manisha Koirala; Raj Babbar; Shakti Kapoor
- Cinematography: Madhu Ambat
- Edited by: R. Rajendran
- Music by: Nadeem-Shravan
- Distributed by: Navchitra Productions
- Release date: 4 September 1998
- Country: India
- Language: Hindi
- Budget: ₹5.75 crore
- Box office: ₹11.22 crore

Maharaja is a 1998 Indian Hindi superhero film directed by Anil Sharma. It stars Govinda and Manisha Koirala in the title roles.

== Plot ==
Fearing his death, Ranbir Singh (Salim Ghouse) decides to kill Kohinoor when he is a child, though in vain. After 20 years, Kohinoor (Govinda) returns to claim his rightful place in the kingdom. He has developed advanced powers over matter and animals, which he uses to his advance to free his nanny, Ameenabi (Aruna Irani) who is being held by Ranbir and his associates. Kohinoor must pass numerous tests, including being exploited by a television reporter, Shaili Mathur (Manisha Koirala), who claims that she loves him; and fight hungry, blinded, man-eating lions.

== Cast ==
- Govinda as Prince Kohinoor Karan
- Manisha Koirala as Shaili Mathur
- Raj Babbar as Ali
- Salim Ghouse as Ranbir Singh
- Shakti Kapoor as Bhalu Prasad Bihari Orey
- Kulbhushan Kharbanda as Hanuman Baba
- Prem Chopra as Suryamani
- Monty Nath as Devkaran
- Aparajita Bhushan as Kohinoor's mom
- Kunickaa Sadanand as Mrs. Singh, Ranvir's wife
- Lambodar Nahak as Bride Broker
- Shashikala as Ranvir's mother
- Shanoor Mirza as Tutu, Shaili's younger brother
- Aruna Irani as Amina Bi
- Syed Badr-ul Hasan Khan Bahadur
- Sudhir as Hunter
- Neelam Mehra as Neelam
- Ishrat Ali as Munna,Suryamani's brother in law

== Soundtrack ==
Maharaja

Soundtrack album by Nadeem–Shravan
- Genre: Feature film soundtrack
- Label: Universal Music India

The music of Maharaja has been composed by Nadeem-Shravan with lyrics by Sameer. Tracks like 'Jab Tum Aajaate Ho Saamne'and 'Maharaja ki kahani' became famous during the release.

| # | Title | Singer(s) | |
|---|---|---|---|
| 1 | "Maharaja Maharaja" | Udit Narayan, Kavita Krishnamurthy | |
| 2 | "Jab Tum Aa Jaate Ho" | Sonu Nigam, Kavita Krishnamurthy | [Jab Tum Aa Jaate Ho Saamne - Dailymotion] |
| 3 | "Thero To Sahi Socho To" | Sonu Nigam | |
| 4 | "Hai Ajnabi" | Sonu Nigam | |
| 5 | "Maharaja Ki Kahani" | Udit Narayan, Kavita Krishnamurthy | |
| 6 | "Ishq Mohabbat" | Kavita Krishnamurthy | |
| 7 | "Mera Pyara Mukhda" | Kavita Krishnamurthy, Shankar Mahadevan | |

== Reception ==
Syed Firdaus Ashra of Rediff.com wrote, "The film is badly edited, sequences of scenes often being pretty disjointed. But the cinematography by Madhu Ambat is excellent. Particularly impressive was a chase on horseback, and some grand vistas of jungle and river. But the animation involving the animals was visibly fake and terrible to watch.
