= Genius (2018 Hindi film) =

2018 Indian film by Anil Sharma

- Theatrical release poster
- Directed by: Anil Sharma
- Written by: Anil Sharma
- Screenplay by: Sunil Sirvaiya; Amjad Ali
- Story by: Anil Sharma
- Produced by: Deepak Mukut; Anil Sharma; K. C. Sharma; Kamal Mukut
- Starring: Utkarsh Sharma; Ishita Chauhan
- Cinematography: Najeeb Khan
- Edited by: Ashfaque Makrani
- Music by: Songs: Himesh Reshammiya; Score: Monty Sharma
- Production companies: Anil Sharma Productions; Soham RockStar Entertainment
- Distributed by: Soham Rockstar Entertainment
- Release date: 24 August 2018
- Running time: 165 minutes
- Country: India
- Language: Hindi
- Budget: ₹15 crore
- Box office: est. ₹7.50 crore

Genius is a 2018 Indian Hindi-language romantic psychological action thriller film directed by Anil Sharma. It marks the debut of his son Utkarsh Sharma as a male lead, who also featured as a child actor in Sharma's 2001 film Gadar: Ek Prem Katha. Ishita Chauhan, Nawazuddin Siddiqui, and Mithun Chakraborty, with Ayesha Jhulka, and Malti Chahar play supporting roles in the film.

== Plot ==
The film starts with Vasudev Shastri, a genius Research and Analysis Wing agent, being labelled as incompetent because he had failed in an important mission and got himself too injured to work again. Later, when he sits by a park depressed, Nandini, the love of his life, consoles him. The film then goes into a flashback where Vasudev Shastri who is a topper yet charming man who comes to IIT Roorkee where the second ranker, Nandini Chauhan, out of jealousy, decides to make his life hell. She constantly detests him, but Vasu outsmarts her every time. Besides being the friendly "genius" around campus, he secretly uses his hacking talent working part time for RAW.

The day before the final exam in IIT, Nandini reluctantly visits Vasudev to get help regarding a theorem. There, Vasudev admits to Nandini that he had been long in love with her. Hearing this, Nandini immediately hatches a cunning plan and gives Vasudev sleeping pills so that he is unable to attend the exam the next day. However, Vasudev outsmarts her this time as well and reaches the exam hall before her. Vasu doesn't at all seem angry with her and instead helps her with an unexpected glitch and walks away smiling after completing his paper. On the day of the results, Nandini learns that Vasudev had intentionally submitted a blank paper just to let her top. Seeing his dedication towards love, Nandini madly falls in love with him but doesn't reveal it and flies off to the US for her dream job.

On the other hand, senior members of RAW, impressed by Vasudev's intelligence, try to convince him to join RAW. After learning that his parents were killed in communal riots planned by ISI of Pakistan, Vasu finally decides to join RAW to take revenge against ISI. The film returns to the present, where Vasudev, who is labelled incompetent by RAW, uses a walking stick and suffers from acute tinnitus and several injuries since his failed mission.

Nandini had taken a break from her job to return to India and take care of Vasu. She takes Vasudev to her house in Puducherry, where her mother is pleasantly surprised to see Nandini (who had never valued personal relationships before her career) make huge sacrifices for Vasudev's welfare. Vasudev and Nandini spend some romantic moments, but their happiness is short lived as Vasudev starts having hallucinations about his failed mission.

A confused Nandini tries to take Vasudev to the US for treatment. Vasudev refuses and narrates the tragic story of his failed mission to Nandini, after which he leaves to track MRS, the mastermind of ISI in India and the prime target of his failed mission. Soon after, it is shown that all the hallucinations were just a drama set up by Vasudev to track his enemies. He, one by one, kills everyone who had helped MRS. On the other hand, MRS senses Vasudev's return and plans to kill him in a masquerade party. In the masquerade party, Vasudev saves himself but gets injured once again. Seeing Vasudev's miserable condition, Nandini breaks down. MRS, who was secretly observing them, takes advantage of this and kidnaps Nandini. Soon after, the senior members of RAW acknowledge his competence. With the help of RAW, Vasudev finds Nandini, saves Mathura from a huge blast and finally kills MRS by drowning him in the river. All members of RAW praise him. The film ends with him sharing a big hug with Nandini.

== Cast ==
- Utkarsh Sharma as Vasudev Shastri, RAW's special Agent and Nandini's love interest
- Ishitha Chauhan as Nandini Chauhan, Vasudev's love interest
- Nawazuddin Siddiqui as Mr Samar Khan / MRS, an ISI agent and mastermind of ISI in India
- Mithun Chakraborthy as NSA Chief Jaishankar Prasad
- Anirban Mitra as NSA Officer Bablu
- Malti Chahar as Rubina, RAW Agent.
- Ayesha Jhulka as Nandini's mother
- KK Raina as Mr Das
- Zakir Hussain as Minister
- Abhimanyu Singh as Mr. Praveen Joshi, an IB officer
- Arjun Dwivedi as Saleem
- Dev Gill as Mr. Rajiv Ranjan, MRS mole in RAW
- Ashok Samarth as Commander Arjun Singh Rathore
- Rajesh Bhati as Samar Khan right hand

== Reception ==
The film received generally poor reviews. Reviews were particularly critical of the confusing narrative and the standard of acting. Bollywood Hungama gave it 1/5 stars saying, "On the whole, GENIUS is an extremely poor and senseless fare." Ronak Kotecha of The Times of India was equally critical of the film giving it 2/5 stars. The Indian Express gave it a "nil" rating describing it as feeling redundant.

== Soundtrack ==
Genius

Soundtrack album by Himesh Reshammiya
- Released: 9 August 2018
- Recorded: 2018
- Venue: Mumbai
- Studio: HR Musik Limited
- Genre: Feature film soundtrack
- Length: 26:28
- Language: Hindi
- Label: Tips Music
- Producer: Himesh Reshammiya

Himesh Reshammiya chronology
Teraa Surroor (2016)	Genius (2018)	Happy Hardy and Heer (2020)

Official audio
- Tera Fitoor Song Video - Genius on YouTube

Singles from Genius
- 1. "Tera Fitoor" Released: 12 July 2018; 2. "Dil Meri Na Sune" Released: 28 July 2018; 3. "Holi Biraj Ma" Released: 5 August 2018; 4. "Pyar Le Pyar De" Released: 21 August 2018; 5. "Tujhse Kahan Juda Hoon Main" Released: 27 August 2018

The music of the film is composed by Himesh Reshammiya, and Monty Sharma composed the background score, while lyrics are penned by Manoj Muntashir, Kumaar, and Shabbir Ahmed. The first song of the film "Tera Fitoor", which is sung by Arijit Singh was released on 12 July 2018 . The album was released on 9 August 2018 by Tips Music.

Track listing
No.	Title	Lyrics	Singer(s)	Length
1.	"Tera Fitoor"	Kumaar	Arijit Singh	5:10
2.	"Dil Meri Na Sune"	Manoj Muntashir	Atif Aslam	3:56
3.	"Tujhse Kahan Juda Hoon Main"	Shabbir Ahmed	Himesh Reshammiya, Neeti Mohan, Vineet Singh	4:42
4.	"Holi Biraj Ma"	Manoj Muntashir	Jubin Nautiyal	3:35
5.	"Pyar Le Pyar De"	Shabbir Ahmed	Dev Negi, Ikka, Iulia Vantur	5:10
6.	"Dil Meri Na Sune" (Reprise)	Manoj Muntashir	Atif Aslam, Payal Dev	3:55
Total length:				26:28
