= Apne =

2007 Indian film by Anil Sharma

- Theatrical release poster
- Directed by: Anil Sharma
- Written by: Neerraj Pathak
- Produced by: Rahul Sughand; Sangeeta Ahir
- Starring: Dharmendra; Sunny Deol; Bobby Deol; Shilpa Shetty; Katrina Kaif; Kirron Kher; Javed Sheikh; Victor Banerjee; Jonnie Brown
- Cinematography: Kabir Lal
- Edited by: Ashfaque Makrani
- Music by: Score: Monty Sharma; Songs: Himesh Reshammiya
- Production companies: Prime Focus; Glamour Entertainment
- Distributed by: Vijayta Films
- Release date: 29 June 2007
- Running time: 174 minutes
- Country: India
- Language: Hindi
- Budget: ₹20 crore
- Box office: ₹39.28 crore

Apne (transl. Ours) is a 2007 Indian Hindi-language sports drama film directed by Anil Sharma. It stars Dharmendra, Sunny Deol, Bobby Deol, Katrina Kaif and Shilpa Shetty. It is the first film to feature Dharmendra, and his real-life sons Sunny Deol and Bobby Deol together. Previously, Sunny and Bobby had worked together in Dillagi (1999), and Dharmendra and Sunny had also appeared together in Sultanat (1986) and Kshatriya (1993). The story revolves around Baldev Chaudhary (Dharmandra), a disgraced former heavyweight boxer, who tries to wash a stain in his boxing career through his sons Angad and Karan (Sunny and Bobby Deol). The theme of a disgruntled retired boxer seeking personal redemption through a boxer son had been explored earlier in Hindi cinema, in Boxer (1984). Dharmendra had earlier played the role of a boxer in the film Main Intequam Loonga (1982). Footage from that film is used as flashback scenes in this film to show Baldev's career as a boxer.

The film was released on 29 June 2007, and received positive reviews from critics and emerged as a commercial success at the box office.

== Plot ==
Olympic medallist, professional heavyweight boxer, Baldev Singh Choudhary is disgraced while competing for the World Heavyweight Boxing Championship when a betting syndicate falsely accuses him of drug doping. He tries to erase this stain upon his honour by training up his son, Angad, but financial difficulties keep them from achieving his dream, straining their relationship with each other. Baldev's younger son, Karan, an aspiring musician with a paralyzed arm, has just launched his first music album.

Baldev trains a local boy, Gaurav, to participate in a media-hyped TV boxing show, but he is dropped for another coach at the last minute. Baldev, distraught at this, is consoled by Karan, who overcomes his paralysis in a moment of emotional intensity. Realising his father is depressed, Karan gives up his own dream of a musical career to become a boxer and please his father. Karan persists with training and wins a series of fights, thinking that victory will bring his family together. The final match is with Luca Gracia, the current world heavyweight champion; Karan is tricked, and he ends up hospitalized. Baldev, who wanted to wash a stigma, is now about to lose his son. When Karan reveals the world heavyweight champion cheated, Angad decides to return to boxing and win the title for his father.

Although Angad is also badly injured in a boxing match, he somehow survives and wins the match. Meanwhile, Karan suffers liver damage and requires a liver transplant to survive. A pang of guilt-stricken Baldev pleads with the doctors to use his liver, but the doctors reject the idea. In a stroke of luck, a liver is given to Karan through an unknown donor. In the end, Baldev, who was going to give up his life for Karan, is instead alive and happy with his family.

== Cast ==
- Dharmendra as Baldev Singh Chaudhary – Former professional heavyweight boxer
- Sunny Deol as Angad Singh Chaudhary – Baldev's elder son, Simran's husband
- Bobby Deol as Karan Singh Chaudhary – Baldev's younger son, Nandini's boyfriend and fiancé
- Shilpa Shetty as Simran Chaudhary – Angad’s wife
- Katrina Kaif as Dr. Nandini Sarabhai – Karan’s girlfriend and fiancée
- Kirron Kher as Ravi Chaudhary – Baldev’s wife, Angad and Karan’s mother
- Javed Sheikh as Roy – Media baron, Baldev's friend
- Victor Banerjee as Ehsaan Ali – Boxing coach, Baldev's friend
- Jonnie Brown as Luca Gracia – Professional heavyweight boxer
- Aryan Vaid as Gaurav Gera
- Divya Dutta as Pooja B. Singh Choudhary
- Kurush Deboo as Dr. Niranjan Sarabhai – Nandini's father
- Parvin Dabas as Saket
- Nishikant Dixit as Sukhi Lala
- Rajendra Gupta as Bhullar Saab
- Master Utkarsh Sharma as Child Angad Singh Chaudhary
- Raj Khatri as Boxing commentator
- Bhagwant Mann as himself
- Amar Singh as Himself

== Music ==
Apne

Soundtrack album by Himesh Reshammiya
- Released: 22 May 2007
- Genre: Film soundtrack
- Label: T-Series
- Producer: Himesh Reshammiya

Himesh Reshammiya chronology
Fool N Final (2007)	Apne (2007)	Aap Kaa Surroor (2007)

The music for the film’s songs was composed by Himesh Reshammiya, with lyrics penned by Sameer. The background score of the movie was done by Monty Sharma.

No.	Title	Singer(s)	Length
1.	"Mehfuz Rakhta"	Himesh Reshammiya	4:08
2.	"Dekhoon Tujhe To Pyaar Aaye"	Himesh Reshammiya, Akriti Kakkar	5:06
3.	"Apne To Apne Hote Hain"	Jaspinder Narula, Sonu Nigam, Jayesh Gandhi	5:12
4.	"Anch Vich Chehra Pyaar Da"	Shaan, Kunal Ganjawala, Amrita Kak, Himesh Reshammiya	4:50
5.	"Bulls Eye"	Shaan, Earl D'Souza	3:45
6.	"Tere Sang Ek Simple Si Coffee"	Jaspinder Narula, Sonu Nigam	4:40
7.	"Mehfooz" (Remix)	Himesh Reshammiya	4:16
8.	"Ankh Vich Chehra Pyaar Da" (Remix)	Shaan, Amrita Kak, Himesh Reshammiya, Kunal Gunjanwala	5:34
9.	"Dekhoon Tujhe To Pyaar Aaye" (Remix)	Himesh Reshammiya, Akriti Kakkar	5:58

== Reception ==
=== Box office ===
Apne opened to a good response throughout the country especially in the North India where it had a mammoth opening becoming a super-hit in the long run. The rest of the country saw a good opening for the film.

The film was declared a "hit" in India and overseas.

=== Critical response ===
Taran Adarsh wrote "Apne is rich in emotions and has the potential to strike a chord with families. Those who love emotional fares are bound to take a liking for its theme". Sukanya Verma of Rediff.com gave 3/5 stars and wrote "Ultimately, it is an Anil Sharma film. Going by his past record (Tehelka, Hukumat, Gadar: Ek Prem Katha, The Hero: Love Story of a Spy), the man has an amazing appetite for kitsch and absurdities. The movie bears his stamp alright".

== Cancelled Sequel ==
A sequel titled Apne 2 was officially announced on 30 November 2020, at first, it was postponed due to the COVID-19 pandemic and Music Director Himesh Reshammiya was already working on the music and the film would have starred Dharmendra, Sunny Deol, Bobby Deol and Karan Deol. It was cancelled in November 2025 following the death of Dharmendra.

== See also ==
- List of boxing films
