= Hukumat =

- Promotional poster
- Directed by: Anil Sharma
- Written by: Anil Sharma
- Produced by: K.C Sharma
- Starring: Dharmendra; Rati Agnihotri
- Cinematography: Anil Dhanda
- Music by: Laxmikant–Pyarelal
- Production company: Shantketan Films
- Release date: 27 March 1987
- Running time: 150 minutes
- Country: India
- Language: Hindi

Hukumat (transl. Rule) is a 1987 Indian Hindi-language action film directed by Anil Sharma, starring Dharmendra and Rati Agnihotri, while Swapna and Sadashiv Amrapurkar play supporting roles. The film became the highest-grossing Bollywood film of 1987. It also received highly positive response from critics. It was remade in Tamil as Puthiya Vaanam.

== Plot ==
Arjun Singh is a dare-devil upright cop who believes in dealing strongly with criminals. D.I.G. Khan does not agree with his ways and there is always a disagreement between the two. Arjun is sent on a special mission to Shanti Nagar, which in under the police scanner due to some shady activities going on there. On reaching Shanti Nagar, Arjun sees that it is ruled by a wealthy businessman, Deen Bandhu Deena Nath aka D.B.D.N., who has very high contacts. He has terrorised the town with the help of his convoy of uniformed men who kill the citizens at will. Arjun realises that D.B.D.N is none other than Mangal Singh, the corrupt police officer who had killed Shankardayal Singh, Arjun's father when Arjun was a child. Arjun gets thirsty for D.B.D.N's blood, but is stopped by D.I.G Khan. But when D.B.D.N kills Arjun's young son, Arjun, with the help of D.I.G Khan sets out to overturn the evil rule (Hukumat) of D.B.D.N

== Cast ==
Actor	Character
Dharmendra	S.P. Arjun Singh
Shammi Kapoor	D.I.G. Khan
Rati Agnihotri	Kusum Singh
Swapna	Sonia
Goga Kapoor	Jamaal Sen
Sadashiv Amrapurkar	Mangal Singh /Deenbandhu Dinanath (DBDN)
Prem Chopra	Nanumal Thekedar
Deepak Qazir	DBDN Secretary
Joginder	Dharam Singh
Praveen Kumar Sobti	Rakhshash
Deep Dhillon	DBDN Henchman
Lilliput	Bhimsen
Padma Khanna	Ramkatori
Sudhir	Javed
Jankidas	Railway Ticket Collector of Shantinagar
Pinchoo Kapoor	Keshav Lal
Rajendra Nath	Charlie
Raj Kishore	Chalta Firta Market
Beena Banerjee	Village Woman
Parikshit Sahni	Shankardayal Singh
Jugal Hansraj	Chintu
Sudhir Dalvi	Sonia's Dad
Chandrashekhar Vaidya	Minister
Guddi Maruti	Prostitutes in Red Light Area Dancer in "Ram Ram Bol" song
Huma Khan	Prostitutes in Red Light Area Dancer in "Ram Ram Bol" song
K.N. Singh	DBDN Friend's (Cameo}
Bob Christo	Bob (Cameo)
Manorama	Chinese Lady (Cameo)
Rajan Haksar	Pakistani Man (Cameo)

== Soundtrack ==
Music for the film was scored by the duo of Laxmikant–Pyarelal. All lyrics are by Verma Malik.

#	Title	Singer(s)
1	"Na Zulm Na Zalim Ka"	Alka Yagnik, Kavita Krishnamurthy, Mohammed Aziz
2	"Es Afsar Ka Baja"	Shabbir Kumar, Kavita Krishnamurthy
3	"Ram Ram Bol"	Shabbir Kumar, Alka Yagnik, Kavita Krishnamurthy
4	"Zulm Karne Se Bura Hai"	Alka Yagnik, Kavita Krishnamurthy, Mohammed Aziz
