= Bandhan Kuchchey Dhaagon Ka =

- Theatrical poster
- Directed by: Anil Sharma
- Written by: Anil Sharma
- Produced by: K. C. Sharma
- Starring: Shashi Kapoor; Raakhee; Zeenat Aman
- Cinematography: Anil Dhanda
- Edited by: Tulsi Ghimire
- Music by: Hemant Bhonsle
- Distributed by: Shantketan Films
- Release date: 1983
- Running time: 116 minutes
- Country: India
- Language: Hindi

Bandhan Kuchchey Dhaagon Ka (lit. 'Slender Threads') is a 1983 Indian Bollywood film directed by Anil Sharma. It stars Shashi Kapoor, Zeenat Aman and Raakhee in pivotal roles.

== Plot ==
Prem Kapoor is a businessman who lives in a small town with his wife, Bhavna, who is a Judge, and two children, Sunil and Babli. One Sunday, he gets a visitor by the name of Prakash Dutt, who has brought a letter from a woman named Sneh who lives in Bombay, has known Prem for the last seven years, and wants to urgently meet with him. Prem departs for Bombay, meets with Sneh and finds out that he is the father of a seven-year-old boy, Bittu, who is Sneh's son, as a result of intimacy shared between them over seven years ago. Sneh has been diagnosed with cancer and is not expected to live long, she wants Bittu to be taken care of, and Prem agrees to do so. He takes Bittu home with him, while Sneh goes to America for treatment. It is here that Prem will be confronted by Bhavna on one hand, his children on the other, and a blackmailer who wants a huge sum of money to keep the truth about Sneh and Prem's affair from Bhavna and the children.

== Cast ==
- Shashi Kapoor as Prem Kapoor
- Zeenat Aman as Sneh
- Raakhee as Bhavna
- Deven Verma as Ratanpal Singh
- Bindu as Dr. Shobha
- Prem Chopra as Prakash Dutt
- Master Ravi as Sunil P. Kapoor
- Shubha Khote as Mrs Sheela Malkan
- Raza Murad as Advocate Vikram Kapoor
- Rajendra Nath as Wedding Guest Hanuman Prasad
- Rehana Sultan as Advocate Thakur
- Yunus Parvez as Saxena, Mrs. Malkan's lawyer
- Sonia Sahni as Sneh's Nurse
- Jankidas as Sneh's servant
- Master Bittoo as Bittu P. Kapoor

== Soundtrack ==
Bandhan Kuchchey Dhaagon Ka

Soundtrack album by Hemant Bhonsle Anjaan (lyrics)
- Released: 31 December 1983
- Genre: Feature film soundtrack
- Label: Saregama
- Producer: K. C. Sharma

1. Yeh Bandhan Kachche Dhago Ka (Male) - Kishore Kumar
2. Yeh Bandhan Kachche Dhago Ka (Duet) - Lata Mangeshkar, Kishore Kumar
3. Yeh Bandhan Kachche Dhagon Ka (sad) - Kishore Kumar
4. Yeh Bandhan Kachche Dhagon ka (Sad) version II - Lata Mangeshkar
5. Hands Up Jaani Hands Up- Usha Uthup, Suresh Wadkar, Asha Bhosle
6. Piya Tohe Laaj Nahi Aave - Kishore Kumar, Asha Bhosle
