= Kuchh Meetha Ho Jaye =

- Movie poster
- Directed by: Samar Khan
- Written by: Samar Khan; Rohit Malhotra
- Produced by: Ketan Maroo
- Starring: Arshad Warsi; Mahima Chaudhry; Parvin Dabbas
- Cinematography: Sameer Arya
- Edited by: Umesh Gupta
- Music by: Himesh Reshammiya
- Production company: Shemaroo Entertainment
- Distributed by: Eros Entertainment; Shemaroo Entertainment
- Release date: 15 April 2005
- Running time: 162 minutes
- Country: India
- Language: Hindi

Kuchh Meetha Ho Jaye (transl. Let's Have Something Sweet) is a 2005 Indian Hindi-language romantic comedy film directed by Samar Khan. The film stars Arshad Warsi, Mahima Chaudhry, and Parvin Dabas, while Shah Rukh Khan made a cameo appearance as himself. The title of the film was taken from the Cadbury Dairy Milk tagline of the same name.

== Plot ==
A planeload of passengers are stranded in distant Ganganagar in rural India as their plane cannot take off due to technical problems. The Airport Manager is S.R. Khan, intoxicated and belligerent at most times, gets to meet his former sweetheart, Gulab Khan, in the company of her husband, his wise-cracking Sikh Assistant, Ram Saran Dubey, whose mother is a Sardarni, while his dad is from Bihar. An estranged father, Sunil Wadhwa, and his wife try to pacify their daughter into accepting their imminent separation, while Italian Siddharth has only a few hours to make up his mind who he wants to marry, Anita Ahuja or Manju Narang, who both happen to be cousins and both aggressively want to be his wife. The Pilot Captain Vikram Sinha is shattered when he gets the news that his affair with air-hostess Rachna has resulted in a much avoidable pregnancy. Internet lovers Farha and Rahul finally meet - only to come to face with reality as Farha's father disapproves of her affair with Rahul and does not want her to come home. Farha also goes missing, then. All this happens amid a mysterious male asleep on a bench in the airport lounge, and he is not to be disturbed under any circumstances. The mysterious male is Farha's idol Shah Rukh Khan, who persuades her to return home with Rahul and ensures their parents approve it.

== Cast ==
- Arshad Warsi as Manager S.R Khan
- Mahima Chaudhry as Ghulab Khan
- Aditya Lakhia as Tanny
- Parvin Dabas as Siddharth
- Sandhya Mridul as Rachna Singh
- Deepti Naval
- Rohit Roy as Pilot Vikram Gill
- Shravan as Rahul
- Sachin Khedekar as Suniel Wadhwa
- Iravati Harshe as Vibha Wadhwa
- Kanwaljit Singh as Col. Shamsher Bubbles Kapoor
- Jaspal Bhatti as Ram Saran Dubey
- Mrinal Kulkarni as Chanchal Chugh
- Ashwin Mushran as Ben Sidebottom
- Nassar Abdullah as Gul Khan
- Shah Rukh Khan as himself (cameo appearance)

== Soundtrack ==
Kuchh Meetha Ho Jaye

Soundtrack album by Himesh Reshammiya
- Released: 15 April 2005
- Venue: Mumbai
- Genre: Feature film soundtrack
- Length: 35:00
- Language: Hindi
- Label: Shemaroo
- Producer: Himesh Reshammiya

Himesh Reshammiya chronology
Blackmail (2005)	Kuchh Meetha Ho Jaye (2005)	Main Aisa Hi Hoon (2005)

The soundtrack of Kuchh Meetha Ho Jaye consists of seven songs composed by Himesh Reshammiya, with the lyrics written by Sameer.

#	Title	Singer(s)
1	"Kuchh Meetha Ho Jaye" (duet)	Sonu Nigam, Jayesh Gandhi, Shreya Ghoshal
2	"Kuchh Meetha Ho Jaye" (female)	Arpita Mukherjee
3	"Bhool Jayege Hum"	Udit Narayan, Shreya Ghoshal
4	"Aane Do" (thumri)	Dr. Shoma Ghosh
5	"Bhool Jayenge Hum I"	Udit Narayan, Shreya Ghoshal
6	"Lagne Lage Ho"	Sonu Nigam, Alka Yagnik
7	"Jaana Tenu Rab Da"	Kunal Ganjawala, Sunidhi Chauhan
8	"Aane Do"	Shoma Ghosh
