= Aap Kaa Surroor =

2007 Indian film by Prashant Chadha

- Theatrical release poster
- Directed by: Prashant Chadha
- Story by: Vibha Singh
- Produced by: Vijay Taneja
- Starring: Himesh Reshammiya; Hansika Motwani; Mallika Sherawat
- Cinematography: Manoj Soni
- Edited by: Sudhir Mehan
- Music by: Himesh Reshammiya
- Production company: Mehboob Studio
- Release date: 29 June 2007
- Running time: 127 minutes
- Country: India
- Language: Hindi
- Budget: ₹9 crore
- Box office: ₹19.5 crore

Aap Kaa Surroor (transl. Your Joy) is a 2007 Indian Hindi-language musical romantic thriller film directed by Prashant Chadha and starring singer Himesh Reshammiya in his debut as an actor, alongside Hansika Motwani and Malika Sherawat. Reshammiya has claimed the story is based on his own life and was named after his music album Aap Kaa Surroor. It was shot mostly in Germany and was released on 29 June 2007. Despite being negatively received by critics, it turned out to be a commercial success. This was Hansika's first Hindi film as a leading actress, as she was previously seen in all her films as a child actor.

== Synopsis ==
A TV journalist, Nadia Merchant, is found dead in a remote part of Germany. Shortly afterward, Indian singer HR is arrested by the German police following a concert and charged with her murder. While in custody, events unfold in flashback.

During a performance tour in Germany, HR travels with his close friend Shravan and meets event organizer Khurana, his associate Ruby James, and event planner Riya Bakshi. HR and Riya develop a romantic relationship, and Riya’s father, Mr. Bakshi, eventually approves of their match.

Following HR’s arrest, he seeks legal assistance from Ruby, who agrees to help but is later revealed to be in love with him. HR, who remains committed to Riya, escapes from custody by taking Nadia’s father, former police officer Feroz Merchant, hostage. He is given one day to uncover the real killer before Riya’s impending marriage to someone else.

With assistance from Shravan and Bani, HR approaches Ruby—believing she is not involved in the crime—and begins investigating Khurana’s business records. They discover Khurana had financial motives to sabotage HR due to losses from a previous world tour agreement. Confronted by HR, Khurana confesses to the murder and to framing HR. His confession is recorded on camera, leading to his arrest. HR is exonerated, and he reunites with Riya.

== Cast ==
- Himesh Reshammiya as HR / Himself
- Hansika Motwani as Riya Bakshi
- Mallika Sherawat as Advocate Ruby James; Khurana's Business partner
- Darshan Jariwala as Khurana; Event organizer and Advocate Ruby James's Business partner
- Raj Babbar as Ex-cop Feroz Merchant; Nadia's father
- Shravan as Shravan Kumar
- Bani J as Bani, Riya's friend
- Sachin Khedekar as Mr. Bakshi, Riya's father
- Anant Mahadevan as TV News Reporter for Channel ITV
- Ishita Chauhan as Trishnu
- Lovepreet Aujla as Himesh's friend
- Marrissa Lawrence as Nadia F. Merchant
- Sanjay Sharma as Raju
- Pankaj Jha as Ghulam Sayyed auto rickshaw Driver
- Abhijeet Chavan as Chinman Rao auto rickshaw driver
- Lallan Dubey as Lallan Dubey auto rickshaw driver
- Souzan Alavi as Background Dancer
- Kathrin Susanne Rieger as Fan
- Esther Maria Pietsch as Flight Attendant
- Ryan Estrada as Himself (German police officer)
- Ron Matz as Sam (German police officer)
- Esther Maria Pietsch as stewardess (German police officer)
- Frank Brandstatter as man in the crowd; Indian journalist in the background who helps to translate Khurana's confession
- Vijay Taneja as Mr. Vijay Taneja / Himself (Special appearance)
- Johannes Bergner (German Police Officer)
- Frederic Schaefer (German Police Officer)

== Soundtrack ==
Aap Kaa Surroor

Soundtrack album by Himesh Reshammiya
- Released: 28 April 2007
- Recorded: 2007
- Venue: Mumbai
- Studio: Mehboob Studio
- Genre: Feature film soundtrack
- Length: 44:02
- Label: T-Series
- Producer: Himesh Reshammiya

Himesh Reshammiya chronology
Apne (2007)	Aap Kaa Surroor (2007)	Fear (2007)

The film's music was composed by Himesh Reshammiya, with lyrics by Sameer. According to the Indian trade portal Box Office India, the soundtrack sold approximately 1.3 million units, making it the seventh highest-selling album of the year. Tracks one through seven were remixed and mixed by DJ Akbar Sami.

No.	Title	Singer(s)	Length
1.	"Assalam Vaalekum"	Himesh Reshammiya	6:00
2.	"Tera Mera Milna"	Himesh Reshammiya, Shreya Ghoshal	5:50
3.	"Jhoot Nahin Bolna"	Himesh Reshammiya, Shreya Ghoshal	6:10
4.	"Tanhaiyaan"	Himesh Reshammiya, Sunidhi Chauhan	5:06
5.	"Ya Ali"	Himesh Reshammiya, Sunidhi Chauhan	4:32
6.	"Tere Bina"	Himesh Reshammiya, Devendra Singh	5:35
7.	"Kya Jeena"	Himesh Reshammiya	5:14
8.	"Mehbooba O Mehbooba (A Tribute to Panchamda) (Originally composed by R.D. Burman)"	Himesh Reshammiya, Asha Bhosle	4:54
9.	"Tanhaiyaan" (Unplugged)	Himesh Reshammiya, Sunidhi Chauhan	2:10
10.	"Tera Tera Tera Surroor"	Himesh Reshammiya	4:05
11.	"Naam Hai Tera Tera"	Himesh Reshammiya	4:53

== Reception ==
=== Box office ===
According to Box Office India, Aap Kaa Surroor earned approximately ₹240 million (US$2.8 million) at the domestic box office and was classified as "average."

=== Critical reception ===
Taran Adarsh of IndiaFM rated Aap Kaa Surroor 3.5 out of 5, stating, "Critics be damned, this one's for the masses!" Syed Firdaus Ashraf of Rediff.com awarded it 3 out of 5, noting that while the story was "very ordinary," the film was elevated by its music, with well-placed songs that sustained viewer engagement.

In contrast, Gautam Chintamani, also writing for Rediff.com, gave the film 2.5 out of 5. He found the narrative disjointed and commented that the film appeared to be "trying to cash in on the Himesh wave," with visually appealing songs interspersed with what he described as a weak script. Khalid Mohamed of Hindustan Times was more critical, citing issues with the storyline, direction, and Reshammiya’s performance. He described the film as an "amateur brain toaster."

== Awards ==
Award	Date of ceremony	Category	Nominee	Result	Ref.
Sabsey Favourite Kaun Awards	27 December 2007	Sabsey Tez Sitara (Most Favorite Rising Star)	Himesh Reshammiya	Won	
Stardust Awards	26 January 2008	Superstar of Tomorrow – Male	Himesh Reshammiya	Nominated	
Stardust Awards	26 January 2008	Superstar of Tomorrow – Female	Hansika Motwani	Nominated	
Filmfare Awards	16 February 2008	Best Female Debut	Hansika Motwani	Nominated	

== Sequel ==
A sequel titled Teraa Surroor was announced in December 2015. The film stars Himesh Reshammiya and Farah Karimaee in lead roles and was released on 11 March 2016.
