= Hijack (2008 film) =

2008 Indian film by Kunal Shivdasani

- Theatrical release poster
- Directed by: Kunal Shivdasani
- Written by: Kunal Shivdasani; Gavendra Agarwal
- Produced by: Dinesh Vijan; Kunal Shivdasani
- Starring: Shiney Ahuja; Esha Deol; Ishita Chauhan; K K Raina; Mona Ambegaonkar
- Cinematography: Jehangir Choudhary
- Edited by: Kunal Shivdasani
- Music by: Justin Yesudas; Uday Kumar Ninjoor
- Production company: Eros International
- Release date: 5 September 2008
- Running time: 117 minutes
- Country: India
- Language: Hindi

Hijack is a 2008 Indian Hindi-language action thriller film written and directed by Kunal Shivdasani. It is based on the hijacking of Indian Airlines Flight 814. The film stars Shiney Ahuja and Esha Deol. The film was released on 5 September 2008.

== Plot ==
Vikram Madan (Shiney Ahuja) is a ground maintenance engineer at the Chandigarh Airport. His social life is limited to one friend, Rajeev, the security chief of the same airport. Vikram's daughter Priya (Ishitha Chauhan) is traveling with her teacher for a debate contest to Amritsar from Delhi. That flight gets hijacked by a group of six terrorists working for a man named Rasheed (KK Raina) who has been captured by the Indian police. The flight is forced to land at the Chandigarh Airport. These terrorists demand the release of Rasheed from the Indian Government or they threaten to kill the hostages inside the aircraft. Now Vikram is faced with a dilemma of being the only man who can sneak inside the aircraft and try to save the life of his daughter Priya. Once he breaches into the aircraft with the help of air hostess Saira (Esha Deol), he starts plotting and planning and killing the terrorists one by one. Some innocent passengers become the victims of the terrorists and die. However somehow Vikram and Saira together save the day.

== Cast ==
- Shiney Ahuja as Vikram Madan
- Esha Deol as Saira
- KK Raina as Rasheed
- Ishita Chauhan as Priya Madan
- Kush Sharma
- Mariah Gantois
- Mona Ambegaonkar as Simone
- Kaveri Jha as Pooja Madan
- Rasika Dugal as Neha
- Ujjwal Chopra
- Ashwin Dhar as Abraham
- Ankit Sagar as Umashankar Tripathi
- Satyajit Sharma as Rajesh Kumar
- Jagat Rawat as Sajid

== Music ==
The soundtrack was scored by debutante duo Justin Yesudas and Uday Kumar Ninjoor.

- Yaad Mein Aksar – KK
- Dekh Dekh – Sunidhi Chauhan, Suraj Jagan, Rap by Joi
- Koi Na Jaane – KK, Shilpa Rao
- Theme of Hijack – Suraj Jagan, Uday Kumar Ninjoor
- Aksar (Unplugged) – Shaan
- Dekh Dekh (Club Mix) – Sunidhi Chauhan, Joi
- Yaad Mein Aksar (Remix) – KK, Joi
- Yaad Mein Aksar (Sad) – Shaan
