= Bhakti Rathod =

Indian television actress

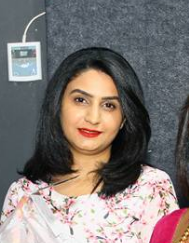
- Born: 6 July 1990 (age 36); Mumbai, Maharashtra, India
- Occupation: Actress
- Years active: 2001–present
- Spouse: Dhiraj R. Palshetkar (m. 2017)
- Parent(s): Neela Soni; Kannubhai Kannu Rathod

Bhakti Rathod is an Indian actress and theatre artist from Mumbai. Bhakti acted in Gujarati serial Pati Thayo Pati Gayo on Colors Gujarati. Bhakti made her debut in Dhollywood with film Haal Rupali ne peinwa opposite Hitu Kanodia in 2009. Bhakti also acted in rom-com web series. Her latest film is an international feature film, titled 'The Last Koan' in English and Hindi, which was released in 2019. She won the Gujarat Government State Award 2018 for her exceptional performance in Gujarati Movies.

== Early life ==
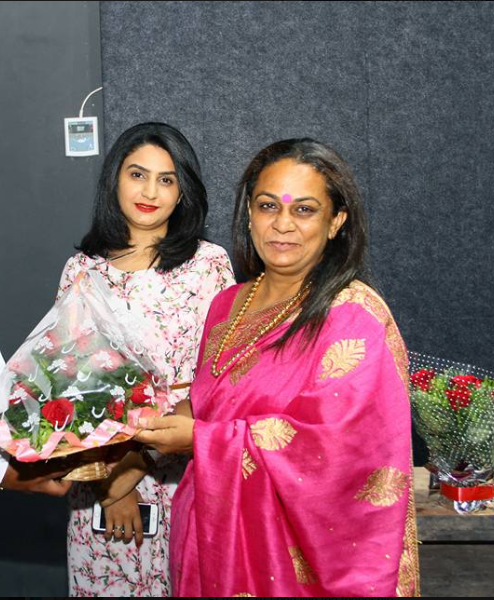
Bhakti Rathod with her mother Neela Soni

Bhakti's mother is Neela Soni who is a member of the Central Board of Film Certification and Vice President of the BJP North Mumbai. Her father is Kannubhai Kannu Rathod. She has a sister, Chitralekha Rathod, who is also an actress and model. Bhakti completed her education from Rustomjee Cambridge International School & Junior College, Dahisar, Mumbai and University of Mumbai.

== Career ==
Bhakti started her career as a child artist at the age of 11 in the year 2001 from hindi serials on Star Plus as Shobha Virani Choudhary, Mihir and Tulsi's daughter in Kyunki Saas Bhi Kabhi Bahu Thi and Des Mein Niklla Hoga Chand. She also starred in a number of notable Gujarati Plays namely 2Idiots, Bhari lau aankh ma zindagi, Baa Retire Thaay chhe, Adrashyam, Zero Bani Gayo Hero, Baa Mari Mother India, Family Ni Dandikuch, Saat Teri Ekvis & many more. Also a few (Gujarati) films - Aapne To Dhirubhai, Wassup Zindagi, Mr Jasoos. Bhakti got Best Theatre actress at the Tihai Gujarati Glamour Award 2014, for her play, '2 Idiots.' Bhakti acted in Gujarati serials Pati Thayo Pati Gayo, Kanho Banyo Common Man, and wrote two Gujarati plays Mr and Miss barot & Sasu vau ni 20-20. In 2017, Bhakti acted in the first ever Gujarati web-series Kacho Papad Pako Papad for SONY LIV. In 2020, Bhakti started working in Hindi serial Bhakharwadi.

== Filmography ==
=== Television ===
- Pati Thayo Pati Gayo
- Crime Patrol – 3 episodes
- Kyunki Saas Bhi Kabhi Bahu Thi
- Des Mein Niklla Hoga Chand
- Sajda Tere Pyaar Mein
- Preet Piyu Aane Pannaben
- Khichdi season 3 last episode as Dr
- Bhakharwadi as Urmila Thakkar
- Kuch Smiles Ho Jayein... With Alia as Urmila Thakkar
- Thoda Sa Badal Thoda Sa Pani as Anindita Basu Chatterjee
- Pushpa Impossible as Sonal Parekh
- Zyada Mat Udd as Jagrati Thakkar

=== Films ===
- Haal Rupali ne peinwa (2009)
- Aapne To Dhirubhai as Simran
- Wass…up! Zindagi as Purvi
- Gadar 2 - as an attender at the party
- Su Karisu (Gujarati film)
