= Ab Tumhare Hawale Watan Sathiyo =

- Theatrical release poster
- Directed by: Anil Sharma
- Written by: Shaktimaan Talwar
- Produced by: Anil Sharma; K. C. Sharma; Sanjay Sharma
- Starring: Amitabh Bachchan; Bobby Deol; Akshay Kumar; Divya Khosla; Sandali Sinha; Danny Denzongpa
- Cinematography: Kabir Lal
- Edited by: Ballu Saluja
- Music by: Anu Malik
- Production company: Movie World Studio Limited
- Release date: 24 December 2004
- Running time: 193 minutes
- Country: India
- Language: Hindi
- Budget: ₹200 million
- Box office: ₹191.6 million

Ab Tumhare Hawale Watan Sathiyo (transl. We entrust this nation in you, O countrymen) is a 2004 Indian Hindi-language war film directed by Anil Sharma. The film stars Amitabh Bachchan, Bobby Deol, Akshay Kumar, Divya Khosla, Sandali Sinha, Danny Denzongpa, Ashutosh Rana, Nagma and Aarti Chabaria.

Ab Tumhare Hawale Watan Sathiyo was released worldwide on 24 December 2004, coinciding with the Christmas weekend.

== Plot ==
Major General Amarjeet Singh is a dedicated officer for the Indian Army. His son Vikramjeet Singh follows in his footsteps and joins the Navy. In 1971, during the Indo-Pak war and the formation of Bangladesh, Lt. Commander Vikramjeet Singh had a ship under his command and a regiment of soldiers of the Indian Army, commandeered by his dad, Major General Amarjeet Singh. The ship comes under attack by a submarine of the Pakistani Navy, undergoes damage, and sinks along with Vikramjeet, but not before he courageously rescues about a hundred trapped army personnel.

Years later, Vikramjeet's son Kunaljeet joins the army as a captain, but he lacks the values his dad and grandfather had in them about serving the country selflessly. He just wants to be employed with the army for a couple of years, then re-locate to the U.S., run a business, and become rich. In order to accomplish this, he always makes up excuses for not going to the front. He falls in love with Shweta Bhansali and decides to stay in the army in order to be close to her. In order to achieve a medal, he fakes heroism, then carelessly jeopardizes a planned attack on terrorists, and as a result, many terrorists escape to their hideouts. Disciplined and chastised, an injured and humbled Kunaljeet waits to meet his sweetheart - only to find out that she is in love and married to his senior officer, Major Rajeev Kumar Singh, who was assumed to be dead but actually was a prisoner of war. The only thread binding him to the army is broken, and it is then Kunaljeet finds out that the terrorists, in collusion with rebel Pakistani officers, are planning to bomb the Bhagwan Shivji's Amarnath Temple in Jammu & Kashmir in order to foment communal strife. Kunaljeet saves everyone and wins his grandfather's heart.

== Cast ==
- Amitabh Bachchan as Retd. Major General Amarjeet Singh
- Nagma as Aarti Singh, Vikramjeet's wife.
- Akshay Kumar as Major Rajeev Kumar Singh
- Bobby Deol in a dual role as Capt. Kunaljeet "Kunal" Singh / Lt Cdr. Vikramjeet "Vikram" Singh
- Divya Khosla as Shweta Bhansali Singh, Rajeev's wife (Hindi dubbed voice as Mona Ghosh Shetty)
- Sandali Sinha as Captain Dr Sakshi Pant, Kunal's friend, later girlfriend.
- Danny Denzongpa as Col. Ashfaque Khan
- Kapil Sharma as Captain Trilok
- Ashutosh Rana as Lieutenant General Sikander Khan (Based on his Shoulder Badge)
- Govind Namdeo as Maqbool Butt
- Aarti Chabria as Trilok's wife
- Vishwajeet Pradhan as Subedar Abdul
- Nawab Shah (actor) as Abu Hamza
- Vivek Shauq as Col Abhay Sodhi
- Surendra Pal as Brigadier Rakesh Malhotra
- Arif Zakaria as Singer AK Singh
- Rajesh Vivek as Col Raghav Bhansali
- B N Sharma as Police Man
- Master Utkarsh Sharma as child Vikramjeet

== Soundtrack ==
Ab Tumhare Hawale Watan Saathiyo

Soundtrack album by Anu Malik
- Released: 2004
- Genre: Feature film soundtrack
- Label: T-Series

The film's music was composed by Anu Malik, with lyrics written by Sameer.

=== Track listing ===
No.	Title	Singer(s)	Length
1.	"Ab Tumhare Hawale Watan Sathiyo (Hum Fauji Iss Desh Ki Dhadkan Hai)"	Udit Narayan , Alka Yagnik, Kailash Kher, Sonu Nigam,	7:38
2.	"Ab Tumhare Hawale Watan Sathiyo - II"	Udit Narayan, Sonu Nigam	6:51
3.	"Chali Aa Chali Aa"	Alka Yagnik, Sonu Nigam	7:12
4.	"Dil Rota Hai Baar Baar"	Sonu Nigam	4:38
5.	"Humein Tumse Hua Hai Pyaar"	Udit Narayan, Alka Yagnik	6:03
6.	"Kurti Malmal Di"	Anuradha Paudwal, Kailash Kher, Sneha Pant, Sonu Nigam, Sudesh Bhosle	7:11
7.	"Mere Sarpe Dupatta"	Udit Narayan, Alka Yagnik, Jaspinder Narula,	5:30
8.	"Mujhe Pyaar Do"	Anuradha Paudwal, Karsan Sargathia, Sonu Nigam	6:04
9.	"Shivji Satya Hai"	Sonu Nigam, Sukhwinder Singh	7:38

== Reception ==
Taran Adarsh of IndiaFM gave the film two out of five, writing, "On the whole, AB TUMHARE HAWALE WATAN SATHIYO falls way below expectations. At the box-office, it will meet with mixed reactions. While the masses wouldn't mind it, the classes, especially the family audiences, would give it a cold shoulder." Patcy N of Rediff wrote, "The film's music is average. Divya Khosla doesn't have much to so and acts well in a few sequences. Akshay gets the applause, not for his acting but for his well-written shayari. Bobby is good. Amitabh Bachchan is seen far too often in these officer roles and has nothing at all new to offer in this uniformed outing. He has started looking and acting very monotonous."

== Awards and nominations ==
Year	Award	Category	Recipient	Result	Ref.
2005	Bollywood Movie Award	Best Female Debut	Divya Khosla	Nominated	
