= Farz (2001 film) =

2001 film by Raj Kanwar

- Theatrical release poster
- Directed by: Raj Kanwar
- Screenplay by: Sutanu Gupta
- Dialogues by: Kamlesh Pandey
- Story by: Raj Kanwar
- Produced by: Sunil Saini
- Starring: Sunny Deol; Preity Zinta; Jackie Shroff; Om Puri; Dara Singh; Mukesh Tiwari
- Cinematography: Ishwar Bidri
- Edited by: Kuldip Mehan
- Music by: Songs: Uttam Singh Anu Malik; Score: Aadesh Shrivastava
- Production company: Vishant International
- Distributed by: T-Series
- Release date: 12 January 2001
- Running time: 178 min.
- Country: India
- Language: Hindi
- Box office: ₹19.92 crore (India Net Collection)

Farz (transl. Duty) is a 2001 Indian Hindi-language action thriller film directed by Raj Kanwar, starring Sunny Deol, Preity Zinta, Jackie Shroff, Om Puri, Dara Singh and Mukesh Tiwari. The film was released on 12 January 2001.

== Plot ==
Mumbai is being terrorized by a criminal, Gawa Firozi, and his brother, Sikandar. ACP Arjun Singh and his closest friend and senior colleague, ACP Balwant Singh are Maharashtra Police Service officers working with the crime branch of the city's police department, but when Balwant is killed, Arjun is devastated by his death. Arjun is fearful that the same person who killed his friend will come after him or his family.

While Arjun is still mourning Balwant's death, he is told that a new officer ACP Karan Singh will be joining the post vacated by Balwant’s death. Just the next day at work, Arjun is informed that some criminals have entered a college and have taken some students as hostages including his daughter, Kajal. Arjun reaches the spot and while he is negotiating with the assailants, Karan storms into the building and single-handedly wipes out all the perpetrators and manages to save Kajal, who instantly falls in love with him. Arjun is not happy with Karan's methods of dealing with criminals. To cap Arjun's frustrations, Karan starts reciprocating Kajal's feelings.

Over the next few days, Karan and Arjun raid several hideouts and illicit ammunition factories belonging to Gawa and Sikandar but are unable to do much since Sikandar is an influential person in the city. One day Kajal's friend who was in an illicit relationship with Sikandar, is killed by him. While escaping, Sikandar bumps into Kajal who informs Karan and Arjun about the murder. Karan asks Kajal to identify the killer. However, Arjun advises against it.

Meanwhile Karan and Kajal get married. On their first night, the couple is attacked by Sikandar and his cronies. They manage to escape and Karan captures Sikandar, presenting him before the judge the next day. While Sikandar is being transferred to the prison, Gawa attacks the police convoy and frees Sikandar. A gunfight ensues, and Karan kills Sikandar but is unable to kill Gawa. Gawa is captured and vows to avenge his brother's death while Karan gets promoted to DCP.

Some time later, Gawa manages to escape by faking his own death. Karan and Kajal are shown to be doting on an orphan named Kabir and are good friends with Kabir's guardian, a catholic priest who runs an orphanage. Gawa murders the priest and writes a fake suicide note which says that the priest, with Karan's help ran the orphanage as a front for child trafficking. As a result, DCP Karan Singh is set to face a CBI enquiry.

Gawa then starts showing up in front of Karan and even enters his house and drugs and molests Kajal when she's alone one night. These events take a heavy toll on Karan's life, driving him to near madness. To top it all, Karan is suspended from service and takes to drinking. Karan's informer Taxi who worked for Gawa earlier, sympathizes with him since he wants revenge for his brother, who was killed by Gawa. One night, when Karan is roaming around in a drunken state along with Taxi, the duo sense that they are being followed. Taxi realizes that it's Gawa who's following them and raises the alarm. But Gawa shoots Taxi and escapes after throwing the gun at Karan, framing him for the murder.

Karan now finds himself in a tight spot, dealing with his crumbling marriage, his duty-bound father-in-law who is leaving no stone unturned to get him and worst of all, Gawa Firozi, who is still roaming scot-free. Only Rukmani, who considers Karan as her own son openly states that she believes he is innocent and will support him no matter what. Somehow, Karan is able to meet Kajal in the temple. Kajal tells him that she still believes in him and knows that he is innocent. Karan tells her that he is going after Gawa Firozi. Just as they finish their conversation, Arjun lays siege to the temple ordering Karan to surrender. However, Kajal intervenes just as Arjun points a gun at Karan, and Karan escapes, leaving Arjun fuming.

Kabir informs Karan that Kajal has been kidnapped by Gawa Firozi. Furious, Karan infiltrates Gawa's hideout, killing many of his henchmen and finds Kajal tied up. Karan fights Gawa and gains the upper hand and beats up Gawa. Karan saves Kajal and chases Gawa who has boarded a helicopter. Karan manages to cling on the threshold of the helicopter and it takes off just as Arjun arrives at the scene with a huge police force in tow. During the fight Karan jumps off taking Gawa down along with him. Karan latches on a hanging cable while letting go of Gawa. As a result, Gawa lands onto a minefield below which blows up, killing him for once and for all. Karan and Kajal reunite and Arjun finally endorses Karan’s actions.

== Cast ==
- Sunny Deol as DCP Karan Singh
- Preity Zinta as Kajal Singh – Karan’s girlfriend, later wife
- Jackie Shroff as Gawa Firozi
- Om Puri as ACP Arjun Singh
- Farida Jalal as Rukmani Singh
- Dara Singh as ACP Balwant Singh – Arjun’s superior and family friend
- Mukesh Tiwari as Sikandar Firozi – Gawa’s brother
- Johnny Lever as Bulbul
- Pooja Batra (special appearance) as Dancer – In song
- Achyut Potdar as Police Commissioner

== Production ==
The outdoor scenes of Farz were shot in Bernese Oberland in central Switzerland. The film was made on a budget of $3 million.

== Music ==
The music was composed by Uttam Singh with the lyrics penned by Sameer. The background score was composed by Aadesh Shrivastava.

Farz

Soundtrack album by Uttam Singh Anu Malik Aadesh Shrivastava
- Released: 18 November 2000
- Genre: Feature film soundtrack
- Label: T-Series

No.	Title	Singer(s)	Music director(s)
1	"Dekhen Bhi To Kya Dekhen"	Udit Narayan, Lata Mangeshkar	Uttam Singh
2	"Mohabbat Ke Din Ho"	Udit Narayan, Alka Yagnik	Anu Malik
3	"Jadoo Hai Yeh Kaisa"	Sonu Nigam, Anuradha Paudwal	Uttam Singh
4	"Har Subah Yaad Rakhna"	Udit Narayan, Lata Mangeshkar	Uttam Singh
5	"Bichua Bichua"	Anupama Deshpande	Uttam Singh
6	"Saare Sheher Mein"	KK, Sunidhi Chauhan, Richa Sharma	Aadesh Shrivastava
7	"Dhola Dhola"	Sonu Nigam, Anuradha Paudwal	Uttam Singh
8	"Aelo Aelo Ji"	Udit Narayan, Alka Yagnik	Uttam Singh
9	"Anjaane (Solo Version)"	Vital Signs	Uttam Singh
10	"Anjaane (Duet Version)"	Vital Signs, Lata Mangeshkar, Alka Yagnik	Uttam Singh

== Reception ==
Suparn Verma of Rediff criticised the film for being heavily influenced by Lethal Weapon and Ricochet including the climax scene from Metro. Nikhat Kazmi of Filmfare rated it 2.5 out of 5 stars.

== See also ==
- Dhakaiya Mastan, 2002 Bangladeshi remake
