= Pyaar Diwana Hota Hai =

- DVD Cover
- Directed by: Kirti Kumar
- Screenplay by: S. M. Ahale; Javed Siddiqui (dialogues)
- Story by: Sasi
- Based on: Sollamale
- Produced by: R. B. Choudary
- Starring: Govinda; Rani Mukerji
- Cinematography: Peter Perrira
- Music by: Songs: Uttam Singh; Score: Bobby
- Release date: 26 April 2002
- Running time: 161 mins
- Country: India
- Language: Hindi

Pyaar Diwana Hota Hai (transl. Love Is Crazy) is a 2002 Indian Hindi-language romantic comedy film directed by Kirti Kumar, starring Govinda and Rani Mukerji. It is a remake of the Tamil film Sollamale (1998).

== Plot ==
Sunder leaves his village for the city, where he is naïve, illiterate, and easily influenced. His clumsy attempts to impress women are ridiculed, while his roommates mock and ignore him.

One day, he befriends NRI Payal Khurana, who mistakenly believes he is mute and disabled. Feeling sympathy for him, she resolves to help him recover his voice and takes him to Dr. S. Puri, who is unable to cure him. Delighted by the affection and attention Payal shows him, Sunder chooses to maintain the deception, aware that her concern stems from pity rather than love and that she will soon return overseas.

Unbeknownst to Sunder, Payal gradually falls in love with him. She begins introducing him to her family, arranging meetings with her aunt, Mrs. Chaudhary, and later with her parents.

In the end, determined to remain true to his deception and unable to confess the truth, Sunder cuts off his tongue.

== Cast ==
- Govinda ... Sunder
- Rani Mukerji ... Payal Khurana
- Apurva Agnihotri ... Vikram
- Deepak Tijori ... Riaz
- Laxmikant Berde... Wills
- Om Puri ... Dr.S.Puri
- Smita Jaykar ... Mrs. Khurana
- Navin Nischol... Mr. Khurana
- Johnny Lever ... Paresh Chaval (Painter)
- Farida Jalal ... Mrs. Chaudhary
- Rambha ... (Special appearance in "Pyaar Achha Hota Hai")
- Vikas Sharma...Maganlal "Maggu" Kartik

== Soundtrack ==
Music by Uttam Singh. The song "Pyaar Diwana Hota Hai" was based on "Adi Sugama" from Kadhal Sugamanathu also produced by R. B. Choudary.

#	Title	Singer(s)
1	"Pyaar Diwana Hota Hai"	Udit Narayan, Kavita Krishnamurthy
2	"Deewane Dil"	Hariharan, Preeti Uttam
3	"Pyaar Achha Hota Hai"	Jaspinder Narula
4	"Teri Aankhen Bolti"	Vinod Rathod, Alka Yagnik
5	"Yeh Kya Jadoo"	Udit Narayan
6	"Dil Tera Mera Dil"	Sonu Nigam, Alka Yagnik
7	"Pyaar Diwana Hota Hai"	Instrumental
