= Gadar 2 =

2023 Indian film by Anil Sharma

- Theatrical release poster
- Directed by: Anil Sharma
- Written by: Shaktimaan Talwar
- Produced by: Anil Sharma; Kamal Mukut
- Starring: Sunny Deol; Ameesha Patel; Utkarsh Sharma; Simrat Kaur; Gaurav Chopra; Manish Wadhwa
- Narrated by: Nana Patekar
- Cinematography: Najeeb Khan
- Edited by: Ashfaque Makrani; Sanjay Sankla
- Music by: Score: Monty Sharma; Songs: Mithoon; Monty Sharma; Uttam Singh (uncredited)
- Production company: Zee Studios
- Distributed by: Zee Studios
- Release date: 11 August 2023
- Running time: 173 minutes
- Country: India
- Language: Hindi
- Budget: ₹60 crore
- Box office: ₹691.08 crore

Gadar 2 (transl. Rebellion 2), subtitled on-screen with The Katha Continues, is a 2023 Indian Hindi-language period action drama film directed by Anil Sharma and written by Shaktimaan Talwar. The sequel to Gadar: Ek Prem Katha (2001), it stars Sunny Deol, Ameesha Patel, and Utkarsh Sharma, all reprising their lead roles from the original, with Simrat Kaur, Manisha Wadhwa, and Gaurav Chopra.

During the Indo-Pakistani War of 1971, Tara Singh returns to India and Pakistan in order to rescue his imprisoned son Jeete.

Gadar 2 was theatrically released on 11 August 2023, and received mixed reviews from critics. It emerged as a major commercial success, grossing over ₹691.08 crore (US$72 million) worldwide against a production budget of ₹60 crore (US$6.3 million), becoming the fourth highest-grossing Indian film of 2023, the tenth highest-grossing Hindi film of all-time, and the fifth highest-grossing Hindi film in India.

== Plot ==
In 1954, Hamid Iqbal, the Major-General of Pakistan Army, wants to exact vengeance on Tara Singh for eliminating his 40 soldiers during Tara's escape from Pakistan with his wife Sakeena and his son Charanjeet "Jeete". (Note: As depicted in Gadar: Ek Prem Katha (2001).) Iqbal gets Sakeena's father Ashraf Ali executed for aiding Tara in his escape to India.

In 1971, Tara, a goods supplier to the Indian Army cantonment, lives with Sakeena and Jeete, who soon leaves for Chandigarh for his studies. One day, Tara is contacted by Lt. Colonel Devendra Rawat for help in supplying Indian soldiers with weapons as a skirmish is taking place with the Pakistani soldiers at the border during the Third Indo-Pak War. After reaching there, Tara is spotted by Iqbal, who orders an explosion at the border, leading to many of the soldiers getting captured. Jeete returns from Chandigarh to find Sakeena in shambles. Upon learning about Tara's disappearance at the border, Jeete leaves for Pakistan against everyone's wishes to rescue Tara.

After arriving in Pakistan, Jeete meets Tara's close friend Gul Khan, who helps him secure a job at Kurban Khan's hotel, which supplies food to the captive Indian soldiers. Jeete meets and gets close to Kurban's daughter Muskaan, who continues to support him upon learning that Jeete is an Indian and had come there to rescue his father. Jeete infiltrates the prison only to get captured and discovers that Tara was never captured. On the other hand, Tara resurfaces in Indian Punjab and reunites with Sakeena, revealing that he fell into a stream and was rescued by a Bakarwal tribe, but went into a coma. Upon learning that Jeete is in Pakistan and his communication has stopped, Tara leaves for Pakistan to extract Jeete from prison.

Landing in Pakistan, Tara meets Gul Khan and learns about Jeete's capture. Iqbal beats up Jeete and gets him publicly humiliated by falsely accusing him of assaulting Muskaan, who is forced to lie to protect Kurban. However, Tara arrives and escapes with Jeete amidst the Pakistani army. Yahya Khan, the President of Pakistan and the Commander-in-chief of the Pakistan Army, orders a humiliated Iqbal to capture Tara within 72 hours. Tara and his team contact Sakeena, but are chased by Iqbal's men, eventually getting separated. Following a series of combats and chases, Tara and Jeete finally reunite and are on their way to leave Pakistan when Muskaan and Kurban Khan show up with their family, who are planning to leave for Balochistan.

Kurban Khan asks Tara to accept Muskaan as Jeete's bride, to which Jeete and Tara happily agree. However, Iqbal captures them in an ambush and kills Muskaan's brother Farid. Iqbal tries to execute them but Tara frees himself and with Jeete fights the army singlehandedly, escaping with everybody in an army tank. They arrive at the Indian border, where Iqbal again tries to kill Tara, but is gunned down by Rawat and the Indian soldiers. Rawat approves Jeete to enlist in the army, while Tara, Jeete and Muskaan reunite with Sakeena.

== Cast ==
- Sunny Deol as Tara Singh, Sakeena's husband, Jeete's father
- Ameesha Patel as Sakeena Ali Singh, Tara's wife, Jeete's mother
- Utkarsh Sharma as Charanjeet "Jeete" Singh, Tara’s and Sakeena's son
- Simrat Kaur as Muskaan, Charanjeet's love interest
- Gaurav Chopra as Lt. Col. Devendra Rawat
- Manish Wadhwa as Hamid Iqbal, Major-General of Pakistan Army
- Manoj Bakshi as Yahya Khan, President of Pakistan and Commander-in-Chief of the Pakistan Army
- Aarya Sharma as General Rani
- Luv Sinha as Farid, Muskaan's brother
- Bhakti Rathod
- Rohit Chaudhary as Major Malik
- Madhumalti Kapoor as Tayiji
- Rakesh Bedi as Kimtilal
- Mushtaq Khan as Gulkhan
- Dolly Bindra as Samira Khan, Gulkhan's Wife
- Rajshree as Tayiji's daughter-in-law
- Naresh Sharma as Tayiji's son
- Mushtaq Kak as Kurban Khan
- Nilofar Gesawat as Kurban Khan's wife
- Akash Dhar as Major Bhargav
- Lubna Salim as Pakistani "Aunt"
- Ehsan Khan as Abdul Ali
- Anamika Singh as Fauziya
- Abrar Zahoor as Anwar
- Anil George as Qazi
- Arjun Dwivedi as Jailor
- Rajesh Khera as Col. Nazeer of Pakistan Army
- Rumi Khan as Col. Farooqui of Pakistan Army
- Muneesh Sappal as Pakistani Minister
- Pramod Pandey as Rehmani
- Amrish Puri as Ashraf Ali (archive footage/CGI)
- Vivek Shauq as Darmiyaan Singh (archive footage/CGI)

== Production ==
=== Development ===
Zee Studios, Sunny Deol, Ameesha Patel and Utkarsh Sharma officially announced Gadar 2: The Katha Continues on 15 October 2021 (Dusshera) on their social media accounts, revealing the release date 2022 with motion poster. The first poster of the sequel titled Gadar 2 was unveiled on 26 January 2023 (Republic Day) and it shows Tara Singh, played by Sunny, with a hammer.

=== Casting ===
Sunny Deol reprises his role of Tara Singh, but was initially hesitant about revisiting the role, believing that films like Gadar: Ek Prem Katha can be made only once in history. He states, "We had made Gadar but the audience made it a Blockbuster. Initially, I was a bit apprehensive about whether we would do justice and continue the legacy of the first part." The film's director Anil Sharma revealed how he convinced Deol to return, stating, "When I narrated Gadar 2, Sunny was a little hesitant because he felt Gadar was a blockbuster and didn't want to meddle with it. But I requested him that the entire nation has been requesting a sequel and we should respect their emotions. After many calls, he finally agreed to hear the story. When we sat down for narration and finished it, he had tears in his eyes. That's how the journey of Gadar 2 started."

Ameesha Patel and Utkarsh Sharma also reprise their roles of Sakeena and Charanjeet "Jeete" Singh from the first film. Simrat Kaur was also cast for the film. Manish Wadhwa was offered the role of a Pakistani army general in the film. Rohit Choudhary, was also cast in the role of a Pakistani army general in the film. Luv Sinha and Gaurav Chopra have also been cast in important role. The shoot of the film was wrapped up by May 2023. Writer Shaktimaan revealed the character of Gul Khan played by Mushtaq Khan was based on a real person Qasi Sahab who gave his father shelter in his home during the communal riots.

Ashraf Ali, Sakeena's father, played by Amrish Puri in the first film; also appears in this film. Puri died in 2005 and his likeness was used to bring back the character through archive footage from Gadar: Ek Prem Katha and computer-generated imagery.

The director wanted to cast an authentic Punjabi face (with a Punjabi cultural touch) to this film, and hence they approached a few Punjabi actresses. Nimrat Khaira was the first to be approached but she let off this offer of getting into Bollywood to oppose the silence of Bollywood on the then ongoing Farm Laws .

The directors then tried Simi Chahal for the same role and again got rejected due to the same reason . The rejections were also due to the backlash Ammy Virk was facing due to his collaboration on a couple of bollywood films at the same time.

The last resort of the directors was launching a Punjabi face that has never been to Punjab, as most of the known Punjabi faces were rejecting Bollywood projects due to fear of backlash.

== Music and soundtrack ==
The background score of the movie was done by Monty Sharma. The music for the film's songs was composed and recreated by Mithoon and Monty Sharma, over the original music previously composed for a couple of songs by Uttam Singh (uncredited). The lyrics of the songs were penned by Sayeed Quadri and Sunil Sirvaiya, and a couple of old songs were used whose lyrics were previously penned by Anand Bakshi (uncredited).

Udit Narayan and Alka Yagnik reprise their roles as the singing voices of Deol and Patel, respectively. The first single titled "Udd Jaa Kaale Kaava" was released on 29 June 2023. The second single titled "Khairiyat" was released on 9 July 2023. The third single titled "Main Nikla Gaddi Leke" was released on 20 July 2023. The soundtrack album released by Zee Music Company on 4 August 2023, followed by an extended album on 8 September 2023.

== Release ==
Gadar 2 was theatrically released on 11 August 2023. The box-office response prompted several cinemas to play post-midnight and early morning shows of the film.

=== Home media ===
The film was premiered on ZEE5 from 6 October 2023. It enjoyed a highly successful launch, quickly topping global viewership charts upon its release.

== Reception ==
=== Box office ===
On its opening day, Gadar 2 collected a total India net of ₹40.10 crore (US$4.2 million). In its first weekend, it collected over ₹134.88 crore (US$14 million), making it ninth top opening weekend for Hindi films.

As of 14 September 2023, the film has grossed ₹625.54 crore (US$66 million) in India, with a further ₹65.54 crore (US$6.9 million) in overseas, for a worldwide total of ₹691.08 crore (US$72 million).

=== Critical response ===
On the review aggregator website Rotten Tomatoes, 17% of 12 critics' reviews are positive, with an average rating of 4.2/10.

Taran Adarsh gave the film 4.5/5 stars and wrote “Gadar 2 is old-school desi entertainment at its best. Sunny Deol returns to the big screen with a vengeance… He is as ferocious as ever. The patriotic flavour coupled with tremendous recall value will make it a huge money-spinner. Gadar 2 lives up to massive expectations… Has it all: drama, emotions, action, two beautiful songs [from the first part] and the hand pump sequence, of course. Anil Sharma makes sure he packs every ingredient on the shelf to create a big-screen entertainer.”

Anindita Mukherjee from India Today gave 3.5/5 stars and wrote "Gadar 2 supersedes expectations, as it successfully tugs at your heartstrings. And there's Sunny Paaji to do all the heavy-lifting (pun intended). Shubhra Gupta of The Indian Express gave 1.5/5 stars and wrote "What we can confirm is that Sunny paaji can still snarl effectively, and that dhai-kilo-ka-haath has residual potency. We can also confirm the reappearance of a hand-pump.

Anuj Kumar from The Hindu wrote "It is not as provocative as the original as driver Anil Sharma seeks to take a middle path. Perhaps, it feels like that because the socio-political atmosphere outside the theatre has become much more dramatic and shrill than what it was when the original released in 2001. Still, it is good that Sharma has toned down the jingoistic tone." Komal Nahta said that "Gadar 2’ is not a film, its a celebration, an emotion that touches the heart of every Indian." Monika Rawal Kukreja of Hindustan Times wrote "Gadar 2 does falter in terms of story and its pace, though it brings back the mass entertainment and that can surely make it a paisa vasool watch."

Gadar 2 also became the first film screened for Lok Sabha members in the New Parliament building.

== Impact ==
Gadar 2 has had a profound impact, tapping into nostalgia while simultaneously aligning with the patriotic fervor. The film’s storyline, set 22 years after Gadar Ek Prem Katha, brings back iconic characters like Sakeena and Tara, alongside unforgettable moments such as the handpump scene and the classic Main Nikla Gaddi Leke song. These nostalgic elements are reintroduced, creating a sense of continuity and allowing audiences to relive the magic of the first film.

At screenings of the movie, slogans like Hindustan Zindabad and Bharat Mata Ki Jai were raised in unison by the audience. One of the film’s key dialogues, “Ghazwa-e-Hind nahi, yeh Jazba-e-Hind hai,” captures its central theme of patriotism and national unity.

Gadar 2 has also had a significant impact on cinema-going habits, particularly in single-screen theaters. A Live Mint report highlighted that some single-screen cinemas have gone so far as to add shows as early as 1:00 am and 4:30 am to accommodate the overwhelming demand from audiences.

The weekend releases of Jailer, Gadar 2, Bholaa Shankar, and OMG 2 had a massive impact on the Indian box office, contributing over Rs 390 crore to the industry's gross earnings. This marked one of the busiest weekends in recent cinema history, with over 2.10 crore moviegoers attending screenings across the country. The weekend also saw a record-breaking footfall of more than 82 lakh moviegoers. According to a joint statement by the Multiplex Association of India (MAI) and the Producers Guild of India, the remarkable box-office success over the weekend was a testament to the power of mainstream storytelling done right.

== Accolades ==
Award	Ceremony date	Category	Recipients	Result	Ref.
Filmfare Awards	28 January 2024	Best Actor	Sunny Deol	Nominated	
Filmfare Awards	28 January 2024	Best Action	Ravi Varma, Shaam Kaushal, Abbas Ali Moghul and Tinu Verma	Nominated	
Filmfare Awards	28 January 2024	Best Special Effects	Prisca, Pixel Studios	Nominated	
International Indian Film Academy Awards	28 September 2024	Best Actor	Sunny Deol	Nominated	
Zee Cine Awards	2024	Best Film	Gadar 2	Won	
Zee Cine Awards	2024	Best Actor (Viewers' choice)	Sunny Deol	Won	
Zee Cine Awards	2024	Best Dialogue	Shaktimaan Talwar	Won	
Zee Cine Awards	2024	Best Sound Design	Jitendra Chaudhary	Won	
Zee Cine Awards	2024	Best Actor (Jury's Choice)	Sunny Deol	Nominated	
Zee Cine Awards	2024	Best Supporting Actress	Ameesha Patel	Nominated	
Zee Cine Awards	2024	Best Actor in a Negative Role	Manish Wadhwa	Nominated	
Lions Gold Awards	2023	Best Debut Actress	Simrat Kaur Randhawa	Won	
Iconic Gold Awards	2024	Game Changer Movie of the Year	Anil Sharma	Won	
Iconic Gold Awards	2024	Singer of the Year	Udit Narayan	Won	
Pinkvilla Style Icons Awards	2024	Best Film - Popular Choice	Gadar 2	Nominated	
Pinkvilla Style Icons Awards	2024	Best Director - Popular Choice	Anil Sharma	Nominated	
Pinkvilla Style Icons Awards	2024	Best Actor - Male - Popular Choice	Sunny Deol	Nominated	
Pinkvilla Style Icons Awards	2024	Outstanding Contribution To Cinema	Anil Sharma	Won	
Pinkvilla Style Icons Awards	2024	Best Actor in a Negative Role	Manish Wadhwa	Nominated	
NDTV Indian of the Year	2024	Entertainer of the Year	Sunny Deol	Won	

== Sequel ==
A sequel was announced during the end credits. Anil Sharma said "You'll have to wait for that. The fruit of patience is sweet, just like this one (Gadar 2). Some thoughts have come to me and Shaktimaan Ji's minds. So just wait everything will happen.”
