= Uttam Singh =

- Born: 25 May 1948 (age 78)
- Origin: Punjab, India
- Genres: Bollywood music, semi classical, classical, Indian music, Punjabi regional folk
- Occupations: Violinist, composer, musician
- Instrument: Violin

Uttam Singh (born 25 May 1948) is an Indian music director and a well-known violinist. He has also worked as a music arranger, programmer and recordist for many Bollywood films. He worked as a music assistant for Ilaiyaraaja in numerous Tamil films before establishing himself as an independent composer.

== Music career ==
=== Childhood ===
Uttam Singh's father was a sitar player. His family moved to Mumbai, when Singh was 12. He learned tabla and Western violin. His family used to sing kirtans at various Gurudwaras and religious functions to supplement their income.

=== Violinist ===
Uttam Singh worked as violinist for three years. His big break came in 1963, when he worked as a violinist for a documentary being made by Mohammad Safi (an assistant to Naushad). After this, Uttam Singh played violin for major composers including Naushad, Roshan, Madan Mohan, C. Ramchandra, Sachin Dev Burman. Later, he became the main violinist for S D Burman's son, Rahul Dev Burman.

=== Music arranger ===
Singh later partnered with another musician, Jagdish, to arrange music for films. The duo became reputed arrangers, working for over 65 films in several Indian languages. These films included major Rajshri Productions hits, Maine Pyar Kiya and Hum Aapke Hain Koun..!. He also worked with Ilaiyaraaja as a music arranger in various Tamil films.

=== Music director ===
Singh and Jagdish worked as music directors ("Uttam-Jagdish") for Manoj Kumar's Painter Babu (1983). Later they worked for Kumar's other film, Clerk (1989). Together, they also worked on the Smita Patil-Raj Babbar-Raj Kiran-Amrita Singh-Amrish Puri starrer, Waaris (1988). After Jagdish died in 1992, Singh started working independently. His most notable film as a music director was Yash Chopra's Dil To Pagal Hai (1997). He also composed music for many other films including Dushman (1998), Hum Tum Pe Marte Hain (1999), Farz (2001) and Pyaar Diwana Hota Hai (2002). He also composed music for Anil Sharma's Gadar: Ek Prem Katha (2001) and later for The Hero: Love Story of a Spy (2003).

His songs and score for the Chandra Prakash Dwivedi's 2003 partition drama Pinjar, in which he collaborated with the Wadali Brothers, won him much critical acclaim and is considered to be his finest work as composer.

=== Private albums ===
Singh recorded his first private album Om Sai Ram in 1996. Later, he also composed music for his daughter Preeti Singh's album Soor (2002).

== Filmography ==
| Year | Film | Role | Notes | Album sales |
|---|---|---|---|---|
| 2023 | Gadar 2 | Music Director | Recreated songs from original soundtrack | |
| 2015 | Nanak Shah Fakir | Music Director | | |
| 2014 | Honour Killing | Music Director | | |
| 2013 | Rajjo | Composer & Background Score | | |
| 2006 | Kachchi Sadak | Composer | | |
| 2005 | Taj Mahal: An Eternal Love Story | Background Score | | |
| 2005 | Ho Jatta Hai Pyar | Composer | | |
| 2005 | Hum Jo Keh Na Paaye | Composer | Television | |
| 2003 | Baghban | Composer | | 14,00,000 |
| 2003 | The Hero: Love Story of a Spy | Composer | | |
| 2003 | Pinjar | Composer & Background Score | Nominated: Apsara Award for Best Music Director Nominated: Screen Award for Best Background Music; Nominated: Zee Cine Award for Best Background Music | |
| 2002 | Pyaar Diwana Hota Hai | Composer | | |
| 2002 | Hum Tumhare Hain Sanam | Background Score | | 20,00,000 |
| 2001 | Gadar: Ek Prem Katha | Composer & Background Score | Nominated: Filmfare Award for Best Music Director; Nominated: IIFA Award for Best Music Director; Nominated: Screen Award for Best Music Director | 2,500,000 |
| 2001 | Farz | Composer | | |
| 1999 | Prem Poojari | Composer | Malayalam Film | |
| 1999 | Hum Tum Pe Marte Hain | Composer | | |
| 1998 | Dushman | Composer | | |
| 1997 | Dil To Pagal Hai | Composer | Won: Filmfare Award for Best Music Director; Won: Zee Cine Award for Best Music Director Nominated: Zee Cine Awards for Best Background Score Nominated: Screen Awards for Best Music Director | 12,500,000 |
| 1995 | Guddu | Music Assistant | | |
| 1994 | Karan | Music Assistant | | |
| 1994 | Prem Shakti | Music Arranger | | |
| 1994 | Jazbaat | Composer | | |
| 1994 | Andaz Apna Apna | Music Assistant | | |
| 1994 | Hum Aapke Hain Koun..! | Music Arranger | | |
| 1993 | Pyaar Ka Tarana | Music Assistant | | |
| 1993 | Anmol | Music Arranger | | |
| 1992 | Mehndi Shagna Di | Composer (Punjabi Movie) | with Jagdish ("Uttam-Jagdish") | |
| 1992 | Farishtay | Background Score | | |
| 1991 | Patthar | Music Assistant | | |
| 1991 | Benaam Badsha | Music Arranger | | |
| 1991 | Patthar Ke Phool | Music Arranger | | |
| 1990 | Shiva | Song Mixer | | |
| 1989 | Maine Pyar Kiya | Music Arranger | | |
| 1989 | Gawaahi | Composer | with Jagdish ("Uttam-Jagdish") | |
| 1989 | Clerk | Composer | with Jagdish ("Uttam-Jagdish") | |
| 1988 | Paanch Fauladi | Composer | with Jagdish ("Uttam-Jagdish") | |
| 1988 | Kabrastan | Composer | with Jagdish ("Uttam-Jagdish") | |
| 1988 | Waaris | Composer | with Jagdish ("Uttam-Jagdish") | |
| 1986 | Teesra Kinara | Composer | with Jagdish ("Uttam-Jagdish") | |
| 1985 | Khamosh | Music Assistant | | |
| 1984 | Purana Mandir | Music Assistant | | |
| 1983 | Mandi | Music Assistant | | |
| 1983 | Painter Babu | Composer | with Jagdish ("Uttam-Jagdish") | |
| 1983 | Dard-E-Dil | Music Assistant | | |
| 1982 | Nek Parveen | Music Assistant | | |
| 1982 | Dharam Kanta | Music Assistant | | |
| 1981 | 36 Chowringhee Lane | Music Assistant | | |
| 1981 | Jiyo To Aise Jiyo | Music Assistant | with Ram Laxhman | |
| 1981 | Josh Jawani Da | Music Assistant | with Om Verma (Punjabi Movie) | |
| 1980 | Chann Pardesi | Composer (Punjabi Movie) | | |
| 1979 | Habari | Music Assistant | with Sapan Jagmohan | |
| 1978 | Udeekan | Music Assistant, Background Music | with Om Verma (Punjabi Movie) | |
| 1977 | Lachhi | Music Assistant | | |
| 1977 | Pandit Aur Pathan | Music Assistant | with Sonik Omi | |
| 1977 | Aaina | Music Assistant | | |
| 1973 | Teen Chor | | with Sonik Omi | |
| 1973 | Yauwan | | | |
| | | | Total sales | 15,000,000 |

== Awards and nominations ==
Awards

- Filmfare Award for Best Music Director – 1997 (for Dil To Pagal Hai)
- Zee Cine Award for Best Music Director – 1998 (for Dil To Pagal Hai)

Nominations

- Zee Cine Award for Best Background Score – 1998 (for Dil To Pagal Hai)
- Screen Award for Best Music Director – 1998 (for Dil To Pagal Hai)
- Filmfare Award for Best Music Director – 2002 (for Gadar: Ek Prem Katha)
- IIFA Award for Best Music Director – 2002 (for Gadar: Ek Prem Katha)
- Screen Award for Best Music Director – 2002 (for Gadar: Ek Prem Katha)
- Screen Award for Best Background Music – 2003 (for Pinjar)
- Zee Cine Award Best Background Music – 2003 (for Pinjar)
- Apsara Award for Best Music Director – 2003 (for Pinjar)
