= Monty Sharma =

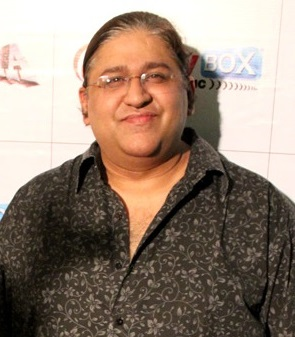
- Born: 17 April 1970 (age 56); Mumbai, Maharashtra, India
- Occupation: Music director
- Years active: 2002–present
- Musical career

Monty Sharma (born 17 April 1970) is a music composer from India scoring music for Bollywood. He is popular for being the background music composer for Black (2005), Ram-Leela (2013) and music director for Saawariya (2007). He is cousin of composer Mithoon and nephew of music composer Pyarelal Sharma of music composer duo Laxmikant–Pyarelal.

== Early life ==
Monty Sharma was born on 17 April 1970 in Mumbai. He started learning music at the age of five and had the opportunity to learn under the guidance of his grand father Pandit Ram Prasad Sharma. Monty is nephew of Pyarelal Ramprasad Sharma of Laxmikant-Pyarelal fame. Monty started his career as a professional keyboard player with Laxmikant-Pyarelal for the film Mr. India at the age of sixteen. He worked with all the well known music directors such as Laxmikant Pyeralal, R.D. Burman, Rajesh Roshan, Nadeem Shravan, Jatin–Lalit, Ismail Darbar, Sanjeev Darshan for many bollywood films.

He was a member of judges' panel of the popular reality show STAR Voice of India 2.

== Career ==
=== Background music composer ===
- 2002 - Maa Tujhhe Salaam
- 2002 - Devdas
- 2005 - Black
- 2005 - Lucky: No Time for Love
- 2007 - Apne
- 2007 - Saawariya
- 2008 - U Me Aur Hum
- 2010 - Veer
- 2013 - Ram-Leela
- 2014 - Spark
- 2015 - Hawaizaada
- 2016 - Shaukeen Kaminay
- 2016 - Ek Tha Hero
- 2016 - Pratichhaya
- 2016 - Final Cut of Director
- 2017 - JD
- 2017 - Blue Mountains
- 2018 - Genius
- 2023 - Gadar 2
- 2024 - Main Atal Hoon

=== Music director ===
- 2005 - Black
- 2007 - Saawariya
- 2008 - Right Yaaa Wrong
- 2008 - Fox
- 2008 - Naughty @ 40
- 2008 - Chamku
- 2008 - Heroes
- 2009 - Vaada Raha
- 2010 - Mirch
- 2012 - Run Bhola Run
- 2013 - Spark
- 2017 - Shrestha Bangali
- 2023 - Gadar 2 - 6 songs: "Tuk Tuk Tenu", "Bata De Sakhi", "Rabb Jeya Sohnaa", "Babul", "Wasl Ki", "Come Closer"

== Awards ==
Won

- 2006 - Filmfare Award for Best Background Score for the film Black
- 2006 - Screen Award for Best Background Music for the film Black
- 2006 - IIFA Award for Best Background Score for the film Black
- 2006 - Zee Cine Award for Best Background Music for the film Black
- 2008 - Filmfare RD Burman Award for New Music Talent for the film Saawariya

Nominated

- 2008 - Filmfare Award for Best Music Director for the film Saawariya
- 2008 - Set Max Stardust Award for Music for the film Saawariya
- 2014 - LifeOk Screen Awards for best background score for the film Goliyon Ki Raasleela Ram-leela
- 2014 - Filmfare award for best background score for the film Goliyon Ki Raasleela Ram-leela
