= Gadar: Ek Prem Katha =

2001 Indian film by Anil Sharma

- Theatrical release poster
- Directed by: Anil Sharma
- Written by: Shaktimaan Talwar
- Produced by: Nitin Keni
- Starring: Sunny Deol; Ameesha Patel; Amrish Puri; Vivek Shauq; Lillete Dubey; Utkarsh Sharma
- Narrated by: Om Puri
- Cinematography: Najeeb Khan
- Edited by: Keshav Naidu; Arun V. Narvekar; A. D. Dhanashekharan
- Music by: Uttam Singh
- Production company: Zee Telefilms
- Distributed by: Zee Telefilms
- Release date: 15 June 2001
- Running time: 184 minutes (Original version); 192 minutes (Remastered version)
- Country: India
- Language: Hindi
- Budget: ₹18.5 crore
- Box office: ₹133 crore

Gadar: Ek Prem Katha (transl. Rebellion: A Love Story) is a 2001 Indian Hindi-language epic period action drama film directed by Anil Sharma, based on a story by Shaktimaan Talwar. Set against the backdrop of the Partition of India in 1947, the film stars Sunny Deol and Ameesha Patel in lead roles, Amrish Puri, Vivek Shauq, Lillete Dubey and Utkarsh Sharma in supporting roles. Loosely inspired by the real-life story of Boota Singh, the narrative follows Tara Singh, a Sikh trucker, who falls in love with and marries Sakina, a Muslim woman, only to face separation and political upheaval as she is taken back to Pakistan by her family.

The film was produced on a budget of approximately ₹190 million (US$4.03 million) and was released theatrically on 15 June 2001, alongside Ashutosh Gowariker’s Lagaan. Principal photography took place in various locations across North India, with cinematography by Najeeb Khan and production design by Nitin Desai. The music was composed by Uttam Singh, with lyrics by Anand Bakshi. The soundtrack became one of the most successful albums of the year.

Upon release, Gadar: Ek Prem Katha received positive reviews. Critics praised its dramatic intensity, action sequences, and performances—particularly those of Deol, Patel, and Puri—though some noted its melodramatic tone. The film emerged as a major commercial success, grossing over ₹1.33 billion (US$28.19 million) worldwide and emerging as the highest-grossing Hindi film of its time, surpassing the record held by Hum Aapke Hain Koun..! (1994). It recorded over 50 million footfalls in India, making it the second most-watched Indian film since the 1980s after Baahubali 2: The Conclusion (2017). According to Box Office India, its adjusted domestic gross as of 2017 stood at ₹4.86 billion (US$103 million).

At the 47th Filmfare Awards, the film received nine nominations, including Best Film, Best Director (Sharma), Best Actor (Deol), Best Actress (Patel), and Best Music Director (Singh), with Patel receiving the Filmfare Special Performance Award. Over time, the film has attained cult status for its patriotic themes and larger-than-life storytelling.

A sequel, Gadar 2, was released theatrically on 11 August 2023, with Deol, Patel, and Sharma reprising their roles. The sequel was also a commercial blockbuster.

== Plot ==
During the 1947 Partition of India, communal violence erupted as people migrated between the newly formed nations of India and Pakistan. Amidst the chaos, Tara Singh, a Sikh trucker, initially joins Hindu and Sikh mobs together attacking Muslim refugees. He notices Sakina Ali, whom he recognises from her college and school days in Shimla, while attacking Ashraf Ali and his family, and leaves them to their fate. However, later that night, Sakina wakes up hiding from some sacks, while Tara checks the station along with other people. A guy from the Hindu and Sikh mobs notices Sakina's necklace, thus chasing her with the remaining crowd. Tara encounters Sakina, who obliges him, and protects her from them. To shield her identity, he smears blood on her forehead, symbolically claiming her as his Sikh wife.

The narrative flashes back to pre-Partition Lahore in 1945, where Tara delivers supplies to a college attended by Sakina. Although initially mocked by Sakina’s friends for his working-class background, Tara wins them over with his singing talent. Sakina is moved by his sincerity and advocates for him to perform at a college function. A bond develops between the two, and as a parting gesture on her graduation, Tara gifts Sakina a miniature Taj Mahal.

Back to the present, they arrive at the home where Tara is residing. Sakina notices the blood on her head and gets worried, but Tara consoles her that he had to do so to save her from the crowd. In the morning, when Sakina almost hears her family's calls in her sleep, the crowd returns to find Sakina; Tara stops them and tries to control them, but the adamant crowd won't pay heed to his attempts. Meanwhile, Sakina wakes up, only to discover from the crowd that her family has perished, including her disabled brother, thus shattering her. Tara stops the crowd from entering Sakina's room and fights with them, thus ousting the crowd. They move to the station, and Sakina sees her family's belongings smeared with blood, thus believing in her family's demise, leading her to kill herself, but Tara saves her. Sakina also asks Tara why he saved her when he was even attacking the Muslim individuals, and should've left her for dead.

Tara reveals to Sakina his tragic past; following the Partition, Tara's family attempts to migrate to India, but is killed in a retaliatory attack by a Muslim mob. Devastated, Tara joins violent reprisals against Muslims.

Returning to the present timeline, he shelters Sakina, who also checks Tara's diary, where she finds her photo and a rose she had given to him. Tara takes the entire care of Sakina, even trying to make her laugh at one point. Tara's relatives face scrutiny; his aunt checks and verifies it by noticing her, but after learning that she's orphaned, she resonates with her but also suggests that he take her to the refugee camp. Learning his aunt's suggestions, Sakina decides to leave for the camp to avoid burdening Tara. However, realising her feelings for him, she returns. Tara's uncle initially refuses the alliance, but later accepts Sakina as their daughter-in-law, and the two marry, live a happy life, and have a son named Charanjeet (fondly called "Jeete").

Seven years later, in 1954, while celebrating Holi, Sakina learns her family is alive and residing in Lahore through a piece of newspaper, where her father, Ashraf Ali, now serves as mayor, and they had only lost their son because of the Hindu and Sikh mobs. Due to visa restrictions, she travels alone to reunite with them, promising to return. However, her family opposes the marriage and plans to wed her to Salim, a Pakistani army officer and the son of his accomplice, Sarfaraz. Sakina resists, expressing her wish to return to India and her son.

Determined to bring her back, Tara crosses the border illegally with Jeete and his friend Darmiyaan. After reaching his long-lost friend's house, the trio learn that Sakina is getting married to Salim in Islampura. They locate Sakina and disrupt her forced marriage, with Tara beating Ashraf Ali's guards as well as Salim and Sakina's uncle, Usman, and arguing with Ashraf Ali, who takes out a sword to kill him, but is stopped by their Qazi. The Qazi advises Ashraf Ali not to engage in a fight against him and to use trickery. To avoid public backlash, Ashraf Ali agrees to their reunion on the condition that Tara converts to Islam and settles in Pakistan. Later that night, during a public gathering, Tara accepts the terms but refuses to denounce India, leading to a violent confrontation.

The family escapes and takes refuge in a cottage near the border. When their location is betrayed, Ashraf Ali and his men pursue them. Tara, Sakina, Charanjeet, and Darmiyaan board a train to India, but are intercepted, allowing Tara to take down most of the armed forces and run the train faster. In the clash, Sakina is accidentally shot by her father, leading Tara into confronting Ashraf Ali, but cancelling the brawl and calls for a doctor. The doctor says that Sakina had fallen into a coma, despite having operated on her. Jeete sings their familial song to try to wake her up, and Sakina suddenly wakes up after a nightmare, thus recovering from the coma. Upon recovering, she reunites with Tara and Charanjeet. Witnessing their love and devotion, Ashraf Ali has a change of heart and accepts Tara as his son-in-law. The family returns to India, reunited.

== Cast ==
- Sunny Deol as Tara Singh
- Ameesha Patel as Sakeena Ali Singh, Tara’s girlfriend, later wife
- Amrish Puri as Ashraf Ali, Sakeena's father
- Lillete Dubey as Shabana Ali, Sakeena's mother
- Vivek Shauq as Darmiyaan Singh, Tara's best friend
- Utkarsh Sharma as Charanjeet "Jeete" Singh, Tara and Sakeena's son
- Suresh Oberoi as Kulwant Singh, Tara's uncle (Taya)
- Madhu Malti as Gurjeet Singh, Tara's aunt (Tayee)
- Pramod Moutho as Gurdeep Singh, Tara's father
- Kanika Shivpuri as Parmeet Kaur, Tara's mother
- Preeti Bhutani as Tara Singh's sister #1
- Mushtaq Khan as Gul Khan
- Dolly Bindra as Samira Khan
- Madhumalti Kapoor as Tara's aunt
- Arjun Dwivedi as Pakistani jailor
- Ahsaan Khan as Abdul Ali
- Tony Mirchandani as Sarfaraz Ali
- Samar Jai Singh as Salim Ali
- Gyan Prakash as Wali Mohammed
- Vikrant Chaturvedi as Karim
- Rakesh Bedi as Vaid Kimtilal
- Vishwajeet Pradhan as Daroga Suleiman
- Ishrat Ali as Qazi of the Ali family
- Mithilesh Chaturvedi as Idris, Editor of Jung daily newspaper
- B.N. Sharma as Iqbal, Officer of the Pakistan Consulate in Delhi
- Pratima Kazmi as a greedy Woman
- Amita Khopkar as Bano
- Santosh Gupta as Chanta
- Abhay Bhargava as an Indian Army Officer
- Shweta Shinde as Sakina's friend, girls' boarding Hostel
- Om Puri as the narrator
- Malavika Shivpuri as Tara Singh's sister #2
- Gulshan Mazdiasni as the Opera singer at the Annual Function

== Production ==
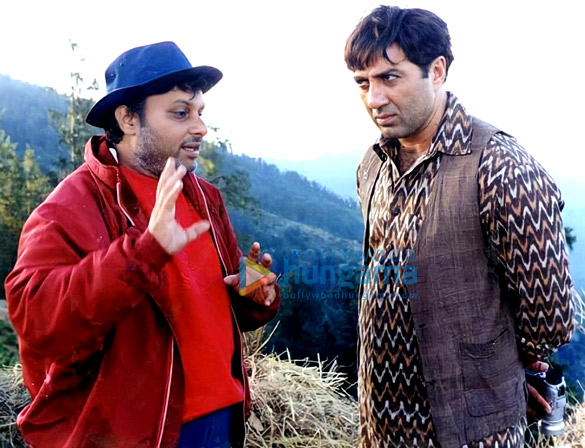
Anil Sharma and Sunny Deol on the sets of Gadar.

=== Casting ===
Kajol was initially offered the role of Sakina but declined the offer, stating that the film did not align with her preferences. Aishwarya Rai was also considered. The role was eventually played by Ameesha Patel, who was then a newcomer. Patel underwent a 12-hour audition, and was selected from over 500 other candidates. Gadar: Ek Prem Katha was scheduled to be her debut film, but Kaho Naa...Pyaar Hai (2000), which also featured her, was released first.

=== Filming ===
Principal photography took place across various locations in India. Several sequences were shot in Shimla, including at Bishop Cotton School and other sites around the city. Additional scenes were filmed at Sacred Heart Senior Secondary School in Dalhousie. Although the film is set in 1947, it notably features a rendition of the song "Que Sera Sera," which was originally published in 1956.

The production also filmed extensively in Uttar Pradesh. Parts of Lucknow and Rudauli were used to represent Lahore, Pakistan, with key scenes shot at La Martinière College and Irshad Manzil Palace. To capture the atmosphere of a partition-torn India, scenes were also filmed in Pathankot, Sarna, and Amritsar, emphasizing the physical and emotional divide created during the Partition.

== Music ==
The music of Gadar: Ek Prem Katha was composed by Uttam Singh, with lyrics penned by Anand Bakshi. The film’s soundtrack features playback vocals primarily by Udit Narayan and Alka Yagnik, who lent their voices to the characters portrayed by Sunny Deol and Ameesha Patel, respectively.

According to Box Office India, the soundtrack sold approximately 2.5 million copies, making it one of the best-selling Bollywood albums of 2001.

== Reception ==
=== Box office ===
Upon its release on 15 June 2001, Gadar: Ek Prem Katha emerged as a major commercial success and was declared an All-Time Blockbuster by Box Office India. The film grossed ₹1.33 billion (US$16 million) during its initial theatrical run in 2001 and recorded footfalls exceeding 50 million in India. As of 2017, its adjusted gross based on ticket sales was estimated at ₹4.86 billion (US$57 million), making it one of the most-watched Indian films of all time.

The film sustained a long theatrical run, collecting ₹40.2 million (₹4.02 crore) in its eighth week alone.[6] In the United Kingdom, the film grossed approximately £280,000 during its overseas run.

=== Critical reception ===
Upon its release on 15 June 2001, Gadar: Ek Prem Katha received generally positive reviews from critics. Ruchi Sharma of Rediff.com described the film as "coming close to being fantastic," while noting that certain portions felt "overheated." Taran Adarsh of IndiaFM (now Bollywood Hungama) gave the film 3 out of 5 stars, commending its "brilliant dramatic and confrontation sequences, splendid performances, and touching moments," though he criticized the runtime and music. DNA India later included the film in its list of "must-watch Bollywood films" depicting the Partition of India.

== Accolades ==
Award	Date of the ceremony	Category	Recipients	Result	Ref.
Zee Cine Awards	11 January 2002	Best Director	Anil Sharma	Nominated	
Zee Cine Awards	11 January 2002	Best Actor – Male	Sunny Deol	Nominated	
Zee Cine Awards	11 January 2002	Best Actor – Female	Ameesha Patel	Nominated	
Zee Cine Awards	11 January 2002	Best Performance in a Negative Role	Amrish Puri	Nominated	
Zee Cine Awards	11 January 2002	Outstanding Performance – Male	Sunny Deol	Won	
Zee Cine Awards	11 January 2002	Best Lyricist	Anand Bakshi (for "Udja Kale Kawan")	Nominated	
Zee Cine Awards	11 January 2002	Best Story	Shaktimaan Talwar	Nominated	
Screen Awards	13 January 2002	Best Film	Gadar: Ek Prem Katha	Nominated	
Screen Awards	13 January 2002	Best Director	Anil Sharma	Nominated	
Screen Awards	13 January 2002	Best Actor	Sunny Deol	Won	
Screen Awards	13 January 2002	Best Actress	Ameesha Patel	Nominated	
Screen Awards	13 January 2002	Best Music Director	Uttam Singh	Nominated	
Screen Awards	13 January 2002	Best Lyricist	Anand Bakshi (for "Musafir Jaane Wale")	Nominated	
Screen Awards	13 January 2002	Best Male Playback Singer	Udit Narayan (for "Udja Kale Kawan")	Nominated	
Screen Awards	13 January 2002	Jodi No. 1	Sunny Deol and Ameesha Patel	Nominated	
Screen Awards	13 January 2002	Best Screenplay	Shaktimaan Talwar	Nominated	
Screen Awards	13 January 2002	Best Dialogue	Shaktimaan Talwar	Nominated	
Screen Awards	13 January 2002	Best Art Direction	Sanjay Dhabade	Nominated	
Screen Awards	13 January 2002	Best Action	Tinu Verma	Won	
Filmfare Awards	16 February 2002	Best Film	Gadar: Ek Prem Katha	Nominated	
Filmfare Awards	16 February 2002	Best Director	Anil Sharma	Nominated	
Filmfare Awards	16 February 2002	Best Actor	Sunny Deol	Nominated	
Filmfare Awards	16 February 2002	Best Actress	Ameesha Patel	Nominated	
Filmfare Awards	16 February 2002	Special Performance Award	Ameesha Patel	Won	
Filmfare Awards	16 February 2002	Best Performance in a Negative Role	Amrish Puri	Nominated	
Filmfare Awards	16 February 2002	Best Music Director	Uttam Singh	Nominated	
Filmfare Awards	16 February 2002	Best Lyricist	Anand Bakshi (for "Udja Kale Kawan")	Nominated	
Filmfare Awards	16 February 2002	Best Male Playback Singer	Udit Narayan (for "Udja Kale Kawan")	Nominated	
Filmfare Awards	16 February 2002	Best Action	Tinu Verma	Won	
Sansui Viewers' Choice Movie Awards	27 March 2002	Best Actor	Sunny Deol	Won	
Sansui Viewers' Choice Movie Awards	27 March 2002	Best Actress	Ameesha Patel	Nominated	
Sansui Viewers' Choice Movie Awards	27 March 2002	Best Actress (Critics)	Ameesha Patel	Won	
Bollywood Movie Awards	6 April 2002	Best Actor	Sunny Deol	Nominated	
Bollywood Movie Awards	6 April 2002	Best Actress (Critics)	Ameesha Patel	Nominated	
Bollywood Movie Awards	6 April 2002	Best Villain	Amrish Puri	Nominated	
IIFA Awards	6 April 2002	Best Film	Gadar: Ek Prem Katha	Nominated	
IIFA Awards	6 April 2002	Best Director	Anil Sharma	Nominated	
IIFA Awards	6 April 2002	Best Actor	Sunny Deol	Nominated	
IIFA Awards	6 April 2002	Best Actress	Ameesha Patel	Nominated	
IIFA Awards	6 April 2002	Best Performance in a Comic Role	Vivek Shauq	Nominated	
IIFA Awards	6 April 2002	Best Performance in a Negative Role	Amrish Puri	Nominated	
IIFA Awards	6 April 2002	Best Music Director	Uttam Singh	Nominated	
IIFA Awards	6 April 2002	Best Lyricist	Anand Bakshi (for "Udja Kale Kawan")	Nominated	
IIFA Awards	6 April 2002	Best Male Playback	Udit Narayan (for "Udja Kale Kawan")	Nominated	
IIFA Awards	6 April 2002	Best Story	Shaktimaan Talwar	Nominated	
IIFA Awards	6 April 2002	Best Dialogue	Shaktimaan Talwar	Won	
IIFA Awards	6 April 2002	Best Action	Tinu Verma	Won	

== Controversy ==
The film faced protests, including incidents of arson and violence, at the time of its release particularly in Mumbai, Ahmedabad and Bhopal by some Muslim groups who were opposed to the depiction of an interfaith marriage between a Sikh man and Muslim woman as shown in the film. The film’s portrayal of partition violence was also alleged to be biased against Muslims. Chief Minister of Maharashtra Vilasrao Deshmukh was also petitioned by one of the groups to implement a ban in the state, though it did not materialize.

The film had also run into controversy an year earlier while filming at the Bara Imambara (a place for religious congregation) in Lucknow which was protested to by Shia Muslims, and the film had to be reshot at the nearby Rumi Gate.

Arif Masood, a local politician, was the leader of one of the protesting mobs in Bhopal which seriously injured a police constable. Reacting to the violence Deol said "What is sad about the protests is that they were started by cowards, but it is innocent people who are being hurt." Actress Shabana Azmi defended the film's right of exhibition stating, "The movie reinforces the canard that every Muslim is a Pakistani. It mixes issues of identity and nationalism, which should be handled sensitively. But it has been cleared by the Censor Board and has every right to be screened." Then Shiv Sena chief, Bal Thackeray, writing in Saamana too found 'nothing objectionable' in the film.

== Sequel ==
A sequel titled Gadar 2 was officially announced on 15 October 2021 with the release of a motion poster featuring Sunny Deol, Ameesha Patel, and Utkarsh Sharma reprising their roles. Directed by Anil Sharma and produced by Zee Studios, the film was released theatrically on 11 August 2023.

== Re-release ==
To commemorate the legacy of the film ahead of its sequel, an uncut and digitally remastered version of Gadar: Ek Prem Katha—featuring 4K resolution and Dolby Atmos sound—was given a limited theatrical re-release by Zee Studios on 9 June 2023.

== See also ==
- List of highest-grossing Bollywood films
- Shaheed-e-Mohabbat Boota Singh, 1999 Indian Punjabi-language film

== Bibliography ==
- Banaji, S. (23 May 2006). "Politics and Spectatorship 1: Viewing Love, Religion and Violence". Reading 'Bollywood': The Young Audience and Hindi Films. Palgrave Macmillan UK. pp. 147–52. ISBN 978-0-230-50120-1.
- Dwyer, Rachel (15 June 2014). Bollywood's India: Hindi Cinema as a Guide to Contemporary India. Reaktion Books. p. 50. ISBN 978-1-78023-304-8.
- Bhattacharya, Nandini (7 May 2013). Hindi Cinema: Repeating the Subject. Routledge. p. 169. ISBN 978-1-136-18986-9.
- Sinha, Babli (25 February 2014). South Asian Transnationalisms: Cultural Exchange in the Twentieth Century. Routledge. p. 135. ISBN 978-1-135-71832-9.
- Cunningham, Douglas A.; Nelson, John C. (28 March 2016). A Companion to the War Film. John Wiley & Sons. p. 310. ISBN 978-1-118-33761-5.
- Bharat, Meenakshi; Kumar, Nirmal (27 April 2012). Filming the Line of Control: The Indo–Pak Relationship Through the Cinematic Lens. Routledge. p. 161. ISBN 978-1-136-51606-1.
- Dwyer, Rachel (1 December 2005). 100 Bollywood Films. Roli Books Pvt. Ltd. p. 74. ISBN 978-81-7436-990-1.
- Mehta, Rini Bhattacharya; Mookerjea-Leonard, Debali (17 December 2014). The Indian Partition in Literature and Films: History, Politics, and Aesthetics. Routledge. p. 4. ISBN 978-1-317-66994-4.
- Dadhe, Kasturi (2009). "Religious and Nationalist Trends in Modern Bollywood Cinema". Zeitschrift für Anglistik und Amerikanistik. 57 (1). doi:10.1515/zaa.2009.57.1.9. ISSN 2196-4726. S2CID 164058417.
- Sharma, Manoj (2010). "Portrayal of Partition in Hindi Cinema". Proceedings of the Indian History Congress. 70: 1155–60. JSTOR 44147759.
- Bose, Nandana (Spring 2009). "The Hindu right and the politics of censorship: three case studies of policing Hindi Cinema, 1992-2002". Velvet Light Trap. 63 (63): 22. doi:10.1353/vlt.0.0029. S2CID 152796337 – via General OneFile.
