= Anil Sharma (director) =

Indian filmmaker

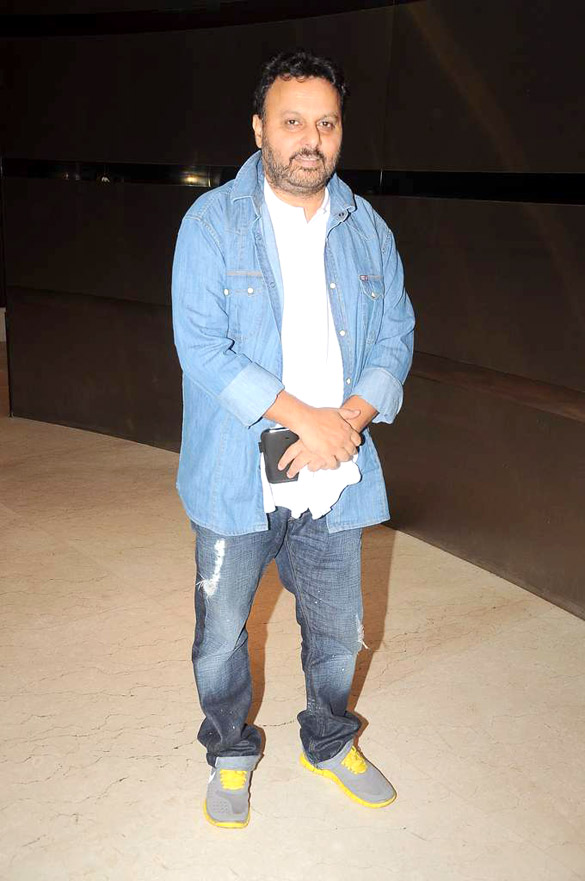
- Sharma in 2019
- Born: Mathura, Uttar Pradesh, India
- Occupations: Film director; Film producer
- Years active: 1980–present
- Organization: Anil Sharma Productions
- Known for: Hukumat (1987); Tahalka (1992); Gadar: Ek Prem Katha (2001); The Hero: Love Story of a Spy (2003); Apne (2007); Gadar 2 (2023)
- Spouse: Suman Sharma (m. 1992)
- Children: Utkarsh Sharma (son)

Anil Sharma is an Indian film director and producer. He is known for films like Gadar: Ek Prem Katha (2001), The Hero: Love Story of a Spy (2003), and Gadar 2 (2023).

== Biography ==
Sharma was born and brought up in Mathura, Uttar Pradesh, India. He belongs to a Punjabi Hindu family. His grandfather, Pt. Dalchand, was an astrologer. He later moved to Mumbai and did his B.Sc. at Khalsa College.

He got his first break in the Hindi film industry at the age of 18 as an assistant director. He assisted Baldev Raj Chopra on Pati Patni Aur Woh (1978), The Burning Train (1980), and Insaf Ka Tarazu (1980).

In 1980, at the age of 21, he debuted as a director with Shradhanjali, starring Raakhee. In 1983, he directed Bandhan Kuchchey Dhaagon Ka, and followed it up with Hukumat (1987) and Tahalka (1992). After the success of Tahalka, Sharma took a break from filmmaking for a few years and dedicated himself to open a studio in Mumbai on the lines of Universal Studios in Los Angeles. However, it did not materialize and Sharma returned to filmmaking with Maharaja.

In 2001, Sharma directed Gadar: Ek Prem Katha, starring Sunny Deol and Ameesha Patel. It was a huge commercial success and went on to become one of the biggest blockbusters in the history of Hindi cinema and the most successful film of the 2000s. He subsequently directed The Hero: Love Story of a Spy (2003), starring Sunny Deol and Preity Zinta. At that point, It was considered to be the most expensive film ever made in Hindi at that time and went on to become the third highest grosser of the year.

Ab Tumhare Hawale Watan Saathiyo was his next directorial. It is remembered for its patriotic fervor. Apne(2007), his next film, was critically praised for its depiction of family emotions and values. It garnered Anil critical and box office success, and was the first film starring all three Deols- Dharmendra, Sunny Deol and Bobby Deol.

In 2010, his next Veer, starring Salman Khan, Mithun Chakraborty, Jackie Shroff and Zarine Khan. The movie was much talked-about for its massive scale and depiction of the Indian Rajputana's war with the British. After this, he made Singh Saab The Great with Sunny Deol and Prakash Raj. In Genius (2018), he introduced his son Utkarsh Sharma as the lead, though he had already introduced him as a child artist in Gadar. For the first time in his career he shot in his hometown, Mathura. Upon release, it received overwhelmingly negative reviews from both the critics and audience, alike. It became a huge disaster at the box-office.

Five years later in 2023, he made a huge career comeback with Gadar 2, the sequel to Gadar: Ek Prem Katha. He reunited with Sunny Deol, Ameesha Patel, and Utkarsh Sharma. Though it received mixed reviews, it had a tremendous opening weekend and became the sixth highest-grossing Hindi film of all-time.

== Filmography ==
Key
†	Denotes films that have not yet been released

Year	Film	Credited as			Notes
Year	Film	Director	Producer	Writer	Notes
1981	Shradhanjali	Yes	Yes	Yes	
1983	Bandhan Kuchchey Dhaagon Ka	Yes	Yes	Yes	
1987	Hukumat	Yes	Yes	Yes	
1989	Elaan-E-Jung	Yes	Yes	Yes	
1991	Farishtay	Yes		Yes	
1992	Tahalka	Yes	Yes	Yes	
1992	Maa		Yes		
1994	Suhaag		Yes		
1995	Policewala Gunda		Yes		
1998	Maharaja	Yes			
2001	Gadar: Ek Prem Katha	Yes			
2003	The Hero: Love Story of a Spy	Yes			
2004	Ab Tumhare Hawale Watan Saathiyo	Yes	Yes		
2007	Apne	Yes			
2010	Veer	Yes			
2013	Singh Saab the Great	Yes	Yes		
2018	Genius	Yes	Yes	Yes	
2023	Gadar 2	Yes			
2024	Vanvaas	Yes	Yes	Yes	
