= Deepak Antani =

Indian actor and director known for portraying Mahatma Gandhi

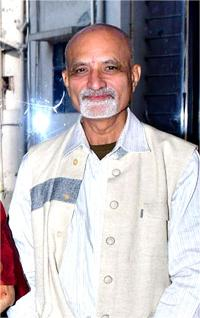
- Deepak Antani at the screening of Gandhi Godse - Ek Yudh
- Born: 20 September 1964 (age 61); Bhuj, Gujarat, India
- Occupations: Actor, film director, screenwriter
- Years active: 1988–present
- Known for: Portraying Mahatma Gandhi
- Notable work: Gandhi Godse – Ek Yudh; Mujib: The Making of a Nation

Deepak Antani (born on 20 September 1964) is an Indian actor, director and screenwriter known for his work in Gujarati and Hindi cinema, television and theatre. He is widely recognized for portraying Mahatma Gandhi across multiple platforms including films, plays, documentaries and museum. His performance as Gandhi in Gandhi Godse – Ek Yudh (2023), directed by Rajkumar Santoshi, received national attention. He has also played the role in the international film Gandhiji My Mentor (2016) and stage play M.K. Gandhi Hazir Ho (2019), which has been performed across India. Antani holds records in both the Limca Book of Records (2020–22) and India Book of Records (2019) for the maximum number of performances as Mahatma Gandhi on stage and screen.

== Early life and education ==
Deepak Antani was born in Bhuj, in the Kutch district of Gujarat, India. He completed a Diploma in Electrical engineering with distinction. Later, he pursued his passion for performing arts and earned a Bachelor of Performing Arts in Dramatics from Maharaja Sayajirao University of Baroda. Before becoming a full-time actor, he worked as an electrical technician at Indian Petrochemicals Corporation Limited. (IPCL) and as a production assistant at Doordarshan, India's national broadcaster.

== Career ==
Deepak Antani began his career as a production assistant at Doordarshan, Ahmedabad, and later served as the Programming Head at ETV (now Colors Gujarati). He also worked as a consultant for various regional Gujarati TV channels, including GSTV and Soham TV.

He made his directorial debut in Gujarati cinema with Bhav Bhav Na Bharthar in 2000, which won regional film awards. Over the years, he has acted in more than 25 Gujarati and Hindi films and over 30 television serials. He has also written, directed, and performed in many stage plays, short films, and documentaries focusing on Indian history and social themes.

Antani is best known for his long-standing portrayal of Mahatma Gandhi. He played Gandhi in Gandhiji My Mentor (2016), which was screened at several international film festivals and later released on ZEE5 and YouTube. In 2023, he portrayed Gandhi in Gandhi Godse - Ek Yudh (2023), directed by Rajkumar Santoshi, and Mujib: The Making of a Nation (2023), directed by Shyam Benegal. He also played the same role in Kesari Chapter 2 (2025), which was released in 2025 and produced by Dharma Productions.

On stage, Antani has performed as Gandhi in more than 190 shows. His notable theatrical works include Yugpurush (2016), which depicted Gandhi's spiritual journey, and M. K. Gandhi Hazir Ho (since 2019), a solo play that he also wrote and directed. Yugpurush became part of a record-breaking theatrical run with over 1000 performances in India and abroad.

His image and voice as Gandhi have been featured in several museum exhibits and digital projects. These include Walk with Gandhiji at Rashtrapati Bhavan Museum in New Delhi, Talk with Bapu at Mahatma Gandhi Museum, Rajkot, and an exhibit at the Gandhi Tower in Patna. He has also appeared in government-supported documentaries such as Jang-e-Azadi, Vishwa Manav Mahatma Gandhi and Gandhiji Amdavad Ma.

Antani recently directed the Gujarati feature film Goti Lo (2025), continuing his contribution to socially relevant narratives in regional Indian cinema.

== Filmography ==
Year	Title	Role	Actor	Writer	Director	Language	Notes	Refs
2000	Bhav Bhav Na Bharthar			Yes	Yes	Gujarati	Streaming on Hotstar	
2016	Kanku Purayu Maa Amba Na Chok Ma				Yes	Gujarati	Revised Title is Dil Ma Vasto Desh, Streaming on Shemaroo Gujarati	
2016	Gandhiji My Mentor	Gandhiji	Yes			Hindi		
2017	Pritam Apni Paheli Prit				Yes	Gujarati		
2019	Daddy I Love You			Yes		Gujarati		
2019	Pagal Kar Diya Toone	Dhanraj Sheth	Yes			Hindi		
2021	Love You Pappu	Gandhiji	Yes			Hindi		
2022	Thank You Boss			Yes	Yes	Gujarati	Streaming on Shemaroo Gujarati	
2022	Maare Shu	News Debater	Yes			Gujarati		
2023	Lakiro	Judge	Yes			Gujarati		
2023	Gandhi Godse – Ek Yudh	Mohandas Karamchand Gandhi	Yes			Hindi	Directed by Rajkumar Santoshi	
2023	Mujib: The Making of a Nation	Mahatma Gandhi	Yes			Hindi	Indo-Bangla Film Directed by Shyam Benegal	
2025	Kesari Chapter 2	Mahatma Gandhi	Yes			Hindi		
2025	Auntypreneur	Himanshu Bhai	Yes			Gujarati		
2025	Goti Lo				Yes	Gujarati	Also Executive producer and lyricist	

== Web series ==
Year	Title	Role	Language	Notes	Refs
2019	The Family Man	Gujarati Driver	Hindi	Season 1, Episode 7 Paradise, Streaming on Amazon Prime Video	
2022	Kalyanmurti Shrimadji Ni Jivangatha	Mahatma Gandhi	Gujarati	With co-actress Rohini Hattangadi, Streaming on 1 OTT YouTube Channel	

== Television ==
Year	Title	Role	Channel	Language	Notes	Refs
2019	Taarak Mehta Ka Ooltah Chashmah	Gandhiji	Sony SAB	Hindi	Episode 2832	
2020	Barrister Babu	Gandhiji	Colors TV	Hindi	Episode 136 and 137	
2024	Sardar: The Game Changer	Mahatma Gandhi	DD National	Hindi	As a young and old Gandhiji in Episodes 1 to 30	

== Theater Play ==
Year	Title	Role	Actor	Writer	Director	Language	Notes	Refs
2004	Sardar Patel	Gandhiji	Yes	Yes	Yes	Gujarati	Supported by Gujarat State Sangeet Natak Academy	
2015	Yugpurush	Gandhiji	Yes	No	No	Gujarati and Hindi	Produced by Shrimad Rajchandra Mission Dharampur	
2019	M.K. Gandhi Hazir Ho	M.K. Gandhi	Yes	Yes	Yes	Hindi	Performed for Global Art Festival and Sponsored by Gujarat Tourism	

== Social and Cultural Contributions ==
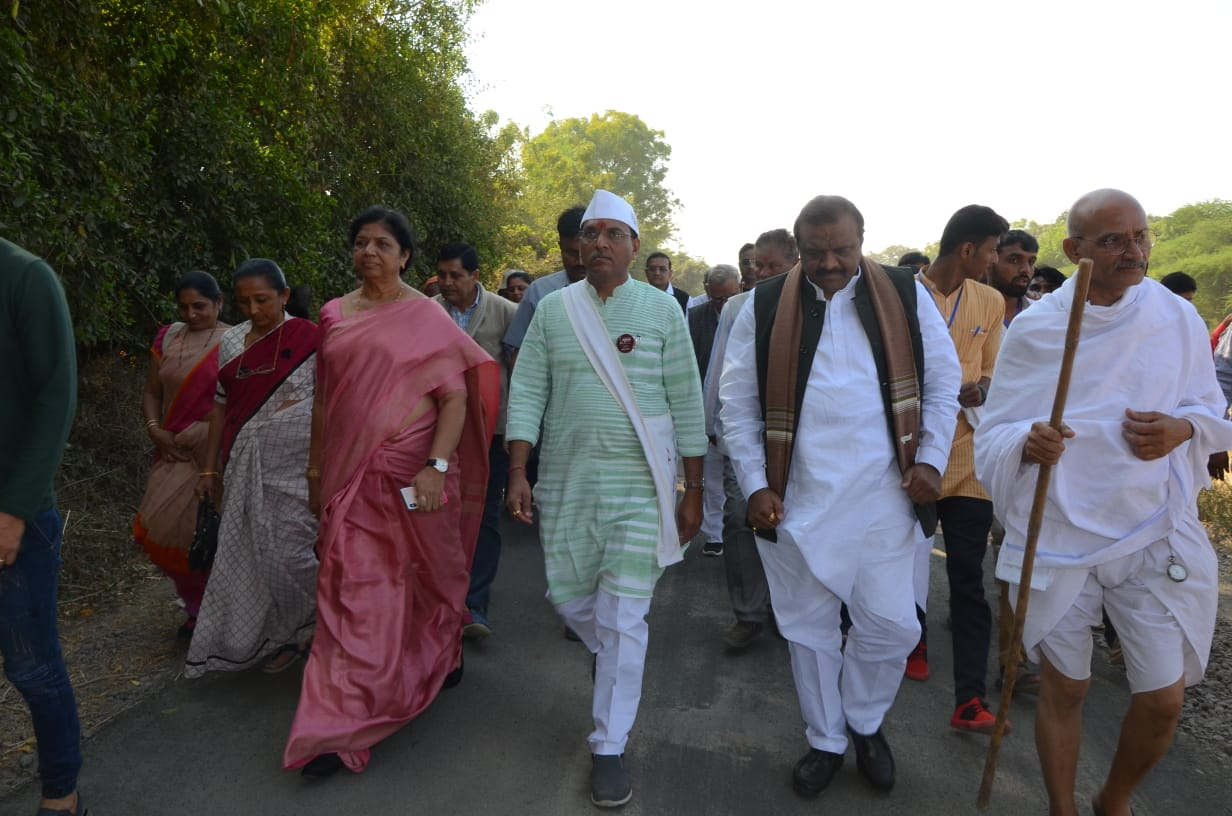
Deepak Antani with Mansukh Mandaviya during the Padyatra on the 150th birth anniversary of Mahatma Gandhi

In January 2019, Deepak Antani participated in a 150-kilometre Gandhi Padyatra across Gujarat, led by Union Minister Mansukh Mandaviya, along with Dileepbhai Sanghani and Parshottam Rupala. The padyatra aimed to promote basic education and Gandhian values. Antani, appearing as Mahatma Gandhi, delivered public speeches during the journey to engage communities on themes of truth, non-violence, and self-reliance.

== Awards and recognition ==
Deepak Antani was featured in the Limca Book of Records (2020–2022) and the India Book of Records (2019) for the most performances as Mahatma Gandhi. He won Best Actor for Gandhi Godse – Ek Yudh at the Maharaja Film Festival and received a special award at the Transmedia Gujarati Awards (2024) for his portrayal of Gandhi.

== See also ==
- List of artistic depictions of Mahatma Gandhi
- Gujarati theatre
- List of Gujarati films
- List of Indian film directors
