= Gandhi Godse – Ek Yudh =

2023 film by Rajkumar Santoshi

- Theatrical release poster
- Directed by: Rajkumar Santoshi
- Written by: Rajkumar Santoshi; Asghar Wajahat (Dialogues)
- Screenplay by: Rajkumar Santoshi
- Produced by: Manila Santoshi
- Starring: Deepak Antani; Chinmay Mandlekar; Tanisha Santoshi; Ghanshyam Srivastav; Anuj Saini
- Cinematography: Rishi Punjabi
- Edited by: A. Sreekar Prasad
- Music by: A. R. Rahman
- Production company: Santoshi Productions LLP
- Distributed by: PVR Pictures
- Release date: 26 January 2023 (India)
- Running time: 110 minutes
- Country: India
- Language: Hindi

Gandhi Godse – Ek Yudh (transl. Gandhi Godse – A War) is a 2023 Indian Hindi-language historical fiction film written and directed by Rajkumar Santoshi, and produced by Manila Santoshi. The film stars Deepak Antani and Chinmay Mandlekar in the lead roles. The film deals with a fictional situation in which Mahatma Gandhi survives his assassination and thereafter decides to not only pardon Nathuram Godse, but also socialize with him.

== Plot ==
The film depicts that Godse holds Gandhi responsible for the partition of India and misery of Hindus. He shoots Gandhi on 30 January 1948 but Gandhi is miraculously saved and pardons Godse. After breaking his ties with the Congress, Gandhi begins his Gram Swaraj Movement to inspire villages towards self-reliance. Meanwhile, the system highlights Godse's writing and manipulates public sentiment against Gandhi whose interference has created a ruckus within the government. This leads to Gandhi's arrest which he insists on serving with Godse. They have multiple debates and arguments, even confrontations in prison. Soon Gandhi and Godse start to understand each other. Gradually Gandhi brings a change over Godse. During a marriage officiated by Gandhi, another attacker tries to shoot and kill him; Godse saves his life and soon together they are released from jail.

== Cast ==
- Deepak Antani as Mohandas Karamchand Gandhi
- Chinmay Mandlekar as Nathuram Vinayak Godse
- Tanisha Santoshi as Sushma
- Anuj Saini as Naren
- Pawan Chopra as Jawaharlal Nehru
- Mukund Pathak as B. R. Ambedkar
- Ghanshyam Srivastav as Vallabhbhai Patel
- Sandeep Bhojak as Jailer Amod Rai
- Vipul Deshpande as DSP Rana

== Production ==
Santoshi confessed in pre-release promotions that it was hard to receive investment for such a large scale film with a potentially controversial subject. He added that it was only after composer A. R. Rahman accepted to do the film, investors started showing interest, and the film may not have been made if Rahman said 'no'.

Filming commenced on 20 September 2020 and was wrapped on 6 May 2022. Bhopal and Mumbai served as the principal locations.

== Music ==
Gandhi Godse Ek Yudh

Soundtrack album by A.R. Rahman
- Released: 26 January 2023 (Film)
- Recorded: 2021–2022
- Genre: Feature film soundtrack
- Language: Hindi
- Label: T-Series.

A.R. Rahman chronology
Ponniyin Selvan: I (2022)	Gandhi Godse Ek Yudh (2023)	Ponniyin Selvan : II (2023)

The music is composed by A. R. Rahman in his third collaboration with Rajkumar Santoshi after Pukar and The Legend of Bhagat Singh. The director-composer duo had not collaborated for over two decades, though Rahman was approached for Khakee and he did not sign it due to scheduling conflicts.

Track-List
No.	Title	Lyrics	Singer(s)	Length
1.	"Raghupati Raghav Raja Ram"	Late Lakshmanacharya	Various Artists	3:04
2.	"Vaishnav Jan To"	Narsinh Mehta	Shreya Ghoshal	5:54
Total length:				8:58

== Release ==
The film was released in India on 26 January 2023, coinciding with the Indian Republic Day.

== Reception ==
On the review aggregator website Rotten Tomatoes, 0% of 6 critics' reviews are positive, with an average rating of 3.3/10.

The film received generally negative reviews from critics, who praised its performances, visual style, music, and cinematography, but criticized its screenplay and story.

Due to the dispute over the context of the film, Santoshi sought police protection after allegedly receiving threats.
