= Jis Lahore Nai Vekhya, O Jamya E Nai =

1989 play by Asghar Wajahat

Jinne Lhor Nai Vekhya, O Jamya E Nai (transl. from Punjabi: Experiencing Lahore is so fundamental to a fulfilling life that not seeing it is akin to not truly living or being born) is a 1989 play by Professor Asghar Wajahat. It premiered at multiple locations - Lahore, Karachi, New York, Dubai and all over India - in 1989 and played thereafter all over the world.

== Synopsis ==
The play opens in Lahore in the West Punjab province of Pakistan, just after the 1947 Partition of India and the subsequent division of the Punjab province. Both India and the newly formed Pakistan are grappling with a massive refugee crisis, as displaced families seek new homes. Sikander Mirza and his Muslim family, forced to leave their beloved city of Lucknow in the United Provinces state of India, are allotted a beautiful haveli in Lahore that once belonged to a Punjabi Hindu family.

As Sikander, his wife, Hameeda, their son, Javed, and daughter, Tanvir, begin exploring their new home, they are shocked when an old woman emerges. She seems to have been abandoned by her family when they left for East Punjab in India. Only known as Mai (or mother), she claims to be the true owner of the haveli and accuses Sikander and his family of trespassing, refusing to leave. This central conflict is set against a backdrop of rising communalism, personified by Yaqoob Pehalwan, a self-proclaimed defender of Islam. When Pehalwan learns a Hindu woman is living in the haveli, he becomes enraged and tries to extort money from Sikander, threatening to harm her. In contrast, the character of a local Maulvi, Ikramuddin, represents the compassionate side of Islam, advocating for peace and respect.

Woven into this story is Nasir Kazmi, a refugee poet from Ambala in the East Punjab state of India, who wanders the city at night, pouring out his sorrow and nostalgia through his poetry. He often confronts Pehalwan at a local tea stall, symbolizing the struggle between humanity's wounded soul and the forces of hatred. Over time, the animosity between the Mirza family and the old woman transforms into a warm friendship. She becomes a part of their lives, maintaining her routines of daily holy baths in the Ravi river and helping neighbours with traditional remedies. The women of the haveli and neighbourhood enjoy her company, sharing stories and debating the merits of their respective hometowns.

However, Pehalwan's hatred remains. He is determined to get rid of the old Hindu woman even though the Maulvi persuades him to follow the teachings of Islam and respect her. In the end, the old woman passes away. In a powerful display of unity, the Maulvi suggests that her last rites be performed according to the Hindu tradition. Enraged, Pehalwan and his goons assassinate the Maulvi. Even with threats from Pehalwan and the sinister forces of communalism, Sikander, his family, and the kind people of Lahore unite to perform her last rites as per Hindu traditions. Sikander lights her funeral pyre on the banks of the Ravi River, a final tribute to their shared humanity.

== Film adaptation ==
=== Batwara 1947 ===
A film adaptation titled Batwara 1947 directed by Rajkumar Santoshi starring Sunny Deol, Preity Zinta, and Shabana Azmi will release on 13 August 2026.
