= Asghar Wajahat =

Indian Hindi scholar and writer

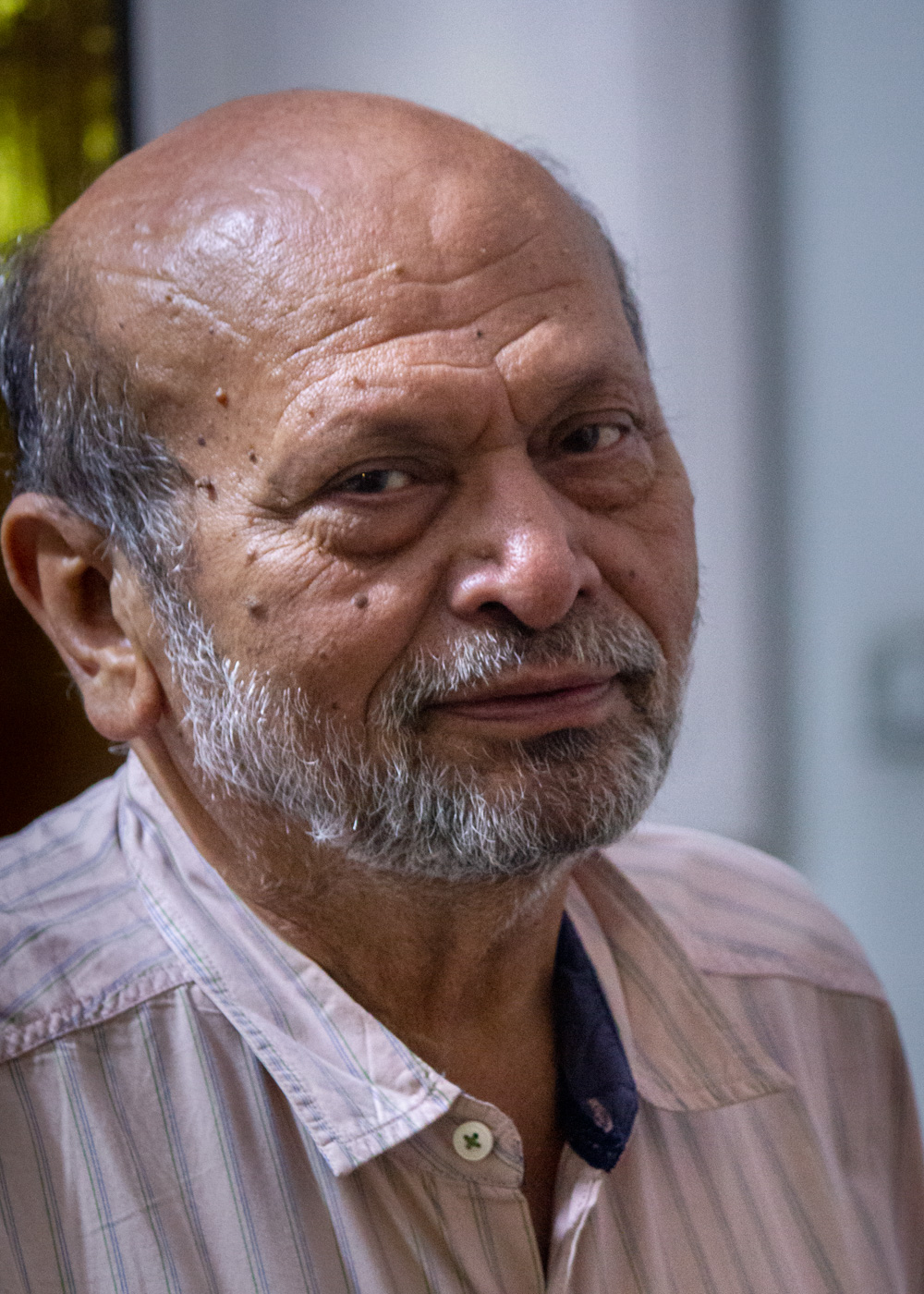
- Asghar Wajahat
- Born: Syed Asghar Wajahat; July 5, 1946; Fatehpur, Uttar Pradesh, India
- Education: Aligarh Muslim University
- Occupations: author, academic
- Writing career
- Language: Hindi
- Notable works: Jis Lahore Nai Vekhya, O Jamya E Nai; Saat Aasmaan

Syed Asghar Wajahat, known as Asghar Wajahat (born 5 July 1946), is a Hindi scholar, fiction writer, novelist, playwright, an independent documentary filmmaker and a television scriptwriter, who is most known for his novel Saat Aasmaan and his play, Jis Lahore Nai Vekhya, O Jamya E Nai, about an old Punjabi Hindu woman who gets left behind in Lahore, after the Partition of India, and then refuses to leave.

He has published five collections of short stories, six collections of plays and street plays, and four novels.

== Early life and education ==
Syed Asghar Wajahat was born on 5 July 1946 in the city of Fatehpur, in Fatehpur district, Uttar Pradesh. He completed his MA (Hindi) in 1968, and his PhD in 1974, also from Aligarh Muslim University (AMU). Later he did post-doctoral research at Jawaharlal Nehru University, Delhi (1981–83).

== Academic career ==
He joined Jamia Millia Islamia, New Delhi, in 1971 as a lecturer of Hindi, and later became a professor and head of the department of Hindi. He was also the director of the A.J. Kidwai Mass Communication Research Centre at Jamia Millia Islamia.

== Writing ==
By 1960, while still studying at the Aligarh Muslim University, he had already started writing. He has published twenty books including five novels, six full-length plays, five collections of short stories, a travelogue, a collection of street plays and a book on literary criticism. He has been placed among the top ten Hindi writers according to a survey conducted by Outlook in 2007.

His work has been translated into Indian and other languages. A collection of his short stories in English, Lies: Half told (ISBN 81-87075-92-9) has been published. An Italian translation of his stories was published by Centro de Studio de documentation, Universitá degli Studio de Venezia, in 1987.

Wajahat writes for newspapers and magazines. He was guest editor of BBC Hindi for three months in 2007. He has been associated with Hindi literary magazines like Hans and Vartaman Sahitya as guest editor for their special issues on "Indian Muslims: Present and Future" and "Pravasi Sahity".

Wajahat has been involved in Hindi cinema as a scriptwriter since 1975. One of his plays was adapted by Rajkumar Santoshi in a film titled Gandhi Godse – Ek Yudh in 2023. He has made documentary films, including a short film about the literary form, the Urdu ghazal.

== Awards ==
He has been honoured by several literary organisations for his contribution to Hindi literature. Indu Sharma Katha Samman, a London-based organisation, gave him the Best novel of the year award in 2005 for his novel Kaisi Aagi Lagai. Wajahat was awarded the 31st Vyas Samman in 2021 for his play Mahabali. The award, presented by the K.K. Birla Foundation, recognises outstanding literary work in Hindi. Mahabali explores the relationship between Mughal emperor Akbar and poet Tulsidas, questioning who the true "Mahabali" is.

== Plays ==
=== Jis Lahore Nai Vekhya, O Jamya E Nai ===
His most noted Partition play, Jis Lahore Nai Vekhya, O Jamya E Nai, was first performed under the direction of Habib Tanvir in 1989, who subsequently took the play to Karachi, Lahore, Sydney, New York and Dubai. The play has also been performed in several regional languages, a version of it has also been directed by theatre director Dinesh Thakur, Satish Mehta from Prayog Theater Group, Bhopal, Abhijeet Choudhary from Swatantra Theatre, Pune.

==== Batwara 1947: Film based on Jis Lahore Nai Vekhya, O Jamya E Nai ====
Directly based on the play Jis Lahore Nai Vekhya, O Jamya E Nai, director Rajkumar Santoshi and producer Aamir Khan are making the drama film, Batwara 1947. The movies stars Sunny Deol and Shabana Azmi in the central roles of Sikander Mirza and Mai, respectively. The movie is set to release on 14 August 2026.

== Bibliography ==
- Jis Lahore Nai Vekhya, O Jamya E Nai (play), Dinman Prakashan, Delhi.
- Lies: Half Told; translated by Rakshanda Jalil; 2002, Srishti Publishers. ISBN 81-87075-92-9.
- Kaisi Aagi Lagai (Novel)
- Andhere se, collection of short stories with Pankaj Bisht, Bhasha Publication, New Delhi.
- Hindi Kahani, Punarmulyankan (criticism), co-editor, Bhasha Publication, New Delhi.
- Dilla Pahuncna hai, collection of short stories, Prakashan Sansthan, Delhi.
- Nishant ke Sahyatri, translation of Qurratul-ain-Haider's Urdu Novel, Joanpah, Delhi.
- Hindi Urdu ka pragatioeal kavita, criticism, McMillan, Delhi.
- Firangi Laut Aaye (Play),
- Inna ka avaz (Play), Prakasan Sansthan, Delhi
- Veergati (play), Vaya Prakashan, Delhi.
- Aki (Play), Granth Ketan, 1/11244-C, Nikat Kirti Mandir, Subhash Park, Naveen Shahdra, delhi
- Nazeer Akbarabadi, translation of criticism by Prof. Mohd. Hasan, Sahitya Akademi, Delhi.
- Swimming pool collection of short stories, Rajkamal, Delhi.
- Bund Bund script of TV series, Radha Kasya, Delhi.
- Sab se sasta gosht, collection of street plays, Gagan Bharta, Delhi.
- Pak napak (play), Prem Prakashan Mandir
- Sab kaha kuch, collection of short stories, Kitab Ghar, New Delhi.
- Sat asman (Novel), Rajkamal Prakashan, Delhi.
- Kaisi Aagi lagaee (Novel), Rajkamal, New Delhi
- Chalte to achcha tha, (Travelogue), Rajkamal, New Delhi
- Barkha Rachaee, (Novel) Rajkamal, New Delhi
- Man mati, (Nvel), Rajkamal, New Delhi
- Patkath lekhan-vyanharik nirdeshika, Rajkamal, New Delhi
- Raste ki talash me, (Travelogue) Antika, New Delhi
- Mushkil kaam, Kitab Ghar Prakashan
