= 1947 partition =

1947 Partition may refer to:

- Partition Plan for Palestine, a United Nations resolution that recommended the creation of independent Arab and Jewish States within Mandatory Palestine
- Partition of India, the partition of the British India into India and Pakistan
  - Batwara 1947 (lit. 'Partition 1947'), a 2026 Indian drama film by Rajkumar Santoshi based on Asghar Wajahat's Hindi play Jis Lahore Nai Vekhya, O Jamya E Nai

== See also ==
- Partition plan (disambiguation)
