= Peddi (soundtrack) =

2026 soundtrack album by A. R. Rahman

- Soundtrack album cover

Soundtrack album by A. R. Rahman
- Released: 28 May 2026
- Recorded: 2024–2025
- Studios: Panchathan Record Inn, Chennai
- Genre: Feature film soundtrack
- Length: 16:30
- Language: Telugu
- Label: T-Series
- Producer: A. R. Rahman

A. R. Rahman chronology
Gandhi Talks (2026)	Peddi (2026)	Main Vaapas Aaunga (2026)

Peddi is the soundtrack album composed by A. R. Rahman for the 2026 Telugu-language sports action drama film of the same name directed by Buchi Babu Sana. The film's stars Ram Charan in the titular role, alongside Shiva Rajkumar, Janhvi Kapoor, Jagapathi Babu, Divyenndu and Boman Irani. The album featured four songs with lyrics written by Balaji and Anantha Sriram. The soundtrack album was released though T-Series on 28 May 2026.

== Background and production ==
In July 2023, it was announced that A. R. Rahman would compose music for the film, in his maiden collaboration between Charan and Buchi Babu. It also marked Rahman's return to Telugu cinema nearly a decade since Sahasam Swasaga Sagipo (2016). Rahman received a renumeration of ₹8 crore (US$830,000) for working on this project.

Rahman worked on three songs for the film by March 2024. Buchi Babu recalled that when he visited a music sitting session in Dubai, with Rahman already performing three of the tunes, he rejected it as he felt it was not impressive. Rahman agreed to his decision and provided him more tunes thereafter. Rahman emphasized on creating a sound that fit the world of the film, that was not only rooted in its earthy elements but also having a global appeal.

While composing "Chikiri Chikiri", Buchi stated that he wanted Rahman to bring the energy and soulfulness of "Humma Humma" from Bombay (1995). The song "chikiri" (transl. lovely or beautiful woman) was inspired by the women from Buchi Babu's village. The lyrics for the song was written by Balaji, initially recalled that he was supposed to write lyrics for the songs in Buchi Babu's debut Uppena (2021) that did not materialize at that time. Balaji wrote the song lyrics overnight, and mostly had a local North Andhra flavor owing to Charan's character and the linguistic setting.

The rest of the songs were written by Anantha Sriram. The music rights of the film were acquired by T-Series for ₹35 crore (US$3.6 million).

== Music videos ==
The song "Chikiri Chikiri", "Rai Rai Raa Raa" and "Hellallallo" was choreographed by Jani Master. "Chikiri Chikiri" was filmed at Savalya Ghat, Pune. In April 2026, Shruti Haasan was joined for a special appearance in an item number of "Hellallallo", which was filmed in Hyderabad.

== Release ==
The first single titled "Chikiri Chikiri" was released on 7 November 2025. The second single titled "Rai Rai Raa Raa" was released on 2 March 2026. The third single titled "Hellallallo" was released on 23 May 2026 at a launch event held in Bhopal. The soundtrack album including four songs was released on 28 May 2026 a week prior to the film's release.

== Track listing ==
=== Telugu ===
No.	Title	Lyrics	Singer(s)	Length
1.	"Chikiri Chikiri"	Balaji	Mohit Chauhan	4:33
2.	"Rai Rai Raa Raa"	Anantha Sriram	A. R. Rahman	4:27
3.	"Hellallallo"	Anantha Sriram	Rakshita Suresh	3:49
4.	"Massa Massa"	Anantha Sriram	Vishal Mishra, Rakshita Suresh, Deepthi Suresh	3:42
Total length:				16:30

=== Tamil ===
No.	Title	Lyrics	Singer(s)	Length
1.	"Chikiri Chikiri"	Vivek	A. R. Ameen	4:33
2.	"Rai Rai Raa Raa"	Vivek	Yugendran	4:27
3.	"Hellallallo"	Snehan	Andrea Jeremiah, Rakshita Suresh	3:49
4.	"Massa Massa"	Vivek	Adithya RK	3:42
Total length:				16:30

=== Hindi ===
All lyrics are written by Raqueeb Alam.

No.	Title	Singer(s)	Length
1.	"Chikiri Chikiri"	Mohit Chauhan	4:33
2.	"Rai Rai Raa Raa"	Nakash Aziz	4:27
3.	"Hellallallo"	Heer	3:49
4.	"Massa Massa"	Nitish Aher	3:42
Total length:			16:30

== Non-single album ==
Track listing
No.	Title	Singer(s)	Length
1.	"Peddi First Shot OST"	Rakshita Suresh, Deepthi Suresh	0:59
2.	"Peddi Pehelwan OST"		0:51
3.	"Village Rocker"	A. R. Rahman, Nitesh Aher	3:43
Total length:			5:55

== Background score ==
Peddi

Film score by A. R. Rahman
- Released: 11 July 2026
- Recorded: 2024–2025
- Studios: Panchathan Record Inn, Chennai
- Genre: Feature film score
- Length: 19:48
- Language: Telugu
- Label: T-Series
- Producer: A. R. Rahman

The original score album was released on 11 July 2026. The album accompanied nine tracks with three songs written by Ganesh Saladi and Mittapalli Surender, and performed by Mahalingam, Sarath Santosh, Shakthisree Gopalan and late Bamba Bakya (whose vocals were generated through AI).

Track listing
No.	Title	Lyrics	Artist(s)	Length
1.	"Suri's Lament"	Ganesh Saladi	Mahalingam	1:56
2.	"Peddi's Rage"		A. R. Rahman	1:47
3.	"Gowri Naidu"		A. R. Rahman	1:52
4.	"Peddi Hits Back"		A. R. Rahman	1:14
5.	"Land Slide"		A. R. Rahman	1:58
6.	"Sisodiya - Sworn Enemies"		A.R. Rahman	1:53
7.	"Delhi Song"	Mittapalli Surender	Sarath Santosh	3:43
8.	"Peddi's Triumph"		A.R. Rahman	3:26
9.	"Peddi's Lullaby"	Mittapalli Surender	Shakthisree Gopalan, Bamba Bakya	1:59
Total length:				19:48

== Reception ==
Fenil Seta of Bollywood Hungama-based critic considered the music to be "functional" with "Chikir Chikiri" being the standout song largely due to its choreography. Sangeetha Devi Dundoo of The Hindu described Rahman's score as one of the major technical aspects as it "shifts seamlessly from the rousing energy of the cricket matches to more emotionally resonant territory as the narrative evolves". Yashaswini Sri of The Indian Express considered Rahman's music being "the film’s most consistent technical achievement" adding that the songs were "a departure from the kind of commercially safe music" being common in big-budget star-led films. She further added that the score "does real heavy lifting in the second half, particularly from the pre-interval sequence onward, pulling several scenes toward emotional territory that the writing alone does not quite reach."

Neeshita Nyayapati of Hindustan Times described it as a "stellar music" from Rahman. B. V. S. Prakash of Deccan Chronicle wrote "A.R. Rahman provides some much-needed support with few numbers and background score, elevating several otherwise dull sequences". T. Maruthi Acharya of India Today considered it as one of Rahman's recent best works, adding that despite the "songs [taking] time to settle, [...] the background score rarely misses a beat" and constantly strengthens the film's emotional moments. Acharya further admitted that "[the] layering of themes, recurring motifs and inventive instrumentation serves as a reminder of why he remains one of cinema's most revered composers." However, Sreeju Sudhakaran of Rediff.com summarized that "It was disappointing to see A R Rahman following the Ravi Basrur school of scoring, flooding scenes with loud background music whether they need it or not".

== Controversy ==
After the success of the song "Chikiri Chikiri", in November 2025, Jani shared a post with him and Rahman expressing his opportunity to work with the composer. Rahman received backlash for his association with Jani, who was an accused sex offender convicted and released on conditional bail, and questioned his "hypocritical" stance for allegedly enabling Jani while pointing out on how he ended his association with his then-norm lyricist Vairamuthu following accusations of sexual assault on the latter. As of 2026, the charges against Jani were not being closed.

Following the release of "Hellallallo", many social media users criticized on how the choreography of the song being "vulgar" and objectifies women. In defense, lyricist Anantha Sriram claimed that criticisms should be clear and specific rather than driven by emotions and admitted that item numbers being a "special dish" for those who enjoyed such numbers for what they are.

== Chart performance ==
Chart (2026)	Peak position
US World Albums (Billboard)	35

Chart	Song	Peak position	Ref.
India (Billboard)	"Chikiri Chikiri"	5	
India (Billboard)	"Rai Rai Raa Raa"	13	
Asian Music Chart (OCC)	"Chikiri Chikiri"	6	
Asian Music Chart (OCC)	"Rai Rai Raa Raa"	19	
Asian Music Chart (OCC)	"Hellallallo"	24	

== Personnel ==
Credits adapted from T-Series:

- Music composer, producer, arranger and programmer: A. R. Rahman
- Additional programming: Prashanth Venkat, Santhosh Dhayanidhi, Suryansh, Raghav PR, Siddharth Narayanan, Srikanth Krishna
- Music supervisor: Prashanth Venkat
- Project manager: Karthik Sekaran
- Studios: Panchathan Record Inn, Chennai
- Recording engineers: Suresh Permal, Karthik Sekaran, Sathish V Saravanan, Bharath Arjunan, Sharan
- Mixing: Nitish R Kumar, Riyasdeen Riyan, Pradeep Menon
- Mastering: Nitish R Kumar, Pradeep Menon
- Technical lead: Riyasdeen Riyan
- Musicians coordinator: R Samidurai, Abdul Haiyum

Musicians

- Guitars: Keba Jeremiah, Renin Raphael
- Flute: Kareem Kamalakar
- Violin: Raghavasimhan Sankaranarayanan
- Accordion: Karthik Devaraj
- Dilruba: Saroja
- Sarangi: Manonmani
- Veena: Usija Nachiyaar
- Indian percussions: Hariprasadh
- Strings: Sunshine Orchestra, Budapest Scoring Orchestra
- String conductor: Jerry Vincent, Zoltan Pad
- Budapest Orchestra Indian representative: Balasubramanian G
- Session producer: Bálint Sapszon
- Session engineer: Viktor Szabó, Denes Radly at Rottenblier Hall, Utica
- Librarian: Anna Sapszo, Kati Reti
- Ethnic strings: Subhani
- Choral arrangement: Arjun Chandy
- Additional rhythm: Kalyan, Kumaran Sivamani
- Vocal supervision: Sarath Santhosh, Suryansh, Raghav PR
- Vocal producer: Sarath Santhosh
