= 2019 Gandhi March =

2019 Gandhi March- PadYatra
- Official Logo
- Native name: ગાંધી પદયાત્રા
- Date: 16–22 January 2019
- Location: Bhavnagar district, Gujarat, India
- Type: Cultural march
- Theme: "Towards Gandhian Principles and Values"
- Motive: To celebrate the 150th birth anniversary of Mahatma Gandhi and to spread Gandhian philosophy
- Organised by: Mansukh L. Mandaviya
- Participants: 150 marchers, 12000 participants
- Website: gandhi150padyatra.in

The Mahatma Gandhi 150th Birth Anniversary Year Padyatra or 2019 Gandhi March or "Gandhi Kooch" was a cultural march held during the celebration of 150th birth anniversary of Mahatma Gandhi in Bhavnagar district of Gujarat, India. The 150km long march lasted for seven days from 16 January 2019 to 22 January 2019. The event was organized by Mansukh L. Mandaviya, the then Union Minister of State for Ports, Shipping and Waterways and Union Minister of State for Chemical and Fertilizer, now Union Health and Family Welfare Minister of India and a Rajya Sabha member from Gujarat. The march passed through 150 villages of Gujarat with 150 prominent followers of Gandhi as स्थायी पदयात्री (Permanent PadYatri) while thousands of People joined the Padyatra Every day and Experienced the Gandhian Philosophy of Life. The aim of the march was to spread awareness for method of 'Basic Education' or 'Buniyadi Shikshan' an Education Method given by Mahatma Gandhi among public and to introduce the Gandhian philosophy to young generation.

== Timeline ==
The theme of the Padyatra was "Towards Gandhian Principles and Values". The route of the march, along with each evening's stopping place, was planned from the villages which have Nai Talim institutes, conceptualized by Gandhi.

The march began on 16 January 2019 from Gram Dakshinamurti and was concluded at Sanosara, a village in the Bhavnagar district. It covered total 150 villages and total 150km distance. On the first day, Mandaviya started the march involving 150 people with tree plantation and explained the connection between Gandhian philosophy and nature. On the next day, the marchers passed through Samdhiyara, Dihor, Bhadravar and reached Mayadhar. As they entered each village, crowds greeted the marchers. Morari Bapu, a spiritual leader, gave speech about the unity of all religions and said "universalism never binds anyone". On the morning of the third day, the march began from Mayadhar and the marchers travelled through Pingari, lakhawada, Anida, Mandavda and Bhutiya, and arrived at Shetrunji Dam. Total 150 programs on Gandhian philosophy were held en route.

The march was concluded at Lokbharti Gramvidyapith, Sanosara. It was ended with a speech by Vijay Rupani, chief minister of Gujarat, at concluding ceremony. Rupani stated that the dream of establishing 'Ram Rajya' (rule of Rama, Gandhi's concept of Utopia) in India according to the contemplation of Gandhi should acquire a holistic approach rather than an isolated one to promote the welfare of the society. The prime minister Narendra Modi delivered a speech through live telecast from Delhi.

== Reception ==
About 20,000 youngsters registered and about 12,000 youngsters participated in the march. During the seven days of march, 14 public gatherings were arranged which were addressed by various politicians, social activists, journalists and artists. Actor Deepak Antani, widely known for portraying Mahatma Gandhi, also took part in the events to promote Gandhian values through his performances and public appearances.
