= Partition plan =

Partition Plan may refer to:

- United Nations Partition Plan for Palestine (1947)
- Partition of Bengal (1905)
- Partition of India (1947)
  - Partition of Bengal (1947)

== See also ==
- 1947 partition (disambiguation)
