= Mansukh Mandaviya =

Indian politician (born 1972)

Mansukh Laxmanbhai Mandaviya
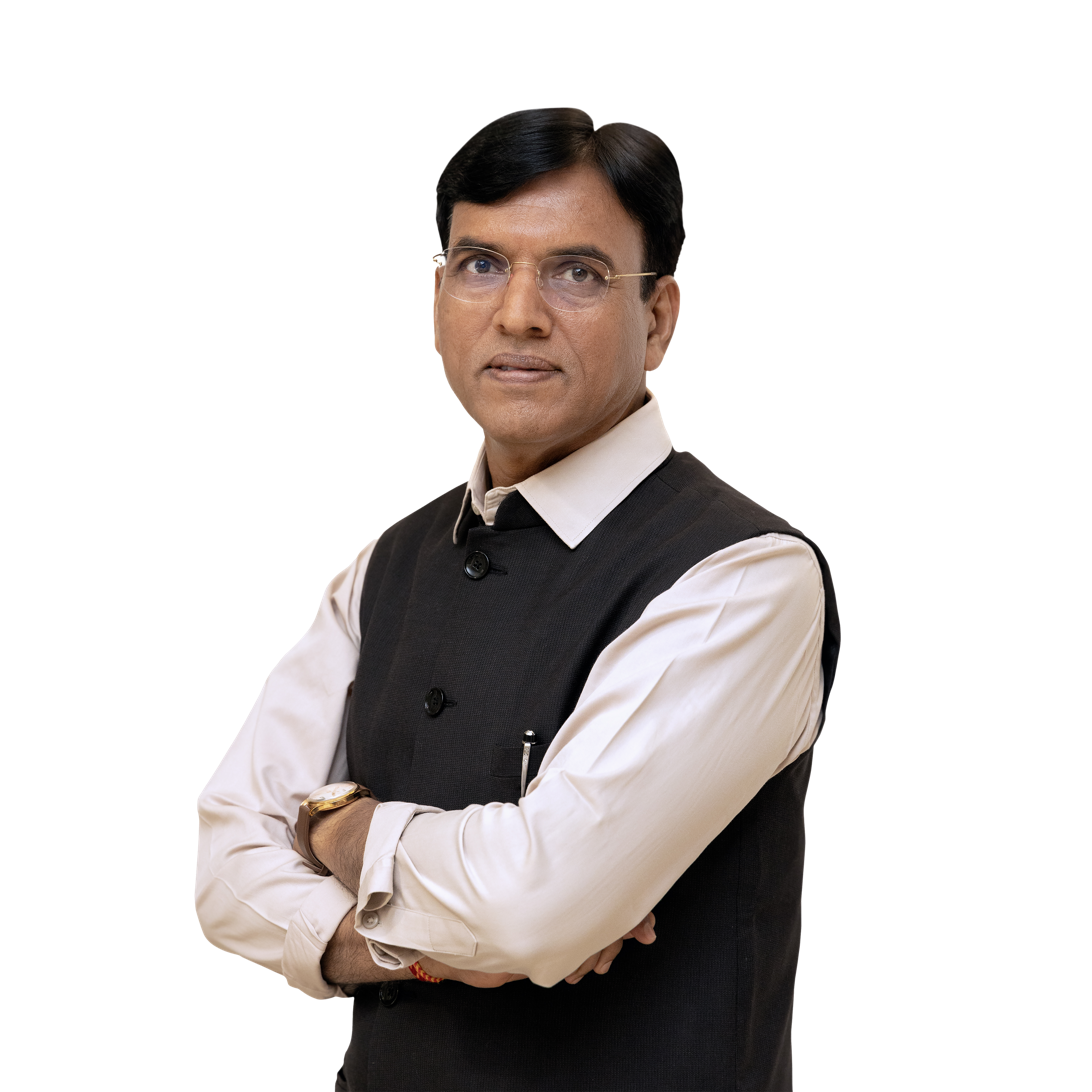
- Parliament portrait, 2024

38th Union Minister of Labour and Employment
- Incumbent
- Assumed office 10 June 2024
- President: Droupadi Murmu
- Prime Minister: Narendra Modi
- Preceded by: Bhupender Yadav

21st Union Minister of Youth Affairs and Sports
- Incumbent
- Assumed office 10 June 2024
- Prime Minister: Narendra Modi
- Preceded by: Anurag Thakur

Union Minister of Chemicals & Fertilisers and Health & Family Welfare
- In office 7 July 2021 – 10 June 2024
- Prime Minister: Narendra Modi
- Preceded by: D. V. Sadananda Gowda (as Minister of Chemicals and Fertilizers); Dr. Harsh Vardhan (as Minister of Health and Family Welfare)
- Succeeded by: J. P. Nadda

Union Minister of Ports, Shipping and Waterways
- In office 31 May 2019 – 7 July 2021
- Prime Minister: Narendra Modi
- Preceded by: Nitin Gadkari
- Succeeded by: Sarbananda Sonowal

Union Minister of State for Road Transport and Highways
- In office 5 July 2016 – 30 May 2019
- Minister: Nitin Gadkari
- Preceded by: Krishan Pal Gurjar
- Succeeded by: Vijay Kumar Singh

Union Minister of State for Ports, Shipping and Waterways
- In office 5 July 2016 – 30 May 2019
- Minister: Nitin Gadkari
- Preceded by: Pon Radhakrishnan
- Succeeded by: Shantanu Thakur

Member of Parliament, Lok Sabha
- Incumbent
- Assumed office 4 June 2024
- Preceded by: Rameshbhai Dhaduk
- Constituency: Porbandar, Gujarat

Member of Parliament, Rajya Sabha
- In office 24 April 2012 – 24 April 2024
- Preceded by: Kanjibhai Patel
- Constituency: Gujarat

Chairman of Gujarat Agro Industries Corporation Limited
- In office 2011–2012

Member of Gujarat Legislative Assembly
- In office 2002–2007
- Preceded by: constituency established
- Succeeded by: Mahendrasinh Sarvaiya
- Constituency: Palitana

Personal details
- Born: 1 June 1972 (age 54) Hanol, Gujarat, India
- Party: Bharatiya Janata Party
- Spouse: Neetaben Mandaviya (m. 1995)
- Children: 2
- Education: M.A., Ph.D.
- Alma mater: M.A. in political science from Bhavnagar University; Ph.D. from Gujarat Institute of Development Research
- Profession: Politician
- Website: mansukhmandaviya.in

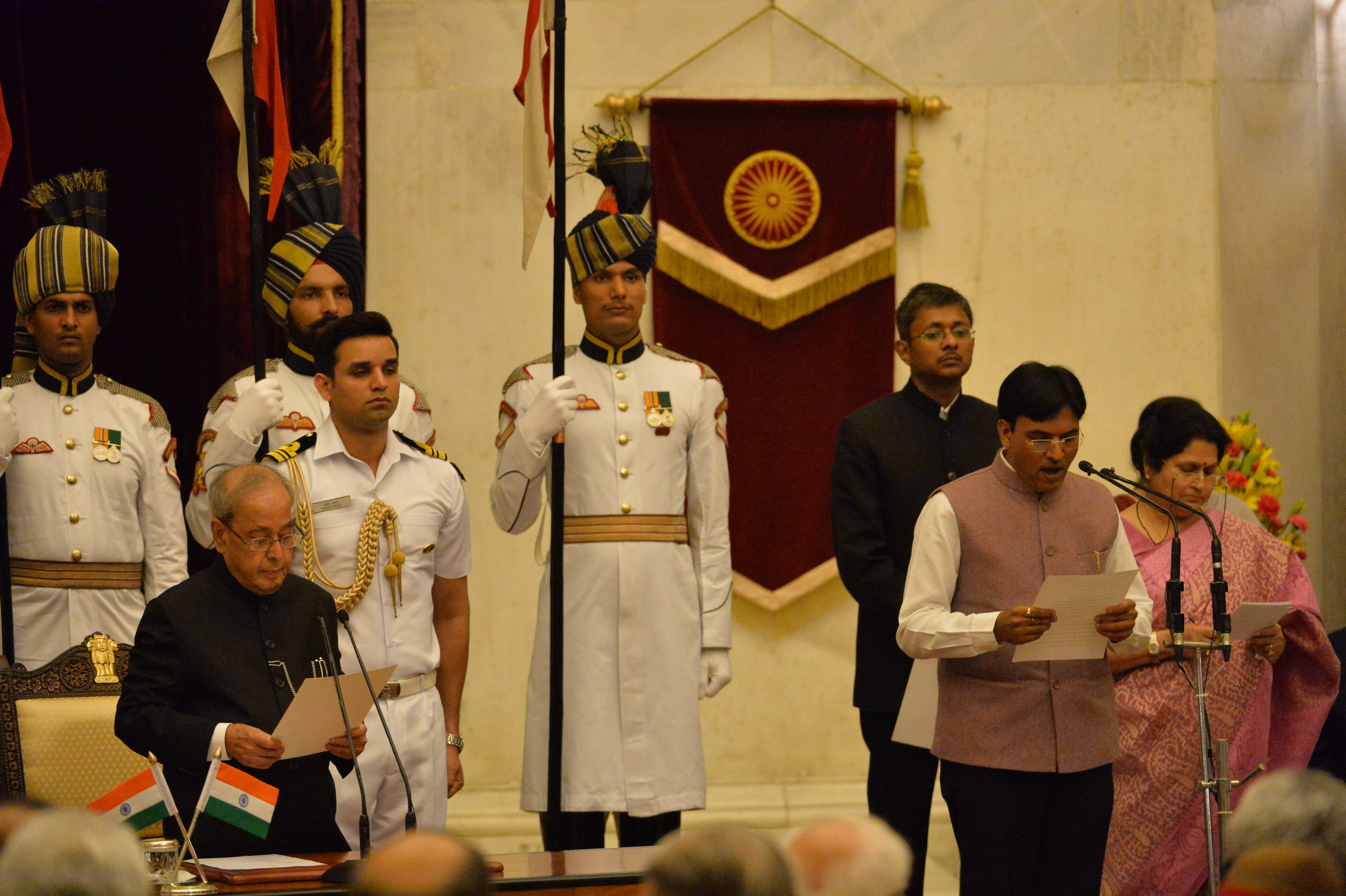
Mandaviya taking oath as Union Minister of State in 2016

Mansukh Laxmanbhai Mandaviya (born 1 June 1972) is an Indian politician who is serving as the 17th Minister of Labour and Employment and 19th Minister of Youth Affairs and Sports since 2024. He is also a Member of Parliament, Lok Sabha from Porbandar, Gujarat.

== Early life ==
Mandaviya was born in a small village named Hanol in Palitana Taluka of Bhavnagar district of Gujarat State. Born to a middle-class farmer family, he is the youngest amongst four brothers. He completed his primary education from the Government Primary School, Hanol and his high school studies from Songadh Gurukul.

After completion of HSC, he did a certificate course in Veterinary Live Stock Inspector and has been educated at Songadh Gurukul and Gujarat Agriculture University, Gujarat. He later completed his MA in political science from Bhavnagar University.

In 2021, Mandaviya obtained a Ph.D. in political science from Gujarat Institute of Development Research.

== Political career ==
Mansukh Mandaviya is currently the Minister of Youth Affairs and Sports and the Minister of Labour and Employment.

=== Positions served ===
- 2002-2007: Member of the Gujarat Legislative Assembly for Palitana
- 2010: Chairman, Gujarat Agro Industries Corporation Limited
- 2012-2018: Member of Rajya Sabha
- 2013: State Secretary of BJP, Gujarat.
- 2015: Youngest General Secretary of BJP, Gujarat
- 2016-2019: Minister of State for Ministry of Road Transport and Highways, Ministry of Shipping and Ministry of Chemicals and Fertilizers
- 2018 - 2 April 2024: Re-elected as Member of Rajya Sabha
- 2019: Minister of State (Independent Charge) for Ports, Shipping and Waterways and Minister of State for Chemicals and Fertilizers
- 2021: Union Minister of Health and Family Welfare India and Minister for Chemicals and Fertilizers
- 2024–Present: Union Minister of Labour and Employment
- 2024–Present: Union Minister of Youth Affairs and Sports

=== Gujarat state leader ===
He became a member of the Akhil Bharatiya Vidyarthi Parishad (ABVP) and soon became a State Executive Committee Member of ABVP, Gujarat Unit. He was appointed a leader of Yuva Morcha and then the President of BJP Unit of Palitana. Mr. Mandaviya also became the youngest Member of the Legislative Assembly (MLA) in Gujarat, when he was first elected in 2002. After his tenure, in 2010, he became the chairman of Gujarat Agro Industries Corporation Limited.

=== National politics ===
At the young age of 38, Mansukh Mandaviya was elected as a Member of Parliament (MP) in Rajya Sabha from Gujarat. He was appointed the Secretary for State Unit, BJP Gujarat, in 2013 and General Secretary in 2014. Later, in 2014, he was appointed the Gujarat State Incharge of BJP's High-tech & Mega Membership Drive Campaign.

== MoS Road Transport and Highways, Shipping and Chemicals and Fertilizers ==
On 5 July 2016, Mansukh Mandaviya was sworn in as the Minister of State for Road Transport and Highways, Shipping and Chemicals and Fertilizers, in the Government of India. He was re-elected for a second term as an MP in Rajya Sabha in March 2018.

In the Asian continent, he has visited China, Israel, Oman, Nepal, Dubai and Uzbekistan. He has also visited European countries including England, Germany and Hungary, along with South American countries such as Brazil and Argentina. The African continent has also been explored by Mr. Mandaviya, including the countries of Kenya, Uganda, Tanzania, Rwanda, Algeria, Equatorial Guinea, Eswatini and Zambia. In the Oceania Region, he has visited New Zealand, Tonga, Fiji and Australia.

=== MoS Ministry of Ports, Shipping and Waterways ===
In May 2019, Mansukh Mandaviya took oath as a Minister of State in the Council of Ministers, Government of India. He was the Minister of State (Independent Charge) in the Ministry of Ports, Shipping and Waterways, along with being the Minister of State for Chemicals and Fertilizers. Mr. Mandaviya also represented India in the World Economic Forum at Davos, Switzerland in January 2020.

=== Minister of Health and Family Welfare and Chemicals and Fertilizers ===
Mansukh Mandaviya took charge as the Minister of Health and Family Welfare in the Government of India on 7 July 2021, with an additional charge of the Ministry of Chemicals and Fertilisers.

=== Minister of Labour and Employment ===
On 11 June 2024, Mansukh Mandaviya took charge of the office of the Union Minister of Labour & Employment.

The Ministry is committed to protecting and safeguarding the rights and interests of workers, particularly those from underprivileged, marginalized, and disadvantaged segments of society.

=== Minister of Youth Affairs and Sports ===
On the same day, 11 June 2024, Mansukh Mandaviya assumes charge as Union Minister of Youth Affairs and Sports in Shastri Bhawan.

The Ministry of Youth Affairs and Sports oversees two departments: the Department of Youth Affairs and the Department of Sports. It is responsible for the development and promotion of youth initiatives and sports in the country, with a focus on providing infrastructure, training, and programs to foster the growth of youth and sports.

== Awards and recognition ==
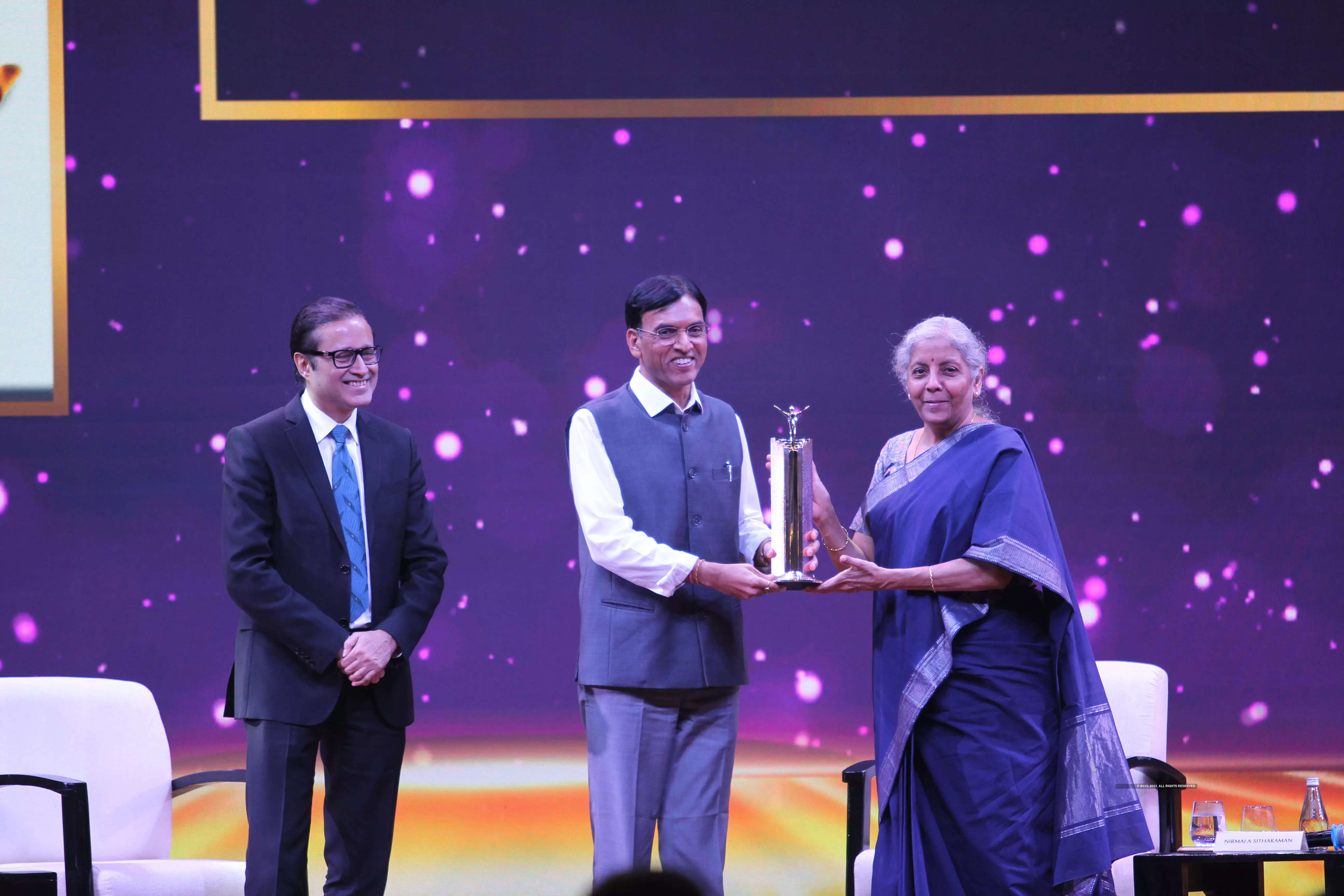
Mansukh Mandaviya awarded with ET Business Reformer of the year Award 2022

Mandaviya was honored by UNICEF for his contribution to women health-care initiatives and for distributing 10 crore sanitary napkins through Jan Aushadhi Kendras.

He was also honored by The Economic Times with the Business Reformer of the Year Award 2022 for Corporate Excellence. Credited with raising India's vaccination coverage to more than 70%, his leadership during and after the pandemic has been instrumental in the economy bouncing back from Covid.

India’s renowned newspaper The Indian Express in its prestigious list of 100 Most Powerful Indians in 2022 & 2023 placed him at number 25 & 27 respectively for boosting 'COVID-19 vaccination and improving the overall healthcare system.'

== Initiatives ==
- In 2004, he organized a 123 km long Padyatra, titled "Kanya Kelavani Jyot Padyatra" for the 'Beti Bachao, Beti Padhao' social campaign for 45 educational backward villages of his constituency.
- In 2006, he organized a 127 km Padyatra connecting 52 villages of his constituency with the title "Beti Bachao-Beti Padhao, Vyasan Hatao".
- As a part of the 150th Anniversary of Mahatma Gandhi's birth, Mandaviya undertook a 150 km long Padyatra. He started the Padyatra with a tree plantation drive and explained the connection between Gandhian thoughts and nature. Actor Deepak Antani, known for his portrayal of Mahatma Gandhi, also participated in the padyatra to spread Gandhian values. Mandaviya also flagged off a 22,000 km, 3-month-long bike journey by three youngsters from Surat.
- In October 2023, He initiated E-Clearance for Afterlife Remains portal to conduct clearance procedures to timely transportation of human remains. (dead body) across international borders.
- In July 2024, he led the launch of Phase 2 of the Khelo India Rising Talent Identification (KIRTI) programme in New Delhi. The initiative focuses on identifying young sports talent using modern technology, aiming for 20 lakh assessments across India in FY 2024-25. It seeks to support young athletes aged 9 to 18 and to use sports as a means to address drug addiction and excessive screen time.
- In October 2024, he launched the “eShram – One Stop Solution” in New Delhi. The platform aims to simplify the registration process for unorganised workers and connect them to various government welfare schemes, providing seamless access to social security benefits. The initiative integrates data from multiple Central Ministries and schemes, such as the One Nation One Ration Card and Mahatma Gandhi National Rural Employment Guarantee Act, into a unified portal. Over 30 crore workers had registered on the eShram platform by 2024.

== Personal life ==
Mansukh Mandaviya is married to Neetaben Mandaviya and they have two children.

Preceded by Nitin Gadkari	Minister of Shipping; 31 May 2019 - 10 November 2020; Minister of State with Independent Charge	Succeeded by Renamed as Ministry of Ports, Shipping and Waterways; Mansukh Mandaviya; Minister of State with Independent Charge
Preceded by Earlier known as Ministry of Shipping; Mansukh Mandaviya; Minister of State with Independent Charge	Minister of Ports, Shipping and Waterways; 10 November 2020 - 7 July 2021	Succeeded by Sarbananda Sonowal
Preceded by Sadananda Gowda	Minister of Chemicals and Fertilizers; 7 July 2021 - 9 June 2024	Succeeded by J. P. Nadda
Preceded by Harsh Vardhan	Minister of Health and Family Welfare; 7 July 2021 - Present	Incumbent
