= Goti Lo =

2025 Indian Gujarati Family drama film

- Official Poster
- Directed by: Deepak Antani
- Written by: Gaurang Bhavsar; Ashok Upadhyaya
- Produced by: Gaurang Bhavsar; Prasand Patel (co-producer); Deepak Antani (Executive producer)
- Starring: Manoj Joshi; Mehul Buch; Manav Rao; Bhavya Sirohi
- Cinematography: Roopang Acharya
- Edited by: Roopang Acharya
- Music by: Samir Mana
- Production companies: Pragatya Films; ISH Creations (USA)
- Distributed by: Rupam Entertainment Pvt Ltd
- Release date: 27 June 2025
- Running time: 120 minutes
- Country: India
- Language: Gujarati

Goti Lo is a 2025 Indian Gujarati family drama film directed by Deepak Antani and written by Gaurang Bhavsar and Ashok Upadhyaya. It Stars Manoj Joshi, Mehul Buch, Manav Rao, Bhavya Sirohi, Makrand Annapurna and others. The film is produced by Gaurang Bhavsar and co-produced by Prasand Patel and it was released on 27 June 2025.

== Plot ==
Goti Lo is a heartwarming story about Nilkanthrai Mehta, a village elder in Sundarpur who feels isolated after the loss of his wife. Longing for family connection, he invents a plan with an imaginary friend, Chandu, to bring his children and grandchildren, now living busy lives in cities and abroad, back to their ancestral home. Though they return, the family remains immersed in the virtual world of phones and gadgets, unable to engage with the real world around them. When Mehta announces that their ancestral home, Mehta Bhuvan, will be handed over to be turned into an old-age home, the family is shocked. In an attempt to stop the decision, they are challenged to win a traditional games competition. As the family begins to participate, they slowly rediscover the value of childhood memories, cultural roots and real-life connections.

== Cast ==
- Manoj Joshi
- Mehul Buch
- Manav Rao
- Bhavya Sirohi
- Makrand Annapurna
- Dipen Raval
- Ravi Omprakash Rao
- Jahanvi Patel
- Vishal Thakkar
- Sweta Raval
- Satvi Choksi
- Mitesh Prajapati
- Ashok Upadhyaya

== Soundtrack ==
Goti Lo

Studio album by Samir Mana
- Released: 2025
- Recorded: 2025
- Genre: Feature film soundtrack
- Length: 7:32
- Language: Gujarati
- Label: Pragatya Films
External audio
- Goti Lo Full Album on JioSaavn

=== Tracklist ===
All lyrics are written by Deepak Antani, Ramesh Parekh; all music is composed by Samir Mana.

No.	Title	Lyrics	Music	Singer(s)	Length
1.	"Goti Lo Title Track"	Deepak Antani	Samir Mana	Raag Mehta	3:36
2.	"Hu Ne Chandu"	Ramesh Parekh	Samir Mana	Manav Rao	3:56
Total length:					07:32

== Production ==
The film was shot in Bamna village, the birthplace of renowned poet Late Shri Umashankar Joshi, as well as in other scenic locations across the Sabarkantha district, known for their natural beauty comparable to international destinations.

== Marketing and release ==
The film was officially announced on 17 May 2025 with a motion poster and release date shared on social media platforms. The film's Title track was launched on 3 June 2025 on YouTube and other music platforms. A popular children’s song from the film was released on 10 June 2025. The trailer was officially launched on 16 April 2025 at the box cricket and pickleball court of Seven 11 & Evara Eatery in Ahmedabad and was simultaneously released on YouTube and other social media platforms. The film was released nationwide on 27 June 2025, coinciding with Ratha Yatra.

== See also ==
- List of Gujarati films of 2025
- List of Gujarati films
