= Main Vaapas Aaunga (soundtrack) =

2026 film soundtrack album

- Soundtrack album cover

Soundtrack album by A. R. Rahman
- Released: 10 June 2026
- Recorded: 2025–2026
- Studios: Panchathan Record Inn, Chennai; Panchathan Studios, Mumbai; YRF Studios, Mumbai; The Sanctuary, Mumbai
- Genre: Feature film soundtrack
- Length: 33:33
- Language: Hindi
- Label: Tips Music
- Producer: A. R. Rahman

A. R. Rahman chronology
Peddi (2026)	Main Vaapas Aaunga (2026)	Batwara 1947 (2026)
External audio
- Main Vaapas Aaunga – Full Album on YouTube

Singles from Main Vaapas Aaunga
- 1. "Kya Kamaal Hai" Released: 17 April 2026; 2. "Maskara" Released: 5 May 2026; 3. "Vo Nahin" Released: 14 May 2026; 4. "Ishq Mastana" Released: 2 June 2026

Main Vaapas Aaunga is the soundtrack album composed by A. R. Rahman to the 2026 Hindi-language romantic drama film of the same name directed by Imtiaz Ali starring Diljit Dosanjh, Naseeruddin Shah, Sharvari and Vedang Raina. The album featured eight songs with lyrics written by Irshad Kamil and released through Tips Music on 10 June 2026.

== Production and composition ==
Main Vaapas Aaunga marked the successive reunion of Ali, Rahman and Kamil. Rahman considered the soundtrack as an extension to communicate the film's unspoken emotions shown in the film's story while Ali described the music as the heart of the film as how music being the heart of Punjab. He further added the music of Punjab in 1947 had folk and western influences in the music which Rahman felt excited to showcase and admitted that he and Kamil dwell deeper on the soundscape of the film's music.

=== Lyrics ===
Kamil added that the situations in the film were unique, which led to the writing process made more exciting. Having liked to add multiple layers in songs, he added that the idea of "Vo Nahin" came with the thread being woven to mean many things, like "a plea to the beloved and a representation of the pain of the Partition" as that song captures the longing of Keenu who separated from his lover. "Vo Nahin" begins as a love ballad but switches into sufism thereby becoming a harmonious blend of the spiritual oneness. Kamil wrote 4–5 lines of the song and gave it to Rahman, who worked on it and then Kamil had to tweak the lyrics further to suit the music thereby having a broad idea that allows them to travel and completes in an organic way.

"Kya Kamaal Hai" performed by Diljit Dosanjh, was described by Kamil as the writer's dream that wonders on the beauty of the world without any pain, tears and fears. "Tere Paas Main" comes in the crucial point related to the conflict of love and the partition, that provided a simplistic and melancholic ballad. Having liked Rahman's tune, Kamil wanted to bring a particular kind of romantic simplicity and the longing which he underlined with the emotion through its lyrics. "Ishq Mastana" borrowed its lyrics from Kabir's famous poem "haman hai ishq mastana" owing to the directness of the poet that suited the emotional underlining and added that any other lyricist would not provide the same emotional impact. It was the last song that Kamil wrote for the film.

=== Singers ===
The album accompanied 10 debut singers. "Vo Nahin" was performed by Adithya RK in his Hindi playback singing debut. Adithya recalled that Rahman asked to record another song for a film in Hindi, while associating with the composer; having not well-versed in Hindi, Rahman's musical crew helped Adithya on the pronunciations. Adithya recalled that it was surprised for him that the song was included in an Imtiaz Ali film as he was inspired by the director's Rockstar (2011) to foray into playback singing.

The song "Tere Paas Main" featured two version. Deepali Sahay, a former Indian Idol contestant, performed the song's female version. She recalled that during a birthday wish to Rahman (who coincidentally shares his birthday with her), a member of Rahman's musical team contacted her to record a song. She then performed the song at Rahman's home studio in Chennai and the song was transitioned multiple times with rearrangements of notes and change of voices. Prior to the trailer launch, it was then decided that the scale of the song was to be modified, thereby demanding a re-recording of it. Rahman then gave her fifteen minutes to record the song which she did in twenty minutes.

The male version of "Tere Paas Main" was performed by Vipin Aneja. He performed two versions of the song at Rahman's studio in Chennai, along with a final version of the song in Mumbai. Nilanjana Ghosh Dastidar, a bassist, performed the duet song "Maskara" with lead actor Vedang Raina. Dastidar performed the song during a concert tour at United States and recorded the vocals at the makeshift recording studio in the hotel room. Raina, who performed the male portions, considered singing for Rahman "a dream come true moment", while also channelizing Kishore Kumar's way of singing for his character. Other debutant singers involved Antara Nandy, Heer (who had performed a rendition of "Chhap Tilak" from Ginny Wedss Sunny 2 earlier in the year), Nargis Teji, Armaan Khan (who had previously sung "Qubool Hai" from Haq and portions of "Gehra Hua" from Dhurandhar) and Sameer Khan.

== Release ==
The first single titled "Kya Kamaal Hai", was announced on 5 April 2026, where it was recorded on the same date, and the single released on 17 April. The second single "Maskara" was released on 5 May 2026. The third single "Vo Nahin" was released on 14 May. The song "Ishq Mastana" was released as the fourth single on 2 June, coinciding Raina's birthday.

On 7 June 2026, Ali and Rahman, along with Raina, Mohit Chauhan, Dastidar and Pooja Tiwari performed the songs live at the Attari–Wagah border ceremony. The soundtrack album was released through Tips Music on 10 June 2026.

== Track listing ==
No.	Title	Singer(s)	Length
1.	"Kya Kamaal Hai"	Diljit Dosanjh	4:59
2.	"Maskara"	Nilanjana Ghosh Dastidar, Vedang Raina	3:53
3.	"Ishq Mastana"	Mohit Chauhan, Nargis, Pooja Tiwari	4:34
4.	"Vo Nahin"	Adithya RK, Armaan Khan, Sameer Khan	4:47
5.	"Dheere Dheere"	Faheem Abdullah, Shilpa Rao, Antara Nandy, Heer	4:11
6.	"Tere Paas Main" (Female Version)	Deepali Sahay	4:04
7.	"Tere Paas Main" (Male Version)	Vipin Aneja	2:48
8.	"Dariya"	Armaan Khan	4:17
Total length:			33:33

== Reception ==
Vipin Nair of Music Aloud summarized that "15 years since their first outing together, the Imtiaz Ali-A R Rahman-Irshad Kamil team shows no signs of slowing down. And looking purely at ARR’s portfolio as well, this is the best soundtrack that the man has delivered in a long time!" Zico Ghosh of Billboard India wrote "Main Vaapas Aaunga is, among other things, a reminder of the value of artistic continuity. Fifteen years after Rockstar, Ali, Rahman and Kamil are still engaged in the same conversation — about longing, wandering, faith, memory, homecoming — only from a different vantage point. The questions remain the same; the answers keep changing. And sometimes, all it takes to make them feel new again is two ordinary words: Oh yeah." Fenil Seta of Bollywood Hungama, however, considered the film's music being "underwhelming" and failed to created buzz as with most of Rahman's albums, although the film emerged as a sleeper hit thereafter.

== Personnel ==
Credits adapted from Tips Music:

- Music composer, arranger and producer – A. R. Rahman
- Additional programming – Sarthak Kalyani, Shubham Bhat
- Music editor and supervisor – Hiral Viradia
- Studios – Panchathan Record Inn, Chennai; Panchathan Studios, Mumbai; YRF Studios, Mumbai; The Sanctuary, Mumbai
- Recording engineers – Suresh Permal, Karthik Sekaran, Sathish V Saravanan, Bharath Arjunan, Sarath Santhosh, Nitish R. Kumar, Naval Chikhliya, Vijay Dayal, Abhishek Khandelwal, Vedant Uttarkar
- Mixing – Pradvay Sivashankar, P. A. Deepak, Suresh Permal, Nitish R. Kumar
- Stem mastering – Nitish R. Kumar, S. Sivakumar
- Dolby Atmos mastering – Riyasdeen Riyan, Nitish R. Kumar
- Head of technical services – Riyasdeen Riyan

Musicians

- Guitars – Keba Jeremiah, Shrey Gupta
- Bass – Nilanjana Ghosh Dastidar
- Flute – Ashwin Srinivasan, Ashish Venkateswaran, Naveen Kumar, Kamalakar
- Cello – Seenu
- Violin – Rangapriya, Prabhakaran
- Harmonium – Shubham Bhat
- Indian strokes – Tapas Roy
- Indian rhythm – Sanket Naik
- Dholak and dhol – Dipesh Verma, Ratnadeep Jamsandekar
- Percussions – Rajarshi Mitter, Dipesh Verma, Ratnadeep Jamsandekar
- Sarod – Rohan Prasanna
- Sax, rabab and mandolin – S. M. Subhani
- Sitar – Asad Khan
- Tumbi – Hiral Viradia
- Choir – Hriday Gattani, Arjun Chandy, Sarath Santosh, Aravind Srinivasan, Aparna Harikumar, Malavika Rajhesh, Deepthi Suresh, Romy, Soubhagya Mohapatra, Lavita Lobo, Ishan Rojindar, Manikandan Chembai
- Choir arrangement and conductor – Arjun Chandy
- Strings – Budapest Scoring Orchestra, Prague Philarmonic Orchestra, Sunshine Orchestra
- Budapest Orchestra personnel
  - Recording Studio – Rottenbiller Hall, Budapest
  - Conductor – Abel Tompa
  - Orchestra Indian representative – Balasubramanian G
  - Session producer – Bálint Sapszon
  - Engineer – Viktor Szabó
  - Librarian – Anna Sapszo, Kati Reti
  - Orchestrators – Samarth Srinivasan, Nipun Bhatnagar
- Mumbai String Orchestra personnel
  - Performers – Jitendra Hansraj Javda, Dharmendra Jawda, Chandan singh, Raju Padhiyar, Leo velho, Margarita Gapparova
  - Recording Studio – Studio 504, Mumbai
