= Ramayana: Part 1 (soundtrack) =

2026 soundtrack album by Hans Zimmer and A. R. Rahman

- Soundtrack album cover

Soundtrack album by Hans Zimmer and A. R. Rahman
- Released: 21 October 2026
- Recorded: 2023–2026
- Studios: Panchathan Record Inn and AM Studios, Chennai; Panchathan Record Inn, Mumbai; Cafe Musica, Chennai; JAM8 Studios, Mumbai; Resound India, Chennai; New Edge Studios, Mumbai; Rottenblier Studios, Budapest; AIR Studios, London
- Genre: Feature film soundtrack
- Length: 16:45
- Language: Hindi
- Label: T-Series
- Producers: Namit Malhotra; Hans Zimmer; A. R. Rahman
External audio
- Ramayana – Audio Jukebox on YouTube

Hans Zimmer chronology
Euphoria season 3 (2026)	Ramayana: Part 1 (2026)	Dune: Part Three (2026)

A. R. Rahman chronology
Batwara 1947 (2026)	Ramayana: Part 1 (2026)	Inji Vellam (2027)

Singles from Ramayana: Part 1
- 1. "Jai Jai Ram" Released: 14 September 2026; 2. "Ravana Tandav" Released: 20 October 2026

Ramayana: Part 1 is the soundtrack album to the 2026 film of the same name directed by Nitesh Tiwari and produced by Namit Malhotra and Yash under Prime Focus Studios, Monster Mind Creations and DNEG. The film stars Ranbir Kapoor, Yash, Sai Pallavi, Ravi Dubey and Sunny Deol in lead roles. The soundtrack is composed by Hans Zimmer and A. R. Rahman, with lyrics written by Kumar Vishwas.

== Development ==
The film score and soundtrack are composed by Hans Zimmer and A. R. Rahman, marking Zimmer's debut work in Indian cinema. Rahman has described the creative process as "terrifying" and "complicated" due to the epic's cultural significance, noting that the duo is working to blend Zimmer's soundscapes with traditional Indian elements. The score features the integration of Sanskrit verses, which Rahman added to the initial thematic soundscapes developed by Zimmer. Additionally, poet and lyricist Kumar Vishwas contributed lyrics inspired by the film's narrative.

Rahman stated that the collaboration with Zimmer was dated back to 2009, as both of them shared the same agent. Both composers performed at the 84th Academy Awards and then Zimmer also invited Rahman as a co-composer for The Dark Knight Rises (2012), and shared a fond professional relationship over the years. When Rahman went to Zimmer's Remote Control Productions to discuss about their reunion and the overall collaboration, Rahman revealed that Zimmer was excited on the collaborative effort to work together. Namit provided the pitch disk, and initial sketches of Ramayana for Zimmer regarding his approval, however, Zimmer agreed to the project without seeing it, as he believed India's culture and mythological traditions made it important for a global audience.

Rahman met Zimmer several times at London, Los Angeles and Abu Dhabi to work on the film's soundtrack, admitting that a lot of effort had went into create the soundtrack and score, and each song had multiple iterations created with the final version of the songs either ranged from within two iterations or going with 13 iterations for one song. Further complications and difficulties stemmed on how various versions in dubbing, languages and visual effects of the film, having several creative versions, however Rahman wanted to lean into the complexity over resisting it as he felt such creative things led him to be a part and helping the whole process rather than obstructing it.

Both Rahman and Zimmer worked on the soundtrack for three-and-a-half years. The composition and recording sessions spanned five cities, such as Los Angeles, London, Budapest, Mumbai and Chennai. The score was recorded at the AIR Studios in London, with Malhotra supervising the sessions performed by Indian and Western musicians.

== Marketing and release ==
In July 2026, T-Series acquired music rights to both parts of the film in a deal worth around ₹75 crore. Previously, Sony Music India had acquired the music rights, but was transferred to T-Series. Amazon Music served as the music streaming partner.

"Ramayana (The Introduction Theme)", which featured in the film's announcement video, was released in its short version on 3 July 2025. "Rama Theme" was released on 31 July 2026, following the release of the character glimpse from the film featuring Kapoor as Rama. A separate theme from the trailer was also released on 2 August, following the official trailer launch. The first single titled "Jai Jai Ram" featuring Arijit Singh and Shreya Ghoshal, was released on 14 September, coinciding with Ganesh Chaturthi. The second single titled "Ravana Tandav" was released on 20 October, coinciding with Dussehra, sung by Vishal Dadlani and chorus. The full album was released at the event held on 21 October in Chennai Trade Centre, Nandambakkam.

The promotional track titled "Main Ram" was released on 22 October 2026, the track composed by Prateek Walia and sung by Sachet Tandon. The song "Mangal Rang" was released on 25 October, performed by Arijit Singh and Shreya Ghoshal. The song "Judi Jodi" performed by Shreya Ghoshal, was released on 29 October, coinciding with Karva Chauth. The track "Shree Hanuman Chalisa" featuring Diljit Dosanjh, Sukhwinder Singh, Mohit Chauhan, Kailash Kher and Shankar Mahadevan for the first time and glimpse of Sunny Deol as Hanuman was released on 5 November, after the film's release. Another song "Ram Raja Bhi Hain Aur Tapasvi Bhi Hain" composed by lyricist Kumar Vishwas and performed by Jubin Nautiyal was released on the occasion of Diwali, 8 November. The track "O Ragho" composed by Shubham Shirule and performed by Rishabh Raghuvanshi, was released on 15 November 2026.

== Track listing ==
=== Hindi ===
All lyrics are written by Kumar Vishwas.

No.	Title	Music	Singer(s)	Length
1.	"Jai Jai Ram"	A. R. Rahman	Shreya Ghoshal, Arijit Singh	5:20
2.	"Ravana Tandav"	A. R. Rahman	Vishal Dadlani, Omkar Patil, Jasraj Joshi, Aravind Srinivas, Narayanan Ravishankar, Shenbagaraj, Sarath Santosh	3:14
3.	"Sita's Aspiration"	A. R. Rahman	A. R. Ameen, Vaishali Samant, Rakshita Suresh, Antra Nandy	2:42
4.	"Jai Jai Ram" (Orchestral)	Hans Zimmer, A. R. Rahman	Instrumental	3:02
5.	"Rama Theme"	Hans Zimmer, A. R. Rahman	Instrumental	2:27
Total length:				16:45

Extended soundtrack
No.	Title	Music	Singer(s)	Length
1.	"Mangal Rang"	A. R. Rahman	Arijit Singh, Shreya Ghoshal	4:37
2.	"Judi Jodi"	A. R. Rahman	Shreya Ghoshal	3:59
3.	"Shree Hanuman Chalisa" (Lyrics by Tulsidas)	A. R. Rahman	Sukhwinder Singh, Diljit Dosanjh, Mohit Chauhan, Shankar Mahadevan, Kailash Kher	6:58
4.	"Main Ram"	Prateek Walia	Sachet Tandon	3:42
5.	"Ram Raja Bhi Hain Aur Tapasvi Bhi Hain"	Kumar Vishwas	Jubin Nautiyal	5:06
6.	"O Ragho"	Shubham Shirule	Rishabh Raghuvanshi	3:00
7.	"Awadh Ke Ram Chale"	Arnab Dutta	Abhay Jodhpurkar	4:03
8.	"Ramayana (The Introduction Theme)"	Hans Zimmer, A. R. Rahman	Hiral Viradia; Arjun Chandy; Karthik Sekaran; Aparna Narayanan; Sireesha Bhagavatula; Sarath Santosh T S Sreekanth Hariharan	2:36
9.	"Ramayana Trailer Theme"	Hans Zimmer, A. R. Rahman	Instrumental	3:53
Total length:				33:58

=== Kannada ===
No.	Title	Lyrics	Music	Singer(s)	Length
1.	"Jai Jai Rama"	Karthik Saragur, Varadaraj Chikkaballapura	A. R. Rahman	Rakshita Suresh, Raghav Kaushik	5:20
2.	"Ravana Tandava"	Karthik Saragur	A. R. Rahman	Ravi Basrur, Omkar Patil, Jasraj Joshi, Aravind Srinivas, Narayanan Ravishankar, Shenbagaraj, Sarath Santosh	3:14
3.	"Sita's Aspiration"	Kumar Vishwas	A. R. Rahman	A. R. Ameen, Vaishali Samant, Rakshita Suresh, Antra Nandy	2:42
4.	"Jai Jai Ram" (Orchestral)	Instrumental	Hans Zimmer, A. R. Rahman	Instrumental	3:02
5.	"Rama Theme"	Instrumental	Hans Zimmer, A. R. Rahman	Instrumental	2:27
Total length:					16:45

Extended soundtrack
No.	Title	Lyrics	Music	Singer(s)	Length
1.	"Mangala Sangama"	Karthik Saragur	A. R. Rahman	Armaan Malik, Bela Shende	4:37
2.	"Janumada Jodi"	Karthik Saragur	A. R. Rahman	Pooja Vaidyanath	3:59
Total length:					8:36

=== Tamil ===
No.	Title	Lyrics	Music	Singer(s)	Length
1.	"Jai Jai Rama"	Karthik Netha	A. R. Rahman	Chinmayi Sripada, Haricharan	5:20
2.	"Ravana Tandavam"	Ilango Krishnan	A. R. Rahman	G. V. Prakash Kumar, Anirudh Ravichander, Omkar Patil, Jasraj Joshi, Aravind Srinivas, Narayanan Ravishankar, Shenbagaraj, Sarath Santosh	3:14
3.	"Sita's Aspiration"	Kumar Vishwas	A. R. Rahman	A. R. Ameen, Vaishali Samant, Rakshita Suresh, Antra Nandy	2:42
4.	"Jai Jai Ram" (Orchestral)	Instrumental	Hans Zimmer, A. R. Rahman	Instrumental	3:02
5.	"Rama Theme"	Instrumental	Hans Zimmer, A. R. Rahman	Instrumental	2:27
Total length:					16:45

Extended soundtrack
No.	Title	Lyrics	Music	Singer(s)	Length
1.	"Mangala Vanname"	Karthik Netha	A. R. Rahman	Abhay Jodhpurkar, Saindhavi	4:37
2.	"Pudhu Jodi"	Karthik Netha	A. R. Rahman	Heer	3:59
Total length:					8:36

=== Telugu ===
No.	Title	Lyrics	Music	Singer(s)	Length
1.	"Jai Jai Rama"	Rakendu Mouli	A. R. Rahman	Deepali Sahay, Raghav Kaushik	5:20
2.	"Ravana Tandavam"	Rakendu Mouli	A. R. Rahman	Devi Sri Prasad, Omkar Patil, Jasraj Joshi, Aravind Srinivas, Narayanan Ravishankar, Shenbagaraj, Sarath Santosh	3:14
3.	"Sita's Aspiration"	Kumar Vishwas	A. R. Rahman	A. R. Ameen, Vaishali Samant, Rakshita Suresh, Antra Nandy	2:42
4.	"Jai Jai Ram" (Orchestral)	Instrumental	Hans Zimmer, A. R. Rahman	Instrumental	3:02
5.	"Rama Theme"	Instrumental	Hans Zimmer, A. R. Rahman	Instrumental	2:27
Total length:					16:45

Extended soundtrack
No.	Title	Lyrics	Music	Singer(s)	Length
1.	"Rangulu Ranguley"	Rakendu Mouli	A. R. Rahman	Raghav Kaushik, Vaishali Samant	4:37
2.	"Jatha Goode"	Rakendu Mouli	A. R. Rahman	Sireesha Bhagavatula	3:59
Total length:					8:36

=== Malayalam ===
No.	Title	Lyrics	Music	Singer(s)	Length
1.	"Jai Jai Rama"	Vinayak Sasikumar	A. R. Rahman	Amritha Rajan, Haricharan	5:20
2.	"Ravana Tandavam"	Vinayak Sasikumar	A. R. Rahman	Yadu Krishnan, Omkar Patil, Jasraj Joshi, Aravind Srinivas, Narayanan Ravishankar, Shenbagaraj, Sarath Santosh	3:14
3.	"Sita's Aspiration"	Kumar Vishwas	A. R. Rahman	A. R. Ameen, Vaishali Samant, Rakshita Suresh, Antra Nandy	2:42
4.	"Jai Jai Ram" (Orchestral)	Instrumental	Hans Zimmer, A. R. Rahman	Instrumental	3:02
5.	"Rama Theme"	Instrumental	Hans Zimmer, A. R. Rahman	Instrumental	2:27
Total length:					16:45

Extended soundtrack
No.	Title	Lyrics	Music	Singer(s)	Length
1.	"Jeevitha Ragame"	Vinayak Sasikumar	A. R. Rahman	Naresh Iyer, Amritha Rajan	4:37
2.	"Manam Pole"	Vinayak Sasikumar	A. R. Rahman	Amrutha Suresh	3:59
Total length:					8:36

== Reception ==
Rahman and Zimmer's collaborative effort on the film's music drew mixed reactions. Shubhra Gupta of The Indian Express wrote "The background music is Hans Zimmer- AR Rahman jodi on full throttle". However, Sukanya Verma of Rediff described Zimmer's score as "middling" and Rahman's melodies being "stale" and felt like "rehashed riffs of his previous tunes". Anuj Kumar of The Hindu wrote "It is where the music comes in to express the inner turmoil. Having grown up on Ravindra Jain's music that brought Tulsidas into living rooms, the audio landscape created by A.R. Rahman and Vishwas feels oddly detached, functioning as a polished technical exercise rather than an emotional anchor. Hans Zimmer's presence is felt beneath the seat during the colossal battle sequences, but Ramayana is not about shaking the soul; it is about stirring it."

Zinia Bandyopadhyay of Firstpost wrote "The music is another area where I expected more. With Hans Zimmer and AR Rahman involved, expectations are naturally high. Yet, no particular song or musical theme really stays with you after the film. The songs often blend into the background score, rather than emerging as distinct musical moments. On the other hand, they do not interrupt the narrative or overwhelm the scenes. So, while the music is not a major problem, it is also not the memorable element one would have hoped for." Uday Bhatia of Mint wrote "A.R. Rahman supplies dull songs of devotion and, along with Hans Zimmer, fashions a stirring, old-fashioned symphonic score." In a positive note, Rahul Desai of The Hollywood Reporter India stated that, "the score of Hans Zimmer (in the rousing scenes) and A.R. Rahman (in the edgier ones) works overtime to do what the staging and actors cannot: provide a psyche beyond the spectacle."

Some social media users compared portions of the song "Mangal Rang" to Rahman's "Enna Solla Pogirai" from Kandukondain Kandukondain (2000) and "Kun Faya Kun" from Rockstar (2011), criticising alleged Sufi and qawwali themed influences in a traditional Indian mythological setting. The electronic treatment in the song "Ravana Tandav" was also criticised on social media. Rahman defended his creative process, saying: "We do so much work, filtration, ideation and iteration that there's no energy left to look at feedback. We just put it out because it's been tried and tested so much. My son keeps telling me, ‘This is what they said yesterday; now they're apologising. I say, 'Fine, I've done my work sincerely and hope people celebrate it.'"

== Personnel ==
Credits adapted from T-Series:

- Music composer, arranger, producer and programmer: Hans Zimmer, A. R. Rahman
- Guest composer: Prateek Walia (JAM8), Kumar Vishwas
- Music supervisors: A. R. Ameen, Hiral Viradia, Tanvi Maru
- Music curator: Tanvi Maru
- Additional music production: Sahil Vishwakarma, Gibson George
- Additional arrangement: Sahil Vishwakarma
- Additional programming: Shubham Bhat, Prashanth Venkat, Siddharth Narayanan, Nakul Abhyankar
- Sound design: Gibson George
- Head of technical services: Riyasdeen Riyan
- Dolby Atmos Music mixing supervisor: Riyasdeen Riyan, Hemaksh Kalsi
- Musician coordinators: R Samidurai, Abdul Haiyum

Musicians

- Santoor: Satyendra Solanki
- Flute: Adwait Kashikar
- Sitar: Ravi Chary, Asad Khan, Mehtab Ali Niazi
- Sarod: Rohan Prasanna
- Guitars: Shrey Gupta, R Prasanna, Keba Jeremiah
- Electric guitar: Roland Fernandes
- Indian slide guitar: Amritanshu Dutta
- Bass: Prashanth Venkat, Roland Fernandes
- Tabla: Akshay Jadhav, Sai Shravanam, Rupak Dhamankar
- Pakhwaj: Sai Shravanam
- Veena: Haritha Raj, Saipriya Viswanathan, Punya Srinivas
- Live rhythms and percussions: Dipesh Varma, Ratnadeep Jamsandekar
- Percussions: Sivamani, Sai Shravanam, Hari Prasadh T S, Karthik Vamsi, Ranjith, Sarvesh Karthik
- Indian percussions: Sai Shravanam, Dipesh Varma, Ratnadeep Jamsandekar, Vijay Jadhav, Tushar Shirsat, Pratik Tapase
- Additional vocals: Raghav Kaushik, Deepali Sahay, Omkar Patil, Jasraj Joshi, Aravind Srinivas, Narayanan Ravishankar, Shenbagaraj, Sarath Santosh, Ronkini Gupta, Parag Chhabra, Sudeep Jaipurwale, Romy, Vishwajeet Borwankar, Anmol Saxena
- Additional rhythm: Kalyan
- Rhythm arrangement: Kalyan, Suryansh

Choir

- Chorus arranger and conductor: Arjun Chandy, Gibson George
- Choir performers: Sugandh Shekar, Ishan Rojindar, Yadu Krishnan, Shridhar Ramesh, Sudharsan Hemaram, Aparna Harikumar, Sushmita Narasimhan, Nayansee Sharma, Padmaja Sreenivasan, Gayathry Rajiv, Vivek Naik, Rahul Chitnis, Santosh Bote, Sagar Lele, Karan Kagale, Janardan Dhatrak, Veena Joshi, Sonal Naik, Reshma Dhotre, Seema Lele, Mayuri Kudalkar, Ratna Parab, Neha Saxena, Sahil Vishwakarma, Pukhraj Sonkar, Aman Sharma, Shashank Pandey, Aniket Shukla, Rishabh Panchal, Parvathy Naveen, Gauri Singhal, Anupam Bhattacharya, Anushka Mahanta, Vivek Baretha

Orchestra

- Sunshine Orchestra and Chennai Strings Orchestra
  - Orchestra conductor: Prabakar
  - Session supervisor: Suryansh
- London Symphony Orchestra
  - Orchestra conductor: Gavin Greenaway
  - Orchestrators: Nipun Bhatnagar, Samarth Srinivasan
  - Librarian: Jill Streater
  - Score recordist: Geoff Foster
- Budapest Scoring Orchestra
  - Conductor: Peter Illeyni
  - Orchestra Indian representative: Balasubramanian G
  - Session producer: Bálint Sapszon
  - Librarian: Anna Sapszo, Kati Reti
  - Orchestrators: Sanjay RA, Balasubramanian G
  - Session supervisor: Pranav Parab

Recording studios

- Panchathan Record Inn, Chennai
  - Senior engineers: Suresh Permal, Karthik Sekaran
  - Assisting engineers: Sathish V Saravanan, Bharath Arjunan
  - Recording engineers: Sarath Santhosh, Sreekanth Hariharan, Suryansh
- Panchathan Record Inn, Mumbai
  - Senior engineer: Nitish R Kumar
  - Assisting engineers: Naval Chikhliya, Aditya Rana
  - Recording engineers: Dilshaad Shabbir Shaikh, Hiral Viradia
- AM Studios, Chennai
  - Recording engineers: Pradeep Menon, S Padmasharan
  - Studio engineers: S Sivakumar, Krishnan Subramanian, Aravind MS
- Café Musica, Chennai
  - Recording engineer: Vibin Sundar
- JAM8 Studios, Mumbai
  - Recording engineer: Subhashree Das, Aakash Mukharjee, Sahil Bhagat
  - Studio engineers: Aryan Sharma, Shaunak Joshi, Atharva Dudhane
- Rottenblier Studios, Budapest
  - Studio engineer: Viktor Szabó

Mixing studios

- New Edge Studios, Mumbai
  - Mixing engineer: Shadab Rayeen
  - Assistant engineer: Jazbaat, Sohamm, Suryansh
- Panchathan Record Inn, Chennai
  - Mixing engineer: Vinay Sridhar, Riyasdeen Riyan
- Resound India, Chennai
  - Mixing engineer: Sai Shravanam
- AIR Studios, London
  - Mixing engineer: Geoff Foster
- JAM8 Studios, Mumbai
  - Mixing engineer: Hemaksh Kalsi

Mastering studios

- Panchathan Record Inn, Chennai
  - Mastering engineer: Riyasdeen Riyan
- New Edge Studios, Mumbai
  - Mastering engineer: Shadab Rayeen
  - Assistant engineer: Jazbaat, Sohamm, Suryansh
- Resound India, Chennai
  - Mastering engineer: Sai Shravanam
- JAM8 Studios, Mumbai
  - Mastering engineer: Hemaksh Kalsi

Other personnel

- Arijit's vocals edited by: Arijit Singh
- Arijit's vocals recorded by: Ritvik Shah and Sukanto Singh
- Arijit’s co-ordinators: Azhar Shaikh and Ashish Biswal
- JAM8 music team: Jai Kothari, Pranav Parab, Hemaksh Kalsi
- JAM8 music intern: Sheldon Lobo
- JAM8 technical support: Aryan Sharma
- JAM8 audio post supervisor: Hemaksh Kalsi
- JAM8 production coordinator: Faris Khan
