= E-Clearance for Afterlife Remains =

Indian government portal

e-Clearance for Afterlife Remains
- Website type: Government services
- Available in: English
- Owner: Indian Government
- Key people: Mansukh Mandaviya
- Parent: Ministry of Health and Family Welfare
- Website: ecare.mohfw.gov.in
- Commercial: No
- Registration: Required
- Launched: October 2023
- Current status: Active

The e-Clearance for Afterlife Remains (e-CARe) is an Indian government portal. It was established to conduct clearance procedures electronically to ensure timely transportation of human remains across international borders, for public and their families in India. It is owned and operated by the International Health Division of the Ministry of Health.

It was established in October 2023, by Mansukh Mandaviya, minister of health at the Ministry of Health and Family Welfare in India.

== Implementation ==
Process

Notifications and updates regarding clearance status will be disseminated via email, SMS, and WhatsApp to relevant parties, including CIHD, the Nodal Officer and APHOs, consignees, and airlines. To minimize delays, officials will receive periodic updates during first 48 hours, allowing stakeholders to track the application status through the e-CARE portal using a registration number.

Delhi Airport will serve as the central hub for all international airports in India, approving the process within 48 hours. Under this system, airport health officers will grant clearance via email, working closely with transporting airlines. Required documents include the death certificate, embalming certificate, NOC from the Indian Embassy, and the canceled passport of the deceased. Delays often result from document clarifications and time zone differences. The portal will unify all stakeholders, provide continuous support, ensure process uniformity, and remove subjectivity associated with Airport Health Organisations.
