= Chikiri Chikiri =

- Official song cover

Single by A. R. Rahman and Balaji featuring Mohit Chauhan

from the album Peddi
- Released: 7 November 2025
- Recorded: 2025
- Studio: Panchathan Record Inn, Chennai
- Genre: Pop; folk; dance music
- Length: 4:33
- Label: T-Series
- Songwriter: Balaji
- Composer: A. R. Rahman

Peddi track listing
- 1. "Chikiri Chikiri"; 2. "Rai Rai Raa Raa"; 3. "Hellallallo"; 4. "Massa Massa"

Music video
- "Chikiri Chikiri" on YouTube

"Chikiri Chikiri" is a 2025 Indian Telugu-language song composed by A. R. Rahman, with lyrics written by Balaji, and sung by Mohit Chauhan, for the soundtrack album of the 2026 film Peddi. It was released on 7 November 2025 as the first single from the album, through T-Series. The peaked on the several charts including Billboard India Songs and UK Asian Music Chart.

== Background ==
The film music composed by A. R. Rahman, in his maiden collaboration with Ram Charan and Buchi Babu Sana.

== Composition and lyrics ==
The song lyrics written by Balaji. Buchi Babu Sana stated that he wanted A. R. Rahman to bring in the energy and soulfulness of song "Humma Humma" from Bombay (1995), also music composed by Rahman himself. The Telugu word "Chikiri" translates to lovely or beautiful woman, which refers to the women of Buchi Babu's village who inspired this song.

== Release ==
The first single was announced by makers on 5 November 2025, revealing the song's title. The first single, titled "Chikiri Chikiri" was released on 7 November 2025.

== Critical reception ==
The song "Chikiri Chikiri" has received positive critical and audience reception. Filmmaker Ram Gopal Varma was liked the song and he said, "that every craft in cinema "should be only to elevate the HERO." He felt Ram Charan appeared "raw, real, and explosive" in the song.

== Other versions ==
The song was also released in Hindi with lyrics written by Raqueeb Alam and sung by Mohit Chauhan, Tamil with lyrics written by Vivek and sung by A. R. Ameen, Malayalam with lyrics written by Siju Thuravoor and sung by Benny Dayal and Kannada with lyrics written by Varadaraj Chikkaballapura and sung by Sanjith Hegde.

== Impact ==
Ram Charan's hookstep in the music video went viral. Upon its release, the song received 200 million views across all languages of release. Following its release, it peaked at top #1 on Billboard India Songs and #22 on UK Asian Music Chart.

== Credits and personnel ==
Credits adapted from YouTube.

- A. R. Rahman – Music Composed
- Mohit Chauhan – Vocal
- Balaji – Lyrics
- Sarat Santhosh – Additional Vocals
- Prashanth Venkat – Music Supervisor
- Karthik Sekaran – Project Manager
- Kareem Kamalakar – Flute
- Saroja – Dilruba
- Manonmani – Sarangi
- Renin Raphael – Guitar
- Usija Nachiyaar – Veena
- Hariprasadh – Indian Percussion
- Sunshine Orchestra, Conducted By Jerry Vincent – Strings
- Kalyan, Kumaran Sivamani – Additional Rhythm Programming
- Santhosh Dhayanidhi, Prashanth Venkat – Additional Programmers
- Sarat Santhosh, Suryansh – Vocal Supervisors:
- Panchathan Record Inn, Chennai – Sound engineers
- Suresh Permal, Karthik Sekaran, – Senior Engineers
- Sathish V Saravanan, Bharath Arjunan, Sharan – Assistant Engineers
- Nitish R Kumar – Song Mixed and Mastered
- Riyasdeen Riyan – Dolby Music Mix and Technical Lead
- Samidurai R, Abdul Haiyum – Musicians Coordinators

== Charts ==
Chart performances for "Chikiri Chikiri"
Chart	Peak position
India Songs (Billboard)	1
UK Asian Music Chart (OCC)	22
