= GSTV =

Indian Gujarati-language TV news channel

- Country: India
- Broadcast area: Gujarat and India
- Headquarters: Ahmedabad

Programming
- Language(s): Gujarati
- Picture format: SD

Ownership
- Owner: Shreyarth Aaspas Ltd
- Key people: Shreyansh Shah, Managing Editor

History
- Launched: 9 December 2012

Links
- Webcast: www.gstv.in/live/
- Website: gstv.in

GSTV is a 24x7 Gujarati satellite news channel in India from the house of Gujarat Samachar. The channel was launched in 2012.

== History ==
GSTV was launched on 9 December 2012. It is the brainchild of the doyen of Gujarati media Shreyans Shah who ran the premier Gujarati newspaper Gujarat Samachar. This was the first channel in Gujarat to have an open studio. Today the Channel reaches about 50 lakh households in Gujarat. The Channel is accredited by various authorities of Govt of India and Gujarat Government.

== Programming ==
GSTV is a 24×7 news channel with regular bulletins. The channel airs panel discussions Lakshyavedh and The Real Debate in the evening.

=== BBC Partnership ===
In 2018, BBC World Service launched 'BBC Samachar' as part of an ongoing expansion drive in India. GSTV is the only Gujarati channel in such a partnership with BBC. 'BBC Samachar' is presented by Archana Pushpendra and Mihir Raval.

== Distribution ==
The satellite broadcast of the channel is currently done through G-SAT. Earlier the Channel was on IntelSat.

In addition, GSTV is present as a free-to-air channel on major DTH and cable platforms such as Airtel, Tata Play, Hathway, etc. In addition, the channel also provides news through its website GSTV.in.

=== Social Media and OTT ===
GSTV is present on major social media platforms like Facebook, Instagram and YouTube. The channel launched an OTT platform InTheSky.in in 2022.

== I&B Ministry Notice ==
In 2015, during a programme the channel took a swipe at an unnamed political leader holding an "esteemed office". The content was deemed objectionable the Channel was issued a show-cause notice by the Information & Broadcasting (I&B) Ministry. In its reply, the Channel stated that it believed that the issues raised in the programme were in the larger public interest.
