= Batwara 1947 =

2026 Indian film by Rajkumar Santoshi

- Theatrical release poster
- Directed by: Rajkumar Santoshi
- Screenplay by: Rajkumar Santoshi
- Dialogues by: Rajkumar Santoshi; Asghar Wajahat
- Story by: Asghar Wajahat; Rajkumar Santoshi
- Based on: Jis Lahore Nai Vekhya, O Jamya E Nai by Asghar Wajahat
- Produced by: Aamir Khan; Aparna Purohit
- Starring: Sunny Deol; Preity Zinta; Shabana Azmi; Karan Deol; Ali Fazal; Abhimanyu Singh; Khushi Hajare; Kanikka Kapur; Isha Sandhir
- Cinematography: Santosh Sivan
- Edited by: Shyam Salgaonkar
- Music by: A. R. Rahman
- Production company: Aamir Khan Productions
- Distributed by: PVR Inox Pictures
- Release date: 14 August 2026
- Running time: 145 minutes
- Country: India
- Language: Hindi
- Budget: ₹150 crore
- Box office: ₹49.24 crore

Batwara 1947 (transl. Partition 1947) is a 2026 Indian Hindi-language period drama film co-written and directed by Rajkumar Santoshi, and produced by Aamir Khan under the banner of Aamir Khan Productions. Set in Lahore against the backdrop of the 1947 Partition of British India and the division of Punjab, the film stars Sunny Deol, Preity Zinta, Shabana Azmi, Karan Deol, Ali Fazal, Abhimanyu Singh, Khushi Hajare, Kanikka Kapur, and Isha Sandhir. The film is based on Asghar Wajahat's drama Jis Lahore Nai Vekhya, O Jamya E Nai. It was Zinta's comeback film after an eight-year hiatus.

Principal photography began in February 2024, and was completed in October 2025. The cinematography is handled by Santosh Sivan. The soundtrack is composed by A. R. Rahman, with lyrics penned by Javed Akhtar.

Initially scheduled for release on 23 January 2025 and later postponed to 15 June 2025, Batwara 1947 was ultimately delayed due to ongoing post-production work and a few reshoots. It was theatrically released on 14 August 2026, coinciding with the Independence Day weekend. It received mixed reviews from critics, and was a box-office disaster.

== Plot ==
Set in the city of Lahore in Punjab region, Batwara 1947 is a historical tale of displacement and human connection, taking place amid the upheaval of the Partition of British India. The newly independent nations of India and Pakistan are immediately overwhelmed by a flood of uprooted and devastated refugees. After suffering through horrific conditions in refugee camps, a lucky few of the displaced people are being allotted houses that were deserted by their former owners who fled the country.

The story follows Sikander Mirza as he migrates with his Muslim family – his wife Hameeda, their son Javed, and daughter Tanvir – from Meerut in United Provinces, India to Lahore in West Punjab, Pakistan. After living for some time at a refugee camp, they are allocated a big haveli, whose Hindu owners have left for East Punjab in India, following the division of the Punjab province, due to partition. The tension intensifies when Sikander discovers an elderly haggard Punjabi Hindu woman still living in the haveli. She accuses Sikander and his family of trespassing. The old matriarch, known only as Mai, claims to be the rightful owner of her ancestral haveli. Sikander is determined to get rid of the old woman, but she defiantly refuses. This unexpected encounter sparks mounting tensions and intricate emotional conflicts as the characters navigate their transformed reality against the backdrop of one of the most turbulent chapters in Indian subcontinent history.

== Cast ==
- Sunny Deol as Sikander Mirza
- Preity Zinta as Hamida Mirza, Sikander's wife
- Shabana Azmi as Durgavati / Mai
- Karan Deol as Javed Mirza, Sikander and Hamida's son
- Ali Fazal as Habib Anwar
- Abhimanyu Singh as Yaqoob Khan
- Khushi Hajare as Tanvir Mirza / Tanno, Sikander and Hamida’s daughter
- Kanikka Kapur as Nishat Khan
- Isha Sandhir as Tabassum
- Hansdev Sharma as Kabban
- Pankaj Raina as Zafar
- Vishnu Sharma as Maulvi
- Khalid Siddiqui as Ratan Lal, Durgavati's son
- Rukhsar Rehman as Savitri, Ratan's wife
- Parminder Singh Kainth as Muhammad Shah
- Shivika Rishi as Shanti, Ratan and Savitri's daughter
- Ambika Nagwani
- Rajan Modi as Rashid Khan
- Chandan Dilawar as Mushtaq Khan
- Rajesh Kamboj
- Yana Badlani

== Production ==
=== Development ===
The film was originally titled Lahore 1947, but the historical drama film was renamed Batwara 1947 to avoid potential political controversies and geopolitical sensitivities amid strained relations between India and Pakistan.

Development of the film was announced in October 2023, when filmmaker Rajkumar Santoshi and actor Sunny Deol confirmed their reunion following their previous collaborations, including the films Ghayal (1990), Damini (1993), and Ghatak (1996). In February 2024, Aamir Khan officially came on board as producer under Aamir Khan Productions, marking his first collaboration with Deol. The film was conceived as Lahore 1947 and was later revealed to be an adaptation of Asghar Wajahat's acclaimed play Jis Lahore Nai Vekhya, O Jamya E Nai – a title that borrows an old Punjabi adage meaning that, "Experiencing Lahore is so fundamental to a fulfilling life that not seeing it is akin to not truly living or being born". It is set in the city of Lahore amid the division of Punjab during the Partition of British India in 1947. Santoshi wrote the screenplay, while Wajahat and Santoshi developed the story, with dialogues jointly written by them. Cinematographer Santosh Sivan, composer A. R. Rahman, and lyricist Javed Akhtar were also announced as part of the principal creative team.

On 9 June 2026, the film was officially retitled Batwara 1947 through a motion poster released by the makers. Along with the new title, the producers announced a theatrical release during the Independence Day weekend in August 2026. The title change was presented as part of the film's promotional campaign, replacing the working title that had been used since the project's announcement.

=== Casting ===
Sunny Deol was attached to the project from its announcement and was cast in the lead role of Sikander Mirza. Preity Zinta was cast opposite Deol as his wife, Hamida. Shabana Azmi joined the principal cast as Mai, the elderly Hindu woman at the centre of the story. Karan Deol was subsequently cast as Javed, the son of Sikander and Hamida. Aamir Khan said that Karan had tested for the role and had undergone workshops and rehearsals before filming. Ali Fazal joined the cast as Nasir Kazmi, while Abhimanyu Singh was cast as Yaqoob Pehalwan. Other members of the ensemble were subsequently announced, including Khushi Hajare, Kanikka Kapur and Isha Sandhir.

=== Filming ===
Principal photography for the film commenced in February 2024. Following the initial phases of production, the first schedule concluded in August 2024, after Sunny Deol completed an intense 70-day shoot.

In late 2025, producer Aamir Khan reviewed the first cut of the film and suggested several creative modifications. Consequently, director Rajkumar Santoshi and Deol returned to shoot newly envisioned sequences on location across Punjab. This additional 12-day reshoot schedule began on 10 October 2025, and overall filming for the project was officially completed by late October 2025.

=== Post-production ===
The film's post-production extended beyond its originally announced release schedule. It was initially scheduled for release on 23 January 2025 and was subsequently postponed to 15 June 2025. The delays were attributed to ongoing post-production work and additional reshoots. The later filming schedule incorporated changes to some sequences following suggestions from producer Aamir Khan. Deol resumed filming in Punjab in October 2025 for the newly incorporated material. The completed film was edited by Shyam Salgaonkar. Santosh Sivan served as cinematographer, while Resul Pookutty handled sound design. Production design was credited to Subrata Chakraborty and Amit Ray. The soundtrack was composed by A. R. Rahman, with lyrics by Javed Akhtar. The first cut of the film was also watched and approved by Dharmendra.

=== Marketing ===
The marketing campaign for Batwara 1947 included a nationwide promotional tour ahead of its theatrical release. In July 2026, the makers announced a 12-city tour during which members of the cast and crew would travel to different cities to interact with audiences and promote the film. The promotional tour included appearances by members of the principal cast, including Sunny Deol and Preity Zinta. In August 2026, Sunny Deol, Preity Zinta, and Karan Deol visited Jaipur, Ahmedabad, Lucknow, Patna, Chandigarh, Jalandhar, Amritsar, NCR, and Kolkata as part of the film's promotional activities. The cast's appearances in different locations were used to connect the film's Partition-era subject matter with audiences across India. Sunny Deol, Aamir Khan, and Preity Zinta also appeared on the hot seats of Kaun Banega Crorepati alongside host Amitabh Bachchan to promote Batwara 1947.

The campaign also incorporated the nostalgia surrounding the reunion of Sunny Deol and director Rajkumar Santoshi, who had previously collaborated on Ghayal, Damini and Ghatak. PVR INOX subsequently re-released Santoshi's Ghayal, Damini and Ghatak in cinemas ahead of Batwara 1947, as part of the promotional campaign surrounding the film. The promotional campaign was accompanied by the release of character posters, teasers, songs and the official trailer. The trailer and other promotional material emphasised the film's setting during the Partition of India and its themes of displacement, communal tension, family and humanity.

=== Distribution ===
Batwara 1947 was distributed in India by PVR INOX Pictures from 14 August 2026.

== Music ==
Batwara 1947

Soundtrack album by A. R. Rahman
- Released: 14 August 2026
- Recorded: 2024–2025
- Genres: Motion Picture Soundtrack; Hindi Film Music
- Length: 23:27
- Language: Hindi
- Label: Zee Music Company
- Producer: A. R. Rahman

A. R. Rahman chronology
Main Vaapas Aaunga (2026)	Batwara 1947 (2026)	Ramayana: Part 1 (2026)
External audio
- Batwara 1947 – Official Audio Jukebox on YouTube

Singles from Batwara 1947
- 1. "Kahan Chale Gaye Ho Ram" Released: 22 July 2026; 2. "Tabassum" Released: 7 August 2026; 3. "Chal Anjaane" Released: 14 August 2026; 4. "Dekhiye Jahaan Jaiye Kahin" Released: 14 August 2026; 5. "Maa Kahaan Jaa Rahi Hai" Released: 14 August 2026

The film's music is composed by A. R. Rahman, with the lyrics written by Javed Akhtar.

Track listing
No.	Title	Singer(s)	Length
1.	"Chal Anjaane"	Sarthak Kalyani, Heer	4:02
2.	"Tabassum"	Sonu Nigam, Heer	5:20
3.	"Kahaan Chale Gaye Ho Ram"	Anuradha Paudwal, Shaan	4:09
4.	"Dekhiye Jahaan Jaiye Kahin"	Javed Ali, Aanandi Joshi, Rabbani Mustafa Khan	4:57
5.	"Maa Kahaan Jaa Rahi Hai"	A. R. Rahman, Sarthak Kalyani	4:59
Total length:			23:27

== Release ==
=== Theatrical ===
The film was released worldwide on 14 August 2026, coinciding with the Independence Day weekend. Originally, the film was scheduled for release in January 2025 however it was delayed multiple times due to post production work and reshoots.

== Reception ==
=== Critical response ===
On the review aggregator website Rotten Tomatoes, 60% of 15 critics' reviews are positive, with an average rating of 5.90/10.

Devesh Verma of Filmfare gave the film 4 out of 5 stars and wrote, "Deol and Santoshi have always brought out something special in each other, and their reunion after several years makes you wonder why they stayed apart for so long". Anuj Kumar of The Hindu stated, "The Sunny-Shabana symphony and the film's core message remain deeply impactful. As for the bigger message, in 2001, Gadar changed the way popular Indian cinema approached the Partition; with Batwara 1947, Sunny flips that 25-year-old legacy on its head. Santoshi tunes his typical high-pitched directorial style to slow-burning, emotionally driven storytelling and, along the way, strips away Sunny's post-Gadar screaming archetype to mould him as a vulnerable Muslim migrant". Rishabh Suri of Hindustan Times wrote, "Azmi is absolutely remarkable as Mai. There is a quiet heartbreak in her performance. Then there is Sunny Deol, who has been the face of patriotism in Indian cinema for decades. His scenes with Shabana are among the film's most beautiful". Piya Roy of The Telegraph wrote, "The imagery of Batwara 1947 is poignant, powerful and intense, reminding audiences of the cruelty and immorality of religious bigotry and the beauty of unity, tolerance, mutual respect and peaceful coexistence." Saibal Chatterjee of NDTV gave the film 3 out of 5 stars and wrote, "Deol makes the most of the film's quieter moments and emotive scenes to add a kind of weight that is far more powerful than his fists of fury. Shabana Azmi delivers an absolute tour de force. She does in Batwara 1947 what Naseeruddin Shah did in Main Vaapas Aaunga".

Zinia Bandyopadhyay of Firstpost awarded the film 3 out of 5 stars and stated, "Deol shoulders much of the film with the familiar screen presence that has made him so recognizable over the years. But this isn't the Sunny Deol of Gadar or Border, and audiences expecting an endless stream of roaring dialogues and larger-than-life action sequences may be surprised". Sana Farzeen of India Today rated the film 2.5 stars out of 5 and wrote "The irony is that Batwara 1947 is terrific as a text. Adapted from the play Jis Lahore Nai Vekhya, O Jamya E Nai, the writing has ideas, the conversations have weight, and the central metaphor is powerful. But cinema needs emotional texture, lived-in relationships and performances that make you believe in the people on screen. It has all the right things to say but doesn't know how to, and that makes this potentially moving story feel surprisingly cold." Deepa Gahlot of Rediff rated the film 2.5 stars out of 5 and stated "The dramatic moments underlined by old-style background songs make the film look even more dated. Coming so soon after Main Vaapas Aaunga, also a Partition era tale with a message of compassion, the flaws in Batwara 1947 are even more grating." Dhaval Roy of The Times of India rated the film 2.5 stars out of 5 and wrote, "Though Batwara 1947 has its moments, its uneven treatment and overstretched narrative dilute the impact of its powerful message." Shubhra Gupta of The Indian Express rated the film 2 stars out of 5 and stated "The message is loud and clear: no religion is evil, only humans are; nafrat can be conquered through pyaar, siyasat se mazhab ko na milao; and above all, maanvata se bada koi dharam nahin. But they come as a listicle, instead of making you feel."

=== Box-office ===
Batwara 1947 has grossed a worldwide total of ₹48.88 crore (US$5.2 million) so far.
