= Khakee (film) =

2004 Indian film by Rajkumar Santoshi

- Theatrical release poster
- Directed by: Rajkumar Santoshi
- Written by: Rajkumar Santoshi; Shridhar Raghavan
- Produced by: Keshu Ramsay
- Starring: Amitabh Bachchan; Akshay Kumar; Ajay Devgn; Aishwarya Rai; Tusshar Kapoor
- Cinematography: K. V. Anand
- Edited by: Merzin Tavaria
- Music by: Ram Sampath
- Production company: DMS Films Private Limited
- Distributed by: Eros International
- Release date: 23 January 2004
- Running time: 180 minutes
- Country: India
- Language: Hindi
- Budget: ₹26 crore
- Box office: ₹45.4 crore

Khakee is a 2004 Indian Hindi-language action thriller film written and directed by Rajkumar Santoshi and produced by Keshu Ramsay. The film revolves around an Indian police team on a mission to escort an accused terrorist from a small town in Maharashtra to Mumbai. It stars an ensemble cast of Amitabh Bachchan, Akshay Kumar, Ajay Devgn, Aishwarya Rai and Tusshar Kapoor.

Khakee was released theatrically on 23 January 2004 to widespread critical acclaim with particular praise for its screenplay, execution, and the cast's performances. The film was the fifth highest-grossing film of 2004, grossing ₹45.4 crore worldwide in its lifetime run.

The film was remade in Telegu as Satyameva Jayate (2009).

== Plot ==
Dr. Iqbal Ansari is an ISI agent captured in connection with riots. As he is being transported to Mumbai, the police convoy is attacked, and Ansari is secured, but not before every officer on the convoy is killed. Deputy Inspector General of Police Shrikant Naidu, assembles a team of five police personnel to bring Ansari safely from Chandangarh to Mumbai. The team consists of a veteran and experienced DCP Anant Kumar Srivastava, morally corrupt Senior Inspector Shekhar Verma, a rookie Sub-Inspector Ashwin Gupte, and constables Kamlesh Sawant and Gajanan Mhatre.

A criminal, Yashwant Aangre, tracks the team. The team proceeds to Chandangarh and comes across school teacher Mahalakshmi, who informs them about suspected terrorists who stayed incognito in her school premises. Soon, along with Ansari and Mahalakshmi, they leave for Mumbai by road. Aangre distracts the team and tries to foil the mission repeatedly, but fails.

En route, the van breaks down, and the team halts at a secluded bungalow. Anant calls Naidu to apprise him of the events and asks him to send a police team. As the van is being repaired, Anant recalls Aangre, a corrupt and ruthless ex-cop or ex-inspector, who was suspended and imprisoned after Anant caught him killing five innocent men in a fake encounter during the bank robbery.

As the van is repaired, the team is attacked at the bungalow by Aangre and his men. Shekhar tries to surrender Ansari to Aangre, but Anant objects, with Ashwin pointing his gun at Shekhar. At this point, the plot turns when Ansari breaks down and tells them that the terrorists are there to kill him, not free him. He was a doctor in Chandangarh when a journalist Bhaskar Joshi informed him that the communal riots were engineered by minister Deodhar, who killed a few social workers who had compiled evidence that would've jailed him. Bhaskar had the file containing the evidence and wanted the post-mortem reports from Ansari to expose Deodhar but was killed by his cronies. When Ansari refused to cooperate with the wrongdoers, corrupt cops on Deodhar's payroll framed him as a terrorist. As he concludes his revelation, Aangre and his men enter the house, who thrashes Anant for his earlier actions, while Shekhar and Ashwin escape with Ansari. They cause an explosion and the team manages to escape, but Aangre manages to shoot Ansari, albeit not fatally. A phone call to Anant makes him realize that Naidu is a corrupt cop who is in league with Deodhar and Aangre.

The team desperately takes Ansari to the hospital at a nearby village. An exhausted Anant gives the others the option to leave the mission, but everyone stands by him. However local police arrive and try to take charge on Naidu and Deodhar's orders, but the SP, realizing what Anant and the team faced, mislead Naidu instead and assure them of assistance. Seeing no way out, Deodhar frames them through a press conference and angry villagers storm the hospital, but Anant, reprimands the villagers and convinces that only the courts will decide Ansari's fate if he is found guilty. The team soon plan to get away on an empty train to Mumbai with the recovering Ansari. Aangre's gang arrives, but the team has taken precautions. Kamlesh drives away from the station in the police van as a decoy. Shekhar takes control of the train, and the team boards it. Kamlesh abandons the van and runs to catch the moving train but is shot dead by Aangre.

Upon reaching Mumbai, the team is devastated as Ansari succumbs to his injuries and dies. They however, give him a proper burial and vow to clear his name. Deodhar tries to coax Anant to toe the line, but Anant refuses, who is then put under surveillance by cops on Naidu's payroll. The team finds the file through journalist Bhaskar's son. Shekhar and Mahalakshmi go to the general post office and recover the file, but Aangre ambushes them. Shekhar is lured into a stadium where it is revealed that Mahalakshmi is Aangre's girlfriend and was planted on the team by Aangre to track their location. Shekhar gets shot by Aangre's men, but not before he places a call to Anant stealthily by pressing speed dial, letting him know that Mahalakshmi is a double agent.

Following Shekhar's death, Anant and Ashwin now attack Naidu and make him spill the beans; they locate Aangre by following Mahalakshmi. In a shootout, Aangre uses Mahalakshmi as a shield, and she dies. Anant chases Aangre, there is a fight and Anant beats Aangre brutally with Shekhar's belt while Ashwin recovers the file, and an injured Aangre is arrested.

With compelling evidence from the file, the court convicts Aangre, Deodhar, and Naidu for life, much to the relief of Ansari's family, who is no longer branded a traitor and terrorist, for whom Anant promises to take care of Ansari's son. On route to jail, Aangre sees the bolts holding his handcuffs loose. He grabs a rifle and tries to escape, only to find the rifle empty. Ashwin shoots Aangre and shows him the screws of the bolts, indicating that this was a setup for an encounter and payback for the deaths of Kamlesh, Ansari, and Shekhar. He then calls the headquarters, informing them that Aangre has been fatally wounded while trying to escape from custody despite being warned. Aangre eventually succumbs to his wounds.

== Cast ==
- Amitabh Bachchan as DCP Anant Kumar Shrivastav
- Akshay Kumar as Senior Inspector Shekhar Verma
- Ajay Devgn as Yashwant Aangre
- Aishwarya Rai as Mahalakshmi
- Tusshar Kapoor as Sub Inspector Ashwin Gupte
- Atul Kulkarni as Dr. Iqbal Ansari
- Jaya Prada as Jaya Shrivastav
- Prakash Raj as Additional Commissioner Shrikant Naidu
- Sabyasachi Chakrabarty as Home Minister Deodhar
- D. Santosh as Head Constable Ganjanan Mhatre
- Kamlesh Sawant as Constable Kamlesh Sawant
- Tanuja as Ansari's mother
- Yusuf Hussain as Police Commissioner
- Prasanna Ketkar as Constable Ghorpade
- Ashwini Kalsekar as Kamlesh's wife
- Lara Dutta as an item dancer in the song Aisa Jadoo (special appearance)

== Production ==
=== Development ===
The film's co-writer Shridhar Raghavan, knew Santoshi, who wanted to make a cop film with Amitabh Bachchan, through Anjum Rajabali. During their meet, Raghavan narrated a script to Santoshi about cops, which he liked. Raghavan said: "We kept that as a base and started working afresh, collaborating, writing, rewriting." They created a character for Bachchan, inspired by Zanjeer in the "21st century situation".

Khakee was made with an estimated production budget of ₹25.77 crore (US$2.8 million) making it one of the most expensive Hindi films at that point.

=== Casting ===
Amitabh Bachchan was the first actor to be cast in the film. Akshaye Khanna was offered the role of role of Sub-Inspector Ashwin Gupte, while Ajay Devgn was offered the role of Senior Inspector Shekhar Verma. While Khanna declined, Devgn instead opted to play the villain, Yashwant Aangre, making it his second film as an antagonist after Deewangee (2002). Later, Tusshar Kapoor was signed for the role of Ashwin Gupte. Lara Dutta was also signed for an item number "Aisa Jadoo". After several actresses rejected, the role of Mahalakshmi, Aishwarya Rai was finalized for the part. Akshay Kumar, who was signed to play Shekhar Verma, worked with Amitabh Bachchan for the third time after Ek Rishtaa: The Bond of Love (2001) and Aankhen (2002).

=== Filming ===
The film was shot in various parts of Maharashtra, including Mumbai and Nashik. The fictional city of "Nairoli" shown in the film is actually the city of Apta near Panvel. The railway station of Apta was rechristened as Nairoli for the scene featuring the shoot-out at the station. Ram Sampath composed the music for the film, with lyrics by Sameer.

While filming in Nashik, Aishwarya Rai was hit by an out-of-control jeep and was thrown back into some bushes by the side of the road. She and Tusshar Kapoor were rehearsing a scene where the jeep was supposed to come and stop 20 feet away from them. However, the jeep driver lost control and did not brake. She suffered a fracture on her left foot and some bruises.

== Reception ==
=== Critical response ===
Khakee was met with critical acclaim, including for the performances of the lead actors. On the review aggregator website Rotten Tomatoes, 100% of 7 critics' reviews are positive, with an average rating of 8.3/10. The Hindu daily mentioned; "It's the director's show all the way. Khakee is great evidence of what smart writing can do to a film - the duo of Rajkumar Santoshi and Shridhar Raghavan, deserve all the credit for packing the punches the film delivers. A little pace is lost in the second half because of the dialogues, song and dance, but thanks to high production values and charismatic star appeal, you really don't feel the length - 2 hours and 54 minutes. An aging Amitabh Bachchan is the first rate with his trademark delivery. Akshay Kumar provides the comic relief with his 'I'm cool' flirtatious attempts to woo Aishwarya [Rai] and Tusshar [Kapoor] plays the foil to his seniors - a neat essay". Mayank Shekhar of Mid-Day wrote "The reason Khakee will linger in public memory for a good while is quite simply Bachchan — back to basics," and concluded, "Khakee is proof that the ‘angry young man’ only got better, if not younger as well! And that's more than a reason to recommend this film."

Sukanya Verma from Rediff said; "What I also like about Khakee is that every actor, big or small (in terms of footage), good or bad (in terms of character), has that one defining moment on screen. Khakee is a smart film. It makes you think. It keeps you at the edge of your seat. It gives you your money's worth. What more do you want. Bollywood Hungama gave the film four stars and explained; "One wouldn't call Khakee the best script [Rajkumar] Santoshi has tackled, but it certainly would rank amongst the best. Another aspect that enhances the film is the dialogues (Rajkumar Santoshi), which will be met with a thunderous applause at various junctures of the film. Santoshi has a knack for extracting wonderful performances from the cast. Amitabh Bachchan delivers one of the best performances of his career. He has some of the toughest scenes in the film. In fact, a lesser actor would've failed to do justice to the role. But Bachchan's expressions, voice and movement bring the character to life. Akshay Kumar is fantastic. Ajay Devgn adds yet another feather in his cap with a performance that could've been essayed only by a master performer. Aishwarya Rai gets a role to prove her talent, and she more than lives up to the expectations. Tusshar may not have many lines to deliver, but his presence and expressions register a strong impact".

Derek Elley from Variety magazine stated; "The testosterone's so high you can almost put a match to it in Khakee, a twist-filled, often very violent drama centered on some cops escorting a terrorist cross-country to Mumbai. Powerhouse casting, and equally powerhouse direction by Rajkumar Santoshi, makes this an above-average example of mainstream Bollywood thrillers, sans any stylistic flourishes. Given its paucity of musical numbers and romance, this one could have a career on ancillary among general action buffs".

=== Box office ===
Khakee had a final worldwide gross of ₹49.89 crore (US$5.3 million) including ₹37.73 crore (US$4.0 million) in India and ₹12.16 crore (US$1.3 million) in abroad. The nett revenue of the film was ₹31.09 crore (US$3.3 million). It was declared an 'Average' by Box Office India. According to collection, Khakee was the 5th highest-grossing Bollywood film of 2004 behind Veer-Zaara, Main Hoon Na, Dhoom and Mujhse Shaadi Karogi.

== Accolades ==
=== 50th Filmfare Awards ===
Nominated

- Best Director – Rajkumar Santoshi
- Best Actor – Amitabh Bachchan
- Best Supporting Actor – Akshay Kumar
- Best Villain – Ajay Devgn

=== 6th IIFA Awards ===
Nominated

- Best Performance In A Negative Role – Ajay Devgn

=== Zee Cine Awards ===
Nominated

- Best Screenplay - Rajkumar Santoshi, Shridhar Raghavan
- Best Story - Shridhar Raghavan
- Best Dialogue - Rajkumar Santoshi
- Best Actor – Amitabh Bachchan
- Best Actor in a Supporting Role – Akshay Kumar
- Best Music Director - Ram Sampath
- Best Playback Singer (Male) - Arnab Chakravorty
- Best Playback Singer (Female) - Sunidhi Chauhan
- Best Action - Tinnu Verma
- Best Choreography - Ganesh Acharya
- Best Art Direction - Nitin Chandrakant Desai

== Soundtrack ==
Khakee

Soundtrack album by Ram Sampath
- Released: 17 October 2003
- Genre: Feature film soundtrack
- Label: T-Series

The music is composed by Ram Sampath. Lyrics are penned by Sameer. Rajkumar Santoshi wanted A. R. Rahman to compose the music for the film; but he did not sign the project due to other commitments. Hence Sampath was selected after an audition. According to the Indian trade website Box Office India, with around 10 lakh units sold, this film's soundtrack album was the year's fourteenth highest-selling.

=== Track listing ===
All lyrics are written by Sameer.

No.	Title	Singer(s)	Length
1.	"Aisa Jadoo"	Sunidhi Chauhan	3:23
2.	"Dil Dooba"	Sonu Nigam, Shreya Ghoshal	3:50
3.	"Mere Maula"	Richa Sharma, Kailash Kher	4:50
4.	"Uppar Wale"	Sonu Nigam, Sukhwinder Singh, Kunal Ganjawala	4:57
5.	"Wada Raha" (I)	Arnab Chakrabarty, Shreya Ghoshal	4:41
6.	"Wada Raha" (II)	Udit Narayan, Shreya Ghoshal	4:41
7.	"Wada Raha" (Sad)	Sonu Nigam	5:59
8.	"Teri Baahon Mein Hum"	Sonu Nigam, Shreya Ghoshal	5:22
9.	"Aisa Jadoo" (Remix)	Sunidhi Chauhan	5:19
10.	"Dil Dooba" (Remix)	Sonu Nigam, Shreya Ghoshal	4:17
