= Rajkumar Santoshi =

Indian filmmaker (born 1956)

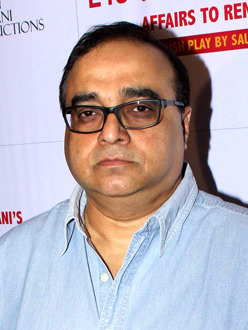
- Santoshi in 2015
- Born: 17 July 1956 (age 70)
- Occupations: Film director; screenwriter; producer
- Years active: 1982–present
- Notable work: Ghayal; Damini; Andaz Apna Apna; Barsaat; Ghatak; The Legend of Bhagat Singh; Batwara 1947
- Spouse: Manila Santoshi
- Children: 2
- Father: P. L. Santoshi

Rajkumar Santoshi (born 17 July 1956) is an Indian film director, screenwriter and producer, who works in Hindi cinema. A recipient of several accolades including three National Film Awards and six Filmfare Awards, he made his directorial debut with the action drama Ghayal (1990), starring Sunny Deol, Meenakshi Sheshadri and Amrish Puri. The film emerged as a blockbuster and critical success, making Santoshi a household name in the industry. The film also won him the National Film Award for Best Popular Film Providing Wholesome Entertainment as well as his first Filmfare Award for Best Director.

Santoshi's next film, the universally acclaimed social drama Damini (1993), which again starred Deol, Sheshadri and Puri, also emerged as a blockbuster. It is widely considered the best movie made by Santoshi, garnering him the Filmfare Award for Best Screenplay and his second consecutive Filmfare Award for Best Director. During this period, Santoshi also received praise for directing the comedy Andaz Apna Apna (1994) starring Aamir Khan and Salman Khan together, which despite being a box-office Semi-hit has attained cult status over the years. Later, he directed the successful action romance film Barsaat (1995), which marked the film debut of Bobby Deol and Twinkle Khanna. His next action drama Ghatak (1996), again emerged as a commercial blockbuster and critical success. Both Andaz Apna Apna and Ghatak earned him nominations for the Filmfare Award for Best Director.

Although his next films China Gate (1998) and 2000 action thriller Pukar, were not commercially successful; for later, his work was appreciated and he won the Nargis Dutt Award for Best Feature Film on National Integration for it. He followed it by directing two moderate commercial successes—the biopic The Legend of Bhagat Singh (2002) and the action thriller Khakee (2004) — both of which earned him nominations for the Filmfare Award for Best Director. His highest-grossing film of that decade came in 2009 with the romantic comedy Ajab Prem Ki Ghazab Kahani starring Ranbir Kapoor and Katrina Kaif, which grossed ₹1.2 billion (US$13 million) worldwide and was declared a commercial success at box-office.

== Early life ==
Rajkumar Santoshi was born on 17 July 1956 in Madras to P. L. Santoshi and his second wife. His father, originally surnamed Shrivastav and a native of Jabalpur, adopted 'Santoshi' as a pen name. His mother was of Tamil origin. His father worked as a film producer, director, screenwriter, lyricist, and occasional actor from the 1940s to the 1960s.

Santoshi spent his early childhood in Madras before moving to Bombay at the age of five, when his father returned there after a brief period working in Tamil cinema. He has two half-siblings from his father's first marriage.

In the later years of his father's life, the family faced financial difficulties as his career declined. Santoshi left his studies after Class XI and began assisting his father in filmmaking. Following his father's death in 1978 due to kidney failure, he became the primary earning member of the family, supporting his mother, grandmother, and younger sisters.

== Career ==
=== Early days and widespread success (1982–1996) ===
Santoshi started his career in 1982 as an assistant director on Govind Nihalani on the coming-of-age film Vijeta (1982) and the crime drama Ardh Satya (1983).

Santoshi made his directorial debut with the action drama Ghayal (1990), starring Sunny Deol and Meenakshi Seshadri in lead roles. The film tells the story of a person in search of his missing brother and the events that follow. It emerged as a blockbuster hit and a critical success, ranking as the second highest-grossing Hindi film of the year. Ghayal earned Santoshi his first Filmfare Award for Best Director, the Filmfare Award for Best Story, and the National Film Award for Best Popular Film Providing Wholesome Entertainment.

Santoshi followed it up with was the crime drama thriller Damini (1993), which dealt with themes considered bold at the time, such as the status of women in our society and the perspective of people towards women. The film starred Seshadri in the lead role, alongside Deol, Rishi Kapoor and Amrish Puri. It opened to universal acclaim, with widespread praise for its storyline, execution and theme. Damini also emerged as a blockbuster at the box-office and earned Santoshi his second consecutive Filmfare Award for Best Director, after Ghayal, thus becoming the only director to have won the award for his first two films. The film is now considered a cult feminist film and important for portraying women empowerment in cinema. The pathbreaking film was praised for breaking social taboos and handling the subject of rape with sensitivity; a rarity in Bollywood at the time.

After making two back-to-back serious films, Santoshi decided to make a light film. He then wrote and directed the comedy Andaz Apna Apna (1994), starring an ensemble cast of Aamir Khan, Salman Khan, Raveena Tandon, Karisma Kapoor, Paresh Rawal (in a dual role) and Shakti Kapoor in lead roles. The film received critical acclaim upon release but emerged as a commercial failure at the box-office. It earned Santoshi his third nomination for the Filmfare Award for Best Director. However over the years, it is considered a cult classic comedy, with its lexicon having become a part of everyday and ordinary language.

Santoshi then went on to make the action romance Barsaat (1995), which marked the debut of actors Bobby Deol and Twinkle Khanna. The film emerged as a big commercial success at the box-office, ranking as the fourth highest-grossing Hindi film of the year.

The following year, Santoshi wrote and directed the action drama Ghatak (1996), marking his third collaboration with Deol, Sheshadri, and Puri. The film received highly positive reviews from critics upon release, and emerged as a blockbuster at the box-office. It earned Santoshi the Filmfare Award for Best Screenplay, in addition to his fourth nomination for the Filmfare Award for Best Director.

=== Other projects (1998–2005) ===
His next venture was the action film China Gate (1998), inspired from Akira Kurosawa's epic drama Seven Samurai (1954). It follows the story of a village that hire a group of veterans to combat bandits who terrorise them. The film received mixed-to-negative reviews from critics upon release, with criticism for its story, screenplay and execution, and emerged as an average commercial success at the box-office, ranking as the tenth highest-grossing Hindi film of the year. However, it won Santoshi the Filmfare Award for Best Dialogue.

Santoshi began the new millennium with writing and directing another action thriller Pukar (2000) starring Anil Kapoor and Madhuri Dixit in lead roles. The film tells the story of a notorious terrorist who manipulates an Indian army major's jilted lover into helping him obtain a classified military code. The film received mixed-to-positive reviews from critics upon release and emerged as a below average grosser at the box-office. Nonetheless, it won Santoshi the Nargis Dutt Award for Best Feature Film on National Integration.

He followed it up with the social drama Lajja (2001), which told the story of four Indian women belonging to different strata of society. The film dealt with issues like gender inequality and the status of women in our society. The film starred an ensemble cast of Manisha Koirala, Madhuri Dixit, Rekha, Mahima Chaudhary, Anil Kapoor, Ajay Devgn, Jackie Shroff and Danny Denzongpa in lead roles. Lajja opened to mixed reviews from critics upon release, with criticism for Santoshi's story and screenplay. It emerged as a commercial failure at the Indian box-office, but was successful in overseas markets.

His next venture was The Legend of Bhagat Singh (2002), a biopic on the freedom fighter Bhagat Singh, portrayed by Devgn. The film opened to positive reviews upon release, with praise for its direction, story and screenplay. It released alongside another film based on Bhagat, 23 March 1931: Shaheed, which featured Bobby Deol as the revolutionary. Despite hype prior to release, the film emerged as a commercial failure at the box-office. The film's failure was attributed to its release on the same day as 23rd March 1931: Shaheed, with "the two Bhagats eating into each other's business". It, however, won Santoshi the National Film Award for Best Feature Film in Hindi. Since its release, The Legend of Bhagat Singh has been considered one of Santoshi's best works. In 2016, the film was included in Hindustan Times's list of "Bollywood's Top 5 Biopics".

Santoshi wrote and directed the ensemble neo-noir crime thriller Khakee (2004), starring Amitabh Bachchan, Akshay Kumar, Devgn, Aishwarya Rai and Tusshar Kapoor in lead roles. The film told the story of a group of cops who get embroiled in a mystery surrounding a terrorist attack. It opened to positive acclaim upon release, with Derek Elley of Variety writing: "Powerhouse casting, and equally powerhouse direction by Rajkumar Santoshi, makes this an above-average example of mainstream Bollywood thrillers." The film emerged as an average success at the box-office, ranking as the fifth highest-grossing Hindi film of the year. Khakee reiterated Santoshi as one of Bollywood's most sought-after directors, and earned him his fifth nomination for the Filmfare Award for Best Director.

=== Setbacks and resurgence (2006–2009) ===
His next venture was the action thriller family drama Family – Ties of Blood (2006) starring Bachchan, Kumar and Bhumika Chawla in lead roles. The film opened to negative reviews from critics upon release, and emerged as a commercial disaster at the box-office.

He next wrote and directed the social action drama Halla Bol (2008) starring Devgn, Vidya Balan and Pankaj Kapur in lead roles. The film was based on the life of activist Safdar Hashmi, who was killed by political rivals while performing in a street play (by the name of Halla Bol) in 1989. It was shot in 75 days in over 65 locations. Halla Bol was panned by critics, with Khalid Mohamed calling it "downright awful" [..] "packed with mind-benders galore." The film emerged as his second consecutive commercial disaster at the box-office.

Santoshi's career prospects improved when he wrote and directed the romantic comedy Ajab Prem Ki Ghazab Kahani (2009) starring Ranbir Kapoor and Katrina Kaif in lead roles. The film opened to positive reviews from critics upon release, with particular praise for its direction, story, screenplay, dialogues. It emerged as a Semi-Hit at the box-office, grossing ₹103.21 crore (US$12.4 million) worldwide, ranking as the third highest-grossing Hindi film of the year.

=== Intermittent work (2010–present) ===
After a 4-year hiatus, Santoshi made a comeback with the action comedy Phata Poster Nikhla Hero (2013) starring Shahid Kapoor and Ileana D'Cruz in lead roles. The film received mixed-to-positive reviews from critics upon release and emerged as an average grosser at the box-office. After another 10-year hiatus, Santoshi made a comeback in 2023 with two diverse ventures – the historical Gandhi Godse – Ek Yudh and the romantic comedy Bad Boy. Both the films opened to mixed-to-negative reviews upon release, and emerged as commercial disasters at the box-office.

Since 2024, he is directing an ambitious big budget period drama film, Batwara 1947 starring Sunny Deol, Preity Zinta and Shabana Azmi. The film is produced by Aamir Khan.

He will next direct the upcoming film Jaat 2, starring Sunny Deol. Its shooting will begin in late 2026 and it will be released in 2027.

== Personal life ==
Santoshi currently lives with his wife Manila and children; Ram and Tanisha.

== Filmography ==
=== Films ===
Year	Title	Director	Screenwriter	Producer
1990	Ghayal	Yes	Yes	No
1993	Damini	Yes	Yes	No
1994	Andaz Apna Apna	Yes	Yes	No
1995	Barsaat	Yes	Yes	No
1996	Ghatak	Yes	Yes	Yes
1998	China Gate	Yes	Yes	Yes
1998	Vinashak	No	Yes	No
1998	Doli Saja Ke Rakhna	No	No	Co-producer
1999	Jaanam Samjha Karo	No	Yes	Co-producer
2000	Pukar	Yes	Yes	No
2001	Lajja	Yes	Yes	Yes
2002	Dil Hai Tumhaara	No	Yes	No
2002	The Legend of Bhagat Singh	Yes	Yes	No
2004	Khakee	Yes	Yes	No
2006	Family	Yes	Yes	No
2008	Halla Bol	Yes	Yes	No
2009	Ajab Prem Ki Ghazab Kahani	Yes	Yes	No
2013	Phata Poster Nikhla Hero	Yes	Yes	No
2023	Gandhi Godse – Ek Yudh	Yes	Yes	No
2023	Bad Boy	Yes	No	No
2026	Batwara 1947	Yes	Yes	No

==== Assistant director ====
- Vijeta (1982)
- Ardh Satya (1983)
- Party (1984)
- Aghaat (1985)

==== Acting credits ====
Year	Title	Role	Notes
1996	Halo	Sasha's father	
2009	Ajab Prem Ki Ghazab Kahani	Passer-by	Uncredited cameo

== Awards and nominations ==
List of award and nominations received by Rajkumar Santoshi
Year	Title	Ceremony	Category	Result	Ref.
1991	Ghayal	National Film Awards	Best Popular Film Providing Wholesome Entertainment	Won	
1991	Ghayal	Filmfare Awards	Best Director	Won	
1991	Ghayal	Filmfare Awards	Best Story	Won	
1994	Damini	Filmfare Awards	Best Director	Won	
1994	Damini	Filmfare Awards	Best Film	Nominated	
1995	Andaz Apna Apna	Filmfare Awards	Best Director	Nominated	
1997	Ghatak	Filmfare Awards	Best Director	Nominated	
1997	Ghatak	Filmfare Awards	Best Screenplay	Won	
1999	China Gate	Filmfare Awards	Best Dialogue	Won	
2001	Pukar	National Film Awards	Nargis Dutt Award for Best Feature Film on National Integration	Won	
2003	The Legend of Bhagat Singh	National Film Awards	Best Feature Film in Hindi	Won	
2003	The Legend of Bhagat Singh	Filmfare Awards	Best Film (Critics)	Won	
2003	The Legend of Bhagat Singh	Filmfare Awards	Best Film	Nominated	
2003	The Legend of Bhagat Singh	Filmfare Awards	Best Director	Nominated	
2005	Khakee	Filmfare Awards	Best Director	Nominated	
2005	Khakee	Zee Cine Awards	Best Screenplay	Nominated	
2005	Khakee	Zee Cine Awards	Best Dialogue	Nominated	
2009	Ajab Prem Ki Ghazab Kahani	Stardust Awards	Dream Director	Nominated	
2009	Ajab Prem Ki Ghazab Kahani	Producers Guild Film Awards	Best Dialogue	Nominated	
