= Bobby Deol filmography =

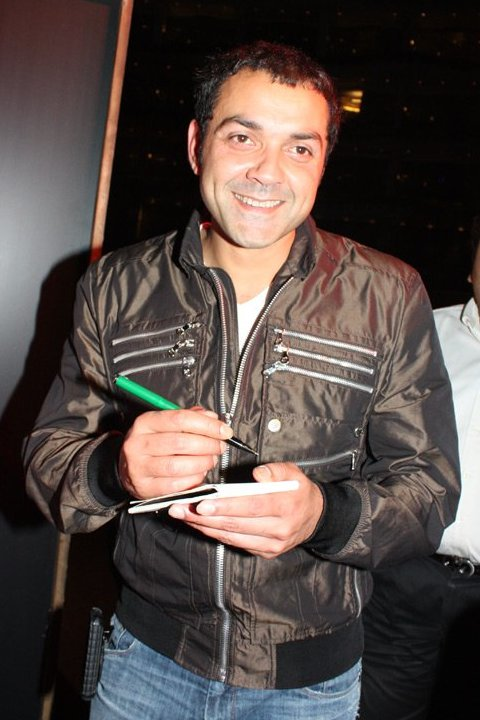
Deol in 2008

Bobby Deol is an Indian actor. After appearing as a child artist in Dharam Veer (1977), Deol had his first lead role in the superhit romance Barsaat (1995) that won him the Filmfare Award for Best Male Debut. He established himself as a lead with the top-grossing films Gupt (1997), Soldier (1998), Badal (2000), Bichhoo (2000), Ajnabee (2001), and Humraaz (2002). It was followed by a brief career downturn, during which his only rarely successful films include multi starrers like Apne (2007), Yamla Pagla Deewana (2011), Race 3 (2018) and Housefull 4 (2019). He reinforced his critical success with acclaimed performances in digital ventures Class of '83 (2020), Aashram (2020–present), and had a supporting role in the top-grossing action film Animal (2023) and Alpha (2026).

== Film ==
Year	Title	Role	Notes
1977	Dharam Veer	Young Dharam	Child artist
1995	Barsaat	Badal	
1997	Gupt: The Hidden Truth	Sahil Sinha	
1997	Aur Pyaar Ho Gaya	Bobby Oberoi	
1998	Kareeb	Birju Kumar	
1998	Soldier	Vicky / Raju Malhotra	
1999	Dillagi	Rajvir "Rocky" Singh	
2000	Badal	Raja / Badal	
2000	Hum To Mohabbat Karega	Rajiv Bhatnagar	
2000	Bichhoo	Jeeva Khandelwal	
2001	Aashiq	Chander Kapoor	
2001	Ajnabee	Raj Malhotra	
2002	Kranti	ACP Abhay Pratap Singh	
2002	23rd March 1931: Shaheed	Bhagat Singh	
2002	Humraaz	Raj Singhania	
2002	Chor Machaaye Shor	Shyam Singh / Inspector Ram Singh	
2004	Kismat	Tony	
2004	Bardaasht	Aditya Srivastava	
2004	Ab Tumhare Hawale Watan Saathiyo	Kunaljeet Singh / Vikramjeet Singh	
2005	Jurm	Avinash Malhotra	
2005	Tango Charlie	Tarun Chauhan (Tango Charlie)	
2005	Barsaat	Aarav Kapoor	
2005	Dosti: Friends Forever	Karan Thapar	
2005	Nalaik	Himself	Punjabi film; cameo
2006	Humko Tumse Pyaar Hai	Raj Malhotra	
2006	Alag	Himself	Cameo
2007	Shakalaka Boom Boom	Ayan Joshi	
2007	Jhoom Barabar Jhoom	Satvinder "Steve" Singh	
2007	Apne	Karan Singh Choudhary	
2007	Naqaab	Karan Oberoi / Rohit Shroff	
2007	Om Shanti Om	Himself	Cameo
2007	Nanhe Jaisalmer	Himself	
2008	Chamku	Chandrama "Chamku" Singh	
2008	Heroes	Captain Dhananjay Shergill	
2008	Dostana	Abhimanyu "Abhi" Singh	
2009	Ek: The Power Of One	Nandkumar Sharma "Nandu"	
2009	Vaada Raha	Dr. Duke Chawla	
2010	Help	Vic	
2011	Yamla Pagla Deewana	Gajodhar Singh / Karamvir Singh Dhillon	
2011	Thank You	Raj Malhotra	
2012	Players	Ronnie Grewal	
2013	Yamla Pagla Deewana 2	Gajodhar Singh / Prem "Q" Oberoi	
2017	Poster Boys	Vinay Kumar Sharma	
2018	Race 3	Yash Singh	
2018	Yamla Pagla Deewana: Phir Se	Kalaa / Kalia	
2019	Housefull 4	Dharamputra Singh / Max Sinha	
2020	Class of '83	ADGP Vijay Singh	
2022	Love Hostel	Viraj Singh Dagar	
2023	Animal	Abrar Haque	
2024	Kanguva	Udhiran	Tamil film
2025	Daaku Maharaaj	Balwanth Singh Thakur	Telugu film
2025	Housefull 5	Jalal Dobriyal aka. Real Jolly	Cameo
2025	Hari Hara Veera Mallu	Aurangzeb	Telugu film
2025	War 2	Fateh Singh Lakhawat	Cameo
2025	Bandar	Samar Mehra	Monkey in a Cage at TIFF
2025	Agent Ching Attacks	Professor White Noise	Short film
2026	Alpha	Fateh Singh Lakhawat / Zarrar Khan	
2026	Jana Nayagan	John Himmler / ACP Amrish Poojari	Tamil film

== Television ==
Key
†	Denotes television productions that have not yet been released

Year	Title	Role	Notes
2020–2025	Aashram	Kashipur Waale Baba Nirala / Monty Singh	MX Player
2022	Fabulous Lives of Bollywood Wives	Himself	Reality show
2025	The Ba***ds of Bollywood	Ajay Talwar	Netflix
2026	Teen Kauwe †	TBA	Amazon Prime Video series
