= Yamla Pagla Deewana (film series) =

Indian comedy film series

Yamla Pagla Deewana series
- Directed by: YPD: Samir Karnik; YPD 2: Sangeeth Sivan; YPD - Phir Se: Navaniat Singh
- Screenplay by: YPD, YPD 2: Jasvinder Bath; YPD - Phir Se: Dheeraj Rattan
- Dialogues by: YPD,YPD 2: Jasvinder Bath; YPD - Phir Se: Bunty Rathore
- Story by: YPD: Jasvinder Bath; YPD 2: Lynda Deol; YPD - Phir Se: Dheeraj Rattan
- Produced by: YPD: Nitin Manmohan; Samir Karnik; YPD 2: Dharmendra; YPD - Phir Se: Kamayani Punia Sharma; Aarushi Malhotra
- Starring: YPD, YPD 2, YPD - Phir Se: Dharmendra; Sunny Deol; Bobby Deol; YPD: Kulraj Randhawa; YPD 2: Kristina Akheeva; Neha Sharma; Annu Kapoor; YPD - Phir Se: Kriti Kharbanda; Binnu Dhillon; YPD, YPD 2: Anupam Kher; Johnny Lever
- Cinematography: Kabir Lal; Binod Pradhan (YPD); Neha Parti (YPD 2); Jitan Harmeet Singh (YPD - Phir Se)
- Edited by: Mukesh Thakur (YPD); Chirag Jain (YPD 2); Manish More (YPD - Phir Se)
- Music by: Songs: Laxmikant–Pyarelal; Anu Malik; Rhythm Dhol Bass; Nouman Javaid; Sandesh Shandilya; Rahul Seth (YPD); Sharib-Toshi; Sachin Gupta (YPD 2); Sanjeev-Darshan; Sachet–Parampara; Vishal Mishra; D Soldierz (YPD - Phir Se); Score: Sanjoy Chowdhury (YPD); Raju Singh (YPD 2, YPD - Phir Se)
- Production companies: One Up Entertainment; Top Angle Productions (YPD); Sunny Sounds Pvt. Ltd. (YPD 2, YPD - Phir Se); Intercut Entertainment; Pen India Limited (YPD - Phir Se)
- Distributed by: Yash Raj Films; Sunny Sounds Pvt. Ltd. YPD Films Ltd UK (YPD 2); Pen India Limited (YPD - Phir Se)
- Release dates: 14 January 2011 (1); 7 June 2013 (2); 31 August 2018 (3)
- Running time: 464 minutes
- Country: India
- Language: Hindi
- Budget: ₹94 crore
- Box office: ₹146.95 crore

Yamla Pagla Deewana also known as YPD is a series of Indian action comedy films, produced by Vijayta Films. The first part Yamla Pagla Deewana released in 2011 and the second part Yamla Pagla Deewana 2 released in 2013. And the third part named Yamla Pagla Deewana: Phir Se was released on 31 August 2018.

== Overview ==
| Film | Release date | Director | Screenwriter(s) | Producer(s) |
|---|---|---|---|---|
| Yamla Pagla Deewana | 14 January 2011 | Samir Karnik | Jasvinder Bath | Samir Karnik & Nitin Manmohan |
| Yamla Pagla Deewana 2 | 7 June 2013 | Sangeeth Sivan | Jasvinder Bath | Dharmendra |
| Yamla Pagla Deewana: Phir Se | 31 August 2018 | Navaniat Singh | Dheeraj Rattan | Kamayani Punia Sharma & Aarushi Malhotra |

=== Yamla Pagla Deewana (2011) ===
Paramvir Singh (Sunny Deol) is a Non-resident Indian (NRI) living happily with his Canadian wife Mary (Emma Brown Garett) along with his two kids Karam and Veer and his mother (Nafisa Ali) in Vancouver, British Columbia, Canada. Years ago, after the birth of Paramvir's younger brother Gajodhar, Paramvir's father, Dharam Singh (Dharmendra) had run away from home and took Gajodhar with him, due to difficulties with the family. Back in reality, a Canadian comes to visit Paramvir at his home, where he sees Dharam Singh's photo. The Canadian recognises Dharam as a thief who had robbed him when he went to tour in Banaras. Upon hearing this news, Paramvir's mother sends him to Banaras to find his father, and younger brother.

When Paramvir reaches Banaras, he meets a youngster who cons him off all his money. Seeking help, Paramvir lands up at a bar, where he sees both Dharam Singh, and his brother Gajodhar Singh (Bobby Deol), who has now grown up. Paramvir realises Gajodhar is in fact the youngster who had earlier conned him, and is disappointed to see both his father and brother are con-men. When Paramvir sees Dharam alone, he confronts him and tells him his identity. However, Dharam refuses to acknowledge him as his son. Soon, Paramvir saves Gajodhar from getting attacked by goons, to which Gajodhar befriends him and accepts him to their team, not knowing that he is his elder brother.

During this time, Gajodhar falls in love with Saheba (Kulraj Randhawa), a Punjabi author. Dharam and Paramvir help him woo her, and the two start a relationship. Soon enough, Saheba's tough brothers find out, and beat Gajodhar up, and take Saheba back to Punjab. When Dharam sees that Gajodhar is hopeless, he breaks out, and asks Paramvir to help, and acknowledges that he is his father but he shouldn't tell Gajodhar anything about that, after which Paramvir and Gajodhar move to Punjab to get back his love.

Saheba's elder brother Joginder Singh (Anupam Kher)who is a cruel land of his village and her other brothers want to marry her to an NRI. Upon hearing this, Paramvir disguises Gajodhar up to make him look like a Punjabi, and they both go to Saheba's house, with Gajodhar pretending to be an NRI named Karamveer. On the other hand, Joginder has an arch-rival Minty(Puneet Issar) who wants to take Joginders place and doesn't want Joginder to win in upcoming elections. Joginder, after meeting both of them, decides that they would marry their sister to Paramvir, not to Gajodhar. However, Paramvir is already married. One night, Paramvir gets drunk and beats up Saheba's brothers but that only managed to worsen the matter. So Paramvir tells Gajodhar to run away with Saheba one night.

While they are making their escape, Dharam shows up with a band of musicians thus preventing Gajodhar and Saheba from running away because Dharam thinks Gajodhar is the one getting married but Saheba's family has chosen Paramvir. Dharam tells Paramvir and Gajodhar that Paramvir should be the one running away. So Paramvir attempts to go to the market but Poli brings him back home causing Joginder to think that Gajodhar and Dharam are joking as they said Paramvir is scared of marriage but unbeknownst to Dharam and Gajodhar, he is right behind them.

Joginder decides to get Poli married to Gajodhar which Gajodhar confesses to Saheba that he does not want at all and they will escape that very night. Again, they fail as Paramvir's wife Mary shows up with Karam and Veer (Paramvir's sons). Paramvir, Gajodhar and Dharam make up the story that she is their neighbour in Canada and that her husband is also named Paramvir who went missing last year. Mary knows that Paramvir is in front of her but chooses not to say anything because it will ruin the whole plan.

Joginder somehow finds out what has been on all this while and gets his men to attack Paramvir, Gajodhar and Dharam. Paramvir and Dharam beat his men up until Minty and his men show up. As Minty is about the attack Joginder, Gajodhar rescues him hence earning approval to marry Saheba instead of Paramveer. In the end, Dharam, Gajodhar, Paramvir, Mary, Saheba, Karam and Veer go to Canada where they live as one happy family.

=== Yamla Pagla Deewana 2 (2013) ===
In Varanasi, Dharam Dhillon (Dharmendra) and his son Gajodhar—or Prem (Bobby Deol)—are conning people into thinking that Dharam is a guru named Yamla Baba. When Yograj Khanna (Annu Kapoor) comes from England to meet Dharam, Dharam notices Khanna's diamond rings. Dharam and Gajodhar pretend to own a company, Oberoi, Oberoi & Oberoi. Impressed, Yograj begins to consider a match for his daughter Suman (Neha Sharma). Suman falls in love with Gajodhar, and a marriage is arranged in England when Dharam's older son Paramveer (Sunny Deol)—a loan-recovery agent for a bank—meets Khanna.

Paramveer appears at Khanna's club as Joginder (Dude) Armstrong (Anupam Kher) arrives to take it over, and beats up Armstrong's flunkies and goons. Grateful, Khanna hires him as his manager. Paramveer then finds Dharam and Gajodhar trying to swindle his boss.

Dharam and Gajodhar go to a house occupied by an orangutan, Einstein, whose absent owner (a disciple of Yamla Baba) has allowed them to stay there. The next day they go to Khanna's house for Gajodhar and Suman's engagement party, at which Paramveer is a guest. Paramveer meets art-gallery employee Reet (Kristina), with whom he falls in love. After Suman and Gajodhar are engaged, Gajodhar and Dharam discover that Reet (not Suman) is Khanna's daughter.

Although Gajodhar woos Reet, she is interested in Paramveer. Dharam claims to have another child, Prem's twin Q (Deol). When Q meets the Khannas he claims to be a painter, which attracts Reet.

Q unsuccessfully tries to produce a painting. During the night Einstein paints a beautiful picture, which Q passes off as his own. The painting becomes famous, and will be sold at auction. Paramveer makes changes to Khanna's nightclub, and Khanna wants Q to be his guest of honor. At the party, Reet asks Paramveer how he feels about her. Drunk, he tries to reveal Q's identity when he is distracted by Armstrong's goons. The next morning Reet goes to Paramveer's house but leaves, heartbroken, when she sees a girl sleeping with him.

Preparations for Prem and Suman's marriage are underway. Reet agrees to marry Q, and Paramveer wants a joint wedding. Dharam tries to convince Suman that Prem is impotent, and anyone who marries him will die in seven months. Despite this, Suman tells Prem that she loves him and Prem falls in love with her. When he goes to tell the truth to the Khannas, Armstrong's goons kidnap him, Dharam and the Khannas. Prem reveals the truth, Param saves everyone from the goons and proposes to Reet (which she accepts), and the film ends happily.

=== Yamla Pagla Deewana: Phir Se (2018) ===
==== Production ====
The official announcement of the film was announced in June 2017.

The film will continue to have the franchise's original male cast: Dharmendra, Sunny and Bobby. However, there will be a different set of leading ladies paired opposite them.

Principal photography of the film commenced in the second week of August 2017. The first schedule of the film will be shot in Ramoji Film City.

== Cast and characters ==
| Actors | Film | | |
| Actors | Yamla Pagla Deewana (2011) | Yamla Pagla Deewana 2 (2013) | Yamla Pagla Deewana Phir Se (2018) |
|---|---|---|---|
| Dharmendra | Dharam Singh Dhillon | Dharam Singh Dhillon / Dharam Oberoi / Yamla Baba | Jaywant Parmar / Parmar Shah (fake) |
| Sunny Deol | Paramveer Singh Dhillon | Paramveer Singh Dhillon | Puran Singh / Puran Shah (fake) |
| Bobby Deol | Gajodhar Singh Dhillon / Karamveer Singh Dhillon | Gajodhar Singh Dhillon / Prem Oberoi / Q Oberoi | Kala "K" Singh / Kalia / Kala Shah (fake) |
| Anupam Kher | Joginder Singh Brar | Joginder (Dude G.) Armstrong | |
| Johnny Lever | Jeweller | Bunty | |
| Sucheta Khanna | Poli Kaur Brar | Babli | |
| Mukul Dev | Gurmeet (Billa) | Gyanprakash | |
| Kulraj Randhawa | Saheba Brar | | |
| Nafisa Ali | Mother of Paramveer Singh Dhillon and Gajodhar Singh | | |
| Puneet Issar | Tejpaal Singh aka Minty | | |
| Himanshu Malik | Tejinder (Jarnail) | | |
| Emma Brown Garett | Mary Dhillon | | |
| Digvijay Rohildas | Balbir (Kaalu) | | |
| Krip Suri | Sukhdev (Kohti) | | |
| Gurbachan Singh | Babbu | | |
| Lokesh Tilakdhari | Lokesh | | |
| Nikunj Pandey | Karam | | |
| Amit Mistry | Binda | | |
| Edward Sonnenblick | Bob Ji | | |
| Kristina Akheeva | | Reet Khanna | |
| Neha Sharma | | Suman Khanna | |
| Annu Kapoor | | Yograj Khanna | |
| Arjun (Firoz Khan) | | Sikh inspector in London | |
| Kriti Kharbanda | | | Chikoo |
| Binnu Dhillon | | | Billa Singh |
| Asrani | | | Nanu |
| Shatrughan Sinha | | | Judge Sunil "Mithoo" Sinha |
| Mohan Kapoor | | | Marfatia |
| Satish Kaushik | | | Avocate Rajender Uttam Singh Bedi |
| Rajesh Sharma | | | Lawyer Bhatia |

== Crew ==
| Occupation | Film | | |
| Occupation | Yamla Pagla Deewana (2011) | Yamla Pagla Deewana 2 (2013) | Yamla Pagla Deewana: Phir Se (2018) |
|---|---|---|---|
| Director | Samir Karnik | Sangeeth Sivan | Navaniat Singh |
| Producer(s) | Samir Karnik; Nitin Manmohan | Dharmendra | Kamyani Punia Sharma, Aarushi Malhotra |
| Screenplay | Jasvinder Bath | Jasvinder Bath | Dheeraj Rattan |
| Story | Jasvinder Bath | Lynda Deol | Dheeraj Rattan |
| Cinematography | Kabir Lal; Binod Pradhan | Neha Parti | TBA |
| Editor | Mukesh Thakur | TBA | TBA |
| Music director(s) | Laxmikant–Pyarelal; Anu Malik; Rhythm Dhol Bass; Nouman Javaid; Sandesh Shandilya; Rahul Seth | Sharib-Toshi; Sachin Gupta | Vishal Mishra; Sanjeev-Darshan; Sachet–Parampara; D' Soldierz |
| Background Score | Sanjoy Chowdhury | Raju Singh | Raju Singh |
| Production companies | One Up Entertainment; Top Angle Productions | Sunny Sounds Pvt. Ltd | Sunny Sounds Pvt. Ltd. Intercut Entertainment; Pen India Limited |
| Distributor | NH Studios; Eros International | Yash Raj Films; Sunny Sounds Pvt. Ltd. | Soham Rockstar Entertainment; Zee Studios International |

== Release and revenue ==
| Film | Release date | Budget | Box office revenue |
|---|---|---|---|
| Yamla Pagla Deewana | 14 January 2011 | ₹130 million (US$1.4 million) | ₹720 million (US$7.7 million) |
| Yamla Pagla Deewana 2 | 7 June 2013 | ₹250 million (US$2.7 million) | ₹480 million (US$5.1 million) |
| Yamla Pagla Deewana: Phir Se | 31 August 2018 | ₹300 million (US$3.2 million) | ₹149 million (US$1.6 million) |
| Total | | ₹680 million (US$7.3 million) Three films | ₹1.3 billion (US$14 million) Three films |
