= Pratigya (1975 film) =

Pratiggya
- Film poster
- Directed by: Dulal Guha
- Written by: Safiq Ansari; Nabendu Ghosh; Kanwar Ajit Singh
- Produced by: Bikram Singh Dehal; Kanwar Ajit Singh
- Starring: Dharmendra; Hema Malini
- Cinematography: M. Rajaram
- Edited by: Bimal Roy Jr.
- Music by: Laxmikant–Pyarelal
- Distributed by: Bikramjeet Films International; Digital Entertainment
- Release date: 19 September 1975
- Running time: 153 minutes
- Country: India
- Language: Hindi

Pratiggya (transl. The Vow) is a 1975 Indian Hindi-language action comedy film. Produced by Dharmendra and B. S. Deol, the film is directed by Dulal Guha. The music was by Laxmikant-Pyarelal and the lyricist was Anand Bakshi. It stars Dharmendra, Hema Malini, Ajit, Johnny Walker, Jagdeep, Mukri, Mehar Mittal and Keshto Mukherjee.

The story revolves around Dharmendra out to avenge his parents' brutal murder by Ajit in this "violent revenge" story. Along with its strong action scenes it also had a significant comic track in the form of "slapstick" comedy getting the film referred to as a "masterpiece in comedy". The film was a big commercial success at the box-office and among the top 3 grossers for the year in India.

== Plot ==
Ajit Singh, an illiterate truck driver, learns from his dying adoptive mother, that he is the only surviving son of an honest cop who was killed and his entire family obliterated by the dreaded dacoit Bharat Thakur and so, he swears revenge.

On his way to Dinapur, the dacoit's hideout, he meets a grievously injured cop, Inspector D'Souza, who dies protecting his stash of ammunition from local dacoits. Inspector D'Souza was en route to the village of Dinapur to set up a police station with his men and the ammo, and he leaves the weapons at Ajit Singh's disposal before succumbing to his wounds. Ajit Singh uses this new found stash of machine guns and grenades to pose as a cop and sets up a police station in the aforementioned village with the help of the villagers.

Ajit's love interest is the feisty and pretty village belle Radha, who is the niece of dreaded dacoit Bharat Thakur but hates his ways and supports Ajit Singh. Bharat Thakur himself is a cunning man and he sets up his man, the village drunkard Chandi as a spy within the village police station nexus. The rest of the film follows the struggle between Ajit Singh and Bharat and how he goes about taking his revenge and thus fulfilling his Pratigya (Promise).

== Cast ==
- Dharmendra as Inspector Devendra Singh / Ajit Singh / Thanedaar Indrajeet Singh (Double Role)
- Hema Malini as Radha Thakur
- Ajit as Bharat Daku
- Johnny Walker as Birju Thekedaar
- Jagdeep as Kanha
- Pradeep Kumar as Habibullah
- Abhi Bhattacharya as Inspector Abhijeet Singh
- Nazir Hussain as Sipahi Shivcharan
- Keshto Mukherjee as Chandi
- Sapru as Purohit Patil
- Satyen Kappu as Inspector D'Souza
- Kanwar Ajit Singh Deol as Truck driver Jatin
- Rammohan Sharma as Bhiku
- Mehar Mittal as Dinapur Resident Avinash
- Sunder as Barber Dinapur Resident Bhuvan
- D. K. Sapru as Purohit Patil
- Imtiaz Khan as Raghu, Bharat Thakur's Brother
- Brahamchari as Sidhu
- Leela Mishra as Rati, Ajit's foster mother
- Urmila Bhatt as Sujata D Singh, Mrs. D. Singh
- Birbal as Dinapur Resident Balraj Bahadur
- Ramayan Tiwari as Shambhu Prasad
- Bhushan Tiwari as Daaku Chirjinlal
- Moolchand as Seth KK, Ajit's passenger

== Music ==
The music direction was by Laxmikant-Pyarelal with lyrics written by Anand Bakshi. The playback singing was by Lata Mangeshkar and Mohammed Rafi. The song "Main Jat Yamla Pagla Deewana" became a popular song remaining so till date. The song's opening line was used as a title for Dharmendra's home productions starring him and his two sons, Sunny Deol and Bobby Deol, with the first released in 2011, and the sequels in 2013 and 2018, and was then remixed for the first film by RDB and sung by Sonu Nigam and Nindy Kaur.

=== Song list ===
| Song | Singer |
|---|---|
| "Main Jangal Ki Morni" | Lata Mangeshkar |
| "Pardesi Aaya Des Mein" | Lata Mangeshkar |
| "Uth Nind Se Mirziya Jaag Ja" | Lata Mangeshkar, Mohammed Rafi |
| "Main Jat Yamla Pagla Deewana" | Mohammed Rafi |
