= Uppi 2 =

2015 film by Upendra

- Theatrical release poster
- Directed by: Upendra
- Written by: Upendra
- Produced by: Priyanka Upendra
- Starring: Upendra; Kristina Akheeva
- Cinematography: Ashok Kashyap
- Edited by: Sri Crazymindz
- Music by: Gurukiran
- Production companies: Upendra Productions; Sri Lakshmi Narasimha Productions / Nallamalupu Bujji (Telugu dubbing)
- Distributed by: Shankar Enterprises (Karnataka); RS Films (AP/TG)
- Release date: 14 August 2015 (India)
- Running time: 136 minutes
- Country: India
- Language: Kannada
- Box office: ₹40 crores

Uppi 2 is a 2015 Indian Kannada-language allegorical thriller film written and directed by Upendra, and produced by his wife and actress Priyanka Upendra. It is a sequel to the 1999 cult film Upendra. The film stars an ensemble cast featuring Upendra, Kristina Akheeva, Parul Yadav, Sayaji Shinde, Shobaraj, Satyajit, Bank Janardhan, Vaijanath Biradar and Mimicry Dayanand. The soundtrack and background score were composed by Gurukiran.

Uppi 2 was released on 14 August 2015, coinciding with Indian Independence Day, and received mixed reviews for its convoluted plot and narrative. Despite this, the film became a commercial success and completed 50 days run at the box-office and became one of the highest grossing Kannada movie of 2015. Upendra won the SIIMA Award for Best Director for the film. It was dubbed in Telugu as Upendra 2 and was released along with the Kannada version.

== Plot ==
Neenu (transl. You) is a happy and content person, who never thinks about the future and is undisturbed by the past. He hardly earns anything despite his toil since he never takes money from anyone for his services, often menial jobs, asked to him to be done by the people of his locality and the crew of the film production unit. Lakshmi, a psychology student, takes interest in him after she learns from her professor about Naanu (transl. I). (The character from the prequel who eventually becomes Neenu) Her constant pursuit of him eventually leads to his discovery. Moved by his happy, unblemished and selfless personality, she eventually falls in love with him, but she fails to take him out of his strange world of selflessness.

Meanwhile, Saleem is a crime boss based in Dubai, who is aided by his trusted aide "Malpe" Bala and his henchmen in finding Neenu, regarding a property worth ₹100 crore (US$10 million) belonging to a rich widow named Mandakini, who has become a follower of Neenu, who was formerly an aghori. The aghori is also being shown exploiting Sheela, who comes seeking spiritual advice after being dejected in love. Simultaneously, Neenu is seen being chased by police officer Shinde, who tries to find him and embezzle the property. Unknown about this, some of the officers from the CID interpret Neenu as an undercover agent trying to capture Saleem.

Neenu finally manages to subdue his chasers by instigating the cops against the goons and grips with Lakshmi. It becomes apparent that Mandakini is a "fictional character" imagined by the cops and Neenu is just a normal man. The will made by Mandakini of her property gives a philosophical view that when one stops saying Naanu (transl. I), which symbolizes fear, anger, jealousy and selfishness; holds to Neenu (transl. You), which symbolizes gratitude, kindness, selflessness; and when one stops thinking about the past and the future, will khushi (transl. Happiness), the "daughter" of Mandakini (transl. Calmness in the Heart) would stay with him forever.

== Cast ==
- Upendra as Naanu / Neenu
- Kristina Akheeva as Lakshmi / Khushi
- Parul Yadav as Sheela (extended cameo)
- Sayaji Shinde
- Sathyajith
- Shobaraj as Saleem
- R. N. Sudarshan as a legislator
- Nagaraj Murthy
- Tennis Krishna as Hula
- Mimicry Dayanand as Swami Akhilanda
- Tanishka Kapoor as Lakshmi's friend
- Sanjay Aryan
- Vinayak Trivedi
- Chethan as a CBI officer
- Tumkur Mohan
- Bank Janardhan
- Vaijanath Biradar as Constable Rajguru
- Saroja Srishailan
- Suvarna Shetty
- Urmila
- Shruthi
- Sri (Crazy Mindz)
- Manjaiah
- Manjunatha Rao in a cameo appearance (uncredited)

== Production ==
=== Development ===
Following the massive success of his 1999 film Upendra, Upendra had always wanted to make a sequel to it. Having written the story sometime in the early 2000s, it was ready by 2004. In January 2012, Upendra announced that he is working on the script for the sequel titled Upendra 2. The first posters of Upendra 2 were released on the Internet on 16 September 2012. The posters featured a huge rectangle, with no clear name inside it, but with a heap of mathematical formulae – be it arithmetic, algebra, geometry, analytical geometry, calculus and so on – and had a byline – "directed by Upendra". The title of the film was changed to Uppi 2 after he saw it painted on the back of an auto rickshaw. Uppi 2 was launched by Upendra on 18 September 2013 at Kanteerava Studios in Bangalore, amongst thousands of fans gathered to witness the launch. Lathi Charge from the police to control the crowd of fans gathered at the venue was reported.

=== Casting ===
As the makers were on the lookout for the female lead for the film, the names of Bollywood actresses Aishwarya Rai Bachchan and Vidya Balan made rounds. Eventually, a Russian model-turned-actress Kristina Akheeva landed the role.

=== Marketing ===
Right from the time Upendra announced of making the film, posters made by fans began circulating on social media platforms, most of which featured Upendra in costume from his eponymous prequel to Uppi 2. The official first look poster was revealed on 1 November 2014. This was followed by numerous fan-made posters released by Upendra on his Facebook page, which were in turn circulated and received widespread popularity leading up to the film's release. The first teaser trailer of the film was released on 18 September 2014, marking Upendra's 47th birthday. Alongside, fan-made Dubsmash videos and teasers were circulated and shared by the official Facebook and Twitter handles of the film. The first look poster of the film's Telugu version was released in August 2015. Upendra launched an official app of the film and other merchandise including T-shirts featuring the film's title logo, a week prior to its release. The second teaser trailer was released on 10 August 2015. It featured Upendra doing a yoga posture, sirsasana, in the Himalayan region, and sporting the look of an aghori. The cutout poster of this was unveiled by him at a theatre in Bangalore.

An adventure mobile video game, Uppi2 Game Official, was released as a tie-in for the film by Mobi2Fun.

== Soundtrack ==
Uppi 2

Soundtrack album by Gurukiran
- Released: 17 July 2015
- Recorded: 2014–2015
- Genre: Feature film soundtrack
- Length: 26:28
- Label: Junglee Music
- Producer: Gurukiran

Gurukiran chronology
Rangan Style (2014)	Uppi 2 (2015)	Nagarahavu (2016)

Gurukiran, who scored for the prequel Upendra, composed the soundtrack and background score for Uppi 2 as well. The lyrics for the soundtrack were penned by Upendra, where it also marked the reunion of Gurukiran and Upendra after 16 years. Times Music bought the music rights of the film and was produced under their label Junglee Music. The soundtrack album consists of six tracks. It was released on 17 July 2015 at Ruppis Resort in Bangalore. Simultaneously, the soundtrack was released by fan clubs of Upendra in around 15 districts across Karnataka.

The Telugu version of the album was released on 9 August 2015 in Hyderabad.

=== Track listing ===
No.	Title	Lyrics	Singer(s)	Length
1.	"Uppittu Uppittu"	Upendra	Puneeth Rajkumar	3:59
2.	"Excuse Me Please"	Upendra	Upendra	4:59
3.	"Yochane Madbeda"	Upendra	Vijay Prakash	3:59
4.	"Ivan Yaro Different"	Upendra	Chaitra H. G., Nitin Rajaram Shastry	4:51
5.	"Baekoo Baekoo Anno"	Upendra	Gurukiran	4:20
6.	"Baekoo Baekoo Anno (reprise)"	Upendra	Nakash Aziz	4:20
Total length:				26:28

Ytalkies.com reviewed the album and gave it a mixed review it considering that "Uppi [Upendra] and Gurukiran combo" were coming together after long time and fans having had to wait two years for the album. The reviewer called the track "Baekoo Baekoo Anno" and wrote, "the peppy beats and deep-thinking lyrics are very entertaining." Of the track "Excuse Me Please", he wrote, "This is more of a ‘different style dialogue narration’ song; Uppi takes over the song with some entertaining lyrics, where he explains that time is everything..." He concluded calling it "[a] very average album".

== Controversies ==
Ever since filming began in 2014, Upendra had been accused of plagiarism of the film's story, after similar accusations that followed after his previous directorial decided to take legal action against the accuser. Responding to the controversy, he wrote on his Facebook page, "Deeply disturbed with all these questions about the Uppi 2 script... There is no way we will tolerate any false allegations about the script."

A day after the release of the film's soundtrack album, on 17 July 2015, another controversy came about over the lyrics of the song "No Excuse Me Please", penned and sung by Upendra himself. It features lyrics sung in a conversation tone in the form of a monologue with rhythm, and was reported that it takes a dig at other actors including Shiva Rajkumar and Yash. The media reported the story over Upendra crediting himself over introducing machete-wielding lead actors in Kannada cinema, through Shiva Rajkumar, in his directorial Om (1995).

== Release ==
The film was given the "U/A" (Parental Guidance) certificate by the Regional Censor Board. The Board asked the makers for a "violent visual" and two dialogues to be cut, and muting a couple of other dialogues, adding up to a total of five cuts. It released theatrically on 14 August 2015, on the eve of Indian Independence Day, in over 200 screens in Karnataka, and 400 screens in Telugu in Andhra Pradesh and Telangana, adding up to over 685 screens. The Telugu dubbing rights was acquired by film producer Nallamalupu Bujji and the rights for distribution in Andhra Pradesh and Telangana were bought by RS Films for ₹1.08 crore. It was reported that the distribution rights for Karnataka were acquired by Srikanth of Shankar Enterprises for a sum of ₹100 million. Uppi 2 was also released in the US, Australia among other countries.

== Reception ==
Uppi 2 received mixed to positive reviews from critics who praised its themes, cinematography and Upendra's performance, but criticism directed towards its soundtrack, convoluted plot and "abrupt ending".

=== Critical response ===
Archana Nathan of The Hindu called the film a "self-help book" where "Upendra wonders... about the concept of you (neenu) "unearth[ing] theories about the different kinds of people on this planet, their manner of thinking..." and handing down "some life advice." She further wrote, "Upendra theorises about three different kinds of people: those who obsess about the future, those who live in the past and finally, those who live entirely in the present. It is the third kind that he champions and practises in the film. Uppi2 wants to reform you but overdoes it." S. Viswanath of Deccan Herald wrote, "... Upendra takes on a highly philosophical pitch while narrating a convoluted, but cracker of an action plot." He called the film Upendra's "show all the away" and added that "he goes on philosophising about the real and unreal, seen and unseen, the here and now. [the film] climaxes to an unpredictable end, you are in a tizzy, swirled and squished by the storytelling."

Shyam Prasad S. of Bangalore Mirror felt that "[t]he execution of the film does not match the brilliance of the script." He drew comparisons of the protagonist's role and philosophy of life to Eckhart Tolle's work The Power of Now and called the lead character a pale shadow of his trademark eccentric characters in A and Upendra which behaved like Jean-Paul Sartre's Erostratus. A. Sharadhaa of The New Indian Express felt the film was "[H]igh on intrinsic value" and wrote, "It may be an ambitious attempt to teach life lessons to the common man, but that is exactly the reason why Uppi 2 could fall into the category of films which were bold enough to go beyond the obvious. And surely, even with its little puzzles, the film does not disappoint." She further wrote, "As an actor too, he [Upendra] portrays the various shades of life with élan. His different avatars all send a message. Kristina Akheeva has tried her best to live up to expectations while Parul Yadav’s short and sweet role has a good impact."

Sunayana Suresh of The Times of India felt that it "preach[es] his [Upendra's] brand of pop philosophy, which has far evolved from the one he preached in the decade-old film Upendra". She wrote, "Parul Yadav's cameo is one of the highlights of the film. Upendra is at his vintage best when it comes to acting." She felt that Kristina Akheeva's casting was "debatable" noting that "she doesn't seem to add much weight to the film" with her lip sync also going "awry".

== Box office ==
=== Domestic ===
Uppi 2 opened very strongly in theatres and registered a 100% occupancy in most theatres across Karnataka and from screening in the United States. Many theaters scheduled the first show on Friday as early as 6 AM. Advanced bookings which were opened online two days earlier on Wednesday got a huge response. Most of the shows at single screens and multiplexes in Bengaluru were sold out soon. It collected ₹3.25 crore on its first day from Karnataka alone setting up records for the highest first day for a Kannada movie. The business saw a growth on Saturday due to Independence Day. As a result, the film earned ₹3.60 crore on the second day taking the two-day total business of the film to ₹6.85 crore. The film collected a total of ₹10 crore in its first weekend. It reportedly collected more than ₹15 crore in 3 weeks from release in Karnataka. The film completed 50 days run in theaters. It collected ₹80 lakh share in Andhra Pradesh and Telangana. According to Bookmyshow website's Best of 2015 survey, Uppi 2 sold the second highest number of tickets on Bookmyshow among Kannada movies in 2015 behind RangiTaranga and ahead of other box-office hits like Mr. and Mrs. Ramachari, Ranna and Rana Vikrama.

=== Overseas ===
Upon release in the US in 21 screens, it collected US$31,981 (₹21.26 lakh) in its first weekend. On course of a successful run in the US, it was further released in over 20 screens and Upendra was invited there in September 2015 to promote the film. After its 8th weekend in the US, the film had collected a total of US$47,347 (₹30.88 lakh). Uppi 2 is the second highest grossing Kannada film in US behind RangiTaranga (which grossed ₹2.1 crore) and ahead of the third highest grosser Mr. and Mrs. Ramachari (which grossed ₹8 lakh in US). It also opened to houseful screenings in Australia (Perth, Melbourne, Sydney), Germany and Singapore.

== Awards ==
Award	Category	Recipient	Result	Ref.
5th South Indian International Movie Awards	Best Film	Upendra Productions	Nominated	
5th South Indian International Movie Awards	Best Director	Upendra	Won	
5th South Indian International Movie Awards	Best Actor	Upendra	Nominated	
5th South Indian International Movie Awards	Best Music Director	Guru Kiran	Nominated	
5th South Indian International Movie Awards	Best Playback Singer - Male	Gurukiran ("Baekoo Baekoo")	Nominated	

== See also ==
- List of Kannada films of 2015
