= Breakaway (2011 film) =

2011 Canadian film

- Release poster
- Directed by: Robert Lieberman
- Screenplay by: Roberts Gannaway; Jeff Winfeld
- Story by: Tony Graig; Roberts Gannaway
- Produced by: Akshay Kumar; Paul Gross; Ajay Virmani
- Starring: Vinay Virmani; Camilla Belle; Rob Lowe; Anupam Kher; Russell Peters
- Cinematography: Steve Danyluk
- Edited by: Susan Shipton
- Music by: Paul Intson; Sandeep Chowta
- Production companies: Viacom 18 Motion Pictures; Hari Om Productions; First Take Entertainment; Don Carmody Productions; Whizbang Films
- Distributed by: Alliance Films (Canada); Viacom 18 Motion Pictures (India)
- Release date: 23 September 2011
- Running time: 101 minutes
- Countries: Canada; India; United States
- Languages: English; Hindi; Punjabi
- Budget: $12 million

Breakaway is a 2011 sports-comedy film directed by Robert Lieberman, and produced by Akshay Kumar and Paul Gross. The film stars Vinay Virmani in his debut performance opposite Camilla Belle, with Rob Lowe, Russell Peters and Anupam Kher in pivotal roles. It also features Akshay Kumar, Drake and Ludacris in cameo roles. In addition, this was the last film directed by Lieberman before his death in July 2023. The film also contains songs in Hindi and Punjabi.

The film was released on 23 September 2011 and received negative reviews. The film was released in India as Speedy Singhs and failed to sell many tickets in the Indian market.

The story of the film is set in Brampton. It is filmed in Toronto.

== Plot ==
Rajveer Singh (Vinay Virmani) is a college dropout who spends his spare time playing hockey with his friends. He and his father, Darvesh (Anupam Kher), both work at Darvesh's younger brother's trucking company, where Darvesh encourages Rajveer to take on more responsibility in order to one day take over the company. Rajveer is Sikh, but cut his hair after being bullied by kids as a child (which he personally regrets). This and his lack of commitment to the trucking company is a point of contention between him and his father.

During a pick up game, Rajveer tries out for the Hammerheads (a league team) but despite being the best player on the ice, the coach gives him the cold shoulder. Feeling slighted, Rajveer decides to create a league team with his friends.

Darvesh disapproves of the idea and forbids Rajveer from playing any more hockey, but Rajveer continues to play with his friends secretly, saying he's working more routes at the trucking company. He and his team eventually name themselves the "Speedy Singhs" and capture the attention of the hockey rink owner, Dan Winters (Rob Lowe) who agrees to coach them. They need a sponsor and recruit Rajveer's uncle Sammy (Gurpreet Ghuggi) who keeps Rajveer's hockey playing a secret. While playing, Rajveer also starts dating Dan's younger sister, Melissa (Camilla Belle).

Darvesh later figures out that Rajveer has been playing hockey and when a night out celebrating with the team ends poorly, Darvesh kicks Rajveer out of the house after an argument. Frustrated, Rajveer also ends up arguing with Dan, and quits the team. Though the Speedy Singhs make it to the finals against the Hammerheads without Rajveer, Melissa reveals that the Speedy Singhs must wear helmets, which they cannot do unless they remove their turbans. Inspired by the story of why Sikh men wear turbans, Rajveer obtains special helmets that will accommodate the team's turbans and pays for the legal fees to allow them. He apologizes to Dan and the Speedy Singhs for his selfishness and they accept him back.

The day of the finals coincides with Rajveer's cousin Reena (Noureen DeWulf), and her fiancé, Sonu's (Russell Peters) wedding. When Sonu thanks all the guests, he brings up how the Speedy Singhs have become a source of pride for the community and encourages everyone to attend the finals. Rajveer tries once again to express his passion for hockey to Darvesh, but he refuses to attend. The Speedy Singhs do well until the Hammerheads tie at the end of the third period, forcing overtime. Darvesh, after listening to the close game on the radio at the temple, arrives at the arena to show his support. Spurred by his father's arrival, Rajveer scores the winning goal and hugs Darvesh in the rink.

== Cast ==
- Vinay Virmani as Rajveer Singh
- Camilla Belle as Melissa Winters
- Russell Peters as Sonu Gill
- Anupam Kher as Darvesh Singh
- Rob Lowe as Coach Dan Winters
- Gurpreet Ghuggi as Uncle Sammy
- Sakina Jaffrey as Livleen Singh
- Noureen DeWulf as Reena
- Ali Mukaddam as Inderjit Singh
- Prem Singh as Deva Singh
- Navi Dhanoa as Officer Diaz

Special appearances (in alphabetical order);

- Akshay Kumar as himself and in the song "Shera Di Kaum"
- Drake as himself in the club party scene
- Ludacris as himself in the song "Shera Di Kaum"
- Lilly Singh as a Bhangra Dancer in the wedding scene

== Soundtrack ==
Breakaway / Speedy Singhs

Soundtrack album by Sandeep Chowta
- Genre: Feature film soundtrack
- Label: T-Series

The head of Columbia Records India, Sandeep Chowta composed the music for Breakaway. Including special features by RDB, Jassi Sidhu, Rishi Rich Productions, Bohemia, J.Hind, Ludacris, Sukshinder Shinda, Jazzy B and Malkit Singh.

=== Track listing ===
No.	Title	Singer(s)	Length
1.	"Shera Di Kaum"	RDB ft Ludacris	3:50
2.	"Ne Aaja Veh"	Veronica ft H-Dhami	3:25
3.	"Sansar"	Bohemia	2:31
4.	"Veer Ji Viyohn"	Jassi Sidhu	3:35
5.	"Chaddi Wale Yaar"	Josh	3:42
6.	"Rail Gaddie"	Jassi Sidhu	3:45
7.	"Chaddi Wale Yaar (International Mix)"	Josh	4:00
8.	"Sansar"	RDB ft J.Hind	2:30
9.	"Breakaway Champion"	J.Hind	2:45

== Reception ==
Breakaway received negative reviews from critics upon release. Rotten Tomatoes reports a 20% approval rating, based on five reviews. At the Indian box office, the film opened poorly and subsequently failed to pick up over the weekend. The film then faced a further drop throughout the next few days worldwide and was declared a "disaster" by Box Office India.

The film was dubbed into Hindi and retitled as Speedy Singhs, but opened to mostly negative reviews from Indian critics. Taran Adarsh from Bollywood Hungama rated it as 1.5 out of 5 and said "Speedy Singhs fails to deliver!" Komal Nahta gave it 1 out of 5 stars and claimed "If you want to watch a disaster version of Chak De! India, definitely watch Speedy Singhs!"

== See also ==
- List of films about ice hockey
