= Hari Mirchi Lal Mirchi =

Tv serial on DD national

- Genre: Comedy, Drama
- Written by: Ashok Patole
- Directed by: Rajesh Gupta
- Starring: See below
- Opening theme: "Hari Mirchi Lal Mirchi" by Mahalaxmi Iyer
- Country of origin: India
- Original language: Hindi
- No. of seasons: 1
- No. of episodes: 196

Production
- Producer: Rakesh Chowdhary
- Camera setup: Multi-camera
- Running time: 25 minutes
- Production company: Samvaad Video Private Limited

Original release
- Network: DD National
- Release: 27 October 2005 – 20 August 2009

Hari Mirchi Lal Mirchi is an Indian Hindi television series which premiered on 27 October 2005 and ended on 20 August 2009.

== Cast ==
- Tushar Dalvi as Rohan Khanna
- Shalini Kapoor / Sucheta Khanna as Ritu Khanna: Rohan's first wife (2005–2007)
- Neeru Bajwa / Surbhi Tiwari / Shilpa Shinde / Tiya Verma / Malini Kapoor as Rinku Khanna: Rohan's second wife
- Ashiesh Roy as Tutun: Rohan's friend
- Shahnawaz Pradhan as Ritu's father
- Anita Kanwal / Shubhangi Gokhale as Ritu's mother
- Suhita Thatte / Yamini Singh as Rinku's mother
- Madhavi Chopra as Munmun: Tutun's wife
- Firdaus Mevawalla as PK Daruwalla: Rohan's Boss
- Jhumma Mitra as Sapna: Rohan's secretary
- Melanie Nazareth secretary of Rohan
- Darshan Kumar
- Sharmilee Raj as Various characters
- Rohitash Gaud as Various characters
- Yash Mittal as Bittu: Rohan's son
- Nivaan Sen as Brother In Law
- Nadeem Shaikh as Various characters
