= Galipatam =

- Film poster
- Directed by: Naveen Gandhi
- Screenplay by: Sampath Nandi
- Story by: Sampath Nandi
- Produced by: Sampath Nandi; Kiran Muppavarapu; Vijayakumar Vattikuti
- Starring: Aadi; Erica Fernandes; Kristina Akheeva; Rahul Ravindran
- Cinematography: K. Bujji
- Edited by: Rambabu
- Music by: Bheems Ceciroleo
- Production company: Sampath Nandi TeamWorks
- Release date: 8 August 2014
- Running time: 140 mins
- Country: India
- Language: Telugu

Galipatam (English: Kite) is a 2014 Telugu romantic drama film directed by Naveen Gandhi and produced by Sampath Nandi, Kiran Muppavarapu and Vijayakumar Vattikuti. The film stars Aadi, Erica Fernandes and Kristina Akheeva in the lead roles, with actors Rahul Ravindran and Preethi Rana in other prominent roles. The music has been composed by Bheems Ceciroleo. The film was released on 8 August 2014, which received mixed reviews from critics and audiences.

== Plot ==
Karthik and Swathi are a happily married working couple outside the house. They are like friends and fill their responsibilities but not fill love. In a party they reveal that they do not love each other but their past lovers Parineethi and Aarav Reddy, respectively. They both decide to get divorced and go back to their past lovers. Swathi's mother gets a heart attack and the couple decides to pretend to be together. At their anniversary party, swathi's mother reveals that she knows the truth. Few years later, Karthik and Swathi go on a vacation with their kids and respective partners: Karthik & Parineethi and Swathi with Aarav.

== Cast ==
- Aadi as Karthik
- Erica Fernandes as Shwathi, Karthik's wife, Aarav's Lover
- Kristina Akheeva as Parineeti "Paro", Karthik's lover
- Rahul Ravindran as Aarav Reddy
- Bharath Reddy as Ram
- Preethi Rana
- Gayatri Bhargavi as Swetha, wife of Ram
- Chammak Chandra as Karthik's friend
- Posani Krishna Murali as Lawyer

== Soundtrack ==
Galipatam

Soundtrack album by Bheems Ceciroleo
- Released: 12 July 2014
- Recorded: 2014
- Genre: Feature film soundtrack
- Length: 20:13
- Language: Telugu
- Label: Aditya Music
- Producer: Bheems Ceciroleo

Bheems Ceciroleo chronology
Kevvu Keka (2013)	Galipatam (2014)	Joru (2014)

The soundtrack of the film was composed by Bheems Ceciroleo. The soundtrack album was released on 12 July 2014 in Hyderabad.

No.	Title	Lyrics	Artist(s)	Length
1.	"Paani Puri(Dinchaka Dincha)"	Sampath Nandi	Shankar Mahadevan, Bheems Ceciroleo	03:54
2.	"Hey Paaru"	Sirivennela Sitaramasastri	Adnan Sami, Shreya Ghoshal	05:01
3.	"Dhoomapaanam"	Bhaskara Bhatla	Suraj Jagan	03:35
4.	"Tere Mere Saath"	Bhaskara Bhatla	Javed Ali, Shreya Ghoshal	04:22
5.	"Yeh Allah"	bheems	Kailash Kher	04:01
Total length:				20:13

== Critical reception ==
Jeevi of Idlebrain rated the film 3.25/5 and wrote, "On a whole, Gaalipatam is a bold film that is narrated in an interesting way (I still feel that second half should have been handled in a balanced way instead of going in completely emotional mode)." Ranjani Rajendra of The Hindu wrote, "The basic premise of Galipatam is laudable and it takes guts to introduce something as bold. But a little more finesse, a tauter script and fewer random situations might have made it a truly enjoyable watch."

A critic from The Times of India rated the film 2.5/5 stars and wrote, "Should you watch the movie? Not if you want to allow a serpent into your paradise to wreck your marriage by sowing the seeds of divorce in your mind. Stay away. Stay happy." A critic from Sakshi gave the film a mixed review.
