= Yamla Pagla Deewana =

2011 Indian film by Samir Karnik

- Theatrical release poster
- Directed by: Samir Karnik
- Written by: Jasvinder Singh Bath
- Produced by: Nitin Manmohan; Samir Karnik
- Starring: Dharmendra; Sunny Deol; Bobby Deol; Kulraj Randhawa; Anupam Kher; Nafisa Ali; Emma Brown Garett
- Narrated by: Ajay Devgn
- Cinematography: Kabir Lal; Binod Pradhan
- Edited by: Mukesh Thakur
- Music by: Songs: Laxmikant–Pyarelal; Anu Malik; Sandesh Shandilya; Nouman Javaid; RDB; Rahul B. Seth; Score: Sanjoy Chowdhury
- Production companies: One Up Entertainment; Top Angle Productions
- Distributed by: NH Studioz
- Release date: 14 January 2011
- Running time: 162 minutes
- Country: India
- Language: Hindi
- Budget: ₹13 crore
- Box office: ₹88 crore

Yamla Pagla Deewana (transl. Crazy mad lover; Hindi pronunciation: [jəməlaː pəgəlaː d̪iːʋaːnaː]) is a 2011 Indian Hindi-language action comedy film directed by Samir Karnik, featuring Dharmendra, Sunny Deol, and Bobby Deol in the lead roles. The film marks the second pair-up between the Deol family, after Apne (2007). The film's title is inspired by the song "Main Jat Yamla Pagla Deewana" from the 1975 film, Pratigya also starring Dharmendra. The theatrical trailer of the film was unveiled on 5 November 2010, while the film was released on 14 January 2011, and received a good response upon release. It turned out to be a box office hit. It is the first installment of the Yamla Pagla Deewana film series and the 11th highest-grossing Bollywood film of 2011.

== Plot ==
Paramvir Singh is a non-resident Indian (NRI) living happily with his Canadian wife Mary along with his two kids Karam and Veer and his mother in Vancouver, British Columbia, Canada. Years ago, after the birth of Paramvir's younger brother Gajodhar, Paramvir's father, Dharam Singh, had run away from home and taken Gajodhar with him due to difficulties with the family. Back in present, a Canadian comes to visit Paramvir at his home, where he sees Dharam Singh's photo. The Canadian recognises Dharam as a thief who had robbed him when he went to tour in Banaras. Upon hearing this news, Paramvir's mother sends him to Banaras to find his father and younger brother.

When Paramvir reaches Banaras, he meets a youngster who cons him off all his money. Seeking help, Paramvir lands up at a bar, where he sees both Dharam Singh and his brother Gajodhar Singh, who has now grown up. Paramvir realises Gajodhar is in fact the youngster who had earlier conned him and is disappointed to see both his father and brother are con-men. When Paramvir sees Dharam alone, he confronts him and tells him his identity. However, Dharam refuses to acknowledge him as his son. Soon, Paramvir saves Gajodhar from getting attacked by goons, to which Gajodhar befriends him and accepts him to their team, not knowing that he is his elder brother.

During this time, Gajodhar falls in love with Sahiba, a Punjabi author. Dharam and Paramvir help him woo her, and the two start a relationship. Soon enough, Gajodhar gets attacked by Sahiba's brothers, who took Sahiba back to Punjab. When Dharam sees that Gajodhar is hopeless, he breaks down and asks Paramvir to help and acknowledges that he is his father but he shouldn't tell Gajodhar anything about that, after which Paramvir and Gajodhar go to Punjab to get back his love.

Sahiba's elder brother Joginder Singh, who is a cruel landlord of his village, and her other brothers want to marry her to an NRI. Upon hearing this, Paramvir disguises Gajodhar as Punjabi, and they both go to Sahiba's house, with Gajodhar pretending to be an NRI named Karamveer. On the other hand, Joginder has an arch-rival Minty who wants to take Joginder's place and doesn't want Joginder to win in upcoming elections. Joginder, after meeting both of them, decides that they would marry their sister to Paramvir, not to Gajodhar. However, Paramvir is already married. One night, Paramvir gets drunk and beats up Sahiba's brothers, but that only makes Joginder like him more. So Paramvir tells Gajodhar to elope with Sahiba one night.

While they are making their escape, Dharam shows up with a band of musicians, thus preventing Gajodhar and Sahiba from running away because Dharam thinks Gajodhar is the one getting married, not knowing that Sahiba's family has chosen Paramvir. Dharam tells Paramvir and Gajodhar that Paramvir should be the one running away. So Paramvir attempts to go to the market, but Poli brings him back home, causing Joginder to think that Gajodhar and Dharam are joking, as they said Paramvir is scared of marriage, but unbeknownst to Dharam and Gajodhar, he is standing right behind them.

Joginder decides to get Poli married to Gajodhar, after which Gajodhar and Sahiba decide they will escape that very night. Again, they fail as Paramvir's wife Mary shows up with Karam and Veer (Paramvir's sons). Paramvir, Gajodhar, and Dharam make up the story that she is their neighbour in Canada and that her husband is also named Paramvir, who went missing last year. Mary knows that Paramvir is in front of her but chooses not to say anything because it will ruin the whole plan.

Joginder somehow finds out what has been on all this while and gets his men to attack Paramvir, Gajodhar, and Dharam. Paramvir and Dharam beat his men up until Minty and his men showed up. As Minty is about to attack Joginder, Gajodhar rescues him, earning approval to marry Sahiba. In the end, Dharam, Gajodhar, Paramvir, Mary, Sahiba, Karam, and Veer go to Canada, where they live as one happy family.

== Cast ==
- Ajay Devgn as narrator
- Dharmendra as Dharam Singh Dhillon
- Sunny Deol as Paramveer Singh Dhillon / Param – Dharam's elder son
- Bobby Deol as Gajodhar Singh Dhillon / Karamveer – Dharam's younger son, Sahiba's boyfriend and fiancé
- Kulraj Randhawa as Sahiba Kaur Brar – Gajodhar's girlfriend and fiancée
- Nafisa Ali as Mrs. Dhillon – Dharam's wife, Paramveer and Gajodhar's mother
- Emma Brown Garett as Mary Dhillon – Paramveer's wife
- Anupam Kher as Joginder Singh Brar – Sahiba's eldest brother
- Mukul Dev as Gurmit Singh Brar / Billa – Joginder's younger brother, Sahiba's elder brother
- Puneet Issar as Tejpal Singh (Minty)
- Sucheta Khanna as Bholi
- Johny Lever as a Jeweller
- Himanshu Malik as Tejinder (Jarnail)
- Digvijay Rohildas as Balbir (Kaalu)
- Krip Suri as Sukhdev (Kohti)
- Nikunj Pandey as Karam – Paramveer and Mary’s elder son
- Raj as Veer – Paramveer and Mary’s younger son
- Amit Mistry as Binda
- Gurbachchan Singh as Babbu
- Edward Sonnenblick as Bobji
- Lokesh Tilakdhari as Lokesh
- Priyanka Lalwani as Special Role
- Mahek Chahal in an Item Song "Chamki Jawani"
- Madhuri Bhattacharya in an Item Song "Tinku Jiya"

== Production ==
The filming started in February 2010. Director Samir Karnik along with the lead cast of Dharmendra, Sunny Deol and Bobby Deol started shooting in Varanasi in April 2010. The shooting was disrupted twice, first in March, due to the hospitalisation of Dharmendra, and then in July, when Sunny Deol faced back problems while filming an action sequence.

== Reception ==
=== Critical response ===
The film received mostly positive reviews from critics. Taran Adarsh of Bollywood Hungama gave the film 3.5 stars out of 5 saying "it reminds the audience of the films of yesteryear with the typical masala." Gaurav Malani of the Times of India states, "This one is an entertainer and not without a reason". Mayank Shekhar of Hindustan Times rated it 2.5/5. Rajeev Masand of CNN-IBN says "Yamla Pagla Deewana is enjoyable" giving it 2.5 out of 5 stars. Pankaj Sabnani of Glamsham.com gave 3 out of 5 stating "The right dose of action, drama and comedy, combined with a fine story make Yamla Pagla Deewana a paisa vasool entertainer. Go for it!"

=== Box office ===
Yamla Pagla Deewana opened to a good response in India, raking in ₹ 240 million net over its first weekend and approximately ₹ 350 million net at the end of its first week. The film did particularly well in Punjab, Delhi and UP. It grossed approximately ₹ 8.50 crore in its second weekend taking the total gross to ₹ 430 million in ten days. The film had a 300% increase in collections on Republic Day and grossed ₹ 495.0 million by the end of its second week. In its third week, the film collected ₹ 35.1 million. After seven weeks the film's net collections were ₹ 549.3 million. In overseas markets, the film grossed around US$3,030,000. The total worldwide gross of the film amounted to ₹887.2 million.

== Music and soundtrack ==
The music for the film’s songs was composed by Laxmikant–Pyarelal, Anu Malik, Sandesh Shandilya, Nouman Javaid, RDB and Rahul B. Seth. The lyrics of the songs were penned by Anand Bakshi, Dharmendra, Irshad Kamil, Anu Malik, Rahul B. Seth and RDB. The background score of the movie was done by Sanjoy Chowdhury.

"Tinku Jiya" composed by Anu Malik was a chartbuster in 2011. The title song is the remake of the same song from the film Pratigya which was sung by Mohammed Rafi and incidentally featured Dharmendra.

Yamla Pagla Deewana

Soundtrack album by Sandesh Shandilya, Rahul B. Seth, RDB, Nouman Javaid
- Released: 7 December 2010
- Genre: Feature film soundtrack
- Label: T-Series

=== Track listing ===
No.	Title	Lyrics	Music	Performer(s)	Length
1.	"Yamla Pagla Deewana"	RDB, Anand Bakshi	RDB, Laxmikant–Pyarelal	Sonu Nigam, Nindy Kaur	4:31
2.	"Charha De Rang"	Rahul B. Seth, Nouman Javaid	Nouman Javaid	Ali Pervez Mehdi, Shweta Pandit, Mahalakshmi Iyer, Rahul Seth	4:32
3.	"Tinku Jiya"	Anu Malik	Anu Malik	Mamta Sharma, Javed Ali	4:58
4.	"Sau Baar"	Irshad Kamil	Sandesh Shandilya	Shreya Ghoshal, Omer Nadeem	4:12
5.	"Chamki Jawaani"	Anu Malik	Anu Malik	Master Saleem, Mamta Sharma, Daler Mehndi	6:03
6.	"Son Titariya"	Nouman Javaid, Rahul B. Seth	Nouman Javaid, Rahul B. Seth	Krishna Beura	03:52
7.	"Kadd Ke Botal"	Dharmendra	Rahul B. Seth	Sukhwinder Singh	5:03
8.	"Yamla Pagla Deewana" (Remix)	RDB, Anand Bakshi	RDB, Laxmikant-Pyarelal	Parichay, RDB, Nindy Kaur	1:42
9.	"Charha De Rang" (Version 2)	Nouman Javaid	Rahul B. Seth, Nouman Javaid	Rahat Fateh Ali Khan, Shweta Pandit, Mahalakshmi Iyer	4:32
10.	"Charha De Rang" (Pervez Adlib Version)	Rahul B. Seth, Nouman Javaid	Nouman Javaid	Ali Pervez Mehdi	1:50
11.	"Charha De Rang" (Rahat Adlib Version)	Rahul B. Seth, Nouman Javaid	Nouman Javaid	Rahat Fateh Ali Khan	2:07
12.	"Gurbani"	Shri Guru Granth Sahib	Sanjoy Chowdhary	Shahid Mallya	1:09

== Sequel ==
The sequel was announced after the success of the original, and the project began filming in September 2012. The first look of the film was also unveiled after its first schedule was completed also in September 2012. The sequel features the trio of Dharmendra, Sunny Deol and Bobby Deol reprising their roles, with debutant Kristina Akheeva and Neha Sharma as female leads. Yamla Pagla Deewana 2 released on 7 June 2013, and received mixed response but was a box office success. The third installment of the series was released on 31 August 2018 reprising the original lead male actors and Kirti Kharbanda as actress. The film generally received negative reviews and was a box office disaster.

== See also ==
- Yamla Pagla Deewana (film series)
- Yamla Pagla Deewana 2
