= Badal =

2000 Indian film by Raj Kanwar

- Theatrical release poster
- Directed by: Raj Kanwar
- Screenplay by: Sutanu Gupta; Robin Bhatt; Santosh Saroj (dialogues)
- Story by: Raj Kanwar
- Produced by: Salim Akhtar; Shama Akhtar
- Starring: Bobby Deol; Rani Mukerji; Amrish Puri
- Cinematography: Harmeet Singh
- Edited by: Waman Bhonsle
- Music by: Songs: Anu Malik; Background Score: Aadesh Shrivastava
- Production company: Aftab Pictures
- Release date: 11 February 2000
- Running time: 173 minutes
- Country: India
- Language: Hindi
- Budget: ₹10 crore
- Box office: ₹26.91 crore

Badal (transl. Cloud) is a 2000 Indian Hindi-language action thriller film directed by Raj Kanwar. The film stars Bobby Deol and Rani Mukerji in lead roles with Amrish Puri. It was a commercial success.

== Plot ==
Badal is a young man with a tragic childhood. As a child, he had witnessed his entire family, his loving father, mother, and baby sister, murdered in a village massacre by ruthless and corrupt police officer Jaisingh Rana, who kills people for sadistic fun. He is then brought up by his late father's friend Jeetram, who himself is on the run from Rana. Years later, Badal has become a dreaded terrorist working for Jeetram under the name Rajveer, whose main target in life is exacting revenge on Jaisingh Rana for his family's horrible death. In this endeavor, Badal travels to a small town, where he meets a good-natured police officer, ACP Ranjeet Singh, who takes Badal under his wing, and Rani, a bubbly, free-spirited girl who falls madly in love with him. Ranjeet Singh and his wife Simran start considering Badal as their son, and his daughters start to look up to Badal as an elder brother. Through both Singh's family and Rani, Badal is given a new lease of life and comes to understand the values of sentiments, love, and relationships, all of which he has missed out on in his life.

Meanwhile, Rana has now been promoted to DIG but still hasn't changed his old evil ways. He has Jeetram captured and tortured to know the location of his accomplices. Badal frees Jeetram and is pursued by the police force led by Ranjeet Singh. However, Jeetram commits suicide to protect Badal's identity from getting revealed, much to the latter's shock and grief.

== Cast ==
- Bobby Deol as Rajveer / Badal
- Rani Mukerji as Rani
- Amrish Puri as ACP Ranjeet Singh
- Ashutosh Rana as DIG Jai Singh Rana
- Suman Ranganathan (special appearance)
- Mink Brar as Laal Garara (special appearance)
- Mayuri Kango as Soni
- Ashish Vidyarthi as Jeet Ram
- Johnny Lever as Guler Mehndi
- Upasna Singh as Guler Mehndi's wife
- Neena Kulkarni as Simran Singh
- Sana Saeed as Preeti
- Alok Nath as Badal's father
- Kulbhushan Kharbanda as Rani's Grandfather
- Akash Khurana as Minister Satyaprakash Shinde
- Harish Patel as Daya Shankar
- Mushtaq Khan as Police Constable Mangeram
- Vishwajeet Pradhan as Sahab Singh
- Shahbaz Khan (actor) as Aaatankwadi Asgar
- Jeetu Verma as Rafiq
- Dina Pathak
- Salim Ghouse
- Pappu Polyester
- Dinesh Anand
- Mandira Bedi

== Soundtrack ==
Badal

Soundtrack album by Anu Malik
- Released: 4 December 1999
- Genre: Feature film soundtrack
- Length: 48:08
- Label: T-Series
- Producer: Anu Malik

The music for Badal was composed and produced by Anu Malik while the lyrics where penned by Sameer. The film has six original songs, a medley, and one instrumental song, featuring some popular songs like "Yaar Mere Yaaram" and others.

=== Track list ===
Song	Singer(s)	Length
"Jugni Jugni"	Sukhwinder Singh, Jaspinder Narula, Anuradha Paudwal	7:40
"Na Milo Kahin Pyar"	Sonu Nigam, Kavita Krishnamurthy	6:47
"Yaar Yara Mere Yaaram"	Udit Narayan, Anuradha Paudwal	5:40
"Medley Song"	-	5:21
"Allah Allah"	Mukesh Kumar Munna, Dominique, Kavita Krishnamurthy	5:30
"Lal Garara"	Anu Malik, Jaspinder Narula, Sapna Awasthi	6:50
"Tujhe Dekh Ke Dil"	Udit Narayan, Jaspinder Narula	5:33
"Na Milo Kahin Pyar (Instrumental)"	Instrumental	6:47

== Reception ==
Sharmila Taliculam of Rediff.com wrote, "A word of warning before you watch this film -- for the sake of your sanity, leave your brains behind. There are so many things here that don't make sense."
