= Sucheta Khanna =

Indian TV and film actress

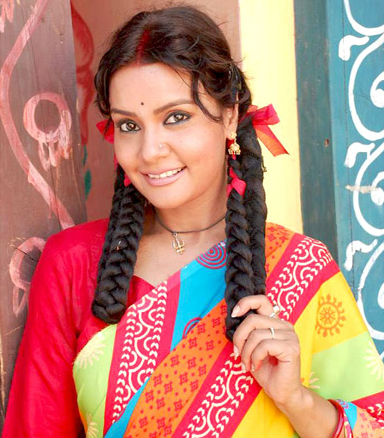
- Khanna in 2012
- Born: Sucheta Paushe; Pune, Maharashtra, India
- Occupation: Actress
- Years active: 1995–present

Sucheta Khanna is an Indian actress who primarily works in Hindi films and television. Khanna is best known for her portrayal of Indumati Gupta in Lapataganj. Her other notable roles were in the shows Ghunghat Ke Pat Khol, Gharana, Shubh Mangal Savadhan, Hari Mirchi Lal Mirchi, Woh Toh Hai Albelaa and Pocket Mein Aasman.

== Career ==
Khanna has worked in detective serial Karamchand (2007) and then in Hari Mirchi Lal Mirchi a comedy serial telecast by DD National. She played the role of Indumati in the Sony SAB comedy series Lapataganj who is the wife of Mukundilal Gupta. She played the role of Pinky on the same channel Sony SAB in the show Peterson Hill as the wife of Kishorilal Chaddha, a stationmaster. She also played the role of Bijli in Jijaji Chhat Parr Koii Hai as the wife of Jamvant Jindal.

She played the role of Elina in Malayalam film Kakkakuyil along with Mohanlal and Mukesh. She played the role of Poli in the 2011 comic caper Yamla Pagla Deewana. She also had a guest appearance, as Sapna in Anjaana Anjaani and in Sandwich. She returned in Yamla Pagla Deewana 2 in 2013 playing Babli. She played the main role of Kokila Keshav Kulkarni in the show Shrimaan Shrimati Phir Se, a reboot of popular 90s show Shriman Shrimati. She appeared in the show Woh Toh Hai Albelaa in 2023.

== Filmography ==
=== Films ===
- All films are in Hindi unless otherwise noted.

Year	Film	Role	Notes	Ref.
1998	Zor	Shabana Khan		
2001	Kakkakuyil	Elina	Malayalam film	
2001	Kasoor	Shalini		
2006	Sandwich	Film actress		
2010	Anjaana Anjaani	Sapna		
2011	Yamla Pagla Deewana	Bholi Kaur Brar		
2013	Yamla Pagla Deewana 2	Babli		
2015	Prem Ratan Dhan Payo	Sardarni		

=== Television ===
Year	Film	Role	Notes	Ref.
1999	Ghunghat Ke Pat Khol		Television film	
2001–2003	Gharana	Suman Kothari Somani		
2002–2004	Shubh Mangal Savadhan	Julie Mehra		
2003	Vishwaas	Siya Pradhan Dikshit		
2004	Bhagwan Bachaye Inko			
2006	Kadvee Khattee Meethi	Madhu Verma		
2007	Karamchand	Kitty		
2007–2009	Hari Mirchi Lal Mirchi	Ritu Khanna		
2009	Comedy Circus – Chinchpokli To China	Contestant		
2009–2014	Lapataganj	Indumati "Indu" Gupta		
2015	Peterson Hill	Pinky Chaddha		
2016	Darr Sabko Lagta Hai	—N/a	Episode: "Gudda"	
2017–2019	Meri Hanikarak Biwi	Pushpa Dwivedi Pandey		
2018	Shrimaan Shrimati Phir Se	Kokila Kulkarni		
2020	Excuse Me Maadam	Kranti Harjaayi		
2021	Jijaji Chhat Parr Koii Hai	Bijli Devi Jindal		
2021	Aapki Nazron Ne Samjha	Toral Rawal		
2022–2023	Woh Toh Hai Albelaa	Indrani Sharma		
2023–2024	Har Bahu Ki Yahi Kahani Sasumaa Ne Meri Kadar Na Jaani	Babli Devi Shastri		
2025	Pocket Mein Aasman	Narayani Gandhi		
2026	Office Office - Chali Mussaddi Ki Beti	Pyaari Lal		
