= Chor Machaaye Shor =

- Theatrical release poster
- Directed by: David Dhawan
- Written by: Anwar Khan (dialogues)
- Screenplay by: Yunus Sajawal
- Story by: Shanawaz Ahmed
- Produced by: Sanjiv Tolani; Rajiv Tolani
- Starring: Bobby Deol; Shilpa Shetty; Bipasha Basu; Paresh Rawal; Om Puri; Ashish Vidyarthi
- Cinematography: Harmeet Singh
- Edited by: David Dhawan
- Music by: Anu Malik
- Production company: Geeta Enterprises
- Release date: 2002
- Running time: 145 minutes
- Country: India
- Language: Hindi
- Budget: ₹8.50 crore
- Box office: ₹13.62 crore

Chor Machaaye Shor (transl. Thief Makes Noise) is a 2002 Indian Hindi-language action comedy film directed by David Dhawan starring Bobby Deol, Shilpa Shetty, and Bipasha Basu as the leads while Paresh Rawal, Om Puri, Rajat Bedi, and Rajpal Yadav play supporting roles. The plot of the film is based on the 1999 Hollywood film Blue Streak (which itself is a remake of the 1965 British film The Big Job).

== Plot ==
Shyam is a small-time thief who works as a security guard at a museum. He devises a plan with his three friends, Johnny, Titu Pinto and Tony Pinto, to steal a Nizam diamond. After successfully stealing it, Shyam double-crosses the Pinto Brothers and escapes with Johnny. Although Johnny gets away, Shyam is apprehended, but not before hiding the diamond in an air duct in a dilapidated building. He is sentenced to two years in prison.

Upon his release, Shyam returns to retrieve the diamond, only to discover that a new police headquarters has been built on the site of the old building. To gain access, he impersonates a police inspector named Ram. His apparent heroism attracts the attention of ACP Ranbir Singh, while Inspector Charan Pandey repeatedly suspects that Ram is not who he claims to be. Ram also begins a romance with Inspector Ranjita Basu. Meanwhile, Shyam struggles to locate the diamond while maintaining his cover, which forces him to deal with criminals, including Kalia Anthony and his former friend Johnny. Before Johnny is arrested, he addresses Ram as Shyam, arousing Pandey's suspicions.

To explain the inconsistencies, Shyam claims that he is Ram's troublesome twin brother. Ranbir takes it upon himself to reform Shyam, forcing him to juggle his identities as Inspector Ram and Shyam, who works as Ranbir's driver. He also romances Ranbir's daughter, Kajal. Shyam's friend Guru disguises himself as their mother to sustain the deception, while Pandey remains suspicious and Ranbir stays oblivious to the truth.

Meanwhile, Titu and Tony learn that Shyam has been released from prison and discover that the diamond is hidden somewhere inside the police headquarters. Disguised as tea vendors, they threaten Shyam, but he fights back and drives them away. Shyam and his associates then devise a scheme to convince Ranbir that doppelgangers exist. They claim that Ranbir has a double named Raghuswamy Muthuswamy Yadurappa Iyer, a wanted drug smuggler.

Kajal is the only person who discovers Shyam's true identity, but Ranbir eventually uncovers the deception and becomes furious. Unbeknownst to Shyam, Titu and Tony locate the real Raghuswamy and threaten him into impersonating Ranbir, hoping to make stealing the diamond easier. Shyam discovers their plan and thwarts it. He escapes with the diamond and reaches a car dealership, pursued by Titu and Tony. A fight breaks out, but the police arrive and attempt to arrest all three men. Johnny then appears and seemingly shoots Shyam, who retaliates by shooting Johnny. Both appear to die, while Titu and Tony are arrested. However, Pandey's suspicions lead him to discover that the gun was fake, revealing that neither Shyam nor Johnny has actually killed the other.

At the airport, Pandey and Ranbir bid farewell to Kajal, who is travelling to London. They are approached by three Sikhs, who are revealed to be Guru, Shyam and Johnny in disguise, confirming that both men survived the shooting. Pandey again suspects Shyam and refuses to believe that twins exist. However, he briefly encounters his own doppelganger, a Punjabi tourist, turning the tables on him.

The film ends with Shyam, still disguised as a Sikh, giving Kajal a diamond ring, revealing that she is going to London to marry him.

== Cast ==
- Bobby Deol as Inspector Ram Singh / Shyam Singh
- Shilpa Shetty as Kajal Ranbir Singh
- Bipasha Basu as Inspector Ranjita
- Paresh Rawal as ACP Ranbir Dharambir Singh / Raghuswami Muthuswamy Yadurappa Iyer (dual role)
- Om Puri as Inspector Charan Pandey / Sandhu
- Ashish Vidyarthi as Tito Pinto
- Rajat Bedi as Tony Pinto
- Rajpal Yadav as Johnny
- Shekhar Suman as Guru, Shayam's friend / Vaijayanti Ram's mother / Mala
- Razak Khan Kala Anthony

== Soundtrack ==
Chor Machaaye Shor

Soundtrack album by Anu Malik
- Released: 13 July 2002
- Genre: Feature film soundtrack
- Label: T-Series

Music by Anu Malik.

1. "Kaan Ke Neeche" - Vinod Rathod, Anuradha Sriram
2. "Aankhein Hain Teri" - Udit Narayan, Dimple Verma
3. "Chor Machaaye Shor" - Sonu Nigam
4. "Chadh Gayi Chadh Gayi" - Sonu Nigam, Anuradha Sriram
5. "Ishqan Ishqan" - Karsan Sargathiya, Sunidhi Chauhan, Adnan Sami
6. "Tum Tata Ho Ya Birla" - Vinod Rathod, Anuradha Sriram

== Critical response ==
Taran Adarsh of Bollywood Hungama gave the film 1 star out of 5, writing ″Bobby Deol gives his all to this role and seems comfortable in light scenes. Shekhar Suman gets into several get-ups, but he entertains most as Bobby's mother. Shilpa Shetty gets no scope to perform but dances exceptionally well. Bipasha Basu is wasted. Paresh Rawal is just about okay. Om Puri is competent. Ashish Vidyarthi and Rajat Bedi lend passable support. Rajpal Yadav impresses. On the whole, CHOR MACHAAYE SHOR stands on a weak foundation ? its script. Despite impressive names on and off screen, the film has precious little to impress an avid cinegoer. Priyanka Bhattacharya of Rediff.com wrote ″Chor Machaaye Shor is a typical Bollywood masala potboiler with fun, romance, music and mandatory dishum-dishum. But if you are attuned to and enjoy David Dhawan's brand of humour, then this one is a barrel of laughs.″
