= Barsaat (1995 film) =

1995 Indian film by Rajkumar Santoshi

- Theatrical release poster
- Directed by: Rajkumar Santoshi
- Screenplay by: Rajkumar Santoshi
- Dialogues by: Rajkumar Santoshi; Shyam Gupta
- Story by: Rajkumar Santoshi
- Produced by: Dharmendra
- Starring: Bobby Deol; Twinkle Khanna; Danny Denzongpa; Raj Babbar; Mukesh Khanna
- Cinematography: Santosh Sivan
- Edited by: V. N. Mayekar
- Music by: Score: Louis Banks; Songs: Nadeem–Shravan
- Production company: Vijayta Films
- Distributed by: Vijayta Films
- Release date: 6 October 1995
- Running time: 170 minutes
- Country: India
- Language: Hindi
- Budget: ₹8.25 crore
- Box office: ₹37.23 crore

Barsaat (transl. Rain) is a 1995 Indian Hindi-language romantic action film directed by Rajkumar Santoshi and produced by Dharmendra. It starred debutants Bobby Deol and Twinkle Khanna, supported by Danny Denzongpa, Raj Babbar and Mukesh Khanna.

Both Deol and Khanna won the award for Filmfare Award for Best Male Debut and Filmfare Award for Best Female Debut, respectively. The film was a major commercial success. Deol would go on to act in a film of the same name 10 years later, but with a different subject.

== Plot ==
At first Badal is a naive but intelligent young man who comes from a small village to the big city to attend college. He is introduced to city life by his former villager Damru, who calls himself Danny. In college, he meets pretty and precocious Tina Oberoi and after a few misunderstandings and misadventures, they fall in love.

This relationship is not approved of by Tina's wealthy widower step-father Dinesh Oberoi, who hopes to take all her wealth. He is waiting for Tina To turn eighteen. His friend wants his son to marry Tina and divide the whole wealth. Once his son finds out about love of Tina and Badal, he complains to the college principal, that Badal has been responsible for sexually harassing a girl at the college one night, but Tina testifies in favour of Badal and insists he's innocent. Dinesh then asks a corrupt cop, Negi, the city's assistant commissioner of police, for assistance.

Negi arrests Badal on trumped-up charges and imprisons him. Badal's widowed dad Bhairon comes to the big city to try to make sense of why Badal is in prison. Dinesh gives a contract to Negi to have Badal killed. Negi agrees and hires a gang of ruthless outlaws to hunt and kill Badal. The lovebirds run away to Badal's village. However, Negi reaches there and threatens the villagers. To save the villagers, Badal gives Tina sleeping pills by lying to her that both of them are committing suicide. He then surrenders himself to Negi.

When Tina wakes up, she finds herself in the custody of her step-father who tries to kill her by giving her poison, but her friend tells her the true intention of Dinesh who never wanted Tina to marry his son. She is shocked to learn the truth and runs in a car.

By this time, Badal and Negi had a face off where Negi is apparently killed by Badal and now he comes to save Tina from Dinesh who is behind her to kill him. Both of them are fighting on the hill where Tina pleads Badal not to kill Dinesh as she considers him her father.

However, Negi (who is revealed to still be alive) again comes to kill Badal, but Dinesh, who manages to protect Badal, gets critically injured by Negi. Negi is finally killed by Bhairon and men. At last, Tina and Badal unite with the dying Dinesh, who finally approves their match and apologises for his deeds.

== Cast ==
- Bobby Deol as Badal – Tina's boyfriend
- Twinkle Khanna as Tina Oberoi – Badal's girlfriend
- Danny Denzongpa as ACP Negi
- Raj Babbar as Dinesh Oberoi – Tina's step-father
- Mukesh Khanna as Bhairon – Badal's father
- Harish Patel as Damru "Danny" – Badal's friend
- Bharat Kapoor as R.K. Mehra – Dinesh's associate
- Anjan Srivastav as Maula Ram
- Ashwin Kaushal as Bhushi
- Vijay Kashyap as Kapurchand Dinesh College principal
- Viju Khote as Tom Tom
- Shehzad Khan as Khan Bhai
- Suresh Bhagwat as Director
- Kiran Juneja (guest appearance) as Tina's late mother, Dinesh's late wife
- Ajit Singh Deol (friendly appearance) as Train driver
- Asha Sachdev (guest appearance) as Dinesh's lover

== Production ==
Initially, Shekhar Kapur was set to direct the film and had shot a scene with Deol. However, he left the film for Bandit Queen and Rajkumar Santoshi took over as director. He had both the lead actors attend workshops. While shooting a scene in London, Deol suffered a leg injury and had to use crutches for over a year. He continued shooting for the film Gupt: The Hidden Truth with his injured leg. A few scenes were shot at Rohtang Pass near Manali, Himachal Pradesh. Khanna fainted once while filming there. Reportedly both the lead actors did not go along well during the shooting. Deol irritated Khanna on many occasions and the latter found it "obnoxious". It was the costliest Indian film ever made until then and remains the first and only time to date that such a film was made with newcomers.

== Box office ==
Released on 210 screens in India, Barsaat opened to an excellent response, earning ₹58 lakh on first day. By the end of its run, it did a worldwide business of ₹37.23 crore to emerge a superhit at the box office.

== Music and soundtrack ==
Barsaat

Studio album by Nadeem Shravan
- Released: 1995
- Recorded: 1995
- Genre: Feature film soundtrack
- Length: 58:39
- Label: Tips Industries
- Producer: Nadeem Shravan

Nadeem Shravan chronology
Saajan Ki Baahon Mein (1995)	Barsaat (1995)	Anokha Andaaz (1995)

The background score of Barsaat was composed by Louis Banks. The music for the songs was composed by Nadeem–Shravan and lyrics of the songs were penned by Sameer.

According to the Indian trade website Box Office India, with around 3,000,000 units sold the soundtrack became the fourth highest-selling album of the year. The soundtrack was very popular, especially the tracks – "Humko Sirf Tumse Pyar Hai", "Love Tujhe Love Main" and "Nahin Yeh Ho Nahin Sakta".

#	Title	Singer(s)	Length
1.	"Humko Sirf Tumse Pyar Hai"	Kumar Sanu, Alka Yagnik	06:49
2.	"Love Tujhe Love Main"	Kumar Sanu, Alka Yagnik	05:46
3.	"Dil Paagal Deewana"	Kumar Sanu	05:49
4.	"Ek Haseen Ladki Se"	Sonu Nigam, Alka Yagnik	08:34
5.	"Ishq Mein Ek Pal"	Sonu Nigam, Kavita Krishnamurthy	08:16
6.	"Nahin Yeh Ho Nahin Sakta"	Kumar Sanu, Sadhana Sargam	06:04
7.	"Humko Padhayi Se Kya"	Kumar Sanu	06:41
8.	"Humko Sirf Tumse Pyar Hai"	(Instrumental)	05:44
9.	"Love Tujhe Love Main"	(Instrumental)	05:12

== Reception ==
Barsaat was a "hugely-anticipated film". Writing for Rediff.com, Sukanya Verma called it "not a great movie" but was appreciative of Santosh Sivan's cinematography, especially during the song "Nahi Yeh Ho Nahi Sakta", noting that the "freshness enveloping Sivan’s visuals in the song ... choreographed by Farah Khan, continues to satisfy" and "I love the luminously lit frames, the use of fresh paint and mirrors and a gorgeous play of pristine white and bright yellow." A review in India Today noted that the film lacked a script and is "yet another collection of cliches". It found the songs "mediocre" and concluded with "[t]he best part is that two stars are born".

== Awards and nominations ==
=== Filmfare Awards ===
- Best Male Debut - Bobby Deol (Won)
- Best Female Debut - Twinkle Khanna (Won)
- Best Cinematographer - Santosh Sivan (Won)
- Best Sound - Rakesh Ranjan (Won)
- Best Performance in a Negative Role - Danny Denzongpa (Nominated)

== See also ==
- List of Bollywood films of 1995
