= Class of '83 =

2020 Indian film by Atul Sabharwal

- Netflix release poster
- Directed by: Atul Sabharwal
- Written by: Abhijeet Deshpande
- Based on: The Class of 83 by Hussain Zaidi
- Produced by: Gauri Khan; Gaurav Verma
- Starring: Bobby Deol
- Cinematography: Mario Poljac
- Edited by: Manas Mittal
- Music by: Viju Shah
- Production company: Red Chillies Entertainment
- Distributed by: Netflix
- Release date: 21 August 2020
- Running time: 98 minutes
- Country: India
- Language: Hindi

Class of '83 is a 2020 Indian Hindi-language crime thriller film produced by Red Chillies Entertainment and directed by Atul Sabharwal for Netflix. The film is based on the book "The Class of 83" and tells the story of a hero policeman shunted to a punishment posting as the dean of the police academy. The film premiered on 21 August 2020 on Netflix.

At the 2021 Filmfare OTT Awards, Class of '83 received 2 nominations – Best Actor in a Web Original Film (Bobby Deol) and Best Supporting Actor in a Web Original Film (Bhupendra Jadawat).

== Plot ==
A hero policeman shunted to a punishment posting as the Dean of the police academy decides to punish the corrupt bureaucracy and its criminal allies in return by training five lethal assassin policemen. But, like all good plans, it only works for a while until the fire that he has ignited threatens to burn his own house down.

— Netflix

Class of 83, which is based on a book authored by leading crime journalist Hussain Zaidi, is set in Bombay in the 1980s when the underworld’s stranglehold on the city was becoming hard to break. Dozens of young men rendered jobless as a result of the ongoing mill strike were being lured into joining local gangs, and the nexus between powerful politicians and criminal gang leaders made it hard for the police to weed out the problem. With this as the backdrop, the film follows an ideological cop-turned-trainer who moulds five cadets into encounter specialists.

Yanked off the field for doing his job with more integrity than those in power would like him to, upright officer Vijay Singh (Bobby Deol) lands a ‘punishment posting’ as the dean of the Police Training Centre in Nashik. Convinced that the only way to restore order in a flawed system is to fix it from the inside, he handpicks a clutch of bold young officers and trains them to bend the law in service of the greater good.

Inspired from real accounts of the city’s first encounter specialists, the film depicts how the officers shrewdly planned and executed hits while staying within the system and following all necessary protocols. But then it quickly slips into a predictable rise-and-fall-and-rise narrative with egos and corruption breaking up the friends, and a last-ditch shot at redemption triggered by their mentor.

== Cast ==
- Bobby Deol as Additional Director General of Police Officer Vijay Singh, the husband of Sudha Singh
- Bhupendra Jadawat as Pramod Shukla
- Geetika Tyagi as Sudha Singh, the wife of Vijay Singh.
- Anup Soni as CM Manohar Patkar
- Joy Sengupta as DGP Raghav Desai
- Vishwajeet Pradhan as Mangesh Dixit
- Hans Dev Sharma as YP Mathur
- Hitesh Bhojraj as Vishnu Varde
- Sameer Paranjape as Aslam Khan
- Ninad Mahajani as Laxman Jadhav
- Prithvik Pratap as Janardan Surve
- Spruha Joshi as Pramod Shukla's wife

== Production ==
The filming began in the first week of May 2019.

== Release ==
Class of '83 was streamed on OTT Platform Netflix from 21 August 2020.

== Reception ==
On the review aggregator website Rotten Tomatoes, 17% of 12 critics' reviews are positive. Shubhra Gupta of The Indian Express gave the film 3 out of 5, writing, "Class of ‘83 works both as a well-realised if a trifle sketchy hark-back at an interesting epoch, as well as an entertainer. Though we’ve seen so many iterations of the gangsters vs honest law enforcers in the movies, there’s always room for another. Especially because we need stories of cops who believe in their motto of ‘protect the good and destroy the evil’, today more than ever."

Conversely, Saibal Chatterjee of NDTV gave the film 2.5 out of 5, writing, "Despite Bobby Deol's unfussy impersonation of a stolid, righteous policeman, the film is more tattle than tension, more acrimony than action."

== Accolades ==
Year	Award ceremony	Category	Nominee / work	Result	Ref.
2021	Filmfare OTT Awards	Best Actor in a Web Original Film	Bobby Deol	Nominated	
2021	Filmfare OTT Awards	Best Supporting Actor in a Web Original Film	Bhupendra Jadawat	Nominated	
