= Yamla Pagla Deewana 2 =

2013 Indian film by Sangeeth Sivan

- Theatrical release poster
- Directed by: Sangeeth Sivan
- Screenplay by: Jasvinder Singh Bath
- Story by: Lynda Deol
- Produced by: Dharmendra; Sunny Deol
- Starring: Dharmendra; Sunny Deol; Bobby Deol; Kristina Akheeva; Neha Sharma; Annu Kapoor; Anupam Kher; Aidan Cook; Johnny Lever; Sucheta Khanna
- Narrated by: Ajay Devgn
- Cinematography: Neha Parti Matiyani
- Edited by: Chirag Jain
- Music by: Songs: Shaarib–Toshi; Score: Raju Singh
- Production companies: Sunny Sounds; Stellar Films; YPD Films UK
- Distributed by: Sunny Sounds
- Release date: 7 June 2013
- Running time: 154 minutes
- Country: India
- Language: Hindi

Yamla Pagla Deewana 2 (transl. Crazy Mad Lover 2; Hindi pronunciation: [jəməlaː pəgəlaː diːʋaːnaː]) is a 2013 Indian Hindi-language action comedy film directed by Sangeeth Sivan. It is a sequel to the 2011 film, Yamla Pagla Deewana and the second installment of the Yamla Pagla Deewana film series.

It stars Dharmendra, Sunny Deol, Bobby Deol, Kristina Akheeva and Neha Sharma in the lead roles, supported by Annu Kapoor, Anupam Kher, Aidan Cook, Johnny Lever and Sucheta Khanna. This was Russian-Australian actress Kristina Akheeva's debut movie.

The story of the film was written by Sunny's wife Lynda Deol. The film's theatrical trailer was released on 27 March 2013 on YouTube, and its music rights were acquired by Yash Raj Films. Yamla Pagla Deewana 2 was released on 7 June 2013.

== Plot ==
Yamla Pagla Deewana 2 reunites the Dhillon family trio – the con-artist father Dharam Singh, his young son Gajodhar Singh, and his elder son Paramveer Singh.

The story begins in Banaras, where Dharam and Gajodhar are running a phony baba (spiritual guru) scam, conning locals by having Dharam pose as a fake guru, "Yamla baba". Their latest target is a wealthy NRI businessman from England, Sir Yograj Khanna, whom they mistakenly believe to be a millionaire. Dharam hatches a plan for Gajodhar to woo Khanna's beautiful daughter, Suman, and inherit his fortune. To swindle Khanna, they impersonate sophisticated businessmen and arrange a match between Gajodhar and Suman. They travel to London, where they run into Paramveer, who is now a successful loan recovery agent for a bank. Param is initially thrilled to see his family, believing they have turned over a new leaf, only to be horrified to find his father and brother still engaged in their crooked ways.

Param was previously hired by Yograj Khanna as his new manager after single-handedly protecting Khanna's club from a notorious gangster named Joginder "Dude" Armstrong. It is at an engagement party for Gajodhar and Suman that Param first meets Reet, Khanna's second daughter, who works in an art gallery. The meeting sparks an instant connection, and Param quickly falls in love with the sophisticated art-lover. Their attraction begins to deepen, but the course of true love hits a major snag when Dharam and Gajodhar discover that Khanna's elder daughter, Suman, is adopted and that the rightful heir to his wealth is his younger, biological daughter, Reet.

To switch their target from Suman to Reet, Dharam introduces a new layer to the scam: a twin brother for Prem named 'Q Oberoi', a celebrated abstract painter. Q's artistic efforts are saved by the intervention of Einstein, a highly intelligent pet orangutan belonging to their absentee landlord, Gyanprakash (a follower of Yamla Baba), who secretly paints a brilliant, tear-inducing masterpiece that Q passes off as his own. Reet, fascinated by art, is immediately drawn to the paintings of enigmatic 'Q'.

The deception continues, leading to an emotional scene between Param and Reet at a party. A drunk Param, frustrated by his family's persistent lies and Reet's infatuation with 'Q', attempts to reveal Q's true identity but is interrupted by a fight with Armstrong's goons. Nonetheless, Reet has already fallen in love with Param, but she wants the shy Param to propose to her. Hoping to make Param propose to her, Reet visits his house but finds another girl sleeping beside him (a setup by Dharam to frame Param), which leaves her in tears. Heartbroken, Reet agrees to marry the fake artist Q. Param, determined to stop the fraud and win Reet back, proposes a joint wedding, which is opposed by Dharam.

Meanwhile, Gajodhar genuinely falls in love with Suman, who loves him regardless of his identity. When Gajodhar and Dharam finally have a moment of conscience and try to confess the truth, they, along with the Khanna family, are kidnapped by Dude Armstrong and his cronies. Param rescues everyone from Dude and his henchmen. With the truth revealed, Gajodhar and Suman realize their genuine love for each other, and Param finally proposes to Reet, who happily accepts. The family's chaotic and convoluted adventure concludes with both couples – Reet and Param, and Suman and Gajodhar – united.

== Cast ==
Actor	Role	Description
Dharmendra	Dharam Singh Dhillon/Yamla baba/Dharam Oberoi	Paramveer and Gajodhar's father
Sunny Deol	Paramveer Singh Dhillon/Param	Gajodhar's elder brother, Reet's boyfriend and fiancé
Bobby Deol	Gajodhar Singh Dhillon/Prem Oberoi/Q Oberoi	Param's younger brother, Suman's boyfriend and fiancé
Kristina Akheeva	Reet Khanna	Suman's younger sister, Param's girlfriend and fiancée
Neha Sharma	Suman Khanna	Reet's elder sister, Gajodhar's girlfriend and fiancée
Annu Kapoor	Sir Yograj Khanna	Reet's father, Suman's adoptive father
Anupam Kher	Joginder Singh Brar/Dude/Armstrong	Crime boss
Aidan Cook	Einstein	Gyanprakash's pet orangutan
Johnny Lever	Bunty	Joginder's henchman
Sucheta Khanna	Babli	Joginder's henchwoman
Mukul Dev	Gyanprakash	Yamla baba's follower
Arjun	Inspector	Police officer in London
Triptii Dimri	Dancer	In the title track "Yamla Pagla Deewana"
Gulnaaz Khan	Dancer	In the song "Main Taan Aidaan Hi Nachna"

== Music and soundtrack ==
Yamla Pagla Deewana 2

Soundtrack album by Shaarib–Toshi
- Released: 2013
- Recorded: 2013
- Genre: Feature film soundtrack
- Length: 28:19
- Language: Hindi; Punjabi
- Label: YRF Music

The film's songs were composed by brothers Shaarib–Toshi except for the promo track "Main Taan Aida Hi Nachna", which was composed by Sachin Gupta. The lyrics of the songs were penned by Kumaar. The background score of the movie was done by Raju Singh.

=== Track listing ===
No.	Title	Singer(s)	Length
1.	"Yamla Pagla Deewana"	Sukhwinder Singh, Shankar Mahadevan, Rahul Seth, Sanchita Bhattacharya	3:54
2.	"Changli Hai Changli Hai"	Mika Singh, Shreya Ghoshal	3:29
3.	"Suit Tera Laal Rang Da"	Sonu Nigam, Sunidhi Chauhan	4:22
4.	"Main Taan Aidaan Hi Nachna"	Diljit Dosanjh, Dharmendra, Sunny Deol, Bobby Deol, Karan Deol, Sachin Gupta	3:34
5.	"Jatt Yamla Pagla Ho Gaya"	Mika Singh, Suzanne D'Mello	2:56
6.	"Sadi Daru Da Pani" (YPD version)	Toshi Sabri, Sanchita Bhattacharya, Rahul Seth	3:57
7.	"Jatt Yamla Pagla Ho Gaya" (version)	Shaarib Sabri, Suzanne D'Mello	2:57
8.	"YPD2 - Mash Up"	Sukhwinder Singh, Shankar Mahadevan, Sonu Nigam, Mika Singh, Sunidhi Chauhan, Shreya Ghoshal	3:10
Total length:			28:19

== Production ==
A sequel to Yamla Pagla Deewana was announced after the success of the original, and it began filming in September 2012. Yamla Pagla Deewana 2 was produced by Dharmendra and his production company, YPD Films UK, and distributed by Sunny Sounds. Online promotion was by Yash Raj Films, with its trailer and song promos uploaded to the YRF YouTube channel.

=== Filming ===
UK locations were in Leicester, Birmingham and London, with filming beginning on 17 September 2012 in Leicester.

=== Development ===
After the success of Yamla Pagla Deewana, Dharmendra announced a sequel. When the original director Samir Karnik could not do the sequel, Sangeeth Sivan agreed to direct. Sunny Deol's son, Karan, was assistant director. In January 2013 shooting began in Mandav, Maheshwar and Indore, Madhya Pradesh.

== Critical reception ==
Yamla Pagla Deewana 2 received mixed to positive reviews. The Times of India gave the film 2.5 out of 5 stars and said, "On the upside, a very attractive Sunny stays this movie's brave heart." Filmfare gave it four out of five stars: "YPD2 gets two things right. The first is Sunny Deol's performance. He's a Super Sardar in the movie. He's continuing where he left off in Border, Gadar and YPD. He can beat up an army all alone. Only this time he has a supersonic roar, he massacres a whole legion of Ninjas, battles gigantic Sumo wrestlers and lifts a goddamn truck with one hand. The self-deprecating humour and parody with Sunny is hilarious. The other good thing is the use of a painting as a humour motif. Everyone seems to break into tears of disbelief and awe on seeing this painting. Funny thing is, it's painted by the man in the monkey suit, while he's piss drunk and has used his bum as a paint brush."

Sukanya Verma of Rediff.com called it an unimaginative, tedious film. Karan Anshuman of Mumbai Mirror rated the film 1.5 out of 5, IBN Live gave the film two out of five stars: "Rarely do we see contemporary actors giving tribute to each other. The stature of Salman Khan is celebrated in #YPD2. It's a pity the jokes run out faster than your popcorn does."

== See also ==
- Yamla Pagla Deewana (film series)
- Yamla Pagla Deewana: Phir Se
