= Yamla Pagla Deewana: Phir Se =

2018 Indian film by Navaniat Singh

- Theatrical release poster
- Directed by: Navaniat Singh
- Screenplay by: Dheeraj Rattan
- Dialogues by: Bunty Rathore
- Story by: Dheeraj Rattan
- Produced by: Kamayani Punia Sharma; Ginny Khanuja; Aarushi Malhotra; Dhaval Jayantilal Gada; Aksshay Jayantilal Gada
- Starring: Dharmendra; Shatrughan Sinha (special appearance); Sunny Deol; Bobby Deol; Kriti Kharbanda; Binnu Dhillon; Asrani
- Narrated by: Salman Khan
- Cinematography: Jitan Harmeet Singh
- Edited by: Manish More
- Music by: Songs: Sachet–Parampara; Vishal Mishra; Sanjeev–Darshan; D Soldierz; Score: Raju Singh
- Production companies: Sunny Sounds; Intercut Entertainment; Pen Studios
- Distributed by: Pen Studios; Soham Rockstar; Zee Studios International; Reliance Entertainment
- Release date: 31 August 2018
- Running time: 148 minutes
- Country: India
- Language: Hindi
- Budget: ₹36 crore
- Box office: ₹15 crore

Yamla Pagla Deewana: Phir Se (transl. Crazy mad lover: Once again; Hindi pronunciation: [jəməla pəgəla d̪iːʋaːna pʰɪɾ seː]) is a 2018 Indian Hindi-language action comedy film directed by Navaniat Singh. After the success of Yamla Pagla Deewana and Yamla Pagla Deewana 2, this was the third and final installment of Yamla Pagla Deewana film series. The film stars Dharmendra, Sunny Deol, Bobby Deol and Kriti Kharbanda in lead roles, supported by Binnu Dhillon, Mohan Kapoor and Asrani.

The film had its worldwide theatrical release on 31 August 2018 to generally negative reviews from critics. Unlike the box office success of the first two films in the series, this third instalment bombed at the box office.

== Plot ==
The film revolves around 2 brothers namely Puran and Kala. They live in Amritsar, Punjab where Puran manages the old Dawakhana of his ancestors based on Ayurveda. Kala is a notorious younger brother who wants to earn money, contradictory to Puran who wants to spread the cheaper way of medication rather than commercialization by private pharmaceutical companies. Marfatia Pharmaceuticals is one such company that offers a huge sum of money in turn for the process of making Vajrakavach, the ayurvedic remedy that cures all illnesses. He instantly rejects Marfatia's offer and punches him, causing him to bleed and he plans on taking revenge on Puran. Jaywant Parmar is an elderly Lawyer living as the tenant in Puran and Kala's house. He has been paying only Rs. 115 as monthly rent for more than 35 years and annoys Kala a lot. He is also an admirer of angels and sees a lot of Angels (Apsara) who no one can see.

A surgeon from Gujarat named Chiku is a carefree girl who drinks and parties. She wants to have a clinic of her own someday. She decides to go to Punjab to study Ayurveda under Puran. Instead, after a series of twists and turns, it is revealed that Marfatia sent her to steal the Vajrakavach. She steals the old manuscripts for the process of making Vajrakavach while everyone is at an engagement party. She leaves for Gujarat and Kala, who has fallen for her, tries to keep contact with her, but fails.

Marfatia now sends a legal notice to Puran as he has now patented the Vajrakavach and renamed it the Cure Medicine. Puran, now left to battle Marfatia, contacts Parmar. They all agree and go to Gujarat and live in the same colony, unknowingly where Chiku also lives. The colony, which hates Punjabis, starts to like Puran as he cures an incurable girl with poor eyesight.

During the lawsuit, the judge is revealed to be an old friend of Parmar's, Sunil Sinha. After 2 dates, Marfatia offers Parmar 10 crores and Parmar agrees. He and Kala go to Puran but he is disappointed with both of them. As he is leaving for Punjab, Chiku arrives and confesses to having stolen the Vajrakavach.

She plans to tell the truth the next day in court but Marfatia kidnaps her. Puran fights the goons and gets her back and she tells the truth in court. Marfatia Pharmaceuticals is closed down and Puran is given back his ancestral heritage. He tells the Ayurveda is the best medicine of all and we should preserve it.

== Cast ==
- Dharmendra as Jaywant Parmar "Jitte" / Parmar Shah (Fake)
- Sunny Deol as Puran Singh / Puran Shah (Fake)
- Bobby Deol as Kala 'K' Singh / Kalia / Kala Shah (Fake)
- Kriti Kharbanda as Dr. Chiku, Kala's girlfriend
- Binnu Dhillon as Billa Singh
- Shatrughan Sinha as Judge Sunil "Mithoo" Sinha
- Asrani as Nanu
- Satish Kaushik as Advocate Rajender Uttam Singh Bedi
- Mohan Kapoor as Marfatia
- Paresh Ganatra as Paresh Manubhai Jeevrajbhai Dayaljibhai Amritlal Indu Kumar Badvant Bhai Nagaddas Bhai Jamnadas Bhai Hemchand Kumar Patel
- Savita Bhatti as Judge
- Rajesh Sharma as Lawyer Bhatia
- Ashu Sharma as Preston
- Anita Devgan as Sati
- Bharat Bhatia as Sainath
- Salman Khan as Mastana (cameo appearance)
- Rekha as herself (special appearance)
- Sonakshi Sinha as herself (special appearance)
- Hema Sharma as Dr. Subhi

== Production ==
=== Development ===
The official announcement of the film was made in June 2017.

=== Casting ===
The film continues to have the franchise's original male cast: Dharmendra, Sunny Deol and Bobby Deol. It was earlier reported that Kajal Aggarwal could be playing the female lead against Bobby. In August 2017, it was confirmed that Kriti Kharbanda had been finalized to play the female lead opposite Bobby Deol in the film.

=== Filming ===
Principal photography of the film commenced in the second week of August 2017. The first schedule of the film will be shot in Ramoji Film City.

== Marketing and promotion ==
The first look of the film was revealed by Taran Adarsh as well as Deol's Twitter handles on 13 June 2018 citing the release date to be 15 August 2018. The second poster of the film was released on 30 July 2018 by Sunny Deol on his Instagram handle which showed the release date of the film as 31 August 2018.

The first teaser of the film was released on 14 June 2018. The teaser showcased three Deols, leading lady Kriti Kharbanda and Salman Khan as narrator and a cameo appearance. A trailer was released on 10 August 2018.

== Reception ==
The film received generally poor reviews. All the reviews were particularly critical of the film's weak plot and slapstick comedy. Ronak Kotecha of The Times of India gave it 2.5/5 stars calling it a "loud comedy that loses much of its steam in the second half and culminates into a predictable climax".

== Music and soundtrack ==
Yamla Pagla Deewana : Phir Se

Soundtrack album by Sachet–Parampara, Vishal Mishra, Sanjeev-Darshan, and D Soldierz
- Released: 31 August 2018
- Recorded: 2018
- Genre: Feature film soundtrack
- Length: 14:31
- Language: Hindi
- Label: Saregama Music
External audio
- Official Audio Jukebox on YouTube

Vishal Mishra chronology
Race 3 (2018)	Yamla Pagla Deewana: Phir Se (2018)	Notebook (2019)

Sachet–Parampara chronology
Toilet: Ek Prem Katha (2017)	Yamla Pagla Deewana: Phir Se (2018)	Batti Gul Meter Chalu (2018)

Sanjeev-Darshan chronology
Beiimaan Love (2016)	Yamla Pagla Deewana: Phir Se (2018)	Bhaiaji Superhit (2018)

The music for the film’s songs was composed by Sachet–Parampara, Vishal Mishra, Sanjeev-Darshan, and D Soldierz. The lyrics of the songs were penned by Pulkit Rishi, Kunwar Juneja and D Soldierz. The background score of the movie was done by Raju Singh.

The song "Rafta Rafta" which is rapped by Rekha and sung by Sonakshi Sinha.

Track listing
No.	Title	Lyrics	Music	Singer(s)	Length
1.	"Rafta Rafta Medley"	Kunwar Juneja	Vishal Mishra	Rekha, Sonakshi Sinha, Vishal Mishra, Jordi Patel, Disha Sharma, Akash Ojha	4:57
2.	"Nazarbattu"	Pulkit Rishi	Sachet–Parampara	Sachet Tandon	3:10
3.	"Little Little"	D Soldierz	D Soldierz	Harrdy Sandhu	3:15
4.	"Tunu Tunu"	Kunwar Juneja	Sanjeev Darshan	Alamgir Khan, Jyotica Tangri	3:09
Total length:					14:31
