= Kristina Akheeva =

Australian actress and model

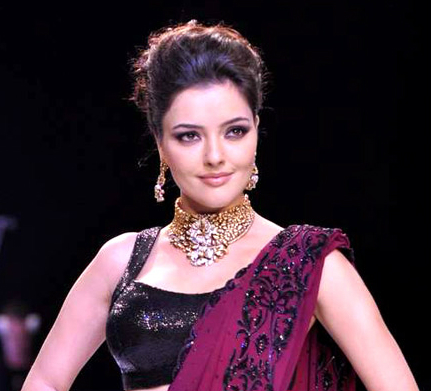
- Kristina Akheeva at IIJW, 2013
- Born: 1 November 1986 (age 39); Khabarovsk, Russia
- Citizenship: Australia
- Occupations: Model, actress
- Years active: 2013–2015
- Website: www.kristina-akheeva.com

Kristina Akheeva is a Russian-born Australian actress and model. She made her Bollywood debut with 2013 film Yamla Pagla Deewana 2, followed by Telugu film Galipatam which released in 2014. She debuted in Kannada in an Upendra classic Uppi 2.

== Early life ==
Kristina was born in Khabarovsk, Russia, to Russian parents. At age 7, Kristina moved to Australia, where she spent the rest of her school life. At 21, a modelling agent in Singapore offered her a 3-month modelling contract, she accepted and spent 6 years working as a model and living in 6 different countries including India.

== Career ==
Akheeva had studied acting at the Film and TV Academy in Melbourne Australia, before becoming a full-time model. She spent 6 years modeling around the world and living in 6 different countries. She had done campaigns for brands such as Palmolive, Sunsilk, Vaseline lotion, dish TV and was the face of many fashion and jewellery brands worldwide.

While in India for a modelling contract she auditioned for the lead role opposite Sunny Deol in Sangeeth Sivan's action comedy Yamla Pagla Deewana 2. Looking for a foreign face, the filmmakers chose her and she took a break from modelling. In August 2012 her casting was confirmed. During the filming she worked on her Hindi and dubbed for herself. Deol's father Dharmendra who also played an important role in the film said that he wanted "to play Sunny's character so that I could have romanced her".

In 2014 she made her Tollywood debut with Galipatam. Directed by debutante Naveen Gandhi. Akheeva garnered praise for her performance, Tollywood times wrote, "She is one girl to watch out for. Although she is from Australia, she eases comfortably into the part of an Indian girl. Her performance was brilliant. She is a well-trained actress and will soon reach more heights in Telugu Cinema." Akheeva has also acted in a lead role for a new Kannada movie named Uppi2 opposite Upendra. The film is a bilingual released in Kannada and Telugu, the movie has set the record for being highest rated movie in the world. She is also a trained salsa dancer. During India International Jewellery Week 2013, she was the showstopper for Anmol jewellers and in 2014 IIJW. She was the showstopper for D Navinchandra.

== Filmography ==
Year	Title	Role	Notes	Ref
2013	Yamla Pagla Deewana 2	Reet	Debut Hindi Film	
2014	Galipatam	Parineeti	Debut Telugu Film	
2015	Uppi 2	Lakshmi	Debut Kannada Film	
