= Bobby Deol =

Indian actor (born 1969)

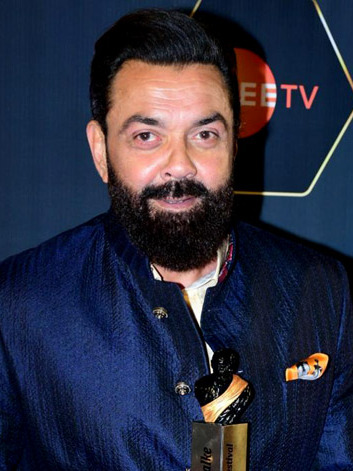
- Deol in 2024
- Born: Vijay Singh Deol; 27 January 1969 (age 57); Bombay, Maharashtra, India
- Education: Mithibai College, Mumbai
- Occupation: Actor
- Years active: 1995–present
- Organisation: Vijayta Films
- Works: Filmography
- Spouse: Tanya Deol (m. 1996)
- Children: 2
- Father: Dharmendra
- Relatives: Sunny Deol (brother); Esha Deol (half-sister); Abhay Deol (cousin)
- Family: Deol family
- Awards: See list

Vijay Singh Deol (born 27 January 1969), professionally known as Bobby Deol is an Indian actor who primarily works in Hindi cinema along with a few Tamil and Telugu films. In a career spanning more than three decades, Deol is known for portraying a range of unconventional roles in both films and OTT platforms. A member of the Deol family, he is the younger son of actor Dharmendra and the younger brother of actor Sunny Deol.

After appearing as a child artist in Dharam Veer (1977), Deol had his first lead role in the romance Barsaat (1995), which won him the Filmfare Award for Best Male Debut. He subsequently starred in the commercially successful action thrillers Gupt (1997), Soldier (1998), Badal (2000), Bichhoo (2000), Ajnabee (2001), and Humraaz (2002). For Humraaz, he received a nomination for the Filmfare Award for Best Actor. He also starred with his father Dharmendra and brother Sunny Deol in commercially successful Apne (2007) and Yamla Pagla Deewana (2011).

This was followed by a career downturn, during which his notable commercial successes were the ensemble films Race 3 (2018), and Housefull 4 (2019). In the 2020s, Deol found renewed success with the streaming projects Class of '83 (2020), Aashram (2020–present), Love Hostel (2022) and The Ba***ds of Bollywood (2025). He gained further acclaim for playing antagonist in the top-grossing action drama film Animal (2023), which earned him a nomination for the Filmfare Award for Best Supporting Actor.

== Early life and family ==
Deol was born in Bombay on 27 January 1969 as Vijay Singh Deol into a Punjabi Jat family affiliated with the Arya Samaj, a Hindu monotheist and reformist movement. He is the younger brother of Sunny Deol and also has two sisters Vijayta and Ajeeta who live in California. His step-mother is Hema Malini, through whom he has two paternal half-sisters, actress Esha Deol and Ahana Deol. His cousin Abhay Deol is also an actor. He is the paternal uncle of Bollywood actors Karan Deol and Rajveer Deol. Bobby completed his schooling at Mayo College in Ajmer, Rajasthan. After completing his schooling he obtained a bachelor of commerce degree from Mithibai College in Mumbai.

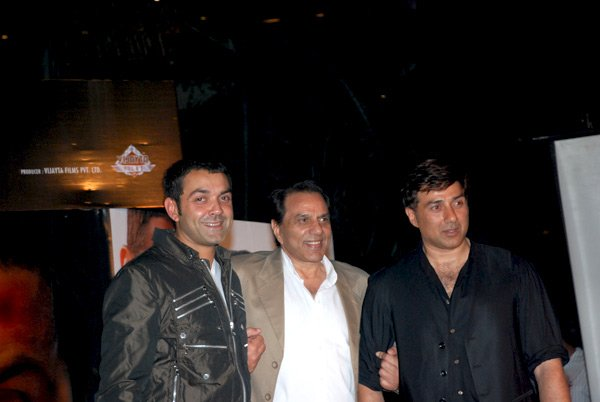
Deol with his father Dharmendra and brother Sunny Deol in 2008.

He married Tanya Ahuja in 1996; the couple has two sons born in 2001 and 2004 respectively.

== Acting career ==
=== Early success (1995–2002) ===
Deol made his acting debut as an adult alongside Twinkle Khanna in Rajkumar Santoshi's 1995 romance film Barsaat, where he played a naive but intelligent young man who moves from a small village to the big city and gets caught up with corrupt police and criminal gangs amidst falling in love. The film was a superhit at the box office and garnered him the Filmfare Award for Best Male Debut. He replicated this success with his next starring role in Rajiv Rai's suspense thriller Gupt: The Hidden Truth (1997) alongside Manisha Koirala and Kajol, as a man accused of murdering his stepfather over an engagement proposal and wrongly imprisoned. Besides commercial profitability, Gupt was highly acclaimed for its storyline and soundtrack. His other release of 1997 was Aur Pyaar Ho Gaya alongside Aishwarya Rai, which flopped at the box office.

Deol's first release of 1998, Vidhu Vinod Chopra's Kareeb, became his second consecutive flop. He teamed up with Abbas–Mustan for the first of many collaborations in the military thriller Soldier (1998), co-starring Raakhee and Preity Zinta, in which played the son of a man who was convicted of arms smuggling. Soldier received positive response from critics, eventually proving to be a superhit and his third major commercial success after Barsaat and Gupt. By this time, Deol's popularity rivaled that of the top actors, including the three Khans, his brother Sunny Deol, and Govinda. His sole release of 1999 was the unremarkable love triangle Dillagi, directed by his brother Sunny Deol.

Deol began the next century starring with Rani Mukerji in the financially successful action dramas Badal and Bichhoo (both 2000). In Badal, set around the 1984 riots in engulfing parts of Punjab and Delhi, his character witnesses the massacre of his family and villagers by a corrupt inspector and grows up to be a dreaded terrorist. In Bichhoo, Deol's role as a young middle-class guy who falls in love with a wealthy woman was panned although the film hailed good box-office returns. He was later paired with Karisma Kapoor in Hum To Mohabbat Karega (2000) and Aashiq (2001), both flops. Deol next essayed a married guy entangled in a web of deceit and extra-marital affairs, in Abbas–Mustan's thriller Ajnabee (2001) alongside Kareena Kapoor, Akshay Kumar and Bipasha Basu. The film was an average grosser, but garnered praise for Kumar and Deol's performances.

He reunited with Sunny Deol for the failed historical drama 23rd March 1931: Shaheed (2002), where he and his brother portrayed the roles of freedom fighters Bhagat Singh and Chandra Shekhar Azad respectively. Set in British India, the film depicts the events leading up to the hanging of Bhagat Singh and his companions Rajguru and Sukhdev on 23 March 1931. With the film receiving polarising reviews, Rediff.com believed the movie had plenty of good moments, and plenty of bad ones and believed the film was superior to that of the original on Bhagat Singh, although they believed the agony of Bhagat Singh's fight was underplayed, diminishing the brutality and anguish suffered in the real-life event. While Deol was praised for some scenes, he was criticised for his loud acting and Rediff.com believed he was overshadowed by Ajay Devgan in The Legend of Bhagat Singh remarking, "In terms of performance, Devgan is clearly the winner, with the advantage of a stronger script and a better director. Devgan, who reportedly lost weight to look the part, is today emerging as one of India's finest actors, willing to try out different roles. Deol tries his best, but it is difficult to shout and act simultaneously."

Later in 2002, Deol was nominated for the Filmfare Award for Best Actor for his role as a suave, wealthy shipping businessman in Abbas-Mustan's romantic thriller Humraaz, where he was involved in a love triangle with Ameesha Patel and Akshaye Khanna. The film was moderately successful but received positive reviews from critics, with Chitra Mahesh of The Hindu saying, "Deol spends the entire first half looking moony eyed and spaced out, but overcomes the stupor towards the end where he actually gives a good performance." His final act in 2002 was of a small-time crook who gets his hands on some diamonds worth millions, in David Dhawan's Chor Machaaye Shor alongside Shilpa Shetty, Bipasha Basu, Paresh Rawal and Om Puri.

=== Career setback and hiatus (2003–2017) ===
After a one-year gap, Deol returned with Kismat (2004) pairing Priyanka Chopra. He went on to play army officers in his next two 2004 releases, Vikram Bhatt's Bardaasht and Anil Sharma's Ab Tumhare Hawale Watan Saathiyo. While the former dealt with themes of police brutality and corruption and justice, the latter was an ensemble film starring Amitabh Bachchan, Akshay Kumar and Deol (in a double role). All these films did not perform well commercially. However, for the lattermost, he received praise for his role which had him wear a pugh/turban, which gave him more of an audience from the Punjabi crowd, and inspired comments saying he looks better in a turban.

Deol reteamed with Vikram Bhatt for the thriller Jurm (2005), hailing praise for his role as a wealthy businessman who suspects his wife of having an affair with Rohit. Rediff.com remarked "Bobby Deol, Bhatt's schoolmate, does his alma mater proud with his controlled performance. There's a sense of maturity about his candour, which is good news." He also essayed a trooper operating in the northeastern Indian province fighting Bodo militants in Upper Assam alongside Sanjay Dutt, Suniel Shetty and Ajay Devgn in Mani Shankar's war film Tango Charlie and an ambitious Indian living abroad with Chopra and Basu in Suneel Darshan's love triangle Barsaat (both 2005). Neither of these films resurged his commercial appeal, with Ziya us Salaam of The Hindu concluding for Barsaat, "A moth-eaten love triangle with all the stereotypes Bollywood survives on – a devoted wife with her karva chauth ki thali, the other woman with her mini-skirts, a joint family, songs, festivities..... No shower of rejuvenation, this Barsaat is just drenched in mediocrity." He was equally unimpressed with Deol's performance, remarking, "The girls are ready with their curls and curves, the guy just appears lost, making you wonder if Bobby has grown even an inch as an actor since he made his debut in Rajkumar Santoshi's film of the same name."

His final role of 2005 was Dosti: Friends Forever with Akshay Kumar, Lara Dutta, Kareena Kapoor and Juhi Chawla, which underperformed in India, but was a major success in the United Kingdom. In 2006, Deol reunited with Ameesha Patel in the romantic musical film Humko Tumse Pyaar Hai, where his characters falls in love with a beautiful blind woman who has a talent for shaping pottery. Their pairing was hugely hyped and had been labelled as the "Bollywood equivalent of Hugh Grant and Renée Zellweger". Although the film became his eighth consecutive failure, critics praised Deol's performance with Taran Adarsh commenting, "Bobby Deol is only getting better as an actor. He manages to register an impact in a film that belongs to Patel and Rampal primarily."

In 2007, Deol had a record 6 releases, including two cameos. The first, Shakalaka Boom Boom, was shot in South Africa and addressed the themes of envy, jealousy, insecurity, anxiety, manipulation and anger. Co-starring Upen Patel, Kangana Ranaut and Celina Jaitley, it was praised by critics, especially for its choreography; Taran Adarsh of IndiaFM.com said after viewing the film, "Both Bobby and Upen get fabulous roles and the two actors make the most of it. Bobby is one of the most under-rated actors around. His work has been consistent all through, but one tends to overlook this talented actor's abilities all the while. Watch him go negative in Shakalaka Boom Boom and you'd agree that he's amongst the best in the business today. His outburst in the end is remarkable." He next featured in Shaad Ali and Yash Raj Films's Jhoom Barabar Jhoom opposite Abhishek Bachchan, Preity Zinta and Lara Dutta. The film had a hit soundtrack but received negative reviews for its "shallow screenplay", and even Deol was believed to have been overshadowed by Bachchan and Zinta. Both films failed to do well, continuing the streak of decline for Deol.

Deol finally found a commercial success in Anil Sharma's boxing drama Apne (2007), a family affair in which his father Dharmendra played a disgraced retired boxer who trains Deol and his brother (Sunny Deol) to become champion boxers but in doing so creates a rift within the family. He reteamed with Abbas–Mustan for his last release of 2007, the romantic thriller Naqaab, with Akshaye Khanna and Urvashi Sharma. Deol received mixed reviews for his performance. For instance, Raja Sen of Rediff.com praised several of his scenes, remarking, "Bobby gets a considerably meaty role, and there are a couple of moments when he genuinely works the audience", but describes his character as "sensitive to an annoying hilt". Naqaab was a major commercial disaster.

In 2008, Deol starred as an orphan raised by a Naxal leader opposite Priyanka Chopra, Danny Denzongpa and Irrfan Khan in Kabeer Kaushik's crime drama Chamku, set in the interiors of Bihar. Kaushik initially approached him to play the lead role in his debut film, Sehar, but despite liking the script, Deol had turned it down because at the time he was not prepared to work with a debutant director. He worked in another failed ensemble film Heroes (2008) as an army officer with Salman Khan, Preity Zinta, Sunny Deol and Mithun Chakraborty. Heroes was filmed in Ladakh, Chandigarh, Punjab and Delhi. Deol had a special appearance in the Karan Johar-produced romantic comedy Dostana (2008) starring Chopra, Bachchan and John Abraham. Dostana is the first Bollywood film to be filmed entirely in Miami, United States and went on to become the eighth highest-grossing film at the Indian box office in 2008.

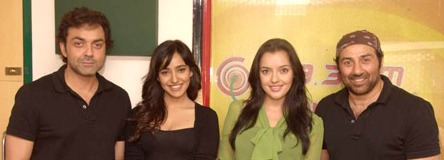
Deol while promoting Yamla Pagla Deewana 2 in 2013

The following year, Deol portrayed an orphan-turned-assassin wrongly accused of a politician's murder in the unnoticed Ek: The Power of One (2009). His next film Help (2010), shot in Mauritius, too failed to make an impact. In 2011, Deol had starring roles in the comedies Yamla Pagla Deewana (co-starring Dharmendra and Sunny Deol), which spawned a sequel later in 2013, and Thank You (co-starring Kumar, Irrfan Khan, Suniel Shetty and Sonam Kapoor). His following release, the heist film Players (2012), featured him as a master of illusions. Neither of these films except Yamla Pagla Deewana were critically and commercially profitable.

After a slew of commercial failures, Deol went on a hiatus of three years due to lack of work. He later spoke on Koffee with Karan where he confessed,

“I gave up. I started pitying myself and just took up drinking a lot. I was just sitting at home and I used to keep cursing and saying ‘Why don’t people take me? I am good.’ I think I became very negative about everything. I used to sit at home, my wife would work. And suddenly I heard my son saying ‘Mom, papa sits at home and you go to work everyday.’ And then something snapped in me and I said ‘No, I can’t do this anymore’.”

Following the hiatus, he tried to make a comeback with Shreyas Talpade's Poster Boys (2017) alongside Sunny Deol. However, the film turned out to be another failure and failed to re-establish Deol.

=== Ensemble films and streaming projects (2018–2022) ===
Deol had a supporting role in the action thriller Race 3 (2018), alongside Salman Khan and Anil Kapoor. Despite receiving negative reviews, it grossed ₹303 crore worldwide becoming the sixth highest-earning Hindi film of 2018. The threequel Yamla Pagla Deewana: Phir Se was his second release of the year, which tanked miserably at the box office repeating the fate of Yamla Pagla Deewana 2.

The ensemble comedy Housefull 4 (2019) co-starring Akshay Kumar and Riteish Deshmukh, was Deol's subsequent film. It grossed ₹295 crore worldwide and became a superhit. He played a police officer in the Netflix film Class of '83 (2020). His performance earned him a Filmfare OTT Award for Best Actor in a Web Original Film nomination. In 2020, his web series Aashram premiered on MX Player original series where he played the character of Baba Nirala. Deol's role of an antagonist earned him much critical praise and two nominations for the Filmfare OTT Award for Best Actor in a Drama Series, and this made him repeat villainous roles in his next films Love Hostel (2022), which also featured Sanya Malhotra and Vikrant Massey.

=== Renaissance (2023–present) ===
Deol achieved a significant turning point in his career portraying the main antagonist alongside Ranbir Kapoor and Anil Kapoor in Sandeep Reddy Vanga's action drama Animal (2023). The film emerged as a major commercial success at the box-office, grossing over ₹917 crore worldwide. Despite the film's mixed reception, his portrayal of a mute psychopath was praised although several critics felt that his part was too brief. Firstpost called Deol's performance "menacing" and a standout element of the film, praising that "[Deol] showcases remarkable emotive skills without the use of dialogues, leaving audiences in awe of his ability to convey emotions through expressions alone." Animal solidified Deol's comeback in Hindi cinema. His performance earned him a nomination for the Filmfare Award for Best Supporting Actor, and garnered him both the IIFA Award and the Zee Cine Award for Best Performance in a Negative Role.

In 2024, Deol played a negative role opposite Suriya in the Tamil period action drama Kanguva, which ranks amongst the most expensive Indian films. However, it turned out to be a box-office bomb and received negative reviews. It marked his debut in Tamil cinema.

Deol's first release in 2025, he played a negative role opposite Nandamuri Balakrishna in the Telugu action drama Daaku Maharaaj. It became a moderate success at the box office and marked his debut in Telugu cinema. Deol worked in his career's second Telugu film Hari Hara Veera Mallu: Part 1. (Note: co–starring Pawan Kalyan, Nidhi Agerwal, Nargis Fakhri and Nora Fatehi) He next starred in Anurag Kashyap's thriller film Bandar with Sanya Malhotra. The film was presented in 2025 Toronto International Film Festival in Special Presentation section. In the same year, he played the antagonist Ajay Talwar, a larger-than-life film superstar in Aryan Khan's Netflix web series The Ba***ds of Bollywood (2025). The show garnered positive reviews and strong viewership. The song "Duniya Haseenon Ka Mela" from Deol's 1997 film Gupt, which featured Deol, was reused in the show. This led to a resurgence of popularity for the song and Deol's older films.

In 2026, he appeared in the Tamil political action thriller Jana Nayagan (Note: co-starring Vijay in his final credited role before entering full-time politics and Pooja Hegde) and the YRF Spy Universe film Alpha. (Note: co-starring Alia Bhatt, Sharvari, and Anil Kapoor) Both the films proved to be critical and commercial failures.

== Awards and nominations ==
List of Bobby Deol awards and nominations
Year	Award	Category	Work	Result	Ref.
1996	Screen Awards	Best Male Debut	Barsaat	Won	
1996	Filmfare Awards	Best Male Debut	Barsaat	Won	
1998	Sansui Viewers' Choice Movie Awards	Best Actor	Gupt: The Hidden Truth	Nominated	
2003	Filmfare Awards	Best Actor	Humraaz	Nominated	
2008	Zee Cine Awards	Best Supporting Actor	Jhoom Barabar Jhoom	Nominated	
2009	Stardust Awards	Best Supporting Actor	Dostana	Nominated	
2011	Bhaskar Bollywood Awards	Jodi No. 1 (Note: Jodi No. 1 shared with Dharmendra and Sunny Deol)	Yamla Pagla Deewana	Nominated	
2012	Producers Guild Film Awards	Best Actor in a Comic Role	Yamla Pagla Deewana	Nominated	
2021	Filmfare OTT Awards	Best Actor – Drama Series	Aashram	Nominated	
2021	Filmfare OTT Awards	Best Actor – Film	Class of '83	Nominated	
2021	Lions Gold Awards	Best OTT Actor	Class of '83	Won	
2022	Filmfare OTT Awards	Best Actor – Drama Series	Aashram	Nominated	
2023	Zee Cine Awards	Jury's choice – Best Villain	Love Hostel	Won	
2024	Filmfare Awards	Best Supporting Actor	Animal	Nominated	
2024	Zee Cine Awards	Best Performance in a Negative Role	Animal	Won	
2024	IIFA Awards	Best Performance in a Negative Role	Animal	Won	
