= RDB (band) =

British band, formed 1997

RDB Rhythm Dhol Bass
- Origin: Bradford, West Yorkshire, England
- Genres: Bhangra; Hip hop Bollywood
- Years active: 1997– 2014
- Label: Three Records ltd
- Members: Manjeet Singh Ral (Manj Musik) Surj Singh Ral
- Past members: Manjeet Singh Ral (Manj Musik) and Kuldeep Singh Ral
- Website: www.rhythmdholbass.com

RDB (an acronym for Rhythm, Dhol, Bass) is a band initially formed in 1997 by three British Indian brothers, Kuldeep, Surjeet and Manjeet Singh Ral. The band's style blends western genres with traditional Punjabi beats and vocals. After the death of the eldest brother Kuldeep in 2012 and the departure of Manjeet to start a solo career, RDB has continued with the brother Surjeet.

== History ==
RDB's musical journey began with singing at the gurdwara: "We used to assist our father in performing in front of the community at our local gurdwara, playing the harmonium and the tabla. This gave us a great understanding of our musical creativity and we mixed this with our passion for technology and started experimenting with sounds." In 2003, they won "Best Club DJ Bhangra" at the UK Asian Music Awards. RDB collaborated with American rapper Snoop Dogg for the song "Singh Is Kinng" from the soundtrack of the 2008 film Singh Is Kinng. They further collaborated with Ludacris for the song "Shera Di Kaum" from the soundtrack of the 2011 film Breakaway.

In April 2011, Kuldeep was diagnosed with a brain tumour and underwent radiotherapy and chemotherapy. He died on 22 May 2012 in Houston, Texas.

While originally the remaining brothers planned to continue working together, A few months after Kuldeep's death, the band split and Surjeet and Manjeet went their separate ways. Surjeet continued to perform under the RDB banner, while Manjeet operated as an independent artist. In 2013, RDB was awarded Best Music Video for "We Doin’ It Big" at the Brit Asia TV Music Awards (BAMA). At BAMA 2014, RDB was awarded Best Music Video for "Daddy Da Cash" featuring T-Pain.

In 2014 Manjeet filed a lawsuit against Surjeet over the use of RDB songs and brand. An application for an interim injunction was rejected by the Bombay High Court. According to Surjeet, the lawsuit was withdrew in 2016. As of 2019, Manjeet is operating independently.

== Discography ==
=== Studio albums ===
Year	Album	Label
2000	The Album	Untouchables Records
2001	Sounds of the North	Untouchables Records
2003	Unstoppable	Untouchables Records
2005	Simply RDB	Untouchables Records
2005	Three	Untouchables Records
2007	Vaisakhi – The Birth of Khalsa	Three Records

=== Singles ===
Year	Song	Label
2011	"Akhian" (ft. Nindy Kaur & Blitzkrieg)	Three Records
2011	"Deewani" (ft. Nindy Kaur)	Three Records
2011	"2 Seater" (ft. Nindy Kaur)	Three Records
2011	"Sachi Gal (The Truth)"	Three Records
2011	"Raati Neendh (Last Night)"	Three Records
2012	"Yaadan" (ft. Harjog Singh)	Three Records
2012	"We Doin' it BIG" (ft. Smooth & Raftaar)	Three Records
2013	"BBM" (ft. Nindy Kaur & Raftaar)	Three Records
2013	"Gal Mitro" (ft. Nindy Kaur & Raftaar)	Three Records
2013	"Daddy Da Cash" (ft. T-Pain)	Three Records
2015	"Sardar Ji" (ft. JessieK)	Three Records

=== Compilations and unofficial albums ===
Year	Album	Label
2001	Danger	Untouchables Records
2002	Urban Flavas	Untouchables Records
2002	Danger 2	Untouchables Records
2003	Urban Flavas 2	Untouchables Records
2003	Heavy	Untouchables Records
2003	Danger 3	Untouchables Records
2005	Urban Flavas 3	Untouchables Records
2005	Saathi (All Together)	Untouchables Records
2007	Asian ROC	Bollyhood Records

=== Soundtracks ===
Year	Song	Movie	Label
2003		Dude, Where's the Party?	Saregama
2007	"Rafta Rafta"	Namastey London	Eros
2008	"Singh is Kinng" (ft. Snoop Dogg)	Singh Is Kinng	Junglee Music
2009	"Paisa Paisa" Manak-E ft RDB	De Dana Dan	Eros/Venus
2009	"Paisa Paisa (Club Mix)"	De Dana Dan	Eros/Venus
2009	"Om Mangalam"	Kambakkht Ishq	Eros/Venus
2009	"Aloo Chaat" (ft. Nindy Kaur & Smooth) "Boliyaan Giddha" (ft. Nindy Kaur)	Aloo Chaat	T-Series
2011	"Shera Di Kaum" (ft. Ludacris)	Speedy Singhs	T-Series
2011	"Title Track"	Yamla Pagla Deewana	T-Series
2011	"Sadi Gali" (ft. Lehmber Hussainpuri)	Tanu Weds Manu	T-Series
2013	"Tamanche Pe Disco" (ft. Nindy Kaur & Raftaar )	Bullett Raja	T-Series
2014	"Sharabi" (ft. SurjRDB & JessieK) with Vishal–Shekhar	Happy New Year	T-Series
2015	"Mari Gali" (ft. NS Chauhan & Dilbagh Singh)	Tanu Weds Manu Returns	T-Series / Eros

=== Collaborations ===
Year	Artist	Title
2002	Indy Sagu	The Debut
2003	Gubi Sandhu	Dil Karda
2004	Manak-E	Paisa
2004	E=MC	Call It What You Want
2004	Gubi Sandhu	Sold My Soul
2004	Sahara	Undisputed
2005	DJ H	The Debut
2006	Manak-E	Darr
2006	E=MC	And What!
2006	Peter Maffay	Ishq Naag (Love Bites)
2007	Manak-E	Aaja
2007	GI Jatt	Militant
2008	DJ H & DJ Rags	Reloaded
2008	Indy Sagu	Reincarnated
2011	Gurjit Rahal	The Takeova
2012	Raftaar	We Doin' it BIG
2013	T-Pain	Daddy Da Cash
