= Rahul B. Seth =

Indian voice actor, voice-dubbing actor, singer-songwriter

- Born: 29 October 1977 (age 48); Lucknow, Uttar Pradesh, India
- Other names: Rahul B. Seth
- Occupations: Voice actor; dubbing artist; R&B singer; songwriter; producer; composer
- Years active: 1994/1995–present

Rahul B. Seth (born 29 October 1977) is an Indian voice actor, dubbing artist, R&B-singer-songwriter, producer and composer.

== Dubbing career ==
Seth started off in around between 1994 and 1995 when he first came to Mumbai and his main interest was always into music and in the creative field. He started off with ad jingles and some backup vocal here and there. Then he discovered the hidden talent of voicing and dubbing and gradually embarked upon that journey. He's performed many Hindi dub-over roles for various foreign films and animation, movies, serials and character voices for ad films. And that's where He found his niche, his mark. He always had the inclination towards music so gradually he also branched out into singing for jingles, title songs and writing and now he has reached a state where he even produced his own jingles and title songs.

== Dubbing roles ==
=== Animated series ===
Program title	Original voice	Character	Dub language	Original language	Number of episodes	Original airdate	Dubbed airdate	Notes
The Yogi Bear Show	Daws Butler	Yogi Bear	Hindi	English	33	1/30/1961- 29 December 1961		Was dubbed in Hindi, much later after its original release.
Kipper the Dog	Martin Clunes	Kipper	Hindi	English	68	9/5/1997- 3 March 2002		
Pokémon	Unknown voice	Unknown character (First Dub)	Hindi	Japanese	1000+	4/1/1997-Current	First Dub; 4/1/2003-2015; Second Dub; 5/19/2014-Current	The First 8 seasons dubbed, were based on the 4Kids Entertainment English dub. The later seasons were also dubbed in Hindi and are also revised translations based on the English dub. A Second Hindi dub has been produced featuring a new Hindi voice cast and translation by UTV Software Communications and aired on Hungama TV. The first dub that Seth was involved in, was produced by Sound and Vision India for Cartoon Network India, Cartoon Network Pakistan and Pogo.

=== Live action films ===
Film title	Actor	Character	Dub language	Original language	Original year release	Dub year release	Notes
Armageddon	Ben Affleck	A. J. Frost (Second Dub)	Hindi	English	1998	2007	Done this character for the second Hindi dub released for a newer Home Media release. The first Hindi dub was previously done by Sound & Vision India.
I Am Legend	Will Smith	Dr. Robert Neville	Hindi	English	2007	2008	
The Dark Knight	Aaron Eckhart	Harvey Dent / Two-Face	Hindi	English	2008	2008	
The Batman (film)	Colin Farrell	Oswald "Oz" Cobblepot / Penguin	Hindi	English	2022	2022	

=== Animated films ===
Film title	Original voice	Character	Dub language	Original language	Original year release	Dub year release	Notes
One Hundred and One Dalmatians	Unknown voice	Unknown character	Hindi	English	1961	????	
Aladdin	Unknown voice	Unknown character	Hindi	English	1992	2005	
The Lion King	Unknown voice	Unknown character	Hindi	English	1994	1995	
The Lion King II: Simba's Pride	Unknown voice	Unknown character	Hindi	English	1998		
