= List of awards and nominations received by Govinda =

Govinda awards and nominations
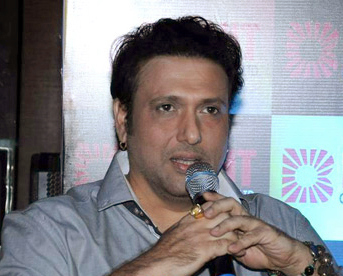
- Govinda at Bright Advertising Awards announcement
Awards and nominations
Award	Wins	Nominations
Filmfare Awards	3	10
Screen Awards	1	1
Zee Cine Awards	4	0
IIFA Awards	2	2
Producers Guild Awards	1	0
Stardust Awards	1	0

Totals (Note: Certain award groups do not simply award one winner. They acknowledge several different recipients, have runners-up, and have third place. Since this is a specific recognition and is different from losing an award, runner-up mentions are considered wins in this award tally. For simplification and to avoid errors, each award in this list has been presumed to have had a prior nomination.)
- Wins: 12
- Nominations: 20

This is a list of awards and nominations of Govinda, an Indian actor.

Govinda (born Govind Arun Ahuja on 21 December 1963) is an Indian actor and a former politician. Govinda has received twelve Filmfare Awards nominations winning three Filmfare Awards.

Making his debut in Ilzaam in 1986, he has appeared in over 140 Hindi films of the Bollywood industry. In June 1999, Govinda was voted as the tenth greatest star of stage or screen of the last thousand years by BBC News Online users. He has received many awards for his performance in Bollywood movies in his career spanning nearly three decades.

== Filmfare Awards ==
Year	Category	Film	Result
1994	Best Actor	Aankhen	Nominated
1996	Best Actor	Coolie No. 1	Nominated
1997	Special Award	Saajan Chale Sasural	Won
1997	Best Actor	Saajan Chale Sasural	Nominated
1998	Best Actor	Deewana Mastana	Nominated
1999	Best Actor	Bade Miyan Chote Miyan	Nominated
2000	Best Comedian	Haseena Maan Jaayegi	Won
2001	Best Villain	Shikari	Nominated
2001	Best Comedian	Kunwara	Nominated
2002	Best Comedian	Jodi No.1	Nominated
2002	Best Comedian	Kyo Kii... Main Jhuth Nahin Bolta	Nominated
2003	Best Comedian	Akhiyon Se Goli Maare	Nominated
2020	Special Award for Excellence in Indian Cinema Award		Won

== Star Screen Awards ==
Year	Category	Film	Result
1995	Special Jury Award	Coolie No. 1	Won
1998	Special Jury Award	Deewana Mastana	Won
1998	Best Actor Award	Deewana Mastana	Nominated
2000	Best Actor Award	Haseena Maan Jaayegi	Nominated
2001	Best Actor in a Negative Role	Shikari	Nominated
2008	Best Comic Actor	Partner	Nominated
2015	Best Comic Actor	Happy Ending	Nominated

== Zee Cine Awards ==
Year	Category	Film	Result
1997	Best Actor in a Comic Role	Deewana Mastana	Nominated
1998	Best Actor in a Comic Role	Aunty No. 1	Nominated
1998	Best Actor in a Comic Role	Dulhe Raja	Won
1999	Best Actor in a Comic Role	Bade Miyan Chote Miyan	Won
2000	Best Actor in a Comic Role	Haseena Maan Jaayegi	Won
2002	Best Actor in a Comic Role	Waah! Tera Kya Kehna	Nominated
2008	Best Actor in a Supporting Role (Male)	Partner	Won

== IIFA Awards ==
Year	Category	Film	Result
2000	Best Actor	Haseena Maan Jaayegi	Nominated
2002	Best Comedian	Jodi No.1	Won
2008	Best Comedian	Partner	Won
2008	Best Actor in a Supporting Role	Partner	Nominated
2010	Best Comedian	Life Partner	Nominated

== Apsara Film & Television Producers Guild Awards ==
Year	Category	Film	Result
2008	Best Actor in a Comic Role	Partner	Nominated
2008	Best Jodi of the Year	Partner (with Salman Khan)	Won
2015	Best Comic Actor	Happy Ending	Nominated
2015	Best Villain	Kill Dil	Nominated

== Stardust Awards ==
Year	Category	Film(s)	Result
2008	Best Supporting Actor	Partner	Nominated
2010	Best Actor in a Comic Role	Life Partner	Nominated
2011	Best Supporting Actor	Raavan	Nominated
2015	Best Supporting Actor	Happy Ending & Kill Dil	Won

== Hiru Golden Film Awards ==
Year	Category	Result
2018	Contribution to Asian Cinema	Won

== Sansui Viewer's Choice Awards ==
Year	Category	Film(s)	Result
2001	Best Comic Actor	Kunwara	Nominated

== The Ghanta Awards ==
Year	Category	Film(s)	Result
2011	Worst On-Screen Couple Shared with: Sushmita Sen	Do Knot Disturb	Nominated

== Indian Telly Awards ==
Year	Category	Film(s)	Result
2015	Best Judge on a TV Show	Dance India Dance Super Moms (Seanson 2) Shared with: Geeta Kapoor · Terence Lewis	Nominated

== Pinkvilla Style Icons Awards ==
Year	Category	Result
2023	Super Stylish Timeless Icon	Won

== Honours ==
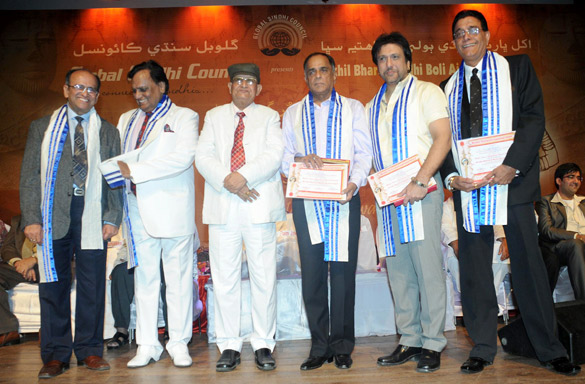
Govinda (second from right) at the 2012 Mother Teresa Awards

In 1999, Govinda was voted the world's tenth-greatest star of stage or screen in a BBC News Online poll. In July 2016, he was recognized as Actor of the Decade at the India Leadership Conclave in Mumbai.
