= Govinda (actor) =

Indian politician and former actor (born 1963)

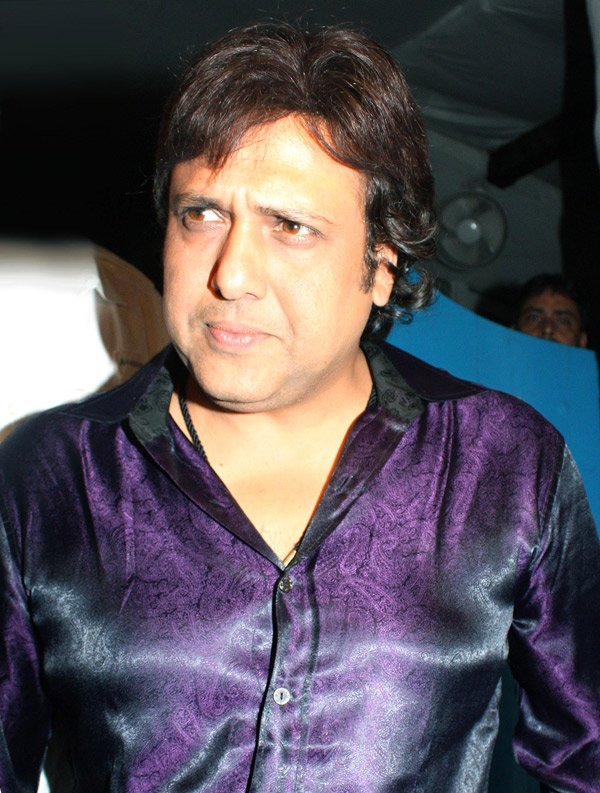
- Govinda in 2011

Member of Parliament, Lok Sabha
- In office 10 May 2004 – 16 May 2009
- Preceded by: Ram Naik
- Succeeded by: Sanjay Nirupam
- Constituency: Mumbai North, Maharashtra

Personal details
- Born: Govind Arun Ahuja; 21 December 1963 (age 62) Bombay, Maharashtra, India
- Party: Shiv Sena (since 2024)
- Other political affiliations: Indian National Congress (2004–2009)
- Spouse: Sunita Ahuja (m. 1987)
- Children: 2 (Note: One is deceased)
- Parents: Arun Kumar Ahuja; Nirmala Devi
- Relatives: See Govinda family
- Occupation: Actor; politician
- Years active: 1986–present (actor); 2004–present (politician)

Govind Arun Ahuja (born 21 December 1963) is an Indian actor-turned-politician, who has appeared in more than 160 Hindi-language films. A leading actor throughout the late 1980s, 1990s, and early 2000s, Govinda is known for his slapstick performances and dancing skills and comic timing. He has received 12 Filmfare Award nominations and won two Filmfare Special Awards and one Filmfare Award for Best Comedian.

Starting out as an action and dancing hero in the 1980s, his first film was 1986's Love 86, which turned out to be a profitable venture at the box office. He then appeared in subsequent commercial successes, including Ilzaam (1986), Marte Dam Tak (1987), Khudgarz (1987), Sindoor (1987), Dariya Dil (1988), Ghar Ghar Ki Kahani (1988), Hatya (1988), Jaisi Karni Waisi Bharni (1989), Swarg (1990) and Hum (1991). However, Govinda would go on to reinvent himself as a comic hero in the 1990s after his role as a mischievous young NCC cadet in the 1992 romance Shola Aur Shabnam and 1993 action comedy Aankhen, both of which were huge hits. Following the success of these films, Govinda had lead roles in top-grossing films, like Raja Babu (1994), Coolie No. 1 (1995), Saajan Chale Sasural (1996), Hero No. 1 (1997), Deewana Mastana (1997), Dulhe Raja (1998), Bade Miyan Chote Miyan (1998), Haseena Maan Jayegi (1999), Hadh Kar Di Aapne (2000) and Jodi No. 1 (2001). He won the Filmfare Special Award for Saajan Chale Sasural and the Filmfare Award for Best Comedian for Haseena Maan Jaayegi.

After a series of unsuccessful films in the 2000s, his later commercial hits include Bhagam Bhag (2006), Partner (2007), and Holiday (2014), none of which had him as the solo male lead. In 2015, Govinda became a judge on Zee TV's reality show, Dance India Dance Super Moms.

Govinda was a member of the Parliament of India from 2004 to 2009. As the Indian National Congress party member, he was elected as a Member of Parliament (MP) from the Mumbai North constituency of Maharashtra, India in the Lok Sabha elections of 2004. In 2024, just before the Lok Sabha elections, he joined the Shiv Sena.

== Early life and background ==
Govinda was born on 21 December 1963 to former actor Aroon (alias Arun Kumar Ahuja) and singer-actress Nirmala Devi. He belongs to an ethnically mixed family, as, through his father, his grandfather was Punjabi while his grandmother was Sindhi, and he himself identifies more with his Punjabi side.

Govinda's father Aroon hailed from Gujranwala, Punjab which is now in Punjab, Pakistan while his mother was a Bhojpuriya from Varanasi, Uttar Pradesh. His father came to Mumbai to become an actor in the late 1930s. He is best known for appearing in Mehboob Khan's Aurat (1940). Aroon's professional career as an actor lasted over 40 years, from 1939 to 1984. In these years, he worked as a hero in 30 films and in supporting roles in over a dozen films. He produced one unsuccessful film which caused financial loss. The family, living in a bungalow on Mumbai's Carter Road, moved to Virar, a city in northern Mumbai suburb, where Govinda was born. The youngest of 5 children, he was given the pet name "Chi Chi", meaning "little finger" in Punjabi.

== Acting career ==
=== 1986–1991: Rise to fame ===
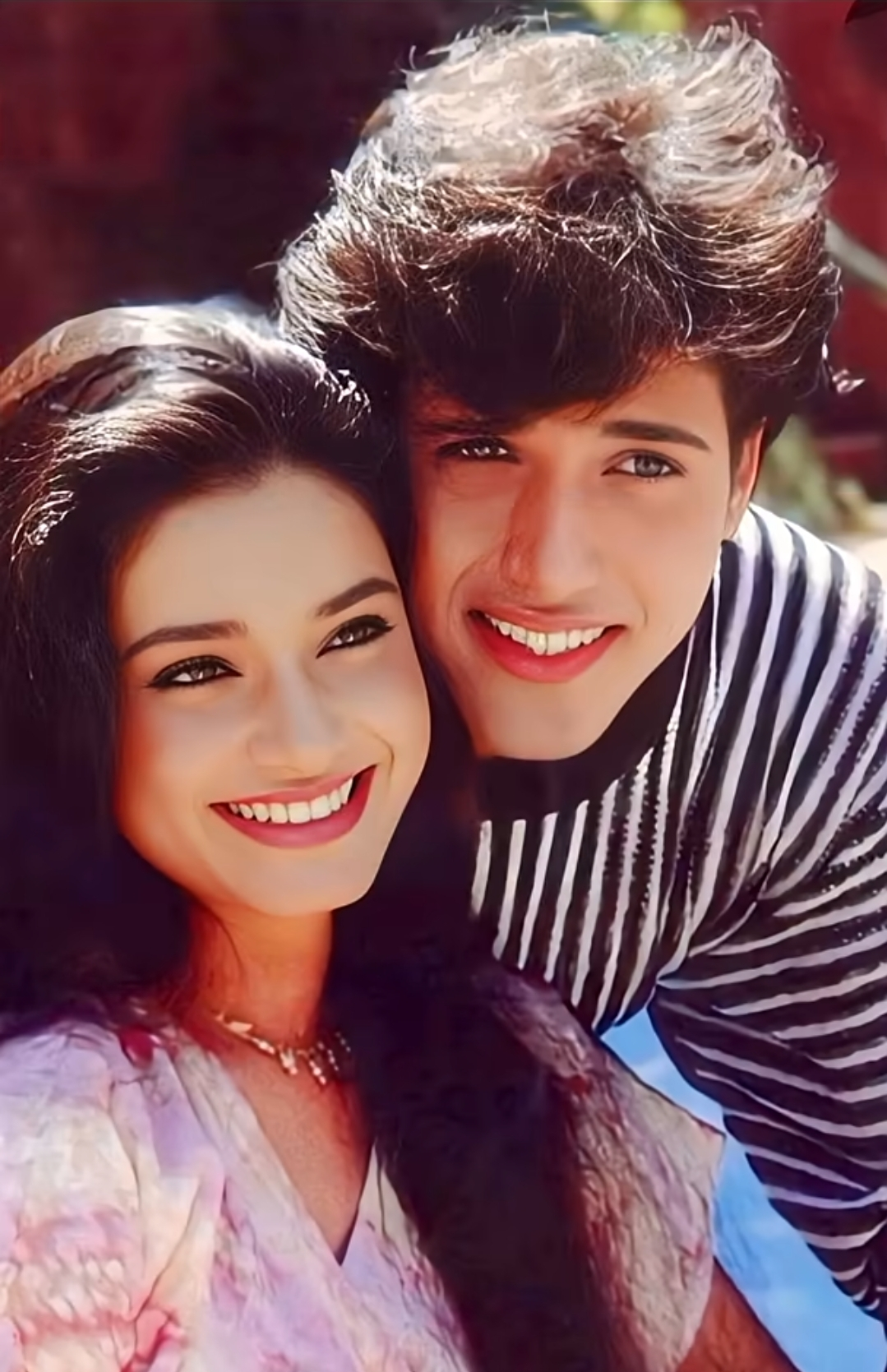
Govinda with Neelam Kothari in 1986

After Govinda received a Bachelor of Commerce degree from Vartak College, Vasai, his father suggested a career in films. Around this time, Govinda saw the film Disco Dancer (1982); afterward, he practised for hours and circulated a promotional VHS cassette. He was offered jobs in a fertiliser commercial and an Allwyn ad.

He was offered the role of Abhimanyu in the popular mythological serial Mahabharat (1988) during its casting and he even had auditioned for it. Soon he bagged his first Bollywood project. His first lead role was in Tan-Badan (1986) opposite Khushbu, directed by his uncle Anand. Govinda began shooting for his next film, Love 86, in June 1985. His first release was Ilzaam (1986), followed by Love 86 that same year, both of which emerged as commercial successes. Tan-Badan also emerged as a commercial hit.

He went on to star in many films of various genres between 1987 and 1989 including the family dramas Khudgarz (1987), Dariya Dil (1988), Ghar Ghar Ki Kahani (1988) and action and drama films including Hatya (1988), Marte Dam Tak (1987), Jeete Hain Shaan Se (1988) and Jung Baaz (1989). Govinda worked with David Dhawan for the first time in the 1989 action film Taaqatwar and worked with Rajinikanth and Sridevi in Gair Kanooni that same year. He was considered one of the top filmstars of Bollywood in the late 1980s.

In 1990, Govinda starred in the cult classic Awaargi, with Anil Kapoor and Meenakshi Sheshadri. Swarg and Maha-Sangram co-starring Vinod Khanna, Aditya Pancholi and Madhuri Dixit were also successful.

In 1991, he appeared alongside Amitabh Bachchan and Rajnikanth in the hit film Hum.

=== 1992–2001: Comedy star ===
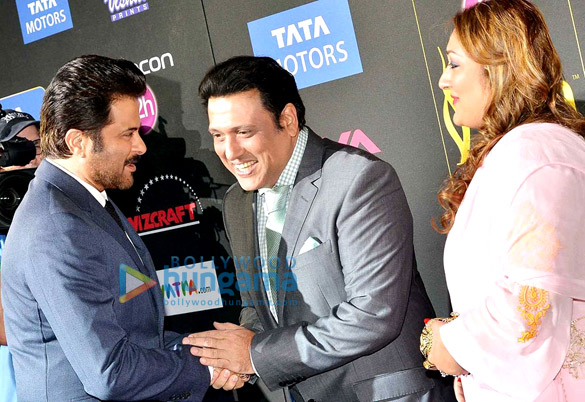
Anil Kapoor, Govinda and his wife at the 2014 IIFA

In 1992, he starred in David Dhawan's action romantic comedy film Shola Aur Shabnam opposite actress Divya Bharti. The film was a box office success and the fourth highest grossing film of 1992 and Govinda's portrayal of a mischievous youngster and NCC cadet gained much praise.

His successful collaboration with Dhawan continued with Aankhen, the highest-grossing film of 1993 and a super blockbuster. Govinda starred in the film in a dual role, alongside Chunky Panday. Aankhen was a blockbuster and established Govinda as a comic hero. Subsequently, he and Dhawan would make several successful comedy films throughout the decade. The film's soundtrack was also popular, particularly the song "Oh Lal Dupatte Wali" still remembered as a symbol of the 1990s Indian music.

In 1994, while Govinda had moderate success in action films such as Khuddar and Dulaara, the comedy film Raja Babu became a super hit. Govinda played the lead role of Raja, a wealthy villager, who falls in love with a girl but she rejects him upon learning about his background. Once again directed by David Dhawan, and starring alongside Karisma Kapoor, Shakti Kapoor, Kader Khan, Aruna Irani, and Prem Chopra, the cast received praise. Govinda's chemistry with Shakti Kapoor and Kader Khan is especially celebrated.

In 1995, Govinda starred in David Dhawan-directed Coolie No. 1, another super hit film. Featuring a cast of familiar actors Karisma Kapoor, Kader Khan, and Shakti Kapoor, along with Harish Kumar, Sadashiv Amrapurkar and Mahesh Anand, the film follows the story of Raju (Govinda), a coolie (labourer), who pretends to be a millionaire to marry an arrogant rich man's daughter, but he ends up falling in love with her. Govinda received the Star Screen Award Special Jury Award for his role in this movie as 'performer of the decade'. Over the years, it has become a cult classic. In 2020, Dhawan remade the film with the same name with his son Varun Dhawan, Sara Ali Khan and Paresh Rawal. In the same year, Govinda also appeared in the action film Andolan, in which he co-starred alongside Sanjay Dutt. The film emerged as another success.

In 1996, Govinda reunited with director David Dhawan in the romantic comedy film Saajan Chale Sasural. After his first wife is presumed dead, Govinda in the role of Shyamsunder remarries. But when it is discovered that his first wife is alive, he has to juggle between his wives, keeping both his marriages a secret. Karisma Kapoor and Tabu feature in the roles of the two wives, while Kader Khan and Satish Kaushik play supporting roles. The film was declared a super hit and became the 2nd highest grossing Indian film of 1996. The songs "Tum To Dhokebaz Ho" & "Dil Jaan Jigar Tujh Pe Nisaar" became extremely popular.

In 1997, Govinda starred in the comedy Hero No. 1, alongside Karisma Kapoor and an ensemble supporting cast of Paresh Rawal, Kader Khan, Satish Shah, among others. In the film, Govinda features as a wealthy business heir who hatches a plan to win the hearts of his girlfriend's family by working as a servant at their home. Upon its release, the film was another super hit for the actor and director David Dhawan, grossing ₹30.95 crore at the box office and was the seventh highest-grossing film of the year. The song "Sona Kitna Sona Hain" is still remembered today. Govinda then starred in romantic comedy Deewana Mastana (1997), co-starring Anil Kapoor and Juhi Chawla. The plot of the film involves a love triangle between the three lead actors, as Govinda's character Bunnu, a mental patient, and Kapoor's character Raja, a crook, try to outsmart each other to impress Chawla's character Neha, a psychiatrist. It was the second hit of the year for Govinda and Dhawan, and despite mixed reviews, Govinda's performance was praised, with Anupama Chopra of India Today writing "Govinda, as always, is an absolute treat."

In 1998, Govinda headlined Harmesh Malhotra-directed comedy Dulhe Raja (1998), featuring Govinda, Raveena Tandon, Kader Khan, Johnny Lever and Asrani, the film became one of the biggest hits of 1998. This is the only hit movie of Govinda's in 90s which wasn't directed by David Dhawan. The film's soundtrack was also a major hit, with songs like "Suno Sasurjee Ab Zidd Chhodo" and "Akhiyon Se Goli Maare" becoming significantly popular. Ankhiyon Se Goli Maare later became the inspiration for the film a film of the same name by director Harmesh Maholtra, starring an almost identical cast.

Also in 1998, Govinda reunited with David Dhawan in the action comedy Bade Miyan Chote Miyan. The film starred an ensemble cast with Amitabh Bachchan and Govinda playing dual roles as a police officer and thief each while also featuring actors Raveena Tandon, Ramya Krishnan, Anupam Kher, Paresh Rawal and Sharat Saxena. It was inspired from William Shakespeare's The Comedy of Errors. Released worldwide on 16 October 1998, it emerged as a major hit with a total gross collection of ₹35.21 crore, despite clashing with Karan Johar's Kuch Kuch Hota Hai. It even managed to beat Kuch Kuch Hota Hai on the opening day. It was a highly anticipated film due to the collaboration of Govinda and Bachchan. . During an interview, Bachchan said that it was a task to keep up with his [Govinda's] energy and performance. Bade Miyan Chhote Miyan earned Govinda a nomination for the best actor at 44th Filmfare Awards. The song "Kisi Disco Mein Jaaye", featuring Govinda dancing in his trademark style along with Raveena Tandon, was a chartbuster.

In 1999, Govinda starred in the comedy Anari No.1, depicting the story of a waiter named Raju kidnapping his rich lookalike Rahul, along with his girlfriend. Paired alongside Raveena Tandon, despite average reviews, Govinda's role was liked. K. N. Vijiyan of New Straits Times wrote that "See this one if you are a fan of Govinda and his brand of comedy". It was a hit at the box office. Govinda then starred in Haseena Maan Jaayegi (1999), a comedy film directed by David Dhawan. Also featuring Sanjay Dutt, Karisma Kapoor and Pooja Batra, with Anupam Kher, Kader Khan, Aruna Irani, and Paresh Rawal in supporting roles, it released on 25 June 1999 with positive critical reception and went on to become the fifth-highest-grossing Hindi film of 1999. It is often regarded as being amongst Govinda's greatest performances, as Govinda was nominated for Best Actor at the 45th Filmfare Awards and won the Comedian of the year award. The song "What Is Mobile Number" was popular for its peppy tune and quirky lyrics.

In 2000, Govinda played six roles in the spy romantic comedy Hadh Kar Di Aapne. Directed by Manoj Agrawal, and starring alongside Rani Mukerji, the film features Govinda in the role of a clumsy detective who takes a trip to Europe to investigate his friend's case. Upon release, the film was a commercial success. "Oye Raaju Pyaar Na Kariyo" sung by Anand Raj Anand became famous at the release.

In 2001, Govinda paired again with director David Dhawan and Sanjay Dutt for Jodi No. 1, a buddy comedy film. Govinda and Dutt play the roles of Veeru and Jai respectively, two best friends and conmen, on the run from a local goon. It also features Anupam Kher, Twinkle Khanna and Monica Bedi. According to Box Office India the film had an excellent opening. Altogether it grossed ₹34 crore and was declared a hit. It was also the tenth highest-grossing film of the year. Govinda was nominated for another Filmfare Award for Best Performance in a Comic Role.

=== 2002–2005: Slump and break from films ===
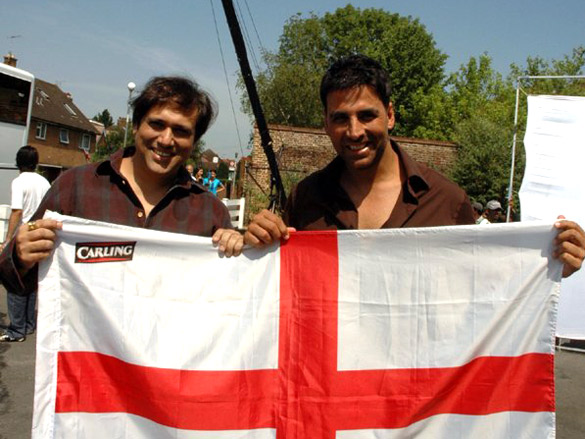
Govinda (left) with Akshay Kumar on the set of Bhagam Bhag

His career faced a setback during the early 2000s after a series of commercially unsuccessful films. His films, Kyo Kii... Main Jhuth Nahin Bolta and such as Akhiyon Se Goli Maare, were all unsuccessful. He received nominations for the Filmfare Award for Best Comedian for Kyo Kii... Main Jhuth Nahin Bolta (2001) and Akhiyon Se Goli Maare (2002).

Govinda then joined the Indian National Congress. He won a seat in Parliament from Mumbai North by defeating five-time MP Ram Naik, a former Minister of Petroleum and Natural Gas, by over 50,000 votes in the 2004 general election.

The actor took a break from films during the period of 2003 to 2005. He had no new film releases in 2004 and 2005, although some of his delayed films were released during this time, (such as 2005's Khullam Khulla Pyaar Karen and Ssukh— produced by Govinda and directed by his brother, Kirti Kumar and 2006's Sandwich) which were box-office failures.

=== 2006–2007: Resurgence as co-lead ===
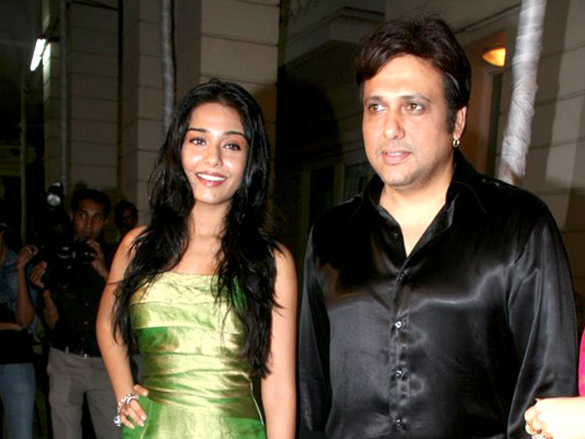
Govinda with Amrita Rao at a Life Partner party

Govinda made a comeback to films in 2006 with the comedy Bhagam Bhag (directed by Priyadarshan), in which he appeared with Akshay Kumar and Lara Dutta. It was Govinda and Kumar's first film together.

His first release of 2007 was director Nikhil Advani's big-budget ensemble romantic comedy-drama, Salaam-e-Ishq: A Tribute to Love. The all-star cast also included Shannon Esra, Salman Khan, Priyanka Chopra, Anil Kapoor, Juhi Chawla, Akshaye Khanna, Ayesha Takia, John Abraham, Vidya Balan, Sohail Khan and Isha Koppikar. Govinda played Raju, a taxi driver who helps the Caucasian Stephanie (Esra) who is frantically trying to find her lover. Raju eventually falls in love with her. Although the film was a box office disappointment, Govinda's performance was praised.

His second release that year was David Dhawan's comedy Partner which was a super-hit co-starring Salman Khan, Lara Dutta and Katrina Kaif. The film grossed ₹300,000,000 in India during its opening week, the second-highest domestic opening-week gross for an Indian film at that time. Govinda won several awards for his performance in Partner including an IIFA Award for Best Comedian and a Zee Cine Award for Best Actor in a Supporting Role – Male. The previously made Jahan Jaaeyega Hamen Paaeyega was directed by his nephew Janmendra alias Dumpy, who was 17 years of age at that time. It was released in 2007 and did poorly at the box office. The film also introduced two of Govinda's nephews, Krishna Abhishek and Vinay Anand. Govinda also appeared in the song "Deewangi Deewangi", from Om Shanti Om (2007) starring Shahrukh Khan.

=== 2008–present: Setbacks ===
In 2008, Govinda appeared in Money Hai Toh Honey Hai, directed by Bollywood choreographer Ganesh Acharya, which was a box office failure. This was followed by a TK Rajeev Kumar directed comedy, Chal Chala Chal. Govinda's performance was praised, and the film was successful. The same year, Salman Khan invited Dhawan and Govinda on his show, 10 Ka Dum, to celebrate the success of Partner.

The following year, he played a lawyer in the hit, Life Partner, and his performance was praised by the critics. Govinda rejoined Dhawan and Vashu Bhagnani for Do Knot Disturb; despite good reviews from critics, it was unsuccessful at the box office.In 2010, Govinda appeared in Mani Ratnam's project, Raavan, with Abhishek Bachchan, Aishwarya Rai and Vikram. He played a Forest Ministry employee who takes Vikram's character through the woods in search of a wanted criminal. Govinda refuted reports that his character was a contemporary version of Hanuman, and his performance in the minor role was praised.

In 2011, he appeared in Jagmohan Mundhra's adult comedy, Naughty @ 40. Although the film received negative reviews, Govinda's performance was appreciated. He also appeared in Rajnish Thakur's comedy, Loot, and voiced Bajrangi the monkey for Nikhil Advani's animated Delhi Safari.

In 2013, Govinda co-starred with Priyanka Chopra in K. C. Bokadia's box office failure, Deewana Main Deewana, which had been made about ten years earlier. The film, a Hindi remake of the Tamil film Priyamudan, was directed by Vincent Selva; Govinda's performance as a villain was praised. He made his Bengali film debut as a deputy inspector general of police in Dipak Sanyal's Samadhi, co-starring Gracy Singh and Sayali Bhagat, another box office failure.

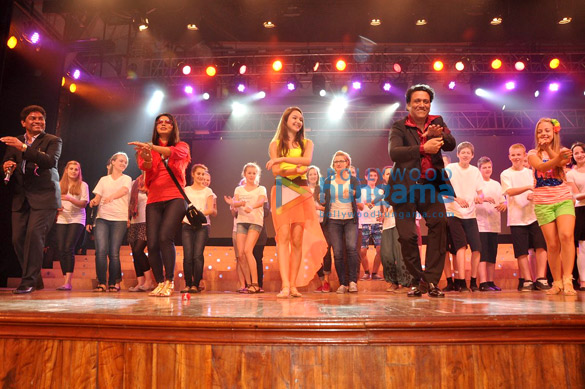
Govinda (second from right) with Johny Lever (extreme left) at ICFPA concert in 2013

In 2014, Govinda appeared in A. R. Murugadoss's Holiday, starring Akshay Kumar and Sonakshi Sinha. This was the second collaboration of Govinda and Akshay Kumar after Bhagam Bhag.

Three years after his last starring role, he starred in Yash Raj Film's Kill Dil, directed by Shaad Ali, with Ranveer Singh, Parineeti Chopra and Ali Zafar. Govinda last played an antagonist in 2000's Shikari. In the film posters, he posed with a gun. The trailer was released on 18 September 2014. The trailer was appreciated by Amitabh Bachchan. The film was released on 14 November 2014; although it was not a commercial success, Govinda's performance was praised by critics.

He played a superstar in Happy Ending with Saif Ali Khan and Ileana D'Cruz, his first appearance with Khan. Its trailer was released on 9 October 2014. The film was released on 21 November 2014; it was a box office disappointment, but Govinda's performance was praised.

In 2015 Govinda appeared in Hey Bro, starring Ganesh Acharya and Nupur Sharma.

In 2017, Govinda was seen as a cop in his home production Aa Gaya Hero, which was directed by Deepankar Senapati. The film also stars former Mrs. Universe India 2011 Richa Sharma, Ashutosh Rana, Murali Sharma, Makarand Deshpande and Harish Kumar. Aa Gaya Hero marks Govinda's third home production, after Hatya and Ssukh. It was released on 17 March 2017. The film was a disaster at the box office. He later starred alongside Varun Sharma in FryDay in 2018.This was also a disaster. His last theatrical release, Rangeela Raja in which he played a dual role in 2019, was panned by critics and audiences, and managed to recover only 1% of its budget.

He was a judge in Zee Bangla's Dance Bangla Dance in its Grand Finale in 2016 and 2018. In 2021, he again appeared as a judge for all episodes on the show.

== Political career ==
=== Early career ===
In 2004, Govinda joined Indian National Congress and was elected to the Lok Sabha (the lower house of the Indian parliament) from Mumbai by 50,000 votes over the five-term incumbent.

During the elections, he said his agenda would be prawaas (transportation), swasthya (health) and gyaan (education). In the field of transportation, he claimed 80% credit for quadrupling of the Borivali-Virar section of the Western Railway zone. According to official sources, he made some efforts in the fields of health and education. The Thane district collector said in an interview that Govinda had committed money from his "local area development fund" (allocated to each MP by the government) to construct anganwadis and solve drinking-water problems in Vasai and Virar but administrative approval was delayed.

=== Resignation ===
During his tenure as the Member of Parliament, Govinda was usually absent when the Lok Sabha was in session and he was severely criticised for inactivity. At the same time, he continued his film career while he was serving as an MP. Indeed, his career witnessed a comeback of sorts in 2007, after the release of Partner. He was pilloried in the press for the combination of continuing to act in films while being generally absent from parliament, and inaccessible to his constituents. On 20 January 2008, Govinda decided to leave politics and concentrate on his Bollywood acting career.

Later Govinda said that he wasted his time by joining politics and it badly affected his films.

=== Joining Shiv Sena ===
Govinda decided to join Shiv Sena before the 2024 Indian General Election. He was welcomed to the party by Eknath Shinde.

== Music career ==
Govinda has worked with music directors Anand Milind and Anand Raj Anand and playback singer Udit Narayan. Narayan has sung more than 100 songs for Govinda in more than 50 films, the greatest number of films and songs he has sung for a particular actor. Other singers associated with Govinda include Kishore Kumar, Amit Kumar, Kumar Sanu, Vinod Rathod, Abhijeet Bhattacharya, Devang Patel and Sonu Nigam. Also, his elder brother Kirti Kumar has sung 2 songs for him. The film Farz Ki Jung (1989) features the popular song "Phool Ka Shabab Kya, Husn Mahatab Kya..." which was sung by Late Mohammed Rafi picturised on Govinda.

His first album, Govinda, was released in 1998. In November 2013, Govinda released his second album, Gori Tere Naina, with actress Pooja Bose. Govinda also wrote lyrics. He is lyricist of "I Love You Bol Daal" song in Haseena Maan Jaayegi (1999).

== Personal life ==
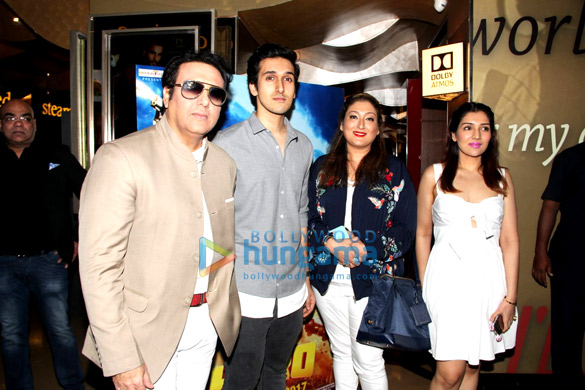
Govinda with wife Sunita Ahuja, son Yashvardhan Ahuja, and daughter Tina Ahuja at the trailer launch of Govinda's movie 'Aa Gaya Hero'

Govinda's brother, Kirti Kumar, was an actor, producer, director and singer. His sister, Kaamini Khanna, was a writer, music director, and singer. Govinda's uncle Anand Singh (assistant to director Hrishikesh Mukherjee), introduced him in Tan-Badan. Singh's sister-in-law, Sunita Munjal, fell in love with Govinda at this time, and they were married on 11 March 1987, with their marriage remaining a secret for four years. Munjal is of half-Punjabi and half-Nepali background and a practising Christian. Their children, daughter Narmada "Tina" Ahuja and son Yashvardhan, have worked in Bollywood films. Tina made her Bollywood debut in Second Hand Husband (2015). Their second daughter who was born premature died at three months of age.

In August 2025, it was reported that Munjal had filed for divorce, citing adultery, cruelty, and desertion on Govinda's part. At the same time, there have been varying and contradictory claims and news regarding the relations between Govinda and his wife Sunita.

Govinda has four nephews and three nieces who have been active in entertainment industry: actor Vinay Anand, mostly in Bhojpuri cinema; comedian Krishna Abhishek; actor Aryan, who had a solitary unsuccessful film before retiring from movies; actresses Ragini Khanna, Soumya Seth and Aarti Singh as well director Janmendra Kumar Ahuja (alias Dumpy), son of his brother Kirti Kumar. Govinda's brother-in-law, Devendra Sharma, has appeared in several Hindi films. Additionally, actor Arjun Singh, who had a short film career, is the son of his sister-in-law.

Govinda was seriously injured on 5 January 1994 while travelling to a studio for the shooting of Khuddar. The actor's car collided with another car, and he sustained head injuries. Although he was bleeding profusely, Govinda did not cancel the shoot; after seeing a doctor, he worked until midnight.

== Controversies ==
=== Junior actor slap case ===
In January 2008, Govinda slapped a struggling actor, Santosh Rai, on the sets of Money Hai Toh Honey Hai at Filmistan Studio in Mumbai. Rai filed a complaint, which eventually reached the Supreme Court of India after lower courts dismissed the case for lack of evidence. In December 2015, the Supreme Court asked Govinda to apologise and settle the matter out of court within two weeks. Govinda stated that he "respects" the court's decision and would respond once he received it in writing.

=== Avatar claims ===
Govinda has claimed that he was offered Sam Worthington's role in the 2009 film Avatar, directed by James Cameron, and suggested the film's title. He said he refused the role because he did not want to paint his body blue, despite the film using CGI. His claims were widely mocked on social media. Neither Cameron nor any member of the Avatar team confirmed these claims. Former CBFC chief and producer Pahlaj Nihalani stated that Govinda confused it with his own unfinished Hindi film of the same name.

=== Career decline and criticism ===
Govinda's decline in box-office prominence has been attributed to numerous factors, including superstition, habitual tardiness, and a general lack of discipline. Producer Pahlaj Nihalani said he became increasingly superstitious on sets and was often late, which created uncertainty for producers. Reports also highlight that he frequently worked on multiple films simultaneously, declined several major projects, and did not adapt to changing audience tastes. His involvement in politics, including a term as a Member of Parliament, is also noted as contributing to reduced acting output.

== Awards and recognition ==
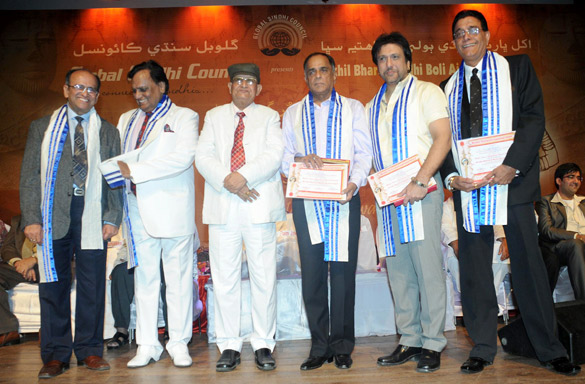
Govinda (second from right) at the 2012 Mother Teresa Awards

In 1999, Govinda was voted the world's tenth-greatest star of stage or screen in a BBC News Online poll. In July 2016, he was recognised as Actor of the Decade at the India Leadership Conclave in Mumbai.

Govinda has received 12 Filmfare Award nominations and 4 Zee Cine Awards. He has also received a Filmfare Awards for Best Performance in a Comic Role for Haseena Maan Jayegi (1999) and a Filmfare Special Award for Saajan Chale Sasural (1996).
