= Tan-Badan =

- Directed by: Anand
- Produced by: Anand
- Starring: Govinda; Khushbu; Viju Khote
- Cinematography: Shashikant Kabre
- Edited by: Subhash Gupta
- Music by: Anand–Milind
- Release date: 25 April 1986
- Country: India
- Language: Hindi

Tan-Badan is a 1986 Bollywood film starring Govinda and Khushbu. Although Love 86 and Ilzaam released before this film, this movie is Govinda's debut, directed by his maternal uncle (and his wife's brother-in-law) Anand Singh.

== Cast ==
- Govinda... Ravi Pratap
- Khushbu... Gauri
- Iftekhar...Ravi Dad/Diwan Devendra Pratap
- Satyen Kappu...Karim Chacha
- Viju Khote... Road rowdy goon
- Sharat Saxena...Janga
- Raj Mehra...Thakur Shamsher Singh
- Leela Mishra...Mausi/Dadi
- Vijay Kashyap...Doctor
- Guddi Maruti.... Doctor's wife
- Ram Sethi...Dinu, Driver

== Songs ==
The music was composed by Anand–Milind. This was their first film with actor Govinda. The duo went on to do around 19 films with the actor, most of which were chartbusters. Lyrics were penned by Sameer.

1. "Lage Na Mora Jiya, Gale Lag Jaa" – Anuradha Paudwal, Suresh Wadkar
2. "Biwi Hasband Ko Pyar Na Kare" – Suresh Wadkar, Alka Yagnik
3. "Kisi Ko Mai Aisi Lagti Hu" – Alka Yagnik
4. "Krishna Krishna" – Udit Narayan
5. "Mai Bhi Jawan Hu, Tu Bhi Jawan Hai" – Sharon Prabhakar
