= Khullam Khulla Pyaar Karen =

- Khullam Khulla Pyaar Karen DVD cover
- Directed by: Harmesh Malhotra
- Written by: Anwar Khan; Praful Parekh; Rajeev Kaul
- Produced by: Tutu Sharma
- Starring: Govinda; Preity Zinta
- Cinematography: H. Laxminarayan
- Edited by: Govind Dalwadi
- Music by: Anand–Milind
- Distributed by: Padmini Telemedia; Tutu Films
- Release date: 28 April 2005
- Running time: 155 minutes
- Language: Hindi

Khullam Khulla Pyaar Karen (transl. I will love you openly) is a 2005 Indian Hindi-language comedy film directed by Harmesh Malhotra starring Govinda and Preity Zinta. Despite being completed in 2002, the film was met with many delays after which it was finally released in 2005. The film was Harmesh Malhotra's last film before his death and was a box-office failure.

== Synopsis ==
Damini (Prem Chopra) and Goverdhan (Kader Khan) are bitter enemies but when they get word from their boss Trikal Annaa (Sadashiv Amrapurkar) to stop the rivalry, they are forced to shake hands. They soon decide to get their children married to each other. Goverdhan tells his son Vicky (Mohnish Behl) to go to Surat to meet Damini's daughter Preeti (Preity Zinta).

Whilst going to Surat, Vicky offers a lift to Raja (Govinda) but the car has an accident and falls into the river. Some people manage to rescue Raja but not Vicky. Using this as an advantage and knowing about Vicky's purpose, he poses himself as Vicky and makes his way to Surat. He meets Preeti and falls in love with her. At first when Preeti meets Raja (under the guise of Vicky), she hates him but soon she falls in love with him. Goverdhan soon gets word that Vicky has met Preeti and both have agreed to marry.

Then to his shock, the real Vicky comes home and announces that he never made it to Surat and he did not meet Preeti. Goverdhan makes his way to Surat to find out who is there posing as his son...

== Cast ==
- Govinda as Raja Khanna
- Preity Zinta as Preeti Damini
- Satish Kaushik as Sindhi
- Sadashiv Amrapurkar as Supremo / Trikal Anna
- Prem Chopra as Damini Sharma
- Kader Khan as Goverdhan
- Mohnish Behl as Vicky
- Himani Shivpuri as Goverdhan's wife
- Johnny Lever as Gangster Pasha Bhai
- Asrani as Pandit
- Razak Khan as Goverdhan's Brother in law
- Veeru Krishnan as Sindhi's customer

== Soundtrack ==
The film's music was composed by Anand–Milind.

Title	Singer(s)
Khullam Khulla Pyaar Karen	Jolly Mukherjee, Sunidhi Chauhan
Bachalo Bachalo	Sonu Nigam, Alka Yagnik
Tere Ishq Mein Pad Gaye Re	Sonu Nigam, Jaspinder Narula
Challa Challa	Sudesh Bhosle
Bagalwalee Aankh Mare	Udit Narayan, Jaspinder Narula
Mare Najar Se Kataree	Sonu Nigam, Alka Yagnik
Yeh Ladakee Nahee, Yeh Banaras Kaa Pan Hai	Sonu Nigam, Bela Sulakhe
