= Raja Babu (film) =

1994 Indian Hindi film by David Dhawan

- Poster
- Directed by: David Dhawan
- Screenplay by: K. Bhagyaraj; Anees Bazmee (Dialogues)
- Based on: Rasukutty (Tamil) by K. Bhagyaraj
- Produced by: Nandu G. Tolani
- Starring: Govinda; Karisma Kapoor; Shakti Kapoor
- Cinematography: Rajan Kinagi
- Edited by: A. Muthu
- Music by: Anand–Milind
- Distributed by: Sapna Arts
- Release date: 21 January 1994 (India)
- Running time: 161 minutes
- Country: India
- Language: Hindi
- Budget: ₹2.30 crore (Note: Figure contains print and advertising costs)
- Box office: ₹15.26 crore

Raja Babu is a 1994 Indian Hindi-language melodrama comedy film directed by David Dhawan. It stars Govinda, Karisma Kapoor, Shakti Kapoor, Kader Khan, Aruna Irani, Prem Chopra and Gulshan Grover, with music by Anand–Milind and lyrics by Sameer. The film was inspired from the 1992 Tamil film Rasukutty. The film was a blockbuster hit.

== Plot ==
Raja Singh a.k.a. Raja Babu is the sole heir to a rich village couple. He is good-hearted but is also spoilt, unsophisticated, and uneducated. Lakhan pretends to be an ally of Raja's rich father but is secretly embezzling funds. He also creates problems for Raja and his family.

Raja regularly visits the village photo studio and gets his picture taken, each time wearing a different outfit. He is always accompanied by his sidekick Nandu. He falls for Madhubala "Madhu" when he sees her photograph in the studio.

He harasses Madhu so that he can get her attention. Madhu becomes annoyed with Raja's antics and comes to his village with her entourage. In the ensuing confusion they mistake one of Raja's neighbours as Raja, Madhu's entourage kidnaps him and takes him back to their village. Later, Madhu sees one of Raja's photos as a Lawyer and mistakes his costume as the real thing. She agrees to marry him but accidentally finds out that Raja is not only not a lawyer, he is also completely illiterate. Enraged at this perceived duplicity, she rushes to Raja's house, tears up their wedding invitations, and insults Raja's father.

Raja still wants to marry Madhu, but his father refuses to grant him permission and tries to compel him to quickly marry a mentally challenged girl to save his family's honour. Raja refuses as he loves Madhu and ends up insulting the girl's parents. Angered at this insult, the girl's mother reveals a big secret regarding Raja's origins. He is actually not his parents' biological child, rather he was an orphan found on the steps of a mandir (Hindu temple), and subsequently adopted by his parents.

Raja becomes overwhelmed with gratitude and decides to do as his father says. In the meantime, Madhu understands that Raja did not deceive her and it was all a misunderstanding. She forgives him and declares her love for him. But Raja tells her about his changed situation and asks her to forget him. Madhu refuses to listen to him and pursues him anyway.

Raja's father misunderstands his son's intentions and kicks him out for breaking his promise of no longer seeing Madhu. Taking advantage of this tense situation, Lakhan plans to kill Raja's entire family and take control of their property. He along with his son Banke kidnaps Raja's parents. Raja rushes to rescue them. After a long fight, he manages to defeat his family's enemies. His father finally understands his son's deep love and respect for him and agrees to let him unite with Madhu.

== Cast ==
- Govinda as Raja Singh aka Raja Babu; Madhu's husband
- Karishma Kapoor as Madhubala "Madhu" Singh; Raja's wife
- Shakti Kapoor as Nandu; Raja's friend and servant
- Kader Khan as Kishen Singh; Raja's foster father
- Aruna Irani as Janki Singh; Raja's foster mother
- Prem Chopra as Lakhan Singh; Kishen Singh's brother
- Gulshan Grover as Banke Singh
- Yunus Parvez as Lala Sukhiram
- Kanchan as Radha, Madhu's sister
- Sameer Khakhar as Amavas Singh
- Vikas Anand as Mohan Singh, Madhu's dad
- Arun Bakshi as Chandra Mohan
- Beena Banerjee as Mrs Shanti Mohan
- Shashi Kiran as Photographer Sadanand
- Dina Pathak as Bansi's Mother
- K. K. Raj as Bansi
- Mahavir Shah as Police Inspector Arvind Mehta
- Sudhir as Police Inspector Jaichand
- Javed Khan as Postman and writer Ram Singh

== Box office ==
Made on a budget of ₹2.30 crore, Raja Babu was blockbuster success at box office, managing to gross ₹15.26 crore worldwide.

== Soundtrack ==
The soundtrack of Raja Babu (1994), composed by Anand-Milind with lyrics by Sameer, features a blend of romantic, playful, and folk-inspired tracks that complement the film's comedic and melodramatic tone. Released on 21 January 1994, the album consists of seven songs performed by renowned playback singers such as Abhijeet, Poornima, Kumar Sanu, Udit Narayan, Kavita Krishnamurthy, and Vinod Rathod.

#	Title	Singer(s)
1.	"Pak Chik Pak Raja Babu"	Vinod Rathod, Jolly Mukherjee & Anand
2.	"Ho Sarkay Leo Khattiya Jaada Lage"	Kumar Sanu, Poornima
3.	"Aaja Aaja Yaad Sataye	Udit Narayan, Kavita Krishnamurthy
4.	"Aa Aa E Ooh Ooh Ooh Mera Dil Na Todo" (Male)	Abhijeet
5.	"Aiya Aiya Aiya Masti Chha Gayi"	Poornima
6.	"Hey Ooi Amma Ooi Amma"	Poornima
7.	"Aa Aa E Ooh Ooh Ooh Mera Dil Na Todo" (Female)	Poornima

== Awards ==
40th Filmfare Awards:

Won

- Best Comedian – Shakti Kapoor
