= Chal Mere Bhai =

2000 Indian film by David Dhawan

- Directed by: David Dhawan
- Written by: Rumi Jaffrey (Dialogues)
- Screenplay by: Ikram Akhtar; Yunus Sejawal
- Story by: Ikram Akhtar
- Produced by: Nitin Manmohan
- Starring: Sanjay Dutt; Salman Khan; Karishma Kapoor
- Cinematography: Harmeet Singh
- Edited by: A. Muthu
- Music by: Anand–Milind; Nitin Raikwar
- Distributed by: Gaurav Digital; Neha Arts; Eros International
- Release date: 5 May 2000
- Running time: 133 minutes
- Country: India
- Language: Hindi
- Budget: ₹14 crore
- Box office: ₹22.28 crore

Chal Mere Bhai (transl. Come on, brother) is a 2000 Indian Hindi-language comedy film produced by Nitin Manmohan and directed by David Dhawan. It stars Sanjay Dutt, Salman Khan and Karishma Kapoor.

== Plot ==
Chal Mere Bhai follows two brothers, Vikram "Vicky" Oberoi (Sanjay Dutt) and Prem Oberoi (Salman Khan), whose lives are turned upside down by Sapna (Karisma Kapoor).

Vicky is a successful business tycoon who manages his family's vast business empire. Sapna, an orphan who has recently moved from Pune to Bombay and lives with her uncle and aunt, applies to become his secretary. Despite lacking the necessary experience, she impresses Vicky's father, Balraj Oberoi (Dalip Tahil), with her enthusiasm, and he hires her.

Prem aspires to become an actor, much to Balraj's dismay, as he wants his younger son to join the family business. However, Prem's grandmother (Sushma Seth) and Vicky support his ambitions. Prem works with Sapna's uncle (Shakti Kapoor), a theatre director.

Sapna's clumsiness and inefficiency frequently frustrate Vicky, but she proves her worth when her quick thinking saves his life during an attack after work. Grateful, Vicky's family invite Sapna and her relatives to their farmhouse for a short holiday. The family grows fond of Sapna, and she and Prem fall in love.

Before Prem can confess his feelings to his family, he discovers that his grandmother wants Vicky to marry Sapna and that Vicky has accepted the proposal. Vicky has long mourned his late girlfriend, Piya (Sonali Bendre), and Prem does not want to jeopardise his brother's happiness now that he is ready to move on. To avoid hurting Vicky, Prem falsely tells Sapna that he was merely playing with her feelings. Heartbroken, Sapna succumbs to pressure from her aunt and uncle and agrees to marry Vicky.

Before the wedding, however, Vicky discovers the truth and confronts the couple. Sapna and Prem are ultimately reunited. The final scene suggests that Vicky may also find love again when a new employee, Pooja (Twinkle Khanna), joins his office.

== Cast ==
- Sanjay Dutt as Vikram "Vicky" Oberoi
- Salman Khan as Prem Oberoi
- Karishma Kapoor as Sapna Mehra
- Dalip Tahil as Balraj Oberoi
- Sushma Seth as Dadima, Vicky and Prem's grandmother.
- Shakti Kapoor as Mamaji, Sapna's uncle.
- Ravi Baswani as Waiter in a guest appearance
- Anil Dhawan as Doctor in hospital
- Himani Shivpuri as Mamiji, Sapna's aunt.
- Shahbaz Khan as Rakesh
- Javed Khan as Murari
- Asrani as Family Dr PK Bhandari
- Nagma as Sonia (guest appearance)
- Shankar Mahadevan as himself in the title sequence.
- Lesle Lewis as himself in the title sequence.
- Sonali Bendre as Piya, Vicky's beloved who died in an accident (guest appearance)
- Twinkle Khanna as Pooja (guest appearance)
- Birbal as Astrologer Karan Saxena
- Ghanshyam Rohera as Nandu, the cook
- Shashi Kiran as Sadanand Suri
- Masshe Uddin Qureshi
- Dinesh Anand
- Suresh Bhagwat
- Divya Palat in song Mehndi Rang Laayi (guest appearance)

== Soundtrack ==
Chal Mere Bhai

Soundtrack album by Anand–Milind
- Released: 1999
- Genre: Feature film soundtrack
- Length: 47:07
- Label: T-Series
- Producer: Anand–Milind

Anand–Milind chronology
Shikaar (2000)	Chal Mere Bhai (1999)	Chhupa Rustam: A Musical Thriller (2000)

According to the Indian trade website Box Office India, with around 12,00,000 units sold, this film's soundtrack was the year's fifteenth highest-selling.

All lyrics are written by Nitin Raikwar, Sameer; all music is composed by Anand–Milind The music featured in the top 15 best selling albums of 2000.

Songs
No.	Title	Playback	Length
1.	"Aaj Kal Ki Ladkiyan"	Sonu Nigam, Vinod Rathod, Poornima, Vaijanti	6:35
2.	"Chal Mere Bhai"	Sanjay Dutt, Salman Khan	5:00
3.	"Chal Mere Bhai" (Remix)	Shankar Mahadevan, Lesle Lewis, Dominique	4:20
4.	"Chori Chori Sapno Mein"	Abhijeet Bhattacharya, Alka Yagnik	5:03
5.	"Chori Chori Sapno Mein" (Sad)	Abhijeet Bhattacharya, Alka Yagnik	1:08
6.	"Mehndi Rang Layee"	Udit Narayan, Sonu Nigam, Alka Yagnik, Jaspinder Narula	6:49
7.	"Mere Baap Ki Beti"	Abhijeet Bhattacharya, Vinod Rathod	4:40
8.	"Meri Neend Jaane Lagi Hai"	Alka Yagnik, Sonu Nigam	5:30
9.	"Thodi Si Beqarari"	Kumar Sanu and Alka Yagnik	4:39
10.	"Theme Music" (Instrumental)	–	3:23
Total length:			47:07

== Reception ==
Sharmila Taliculam of Rediff.com wrote that "Chal Mere Bhai is supposed to deliver a message on love, brotherhood, sacrifice and family values. But really, do you want to sit through another one? I suppose not. In that case, you can comfortably give this a miss". Taran Adarsh of IndiaFM gave the film 1 star out of 5, writing opined that "Director David Dhawan should've chosen a better script to work on. Those going to watch a typical David Dhawan kind of a masala film are bound to be disappointed this time. The film lacks in substance, which is its biggest flaw.At the box-office, CHAL MERE BHAI has weak merits and will find the going tough."
