= Samaira Sandhu =

Indian film actress

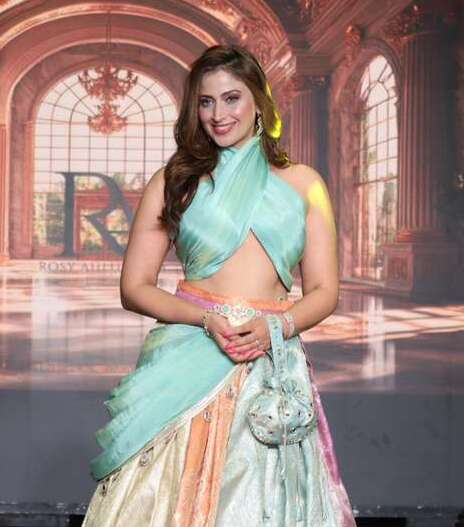
- Samaira Sandhu on a walking ramp in Chicago, USA in 2026
- Born: Samaira Sandhu; Chandigarh
- Occupation: Actress
- Known for: Dhayam, Bharateeyans

Samaira Sandhu is an Indian film actress and model. She is best known for her films Dhayam, Bharateeyans and "Umran Ch Ki Rakheya".

In 2023, Samaira Sandhu was nominated as Brand ambassador for "Nasha Mukt Bharat Abhiyaan", Chandigarh.

In February 2024, Samaira Sandhu has been announced as State Icon for Lok Sabha elections 2024.

== Film career ==
In 2017, Samaira started her film career from Tamil film Dhayam which was directed by Kannan Rangaswamy.

In 2022, Samaira worked in the Deena Raj directed Bharateeyans. The film was funded by a US based doctor Shankar Naidu Adusumilli. The teaser was launched by Vivek Agnihotri.

In 2022, she worked with Neel Bhattacharya in a short film which is based on autism. In the same year she has acted alongside Krushal Ahuja in a music album sung by Javed Ali.

=== Philanthrophy ===
Samaira is associated with Fit India Movement and is brand ambassador of two NGOs, Chandigarh Round Table (CRT) and Handicapped Children and Women Association (HCWA). She is also active for women empowerment and nighttime safety awareness.

Samaira distributed Sanitary pads for needy women during 2025 Punjab, India floods.

== Filmography ==
- Dhayam (2017)
- Damayanthi (2021)
- Umran Ch Ki Rakheya (2022)
- Aliya (2022) opposite to Neel Bhattacharya
- Bharateeyans (2023)
- Inspector Avinash (2023) as Journalist Zara Baig

== Music videos ==
Year	Album	Music Video	Singer	Role
2016	MAUT - In Search of Love	Sohn rabb di main	Jaspinder Narula	Actress
2017	Heer Saleti	Heer Saleti	Pammi Bai	Actress
2017	BOLO MAA	Mai meri Maa ki		Actress
2023	Kehange Khalnayak	Kehange Khalnayak Babbu Maan	Babbu Maan	Actress
2023	Laazmi	Laazmi	Javed Ali	Actress
2024	Awaaz	Awaaz	Babbu Maan	Actress

== Bibliography ==
Samaira Sandhu wrote a book Heaven in a Hell which is based on drug addiction. It was published in 2016.

== Awards ==
- Passion Vista Glamour and Style award 2024 for Stellar Performance in cinematic Excellence
- SRICA 2024 - BEST ACTRESS Bharateeyans
- Jashn-E-Inquilab by Midday 2024- Iconic picture perfect face of the year
