= Bharateeyans =

2023 Indian Telugu-language action film

- Theatrical release poster
- Directed by: Deena Raj
- Written by: Deena Raj
- Produced by: Shankar N Adusumilli
- Starring: Nirroze Putcha, Samaira Sandhu, Subha Ranjan, Peden O Namgyal, Sonam Thendup Barphungpa, Rajeswari Chakraborty
- Cinematography: Jayapal Reddy Nimmala
- Edited by: Shiva Sarvani Suyash Pachauri
- Music by: Satya Kashyap
- Production company: Bharat American Creations
- Release date: 14 July 2023
- Country: India
- Language: Hindi

Bharateeyans is a 2023 Indian Hindi-language action film written and directed by Deena Raj. The film features actors from across India such as Nirroze Putcha, Subha Ranjan, Sonam Thendup Barphungpa, Samaira Sandhu, Peden O Namgyal and Rajeswari Chakraborty in lead roles, and is Produced by Shankar N Adusumilli under his "Bharat American Creations" banner while Satya Kashyap is composing the music and cinematography by Jayapal Reddy Nimmala. The First look and Teaser of the film were launched on 13 August 2022, In the presence of Vivek Agnihotri the director of film The Kashmir Files and the film was expected to release on 14 July 2023.

The story of 'Bharateeyans' revolves around a group of six youngsters who belong to various regions of India. The film is said to evoke Patriotism in the younger generation of India, Vivek Agnihotri added "It's an earnest tribute to every Indian with a solid message on Patriotism and perseverance, "Bharateeyans" will bring a new identity to the word "Indians".

== Plot ==
Six strangers, three men, three women meet at unknown place. They don't know each other. They start their journey without knowing what dangers are waiting for them. Plot revolves around love, family, action and patriotism.

== Cast ==
- Nirroze Putcha as Telugu
- Subha Ranjan as Bhojpuri
- Sonam Thendup Barphunga as Nepali
- Samaira Sandhu as Punjabi
- Peden O Namgyal as Tripuri
- Rajeswari Chakraborty as Bengali
- Suyash Pachauri
- Phurba Lama
- Mahendra Bagdas
- Sujata
- Anupam

== Production ==
Dr. Shankar Naidu, a well-known surgeon, who has established multiple organizations such as Carolina Colorectal Surgery Group, Apollo Urgent Care, and co-founded Bharat Today, Nationalist Hub before collaborating with Writer Deena Raj, who previously wrote industry hit films like Preminchukundam Raa, Premante Idera, Kalisundam Raa, Eeswar (2002 film), Lahiri Lahiri Lahirilo, Sardukupodaam Randi, Nagaram Nidrapotunna Vela and Sakhiya. Bharateeyans will be Deena Raj's directorial debut. Bharateeyans went into production in February and wrapped in March 2022, the film was shot in multiple locations such as Kalimpong, Gangtok, Rangpo, NHPC Dam, Chalsa, West Bengal and the climax was shot at Sikkim.

== Soundtrack ==
The music is composed by Satya Kashyap who previously worked on films like Iravatham, Law, Kanayya.

Bharateeyans

Soundtrack album by Satya Kashyap
- Recorded: 2023
- Genre: Soundtrack
- Producer: Satya Kashyap

Track list
No.	Title	Lyrics	Singer(s)	Length
1.	"Main Aaraha Hoon"	Vipin Das	Vishal Mishra, Soumee Sailesh
2.	"Sare Jahase Accha"	Dr. Sagar	Amruta Fadnavis
3.	"We are Bharateeyans"	Piyush Ambore	Piyush Ambore

== Critical reception ==
A critic from NTV rated the film 2.5/5 stars. A critic from Sakshi gave the film 2.5/5 stars. Dhaval Roy of The Times of India rated the film 1/5 stars and wrote, "The performances are way below average, though the action is passable. Overall, an unconvincing story, insipid narrative, and over-the-top performances fail to evoke emotion of any kind." Prakash Pecheti of The South First gave it 0.5/5 stars and wrote, "More than igniting love and a sense of attachment towards the country, Bharateeyans makes you embarrassed, as it is deduced to become a travesty of nationalism."
