= Akhiyon Se Goli Maare =

2002 Indian Hindi film by Harmesh Malhotra

- Directed by: Harmesh Malhotra
- Written by: Anwar Khan (Dialogues)
- Screenplay by: Praful Parekh; Rajeev Kaul
- Story by: Praful Parekh; Rajeev Kaul
- Produced by: Harmesh Malhotra
- Starring: Govinda; Raveena Tandon
- Cinematography: Shyam Shilposkar
- Edited by: Govind Dalwadi
- Music by: Songs: Anand–Milind; Daboo Malik; Dilip Sen-Sameer Sen; Background Score: Sanjoy Chowdhury
- Production company: Eastern Films
- Release date: 2 August 2002
- Running time: 144 minutes
- Country: India
- Language: Hindi

Akhiyon Se Goli Maare (transl. Shoots with the Eyes) is a 2002 Indian Hindi-language comedy film, directed by Harmesh Malhotra, starring Govinda, Raveena Tandon, Kader Khan, Shakti Kapoor, Asrani and Johnny Lever. The film was released on 2 August 2002. The name of the film is taken from the song of the same name from the 1998 movie Dulhe Raja, also starring the same cast.

== Plot ==
Akhilender aka Bhangari Dada has a shop at Chor Bazaar, which he runs illegally. He lives with his wife and only daughter, Kiran. Bhangari wants his daughter to be married to a gangster, so he begins his search. He finds Shakti Dada and wants him to be married to Kiran, but Kiran already loves Raj, a wealthy man who has no links to crime. But to satisfy her dad, she persuades Raj to pose as a gangster for the time being. For this, they search for a trainer called Subramaniam, who teaches Raj to act as a gangster. Finally, Raj becomes successful in posing as a gangster, but Bhangari's dad somehow appears and doesn't want Kiran to marry a gangster. Will Raj be able to clean up his image?

== Cast ==
- Govinda as Raj Oberoi / Bobdeya Dada
- Raveena Tandon as Kiran Kapoor (Fake Name) / Kiran Bhangari
- Kader Khan as Aklinder Gadewal "Topichand Bhangari" / Rana Bheeshmbar Pratap Gadewal (Bhangari's father)
- Asrani as Topichand's brother-in-law
- Johnny Lever as Master Subramaniam
- Avtar Gill as Thomson
- Dinesh Hingoo as Shaadilal
- Razzak Khan as Faiyaz Takkar Pehelwan
- Satyen Kappu as Magistrate Kapoor
- Shakti Kapoor as Shakti Dada
- Tiku Talsania as Mr. Oberoi
- Viju Khote as Chorge
- Sharat Saxena as Babu Chhapri
- Beena as Mrs. Oberoi
- Ghanashyam Rohera as Constable Dhanche
- Rana Jung Bahadur as Jerry
- Anjana Mumtaz as Sulekha Bhangari
- Veeru Krishnan
- Rajlaxmi Solanki as Advocate

== Soundtrack ==
Music composed by Anand-Milind, Daboo Malik and Dilip Sen-Sameer Sen.

Songs
No.	Title	Lyrics	Music	Singer(s)	Length
1.	"Akkh Jo Tujh Se Lad Gayi Hai"	Dev Kohli	Anand–Milind	Sonu Nigam, Jaspinder Narula
2.	"Dehradun Ka Chuna Lagaya"	Salim Bijnauri	Daboo Malik	Vinod Rathod, Sunidhi Chauhan
3.	"Gore Tan Se Sarakta Jaye"	Sameer	Anand–Milind	Sonu Nigam, Alka Yagnik, Sanjeevani
4.	"Ladki Mud Mud Ke Maare"	Sameer	Anand–Milind	Vinod Rathod, Alka Yagnik
5.	"Maine Tujhe Dekha"	Sameer	Anand–Milind	Sonu Nigam, Alka Yagnik
6.	"O Chhori Gori Gori"	Sameer	Anand–Milind	Sonu Nigam, Jaspinder Narula
7.	"Rabba O Rabba"	Dev Kohli	Anand–Milind	Udit Narayan, Alka Yagnik
8.	"Thumka Lagake Naachlo"	Nitin Raikwar	Dilip Sen-Sameer Sen	Sonu Nigam, Vinod Rathod, Sanjeevani

== Box office ==
The movie was a box-office bomb, collecting only 3.1 crores.

== Reception ==
Sify gave the film a rating of 3 out of 5 calling it "a very average film" with no department of filmmaking standing out, except for some funny dialogues. Taran Adarsh of Bollywood Hungama said, "Harmesh Malhotra's Akhiyon Se Goli Maare falls in the genre of light entertainers", giving it a 1.5 out of 5 stars. The Times of India says, "While provision has to be made for suspension of disbelief in popular entertainment, this one stretches beyond belief and endurance too".

== Awards and nominations ==
- Nominated – Filmfare Award for Best Performance in a Comic Role - Govinda
