= Jaspinder Narula =

Indian singer

Dr. Jaspinder Narula
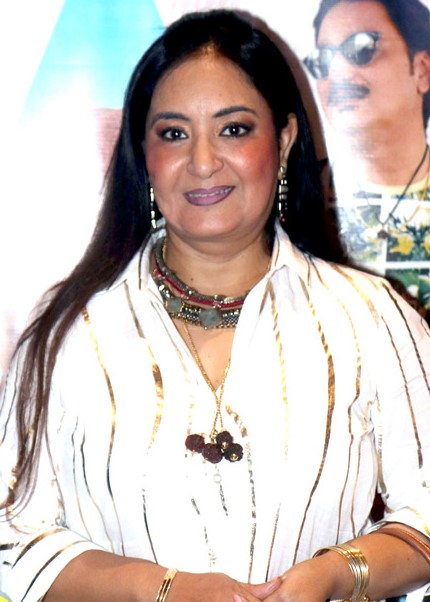
- Narula at the special screening of Mr. Kabaadi

Background information
- Born: 14 November 1970 (age 56)
- Genres: Punjabi music, religious music, Bollywood music
- Occupation: Playback singer
- Instrument: Vocals
- Years active: 1994–2014

Jaspinder Narula (born 14 November 1970) is an Indian singer of playback, classical and Sufi music. She is known for her work in Hindi and Punjabi cinema. She shot to fame after the duet "Pyaar To Hona Hi Tha" with Remo Fernandes from the 1998 film Pyaar To Hona Hi Tha for which she won the 1999 Filmfare Award for Best Female Playback Singer. The other notable films she has sung in include Mission Kashmir, Mohabbatein, Phir Bhi Dil Hai Hindustani and Bunty Aur Babli. She is also a singer of Sufi music, as well as Gurbani and other Sikh religious music. She has sung in a Hindi Music video "Maula Ali Ali" with Mudasir Ali. In 2008, she won the title of India's Best Live Performer in the NDTV Imagine singing reality series, Dhoom Macha De (2008).

In January 2025, Narula was honored with the Padma Shri, India's fourth-highest civilian award, by the Government of India.

== Early life and education ==
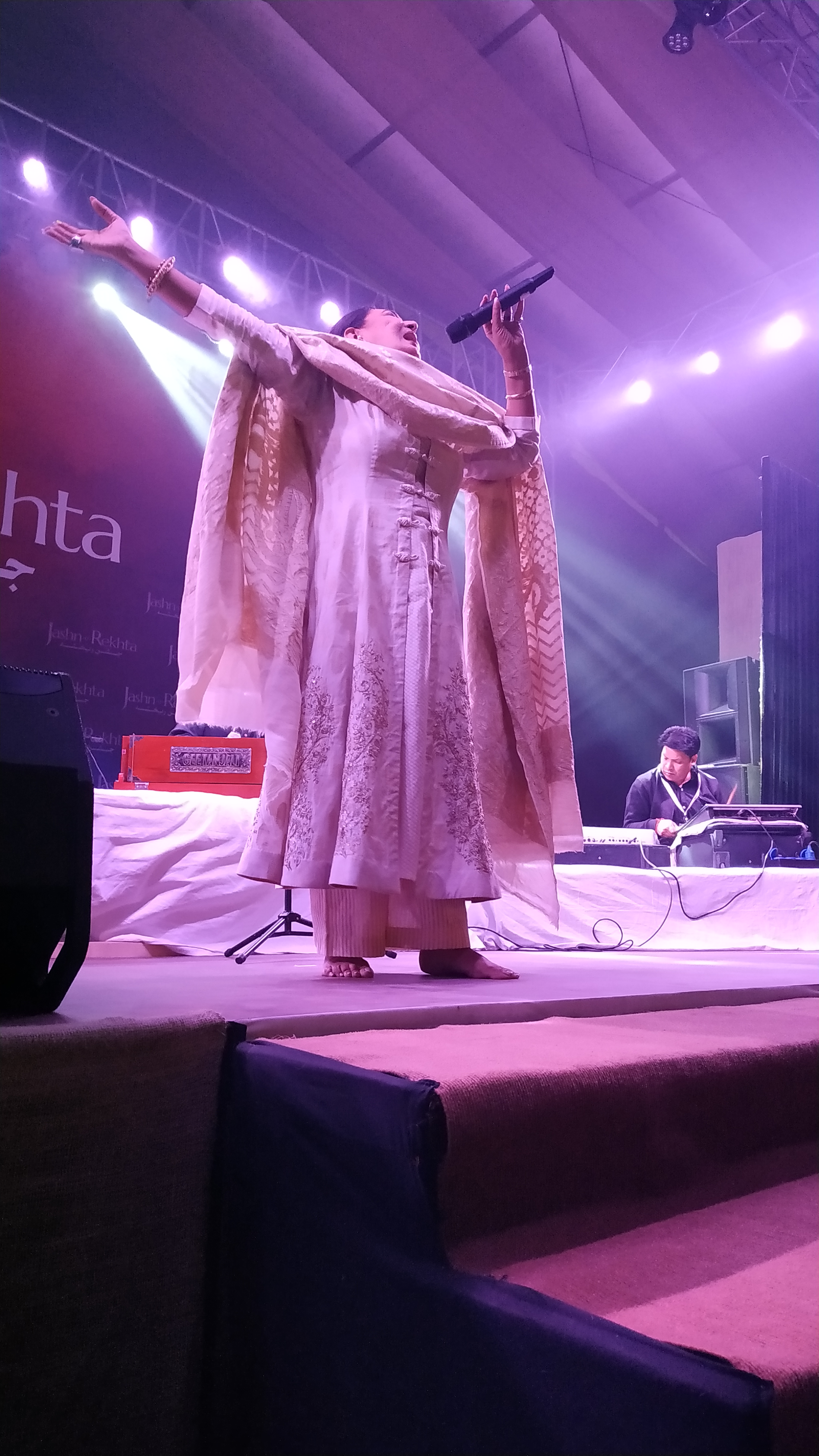
Jaspinder Narula at Jashn-e-Rekhta 2019

Jaspinder Narula was born into a musical family. Her father, Kesar Singh Narula, was a music composer active during the 1950s. She received her initial training in music under his guidance. She later continued her studies under Ustad Ghulam Sadiq Khan of the Rampur-Sahaswan gharana, further developing her foundation in classical music. Narula did her schooling from Guru Harkishan Public School, India Gate, New Delhi and completed her B.A Hons in Music from Indraprastha College for Women, where she was admitted as a special case because she did not have Music as a subject in class 12th which was pre-requisite for admission in the course. She finished her PhD in Hindustani classical music from Delhi University in 2008.

== Personal life ==
She lives in Mumbai, and is married to a Media Consultant from Delhi.

== Career ==
Initially, Jaspinder focused on devotional music, including bhajans and Sufi compositions, and did not pursue playback singing in films. She later moved to Mumbai to explore opportunities in music at the advice of noted music director Kalyanji who heard her at the private gathering in Delhi and asked his son and music director, Viju Shah, to give her break in films like Master, Aar Ya Paar and Bade Miyan Chhote Miyan (1998). She excels in singing folk and devotional songs. She has lent her voice to record numerous music albums for a large number of successful Bollywood films like Dulhe Raja, Virasat, Mission Kashmir, Mohabbatein and Bunty aur Babli to name a few.

She joined Aam Aadmi Party in February 2014 but resigned soon after.

== Discography ==
=== Film songs ===
Year	Movie	Song	Music director	Note(s)
1997	Judaai	"Judaai Judaai" "Meri Zindagi Ek Pyaas"	Nadeem–Shravan	
1997	Virasat	"Taare Hain Baraati"	Anu Malik	
1997	Mr. and Mrs. Khiladi	"Hum Total Fida Tumpe"	Anu Malik	
1998	Bade Miyan Chote Miyan	"Dhin Tak Dhin"	Viju Shah	
1998	Dulhe Raja	"Ankhiyon Se Goli Maare"	Anand–Milind	
1998	Pyaar To Hona Hi Tha	"Pyar To Hona Hi Tha"	Jatin–Lalit	Filmfare Award for Best Female Playback Singer
1998	Major Saab	"Sona Sona"	Aadesh Shrivastava	
1998	Soldier	"Tera Rang Balle Balle"	Anu Malik	
1998	Kareeb	"Reet Yahi Jag Ki"	Anu Malik	
1999	Aa Ab Laut Chalen	"Yehi Hai Pyar" "Tere Bin Ek Pal" "Pyar Hua Pyar Hua"	Nadeem–Shravan	
1999	Sirf Tum	"Ek Mulakat Zaruri Hai Sanam"	Nadeem–Shravan	
1999	Dil Kya Kare	"Menu Lagan Lagi"	Jatin–Lalit	
1999	International Khiladi	"Lutiya Gaya"	Aadesh Shrivastava	
1999	Maa Kasam	"Lachke Teri Kamariya"	Anand–Milind	
1999	Arjun Pandit	"Gher Ghaar Ghagro"	Dilip Sen-Sameer Sen	
1999	Anari No.1	"Main Laila" "Main Hoon Ladki Kunwari"	Dilip Sen-Sameer Sen	
1999	Kohram	"Paagal Huwa Huwa Huwa" "Pagal Hua Deewana Hua"	Dilip Sen-Sameer Sen	
1999	Jaanwar	"Mera Yaar Dildaar"	Anand–Milind	
1999	Jaanam Samjha Karo	"Sabki Baaraten Aayeen"	Anu Malik	
1999	Dillagi	"Dillagi Dillagi" "Sangeet"	Shankar–Ehsaan–Loy; Sukhwinder Singh	
1999	Sangharsh	"Manzil Na Koi"	Jatin–Lalit	
1999	Hello Brother	"Hello Brother" "Hata Sawan Ki Ghata"	himesh Reshammiya	
1999	Daag	"Piya Lagi Lagan" "Dil Dhak Dhak Dhadke"	Rajesh Roshan	
1999	Hogi Pyaar Ki Jeet	"Tere Pyar Mein Main" "Aa Gaye Din Sanam" "Lakhon Aashiq Mar Jaate Hai"	Anand–Milind	
1999	Bade Dilwala	"Bhadke Aag Judaai Ki"	Aadesh Shrivastava	
1999	Sooryavansham	"Peepal Ke Patwa" "Chori Se Chori Se"	Anu Malik	
2000	Mission Kashmir	"Bumbroo"	Ehsaan Noorani	
2000	Dhadkan	"Dulhe Ka Sehra"	Nadeem–Shravan	
2000	Mohabbatein	"Soni Soni"	Jatin–Lalit	
2000	Phir Bhi Dil Hai Hindustani	"I Am The Best – Female"	Jatin–Lalit	
2000	Shikari	"Chunri Ude To Aankh Phadke"	Aadesh Shrivastava	
2000	Hadh Kar Di Aapne	"Kudi Kanwaari Tere"	Anand Raj Anand	
2000	Chal Mere Bhai	"Mehndi Rang Layee"	Anand–Milind	
2000	Bichhoo	"Jeevan Mein Jaane Jaana"	Anand Raj Anand	
2000	Badal	"Jugni Jugni" "Tujhe Dekh Ke Dil"	Anu Malik	
2000	Fiza	"Na Leke Jao"	Anu Malik	
2000	Baaghi	"Pyar Pyar"	Sajid–Wajid	
2000	Khauff	"Raja Ki Qaid Mein"	Anu Malik	
2000	Bulandi	"Hungama Ho Jaaye" "Ab Bujho Ri Bujho"	Viju Shah	
2000	Deewane	"Ae Dil" "Ishq Da Gunjal" "Sajna Ne Phool Marya"	Sanjeev–Darshan	
2000	Champion	"Aisa Champion Kahan"	Anu Malik	
2000	Mela	"Mela Dilon Ka" (Celebration)	Anu Malik	
2000	Jayam Manadera (Telugu)	"Hindusthanlo Andarikante"(Duet With Udit Narayan)	Vandemataram Srinivas	
2001	Bhadrachalam (Telugu)	"Cheneta Cheerakatti"(Duet With Kavita Krishnamurthy)	Vandemataram Srinivas	
2001	Pandanti Samsaram (Telugu)	"Ningi Nela"(Duet With Sukhwinder Singh)	Vandemataram Srinivas	
2001	Kyo Kii... Main Jhuth Nahin Bolta	"Ek Ladki Chahiye"	Anand Raj Anand	
2001	Censor	"Yaaron Jo Kal Tak Thay Hum Tum" "Sun Meri Gal" "Aaya Samay"	Jatin–Lalit	
2001	Chori Chori Chupke Chupke	"No. 1 Punjabi" "Dulhan Ghar Aayi" "Mehndi Mehndi"	Anu Malik	
2001	Filhaal	"Sola Singaar" "Waqt Ka Saaya"	Anu Malik	
2001	Yeh Raaste Hain Pyaar Ke	"Yeh Raaste Hain Pyaar Ke"	Sanjeev–Darshan	
2001	Tere Liye	"Halka Halka Paani"	Jeet-Pritam	
2001	Officer	"Don't Break My Heart" "Na Jaane Kyon" "Pari Hoon Main"	Rajesh Roshan	
2002	Deewangee	"Hai Ishq Khata"	Ismail Darbar	
2002	Devdas	"Morey Piya"	Ismail Darbar	
2002	Humraaz	"Life Ban Jaayegi"	Himesh Reshammiya	
2002	Akhiyon Se Goli Maare	"Akkh Jo Tujh Se Lad Gayi Hai" "O Chhori Gori Gori"	Anand–Milind	
2002	Pyaar Diwana Hota Hai	"Pyaar Achha Hota Hai"	Uttam Singh	
2002	Tumko Na Bhool Paayenge	"Mehendi Hai Lagi"	Daboo Malik	
2002	Kyaa Dil Ne Kahaa	"Nikamma"	Himesh Reshammiya	
2002	Mere Yaar Ki Shaadi Hai	"Humne Suna Hai"	Jeet-Pritam	
2002	Na Tum Jaano Na Hum	"Ye Betiyan To Babul Ki"	Rajesh Roshan	
2002	Annarth	"Ankhiyan Na Mila"	Himesh Reshammiya	
2002	Jaani Dushman	"Chal Kudiye"	Anand–Milind	
2003	Indian Babu	"Hum Deewane Hum"	Nadeem–Shravan	
2003	Janasheen	"Deewani Hoon Deewani Hoon"	Anand Raj Anand	
2003	The Hero	"Dil Main Hai Pyar" "Mari Koyal Ne Aisi Cook"	Uttam Singh	
2003	Parwana	"Jo Pallu Gira Diya"	Sanjeev–Darshan	
2003	Pinjar	"Maar Udari" "Darda Marya"	Uttam Singh	
2004	Inssaf	"Chane Ke Khet Mein"	Nikhil-Vinay	
2004	Ek Se Badhkar Ek	"Meri Aankh Nashili"	Sanjeev–Darshan	
2004	Ab Tumhare Hawale Watan Sathiyo	"Mere Sarpe Dupatta"	Anu Malik	Co-sung with Udit Narayan, Alka Yagnik
2004	Suno Sasurjee	"Aa Jaa"	Sanjeev–Darshan	
2004	Agnipankh	"Ishg Ishg Mein" "Rabba"	Pritam	
2005	Khullam Khulla Pyaar Karen	"Tere Ishq Mein Pad Gaye Re" "Bagalwalee Aankh Mare"	Anand–Milind	
2005	Bunty Aur Babli	"Bunty Aur Babli"	Shankar–Ehsaan–Loy	
2005	Yaaran Naal Baharan	"Haan De Munde"	Jaidev Kumar	Punjabi Film
2005	Nishaan	"Tu Qatil Hai"	Das Music	
2005	Chehraa	"Dil Abhi Bhara Nahin"	Anu Malik	
2006	Aap Ki Khatir	"Meethi Meethi Batan"	Himesh Reshammiya	
2006	Kudiyon Ka Hai Zamana	"Kudiyon Ka Hai Zamana"	Iqbal-Yasin	Lyrics-Sahil Sultanpuri
2006	Sandwich	"Bedhadak" "Ek Chumma De Do" "Bedhadak"	Sandeep Chowta; Rajesh Gupta; Rajesh Gupta	
2006	Saawan... The Love Season	"Jo Maangi Khuda Se – 1"	Aadesh Shrivastava	
2007	Apne	"Apne To Apne Hote Hain"	Himesh Reshammiya	
2007	Sarhad Paar	"Mere Rabba O Rabba"	Anand Raj Anand	
2008	Dhoom Dadakka	"Dhoom Dadakka"	Roop Kumar Rathod	
2011	Ek Main Ek Tum	"Tut Gayi Yaariyaan"	Bali Brahmbhatt	
2012	Rahe Chardi Kala Punjab Di	"Gidhe Vich Gedha Laja"	Surinder Bachan	
2012	Rahe Chardi Kala Punjab Di	"Wade Akhan Sachiyan De"	Surinder Bachan	
2014	Chaar Sahibzaade	"Vela Aa Gya Hai"	Jaidev Kumar	

=== Non-film songs ===
Year	Album(s)	Song	Music composer(s)	Lyricist(s)	Note(s)
2000	Sparsh	"Khwaab"	Zubeen Garg	Sumeet Acharya	

== Awards ==
Year	Award	Category	Song	Result
1999	Filmfare Awards	Best Female Playback Singer	"Pyaar To Hona Hi Tha" (from Pyaar To Hona Hi Tha)	Won
1999	Screen Awards	Best Female Playback Singer	"Pyaar To Hona Hi Tha" (from Pyaar To Hona Hi Tha)	Won
