= Veeru Krishnan =

Indian actor and dancer (1959-2019)

- Born: 1959
- Died: 7 September 2019 (aged 59–60); Mumbai, Maharashtra, India
- Occupations: Actor, Dancer

Veeru Krishnan (1959-7 September 2019) was an Indian film actor and Kathak dancer and teacher. He was best known for his roles in Hindi films, ‘’Akele Hum Akele Tum’’, ‘’Raja Hindustani‘’ and ‘’Ishq‘’.

== Biography ==
Krishnan acted in films. He also taught Kathak to actors like Priyanka Chopra, Katrina Kaif, Karanvir Bohra and Athiya Shetty learnt Kathak from him. He acted in films like Akele Hum Akele Tum, Hum Hain Rahi Pyar Ke, Raja Hindustani, Ishq, Dulhe Raja and Kajraare.

Krishnan died in Mumbai on 7 September 2019.

== Selected filmography ==
- Namkeen (1982) as a spectator dancing during Chinki stage dance
- Hum Hain Rahi Pyar Ke (1993) as Natrajan
- Tadipaar (1993)
- Raja (1995) as neighbour
- Akele Hum Akele Tum (1995)
- Raja Hindustani (1996) as Gulab Singh
- Agnee Morcha (1997)
- Ishq (1997)
- Zor (1998) as Municipality worker
- Dulhe Raja (1998) as Dance Master ji
- Pyaar Koi Khel Nahin (1999) as Hijra/Transgender
- Maa Kasam (1999) as Acharya Servant
- Mela (2000) as Ghungroo, the Dance Master
- Kranti (2002) as Police Inspector Ghorpade
- Akhiyon Se Goli Maare (2002)
- Khullam Khulla Pyaar Karen (2005) as Sindhi's customer
- Kajraare (2010)
