= Dulhe Raja =

1998 Indian film by Harmesh Malhotra

- Directed by: Harmesh Malhotra
- Written by: Rajeev Kaul
- Produced by: Harmesh Malhotra
- Starring: Govinda; Raveena Tandon; Kader Khan; Prem Chopra; Johnny Lever; Asrani
- Cinematography: Shyam Rao Shiposkar
- Edited by: Govind Dalwadi
- Music by: Anand–Milind
- Release date: 10 July 1998
- Running time: 160 minutes
- Country: India
- Language: Hindi
- Box office: ₹22.17 crore

Dulhe Raja (transl. Groom king) is a 1998 Indian Hindi-language romantic comedy film starring Govinda, Raveena Tandon, Kader Khan, Johnny Lever, Prem Chopra and Asrani.

== Plot ==
K. K. Singhania, a business tycoon, buys an expensive five-star hotel "Maharaja International" from P. K. Diwani. Later on, Singhania finds that a dhaba inside the hotel complex run by a petty guy Raja acts as a hitch to the earnings of the hotel. Singhania uses multiple ploys to dislodge Raja's dhaba but is outwitted every time. Singhania's daughter Kiran is in love with a man named Rahul. Rahul is financially aided by a confederate, Bishambar Nath. However, Singhania knows that Rahul is a rogue whose pursuit is to lure young women and later abandon them after exploiting their wealth. He warns Kiran not to marry Rahul. He says that Kiran is allowed to marry any man, be he a destitute or Singhania's enemy, without his refusal, except Rahul.

At the same time, Raja develops a fascination for Kiran. Raja, who is already a thorn in Singhania's side, proclaims his love for Kiran before Singhania. He persistently begs Singhania for Kiran's hand in marriage only to be refused by and enraged Singhania. Kiran finds out that Singhania considers Raja his biggest enemy. She starts a mendacious love affair with Raja, gaining the latter's affection. Kiran's plan succeeds when Singhania objects to Raja. Raja thwarts Singhania at every juncture. Singhania decides to marry his daughter to the son of his friend and plans to announce their engagement at her birthday party. However, Raja gatecrashes the party and foils Singhania's plan.

At the party, Kiran declares to Raja that this was all a pretense for her to marry Rahul. Raja warns her of Rahul's true intentions and sides with Singhania. Singhania overhears this conversation and announces that he would marry his daughter to him. Kiran departs for Rahul's home, and Rahul finds it a great opportunity to acquire Singhania's entire wealth as his daughter is now in his custody. He assaults Kiran, confines her in his home and demands Singhania by phone, of his entire wealth and property as a pay-off for his daughter's life.

Raja learns about Rahul's vicious plan and decides to rescue Kiran. He conspires with Singhania to dupe Bishambar of his wealth. He arrives at Rahul's house and hoodwinks him and his accomplices into becoming hostile with one another. Delighted at attaining Singhania's entire assets, Bishambar signs the papers without reading them but later finds that they are not the property papers as he expected, but his confession of kidnapping Kiran and threatening her life. His men snatch away his possessions when police arrive and arrest Rahul, Bishambar and their associates.

== Cast ==
- Govinda as Raja, owner of Dhaba Raja International
- Raveena Tandon as Kiran Singhania
- Anjana Mumtaz as Mrs. Elizabeth Singhania
- Kader Khan as Krishna Kant (K.K.) Singhania, owner of Hotel Maharaja International
- Prem Chopra as Bishambar Nath
- Mohnish Behl as Rahul Sinha
- Johnny Lever as Baankey Lal Chaurasia
- Asrani as Inspector Azgar Singh
- Guddi Maruti as Azgar Singh's Wife
- Dinesh Hingoo as Rukshar Diwani Seth
- Viju Khote as Municipal Commissioner Todnar
- Manmauji as Chhotu
- Sudhir as SSP Nissar Khan
- Veeru Krishnan as Dance Master ji
- Ghanashyam Rohera as Police Constable
- Rana Jung Bahadur as Pitambar Nath
- Anil Nagrath as Sukhiram

== Music ==
Dulhe Raja

Soundtrack album by Anand–Milind
- Released: 8 June 1998
- Genre: Feature film soundtrack
- Label: T-Series

Songs of the film were scored by Anand–Milind who presented some remarkably striking numbers for the album. The frisky "Suno Sasurjee Ab Zidd Chhodo" became significantly popular, followed by "Ankhiyon Se Goli Maare", picturised on Govinda and Raveena Tandon, which is pretty identical to the perky romantic songs sought-after at that period, like "Ole Ole" (Yeh Dillagi) and "Husn Hai Suhaana" (Coolie No. 1). In the few years that followed 1998, the film was relayed on some Indian TV channels on which a snippet of the song "Ankhiyon Se Goli Maare" was shown as a trailer of the film. Other songs of the film are pleasant to the ears, but the aforesaid two went on to become the most popular songs of the album. Mention may be made that an instrumental version of the song "Ankhiyon Se Goli Maare" synchronises the credit display at the beginning of the film. The lyrics were created by Sameer.

A song from the film, "Ankhiyon Se Goli Maare", would later become the inspiration for a film of the same name by director Harmesh Maholtra.

=== Soundtrack ===
All lyrics are written by Sameer; all music is composed by Anand–Milind.

Songs
No.	Title	Playback	Length
1.	"Dulhe Raja"	Vinod Rathod, Anuradha Paudwal	5:17
2.	"Ankhiyon Se Goli Maare"	Sonu Nigam, Jaspinder Narula	5:12
3.	"Nighahen Kyon Churaati Hai"	Udit Narayan, Ram Shankar	6:16
4.	"Kahan Raja Bhoj"	Sonu Nigam, Vinod Rathod	8:09
5.	"Kya Lagti Hai Hai Rabba"	Vinod Rathod	5:35
6.	"Aayi Ban Ke Root"	Sonu Nigam, Anuradha Paudwal	5:35
7.	"Ladka Deewana Lage"	Udit Narayan, Anuradha Paudwal	6:00

== Controversy ==
One song from the movie, "Kahan Raja Bhoj, Kahan Gangu Teli", provoked protests from a Nagpur-based organisation, the Vidarbha Teli Samaj Mahasangh, because it offended the members of their community; they wrote a letter of protest to then-Chief Minister Manohar Joshi, condemning the approval given by the state government to the song and calling for it to be banned.

== Remake ==
It was the seventh-highest-grossing film of the year. The movie was remade in Kannada as Shukradeshe in 2001.

== Award ==
Year	Nominee / work	Award	Result
1999	Johnny Lever	Filmfare Award for Best Performance in a Comic Role	Won
1999	Govinda	Zee Cine Award for Best Actor in a Comic Role	Won
