= Future Film Factory International =

Indian film production company

- Company type: Private
- Industry: Film
- Founded: 2015; 11 years ago
- Headquarters: Chennai, Tamil Nadu, India
- Key people: A.R.S. Sunder (owner) P. Thiru (co-producer)
- Products: Film Production

Future Film Factory International Private Limited is an Indian film production company based in Chennai. The company was founded in 2015 by A.R.S. Sunder. The company first produced the film Dhayam starring Santhosh Prathap in 2017.

== Filmography ==
=== Production ===
Year	Title	Cast	Director	Notes
2017	Dhayam	Santhosh Prathap, Jayakumar, Aira Agarval, Aanchal Singh	Kannan Rangaswamy	
