= Sandwich (2006 film) =

2006 Indian film by Anees Bazmee

Sandwich: Double Trouble
- Film Poster
- Directed by: Anees Bazmee
- Written by: Anees Bazmee; Imtiaz Patel
- Produced by: Smita Thackeray
- Starring: Govinda; Raveena Tandon; Mahima Chaudhry
- Cinematography: G. Shyamkumar; Chitti Babu
- Edited by: Suresh Chaturvedi
- Music by: Sandeep Chowta; Aadesh Shrivastav; Sukhwinder Singh
- Production company: Rahul Productions
- Distributed by: Sahara One Motion Pictures
- Release date: 25 August 2006
- Running time: 152 minutes
- Country: India
- Language: Hindi

Sandwich : Double Trouble is a 2006 Indian Hindi-language comedy film starring Govinda in a dual role opposite Raveena Tandon and Mahima Chaudhry. The film is directed by Anees Bazmee. This film was completed in 2003 but was delayed for three years and finally released in 2006. Earlier the title of the movie was "Hum Do Hamara Ek." Due to a delay in releasing, the movie's title was changed to "Sandwich." It received mixed reviews, who appreciated the performance of Govinda, but it got criticised for writing, screenplay, cliched story and VFX, this film was a box office failure. The film was remade in Kannada as Double Decker in 2011 starring Jaggesh.

== Plot ==
Sher Singh, a.k.a. Shekhar (Govinda) a struggling movie scriptwriter, is in love with Nisha (Raveena Tandon). As he goes to Swami Trilokand, who tells him that soon he will marry two women. Sher Singh panics. However, Nisha's wealthy father arranges her marriage to his friend's son Vicky (Rajendranath Zutshi) who has loved Nisha for a very long time. Sher Singh rushes home in response to a telegram to find that his marriage has been arranged with a local village Punjabi girl, Sweety (Mahima Chaudhary) who has loved him since childhood, in return for his sister's marriage to Sweety's brother. Since Sher's sister has a physical disability in her leg, this may be her only chance of finding a good husband. For his sister's sake, therefore, Sher marries Sweety and returns to Mumbai.

Meanwhile, Nisha refuses to marry Vicky and is ready to kill herself. To pacify Nisha, her father forces Sher to marry her. Sher doesn't get a chance to explain about his first marriage. However, after the wedding, he confesses to Nisha's father that he is already married. Nisha's father advises Sher not to tell her anything. Meanwhile, Vicky goes crazy and attempts to kidnap Nisha, as he wants to marry Nisha. In the ensuing struggle, Nisha's father is killed, and then Vicky seemingly dies in an accident; so, Nisha never gets to learn the truth about Sher's bigamy.

7 years later

Sher Singh leads a double life and has one son with each wife. The two sons, Tuktuk Shekhar and Tony Singh, are exact lookalikes. As the boys are admitted to the same school, they, along with their mothers, become friends. Since Sher Singh goes by the name of Shekhar while in Mumbai, he manages to convince his wives that there are two people—Sher Singh and Shekhar; during the daytime he spends with Sweetie and at nighttime with Nisha, bearing a remarkable resemblance. His sons, meanwhile, suspect that something is wrong because of their similarities and keep investigating. When it almost seems like the truth will be out, there is a surprise element in the entry of a second Shekhar with exactly the same face who claims to be Nisha's husband.

Now, Sher Singh can neither confess to being a bigamist nor sit silently as a stranger stays with his wife Nisha. Meanwhile, he is implicated in a murder as well. Finally, it turns out that Vicky is not actually dead, and he has undergone face reconstruction surgery to have the same face as Sher Singh. Vicky wants Nisha and tries to get close to her, but Sher refuses it to happen. Vicky was about to kill Sher and his family, except Nisha. Both his wives fight for him and save him. After much slapstick, all ends well, and they live happily.

== Cast ==
- Govinda as
  - Sher Singh/Shekhar- Nisha's illegitimate husband, Sweety's legal husband, Tuktuk and Tony's father
  - Vicky Chopra (after plastic surgery ) whose face changed due to plastic surgery to look exactly like Shekhar and pretends to be him.
- Raveena Tandon as Nisha S. Singh - Sher Singh's second wife, Tuktuk's mother, Tony's stepmother, Sweety's rival
- Mahima Chaudhry as Sweety S. Singh- Sher Singh's first wife, Tony's mother, Tuktuk's stepmother, Nisha's rival
- Sagar Thawani as Tony
- Samrat Thawani as Tuktuk
- Satish Shah as Chelaramani
- Shweta Menon as Maggie- Sher Singh's Servant/Dancer
- Mushtaq Khan as Popatlal
- Reema Lagoo as Mrs. Singh- Sher Singh's mother
- Kiran Kumar as Balbir Singh
- Mohnish Behl as Inspector Pange
- Anant Mahadevan as Mr. Rao
- Anang Desai as Plastic Surgeon
- Shammi Kapoor as Swami Trilokanan- A pandit who gives solutions to Sher Singh to tackle his problem, who also tells that soon he will marry two women at the same year.
- Rajendranath Zutshi as the original Vicky who wants to marry Nisha
- Sucheta Khanna as film actress

== Music ==
1. Bahut Chalu Hai Saala - Sonu Nigam, Hema Sardesai, Govinda
2. Bangal Ka Rasgulla - Vinod Rathod, Jaspinder Narula
3. Bedhadak - Sudesh Bhosle, Jaspinder Narula
4. Ek Chumma De Do - Jaspinder Narula, Udit Narayan
5. Gabbroo - Alka Yagnik, Hema Sardesai
6. Hum Tum Hai Tanhai Hai - Sonu Nigam, Asha Bhosle
7. Sayonee - Sonu Kakkar, Sukwinder Singh
8. Zahreela Gussa - Sonu Nigam
