= Shikari (2000 film) =

- Directed by: N. Chandra
- Written by: Kamlesh Pandey (dialogues)
- Screenplay by: Rajeev Kaul; Praful Parikh
- Story by: N. Chandra
- Produced by: Kishan G. Kishnani
- Starring: Govinda; Karishma Kapoor; Tabu
- Cinematography: W. B. Rao
- Edited by: Prashanth Khedekar; Vinod Nayak
- Music by: Aadesh Shrivastava
- Production company: Kavita Pictures
- Release date: 6 October 2000
- Country: India
- Language: Hindi

Shikari (transl. The Hunter) is a 2000 Indian crime thriller film directed by N. Chandra. It stars Govinda, Karishma Kapoor and Tabu, in pivotal roles. It was the second collaboration between the Govinda-Karishma-Tabu trio after Saajan Chale Sasural in 1996. It was the first time that Govinda had chosen an anti-hero role while Karishma Kapoor chose an action-packed role, during which Govinda was briefly typed in comic roles and Karishma for glamorous roles. Govinda also wore prosthetic makeup for the first time in his career. It was released on the eve of Dusshera. Upon release, the film was an below-average grosser at the box office, but Govinda's work was mostly appreciated by the critics.

== Plot ==
Vijayendra is the richest business tycoon in Cape Town, South Africa. His sister Rajeshwari, wife Suman and his mother are his only relatives. Vijayendra 's marital life is in discord, since he has never had any relations with Suman. One day, Vijayendra gets a business rival, Mahendra Pratap Singhania. Mahendra is an Indian spice tycoon wanting to expand his business in South Africa.

Vijayendra is initially wary of Mahendra's expansion plans, but sees the latter's entry as a tool to expand his own business. Unknown to Vijayendra, Mahendra is actually a well disguised man named Om Srivastav. Om has a bigger agenda than becoming a tycoon. Mahendra and Vijayendra strike a deal, upon which Vijayendra is invited to a house in forest for celebration. Once there, Mahendra reveals his true face to Vijayendra, who is revealed to know Om.

Om kills Vijayendra and covers up his death. Later, he shows up at Vijayendra 's funeral, claiming that he and Vijayendra met in India, where they became friends. Rajeshwari suspects him from day one and finds his timing suspicious. Suman too is particularly unhappy on seeing Om. Suman reveals to her mother-in-law that she and Om were in love with each other, but her father got her married to Vijayendra, the son of her father's old friend.

Suman tells her that she had told Vijayendra about the relationship, after which he told her to go with Om. Instead, she stayed with Vijayendra, being overwhelmed by his compassion. However, Vijayendra thought that Suman was a gold-digger, explaining his attitude towards her. Meanwhile, a cat and mouse game starts between Om and Rajeshwari, in which she nearly exposes him. Om is able to save his skin once again, but Rajeshwari gets a feeling that Om is hurt by something.

Rajeshwari thinks that Om may not be a killer and she has inadvertently hurt the wrong man. She goes to apologize, but finds many pictures of her at his apartment. Rajeshwari thinks that Om was hurt because he was secretly in love with her. Rajeshwari asks for an apology and Om plays along. Suman becomes both jealous and uneasy of this new relationship. She and Rajeshwari finally get into a fight, where she almost slaps Rajeshwari.

Rajeshwari leaves her home in a huff and tells everything to Om, who shocks her by slapping her. An angered Om goes on to tell her everything, finally confessing his sin. Before Rajeshwari can do anything, he throws her in a dry well and escapes in his car. Suman tries to find Rajeshwari at Om's place. Om feigns ignorance and the duo start to search for her, with Om deliberately misleading Suman.

Rajeshwari screams for help, until Zafrani comes to that place. He rescues her and she darts back to locate Om. When she finally finds Om with Suman, she is fully convinced that her brother's murder was a pre-meditated by Om and Suman. Seeing his plans failing, Om overpowers the duo and ties them up. He confesses the crime before Suman, making Rajeshwari realize that Suman is in fact innocent.

Then Om reveals his motive. It is revealed that after learning about Om from Suman, Vijayendra had secretly come with his goons, assaulted Om, killed his father and raped his sisters, forcing them to commit suicide. Om readies himself to mow Rajeshwari and Suman down, but Zafrani arrives there with a police team. The women are rescued, but Om drives his car into the valley making them realize that Om was going to commit suicide to avoid police, now that his work was done. The women return home distraught.

== Cast ==
- Govinda as Om Srivastav / Mahendra Pratap Singhania
- Karishma Kapoor as Rajeshwari Rawal
- Tabu as Suman
- Kiran Kumar as Arjun Singh
- Johnny Lever as Jafrani
- Shweta Menon as Sanya Jacobs
- Nirmal Pandey as Vijayendra Singh Rawal
- Sushma Seth as Rajeshwari's mother
- Rana Jung Bahadur as Inspector Rana
- Vishnu Sharma as Rajesh Srivastav
- Beena Banerjee as Beena
- Deep Dhillon as Inspector Baktawar
- Razak Khan as Anand Godbole
- Arun Bali as Vishal Chaudhry
- Ghanshyam Nayak as Mishraji
- Pramod Muthu as Roshan Mahanta
- Anil Nagrath as Roopchand
- Pushpa Verma as Sneha
- Mayuri Kango as Item Dancer

== Soundtrack ==
Shikari

Soundtrack album by Aadesh Shrivastava
- Released: 15 July 2000
- Recorded: 2000
- Genre: Feature film soundtrack
- Length: 49:18
- Label: Saregama Music

Music was released on Saregama Music, most popular song in album "Bahut Khoobsurat Ghazal" sang by Kumar Sanu.

#	Song	Singer
1.	"Bahut Khoobsurat Ghazal"	Kumar Sanu
2.	"Chunri Ude To Aankh Phadke"	Abhijeet, Jaspinder Narula
3.	"Kudi Badi Hai Soni Soni"	Sonu Nigam
4.	"Shikari Ne Shikar Kiya"	Anuradha Paudwal, Udit Narayan
5.	"Chalee Chalee Ri Gori"	Vinod Rathod, Alka Yagnik
6.	"Bheja Hai Ek Gulab"	Kumar Sanu, Asha Bhosle
7.	"Gora Pareshan Hai"	Amit Kumar, Poornima

== Awards and nominations ==
- Nominated – Filmfare Best Villain Award - Govinda
- Nominated – Star Screen Award for Best Actor in a Negative Role - Govinda
