= Kyo Kii... Main Jhuth Nahin Bolta =

2001 film by David Dhawan

- Poster
- Directed by: David Dhawan
- Screenplay by: Yunus Sajawal, Imtiaz Patel
- Story by: David Dhawan
- Produced by: Ekta Kapoor; Shobha Kapoor
- Starring: Govinda; Sushmita Sen; Rambha
- Cinematography: K. P. Prakash Rao
- Edited by: David Dhawan
- Music by: Anand Raj Anand
- Production company: Balaji Motion Pictures
- Release date: 21 September 2001
- Country: India
- Language: Hindi
- Box office: ₹14.34 crore

Kyo Kii... Main Jhuth Nahin Bolta (transl. Because... I do not lie) rarely abbreviated as KMJNB is a 2001 Indian Hindi-language fantasy comedy film directed by David Dhawan, starring Govinda, Sushmita Sen, Rambha, Anupam Kher, Satish Kaushik, Mohnish Bahl, and Ashish Vidyarthi. It is unofficial remake of the American film Liar Liar (1997) starring Jim Carrey. This was later remade into a Telugu film as Mayagadu.

== Plot ==
Raj, a small-town lawyer, travels to Mumbai to make his fortune. He moves in with his friend Mohan, who has lived in the city for a decade without finding success. Tejpal is the city's most successful lawyer, and his elder daughter is married to Adarsh, another lawyer who rose from poverty to wealth almost overnight. Hoping to replicate Adarsh's success, Raj charms and seduces Tejpal's younger daughter, Sonam, and marries her. However, Sonam refuses to live on her father's money and makes Raj return to Mohan's house, where they begin married life.

Forced to rebuild his career, Raj takes on the defence of Kalra's brother, who is accused of murder. After securing his acquittal, Raj gains lucrative opportunities and begins working exclusively for the underworld. He also has an affair with Kalra's secretary, Tara. Seven years later, Raj has become wealthy and successful, surpassing Tejpal.

When Kalra's brother is accused of another murder, Raj acts as prosecutor. He secretly assures Kalra that he will deliberately lose the case, allowing his brother to escape conviction. Sonam overhears him and, disgusted by his dishonesty, leaves Raj, taking their seven-year-old son with her. That night, their son prays that his parents will not divorce and that Raj will stop lying. His wish is miraculously granted, leaving Raj unable to lie despite his attempts.

Raj's newfound honesty rapidly destroys his personal and professional life. Sonam files for divorce, Tara leaves him, and Kalra becomes angry when Raj questions the credibility of their false witnesses. Raj flees, but discovers evidence proving that Kalra and his brother committed the murder. By nightfall, his son reverses his wish, restoring Raj's ability to lie, but Raj has become determined to uphold the truth.

In court, Raj presents the evidence and proves Kalra and his brother's guilt. They are convicted, and Raj reconciles with Sonam, who is pleased that he has returned to his honest ways.

== Cast ==
- Govinda as Raj Malhotra
- Sushmita Sen as Sonam "Sona" Singh, Tejpal's daughter and Raj's wife
- Rambha as Tara Ahuja, Kalra's assistant with whom Raj has an extramarital affair
- Satish Kaushik as Mohan Sharma, Raj's friend and also a lawyer, who invites Raj to live with him in his house
- Anupam Kher as Tejpal Singh, a famous and respected lawyer in the city
- Sharad Kapoor as Adarsh, Sonam’s brother-in-law, married to her elder sister
- Ashish Vidyarthi as Kalra, an underworld don who hires Raj to fight his brother's case
- Shahbaz Khan as Vinod, brother to the underworld don Kalra
- Kiran Kumar as Khurana, a businessman who helps Raj secure his first case
- Razzak Khan as Kala Bhai, Kalra's henchman
- Anant Mahadevan as Anand Mhatre, a tenant who is murdered by Vinod for refusing to vacate his landlord's house
- Jaya Bhattacharya as Kavita Mhatre, wife of Anand Mhatre, who is murdered by Vinod
- Mohnish Behl as Rajat Shukla, a journalist who films Anand Mhatre being murdered by Vinod
- Rammohan Sharma as Mr. Rahul Pange
- Jibraan Khan as Chintu Malhotra, Raj and Sonam's son
- Ghanshyam Rohera as Mishra Khanna
- Shashi Kiran as Doctor Sadanand
- Guddi Maruti as Tisha Singh
- Ajit Vachani as Mr. Amit Vachhani
- Anil Nagrath as Judge Roopchand
- Amit Behl as Doctor Ajay Sardesai
- Mahavir Shah as Public Prosecutor Arvind Kumar Choudhry

== Soundtrack ==
Kyo Kii... Main Jhuth Nahin Bolta

Soundtrack album by Anand Raj Anand
- Released: 2001
- Genre: Feature film soundtrack
- Label: T-Series

The music has been composed by Anand Raj Anand.

Title	Singer(s)	Lyricist(s)
"Ek Ladki Chahiye"	Sonu Nigam, Jaspinder Narula	Dev Kohli
"Ek Ladki Deewani Si"	Pratik Joseph	Pratik Joseph
"Paa Liya Hain Pyar Tera"	Udit Narayan, Alka Yagnik	Dev Kohli
"Hai Udd Gayi"	Sonu Nigam, Anuradha Sriram	Dev Kohli
"Suno Miya Suno"	Udit Narayan, Sadhana Sargam, Poornima	Dev Kohli
"Kaun Kehta Hai"	Abhijeet	Dev Kohli

== Awards and nominations ==
- Nominated – Filmfare Award for Best Performance in a Comic Role - Govinda
