= Vinod Rathod =

Indian singer (born 1962)

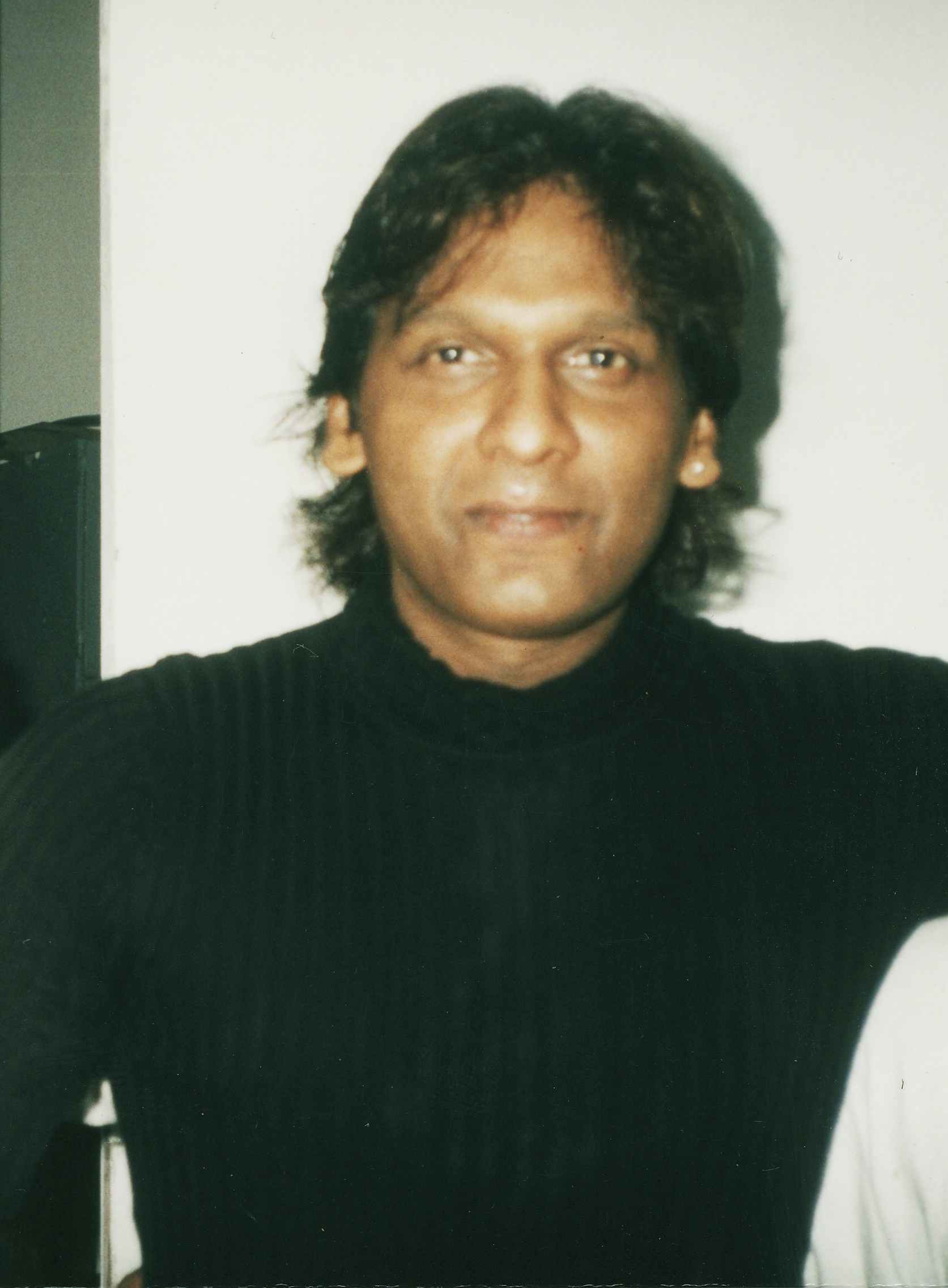

Background information
- Born: 12 September 1962 (age 64); Bombay (present–day Mumbai), Maharashtra, India
- Genre: Playback singing
- Occupations: Singer, performer
- Years active: 1987–2013
- Website: vinodrathod.co.in
Vinod Rathod
- Father: Pandit Chaturbhuj Rathod

Vinod Rathod (born 12 September 1962) is an Indian playback singer and dubbing voice actor who primarily sings in Hindi language films. Rathod is the son of late classical musician, Pandit Chaturbhuj Rathod. He is the younger brother of late Shravan Rathod who too was a singer and a composer, being a part of the Nadeem-Shravan duo, making Vinod the second son of Chaturbhuj Rathod. Vinod himself has a younger brother Roopkumar Rathod, who is also a renowned singer, having sung many Hindi, Tamil, Telugu language songs too.

He was a popular playback singer in the 1990s, and is often remembered as providing the singing voice of many actors including Sanjay Dutt, Shah Rukh Khan, Govinda and Rishi Kapoor.

== Music career ==
His career started when Usha Khanna after listening to his voice in a cassette called him in April 1986, to sing a qawwali, "Mere Dil Main Hai Andhera, Koi Shamma To Jala De" in Do Yaar. Mohammed Aziz was his co-singer. Vinod recorded no less than 40 songs for the composer, and also sang for composers like Ajay Swami and Surinder Kohli in his struggle phase. His TV serial title song, "Yeh Jeevan Hai Akash Ganga" for the serial Akash Ganga proved very successful amongst viewers.

He entered the big films league when composers Shiv-Hari called him to record "Baadal Pe Chalke Aa" with Lata Mangeshkar and Suresh Wadekar which proved popular and "Zindagi Har Janam Pyar Ki Dastan" with Lata Mangeshkar in Yash Chopra's Vijay in 1988 proved to be a greater success. Vinod was the voice of Rishi Kapoor in this multi-starer film. He then sang for Rishi-Yash-Shiv-Hari again in Chandni in 1989. This song, "Parbat Se Kaali Ghata Takrai" with Asha Bhosle also proved a hit along with "Sheharon Mein Ek Shehar Suna" with Lata Mangeshkar.

However, he got his real break in 1992 when Laxmikant–Pyarelal offered him "Romeo Naam Mera" for Roop Ki Rani Choron Ka Raja. It has proven to be one of the biggest hit of 1992. Laxmikant-Pyarelal rapidly called him for more films, which instilled confidence for Vinod among the other composers like Anu Malik, Bappi Lahiri and Anand–Milind. As luck would have it, Nadeem–Shravan (Shravan is Vinod's elder brother) were at the crest of popularity, and though Nadeem favoured Kumar Sanu he gave Vinod Rathod the onus of being the voice of Shah Rukh Khan in Deewana. "Aisi Deewangi" with Alka Yagnik proved a rage and "Koi Na Koi Chahiye Pyar Karne Wala" too proved popular. This film was also released in 1992.

By 1993, Vinod Rathod was a very busy man. Laxmikant-Pyarelal gave him excellent songs in several films like Bedardi, Dilbar and many other films, and decided that he would be the major voice of Rishi Kapoor in the R K film Prem Granth. Their hits with him included "Jab Se Main Jara Sa Badnam Ho Gaya' – Gumrah and "Nayak Nahin Khalnayak Hoon Main" – Khal-Nayak. Anu Malik swept aside Nadeem-Shravan by late 1993–94 and Vinod Rathod was very much there in hits like "Ae Mere Humsafar", "Kitabein Bahut Si", "Samajhkar Chand Jisko" and "Chupana Bhi Nahin Aata' – Baazigar. Followed Ladla, Elaan, Agnisakshi, Muhabbat Ki Arzoo, Chahoonga Main Tujhe, Gambler, Parampara, The Gentleman, Zamana Deewana, Shreemaan Aashique, Maidan-E-Jung, Policewala Gunda, Hum Sab Chor Hain, Chaahat, Vastav and the hits "Duniya Ye Duniya Very Good Very Good" – Trimurti and "Dil Dene Ki Rut Aayi" – Prem Granth. Anand–Milind made him the voice of Govinda in films like Raja Babu, Rajaji, Hero No. 1, Dulhe Raja, Ankhiyon Se Goli Maare and Banarsi Babu. He also sang the popular Main to hoon paagal munda for Shahrukh Khan in 1996 in the film Army.

Vinod had a triumph of sorts in the Zee Telefilm, Mr. Shrimati, in which he sang "Aashiq Ki Hai Baraat". His other hits include his songs from Deewana Mastana, Army, Hero No. 1 and Dulhe Raja, Tere Mere Sapne, and his latest chartbuster, "Dholi Taro Dhol Baje" – Hum Dil De Chuke Sanam, "Chalak Chalak" – Devdas, "M Bole To" – Munna Bhai MBBS which has given his career a new boost after 1999. His songs from Chal Mere Bhai have proved popular too.

“Main Hoon Number Ek Gawaiya" from Saajan Chale Sasural proved his classical excellence which he has incorporated from his father.

Not only a huge list of production houses Vinod has sung more than 3500 songs in various languages such as Hindi, Nepali, English, Gujarati, Marathi, Sindhi, Punjabi, Bengali, Oriya, Tamil, Kannada, Telugu, Rajasthani, Bhojpuri and Persian.

Vinod Rathod has received nominations for Filmfare Award for Best Male Playback Singer in 1993: Aisi Deewangi (Deewana) and 1994: Nayak Nahin Kahlnayak Hoon Main (Khalnayak)

He is the uncle of music composers Sanjeev–Darshan, brother of music composer/singer Roop Kumar Rathod and music director Shravan Rathod.

== Discography ==
He entered the big films league in 1988 and he had received two times nomination for Filmfare Award for Best Male Playback Singer for his best performance in "Aisi Deewangi" from Deewana and "Nayak Nahin Kahlnayak Hoon Main" from Khalnayak. He has sung for all the leading composers and his most popular co-singers were Sadhana Sargam, Anuradha Paudwal, Asha Bhosle, Lata Mangeshkar, Alka Yagnik, Poornima and Kavita Krishnamurthy.

Year	Film	Song title	Music director	Co-singer(s)	Language	
1986	Bedaag	"Mere Dil Main Hai Andhera"	Usha Khanna	Mohammed Aziz	Hindi	
1988	Vijay	"Zindagi Har Janam"	Shiv–Hari	Suresh Wadkar, Lata Mangeshkar	Hindi	
1989	Chandni	"Mehbooba" "Parbat Se Kaali"	Shiv–Hari	Lata Mangeshkar; Asha Bhosle	Hindi	
1990	Pyar Pyar	"Operator Operator"	Nadeem–Shravan	Sapna Mukherjee	Hindi	
1990	Solah Satra	"Ajab Zindagi Ka"	Nadeem–Shravan		Hindi	
1991	House No. 13	"Dil The Tera" "Kar Liya Hai"	Enoch Daniels	Kavita Krishnamurthy	Hindi	
1992	Deewana	"Aisi Deewangi" "Koi Na Koi Chahiye"	Nadeem–Shravan	Alka Yagnik	Hindi	
1992	Drohi	"Dhadakti Mere Dil"	M. M. Keeravani	K. S. Chithra	Hindi	
1992	Apradhi	"Yeh Pyar Bada Bedardi Hai"	Laxmikant–Pyarelal	Alka Yagnik	Hindi	
1993	Darr	"Ang Se Ang Lagana" "Ishq Da Rog Bura"	Shiv–Hari	Alka Yagnik, Sudesh Bhosle; Lata Mangeshkar	Hindi	
1993	Baazigar	"Kitabein Bahut Si" "Chhupana Bhi Nahi Aata" "Samajh Kar Chand Jis Ko" "Ae Mere Humsafar"	Anu Malik	Asha Bhosle Alka Yagnik; Alka Yagnik	Hindi	
1993	Shabnam	"Tera Naam Likhkar Haathon Pe Hum"	Anu Malik	Anuradha Paudwal	Hindi	
1993	Tahqiqaat	"Doob Gaye Mere Nain" "Na Tum Itni Haseen Hoti" "Tu Kisi Aur Se Milne (Male)"	Anu Malik	Asha Bhosle; Sadhana Sargam	Hindi	
1993	Roop Ki Rani Choron Ka Raja	"Romeo Naam Mera" "Jaanewale Zara Ruk Ja"	Laxmikant–Pyarelal	Kavita Krishnamurthy	Hindi	
1993	Gumrah	"Ram Kasam Mera Bada Naam Ho Gaya"	Laxmikant–Pyarelal		Hindi	
1993	Khalnayak	"Nayak Nahi Khalnayak Hoon Main" "Choli Ke Peeche Kya Hai (Male)"	Laxmikant–Pyarelal	Kavita Krishnamurthy	Hindi	
1993	Bedardi	"Ek Din To Honi Thi" "Mai Tumse Pyar Karti Hu" "Bolo Main Pyar Karti Hu"	Laxmikant–Pyarelal	Alka Yagnik	Hindi	
1993	Do Dilon Ka Sangam	"Ab Tanhai Mujhe" "Dekha Tha Usne Pyar Se" "Chandni Khushboo Shabnam"	Milind Sagar	Anuradha Paudwal; Anuradha Paudwal; Anuradha Paudwal	Hindi	
1993	Shreemaan Aashique	"Ladki Ladki"	Nadeem–Shravan	Sudesh Bhonsle	Hindi	
1993	Krishan Avtaar	"Mera Mehboob Mujhse" "Humse Pyar Karo" "Gudiya Pyari Pyari Gudiya"	Nadeem–Shravan	Alka Yagnik	Hindi	
1993	Tadipaar	"Agar Mere Paas Paisa" "O Saiyan Saiyan"	Nadeem–Shravan	Alka Yagnik	Hindi	
1993	Sukher Swarga	"Na Bolo Na"	Ajoy Das	Sapna Mukherjee	Bengali	
1994	Anokha Andaaz	"Aap Se Pehle Na Aap Ke Baad"	Nadeem–Shravan	Alka Yagnik	Hindi	
1994	Andaz	"Ye Maal Gaadi" "Khada Hai" "Nacho Gaao Filmein Dikhao"	Bappi Lahiri	Kavita Krishnamurthy; Sadhana Sargam; Alka Yagnik	Hindi	
1994	Imtihaan	"Ek Yaad Ke Sahare"	Anu Malik		Hindi	
1994	Laadla	"Main Raju Deewana"	Anand–Milind		Hindi	
1994	Zaalim	"Chaar Din Ka Safar" "Pehle Hi Qayamat Kya Kam Thi"	Anu Malik	Kavita Krishnamurthy, Suresh Wadkar; Alka Yagnik	Hindi	
1994	Kranti Kshetra	"Tumhara Naam Kya Hai" "Deewane Hai Hum Tere" "Malan Thara Baag Mein"	Nadeem–Shravan	Sadhana Sargam; Sapna Mukherjee; Babul Supriyo, Sapna Awasthi, Sapna Mukherjee, Suryakant	Hindi	
1994	Elaan	"Pehle Mere Aankhon Mein"	Shyam-Surender	Sadhana Sargam	Hindi	
1994	The Gentleman	"Hum Apne Gham Ko" "Aashiqui Mein Had Se"	Anu Malik; A. R. Rahman	Sadhana Sargam; Sadhana Sargam	Hindi	
1994	Main Tera Aashiq	"Dhatura"	Aadesh Shrivastava	Anuradha Paudwal	Hindi	
1995	Trimurti	"Very Good Very Bad" "Mujhe Pyar Karo" "Mata Mata"	Laxmikant–Pyarelal	Udit Narayan; Manhar Udhas, Alka Yagnik; Kavita Krishnamurthy	Hindi	
1995	Zamaana Deewana	"Zamaana Deewana Ho Gaya" "Soch Liya Maine Aye Mere Dilba" "Rok Sake To Rok"	Nadeem–Shravan	Sapna Mukherjee; Alka Yagnik	Hindi	
1995	Ram Shastra	"Tujhe Maanga Tha" "Tera Chehra Na Dekhun Agar"	Anu Malik	Alka Yagnik; Alka Yagnik	Hindi	
1995	Policewala Gunda	"Duniya Ke Mele"	Bappi Lahiri		Hindi	
1995	Gambler	"Chupke Chupke Ghoor Na Mujhko" "Deewangi Ko Tu Meri Pehchaan Jaayegi" "Gambler Gambler" "Sajde Na Kiye Maine"	Anu Malik	Udit Narayan, Alka Yagnik; Alka Yagnik; Sadhana Sargam; Sadhana Sargam	Hindi	
1995	Maidan-E-Jung	"Lo Phagun Ritu Aa Gayee"	Bappi Lahiri	Udit Narayan, Sadhana Sargam	Hindi	
1995	Hum Sab Chor Hain	"Meri Biwi Lakhon"	Bappi Lahiri	Alka Yagnik	Hindi	
1996	Saajan Chale Sasural	"Main hoon No. 1 Gawaiya"	Nadeem–Shravan	Kunal Ganjawala, Mishra, Satyanarayan	Hindi	
1996	Mr. Bechara	"Dekho Dekho Dekho"	Anand–Milind	Sapna Mukherjee	Hindi	
1996	Rakshak	"Sundara Sundara"	Anand–Milind	Sapna Mukherjee	Hindi	
1996	Vijeta	"Khwabo Mein Aanewali"	Anand–Milind	Alka Yagnik	Hindi	
1996	Tere Mere Sapne	"Tere Mere Sapne"	Viju Shah	Udit Narayan, Hema Sardesai	Hindi	
1996	Army	"Main To Hoon Pagal Munda" "De Taali" "Ho Gayee Tiyar Hamari Army"	Anand–Milind	Alka Yagnik; Abhijeet, Jolly Mukherjee, Alka Yagnik; Abhijeet, Jolly Mukherjee, Alka Yagnik	Hindi	
1996	Jeet	"Yaara O Yaara" "Yaara O Yaara (Sad)"	Nadeem–Shravan	Alka Yagnik	Hindi	
1996	Prem Granth	"Jungle Mein Sher" "Dil Dene Ki Ruth" "Is Duniya Men Prem Granth" "Teri Kasam Main Hoon"	Laxmikant–Pyarelal	Alka Yagnik	Hindi	
1996	Chaahat	"Chaahat Na Hoti" "Tumne Dikhaye Aise Sapne"	Anu Malik	Alka Yagnik	Hindi	
1997	Hero No. 1	"Maine Paidal Se Ja Raha Tha" "Tum Hum Pe Marte Ho"	Anand–Milind	Poornima; Sadhana Sargam	Hindi	
1997	Udaan	"Chahun Tujhe"	Anand–Milind	Sadhana Sargam	Hindi	
1997	Deewana Mastana	"Yeh Gaya Woh Gaya" "Tere Bina Dil Lagta Nahin" "Head Ya Tail"	Laxmikant–Pyarelal	Alka Yagnik; Udit Narayan, Alka Yagnik; Udit Narayan, Kavita Krishnamurthy	Hindi	
1997	Mohabbat	"Aina Bataa Kaise" "Pyar Kiya Hai (Duet)" "Pyar Kiya Hai (Sad)"	Nadeem–Shravan	Sonu Nigam; Kavita Krishnamurthy	Hindi	
1997	Virasat	"Sun Mausi Sun Mausi"	Anu Malik		Hindi	
1998	Dulhe Raja	"Dulhan To Jayegi (Dulhe Raja)" "Kahan Raja Bhoj" "Kya Lagti Hai Hai Rabba"	Anand–Milind	Anuradha Paudwal; Sonu Nigam	Hindi	
1998	Kudrat	"Ishq Bhala Kya Hai"	Rajesh Roshan	Alka Yagnik	Hindi	
1998	China Gate	"Chamma Chamma"	Anu Malik	Alka Yagnik, Shankar Mahadevan	Hindi	
1998	Pyaar To Hona Hi Tha	"Jo Hona Hai"	Jatin–Lalit	Asha Bhosle, Mohammed Aziz, Sudesh Bhosle, Bali Brahmbhatt, Anand Bakshi	Hindi	
1999	Hum Dil De Chuke Sanam	"Doli Taro Dhol Baje"	Ismail Darbar	Kavita Krishnamurthy, Karsan Sagathia	Hindi	
1999	Vaastav: The Reality	"Har Taraf Hai Yeh Shor"	Jatin–Lalit	Atul Kale	Hindi	
2000	Chal Mere Bhai	"Aaj Kal Ki Ladkiyan" "Mere Baap Ki Beti"	Anand–Milind	Sonu Nigam, Poornima, Vaijanti; Abhijeet	Hindi	
2000	Hamara Dil Aapke Paas Hai	"Kya Maine Aaj Suna"	Sanjeev–Darshan	Kavita Krishnamurthy	Hindi	
2000	Mission Kashmir	"Maaf Karo"	Ehsaan Noorani	Anuradha Paudwal	Hindi	
2000	Khauff	"Hye Hye Ye Hawa"	Anu Malik	Anuradha Paudwal	Hindi	
2000	Bichhoo	"Pyar Tu Dil Tu"	Anand Raj Anand	Alka Yagnik	Hindi	
2001	Style	"Style Mein Rehne Ka"	Sanjeev–Darshan	Sonu Nigam	Hindi	
2002	Devdas	"Chalak Chalak"	Ismail Darbar	Udit Narayan, Shreya Ghoshal	Hindi	
2002	Desh Devi	"Dabe Paon Se Woh"	Ismail Darbar	Parthiv Gohil, Sneha Pant	Hindi	
2002	Akhiyon Se Goli Maare	"Dehradun Ka Chuna Lagaya" "Ladka Mud Mud Ke Maare" "Thumka Lagake Naachlo"	Daboo Malik; Anand–Milind; Dilip Sen-Sameer Sen	Sunidhi Chauhan; Alka Yagnik; Sonu Nigam, Sanjeevani	Hindi	
2002	Annarth	"Dil Hai Deewana"	Anand Raj Anand	Pamela Jain	Hindi	
2002	Chor Machaaye Shor	"Kaan Ke Neeche" "Tum Tata Ho Ya Birla"	Anu Malik	Anuradha Sriram; Anuradha Sriram	Hindi	
2002	Road	"Raste Raste"	Sandesh Shandilya	Sunidhi Chauhan	Hindi	
2002	Hum Tumhare Hain Sanam	"Dil Tod Aaya"	Sajid–Wajid	Sonu Nigam	Hindi	
2002	Pyaar Diwana Hota Hai	"Teri Aankhen Bolti"	Uttam Singh	Alka Yagnik	Hindi	
2002	Hum Kisise Kum Nahin	"Kya Kehna" "Main Sohni Tu Mahiwal"	Anu Malik	Udit Narayan; Anuradha Paudwal, Sonu Nigam	Hindi	
2002	Maseeha	"Aaya Maza Na Yaar"	Anand Raj Anand		Hindi	
2003	Munna Bhai M.B.B.S.	"Chan Chan" "M Bole To" "Apun Jaise Tapori"	Anu Malik	Shreya Ghoshal; Sanjay Dutt, Prachi, Priya Mayekar	Hindi	
2003	Border Hindustan Ka	"Yaad Aati Hai"	Dilip-Hari Kishen	Kumar Sanu, Udit Narayan	Hindi	
2003	Parwana	"Duniya Mein Aaye Ho" "Deva Ho Deva"	Sanjeev–Darshan	Farid Sabri	Hindi	
2003	Pran Jaye Par Shaan Na Jaye	"Hum Tere Sanam"	Daboo Malik		Hindi	
2003	Guru	"Bhadra Falgun Chaitra Ashar Sraban"	Babul Bose		Bengali	
2004	Uuf Kya Jaadoo Mohabbat Hai	"Jagmug"	Sandesh Shandilya	K. S. Chithra	Hindi	
2004	Ishq Hai Tumse	"Ishq Hai Zindagi"	Himesh Reshammiya	Alka Yagnik, Udit Narayan	Hindi	
2004	Annaye Atyachar	"Ek Nodir Ujan"	Saikat Ali Imon	Sadhna Sargam	Bengali	
2004	Shikaar	"O Jiya Kya Kiya"	Anand Raj Anand	Udit Narayan, Anand Raj Anand, Sunidhi Chauhan	Hindi	
2004	Police Force	"Maina Kunwari" "Bholi Bhali Soorat Se" "Maina Kunwari – 2"	Anand–Milind	Poornima	Hindi	
2004	Thali Kattuva Shubhavele	"Yoga Yoga Koodi"	Ennar K. Viswanath	Archana	Kannada	
2005	Pandit... Ek Yodha		S. A. Rajkumar		Hindi	
2005	Vissfoth		Rituraj		Hindi	
2006	Meri Majboori...	"Meri Majboori"	Bappi Lahiri		Hindi	
2006	Lage Raho Munna Bhai	"Lage Raho Munna Bhai" "Samjho Ho Hi Gaya"	Shantanu Moitra	Sanjay Dutt, Arshad Warsi	Hindi	
2006	Zinda	"Yeh Hai Meri Kahani"		Sanjay Dutt	Hindi	
2006	Sandwich	"Yeh Hai Meri Kahani"		Sanjay Dutt	Hindi	
2007	Aag	"Ruk Ja" "Cha Raha" "Jee Le" "Dum"	Amar Mohile; Nitin Raikwar; Prasanna Shekhar; Amar Mohile	Sunidhi Chauhan; Shweta Pandit; Farhaad Bhiwandiwala	Hindi	
2007	Traffic Signal	"Signal Pe"	Shamir Tandon	Baba Sehgal, Navin Prabhakar, Neeraja Pandit, Raj Pandit	Hindi	
2007	Nehlle Pe Dehlla	"Bottle Mein Main" "Imaan Dol Jaayenge"	Daboo Malik; Anand Raaj Anand	Abhijeet Bhattacharya, Sunidhi Chauhan; Sunidhi Chauhan	Hindi	
2008	Chandramukhi (Dubbed Version)	"Tota Para Para"	Vidyasagar	Sadhana Sargam, Shivani Das, Manoj Mishra	Hindi	
2008	Chandramukhi (Dubbed Version)	"Oh Oh Sun meri baat "	Vidyasagar	Sadhana Sargam, Shivani Das, Manoj Mishra	Hindi	
2008	Chandramukhi (Dubbed Version)	" Aaja are tu aaja(Rara)"	Vidyasagar	Sadhana Sargam	Hindi	
2008	Homam	"Homam"	Nithin Raikwar		Telugu	
2009	Rajdrohi	"Pagla Jhoro Hawa"	Babul Bose	Asha Bhonsle	Bengali	
2010	Aatangko	"Hele Dule Chole Dekho"	Babul Bose		Bengali	
2012	Daal Mein Kuch Kaala Hai	"Vada Pav"	Aabfm		Hindi	
2013	Zamaanat	"Kya Mohabbat Hai"	Viju Shah	Alka Yagnik, Javed Ali	Hindi	
2014	Bachchan	"Latai"	Jeet Gannguli	Akriti Kakkar	Bengali	
2015	Love in Rajasthan	"Asbe Jokhon Modhur"			Bengali	
2016	God Father (2016 film)	Omm Namah Sibaya	Abhijit Majumdar	Nirmal Nayak		Odia
2016	God Father (2016 film)	Godfather Title"	Abhijit Majumdar	Nirmal Nayak	Navya Jaiti	Odia
2018	Aaya Hai Dulha Dulhan Le Jayega (	"Aaya Hai Dulha Dulhan Le Jayega"	Pradeep	Sanjeevani Bhelande		

== Dubbing career ==
While he was known for his chartbuster songs, he also provided his voice to South Indian actors in a total of nine films including Akkineni Nagarjuna Rao, Ghattamaneni Mahesh Babu, U. V. S. Prabhas Raju, Jr. N.T.R., Vishal Krishna Reddy, Joseph Vijay Chandrasekhar and others.

== Dubbing roles ==
=== Live action films ===
Film title	Actor	Character	Dub Language	Original Language	Original year release	Dub year release	Notes
Snehamante Idera	Akkineni Nagarjuna Rao	Aravind	Hindi	Telugu	2001	2007	The Hindi dub was titled: Naya Jigar.
Mass: Dammunte Kasko...	Akkineni Nagarjuna Rao	Mass/Ganesh	Hindi	Telugu	2004	2007	The Hindi dub was titled: Meri Jung – One Man Army.
Nenunnanu	Akkineni Nagarjuna Rao	Venu Madhav aka 'Venu'	Hindi	Telugu	2004	2006	The Hindi dub was titled: Vishwa – The He Man.
Subbu	Jr. N.T.R.	Bala Subramanyam aka 'Subbu'	Hindi	Telugu	2001	Unknown	The Hindi dub was titled: Tiger – One Man Army.
Super	Akkineni Nagarjuna Rao	Akhil	Hindi	Telugu	2005	2006	The Hindi dub was titled: Robbery.
Vettaiyaadu Vilaiyaadu	Kamal Haasan	Raghavan	Hindi	Tamil	2006	2012	The Hindi dub was titled: The Smart Hunt.
Azhagiya Tamil Magan	Joseph Vijay Chandrasekhar	Gurumoorthy/Prasad (dual role)	Hindi	Tamil	2007	2008	The Hindi dub was titled: International Sabse Bada Khiladi.
Sachein	Joseph Vijay Chandrasekhar	Sachein	Hindi	Tamil	2005	2009	The Hindi dub was titled: Ghamandee.
Maisamma I.P.S.	Unknown actor	Sub-Insp. Rama Swami (Ravi Sharma in Hindi version)	Hindi	Telugu	2007	2008	The Hindi dub was titled: Yeh Hai Mera Faisla.
Bujjigadu	U. V. S. Prabhas Raju	Bujji (Monty in Hindi version)	Hindi	Telugu	2008	2009	The Hindi dub was titled: Deewar: Man of Power.
Thoranai	Vishal Krishna Reddy	C. Murugan (Vishal in Hindi version)	Hindi	Tamil	2009	2009	The Hindi dub was titled: Vishal Ki Qurbani.
Gemini	Kennedy John Victor "Vikram"	Gemini	Hindi	Tamil	2002	2008	The Hindi dub was titled: Angaar: The Deadly One.
Khaleja	Ghattamaneni Mahesh Babu	Alluri Seetharama Raju, a cab driver (Hardoi Chhatrapati Raju in Hindi version)	Hindi	Telugu	2010	2011	The Hindi dub was titled: Jigar Kaleja.
