= Anand–Milind =

Indian music directors duo

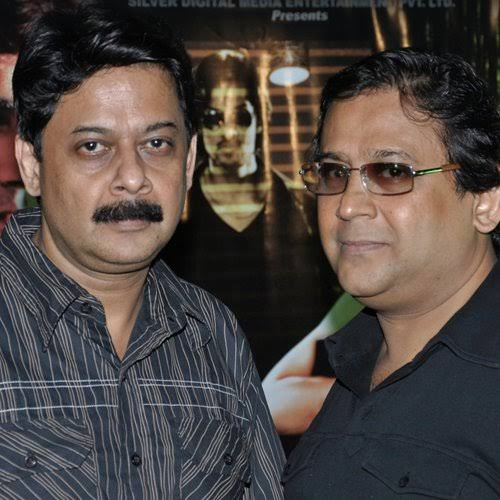
- Born: Mumbai, Maharashtra, India
- Occupation: Music Composer
- Years active: 1983–present
- Father: Chitragupt

Anand–Milind is an Indian music composer duo consisting of brothers Anand Srivastava and Milind Srivastava. Born to composer Chitragupt, they have composed music for over 200 Bollywood films. The brothers debuted in 1984 with Ab Ayega Mazaa and had their major breakthrough with the blockbuster romantic musical Qayamat Se Qayamat Tak (1988), for which they won the Filmfare Award for Best Music Director.

== Career ==
Anand and Milind wrote the score for Ab Ayega Mazaa (1984), Jalwa (1987), Qayamat Se Qayamat Tak (1988) and then for Baaghi: A Rebel For Love (1990).

== Accolades ==
Year	Award	Film	Result	Ref.
1989	34th Filmfare Award for Best Music Director	Qayamat Se Qayamat Tak	Won	

- 2020: Lata Mangeshkar Award by the Government of Madhya Pradesh
