= Karisma Kapoor filmography =

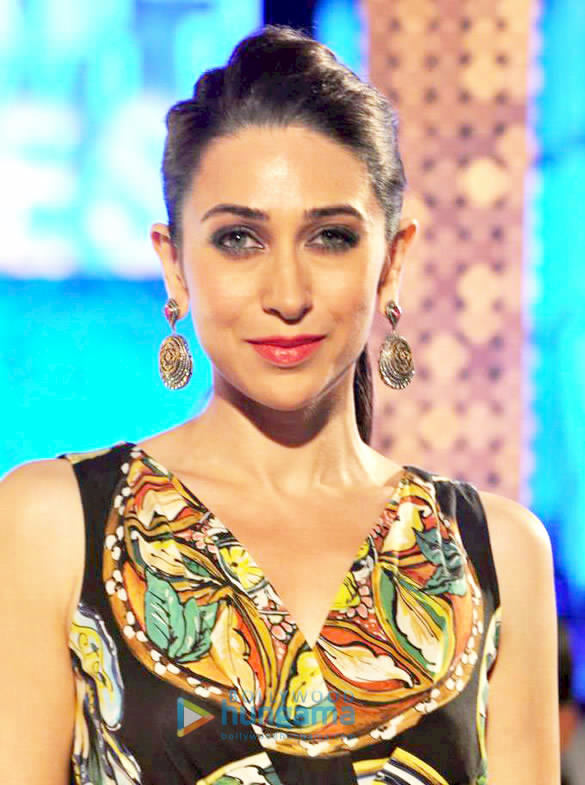
Kapoor in 2013

Karisma Kapoor is an Indian actress widely known for her work in Hindi films. She made her acting debut in 1991 at the age of seventeen in the romance Prem Qaidi, which was a box office hit. She then appeared in successful ventures, drama Sapne Sajan Ke (1992), and action drama Jigar (1992). She had her first commercial success in a leading role in romantic action drama Anari (1993), which was a moderate success and was one of the highest-grossing Hindi films of 1993. Between 1993–1996 she featured in several highly successful films, including the comedy drama Raja Babu (1994), action drama Suhaag (1994), action comedy Andaz (1994), the comedies Coolie No. 1 (1995), Saajan Chale Sasural (1996), and Hero No. 1 (1997), and the action thriller Jeet (1996). The success of these films marked a turning point in her career, and established Kapoor as one of the leading actresses in Hindi cinema.

Kapoor's career prospects improved in 1996 when Dharmesh Darshan cast her in his romantic drama Raja Hindustani. With worldwide earnings of ₹763.4 million (US$7.9 million), it emerged as the highest-grossing film of the year and the fourth highest-grossing film in India of the 1990s. The film earned her praise from critics, and Kapoor won her first Filmfare Award for Best Actress. The following year, she received widespread recognition as well as the National Film Award and Filmfare Award for Best Supporting Actress for portraying a headstrong dancer in Dil To Pagal Hai, a musical romantic drama produced by Yash Raj Films. Subsequently, she played leading roles in several blockbuster films, including the comedies Biwi No.1 (1999), the ensemble family drama Hum Saath-Saath Hain (1999), and the romantic comedy Dulhan Hum Le Jayenge (2000). Her acclaimed performance of a disillusioned sister of Hrithik Roshan's character in the crime drama Fiza (2000) which earned her a second Best Actress award at Filmfare. The following year, she portrayed actress Zubeida Begum in the biographical drama Zubeidaa (2001), won her a Filmfare Award for Best Actress (Critics). In 2002, she portrayed a troubled daughter-in-law in the revenge-seeking war drama Shakti: The Power.

In 2003, Kapoor married businessman Sanjay Kapur and took a sabbatical from the films. However, she appeared in Sahara One's television series Karishma – The Miracles of Destiny (2003–2004) and judged various reality shows, including the celebrity dance show Nach Baliye (2008–2009), during this time. In 2011, she provided her voice for the role of Chhaya in the action thriller Bodyguard, which broke many records upon its release. It became the highest opening day grosser, collecting ₹1.03 billion (US$11 million) in its first week, thus becoming the highest opening week grossing. She made her acting comeback to films with the period drama Dangerous Ishhq (2012) in which she played four different characters, belonging to four different past lives. It proved to be a commercial failure yet earned Kapoor appreciation for her performance. After the release of Dangerous Ishhq, she again took a sabbatical from films. In 2020, she played a mother in the streaming television series Mentalhood.

== Films ==
Key
†	Denotes films that have not yet been released

Karisma Kapoor's film credits
Year	Film	Role(s)	Notes	Ref.
1991	Prem Qaidi	Neelima		
1992	Police Officer	Bijali		
1992	Jaagruti	Shalu		
1992	Nishchaiy	Payal		
1992	Sapne Sajan Ke	Jyoti		
1992	Deedar	Sapna Saxena		
1992	Jigar	Suman		
1993	Anari	Rajnandini		
1993	Muqabla	Karishma		
1993	Sangraam	Madhu		
1993	Shaktiman	Priya		
1993	Dhanwaan	Anjali Chopra		
1994	Prem Shakti	Gouri and Karisma (Note: Kapoor played two characters in this film.)		
1994	Raja Babu	Madhoo		
1994	Dulaara	Priya		
1994	Khuddar	Pooja		
1994	Andaz	Jaya		
1994	Andaz Apna Apna	Karishma (Raveena) (Note: Kapoor played a character with two different names in this film.)		
1994	Yeh Dillagi	Anjali	Cameo appearance	
1994	Aatish	Pooja		
1994	Suhaag	Pooja		
1994	Gopi Kishan	Barkha		
1995	Jawab	Suman		
1995	Maidan-E-Jung	Tulsi		
1995	Coolie No.1	Malti		
1996	Papi Gudia	Karisma		
1996	Megha	Megha		
1996	Saajan Chale Sasural	Pooja		
1996	Krishna	Rashmi		
1996	Jeet	Kajal Sharma		
1996	Bal Bramhachari	Asha		
1996	Sapoot	Pooja		
1996	Raja Hindustani	Aarti Sehgal		
1996	Rakshak	Suman Sinha		
1996	Ajay	Manorama		
1997	Judwaa	Mala Sharma		
1997	Hero No. 1	Meena Nath Malhotra		
1997	Lahu Ke Do Rang	Heena		
1997	Mrityudaata	Reenu		
1997	Dil To Pagal Hai	Nisha		
1999	Silsila Hai Pyar Ka	Vanshikha Mathur		
1999	Biwi No.1	Pooja Makhija		
1999	Haseena Maan Jaayegi	Ritu Verma		
1999	Hum Saath-Saath Hain	Sapna Bajpai		
1999	Jaanwar	Sapna		
2000	Dulhan Hum Le Jayenge	Sapna		
2000	Chal Mere Bhai	Sapna		
2000	Hum To Mohabbat Karega	Geeta Kapoor		
2000	Fiza	Fiza Ikramullah		
2000	Shikari	Rajeshwari Rawal		
2001	Zubeidaa	Zubeidaa		
2001	Aashiq	Pooja		
2001	Ek Rishtaa	Nisha Thapar		
2002	Haan Maine Bhi Pyaar Kiya	Pooja Kashyap		
2002	Shakti: The Power	Nandini		
2002	Rishtey	Komal		
2003	Baaz	Neha Chopra		
2006	Mere Jeevan Saathi	Natasha Arora		
2007	Om Shanti Om	Herself	Special appearance in song "Deewangi Deewangi"	
2011	Bodyguard	Chhaya	Voice only	
2012	Dangerous Ishhq	Sanjana , Geeta , Salma and Paro (Note: Kapoor played four different characters in this film.)		
2013	Bombay Talkies	Herself	Special appearance in song "Apna Bombay Talkies"	
2018	Zero	Herself	Cameo appearance	
2024	Murder Mubarak	Shehnaz Noorani		

== Television ==
Year	Title	Role	Notes	Ref.
2003–2004	Karishma – The Miracles of Destiny	Devyani and Avni (Note: Kapoor played two different characters in this television show.)		
2008	Aaja Mahi Vay	Judge		
2008–2009	Nach Baliye 4	Judge		
2009	Hans Baliye	Judge		
2013	Indian Princess	Judge		
2019	Dance India Dance 7	Guest Judge		
2021	Indian Idol 12	Herself	Guest appearance	
2021	Super Dancer: Chapter 4	Guest Judge		
2024	India's Best Dancer 4	Judge		

== Web series ==
Year	Title	Role	Notes	Ref.
2020	Mentalhood	Meira Sharma		
2025	Dining with the Kapoors	Herself		
2026	Brown	Rita Brown		
