= List of awards and nominations received by Karisma Kapoor =

Karisma Kapoor awards and nominations
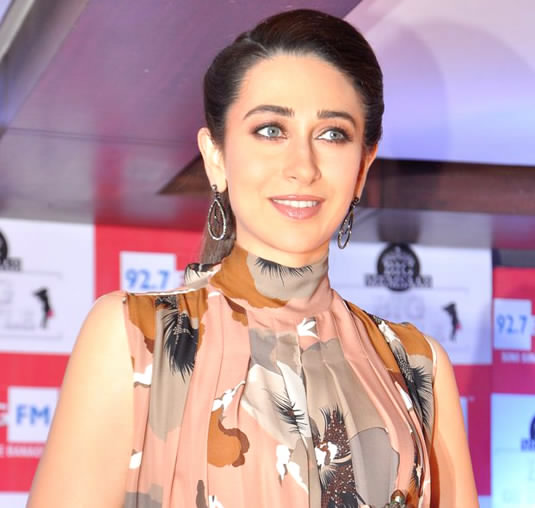
- Kapoor in 2012
Awards and nominations
Award	Wins	Nominations
Bollywood Movie Awards	3	8
Filmfare Awards	4	8
IIFA Awards	1	4
Screen Awards	0	6
Zee Cine Awards	2	8
National Film Awards	1	1

Totals (Note: Certain award groups do not simply award one winner. They acknowledge several different recipients, have runners-up, and have third place. Since this is a specific recognition and is different from losing an award, runner-up mentions are considered wins in this award tally. For simplification and to avoid errors, each award in this list has been presumed to have had a prior nomination.)
- Wins: 21
- Nominations: 50

Karisma Kapoor is an Indian actress who predominantly works in Hindi films. Kapoor is the recipient of a National Film Award for Best Supporting Actress for Dil To Pagal Hai (1997), and four Filmfare Awards out of eight nominations: Best Actress for Raja Hindustani (1996) and Fiza (2000), Best Supporting Actress for Dil To Pagal Hai and Best Actress – Critics for Zubeidaa (2001).

== Bengal Film Journalists' Association Awards ==
Kapoor has one Bengal Film Journalists' Association Awards from one nomination.

Year	Category	Film	Result	Ref.
2001	Best Actress (Hindi)	Fiza	Won	

== Bollywood Movie Awards ==
Kapoor has won three Bollywood Movie Awards out of eight nominations.

Year	Category	Film	Result	Ref.
1997	Best Supporting Actress	Dil To Pagal Hai	Won	
2001	Best Actress	Fiza	Won	
2001	Best Actress – Critics	Fiza	Nominated	
2002	Best Actress – Critics	Zubeidaa	Nominated	
2002	Best Actress	Zubeidaa	Nominated	
2003	Best Actress	Shakti: The Power	Nominated	
2003	Best Actress – Critics	Shakti: The Power	Nominated	
2003	Most Sensational Actress	Shakti: The Power	Won	

== Filmfare Awards ==
Kapoor has won four Filmfare Awards out of eight nominations.

Year	Category	Film	Result	Ref.
1993	Best Female Debut	Sapne Sajan Ke	Nominated	
1997	Best Actress	Raja Hindustani	Won	
1998	Best Supporting Actress	Dil To Pagal Hai	Won	
2000	Best Actress	Biwi No.1	Nominated	
2001	Best Actress	Fiza	Won	
2002	Best Actress	Zubeidaa	Nominated	
2002	Best Actress – Critics	Zubeidaa	Won	
2003	Best Actress	Shakti: The Power	Nominated	

== Filmfare OTT Awards ==
Kapoor has one Filmfare OTT Awards nomination.

Year	Category	Film	Result	Ref.
2024	Best Supporting Actor in a Web Original Film – Female	Murder Mubarak	Nominated	

== International Indian Film Academy Awards ==
Kapoor has won one International Indian Film Academy Awards out of four nominations.

Year	Category	Film	Result	Ref.
2000	Best Actress	Biwi No.1	Nominated	
2001	Best Actress	Fiza	Won	
2003	Best Actress	Shakti: The Power	Nominated	
2009	Star of the Decade – Female	Fiza	Nominated	

== National Film Awards ==
Kapoor has won one National Film Awards.

Year	Category	Film	Result	Ref.
1998	Best Supporting Actress	Dil To Pagal Hai	Won	

== People's Choice Awards India ==
Kapoor has won one People's Choice Awards India out of two nominations.

Year	Category	Film	Result	Ref.
2000	Best Actress	Fiza	Won	
2001	Best Actress	Zubeidaa	Nominated	

== Sansui Viewers' Choice Movie Awards ==
Kapoor has won two Sansui Viewers' Choice Movie Awards out of four nominations.

Year	Category	Film	Result	Ref.
1998	Best Supporting Actress	Dil To Pagal Hai	Won	
2001	Best Actress	Fiza	Nominated	
2001	Best Actress – Critics	Fiza	Won	
2003	Best Actress	Shakti: The Power	Nominated	

== Screen Awards ==
Kapoor has received six Screen Awards nominations.

Year	Category	Film	Result	Ref.
1997	Best Actress	Raja Hindustani	Nominated	
1998	Best Supporting Actress	Dil To Pagal Hai	Nominated	
2000	Best Actress	Biwi No.1	Nominated	
2001	Best Actress	Fiza	Nominated	
2002	Best Actress	Zubeidaa	Nominated	
2003	Best Actress	Shakti: The Power	Nominated	

== Zee Cine Awards ==
Kapoor has won two Zee Cine Awards out of eight nominations.

Year	Category	Film	Result	Ref.
1998	Best Actor – Female	Hero No. 1	Nominated	
1998	Best Actor – Female	Dil To Pagal Hai	Nominated	
1998	Best Actor in a Supporting Role – Female	Dil To Pagal Hai	Won	
2000	Best Actor – Female	Biwi No.1	Nominated	
2001	Best Actor – Female	Fiza	Nominated	
2001	Zee Premiere Choice – Female	Fiza	Won	
2002	Best Actor – Female	Zubeidaa	Nominated	
2003	Best Actor – Female	Shakti: The Power	Nominated	

== Other awards ==
Year	Award	Category	Result	Ref.
2002	Priyadarshni Academy Awards	Smita Patil Memorial Award for Best Actress	Won	
2011	Hello! Hall of Fame Awards	Most Stylish Woman of the Year	Won	
2013	GR8! Women Achievers	Excellence in Versatility	Won	
2016	Vogue Beauty Awards	Ageless Beauty	Won	
2018	Filmfare Glamour And Style Awards	Trailblazer of Fashion	Won	
2024	Pinkvilla Screen and Style Icons Awards	Timeless Fashion Icon	Won	
2024	Bollywood Hungama Style Icons	Eternal Trailblazer of Indian Showbiz	Nominated	
2024	Bollywood Hungama Style Icons	Fashion Icon of the Year	Nominated	

== Honours and recognitions ==
- 2000: Honoured as a Young Achiever by the Indo-American Society Young Achievers Award.
- 2013: Kapoor was placed 4th in The Times of India's "50 Beautiful Faces" list.
- 2018: Honoured with Extraordinary Women Award by Rotary Club of Bombay West.
- 2020: Kapoor was placed 3rd in Rediff.com's "Top OTT Actresses" list.
- 2022: Kapoor was voted "Sexiest Actress Alive" by the Glamour Magazine.
- 2023: Indian Achievers Award for Power Corridors by Government of India.
