= 1st IIFA Awards =

Inaugural Indian Film Academy Awards Ceremony

- Date: 24 June 2000
- Site: Millennium Dome, London
- Hosted by: Yukta Mookhey and Anupam Kher

Highlights
- Best Picture: Hum Dil De Chuke Sanam
- Best Direction: Sanjay Leela Bhansali (Hum Dil De Chuke Sanam)
- Best Actor: Sanjay Dutt (Vaastav: The Reality)
- Best Actress: Aishwarya Rai (Hum Dil De Chuke Sanam)
- Most awards: Hum Dil De Chuke Sanam (11)
- Most nominations: Hum Dil De Chuke Sanam (21)

The first-ever International Indian Film Academy Awards is officially known as 1st IIFA Awards. The award ceremony was held in 2000 at the Millennium Dome in London. It took place on 24 June 2000. During the ceremony, IIFA Awards were awarded in 26 competitive categories.

The ceremony was held at the Millennium Dome and was co-hosted by Yukta Mookhey and Anupam Kher.

Hum Dil De Chuke Sanam led the ceremony with 21 nominations, followed by Taal with 12 nominations and Sarfarosh with 9 nominations.

Hum Dil De Chuke Sanam won 11 awards, including Best Film, Best Director (for Sanjay Leela Bhansali) and Best Actress (for Aishwarya Rai), thus becoming the most-awarded film at the ceremony.

Aishwarya Rai received dual nominations for Best Actress for her performances in Hum Dil De Chuke Sanam and Taal, winning for the former.

Anil Kapoor received dual nominations for Best Supporting Actor for his performances in Biwi No.1 and Taal, winning for the latter.

Sushmita Sen received dual nominations for Best Supporting Actress for her performances in Biwi No.1 and Sirf Tum, winning for the former.

== Awards ==
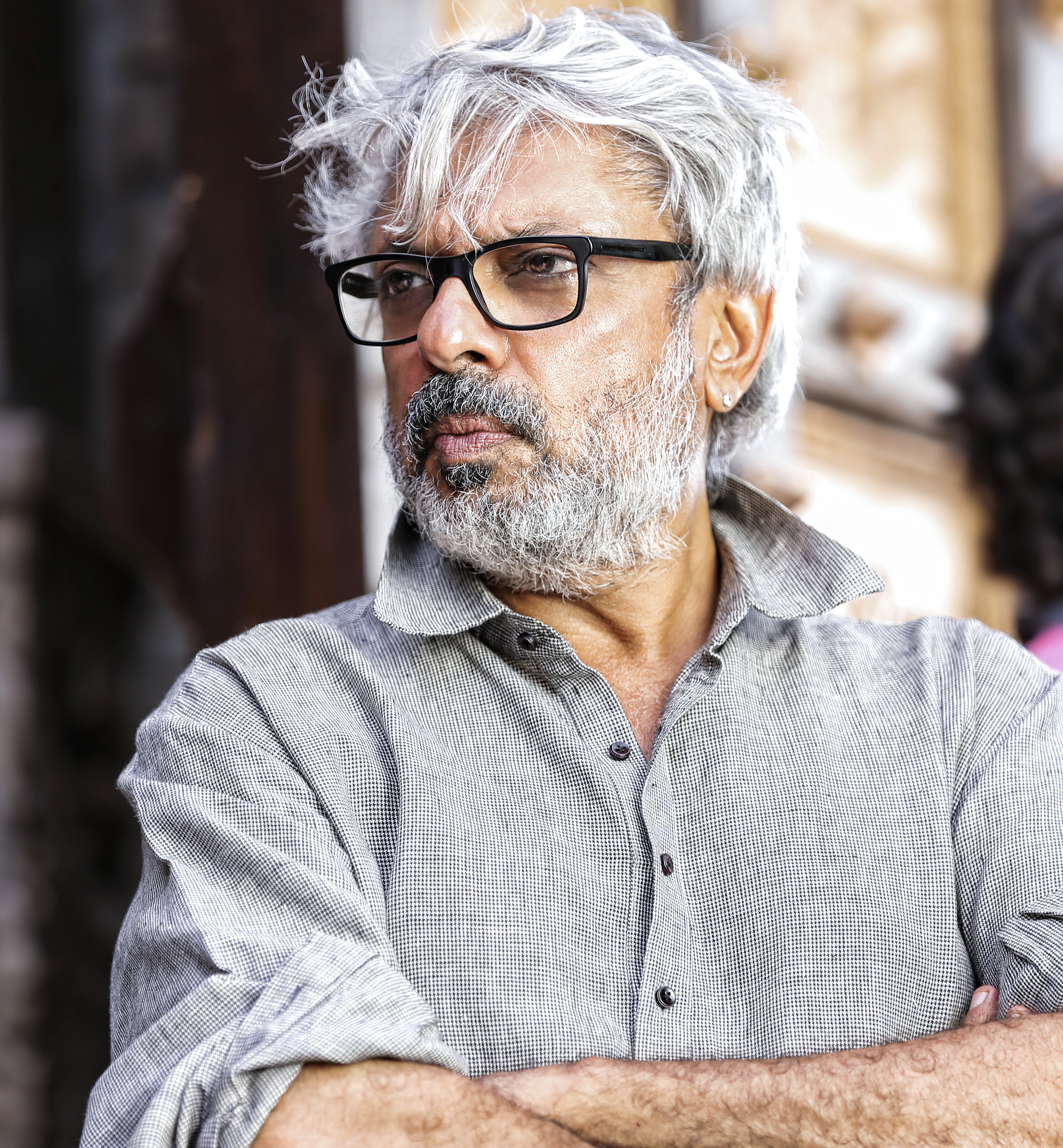
Sanjay Leela Bhansali — Best Director winner for Hum Dil De Chuke Sanam

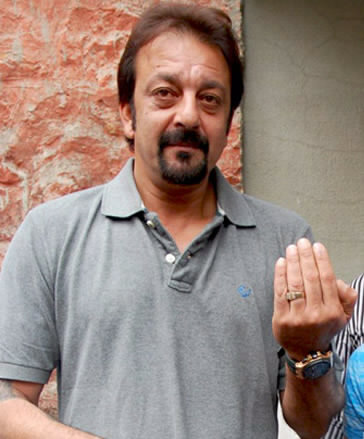
Sanjay Dutt — Best Actor winner for Vaastav: The Reality

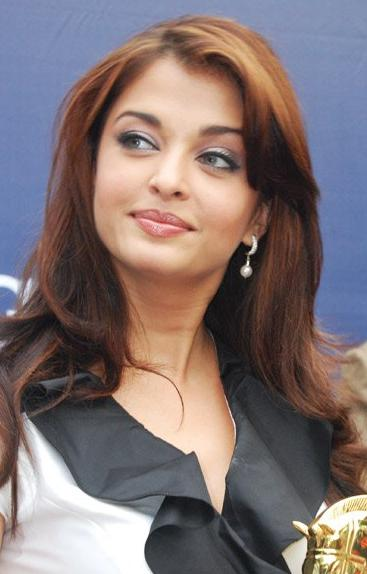
Aishwarya Rai Bachchan — Best Actress winner for Hum Dil De Chuke Sanam

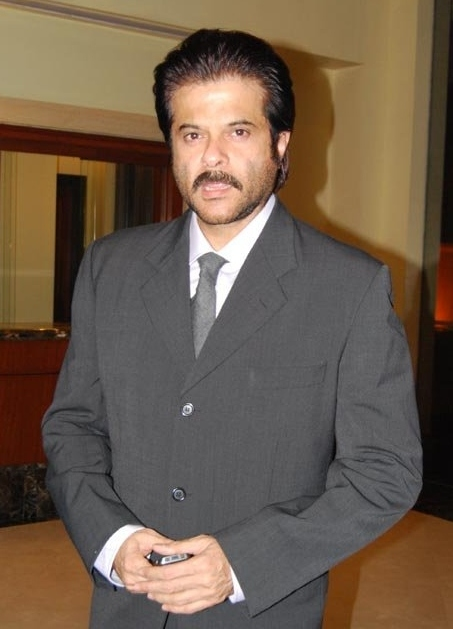
Anil Kapoor — Best Supporting Actor winner for Taal

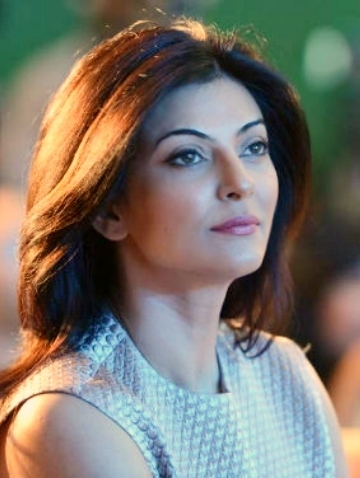
Sushmita Sen — Best Supporting Actress winner for Biwi No.1

The winners and nominees have been listed below. Winners are listed first, highlighted in boldface, and indicated with a double dagger (‡).

=== Popular Awards ===
Best Film	Best Director
**Hum Dil De Chuke Sanam**‡; Biwi No.1; Sarfarosh; Taal; Vaastav: The Reality	**Sanjay Leela Bhansali – Hum Dil De Chuke Sanam**‡; David Dhawan – Biwi No.1; John Matthew Matthan – Sarfarosh; Mahesh Manjrekar – Vaastav: The Reality; Subhash Ghai – Taal
Best Actor	Best Actress
**Sanjay Dutt – Vaastav: The Reality**‡; Aamir Khan – Sarfarosh; Ajay Devgn – Hum Dil De Chuke Sanam; Govinda – Haseena Maan Jaayegi; Salman Khan – Hum Dil De Chuke Sanam	**Aishwarya Rai Bachchan – Hum Dil De Chuke Sanam**‡; Aishwarya Rai Bachchan – Taal; Kajol – Hum Aapke Dil Mein Rehte Hain; Karisma Kapoor – Biwi No.1; Sonali Bendre – Sarfarosh
Best Supporting Actor	Best Supporting Actress
**Anil Kapoor – Taal**‡; Anil Kapoor – Biwi No.1; Jackie Shroff – Kartoos; Mukesh Rishi – Sarfarosh; Sanjay Dutt – Daag	**Sushmita Sen – Biwi No.1**‡; Aruna Irani – Haseena Maan Jaayegi; Reema Lagoo – Vaastav: The Reality; Sushmita Sen – Sirf Tum; Tabu – Biwi No.1
Best Performance in a Negative Role	Best Performance in a Comic Role
**Naseeruddin Shah – Sarfarosh**‡; Ashutosh Rana – Jaanwar; Mohan Joshi – Vaastav: The Reality; Mukesh Rishi – Arjun Pandit; Raj Babbar – Daag	**Anil Kapoor – Biwi No.1**‡; Anupam Kher – Haseena Maan Jaayegi; Jatin Kanakia – Khoobsurat; Johnny Lever – Anari No.1; Sanjay Dutt – Khoobsurat
Best Music Director	Best Lyricist
**A. R. Rahman – Taal**‡; Anu Malik – Haseena Maan Jaayegi; Dilip Sen–Sameer Sen – Arjun Pandit; Ismail Darbar – Hum Dil De Chuke Sanam; Nadeem–Shravan – Sirf Tum	**Anand Bakshi – "Ishq Bina" – Taal**‡; Israr Ansari – "Zindagi Maut Na Ban Jaye" – Sarfarosh; Mehboob – "Aankhon Ki Gustakhiyan" – Hum Dil De Chuke Sanam; Mehboob – "Chand Chupa Badal Mein" – Hum Dil De Chuke Sanam; Mehboob – "Tadap Tadap" – Hum Dil De Chuke Sanam
Best Male Playback Singer	Best Female Playback Singer
**Udit Narayan – "Chand Chupa Badal Mein" – Hum Dil De Chuke Sanam**‡; KK – "Tadap Tadap" – Hum Dil De Chuke Sanam; Kumar Sanu – "Aankhon Ki Gustakhiyan" – Hum Dil De Chuke Sanam; Sonu Nigam – "Ishq Bina" – Taal; Sukhwinder Singh – "Ramta Jogi" – Taal	**Alka Yagnik – "Taal Se Taal" – Taal**‡; Anuradha Sriram – "Ishq Bina" – Taal; Kavita Krishnamurti – "Aankhon Ki Gustakhiyan" – Hum Dil De Chuke Sanam; Kavita Krishnamurti – "Hum Dil De Chuke Sanam" – Hum Dil De Chuke Sanam; Sunidhi Chauhan – "Kya Dekh Rahe Ho Tum" – Taal

=== Technical Awards ===
Best Story	Best Screenplay
**Pratap Karvat, Sanjay Leela Bhansali – Hum Dil De Chuke Sanam**‡; Bhupathi Raja – Hum Aapke Dil Mein Rehte Hain; John Matthew Matthan – Sarfarosh; Mahesh Manjrekar – Vaastav: The Reality; Sooraj Barjatya – Hum Saath-Saath Hain	**Sanjay Leela Bhansali – Hum Dil De Chuke Sanam**‡
Best Dialogue	Best Cinematography
**Amrik Gill – Hum Dil De Chuke Sanam**‡	**Anil Mehta – Hum Dil De Chuke Sanam**‡
Best Editing	Best Art Direction
**V.N. Mayekar – Vaastav: The Reality**‡	**Keshto Mandal – Sarfarosh**‡
Best Background Score	Best Choreography
**Vishal Bhardwaj – Godmother**‡	**Saroj Khan – "Nimbooda" – Hum Dil De Chuke Sanam**‡
Best Costume Design	Best Makeup
**Neeta Lulla – Taal**‡	**Jayanti Shevale – Hum Saath-Saath Hain**‡
Best Sound Recording	Best Sound Re-Recording
**Jitendra Arya – Hum Dil De Chuke Sanam**‡	**Suresh Kathuria – Hum Dil De Chuke Sanam**‡
Best Special Effects	Best Song Recording
**Raj Taru (Video Sonic Ltd) – Hindustan Ki Kasam**‡	**Satish Gupta – "Khaali Dil Nahin Jaan Bhi Yeh Mangda" – Kachche Dhaage**‡

=== Special awards ===
Lifetime Achievement Award	Madame Tussauds Honour
**Sunil Dutt**	**Amitabh Bachchan**
Personality of The Year	Sony Set Max Maximum IIFA
**Aishwarya Rai Bachchan**	**Shah Rukh Khan**
Excellence In Indian Cinema	Outstanding Contribution To Indian Cinema
**Jackie Chan**	**Lata Mangeshkar**
Outstanding Indian Achievement In International Cinema	Outstanding Achievement In Indian Cinema
**Shekhar Kapur**	**East Is East**

== Superlatives ==
Multiple nominations
Nominations	Film
21	Hum Dil De Chuke Sanam
12	Taal
9	Sarfarosh
7	Biwi No.1
7	Vaastav: The Reality
6	Haseena Maan Jaayegi
2	Arjun Pandit
2	Daag
2	Hum Aapke Dil Mein Rehte Hain
2	Hum Saath-Saath Hain
2	Khoobsurat
2	Sirf Tum

Multiple wins
Awards	Film
11	Hum Dil De Chuke Sanam
5	Taal
2	Sarfarosh
2	Vaastav: The Reality
