= Brown (2026 TV series) =

2026 Indian Hindi-language crime thriller web series

- Genre: Crime thriller; Psychological thriller; Neo-noir
- Based on: City of Death by Abheek Barua
- Screenplay by: Diggi Sisodia; Sunayana Kumari; Mayukh Ghosh
- Directed by: Abhinay Deo
- Starring: Karisma Kapoor; Surya Sharma; Jisshu Sengupta; Soni Razdan; Meghna Malik; Ajinkya Deo
- Music by: Gaurav Chatterji
- Country of origin: India
- Original language: Hindi
- No. of seasons: 1
- No. of episodes: 7

Production
- Producer: Umesh Kumar Bansal Raedita Tandan
- Cinematography: Amogh Deshpande
- Editor: Huzefa Lokhandwala
- Production company: Zee Studios

Original release
- Network: ZEE5

Brown is a 2026 Indian Hindi-language psychological thriller web series directed by Abhinay Deo and produced by Zee Studios. It is based on City of Death, a 2016 novel by Abheek Barua, with the screenplay written by Diggi Sisodia, Sunayana Kumari, and Mayukh Ghosh. It stars Karisma Kapoor as a Kolkata detective, alongside Surya Sharma, Jisshu Sengupta, Soni Razdan and Ajinkya Deo. The series premiered on ZEE5 on 5 June 2026.

Set in Kolkata, the series follows Rita Brown, an Anglo-Indian detective with the Kolkata Police Force who investigates the murder of a teenager from a prominent family while dealing with alcoholism and personal trauma. In 2023, it was selected for Berlinale Series Market Selects, the first Indian web series chosen for that programme.

== Background ==
Zee Studios developed Brown from Abheek Barua's novel City of Death (2016) over roughly two years before its international debut. The studio financed and produced it independently, without a platform commission. Zee Studios president Shariq Patel told Deadline that this approach let the studio retain ownership of the intellectual property while leaving it free to license the series afterwards. In February 2023, the series was selected for the Berlinale Series Market Selects section of the Berlin International Film Festival, alongside Zee Studios' Marathi-language feature Aatma Pamphlet.

At the Berlinale, Karisma Kapoor told Variety that the character Rita Brown appealed to her precisely because she was far from her earlier work: "flawed, but human," and a role that required dropping the glamour of her film career. Brown is Kapoor's return to a lead streaming role after Mentalhood (2020) on ALTBalaji and the film Murder Mubarak (2024) on Netflix. The series also features playback singer Shaan in his acting debut.

== Plot ==
Rita Brown is a detective with the Kolkata Police Force from the city's Anglo-Indian community. She is a recovering alcoholic assigned to investigate the murder of a teenager from a well-connected Kolkata family. The case pulls her into layers of corruption and concealed history, while she is simultaneously managing her own addiction and its effects on her work. Jisshu Sengupta plays a psychiatrist connected to the investigation.

== Cast ==
- Karisma Kapoor as Rita Brown
- Surya Sharma as Arjun Sinha
- Jisshu Sengupta as Sandip Chakraborty, psychiatrist
- Soni Razdan as Janice Brown
- Helen as Aunt Bertha
- Shaan as Nitin Goswami (Special appearance)
- Ajinkya Deo as Dheeraj Jaiswal
- Meghna Malik as Nonnie Jaiswal
- Aniruddh Roy as Rahman (Cyber Cell)
- Paresh Pahuja as Sanjay Jaiswal
- Aryann Bhowmik as Saikat
- Anupam Bhattacharya as Anirban
- Vaibhavi Malhotra as Ahana Jaiswal
- Ahalya Shetty as Shefali
- Jayashree as Usha Jain
- K. K. Raina as Sukumar Sinha, Arjun's Father
- Pamela Bhutoria as Ananya
- Harsh Mishra as Ankit
- Latin Ghai as Hemant
- Kenny Basumatray as John John
- Leena Lal as Lisa
- Neha Zulka as Divya, Arjun's wife
- Subhashis Chakraborty as Constable Madan

== Production ==
Abhinay Deo, known for directing Delhi Belly (2011) and the Indian adaptation of 24, directed Brown. The screenplay was written by Diggi Sisodia, Sunayana Kumari, and Mayukh Ghosh, adapted from Barua's novel. Suri Gopalan created the series in collaboration with Barua; Zee Studios produced it.

The series is set and shot in Kolkata, whose architecture and street atmosphere inform its neo-noir visual tone.

== Release ==
A teaser was released on 26 May 2026. The full trailer followed on 30 May 2026. The series premiered on ZEE5 on 5 June 2026.

== Reception ==
Shubhra Gupta of The Indian Express gave 2 stars out of 5 and writes that "And in its first couple of episodes, this 7-episode show, which has been hanging fire for a while, does grab our attention." Deepa Gahlot writing for the Rediff.com gave 3.5 stars out of 5 and noted that "Karisma Kapoor makes a powerful return to the screen in Brown, a compelling series." Shreyas Pande writing for The Hindu observes that "Director Abhinay Deo crafts an intriguing world of characters only to later let monotony set in as the screenplay doesn’t take any creative leaps".

Prachi Arya of India Today gave 3.5 stars out of 5 and said that "Brown works best as a psychological crime drama that relies more on its characters and mood than on shock value. Its haunting Kolkata setting, strong performances and well-paced mystery keep you invested throughout, even if the constant emphasis on grief and trauma can feel a little repetitive at times." Archika Khurana of The Times of India rated it 3.5/5 stars and writes that "Watch it if you enjoy atmospheric slow-burn crime thrillers that focus more on complex characters and psychological depth than traditional whodunnit twists."

Nandini Ramnath of Scroll.in felt that "Brown follows the beats of crime thrillers to a fault, it benefits from well-written characters with defined arcs and solid scenes. The show is well-produced, appropriately grim-looking and gripping. The dialogue is mostly in Hindi with lashings of Bengali and English." Rahul Desai of The Hollywood Reporter India desrcibe it as a "A good-looking but banal crime thriller."

Lachmi Deb Roy of Firstpost gave 4 stars out of 5 and writes that "Karisma Kapoor’s Brown has the magnetic ability to put you in deep thought. Each episode is long and so immersive that it will not only emotionally drain you out but will also teach you how to deal with grief." Monica Yadav writing for Hindustan Times rated it 3/5 stars and said that "If you love slow-burn, atmospheric noir or want to see a career-redefining performance from Karisma Kapoor, Brown is worth your time." Shreyanka Mazumdar of News 18 gave 3.5 stars out of 5 and priase the performance saying that "Karisma Kapoor delivers one of the finest performances of her career in Brown, a dark and absorbing crime thriller."
