= Karisma Kapoor =

Indian actress (Born 1974)

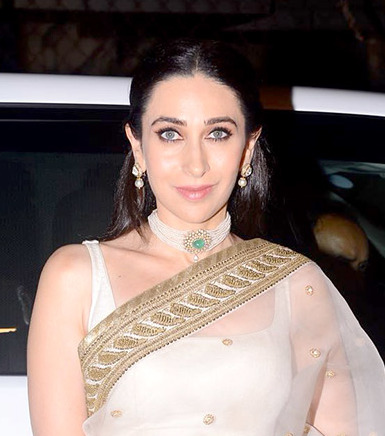
- Kapoor in 2018
- Born: 25 June 1974 (age 52); Bombay, Maharashtra, India
- Occupation: Actress
- Years active: 1990–present
- Works: Full list
- Spouse: Sunjay Kapur (m. 2003; div. 2016)
- Children: 2
- Parents: Randhir Kapoor (father); Babita Kapoor (mother)
- Family: Kapoor family

Karisma Kapoor (pronounced /kəˈrɪzmə kəˈpuːr, kəˈrɪʃmə/; born 25 June 1974) is an Indian actress who primarily appears in Hindi films. One of the leading and highest-paid actresses of the 1990s, she became the first female member of the Kapoor family by birth to pursue a career in acting. Kapoor is the recipient of several accolades, including a National Film Award and four Filmfare Awards.

Kapoor was born to actors Randhir Kapoor and Babita Kapoor, and is the sister of actress Kareena Kapoor. She made her acting debut with a leading role in the moderately successful Prem Qaidi (1991). Subsequently, Kapoor starred in a number of box office hits, including the dramas Jigar (1992) and Anari (1993), the comedies Raja Babu (1994), Andaz Apna Apna (1994), Coolie No. 1 (1995) and Saajan Chale Sasural (1996), and the thriller Jeet (1996). However, she was criticized for her brief, repetitive roles and inclination to male-dominated films.

The 1996 blockbuster romance Raja Hindustani marked a significant turning point in Kapoor's career, earning her praise and a Filmfare Award for Best Actress. She later won the National Film Award and Filmfare Award for Best Supporting Actress for her portrayal of a passionate dancer in the musical romance Dil To Pagal Hai (1997). Kapoor achieved further success by featuring as the female lead in three of David Dhawan's top-grossing romantic comedies—Hero No.1 (1997), Biwi No.1 (1999) and Dulhan Hum Le Jayenge (2000), and in Sooraj Barjatya's highly successful family drama Hum Saath-Saath Hain (1999)—and won the Best Actress and Best Actress Critics awards at Filmfare for her titular roles in the dramas Fiza (2000) and Zubeidaa (2001). Kapoor took a sabbatical from full-time acting in 2004 and has since appeared sporadically in various projects, including the web series Mentalhood (2020) and the mystery thriller Murder Mubarak (2024).

Kapoor was married to businessman Sanjay Kapur from 2003–2016; the couple had two children together. Her off-screen life is a subject of substantial media coverage. Kapoor has played the titular character in the television series Karishma: The Miracles of Destiny (2003–2004) and has featured as a talent judge for several reality shows. Alongside her acting career, Kapoor participates in stage shows and is a prominent celebrity endorser for various products.

== Early life and background ==
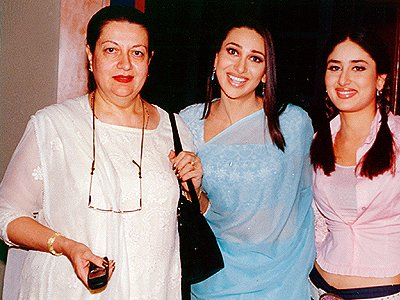
Kapoor with her mother Babita (left) and sister Kareena (right) at an event in 2003

Karisma Kapoor was born on 25 June 1974 in Bombay, Maharashtra, to actors, Babita (née Shivdasani) and Randhir Kapoor. Her younger sister, Kareena Kapoor, is a film actress who is married to actor Saif Ali Khan. Her paternal grandfather was the actor and filmmaker Raj Kapoor, while her maternal grandfather was actor Hari Shivdasani. Her paternal great-grandfather was actor Prithviraj Kapoor. The actors Rishi Kapoor and Rajiv Kapoor are her uncles, while the actress Neetu Singh is her aunt. Her first cousins is the actor Ranbir Kapoor and the businessman Nikhil Nanda. The actors Shammi Kapoor and Shashi Kapoor are her grand-uncles, and the late actress Sadhana was her mother's first cousin.

Kapoor is informally called as "Lolo" at her home. According to Kapoor, the name Lolo was derived after her mother made a passing reference to the Italian actress Gina Lollobrigida. Her paternal and maternal grandparents were from Peshawar, Lyallpur and Karachi respectively, who moved to Bombay for their film careers before the partition of India. Kapoor is of Punjabi descent on her father's side, and on her mother's side she is of Sindhi and British descent.

Particularly inspired by the work of actresses Sridevi and Madhuri Dixit, Kapoor was keen on pursuing acting since childhood. While growing up, Kapoor regularly attended award ceremonies and accompanied her parents to film sets. However, despite her family background, her father disapproved of women working in films, because he believed it conflicted with the traditional maternal duties and responsibility of women in the family. This led to a conflict between her parents and they separated in 1988. She and her sister Kareena were raised by their mother, who worked several jobs to raise them, until she made her debut in films as an actress. The couple reconciled in 2007, after living separately for several years. Kapoor studied at the Cathedral and John Connon School, Mumbai, and later, for a few months, at Sophia College for Women, Mumbai. Kapoor later said that she left college to pursue acting for financial support.

== Career ==
=== Debut and early roles (1991–1995) ===
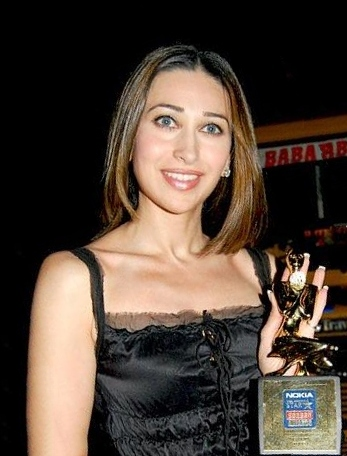
Kapoor at the Screen Awards in 2008

Kapoor made her acting debut in 1991 at the age of 16 with the romantic drama Prem Qaidi, opposite debutant Harish Kumar. Upon release, the film emerged as a moderate box office success and received mixed reviews from critics, as did Kapoor's performance, with Taran Adarsh of Bollywood Hungama describing it as "mechanical". The following year, Kapoor's first five releases—Police Officer, Jaagruti, Nishchaiy, Sapne Sajan Ke and Deedar—flopped at the box office. Sapne Sajan Ke earned her a nomination for Filmfare Award for Best Female Debut. Jaagruti and Nishchaiy marked her first two collaborations with Salman Khan, while Deedar marked her first collaboration with Akshay Kumar. She next starred in the action drama Jigar (1992), followed by the romantic drama Anari (1993), both of which emerged as box office hits and among the highest-grossing films of their respective years. Jigar marked Kapoor's first of several collaborations with Ajay Devgn, while Anari featured her in the leading role of Rajnandini, a princess who falls in love with her poor servant (played by Daggubati Venkatesh).

Kapoor's next four releases of 1993 were the dramas Muqabla (which marked first of her many collaborations with Govinda), Sangraam, Shaktiman and Dhanwaan. With the exception of Muqabla, none of these films performed well either critically or commercially. In 1994, Kapoor had nine film releases – four of them — Prem Shakti, Dulaara, Andaz and Aatish — were critical and commercial failures. Her first hit that year was David Dhawan's comedy film Raja Babu, opposite Govinda, in which she played Madhubala, an educated arrogant girl who calls off her engagement upon discovering her fiancée's illiteracy. Kapoor next played the blind wife of Govinda's character in the hit action drama Khuddar, following which she starred with Salman Khan, Aamir Khan and Raveena Tandon in Rajkumar Santoshi's acclaimed comedy film Andaz Apna Apna. Kapoor played Raveena Bajaj, the daughter of a London-based business tycoon, who travels to India in search of true love, and falls for Salman Khan's character. Although the film underperformed at the box office, it developed a significant cult following over the years since its release.

Kapoor's final two releases of the year were the action drama Suhaag (alongside Ajay Devgn, Akshay Kumar and Nagma) and the comedy-drama Gopi Kishan (alongside Suniel Shetty and Shilpa Shirodkar), both of which were critically and commercially successful. In the former, she starred as a college student and Devgn's love interest, while in the latter, she played a police commissioner's daughter who falls in love with a criminal. In 1995, after appearing in the box office flops Jawab and Maidan-E-Jung, Kapoor starred as Malti, a rich girl who marries a poor coolie (played by Govinda) in David Dhawan's blockbuster comedy film Coolie No. 1. The film garnered positive reviews and emerged as a commercial success, grossing ₹911 million (US$9.7 million) in India. It later gained a cult following. On her initial career struggle, she later said:

When I first entered the industry, things were made tough for me. I am not saying that I was singled out. I think every star kid has to go through this. Everyone was so unfair to me. Other newcomers were praised for every little achievement, but I was not given an iota of acknowledgement. When it came to me, it was always, 'Okay, she has done well, but what's the big deal about her?'. Nobody gave a 17-year-old credit for doing my job reasonably well.

=== Established actress (1996–2000) ===
In 1996, Kapoor appeared in 10 films. Five of them — Papi Gudia, Megha, Bal Bramhachari, Sapoot and Rakshak — were commercially unsuccessful. Her next release was David Dhawan's romantic comedy Saajan Chale Sasural, co-starring Govinda and Tabu. Saajan Chale Sasural emerged as a commercial success. For her fifth release, Kapoor was paired opposite Suneil Shetty in S. Deepak's box office hit Krishna. She starred alongside Sunny Deol, Salman Khan and Tabu in Raj Kanwar's romantic drama Jeet. She played Kajal, a woman who falls in love with a criminal, but ends up marrying another man. Finishing up as the second highest-grossing film of the year, Jeet emerged as a "super-hit" at the box office. Critical reaction was positive on both the film as well as Kapoor's performance.

That same year, Kapoor starred in Dharmesh Darshan's romantic drama Raja Hindustani opposite Aamir Khan, in which she played a rich, beautiful heiress who falls for a lowly guide and driver. A modern-day remake of Jab Jab Phool Khile (1965), the film emerged as the highest-grossing film of the year and won Kapoor her first Filmfare Award for Best Actress. Reviewing her performance for India Today, Anupama Chopra described Kapoor as a "revelation" and "the lifeblood of this otherwise banal film." The film's success established Kapoor as a leading actress of Hindi cinema, and marked a significant turning point in her career. Raja Hindustani was not only the biggest commercial success of 1996, but also one of the most successful films of all time in India with worldwide revenues of ₹765 million (US$8.2 million). Kapoor's final release of 1996 was Suneel Darshan's action film Ajay, with Sunny Deol. The film was also a financial success.

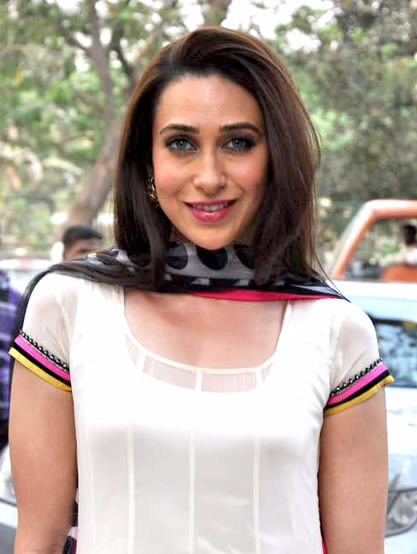
Kapoor at an event in 2013

In 1997, Kapoor re-united with David Dhawan for two projects, the comedy film Judwaa (alongside Salman Khan and Rambha), and the romantic comedy Hero No. 1 (opposite Govinda). The former's concept was similar to Gopi Kishan – it tells the story of twin brothers who are separated at birth and re-unite in their youth. Kapoor and Rambha played the love interests of Khan's characters. In Hero No. 1, she played Meena Nath, a girl who falls in love with Govinda's character despite facing disapproval from her strict grandfather (played by Paresh Rawal). Both films were critically and commercially successful, and Kapoor gained praise for her comedic timing. She eventually received a nomination for the Zee Cine Award for Best Actress for Hero No. 1. She next starred in the Mehul Kumar-directed dramas Lahu Ke Do Rang and Mrityudata, both of which were critical and commercial failures.

Kapoor's fifth and final release of 1997 was Yash Chopra's musical romantic drama Dil To Pagal Hai. Co-starring Shah Rukh Khan, Madhuri Dixit and Akshay Kumar, the film depicts the love lives of the cast and crew in a musical dance troupe. Kapoor played Nisha, a bubbly dancer who secretly falls in love with her best friend (played by Khan), who unites with the girl he loves (played by Dixit). Initially hesitant to take on the supporting role, Kapoor was cast by Chopra (who was impressed by her work in Raja Hindustani) after several leading actresses of the time had rejected it. Dil To Pagal Hai emerged as a blockbuster at the box office and proved to be the highest-grossing film of the year. Kapoor received widespread praise for her portrayal, and she eventually won the National Film Award and Filmfare Award for Best Supporting Actress.

Kapoor's diminutive comeback in 1999 proved to be good as she took part in the year's most successful films. Kapoor starred in four hits. She next re-united with Dhawan and Salman Khan (alongside Sushmita Sen) for the romantic comedy Biwi No.1, in which she portrayed Pooja, a woman whose husband gets involved in an extra-marital affair with a model. The film, which emerged as a major commercial success, earned Kapoor critical praise for her performance. Kapoor received a second Best Actress nomination at Filmfare for her work in the film. She proved to be successful with comedy films, as another of David Dhawan's films Haseena Maan Jaayegi, did fairly well at the box office. Kapoor collaborated for the first time with the Rajshri Productions for the family drama Hum Saath-Saath Hain: We Stand United, opposite Saif Ali Khan. The film featured an ensemble cast (Mohnish Behl, Salman Khan, Sonali Bendre and Tabu), proving to be one of the biggest Hindi film successes of all time in the market, earning ₹817 million (US$8.7 million) worldwide. Alok Kumar stated, "Karisma doesn't have much to do, but looks good in doing whatever she does." Her last release of the year, Jaanwar, opposite Akshay Kumar, was another box office hit, making her the most successful actress of the year. Silsila Hai Pyar Ka was her other film of the year.

Kapoor's first release of 2000 was Dhawan's romantic comedy Dulhan Hum Le Jayenge, opposite Salman Khan. She played Sapna, a girl who falls for Khan's character while on a foreign trip, however, she finds it tough to convince her three uncles of this relationship. The film finished up as one of the biggest hits of the year. Aparajita Saha of Rediff commented: "Karisma Kapoor and Salman Khan elicit more than their fair share of cat-calls in the movie and make a delectable pair. Both are in form – Karisma kapoor looks glamorous and at ease while Salman khan has perfected the lost-boy-muscle-man get-up". Kapoor's next two releases, the romantic comedies Chal Mere Bhai (opposite Khan and Dutt) and Hum To Mohabbat Karega (opposite Bobby Deol) failed to do well at the box office.

That same year, Kapoor won her second Filmfare Award for Best Actress, for portraying the title role of a disillusioned girl in search of her brother, in Khalid Mohammed's acclaimed crime drama Fiza. Cast against type in a non-glamorous role, her performance was highly applauded, several critics noted her for showing great emotional range and depth. Mimmy Jain of The Indian Express, in a positive review, wrote: "As the young girl who is sick of the suspense and disruption that her brother's disappearance has caused in her family's life, as the obstinate daughter who will not listen to her mother's plea to let her keep hoping for her son, as the determined sister who keeps on in her hunt for her brother despite all odds and then seeks to keep him on the right path, this is a new Karisma, and one that delivers a superbly flawless performance." The film emerged as a "semi-hit" at the box office with a worldwide gross of ₹878 million (US$9.4 million).

=== Critical recognition and hiatus (2001–2011) ===
In 2001, she achieved further critical acclaim for her portrayal of an ill-fated actress in the biographical drama Zubeidaa. Directed by Shyam Benegal, the film was based on the life of Zubeida Begum, who married Hanwant Singh. The Tribune complimented her by arguing that she "has surpassed herself as the passionate, defiant, wilful and troubled Zubeidaa, the truly modern woman." In an interview with Rediff she explained: "I have been here so long, I have done everything. lead roles, supporting roles, everything. How do I grow as a performer? If I keep doing commercial cinema, I will stagnate and I wanted to grow". For her work, she won the Filmfare Critics Award for Best Actress and garnered a Best Actress nomination at the ceremony. Co-starring Rekha and Manoj Bajpai, the film had worldwide earnings of over ₹239.552 million (US$2.6 million). She next starred alongside Bobby Deol and Rahul Dev in Indra Kumar's Aashiq – the movie received little praise from critics, though it proved to be a modest success, grossing over ₹260 million (US$2.8 million) domestically. Suneel Darshan's social drama Ek Rishtaa: The Bond of Love was Kapoor's next release. Co-starring Amitabh Bachchan and Akshay Kumar, the film became one of the biggest hits of the year.

In 2002, Kapoor had three film releases, the first of which was the romantic drama Haan Maine Bhi Pyaar Kiya, opposite Akshay Kumar and Abhishek Bachchan. She next starred alongside Nana Patekar in the woman-centric drama Shakti: The Power, playing the role of Nandini, a woman who wants to escape from her in-laws (involved in feudal gang wars) along with her son, after her husband's death. The film, a remake of the Telugu film Antahpuram (1998), was itself based on the life of author Betty Mahmoody. Shakti: The Power was critically acclaimed and also earned Kapoor highly positive reviews for her portrayal – Taran Adarsh reviewed: "The power clearly belongs to Kapoor. Breathing fire and venom to win back her son from the clutches of a despot, the actress gives it all to the character of a helpless mother and proves what a virtuoso performer she is. Playing the part of a wounded tigress, this is one performance that overshadows all the performances the year has seen so far". Kapoor's work in the film earned her Best Actress nominations at several award ceremonies, including a fifth nomination at Filmfare. Her final release that year was Indra Kumar's romantic drama Rishtey, alongside Anil Kapoor and Shilpa Shetty. She featured as Komal, a wealthy woman who falls in love with a poorer man and marries him against her father's wishes. Despite much anticipation, Kapoor's all three releases that year underperformed at the box office.

In 2003, she starred in Baaz: A Bird in Danger opposite Dino Morea, which was her only release that year. The film performed poorly at the box-office. Later in the same year, she made her television debut in the Sahara One soap opera Karishma – The Miracles of Destiny, in which she played a dual role of a grandmother and granddaughter. The serial ended after 260 episodes in 2004 and she took a sabbatical from full-time acting for several years.

In 2006, Kapoor was seen in Mere Jeevan Saathi – the film had been shot and completed in 2003, but was delayed for three years. She played the role of an obsessive lover opposite Akshay Kumar and the film became a box office bomb. In 2008, she first judged Aaja Mahi Vay and later alongside actor Arjun Rampal and director–choreographer Farah Khan, Kapoor began judging season four of the dance show Nach Baliye, and continued the following year with the comedy show Hans Baliye. In addition to this, she had a cameo in the song "Deewangi Deewangi" from the 2007 melodrama Om Shanti Om, and in 2008, was as a guest on the reality television show Wife Bina Life (2010). In 2011, Kapoor voiced sister Kareena Kapoor's character in the film Bodyguard.

=== Intermittent work and streaming projects (2012–present) ===
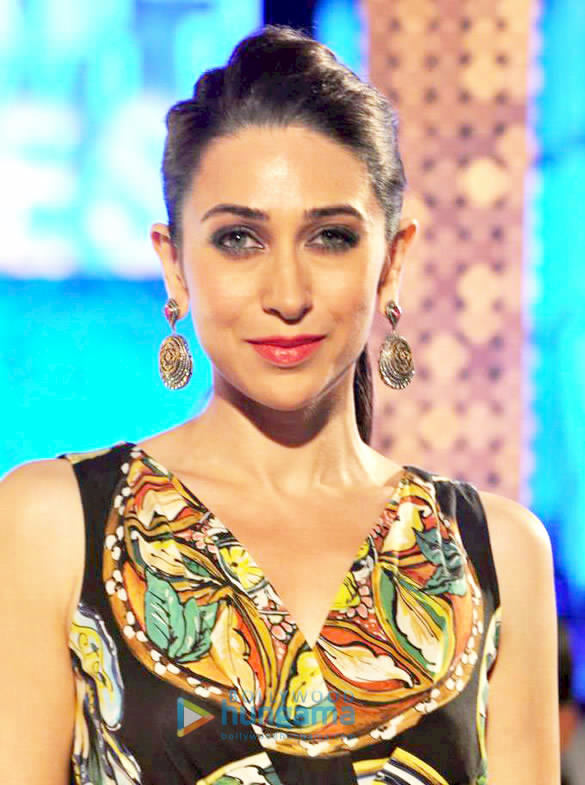
Kapoor at an event in 2013

Kapoor made her comeback as an actress with a leading role in Vikram Bhatt's supernatural thriller Dangerous Ishhq, in 2012. Co-starring Rajneesh Duggal, the film spans a period of four centuries and tells four different love stories set in different time periods. Kapoor played four characters, one from each century. Although the film was a major critical and box office failure, it generated positive reviews for Kapoor's portrayal. Taran Adarsh of Bollywood Hungama commented: "Kapoor puts forth her best efforts, getting to deliver lines in varied dialects. She gets the dialects right, especially Urdu and Rajasthani, but there's not much scope for her to display her acting prowess". In 2013, Kapoor made a special appearance along with several other actors in the titular song of the anthology film Bombay Talkies, which was made to honour the Hindi film industry for completing a centenary. She later appeared on the show Indian Princess.

In 2018, Kapoor made a special appearance in the Aanand L. Rai-directed romantic comedy Zero. Kapoor made her web debut with Ekta Kapoor's Mentalhood that released on ALTBalaji in 2020. The series revolves around different natures of mothers and showcases how they try their best to raise their children. Devansh Sharma of Firstpost opined, "One gradually warms up to Karisma in Mentalhood. Not at any point does she attempt to steal the spotlight, and blends well into the stellar ensemble the show offers."

In 2024, Kapoor made her comeback to films, with Homi Adajania's mystery-thriller, Murder Mubarak, portraying a sophisticated actress. Pratikshya Mishra from The Quint praised her for playing an "elusive star" and noted, "The tragedy evident in her characterisation comes through purely because of how expressive her eyes can be." She received the Filmfare OTT Award for Best Supporting Actor in a Web Original Film – Female nomination for the film. Later that year, she made her comeback to television as a judge on India's Best Dancer 4 and returned to judge season 5 in 2026. In 2025, she also appeared in the variety series, Dining With The Kapoors.

Kapoor portrayed a police officer in the 2026 series Brown, based on City of Death, a 2016 novel by Abheek Barua. In 2023, it became the first Indian series to be selected for the Berlinale Series Market Selects. Reviewing the series, Archika Khurana noted, "Karisma delivers one of the strongest performances of her career. Battling inner demons or chasing leads through dangerous territory, Kapoor lends the character authenticity and emotional depth."

== Personal life ==
She was engaged to Abhishek Bachchan in 2002 after multiple years together, but the engagement was called off after a few months.

On 29 September 2003, she married industrialist Sunjay Kapur, the CEO of Sixt India, in a high-profile Sikh wedding ceremony at her ancestral home, Krishna Raj Bungalow, in Mumbai. The couple has a daughter, Samaira, born on 11 March 2005 and a son, Kiaan, born on 12 March 2010. In 2014, the couple filed for divorce through mutual consent. In November 2015, the couple had filed applications to withdraw their consent to it. The couple's divorce was finalised in 2016.

In 2016, Karisma Kapoor filed a domestic violence case against Sunjay Kapur and his mother, accusing them of physical abuse and claiming Sunjay was involved with another woman. She also filed a dowry harassment case, leading to a summons for Sunjay by the Mumbai police. The couple was already locked in a bitter divorce and custody battle.

On taking a break from her acting career for her kids and family, Kapoor said, it was a "conscious decision". She further said,

"It [acting] is ingrained in you. It is something that never goes away. I was waiting for something really interesting. It was out of my choice that I didn't do any film because my kids were very young. I wanted to be at home with my family and children."

After the death of her ex-husband Sunjay Kapur in June 2025, his children with actor Karisma Kapoor, Samaira Kapur and Kiaan Raj Kapur, initiated legal proceedings in the Delhi High Court challenging the validity of a will presented by Kapur’s widow, Priya Sachdev Kapur. The children alleged that the will, which reportedly left most of Kapur’s estimated ₹30,000-crore estate to Priya Sachdev, was forged or irregular and sought court intervention to secure their inheritance rights and prevent transfer of assets while the dispute is adjudicated.

== Off-screen work ==
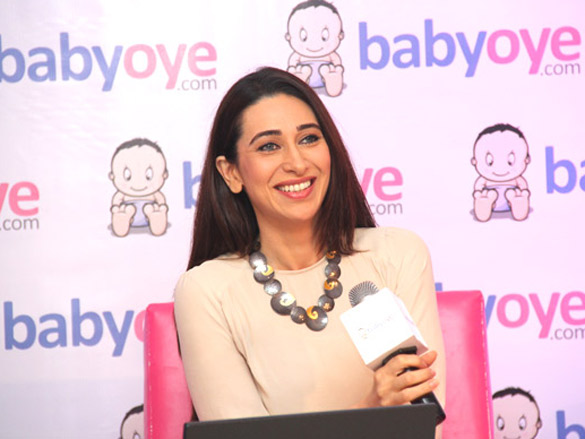
Kapoor at an event for Babyoye in 2012, in which she is a shareholder.

Kapoor supports her close friend Salman Khan's charitable trust Being Human Foundation, for which she walked ramp during "The Couture for a Cause - The Being Human Show" in 2010. In 2005, along with other Bollywood stars, Kapoor performed at the HELP! Telethon Concert, raising money for the victims of the 2004 Indian Ocean earthquake. In 2010, Kapoor, along with Salman Khan and several other Bollywood actresses walked at the HDIL India Couture Week, for a charity cause. Kapoor was a goodwill ambassador for Pinkathon 2012 for breast cancer awareness. Later in 2013, Kapoor participated in a campaign with Priyanka Chopra to highlight the rights of girls in India.

Kapoor has been part of several stage shows and world tours since the '90s. The Heartthrobs: Live in Concert was performed across the United States and Canada alongside Arjun Rampal, Hrithik Roshan, Kareena Kapoor and Aftab Shivdasani. In 2016, she participated in the Hiru Golden Film Awards in Sri Lanka as a special guest along with several other Bollywood actors, including Neil Nitin Mukesh, Suniel Shetty (Sunil Shetty), Jackie Shroff, Sridevi, and Madhuri Dixit. In addition to acting and philanthropy, Kapoor has been a celebrity endorser for several brands, including Kellogg's, Crescent Lawn, Admix Retail, Danone and Garnier Colour. Kapoor has also walked the runway for such designers as Manish Malhotra, Arpita Mehta, and Vikram Phadnis.

Kapoor is a shareholder in the children's product company Babyoye.com, an ecommerce startup specialising in selling infant- and mother-care products. In 2013, she wrote a book "My Yummy Mummy Guide: From Getting Pregnant to losing all the weight and beyond", a guide to motherhood filled with post pregnancy tips for women.

== Reception and public image ==
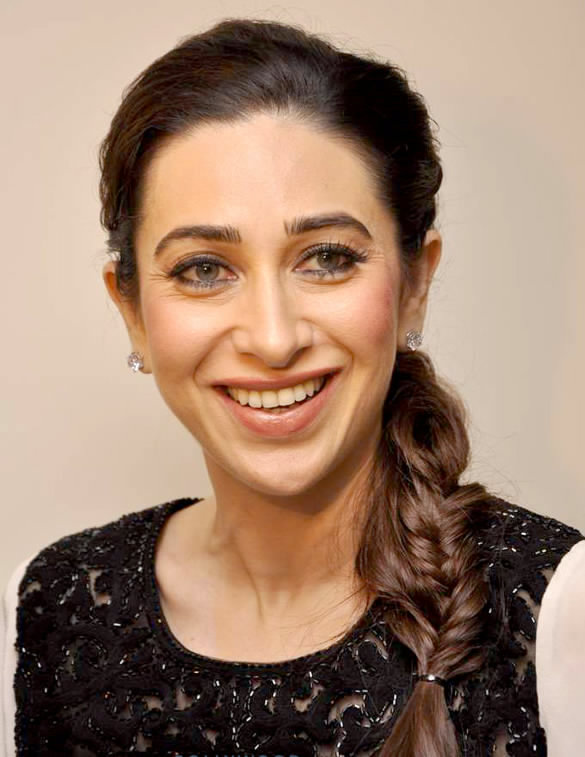
Kapoor's blue-green eyes have earned significant media attention.

Kapoor is considered as one of the most popular actresses of Indian cinema. She is also considered among India's most beautiful actresses. In 2012, Kapoor appeared on Forbes India's "Celebrity 100" list, peaking at the 77th position, with an estimated annual earning of ₹110.55 million (US$1.2 million). As of 2016, eight of her films have grossed more than ₹1 billion (US$11 million). One of the highest paid actress of the 1990s and early 2000s, Kapoor appeared on Box Office India's "Top Actresses" list for five years (1996-2000) and ranked first thrice (1996, 1997 and 1999). She was placed 8th in its "All Time Top Actresses" list and she topped its top actresses list from 1990–1999.

Deven Sharma of Filmfare termed Kapoor "a force to reckon with commercially", and noted, "Karisma Kapoor was a strong contender to both Madhuri Dixit and Sridevi’s domination to the ’90s." She has been described by The Tribune as "possessing exuberance and energy". The Times of India termed her "inimitable" due to her body of work and the essence that she brought into movies in the 90s. Nikita Sawant of Femina feels Kapoor embodies the statement, "Some people get better with age". Rediff.com said that Kapoor did everything from "raunchy numbers" to "serious roles". It credited her serious roles as the factor that consolidated her position as an "established actress". In an interview, Kapoor said,

"I have never really used any strategy. I go by my instinct. I do whatever I feel I should do. I have never planned or manipulated anything in my career. Whatever has happened has taken a natural course. I just felt that I liked these stories and I wanted to be a part of it."

Kapoor's sister Kareena Kapoor admits, "Working with Lolo will be a dream come true. She was and will always be my favorite actress." According to Rediff.com, she became "choosy about her roles" post a slew of out-and-out commercial films. NDTV termed her "The OG Bollywood Queen". Filmfare terms her as one of the "most celebrated stars" in the Hindi film industry. The Hindu said that she is blessed with "a radiant look and an enviable figure". Kapoor is widely praised for her performance in Raja Hindustani, Dil To Pagal Hai, Biwi No.1, Fiza, Zubeidaa and Shakti: The Power. Eastern Eye noted that Kapoor's filmography is filled with "an array of successful films". In 2022 and 2023, Kapoor was voted "Sexiest Actress Alive" by the Glamour Magazine. She was placed 4th in The Times of India's "50 Beautiful Faces" list. Kapoor's hand-print was unveiled at the Walk of the Stars at Bandra Bandstand. She is also known for her significant fashion and style statements throughout the 90s. In 2002, she received the Smita Patil Memorial Award for Best Actress, for her contribution to Indian cinema. In 2023, Kapoor received the Indian Achievers Award for Power Corridors by the Government of India. Kapoor ranks among the highest-grossing actresses in Indian cinema.

== Accolades ==
Kapoor is the recipient of a National Film Award for Best Supporting Actress for Dil To Pagal Hai (1997), and four Filmfare Awards out of eight nominations: Best Actress for Raja Hindustani (1996) and Fiza (2000), Best Supporting Actress for Dil To Pagal Hai (1997), and Best Actress (Critics) for Zubeidaa (2001).
