= Banarasi Babu (1997 film) =

- Poster
- Directed by: David Dhawan
- Screenplay by: Rumi Jaffery
- Story by: Nandu G. Tolani
- Produced by: Nandu Tolani
- Starring: Govinda; Ramya
- Cinematography: K. S. Prakash Rao
- Edited by: A. Muthu
- Music by: Songs: Anand–Milind; Score: Amar Haldipur
- Release date: 8 May 1997
- Running time: 126 minutes
- Country: India
- Language: Hindi

Banarasi Babu (lit. 'The Gentleman from Banaras') is a 1997 Indian Hindi-language comedy film directed by David Dhawan. The film stars Govinda, Ramya, Shakti Kapoor, Kader Khan, Bindu. The film was inspired by William Shakespeare's The Taming of the Shrew and the 1972 Tamil film Pattikada Pattanama.

== Plot ==
Gopi (Govinda) is a simple man from Banaras. He marries a returning emigrant, Madhu (Ramya). He is the family-oriented and loyal. She is a daredevil, happy-go-lucky type. He represents the Indian values. She does not mind taking a dive in the village pond in a bikini. One day it's her birthday party and she starts drinking and dancing. Gopi feels ashamed about his wife being like that. He is angered and slaps her. He recognises his error, but she runs away. She wants to live abroad. He wants to stay with his mother in his village. She walks out on him. Mother wants the daughter-in-law back. He decides to get the bride back, but after teaching her a lesson. He goes to Singapore and other foreign locales to hunt for his runaway bride. They occasionally encounter each other. He makes her pregnant and prevents the doctor from aborting the child. She delivers a baby boy. In the meanwhile, he becomes rich and famous. He leaves with the 15-days-old kid and returns to his village and threatens to remarry. The stage is set for his remarriage, but she reappears and wants the child back. He says if she cannot live without her 15-days-old child, then why did she want to separate his mother from her child? She realises her mistake.

== Cast ==
- Govinda as Gopi/Banarasi/Ghost/ghostman/bhootman
- Ramya as Madhubala Chaubey "Madhu"
- Shakti Kapoor as Manchala
- Kader Khan as Chaubey
- Bindu as Lily Chaubey
- Reema as Gopi's Mother
- Sanam as Radha
- Shagufta Ali as Manorama
- Upasana Singh as Sheela
- Aasif Sheikh as Vikram “Vicky”

== Soundtrack ==
Anand–Milind and Sameer teamed up with producer Nandu Tolani, actor Govinda and director David Dhawan.

Song	Singer
"Paan Ka Ek Beeda"	Vinod Rathod
"Mano Meri Baat"	Vinod Rathod
"Gajab Kar Dala"	Vinod Rathod
"Banaras Ka Bhaiya"	Vinod Rathod
"Saas Meri Badi Nakhrewali"	Vinod Rathod
"Sasuri Garam Garam"	Vinod Rathod, Poornima
"San Sananana Saai Saai Ho Rahi Thi"	Abhijeet; Poornima
"Meri Gori Gori Baahen Baahon Mein Aa Jaana"	Alka Yagnik; Kumar Sanu
