= Megha (1996 film) =

- Directed by: Mohanji Prasad
- Written by: Mohanji Prasad (story); Achala Nager (screenplay)
- Produced by: B. K. Jaiswal; Mohanji Prasad
- Starring: Shammi Kapoor; Karishma Kapoor; Rahul Roy
- Cinematography: Pratap Sinha
- Edited by: B. S. Glaad
- Music by: Raamlaxman
- Release date: 29 March 1996
- Running time: 200 minutes
- Country: India
- Language: Hindi
- Budget: ₹80 lakh
- Box office: ₹61,85 lakh

Megha is a 1996 Hindi film directed by Mohanji Prasad, starring Shammi Kapoor, Karishma Kapoor and Rahul Roy in the lead roles. Supporting casts include Mohnish Bahl, Pankaj Dheer, Saeed Jaffrey, Ronit Roy, Rakesh Bedi, Aparajita, Satyendra Kapoor, Dinesh Hingoo, Rajendranath, Paintal, Tiku Talsania. The film was a box office failure.

== Plot ==
Pretty collegian Megha has three admirers. The first one is Akash, who is in love with her and will do anything for her; Vinod, who is also in love with her, and wants to possess and marry her at any cost; and finally Prakash who admires her secretly, and will do anything to please and protect her. While Prakash lives alone, Akash is the son of a wealthy industrialist, Bhanupratap, who will not let his son marry someone from a middle-class family; while Vinod is wealthy beyond imagination, and quite capable of using this wealth to obtain anything or anyone he chooses. Megha has to decide who she wants to spend her life with.

== Cast ==
- Shammi Kapoor as Bhanupratap
- Karishma Kapoor as Megha
- Rahul Roy as Akash
- Mohnish Behl as Vinod
- Ronit Roy as Prakash
- Pankaj Dheer as Shankar
- Saeed Jaffrey as Jaikishan
- Padma Khanna as Warden Sonia Rustomji
- Rakesh Bedi as Kaushik Rathod, College Student
- Paintal as Suraj Bhopali
- Aparajita as Mrs. Bhanupratap
- Satyendra Kapoor as Ram Pawar, College Principal
- Rajendranath as Professor Dayaluram
- Dinesh Hingoo as Professor Hingorani
- Tiku Talsania as Professor Kalidas
- Vikas Anand as Megha's uncle

== Production ==
The film was shot on a 35 mm movie film. This film has Karishma Kapoor starring along with her grand uncle, Shammi Kapoor. Rahul Roy and Karishma Kapoor previously costarred in Sapne Sajan Ke (1992).

== Music ==
The music was composed by Raamlaxman.

#	Song	Singer
1.	"Baja Ke Bansi"	Lata Mangeshkar, Nitin Mukesh
2.	"Dilbar Jab Tak Na Mile"	Kumar Sanu, Kavita Krishnamurthy
3.	"Mohabbat Zindabad"	Kavita Krishnamurthy
4.	"Kuch Log Jeeti Baazi"	Lata Mangeshkar
5.	"Suna Hai Jijaji"	Asha Bhosle
6.	"Banke Chudiwala"	Surinder Kohli
7.	"Button Daba Denge"	Kumar Sanu, Poornima
