= Dulaara (1994 film) =

- Poster
- Directed by: Vimal Kumar
- Written by: Satish Jain
- Produced by: Vimal Kumar
- Starring: Govinda; Karisma Kapoor
- Cinematography: Anil Dhanda
- Edited by: Prakash Dave
- Music by: Nikhil-Vinay
- Production company: Shivam Chitrya
- Release date: 28 January 1994 (India)
- Country: India
- Language: Hindi
- Budget: ₹1.80 crore
- Box office: ₹6.60 crore

Dulaara (transl. Darling) is a 1994 Indian Hindi-language mystery thriller film directed by Vimal Kumar starring Govinda and Karisma Kapoor.

== Plot ==
Raja (Govinda) is the adopted son of Florence (Farida Jalal). James was a target killer who was killed in an encounter with the police and died in front of Florence. After James' funeral, Florence found a new born baby lying, she takes him with her and makes him her son. This toddler is Raja. At college Raja has Morarilal (Rakesh Bedi), Deepak (Satyajeet) and Gulshan, aka Gullu, (Gulshan Grover) as friends. Priya (Karishma Kapoor), the sister of Inspector Vijay Chauhan (Ranjeet), joins the college. After a series of tiffs with Raja, Priya begins to fall for him.

In the meanwhile, various college girls get killed by a mysterious killer. Inspector Chauhan is given charge of these cases. During a Christmas party, Raja goes with her mother to meet Priya, suddenly Deepak's sister, Ranjana, dies falling from the building. Gullu, who was in love with Ranjana, confirms that he saw her meeting with Professor Verma. Meanwhile, Professor Verma is seen furious and tries to call the police station. At the same time, someone tries to attack him with a knife, but Verma snatches the knife and runs. Suddenly, while running, Raja finds him in front and accidentally stabs him with that knife which Verma was holding. Raja runs from there and hides out.

Next day, everyone is shocked by Verma's murder. Inspector Chauhan starts taking fingerprints of everybody in the college. Raja, terrified of his crime and the fact that he turned out just like his father, gives unclear fingerprints. Gullu makes him realize that by doing this, he has actually incriminated himself. On that day was Priya's birthday party, where Raja and his friends were invited. Priya's nephew (and Chauhan's son) pointed out Raja as the murderer of Verma. Soon, Inspector Vijay Chauhan realises that his son was the main eyewitness of Verma's murder; Vijay Chauhan's son saw it through the window. When Raja learns that the murder was committed in front of Priya's home and that Priya's nephew (and Chauhan's son) Sunny has suddenly become silent since the day of the murder, he realizes that Sunny has seen him. Next day someone tries to murder Sunny, but soon Vijay comes and the killer runs away. Inspector Vijay confirms it to be Raja and provides security guards to his house.

On the other hand, Inspector Chauhan finds out why the girls were murdered on the basis of a sex scandal. Raja is immediately branded as a blue film maker. To make matters worse, Raja runs away to another place with his mother not knowing the fact. On the other hand, Inspector Chauhan frees Watchman Badruddin, who turns out to work for Monica, a blue film maker working for the unknown killer.

Chauhan eventually arrests Raja and interrogates him. Raja tells the truth, but is shocked to learn that the Professor was stabbed 20 times. He realizes that the Professor was killed by someone else and is still on the loose, tying up all leads. Realizing that Sunny is in danger, he escapes from the police station and kidnaps Sunny from the hospital. When Raja asks him why he told a lie, Sunny says he did not. Just then, the real killer comes to kill Sunny. Raja is shocked to see that the killer is Deepak.

Deepak says that he and his aide Monica were involved in blue film making. The victims were killed because they were threatening to expose Deepak. When Verma was stabbed by Raja, Deepak saw an opportunity to eliminate him and make his side safe. Then he saw Sunny and knew that he had another problem. Deepak killed every person who knew his secret, and incriminating Raja was his only option. The reason Sunny pointed to Raja as the killer was that Deepak was standing behind him!

Deepak tries to kill Sunny, but Raja fights him on the hospital roof. Deepak is thereafter arrested with Sunny as the eyewitness. Chauhan lets Raja go, telling him that his mother is in hospital in a critical state. Raja succeeds in saving his mother and the statement of Inspector Chauhan proves his innocence.

== Cast ==
- Govinda as Rajshekhar; Raja
- Karishma Kapoor as Priya Chauhan
- Ranjeet as Inspector Vijay Chauhan
- Farida Jalal as Florence Joyner
- Satyajeet as Deepak
- Rakesh Bedi as Morarilal
- Avtar Gill as College Principal Pratap Thakkar
- Gulshan Grover as Gulshan aka Gullu
- Javed Khan as Watchman Badruddin
- Tej Sapru as Professor Akash Verma
- Dalip Tahil as James Joyner
- Vikas Anand as Police Commissioner Mohandas Kapoor
- Aparajita Bhushan as Mrs. Vijay Chauhan
- Rajesh Puri as Bhikaridas (Bhiku) College student whose hands are tied with Handcuffs
- Yunus Parvez as Saxena, Bhikaridas Father
- Guddi Maruti as a College friend of Priya
- Ghanshyam Rohera as Police constable Ghanshyam
- Amrit Patel as Police Constable Khan
- Brahm Bhardwaj as Guest at Priya's birthday party
- Master Rafi as Sunny Chauhan, Vijay's son

== Soundtrack ==
Dulaara

Soundtrack album by Nikhil–Vinay
- Genre: Feature film soundtrack
- Label: Tips Music

Music by Nikhil-Vinay and lyrics were written by Rani Malik and Yogesh Gaur. The song "Mera Pant Bhi Sexy" was well received.

#	Title	Singer(s)
1	"Mera Pant Bhi Sexy"	Govinda, Alka Yagnik
2	"Silsila Shuru Hua Pyar Ka"	Udit Narayan, Alka Yagnik
3	"Tumhi Se Tumhi Ko Chura"	Kumar Sanu, Alka Yagnik
4	"Dil Mein Duaen Hain"	Sadhana Sargam
5	"Sajan Re Sajan Kahta"	Kumar Sanu, Alka Yagnik
6	"Kal Kahin College Mein Mera"	Udit Narayan, Alka Yagnik
7	"Bale Bale Nazren Tu"	Udit Narayan
8	"Dil Yahin Kahin Kho Gaya"	Kumar Sanu, Alka Yagnik
