= Smita Patil Memorial Award for Best Actress =

Smita Patil Memorial Award
- Awarded for: Smita Patil Memorial Award
- Sponsored by: Priyadarshni Academy
- First award: 1986
- Website: Official website

The Smita Patil Memorial Award for Best Actress was established in 1986 by the Priyadarshni Academy in memory of actress Smita Patil. It is awarded every other year to an Indian actress for her contribution to Indian cinema since the last award ceremony, irrespective of a particular performance.

== Recipients ==
Year	Image	Honoree	Ref.
1987		Tanvi Azmi	
1988		Deepika Chikhlia	
1989		Roopa Ganguly	
1990		Sridevi	
1991		Dimple Kapadia	
1992		Pooja Bhatt	
1993		Meenakshi Sheshadri	
1994		Manisha Koirala	
1996		Madhuri Dixit	
1998		Tabu	
2000		Aishwarya Rai	
2002		Karisma Kapoor	
2004		Urmila Matondkar	
2006		Kareena Kapoor	
2008		Preity Zinta	
2010		Vidya Balan	
2012		Deepika Padukone	
2014		Priyanka Chopra	
2016		Katrina Kaif	
2018		Anushka Sharma	
2020		Taapsee Pannu	-
2021		Kiara Advani	
2022		Alia Bhatt	

== Controversy ==
The choice of Katrina Kaif, who is not renowned for her acting abilities, for the award in 2016 met with wide criticism by both the press and the public on social networks. Columnist Sneha Bengani described her selection as "a grave insult to Patil" and further wrote that it "mocks all the previous recipients". Others defended the choice.
