= Jawab (1995 film) =

- Promotional Poster
- Directed by: Ajay Kashyap
- Starring: Raaj Kumar; Harish Kumar; Karishma Kapoor
- Music by: Anu Malik
- Release date: 27 January 1995
- Country: India
- Language: Hindi
- Budget: ₹ 1.50 crore
- Box office: ₹ 3.18 crore

Jawab is a 1995 Indian Hindi-language action film directed by Ajay Kashyap, starring Raaj Kumar, Harish Kumar and Karisma Kapoor, with a supporting cast of Prem Chopra, Mukesh Khanna, Annu Kapoor and Farida Jalal.

== Plot ==
Rajeshwar is a kind-hearted industrialist leading widowed and childless life. Ashwini Saxena is Union Leader of the factory owned by Rajeshwar. Shobhraj is and orphan and Rajeshwar's unscrupulous brother-in-law responsible for the death of his wife, who is Rajeshwar's elder sister. Shobhraj sends his goons to attack Rajeshwar to avenge his insult, which is thwarted by Ashwini's interference. Ashwini's wife Parvati is expecting their second child, Suman. The friendship between Ashwini and Rajeshwar leads the former to sacrifice her infant daughter, Suman to the latter. Suman grows up as Rajeshwar's daughter.

18 Years later, Suman is studying in the same college as Ravi, who is revealed in flashback, to be Ashwini's adopted son, owing to a fire tragedy claiming the lives of his wife Parvati and his only son. Heartbroken Ashwini decides to leave the city. In the present day, Ravi and Suman fall in love after initial altercations, and wish to get married. Suman sends Ravi to meet her father, Rajeshwar, who asks him to send his father for guardian-level talks. It is then revealed that Ashwini after leaving the city had adopted Ravi, an orphan, and raised him as his own son. The bad experience of trusting an orphan, with brother-in-law Shobhraj, leads Rajeshwar to deny and reject the marriage proposal of Ravi for his daughter Suman, citing status differences. Dejected Ashwini leaves the bungalow with a determination to rise above his economic status and become a wealthy man to equate himself with Rajeshwar. Ashwini approaches a Bank for business loan, which is rejected by the Bank Manager citing financial security restrictions. After coming out of the bank, Ashwini realizes that the same bank is getting robbed. With some valiant effort, Ashwini is able to nab the entire gang and hand them over to the local police station. The robbers' gang turns out to have a hefty reward on their capture, which is then given to Ashwini as a felicitation. Ashwini ventures into business and establishes various organizations into diversified sectors, thereby conflicting and locking horns with Rajeshwar. In order to facilitate his prospects, Rajeshwar has to borrow money from various lenders. Shobhraj reappears as a saviour offering cash financial help to save Rajeshwar his prestige and goodwill in the market. In lieu of the cash help, Shobhraj gets a piece of land as a collateral.

Eventually Ashwini manages to expose Shobhraj and burn the signed papers for the land as a collateral. Meanwhile, Suman learns from Aapa about her originality and her relation with Ashwini Kumar. An exchange of emotional outbursts leads both the patriarchs to shake hands, embrace each other and agree to the wedding of their children Ravi and Suman.

== Cast ==
- Raaj Kumar as Ashwini Kumar Saxena
- Harish Kumar as Ravi A. Saxena
- Karishma Kapoor as Suman
- Mukesh Khanna as Rajeshwar
- Farida Jalal as Rajeshwar's Domestic Helper
- Prem Chopra as Shobhraj
- Kishore Bhanushali as Johnny
- Sharad Sankla as Charlie Chaplin
- Tiku Talsania as Scientist Dr.Inder Kumar
- Rohini Hattangadi as Mrs. Lucy Inder Kumar
- Deven Bhojani as Popatlal, Lucy's Nephew
- Sudhir as Security Guard
- Rana Jung Bahadur as Suman's neighbor Lalwani
- Raj Kishore as Police Inspector
- Annu Kapoor as Laadle
- Maya Alagh as Parvati Saxena (Guest Appearance)
- Nayana Apte Joshi as Late Mrs. Rajeshwar seen only in Photo-frame
- Yunus Parvez as Minister
- Bob Christo as Goon attacking Rajeshwar
- Mahesh Anand as Bank Robber Gang Leader
- Dinyar Contractor as College Principal

== Soundtrack ==
#	Title	Singer(s)	Lyricist
1	"Dil Churaya Neend Churayee"	Udit Narayan, Kavita Krishnamurthy	Hasrat Jaipuri
2	"Ek Tak Ant Thak"	Abhijeet, Poornima	Indeewar
3	"Kal Hum Jahan Mile The"	Kumar Sanu, Sadhana Sargam	Gulshan Bawra
4	"Duniya Se Masoom"	Vinod Rathod	Hasrat Jaipuri
5	"Ye Dil Mein Rahanewale"	Bela Sulakhe	B. B. Laal
6	"Tum Pe Dil Aa Gaya"	Kumar Sanu, Sadhana Sargam	Hasrat Jaipuri
7	"Ye Dil Mein Rahanewale"	Kumar Sanu	B. B. Laal
8	"Ye Dil Mein Rahanewale"	Sadhana Sargam	B. B. Laal
9	"Ye Dil Mein Rahanewale"	Mohammad Aziz	B. B. Laal
