= India's Best Dancer (Hindi TV series) season 4 =

India's Best Dancer
- Season 4
- Hosted by: Jay Bhanushali; Aniket Chauhan
- Judges: Geeta Kapoor; Terence Lewis; Karishma Kapoor
- No. of contestants: 14
- Winner: Steve Jyrwa
- Winning mentor: Raktim Thakuria
- Runner-up: Nextion
- No. of episodes: 36

Release
- Original network: Sony Entertainment Television
- Original release: 13 July – 10 November 2024

Season chronology
- ← Previous; Season 3

India's Best Dancer 4, also known as India's Best Dancer: Jab Dil Kare Dance Kar, is the fourth season of the popular Indian reality TV series, India's Best Dancer. It premiered on 13 July 2024 on Sony Entertainment Television. The show is hosted by Jay Bhanushali and Aniket Chauhan, with Geeta Kapoor, Terence Lewis, and Karisma Kapoor serving as the judges. Karisma Kapoor joined the judging panel this season, replacing Sonali Bendre, who was a judge in the previous season.

== Top 12 contestants ==
Contestant	Choreographer	Dance form	From	Status
Steve Jyrwa	Raktim Thakuria	Hip-Hop	Meghalaya	Winner; 10 November 2024
Smruti Swarup Patra (Nextion)	Vipul Kandpal	Freestyle	Odisha	Runner-up; 10 November 2024
Harsh Keshri	Pratik Utekar	Contemporary	Bihar	Third place 10 November 2024
Deepak Shahi (Nepo)	Vartika Jha	Hip-Hop	Uttarakhand	4th position
Akansha Mishra (Akina)	Subranil Paul	Lyrical	Maharashtra	5th position
Aditya Malviya	Vaibhav Ghuge	Contortion	Bhopal	6th Position
Ishani Nag	Sadhwi Majumdar	Classical	Kolkata	Eliminated; 3 November 2024
Arjun Sathe	Pankaj Thapa	Freestyle	Mumbai	Eliminated; 13 October 2024
Vaishnavi Shekhawat	Shivanshu Soni (Bharat Ghare till Week 2)	Contemporary	Bengaluru	Eliminated; 13 October 2024
Rohan Choudhary	Akash Thapa	Freestyle	Assam	Withdrew; 6 October 2024
Nikhil Patnayak	Ashutosh Pawar	Contemporary	Chhattisgarh	Withdrew; 29 September 2024
Amos Mathi	Kartik Raja	Hip Hop	Mumbai	Eliminated; 1 September 2024
Chitrakshi Batra	Saumya Kamble; Vartika for Week 3	Belly Dance	Punjab	Eliminated; 1 September 2024
Dibyajyoti Naik	Rupesh Soni	Popping	Odisha	Withdrew; 18 August 2024, Eliminated; 3 November 2024

== Scoring chart ==
Colour key:

Winners
Runners-up
Third place
Bottom two
Eliminated
Withdrew from competition

India's Best Dancer (season 4) - Weekly Scores
Dance Duo Contestant and Choreographer	Place	Week																	
Dance Duo Contestant and Choreographer	Place	1	2	3	1+2+3	4	5	4+5	6	7	8 (Note: This week was team based, with 2 guest judges, Dharmesh & Punit. Scores were given out of 40, with the team captain (Dharmesh or Punit), not giving scores to their team members.)		9	10 (Note: The choreographers were swapped this week, they are listed as follows: Ishani and Shivanshu; Vaishnavi and Pratik; Arjun and Subhranil; Steve and Vartika; Nepo and Raktim; Akina and Vipul; Nextion and Pankaj; Harsh and Akash)	11	6+8+9+10+11	12		
Dance Duo Contestant and Choreographer	Place	1	2	3	1+2+3	4	5	4+5	6	7	8		9	10	11	6+8+9+10+11	Night 1	Night 2	1+2
Akina and Subranil		30 (10, 10, 10)	30 (10, 10, 10)	30 (10, 10, 10)	90		30 (10, 10, 10)		29 (9, 10, 9)	No scores given	33 (8, 8, 9, 8)	P	30+10=40 (10,10,10)	28+10=38 (9, 9, 10)	25+30=55 (8, 9, 8)	195	30 (10, 10, 10)	30 (10,10,10)	
Harsh and Pratik		24 (7, 9, 8)	30 (10, 10, 10)	28 (9, 10, 9)	82		30 (10, 10, 10)		30 (10, 10, 10)	No scores given	39+10=49 (9, 10, 10, 10)	D	26+10=36 (8, 9, 9)	30+10=40 (10,10,10)	28+26=54 (8, 10, 10)	209	27 (9, 9, 9)		
Nextion and Vipul		30 (10,10,10)	30 (10, 10, 10)	30 (10, 10, 10)	90		28 (9, 10, 9)	51	28+10=38 (9, 10, 9)	No scores given	40 (10, 10, 10, 10)	P	30+10=40 (10,10,10)	29 (10, 10, 9)	27+30=57 (8, 10, 9)	204	30 (10, 10, 10)		
Nepo and Vartika		27 (9, 9, 9)	30 (10, 10, 10)	30 (10, 10, 10)	87	30 (10, 10, 10)	30 (10, 10, 10)	60	25+10=35 (10, 10, 5) (Note: The special guests for the day, Chunky Pandey and Neelam pressed the 10 score buzzer for Geeta and Karishma respectively, so Terence gave 5 points to balance it out.)	No scores given	40 (10, 10, 10, 10)	D	30 (10,10,10)	25 (8, 9, 8)	26+30=56 (8, 9, 9)	186	25 (8, 9, 8)	30 (10,10,10)	
Steve and Raktim		30 (10, 10, 10)	30 (10, 10, 10)	30 (10, 10, 10)	90	30 (10, 10, 10)	30 (10, 10, 10)	60	30 (10, 10, 10)	No scores given	40 (10, 10, 10, 10)	P	27 (9, 9, 9)	30+10=40 (10,10,10) (Note: It was announced that calculating past weeks public votes, Steve was the highest voted contestant.)	26+30=56 (9, 9, 8)	193	26 (9, 9, 8)		
Ishani and Sadhwi									27 (9, 9, 9)	No scores given	35 (9, 9, 9, 8)	D	30+10=40 (10,10,10)	29+10=39 (10, 10, 9)	25+30=55 (8, 9, 8)	196	26 (8, 9, 9)		
Vaishnavi and Shivanshu	7th	22 (7, 8, 7)	23 (7, 8, 8)	30 (10, 10, 10)	75		30 (10, 10, 10)		30 (10, 10, 10)	No scores given	40 (10, 10, 10, 10)	D	27 (9, 9, 9)	30 (10,10,10)	30+26=56 (10,10,10)	183			
Arjun and Pankaj	7th	29 (9, 10, 10)	24 (8, 8, 8)	30 (10, 10, 10)	83		29 (10, 10, 9)		30 (10, 10, 10)	No scores given	34 (8, 9, 9, 8)	D	0 (0, 0, 0)	30 (10,10,10)	28+30=58 (9, 9, 10)	152			
Rohan and Akash	9th	25 (8, 9, 8)	27 (9, 9, 9)	24 (8, 8, 8)	76		26 (8, 9, 9)		30 (10, 10, 10)	No scores given	40 (10, 10, 10, 10)	P	0 (0, 0, 0)	—					
Nikhil and Ashutosh	10th	26 (8, 9, 9)	27 (8, 10, 9)	22 (7, 8, 7)	75		30 (10, 10, 10)		0 (0, 0, 0)	No scores given	36+10=46 (9, 9, 9, 9)	P	—						
Amos and Kartik	11th	26 (8, 9, 9)	27 (9, 9, 9)	24 (8, 8, 8)	77		26 (9, 8, 9)	51											
Chitrakshi and Saumya	11th	30 (10, 10, 10)	24 (8, 8, 8)	26 (8, 9, 9)	80	30 (10,10,10)	22 (7, 8, 7)	52											
Dibyajyoti and Rupesh	13th	23 (7, 8, 8)	30 (10, 10, 10)	—															

=== Impromptu Battle (Immunity Power) ===
This battle was announced by Sajid Khan in the week 10, where the top scorers from the weeks 6, 8, 9 and 10 competed in this battle for the immunity power, which the winner of this battle could use in any week to be safe from the elimination. Prior to the battle, no rehearsals were allowed.

Contestant	Result
Nextion	Lost
Harsh	Won the immunity power
Ishani	Lost

=== Bonus Relay Round ===
This concept was started in Week 6, where a set of contestants whose performance aired that day, perform again in a relay round against others to get a bonus 10 score added to this week's total.

==== Week 6 ====
Contestant	Result
Nepo	Won (Bonus 10)
Nextion	Won (Bonus 10)
Arjun Sathe	Lost
Steve Jyrwa	Lost
Ishani Nag	Lost
Harsh Keshri	Lost
Vaishnavi Shekhawat	Lost
Akina	Lost
Rohan Choudhary	Lost

==== Week 8 ====
Contestant	Result
Harsh Keshri	Won (Bonus 10)
Nikhil Patnayak	Won (Bonus 10)
Arjun Sathe	Lost
Steve Jyrwa	Lost
Ishani Nag	Lost
Nepo	Lost
Vaishnavi Shekhawat	Lost
Akina	Lost
Rohan Choudhary	Lost
Nextion	Lost

==== Week 9 ====
Group 1
Contestant	Result
Ishani	Won (Bonus 10)
Vaishnavi	Lost
Akina	Won (Bonus 10)

Group 2
Contestant	Result
Steve	Lost
Harsh	Won (Bonus 10)

Group 3
Contestant	Result
Nextion	Won (Bonus 10)
Nepo	Lost

==== Week 10 ====
Group 1
Contestant	Result
Harsh	Won (Bonus 10)
Vaishnavi	Lost

Group 2
Contestant	Result
Nepo	Lost
Steve	Won (Bonus 10)

Group 3
Contestant	Result
Nextion	Lost
Ishani	Won (Bonus 10)

Group 3
Contestant	Result
Arjun	Lost
Akina	Won (Bonus 10)

=== Bonus 30 Round ===
This round was started in week 11, where wo contestants had to perform as a pair, and the judges' score the performance out of 30 and it gets added to the total scores of that week.

==== Week 11 ====
Contestant Pair	Scores
Arjun and Ishani	30 (10, 10, 10)
Akina and Nextion	30 (10, 10, 10)
Nepo and Steve	30 (10, 10, 10)
Harsh and Vaishnavi	26 (8, 9, 9)
