= Papi Gudia =

1996 Indian film by Lawrence D'Souza

- Poster
- Directed by: Lawrence D'Souza
- Written by: Talat Rekhi
- Produced by: Vinod Chhabra
- Starring: Avinash Wadhavan; Karishma Kapoor; Shakti Kapoor; Master Amar
- Cinematography: Lawrence D'Souza
- Edited by: A.R. Rajendran
- Music by: Naresh Sharma
- Distributed by: Aum Films India
- Release date: 16 February 1996
- Running time: 131 minutes
- Country: India
- Language: Hindi
- Budget: ₹70 lakh
- Box office: ₹76.36 lakh

Papi Gudia (transl. Sinful Doll) is a 1996 Indian Hindi-language horror film directed by Lawrence D'Souza, starring Karisma Kapoor, Avinash Wadhavan, Tinnu Anand, and Shakti Kapoor. The film is heavily inspired by the American film series Child's Play and served as an unofficial remake of the first Child's Play film (1988). It was declared "disaster" by Box Office India.

== Plot ==
A child murderer and black magic practitioner transfers his soul to a doll before death and wreaks havoc in the lives of the doll's new owners: a boy and his elder sister.

== Cast ==
- Karisma Kapoor as Karishma
- Master Amar Bhardwaj as Raju
- Avinash Wadhavan as Inspector Vijay Saxena
- Shakti Kapoor as Charandas "Channi"
- Tinnu Anand as Inspector Yadav
- Razzak Khan as Jaggu, Channi's henchman
- Mohan Joshi as Raghavan
- Subbiraj as Police Commissioner

== Soundtrack ==
#	Title	Singer(s)
1	"Music-I Love The Beat"	Alka Yagnik
2	"Rahte Hai Nashe Mein"	Poornima
3	"Aaj Sajke Niklee Hai"	Udit Narayan, Alka Yagnik
4	"Mujhe Tujh Se Kitna Pyar"	Kumar Sanu, Alka Yagnik
5	"Dekho Dekho Main Hoon Karishma"	Bali Brahmbhatt, Alisha Chinai
6	"Gudda Le Aaon Na"	Alka Yagnik
