= Prem Shakti =

1994 Hindi-language film

- प्रेम शक्ति
- Directed by: Shibu Mitra
- Produced by: Nasir Parkar
- Starring: Govinda; Karishma Kapoor
- Music by: Raamlaxman
- Release date: 25 February 1994
- Country: India
- Language: Hindi
- Budget: ₹1.40 crore
- Box office: ₹2.27 crore

Prem Shakti is a 1994 Hindi-language romantic fantasy directed by Shibu Mitra, starring Govinda, Karishma Kapoor in lead roles. Other cast includes Shakti Kapoor, Kader Khan, Raza Murad, Puneet Issar and Nitish Bharadwaj. It was previously titled as "Jab Jab Pyar Hua". The film had an average run, it marked the beginning of Karishma and Govinda as co-stars who went on to give many hit movies together.

== Plot ==
Ganga (Govinda) and Gauri (Karishma Kapoor) are in love, but the young lovers are not permitted to marry. One night they run away, finding themselves in the den of an evil sage (Puneet Issar), who is trying to coerce the Lord of the Snakes (Nitish Bharadwaj) into giving him a gem he needs to make the nectar which will give him immortality. This event can only happen on this one night of the full moon, which comes only once ever twenty-five years. But the young lovers defend the Snake and defeat the sage's plan. The angry sage turns Gauri to a stone and unable to withstand the shock, Ganga passes away. But the magical snake saves the day by proclaiming that Ganga will be reborn, still with love in his heart for Gauri, and twenty-five years later they will find each other again. How will fate play out to bring the lovers together? Who will win the supernatural battle that spans many years and several reincarnations?

== Cast ==
- Govinda as Ganga / Krishna
- Karishma Kapoor as Gauri / Karishma
- Shakti Kapoor as Hoshiyar Singh
- Kader Khan as Romeo
- Raza Murad as Mamaji
- Puneet Issar as Mahabali Tantrik
- Nitish Bharadwaj as Naagraj
- Sulabha Deshpande as Ganga's Mother
- Satyendra Kapoor as Gauri's Father
- Tiku Talsania as Mannequin Maker
- Sameer Khakhar as Kewelchand
- Viju Khote as Delpotiya

== Music ==
Song	Singer
"O Rama Ho" (Female)	Lata Mangeshkar
"Jab Talak Rahe Dharti Aasman Gayega Yeh Zamana"	Lata Mangeshkar, Udit Narayan
"Tumko Dekha Hai Aksar Khwab Mein, Woh Tum Hi Ho"	Lata Mangeshkar, Udit Narayan
"Dil Karta Hai Door Chale Kahin, Peechhe Reh Jaye Jahan"	Lata Mangeshkar, Udit Narayan
"Aa Baith Mere Ghode Par, Bol Tujhe Kahan Jana Hai"	Sadhana Sargam, Udit Narayan
"Aaja Re Tu Aaja Re"	Udit Narayan
"O Rama Ho" (Male)	Udit Narayan
