= Andaz (1994 film) =

- Poster
- Directed by: David Dhawan
- Written by: K. Bhagyaraj (original story); Anees Bazmee (screenplay & dialogue)
- Produced by: Pahlaj Nihalani
- Starring: Anil Kapoor; Juhi Chawla; Karishma Kapoor; Kader Khan
- Cinematography: Siba Mishra
- Edited by: Nand Kumar
- Music by: Bappi Lahiri, Amar Mohile
- Release date: 8 April 1994
- Country: India
- Language: Hindi

Andaz (transl. Style) is a 1994 Indian Hindi-language action comedy film directed by David Dhawan, starring Anil Kapoor, Juhi Chawla, Karishma Kapoor and Kader Khan. Other cast members include Raj Babbar, Shakti Kapoor, Satish Kaushik, Ishrat Ali, Mahesh Anand, Vikas Anand and Tej Sapru. It is a remake of Tamil film Sundara Kandam (1992), starring K. Bhagyaraj and Bhanupriya. The film was the 13th highest grossing Bollywood film of 1994.

== Plot ==
Ajay (Anil Kapoor), an intelligent alumnus of the S. T. School, is appointed in the same school as a teacher. Jaya (Karisma Kapoor), who studies in his class, harasses him by playing mischievous pranks. Ajay's refusal to enter into a romantic relationship with Jaya upsets her. She challenges him that she will one day become his wife. In a haste, he marries Saraswati (Juhi Chawla), an illiterate orphan girl. Jaya befriends Saraswati by teaching her everything from cooking to reading and writing. One day, some terrorists attack the school and take the students as hostages. Ajay & Jaya are also trapped. In this situation, Jaya is willing to give her life to save Ajay, and Saraswati reveals that she knows about Jaya's love for Ajay and asks Ajay to marry her on the spot by putting a mangalsutra around her neck. Jaya refuses saying that she will come back in their lives again, this time as Ajay's and Saraswati's daughter.

== Cast ==
- Anil Kapoor as Ajay Kumar Saxena
- Juhi Chawla as Saraswati Saxena
- Karisma Kapoor as Jaya
- Raj Babbar as Captain
- Mahesh Anand as Chote, terrorist
- Tej Sapru as Bhola, terrorist
- Govind Namdev as terrorist
- Vishwajeet Pradhan as terrorist
- Kader Khan as Principal
- Shakti Kapoor as Shagun
- Kunickaa Sadanand as Shobha Teacher
- Satish Kaushik as Panipuri Sharma
- Dina Pathak as Dadi in Photo Frame
- Himani Shivpuri as Panipuri's wife
- Ishrat Ali as an Indian Army Officer
- Vikas Anand as Army Officer and father of Jaya
- Harish Patel as Minister
- Subbiraj as Colonel Anand Viraj. (Uncredited Role) (Killed at beginning of Movie)
- Deven Bhojani as Ajay, Student
- Vinay Sapru as Govind, Student
- Javed Hyder as Chunky Pandey, Student

== Soundtrack ==
The music is scored by Bappi Lahiri, with lyrics by Indeevar and notable singers Kumar Sanu, Abhijeet Bhattacharya, Udit Narayan, Kavita Krishnamurthy, Alka Yagnik, Vinod Rathod, Sadhana Sargam and Sudesh Bhosle.

#	Song title	Singer
1	"Kuku Kuku"	Kumar Sanu, Alka Yagnik
2	"Laila Bechari Ka Karti"	Kumar Sanu, Alka Yagnik and Sudesh Bhosle
3	"Ye Maal Gaadi"	Kavita Krishnamurthy, Vinod Rathod
4	"Lelo Lelo Mera Imtihaan"	Kumar Sanu, Kavita Krishnamurthy
5	"Khada Hai"	Vinod Rathod, Sadhana Sargam
6	"Chal Re Gaa Mere Saath"	Abhijeet Bhattacharya & Udit Narayan
7	"Nacho Gaao Filmein Dikhao"	Alka Yagnik, Vinod Rathod
