= Dulhan Hum Le Jayenge =

2000 Indian film by David Dhawan

- Poster
- Directed by: David Dhawan
- Written by: Rumi Jaffery
- Produced by: Gordhan Tanwani
- Starring: Salman Khan; Karisma Kapoor
- Cinematography: Harmeet Singh
- Edited by: David Dhawan
- Music by: Songs: Himesh Reshammiya; Background Score: Surinder Sodhi
- Distributed by: Baba Arts
- Release date: 24 March 2000
- Running time: 140 minutes
- Country: India
- Language: Hindi
- Budget: ₹11 crore
- Box office: ₹36.47 crore

Dulhan Hum Le Jayenge (transl. I will take the bride) is a 2000 Indian Hindi-language romantic comedy film directed by David Dhawan, starring Salman Khan and Karisma Kapoor with Anupam Kher, Paresh Rawal, Kader Khan, Johnny Lever, and Om Puri in supporting roles. The film was one of the top-grossing commercially successful films of 2000.

== Plot ==
Sapna has been brought up by her three doting, but eccentric uncles. Prabhu is a very religious Hindu, while Bhola is a former wrestler who is very into fitness and makes Sapna do intense workout routines daily. Vicky is into fashion and western music. The uncles all wish for her to marry, but their differences clash, as each of them wants the boy to have the same interests as them. Sapna is tired of dancing to her uncle's tunes all her life and wishes to take a group trip to Europe. However, when she expresses her wishes to her nanny, Mary, her uncles fire the nanny for giving Sapna such foolish ideas. However, Mary works for another family and tells them of Sapna's plight. She shares Sapna's photo with Raja, who is now determined to make her his bride. Meanwhile, Sapna looks to the last resort and tries to run away, but Vicky catches her and volunteers to take her to the airport himself. On her travels through Europe, Raja creates nothing but trouble for her, but circumstances separate them from the rest of the tour group, and Raja saves Sapna's life. They fall in love and wish to marry once they return to India, but Raja must first impress all three of her uncles. Through a series of comic events, Raja wins their hearts. He and Sapna happily marry in the end.

The story is loosely based on the old Sunil Dutt/Waheeda Rehman movie Ek Phool Char Kante

== Cast ==
- Salman Khan as Raja Oberoi: Sapna's love-interest
- Karisma Kapoor as Sapna
- Kader Khan as Mr. Oberoi
- Satish Kaushik as Laughing Police Inspector Abhay
- Johnny Lever as Tour Manager Chirkund / Chirkunda
- Om Puri as Bhola Nath
- Paresh Rawal as Prabhu Nath
- Anupam Kher as Vicky Nath
- Deepak Tijori as Smuggler Daaga
- Kashmera Shah as Lovely
- Farida Jalal as Mrs. Oberoi
- Himani Shivpuri as Mary
- Dara Singh as Sapna's grandfather
- Rakesh Bedi as Secretary / Photographer Kaushik
- Usha Bachani as Anita, Smuggler's girlfriend
- Mayur Verma as Rahul (Raja's Friend)

== Soundtrack ==
Dulhan Hum Le Jayenge

Soundtrack album by Himesh Reshammiya
- Released: 15 January 2000
- Recorded: 1999–2000
- Venue: Mumbai
- Genre: Feature film soundtrack
- Length: 40:52
- Label: Tips
- Producer: Himesh Reshammiya

Himesh Reshammiya chronology
Hello Brother (1999)	Dulhan Hum Le Jayenge (2000)	Kurukshetra (2000)

Professional ratings
Review scores
Source	Rating
Planet Bollywood	7/10 stars

The music for Dulhan Hum Le Jayenge was composed by Himesh Reshammiya (in his first full-length Bollywood album) with lyrics written by Sudhakar Sharma. It was released on Tips Music. According to the Indian trade website Box Office India, with around 1.8 milliom units sold, this film's soundtrack album was the year's eighth highest-selling.

#	Song	Singer(s)
1.	"Pyar Dilon Ka Mela Hai"	Alka Yagnik, Sonu Nigam
2.	"Chamiya"	Alka Yagnik, Sonu Nigam
3.	"Mujhse Shaadi Karogi"	Kumar Sanu, Alka Yagnik, Suresh Wadkar and Shankar Mahadevan
4.	"Tera Pallu Sarka Jaaye Re"	Sonu Nigam, Alka Yagnik
5.	"Dheere Dheere Chalna"	Alka Yagnik, Sonu Nigam
6.	"O Mr. Raja"	Alka Yagnik, Sonu Nigam
7.	"Dulhan Hum Le Jayenge"	Kumar Sanu, Alka Yagnik and Sunita Rao
8.	"Hai Na Bolo"	Alka Yagnik, Kumar Sanu

== Reception ==
K. N. Vijiyan of New Straits Times wrote that "The comedy and foreign locales save the film". Aparajita Saha of Rediff.com wrote, "Director David Dhawan definitely knows what will work and what won't. He's all for commercial cinema and proud of it too! All in all, Dulhan Hum Le Jayenge is worth a watch. Here's a movie that will take some of the attention away from Kaho Naa... Pyaar Hai".
