= Biwi No.1 =

1999 Indian film by David Dhawan

- Poster
- Directed by: David Dhawan
- Written by: Crazy Mohan
- Story by: Balu Mahendra Ananthu
- Based on: Sathi Leelavathi by Balu Mahendra
- Produced by: Vashu Bhagnani
- Starring: Anil Kapoor; Salman Khan; Karisma Kapoor; Tabu; Sushmita Sen
- Cinematography: K. S. Prakash Rao
- Edited by: A. Muthu; Tarun Kripalani
- Music by: Anu Malik
- Production company: Pooja Entertainment
- Distributed by: Tips Industries
- Release date: 28 May 1999
- Running time: 140 minutes
- Country: India
- Language: Hindi
- Budget: ₹12 crore
- Box office: ₹49.81 crore

Biwi No.1 (transl. Wife No. 1) is a 1999 Indian Hindi-language comedy film directed by David Dhawan, being a remake of the 1995 Tamil film Sathi Leelavathi. It stars Anil Kapoor, Salman Khan, Karisma Kapoor, Tabu, and Sushmita Sen in lead roles, with Amitabh Bachchan and Saif Ali Khan in special appearances.

Biwi No.1 opened to positive reviews from critics upon release, with praise for its screenplay, humor, and performances of the cast, particularly for Karisma Kapoor and Sen's performances, emerging as a breakthrough for the latter.

Biwi No. 1 proved to be a major commercial success at the box office, grossing ₹52.80 crore worldwide, ranking as the fourth highest-grossing Hindi film of the year.

At the 45th Filmfare Awards, Biwi No.1 received 7 nominations, including Best Film, Best Director (Dhawan) and Best Actress (Karisma Kapoor), with Sen winning Best Supporting Actress.

== Plot ==
Prem Mehra is married to the devoted and traditional Pooja Khanna, and the couple has two children. Prem, a successful advertising executive, meets aspiring model Rupali Walia during a modeling interview at his office. The two begin an extramarital affair, leading Prem to leave his wife and children to live with Rupali.

Upon discovering the affair, Pooja, with the support of Prem's friend Lakhan, undergoes a transformation—adopting a modern lifestyle and pursuing a career in modeling. As part of her plan, she sends her children and mother-in-law to live with Prem and Rupali. Their presence causes strain in Prem's new relationship, as they intentionally create difficulties for Rupali, accusing her of neglect and ill intentions.

Over time, Prem begins to see the superficial nature of his relationship with Rupali, realizing that she was drawn to him for his wealth and status, in contrast to Pooja, who had supported him unconditionally. Rupali eventually reunites with her former boyfriend, Deepak.

Meanwhile, Lakhan, who had been assisting Pooja, shares a platonic bond with Rupali and refers to her as his sister. His wife, Lovely, witnesses a hug between them and misunderstands the situation, prompting her to leave. Lakhan follows her and clarifies the misunderstanding, reaffirming his love by calling her his "Biwi No.1."

== Cast ==
- Anil Kapoor as Dr.Lakhan Khurana, Lovely's husband.
- Salman Khan as Prem Mehra, Pooja's husband.
- Karishma Kapoor as Pooja Mehra, Prem's wife.
- Tabu as Lovely Khurana, Lakhan's wife.
- Sushmita Sen as Rupali Walia, Deepak's girlfriend.
- Saif Ali Khan as Deepak Sharma, Rupalis' boyfriend. (guest appearance)
- Himani Shivpuri as Sushila Mehra, Prem's mother.
- Master Varun as Bunty "Billu" Khurana, Lakhan's and Lovely's son.
- Baby Karishma as Pinky Mehra, Prem's and Pooja's daughter.
- Master Shahrukh as Rinku Mehra, Prem's and Pooja's son.
- Rajeev Verma as Harish Khanna
- Kannu Gill as Meenakshi Khanna
- Guddi Maruti as Travel Agent
- Amitabh Bachchan as himself (special appearance)
- Shashi Kiran

== Music ==
Biwi No.1

Soundtrack album by Anu Malik Sukhwinder Singh
- Released: 8 April 1999
- Genre: Feature film soundtrack
- Label: Tips Music

The Biwi No.1 soundtrack was largely composed by Anu Malik and lyricized by Sameer except for the exceptions noted below. The songs Chunnari Chunnari" and "Ishq Sona Hai" became major hits after their release in 1999. The track "Aan Milo Ya Milne Se" did not feature in the movie. "Chunari Chunari" was later used in the 2001 film Monsoon Wedding, and a remade version was made for the movie Hai Jawani Toh Ishq Hona Hai

No.	Title	Lyrics	Music	Singer(s)	Length
1.	"Chunnari Chunnari"	Sameer	Anu Malik	Abhijeet Bhattacharya, Anuradha Sriram	05:36
2.	"Biwi No.1"	Dev Kohli	Anu Malik	Abhijeet Bhattacharya, Poornima Shrestha	07:19
3.	"Jungle Hai"	Sameer	Anu Malik	Kumar Sanu, Hema Sardesai	06:13
4.	"Ishq Sona Hai"	Sameer	Anu Malik	Shankar Mahadevan, Hema Sardesai	06:17
5.	"Hai Hai Mirchi"	Sukhwinder Singh	Anu Malik	Sukhwinder Singh, Alka Yagnik	05:37
6.	"Mehboob Mere"	Sukhwinder Singh	Sukhwinder Singh	Sukhwinder Singh, Alka Yagnik	05:04
7.	"Mujhe Maaf Karna"	Sameer	Anu Malik	Abhijeet Bhattacharya, Anmol Malik, Aditya Narayan, Alka Yagnik	07:28
8.	"Aan Milo Ya Milne Se"	Sameer	Anu Malik	Kavita Krishnamurthy, Udit Narayan	07:47
Total length:					51:31

== Reception ==
=== Critical reception ===
Biwi No.1 opened to positive reviews from critics upon release, with praise for its screenplay, humor, and performances of the cast, with particular praise for Kapoor and Sen's performances, emerging as a breakthrough for the latter.

=== Box office ===
Despite clashing with the 1999 Cricket World Cup, Biwi No.1 emerged as a major commercial success at the box office, grossing ₹52.80 crore worldwide. It ranked as the second highest-grossing Hindi film of the year, only behind the family drama Hum Saath-Saath Hain, which also starred Salman, Karisma, Tabu, and Saif.

== Accolades ==
Award	Ceremony Date	Category	Recipients and nominees	Results	Ref.
Filmfare Awards	13 February 2000	Best Film	Biwi No.1	Nominated	
Filmfare Awards	13 February 2000	Best Director	David Dhawan	Nominated	
Filmfare Awards	13 February 2000	Best Actress	Karisma Kapoor	Nominated	
Filmfare Awards	13 February 2000	Best Supporting Actress	Sushmita Sen	Won	
Filmfare Awards	13 February 2000	Best Comedian	Anil Kapoor	Nominated	
Filmfare Awards	13 February 2000	Best Comedian	Salman Khan	Nominated	
Filmfare Awards	13 February 2000	Best Music Director	Anu Malik	Nominated	
IIFA Awards	24 June 2000	Best Film	Biwi No.1	Nominated	
IIFA Awards	24 June 2000	Best Director	David Dhawan	Nominated	
IIFA Awards	24 June 2000	Best Actress	Karisma Kapoor	Nominated	
IIFA Awards	24 June 2000	Best Supporting Actor	Anil Kapoor	Nominated	
IIFA Awards	24 June 2000	Best Comedian	Anil Kapoor	Won	
IIFA Awards	24 June 2000	Best Supporting Actress	Sushmita Sen	Won	
IIFA Awards	24 June 2000	Best Supporting Actress	Tabu	Nominated	
IIFA Awards	24 June 2000	Best Supporting Actor	Anil Kapoor	Nominated	
IIFA Awards	24 June 2000	Best Comedian	Anil Kapoor	Won	
Bollywood Movie Awards		Best Supporting Actress	Sushmita Sen	Won	
Bollywood Movie Awards		Best Sensational Actor – Male	Anil Kapoor	Won	
Screen Awards	23 January 2000	Best Film	Biwi No.1	Nominated	
Screen Awards	23 January 2000	Best Director	David Dhawan	Nominated	
Screen Awards	23 January 2000	Best Actress	Karisma Kapoor	Nominated	
Screen Awards	23 January 2000	Best Supporting Actress	Sushmita Sen	Won	
Screen Awards	23 January 2000	Best Comedian	Tabu	Nominated	
Screen Awards	23 January 2000	Best Music Director	Anu Malik	Nominated	
Screen Awards	23 January 2000	Best Screenplay	Rumi Jaffery	Nominated	
Screen Awards	23 January 2000	Best Dialogue	Rumi Jaffery	Nominated	
Screen Awards	23 January 2000	Best Costume Design	Vikram Phadnis	Nominated	
Zee Cine Awards	11 March 2000	Best Actor	Salman Khan	Nominated	
Zee Cine Awards	11 March 2000	Best Actress	Karisma Kapoor	Nominated	
Zee Cine Awards	11 March 2000	Best Supporting Actor	Anil Kapoor	Nominated	
Zee Cine Awards	11 March 2000	Best Supporting Actress	Sushmita Sen	Won	
Zee Cine Awards	11 March 2000	Best Supporting Actress	Tabu	Nominated	
Zee Cine Awards	11 March 2000	Best Music Director	Anu Malik	Nominated	
Zee Cine Awards	11 March 2000	Best Lyricist	Dev Kohli for "Biwi No.1"	Nominated	
