= David Dhawan =

Indian filmmaker (born 1951)

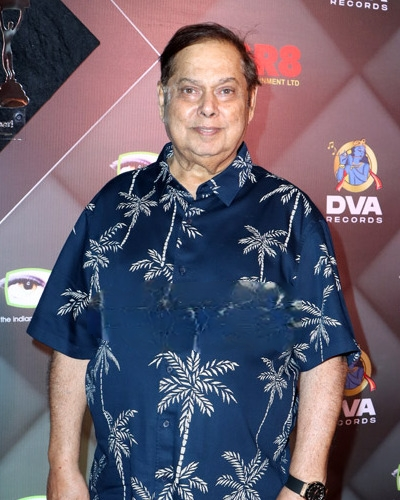
- Dhawan in 2024
- Born: Rajinder Dhawan; 16 August 1951 (age 75); Agartala, Tripura, India
- Occupation: Filmmaker
- Years active: 1989–2026
- Spouse: Karuna Dhawan
- Children: Rohit Dhawan (son); Varun Dhawan (son)
- Relatives: See Dhawan family

David Dhawan (born Rajinder Dhawan; 16 August 1951) is an Indian former film director of Hindi films. A member of the Dhawan family, he has directed 46 films. The 1993 action thriller Aankhen and 1999 comedy Biwi No.1 earned him nominations for the Filmfare Award for Best Director.

His notable works include Swarg (1990), Shola Aur Shabnam, Bol Radha Bol (both 1992), Raja Babu (1994), Coolie No.1 (1995), Saajan Chale Sasural (1996), Judwaa, Hero No. 1, Mr. and Mrs. Khiladi, Deewana Mastana (all 1997), Bade Miyan Chote Miyan (1998), Haseena Maan Jaayegi (1999), Dulhan Hum Le Jayenge (2000), Chal Mere Bhai (2000), Jodi No.1 (2001), Ek Aur Ek Gyarah (2003), Mujhse Shaadi Karogi (2004), Maine Pyaar Kyun Kiya? (2005), Partner (2007), Chashme Baddoor (2013), Main Tera Hero (2014), Judwaa 2 (2017), and Coolie No. 1 (2020).

== Early life ==
David Dhawan was born on 16 August 1951 as Rajinder Dhawan in Agartala, Tripura in to a Punjabi family. His father, a manager in UCO Bank, got transferred to Kanpur, Uttar Pradesh. He studied in Christ Church College and BNSD Inter College until Class XII, and then joined FTII for acting, where he changed his name to David Dhawan, a pet name given by his Jew neighbours in Agartala. Seeing other actors like Satish Shah and Suresh Oberoi, Dhawan realised that he could not act. So he took up editing instead. He became a fan of Manmohan Desai and Hrishikesh Mukherjee. Watching the Bengali film Meghe Dhaka Tara, directed by Ritwik Ghatak, inspired him to pursue filmmaking and passed with a gold medal. Dhawan has two brothers, actors Anil and Ashok.

== Career ==
Dhawan started off as an editor in Saaransh in 1984 before moving into directing. His first film was Taaqatwar (1989). He specialises in directing comedy films. His 1993 film Aankhen, starring Govinda, Chunky Pandey and Kader Khan, was highly successful at the box office, and earned him his first nomination for the Filmfare Award for Best Director. Another successful film was Shola Aur Shabnam. His 2007 film Partner was successful.

Dhawan is on the board of Asian Academy of Film & Television and Asian School of Media Studies where he has been honoured with an academy award by Sandeep Marwah. He was a judge on the Star Plus show Nach Baliye 3 in 2008 and on the show Hans Baliye.

=== Work with Govinda ===
Dhawan first teamed with actor Govinda for the film Taaqatwar (1989). He then formed a collaboration with Govinda and directed 18 films with him as the leading actor, including Swarg (1990), Shola Aur Shabnam (1992), Aankhen (1993), Raja Babu (1994), Coolie No. 1 (1995), Saajan Chale Sasural (1996), Banarasi Babu (1997), Deewana Mastana (1997), Hero No. 1 (1997), Bade Miyan Chote Miyan (1998), Haseena Maan Jaayegi (1999), Kunwara (2000), Jodi No.1 (2001), Kyo Kii... Main Jhuth Nahin Bolta (2001), Ek Aur Ek Gyarah (2003), Partner (2007) and Do Knot Disturb (2009). Partner, which also starred Salman Khan, grossed Rs. 300 Million in India on its opening week, the second highest domestic opening week gross for an Indian film at that time. Dhawan also collaborated with Khan in Biwi No.1 (1999), which emerged as a critical and commercial success, and earned Dhawan his second nomination for the Filmfare Award for Best Director. Dhawan got back to the trio of Govinda, Ritesh Deshmukh and himself with the film, Do Knot Disturb.

=== Retirement ===
In an early 2026 interview, Dhawan said that Hai Jawani Toh Ishq Hona Hai would be his last film as a director.

== Personal life ==
Dhawan is married to Karuna Dhawan (née Chopra), with whom he has two sons, Rohit Dhawan and Varun Dhawan. His brother is actor Anil Dhawan and nephew is actor Siddharth Dhawan.

== Filmography ==
Year	Film	Notes
1989	Taaqatwar	
1989	Gola Barood	
1989	Aag Ka Gola	
1989	Jurrat	Remake of The Untouchables
1990	Swarg	Inspired by Mehrban
1990	Aandhiyan	Remake of Doorian
1992	Shola Aur Shabnam	Inspired by Dil (first half) and Ghayal (second half)
1992	Bol Radha Bol	
1993	Aankhen	Inspired by Anubavi Raja Anubavi
1994	Raja Babu	Inspired by Rasukutty
1994	Eena Meena Deeka	Inspired by Three Fugitives
1994	Andaz	Remake of Sundara Kandam
1995	Yaraana	Based on Sleeping with the Enemy
1995	Coolie No. 1	Remake of Sinna Mapplai
1996	Loafer	Remake of Velai Kidaichuduchu
1996	Saajan Chale Sasural	Remake of Allari Mogudu
1997	Mr and Mrs Khiladi	Remake of Aa Okkati Adakku
1997	Banarasi Babu	Inspired by The Taming of the Shrew and Pattikada Pattanama
1997	Judwaa	Remake of Hello Brother
1997	Deewana Mastana	Inspired by What About Bob?
1997	Hero No. 1	Inspired by Galpo Holeo Satti
1998	Gharwali Baharwali	Remake of Thaikulame Thaikulame
1998	Bade Miyan Chote Miyan	Inspired by Bhranti Bilas and Bad Boys
1999	Biwi No.1	Remake of Sathi Leelavathi
1999	Haseena Maan Jaayegi	Inspired by Pyar Kiye Jaa
2000	Dulhan Hum Le Jayenge	Inspired by Ek Phool Char Kante
2000	Kunwara	Remake of Bavagaru Bagunnara?
2000	Chal Mere Bhai	
2001	Jodi No.1	Inspired by We're No Angels
2001	Kyo Kii... Main Jhuth Nahin Bolta	Inspired by Liar Liar
2002	Chor Machaaye Shor	Remake of Blue Streak
2002	Hum Kisise Kum Nahin	Inspired by Analyze This
2002	Yeh Hai Jalwa	Inspired by Carbon Copy
2003	Ek Aur Ek Gyarah	Remake of Phool Aar Pathar
2004	Mujhse Shaadi Karogi	Inspired by Anger Management
2005	Shaadi No. 1	Remake of Kothigalu Saar Kothigalu; also appeared as himself (opening credits sequence)
2005	Maine Pyaar Kyun Kiya?	Adaptation of Cactus Flower
2007	Partner	Based on Hitch
2009	Do Knot Disturb	Remake of The Valet
2011	Rascals	Remake of Dirty Rotten Scoundrels
2013	Chashme Buddoor	Remake of Chashme Buddoor
2014	Main Tera Hero	Remake of Kandireega
2017	Judwaa 2	Remake of his own Judwaa
2020	Coolie No. 1	Remake of his own Coolie No. 1
2026	Hai Jawani Toh Ishq Hona Hai	Marks the final direction venture.

== Awards and nominations ==
Year	Film	Award Ceremony	Category	Result
1994	Aankhen	Filmfare Awards	Best Director	Nominated
2000	Biwi No.1	Filmfare Awards	Best Director	Nominated
2000	Biwi No.1	Filmfare Awards	Best Film	Nominated
2024	—N/a	Filmfare Awards	Lifetime Achievement Award	Won
