= Hero No. 1 =

1997 Indian film by David Dhawan

- Directed by: David Dhawan
- Written by: Rumi Jaffrey
- Produced by: Vashu Bhagnani
- Starring: Govinda; Karisma Kapoor; Paresh Rawal; Satish Shah; Kader Khan
- Cinematography: K. S. Prakash Rao
- Edited by: A. Muthu
- Music by: Anand-Milind
- Distributed by: S K Enterprise haslingden LTD
- Release date: 21 February 1997
- Country: India
- Language: Hindi
- Budget: ₹6.7 crore

Hero No.1 is a 1997 Indian Hindi-language romantic comedy drama film directed by David Dhawan. An adaptation of the 1972 film Bawarchi by Hrishikesh Mukherjee, which itself is a remake of Bengali film Galpo Holeo Satti (1967), it stars Govinda and Karishma Kapoor in lead roles. It was remade in Telugu as Goppinti Alludu.

== Plot ==
Rajesh Malhotra (Govinda) is the son of a wealthy businessman Dhanraj Malhotra (Kader Khan). However, he is not happy at his home since his father does not let him live his life his way. He escapes from his home and reaches Europe. Meena (Karishma Kapoor) is the granddaughter of Dinanath (Paresh Rawal) and has secured a scholarship to study in Europe. She travels to Europe with her aunt Shanno (Himani Shivpuri).

Rajesh and Meena meet and fall in love. Dhanraj Malhotra reaches Europe in search of his son with assistant Sharma (Rakesh Bedi) and discovers his son is in love. They return to India so that Rajesh and Meena can get married. However, destiny has something else in store for them. As Dhanraj is on his way to discuss about his son's marriage, he accidentally splashes mud on a pedestrian and both end up quarreling. To Dhanraj's surprise, the pedestrian unfortunately turns out to be Dinanath himself, who, upset and angry with the incident, refuses to Dhanraj's proposal of his son's marriage.

Dinanath's house has a problem. They are a joint family and recently the servant Babu (Shakti Kapoor) ran away. They are now in search for a new servant. Rajesh, on realising that his father did a mess up of the meeting with Dinanath, decides to disguise as a servant named Raju and work at Dinanath's home.

Everybody in that home has some problem or the other, which Raju (Govinda) solves through his wit. Dinanath's elder son Vidya Nath (Tiku Talsania) is teacher in a local college, but is always late and bears the College Principal's brunt. Raju helps him to stop his transfer with the help of Education Minister. Dinanath's second son Jeevan Nath(Anil Dhawan), is an insurance agent but does not have many customers. Raju helps him by asking all employees in his father's office to open insurance policies with Jeevan Nath. The younger son, Pappi (Satish Shah) is a struggling music composer. Raju makes him prepare some good music which he uses as his own and gets a break for a film's music. The elder daughter, Shanno is not in good terms with her husband, Sunil, so she stays away from him in her father's home. Raju makes her meet her husband and unites them again. The younger granddaughter, Dimple (Prachi) is a party animal. One day Raju saves her from goons and she becomes a homely girl.

Dinanath is impressed with Raju's acts but one day he finds some valuables missing from his house. Police arrive and find Dhanraj, in the guise of a Chowkidar (portraying Raju's uncle), hiding behind the fridge. Raju and Dhanraj are insulted by the family members and are about to be taken away when Meena reveals Raju's true identity and the sacrifices he has been through for his love.

Dinanath realises Meena and Raju's true love for each other. The next day, as he is going in his car along with Meena to Dhanraj's place, Dhanraj comes along with Rajesh in their way and nearby mud comes splashing over Dhanraj, thus completing Dinanath's revenge. Rajesh and Meena get married.

== Cast ==
- Govinda as Rajesh 'Raju' Malhotra: Meena's love-interest
- Karisma Kapoor as Meena Nath Tripathi: Rajesh's love-interest
- Kader Khan as Dhanraj Malhotra: Rajesh's father
- Paresh Rawal as Dinanath Tripathi: Meena's grandfather
- Tiku Talsania as Vidya Nath Tripathi: Meena's eldest paternal uncle
- Rita Bhaduri as Laxmi Tripathi: Vidya Nath's wife and Meena's eldest paternal aunt
- Anil Dhawan as Jeevan Nath Tripathi: Meena's second paternal uncle
- Himani Shivpuri as Shanno Tripathi / Shanno Mishra: Meena's fraternal aunt
- Shashi Kiran as Sunil Mishra: Shanno's husband and Meena's fraternal uncle
- Shagufta Ali as Paro Tripathi: Jeevan Nath's wife and Meena's second paternal aunt
- Satish Shah as Somnath 'Pappi' Tripathi: Meena's youngest paternal uncle
- Shakti Kapoor as Babu (Special Appearance)
- Rakesh Bedi as Sharma ji: Dhanraj Malhotra's secretary
- Omkar Kapoor as Shekhar 'Rinku' Jeevan Nath Tripathi: Jeevan Nath and Paro's son and Meena's cousin
- Harish Kumar as Meena's prospective husband

== Soundtrack ==
Anand-Milind composed the score. Poornima earned a Zee Cine awards nomination for "Sona Kitna Sona Hain" but lost to Lata Mangeshkar for Dil To Pagal Hai. The song was remade for the 2024 film Crew.

#	Song	Singer(s)	Length
1	"Sona Kitna Sona Hai"	Udit Narayan, Poornima	04:52
2	"Main Paidal Se Jaa Raha"	Vinod Rathod, Poornima	05:38
3	"Main Tujhko Bhaga Laya"	Kumar Sanu, Alka Yagnik	05:06
4	"Saton Janam Tujko"	Kumar Sanu	05:20
5	"Mohabbat Ki Nahin Jaati"	Udit Narayan, Sadhana Sargam	05:50
6	"Tum Humpe Marte Ho"	Vinod Rathod, Sadhana Sargam	05:14
7	"U.P Wala Thumka"	Sonu Nigam	05:12

== Production ==
Some parts of the film were shot in Bern, Switzerland. The song "Mohabbat Ki Nahin Jaati" was shot in Paris.
