= Sapne Sajan Ke =

Sapne Saajan Ke
- Release poster
- Directed by: Lawrence D'Souza
- Written by: Mushtaq Merchant (Dialogue)
- Produced by: Sudhakar Bokade
- Starring: Karishma Kapoor; Rahul Roy; Jackie Shroff
- Cinematography: Lawrence D'Souza
- Music by: Nadeem-Shravan
- Distributed by: Divya Films Combines
- Release date: 24 July 1992 (India)
- Country: India
- Language: Hindi

Sapne Saajan Ke is a 1992 Hindi language movie directed by Lawrence D'Souza, starring Karishma Kapoor, Rahul Roy, and Jackie Shroff.

== Plot ==
Superstar Jackie Shroff's driver was not able to do his job, so he was replaced by his son Deepak.

When Deepak was with Jackie Shroff at a musical night program, Deepak first met with Jyoti, then Kumar Sanu and Alka Yagnik starting a musical number "Ye Dua Hai Meri Rab Se." By the song's end Deepak and Jyoti had fallen in love.

Joyti's mother Shalini wants her to marry the son of wealthy man, Gulu. But Jyoti isn't attracted to Gulu. Shalini agrees with her daughter's choice and lets her marry Deepak. But Jyoti learns that Deepak is not a wealthy man as he pretended to be all along.

== Cast ==
- Karisma Kapoor - Jyoti
- Rahul Roy - Deepak
- Jackie Shroff - Himself
- Dimple Kapadia - Herself
- Gulshan Grover - Gulu/Gulshan
- Aruna Irani - Shalini (Jyoti's mother)
- Shobha Khote - Gulu/Gulshan Mother
- Dinesh Hingoo - Gulu/Gulshan Father
- Reema Lagoo - Deepak's mother
- Alok Nath - Deepak's father
- Yunus Parvez - Astrologer, Special Appearance
- Vikas Anand - Police Inspector
- Kumar Sanu - Himself Special Appearance
- Alka Yagnik - Herself Special Appearance
- Brahm chari - Movie star's secretary

== Soundtrack ==
Sapne Saajan Ke

Soundtrack album by Nadeem Shravan
- Released: 1992
- Recorded: 1991
- Genre: Feature film soundtrack
- Length: 44:34
- Label: Lara Music
- Producer: Nadeem Shravan

Nadeem Shravan chronology
Dil Ka Kya Kasoor (1992)	Sapne Saajan Ke (1992)	Jaan Tere Naam (1992)

The soundtrack was the eighth best-selling Bollywood soundtrack of 1992. The soundtrack was composed by Nadeem-Shravan.

#	Title	Artist(s)	Length
1	"Yeh Dua Hai Meri Rab Se"	Kumar Sanu & Alka Yagnik	06:15
2	"Sapne Sajan Ke"	Kumar Sanu & Alka Yagnik	07:47
3	"Kabhi Bhula Kabhi Yaad Kiya"	Mukul Agarwal & Alka Yagnik	05:58
4	"Aa Raha Hai Maza"	Kumar Sanu & Alka Yagnik	06:30
5	"Shikwa Karoon Ya Shikayat Karoon"	Kumar Sanu & Alka Yagnik	06:13
6	"Kahta Hain Yeh Mausam"	Alka Yagnik	05:58
7	"Dil Ne Jo Socha Tha"	Shailender Singh & Alka Yagnik	05:24
