= Murder Mubarak =

2024 Indian film by Homi Adajania

- Official release poster
- Directed by: Homi Adajania
- Written by: Gazal Dhaliwal; Tamojit Das; Suprotim Sengupta
- Based on: Club You To Death by Anuja Chauhan
- Produced by: Dinesh Vijan
- Starring: Pankaj Tripathi; Karisma Kapoor; Sara Ali Khan; Vijay Varma; Dimple Kapadia; Tisca Chopra; Sanjay Kapoor
- Cinematography: Linesh Desai
- Edited by: Akshara Prabhakar
- Music by: Sachin–Jigar
- Production company: Maddock Films
- Distributed by: Netflix
- Release date: 15 March 2024
- Running time: 142 minutes
- Country: India
- Language: Hindi

Murder Mubarak (transl. Congratulations on Murder) is a 2024 Indian Hindi-language mystery comedy film based on the novel Club You To Death written by Anuja Chauhan. The film is directed by Homi Adajania and produced by Dinesh Vijan. The film features an ensemble cast, including Pankaj Tripathi, Karisma Kapoor, Sara Ali Khan, Vijay Varma, Dimple Kapadia, Sanjay Kapoor, Tisca Chopra, Suhail Nayyar and Tara Alisha Berry.

The film was released on Netflix on 15 March 2024 to mixed reviews from critics.

== Plot ==
The Royal Delhi Club is a place made for the upper class citizens of Delhi, who idolize the British rulers of India. The members of club include:

1. Yash Batra: A drug addict who has returned from rehab, but still can’t overcome his addiction
2. Maharaja Rannvijay Singh: A descendant of a Royal Family who likes to show off his wealth. He is competing for the post of President at club
3. Roshni Batra: Yash's mother, who likes to talk nonsense and brag about everything
4. The Dogras: A middle-aged couple whose son is in a relationship with a Bengali girl
5. Aakash Dogra: The son of Dogras, who has just returned from Kolkata
6. Shehnaaz Noorani: An actress, who is also vying for the post of President at the club.
7. Bambi Todi: A young widow, Aakash's love interest
8. Cookie Katoch: An alcoholic sculptor
9. Bhatti: The current president of the club

And the servants and other working staff:

1. Leo Matthews: A lecherous gym trainer, who has relationships with all women at the club
2. Guppie Ram: A dementia ridden old servant
3. Thinsuk: A gym trainer from Arunachal Pradesh
4. Theju: A gym trainer from Karnataka
5. Minu Dimri: Theju's girlfriend who is also having an affair with Leo
6. Ganga: The beauty parlor lady

The film starts with Tambola night, where an introduction to every character is given. The next day gym trainer Leo Matthews dies from a heavy barbell falling on his windpipe and ACP Bhavani Singh is assigned the case with SI Padam Kumar. President Bhatti believes it to be an open and shut case, but Bhavani Singh believes it to be a murder due to party balloons covering the CCTV camera and a pet cat, Prince Harry alias Hariya, showing signs of sickness. Investigation undergoes with the first characters who saw the dead body: Roshni Batra, Cookie Katoch and Bambi Todi, when they visited the gym. They point towards Aakash Dogra, who claimed to be Leo's lawyer during a fight between Rannvijay Singh and Leo on Tambola Night.

On investigation with Aakash, he reveals that he helped Leo during a drug case. The ladies also claimed Shehnaz Noorani, the actress having an affair with Leo and Rannvijay Singh having an affair with Ganga, the beauty parlor lady. During investigation, Rannvijay Singh becomes defensive about Ganga further strengthening Bhavani's doubts about Rannvijay being the murderer.

Leo's forensic reports reveal presence of a drug named Pinko Haathini in his body in absurd amounts, that makes a human unable to lift even lightest items, let alone a barbell. Bambi overhears this. Interrogation with Guppie Ram, Thinsuk, Theju and Minu all lead to nothing.

A love story between Bambi and Aakash re-ignites and it is revealed Yash Batra, a drug addict and Aakash are best friends. Bambi reveals to Aakash, that after the death of her husband, Anshul, she became kleptomaniac again and Leo knew this, so he was blackmailing her. They report this to ACP Bhavani Singh and it leads them to an orphanage: Shepherd's Orphanage where Bambi had made the donations. The orphanage's donation list contains names of multiple people from the club, which renews interest in them.

Roshni, Rannvijay and Shehnaaz discard the allegations of Leo blackmailing them, whereas flashbacks show something else. The orphanage's limp warden Rakesh sings praises for Leo for bringing in so many donations. Bambi reveals the involvement of the drug Pinko in Leo's death and so Bambi and Aakash go to a club to find dealers who are selling the drug. A dealer reveals that Ganga's husband, Ajay Kumar was involved in dealing drugs to members of the Royal Delhi Club. They also catch Yash buying drugs from the same dealer and so decide to break into his home. Bambi finds packets of the drug in his drawer, of which she captures photos.

At Leo's funeral, Shehnaaz reveals that she gave birth to her daughter during Mumbai Riots. Guppie Ram did not attend the funeral. On questioning Guppie Ram on why he did not attend the funeral, he says that Leo had committed many sins and so his time had come, just like the person before. Bhavani asks which person he was mentioning, but Guppie's dementia kicks in and he does not answer.

On the day of Elections for president of club, Cookie gifts her sculpts of Shehnaaz and Rannvijay. There is a fight between Yash and Aakash over some unknown topic. Guppie Ram cannot find his cat, Hariya, and later finds Hariya burnt inside the kitchen oven. Overridden by guilt, Guppie Ram commits suicide using Rannvijay's flare gun. After their fight, Aakash gives the evidence against Yash to Bhavani Singh, but Bhavani Singh finds nothing at Yash's house. He also mentions an absconded Ajay Kumar, which leads to questioning with Ganga, who says that the only person who knew about Ajay Kumar being violent with her was Rannvijay Singh.

On investigating Rannvijay, it is revealed that he is a poor heir of a declining royal descent and cannot even afford to eat meals twice a day, which he packs from Royal Delhi Club. It is also revealed that he is gay and in a relationship with gym trainer Thinsuk, which Leo knew. Rannvijay Singh is also against excavating the kitchen garden site, named after his late wife. On suspicion, where Bhavani Singh knows that Guppie Ram was pouring acid on kitchen garden, he gets the site excavated. It reveals a human skeleton. They assume it to be of Ajay Kumar, Ganga's absconding husband and send it for forensics. Rannvijay Singh is to be arrested.

The revelation of human skeleton kicks things into action, as Bambi finds footage of Aakash returning to her first anniversary party, the day after which Ajay Kumar is absconding. She also finds footage of Rannvijay Singh beating up Ajay with Ganga by Rannvijay's side. She saves the footage on her phone and deletes it. Leo's tablet is procured by warden Rakesh of Shepherd Orphanage and he calls Aakash to the orphanage.

There are shards of blue crystal found in the left eye socket of the skeleton which are revealed to be rare crystals. Bhavani Singh knows that only one person of club uses such rare crystals and that is Cookie Katoch who sculpts. Cookie reveals she gifted two busts of Mother Teresa to Rannvijay Singh and the Dogras respectively. The bust is found intact at Rannvijay's house, whereas the bust at Dogra's house is missing. Bhavani Singh also gets to know that Aakash returned to the first anniversary party on the day Ajay Kumar went missing.

Bhavani Singh starts suspecting Aakash behind the murders. Aakash and Bambi share an intimate moment, but Aakash finds the earrings he gifted to Bambi in possessions of Leo, which drives a rift between them. Bhavani Singh gets to know of the intimate moments that Bambi shared with Leo and asks her to stay away from the case as she is also a suspect. Meanwhile, Yash tries to commit suicide by overdosing himself and drowning in a bathtub and he leaves behind a letter that says that he loved Bambi so much that he could not bear Bambi getting close to Aakash again.

In a shocking turn of events, Ajay Kumar is captured alive and he says that Aakash wanted him behind bars, that was the reason he was absconding. Bhavani Singh gathers everyone at the club and reveals that the skeleton found in Kitchen garden was not of Ajay Kumar, but of Anshul, Bambi's dead husband, who was supposed to be dead in an accident on way to Uttarakhand. He also reveals that the warden of Shepherd Orphanage, Rakesh was Shehnaz's son, whom she gave birth during Mumbai Riots. Bhavani Singh first claims that Yash killed Anshul because he loved Bambi and he could not bear Bambi marrying Anshul. Guppie Ram was Yash's associate. Roshni, Yash's mother becomes defendant of her son saying that he will never commit such a heinous act. Bhavani Singh puts forward another theory that Aakash killed Anshul on the day of Anshul and Bambi's first anniversary. There is missing evidence due to footage being deleted and the bust missing from Dogras, which was the weapon. He also claims Aakash killed Leo because Leo knew about this and was blackmailing Aakash and Bambi. Aakash is defiant of claims but gives in and accepts prison sentence.

Looking at the love of her life getting prison sentence, Bambi makes confessions. She confesses that Anshul was having an affair with Ganga and wanted to divorce Bambi and marry Ganga. Bambi wanted to keep the image of their perfect marriage in front of the club and asked Anshul not to divorce her, but Anshul did not budge. In anger, she used the bust, gifted to her by Aakash's grandmother as a weapon and it killed Anshul. She told Guppie Ram that Anshul had raped Ganga and so Guppie Ram helped Bambi hide his body in the kitchen garden and that was why he was pouring acid on the kitchen garden. One night, Leo made Guppie drunk and Guppie revealed the secret of Bambi. Leo started blackmailing Bambi and so Bambi decided to kill Leo with the drug Pinko. She tried to frame Yash for the murder but Yash cleaned up the planted drugs before police could reach there. She kept Hariya in the oven and sent Guppie on a guilt trip which killed him. She also tried to kill Yash by overdosing him and drowning him in the bathtub, but Yash was saved. Bambi is incarcerated and Aakash walks out free as Bambi's lawyer.

At the end of the movie, Bhavani Singh advises Aakash to stay out of Bambi's case. It is also revealed that Aakash has no girlfriend in Kolkata.

== Cast ==
- Pankaj Tripathi as ACP Bhavani Singh
- Karisma Kapoor as Shehnaz Noorani
- Sara Ali Khan as Bambi Todi
- Vijay Varma as Kaashi / Aakash Dogra
- Dimple Kapadia as Cookie Katoch
- Tisca Chopra as Roshni Batra
- Sanjay Kapoor as Rannvijay Singh
- Suhail Nayyar as Yash Batra
- Tara Alisha Berry as Ganga
- Aashim Gulati as Leo Mathews
- Deven Bhojani as Devendra Bhatti
- Rohit Rajvansh as Movie Director
- Ashok Chhabra as Shaan Thakur
- Alok Panwar as Ajay Kumar
- Brijendra Kala as Guppie Ram
- Nikhil Khurana as Warden Ashok
- Rajat Malhotra as Chef
- Purnendu Bhattacharya as Brigadier Balbir Dogra
- Grusha Kapoor as Mrs. Dogra - Mala
- Trilochan Kalra as Anshul's father
- Beila Gupta as Anshul's mother
- Varun Mitra as Anshul
- Priyank Tiwary as PK, SI Padam Kumar
- Kiara Sadh as Little Girl
- Hardeep Gupta as Bambi's Mother
- Hitesh Sejpal as Bambi's Father
- Hardika Sharma as Young Bambi
- Abeer Jain as Young Kaashi
- Bobby Singh as Minister Gagan Ruia
- Balakrishnan Natarajan as Police Chief Commissioner Samir Faruqui

== Production ==
=== Filming ===
Principal photography commenced in February 2023 and wrapped in April 2023.

== Release ==
The film was released on Netflix on 15 March 2024, while the satellite rights were sold to Zee Network.

== Music ==
Murder Mubarak

Soundtrack album by Sachin–Jigar
- Released: 22 March 2024
- Recorded: 2022
- Genre: Feature film soundtrack
- Length: 12:36
- Language: Hindi
- Label: Zee Music Company

Sachin–Jigar chronology
Farrey (2023)	Murder Mubarak (2024)	Munjya (2024)

Official audio
- Murder Mubarak - Full Album on YouTube

The music is composed by Sachin–Jigar. The lyrics are written by Priya Saraiya.

The first song of the film "Yaad Aave" was released on 8 March 2024. The second song "Bhola Bhala Baby" was released on 12 March 2024.

No.	Title	Singer (S)	Length
1.	"Yaad Aave"	Sachin-Jigar, Simran Choudhary, Varun Jain, The Rish	3:40
2.	"Killer Killer"	Raghav, Sachin-Jigar, Asees Kaur	2:42
3.	"Bhola Bhala Baby"	Shilpa Rao	3:53
4.	"Murder Mubarak - Title Track"	Yashraj, Prakriti Kakar, Sachin-Jigar	2:21
Total length:			12:36

== Reception ==
On the review aggregator website Rotten Tomatoes, 63% of 16 critics' reviews are positive, with an average rating of 5.4/10.

NDTV's Saibal Chatterjee rated the film 3/5, and opined: "The film does not rely on action for effect. And the script ensures that talk isn't dull. The editing keeps pace with the speed at which the investigation unfolds and the directorial flourishes ensure that the film is never less than riveting." A critic from Bollywood Hungama rated the film 2.5 out of five stars, and wrote: "Despite a slow narrative Murder Mubarak rests on the performances and unpredictable climax."

Shubhra Gupta of The Indian Express rated the film 2.5 out of five stars, and stated: "This is the closest any film has come to re-creating Anuja Chauhan’s universe, very few can do the insider-outsider divide with such acuteness, both sharp and warm." Sukanya Verma of Rediff gave 2/5 stars and felt that "Despite director Homi Adajania’s ease around quirky ensembles and macabre touches, Murder Mubarak fails to draw the viewer into its shallow world of the vain and wealthy".
