= 2000 Zee Cine Awards =

3rd Zee Cine Awards
- Date: 11 March 2000
- Site: Andheri Sports Complex, Mumbai

Highlights
- Best Picture: Hum Dil De Chuke Sanam
- Best Direction: Sanjay Leela Bhansali (Hum Dil De Chuke Sanam)
- Best Actor: Aamir Khan (Sarfarosh)
- Best Actress: Aishwarya Rai Bachchan (Hum Dil De Chuke Sanam)
- Most awards: Hum Dil De Chuke Sanam (11)
- Most nominations: Hum Dil De Chuke Sanam (25)

The 3rd Zee Cine Awards also The 3rd Lux Zee Cine Awards ceremony, presented by Zee Entertainment Enterprises, honored the best Indian Hindi-language films of 1999. The ceremony was held on 11 March 2000 at Andheri Sports Complex, Mumbai.

Hum Dil De Chuke Sanam led the ceremony with 25 nominations, followed by Hum Saath-Saath Hain with 12 nominations, and Sarfarosh and Taal with 11 nominations each.

Hum Dil De Chuke Sanam won 11 awards, including Best Film, Best Director (for Sanjay Leela Bhansali) and Best Actress (for Aishwarya Rai), thus becoming the most-awarded film at the ceremony.

== Awards ==
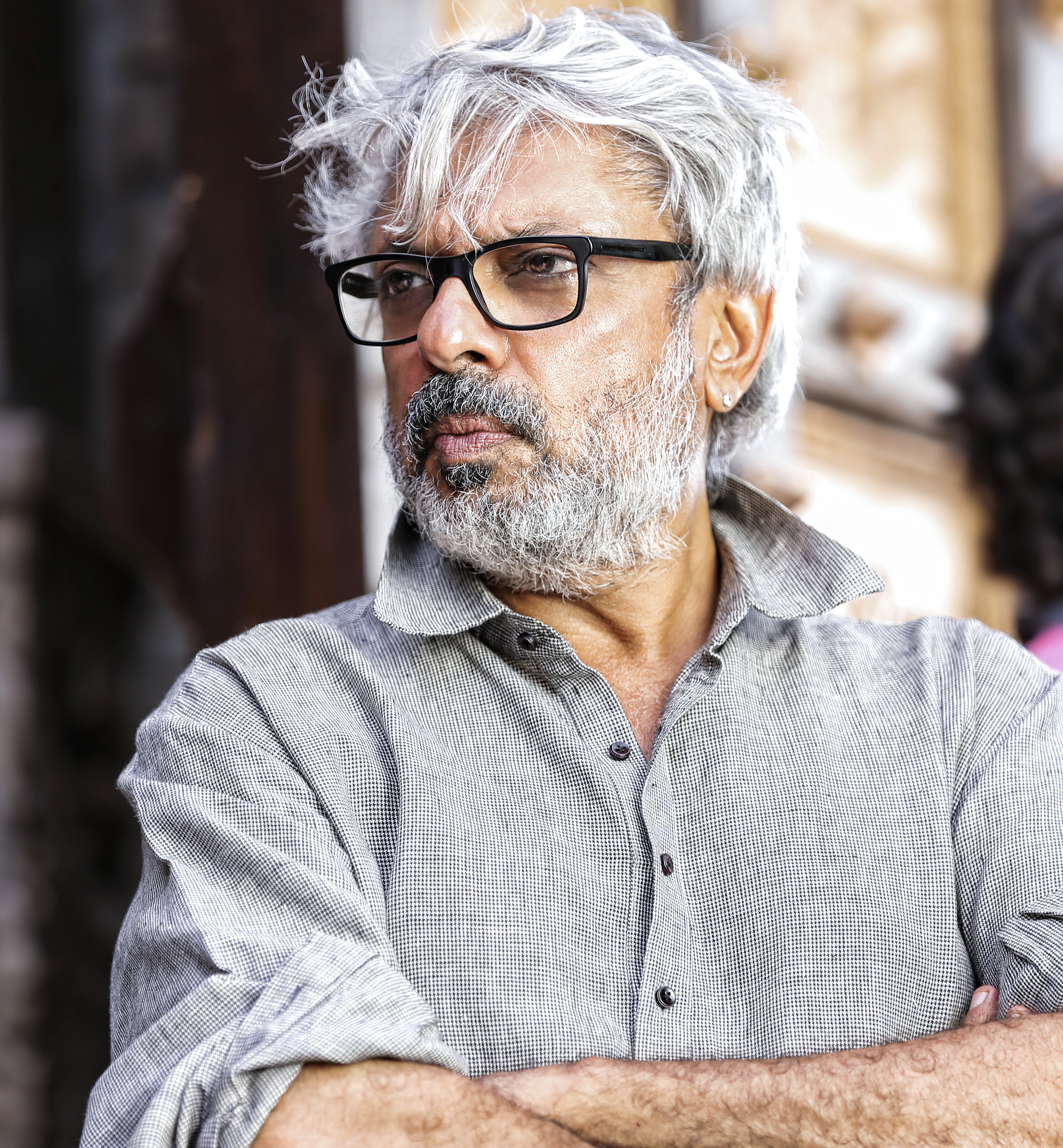
Sanjay Leela Bhansali — Best Director winner for Hum Dil De Chuke Sanam

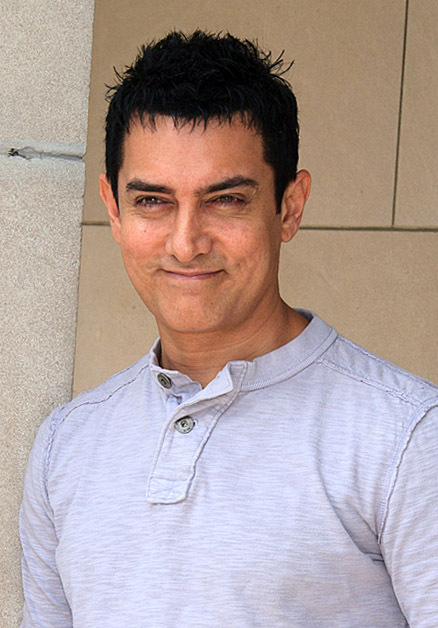
Aamir Khan — Best Actor winner for Sarfarosh

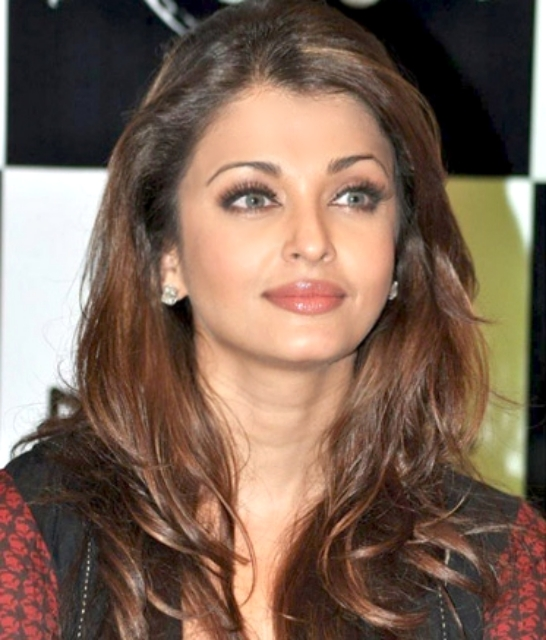
Aishwarya Rai Bachchan — Best Actress winner for Hum Dil De Chuke Sanam

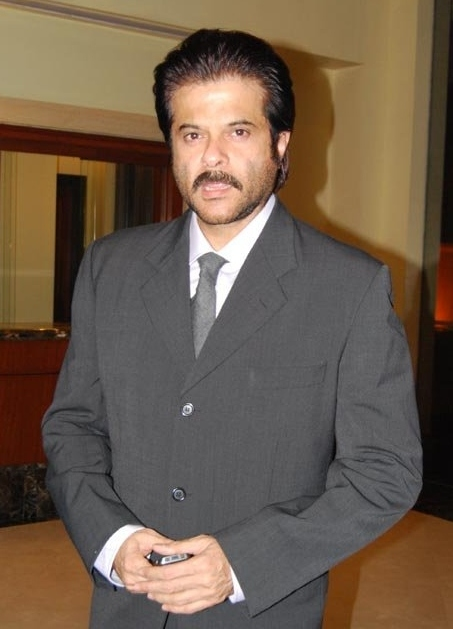
Anil Kapoor — Best Supporting Actor winner for Taal

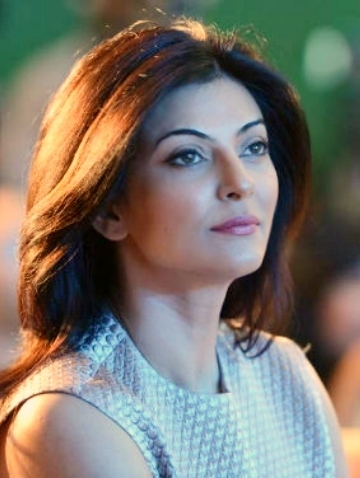
Sushmita Sen — Best Supporting Actress winner for Biwi No.1

The winners and nominees have been listed below. Winners are listed first, highlighted in boldface, and indicated with a double dagger (‡).

=== Popular Awards ===
| Best Film | Best Director |
|---|---|
| **Hum Dil De Chuke Sanam**‡ | **Sanjay Leela Bhansali – Hum Dil De Chuke Sanam**‡; Gulzar – Hu Tu Tu; John Matthew Matthan – Sarfarosh; Mahesh Manjrekar – Vaastav: The Reality; Sooraj Barjatya – Hum Saath-Saath Hain |
| Best Actor | Best Actress |
| **Aamir Khan – Sarfarosh**‡; Ajay Devgn – Hum Dil De Chuke Sanam; Salman Khan – Biwi No.1; Salman Khan – Hum Saath-Saath Hain; Shah Rukh Khan – Baadshah | **Aishwarya Rai Bachchan – Hum Dil De Chuke Sanam**‡; Aishwarya Rai Bachchan – Taal; Kajol – Dil Kya Kare; Kajol – Hum Aapke Dil Mein Rehte Hain; Karisma Kapoor – Biwi No.1 |
| Best Supporting Actor | Best Supporting Actress |
| **Anil Kapoor – Taal**‡; Anil Kapoor – Biwi No.1; Anupam Kher – Hum Aapke Dil Mein Rehte Hain; Mohnish Bahl – Hum Saath-Saath Hain; Mukesh Rishi – Sarfarosh | **Sushmita Sen – Biwi No.1**‡; Moushumi Chatterjee – Aa Ab Laut Chalen; Neelam Kothari – Hum Saath-Saath Hain; Tabu – Biwi No.1 |
| Best Performance in a Villainous Role | Best Performance in a Comic Role |
| **Ashutosh Rana – Sangharsh**‡; Amrish Puri – Baadshah; Amrish Puri – Taal; Gulshan Grover – Hindustan Ki Kasam; Naseeruddin Shah – Sarfarosh | **Govinda – Haseena Maan Jaayegi**‡; Kader Khan – Haseena Maan Jaayegi; Johnny Lever – Baadshah; Johnny Lever – Hum Aapke Dil Mein Rehte Hain; Saif Ali Khan – Hum Saath-Saath Hain |
| Best Male Debut | Best Female Debut |
| **Aftab Shivdasani – Mast**‡ | **Rinke Khanna – Pyaar Mein Kabhi Kabhi**‡ |
| Best Music Director | Best Lyrics |
| **A. R. Rahman – Taal**‡; Anu Malik – Biwi No.1; Anu Malik – Hum Aapke Dil Mein Rehte Hain; Ismail Darbar – Hum Dil De Chuke Sanam; Raam–Laxman – Hum Saath-Saath Hain | **Anand Bakshi – "Ishq Bina" – Taal**‡; Anand Bakshi – "Taal Se Taal" – Taal; Dev Kohli – "Biwi No.1" – Biwi No.1; Israr Ansari – "Zindagi Maut Na Ban Jaye" – Sarfarosh; Mehboob – "Chand Chupa Badal Mein" – Hum Dil De Chuke Sanam |
| Best Playback Singer – Male | Best Playback Singer – Female |
| **Udit Narayan – "Chand Chupa Badal Mein" – Hum Dil De Chuke Sanam**‡ | **Kavita Krishnamurti – "Nimbooda" – Hum Dil De Chuke Sanam**‡ |

=== Technical Awards ===
| Best Story | Best Screenplay |
|---|---|
| **Pratap Karvat, Sanjay Leela Bhansali – Hum Dil De Chuke Sanam**‡ | **Mahesh Manjrekar – Vaastav: The Reality**‡; Atul Tiwari – Shaheed Udham Singh; John Matthew Matthan – Sarfarosh; Sanjay Leela Bhansali – Hum Dil De Chuke Sanam; Sanjay–Vivek Vaswani – Sar Ankhon Par |
| Best Dialogue | Best Cinematography |
| **Amrik Gill – Hum Dil De Chuke Sanam**‡; Atul Tiwari – Shaheed Udham Singh; Gulzar – Hu Tu Tu; Hriday Lani–Pathik Vats – Sarfarosh; Sanjay Chhel – Khoobsurat | **Anil Mehta – Hum Dil De Chuke Sanam**‡; Govind Nihalani – Thakshak; Ishwar Bidri – Hindustan Ki Kasam; Kabir Lal – Taal; Rajan Kothari – Godmother |
| Best Choreography | Best Action |
| **Saroj Khan – "Nimbooda" – Hum Dil De Chuke Sanam**‡; Jay Borade – "Maiyya Yashoda" – Hum Saath-Saath Hain; Samir Tanna–Arsh Tanna – "Dholi Taro Dhol Baje" – Hum Dil De Chuke Sanam; Shiamak Davar – "Kahin Aag Lage" – Taal; Vaibhavi Merchant – "Aankhon Ki Gustakhiyan" – Hum Dil De Chuke Sanam | **Tinu Verma – Arjun Pandit**‡; Kaushal–Moses – Baadshah; Raam Shetty – Vaastav: The Reality; Abbas–Hanif – Sarfarosh; Jai Singh Nijjar – Hindustan Ki Kasam |
| Best Editing | Best Art Direction |
| **Mukhtar Ahmed – Hum Saath-Saath Hain**‡; Bela Sehgal – Hum Dil De Chuke Sanam; Chaitanya Tanna – Hum Aapke Dil Mein Rehte Hain; Rahul Rawail – Arjun Pandit; Renu Saluja – Godmother | **Nitin Chandrakant Desai – Hum Dil De Chuke Sanam**‡; Bijon Dasgupta – Hum Saath-Saath Hain; Keshto Mandal – Sarfarosh; Samir Chanda – Mast; Sharmishta Roy – Taal |
| Best Background Score | Best Sound Recording |
| **Raam–Laxman – Hum Saath-Saath Hain**‡; Aadesh Shrivastava – Arjun Pandit; Anjan Biswas – Hum Dil De Chuke Sanam; Surinder Sodhi – Baadshah; Vishal Bhardwaj – Godmother | **Jagmohan Anand – Daag**‡; Jitendra Chaudhary – Hum Dil De Chuke Sanam; Namita Nayak – Sarfarosh; Narinder Singh – Hum Saath-Saath Hain; Rakesh Ranjan – Taal |
| Best Make Up Artist | Best Re-Recording |
| **Deepak Bhatee – Sarfarosh**‡; Hemchandra Sawant – Vaastav: The Reality; Kiran R. Naik – Taal; Pappu Gondane – Aa Ab Laut Chalen; Suresh S. Harital – Hu Tu Tu | **Hitendra Ghosh – Jaanwar**‡; Anup Dev – Baadshah; B.K. Chaturvedi – Godmother; Kuldip Sood – Hum Saath-Saath Hain; Suresh Kathuria – Hum Dil De Chuke Sanam |
| Best Costume Design | Best Song Recording |
| **Mandira Shukla – Godmother**‡; Neeta Lulla – Hum Dil De Chuke Sanam; Shabina Khan – Hum Dil De Chuke Sanam | **Satish Gupta – Kachche Dhaage**‡; Bishwadeep Chatterjee – Hum Dil De Chuke Sanam; Daman Sood – Khoobsurat; Pradeep Choudhury – Baadshah |
| Best Special Effects (Visual) | Best Technical Director |
| **Prasad Sutar & Madhar Gotad – Hindustan Ki Kasam**‡; Kishor–Chetan – Kartoos; Manish Sharma – Lo Main Aagaya; Nitin Bhalla – Kohram; Ramesh Meer – Hum Dil De Chuke Sanam | **Mahesh Manjrekar – Vaastav: The Reality**‡ |

=== Special awards ===
Lifetime Achievement Award
| **Mukhram Sharma** | **Nasir Hussain** |
| **Pran** | **Ravi** |
Lux Face of the Year
**Aishwarya Rai Bachchan** (Hum Dil De Chuke Sanam & Taal)

== Superlatives ==
Multiple nominations
| Nominations | Film |
|---|---|
| 25 | Hum Dil De Chuke Sanam |
| 12 | Hum Saath-Saath Hain |
| 11 | Sarfarosh |
| 11 | Taal |
| 7 | Baadshah |
| 7 | Biwi No.1 |
| 5 | Godmother |
| 5 | Hum Aapke Dil Mein Rehte Hain |
| 5 | Vaastav: The Reality |
| 4 | Hindustan Ki Kasam |
| 3 | Arjun Pandit |
| 3 | Hu Tu Tu |
| 2 | Aa Ab Laut Chalen |
| 2 | Haseena Maan Jaayegi |
| 2 | Khoobsurat |
| 2 | Mast |
| 2 | Shaheed Udham Singh |

Multiple wins
| Awards | Film |
|---|---|
| 11 | Hum Dil De Chuke Sanam |
| 4 | Taal |
| 2 | Hum Saath-Saath Hain |
| 2 | Sarfarosh |
| 2 | Vaastav: The Reality |
