= Hum Saath-Saath Hain =

1999 Bollywood film by Sooraj Barjatya

- Film poster
- Directed by: Sooraj R. Barjatya
- Written by: Sooraj R. Barjatya
- Produced by: Ajit Kumar Barjatya Kamal Kumar Barjatya Rajkumar Barjatya
- Starring: Salman Khan; Karisma Kapoor; Saif Ali Khan; Tabu; Sonali Bendre; Mohnish Bahl; Neelam Kothari
- Cinematography: Rajan Kinagi
- Edited by: Mukhtar Ahmed
- Music by: Raamlaxman
- Production companies: Rajshri Productions; Amber Entertainment
- Distributed by: Rajshri Productions; Zee International
- Release date: 5 November 1999
- Running time: 177 minutes
- Country: India
- Language: Hindi
- Budget: ₹10 crore
- Box office: ₹81.71 crore

Hum Saath-Saath Hain (transl. We are together), also abbreviated as HSSH, is a 1999 Indian Hindi-language family drama film written and directed by Sooraj Barjatya under the production and distribution of Rajshri Productions. The film stars an ensemble cast with Salman Khan, Karisma Kapoor, Saif Ali Khan, Tabu, Sonali Bendre, Mohnish Bahl, Neelam Kothari, Mahesh Thakur with Alok Nath, Reema Lagoo, Satish Shah, Sadashiv Amrapurkar, Shammi, Rajeev Verma, Ajit Vachani and Himani Shivpuri in supporting roles. The story centers on a joint family and its values and togetherness, who grow apart after a misunderstanding.

Hum Saath-Saath Hain: We Stand United is the third film to feature Salman Khan with Rajshri Productions. Principal photography took place in Mumbai and various locations in Rajasthan. The film's cinematography was done by Rajan Kinagi. Raamlaxman composed its music and lyrics are written by Dev Kohli.

Hum Saath Saath Hain was released on 5 November 1999, and eventually became the highest-grossing film of the year and one of biggest blockbusters of the decade, with a worldwide gross of ₹81.7 crore (US$18.98 million). The film was also dubbed in Telugu and released with the title Premanuragam.

At the 45th Filmfare Awards, Bahl received a Best Supporting Actor nomination. At the 3rd Zee Cine Awards, the film earned 12 nominations including Best Actor for Salman Khan, and won two awards. Also, at the 1st IIFA Awards, the film won the Best Makeup for Jayanti Shevale.

== Plot ==
The movie surrounds Ramkishan Chaturvedi(Alok Nath) a rich businessman, his wife Mamta, and his four children. Vivek is Ramkishan's first son from his deceased first wife, Lakshmi. Despite not being related by blood, Mamta and Vivek share a deep familial bond. Mamta and Ramkishan's three children are named Prem, Sangeeta, and Vinod. During childhood, Vivek was injured while trying to save Prem and Vinod from a probable accident, which left his right arm partially paralyzed. Vivek is an idealistic, responsible, self-sacrificing character; Prem is sensitive and soft-spoken; and Vinod is energetic and playful. The entire family is fiercely loyal and devoted to one another.

Nineteen years later, Prem returns home from US after completing his studies and getting trained in the family business. Sangeeta is happily married to her husband Anand, and they have a daughter, Radhika. Vinod is busy with studies and preparing for his training in the family business. Vivek is still undergoing treatment for his hand and takes care of the family business. At Ramkishan and Mamta's anniversary function, the four siblings gather to wish them with respect.

Seeing Vivek's love for them, Sadhna, the daughter of Ramkishan's business associate Adarsh, is drawn to him. Adarsh sends a marriage proposal to Ramkishan's family. Though initially hesitant about how his paralysis could impact a spouse, Vivek agrees and marries Sadhna. Prem and Preeti, Pritam's daughter, have been in love secretly since childhood, and they get engaged. Vinod is secretly in love with Sapna, the daughter of Dharamraj Bajpai, Ramkishan's former neighbor in his ancestral village, Rampur. Prem and Preeti find out about Vinod and Sapna at a family outing during Vivek's and Sadhna's honeymoon at Rampur, where they both get engaged as well. Ramkishan makes Vivek the managing director of his company.

A bitter turn comes when Anand's brother Anurag cheats him out of inheritance and share in the family business, and Anand & Sangeeta should look for a separate business and a separate home for themselves, so they decide to shift to Bangalore for the growing computer industry. This incident makes Mamta fear her sons' futures. Influenced by her three friends and Dharamraj, Mamta begins to fear that Vivek, as the eldest and managing director, will eventually sideline Prem and Vinod. Mamta then demands Ramkishan divide the business equally among all their children. Ramkishan disagrees as it will divide the family.

Heartbroken by Mamta's sudden change in attitude, Vivek voluntarily steps down to maintain peace within the family. He requests Ramkishan to put Prem in charge of the family business and the company as the managing director. Vivek moves back to their ancestral village Rampur with a pregnant Sadhna to take care of the new factory. Vinod accompanies them.

Prem refuses to replace Vivek as head of the family business and the managing director. Vivek convinces him to go along with the plan in the interest of preventing further conflict within the family. Prem tells Mamta that he won't marry and can't replace Vivek and Sadhna like she wants. Eventually, Anurag realizes his mistake and reunites with Anand and Sangeeta.

Sangeeta asks Mamta to bring back Vivek. Mamta realizes her mistakes and visits Rampur with Ramkishan. In the hospital, Sadhna delivers a baby boy. Vivek and Mamta reconcile. Later, Prem and Vinod marry Preeti and Sapna, respectively. Dharamraj apologizes and realizes that ill manners cannot end the love in the family. Vivek, with his right arm now healed, returns as the managing director of the company and takes charge of the family business again. And they all live happily ever after for Vivek-Sadhna, Prem-Preeti, Anand-Sangeeta, and Vinod-Sapna.

== Cast ==
- Salman Khan as Prem Chaturvedi
- Karisma Kapoor as Sapna Chaturvedi
- Saif Ali Khan as Vinod Chaturvedi
- Tabu as Sadhna Chaturvedi
- Sonali Bendre as Dr. Preeti Shukla Chaturvedi
- Mohnish Bahl as Vivek Chaturvedi
- Mahesh Thakur as Anand Pandey
- Neelam as Sangeeta Chaturvedi Pandey
- Reema Lagoo as Mamta Awasthi Chaturvedi
- Alok Nath as Ramkishan Chaturvedi
- Shakti Kapoor as Anwar Khan ‘Bhaijaan’
- Satish Shah as Pritam Shukla
- Sadashiv Amrapurkar as Dharamraj Bajpai
- Rajiv Verma as Adarsh Sharma
- Ajit Vachani as Advocate Pranab Awasthi
- Himani Shivpuri as Neenakshi Awasthi
- Shammi as Durga Devi
- Dilip Dhawan as Anurag Pandey
- Sheela Sharma as Jyoti Pandey
- Kunickaa Sadanand as Shanti Goel
- Jayshree T. as Krishna Verma
- Kalpana Iyer as Shobha Gupta
- Huma Khan as Rehana Begum Khan
- Jatin Kanakia as Dr. Rajiv Sen
- Dinesh Hingoo as Raghuveer Singh
- Zoya Afroz as Radhika Pandey
- Achyut Potdar as Asif Ali Baig
- Zaki Mukaddam as Rajeev "Raju" Pandey
- Hardik Tanna as Aditya "Bablu" Pandey

== Production ==
=== Development ===
Hum Saath-Saath Hain: We Stand United's concept was conceived by Sooraj Barjatya, who wanted to make a family drama. The film is produced under his banner Rajshri Productions, the 48th film under the banner and Barjatya's third film as a director. The film was a modern-day adaptation of the epic Ramayana. Lyricist Raghvendra Singh worked as an assistant director for the film.

=== Casting ===
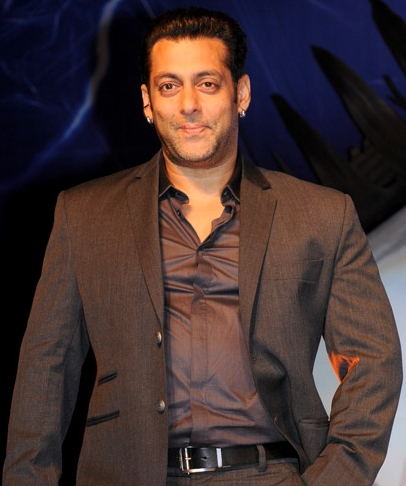
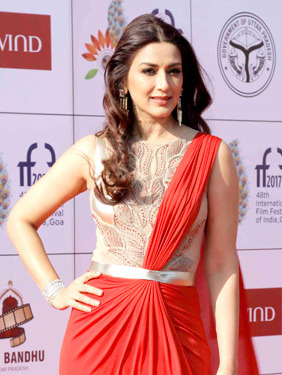
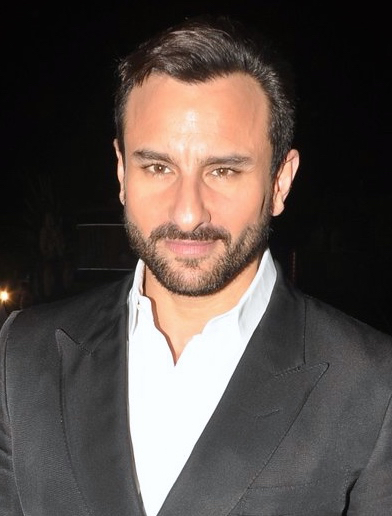
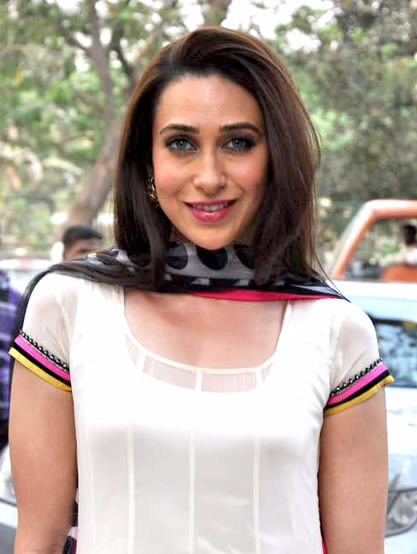
The film starred Salman Khan, Tabu, Sonali Bendre, Karisma Kapoor and Saif Ali Khan in the lead roles.

Reema Lagoo (as Mamta), Alok Nath (as Ramkishan), Himani Shivpuri (as Neenakshi), Satish Shah (as Pritam) and Ajit Vachani (as Pranab) were cast. It marks their second film with Barjatya after Hum Aapke Hain Koun..!. For Salman, Lagoo, Nath, Bahl, and Vachani, it was their third film with Barjatya after Maine Pyar Kiya.

Salman Khan was cast as Prem, marking his eighth film with the same character name. Salman at that point, found the character to be "similar to him" in real life. For Preeti's role, Barjatya first approached Raveena Tandon, who refused the part due to it being a multi-starrer. Later, Sonali Bendre was cast as Dr. Preeti. It marked Bendre's only film opposite Salman Khan. Bendre said that she knew exactly what she was "supposed to do" for her character, after the narration.

Vivek's role was first offered to Anil Kapoor and later to Rishi Kapoor but after their refusal, Mohnish Bahl was cast as Vivek. Bahl made it a habit to keep his right hand in his pocket, as per the role's requirement. Bahl called Vivek's character "an opportunity of a lifetime". Barjatya approached Madhuri Dixit for Sadhna's role, who declined. Manisha Koirala was offered the role, who refused due to filming of her film Mann. Finally Tabu was cast as Sadhna.

Later, Karisma Kapoor (as Sapna), Saif Ali Khan (as Vinod) and Neelam (as Sangita) were cast. Kapoor called working with Barjatya a "dream come true" experience. The makers offered Rishi Kapoor, Anand's role, but he again refused, it was then offered to Nitish Bharadwaj, who refused too. Finally Mahesh Thakur was cast as Anand.

Zoya Afroz was cast as Sangita and Anand's daughter Radhika. Also, Shakti Kapoor (as Anwar), Sadashiv Amrapurkar (as Dharamraj), Rajiv Verma (as Adarsh), Sheela Sharma (as Jyoti) and Dilip Dhawan (as Anurag), were cast in other prominent roles.

=== Filming ===
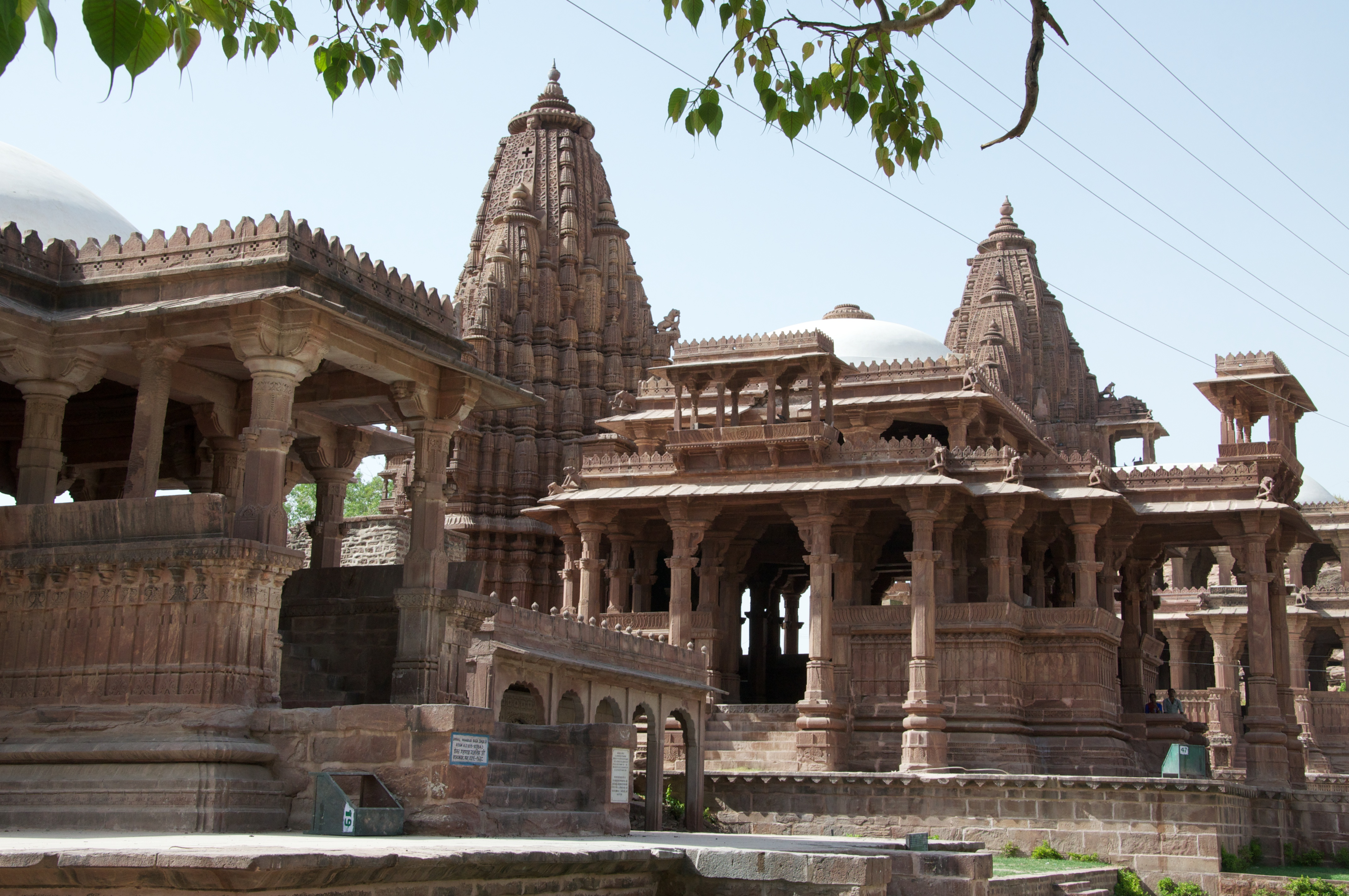
A portion of the film was shot at the Mandore

The principal photography commenced in 1998. A major portion of the film was shot at the Film City, Mumbai. The filming of other scenes of the film including the song "Mhare Hiwade Mein Naache Mor" was done in Jodhpur, Rajasthan. Mandore Gardens, Mehrangarh Fort, and Jaswant Thada, were some of the locations in Jodhpur where the film was shot. The rain sequence of "Mhare Hiwade", was also shot at Chennakeshava Temple, Somanathapura.

=== Post-production ===
During the post-production stage of the film, the filmmaker announced a unique campaign for its promotions. The team of Hum Saath-Saath Hain and Coca-Cola launched a nationwide marketing programme called 'Coca-Cola Hum Saath Saath Hain'. The common ad campaign laid equal focus on both the soft drink brand and the film. The Barjatyas were quite press-friendly during the making of their previous films, but for Hum Saath-Saath Hain, the press screening was restricted to an elite few.

== Controversy ==
During the Jodhpur film schedule in 1998, some members of the cast, Salman Khan, Saif Ali Khan, Neelam Kothari, Tabu, and Sonali Bendre, were involved in a case of shooting of an endangered black buck on a hunting expedition, on the outskirts of Kankani village in Jodhpur district of Rajasthan. The incident generated significant press coverage and Salman Khan spent a week in Jodhpur jail in 2007, before the court granted him bail. In 2018, the Jodhpur court convicted him and acquitted the others. In 2019, Rajasthan High Court issued a notice challenging the acquittal of Sonali Bendre, Tabu and Saif.

== Soundtrack ==
Hum Saath-Saath Hain

Soundtrack album by Raamlaxman
- Released: October 1999
- Recorded: 1999
- Genre: Feature film soundtrack
- Length: 44:16
- Language: Hindi
- Label: Saregama
- Producers: Ajit Kumar Barjatya; Kamal Kumar Barjatya; Rajkumar Barjatya

Raamlaxman chronology
Dulhan Banoo Main Teri (1999)	Hum Saath-Saath Hain (1999)	Manchala (1999)

Singles from Hum Saath-Saath Hain
- 1. "Mhare Hiwda" Released: October 1999; 2. "Maiyya Yashoda" Released: October 1999

Raamlaxman composed the music, teaming up with Sooraj Barjatya for the third and the last time. Raamlakshman had composed as many as 27 tunes, out of which the soundtrack of the film features seven songs and playback singers: Kavita Krishnamurthy (for Karishma Kapoor), Alka Yagnik (for Sonali Bendre), Anuradha Paudwal (for Tabu), Kumar Sanu (for Salman Khan), Udit Narayan (for Saif Ali Khan), Hariharan (for Mohnish Behl), Sonu Nigam (for Shakti Kapoor), Hema Sardesai (for Neelam), Roop Kumar Rathod (for Ajit Vachani) and Pratima Rao (for Himani Shivpuri).

Raamlaxman plagiarised the melody for the song "A B C D" from the Spanish singer Jeanette's 1974 song "Porque te vas". The remaining songs on the album include the title track "Hum Saath Saath Hain", the wedding tracks "Chhote Chhote Bhaiyon Ke" and "Sunoji Dulhan", "Yeh To Sach Hai Ki Bhagwan Hai", "Mhare Hiwda" and "Maiyya Yashoda".

No.	Title	Singer(s)	Length
1.	"Maiya Yashoda"	Anuradha Paudwal, Kavita Krishnamurthy & Alka Yagnik	6:24
2.	"Mhare Hiwra Mein Nache Mor"	Hariharan, Anuradha Paudwal, Kumar Sanu, Udit Narayan, Kavita Krishnamurthy & Alka Yagnik	6:20
3.	"Chhote Chhote Bhaiyon Ke"	Udit Narayan, Kavita Krishnamurthy & Kumar Sanu	4:19
4.	"Hum Saath-Saath Hain"	Hariharan, Anuradha Paudwal, Kumar Sanu, Udit Narayan, Kavita Krishnamurthy & Alka Yagnik	3:58
5.	"Ye Toh Sach Hai Ke Bhagwan"	Hariharan, Milind Ingle, Santosh & Pratima	6:50
6.	"A B C D E F G H I"	Hariharan, Udit Narayan, Shankar Mahadevan, Hema Sardesai & Saif Ali Khan	4:36
7.	"Sunoji Dulhan Ek Bat Sunoji"	Roop Kumar Rathod, Pratima Rao, Udit Narayan, Kavita Krishnamurthy & Sonu Nigam	12:21
Total length:			44:16

At the 2000 Zee Cine Awards, Raamlaxman received a nomination for Best Music Director. At the same event, he won the award for Best Background Score.

=== Critical reception ===
Savera R Someshwar of Rediff.com said "..It is time for Barjatya to look out for a new music director. Even the lyrics – barring "Maare Hidwa Ma Naache Mor" and "Mayya Yashoda" – are banal...".

=== Charts and sales ===
The music topped the charts on several platforms in India. According to Box Office India, the soundtrack of Hum Saath-Saath Hain went on to sell 18 lakh (1.8 million) units, becoming the twelfth best-selling album of the year.

== Release ==
Hum Saath-Saath Hain was released earlier but the music director Raamlaxman took time to check the soundtrack album for the second time to not make any mistake. Following all the post-production, cinematography, choreography and other things were completed, the film finally hit the theatre screens on 5 November 1999 during Diwali. It became the first Bollywood film to be played in Canadian theatres, with six screenings in Toronto. Eros Entertainment released the film on over 60 screens in North America, the biggest opening for any film then. The film was also dubbed in Telugu and released with the title Premanuragam. Hum Saath-Saath Hain was later made available on Netflix and Zee5.

== Reception ==
=== Critical reception ===
Anupama Chopra of India Today noted, "A time-warped patriarchal fantasy, but somehow HSSH glows with Barjatya's conviction. Despite the diabetic sweetness, it has some wonderfully crafted moments. It's maudlin and regressive but he believes in it. And at least partially, he makes you believe in it too."

Savera R Someshwar of Rediff.com stated, "Barjatya's film is pure escapism, very feel-good. While you are ensconced with the moving images, you smile, laugh, feel sad, and maybe even a little angry. Hum Saath-Saath Hain is an enjoyable experience, especially if you contain yourself from comparing it to Hum Aapke Hain Koun..!"

Alok Kumar of PlanetBollywood.com wrote, "Hum Saath-Saath Hain is repetitive, sickeningly sweet, and sappy. Though, the performances were pretty good from the whole cast. If you're a Barjatya fan, you should watch this, as it's almost guaranteed you will love it."

=== Box office ===
Hum Saath-Saath Hain became the highest-grossing film of the year, with a worldwide gross of ₹81.71 crore (US$18.98 million). It became one of the biggest blockbusters of the decade. It is one of the top earners of the decade in India and at the foreign box office. When adjusted for inflation, Hum Saath-Saath Hain is still among the highest grossers worldwide. Rediff.com termed Hum Saath-Saath Hain, a "Super Hit" and the "biggest hit" of 1999. The film is also among the highest grossing Diwali releases in India.

== Accolades ==
Award (Note: Awards, festivals and organizations are in alphabetical order.)	Date of ceremony (Note: Date is linked to the article about the awards held that year, wherever possible.)	Category	Recipient	Result	Ref.
Filmfare Awards	13 February 2000	Best Supporting Actor	Mohnish Behl	Nominated	
International Indian Film Academy Awards	24 June 2000	Best Story	Sooraj Barjatya	Nominated	
International Indian Film Academy Awards	24 June 2000	Best Makeup	Jayanti Shevale	Won	
People's Choice Awards India	2000	Best Supporting Actor	Mohnish Behl	Nominated	
People's Choice Awards India	2000	Best Supporting Actor	Saif Ali Khan	Nominated	
People's Choice Awards India	2000	Best Supporting Actress	Reema Lagoo	Nominated	
Zee Cine Awards	11 March 2000	Best Director	Sooraj Barjatya	Nominated	
Zee Cine Awards	11 March 2000	Best Actor - Male	Salman Khan	Nominated	
Zee Cine Awards	11 March 2000	Best Actor in a Supporting Role – Male	Mohnish Behl	Nominated	
Zee Cine Awards	11 March 2000	Best Actor in a Supporting Role – Female	Neelam Kothari	Nominated	
Zee Cine Awards	11 March 2000	Best Actor in a Comic Role	Saif Ali Khan	Nominated	
Zee Cine Awards	11 March 2000	Best Music Director	Raamlaxman	Nominated	
Zee Cine Awards	11 March 2000	Best Choreography	Jay Borade for "Maiyya Yashoda"	Nominated	
Zee Cine Awards	11 March 2000	Best Editing	Mukhtar Ahmed	Won	
Zee Cine Awards	11 March 2000	Best Art Direction	Bijon Dasgupta	Nominated	
Zee Cine Awards	11 March 2000	Best Background Score	Raamlaxman	Won	
Zee Cine Awards	11 March 2000	Best Sound Recording	Narinder Singh	Nominated	
Zee Cine Awards	11 March 2000	Best Re-Recording	Kuldip Sood	Nominated	

== Legacy ==
Hum Saath-Saath Hain remains one of the most popular family drama film of Indian cinema. It is also considered among the best ensemble cast films by Filmfare. India Today added it in its list of "10 evergreen Hindi films". The Indian Express named it Barjatiya's one of the "most family-friendly" flicks. The film is also listed among the best films made on siblings relationship.

Navya Kharbanda of Hindustan Times termed it a "cinematic masterpiece" and stated, "The film continues to captivate audiences with its themes of family bonds, love, and traditions." Aakriti Anand of Filmfare stated that the film justified its title "to the fullest" and termed it an "out-and-out family entertainer". Vibha Maru from India Today noted, "The film set a template of how family films are to be made. Hum Saath Saath Hain was also a rare film that saw so many popular actors together on the big screen; something that is hard to imagine today." The songs of the film are highly popular. Songs like "Sunoji Dulhan", "Mhare Hiwda" and "Maiyya Yashoda" have become synonym with the wedding, monsoon and festive seasons. Actor Vicky Kaushal admitted to being a fan of the film and said that it is "etched in his mind". The film also has over 1.9 billion views on YouTube.

== See also ==
- List of highest-grossing Hindi films
- List of Hindi films of 1999
- List of films shot in Rajasthan
