= Hum Aapke Dil Mein Rehte Hain =

- Theatrical release poster
- Directed by: Satish Kaushik
- Written by: Jainendra Jain
- Based on: Pavithra Bandham (1996) by Muthyala Subbaiah
- Produced by: D. Ramanaidu
- Starring: Anil Kapoor; Kajol
- Cinematography: Kabir Lal
- Edited by: E. M. Madhavan; Chaitanya Tanna; Marthand K. Venkatesh
- Music by: Anu Malik
- Production company: Suresh Productions
- Distributed by: Melody International
- Release date: 22 January 1999
- Running time: 164 minutes
- Country: India
- Language: Hindi
- Budget: ₹6.25 crore
- Box office: ₹36.65 crore

Hum Aapke Dil Mein Rehte Hain (transl. I Live in Your Heart) is a 1999 Indian Hindi-language romantic drama film directed by Satish Kaushik and produced by D. Ramanaidu for his production company Suresh Productions. It stars Anil Kapoor and Kajol, with Anupam Kher, Shakti Kapoor and Parmeet Sethi in supporting roles. Written by Jainendra Jain, the film tells the story of Megha (Kajol), who enters into a one-year contract marriage with industrialist Vijay (Anil Kapoor).

Hum Aapke Dil Mein Rehte Hain serves as a remake of Telugu-language film Pavitra Bandham (1996). With a budget of ₹6.25 crore (equivalent to ₹27 crore or US$2.8 million in 2023), principal photography took place in India and Switzerland and finished in December 1998. Kabir Lal served as the cinematographer, while E.M. Madhavan, Chaitanya Tanna and Marthand K. Venkatesh edited the film. The music was composed by Anu Malik and the lyrics were written by Sameer.

Hum Aapke Dil Mein Rehte Hain was released on 22 January 1999 and emerged as a commercial blockbuster, with a total gross of ₹36.65 crore (equivalent to ₹157 crore or US$16 million in 2023) worldwide. It received mixed-to-positive critical reviews, with mostly praise directed towards its story and Kajol's performance. For her portrayal, Kajol was nominated for the Best Actress category at the Filmfare Awards, the International Indian Film Academy Awards, the Screen Awards, and the Zee Cine Awards.

== Plot ==
Vishwanath is a multi-millionaire industrialist, living with his only son, Vijay. After Vijay completed his education in the United States, Vishwanath forces him to get married but Vijay refuses to, saying that he still wants to be single. Disappointed, Vishwanath (who is suffering from diabetes) tries to convince his son with sweets; it makes Vijay immediately agrees to his demand. Megha, a hardworking girl struggling to support her family, is Vishwanath's personal assistant in his office. Vishwanath asks Megha to quit her job and marry his son, but she refuses when she hears Vijay wants the marriage to be on a contract basis for a year and, if he does not fall in love with his wife in that duration, the marriage will be annulled and Megha will get money as a return. However, Megha's family is in dire financial straits and, so, she has to reconsider this offer.

Vijay and Megha are married. After the marriage, they become friendly with each other and Megha goes out of her way to look after Vijay after he is in a car accident. At the end of the year, however, Vijay decides to annul the marriage, as had been agreed upon, and he regards her as a friend. Megha leaves Vijay and returns home. After the separation, Vijay seems to be enjoying himself; but slowly and eventually, he starts to feel regret after he found the facts that she gets social sanctions for the contract.

In order to support herself, Megha starts a job in a new company; to her surprise, when the company's managing director arrives, he turns out to be Vijay. He later confesses to her that he is a changed person and wants her back. But, even after repeated persuasion, she disagrees because her faith in him has been shattered. Vijay continues to pursue her. Later, Megha finds out that she is pregnant with Vijay's child. Near the completion of her pregnancy, she along with her family then hold a ceremony for the well-being of her to-be-born child. In the ceremony, which Vishwanath and Vijay attends, Megha reveals that the latter to be her husband and tells all the guests about the marriage-contract. An argument follows; Vijay and his father walk out, followed by all the guests.

As a last ditch effort, Vijay's friends make a plan to lure Megha to meet him again. His friends tell her that troublemakers Khairati Lal and Yeshwant Kumar, who had once attempted to kill Vijay in the car accident, have escaped from prison. They are out looking for Vijay, who had fired them from his father's company for cheating and fraud.

Megha gets anxious and tries to reach Vijay as soon as possible. On the way, she learns that the whole thing was a set-up, when she caught one of Vijay's friends call him by a payphone. Enraged, Megha heads to Vijay's house to criticize him for this shameless act. Unbeknownst to both Megha and Vijay however, the aforementioned criminals arrive in Vijay's house to kill him. They beat up Vijay, but he soon overpowers them. Eventually though, Yeshwant stabs Vijay in the stomach with a broken wine bottle thrice, and Khairati with a large knife in his back twice. As soon as they hear Megha's footsteps however, they flee the scene, leaving Vijay seriously injured.

As soon as Megha meets Vijay, she angrily berates him for playing a prank on her and orders him to never see her again. However, as she turns to leave, Vijay staggers and takes out the broken wine bottle from his stomach, causing blood to pour from the wound. Megha upon seeing the wound, realizes Vijay really was attacked and runs toward him. However, she slips and falls down, and goes into labor. Vijay, summoning up all his strength, takes Megha to the hospital. There, he is treated for his injuries and she delivers a healthy baby boy. Megha and Vijay recover and get reconciled.

== Cast ==
The cast is listed below.

- Anil Kapoor as Vijay
- Kajol as Megha
- Gracy Singh as Maya
- Sudha Chandran as Manju
- Anupam Kher as Mr. Vishwanath, Vijay's father
- Rakesh Bedi as Salim
- Satish Kaushik as German, Vijay's secretary
- Adi Irani as Manju's husband
- Shakti Kapoor as Khairati Lal
- Smita Jaykar as Megha's mother
- Sadhu Meher as Badri Prasad
- Raju Shrestha as Sudhakar
- Parmeet Sethi as Yeshwant Kumar
- Mink Brar as Anita
- Johnny Lever as Sunny
- Dinesh Hingoo as Pandit Ramprasad

Kumar Sanu, Anuradha Paudwal and Anu Malik made special appearances in the song "Kasam Se Kasam Se".

== Production ==
The film is a remake of Muthyala Subbaiah's 1996 Telugu-language film Pavitra Bandham, and it marks the producer D. Ramanaidu's return to Hindi cinema after a long hiatus; he had last produced Taqdeerwala in 1995. In an interview with Rediff.com, Ramanaidu said that his involvement in the project was a way to prove his mettle as a producer in the Hindi film industry: "As far as Telugu films are concerned, I have achieved whatever I wanted to. I want to hit the jackpot in Bollywood with this film." Anil Kapoor was cast as the antagonist Vijay and Anupam Kher as his father, Vishwanath. According to Kapoor, the role had changed his screen image, and he later stated that he took the part to avoid typecasting. Meanwhile, Kajol was cast as the film's protagonist Megha, her first such role. Interviewed by The Telegraph, she stated that her role "seemed like a great character on paper, but [it] didn't translate well on screen".

Satish Kaushik was suggested by Kapoor, who has collaborated with him in several films, including Mr. India (1987), Joshilaay (1989) and Ram Lakhan (1989), to direct this film. Kaushik compared it with his previous directorial ventures—Roop Ki Rani Choron Ka Raja (1993) and Prem (1995)—and found Hum Aapke Dil Mein Rehte Hain "very different", explaining that it "emphasised feelings and that the accent here was on treatment"; for instance, the former was dominant with costume and the latter was based on reincarnation. He said, "I do not resort to any gimmicks in [Hum Aapke Dil Mein Rehte Hain]. I'm not playing with camera angles or juggling shots. You will not find 50 dances here... My film has been set against a contemporary backdrop." Jainendra Jain and Bhupati Raja wrote the dialogue and story, respectively.

Principal photography started in Hyderabad and handed by Kabir Lal. Saroj Khan and Chinni Prakash were the choreographers, while Raja was the action director. Its production design was completed by Sharmishta Roy. Some songs were recorded at the Hotel de Rougemont in Switzerland. After filming finished around December 1998, it was edited by E.M. Madhava, Chaitanya Tanna and Marthand K. Venkatesh.

== Soundtrack ==
Hum Aapke Dil Mein Rehte Hain

Soundtrack album by Anu Malik
- Released: 21 December 1998
- Genre: Feature film soundtrack
- Length: 49:40
- Label: T-Series
- Producer: Anu Malik

Anu Malik chronology
Ishq (1997)	Hum Aapke Dil Mein Rehte Hain (1998)	Refugee (2000)

The soundtrack for Hum Aapke Dil Mein Rehte Hain was completed by Anu Malik and the lyrics were written by Sameer. It contains nine songs, with vocals performed by Kumar Sanu, Anuradha Paudwal, Udit Narayan, Alka Yagnik, Sonu Nigam, Hema Sardesai, Rahul Seth, Anu Malik, Abhijeet Bhattacharya, Shankar Mahadevan and Anuradha Sriram. The album was released on 21 December 1998 by T-Series.

Hum Aapke Dil Mein Rehte Hain (Original Motion Picture Soundtrack)
No.	Title	Singer(s)	Length
1.	"Hum Aapke Dil Mein Rehte Hain"	Kumar Sanu, Anuradha Paudwal	5:22
2.	"Zara Aankhon Mein Kaajal"	Kumar Sanu, Anuradha Paudwal	6:11
3.	"Chhup Gaya"	Udit Narayan, Alka Yagnik	6:42
4.	"Dhingtara Dhingtara"	Sonu Nigam, Hema Sardesai, Rahul Seth	6:14
5.	"Kasam Se Kasam Se"	Anuradha Paudwal, Kumar Sanu	5:53
6.	"Hai Hai Hai Jata Hai Kahan"	Anu Malik, Hema Sardesai	5:45
7.	"Papa Main Papa Ban Gaya"	Abhijeet Bhattacharya, Shankar Mahadevan, Anuradha Sriram	5:48
8.	"Patni Pati Ke Liye"	Shankar Mahadewan	5:35
9.	"Hum Aapke Dil Mein Rehte Hain" (Female Version)	Anuradha Paudwal	2:10
Total length:			49:40

== Release ==
Produced by Suresh Productions and distributed by Melody International, Hum Aapke Dil Mein Rehte Hain was released on 22 January 1999 and ran at theatres for 25 weeks. It faced strong competition from Rishi Kapoor's Aa Ab Laut Chalen, Gulzar's Hu Tu Tu and Shakeel Norani's Bade Dilwala, all of which were released on the same day. The film opened to a wide audience, with 190 screens across India, and grossed ₹57 lakh (equivalent to ₹2.4 crore or US$250,000 in 2023) on its opening day. Hum Aapke Dil Mein Rehte Hain earned ₹1.84 crore (equivalent to ₹7.9 crore or US$820,000 in 2023) on its first weekend and ₹36.4 crore (US$3.8 million) after its first week. Box Office India estimated the film's total gross at ₹29 crore (equivalent to ₹125 crore or US$13 million in 2023) in India and $1.8 million overseas, and concluded its final commercial performance with the verdict "super hit". The film thus emerged as one of the highest-grossing female-led films of the year.

A DVD version was released on 17 July 2007 in a single-disc pack.

=== Critical reception ===
Hum Aapke Dil Mein Rehte Hain addressed the issue of prenuptial agreement. It received mixed-to-positive reviews, with critics praising its story, melodramatic climax and the performances, mostly that from Kajol. Sharmila Taliculam, writing for Rediff.com, described the film as a "usual run-of-the-mill story", noting its "sprinkling of drama, comedy, fight [and] romance". She opined that Kajol "manages her role well", with "her eyes [giving] good effect in many scenes", and thought her chemistry with Kapoor managed to "save the film from going downhill in a rush". Taliculam argued that Kapoor's portrayal, which she found "par excellence", would remind the audiences of his roles in Lamhe (1991), Mr. Bechara (1996) and Judaai (1997). A critic from Bollywood Hungama said, "Hum Aapke Dil Mein Rehte Hain is a good enough film if you go for that kind of family tear-jerker." K. N. Vijiyan of the New Straits Times shared similar thoughts, saying, "[It] will be a treat for those who love Anil Kapoor and Kajol, and for those who want something different." In a column for the same publication, he added that the story is "quite refreshing". Mukhtar Anjoom from Deccan Herald wrote that "Kajol excels. She combines grace and intensity with uncommon talent. Suave Anil is as sleek and convincing as ever. Anu Malik’s music is melodious. The ‘comedy’ of Satish Kaushik, Johnny Lever and Rakesh Bedi is unbearable — the clatter sounds like a herd of asses braying at a reunion party. Except for this, the film is clean and enjoyable."

Conversely, Mukhtar Anjoom of The Times of India saw that the comedic scene make the film "clean and enjoyable". Deepa Gahlot thought that the film's story was inspired by Indian mythologies and folk tales. In Eena Meena Deeka: The Story of Hindi Film Comedy, Sanjit Narwekar said that Kaushik had proved himself as "a leading director" with the film's success.

=== Accolades ===
Award (Note: Awards, festivals and organizations are in alphabetical order.)	Date of ceremony (Note: Date is linked to the article about the awards held that year, wherever possible.)	Category	Recipient(s)	Result	Ref.
Filmfare Awards	13 February 2000	Best Actress	Kajol	Nominated	
International Indian Film Academy Awards	24 June 2000	Best Actress	Kajol	Nominated	
International Indian Film Academy Awards	24 June 2000	Best Story	Bhupathi Raja	Nominated	
Screen Awards	23 January 2000	Best Film	Hum Aapke Dil Mein Rehte Hain	Nominated	
Screen Awards	23 January 2000	Best Director	Satish Kaushik	Nominated	
Screen Awards	23 January 2000	Best Actress	Kajol	Nominated	
Screen Awards	23 January 2000	Best Supporting Actor	Anupam Kher	Nominated	
Screen Awards	23 January 2000	Best Dialogue	Jainendra Jain	Nominated	
Screen Awards	23 January 2000	Best Music Director	Anu Malik	Nominated	
Zee Cine Awards	11 March 2000	Best Actor – Female	Kajol	Nominated	
Zee Cine Awards	11 March 2000	Best Actor in a Supporting Role – Male	Anupam Kher	Nominated	
Zee Cine Awards	11 March 2000	Best Actor in a Comic Role	Johnny Lever	Nominated	
Zee Cine Awards	11 March 2000	Best Music Director	Anu Malik	Nominated	
Zee Cine Awards	11 March 2000	Best Editing	Chaitanya Tanna	Nominated	
