= Hum Dil De Chuke Sanam =

1999 Indian film by Sanjay Leela Bhansali

- Film poster
- Directed by: Sanjay Leela Bhansali
- Screenplay by: Kanan Mani; Kenneth Phillipps; Sanjay Leela Bhansali
- Story by: Pratap Karvat; Sanjay Leela Bhansali
- Based on: Shetal ne Kathe by Jhaverchand Meghani
- Produced by: Sanjay Leela Bhansali
- Starring: Salman Khan; Ajay Devgn; Aishwarya Rai
- Narrated by: Salman Khan
- Cinematography: Anil Mehta
- Edited by: Bela Segal
- Music by: Songs: Ismail Darbar; Background Score: Anjan Biswas
- Production company: Bhansali Productions
- Distributed by: Sony Pictures Networks; Eros International
- Release date: 18 June 1999
- Running time: 188 minutes
- Country: India
- Language: Hindi
- Budget: ₹16 crore
- Box office: ₹51.38 crore

Hum Dil De Chuke Sanam, released internationally as Straight From the Heart, is a 1999 Indian Hindi-language romantic drama musical film directed, co-written, and produced by Sanjay Leela Bhansali. The film stars Salman Khan, Ajay Devgn, and Aishwarya Rai. Based on Jhaverchand Meghani's play Shetal ne Kathe, the film narrates the story of a newlywed man who discovers that his wife is in love with another man and decides to unite them. The film has also been described as a loose adaptation of Maitreyi Devi's Bengali novel Na Hanyate, although the film itself does not credit it as a source. Musician Adnan Sami has argued that the film is based on the Pakistani movie Sargam, a musical romance released in 1995, and his only lead role in cinema.

It was filmed throughout the Gujarat-Rajasthan border region, in addition to Budapest, Hungary, which was used to represent Italy. The film premiered in the Indian Panorama section at the 1999 International Film Festival of India. The Bengali film Neel Akasher Chandni was inspired by this movie.

The film was a commercial blockbuster and emerged as one of the highest-grossing Indian films of the year, earning ₹510 million (US$5.3 million). It received predominantly positive reviews from critics. Hum Dil De Chuke Sanam received 17 nominations at the 45th Filmfare Awards, including Best Actor (Khan and Devgn), and won 7 awards, including Best Film, Best Director (Bhansali), Best Actress (Rai), and Best Male Playback Singer (Udit Narayan).

== Plot ==
Nandini is the spirited daughter of Pundit Darbar, a revered maestro of Indian classical music residing in a sprawling ancestral estate in Rajasthan. Sameer, an eccentric Indo-Italian musician, arrives at the household seeking an apprenticeship under the Pundit to master classical vocal intricacies. Initially, Sameer's unorthodox temperament clashes with Nandini after his accommodation forces her to relocate within the mansion. However, through a series of playful domestic exchanges during festive family gatherings, the two fall deeply in love.

Their secret romance is exposed when Pundit Darbar catches them rehearsing wedding vows. Enraged by the violation of his patriarchal authority and the compromise of family honor, the Pundit enters a vow of musical silence and summarily banishes Sameer from the estate. He forces Sameer to pledge never to contact Nandini again, having already arranged her marriage to Vanraj, a stoic and deeply principled lawyer who had become infatuated with Nandini during a previous family wedding. Devastated, Sameer relents and repatriates to Italy, though he immediately begins sending letters imploring Nandini to join him; these communications are intercepted and withheld by her family. Following a suicide attempt, a despondent Nandini yields to familial pressure and marries Vanraj. On their wedding night, she acts with cold detachment and rejects Vanraj's attempts to consummate the marriage, refusing to offer an explanation for her emotional withdrawal.

The marital impasse breaks when Vanraj discovers Sameer's hidden letters in Nandini's possession. Though initially furious, Vanraj undergoes a profound moral transition, concluding that his ethical duty as a husband is to reunite his unrequited bride with her true love. Securing his parents' reluctant consent, Vanraj takes Nandini to Italy to locate Sameer. Their international search is plagued by bureaucratic dead ends and logistical failures. During a violent street mugging, Nandini is shot in the arm; Vanraj's fierce protectiveness and selfless care during her hospitalization and subsequent convalescence trigger a profound shift in her perception of him.

Through Sameer’s mother, Vanraj finally traces his rival to a prestigious opera venue on the night of Sameer's debut concert. Fulfilling his promise, Vanraj brings Nandini to the venue, bids her a final farewell, and walks away heartbroken to return to India alone.

Upon reuniting with Sameer backstage, Nandini experiences a profound psychological realization. She contrasts Sameer's passionate but distant infatuation with the unwavering, sacrificial devotion Vanraj exhibited throughout their journey. Realizing that her emotional alignment has radically shifted from romantic obsession to a mature, profound love for her husband, Nandini apologizes to a devastated Sameer and terminates their relationship. Recognizing that she no longer harbors her former affection, Sameer concedes and lets her go. Nandini runs back to the city's stone bridge to intercept Vanraj before his departure. She confesses her love, declaring that she cannot live without him. Vanraj joyfully accepts her, sealing their permanent reconciliation by tying a mangalsutra around her neck.

== Cast ==
- Salman Khan as Sameer "Sam" Rossellini
- Ajay Devgan as Advocate Vanraj, Nandini's husband.
- Aishwarya Rai as Nandini Darbar, Vanraj's wife.
- Vikram Gokhale as Pundit Darbar, Nandini's father.
- Smita Jaykar as Amrita Darbar, Nandini's mother.
- Helen as Sameer's mother (special appearance)
- Rekha Rao as Kamna
- Zohra Sehgal as the grandmother
- Rajeev Verma as Advocate Vikramjeet
- Vinay Pathak as Tarun
- Sheeba Chaddha as Anupama
- Ghanashyam Nayak as Vitthal
- Jameel Khan as Nimesh
- Kenneth Desai as Bhairav
- Meenakshi Verma as Pushpa
- Preeti Koppikar as Radha
- Divya Jagdale as Sanjukta, Vanraj's sister.
- Kanu Gill as Vanraj's mother
- Dimple Inamdar as Shilpa
- Akash Karnataki as Bharat

== Soundtrack ==
Hum Dil De Chuke Sanam

Soundtrack album by Ismail Darbar
- Released: 30 April 1999 (Digital Release); 18 June 1999 (Film)
- Genre: Feature film soundtrack
- Length: 54:03
- Language: Hindi
- Label: T-Series

Ismail Darbar chronology
Hum Dil De Chuke Sanam (1999)	Tera Jadoo Chal Gayaa (2000)

The soundtrack had lyrics by Mehboob Kotwal and music by Ismail Darbar. Voices on the soundtrack include those of Kavita Krishnamurthy, Alka Yagnik, Kumar Sanu, Udit Narayan, Hariharan, Vinod Rathod, Sultan Khan, Shankar Mahadevan, KK, and others. It received nine Filmfare Award nominations in the music and singing categories and produced some winners as well. According to the Indian trade website, box office India the film's soundtrack sold 3.5 million units sold, this films soundtrack was the third highest selling album of the year. The song "Albela Sajan" was reinterpreted in the movie Bajirao Mastani (2015), which was also directed by Sanjay Leela Bhansali. Bhansali composed the soundtrack of Bajirao Mastani as well. An unlisted track "Pritam Gaye Pardes" sung by Karsan Sagathia frequently features in the movie.

=== Track listing ===
Hum Dil De Chuke Sanam
No.	Title	Singer	Length
1.	"Chand Chupa Badal Mein"	Udit Narayan; Alka Yagnik	5:46
2.	"Nimbooda"	Kavita Krishnamurthy; Karsan Sargathia	6:23
3.	"Aankhon Ki Gustakhiyan"	Kavita Krishnamurthy; Kumar Sanu	5:00
4.	"Man Mohini"	Shankar Mahadevan	2:26
5.	"Jhonka Hawa Ka" (Raga Yaman Kalyan)	Hariharan; Kavita Krishnamurthy	5:46
6.	"Dholi Taro Dhol Baaje"	Kavita Krishnamurthy; Vinod Rathod; Karsan Sagathia	6:16
7.	"Love Theme"	Shankar Mahadevan; Kavita Krishnamurthy	2:11
8.	"Tadap Tadap"	K.K.; Dominique Cerejo	6:36
9.	"Albela Sajan" (Raga Ahir Bhairav)	Sultan Khan; Shankar Mahadevan; Kavita Krishnamurthy	3:20
10.	"Kaipoche"	Damayanti Bardai; Jyotsna Hardikar; K.K.; Shankar Mahadevan	5:03
11.	"Hum Dil De Chuke Sanam"	Kavita Krishnamurthy; Mohammed Salamat; Dominique Cerejo	6:45
Total length:			55:32

== Reception ==
Hum Dil De Chuke Sanam was well received by most critics — especially for its emotional content, cinematography and soundtrack — as well as the performances of the lead actors and a surprising performance by guest star Helen.

Ken Eisner said "this three-hour spectacular is stuffed with songs, romance, comedy, devotional material, and color-soaked dance numbers that are huge even by Hindi standards." Michael Dequina writing for TheMovieReport.com said of the three leads "Rai, in a luminous, award-winning performance (largely considered her big dramatic breakthrough—and justifiably so), fills in the conflicted emotional shades that Khan fails to bring with his one-dimensional presence; and Devgn's soulful subtlety does its job in suggesting Sameer to be a more formidable romantic adversary than viewers would see him as being." The reviewer for Filmfare felt it was a "once-in-a-decade type of extravaganza" and wrote, "Cinematographically, the movie is flawless and by virtue of this fact alone, a must-see. It aims at capturing poetry on screen without becoming pretentious. The music by Ismail Darbar is simply enchanting. The film juxtaposes Indian thematic content with exotic foreign locales."

A huge hit at the Indian box office, Hum Dil De Chuke Sanam became the third highest-grossing Bollywood film of 1999 with over $20 million. It also did well at the foreign box office, with ₹ 85 million.

== Accolades ==
Award (Note: Awards, festivals and organizations are in alphabetical order.)	Date of ceremony (Note: Date is linked to the article about the awards held that year, wherever possible.)	Category	Recipient(s)	Result	Ref.
Bollywood Movie Awards (Note: as Zee Gold Bollywood Awards.)	8 June 2000	Best Director	Sanjay Leela Bhansali	Won	
Bollywood Movie Awards	8 June 2000	Best Actress (Critics)	Aishwarya Rai	Won	
Bollywood Movie Awards	8 June 2000	Best Male Playback Singer	Kumar Sanu for "Aankhon Ki Gustakhiyan"	Won	
Bollywood Movie Awards	8 June 2000	Best Story	Pratap Karvat, Sanjay Leela Bhansali	Won	
Bollywood Movie Awards	8 June 2000	Best Screenplay	Kenneth Philips, Sanjay Leela Bhansali	Won	
Bollywood Movie Awards	8 June 2000	Best Cinematography	Anil Mehta	Won	
Bollywood Movie Awards	8 June 2000	Best Costume Designer	Neeta Lulla	Won	
Filmfare Awards	13 February 2000	Best Film	Hum Dil De Chuke Sanam	Won	
Filmfare Awards	13 February 2000	Best Director	Sanjay Leela Bhansali	Won	
Filmfare Awards	13 February 2000	Best Actor	Ajay Devgn	Nominated	
Filmfare Awards	13 February 2000	Best Actor	Salman Khan	Nominated	
Filmfare Awards	13 February 2000	Best Actress	Aishwarya Rai	Won	
Filmfare Awards	13 February 2000	Best Music Director	Ismail Darbar	Nominated	
Filmfare Awards	13 February 2000	R. D. Burman Award	Ismail Darbar	Won	
Filmfare Awards	13 February 2000	Best Background Score	Anjan Biswas	Won	
Filmfare Awards	13 February 2000	Best Lyricist	Mehboob for "Aankhon Ki Gustakhiyan"	Nominated	
Filmfare Awards	13 February 2000	Best Lyricist	Mehboob for "Tadap Tadap"	Nominated	
Filmfare Awards	13 February 2000	Best Male Playback Singer	KK for "Tadap Tadap"	Nominated	
Filmfare Awards	13 February 2000	Best Male Playback Singer	Kumar Sanu for "Aankhon Ki Gustakhiyan"	Nominated	
Filmfare Awards	13 February 2000	Best Male Playback Singer	Udit Narayan for "Chand Chupa Badal Mein"	Won	
Filmfare Awards	13 February 2000	Best Female Playback Singer	Alka Yagnik for "Chand Chupa Badal Mein"	Nominated	
Filmfare Awards	13 February 2000	Best Female Playback Singer	Kavita Krishnamurti for "Hum Dil De Chuke Sanam"	Nominated	
Filmfare Awards	13 February 2000	Best Female Playback Singer	Kavita Krishnamurti for "Nimbooda"	Nominated	
Filmfare Awards	13 February 2000	Best Choreography	Saroj Khan for "Nimbooda"	Won	
Filmfare Awards	13 February 2000	Best Art Direction	Nitin Chandrakant Desai	Won	
International Indian Film Academy Awards	24 June 2000	Best Film	Hum Dil De Chuke Sanam	Won	
International Indian Film Academy Awards	24 June 2000	Best Director	Sanjay Leela Bhansali	Won	
International Indian Film Academy Awards	24 June 2000	Best Story	Pratap Karvat, Sanjay Leela Bhansali	Won	
International Indian Film Academy Awards	24 June 2000	Best Screenplay	Sanjay Leela Bhansali	Won	
International Indian Film Academy Awards	24 June 2000	Best Dialogue	Amrik Gill	Won	
International Indian Film Academy Awards	24 June 2000	Best Cinematography	Anil Mehta	Won	
International Indian Film Academy Awards	24 June 2000	Best Actor	Ajay Devgn	Nominated	
International Indian Film Academy Awards	24 June 2000	Best Actor	Salman Khan	Nominated	
International Indian Film Academy Awards	24 June 2000	Best Actress	Aishwarya Rai	Won	
International Indian Film Academy Awards	24 June 2000	Best Music Director	Ismail Darbar	Nominated	
International Indian Film Academy Awards	24 June 2000	Best Lyricist	Mehboob for "Aankhon Ki Gustakhiyan"	Nominated	
International Indian Film Academy Awards	24 June 2000	Best Lyricist	Mehboob for "Chand Chupa Badal Mein"	Nominated	
International Indian Film Academy Awards	24 June 2000	Best Lyricist	Mehboob for "Tadap Tadap"	Nominated	
International Indian Film Academy Awards	24 June 2000	Best Male Playback Singer	KK for "Tadap Tadap"	Nominated	
International Indian Film Academy Awards	24 June 2000	Best Male Playback Singer	Kumar Sanu for "Aankhon Ki Gustakhiyan"	Nominated	
International Indian Film Academy Awards	24 June 2000	Best Male Playback Singer	Udit Narayan for "Chand Chupa Badal Mein"	Won	
International Indian Film Academy Awards	24 June 2000	Best Female Playback Singer	Kavita Krishnamurti for "Aankhon Ki Gustakhiyan"	Nominated	
International Indian Film Academy Awards	24 June 2000	Best Female Playback Singer	Kavita Krishnamurti for "Hum Dil De Chuke Sanam"	Nominated	
International Indian Film Academy Awards	24 June 2000	Best Choreography	Saroj Khan for "Nimbooda"	Won	
International Indian Film Academy Awards	24 June 2000	Best Sound Recording	Jitendra Arya	Won	
International Indian Film Academy Awards	24 June 2000	Best Sound Re-Recording	Suresh Kathuria	Won	
National Film Awards	18 September 2000	Best Music Direction	Ismail Darbar	Won	
National Film Awards	18 September 2000	Best Choreography	Vaibhavi Merchant and Sameer–Arsh Tanna for "Dholi Taro"	Won	
National Film Awards	18 September 2000	Best Cinematography	Cameraman: Anil Mehta; Laboratory Processing: Adlabs	Won	
National Film Awards	18 September 2000	Best Production Design	Nitin Chandrakant Desai	Won	
Screen Awards	23 January 2000	Best Film	Hum Dil De Chuke Sanam	Won	
Screen Awards	23 January 2000	Best Director	Sanjay Leela Bhansali	Won	
Screen Awards	23 January 2000	Best Story	Pratap Karvat, Sanjay Leela Bhansali	Nominated	
Screen Awards	23 January 2000	Best Screenplay	Kenneth Philips, Sanjay Leela Bhansali	Won	
Screen Awards	23 January 2000	Best Dialogue	Amrik Gill	Won	
Screen Awards	23 January 2000	Best Cinematography	Anil Mehta	Won	
Screen Awards	23 January 2000	Best Actress	Aishwarya Rai	Won	
Screen Awards	23 January 2000	Best Actor	Ajay Devgn	Nominated	
Screen Awards	23 January 2000	Best Supporting Actress	Smita Jaykar	Nominated	
Screen Awards	23 January 2000	Best Music Director	Ismail Darbar	Nominated	
Screen Awards	23 January 2000	Best Lyricist	Mehboob for "Aankhon Ki Gustakhiyan"	Nominated	
Screen Awards	23 January 2000	Best Male Playback Singer	KK for "Tadap Tadap"	Nominated	
Screen Awards	23 January 2000	Best Male Playback Singer	Udit Narayan for "Chand Chupa Badal Mein"	Nominated	
Screen Awards	23 January 2000	Best Female Playback Singer	Kavita Krishnamurti for "Hum Dil De Chuke Sanam"	Won	
Screen Awards	23 January 2000	Best Choreography	Saroj Khan for "Nimbooda"	Won	
Screen Awards	23 January 2000	Best Art Direction	Nitin Chandrakant Desai	Won	
Screen Awards	23 January 2000	Best Costumes	Shabina Khan	Nominated	
Screen Awards	23 January 2000	Best Special Effects	Ramesh Meer	Won	
Zee Cine Awards	11 March 2000	Best Film	Hum Dil De Chuke Sanam	Won	
Zee Cine Awards	11 March 2000	Best Director	Sanjay Leela Bhansali	Won	
Zee Cine Awards	11 March 2000	Best Screenplay	Sanjay Leela Bhansali	Nominated	
Zee Cine Awards	11 March 2000	Best Story	Pratap Karvat, Sanjay Leela Bhansali	Won	
Zee Cine Awards	11 March 2000	Best Dialogue	Amrik Gill	Won	
Zee Cine Awards	11 March 2000	Best Cinematography	Anil Mehta	Won	
Zee Cine Awards	11 March 2000	Best Actor – Male	Ajay Devgn	Nominated	
Zee Cine Awards	11 March 2000	Best Actor – Female	Aishwarya Rai	Won	
Zee Cine Awards	11 March 2000	Lux Face of the Year (Note: also for Taal.)	Aishwarya Rai	Won	
Zee Cine Awards	11 March 2000	Best Music Director	Ismail Darbar	Nominated	
Zee Cine Awards	11 March 2000	Best Background Score	Anjan Biswas	Nominated	
Zee Cine Awards	11 March 2000	Best Lyricist	Mehboob for "Chand Chupa Badal Mein"	Nominated	
Zee Cine Awards	11 March 2000	Best Playback Singer – Male	Udit Narayan for "Chand Chupa Badal Mein"	Won	
Zee Cine Awards	11 March 2000	Best Playback Singer – Female	Kavita Krishnamurti for "Nimbooda"	Won	
Zee Cine Awards	11 March 2000	Best Choreography	Samir Tanna–Arsh Tanna for "Dholi Taro"	Nominated	
Zee Cine Awards	11 March 2000	Best Choreography	Saroj Khan for "Nimbooda"	Won	
Zee Cine Awards	11 March 2000	Best Choreography	Vaibhavi Merchant for "Aankhon Ki Gustakhiyan"	Nominated	
Zee Cine Awards	11 March 2000	Best Editing	Bela Sehgal	Nominated	
Zee Cine Awards	11 March 2000	Best Costume Design	Neeta Lulla	Nominated	
Zee Cine Awards	11 March 2000	Best Costume Design	Shabina Khan	Nominated	
Zee Cine Awards	11 March 2000	Best Art Direction	Nitin Chandrakant Desai	Won	
Zee Cine Awards	11 March 2000	Best Sound Recording	Jitendra Chaudhary	Nominated	
Zee Cine Awards	11 March 2000	Best Re-Recording	Suresh Kathuria	Nominated	
Zee Cine Awards	11 March 2000	Best Song Recording	Bishwadeep Chatterjee	Nominated	
Zee Cine Awards	11 March 2000	Best Special Effects (Visual)	Ramesh Meer	Nominated	
