= Godmother (film) =

- Directed by: Vinay Shukla
- Written by: Vinay Shukla
- Produced by: Rajat Sengupta
- Starring: Shabana Azmi; Milind Gunaji; Nirmal Pandey
- Cinematography: Rajan Kothari
- Edited by: Renu Saluja
- Music by: Vishal Bhardwaj
- Production company: Gramco Films
- Release date: 3 September 1999
- Running time: 150 min
- Country: India
- Language: Hindi
- Budget: ₹2.25 crore
- Box office: ₹3.10 crore

Godmother is a 1999 Indian Hindi biographical drama film directed by Vinay Shukla released in 1999, and ostensibly inspired by the life of Santokben Jadeja, who ran the Mafia operations at Porbandar, Gujarat, in the late 1980s and early 1990s and later turned politician.

== Cast ==
- Shabana Azmi - Rambhi
- Milind Gunaji - Veeram
- Nirmal Pandey - Jakhra
- Govind Namdev- Kesubhai
- Vinit Kumar - Lakhubhai
- Loveleen Mishra - Ramde's wife
- Raima Sen - Sejal
- Sharman Joshi - Karsan

== Music ==
Godmother

Soundtrack album by Vishal Bhardwaj
- Released: 2 January 1999
- Recorded: 1998
- Genre: Feature film soundtrack
- Length: 30:00
- Label: Saregama
- Producer: Vishal Bhardwaj

Vishal Bhardwaj chronology
Hu Tu Tu (1999)	Godmother (1999)	Dil Pe Mat Le Yaar!! (2000)

Godmother (Original Motion Picture Soundtrack) track listing.
No.	Title	Lyrics	Singer(s)	Length
1.	"High Tide – Theme Music"	Javed Akhtar	Sanjeev Abhyankar	2:02
2.	"Gunje Gagan"	Javed Akhtar	Roopkumar Rathod	4:09
3.	"Mati Re"	Javed Akhtar	Lata Mangeshkar	5:50
4.	"Raja Ki Kahani"	Javed Akhtar	Usha Uthup, Kavita Krishnamurthy, Rekha	5:27
5.	"Suno Re"	Javed Akhtar	Sanjeev Abhyankar	4:34
6.	"Tum Agar"	Javed Akhtar	Abhijeet Bhattacharya	2:12
7.	"Turbulence (Background Theme Music)"	Javed Akhtar	Sanjeev Abhyankar	1:58
8.	"Call Of Spring (Background Theme Music)"			1:37
9.	"Remembrance (Background Theme Music)"			2:53
Total length:				30:00

== Accolades ==
Award (Note: Awards, festivals and organizations are in Alphabetical order.)	Date of ceremony (Note: Date is linked to the article about the awards held that year, wherever possible.)	Category	Recipient(s)	Result	Ref.
Filmfare Awards	13 February 2000	Best Story	Vinay Shukla	Won	
International Indian Film Academy Awards	24 June 2000	Best Background Score	Vishal Bhardwaj	Won	
National Film Awards	15 February 2000	Best Hindi Feature Film	Producer: Gramco Films; Director: Vinay Shukla	Won	
National Film Awards	15 February 2000	Best Editing	Renu Saluja	Won	
National Film Awards	15 February 2000	Best Actress in a Leading Role	Shabana Azmi	Won	
National Film Awards	15 February 2000	Best Music Direction	Vishal Bhardwaj	Won	
National Film Awards	15 February 2000	Best Lyrics	Javed Akhtar (for "Maati Re Maati Re")	Won	
National Film Awards	15 February 2000	Best Male Playback Singer	Sanjeev Abhyankar (for "Suno Re Bhaila")	Won	
Screen Awards	23 January 2000	Best Story	Vinay Shukla	Nominated	
Screen Awards	23 January 2000	Best Actress	Shabana Azmi	Nominated	
Screen Awards	23 January 2000	Best Actor in a Negative Role	Govind Namdev	Nominated	
Screen Awards	23 January 2000	Best Female Debut	Raima Sen	Nominated	
Zee Cine Awards	11 March 2000	Best Cinematography	Rajan Kothari	Nominated	
Zee Cine Awards	11 March 2000	Best Costume Design	Mandira Shukla	Won	
Zee Cine Awards	11 March 2000	Best Editing	Renu Saluja	Nominated	
Zee Cine Awards	11 March 2000	Best Background Score	Vishal Bhardwaj	Nominated	
Zee Cine Awards	11 March 2000	Best Re-Recording	B.K. Chaturvedi	Nominated	
