= Sarfarosh (1999 film) =

1999 Hindi film by John Matthew Matthan

- Theatrical release poster
- Directed by: John Matthew Matthan
- Written by: John Mathew Matthan
- Dialogues by: Hriday Lani; Pathik Vats
- Produced by: John Matthew Matthan
- Starring: Aamir Khan; Sonali Bendre; Naseeruddin Shah
- Cinematography: Vikas Sivaraman
- Edited by: Jethu Mandal
- Music by: Songs: Jatin–Lalit; Score: Sanjoy Chowdhury
- Production company: Cinematt Pictures
- Distributed by: Eros International
- Release date: 30 April 1999
- Running time: 163 minutes
- Country: India
- Language: Hindi
- Budget: ₹8 crore
- Box office: ₹33.46 crore

Sarfarosh (transl. Fervent) is a 1999 Indian Hindi-language action thriller film written, produced, and directed by John Matthew Matthan. The film, based on true events regarding state-sponsored terrorism taken place in India during 1990s, stars Naseeruddin Shah, Aamir Khan, and Sonali Bendre, alongside Mukesh Rishi, Pradeep Rawat, Akhilendra Mishra, Makrand Deshpande, Shri Vallabh Vyas, Govind Namdev and Surekha Sikri. The soundtrack and musical score were composed by Jatin–Lalit and Sanjoy Chowdhury, while the cinematography and editing were handled by Vikas Sivaraman and Jethu Mundul respectively. The film revolves around an IPS officer's quest to eradicate cross-border terrorism.

Matthan started working on the film in 1992, and spent seven years on the research, pre-production and production. It was released on 30 April 1999. Matthan began developing Sarfarosh with the core idea of a personal revenge story. The idea later evolved after the 1993 Mumbai bomb blasts conspiracy came to light. Matthan and his co-writer Hriday Lani began researching, which grew into a deeper look at how Pakistan-backed terrorism operated in India, how the ISI infiltrated networks and how attacks were carried out with help from insiders across places like Mumbai, Rajasthan, and even South India.

Sarfarosh was released just before the Kargil conflict when tensions between India and Pakistan were high. The film became commercially successful at the box office. The movie received praise for its cast performances, technical aspects, action sequences, music and script. The film won the National Film Award for Best Popular Film Providing Wholesome Entertainment, the Filmfare Critics Award for Best Film, and was screened at the International Film Festival of India. The film was remade in Kannada as Sathyameva Jayathe and in Telugu as Astram.

== Plot ==
Arms trafficking is taking place across western India. Bala Thakur, a gun handler in Bahid, Rajasthan, provides AK-47 arms to Veeran, a notorious brigand. Veeran and his adivasi gang loot a Telugu wedding group gunning down every person in the bus at Chandrapur, the border area of Maharashtra and Telangana known for naxalite–maoist insurgency. The government appoints a Special Action Team in Mumbai to trace the attack.

Assistant Commissioner of Police Ajay Singh Rathod, a resident of Mumbai, attends a concert by famed ghazal singer, the elderly Gulfam Hassan, a Muhajir. Gulfam is Indian by birth but had to move to Pakistan as a child during the partition; deeply scarred by the experience, he is happy that the government allows him to live in his palatial residence whenever he comes to India. Gulfam finds a huge fan in Ajay, who used to attend his programs as a child, and the two bond. Ajay also reunites with Seema, whom he had a crush on when they were studying in Delhi. The duo falls in love.

Inspector Saleem, an honest policeman, is taken off the team when notorious gangster Sultan escapes his clutches. He is reprimanded for this failure and for causing the death of three constables in the attempt. Despite Saleem doing his duty sincerely, his senior officers look down upon him because he is a Muslim. When Ajay, who is younger, inexperienced and was mentored by Saleem himself before assuming charge, is told to head the team, Saleem is upset and refuses to take part in the investigation. Ajay's past is revealed: his father was going to testify against a terrorist, and in an attempt to stop them, Ajay's elder brother was killed. His father was kidnapped, and by the time the terrorists spared him, the man had lost his voice. This motivated Ajay to join the police force.

Gulfam is revealed to be working for the Pakistani intelligence, which is attempting to indulge in a proxy war with India. Since Gulfam likes Ajay, he sees to it that nothing happens to him. Saleem finds the location of Bala Thakur and Sultan and gives the information to Ajay, who convinces him to join the team again. An encounter with the criminals results in the death of Bala Thakur while Ajay is injured. Though Sultan escapes, the operation is a success as the team is able to intercept a consignment of lethal arms meant for terrorist Veeran. Sultan is assassinated on Gulfam's orders because of his failure, with false information relayed to Saleem's informer network that Sultan has escaped to Pakistan.

While recovering from his injuries in the hospital, Ajay narrates the events to Seema, when he has an epiphany. He goes back to the site with Seema's help where he finds a horoscope of Bala Thakur, which leads the team to Bahid in Rajasthan. Following his recovery, Ajay meets Gulfam in Bahid, who is temporarily staying in his ancestral manor. Gulfam's attempts to derail the investigation, even ordering an assault on Ajay, are of no avail. The repeated failures displease the Pakistani Intelligence, which dispatch Major Aslam Baig to take care of the business.

The team prepares for a final assault on the gun-running operation and ultimately land at Gulfam's mansion. Ajay feels betrayed when he learns of Gulfam's betrayal, but is aware of the lack of evidence to indict him for his crimes. He tricks Gulfam into killing Baig and arrests him for it. Gulfam reveals that he did what he did because of how his experiences during the partition hurt him. Ajay makes him realize that his actions are not benefiting any people of any religion, and Gulfam, unable to stand the humiliation and guilt, commits suicide. His suicide is hushed up, and the team returns to Mumbai to much accolades for busting the terrorist racket. Saleem is tipped on the whereabouts of Veeran, and Ajay embarks on another investigation with his team.

== Cast ==
- Aamir Khan as ACP Ajay Singh Rathod
- Sonali Bendre as Seema Nagrath, Ajay's girlfriend
- Naseeruddin Shah as Gulfam Hassan, a Pakistani singer who works for ISI
- Mukesh Rishi as Inspector Saleem Ahmed
- Akash Khurana as Mr. Rathod, Ajay's father
- Smita Jaykar as Mrs. Rathod, Ajay's mother
- Sukanya Kulkarni as Ajay's sister-in-law
- Akhilendra Mishra as Rambandhu Gupta / Mirchi Seth
- Ahmed Khan as Haji Seth
- Pradeep Rawat as Sultan Deep
- Makrand Deshpande as Shiva
- Shri Vallabh Vyas as Major Aslam Baig
- Rajesh Joshi as Bala Thakur
- Ali Khan as Captain Shafi
- Upasana Singh as Mala Sharma
- Salim Shah as Inspector Rajan Yadav
- Manoj Joshi as SI Bajju
- Ramesh Goyal as Hawaldar Rakesh Kadam
- Khodus Wadia as ISI General
- Anil Upadhyay as Fatka
- Govind Namdev as Veeran (special appearance)
- Surekha Sikri as Mrs. Deep, Sultan's mother (special appearance)
- Dinesh Kaushik as Roshan Nagrath, Seema's brother
- Nawazuddin Siddiqui as the goon in police custody which gives information after torture (uncredited)
- Ashok Lokhande as Chandrapur Hawaldar
- Dinesh Phadnis as a SI Crime Branch
- Sunil Shende as Deputy Commissioner of Police

== Music ==
Sarfarosh

Studio album by Jatin–Lalit
- Released: 1999
- Genre: Feature film soundtrack
- Length: 30:47
- Label: Tips
- Producer: Jatin–Lalit

Jatin–Lalit chronology
Sangharsh (1999)	Sarfarosh (1999)	Silsila Hai Pyar Ka (1999)

The film's music was composed by Jatin–Lalit, with lyrics written by Israr Ansari, Nida Fazli, Sameer, and Indeevar.

The vocals for Shah, Khan and Bendre were provided by Jagjit Singh, Kumar Sanu and Alka Yagnik, respectively. The album also features the vocals of Kavita Krishnamurthy, Roop Kumar Rathod and Sonu Nigam.

Hosh Walon Ko Khabar Kya was penned by Nida Fazli, inspired by the Indian poet Kabirdas' verse Haman Hai Ishq Mastana. Jatin Pandit has specified that Jatin-Lalit recorded the ghazal with Bhupinder Singh, for whom it was originally composed, but on the insistence of the film's administrators and their request for a more popular ghazal singer, leading them to approach Jagjit Singh. Jatin noted that he made it a point to create a new tune for the Jagjit Singh version as to honor the work put in by Bhupinder Singh earlier.

All lyrics are written by Indeevar, Israr Ansari, Nida Fazli, Sameer; all music is composed by Jatin–Lalit.

Track list
No.	Title	Lyrics	Singer(s)	Length
1.	"Zindagi Maut Na Ban Jaaye"	Israr Ansari	Roop Kumar Rathod, Sonu Nigam	06:18
2.	"Hoshwalon Ko Khabar Kya"	Nida Fazli	Jagjit Singh	05:02
3.	"Is Deewane Ladke Ko"	Sameer	Alka Yagnik, Aamir Khan	04:40
4.	"Yeh Jawani Hadd Kar De"	Sameer	Kavita Krishnamurthy	04:44
5.	"Jo Haal Dil Ka"	Sameer	Kumar Sanu, Alka Yagnik	05:26
6.	"Meri Raaton Ki Neendein"	Indeevar	Alka Yagnik	04:37

== Reception ==
=== Critical response ===
Upon release, Sarfarosh received critical acclaim from film critics. Naseeruddin Shah was especially praised for his role of a Muhajir. The reviewer for Filmfare rated the film four stars out of five and wrote, "What makes this film so exceptional is its carefully thought out characterization and brilliant performances. Although this is his first film, director John Mathew Matthan draws perfectly crafted outputs from his entire cast. Aamir brings the role of A.C.P. Rathod to a never-before-seen dimension of reality." He further added, "Sarfarosh succeeds in connecting with the audiences, as it manages to transcend its medium and do a great deal more than just entertain."

Suparn Verma of Rediff.com felt that the film "manages to marry serious cinema with the commercial variety" and wrote that the "script has this no-nonsense look to it, clearly and succinctly establishing the protagonist's past ..." In addition to commending the acting performances of Naseeruddin Shah, Aamir Khan and Sonali Bendre, he lauded the departments of direction, music, choreography, and called the camerawork "good in parts but lack[ing] technical finesse".

== Accolades ==
List of accolades received by Sarfarosh
Accolades
Award	Won	Nominated
Filmfare Awards	4	11
International Indian Film Academy Awards	2	9
National Film Awards	1	1
Screen Awards	3	10
Zee Cine Awards	2	11
- Total number of awards and nominations (Note: Awards in certain categories do not have prior nominations and only winners are announced by the jury. For simplification and to avoid errors, each award in this list has been presumed to have had a prior nomination.)
Totals	12	42
- References

Award (Note: Awards, festivals and organizations are in alphabetical order.)	Date of ceremony (Note: Date is linked to the article about the awards held that year, wherever possible.)	Category	Recipient(s)	Result	Ref.
Filmfare Awards	13 February 2000	Best Film	Sarfarosh	Nominated	
Filmfare Awards	13 February 2000	Best Film (Critics)	John Matthew Matthan	Won	
Filmfare Awards	13 February 2000	Best Director	John Matthew Matthan	Nominated	
Filmfare Awards	13 February 2000	Best Screenplay	John Matthew Matthan	Won	
Filmfare Awards	13 February 2000	Best Actor	Aamir Khan	Nominated	
Filmfare Awards	13 February 2000	Best Supporting Actor	Mukesh Rishi	Nominated	
Filmfare Awards	13 February 2000	Best Performance in a Negative Role	Naseeruddin Shah	Nominated	
Filmfare Awards	13 February 2000	Best Music Director	Jatin–Lalit	Nominated	
Filmfare Awards	13 February 2000	Best Lyricist	Israr Ansari – (for song "Zindagi Maut Na Ban Jaye")	Nominated	
Filmfare Awards	13 February 2000	Best Dialogue	Hriday Lani, Pathik Vats	Won	
Filmfare Awards	13 February 2000	Best Editing	Jethu Mundul	Won	
International Indian Film Academy Awards	24 June 2000	Best Film	Sarfarosh	Nominated	
International Indian Film Academy Awards	24 June 2000	Best Director	John Matthew Matthan	Nominated	
International Indian Film Academy Awards	24 June 2000	Best Story	John Matthew Matthan	Nominated	
International Indian Film Academy Awards	24 June 2000	Best Actor	Aamir Khan	Nominated	
International Indian Film Academy Awards	24 June 2000	Best Actress	Sonali Bendre	Nominated	
International Indian Film Academy Awards	24 June 2000	Best Supporting Actor	Mukesh Rishi	Nominated	
International Indian Film Academy Awards	24 June 2000	Best Performance in a Negative Role	Naseeruddin Shah	Won	
International Indian Film Academy Awards	24 June 2000	Best Lyricist	Israr Ansari – (for song "Zindagi Maut Na Ban Jaye")	Nominated	
International Indian Film Academy Awards	24 June 2000	Best Art Direction	Keshto Mandal	Won	
National Film Awards	18 September 2000	Best Popular Film Providing Wholesome Entertainment	Producer: John Matthew Matthan; Director: John Matthew Matthan	Won	
Screen Awards	23 January 2000	Best Film	Sarfarosh	Nominated	
Screen Awards	23 January 2000	Best Director	John Matthew Matthan	Nominated	
Screen Awards	23 January 2000	Most Promising Debut Director	John Matthew Matthan	Won	
Screen Awards	23 January 2000	Best Story	John Matthew Matthan	Won	
Screen Awards	23 January 2000	Best Screenplay	John Matthew Matthan	Nominated	
Screen Awards	23 January 2000	Best Actor	Aamir Khan	Nominated	
Screen Awards	23 January 2000	Best Supporting Actor	Mukesh Rishi	Nominated	
Screen Awards	23 January 2000	Best Lyricist	Israr Ansari – (for song "Zindagi Maut Na Ban Jaye")	Nominated	
Screen Awards	23 January 2000	Best Dialogue	Hriday Lani, Pathik Vats	Nominated	
Screen Awards	23 January 2000	Best Editing	Jethu Mundul	Won	
Zee Cine Awards	11 March 2000	Best Director	John Matthew Matthan	Nominated	
Zee Cine Awards	11 March 2000	Best Screenplay	John Matthew Matthan	Nominated	
Zee Cine Awards	11 March 2000	Best Actor – Male	Aamir Khan	Won	
Zee Cine Awards	11 March 2000	Best Actor in a Supporting Role – Male	Mukesh Rishi	Nominated	
Zee Cine Awards	11 March 2000	Best Performance in a Negative Role	Naseeruddin Shah	Nominated	
Zee Cine Awards	11 March 2000	Best Lyricist	Israr Ansari – (for song "Zindagi Maut Na Ban Jaye")	Nominated	
Zee Cine Awards	11 March 2000	Best Dialogue	Hriday Lani, Pathik Vats	Nominated	
Zee Cine Awards	11 March 2000	Best Action	Abbas–Hanif	Nominated	
Zee Cine Awards	11 March 2000	Best Make Up Artist	Deepak Bhatee	Won	
Zee Cine Awards	11 March 2000	Best Art Direction	Keshto Mandal	Nominated	
Zee Cine Awards	11 March 2000	Best Sound Recording	Namita Nayak	Nominated	
