= 45th Filmfare Awards =

2000 awards for Hindi cinema

- Date: 13 February 2000
- Site: Mumbai, India

Highlights
- Best Picture: Hum Dil De Chuke Sanam
- Best Direction: Sanjay Leela Bhansali (Hum Dil De Chuke Sanam)
- Best Actor: Sanjay Dutt (Vaastav: The Reality)
- Best Actress: Aishwarya Rai Bachchan (Hum Dil De Chuke Sanam)
- Most awards: Hum Dil De Chuke Sanam (8)
- Most nominations: Hum Dil De Chuke Sanam (17)

Television coverage
- Channel: Sony Entertainment Television
- Network: Sony Pictures Networks India

The 45th Filmfare Awards for Hindi-language films from India were held on 13 February 2000, in Mumbai, India.

Hum Dil De Chuke Sanam led the ceremony with 17 nominations, followed by Taal with 12 nominations and Sarfarosh with 11 nominations.

Hum Dil De Chuke Sanam won 8 awards including Best Film, Best Director (for Sanjay Leela Bhansali) and Best Actress (for Aishwarya Rai), thus becoming the most-awarded film at the ceremony.

Sanjay Dutt won his first and only Best Actor award for his powerhouse performance in Vaastav: The Reality.

Aishwarya Rai received dual nominations for Best Actress for her performances in Hum Dil De Chuke Sanam and Taal, winning for the former.

Sushmita Sen received dual nominations for Best Supporting Actress for her performances in Biwi No.1 and Sirf Tum, winning for the former.

The ceremony also proved to be notable since both Rai (Best Actress winner) and Sen (Best Supporting Actress winner) were also former pageant winners for Miss World 1994 and Miss Universe 1994 respectively.

== Awards ==
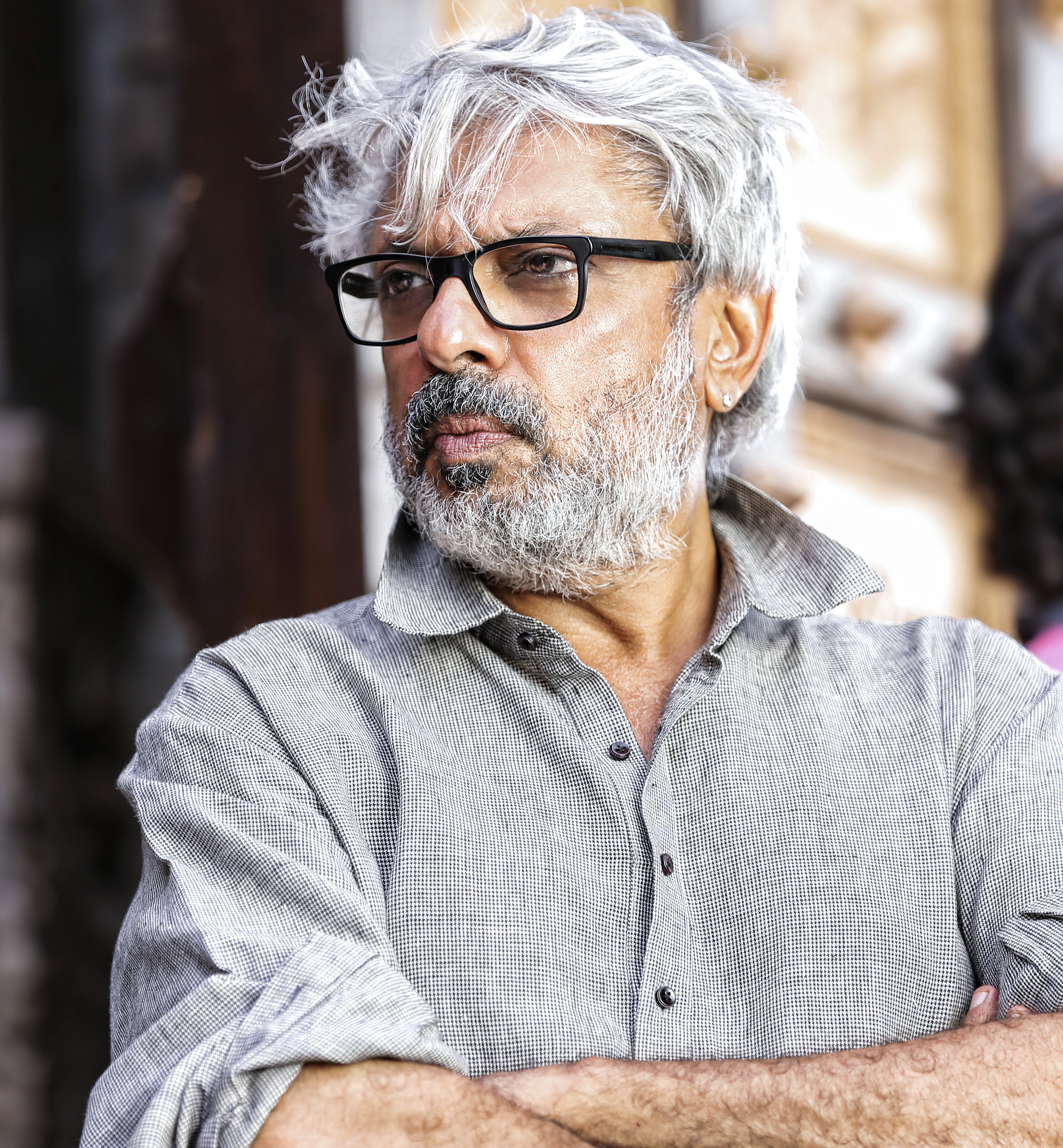
Sanjay Leela Bhansali — Best Director winner

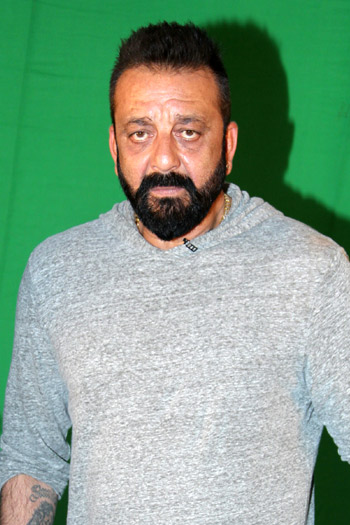
Sanjay Dutt — Best Actor winner

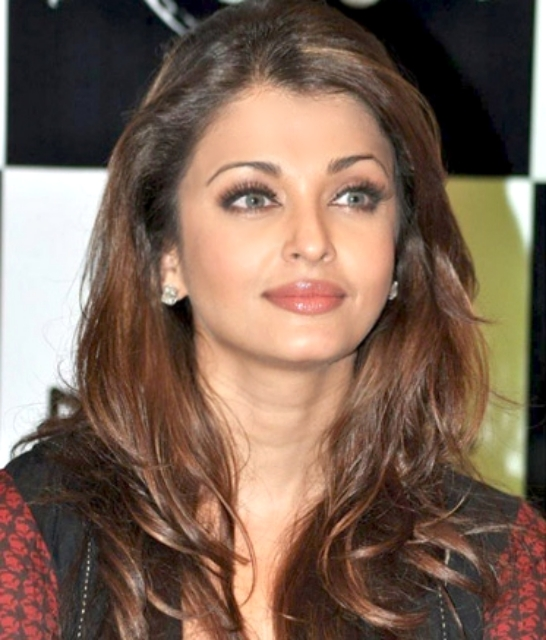
Aishwarya Rai Bachchan — Best Actress winner

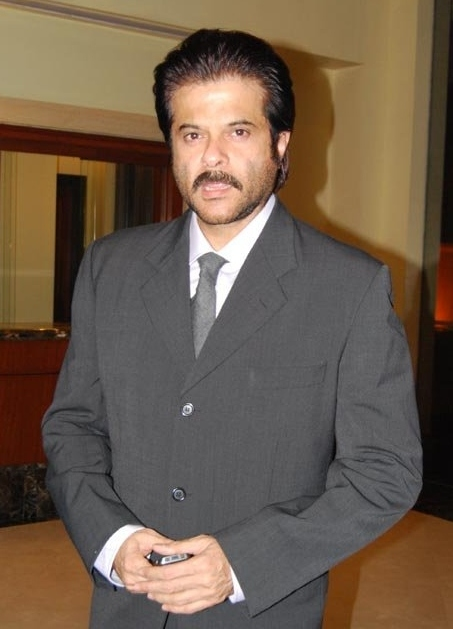
Anil Kapoor — Best Supporting Actor winner

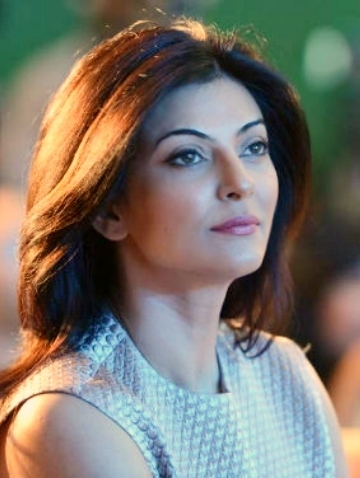
Sushmita Sen — Best Supporting Actress winner

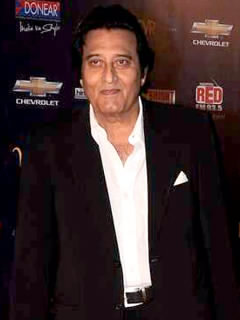
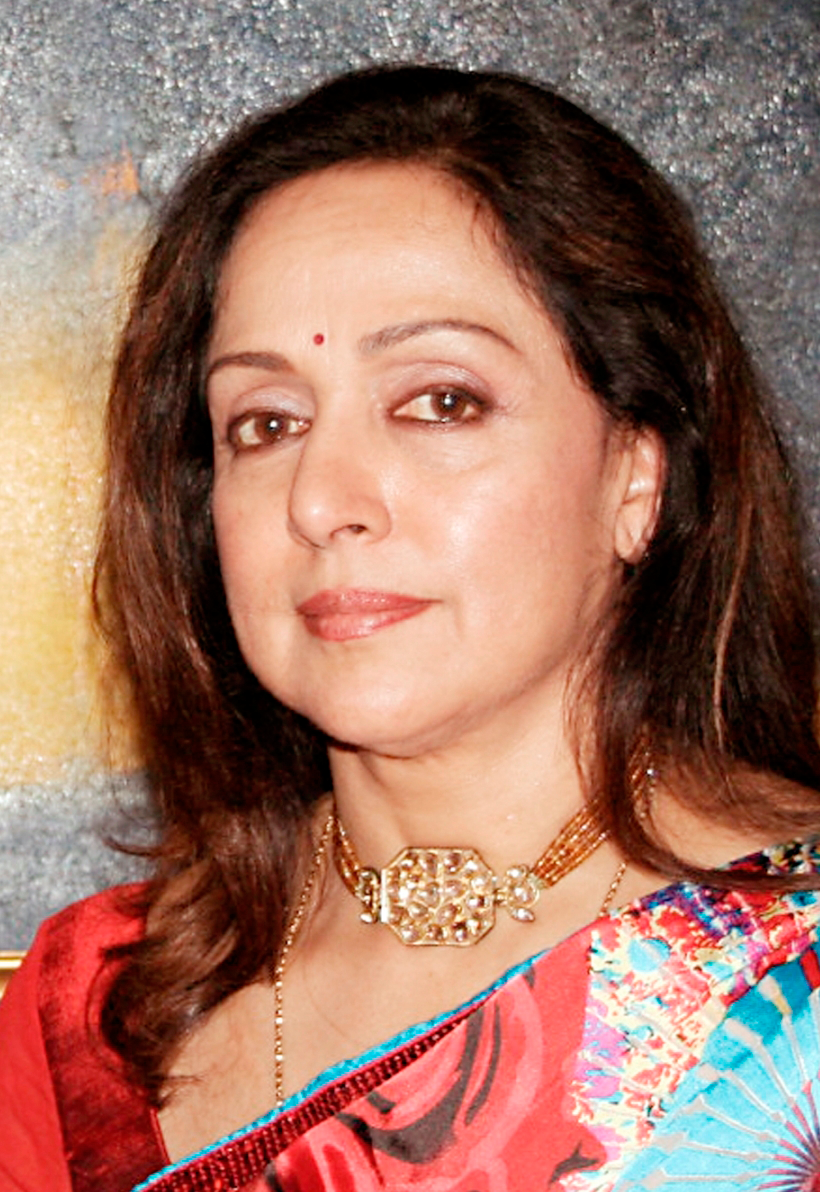
Vinod Khanna and Hema Malini, Lifetime Achievement Awardees

The winners and nominees have been listed below. The winners are listed first, highlighted in boldface, and indicated with a double dagger (‡).

=== Popular Awards ===
Best Film	Best Director
**Hum Dil De Chuke Sanam**‡; Biwi No.1; Sarfarosh; Taal; Vaastav: The Reality	**Sanjay Leela Bhansali – Hum Dil De Chuke Sanam**‡; David Dhawan – Biwi No.1; John Matthew Matthan – Sarfarosh; Mahesh Manjrekar – Vaastav: The Reality; Subhash Ghai – Taal
Best Actor	Best Actress
**Sanjay Dutt – Vaastav: The Reality**‡; Aamir Khan – Sarfarosh; Ajay Devgn – Hum Dil De Chuke Sanam; Manoj Bajpayee – Shool; Salman Khan – Hum Dil De Chuke Sanam	**Aishwarya Rai – Hum Dil De Chuke Sanam**‡; Aishwarya Rai – Taal; Kajol – Hum Aapke Dil Mein Rehte Hain; Karisma Kapoor – Biwi No.1; Tabu – Hu Tu Tu
Best Supporting Actor	Best Supporting Actress
**Anil Kapoor – Taal**‡; Mohnish Bahl – Hum Saath-Saath Hain; Mukesh Rishi – Sarfarosh; Saif Ali Khan – Kachche Dhaage; Sanjay Narvekar – Vaastav: The Reality	**Sushmita Sen – Biwi No.1**‡; Mahima Chaudhry – Dil Kya Kare; Reema Lagoo – Vaastav: The Reality; Suhasini Mulay – Hu Tu Tu; Sushmita Sen – Sirf Tum
Best Performance in a Negative Role	Best Performance in a Comic Role
**Ashutosh Rana – Sangharsh**‡; Amrish Puri – Baadshah; Naseeruddin Shah – Sarfarosh; Rahul Bose – Thakshak; Sayaji Shinde – Shool	**Govinda – Haseena Maan Jaayegi**‡; Anil Kapoor – Biwi No.1; Johnny Lever – Anari No.1; Salman Khan – Biwi No.1; Shah Rukh Khan – Baadshah
Best Music Director	Best Lyricist
**A. R. Rahman – Taal**‡; Anu Malik – Biwi No.1; Anu Malik – Haseena Maan Jaayegi; Ismail Darbar – Hum Dil De Chuke Sanam; Jatin–Lalit – Sarfarosh	**Anand Bakshi – "Ishq Bina" – Taal**‡; Anand Bakshi – "Taal Se Taal" – Taal; Israr Ansari – "Zindagi Maut Na Ban Jaye" – Sarfarosh; Mehboob – "Aankhon Ki Gustakhiyan" – Hum Dil De Chuke Sanam; Mehboob – "Tadap Tadap" – Hum Dil De Chuke Sanam
Best Male Playback Singer	Best Female Playback Singer
**Udit Narayan – "Chand Chupa Badal Mein" – Hum Dil De Chuke Sanam**‡; KK – "Tadap Tadap" – Hum Dil De Chuke Sanam; Kumar Sanu – "Aankhon Ki Gustakhiyan" – Hum Dil De Chuke Sanam; Sonu Nigam – "Ishq Bina" – Taal; Sukhwinder Singh – "Ramta Jogi" – Taal	**Alka Yagnik – "Taal Se Taal" – Taal**‡; Alka Yagnik – "Chand Chupa Badal Mein" – Hum Dil De Chuke Sanam; Kavita Krishnamurti – "Hum Dil De Chuke Sanam" – Hum Dil De Chuke Sanam; Kavita Krishnamurti – "Nimbooda" – Hum Dil De Chuke Sanam; Sunidhi Chauhan – "Ruki Ruki" – Mast

=== Technical Awards ===
Best Story	Best Screenplay
**Vinay Shukla – Godmother**‡	**John Matthew Matthan – Sarfarosh**‡
Best Dialogue	Best Action
**Hriday Lani and Pathik Vats – Sarfarosh**‡	**Tinu Verma – Arjun Pandit**‡
Best Background Score	Best Choreography
**Anjan Biswas – Hum Dil De Chuke Sanam**‡	**Saroj Khan – "Nimbooda" – Hum Dil De Chuke Sanam**‡
Best Editing	Best Art Direction
**Jethu Mundul – Sarfarosh**‡	**Nitin Chandrakant Desai – Hum Dil De Chuke Sanam**‡
Best Sound Design	Best Cinematography
**Rakesh Ranjan – Taal**‡	**Kabir Lal – Taal**‡

=== Critics' awards ===
Best Film
**John Matthew Matthan – Sarfarosh**‡
Best Actor	Best Actress
**Manoj Bajpayee – Shool**‡	**Tabu – Hu Tu Tu**‡

=== Special awards ===
Lifetime Achievement Award
**Hema Malini**	**Vinod Khanna**
Special Award Star of the Millennium
**Amitabh Bachchan**
Best Male Debut
**Rahul Khanna** – **Earth**
R. D. Burman Award
**Ismail Darbar** – **Hum Dil De Chuke Sanam**
Filmfare – Sony Award
**Mahesh Manjrekar** – **Vaastav: The Reality**

== Superlatives ==
Multiple nominations
Nominations	Film
17	Hum Dil De Chuke Sanam
12	Taal
11	Sarfarosh
7	Biwi No.1
6	Vaastav: The Reality
3	Hu Tu Tu
3	Shool
2	Baadshah
2	Haseena Maan Jaayegi

Multiple wins
Awards	Film
8	Hum Dil De Chuke Sanam
6	Taal
4	Sarfarosh
2	Vaastav: The Reality
