= Taal (film) =

1999 film by Subhash Ghai

- Film poster
- Directed by: Subhash Ghai
- Screenplay by: Sachin Bhowmick; Subhash Ghai
- Dialogues by: Javed Siddiqui
- Story by: Subhash Ghai
- Produced by: Subhash Ghai
- Starring: Anil Kapoor; Aishwarya Rai; Akshaye Khanna
- Narrated by: Akshaye Khanna
- Cinematography: Kabir Lal
- Edited by: Subhash Ghai
- Music by: A. R. Rahman
- Production company: Mukta Arts
- Distributed by: Mukta Arts; Tips Internationals
- Release date: 13 August 1999
- Running time: 181 minutes
- Country: India
- Language: Hindi
- Budget: ₹15 crore
- Box office: ₹51.16 crore

Taal (transl. Rhythm) is a 1999 Indian Hindi-language musical romantic drama co-written, edited, produced and directed by Subhash Ghai. The film stars Anil Kapoor, Aishwarya Rai and Akshaye Khanna in lead roles, while Amrish Puri and Alok Nath feature in supporting roles.

Taal was released on 13 August 1999, coinciding with the Indian Independence Day weekend, and proved to be a major commercial success at the domestic and overseas box-office, becoming the first Indian film to reach the Top 20 on Variety's box-office list.

At the 45th Filmfare Awards, Taal received 12 nominations, including Best Film, Best Director (Ghai) and Best Actress (Rai), and won 6 awards, including Best Supporting Actor (Kapoor), Best Music Director (Rahman) and Best Lyricist (Anand Bakshi for "Ishq Bina").

== Plot ==
Tycoon Jagmohan Mehta arrives in Chamba, India for a long vacation with his extended family, including his son, Manav. He meets Mansi, the beautiful daughter of an impoverished folk singer, Tara Shankar Manhuja. As the owner of the Mehta & Mehta Group of Companies, Jagmohan is looking to invest in Chamba. Over time, Jagmohan and Tara Shankar become friendly with each other.

Eventually, Manav is besotted with Mansi and they keep meeting. One day while doing Yoga together Manav tells her that he is in love with her, and asks her if she is also in love. She denies and says they cannot be together because of the difference in their status and that she will not meet him again. After running into each other once again and more encounters Mansi also falls in love with Manav. Jagmohan is against their relationship due to Mansi's poor socio-economic status. Tara Shankar is initially angry but later reaches Mumbai to visit his journalist cousin, Prabha, and to meet the Mehta family for a marriage alliance. Unfortunately, they insult Tara who has been waiting outside their house for 9 hours with Mansi. Instead of standing-up for Mansi, Manav who just arrives to the house takes his Father's side and insults Tara. Deeply hurt, Mansi leaves with her father, breaking up with Manav.

Mansi soon meets a famous music producer and director, Vikrant Kapoor while in Mumbai, who happens to be a huge fan of Tara's music. She starts working with him and performs dance numbers and remixes of his productions and Tara's songs. She begins to win awards and becomes a national sensation and celebrity. Slowly, Vikrant begins falling for Mansi. Meanwhile, Manav finds out that his family ill-treated Mansi and Tara.

Manav goes to Mumbai in the hopes of apologizing to Mansi for his family's behavior towards her and Tara. He tries to talk to Mansi who is doing a test shoot, and she tells Vikrant to reject him on her behalf and that she refuses to see him. He approaches her again in her tent; Mansi is upset; Manav apologises and asks her to marry him; Mansi lets out her pain for how her father was treated saying that she does not want his apology but rather his father to apologise to her father; they get into a disagreement. Vikrants team happy with the shoot offer her a contract for three years and she signs it as he watches. Manav tells Mansi that he will wait for her to come back and that she will be his wife and leaves. Vikrant soon learns of Mansi's past with Manav. Ignoring it, he proposes to her. She eventually accepts it and they get engaged. After winning an award in Canada, Mansi returns to India to prepare for their wedding. Manav gets burned while saving Mansi's memories in his house. Jagmohan realises Manav's true love for Mansi and goes to Tara's House with the proposal for Mansi marrying Manav, Tara tells him that he was hurt by how he was treated and that it was too late now, Mansi is engaged. Jagmohan and Tara eventually patch things up after the former realizes his mistake and apologizes.

On the wedding day, Vikrant realises Mansi still loves Manav. He assures her they can still be friends, and urges her to honor her love for Manav. Soon after, she runs to Manav and they reunite. Jagmohan and Tara give their blessings and apologize for separating them. The couple embrace accepting their love for each other. ; Manav and Mansi finally get married. The Mehtas take a family picture to celebrate the wedding.

== Cast ==
- Anil Kapoor as Vikrant Kapoor
- Aishwarya Rai as Mansi Shankar Manhuja
- Akshaye Khanna as Manav Kumar Mehta
- Amrish Puri as Jagmohan Mehta, Manav's father
- Alok Nath as Tara Shankar Manhuja "Tara Babu"
- Sushma Seth as Nani, Manav's grandmother
- Mita Vashisht as Prabha Shankar Manhuja
- Saurabh Shukla as Surjoy Banerjee
- Jividha Sharma as Ilavati "Ila" Shankar Manhuja
- Tanya Mukherjee as Shanno
- Supriya Karnik as Shakuntala Deepmohan Mehta "Shannu Aunty"
- Prithvi Zutshi as Deepmohan Mehta
- Manoj Pahwa as Santram Singh
- Rajesh Khera as Brijmohan Mehta
- Ekta Jain as Mansi's first cousin
- Puneet Vashisht as Shaukat
- Akash Karnataki as Siddu
- Bobby Darling as Dress Designer Narwendra Khanna
- Asha Bachani as Dolly Brijmohan Mehta
- Anita Hassanandani as Mansi's friend
- Subhash Ghai as man with walkman at market (cameo appearance)
- Shahid Kapoor as a dancer in the song "Kahin Aag Lage" (uncredited role)

== Music ==
Taal

Soundtrack album by A. R. Rahman
- Released: 12 June 1999 (Digital Release); 13 August 1999 (Film Release)
- Recorded: Mehboob Studio
- Genre: Soundtrack
- Length: 64:28
- Label: Tips Industries
- Producer: A. R. Rahman

A. R. Rahman chronology
Padayappa (1999)	Taal (1999)	Jodi (1999)

Soundtrack
Review scores
Source	Rating
Planet Bollywood	link

The soundtrack of the film was composed by A. R. Rahman with lyrics penned by Anand Bakshi. The soundtrack was released on 12 June 1999 and it became a major critical and commercial success. At a press conference, Ghai remarked, "I credit the name of the movie to composer A. R. Rahman. This film is a romance and I could have called it any thing – Dil, Pyaar, Hum Bhaag Gaye, but it was Rahman's presence in the movie that gave me the confidence to call it Taal. Taal means music and music means Taal. The whole credit goes to A. R. Rahman and Anand Bakshi. Rahman kept me awake many nights, but after listening to the songs, I felt it was worth all the trouble."

The soundtrack became a tremendous commercial success, and was sold more than 1.85 million units within a month of its release. It went on to sell 4 million units, becoming the best-selling album of the year. The soundtrack made the list of "Greatest Bollywood Soundtracks of All Time", as compiled by Planet Bollywood. The official western version of the song "Taal Se Taal" was later reused in the 2023 Tamil film Jailer.

=== Track listing ===
All lyrics are written by Anand Bakshi; all music is composed by A. R. Rahman.

Taal (Original Motion Picture Soundtrack) – Hindi
No.	Title	Singer(s)	Length
1.	"Taal Se Taal" (Raag Bhairavi)	Alka Yagnik, Udit Narayan	06:18
2.	"Ishq Bina"	Anuradha Sriram, Sujatha Mohan, Sonu Nigam, A. R. Rahman	07:45
3.	"Nahin Saamne Tu"	Hariharan, Sukhwinder Singh	06:03
4.	"Kahin Aag Lage Lag Jaaye"	Asha Bhosle, Aditya Narayan, Richa Sharma	07:15
5.	"Taal Se Taal Mila" (Western Version)	Sukhwinder Singh	02:34
6.	"Ramta Jogi"	Sukhwinder Singh, Alka Yagnik	06:17
7.	"Beat Of Passion"	A.R.Rahman	02:51
8.	"Ishq Bina Ishq Bina"	Kavita Krishnamurthy, Sukhwinder Singh	08:13
9.	"Kariye Na"	Sukhwinder Singh, Alka Yagnik	07:15
10.	"Ni Main Samajh Gayi"	Richa Sharma, Sukhwinder Singh	04:33
11.	"Kya Dekh Rahe Ho Tum"	Madhu Vaishali, Shoma	02:31
12.	"Raga Dance"	A. R. Rahman	02:53
Total length:			64:28

== Reception ==
=== Commercial performance ===
Taal emerged as a major commercial success in India, netting ₹23 crore in India on a budget of ₹11.50 crore, and also performed well internationally. In the United States, it became the first Indian film to reach the top 20 on Variety's box-office list. The final worldwide gross collection of the film stands at ₹51.16 crore, making it the third highest-grossing Hindi film of the year.

Taal was premiered at the Chicago International Film Festival, and was screened as the "official selection" at the 2005 Ebertfest: Roger Ebert's Film Festival, and retrospectively at the 45th IFFI in the Celebrating Dance in Indian cinema section.

== Accolades ==
At the 45th Filmfare Awards, Taal received 12 nominations, including Best Film, Best Director (Ghai) and Best Actress (Rai, who won the award for her performance in Hum Dil De Chuke Sanam), and won 6 awards, including Best Supporting Actor (Kapoor) and Best Music Director (Rahman).

Award (Note: Awards, festivals and organizations are in alphabetical order.)	Date of ceremony (Note: Date is linked to the article about the awards held that year, wherever possible.)	Category	Recipient(s)	Result	Ref.
Bollywood Movie Awards (Note: as Zee Gold Bollywood Awards.)	8 June 2000	Best Film	Taal	Won	
Bollywood Movie Awards	8 June 2000	Best Actress	Aishwarya Rai	Won	
Bollywood Movie Awards	8 June 2000	Most Sensational Actress	Aishwarya Rai	Won	
Bollywood Movie Awards	8 June 2000	Best Actor (Critics)	Anil Kapoor	Won	
Bollywood Movie Awards	8 June 2000	Best Music Director	A. R. Rahman	Won	
Bollywood Movie Awards	8 June 2000	Best Lyricist	Anand Bakshi for "Taal Se Taal"	Won	
Bollywood Movie Awards	8 June 2000	Best Editing	Subhash Ghai	Won	
Filmfare Awards	13 February 2000	Best Film	Taal	Nominated	
Filmfare Awards	13 February 2000	Best Director	Subhash Ghai	Nominated	
Filmfare Awards	13 February 2000	Best Actress	Aishwarya Rai	Nominated	
Filmfare Awards	13 February 2000	Best Supporting Actor	Anil Kapoor	Won	
Filmfare Awards	13 February 2000	Best Music Director	A. R. Rahman	Won	
Filmfare Awards	13 February 2000	Best Lyricist	Anand Bakshi for "Ishq Bina"	Won	
Filmfare Awards	13 February 2000	Best Lyricist	Anand Bakshi for "Taal Se Taal"	Nominated	
Filmfare Awards	13 February 2000	Best Male Playback Singer	Sonu Nigam for "Ishq Bina"	Nominated	
Filmfare Awards	13 February 2000	Best Male Playback Singer	Sukhwinder Singh for "Ramta Jogi"	Nominated	
Filmfare Awards	13 February 2000	Best Female Playback Singer	Alka Yagnik for "Taal Se Taal"	Won	
Filmfare Awards	13 February 2000	Best Cinematography	Kabir Lal	Won	
Filmfare Awards	13 February 2000	Best Sound Design	Rakesh Ranjan	Won	
International Indian Film Academy Awards	24 June 2000	Best Film	Taal	Nominated	
International Indian Film Academy Awards	24 June 2000	Best Director	Subhash Ghai	Nominated	
International Indian Film Academy Awards	24 June 2000	Best Actress	Aishwarya Rai	Nominated	
International Indian Film Academy Awards	24 June 2000	Best Supporting Actor	Anil Kapoor	Won	
International Indian Film Academy Awards	24 June 2000	Best Music Director	A. R. Rahman	Won	
International Indian Film Academy Awards	24 June 2000	Best Lyricist	Anand Bakshi for "Ishq Bina"	Won	
International Indian Film Academy Awards	24 June 2000	Best Male Playback Singer	Sonu Nigam for "Ishq Bina"	Nominated	
International Indian Film Academy Awards	24 June 2000	Best Male Playback Singer	Sukhwinder Singh for "Ramta Jogi"	Nominated	
International Indian Film Academy Awards	24 June 2000	Best Female Playback Singer	Alka Yagnik for "Taal Se Taal"	Won	
International Indian Film Academy Awards	24 June 2000	Best Female Playback Singer	Anuradha Sriram for "Ishq Bina"	Nominated	
International Indian Film Academy Awards	24 June 2000	Best Female Playback Singer	Sunidhi Chauhan for "Kya Dekh Rahe Ho Tum"	Nominated	
International Indian Film Academy Awards	24 June 2000	Best Costume Design	Neeta Lulla	Won	
Screen Awards	23 January 2000	Best Film	Taal	Nominated	
Screen Awards	23 January 2000	Best Director	Subhash Ghai	Nominated	
Screen Awards	23 January 2000	Best Supporting Actor	Anil Kapoor	Won	
Screen Awards	23 January 2000	Best Music Director	A. R. Rahman	Won	
Screen Awards	23 January 2000	Best Lyricist	Anand Bakshi for "Ramta Jogi"	Nominated	
Screen Awards	23 January 2000	Best Lyricist	Anand Bakshi for "Taal Se Taal"	Won	
Screen Awards	23 January 2000	Best Male Playback Singer	Sonu Nigam for "Ishq Bina"	Nominated	
Screen Awards	23 January 2000	Best Male Playback Singer	Sukhwinder Singh for "Ramta Jogi"	Won	
Screen Awards	23 January 2000	Best Female Playback Singer	Alka Yagnik for "Taal Se Taal"	Nominated	
Screen Awards	23 January 2000	Best Female Playback Singer	Asha Bhosle for "Kahin Aag Lage"	Nominated	
Screen Awards	23 January 2000	Best Costume Design	Neeta Lulla	Won	
Zee Cine Awards	11 March 2000	Best Actor – Female	Aishwarya Rai	Nominated	
Zee Cine Awards	11 March 2000	Lux Face of the Year (Note: also for Hum Dil De Chuke Sanam.)	Aishwarya Rai	Won	
Zee Cine Awards	11 March 2000	Best Actor in a Supporting Role – Male	Anil Kapoor	Won	
Zee Cine Awards	11 March 2000	Best Performance in a Negative Role	Amrish Puri	Nominated	
Zee Cine Awards	11 March 2000	Best Music Director	A. R. Rahman	Won	
Zee Cine Awards	11 March 2000	Best Lyricist	Anand Bakshi for "Ishq Bina"	Won	
Zee Cine Awards	11 March 2000	Best Lyricist	Anand Bakshi for "Taal Se Taal"	Nominated	
Zee Cine Awards	11 March 2000	Best Choreography	Shiamak Davar for "Kahin Aag Lage"	Nominated	
Zee Cine Awards	11 March 2000	Best Cinematography	Kabir Lal	Nominated	
Zee Cine Awards	11 March 2000	Best Art Direction	Sharmishta Roy	Nominated	
Zee Cine Awards	11 March 2000	Best Make Up Artist	Kiran R. Naik	Nominated	

== See also ==
- Asai Man Piyabanna, a 2007 Sri Lankan remake
