= John Matthew Matthan =

Indian filmmaker

- Born: Kerala
- Occupation: Film director
- Years active: 1999-2013
- Notable work: Sarfarosh

John Mathew Matthan (also John Mathew Mathan/John Mathew) is an Indian filmmaker, who works in Hindi cinema. He is known for directing Sarfarosh, starring Aamir Khan and Naseeruddin Shah.

== Film career ==
John Matthew started his career as an assistant director on the epic movie Gandhi, directed by Sir Richard Attenborough. Also working on Gandhi was Govind Nihlani, who Matthan would later assist for several films before shifting to directing advertisements.

In the early 1990s, Matthan started his own production company in Mahalaxmi, Mumbai called Cinematt Pictures Pvt Ltd. The company, which also involved Matthan's brother George, released its first feature film entitled Sarfarosh in 1999. Matthan began work on Sarfarosh in 1992. Seven years were spent on the research, pre-production, and production of the film until it was finally released to both critical and commercial success. The reviewer for Filmfare rated the film four stars out of five and wrote about Matthan, "Although this is his first film, director John Mathew Matthan draws perfectly crafted outputs from his entire cast."

After Sarfarosh, Matthan started working on a script which involved the issue of brain drain. However, after the tragedy of 9/11, the script lost its pertinence and Matthan moved on to another idea that germinated in the form of Shikhar (2005).

In 2007, Matthan began work on his next film titled A New Love Ishtory. Written by Vipul K Rawal and starring Himesh Reshammiya and Niharika Singh, the film was completed in 2009 but its release delayed to 29 September 2013 due to a falling out between Himesh Reshammiya and his record label T-Series.

== Filmography ==
Year	Film	Language	Director	Producer	Writer	Assistant Director
1980	Aakrosh	Hindi				Yes
1982	Gandhi	English				Yes
1999	Sarfarosh	Hindi	Yes	Yes	Yes	
2005	Shikhar	Hindi	Yes	Yes	Yes	
TBA	A New Love Ishtory	Hindi	Yes		Yes	

== Awards ==
Year	Awards	Category	Film	Results	Refs
2000	47th National Film Awards	Best Popular Film Providing Wholesome Entertainment	Sarfarosh	Won	
2000	45th Filmfare Awards	Best Film (Critics)	Sarfarosh	Won	
2000	45th Filmfare Awards	Best Screenplay	Sarfarosh	Won	
2000	45th Filmfare Awards	Best Director	Sarfarosh	Nominated	

=== Accolades ===
- Chairperson jury feature film, Indian Panorama at 51st International Film Festival of India, Goa 2021.
