= Bijon Dasgupta =

Art director

Bijon Dasgupta (Bengali: বিজন দাশগুপ্ত) born April 30, 1951, is an art director of Indian film industry.

== Life and career ==
Dasgupta's entry into the film industry was facilitated by a family friend, Zul Velani, a documentary filmmaker. Velani advised him to stop spending money on watching films and instead invest in books about filmmaking. Acting on this advice, Dasgupta joined the Bangalore Little Theatre, where he began designing sets for stage productions.

While working in theatre, he met German director David Horsebrow and started collaborating with him as an art director. This led to a nine‑year tenure at Doordarshan, India's public broadcaster, where he served as head of the designing department. During this period, he interacted with creative professionals from across the country and developed the ability to construct and dismantle sets rapidly, as the department had only one floor available for all productions—a skill that later proved invaluable in the film industry.

Dasgupta made his debut as an art director with Shekhar Kapur's Masoom, and the first film itself gave him the recognition and respect that he now enjoys within the industry. Dasgupta strives to make his setup different and look as real as possible. So that the audience could relate to those places. He bagged big movies like Hum Apke Hain Kaun, Gup, Dil, Umrao Jaan, Mr. India, and many others.

Dasgupta started with a job in Doordarshan as a head of the designing department for 9 years and got to interact with the creative people all over the country.

== Awards ==
- 1996 - Filmfare Best Art Direction Award for Prem
