= Hu Tu Tu =

1999 Indian film directed by Gulzar

- Theatrical release poster
- Directed by: Gulzar
- Screenplay by: Gulzar; Meghna Gulzar
- Produced by: Dhirajlal Shah
- Starring: Nana Patekar; Sunil Shetty; Tabu; Suhasini Mulay
- Cinematography: Manmohan Singh; Rajan Kothari
- Edited by: Ram Koti; Ram; Sada
- Music by: Vishal Bhardwaj
- Release date: 22 January 1999
- Running time: 173 Mins
- Country: India
- Language: Hindi

Hu Tu Tu is a 1999 Indian Hindi-language drama film directed by Gulzar, starring Nana Patekar, Suniel Shetty, Tabu and Suhasini Mulay.

== Plot ==
The story opens with the kidnapping of Panna Barve, the daughter of Chief Minister Malti Barve. The responsible gang's demand is that one of their members be released from police custody. While in captivity, Panna reminisces about her childhood, where she had to struggle to grow up with a power hungry and inconsiderate mother and a simple, quiet, and spineless father. Panna's mother had also been carrying on a rather open affair with party co-member Sawantrao Gadre. Flashback over and Panna soon meets the man behind her kidnapping Aditya Patel who Panna knows from before.

Via second flashback, we learn that Panna and "Adi" were lovers once upon a time. Their closeness stemmed from the fact that he also was struggling with a corrupt parent in the form of businessman father, P.N. Patel. Panna and Adi both find solace in a poor basti with the company of Adi's old teacher Joshi Master and in the philosophy of poet Bhau, much to the dismay of the couple's respective parents. Bhau even goes to the extent of becoming Malti's most vociferous opponent. Due to a sudden car accident, however, Adi is presumed dead and Panna loses Adi's out-of-wedlock baby before it can be born. Thus ends the second flashback.

Getting back to the kidnapping, Adi and Panna reunite after quite some time. They talk to each other and piece together the events that have occurred since their separation. Just then, the missing gang member is sent back to Adi. It is none other than Bhau, who is returned to the gang with his brain destroyed by electric shock. News also comes that Joshi Master is killed in jail and it is portrayed as a suicide. Panna and Adi then decide what the best form of poetic justice will be for their parents. They both sneak into an election campaign of Malti Barve and P.N. Patel, and explode bombs attached to them, thus destroying everything. The film ends with Panna's father working as headmaster in a school.

Gulzar suggests that although we have already ruined the world for Generation X, we should focus our efforts into the protection and education of our school children. If we shield them from this corruption, they will become the leaders of tomorrow, and they will run the country the way it should be.

== Cast ==
- Nana Patekar as Bhau
- Sunil Shetty as Aditya Patel (Adi)
- Tabu as Panna Barve
- Suhasini Mulay as Maltibai Barve
- Shivaji Satam as Barve
- Mohan Agashe as Sawantrao Gadre
- Kulbhushan Kharbanda as P.N. Patel
- Raj Zutshi as Arun Barve
- Gracy Singh as Shanti
- Ajit Vachani as Police Commissioner J.D.
- Rajesh Khera

== Soundtrack ==
Hu Tu Tu

Soundtrack album by Vishal Bhardwaj
- Released: 1998
- Genre: Feature film soundtrack
- Label: Tips Music

Music by Vishal Bhardwaj.

1. "Itna Lamba Kash Lo Yaaro" - Lata Mangeshkar, Hariharan
2. "Bandobast Hai, Jabardast Hai" - Roop Kumar Rathod
3. "Chhai Chhap Chhai, Chhapa Ke Chhai" - Lata Mangeshkar, Hariharan
4. "Ghapla Hai, Ghapla Hai, Ghapla Hai Bhai" - Roop Kumar Rathod
5. "Jago Jago Jagte Raho, Jago Jago Jagte Raho" - Roop Kumar Rathod
6. "Jai Hind Hind, Guru Manter Mera" - Lata Mangeshkar
7. "Nikla Neem Ke Talese Nikla" - Anuradha Paudwal, Kavita Krishnamurthy, Roop Kumar Rathod
8. "Ye Ankhe, Ye Num Ankhe" - Lata Mangeshkar

== Reception ==
A critic from Rediff.com wrote that "Hu Tu Tu ranks as one of Gulzar's finest and is a must see". A critic from India Today wrote that "Hu Tu Tu may well be Gulzar's political manifesto. The brutally honest and uncompromising statement doesn't make it easy for even the audience or the box office".

== Accolades ==
Award (Note: Awards, festivals and organizations are in Alphabetical order.)	Date of ceremony (Note: Date is linked to the article about the awards held that year, wherever possible.)	Category	Recipient(s)	Result	Ref.
Filmfare Awards	13 February 2000	Best Actress	Tabu	Nominated	
Filmfare Awards	13 February 2000	Critics Award for Best Actress	Tabu	Won	
Filmfare Awards	13 February 2000	Best Supporting Actress	Suhasini Mulay	Nominated	
National Film Awards	15 February 2000	Best Actress in a Supporting Role	Suhasini Mulay	Won	
Screen Awards	23 January 2000	Best Actress	Tabu	Nominated	
Screen Awards	23 January 2000	Best Supporting Actress	Suhasini Mulay	Nominated	
Screen Awards	23 January 2000	Best Sound Recording	Narender Singh	Won	
Zee Cine Awards	11 March 2000	Best Director	Gulzar	Nominated	
Zee Cine Awards	11 March 2000	Best Dialogue	Gulzar	Nominated	
Zee Cine Awards	11 March 2000	Best Make Up Artist	Suresh S. Harital	Nominated	
