= Nimbooda =

Song by Kavita Krishnamurthy and Karsan Sagathia

from the album Hum Dil De Chuke Sanam
- Released: 1999
- Genre: Soundtrack
- Length: 6:25
- Label: T-Series
- Songwriters: Ismail Darbar (music), Mehboob (lyrics)

Music video
- "Nimbooda" on YouTube

"Nimbooda" (English: "Lime") is a traditional folk tune from Rajasthan. It was first popularized by Gazi Khan Barna of the Manganiar community in Rajasthan.

The song discusses fetching limes from the fields as a double entendre.

== Commercial versions ==
"Nimbooda" was adapted for the 1999 Hindi film Hum Dil De Chuke Sanam. The music was adapted by Ismail Darbar and the lyrics were revised by Mehboob. "Nimbooda" was sung by Kavita Krishnamurthy and Karsan Sagathia and picturised on Aishwarya Rai, Ajay Devgn and Salman Khan.

== Music video ==
Within the film, the song is performed as a dance at a wedding in Rajasthan. After fighting with her love interest Sameer (Salman Khan), Nandini (Aishwarya Rai) draws the attention of Vanraj (Ajay Devgn) who is a guest at the wedding. Saroj Khan choreographed the dancers.

== Other versions ==
In 2017, Konnie Metaxa, a contestant on the Greek reality show Your Face Sounds Familiar, sang and danced to "Nimbooda" and won the 10th round with her performance.

The song was parodied by The Late Show with Stephen Colbert in February 2018. In the video, they digitally replaced Ajay Devgan's head with Donald Trump Jr. to satirise Trump's comments about poor people in India.

== Reception ==
This Song gone viral at SCERT Odisha Class 5 Odia Textbook and lyrics matched

== Awards ==
- 2000 Filmfare Award for Best Choreography for Saroj Khan
- 2000 Zee Cine Award for Best Female Playback Singer for Kavita Krishnamurthy
