= Zee Cine Award for Best Actor in a Supporting Role – Male =

Hindi film award

Zee Cine Award for Best Supporting Actor
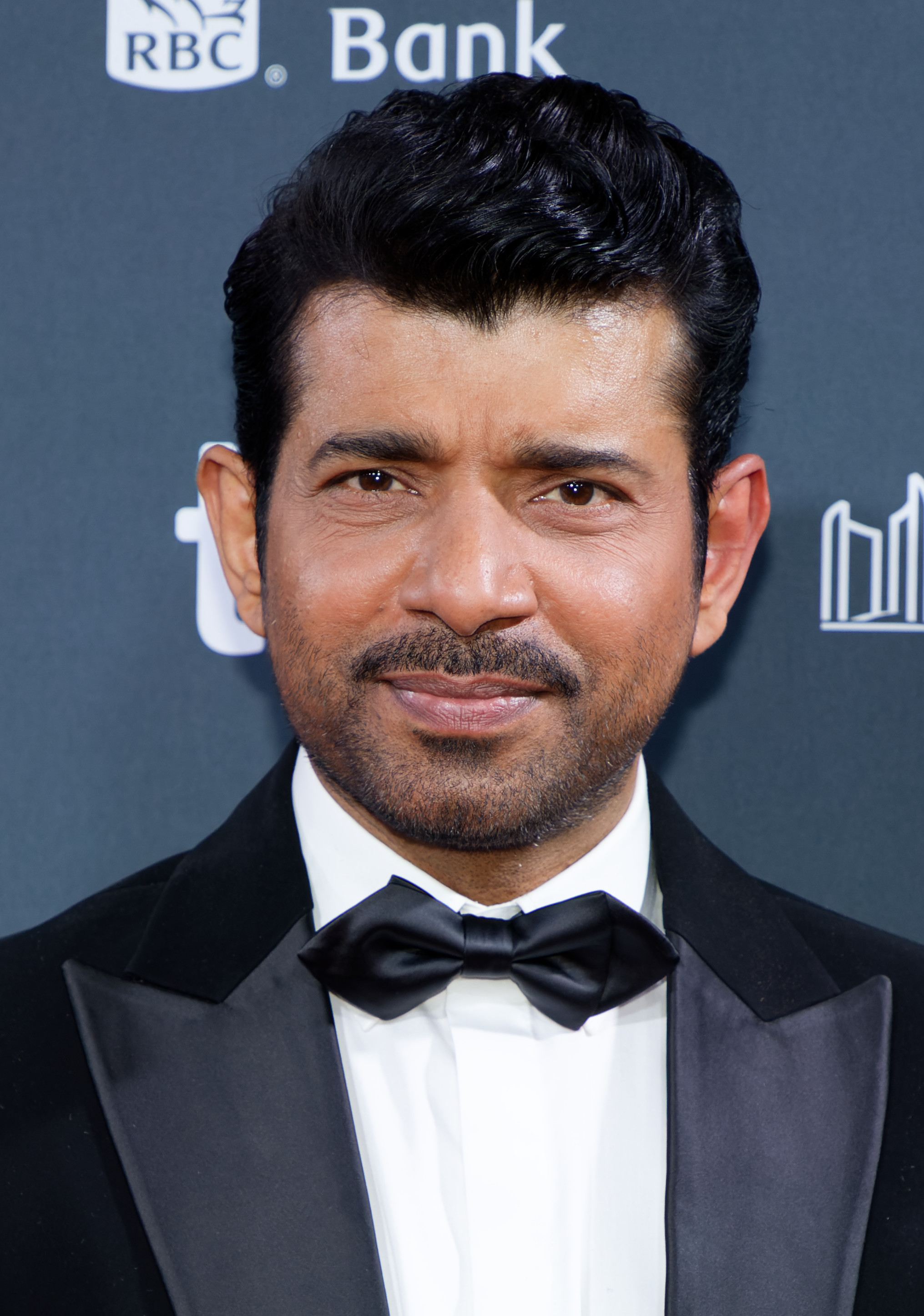
- The 2026 recipient: Vineet Kumar Singh
- Awarded for: Best Performance by an Actor in a Supporting Role
- Country: India
- Presented by: Zee Entertainment Enterprises
- First award: Akshaye Khanna, Border (1998)
- Currently held by: Vineet Kumar Singh, Chaava (2026)
- Website: Zee Cine Awards

The Zee Cine Award Best Actor in a Supporting Role- Male is chosen by a jury organized by Zee Entertainment Enterprises, and the winner is announced only at the ceremony.

Actors Abhishek Bachchan and Anil Kapoor have won the awards thrice while Saif Ali Khan has won the award twice. The most recent recipient is Anil Kapoor.

== Multiple wins ==
Wins	Recipient
4	Anil Kapoor
3	Abhishek Bachchan
2	Saif Ali Khan

== Winners ==
The winners are listed below:-

Year	Actor	Film
1998	Akshaye Khanna	Border
1999	Manoj Bajpai	Satya
2000	Anil Kapoor	Taal
2001	Sunil Shetty	Dhadkan
2002	Saif Ali Khan	Dil Chahta Hai
2003	Vivek Oberoi	Company
2004	Saif Ali Khan	Kal Ho Naa Ho
2005	Abhishek Bachchan	Phir Milenge
2006	Abhishek Bachchan	Sarkar
2007	Abhishek Bachchan	Kabhi Alvida Naa Kehna
2008	Govinda	Partner
2011	Arjun Rampal	Raajneeti
2012	Farhan Akhtar	Zindagi Na Milegi Dobara
2013	Nawazuddin Siddiqui	Talaash
2014	Rajkummar Rao	Kai Po Che
2015	Inaamulhaq	Filmistaan
2016	Sanjay Mishra	Masaan
2017	Rishi Kapoor	Kapoor & Sons
2018	Anil Kapoor	Mubarakan
2019	Vicky Kaushal	Sanju
2020	Soham Majumdar	Kabir Singh
2023	Anil Kapoor	Jugjugg Jeeyo
2024	Anil Kapoor	Animal
2025	Ravi Kishan	Laapataa Ladies
2026	Vineet Kumar Singh	Chhaava

== See also ==
- Zee Cine Awards
- Bollywood
- Cinema of India
