= Zee Cine Award for Best Music Director =

Annual Indian film award

The Zee Cine Award Best Music Director is chosen by the jury and the winner is announced at the actual ceremony. A. R. Rahman has won most awards in this category (6 times).

== Multiple wins ==
| Wins | Recipient |
|---|---|
| 6 | A. R. Rahman |
| 3 | Pritam |
| 2 | Anu Malik, Mithoon |

== Awards ==
Winners
| Year | Music director | Film |
|---|---|---|
| 1998 | Uttam Singh | Dil To Pagal Hai |
| 1999 | Jatin–Lalit | Kuch Kuch Hota Hai |
| 2000 | A. R. Rahman | Taal |
| 2001 | Rajesh Roshan | Kaho Naa... Pyaar Hai |
| 2002 | A. R. Rahman | Lagaan |
| 2003 | Nadeem-Shravan and A. R. Rahman | Raaz and Saathiya |
| 2004 | Himesh Reshammiya | Tere Naam |
| 2005 | Anu Malik | Main Hoon Na |
| 2006 | Shankar–Ehsaan–Loy | Bunty Aur Babli |
| 2007 | A. R. Rahman | Rang De Basanti |
| 2008 | A. R. Rahman | Guru |
| 2011 | Sajid–Wajid | Dabangg |
| 2012 | A. R. Rahman | Rockstar |
| 2013 | Pritam | Cocktail |
| 2014 | Jeet Ganguly, Mithoon & Ankit Tiwari | Aashiqui 2 |
| 2015 | Yo Yo Honey Singh, Himesh Reshammiya, Meet Bros & Anjjan Bhattacharya | Kick |
| 2016 | Anu Malik | Dum Laga Ke Haisha |
| 2017 | Pritam | Ae Dil Hai Mushkil |
| 2018 | Amit Trivedi | Secret Superstar |
| 2019 | Ajay–Atul | Dhadak |
| 2020 | Mithoon, Amaal Mallik, Vishal, Sachet–Parampara, Akhil | Kabir Singh |
| 2023 | Pritam | Brahmāstra: Part One – Shiva |
| 2024 | Anirudh Ravichander | Jawan |
| 2025 | Sachin–Jigar | Stree 2 |
| 2026 | Mithoon | Saiyaara |

== See also ==
- Zee Cine Awards
- Bollywood
- Cinema of India
