= Toby Gough =

British theatre director, writer, actor and teacher

- Born: United Kingdom
- Occupations: Theatre director, Writer, Actor & Teacher

Toby Gough is a British theatre director, writer, actor and teacher. He is known for devising multi-cultural adaptations of Shakespeare plays and creating international music theatre shows from Cuba, Colombia, Ireland, India and Brazil.

His musical theatre productions from India include The Merchants of Bollywood produced by Harvey Goldsmith choreographed by Vaibhavi Merchant, Taj Express choreographed by Shruti Merchant. Bollywood Masala-the Indian Riverdance is choreographed by Mahesh Poojary and pays tribute to the music of A.R.Rahman and the films of Sanjay Leela Bhansali. Irish Celtic-Spirit of Ireland has been on tour since 2011 and has performed to over 300,00 audiences worldwide. Salsa Revolution from Colombia features dancers from Swing Latino, who performed with Shakira and Jennifer Lopez at the 2020 Super Bowl halftime show.

Gough is Director of IFTA (The International Foundation for Training in the Arts) founded by Brian Cox. He is also Director of The World Festival production company that produces shows for the Edinburgh Fringe festival and Singapore Grand Prix.

He has won five Scotsman Fringe First Awards, two Herald Archangel awards, and two Jack Tinker Spirit of the Fringe lifetime achievement awards. The album he co-produced Small things fall from the Baobab Tree by the Zawose family of Tanzania was nominated for a Grammy Award.

== Education ==
Gough went to Charterhouse School, and holds an MA in English Literature from the University of Edinburgh 1989–1994. He studied Theatrical Biomechanics of Meyerhold with Gennady Bogdanov. He is a qualified Padi Divemaster.

== Career ==
Gough works in theatre as a writer, director, producer and actor. He has directed Kylie Minogue in The Caribbean Tempest in The Holders Festival in Barbados. During the Bosnian war, he entered Sarajevo under siege through a sewage tunnel to co-direct the opera Evropa with the Sarajevo Philharmonic Orchestra and the Palcici children's choir.

After the 2004 tsunami in Sri Lanka, Gough created Children of the Sea with child survivors of the disaster which toured to refugee camps across the island and went on to win the first prize at the Edinburgh Festival Fringe.

As a writer and director Gough has created the international touring productions of Linnaeus Prince of Flowers, Brazil! Brazil!, Lady Salsa, Irish Celtic-Spirit of Ireland, The 27 Club-Legends Never Die, Lady Salsa, The Bar at Buena Vista, Havana Rumba, Havana Street Party and Freakout Cabaret at Varieté im Hansa Theater.

Gough has served as a visiting lecturer and theatre practitioner leading workshops in Participatory Theatre for Conflict Transformation, and Devising Theatre in universities and drama schools in the UK and around the world. As a theatre practitioner, he has led educational workshops in eastern and central Africa.

== See also ==
- The Merchants of Bollywood
- Riverside Studios
- Light Years (Kylie Minogue album)
- Vaibhavi Merchant
- Brooke Satchwell
- Denzil Smith
