= Maa Kasam =

Maa Kasam (lit. 'I Swear on My Mother') may refer to:

- Maa Kasam (1985 film), an Indian Hindi-language film directed by Shibu Mittra
- Maa Kasam (1999 film), an Indian Hindi-language film directed by Ashok Gaitwak
