= Ishitta Arun =

Indian actress

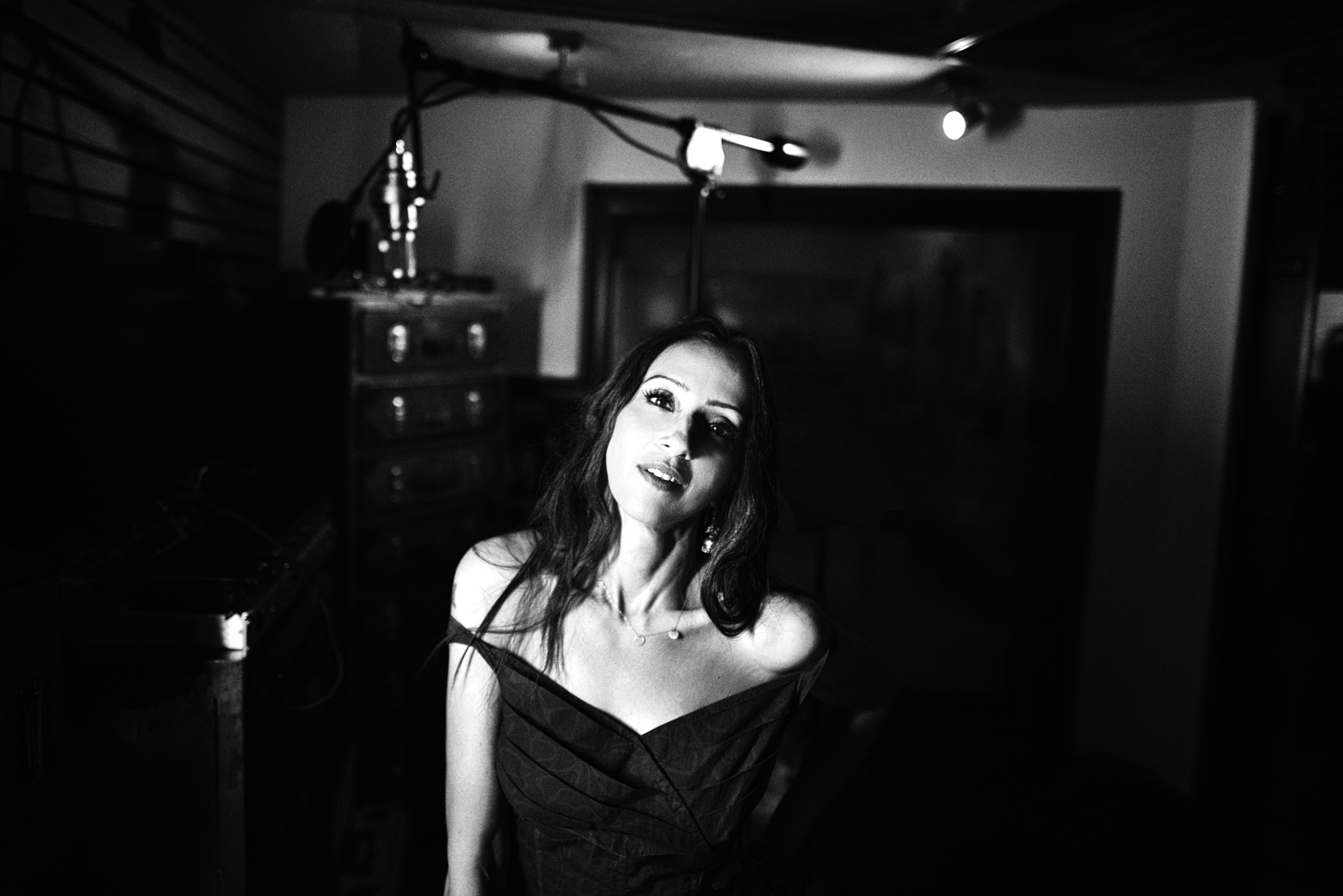
- Occupations: Actress, writer, model, VJ and Producer
- Years active: 1986, 1999–present
- Parent: Ila Arun (mother)

Ishitta Arun is an Indian actress, writer, model, VJ and producer. She is the daughter of the renowned Bollywood folk singer Ila Arun. She is best known for her roles in series like Scoop (2023), Rana Naidu (2023), Good Bad Girl (2022) and the musical The Merchants of Bollywood (2006-2007).

== Career ==
Ishitta made her acting debut in the year 2000 with the film Snegithiye. In 2003, she acted in the film Kahan Ho Tum. Other than this, she has acted in noted projects like Scoop, Rana Naidu and Good Bad Girl.

She is also known for her contributions in theatre. She has acted in multiple theatre plays like The Merchants of Bollywood, Goonj, Mumbai Talkies and Mareechika.

In 2009, she participated as a contestant in the show, Dancing Queen, which aired on Colors TV. In 2010, she participated as a contestant and finished as the second runner up in the NDTV imagine's show Dil Jeetegi Desi Girl. She contributed as a writer and producer in the play Gaa Re Maa. She also wrote the lyrics of the title track for the film Dhaakad, the song "So Ja Re", Coke Studio's "Ae Rab" by Master Saleem and Dhruv Ghanekar, and "I'm Alive" by Atif Aslam and Maher Zain.

== Filmography ==
=== Films ===
Year	Title	Role	Notes
2000	Snegithiye	Geetha Damodaran	Tamil film
2003	Kahan Ho Tum	Mansi	
2004	Stop!	Sonia	
2007	Raakilipattu	Geetha Damodaran	Malayalam film
2024	Khel Khel Mein	Malti Mehra	

=== TV series ===
Year	Title	Role	Notes
1986	Yatra	Child	
2009	Dancing Queen	Contestant	
2010	Dil Jeetegi Desi Girl	Contestant	Second runner up
2022	Good Bad Girl	Dipika	
2023	Rana Naidu	Anna	
2023	Scoop	Naila Siddiqui	
2025	Single Papa	Meenu Minocha	Netflix series

=== Theatre plays ===
Play	Notes
The Merchants of Bollywood	
Gaa Re Maa	Also producer and writer
Goonj	
Mumbai Talkies	
Mareechika	

=== Music videos ===
Year	Song	Singer	Ref.
1999	"Bijuria"	Sonu Nigam	
2002	"Aika Dajiba"	Vaishali Samant	
2006	"Loye Loye"	Nusrat Fateh Ali Khan	
2012	"Lak Tunu Tunu"	Surjit Bindrakhia	

=== As a Lyricist ===
Year	Song	Singer	Notes
2012	"Stay With Me"	Dhruv Voyage	
2015	"Ae Rabb"	Master Saleem, Dhruv Ghanekar	Coke Studio
2015	"I'm Alive"	Atif Aslam, Maher Zane	
2022	"Dhaakad Title Song"	Vasundhara Vee	From the film Dhaakad
2022	"So Ja Re"	Sunidhi Chauhan, Hariharan	From the film Dhaakad
2025	"Hasraton Ke Baazar"	Niranjan Menon	From the film Tehran
