= Manushi Chhillar =

Indian actress and model (born 1997)

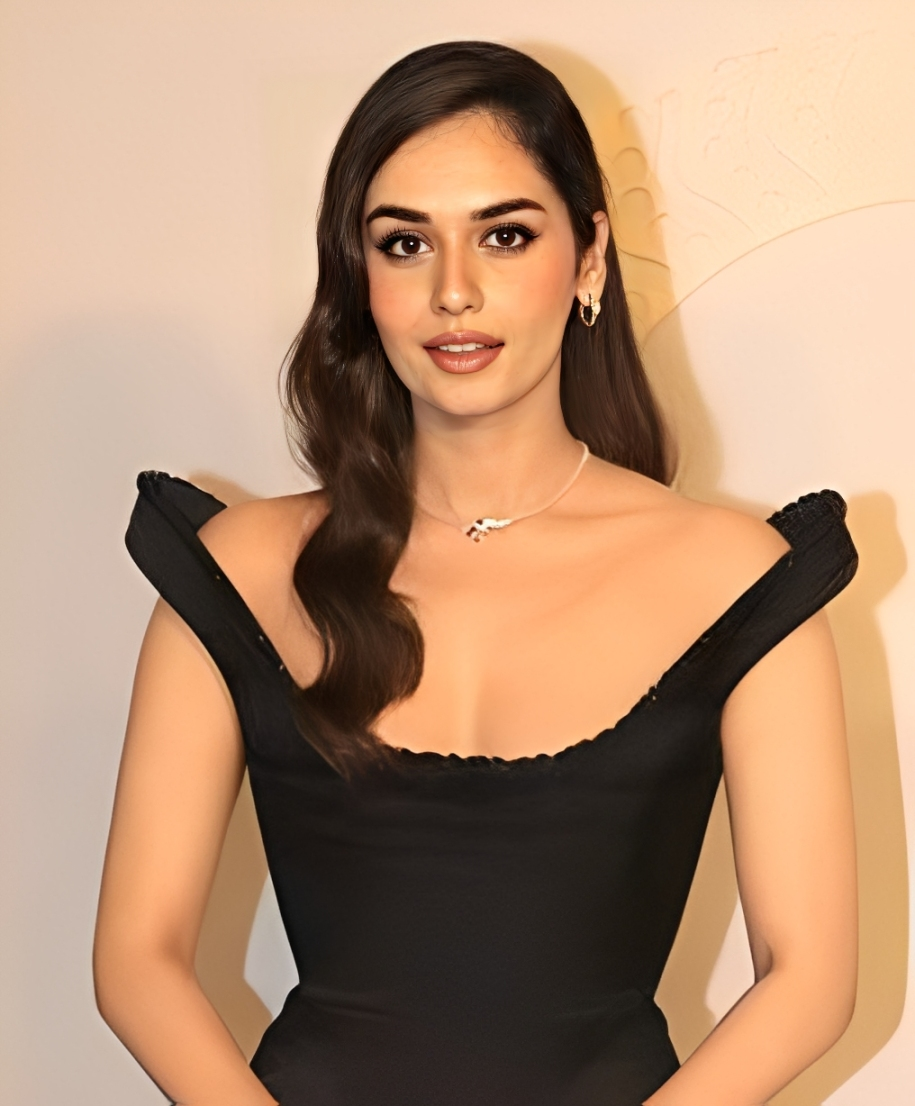
- Chhillar in 2025
- Born: 14 May 1997 (age 29); Rohtak, Haryana, India
- Education: Bhagat Phool Singh Medical College
- Occupations: Model; actress
- Years active: 2017–present
- Height: 1.75 m (5 ft 9 in)
- Title: Femina Miss India 2017; Miss World 2017

Signature
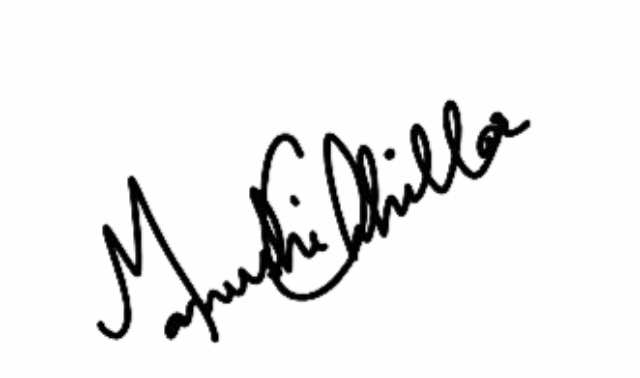

Manushi Chhillar (born 14 May 1997) is an Indian actress, model and the winner of Miss World 2017 pageant. She represented her state of Haryana at the Femina Miss India 2017 pageant and won the title of Femina Miss India World 2017 and then went on to become the sixth Indian to be crowned Miss World after 17 years.

Chhillar made her acting debut with the role of Sanyogita in the historical drama Samrat Prithviraj (2022), and has since appeared in The Great Indian Family (2023) and Bade Miyan Chote Miyan (2024).

== Early life and education ==
Chhillar was born on 14 May 1997 in Rohtak into a Haryanvi family, although her ancestral home is in Bamnoli village of Jhajjar district. Her father, Mitra Basu Chhillar, is a physician who served at the Defence Research and Development Organisation (DRDO) and now practices regenerative medicine at Soma Wellness in Mumbai, while her mother, Neelam Chhillar, is also a medical doctor and departmental head of neurochemistry at the Institute of Human Behaviour and Allied Sciences, New Delhi.

Chhillar studied at St. Thomas' School (New Delhi) and was academically brilliant, having topped the all India CBSE in English subject in class 12, and scored 96 per cent in her boards. She cleared the All India Pre Medical Test (now, NEET) in her first attempt. She was pursuing a medical degree (MBBS) at the Bhagat Phool Singh Medical College in Sonipat.

Chhillar is fluent in Hindi and English, apart from her mother tongue, Haryanvi. She is a trained Kuchipudi dancer, and had acquired her training under Raja and Radha Reddy.

== Pageantry ==
=== Femina Miss India ===
Chhillar ventured into pageantry with Fashion Big Bazaar sponsored Campus Princess 2016, where she was crowned as one of the finalists from All India Institute of Medical Sciences in December 2016. It was conducted by the Miss India Organization. Thereafter, she went on to win the title of Femina Miss India Haryana in April 2017. Chhillar represented the state of Haryana in the annual Femina Miss India contest. During the competition, Chhillar was crowned Miss Photogenic.

Chhillar, as a top 15 semi-finalist was asked by Karan Johar: "The government is considering to ban surrogacy in India. What is your opinion regarding this?"

I feel everyone in the world should have a right to be a parent. So, instead of banning surrogacy in India, the government should focus on preventing its exploitation.

During the final question and answer round of Femina Miss India 2017, the top 5 delegates were asked the same question - "You have spent 30 days with 30 fellow contestants at Femina Miss India. What lesson will you take back with you?", to which Chhillar responded:

These days that I have spent with my fellow contestants has been the most dynamic period of my life. The only thing that was certain during the whole experience was uncertainty. The one belief that I would take back with me is that, yes...I can change the world. When I entered Miss India, there was only passion. However, through this journey, I acquired a vision in life. That vision and the belief that I can change the world, is something I'm going to take back with me.

She later went on to win the contest's main title Femina Miss India World 2017, in the finale event hosted at the Yash Raj Film Studio, on 25 June 2017. By winning, she earned the right to represent India at Miss World 2017.

=== Miss World 2017 ===
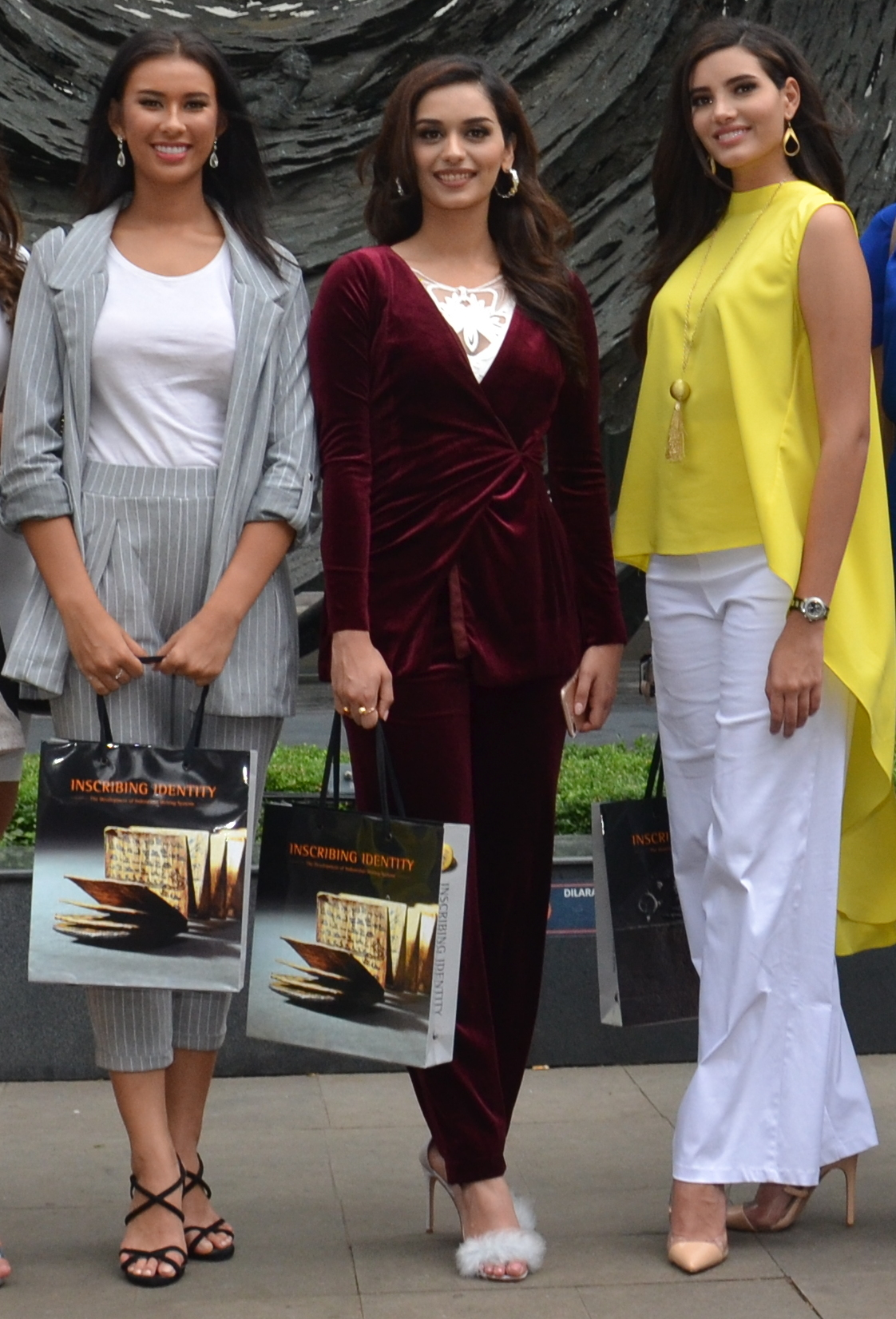
Chhillar (center) together with Miss World Indonesia 2017-Achintya Holte Nilsen (left) and Miss World 2016-Stephanie Del Valle (right) visiting National Museum of Indonesia on 21 February 2018.

Chhillar represented India at Miss World 2017, where she became a finalist in the Top Model, People's Choice, and Multimedia competitions, and was the winner of the Head-to-Head Challenge from Group Nine and co-winner of the Beauty with a Purpose competition. She is India's fourth Beauty with a Purpose winner at Miss World and the first woman to win Miss World and Beauty with a Purpose jointly. Chhillar's Beauty with a Purpose project was titled Project Shakti. The campaign's goal is to spread awareness about menstrual hygiene. She visited about 20 villages for the project and treated over 5,000 women.

During the final question and answer round, Chhillar was asked - "Which profession should receive the highest salary in the world?" Responding to the same, she answered:

Since I am very close to my mother, I think that a mother deserves the highest respect. When you talk about salary, I don't think it's just about cash, but the love and respect that you give to someone. My mother has been the biggest inspiration in my life. All mothers, they just sacrifice so much for their kids. So, I believe the profession which deserves the highest salary, respect and love should be of a mother.

On 18 November 2017, Chhillar was crowned Miss World 2017 by the outgoing titleholder Miss World 2016, Stephanie Del Valle from Puerto Rico in the finals in Sanya, China. She became the sixth Indian woman to win the crown, and the first since Priyanka Chopra, Miss World 2000.

=== Reign as Miss World ===
As Miss World 2017, Chhillar returned to India on 26 November, where she was greeted by a large crowd. She was one of the celebrity speakers at the 2017 Global Entrepreneurship Summit in Hyderabad. Chhillar was announced as the brand ambassador for Anaemia Free Haryana. Her Beauty with a Purpose campaign, 'Project Shakti' was given government aid of ₹18 crore (approximately $2.8 million), ensuring free availability of sanitary napkins for all girls in the government schools of Haryana by Chief Minister of the state Manohar Lal Khattar. She was honoured with the Special Achievement Award at the 2017 CNN-IBN Indian of the Year Awards for winning the Miss World crown. Chhillar was also India's top trending personality on Google search in 2017. She received Proud Maker of India award at Six Sigma Healthcare Leadership Summit 2017 in New Delhi. Chhillar was also a guest speaker at the 10th C4IO by Hewlett-Packard Enterprise at Pushkar. She made an appearance in SET India's television special, Super Nights With Padman to promote her Beauty with a Purpose project on menstrual hygiene, in association with Akshay Kumar's starring film, Pad Man.

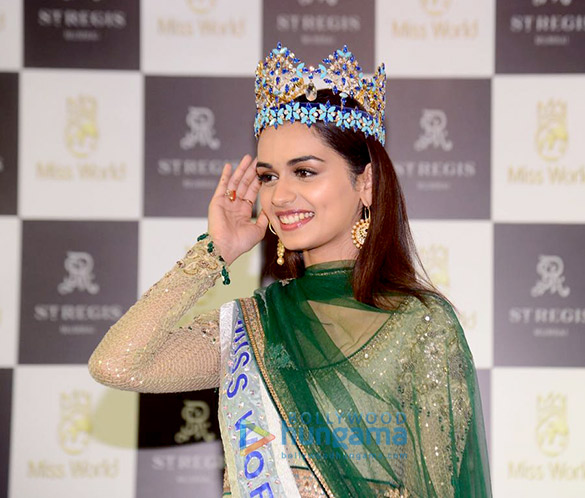
Chhillar's first press conference as Miss World, at the St Regis Hotel, Mumbai.

After her homecoming ceremony, Chhillar's first visit was to London along with Julia Morley, the chairman and CEO of Miss World. They joined the royal honouring ceremony of Marsha Rae Ratcliff OBE, the Past Master of The Worshipful Company of Carmen. Chhillar returned to India and visited the Bennett University in Greater Noida. In a Q&A session organised by the university, she interacted with the faculty and students.

In February 2018, she started the first leg of her Beauty With A Purpose tour with Miss World 2017 continental winners - Magline Jeruto (Africa), Ha Eun Kim (Asia), Annie Evans (Oceania), Stephanie Hill (Europe), Solange Sinclair (Caribbean), Andrea Meza (Americas) and Miss World 2016, Stephanie Del Valle at the 1st global edition of 'Feminine Hygiene Awareness' campaign in Hyderabad in collaboration with Government of Telangana. They continued the campaign at Kolkata, where Bengal Chamber of Commerce and Industry hosted a special adda session on Feminine Hygiene in association with Miss World Beauty With a Purpose world tour team. They visited "New Light" NGO in slum area of Kolkata and also learnt to make low cost biodegradable sanitary pads at the Jute Industries Research Association. The team further worked on spreading awareness about menstruation and ensuring the availability of sanitary pads in rural areas. They joined hands with Aakar Innovations, an NGO that works on the same issue, to create more low cost, biodegradable sanitary napkins. She also visited Mumbai's Dharavi slum for 'Save the Girl Child' event.

Manushi, along with the Miss World team, also met Muppavarapu Venkaiah Naidu, the Vice-President of India, and Sushma Swaraj, Minister of External Affairs, to discuss her beauty with a purpose project. She visited Indian cities Hyderabad, Kolkata, Mumbai and Delhi for her 42-day beauty with a purpose tour. Chhillar then reached Hong Kong city and was later invited by China Central Television to star in the biggest live event Chinese New Year's Gala at China. The Miss World team landed in Indonesia in continuation with the humanitarian tour. During her stay in Indonesia, Manushi visited The Golden Bridge, a Beauty with a Purpose project which was completed by Miss Indonesia 2014, Maria Rahajeng, participated in humanitarian activities and also crowned Miss Indonesia 2018, the representative of Indonesia for Miss World 2018.

After this, Chhillar along with the Miss World team landed in the British Virgin Islands. They met the governor of British Virgin Islands and worked to raise funds for the beauty with the purpose project of Miss British Virgin Islands 2017, Helina Hewlet. She and the Miss World team later attended a gala dinner and auction at the Moorings Mariner Inn. She also attended the second annual ‘Beauty with A Purpose’ (BWAP) philanthropic award. She subsequently visited the United States, where she was a presenter and performer for a 16-hour TV show on channel ABC, the 44th Variety Children's Charity Telethon held in Iowa. She was felicitated at South Asian Women Empowerment gala held on International Women's Day in New York City along with other women achievers and also joined as a presenter for "South Asian Empowerment Awards". The first part of her beauty with a purpose tour ended with her United States visit. After returning to India, she was one of the guest speakers at The Economic Times Women's Forum 2018.

Chhillar visited Brazil in continuation of her humanitarian tour. She visited the Government Palace in the State of São Paulo, where the then- First Lady of the State, teacher Lucia Franca discussed various social projects supported by the state governament with Chhillar. She initiated an awareness program to prevent and fight against leprosy. According to Chhillar, the aim was to teach people about the early signs of the disease and the ways to seek treatment. She also met and interacted with the children from the APAE. She gave a presentation on behalf of the organisation to the then Governor of the Federal District of Brazil, Rodrigo Rollemberg, at the Charity Gala arranged by local branch of APAE. She highlighted the works done by the organisation and requested the Governor to help build a new third floor to the APAE building, so that all the children in the state could be helped. She was invited by Foreign Affairs Chairman, Congressman Nielson Pinto and the National Defense Committee, and was honoured by the Parliament of Brazil for her humanitarian works.

In May 2018, Chhillar reached Manila, Philippines for the press presentation and inauguration of Mister World 2019 contest which was to be venued in the Philippines. Chhillar later reached New Zealand as part of the Beauty with a Purpose campaign. Chhillar, along with the Miss World team visited the Ronald McDonald House in Auckland, and served in the charity house as volunteers. She was named as a judge for the Femina Miss India 2018 contest held on 19 June 2018. She crowned her national successor, Anukreethy Vas at the end of the event.

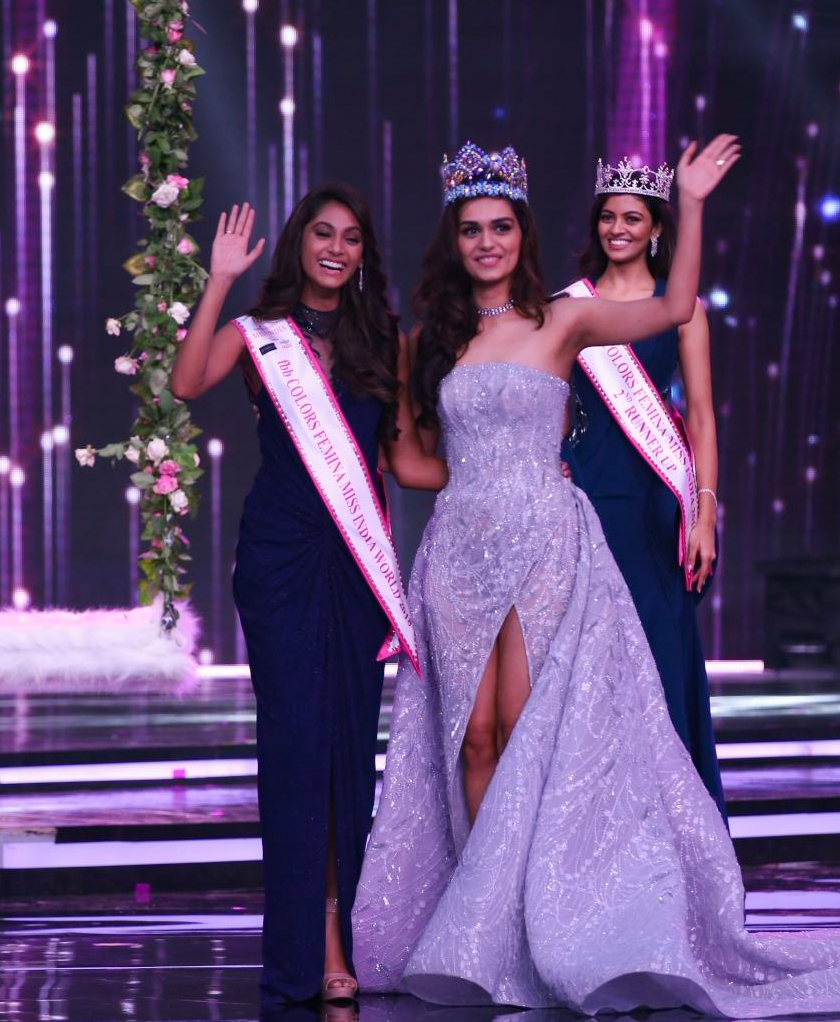
Chhillar (right) with her Miss India successor Anukreethy Vas (left) at the grand finale of Femina Miss India 2018, in NSCI Dome, Mumbai

She then visited South Africa to take her project on menstrual hygiene forward. During the first day of the visit, she along with the Miss World team visited the Metro Radio in Johannesburg to commemorate the Nelson Mandela centenary celebrations. As a result of Chhillar's Beauty With A Purpose Project on feminine hygiene, machines that manufacture low cost and compostable sanitary pads were installed in Nelson Mandela's birthplace Mvezo. The President of South Africa, Cyril Ramaphosa, led the official ceremony of unveiling the first Sanitary Pads Unit, on 18 July 2018, which marked the 100th birth anniversary of Nelson Mandela. Chhillar, along with Miss World 2014, Rolene Strauss, inaugurated the first sanitary pad manufacturing unit set up by them in South Africa. Apart from the launch of the sanitary pad unit, Mandela's birthday was celebrated by handing out more than 200 blankets and winter hats to the elderly at the newly opened 'Nosekeni Nongaphi Health Center'. The Miss World team also donated 100 bicycles to school children in Mvezo, Mandela's home village.

She returned to England and joined Stephanie Hill, Miss World Europe 2017 for the presentation of £15,000 raised by the charity projects of Miss England contestants. It was donated to the Mid Derbyshire Riding School for the disabled. During her reign, she suffered a leg injury and was unable to perform her duties for a month. After her recovery, she landed in Los Angeles, California for Miss World America 2018. Chhillar reached Sri Lanka and met John Amaratunga, the Minister of Tourism Development of Sri Lanka. She later visited the Philippines for the second time to attend the coronation event of Miss World Philippines 2018, as one of the judges. She reached France to attend the presentation event of 'Beauty with a Purpose' documentary in Cannes. Chhillar then visited Sanya, China and was a member of the jury in Miss China World 2018. She inaugurated the 'Haryana Film Policy' in the Indian city of Gurgaon, along with the Chief Minister of Haryana, Manohar Lal Khattar.

Chhillar crowned her successor Vanessa Ponce of Mexico at the end of Miss World 2018, which took place in Sanya, China on 8 December 2018.

== Acting career ==
Chhillar signed a three-film deal contract with Yash Raj Films, and made her debut with Samrat Prithviraj. After several auditions and trails, she was cast in the film as the Princess of Kannauj, Prithviraj's (played by Akshay Kumar) wife. Elaborating her role, Chhillar stated, "It's a huge responsibility to play princess Sanyogita, a powerful personality who stood up for what is right and took the most important decisions of her life herself". The film was a box office failure and her performance received negative reviews from critics.

In 2023, Chhillar appeared in The Great Indian Family, a comedy film backed by the same banner, where she was seen opposite Vicky Kaushal. Chhillar's performance was poorly received by critics, with Sukanya Verma of Rediff.com dismissing her as "strictly ornamental". The film was a commercial failure at the box office.

In 2024, Chhilar portrayed a wing commander opposite Varun Tej in the Hindi-Telugu bilingual, Operation Valentine. Sana Farzeen of India Today noted, "Manushi's sincere performance gets lost in translation due to lacklustre screenplay" and criticised her chemistry. Later in 2024, Chhilar starred in the Akshay Kumar and Tiger Shroff-led Bade Miyan Chote Miyan which received negative reviews and was a box office bomb.

Chillar played a local gangster's wife in Maalik, her first release of 2025 opposite Rajkummar Rao. Anuj Kumar stated that she plays her predictable part well. She will next be seen opposite John Abraham in Dinesh Vijan's Tehran.

== Other work ==
=== Social work ===
In May 2018, Chhillar joined hundreds of women in a 3 km walk through the streets of Delhi to create social awareness on the World Menstrual Hygiene Day. Supporting the Fit India Campaign, Chhillar along with the Vice-President of India, Venkaiah Naidu waved the flag at the starting line to initiate the race, as thousands of cyclists made it to the streets of Delhi celebrating the World Bicycle Day. She is a strong advocate for vegetarianism and has expressed her views on the subject on various platforms.

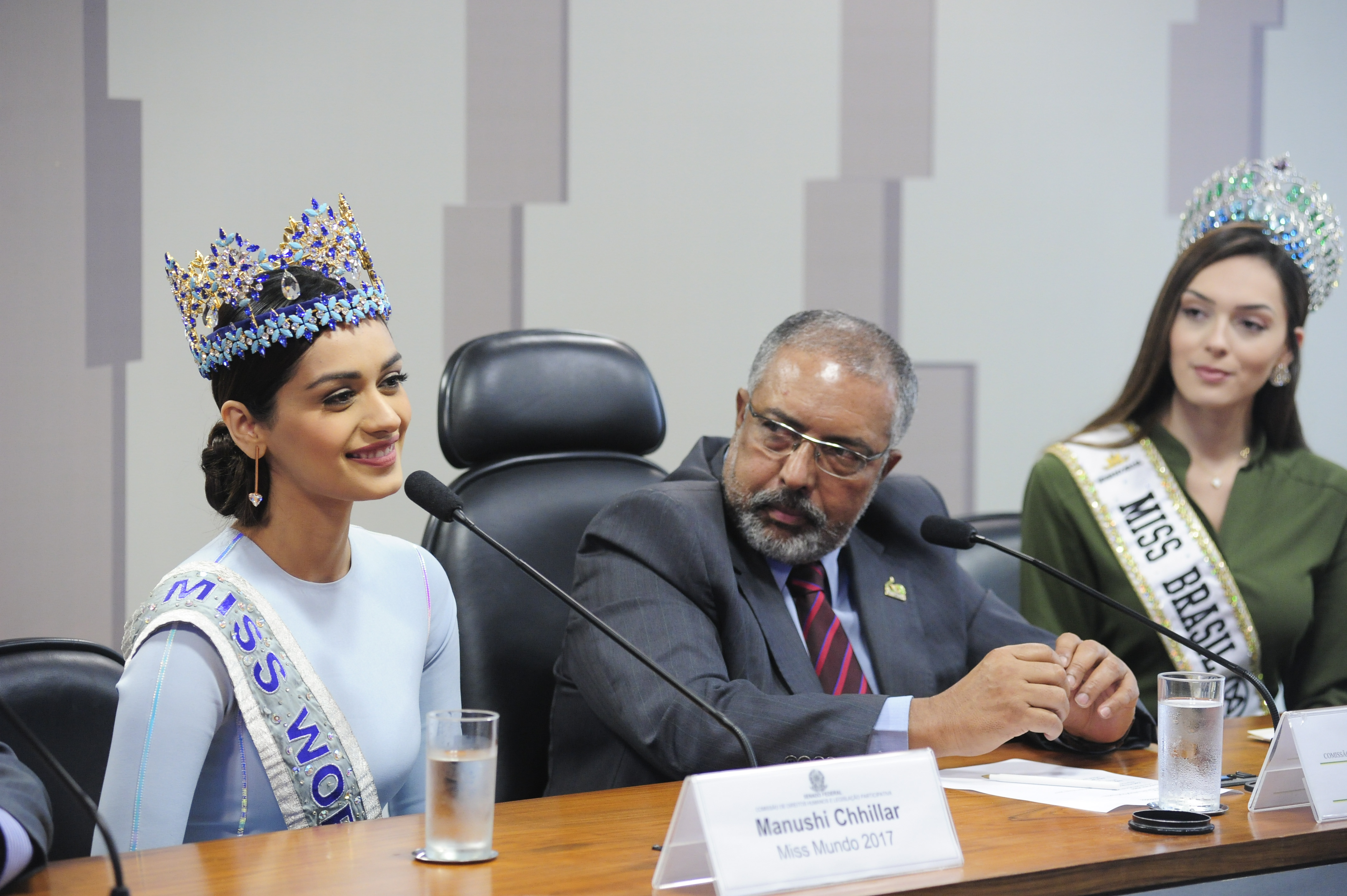
Chhillar at a meeting with Commission on Human Rights and Participatory Legislation (HRC)

Chhillar was appointed as the ambassador for Government of Haryana's campaign to curb Anemia, which was instituted since almost 61 per cent of the women in the state were effected from the disease. She expanded the scope of her Beauty with a Purpose campaign, Project Shakti and initiated awareness programme among rural women for HIV/AIDS in India. On initiating this programme, she expressed:

AIDS awareness among women will be one of the key initiatives of Project Shakti, because I feel women of our country are at risk due to lack of awareness programs. We work with hundreds of women across India and we are looking to educate them about AIDS awareness so that they can convey this message in their respective communities. It is absolutely essential for our country to fight HIV/AIDS and I am looking forward to doing my bit for the cause.

Chhillar collaborated with the UNICEF's campaign to raise awareness on the Coronavirus pandemic. In a video released by UNICEF India, she urged people to stay at home and practice social distancing. Chhillar also urged state governments in India to distribute sanitary pads, along with daily ration to the female migrant workers who were prone to severe risks due to shortage of funds in their hands during the migrant labourers' crisis in India, which arose as a result of the strict lockdown imposed to contain the spread of SARS CoV-2.

In 2021, the United Nations Women affiliated with Chhillar in order to raise awareness regarding gender-based violence. She supports an initiative titled 'Orange the World', and works towards curbing online harassment of women among other forms of harassment, and spreading more awareness pertaining to this issue.

In March 2021, Chhillar along with Dipika Pallikal and Nikhat Zareen, became part of a campaign launched by Adidas called Make A Move, with the vision to encourage and motivate women to overcome psychological and social barriers.

=== Endorsements ===
Chhillar has modelled for brands like Bata, Fashion Big Bazaar, Cinnamon Hotels & Resorts, Gio watches, Club Factory, H&M, Sabyasachi, Schweppes India, Dior, Samsonite, and Jimmy Choo. In April 2018, she was announced as the brand ambassador for the retail jewellery group, Malabar Gold and Diamonds. She has promoted brands like Audi Q5 and Panasonic. She is also the official brand ambassador for Adidas and Pantene in India. In May 2023, she was announced as the brand ambassador for the American multinational cosmetics company, The Estée Lauder Companies.

In 2023, Chhillar was appointed as the global brand ambassador of Gem and Jewellery Export Promotion Council (GJEPC) for promoting India's diamond, gem and jewellery creations to the global diaspora. The Gem and Jewellery Export Promotion Council of India organised an event called “The Ambassador Meet 2023" to showcase finest of Indian jewels to ambassadors of the leading countries of the world, where Chhillar was officially announced as their brand ambassador. In May 2024, Chhillar was announced as the new brand ambassador of Clovia, a premier lingerie, sleep, and personal care brand.

=== Entrepreneurship ===
Chhillar has ventured into entrepreneurship with two notable businesses. She co-founded Soma Wellness, a holistic health and wellness brand, with innovative regenerative therapies that blend advanced science with holistic care.

In 2024, she introduced Dweep, a sustainable and inclusive brand specialising in women's swimwear and resort wear, in collaboration with stylist Sheefa J Gilani.

== In the media ==
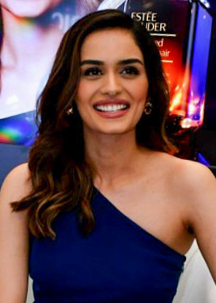
Chhillar at an event in 2022

Subsequent to her win at Miss World, Chhillar received widespread recognition and attention from the media. Chhillar was recognised for her achiements by CNN-IBN, and she was awarded at the 2017 Indian of the Year awards, by the organisation. She was voted as the Most Desirable Woman of India in the 2018 internet survey conducted by Times of India. In 2019, she was named as the 'Sexiest Vegetarian Personality' in India, by PETA. She reacted to the award by expressing, "Being a vegetarian has actually been a way of life for me. My parents were vegetarians and while they gave me a choice, I never felt like I was missing on something. I've always been a vegetarian and have never felt like I needed to change that." In the annual award show organised by Lokmat newspaper, she was named as the most promising Fresh Face in the industry.

In May 2023, Chhillar made her debut at the Cannes Film Festival, where her appearance garnered significant attention, showcasing her evolving journey from pageantry to the film industry.

== Filmography ==
Key
†	Denotes films that have not yet been released

=== Films ===
Year	Title	Role	Notes	Ref(s)
2022	Samrat Prithviraj	Sanyogita		
2023	The Great Indian Family	Jasmeet Kaur Randhawa		
2024	Operation Valentine	Aahna "Eva" Gill	Bilingual film	
2024	Bade Miyan Chote Miyan	Captain Misha Kapoor		
2025	Maalik	Shalini		
2025	Tehran	Divya Rana		

=== Television ===
Year	Title	Role	Notes	Ref.
63rd Filmfare Awards	Herself/Performer			
Super Night with Padman	Herself	Awareness program by SET India		

=== Music videos ===
Year	Song	Singer	Songwriter(s)	Features	Ref
2025	Kufar	Diljit Dosanjh	Music: MixSingh Lyrics: Raj Ranjodh	Diljit Dosanjh	
2026	Sharab	Himesh Reshammiya	Music: Rajat Nagpal; Lyrics: Rana Sotal	Himesh Reshammiya	

== Accolades ==
=== Film awards ===
Year	Award	Category	Work	Result	Ref.
2023	68th Filmfare Awards	Best Female Debut	Samrat Prithviraj	Nominated	

=== Other awards and recognition ===
Year	Association	Category	Result	Ref.
2017	CNN-IBN Indian of the Year	Special Achievement	Won	
2019	Lokmat Stylish Awards	Fresh Face	Won	
2022	Pinkvilla Style Icons Awards	Super Stylish Emerging Talent (Female)	Won	
2023	Bollywood Hungama Style Icons	Most Stylish Trailblazer	Nominated	

=== Media titles ===
Year	Awarding Organisation	Title	Ref.
2017	The Times of India	Most Desirable Woman of India	
2019	PETA	India's Hottest Vegetarian	

== See also ==
- List of Indian film actresses
- List of Hindi film actresses

Awards and achievements
Preceded by (Puerto Rico) Stephanie Del Valle	Miss World; 2017	Succeeded by (Mexico) Vanessa Ponce
Preceded by Priyadarshini Chatterjee	Femina Miss India; 2017	Succeeded by Anukreethy Vas
