= Kathputli =

Kathputli may refer to:

- Kathputli (puppetry), a form of string marionette (puppet art) aboriginal to the Indian state of Rajasthan
- Kathputli (1957 film), 1957 Indian Hindi-language film starring Balraj Sahni and Vyjayanthimala
- Kathputli (1971 film), 1971 Indian Hindi-language film by Brij Sadanah, starring Jeetendra and Mumtaz
- Kathputli (TV series), 2016 Pakistani television series
- Katputtli, a 2006 Indian film
- Cuttputlli (stylization of Kathputli), 2022 Indian thriller film by Ranjit M. Tewari
