= Dancing Queen (2008 Indian TV series) =

Indian dance reality series

- Dhamaka Dance Ka
- Genre: Reality competition
- Presented by: Shabbir Ahluwalia
- Starring: Anita Hassanandani
- Judges: Jeetendra; Hema Malini; Liza Malik
- Country of origin: India
- Original language: Hindi
- No. of seasons: 1
- No. of episodes: 26

Production
- Producer: Sandip Ssingh
- Cinematography: Surinder Rao Asst Nitesh Choudhary
- Camera setup: Multi-camera
- Running time: 24 minutes
- Production company: SOL

Original release
- Network: Colors TV
- Release: 12 December 2008 – 7 March 2009

Dancing Queen is an Indian dance reality competition television series which aired on Colors TV from 12 December 2008 to 7 March 2009.

== Concept ==
The series consists of 10 female celebrities (film and television) who are paired with an aspirant who shall be her partner and protégé throughout the show and whom she will have to mentor. Each week, these jodis will perform before the judges to receive their scores and the audience votes through SMS.

== Cast ==
=== Host ===
- Shabbir Ahluwalia

=== Judges ===
- Jeetendra
- Hema Malini
- Liza Malik

== Contestants ==
Following is a list of contestants with their partners:

- Anita Hassanandani - Sonali Nirantar
- Barkha Bisht Sengupta - Taranjeet Kaur
- Bruna Abdullah - Priya Gamre
- Deepshikha Nagpal - Liza Malik
- Ishitta Arun - Anjali Azad
- Meghna Naidu - Moon Das
- Mink Brar- Ada
- Sambhavna Seth - Shamaayal (WINNER)
- Sanober Kabir - Mrigya Saklani
- Shweta Menon - Bhoomika Zaver
- Shweta Salve - Aashnay (WILDCARD)

== Elimination chart ==
Legend
SF/Semi-Finals	Highest Votes	Danger Zone	Eliminated (Out)	SF/Semi-Finals

Elimination Round:		1	2	3	4	5	6	7	SF1	SF2	Grand-Finale
Place	Contestant	Result
1	Sambhavna Seth - Shamaayal	HV				HV	HV				Winner
2	Sanober Kabir - Mrigya Saklani	DZ	DZ		DZ		DZ				Runner-Up
3	Anita Hassanandani - Sonali Nirantar		DZ	HV	HV	DZ	DZ	HV	HV	Out
4	Ishita Arun - Anjali Azad			DZ	DZ			DZ	Out
5	Shweta Salve - Aashnay	Entered in ER 6						Out
6	Deepshikha Nagpal - Liza Malik			DZ		DZ	Out
7	Mink Brar - Ada		HV		DZ	Out
8	Bruna Abdullah - Priya Gamre	DZ	DZ	DZ	Out
9	Meghna Naidu - Moon Das	DZ		Out
10	Shweta Menon - Bhoomika Zaver	DZ	Out
11	Barkha Bisht Sengupta - Taran Jeet Kaur	Out
