= Operation Valentine (film) =

- Theatrical release poster
- Directed by: Shakti Pratap Singh Hada
- Screenplay by: Shakti Pratap Singh Hada; Aamir Nahid Khan; Siddharth Rajkumar
- Dialogues by: Telugu: Sai Madhav Burra; Hindi: Vaibhav Vishal; Aamir Nahid Khan
- Produced by: Sandeep Mudda
- Starring: Varun Tej; Manushi Chhillar; Mir Sarwar
- Cinematography: Hari K. Vedantam
- Edited by: Naveen Nooli
- Music by: Mickey J. Meyer
- Production companies: Sony Pictures International Productions; Renaissance Pictures
- Distributed by: Sony Pictures Releasing International
- Release date: 1 March 2024
- Running time: 130 minutes
- Country: India
- Languages: Telugu; Hindi

Operation Valentine is a 2024 Indian action drama film based on the 2019 Pulwama Attack and the retaliatory Balakot Air Strikes of 2019 by the Indian Air Force directed by Shakti Pratap Singh Hada, in his directorial debut, and produced by Sony Pictures Films India and Sandeep Mudda, with co-production by God Bless Entertainment and Nandkumar Abbineni. It was shot simultaneously in Telugu and Hindi. It stars Varun Tej, Manushi Chhillar, and Mir Sarwar with Navdeep in a cameo appearance. It marks the Hindi film debut of Tej and the Telugu film debut for Chhillar. The film was released in theaters worldwide on 1 March 2024 to mixed reviews from critics and audiences.

== Cast ==
- Varun Tej as Wing Commander Arjun "Rudra" Dev
- Manushi Chhillar as Wing Commander Aahna "Eva" Gill
- Navdeep as Wing Commander Kabir (cameo appearance)
- Paresh Pahuja as Squadron Leader Yash "Anvil" Sharma
- Ruhani Sharma as Squadron Leader Tanya "Hammer" Sharma
- Mir Sarwar as Kamran
- Shataf Figar as Air Marshal Rajeev Bakshi
- Sampath Raj as Air commodore Mayank Mhatre
- Vaibhav Tatwawadi as Group Captain Aakhtyar "Shaheen" Khan
- Ashwath Bhatt as Pakistani Army General Mushtaq Ahmed
- Ali Reza as Rishi
- Abhinav Gomatam as Dhruv
- Anish Kuruvilla as Indian Security Advisor
- Srikanth Iyengar as Indian Military Head
- Sameer as Indian Naval Head

== Production ==
Completing its third schedule on 14 August 2023, the makers officially revealed its title as Operation Valentine. This bilingual project is set for a release in both Telugu and Hindi.

On 19 October 2023, the makers announced principal photography of the film was wrapped up.

== Soundtrack ==
The soundtrack and background score were composed by Mickey J. Meyer. Saregama acquired the audio rights. The film's first single, "Vande Mataram," was unveiled at the Wagah Border.

== Release ==
It was originally scheduled for a theatrical release on 8 December 2023, but was rescheduled to 16 February 2024, owing to a delay in post-production work. Later, the film was released on 1 March 2024 in theaters worldwide.

The film's post-theatrical streaming rights were acquired by Amazon Prime Video, and the film started streaming on Prime from 22 March 2024.

== Reception ==
Operation Valentine received mixed reviews from critics and audiences.

Arjun Menon of Rediff.com gave 3/5 stars and notes "Operation Valentine follows the templates of similar air force narratives to deliver some rousing, harmless fun time."

Paul Nicodemus of The Times of India also rated 3.0 out of 5 stars and stated that "Operation Valentine is a respectful nod to the bravery of the Indian Air Force, offering audiences a mix of action, patriotism, and drama. While it may not reach the emotional or cinematic heights of its preceding aerial combat and air force films, it remains a decent watch for its spirited portrayal of heroism and sacrifice in the face of adversity."

Sangeetha Devi Dundoo of The Hindu writes that the writing "fails to offer anything new", with an underwritten relationship between the lead actors, and forgettable characters. Raghu Bandi of The Indian Express gave the film 1.5/5 stars, writing that the film "lacks a human story", "graphic work appears patchy" and production values leave a lot to be desired", while praising Varun Tej's performance. The New Indian Express gave the film 2/5 stars, criticising the writing, stating that it "doesn’t have the novelty or invention to grab our attention". The review displays disappointment with Varun Tej's acting, calling it discomforting, while remarking that Chhillar brings "a certain understated intensity to her character" despite the poorly-written role.

== See also ==
- Fighter, another 2024 Indian film with a similar theme
