= Punnu Brar =

German Entrepreneur, Founder/Chairman, Producer, Musician, Singer, Director

- Born: Punnu Singh Brar; 28 January 1985 (age 41); Frankfurt, Germany
- Occupations: Entrepreneur, Founder/Chairman, Producer, Director, Musician, Singer
- Years active: 2006–present
- Known for: Katputli, Damadamm!
- Height: 6 ft 1 in (185 cm)
- Relatives: Mink Brar (sister)

Punnu Brar (28 January 1985) is a German entrepreneur, producer, director, musician, and singer. Punnu is known for writing, producing and funding the feature film Katputtli and for singing in Damadamm! shows. He is also the founder/chairman of Androtech Pvt.Ltd and Bro and Sis Productions (production house).

== Early years ==
Punnu was born on 28 January 1985 in Frankfurt, Germany to Punjabi parents who migrated from India to Germany. He was raised in Germany. He received his education from Germany and completed a bachelor's degree in business management from Heidlberg University.

== Films ==
He funded, produced and written a movie starring his sister mink brar and many others, named Katputtli.

== Bro and Sis Productions ==
In 2006, Punnu Brar turned into a producer and started a production house called Bro and Sis Productions with his sister Mink Brar. Mink said in an interview, "Be it films, serials or even event management, we are ready. Bro and Sis Productions will be a complete entertainment house." Their first major work was the movie Katputtli, which was released in August 2006, in which Mink played the lead role. The production company is presently producing an untitled project.

== Music videos ==
Punnu Brar has Produced, Directed and given music for a Music Video called “Ghoonghat Mix” starring Mink Brar. "Rakhane” official video was the second innings by Punnu Brar followed by “Can you see me” official video and recently “Haye Laggi” official video.

== Personal life ==
Punnu was raised in a conservative and protective environment, with his family implementing traditional Indian values instead of western morales. His immediate family consists of his mother and sister named Mink Brar, who is four years younger to him.
