= Yamraaj =

- Directed by: Rajiv Babbar
- Written by: Rajiv Babbar
- Produced by: Rajiv Babbar
- Starring: Mithun Chakraborty; Jackie Shroff Mink
- Cinematography: V Durga Prasad
- Music by: Anand-Milind
- Distributed by: Aabha Films
- Release date: 31 July 1998
- Country: India
- Language: Hindi

Yamraaj is a 1998 released Indian action film directed by Rajiv Babbar, starring Mithun Chakraborty and Jackie Shroff. The film was released on 31 July 1998 under the banner of Aabha Films.

== Plot ==
Yamraaj is the story of two thieves, Birju and Krishna, who dream of becoming the biggest dons like their mentor, the city's biggest don Raghuraj Singh, also called "Yamraaj". Krishna's conscience starts troubling him as he assassinates an honest Police Officer Hamid Khan. He decides to start a new life, but Birju refuses to change as he is obsessed with his dream. Their difference in opinion leads to conflict between them, resulting in separation. Birju pursues his dream, while Krishna tries to repent for his crime. Whether Birju changes for good or becomes Yamraaj forms the Climax.

== Cast ==
- Mithun Chakraborty as Birju
- Jackie Shroff as Krishna
- Sneha as Nisha
- Mink as Asha
- Prem Chopra as Inspector Dharamveer
- Kiran Kumar as Inspector Hamid Khan
- Gulshan Grover as Raghuraj Singh / Yamraaj
- Aruna Irani as Tulsi Bharadwaj
- Ashish Vidyarthi as Raja
- Jack Gaud as Rampal
- Gavin Packard as Anthony D'Costa
- Kasam Ali as Kasam Jaichand
- Asha Sharma as Hamid’s mother
- Shama Deshpande as Shama
- Deepak Shirke
- Vikas Anand as Fakir
- Chandrakant Gokhale
- Shehzad Khan
- Gaurav Pareek
- Master Mazahar
- Master Rashid
- Master Vishal
- Altaf Raja as Singer in song "Hum Hain Aise Chore"
- Parveen Saba as Singer in song "Chabaake Panwa Tune"

== Soundtrack ==
| # | Title | Singer(s) |
|---|---|---|
| 1 | "Ude Ude Hain" | Sudesh Bhosle, Shweta Shetty |
| 2 | "Hae Hae Mere Dil Ki" | Jaspinder Narula, Lakha Singh |
| 3 | "Hum Karenge Aish" | Udit Narayan, Vinod Rathod, Bela Sulakhe |
| 4 | "Hum Hain Aise Chore" | Altaf Raja |
| 5 | "Sun Mere Beta" | Habib Sabri |
| 6 | "Chabaake Panwa Tune" | Zahid Naazam, Parveen Saba |
