= Samir Soni =

Indian actor (born 1968)

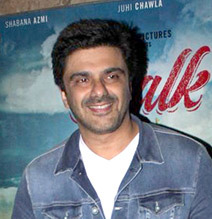
- Soni in 2016
- Born: September 29, 1968 (age 58)
- Years active: 1995–present
- Spouses: Rajlakshmi Khanvilkar (m. 1996; div. 1997) Neelam Kothari (m. 2011)
- Children: 1

Samir Soni is an Indian film and television actor, director and former fashion model.

== Career ==
Soni made his debut in the Hindi serial Samandar. In 1996, he appeared as Ashok Mathur in Doordarshan's A Mouthful Of Sky. He made his film debut in China Gate (1998), which was followed by cameo appearances. In 2003, Soni appeared in the film Baghban and played lead roles in Basti and Kahan Ho Tum. Also that year, Soni also worked in the television series Jassi Jaissi Koi Nahin. In 2004, he worked in Saaksshi. Soni featured as a contestant in the reality television show Bigg Boss 4 in 2010.

Soni played the lead role in Ekta Kapoor's Indian soap opera Parichay - Nayee Zindagi Kay Sapno Ka (2013), which earned him the Indian Telly Award for Best Actor, and ITA Award for Best Actor - Drama (Popular) in 2012.

In 2018, he debuted as a film director with My Birthday Song, starring Sanjay Suri.

== Personal life ==
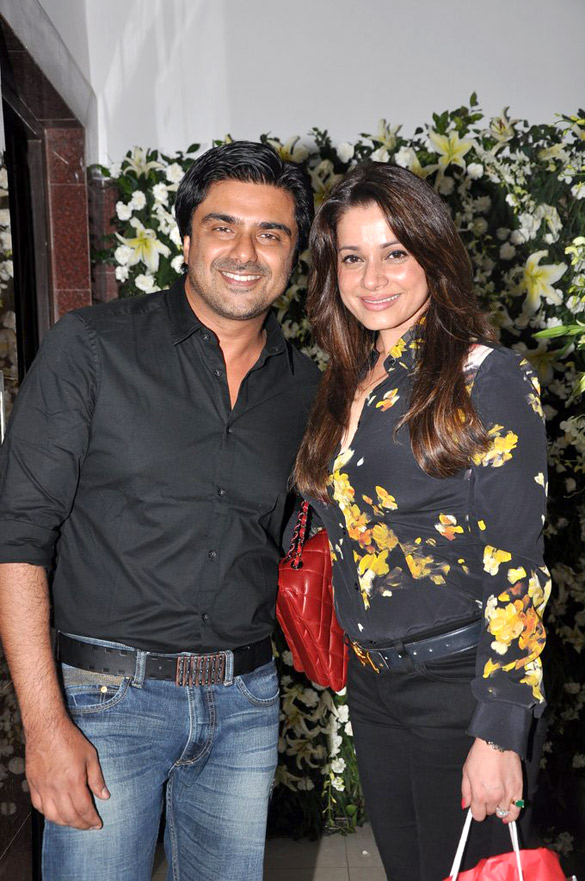
Sameer Soni with wife Neelam Kothari Soni in 2012

Through modeling, he met Rajlakshmi Khanvilkar. The two were married for six months before they divorced. He was in a relationship with Nafisa Joseph and got engaged to her. The engagement lasted two years before they broke up. On 24 January 2011, he married former actress Neelam Kothari. Together they adopted a daughter.

== Filmography ==
=== As actor ===
Year	Film	Role	Ref.
1998	China Gate	Uditanshu Tandon	
2001	Lajja	Manish	
2002	Kabhie Tum Kabhie Hum	Sameer Shastri	
2003	Kahan Ho Tum	Jai	
2003	Basti	Ramesh "Rama" Kulkarni	
2003	Baghban	Sanjay Malhotra	
2004	Dance Like a Man	Vishal	
2006	Vivah	Sunil Harishchandra Bajpyee	
2007	Dosh		
2008	Fashion	Rahul Arora	
2010	I Hate Luv Storys	Veer Kapoor	
2011	Alibaug		
2013	I, Me Aur Main	Agastya	
2016	Chalk n Duster	Sunil Thakur	
2018	Batti Gul Meter Chalu	SPTL Head	
2019	Student of the Year 2	Principal	
2021	Mumbai Saga	Sunil Khaitan	
2021	The Big Bull	Sanjiv Kohli	
2021	State of Siege: Temple Attack	CM Choksi	
2021	Chehre	G. S. Oswal	
2022	Nikamma	Raman Singh	
2026	Jab Khuli Kitaab	Param	

=== As Director ===
Year	Title	Notes
2018	My Birthday Song	Also producer

=== Television ===
Year	Show	Role
1995	Samandar	Navy officer
1996	A Mouthful of Sky	Ashok Mathur
1999-2000	Hello Friends	Samir
2003–2005	Jassi Jaissi Koi Nahin	Purab Mehra
2004	Saaksshi	Shekhar Sengupta
2005	Kumkum - Ek Pyara Sa Bandhan	Advocate Yash Thakur
2010	Bigg Boss 4	Contestant
2011–2013	Parichay	Advocate Kunal Chopra
2013–2014	Khauff Begins	JD
2015	Darr Sabko Lagta Hai	Vijay

=== Web series ===
Year	Title	Role
2017	Bewafaa sii Wafaa	Sumer Singh Bajaj
2018	Toothbrush	Vinod
2019	Puncch Beat	Rajbir Chaudhary
2020–present	Fabulous Lives of Bollywood Wives	Himself
2021	Cartel	Dorabjee
2023	Made in Heaven	Gullu
2023	P I Meena	Dr. Nair

== Accolades ==
Year	Show	Award	Category	Result
2012	Parichay			
2012	Parichay	Indian Telly Awards	Best Actor (Popular)	Won
2012	Parichay	Indian Telly Awards	Best Onscreen Couple (along with Keerti Nagpure)	Nominated
2012	Parichay	Boroplus Gold Awards	Best Actor (Jury)	Won
2012	Parichay	Indian Television Academy Awards	Best Actor (Popular)	Won
2012	Parichay	People's Choice Awards India	Favourite Drama Actor	Nominated
