= Samandar (TV series) =

- Starring: See below
- Music by: Col (Dr) Sultan Singh Malik
- Original language: Hindi
- No. of seasons: 1
- No. of episodes: 25

Production
- Producer: Wing Commander Anup Singh Bedi VSM (Ret.)

Original release
- Network: DD National
- Release: 1995 – 1996

Samandar is an Indian television series that was broadcast on the Doordarshan network from 1995 to 1996. The 25-episode series depicted members of the Indian Navy. It was produced by Wing Commander Anup Singh Bedi VSM (Ret.), supported by known musician/singer Col (Dr) Sultan Singh Malik from the Indian Army.

The cast included Bollywood and Indian television personalities such as Vineeta Malik, Samir Soni, Girish Malik, Aman Verma and others, with special appearances by real Indian Navy officers. The visuals included manoeuvres from and pictures of Indian Naval fleet.

== Cast ==
- Vineeta Malik
- Samir Soni
- Girish Malik
- Aman Verma

== Music ==
The title song of the show "Samandar ki hasin lehron ke kaamil hukmaraan hain hum...", by composer/singer Col S S Malik. Malik sang the title number composed as martial music with a motivating beat. The title song took the TRP of Samandar to most popular list in 1995–96.
