= The Great Indian Family =

2023 Indian film by Vijay Krishna Acharya

- Theatrical release poster
- Directed by: Vijay Krishna Acharya
- Written by: Vijay Krishna Acharya
- Produced by: Aditya Chopra
- Starring: Vicky Kaushal; Manushi Chhillar; Manoj Pahwa; Kumud Mishra
- Cinematography: Ayananka Bose
- Edited by: Charu Shree Roy
- Music by: Songs: Pritam; Score: Kingshuk Chakravarty
- Production company: Yash Raj Films
- Distributed by: Yash Raj Films
- Release date: 22 September 2023
- Running time: 112 minutes
- Country: India
- Language: Hindi
- Budget: ₹40 crore
- Box office: ₹5.65 crore

The Great Indian Family is a 2023 Indian Hindi-language comedy drama film written and directed by Vijay Krishna Acharya and produced by Aditya Chopra under the banner of Yash Raj Films. It stars Vicky Kaushal as a religious, Hindu Pandit who is revealed to be Muslim by birth. Manushi Chhillar, Manoj Pahwa, and Kumud Mishra appear in supporting roles. The core plot and concept of the film shows similarity with Rabindranath Tagore's novel Gora, though presented in a much more commercial way and not credited anywhere related to the film.

The film was released theatrically on 22 September 2023 and received mixed-to-negative reviews from critics, emerging as a box-office bomb.

== Plot ==
The film begins with the backstory of Ved Vyas Tripathi from his school days. He has a crush on a girl in his school, called Aishwarya. She is the daughter of a famous businessman, Maalpani, who invites Ved to her birthday party. Unbeknownst to him, her father has a different plan. He has invited Ved's father, who's a Hindu priest, to sing a bhajan at Aishwarya's birthday puja. Ved surprises everyone at the party by suddenly singing a bhajan.

From that day on, Ved becomes a famous religious singer as "Bhajan Kumar". He is a bachelor, and because of his religious personality, all the girls look at him as a priest, and ask for his blessings. He follows a girl called Jasmeet into the area of the local Muslim community and finds out that Jasmeet is a singer. When he unknowingly scares off their musician Abdul, Jasmeet forces them to perform at singing event, where Ved takes the stage. Ved goes on a coffee date with Jasmeet. There is a big wedding (Aishwarya's) for which Siyaram Tripathi (Ved's father) and Mishra are competing to get the priest contract. While Tripathi goes on a religious trip for 2 weeks, a person delivers a letter at his home. The letter says that Ved is not Tripathi's son, and that he is, in fact, a Muslim. Ved's eyes has lined with pitch-black kohl and also Ved has dressed up as a Muslim: green Kurta Pyjama, his Taqiyah and his kohl-lined eyes. While Ved's uncle tries to protect their family's respect, Mishra tries to ruin Ved and his family's image. Siyaram discloses the truth about Ved's identity and the whole family stands together to support Ved.

During the climax, Ved has his blood test done but sees the discomfort of his father and confesses that he was indeed born a Muslim but his upbringing made him a Hindu. He then gives a monologue on how everyone is the same and discrimination is bad. He also exposes Mishra and his son TD (Tulsidas). In the end, Ved is proud of his "The Great Indian Family".

== Cast ==
- Vicky Kaushal as Ved Vyas Tripathi a.k.a. Bhajan "Billu" Kumar
- Manushi Chhillar as Jasmeet Kaur Randhawa
- Manoj Pahwa as Balakram Tripathi
- Kumud Mishra as Pandit Siyaram Tripathi
- Yashpal Sharma as Pandit Jagannath Mishra
- Sadiya Siddiqui as Hema Tripathi
- Alka Amin as Sushila Kumari
- Srishti Dixit as Gunja Tripathi
- Bharti Perwani as Rampyari Singh Chauhan
- Bhuvan Arora as Bhaata Mishra
- Aasif Khan as Tulsidas "TD" Mishra
- Ashutosh Ujjwal as Sarveshwar Malpani
- Moumita Pal as Sumitra Tripathi
- Paritosh Sand as Mr. Malpani
- Meena Malhotra as Mrs. Malpani
- Fahad Samar as Mr. Ahuja
- Aparna Ghoshal as Mrs. Ahuja
- Rudraksh Thakur as Neeraj
- Hitesh Arora as Abdul
- Renuka Sharma as Amma
- Vedant Sinha as Kid VV (Ved Vyas Tripathi)
- Areebah Fatima as Kid Gunja Tripathi
- Jiya Amin as Kid Aishwarya Malpani
- Tarun Kumar as Maulvi
- Devang Tanna as Pintu Shukla
- Keval Arora as Dr. Irani
- Ghanshyam Garg as Raghubir Yadav
- Sumit Singh Bhadoriya as Amit Ahuja
- Saloni Khanna as Aishwarya Malpani

== Production ==
Principal photography commenced on 20 November 2020. Production wrapped on 25 February 2021.

== Music ==
The Great Indian Family

Soundtrack album by Pritam
- Released: 15 September 2023
- Recorded: 2020–21
- Studio: Yash Raj Studio
- Genre: Feature film soundtrack
- Length: 15:19
- Language: Hindi
- Label: YRF Music
- Producers: Meghdeep Bose; AM. AN; Prasad Sasthe; Aditya Dev

Pritam chronology
Rocky Aur Rani Kii Prem Kahaani (2023)	The Great Indian Family (2023)	Tiger 3 (2023)

Official audio
- The Great Indian Family - Full Album on YouTube

The music of the film is composed by Pritam. All lyrics are written by Amitabh Bhattacharya. The first single titled "Kanhaiya Twitter Pe Aaja" was released on 30 August 2023.

Track listing
No.	Title	Singer(s)	Length
1.	"Kanhaiya Twitter Pe Aaja"	Nakash Aziz	4:45
2.	"Ki Farak Painda Hai"	Dev Negi, Neeti Mohan, Badshah	3:02
3.	"Sahibaa"	Darshan Raval, Antara Mitra	3:56
4.	"Pukaroon Hari Om"	Sonu Nigam	3:36
Total length:			15:19

== Release ==
=== Theatrical ===
The film was theatrically released on 22 September 2023.

=== Home media ===
The film premiered on Amazon Prime Video on 17 November 2023. The film premiered on Star Gold Network on 18 February 2024.

== Reception ==
=== Critical response ===
On the review aggregator website Rotten Tomatoes, 45% of 11 critics' reviews are positive, with an average rating of 5.2/10.

Bollywood Hungama gave the film 2 out of 5 stars, writing "On the whole, THE GREAT INDIAN FAMILY rests on a promising storyline but fails to impress since the script and goings-on don’t pack a punch. At the box office, the film will struggle due to a lack of awareness". Dhaval Roy of The Times of India gave the film 2.5/5 stars writing, "The Great Indian Family has a genuine message but fall short in execution". Shubhra Gupta of The Indian Express gave the film 1.5/5 stars and critiqued, "If you want to be brave, the writing needs to match: here, even such wonderful actors like Kumud Mishra, Manoj Pahwa, Sadiya Siddiqui stand no chance. Neither does the always watchable Vicky Kaushal". Devesh Sharma of Filmfare gave 3/5 stars writing "The film must be watched for the important message it conveys. Religious harmony is the need of the hour and should always be preserved".

Monika Rawal of the Hindustan Times wrote "Overall, The Great Indian Family is nothing more than an average slice-of-life that can be a one-time-watch solely because of Vicky Kaushal's sincere act. Or maybe the fact that it tries to touch upon an important message, but too much is lost in translation". Saibal Chatterjee of NDTV gave 2.5 out of 5 stars, writing "The Great Indian Family could have been a film of far greater acuity, but the broadsides that it aims against narrow-mindedness through the story of a family as a microcosm of a society and a nation do find their mark". Sonali Dedhia of News18 gave 3 out of 5 stars, writing "The Great Indian Family as the name suggests is a sweet, inoffensive family drama on a slim premise, which has some strong performances, the unmistakable charm, and texture of small-town India, garnished with moments of joy and sadness". Simran Singh of Daily News and Analysis gave 3.5 out of 5 stars, calling the film a "feel-good entertainer" and praising the performances of Vicky Kaushal, Kumud Mishra, and Manoj Pawha".
