= Stop! (2004 film) =

Indian Hindi-language romantic drama film

- Directed by: Ajai Sinha
- Written by: Raghuveer Shekawat (dialogues)
- Screenplay by: Isshan Trivedi
- Story by: Sanjay Pathak
- Produced by: Laxman Bhatia
- Starring: Gauri Karnik; Ishitta Arun; Rocky Bhatia; Tejaswini Kolhapure; Kiran Jhanjhani; Harsh Chhaya; Ali Asgar; Dia Mirza
- Cinematography: Chirrantan Das
- Edited by: Sanjay Sankla
- Music by: Vishal–Shekhar
- Release date: 5 November 2004
- Country: India
- Language: Hindi

Stop! is a 2004 Indian Hindi-language romantic drama film directed by Ajai Sinha and starring Gauri Karnik, Ishitta Arun, Rocky Bhatia, Tejaswini Kolhapure, Kiran Jhanjhani, Harsh Chhaya, Ali Asgar and Dia Mirza.

== Cast ==
- Gauri Karnik as Pooja
- Ishitta Arun as Sonia
- Rocky Bhatia as Om
- Tejaswini Kolhapure as Tina
- Kiran Jhanjhani as Rohit
- Harsh Chhaya as Vivek Malhotra
- Ali Asgar as Rahul
- Himani Shivpuri as Mrs. A. Mehra
- Dia Mirza as Shama
- Om Puri as Anand Mehra (friendly appearance)
- Suzanne Bernert as Suzanne

== Soundtrack ==
The music was composed by Vishal–Shekhar with lyrics by Kumaar, Panchhi Jalonvi and Vishal Dadlani.

== Reception ==
Taran Adarsh of Bollywood Hungama rated the film 1/5 stars and wrote, "On the whole, STOP! has precious little to offer in terms of content". Patcy N of Rediff.com wrote, "If you want to see a big banner production with superstars, Stop! isn't for you. But if you're in the mood for light, enjoyable fare, it is a decent one-time watch".
