= My Birthday Song =

- Theatrical release poster
- Directed by: Samir Soni
- Written by: Samir Soni; Vrushali Telang
- Produced by: Sanjay Suri; Samir Soni
- Starring: Sanjay Suri; Nora Fatehi; Zenia Starr; Ayaz Khan; Suparna Krishna; Sameer Sharma; Elena Kazan
- Cinematography: Shubham Kasera
- Edited by: Sandeep Sethy
- Music by: Score: Pawan Rasaily; Songs: Rajeev V Bhalla; Ajay Govind; Nitin K. Menon; Joy Barua; Pawan Rasaily
- Production company: Kahwa Entertainment
- Distributed by: Kahwa Entertainment
- Release date: 19 January 2018
- Country: India
- Language: Hindi

My Birthday Song is a 2018 Bollywood psychological thriller film produced and directed by Samir Soni. The film stars the co-producer Sanjay Suri with Nora Fatehi, Zenia Starr and Ayaz Khan in supporting roles. The film revolves around a happily-married man and the song on his 40th birthday. It was released on 19 January 2018.

== Plot ==
Rajiv (Suri) is celebrating his 40th birthday with his friends when he meets a stranger named Sandy (Fatehi) and is intimate with her. She is killed accidentally by pieces of broken glass in the back of her head. Rajiv is stunned looking at the blood-soaked pillow and gulps a lot of alcohol with sleeping pills. The next morning, he wakes up to realise that everything that he was experiencing was just a dream but, as the day progresses, the events that take place in his life and the people that he comes across make him question whether what happened last night was a dream or did it actually happen. He calls his friend to check if his friend is fetching Sandy for the evening party. His friend is shocked as Rajiv was not told about it earlier. Rajiv discovers that Sandy is alive and staying at a hotel, where he calls her and asks to meet her. Sandy is the same girl he had met a few years before for his advertisement shoot and had spent the night with and forgotten.

Sandy tries to be intimate with Rajiv at the hotel room, but he tells her he saw her dying at the party. When she hugs him, he remembers the dream suddenly and pushes her back abruptly. She falls on a glass that breaks in her head and she lies on the floor with blood all over. Rajiv is now scared that his dream has come true. On the way back, he is stopped by the police for speeding and asked for his licence. He shows it to the policeman and sees his father's picture in his wallet. He recollects a childhood scene where his parents fought over the dinner table and the argument ended with their separation. On the way, his car suddenly breaks down on a remote road with the engine smoking. Out of the blue, a mechanic walks up to him with a tool kit and wishes him happy birthday as he ponders the situation. It can only be a fortunate day, a birthday, when someone's car breaks down and a mechanic comes up with a toolkit. Meanwhile, his car's tire is also punctured which he gets repaired. Before leaving, the mechanic murmurs him a statement and says "Apki Sandy ready hai, sir." Rajiv is stunned again and looks for the mechanic, but he has disappeared.

Rajiv starts his car and journey again. On his way, he remembers the good times spent with his wife on anniversary days and Sandy's head in blood again.

Rajiv goes to meet his wife who is at her maternal house. On the way, he catches his wife and Vicky, his friend hugging. He confronts her and his wife tells him that she met Vicky secretly because they were planning Bali trip for his birthday. Confused, Rajiv confesses that he murdered someone. His wife, Ritu accuses him of cheating and tells him she had called many times but he didn't pick up. Rajiv remembers leaving his phone in the hotel room and he runs back to the hotel. He enters the room but there is no one. He breaks down and asks the receptionist whether there is any booking of the name 'Sandy', to which the receptionist says there is no one with that name. While Rajiv leaves the hotel, the receptionist calls him and returns his phone. Rajiv runs away from the hotel and goes back to his house where there is a surprise birthday planned by his wife and friends, including Sandy. His wife tells him that she has forgiven him and Rajiv smiles, realising this is finally over. He washes his face and sits on the chair where he falls asleep. When he wakes up, he finds out his birthday party was over and everyone already left. He goes to the bedroom to find Sandy lying on the bed with bloodied head. He checks her ID and finds out that she was his step-sister. A flashback from Rajiv's childhood shows she was the sister who went to Canada with their mother when their parents' separated.

== Cast ==
- Sanjay Suri as Rajiv Kaul
- Nora Fatehi as Sandy
- Zenia Starr as Ritu
- Ayaz Khan as Vikram Acharya
- Sameer Sharma as Ravi Kaul
- Elena Kazan as Amy
- Suparna Krishna as Achala
- Aarti Khetarpal as Annie
- Aryan Veir Suri as Young Rajiv
- Kaushar Ali Khan as Vijay
- Aalam Bedi as Yash Kaul
- Rohan Awasthi as Maanav Kaul
- Poonam Kindo as Madhu
- Savitri Wahi as Nani Maa
- Mayana Sherawat as Baby Sandy
- Devishi Sharma as Young Sandy
- Purab Kohli as Ashish (cameo)
- Pitobash Tripathy as Waiter/Mechanic (cameo)

== Soundtrack ==
My Birthday Song

Soundtrack album by Various
- Released: 12 January 2018
- Genre: Feature film soundtrack
- Length: 22:03
- Label: Kahwa Entertainment

The film's songs were composed by Rajeev V Bhalla, Ajay Govind, Nitin Krishna Menon, Pawan Rasaily and Joi Barua with background music by Pawan Rasaily.

Tracklist
| No. | Title | Lyrics | Music | Singer(s) | Length |
|---|---|---|---|---|---|
| 1. | "My Birthday Song" | Akshay K Saxena | Raajeev V Bhalla | Raajeev V Bhalla | 04:11 |
| 2. | "Ajnabi" | Ajay Govind | Ajay Govind & Nitin Krishna Menon | Mohan Kannan | 05:54 |
| 3. | "Ghayal" | Ajay Govind | Ajay Govind & Nitin Krishna Menon | Mohan Kannan | 05:41 |
| 4. | "Bhaag" | Ajay Govind | Ajay Govind & Nitin Krishna Menon | Joi Barua | 04:06 |
| 5. | "Rain" | Joi Barua | Pawan Rasaily & Joi Barua | Joi Barua | 02:11 |
| Total length: | | | | | 22:03 |

== Critical response ==
The Times of India rated the film with 2.5/5 stars saying that it is for the audience which likes dark and mysterious cinema. Rajeev Masand of News 18 wrote that the film kept him guessing until the end and said, "It's not a perfect film, but there's enough to merit a single watch," and gave 2.5/5 stars. Sify mentioned that the film is looks good and that the first-time director Soni seems to grasp the secret of audiences' collective gasp. Rediff wrote that this psychological thriller is an honest effort and a huge relief for movie enthusiasts and gave 3.5/5 stars. Shubhra Gupta of The Indian Express gave the film a rating of 1.5 out of 5 and said, "The plotting and the treatment of My Birthday Song is far too inept to create a solid psychological thriller out of this looping-upon-itself story, whose big reveal is too brief, too late." Sweta Kaushal of The Hindustan Times gave the film a rating of 2 stars out of 5 and said that, "Debutante director Samir Soni starts off with an amazing idea which is failed by its execution. It is the heavy-footed treatment of the film that fails it. It is so over-dramatic that even the solid theme on which it is based gets lost."
