= Kahan Ho Tum (film) =

- Poster
- Directed by: Vijay Kumar
- Written by: Vijay Kumar; Hriday Lani; Chhaya Shenoy
- Produced by: Vijay Kumar
- Starring: Sharman Joshi; Samir Soni; Sonu Sood; Ishitta Arun
- Cinematography: Prasann Jain
- Edited by: Vijay Kumar
- Music by: Rajat Dholakia; Salim-Sulaiman
- Release date: 11 July 2003
- Country: India
- Language: Hindi

Kahan Ho Tum is a 2003 Indian Hindi-language thriller film written and directed by Vijay Kumar, starring Sharman Joshi, Samir Soni, Sonu Sood, Ishitta Arun, and Shwetha Menon.

== Cast ==
- Sharman Joshi as Rakesh
- Samir Soni as Jai
- Sonu Sood as Karan
- Ishitta Arun as Manasi
- Shwetha Menon as Santhali
- Raghubir Yadav as Banarsi
- Vikram Gokhale as Kapil Mehra
- Raj Zutshi as Police Inspector
- Shri Vallabh Vyas as Father Lobo
- A. K. Hangal as Ghanshyamji

== Soundtrack ==
The music was composed by Rajat Dholakia.

Track listing
No.	Title	Length
1.	"Saath Saath Rehte Hain"	5:21
2.	"Chhalka Hai Mausam Ka Jaadu"	3:28
3.	"Aayee Re Aayee Re Aayee Poonam Ki Raat"	8:15
4.	"Tan Man Pe Aaj Mere"	4:08
5.	"Sa Ni Dha Pa"	7:18
6.	"Koi Ummeed Ki"	0:50
7.	"Band Hai Har Gali"	0:51
8.	"Tum Kahan Ho"	0:43
9.	"Tum Ho Kis Haal Mein"	0:28
10.	"Saath Saath Rehte Hain"	1:05
Total length:		33:47

== Reception ==
Taran Adarsh of Bollywood Hungama wrote that "On the whole, Kahan Ho Tum lacks in merits to leave an impression". A critic from The Times of India wrote that "Vijay Kumar and his team have obviously set out to search for a missing link in the contemporary social framework. But the search finally proves futile. What we have is a film that can't seem to sit straight on its perch of idealism.. It topples over and falls off the edge under the weight of compromises".

On the contrary, a critic from Full Hyderabad wrote that "It is one of those films where you go to the theater not knowing what to expect and you come out pleasantly surprised" and added that "The story is not one of any great intrigue or originality. The treatment is. There is a bit of the Hitchcock in Vijay Kumar as he tells us the story. There is not any needless delving into family backgrounds or past lives".
