= Border Hindustan Ka =

- Border Hindustan Ka Movie Poster
- Directed by: Yogesh Bharadwaj
- Produced by: H.S. Taneja
- Starring: Faisal Khan; Rajat Bedi; Aditya Pancholi; Priya Gill; Mink Singh
- Edited by: Sanjay Verma
- Music by: Dilip-Hari Kishen
- Production company: Jayasree Productions
- Distributed by: Venus
- Release date: 20 June 2003 (India)
- Country: India
- Language: Hindi

Border Hindustan Ka (Border of India) is a 2003 Indian Bollywood Historical film directed by Yogesh Bharadwaj and produced by H.S. Taneja. It stars Faisal Khan, Rajat Bedi, Aditya Pancholi, Priya Gill and Mink Singh in pivotal roles.

== Cast ==
- Faisal Khan as Lt. Rajvir Singh
- Rajat Bedi as Hari Singh
- Aditya Pancholi as Ranbir Singh
- Priya Gill as Nargis
- Mink Brar as Manjeet
- Dina Pathak as Dadi, Nargis' grandmother.
- Dalip Tahil as Sarfaraz
- Ashish Vidyarthi as Major Ansari
- Dara Singh as Jarnail Singh
- Sudesh Berry as Jaffar / Jannisar (dual role)
- Akshaye Khanna as Mobarak(special appearance)
- Anil Nagarth as Mobarak's father (special appearance)

== Soundtrack ==
This album is composed by Dilip Hari Kishen.

#	Title	Singer(s)
1.	"Yaad Aati Hai"	Udit Narayan, Kumar Sanu, Vinod Rathod, Hariharan, Jagjit Singh and Sudesh Bhosle
2.	"Beti Dhan Begana -Bidai"	Mohammed Aziz
3.	"Bale Bale Ne Tor"	Udit Narayan, Jaspinder Narula
4.	"Hum Hind Ke Veer"	Sonu Nigam, KK, Udit Narayan, Hans Raj Hans
5.	"Gaye Sare Bachpan Ke Din"	Sukhwinder Singh, Kavita Krishnamurthy
6.	"Soni Peer Faquir"	Udit Narayan, Jaspinder Narula, Talat Aziz and Sabri Brothers

== Reception ==
Vinay Lal wrote that "Border Hindustan Ka [The Border of India] furnishes a very good example of everything that has gone wrong with the Hindi film. There isn’t a truly captivating moment in the film, not even an iota of an idea that one could describe as faintly interesting much less compelling or original".
