= Tehran (2025 film) =

2025 Indian film by Arun Gopalan

- Official release poster
- Directed by: Arun Gopalan
- Written by: Ritesh Shah; Ashish P. Verma; Bindni Karia
- Produced by: Dinesh Vijan; Shobhna Yadav; Sandeep Leyzell
- Starring: John Abraham; Neeru Bajwa; Manushi Chhillar
- Cinematography: Ievgen Gubrebko; Andre Menezes
- Edited by: Akshara Prabhakar
- Music by: Score: Ketan Sodha; Songs: Tanishk Bagchi; Dhruv Ghanekar
- Production companies: Maddock Films; Bake My Cake Films
- Distributed by: ZEE5; Netflix
- Release date: 14 August 2025
- Running time: 116 minutes
- Country: India
- Language: Hindi

Tehran is a 2025 Indian Hindi-language spy action thriller film directed by Arun Gopalan and produced by Dinesh Vijan, Shobhna Yadav and Sandeep Leyzell. It stars John Abraham, Neeru Bajwa and Manushi Chhillar. The film was based on the 2012 attacks on Israeli diplomats. The film premiered on ZEE5 on 14 August 2025, and on Netflix on 27 August 2025.

== Plot ==
ACP Rajeev Kumar, an officer in Delhi's Special Cell, investigates a bomb blast in 2012 that kills a young girl he personally knew. Deeply shaken, he takes the case forward with a personal motive.

The trail of evidence draws him into international espionage involving India, Iran, and Israel. As he pursues the truth, Rajeev finds himself deserted by his own country and targeted by Iranian intelligence forces.

Forced to act independently, he goes rogue, balancing professional duty with personal grief. His journey spans several countries, exposing betrayals and fragile alliances in the backdrop of a geopolitical power struggle.

== Cast ==
- John Abraham as ACP Rajeev Kumar, Vandana's husband
- Neeru Bajwa as Sheilaja
- Manushi Chhillar as SI Divya Rana
- Hadi Khanjanpour as Afshar Hosseini
- Madhurima Tuli as Vandana Kumar, Rajeev's wife
- Alyy Khan as Neeraj
- Elnaaz Norouzi as Layla
- Dinkar Sharma as SI Vijay
- Quashiq Mukherjee as Himadri
- Adam Karst as Tamir
- Ido Samuel as Yusuf
- Ashwin Kaushal as Dharmesh Jain
- Sushil Khatri as Police Commissioner
- Allon Sylvain as Syed Ali
- Farhad Kholgi as Mahmoud Alavi
- Aaradhya Tiwari as Flower Girl

== Production ==
The film was announced on 11 July 2022 by the makers through an announcement video featuring the first look of John Abraham from the film. On 19 July 2022 Manushi Chhillar was announced as the leading female actor of the film. Manushi joined the casting in July 2022.

Principal photography commenced in July 2022. Filming began on 11 July 2022 in Tehran, Iran. The second schedule began in August 2022 and the third schedule began in September. Filming wrapped up in October 2022. The film has been extensively shot in Glasgow, Mumbai and Delhi.

== Soundtrack ==
Tehran

Soundtrack album by Tanishk Bagchi and Dhruv Ghanekar
- Released: 29 August 2025
- Recorded: 2024–2025
- Genre: Feature film soundtrack
- Length: 17:01
- Language: Hindi
- Label: Zee Music Company
External audio
- Tehran - Full Album on YouTube

The film's soundtrack is composed by Tanishk Bagchi and Dhruv Ghanekar lyrics written by Irshad Kamil and Ishitta Arun while the background score is composed by Ketan Sodha.

The first single titled "Ishq Bukhaar" was released on 7 August 2025.

Track listing
No.	Title	Singer(s)	Length
1.	"Ishq Bukhaar"	Shreya Ghoshal, B Praak	3:07
2.	"Yaar Bichhda"	Afsana Khan	4:03
3.	"Tehran Theme Track"	Instrumental	2:47
4.	"Hasraton Ke Baazar" (Music by Dhruv Ghanekar and lyrics by Ishitta Arun)	Niranjan Menon	2:41
5.	"Yaar Bichhda" (Male Version)	Ashok Maskin	4:23
Total length:			17:01

== Release ==
The film was initially scheduled for a theatrical release on 26 January 2023, but was later postponed to April 2024. After several delays, it was eventually released on 14 August 2025 on ZEE5. Two weeks later, it premiered on Netflix as well.

== Reception ==
On the review aggregator website Rotten Tomatoes, 70% of 10 critics' reviews are positive, with an average rating of 5.8/10. Tushar Joshi from India Today rated the film 4 out of 5 stars, noting that it sensitively portrayed ordinary people caught in the crossfire of war. He highlighted that the screenplay emphasized the human cost of conflict while also praising the action sequences and cinematography. Ronak Kotecha from The Times Of India rated the film 3.5 stars out of 5 and wrote, "Overall, Tehran is a worthwhile watch for fans of geopolitical thrillers who are willing to pay attention and follow a layered narrative. It doesn't always clarify every thread, but its realism, strong performances and relentless pace make it an engaging spy drama." Lachmi Deb Roy from Firstpost rated the film 3 out of 5 stars, commending its portrayal of the geopolitical tension between Iran and Israel, as well as Abraham's performance, the script, and the cinematography. However, she also noted that the film's slow-burn nature may lead some viewers to perceive it as documentary-like. Shubhra Gupta from The Indian Express rated the film 2.5 stars out of 5 and wrote, "What John Abraham, whose impassivity helps his character feel as real as it can when done with reel-drama, manages to pull off here is noteworthy." Bollywood Hungama rated the film 2.5 stars out of 5, commending the action, production design, costumes, visual effects, and editing. However, the review noted that Chhillar was underutilized, and while Abraham excelled in action sequences, his emotional performance was described as average.
