= Mink Brar =

German model and actress

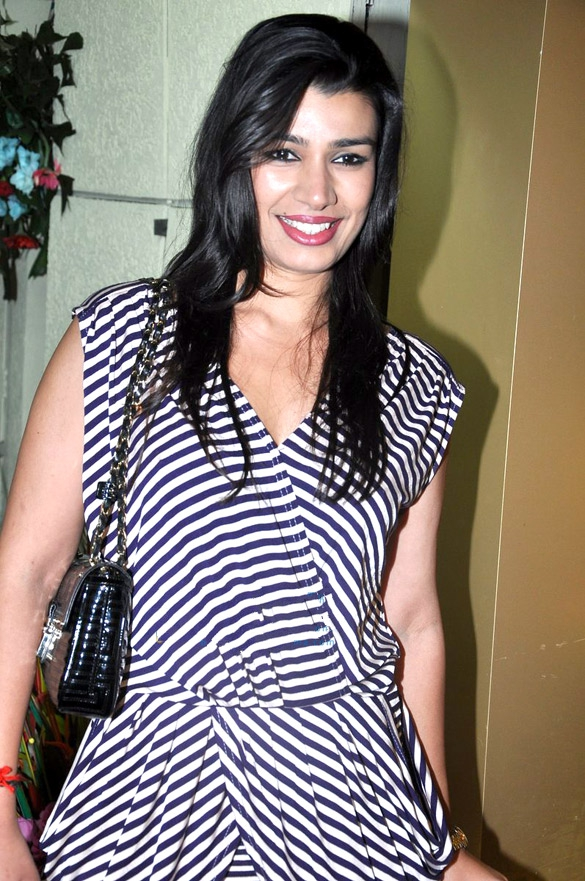
- Brar at the launch of Rohhit Verma's flagship store & Marigold Watches in February 2013
- Born: Mink Brar; 4 November 1980 (age 46); Frankfurt, West Germany
- Other name: Mink Singh
- Occupations: Actress, Model, Presenter, Producer
- Years active: 1993–2012
- Known for: Modelling, Indian films, Bigg Boss 6
- Relatives: Punnu Brar (brother)

Mink Brar (born 4 November 1980) is an Indian model, actress and producer. Mink is known for her work in Bollywood films and Indian television shows. She participated in the reality show Bigg Boss in 2012.

== Early life ==
Mink Brar was born as Mink Brar on 4 November 1980 in Frankfurt, Germany to Punjabi Sikh parents who migrated from India to Germany. About her name, Mink Brar says, "It's a very unique name. Mink is an animal that loves water and freedom, and is known for its precious fur." She was raised in Germany. Brar wanted to be a magistrate as a child. She got her education from Germany and completed a bachelor's degree.

=== Career ===
Veteran Hindi actor Dev Anand introduced Brar to the Indian film industry when she was 13. She made her debut in the Indian film industry with Dev Anand's Hindi film Pyaar Ka Tarana, which was released in September 1993. She then appeared in several films like Jung (1996), Saat Rang Ke Sapne (1998), Yamraaj (1998), Hum Aapke Dil Mein Rehte Hain (1999), Ganga Ki Kasam (1999), Maa Kasam (1999), Jwalamukhi (2000), Ajnabee (2001), Zahreela (2001), Pitaah (2002), Chalo Ishq Ladaaye (2002), Raaz(2002),Border Hindustan Ka (2003), and Oops (2003). She also worked in some South Indian films, including a Telugu movie, Prematho Raa (2001)

=== Bro and Sis Productions ===
In 2006, Brar turned into a producer and started a production house called Bro and Sis Productions with her brother Punnu Brar. She said in an interview, "Be it films, serials or even event management, we are ready. Bro and Sis Productions will be a complete entertainment house." Their first major work was the movie Katputtli, which was released in August 2006, in which Brar played the lead role. The film, however, failed to do any good business. The production company is presently producing an untitled project.

=== Music videos ===
In February 1999, Brar made a special dance appearance for the song Jumbalakka in the Tamil film En Swasa Kaatre. Brar appeared in the music video Lal Garara, from the movie and album Badal, which was released in February 2000. In August 2008, her production company released a music album, Ghonghat Mix, in which she acted in the music video, Mujhko Ranaji Maaf Karna. This music album was Bro and Sis Productions second major work after the movie Katputtli. Brar said in an interview, "We were so exhausted after making Katputtli that we wanted to make something more enjoyable and easy to do."

=== Reality television ===
She participated in a dance reality TV show Dancing Queen for the TV channel Colors. The show went on air in December 2008. In March 2009, she appeared in Sarkaar Ki Duniya, an adventure reality show on Real, from where she was eliminated in the 17th week in June 2009.

In February 2011, she appeared in sports entertainment reality game TV show, Zor Ka Jhatka - Total Wipeout, on Imagine TV which was hosted by Shahrukh Khan. The show was based on the American reality show Wipeout. She told IANS, "I lost six kilos while I was shooting for Zor Ka Jhatka. I got hurt, but I tried my level best to be in the competition". She next participated in a celebrity reality TV show Bigg Boss Season 6, entering the show in October 2012 as a wild card contestant. She said in an interview with PTI, "I am not here for getting a new platform because Bigg Boss is a show which can make somebody popular or destroy their image. I would not like to come out as an aggressive or a crazy person." She was voted out from the Bigg Boss house in December 2012. Talking about her experience in the show, after her exit, she said in an interview with The Times of India, "It was a life time experience, it's a mixture of all good and bad and everything that even don't exits I would say."

== Controversies ==
- In July 2011, a few media reports suggested that Brar had acted in a porn film titled Desert Queen. The posters of the film, featuring Brar, were put up at various locations in Los Angeles. Brar denied having acted in any such project. She said in an interview with The Times of India, "I was shocked. I cried a lot. Though the poster has my photo, I am not in the film. I just want to ask all those who have done this, do they have a proof that it's me?"
- In August 2011, a video surfaced where Mink was seen kissing a South African woman in a swimming pool. The video went viral in India. Reacting to the video, Brar admitted that she is a lesbian, however, she later withdrew her statement saying she was hungover when she said that and remarked, "I am not a lesbian. I was so drunk in the party that I could have smooched anybody in front of me. It was like a moment that just came and I acted on it."
- Media reports indicated in January 2013, while distributing blankets to homeless people with her brother in Versova, Mumbai, Brar spotted a veteran photographer Jagdish Mali, who is also the father of Indian actress, Antara Mali, in a semi-nude dishevelled & disoriented state. Brar said, "I looked out of the window and immediately recognized him. I stopped the car and walked up to him with my brother who got him a pair of shorts & a T-shirt." About his condition, Brar elaborated, "He was covered with faeces and looked as though he had not eaten in a while. He seemed very disturbed and completely disconnected." It was reported that Brar made sure he reached home safely and contacted Salman Khan for assistance. However, Jagdish's family and friends said that his condition was absolutely fine, though he was diabetic, and Brar was manipulating this issue to the press to get publicity, and that they could take legal action against Brar for spreading wrong information.

== Personal life ==
Brar was raised in a conservative and protective environment, with her family trying to inculcate in her traditional Indian values instead of western ones. Her immediate family consists of her mother and brother named Punnu Brar, who is three years younger to her.

== Filmography ==
=== Film ===
Year	Title	Role	Notes
1993	Pyar Ka Tarana	Chanda	
1996	Jung	Lily	
1997	Chandralekha	Special appearance	Malayalam film Appeared in the song "Manathe Chandiranothoru"
1998	Saat Rang Ke Sapne	Bhanwari	
1998	Yamraaj	Asha	
1998	Doli Saja Ke Rakhna	Special appearance	Appeared in a song
1999	Raja Kumarudu	Special Appearance	Telugu film Appeared in the song "Bollywood Balaraju Ni"
1999	Hum Aapke Dil Mein Rehte Hain	Anita	
1999	Maa Kasam	Anu	
1999	Ganga Ki Kasam	Rani	
1999	En Swasa Kaatre	Special appearance	Tamil film Appeared in the song "Jumbalakka"
1999	Poovellam Kettuppar	Special appearance	Tamil film Appeared in the song "Seniorita"
2000	Jwalamukhi	Roma	
2000	Badal	Special appearance	Appeared in the song "Lal Garara"
2001	Piriyadha Varam Vendum	Special appearance	Tamil film Appeared in the song "Vasco Da Gama"
2001	Prematho Raa	Bharati	Telugu film
2001	Ajnabee	Real Sonia Bajaj	
2001	Zahreela	Special appearance	Appeared in the song "Jara Chakh Le"
2001	Aamdani Atthani Kharcha Rupaiyaa	Sukeshini	
2002	Holi	Special appearance in the song "Chamak Cham"	Telugu film
2002	Raaz	Nisha Malini	
2002	Pitaah	Naina	
2002	Chalo Ishq Ladaaye	Bobby	
2003	Border Hindustan Ka	Manjeet	
2003	Oops	Sonia	
2003	Apudapudu	Special appearance in the song "wahawahwa hawa"	Telugu film
2006	Katputtli	Lisa	First film as producer

=== Television ===
Year	Name	Role	Notes	Ref
2009	Dancing Queen	Contestant		
2011	Zor Ka Jhatka: Total Wipeout	Contestant		
2012	Bigg Boss 6	Contestant	Wild Card	

== See also ==
- List of Indian film actresses
