= Snehapoorvam Anna =

- DVD cover
- Directed by: Sangeeth Sivan
- Written by: Harikumar
- Produced by: Joy Augustine; Rajan Chodankar; Sangeeth Sivan
- Starring: Vaibhavi Merchant; Nedumudi Venu; Poornima Jayaram; Innocent (Actor); Captain Raju
- Cinematography: Ramji
- Edited by: G. Murali
- Music by: Raju Singh
- Release date: 11 February 2000
- Country: India
- Language: Malayalam

Snehapoorvam Anna is a 2000 Malayalam romantic film starring Vaibhavi Merchant and Innocent. It was written by Hari Kumar and directed by Sangeeth Sivan. The film concerns the relationship between a father and his daughter.

== Plot ==
Anna is her father's only daughter. He has the dream of marrying her to someone according to his wish. However, she falls in love with a boy and this shakes the relationship between the daughter and father.

== Cast ==
- Vaibhavi Merchant as Anna
- Subil Surendran as Jomon
- Innocent as Anna's Father
- Cochin Haneefa as Abu Uncle
- Bindu Panicker as Fousi Aunty
- Captain Raju as Jomon's Father
- Reena as Jomon's Mother
- Nandu as College Student
- Sudheesh as College Student
- Sandra Jose as College Student

== Soundtrack ==
The film score and soundtrack of the film were composed by Raju Singh, with lyrics by Shibu Chakravarthy. The film had eight songs, of which six were picturised.

1. "Aaru nee en hridayakavaadam" - M. G. Sreekumar
2. "Akkare Veettil Anthonichanu" - M. G. Sreekumar, Biju Narayanan, Sujatha
3. "Karukappulmettile" - M. G. Sreekumar, Sujatha
4. "Maaleyam Maarilezhum" - Sreenivas, K. S. Chithra
5. "Maanthalirin" - M. G. Sreekumar, K. S. Chithra
6. " Maanthalirin [M]" - K. J. Yesudas, Raju Singh
7. "Ooadaan (Rap)" - Biju Narayanan, Chorus
8. "Ormayil Ennormayil [F]" - Sujatha Mohan
