= Club Factory =

Chinese online store

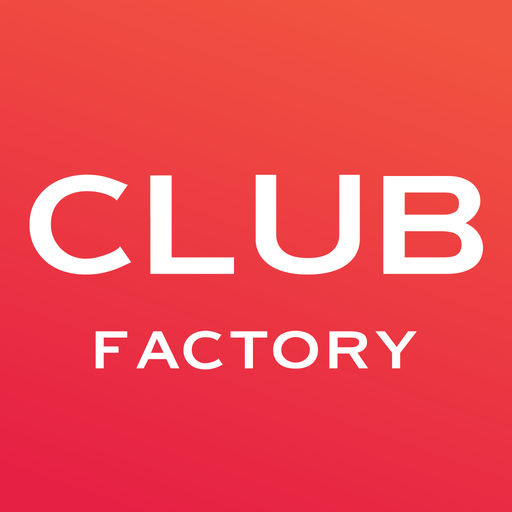
- Club Factory Logo
- Website type: E-commerce
- Available in: English
- Founded: 7 June 2014; 12 years ago
- Headquarters: Hangzhou, China
- Owner: Jiayun Data Technology Co. Ltd
- Founders: Aaron Jialun Li; Vincent Lou
- Services: Online shopping
- Website: Club Factory
- Commercial: Yes
- Registration: Required
- Current status: Online

Club Factory is a fashion, beauty and lifestyle e-commerce store headquartered in Hangzhou, Zhejiang, China. It was created by Jiayun Data Technology, a Chinese company, in the year 2014.

== History ==
Club Factory was first launched in 2014 by Aaron Jialun Li and Vincent Lou, both who are graduates of the Stanford University, California. According to the makers, the Club Factory software uses proprietary AI-algorithm and knowledge graph to compare prices from multiple manufacturers.

ClubFactory has positioned its market in places like India, Europe, United States, Southeast Asia and the Middle East. India became the leading market for ClubFactory E-Commerce India Pvt Ltd accounting for nearly 40 million users out of its 70 million users globally. In India, ClubFactory E-Commerce India Pvt Ltd owes its growth in the market to its consumers. The Times of India described the Indian consumers as "discount hunters"

In 2018, the electronic commerce platform raised $100 million in a series C or venture round of funding from existing investors like IDG Capital, Kunlun Capital and Bertelsmann Asia Investment (BAI).

In June 2020, the Government of India banned Club Factory along with 58 other Chinese apps citing data and privacy issues. The border tensions in 2020 between India and China might have also played a role in the ban.
