= Maa Kasam (1999 film) =

- Promotional Poster
- Directed by: Ashok Gaikwad
- Written by: Iqbal Durrani
- Produced by: Rajiv Babbar
- Starring: Mithun Chakraborty; Mink Singh; Gulshan Grover
- Cinematography: K V Ramanna
- Edited by: D. N. Malik
- Music by: Anand–Milind
- Production company: Aabha Films
- Release date: 5 November 1999
- Running time: 132 minutes
- Language: Hindi

Maa Kasam(transl. Swear To Mother) is a 1999 Indian Hindi-language action film directed by Ashok Gaikwad and produced by Rajiv Babbar, starring Mithun Chakraborty, Mink Singh and Gulshan Grover. The film was average at the box office.

== Plot ==
The movie is about an honest police officer inspector Ajay Shastry who avenges the bad guys for raping his young sister.

== Cast ==
- Mithun Chakraborty as Inspector Ajay Shastry
- Mink Singh as Anu
- Gulshan Grover as Acharya
- Nishigandha Wad as Acharya,s wife
- Hemant Birje as Thakur Anand Singh
- Asrani as Villager Khairatilal
- Harish Patel as Police Inspector Bhavar
- Arjun (Firoz Khan) as Inspector Gashal
- Vikas Anand as Police Commissioner Mohan Saxena
- Veeru Krishnan as Acharya's servant
- Shiva Rindani as Thakur Khadak Singh
- Gavin Packard as Changeza
- Pinky Chinoy as Janki(Ajay's sister)
- Shalini Kapoor
- Kasam Ally as Thakur Shamsher Singh
- Col. Trilok Kapoor as Thakur

== Music ==
1. "Dekha Jo Padosan Ma" - Sapna Awasthi
2. "Nikal Padi Nikal" - Vinod Rathod, Sonali Vajpayee
3. "Angoorwali Bagiyan" - Sapna Awasthi, Poornima
4. "Lachke Teri Kamariya" - Jaspinder Narula, Sonu Nigam
