= Vaibhavi Merchant =

Indian choreographer (born 1975)

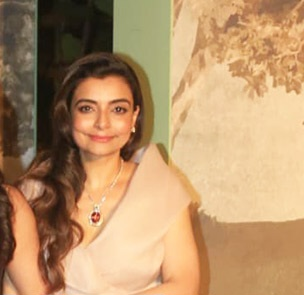
- Vaibhavi Merchant in 2025
- Born: 17 December 1975 (age 50); Mumbai, Maharashtra, India
- Occupations: Choreographer, actor
- Years active: 1999 – present
- Relatives: Shruti Merchant (sister); Chinni Prakash (uncle)
- Website: www.vaibhavimerchant.com

Vaibhavi Merchant is an Indian dance choreographer working in Bollywood films. She won the National Film Award for Best Choreography twice for the song "Dholi Taaro Dhol Baaje" from Hum Dil De Chuke Sanam in 1999 and for the song "Dhindhora Baje Re" from Rocky Aur Rani Kii Prem Kahaani in 2023.

== Career ==
Merchant was born in Chennai, Tamil Nadu, to Ramesh Merchant and Hridaya Merchant. She is the granddaughter of choreographer B. Hiralal and the elder sister of Shruti Merchant.

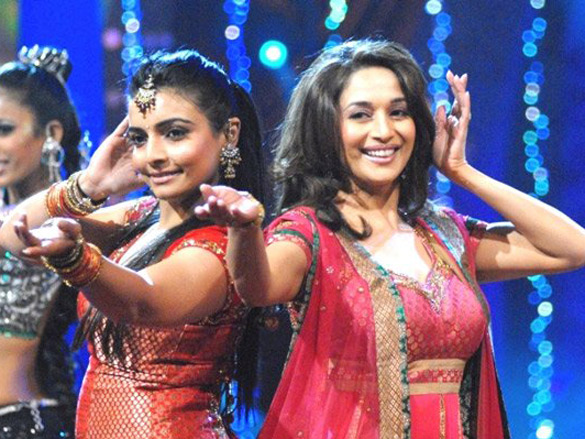
Merchant with Madhuri Dixit whom she choreographed in Aaja Nachle.

She began her career by assisting her uncle Chinni Prakash. In 1999, she did her first solo work for the choreography of the song Dhol Baaje for the film Hum Dil De Chuke Sanam. She won the National Film Award for Best Choreography for her work.

She had her acting debut in a Malayalam film Snehapoorvam Anna in 2000.

She took a short break from the industry and then returned with the song O Ri Chhori in the 2001 film Lagaan. She then choreographed Kajra Re from Bunty Aur Babli (2005), which fetched her several awards. She continued to choreograph selected numbers in films such as Devdas, Baghban, Fida, Dhoom (as well as its two sequels), Veer-Zaara, Aaja Nachle, Rab Ne Bana Di Jodi and Aiyyaa. She also choreographed the Australian musical The Merchants of Bollywood, a musical written by Toby Gough about her family.

She has been a judge on various television dance reality shows like Nach Baliye 3, Jhalak Dikhhla Jaa (season 3), Zara Nachke Dikha 2, and Just Dance.

== Filmography ==
=== As choreographer ===
- 1999: Hum Dil De Chuke Sanam (Dhol Baaje)
- 2001: Albela
- 2001: Lagaan
- 2002: Filhaal
- 2002: Na Tum Jaano Na Hum
- 2002: Devdas
- 2002: Deewangee
- 2002: Karz: The Burden of Truth
- 2002: Guru Mahaguru
- 2003: Dil Ka Rishta
- 2003: Dum
- 2003: Kash Aap Hamare Hote
- 2003: Haasil
- 2003: Mumbai Se Aaya Mera Dost
- 2004: Aetbaar
- 2004: Rudraksh
- 2004: Meenaxi: A Tale of Three Cities
- 2004: Shaadi Ka Laddoo
- 2004: Garv
- 2004: Kyun! Ho Gaya Na...
- 2004: Fida
- 2004: Dhoom
- 2004: Rakht
- 2004: Dil Ne Jise Apna Kahaa
- 2004: Madhoshi
- 2004: Tumsa Nahin Dekha
- 2004: Veer Zaara
- 2004: Swades
- 2004: Dil Maange More
- 2005: Chehraa
- 2005: Bunty Aur Babli
- 2005: No Entry
- 2005: Ramji Londonwaley
- 2005: Athadu (Telugu)
- 2005: Shaadi No. 1
- 2005: Neal 'n' Nikki
- 2005: Shikhar
- 2006: Rang De Basanti
- 2006: Humko Tumse Pyaar Hai
- 2006: Fanaa
- 2006: Krrish
- 2006: Umrao Jaan
- 2006: Baabul
- 2006: Chamki Chameli
- 2006: Dhoom 2
- 2007: Marigold
- 2007: Heyy Babyy
- 2007: Aaja Nachle
- 2007: Jhoom Barabar Jhoom
- 2007: Ta Ra Rum Pum
- 2008: Love Story 2050
- 2008: Rab Ne Bana Di Jodi
- 2008: Thoda Pyaar Thoda Magic
- 2008: Bhoothnath
- 2008: Dostana
- 2008: Tashan
- 2009: Dil Bole Hadippa
- 2009: Luck By Chance
- 2009: Delhi-6
- 2009: Kurbaan
- 2009: Kambakkht Ishq
- 2010: No Problem
- 2010: Band Baaja Baaraat
- 2011: Don 2
- 2011: Game
- 2011: Zindagi Na Milegi Dobara
- 2011: Ladies vs Ricky Bahl
- 2011: Bodyguard
- 2012: Aiyyaa
- 2012: Ek Tha Tiger
- 2012: Jab Tak Hai Jaan
- 2013: Bombay Talkies
- 2013: Bhaag Milkha Bhaag
- 2013: Dhoom 3
- 2016: Fan
- 2016: Sultan
- 2016: Befikre
- 2017: Jab Harry Met Sejal
- 2017: OK Jaanu
- 2017: Tiger Zinda Hai
- 2018: Hichki
- 2018: Loveratri
- 2018: Naa Peru Surya (Telugu Film)
- 2018: Bharat
- 2019: Saaho
- 2019: Dabangg 3
- 2022: Radhe Shyam
- 2023: Pathaan (Besharam Rang)
- 2023: Rocky Aur Rani Kii Prem Kahaani (Tum Kya Mile, Kudmayi & Dhindhora Baje Re)
- 2023: Jawan (Not Ramaiya Vastavaiya)
- 2023: Tiger 3 (Leke Prabhu Ka Naam & Ruaan)
- 2026: King

=== Acting Credits ===
- 2000: Snehapoorvam Anna (Malayalam Film)
- 2012: Student of the Year (special appearance in the song Disco Deewane)

== Awards ==
- 2000: National Film Award for Best Choreography – Dholi Taaro Dhol Baaje from (Hum Dil De Chuke Sanam)
- 2006: IIFA Award for Best Choreography – Kajra Re from (Bunty Aur Babli)
- 2006: Zee Cine Award for Best Choreography – Kajra Re from (Bunty Aur Babli)
- 2006: Bollywood Movie Award for Best Choreography – Kajra Re from (Bunty Aur Babli)
- 2006: Producers Guild Film Award for Best Choreography – Kajra Re from (Bunty Aur Babli)
- 2008: IIFA Award for Best Choreography – Aaja Nachle from (Aaja Nachle)
- 2023: National Film Award for Best Choreography – Dhindhora Baje Re (Rocky Aur Rani Kii Prem Kahaani)
