= Harvey Goldsmith =

English performing arts promoter (born 1946)

Harvey Goldsmith CBE
- Born: 4 March 1946 (age 80); Edgware, Middlesex, England
- Occupation: Promoter of performing arts
- Years active: 1966–present
- Employer(s): Harvey Goldsmith; Entertainments Ltd; Harvey Goldsmith; Productions Ltd; Artiste Management; Productions Ltd
- Known for: Performing arts promotions, Live Aid, Live 8
- Title: Harvey Goldsmith CBE
- Website: Harveygoldsmith.com

Harvey Goldsmith CBE (born 4 March 1946) is an English performing arts promoter. He is best known as a promoter of rock concerts, charity concerts, television broadcasts for the Prince's Trust and the Teenage Cancer Trust shows at the Royal Albert Hall.

In 1985, Goldsmith promoted the Live Aid concert held at Wembley Stadium in London. During early 2007, he appeared on the Channel 4 programme Get Your Act Together with Harvey Goldsmith. In October the same year, he promoted a reunion concert for surviving members of Led Zeppelin in memory of Atlantic Records founder Ahmet Ertegun, which was held at London's O_{2} Arena.

Goldsmith managed artists such as Streetwalkers and Jeff Beck. He has also promoted major concerts by some of the world's major music artists including: Yes, Genesis, Led Zeppelin, Pink Floyd, David Bowie, Queen, the Eagles, Elton John, U2, Madonna, Andrea Bocelli, Muse, Bob Dylan, the Rolling Stones, the Who, Bruce Springsteen, Lynyrd Skynyrd, Santana, Luciano Pavarotti, Sheryl Crow, Shania Twain, Bee Gees, Jools Holland, Oasis, Paul Weller, Rod Stewart, Diana Ross, Saxon, Shirley Bassey, Coldplay, Nigel Kennedy, Eric Clapton, Richard Ashcroft, Ash, Madness, Aswad, David Gray, Scissor Sisters, Van Morrison, Sting, Billy Connolly .

== Career ==
Born on 4 March 1946 to a Jewish family in Edgware, Middlesex, Goldsmith started out as a pharmacy student in Brighton, East Sussex where he founded Club 66, a successful weekly student live music venue and organized larger events at the Brighton Metropole. Goldsmith's first big break in the world of music promotion came with founding the popular 'Garden Party' festivals at Crystal Palace Bowl, which started in 1971 and ran annually until 1980. A decade later the scale of many popular concerts had increased and moved to larger stadiums and had established Wembley Stadium as a major venue for the top artists of the world. In 1975, he was the promoter behind the Loftus Road Concert at Queens Park Rangers' Stadium for Yes when they toured to promote their Relayer album.

During 1979 Goldsmith promoted the Concerts for Kampuchea, at Hammersmith Odeon, London, featuring artists including Paul McCartney, Queen and the Who. The event raised over $2 million from worldwide sales.

In 1985, Goldsmith organised Live Aid with Bob Geldof and Midge Ure. This raised £140 million within ten weeks. Live Aid was the first ever "Global Juke Box", featuring two near-simultaneous concerts, one at Wembley Stadium in the UK and JFK Stadium in the U.S. Over 60 countries showed the 17-hour event live on television.

Following the success of Live Aid, Goldsmith became involved with concerts in aid of human rights including a worldwide Amnesty Tour. He joined The Prince's Trust in 1982 and produced the first Prince's Trust Rock Gala. Goldsmith then became a member of The Prince's Trust Board and Vice Chairman of Prince's Trust Trading Ltd.

In 1986, he promoted Luciano Pavarotti at Wembley Arena. Because of Goldsmith's expertise in staging charity events his company Harvey Goldsmith Artiste Management productions was brought in as executive producers of the 1990 live performance of Pink Floyd's The Wall broadcast from Berlin. Due to the success of these concerts, Pavarotti agreed to perform at a free concert in Hyde Park organised by Goldsmith in 1991. This concert was part of Pavarotti's 30th anniversary celebrations and attracted 125,000 people.

In 1992 Goldsmith organised The Freddie Mercury Tribute Concert to increase AIDS awareness and this was a live TV success. In the same year he became chairman of the first National Music Day (UK), which was instigated to promote the importance of music in UK. Goldsmith arranged a programme of 1,500 musical events nationwide, in many musical styles. Goldsmith persuaded Pavarotti to return and perform again in UK at Leeds Castle in Kent during 1993.

In 1994 and on behalf of The Prince of Wales and President Havel of the Czech Republic, Goldsmith was appointed Executive Producer of The Prague Heritage Fund Gala Classical Concert. This concert featured Georg Solti, Dame Kiri Te Kanawa, Murray Perahia and Gabriela Beňačková and was broadcast worldwide.The same year, he co-promoted the SummerSlam wrestling show at Wembley Stadium with the World Wrestling Federation. During the same year Goldsmith began working with Cirque du Soleil. This became one of the most successful shows to perform in the UK, returning to London's Royal Albert Hall on a regular basis. The show was seen by 183,000 people its popularitty was reflected by a high ticket sale. In 2005 Goldsmith managed the show simultaneously in London, Birmingham and Manchester. This marked the first time in Europe that there were three different productions in the same country.

In the Queen's Birthday Honours 1996 Goldsmith was appointed a Commander of the Order of the British Empire (CBE) for services to entertainment. Between 1996 and 1998 Goldsmith oversaw spectacular productions of the Lord of the Dance musical, which featured Michael Flatley in the leading role. he also promoted Pavarotti for a fourth time, in Manchester during 1997.

In October 2002 Goldsmith promoted Bruce Springsteen at Wembley Arena and tickets for this show sold out in forty minutes, making it one of his most successful promotions. This was followed by three sellout stadium shows in May 2003. In November 2006 Goldsmith produced the UK Arena dates of Springsteen's sell-out tour with the Seeger Sessions band.

In January 2006 Goldsmith was awarded the Chevalier des Arts et des Lettres from the French Minister of Culture. He presented the dance spectacular The Merchants of Bollywood. This was the first Bollywood production to tour straight from Film City in Mumbai. Goldsmith was honoured with the 15th Music Industry Trust's Award in October 2006, one of the highest accolades to be awarded in the music industry. this was in recognition of his contribution to the music industry. In the same year Midem (Marché International du Disque et de l'Edition Musicale) the world's largest music industry trade fair honoured The Live Aid founders and Live 8 producers Goldsmith, Bob Geldof and John Kennedy OBE with the Midem Personality of the Year Award. This award was awarded in recognition of their outstanding work in bringing the music industry together to raidse money and to raise money to help alleviate poverty and famine in Africa. It was the first time in the 17-year history of Midem that this accolade was awarded to more than one person. In 2007 he promoted a six-month European tour of The Merchants of Bollywood.

In May and June 2008 Goldsmith brought Bruce Springsteen and the E Street Band back to the UK. They played at Manchester Old Trafford Stadium, London Emirates Stadium and Cardiff Millennium Stadium. This was the first concert ever held at the Emirates Football Stadium. In October 2008 Goldsmith produced Salute Petra, the official tribute concert to the life of Luciano Pavarotti, held in Petra, Jordan under the patronage of Princess Haya Bint Al Hussein. The tribute featured artists from the world of opera such as Angela Gheorghiu, Andrea Bocelli, José Carreras, and Plácido Domingo, and pop artists such as Sting, Zucchero, and Laura Pausini. The concert was filmed and released on DVD which were sold to raise money for the United Nations Fund for Refugees. In November 2008 Goldsmith was honoured with the Armand de Brignac V.I.P Award from Classic Rock Magazine and he was also given the award for Event of the Year (Led Zeppelin concert at the O2 Arena in honour of Ahmet Ertegun). In December 2008 Goldsmith took over the management of Jeff Beck after meeting him at the Classic Rock Awards. The National Outdoor Events Association presented Goldsmith with the Lifetime Achievement Award from the Outdoor Events Industry in February 2009.

Goldsmith is chairman of the foundation of The British Music Experience which opened at the O2 Arena in March 2009. The BME is a registered charity and is the UK's museum of music history, with the purpose to advance the education and appreciation of the art, history and science of music in Britain. It helped over 14,000 students in the last year and administered over £140,000 in education grants for the local community. In September 2009 Goldsmith produced the Tower Festival in the Tower of London which ran for ten days. He then promoted The Last Night of the Poms starring Dame Edna and Sir Les Patterson, which went on tour around the U.K reviving the show from twenty eight years before. In a busy year Goldsmith produced Andrea Bocelli's UK tour in conjunction with Kilimanjaro and the first concert tour by Yusuf (formerly known as Cat Stevens) in thirty years. Yusuf's tour ended with a show at the Royal Albert Hall, which featured a preview section of Yusuf's new musical Moonshadow.

2010 saw the release of Jeff Beck's first studio album in over six years. In support of this album, entitled Emotion & Commotion Beck embarked on a tour of Australia, New Zealand, Japan, Korea, the U.S and Europe. Goldsmith also reassembled legendary rock band Faces to perform a handful of UK dates. In April 2010 Goldsmith was honoured as the International Music Person of the Year for his outstanding contributions to the Music Industry at the Musexpo by the City of West Hollywood.

Goldsmith promoted a concert at the beginning of 2011 for the charity Killing Cancer with a lineup of artists including Richard Ashcroft, Bryan Adams, Jeff Beck, Debbie Harry and the Who. In February 2011 Goldsmith produced City Rocks, which was in support of the Lord Mayor's Appeal, attended by the Lord Mayor of London, Alderman Michael Bear and the Lady Mayoress, Barbara Bear. City Rocks was the first major rock concert held in the city of London. In recognition of his outstanding contribution to the institution's music education, Goldsmith was awarded an honorary fellowship from Ravensbourne. In September 2011. Goldsmith chaired the judges panel for the Editorial Intelligence Awards in October 2011 and became a board member. The Lord Mayor of London honoured Goldsmith with the Freedom of the City in November 2011. In December 2011, Goldsmith was named 100 Club's most influential person in the events business. In the same year he also became the chairman of Ignite.

As part of the Queen's Diamond Jubilee celebrations in May 2012, Goldsmith received The Diamond Award for his contribution to The Arts.. During July 2012, the University of Brighton presented Goldsmith with an honorary degree of Doctor of Arts.

In August 2014, Goldsmith was one of two hundred public figures who were signatories to a letter to The Guardian opposing Scottish independence in the run-up to September's referendum on that issue.

== Promotion companies ==
- In 1973 he formed Artiste Management Productions Limited, to produce and manage artists in the music industry.
- In 1976 Harvey Goldsmith Entertainments Limited was formed, which became the UK's leading promoter of concerts and events.
- In 2002 Harvey Goldsmith Productions was formed to carry on the legacy of leading concert and events promotions.
