= Sanober Kabir =

Indian actress and singer

- Occupations: Actress; singer
- Spouse: Rajeev Singh (m. 2010)
- Relatives: Murad–Rai-Aman family

Sanober Kabir is an Indian former actress and singer. A member of the Murad–Rai-Aman family of Bollywood, she is best known for her dancer numbers.

== Career ==
Sanober Kabir made her debut in Sawan Kumar Tak's Mother 98, starring Rekha. After acting in few Bollywood films, Kabir shifted her focus on television and appeared in the soap operas Tum Bin Jaoon Kahaan, Arzoo Hai Tu and Karishma. She then turned to singing and launched her remix album "Bombshell Babe". The tune from the album "Meri Beri Ke Ber Mat Todo" was a huge hit.

== Music videos ==
Year	Album	Song	Singer
2003	The Return Of Kaanta Mix	Meri Beri Ke Ber	Sanober
2005	Bombshell Babes	Kaan Mein Jhumka	Sanober
2005	DJ Hot Remix Volume 4	Kaan Mein Jhumka	Sonu Nigam & Kalpana
2006	Sanober & The Masti Express	Soniye Dil Nahi Lagda Tere Bina	Sanober

== Personal life ==
Kabir was born to Sabiha and NS Kabir. Her mother Sabiha is a former Bollywood fashion designer, and brother Faruk Kabir is a film director. Actor Murad was her maternal grandfather while actor Raza Murad is Sanober's maternal uncle and actress Sonam is her cousin.

Sanober married model-actor Rajeev Singh, the winner of 2001's Manhunt International, in 2010. She gave birth to their son, Fateh Singh, in May 2014.
