= Katputtli =

- Official Movie Poster
- Directed by: Sanjay Khanna
- Written by: Punnu Brar
- Produced by: Mink Brar; Punnu Brar
- Starring: Mink Brar; Milind Soman; Yukta Mookhey; Sameer Dharmadhikari; Seema Biswas
- Cinematography: Najeeb Khan
- Edited by: M Rafique
- Music by: Bapi-Tutul; Ishq Bector; Punnu Brar; Daboo Malik
- Distributed by: Sahara One Motion Pictures
- Release date: 18 August 2006
- Country: India
- Language: Hindi

Katputtli is a 2006 Bollywood thriller film directed by Sanjay Khanna. The film stars Mink Brar, Milind Soman, Yukta Mookhey, Sameer Dharmadhikari and Seema Biswas.

== Plot ==
Lisa (Mink Brar) can't remember who she is. She is aware of only two things - her dress is full of blood and she's got a coat full of cash. Her husband Arjun (Milind Soman) is a famous surgeon who does his best to help her remember. So begins a love story in which Arjun tries to make his wife fall in love with him all over again. All going well until Lisa gets a strange feeling about what went wrong that night. She starts getting flashes of blood and money. Arjun can't seem to help her and neither can their friendly neighbor Anju(Yukta Mookhey), who is always around to help Lisa get better. The mystery unfolds when Anju's husband Dev (Sameer Dharmadhikari), a naval officer and Lisa's college friend, returns. Dev doesn't want to wait till her memory returns and he won't rest until he can figure out how Lisa's life became so twisted. Lisa must decide if she wants to discover the truth or be content with the life Arjun has created for her.

== Cast ==
- Mink Brar as Lisa
- Milind Soman as Arjun
- Yukta Mookhey as Anju
- Sameer Dharmadhikari as Dev
- Sajid Khan as Dr Sharma
- Ruby Bhatia as Anita
- Ashmit Patel As Chris
- Mukul Dev as Sidhu

== Soundtrack ==
The soundtrack features six songs. Music for the film is composed by Bappi-Tutul, Punnu Brar, Daboo Malik and Ishq Bector. With original lyrics by Praveen Bhardwaj, Sandeep Nath, Punnu Brar, Karamjeet Kadhowala and Ishq Bector.

Track List

1. Mitra Nu -
2. Neele Asmaan Par -
3. Mann Mera -
4. Rafta Rafta -
5. Snake Potion -
6. Wild Dreams -
