= The Merchants of Bollywood =

Musical by Toby Gough

The Merchants of Bollywood is an Australian musical written and directed by Toby Gough. The show is about the history of the Bollywood film industry, and it is named after Hiralalji Merchant and his grand daughter Vaibhavi Merchant, two notable Indian choreographers. The set and lighting design was by Liz Berry and the costumes were designed by Falguni Thakore and Bipin. The musical has been described as "an Indian version of the Billy Elliot story" and is choreographed by Vaibhavi Merchant. It was the first ever Bollywood production to tour straight from Film City in Mumbai. When the show reached Australia in February 2008, there had been 400 performances seen by 500,000 patrons. The show toured the United Kingdom, various parts of Europe, the United States, Australia, Canada and various parts of Asia.

== Harvey Goldsmith ==
The English music and arts promoter Harvey Goldsmith presented a three-month tour of The Merchants of Bollywood in UK during 2006. The show's Premier was at the Alexandra Theatre Birmingham on 24 October 2006 and the final show of the UK tour took place at the Apollo Theatre, London on 21 December 2006. A six-month tour of Europe followed in 2007.

== 2006 Tour Schedule ==
- Birmingham Alexandra Theatre - 24 October to 4 November 2006
- Manchester Opera House - 6 to 11 November 2006
- Newcastle Upon Tyne Journal Tyne Theatre - 13 to 17 November 2006
- Glasgow Clyde Auditorium - 20 to 26 November 2006
- Bradford St George's Hall - 28 November to 2 December 2006
- Cambridge Corn Exchange - 5 to 9 December 2006
- Wales Millennium Centre Cardiff - 12 to 17 December 2006
- London Apollo Theatre - 21 December 2006 to 7 January 2007

== Publicity ==
- Asian magazine AIM Anon 7 July 2006
- The Merchants of Bollywood Anon 10 November 2008. Thisistheatre.com
- the Merchants of Bollywood Editors choice 18 December 2006. Ethnicnow.com
- The Merchants of Bollywood Arifa Akbar 7 July 2006. The Independent.com

== Reviews ==
- "The Merchants of Bollywood". Perth Now. 13 February 2008. Archived from the original on 13 March 2008.
- The Merchants of Bollywood Richard Edmonds 27 October 2006. Stage review.
- The Merchants of Bollywood Mike Smith 18 December 2006. Theatreinwales.com
- The Merchants of Bollywood Kashif Naveed 7 November 2006. EntertaimnmentManchester.com
- The Merchants of Bollywood Sam Marlowe 23 December 2006. Thetimesonline.co.uk
