= Manish Malhotra =

Indian fashion designer (born 1966)

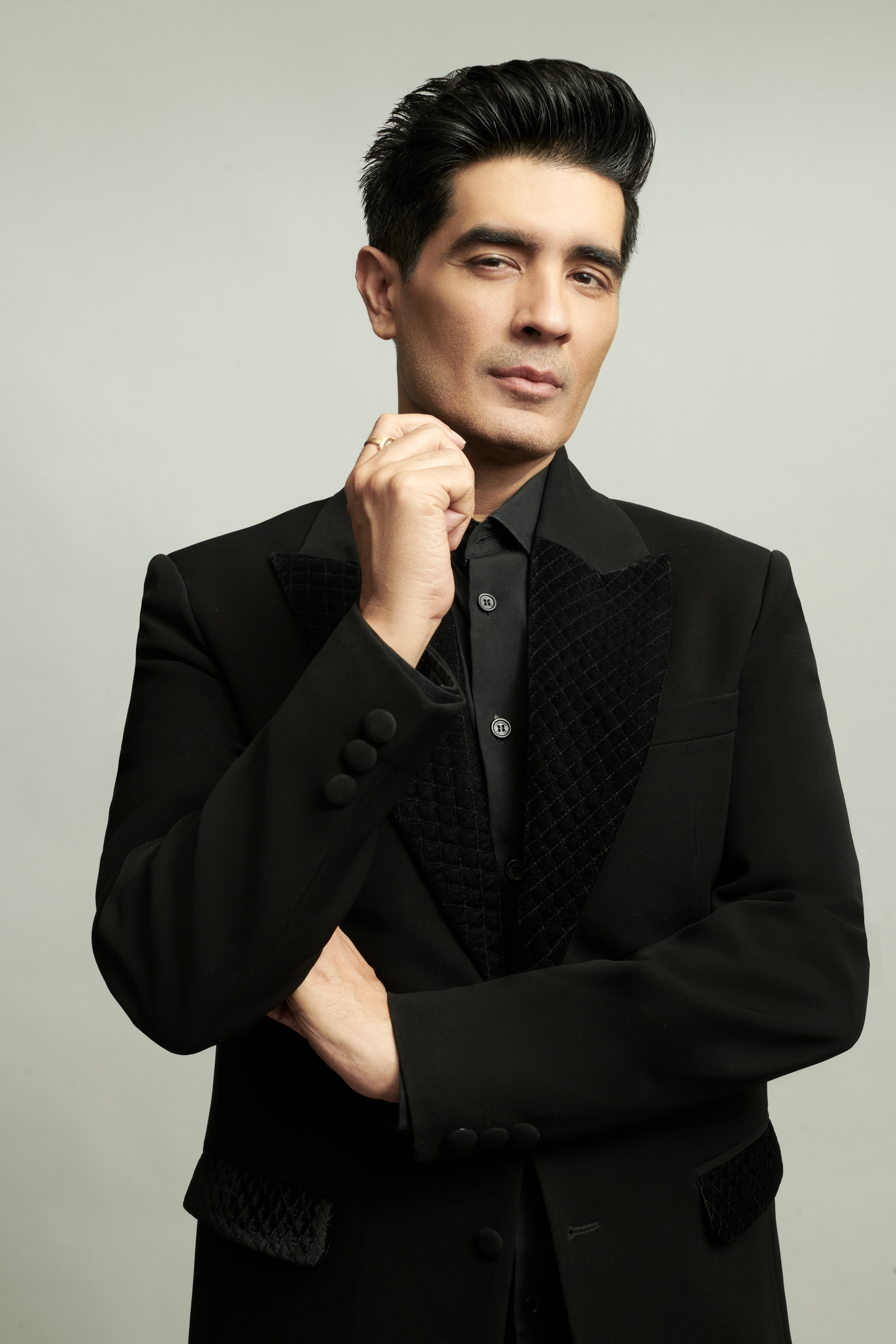
- Manish Malhotra
- Born: 5 December 1966 (age 59); Mumbai, Maharashtra, India
- Education: Elphinstone College
- Occupation: Fashion Designer
- Website: manishmalhotra.in

Manish Malhotra (born 5 December 1966) is an Indian fashion designer, couturier, costume stylist, entrepreneur, filmmaker, and revivalist based in Mumbai, India.

The founder of the eponymous label, Manish Malhotra, he sometimes took part in the narration and scripting to develop film costumes. Malhotra received the Priyadarshini Memorial Award for his contribution to the fashion industry and the Filmfare Award for Best Costume Design in 1996 for the film Rangeela (1995).

Manish Malhotra has launched two other new ventures – Manish Malhotra High Jewellery and a film production company called Stage5 Production. As of January 2025, his net worth is estimated to be US$300 million. Malhotra has walked the Met Gala red carpet in Manhattan twice: in 2024 and 2025.

== Costume design filmography ==
Year	Film	Actors Designed for
1990	Swarg	Juhi Chawla
1993	Lootere	Juhi Chawla
1993	Waqt Hamara Hai	Ayesha Jhulka
1993	Gumrah jeet ki bazi	Sridevi
1994	Govinda Govinda (Telugu)	Sridevi
1994	Yeh Dillagi	Kajol
1995	Prem	Tabu
1995	Dilwale Dulhania Le Jayenge	Kajol
1995	Rangeela	Urmila Matondkar
1996	Khamoshi: The Musical	Manisha Koirala
1996	Indian (Tamil)	Manisha Koirala and Urmila Matondkar
1996	Raja Hindustani	Karisma Kapoor
1996	Army	Sridevi
1997	Gupt: The Hidden Truth	Manisha Koirala and Kajol
1997	Hero No. 1	Karisma Kapoor
1997	Ziddi	Raveena Tandon
1997	Koyla	Madhuri Dixit
1997	Dil To Pagal Hai	Madhuri Dixit and Karisma Kapoor
1997	Daava	Raveena Tandon and Divya Dutta
1997	Judaai	Sridevi and Urmila Matondkar
1997	Deewana Mastana	Juhi Chawla
1997	Daud	Urmila Matondkar
1998	Duplicate	Juhi Chawla, Sonali Bendre and Kajol (Special Appearance)
1998	Badmaash	Shilpa Shirodkar
1998	Jab Pyaar Kisise Hota Hai	Twinkle Khanna
1998	Dushman	Kajol
1998	Ghulam	Rani Mukerji
1998	Satya	Urmila Matondkar
1998	Dil Se..	Manisha Koirala, and Preity Zinta
1998	Barood	Raveena Tandon
1998	Soldier	Preity Zinta
1998	Kuch Kuch Hota Hai	Kajol and Rani Mukerji
1999	Khoobsurat	Urmila Matondkar
1999	Dil Kya Kare	Kajol and Mahima Chaudhry
1999	Mast	Urmila Matondkar
1999	Dillagi	Urmila Matondkar
1999	Kaun?	Urmila Matondkar
1999	Jaanam Samjha Karo	Urmila Matondkar
2000	Mela	Twinkle Khanna and Aishwarya Rai
2000	Kaho Naa... Pyaar Hai	Hrithik Roshan and Ameesha Patel
2000	Jungle	Urmila Matondkar
2000	Chal Mere Bhai	Karisma Kapoor
2000	Deewane	Urmila Matondkar
2000	Kunwara	Urmila Matondkar
2000	Hamara Dil Aapke Paas Hai	Aishwarya Rai
2000	Mohabbatein	Aishwarya Rai, Shamita Shetty, Preeti Jhangiani and Kim Sharma
2000	Dhadkan	Shilpa Shetty and Mahima Chaudhry
2000	Pukar	Madhuri Dixit
2001	Akasa Veedhilo(Telugu)	Raveena Tandon
2001	Nayak	Rani Mukerji
2001	Ek Rishtaa: The Bond of Love	Juhi Chawla and Karisma Kapoor
2001	Murari(Telugu)	Sonali Bendre
2001	Ajnabee	Kareena Kapoor and Bipasha Basu
2001	Love Ke Liye Kuch Bhi Karega	Sonali Bendre and Twinkle Khanna
2001	Aśoka	Kareena Kapoor
2001	Pyaar Tune Kya Kiya	Urmila Matondkar
	Kabhi Khushi Kabhie Gham	Jaya Bachchan, Kajol, Kareena Kapoor and Rani Mukerji (Extended Special Appearance)
2002	Haan Maine Bhi Pyaar Kiya	Karisma Kapoor
2002	Mujhse Dosti Karoge!	Rani Mukerji and Kareena Kapoor
2002	Manmadhudu (Telugu)	Sonali Bendre
2002	Om Jai Jagadish	Waheeda Rehman, Mahima Chaudhry, Urmila Matondkar and Tara Sharma
2002	Deewangee	Urmila Matondkar
2002	Saathiya	Rani Mukerji
2002	Company	Manisha Koirala
2002	Jeena Sirf Merre Liye	Kareena Kapoor
2002	Mere Yaar Ki Shaadi Hai	Bipasha Basu and Tulip Joshi
2003	Talaash: The Hunt Begins...	Kareena Kapoor
2003	Chalte Chalte	Rani Mukerji
2003	Bhoot	Urmila Matondkar
2003	Baghban	Hema Malini
2003	Kuch Naa Kaho	Aishwarya Rai
2003	Andaaz	Lara Dutta and Priyanka Chopra
2003	Main Prem Ki Diwani Hoon	Kareena Kapoor
2003	Kal Ho Naa Ho	Jaya Bachchan, Shah Rukh Khan, Saif Ali Khan, Preity Zinta, Sonali Bendre (Special Appearance), Kajol and Rani Mukerji (Special Appearance in item number "Maahi Ve")
2004	Vanity Fair	Reese Witherspoon
2004	Hum Tum	Rani Mukerji
2004	Ek Hasina Thi	Urmila Matondkar
2004	Fida	Kareena Kapoor
2004	Yuva	Rani Mukerji, Kareena Kapoor and Esha Deol
2004	Main Hoon Na	Sushmita Sen and Amrita Rao
2004	Hulchul	Kareena Kapoor
2004	Aitraaz	Kareena Kapoor and Priyanka Chopra
2004	Veer-Zaara	Shah Rukh Khan, Preity Zinta and Rani Mukerji
2004	Chameli	Kareena Kapoor
2005	Naina	Urmila Matondkar
2005	Bewafaa	Kareena Kapoor, Sushmita Sen and Shamita Shetty
2005	Kyaa Kool Hai Hum	Isha Koppikar and Neha Dhupia
2005	Barsaat	Priyanka Chopra and Bipasha Basu
2005	Maine Pyaar Kyun Kiya?	Sushmita Sen and Katrina Kaif
2005	Kaal	Lara Dutta and Esha Deol
2006	Fanaa	Kajol
2006	Kabhi Alvida Naa Kehna	Amitabh Bachchan, Shah Rukh Khan, Abhishek Bachchan, Rani Mukerji, Preity Zinta, Kirron Kher, Arjun Rampal and Kajol (Special Appearance in Item Number "Rock n' Roll Soniye")
2006	Krrish	Rekha and Priyanka Chopra
2006	Naksha	Sameera Reddy
2006	I See You	Sophie Choudry
2007	Salaam-e-Ishq: A Tribute to Love	Priyanka Chopra, Vidya Balan, Juhi Chawla, Ayesha Takia, Anjana Sukhani and Perizaad Zorabian
2007	Shakalaka Boom Boom	Celina Jaitly and Kangana Ranaut
2007	Sivaji: The Boss (Tamil)	Rajinikanth, Shriya Saran, Vivek and Nayanthara (Special Appearance)
2007	Laaga Chunari Mein Daag	Jaya Bachchan, Rani Mukerji and Konkona Sen Sharma
2007	Aaja Nachle	Madhuri Dixit
2007	Om Shanti Om	Shah Rukh Khan, Deepika Padukone, Shreyas Talpade, Arjun Rampal and Kirron Kher, Rani Mukerji, Vidya Balan, Priyanka Chopra, Shilpa Shetty, Shabana Azmi, Urmila Matondkar, Karisma Kapoor, Malaika Arora, Amrita Arora, Juhi Chawla, Tabu, Kajol, Preity Zinta, Rekha and Lara Dutta (Special Appearances in Item Number "Deewangi Deewangi")
2007	Jab We Met	Kareena Kapoor
2007	Aag	Sushmita Sen
2008	U Me Aur Hum	Kajol
2008	Tashan	Kareena Kapoor
2008	Thoda Pyaar Thoda Magic	Rani Mukerji and Ameesha Patel
2008	Short Kut - The Con is On	Amrita Rao
2008	Dostana	Priyanka Chopra and Shilpa Shetty (Special Appearance in Item Number "Shut Up and Bounce")
2009	Blue	Lara Dutta, Katrina Kaif and Kylie Minogue (Special Appearance in Item Number "Chiggy Whiggy")
2009	Dil Bole Hadippa!	Rani Mukerji
2009	Kurbaan	Kareena Kapoor
2009	3 Idiots	Kareena Kapoor
2009	Billu	Lara Dutta, Kareena Kapoor (Special Appearance in Item Number "Marjaani"), Deepika Padukone (Special Appearance in Item Number "Love Meera Hit Hit") and Priyanka Chopra (Special Appearance in Item Number "You Get Me Rockin' and Reeling")
2009	Wake Up Sid	Ranbir Kapoor and Konkona Sen Sharma
2010	My Name Is Khan	Shah Rukh Khan and Kajol
2010	We Are Family	Kajol and Kareena Kapoor
2010	Pyaar Impossible!	Priyanka Chopra
2010	I Hate Luv Storys	Sonam Kapoor and Imran Khan
2010	Enthiran (Tamil)	Aishwarya Rai Bachchan
2010	Action Replayy	Aishwarya Rai Bachchan
2010	Anjaana Anjaani	Priyanka Chopra
2010	I Am	Juhi Chawla, Manisha Koirala and Radhika Apte
2011	Bodyguard	Kareena Kapoor
2011	Rockstar	Nargis Fakhri
2011	Ra.One	Kareena Kapoor and Shah Rukh Khan
2012	Agneepath	Priyanka Chopra and Katrina Kaif (Special Appearance in Item Number "Chikni Chameli")
2012	Ek Main Aur Ekk Tu	Kareena Kapoor and Imran Khan
2012	Agent Vinod	Kareena Kapoor
2012	Dangerous Ishhq	Karisma Kapoor
2012	Teri Meri Kahaani	Priyanka Chopra
2012	Heroine	Kareena Kapoor
2012	Student of the Year	Alia Bhatt, Kajol (Special Appearance in song "The Disco Song")
2012	Jab Tak Hai Jaan	Katrina Kaif and Anushka Sharma
2013	Yeh Jawaani Hai Deewani	Deepika Padukone and Ranbir Kapoor, Madhuri Dixit (Special Appearance in Item Number "Ghagra")
2013	Chennai Express	Deepika Padukone
2013	Krrish 3	Priyanka Chopra and Kangana Ranaut
2013	Gori Tere Pyaar Mein	Kareena Kapoor and Imran Khan
2013	R... Rajkumar	Sonakshi Sinha
2013	Once Upon a Time in Mumbai Dobaara!	Akshay Kumar, Sonakshi Sinha and Imran Khan
2013	Bombay Talkies	Madhuri Dixit, Karisma Kapoor, Juhi Chawla, Rani Mukerji, Sridevi, Priyanka Chopra, Vidya Balan, Kareena Kapoor, Sonam Kapoor and Deepika Padukone (Special Appearanceas in Item Number "Apna Bombay Talkies")
2014	2 States	Alia Bhatt
2014	Badtameez Dil	Kareena Kapoor
2014	Happy New Year	Deepika Padukone, Shah Rukh Khan, Abhishek Bachchan, Sonu Sood, Boman Irani, Vivaan Shah and Jackie Shroff
2015	Puli (Tamil)	Sridevi
2015	Detective Byomkesh Bakshy!	Swastika Mukherjee and Divya Menon
2015	Bajrangi Bhaijaan	Kareena Kapoor
2016	Ae Dil Hai Mushkil	Anushka Sharma, Aishwarya Rai Bachchan and Lisa Haydon (Cameo Appearance)
2016	Ki & Ka	Kareena Kapoor and Jaya Bachchan
2016	Fitoor	Tabu and Katrina Kaif
2016	Dishoom	Jacqueline Fernandez
2017	Badrinath Ki Dulhania	Alia Bhatt
2017	Mom	Sridevi
2017	Judwaa 2	Jacqueline Fernandez and Taapsee Pannu
2018	Race 3	Jacqueline Fernandez and Daisy Shah
2018	Baaghi 2	Jacqueline Fernandez (Special Appearance in Item Number "Ek Do Teen")
2018	Dhadak	Janhvi Kapoor
2018	Loveyatri	Warina Hussain
2018	Fanney Khan	Aishwarya Rai Bachchan
2018	Thugs of Hindostan	Katrina Kaif
2019	Kalank	Madhuri Dixit, Sonakshi Sinha, Alia Bhatt, Varun Dhawan, Aditya Roy Kapur, Sanjay Dutt, Kiara Advani and Kriti Sanon (Special Appearance in Item Number "Aira Gaira")
2019	Student of the Year 2	Tiger Shroff, Tara Sutaria, Ananya Panday and Alia Bhatt (Special Appearance in Item Number "The Hook Up Song")
TBA	Desi Magic	Ameesha Patel
2020	Ghost Stories	Mrunal Thakur
2021	Radhe	Disha Patani and Sapna Pabbi
2023	Rocky Aur Rani Kii Prem Kahaani	Jaya Bachchan, Shabana Azmi and Alia Bhatt
2021	Saali Mohabbat (producer)	
2026	Pati Patni Aur Woh Do	

== Awards ==
Filmfare Awards

- 1995 - Filmfare Award for Costume Design - Rangeela
- Filmfare Glamour & Style Award

Bollywood Movie Award

- 1999 Bollywood Award for Costume Design - Kuch Kuch Hota Hai
- 2002 Bollywood Awards Designer of Year - Kabhi Khushi Kabhie Gham
- 2005 Bollywood Awards Designer of Year - Veer-Zaara
- 2007 Bollywood Awards Designer of Year - Kabhi Alvida Naa Kehna

Zee Cine Award

- Zee Cine Award Zee Cine Award for Costume Design
- Zee Cine Award for Best Costume for Mohabbatein
- Zee Cine Award - Zenith 'London' for Best Costume in 2008

IIFA Awards

- 2001 IIFA Award for Best Costume - Mohabbatein
- 2002 IIFA Award for Best Costume for Kabhi Khushi Kabhie Gham
- 2004 IIFA Award for Best Costume for Kal Ho Naa Ho
- Wizcraft Samsung IIFA Award for Costume Designing
- 2017 IIFA Award for Best Costume Designing.

Filmfare Awards South

- 2010 Filmfare Awards South for Costume Design - Enthiran

Iconic Gold Awards

- 2022 Iconic Gold Awards for Iconic Outstanding Contribution in Bollywood Fashion.
