= K. K. Singh =

Indian screenwriter

- Portrait of K. K. Singh
- Died: 2011; Mumbai, Maharashtra, India
- Occupations: Screenwriter actor film director film producer
- Years active: 1982–2011
- Notable work: Krantiveer; Veergati; Sham Ghansham
- Awards: Filmfare Award for Best Dialogue; Filmfare Award for Best Story

K. K. Singh (died 2011) was an Indian screenwriter and has film director-producer credits for Veergati and actor credits for Sham Ghansham. Singh had written scripts primarily for Bollywood films and has worked in a regional-language Bhojpuri film "Aulaad" directed by Aslam Sheikh. He debuted in Hindi-language films in 1982, with Raj Kapoor's film Prem Rog as an assistant director, and was honoured with several awards including Filmfare Award for Best Dialogue and Filmfare Award for Best Story writer.

== Life and background ==
Singh was initially working in Hindi cinema as an additional dialogue writer. His first film as an assistant director was Raj Kapoor's Prem Rog. He was also the writer of the Rahul Rawail directed film Yodha (1991). He also produced and directed the film Veergati, starring Salman Khan. It was 1998 when he worked as an actor in Sham Ghansham film director by Ashok Ghai.

== Awards ==
He has written over 25 films including Raj Kapoor's last film Ram Teri Ganga Maili. Filmfare Award for Best Dialogue and Filmfare Award for Best Story were conferred to him during 40th Filmfare Awards held in 1995 for the film Krantiveer.

== Filmography ==
Year	Title	Role
1982	Prem Rog	Asst. director
1984	Insaaf Kaun Karega	Dialogue
1985	Ram Teri Ganga Maili	Screenplay and dialogues
1987	Sansar	Dialogue
1988	Paap Ko Jalaa Kar Raakh Kar Doonga	Dialogue
1989	Tridev	Dialogue
1989	Jurrat	Screenwriter
1991	Yodha	Screenplay, story and dialogues
1993	Gurudev	Dialogue
1994	Teesra Kaun	Screenwriter
1994	Krantiveer	Screenwriter
1996	Veergati	Producer/Director
1998	Sham Ghansham	Actor
1999	Silsila Hai Pyar Ka	Dialogue
1999	Jaanwar	Dialogue
2000	Kurukshetra	Dialogue
2001	Ek Rishtaa: The Bond of Love	Screenwriter
2002	Pitaah	Dialogue
2002	Jaani Dushman: Ek Anokhi Kahani	Dialogue
2003	Talaash: The Hunt Begins	Screenwriter
2004	Jaago	Screenplay, story and dialogues
2005	Barsaat: A Sublime Love Story	Dialogue
2005	Dosti: Friends Forever	Screenplay
2006	Mere Jeevan Saathi	Dialogue
2011	Aulaad	Screenwriter
