= Robin Bhatt =

Indian Film Writer

- Born: 10 March 1946 (age 79); Mumbai
- Occupation: Screenwriter
- Years active: 1990–present
- Parents: Nanabhai Bhatt (father); Hemlata Bhatt (mother)
- Relatives: Bhatt family

Robin Bhatt is an Indian screenwriter who works in Hindi films. He is the elder half-brother of Mahesh Bhatt and Mukesh Bhatt and son of Nanabhai Bhatt. He has written many films and was nominated thrice and won an award for Baazigar. He was honoured with a Lifetime Achievement Award at Jaipur International Film Festival-JIFF in 2019. His debut film as writer was Aashiqui. He has written many films for Bhatt Productions.

Besides writing, he has also worked as an actor and an assistant. In his 20-year-long career he has written about 66 films and acted in more than 10 Hindi Films such as Chalte Chalte, Golmaal Returns, and U Me Aur Hum. He was nominated for Omkara, Koi Mil Gaya and Krrish and won an award for Baazigar for best screenplay.

== Personal life ==
Bhatt was born to film director Nanabhai Bhatt and his second wife Hemlata Bhatt.

Among his half-siblings are producer Mukesh Bhatt and director-producer Mahesh Bhatt. Actresses Pooja Bhatt and Alia Bhatt are his nieces and actors Rahul Bhatt, Emraan Hashmi and Mohit Suri are his nephews.

== Filmography ==
- Jaan Ki Baazi (1985)
- Aashiqui (1990)
- Dil Hai Ke Manta Nahin (1991)
- Saathi (1991)
- Sadak (1992)
- Junoon (1992)
- Pehchaan (1993)
- Platform (1993)
- Hum Hain Rahi Pyaar Ke (1993)
- Gumraah (1993)
- Baazigar (1993)
- Dhanwaan (1994)
- Tadipaar (1994)
- Aatish (1995)
- Milan (1995)
- Gaddar (1995)
- Zamaana Deewana (1995)
- Hum Dono (1995)
- Chaahat (1996)
- Raja Hindustani (1996)
- Itihaas (1996)
- Betaabi (1997)
- Duplicate (1998)
- Major Saab (1998)
- Angaaray (1998)
- Daag: The Fire (1998)
- Kartoos (1999)
- Jaanwar (1999)
- Mela (2000)
- Badal (2000)
- Tera Jadoo Chal Gayaa (2000)
- Raju Chacha (2000)
- Ek Rishtaa (2001)
- Ajnabee (2001)
- Aap Mujhe Achche Lagne Lage (2002)
- Yeh Raaste Hain Pyaar Ke (2002)
- Ab Ke Baras (2002)
- Hum Kisise Kum Nahin (2002)
- Talaash: The Hunt Begins... (2003)
- Andaaz (2003)
- Chalte Chalte (2003)
- Koi Mil Gaya (2003)
- Zameen (2003)
- Jodi Kya Banayi Wah Wah Ramji (2004)
- Aetbaar (2004)
- Kismat (2004)
- Woh (2004)
- Elaan (2005)
- Blackmail (2005)
- Bachke Rehna Re Baba (2005)
- Barsaat (2005)
- Dosti: Friends Forever (2005)
- Mere Jeevan Saathi (2006)
- Krrish (2006)
- Omkara (2006)
- Sarhad Paar (2007)
- Ek Chalis Ki Last Local (2007)
- Sunday (2008)
- U Me Aur Hum (2008)
- Aamir (2008)
- Mehbooba (2008)
- Ghajini (2008)
- Billu Barber (2009)
- All The Best: Fun Begins (2009)
- Atithi Tum Kab Jaoge? (2010)
- Aakrosh (2010)
- Golmaal 3 (2010)
- Tezz (2012)
- Krrish 3 (2013)
- Teri Meri Kahaani (2013)
- Grand Masti (2013)
- Jazbaa (2015)
- Shivaay (2016)
