= Andaaz 2 =

2025 Indian drama film

- Theatrical release poster
- Directed by: Suneel Darshan
- Written by: Suneel Darshan; Parasnath Gupta; Sourabh Ratnu; Preeti Mamgain; Dipan Bhatt
- Produced by: Suneel Darshan
- Starring: Aayush Kumar; Aakaisha; Natasha Fernandez
- Cinematography: Chetan Dholi
- Edited by: Kaushik Chakraborty
- Music by: Nadeem Saifi
- Production company: Shree Krishna International
- Release date: 8 August 2025
- Running time: 146 minutes
- Country: India
- Language: Hindi

Andaaz 2 is a 2025 Indian Hindi-language romantic drama film directed and produced by Suneel Darshan. The film stars debutants Aayush Kumar, Aakaisha, and Natasha Fernandez. It is the sequel to the 2003 film Andaaz. The film released on August 8, 2025, to negative reviews.

== Cast ==
- Aayush Kumar as Aarav
- Aakaisha Vats as Alisha
- Natasha Fernandez as Priyanka
- Parmarth Singh as Ehsaan
- Srikant Maski as Tony
- Puja Sharma
- Neetu Pandey
- Sanjay Mehandirata
- Bharat Bhatia
- Dolly Bindra
- Jeetu Verma as Yeda Anna

== Production ==
The film has been shot across various location across Allahabad and Haryana.

== Music ==
All songs have been composed by Nadeem Saifi of the Nadeem–Shravan duo. The lyrics are written by Sameer Anjaan.The vocals have been lent by singers including Shaan, Neeraj Shridhar, Palak Muchhal, Javed Ali, Amit Mishra, Shadab Faridi, Debanjali, and Asees Kaur.

No.	Title	Singer(s)	Length
1.	"Tere Bin Kahin Dil Na Lagey""	Mohammed Irfan, Palak Muchhal
2.	"You Are Beautiful"	Javed Ali, Palak Muchhal
3.	"Ishq Junooni Hai"	Neeraj Shridhar
4.	"Rabba Ishq Na Hove 2.0"	Palak Muchhal, Asees Kaur, Shadab Faridi
5.	"Kitni Pyaari Si"	Javed Ali
6.	"Hum Jaise Jee Rahe Hain"	Amit Mishra
7.	"Waqt Ne Kiya Iss Qadar Sitam"	Mohammed Irfan, Palak Muchhal
8.	"Shammak"	Shaan, Debanjali B Joshi

== Reception ==
Mayur Sanap of Rediff.com gave one-half star out of 5 and said that "The sheer awfulness of Andaaz 2 really doesn't deserve anyone's time or attention." Bollywood Hungama rated it 1.5/5 stars and commented that "On the whole, ANDAAZ 2 is embellished with great music but it suffers on account of a weak script and poor direction." Bhawna Arya of Times Now gave 2.5 stars out of 5 and said that "In conclusion, weak performances, a loosely written script and a poor screenplay of the film fail to recreate the magic of the iconic film Andaaz."

Subhash K Jha writing for News 24 gave 3 stars out of 5 and observed that "Suneel Darshan’s unabashed homage to the cinema of the 1970s is sweet, tender, sometimes overdone but never offensive."
