= Yeh Mohabbat Hai =

2002 Indian film by Umesh Mehra

- Theatrical release poster
- Directed by: Umesh Mehra
- Written by: Umesh Mehra; Rafiq Taluqdar; Milap Zaveri (dialogue)
- Produced by: Prem Krishen; Sunil Mehta; Umesh Mehra
- Starring: Rahul Bhat; Johnny Lever; Parikshit Sahni; Akanksha Malhotra; Danny Denzongpa
- Music by: Anand Raj Anand
- Distributed by: Cinevistaas Limited
- Release date: 8 February 2002
- Country: India
- Language: Hindi

Yeh Mohabbat Hai is a 2002 Indian Hindi-language action film directed by Umesh Mehra, starring Rahul Bhat, Johnny Lever, Parikshit Sahni, Akanksha Malhotra, Mohnish Behl, Gulshan Grover, Arbaaz Khan, Nasir Khan and Danny Denzongpa.

== Plot ==
Yeh Mohabbat Hai revolves around Chand and Shaheen, who have been lovers since childhood. But her brother Shaukat is opposite from them. Chand gathers his team to play a cricket game. Due to his naivety, he gets trapped in the terrorist links of Abdul Jameel. Police Inspector Chauthe claims that he has sufficient evidence to convict Chand. Shaheen believes that Chand is innocent, and till he proves his innocence, she will not marry him. So with the help of his friends Jaggi, Raj, and Gullu, they set out to prove his innocence.

== Cast ==
- Rahul Bhat - Chand
- Akanksha Malhotra - Shaheen
- Nasir Khan - Raj, Hotel owner
- Pinky Campbell - Rohini
- Johnny Lever - Jaggi
- Parikshit Sahni - Chand's dad
- Danny Denzongpa - Amaan Khan
- Mohnish Behl - Shaukat
- Gulshan Grover - Gullu
- Arbaaz Khan - Abdul Jameel
- Shakti Kapoor - Baggad Singh
- Rakesh Bedi - Chacha
- Anjana Mumtaz - Chand's Mother
- Dolly Bindra - Jyoti
- Sadashiv Amrapurkar - Police Inspector
- Avtar Gill - Gafoor Khan
- Rana Jung Bahadur -
- Pappu Polyester - Aooh : First appear as wicket-keeper in the cricket scene
- Shama Sikander - Special Appearance in song 'Aaj Ghar Piya Viraje'

== Music ==
All lyrics by Dev Kohli. Music by Anand Raj Anand

1. "Yeh Dil Deewana Hai" - Kavita Krishnamurthy, Abhijeet
2. "Chand Samne Hai" - Alka Yagnik, Sonu Nigam
3. "Aaj Ghar Piya Mila De" - Shubha Mudgal
4. "Mar Gayi Chhokri" - Sapna Awasthi, Sunidhi Chauhan
5. "Bechain Meraa Yeh Dil Hai" - Alka Yagnik, Udit Narayan
6. "Chill, Chill, Chill Man" - Harry Anand, Shaan, Sunidhi Chauhan

== Filming ==
The film was shot in Khiva, Boysun, and Tashkent in Uzbekistan.
