= Mere Jeevan Saathi (2006 film) =

2006 Indian film by Suneel Darshan

- Directed by: Suneel Darshan
- Written by: Suneel Darshan (story), Robin Bhatt (screenplay), K.K. Singh (dialogue)
- Produced by: Suneel Darshan, Suraj Prakash
- Starring: Akshay Kumar; Karishma Kapoor; Amisha Patel; Gulshan Grover
- Music by: Songs: Nadeem–Shravan; Background Score: Salim–Sulaiman
- Distributed by: Shree Krishna International Pvt. Ltd.
- Release date: 3 February 2006
- Language: Hindi
- Budget: ₹11 crore
- Box office: ₹7.82 crore

Mere Jeevan Saathi (English: My life partner) is a 2006 Indian Hindi-language romantic drama film starring Akshay Kumar, Karisma Kapoor and Ameesha Patel. It was supposed to release in 2004, but due to delays it was pushed back and was finally released in February 2006.

== Synopsis ==
Vicky is an aspiring singer who is devoted to his true love, Anjali. He gets a big offer from a music company in America and accepts it. In America, he meets the owner of the company, Angel Music,Natasha. Natasha helps Vicky become a star, however, Vicky is unaware of Natasha's hidden motives. Natasha knew Vicky in college and harboured a deep infatuation for him, even helping him through his struggling phase. Natasha's father had warned her that her love for Vicky can never be, as Vicky loved Anjali, but she refused to listen. When Natasha's father died in a car accident, Natasha, with no one else to love, put all her love and devotion on Vicky aside, and has been alone ever since. She has all these posters of him and agrees to help him make him famous.

Natasha invites Vicky to her home for her birthday. Things heat up and Vicky and Natasha have an affair. Vicky is horrified by what he has done. He goes back to India, but Natasha accompanies him on the plane. An uncomfortable Vicky tells Natasha that their one night together was a mistake and that he only loves Anjali. Natasha then attempts suicide (these graphic scenes are cut)but Vicky rushes her to the hospital in time. Vicky proposes to Anjali and she accepts. Natasha discovers that Vicky and Anjali are engaged. At the engagement party, Natasha, mad with jealousy, starts dancing barefoot on broken glass until she faints. Vicky later tells her to stay away from him. Natasha hires hitmen to plant a bomb in Vicky's car. Vicky realizes that Natasha's obsession with him has become dangerous. Overwhelmed with guilt, he confesses the truth to Anjali. Although hurt, she is not angry at him as he has punished himself enough. Anjali then insists on meeting with Natasha.

The two women meet and Anjali gently explains that Vicky has always loved her and never Natasha. Natasha threatens Anjali, saying that she will go to any length for Vicky – even kill. Anjali admits that while she cannot kill others, she would kill herself for him, Vicky’s sole purpose is and always will be Anjali. When Anjali returns to Vicky, Natasha calls the couple to her home. The two arrive and see Natasha sitting in a chair. As they are apologizing for hurting her, they suddenly notice a gun in Natasha's hand and blood on her head. She had killed herself before the two arrived. Vicky finds a note that she had written, saying that by sacrificing her life, she proved that she will always love him. The film ends with Natasha's funeral and Anjali in Vicky's arms.

== Cast ==
- Akshay Kumar as Vicky Bahl
- Karisma Kapoor as Natasha Arora
- Ameesha Patel as Anjali Saluja
- Gulshan Grover as Morani
- Ashish Vidyarthi as Torani
- Alok Nath as Mr. Bahl, Vicky's dad
- Maya Alagh as Mrs. Bahl, Vicky's mom
- Rakesh Bedi as Mac
- Razak Khan as Tarzan

== Soundtrack ==
Mere Jeevan Saathi

Soundtrack album by Nadeem–Shravan
- Released: 2006
- Recorded: 2001–2002
- Venue: Mumbai
- Genre: Feature film soundtrack
- Length: 32:19
- Language: Hindi
- Label: Shreekrishna International
- Producer: Nadeem-Shravan

Nadeem–Shravan chronology
| Dosti: Friends Forever (2006) | Mere Jeevan Saathi (2006) | Gumnaam – The Mystery (2008) |

The music of the film was composed Nadeem-Shravan and the lyrics were penned by Sameer Popularly known as Sameer Anjaan. The soundtrack was released in 2006 on Audio Cassette, LP record and Audio CDs by Shreekrishna Audio, and consists of seven tracks. The full album is recorded by Sadhna Sargam, Alisha Chinai, Kumar Sanu, Udit Narayan, Abhijeet Bhattacharya, Sonu Nigam, Alka Yagnik, and Shaan.

| # | Title | Singer(s) |
|---|---|---|
| 1 | "Tumko Dulhan Banayenge" (Title Track) | Kumar Sanu, Sadhana Sargam |
| 2 | "Tum Bin Na Hum Jee Sakenge" | Udit Narayan, Alka Yagnik |
| 3 | "Deewani" | Abhijeet Bhattacharya, Sadhana Sargam |
| 4 | "Mere Jeevan Saathi" | Sonu Nigam |
| 5 | "Har Taraf Aapki Tasveer" | Alka Yagnik |
| 6 | "Ek Masoom Sa" | Sonu Nigam, Sadhana Sargam |
| 7 | "Mashooqa" | Shaan, Alisha Chinai |
