= Suneel Darshan =

Indian film director

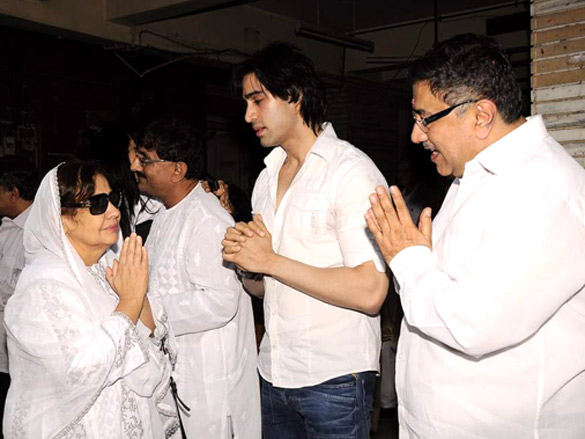
Farida Jalal at Sunil and Dharmesh Darshan’s dad’s prayer meet

Suneel Darshan is an Indian filmmaker, film director, producer and writer who works in the Bollywood industry. He was born into Bhatt family.

== Biography ==
Darshan began his career in 1987 as a film producer. He produced the film Inteqam, which starred Sunny Deol and Anil Kapoor. In 1993, he produced the film Lootere, which was directed by his brother Dharmesh Darshan, who made his directional debut with the film. The movie did well at the box office and the brothers went on to collaborate several times after that.

Suneel himself made his directional debut in 1996 with the action movie Ajay. Darshan also produced the film and wrote the dialogue for the film. The movie starred Sunny Deol and Karisma Kapoor, and did well at the box office, despite a theatre strike in Maharashtra in January 1997.

In 1999, Darshan directed and produced the action drama Jaanwar. The film marked his first collaboration with Akshay Kumar, and the film became a hit. The movie also starred Karisma Kapoor and Shilpa Shetty.

Darshan's next film was Ek Rishtaa (2001), which was written, directed and produced by him. The film starred Amitabh Bachchan, Akshay Kumar, Karisma Kapoor and Juhi Chawla. It was one of the highest grossers of the year. It was well received and critically appreciated.

After that he produced Andaaz (2003), which was a big hit, Barsaat and Dosti: Friends Forever (2005) which was one of the year's biggest hits overseas. His most recent film Shakalaka Boom Boom performed poorly at the box office.

After a seven-year hiatus Darshan launched his son Shiv Darshan in his film Karle Pyaar Karle (2014). The film was declared a disaster at the Indian box office.

== Filmography ==
Year	Film	Role(s)
1988	Inteqam	Producer
1993	Lootere	Producer
1996	Ajay	Director, producer, writer
1999	Jaanwar	Director, producer, story writer
2000	Mela	Story Writer
2001	Ek Rishtaa	Director, producer, writer
2002	Haan Maine Bhi Pyaar Kiya	Producer
2003	Talaash	Director, writer
2003	Andaaz	Producer
2005	Barsaat	Director, producer, writer
2005	Dosti	Director, producer, writer
2006	Mere Jeevan Saathi	Director, writer
2007	Shakalaka Boom Boom	Director, producer, writer
2014	Karle Pyaar Karle	Producer
2017	Ek Haseena Thi Ek Deewana Tha	Director, producer, writer
2025	Andaaz 2	Director, producer, writer
