= Andaaz =

2003 film by Raj Kanwar

- Theatrical release poster
- Directed by: Raj Kanwar
- Written by: Robin Bhatt; Shyam Goel; Jainendra Jain
- Produced by: Suneel Darshan
- Starring: Akshay Kumar; Lara Dutta; Priyanka Chopra
- Cinematography: Ishwar R. Bidri
- Edited by: Sanjay Sankla
- Music by: Songs: Nadeem-Shravan; Score: Naresh Sharma
- Production company: Shree Krishna International
- Release date: 23 May 2003
- Running time: 149 minutes
- Country: India
- Language: Hindi
- Budget: ₹9.25 crore
- Box office: ₹28.81 crore

Andaaz (transl. Style) is a 2003 Indian Hindi-language romantic drama film directed by Raj Kanwar, written by Robin Bhatt, Shyam Goel and Jainendra Jain, and produced by Suneel Darshan. The film stars Akshay Kumar, Lara Dutta (in her acting debut), and Priyanka Chopra. Shot extensively in the West Indies, Andaaz's promotion centered around the acting debuts of two beauty queens together for the first time, which Darshan considered was the film's main selling point.

The film's music was composed by Nadeem–Shravan, with lyrics written by Sameer. The soundtrack was a success, selling 2.5 million units and was the second best-selling Bollywood soundtrack of the year.

Andaaz was released in cinemas on 23 May 2003, and was a commercial success, grossing ₹288 million at the box-office against a budget of ₹ 80 million. It was the ninth-highest-grossing Indian film of the year. At the 49th Filmfare Awards, it received 7 nominations, including Best Film, Best Actor for Kumar, Best Supporting Actress for Chopra, and won Best Female Debut for Dutta and Chopra. Additionally, both actresses were also nominated for the Screen Award for Best Female Debut, which Dutta won.

== Plot ==
Raj Malhotra lives with his elder brother Rohit, his sister-in-law Kiran, and his niece. After an accident fractures his leg, he is unable to walk for some time, and for psychological reasons, he cannot walk even after the fracture heals. When the Malhotras move to Guntur, Raj befriends his family's new neighbour, the tomboy Kajal, as both share a common passion for aeroplanes. With Kajal's encouragement, Raj regains the ability to walk. Years later, the two continue to be close friends, and everyone expects them to marry soon. Raj secretly loves Kajal and is waiting for the right time to propose to her, but she sees him only as her best friend.

Raj is recruited by the Air India and spends a year and a half in training. After this is over, he rushes to Kajal to propose to her, only to discover that she is in love with multimillionaire businessman Karan Singhania. Raj still does not reveal his true feelings to Kajal, telling her that Karan is the best life partner for her. Kajal and Karan marry; during the reception party, Kajal learns of Raj's feelings for her. Dismayed by the fact that she did not recognise Raj's feelings for her despite being his best friend, Kajal asks him to move on with his life. Raj relocates to Cape Town, South Africa for further training, while his brother and family move to Kottayam.

During a visit to a club, Raj meets the vivacious and fun-loving Jiya. She falls in love with Raj because of his clean personality, but he is unable to forget Kajal. After completing his training, Raj returns to India where he finds that Jiya has already arrived and is living as a paying guest with his family in Nainital. Jiya makes several attempts to impress Raj, but he still does not fall for her. During Dussehra, Jiya performs the rituals that a wife typically does for a husband, but Raj becomes angry and asks Jiya to leave. After Raj's brother and sister-in-law reveal that they had hoped Raj would marry Jiya, he finally gives in and decides to marry her and move on with his life.

While visiting Jiya's family, Raj learns that Jiya is none other than the sister of Karan Singhania. Thus, Kajal is now Jiya's sister-in-law. Not only that, but it is revealed that Kajal has been widowed by a helicopter crash which killed Karan, but which she survived. Kajal blames herself for Karan's death and has even attempted suicide. Raj helps Kajal recover from her depression, which enables her to face life again. Jiya notices their increasing closeness and suggests to her father that a second marriage be arranged for the widowed and childless Kajal.

At Raj and Jiya's engagement, Kajal learns that her family is arranging an engagement for her as well. Raj urgently tells Kajal not to allow herself to be married off against her will. An angry Jiya says that Raj and Kajal will never be able to forget their past love for each other, even though Raj is supposed to be marrying her. An irate Raj places the wedding Tilak on Kajal's forehead, indicating he has now married Kajal. An emotional Jiya reveals that her real intention had been to compel Raj and Kajal to accept their feelings for each other in front of the world. The film ends with Jiya participating in Raj and Kajal's wedding ceremony.

== Cast ==
- Akshay Kumar as Raj Malhotra
- Lara Dutta as Kajal
- Priyanka Chopra as Jiya
- Aman Verma as Karan Singhania
- Pankaj Dheer as Prof. Rohit Malhotra
- Navni Parihar as Kiran Rohit Malhotra
- Johnny Lever as "G.I.Joe"
- Rajeev Verma as Ishwar Singhania, Karan and Jiya's father
- Gajendra Chauhan as Dilip Sahay
- Vivek Shauq as Raunak
- Prithvi Zutshi as Vipin Singhania, Ishwar's brother
- Vishwajeet Pradhan as Vivek Singhania, Ishwar's brother
- Kushal Punjabi as Monty
- Asha Sharma as Rukmini Mehra, Kajal's grandmother
- Maya Alagh as Malti Singhania
- Beena Banerjee as Beena Sahay
- Supriya Karnik as Herself (cameo appearance)

== Production ==
=== Development ===
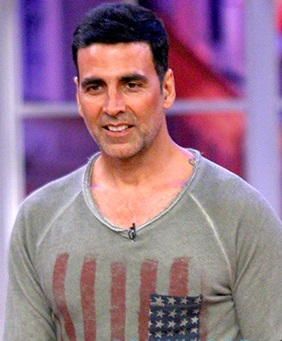
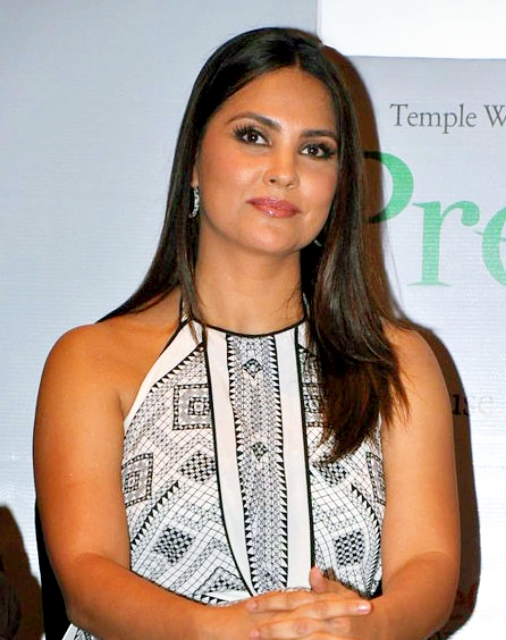
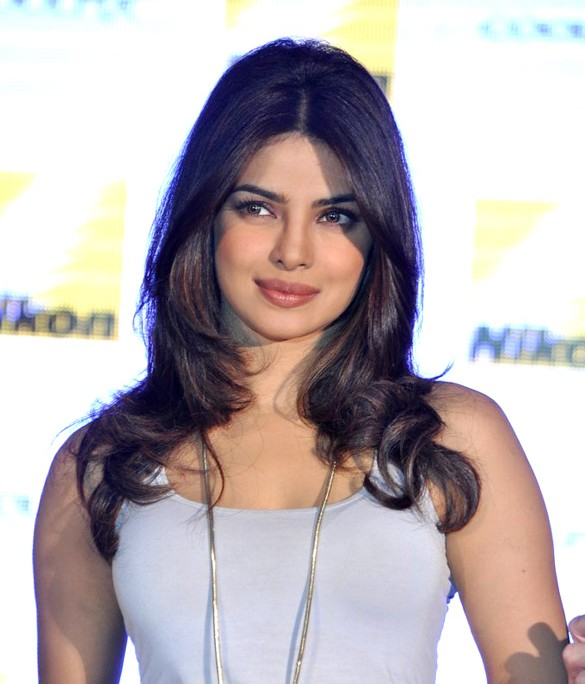
Akshay Kumar, Lara Dutta and Priyanka Chopra were cast in the leading roles

When director Raj Kanwar approached Suneel Darshan with the idea for Andaaz, Darshan liked the concept and agreed to produce the film under his production company Shree Krishna International despite the poor performance of Kanwar's previous three films. Robin Bhatt, Shyam Goel and Jainendra Jain had written the film's screenplay.

=== Casting ===
Darshan cast his frequent actor Akshay Kumar in the lead role and due to budget constraints, Darshan wished to cast two new actresses opposite Kumar. He and Kanwar ultimately decided upon Miss Universe 2000 Lara Dutta and Miss World 2000 Priyanka Chopra as the most suitable actresses for the roles. The casting of the titleholders of such major beauty pageants was seen as an excellent move in the media, and Darshan has said that he chose to cast the two beauty queens together in their film debut for the first time in the history of cinema to give the film a unique selling point. Andaaz was the first of many collaborations between Kumar and the actresses. Dutta would later appear in seven more films with Kumar—Chopra in three.

Kumar had wanted to become an air force pilot in real life, so he was excited to play one in the film saying that it helped him to fulfill a personal fantasy. Concerning his preparations for the role of Raj, he added: "I have done everything according to what the role requires. I have made sure I looked like an air force officer." Dutta praised the writing of her character for being "superbly defined" and said that she had an "amazing experience" working on the film. According to Dutta, her role as the tomboy Kajal revealed a new and very private side of her on screen. To differentiate Kajal from Jiya, the creators chose Mona Ghosh Shetty to dub Kajal's lines, which gave her a very high-pitched voice. Chopra identified closely with her character, saying that "just like her name, [Jiya] is full of beans and loves life. She comes across as very modern, but in her heart, she is a traditional Indian girl." About the film, Chopra said, "There is nothing hatke [different] about it. But it is the way the romantic scenes have been treated, and the tiny details, that make it special." Andaaz was supposed to be Chopra's debut Bollywood film, but her other film, The Hero: Love Story of a Spy, ended up being released one month before it. However, Chopra was still credited as a debutant in the opening credits of Andaaz. Dutta and Chopra's costumes were designed by Manish Malhotra.

=== Filming ===
The art direction and cinematography were led by Jeena Matthew and Ishwar R Bidri, respectively. Principal photography lasted three months, with extensive shooting in Cape Town, South Africa. The South African government provided MiGs and other jets for filming, and the crew were allowed to use footage from a South African air show in the film. Raju Khan choreographed the musical sequences, with the exception of one song which was choreographed by Baba Yadav. While shooting one of the musical sequences on a rocky shore in Cape Town, Kumar and Dutta were pulled under the waves. Kumar rescued Dutta by pulling her ashore. Naresh Sharma composed the background score and editing was done by Sanjay Sankla. According to Kumar, Andaaz's production was completed faster than any of Darshan's previous films.

== Soundtrack ==
Andaaz

Soundtrack album by Nadeem–Shravan
- Released: 9 March 2003
- Genre: Feature film soundtrack
- Length: 45:42
- Language: Hindi
- Label: Shree Krishna Audio
- Producer: Nadeem–Shravan

Nadeem–Shravan chronology
Yeh Dil (2003)	Andaaz (2003)	Qayamat (2003)

Andaaz's soundtrack was composed by the music duo Nadeem–Shravan, with lyrics by Sameer Anjaan. Vocals on the album's eight tracks were performed by Kumar Sanu, Udit Narayan, Alka Yagnik, Sonu Nigam, Sapna Mukherjee, Kailash Kher, Babul Supriyo and Shaan. Released on 26 February 2003 at an event in Mumbai, it was the first album issued by Darshan's record label Shree Krishna Audio.

The film's soundtrack album received positive reviews from music critics. Bollywood Hungama praised it as "a good album, worth a buy!". The review in Glamsham magazine was enthusiastically positive: "On the whole, the soundtrack of Andaaz showcases the marvelous and creative skills of the composer duo, Nadeem-Shravan. No doubt, some of the tracks will win awards in the future. The album has upmarket music. The whole content of the soundtrack is memorable and a gorgeous gift for the people who have an ear for rhythmical music." Planet Bollywood gave it a rating of 7.5 (out of 10) calling it "good" and wrote: "the album has two or three excellent songs and another three good numbers and a couple of ordinary ones. Overall, it's definitely worth a buy especially so for Nadeem-Shravan/Sameer and melody fans. It is better than most of their recent efforts".

The music topped charts on a number of platforms in India. The album was the second best-selling Bollywood soundtrack of the year, with 2.5 million units sold according to Box Office India.

No.	Title	Singer(s)	Length
1.	"Kisi Se Tum Pyar Karo"	Kumar Sanu & Alka Yagnik	5:11
2.	"Kitna Pagal Dil Hai"	Kumar Sanu	5:33
3.	"Allah Kare Dil Na Lage Kisise"	Sonu Nigam & Alka Yagnik	5:27
4.	"Rabba Ishq Na Hove"	Sonu Nigam, Kailash Kher, Alka Yagnik & Sapna Mukherjee	6:23
5.	"Aaj Kehna Zaroori Hai"	Udit Narayan & Alka Yagnik	5:59
6.	"Aayega Maza Ab Barsaat Ka"	Babul Supriyo & Alka Yagnik	5:32
7.	"Kitna Pagal Dil Hai" (Female)	Alka Yagnik	5:32
8.	"Shala La Baby"	Shaan & Alka Yagnik	6:05

== Release ==
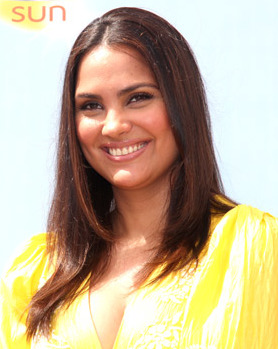
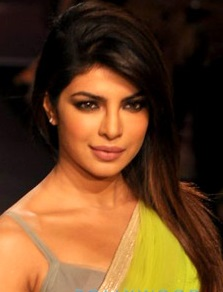
Andaaz's marketing centered around the casting of Miss Universe 2000 Lara Dutta (top) and Miss World 2000 Priyanka Chopra (bottom) together in their debut film

The acting debuts of the former Miss Universe and Miss World, and their pairings with Kumar, were much-anticipated in the lead-up to Andaaz's release. This joint debut of the two beauty queens in a film for the first time was the film's main marketing point. The early success of the film's soundtrack also helped to promote the film, with song clips regularly appearing on television. Darshan reportedly spent ₹10 million on television advertisements to promote the film. Its release was scheduled for 18 April 2003 but was later postponed because of the 2003 Bollywood Producers strike. The film was ultimately released on 23 May 2003 on 300 screens.

Prior to Andaaz, no Bollywood films released in 2003 had achieved much box-office success. Expectations for Andaaz were low, as films with bigger stars were failing to sell. However, the film opened to a huge response at the box-office, with The Times of India reporting on opening week that it "could be the first bona fide all-India hit" of the year. According to Box Office India, the film had an excellent opening; it collected ₹14.4 million on its opening day, with an opening domestic weekend of ₹ 43.9 million. Worldwide, the film grossed ₹ 83.8 million on its opening weekend. Due to overwhelming demand, distributors were forced to ask Darshan for additional prints of the film. The film continued to perform well throughout the week, earning ₹ 69.7 million at domestic box offices, and over ₹ 131 million worldwide, in its first week. In total, the film grossed over ₹ 253 million in domestic sales and over ₹ 35 million in overseas markets for a worldwide gross of over ₹ 288 million against a budget of ₹ 80 million, a commercial success. The film also celebrated a silver jubilee by remaining in theaters for over 100 days. Bollywood Hungama deemed it the "first universal hit of the year". It was the ninth-highest-grossing Indian film of the year.

Andaaz was released on DVD on 1 September 2003 across all regions in an NTSC-format single disc by Tip Top Video. The VCD version was released at the same time. Two more DVD versions were released on 13 September 2005 and 26 January 2007 by Shree Krishna International and Tips Films Music, respectively. A high-definition DVD version, with audio and video digitally restored, was later released by Shemaroo Entertainment. Despite Andaaz's box-office success, as he had with his previous works, Darshan refused to sell the film's television rights. The collective value of his films' unsold satellite rights was estimated to be ₹ 1 billion. Darshan finally sold the rights to his films to Zee in 2017, and Andaaz premiered on Zee Cinema on 9 September 2017, 14 years after its theatrical release. The film's premiere garnered high ratings for the network.

== Reception ==
Hindustan Times rated the film at 3 out of 5, calling it a "brightly wrapped" love triangle, writing that "with two former beauty queens gunning to serve a hotter peekaboo plethora, you can't possibly complain over timepass with Andaaz." Taran Adarsh from Bollywood Hungama noted that the performances of the newcomers, the music, the "engaging" second-half and the "brilliant climax" were the film's highlights. Although he felt that the "predictable" first-half diluted the impact of the film to an extent. Praising the cast, Adarsh felt that the newcomers "stole the show" and Kumar did "justice to his role", writing "Dutta is impressive. She handles both the emotional as well as chirpy scenes with amazing ease. However, Chopra is the one to watch out for. Combining talent with sex appeal, she emotes the various shades of her character with versatility." Kunal Shah of Sify described the film as "a routine love story with a set formula" and "a classic example of old wine in [sic] new bottle". He praised the music, as well as Dutta's and Chopra's performances, writing: "Dutta looks good in some scenes, while looks very plain in others, though no doubt she acts well. However, Chopra is just wonderful: not only does she have the glamour but also all the qualities to be a star." However, he was critical of the formulaic script and Kumar's performance, writing that the actor "lacks the necessary emotions and fails miserably to get any kind of sympathy from the audience." A review in Rediff.com described the film as a "flight to boredom" writing, "Andaaz just forgot a key ingredient for an entertaining film—the script."

== Legacy ==
After the success of Andaaz, the pairing of Chopra and Kumar proved to be popular and successful. The pair appeared in three more films: Mujhse Shaadi Karogi (2004), Aitraaz (2004) and Waqt: The Race Against Time (2005). All of their collaborations were box-office successes. Despite these successes, the pair stopped signing films. The pair came close to star in two films: Barsaat (2005) and Namastey London (2007). However, Kumar opted out of the former after filming some scenes, while Chopra was removed from the latter at the last minute. Following the release of their last film together, several attempts have been made by different filmmakers to bring the pair again in films but the attempts never came to fruition.

Andaaz was one of the early successes of Dutta and Chopra's careers. Dutta went on to have a decent career in Bollywood and became a popular actress. Chopra would go on to become one of the most popular and highest-paid actresses in Bollywood, while establishing herself as a leading actress of Indian cinema. She would later go on to work in Hollywood and achieve international stardom.

== Accolades ==
Award	Date (Note: Linked to the article about the awards held that year, wherever possible.)	Category	Cast nominee(s)	Result	Ref.
Filmfare Awards	20 February 2004				
Filmfare Awards	20 February 2004	Best Film	Andaaz	Nominated	
Filmfare Awards	20 February 2004	Best Actor	Akshay Kumar	Nominated	
Filmfare Awards	20 February 2004	Best Supporting Actress	Priyanka Chopra	Nominated	
Filmfare Awards	20 February 2004	Best Female Debut	Priyanka Chopra	Won	
Filmfare Awards	20 February 2004	Best Female Debut	Lara Dutta	Won	
Filmfare Awards	20 February 2004	Best Lyricist	Sameer (for song "Kisise Tum Pyaar Karo")	Nominated	
Filmfare Awards	20 February 2004	Best Male Playback Singer	Kumar Sanu (for song "Kisise Tum Pyaar Karo")	Nominated	
Screen Awards	16 January 2004	Best Female Debut	Priyanka Chopra	Nominated	
Screen Awards	16 January 2004	Best Female Debut	Lara Dutta	Won	
Zee Cine Awards	26 February 2004	Best Female Debut	Lara Dutta	Nominated	
Zee Cine Awards	26 February 2004	Best Female Debut	Priyanka Chopra (Note: Also for The Hero: Love Story of a Spy.)	Nominated	
Zee Cine Awards	26 February 2004	Best Music Director	Nadeem–Shravan	Nominated	
