= Ajay (1996 film) =

- Theatrical release poster
- Directed by: Suneel Darshan
- Screenplay by: Praful Parekh
- Dialogues by: Kamlesh Pandey; Suneel Darshan
- Story by: Rajeev Kaul; Praful Parekh
- Produced by: Suneel Darshan
- Starring: Sunny Deol; Karisma Kapoor; Suresh Oberoi; Kiran Kumar
- Cinematography: W. B. Rao
- Edited by: Bharat Singh
- Music by: Anand–Milind
- Production company: Shree Krishna International
- Distributed by: Shree Krishna International
- Release date: 20 December 1996
- Running time: 146 min
- Country: India
- Language: Hindi
- Budget: ₹ 6.4 crore
- Box office: ₹16.81 crore (equivalent to ₹210 crore or US$24 million in 2023)

Ajay is a 1996 Hindi language romantic action drama film, directed and produced by Suneel Darshan.

It stars Sunny Deol and Karisma Kapoor as the main leads, along with Reena Roy, Suresh Oberoi, Kiran Kumar, Sadashiv Amrapurkar, Mohnish Bahl, Sharat Saxena, Farida Jalal and Laxmikant Berde.

The film was declared "semi-hit" at the box office.

== Plot ==
Ajay tells the passionate and tumultuous story of Ajay, a dairy and poultry dealer, and Manorama "Rama," the foreign-returned, headstrong niece of powerful, wealthy landlords, Raja Brijraj Singh and his younger brother, Ranbir Singh. The film is set in a small town, Kishengarh.

Initially, Manorama, independent and used to wealth, clashes with the straightforward and noble Ajay. Despite their vastly different social and economic classes, their initial arguments and skirmishes gradually evolve into a deep mutual attraction and, eventually, profound love. Their blossoming romance, however, draws the fierce and violent ire of Manorama's protective and status-conscious uncles.

Brijraj and Ranbir use their power and coercion to try and separate the couple. The uncles ruthlessly threaten Manorama, forcing her into an unthinkable betrayal: she must provide false witness that results in Ajay being thrown into jail. Adding to the tragedy, the false accusation also causes Ajay's sister to be disowned by her in-laws, leading directly to the demise of Ajay's mother from heartbreak.

Upon his release, Ajay, unaware of the extreme duress Manorama was under, is consumed by grief and fury. He blames Manorama entirely for his mother's death and the ruin of his family. He sets out for revenge, but the plot takes a crucial turn when he eventually learns the painful, devastating truth: Manorama was a victim of her uncles' brutality and manipulation, forced to comply under duress.

With the truth revealed, Ajay's hatred shifts entirely to the real culprits: Raja Brijraj Singh and Raja Ranbir Singh. The film then climaxes with a shift to an action-packed quest for justice. Driven by love for Manorama and a burning desire to avenge his family's suffering, Ajay retaliates by killing both of Manorama's villainous uncles, thus bringing the saga of class conflict, betrayal, and intense emotional drama to a violent end.

== Cast ==
- Sunny Deol as Ajay – Manorama's boyfriend
- Karishma Kapoor as Manorama "Rama" – Ajay's girlfriend
- Reena Roy as Durga
- Suresh Oberoi as Raja Brijraj Singh – Manorama's uncle
- Kiran Kumar as Chhote Raja Ranbir Singh – Brijraj's younger brother, Manorama's uncle
- Farida Jalal as Ajay's mother
- Devayani as Anjali – Ajay's younger sister
- Sharat Saxena as Inspector Tippen Singh
- Mohnish Behl as Roopesh Singh
- Laxmikant Berde as Rupaiya – Ajay's friend
- Sadashiv Amrapurkar as Lala – Rupaiya's father
- Dan Dhanoa as Naresh, Roopesh's friend
- Dolly Bindra as Dimple, Manorama's maid

== Music and soundtrack ==
The Music of the film was composed by Anand–Milind and the lyrics of the songs were penned by Sameer. The songs Chamak Chhallo and Chand Sa Chehra were popular. Singers Kumar Sanu, Alka Yagnik, Udit Narayan, Sapna Awasthi and Jolly Mukherjee lent their voices.

#	Title	Singer(s)
1.	"Chaand Sa Chehra"	Kumar Sanu, Alka Yagnik
2.	"Chhammak Chhallo" (Hip Hop)	Kumar Sanu
3.	"Deewana Hua Main"	Kumar Sanu, Alka Yagnik
4.	"Ruk Majnu"	Kumar Sanu, Alka Yagnik
5.	"Pan Khake Jana"	Jolly Mukherjee, Udit Narayan, Alka Yagnik
6.	"Chhammak Chhallo" (Dance)	Kumar Sanu
7.	"Chanchal Chooriyan"	Kumar Sanu, Alka Yagnik
8.	"Banna Ghodi Pe"	Kumar Sanu, Jolly Mukherjee, Alka Yagnik, Sapna Awasthi
9.	"Daata Mere Daata"	Kumar Sanu
