= Zamaana Deewana =

- Theatrical release poster
- Directed by: Ramesh Sippy
- Written by: Robin Bhatt; Javed Siddiqui
- Produced by: G. P. Sippy
- Starring: Shah Rukh Khan; Raveena Tandon; Jeetendra; Shatrughan Sinha; Anupam Kher; Prem Chopra
- Cinematography: K. K. Mahajan
- Edited by: M. S. Shinde
- Music by: Songs: Nadeem–Shravan; Score: Naresh Sharma
- Production company: Sippy Films
- Distributed by: Ramesh Sippy Enterprises; Eros Entertainment
- Release date: 28 July 1995
- Running time: 180 min.
- Country: India
- Language: Hindi
- Budget: ₹4 crore (US$420,000)
- Box office: ₹9.99 crore (US$1.0 million)

Zamaana Deewana is a 1995 Hindi-language masala film, produced by G. P. Sippy under the Sippy Films banner and directed by Ramesh Sippy. It stars Shahrukh Khan, Raveena Tandon in pivotal roles, along with Jeetendra, Shatrughan Sinha playing their parents, respectively. The music was composed by Nadeem-Shravan. The film under-performed at the box office.

== Plot ==
Suraj (Shatrughan Sinha) and Lala (Jeetendra) were good friends before falling prey to the vicious tricks of Sundar (Tinnu Anand), so much so that Lala believes his wife is dead and Suraj is to blame for that. They become the greatest of enemies and create chaos in the city by way of gang wars. Asst. Commissioner of Police (Prem Chopra) has 2 criminal psychologists, KD (Anupam Kher) and Shalini (Kiran Juneja) weave a plot to bring Rahul (Shahrukh Khan), the lively and spirited son of Suraj, close to Priya (Raveena Tandon), the ever-so-graceful and elegant daughter of Lala, hoping to bring the two sides together.

== Cast ==
- Jeetendra as Madanlal Malhotra
- Shatrughan Sinha as Suraj Pratap Singh
- Shahrukh Khan as Rahul Singh
- Raveena Tandon as Priya Malhotra
- Anupam Kher as Kamdev Singh "K.D."
- Prem Chopra as Assistant Commissioner of Police
- Tinnu Anand as Sundar
- Kiran Juneja as Shalini Shrivastav
- Neelima Azeem as Nisha
- Beena Banerjee as Sarita Malhotra
- Aasif Sheikh as Bobby
- Sudhir as Gullu
- Ghanshyam Rohera as Sai-Landowner
- Sheeba as O Rabba

== Soundtrack ==
The music of the film was composed by Nadeem-Shravan, while lyrics were written by Sameer. Most popular songs in album "Neend Kise Chain Kahan", & "O Rabba".

=== Track listing ===
No.	Title	Lyrics	Singer(s)	Length
1.	"Zamaana Deewana Ho Gaya"	Sameer	Vinod Rathod & Sapna Mukherjee	6:54
2.	"Neend Kise Chain Kahan"	Sameer	Kumar Sanu & Alka Yagnik	6:46
3.	"For Ever 'N' Ever"	Sameer	Kumar Sanu & Alka Yagnik	6:47
4.	"O Rabba"	Sameer	Udit Narayan & Sapna Awasthi	8:07
5.	"Zamaane Ko Ab Tak Nahi"	Sameer	Abhijeet Bhattacharya & Alka Yagnik	5:56
6.	"Soch Liya Maine Aye Mere Dilbar"	Sameer	Vinod Rathod & Alka Yagnik	6:52
7.	"For Ever 'N' Ever" (Sad)	Sameer	Kumar Sanu & Alka Yagnik	2:18
8.	"Rok Sake To Rok"	Sameer	Vinod Rathod	5:55
9.	"Parody"	Sameer	Alisha Chinai & Bali Brahmabhatt	6:05
