= Saali Poori Gharwali =

Saali Poori Gharawali is a Hindi landmark B grade comedy Drama film directed and produced by Yogendra Konkar. This film was released on 10 November 2000 under the banner of Sharayu Arts.

== Plot ==
Young Kamesh is an unhappy man lives with his wife Kanchan. Kanchan is less interested about their sexual life and always busy in useless rituals. One day Kanchan's sister Kamini comes their home. She is attractive and jovial. Frustrated Kamesh falls in love with his Saali (Sister-in-law). As a result, Kanchan realises that their conjugal relationship should be more strong.

== Cast ==
- Satish Shah
- Dolly Bindra
- Yogendra Konkar
- Hitesh Sampat
- Mahesh Kawal
- Ajay Shah
- Jay Devi
