= Dolly Bindra =

Indian actress

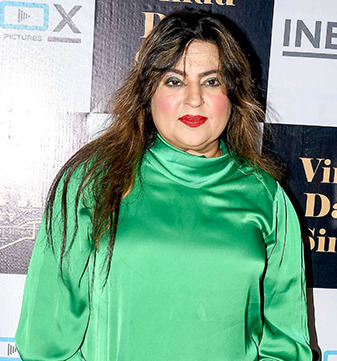
- Bindra in May 2019.
- Born: 20 January 1970 (age 56); Mumbai, Maharastra, India
- Occupations: Comedian and Entertainer
- Years active: 1996–present

Dolly Bindra (born 20 January 1970) is an Indian actress, known for her participation, assertive and confrontational behaviour in the reality TV series, Bigg Boss 4 in 2010.

== Career ==
Bindra started working in Bollywood when she was 18 years old. Bindra has done roles in Hum Sab Ek Hai later in movies like Gadar, and many other stage shows. Her recently released films include Tara Rum Pum, Mummji, Dhan Dhana Dhan Goal and Krazzy 4.

Bindra was a participant in the fourth season of reality TV show Bigg Boss.

== Controversy ==
Dolly Bindra who was once a devotee of Radhe Maa. Later she filed an FIR against her, claiming sexual abuse. She was known for outspoken and confrontational behavior in Bigg Boss.

== Filmography ==
=== Films ===
Year	Film/Music video	Character	Notes
2025	Andaaz 2		
2023	Gadar 2	Samira Khan	
2019	Dabangg 3	Chinti Walia	
2018	"Knightridah"	Dancer	Special Appearance in Imran Khan's music video for the song
2017	Yeh Hai Bigg Boss	Patli Dolly Bindra	
2015	Dolly Ki Doli		Special Appearance
2009	Ajab Prem Ki Ghazab Kahani	Mrs. Pitambar Jalan	
2009	Chal Chala Chal	Cameo	
2007	Goal	teacher	Debut in Malayalam Films
2007	Ta Ra Rum Pum	Mrs. Panoya	
2006	Fight Club – Members Only		
2005	Dosti: Friends Forever		
2005	A Sublime Love Story: Barsaat	Shammi's Wife	
2005	Maine Pyaar Kyun Kiya	Naina's friend	
2005	Jo Bole So Nihaal	Nihal's sister	
2004	Madhoshi		
2003	Talaash: The Hunt Begins...		
2002	Haan Maine Bhi Pyaar Kiya		
2002	Yeh Mohabbat Hai	Jyoti	
2001	Style	Chantu's Mother	
2001	Yaadein...	Sania's mother-in-law	
2001	Gadar: Ek Prem Katha	Gul Khan's wife	
2001	Censor	Madhu (Shiv Prasad's girlfriend)	
2000	Khiladi 420		
2000	Bichhoo		
2000	Saali Poori Gharwali		
2000	Glamour Girl	Dolly	
1999	Jaanwar	Sapna's friend	
1999	Pyaar Koi Khel Nahin		
1996	Ajay		
1996	Khiladiyon Ka Khiladi	Bhagwanti	

=== Television ===
Year	Name	Role	Channel	Notes	Ref
2010-2011	Bigg Boss 4	Contestant	Colors TV	Finalist/3rd Runner-Up	
2014-2014	Adaalat	Sweety Manchanda	Sony TV	Episode 85	
