= Inteqam =

Inteqaam
- Theatrical release poster
- Directed by: Rajkumar Kohli
- Screenplay by: Lalit Mahajan
- Story by: Laxmikant Sharma
- Produced by: Suneel Darshan
- Starring: Sunny Deol; Anil Kapoor; Meenakshi Sheshadri; Kimi Katkar; Ashok Kumar; Prem Chopra; Kader Khan; Shakti Kapoor
- Cinematography: Thomas Xavier
- Edited by: Waman Rao
- Music by: Laxmikant–Pyarelal
- Production company: Shree Krishna International
- Release date: 11 November 1988
- Country: India
- Language: Hindi

Intaqaam (transl. "Revenge") is an Indian action film directed by Rajkumar Kohli and released in 1988. It stars Sunny Deol, Anil Kapoor, Meenakshi Sheshadri and Kimi Katkar in lead roles.

== Plot ==
The life of Birju is turned upside down when his sister Chhaya is raped and the unscrupulous defence attorney Dinanath concocts a false case to malign her. This causes their father to suffer a massive heart attack and die right in the court. Their mother also dies right there from the shock. Ashamed and devastated, Chhaya runs out of the court in grief and is hit by a passing truck and dies in Birju's arms.

Filled with vengeance and hatred, Birju decides to take “Inteqam” (revenge) on Dinanath and his family. He goes to Dinanath's house, cuts off his tongue and kidnaps his sister Sita, on her marriage day. He then hands her over to a Madam, Zohra Bai, so that she is condemned to a life of a tawaif. Birju then proceeds to find Dinanath's younger brother, Vikram, as his next target.

Meanwhile, Vikram, who works as a taxi driver, searches the city desperately for his sister and her kidnapper. One night he helps Birju in fight with some local goons, not knowing his real identity. Birju introduces himself as Vijay, a name that he has adopted in order to evade the police, while Vikram introduces himself as Vicky. Both become inseparable friends without knowing that they are searching for each other.

While living with Vikram, Birju meets Chandni, who is the spitting image of Chhaya. He thus adopts her as his own sister. He later saves Sita, now known as Sitara, from a man named Narayan. Eventually, Sita and Birju develop feelings for each other. Just as Birju plans to marry Sita, Narayan learns the true identities of Birju and Vicky. He reveals the truth to Sita, who now wants to kill Birju. When Sita attempts to stab Birju during the wedding of Vikram and Chandni, Vikram comes to know about her ordeal. This shatters the friendship between Birju and Vikram. Just as a violent confrontation is brewing between them, Dinanath intervanes. He admits his guilt and reveals his misdeeds which forced Birju to take revenge.

Narayan uses this opportunity to abduct Sita and Chandni. Birju and Vikram eventually decide to set aside their differences for good and go after Narayan to rescue Sita and Chandni. During the ensuing brawl, Vikram's brother Dinanath sacrifices his own life to help Birju, thus atoning for his sins. Narayan is arrested by the Police.

The story ends on a happy note with Birju marrying an elated Sita.

== Cast ==
- Sunny Deol as Birju / Vijay
- Anil Kapoor as Vikram / Vicky
- Meenakshi Sheshadri as Sita / Sitara – Vikram’s younger sister, eventually Birju’s wife.
- Kimi Katkar in a dual role as
  - Chhaya – Birju’s sister
  - Chandni – Vikram’s girlfriend, later wife
- Ashok Kumar as Raghuveer – Birju’s father
- Nirupa Roy as Raghuveer's wife – Birju’s mother
- Prem Chopra as Advocate Dinanath – Vikram and Sita’s elder brother
- Kader Khan as Narayan
- Shakti Kapoor as Jacob
- Amjad Khan as Murli
- Rajendra Nath as Chachu
- Aruna Irani as Zohra Bai
- Dalip Tahil as Balwant

== Music and soundtrack ==
Laxmikant–Pyarelal composed the music and Anand Bakshi penned the lyrics of the songs.

1. "Bhai Kiska Hai Iska Hai" - Kavita Krishnamurthy, Mohammed Aziz, Nitin Mukesh
2. "Jaise Ik Chaand Ka Tukadaa" - Kavita Krishnamurthy, Mohammed Aziz, Nitin Mukesh
3. "Mujhe Uss Sitamagar Kee Surat Dikha Do" - Kavita Krishnamurthy
4. "Ab Main Naachoongi" - Kavita Krishnamurthy
5. "Main Jawaan Ho Gayee" - Mohammed Aziz, Anuradha Paudwal
