= Hoshiyar... Sahi Waqt, Sahi Kadam =

- Genre: Crime reality television
- Created by: Vipul D. Shah
- Presented by: Mohnish Bahl
- Country of origin: India
- Original language: Hindi
- No. of seasons: 1
- No. of episodes: 47

Production
- Producer: Vipul D. Shah
- Production locations: Mumbai, India
- Camera setup: Multi-camera
- Production company: Optimystix Entertainment

Original release
- Network: &TV
- Release: 24 December 2016 – 4 June 2017

Hoshiyar... Sahi Waqt, Sahi Kadam is an Indian Hindi crime reality television anthology series, which was aired on 24 December 2016 and broadcast on &TV. The series was produced by Optimystix Entertainment of Vipul D. Shah. The series was aired on the nights of the weekend. The series was hosted by Mohnish Bahl.

== Host ==
- Mohnish Bahl (2016–2017)

== Cast ==
- Keval Vora as Punit(episode 17)
- Akshay Batchu as Arnub(episode 17)
- Jai Thakker as Deepak(episode 17)
- Bhavin Bhanushali (episode 16)
