= Raja Hindustani =

1996 Indian film by Dharmesh Darshan

- Film poster
- Directed by: Dharmesh Darshan
- Written by: Dharmesh Darshan; Javed Siddiqui (dialogues)
- Screenplay by: Robin Bhatt
- Story by: Dharmesh Darshan
- Produced by: Ali Morani; Karim Morani; Bunty Soorma
- Starring: Aamir Khan; Karisma Kapoor
- Cinematography: W.B. Rao
- Edited by: Bharat Singh
- Music by: Songs: Nadeem-Shravan; Background score: Surinder Sodhi
- Production company: Cineyug Films
- Distributed by: Tips Industries; Eros International
- Release date: 15 November 1996
- Running time: 177 minutes
- Country: India
- Language: Hindi
- Budget: ₹5.75 crore
- Box office: ₹76.34 crore (US$21.55 million)

Raja Hindustani (transl. Indian Raja) is a 1996 Indian Hindi-language romantic action film directed by Dharmesh Darshan. It tells the story of a cab driver from a small town who falls in love with a rich young woman. Aamir Khan and Karisma Kapoor play the lead roles. Released on 15 November 1996, the film's plot was inspired from the 1965 film Jab Jab Phool Khile, starring Shashi Kapoor and Nanda. The film's music was composed by Nadeem-Shravan, with lyrics by Sameer. It went on to win five Filmfare Awards, including the awards for Best Film, Best Actors, Best Music and seven Screen Awards.

Raja Hindustani was the third most commercially successful Hindi film of the 1990s in terms of net gross. Made on a budget of ₹5.75 crore, the film went on to gross ₹76.34 crore worldwide, becoming the highest-grossing film of the year, and the fourth highest-grossing film in India of the 1990s behind Hum Aapke Hain Koun..!, Dilwale Dulhania Le Jayenge and Kuch Kuch Hota Hai. Karisma Kapoor was complimented for her looks and performance as Aarti: a rich, beautiful, sensitive, young woman full of dreams and desires. It is Kapoor's biggest commercial success till date and is regarded as one of her best performances; it was a major turning point in her career. She won the Filmfare Best Actress Award for her role. The chemistry between the lead pair of Aamir Khan and Karisma Kapoor was praised and there was a much talked-about kissing scene. The film was remade in Kannada as Naanu Naane in 2002, starring Upendra and Sakshi Shivanand in lead roles and was later dubbed in Telugu as Prema Bandham.

== Plot ==
Aarti Sehgal is a beautiful young girl. Her stepmother Shalini wants to gain her father Bakshrath's wealth. Aarti arrives in Palankhet for a vacation to discover memories of her late mother and hires the services of available driver, Raja Hindustani. Ultimately, they bond and fall in love after an accidental passionate romantic kiss. Bakshrath arrives to take Aarti back to Mumbai and rejects Raja as his son-in-law, but they disobey him and marry. He later accepts their love, bringing them to Mumbai.

To gain total control of Bakshrath's assets, Shalini sets a trap that causes Raja and Aarti to get separated. Upon knowing her pregnancy, Aarti decides to inform and reunite with Raja. The doctor advises her not to travel. Shalini is asked to reach Palankhet to inform and convince Raja to come back to Mumbai. However, she misleads him that Aarti wants to divorce him, and then Aarti that Raja now hates her. Thus they get stuck in misunderstandings and separate.

6 months later, Aarti gives birth to a son, whom she dearly loves. Raja later gets to know that she has his child and is under the impression she intends to keep him away from it. Fearing he can never see his son, Raja kidnaps him. The lies and deception of Shalini come out. Distraught, Aarti reveals the truth to Raja, and they unite.

== Cast ==
- Aamir Khan as Raja Hindustani
- Karishma Kapoor as Aarti Sehgal
- Suresh Oberoi as Bakshrath Sehgal
- Archana Puran Singh as Shalini "Shalu" Mitra
- Tiku Talsania as Sanjeev Sharma
- Farida Jalal as Suhasini Sharma
- Johnny Lever as Balwant Singh
- Pramod Moutho as Swaraj Mitra
- Mohnish Behl as Jay Mitra
- Navneet Nishan as Kamal "Kammo" Singh
- Veeru Krishnan as Gulaab Singh
- Master Kunal Khemu as Rajnikant
- Razak Khan as Taxi Driver
- Kalpana Iyer in song "Pardesi Pardesi"
- Pratibha Sinha in song "Pardesi Pardesi"

== Production ==
Manisha Koirala was first offered the lead actress role, but she refused. Shah Rukh Khan was also considered for the lead actor role, but it was offered to Aamir Khan who had problems signing in for the role. Juhi Chawla and Aishwarya Rai were also among those actresses who were considered for the role. Palankhet was a fictional location created for the film, and is a portmanteau of two real hill stations' names: Palampur and Ranikhet.

== Soundtrack ==
Raja Hindustani/Prema Bandham

Studio album by Nadeem Shravan
- Released: 1996
- Genre: Feature film soundtrack
- Length: 51:20
- Label: Tips
- Producer: Nadeem Shravan

Nadeem Shravan chronology
Jeet (1996)	Raja Hindustani/Prema Bandham (1996)	Himmatvar (1996)

The soundtrack was composed by Nadeem-Shravan. Planet Bollywood ranks the film's soundtrack at 56 in its all-time top 100 greatest Bollywood soundtracks.

It consisted of tracks like "Kitna Pyara Tujhe Rab Ne" (which is uncredited and unofficial translation of the Punjabi song "Kinna Sohna Tenu Rab Ne Banaya" by Nusrat Fateh Ali Khan), "Aaye Ho Meri Zindagi Mein", which had become an immensely popular wedding song, and Sapna Awasthi, Udit Narayan and Alka Yagnik's "Pardesi Pardesi", which was a major chartbuster at the time and which also led to the film's success. Udit Narayan won his 3rd Filmfare Award for Best Male Playback Singer for this song. The album became the best-selling Bollywood soundtrack of the year by a wide margin.

Aniket Joshi of Planet Bollywood gave the album a rating of 9.5 out of 10 stating, "Raja Hindustani is a must for lovers of good ever lasting melody." The soundtrack album sold 11 million copies and is one of the best-selling Bollywood soundtrack albums of all time. It was the third best selling album of the 1990s after Aashiqui (1990) and Dil To Pagal Hai (1997).

Alka Yagnik considers "Poochho Zara Poocho" as one of the best songs she ever rendered. The song has been copied by many a composer since. Anand-Milind lifted the tune in the "Tumse Dil Lagane Ki Sazaa Hai" part of the song and used it in the song "Mausam Ki Tarah Tum Bhi Badal To Na Jaaoge" from Jaanwar (1999). Both songs were picturized on Karisma Kapoor and had in common, singer and lyricist: Alka Yagnik and Sameer. The director of the later movie is Suneel Darshan, who is an elder sibling to Dharmesh Darshan.

Again, the same portion of the song was used by Himesh Reshammiya in the "Tujhe Apna Dil Dene Ka Hai Mazaa" part of the song "Pyaar Kar" from the film Humraaz (2002).

One of the riffs used in the background score of the film was later on used by Nadeem-Shravan in the chorus of the song "Tum Dil Ki Dhadkan Mein", from the film Dhadkan (2000). Dhadkan was also directed by Dharmesh Darshan, with the movie's soundtrack composed by Nadeem-Shravan, and lyrics written by Sameer.

The song, "Saala Main To Sahab Ban Gaya", from the 1974 film Sagina, was briefly used in the movie. The song was picturised on Aamir Khan. In Sagina, the song was filmed on Dilip Kumar and sung by Kishore Kumar. In this film, Kishore Kumar's original vocals were retained.

=== Track list ===
No.	Title	Singer(s)	Length
1.	"Pucho Zara Pucho"	Kumar Sanu, Alka Yagnik	06:12
2.	"Aaye Ho Meri Zindagi Mein (Male) (Yaman Kalyan)"	Udit Narayan	06:03
3.	"Aaye Ho Meri Zindagi Mein (Female) (Yaman Kalyan)"	Alka Yagnik	06:03
4.	"Kitna Pyaare Tujhe Rabne (Shivaranjani)"	Udit Narayan, Alka Yagnik	06:22
5.	"Pardesi Pardesi (Part 1) (Pahadi)"	Udit Narayan, Alka Yagnik, Sapna Awasthi	07:28
6.	"Pardesi Pardesi (Part 2) (Pahadi)"	Kumar Sanu, Alka Yagnik	08:20
7.	"Tere Ishq Mein Nachenge"	Kumar Sanu, Alisha Chinai, Sapna Mukherjee	08:14
8.	"Pardesi Pardesi (Sad) (Pahadi)"	Suresh Wadkar, Bela Sulakhe	02:40
Total length:			51:22

== Reception ==
=== Critical response ===
Film critic Anupama Chopra, while reviewing Raja Hindustani for India Today wrote, "the film is disappointingly dated, but Darshan scores with his music-catchy 'Pardesi, Pardesi'— and with his leading lady, Karisma." She went on to praise Kapoor's performance saying, "Karisma looks stunning and acts surprisingly well. She is the lifeblood of this otherwise-banal film."

=== Box office ===
Raja Hindustani earned ₹76.34 crore worldwide, including a domestic gross of ₹73.84 crore. Its domestic nett was ₹43.15 crore, and its adjusted worldwide gross is equivalent to ₹394 crore.

Box Office India declared it an "All-Time Blockbuster". Domestically, it was the fourth highest-grossing film of the 1990s, after Hum Aapke Hain Koun (1994) (₹116 crore), Dilwale Dulhaniya Le Jayenge (1995) (₹86.49 crore) and Kuch Kuch Hota Hai (1998) (₹80.12 crore). Adjusted for inflation, Raja Hindustani is the fifth highest-grossing film of India since the 1990s.

== Awards ==
Award	Category	Nominee	Result
42nd Filmfare Awards	Best Film	Cineyug	Won
42nd Filmfare Awards	Best Actor	Aamir Khan	Won
42nd Filmfare Awards	Best Actress	Karisma Kapoor	Won
42nd Filmfare Awards	Best Music Director	Nadeem-Shravan	Won
42nd Filmfare Awards	Best Male Playback Singer	Udit Narayan for "Pardesi Pardesi"	Won
42nd Filmfare Awards	Best Director	Dharmesh Darshan	Nominated
42nd Filmfare Awards	Best Supporting Actress	Archana Puran Singh	Nominated
42nd Filmfare Awards	Best Performance in a Comic Role	Johnny Lever	Nominated
42nd Filmfare Awards	Best Performance in a Comic Role	Navneet Nishan	Nominated
42nd Filmfare Awards	Best Lyricist	Sameer for "Pardesi Pardesi"	Nominated
42nd Filmfare Awards	Best Female Playback Singer	Alka Yagnik for "Pardesi Pardesi"	Nominated
1997 Screen Awards	Best Film	Cineyug	Won
1997 Screen Awards	Best Director	Dharmesh Darshan	Won
1997 Screen Awards	Best Actor	Aamir Khan	Won
1997 Screen Awards	Best Comedian	Johnny Lever	Won
1997 Screen Awards	Best Music Director	Nadeem-Shravan	Won
1997 Screen Awards	Best Male Playback Singer	Udit Narayan for "Aaye Ho Meri Zindagi Mein"	Won
1997 Screen Awards	Best Screenplay	Robin Bhatt	Won

== See also ==
- List of highest-grossing Indian films
