= Jeetu Verma =

Indian actor (born 1967)

- Born: Jitendra Badriprasad Verma; 1967 (age 58–59)
- Occupation: Actor
- Years active: 1996 – present

Jitendra Badriprasad Verma (born 1967), better known as Jeetu Verma, is an Indian actor known for his supporting roles in Hindi cinema. He is best known for the role of Jojo in the 1998 film Soldier, his other notable appearances include Humraaz (2002) and Taarzan: The Wonder Car (2004) both also as Jojo, The Fall (2006), Bodyguard (2011), Bol Bachchan (2012) and Son of Sardaar (2012). In 2020, he appeared in the Amazon Prime Mirzapur. As part of the ensemble cast of Bol Bachchan he was nominated for the People's Choice Award for Favourite Ensemble Cast and the Screen Award for Best Ensemble Cast.

His father Badriprasad Jaidev Verma was a stunt man in 1960s and 70s Hindi films and was a horse trainer for films such as Sholay (1975). His brothers Mahendra and Manohar Verma are action choreographers, while his brothers Tinnu and Pappu Verma are stuntmen.

Verma was seriously injured by stone pelters near Chittorgarh, Rajasthan amid production controversies in the state during the shooting of Padmavaat (2018).

== Filmography ==
- The Maharaja's Daughter (1994, TV series)
- Sapoot (1996) as Manik
- Auzaar (1997) as Jai Thakur
- Bade Miyan Chote Miyan (1998) as Zoravar's henchman
- Soldier (1998) as Jojo
- Arjun Pandit (1999) as Haldiram's henchman
- China Gate (1998) as Jageera's brother
- Jaanwar (1999) as Sapna's uncle
- Rajakumarudu (1999, Telugu film)
- Badal (2000) as Rafiq, terrorist
- Kunwara (2000) as Prithvi Thakur's henchman
- Deewaanapan (2001)
- Moksha (2001)
- Karz: The Burden of Truth (2002)
- Kranti (2002) as running man in traffic
- Humraaz (2002) as Jojo Fernandes
- Maa Tujhhe Salaam (2002) as Sajid
- Khushi (2003)
- Talaash: The Hunt Begins...(2003) as Junior, Black John's brother
- Taarzan: The Wonder Car (2004) as Jojo D'Costa
- Deewana Main Deewana (2005) as Police Officer
- Kisna: The Warrior Poet (2005)
- The Fall (2006) as Indian/orange picker
- Shaadi Karke Phas Gaya Yaar (2006)
- Jahan Jaaeyega Hamen Paaeyega (2007) as Makrana
- Ishaara (2008)
- Kisse Pyaar Karoon? (2009)
- Shadow (2009)
- Team: The Force (2009)
- Golmaal 3 (2010) as an antagonist
- No Problem (2010) as Marcos' goon
- Sheetalbhabi.com (2010) as Vishal (special appearance)
- Bodyguard (2011)
- Don Ke Baad Kaun (2011)
- Double Dhamaal (2011)
- Bol Bachchan (2012) as Vikrant Raghuvanshi
- Son of Sardaar (2012)
- Zanjeer (2013)
- Jai Ho (2014)
- Action Jackson (2014) as Chotu
- Kis Kisko Pyaar Karoon (2015)
- Rangoon (2017)
- Raabta (2017)
- Mirzapur (2020, TV series) as Stained-teeth Goon in the episodes "Khargosh" (#2) and "Viklaang Quota" (#3) of season 2
- Andaaz 2 (2025) as Yeda Anna
- Welcome to the Jungle (2026)
