= Jaanwar (1999 film) =

1999 Indian film by Suneel Darshan

- Theatrical release poster
- Directed by: Suneel Darshan
- Written by: Robin Bhatt; K.K. Singh
- Produced by: Suneel Darshan
- Starring: Akshay Kumar; Karisma Kapoor; Shilpa Shetty; Mohnish Bahl; Shakti Kapoor; Ashish Vidyarthi; Ashutosh Rana
- Cinematography: Sameer Reddy
- Edited by: Sanjay Sankla
- Music by: Anand–Milind
- Production company: Shree Krishna International
- Distributed by: Shemaroo Entertainment
- Release date: 24 December 1999
- Running time: 161 minutes
- Country: India
- Language: Hindi
- Budget: ₹45 million
- Box office: ₹124 million

Jaanwar (transl. Animal) is an Indian Hindi-language action thriller film directed and produced by Suneel Darshan from a story written by Robin Bhatt and K.K. Singh. The film stars Akshay Kumar, Karisma Kapoor, and Shilpa Shetty in the lead roles.

Jaanwar was released on 24 December 1999 and received mixed reviews from critics, where it became the 13th highest-grossing Hindi film of the year.

The movie has been described as a "rip-off" of Clint Eastwood's A Perfect World (1993), about an escaped convict who takes a boy as hostage but eventually develops affection for him. Film critic Sukanya Verma talked of "obvious influence."

== Plot ==
Orphaned when his mother dies of starvation, Babu is taken in by Sultan, an ambitious local criminal. Sultan has gathered a group of boys, led by his nephew Abdul, who he trains to work for him. Babu grows up to become "Badshah (Akshay Kumar), a professional criminal working for Sultan. After having robbed a jewellery store, Badshah and Abdul are chased by the police but manage to escape. The next day, Badshah sees Sapna (Karisma Kapoor), a poor street performer, singing and dancing for money. Badshah gives her a large amount of money in order to replace her ripped and old clothes, and Sapna becomes interested in him. Returning home, Badshah finds Inspector Pradhan waiting for him, and the two threaten each other, engaging in a war of words ending with the Inspector vowing to put an end to Badshah's criminal activities. During a weapons exchange, Badshah and Abdul are intercepted by police, and a chase ensues. Badshah is shot in the arm, and the chaos causes both their vehicles to crash. Inspector Pradhan becomes trapped in his car, and Badshah helps him get out. Despite having been saved, the Inspector tries to arrest Badshah, who manages to escape but is badly injured.

Abdul leaves Badshah and goes to get help. Sapna finds Badshah and takes him to her home, looking after him as he recovers. Abdul visits Badshah and updates him about the heightened police presence in the city, advising him to remain with Sapna temporarily. Sapna runs out of money and is manipulated by her greedy uncle, who tells her that he has arranged a loan for her. Instead, she finds that her uncle has sold her for a bottle of liquor to a man, who attempts to rape her. Badshah arrives in time to save her and states that destiny has brought them together. Badshah confesses his criminal life to Sapna and says that he is willing to leave the city and his past behind in order to marry her and live peacefully, but he intends to do one more job so that they will have enough money for the future. After having made a deal with an undercover police informant, Abdul is arrested, and Badshah is cornered on a building rooftop, but he escapes. Meanwhile, Sapna's uncle humiliates her, questioning the relationship between her and Badshah. Badshah publicly declares his feelings for Sapna and announces that they will be married the next day.

While heading to the temple, Badshah comes across the police informant who caused Abdul's arrest. In a fit of rage, he kills him and flees when the police arrive. Sapna, having been stood up at her own wedding, is mocked by her community. Later that night, Badshah finds a child who has survived a train crash, and goes to Sapna for help. Sapna mistakenly believes that Badshah is a married man and has brought his own son to her. Sapna's uncle calls the police, and Badshah escapes with the child, without explaining the truth to Sapna. Meanwhile, the child's distraught parents, Aditya and Mamta, struggle to deal with their son's disappearance. Badshah attempts to leave the boy at a mosque, but later decides to adopt him. Months pass by, and Abdul still refuses to cooperate with the police. Inspector Pradhan refuses to close Badshah's file, promising that he will neither accept any promotions nor transfers until he is caught. Badshah leaves his criminal life behind and starts a new, honest life as Babu Lohar. Babu works hard to earn money to provide for the boy, whom he names Raju and raises as his own.

Seven years later, Raju has grown up and starts to attend school. Mamta, who is the school's trustee, meets Raju and bonds with him, not realising that he is her son. She showers him with gifts, which angers Babu, as he feels that his son is being enticed away from him with material things. Abdul is released from prison and goes home to Sultan, who assumed that Badshah was imprisoned as well. Abdul concludes that Badshah had stolen the money from the deal and abandoned him in jail. Sultan calls for revenge and wants Badshah to return to work for him. Abdul tracks down Sapna, who now works as a bar dancer in a nightclub, and finds out that she does not know where Badshah is either. Soon, Abdul finds out about Badshah's new identity and confronts him about the money and his disappearance. Babu meets Sultan and tells him to forget his past and leave him alone, but Sultan refuses. Having followed Abdul, Inspector Pradhan arrives at Babu's house and meets Raju. He is impressed with the character of the young boy and decides not to pursue Babu anymore. After a school concert, Aditya gives Raju a lift home and comes across his childhood pictures, causing him to realise that Raju is his son. He invites Babu to his home and pleads for the return of his son, but Babu cannot bear to be separated from Raju and refuses. Abdul tries to persuade Sapna to kill Badshah to avenge her humiliation, but she is unable to do so after she overhears Mamta pleading with Babu to return her son. Desperate for the return of his son, Aditya takes Babu to court and wins the right to have Raju in his and Mamta's full custody. Realising that their son is unhappy with his new life, Aditya and Mamta take Raju to visit Babu, but he is kidnapped by Sultan's men during the trip.

Babu goes to save Raju, but is outnumbered and trapped in a cage. Sultan intends to torture Babu by hurting Raju, using his two dogs. Babu manages to free himself and saves Raju from the dogs, killing Abdul and Sultan in the process. Babu reunites with Sapna, and they decide to live with Aditya and Mamta in order to collectively raise Raju.

== Cast ==
- Akshay Kumar as Badshah aka Babu Lohar, Sultan's adoptive son, Raju's adoptive father
- Karisma Kapoor as Sapna, Badshah's love interest
- Aditya Kapadia as Yuvraj Aditya Oberoi aka Raju, son of Mamta and Aditya, adopted by Badshah
- Shilpa Shetty as Mamta Oberoi
- Mohnish Bahl as Aditya Oberoi
- Ashutosh Rana as Abdul
- Ashish Vidyarthi as Inspector Arjun Pradhan
- Johnny Lever as Bajrangi, Badshah's friend
- Shakti Kapoor as Sultan, Badshah's adoptive father
- Jeetu Verma as Sultan's Goon
- Kader Khan as Special Appearance
- Rami Reddy as Police Informer
- Dolly Bindra as Sapna's friend
- Malay Chakrabarty as Sapna's Mama
- Kumar Hegde as Avinash Oberoi, Aditya's younger brother and Raju's uncle
- Indira Krishnan as Rajni Oberoi, Avinash's wife and Raju's aunt

== Soundtrack ==
Jaanwar

Soundtrack album by Anand–Milind
- Released: 10 November 1999
- Genre: Feature film soundtrack
- Label: Venus Records & Tapes

The music was composed by Anand–Milind. Anand–Milind had previously worked with producer Suneel Darshan in Lootere and Ajay. Darshan never worked with them after this film but went on and signed Nadeem–Shravan, Sanjeev–Darshan, and Himesh Reshamiya for his future projects. The music featured in the best-selling albums of 1999.

#	Title	Singer(s)
1	"Mere Sapno Ke Rajkumar"	Alka Yagnik
2	"Mera Yaar Dildaar"	Sukhwinder Singh, Sonu Nigam, Jaspinder Narula, Alka Yagnik
3	"Tujko Na Dekhun"	Udit Narayan, Sunidhi Chauhan
4	"Angoori Angoori"	Sapna Awasthi
5	"Kasam Se"	Udit Narayan, Alka Yagnik
6	"Paas Bulati Hai"	Alka Yagnik, Sunidhi Chauhan
7	"Jaanewale O Jaanewale"	Ram Shankar, Sonu Nigam, Alka Yagnik
8	"Mausam Ki Tarah"	Manhar Udhas, Alka Yagnik
9	"Rishta Dilon Ka"	Sunidhi Chauhan

== Release and reception ==
Sukanya Verma of Rediff.com called it a "mindless affair". The film became a commercial success at box-office.

Jaanwar was released on DVD on 2000 across all regions in an NTSC-format single disc by Tip Top Video. A high-definition DVD version, with audio and video digitally restored, was later released by Shemaroo Entertainment. Even after Jaanwar's box office success, as he had with his previous works, Darshan refused to sell the film's television rights. The collective value of his films' unsold satellite rights was estimated to be ₹ 1 billion. Darshan finally sold the rights to his films to Zee in 2017, and Jaanwar premiered on Zee Cinema on 2 September 2017, 18 years after its theatrical release.

== Remake ==
The film was remade in Dhallywood as Mukho Mukhi (2001), and in the Tollywood as Mastan (2004).
