= Barsaat (2005 film) =

- Theatrical release poster
- Directed by: Suneel Darshan
- Written by: Rumi Jaffery; K. K. Singh (dialogues)
- Screenplay by: Robin Bhatt; Shyam Goel
- Story by: Suneel Darshan
- Produced by: Suneel Darshan
- Starring: Bobby Deol; Priyanka Chopra; Bipasha Basu
- Cinematography: W. B. Rao
- Edited by: Sanjay Sankla
- Music by: Soundtrack: Nadeem-Shravan; Background Score: Salim-Sulaiman
- Production company: Shree Krishna International
- Release date: 19 August 2005
- Running time: 144 minutes
- Country: India
- Language: Hindi
- Budget: ₹10 crore
- Box office: ₹19.56 crore

Barsaat (lit. 'Rain') is a 2005 Indian Hindi-language romantic drama film directed by Suneel Darshan. It stars Bobby Deol, Priyanka Chopra, and Bipasha Basu. The plot of the film is loosely based on the 2002 American film Sweet Home Alabama.

== Plot ==
Aarav is an ambitious young Indian whose dream is to design cars. He travels to the United States seeking greener pastures, where he meets the beautiful Anna, a firm believer in destiny. Anna instantly falls head over heels for Aarav, but he remains focused on his career. Over time, he mellows and the two fall in love. Moreover, Aarav's ambitions go on the upswing as the chairman of a major auto company in the U.S. gives him a job as a designer.

Coincidentally, the chairman happens to be Anna's grandfather, and after he finds out about Aarav and Anna's relationship, he happily announces their betrothal. Aarav, who wants to marry Anna, tells her he has to go back to India to tend to his sickly father, but actually returns intent on securing a divorce from his childhood sweetheart, Kajal, whom he hadn't seen for three years. Aarav had been forced by his parents to marry Kajal and had left for the United States on their wedding night, and they never consummated their marriage.

After finding out about Aarav's plans, Kajal tries her best to win him back. She yields, however, when Aarav tells her he is in love with another woman and doesn't love Kajal. After having Kajal sign the divorce papers, Aarav submits them to his lawyer. Kajal, who had been living with Aarav's parents, moves out of their house. Feeling guilty, Aarav, who had previously been avoiding Kajal, spends some time with her. He tries to help her financially but finds out that Kajal has started a thriving export company for locally made saris. She's also become fluent in English. Aarav realises that there is more to Kajal than he knows. The two spend the day reliving various childhood memories, and Aarav starts feeling attracted to her again.

Meanwhile, Anna arrives in India. Her grandfather had decided that, since Aarav was already in India, their marriage should also take place there. Aarav tells Anna about Kajal. She quickly forgives him, and he introduces her to Kajal. Anna privately asks Kajal if she feels that Anna stole Aarav away from her. Kajal tells Anna not to worry and that Aarav never really loved her and that their marriage was just an agreement between two families. Anna is impressed by Kajal's independence, and the two become friends. Kajal decides that she will attend Aarav's wedding in order to give her love a proper "funeral."

Kajal asks Anna to wear her old wedding jewellery and helps her get dressed, but Kajal flees the wedding premises shortly after the wedding rituals begin, unable to bear the sight of Aarav marrying someone else. However, Aarav's lawyer interrupts the wedding and informs Aarav that he is not divorced yet because he forgot to sign the divorce papers himself. If Aarav signs the papers right there, his divorce will be final, and he'll be able to marry Anna. However, Aarav finds himself unable to sign the papers, realising that he does love Kajal. It suddenly starts raining.

Anna senses that Aarav loves Kajal and also knows that Kajal still loves Aarav. She tells Aarav that the rain is a sign that he should not get a divorce and reasons that, had he not met Anna, Aarav never would have realized that he loved Kajal. Anna tells him to go back to Kajal. Anna's grandfather threatens to ruin Aarav's career, but Anna tells him that he shouldn't do that and that she knows Aarav loves her, but that "he just loves Kajal a little more." According to her, Aarav is destined to be with Kajal.

Aarav finds Kajal in the place where they used to play when they were kids and tells her that he loved her the whole time. He just didn't realize it. They kiss and get back together. Anna happily watches them and leaves to return to the United States.

== Cast ==
- Bobby Deol as Aarav Kapoor
- Priyanka Chopra as Kajal Kapoor
- Bipasha Basu as Anna Virvani
- Shakti Kapoor as Samir Virvani (Anna's grandfather)
- Manmeet Singh as Maninder Singh (Aarav's friend)
- Farida Jalal as Anushka Sanghi, Kajal's grandmother
- Sharat Saxena as Lawyer
- Gajendra Chauhan as Sunil Kapoor, Aarav's father
- Beena Banerjee as Neeti Kapoor, Aarav's mother
- Vivek Shauq as Shammi
- Dolly Bindra as Shammi's wife
- Supriya Pilgaonkar as Supriya Rajput (Aarav's sister-in-law)
- Mahesh Thakur as Dr. Pranav Kapoor
- Vivek Vaswani as Garage owner
- Palak Jain as child Kajal
- Pushtiie Shakti as Anna's friend

== Reception ==
The film received mixed to negative reviews from critics. Taran Adarsh of Bollywood Hungama gave 1/5 and said Barsaat is like watching a 1970 film. Overall the film was rated 5/10. It was declared below average at the box office.

== Soundtrack ==
Barsaat

Soundtrack album by Nadeem–Shravan
- Released: 16 June 2005
- Recorded: 2004~2005
- Genre: Feature film soundtrack
- Label: Shree Krishna Audio

The soundtrack of the movie was composed by the music duo Nadeem-Shravan, who also composed the 1995 film's soundtrack. The song lyrics were penned by Sameer. Singers Kumar Sanu and Alka Yagnik gave their voices for the song. Other singers who have sung for the album include Abhijeet, Udit Narayan, Alisha Chinai, Sonu Nigam, Kailash Kher, Ishq Bector and Priyanka Chopra. The album was voted ninth in the all-time music sales chart. According to the Indian trade website Box Office India, with around 15,00,000 units sold, this film's soundtrack album was the year's ninth highest-selling.

No	Title	Singer(s)
1	"Barsaat Ke Din Aaye"	Kumar Sanu and Alka Yagnik
2	"Mushkil"	Abhijeet and Alka Yagnik
3	"Pyaar Aaya"	Sonu Nigam and Alka Yagnik
4	"Nakhre"	Alisha Chinai and Ishq Bector
5	"Chori Chori Ladi Akhiyaan"	Udit Narayan, Alka Yagnik, Sapna Awasthi and Indi
6	"Aaja Aaja"	Alka Yagnik
7	"Maine Tumse Pyaar Bahut Kiya"	Alka Yagnik
8	"Saajan Saajan Saajan"	Alka Yagnik, Kailash Kher and Priyanka Chopra
9	"Nakhre (Film Version)"	Alisha Chinai, Ishq Bector and Udit Narayan
