= Shakalaka Boom Boom =

2007 Indian film by Suneel Darshan

- Movie poster for Shakalaka Boom Boom
- Directed by: Suneel Darshan
- Written by: Suneel Darshan; Rajesh Pandey; Anurag Kashyap (dialogue)
- Produced by: Suneel Darshan
- Starring: Bobby Deol; Upen Patel; Kangana Ranaut; Celina Jaitly
- Cinematography: Surendra Rao
- Edited by: Sanjay Sankla
- Music by: Himesh Reshammiya
- Production company: Shree Krishna International
- Distributed by: Shemaroo Entertainment
- Release date: 6 April 2007
- Running time: 129 minutes
- Language: Hindi

Shakalaka Boom Boom is a 2007 Indian Hindi-language musical drama film directed and produced by Suneel Darshan. The film stars Bobby Deol, Upen Patel, Celina Jaitly, and Kangana Ranaut in the lead roles. It was released on 6 April 2007.

Shakalaka Boom Boom is based on conflicts and the power game involved in the functioning of the music industry. The film was partly shot in South Africa.

== Plot ==
Shakalaka Boom Boom follows the tale of a jealous, selfish, and greedy music artist, Ayan Joshi, aka AJ. AJ is one of the finest music artists in the industry and is currently under a stop since he can't think of a new project. AJ is in love with Ruhi and hopes to tell her how he feels. However, a wannabe singer, Reggie, appears who falls in love with Ruhi and woos her before AJ can. Therefore, AJ swears to destroy Reggie's career and hence comes into Reggie's life as his friend. Getting him drunk and smoking is all that AJ has been doing to Reggie, and Reggie even loses control and passes out. One day, AJ finds out all Reggie's secrets and gets him so drunk that his liver fails. While Reggie is in severe pain, AJ takes all his music notes and beats and flees the scene. Then Ruhi shows up and takes him to the hospital. He is admitted with liver failure. Ruhi plans to destroy AJ's career just like he did to Reggie.

Ruhi is unaware that AJ isn't alone; he also has his hidden agenda with Reggie's ex-girlfriend Sheena, who is now a big shot due to AJ. AJ and Sheena together release Reggie's music as their own, which goes on becoming a big hit. At the time of signing music, Ruhi gets her gun out, but the gun doesn't work; she leaves the discotheque. Her leaving disco ball randomly falls on AJ. He is rushed to the hospital, where doctors declare him brought dead. The ending shows AJ going to hell and Reggie waking up to a better life as Reggie and Ruhi reclaim the ownership of their music.

== Cast ==
- Bobby Deol as Ayan Joshi aka A.J.
- Upen Patel as Reggie
- Celina Jaitly as Sheena
- Kangana Ranaut as Ruhi
- Asrani as Yogra
- Dalip Tahil as Kumar
- Anupam Kher as Reggie's Father
- Govind Namdev as Guru
- Vivek Vaswani as Vidyacharan Shukla
- Seema Rahmani as Seema

== Reception ==
=== Critical reception ===
Shakalaka Boom Boom attracted negative reviews from top critics of India. Mayank Shekhar of Hindustan Times rated the film with 1 out of 5 stars. Shakti Salgaokar of DNA gave movie a one and half stars and wrote in his review, "It's simple — sexual innuendo, potshots at popular films, bad mimicry, foreign locations, a generous dose of overacting, an item song and a gora villain. And as he magnificently presents the climax of the film. Spare us the comedy, please?" Nikhat Kazmi of Times of India said, "This one's definitely not for the fastidious, choosy viewer but for those who don't mind losing it for a bit, Shakalaka Boom Boom works like an average Bollywood musical. Performance-wise, it's one big circus with the guys hogging most of the limelight. The girls — Kangana and Celina — are mere confetti". Taran Adarsh also gave it 1.5 out of 5 stars, saying "It's a well-crafted entertainer and lives up to the expectations of its target audience — the youth. At the box-office, its business at the multiplexes will help it generate good revenue, making it a profitable proposition for its investors."
