= Dosti: Friends Forever =

- Theatrical release poster
- Directed by: Suneel Darshan
- Written by: K. K. Singh; Rumi Jaffery (dialogues)
- Screenplay by: Robin Bhatt, Shyam Goel
- Story by: Suneel Darshan
- Produced by: Suneel Darshan
- Starring: Akshay Kumar; Bobby Deol; Kareena Kapoor; Lara Dutta
- Edited by: Sanjay Sankla
- Music by: Songs: Nadeem-Shravan; Background Score: Salim-Sulaiman
- Distributed by: Shree Krishna International
- Release date: 23 December 2005
- Country: India
- Language: Hindi
- Budget: ₹150 million
- Box office: ₹230 million

Dosti: Friends Forever is a 2005 Indian Hindi-language romantic drama film directed by Suneel Darshan starring Akshay Kumar, Bobby Deol, Kareena Kapoor and Lara Dutta. Juhi Chawla makes a special appearance. The film marks the second collaboration between Kumar, Deol, and Kapoor after Ajnabee (2001).

== Plot ==
Karan Thapar lives a wealthy yet very lonesome lifestyle with his business tycoon father Vikram Thapar, mother Kiran Thapar, and sister Nandini Thapar, as no one has time for him. One day, while at the family's farmhouse, he loses his step and almost falls down a deep gorge. He is rescued by Raj Malhotra, an orphan living a poor lifestyle with his abusive maternal uncle. Karan and Raj become inseparable friends, and Raj moves in to live with Karan, much to the chagrin of the Thapar family members who dislike Raj.

Years later, Raj and Karan have grown up; Raj is in love with his childhood sweetheart Anjali Saluja and wants to marry her, while Karan flirts with Leena Bharucha and abandons her. Karan’s relationship with his mother, father, and sister have worsened over the years to the point where he speaks rudely to them and addresses his mother only as “Mrs. Thapar”. Karan subsequently meets with London-returned Kajal Sharma and woos her. She agrees to marry him. Raj's and Karan's weddings are planned for the same day. Things take a turn for the worse when Leena and her dad, who is employed by Thapar, characterize the friends as flirts. Consequently, Kajal breaks up with Karan, and Anjali's brother cancels her wedding with Raj when the latter insulted his friendship with Karan and slapped him across the face upsetting Anjali.

It is later revealed that Raj is in the hospital and is suffering from a fatal disorder. Dr. Aditi Mathur is his doctor, and she is trying to save Raj’s life and Karan arrives there and hugs Raj in tears. Raj tries to convince the members of the Thapar family to make amends with Karan as his last remaining wishes as he would be all alone once Raj passes. Karan reconciles with his family members as they realize their mistakes for neglecting him and disrespecting his friendship with Raj. Raj dies 2 years later, and Karan eventually marries Kajal. Karan and Kajal name their child after Raj, hence fulfilling the promise of the bond of friendship.

== Cast ==
- Juhi Chawla as Dr. Aditi Mathur (special appearance)
- Akshay Kumar as Raj Malhotra
- Bobby Deol as Karan Thapar
- Kareena Kapoor as Anjali Saluja, Raj's love interest.
- Lara Dutta as Kajal Sharma, Karan's love interest.
- Lillete Dubey as Kiran Thapar, Karan and Nandini's mother.
- Kiran Kumar as Vikram Thapar, Karan and Nandini's father.
- Sherlyn Chopra as Leena Bharucha
- Shakti Kapoor as Mr. Varun Bharucha, Leena's father.
- Karishma Tanna as Nandini Thapar, Karan's sister
- Mahesh Thakur as Bhaskar Saluja, Anjali's brother.
- Navni Parihar as Anjali’s sister-in-law
- Aman Verma as Mr. Manoj Saluja, Anjali's husband.
- Dolly Bindra
- Mike Razowzky as Raj Malhotra's friend
- Mickey Dhamejani as Young Raj Malhotra
- Athit Naik as Young Karan Thapar
- Kaneez Surka as Anjali's friend

== Soundtrack ==
Dosti: Friends Forever

Soundtrack album by Nadeem-Shravan
- Released: 17 October 2005
- Genre: Feature film soundtrack
- Label: Shree Krishna Audio

This was the last album of musical duo Nadeem-Shravan before they officially declared to split. The album was released in October 2005. The lyrics of all the songs were written by Sameer. The album was released in October 2005. The album was listed at 7th position in all-time music list of 2005. According to the Indian trade website Box Office India, with around 14,00,000 units sold the soundtrack became the eleventh highest-grossing album of the year.

=== Track listing ===
No.	Title	Singer(s)	Length
1.	"Yeh Dosti"	Udit Narayan & Sonu Nigam	7:05
2.	"Dulhania"	Kunal Ganjawala, Abhijeet Bhattacharya & Alka Yagnik	5:26
3.	"Aisa Koi Zindagi Mein"	Abhijeet Bhattacharya & Alka Yagnik	5:13
4.	"Let's Boogie Woogie"	Kunal Ganjawala, Vasundhara Das & Earl D'Souza	5:45
5.	"Ishq Na Ishq Ho"	Sukhwinder Singh & Kailash Kher	8:03
6.	"Aur Tum Aaye"	Sonu Nigam & Alka Yagnik	5:20
7.	"Yaar Di Shaadi"	Abhijeet Bhattacharya, Sonu Nigam, Alka Yagnik & Sarika Kapoor	5:05

== Home media ==
The collective value of his films' unsold satellite rights was estimated to be ₹150 crore. Darshan finally sold the rights to his films to Zee in 2017, and Dosti premiered on Zee Cinema on 23 September 2017, 12 years after its theatrical release. The film's premier garnered high ratings for the network.
