= Mohnish Bahl =

Indian actor (born 1961)

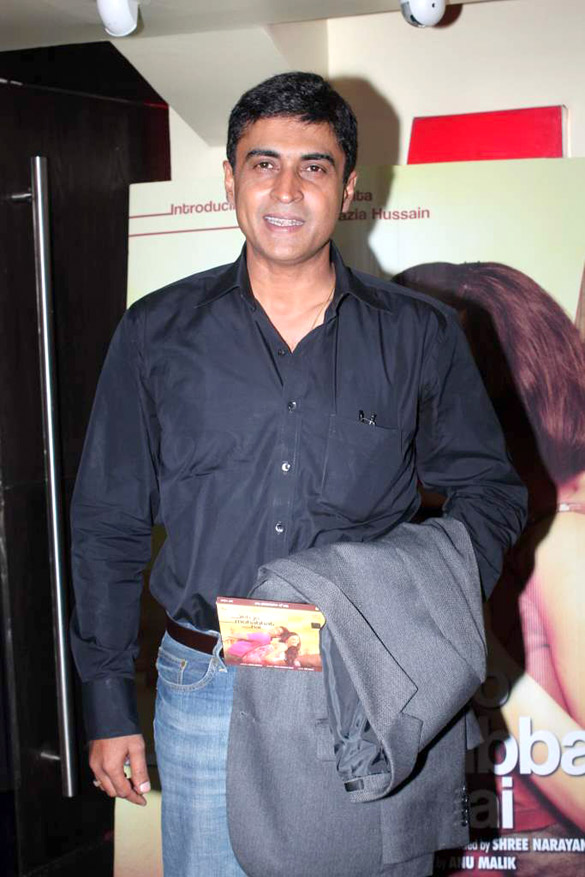
- Mohnish Bahl in 2013
- Born: 14 August 1961 (age 65); Bombay, Maharashtra, India
- Occupation: Actor
- Years active: 1982–present
- Height: 5 ft 8 in (1.73 m)
- Spouse: Ekta Sohini (m. 1992)
- Children: 2, including Pranutan Bahl
- Parent(s): Nutan and Rajnish Bahl
- Relatives: See Mukherjee-Samarth family

Mohnish Bahl (born 14 August 1961) is an Indian actor working in the Indian film industry and on Indian television.

== Career ==
Mohnish Bahl debuted with the film Bekarar in a supporting role opposite Padmini Kolhapure and Sanjay Dutt but the film was a critical and commercial failure. His subsequent release was Teri Bahon Mein, a remake of The Blue Lagoon with Ayesha Dutt, wife of Jackie Shroff, which was also a failure. His only commercial success in a leading role was Purana Mandir though it was considered a B grade film. The films Hum Aapke Hain Koun and Hum Saath-Saath Hain are considered landmark films that transformed Bahl's career. He has starred in over 100 films, and has been nominated for two Filmfare Awards.

== Early life and family ==
Bahl was born in Mumbai, Maharashtra, India. He is the only son of noted actress Nutan and Lt. Cdr. Rajnish Bahl, and is a prominent member of the Mukherjee-Samarth family.

He married actress Aarti Bahl on 23 April 1992 and they have two children: actress Pranutan Bahl and Krishaa Bahl.

== Filmography ==
=== Films ===
Year	Title	Roles	Notes and references
1983	Bekaraar	Pradeep	
1984	Teri Baahon Mein	Manu	
1984	Meri Adalat	Umesh	
1984	Purana Mandir	Sanjay	
1987	Itihaas	Rakesh	
1989	Maine Pyar Kiya	Jeevan	
1990	Baaghi	Jaggu	
1991	Henna	Captain Surendra	
1991	Dancer	Manish	
1992	Abhi Abhi	Helmet, College Student/Goon	
1992	Bol Radha Bol	Bhanu	
1992	Deewana	Narendra	Cameo appearance
1992	Shola Aur Shabnam	Bali	
1993	Phool Aur Angaar	Inspector Arjun Singh	
1993	Ek Hi Raasta	Vikram Singh	
1993	Platform	Hariya	
1993	Aashik Awara	Vikram	
1994	Laadla	Vicky Bajaj	
1994	Eena Meena Deeka	Mangal	
1994	Elaan	Inspector Vijay Sharma	
1994	Prem Yog	Jimmy Narang	
1994	Hum Aapke Hain Koun..!	Rajesh	Nominated—Filmfare Award for Best Supporting Actor
1995	Kartavya	Balveer Singh	
1995	Sabse Bada Khiladi	Amit Singh	
1995	Gundaraj	Deva	
1996	Raja Hindustani	Jay Mitra	
1996	Army	Kabir Dubey	
1996	Megha	Vinod	
1996	Ajay	Roopesh Singh	
1997	Itihaas	Inspector Pandey	
1997	Kaun Sachcha Kaun Jhootha	Mohandas Khanna	
1997	Koyla	Ashok	Cameo appearance
1997	Raja Ki Aayegi Baraat	Ramesh	
1997	Udaan	Inspector Manoj Sharma	
1998	Mohabbat Aur Jung	Bobby	
1998	Duplicate	Ravi Lamba	
1998	Dulhe Raja	Rahul Sinha	
1998	Aunty No. 1	Gaurav	
1998	Hitler	Monty Bhalla	
1998	Phool Bane Patthar	Baliya Singh	
1998	Doli Saja Ke Rakhna	Vicky	
1998	Pardesi Babu	Naren	
1999	Teri Mohabbat Ke Naam	Balwant	
1999	Sirf Tum	Ranjeet	
1999	Vaastav	Vijaykanth Shivalkar	
1999	Hum Saath-Saath Hain	Vivek Chaturvedi	Nominated—Filmfare Award for Best Supporting Actor
1999	Jaanwar	Aditya Oberoi	
1999	Jaalsaaz	Sukhdev	
2000	Kaho Naa... Pyaar Hai	Inspector Dilip Kadam	
2000	Astitva	Malhaar Kamat	Bilingual film (Hindi and Marathi)
2000	Kahin Pyaar Na Ho Jaye	Vinod Jaisingh	
2001	Ek Rishtaa: The Bond of Love	Rajesh Purohit	
2001	Kyo Kii	Rajat Diwan	
2002	Haan Maine Bhi Pyaar Kiya	Rohit Kashyap	
2003	LOC: Kargil	Ramakrishnan Vishwanathan	
2004	Yeh Lamhe Judaai Ke	Sujit	
2005	Vaah! Life Ho Toh Aisi!	Sunil Verma	
2006	Shaadi Karke Phas Gaya Yaar	Karan / Police Constable Harvinder Singh Harvi	
2006	Vivah	Dr. Rashid Khan	
2007	Life Mein Kabhie Kabhiee	Sanjiv Arora (Rajiv's elder brother)	
2010	Chance Pe Dance	Rajeev Sharama	
2010	Isi Life Mein...!	Ravimohan	
2011	Force	Atul Kalsekar	
2011	Desi Boyz	Vikrant Mehra	
2013	Krrish 3	Kaal’s late adoptive father	Cameo appearance
2014	Jai Ho	Ashok Pradhan	
2019	Panipat	Balaji Baji Rao	

== Television ==
Year	Serial	Role	Notes
1988–1989	Isi Bahane		
2000	Choodiyan		
2002–2004	Devi	Vikram	
2002	Bachke Rehna Zara Sambhalke	Host	
2002–2005	Sanjivani – A Medical Boon	Dr. Shashank Gupta	
2003	Arzoo Hai Tu	Aakash	
2005–2006	Kahaani Ghar Ghar Kii	Suyash Mehra	
2005–2007	Ek Ladki Anjaani Si	Veer	
2007	Kayamath	Inder Shah	
2007–2010	Dill Mill Gayye	Dr. Shashank Gupta	sequel series of Sanjivani – A Medical Boon
2007–2009	Kasturi	Kabir Dhanrajgir	
2009	Star Vivaah	Host	
2011–2012	Kuch Toh Log Kahenge	Dr. Ashutosh	
2012–2014	Savdhaan India	Host/presenter	
2016–2017	Hoshiyar… Sahi Waqt, Sahi Kadam	Host/presenter	Host
2019–2020	Sanjivani	Dr. Shashank Gupta	reboot series of Sanjivani – A Medical Boon

== Awards and nominations ==
- 1995: Nominated, Filmfare Award for Best Supporting Actor for Hum Aapke Hain Koun..!
- 2000: Nominated, Filmfare Award for Best Supporting Actor for Hum Saath-Saath Hain: We Stand United
- 2002: Indian Television Academy Award for Best Actor for Sanjivani – A Medical Boon on Star Plus
- 2002: Indian Telly Award for Best Actor in a Negative Role for Devi on Sony Entertainment Television
- 2003: Best Actor Indian Television Academy for Sanjivani – A Medical Boon on Star Plus
