= Haan Maine Bhi Pyaar Kiya =

2002 film by Dharmesh Darshan

- Theatrical release poster
- Directed by: Dharmesh Darshan
- Written by: Dharmesh Darshan; Raj Sinha; Naseem Mukri
- Produced by: Suneel Darshan
- Starring: Akshay Kumar; Abhishek Bachchan; Karisma Kapoor
- Cinematography: W. B. Rao
- Edited by: Bharat
- Music by: Songs: Nadeem-Shravan; Background Score: Surinder Sodhi
- Production company: Shree Krishna Productions
- Distributed by: Tips Industries
- Release date: 15 February 2002 (India)
- Running time: 175 minutes
- Country: India
- Language: Hindi
- Budget: ₹11 crore
- Box office: ₹19.55 crore

Haan Maine Bhi Pyaar Kiya (transl. Yes, I have loved as well) is a 2002 Indian Hindi-language romantic drama film directed by Dharmesh Darshan and produced by Suneel Darshan. The film stars Akshay Kumar, Abhishek Bachchan, and Karisma Kapoor.

== Plot ==
Shiv and Pooja are both looking for a job. They happen to be interviewed the same day in the same company, and both are equally qualified for the job. At the interview venue, when Pooja sees that it will be difficult for her to get the job, she fools Shiv and gets the job. Later on, when Shiv gets a job at that company, he learns that Pooja fooled him. After a lot of pranks and fun, they fall in love and happily marry, but sometimes they get into petty arguments coming from the way they approach life. Shiv takes each day as it comes, while Pooja's imagination sometimes gets the best of her.

Pooja gives up her career for him and settles down as a housewife. They go on their honeymoon to Switzerland, and there they meet Meghna, who happens to be Shiv's college friend. One day, when Shiv returns from a conference, he finds that Meghna is stuck on the road since her car is damaged. So Shiv decides to give a lift to Meghna since they happen to be staying in the same hotel. On account of the weather getting worse, they are unable to return to the hotel on time, so they have to stay in a hotel midway. The differences between Shiv and Pooja worsen and Shiv ends up spending the night with Meghna. Pooja overhears them talking about how they should put their one-night stand behind them. Shocked and hurt, she asks for a divorce right away and leaves him.

Pooja then moves to Mumbai, where she gets a job as the secretary of Raj, who is a film star. Raj has everything anyone could ask for: money, fame, but not love. She happily works as his secretary, and Raj falls in love with Pooja, and she also likes him. One day they go for a shooting in Naini Hills, and Pooja finds that Shiv happens to be the manager of the hotel where they stay. Pooja tells Shiv that she still cannot forgive Shiv for what happened in the past. Raj asks Shiv to be the best man at his wedding. So Shiv decides that he will not interfere in Pooja's life anymore. But on the day of the wedding, Pooja realises that she is still in love with Shiv and should have forgiven him. Raj overhears this and decides to reunite Pooja and Shiv. They remarry and soon have a baby girl.

== Cast ==
- Akshay Kumar as Raj Malhotra
- Karishma Kapoor as Pooja Kashyap / Pooja Shiv Kapoor
- Abhishek Bachchan as Shiv Kapoor
- Kader Khan as Babban Miyan
- Himani Shivpuri as Maria
- Shakti Kapoor as Chinni
- Navneet Nishan as Neha
- Mohnish Bahl as Rohit Kashyap, Pooja's brother
- Supriya Karnik as Neha Kashyap, Pooja's sister-in-law
- Simone Singh as Meghna
- Upasana Singh as Kismis
- Dolly Bindra Mrs. Chana Singh
- Razak Khan as Dil-phenk Hyderabadi
- Sophiya Haque as dancer in the song "Zindagi Ko Bina Pyaar" (special appearance)

== Soundtrack ==
The soundtrack of the film was composed by the duo Nadeem-Shravan with lyrics by Sameer. According to the Indian trade website Box Office India, with around 18,00,000 units sold, this film's soundtrack album was the year's eleventh highest-selling.

#	Song	Singer(s)	Length
1.	"Hum Yaar Hain Tumhare"	Udit Narayan, Alka Yagnik	07:12
2.	"Teri Aankhon Ka Andaaz"	Udit Narayan, Alka Yagnik	06:45
3.	"Har Kisike Dil Mein"	Udit Narayan, Alka Yagnik	06:05
4.	"Zindagi Ko Bina Pyaar"	Kumar Sanu, Sarika Kapoor	07:02
5.	"Mubarak Mubarak"	Udit Narayan	07:05
6.	"Hum Pyaar Hain Tumhare"	Kumar Sanu, Alka Yagnik	07:04
7.	"Zindagi Ko Bina Pyaar (Female)"	Alka Yagnik	07:03
8.	"Teri Aankhon Ka Andaaz"	Instrumental	06:08

== Reception ==
Taran Adarsh of IndiaFM gave the film one out of five, writing, "On the whole, HAAN MAINE BHI PYAAR KIYA has nothing new to offer to the viewer, barring an exciting star cast. But without the backing of a cohesive script, the best of stars pale into insignificance." Ronjita Kulkarni of Rediff gave a negative review, writing, "Haan… Maine Bhi Pyaar Kiya leaves much to be desired. I, for one, would have liked to see more than that dazed look and teary eyes.

In 2011, Rediff.com called it one of the worst films of 2000s, writing, "Lousy acting, lackluster soundtrack and complete lack of excitement (considering there's Dolly Bindra in it), that's Haan...Maine blah blah for you."
