= Sapna Awasthi =

Indian playback singer

- Education: Bhatkhande Music Institute
- Occupation: playback singer

Sapna Awasthi Singh is a Bollywood playback singer best known for her "Banno Teri Ankhiyan Soorme" from Dushmani (1995), "Pardesi Pardesi" from Raja Hindustani (1996), "Chaiyya Chaiyya" from Dil Se.. (1998), "Angoori Badan" from Jaanwar (1998), "UP Bihar Lootne" from Shool (1999) and "Sab Kuchh Bhula Diya" from Hum Tumhare Hain Sanam.

== Early life and career ==
Sapna Awasthi started training in classical music at a young age and completed Sangeet Vishaarad in Bhatkhande Music Institute, Lucknow. She began singing for the radio when she was fifteen, before performing on stage. She received her first break in Bollywood from composer Sameer Sen.

Awasthi is from Kumaon region of Uttarakhand and relocated to Mumbai after singing songs in Krantiveer (1994). She has sung for prominent musicians like Nadeem–Shravan, Anand–Milind, Anu Malik, A. R. Rahman, Sandeep Chowta and others. Her biggest hits are 'Chaiyya Chaiyya' (co-singer Sukhvinder Singh) for A. R. Rahman's Dil Se (1998) and 'Pardesi Pardesi' (co-singers Udit Narayan and Alka Yagnik) for Nadeem-Shravan's Raja Hindustani (1996).

== Discography ==
=== Hindi film songs ===
Songs	Films	Year
Pratighat Ki Jwala	Anjaam	1994
Haldi Lagaao Re	Banni Ko Banna Pyara Lage (with Jhankar Beats)	1994
Jhankaro Jhankaro	Krantiveer	1994
Jai Ambe Jagdambe	Krantiveer	1994
O Rabba	Zamaana Deewana	1995
Banno Teri Ankhiyan Soorme	Dushmani: A Violent Love Story	1995
Nazariya Band Kar Ke	Chakori	1995
Pardesi Pardesi	Raja Hindustani	1996
Suhaag Maagan Jaaye (Title Music)	Pardes	1997
Chaiyya Chaiyya	Dil Se..	1998
Angoori badan	Jaanwar	1998
AISI WAISI BAAT NAHIN	Hero Hindustani	1998
Balle Balle	Bandhan (Original Motion Picture Soundtrack)	1998
Angoorwali Bagiyan	Maa Kasam	1999
Main Aayi Hoon U.P. Bihar Lootne	Shool	1999
Ghar Mein Padharo Gajananji	Aangan Baje Shehnaai	1999
Shadi Karvaho	Jis Desh Mein Ganga Rehta Hai	2000
Beech Bajaria	Ansh	2001
Aangoori Badan	Hadh: Life on the Edge of Death	2001
Bachke Tu Rehna Re	Company	2002
Sab Kuchh Bhula Diya	Hum Tumhare Hain Sanam	2002
Khallas	Company	2002
Mar Gai Chhokri	Yeh Mohabbat Hai	2002
Saajan Saajan	Dil Ka Rishta	2003
Daroga Babu Re Dil Humra	30 Days	2003
Saajan Saajan	Dil Ka Rishta	2003
Kuan Ma	Page 3	2004
Tere Ishq Mein Pagal	Humko Tumse Pyaar Hai	2005
Dhola Aayo Re	Humko Tumse Pyaar Hai	2005
Kata Kata	Raavan	2010
Katiya Karoon	Rockstar	2011
Sasure Ke Kaudy Lag Gaye	Miss Tanakpur Haazir Ho	2015
Banno Teri Akhiyan	Banno Teri Akhiyan	2022
Navratri Song	Navratri Song	2023

=== Assamese film songs ===
Songs	Films	Year
Ujonire Rail Khoni	Uroniya Mon	2007

=== Nepalese film songs ===
Songs	Films	Year
Dhuda Pani Gayan	Ta Ta Sarai Bigris Ni Badri	2000

=== Bhojpuri Film song ===
Songs	Films	Year
"Duno Duariya	Dulha Milal Dildar	2005

== Accolades ==
Award Ceremony	Category	Recipient	Result	Reference(s)
4th Mirchi Music Awards	Female Vocalist of The Year	Recipient	Nominated	
