= Ek Rishtaa: The Bond of Love =

2001 film by Suneel Darshan

- Movie poster
- Directed by: Suneel Darshan
- Written by: K. K. Singh (dialogues)
- Screenplay by: Robin Bhatt; S. M. Ahale
- Story by: Suneel Darshan
- Produced by: Suneel Darshan
- Starring: Amitabh Bachchan; Akshay Kumar; Rakhee Gulzar; Juhi Chawla; Karishma Kapoor; Mohnish Bahl
- Cinematography: Sameer Reddy
- Edited by: Sanjay Sankla
- Music by: Songs: Nadeem–Shravan; Background Score: Naresh Sharma
- Production company: Shree Krishna International
- Release date: 18 May 2001 (India)
- Running time: 180 minutes
- Country: India
- Language: Hindi
- Budget: ₹15 crore
- Box office: ₹36.5 crore

Ek Rishtaa: The Bond of Love (transl. A Relationship: The Bond of Love) is a 2001 Indian Hindi-language drama film directed by Suneel Darshan. The film stars Amitabh Bachchan, Akshay Kumar, Rakhee Gulzar, Juhi Chawla, Karishma Kapoor, and Mohnish Bahl. It was the first film where Bachchan and Kumar worked together. The film is a family drama where a big family encounters a crisis when disputes take place between the father (Bachchan) and the son (Kumar). The film earned over ₹365 million (US$3.8 million) at the worldwide box office.

== Plot ==
Vijay Kapoor is a successful businessman who lives happily with his wife Pratima and four children. His only son, Ajay, has come back home after graduating from university abroad with a Masters in Information Technology. Vijay's eldest daughter Priti is charmed by Rajesh Purohit, a recent graduate in business who idolizes Vijay. Rajesh's capabilities likewise impress Vijay, and he gives his consent for Rajesh to marry Priti. However, the devious Rajesh plans to ingratiate himself with the Kapoor family with the aim of stealing Vijay's fortune for himself. Meanwhile, Ajay falls in love with and plans to marry Nisha Thapar.

Ajay tells his father that he would like to start his own business, but Vijay tries to dissuade him, saying that Ajay should first get experience working in the family business before striking out on his own. However, ideological differences result in disputes between them. Ajay consequently stands firm in his decision to start his own business. Later, he takes out a loan for this. Vijay gets furious and kicks Ajay out of the house. Ajay marries and moves with Nisha into their new house. Rajesh makes Vijay sign a power of attorney empowering him, and is forced to pay the court a huge sum, which he cannot afford. Thus, he goes bankrupt, and all his fortune goes to Rajesh.

Ajay learns that Rajesh incited arguments between him and Vijay. He tries to get close to Vijay again, causing a crisis in his marriage with Nisha, who isn't pleased with Ajay's reunion with his family. They get separated due to consistent arguments between them. She finds out that she is pregnant, and Ajay returns home. Now, his mission is to return his family fortune and Vijay's faith, as the latter still cannot forgive him. Eventually, Ajay and Vijay unite, although he is yet to return the fortune.

Rajesh begins treating Priti badly, who also returns home. To make matters worse, Ajay learns that Vijay's old friend, Brij, also has turned his back on the latter, and had disassociated with him. To return his family fortune violently, Ajay forces Rajesh to sign another power of attorney which says the money comes back to the owner. With that, Vijay is able to settle the court payments. Priti tells Rajesh that she can never forgive him for the atrocities he inflicted on her family and orders him to leave for good. Nisha and Ajay unite, and the family finally comes together.

== Cast ==
- Amitabh Bachchan as Vijay Kapoor
- Akshay Kumar as Ajay Kapoor
- Raakhee as Pratima Kapoor
- Juhi Chawla as Priti Kapoor Purohit
- Karishma Kapoor as Nisha Thapar Kapoor
- Mohnish Behl as Rajesh Purohit
- Simone Singh as Priya Kapoor Mehra
- Kanika Kohli as Rani Kapoor
- Alok Nath as Jagmohan Thapar
- Shakti Kapoor as Ladoo
- Ashish Vidyarthi as Hari Singh
- Sharat Saxena as Inspector Swarnvijay Shergill
- Avtar Gill as Vivek Khanna
- Anang Desai as Brijbhan "Brij" Singh
- Mayur Verma as Kapil Mehra
- Tej Sapru as Balwant
- Vishwajeet Pradhan as Ankit Dalal
- Anil Nagrath as Anil Dalal
- Kunickaa Sadanand as Sweety Aunty
- Vrajesh Hirjee as Brahmeshwar, a sandwich seller
- Suniel Shetty as Himself (Special appearance)
- Nagma as herself in the song "Mulakat" (Special appearance)

== Soundtrack ==
Ek Rishtaa

Studio album by Nadeem–Shravan
- Released: 18 May 2001
- Recorded: 2000
- Genre: Feature film soundtrack
- Label: Tips
- Producer: Nadeem–Shravan

Nadeem–Shravan chronology
Kasoor (2001)	Ek Rishtaa (2001)	Hum Ho Gaye Aapke (2001)

Professional ratings
Review scores
Source	Rating
Planet Bollywood	7.5/10 stars

The music was composed by Nadeem–Shravan while lyrics were by Sameer. The album was a chartbuster when released, According to the Indian trade website Box Office India, with around 18,00,000 units sold the soundtrack became the tenth highest-selling album of the year.

#	Title	Singer(s)
1.	"Ek Dil Hai"	Kumar Sanu, Alka Yagnik
2.	"Hum Khush Hue"	Kumar Sanu, Mohammed Aziz, Alka Yagnik, Sarika Kapoor
3.	"Ek Raja Hai Ek Rani Hai"	Anuradha Paudwal, Mohammed Aziz, Sarika Kapoor, Milind Ingle
4.	"Dil Lagane Ki Sazaa"	Kumar Sanu, Alka Yagnik
5.	"Dil Deewana Dhoondta Hai"	Kumar Sanu, Alka Yagnik
6.	"Mohabbat Ne Mohabbat Ko"	Udit Narayan, Alka Yagnik
7.	"Aur Kya Zindagani Hai"	Mohammed Aziz
8.	"Mulaqaat"	Alka Yagnik
9.	"Dil Lagaane Ki Sazaa"	Instrumental

== Release ==
=== Critical reception ===
Dharmesh Rajput of BBCi-Films gave it 3.5 out of 5 stars, praising the performance of Amitabh Bachchan stating, "the real pleasure of this film is Amitabh's performance — is it any wonder he was voted best actor at the BBC Online Millennium Polls? This man is good value for money on the big screen". N.K Deoshi of Apunkachoice.com also gave the film 3.5 out of 5 stars but said "Suneel Darshan had all the ingredients to make a blockbuster, a celluloid virtuoso like Big B, a bevy of willowy beauties Karisma, Juhi and Simone Singh and, last but not the least, the khiladi Akshay Kumar. But despite such an impressive ensemble Ek Rishta turns out to be quite a disappointing fare". Savera R Someshwar of Rediff.com gave the a negative review calling the screenplay terrible but praised the performances of Amitabh, Akshay, Karishma, Rakhee Gulzar, Juhi Chawla and Mohnish Behl.

=== Box office ===
It was the seventh highest-grossing Hindi film of 2001.

== Home media ==
Ek Rishtaa was released on DVD on 6 August 2001 across all regions in an NTSC-format single disc by Tip Top Video. A high-definition DVD version, with audio and video digitally restored, was later released by Shemaroo Entertainment. Even after Ek Rishtaa's box office success, as he had with his previous works, Darshan refused to sell the film's television rights. The collective value of his films' unsold satellite rights was estimated to be ₹150 crore. Darshan finally sold the rights to his films to Zee in 2017, and Ek Rishtaa premiered on Zee Cinema on 16 September 2017, 16 years after its theatrical release. The film's premier garnered high ratings for the network.
