= Lootere =

1993 film by Dharmesh Darshan

- Theatrical release poster
- Directed by: Dharmesh Darshan
- Screenplay by: Dharmesh Darshan; Rajiv Kaul; Praful Parekh
- Dialogues by: Kamlesh Pandey
- Story by: Dharmesh Darshan
- Produced by: Suneel Darshan
- Starring: Sunny Deol; Juhi Chawla; Naseeruddin Shah; Chunky Pandey; Pooja Bedi; Anupam Kher
- Cinematography: W. B. Rao
- Edited by: A. Muthu
- Music by: Score: Viju Shah; Songs: Anand–Milind
- Production company: Shree Krishna International
- Distributed by: Tips Industries
- Release date: 2 April 1993
- Country: India
- Language: Hindi

Lootere is a 1993 Bollywood action love story movie, written and directed by Dharmesh Darshan, and produced by Suneel Darshan.

The film stars Sunny Deol and Juhi Chawla as the main leads, along with Naseeruddin Shah, Chunky Pandey, Pooja Bedi and Anupam Kher in supporting roles.

The film was a blockbuster and one of the highest-grossing films of the year.

== Plot ==
Lootere is a tale of love, duty, and survival against the backdrop of a ruthless criminal world. The love story centres on Karan, a dedicated and honest police officer, and Anjali, a girl whose life is turned upside down when she becomes the sole witness against a powerful underworld don, Chengez Lala.

The film begins with Inspector Karan being assigned the crucial task of protecting Anjali. With Lala's goons relentlessly hunting her down, Karan's only option is to take her far away from the city's dangers, to a secluded and safe location. This forced proximity and the shared experience of being on the run lead to an unexpected bond between them. After some skirmishes, sexual tension builds between them. As they navigate the wilderness and fend off threats, a deep and genuine love blossoms between them.

Their newfound romance, however, is constantly tested by the looming danger from Lala. The narrative intensifies as Karan must not only protect Anjali from the numerous assassins sent to silence her but also fight for their right to a life together. The film is a thrilling chase, with Karan using his wit and combat skills to outsmart and overpower his enemies.

To add to the plot’s drama and action, Inspector Ali is police officer who assists Karan, while Laila’s chief henchman Sikander takes on a pivotal role that further complicates the plot. The crux of the story lies in Karan's relentless battle against the criminal forces that seek to destroy his love and the girl he is sworn to protect.

== Cast ==
- Sunny Deol as Inspector Karan Chopra – Anjali's boyfriend
- Juhi Chawla as Anjali – Karan’s girlfriend
- Naseeruddin Shah as Sikander – Lala's chief henchman
- Chunky Pandey as Inspector Ali – Karan’s friend
- Anupam Kher as Changez Lala
- Pooja Bedi as Devyani – Lala's sister
- Subbiraj as Police Commissioner
- Anang Desai as Inspector Brijesh Rane
- Sharat Saxena as Suraj – Lala's Henchman
- Mahesh Anand as Lakhan – Lala's Henchman
- Dan Dhanoa as Naresh – Lala's Henchman
- Jack Gaud as Bhim – Lala's Henchman
- Ajit Vachani as Teja – Lala's Associate
- Mushtaq Khan as Constable Prakash Joshi
- Dinesh Anand as Harmesh – Lala's Henchman

== Music and soundtrack ==
Lootere (Original Motion Picture Soundtrack)

Soundtrack album by Anand–Milind
- Released: 26 February 1993
- Recorded: 1992–1993
- Genres: Motion picture soundtrack, filmi
- Length: 42:39
- Language: Hindi
- Label: Tips
- Producer: Anand–Milind
External audio
- Lootere (Jukebox) on YouTube

The background score of the film was done by Viju Shah. The music for the film's songs was composed by Anand–Milind.

The lyrics of all but two songs were written by Majrooh Sultanpuri. The lyrics of the song "O Lootere O Lootere" were penned by Manoj Kumar, while director Dharmesh Darshan wrote the lyrics of the song "Main Teri Rani Tu Raja Mera".

The songs featured in the top 10 albums of the year.

Song	Lyricist	Singer
"Aaja Aanewale Aaja"	Majrooh Sultanpuri	Asha Bhosle
"Ae Sawan Baras Zara"	Majrooh Sultanpuri	Lata Mangeshkar, Suresh Wadkar
"O Lootere O Lootere"	Manoj Kumar	Lata Mangeshkar, Manhar Udhas
"Mujhe Le Chal Mandir"	Majrooh Sultanpuri	Pankaj Udhas, Alka Yagnik
"Meri Barbaad Mohabbat Pukare"	Majrooh Sultanpuri	Mohammad Aziz, Alka Yagnik
"Main Teri Rani Tu Raja Mera"	Dharmesh Darshan	Kumar Sanu, Alka Yagnik
"Jis Dil Ne Tujh Ko"	Majrooh Sultanpuri	Kumar Sanu, Anupama Deshpande
"Oye Pape"	Majrooh Sultanpuri	Sukhwinder Singh, Sapna Mukherjee
