= Talaash: The Hunt Begins... =

- DVD cover
- Directed by: Suneel Darshan
- Screenplay by: Robin Bhatia
- Story by: Suneel Darshan
- Produced by: Pahlaj Nihalani
- Starring: Raakhee; Akshay Kumar; Kareena Kapoor; Pooja Batra
- Cinematography: W. B. Rao
- Edited by: Sanjay Sankla
- Music by: Sanjeev Darshan
- Distributed by: Chiragdeep International
- Release date: 3 January 2003
- Running time: 159 minutes
- Country: India
- Language: Hindi

Talaash: The Hunt Begins... is a 2003 Indian Hindi-language action thriller film starring Raakhee, Akshay Kumar and Kareena Kapoor. It is directed by Suneel Darshan and produced by Pahlaj Nihalani. This film released on January 3, 2003, and received negative reviews and was a disaster at the box office. Incidentally, Kapoor would also act in an unrelated film of the same name, nine years later, which was successful.

== Plot ==
Babu (Suresh Oberoi) works for a gang that is led by Chhote Pathan (Kabir Bedi) and his men Rajjo Singh (Raj Babbar) and D.K Sharma (Dalip Tahil). Babu knows many of the gang's secrets, and Chhote promises him that if he keeps his mouth shut, they will look after his family; they betray him. He is rescued by an honest police inspector (Ashish Vidyarthi). Babu returns home to find that his wife Poornima (Raakhee), Arjun (his son), and Pooja (his daughter) live a destitute life from Chhote's betrayal. He tells Poornima that they betrayed him for his silence and swears vengeance. He then teams up with the inspector and reveals the locations of their deals, and many gang members are arrested. Chhote finds Babu hiding and threatens him. He and his men take him to Babu's home, and punish him in front of Poornima and her children. Arjun is out doing his job to earn money, and only Poornima and Pooja are present at home. Poornima begs Chhote to forgive them and promises to leave the city. Chhote grabs Pooja and then tells Poornima that he will take his daughter with them, raise her for 10–12 years, then sell her. Babu tries to save his daughter and Chhote decapitates him. Pooja screams for help when she sees her brother returning home from work. He fails to follow her, and he runs back home to find his father dead and his mother having a mental breakdown; she considers Pooja's toy doll her daughter and does not recognize Arjun. Arjun goes to the inspector, who cannot find Chhote or Pooja. He tells Arjun that they have completely disappeared and may have fled the city. Arjun promises that he will not give up and promises to search for his sister.

Ten years later, Poornima is housed in a mental hospital, and Arjun Raichand (Akshay Kumar) has become a high-profile vigilante. He works for the police inspector, now the Commissioner of Police, by exposing illegal firearms transactions. The Commissioner of Police tells Arjun that he finds a clue that may lead him to Pooja. He tells Arjun how after Chhote and his gang murdered his father, fled the city and reached the city of Ghaziabad, Chhote and Rajjo were killed in a police chase. D.K. Sharma took over the gang and disappeared, and there has been no news of him since. He learned about Shetty (Rami Reddy), a famous arms smuggler who was once Chhote's driver. Arjun finds Shetty and asks where his sister is. Shetty tells him that Sharma knows, and tries to shoot Arjun, but is shot by the Commissioner instead. From the police control room, they see Sharma arriving from a flight, and him taking a girl named Tina Saluja (Kareena Kapoor) on a London tour.

Arjun catches Sharma and interrogates him. Sharma says that Rajjo is still alive and knows where his sister is, and Tina is his daughter. Arjun drops Sharma to his death.

Back at the police control room, the Commissioner shows camera footage proving Rajjo is alive. Arjun travels to Amritsar and meets Sardar Vichitra Singh (Gulshan Grover), and tells him that he has come to find Rajjo.

Arjun reveals to Tina her father's identity. Tina confronts Rajjo, and he realizes his mistakes. Before he can reveal where Chhote has kept Pooja, he is shot and dies in Tina's arms. Tina tells Arjun to follow Rocky. Chhote makes an appearance, and Arjun kills him and Rocky. Arjun comes back to India with Pooja and reunites with Tina and his family.

== Cast ==
- Raakhee as Purnima Raichand
- Akshay Kumar as Arjun Raichand
- Kareena Kapoor as Tina Saluja
- Pooja Batra as Kamini Arora
- Suresh Oberoi as Babu Raichand
- Kabir Bedi as Chhote Pathan
- Rami Reddy as Shetty
- Gulshan Grover as Sardarji, Vichitra Singh
- Shakti Kapoor as Upadhyay
- Dalip Tahil as D.K. Sharma
- Ashish Vidyarthi as Police Commissioner
- Sharat Saxena as Black John, Mafia Don
- Jeetu Verma as Junior, Black John Brother
- Raj Babbar as Rajjo Singh
- Arbaaz Ali Khan as Rocky (Chhote Pathan's henchman)
- Anirudh Agarwal
- Razak Khan as Razak Khan, a TT
- Upasana Singh
- Vrajesh Hirjee as Pepsi
- Dinesh Hingoo as Astrologer in Train
- Viju Khote as Popatbhai
- Supriya Karnik as Kokila (Coca Cola) Shah
- Kunickaa Sadanand
- Veeru Krishnan as Mummy
- Dolly Bindra
- Rakesh Bedi

== Soundtrack ==
The soundtrack was composed by Sanjeev-Darshan. PlanetBollywood.com wrote "Talaash is a good example of a bad soundtrack. The over-worked Sameer seriously needs to put more effort into his writing instead of just recycling his previous songs. As for Sanjeev-Darshan, this film is just another addition to their continuing list of pathetic scores".

- Dil Le Gaya Pardesi - Alka Yagnik
- Bhangra Paa Le - Udit Narayan, Anuradha Sriram
- Tune Kaha Jab Se Haan - Shaan, Alka Yagnik
- Masoom Chehra (Male) - Kumar Sanu
- Baaga Ma Jab Mor Bole - Alka Yagnik
- Yaar Badal Na Jaana - Udit Narayan, Alka Yagnik
- Masoom Chehra (Female) - Alka Yagnik
- Zindagi Se Jung - Alka Yagnik
- Rabba Pyaar Se Mila De - Vasundhara Das

== Reception ==
Rediff wrote "Talaash has no story. Darshan seems undecided whether to focus on the main plot (Akshay Kumar's search for his sister) or the love angle (between Akshay and Kareena Kapoor). The result is that he goofs up on both fronts and you have one confused film". Bollywood Hungama wrote "TALAASH follows the oft-repeated track all through, from start to finish. And that's where the fault lies. Although the basic storyline is interesting, the way the drama unfolds gives you a feeling of 'been there, done that'". Planet Bollywood wrote "Don't expect perfect-ness or glory but entertainment that is tolerable at best".
