= Akshay Kumar filmography =

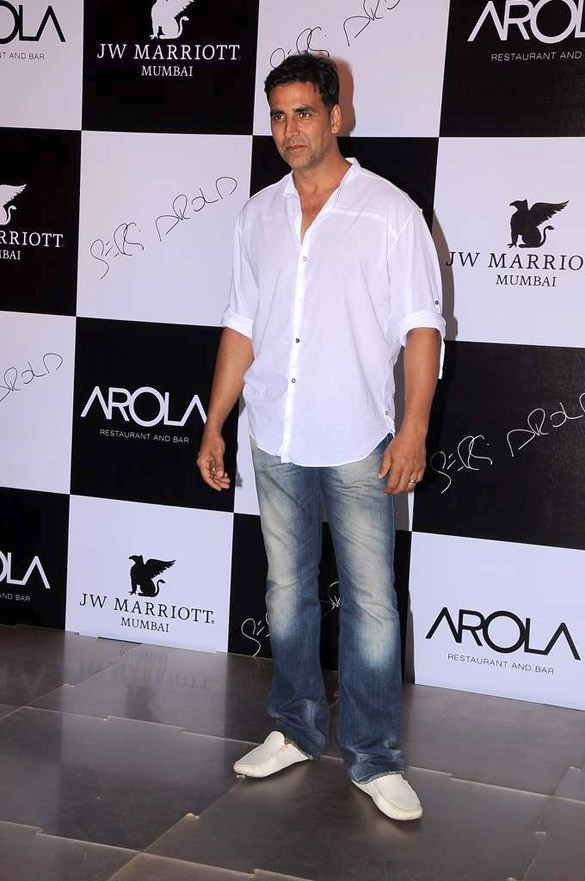
Kumar in 2012

Akshay Kumar is an Indian actor, television presenter, and film producer who works in Hindi-language films. He had a minor role in the 1987 Indian film Aaj. He debuted in a leading role with the film Saugandh (1991) before his breakthrough with Khiladi (1992), first film of the Khiladi series. In 1994, Kumar featured in the successful releases Elaan, Mohra, Main Khiladi Tu Anari, Suhaag and the romantic drama Yeh Dillagi, which earned him a Filmfare Award for Best Actor nomination. He also found success with Khiladiyon Ka Khiladi (1996) and Dil To Pagal Hai (1997), which earned him a Filmfare Award for Best Supporting Actor nomination. However, several other of his 1990s releases performed poorly at the box office, leading to a brief setback in his film career.

The 1999 psychological thriller Sangharsh (1999) and crime drama Jaanwar (1999) marked Kumar's comeback. His next films Hera Pheri (2000), Dhadkan (2000) and Ajnabee (2001) were well received. He played a negative role in the latter, winning the Filmfare Best Villain Award and then appeared in Andaaz (2003), Aitraaz (2004), Khakee (2004) and Aan: Men at Work (2004) and Waqt (2005). In this period, Kumar also proved himself as a great comic actor when he featured in financially successful comedies like Mujhse Shaadi Karogi (2004), Garam Masala (2005), Bhagam Bhag (2006), Phir Hera Pheri (2006), Namastey London (2007), Heyy Babyy (2007), Welcome (2007), Bhool Bhulaiyaa (2007), Singh Is Kinng (2008), Housefull (2010) and Tees Maar Khan (2010). He won the Filmfare Best Comedian Award for Garam Masala. In 2004, he presented the television series Seven Deadly Arts with Akshay Kumar. In 2008, he founded the Hari Om Entertainment production company, and hosted the reality shows Fear Factor: Khatron Ke Khiladi and MasterChef India in 2010. In 2011 he founded another production company Grazing Goat Pictures, and produced the Indo-Canadian hockey-based film Breakaway, which became the highest grossing cross-cultural film at the Canadian box office.

Kumar again conquered the domestic box office in 2012 with his hit masala film Rowdy Rathore, the comedies Housefull 2 and Khiladi 786, and the satire OMG – Oh My God! with the former two being his first films to enter 100 Crore Club. Shortly thereafter, he established a great box office pull with multiple diverse successful projects like the heist film Special 26 (2013), the action thrillers Holiday (2014) and Airlift (2016), the spy drama Baby (2015), the masala film Gabbar Is Back (2015), the comedies Singh Is Bliing (2015) and Housefull 3 (2016), the crime thriller Rustom (2016), the dramas Jolly LLB 2 (2017), Toilet: Ek Prem Katha (2017) and Padman (2018), the sports film Gold (2018) and the war film Kesari (2019); for Rustom, he won the National Film Award for Best Actor. He hosted Dare 2 Dance in 2014 and debuted in Tamil cinema with a negative role in the expensive sci-fi extravaganza 2.0 (2018) which is the fifth highest-grossing Indian film. In 2019 he delivered four consecutive 200 Crore Club films with Mission Mangal, Housefull 4, Good Newwz, and Kesari and followed it up with further commercial success with the film Sooryavanshi (2021). This was followed by a career decline from 2022 to mid-2025, with the exception of OMG 2 (2023). He earned a nomination for Best Actor from Filmfare Awards for Sarfira (2024). Post mid-2025 he saw a slight career resurgence with the films Housefull 5 (2025) and Jolly LLB 3 (2025), both of which were moderately successful at the box office.

== Films ==
Key
†	Denotes films that have not yet been released

List of Akshay Kumar film credits
Year	Title	Role	Notes	Ref.
1987	Aaj	Karate instructor		
1991	Saugandh	Shiva Kirplani		
1991	Dancer	Raju		
1992	Mr. Bond	Mr. Bond		
1992	Khiladi	Raj Malhotra		
1992	Deedar	Anand Malhotra		
1993	Vishnu Vijaya	Vijay Roy	Kannada-Hindi bilingual film	
1993	Ashaant	Vijay Roy	Kannada-Hindi bilingual film	
1993	Dil Ki Baazi	Vijay Kashyap		
1993	Kayda Kanoon	Dawood Durani		
1993	Waqt Hamara Hai	Vikas Kumar Sabkuchwala		
1993	Sainik	Lieutenant. Suraj Dutt		
1994	Elaan	Vishal Chaudhary		
1994	Yeh Dillagi	Vijayendra "Vijay" Saigal	Nominated-Filmfare Award for Best Actor	
1994	Jai Kishen	Jai Verma / Kishen Verma (Note: Kumar played two characters.)		
1994	Mohra	Amar Saxena		
1994	Main Khiladi Tu Anari	Karan Joglekar		
1994	Ikke Pe Ikka	Rajiv		
1994	Amaanat	Amar Kumar		
1994	Suhaag	Raj Sinha		
1994	Zakhmi Dil	Jaidev Anand		
1994	Zaalim	Ravi Pratap		
1994	Hum Hain Bemisaal	Vijay Sinha		
1995	Paandav	Vijay Kumar		
1995	Maidan-E-Jung	Karan Singh		
1995	Nazar Ke Samne	Jai Kumar		
1995	Sabse Bada Khiladi	Vijay Kumar / Lallu		
1996	Tu Chor Main Sipahi	Amar Verma		
1996	Khiladiyon Ka Khiladi	Akshay Malhotra		
1996	Sapoot	Prem Singhania		
1997	Lahoo Ke Do Rang	Sikandar Davai		
1997	Insaaf	Vikram "Vicky" Singh Jain		
1997	Daava	Arjun Sarwar		
1997	Tarazu	Ram Yadav		
1997	Mr. and Mrs. Khiladi	Rajant "Raja" Kapoor (Mr. Khiladi)		
1997	Dil To Pagal Hai	Ajay Sahni	Nominated-Filmfare Award for Best Supporting Actor	
1997	Aflatoon	Rocky / Raja		
1998	Keemat	Dev		
1998	Angaaray	Amar Mehra		
1998	Barood	Jai Sharma		
1999	Aarzoo	Vijay Khanna		
1999	International Khiladi	Devraj Anand		
1999	Zulmi	Raj Malhotra		
1999	Sangharsh	Aman Verma		
1999	Jaanwar	Baadshah / Babu Lohaar		
2000	Hera Pheri	Raju		
2000	Dhadkan	Ram Verma	Nominated-Filmfare Award for Best Actor	
2000	Khiladi 420	Dev Kumar Malhotra / Anand Kumar Malhotra		
2001	Ajnabee	Vikram "Vicky" Bajaj	Won-Filmfare Award for Best Villain	
2001	Ek Rishtaa: The Bond of Love	Ajay Kapoor		
2002	Aadhar	Akshay, Jagdish's friend	Cameo; Marathi film	
2002	Haan Maine Bhi Pyaar Kiya	Raj Malhotra		
2002	Aankhen	Vishwas Prajapati		
2002	Awara Paagal Deewana	Guru Gulab Khatri		
2002	Jaani Dushman	Atul		
2003	Talaash	Arjun Raichand		
2003	Andaaz	Raj Malhotra	Nominated-Filmfare Award for Best Actor	
2004	Khakee	Senior Inspector Shekhar Verma	Nominated-Filmfare Award for Best Supporting Actor	
2004	Police Force	Vijay Singh		
2004	Aan: Men at Work	DCP Hari Om Pattnaik		
2004	Mujhse Shaadi Karogi	Arun "Sunny" Khanna	Nominated-Filmfare Award for Best Comedian & Best Supporting Actor	
2004	Hatya	Ravi Lal		
2004	Aitraaz	Raj Malhotra		
2004	Meri Biwi Ka Jawaab Nahin	Ajay Khanna		
2004	Ab Tumhare Hawale Watan Saathiyo	Rajeev Singh		
2005	Insan	Amjad Khan		
2005	Bewafaa	Raja Bhosle		
2005	Waqt	Aditya Thakur		
2005	Garam Masala	Makrand "Mac" Godbole	Won-Filmfare Award for Best Comedian	
2005	Deewane Huye Paagal	Ranbir "Rocky" Hiranadani		
2005	Dosti: Friends Forever	Raj Malhotra		
2006	Family	Shekhar Bhatia		
2006	Mere Jeevan Saathi	Vicky Bahl		
2006	Humko Deewana Kar Gaye	Aditya Malhotra		
2006	Phir Hera Pheri	Raju		
2006	Jaan-E-Mann	Agastya Rao		
2006	Bhagam Bhag	Bunty Rajkumar		
2007	Namastey London	Arjun Singh	Nominated-Filmfare Award for Best Actor	
2007	Heyy Babyy	Aarush Mehra		
2007	Bhool Bhulaiyaa	Aditya Shrivastava		
2007	Om Shanti Om	Himself	Special appearance	
2007	Welcome	Rajiv Saini		
2008	Tashan	Bachchan Pandey		
2008	Singh Is Kinng	Happy Singh	Nominated-Filmfare Award for Best Actor	
2008	Jumbo	Jaybir "Jumbo" Singh	Also narrator	
2009	Chandni Chowk to China	Sidhu / Sidhesh Sharma		
2009	8 x 10 Tasveer	Jai Puri / Jeet Puri		
2009	Kambakkht Ishq	Viraj Shergill		
2009	Blue	Aarav Malhotra		
2009	De Dana Dan	Nitin Bankar		
2010	Housefull	Aarush Awasthi		
2010	Khatta Meetha	Sachin Tichkule		
2010	Action Replayy	Kishen Kumar Chopra		
2010	Tees Maar Khan	Tabrez Mirza Khan / Tees Maar Khan		
2011	Patiala House	Parghat Singh "Gattu" Kahlon		
2011	Thank You	Kishen Khurana		
2011	Breakaway	Himself	Special appearance	
2011	Desi Boyz	Jignesh "Jerry" Patel / Rocco		
2011	Chalo Dilli	Lt. Col. Vikram Singh Rana	Cameo	
2012	Housefull 2	Sunny Pujari / Sunil		
2012	Rowdy Rathore	Shiva / ASP Vikram Singh Rathore		
2012	Joker	Rajkumar Joker Sattu / Agastya Sattu		
2012	OMG – Oh My God!	God Krishna Vasudev Yadav	Nominated-Filmfare Award for Best Supporting Actor	
2012	Khiladi 786	Bahattar Singh / Tehattar Singh		
2013	Bhaji in Problem	Bakshay	Special appearance; Punjabi film	
2013	Special 26	Ajay Singh Vardhan		
2013	Once Upon A Time in Mumbai Dobaara!	Shoaib Khan		
2013	Boss	Suryakant "Surya" Shastri / Boss		
2013	Bombay Talkies	Himself	Special appearance in the song "Apna Bombay Talkies"	
2014	Holiday	Captain Virat Bakshi	Nominated-Filmfare Award for Best Actor	
2014	Entertainment	Akhil Johri		
2014	The Shaukeens	Rajiv Bhatia		
2014	Fugly	Himself	Special appearance in the song "Fugly Fugly Kya Hai"	
2015	Baby	Ajay Singh Rajput		
2015	Gabbar Is Back	Professor Aditya "Gabbar" Singh Rajput		
2015	Brothers	David Fernandes		
2015	Singh Is Bling	Raftaar Singh		
2015	Hey Bro	Himself	Special appearance in the song "Birju"	
2016	Airlift	Ranjit Katyal		
2016	Housefull 3	Sanket "Sandy" Sehgal / Sundy		
2016	Dishoom	Sameer Gazi	Special appearance	
2016	Rustom	Rustom Pavri	Won-National Film Award for Best Actor & Nominated-Filmfare Award for Best Actor	
2017	Jolly LLB 2	Advocate Jagdishwar "Jolly" Mishra		
2017	Toilet: Ek Prem Katha	Keshav Sharma	Nominated-Filmfare Award for Best Actor	
2017	Naam Shabana	Ajay Singh Rajput	Special appearance	
2018	Pad Man	Lakshmi Kant Chauhan	Nominated-Filmfare Award for Best Actor	
2018	Gold	Tapan Das		
2018	2.0	Pakshi Rajan	Tamil film	
2018	Simmba	DCP Veer "Surya" Sooryavanshi	Cameo	
2019	Kesari	Havildar Ishar Singh	Nominated-Filmfare Award for Best Actor	
2019	Mission Mangal	Rakesh Dhawan		
2019	Housefull 4	Harry Sinha / Bala Dev Singh		
2019	Good Newwz	Varun Batra		
2019	Blank	Himself	Special appearance in the song "Ali Ali"	
2020	Laxmii	Asif Ahmed / Laxmii Sharma		
2021	Bell Bottom	Anshul Malhotra / Bell Bottom		
2021	Sooryavanshi	DCP Veer Sooryavanshi "Surya"		
2021	Atrangi Re	Sajjad Ali Khan		
2022	Bachchhan Paandey	Bachchan Pandey		
2022	Samrat Prithviraj	Samrat Prithviraj Chauhan		
2022	Raksha Bandhan	Lala Kedarnath Agarwal		
2022	Cuttputlli	SI Arjan Sethi		
2022	Ram Setu	Aryan Kulshrestha		
2022	An Action Hero	Himself	Cameo	
2023	Selfiee	Vijay Kumar		
2023	OMG 2	Lord Shiva		
2023	Mission Raniganj	Jaswant Singh Gill		
2024	Bade Miyan Chote Miyan	Captain Firoz "Freddy"		
2024	Sarfira	Vir Mhatre	Nominated-Filmfare Award for Best Actor	
2024	Khel Khel Mein	Rishabh Malik		
2024	Stree 2	Sarkata's descendant	Cameo	
2024	Singham Again	DCP Veer Sooryavanshi "Surya"	Cameo	
2025	Sky Force	Wing Commander Kumar Om Ahuja		
2025	Kesari Chapter 2	C. Sankaran Nair		
2025	Housefull 5	Julius "Jolly 3"		
2025	Kannappa	Shiva	Cameo; Telugu film	
2025	Jolly LLB 3	Advocate Jagdishwar "Jolly" Mishra		
2026	Bhooth Bangla	Arjun Acharya / Madhav Acharya (Vadhusur)	Also producer	
2026	Welcome to the Jungle	Rajiv Kohli / Vishwajit Kohli		
2026	Haiwaan	Parshuram Gokhale		
2026	Mauja Hi Mauja †	TBA	Filming	
2027	Vedat Marathe Veer Daudle Saat †	Chhatrapati Shivaji Maharaj	Post-production; Marathi film	
2027	Golmaal 5 †	TBA	Filming	
2027	Samuk †	Vivaan Ahuja	Filming	

== Television ==
List of Akshay Kumar television credits
Year	Title	Role	Notes	Ref.
2004	Seven Deadly Arts with Akshay Kumar	Host		
2008–2009, 2011	Fear Factor: Khatron Ke Khiladi	Host	Season 1, 2, 4	
2010	MasterChef India	Host	Season 1	
2012	MasterChef India	Himself	Season 2; Special appearance	
2013	Taarak Mehta Ka Ooltah Chashmah	Himself	Special appearance	
2014–2017	Jamai Raja	Producer		
2014	Dare 2 Dance	Host		
2017	The Great Indian Laughter Challenge	Judge		
2019	Fear Factor: Khatron Ke Khiladi 9	Himself	Guest	
2020	Into The Wild With Bear Grylls	Himself	Guest	
2022	India's Ultimate Warrior	Himself	Guest	
2026	Wheel of Fortune India	Himself	Host	
2026	Naagin 7	Naag Guru	Special appearance; episode 30	

== Music videos ==
List of Akshay Kumar music video credits
Year	Title	Role	Singer	Ref.
2019	"Filhall"	Dr. Kabir Malhotra	B Praak	
2020	"Muskurayega India"	Himself	Vishal Mishra	
2021	"Filhaal 2: Mohabbat"	Dr. Kabir Malhotra	B Praak	
2022	"Har Ghar Tiranga"	Himself	Asha Bhosle, Sonu Nigam, Devi Sri Prasad	
2023	"Kya Loge Tum"	Unnamed	B Praak	
2024	"Shambhu"	Unnamed	Akshay Kumar, Sudhir Yaduvanshi, Vikram Montrose	
