= Fadnavis ministry =

Devendra Fadnavis ministry may refer to these cabinets of Maharashtra, India headed by Devendra Fadnavis as chief minister:

- First Fadnavis ministry (31 October 2014 – 8 November 2019)
- Second Fadnavis ministry (23 November 2019 – 26 November 2019)
- Third Fadnavis ministry (05 December 2024 – present)

== See also ==
- Chief ministership of Devendra Fadnavis
