= Akshay Kumar =

Indian actor and film producer (born 1967)

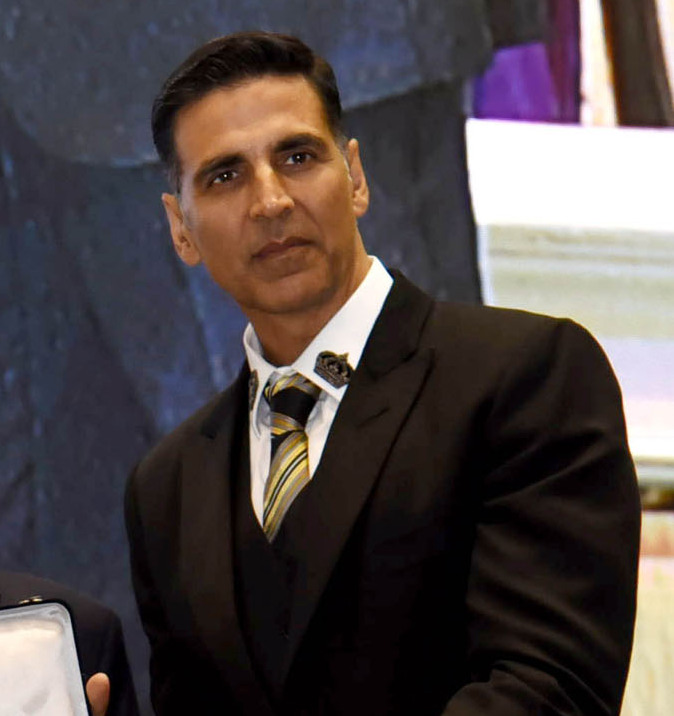
- Kumar in 2019
- Born: Rajiv Hari Om Bhatia; 9 September 1967 (age 59); Delhi, India
- Citizenship: India (1967–2011; 2023–present); Canada (2011–2023)
- Occupations: Actor; film producer
- Years active: 1991–present
- Works: Full list
- Spouse: Twinkle Khanna (m. 2001)
- Children: 2
- Relatives: Khanna family (by marriage)
- Awards: Full list
- Honours: Padma Shri (2009)

Signature
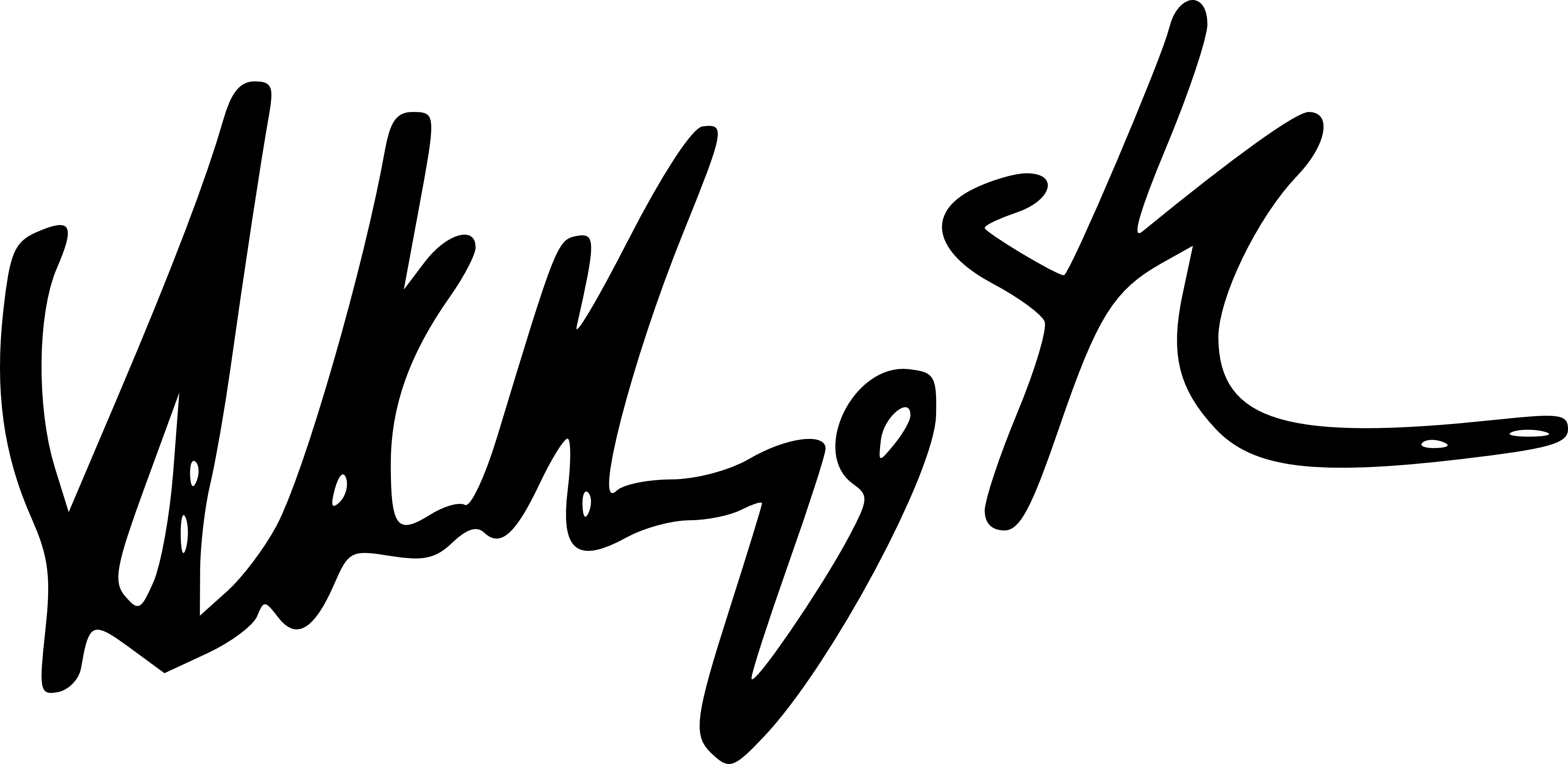

Akshay Hari Om Bhatia (born Rajiv Hari Om Bhatia; 9 September 1967), known professionally as Akshay Kumar (pronounced [əkˈʂəj kʊˈmaːɾ]), is an Indian actor and film producer working in Hindi cinema. Referred to in the media as "Khiladi Kumar", he is the recipient of several accolades, including two National Film Awards and two Filmfare Awards. In 2009, the Government of India awarded him the Padma Shri, India's fourth-highest civilian honour. One of the most prolific actors in Indian cinema, Kumar has appeared in over 150 films in a career spanning over three decades. Forbes included Kumar in their lists of both highest-paid celebrities and highest-paid actors in the world from 2015 to 2020. Between 2019 and 2020, he was the only Indian on both lists.

Kumar began his career in 1991 with Saugandh and had his first commercial success a year later with the action thriller Khiladi. The film established him as an action star in the 1990s and led to several films in the Khiladi film series, in addition to other action films such as Mohra (1994), Suhaag (1994), Sangharsh (1999), and Jaanwar (1999). Although his early tryst with romance in Yeh Dillagi (1994) was positively received, it was in the next decade that Kumar expanded his range of roles. He gained recognition for the romantic films Dhadkan (2000), Andaaz (2003), Aitraaz (2004), Namastey London (2007), and for his slapstick comic performances in several films including Hera Pheri (2000), Mujhse Shaadi Karogi (2004), Phir Hera Pheri (2006), Bhool Bhulaiyaa (2007), Welcome (2007), and Singh Is Kinng (2008). Kumar won Filmfare Awards for his negative role in Ajnabee (2001) and his comic performance in Garam Masala (2005).

While his career had fluctuated commercially, his mainstream success soared in 2007 with four consecutive box-office hits; it was consistent until a short period of decline. After which he reinforced his status with several films, including Rowdy Rathore (2012) and Holiday (2014). Moreover, around this time critical response to several of his films also improved; his work in OMG – Oh My God! (2012), Special 26 (2013), Baby (2015), Airlift (2016), and Jolly LLB 2 (2017) was acclaimed, and he won the National Film Award for Best Actor for the crime thriller Rustom (2016). He earned further notice for his self-produced social films Toilet: Ek Prem Katha (2017) and Pad Man (2018), and set box-office records in 2019 with Kesari, Mission Mangal, Housefull 4, Good Newwz, and the 2021 action film Sooryavanshi. Kumar suffered a career decline with many of his films post-Sooryavanshi failing at the box office, with major exceptions being OMG 2 (2023) and Bhooth Bangla (2026).

In addition to acting, Kumar has worked as a stunt actor. (Note: has often performed stunts in his films, which has earned him the sobriquet "Indian Jackie Chan".) In 2008, he started hosting Fear Factor: Khatron Ke Khiladi, which he did for four seasons. He also launched the TV reality show Dare 2 Dance in 2014 and his off-screen work includes ownership of the team Khalsa Warriors in the World Kabaddi League. The actor had also set up martial arts training schools for women's safety in the country. Kumar is one of India's most philanthropic actors and supports various charities. He is a brand endorser celebrity in India. From 2011 to 2023, he was a citizen of Canada. In 2021, Kumar was awarded the highest tax payer "Sanman Patra" for consecutively paying the highest tax as an individual for the past five years.

== Early life and background ==
Kumar was born on 9 September 1967 as Rajiv Hari Om Bhatia, in the Chandni Chowk area of Old Delhi, (Note: Though Britannica denotes his birthplace as Amritsar in Punjab, India.) into a Punjabi Hindu family, to parents Hari Om Bhatia (later Brijmohan Bhatia) hailing from Amritsar and Aruna Bhatia with roots in Kashmir. His father was an Indian Army officer. From a young age, Kumar was very interested in sports, and his father also enjoyed wrestling. He lived and grew up in Delhi's Chandni Chowk and later moved to Mumbai, when his father left the Army to become an accountant with UNICEF. Soon, his sister was born, and the family lived in Koliwada, a Punjabi dominated area of Central Bombay.

He received his school education from Don Bosco High School in Matunga, simultaneously learning Karate. He enrolled in the Guru Nanak Khalsa College of Arts, Science & Commerce of the University of Mumbai for higher education, but dropped out as he was not interested in studies. He requested his father to send him to Thailand to further learn martial arts. Kumar lived in Bangkok for five years, learning Thai Boxing. He also has a sister, Alka Bhatia. When Kumar was a teenager, he told his father that he wanted to become an actor. After obtaining a Black Belt in Taekwondo in India, he studied martial arts in Bangkok, learning Muay Thai, and worked as a chef and waiter.

After Thailand, Kumar worked in Calcutta (present-day Kolkata) in a travel agency, in Dhaka in a hotel as a chef, and in Delhi selling Kundan jewellery. Upon his return to Bombay, he started teaching martial arts. During this time, the father of one of his students recommended Kumar to modelling, which led to an assignment for a furniture showroom. Kumar worked as an assistant for photographer Jayesh Sheth for 18 months to create his first portfolio. He also worked as a background dancer in various films. Kumar made his first screen appearance in the film Aaj (1987) as a Karate instructor. He later adopted the stage name Akshay Kumar, inspired by Kumar Gaurav's character Akshay.

One morning, after missing a flight for an ad shoot in Bangalore, Kumar visited a film studio with his portfolio. That evening, he was signed for a lead role in the movie Deedar (1992) by producer Pramod Chakravarthy.

== Film career ==
=== 1991–1999: Breakthrough with action films ===
Kumar made his first appearance as the lead actor opposite Raakhee and Shantipriya in Saugandh (1991). In the same year, he acted in Kishore Vyas-directed Dancer, which received poor reviews. The following year he starred in Abbas Mustan-directed suspense thriller, Khiladi, widely considered his breakthrough role. A review in The Indian Express called the film "an engrossing thriller" and described Kumar as impressive in the lead part, noting his physical appearance, strong screen presence, and commending him for being "perfectly at ease". His next release was the Raj Sippy-directed detective film Mr. Bond, based on James Bond. His last release of 1992 was Deedar. It failed to perform well at the box office.

In 1993, he acted in the Keshu Ramsay-directed bilingual film Ashaant alongside Dr. Vishnuvardhan and Ashwini Bhave. Almost all of his films released during 1993, including Dil Ki Baazi, Kayda Kanoon and Sainik did not perform well commercially, with the exception of Waqt Hamara Hai which was considered a hit. In 1994, he appeared in 11 feature films. He played a police inspector in two films: Sameer Malkan's Main Khiladi Tu Anari and Rajiv Rai's Mohra, both among the highest-grossing films of the year. Further success came later that year when he starred in Yash Chopra-produced romance Yeh Dillagi, opposite Kajol. One of the year's biggest mainstream successes, both the film and his performance were received well by critics, with The Indian Express describing him as "always dependable" and singling out his performance. His work in the film earned him his first nomination for Best Actor at the Filmfare Awards and the Screen Awards. During the same year, Kumar also had success with films like Suhaag and the low-budget action film Elaan. All these achievements established Kumar as one of the most successful actors of the year, according to Box Office India.

Kumar proved to have success with what later became known as the Khiladi series. He starred in the fourth and fifth action thriller films with Khiladi in the title: Sabse Bada Khiladi (1995) and Khiladiyon Ka Khiladi (1996), both directed by Umesh Mehra and released to commercial success. He played a dual role in the former. Khiladiyon Ka Khiladi co-starred Rekha and Raveena Tandon. During the film's shooting Kumar was injured, and went on to receive treatment in the United States. Shubhra Gupta of The Indian Express wrote in a year-end review, "It was Akshay Kumar in Khiladiyon Ka Khiladi who packed the aisles, no doubt about it... He shoved his hair back in a slick little ponytail, much like Steven Seagal, wore ankle-length great coats, wrestled with the fearsome Undertaker, and walked away with the film."

Kumar played a supporting role in Yash Chopra-directed musical romantic drama, Dil To Pagal Hai (1997), co-starring Shah Rukh Khan, Madhuri Dixit and Karisma Kapoor, for which he received his first nomination for the Filmfare Award for Best Supporting Actor. In the same year, he starred opposite Juhi Chawla in David Dhawan-directed comedy Mr. and Mrs. Khiladi, fifth instalment of the Khiladi series. Unlike his previous films of the series, it failed commercially. Considerable success, however, came with another dual role in the romantic action film Aflatoon. Khalid Mohamed of Filmfare, while critical of the film, approved of Kumar's effort: "Akshay Kumar comes to life. Given something even slightly different to do, he does rise to the occasion." His following releases failed in commercial terms and this caused a setback to his film career. In 1999, Kumar played opposite Twinkle Khanna in International Khiladi. The film did not do well at the box office. He received critical acclaim for his roles in the films Sangharsh opposite Preity Zinta and Jaanwar opposite Karishma Kapoor. While the former did not make a profit at the box office, the latter turned out to be a commercial success and marked his comeback.

=== 2000–2011: Commercial success in comedy ===
In 2000, Kumar starred in the Priyadarshan-directed comedy Hera Pheri alongside Paresh Rawal and Suneil Shetty. The film which was a remake of Malayalam film Ramji Rao Speaking, became a commercial success and proved to be a turning point in Kumar's career. Hindustan Times noted the film's "intense portrayal of the surreality of the human condition". He also starred in the Dharmesh Darshan-directed romantic drama Dhadkan later that same year. The film performed moderately at the box office but Kumar was praised for his acting. Rediff.com's review stated that he had proved that he is "director's actor" and that "he has worked hard on his role is apparent." That same year, he performed some of his most dangerous stunts in Neeraj Vora-directed action thriller Khiladi 420, where he climbed a running plane, stood on top of the plane flying a thousand feet in the air, and jumped from the plane onto a hot air balloon. In a later scene, he is also seen being chased by a car, dodging bullets, jumping off buildings, and climbing walls. His character in the film had two names and his role received mixed reviews. Sukanya Verma wrote "Negative roles and Akshay Kumar don't go hand-in-hand. [...] Akshay is ridiculously over the top and irritating to the core. However, he manages a decent performance as the sober and suave Anand." Padmaraj Nair of Screen, however, believed it was "the best performance of his career".

His first release in 2001 was Suneel Darshan-directed drama Ek Rishtaa: The Bond of Love. Kumar was praised for his performance in the film. Next, he played a negative role in the Abbas Mustan-directed film Ajnabee. While reviewing the film for Rediff.com, Sarita Tanwar termed Kumar the "surprise package" of the film. She added that he was "in total control as the bad guy." The film won him his first Filmfare Award for Best Villain and IIFA award 2002 for Performance in a Negative Role.

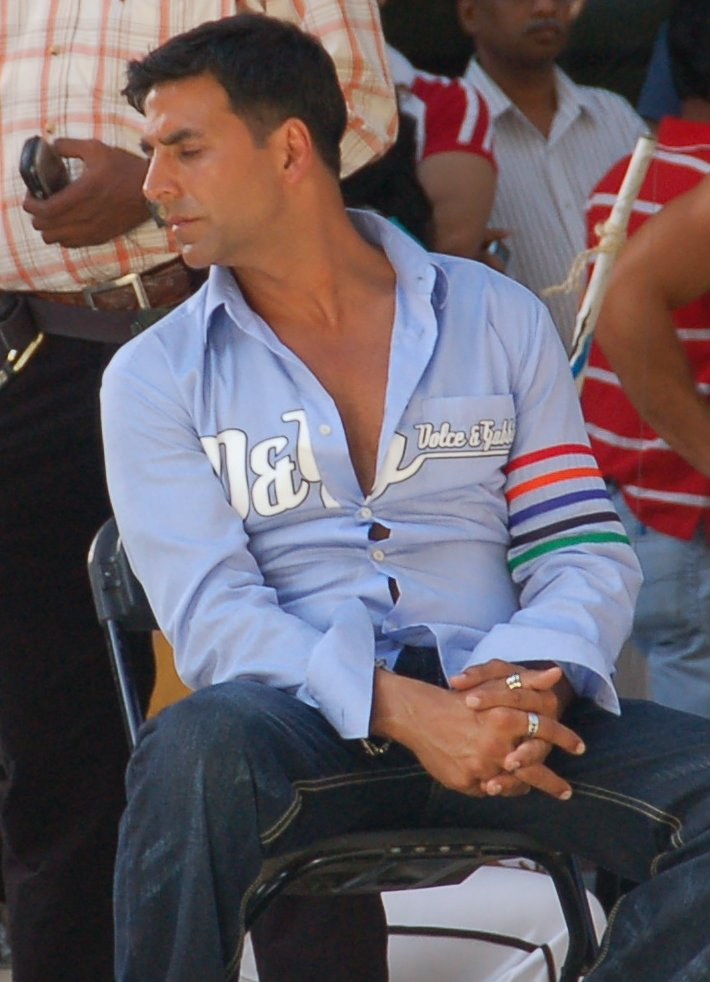
Kumar on the sets of Heyy Babyy in Sydney, 2007

His first release in 2002 was Dharmesh Darshan-directed romantic drama Haan Maine Bhi Pyaar Kiya. He played the role as a blind man in Vipul Amrutlal Shah and Shaarang Dev Pandit-directed heist film Aankhen, co-starring Amitabh Bachchan, Arjun Rampal, Aditya Pancholi, Sushmita Sen and Paresh Rawal. His performance in the film was critically acclaimed. Next, he starred in the Vikram Bhatt-directed comedy Awara Paagal Deewana. Rediff.com's review of the film mentioned that his sincerity and intensity seen in Hera Pheri, Ek Rishtaa – The Bond of Love and Aankhen "seems missing". His last film of the year was Rajkumar Kohli-directed supernatural horror film Jaani Dushman: Ek Anokhi Kahani alongside Manisha Koirala, Sunil Shetty, Sunny Deol, Aftab Shivdasani, Arshad Warsi, Aditya Pancholi and Armaan Kohli. The film was a remake of Kohli's former film Naagin and received mostly negative reviews from critics. Taran Adarsh wrote "only Munish[Armaan] Kohli and Akshay Kumar leave an impact." In 2003, he starred in Suneel Darshan's action film Talaash: The Hunt Begins... opposite Kareena Kapoor. While reviewing the film, Taran Adarsh wrote "Akshay Kumar is plain mediocre. The role hardly offers him scope to try out anything different." Next, he starred in Raj Kanwar-directed romantic drama Andaaz alongside Lara Dutta and Priyanka Chopra. The film received mixed reviews from critics, but turned out to be a commercial success at the box office and the first universal hit of 2003.

In 2004 Kumar starred in Rajkumar Santoshi's action drama thriller Khakee alongside Amitabh Bachchan, Ajay Devgn and Aishwarya Rai. Kumar played the role of Inspector Shekhar Verma, a corrupt, morally bankrupt cop who changes himself during a mission to transfer an accused Pakistani spy Dr. Iqbal Ansari (played by Atul Kulkarni) from a remote town in Maharashtra to Mumbai. The film and Kumar's acting were positively reviewed by critics. He was nominated for the Filmfare Award for Best Supporting Actor award for his role in the film. His other releases included Dileep Shukla's crime film Police Force: An Inside Story. He starred alongside Raveena Tandon, Amrish Puri and Raj Babbar. The film's production was delayed following the break-up of the lead actors Tandon and Kumar. Upon release it received negative reviews from critics. Next, Kumar played Hari Om Patnaik, an IPS officer in Madhur Bhandarkar-directed Aan: Men at Work. He starred in David Dhawan-directed romantic comedy Mujhse Shaadi Karogi alongside Salman Khan and Priyanka Chopra. He played the role of Sunny, Sameer (played by Khan)'s roommate who pursuits Rani (played by Chopra)-Sameer's love interest. The film received positive reviews. Taran Adarsh praised Kumar and wrote "Akshay Kumar is a revelation [...] he surpasses his previous work. His timing is fantastic and the conviction with which he carries off the evil streak in his personality is bound to be talked-about in days to come." His performance in the film earned him his third nomination for Best Supporting Actor at the Filmfare Awards as well as a nomination for Best Comic Role. His other films included Abbas-Mustan directed Aitraaz and S M Iqbal's Meri Biwi Ka Jawaab Nahin. In the former, Kumar played against type as a worker wrongly accused of sexual harassment by his female boss played by Chopra. According to the directors, Aitraaz was inspired by National Basketball Association player Kobe Bryant (who was accused of rape by a fan); and the film's development began when they read about his sexual-assault case in the newspapers. Talking about the character Kumar said that it is realistic and could be described as a "new-age metrosexual" man. He added that Aitraaz was the boldest film he had done. In the latter, he starred opposite Sridevi. The film was shot in 1994 but was released in 2004 after a delay of 10 years.

The next year Kumar starred in the Dharmesh Darshan-directed romantic drama musical film Bewafaa (2005) opposite Kareena Kapoor. He played the role of Raja, an aspiring musician who pursues his love interest Anjali (played by Kareena Kapoor) even after she marries Aditya Sahai (played by Anil Kapoor). The film received mixed reviews from film critic but Kumar was praised for his acting. Anupama Chopra of India Today wrote that "Kareena Kapoor and Kumar stand out." Taran Adarsh wrote "Akshay Kumar does well in a role that fits him like a glove." Later that year he acted in Vipul Amrutlal Shah's family drama Waqt: The Race Against Time alongside Amitabh Bachchan, another Priyadarshan-directed comedy Garam Masala alongside John Abraham. Waqt: The Race Against Time was a family drama film. The film and Kumar's acting received mixed reviews. Vishal D'Souza wrote "Akshay shoulders an author-backed role, carrying more of the film's emotional baggage though he is distinctly uncomfortable in the soppy-weepy scenes." The films succeeded at the box office and his performance in the latter earned him his second Filmfare Award, for Best Comedian. His other films included Vikram Bhatt-directed action comedy romance film Deewane Huye Paagal and Suneel Darshan directed romantic drama Dosti: Friends Forever. In the former he starred alongside Shahid Kapoor, Sunil Shetty and Rimi Sen while in the latter he starred alongside Kareena Kapoor and Bobby Deol. Both of these films received positive reviews.

Kumar's first release of 2006 was Rajkumar Santoshi-directed drama Family – Ties of Blood followed by Suneel Darshan's Mere Jeevan Saathi and Raj Kanwar's Humko Deewana Kar Gaye. Next, he starred in a sequel to Hera Pheri titled Phir Hera Pheri. As was the former, the sequel became a huge success at the box office. Later that year he starred alongside Salman Khan and Preity Zinta in the Shirish Kunder-directed romantic musical film Jaan-E-Mann. The film was a well anticipated release, and despite receiving positive reviews from critics, did not do as well as expected at the box office. The film received mostly negatively reviews. Vidya Pradhan of Rediff.com called it a "bizarre movie." Though the film under-performed, his role as a shy, lovable nerd was praised. He ended the year with Priyadarshan's comedy murder mystery film Bhagam Bhag. He starred alongside Lara Dutta, Govinda and Paresh Rawal and played the character of a theatre actor. The film received mixed reviews and Rediff.com called Kumar the real hero of the film. The film was commercially successful. The same year, he led the Heat 2006 world tour along with fellow stars Saif Ali Khan, Preity Zinta, Sushmita Sen and Celina Jaitley.

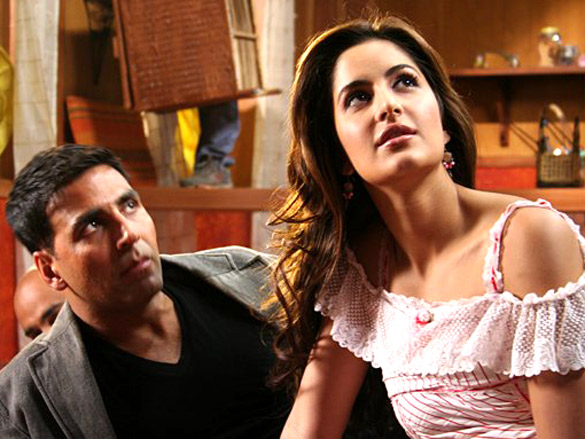
Kumar with Katrina Kaif on the sets of Welcome in 2007

2007 proved to be Kumar's most successful year during his career in the industry, and as described by box office analysts, "probably the best ever recorded by an actor, with four outright hits and no flops." His first release, Vipul Amrutlal Shah-directed Namastey London, was critically and commercially successful, and his performance earned him a Best Actor nomination at the Filmfare. Critic Taran Adarsh wrote of his performance in the film, "he's sure to win the hearts of millions of moviegoers with a terrific portrayal in this film." Kumar's chemistry with lead actress Katrina Kaif also generated immense appreciation, with Nikhat Kazmi of The Times of India describing their pairing as "refreshing." His next two releases, Sajid Khan-directed Heyy Babyy and Priyadarshan's Bhool Bhulaiyaa, were box office successes as well. In both of these films he starred opposite Vidya Balan. Kumar's last release of the year, the Anees Bazmee-directed Welcome, did extremely well at the box office, receiving a blockbuster status and simultaneously becoming his fifth successive hit. All of Kumar's films which released that year did well in the overseas market as well. Kumar appeared in a cameo role in Farah Khan directed Om Shanti Om. His role was listed as no. 3 on the Top 10 Cameos in Bollywood list of MensXP.com.

Kumar's first film of 2008, Vijay Krishna Acharya-directed action thriller Tashan, marked his comeback to the Yash Raj Films banner after 11 years. Although a poll (conducted by Bollywood Hungama) named it the most anticipated release of the year, the film under-performed at the box office grossing ₹279 million (US$5.76 million) in India. His second film, Bazmee-directed Singh Is Kinng in which he starred opposite Kaif was a huge success at the box office and broke the first-week worldwide record of Om Shanti Om, the previous highest figure. His next film was the animated film Jumbo, directed by Kompin Kemgumnird. The year also saw Kumar making his small screen debut as the host of the successful show Fear Factor – Khatron Ke Khiladi. He later returned to host the show's second season in 2009.

In 2009, Kumar featured opposite Deepika Padukone in the Warner Bros. and Rohan Sippy production Chandni Chowk to China. Directed by Nikhil Advani, the film was a critical and commercial failure at the box office. Kumar's next release was 8 x 10 Tasveer, an action-thriller directed by Nagesh Kukunoor that failed commercially. His next release was Sabbir Khan's battle-of-the-sexes comedy Kambakkht Ishq. Set in Los Angeles, it was the first Indian film to be shot at Universal Studios and featured cameo appearances by Hollywood actors. The film was poorly received by critics but became an economic success, earning over ₹840 million (US$17.35 million) worldwide. Kumar's film Blue was released on 16 October 2009. Blue received negative reviews and collected about ₹ 420 million at the box office. His last release in 2009 was Priyadarshan's De Dana Dan. He starred alongside Katrina Kaif, Suniel Shetty and Paresh Rawal. Kumar played a servant who plans to kidnap his owner's dog. The film received mixed reviews.

He then appeared in the 2010 comedy, Housefull, directed by Sajid Khan which garnered the second-highest opening weekend collection of all time. Kumar's next release was Khatta Meetha, directed by Priyadarshan which was an average grosser. The film received negative reviews. Rajeev Masand of CNN-IBN called it a schizophrenic film. He also appeared in Vipul Shah's Action Replayy, which was a box office failure. The film received mostly negative reviews. His last film of 2010 was Tees Maar Khan. Directed by Farah Khan, the film received poor critical reviews but became moderately successful.

In 2011 he starred in Patiala House and Thank You. His last film of 2011 was Rohit Dhawan-directed Desi Boyz (2011), which co-starred John Abraham, Chitrangada Singh and Deepika Padukone. He also co-produced a film with Russell Peters titled Breakaway (dubbed into Hindi as Speedy Singhs) which is reminiscent of his own Patiala House. Breakaway became the highest-grossing cross-cultural movie of 2011 in Canada. Kumar dubbed for the role of Optimus Prime in the Hindi version of Hollywood, action blockbuster, Transformers: Dark of the Moon. He took the dubbing role for his son, Aarav, and did so for free.

=== 2012–2021: Commercial peak ===
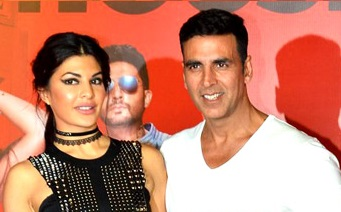
Kumar with his Housefull film series co-star Jacqueline Fernandez at the launch of the song "Taang Uthake" of Housefull 3 in 2016

His first release of 2012 was Housefull 2, a sequel of his earlier comedy film Housefull, which became a huge hit. Kumar's next film was the Prabhudeva-directed action drama Rowdy Rathore in which he played a double role opposite Sonakshi Sinha. The film earned more than ₹1.3 billion (US$24.33 million) in India. Both of these films grossed over ₹1 billion (US$18.71 million) at the box office. In 2012, he founded another production company called Grazing Goat Pictures Pvt Ltd.

Joker was reportedly promoted as Kumar's 100th film, but later Akshay Kumar clarified that the 100th film landmark had been crossed long before he even signed up for Joker. "It was a miscalculation on Shirish's part. OMG is my 116th film," he said. Kumar kept himself away from the film's promotion due to differences with Kunder. Reacting to Kumar's backing out from the film's promotion Kunder tweeted "A true leader takes responsibility for his team and leads them through thick and thin. Never abandons them and runs away." He later deleted the tweet. His later release Oh My God which he produced and starred along with Paresh Rawal. It had a slow opening, but because of positive word of mouth it picked up and emerged a superhit at the box office. His last release in 2012 was Khiladi 786, the eighth instalment in his famous Khiladi series as well as the comeback of the series after 12 years. Although film was panned by critics, it grossed 970 million worldwide.

His first release in 2013 was Special 26 which earned a positive critical reception and was semi-hit at the box office. Although the movie earned him positive reviews and commercial success, trade analysts noted that the movie could have done much better business due to its good content and Kumar's high-profile. Milan Luthria chose Kumar to play the character of Shoaib Khan (based on Dawood Ibrahim) in the gangster film Once Upon ay Time in Mumbai Dobaara!, sequel to Once Upon a Time in Mumbaai. It proved to be a below average at the box office. The film was declared a "flop" by Box Office India. It received mixed reviews however Kumar's acting was praised by a majority of critics. In a review for Hindustan Times, Anupama Chopra wrote that Kumar "makes a stellar killer". Madhureeta Mukherjee of The Times of India praised Kumar's performance and said that "Bhai act with flamboyance and mojo ... He gets a chance to do what he does best – herogiri (albeit less menacing, more entertaining), with charisma and clap-trap dialoguebaazi." Al Pacino saw the film's trailer and promos and admired Kumar's portrayal of Shoaib Khan, a gangster. He said that the promos and posters reminded him of his own The Godfather. Kumar said of Pacino's response: "A touch of appreciation is always held dearly in an actor's arms, even if it's from the simplest of people like our beloved spot boys. But to have your work spoken of so kindly by the world's most admired gangster Al Pacino himself – I had goose-bumps thinking about him watching the promo! I was so humbled, not only as an actor but as a fan of his legendary work." Rajeev Masand of CNN-IBN criticised Kumar for his "in-your-face flamboyance". After the film's mainly negative reviews, Kumar lashed out at critics, accusing them of lacking an understanding of the audience and the basic ideas of filmmaking. Built on an approximate budget of ₹1 billion (US$18.71 million), it was the first major Hindi language film to be shot in Oman. Kumar received a nomination for Best Actor in a Negative Role at Zee Cine Awards.

His next release was Anthony D Souza's Boss alongside Shiv Panditt and Aditi Rao Hydari. The movie received mixed reviews; it performed poorly at the box office netting ₹540 million (equivalent to ₹940 million or US$10 million in 2026) domestically. Kumar came back strongly with Holiday: A Soldier Is Never Off Duty, the Hindi remake of the 2012 Tamil film Thuppakki. This action thriller earned both critical and commercial success entering the ₹1 billion (US$16.39 million) elite club and emerging one of the highest grossers of 2014. He then starred in Entertainment and has sung a song for the film. Making of the song has been uploaded on YouTube. His last film of 2014 was The Shaukeens. He appeared as himself in it and produced it. He then played the lead role in the thrillers Baby and Gabbar is Back. Kumar's first collaboration with Karan Johar, Brothers was released on 14 August 2015. His next release was Singh is Bling, a quasi sequel to 2008's Singh is Kinng was released on 2 October 2015 and is produced by Grazing Goats Pictures.

His first release was Airlift released on 22 January 2016 was critically and commercially successful, and second was Housefull 3 which released on 3 June 2016. Rustom which was produced by Neeraj Pandey and marked his third release of 2016. Akshay was praised for his performance in Rustom which garnered him numerous award nominations. Rustom grossed more than 2 billion at the box office. Both Airlift and Rustom earned him the National Film Award for Best Actor.

His second film release in 2017 was Toilet: Ek Prem Katha. This film depicted the serious social issue of toilets in certain regions of the country. Akshay's performance was praised. Akshay Kumar dug a toilet in Madhya Pradesh to promote the film. The movie trailer was released on 11 June 2017. Indian Prime Minister Narendra Modi called it a good effort to further the message of cleanliness, as per Swachh Bharat Abhiyan.

In 2018, Akshay starred in another social drama film Pad Man alongside Sonam Kapoor and Radhika Apte. He later made his Tamil cinema debut in the science fiction thriller 2.0, a standalone sequel to the 2010 film Enthiran, co-starring Rajinikanth, in which he played an evil ornithologist named Pakshirajan.

In 2019, Kumar appeared in Karan Johar's film Kesari opposite Parineeti Chopra, based on the story of the Battle of Saragarhi. The film grossed over ₹2 billion (US$28.4 million) worldwide. He next featured in Mission Mangal with an ensemble cast of Vidya Balan, Taapsee Pannu, Nithya Menen, Sharman Joshi and Sonakshi Sinha. The film is about the story of scientists at Indian Space Research Organisation who contributed to the Mars Orbiter Mission, which marked India's first interplanetary expedition. Housefull 4, directed by Farhad Samji, was released in October 2019. His next release in December 2019 was Karan Johar's and his own production Good Newwz, a romantic comedy about surrogacy, opposite Kareena Kapoor Khan. All of his four films were commercially successful this year with three consecutive domestic 2 billion Club net films alongside Mission Mangal, Housefull 4 and Good Newwz.

His only release in 2020 was the horror comedy Laxmii, directed by Raghava Lawrence, an official remake of the Tamil film Kanchana opposite Kiara Advani. It was released on 9 November on Disney+ Hotstar, and was not released theatrically in India due to the COVID-19 pandemic. The film revolves around a man who gets possessed by the ghost of a transgender. Despite receiving mixed to negative reviews from critics, it was popular on both OTT as well as television, eventually emerging the only genuine hit to be premiered on digital.

Kumar's first release of 2021, Bell Bottom, which released during the second wave of COVID-19 did not perform well commercially, but his second release, Rohit Shetty's actioner Sooryavanshi proved to be a box office hit and was credited with reviving the exhibition sector for Hindi cinema post COVID-19 pandemic in India. Towards the end of year, he co-starred alongside Dhanush and Sara Ali Khan in Aanand L. Rai's direct-to-digital romantic comedy film Atrangi Re. At release, Atrangi Re garnered the highest opening day viewership in their streaming service, thereby breaking the viewership records of Laxmii (2020), Hungama 2 (2021) and Shiddat (2021).

=== 2022–present: Career fluctuations and occasional success ===
In 2022, Kumar's first release was Bachchhan Paandey, a remake of Jigarthanda, where he played the titular role of a gangster, a name derived from Kumar's character in the 2008 film Tashan. The film paired him with Kriti Sanon, and also features Jacqueline Fernandez and Arshad Warsi. Despite an ensemble cast and hype among fans, Bachchhan Paandey gathered negative critical reception and bombed at the box office. His next release was the historical film Samrat Prithviraj, which was based on life of the Hindu warrior Prithviraj Chauhan. It also starred Sonu Sood, Sanjay Dutt and debutant Manushi Chhillar. Released theatrically on 3 June 2022, the film opened to mixed reviews. Anuj Kumar of The Hindu wrote 'To tone down his body language and accent, Kumar has lost much of his trademark energy and could not develop the gravitas required to play the celebrated ruler. He growls like a lion who has lost his bite and despite all the air-brushing, doesn't look like the boy who became a Samrat in his 20s'. Made on a budget of ₹200 crore, the film failed to recoup the massive investment and proved to be a disaster at the box office.

His next movie Rakshabandhan which was released on the extended weekend of 5 days on 11 August received mixed reviews. The Hindu wrote "The film's engaging powerful anti-dowry sentiments, along with Akshay's brilliant comic timing, ensures that there is enough to keep the audience tied for two hours." The Indian Express rated the film 1.5 out of 5 stars and wrote "Do the filmmakers truly believe that such low-rent family dramas, with their uneasy mix of humour and crassness". The film couldn't manage to impress the audience and scored poorly at the Indian ticket windows. The film managed to earn mere $4.2 million over the extended weekend. The Hindustan Times wrote "Akshay Kumar got a golden opportunity in the film Ram Setu by Abhishek Sharma released on 25 October 2022, as his character is unlike anything he has done in the recent past. Ram Setu embraces the best of the Indiana Jones and National Treasure schools of storytelling with desi action". With the poor performance of Ram Setu, 2022 proved to be one of the worst years for Kumar in recent times.

His first release of 2023 was Selfiee, an official remake of Driving Licence, which also starred Emraan Hashmi, Diana Penty and Nushrratt Bharuccha. This film too bombed at the box office. Kumar next appeared in OMG 2 – Oh my God 2, a spiritual successor to OMG – Oh My God!, where he played a messenger of Lord Shiva. Ganesh Aaglave of Firstpost stated, "Akshay's character as the messenger of Lord Shiva seems to be an extended cameo. However, the actor impresses with his expressions and dialogues and delivers one of his best performances in recent times." The film became a box office hit. Kumar next appeared opposite Parineeti Chopra as Jaswant Singh Gill, a brave and diligent mining engineer in the disaster thriller Mission Raniganj. It received mixed to positive response from critics, but flopped miserably at the box office.

His first release of 2024 was Ali Abbas Zafar's actioner Bade Miyan Chote Miyan co-starring Tiger Shroff. Made at a budget of ₹3.50 billion, the film opened to largely negative reviews from critics and did a lifetime business of ₹1021.6 million at the worldwide box-office, thus proving to be a disaster and continuing the string of flops for Kumar. He was next seen in Sarfira alongside Radhika Madan. The movie was a remake of the Tamil hit Soorarai Pottru, which itself was an adaptation of Air Deccan founder G. R. Gopinath's memoir Simply Fly: A Deccan Odyssey. The remake performed poorly at the box-office, collecting just ₹200 million against a budget of ₹800 million. However his performance was praised as he went on to earn a nomination for Best Actor at the 70th Filmfare Awards. Following this, Kumar played a cosmetic surgeon in Khel Khel Mein alongside Vaani Kapoor. Sukanya Verma noted, "The chemistry between the motley bunch of actors works in fits and starts but Akshay Kumar's gift of the gab come out tops." Despite positive reviews, it emerged another commercial failure for him. Kumar then reprised his character from Sooryavanshi in Singham Again. His cameo was well received but the film was a commercial disappointment. Yet, it was one of the highest-grossing film of the year.

Kumar's career saw a resurgence post mid-2025, when his last 2 films of the year performed decently at the box office, though his first 2 films of the year were unprofitable at the box office despite positive critical and audience reception. His first release came with Sky Force, based on India's first airstrike during the Sargodha Airbase attack in the 1965 Indo-Pakistani war. This marked his second collaboration with Maddock Films following Stree 2. Pragati Awasthi of WION wrote "the aura and energy he brings to his character always manages to capture viewer attention. While his performance isn't extraordinary, he still manages to make the audience feel emotional with his poignant scenes." Despite positive reviews, the film wasn't profitable at the box office due to its high budget. Following this, Kumar played advocate C. Sankaran Nair in Kesari Chapter 2, which is set against the backdrop of the Jallianwala Bagh massacre in 1919. Titas Chowdhury stated, "Akshay Kumar sheds off his aura as a superstar and chooses to lean on his acting prowess, taking it a notch higher than Sarfira." The film, like Sky Force, wasn't profitable commercially due to its high budget despite positive reviews. Kumar next played one of the primary character in Housefull 5 opposite Nargis Fakhri and Jacqueline Fernandez. The film was released in two versions, titled Housefull 5A and Housefull 5B, each featuring a different climax and murderer. Rishabh Suri opined: "Akshay knows exactly what's expected of him. This is classic Akshay comedy territory, and he makes even the flat writing work." A moderate commercial success and his first profitable film since OMG 2, it emerged as one of the highest-grossing films of the year. Kumar then portrayed Lord Shiva opposite Kajal Aggarwal in a cameo appearance in the Telugu film Kannappa, which bombed at the box office. In his last release of the year Jolly LLB 3, Kumar reprised his role of an advocate from Jolly LLB 2 alongside Arshad Warsi, who reprised his role from Jolly LLB. Vineeta Kumar of India Today noted, "Akshay is a delight to watch. His sharp one-liners land effortlessly." The film emerged as yet another moderate commercial success and one of the highest-grossing film of the year. In 2026, Kumar started in the horror-comedy film Bhooth Bangla, which was directed by Priyadarshan. The film received mixed reviews but became Kumar's first clean hit since OMG 2, grossing over ₹2.47 billion at the worldwide box office against a budget of ₹1.20 billion. He also acted in another Priyadarshan-directed film in the same year, Haiwaan, which was panned upon release and bombed at the box office.

== Other work ==
=== Television ===
In 2004, Kumar presented seven-part miniseries Seven Deadly Arts with Akshay Kumar for free, played master and learner as he introduces viewers to each of the seven part of martial arts-kalaripayattu, Shaolin Kung Fu, karate, taekwondo, aikido, Muay Thai, capoeira, the show aired on every following Sunday. The following year Kumar was awarded the highest Japanese honour of "Katana" and a sixth degree black belt in Kuyukai Gōjū-ryū karate.

Since 2008, Kumar started India's stunt/action reality game show, Fear Factor: Khatron Ke Khiladi. He hosted the first season, second season and fourth season. The show was widely accepted and appreciated, became hugely successful in popular culture. It is still being run by Rohit Shetty.

In 2011, Kumar hosted India's first MasterChef television show on Star Plus, was viewed by 18.2 million viewers and went to prove that Indian audiences are open to experimenting and look forward to innovations in television entertainment.

In 2014, he hosted another reality show Dare 2 Dance as a mentor, which aired on Life OK from 6 September. It broke the norms of a regular dance format with a commitment of a 'first of its kind. A dance show where trained and famed dancers wasn't judged only on the basis of their dance performances, but they had to perform stunts.survive on the dance floor.

In 2014, Kumar also produced a successful television serial Jamai Raja (2014), starring Ravi Dubey and Nia Sharma, which established them leading actors in Indian television industry.

In 2017, he judged The Great Indian Laughter Challenge with Mallika Dua, Hussain Dalal and Zakir Khan, who were later replaced by Sajid Khan and Shreyas Talpade. The show made many popular names including Vishwash Chauhan and Shyam Rangeela.

Kumar joined Bear Grylls for an episode, "Into The Wild", which aired on Discovery channel on 14 September 2020. The episode was second highest-rated show in the infotainment genre (Discovery Channel) in terms of TRP. 11 million people watched the premiere on Discovery Network channels.

In October 2025, Kumar will appear as an investor and mentor on Pitch to Get Rich, a fashion-focused reality series produced by Jio Studios, Dharmatic Entertainment, and the Fashion Entrepreneur Fund.

In January 2026, he appeared as the host of the Indian version of American's gameshow Wheel of Fortune produced by Sony Entertainment Television.

=== Fitness work and stage performances ===
Kumar promotes health fitness and exercising, stays in shape with a combination of kickboxing, basketball, swimming and Parkour as well as working out. While in standard eighth he had started practising Karate. He intended to open a martial arts school and the state government of Maharashtra allotted land for the school in Bhayandar.

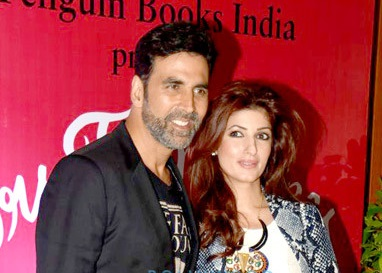
Kumar with his wife Twinkle Khanna at the launch of Khanna's book Mrs Funnybones in 2015

He helped Khanna with editing the drafts of her debut book Mrs Funnybones. He is a teetotaller but has endorsed for a liquor brand in the past. Half of the sum was given for daan (charity work), of which he has been doing more of in recent times. In 2013, one of his fan travelled from Haryana to Mumbai, to meet him. The journey took him 42 days. When he reached Kumar's building, he was informed that Kumar was in Casablanca. The fan stayed outside the building for one week before Kumar met him. Kumar has come out in support and lauded the Sports Minister Rajyavardhan Singh Rathore for his stand against corruption. The minister said that the government entrusted CBI in the investigation against the corrupt officials in sports department.

On 9 August 2014, Kumar performed at his 500th live show. The show was held in O2 Arena in London as part of the inaugural function of the World Kabaddi League. His first live show was held in 1991 in Delhi. Kumar owns Bengal Warriors a team in the Indian Kabaddi League. In 2019, Akshay Kumar set himself on fire at the launch of his then-upcoming series The End with Prime Video, where he said that "he's a stuntman first and actor later". However, the series was indefinitely delayed.

== Personal life ==
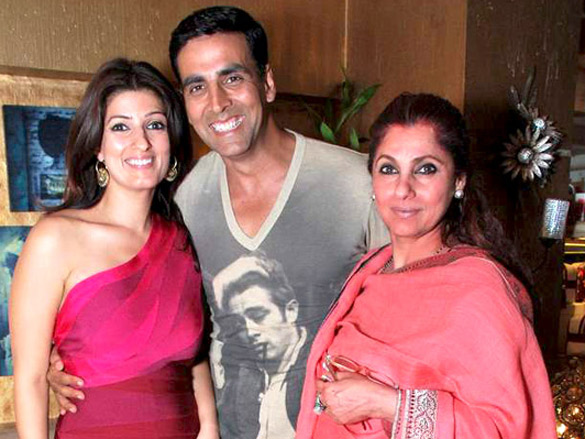
Kumar with his wife Twinkle Khanna and mother-in-law Dimple Kapadia in 2014

=== Relationships ===
During the late 1990s, Kumar was in a relationship with actress Raveena Tandon. Despite being engaged, they parted ways. In a 1998 interview with Rediff, Kumar had admitted to having been engaged to Tandon while also claiming that they had never married. In another interview with actor Simi Garewal on her chat show, Tandon accused Kumar of cheating and of improper behaviour. Now Kumar and Tandon are said to be sharing normal relations.

Later from 1997 to 2000, Kumar was in another much talked after relationship with actress Shilpa Shetty, with whom also he had worked together in many films. Later it had led to an ugly break-up. This is said to have severely strained the relationship between Shetty and Raveena Tandon. Later, Shetty publicly accused Kumar of cheating on her. In an interview in 2000, Shetty is alleged to have said, "I never imagined that he could two-time me. There is no point blaming any other woman, it was entirely his fault." She is also said to have alleged that he dumped her for Twinkle Khanna, whom he later married. Kumar is said to have denied these allegations saying that Shetty should not have made such accusations. Now, Kumar and Shetty are said to have patched up the matter.

=== Marriage and family ===
Kumar met actress Twinkle Khanna, the daughter of actors Rajesh Khanna and Dimple Kapadia, during a photo session for Filmfare magazine. Kumar married Khanna on 17 January 2001. Together have a son (Aarav, born 2002) and a daughter (Nitara, born 2012). He is known as a protective father and keeps his children away from the media. He stated that he wants to "give them a normal childhood." Kumar often credits Khanna for his success.

In 2009, while performing at a show for Levi's at Lakme Fashion Week, Kumar asked Twinkle to unbutton his jeans. This incident sparked a controversy which led to a police case being filed against them.

=== Religion ===
Kumar was initially religious, till 2017 being a practising Shaiva Hindu who regularly visited shrines and temples across the country, including the famed Vaishno Devi Mandir, while in 2018 he said "there is only one God" and was against bringing religion into politics, but in March 2020 he stated, "I don't believe in any religion. I only believe in being Indian".

=== Citizenship ===
Sometime during or after the 2011 Canadian federal election, the Conservative government there granted Canadian citizenship to Kumar by invoking a little-known law which allowed circumventing the usual residency requirement for Canadian immigrants. According to a former Conservative Party minister, Tony Clement, the citizenship was awarded in return for Kumar's offer of putting his "star power to use to advance Canada-Indian relations," and Canada's "trade relations, commercial relations, in the movie sector, in the tourism sector." Although Kumar had earlier appeared in a campaign event for Conservative Prime Minister Stephen Harper in Brampton, Ontario, a city with a large Indo-Canadian population, and praised Harper, Clement denied that the citizenship was a reward for partisan support. Kumar had received an honorary doctorate degree from the University of Windsor, and in a 2010 interview with the Economist claimed he had "dual citizenship." He was one of the 15 international celebrities invited for the Olympics torch-bearer rally to Canada.

In December 2019, Kumar stated that he had applied for an Indian passport and planned to give up his Canadian citizenship. On 15 August 2023, on the occasion of Independence Day, Kumar confirmed he had regained his Indian citizenship and renounced his Canadian citizenship as required by Indian law.

== In the media ==
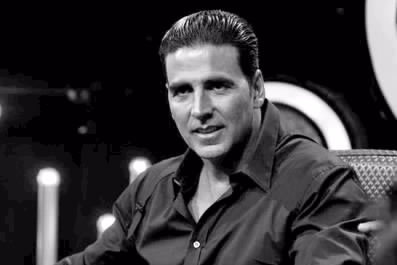
Kumar in 2013

In Indian Media, Kumar is referred as Khiladi or Khiladi Kumar for doing so many dangerous stunts by himself and also because of his Khiladi film series. In 2009, Madame Tussauds wanted to make his wax figure next because he has an international fan following. But he declined and a source close to him said,"Akshay does not want to be waxed because he does not think it is of that great importance". From 2015, he was continuously featured in Forbes's highest paid actors top 10 list. In 2019, he was fourth highest paid actor in the world behind Dwayne Johnson, Chris Hemsworth and Robert Downey Jr. On the Forbes US list of World's 33rd Highest Earner with $65M. In 2020, he ranked sixth and only Indian actor in top 10 of highest paid actors list with $48.5M. Kumar is the first Indian film actor, whose films' domestic net lifetime collections crossed ₹20 billion (US$341.31 million) by 2013, and ₹30 billion (US$446.46 million) by 2016.

Kumar was named "Sexiest Man Alive" by People Magazine in 2008. Kumar was awarded with NDTV Imagine Best Entertainer of the Year 2007 by the Apsara Film & Television Producers Guild Awards (FTPGI). In 2009, he was awarded the highest Japanese honour of "Katana" and a sixth degree Black Belt in Kuyukai Gojuryu Karate. He was one of the 15 international celebrities invited for the Olympics torch-bearer rally to Canada in 2009. Kumar bagged the Ultimate "Man of the Year" at the prestigious GQ Awards in 2015. He won the HT Hottest Trendsetter (Male) award at the HT India's Most Stylish in 2019.

Kumar has great brand value and holds strong credibility in the advertising world. In 2020, Kumar has topped the list with brand value of $118M he has seen a jump of 13% by previous years. According to Duff and Phelps, Kumar was third most valued celebrity with $139M in 2021. Kumar has endorsed brands including Thums Up, Honda, Tata Motors, Dollar, Harpic, Sparx, Livguard Battery, and Kajarai Tiles. He was also brand ambassador of Canada Tourism. Kumar ranked number 1 on TAM's list of most visible stars in TV ads with an average visibility of 37 hours per day across all channels since 2019 to 2022.

Kumar has significant fan following in Indian diaspora as well as in European and African countries. As of September 2022, he is the most followed Indian actor on social media including Facebook, Twitter and Instagram. Memes from his comedy movies, especially his face expressions are hugely popular on social media. In 2019, Kumar interviewed Narendra Modi on TV, which concluded as controversies in social media, later he clarified that it was a personal interview as a common man, not political. Since 2013, Kumar has been the Hindi film industry's highest advance taxpayer for six consecutive years. He paid ₹190 million (US$3.24 million) as advance tax payment in that year. In August 2022, he received a certificate from the Income Tax department for being highest tax payer. Kumar has criticised award functions and doesn't believe in it saying, "It happens sometimes that the people from the award night call you and tell you that if you perform then they can give half the money and give an award as well. I tell them that they can give me complete payment and keep their awards with them". He called National Film Award, most prestigious award of the country.

Kumar holds the Guinness World Records for the most 184 Selfies taken in three minutes at a promotional event of his film Selfiee in Mumbai. He talked to the media and termed it as a 'way of paying tribute' to his fans. In March 2023, Kumar performed in various cities in the United States for "The Entertainers" tour, alongside Disha Patani, Mouni Roy, Nora Fatehi, Sonam Bajwa, Aparshakti Khurana, Stebin Ben and Zahrah S Khan.

== Philanthropy and social service ==
Kumar at Road Safety Awareness Program on 14 August 2018 in New Delhi

Kumar is one of India's most philanthropic celebrities, does a lot of helps and donations, continues the good work offscreen with his philanthropy and services. He and his co-star Tamannaah Bhatia donated all the clothes from their film 2014 Entertainment to an animal welfare charity. Youth Organisation in Defence of Animals (YODA) is an organisation which works for the welfare of street animals. He has also donated ₹5 million (US$93,567.08) to Salman Khan's Being Human Foundation. Kumar also had donated a sum of ₹9 million to drought hit farmers in Maharashtra in 2015, Khan himself tweeted on Twitter. Kumar also helped a contestant of TV reality show Khatron Ke Khiladi by giving him Rs. 2.5 million after knowing that the contestant needed the prize money of the show for his father's cancer treatment. He has also donated ₹5 million to aid drought affected people through the Maharashtra government's Jalyukt Shivar Abhiyan. In March 2013, he started a 30-bed cancer shelter for policemen in Naigaon. In December 2013, Vishwas Nangre Patil, Additional Commissioner of Police, West Mumbai visited his gym along with several trainee officers. Acid attack survivor Laxmi Agarwal, on whose life Deepika Padukone's Chapaak was based is also an activist. Some years ago, she was struggling to make ends meet. Kumar came to her rescue and transferred Rs. 500,000 into her account so that she could fend for herself until she found a job, because medals, awards and certificates don't pay the bills.

He launched an insurance scheme for the registered stunt directors in 2017. The family of deceased stunt director Abdul Sattar Munna has received a compensation of Rs. 2 million under the same scheme. Now, the actor has been asked to help those stunt choreographers who are above 55 years of age and therefore, aren't eligible to have insurance in their name.

During the promotions of Rustom, Kumar expressed his wish of serving the nation but destiny held something else in store for him. He has played a soldier in Holiday and Kesari, a special agent in Baby and a naval officer in Rustom. The actor was applauded by many for showing his concern towards the families of 12 slain jawans of the Central Reserve Police Force (CRPF) who were killed in Chhattisgarh's Sukma district on Saturday, 11 March 2017. He donated Rs. 10.8 million to the families of the martyred jawans. In August 2016, Kumar had donated Rs. 8 million to the families of army men. He gave Rs 500,000 to each family and said our soldiers need money along with "samman". In October 2016, Akshay donated Rs. 900,000 to the family of a martyred BSF jawan.

He also donated Rs. 15 million to build the shelter for transgender persons in Chennai. He is supporting the construction of the home. Laxmii's director Raghava Lawrence shared the "good news" of the actor's new initiative with friends and fans along with some pictures on Facebook.

Kumar endorses Swachh Bharat Mission, Builds Toilets in Madhya Pradesh, he had previously posted a video on social media, talking about the importance of having individual toilets at home, His movie Toilet was also based on Toilet's importance. He was named Uttarakhand's brand ambassador for 'Swachhta Abhiyaan'.

In 2017, Kumar launched the Bharat Ke Veer app, with the help of the home ministry. The platform lets people send money directly to the bank accounts of family members of soldiers martyred in the line of duty. On The Kapil Sharma Show, Akshay said that he was only carrying out his responsibility as a citizen with the app. "Hum yeh kahenge, ki hum apna kartvaya nibhate hai… Jo shaheed hote hai, unka nuksaan hum kabhi bhar nahi paayenge. That is for sure. Sarkar unko jo deti hai, woh deti hai. Lekin, as a civilian, humara bhi toh kuch kartavya banta hai. Yeh aisa app hai… Na iske beech mein koi NGO hai, na koi sarkar hai," he said. In the aftermath of Pulwama terror attack on the CRPF jawans, Kumar came forward to help the families of those sacrificed their lives in the attack. He donated Rs. 1.5 million to a martyred jawan's family and even urged his fans to do the same. He further pledged to donate Rs. 50 million through 'Bharat Ke Veer' app. He additionally donated Rs. 900,000 each to the families of 12 CRPF jawans who were killed in Chhattisgarh. In mid-2020 when Kerala, Assam and Chennai were left devastated as they were hit by floods that severely affected several families as they lost their houses, land, crops, many people died. Kumar donated a sum of Rs. 10 million each to not just Kerala but also Assam and Chennai. CM Sonowal thanks Kumar.

Kumar was one of the first personalities from Bollywood to contribute to the PM CARES Fund right at the start of the first wave of the COVID-19 pandemic in March 2020, he donated Rs. 250 million to the Prime Minister's Fund and another crore to ex-cricketer Gautam Gambhir's charity for the same cause. The former cricketer revealed on Twitter that Akshay Kumar had donated Rs. 10 million to his foundation during the deadly second wave to help people affected by the novel coronavirus. Gambhir wrote, "Every help in this gloom comes as a ray of hope. Thanks a lot Akshay Kumar for committing Rs 10 million to #GGF for food, meds and oxygen for the needy! God bless."

In 2021, Kumar donated ₹1 crore for construction of a school building in Neeru Village of Bandipora district in Jammu and Kashmir.

In August 2024, Kumar donated ₹1.21 crore to Haji Ali Dargah for its maintenance.

== Accolades ==
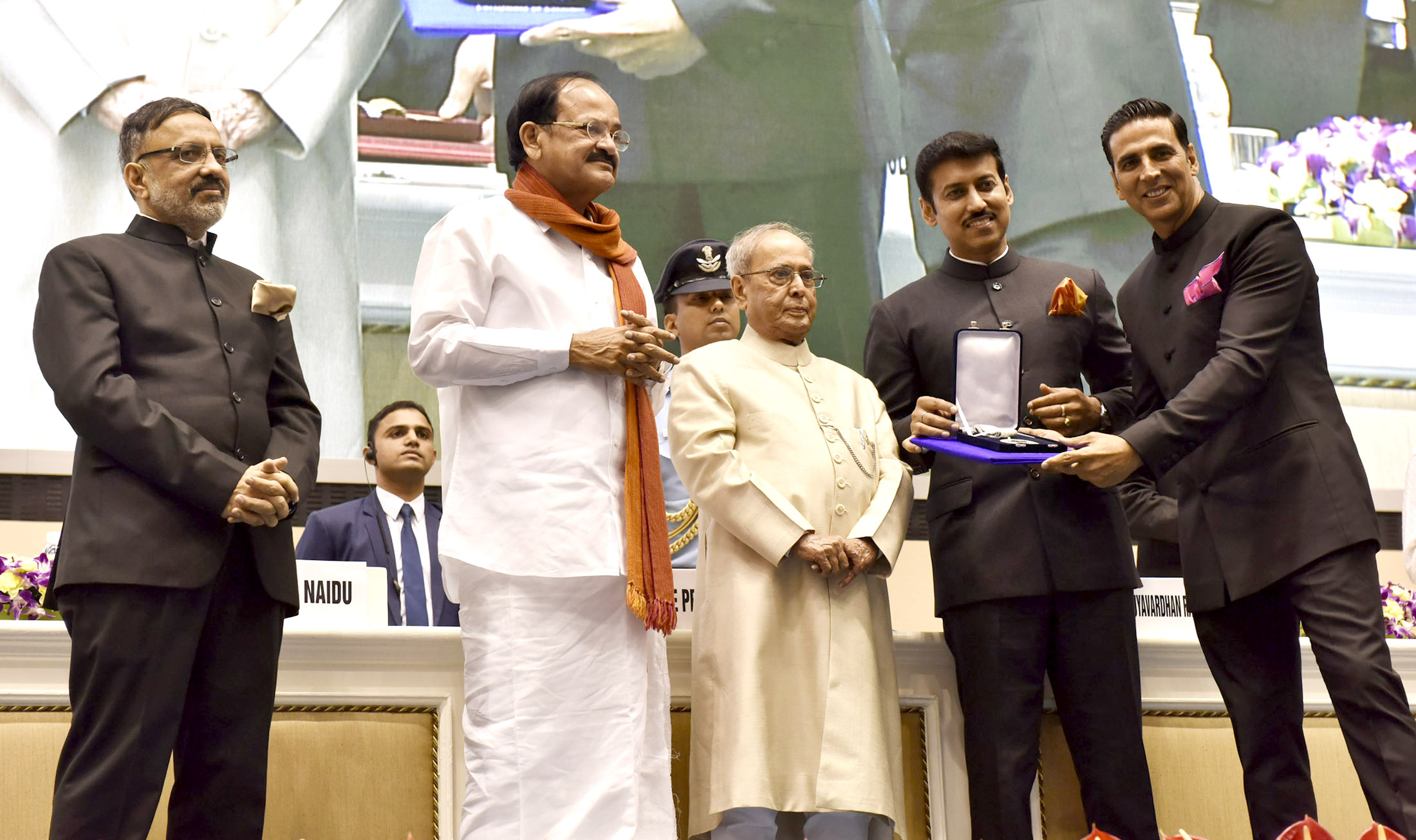
Akshay receiving National Film Awards for Best Actor (2017) from President Pranab Mukherjee in May 2017

Kumar has been recipient of two Filmfare Awards from 17 nominations: Best Villain for Ajnabee (2002) and Best Comedian for Garam Masala (2006), and a National Film Award for Best Actor for the films Rustom and Airlift (both 2016). In 2008, the University of Windsor conferred an honorary Doctorate of Law on Kumar in recognition of his contribution to Indian cinema. The following year, he was awarded the Padma Shri by the Government of India. In 2011, The Asian Awards honoured Kumar for his outstanding achievement in Cinema.
