= Chief Minister Fellowship =

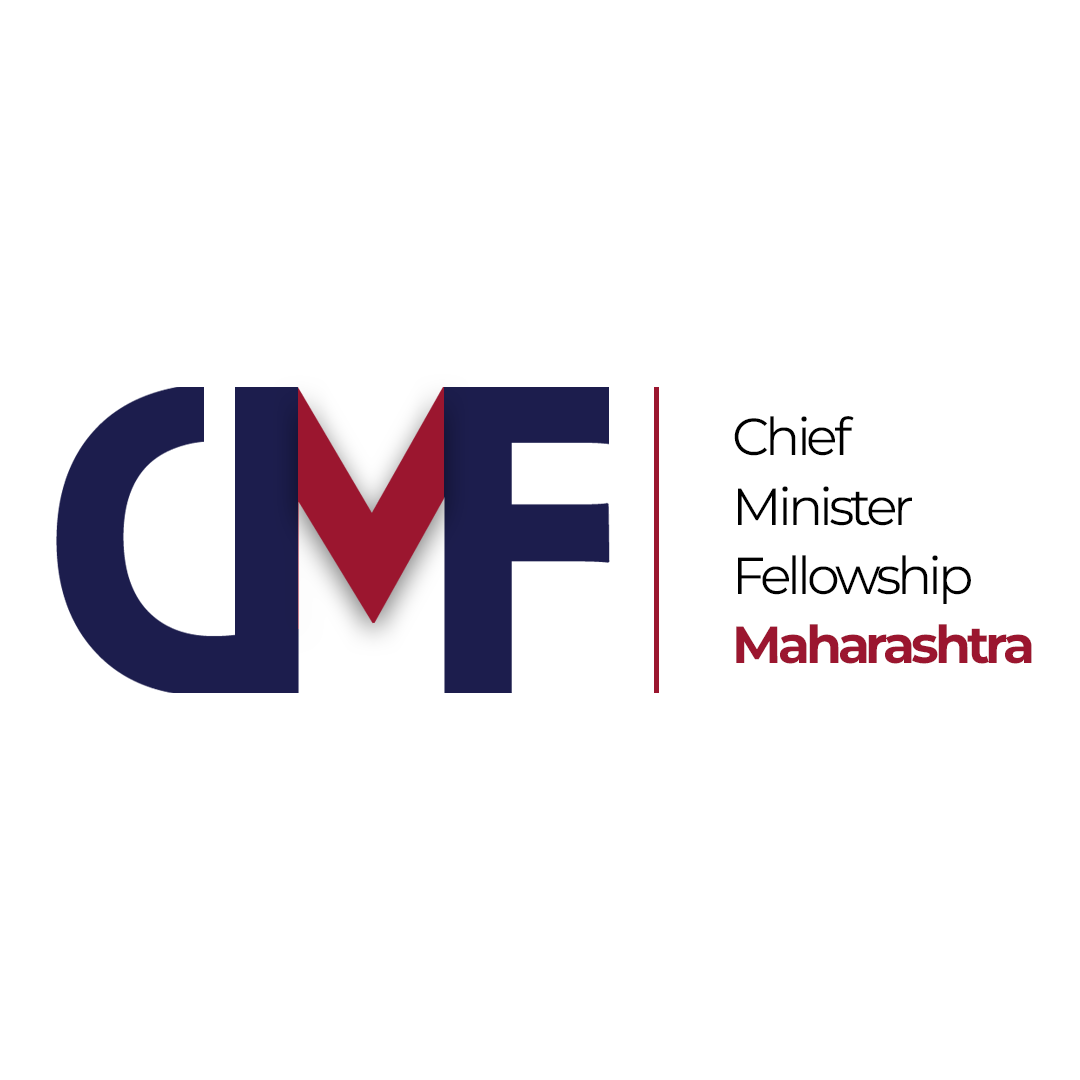
Official Logo of Chief Minister Fellowship, Government of Maharashtra

Chief Minister Fellowship is a 12-month long fellowship program run by the Chief Minister's Office, Government of Maharashtra, India. The program was launched by the then Chief Minister of Maharashtra Devendra Fadnavis in 2015 with an aim of involving young professionals in various key initiatives and departments of the Maharashtra State Government. Their web-page explains that the fellowship is designed in a way to provide the fellows a better understanding of governance, public administration and policy-making and at the same time the government can leverage the diverse experiences and enthusiasm of the fellows to better coordinate existing projects and introduce new ones.

The Fellowship is managed through the Chief Minister's Office in Mumbai with the Chief Minister serving as the Chief Mentor for all fellows.

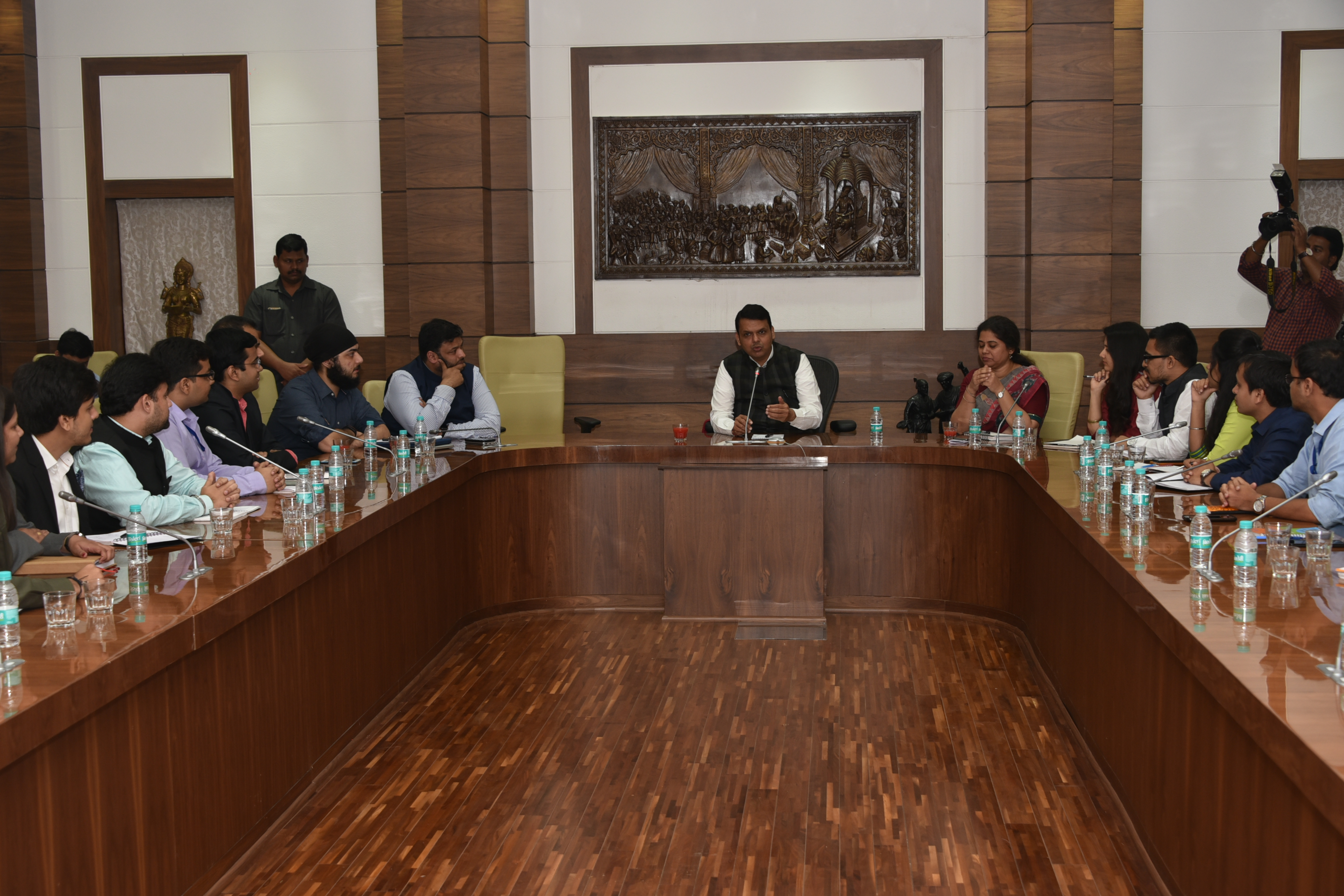
Chief Minister of Maharashtra, Devendra Fadnavis interacting with the 2017-18 batch of fellows.

== Eligibility and Selection Procedure ==
Applicants who are between the ages of 21 and 26 in the year of the Fellowship are eligible to apply. Additionally, a graduation in any discipline and a minimum full-time work experience of 1 year is also required. Every year, close to 50 fellows are selected and assigned to work on various projects and schemes pertaining to areas such as planning, finance, forests, urban development, tribal development, infrastructure, women and child development, state police and transport among many others. The selection procedure is highly competitive with the Fellowship receiving more than 4000 eligible applications for every batch of 50 fellows.

The process of the selection has so far involved a combination of online examinations, submission of essays and interviews with a panel of experts and government officials.

== Impact ==
Started with the initiative of increasing the participation of youth in governance and policy implementation, fellows have worked on several of Maharashtra government's key projects and initiatives. These include coordination and tracking of big-ticket infrastructure projects such as Mumbai Metro, Navi-Mumbai Airport and Mumbai-Nagpur Highway through the Chief Minister's War-room and the setting up of a social responsibility cell named Sahbhag. The fellows have also been involved in flagship projects such as Jalyukt Shivar Abhiyan, 50 crore tree plantation project, setting up of the UN Action Room to Reduce Poverty Alleviation and Pune Metro and ring-road project. Previously, the fellows have been successful in the implementation of innovative initiatives such as drafting Maharashtra's Startup Policy, securing a funding from the Central Government for the purchase of electric buses for BEST and the setting up of Wadhwani AI. Several fellows also work in the District Headquarters where they work on bridging the coordination gap between the State and Local governments.
