= Jayesh Sheth =

Indian fashion photographer

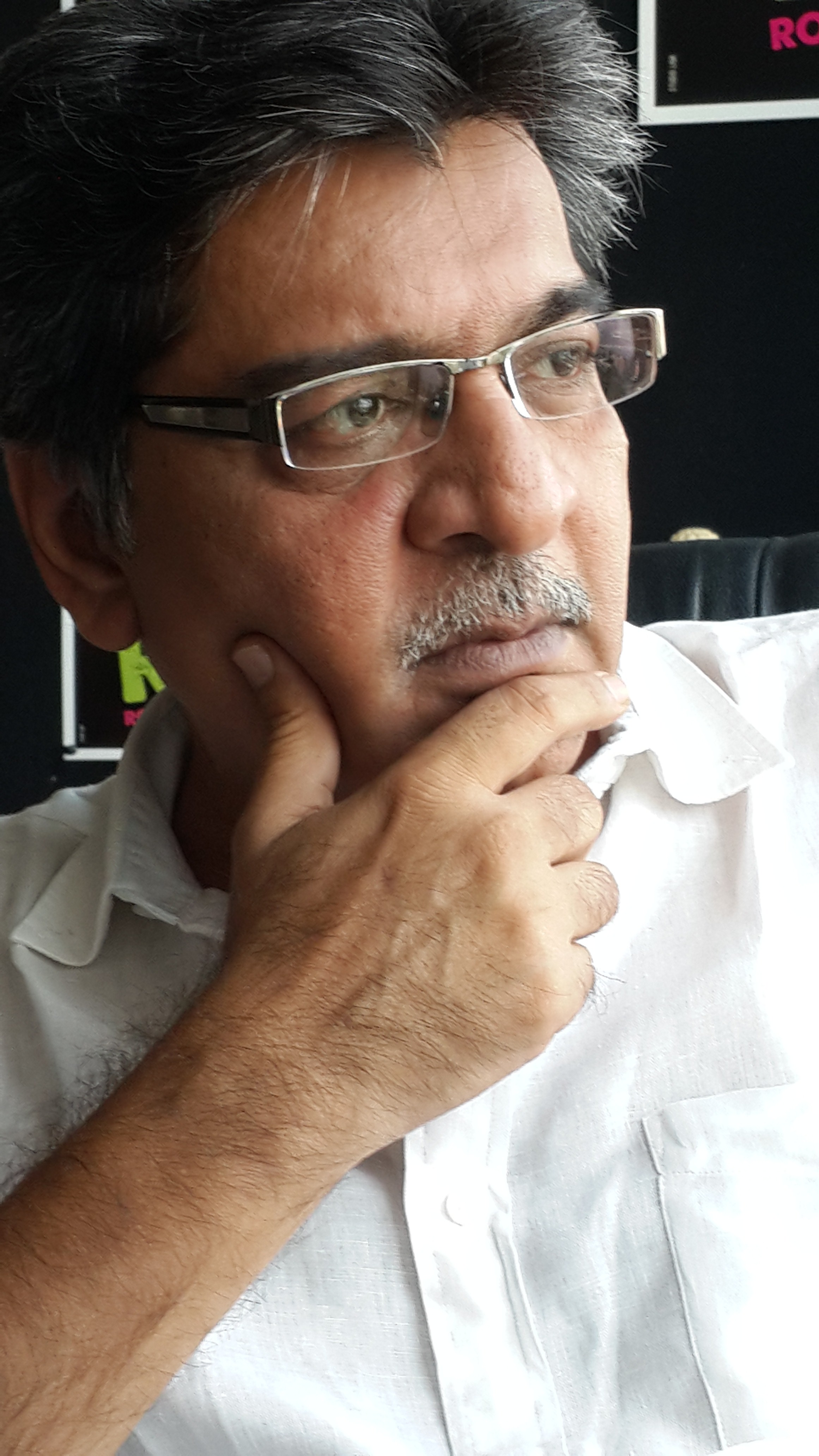
- Born: 20th century India
- Education: Sir J. J. School of Art
- Occupation: Photographer

Jayesh Sheth (born 20th century) is an Indian fashion photographer.

Sheth is credited with shooting the first portfolios of Akshay Kumar, Rani Mukherjee, Mamta Kulkarni and Smriti Irani.

Sheth completed his diploma from the Sir J. J. School of Art in Mumbai.

His photography career started in 1978.

In 2015, Sheth directed his debut film Roll Sound Camera Action, which premiered at the 2015 Montreal World Film Festival.
