= Bharat Ke Veer =

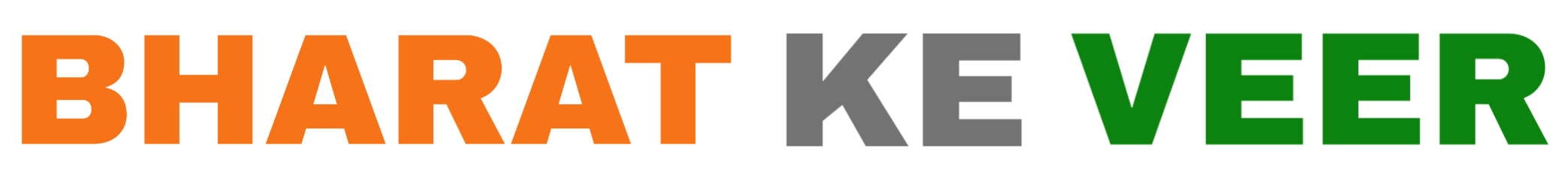
- Location: India
- Owner: Supported by Ministry of Home Affairs, Government of India
- Founder: Flt Lt Mukund B Vala, Akshay Kumar, Rajnath Singh
- Established: 9 April 2017
- Website: bharatkeveer.gov.in

Bharat Ke Veer (Hindi: भारत के वीर), (lit. 'Warriors of India') is a fund-raising initiative by actor Akshay Kumar to benefit members of government paramilitary forces (the Central Armed Police Forces). It has been proposed to then Indian Home Minister Rajnath Singh, Ministry of Home Affairs, Government of India. It allows donations of up to ₹1.5 million to the account of an individual soldier, or unlimited donations to the general "Bharat Ke Veer" fund. The general fund is distributed on the basis of need to families of Central Armed Police Force or Assam Rifles personnel. Money is credited to the next of kin of Central Armed Police Force personnel in all seven branches or National Disaster Response Force and Assam Rifles soldiers.

The official anthem of Bharat Ke Veer' was launched on 20 January 2018 by Home Minister Rajnath Singh along with Bollywood actor, Akshay Kumar and other ministers Kiren Rijiju and Hansraj Ahir.

== See also ==
- Maa Bharati Ke Sapoot
