= Relaxo =

Indian footwear company

Relaxo Footwears Limited
- Type: Public
- Traded as: NSE: RELAXO; BSE: 530517
- ISIN: INE131B01039
- Industry: Footwear
- Founded: 1976; 50 years ago
- Founders: Mukand Lal Dua; Ramesh Kumar Dua
- Headquarters: New Delhi, India
- Area served: Worldwide
- Brands: Relaxo; Bahamas; Flite; Belle; Sparx; Boston; Mary Jane; Kid's fun
- Revenue: ▲₹2,653 crore (US$280 million) (FY22)
- Net income: ▼₹232 crore (US$24 million) (FY22)
- Website: www.relaxofootwear.com

Relaxo Footwears Limited is an Indian multinational footwear company based in New Delhi. The company is the largest footwear manufacturer in India in terms of volume and second-largest in terms of revenue. The company makes products under 10 brands including Flite, Sparx, Bahamas and Schoolmate.

Among Bollywood actors signed up to endorse the company's brands are Salman Khan, Akshay Kumar, Katrina Kaif and Sonakshi Sinha.

In December 2023, Relaxo Footwears acquired a 30-acre land parcel in Bhiwadi, Rajasthan, for ₹135 crore.

== See also ==
- Liberty Shoes
