= List of awards and nominations received by Akshay Kumar =

Akshay Kumar awards and nominations
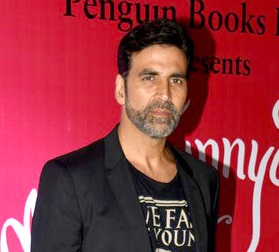
- Kumar in 2015
Awards and nominations
Award	Wins	Nominations
National Film Awards	2	0
The Asian Awards	1	0
Asian Film Awards	0	1
Filmfare Awards	2	17
Screen Awards	1	3
IIFA Awards	3	5
Stardust Awards	10	6
BIG Star Entertainment Awards	4	4
Producers Guild Awards	2	0
Zee Cine Awards	2	11
Star Box Office Awards	1	2
Indian Television Awards	1	0
'Hello! Hall of Fame' Awards	1	0
Star's Sabse Favourite Awards	2	0
Other awards	17	0

Totals (Note: Certain award groups do not simply award one winner. They acknowledge several different recipients, have runners-up, and have third place. Since this is a specific recognition and is different from losing an award, runner-up mentions are considered wins in this award tally. For simplification and to avoid errors, each award in this list has been presumed to have had a prior nomination.)
- Wins: 53
- Nominations: 62

Akshay Kumar (born 9 September 1967) is an Indian actor, film producer and television personality who works in Hindi-language films. He won the National Film Award for Best Actor in 2016 for his performance in Rustom (2016). He has been nominated for the Filmfare Awards several times, winning it two times. In 2008, he won the Screen Award for Best Actor (Popular Choice) for his performance in Singh Is Kinng and in 2009, he was nominated for Asian Film Award for Best Actor. In 2008, 2011, and 2013, he won the Stardust Award for Star of the Year – Male.

In 2008, the University of Windsor conferred an Honorary Doctorate of Law on Kumar in recognition of his contribution to the cinema of India. The following year he was awarded the Padma Shri by the Government of India. In 2011, The Asian Awards honoured Kumar for his achievement in Indian cinema.

In 2025, Kumar received the Most Stylish Mega Performer of the Year award at the Bollywood Hungama Style Icons Awards, and was honoured as the Timeless Style Icon at the Hindustan Times India's Most Stylish Awards.

== Civilian award ==
- 2009 – Padma Shri, India's fourth highest civilian award from the Government of India.

== Honorary Doctorate ==
- 2008 – Honorary Doctorate of Law by the University of Windsor in Ontario, Canada for his outstanding work in the film industry and contribution to social work.

== The Asian Awards ==
Year	Category	Result	Ref.
2011	Outstanding Achievement in Cinema	Won	

== Asian Film Awards ==
Year	Category	For	Result	Ref.
2009	Best Actor	Singh Is Kinng	Nominated	

== National Film Awards ==
The National Film Awards is the most prominent film award ceremony in India. Established in 1954, it is administered by the International Film Festival of India and the Indian government's Directorate of Film Festivals. The awards are presented by the President of India.

Year	Category	For	Result
2017	Best Actor	Rustom	Won
2019	Best Film on Other Social Issues	Pad Man	Won

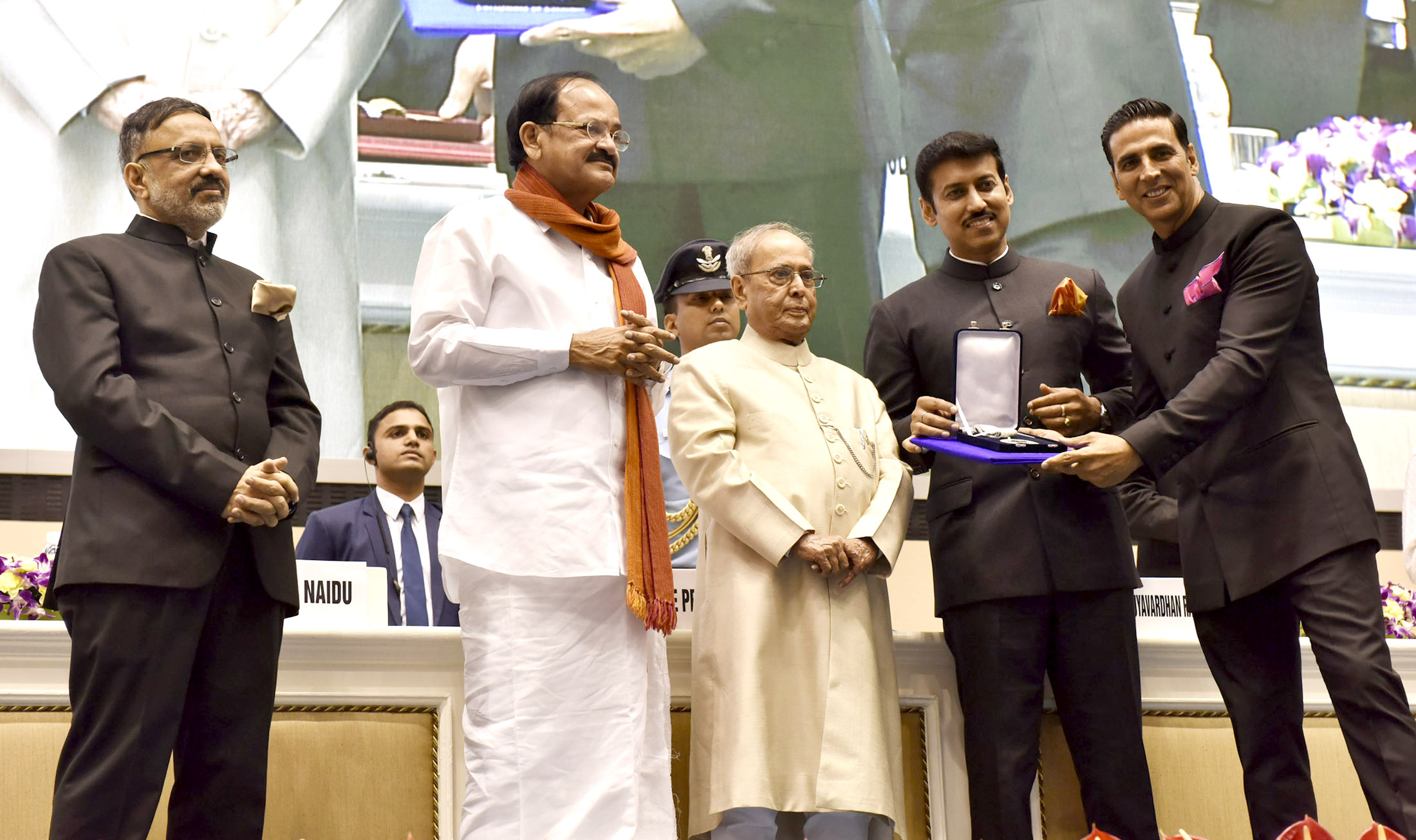
Akshay receiving National Film Awards for Best Actor (2017) from President Pranab Mukherjee in May 2017

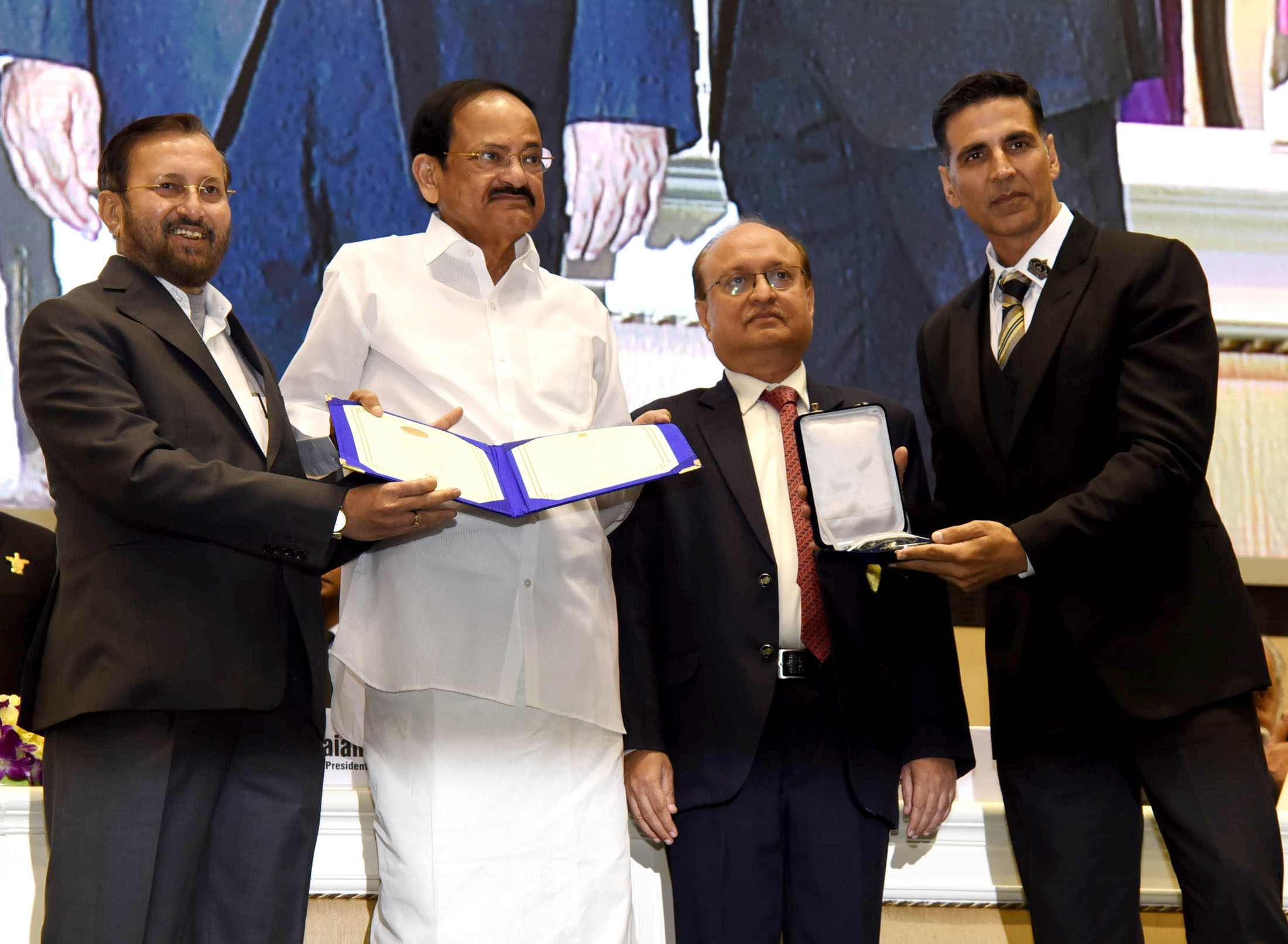
Receiving National Film Award for Best Film on Social issues from Vice President M. Venkaiah Naidu on 2019

== Filmfare Awards ==
Year	Category	For	Result	Ref.
1995	Best Actor	Yeh Dillagi	Nominated	
1998	Best Supporting Actor	Dil To Pagal Hai	Nominated	
2002	Best Villain	Ajnabee	Won	
2004	Best Actor	Andaaz	Nominated	
2005	Best Supporting Actor	Khakee	Nominated	
2005	Best Supporting Actor	Mujhse Shaadi Karogi	Nominated	
2005	Best Comedian	Mujhse Shaadi Karogi	Nominated	
2006	Best Comedian	Garam Masala	Won	
2008	Best Actor	Namastey London	Nominated	
2009	Best Actor	Singh Is Kinng	Nominated	
2013	Best Supporting Actor	OMG: Oh My God!	Nominated	
2015	Best Actor	Holiday	Nominated	
2018	Best Actor	Toilet: Ek Prem Katha	Nominated	
2019	Best Actor	Pad Man	Nominated	
2020	Best Actor	Kesari	Nominated	
2025	Best Actor	Sarfira	Nominated	

== Filmfare Awards South ==
Year	Category	For	Result	Ref.
2019	Best Supporting Actor – Tamil	2.0	Nominated	

== Screen Awards ==
Year	Category	For	Result	Ref.
2005	Best Supporting Actor	Mujhse Shaadi Karogi	Nominated	
2005	Jodi No. 1 (along with Priyanka Chopra)	Aitraaz	Nominated	
2009	Best Actor (Popular Choice)	Singh Is Kinng	Won	
2017	Best Actor	Rustom	Nominated	

== IIFA Awards ==
Year	Category	For	Result	Ref.
2000	Best Actor	Dhadkan	Nominated	
2002	Best Villain	Ajnabee	Won	
2005	Best Comedian	Mujhse Shaadi Karogi	Won	
2006	Best Comedian	Garam Masala	Nominated	
2008	IIFA Special Award from the host country, Thailand		Won	
2008	Best Actor	Bhool Bhulaiyaa	Nominated	
2009	IIFA Star of the Decade – Male		Nominated	
2013	Best Supporting Actor	OMG: Oh My God!	Nominated	
2018	Best Actor	Toilet: Ek Prem Katha	Nominated	

== Stardust Awards ==
Year	Category	For	Result	Ref.
2005	Best Actor in a Comic Role	Mujhse Shaadi Karogi	Nominated	
2005	Star of the Year – Male	Khakee & Aitraaz	Nominated	
2008	Star of the Year – Male	Heyy Babyy & Namastey London	Won	
2009	Star of the Year – Male	Singh Is Kinng	Nominated	
2009	Best Film (Popular)	Singh Is Kinng	Won	
2010	Best Actor – Popular (Male)	Blue	Won	
2010	Best Actor (Critics)	8 x 10 Tasveer	Won	
2010	Best Actor in a Comic Role	De Dana Dan	Nominated	
2011	Star of the Year – Male	Housefull and Tees Maar Khan	Won	
2011	Best Actor in a Comedy or Romance	Housefull and Tees Maar Khan	Won	
2012	Best Actor in a Comedy or Romance	Desi Boyz	Won	
2013	Best Actor – Action/Thriller	Rowdy Rathore and Khiladi 786	Won	
2017	Stardust Award for Actor of the Year - Male	Airlift	Nominated	

== BIG Star Entertainment Awards ==
Year	Category	For	Result	Ref.
2012	Most Entertaining Social Film	OMG: Oh My God!	Won	
2012	Complete Entertainer of the Year – Male	—	Won	
2012	Most Entertaining Actor in a Thriller Role – Male	Rowdy Rathore	Won	
2012	Most Entertaining Actor in an Action Role – Male	Rowdy Rathore	Won	
2013	Most Entertaining Actor in an Action Role – Male	Boss	Nominated	
2013	Most Entertaining Actor in a Thriller Role – Male	Special 26	Nominated	
2013	BIG Star Most Entertaining Actor (Film) – Male	Special 26	Nominated	
2020	Most Challenging Actor	Kesari	Nominated	

== Apsara Film & Television Producers Guild Awards ==
Year	Category	For	Result	Ref.
2008	Best Entertainer of the Year 2007	Namastey London, Heyy Babyy, Bhool Bhulaiyaa & Welcome	Won	
2015	Special Award	Completing 25 years in the industry	Won	

== Zee Cine Awards ==
Year	Category	Film	Result	Ref.
2006	Best Actor – Male	Waqt: The Race Against Time	Nominated	
2008	Best Actor – Male	Namastey London	Nominated	
2011	Best Actor – Male	Housefull	Nominated	
2012	International Male Icon	—N/a	Nominated	
2014	Best Actor in a Negative Role – Male	Once Upon A Time In Mumbai Dobaara	Nominated	
2016	Best Actor – Male	Baby	Nominated	
2017	Best Actor – Male	Airlift	Nominated	
2018	Best Actor – Male (Viewers Choice)	The State vs Jolly LL.B 2	Won	
2018	Best Actor – Male (Viewers Choice)	Toilet: Ek Prem Katha	Nominated	
2020	Best Actor – Male	Good Newwz	Nominated	
2026	Best Actor – Male	Kesari Chapter 2	Won	
2026	Best Actor – Male	Jolly LLB 3	Nominated	

== Star Box Office Awards ==
The Star Box Office Awards are a collaboration between Star Plus and Box Office India. The Star Box Office Awards ceremony recognizes the achievements of Hindi films objectively, based on its performance at the box office.

Year	Category	For	Result	Ref.
2014	Box Office 1000 Crore Club Hero	Achievement in Bollywood	Won	
2014	Mr. Box Office	Holiday: A Soldier Is Never Off Duty	Nominated	
2014	Mr. Money Bags	Holiday: A Soldier Is Never Off Duty	Nominated	

== Indian Television Awards ==
Year	Category	For	Result	Ref.
2009	Radio Mirchi Presents Best Television Personality		Won	

== 'Hello! Hall Of Fame' Awards ==
Year	Category	For	Result	Ref.
2010	Stylish Couple Of The Year Award (along with Twinkle Khanna)		Won	

== Star's Sabsey Favourite Awards ==
Year	Category	For	Result	Ref.
2009	Actor of the Year		Won	
2010	Actor of the Year		Won	

== South Indian International Movie Awards ==
Year	Category	For	Result	Ref.
2019	Best Actor in a Negative Role – Tamil	2.0	Nominated	

== Pinkvilla Screen and Style Icons Awards ==
Year	Category	For	Result	Ref.
2024	Entertainer Of The Decade	—N/a	Won	
2025	Best Actor – Jury's Choice	Sarfira	Won	

== Other awards ==
- 2002 – Sansui Viewers' Choice Movie Awards: Best Actor in a Villainous role for Ajnabee
- 2003 – Bollywood Fashion Awards: Celebrity Style (Male)
- 2006 – Best Action Actor at AXN Action Awards
- 2010 – Best Action Actor in a Negative Role at AXN Action Awards for Blue
- 2008 – Asia's Sexiest Man Alive
- 2015 – Filmfare Glamour & Style Awards: Most Glamorous Star (Male).
- 2015 – GQ Awards: Ultimate Man of the Year award.
- 2018 – GQ India Style Awards: GQ Legend award.
- 2018 – Lions Gold Award Best Actor – Popular (For selfless contribution towards the nation through social message in films)
- 2018 – Indian Film Festival of Melbourne Best Actor Award for Pad Man.
- 2019 – HT India's Most Stylish – Hottest Trendsetter (Male).
- 2004 – Rajiv Gandhi Award for his Outstanding achievements in Bollywood.
- 2009 – IIFA-FICCI Frames, "Most Powerful Entertainer of the Decade Award" for his contribution to Indian cinema.
- 2025 – Bollywood Hungama Style Icons Award for Most Stylish All-rounder MEGA Star OF THE YEAR for his performance in Sky Force and Kesari Chapter 2.
- 2025 – HT India's Most Stylish - Timeless Style Icon Award

== Honours and recognitions ==
- 2008 – Named "Sexiest Man Alive" by People (India) magazine.
- 2009 – He was awarded the highest Japanese honour of "Katana" and a sixth degree Black Belt in Kuyukai Gojuryu Karate.
- 2009 – He was one of the 15 international celebrities invited for the Olympics torch-bearer rally to Canada.
- 2012 – He inaugurated the 43rd International Film festival of India in Goa.
- 2013 – Named "Reader's Choice Style Icon".
