= Maa Bharati Ke Sapoot =

Indian charitable website

- Location: India
- Owner: Supported by Ministry of Defence, Government of India
- Founder: Rajnath Singh
- Established: 10 October, 2022
- Website: maabharatikesapoot.mod.gov.in

Maa Bharati Ke Sapoot (lit. 'Children of Mother India') is a website run by India's Ministry of Defence to benefit members of Indian Armed Forces. Defence Minister Rajnath Singh launched it in 2022, so that the public can contribute directly to the Armed Forces Battle Casualties Welfare Fund (AFBCWF).

AFBCWF is a Tri-Service fund of Army, Air Force and Navy, utilized for immediate assistance to the families of military personnel who get killed in action or get grievously injured in operations. Indian actor Amitabh Bachchan is the ‘Goodwill Ambassador’ of the initiative.

== See also ==
- Bharat Ke Veer
