= Chief ministership of Devendra Fadnavis =

Political position of Devendra Fadnavis

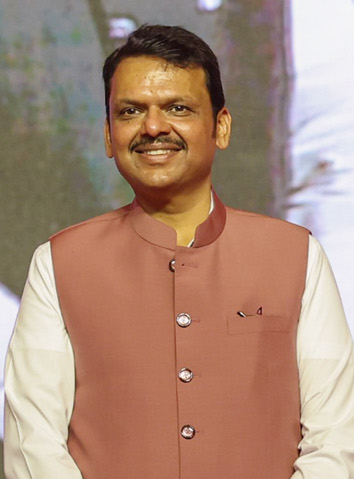
- Fadnavis in 2024
- Chief ministership of Devendra Fadnavis
- Premier: Devendra Fadnavis
- Party: Bharatiya Janata Party
- First term 31 October 2014 – 12 November 2019
- Cabinet: First
- Election: 2014
- Appointed by: Governor, C. Vidyasagar Rao
- Seat: Nagpur South West Assembly
- Second term 23 November 2019 – 28 November 2019
- Cabinet: Second
- Election: 2019
- Appointed by: Governor, Bhagat Singh Koshyari
- Seat: Nagpur South West
- Third term 5 December 2024 – present
- Cabinet: Third
- Election: 2024
- Appointed by: Governor, C. P. Radhakrishnan
- Seat: Nagpur South West

The first chief ministership of Devendra Fadnavis commenced on 31 October 2014 and concluded on 12 November 2019, making him the 18th chief minister of Maharashtra. Fadnavis was sworn in by the then governor, C. Vidyasagar Rao. His second term started on 23 November 2019 to end on 28 November 2019, sworn in by the then governor, Bhagat Singh Koshyari with Ajit Pawar as his deputy. His second term ended after the 2019 Maharashtra political crisis. A member of the Maha Yuti alliance, he served as Deputy Chief Minister of Maharashtra with Ajit Pawar under Eknath Shinde after the 2022 Maharashtra political crisis. He is currently serving as the chief minister, sworn in by the then governor, C. P. Radhakrishnan on 5 December 2024 for a third term with Eknath Shinde and Ajit Pawar as his deputies.

== First term ==
Fadnavis took over as the legislative party leader after winning a vote by the BJP MLAs in the presence of the party's central observers, Union Home minister Rajnath Singh and the party's National General Secretary Jagat Prakash Nadda after being elected to the position. As the leader of the largest party in Maharashtra state assembly, Fadnavis was appointed as the chief minister of Maharashtra on 31 October 2014. His government won a confidence motion by voice vote on 12 November 2014 allowing it to govern.

=== Flagship projects and initiatives ===
==== Mumbai Next ====
Fadnavis launched 'Mumbai Next' on 30 January 2015, which was termed a roadmap to convert the country's financial capital into a global financial and entertainment hub. On 6 February, the Fadnavis government held a high-profile conference under the project's umbrella, which was attended by Tata Sons Ltd chairman Cyrus Mistry, Reliance Industries Ltd chairman Mukesh Ambani, and other prominent business leaders.

==== Police digitisation project ====
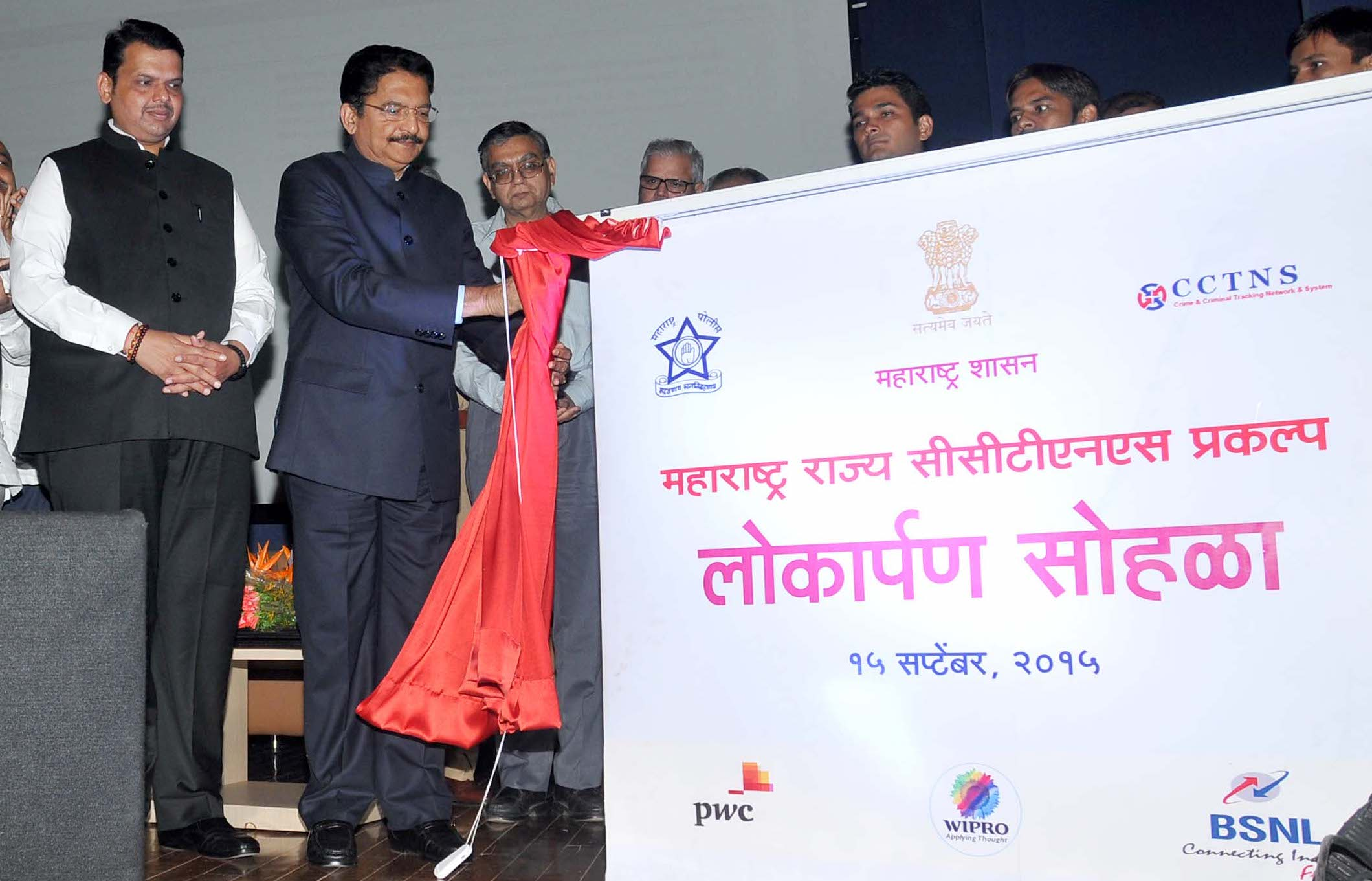
Chief Minister Fadnavis launch (CCTNS) 15-9-2015 Maharashtra Crime and Criminal Tracking Network & Systems

On 15 September 2015, Fadnavis inaugurated the Maharashtra Crime and Criminal Tracking Network and Systems (CCTNS) in Nagpur, advancing the state's ambition to digitise its police force. Fadnavis, who was also the state home minister, stated, "The CCTNS initiative would put all police stations in the state online and paperless." After the implementation of CCTNS, Maharashtra became the country's first state to establish India's first crime-criminal tracking network (CCTNS).

==== Digital initiatives - launch of cyber labs and village digitisation ====
In 2016, under his chief ministership, Maharashtra launched several digital initiatives to mark 70th Independence Day.

==== Samruddhi Expressway ====
Under the chief ministership of Fadnavis, the Maharashtra Government proposed an initiative for Nagpur-Mumbai Super Communication Way. This infrastructure was initiated to be built as a part to boost economic development in the rural areas of Maharashtra. This Mahamarg is built to enable a safe and fast commute between Mumbai and Nagpur along with new towns planned at the intersections. The expressway will reduce the travel time to just 8 hours (present 16 hours). This expressway will be consisting of charging stations along its length for Electrical Vehicles (EV). The Samruddhi Mahamarg will open new job and employment doors in the coming years, which will bridge rural and urban gaps. The highway has now been renamed as "Hindu Hrudaysamarat Balasaheb Thackeray Maharashtra Samruddhi Highway" by the government on 22 December 2019, and is now planned to complete the entire work of the project by September 2022.

==== 1% Reservation for orphans in Government jobs ====
In 2018, Fadnavis announced a 1% Government Reservation in the open category for orphans education and government jobs in Maharashtra. Maharashtra is the foremost state to obtain such a policy. Fadnavis had initiated this policy after an orphan Amruta Karvande, was declined a job despite clearing Maharashtra State Public Service Commission (MPSC) exam. She then met Fadnavis and shared her resentment. The 1% open category reservation quota shall apply to those children who are granted certificates of being orphans by the Juvenile Homes and the Women and Child Development department. The GR policy states that the Maharashtra Government will create a separate category within the general category which means it will not have to increase its caste reservation quota.

==== CM Fellowship scheme ====
Fadnavis, under his chief ministership, had launched The Chief Minister Fellowship program in 2015. CM Fellowship is an 11-month long fellowship program run by the CM's office, the Government of Maharashtra. This program was launched with the aim of providing administrative experience to the youth. This initiative offers graduates and postgraduates an 11-month stint with the Maharashtra government and carries with its stipend and other perks. The eligibility criteria to apply for the Chief Minister Fellowship Program is the age between 21 and 26 years, graduation with first-class, one-year work experience, and knowledge of Marathi. This CM Fellowship Program offers an opportunity to work with Government.

==== Agricultural pond ====
Maharashtra Government launched the 'Magel Tyala Shettale' scheme in 2016 to overcome the drought and sustainable agriculture in the state. Under this 'Magel Tyala Shettale', 108.33 per cent of the target was achieved. Fadnavis had been touring drought-prone areas in Maharashtra, meanwhile, farmers in the state had demanded to make few farms available for sustainability in agricultural production and increasing availability of irrigation through watersheds and water conservation of drylands in the state These farms have benefited the farmers during the intermittent rainy seasons.

==== Chhatrapati Shivaji Maharaj Krishi Sanman scheme ====
During the Fadnavis-led Government in 2017, Chhatrapati Shivaji Maharaj Krushi Sanman Yojana was announced by Fadnavis, where a Rs 34,022 Crore loan waiver provided relief to 89 Lakh farmers across the state of Maharashtra. This scheme also benefited crop and medium-term borrowers.

==== Marathwada water grid project ====
In 2019, the Fadnavis-led Governance initiated a scheme to set up a water grid project in Marathwada to address the drought situation. The cost of the scheme was proposed at Rs 4,293 Crore. Fadnavis initiated this water grid project and lifted water from Konkan to the Godavari basin to make droughts in Marathwada "A history". The water grid and other new schemes were introduced to make Marathwada shed the tag of being a drought-prone region. The project included a plan for water grid from Israeli partners.

==== Automated weather stations ====
In 2016, Fadnavis during his ministership initiated to launch of automated weather stations (AWS) to prevent huge losses and provide accurate weather stations for farmers in Maharashtra as early and untimely rains and hailstorms cause enormous losses to farmers. The AWS helps measure the accuracy of rain pattern, humidity & expected rainfall along with information on the best crop for farmers. Close to 2,065 such stations were planned to come up in the state on PPP (public-private partnership) models. Maharashtra State Government had collaborated with a private weather forecasting organisation under which a network of AWS was planned to launch. Initially, around 12×12 km area of each taluka was said to have one AWS each. With the capability to record important farming parameters the AWS was said to be a significant role in the life of the farmers in Maharashtra.

==== Allotment of homes to Bombay Dyeing and Srinivas mill workers ====
251 workers of Bombay Dyeing and Srinivas mills were given the keys to their allotted houses on 7 July 2023 marking the second phase of home allotment to them by Maharashtra's chief minister Eknathji Shinde, Deputy Chief Minister Ajit Pawar and Devendra Fadnavis at Sahyadri Guest House, Maharashtra Housing and Area Development Authority (MHADA). Out of 13,760 mill workers included in the lottery, 10,247 have received their homes so far.

The Maharashtra government has also formed a committee under the leadership of MLA Sunil Rane and MLA Kalidas Kolambakar. The committee aims to clear the issue of housing eligibility for 4,000 mill workers in the near future. 43,000 hectares of land have been identified at five locations in the Thane district to provide more homes to the mill workers.

During his tenure as the chief minister of Maharashtra, Fadnavis had exclaimed that every mill worker from Mumbai would get a home. This promise is being fulfilled steadily, as evidenced by the workers getting the keys to their houses.

==== Maratha Reservation Act ====
The Maratha Reservation Act is a legislative effort to grant reservations in government jobs and educational institutions to the Maratha community. This initiative evolved through various socio-political movements and legal deliberations over the years.

===== 1997: Early agitations =====
The demand for the Maratha reservation gained significant momentum in 1997, with major agitations organised by the Maratha Mahasangh and the Maratha Seva Sangh. These movements highlighted the Marathas' socio-economic status, stating that they were primarily Kunbis, historically associated with agrarian communities rather than belonging to upper castes.

2008-09: Political support Former chief ministers such as Sharad Pawar and Vilasrao Deshmukh extended support to the reservation demand, lending political weight to the cause.

==== 2009-14: Initial proposal and legal challenge ====
Various political parties and organisations supported the demand for the Maratha reservation. The Congress-Nationalist Congress Party Democratic Front government, led by Prithviraj Chavan, approved a proposal to reserve 16% of government jobs and educational seats for Marathas and 5% for Muslims.

The Bombay High Court stayed the reservation decision on 14 November, leading to the Bharatiya Janata Party - Shiv Sena government's appeal to the Supreme Court. The Supreme Court refused to vacate the Bombay High Court's interim order in December, after which the government had to provide additional information in support of reservations.

Fadnavis laid the foundations of the Backward Class Commission in 2015, as directed by the High Court to confirm the fact that the Marathas constitute a backward community. He even assured them that quotas would be implemented as soon as the commission submitted its report.

==== 2018: Legislative action ====
The Maratha Reservation Act was framed by the BJP - Shiv Sena MahaYuti coalition government, led by the then CM Devendra Fadnavis, in 2018.

This legislation aimed to provide reservations in government jobs and educational institutions for Maratha candidates, similar to the provisions for the OBC (Other Backward Classes) community. The Maharashtra legislature passed a bill in November proposing a 16% reservation in education and government jobs for the Maratha community, recognising them as socially and educationally backward.

==== 2021: The Supreme Court's decision ====
The Bombay High Court upheld the constitutional validity of the Maratha reservation but recommended reducing it to 12-13%, prompting appeals to the Supreme Court.

==== 2023: Deciding the course of action ====
The act was overturned on 5 May 2023, by the Supreme Court due to perceived legal inadequacies.

Under the leadership of then chief minister, Devendra Fadnavis, the 'MahaYuti' government implemented a range of welfare initiatives for the Maratha community. A meeting was concluded on 4 September 2023, at Sahyadri Guest House, Mumbai by the Maharashtra Cabinet sub-committee to discuss the course of action regarding the topic of the Maratha Reservation. The committee was formed under the chairmanship of retired judges to conduct legal and administrative scrutiny of cases related to providing certificates of Kunbi caste to the Maratha community in Maharashtra, on 6 September 2023.

==== 2024: Implementation of the Maratha Reservation Act ====
The BMC administration conducted a historical survey of 2,65,000 households in Mumbai on 23 January 2024, in order to establish the social backwardness of the Maratha community for reservation, as per the directives of the Supreme Court. On 27 January 2024, the Maharashtra government issued a notification that said that all the 'sage soyare' (blood relatives) of the Kunbis, belonging to the Maratha community, shall be given the Kunbi caste certificates upon verification. The Maharashtra Assembly unanimously passed a bill on 20 February 2024, providing 10% reservation for the Maratha community in education and government jobs.

The Maratha Reservation and State Backward Classes Commission submitted a report affirming the community's social and educational backwardness under Article 342C as well as Article 366(26C) of the Constitution.

From 26 February 2024, the reservation laws were amended, and 10% reservation for Marathas was implemented in education and employment. An advertisement was published on 1 March 2024, announcing the recruitment of 17,000 police personnel, incorporating 10% Maratha reservation for the first time.

==== Mumbai Coastal Road Project ====
The Mumbai Coastal Road Project is a significant infrastructure initiative to improve connectivity and alleviate congestion along Mumbai's coastline. Despite being envisioned in 1967, it wasn't implemented on the ground until the BJP came to power in 2014 in Maharashtra. Under the leadership of Devendra Fadnavis as the chief minister, the coastal road project gained momentum and its phased planning and execution started with full force.

8 May 2014 The then Chief Minister Devendra Fadnavis announced the commencement of Mumbai's Coastal Road from Nariman Point to Kandivali and the Mumbai Trans Harbor Link project from Sewri to Nhava Sheva.

6 June 2015 Under Fadnavis' leadership, the Maharashtra state government signed a memorandum of understanding (MoU) with the Dutch government to leverage the globally recognised expertise of the Netherlands in environmentally friendly land reclamation and marine infrastructure for the Coastal Road project.

8 June 2015 Efforts led by Devendra Fadnavis resulted in immediate approval from the Central Ministry of Environment and Forests for the project. The Mumbai Municipal Corporation appointed STUP Consultants Pvt. Ltd. and Ernst & Young for feasibility studies and environmental impact assessments.

30 September 2016 The Maharashtra Coastal Zone Management Authority (MCZMA) granted final approval for the Coastal Road project in a meeting.

11 May 2017 The Coastal Road project received its ultimate approval from the Central Ministry of Environment, Forest, and Climate Change. Devendra Fadnavis acknowledged the support of Prime Minister Narendra Modi and Union Minister Anil Dave in securing this approval.

17 December 2019 The Supreme Court lifted the stay on the Coastal Road project based on documents and reports submitted by the state government, allowing the project to commence.

19 September 2022 Devendra Fadnavis, after returning to power, initiated meetings to resolve pending issues regarding the completion of the Coastal Road. He acknowledged the support received from the Koli community. Fadnavis, along with Chief Minister Eknath Shinde, announced the completion of 62% of the work on the Coastal Road from Princess Street to Worli, Bhuyari Marg, and the underground tunnel.

11 March 2024 On Chhatrapati Shivaji Maharaj Balidan Din, Maharashtra Chief Minister Eknath Shinde, Deputy Chief Minister Devendra Fadnavis and Deputy Chief Minister Ajit Pawar jointly inaugurated the Dharamveer Swaraj Rakshak Chhatrapati Shambaji Mumbai Coastal Road.

Phase 1 The first phase stretches over 10.58 kilometres from Princess Street Flyover to the Bandra Worli Sea Link. Its construction commenced on 16 December 2018, with the foundation stone laying at Amarsons Garden in Cumbala Hill. AECOM Technology Corporation served as the appointed consultant for the project. For this phase, 111 hectares of land were acquired, facilitating the construction of two carriageways with 4 lanes each. For protection against natural elements, two sea walls, measuring 7.47 kilometres in length and 8.5 meters in height, were erected, fortified with 2 to 8-tonne boulders for revetment. Additionally, 16 floodgates were strategically installed along the route. The phase also included the construction of ten bus stations and four parking lots to enhance commuter convenience.

To address congestion at Queens Necklace and Girgaon Chowpatty, two bore tunnels totalling 2.07 kilometres were constructed, connecting Girgaon Chowpatty and Priyadarshini Park. These tunnels, situated at a depth of 14 to 72 meters below ground level, utilised the immersed tube method, for the first time in India.

Phase 2 The second phase of the Mumbai Coastal Road spans from Versova to Dahisar, with an estimated cost of around 18,000 crore rupees. Overseen by the Mumbai Municipal Corporation, this phase underwent a competitive bidding process, with four contractors selected to execute the project.

Segmented into six sections, various companies, including Apco Infra-Tech Pvt. Ltd., J. Kumar, NCCL, Megha Engineering Pvt. Ltd., and Larsen & Toubro have been entrusted with different segments. Encompassing a length of 20.96 kilometres, Phase 2 extends from Malad to Kandivali, featuring an underground tunnel. The segments include:

- Segment A: Versova to Bangur Nagar (4.5 km)
- Segment B: Bangur Nagar to Mindspace, Malad (1.66 km)
- Segments C and D: Mindspace, Malad to Charkop (each 3.66 km)
- Segment E: Charkop to Gorai (3.78 km)
- Segment F: Gorai to Dahisar (3.69 km)

The phase is set to commence before the monsoon and aims for completion within four years.

== Second term ==
On 23 November 2019, Fadnavis formed a government with the help of Ajit Pawar of NCP; however, this government only lasted for a few days. During this short period, Fadnavis chaired a climate resilience meeting with representatives of the World Bank, restarted the Chief Minister's refund cell, and sanctioned ₹5380 crores in aid for farmers.

== Third term ==
Fadnavis was sworn in as the chief minister for the third term with his party BJP winning 132 seats alone. Later, he won the voice vote in the assembly.
