= Dare 2 Dance =

- Logo
- Genre: Dance show; Stunt show
- Created by: Anil Jha
- Presented by: Akshay Kumar
- Starring: Akshay Kumar
- Country of origin: India
- Original language: Hindi
- No. of seasons: 1
- No. of episodes: 13

Production
- Producer: SOL Productions
- Running time: 48-93 minutes
- Production company: SOL Productions

Original release
- Network: Life OK
- Release: 6 September – 25 October 2014

Dare 2 Dance is an Indian reality television show which began on Life OK from 6 September 2014. The show is hosted by the Bollywood actor Akshay Kumar.

== Contestants ==
- Alisha Singh
- Prince
- Rithvik Dhanjani
- Mayuresh Wadkar
- Scarlett
- Sanam Johar
- Emillie
- Sayantani Ghosh
- Kunwar Amar
- Karan Pangali
- Mayuri Bhandari
