= Seven Deadly Arts with Akshay Kumar =

2004 martial arts TV miniseries

Seven Deadly Arts with Akshay Kumar is a seven-part television mini-series that aired on the National Geographic Channel in 2004. It was hosted by Akshay Kumar. Kumar donated his time and talents to the show.

== Description ==
The series showcases the seven martial arts of kalaripayattu, Shaolin Kung Fu, karate, taekwondo, aikido, Muay Thai, capoeira and . Kumar, who began learning martial arts at age 9, played the master for taekwondo, karate, and Muay Thai, and played the student of the other forms of martial arts from different trainers. The series' tagline was "The first thing you learn to kill is your ego". Kumar shared his personal beliefs about martial arts and talked about the benefits it brought to him.

== Broadcast ==
National Geographic Channel announced the series' launch on 27 April 2004. The first part was aired on Sunday, 9 May 2004 at 8:00 p.m. The rest of the parts were aired on the following Sundays. Before the series was launched, National Geographic Channel had planned to broadcast the series' second part in October–November 2004.

== Cast ==
- Akshay Kumar
- Shifu Kanishka Sharma
- Josette D. Normandeau
- Mehul Vora
- Puran Chauhan
- Luisa Elvira
- Jean Frenette

== Production ==
Kumar and his personal trainer, Mehul Vora, wrote the script. Vora also choreographed the mini-series. The series was shot in Manali, Himachal Pradesh and Mumbai in a span of 40 days. The series marked Kumar's television debut.

During the series, Kanishka Sharma taught Shaolin Kung fu to Kumar. Sifu Kaniska Sharma is the first Indian to be trained in Shaolin Temple Secular Discipline Union in China. Yogesh Sahu directed the series. Puran Chauhan also trained Kumar. After the series, Chauhan worked as a stunt director in several Hindi films.
