= Dancer (1991 film) =

1991 Indian Bollywood film

- Directed by: Kishore Vyas
- Written by: Nawab Arzoo
- Produced by: Rajkumar Ludhani
- Starring: Akshay Kumar; Mohini; Dalip Tahil
- Cinematography: S. Pappu
- Edited by: V. N. Mayekar
- Music by: Anand–Milind
- Production company: Ram Lakhan Productions
- Release date: 23 August 1991
- Running time: 156 minutes
- Country: India
- Language: Hindi

Dancer is a 1991 Indian Bollywood drama film directed by Kishore Vyas. It stars Akshay Kumar, Mohini, Mohnish Behl and Dalip Tahil in lead roles. The music was composed by Anand-Milind.

== Plot ==
Raja, a very much talented and struggling dancer lives a poor lifestyle with his childhood friend Dattu and Dattu's sister Radha, who loves Raja from her childhood. While Raja dances and sings, Dattu plays drums. When Raja was a child, his father Suraj (Anand Balraj) was killed and his mother Malti was sentenced for the murder, both of them were renowned artists. One day he sees an advertisement to perform on a famous auditorium. He tries to participate there, but not allowed firstly, then he takes part desperately and wins the first prize, must to the chargin of the former random first prize winner Manish, who now becomes his enemy. On the other side, Manish's former dance partner Priya falls in love with Raja, not only for he is talented, also for he is a very good human being. This angers Manish much more and now Manish tries to kill Raja and arrested. Soon, Raja and Priya discovers that they're childhood lovers of each other. Priya becomes Raja's dance partner and soon they become famous all over India, with the help of her father Rai Bahadur Brij Bhushan Sharma. In the meantime, Malti comes out of the jail after finishing her sentence. Now, Raja confesses his love for Priya to his mother, to which she agrees and wants to meet Priya's father on Priya's birthday. On that day Malti meets with Brij Bhushan, who is none other than that stranger, who attacked to rape her once and killed Suraj when he was trying to save her. Malti walks away from Brij Bhushan, who calls back yelling forget the past, see the happiness of their children and gives a blank cheque. But Malti tells the cheque of the bank is nothing for the sorrow filled bank of hers and shouts in front of everyone that Brij gave her cheque to stop their alliance, the entire party audience speaks Brij Bhushan as a wrong person that annoys him, he raises his hand to beat but Raja gets furious and leaves the party with his mother. Next day Priya tells Raja by phone to meet near temple that overheard by the friend of Brij Bhushan. Near temple when Raja embrace Priya, that person hits him unconscious, now Raja is applied electric shock and Brij Bhushan tells Priya to marry Manish, Priya finally agrees to avoid further torture for Raja. Raja escapes from the room and enters the dance programme, the same time Radha, along with Priya escapes from her father's custody. At last, Priya and Raja dances for the stage programme. At the end of the program, Brij Bhushan comes with his rowdies, fight starts and finally Brij Bhushan gunpoint Malti for which Raja gets hit down by rowdies and Malti this time reveals his father killer is Brij Bhushan, this rises Raja who fights everybody and kills Brij Bhushan at the end of fight by hit him onto electric wire board. Film ends with Raja and Priya marry as per Radha's wish, who got shot from Brij Bhushan earlier while avoiding bullet injury to Raja.

== Cast ==
- Akshay Kumar as Raja
- Mohini as Priya
- Kirti Singh as Radha
- Mohnish Behl as Manish
- Dalip Tahil as Rai Bahadur Brij Bhushan Sharma
- Anjana Mumtaz as Malti
- Anand Balraj as Suraj
- Laxmikant Berde as Dattu
- Mahesh Anand as Brij Bhushan's henchman
- Gajendra Chauhan as Joshi
- Sudhir Dalvi as a street musician
- Dinesh Hingoo as Pestonji Sorabji Batliboy
- Viju Khote as Dhansukh Ghotale
- Gurbachan Singh as Georgie Dada

== Music ==
except the song "Ek Ladki Ne', which was sung by Abhijeet Bhattacharya, in all other songs, the male part was sung by S P Balasubramanyam.

Song	Singer
"Nachoonga To"	S. P. Balasubrahmanyam
"Aao Chalo" (Sad)	S. P. Balasubrahmanyam
"Rimjhim Rimjhim Sawan Barse"	S. P. Balasubrahmanyam, Lata Mangeshkar
"Aao Chalo Milke Gayen" (Happy)	S. P. Balasubrahmanyam, Sadhana Sargam
"Teri Yaad Aaye, Teri Yaad Aaye"	S. P. Balasubrahmanyam, Sadhana Sargam
"Kabhi Mandir, Kabhi Pooja, Kabhi Pooja Ka Vardaan Lage"	S. P. Balasubrahmanyam, Sadhana Sargam, Udit Narayan
"Deewanon Ki, Mastanon Ki, Jawani Hum Jawanon Ki"	S. P. Balasubrahmanyam, Kavita Krishnamurthy, Udit Narayan
"Yekke Yemme, Yekke Yemma"	S. P. Balasubrahmanyam, Kavita Krishnamurthy
"Ek Ladki Ne"	Abhijeet
