= Jalyukt Shivar Abhiyan =

Indian water conservation scheme

- Slogan: Water for all - Drought-free Maharashtra 2023
- Established: 26 January 2016
- Website: wcd.maharashtra.gov.in

The Maharashtra government in India has launched a water conservation scheme named Jalyukt Shivar Abhiyan to make Maharashtra a drought-free state by 2019. The programme aims to make 5000 villages free of water scarcity every year.

The key aim of Jalyukta Shivar Abhiyan is to establish belief in a farmer that "every drop of rainwater is owned by me and it should percolate in my land".

The flagship programme launched by Chief Minister Devendra Fadnavis, Jalyukta Shivar Abhiyan aims to bring water empowerment to 25,000 drought-affected villages in Maharashtra within next five years. The programme Jalyukt Shivar was initiated by Pankaja Munde. With the passing time, the scheme has been going strong with villages building infrastructure and making the programme one of the largest Government initiatives in terms of public participation.

== Logo ==
The Water Conservation Department of Maharashtra government conducted a logo competition on the Maharashtra MyGov Portal with an objective to widen its scope of public participation in flagship program.

Mr Kishor Gaikwad received an award in Mumbai for best design by Hon. Chief Minister of Maharashtra Devendra Fadnavis on 4 January 2018.
