= List of awards and nominations received by Ameesha Patel =

Ameesha Patel awards and nominations
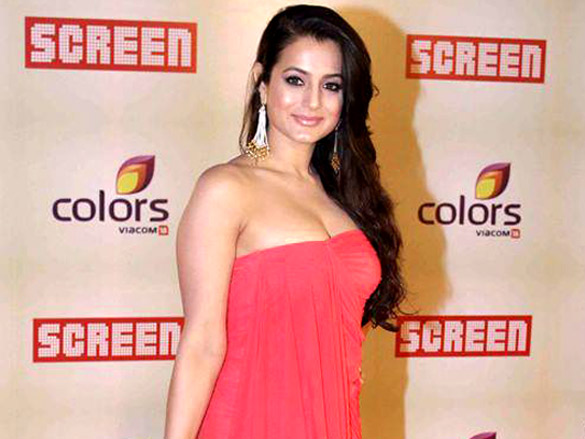
- Patel at 18th Annual Colors Screen Awards in 2012
Awards and nominations
Award	Wins	Nominations

Totals (Note: Certain award groups do not simply award one winner. They acknowledge several different recipients, have runners-up, and have third place. Since this is a specific recognition and is different from losing an award, runner-up mentions are considered wins in this award tally. For simplification and to avoid errors, each award in this list has been presumed to have had a prior nomination.)
- Wins: 8
- Nominations: 20

Ameesha Patel is an Indian actress who appears in Hindi films. She has won the Best Female Debut for her performance in the 2000s romantic action film Kaho Naa... Pyaar Hai and Filmfare Special Award for Gadar: Ek Prem Katha. She has received three Star Screen Awards and IIFA Awards nominations respectively.

== Filmfare Awards ==
Year	Category	Film	Result	Ref.
2001	Best Female Debut	Kaho Naa... Pyaar Hai	Nominated	
2002	Special Award	Gadar: Ek Prem Katha	Won	
2002	Best Actress	Gadar: Ek Prem Katha	Nominated	
2003	Best Actress	Humraaz	Nominated	

== Star Screen Awards ==
Year	Category	Film	Result
2001	Most Promising Newcomer - Female	Kaho Naa... Pyaar Hai	Nominated
2002	Jodi No. 1	Gadar: Ek Prem Katha	Nominated
2002	Best Actress	Gadar: Ek Prem Katha	Nominated
2014	Best Actor in a Negative Role - Female	Shortcut Romeo	Nominated

== Zee Cine Awards ==
Year	Category	Film	Result
2001	Best Female Debut	Kaho Naa... Pyaar Hai	Won
2002	Best Actress	Gadar: Ek Prem Katha	Nominated
2024	Best Supporting Actress	Gadar 2	Nominated

== Bollywood Movie Awards ==
Year	Category	Film	Result
2002	Critics Award for Best Actress	Gadar: Ek Prem Katha	Nominated
2004	Best Actress	Hamraaz	Nominated
2007	Best Supporting Actress	Ankahee	Nominated

== IIFA Awards ==
Year	Category	Film	Result
2001	Best Female Debut	Kaho Naa... Pyaar Hai	Nominated
2002	Best Actress	Gadar: Ek Prem Katha	Nominated
2003	Best Actress	Humraaz	Nominated

== Gujarati Iconic Film Awards ==
Year	Category	Result
2017	Outstanding Contribution To Indian Cinema	Won

== Stardust Awards ==
Year	Category	Film	Result
2009	Best Supporting Actress	Thoda Pyaar Thoda Magic	Nominated

== Sansui Awards ==
Year	Category	Film	Result
2001	Face of the Year	Kaho Naa... Pyaar Hai	Won
2001	Most Promising Debut Actress	Kaho Naa... Pyaar Hai	Nominated
2002	Best Actress -Jury's Choice	Gadar: Ek Prem Katha	Won
2003	Best Actress	Humraaz	Nominated

== Other awards ==
Year	Award	Category	Film	Result
2001	Kalashree Awards	Sensational Discovery	Kaho Naa... Pyaar Hai	Won
2001	Annual Filmgoers Awards	Best Female Debut	Kaho Naa... Pyaar Hai	Won
2002	Annual Filmgoers Awards	Best Actress	Gadar: Ek Prem Katha	Won
2008	Salaam-E-Comedy Awards	Best Actress	Honeymoon Travels Pvt. Ltd.	Nominated
2013	TSR-TV9 National Film Awards	Best Actress	Kaho Naa... Pyaar Hai	Won
