= Chandrakant T. Patel =

Indian scientist (1917–1990)

- Born: 11 July 1917; Sarsa, Kaira, Gujarat, India
- Died: 25 December 1990 (aged 73)
- Education: MSc, Bombay University (1956); Sardar Patel University, honorary D.Sc. degree (1978)
- Known for: Cotton research, innovative methods in plant breeding
- Awards: Hari Om Ashram Award; Indian civilian honour (1977); FICCI Award; Tata Endowment Award; Indian Merchants Chamber Award; Federation of Gujarat Mills and Industry Award; National Tonnage Club Award; Hexamar Award, instituted by The Indian Society for Cotton Improvement (ISCI), Bombay; Vasvik Industrial Research Award for Agricultural Science & Technology (1977); Indian Society for Cotton Improvement (ISCI), Mumbai
- Scientific career
- Fields: Plant Breeding and Genetics
- Institutions: Surat Cotton Research Station

Chandrakant T. Patel, (11 July 1917 – 25 December 1990) was a cotton scientist, who developed the first commercial cotton hybrid, known as Hybrid-4 (Sankar-4), in 1970, which was later cultivated commercially in the states of Gujarat and Maharashtra.

== Biography ==
Chandrakant T. Patel was born in Sarsa in the Kaira District of Gujarat and obtained his MSc degree in Plant Breeding and Genetics from Bombay University in 1954. He is known as Father of Hybrid cotton. He worked at Surat Agricultural University and after two decades of continuous research efforts, successfully developed an intraspecific hybrid by crossing Gujarat-67 X American Nectariless variety, known as Hybrid-4 (H-4), which produced about 80 to 100 qt of Kapas/ha. Earlier research practices.carried out for nearly two decades helped to procure 213–304 kg.lint/ha. But the Hybrid-4 variety produced a record high of 6,918 kg kapas/ha (i.e.:2,352 kg lint/h] H-4 became highly successful in Central India, giving more than twice the yield compared to the parent varieties Gujarath-67. The fibre properties were excellent and its adaptability makes it still popular. This was the first successful hybrid of commercially cultivated cotton and was a turning point in the Indian Cotton Development programme. He devised many innovative methods in plant breeding, the most popular being the nursery-cum-pot irrigation and telephone system, for successful cotton cultivation. The Sardar Patel University in Vallabh Vidyanagar, Gujarat, bestowed an honorary D.Sc. degree on him in 1978. Patel died in 1990 as result of a car accident.

Chandrakant T. Patel (born **11 July 1917**, Sarsa, Gujarat – 25 December 1990) was a cotton scientist who developed the first commercial cotton hybrid, **Hybrid‑4 (H‑4)**.

Rajni Patel (born **9 January 1915, Sarsa; died 3 May 1982) was a barrister and politician, and the grandfather of Ameesha Patel.

According to [Dhirubhia Patel], Chandrakant T. Patel and Rajni Patel were **cousins**, both born in the village of Sarsa.

== Service ==
- Indo American Hybrid Co, as a Scientist.
- Gujarat Agricultural University, Visiting Professor for Post Graduate Students and Cotton Specialist.
- CIMF-CDRA's Research Co-Coordinator,
- A Zonal Co-Ordinator, Gujarat Unit, for AICCI Project of ICAR.
- M. S. Nath Agro, Research Foundation, Research Executive.
- M/S Hoechst Seed Project Center, as a Cotton Specialist.

== Honours ==
He was the recipient of awards and medals:

- Hari Om Ashram Award.
- FICCI Award, Tata Endowment Award, by Indian Merchants Chamber Award.
- Federation of Gujarat Mills and Industry Award.
- National Tonnage Club Award.
- Hexamar Award, instituted by The Indian Society for Cotton Improvement (ISCI), Bombay.
- Vasvik Industrial Research Award for Agricultural Science & Technology, 1977.
- Posthumous NAU Lifetime Achievement Award May 2024

== Sources ==
- Indian Society for Cotton Improvement (ISCI), Mumbai.

== Honors and Legacy ==
Dr. C. T. Patel Gold Medals (2023): At Navsari Agricultural University’s 2023 convocation, meritorious students were honored with gold medals in Dr. Patel’s name, presented by the Governor of Gujarat, Shri Acharya Devvrat. This initiative, made possible by a donation from Dr. Patel’s elder son’s family, ensures that his vision continues to inspire new generations of agricultural scientists.

Posthumous NAU Lifetime Achievement Award in May 2024. On 1 May 2024, Navsari Agricultural University (NAU) posthumously awarded Dr. Chandrakant T. Patel a Lifetime Achievement Award during its 20th Foundation Day celebration. The award was received by his grandson, Shri Pareshbhai Patel, and granddaughter-in-law, Smt. Vona Patel. NAU Vice Chancellor Dr. Z.P. Patel performed a traditional ritual involving kumkum, tilak, and akshat (rice grains) as part of the presentation.
