= Ashmit Patel =

Indian actor (born 1978)

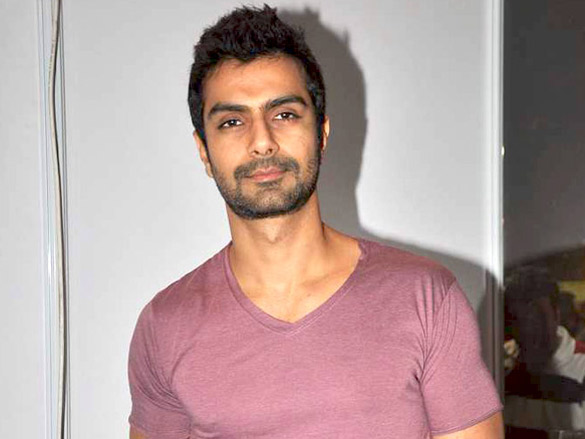
- Patel in 2015
- Born: 13 January 1978 (age 48); New Delhi, India
- Occupation: Actor
- Years active: 2002–present
- Partner: Mahek Chahal (2017–20)
- Relatives: Ameesha Patel (sister); Rajni Patel (grandfather)

Ashmit Patel (born 13 January 1978) is an Indian actor who works in Hindi films. Brother of the actress Ameesha Patel, he began his career as an assistant director and later progressed to leading roles in Bollywood productions. He was the second runner-up on the reality show Bigg Boss 4 (2010–11).

== Personal life ==
Patel is the son of Amit Patel and Asha Patel, and the younger brother of actress and model Ameesha Patel, and the grandson of the lawyer-politician Rajni Patel, who was the Congress Pradesh Committee President of Mumbai. His birth name is a blend of the first three letters of his mother's name Asha and the last three letters of his father's name Amit. His father is a Gujarati while his mother described herself as a "Sindhi Punjabi" in an interview.

Patel studied at the Cathedral and John Connon School in Mumbai and later attended the University of Texas at Austin in the United States, from which he received a bachelor's degree in Business in 2000. Patel is a Hindu and regularly practices yoga. In 2012, he turned to vegetarianism.

In 2005, Patel's visa application was rejected by Pakistani government which, according to him, was because of his intimate scenes with Pakistani actress Meera in Nazar (2005): "It was clearly a message that DON'T kiss our lady".

=== Relationships ===
In the mid-2000s, Patel was in relationship with his Silsiilay co-star Riya Sen. They broke up in 2006 after their MMS got leaked and created a scandal. Media reports in early 2010s extensively linked Patel with actresses Veena Malik and Sara Khan, but he denied any romantic relationships with them. Patel got engaged to Mahek Chahal in August 2017, but they called off their engagement in 2020.

== Career ==
Patel started his cinematic career as an assistant director and worked with Vikram Bhatt in the making of his films, Aap Mujhe Achche Lagne Lage (2002), Awara Paagal Deewana (2002), Raaz (2002) and Footpath (2003). He made his acting debut with the film Inteha directed by Vikram Bhatt. In 2004, he appeared alongside Mallika Sherawat and Emraan Hashmi in the thriller Murder, a Bollywood inspiration of Unfaithful. The film was his first commercial success.

In 2005, Patel starred in Soni Razdan's thriller Nazar and Khalid Mohammed's multi-starrer Silsiilay. Both the films were unsuccessful at the box office. In 2006, he also played significant roles in Dil Diya Hai, Banaras and Fight Club. In 2007, he starred in the comedy Kudiyon Ka Hai Zamana alongside Mahima Chaudhary and Rekha. His next film Toss was released in 2009.

Patel featured as one of the finalists in the fourth season of the Indian television reality show Bigg Boss. He hosted Superstud on UTV Bindass and working on two films, Good Night and Future Toh Bright Hai Jee.

He marked his digital debut with Ullu App's web-series titled Peshawar, which is based on 2014 Peshawar school massacre. He played the role of terrorist Abu Shamil, who masterminded the attacks and managed to brainwash the rest of his crew into perpetrating this heinous crime.

== Filmography ==
Year	Title	Role	Notes
2003	Inteha	Ranbir Oberoi / Vikram Rathore / Rakesh Sharma	
2004	Murder	Sudhir Saigal	
2005	Nazar	Rohan Sethi	
2005	Silsiilay	Nikhil Rai	
2006	Fight Club – Members Only	Dinesh	
2006	Banaras	Soham	
2006	Dil Diya Hai	Kunaal Malik	
2006	Kudiyon Ka Hai Zamana	Amar	
2009	Toss	Josh	
2013	Swabhoomi		
2013	Super Model	Vijay Malia/Monty	
2014	Jai Ho	Sumit	
2016	Dongari Ka Raja	Inspector Siddhanth	
2018	Nirdosh	Gautam Grover	

=== Assistant director ===
- Awara Paagal Deewana (2002) (second assistant director)
- Aap Mujhe Achche Lagne Lage (2002)
- Raaz (2002)
- Footpath (2003)

=== Television ===
Year	Show	Role	Notes
2007	Fear Factor India 2	Contestant	
2010–2011	Bigg Boss 4	Contestant	3rd place
2011	Superdude	Host	
2014–2015	Box Cricket League 1	Contestant	
2015–2016	Power Couple	Contestant	

=== Web series ===
Year	Title	Role	Notes	Ref(s)
2020	Peshawar	Abu Salim	4 episodes	
2020	The Bull of Dalal Street			
2021	Fatherhood		1 episode	
2021	Client no 7		2 episodes	
