= Ali Saleem =

Pakistani television personality (born 1979)

- علی سلیم
- Born: 1979 (age 46–47); Islamabad, Punjab, Pakistan
- Education: Cadet College Hasan Abdal, Froebel's International School
- Occupations: Talk show host; comedian; actor
- Years active: 2000–2023
- Known for: Comedy

Ali Saleem (Urdu: علی سلیم), best known by his alter-ego Begum Nawazish Ali, is a Pakistani television host, actor, scriptwriter, and impressionist. He became a contestant in Bigg Boss Season 4 in 2010. He broke into the mainstream audiences through his impersonations of the late prime minister Benazir Bhutto, and later playing the cross-dressing Begum Nawazish Ali on various television channels, including Aaj TV, Dawn News, and Geo TV.

His alter ego of Begum Nawazish Ali has now become his primary persona as he rarely appears as the male Ali Saleem. He is a bisexual man born to a retired colonel father in Pakistan Army and a former government official mother.

Biologically born a male, Ali has at times called himself gay, Khusra, bisexual, and transgender.

== Early life ==
Ali Saleem was born in Islamabad to a colonel in the Pakistan Army. From a young age, he desired and fantasized about being a woman. It was in his teens that he got to do a play for Yasmeen Ismail at the Arts Council clad in a burqa offering the audience with his monologue that people saw his inner lady come out. They would flock him and ask him in disbelief of how a child can impersonate a woman older than his age. Ali now says that because his audience was older than his age then, he felt he matured earlier. Saleem took his early life education from Cadet College Hasan Abdal, and later went to Froebel's International School for A-Level.

== Career ==
=== Being Ali Benazir ===
His breakthrough in the entertainment industry came when he started imitating his childhood heroine, the former Prime Minister of Pakistan Benazir Bhutto, from the way she talked to the way she dressed. So loved were his performances that on the occasion of Zohaib Hassan's dholki, Bhutto herself asked Saleem to impersonate her. Zohaib's sister Nazia had warned Saleem not imitate the prime minister. But, eventually, when asked he even made the prime minister Benazir Bhutto burst out in laughter and appreciated the performance.

=== Birth of Begum Nawazish Ali ===
His father and mother would soon seek a divorce, during which Saleem had to come to the city of Karachi. There he came to terms with Imran Aslam, a political satire writer who would tell him of a television channel in the pipeline, that would later be called Geo TV. Saleem's Benazir impressions were famous among his friends and Imran told him to take it to the airways with the television channel once it got aired. A show dealing with political humour around the time of election in the country. aptly named Hum Sub Umeed Se Hain (idiomatically translated as "We Are All Expecting (Pregnant)", but meant to translate as "We Are All Hopeful"). showed people impersonating the election candidates. Saleem did his Benazir act there for the first time on television.

After a while with the act, Saleem came to realise that the act alone would not shape his career and he had to do more with his talent. It was from this very act that Saleem gained the nickname BB or bibi meaning lady in Urdu. Omar Adil, an orthopaedic surgeon by profession, doctor to Noor Jehan, was a close friend of his. With an extensive research into Pakistani cinema under his belt and ties to multiple television channels, the doctor suggested Saleem with the idea of having a dragged-up character as a host for a talk show. Thus, the character of Begum Nawazish was conceived, and was thereon played by Saleem on and off since 2005.

=== Late Night with Begum Nawazish Ali ===
Saleem cross-dressed as a woman wearing a sari and asked influential guests provocative questions in his show Late Night with Begum Nawazish Ali. He would invite two guests at a time to be interviewed. The name Begum Nawazish Ali was suggested by Dr. Adil talking of his neighbour with the same name, wife to a colonel. Saleem could relate strongly to this persona as an alter ego. The facts that the Begum they created lived a wealthy life living off the money of her late military man husband and was a socialite, bore resemblance to the life Saleem himself had lived in his earlier days. The rights to the show were sold to Aaj TV, where the show aired every Saturday night.

==== Courting controversy ====
The show invited the likes of business tycoons, industrialists, actors and actresses, government and religious leaders. Begum would flirt with any one of the male guests "using suggestive banter and sexual innuendo". It was due to this use of gestures and acts that Begum earned a nasty reputation amongst the more fundamentalist ideals of the religious leaders (where some were even amused by his show) but he had still ventured into the hearts and minds of the younger generations. While talking of taboo topics like "sex" in Pakistan where it is strictly off-limits even trying to mention it, Saleem had been spared a backlash only because when on-the-air he is personifying a woman. Women, however, said that they were still afraid to do what Saleem was doing on the show.

Where television talk shows in Pakistan were reluctant to take on criticism for the military-backed Pakistani government, Begum had always been critical of a general seated as a president. Due to these critical claims, former Pakistani President Pervez Musharraf was opposed to the show's airing. This fair bit of opposition led to the temporary closure of the show. Offers however extended from across the border in India for a follow-up of the show by the name Begum. The reformatted show aired 26 episodes with Indian celebrities on the channel 9X from India.

=== The Late, Late Show With Ali Saleem ===
Saleem joined Dawn News with his latest show The Late, Late Show with Ali Saleem, hosting the show as himself. The first episode aired on 26 March 2016. Humayun Saeed, Nadeem Baig, and Mehwish Hayat appeared as guests on the first episode. The show aired its nineteenth and final episode on 5 June 2016.

=== Film career ===
In 2011, Saleem appeared in the Pakistani film Love Mein Ghum. In 2019, Saleem played a cameo role in Baaji, in which in he brought back his Begum Nawazish Ali character.

In March 2023, it was reported that a biopic based on Saleem's life is in the works, with Indian actress Mallika Sherawat being considered to play him.

== Legal troubles ==
Reportedly, on 26 May 2011, Saleem's mother Farzana Saleem called the capital city police and told them that her son has been torturing her. She was immediately taken to the hospital with a broken nose and other injuries on her body while Saleem was taken to police station. He told media personnel that there was some dispute going on within the family about property.

== Reality television ==
As contestant

Year	Show	Place	Channel
2010	Bigg Boss (season 4)	13th Place; Evicted Day 20	Colors
