= Bigg Boss (Hindi TV series) season 4 =

Bigg Boss
- Season 4
- Presented by: Salman Khan
- No. of days: 97
- No. of housemates: 16
- Winner: Shweta Tiwari
- Runner-up: Dalip Singh Rana
- No. of episodes: 98

Release
- Original network: Colors TV
- Original release: 3 October 2010 – 8 January 2011

Season chronology
- ← Previous; Season 3 Next → Season 5

Bigg Boss 4 is the fourth season of Indian reality TV show Bigg Boss, which aired on Colors TV from 3 October 2010. This season was longer than its predecessor, Bigg Boss 3 and lasted for 14 weeks (97 days) ending on 8 January 2011. Salman Khan joined the show for the first time as host and has subsequently hosted all the following seasons. This season became the highest-rated season with the finale TRP reaching 6.2 and the average TRP being 4.8.

During the launch on 3 October, fourteen hand-picked housemates entered the house located in Lonavala, a hill station, about 100 kilometres east of Mumbai in the Indian state of Maharashtra. Two additional wild card entries were made during the second and third weeks, taking the number of contestants to sixteen. The housemates, considered strangers to each other, spent 96 days (14 weeks) locked up together under the supervision of 32 cameras fitted around the house. Four of the housemates, Ashmit Patel, Dolly Bindra, The Great Khali and Shweta Tiwari, reached the final week, facing public vote. The show ended on 8 January 2011 with the grand finale. Shweta Tiwari emerged as the winner, going away with a prize money of ₹ 10 million, while The Great Khali was announced as the runner-up.

== Production ==
=== Development ===
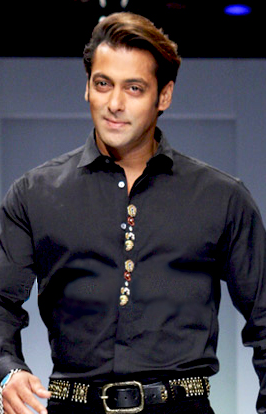
Salman Khan appointed as a host for the first

The season was announced in June 2010 by the makers and channel. Amitabh Bachchan, who presented the third season announced his departure from the show. Shahrukh Khan was first offered to host the series but he rejected it and was later replaced by Salman Khan. The final list of contestants was revealed on 2 October 2010.

=== Broadcast ===
The series was broadcast on Colors TV for the second time. Salman Khan presented the show on the weekends where a segment called 'Bigg Boss - Aapka Farmaan' was introduced and broadcast every Friday (eviction night) and Saturday. The finale was aired on 8 January 2011.

=== Casting ===
In July 2010, Sara Khan was roped in as the first housemate to enter. Khan quit her show Sapna Babul Ka... Bidaai to be a part of the series. In September 2010, Shweta Tiwari was roped in as the second housemate.

In September 2010, Kelly Brook rejected the show and was replaced by Veena Malik, who was confirmed last minute. Neetu Chandra, Shoaib Akhtar and Sania Mirza had also rejected the series as well.

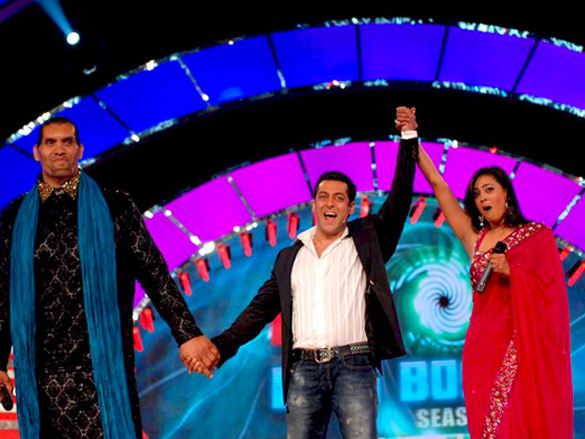
Shweta Tiwari became the first female to win the series

Wrestler The Great Khali was roped in as the first wild card entrant in October 2010. In November 2010, Pamela Anderson entered the show as a guest which spiked the rating up high.

=== Eye logo ===
The eye logo was revealed in September 2010 with colours contrasting of white, black and turquoise.

=== House ===
The house images were revealed in September 2010 with a big garden, dining area, living area, confession room and bedroom.

=== Release ===
In September 2010, a promo featuring Salman Khan was released. The music video promo of Bigg Boss 4 was later released in mid September 2010.

=== Controversies ===
- During the first week of the show's airing, activists of Shiv Sena, a political party, started protesting against the inclusion of Pakistani housemates in the show.
- One of the contestants, Sakshi Pradhan felt that she may be pregnant and spoke about her concern to fellow housemates Shweta Tiwari, Veena Malik and Sara Khan. However the video of the conversation was not aired. After receiving permission from Bigg Boss, Sakshi was allowed to leave the house for a short time to see a doctor.
- After being evicted from the house, Rahul Bhatt claimed that Bigg Boss is scripted.
- In November 2010, the Information and Broadcasting Ministry served a stay order to Colors, due to complaints of indecent exposure aired on national television, asking the channel to change the timings of the show from 9 PM to 11.30 PM. The channel later got a stay order from Bombay High Court allowing them to continue the telecast of the show during prime time.

== Housemates status ==
Sr	Housemate	Day entered	Day exited	Status
1	Shweta	Day 1	Day 97	Winner
2	Khali	Day 14	Day 97	1st runner-up
3	Ashmit	Day 1	Day 97	2nd runner-up
4	Dolly	Day 21	Day 45	Ejected
4	Dolly	Day 56	Day 97	3rd runner-up
5	Samir	Day 1	Day 45	Ejected
5	Samir	Day 49	Day 95	Evicted
6	Veena	Day 1	Day 91	Evicted
7	Seema	Day 1	Day 77	Evicted
8	Sara	Day 1	Day 70	Evicted
9	Manoj	Day 1	Day 63	Evicted
10	Hrishant	Day 1	Day 56	Evicted
11	Anchal	Day 1	Day 42	Evicted
12	Rahul	Day 1	Day 35	Evicted
13	Begum	Day 1	Day 21	Evicted
14	Sakshi	Day 1	Day 14	Evicted
15	Abbas	Day 1	Day 7	Evicted
16	Devender	Day 1	Day 1	Ejected

== Housemates ==
=== Original entrants ===
- Mrs Shweta Tiwari – Indian television star. Shweta is well known for playing the famous role of Prerna in the popular Ekta Kapoor longest running serial Kasautii Zindagii Kay which aired on Star Plus.
- Abbas Kazmi – Ajmal Kasab's renowned Lawyer.
- Samir Soni – Bollywood actor. He is known for his roles in films like Kabhie Tum Kabhie Hum and Vivah. He also appeared in the popular drama series Jassi Jaissi Koi Nahin. He won the Most Stylish Housemate award in the finale, a Chevrolet car as the prize.
- Seema Parihar – Indian politician. She has also acted in Wounded – a film based on her real-life story.
- Ashmit Patel – Bollywood actor. He is known for his role in films like Murder and Silsilay. Actress Ameesha Patel is his sister.
- Ali Saleem – Pakistani TV anchor. He cross-dresses as a woman wearing a sari and asks influential guests provocative questions in his show Late Night with Begum Nawazish Ali.
- Sakshi Pradhan – Reality TV Star. She is the winner of the second season of the reality show MTV Splitsvilla.
- Devender Singh ( also known as Bunty Chor) – Criminal. He has been accused of robbery and was on the most wanted list of the Delhi police. Dibakar Banerjee has made a film on him, Oye Lucky! Lucky Oye!, where Abhay Deol played the protagonist.
- Rahul Bhatt – Actor. He is the son of Mahesh Bhatt and brother of Alia Bhatt.
- Sara Khan – TV Actress. She rose the fame of Sadhana from the Star Plus popular show Sapna Babul Ka...Bidaai.
- Anchal Kumar – Model.
- Hrishant Goswami – Model. He is the winner of the 2004 Gladrags Manhunt contest.
- Veena Malik – Pakistani actress and model. She has appeared in many films like Tere Pyar Mein, Pind Di Kudi and Kyun Tum Se Itna Pyar Hai in the Pakistani industry.
- Manoj Tiwari – Bhojpuri actor and politician. He has appeared in over 50 films in the industry.

=== Wild card entries ===
- Dalip Singh Rana (also known as The Great Khali) – Wrestler.
- Dolly Bindra – Actress.

=== Guests entrants ===
Throughout the series various guests may appear from time to time for a visit.

- Ali Merchant stayed in the house as a guest from day 30 to day 41.
- Pamela Anderson entered the house on 16 November 2010 and stayed for 3 days.

== Guest appearances ==
Week	Day	Guest(s)	Purpose of Visit	Ref(s)
Premiere	Day 1	Kashmera Shah	Special appearances from Season 1	
Premiere	Day 1	Rakhi Sawant	Special appearances from Season 1	
Premiere	Day 1	Ravi Kishan	Special appearances from Season 1	
Premiere	Day 1	Sambhavna Seth	Special appearances from Season 2	
Premiere	Day 1	Bhakhtyar Irani	Special appearances from Season 3	
Premiere	Day 1	Tannaz Irani	Special appearances from Season 3	
Premiere	Day 1	Raju Srivastav	Special appearances from Season 3	
Premiere	Day 1	Vindu Dara Singh	Special appearances from Season 3	
Premiere	Day 1	Palak Tiwari	To support mother Shweta Tiwari	
Week 1	Day 6	Ajay Devgn	To promote his film Aakrosh	
Week 2	Day 13	John Abraham & Pakhi Tyrewala	To promote their film Jhootha Hi Sahi	
Week 3	Day 20	Anupam Kher	To promote his film Nakshatra	
Week 4	Day 27	Akshay Kumar	To promote his film Action Replayy	
Week 5	Day 33	Shashank Vyas, Pratyusha Banerjee, Mahhi Vij, Rashami Desai, Tina Datta, Nandish Sandhu & Vishal Karwal	From Colors shows to celebrate Diwali	
Week 5	Day 34	Rohit Shetty, Ajay Devgn, Kareena Kapoor, Tusshar Kapoor, Shreyas Talpade & Kunal Khemu	To promote their film Golmaal 3	
Week 6	Day 39	Ali & Sara's family	To attend Ali and Sara's wedding	
Week 6	Day 39	Jay Bhanushali, Krystle D'Souza, Abigail Jain, Vishal Singh, Jatin Shah & Vicky Jain	To attend Ali and Sara's wedding	
Week 6	Day 41	Gaurav Chaudhary & Shalini Chandran	To promote their show Rishton Se Badi Pratha	
Week 7	Day 47	Imran Khan & Kunal Kohli	To promote their film Break Ke Baad	
Week 8	Day 55	Arbaaz Khan & Sonakshi Sinha	To celebrate the success of Dabangg	
Week 9	Day 61	Anil Kapoor & Akshaye Khanna	To promote their film No Problem	
Week 10	Day 69	Ekta Kapoor	To promote her film Ragini MMS	
Week 11	Day 76	Farah Khan & Katrina Kaif	To promote their film Tees Maar Khan	
Week 12	Day 79	Neelam Kothari	To support her husband Samir	
Week 12	Day 79	Asha Patel	To support her son Ashmit	
Week 12	Day 79	Harminder Kaur	To support her husband Dalip	
Week 12	Day 79	Palak Tiwari	To support her mother Shweta	
Week 12	Day 83	Rani Mukerji & Vidya Balan	To promote their film No One Killed Jessica	
Week 13	Day 90	Dharmendra & Bobby Deol	To promote their film Yamla Pagla Deewana	
Week 14	Day 97	R. Madhavan & Kangana Ranaut	To promote their film Tanu Weds Manu	

== Weekly summary ==
The main events in the house are summarised in the table below. A typical week began with nominations, followed by the shopping task, and then the eviction of a housemate during the Saturday episode. Evictions, tasks, and other events for a particular week are noted in order of sequence.

Week 1	Entrances	Day 1: Shweta, Abbas, Samir, Seema, Ashmit, Sakshi, Devender, Rahul, Sara, Anchal, Hrishant, Veena & Manoj entered the main house.
Week 1	Captain	Day 1: Bigg Boss asked the housemates to vote for the first house captain. The twist was that Bigg Boss asked them to vote but all housemates thought it was for the first eviction. They later found out it was for the first captain. As Devender got the majority votes, he was elected as the first house captain.
Week 1	Nominations	Day 2: Housemates had to nominate two other housemates. As a result; Seema, Abbas, Sara and Hrishant were nominated for eviction. Bunty was later nominated by Bigg Boss for consistently breaking the rules of the house.
Week 1	Tasks	Samay Dhere Dhere Chal: Each housemate has to take care of the hour glass and ensure that sand constantly flows.; Begum's Talk Show: Bigg Boss gave a mini task which was a chat show with Begum and the 4 nominated housemates. Transformation from Ali to Begum is no small occasion and all the women inmates got together to help her.
Week 1	Reward	—
Week 1	Twists	After getting evicted, Abbas had to nominate two housemates for the second week eviction. He chose to nominate Seema and Veena.
Week 1	Exits	Day 2: Devender was ejected from the house due to his violent and bad behaviour, abusing and cursing Bigg Boss, breaking rules of the house and trying to cover the cameras by socks.; Day 5: Abbas was evicted from the house after facing the public vote.
Week 2	Entrances	Day 13: Dalip Singh Rana entered the house as the first wild card entrant.
Week 2	Captain	Day 7: Bigg Boss asked for two names for the next house captain for the second week. The housemates decided that Nawazish and Samir will be participating for the next captain. As Nawazish had the majority votes, he was the next house captain for the second week.
Week 2	Nominations	Day 8: Housemates had to nominate two other housemates. As a result; Sakshi, Seema and Samir were nominated for eviction. Sakshi was already nominated by captain Nawazish.
Week 2	Tasks	Shakti De Bhakti De Mukti De: The housemates had to wear a white gown and hat and chant, on a particular music. Once the music is over, then they need to say one good and bad point about the inmate on their right.
Week 2	Punishments	—
Week 2	Reward	—
Week 2	Twists	After getting evicted, Sakshi had to pick one housemate she would like to nominate for the third week eviction. She chose to nominate Nawazish.
Week 2	Exits	Day 12: Sakshi was evicted from the house after facing the public vote.
Week 3	Entrances	Day 21: Dolly Bindra entered as the second wild card entrant.
Week 3	Captain	Day 11: Bigg Boss asked Samir to pick two housemates for the next house captain for the third week. He chose Ashmit and Rahul. As Rahul got the majority votes, he was elected as the next captain.
Week 3	Nominations	Day 15: Bigg Boss asked the housemates to nominate on housemate for eviction. Shweta was nominated by captain Rahul. As a result; Nawazish, Shweta and Veena were nominated for eviction.
Week 3	Tasks	Dhan Dhana Dhan!: All housemates have to print notes. Each note is worth 1000 points. Housemates have to accumulate a total of 50,00,000 points in notes. Hrishant and Shweta have been given task to rob 15,00,000 points.
Week 3	Tasks	Passed – Hrishant and Shweta
Week 3	Tasks	Failed – Other Housemates
Week 3	Tasks	Dixcy Scot: There is a wrestling match between the male housemates. Dalip is the referee and consultant. Female participants are the cheerleaders, except for Shweta, who was the presenter along with Nawazish.
Week 3	Tasks	Passed – Manoj
Week 3	Tasks	Failed – Other Male Housemates
Week 3	Punishments	Day 17: Rahul was punished and was asked to wash all clothes of the other housemates, after he failed to enforce Bigg Boss rules in his captaincy.
Week 3	Reward	—
Week 3	Twists	After getting evicted, Nawazish was asked to nominate one housemate. Nawazish nominated Veena and Sara.
Week 3	Exits	Day 19: Nawazish was evicted from the house after facing the public vote.
Week 4	Nominations	Day 22: Housemates had to nominate two other housemates for eviction. Sara was directly nominated by captain Manoj. As a result; Sara, Samir and Dalip were nominated.
Week 4	Captain	Day 17: Bigg Boss asked Manoj to name two housemates for the next house captain for the fourth week. He named himself and Samir. Manoj was elected as the next house captain after getting majority votes.
Week 4	Tasks	BB Rhyming: Dolly and Manoj were chosen as judge by the Bigg Boss for rhyming play. The teams were: Team A: Samir & Shweta Team B: Hrishant & Seema Team C: Ashmit & Veena
Week 4	Tasks	Passed – Team B, Hrishant & Seema
Week 4	Tasks	Failed – Other Housemates
Week 4	Punishments	—
Week 4	Reward	—
Week 4	Twists	Day 26: Bigg Boss staged a fake eviction process and sent Sara to a secret room.; After her fake eviction, Sara was asked to nominate two housemates for the fifth week eviction. She nominated Dolly and Samir.
Week 4	Exits	Day 26: Sara was asked to leave the house but was sent to a secret room and resulted to the eviction being cancelled.
Week 5	Entrances	Day 30: Ali Merchant entered as a guest entrant.
Week 5	Nominations	Day 29: Bigg Boss cancelled the nomination procedure and nominated those contestants who have been breaking this rule. As a result; Manoj, Hrishant, Anchal, Veena, Rahul, Seema & Shweta were nominated.
Week 5	Captain	Day 25: Bigg Boss asks Shweta to name two housemates for the next house captain. She chose Ashmit and Hrishant. Later with majority votes, Ashmit was elected as the new captain.
Week 5	Tasks	Aa Pappiyaan Jhappiyan Pa Le: The house is transformed into a puppy care centre. Bigg Boss asks six contestants to become puppies while five contestants are asked to work as their caretakers. Mandira was the supervisor of the task.; Caretaker / Puppy; Shweta / Dalip; Hrishant / Veena; Ashmit / Sara; Seema / Dolly; Samir / Manoj; Other Tasks: Dolly and Seema were assigned a task to make gajar ka halwa and who ever makes the best will be the winner and will be the chef for Ali and Sara's wedding.
Week 5	Tasks	Passed – Seema
Week 5	Tasks	Failed – Dolly
Week 5	Punishments	Bigg Boss punishes and nominated those housemates who broke the rules most of the time.
Week 5	Reward	—
Week 5	Twists	Day 31: Bigg Boss announced that Ali and Sara will get married inside the house which was a surprise.; After getting evicted, Rahul had to nominate two housemates. He nominated Veena and Sara.
Week 5	Exits	Day 33: Rahul was evicted from the house after facing the public vote.
Week 6	Nominations	Day 36: Bigg Boss asked the housemates to nominate two other names for eviction. Anchal was directly nominated by captain Hrishant. As a result; Anchal, Dolly and Ashmit were nominated.
Week 6	Captain	Day 32: Bigg Boss asked Anchal to name two housemates for the next house captain; she chose Hrishant and Samir. Hrishant was elected as the next house captain with majority votes.
Week 6	Tasks	Ali and Sara's wedding: Ali and Sara are getting married and Bigg Boss assigns tasks to make it go all good for the couple. It includes, mehendi, clothes, haldi ceremony and the big wedding day.
Week 6	Punishments	—
Week 6	Reward	—
Week 6	Twists	After getting evicted, Anchal had to nominate two housemates for next week's eviction. She nominated Veena and Sara.
Week 6	Exits	Day 40: Anchal was evicted from the house after facing the public vote. Ali left the house as his guest duration days were finished.
Week 7	Entrances	Day 44: Pamela Anderson entered the house as a guest entrant.
Week 7	Nominations	Day 43: Bigg Boss asked the housemates to nominate two other names for eviction. Dolly was directly nominated by captain Shweta. As a result; Dolly, Sara and Dalip were nominated.
Week 7	Captain	Day 41: Bigg Boss asked Veena to name two housemates for the next house captain; she chose herself and Shweta. Shweta was elected as the next house captain with majority votes.
Week 7	Tasks	Wazan Ghatao Tandrusti Badhao: The housemates have to decrease their weight through exercises. Dalip will act as the PT instructor.
Week 7	Punishments	—
Week 7	Reward	—
Week 7	Twists	Day 47: Salman Khan announced there was no eviction.
Week 7	Exits	Day 45: Dolly and Samir were ejected from the house following a huge fight in which they broke most of the rules.; Day 48: Pamela left the house as her guest duration days was completed.
Week 8	Entrances	Day 49: Samir Soni re-entered the house
Week 8	Nominations	Day 50: Bigg Boss asked the housemates to nominate two other names for eviction. As a result, Ashmit, Hrishant, Samir, Shweta and Veena were nominated.
Week 8	Captain	Day 49: Bigg Boss asked Manoj to name two housemates for the next house captain; he chose Dalip and Seema. Seema was elected as the next house captain with majority votes.
Week 8	Tasks	Gaon Gaon Shahar Shahar: Bigg Boss has given a task to the leftover contestants of the house that they have to portray the characters of hardcore villagers and modern city people. Bigg Boss has divided them into two teams. The village team is composed of Shweta, Samir, Veena and is headed by Ashmit. The modern city people team is headed by Seema and composed of Sara, Hrishant, Manoj and Khali. The city people have to stay inside the house and dress in a modern way and eat only continental food, whereas the villagers have to stay in the garden area, dress in the village garb and eat food made on stoves. Both the teams have to remain in their respective areas, which is defined by the ‘Lakshman Rekha’.; Villagers / Modern; Ashmit / Seema; Samir / Hrishant; Veena / Manoj; Shweta / Sara; Samir / Dalip; Bigg Boss said both teams failed the task as many violated the rules.
Week 8	Punishments	—
Week 8	Reward	—
Week 8	Twists	After getting evicted, Hrishant had to nominate two housemates for next week's eviction. He nominated Shweta and Samir.
Week 8	Exits	Day 54: Hrishant was evicted from the house after facing the public vote.
Week 9	Entrances	Day 57: Dolly Bindra re-entered the house.
Week 9	Nominations	Day 57: Bigg Boss asked the housemates to nominate two other names for eviction. Captain Dalip had to nominate one housemate directly for nomination. He chose to nominate Veena. Later Dolly was given a special power to save a housemate. She saved Veena. As a result; Ashmit and Manoj were nominated.
Week 9	Captain	Day 53: Bigg Boss asked Seema to name two housemates for the next house captain; she chose Dalip and Manoj. Dalip was elected as the next house captain with majority votes.
Week 9	Tasks	Paathshala: Housemates are given school uniform and have to appear like school kids. Seema is made the principal while Manoj and Ashmit are made the Hindi and English teachers respectively.
Week 9	Punishments	—
Week 9	Reward	—
Week 9	Twists	After getting evicted, Manoj had to nominate two housemates for next week's eviction. He nominated Sara and Samir.
Week 9	Exits	Day 61: Manoj was evicted from the house after facing the public vote.
Week 10	Nominations	Day 64: Bigg Boss asked the housemates to nominate two other names for eviction. Captain Dolly had to nominate one housemate directly for nomination. She chose to nominate Sara. As a result; Sara, Veena and Samir were nominated.
Week 10	Captain	Day 60: Bigg Boss asked Dolly to name two housemates for the next house captain; she chose herself and Veena. Dolly was elected as the next house captain with majority votes.
Week 10	Tasks	Jaago Ghar Walon Warna Waat Lag Jaaegi: The housemates will be allowed to sleep between 4am and 12 noon and two contestants will be nominated to perform a certain task in the garden area. The task is to counter-balance one's weight with the corresponding weight provided by Bigg Boss. A giant weighing scale has been provided in the garden area for the task. The first pair to try the task was Sara and Shweta.
Week 10	Punishments	—
Week 10	Reward	—
Week 10	Twists	After getting evicted, Sara had to save one housemate for next week's eviction. She saved Ashmit.
Week 10	Exits	Day 68: Sara was evicted from the house after facing the public vote.
Week 11	Nominations	Day 71: Captain Dalip had to nominate two housemates who will directly get nominated. As a result; Seema & Samir were nominated.
Week 11	Captain	Day 66: Bigg Boss asked Dolly to name three housemates for the next house captain; she chose herself, Dalip and Seema. On Day 67, Dalip was elected as the next house captain with majority votes.
Week 11	Tasks	Haath Choota Toh Kismat Phooti: The housemates will be divided into three pairs. The first pair will be Ashmit and Shweta, second pair will be Dolly and Veena and the third pair will be Samir and Seema. The housemates will be tied together with a handcuff and one member of each pair has to wear a blindfold and keep an egg on his hand all the time.; Other Tasks: Shweta and Ashmit are given secret task to hide important things of Veena and Dolly, which they succeed and earn 300 points each.
Week 11	Punishments	Day 71: Bigg Boss took back the captaincy from Dalip due to breaking of house rules by the housemates. Dalip is asked to make food for all the contestants as a punishment.
Week 11	Reward	—
Week 11	Twists	After getting evicted, Seema had to nominate two housemates for next week's eviction. She nominated Dalip and Veena.
Week 11	Exits	Day 75: Seema was evicted from the house after facing the public vote.
Week 12	Nominations	Day 78: Bigg Boss asked the housemates to nominate two other names for eviction. As a result; Ashmit, Veena and Dalip were nominated.
Week 12	Captain	Day 77: Bigg Boss asked the housemates to vote between Ashmit and Shweta for the next captain. Shweta was elected as the last house captain of the season with majority votes.
Week 12	Tasks	As a result of previous week's mistakes, Bigg Boss has not provided any flour and housemates have to grind it themselves using chakki. They will also feed Khali as he has been directed not to take any food item by himself.; This week housemates have to save water to promote save water campaign. Water will come in limited amount in the morning and evening hours. Housemates have been provided buckets to store water for daily works.
Week 12	Punishments	—
Week 12	Reward	—
Week 12	Twists	After getting evicted, Veena had to save one housemate for week 13 nominations. She saved Ashmit.
Week 12	Exits	Day 82: Veena was evicted from the house after facing the public vote.
Week 13	Nominations	Day 85: Bigg Boss asked to nominate one housemate for this week's eviction. As a result; Dolly, Samir and Shweta were nominated.
Week 13	Tasks	Bigg Boss Ki Kahani, Hamari Zabani: Housemates have to enact different past events which took place in the house. The task will continue for three days; housemates will act on three different themes namely fights, laughters and love.
Week 13	Punishments	—
Week 13	Reward	—
Week 13	Twists	–
Week 13	Exits	Day 89: Samir was evicted from the house after facing the public vote.
Week 14	Nominations	Day 94: Bigg Boss asked the remaining contestants; Ashmit, Dolly, Khali and Shweta to nominate one housemate who they would like to evict from the house. As the other housemates got confused, Ashmit volunteered his own name. Bigg Boss announced that Ashmit will remain in the house and he would get a cash prize of Rs. 5 lakhs, regardless if he wins the show or not.
Week 14	Tasks	Jee Lay Jee Jaan Sey: Each housemate will be given a specific song every day and they have to dance on it. During the task duration, all the housemates put together can sleep for total of 60 hours.
Week 14	Happenings	Day 92: Bigg Boss announces no nominations and that all were nominated for the final results.; Day 93: Bigg Boss assigned a new and last task for the season.; Day 94: Bigg Boss announced a shocking twist for the four remaining housemates.; Day 95: Bigg Boss announced the finalists of season 4 and hosted a party for them.; Day 96: The four finalists gear up for the finale.
Week 14	Finalists	
Week 14	3rd runner-up	Dolly Bindra
Week 14	2nd runner-up	Ashmit Patel
Week 14	1st runner-up	Dalip Singh Rana
Week 14	Winner	Shweta Tiwari

== Nomination table ==
	Week 1	Week 2	Week 3	Week 4	Week 5	Week 6	Week 7	Week 8	Week 9	Week 10	Week 11	Week 12	Week 13	Week 14		
	Week 1	Week 2	Week 3	Week 4	Week 5	Week 6	Week 7	Week 8	Week 9	Week 10	Week 11	Week 12	Week 13	Day 94	Day 97	
Nominated for Captaincy	All Housemates	All Housemates	Rahul; Shweta	All Housemates	Ashmit; Dolly; Hrishant; Shweta	Hrishant; Samir	Shweta; Veena	Dalip; Seema	Dalip; Manoj	Dolly; Veena	Dalip; Dolly; Seema	Ashmit; Shweta	No; Captain			
House Captain	~~Devinder~~	Begum	Rahul	Manoj	Ashmit	Hrishant	Shweta	Seema	Dalip	Dolly	Dalip	Shweta	No; Captain			
Captain's Nomination	Refused to vote	Sakshi	Shweta	Sara	No; Nominations	Anchal	Dolly	Ashmit	Veena	Sara	Samir; Seema	Ashmit; Veena	No; Captain			
Vote to:	Evict				None	Evict									WIN	
Shweta	Seema; Abbas	Rahul; Manoj	Anchal	Sara, Ashmit	No; Nominations	Dolly; Ashmit	House; Captain	Ashmit; Veena	Ashmit; Sara	Veena; Dalip	No; Nominations	House; Captain	Dolly	Ashmit	No; Nominations	Winner (Day 96)
Dalip	Not In House		Exempt	Samir; Sara	No; Nominations	Veena; Samir	Sara; Hrishant	Ashmit; Hrishant	House; Captain	Shweta; Seema	House; Captain	Ashmit; Veena	Samir	Ashmit	No; Nominations	1st runner-up (Day 96)
Ashmit	Sakshi; Seema	Samir; Shweta	Veena	Samir; Seema	House; Captain	Dolly; Manoj	Dalip; Manoj	Shweta; Manoj	Shweta; Manoj	Samir; Seema	Exempt	Dolly; Dalip	Dolly	Ashmit	No; Nominations	2nd runner-up (Day 96)
Dolly	Not In House			Anchal; Veena	No; Nominations	Veena; Ashmit	Hrishant; Sara	Ejected (Day 45)	Veena (to save)	House; Captain	No; Nominations	Ashmit; Samir	Shweta	Ashmit	No; Nominations	3rd runner-up (Day 96)
Samir	Hrishant; Rahul	Hrishant; Ashmit	Veena	Ashmit; Sara	No; Nominations	Dolly; Ashmit	Sara; Veena	Sara; Veena	Sara; Ashmit	Ashmit; Veena	No; Nominations	Ashmit; Veena	Dolly	Evicted (Day 90)		
Samir	Hrishant; Rahul	Hrishant; Ashmit	Veena	Ashmit; Sara	No; Nominations	Dolly; Ashmit	Ejected (Day 45)	Sara; Veena	Sara; Ashmit	Ashmit; Veena	No; Nominations	Ashmit; Veena	Dolly	Evicted (Day 90)		
Veena	Seema; Sara	Samir; Rahul	Sara	Rahul; Seema	No; Nominations	Shweta; Samir	Dalip; Seema	Samir; Shweta	Manoj; Seema	Shweta; Samir	No; Nominations	Dalip; Dolly	Ashmit (to save)	Evicted (Day 83)		
Seema	Begum; Sara	Anchal; Manoj	Hrishant	Samir; Sara	No; Nominations	Dolly; Ashmit	Ashmit; Hrishant	House; Captain	Ashmit; Manoj	Veena; Ashmit	No; Nominations	Dalip; Veena (to evict)	Evicted (Day 76)			
Sara	Hrishant; Anchal	Rahul; Seema	Veena	Samir; Seema	~~Dolly~~; ~~Samir~~; ~~(to evict)~~ Secret Room (Days 26–28)	Veena; Manoj	Dalip; Seema	Dalip; Veena	Manoj; Ashmit	Dalip; Veena	Ashmit (to save)	Evicted (Day 69)				
Manoj	Seema; Abbas	Shweta; Seema	Sara	House; Captain	No; Nominations	Dalip; Ashmit	Sara; Ashmit	Ashmit; Hrishant	Ashmit; Sara	Samir; Sara (to evict)	Evicted (Day 62)					
Hrishant	Seema; Abbas	Seema; Samir	Veena	Samir; Sara	No; Nominations	House; Captain	Samir; Dalip	Shweta; Samir	Shweta; Samir (to evict)	Evicted (Day 55)						
Anchal	Sakshi; Sara	Samir; Seema	Shweta	Sara; Samir	No; Nominations	Dolly; Shweta	Veena; Sara (to evict)	Evicted (Day 41)								
Rahul	Veena; Shweta	Veena; Sara	House; Captain	Veena; Sara	No; Nominations	Veena; Sara (to evict)	Evicted (Day 34)									
Begum	Seema; Manoj	House; Captain	Samir	Dalip (to evict)	Evicted (Day 20)											
Sakshi	Seema; Hrishant	Hrishant; Aanchal	Begum (to evict)	Evicted (Day 13)												
Abbas	Seema; Begum	Seema; Veena (to evict)	Evicted (Day 6)													
Bunty	House; Captain	Ejected (Day 1)														
Notes	1	2	3	4	5	6	7	None	8	9	10	None	11	12		
Against Public Vote	Abbas; ~~Devinder~~; Hrishant; Sara; Seema	Sakshi; Samir; Seema	Begum; Shweta; Veena	Dalip; Samir; Sara	Anchal; Hrishant; Manoj; Rahul; Seema; Shweta; Veena	Anchal; Ashmit; Dolly	Dalip; Dolly; Sara	Ashmit; Hrishant; Samir; Shweta; Veena	Ashmit; Manoj; ~~Veena~~	Samir; Sara; Veena	Samir; Seema	Ashmit; Dalip; Veena	Dolly; Samir; Shweta	Ashmit; Dalip; Dolly; Shweta		
Secret Room	none				Sara	none										
Re-entered	none						Samir	Dolly	none							
Ejected	Devender	none					Dolly	none								
Ejected	Devender	none					Samir	none								
Evicted	Abbas	Sakshi	Begum	No eviction	Rahul	Anchal	Eviction Cancelled	Hrishant	Manoj	Sara	Seema	Veena	Samir	No eviction	Dolly	Ashmit
Evicted	Abbas	Sakshi	Begum	No eviction	Rahul	Anchal	Eviction Cancelled	Hrishant	Manoj	Sara	Seema	Veena	Samir	No eviction	Dalip	Shweta

Color Key

indicates the House Captain.
indicates that the Housemate was directly nominated for eviction prior to the regular nominations process.
indicates that the housemate has Re-Entered.
indicates that the person was saved by another housemate.
indicates that the housemate has been granted immunity from nominations.
indicates that the housemate was in the caravan or secret room.
indicates that the housemate entered as a wild card entrant.
indicates that the housemate has been declared as the winner.
indicates that the housemate has been declared as the first runner-up.
indicates that the housemate has been declared as the second runner-up.
indicates that the housemate has been declared as the third runner-up.
indicates the contestant has been evicted.
indicates the contestant has been walked out of the show.
indicates the housemate was ejected.

=== Nomination notes ===
- ^1: On Day 2, Devender who became the first house captain got his captaincy revoked and also was thrown out of the house after he violated the rules.
- ^2: On Day 8, captain Begum was given a special power to nominate someone directly for second week's eviction. He chose Sakshi.
- ^3: After Dalip made his first wild cards entry, he was exempt and saved from the third week's nomination process.
- ^4: Bigg Boss announced a twist where it was revealed that Sara had got evicted but instead she entered the secret room therefore there was no eviction.
- ^5: Bigg Boss cancelled the nomination procedure and nominated those housemates directly who repeatedly broke the rules.
- ^6: Captain Hrishant had directly nominated Anchal for eviction hence no housemate could vote.
- ^7: Captain Shweta had directly nominated Dolly for eviction hence no housemate could vote.
- ^8: After returning, Dolly saved Veena from nominations.
- ^9: Captain Dolly had directly nominated Sara for eviction hence no housemate could vote.
- ^10: Only Captain Dalip was eligible to nominate two housemates directly for eviction.
- ^11: On Day 82, Veena used her special power to save Ashmit from nominations.
- ^12: Shweta was announced as the winner but Ashmit had received 5 lakhs as he voluntarily chose his own name to take the money.

== Ratings ==
- According to data available with aMap, a television viewership monitoring agency, the opening episode of Bigg Boss 4 on Colors got a rating of 3.6. Season 3 had average rating of 2.43 while Bigg Boss 1 and Bigg Boss 2 had average ratings of 1.96 and 2.03. While Bigg Boss 1 was anchored by Arshad Warsi, Shilpa Shetty hosted Bigg Boss 2 and Amitabh Bachchan for Bigg Boss 3.
- The Grand Finale episode on 8 January 2011, received a TRP of 6.7, which was the highest among the finale of other Indian reality shows such as Kaun Banega Crorepati, Rahul Dulhaniya Le Jayega, MasterChef and DID –Li'l Masters.

== Game ==
Bigg Boss 4, a mobile video game based on the fourth season was released by Indiagames.
