= Rajni Patel =

Indian politician (1915-1982)

- Born: 9 January 1915; Sarsa, Bombay Presidency, British India (present-day Gujarat, India)
- Died: 3 May 1982 (aged 67)
- Occupations: Barrister, politician
- Political party: Indian National Congress
- Spouse: Bakul Patel
- Relatives: Ameesha Patel (granddaughter); Ashmit Patel (grandson) Chandrakant T. Patel (Cousin) Who developed the first commercial cotton hybrid, known as Hybrid-4 (Sankar-4), in 1970.

Rajni Patel (9 January 1915 – 3 May 1982) was an Indian politician and barrister. He is well known for being a member of the group of top lawyers that defended Naval Commander Kawas Manekshaw Nanavati in the Prem Ahuja Murder case.

Rajni Patel was real-cousin of Dr. Chandrakant T Patel-a great cotton scientist who invented world's first hybrid cotton in the world. Rajni Patel is grandfather of Bollywood actress Ameesha Patel and actor Ashmit Patel.

== Life ==
He was born in Sarsa, near Anand, in Bombay Presidency, British India on 9 January 1915. He participated in the Swadeshi Movement launched by Mahatma Gandhi and was jailed in his early teens for picketing outside liquor shops. He went to the UK for higher studies in the early 1930s. In 1939, he qualified as a barrister from London and practiced in Mumbai. In London, he came in contact with Jawaharlal Nehru who encouraged Rajni to travel to the US and other places to gather support for the Indian independence movement. When Rajni returned to Mumbai by ship, Nehru stood at the Gateway of India to receive him. However, the British authorities did not permit him to disembark and instead arrested him on the ship and took him to Nashik jail.

After his career as a barrister, Patel joined the Indian National Congress in the late 1960s. He had been close to then Prime Minister Indira Gandhi. In the early 1970s, he was made the president of the Mumbai Pradesh Congress Committee.

The Nehru Centre situated in Worli, Mumbai, was conceptualized by him in 1972. The Centre consists of a planetarium, an art gallery, a permanent exposition called, "Discovery of India," and a science laboratory for students.

He married Bakul Patel, who later became sheriff of Mumbai in 1992. Bollywood actress Ameesha Patel is his granddaughter. He died on 3 May 1982.

== Recognition ==
In 1986, a forked road off Marine Drive at Nariman Point area in Mumbai was named after him.

== Literature ==
His wife has written a memoir entitled, "Remembering Rajni."
