= Kudiyon Ka Hai Zamana =

2006 Indian film

- Directed by: Amar Butala
- Written by: Amar Butala
- Produced by: Mejoo Khan and Amar Butala
- Starring: Rekha; Mahima Chaudhry; Vasundhara Das; Kim Sharma; Ashmit Patel
- Cinematography: A.K.N. Sebastian
- Edited by: Vijay Mengle
- Music by: Iqbal Darbar; Yasin Darbar; Lyrics: Sahil Sultanpuri and A.m. Turaz
- Release date: 5 January 2006
- Running time: 121 minutes
- Country: India
- Language: Hindi

Kudiyon Ka Hai Zamana (Translation: It's a Woman's Era) is a Bollywood comedy film directed by Amar Batula. Released on 5 January 2006, it stars Mahima Chaudhry, Rekha, and Ashmit Patel. The main premise revolves around four female friends and their problems with boyfriends and husbands. The film has been compared to Sex and the City.

== Plot ==
Mayuri, Kanika, Natasha, and Anjali have been friends for many years. All of them come from very wealthy families. While Mayuri has been married four times, she still has feelings for her first husband, Girish, and keeps aloof from her current spouse, Akash; Natasha is married to Punit and is expecting a child; Kanika is preparing to marry Rahul; and Anjali, who is 24, is unmarried. All four constantly bet large sums of money on trivial issues, mostly involving men, but only Anjali keeps winning. On the eve of Kanika's marriage, she, along with Mayuri and Natasha, convinces Anjali to commit in writing that she will not get married until after she turns 25. Anjali agrees to this. Now her three friends get together and resolve to find men who will attempt to marry her before she turns 25. Accordingly, four men attempt to woo Anjali and try to win her heart. Anjali is subsequently willing to marry these men; however, prior to his agreement, she discovers the bet and subsequently refuses to marry any of the men.

== Cast ==
- Rekha
- Mahima Chaudhry
- Vasundhara Das
- Kim Sharma
- Ashmit Patel

== Soundtrack ==
#	Title	Singer(s)
1	"Abhi Abhi"	Udit Narayan, Ayesha Darbar
2	"Din Dhal Jaaye"	Rekha
3	"Jaanam"	Shaan, Sadhna Sargam
4	"Kamrein Mein Aaja"	Shaan, Suzanne
5	"Kudiyon Ka Hai Zamaan"	Sunidhi Chauhan, Jaspinder Narula

== Reception ==
Kudiyon Ka Hai Zamana received largely negative reviews from critics upon release.

The Times of India strongly criticised the film's execution, noting that the attempt to focus on female-centric themes falls flat and suggested that even veteran actor Rekha could not salvage it, implying that it failed to rise above conventional, hero-oriented cinema, effectively rating it 0 out of 5 stars.

Bollywood Hungama was similarly dismissive, awarding the film 1 out of 5 stars and criticising its inept writing, lack of engagement, and squandered potential despite an interesting premise. The review noted that the film's writing outweighed its few entertaining moments, calling it a "poor show" and a non-starter at the box office.
