= Yeh Hai Jalwa =

2002 Indian film by David Dhawan

- Poster
- Directed by: David Dhawan
- Written by: Rumi Jaffery
- Produced by: Kanchan Ketan Desai; Ketan Desai
- Starring: Salman Khan; Rishi Kapoor; Ameesha Patel
- Cinematography: Ashok Mehta
- Edited by: David Dhawan
- Music by: Songs: Himesh Reshammiya; Anand Raj Anand; Score: Aadesh Shrivastava
- Production company: MKD Films Combine
- Distributed by: Sohail Khan Productions
- Release date: 26 July 2002
- Running time: 142 minutes
- Country: India
- Language: Hindi
- Budget: ₹ 8 crore
- Box office: ₹ 10.88 crore

Yeh Hai Jalwa (transl. This Is Magic) is a 2002 Indian Hindi-language romantic comedy film directed by David Dhawan. It stars an ensemble cast, including Salman Khan, Rishi Kapoor, Ameesha Patel, Sanjay Dutt and Shammi Kapoor, with Kader Khan, Rati Agnihotri, Anupam Kher, Kiran Kumar, Rinke Khanna and Sharad Kapoor in supporting roles. It is inspired by the American film Carbon Copy. Ameesha Patel later claimed the film was a failure at the box office due to the hit-and-run case that Salman Khan was involved in around the time of its release.

== Plot ==
An orphan named Raj Saxena/Mittal, also known as Raju, works as a businessman in India. His mother died when he was very young, and his father had already left the family. One day, Raju sees Rajesh Mittal receiving an award on television and realises that Rajesh is his father. He immediately travels to London. At the airport, he meets Sonia Singh, who tries to trick him into carrying her luggage. Raju sees through her scheme, which backfires on Sonia, and the two soon fall in love.

Raju finds Rajesh and tells him the truth. He then discovers that Rajesh is already married to Smitha and has two children, Rinkie and Bunty. Rinkie is engaged to Vicky, unaware that he is involved in drug dealing. Raju gives Rajesh seven days to tell his family the truth and acknowledge him as his son, or he will do it himself. Fearing exposure, Rajesh hires gangsters to attack Raju, but Raju is beaten and later rescued by Shera, another Indian living in London. Shera advises Raju to enter Rajesh’s house as a family friend and win over the household.

When Raju asks for accommodation, Rajesh arranges for him to stay at his friend Robin Singh’s mansion, where Raju meets Sonia again and learns that she is Robin’s daughter. They gradually fall in love. On the seventh day, Raju goes to Rajesh’s bungalow, only to discover that the family is on holiday. He returns to India, but then overhears Robin inviting Rajesh to his house. Raju hides in the boot of Robin’s car and travels with them. Rajesh is horrified to see him, but Raju remains with the family at the resort.

Rajesh later discovers that Raju’s visa has expired and reports him to the police. Raju is taken away, but Purshottam Mittal, who has just returned from Paris, meets him at the airport. Raju tells him that he knows Rajesh, and Purshottam renews his visa and brings him back to the Mittal mansion.

Back home, Rajesh assumes he will finally be rid of Raju, but Raju appears at the mansion once more. Rajesh tries again to have him attacked, with Robin’s help, but Raju learns of the plan and swaps his photograph with Rajesh’s. The goon attacks Rajesh during a morning jog, but Raju saves him, with Purshottam arriving in time to help. Some days later, Rajesh attends a conference overseas and Raju accompanies him. There, Raju boldly confronts the company accusing Rajesh of poor sales, and explains that the company’s products are of poor quality. The company is impressed and offers Raju a job, but he refuses, saying he cannot leave Rajesh. A pleased Rajesh gets drunk and calls Raju his son.

The next morning, Raju buys breakfast for Rajesh and then tries to reconcile with Sonia, only to find her deliberately flirting with another man to make him jealous. He soon realises that the man is Shera, who explains that he and Sonia are only pretending and that he is willing to help Raju further. Shera also tells Raju where Vicky usually conducts his drug deals.

Raju catches Vicky in the act and reveals the truth to Rajesh and Rinkie, leaving Rinkie devastated. Rajesh strikes Vicky, and Vicky shoots him. Rajesh is rushed to hospital, where both of his kidneys are found to have failed. Purshottam offers to donate a kidney, but he is diabetic and cannot do so. Smitha also volunteers, but her blood group does not match Rajesh’s. Bunty refuses because he wants to become a pop singer, and Rinkie refuses because she wants to have children one day. The next morning, the doctor tells Purshottam that a kidney donor has already been found, though the donor wishes to remain anonymous.

In the end, Rajesh admits to the family that Raju is his son. Raju denies it at first, then later confesses, and it is revealed that he donated the kidney to save Rajesh. Purshottam and Smitha are delighted rather than angry, and the family is reunited.

== Cast ==
- Rishi Kapoor as Rajesh Mittal
- Salman Khan as Raj "Raju" Saxena / Raj Mittal
- Ameesha Patel as Sonia Singh
- Poonam Dhillon as Meghna Saxena Mittal (photograph)
- Rati Agnihotri as Smita Mittal
- Rinke Khanna as Rinkie Mittal
- Shammi Kapoor as Boss
- Anupam Kher as Robin Singh
- Kader Khan as Purshottam Mittal
- Sharad Kapoor as Vikram aka Vicky
- Ajay Nagrath as Bunty Mittal
- Anil Nagrath as Dr. Khanna
- Shahbaz Khan as Chotu
- Kiran Kumar as Chotu's elder brother
- Navin Nischol as Surgeon
- Jaspal Bhatti as Buta Singh
- Gavin Packard as Goon
- Sanjay Dutt as Shera (special appearance)

== Soundtrack ==
Yeh Hai Jalwa

Soundtrack album by Himesh Reshammiya
- Released: 6 February 2002
- Genre: Feature film soundtrack
- Label: Universal Music India
- Producer: Himesh Reshammiya

Himesh Reshammiya chronology
Humraaz (2002)	Yeh Hai Jalwa (2002)	Chalo Ishq Ladaaye (2002)

The album features seven songs composed by Himesh Reshammiya and the lyrics penned by Sudhakar Sharma, apart from the song "London Mein India" which was composed by Anand Raj Anand and the lyrics were penned by Dev Kohli.

=== Track lists ===
No.	Title	Singer(s)	Length
1.	"Jalwa"	Kumar Sanu, Alka Yagnik
2.	"Dhire Dhire"	Udit Narayan, Alka Yagnik, Zubeen Garg
3.	"Carbon Copy (Part 1)"	Shaan, Zubeen Garg
4.	"Aankhen Pyari Hain"	Kumar Sanu, Alka Yagnik, Zubeen Garg
5.	"Chudi Khankayi Re"	Udit Narayan, Alka Yagnik, Shaan
6.	"Carbon Copy (Part 2); Part 3 - Sad version"	Part 2: Shaan, Kumar Sanu, Zubeen Garg Part 3: Kumar Sanu
7.	"London Mein India"	Sukhwinder Singh, Pankaj Udhas

== Critical response ==
Taran Adarsh of Bollywood Hungama gave the film 1.5 stars out of 5, writing, ″On the whole, YEH HAI JALWA is an ordinary entertainer with nothing much to rave about.″ Chitra Mahesh of The Hindu wrote, "Usually these days, even if the film lacks credibility it is made up by good cinematography, special effects or sometimes even the music – in this case, however, none of these elements help in salvaging either the story or the proceedings. At best it's a film you can watch if you are terribly jobless!." Priya Ganapati of Rediff.com wrote, "While there was some method in the madness of Dhawan's earlier flicks, Aankhen, Saajan Chale Sasural and Coolie No 1, Dhawan's recent films have been insipid. His last two releases – Kyunkii Main Jhooth Nahi Bolta and Hum Kisise Se Kum Nahin -- slipped out of the theatres in a jiffy. Yeh Hai Jalwa will only complete the trilogy of disasters for Dhawan."
