= Rahul Bhatt =

Indian fitness trainer and actor (born 1982)

- Born: 24 January 1982 (age 44); Mumbai, Maharashtra, India
- Occupation: Fitness trainer
- Parent(s): Mahesh Bhatt; Kiran Bhatt
- Relatives: Bhatt family

Rahul Bhatt (born 24 January 1982) is an Indian fitness trainer and actor. The son of film director Mahesh Bhatt and Kiran Bhatt, Rahul gained notoriety in 2009 following the revelations that David Headley, an accused in the 2008 Mumbai attacks, had befriended him and they were close friends. In an investigative report by PBS, Bhatt was described as a B-movie actor, asking for favours to reveal more details about Headley. In 2010, he was a contestant in the reality show Bigg Boss 4.

== Biography ==
Rahul is the second child of Mahesh Bhatt and Kiran Bhatt (born Loraine Bright). On his father's side, Bhatt is of predominantly Gujarati descent and on his mother's side, he is of English, Scottish, Armenian, and Burmese ancestry. He is the younger brother of actress and filmmaker Pooja Bhatt and his younger half-sister Alia Bhatt is a Bollywood filmstar. In September 2010, Rahul became a part of the Indian reality show Bigg Boss 4, hosted by Salman Khan.

== Association with David Headley ==
In September 2008, Rahul Bhatt and friend Vilas Varak met David Headley at a Mumbai gym. Even after the 26/11 attacks, they were continuously in touch, with Headley writing to Rahul an email in which he said he would soon be visiting them again. According to Headley's testimony, he was fond of Bhatt. He claimed to have warned Bhatt not to visit South Mumbai area on 26 November, the day the Mumbai attacks started.

== Television ==
Year	Name	Role	Channel
2010	Bigg Boss 4	Contestant	Colors TV
