= Nazar (2005 film) =

- Poster
- Directed by: Soni Razdan
- Written by: Mahesh Bhatt
- Produced by: Mukesh Bhatt
- Starring: Meera; Ashmit Patel; Rupak Mann; Alyy Khan
- Cinematography: Anshuman Mahaley
- Edited by: Amitabh Shukla
- Music by: Anu Malik; Roop Kumar Rathod
- Production company: Vishesh Films
- Release date: 20 May 2005
- Running time: 137 minutes
- Countries: India; Pakistan
- Language: Hindi

Nazar is a 2005 Hindi-language supernatural thriller film directed by Soni Razdan, starring Meera and Ashmit Patel. An Indo-Pak co-production, the film marks the debut of Pakistani actress Meera in Hindi films. It is inspired by the 1991 film 100 Days, which itself took inspiration from the 1978 American film Eyes of Laura Mars.

Released on 20 May 2005 alongside Naina, another film based on the theme of extra-sensory perception, Nazar was a box-office bomb.

== Plot ==
Nazar revolves around a young and talented pop star Divya (Meera). From the start it is obvious the existence of a strange aura surrounding Divya's personality. She is a girl who has lived a secluded life after the death of her parents in a car crash. After shooting her last video she decides she wants to go home. Along the way, despite the darkness she discovers a dead body on the middle of the road.

From this moment on Divya has visions of the future, rather than an art it becomes like a curse for Divya as all she sees is brutal murders. In her visions all she sees is dance-bargirls being stabbed, strangled and suffocated to death by a killer whose face continues to elude Divya's clairvoyance.

Unknowing to her, a policeman, Rohan (Ashmit Patel), is investigating murders of bargirls in the city. A serial killer is on the loose and Rohan has the case to nab him.

Rohan buys Divya's story (about her visions of murders) but his female assistant Sujata (Koel Purie) does not. Taking help of Divya's clairvoyance, he begins to zero down on prime suspects that include a doctor, a fugitive and an eccentric-alcoholic uncle who frequents bars regularly.

As the movie progresses, Divya becomes the next on the murders list of the unknown killer who might have been the same who killed the person on the road that she found that night.

In the end, it turns out that Sujata is the serial killer: her husband slept with a bargirl who passes AIDS to him, who in turn gave the disease to Sujata. From then on, she developed a dislike for the bar girls in the city and goes on a killing spree. She dies at the end by falling off a building.

== Cast ==
- Meera as Divya Varma (dubbed by Malavika Shivpuri)
- Ashmit Patel as Inspector Rohan Sethi
- Koel Purie as Sub-Inspector Sujata Deshmukh
- Rupak Mann
- Alyy Khan as Dr. Tarun Khanna
- Neena Gupta
- Sarita Joshi

== Soundtrack ==
Nazar

Soundtrack album by Anu Malik Roop Kumar Rathod
- Released: 23 April 2005
- Genre: Feature film soundtrack
- Label: T-Series

The Soundtrack was composed by Anu Malik & Roop Kumar Rathod

| No. | Title | Lyrics | Music | Singer(s) | Length |
|---|---|---|---|---|---|
| 1. | "Nazar Nazar" | Sayeed Quadri | Anu Malik | KK | 6:54 |
| 2. | "Mohabbat Zindagi Hai" | Sayeed Quadri | Anu Malik | Shreya Ghoshal | 5:41 |
| 3. | "Pyar Asth" | Sayeed Quadri | Anu Malik | Sunidhi Chauhan | 6:41 |
| 4. | "Ali Ali" | Shakeel Azmi | Roop Kumar Rathod | Shubha Mudgal | 6:48 |
| 5. | "Shor Machale" | Sayeed Quadri | Anu Malik | Sunidhi Chauhan | 4:48 |
| 6. | "Nazar Nazar" (Remix) | Sayeed Quadri | Anu Malik | KK | 7:16 |
| 7. | "Pyar Asth" (Instrumental) | | | | 6:40 |
| 8. | "Mohabbat Zindagi Hai" (Instrumental) | | | | 5:37 |

== Reception ==
Taran Adarsh from Bollywood Hungama gave the film 1.5 stars out of 5, noting the film's similarities with Eyes of Laura Mars and The Eye, and remarking that while it had a few scary moments to bank upon, the weak screenplay was its biggest undoing. Raja Sen from Rediff.com praised Meera's performance, while feeling the film's plot itself was "an amalgamation of a half-dozen unnecessary to identify DVDs."

== Controversy ==
The film was controversial in Pakistan for depicting a kissing scene between Meera and Ashmit Patel, which was deemed as being against Islamic ethnic and moral values in the country. Meera was fined by the Pakistani government, while Patel was not able to attend the film's premiere in Pakistan as his visa application was rejected.
