= Mystery of the Tattoo =

- Release poster
- Directed by: Kalaiarasi Sathappan; Ganesh Mahadevan
- Written by: Kalaiarasi Sathappan
- Produced by: Gajinaath Jeyakumar; Kashish Khan; Anushree Shah
- Starring: Arjun Rampal; Rohit Raaj; Daisy Shah; Manoj Joshi; Ameesha Patel
- Music by: Magizhan Santhors
- Production companies: Kashish Khan Production, Tattoo Film Production
- Distributed by: Pickle entertainment
- Release date: 1 September 2023
- Country: India
- Language: Hindi

Mystery of the Tattoo is a 2023 Indian Hindi-language psychological thriller film directed by Kalaiarasi Sathappan and Ganesh Mahadevan. Produced by Gajinaath Jeyakumar, Kashish Khan, and Anushree Shah. The film stars Arjun Rampal, Rohit Raaj, Daisy Shah, Manoj Joshi, Ameesha Patel, Myra Sareen, Tom Hendryk, Arun Kapur, Saira Pandhal, Jamie Lambe, and Suki Chottmore. The film was released on 1 September 2023 to negative reviews from critics.

== Cast ==
- Rohit Raaj as Vikarn Abhimanyu
- Daisy Shah as Aathmika
- Rohit Belani (actor) as Yusuf Khan
- Manoj Joshi
- Myra Sareen
- Tom Hendry as Officer Orth
- Arun Kapur as Student Arun
- Saira Pandhal
- Jamie Lambe
- Suki Chott
- Andriana Mourelle
- Arjun Rampal as Karan Abhimanyu (cameo appearance)
- Ameesha Patel as Chitra Devi (cameo appearance)

== Production ==
Rohit Raaj made his debut lead role through the film. The film was Filmed in London during Pandemic.Ameesha Patel and Arjun Rampal made a cameo role in this film.

== Reception ==
Archika Khurana of The Times of India rated two out of five and stated that "The character’s arcs are too cliched."Amar Ujala critic one point five out of five stars and gave mixed reviews.
