= Abbas Kazmi =

Indian lawyer (born 1955)

- Born: 18 May 1955 (age 71)
- Occupation: Lawyer
- Years active: 1993–present
- Children: 3
- Website: abbaskazmi.com

Abbas Kazmi (born 18 May 1955) is a criminal lawyer who received wide media coverage for representing Ajmal Kasab, the prime accused in the 26/11 Mumbai terror attacks. In 2010, he was a contestant in the reality show Bigg Boss 4.

== Biography ==
Kazmi first came to Mumbai as an aspiring actor and worked in a few films such as Anjaan Rahen, with Feroz Khan and Asha Parekh, and Jugnoo, with Dharmendra and Hema Malini. He found little success in acting and so decided to go into law practice.

After graduating in 1980 from K.C. College, Mumbai, Kazmi moved to Jeddah, Saudi Arabia. There he worked as a financial advisor. He moved back to Mumbai in 1993 and soon represented several suspects in the 1993 Mumbai bomb blast case. Other clients of his include Samajwadi Party leader Abu Asim Azmi and suspects in the case of Gulshan Kumar's murder.

Kazmi was married in 1985. He has two daughters and one son. The name of his children are Anna, Samah and Ali.

== 2008 Mumbai attack case ==
In April 2009, Kazmi was appointed as the defence lawyer in the trial of the main accused in the Mumbai attack, Kasab. The previously appointed lawyer, Anjali Waghmare, was removed from the case due to conflict of interest: she was also representing a victim in the same case. Kasab had asked for Pakistani lawyers to represent him at his trial, but a lack of response from Pakistani officials and the resulting delay resulted in Kazmi's appointment. In various interviews, Kazmi made his position clear by saying that he will defend his client to perform his professional duty sincerely.

During the case proceedings, Kazmi tried explaining to Kasab the seriousness of the case against him. Kazmi stated: "I tried explaining it to him including the extent of the punishment he faces but he failed to see the gravity of the situation". Kazmi was provided police security during the trial. On 6 May 2010, Kasab was sentenced to death by the court; on 21 February 2011, Bombay High Court upheld the sentence given by the trial court.

Kasab appealed the Bombay High Court's decision in the Supreme Court of India in October 2011. He claimed at this point that he had been "brainwashed like a robot [to commit the act] in the name of Allah". Kazmi, however, had dismissed this theory during the trial. According to a leaked American diplomatic cable, during Kasab's trial a US diplomat had asked Kazmi to build a case based on a brainwashing plea. The unnamed diplomat suggested to the attorney that he call Kasab's parents in Pakistan as witnesses to the assertion. Kazmi declined the request on the basis that there was no money for travel arrangements for Kasab's parents. He also said, "I am an Indian citizen. I am not going to contact anyone in Pakistan."

== Bigg Boss ==
Kazmi appeared in the reality show Bigg Boss 4. He got eliminated in the 1st week.

== Television ==
| Year | Name | Role | Channel |
|---|---|---|---|
| 2010 | Bigg Boss 4 | Contestant | Colors TV |

== See also ==
- 2008 Mumbai attacks
