= Humraaz =

2002 Indian film by Abbas–Mustan

- Theatrical release poster
- Directed by: Abbas–Mustan
- Written by: Shiraz Ahmed; Shyam Goel
- Produced by: Ganesh Jain; Ratan Jain; Champak Jain
- Starring: Bobby Deol; Akshaye Khanna; Ameesha Patel
- Cinematography: Ravi Yadav
- Edited by: Hussain A. Burmawala
- Music by: Songs: Himesh Reshammiya; Background Score: Aadesh Shrivastava
- Distributed by: Venus Movies
- Release date: 5 July 2002
- Running time: 174 minutes
- Country: India
- Language: Hindi
- Budget: ₹15 crore Note: figure contains print and advertising costs
- Box office: ₹29 crore

Humraaz (transl. Confidant) is a 2002 Indian Hindi-language thriller film directed by the duo Abbas–Mustan. It stars Bobby Deol, Akshaye Khanna, and Ameesha Patel. This film marks the third collaboration between Deol and Abbas–Mustan. The film is inspired from the 1998 American film A Perfect Murder (which was a remake of Alfred Hitchcock's 1954 film Dial M for Murder, itself an adaptation of Frederick Knott's 1952 play of the same name). It was remade in Tamil as Girivalam.

== Plot ==
While leading a dance troupe, Karan and Priya are in love and participate in a dance audition where the winner gets the chance to perform on the luxurious Singhania cruise ship owned by Raj Singhania. Jojo Fernandes, leader of another troupe, wins by cheating in the competition. Karan beats up Jojo and accidentally kills him, and his troupe is selected to perform eventually. Raj meets Priya, falls in love with her, and proposes to her. She says yes. It is revealed that Priya and Karan were scheming to get Raj's wealth.

Meanwhile, another dancer named Harry from the troupe gets wind of their plot and starts to blackmail Karan. It is revealed that Karan killed Jojo Fernandes deliberately, rather than the latter dying in an accident. Karan meets him at the designated place to hand him over the money but instead kills him. Unknown to Karan, just before dying, he calls Raj to reveal the truth. The call goes in the voice mailbox since Raj is not in his office.

Priya meets with an accident while returning home. Raj showers Priya with all his love and care. Priya is overwhelmed to know Raj has kept a fast for two days. Priya tells Karan that she will not go ahead with the divorce. Karan feels betrayed and decides to get his revenge on Priya and Raj. He feigns a call from Harry and acts as if he is being harassed for a bribe. Priya decides to give her jewelry to Karan to save him. However, Karan anonymously calls Raj from a public phone and lies to him that Priya loves Karan and she is giving away the money that she looted from Raj to Karan. Raj follows her and sees that Priya is meeting Karan and handing over her jewelry. He also finds the recording of Harry later in his office.

Raj blackmails Karan by showing him the tape to kill Priya. Raj explains every point of the plan right up to precise time and says that he will call on the landline as he wants to hear Priya scream while she is dying. Priya, unaware of the plan, decides to confess everything to Raj in an audio recording and replace the tape with the music cassette in Raj's car. She knows that Raj has a habit of listening to music while traveling to the office. In the recordings, she mentions that if Raj has forgiven her, he should give her a call. If not, she will leave him forever.

Raj was discussing a meeting with an employee that day and hence doesn't listen to the tape. Karan enters the house as planned and waits for the call. At the same time, Priya is also waiting for the call from Raj, expecting him to forgive her. Raj calls the landline as planned, and an excited Priya answers the phone. Karan attacks her at the same time and ensures Raj can hear her screams. Raj soon listens to the tape as he sits in the car in horror. He rushes to save Priya only to see the police and an ambulance waiting at the house.

It is revealed that Priya is saved and her attacker dead. Her savior is none other than Karan; the person who really attacked Priya is another man. Karan then tells Raj that by using Harry's cassette, he can prove nothing. He blackmails Raj, saying he had recorded the meeting with him about the murder, and demands that Raj divorce Priya with large alimony as a part of his ransom plan.

Raj goes to meet Karan at a decided spot where he says he is ready to go to prison, but only after Karan is killed. The two men fight. The two men fight as Karan prepares to kill Raj until Priya catches up and steps in, exposing her realization of Karan's murderous nature. Karan subsequently shoots Priya, and Raj runs to kill Karan. Karan tries to kill Raj, but it turns out Priya is still alive and shoots Karan and saving Raj, and Karan dies. Raj and Priya are finally reunited.

== Cast ==
- Bobby Deol as Raj Singhania
- Akshaye Khanna as Karan Malhotra
- Ameesha Patel as Priya
- Johnny Lever as Darshan Bhatt
- Suhasini Mulay as Raj's grandmother
- Jeetu Verma as Jojo Fernandes
- Farhan Khan as Harry
- Dinesh Hingoo as Rustom Uncle
- Dilip Joshi as Gauri Shankar
- Sheela Sharma as Rosy
- Sudhir as Tommy
- Bhairavi Vaidya as Raj's aunt
- Firoz Irani as Raj's uncle
- Roshan Tirandaz as Shireen
- Shabanam Kapoor as Mrs. Braganza

== Production ==
Before production began, Priyanka Chopra was initially signed to play the female lead and was expected to make her film debut with Humraaz. She reportedly shot for two days but was unable to continue due to a dispute, after which the role went to Amisha Patel.

Arjun Rampal and Abhishek Bachchan were initially considered to portray the negative lead in the film. However, things could not materialize, and the role was eventually played by Akshaye Khanna.

== Soundtrack ==
Humraaz

Soundtrack album by Himesh Reshammiya
- Released: 6 May 2002 (India)
- Genre: Feature film soundtrack
- Length: 48:53
- Label: Venus Records & Tapes

Himesh Reshammiya chronology
Kyaa Dil Ne Kahaa (2002)	Humraaz (2002)	Yeh Hai Jalwa (2002)

The soundtrack of Humraaz was composed by Himesh Reshammiya, with lyrics by Sudhakar Sharma. According to Box Office India, the album sold approximately 2.2 million units.

The song "Bardaasht Nahi Kar Sakta" was reused as "Nee Yaaro Nee Yaaro" in the Tamil remake Girivalam (2005).

No.	Title	Singers	Length
1.	"Dil Ne Kar Liya"	Udit Narayan, Alka Yagnik	05:19
2.	"Tune Zindagi Mein – Male"	Udit Narayan	05:11
3.	"Pyaar Kar"	Udit Narayan, Shaan, Kavita Krishnamurthy	06:40
4.	"Bardaasht Nahi Kar Sakta"	K.K., Sunidhi Chauhan	05:36
5.	"Sanam Mere Humraaz"	Kumar Sanu, Alka Yagnik	05:30
6.	"Life Ban Jayegi"	Sonu Nigam, Jaspinder Narula	05:57
7.	"Tune Zindagi Mein"	Alka Yagnik	05:12
8.	"Bardaasht Nahi Kar Sakta – Remix"	Sonu Nigam, Sunidhi Chauhan	04:53
9.	"Tune Zindagi Mein – Sad"	Alka Yagnik	01:48
10.	"Theme Music (Instrumental)"		02:33

== Reception ==
=== Critical response ===
Derek Elley of Variety described Humraaz as "a well-played Bollywood mystery-thriller that’s let down only by a lack of visual style," adding that it "gets good character mileage from its star trio and fine performances from two of them (Bobby Deol, Ameesha Patel)." Taran Adarsh of Bollywood Hungama gave the film 3 out of 5 stars, noting, "On the whole, Humraaz has a fresh cast, a riveting script, a grandiose look, and several thrilling moments to take you on a joyride for the next three hours. The film has all it takes to appeal to an avid cinegoer who's thirsting for wholesome entertainment. Recommended!"

Vivek Fernandes of Rediff.com remarked that "The directors do take their time establishing the scheme of things, spoonfeeding the audience at times. Also, the experience would have been more riveting had the film been a little shorter. But such minor flaws, we shall let pass. Humraaz, definitely, merits a dekho." A reviewer for Sify commented, "Except that having watched a lot of Hitchcockian plots, one feels let down at the way our filmmakers end a good plot." Chitra Mahesh of The Hindu observed, "Though the end is filmy and long drawn out, the suspense is tangible."

== Accolades ==
Award	Date of the ceremony	Category	Recipients	Result	Ref.
Zee Cine Awards	11 January 2003	Best Performance in a Negative Role	Akshaye Khanna	Nominated	
Screen Awards	19 January 2003	Best Director	Abbas–Mustan	Nominated	
Screen Awards	19 January 2003	Best Actor in a Negative Role	Akshaye Khanna	Nominated	
Screen Awards	19 January 2003	Best Editing	Hussain A. Burmawala	Nominated	
Screen Awards	19 January 2003	Best Art Direction	R. Varman	Nominated	
Filmfare Awards	21 February 2003	Best Film	Humraaz	Nominated	
Filmfare Awards	21 February 2003	Best Director	Abbas–Mustan	Nominated	
Filmfare Awards	21 February 2003	Best Actor	Bobby Deol	Nominated	
Filmfare Awards	21 February 2003	Best Actress	Ameesha Patel	Nominated	
Filmfare Awards	21 February 2003	Best Performance in a Negative Role	Akshaye Khanna	Nominated	
Filmfare Awards	21 February 2003	Best Performance in a Comic Role	Johnny Lever	Nominated	
Filmfare Awards	21 February 2003	Best Music Director	Himesh Reshammiya	Nominated	
Filmfare Awards	21 February 2003	Best Lyricist	Sudhakar Sharma for "Sanam Mere Humraaz"	Nominated	
Filmfare Awards	21 February 2003	Best Lyricist	Sudhakar Sharma for "Tune Zindagi Mein Aake"	Nominated	
Filmfare Awards	21 February 2003	Best Male Playback Singer	KK for "Bardaasht Nahi Kar Sakta"	Nominated	
Filmfare Awards	21 February 2003	Best Male Playback Singer	Kumar Sanu for "Sanam Mere Humraaz"	Nominated	
Filmfare Awards	21 February 2003	Best Female Playback Singer	Alka Yagnik for "Sanam Mere Humraaz"	Nominated	
Sansui Viewer's Choice Awards	27 March 2003	Best Director	Abbas–Mustan	Nominated	
Sansui Viewer's Choice Awards	27 March 2003	Best Actress	Ameesha Patel	Nominated	
Sansui Viewer's Choice Awards	27 March 2003	Best Performance in a Negative Role	Akshaye Khanna	Won	
Bollywood Movie Awards	3 May 2003	Best Film	Humraaz	Nominated	
Bollywood Movie Awards	3 May 2003	Best Actor in a Negative Role	Akshaye Khanna	Nominated	
Bollywood Movie Awards	3 May 2003	Best Actor in a Comic Role	Johnny Lever	Nominated	
Bollywood Movie Awards	3 May 2003	Best Costume Design	Rocky S	Nominated	
Bollywood Movie Awards	3 May 2003	Best Editing	Hussain A. Burmawala	Nominated	
IIFA Awards	17 May 2003	Best Actress	Ameesha Patel	Nominated	
IIFA Awards	17 May 2003	Best Performance in a Negative Role	Akshaye Khanna	Won	

== See also ==
- Remakes of films by Alfred Hitchcock
