= Froebel's International School =

- فروبیلز انٹرنیشنل اسکول

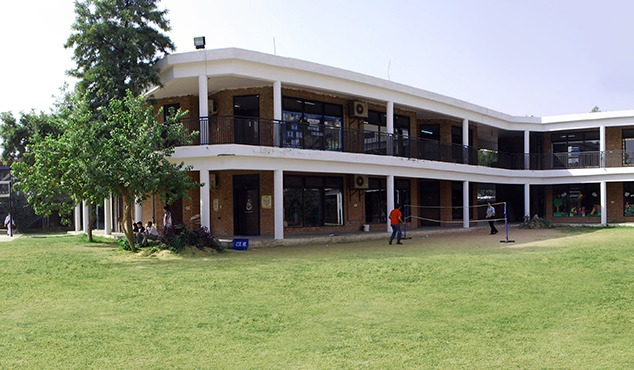
- Froebel's International School (Peshawar Road Branch)

Location
- Islamabad, Rawalpindi, Lahore, Wah Cantt, Karachi; Pakistan; 33.722902276342175°N 73.05292213097361°E

Information
- Type: Private
- Established: 1975; 51 years ago
- Founder: Sabiha Zamir Khan
- Campus type: Urban
- Colors: Blue and white
- Website: www.froebels.edu.pk

Froebel's International School is a network of private schools in Pakistan with branches in some major cities of the country. It is considered one of the best schools in Pakistan

== History ==
It was founded in 1975 by Sabiha Zamir Khan, the widow of Admiral Zamir. In 1981, Froebel's acquired a 6,000 square yard plot at Rs70 per square yard in Sector F-7/2 of Islamabad to develop a new school branch. The school was constructed in 1987.

In September 2013, a student from Froebel's International School Islamabad broke the world record by scoring 47 A's in his O and A level examinations.

Froebel's Model United Nations (FROMUN) is held on annual basis at Froebel's F-7 Branch. In 2024 Froebel's International Peshawar Road Branch hosted Froebel's Debating Championship (FDC) , Froebel's very own Palimentary Championship.

== Branches ==
- Froebel's International School F-7 Branch
- Froebel's International School Peshawar Road Branch
- Froebel's International School Wah Cantt Branch
- Froebel's International School Soan Branch
- Froebel's International School Gulberg Greens Branch
- Froebel's International School F-11 Branch
- Froebel's International School Lake City Lahore Branch
- Froebel's International School Ring Road Lahore Branch
- Froebel's International Daycare
- Froebel's International School DHA Phase 8 Karachi
- Froebel's International College DHA Phase 2 Islamabad

== Notable alumni ==
- Bilawal Bhutto Zardari
- Haroon Tariq
- Mudassar Hussain
- Amira Jadoon
