= Ankahee (2006 film) =

- Theatrical release poster
- Directed by: Vikram Bhatt
- Screenplay by: Yash-Vinay
- Dialogues by: Girish Dhamija
- Story by: Vikram Bhatt
- Produced by: Pritish Nandy; Rangita Pritish Nandy
- Starring: Aftab Shivdasani; Ameesha Patel; Esha Deol
- Cinematography: Pravin Bhatt
- Edited by: Diwakar Bhonsle; Virendra Gharse
- Music by: Pritam
- Distributed by: Pritish Nandy Communications
- Release date: 19 May 2006
- Running time: 151 minutes
- Country: India
- Language: Hindi

Ankahee (transl. Unsaid) is a 2006 Indian Hindi-language romantic thriller film directed by Vikram Bhatt starring Aftab Shivdasani, Ameesha Patel and Esha. The film was originally titled Aakhir. It is based upon the life of former Miss Universe Sushmita Sen, who was publicly in a relationship with Indian film director Vikram Bhatt.

== Plot ==
Sheena arrives home when her mother, Nandita, tells her that her father, Shekhar, has sent her a letter and wants to meet her as he's dying from illness. Sheena refuses to meet her father, as he abandoned her and her mother for sixteen years when Sheena was just six years of age. As her mother persuades, she finally agrees and sees him in a bad situation under careful nursing. Unable to express his feelings, Shekhar lends his daughter a diary in which he writes about all the incidents that led to his break-off. Henceforth, the story of Dr. Shekhar unspools.

Sixteen years back, Shekhar and Nandita, with their daughter, had a perfect life; no one could suspect that his complacent heart was laying the seed of betrayal. Shekhar meets an actress and a former beauty queen, Kavya Krishna, at a hospital with her wrist being slit, and slowly the two fall for each other. Shekhar's friend, Dr. Kunal Mehta, a psychiatrist (Amin Hajee), confronts him to stay away from her as he feels that their constant interaction will ruin his marriage.

Shekhar goes to Goa for a press conference, followed by Kavya, who tells him she had no choice but this to break her loneliness. Something brews between the two as Shekhar goes back to his home in Mumbai. Soon, Nandita notices that Shekhar is uncomfortable with the surroundings, and as she tries to help him, he starts yelling at her about why she is giving him much importance. More issues pop up as Shekhar misses his daughter's annual school function and decides to confront Kavya to end this relationship. But Kavya leaves no stone unturned; she visits him and explains how she can feel happy only with him. Shekhar gives in.

Nandita tells Shekhar that a journalist from Mid-Day newspaper had called and wanted to speak to him. Ignoring this call, the next day, he discovers that his relationship with Kavya is printed in the newspaper and has become the talk of the town. Kunal's wife, Shilpa, then spots Nandita at a restaurant and shows her the newspaper, leaving her in complete shock. He and Nandita confront each other about the affair, and it ends with Nandita slapping him on the face. The next day, she apologizes to him and tells him she will do anything to save this marriage. She later visits Kavya's house to confront her and asks her to let her family live in peace. As Shekhar is informed about Nandita's visit to Kavya, he loses his temper and decides to leave the house, telling Nandita how he regrets his marriage.

Sheena's parents are called to her, and the principal tells them that he's upset with the recent change in Sheena's behavior. Sheena tells her father that her classmates have been picking on her after his affair with the star; he denies it when she asks him whether it is true or not. Kavya's manager (Deepak Qazir) asks her to stop making her personal life public, as her reputation is being ruined. Kavya blames Nandita for everything and fires the manager, thinking he is working against her. She then asks Shekhar to choose between her and Nandita, as she would not mind risking her own life to keep her man exclusively for herself. Torn between the two women, Shekhar decides to split from his wife and his daughter. Nandita calls him, asking him to pay his daughter a visit as she's sick. Kavya refuses to let him go and tells him this is Nandita's plan to take him back. Shekhar gets furious and yells at her, saying she is mad, lonely, and mentally ill. Kavya is hurt, so she grabs a gun and shoots herself. Shekhar goes back to Nandita, asking her for forgiveness, but she turns him down. After reading all this, Sheena goes back to her father and hugs him as he apologizes to her. She accepts his apology, and the next day, she wakes up to find her father has died. Sheena asks her to forgive him, too, and she finally agrees.

== Cast ==
- Aftab Shivdasani as Shekhar Saxena
- Ameesha Patel as Nandita Saxena
- Esha as Kavya Krishna
- Hrishita Bhatt as Sheena Saxena (Special appearance)
  - Khushi Dubey as Young Sheena Saxena
- Amin Hajee as Dr. Kunal Mehta
- Vikas Bhalla as Kavya's ex-boyfriend
- Ashwini Kalsekar as Shilpa Mehta
- Deepak Qazir as Kavya's manager
- Vikram Bhatt (Uncredited)

== Soundtrack ==
Ankahee

Soundtrack album by Pritam
- Released: 25 March 2006
- Genre: Feature Film soundtrack
- Length: 43:00
- Label: T-Series
- Producer: Pritam

Pritam chronology
| Gangster (2006) | Ankahee (2006) | Pyaar Ke Side Effects (2006) |

The soundtrack for Ankahee has music by Pritam with lyrics from Amitabh Varma, Sameer and Subrat Sinha.

=== Track listing ===
| No. | Title | Singers | Length |
|---|---|---|---|
| 1. | "Aa Paas Aa" | Shreya Ghoshal | 6:33 |
| 2. | "Ankahee" | Kunal Ganjawala | 4:06 |
| 3. | "Ankahee – 1" | Shaan, Abrar-ul-Haq | 4:56 |
| 4. | "Ek Pal Ke Liye" | KK | 5:55 |
| 5. | "Ek Pal" | Sonu Nigam | 5:43 |
| 6. | "Ek Pal 2" | Shreya Ghoshal | 5:39 |
| 7. | "Lamha" | Babul Supriyo | 5:02 |
| 8. | "Tumse Yu Milenge" | Kunal Ganjawala | 5:08 |

== Reception ==
Taran Adarsh of IndiaFM gave the film 3 out of 5, writing, "On the whole, ANKAHEE is a sensitive tale that has been executed and performed with flourish. At the box-office, it caters to the elite crowd and ladies mainly -- those who have an appetite for true to life, mature and meaningful cinema. The film has the merits to grow with a strong word of mouth in days to come. Its business at multiplexes of metros should be the best. Recommended!" Diganta Guha of Hindustan Times gave the film 3 out of 5, praising the emotions, screenplay, and the performances. She further wrote, "With due respect to the script, the film is heavily performance-oriented, too - Aftab, Ameesha and Esha get equal footage and play their respective parts with grace."

Conversely, Sukanya Verma of Rediff.com gave the film 1.5 out of 5, writing, "Vikram Bhatt may have felt a lot of emotions, but Ankahee leaves you with just one: boredom."
