= Aap Mujhe Achche Lagne Lage =

2002 Indian film by Vikram Bhatt

- Directed by: Vikram Bhatt
- Screenplay by: Robin Bhatt
- Dialogues by: Girish Dhamija
- Story by: Sanjeev Duggal
- Produced by: Mohan Kumar; Gautam Kumar; Rohit Kumar
- Starring: Hrithik Roshan; Ameesha Patel
- Cinematography: Pravin Bhatt
- Edited by: Amit Saxena
- Music by: Rajesh Roshan
- Production company: Emkay Films
- Release date: 19 April 2002
- Country: India
- Language: Hindi
- Budget: ₹11 crore
- Box office: ₹20.2 crore

Aap Mujhe Achche Lagne Lage (transl. "I have started to like you") is a 2002 Indian Hindi-language romantic drama film directed by Vikram Bhatt, starring Hrithik Roshan and Ameesha Patel. Upon release, it was a critical and commercial failure, receiving overwhelmingly negative reviews. Despite its failure, this film is still notable for the reunion of the lead pair after their debut film Kaho Naa... Pyaar Hai (2000) and the only other time they have collaborated.

== Plot ==
Sapna is the only daughter of a wealthy underworld Don, Pratap Dholakia. She lives in terror of her father and brother Raman's tyranny, violence, and dangerous gang associations. Due to their numerous enemies, they have kept Sapna confined at home all her life with only her sister-in-law, Nisha, for company and comfort. Highly sheltered, naïve, and lonely, Sapna longs to break free.

One night, Sapna attends her childhood friend's wedding without Pratap's permission, and on the drive home, is attacked by her father's rival gang. Rohit Malhotra, a local college student, witnesses the attack and protects Sapna. They immediately fall for each other, but before they can introduce themselves, she is rescued by Pratap's men. Livid, Pratap forbids Sapna from ever leaving the house again.

The next morning, Rohit obtains Sapna's name from a newspaper article about the incident. He and his friends enter her home as a musical band, performing for the Navaratri dance celebrations. Sparks fly between Rohit and Sapna over the nine nights of Navaratri, and they start meeting secretly. Although Raman is suspicious, Rohit charms Pratap and earns his trust when Sapna explains that he was the man who had saved her. Rohit sneaks Sapna out for excursions and takes her home to meet his parents, who receive her lovingly. Nisha discovers their relationship, warning Sapna of Pratap's cruelty and what he and Raman would do to Rohit if they found out. Pratap, thinking that Sapna would be safest abroad, arranges for her to marry the son of a wealthy friend in London. He announces their engagement on the last night of Navaratri, shocking both Sapna and Rohit.

Devastated, Sapna ends her relationship with Rohit to protect him from her father and brother. Nisha then secretly visits Rohit at his college to return jewelry he had given Sapna, explaining that Sapna loves him so much that she is willing to enter a loveless marriage to keep him safe. Undeterred, on the night of Sapna's engagement party, Rohit whisks her away to his hostel, reasoning that it would be the last place Pratap would search for her. With the help of his friends, Sapna is disguised as a male student and settles in happily, tasting freedom for the first time. Pratap assumes that Sapna has been abducted by his rival, Kania Pathan, and has Raman execute a violent search for her, mercilessly attacking Pathan's men. When this proves futile, Pratap has Pathan's telephone bill checked and notices frequent calls to and from an unfamiliar phone number, soon identifying it as Rohit's.

Raman and his men arrive at Rohit's hostel but are met with hundreds of Rohit's peers carrying sticks and bats, showing solidarity with Rohit and Sapna. Pratap appears and publicly berates Raman for coming to the hostel without his permission. He earnestly displays fatherly concern, declaring his approval of Rohit and Sapna's relationship and convincing his daughter to return home to prepare for her wedding to Rohit.

Bursting with joy, Sapna arrives back home and tells Nisha of her father's acceptance. Dismayed, Nisha reveals that Pratap deceived Sapna to avoid creating a scene at the hostel and that her father's pride is more valuable to him than her happiness. Sapna pleads with Pratap, who furiously informs her that she is to fly to London that very night. Under the guise of peace, Pratap summons Rohit to his factory, revealing his true intentions. When Rohit refuses to give up on Sapna, Pratap orders to kill him. His men brutally beat Rohit and toss him in a gully, assuming he is dead. Sapna overhears Pratap speaking of Rohit's death and overdoses on pills. She leaves a suicide note in her room and, before leaving, informs Pratap that she wishes to be with her long-deceased mother. Eventually, Nisha finds Sapna's suicide note and throws it at Pratap, screaming at him for selfishly driving her daughter to suicide.

As Sapna is escorted to the airport, Rohit appears, bloodied and enraged. With renewed strength, he fights them off just as Sapna starts coughing up blood, nearly succumbing to her overdose. He takes her to a hospital, where she is stabilized. Pratap, emotional and humbled, gives the couple his blessing.

== Cast ==
- Hrithik Roshan as Rohit Malhotra
- Ameesha Patel as Sapna Dholakia
- Kiran Kumar as Pratap Dholakia, Sapna's father
- Mukesh Tiwari as Raman Dholakia, Sapna's older brother
- Nishigandha Wad as Nisha Dholakia, Raman's wife
- Alok Nath as Rohit's father
- Madhuri Sanjeev as Rohit's mother
- Shahbaz Khan as Kania Pathan, special appearance as Pratap's gang rival
- Prithvi Zutshi as Hasu Patel
- Ali Asgar as Madhu, Rohit's friend
- Hemant Pandey as Nayansukh, Rohit's roommate

== Music ==
Aap Mujhe Achche Lagne Lage

Soundtrack album by Rajesh Roshan
- Released: 9 January 2002
- Genre: Feature film soundtrack
- Label: Universal Music India

The music was by Rajesh Roshan and the lyrics by Dev Kohli and Ibrahim Ashq.

=== Track listing ===
| No. | Title | Lyrics | Singer(s) | Length |
|---|---|---|---|---|
| 1. | "Aap Mujhe Achche Lagne Lage" | Ibrahim Ashq | Abhijeet Bhattacharya, Alka Yagnik | 7:05 |
| 2. | "Hawaaon Ne Yeh Kaha" | Dev Kohli | Udit Narayan | 5.19 |
| 3. | "O Re Gori" | Dev Kohli | Udit Narayan, Pamela Chopra | 8:15 |
| 4. | "Kuchh Hum Mein Aisi Baatein" | Ibrahim Ashq | Sonu Nigam | 5:32 |
| 5. | "We Wish You A Great Life" | Dev Kohli | Jack, Alka Yagnik, K.K., Chorus | 6:43 |
| 6. | "Meri Jaan" | Dev Kohli | K.K., Alka Yagnik | 4:54 |
| 7. | "Tum To Sagar Jaise (Deleted Song)" | Ibrahim Ashq | Abhijeet Bhattacharya, Alka Yagnik | 6:03 |
| 8. | "Theme" | | | 0:59 |
| Total length: | | | | 48:24 |
