= Ameesha Patel =

Indian former actress (born 1975)

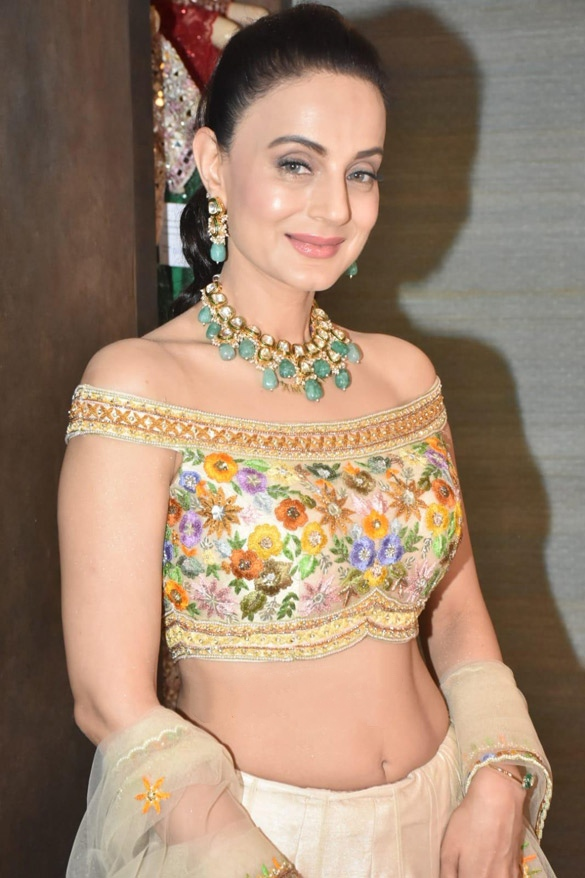
- Patel in 2023
- Born: 9 June 1975 (age 51); Mumbai, Maharashtra, India
- Other name: Amisha Patel
- Education: Tufts University
- Occupation: Actress
- Years active: 2000–present
- Relatives: Ashmit Patel (brother); Rajni Patel (grandfather)
- Awards: Full list

Ameesha Patel (pronounced [əˈmiːʂa pəˈʈeːl]; born 9 June 1975) is a former Indian actress who appeared in Hindi and Telugu films. Patel is the recipient of several awards such as a Filmfare Award and a Zee Cine Award.

Patel made her acting debut in 2000 with the romantic thriller film Kaho Naa... Pyaar Hai, a major commercial success, which earned her the Zee Cine Award for Best Female Debut. This success continued with the Telugu action film Badri (2000) and the top-grossing period film Gadar: Ek Prem Katha (2001), which won her a Filmfare Special Performance Award. After starring in Humraaz and Kya Yehi Pyaar Hai (both 2002), Patel's career declined, and she took on supporting roles in Honeymoon Travels Pvt. Ltd. (2007), Bhool Bhulaiyaa (2007) and Race 2 (2013).

After continued fluctuations, Patel made a career comeback by reprising her role in the sequel Gadar 2 (2023), which emerged as her highest grossing release. In addition to her acting career, Patel is a humanitarian and works for a number of causes.

== Early life and background ==
Patel was born to a Gujarati father, Amit Patel, and a Sindhi and Punjabi NRI mother, Asha, on 9 June 1975. She is the sister of Ashmit Patel and the granddaughter of lawyer-politician Barrister Rajni Patel, who was the Congress Pradesh Committee President of Mumbai. She was born in the Breach Candy Hospital in Mumbai and has been a trained Bharatnatyam dancer since the age of five. Her birth-name is a blend of the first three letters of her father's name Amit and the last three letters of her mother's name Asha.

Patel studied at Cathedral and John Connon School in Mumbai and was head girl for the academic year 1992–93 before heading to Tufts University in Boston in the United States to study bio-genetic engineering, which she studied for two years, before eventually switching her major to economics.

Patel's career began as an economic analyst at Khandwala Securities Limited after graduation. Later on, she received an offer from Morgan Stanley but turned it down. After returning to India, she joined Satyadev Dubey's theatre group and acted in plays, including an Urdu language play titled Neelam (1999), that was written by Tanveer Khan, upon receiving permission from her conservative parents. At the same time she plunged into modelling, appearing in several commercial campaigns. Patel has also modelled for well-known Indian brands such as Bajaj, Fair & Lovely, Cadburys, Fem, Lux and many more.

Her grandfather Rajni Patel was a lawyer and Indian national congress's politician. A street in Mumbai 'Barrisrer Rajani Patel Marge' was named after him in 1986.

== Acting career ==
=== Early widespread success (2000–2002) ===
Patel's first opportunity for acting came in the form of an offer from her father's schoolmate, Rakesh Roshan, to star opposite his son, Hrithik Roshan, in the romantic thriller Kaho Naa... Pyaar Hai (2000). The offer came immediately after she graduated from high school, but she refused the project because she wanted to continue her education in the US. Afterwards, Kareena Kapoor replaced her, but luckily, Kapoor dropped out a few days into the principal photography and Patel was given the opportunity once again during a family lunch. She readily agreed to do the project this time. The role of Sonia Saxena, an exuberant college girl in love, undergoing a tortuous time after losing her lover and rediscovering a more mature relationship, gave Patel scope to perform. The film was a major commercial success and established Patel as a rising star, earning her a nomination for the Filmfare Award for Best Female Debut. In her second film, the Telugu language drama Badri, she starred opposite Pawan Kalyan. The film was a major success, earning more than ₹12 crore distributor share in India.

2001 saw her appearing in Anil Sharma's cross-border romance Gadar: Ek Prem Katha, alongside Sunny Deol. Patel signed on much before she shot into the limelight with Kaho Naa... Pyaar Hai and was among 22 girls that were screen-tested from 500 girls who came to audition for the film. Patel had gone through a 12-hour audition before she got the part. The film went on to become the top-grossing film of the year, as well as the biggest hit of the 21st century, earning Rs 973 million in India. Set during the Indo-Pakistani War of 1947, it featured Patel as Sakeena, a Muslim girl who finds refuge in Deol's house during the riots, and subsequently falls for him. Her performance was praised, and won her the Filmfare Special Performance Award, in addition to her first nomination for the Filmfare Award for Best Actress. Taran Adarsh of IndiaFM concluded: "Despite being one-film-old, Patel deserves full marks for handling the complex role with elegance. She looks the character she is portraying and impresses with a natural performance." The film was perceived as being excessively anti-Pakistani.

These successes were followed by a series of films that flopped at the box office. In the romantic drama Yeh Zindagi Ka Safar (2001) opposite Jimmy Sheirgill, she played a successful singer who was abandoned by her mother at the time of her birth.

In 2002, Patel starred in three consecutive flops. In Aap Mujhe Achche Lagne Lage, she played the role of Sapna, who is caged in protective custody of her own father. The film marked her second collaboration with Hrithik Roshan. Unlike their successful pairing in Kaho Naa... Pyaar Hai, the film proved to be a major disappointment and emerged as a critical and commercial failure. Patel's performance in the film was highly criticised by a section of the media, but during an interview she clarified that there was an "error" because the scene explaining that her character is supposed to be asthmatic in the film was edited out not knowing that one shot would make such a difference, thus creating confusion to the viewer about her appearing out of breath, as if she's overreacting or crying. Patel's unsuccessful follow-up continued with Kranti opposite Bobby Deol and David Dhawan's comedy Yeh Hai Jalwa opposite Salman Khan. The same year, she tasted minor box office success with the romance Kya Yehi Pyaar Hai, in which she played a career-oriented young woman who rejects the advances of Aftab Shivdasani's character. She found major success when her final release of the year, the musical romantic thriller Humraaz alongside Bobby Deol and Akshaye Khanna. The Abbas–Mustan directorial saw her play a character with negative shades for the first time. She played the girlfriend of Akshaye Khanna, who marries Bobby Deol to grab his wealth – but, seeing Bobby's honesty, her character surrenders to him. Taran Adarsh commented: "Patel is just about okay as Akshaye's lover (first half), but splendid as Bobby's wife (second half). This performance should silence her detractors for sure. Also, she's looked her best with admirable outfits and perfect make-up." Humraaz emerged as the fifth highest-grossing film of the year at the box office, and her performance earned her a second nomination for the Filmfare Award for Best Actress.

=== Struggle phase (2003–2006) ===
During 2003 to 2006, Patel's acting career entered a slump. After the success of Humraaz, her string of unsuccessful films followed, and continued until 2006. In 2003, her only releases were the Tamil language film Pudhiya Geethai and the Hindi film Deepak Bahry's Parwana. Pudhiya Geethai was the first and only Tamil film that she ever starred in. Her releases in 2004, Vimal Kumar's comedy Suno Sasurjee, a delayed production since 2000, and her second Telugu language film Naani, followed. The same year, she also appeared in the music videos for "O Meri Jaan" and "Hai Kasam Tu Na Ja" by Adnan Sami.

In 2005, she starred in Satish Kaushik's thriller Vaada, playing Arjun Rampal's unfaithful wife who is followed by her obsessive ex-lover. In her next release, Elaan, she played a TV reporter. She later appeared in Ketan Mehta's historical drama Mangal Pandey: The Rising alongside Aamir Khan, where she played the role of the soft-spoken Jwala, a Bengali widow who gets rescued from committing Sati by a British commanding officer. Patel was cast as a replacement for Aishwarya Rai under the recommendation of Khan, who was impressed by her IQ level when he saw her on BBC under the segment of Question Time India in 2003. The film, which saw her in a deglamorized role for the first time, emerged as an average grosser at the box office. Her other releases that year include Zameer: The Fire Within, a delayed production since 2001, and the Telugu film Narasimhudu, both which failed at the box office.

Patel featured in six films in 2006, all of which failed commercially. She first appeared alongside Akshay Kumar and Karisma Kapoor in Suneel Darshan's musical romance Mere Jeevan Saathi, a delayed production since 2003. Her second release, Humko Tumse Pyaar Hai, saw her playing a blind village girl who gets stuck in a love triangle after undergoing eye surgery. The production was halted since 2002 due to the passing of its director-producer, until Patel's boyfriend then, Vikram Bhatt, took it upon himself to complete the project. The film had a limited release and failed to perform at the box office with some critics terming it as "outdated". In Teesri Aankh: The Hidden Camera, Patel played the role of a mute girl who witnesses a murder. She learned sign language for the role. She was next cast alongside Sanjay Dutt in Tathastu, based on Denzel Washington's thriller John Q (2002). Patel's fifth release in 2006, Ankahee, earned her critical praise, despite emerging as a commercial failure at the box office. The film centred around an extramarital affair with Patel playing a housewife whose husband cheats on her with a model. To understand the mentality of a wronged wife, Patel spoke to her own grandmother who had undergone a similar situation. Diganta Guha from Hindustan Times noted "...it's Patel's performance that remains in your mind. She is dignity personified in the film, playing a woman betrayed in marriage, going all out to save it and in the end choosing her own path." Later that year, she appeared alongside Akshaye Khanna and Priyanka Chopra in Dharmesh Darshan's romantic comedy Aap Ki Khatir.

=== Career fluctuations and Gadar 2 (2007–present) ===
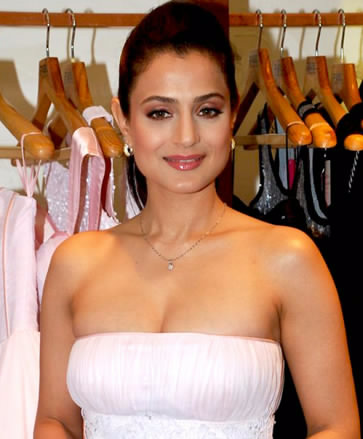
Patel in 2009

After appearing in a series of box office flops during 2003–2006, Patel's career prospects improved in 2007. Her first release that year was the ensemble comedy drama Honeymoon Travels Pvt. Ltd.. The low-budget film achieved moderate success at the box office. Patel played the role of Karan Khanna's talkative wife who tries to overcome her husband's gay leanings. Her comic timing in the film was well received. Later in 2007, she co-starred opposite Akshay Kumar, Vidya Balan and Shiney Ahuja in Priyadarshan's horror comedy Bhool Bhulaiyaa as a rejected adopted girl who is accused of trying to disrupt the marriage of her childhood crush.

In an attempt to renew her image, Patel appeared in a bikini item number, "Lazy Lamhe", in Kunal Kohli's fantasy comedy-drama Thoda Pyaar Thoda Magic (2008). She learned scuba diving for the song that took 15 days to complete. Although the film flopped at the box office, Patel managed to garner attention for her appearance.

After the release of Thoda Pyaar Thoda Magic, Patel signed on to two comedies; Run Bhola Run and Chatur Singh Two Star. However, both films were continuously delayed despite being completed in 2009. She next attempted a comeback by signing on to Rajkumar Santoshi's Power. Patel was set to alongside an ensemble cast which also included Amitabh Bachchan, Sanjay Dutt, Anil Kapoor, Ajay Devgn and Kangana Ranaut, but the film was shelved after eight days of principal photography. Despite repeated attempts to land a starring role, Patel dropped out of several projects due to various reasons.

Following a two-and-a-half-year sabbatical, she made a comeback to the Telugu film industry in a brief role with Parama Veera Chakra (2011) alongside Nandamuri Balakrishna; the film flopped. In the same year, the long-delayed Chatur Singh Two Star saw the light of day after three years and emerged as a critical and commercial disaster. Run Bhola Run remains unreleased following the shutting down of the production company Shree Ashtavinayak Cine Vision, despite the trailer and posters being unveiled in late 2010.

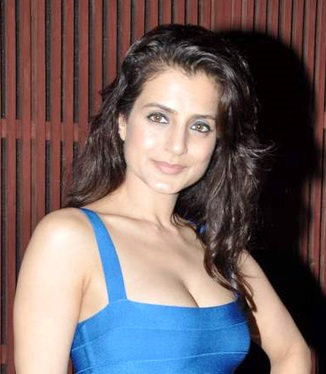
Patel in 2015

On 23 April 2011, Patel hosted an event launching her production company, Ameesha Patel Productions, in collaboration with her friend and business partner Kuunal Goomer. Their debut home production, Desi Magic, was launched at an event on 2 April 2013.

In 2013, Patel returned to Hindi cinema with a special appearance in Abbas–Mustan's Race 2, replacing Sameera Reddy as Anil Kapoor's ditzy assistant. Though the film was critically panned, it emerged a box office success. She followed it with a starring role alongside Neil Nitin Mukesh in Shortcut Romeo, a Hindi remake of the 2006 Tamil hit Thiruttu Payale. The film opened to mixed reviews and performed poorly at the box office.

The teaser trailer for Desi Magic was launched on 18 December 2014.

In 2018, she played a movie star in the ensemble action comedy Bhaiaji Superhit alongside Sunny Deol and Preity Zinta, a production in the making since 2012. The film was poorly received by critics.

On 19 January 2019, it was announced her debut home production Desi Magic has been complete after six years in the making. However, it remains unreleased due to a legal battle.

In the same year, she entered the reality show Bigg Boss 13 with a twist. She was seen as the maalkin of the house for the first week to give different interesting tasks to the housemates.

In 2023, Patel returned to acting after five years by reprising her role as Sakeena in Gadar 2, 22 years since its predecessor released. Despite a mixed critical response, the film was declared an all time blockbuster. "Ameesha Patel doesn’t have much to do and is competent in her emotional scenes," noted Devesh Sharma of Filmfare. She followed it up with a special appearance in Mystery of the Tattoo.

In 2024, Patel appeared in the romantic thriller Tauba Tera Jalwa, a delayed production since 2020.

== Other work ==
=== Stage performances ===
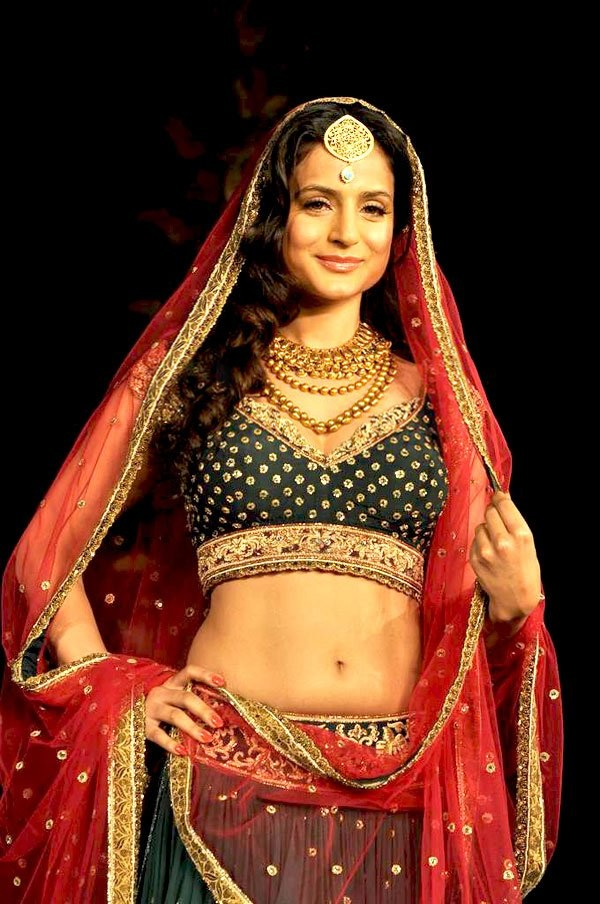
Ameesha Patel during a ramp walk in 2012

Patel performed in a number of concerts and world tours during her career. Her first world tour; The Roshans: Hrithik Live in Concert (2001), along with Hrithik Roshan, was performed across India. In 2004, Patel took part in a series of concerts in the world tour Craze 2004 alongside Hrithik Roshan, Saif Ali Khan and Lara Dutta. In 2005, Patel participated in Adnan Sami's world tour Kuch Dil Se… that was performed across the US and Canada from 15 April till 15 May. In October 2008, she participated in Himesh Reshammiya's comeback concert Karzzzz Musical Curtain Raiser joined by Neha Dhupia, Riya Sen and Amrita Arora. In December 2008, she took part in Akshay Kumar's Christmas Eve show Chandni Chowk to Hong along with Bipasha Basu, Priyanka Chopra, Riya Sen, Aarti Chhabria, Himesh Reshammiya and Punjabi rapper Bohemia as part of a promotional campaign for Kumar's film Chandni Chowk to China (2009). In response to 26/11, many New Year's Eve concerts for 2009 were cancelled, but Patel and Country Club India decided to go ahead with their show because they thought it would be against the terrorists' will.

=== Humanitarian work ===
In September 2004, Patel joined PETA, one of the organisations championing the cause of animals, as part of an advertising campaign which highlights the lives of captive animals in a zoo who are robbed of their natural surroundings for the amusement of others. Patel posed as a petrified prisoner in a jail cell to throw focus on the plight of animals in zoos. She said:

George Washington, Nelson Mandela, Mahatma Gandhi... we had them. Animals don't; they need us. Let's fight for their freedom.

In February 2005, along with other Bollywood stars, Patel performed at the HELP! Telethon Concert raising money for the victims of the 2004 Indian Ocean earthquake. She also took part in the Temptations 2005 charity function in New Delhi on 24 December 2005 at the Indira Gandhi Indoor Stadium in aid of the National Centre for Promotion of Employment of Disabled Persons (NCPEDP), a leading disabled rights' group.

In November 2006, Patel joined an NGO called PlanetRead, which helps people in villages to learn reading through film songs. In October 2007, Patel along with John Abraham and Kirron Kher joined the United Nations Office on Drugs and Crime (UNODC) to curb human trafficking in India.

== In the media ==
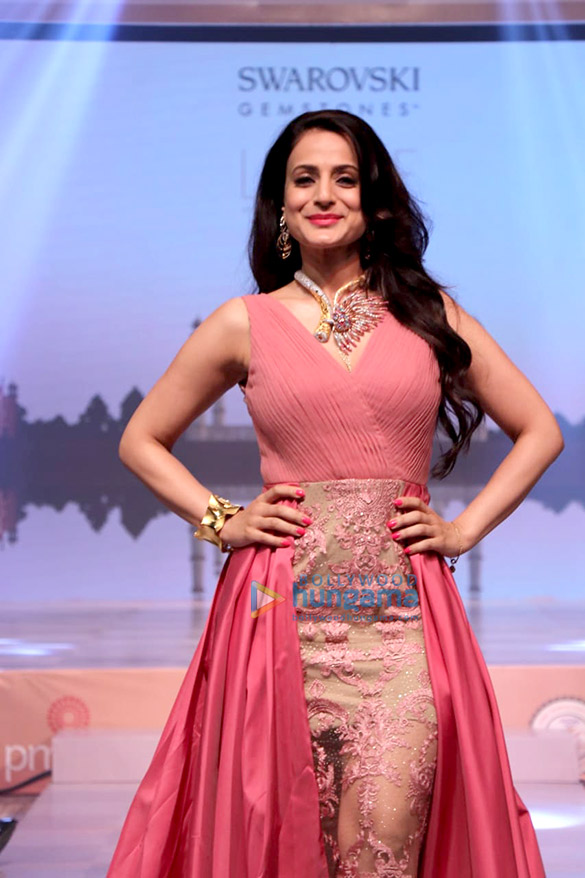
Patel walks for the All India Gem And Jewellery Domestic Council

Between 2002 and 2005, Patel made an appearance in a number of talk shows such as Rendezvous with Simi Garewal and The Manish Malhotra Show. In 2006, Patel appeared as the guest judge on the special Valentine's Day episode of the singing talent contest Indian Idol 2.

Patel is frequently cited as one of the sexiest Bollywood actresses. Rediff featured Patel as one of Bollywood's sexiest actresses and top Bollywood actresses of 2001. She was ranked tenth on Rediff's list of 2008's Sexiest Actresses. Patel was also cited by Rediff as one of 2008's Sexiest Magazine Cover Girls. She has featured on the cover of Maxim India three times, as well as other men magazines such as The Man, FHM, and Man's World.

== Personal life ==
In 1999, Patel met filmmaker Vikram Bhatt on the set of their first film together; Aap Mujhe Achche Lagne Lage (2002), and they started dating since the film's release. Later, it caused a rift between the Patel and Bhatt families with Patel running through a financial crisis after her father used her hard-earned money to resurrect a family business, causing misunderstandings between Patel and her parents. In July 2004, Patel sent a legal notice to her father for mismanaging her accounts and assets amounting to Rs 120 million and demanding the money back. Patel's relationship with Bhatt was often reported to the media speculating on a possible marriage. In January 2008, the media reported that Patel and Bhatt broke their five-year relationship. Bhatt confirmed the break-up in a conversation with Mid-Day. Shortly afterwards, Patel's parents explained their willingness to reconcile with their daughter and that "everybody is happy about the break-up" but their relationship remained strained. On 12 March 2008, Patel was spotted with London-based businessman Kanav Puri at Wills Lifestyle India Fashion Week. In June 2008, she confirmed their relationship in an interview with Mid-Day: "I did not admit to Kanav sooner because he's very special and I did not want to jinx it. It was too precious for me to talk about it to people. It's almost six months now and now I am feeling secure and now I know our relationship is too strong for anything or anyone to come between us." The media once reported that she married Puri but she denied these rumours.

In August 2009, Mumbai Mirror reported that Patel and her brother, Ashmit, had patched up on the occasion of Raksha Bandhan and were spotted together at PVR Cinemas in Juhu. Although the siblings agreed that the matter is sorted, they preferred not to speak about it publicly. In December 2009, Patel's mother Asha had revealed they have finally ended their five-year estrangement during an interview with The Times of India.

In September 2010, Mumbai Mirror reported that Patel broke off the relationship with her long-time boyfriend Kanav Puri, to focus on her career. She confirmed it via Twitter.

=== Controversies ===
In August 2006, an Air India employee had filed a police complaint, alleging that Patel had misbehaved with her after her companion was not upgraded to first class on the Mumbai-New York flight on 18 August. Patel was on her way to attend India's Independence Day parade in New York. Officers at the police station said Patel could be called in and warned about her behaviour, if charges against her are proved, and would be questioned once she returns from abroad. Later, CISF personnel have corroborated the Air India employees' version of the incident. Once Patel returned to India, she stated that the employees "are only trying to safeguard themselves by filing a false complaint against us." Incidentally, there was also a drunken passenger, who joined in this verbal fight. Afterwards, the organisers of the annual parade sent a written apology and a clarification to Patel and said it had booked two first class seats for Patel and her companion for the Mumbai-New York flight but the booking was automatically transferred from one flight to another, creating confusion.

== Filmography ==
Key
†	Denotes films that have not yet been released

Year	Title	Role	Notes
2000	Kaho Naa... Pyaar Hai	Sonia Saxena	
2000	Badri	Sarayu	Telugu film
2001	Gadar: Ek Prem Katha	Sakeena "Sakku" Singh	
2001	Yeh Zindagi Ka Safar	Sarena Devan	
2002	Kranti	Sanjana Roy	
2002	Kya Yehi Pyaar Hai	Sandhya Patil	
2002	Aap Mujhe Achche Lagne Lage	Sapna Dholakia	
2002	Humraaz	Priya Singhania	
2002	Yeh Hai Jalwa	Sonia Singh	
2003	Pudhiya Geethai	Jo	Tamil film
2003	Parwana	Pooja	
2004	Suno Sasurjee	Kiran Saxena	
2004	Naani	Priya	Telugu film
2005	Vaada	Pooja	
2005	Elaan	Priya	
2005	Zameer: The Fire Within	Pooja	
2005	Narasimhudu	Subba Lakshmi	Telugu film
2005	Mangal Pandey: The Rising	Jwala	
2006	Mere Jeevan Saathi	Anjali	
2006	Humko Tumse Pyaar Hai	Durga	
2006	Teesri Aankh: The Hidden Camera	Ammu	
2006	Tathastu	Sarita Rajput	
2006	Ankahee	Nandita Saxena	
2006	Aap Ki Khatir	Shirani Khanna	
2007	Honeymoon Travels Pvt. Ltd.	Pinky Kapoor	
2007	Heyy Babyy	Herself	Special appearance in the title song ''Heyy Babyy''
2007	Bhool Bhulaiyaa	Radha Chaturvedi	
2007	Om Shanti Om	Herself	Special appearance
2008	Thoda Pyaar Thoda Magic	Malaika	credited as Ameesha
2011	Parama Veera Chakra	Rajni	Telugu film
2011	Chatur Singh Two Star	Sonia Varma	credited as Ameesha
2013	Race 2	Cherry	
2013	Shortcut Romeo	Monica	
2017	Aakatayi	Herself	Telugu film; Special appearance in title song "Ammammo Ela"
2018	Bhaiaji Superhit	Mallika Kapoor	
2023	Gadar 2	Sakeena	
2023	Mystery of the Tattoo	Chitra Devi	Special appearance
2024	Tauba Tera Jalwa	Laila Khan	

=== Television ===
Year	Title	Role	Notes	Ref.
2019	Bigg Boss 13	Herself	Guest appearance	

=== Music video appearances ===
Year	Title	Album	Singer	Ref.
2004	"Hai Kasam Tu Na Ja"	Teri Kasam	Adnan Sami	
2004	"O Meri Jaan"	Teri Kasam	Adnan Sami	
