= Pad Man (soundtrack) =

Soundtrack album by Amit Trivedi
- Released: 18 January 2018
- Recorded: 2015–2018
- Genre: Feature film soundtrack
- Length: 21:03
- Language: Hindi
- Label: Zee Music Company
- Producer: Amit Trivedi

Amit Trivedi chronology
Prem Ratan Dhan Payo (2015)	Pad Man (2018)	Raid (2018)
External audio
- Audio Jukebox on YouTube

Singles from Padman
- 1. "Aaj Se Teri" Released: 27 December 2015; 2. "The Padman Song" Released: 29 December 2015; 3. "Hu Ba Hu" Released: 4 January 2018; 4. "Saale Sapne" Released: 10 January 2018

Pad Man is the soundtrack album to the 2018 film of the same name directed by R. Balki, starring Akshay Kumar, which is based on the life of social entrepreneur Arunachalam Muruganantham and partially inspired from Twinkle Khanna's 2016 book The Legend of Lakshmi Prasad. The album featured five songs composed by Amit Trivedi and written by Kausar Munir. Preceded by four singles, the album was released under the Zee Music Company label on 18 January 2018.

== Release ==
The album was preceded with the first song "Aaj Se Teri", which released with an accompanying music video on 22 December 2017. Sung by Arijit Singh, the song is picturized on the relationship between Lakshmikant Chauhan (Kumar) and his wife Gayatri (Radhika Apte). The second song, "The Padman Song" was released on 29 December. It is a folk number, sung by Mika Singh and is the titular song from the album. The third song "Hu Ba Hu" was released on 4 January 2018. The song is pictured on Lakshmikant and Pari Walla (Sonam Kapoor). The fourth song "Saale Sapne" was released on 10 January. It is a motivational number, which The Indian Express, noted that is based on "the real Pad Man" Arunachalam Muruganantham. The fifth song "Sayaani" was released along with the album on 18 January, under the Zee Music Company label; a video of the song was released on 2 February.

== Reception ==
The soundtrack received mixed reviews from critics. Devarsi Ghosh of Scroll.in noted "The composer seems to have dialed down his creative spirit to produce an average soundtrack with the staple ingredients – an Arijit Singh love song, a title track celebrating the hero, and an inspiring pop-rock number – that anybody with lesser talent could have come up with." Vipin Nair of The Hindu summarized "Trivedi's work in Padman is propped up by one winning melody". Suanshu Khurana of The Indian Express wrote "Out of the five compositions that has generated much buzz, some are pleasant, while some are completely forgettable. But what really hits the mark, is the careful and sharp play of words by Kausar Munir, who shines more than Amit Trivedi in some pieces" adding that the music "works only partially".

On a positive note, Karthik Srinivasan of Milliblog stated "Amit Trivedi’s soundtrack for PadMan is mere hygiene level." Bollywood Hungama summarized "The music of Pad Man promises to fit in well to the narrative and has just the right songs for the various situations in the film. Instead of packing the soundtrack with three of four love songs that may not be relevant to the overall plot, the entire team does well to mix it up well and ensure that the soundtrack compliments the film as a whole." Indo-Asian News Service based critic wrote "Amit Trivedi's music is effective and it does elevate the viewing experience. The songs; "Aaj Se Teri" has interesting lyrics and "Ladki Sayani ho gayi" that celebrates womanhood is well-choreographed. The other two songs don't register at all."

Tiasa Bhowal of The Financial Express wrote "Amit Trivedi's music has a very fresh appeal and generates emotion aplenty to go along with the scenes. 'Aaj Se Teri' is a feel-good number and is a relatable song. 'Hu Ba Hu' sung by Trivedi himself will get you going, and the title track by Mika Singh is foot-tapping and at the same time inspiring." Raja Sen of NDTV wrote "Amit Trivedi's music is rather lovely, though the background score is irritatingly overdone as it tries to spell things out, swelling with hope and sighing with despair and doing so repetitively enough for us to notice. This is one of the reasons why, at some points, the film feels stretched."

== Track listing ==
All lyrics are written by Kausar Munir.

No.	Title	Singer(s)	Length
1.	"Aaj Se Teri"	Arijit Singh, Amit Trivedi	5:12
2.	"The Pad Man Song"	Mika Singh	3:23
3.	"Hu Ba Hu"	Amit Trivedi	3:36
4.	"Saale Sapne"	Mohit Chauhan	4:42
5.	"Sayaani"	Amit Trivedi, Yashita Sharma, Jonita Gandhi, Yashika Sikka, Rani Kaur	4:10
Total length:			21:03
