= Radhika Apte =

Indian actress (born 1985)

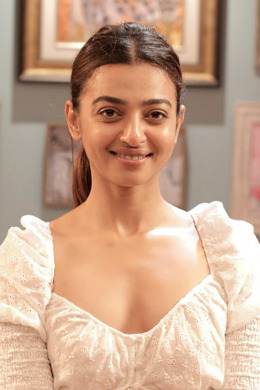
- Apte in 2018
- Born: Radhika Charudutt Apte; 7 September 1985 (age 41); Vellore, Tamil Nadu, India
- Education: Fergusson College
- Occupation: Actress
- Years active: 2005–present
- Spouse: Benedict Taylor (m. 2012)
- Children: 1

Radhika Charudutt Apte (Marathi pronunciation: [ɾaːd̪ʰikaː əpʈe]) (born 7 September 1985) is an Indian actress who works predominantly in Hindi films and television along with films in Bengali, Marathi, Tamil, Telugu, and Malayalam. She began acting in theatre and made her film debut with a brief role in the fantasy drama Vaah! Life Ho Toh Aisi! (2005). Her first lead role was in the 2009 Bengali drama Antaheen. She gained attention for her supporting roles in three of her 2015 Bollywood productions: the revenge drama Badlapur, the comedy Hunterrr, and the biographical film Manjhi - The Mountain Man. Her leading roles in the 2016 independent films Phobia and Parched earned her acclaim.

In 2018, Apte starred in three Netflix productions – the anthology film Lust Stories, the thriller series Sacred Games, and the horror mini-series Ghoul. She was nominated for an International Emmy Award for her work in the first of these, becoming the first Indian actress to do so. She then starred in the Netflix films Raat Akeli Hai (2020) and Monica, O My Darling (2022), and portrayed Noor Inayat Khan in the American film A Call to Spy (2019). Her performance in Sister Midnight (2024) earned her a nomination for a British Independent Film Award.

In addition to her work in independent films, Apte has also played the leading lady in mainstream films, such as the Tamil action film Kabali (2016), the Hindi biographical film Pad Man (2018), and the Hindi black comedy Andhadhun (2018), all of which were commercially successful. She has been married to London-based musician Benedict Taylor since 2012.

== Early life ==
Radhika Charudutt Apte was born on 7 September 1985 at Christian Medical College, Vellore, Tamil Nadu, where her mother, Jayashree Charudutta Apte, and her father, Charudutta Achyut Apte, both Chitpavan Brahmins, were resident doctors. Her father subsequently became a neurosurgeon and chairman of Sahyadri Hospital, Pune. She is an Economics and Mathematics graduate from Fergusson College, Pune. In Pune, she initially studied in a regular school, and then was homeschooled along with four friends by their parents living in the same building, who did not want their children to go through the regular schooling system. Apte found this experience liberating, as it boosted her self-confidence.

While growing up in Pune, Apte trained under Kathak exponent, Rohini Bhate, for eight years. It was during this time that Apte became involved in theatre in Pune, and decided to go to Mumbai to join films. However, a few months later, Apte got discouraged by her experience in Mumbai and returned to her family in Pune. Apte recounted these times in an interview with Scoop Whoop in 2018, as a learning yet demoralising experience, wherein she managed with a salary of ₹8,000 to ₹10,000 from theatre roles and having to put up with odd landlords and roommates in Goregaon, where she lived as a paying guest. During this time, Apte acted in her first movie, a Marathi film called Gho Mala Asala Hawa (2009). After this she acted in Rakta Charitra, Rakta Charitra 2, and I am.

On returning to Pune, Apte made an overnight decision of going to London for a year, where she studied contemporary dance at London's Trinity Laban Conservatoire of Music and Dance for a year. Apte said her experience in London was life-changing, as she was exposed to a completely different and liberating way of working professionally. There she met her future husband Benedict Taylor, who subsequently moved to Pune with her, travelling regularly to Mumbai for his work while Apte still did not want to return to Mumbai because of her earlier experience. After a year, she finally agreed to move to Mumbai, and her second experience in Mumbai was far more positive, as she no longer felt lonely.

== Career ==
=== Early roles (2005–10) ===
Apte first appeared with a small role in the Hindi film Vaah! Life Ho Toh Aisi! in 2005, a project she did "just for fun" while still in college. Actor Rahul Bose, who had seen Apte perform in Anahita Oberoi's play Bombay Black, suggested her name to director Aniruddha Roy Chowdhury who cast her in his National award-winning Bengali film Antaheen along with Aparna Sen, Sharmila Tagore and Rahul Bose. She played the role of Brinda Roy Menon, a TV journalist, in Antaheen. Riddhima Seal, writing for The Times of India, called Apte a "revelation", further adding "With eyes that speak a thousand words, her passion for work and the loneliness of her heart as she waits to chat every night with that special stranger just strikes the right chord".

In 2009, Apte had her first Indian release, KBC productions' Gho Mala Asla Hava by Sumitra Bhave and Sunil Sukthankar, in which she appeared as Savitri, a village girl. She later collaborated with Bhave and Sukthankar again on the Hindi docufiction Mor Dekhne Jungle Mein. It was in that year that she also worked on Jatin Wagle's Ek Indian Manoos, Akash Khurana's Life Online, about "a bunch of youngsters working in a BPO" and Amol Palekar's Indian film, Samaantar. In 2010, she was seen in Maneej Premnath's thriller The Waiting Room and later, appeared in a significant role in Ram Gopal Varma's Rakta Charitra and its sequel. On returning from London, Apte was offered a role in a large blockbuster production Hindi film, but was (in her words) kicked out of it, because they felt she was too fat to be in that film.

=== Breakthrough and rise to prominence (2011–present) ===
In 2011, Apte appeared in the anthology film I Am and in Shor in the City under Ekta Kapoor's Balaji Motion Pictures. She worked for the third time with the Bhave-Sukthankar duo on Ha Bharat Majha (2012), a film inspired by Anna Hazare's movement that was shot in 14 days and screened at various film festivals. Her two other 2012 releases were Tukaram in Marathi and Dhoni, her maiden Tamil film. For her performance in the latter, she was nominated for SIIMA Award for Best Actress in a Supporting Role.

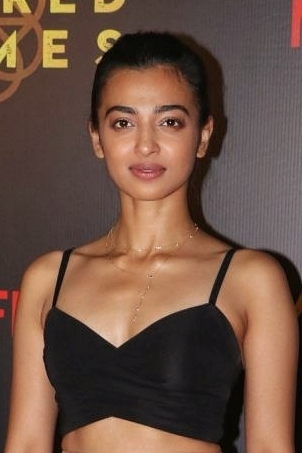
Apte at an event

In 2013, she was seen in the Bengali film Rupkatha Noy. About her character, she said, "I play Sananda, an IT engineer, who is a single mother of a three-year-old child. Sananda had a dreadful past, which keeps haunting her". Apte's first four 2014 releases were Postcard, Pendulum, Legend and Vetri Selvan in three languages – Bengali, Telugu and Tamil, respectively—after which another film of hers, Lai Bhaari, released. Pendulum, which was described by Apte as a "story on magic realism which takes you through multiple layers of parallel realities, or apparent realities", had her playing a working woman in a relationship with a younger man, while in Vetri Selvan, she had played the role of a lawyer. Legend and Lai Bhaari were commercial successes, the latter breaking the opening weekend box office record and becoming the highest grossing Marathi film of all time.

In 2015, Apte gained wider recognition for her roles in six feature films released in the first eight months. In the year's first release, Sriram Raghavan's Badlapur, she had a minor supporting role, for which she shot for six days. Despite appearing only briefly in the latter part of the film, she was widely recognized and appreciated for her performance, with several critics stating that she stood out in the ensemble cast. Rediff's Raja Sen, in particular, wrote that she was "sensational" and featured in "possibly the film's finest" moment. Following a Malayalam release, Haram, her first in the language, and a Telugu release, Lion, she had her next Hindi release, the sex comedy Hunterrr directed by Harshvardhan Kulkarni. Although the film opened to mixed reviews, Apte again earned praise for her performance. While Shubha Shetty-Saha from mid-day.com described her as "excellent in an absolutely realistic role", Filmfare's Rachit Gupta wrote, "While you're at it, hand one (award) to Radhika Apte...She really comes into her own, in a character that's unconventional and full of surprises". With Badlapur and Hunterrr both achieving commercial success and winning Apte critical acclaim, she grew in popularity, breaking into the mainstream Bollywood scene, with the media dubbing her the "latest sensation of Bollywood", Bollywood's new "go-to girl" and the "new constant in Indian cinema". HuffPost India wrote, "Radhika Apte is on her way to stardom, whether she likes it or not". In late August, two more Hindi films of her, Ketan Mehta's critically acclaimed biogeographical film Manjhi - The Mountain Man, based on Dashrath Manjhi, featuring Apte as Manjhi's wife Falguni Devi, and Kaun Kitne Paani Mein, a satire on water scarcity featuring Apte as an agriculture graduate, released a week apart. Her next film was the Tamil gangster-drama Kabali, in which she was featured as the wife of Rajinikanth. Upon the release, her performance received positive feedback from critics, and the film proved to be a major commercial success as well.

In 2018, Apte co-starred with Akshay Kumar in R. Balki's comedy-drama Pad Man, based on a short story in Twinkle Khanna's book, The Legend of Lakshmi Prasad. It is inspired by the life of Arunachalam Muruganantham from Tamil Nadu, who campaigned for menstrual hygiene in rural India. Apte's role was that of a shy homemaker whose husband (Kumar) invents low-cost sanitary napkins. Saibal Chatterjee of NDTV wrote, "Radhika Apte is, as always, a scene-stealer. She contributes majorly to ensuring that the exchanges between the protagonist and his wife do not veer into corniness."

Apte made her directorial debut with The Sleepwalkers, starring Gulshan Devaiah and Shahana Goswami. The Sleepwalkers is in competition at the Palm Springs International ShortFest 2020, under the Best Midnight Short category.

Among Apte's other films are three Hindi language projects, The Field, the feature debut of Rohit Karn Batra, Leena Yadav's Parched, a U.S.-Indian co-production, and Bombairiya, an Indo – British production and a Tamil project, Ula.

=== Theatre ===
Apte is actively involved with theatre and has been part of several stage plays, mostly in Hindi language. She is associated with Mohit Takalkar's theatre troupe Aasakta Kalamanch in her hometown and has acted in plays like Tu, Purnaviram, Matra Ratra and Samuel Beckett's That Time with Rehan Engineer. She also performed a commercial Hindi play, Kanyadaan, and an English play named Bombay Black. In 2013, she was part of an Indian play named Uney Purey Shahar Ek, which was an adaptation of Girish Karnad's Benda Kaalu on Toast ("Baked Beans of Toast"). She has also stated that she plans to do an English play in London. Apte has said that she prefers to work in experimental theatre.

=== Short films ===
Radhika Apte has also acted in a number of short films, including Darmiyan, in which she played a college girl, Ekta, and Vakratunda Swaha, which was filmed by Ashish Avikunthak over a period of 12 years. She played one of the lead roles in Anurag Kashyap's film on eve teasing, That Day After Everyday, which released on YouTube in 2012. She has played the title role in Sujoy Ghosh's 2015 Bengali short film Ahalya.

== Personal life ==
Apte met Benedict Taylor in 2011 in London during her year-long sabbatical when she had gone to learn contemporary dance. Director Sarang Sathaye, a friend of Radhika, in October 2012, said that the two had been living together for a while and that a registered marriage took place a month before the official ceremony was said to be held in March 2013. In 2024, she gave birth to their daughter.

Apte has spoken out against sexual harassment in the Indian film industry. She supported the MeToo movement in India, stating that she was hopeful that it could bring about a change with major industry.

== Media image ==
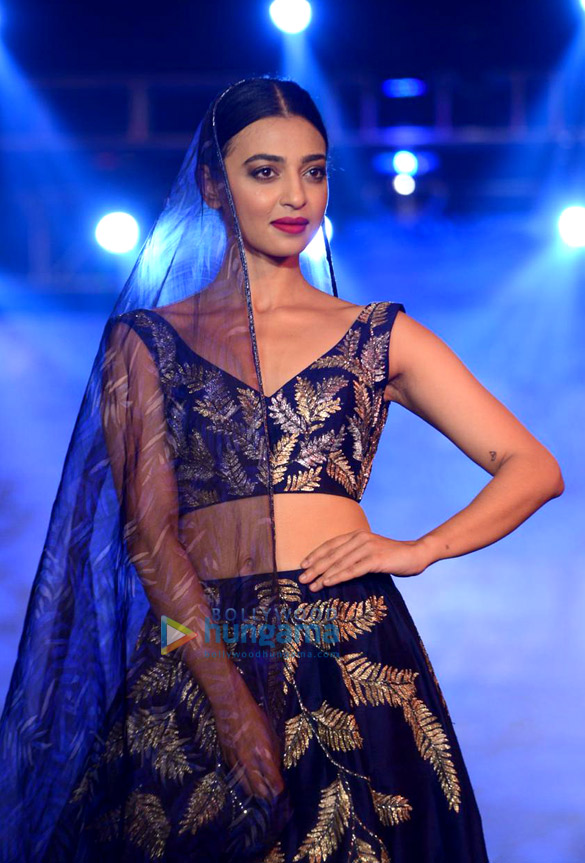
Apte in 2018

Tanisha Bhattacharya of Filmfare termed her a "powerhouse performer", who is widely known as the "poster child of OTT". Natasha Dsouza of Femina termed her "happy-go-lucky", "outspoken" and noted, "Apte is a rarity and a new-gen star who's known for two things: essaying complex roles and speaking her mind." Huzan Tata of Verve termed her a "poster girl for regional and art-house cinema". Nihit Bhave of Hindustan Times said, "Apte has often taken on roles that other actresses would have deemed insignificant." In Rediff.com's "Best Bollywood Actresses" list, she was placed 3rd in 2011, 2nd in 2015 and 7th in 2022. Apte has been described in the media as one of the highest paid actor on OTT. Apte is an endorser for brands and products such as Clinique, Sanfe, MCaffeine and RIOPads. Her performance in Phobia is regarded as one of the "100 Greatest Performances of the Decade" by Film Companion.

== Filmography ==
Key
†	Denotes films that have not yet been released

=== Film ===
List of Radhika Apte film credits
Year	Title	Role	Language	Notes	Ref.
2005	Vaah! Life Ho Toh Aisi!	Anjali	Hindi		
2009	Antaheen	Brinda	Bengali		
2009	Samaantar	Rewa	Marathi		
2009	Gho Mala Asla Hava	Savitri	Marathi		
2010	The Waiting Room	Tina	Hindi		
2010	Rakta Charitra	Kattula Nandini	Telugu	Bilingual films	
2010	Rakta Charitra	Kattula Nandini	Hindi	Bilingual films	
2010	Rakta Charitra 2	Kattula Nandini	Telugu	Bilingual films	
2010	Rakta Charitra 2	Kattula Nandini	Hindi	Bilingual films	
2011	I Am	Natasha	Hindi	Segment: "Abhimanyu"	
2011	Shor in the City	Sapna	Hindi		
2012	Dhoni	Nalini	Tamil	Bilingual film	
2012	Dhoni	Nalini	Telugu	Bilingual film	
2012	Ha Bharat Maza	Unknown	Marathi		
2012	Tukaram	Aavli	Marathi		
2013	Rupkatha Noy	Sananda	Bengali		
2013	All in All Azhagu Raja	Meenakshi Raamasamy	Tamil		
2014	Pendulum	Nandita	Bengali		
2014	Legend	Radhika	Telugu		
2014	Postcard	Gulzar	Marathi		
2014	Vetri Selvan	Sujatha	Tamil		
2014	Lai Bhaari	Kavita	Marathi		
2015	Badlapur	Kanchan Khatri "Koko"	Hindi		
2015	Haram	Isha	Malayalam		
2015	Hunterrr	Tripti Gokhale	Hindi		
2015	Lion	Sarayu	Telugu		
2015	Manjhi – The Mountain Man	Phaguniya	Hindi		
2015	Kaun Kitne Paani Mein	Paro	Hindi		
2015	The Bright Day	Rukmini	Hindi		
2015	X: Past Is Present	Rija	Hindi	Segment: "Biryani"	
2016	Parched	Lajjo	Hindi		
2016	Phobia	Mehak Deo	Hindi		
2016	Kabali	Kumudhavalli Kabaleeswaran (Kumudha)	Tamil		
2017	Madly	Archana	English	Segment: "Clean Shaven"	
2018	Pad Man	Gayatri Chauhan	Hindi		
2018	Lust Stories	Kalindi Dasgupta	Hindi	Anurag Kashyap's segment; also co-writer	
2018	Andhadhun	Sophie	Hindi		
2018	Baazaar	Priya Rai	Hindi		
2019	Bombairiya	Meghna	Hindi		
2019	Chithiram Pesuthadi 2	Durga	Tamil		
2019	The Wedding Guest	Samira	English		
2019	The Ashram	Gayatri	English		
2019	A Call to Spy	Noor Inayat Khan	English		
2020	Raat Akeli Hai	Radha	Hindi		
2022	Forensic	SI Megha Sharma	Hindi		
2022	Vikram Vedha	Priya Vikram	Hindi		
2022	Monica, O My Darling	ACP Vijayashanti Naidu	Hindi		
2023	Mrs Undercover	Durga	Hindi		
2024	Merry Christmas	Rosie	Hindi	Bilingual film; cameo appearance	
2024	Merry Christmas	Rosie	Hindi	Bilingual film; cameo appearance	
2024	Merry Christmas	Rosie	Tamil	Bilingual film; cameo appearance	
2024	Sister Midnight	Uma	Hindi		
2025	Last Days	Meera Ganali	English		
2025	Saali Mohabbat	Smita / Kavita	Hindi		
2025	Raat Akeli Hai: The Bansal Murders	Radha	Hindi	Special appearance	
2026	Lust Stories 3	Padma	Hindi	Antholgy	

=== Short films ===
List of Radhika Apte short film credits
Year	Title	Role	Language	Ref.
2006	Darmiyan	Ekta	English/Hindi	
2010	Vakratunda Swaha	Unknown	Bengali	
2013	That Day After Everyday	Rekha	Hindi	
2015	Ahalya	Ahalya	Bengali	
2015	The Calling	Shaheen	English	
2016	Kriti	Dr. Kalpana	Hindi	

=== Television ===
List of Radhika Apte television credits
Year	Title	Role	Language	Notes	Ref.
2015	Stories by Rabindranath Tagore	Binodini	Hindi	Episode: "Chokher Bali"; TV drama	
2018	Sacred Games	Anjali Mathur	Hindi	Season 1	
2018	Ghoul	Nida Rahim	Hindi/English		
2021	OK Computer	Laxmi Suri	Hindi		
2023	Made in Heaven	Pallavi Menke	Hindi	Season 2	
2025	Akka	Rudra	Hindi		

=== Theatre ===
List of Radhika Apte theatrical credits
Year	Production	Language	Notes
2003	Nako Re Baba	Marathi	
2003	Pan Amhala Khelayachay	Marathi	
2003	Brain Surgeon	English	British play
2006	Shobha Yatra	Marathi	
2006	Tu	Marathi	
2007	That Time	English	British play
2007	Poornaviram	Marathi	
2007	Kanyadaan	Marathi	
2007	Matra Ratra	Marathi	
2008	Bombay Black	English	
2009	Garbo	Marathi	
2009	Kashmir Kashmir	English	
2013	Uney Purey Shahar Ek	Marathi	

== Awards and nominations ==
List of Radhika Apte accolades
Year	Awards	Category	Film	Result	Ref.
2010	Screen Award	Best Female Debut	Rakta Charitra	Nominated	
2012	Vijay Awards	Best Supporting Actress	Dhoni	Nominated	
2012	South Indian International Movie Awards	Best Supporting Actress – Telugu	Dhoni	Nominated	
2015	Stardust Award	Best Supporting Actress	Badlapur	Nominated	
2015	Producers Guild Film Awards	Best Actress in a Supporting Role	Badlapur	Nominated	
2015	Stardust Award	Performer of the Year – Female	Manjhi – The Mountain Man	Nominated	
2016	Indian Film Festival of Los Angeles	Best Actress	Parched	Won	
2016	Indian Film Festival of Melbourne	Best Actress	Parched	Nominated	
2017	Tribeca Film Festival Award	Best Actress in an International Feature Film	Madly	Won	
2018	International Emmy Awards	Best Actress	Lust Stories	Nominated	
2018	Screen Awards	Best Supporting Actress	Andhadhun	Nominated	
2019	IIFA Awards	Best Supporting Actress	Andhadhun	Nominated	
2019	Zee Cine Awards	Best Actor in a Supporting Role – Female	Andhadhun	Nominated	
2019	iReel Awards	Best Breakthrough Artist	—N/a	Won	
2020	Palm Springs International Festival of Short Film	Best Midnight Shorts	The Sleepwalkers	Nominated	
2020	Filmfare OTT Awards	Best Actor Female – Web Originals	Raat Akeli Hai	Nominated	
2022	Pinkvilla Style Icons Awards	Super Stylish Universal Star	—N/a	Nominated	
2022	Lokmat Stylish Awards	Most Stylish OTT Star	—N/a	Won	
2022	Filmfare OTT Awards	Best Actor Female – Web Originals	Forensic	Nominated	
2023	IIFA Awards	Best Supporting Actress	Monica, O My Darling	Nominated	
2023	2023 Filmfare OTT Awards	Best Supporting Actress (Web Original Film)	Monica, O My Darling	Nominated	
