= Uff! Yeh Mohabbat =

1996 Indian Hindi-language film

Uff Yeh Mohabbat
- Directed by: Vipin Handa
- Written by: Vipin Handa
- Produced by: Vipin Handa
- Starring: Abhishek Kapoor; Twinkle Khanna
- Cinematography: Inderjit Bansel
- Music by: Nikhil-Vinay
- Release date: 13 December 1996
- Country: India
- Language: Hindi

Uff Yeh Mohabbat is a 1996 Indian Hindi-language romantic comedy film directed by Vipin Handa. The film stars Twinkle Khanna and Abhishek Kapoor. It was unsuccessful at box office.

== Cast ==
- Abhishek Kapoor as Raja
- Twinkle Khanna as Sonia Verma
- Anupam Kher as Tej Singh
- Reema Lagoo as Raja's mother
- Neena Gupta as Billo
- Sadiya Siddiqui as Chiclet
- Saeed Jaffrey as Viren Verma
- Gajendra Chouhan as Umang Usgaonkar
- Satyen Kappu as Principal Kapoor
- Shammi as Mrs. Usgaonkar

== Production ==
The film's casting was announced in 1993 and it was promoted as a "love story in Sikkim". It was shot around the same time as Khanna's other films Barsaat (1995) and Jaan (1996) but had a delayed release.

== Soundtrack ==
The music for the film was composed by Nikhil-Vinay. The lyrics were written by Rani Malik and Vipin Handa. Most popular song in album "Utra Na Dil Mein Koi" sang by Kumar Sanu.

#	Title	Singer(s)
1.	"Utra Na Dil Mein Koi"	Kumar Sanu
2.	"Deewani Deewani"	Sabri Brothers
3.	"Jab Se Hai Seekha Dil Ne"	Kumar Sanu, Alka Yagnik
4.	"Balmaa Kadar Nahin Jaani"	Sabri Brothers
5.	"Barso Ke Baad"	Kumar Sanu, Kavita Krishnamurthy
6.	"Meri Chhat Pe Aaya Karo"	Gurdas Maan, Kavita Krishnamurthy
7.	"Haan Mujhe Tumse Mohabbat"	Kumar Sanu, Kavita Krishnamurthy
8.	"Teri Lagan Lagi"	Sabri Brothers, Anupama Deshpande & Babul Supriyo
9.	"Maine Seekha Jo Pyar Ka Pahada"	Udit Narayan, Kavita Krishnamurthy
10.	"Daman Jala Diya"	Sabri Brothers

== Reception ==
According to the Indian film trade website Box Office India, the film had a worldwide gross of ₹1.27 crore (US$130,000) against a budget of ₹1.5 crore (US$160,000), being declared as a box office "Disaster".
