= Dil Tera Diwana =

Dil Tera Diwana may refer to:

- Dil Tera Diwana (1962 film), a 1962 Hindi comedy film
- Dil Tera Diwana (1996 film), a 1996 Indian Bollywood film
