= Where Is Vidya Balan =

2015 film by Srinivas Gattula

- Theatrical release poster
- Directed by: Srinivas Guttula
- Produced by: Venu Gopal Reddy
- Starring: Prince Cecil; Jyotii Sethi
- Cinematography: Chitti Babu K.
- Music by: Kamran Ahmed
- Production company: Shri Brahmaramba Creations
- Release date: 26 June 2015
- Running time: 122 minutes
- Country: India
- Language: Telugu

Where Is Vidya Balan is a 2015 Indian Telugu-language crime comedy film directed by Srinivas Guttula and starring Prince Cecil and Jyotii Sethi.

== Plot ==
Kiran (Prince) is a simple pizza delivery boy who falls in love with a doctor named Swathi (Jyotii Sethi). He starts wooing her and somehow succeeds in winning her love. While all this is going on, the couple suddenly get stuck in a chaotic situation where a deadly minister (Jaya Prakash Reddy), a reputed doctor (Rao Ramesh) and a funny don (Sampoornesh Babu) are after Vidya Balan. Who is this Vidya Balan? Why is everyone after her? And what is this chaotic situation all about?

== Cast ==
- Prince as Kiran
- Jyotii Sethi as Swati
- Madhunandan as Vasu
- Jaya Prakash Reddy as Minister Puli Naidu
- Rao Ramesh as Dr. Harsha
- Sampoornesh Babu as Ganta
- Ashish Vidyarthi as Police Inspector
- Sudigali Sudheer as Vasu's gangmate
- Getup Srinu as Kiran's gangmate
- Ravi Prakash as Doctor
- Raghu Karumanchi as Srinu
- Thagubothu Ramesh
- Saptagiri
- Prabhas Sreenu
- Shankar Melkote

== Production ==
The film marked Jyotii Sethi's Telugu film debut. She was approached by the makers after they saw her TV and print commercials in Mumbai. The final shooting schedule took place in March 2015.

== Reception ==
Y. Sunitha Chowdhary of The Hindu wrote, "Though the plot is interesting, a little more effort in fine tuning the script would have helped the film".
