= Jyotii Sethi =

Indian actress

- Born: Chandigarh, India
- Occupations: Actress; model
- Years active: 2015–present

Jyotii Sethi, is an Indian actress. She debuted in Telugu cinema with the film Where Is Vidya Balan, with Prince Cecil. She first gained recognition from Punjabi music video with Gippy Grewal, and a short film with Ammy Virk. She debuted in Bollywood with the film Phullu and her acting was highly appreciated by the critics.

== Filmography ==
| Year | Film | Role | Language | Note |
|---|---|---|---|---|
| 2015 | Where Is Vidya Balan | Swati | Telugu | Telugu debut |
| 2016 | Missing on a Weekend | Reeha Banerjee | Hindi | |
| 2017 | Happy Birthday | | Telugu | |
| 2017 | Phullu | Bigani | Hindi | |
| 2018 | Carry on Jatta 2 | Daljeet | Punjabi | |
