= Maya Vishwakarma =

Indian social worker and entrepreneur

- Born: October 13, 1982 (age 43); Mehragaon, Narsinghpur district, Madhya Pradesh, India
- Education: Rani Durgavati Vishwavidyalaya (BSc, MSc Biochemistry); All India Institute of Medical Sciences, New Delhi (Thesis work)
- Occupations: Social activist, Social entrepreneur
- Known for: Menstrual hygiene activism, Social work
- Title: Founder & Chairperson, Sukarma Foundation; Sarpanch, Saikheda Gram Panchayat
- Website: sukarmafoundation.org

Maya Vishwakarma (Hindi: माया विश्वकर्मा, born October 13, 1982) is an Indian social activist and entrepreneur known for her work on menstrual hygiene awareness in rural and tribal areas of Madhya Pradesh. She is also known as the "Padwoman of India". She founded the Sukarma Foundation in 2016 to address menstrual health issues, provide low-cost sanitary napkins, and promote rural development.

== Early life and education ==
Maya Vishwakarma was born in Mehragaon village in the Narsinghpur district of Madhya Pradesh, India, on October 13, 1982 in a Vaishwakarmana sect family. She grew up with limited access to information about menstruation, considered a taboo and significant health challenge in India. She has stated that she did not use sanitary pads until age 26 due to lack of access and awareness.

After completing high school, she attended Rani Durgavati Vishwavidyalaya (RDVV University) in Jabalpur, earning Bachelor's and Master's degrees in Biochemistry. She conducted Master's thesis work at the All India Institute of Medical Sciences, New Delhi (AIIMS) in Nuclear Medicine and later worked there as a Junior Research Fellow. She moved to the United States for a PhD program in Chemical and Biological Engineering at the South Dakota School of Mines and Technology, which she did not complete. Subsequently, she worked in cancer biology research, focusing on leukemia, at the University of California, San Francisco (UCSF).

== Career and activism ==
Vishwakarma cited personal health issues related to menstrual hygiene practices, along with her observations of limited awareness and access in her home region, as motivations for her later work. She was also inspired by Arunachalam Muruganantham, known for inventing a low-cost sanitary pad machine. She left her research position in the US and returned to India to engage in social work.

=== Sukarma Foundation ===
In 2016, Vishwakarma established the Sukarma Foundation, a non-profit organization registered in India and the US. The foundation works to increase awareness of menstrual hygiene, aiming to reduce associated stigma and educate women on health risks like RTIs, UTIs, and potential links to Cervical cancer. A key activity is the manufacture and distribution of low-cost sanitary napkins under the brand name "No Tension". A mini-factory was set up in Narsinghpur district in 2017, employing local women and utilizing machines based on Muruganantham's design to produce pads with SAP polymer sheets. The foundation has also expanded into providing primary healthcare services through telemedicine centers in remote areas and conducting health camps, including mammography screenings. Additionally, it offers skill development programs, such as tailoring, for local women. Vishwakarma has traveled within Madhya Pradesh to engage with communities regarding these initiatives.

During COVID-19 lockdown in India, her foundation setup camps at Nandner Village to distribute soaps, sanitisers, sanitary napkins, medicines, and other supplies to over 20,000 migrant workers.

=== Political career ===
Vishwakarma contested the 2014 Lok Sabha elections from the Narmadapuram constituency as an Aam Aadmi Party candidate, but was not elected. In July 2022, she was elected unopposed as the Sarpanch (village council head) of the Saikheda Gram Panchayat in Narsinghpur district.

== Awards and recognition ==
Vishwakarma is sometimes referred to as the "Padwoman of India" or "Pad-Jiji" (Pad Sister). Her 2016 documentary film, Swaraj Mumkin Hai (Independence is Possible), about the model village of Baghuwar in Narsinghpur district, received the 'Best Social Entrepreneur Short Film' award at the World Independent Film Festival in San Francisco in 2018. In 2020, she received the Devi Award for her menstrual hygiene awareness work.

== See also ==
- Women's health in India
- Menstrual hygiene management
