= Patiala Dreamz =

- Directed by: Abhishek Saxena
- Screenplay by: Shaheen Iqbal
- Story by: Anmol Kapoor; Jazz Punjabi
- Produced by: Anmol Kapoor; Parminder Kapoor
- Starring: Sarwar Ahuja; Madalasa Sharma; Sardar Sohi; Usha Bachani; Amita Nangia; Amrit pal Singh - Billa Bhajji
- Cinematography: Suhas Rao
- Edited by: Raj Rajeshwari Films
- Music by: Vickky Agarwal
- Release date: 10 January 2014
- Country: India
- Language: Punjabi

Patiala Dreamz

Soundtrack album by Javed Ali, Shahid Maliya, Ritu Pathak
- Released: 10 January 2014
- Genre: Punjabi, Bhangra
- Producer: Vickky Agarwal

Patiala Dreamz is a Punjabi-language film starring Sarwar Ahuja and Madalasa Sharma.

== Cast ==
- Sarwar Ahuja as Garry
- Madalasa Sharma as Reet
- Sardar Sohi as Teja Singh
- Usha Bachani as Jageer kaur
- Amita Nangia as Reets Mother
- Amrit pal Singh - Billa Bhajji as Major Sandhu

== Production ==
The Times of India reported that Patiala Dreamz is Parminder Kapoor's first film. The Royal Patiala reported that the movie was made with a star cast of Sarwar Ahuja (winner of ZeeCine Star ki Khoj), Madalsa Sharma, comedy king BN Sharma, versatile actor Sardar Sohi, Preeto Sawhney, Maninder Velly, Rana Jang Bahadar, Amita Nangia, Amritpal Billa Bhajji, Kuwinder Billa and many more. The movie's actors are mostly from Patiala as are the producers. The songs were recorded by Punjabi and Bollywood singers. The shooting of the movie has just finished, and inside news is that movie will be ready for release for upcoming holiday season near Diwali. According to the Calgary Herald, the Alberta-shot Bollywood film delayed by flooding is back on track.
