= Menstrual Man =

- Directed by: Amit Virmani
- Produced by: Kui Luan Seah; Amit Virmani
- Starring: Arunachalam Muruganantham
- Music by: G.Q. Fu
- Release date: April 2013
- Running time: 63 minutes
- Countries: India, Singapore

Menstrual Man is a 2013 documentary film by Amit Virmani. The film tells the story of Arunachalam Muruganantham, an Indian social entrepreneur and inventor whose machines enable rural women to manufacture low-cost sanitary pads for their communities. It premiered at the 2013 Full Frame Documentary Film Festival, and was voted a Top Ten Audience Favourite at both Hot Docs and IDFA the same year. The film was nominated for Best Feature Documentary at the Asia Pacific Screen Awards.

== Production ==
Virmani first read about Muruganantham in December 2011 and was instantly drawn to his story because "it played like a Bollywood movie". He contacted Muruganantham and began filming in January 2012 as he accompanied the inventor around India for the next five months. In June 2012, Virmani and his co-producer, Seah Kui Luan, secured funding from the Media Development Authority of Singapore to shoot reenactments and complete post-production on the film. Virmani also licensed footage from Bollywood films for use in the film.

== Reception ==
Menstrual Man received positive reviews. Writing in NOW, Canadian feminist author and activist Susan G. Cole noted the smart filmmaking behind the film, adding it "makes perfect sense by the end, when you've come to realize Muruganantham and the male educators he worked with are honorary feminists". John Lui from The Straits Times gave the film four-and-a-half stars, noting that the film avoids being "all po-faced liberal-guilt seriousness" with its use of vintage Bollywood clips and thanks to its charismatic protagonist. PBS POV columnist Tom Roston called the film his greatest discovery at the 2013 Hot Docs festival, describing the film as "an engaging, funny, heart-breaking story of the power of what one ordinary man can achieve". However, he felt that the title would discourage audiences from watching the film and that Virmani's refusal to change its title could inhibit the film's success. Virmani defended his decision, stating that people being ashamed to talk about menstruation was a big part of the problem of women's hygiene in rural India. "If I changed the title because educated people might not watch the film, then I'm a hypocrite. I become part of the problem."
