= Sapna Bedi =

Indian actress

- Other name: Swapna Bedi
- Occupation: Actress
- Years active: 1996–1997

Sapna Bedi is a former Indian actress, who worked in Hindi and Tamil-language films. She is best known for playing Jackie Shroff's fiancée in the 1997 blockbuster film Border.

== Career ==
She made her debut in the Tamil film Maanbumigu Maanavan (1996). Regarding her performance, a critic wrote, "Newcomer Swapna Bedi, a slightly taller version of Ahana with a mature look, carries out the instruction of the director". She then made her Hindi debut through the multi-starrer Border (1997) and played Jackie Shroff's fiancée. A critic noted that she "performed well". A few days after the film's release, her scenes were cut from the film due to its excessive length. Nonetheless, the film was a box office success and she was nominated for the Zee Cine Award for Best Female Debut alongside fellow actress Sharbani Mukherjee. She then appeared in Itihaas (1997) with a critic noting that her performance was "weak". The film was a box office failure and she subsequently retired from films.

== Filmography ==
Year	Film	Role	Language	Notes
1996	Maanbumigu Maanavan	Sneha	Tamil	
1997	Border	Roopali	Hindi	
1997	Itihaas	Anjali Sharma	Hindi	
