= Vipin Handa =

Indian television presenter

- Born: Delhi
- Education: Shri Ram College of Commerce
- Occupations: film producer, writer, lyricist
- Children: Jehan Handa
- Awards: Nominated For Best Directorial Debut; RAPA Award For Best Non-Fiction Show; Power Face on Television

Vipin Handa is an Indian film director producer, industrialist and television personality from New Delhi, India. He has been anchoring shows on Indian television and runs his men's fashion label, Villa Appearances.

== Biography ==
Handa was born and bred in Delhi. He did his schooling at the Delhi Public School and obtained his B.Com. (Hons) from the Shri Ram College of Commerce. Handa made his directorial debut with Uff Yeh Mohabbat starring debutants Abhishek Kapoor and Twinkle Khanna. Handa has also written lyrics for numerous movies with lyricist Rani Malik. Handa has been absent from the media for a long time, and was last seen on Dastak, a television show where he presented the problems of the unfortunate such as rape victims, child sex workers and those suffering from medical negligence and old age. Dastak offered a telephone number with counselors to provide support to callers. After Dastak went off air, Handa launched Koshish Foundation, which provided education to unemployed adolescent girls all over India.

Handa is currently writing a book for Wisdom Tree, with 14 short stories in English and Hindi. He is also the advisory member of the Wisdom Tree panel. He writes for a weekly newspaper section called "Vipin Handa Speaks" and also runs his men's fashion brand called Villa Appearances, which are branched all over India. Handa is currently planning to open a branch of boutique hotels with his son, Jehan Handa.

== Filmography ==
- 1996 Uff Yeh Mohabbat as Director

== Television appearances ==
Year	Title	Role	Other notes
1981	"Aapke Liye"	Host	
1981	"Inse Miliye"	Host	
1982	Aamne Saamne	Host	
1987	Baaton Baaton Mein	Host	
1990	Saptahiki	Host	
1992	Fursat Mein	Host	
1997	Box Office Speaks	Host	
1998	Koshish	Host	
1999	Black and White	Host	
2000	Dastak	Host	
2001	Subah Savere	Host	
2006	Vipin Handa Speaks	Host	
2007	Director's Special	Host	

== Awards ==
Year	Title	Role	Other notes
1996	Uff Yeh Mohabbat		Nominated for Best Directorial Debut
2001	Dastak		RAPA Award
1994	Baaton Baaton Mein		Best Talk Show
2007	AAFT Film Academy		Lifetime Achievement Award
