= Maanbumigu Maanavan =

- Film poster
- Directed by: S. A. Chandrasekhar
- Screenplay by: S. A. Chandrasekhar
- Story by: Shoba
- Produced by: Manickam Narayanan
- Starring: Vijay; Swapna Bedi
- Cinematography: R. Selva
- Edited by: Gautham Raju
- Music by: Deva
- Production company: Seventh Channel Communications
- Release date: 12 April 1996
- Running time: 150 minutes
- Country: India
- Language: Tamil

Maanbumigu Maanavan (transl. Respectable student) is a 1996 Indian Tamil-language action drama film and was directed by S. A. Chandrasekhar. The film stars Vijay and newcomber Swapna Bedi in the lead roles, while Chinni Jayanth, Manivannan, Vijayakumar, Mansoor Ali Khan and Shrinath play other supporting roles. Music was composed by Deva. Vijay had a completely different hair and beard style, and an image makeover in this film. This was the debut film for Bedi.

Maanbumigu Maanavan released on 12 April 1996. The songs were a big hit but the film ran no more than 50 days in theatres.

== Plot ==
Shivaraj alias Shiva is a college student who lives with his widowed mother and sister Kavitha. His friend Sundar is in love with their classmate Priya, but Priya's father, who is rich, opposes their relationship. Shiva helps Sundar and Priya elope. Meanwhile, Sneha, the daughter of ACP Chandrabose, falls in love with Shiva. Initially Shiva rebuffs Sneha, but he eventually reciprocates her feelings.

Madhan, the son of a powerful rowdy and politician Desigan, is a notorious womanizer who lusts for Priya. He rapes her in the college library and then kills her. Shiva, Sundar, and their friends decide to avenge her rape and death by their own brand of justice (killing Madhan), only to be stopped by Chandrabose, who prefers to arrest Madhan and let the court decide his punishment as he does not want Shiva to end up as a criminal. A cat-and-mouse game begins between Shiva and Chandrabose regarding Madhan's fate, which culminates with Chandrabose arresting Shiva with the aim of protecting him from Desigan and his men, who are planning to kill him, while Madhan is arrested as well.

Desigan hires a corrupt lawyer Killadi Krishnaswamy to fight Madhan's case in the court. Krishnaswamy, using crooked tactics, manages to acquit Madhan of the rape and murder charges. Meanwhile, Desigan kills Sundar as well as Shiva's mother. It is at this stage that Shiva and Chandrabose team up and plan to eliminate the trio (Madhan, Desigan and an unknown third person). Chandrabose hires Krishnaswamy to fight for Shiva in the court and acquit him of killing the three men, and then takes Shiva's place in jail. Shiva kills both Madhan and Desigan. At the court, Krishnaswamy manages to acquit Shiva by claiming that he is "mentally unstable", despite Shiva's pleas to the judge Ganapathy to convict him.

After the verdict, Shiva exposes the "third person" as none other than Krishnaswamy and kills him in front of Ganapathy for his corrupt activities. But he is sentenced to only six months imprisonment. Following his release, he reunites with Sneha and marries her.

== Cast ==
- Vijay as Shivaraj "Shiva"
- Swapna Bedi as Sneha
- Mansoor Ali Khan as Desigan
- Vijayakumar as ACP Chandrabose
- Manivannan as Killadi Krishnaswamy
- Jai Ganesh as Judge Ganapathy
- Chinni Jayanth as Kumar, Shiva's friend
- Kalyan as Madhan, Desigan's son
- Shruthi Raj as Priya
- Srinath as Sundar
- Jyothi Meena as Jayalakshmi
- Typist Gopu as inspector
- Ennatha Kannaiya as Chandrabose's servant
- S. Kavitha as Kavitha, Shiva's sister
- Chaplin Balu as Shiva's friend
- Ashok Raja as Shiva's friend
- Alphonsa (Special appearance)

== Production ==
Chandrasekhar initially wanted Devayani to pair with Vijay but she was replaced by a newcomer. Chandrasekhar slapped Chaplin Balu for a careless mistake committed by an assistant director in the shooting spot; this angered Vijay, who argued with his father.

== Soundtrack ==
The music was composed by Deva. The audio rights were acquired by Pyramid Audio and Rajshri Tamil.

Title	Lyrics	Singer(s)	Length
"Kodu Poda"	Kanmani Subbu	Suresh Peters	5:16
"Mathavaram"	Kanmani Subbu	Deva, S. N. Surendar, Krishnaraj	5:13
"Poori Poori"	Vaali	Mano, Swarnalatha	4:51
"Sooriyane"	Vaali	K. S. Chithra	4:12
"Thiruthani"	Vaali	Vijay	5:12
"December Mathathu"	Kanmani Subbu	S. N. Surendar, Suja Arun	5:15

== Reception ==
The Hindu wrote, "Shoba's story is of the usual variety. [..] Director S. A. Chandrasekharan's screenplay does the balancing task of providing entertainment fairly adequately highlighting the tussle between the hero Siva (Vijay) and the police deputy commissioner Chandrabose (Vijay Kumar) [...]".
