= Itihaas (1997 film) =

1997 Indian film by Raj Kanwar

- Poster
- Directed by: Raj Kanwar
- Written by: Kamlesh Pandey (dialogues)
- Screenplay by: Robin Bhatt; Akash Khurana
- Story by: Raj Kanwar
- Produced by: Raj Kanwar
- Starring: Ajay Devgn; Twinkle Khanna
- Cinematography: Harmeet Singh
- Edited by: A. Muthu
- Music by: Dilip Sen-Sameer Sen
- Release date: 20 June 1997
- Country: India
- Language: Hindi
- Budget: ₹5 crore (US$520,000)
- Box office: ₹10.88 crore (US$1.1 million)

Itihaas (transl. History) is a 1997 Indian Hindi language romantic action thriller film produced and directed by Raj Kanwar. The film stars Ajay Devgn and Twinkle Khanna as the lead protagonists, and Raj Babbar as the antagonist. Amrish Puri, Shakti Kapoor and Mohnish Bahl played supporting roles in the film. The film opened to negative reviews and failed to do well at the box office.

== Plot ==
Wealthy, powerful, and influential Thakur Digvijay Singh visits a village and falls in love with beautiful Naina . They are betrothed and are to be married soon. But Naina has fallen in love with the son, Karan, of Thakur's employee, Balwant. When Thakur finds out about this, he instructs his men to bring in Naina alive, and Karan dead. Karan and Naina run from this community all the way to Mumbai. The Thakur announces a hefty reward, and soon bounty hunters are all over Mumbai looking for the hapless couple. When Balwant hears about this, he too goes to Mumbai and does locate Karan and Naina. Karan is relieved to see his dad, but his relief soon turns to disbelief, as Balwant instructs him to let go of Naina, as he himself has come as an agent of the Thakur, not as his father.

== Cast ==
- Ajay Devgan as Karan Bakshi
- Twinkle Khanna as Naina Singh
- Amrish Puri as Balwant
- Raj Babbar as Thakur Digvijay Singh
- Shakti Kapoor as Navlakhi / Dholu
- Sapna Bedi as Anjali Sharma
- Aruna Irani as Rukmani
- Mohnish Behl as Inspector Ujagar Pandey
- Neelima Azeem as Naveli
- Kanchan as Ganga

== Production ==
Itihaas was the first attempt of Kanwar at producing a film and was highly publicised. He repeated the pairing of Devgn and Khanna who had previously starred in his 1996 film Jaan. Outlook noted that the film had been "lavishly produced". Xavier Marquis also helped in the film's finances.

== Soundtrack ==
Music by Dilip Sen-Sameer Sen.

All lyrics are written by Sameer Anjaan.

No.	Title	Singer(s)	Length
1.	"Chori Chori Dil Diya"	Kumar Sanu, Alka Yagnik
2.	"Dil Ke Qalam Se"	Hariharan, Anuradha Paudwal
3.	"Dil Ke Qalam Se" (film version)"	Hariharan, Alka Yagnik
4.	"Achko Machko"	Alka Yagnik
5.	"Bol Bol Bol Raja"	Vinod Rathod, Shankar Mahadevan, Alka Yagnik
6.	"Ja Re Ja Ud Ja Panchhi"	Shankar Mahadevan, Alka Yagnik
7.	"Yeh Ishq Bada"	Pappu A K, Anuradha Paudwal
8.	"Saathi Mere Tere Bina"	Kumar Sanu, Anuradha Paudwal
9.	"Yeh Ishq Bada" (version 2)"	Pappu A K, Alka Yagnik
10.	"Juda Apne Dilbar Se"	Alka Yagnik, Shankar Mahadevan, Sukhwinder Singh

The audio cassette of the film was released at the Sun & Sand Hotel in Juhu.

== Reception ==
Supran Verma of Rediff.com wrote that the film had "turned to be just a rehash of [Jaan] and other Kanwar films" which was why maybe it didn’t catch the audience’s attention.

The film performed poorly at the box office, becoming the first flop of Raj Kanwar. Devgn took the Bombay territory as fees.
