= Phullu =

- Theatrical release poster
- Directed by: Abhishek Saxena
- Produced by: Pushpa Chaudhary; Dr. Anmol Kapoor; Kshitij Chaudhary; Raman Kapoor
- Starring: Sharib Hashmi; Jyotii Sethi; Nutan Surya
- Music by: Vickky Agarwal & Troy Arif
- Production company: Kapoor Film Inc Kc Production Pvt.Ltd
- Distributed by: Kapoor Film Inc Kc Production Pvt.Ltd
- Release date: 16 June 2017
- Country: India
- Language: Hindi

Phullu is a 2017 Indian drama film directed by Abhishek Saxena. Produced by Pushpa Chaudhary, Dr. Anmol Kapoor, Kshitij Chaudhary, and Raman Kapoor under the Kapoor Film Inc Kc Production Pvt. Ltd banner. The film was released worldwide on June 16, 2017. The film stars Sharib Hashmi, Jyotii Sethi, Nutan Surya, and is inspired by the life of Arunachalam Muruganantham, a social activist from Tamil Nadu.

Phullu is about Phullu, an errand boy who eventually makes low-cost menstruation pads.

== Plot ==
Phullu is an unemployed man who lives with his mother and sister in a tiny village devoid of basic amenities and infrastructure. He primarily gets pieces of waste cloth from tailors in a nearby city and he and his mother recycles it into refurbished quilts. His mother then makes a very meager income by selling those quilts door to door. His sister also helps the family in domestic chores. Given his kind nature, he also brings the things from the city which the women of the village require. Phullu’s mother constantly tries to persuade him to move to Delhi where he could find some better paying job.

Thinking that his son would move to a bigger city to earn a better salary, Phullu’s mother gets him married, assuming he would listen to his wife about moving out. Phullu is instantly attracted to a woman chosen by his mother, Bigni, and the two got married. Phullu starts keeping Bigni as his top priority over his mother and sister.

Once, while visiting the city to collect golden earrings for his sister, he also visits a chemist store to buy sanitary napkins, which his wife had requested for. Though, Phullu has no idea what those napkins are. He is told by a doctor in the store that instead of a cloth, women should use sanitary napkins to contain any possible infections. Phullu is stunned to learn that and instead of buying the earrings, he invests all the money in purchasing pads for all the females in his family. However, his mother and sister got furious at him for dwindling all the savings on pads instead of gold.

Phullu constantly seeks advice from a local female school teacher about sanitary napkins and realizes that menstrual pads are very costly for poor women to afford. In order to find a solution to this problem, he moves to the city. He ends up finding a job at a sanitary napkin manufacturing company with the assistance of a local journalist. At the firm, he closely observes every step that goes behind the production of the pads. He quits his job and comes back to his village. Meanwhile, he visits his wife, who is no now seven months pregnant.

He experiments with making sanitary pads on his own by using the expertise that he gained from his previous employer. He intends to offer the pads at a nominal price. After struggling a lot, he finally manages to make a prototype of the pad. However, no woman in his village wants to try out his product and he is severely criticized for his act. He comes up with an innovative idea and made a mannequin. He puts his own blood in the pubic region of the mannequin and covers it with his sanitary napkin. He waits for the next day to see the results of his experiment.

As he woke up the next morning, he found out that his wife died due to a vaginal infection but at the same time, he also figures out that his experiment with the mannequin has been successful. He got featured in the top story of the newspaper for his achievement by the journalist who helped him with the job in the city.

== Cast ==
- Sharib Ali Hashmi as Phullu
- Nutan Suriya as "Amma" (Phullu's mother)
- Jyoti Sethi as Bigni
- Trisha Kale as Tara
- Kimti Anand as Heera Chacha
- Namya Saxena as Chitra
- Paras Raj Gandhi as Pramod
- Seema Parihar as Vimla
- Nilanjana Banerjee as Shobha

== See also ==
- Pad Man
- Period. End of Sentence.
