= Pyjamas Are Forgiving =

2018 novel by Twinkle Khanna

- First edition
- Author: Twinkle Khanna
- Language: English
- Genre: Fiction
- Published: Juggernaut Books (September 2018)
- Publication place: India
- Pages: 256
- ISBN: 9386228971

Pyjamas Are Forgiving is a 2018 novel written by Twinkle Khanna and published by Juggernaut Books on 7 September 2018. The novel is narrated by Anshu, a middle-aged woman who is suffering from sleep disorder. The story traces her 28 days spent in a spa in Kerala and her meeting with her former husband. Khanna has said that the novel's title came to her as she struggled to zip up her jeans after a few weeks of Diwali.

== Reception ==
Nayare Ali of the Asian Age said that "Twinkle Khanna’s books resonate with her readers, because she has this wonderful knack of tying up the loose ends and ensuring that her characters find salvation at the end of the book’s journey." "What could have been a story about an embittered woman, jilted by her dissolute husband, turns into a romp, thanks to Khanna’s gift for observing the absurdities of life", states Mint Lounge. Ishita Sengupta of The Indian Express said that the protagonist is "in many ways, reads like a literary counterpart of the author herself." She however felt that the narrative "bereft of Khanna’s characteristic spark and is as dry as the apricot you find hard to bite on in the morning." "I could easily see Pyjamas being adapted for the stage, too. The confined setting, a wisecracking lead wreathed in sadness, a supporting cast of gays, gurus, millennials and reprobates, each repping a social hot topic — feminism, communalism, LGBTQ rights, the #MeToo movement. And some illicit sex for good measure", says Cheryl-Ann Couto of The Hindu. A review carried by News18 called the plot "paper-thin" and the characters as "lacklustre". Kaveree Bamzai of Daily O writes, "If there was ever a book about women, here and now, then it is this, Twinkle Khanna's first novel and third book, Pyjamas Are Forgiving(Juggernaut). It's not merely because it is tart and juicy, like everything else she writes, but also because it has a depth of understanding about the way we are which is revelatory." Urvashi Bahuguna of The Scroll states that "Khanna pushes the boundaries of what’s allowed in funny, accessible literature. She’s able to work constipation and sex into humour that doesn’t feel derivate or exploitative. She isn’t swinging for happy endings or romantic resolutions. Instead, she opts for a hybrid read that will appeal to different stripes of readers." Published by Juggernaut Books, it was No 1 on Nielsen BookScan’s India list for three weeks from its debut.
