= Bandaa Singh Chaudhary =

- Official release poster
- Directed by: Abhishek Saxena
- Written by: Abhishek Saxena; Shaheen Iqbal
- Produced by: Arbaaz Khan; Manish Mishra
- Starring: Arshad Warsi; Meher Vij
- Cinematography: Simarjit Singh Suman
- Edited by: Sanjay Sankla
- Music by: Rahul Jain, Anand Bhaskar
- Production company: Arbaaz Khan Production
- Distributed by: Aks Movies & Entertainment; Cinekorn Entertainment
- Release date: 25 October 2024
- Running time: 166 minutes
- Country: India
- Language: Hindi

Bandaa Singh Chaudhary is a 2024 Indian Hindi-language action drama film directed by Abhishek Saxena and produced by Arbaaz Khan. Starring Arshad Warsi and Meher Vij, the film is set around Punjab in 1984 where a man fights with militants for survival.

== Plot ==
The story of a family man Bandaa who risked for his life for his family by protecting them from militants.

== Cast ==
- Arshad Warsi as Bandaa Singh Chaudhary
- Meher Vij as Bandaa's wife
- Sachin Negi as Harpal
- Alisha Chopra as Meher
- Jeeveshu Ahluwalia as Tejinder
- Shilpi Marwaha

== Reception ==
Shubhra Gupta of The Indian Express gave 1.5 stars out of 5 and saif that "Arshad Warsi is such a pleasing performer that he manages to lift even the worst things he is in. Playing a central character usually gives a good actor something to do. Not here." Rishabh Suri of Hindustan Times said that "Arshad Warsi's misguided film on the insurgency in Punjab ends up being tone deaf." Devesh Sharma of Filmfare rated this 2.5/5 stars and said that "Bandaa Singh Chaudhary is a melodramatic film around Punjab’s militancy problem in the ’80s and how it’s still relevant today." Ganesh Aaglave of the Firstpost gave 3 stars and praised the film and saying that "Bandaa Singh Chaudhary deserves appreciation for narrating the untold part of history" Dhaval Roy of The Times of India gave 2.5 stars out of 5 and observed that "With a deeper exploration of the socio-political scenario and tighter narrative, 'Bandaa Singh Chaudhary' would have been a standout film. Instead, it doesn't reach its potential and leaves much to be desired." Simran Singh of DNA gave 3 stars and said that "Overall, Bandaa Singh Chaudhary is a film that doesn't show Punjab and Sikhs in bad light, but it claims to project a phase where extremists, disguised as Sikhs, misguided the youth. Despite being predictable, Bandaa Singh Chaudhary shines and packs a punch." Mayur Sanap of rediff.com gave 1.5 stars and criticized the film by saying that "Bandaa Singh Chaudhary compromises on its hard realism to go after an easily digestible, mass entertainer that undoes everything that the film had set out to say".

== Soundtrack ==
The music of the film is composed by Rahul Jain, Anand Bhaskar. The first single titled "Enna Sona" was released on 5 Oct 2024. The second single titled "Sun Bandeya" was released on 11 Oct 2024. The third single titled "Dil Mureeda" was released on 16 Oct 2024.

Track listing
No.	Title	Lyrics	Music	Singer(s)	Length
1.	"Enna Sona"	Jax53	Rahul Jain	Jubin Nautiyal, Rahul Jain	3:31
2.	"Sun Bandeya"	Shaheen Iqbal	Anand Bhaskar	Sukhwinder Singh, Anand Bhaskar	4:47
3.	"Dil Mureeda"	Kunaal Vermaa	Rahul Jain	Sunidhi Chauhan, Jay Mishra, Rahul Jain	5:08
4.	"Meher"	Kunaal Vermaa	Rahul Jain	Sukhbir, Asees Kaur, Sahil Solanki, Rahul Jain, Aryam	3:58
5.	"Shabash Jawaana"	Kunaal Vermaa	Rahul Jain	B Praak, Rahul Jain	4:08
6.	"Dil Mureeda" (Unplugged)	Kunaal Vermaa	Rahul Jain	Sunidhi Chauhan, Rahul Jain	5:24
7.	"Enna Sona" (Unplugged)	Jax53	Rahul Jain	Jay Mishra, Rahul Jain	3:12
8.	"Shabash Jawaana" (Reloaded)	Kunaal Vermaa	Rahul Jain	Rahul Jain	4:03
9.	"Enna Sona" (Reprise)	Jax53	Rahul Jain	Rahul Jain	3:31
10.	"Sun Bandeya" (Unplugged)	Shaheen Iqbal	Anand Bhaskar	Anand Bhaskar, Shilpa Surroch	5:24
Total length:					43:17
