= Mrs Funnybones =

2015 book by Twinkle Khanna

- First edition
- Author: Twinkle Khanna
- Language: English
- Published: Penguin India (August 2015)
- Publication place: India
- Pages: 248 pp.
- ISBN: 9780143424468
- OCLC: 919186937

Mrs Funnybones: She’s Just Like You and a Lot Like Me is a 2015 Indian non-fiction book written by former film actress Twinkle Khanna and published by Penguin India. Mrs Funnybones sold over one lakh copies making Khanna the highest-selling Indian female writer of 2015.

== Background ==
Khanna is a columnist for The Times of India and Daily News and Analysis. Her husband helped her with editing drafts for the book.

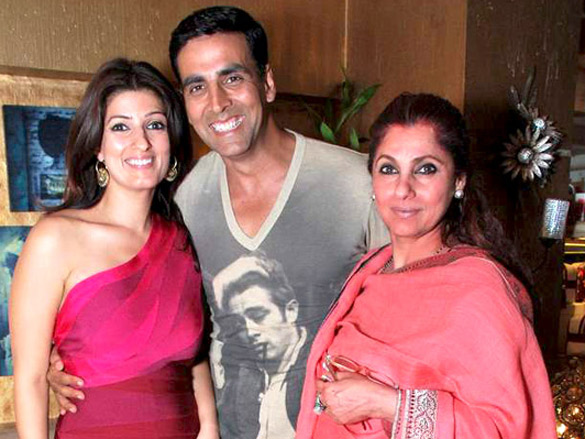
Khanna with her husband, Akshay Kumar (centre) and mother, Dimple Kapadia (right), who feature in the book

Khanna said that the main characters in the book are "a few facts, a little fiction, a few decaying brain cells, and a couple of old bones into my brewing cauldron of words." The book received good reviews with The Times of India stating "The funny bone definitely tickles but at the same time also jabs you hard." "Subtle observation(s) with a sledgehammer impact." says Mint. The Huffington Post reviewed the book stating "Thank you Mrs. Funnybones for reminding us that life is what you make of it and the most ordinary moments sometimes provide the maximum entertainment and pearls of wisdom." The book highlights anecdotes and the experiences of the author regarding her family, surroundings and the way she handles them. In the whole book, Khanna did not mention her husband by his name.

The book was launched in Mumbai on 18 August 2015 before Dimple Kapadia, Akshay Kumar, Aamir Khan, Karan Johar, Jaya Bachchan and Sonali Bendre. The book has received critical acclaim particularly for its humour. Megha of The Free Press Journal wrote "...[Although] this book is delight to read, it at times gets a little repetitive with the inclusion of some of her columns that have appeared in newspapers." Author and screenwriter Advaita Kala called it; "...endearing, real and well written". It was ranked in Hindustan Times's Best non-fiction books chart.
