= Missing on a Weekend =

- Directed by: Abhishek Jawkar
- Written by: Abhishek Jawkar
- Produced by: Rajesh Patange; Sebastian Joseph; Abhishek Jawkar
- Edited by: Abhishek Jawkar
- Music by: Nakash Aziz, Om Jha, Superbia
- Production companies: The Red Bulb Studios & Adept Films
- Release date: 26 August 2016
- Country: India
- Language: Hindi

Missing on a Weekend is an Indian investigating thriller film directed by Abhishek Jawkar and produced by Rajesh Patange, Sebastian Joseph and Abhishek Jawkar.

== Premise ==
Missing on a Weekend is an investigating crime story based in Goa. Police Inspector Ali Ansari (Pavan Malhotra) from CBI has been transferred to Goa to take charge of the current ugly undercover crime space which has troubled the tourism capital of India.

Ansari has now got a new case in the midst of all the chaos, where one guy, Laksh (Karan Hariharan) has been found unconscious on Calangute beach. He is brutally hurt on his head and has lost a substantial part of his memory. After the brief investigation, police get to know his whereabouts in Goa. As the police team reaches the resort where Laksh and his six other friends from Delhi are staying, they found one of his friend dead in one toilet of a cottage and all other friends are missing.

Now, Ansari is left with only one suspect-cum-victim-cum survivor, Laksh, who hardly remembers anything that has happened.

== Release Date ==
'Missing On A Weekend' was supposed to hit screens on 1 July, but issues from the censors and Goa Tourism (PR) kept a hold on the release.

CBFC asks for 50 cuts in Missing On A Weekend

‘Missing on a Weekend’ gets release date after censor trouble. The film was finally released on 26 August 2016.

== Cast ==
- Karan Hariharan as Laksh Kumar
- Pavan Malhotra as Inspector Ali Ansari
- Jyotii Sethi as Reeha Banerjee
- Dishank Arora as Sub Inspector Ajay Kondse
- Mahsa Kooshesh as Tanisha Sehgal
- Shiva Dagar as Rishab Singh
- Akash Bathija as Prince Chawla
- Siddhant Mahajan as Himanshu Malik
- Khushboo Kamal as Smriti Yadav
- Nikhil Punamiya as news reporter
- Dibyendu Bhattacharya in a special appearance as Mukhtaar
- Madan Maruti Gadekar as Alvin Lobo
- Charul Bawsar as Shama, Ali's wife
- Akshay Raj as drug peddler
- Ashish Warang as Police Commissioner
- Marina Stankovic as foreigner
- Maryam Zakaria as dancer (Bairi song)
- Chandni Sharma as dancer (Parda Hata song)
- Abhinav Sharma as bar-tender
- Sanjeev Dhuri as doctor
- Omesh Bolke as fisherman
