= The Legend of Lakshmi Prasad =

2016 book by Twinkle Khanna

First edition (publ. Juggernaut Books)

The Legend of Lakshmi Prasad is a collection of four stories on feminism written by the Indian newspaper columnist, film producer, film actress and interior designer Twinkle Khanna. The book was published on 7 November 2016 by Juggernaut Books. It contains four stories: "The Legend of Lakshmi Prasad", "Salam, Noni Appa", "If the Weather Permits", and "The Sanitary Man of Sacred Land".

== Plot ==
Story one is “The Legend of Lakshmi Prasad” which speaks about a girl who changes her village with her idea. The story speaks about society’s view on young girls.

Story two is “Salam, Noni Appa”. It is about relationships and finding love in old age. It speaks the wish of a person's heart is more important than the society's.

Story three “If the weather permits” is about women’s marriage. The story clearly states marry a woman only she is of perfect age irrespective of her wish or the society.

Story four “The Sanitary Man of Sacred Land” is about a man who produces sanitary napkins at a low cost. It is based on the true story of Tamil Nadu activist Arunachalam Muruganantham. In 2018, it has been made into a movie, Pad Man, directed by R. Balki and starring Akshay Kumar, telling how the sanitary man makes sanitary pads for his wife and solved the whole village menstrual problems at low cost.

== Launch ==
The book was launched by Twinkle Khanna and her friend Karan Johar in an event hosted by themselves. Twinkle Khanna explained that her book is about feminism and the taboos of society. Twinkle Khanna said in an interview “I would say: People are reading many many bad books in large numbers, so read my book because it’s good!"

== Reception ==
The Times of India's reviewer opined that "the book is a neat slice of life and we shall savour it till the end". Hindustan Times took notice of the "sensitive, humorous and eminently readable stories". Critic from The Hindu remarked that the book was "sprinkled with fine wit and represent great cultural commentary." It reached second place in Amazon's pre-release list and several filmmakers contacted her to gain its film rights.

Khanna won the India Today Woman Writer of the Year 2017 and Bangalore Literature Festival—Popular Choice Award for this book. The collection sold more than 100,000 copies within the first year of its release. The Salaam Noni Appa story was adapted into a play with Lillete Dubey in the lead and The Sanitary Man of Sacred Land led to a film Pad Man, in which Khanna's husband Akshay Kumar plays the role of Arunachalam Muruganantham.
