= Abhishek Saxena =

Indian film director (born 1988)

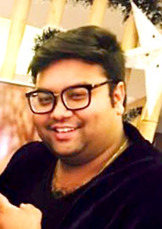
- Abhishek Saxena
- Born: 19 September 1988 (age 37); Delhi, India
- Education: Graduation - Delhi University (2009)
- Occupation: Film director
- Known for: Phullu, Patiala Dreamz

Abhishek Saxena is an Indian Bollywood and Punjabi film director who directed the movie Phullu. The Phullu movie was released in theaters on 16 June 2017, in which film Sharib Hashmi is the lead role. Apart from these, he has also directed Patiala Dreamz, this is a Punjabi film. This film was screened in cinemas in 2014.

== Life and background ==
Abhishek Saxena was born on 19 September 1988 in the capital of India, Delhi, whose father's name is Mukesh Kumar Saxena. Abhishek Saxena married Ambica Sharma Saxena on 18 December 2014. His mother's name is Gurpreet Kaur Saxena.

Saxena started his career with a Punjabi film Patiala Dreamz, after which he has also directed a Hindi film Phullu, which has appeared in Indian cinemas on 16 June 2017.

== Career ==
Abhishek Saxena made his film debut in 2011 as an assistant director on Doordarshan with Ashok Gaikwad. He made his first directed film Patiala Dreamz, this is a Punjabi movie.

After this, he has also directed a Hindi film Phullu in 2017, which has been screened in cinemas on 16 June 2017. Saxena is now making his upcoming movie "India Gate".

In 2018 Abhishek Saxena has come up with topic of body-shaming in his upcoming movie Saroj ka Rishta. Where Sanah Kapoor will play the role of Saroj and actors Randeep Rai and Gaurav Pandey will play the two men in Saroj's life.Yeh Un Dinon ki Baat Hai lead Randeep Rai will make his Bollywood debut. Talking about the film, director Abhishek Saxena told Mumbai Mirror, "As a fat person, I have noticed that body-shaming doesn’t happen only with those who are on the heavier side, but also with thin people. The idea germinated from there."

Career as an Assistant Director

Apart from this, he has played the role of assistant director in many films and serials in the beginning of his career, in which he has a television serial in 2011, Doordarshan, as well as in 2011, he also assisted in a serial of Star Plus.

In addition to these serials, he played the role of assistant director in the movie "Girgit" which was made in Telugu language.

== Filmography ==
As Director

Year	Film	Notes
2024	Bandaa Singh Chaudhary	
2022	Saroj Ka Rishta	
2017	Phullu	
2014	Patiala Dreamz	
