= Dil Tera Diwana (1996 film) =

- Film poster
- Directed by: Lawrence D'Souza
- Written by: Nawab Arzoo (dialogue and screenplay); Raj Baldev Raj (Dialogue); S. Khan (story)
- Produced by: Pahlaj Nihalani
- Starring: Saif Ali Khan; Twinkle Khanna
- Cinematography: Lawrence D'Souza
- Edited by: R. Rajendran
- Music by: Aadesh Shrivastava
- Production company: Chiragdeep International
- Release date: 9 August 1996
- Running time: 150 min.
- Country: India
- Language: Hindi
- Budget: ₹3.00 crore (US$350,000)
- Box office: ₹6.15 crore (US$730,000) (approx)

Dil Tera Diwana is a 1996 Indian Hindi-language romantic thriller film directed by Lawrence D'Souza, produced by Pahlaj Nihalani and written by Nawab Arzoo, Raj Baldev Raj and S.Khan.

It stars Saif Ali Khan and Twinkle Khanna. The film and the lead actors' names had been announced as early as September, 1994. Nihalani cast the lead actors hoping that their pairing will have the same result as their actor parents Rajesh Khanna and Sharmila Tagore's pair. India Today labelled the film "racy musical love story" and a "B grade flick". Despite high expectations, the film turned out to be a commercial failure.

== Plot ==
Kumar is the proud widowed businessman, the father of Ravi (Saif Ali Khan), his only son, his pride and joy. When Ravi grows up, he meets Komal in college and instantly falls in love with her. Ravi mentions this to his dad, who approves the alliance. But due to Ravi's bad habit of bothering many female schoolmates, Komal instantly dislikes him. So along with the idea of his friends, Ravi changes his name to Bharat Kaushal and pretends to be poor and good to get his love from Komal. This later confuses Komal, when she befriends Bharat and sees "him" and "Ravi" to resemble each other physically. But she then believes they're two different guys. This secret is unknown to Mr. Kumar, who later finds out from Ravi about his double appearances on his birthday when the police accuses Ravi as Bharat, Ravi's look-alike who disguised himself as Ravi after killing him in greed of wealth.

Ravi refuses saying he hasn't killed anyone, but everyone agrees with the police including Komal who now hates him as Bharat and Mr. Kumar, whose mission is now to take revenge of Bharat by killing him with his own hands. His friend Satyajit "Satya" also lies accusing Ravi as Bharat, which ends their friendship. Ravi is arrested and he attempts many evidences to prove that he's innocent and is Ravi, which still nobody believes. Meanwhile, along with Komal's dad, Alok, Mr. Kumar's men capture Bharat and bring him to him where he tells him his personal secret that he and Alok are kings of the underworld. As Mr. Kumar's men are asked to capture Bharat since he escaped from Mr. Kumar killing him, Ravi kidnaps Komal from her house in front of Alok. He takes her to his slum where his dying landlord gets shot by Kumar and Alok's enemy, a criminal named Ambani, whose men hunting Bharat reveal the truth to Komal that Ravi is Bharat, which Komal finally believes, and regrets mistaking him for the crime the police accused him of and she and Ravi fall in love.

Then they start to spend their time together and love extends more. Komal is then later brought home to her dad by the police, where she insists Bharat is Ravi, but this angers Alok who locks her in her room and insists that she not meet him. Ambani later kills Satya after Ravi confronts him for lying to the police about his double role on his birthday. It's later revealed that Ambani took advantage of Ravi's double role, so he falsely accused to the police about Ravi and killed his friend Salim, whose corpse was disguised as Ravi, because of the clothes and the watch Ravi gave him, which was originally given to him by his dad. He also used Ravi's friends including Satya to make them lie about Ravi, but their friend Vicky refused in favour of Ravi, for which Ambani kills him in front of them. He tells Ravi this, whom his men have captured, then Ravi kills Ambani and his men along with Mr. Kumar, who apologizes and believes Ravi as his son, in which Alok is killed too after confessing he is the main mastermind behind all the hassle because he wanted to take revenge for his brother's death. Mr. Kumar is then shot by one of Ambani's men and a few moments before his death, tells the police, who arrive on the scene, that Ravi is his son and he's innocent, which they also finally believe and he gives Komal's hand in marriage to Ravi.

== Cast ==
- Saif Ali Khan as Ravi Kumar/Bharat Kaushal
- Twinkle Khanna as Komal
- Shatrughan Sinha as Mr. Kumar
- Dalip Tahil as Alok
- Shakti Kapoor as Ambani
- Harish Patel as Laxminarayan
- Reema Lagoo as Mr. Kumar's late wife and Ravi's late mother
- Guddi Maruti as Momo
- Ishrat Ali as Police Inspector Khan
- Raju Shrestha as Satyajit
- Vishwajeet Pradhan as Pasha
- Tiku Talsania as College Principal
- Arun Bakshi as Tatto Artist Chacha
- Dinesh Hingoo as Boys Hostel Warden

== Soundtrack ==
Dil Tera Deewana is a Hindi album released on 20 Jun 1996. This album is composed by Aadesh Shrivastava. Dil Tera Deewana Album has 7 songs sung by Udit Narayan, Kavita Krishnamurthy, Kumar Sanu. Most popular songs in album "Banke Mohabbat Tum To Base Ho".

#	Title	Singer(s)
1	"Din Dhal Gaya Hai Abto Jane Do Yaar"	Udit Narayan, Alka Yagnik
2	"Aap Se Hoke Juda Hum Kidhar Jayenge"	Udit Narayan, Kavita Krishnamurthy
3	"Gusse Se Aur Khilti Ho"	Abhijeet, Alka Yagnik
4	"Ye Gore Gore Gaal"	Udit Narayan
5	"Dil Pe Lahoo Se Likh Diya"	Kumar Sanu, Alka Yagnik
6	"Banke Mohabbat Tum To Base Ho"	Kumar Sanu, Alka Yagnik
7	"Ruby Ruby Ruby"	Udit Narayan, Aditya Narayan

A review in Rashtriya Sahara found the lyrics by Shyam Raj and Lubna Khan "not very inspiring". "Aap Se Hoke Juda Hum Kidhar Jayenge" and "Banke Mohabbat Tum To Base Ho" were labelled "better than average" while "Ye Gore Gore Gaal" was called "boringly average".
