= Pad Man (film) =

2018 film directed by R. Balki

- Theatrical release poster
- Directed by: R. Balki
- Written by: R. Balki; Swanand Kirkire
- Based on: The Legend of Lakshmi Prasad by Twinkle Khanna
- Produced by: Twinkle Khanna Prerna Arora
- Starring: Akshay Kumar; Sonam Kapoor; Radhika Apte
- Cinematography: P. C. Sreeram
- Edited by: Chandan Arora
- Music by: Amit Trivedi
- Production companies: Mrs Funny Bones Movies; Columbia Pictures; SPE Films India; KriArj Entertainment; Cape of Good Films; Hope Productions
- Distributed by: Sony Pictures Releasing
- Release date: February 9, 2018
- Running time: 140 minutes
- Countries: India; United States
- Language: Hindi
- Budget: 85 crore
- Box office: ₹207.73 crore

Pad Man is a 2018 Hindi-language social comedy-drama film written and directed by R. Balki. A co-production between India and the United States, it stars Akshay Kumar, Sonam Kapoor Ahuja, and Radhika Apte in the lead roles with an ensemble supporting cast. The film is based on the life of Arunachalam Muruganantham, a social activist and entrepreneur from Coimbatore, Tamil Nadu who made low-cost sanitary pads for women in rural areas. His journey was chronicled by Twinkle Khanna in her fictional story The Legend of Lakshmi Prasad.

The idea to adapt Murugan's life began in 2015 when Khanna, who served as a co-producer on the film, came across his story while doing a research for a column in The Times of India. Inspired and moved by his persistence and determination, she wrote about him in her book, The Legend of Lakshmi Prasad (2016). In November 2017, Sony Pictures became the global distributor for the film. Principal photography commenced on 14 March. The majority of the film was shot in the small town of Maheshwar beside the Narmada River in Madhya Pradesh. After filming ended in India, the team travelled to New York City where pivotal scenes were filmed at the Times Square and Lincoln Center, as well as at the United Nations headquarters. Muruganantham worked closely with R. Balki, Kumar and Khanna on set in India, making sure every detail was accurate from the way he built his machine, to how to operate it, even his own posture.

Pad Man was initially scheduled to open in cinemas on 25 January 2018, during Republic Day. The film was ultimately released theatrically in India on 9 February 2018, thus becoming the first Hindi film to premiere at the Russia box office on its original date. Upon release, it was a critical and commercial success and performed well especially in India and China, with a worldwide gross of ₹207.73 crore. It won the National Film Award for Best Film on Other Social Issues. At the 64th Filmfare Awards, Kumar received a nomination for Best Actor for his performance, only nomination for the film.

== Plot ==
The story starts with the marriage of Lakshmikant "Lakshmi" Chauhan and Gayatri. Lakshmi is deeply in love with his wife and will do anything for her comfort and happiness. When Gayatri is temporarily banished from the household during her menstrual periods, Lakshmi is caught unaware due to his lack of knowledge about the subject. He became worried after seeing Gayatri use an unhygienic rag during her periods. Gayatri tells him he should not interfere in this feminine topic. Undeterred, Laxmi buys sanitary pads for his wife, which are rather costly. Gayatri tells him to return it, as using such costly napkins means cutting off milk expenses. Crestfallen, Laxmi goes to work, where a worker gets injured. He immediately applies a pad to the injury, despite the others referring to it as "impure". The doctor lauds Laxmi's quick thinking and says that it is the cleanest choice to stop the bleeding. Excited, Laxmi buys some cotton, cloth, and glue and makes a temporary pad, which he thinks is a better replacement for the costly one.

Gayatri uses it but the pad fails in its function and she tells Laxmi to not interfere in women's matters again. Laxmi again tries to make a pad, and gives it to a female medical student, who decides to help him out but is deterred by her friends. To add to his woes, his meeting with the student makes his wife think that he is having an affair. Laxmi tries to give his sister pads, which leads to embarrassment in front of her in-laws. Next, he tries it on himself by attaching a balloon filled with goat blood, which leads to him getting blood all over his trousers in public, resulting in humiliation. This act causes him to be branded "a man with loose morals" by the entire village. Gayatri's brothers take her away and Laxmi decides to leave, pledging to fight the taboo surrounding menstruation.

After learning that sanitary pads use the more absorbent cellulose fibre rather than cotton, Laxmi goes to a college to gain knowledge about the materials used in sanitary napkins. In need of money and shelter, he works as a manservant in a professor's house. The professor's son introduces him to the Internet and helps him get information. The professor is baffled by Laxmi's actions and shows him videos of pad-making machines worth millions to derail his ideas. It has the opposite effect: Laxmi is inspired by this to make his own pad-making machine. He borrows money and manages to make a good pad but has no one to test it. He ends up meeting Pari Walia, an MBA student at Faculty of Management Studies – University of Delhi, and supplies a pad to her. When he asks for feedback, she says that it's like a normal pad. Laxmi's joy knows no bounds and he calls Gayatri to give her the news. Gayatri gets upset at his obsession with menstruation, and her brother warns him to stay away.

Pari sees Laxmi's potential and invites him to an innovation fair in Delhi. Laxmi's invention is recognized as the "Life-Changing Innovation of the Year" and he shoots to fame but the villagers, on realizing the nature of his invention, insult him. Pari turns down her campus placement and helps a dejected Laxmi sell his pads to rural women, who later join him in his venture. Laxmi and Pari travel from village to village, making low-cost pad-manufacturing machines, creating small pad-making factories, and providing rural women both jobs and pads for sale. He is invited to New York and gives a speech at the United Nations. Back home, he is awarded the Padma Shri. Pari falls in love with him, which makes Laxmi conflicted as he has feelings for her too. However, she steps back for his happiness, with Laxmi telling her she helped make him a new man. Laxmi returns to a hero's welcome in his village. The film ends with Laxmi and Gayatri finally reuniting, and Laxmi finding continued success with his endeavors.

== Cast ==
- Akshay Kumar as Lakshmikant Chauhan aka Pad Man, who is based on entrepreneur Arunachalam Muruganantham
- Sonam Kapoor as Pari Walia
- Radhika Apte as Gayatri Chauhan, based on Shanthi Muruganantham
- Jyoti Subhash as Subhadra Chauhan
- Mrinmayee Godbole as Sonali Chauhan
- Parul Chouhan as Jyoti Chauhan
- Soumya Vyas as Aabha Chauhan
- Yogesh Shreekant Pandey as Babloo Rajput
- A. R. Rama as Hariya Rajvansh
- Himika Bose as Sonali Kumari
- Mrudul Satam as Tinku Varma
- Riva Bubber as Asha Varma
- Rakesh Chaturvedi as Professor Sanjeev Sharma
- Wahib Kapadia as Manas Sharma
- Rajesh Tiwari as Moneylender
- Urmila Mahanta as Savitri Modi
- Suneel Sinha as Professor Tejas Walia
- Amitabh Bachchan in a cameo appearance as himself and a narrator in a trailer

== Production ==
=== Development ===
I didn't want to make a documentary, I wanted to make a commercial film so people can see it. It's a film you can take your children to, even though it talks about sanitary pads. It's a universal subject. Nobody has ever tried to touch this subject.

— Akshay Kumar

The film is based on the life of Arunachalam Muruganantham, a Tamil Nadu-based social activist who revolutionized the concept of menstrual hygiene in rural India by creating a low-cost sanitary napkin machine. Pad Man was envisioned to be an awareness film without focusing on commercial aspects. The producers' main agenda was to reach out to a wide audience to create awareness and eradicate prevalent superstitions in India surrounding sanitary pads. As with Kumar's previous film, Toilet: Ek Prem Katha, he hoped to educate the masses, both women and men, about menstrual hygiene and to stop labelling it as stigma or taboo in society. Furthermore, it was a plea towards politicians to drive their attention towards sanitary pads and making it mandatory across institutions.

The idea to adapt Murugan's life began in 2015 when Twinkle Khanna came across his story while doing a research for a column in The Times of India. Inspired and moved by his persistence and determination, she wrote about him in her book, The Legend of Lakshmi Prasad (2016). Simultaneously a screen version of his life was planned, in order to reach out to more audiences, saying "our world is filled with viewers, not readers." Khanna, who also serves as a co-producer on the film, said she was drawn to the project due to its relevant yet underrated subject about menstruation and Muruganantham's determination. She stated that the makers would be taking "creative liberties" with the subject as she had done in her book, to make it "entertaining".

R. Balki was Khanna's first choice to write and direct the film. She had previously seen Balki's work and appreciated his sensitivity in filmmaking.

In November 2017, Sony Pictures became the global distributor for the film.

=== Casting ===
Akshay Kumar plays Laxmikant Chauhan, based on Arunachalam Muruganantham, also known as "India's Menstrual Man". Kumar was not the first choice to play the role. Balki and Khanna wanted Kumar to play the lead and because they thought it would be a game-changing event if Kumar, who the Indian public idolises and men look up to, wore a sanitary pad.

=== Filming ===
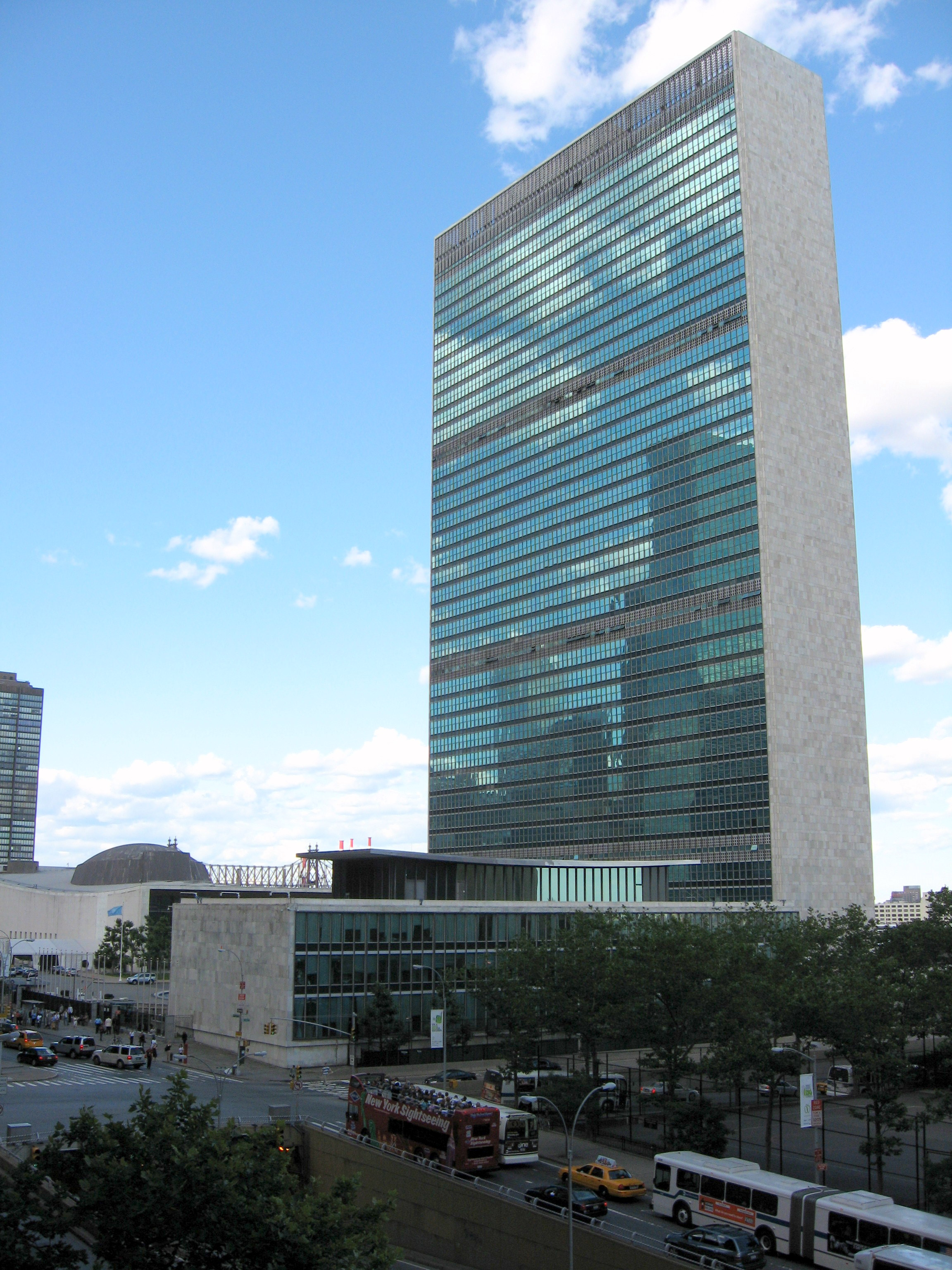
Pad Man is only the second Bollywood film to be granted access to shoot the film inside the headquarters of the United Nations in New York City, after Half Girlfriend in 2016.

Pre-production began in March 2017, and principal photography commenced on 14 March. Filming moved to Delhi in April. Muruganantham worked closely with R. Balki, Kumar and Khanna on set in India, making sure every detail was accurate from the way he built his machine, to how to operate it, even his own posture.

The majority of the film was shot in the small town of Maheshwar beside the Narmada River in Madhya Pradesh. After filming ended in India, the team travelled to New York City where pivotal scenes were filmed at the Brooklyn Bridge, in Times Square, and at Jazz at Lincoln Center, as well as at the United Nations headquarters. It is the second Bollywood film to be shot at the site following Half Girlfriend; the Hollywood film The Interpreter was the first film to ever be shot there.

== Soundtrack ==
The music of the film was composed by Amit Trivedi while the lyrics were written by Kausar Munir. The music of the film was officially released by Zee Music Company on 18 January 2018.

== Release ==
The film was initially planned to be released on 23 November 2017, but was later moved to 26 January. However, on 19 January, it was announced that the film has been postponed to 9 February 2018 to avoid clashing with Sanjay Leela Bhansali's Padmaavat. Regarding the possible box office clash with Aiyaary which was to release on the same day, Kumar denounced the tension saying that it was unlikely since both films have different subjects and themes.

Pad Man is scheduled to be released across 3350 screens worldwide; 2750 screens in India and 600 screens overseas. Being a social issue based film, the producer's are planning to show the film in various schools in smaller towns and cities with the aid of various ministries and the government.

In China, it released on 14 December 2018, with Chinese title "印度合伙人" (Yìndù héhuǒ rén), which translates as "Indian Partner". The film was released in Japan by Sony Pictures Entertainment Japan on 7 December 2018, with the title "パッドマン 5億人の女性を救った男" (Paddo man: 5 oku-ri no josei o sukutta otoko), which translates as "Padman: A man who saved 500 million women".

=== Marketing ===
The first trailer was released on 15 December 2017. Soon after, the trailer began trending on Twitter with the hashtag #PadManTrailer. Scenes showing Kumar casually trying to wear a sanitary napkin and handing them to his sister became a trending topic. A second poster was released on 25 December which shows Kumar holding cotton in his hand with words like "Fighter, Genius, Innovation, Unreal Man, No Shame, Real Problem and Passion" written all around. The Times of India called it a "unique poster".

=== Controversy ===
Padman was not screened in Kuwait and banned in Pakistan due to its subject revolving around a taboo. Central Board of Film Censors, Pakistan refused to give the No-Objection Certificate to the film and said, "we cannot allow a film whose name, subject and story are not acceptable yet in our society." They disallowed the Pakistani film distributors IMGC and HKC to purchase the film rights and stated that they were "ruining Islamic traditions, history and culture." Film posters were also removed from the local cinemas. Some Pakistani women have protested these decisions by sending pictures of them holding sanitary pads to the censor board.

== Reception ==
=== Box office ===
Market(s)	Gross revenue
India	₹1,049 million ($10.86 million)
Overseas	$15,617,101 (₹102.83 crore)
China	$10.1 million (₹669.1 million)
Japan	¥73,576,400 – ₹48 million ($496,961)
Other territories	$4.78 million (₹46.18 crore)
Worldwide	₹207.73 crore ($31.73 million)

Pad Man earned a modest ₹10.26 crore (US$1.1 million) on its opening day in India. Buoyed by good word of mouth, the film witnessed gradual momentum on its second and third day earning ₹16.11 crore (US$1.7 million) and ₹16.11 crore (US$1.7 million) respectively. In total, it earned ₹40.05 crore (US$4.2 million) nett (US$7.9 million gross) over its opening weekend.

Outside India, the film debuted simultaneously with its domestic debut in 5 international markets which generated around an estimated US$1 million for a worldwide opening of US$8.9 million.

In the United States and Canada, Pad Man grossed US$760,000 at an average of US$5,000 per screen from 152 screens. Sony noted that the film debuted above the opening of Kumar's Toilet: Ek Prem Katha, which debuted with US$678,000 from 176 theaters (US$3,852 per theater average).

In China, where Pad Man released on 14 December 2018, the film grossed $5.2 million in its opening weekend, entering the box office charts at number three, below Hollywood film Aquaman and Japanese anime film My Neighbour Totoro. As of 30 December 2018, Pad Man has grossed $10.1 million (₹669.1 million) in China.

Pad Man also entered Japan, not a traditional market for Indian films, where it grossed ₹48 million.

=== Critical reception ===
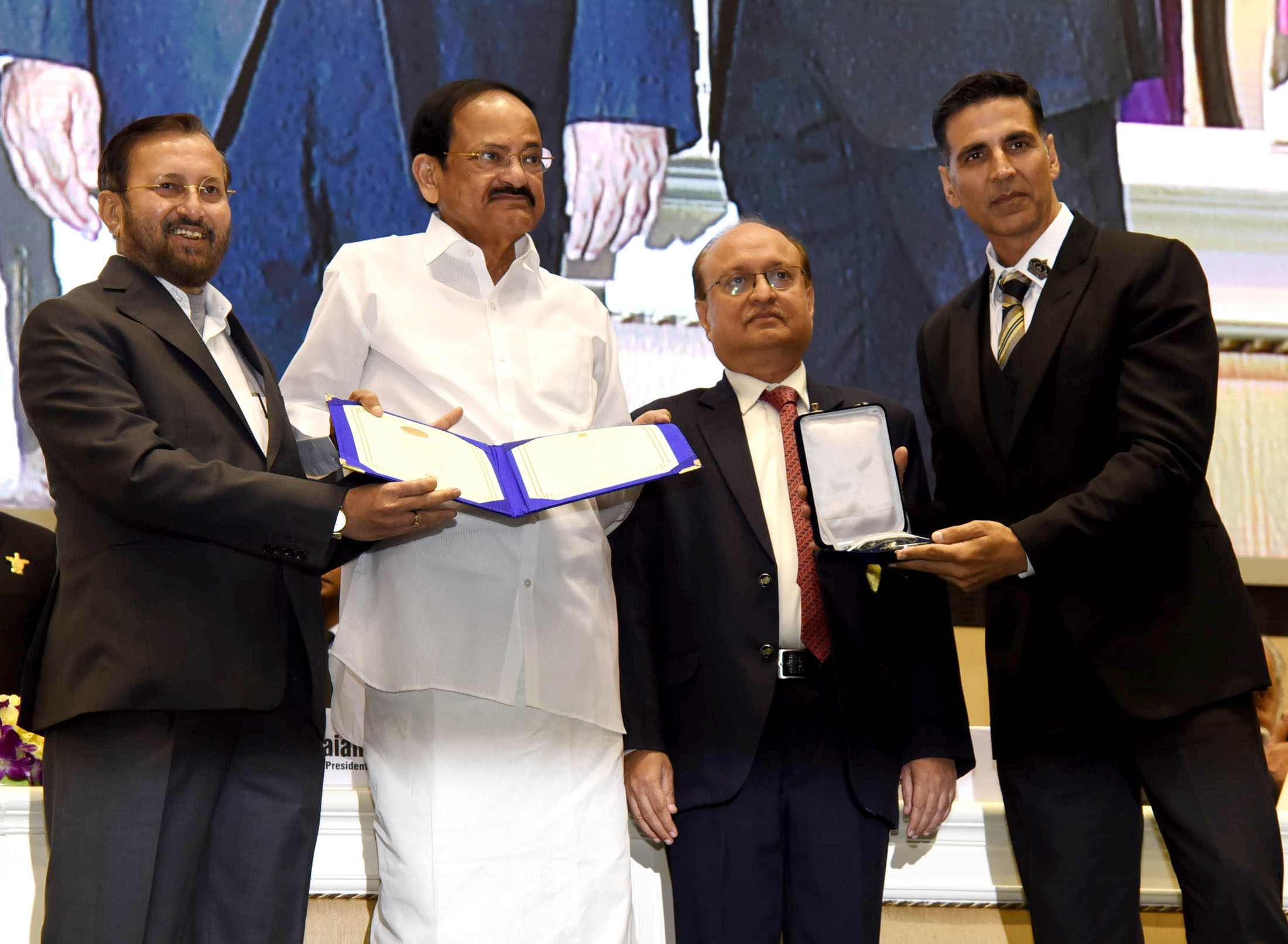
Kumar accepting on behalf of his wife and producer of the film, Twinkle Khanna the National Film Award for Best Film on Social Issues for the film at 66th National Film Awards

On review aggregator website Rotten Tomatoes, the film holds an approval rating of 74% based on 19 reviews, and an average rating of 6.1/10. Raja Sen of NDTV gave the film 4 out of 5 stars and said, "Pad Man, which features an extraordinary true-life story, is both a strong film and one that needs to be watched." Hindustan Times rated the film 3/5 stars, writing that "PadMan begins on [a] slow note and drags on for some time before picking up [the] pace. The characters in the supporting cast seem to be in a race for overacting". Anupama Chopra of Film Companion gave the film 2 out of 5 stars and said, "Until the mid-way point, Pad Man has snatches of power and emotion. Some scenes feel like a labored public service announcement and the melodrama gets shrill in places but largely Balki and his co-writer Swanand Kirkire keep the story moving. Humour is used cleverly." Rajeev Masand of News 18 gave the film 2.5 out of 5 stars and said, "The writing, by Balki and Swanand Kirkire, starts out sharp and funny, but quickly becomes heavy-handed and repetitive."

== Awards and nominations ==
Date of ceremony	Awards	Category	Recipient(s) and nominee(s)	Result	Ref.
23 March 2019	64th Filmfare Awards	Best Actor	Akshay Kumar	Nominated	
10 August 2018	Indian Film Festival of Melbourne	Best Film	Pad Man	Nominated	
10 August 2018	Indian Film Festival of Melbourne	Best Director	R. Balki	Won	
10 August 2018	Indian Film Festival of Melbourne	Best Actor	Akshay Kumar	Won	
2019	66th National Film Awards	Best Film on Other Social Issues	Pad Man	Won	

== See also ==
- Phullu (film)
- Period. End of Sentence. (Oscar-winning short film)
