= Jaan (film) =

1996 Indian film by Raj Kanwar

- Poster
- Directed by: Raj Kanwar
- Written by: Ranbir Pushp; Kamlesh Pandey (dialogues)
- Screenplay by: Ranbir Pushp
- Produced by: Ashok Ghai
- Starring: Ajay Devgn; Amrish Puri; Twinkle Khanna; Shakti Kapoor; Suresh Oberoi
- Cinematography: Harmeet Singh
- Edited by: Waman B.Bhosle
- Music by: Anand Milind
- Production company: Suneha Arts
- Distributed by: Mukta Arts
- Release dates: May 17, 1996 (Hindi); March 31, 1997 (USA)
- Country: India
- Language: Hindi
- Budget: ₹4.75 crore (US$490,000)
- Box office: ₹17.20 crore (US$1.8 million)

Jaan (transl. Life) is a 1996 Hindi-language action drama film directed by Raj Kanwar and produced by Ashok Ghai. The film stars Ajay Devgn, with Twinkle Khanna, Amrish Puri, Shakti Kapoor and Suresh Oberoi. It was theatrically released in United States on 31 March 1996 and India as well as other countries on 17 May 1996. The film's soundtrack was composed by Anand–Milind. Upon release, it was commercially successful, grossing ₹17.20 crore (US$1.8 million) worldwide. The film was declared a "super hit" at the box office.

== Plot ==
Police Commissioner Suryadev Singh (Amrish Puri) looks after his granddaughter Kajal (Twinkle Khanna) after her parents were poisoned by his enemies. Suryadev's cousin Vishambar (Suresh Oberoi) is plotting the complete ruin of Suryadev, along with wife and brother in-law Bhanwari (Shakti Kapoor), because Vishambar's late father had given his share of property, including a village Sundernagar, to Suryadev as Vishambar married someone against his wishes. Vishambar plans to kill Kajal to avenge himself as with Kajal gone, his son Nagendra can inherit the property. He hires Karan (Ajay Devgn) for this, a young man in need of money for treating his ailing mother in hospital. By rescuing Kajal in a fake kidnapping drama enacted by Vishambar's goons, he wins Suryadev's confidence. Suryadev then sends Kajal to some relatives in his village for a while, with Karan as her bodyguard, convinced that he will protect her.

Kajal falls in love with Karan, but he does not reciprocate. He hesitatingly tries to kill her on many occasions. Finally Karan decides to tell her everything, but Kajal refuses to listen and woos him till he finally gives in. Interspersed between is Damru (Johnny Lever) and his girlfriend with their hilarious acts. Vishambar learns that Karan has fallen for Kajal, and hires another killer, Dilavar to eliminate both of them. Kajal is kidnapped, but Karan rescues her and kills Dilavar.

Suryadev learns of Karan's original motive from a note written by Karan for Kajal, before he falls for her, left in his room, which she never reads. The lovers are finally apprehended. Karan is tortured, but does not reveal who hired him to kill Kajal, for fear that his mother would be affected.

Suryadev then arranges for Kajal to be married to Rohit, son of his longtime friend. Kajal agrees on the condition that Karan will be released from custody, to which Suryadev agrees. Karan learns about Kajal's wedding plans and leaves enraged, Karan's mother and Rohit are kidnapped by Bhanwari, and Karan is called to kill Rohit if he wants his mother back. Karan rescues Rohit and his mother, killing Bhanwari and his men. But Suryadev thinks Karan is behind kidnapping Rohit, and gives orders for him to be shot at sight.

Karan and Rohit arrive at the wedding scene, and Karan insists Rohit marry Kajal. A dying Bhanwari informs Vishambar about what Karan has done, and enraged, he fires a machine gun indiscriminately as Rohit is being married to Kajal, but Karan kills him. As the police take Karan away, Suryadev promises him a quick return from jail and marriage with Kajal.

== Cast ==
- Ajay Devgan as Karan Sharma
- Twinkle Khanna as Kajal Mehta
- Vivek Mushran as Rohit Kohli
- Amrish Puri as Commissioner Suryadev Singh
- Rakhi Gulzar as Rukmini
- Saeed Jaffery as Roshanlal
- Aruna Irani as Karan's mother
- Suresh Oberoi as Vishambar
- Shakti Kapoor as Bhanwari
- Johnny Lever as Damru
- Vishwajeet Pradhan as Nagendra
- Akash Khurana as Jagat Narayan
- Bindu (actress) as Rajrani
- Priya Arun as Dhanno
- Brahmachari as Bhairov Singh
- Khosrow Khaleghpanah as Hussain khan, as who fires Rocket launcher in Car to Kill Kajal.
- Hans Dev Sharma as Kajal's father
- Brownie Parasher as Jakarto

== Soundtrack ==
All music was composed by Anand–Milind. Lyrics were penned by Anand Bakshi.

#	Title	Singer(s)
1	"Jaan O Meri Jaan"	Manhar Udhas, Alka Yagnik
2	"Beiman Piya Re"	Udit Narayan, Alka Yagnik
3	"Kunwara Nahin Marna"	Alka Yagnik
4	"Rab Se Sajan Se"	Udit Narayan, Alka Yagnik
5	"Jaan Gayi Dil Aaya"	Udit Narayan, Alka Yagnik
6	"Hum Aise Karenge Pyar"	Udit Narayan, Sadhana Sargam
7	"Aai Bo Who Kaata"	Sapna Mukherjee, Alka Yagnik, Bhavna Pandit

== Reception ==
Rediff.com : "Despite a predictable plotline, [Kanwar] utilised Ajay Devgn's simmering intensity, Twinkle Khanna's sweet sophistication and Amrish Puri's towering persona to extract some engaging theatrics". Devgn and Khanna's pairing was repeated in Itihaas, which failed to do well commercially. The book Indian Traffic: Identities in Question in Colonial and Postcolonial India (1998) had a picture from a dance sequence in the film as its cover photo.
