= Arunachalam Muruganantham =

Indian social entrepreneur (born 1961)

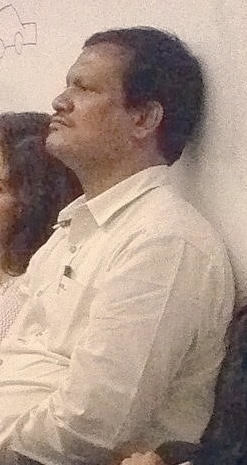
- Born: 12 October 1961 (age 65); Coimbatore, Tamil Nadu, India
- Other name: PadMan
- Citizenship: Indian
- Occupations: Inventor and Social entrepreneur
- Organization: Jayaashree Industries
- Known for: Invention of low-cost sanitary pad-making machine
- Spouse: Shanthi
- Awards: Padma Shri (2016)

Arunachalam Muruganantham (born 12 October 1961) also known as Padman is a social entrepreneur from Coimbatore in Tamil Nadu, India. He is the inventor of a low-cost sanitary pad-making machine and is credited for innovating grassroots mechanisms for generating awareness about traditional unhygienic practices around menstruation in rural India. His mini-machines, which can manufacture sanitary pads for less than a third of the cost of commercial pads, have been installed in 23 of the 28 states of India in rural areas. He is currently planning to expand the production of these machines to 106 nations. The movie Period. End of Sentence. won the Academy Award for Best Documentary (Short Subject) for the year 2018. The 2018 Hindi film Pad Man was made on his invention, where he was portrayed by Akshay Kumar.

In 2014, he was included in Time magazine's list of 100 Most Influential People in the World. In 2016, he was awarded the Padma Shri by the Government of India.

== Early life ==
Muruganantham was born in 1961 in a Tamil family. Muruganantham grew up in poverty after his father died in a road accident. His mother worked as a farm laborer to help in his studies. However, at the age of 14, he dropped out of school. He supplied food to factory workers and took up various jobs as a machine tool operator, yam-selling agent, farm laborer, and welder, to support his family.

== Invention ==
In 1998, he married Shanthi. Shortly after, Muruganantham discovered his wife collecting filthy rags and newspapers to use during her menstrual cycle, as sanitary napkins made by multinational corporations were expensive. Troubled by this, he started designing experimental pads. Initially, he made pads out of cotton, but these were rejected by his wife and sisters. Eventually, they stopped co-operating with him and refused to be the test subjects for his innovations. He realised that the raw materials cost ₹10 (10¢ US), but the end product sold for 40 times that price. He looked for female volunteers who could test his inventions, but most were too shy to discuss their menstrual issues with him. He started testing it himself, using a bladder with animal blood, but became the subject of ridicule when the "sanitary pad" was discovered in his village. As menstruation was a taboo subject in India, it left him ostracized by his community and family. He distributed his products free to girls in a local medical college, hoping that they would give him feedback.

It took him two years to discover that the commercial pads used cellulose fibers derived from pine bark wood pulp. The fibres helped the pads absorb while retaining shape. Imported machines that made the pads cost ₹35 million (US$360,000). He devised a low-cost machine that could be operated with minimal training. He sourced the processed pine wood pulp from a supplier in Mumbai, and the machines would grind, de-fibrate, press and sterilize the pads under ultraviolet light before packaging them for sale. The machine costs ₹65,000 (US$670).

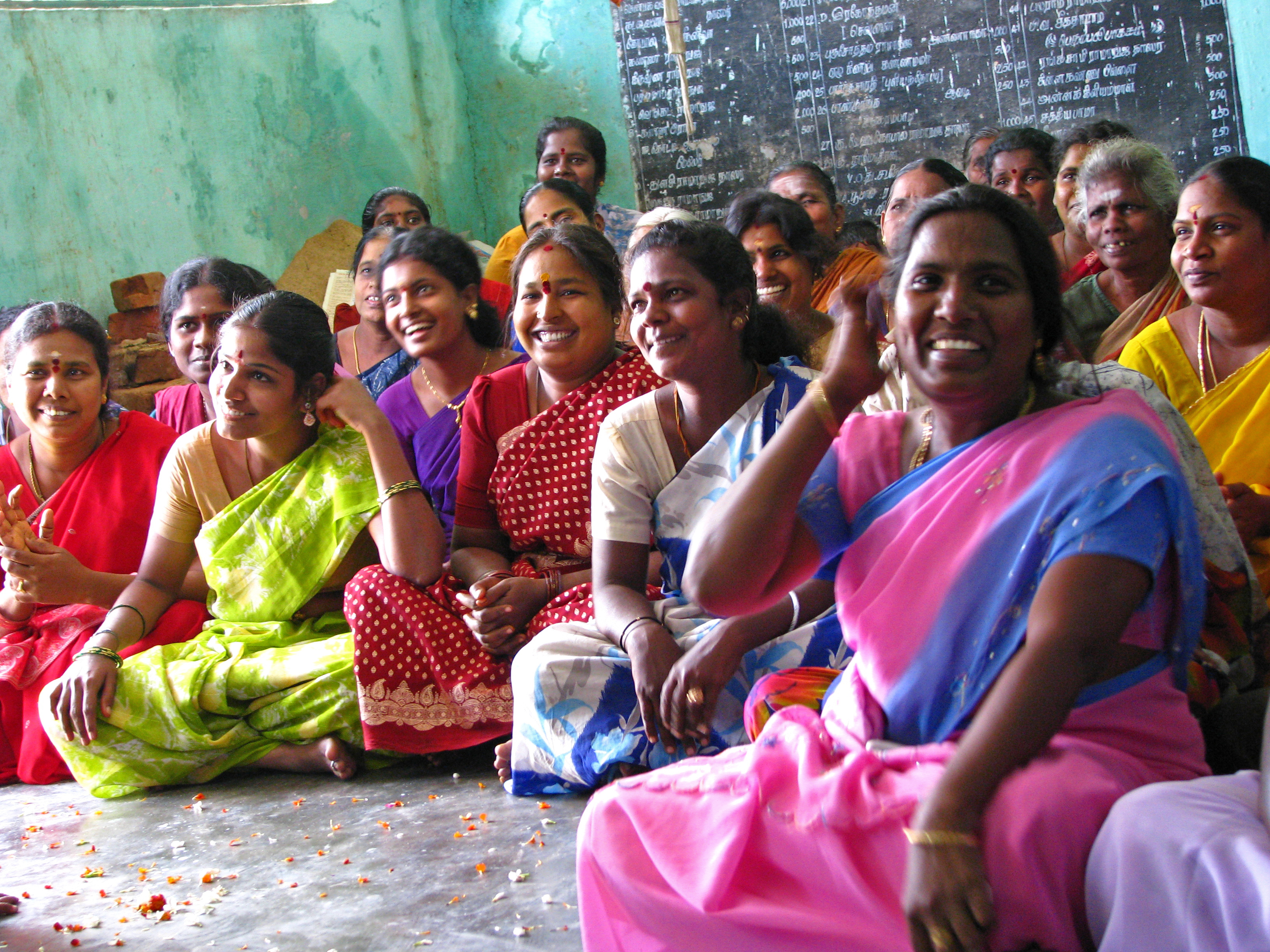
Rural women meeting as members of self-help groups

In 2006, he visited IIT Madras to show his idea and receive suggestions. They registered his invention for the National Innovation Foundation's Grassroots Technological Innovations Award; it won the award. He obtained seed funding and founded Jai Shree Industries, which now markets these machines to rural women across India. The machine has been praised for its simplicity and cost-effectiveness, and his commitment to social aid has earned him several awards. Despite offers from several corporate entities to commercialize his venture, he has refused, and continues to provide these machines to self-help groups run by women.

Muruganantham's invention is widely praised as a key step in changing women's lives in India. The machine creates jobs and income for many women, and affordable pads enable many more women to earn their livelihood during menstruation. In addition to his own outreach, Muruganantham's work has also inspired many other entrepreneurs to enter this area, including some who propose to use waste banana fibre or bamboo for the purpose.

== In popular culture ==
Muruganantham has become well known as a social entrepreneur. He has given lectures at many institutions including IIT Bombay, IIT Madras, IIM Ahmedabad, IIM Bangalore, Birla Institute of Technology and Science, Pilani – Goa Campus and Harvard University. He has also given a TED talk.

Muruganantham's story was the subject of a prize-winning documentary by Amit Virmani, Menstrual Man, and the film Phullu (2017) directed by Abhishek Saxena. Director R. Balki cast Indian actor Akshay Kumar as Laxmikant Chauhan in a film based on Muruganantham's life, titled Pad Man.

Movies:

Year	Title
2013	Menstrual Man
2017	Phullu
2018	Pad Man
2018	Period. End of Sentence.

== See also ==
- Women in India
- Maya Vishwakarma, also known as Padwoman
