= Twinkle Khanna =

Indian author and former actress (born 1973)

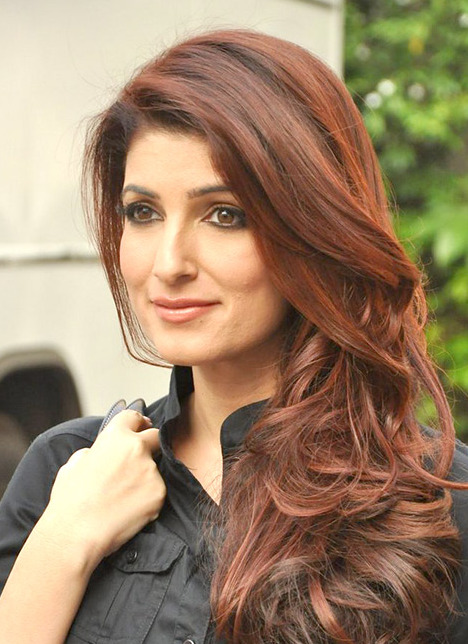
- Khanna in 2016
- Born: 29 December 1973 (age 52); Bombay, Maharashtra, India
- Education: NM College (BCom); Goldsmiths UoL (MA)
- Occupations: Author; former actress
- Years active: 1995–present
- Spouse: Akshay Kumar (m. 2001)
- Children: 2
- Parents: Rajesh Khanna (father); Dimple Kapadia (mother)
- Relatives: Rinke Khanna (sister)
- Family: Khanna family

Twinkle Khanna (born 29 December 1973) is an Indian actress, author, columnist. She has published the non-fiction collection Mrs Funnybones (2015), the short story collection The Legend of Lakshmi Prasad (2016), the novel Pyjamas Are Forgiving (2018), the short story collection Welcome to Paradise (2023) and Mrs Funnybones Returns (2025), a sequel to her first book.

The daughter of actors Dimple Kapadia and Rajesh Khanna, she made her acting debut in a leading role in Barsaat (1995), for which she received the Filmfare Award for Best Female Debut. After appearing as the leading lady in films including Jaan (1996), Jab Pyaar Kisise Hota Hai (1998), International Khiladi (1999), Baadshah (1999) and Love Ke Liye Kuch Bhi Karega (2001), she left the film industry.

Khanna subsequently worked as an interior designer and began writing newspaper opinion columns, later collected in her first book. In 2019 she founded Tweak India, a bilingual digital media platform aimed at women. She holds a master's degree in fiction writing from Goldsmiths, University of London.

In 2025 she co-hosted the Amazon Prime Video talk show Two Much with Kajol and Twinkle alongside the actress Kajol. Prime Video reported it as its most-watched unscripted Indian original series.

Khanna is married to the actor Akshay Kumar, with whom she has two children.

== Early life and education ==
Twinkle Khanna was born on 29 December 1973 in Bombay, Maharashtra, the first of two daughters of veteran Hindi film actors, Dimple Kapadia and Rajesh Khanna, with whom she shared her birthday. Her maternal grandfather, Chunnibhai Kapadia was a businessman. Her mother is a Gujarati and her father, Rajesh Khanna, a Punjabi from Amritsar, was from a family of railway contractors. On her mother's side, she is the niece of the actress and costume designer Simple Kapadia.. Khanna has said that she did not experience patriarchy while growing up alongside her sister, Rinke Khanna, who, like their cousin Karan Kapadia, has also acted in films.

.

Khanna attended the New Era High School in Panchgani and the Narsee Monjee College of Commerce and Economics of the University of Mumbai in Vile Parle. After finishing her Class 12th, she wanted to pursue a career as a chartered accountant and took the entrance examination, but joined the film industry instead due to the insistence of her parents.

She later pursued a Master of Arts from Goldsmiths, University of London in the New Cross area of Lewisham, graduating in 2024.

== Acting career (1995–2001) ==
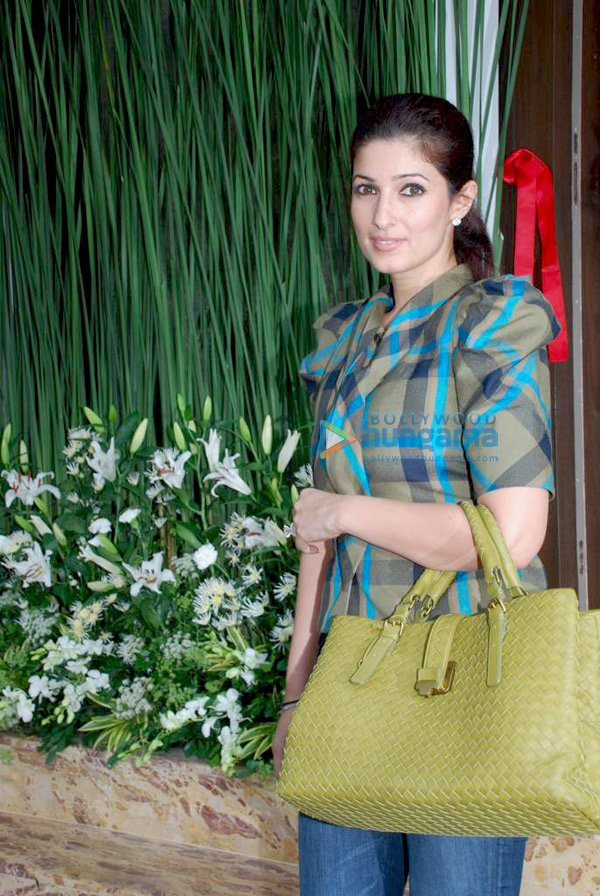
Khanna in 2010

Khanna made her screen debut opposite Bobby Deol in Rajkumar Santoshi's musical romance Barsaat (1995). She was cast by Dharmendra and before the film's release Khanna signed for two more projects. It performed well at the box office and became the sixth-highest-grossing film of the year, and she received the Filmfare Award for Best Female Debut for her performance. The following year she played lead roles in Raj Kanwar's action film Jaan and Lawrence D'Souza's romance Dil Tera Diwana opposite Ajay Devgn and Saif Ali Khan respectively. Jaan was a box office hit and Dil Tera Diwana did not perform well. K.N. Vijiyan of the New Straits Times wrote that "Khanna does not look like a typical Hindi actress". While reviewing Dil Tera Diwana, Vijiyan wrote about Khanna: "Unlike her previous movies, she looks really good in all her scenes and she can act well."

In 1997, two films featuring her; Uff! Yeh Mohabbat and Itihaas were released. Both of these films were poor box office performers. Her only release in 1998 was Jab Pyaar Kisise Hota Hai, which featured her as Salman Khan's love interest and was a box office success. Khanna acted opposite Akshay Kumar in two action films: International Khiladi and Zulmi (both 1999). In the former she played a news reporter who falls in love with a criminal whom she interviews. Both performed poorly at the box office. She was paired with Daggubati Venkatesh in the Telugu film Seenu (1999).

Khanna played the lead role in Baadshah (1999), featuring Shah Rukh Khan as a detective. In the same year, she acted opposite Saif Ali Khan in Yeh Hai Mumbai Meri Jaan, a romantic comedy directed by Mahesh Bhatt. She was paired opposite Aamir Khan in Dharmesh Darshan's Mela (2000). Similar to The Seven Samurai in story, it was an average grosser at the box office. Chal Mere Bhai (2000) featured Khanna in a special appearance beside a leading role in the comedy Joru Ka Ghulam, opposite Govinda. She also acted in the David Dhawan-directed comedy Jodi No.1 (2001). Her acting in the film met with poor reviews.

Film director Karan Johar admitted in an interview that Khanna was in his mind for the role of Tina in Kuch Kuch Hota Hai, but she refused it, and thus Rani Mukerji was signed. She left the industry after her marriage to Akshay Kumar in 2001, citing that she did not enjoy the acting profession any more. Her last film was Love Ke Liye Kuch Bhi Karega (2001), a remake of the Telugu movie Money (1993). It featured her opposite Fardeen Khan and was an average grosser at the box office.

== Off-screen work ==
In August and October 1999, Khanna performed in the Awesome Foursome concert held at the Shah Alam Outdoor Stadium, Malaysia and the Magnificent Five concert at Birmingham, England. Juhi Chawla, Shah Rukh Khan and Salman Khan accompanied her in the former while in the latter she performed alongside Aamir Khan, Aishwarya Rai, Akshaye Khanna and Rani Mukerji. The following year, she was part of the judge panel at Femina Miss India. She made her theatre debut as the female lead in Feroz Khan's All The Best in February 2001. In 2002, Khanna opened her own interior design store in Crawford Market, Mumbai, called The White Window, in partnership with her longtime friend Gurlein Manchanda. Since then, the store has received the Elle Decor International Design Award. She has opened up another branch of the store elsewhere in Mumbai. She does not hold a professional degree and worked with an architect for two years to learn the procedures. During her pregnancy, she practised maps and designs using CAD. Khanna did the interiors for Rani Mukerji's, Reemma Sen's and Tabu's houses, Kareena Kapoor's Bandra flat in 2008 and Poonam Bajaj's design studio. On the request of one of her clients, she ordered a company to make a golden toilet seat. In 2017, Khanna was signed as the Indian brand ambassador for L'Oréal Professionnel.

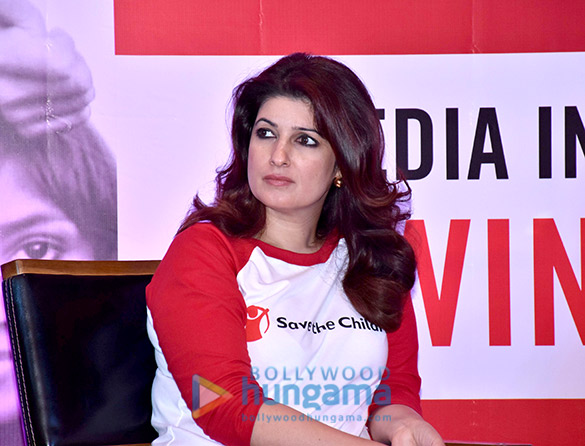
Khanna attends Save The Children event

Khanna has also endorsed for and designed Supertech's ORB project in Noida and another residential project in Pune. However, Khanna filed a case against Supertech for failing to pay ₹10.4 million (US$110,000) as endorsement fees. She also mentors International Institute of Fashion Designing's Academy of Interiors. Khanna is the co-founder of Grazing Goat Pictures and has co-produced the films Tees Maar Khan (2010) and Patiala House (2011). She also did a cameo appearance in the former film. Khanna has also co-produced Thank You (2011), Khiladi 786 (2012), and 72 Miles (2013). She has also been the brand ambassador for the watch brand Movado and endorsed Coca-Cola and Micromax Mobile. In December 2016, Khanna launched her production house, Mrs. Funnybones Movies, which eventually co-produced Pad Man. The film went on to win the 2018 National Film Award for Best Film on Other Social Issues.

Khanna has written weekly opinion columns for DNA After Hours, the weekend supplement of Daily News and Analysis, and for The Times of India. The columns, written under the byline Mrs Funnybones, formed the basis of her first book. In 2015, Penguin Random House announced that Mrs Funnybones had entered the Nielsen bestseller list at number two in its first week of sales. Launched in Mumbai on 18 August 2015, the book reached number one on the bestseller chart of Crossword's Kemps Corner store. According to Nielsen BookScan India, it made Khanna the highest-selling female author in India that year. Khanna's second book The Legend of Lakshmi Prasad, a collection of four short stories, launched in November 2016 sold more than 100,000 copies. Her third book, the novel Pyjamas Are Forgiving, was published by Juggernaut Books in September 2018. According to Nielsen BookScan India it debuted at number one on the all-India bestseller list, and the publisher reported sales of more than 100,000 copies.

Khanna has been active in advocating the cause of menstrual hygiene. She joined hands with Save the Children to promote the right to menstrual hygiene among children and slum communities. She was invited to speak at the University of Oxford in 2018. She was also invited to be a part of an eminent panel at the United Nations, New York and also appeared on BBC world Impact show to talk about menstrual hygiene and sanitation globally.

In 2019, Khanna founded Tweak India, a bilingual digital media platform for women covering subjects including parenting, body image, mental health, LGBTQI issues, wellness and sustainability.

In 2022, Khanna went onto pursue her master's in fiction writing at Goldsmiths, University of London. She received a distinction for her final dissertation, and was one of the shortlistees for the Pat Kavanagh Prize.

== Personal life ==
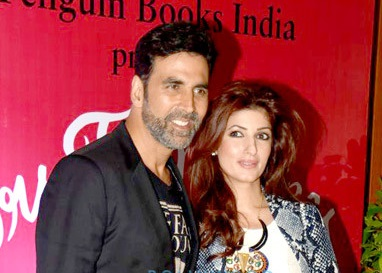
Khanna with her husband, Akshay Kumar, pictured 2015

In 2001, Khanna campaigned for her father's election in New Delhi. She met Akshay Kumar, for the first time during a photo session for Filmfare magazine. They got married on 17 January 2001 and together have a son, Aarav and a daughter, Nitara. Kumar often credits Khanna for his success. In 2009, People magazine listed her as the fourth-best-dressed celebrity in India.

In 2014, Khanna and her sister sold their father's house for ₹85 crores.

== Filmography ==
=== As actress ===
Year	Title	Role	Notes	Ref
1995	Barsaat	Tina Oberoi		
1996	Jaan	Kajal		
1996	Dil Tera Diwana	Komal		
1997	Uff! Yeh Mohabbat	Sonia Verma		
1997	Itihaas	Naina		
1998	Jab Pyaar Kisise Hota Hai	Komal Sinha		
1999	International Khiladi	Payal		
1999	Zulmi	Komal Dutt		
1999	Seenu	Swetha	Telugu-language film	
1999	Baadshah	Seema Malhotra		
1999	Yeh Hai Mumbai Meri Jaan	Jasmine Arora		
2000	Mela	Roopa Singh		
2000	Chal Mere Bhai	Pooja	Special appearance	
2000	Joru Ka Ghulam	Durga		
2001	Jodi No.1	Tina		
2001	Love Ke Liye Kuch Bhi Karega	Anjali		
2010	Tees Maar Khan	Herself	Guest appearance	

=== As producer ===
Year	Title	Notes	Ref
2010	Tees Maar Khan		
2010	Khatta Meetha		
2011	Thank You		
2011	Patiala House		
2012	Khiladi 786		
2013	72 Miles	Marathi language film	
2018	Pad Man		

=== Television ===
Kajol in TV Series
Year	Title	Role	Language	Ref.
2025	Two Much with Kajol and Twinkle	Host	Hindi	

== Accolades ==
Year	Award	For	Notes	Ref
1996	Filmfare Award for Best Female Debut	Barsaat		
2010	Hello! Hall of Fame Award for Most Stylish Couple of the Year	—	Along with Akshay Kumar	
2016	Outlook Social Media Award	Inspiring Woman of the Year		
2016	Crossword Popular Non-Fiction Award	Mrs Funnybones		
2017	Hello! Hall of Fame Award for Visionary Woman of the Year	—		
2017	India Today Woman Writer of the Year	The Legend of Lakshmi Prasad		
2017	Vogue Opinion Maker of the Year	—		
2017	Bangalore Literature Festival—Popular Choice Award	The Legend of Lakshmi Prasad		
2019	National Film Award for Best Film on Social Issues	Pad Man	Akshay Kumar, who is the starrer of the film accepted on her behalf	
2019	Crossword Book Award (Popular) For Fiction	Pyjamas Are Forgiving		
2024	Crossword Book Award (Popular) For Fiction	Welcome To Paradise		

== Bibliography ==
- Khanna, Twinkle (18 August 2015). Mrs Funnybones: She's just like You and a lot like Me. Gurgaon: Penguin India. ISBN 978-93-5214-128-9. OCLC 984513921.
- Khanna, Twinkle (7 November 2016). The Legend of Lakshmi Prasad. New Delhi: Juggernaut Books. ISBN 978-93-86228-05-5. OCLC 967492069.
- Khanna, Twinkle (7 September 2018). Pyjamas Are Forgiving. Juggernaut Books. ISBN 978-93-8-62-2897-0.
